= 1998 Winter Olympics =

Multi-sport event in Nagano, Japan

XVIII Olympic Winter Games
- Emblem of the 1998 Winter Olympics (Note: The emblem represents a flower, with each petal representing an athlete practicing a different winter sport. It can also be seen as a snowflake, thus the name "Snowflower" was given to it.)
- Location: Nagano, Japan
- Motto: Coexistence with Nature (Japanese: 自然との共存, Shizen to no Kyōzon)
- Nations: 72
- Athletes: 2,180 (1,393 men, 787 women)
- Events: 68 in 7 sports (14 disciplines)
- Opening: 7 February 1998
- Closing: 22 February 1998
- Opened by: Emperor Akihito
- Closed by: IOC president Juan Antonio Samaranch
- Cauldron: Midori Ito
- Stadium: Nagano Olympic Stadium

Map of the 1998 Nagano Olympics locations

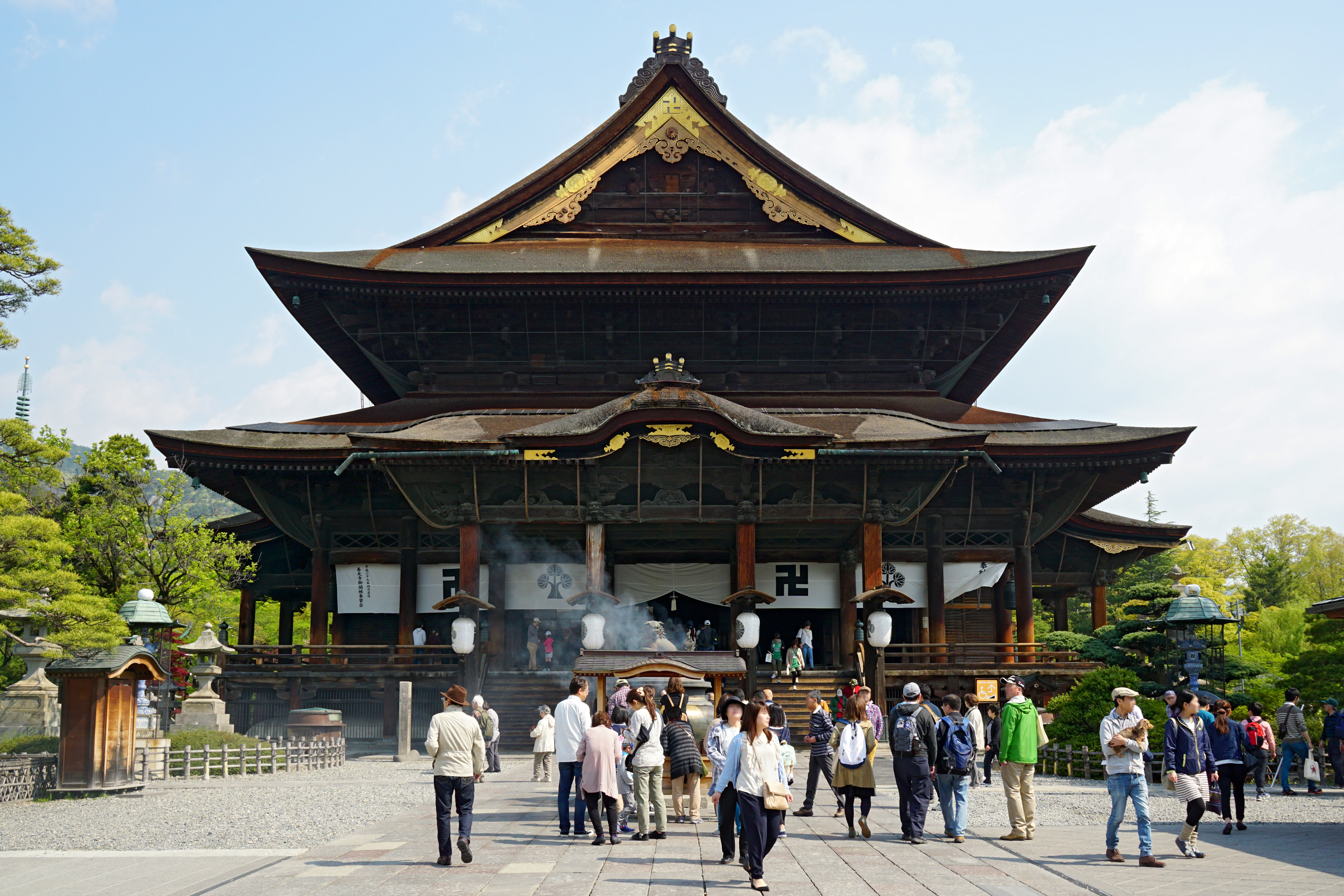
Main hall of Zenkō-ji in Nagano City.

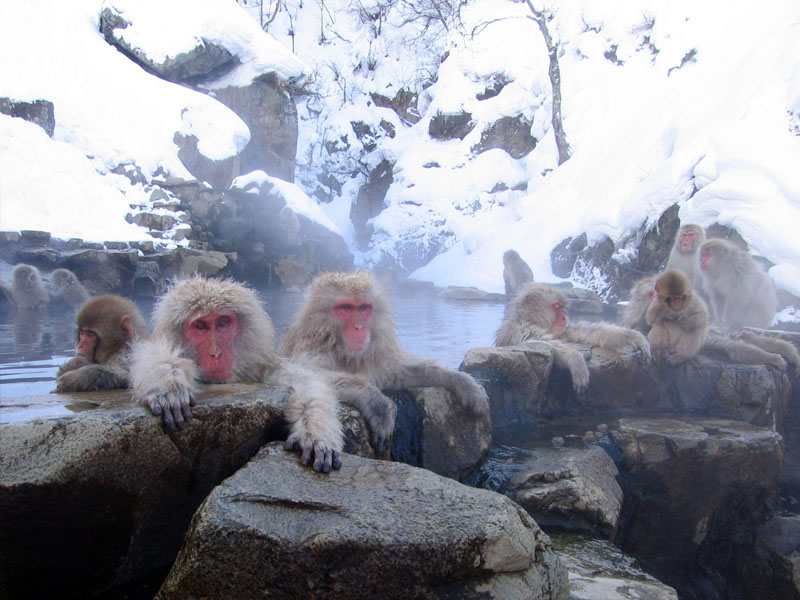
Japanese macaque at Jigokudani hotspring in Yamanouchi.

The 1998 Winter Olympics, officially known as the XVIII Olympic Winter Games (Japanese: 第18回オリンピック冬季競技大会, Hepburn: Dai Jūhachi-kai Orinpikku Tōkikyōgi Taikai) and commonly known as Nagano 1998 (Japanese: 長野1998), were a winter multi-sport event held from 7 to 22 February 1998, mainly in Nagano Prefecture, Japan, with some events taking place in the nearby mountain communities of Hakuba, Karuizawa, Nozawa Onsen, and Yamanouchi. The city of Nagano had previously been a candidate to host the 1940 Winter Olympics (which were later cancelled), as well as the 1972 Winter Olympics, but had been eliminated at the national level by Sapporo on both occasions.

The games hosted 2,176 athletes from 72 nations competing in 7 sports and 68 events. The number of athletes and participating nations were a record at the time. The Games saw the introduction of women's ice hockey, curling and snowboarding. National Hockey League players were allowed to participate in the men's ice hockey for the first time. Azerbaijan, Kenya, Macedonia, Uruguay, and Venezuela made their debut at the Winter Olympics.

The athlete who won the most medals at these games was the Russian cross-country skier Larisa Lazutina who won five medals, including three gold. The Norwegian cross-country skier Bjørn Dæhlie won four medals, including three gold, which took his total Olympic medal total to 12, including eight gold, which is a record for Winter Olympics. Czech men's ice hockey team won the gold medal. In Ski Jumping, Kazuyoshi Funaki won two gold medals and one silver for host Japan. The American Figure skater Tara Lipinski became the youngest champion in Olympic history at the age of 15 years and 255 days. Germany dominated the medal table with 29 medals, including 12 gold. Germany was followed by Norway and Russia, who won 25 and 18 medals respectively. Canada, which finished fourth in the medal table with 15 medals, including six gold, had its most successful Winter Olympics up until that point.

The host was selected on 15 June 1991, over Salt Lake City, Östersund, Jaca and Aosta. They were the third Olympic Games and second Winter Olympics to be held in Japan, after the 1964 Summer Olympics in Tokyo and the 1972 Winter Olympics in Sapporo. The games were succeeded by the 1998 Winter Paralympics from 5 to 14 March. These were the final Winter Olympic Games under the IOC Presidency of Juan Antonio Samaranch.

The hosting of the games improved transportation networks with the construction of the high-speed Shinkansen, the Nagano Shinkansen (now the Hokuriku Shinkansen), between Tokyo and Nagano Station, via Ōmiya and Takasaki. In addition, new highways were built, including the Nagano Expressway and the Jōshin-etsu Expressway and upgrades were made to existing roads.

== Host city selection ==
In 1932, Japan won the rights to host the 1940 Summer Olympics in Tokyo. At that time, organizers of the Summer Olympics had priority in choosing the venue for the Winter Olympics the same year. Several Japanese cities, including Nagano, prepared a bid. Sapporo was chosen; however, the games never took place because of World War II. In 1961, Nagano declared its intention to host the 1968 Winter Olympics but lost to Sapporo, the winning Japanese bid, who lost to Grenoble, France, and Sapporo eventually won the right to host the 1972 Winter Olympics.

Japanese private sector organizations, in 1983, began publicly discussing a possible bid. Two years later, in 1985, the Nagano Prefectural Assembly, decided to begin the process to bid, for its third time, for a Winter Olympics. The bid committee was established in July 1986, they submitted their bid to the Japanese Olympic Committee (JOC) in November of the same year. Other Japanese cities that were bidding were Asahikawa, Yamagata, and Morioka. 1 June 1988, the JOC selected Nagano in the first round of national voting, receiving 34 of 45 votes. In 1989, the bid committee was reorganized, with the Japanese Prime Minister as head of the committee. The number of committee members was 511.

On 12 February 1990, the bid delegation presented its candidature at the International Olympic Committee in Lausanne before Juan Antonio Samaranch. Other candidate cities for the 1998 Olympics were Aosta, Italy; Jaca, Spain; Östersund, Sweden; Salt Lake City, United States, and Sochi, Russian SFSR, Soviet Union (now Russia). The host city selection was held in Birmingham, United Kingdom, on 15 June 1991, at the 97th IOC session. After the first round of voting, Nagano led, with Aosta and Salt Lake City tied for last. Aosta was eliminated in a run-off against Salt Lake City. After the second round of voting, Nagano led with Salt Lake City in second, and Jaca was eliminated. Following round 3, Nagano continued to lead, with Salt Lake City in second, and Östersund was eliminated. Finally, Nagano prevailed over Salt Lake City by just 4 votes in the fifth round of voting, becoming the third Japanese city to host the games after Tokyo in 1964 Summer Olympics and Sapporo in 1972. Nagano, at 36°N, is the southernmost city in the Northern Hemisphere to host the Winter Olympics (1960 Winter Olympics host Squaw Valley, California is 39°N). In June 1995, Salt Lake was chosen as the host of the following 2002 Winter Olympics.

Following a 2002 Winter Olympic bid scandal that occurred in the summer of 2000, Atlanta, host of the 1996 Summer Olympics, Nagano, and Sydney, host of the 2000 Summer Olympics, were suspected of similar improprieties in bidding practices. Although nothing illegal was ever done, gifts to IOC members were considered morally dubious. The Nagano Olympic bid committee spent approximately $14 million to entertain the 62 International Olympic Committee members and many of their companions. The precise figures are unknown since Nagano, after the IOC asked that the entertainment expenditures not be made public, destroyed the financial records, according to bid member Junichi Yamaguchi.

1998 Winter Olympics bidding results
City	Country	Round				
City	Country	1	Run-Off	2	3	4
Nagano	Japan	21	—	30	36	46
Salt Lake City	United States	15	59	27	29	42
Östersund	Sweden	18	—	25	23	—
Jaca	Spain	19	—	5	—	—
Aosta	Italy	15	29	—	—	—

== Organization ==
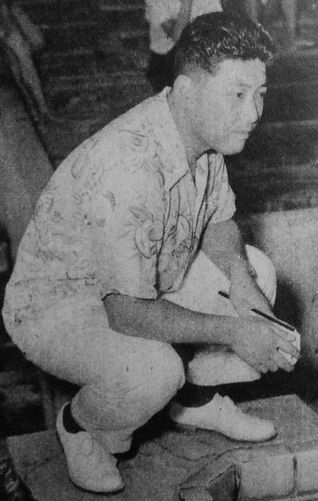
Furuhashi Hironoshin, past president of the JOC

Five months after the city was selected, the Nagano Olympic Organizing Committee (NAOC) was created. Eishiro Saito, Chairman of Japan Business Federation (Keidanren) was selected as president of the committee. There were four Vice Presidents: Goro Yoshimura, the Governor of Nagano Prefecture; Hironoshin Furuhashi, president of the Japanese Olympic Committee; Yoshiaki Tsutsumi, the president of the Ski Association of Japan; and Tasuku Tsukada, the Mayor of Nagano City. In addition, the Vice Minister of the Ministry of Home Affairs, Tadashi Tsuda, served as director-general. Tsuda was replaced by Makoto Kobayashi in 1993.

The organizing committee recognized three goals for the games, which they referred to as "Games from the Heart": promote youth participation, coexistence with nature, create a festival with peace and friendship at its centre. To realize the first goal, a camp bringing together 217 young people from 51 countries was created, along with the program of "One school, one country" in Nagano Prefecture. This program organized cultural exchanges with other countries. In addition, more than 100,000 tickets were reserved for children. For the second point, the organizers attempted to minimize the impact on their nature and the local ecosystem. Regarding the third point, an international truce organized by the United Nations in 1997 was adopted during the games.

The Nagano Olympics Games are a link to the 21st century, inspiring our search for wisdom for the new ear, respect for the beauty and bounty of nature, furtherance of peace and goodwill. Friends worldwide are welcome to share, in the spirit of competition and fair play, the joys and glory of the XVIII Olympic Winter Games.

In June 1998, four months after the Games, the NAOC presented a donation of US$1 million to the Olympic Museum in Lausanne. This value come of the revenue of tickets sales and another actions from the committee. In October of the same year, NAOC also donated the 3-D high vision theater and some structures that were used in Nagano Olympic Villages to the Olympic Museum.

In February 1999, one year after the Games, the IOC awarded the Nagano the Olympic Cup, and presented the city a replica of the sculpture of stylized athletes raising the Olympic Flag by the Swiss artist Nag Arnoldi. (Note: Hanazawa 1999b, p. 341)

=== Economic aspects ===
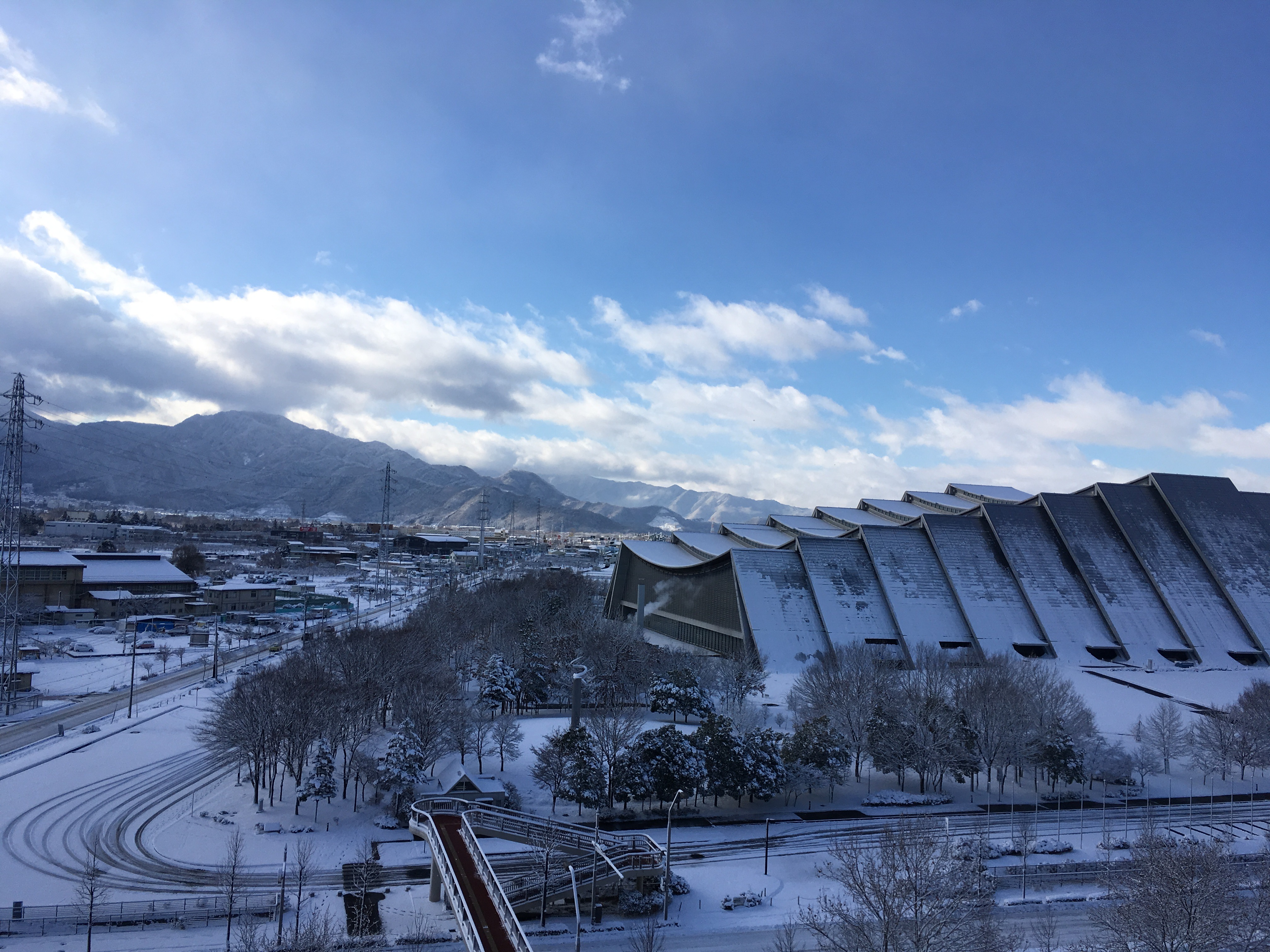
M-Wave

The costs of construction and of the land of the Olympic venues totaled ¥106.6 billion, (Note: Hanazawa 1999a, p. 185) approximately 914 million US dollars. Of this, the Japanese national government spent ¥51.1 billion, the Nagano prefectural government spent ¥29.6 billion, and the cities and towns of Nagano, ¥23.4 billion; Hakuba, ¥1 billion; and Nozawa Onsen, ¥1.1 billion; shared the remaining ¥25.5 billion. (Note: Hanazawa 1999a, p. 185) The most expensive venue was the impressive M-Wave, the indoor rink which hosted the long-track speed skating events. It cost near ¥34.8 billion. (Note: Hanazawa 1999a, p. 185) The two ice hockey venues, Big Hat and Aqua Wing Arena cost ¥19.1 and ¥9.1 billion respectively. (Note: Hanazawa 1999a, p. 185) The White Ring (arena), which hosted figure skating and short-track speed skating cost ¥14.2 billion, the Spiral, which hosted bobsleigh, luge, and skeleton, cost ¥10.1 billion. (Note: Hanazawa 1999a, p. 185) Another ¥8.6 billion was spent on the Hakuba Ski Jumping Stadium, ¥7 billion for Snow Harp – the cross-country skiing venue, and ¥3 billion for the biathlon venue at Nozawa Onsen Snow Resort. (Note: Hanazawa 1999a, p. 185)

The organizing committee financed all costs, totaling ¥113.9 billion. It spent ¥99.4 billion for operational expenses, ¥21.6 billion for public relations, ¥20.7 billion for installations, ¥18.4 billion for telecommunications, ¥15.9 billion for running the competitions, and ¥14.4 billion for administration. Television rights were worth ¥35.4 billion, and marketing earned ¥31.3 billion. Ticket sales were worth ¥10.5 billion. The total cost of the Nagano Games is estimated to have been US$15.25 billion (in 2015), of which the largest factor in the cost of the games was the extension of the shinkansen to Nagano. This compares, for example, with US$2.5 billion for the 2002 Winter Olympics, US$4.35 billion for the 2006 Winter Olympics, US$7.56 billion for the 2010 Winter Olympics, and US$51 billion for the 2014 Winter Olympics

=== Transportation ===
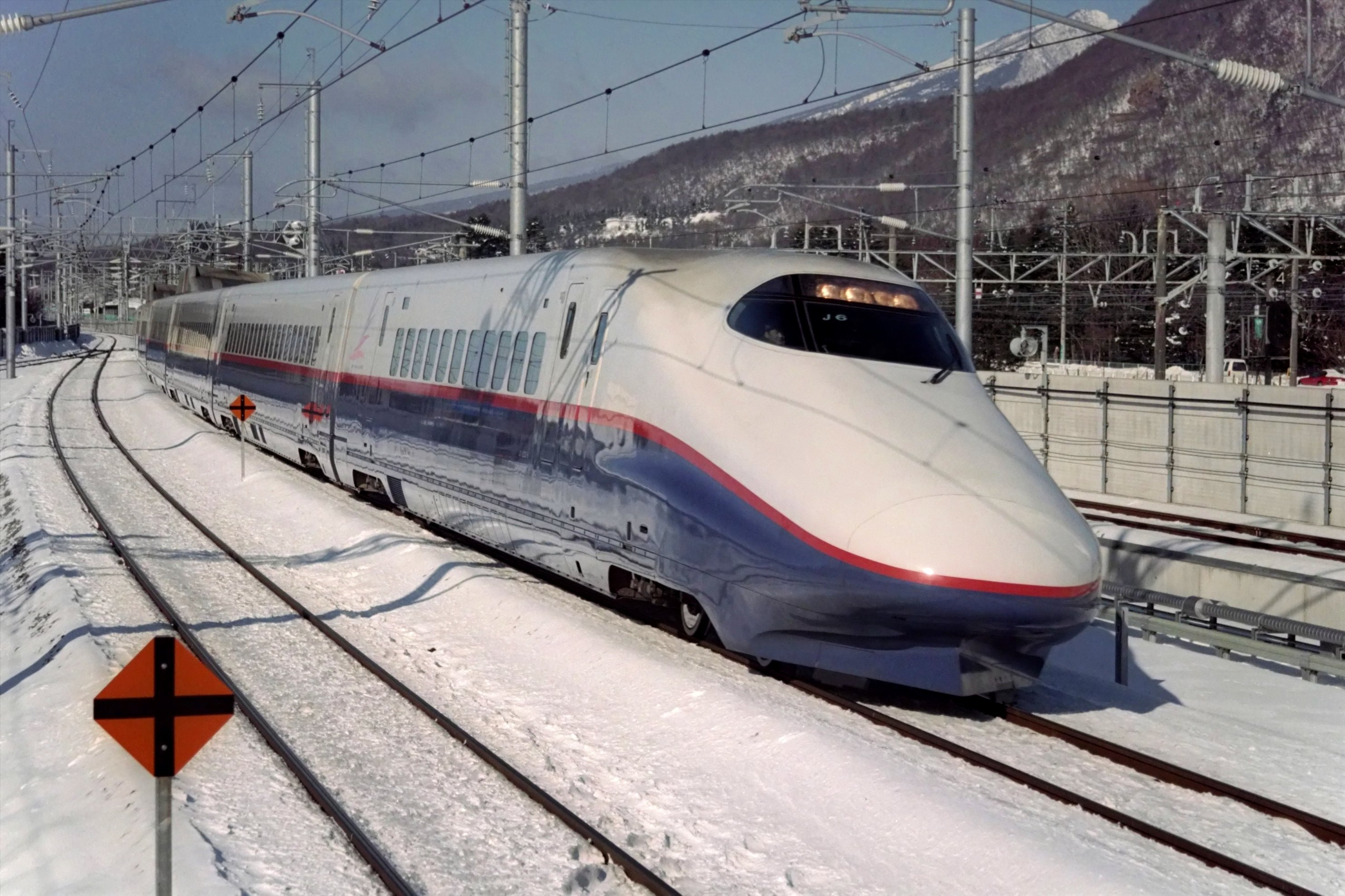
A Nagano Shinkansen E2 Series "J" set in February 1998

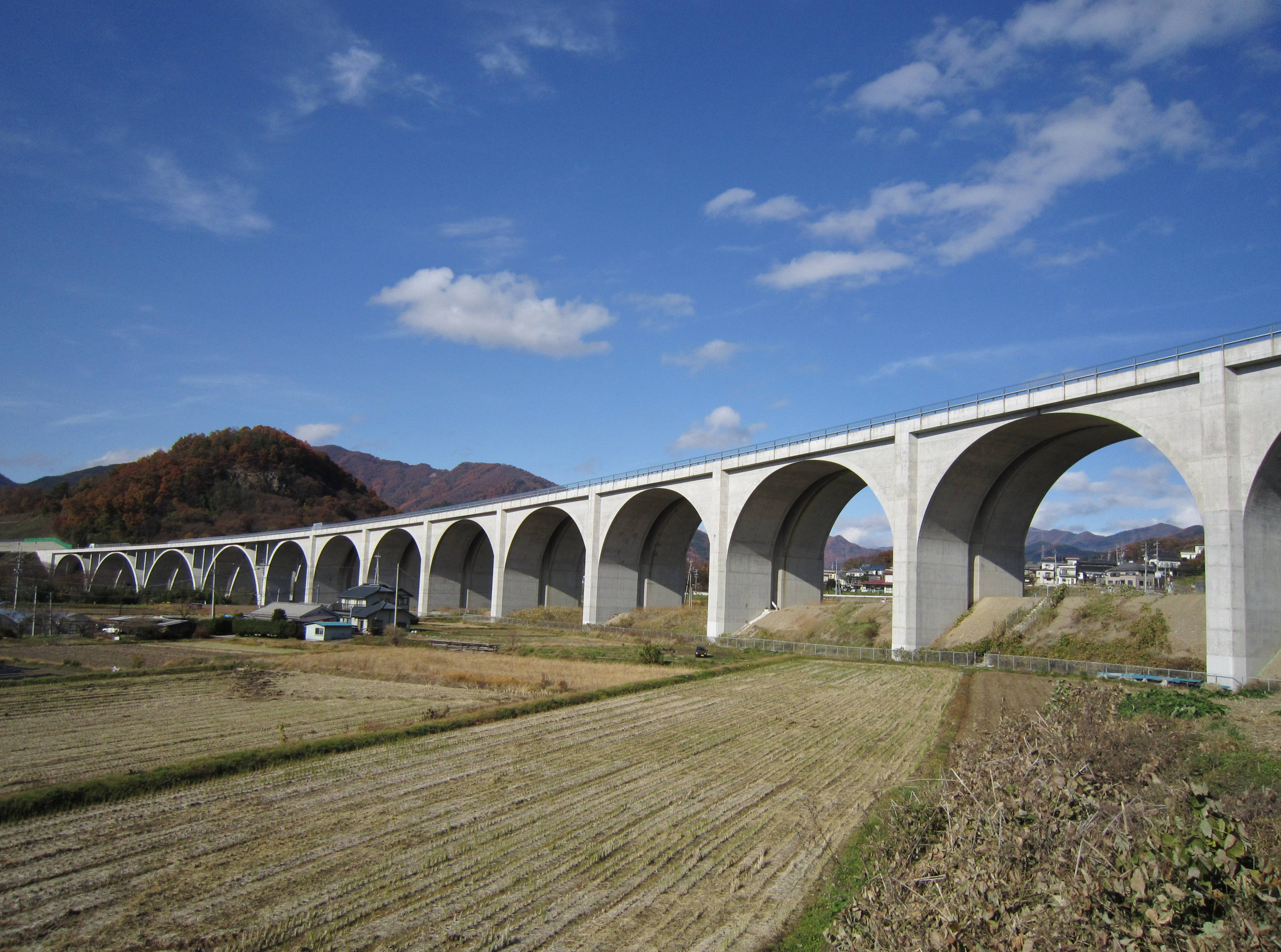
Jōshin-etsu Expressway in Ueda, Nagano.

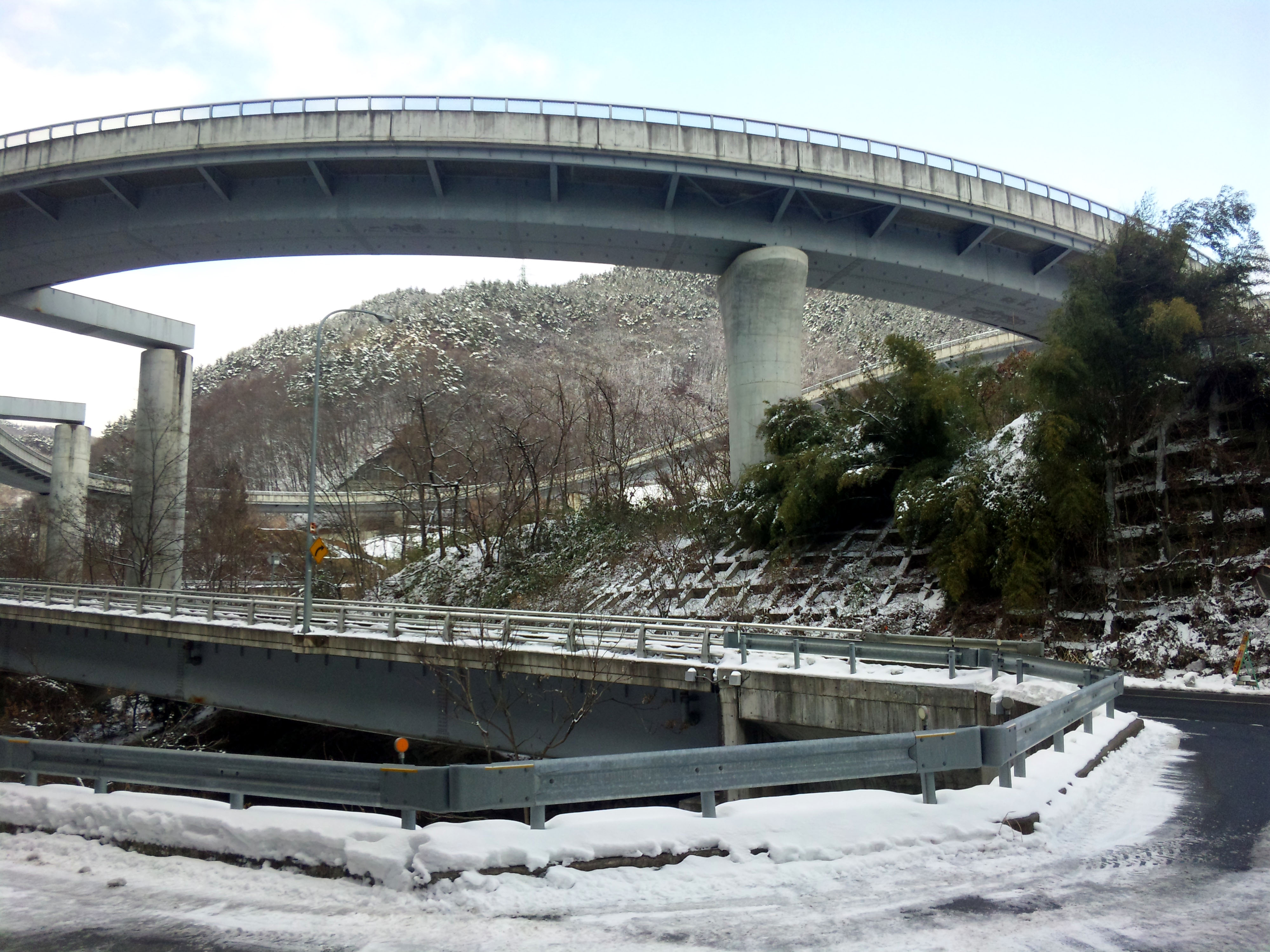
Asagawa Loop Line to Iizuna Kogen Ski Area built in preparations for the Games

Nagano is situated at the Japanese Alps area and receives large snowfalls every year. These combined to make transportation an important challenge for the organizing committee. In addition, the Olympic Village was a distance of 7 kilometers from the center of the city, and sporting events were spread over five surrounding cities. The complicating matters were that many of the venues had one single road in-out, which limited possibilities and led to traffic jams. (Note: Hanazawa 1999a, p. 234)

To improve access to Nagano, the government decided to link the prefecture with the high-speed shinkansen train network. Called Nagano Shinkansen (now the Hokuriku Shinkansen), it was inaugurated five months before the start of the Games. This reduced by half the travel time between Tokyo and Nagano, to 79 minutes for 221 kilometers. (Note: Hanazawa 1999a, p. 240) The length of the track between Takasaki Station and Nagano Station is 125.7 km, which includes 63.4 km of tunnels. The high speed train network carried 655,000 passengers during the Games. (Note: Hanazawa 1999b, p. 309)

Two highways, the Nagano Expressway and the Jōshin-etsu Expressway, were also built in the Nagano region. (Note: Hanazawa 1999b, p. 301) In May 1993, the 75.8-kilometer section of the Nagano Expressway was completed, and in October 1997, the 111.4 kilometer section of the Jōshin-etsu Expressway was completed. (Note: Hanazawa 1999b, p. 309) In addition, another 114.9 kilometers of roads within Nagano Prefecture were improved.

Transportation systems for the Games ran for 33 days, from the opening of the Athletes Village until 3 days after the Paralympics closing ceremony, when the Village was decommissioned from its functions. Approximately 64% of the athletes arrived between 1 and 6 February, and 74% left Nagano between 22 and 25 February. (Note: Hanazawa 1999a, p. 237) Logistical operations were directed from the operational centre situated at the Organizing Committee headquarters. Two regional logistical minor hubs were created in Hakuba and Yamanouchi, as well as a traffic center for buses and cars in Karuizawa. (Note: Hanazawa 1999a, p. 235) The organizers’ expectations were that the logistics for the arrival of the delegations would be handled entirely at Narita International Airport, which ultimately did not happen due to the massive demand for air tickets—a situation that drove up prices and forced some delegations to arrive in Japan via alternative airports, such as Kansai International Airport and Chubu Centrair International Airport in Nagoya (Note: Hanazawa 1999a, p. 238) The members of the IOC and the delegations who arrived in Narita traveled to Nagano via Shinkansen. (Note: Hanazawa 1999a, p. 236)To meet this demand, transport services were expanded, with an increase in the number of trains in operation as well as an extension of their operating hours. (Note: Hanazawa 1999a, p. 236) During peak traffic days, more cars and buses were put into service. In total, 31,000 parking spaces were provided: 25.8% (8,000 spaces) for Olympic delegations and 74.2% (23,000 spaces) for spectators. Additionally, about 1,200 vehicles—equivalent to 15% of the delegations' capacity—were equipped with GPS tracking. (Note: Hanazawa 1999a, p. 248)

As one of the principal aims of the Games was to respect nature, many vehicles were considered ecological or semi-ecological. In addition, there were more than 100 electric vehicles, hybrid mini-buses and other environmentally-friendly vehicles. (Note: Hanazawa 1999a, p. 247)

=== Marketing ===
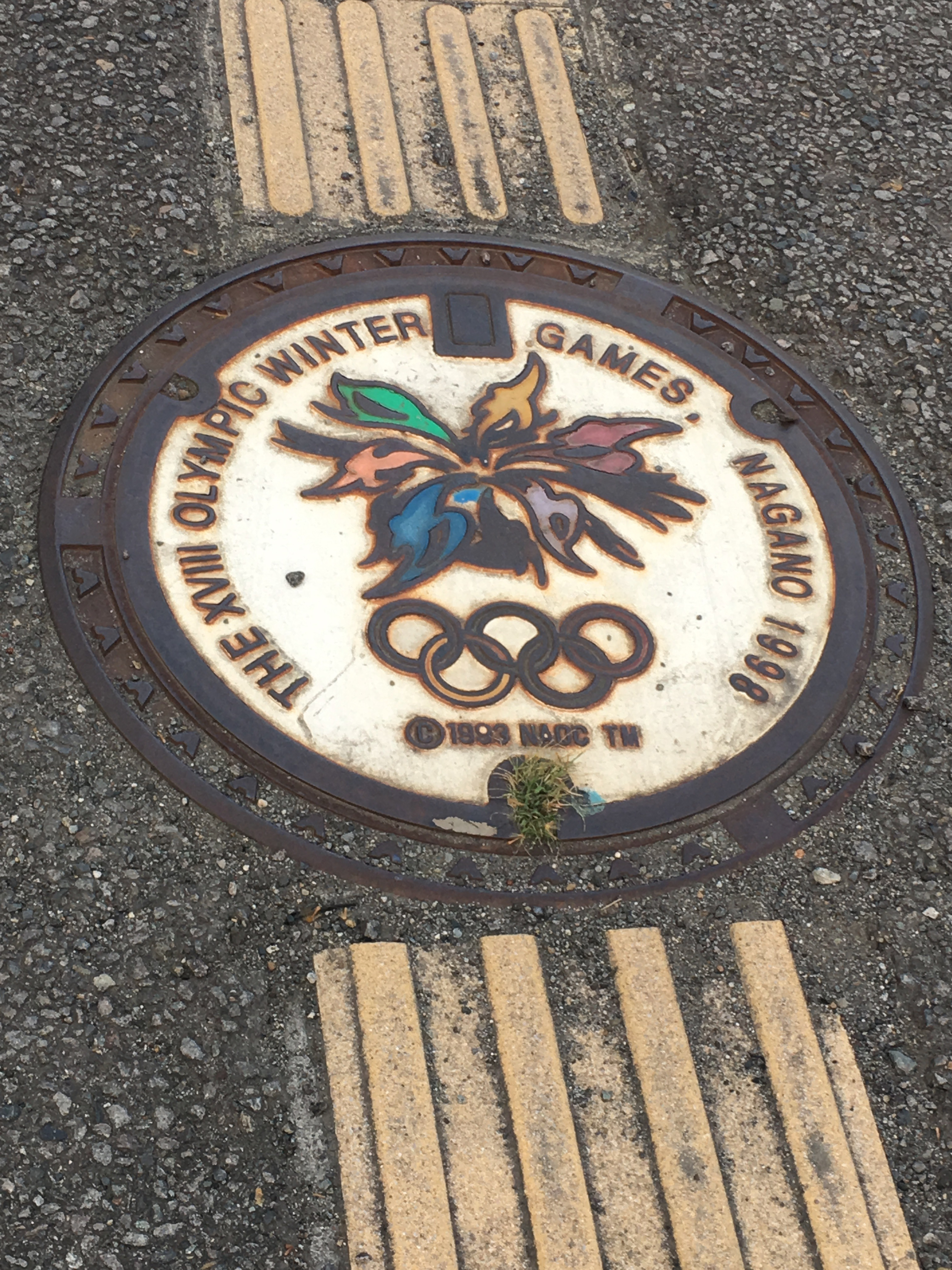
Stylized manhole cover displaying the Nagano Olympics emblem, with tactile paving

The emblem of the 1998 Winter Olympics consisted of a stylized snow flower with each petal representing the pictogram of each sport in the Games'program. The figure could also represent a snowflake, or a mountain flower, which refers to the importance of the natural environment to the city of Nagano. Similarly, Tokyo used cherry blossoms in its logo for its candidature for the 2020 Summer Olympics.

Landor Associates conceived the official mascots that were used by the communication team for the Games. They consisted of four owlets, Sukki, Nokki, Lekki and Tsukki, also called Snowlets. The names were chosen from more than 47,000 suggestions. Four represents the number of years at the Olympic Cycle, and also represent the four elements, fire, air, earth, and water.

The official poster for the Games was designed by the graphic designer Masuteru Aoba presented a thrush perched on ski poles with light in the background shining on snow-capped mountain peaks. Here, as with the emblem and the mascots, the importance of the natural environment in these Olympic Games and a desire to create harmony between athletes and the natural surroundings are shown. In addition to the official poster, a separate poster was created for the opening ceremony. (Note: Hanazawa 1999a, pp. 110–111) Marketing for the games cost the organizing committee 5.9 billion yen.

These Olympic Games were sponsored by 11 worldwide partners, 8 gold partners, and 18 official supports and suppliers. Marketing revenues for sponsoring or for the rights to use the emblems and mascots of the Games totaled 31.3 billion yen.

==== Mascots ====
Sukki, Nokki, Lekki and Tsukki, also known as the Snowlets, are the 1998 Winter Olympic mascots and are four snowy owls. They represent respectively fire (Sukki), air (Nokki), earth (Lekki) and water (Tsukki) and together they represent the four major islands of Japan.

==== Sponsors of the 1998 Winter Olympics ====
The development of Rights Packages were based on International Olympic Committee policy of offering exclusive rights to a limited number of companies, with one company allowed to purchase the rights for any single product or service category, and these were based on previous Games, with adaptations for the local market. Sponsors were permitted to use the emblem and mascots as long as consent was obtained from the International Olympic Committee, Japanese Olympic Committee, and the NAOC. Hospitality packages for sponsors included priority for accommodations, tickets, and transportation services. The Sponsor Hospitality Village, next to the Nagano Olympic Stadium, welcomed 32,000 guests.

To promote awareness of the sponsors, advertising was done in various media from 1995, and on banners and buses immediately before the games. Dick Pound noted, during the Games, the excellence of the marketing program, citing the "perfect example of how the private and public sectors can work together".

The Games had 11 Worldwide Olympic Partners, eight Gold Sponsors and 18 Official Supporters and Suppliers.

Worldwide Olympic Partners:

- The Coca-Cola Company
- IBM
- John Hancock Financial
- Kodak
- McDonald's
- Panasonic
- Samsung Electronics
- Time Inc.
- United Parcel Service
- Visa Inc.
- Xerox (Fuji Xerox)

Gold Sponsors:

- Amway
- Hachijuni Bank
- KDDI
- Kirin Company
- Mizuno Corporation
- Nippon Telegraph and Telephone
- Seiko
- Toyota

Official Supporters and Suppliers:

- Bridgestone
- Brother Industries
- Corona Corp.
- Hanamaruki Foods
- Hitachi Zosen Corporation
- Idemitsu Kosan
- Japan Agricultural Cooperatives
- Japan Airlines
- KOKUYO
- MAYEKAWA
- Marudai Foods
- Oji Paper Company
- Pia Corporation
- Sankosya Corporation
- Snow Brand Milk Products
- Tokio Marine
- Tokyo Gas
- Yamazaki Baking

=== Ticket sales ===
From 7 February 1997, the organizing committee put up for sale 1,286,000 tickets for the various competitions and ceremonies. The number of tickets sold was 1,149,615, which represented 89.4% of available tickets. Including people connected to the Games, the total number of spectators was 1,275,529. This number was slightly higher than in 1994 as a result of the greater availability of tickets. This reflected the total capacity of the arenas used, which were mostly larger than those used four years earlier but slightly lower than the 1988 Winter Olympics in Calgary. Tickets sales were a success in the domestic market, as the Japanese people finished the process of purchase with a reservation list of 6 million. For the most popular events, a lottery system was used. In total, ticket sales raised 10.5 billion yen for the organizing committee.

The ice hockey matches represented 295,802 tickets sold, 26% of the total. Tickets sold for alpine skiing totaled 166,092; for ski jumping, 96,000, and speed skating, 93,000. For multiple sports, ski jumping, Nordic combined, freestyle skiing, all three skating disciplines, bobsleigh, and curling, as well as the ceremonies, all tickets were sold. By contrast, due to the local demands and low interest only 56.6% of the 146,000 available tickets for cross-country skiing were sold.

=== Cost and cost overrun ===
The Oxford Olympics Study established the outturn cost of the Nagano 1998 Winter Olympics at US$2.2 billion in 2015-dollars and cost overrun at 56% in real terms. This includes sports-related costs only, that is, (i) operational costs incurred by the organizing committee for the purpose of staging the Games, e.g., expenditures for technology, transportation, workforce, administration, security, catering, ceremonies, and medical services, and (ii) direct capital costs incurred by the host city and country or private investors to build, e.g., the competition venues, the Olympic village, international broadcast center, and media and press center, which are required to host the Games. Indirect capital costs are not included, such as for road, rail, or airport infrastructure, or for hotel upgrades or other business investment incurred in preparation for the Games but not directly related to staging the Games. The cost and cost overrun for Nagano 1998 compares with costs of US$2.5 billion and a cost overrun of 13% for Vancouver 2010, and costs of US$51 billion and a cost overrun of 289% for Sochi 2014, the latter being the most costly Olympics to date. Average cost for Winter Games since 1960 is US$3.1 billion, average cost overrun is 142%.

== Venues ==
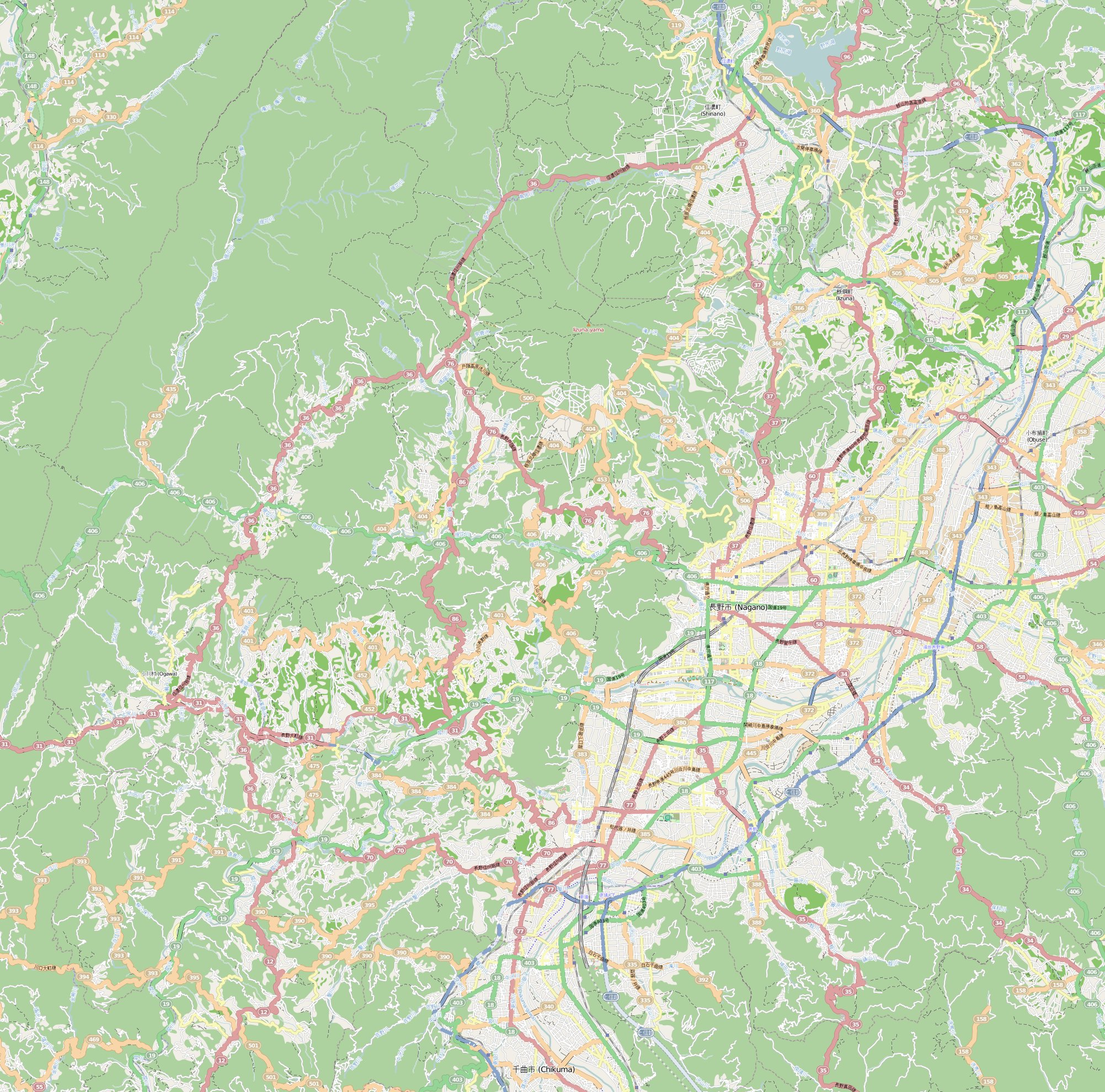
Map of the 1998 Nagano Olympic venues within Nagano City

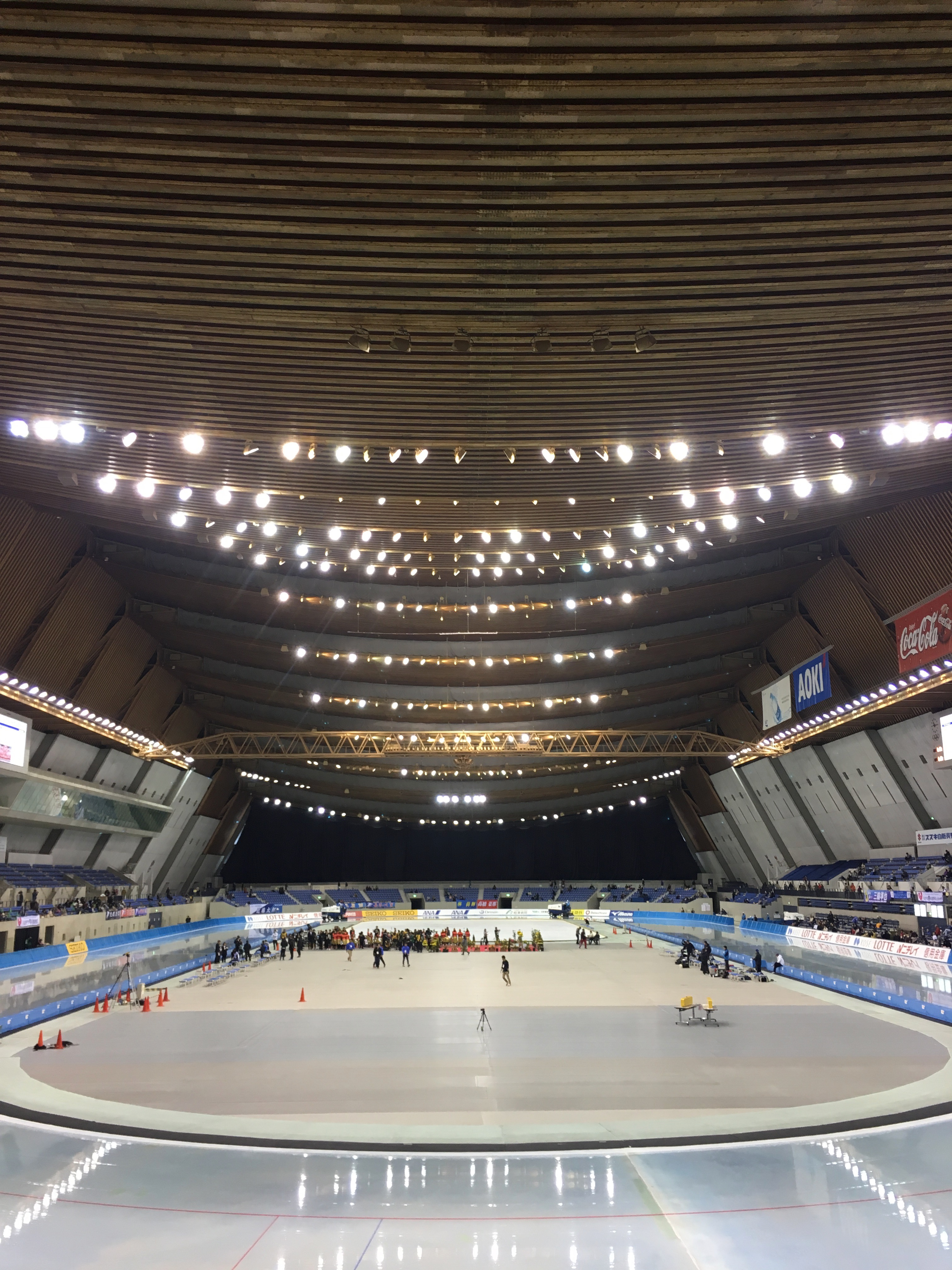
M-Wave interior

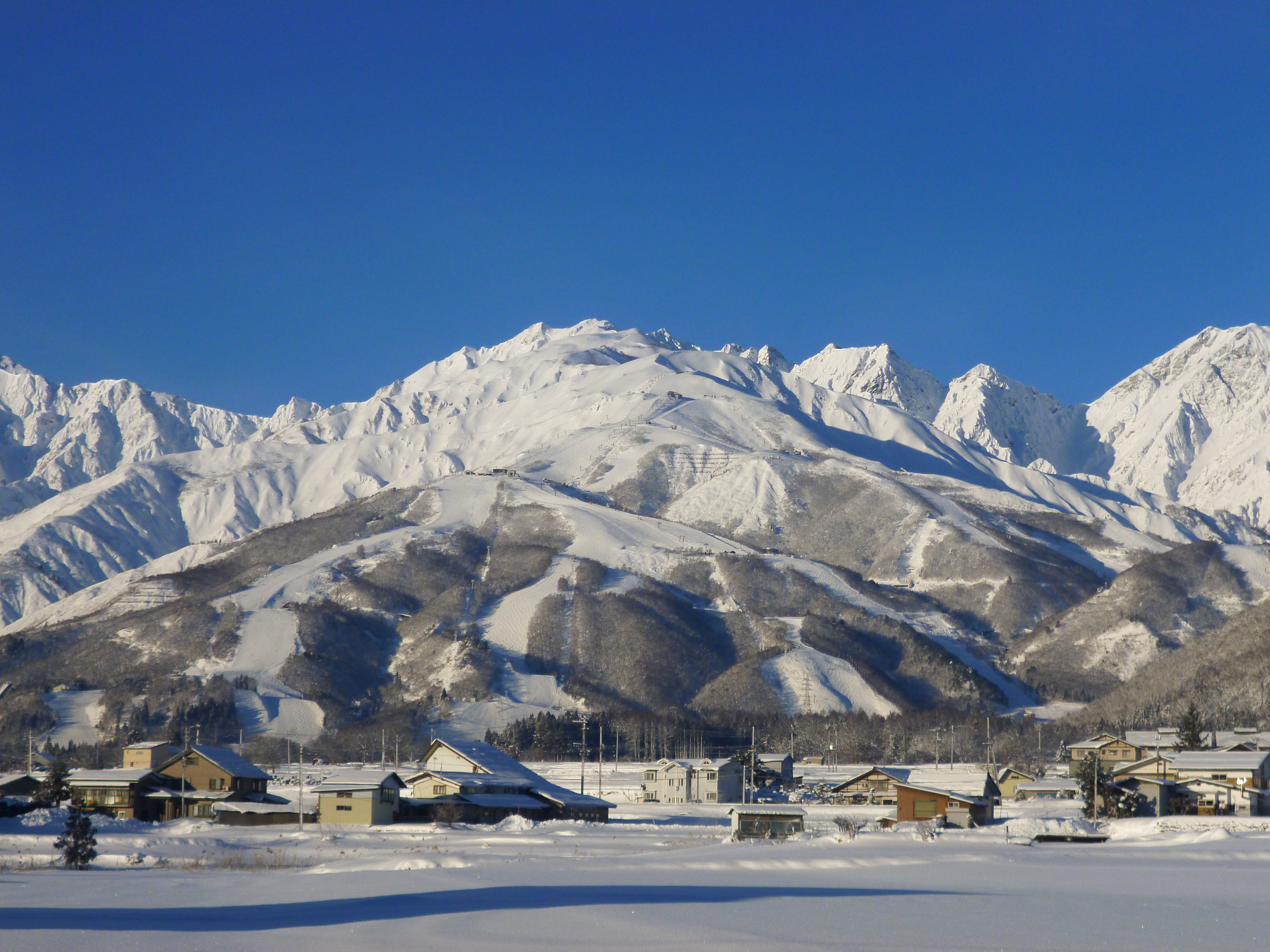
Hakuba Happo'one Resort

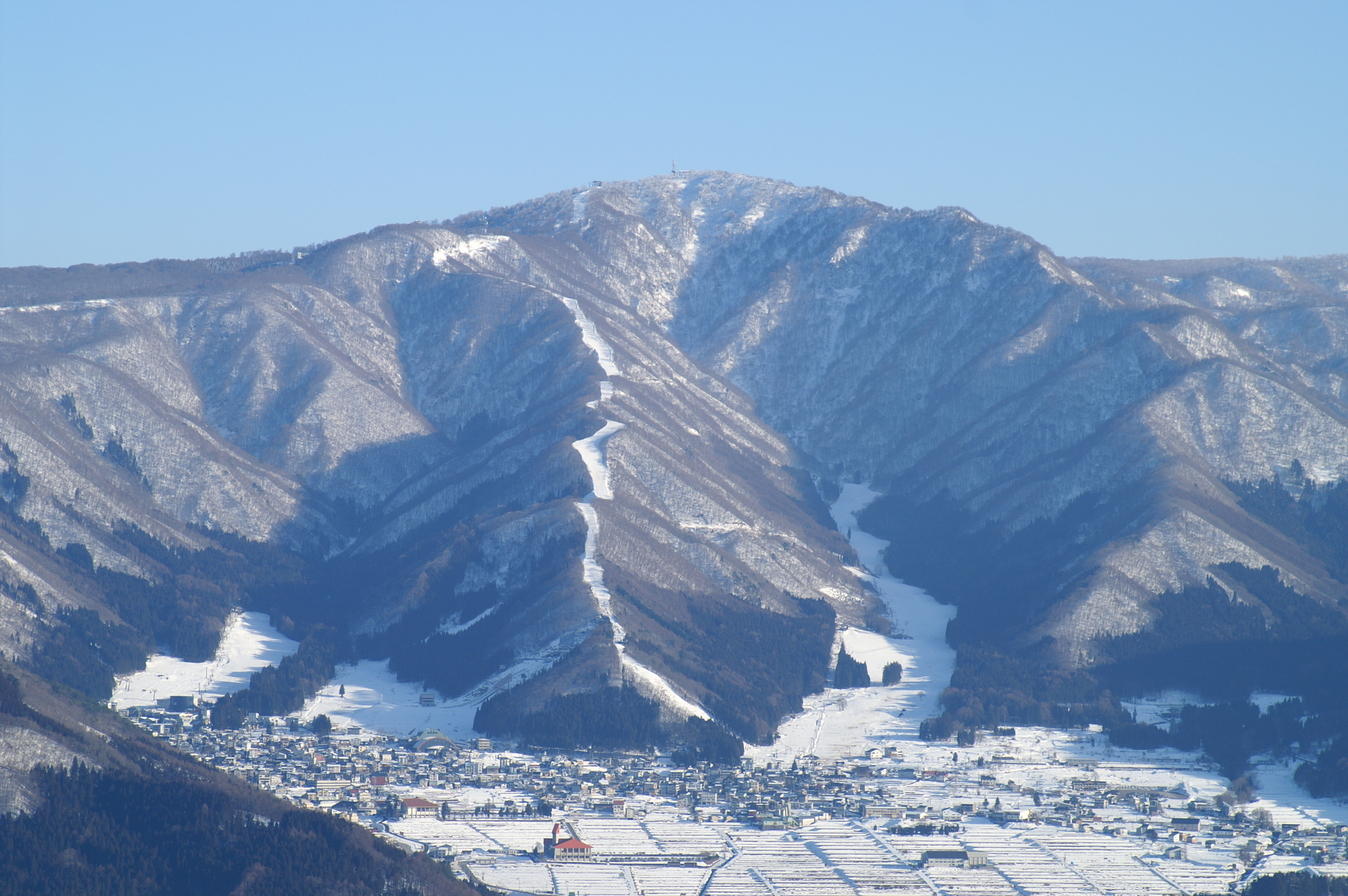
Nozawa Onsen Ski Resort

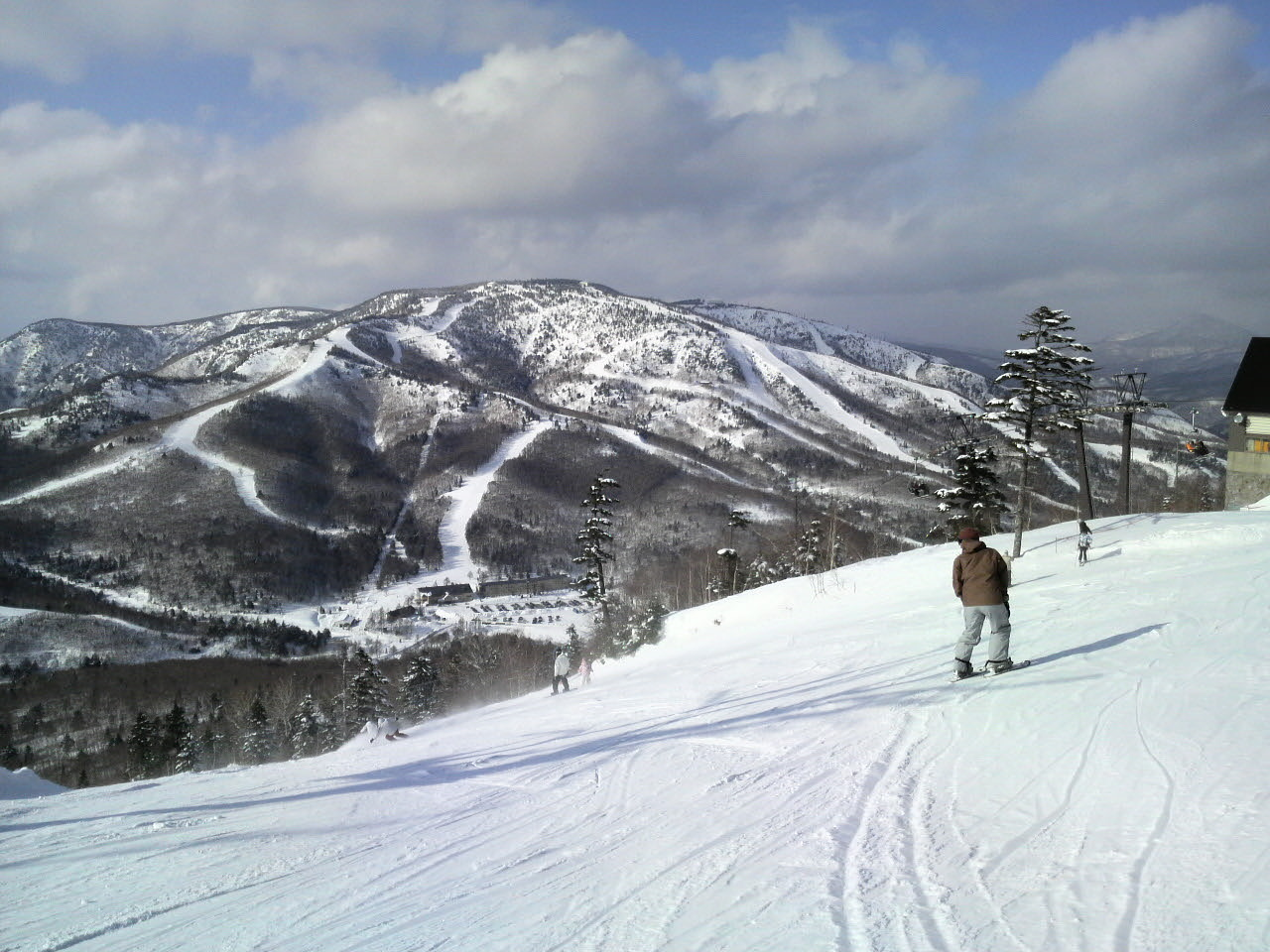
Mount Yakebitai

=== Sport Venues ===
During the 1998 Winter Olympics, a total of fourteen sports venues, all within Nagano Prefecture, were used. Construction of these venues lasted 7 years between 1990 and 1997, with construction and land costs totaling ¥106.6 billion. (Note: Hanazawa 1999a, p. 184) The most expensive venue constructed for the games was the M-Wave who hosted the speed skating events.This venue is in a distance from 5 kilometers from Nagano Station. Between March 1996 and November 1997, these sites were tested with 16 different World Championship events, World Cups, and another international competitions to allow the organizers to prepare for the running of the Games. (Note: Hanazawa 1999a, p. 162)

Five new venues were used, localized all inside city of Nagano urban area. The project to build the Olympic Stadium and the 4 indoor arenas was planned even before the plans for the Olympic bid. However, these plans were accelerated soon after the submission of the proposal to the Japanese Olympic Committee, as the city had no infrastructure available for any type of event available. The Nagano Olympic Stadium is the main sporting venue of the south of city, is on nearby Shinonoi Station, and approximately 9 kilometers from Nagano Station. Outside from their structure, the stadium, who resembles a cherry blossom, one of main symbols of Japan.During the Games, the arena was exclusively used for the opening and closing ceremonies and, when added to the temporary infrastructure, its capacity reached 50.000. (Note: Hanazawa 1999b, p. 128)

The Big Hat Arena was the ice hockey main venue.is approximately located 2 km from Nagano Station and have a capacity of 10,104 spectators. (Note: Hanazawa 1999b, p. 219) Another arena, the Aqua Wing Arena, the second ice hockey venue. Shaped like a wing, it had a capacity of 6000 during the Olympics. After the Games, it was modified into a public indoor swimming with a 25m pool. (Note: Hanazawa 1999b, p. 224) Aqua Wing is approximately 5 kilometers from Nagano Station. Its closest stations are Kita-Nagano Station and Asahi Station. M-Wave, the speed skating venue, is the first indoor track speed skating venue in Japan. It was built to accommodate 10,000 spectators. (Note: Hanazawa 1999b, p. 213) The venue, which gets its name from its M-shape, representing the surrounding mountains and harmonize with the skyline, is approximately 5 kilometers from Nagano Station. Finally, White Ring, with a maximum capacity of 7.351 spectators, was built for figure skating and short track speed skating. (Note: Hanazawa 1999b, p. 217) White Ring, which is used as a public gymnasium, is approximately 6 kilometers from Nagano Station.

Hakuba village is situated 50 kilometers west of the city of Nagano. Hakuba hosted three Olympics venues Alpine skiing's downhill, super-G and combined were situated at Happo'one Resort. Three courses between altitudes of 840 meters and 1,765 meters were used, one for the men's, women's and combined for both men's and women's. The site had a capacity of 20,000 spectators. (Note: Hanazawa 1999b, p. 187) Hakuba Ski Jumping Stadium was the first ski jump built in Japan with parallel 90 and 120 K-point hills. The ski jumping stadium could accommodate 45,000 spectators. (Note: Hanazawa 1999b, p. 204) Snow Harp Kamishiro was built for cross country skiing and Nordic combined. It includes three tracks of 4.8, 4.8, and 7.8 kilometers.The stadium area is near 1.2 km2. In total, Snow Harp has 19 kilometers of tracks. Up to 20,000 spectators could be accommodated. (Note: Hanazawa 1999b, p. 201)

Nozawa Onsen Ski Resort, in the town of Nozawaonsen, was site of biathlon. Nozawa is approximately 50 kilometers north of Nagano. At Nozawa Onsen, the stadium was built around six existing tracks. Two tracks, of 4 kilometers and 7 kilometers, were used for the Games. The stadium could accommodate 20,000 spectators. (Note: Hanazawa 1999b, p. 232)

Two sites in the town of Yamanouchi, approximately 30 kilometers northeast of Nagano, were used. Giant slalom was held at Mount Yakebitai at Shiga Kogen Resort, at an altitude between 1,530 and 1,969 meters. The site could accommodate 20,000 spectators. Also in Shiga Kogen, at Mount Higashidate, giant slalom events in Alpine skiing and snowboarding were held. (Note: Hanazawa 1999b, p. 192) Kanbayashi Snowboard Park was the site of the half pipe event in snowboarding . The track is 120 meters long and 15 meters wide, with walls of 3.5 meters. 10,000 spectators could be accommodated at Kanbayashi. (Note: Hanazawa 1999b, p. 201)

The town of Iizuna, approximately 12 kilometers northwest of Nagano, was the site of freestyle skiing and bobsleigh, luge, and skeleton at Iizuna Kogen Ski Area. 8,000 spectators could watch the free style skiing on a course that 250 meters long and 12,000 could the jumps. (Note: Hanazawa 1999b, p. 207) The Spiral, which held the sledding events, was the first artificially refrigerated track in Asia. It is 1700 meters long, with a difference in height of 114 meters and 15 turns. At the Spiral, approximately 40,000 saplings, mainly beech and oak, were planted two per square meter, as part of the environmental stewardship committed during the Winter Games. The site could accommodate 10,000 spectators. (Note: Hanazawa 1999b, p. 228)

Finally, the town of Karuizawa, approximately 80 kilometers southeast of Nagano, hosted the curling events at Kazakoshi Park Arena. The venue was built as a multi-purpose venue. Its ice surface is 60 meters by 30. Its maximum capacity is 1,924 spectators. (Note: Hanazawa 1999b, p. 234) The same venue also hosted the equestrian events at the 1964 Summer Olympics, thus becoming the first venue to host both the Summer Olympics and Winter Olympics.

=== Accommodation ===
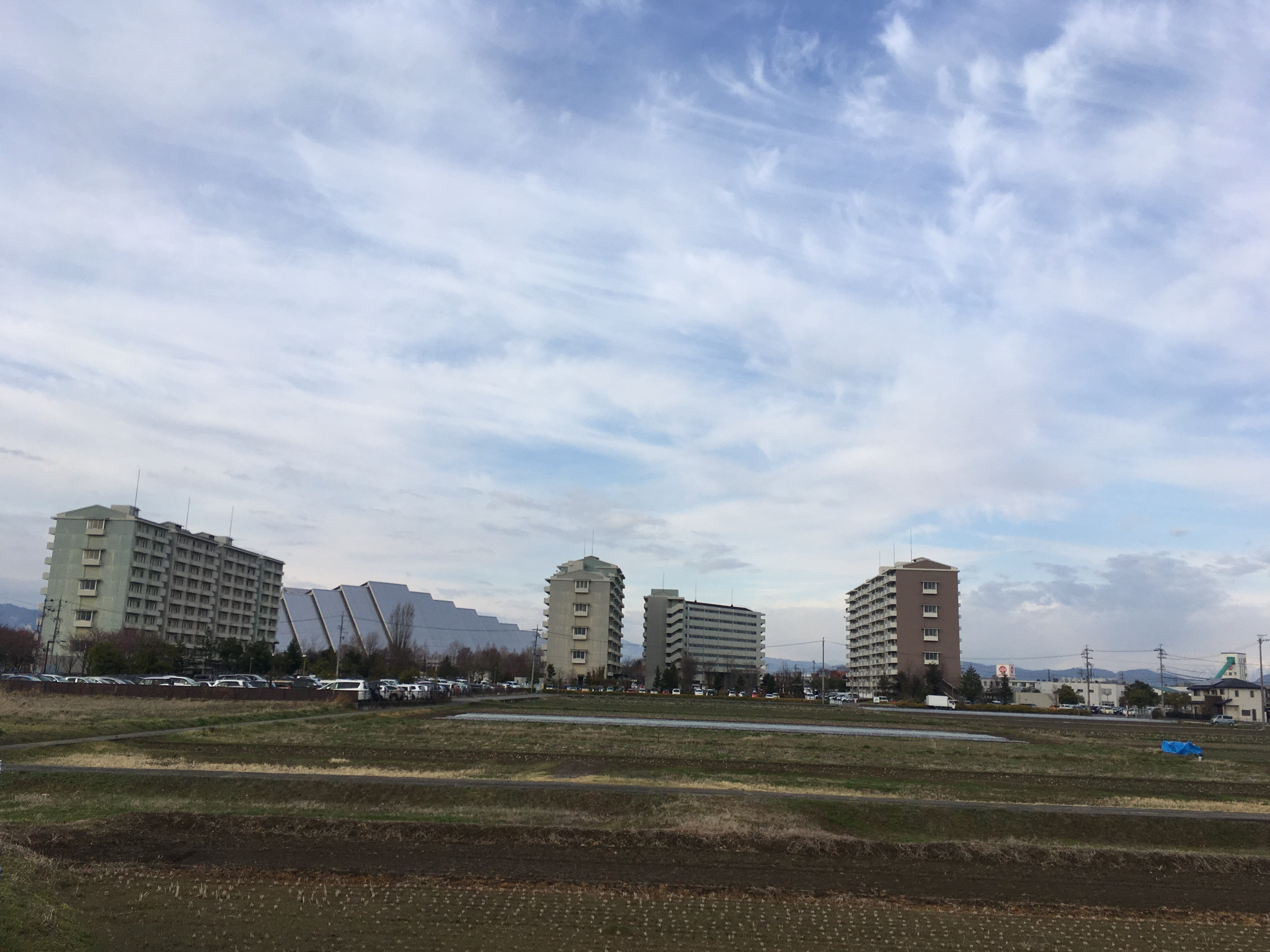
Media Village at Asahi, with the M-Wave in the background

To accommodate the athletes and officials during the Games, the main Olympic Village was constructed in Imai district, this complex approximately 7 kilometers south of Nagano Station. Along with the construction of the village, Imai Station was opened in 1997. The responsibility for the construction of these buildings lay with the Nagano City, as a future public and low coast residential housing and was loaned to the organizing committee during the Games. (Note: Hanazawa 1999b, p. 240) The main Village occupies an area that is 19 hectares, composed of 23 buildings with a total of 1,032 apartments. (Note: Hanazawa 1999b, p. 240) Temporary infrastrure were also available during the Games. The Village was open for the Olympics from 24 January to 25 February 1998 and 1 to 19 March for the Paralympics, and accommodated nearby 4,000 people during the two events. (Note: Hanazawa 1999b, p. 238) Several prominent people were recognized as faces of the Olympic Village, including the Honorary Mayor Yasuko Konoe, Mayor Shozo Sasahara, and Deputy Mayors Takanori Kono, Hiroko Chiba, and Shunichi Bobby Hirai. (Note: Hanazawa 1999b, p. 243)

As the curling venue was in Karuizawa, 90 kilometers away, a satellite village was built in Karuizawa, 7 kilometers from the arena. (Note: Hanazawa 1999b, p. 250) It was open from 4 to 16 February 1998. In addition, a section of the Shiga Kogen Resort, 58 kilometers from the Olympic Village, was reserved for 180 snowboarders and officials. (Note: Hanazawa 1999b, p. 251)

In addition to athletes and officials, members of the Olympic and Paralympic family and other personnel were housed in 900 hotels and another structures in Nagano and surrounding regions, which represented 234,207 nights between 24 January to 25 February 1998. The Olympic and Paralympic families stayed in the Kokusai 21 Hotel in downtown Nagano. In total, the Olympic and Paralympic families included 18,350 people. Finally, two media villages were built in the districts of Yanagimachi, near Nagano Station, and Asahi, across the street from the M-Wave. (Note: Hanazawa 1999a, p. 258)

== The Games ==
=== The Olympic torch relay ===
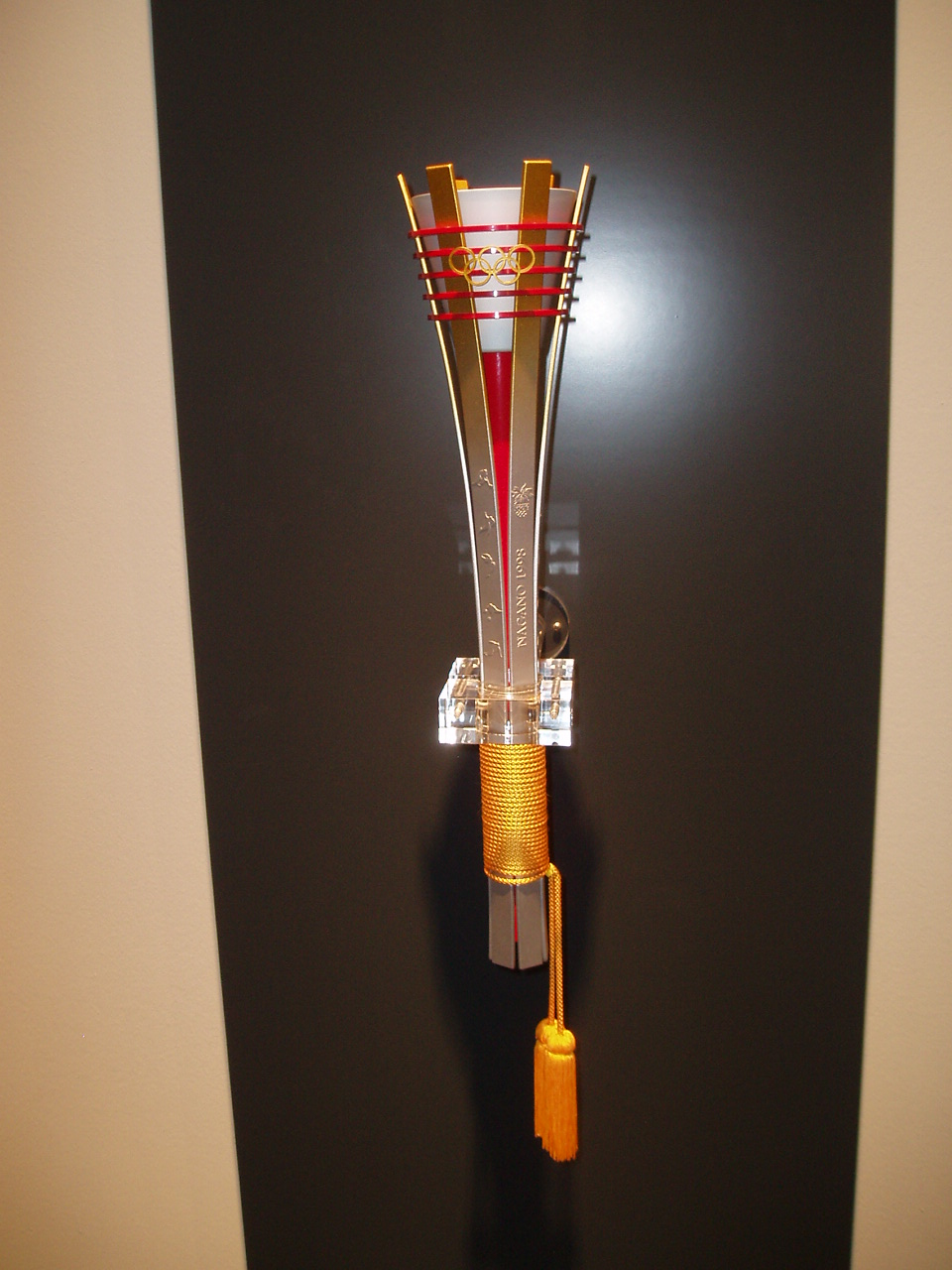
The Nagano Olympic torch, displayed at the Olympic Museum in Nagano

The Olympic torch was lit by sunlight during the ceremony held Temple of Hera at Olympia, Greece on 19 December 1997. Vassilis Dimitriadis, a Greek alpine skier started the Greek leg towards Athens where the handover ceremony was held at the Panathenaic Stadium. The flame burned from 27 to 30 December in the Ginza yard, and from 31 December to 4 January in the Yoyogi Park. On the morning on that day the flame was split into three and taken by plane to three destinations: the Kantō route, starting from Hokkaido; the Pacific Ocean route, starting from Kagoshima; and the Sea of Japan route starting in Okinawa. On 23 January evening, the three flames arrived on Nagano Prefecture after 120 stops. Finally, these three routes were unified in the city of Nagano in on the night of 6 February. The following day, after traveling through each district of the city, the relays simultaneously arrived at the central square where three former athletes passed the flames to three members of the organizing committee who lit a celebration cauldron gathering the flame into one. After that, the unified flame was used to light another torch held by Juan Antonio Samaranch. In the early hours of the 7 February morning, the final leg started and the flame travelled another 10 kilometers to the Olympic Stadium and the figure skater Midori Ito lit the cauldron at Nagano Olympic Stadium during the opening ceremonies.

The Olympic Flame Relay in Japan was sponsored by Coca-Cola, lasted 33 days and travelled 1,162 kilometers. A group of 5.5 million people took part in relay activities. Over the distance of the relay, the flame was always followed by a group of six people: the torchbearer who carried the flame, some who accompanied the carrier, and four people in supporting roles, for a total of 6,901 people. In addition, each leg was followed by two groups of 11 vehicles and more than 20 people.

The torch was shaped like a traditional Japanese taimatsu torch. It was made of aluminum, was 55 centimeters long, and weighed 1.3 kilograms when it was assembled. The exterior of the torch was coloured silver, to represent winter. Runners wore blue and white uniforms mixing blue as the main colour of the look of the games and the white as snow. The runners' uniforms included logos for the Nagano Olympics and the Olympic Games, a logo of the relay, and of Coca-Cola.

=== Participating National Olympic Committees ===
72 nations participated in the 1998 Winter Olympic Games for a total of 2,176 athletes, of which 787 were female and 1,389 were male. With the addition of five countries and another 439 athletes since the 1994 Winter Olympic Games at Lillehammer, Norway, these were the largest Winter Olympics ever at the time. The nations of Azerbaijan, Kenya, Macedonia, Uruguay, and Venezuela participated in their first Winter Olympic Games. Iran returned to the Winter games after a 22-year absence, and North Korea, India and Ireland returned after 6 years. Yugoslavia appeared again as the Federal Republic of Yugoslavia. Five countries, Fiji, Mexico, San Marino, American Samoa, and Senegal, which were at the 1994 Games, did not participate in 1998.

The United States had the largest athlete delegation with 186, followed by host Japan with 156, Canada with 144, and Germany with 125. Despite the large number of participating delegations, 40 of the 72 delegations had less than 10 athletes, with 12 nations having one sole athlete. 15 nations had between 11 and 50 athletes, 11 nations had between 51 and 100 athletes, and six nations had more than 101 athletes. Nations that participated in the ice hockey tournaments generally had the largest athlete delegations. With the exception of Norway and Switzerland, all 12 national delegations with 60 or more athletes participated in either or both of the female or male ice hockey tournaments.

Participating for the first time. Having previously participated. Not participating. Yellow circle is host city (Nagano)

Countries by team size

The number in parentheses represents the number of athletes participating in official events.

Participating National Olympic Committees
- Andorra (3)
- Argentina (2)
- Armenia (7)
- Australia (23)
- Austria (96)
- Azerbaijan (4)
- Belarus (59)
- Belgium (1)
- Bermuda (1)
- Bosnia and Herzegovina (8)
- Brazil (1)
- Bulgaria (19)
- Canada (144)
- Chile (3)
- China (57)
- Chinese Taipei (7)
- Croatia (6)
- Cyprus (1)
- Czech Republic (61)
- Denmark (12)
- Estonia (20)
- Finland (85)
- France (106)
- Georgia (4)
- Germany (125)
- Great Britain (34)
- Greece (13)
- Hungary (17)
- Iceland (7)
- India (1)
- Iran (1)
- Ireland (6)
- Israel (3)
- Italy (113)
- Jamaica (6)
- Japan (156) (host)
- Kazakhstan (60)
- Kenya (1)
- Kyrgyzstan (1)
- Latvia (29)
- Liechtenstein (8)
- Lithuania (7)
- Luxembourg (1)
- Macedonia (3)
- Moldova (2)
- Monaco (4)
- Mongolia (3)
- Netherlands (22)
- New Zealand (8)
- North Korea (8)
- Norway (76)
- Poland (39)
- Portugal (2)
- Puerto Rico (6)
- Romania (16)
- Russia (122)
- Slovakia (37)
- Slovenia (34)
- South Africa (2)
- South Korea (37)
- Spain (12)
- Sweden (99)
- Switzerland (69)
- Trinidad and Tobago (2)
- Turkey (1)
- Ukraine (56)
- United States (186)
- Uruguay (1)
- Uzbekistan (4)
- Venezuela (1)
- Virgin Islands (7)
- FR Yugoslavia (2)

=== Number of athletes by National Olympic Committee ===
2,176 athletes from 72 NOCs

IOC Letter Code	Country	Athletes
USA	United States	186
JPN	Japan	156
CAN	Canada	144
GER	Germany	125
RUS	Russia	122
ITA	Italy	113
FRA	France	106
SWE	Sweden	99
AUT	Austria	96
FIN	Finland	85
NOR	Norway	76
SUI	Switzerland	69
CZE	Czech Republic	61
KAZ	Kazakhstan	60
BLR	Belarus	59
CHN	China	57
UKR	Ukraine	56
POL	Poland	39
KOR	South Korea	37
SVK	Slovakia	37
GBR	Great Britain	34
SLO	Slovenia	34
LAT	Latvia	29
AUS	Australia	23
NED	Netherlands	22
EST	Estonia	20
BUL	Bulgaria	19
HUN	Hungary	17
ROU	Romania	16
GRE	Greece	13
DEN	Denmark	12
ESP	Spain	12
BIH	Bosnia and Herzegovina	8
PRK	North Korea	8
LIE	Liechtenstein	8
NZL	New Zealand	8
ARM	Armenia	7
ISL	Iceland	7
LTU	Lithuania	7
TPE	Chinese Taipei	7
ISV	Virgin Islands	7
CRO	Croatia	6
IRL	Ireland	6
JAM	Jamaica	6
PUR	Puerto Rico	6
AZE	Azerbaijan	4
GEO	Georgia	4
MON	Monaco	4
UZB	Uzbekistan	4
AND	Andorra	3
CHI	Chile	3
ISR	Israel	3
MKD	Macedonia	3
MGL	Mongolia	3
ARG	Argentina	2
MDA	Moldova	2
POR	Portugal	2
RSA	South Africa	2
TRI	Trinidad and Tobago	2
YUG	FR Yugoslavia	2
BEL	Belgium	1
BER	Bermuda	1
BRA	Brazil	1
CYP	Cyprus	1
IND	India	1
IRI	Iran	1
KEN	Kenya	1
KGZ	Kyrgyzstan	1
LUX	Luxembourg	1
TUR	Turkey	1
URU	Uruguay	1
VEN	Venezuela	1

=== Calendar ===
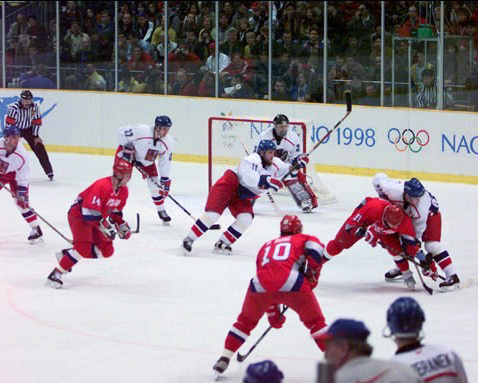
The men's ice hockey gold medal game: Russia vs Czech Republic.

The 1998 Winter Olympics were held in a period of 15 days, from 7–22 February. The number of events increased from 61 at the 1994 Winter Olympics to 68 in 1998. Two sports, curling and snowboarding were added to the program, as was women's ice hockey. This increased the number of sports to seven, and the number of disciplines to 14. The sporting program started and ended with men's ice hockey.The first matches started at 4:00 pm on 7 February featuring Kazakhstan defeating Italy 5–3, and Slovakia tying Austria 2–2. The final match was played on Sunday 22 February from 1:45 pm, and the Czech Republic defeated Russia 1–0.The first final was held at the morning of day 8 in the Cross-country skiing .Due to adverse weather conditions, the schedule for multiple events were delayed or changed, including six alpine skiing events, snowboarding, and biathlon.

All dates are in Japan Standard Time (UTC+9)

OC	Opening ceremony	●	Event competitions	1	Event finals	CC	Closing ceremony

February 1998	7th Sat	8th Sun	9th Mon	10th Tue	11th Wed	12th Thu	13th Fri	14th Sat	15th Sun	16th Mon	17th Tue	18th Wed	19th Thu	20th Fri	21st Sat	22nd Sun	Events
Ceremonies	OC															CC	—N/a
Alpine skiing				●	1		2			2	1		2	1	1		10
Biathlon			1		1				1			1	1		1		6
Bobsleigh								●	1					●	1		2
Cross country skiing		1	1	1		2		1		1		1		1		1	10
Curling			●	●	●	●	●	●	2								2
Figure skating		●		1		●	●	1	●	1		●		1			4
Freestyle skiing		●			2					●		2					4
Ice hockey	●	●	●	●	●	●	●	●	●	●	1	●		●	●	1	2
Luge		●	1	●	1		1										3
Nordic combined							●	1					●	1			2
Short track											2		1		3		6
Ski jumping					1				1		1						3
Snowboarding		1		2		1											4
Speed skating		1	●	1	1	1	●	1	1	1	1		1	1			10
Daily medal events		3	3	5	7	4	3	4	6	5	6	4	5	5	6	2	68
Cumulative total		3	6	11	18	22	25	29	35	40	46	50	55	60	66	68	68
February 1998	7th Sat	8th Sun	9th Mon	10th Tue	11th Wed	12th Thu	13th Fri	14th Sat	15th Sun	16th Mon	17th Tue	18th Wed	19th Thu	20th Fri	21st Sat	22nd Sun	Total events

=== Ceremonies ===
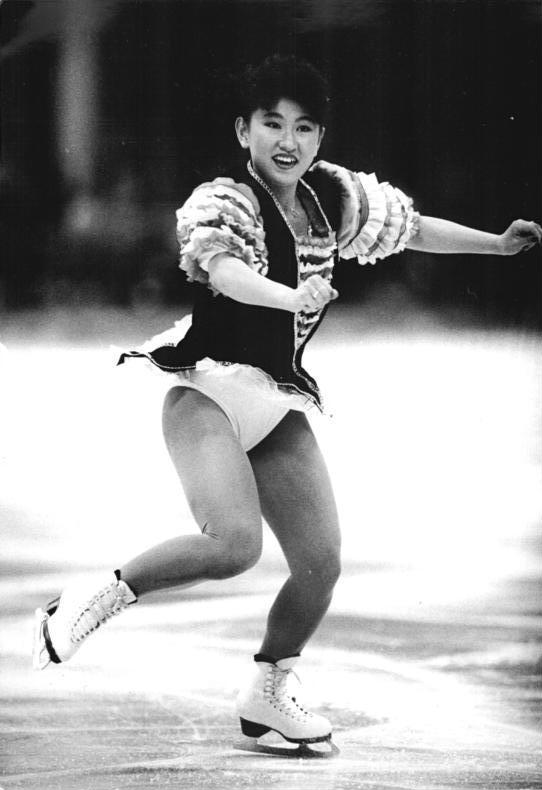
Midori Ito (seen here in 1989) lit the cauldron at the opening ceremony.

==== Opening ceremony ====
The opening ceremony took place at the Nagano Olympic Stadium, Nagano, Japan, on the late morning of 7 February 1998. Japanese figure skater, Midori Ito, the first female skater to land seven triple jumps in a free skating competition and also the first Asian world champion in 1989, and the silver medalist at the 1992 Winter Olympics, lit the cauldron during the ceremony.

Seiji Ozawa, a Japanese conductor, directed an orchestra from five continents (Beijing, Berlin, Cape Town, New York City, and Sydney - and the crowd in the Nagano Olympic Stadium), to perform the fourth movement of Beethoven's Symphony No. 9 (Ode to Joy). This was the first time a simultaneous international audio-visual performance had been achieved and was also the last time that the Olympics Opening ceremonies were held on a morning timeslot in the host city.

In all, 2,302 athletes from 72 National Olympic Committees participated in the Games, including 814 female athletes and 1488 male athletes. Both the number of participating delegations and the number of athletes participating in the competition were, at the time, the most ever hosted at the Winter Olympics.

==== Medal ceremonies ====
According to the version of the Olympic Charter in force at the time (approved on September 3, 1997), only award ceremonies for indoor events (such as skating, ice hockey, and curling) and those scheduled for the final day of competition could be held at the event venues immediately after the finals. Ceremonies for outdoor events, on the other hand, were split into two parts: first, a flower or gift ceremony at the venue right after the event, followed that same evening by the official medal ceremony in a public square. In Nagano, this took place at the Nagano City Central Square, located roughly halfway between Nagano Station and Zenkō-ji. A total of 167,200 tickets were sold for these ceremonies, which featured performances by national and international artists every evening prior to the medal presentations. (Note: Hanazawa 1999b, p. 140) (Note: Hanazawa 1999b, pp. 138–139) For the medal ceremonies, a total 167,200 tickets were sold. National and international artists presented every evening at the place before the medal presentations. (Note: Hanazawa 1999b, p. 140)

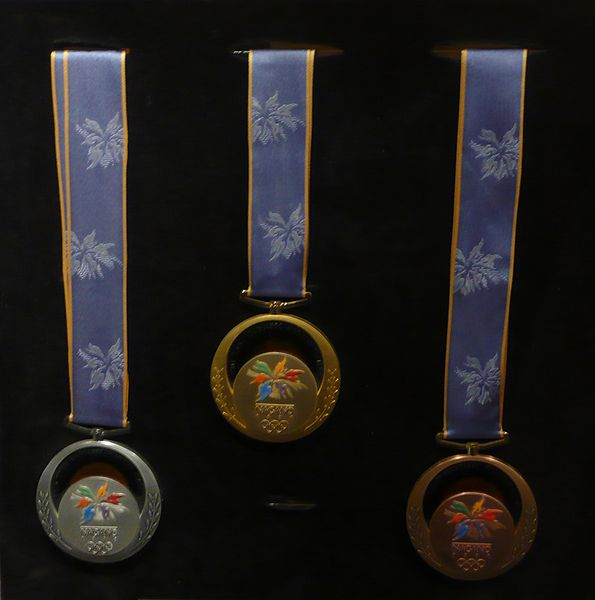
The silver, gold and bronze medals of Nagano 1998

The gold, silver, and bronze medals each measured 80 mm in diameter and 9.7 mm in thickness. (Note: Hanazawa 1999b, p. 140) The gold medals weighed 256 g, the silver 250 g, and the bronze 230 g. (Note: Hanazawa 1999b, p. 140) The medals were made using a traditional Japanese lacquerware technique known as 漆器 (shikki), in which a brass core is imprinted with the design by layering gold powder onto the wet lacquer using a method called maki-e. (Note: Hanazawa 1999b, p. 140) On the front of the medals are borders of olive leaves, and in the center, a maki-e morning sun rises over a cloisonné emblem of the Nagano Olympics. (Note: Hanazawa 1999b, p. 140) On the reverse side, the snowflower emblem of the Games sits above a maki-e image of the mountains surrounding Nagano glowing in the morning sunrise. (Note: Hanazawa 1999b, p. 140) The initial lacquering was handcrafted by artisans from the Kiso, Nagano, and the metals components were added at the Mint Bureau of the Japanese Ministry of Finance. (Note: Hanazawa 1999b, p. 140)

In addition to the medals awarded to the athletes in each event, more than 19,000 commemorative medals were given to all athletes, officials, International Olympic Committee members, media personnel, volunteers and others. These medals, made by the Mint Bureau in cooperation with NAOC, were made from an alloy of 90% copper and 10% zinc. (Note: Hanazawa 1999b, p. 140) As the Olympic Charter also determines, diplomas, written in Japanese, French, and English, were given to the top eight finishers in each event, and every participant also received a commemorative diploma. (Note: Hanazawa 1999b, p. 141)

==== Closing ceremony ====
The closing ceremonies, like those of the opening, took place in the Nagano Olympic Stadium, with 50,000 tickets sold. Akihito, the Emperor of Japan at the time, and his wife Empress Michiko were also present. After the athletes entered, hundreds of drums were beat and a traditional hose and lion dance was presented. During the Antwerp Ceremony, Tasuku Tsukada, then mayor of Nagano presented the Olympic Flag to Deedee Corradini, then mayor of Salt Lake City, the host of the 2002 Winter Olympics.After the handover of the flag, the then IOC president Juan Antonio Samaranch declared the games closed. This was followed by a performance from the Japanese singer Anri when the Olympic Cauldron was extinguished. The ceremony ended with the words "Sayonara, Arigato" ("Goodbye, Thank you"), a major fireworks performance accompanied by a party with the song: "Ile Aiye" performed by Japanese pop group Agharta.

=== Medal table ===
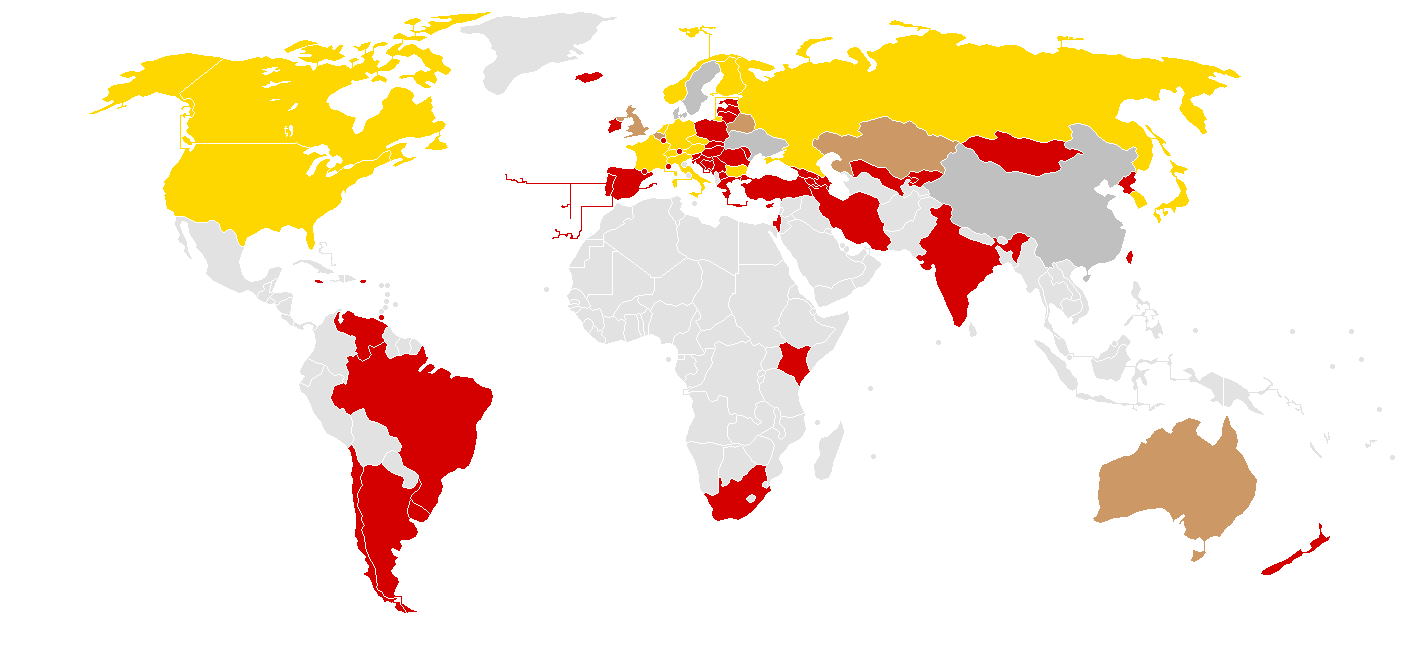
Countries participating at the 1998 Winter Olympics Winners of at least one gold medal Winners of at least one silver medal Winners of at least one bronze medal Countries without a medal Non-participating countries

In all, 24 of the 72 participating National Olympic Committees at these Games won at least one medal, as shown in the table below. A total of 15 countries won at least one gold medal and 18 nations won two or more medals. In total, 205 medals were distributed. Germany finished on top of the table with 29 medals, including 12 gold, nine silver, and eight bronze. Germany, which finished in third place in the medal standings at the 1994 Winter Olympics, won most of its medals in Alpine skiing, speed skating, and luge, in which it won all three gold medals. German female athletes won 22 of the country's 29 medals. Norway finished again in second, with 25 medals, including nine won in cross-country skiing and five in biathlon. Russia, which finished atop the gold medals in 1994, finished in third in 1998, with 9 gold medals, including the five gold at the stake on the women's cross-country skiing.Result of the addition of new sports and events, Canada moved from a discret seventh in 1994 to fourth in 1998 with 6 gold medals, and the United States remained again in fifth place.The Netherlands, which had a discreet campaign in 1994, ended the 1998 Games with the best performance in its history, winning half of the 10 events contested in speed skating and totaling more than a third of the medals up for grabs. Host The host country, Japan had a historic campaign. The country, which until then had only won 3 gold medals in the history of the Winter Games, finished the Games with 5.The japanese team also won 1 silver and 4 bronze medals, in a total of 10. Australia became the second country from the Southern Hemisphere to win a medal, a bronze in alpine skiing. Also, Denmark each won your first ever medal, the silver at women's curling. In addition, Bulgaria and the Czech Republic each won their first gold medals at a Winter Olympics in women's biathlon and men's ice hockey respectively. Finally, Kazakhstan won its first medal from a female athlete.

* Host nation (Japan)

Rank	Nation	Gold	Silver	Bronze	Total
1	Germany	12	9	8	29
2	Norway	10	10	5	25
3	Russia	9	6	3	18
4	Canada	6	5	4	15
5	United States	6	3	4	13
6	Netherlands	5	4	2	11
7	Japan*	5	1	4	10
8	Austria	3	5	9	17
9	South Korea	3	1	2	6
10	Italy	2	6	2	10
Totals (10 entries)		61	50	43	154

=== Podium sweeps ===
Date	Sport	Event	NOC	Gold	Silver	Bronze
11 February	Speed skating	Women's 3,000 m	Germany	Gunda Niemann-Stirnemann	Claudia Pechstein	Anni Friesinger
13 February	Alpine skiing	Women's combined	Germany	Katja Seizinger	Martina Ertl-Renz	Hilde Gerg
17 February	Speed skating	Men's 10,000 metres	Netherlands	Gianni Romme	Bob de Jong	Rintje Ritsma

== Sports ==
=== Olympic Program ===
The 1998 Winter Olympics featured a record 68 medal events over 14 disciplines in seven sports. In relation to the 1994 Winter Olympics, seven new events were added to the Winter Olympic program. Officially absent since the 1924 Winter Olympics, curling returned to the Olympic program (the sport was demonstrated in 1932,1988 and 1992) with 2 events (one tournament for men and one for women). For the first time, an ice hockey tournament for women was included. Another change was the addition of another discipline in alpine skiing: snowboarding with 4 events.

=== Biathlon ===
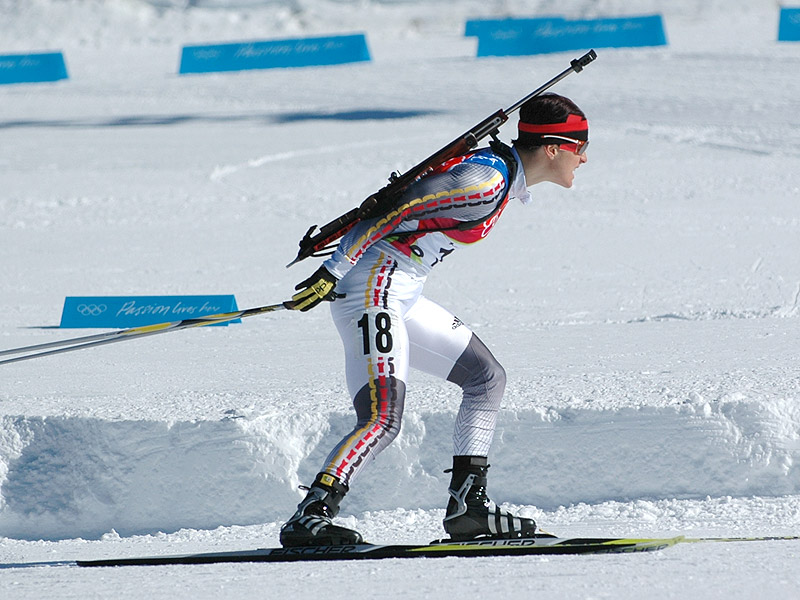
Uschi Disl of Germany, won one gold, one silver, and one bronze in the biathlon.

The biathlon competitions took place at Nozawa Onsen Snow Resort, north of Nagano City. The six events were the sprint, individual, and relay, for both men and women. In all, 183 athletes took part, including 96 men and 87 women from 32 countries. Norway and Germany each won five medals, with Uschi Disl from the latter country winning one gold, one silver, and one bronze.

The first event was the women's 15 km individual race that took place in falling snow on 9 February. The surprise gold medalist was Ekaterina Dafovska from Bulgaria, who had been ranked 51st at the previous Biathlon World Cup. Her gold medal was the first-ever Bulgarian gold medal at a Winter Olympics. Her time was 54:52.0, with only one target missed. Olena Petrova from Ukraine won the silver, 17.8 seconds behind, and Uschi Disl won the bronze, 25.9 seconds behind Dafovska.

The first men's event, the 20 km individual race, took place on 11 February. The Norwegian Halvard Hanevold missed his second-last target, but finished first in a time of 56:16.4. The Italian Pieralberto Carrara, who missed no targets, target, won the silver, 5.05 seconds behind. The Belarusian Alexei Aidarov was 30.1 seconds behind the Norwegian, and won the bronze.

=== Bobsleigh ===
The bobsleigh competitions took place at the Spiral, in Iizuna, just north of Nagano City. The Spiral course measured 1700 m in length, with fifteen curves, descended 113 m from start to finish, and included two short uphill sections. The two events were the two-man and four-man, for men only. Female competitors would begin competing in the two woman events at the subsequent Winter Olympics, the 2002 Winter Olympics in Salt Lake City.

In all, 156 athletes took part from 28 countries. The bobsleigh events resulted in two ties, for the two-man gold and for the four-man bronze. This was the first time in Olympic bobsleigh history that there were ties for the medal positions. Christoph Langen and Markus Zimmermann won bronze in the two-man competition and were part of the winning four-man team. In all, Germany win one gold and one bronze; Italy and Canada also won one gold each when the two-man team. Six team in all won medals. The first time since the 1968 Winter Olympics did more than four countries win bobsleigh medals. In addition, Germany and Switzerland were the only two countries to place two sleds in the top ten of either event.

The 1996 and 1997 Bobsleigh World Champions were teams from Germany and Italy respectively. However, Günther Huber and Antonio Tartaglia from Italy tied with the two-man team from Canada, Pierre Lueders and Dave MacEachern for the gold medal, each with combined times of 3:37.24. No silver medal was awarded. The German team of Christoph Langen and Markus Zimmermann were 0.65 seconds behind, and were awarded the bronze.

In the four-man event, bad weather restricted the competition to three runs only. The German team of Christoph Langen, Markus Zimmermann, Marco Jakobs and Olaf Hampel completed the three runs in 2:39.41 for the gold medal. The Swiss team of Marcel Rohner, Markus Nüssli, Markus Wasser, and Beat Seitz finished second with a time of 2:40.01. Two teams, were awarded bronze medals after completing the three runs in 2:40.06. These were the team from Great Britain, made up of Sean Olsson, Dean Ward, Courtney Rumbolt, and Paul Attwood; and the team from France, composed of Bruno Mingeon, Emmanuel Hostache, Éric Le Chanony, and Max Robert.

=== Curling ===
Curling was included in the program for the Nagano Olympics in 1993 following discussions that had begun in 1992. At the time, it was considered that curling was making its official Olympic debut following its appearance as a demonstration sport at the 1932, 1988, and 1992. At the Games in Nagano, both the men's and the women's curling tournament took place at Kazakoshi Park Arena in Karuizawa, Nagano, 30 minutes by bullet train (shinkansen) south of Nagano City. Eight teams played a total of seven games in the round robin in both tournaments, with the four best teams going to the semifinals. Canada won gold in the women's competition and silver in the men's; Switzerland won the gold in the men's tournament.

In the men's tournament, the Mike Harris team from Canada easily completed the round-robin tournament winning six of its seven games, only losing to the Eigil Ramsfjell team from Norway. In the semi-finals, the Canadian team defeated Tim Somerville's team from the United States by a score of 7–1; and in the other semi-final, the team from Switzerland led by Patrick Hürlimann defeated Norway 8–7. In the gold medal game, Switzerland shocked Canada by winning 9–3. In the bronze medal game, Eigil Ramsfjell's team from Norway defeated Tim Somerville's USA team by a score of 9–4.

In the women's tournament, the Sandra Schmirler team from Canada and the Elisabet Gustafson team from Sweden easily completed the round-robin tournament, with both teams winning six of their seven games. Canada only lost to the Dordi Nordby team from Norway, and Sweden's only loss was to Canada. In the semi-finals, the Canadian team defeated the team led by Kirsty Hay representing team Great Britain by a score of 6–5; and in the other semi-final, the team from Denmark led by Helena Blach Lavrsen defeated Sweden 7–5. In the gold medal game, Canada defeated Denmark by a score of 7–5. In the bronze medal game, Elisabet Gustafso's team from Sweden defeated Kirsty Hay's GB team by a score of 10–6.

=== Ice hockey ===
The ice hockey matches took place at two purpose-built arenas in Nagano City, Big Hat and Aqua Wing Arena. The ice hockey events were significant for two reasons: the first Olympic ice hockey tournament for women and the participation of players from the NHL, which scheduled its first ever mid-season break. The Czech Republic defeated Russia in the gold medal game for the men's title, and the United States defeated Canada in the gold medal game for the women's title.

The men's competition began on 7 February with eight teams playing in two groups of four, Group A and B, with each team playing three games. The winners of these two groups, Kazakhstan and Belarus, advanced to join Groups C and D, composed of the six highest ranked men's national ice hockey teams in the world. Russia, Czech Republic, and Finland were joined by Kazakhstan in Group C; Canada, Sweden, and the United States were joined by Belarus in Group D. On 22 February, with 10,010 spectators in attendance at Big Hat, the Czech Republic defeated Russia in the gold medal game, 1–0, with the lone goal of the match scored with 12 minutes remaining. Finland defeated Canada for the bronze medal by a score of 3–2.

The first women's ice hockey world championship, a biennial tournament, took place in 1990. Discussions to include women's ice hockey at the 1998 games began in 1992, and it was decided to include them in the program in 1993. The tournament included six teams playing in a one-group round-robin tournament. The top two team advanced to the gold medal game, and the teams ranked third and fourth played in the bronze medal match. The favorites were the Canadians, who had won the three previous world championships, with the Americans finishing second each time. In the round-robin tournament, the Americans finished first, with the Canadians second. In the last round-robin game, the United States handily defeated Canada, 7–4, with the two teams scoring nine goals in the third period. In the gold medal match, with 8,626 fans in attendance at Big Hat, the U.S. again defeated Canada, 3–1. Team Finland defeated Team China 4–1 for the bronze medal.

=== Luge ===
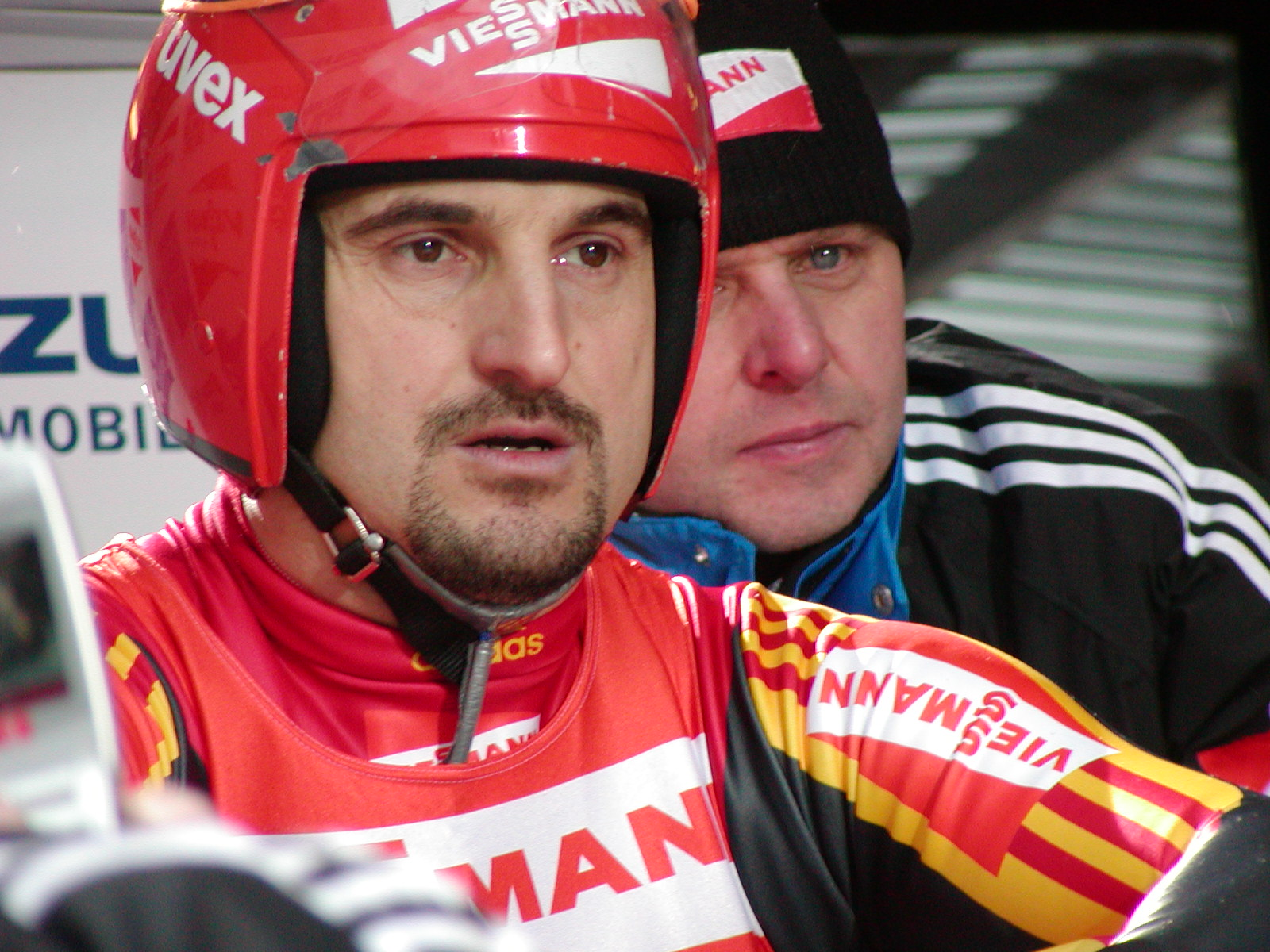
Georg Hackl, seen here during competition at Oberhof, Germany in 2005, won gold in the men's singles luge competition.

The luge competitions took place in Iizuna, Nagano, at the Spiral (Nagano Bobsleigh-Luge Park), the first purpose-built permanent bobsleigh, luge, and skeleton track in Asia. In all, 24 nations took part in the luge events, with four countries, India, South Korea, New Zealand, and Venezuela making their Olympic debut in luge events. There were three events, men's single, women's single, and doubles. Germany won all three gold medals, one silver, and one bronze. The United States won one silver and one bronze. Italy and Austria rounded out the medal table.

The first event with 24 lugers was the men's singles. Each athlete completed four runs over two days, 8 and 9 February. The German athlete, Georg Hackl, who had won gold at the 1992 Winter Olympics and 1994 Winter Olympics, had entered the competition winless in the 1997–1998 season. Hackl raced in a newly designed luge and aerodynamic shoes. Several team protested but these protests were rejected. Hackl dominated all four races, and finished with a time of 3:18.436, half a second ahead of the Italian Armin Zöggeler. Zöggeler finished .154 seconds ahead of Jens Müller of Germany, who had won gold at the 1988 Winter Olympics when he competed for East Germany.

On 10 and 11 February, the women's singles event took place, with each athlete completing four runs. In all, 29 athletes took part. The race for gold was very tight between two German athletes, Silke Kraushaar and Barbara Niedernhuber, with Kraushaar winning by .002 seconds, with a total time of 3:23.779 – the smallest margin of victory ever at the Olympics. Angelika Neuner of Austria won the bronze, 0.474 seconds behind the gold medalist.

The two-race doubles competition, which in theory were open to females, consisted of 17 male pairs. The event took place 13 February. The Germans Stefan Krauße and Jan Behrendt, who had competed together for 14 years, won the gold medal with a time of 1:41.105. Two American teams won silver and bronze, with Chris Thorpe and Gordy Sheer finishing .022 seconds behind the gold medalists and Brian Martin and Mark Grimmette a further .09 seconds behind. The win by Krauße and Behrendt was their four medal at the Olympics since they won silver at the 1988 Winter Olympics when they competed for East Germany. This was the first time since the introduction of luge at the 1964 Winter Olympics that athletes other than those from Austria, Germany, Italy, and the Soviet Union won medals.

=== Skating ===
==== Figure skating ====
The figure skating events took place at the White Ring (arena), an indoor arena built for the Games in Nagano City. Medals were awarded in four events: men's and women's singles, pair skating, and ice dance. The pairs event took place from 8–10 February, followed by the men's singles from 12 to 14 February, the ice dance from 13 to 16 February, and the women's singles from 18 to 20 February. The exhibition gala took place on 21 February. Russia won five medals, including three gold and two silver. The USA won one gold and one silver. France won two bronze medals. Canada won one silver, with China and Germany each winning one bronze. American figure skater Tara Lipinski became the youngest competitor in Winter Olympics history to earn a gold medal in an individual event.

==== Short track speed skating ====
Six short track speed skating events took place at the White Ring (arena) from 17 to 21 February. A total of 18 nations were representing among the skaters. Four countries won medals. South Korea won six medals, including three gold. Canada won four medals, including two gold. Host Japan won one gold and one silver; and China won five silver and one bronze medal.

The 14th ranked Japanese skater Takafumi Nishitani beat the Olympic record in the 500m semi-finals. In the final, he led from the start and won the gold medal with a time of 42.862 seconds. The Canadian Marc Gagnon, who was in second place, fell with two laps remaining. The Chinese skater An Yulong won the silver with a time of 43.022, 0.5 seconds of the Japanese skater Hitoshi Uematsu. In the 1000 meters, world record holder Marc Gagnon was disqualified for obstruction in the quarter-finals. The Chinese skater Li Jiajun, who led for most of the final, was passed by the South Korean skater, Kim Dong-sung, in the final corner. Kim won with a time of 1:32.375, 0.053 seconds ahead of the silver medalist. The Canadian Éric Bédard won the bronze, .223 seconds further behind. In the 5000m relays, world-title holders from Italy led at the beginning of the relay but were passed by the Canadians, and fell. With about one-quarter of the race left, a Chinese skater fell, bringing down with him a South Korean skater, allowing the Canadians to easily win the gold, with a time of 7:06.075. The South Koreans were .701 seconds behind, with the Chinese finishing with the bronze a further 4 seconds back. The Japanese team won the B-Final with a time that was five seconds faster than the gold medalists.

In the women's 500m final, the Canadian Isabelle Charest collided with the Chinese Wang Chunlu, and both fell. Charest was disqualified and Wang, angry, never finished the race. The Canadian Annie Perreault won the gold with a time of 46.568 seconds, 0.059 seconds ahead of Yang Yang (S) of China. Because these were the only two to finish the race, the bronze medal went to the winner of the B-Final, the South Korean Chun Lee-kyung. In the 1000m race, the Chinese skater Yang Yang (A) led the race but was passed by the 500m bronze medalist, Chun, in the last straight away to the finish line. Chun won the race with a time of 1:42.776 seconds. Yang Yang (A) was disqualified for using her elbow to try to block Chun. Yang Yang (S) won the silver, 0.567 seconds behind the gold medalist from South Korea. Won Hye-kyung, also of South Korea, won the bronze a further 0.18 seconds behind. In the 3000m relay, the Chinese team led for most of the race but the South Korean skater Kim Yun-mi passed Yang Yang (A) in the last changeover. Both teams beat the World Record, with the South Koreans finishing with a time of 4:16.260, and the Chinese were 0.123 seconds behind. The Canadian team won bronze with a time of 4:21.205.

==== Speed skating ====
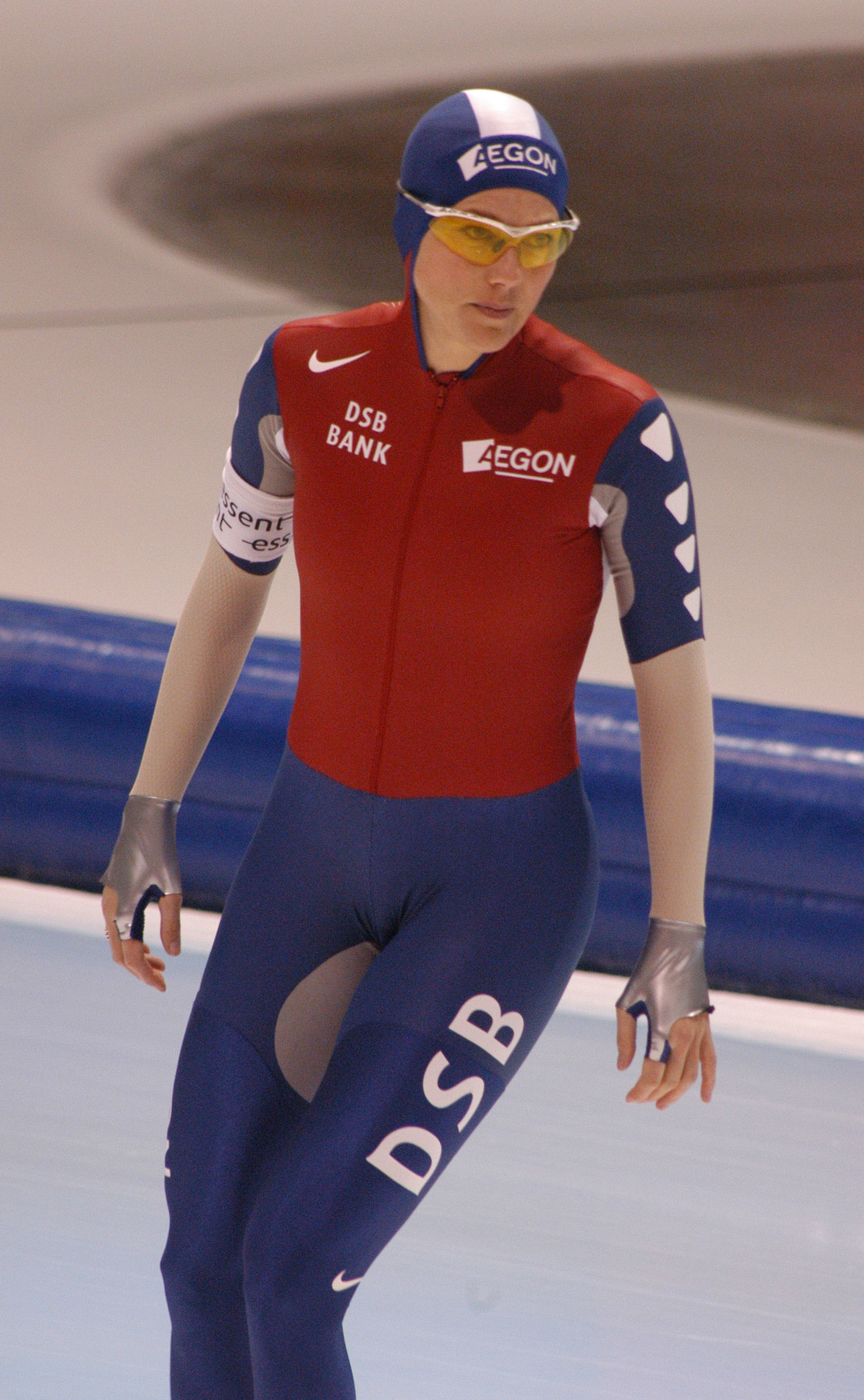
Marianne Timmer won two gold medals for the Netherlands in speed skating.

From 8–20 February 171 athletes from 25 countries took part in the long-track speed skating events that were held in Nagano City at M-Wave, Japan's first indoor, long-track speed skating venue. In all, eight countries won medals. The Netherlands won 11 medals, including five gold and four silver. Canada, host Japan, and the USA also won multiple medals. Twelve Olympic records and five World records were established at the Games on the ice at M-Wave. Gianni Romme and Marianne Timmer, both of the Netherlands, each won two gold medals. The Nagano Olympics were the first where athletes wore clap skates.

On the men's side, the world record holder in the men's 500m was the Japanese skater Hiroyasu Shimizu. Shimizu was the smallest skater at the Games, 1.62m tall. The 500m was run over two races for the first time at these Games. Shimizu was fastest in both races becoming only the second ever Japanese to win a singles title at the Olympic Games. Finishing in second and third were the Canadian skaters, Jeremy Wotherspoon and Kevin Overland, who are 1.91m and 1.84 m tall, respectively. Shimizu's combined time was 1:11.35, 0.49 seconds ahead of Wotherspoon, and another 0.02 seconds ahead of Overland. The 1500m was won by Norwegian Ådne Søndrål with a world record time of 1:47.87. Søndrål was 0.26 and 0.65 seconds ahead of two Dutch skaters, Ids Postma, and Rintje Ritsma. In the 1000m, Postma won gold, with a time of 1:10.64, followed by another Dutch skater Jan Bos, who was 0.07 seconds behind, and Shimizu who won the bronze with a time of 1:11.00. In the 5000m, the Dutch skater Gianni Romme won gold, with a world record time of 6:22.20, followed by Ritsma, who was 6.04 seconds behind, and Bart Veldkamp, representing Belgium who won the bronze with a time of 6:28.31. Finally, in the 10,000m, three Dutch skaters won medals. Romme won gold with a world record time, 15 seconds ahead of the world record, of 13:15.33, Bob de Jong won silver, and Ritsma won bronze.

On the women's side, the 500 m title was won by the Canadian Catriona Le May Doan, the favorite, who beat or equalled the world record four times before the Games. Her teammate, Susan Auch, finished second. Both were coached by Susan's brother, Derrick Auch. Tomomi Okazaki, of host Japan, won the bronze medal. In the 1500m, Dutch skater Marianne Timmer won gold with a world record time of 1:57.58. The German skater Gunda Niemann was second, 1.08 seconds behind, and the American skater Chris Witty won bronze with a time of 1:58.97. In the 1000m, Timmer won gold again, with a time of 1:16.51. Witty won silver, 0.26 seconds behind, and Le May Doan won bronze with a time of 1:17.37. The German skater Franziska Schenk, one of the favorites, fell during the second lap. In the 3000m, German skaters won all three medals. Niemann won gold with a time of 4:07.29; Claudia Pechstein won silver, 1.18 seconds back; and Anni Friesinger won bronze with a time of 4:09.44. Finally, in the 5000m, Pechstein won gold with a world record time of 6:59.61; Niemann was 0.04 seconds back for silver, and the Kazakh skater Lyudmila Prokasheva won bronze, with a time of 7:11.14. Prokasheva's medal was the first medal by a female Kazakh athlete at any Winter Olympics.

=== Skiing ===
==== Alpine skiing ====
The Alpine skiing events took place at Hakuba Happoone Winter Resort in Hakuba village, 50 kilometers west of Nagano City, and at Mount Higashidate in the Shiga Highlands in Yamanouchi, Nagano, 30 kilometers northeast of Nagano City. In all, 249 athletes, 141 males and 108 females, from 49 countries, took part in the 10 Alpine skiing events, men's and women's downhill, super-G, giant slalom, slalom, and combined. Austria won 11 medals, including three gold. Germany also won three gold, and six medals in total. Seven other countries also won medals, including Australia, whose Zali Steggall won that countries first ever individual Winter Olympics medal. The most successful athletes at these Games were Katja Seizinger from Germany, who won two gold medals and one bronze; and Hermann Maier, from Austria, who won two gold medals.

==== Cross-country skiing ====
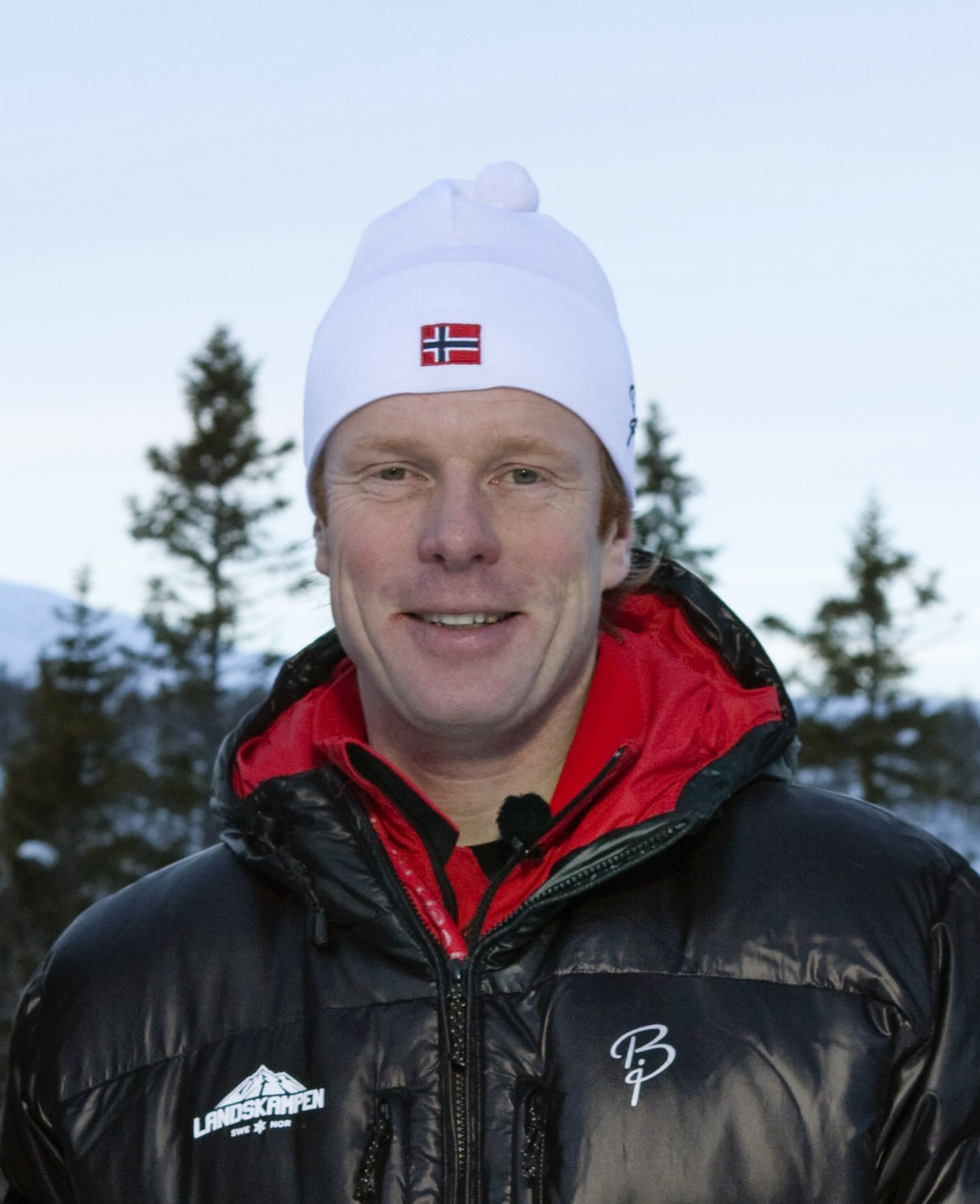
Bjørn Dæhlie, pictured in January 2011

The cross-country skiing events took place at Nozawa Onsen Ski Resort, in the town of Nozawaonsen, approximately 50 kilometers north of Nagano. In all, 228 athletes, including 126 men and 102 women, from 37 countries took part. Russia won eight medals, including all the women five gold medals, and Norway won nine medals, including four gold medals. Six other countries also won medals, including Finland with one gold and two bronze, and Italy with two silver and two bronze. Larisa Lazutina from Russia won five medals, including three gold; and Bjørn Dæhlie from Norway won four medals, including three gold.

==== Freestyle skiing ====
The freestyle skiing competition was held at the Iizuna Kogen Ski Area, 12 kilometers north of Nagano, from 8 to 18 February. It was the third consecutive Games that freestyle skiing events took place. The four events, men's and women's moguls and aerials, involved 110 athletes from 25 countries . The United States won three gold medals. Host Japan won one gold medal. Athletes from Finland won a silver and a bronze medal. Six other countries took home either one silver or one bronze medal.

In men's moguls, the American Jonny Moseley was first after the qualifications. Two cousins from Finland, Janne Lahtela and Sami Mustonen, who had never medalled at the FIS Freestyle Ski World Cup, were ranked second and third behind Moseley. Moseley easily won the final with a score of 26.93. Lahtela was .93 points behind, and Mustonen was another .24 points behind. The Canadian, Jean-Luc Brassard, gold medalist from the 1994 Winter Olympics, finished in fourth. In men's aerials, the American Eric Bergoust, who had fallen during training, overtook the other competitors with a score of 255.64 points. The Frenchmen, Sébastien Foucras, and the Belarusian, Dmitri Dashinski, were second and third. The Canadian, Nicolas Fontaine, world champion in 1997, only managed 10th place after falling on his second jump.

The Japanese moguls skier, Tae Satoya, 11th after qualifications, surprised everyone by winning the gold medal with a score of 25.06. She was the first female Japanese Olympic champion. The German, Tatjana Mittermayer scored 24.62 points and won the silver medal. The Norwegian, Kari Traa, won the bronze with a score of 24.09 points. In women's aerials, American Nikki Stone won the gold medal with a score of 193.00 points. The ex-gymnast, Xu Nannan from China won silver with a score of 186.97, and Colette Brand from Switzerland won bronze with a score of 171.83.

==== Nordic combined skiing ====
The Nordic combined events were held at the Hakuba Ski Jumping Stadium and the Snow Harp, both in Hakuba village, 50 kilometers west of Nagano City. In all, 53 athletes from 14 countries, took part in the two events, individual and team. Norway won both gold medals. Finland won both silver medals. France and Russia each won one of the bronze medals.

The first event was the individual competition that took place on 13 and 14 February. In all, there were 48 athletes. The silver medalist from the 1994 Winter Olympics, the Norwegian Bjarte Engen Vik, was the 1997–98 FIS Nordic Combined World Cup leader. At the Hakuba Ski Jumping Stadium, Vik led after the first two jumps. He was followed by the Russian Valeri Stoliarov. The following day, the skiers left, in order of the placement following the ski jump, along te 15 kilometer cross-country race at the Snow Harp. The race was skied in the rain. Vik led throughout and finished with a 27.5 second lead over second place. With three kilometers to the finish line, the Finnish athlete, 18-year-old Samppa Lajunen, who was sixth after the jumps, caught up with Stoliarov. The skied together until the stadium, and 60 meters from the finish line, Lajunen passed the Russian and picked up the silver medal 0.7 seconds ahead of Stoliarov who won the bronze. The fastest athlete on the course was the Swiss skier, Marco Zarucchi, who was 43rd after the jumps, finished in 25th place.

Eleven nations took part in the team event on 19 and 20 February. At previous Olympics, the team event involved three athletes per team, with the completing a 3x10 kilometer relay. At Nagano, the team was enlarged to four athletes who completed a 4x5 kilometer relay. After the jumps, the team from Finland led by four seconds ahead of the Austrians, eight seconds ahead of the Norwegians, nine ahead of the Czechs, and 29 seconds ahead of the Japanese. The relay took place in rain. The Norwegians quickly took the lead and never looked back. The last Norwegian skier had the time to grab his country's flag with 500 meters from the finish line, and they won gold with more than one minute lead over the team from Finland. The French team, sixth after the jumps, won the bronze medal ahead of the Austrians. The Japanese, gold medalists at the 1992 Winter Olympics and 1994 Winter Olympics finished in fifth.

==== Ski jumping ====
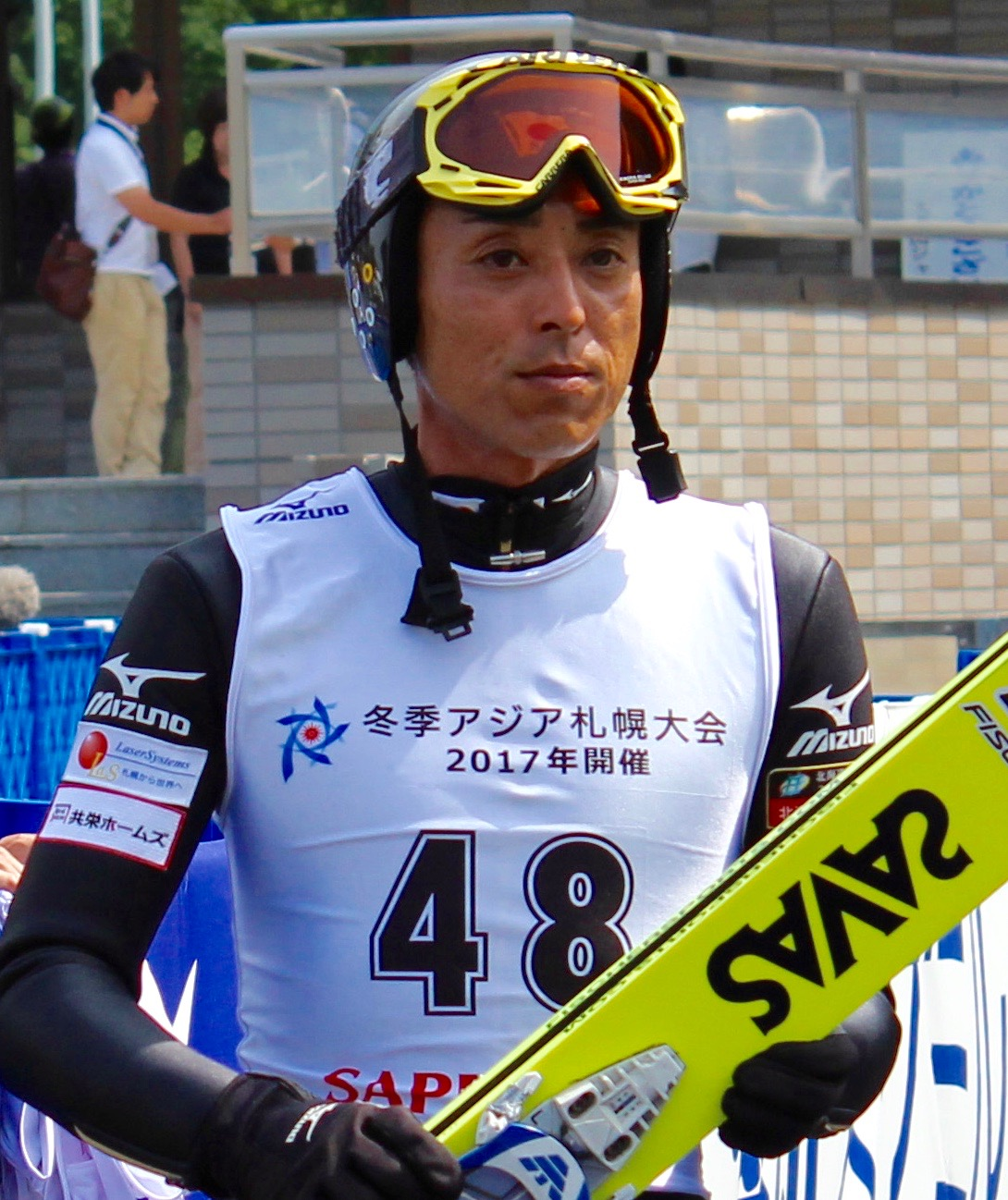
Kazuyoshi Funaki (pictured in 2014) won two gold medals and one silver for host Japan.

The ski jumping competitions took place at the Hakuba Ski Jumping Stadium in Hakuba village, 50 kilometers west of Nagano City. In all, 68 athletes from 19 countries participated. For the first time, the top 30 jumpers qualified for the second round. Host Japan won the most medals, including two gold in the large hill and large hill team. Finland, Germany, and Austria rounded out the medal table. Kazuyoshi Funaki from Yoichi, Hokkaido in Japan won two gold and one silver for the host country.

The normal hill jumps took place on 11 February in front of 45,000 spectators. The Japanese, who had dominated the 1997–98 FIS Ski Jumping World Cup season, were the favorites. With a jump of 91.5 meters, Masahiko Harada led after the first round ahead of the Finnish jumper, Jani Soininen Kazuyoshi Funaki, who was fourth after the first round, took the lead with a jump of 90.5 meters in the second round. After a delay caused by strong wind, Soininen took the lead with only Harada still to jump. A sidewind blew when Harada jumped, and only managed 84.5 meters to finish in fifth place overall. Soininen won gold with 234.5 points, Funaki was second with 233.5, and the Austrian Andreas Widhölzl finished third with 232.5 points.

On 15 February, the large hill jump competition took place. 60,000 spectators gathered at Hakuba Ski Jumping Stadium. Normal hill bronze medalist Widhölzl led after the first round, ahead of the Japanese jumper Takanobu Okabe, Jani Soininen et Funaki. In the second round, Funaki jumped 132.5 m, and, for the first time at the Olympics, received perfect points for his style. He jumped into first place and won the gold medal with 272.3 points overall. It was the first Japanese gold medal in ski jumping since the 1972 Winter Olympics in Sapporo. Harada jumped next. Unfortunately, the measurement system was installed between 95 and 135 meters and his jump was beyond that. He was measured manually to be 136 meters. He also had good points but only managed to win the bronze medal with 258.3. meters. Soininen won the silver with a combined score of 260.8 points.

At the 1994 Winter Olympics, the Japanese team were the favorites but Harada jumped poorly, costing the Japanese the gold medal. Again, in 1998, the Japanese were the favorites. The team event took place on 17 February. The start was slowed by 30 minutes because of heavy falling snow. The first two Japanese jumpers, Okabe at Hiroya Saitō, jumped Japan into first place. Harada completely missed his jump, jumping only 79.5 meters, and despite Funaki having a good jump, Japan drop from first to fourth after the first round behind Austria, Germany, and Norway. Okabe jumped 137 meters, which was an Olympic record. Saitō followed this with a good jump. Harada was next, and like Okabe, jumped 137 meters. The last jumper was Funaki who jumped 125 meters, and the Japanese team became Olympic champions with 933.0 points. The Germans won silver with 897.4 points, and the Austrians finished with 881.5 points for the bronze.

==== Snowboarding ====
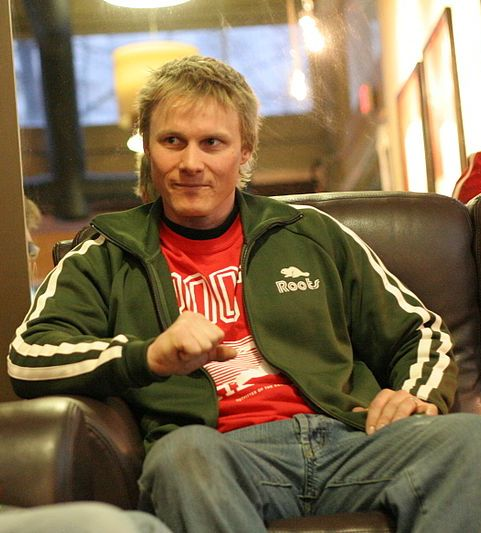
Ross Rebagliati (pictured in 2007) won the first-ever gold medal in men's giant slalom, before being disqualified, and then having his medal reinstated.

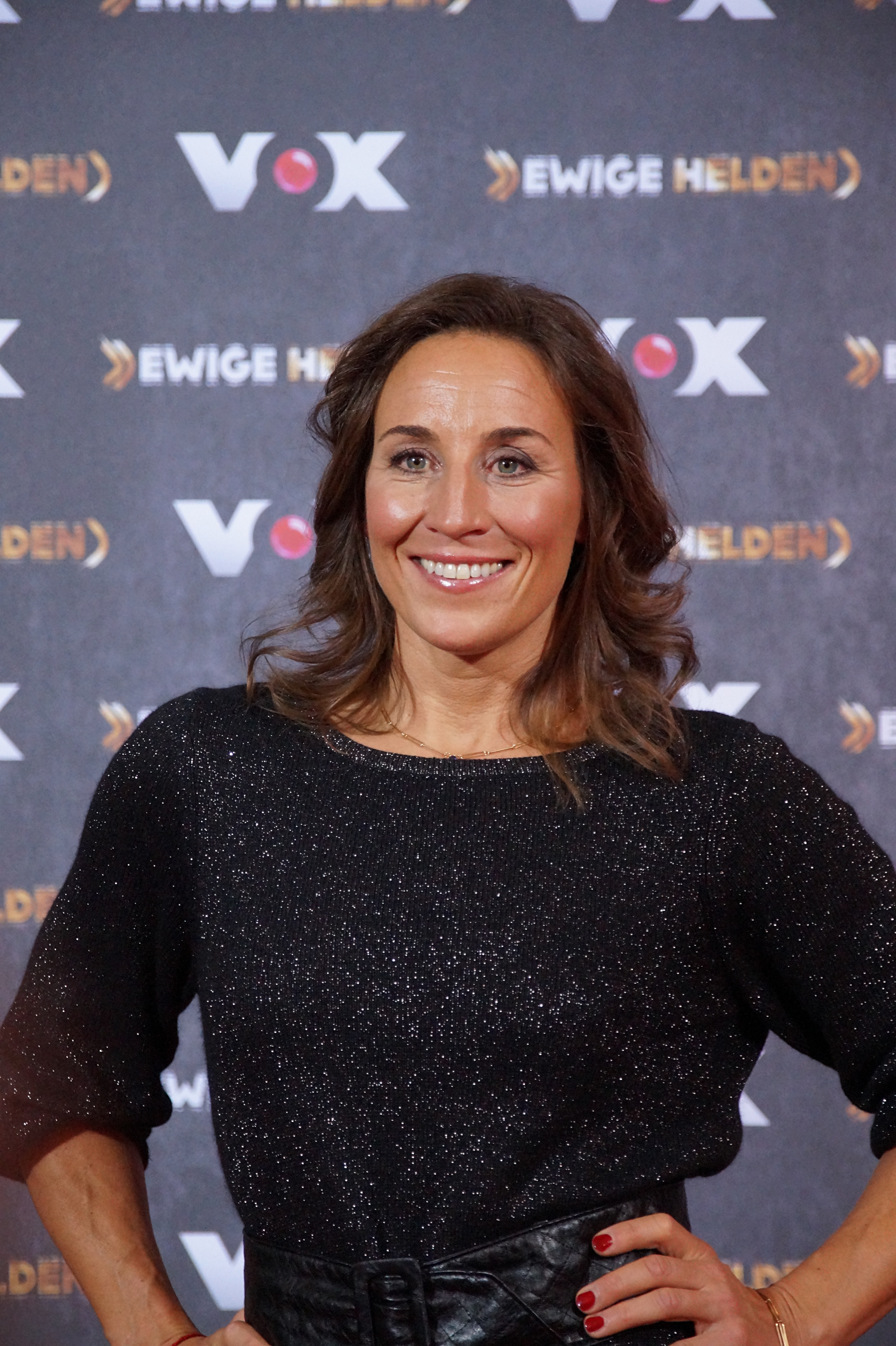
Nicola Thost (pictured in 2015) won the gold medal in women's halfpipe.

In the decade leading up the games, snowboarding had become popular in both North America and Europe, as well as Japan, and as a result, in August 1994, the NAOC received a request from the IOC president Samaranch to consider including snowboarding at the 1998 Winter Olympics. To reduce costs, NAOC asked the host community to cover a portion of the costs – the town Yamanouchi agreed – and FIS was expected to support financially as well. In November 1995, the NAOC executive board agreed to add snowboarding, and this was approved by the IOC at their December meeting the following month in Karuizawa. This was the first Winter Olympics with snowboarding events. The events took place at Mount Yakebitai and Kanbayashi Snowboard Park in Yamanouchi, Nagano, 30 kilometers northeast of Nagano City, from 8 to 12 February. In all, 125 athletes from 22 countries participated in the men's and women's halfpipe and giant slalom. Athletes from Germany won two medals, including one gold. Athletes from Switzerland, France, and Canada also won gold medals.

In the men's giant slalom, the Canadian Jasey-Jay Anderson won the first race with a half-second lead ahead of Rebagliati. During the second race, the event was temporary delayed because of snow and fog. Ross Rebagliati finished with a combined time of 2:03.96, 0.02 seconds ahead of the Italian Thomas Prugger, and another 0.10 seconds ahead of the Swiss Ueli Kestenholz. Controversy occurred when three days after the men's giant slalom, the International Olympic Committee determined that gold medalist Rebagliati from Canada, was disqualified after testing positive for marijuana. It was the first time in Olympic history that an athlete was disqualified for marijuana. The Canadian Olympic Committee lodged a protest and the case quickly went to the Court of Arbitration for Sport where it was ruled that because marijuana was not classified as a "banned" substance, the medal should be returned to the Canadian athlete. In the halfpipe, the gold medal went to the Swiss Gian Simmen, who had the highest score, 85.2, despite a heavy rain. The Norwegian Daniel Franck won the silver with a score of 82.4, and the American Ross Powers won the bronze with a score of 82.1.

The women's giant slalom was delayed one day because of a snowstorm. The big favorite, the Frenchwoman Karine Ruby won the first race with almost two seconds ahead of her compatriot Isabelle Blanc. Ruby won the second race, with Blanc missing the last gate and falling. Ruby's combined time was 2:17.34. The German Heidi Renoth won the silver with a time of 2:19.17, and the Austrian Brigitte Köck won the bronze with a time of 2:19.42. In the halfpipe, the Norwegian Stine Brun Kjeldaas won the qualification round. However, in the finals, the German Nicola Thost, a former gymnast, finished second in both legs, scored 74.6 points, which was enough for the gold medal. Stine Brun Kjeldaas finished fourth in the first leg and first in second, winning the silver with 74.2 points. The American Shannon Dunn-Downing won the first leg, but finished seventh in the second leg, leaving her with the bronze with a score of 72.8.

== Mascots ==
The mascots of the 1998 Winter Olympics are four owls named Sukki, Nokki, Lekki and Tsukki, also known as the Snowlets.

== Media ==
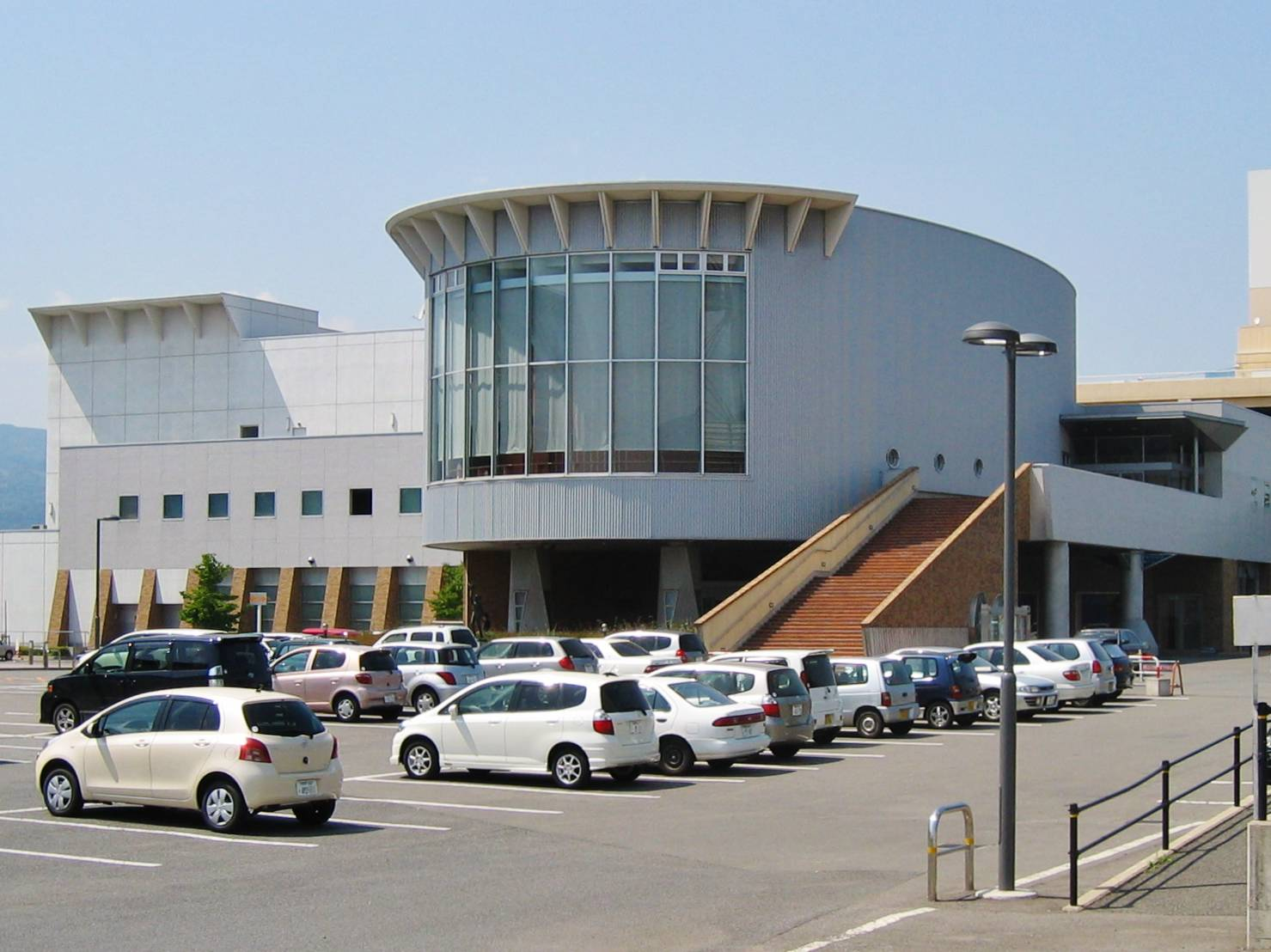
Wakasato Civic Cultural Center in June 2006

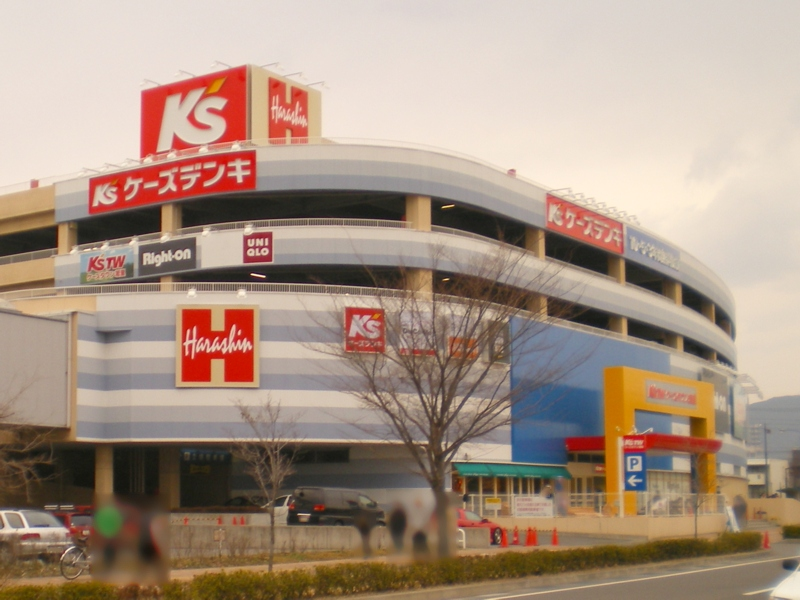
The former IBC was converted into a department store

The Nagano Olympics were covered by more than 10,000 members of the media, including 8,329 accredited journalists, of which 2,586 were from newspaper media and 5,743 television and radio journalists. The Organizing Committee established a Main Press Center (MPC), over two buildings, and 17 annexes throughout the different sites. The International Broadcast Centre (IBC) was a temporary one-storey facility constructed on the grounds of a former textile mill in the immediate vicinity of the MPC and Big Hat. (Note: Hanazawa 1999a, p. 185) A wide range of general services, such as a restaurants, cafeterias, banks, post offices and a medical clinics were available at the IBC. (Note: Hanazawa 1999a, p. 186) The IBC was later converted into a departament store, K's Town Wakasato Store.

The MBC, which is today the Wakasato Civic Cultural Center, was built beside Big Hat, the main ice hockey venue. The MBC had a surface area of 42,728 m^{2}, with one principal room for 600 journalists of 1430m^{2} and another of 5100m^{2} that was rented by various press agencies. (Note: Hanazawa 1999a, p. 174) The largest press offices at the Games were Kyodo News, Associated Press, Agence France-Presse, Reuters, and Deutsche Presse-Agentur. (Note: Hanazawa 1999a, p. 171) The MBC also included a press conference room for 600 people. (Note: Hanazawa 1999a, p. 166)

The host broadcaster for the Games, the Olympic Radio and Televisions Organization (ORTO'98) was established as a separate organization within NAOC, the organizing committee. (Note: Hanazawa 1999a, p. 188) ORTO'98 was joint-venture created between NHK, the Japanese public broadcaster, the National Association of Broadcasters (NAB), and NAOC. (Note: Hanazawa 1999a, p. 188) A total of 1647 staff worked 386 cameras at the various venues and events, (Note: Hanazawa 1999a, p. 190) with coverage increasing by 55% over the 1994 Winter Olympics in Lillehammer. (Note: Hanazawa 1999a, p. 188) The Games were broadcast in 160 countries, 40 more than in Lillehammer, (Note: Hanazawa 1999a, p. 188) and it was estimated that 10.7 billion viewers watched the Games over the 16-day period. (Note: Hanazawa 1999a, p. 188) Some events were filmed and broadcast in analog high-definition television, with NHK broadcasting over 270 hours of coverage in Japan.

Broadcasting rights totaled US$513 million, which was a record for the Winter Olympics, and all contracts with 16 broadcasting rights' holders were record sums. This money was split 60–40 between NAOC and the International Olympic Committee. The American broadcasting network, CBS, paid 375 million US dollars, to air the Games in the United States. The 1998 Winter Olympics are the most recent Olympic Games to not air on NBC in the United States, as the current contract with NBC started in 1999.

=== Broadcasting rights ===
(Note: The ordering of broadcasters in this section follows the ordering in the Official Report of the 1998 Winter Olympic Games, Vol. 1: Planning and Support.)

- Asia – ABU, ATV
- Brazil - Rede Globo, Rede Manchete, Rede Bandeirantes and Sportv
- Australia – Network Ten
- Canada – CBC
- Europe – EBU
- Jamaica – CVM TV
- Japan – NOJC
- Malaysia – Astro
- New Zealand – TVNZ
- North Africa – URTNA
- South Africa – SABC
- South Korea – KBS
- South America – OTI
- Sub-Saharan Africa – Supersport
- United Kingdom – BBC
- United States – CBS, TNT

== See also ==
- 1998 Winter Olympics flu epidemic
- 1998 Winter Paralympics
- Olympic Games held in Japan
  - 1964 Summer Olympics – Tokyo
  - 1972 Winter Olympics – Sapporo
  - 1998 Winter Olympics – Nagano
  - 2020 Summer Olympics – Tokyo
- List of IOC country codes

== Notes ==
Winter Olympics
Preceded by Lillehammer	XVIII Olympic Winter Games; Nagano; 1998	Succeeded by Salt Lake City
