= List of ties for medals at the Olympics =

This article lists all ties for medals at the Olympics. A tie occurs when two or more individual or teams achieve identical results in the Olympics. In these cases, there are multiple winners awarded the same medal.

== Ties for medals at the Olympics ==
Ties occasionally occur during the games, and since medals are complicated to produce, the Olympic organising committee makes advance arrangements for extra medals to be produced in the event of a tie.

=== Number of ties for medals in Olympics history ===
'Total' shows the number of ties for medals in Olympics history, while 'Events' shows the number of events with at least one medal tie. There can be more than one tie for medals for one event as there can be ties for gold, silver, and bronze.

Games	Gold	Silver	Bronze	Events	Total
Summer Olympic Games	31	37	58	122	126
Winter Olympic Games	9	15	9	29	33

== List of ties at the Summer Olympics ==
Games	Sport	Event	Gold	Silver	Bronze	Ref.
1896 Athens	Athletics	Men's high jump	Ellery Clark; United States	James Connolly; United States Robert Garrett; United States	Not awarded as there was a tie for silver.	
1896 Athens	Athletics	Men's pole vault	William Hoyt; United States	Albert Tyler; United States	Evangelos Damaskos; Greece Ioannis Theodoropoulos; Greece	
1896 Athens	Athletics	Men's 100 metres	Thomas Burke; United States	Fritz Hofmann; Germany	Francis Lane; United States Alajos Szokolyi; Hungary	
1896 Athens	Fencing	Men's foil	Eugène-Henri Gravelotte; France	Henri Callot; France	Periklis Pierrakos-Mavromichalis; Greece Athanasios Vouros; Greece	
1900 Paris	Archery	Sur la Perche à la Herse	Emmanuel Foulon; Belgium	Auguste Serrurier; France Emile Druart; Belgium	Not awarded as there was a tie for silver.	
1900 Paris	Equestrian	High jump	Dominique Gardères; France Gian Giorgio Trissino; Italy	Not awarded as there was a tie for gold.	Georges Van Der Poele; Belgium	
1900 Paris	Rugby	Men's tournament	France national rugby union team Mixed team	Germany national rugby union team Germany Great Britain; Great Britain	Not awarded as there was a tie for silver.	
1900 Paris	Shooting	Men's 300 metre free rifle, three positions	Emil Kellenberger; Switzerland	Anders Peter Nielsen; Denmark	Paul van Asbroeck; Belgium Ole Østmo; Norway	
1900 Paris	Shooting	Men's 300 metre free rifle, kneeling	Konrad Stäheli; Switzerland	Emil Kellenberger; Switzerland Anders Peter Nielsen; Denmark	Not awarded as there was a tie for silver.	
1904 St. Louis	Boxing	Welterweight	Albert Young; United States	Harry Spanjer; United States	Jack Egan; United States Joseph Lydon; United States	(Note: Jack Egan originally won the silver medal in the lightweight competition and the bronze medal in the welterweight competition. Later, it was discovered that Egan's real name was Frank Joseph Floyd. AAU rules made it illegal to fight under an assumed name, and in November 1905, the AAU disqualified Egan from all AAU competitions and he had to return all of his prizes. In the lightweight competition Russell van Horn moved up to silver. However, according to the IOC's medal database for the 1904 Olympics, Egan has the silver medal in Boxing lightweight and the bronze medal in Boxing welterweight, van Horn has bronze in the lightweight competition and Joseph Lydon keeps his bronze in the welterweight competition.)
1904 St. Louis	Diving	Platform	George Sheldon; United States	Georg Hoffmann; Germany	Alfred Braunschweiger; Germany Frank Kehoe; United States	
1904 St. Louis	Golf	Men's individual	George Lyon; Canada	Chandler Egan; United States	Burt McKinnie; United States Francis Newton; United States	
1904 St. Louis	Gymnastics	Men's vault	George Eyser; United States Anton Heida; United States	Not awarded as there was a tie for gold.	William Merz; United States	
1904 St. Louis	Gymnastics	Men's horizontal bar	Anton Heida; United States Edward Hennig; United States	Not awarded as there was a tie for gold.	George Eyser; United States	
1908 London	Athletics	Men's standing high jump	Ray Ewry; United States	John Biller; United States Konstantinos Tsiklitiras; Greece	Not awarded as there was a tie for silver.	
1908 London	Athletics	Men's pole vault	Edward Cook; United States Alfred Gilbert; United States	Not awarded as there was a tie for gold.	Edward Archibald; Canada Clare Jacobs; United States Bruno Söderström; Sweden	
1908 London	Athletics	Men's high jump	Harry Porter; United States	Géo André; France Con Leahy; Great Britain István Somodi; Hungary	Not awarded as there was a tie for silver.	
1908 London	Diving	Men's 3 metre springboard	Albert Zürner; Germany	Kurt Behrens; Germany	George Gaidzik; United States Gottlob Walz; Germany	
1908 London	Hockey	Men's tournament	England; Great Britain	Ireland; Great Britain	Scotland; Great Britain Wales; Great Britain	
1908 London	Polo	Men's tournament	Roehampton; Great Britain	Hurlingham Club; Great Britain Ireland; Great Britain	Not awarded as there was a tie for silver.	
1908 London	Rackets	Men's singles	Evan Noel; Great Britain	Henry Leaf; Great Britain	John Jacob Astor; Great Britain Henry Brougham; Great Britain	
1908 London	Shooting	Men's trap	Walter Ewing; Canada	George Beattie; Canada	Alexander Maunder; Great Britain Anastasios Metaxas; Greece	(Note: Anastasios Metaxas is generally credited with a bronze medal; no tie-breaker was held. The 1908 official report lists Metaxas as having tied with Alexander Maunder and assigns bronze medals to each. However, Metaxas does not appear in the IOC medal database, which lists only Maunder as sole bronze medalist. Some sources follow the IOC's database.)
1912 Stockholm	Athletics	Men's pole vault	Harry Babcock; United States	Frank Nelson; United States Marc Wright; United States	William Halpenny; Canada Frank Murphy; United States Bertil Uggla; Sweden	
1912 Stockholm	Athletics	Men's pentathlon	Ferdinand Bie; Norway Jim Thorpe; United States	James Donahue; United States	Frank Lukeman; Canada	(Note: Jim Thorpe's gold medals were stripped by the International Olympic Committee in 1913, after the IOC learned that Thorpe had played semi-pro baseball prior to the 1912 games, violating Olympic amateurism rules. This moved everyone else up in the rankings. In 1982, the IOC was convinced that the disqualification had been improper, as no protest against Thorpe's eligibility had been brought within the required 30 days and reinstated Thorpe's medals. The three medalists promoted were not retroactively demoted, leaving co-champions in these events.)
1912 Stockholm	Athletics	Men's decathlon	Hugo Wieslander; Sweden Jim Thorpe; United States	Charles Lomberg; Sweden	Gösta Holmér; Sweden	
1912 Stockholm	Rowing	Men's coxed four	Germany	Great Britain	Denmark Norway	
1912 Stockholm	Rowing	Men's single sculls	Wally Kinnear; Great Britain	Polydore Veirman; Belgium	Everard Butler; Canada Mart Kuusik; Russian Empire	
1912 Stockholm	Wrestling	Men's Greco-Roman light heavyweight	Not awarded as the event was a draw.	Anders Ahlgren; Sweden Ivar Böhling; Finland	Béla Varga; Hungary	
1920 Antwerp	Wrestling	Men's freestyle heavyweight	Robert Roth; Switzerland	Nat Pendleton; United States	Fred Meyer; United States Ernst Nilsson; Sweden	
1924 Paris	Gymnastics	Men's rope climbing	Bedřich Šupčík; Czechoslovakia	Albert Séguin; France	Ladislav Vácha; Czechoslovakia August Güttinger; Switzerland	
1924 Paris	Gymnastics	Men's sidehorse vault	Albert Séguin; France	Jean Gounot; France François Gangloff; France	Not awarded as there was a tie for silver.	
1928 Amsterdam	Weightlifting	Men's 67.5 kg	Hans Haas; Austria Kurt Helbig; Germany	Not awarded as there was a tie for gold.	Fernand Arnout; France	
1936 Berlin	Gymnastics	Men's floor	Georges Miez; Switzerland	Josef Walter; Switzerland	Konrad Frey; Germany Eugen Mack; Switzerland	
1936 Berlin	Weightlifting	Men's 67.5 kg	Robert Fein; Austria Anwar Mesbah; Egypt	Not awarded as there was a tie for gold.	Karl Jansen; Germany	
1948 London	Gymnastics	Men's parallel bars	Michael Reusch; Switzerland	Veikko Huhtanen; Finland	Josef Stalder; Switzerland Christian Kipfer; Switzerland	
1948 London	Gymnastics	Men's pommel horse	Paavo Aaltonen; Finland Veikko Huhtanen; Finland Heikki Savolainen; Finland	Not awarded as there was a tie for gold.	Not awarded as there was a tie for gold.	
1948 London	Gymnastics	Men's vault	Paavo Aaltonen; Finland	Olavi Rove; Finland	János Mogyorósi-Klencs; Hungary Ferenc Pataki; Hungary Leo Sotornik; Czechoslovakia	
1952 Helsinki	Gymnastics	Men's floor	William Thoresson; Sweden	Jerzy Jokiel; Poland Tadao Uesako; Japan	Not awarded as there was a tie for silver.	
1952 Helsinki	Gymnastics	Men's horizontal bar	Jack Günthard; Switzerland	Josef Stalder; Switzerland Alfred Schwarzmann; Germany	Not awarded as there was a tie for silver.	
1952 Helsinki	Gymnastics	Men's pommel horse	Viktor Chukarin; Soviet Union	Hrant Shahinyan; Soviet Union Yevgeny Korolkov; Soviet Union	Not awarded as there was a tie for silver.	
1952 Helsinki	Gymnastics	Men's rings	Hrant Shahinyan; Soviet Union	Viktor Chukarin; Soviet Union	Dmytro Leonkin; Soviet Union Hans Eugster; Switzerland	
1952 Helsinki	Gymnastics	Men's vault	Viktor Chukarin; Soviet Union	Masao Takemoto; Japan	Takashi Ono; Japan Tadao Uesako; Japan	
1956 Melbourne	Athletics	Women's high jump	Mildred McDaniel; United States	Thelma Hopkins; Great Britain Mariya Pisareva; Soviet Union	Not awarded as there was a tie for silver.	
1956 Melbourne	Athletics	Men's 400 metres	Charles Jenkins; United States	Karl-Friedrich Haas; United Team of Germany	Voitto Hellstén; Finland Ardalion Ignatyev; Soviet Union	
1956 Melbourne	Gymnastics	Women's floor	Ágnes Keleti; Hungary Larisa Latynina; Soviet Union	Not awarded as there was a tie for gold.	Elena Leuşteanu; Romania	
1956 Melbourne	Gymnastics	Men's rings	Albert Azaryan; Soviet Union	Valentin Muratov; Soviet Union	Masao Takemoto; Japan Masumi Kubota; Japan	
1956 Melbourne	Gymnastics	Women's balance beam	Ágnes Keleti; Hungary	Eva Bosáková; Czechoslovakia Tamara Manina; Soviet Union	Not awarded as there was a tie for silver.	
1956 Melbourne	Gymnastics	Women's vault	Larisa Latynina; Soviet Union	Tamara Manina; Soviet Union	Olga Lemhényi-Tass; Hungary Ann-Sofi Pettersson; Sweden	
1956 Melbourne	Gymnastics	Men's floor	Valentin Muratov; Soviet Union	Nobuyuki Aihara; Japan William Thoresson; Sweden Viktor Chukarin; Soviet Union	Not awarded as there was a tie for silver.	
1956 Melbourne	Gymnastics	Men's vault	Helmut Bantz; United Team of Germany Valentin Muratov; Soviet Union	Not awarded as there was a tie for gold.	Yuri Titov; Soviet Union	
1956 Melbourne	Gymnastics	Men's parallel bars	Viktor Chukarin; Soviet Union	Masumi Kubota; Japan	Takashi Ono; Japan Masao Takemoto; Japan	
1956 Melbourne	Gymnastics	Women's team portable apparatus	Hungary	Sweden	Soviet Union Poland	
1960 Rome	Athletics	Women's high jump	Iolanda Balaş; Romania	Jarosława Jóźwiakowska; Poland Dorothy Shirley; Great Britain	Not awarded as there was a tie for silver.	
1960 Rome	Gymnastics	Men's pommel horse	Eugen Ekman; Finland Boris Shakhlin; Soviet Union	Not awarded as there was a tie for gold.	Shuji Tsurumi; Japan	
1960 Rome	Gymnastics	Men's rings	Albert Asaryan; Soviet Union	Boris Shakhlin; Soviet Union	Takashi Ono; Japan Velik Kapsazov; Bulgaria	
1960 Rome	Gymnastics	Men's vault	Boris Shakhlin; Soviet Union Takashi Ono; Japan	Not awarded as there was a tie for gold.	Vladimir Portnoi; Soviet Union	
1964 Tokyo	Gymnastics	Men's individual all-around	Yukio Endo; Japan	Viktor Lisitsky; Soviet Union Boris Shakhlin; Soviet Union Shuji Tsurumi; Japan	Not awarded as there was a tie for silver.	
1964 Tokyo	Gymnastics	Men's floor exercise	Franco Menichelli; Italy	Yukio Endo; Japan Viktor Lisitsky; Soviet Union	Not awarded as there was a tie for silver.	
1964 Tokyo	Gymnastics	Women's vault	Věra Čáslavská; Czechoslovakia	Larisa Latynina; Soviet Union Birgit Radochla; United Team of Germany	Not awarded as there was a tie for silver.	
1968 Mexico City	Gymnastics	Men's horizontal bar	Mikhail Voronin; Soviet Union Akinori Nakayama; Japan	Not awarded as there was a tie for gold.	Eizo Kenmotsu; Japan	
1968 Mexico City	Gymnastics	Women's floor	Larisa Petrik; Soviet Union Věra Čáslavská; Czechoslovakia	Not awarded as there was a tie for gold.	Natalia Kuchinskaya; Soviet Union	
1972 Munich	Football	Men's team	Poland	Hungary	Soviet Union East Germany	
1972 Munich	Gymnastics	Women's uneven bars	Karin Janz; East Germany	Olga Korbut; Soviet Union Erika Zuchold; East Germany	Not awarded as there was a tie for silver.	
1976 Montreal	Gymnastics	Men's horizontal bar	Mitsuo Tsukahara; Japan	Eizo Kenmotsu; Japan	Eberhard Gienger; West Germany Henri Boerio; France	
1976 Montreal	Gymnastics	Men's pommel horse	Zoltán Magyar; Hungary	Eizo Kenmotsu; Japan	Nikolai Andrianov; Soviet Union Michael Nikolay; East Germany	
1976 Montreal	Gymnastics	Women's vault	Nellie Kim; Soviet Union	Ludmila Tourischeva; Soviet Union Carola Dombeck; East Germany	Not awarded as there was a tie for silver.	
1980 Moscow	Athletics	Men's pole vault	Władysław Kozakiewicz; Poland	Konstantin Volkov; Soviet Union Tadeusz Ślusarski; Poland	Not awarded as there was a tie for silver.	
1980 Moscow	Gymnastics	Women's artistic individual all-around	Elena Davydova; Soviet Union	Maxi Gnauck; East Germany Nadia Comăneci; Romania	Not awarded as there was a tie for silver.	
1980 Moscow	Gymnastics	Women's floor	Nellie Kim; Soviet Union Nadia Comăneci; Romania	Not awarded as there was a tie for gold.	Natalia Shaposhnikova; Soviet Union Maxi Gnauck; East Germany	
1980 Moscow	Gymnastics	Women's uneven bars	Maxi Gnauck; East Germany	Emilia Eberle; Romania	Steffi Kräker; East Germany Melita Ruhn; Romania Maria Filatova; Soviet Union	
1984 Los Angeles	Athletics	Men's pole vault	Pierre Quinon; France	Mike Tully; United States	Earl Bell; United States Thierry Vigneron; France	
1984 Los Angeles	Athletics	Women's 100 metres hurdles	Benita Fitzgerald; United States	Shirley Strong; Great Britain	Michèle Chardonnet; France Kim Turner; United States	
1984 Los Angeles	Gymnastics	Men's floor	Li Ning; China	Lou Yun; China	Koji Sotomura; Japan Philippe Vatuone; France	
1984 Los Angeles	Gymnastics	Men's pommel horse	Li Ning; China Peter Vidmar; United States	Not awarded as there was a tie for gold.	Timothy Daggett; United States	
1984 Los Angeles	Gymnastics	Men's rings	Koji Gushiken; Japan Li Ning; China	Not awarded as there was a tie for gold.	Mitchell Gaylord; United States	
1984 Los Angeles	Gymnastics	Men's vault	Lou Yun; China	Mitchell Gaylord; United States Koji Gushiken; Japan Shinji Morisue; Japan Li Ning; China	Not awarded as there was a tie for silver.	
1984 Los Angeles	Gymnastics	Women's balance beam	Simona Păucă; Romania Ecaterina Szabo; Romania	Not awarded as there was a tie for gold.	Kathy Johnson; United States	
1984 Los Angeles	Gymnastics	Women's uneven bars	Ma Yanhong; China Julianne McNamara; United States	Not awarded as there was a tie for gold.	Mary Lou Retton; United States	
1984 Los Angeles	Swimming	Women's 100 metre freestyle	Carrie Steinseifer; United States Nancy Hogshead; United States	Not awarded as there was a tie for gold.	Annemarie Verstappen; Netherlands	
1988 Seoul	Athletics	Men's high jump	Hennadiy Avdyeyenko; Soviet Union	Hollis Conway; United States	Rudolf Povarnitsyn; Soviet Union Patrik Sjöberg; Sweden	
1988 Seoul	Gymnastics	Men's floor	Sergei Kharkov; Soviet Union	Vladimir Artemov; Soviet Union	Lou Yun; China Yukio Iketani; Japan	
1988 Seoul	Gymnastics	Men's horizontal bar	Vladimir Artemov; Soviet Union Valeri Liukin; Soviet Union	Not awarded as there was a tie for gold.	Holger Behrendt; East Germany Marius Gherman; Romania	
1988 Seoul	Gymnastics	Men's pommel horse	Lyubomir Gueraskov; Bulgaria Zsolt Borkai; Hungary Dmitri Bilozertchev; Soviet Union	Not awarded as there was a tie for gold.	Not awarded as there was a tie for gold.	
1988 Seoul	Gymnastics	Men's rings	Holger Behrendt; East Germany Dimitri Bilozertchev; Soviet Union	Not awarded as there was a tie for gold.	Sven Tippelt; East Germany	
1988 Seoul	Gymnastics	Women's balance beam	Daniela Silivaş; Romania	Elena Shushunova; Soviet Union	Gabriela Potorac; Romania Phoebe Mills; United States	
1988 Seoul	Swimming	Women's 50 metre freestyle	Kristin Otto; East Germany	Yang Wenyi; China	Jill Sterkel; United States Katrin Meissner; East Germany	
1992 Barcelona	Athletics	Men's high jump	Javier Sotomayor; Cuba	Patrik Sjöberg; Sweden	Hollis Conway; United States Tim Forsyth; Australia Artur Partyka; Poland	
1992 Barcelona	Gymnastics	Men's floor	Li Xiaoshuang; China	Yukio Iketani; Japan Grigory Misutin; Unified Team	Not awarded as there was a tie for silver.	
1992 Barcelona	Gymnastics	Men's horizontal bar	Trent Dimas; United States	Grigory Misutin; Unified Team Andreas Wecker; Germany	Not awarded as there was a tie for silver.	
1992 Barcelona	Gymnastics	Men's parallel bars	Vitaly Scherbo; Unified Team	Li Jing; China	Igor Korobchinski; Unified Team Guo Linyao; China Masayuki Matsunaga; Japan	
1992 Barcelona	Gymnastics	Men's pommel horse	Vitaly Scherbo; Unified Team Pae Gil-Su; North Korea	Not awarded as there was a tie for gold.	Andreas Wecker; Germany	
1992 Barcelona	Gymnastics	Men's rings	Vitaly Scherbo; Unified Team	Li Jing; China	Andreas Wecker; Germany Li Xiaoshuang; China	
1992 Barcelona	Gymnastics	Women's vault	Lavinia Miloşovici; Romania Henrietta Ónodi; Hungary	Not awarded as there was a tie for gold.	Tatiana Lysenko; Unified Team	
1992 Barcelona	Gymnastics	Women's balance beam	Tatiana Lysenko; Unified Team	Lu Li; China Shannon Miller; United States	Not awarded as there was a tie for silver.	
1992 Barcelona	Gymnastics	Women's floor	Lavinia Miloşovici; Romania	Henrietta Ónodi; Hungary	Cristina Bontaş; Romania Shannon Miller; United States Tatiana Gutsu; Unified Team	
1992 Barcelona	Synchronized swimming	Women's solo	Kristen Babb-Sprague; United States Sylvie Fréchette; Canada	Not awarded as there was a tie for gold.	Fumiko Okuno; Japan	
1996 Atlanta	Gymnastics	Men's horizontal bar	Andreas Wecker; Germany	Krasimir Dounev; Bulgaria	Fan Bin; China Alexei Nemov; Russia Vitaly Scherbo; Belarus	
1996 Atlanta	Gymnastics	Men's rings	Yuri Chechi; Italy	Szilveszter Csollány; Hungary Dan Burincă; Romania	Not awarded as there was a tie for silver.	
1996 Atlanta	Gymnastics	Women's artistic individual all-around	Lilia Podkopayeva; Ukraine	Gina Gogean; Romania	Simona Amânar; Romania Lavinia Miloşovici; Romania	
1996 Atlanta	Gymnastics	Women's uneven bars	Svetlana Khorkina; Russia	Bi Wenjing; China Amy Chow; United States	Not awarded as there was a tie for silver.	
2000 Sydney	Athletics	Women's 100 metres	Not awarded due to medal re-awarding.	Ekaterini Thanou; Greece Tayna Lawrence; Jamaica	Merlene Ottey; Jamaica	(Note: Marion Jones of the United States admitted to having taken performance enhancing drugs prior to the 2000 Summer Olympics and was stripped of her gold medal in 2007. The IOC did not initially decide to regrade the results, as silver medalist Ekaterini Thanou had herself been subsequently involved in a doping scandal in the run-up to the 2004 Summer Olympics. After two years of deliberation, in late 2009, the IOC decided to upgrade Tayna Lawrence and Merlene Ottey to silver and bronze respectively, and leave Thanou as a silver medallist, with the gold medal withheld.)
2000 Sydney	Athletics	Women's high jump	Yelena Yelesina; Russia	Hestrie Cloete; South Africa	Kajsa Bergqvist; Sweden Oana Pantelimon; Romania	
2000 Sydney	Swimming	Men's 50 metre freestyle	Anthony Ervin; United States Gary Hall, Jr. United States	Not awarded as there was a tie for gold.	Pieter van den Hoogenband; Netherlands	
2000 Sydney	Swimming	Women's 100 metre freestyle	Inge de Bruijn; Netherlands	Therese Alshammar; Sweden	Dara Torres; United States Jenny Thompson; United States	
2004 Athens	Swimming	Women's 200 metre backstroke	Kirsty Coventry; Zimbabwe	Stanislava Komarova; Russia	Antje Buschschulte; Germany Reiko Nakamura; Japan	
2008 Beijing	Athletics	Women's 100 metres	Shelly-Ann Fraser; Jamaica	Sherone Simpson; Jamaica Kerron Stewart; Jamaica	Not awarded as there was a tie for silver.	
2008 Beijing	Swimming	Men's 100 metre freestyle	Alain Bernard; France	Eamon Sullivan; Australia	Jason Lezak; United States César Cielo; Brazil	
2008 Beijing	Swimming	Men's 100 metre backstroke	Aaron Peirsol; United States	Matt Grevers; United States	Arkady Vyatchanin; Russia Hayden Stoeckel; Australia	
2012 London	Athletics	Men's high jump	Erik Kynard; United States	Mutaz Essa Barshim; Qatar Derek Drouin; Canada Robert Grabarz; Great Britain	Not awarded as there was a tie for silver and medal re-awarding.	(Note: Ivan Ukhov of Russia was stripped of his gold medal for doping offences in 2019.)
2012 London	Cycling	Men's keirin	Chris Hoy; Great Britain	Maximilian Levy; Germany	Simon van Velthooven; New Zealand Teun Mulder; Netherlands	
2012 London	Swimming	Men's 200 metre freestyle	Yannick Agnel; France	Sun Yang; China Park Tae-Hwan; South Korea	Not awarded as there was a tie for silver.	
2012 London	Swimming	Men's 100 metre butterfly	Michael Phelps; United States	Chad le Clos; South Africa Yevgeny Korotyshkin; Russia	Not awarded as there was a tie for silver.	
2012 London	Wrestling	Men's freestyle 120 kg	Komeil Ghasemi; Iran Bilyal Makhov; Russia	Not awarded as there was a tie for gold.	Tervel Dlagnev; United States Daulet Shabanbay; Kazakhstan (awarded due to repechage)	
2016 Rio de Janeiro	Canoeing	Men's K-1 200 metres	Liam Heath; Great Britain	Maxime Beaumont; France	Saúl Craviotto; Spain Ronald Rauhe; Germany	
2016 Rio de Janeiro	Swimming	Men's 100 metre butterfly	Joseph Schooling; Singapore	Michael Phelps; United States Chad le Clos; South Africa László Cseh; Hungary	Not awarded as there was a tie for silver.	
2016 Rio de Janeiro	Swimming	Women's 100 metre freestyle	Simone Manuel; United States Penny Oleksiak; Canada	Not awarded as there was a tie for gold.	Sarah Sjöström; Sweden	
2016 Rio de Janeiro	Swimming	Women's 100 metre backstroke	Katinka Hosszú; Hungary	Kathleen Baker; United States	Kylie Masse; Canada Fu Yuanhui; China	
2020 Tokyo	Athletics	Men's high jump	Gianmarco Tamberi; Italy Mutaz Essa Barshim; Qatar	Not awarded as there was a tie for gold.	Maksim Nedasekau; Belarus	
2020 Tokyo	Gymnastics	Women's floor	Jade Carey; United States	Vanessa Ferrari; Italy	Mai Murakami; Japan Angelina Melnikova; ROC	
2024 Paris	Swimming	Men's 100 metre breaststroke	Nicolò Martinenghi; Italy	Adam Peaty; Great Britain Nic Fink; United States	Not awarded as there was a tie for silver.	
2024 Paris	Athletics	Women's high jump	Yaroslava Mahuchikh; Ukraine	Nicola Olyslagers; Australia	Iryna Herashchenko; Ukraine Eleanor Patterson; Australia	
2024 Paris	Gymnastics	Men's horizontal bar	Shinnosuke Oka; Japan	Ángel Barajas; Colombia	Zhang Boheng; China Tang Chia-hung; Chinese Taipei	
2024 Paris	Canoeing	Women's K-2 500 metres	New Zealand; Lisa Carrington; Alicia Hoskin	Hungary; Tamara Csipes; Alida Dóra Gazsó	Germany; Paulina Paszek; Jule Hake Hungary; Noémi Pupp; Sára Fojt	

== List of ties at the Winter Olympics ==
Games	Sport	Event	Gold	Silver	Bronze	Ref.
1924 Chamonix	Speed skating	Men's 500 metres	Charles Jewtraw; United States	Oskar Olsen; Norway	Roald Larsen; Norway Clas Thunberg; Finland	
1928 St. Moritz	Speed skating	Men's 500 metres	Bernt Evensen; Norway Clas Thunberg; Finland	Not awarded as there was a tie for gold.	John Farrell; United States Jaakko Friman; Finland Roald Larsen; Norway	
1948 St. Moritz	Alpine skiing	Men's downhill	Henri Oreiller; France	Franz Gabl; Austria	Rolf Olinger; Switzerland Karl Molitor; Switzerland	
1948 St. Moritz	Speed skating	Men's 500 metres	Finn Helgesen; Norway	Ken Bartholomew; United States Thomas Byberg; Norway Robert Fitzgerald; United States	Not awarded as there was a tie for silver.	
1952 Oslo	Speed skating	Men's 500 metres	Ken Henry; United States	Don McDermott; United States	Gordon Audley; Canada Arne Johansen; Norway	
1956 Cortina d'Ampezzo	Speed skating	Men's 1500 metres	Yevgeny Grishin; Soviet Union Yuri Mikhaylov; Soviet Union	Not awarded as there was a tie for gold.	Toivo Salonen; Finland	
1960 Squaw Valley	Speed skating	Men's 1500 metres	Roald Aas; Norway Yevgeny Grishin; Soviet Union	Not awarded as there was a tie for gold.	Boris Stenin; Soviet Union	
1964 Innsbruck	Alpine skiing	Women's giant slalom	Marielle Goitschel; France	Christine Goitschel; France Jean Saubert; United States	Not awarded as there was a tie for silver.	
1964 Innsbruck	Figure skating	Pairs	Soviet Union; Ludmila Belousova; Oleg Protopopov	United Team of Germany; Marika Kilius; Hans-Jürgen Bäumler Canada; Debbi Wilkes; Guy Revell	United States; Vivian Joseph; Ronald Joseph	(Note: In 1966, Marika Kilius and Hans-Jürgen Bäumler's results were invalidated after it was discovered that they had signed professional contracts before the Olympics. At the time, only amateurs were allowed to compete in the Olympic Games. The silver medals were transferred to Debbi Wilkes and Guy Revell and the bronze medals to Vivian Joseph and Ronald Joseph. Kilius and Bäumler were re-awarded the silvers in 1987, after appealing that other pairs had signed similar contracts but had not been exposed and disqualified. The placements of Wilkes/Revell and Joseph/Joseph remained unclear for many years. In December 2013, the IOC clarified that Wilkes/Revell had not been stripped of their silver after the Germans regained their medals. In November 2014, the IOC stated that both Kilius/Bäumler and Wilkes/Revell are the silver medalists and Joseph/Joseph are the bronze medalists.)
1964 Innsbruck	Speed skating	Men's 500 metres	Terry McDermott; United States	Alv Gjestvang; Norway Yevgeny Grishin; Soviet Union Vladimir Orlov; Soviet Union	Not awarded as there was a tie for silver.	
1964 Innsbruck	Speed skating	Women's 3000 metres	Lidiya Skoblikova; Soviet Union	Han Pil-Hwa; North Korea Valentina Stenina; Soviet Union	Not awarded as there was a tie for silver.	
1968 Grenoble	Speed skating	Women's 500 metres	Lyudmila Titova; Soviet Union	Jenny Fish; United States Dianne Holum; United States Mary Meyers; United States	Not awarded as there was a tie for silver.	
1968 Grenoble	Speed skating	Men's 1500 metres	Kees Verkerk; Netherlands	Ivar Eriksen; Norway Ard Schenk; Netherlands	Not awarded as there was a tie for silver.	
1968 Grenoble	Speed skating	Men's 500 metres	Erhard Keller; West Germany	Terry McDermott; United States Magne Thomassen; Norway	Not awarded as there was a tie for silver.	
1972 Sapporo	Luge	Doubles	East Germany; Horst Hörnlein; Reinhard Bredow Italy; Paul Hildgartner; Walter Plaikner	Not awarded as there was a tie for gold.	East Germany; Klaus-Michael Bonsack; Wolfram Fiedler	
1980 Lake Placid	Ski jumping	Normal hill individual	Toni Innauer; Austria	Hirokazu Yagi; Japan Manfred Deckert; East Germany	Not awarded as there was a tie for silver.	
1980 Lake Placid	Speed skating	Men's 1000 metres	Eric Heiden; United States	Gaétan Boucher; Canada	Vladimir Lobanov; Soviet Union Frode Rønning; Norway	
1992 Albertville	Alpine skiing	Women's giant slalom	Pernilla Wiberg; Sweden	Anita Wachter; Austria Diann Roffe; United States	Not awarded as there was a tie for silver.	
1998 Nagano	Alpine skiing	Men's super-G	Hermann Maier; Austria	Didier Cuche; Switzerland Hans Knauss; Austria	Not awarded as there was a tie for silver.	
1998 Nagano	Bobsleigh	Two-man	Italy (ITA-1); Günther Huber; Antonio Tartaglia Canada (CAN-1); Pierre Lueders; Dave MacEachern	Not awarded as there was a tie for gold.	Germany (GER-1); Christoph Langen; Markus Zimmermann	
1998 Nagano	Bobsleigh	Four-man	Germany (GER-2); Christoph Langen; Markus Zimmermann; Marco Jakobs; Olaf Hampel	Switzerland (SUI-1); Marcel Rohner; Markus Nüssli; Markus Wasser; Beat Seitz	Great Britain; Sean Olsson; Dean Ward; Courtney Rumbolt; Paul Attwood France; Bruno Mingeon; Emmanuel Hostache; Éric Le Chanony; Max Robert	
2002 Salt Lake City	Cross-country skiing	Men's 2 x 10 kilometre pursuit	Frode Estil; Norway Thomas Alsgaard; Norway	Not awarded as there was a tie for gold.	Per Elofsson; Sweden	
2002 Salt Lake City	Figure skating	Pairs	Russia; Elena Berezhnaya; Anton Sikharulidze Canada; Jamie Salé; David Pelletier	Not awarded due to medal re-awarding.	China; Shen Xue; Zhao Hongbo	(Note: The Russian pair of Yelena Berezhnaya and Anton Sikharulidze competed against the Canadian pair of Jamie Salé and David Pelletier for the gold medal. The Canadians appeared to have skated well enough to win, yet the Russians were awarded the gold. The judging broke along Cold War lines with judges from former Communist countries favouring the Russian pair and judges from Western nations voting for the Canadians. The only exception was the French judge, Marie-Reine Le Gougne, who awarded the gold to the Russians. An investigation revealed that Le Gougne had been pressured to give the gold to the Russian pair regardless of how they skated; in return the Russian judge would look favourably on the French entrants in the ice dancing competition. The IOC decided to award both pairs the gold medal in a second medal ceremony held later in the Games.)
2010 Vancouver	Biathlon	Men's individual	Emil Hegle Svendsen; Norway	Ole Einar Bjørndalen; Norway Sergey Novikov; Belarus	Not awarded as there was a tie for silver.	
2014 Sochi	Alpine skiing	Men's super-G	Kjetil Jansrud; Norway	Andrew Weibrecht; United States	Jan Hudec; Canada Bode Miller; United States	
2014 Sochi	Alpine skiing	Women's downhill	Tina Maze; Slovenia Dominique Gisin; Switzerland	Not awarded as there was a tie for gold.	Lara Gut; Switzerland	
2018 Pyeongchang	Cross-country skiing	Women's 10 kilometre freestyle	Ragnhild Haga; Norway	Charlotte Kalla; Sweden	Marit Bjørgen; Norway Krista Pärmäkoski; Finland	
2018 Pyeongchang	Bobsleigh	Two-man	Germany; Francesco Friedrich; Thorsten Margis Canada; Justin Kripps; Alexander Kopacz	Not awarded as there was a tie for gold.	Latvia; Oskars Melbārdis; Jānis Strenga	
2018 Pyeongchang	Bobsleigh	Four-man	Germany; Francesco Friedrich; Candy Bauer; Martin Grothkopp; Thorsten Margis	Germany; Nico Walther; Kevin Kuske; Alexander Rödiger; Eric Franke South Korea; Won Yun-jong; Jun Jung-lin; Seo Young-woo; Kim Dong-hyun	Not awarded as there was a tie for silver.	
2022 Beijing	Freestyle skiing	Women's ski cross	Sandra Näslund; Sweden	Marielle Thompson; Canada	Daniela Maier; Germany Fanny Smith; Switzerland	(Note: The tie for the bronze medal was not due to identical results, but a Court of Arbitration of Sport decision on 13 December 2022 in regards to an interference call in the final.)
2026 Milano Cortina	Alpine skiing	Men's team combined	Switzerland; Franjo von Allmen; Tanguy Nef	Austria; Vincent Kriechmayr; Manuel Feller Switzerland; Marco Odermatt; Loïc Meillard	Not awarded as there was a tie for silver.	
2026 Milano Cortina	Ski jumping	Men's normal hill individual	Philipp Raimund; Germany	Kacper Tomasiak; Poland	Ren Nikaidō; Japan Gregor Deschwanden; Switzerland	
2026 Milano Cortina	Alpine skiing	Women's giant slalom	Federica Brignone; Italy	Sara Hector; Sweden Thea Louise Stjernesund; Norway	Not awarded as there was a tie for silver.	

== Ties not included in this list ==
This list does not include events where two bronze medals are awarded due to repechage or the non-existence of a bronze-medal playoff as they are awarded due to the rules of the sports, thus not considered as ties. All events that are not listed, namely those below, awarded two bronze medals.

Sport	Years	Reason
Water polo	1900	No bronze medal playoff
Polo	1900	No bronze medal playoff
Rowing	1908	Bronze awarded in both semi-finals to second-place finishers
Tennis	1896–1904, 1988–1992	No bronze medal playoff
Badminton	1992	No bronze medal playoff
Table tennis	1992	No bronze medal playoff
Boxing	1952–present	No bronze medal playoff
Karate	2020	No bronze medal playoff
Judo	1964, 1972–present	Repechage
Taekwondo	2008–present	Repechage
Wrestling	2008 –present	Repechage

In addition, two finals were held for one rowing event at the 1900 Olympics, men's coxed four. This was due to a controversy about which boats should advance to the final; thus two separate finals were held, awarding two sets of medals for the same event, both which are considered Olympic championships by the International Olympic Committee.

Similarly, two finals were held for some sailing events at the 1900 Olympics, namely 0 to .5 ton, .5 to 1 ton, 1 to 2 ton, 2 to 3 ton and 3 to 10 ton. (Note: In this event, however, only the second race winners are listed in the IOC's database.)

== See also ==
- All-time Olympic Games medal table
