= List of 1998 Winter Olympics medal winners =

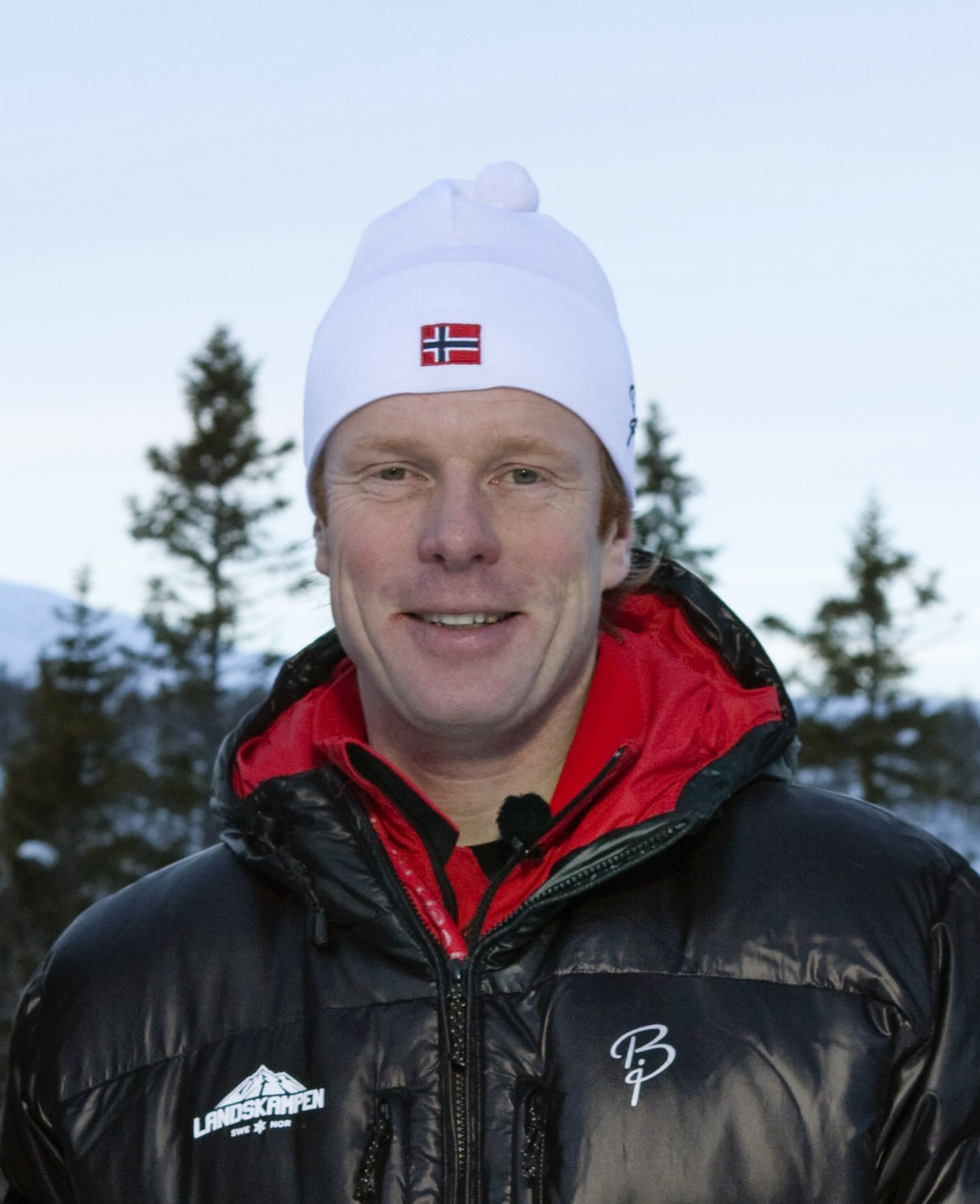
Bjørn Dæhlie of Norway (pictured here in 2011) won four medals in cross-country skiing in Nagano.

The 1998 Winter Olympics, officially known as the XVIII Olympic Winter Games, was a winter multi-sport event held in Nagano, Japan, from 7 to 22 February 1998. A total of 2,176 athletes representing 72 National Olympic Committees (NOCs) participated in the Games in 68 events across 14 disciplines.

The discipline of snowboarding made its debut, with four events contested, two for men and two for women. Additionally, the Olympic program saw the addition of a women's tournament in ice hockey, the first time that women had participated in that sport in Olympic history. At the time, it was believed that curling made its debut as a medal event, having been a demonstration sport three times at the 1932, 1988, and 1992 Winter Olympics; however, in 2006, the International Olympic Committee ruled that the 1924 Olympic tournament in Chamonix, France, had been an official medal event, retroactively making the Nagano tournament the second time curling has been contested for official medals.

Germany won the most medals, with 29, and the most gold medals, with 12. Norway finished second in both tallies, with 10 gold medals and 25 medals of all colors. Of the 72 NOCs to participate at Nagano, 24 won at least one medal, 15 of those won at least one gold medal. Denmark, participating in a Winter Olympic Games for the ninth time, won its first-ever medal at a Winter Olympics. Bulgaria and the Czech Republic won their first Winter Olympic gold medals in Nagano. The Czech Republic had previously won two gold medals as part of Czechoslovakia, and Bulgaria had won a bronze medal in the 1980 Winter Olympics.

Larisa Lazutina of Russia won five medals, the most of any competitor; she won three golds, a silver, and a bronze medal in cross-country skiing, winning a medal in every women's event in her sport. Norwegian cross-country skier Bjørn Dæhlie won four medals, including three golds. A further nine competitors earned three medals apiece, with forty-seven total individuals winning multiple medals.

== Alpine skiing ==
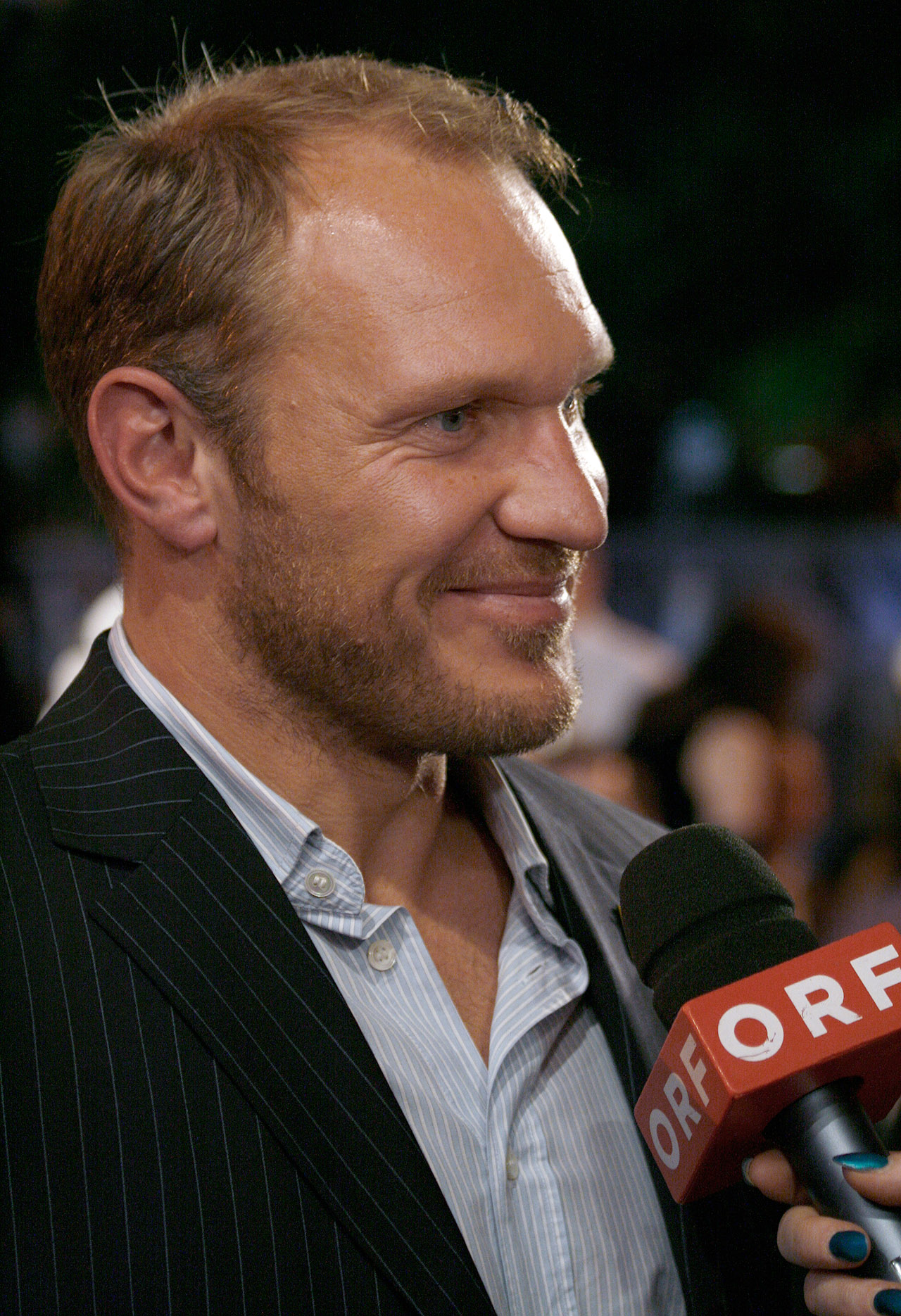
Hermann Maier, here pictured in 2009, won two gold medals at the 1998 Games.

Event	Gold	Silver	Bronze
Men's downhill	Jean-Luc Crétier; France	Lasse Kjus; Norway	Hannes Trinkl; Austria
Men's slalom	Hans Petter Buraas; Norway	Ole Kristian Furuseth; Norway	Thomas Sykora; Austria
Men's giant slalom	Hermann Maier; Austria	Stephan Eberharter; Austria	Michael von Grünigen; Switzerland
Men's super-G	Hermann Maier; Austria	Didier Cuche; Switzerland	None awarded^{[a]}
Men's super-G	Hermann Maier; Austria	Hans Knauß; Austria	None awarded^{[a]}
Men's combined	Mario Reiter; Austria	Lasse Kjus; Norway	Christian Mayer; Austria
Women's downhill	Katja Seizinger; Germany	Pernilla Wiberg; Sweden	Florence Masnada; France
Women's slalom	Hilde Gerg; Germany	Deborah Compagnoni; Italy	Zali Steggall; Australia
Women's giant slalom	Deborah Compagnoni; Italy	Alexandra Meissnitzer; Austria	Katja Seizinger; Germany
Women's super-G	Picabo Street; United States	Michaela Dorfmeister; Austria	Alexandra Meissnitzer; Austria
Women's combined	Katja Seizinger; Germany	Martina Ertl; Germany	Hilde Gerg; Germany

== Biathlon ==
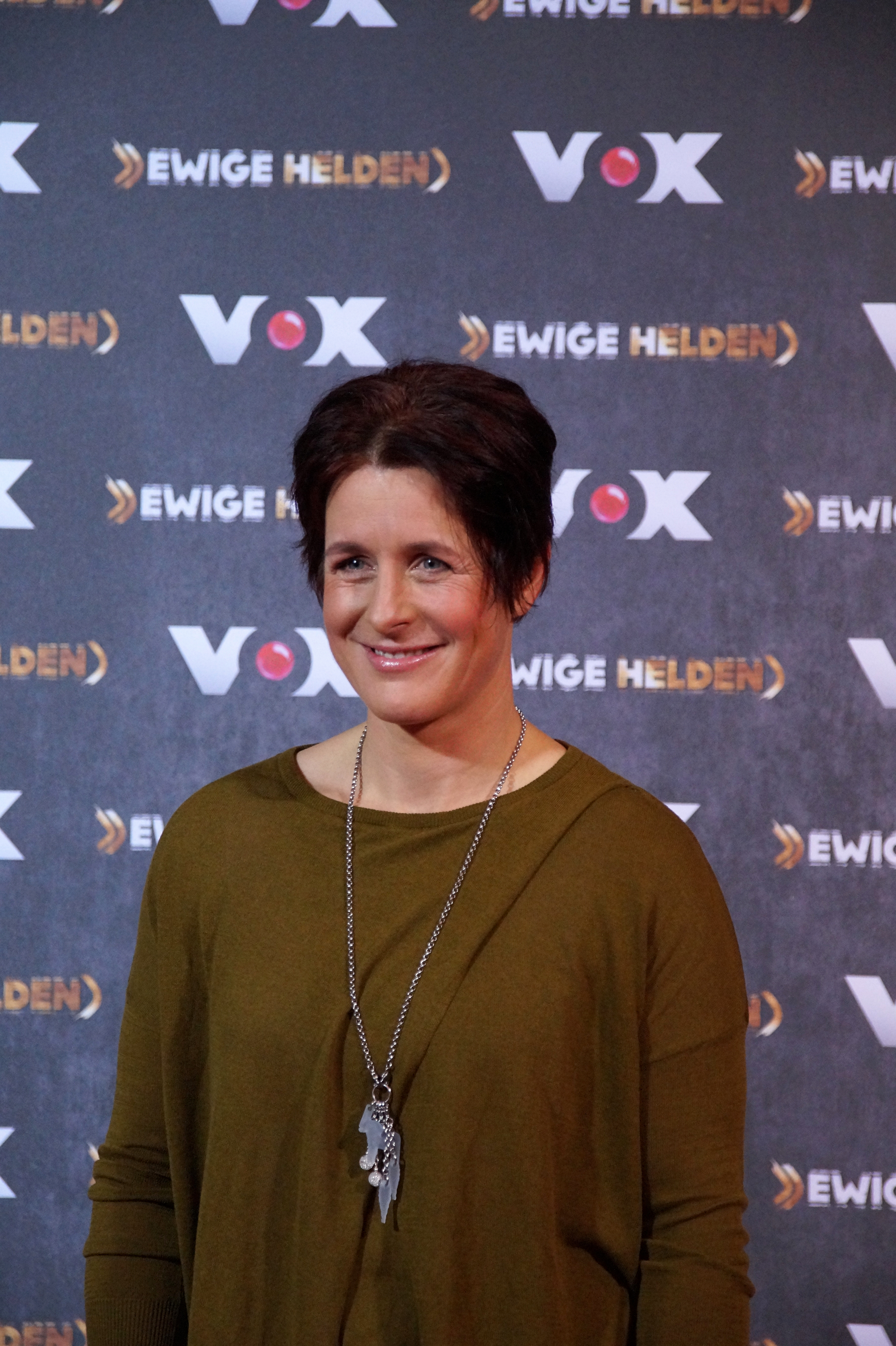
Uschi Disl won three medals in biathlon at Nagano.

Event	Gold	Silver	Bronze
Men's 20 km	Halvard Hanevold; Norway	Pieralberto Carrara; Italy	Alexei Aidarov; Belarus
Men's 10 km	Ole Einar Bjørndalen; Norway	Frode Andresen; Norway	Ville Räikkönen; Finland
Men's 4 × 7.5 km	Germany; Ricco Groß; Peter Sendel; Sven Fischer; Frank Luck	Norway; Egil Gjelland; Halvard Hanevold; Dag Bjørndalen; Ole Einar Bjørndalen	Russia; Pavel Muslimov; Vladimir Drachev; Sergei Tarasov; Viktor Maigourov
Women's 15 km	Ekaterina Dafovska; Bulgaria	Olena Petrova; Ukraine	Uschi Disl; Germany
Women's 7.5 km	Galina Koukleva; Russia	Uschi Disl; Germany	Katrin Apel; Germany
Women's 4 × 7.5 km	Germany; Uschi Disl; Martina Zellner; Katrin Apel; Petra Behle	Russia; Olga Melnik; Galina Koukleva; Albina Akhatova; Olga Romasko	Norway; Ann-Elen Skjelbreid; Annette Sikveland; Gunn Margit Andreassen; Liv Grete Skjelbreid Poirée

== Bobsleigh ==
Event	Gold	Silver	Bronze
Two-man	Canada; Pierre Lueders; David MacEachern	none awarded^{[b]}	Germany; Christoph Langen; Markus Zimmermann
Two-man	Italy; Günther Huber; Antonio Tartaglia	none awarded^{[b]}	Germany; Christoph Langen; Markus Zimmermann
Four-man	Germany; Christoph Langen; Markus Zimmermann; Marco Jakobs; Olaf Hampel	Switzerland; Marcel Rohner; Markus Nüssli; Markus Wasser; Beat Seitz	France; Bruno Mingeon; Emmanuel Hostache; Éric Le Chanony; Max Robert
Four-man	Germany; Christoph Langen; Markus Zimmermann; Marco Jakobs; Olaf Hampel	Switzerland; Marcel Rohner; Markus Nüssli; Markus Wasser; Beat Seitz	Great Britain; Sean Olsson; Dean Ward; Courtney Rumbolt; Paul Attwood

== Cross-country skiing ==
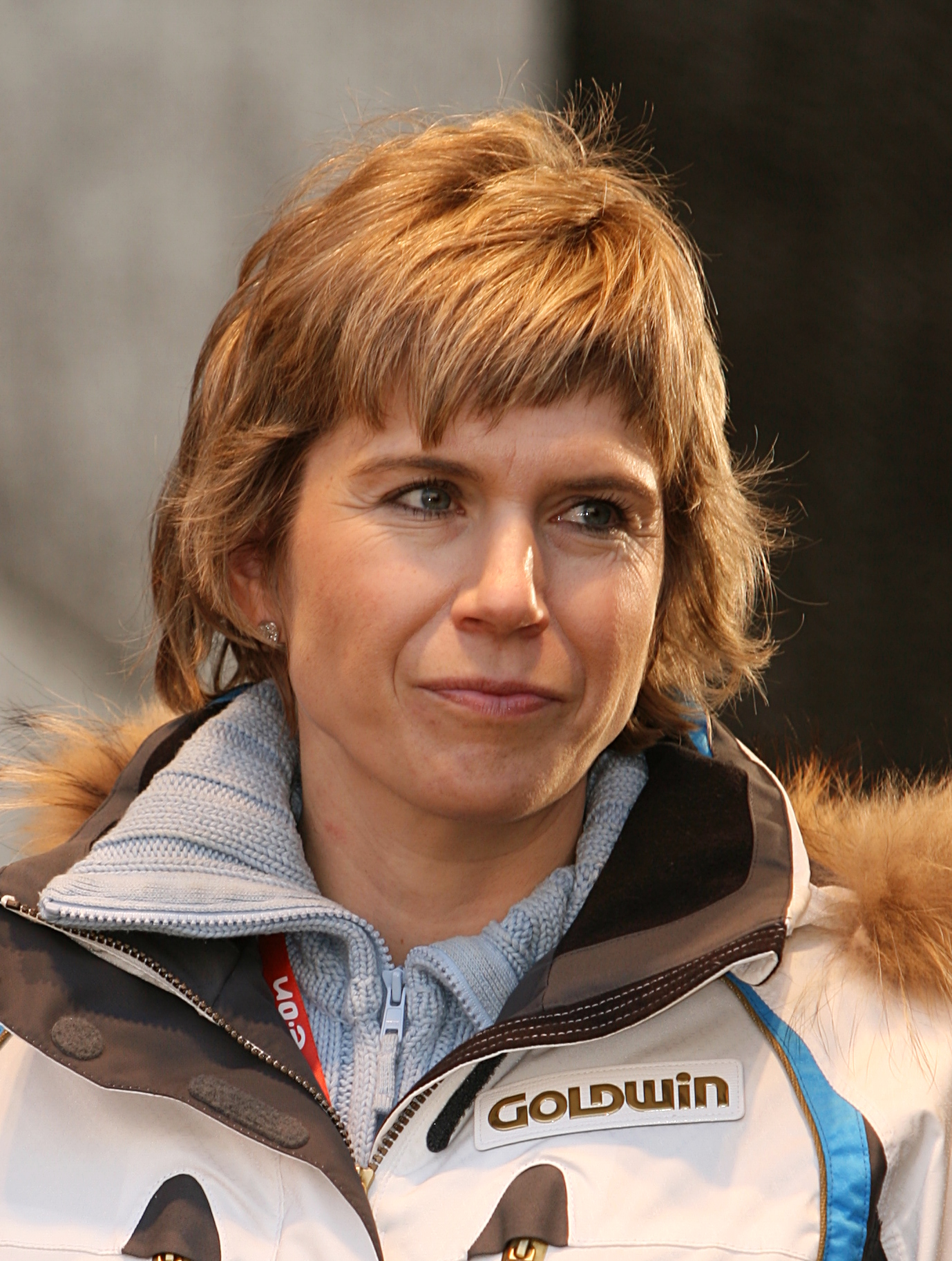
Kateřina Neumannová won a silver medal in the 5 km classical race.

Event	Gold	Silver	Bronze
Men's 10 km classical	Bjørn Dæhlie; Norway	Markus Gandler; Austria	Mika Myllylä; Finland
Men's 15 km freestyle pursuit	Thomas Alsgaard; Norway	Bjørn Dæhlie; Norway	Vladimir Smirnov; Kazakhstan
Men's 30 km classical	Mika Myllylä; Finland	Erling Jevne; Norway	Silvio Fauner; Italy
Men's 50 km freestyle	Bjørn Dæhlie; Norway	Niklas Jonsson; Sweden	Christian Hoffmann; Austria
Men's 4 × 10 km relay	Norway; Sture Sivertsen; Erling Jevne; Bjørn Dæhlie; Thomas Alsgaard	Italy; Marco Albarello; Fulvio Valbusa; Fabio Maj; Silvio Fauner	Finland; Harri Kirvesniemi; Mika Myllylä; Sami Repo; Jari Isometsä
Women's 5 km classical	Larisa Lazutina; Russia	Kateřina Neumannová; Czech Republic	Bente Martinsen; Norway
Women's Combined 5 km + 10 km pursuit	Larisa Lazutina; Russia	Olga Danilova; Russia	Kateřina Neumannová; Czech Republic
Women's 15 km classical	Olga Danilova; Russia	Larisa Lazutina; Russia	Anita Moen-Guidon; Norway
Women's 30 km freestyle	Yuliya Chepalova; Russia	Stefania Belmondo; Italy	Larisa Lazutina; Russia
Women's 4 × 5 km relay	Russia; Nina Gavrilyuk; Olga Danilova; Yelena Välbe; Larisa Lazutina	Norway; Bente Martinsen; Marit Mikkelsplass; Elin Nilsen; Anita Moen-Guidon	Italy; Karin Moroder; Gabriella Paruzzi; Manuela Di Centa; Stefania Belmondo

== Curling ==
Event	Gold	Silver	Bronze
Men's	Switzerland; Patrick Hürlimann; Patrik Lörtscher; Daniel Müller; Diego Perren; Dominic Andres	Canada; Mike Harris; Richard Hart; George Karrys; Collin Mitchell; Paul Savage	Norway; Eigil Ramsfjell; Jan Thoresen; Stig-Arne Gunnestad; Anthon Grimsmo; Tore Torvbråten
Women's	Canada; Sandra Schmirler; Jan Betker; Joan McCusker; Marcia Gudereit; Atina Ford	Denmark; Helena Blach Lavrsen; Margit Pörtner; Dorthe Holm; Trine Qvist; Jane Bidstrup	Sweden; Elisabet Gustafson; Katarina Nyberg; Louise Marmont; Elisabeth Persson; Margaretha Lindahl

== Figure skating ==
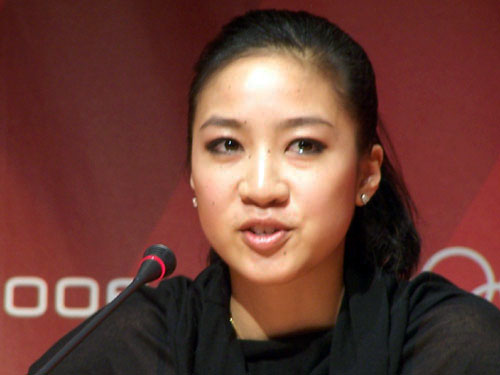
Michelle Kwan, silver medalist in ladies' singles

Event	Gold	Silver	Bronze
Men's singles	Ilia Kulik; Russia	Elvis Stojko; Canada	Philippe Candeloro; France
Ladies' singles	Tara Lipinski; United States	Michelle Kwan; United States	Chen Lu; China
Pairs	Russia; Oksana Kazakova; Artur Dmitriev	Russia; Elena Berezhnaya; Anton Sikharulidze	Germany; Mandy Wötzel; Ingo Steuer
Ice dancing	Russia; Pasha Grishuk; Evgeny Platov	Russia; Anjelika Krylova; Oleg Ovsyannikov	France; Marina Anissina; Gwendal Peizerat

== Freestyle skiing ==
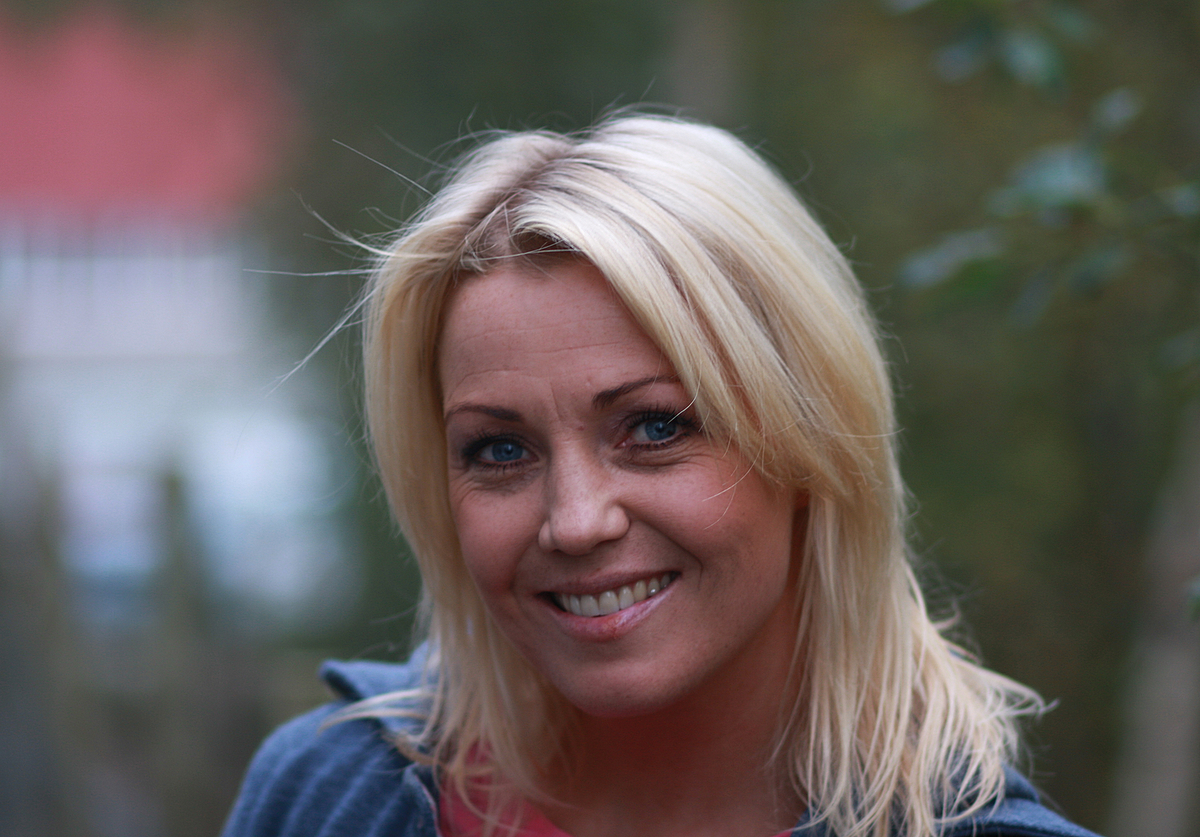
Kari Traa, bronze medalist in moguls

Event	Gold	Silver	Bronze
Men's moguls	Jonny Moseley; United States	Janne Lahtela; Finland	Sami Mustonen; Finland
Men's aerials	Eric Bergoust; United States	Sébastien Foucras; France	Dmitri Dashinski; Belarus
Women's moguls	Tae Satoya; Japan	Tatjana Mittermayer; Germany	Kari Traa; Norway
Women's aerials	Nikki Stone; United States	Xu Nannan; China	Colette Brand; Switzerland

== Ice hockey ==
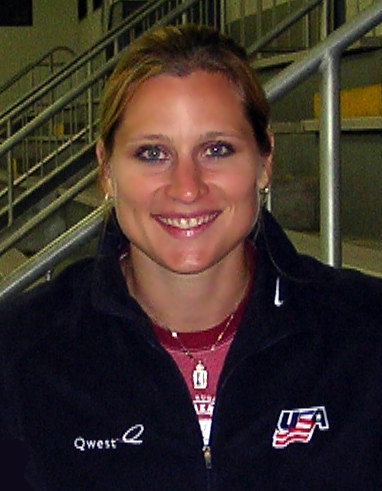
Angela Ruggiero was part of the United States gold medal-winning ice hockey team.

Event	Gold	Silver	Bronze
Men's team	Czech Republic; Josef Beránek; Jan Čaloun; Roman Čechmánek; Jiří Dopita; Roman Hamrlík; Dominik Hašek; Milan Hejduk; Jaromír Jágr; František Kučera; Robert Lang; David Moravec; Pavel Patera; Libor Procházka; Martin Procházka; Robert Reichel; Martin Ručínský; Vladimír Růžička; Jiří Šlégr; Richard Šmehlík; Jaroslav Špaček; Martin Straka; Petr Svoboda	Russia; Pavel Bure; Valeri Bure; Sergei Fedorov; Sergei Gonchar; Alexei Gusarov; Valeri Kamensky; Darius Kasparaitis; Andrei Kovalenko; Igor Kravchuk; Sergei Krivokrasov; Boris Mironov; Dmitri Mironov; Aleksey Morozov; Sergei Nemchinov; Oleg Shevtsov; Mikhail Shtalenkov; German Titov; Andrei Trefilov; Alexei Yashin; Dmitri Yushkevich; Valeri Zelepukin; Alexei Zhamnov; Alexei Zhitnik	Finland; Aki-Petteri Berg; Tuomas Grönman; Raimo Helminen; Sami Kapanen; Saku Koivu; Jari Kurri; Janne Laukkanen; Jere Lehtinen; Juha Lind; Jyrki Lumme; Jarmo Myllys; Mika Nieminen; Janne Niinimaa; Teppo Numminen; Ville Peltonen; Kimmo Rintanen; Teemu Selänne; Ari Sulander; Jukka Tammi; Esa Tikkanen; Kimmo Timonen; Antti Törmänen; Juha Ylönen
Women's team	United States; Chris Bailey; Laurie Baker; Alana Blahoski; Lisa Brown-Miller; Karyn Bye; Colleen Coyne; Sara Decosta; Tricia Dunn-Luoma; Cammi Granato; Katie King; Shelley Looney; Sue Merz; Allison Mleczko; Tara Mounsey; Vicki Movsessian; Jenny Potter; Angela Ruggiero; Sarah Tueting; Gretchen Ulion; Sandra Whyte	Canada; Jennifer Botterill; Thérèse Brisson; Cassie Campbell; Judy Diduck; Nancy Drolet; Lori Dupuis; Danielle Goyette; Geraldine Heaney; Jayna Hefford; Becky Kellar; Kathy McCormack; Karen Nystrom; Lesley Reddon; Manon Rhéaume; Laura Schuler; Fiona Smith; France St-Louis; Vicky Sunohara; Hayley Wickenheiser; Stacy Wilson	Finland; Sari Fisk; Kirsi Hänninen; Satu Huotari; Marianne Ihalainen; Johanna Ikonen; Sari Krooks; Emma Laaksonen; Sanna Lankosaari; Katja Lehto; Marika Lehtimäki; Riikka Nieminen; Marja-Helena Pälvilä; Tuula Puputti; Karoliina Rantamäki; Tiia Reima; Katja Riipi; Päivi Salo; Maria Selin; Liisa-Maria Sneck; Petra Vaarakallio

== Luge ==
Event	Gold	Silver	Bronze
Men's singles	Georg Hackl; Germany	Armin Zöggeler; Italy	Jens Müller; Germany
Women's singles	Silke Kraushaar; Germany	Barbara Niedernhuber; Germany	Angelika Neuner; Austria
Men's doubles	Germany; Stefan Krauße; Jan Behrendt	United States; Chris Thorpe; Gordon Sheer	United States; Mark Grimmette; Brian Martin

== Nordic combined ==
Event	Gold	Silver	Bronze
Individual	Bjarte Engen Vik; Norway	Samppa Lajunen; Finland	Valeri Stolyarov; Russia
Team	Norway; Halldor Skard; Kenneth Braaten; Bjarte Engen Vik; Fred Børre Lundberg	Finland; Samppa Lajunen; Jari Mantila; Tapio Nurmela; Hannu Manninen	France; Sylvain Guillaume; Nicolas Bal; Ludovic Roux; Fabrice Guy

== Short track speed skating ==
Event	Gold	Silver	Bronze
Men's 500 m	Takafumi Nishitani; Japan	An Yulong; China	Hitoshi Uematsu; Japan
Men's 1,000 m	Kim Dong-sung; South Korea	Li Jiajun; China	Éric Bédard; Canada
Men's 5,000 m relay	Canada; Éric Bédard; Derrick Campbell; François Drolet; Marc Gagnon	South Korea; Chae Ji-hoon; Lee Jun-hwan; Lee Ho-eung; Kim Dong-sung	China; Li Jiajun; Feng Kai; Yuan Ye; An Yulong
Women's 500 m	Annie Perreault; Canada	Yang Yang (S); China	Chun Lee-kyung; South Korea
Women's 1,000 m	Chun Lee-kyung; South Korea	Yang Yang (S); China	Won Hye-kyung; South Korea
Women's 3,000 m relay	South Korea; Chun Lee-kyung; Won Hye-kyung; An Sang-mi; Kim Yun-mi	China; Yang Yang (A); Yang Yang (S); Wang Chunlu; Sun Dandan	Canada; Christine Boudrias; Isabelle Charest; Annie Perreault; Tania Vicent

== Ski jumping ==
Event	Gold	Silver	Bronze
Individual, normal hill	Jani Soininen; Finland	Kazuyoshi Funaki; Japan	Andreas Widhölzl; Austria
Individual, large hill	Kazuyoshi Funaki; Japan	Jani Soininen; Finland	Masahiko Harada; Japan
Team	Japan; Takanobu Okabe; Hiroya Saitō; Masahiko Harada; Kazuyoshi Funaki	Germany; Sven Hannawald; Martin Schmitt; Hansjörg Jäkle; Dieter Thoma	Austria; Reinhard Schwarzenberger; Martin Höllwarth; Stefan Horngacher; Andreas Widhölzl

== Snowboarding ==
Event	Gold	Silver	Bronze
Men's halfpipe	Gian Simmen; Switzerland	Daniel Franck; Norway	Ross Powers; United States
Men's giant slalom	Ross Rebagliati; Canada	Thomas Prugger; Italy	Ueli Kestenholz; Switzerland
Women's halfpipe	Nicola Thost; Germany	Stine Brun Kjeldaas; Norway	Shannon Dunn-Downing; United States
Women's giant slalom	Karine Ruby; France	Heidi Maria Renoth; Germany	Brigitte Köck; Austria

== Speed skating ==
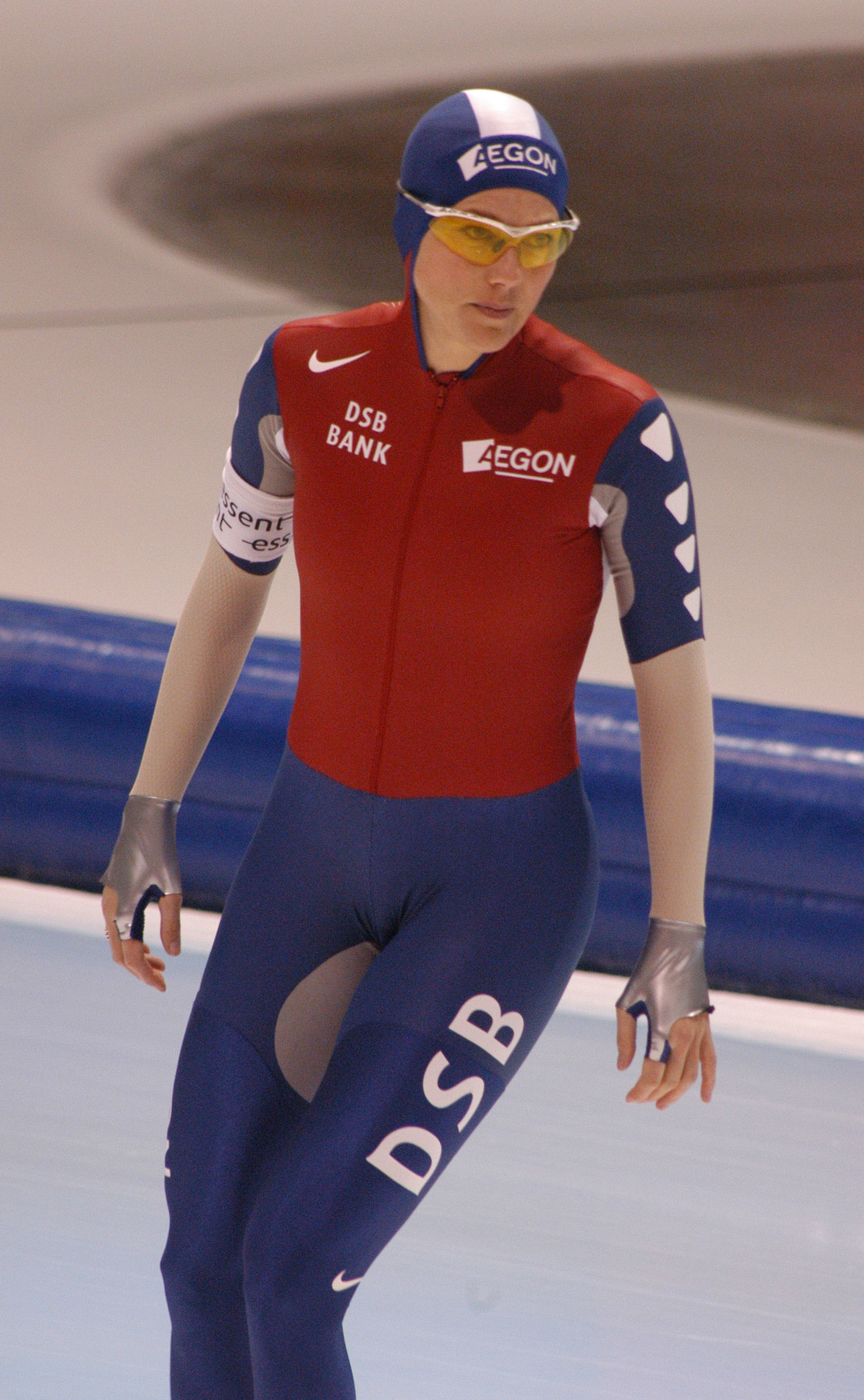
Marianne Timmer won gold in the middle-distance races of 1,000 and 1,500 metres.

Event	Gold	Silver	Bronze
Men's 500 m	Hiroyasu Shimizu; Japan	Jeremy Wotherspoon; Canada	Kevin Overland; Canada
Men's 1,000 m	Ids Postma; Netherlands	Jan Bos; Netherlands	Hiroyasu Shimizu; Japan
Men's 1,500 m	Ådne Søndrål; Norway	Ids Postma; Netherlands	Rintje Ritsma; Netherlands
Men's 5,000 m	Gianni Romme; Netherlands	Rintje Ritsma; Netherlands	Bart Veldkamp; Belgium
Men's 10,000 m	Gianni Romme; Netherlands	Bob de Jong; Netherlands	Rintje Ritsma; Netherlands
Women's 500 m	Catriona Le May Doan; Canada	Susan Auch; Canada	Tomomi Okazaki; Japan
Women's 1,000 m	Marianne Timmer; Netherlands	Christine Witty; United States	Catriona Le May Doan; Canada
Women's 1,500 m	Marianne Timmer; Netherlands	Gunda Niemann-Stirnemann; Germany	Christine Witty; United States
Women's 3,000 m	Gunda Niemann-Stirnemann; Germany	Claudia Pechstein; Germany	Anni Friesinger; Germany
Women's 5,000 m	Claudia Pechstein; Germany	Gunda Niemann-Stirnemann; Germany	Lyudmila Prokasheva; Kazakhstan

== Multiple medalists ==
Athletes who won three or more medals during the 1998 Winter Olympics are listed below.

Athlete	Nation	Sport	Gold	Silver	Bronze	Total
Larisa Lazutina	Russia	Cross-country skiing	3	1	1	5
Bjørn Dæhlie	Norway	Cross-country skiing	3	1	0	4
Olga Danilova	Russia	Cross-country skiing	2	1	0	3
Kazuyoshi Funaki	Japan	Ski jumping	2	1	0	3
Chun Lee-kyung	South Korea	Short track speed skating	2	0	1	3
Katja Seizinger	Germany	Alpine skiing	2	0	1	3
Gunda Niemann-Stirnemann	Germany	Speed skating	1	2	0	3
Uschi Disl	Germany	Biathlon	1	1	1	3
Mika Myllylä	Finland	Cross-country skiing	1	0	2	3
Yang Yang (S)	China	Short track speed skating	0	3	0	3
Rintje Ritsma	Netherlands	Short track speed skating	0	1	2	3

== Notes ==
- ^{a} No bronze medal was awarded in this event because two competitors tied for second place with a time of 1 minute, 35.43 seconds.
- ^{b} No silver medal was awarded in this event because Italy and Canada tied for first place with a time of 3 minutes, 37.24 seconds.

== See also ==
- 1998 Winter Olympics medal table
