= Bobsleigh at the 1998 Winter Olympics =

Bobsleigh at the XVIII Olympic Winter Games
- Venue: Spiral
- Dates: 14–21 February 1998
- Competitors: 156 from 28 nations

Bobsleigh at the 1998 Winter Olympics consisted of two events at Spiral. The competition took place between February 16 and February 23, 1998.

== Medal summary ==
=== Medal table ===
Rank	Nation	Gold	Silver	Bronze	Total
1	Germany	1	0	1	2
2	Canada	1	0	0	1
2	Italy	1	0	0	1
4	Switzerland	0	1	0	1
5	France	0	0	1	1
5	Great Britain	0	0	1	1
Totals (6 entries)		3	1	3	7

Germany led the medal table, with two medals, one gold and one bronze. There had never before been a tie for a medal in Olympic bobsleigh history, but the Nagano Games featured two, one in each event, meaning that three gold medals, and seven medals total, were awarded.

France's bronze medal, as a part of the tie in the four-man event, was the country's first in Bobsleigh at the Olympics.

=== Events ===
Event	Gold		Silver		Bronze	
Two-man	Canada; Pierre Lueders; Dave MacEachern; Italy; Günther Huber; Antonio Tartaglia	3:37.24			Germany; Christoph Langen; Markus Zimmermann	3:37.89
Four-man	Germany; Christoph Langen; Markus Zimmermann; Marco Jakobs; Olaf Hampel	2:39.41	Switzerland; Marcel Rohner; Markus Nüssli; Markus Wasser; Beat Seitz	2:40.01	Great Britain; Sean Olsson; Dean Ward; Courtney Rumbolt; Paul Attwood; France; Bruno Mingeon; Emmanuel Hostache; Éric Le Chanony; Max Robert	2:40.06

== Participating NOCs ==
Twenty-eight nations participated in Bobsleigh at the 1998 Winter Olympic Games.

- Australia (4)
- Austria (8)
- Bosnia and Herzegovina (5)
- Canada (8)
- Czech Republic (5)
- Chinese Taipei (4)
- France (5)
- Great Britain (7)
- Germany (9)
- Greece (4)
- Hungary (4)
- Ireland (5)
- Virgin Islands (6)
- Italy (8)
- Jamaica (6)
- Japan (9)
- Latvia (6)
- Monaco (4)
- Norway (4)
- New Zealand (2)
- Poland (4)
- Puerto Rico (5)
- Romania (6)
- Russia (6)
- Switzerland (10)
- Trinidad and Tobago (2)
- Ukraine (2)
- United States (8)
