= Norway at the 1998 Winter Olympics =

- IOC code: NOR
- NOC: Norwegian Olympic Committee and Confederation of Sports
- Website: www.idrett.no (in Norwegian)

in Nagano
- Competitors: 76 (49 men, 27 women) in 10 sports
- Flag bearer: Espen Bredesen (Ski jumping)
- Medals Ranked 2nd: Gold 10 Silver 10 Bronze 5 Total 25

Winter Olympics appearances (overview)
- 1924; 1928; 1932; 1936; 1948; 1952; 1956; 1960; 1964; 1968; 1972; 1976; 1980; 1984; 1988; 1992; 1994; 1998; 2002; 2006; 2010; 2014; 2018; 2022; 2026

Norway competed at the 1998 Winter Olympics in Nagano, Japan.

== Medalists ==
Medal	Name	Sport	Event
Gold	Hans Petter Buraas	Alpine skiing	Men's slalom
Gold	Ole Einar Bjørndalen	Biathlon	Men's 10 km sprint
Gold	Halvard Hanevold	Biathlon	Men's 20 km
Gold	Bjørn Dæhlie	Cross-country skiing	Men's 10 km (classical)
Gold	Thomas Alsgaard	Cross-country skiing	Men's 15 km pursuit (freestyle)
Gold	Bjørn Dæhlie	Cross-country skiing	Men's 50 km (freestyle)
Gold	Sture Sivertsen; Erling Jevne; Bjørn Dæhlie; Thomas Alsgaard	Cross-country skiing	Men's 4 × 10 km relay
Gold	Bjarte Engen Vik	Nordic combined	Men's individual
Gold	Halldor Skard; Kenneth Braaten; Bjarte Engen Vik; Fred Børre Lundberg	Nordic combined	Men's team
Gold	Ådne Søndrål	Speed skating	Men's 1500 m
Silver	Lasse Kjus	Alpine skiing	Men's downhill
Silver	Ole Kristian Furuseth	Alpine skiing	Men's slalom
Silver	Lasse Kjus	Alpine skiing	Men's combined
Silver	Frode Andresen	Biathlon	Men's 10 km sprint
Silver	Egil Gjelland; Halvard Hanevold; Dag Bjørndalen; Ole Einar Bjørndalen	Biathlon	Men's 4 × 7.5 km relay
Silver	Bjørn Dæhlie	Cross-country skiing	Men's 15 km pursuit (freestyle)
Silver	Erling Jevne	Cross-country skiing	Men's 30 km (classical)
Silver	Bente Martinsen; Marit Mikkelsplass; Elin Nilsen; Anita Moen Guidon	Cross-country skiing	Women's 4 × 5 km relay
Silver	Daniel Franck	Snowboarding	Men's halfpipe
Silver	Stine Brun Kjeldaas	Snowboarding	Women's halfpipe
Bronze	Ann Elen Skjelbreid; Annette Sikveland; Gunn Margit Andreassen; Liv Grete-Skjelbreid-Poirée	Biathlon	Women's 4 × 7.5 km relay
Bronze	Bente Martinsen	Cross-country skiing	Women's 5 km (classical)
Bronze	Anita Moen Guidon	Cross-country skiing	Women's 15 km (classical)
Bronze	Eigil Ramsfjell; Jan Thoresen; Stig-Arne Gunnestad; Anthon Grimsmo; Tore Torvbråten	Curling	Men's tournament
Bronze	Kari Traa	Freestyle skiing	Women's moguls

== Competitors ==
The following is the list of number of competitors in the Games.

Sport	Men	Women	Total
Alpine skiing	7	5	12
Biathlon	5	4	9
Bobsleigh	4	–	4
Cross-country skiing	6	6	12
Curling	5	5	10
Freestyle skiing	0	2	2
Nordic combined	5	–	5
Ski jumping	5	–	5
Snowboarding	4	3	7
Speed skating	8	2	10
Total	49	27	76

== Alpine skiing ==
Men

Athlete	Event	Race 1	Race 2	Total	
Athlete	Event	Time	Time	Time	Rank
Kjetil André Aamodt	Downhill			1:51.72	13
Lasse Kjus	Downhill			1:50.51	2nd place, silver medalist(s)
Lasse Kjus	Super-G			1:36.25	9
Kjetil André Aamodt	Super-G			1:35.67	5
Harald Christian Strand Nilsen	Giant Slalom	DNF	–	DNF	–
Kjetil André Aamodt	Giant Slalom	DNF	–	DNF	–
Lasse Kjus	Giant Slalom	1:21.92	1:18.73	2:40.65	8
Tom Stiansen	Giant Slalom	1:21.40	1:21.48	2:42.88	17
Finn Christian Jagge	Slalom	56.06	55.33	1:51.39	7
Tom Stiansen	Slalom	55.70	55.20	1:50.90	4
Ole Kristian Furuseth	Slalom	55.53	55.11	1:50.64	2nd place, silver medalist(s)
Hans Petter Buraas	Slalom	55.28	54.03	1:49.31	1st place, gold medalist(s)

Men's combined

Athlete	Slalom		Downhill	Total	
Athlete	Time 1	Time 2	Time	Total time	Rank
Kjetil André Aamodt	50.29	44.97	DNF	DNF	–
Finn Christian Jagge	50.22	45.16	DNF	DNF	–
Lasse Kjus	48.09	45.57	1:34.99	3:08.65	2nd place, silver medalist(s)

Women

Athlete	Event	Race 1	Race 2	Total	
Athlete	Event	Time	Time	Time	Rank
Kristine Kristiansen	Downhill			DNF	–
Trude Gimle	Downhill			1:30.87	16
Ingeborg Helen Marken	Downhill			1:30.19	11
Trude Gimle	Super-G			1:19.71	25
Ingeborg Helen Marken	Super-G			1:19.16	19
Kristine Kristiansen	Super-G			1:19.02	17
Ingeborg Helen Marken	Giant Slalom	DNF	–	DNF	–
Kristine Kristiansen	Giant Slalom	1:23.04	1:35.67	2:58.71	22
Andrine Flemmen	Giant Slalom	1:20.04	1:34.90	2:54.94	10
Trude Gimle	Slalom	DNF	–	DNF	–
Andrine Flemmen	Slalom	DNF	–	DNF	–
Trine Bakke	Slalom	47.17	DNF	DNF	–

Women's combined

Athlete	Downhill	Slalom		Total	
Athlete	Time	Time 1	Time 2	Total time	Rank
Trude Gimle	DNF	–	–	DNF	–
Ingeborg Helen Marken	1:30.65	39.00	37.54	2:47.19	13
Kristine Kristiansen	1:30.61	38.49	DNF	DNF	–

== Biathlon ==
Men

Event	Athlete	Misses ^{1}	Time	Rank
10 km Sprint	Egil Gjelland	1	28:49.1	13
10 km Sprint	Halvard Hanevold	2	28:40.8	8
10 km Sprint	Frode Andresen	2	28:17.8	2nd place, silver medalist(s)
10 km Sprint	Ole Einar Bjørndalen	0	27:16.2	1st place, gold medalist(s)

Event	Athlete	Time	Misses	Adjusted time ^{2}	Rank
20 km	Frode Andresen	54:51.0	5	59:51.0	19
20 km	Dag Bjørndalen	57:34.7	1	58:34.7	10
20 km	Ole Einar Bjørndalen	54:16.8	4	58:16.8	7
20 km	Halvard Hanevold	55:16.4	1	56:16.4	1st place, gold medalist(s)

Men's 4 × 7.5 km relay

Athletes	Race		
Athletes	Misses ^{1}	Time	Rank
Egil Gjelland; Halvard Hanevold; Dag Bjørndalen; Ole Einar Bjørndalen	0	1'21:56.3	2nd place, silver medalist(s)

Women

Event	Athlete	Misses ^{1}	Time	Rank
7.5 km Sprint	Gunn Margit Andreassen	4	26:36.2	56
7.5 km Sprint	Ann Elen Skjelbreid	4	25:22.8	37
7.5 km Sprint	Liv Grete Skjelbreid	3	24:44.0	23
7.5 km Sprint	Annette Sikveland	2	24:09.5	15

Event	Athlete	Time	Misses	Adjusted time ^{2}	Rank
15 km	Gunn Margit Andreassen	56:28.5	5	1'01:28.5	40
15 km	Ann Elen Skjelbreid	54:00.3	7	1'01:00.3	34
15 km	Liv Grete Skjelbreid	52:21.2	5	57:21.2	15
15 km	Annette Sikveland	53:38.7	3	56:38.7	8

Women's 4 × 7.5 km relay

Athletes	Race		
Athletes	Misses ^{1}	Time	Rank
Ann Elen Skjelbreid; Annette Sikveland; Gunn Margit Andreassen; Liv Grete Skjelbreid	2	1'40:37.3	3rd place, bronze medalist(s)

^{1} A penalty loop of 150 metres had to be skied per missed target.
^{2} One minute added per missed target.

== Bobsleigh ==
Sled	Athletes	Event	Run 1		Run 2		Run 3		Total	
Sled	Athletes	Event	Time	Rank	Time	Rank	Time	Rank	Time	Rank
NOR-1	Arnfinn Kristiansen; Jørn Stian Dahl; Peter Kildal; Dagfinn Aarskog	Four-man	53.96	18	53.78	15	54.33	17	2:42.07	17

== Cross-country skiing ==
Men

Event	Athlete	Race	
Event	Athlete	Time	Rank
10 km C	Sture Sivertsen	28:10.6	9
10 km C	Erling Jevne	27:58.7	7
10 km C	Thomas Alsgaard	27:48.1	5
10 km C	Bjørn Dæhlie	27:24.5	1st place, gold medalist(s)
15 km pursuit^{1} F	Sture Sivertsen	43:29.2	27
15 km pursuit^{1} F	Bjørn Dæhlie	39:38.8	2nd place, silver medalist(s)
15 km pursuit^{1} F	Thomas Alsgaard	39:37.7	1st place, gold medalist(s)
30 km C	Thomas Alsgaard	DNF	–
30 km C	Bjørn Dæhlie	1'40:18.5	20
30 km C	Sture Sivertsen	1'39:44.9	15
30 km C	Erling Jevne	1'35:27.1	2nd place, silver medalist(s)
50 km F	Tor-Arne Hetland	2'15:21.7	24
50 km F	Anders Eide	2'11:06.9	11
50 km F	Thomas Alsgaard	2'07:21.5	6
50 km F	Bjørn Dæhlie	2'05:08.2	1st place, gold medalist(s)

^{1} Starting delay based on 10 km results.
C = Classical style, F = Freestyle

Men's 4 × 10 km relay

Athletes	Race	
Athletes	Time	Rank
Sture Sivertsen; Erling Jevne; Bjørn Dæhlie; Thomas Alsgaard	1'40:55.7	1st place, gold medalist(s)

Women

Event	Athlete	Race	
Event	Athlete	Time	Rank
5 km C	Trude Dybendahl-Hartz	18:08.0	8
5 km C	Anita Moen-Guidon	18:04.4	7
5 km C	Marit Mikkelsplass	17:53.5	6
5 km C	Bente Martinsen	17:49.4	3rd place, bronze medalist(s)
10 km pursuit^{2} F	Marit Mikkelsplass	30:15.3	14
10 km pursuit^{2} F	Trude Dybendahl-Hartz	29:36.0	11
10 km pursuit^{2} F	Bente Martinsen	29:34.1	9
10 km pursuit^{2} F	Anita Moen-Guidon	29:27.6	8
15 km C	Bente Martinsen	48:19.0	6
15 km C	Trude Dybendahl-Hartz	48:19.0	6
15 km C	Marit Mikkelsplass	48:12.5	5
15 km C	Anita Moen-Guidon	47:52.6	3rd place, bronze medalist(s)
30 km F	Trude Dybendahl-Hartz	DNF	–
30 km F	Maj Helen Sorkmo	1'29:16.9	19
30 km F	Marit Mikkelsplass	1'25:36.9	9
30 km F	Elin Nilsen	1'24:24.5	4

^{2} Starting delay based on 5 km results.
C = Classical style, F = Freestyle

Women's 4 × 5 km relay

Athletes	Race	
Athletes	Time	Rank
Bente Martinsen; Marit Mikkelsplass; Elin Nilsen; Anita Moen-Guidon	55:38.0	2nd place, silver medalist(s)

== Curling ==
=== Men's tournament ===
==== Group stage ====
Top four teams advanced to semi-finals.

Country	Skip	W	L
Canada	Mike Harris	6	1
Norway	Eigil Ramsfjell	5	2
Switzerland	Patrick Hürlimann	5	2
United States	Tim Somerville	3	4
Japan	Makoto Tsuruga	3	4
Sweden	Peja Lindholm	3	4
Great Britain	Douglas Dryburgh	2	5
Germany	Andy Kapp	1	6

Team 1	Score	Team 2
Norway	2–4	United Kingdom
Germany	5–7	Norway
United States	7–6	Norway
Norway	5–3	Japan
Norway	7–4	Sweden
Switzerland	4–5	Norway
Norway	10–8	Canada

==== Medal round ====
Semi-final

Sheet A	1	2	3	4	5	6	7	8	9	10	Final
Norway (Ramsfjell) 🔨	0	0	1	0	1	0	2	0	3	0	7
Switzerland (Hürlimann)	1	0	0	2	0	2	0	2	0	1	8

Bronze medal game

Sheet B	1	2	3	4	5	6	7	8	9	10	Final
United States (Somerville) 🔨	0	0	0	0	0	3	0	1	0	X	4
Norway (Ramsfjell) (bronze)	0	1	1	1	3	0	2	0	1	X	9

Contestants	Skip	Third	Second	Lead	Alternate
Bronze medal	Eigil Ramsfjell	Jan Thoresen	Stig-Arne Gunnestad	Anthon Grimsmo	Tore Torvbråten

=== Women's tournament ===
==== Group stage ====
Top four teams advanced to semi-finals.

Country	Skip	W	L
Canada	Sandra Schmirler	6	1
Sweden	Elisabet Gustafson	6	1
Denmark	Helena Blach Lavrsen	5	2
Great Britain	Kirsty Hay	4	3
Japan	Mayumi Ohkutsu	2	5
Norway 6th	Dordi Nordby	2	5
United States	Lisa Schoeneberg	2	5
Germany	Andrea Schöpp	1	6

Team 1	Score	Team 2
Norway	2–8	Sweden
Norway	6–5	Canada
Norway	4–6	United Kingdom
Norway	6–7	Germany
Japan	8–4	Norway
United States	8–9	Norway
Denmark	8–3	Norway

Contestants

Skip	Third	Second	Lead	Alternate
Dordi Nordby	Marianne Haslum	Kristin Løvseth	Hanne Woods	Grethe Wolan

== Freestyle skiing ==
Women

Athlete	Event	Qualification			Final		
Athlete	Event	Time	Points	Rank	Time	Points	Rank
Kari Traa	Moguls	35.19	22.51	8 Q	32.69	24.09	3rd place, bronze medalist(s)
Hilde Synnøve Lid	Aerials		168.79	5 Q		160.18	6

== Nordic combined ==
Men's individual

Events:

- normal hill ski jumping
- 15 km cross-country skiing (Start delay, based on ski jumping results.)

Athlete	Event	Ski Jumping		Cross-country time	Total rank
Athlete	Event	Points	Rank	Cross-country time	Total rank
Halldor Skard	Individual	186.0	42	DNF	–
Kristian Hammer	Individual	203.5	24	46:07.7	26
Fred Børre Lundberg	Individual	205.0	22	44:32.3	16
Bjarte Engen Vik	Individual	241.0	1	41:21.1	1st place, gold medalist(s)

Men's Team

Four participants per team.

Events:

- normal hill ski jumping
- 5 km cross-country skiing (Start delay, based on ski jumping results.)

Athletes	Ski jumping		Cross-country time	Total rank
Athletes	Points	Rank	Cross-country time	Total rank
Halldor Skard; Kenneth Braaten; Bjarte Engen Vik; Fred Børre Lundberg	901.0	3	54:11.5	1st place, gold medalist(s)

== Ski jumping ==
Athlete	Event	Jump 1			Jump 2		Total	
Athlete	Event	Distance	Points	Rank	Distance	Points	Points	Rank
Roar Ljøkelsøy	Normal hill	74.0	80.0	40	did not advance			
Espen Bredesen	Normal hill	74.5	82.5	36	did not advance			
Henning Stensrud	Normal hill	81.0	96.0	24 Q	81.0	97.0	193.0	23
Kristian Brenden	Normal hill	87.5	112.0	6 Q	84.0	103.5	215.5	8
Henning Stensrud	Large hill	106.5	89.7	38	did not advance			
Kristian Brenden	Large hill	113.0	104.4	24 Q	127.0	130.1	234.5	13
Roar Ljøkelsøy	Large hill	119.5	116.6	7 Q	124.0	125.7	242.3	9
Lasse Ottesen	Large hill	121.0	118.8	5 Q	122.0	120.1	238.9	10

Men's team large hill

Athletes	Result	
Athletes	Points ^{1}	Rank
Henning Stensrud; Lasse Ottesen; Roar Ljøkelsøy; Kristian Brenden	870.6	4

^{1} Four teams members performed two jumps each.

== Snowboarding ==
Men's halfpipe

Athlete	Qualifying round 1		Qualifying round 2		Final	
Athlete	Points	Rank	Points	Rank	Points	Rank
Roger Hjelmstadstuen	35.2	18	31.3	25	did not advance	
Kim Christiansen	38.1	9	37.7	12	did not advance	
Klas Vangen	38.3	7 QF			70.9	15
Daniel Franck	39.6	4 QF			82.4	2nd place, silver medalist(s)

Women's halfpipe

Athlete	Qualifying round 1		Qualifying round 2		Final	
Athlete	Points	Rank	Points	Rank	Points	Rank
Christel Thoresen	24.3	22	24.4	17	did not advance	
Anne Molin Kongsgård	29.3	16	29.2	12	did not advance	
Stine Brun Kjeldaas	37.6	1 QF			74.2	2nd place, silver medalist(s)

== Speed skating ==
Men

Event	Athlete	Race 1		Race 2		Total	
Event	Athlete	Time	Rank	Time	Rank	Time	Rank
500 m	Roger Strøm	36.53	14	36.15	7	72.68	10
500 m	Grunde Njøs	36.32	11	DNF	–	DNF	–
1000 m	Roger Strøm					1:13.58	34
1000 m	Grunde Njøs					1:12.27	14
1500 m	Brigt Rykkje					1:52.91	29
1500 m	Steinar Johansen					1:52.88	28
1500 m	Ådne Søndrål					1:47.87 WR	1st place, gold medalist(s)
5000 m	Remi Hereide					6:39.35	12
5000 m	Lasse Sætre					6:38.95	11
5000 m	Kjell Storelid					6:37.12	8
10,000 m	Remi Hereide					14:09.90	15
10,000 m	Lasse Sætre					13:42.94	7
10,000 m	Kjell Storelid					13:35.95	5

Women

Event	Athlete	Race 1		Race 2		Total	
Event	Athlete	Time	Rank	Time	Rank	Time	Rank
500 m	Edel Therese Høiseth	40.02	23	39.99	20	80.01	20
1000 m	Edel Therese Høiseth					1:19.23	14
1500 m	Anette Tønsberg					2:03.03	17
3000 m	Anette Tønsberg					4:19.24	15
5000 m	Anette Tønsberg					7:28.39	13
