= Switzerland at the 1998 Winter Olympics =

- IOC code: SUI
- NOC: Swiss Olympic Association
- Website: www.swissolympic.ch (in German and French)

in Nagano
- Competitors: 69 (50 men, 19 women) in 12 sports
- Flag bearer: Guido Acklin (bobsleigh)
- Medals Ranked 12th: Gold 2 Silver 2 Bronze 3 Total 7

Winter Olympics appearances (overview)
- 1924; 1928; 1932; 1936; 1948; 1952; 1956; 1960; 1964; 1968; 1972; 1976; 1980; 1984; 1988; 1992; 1994; 1998; 2002; 2006; 2010; 2014; 2018; 2022; 2026

Switzerland competed at the 1998 Winter Olympics in Nagano, Japan.

== Medalists ==
Medal	Name	Sport	Event
Gold	Daniel Müller; Diego Perren; Dominic Andres; Patrick Hürlimann; Patrik Lörtscher	Curling	Men's competition
Gold	Gian Simmen	Snowboarding	Men's halfpipe
Silver	Didier Cuche	Alpine skiing	Men's super-G
Silver	Marcel Rohner; Markus Nüssli; Markus Wasser; Beat Seitz	Bobsleigh	Four-man
Bronze	Michael von Grünigen	Alpine skiing	Men's giant slalom
Bronze	Colette Brand	Freestyle skiing	Women's aerials
Bronze	Ueli Kestenholz	Snowboarding	Men's giant slalom

== Competitors ==
The following is the list of number of competitors in the Games.

Sport	Men	Women	Total
Alpine skiing	10	6	16
Biathlon	1	0	1
Bobsleigh	10	–	10
Cross-country skiing	5	5	10
Curling	5	0	5
Figure skating	1	0	1
Freestyle skiing	0	4	4
Luge	1	0	1
Nordic combined	4	–	4
Ski jumping	4	–	4
Snowboarding	8	4	12
Speed skating	1	0	1
Total	50	19	69

== Alpine skiing ==
Men

Athlete	Event	Race 1	Race 2	Total	
Athlete	Event	Time	Time	Time	Rank
Bruno Kernen	Downhill			DNF	–
Franco Cavegn	Downhill			1:51.74	14
Didier Cuche	Downhill			1:50.91	8
Jürg Grünenfelder	Downhill			1:50.64	4
Paul Accola	Super-G			1:36.87	18
Steve Locher	Super-G			1:36.62	14
Bruno Kernen	Super-G			1:36.37	11
Didier Cuche	Super-G			1:35.43	2nd place, silver medalist(s)
Urs Kälin	Giant Slalom	1:22.00	1:19.17	2:41.17	12
Steve Locher	Giant Slalom	1:21.98	1:18.32	2:40.30	6
Paul Accola	Giant Slalom	1:21.31	1:19.26	2:40.57	7
Michael von Grünigen	Giant Slalom	1:20.98	1:18.71	2:39.69	3rd place, bronze medalist(s)
Marco Casanova	Slalom	DNF	–	DNF	–
Paul Accola	Slalom	57.56	57.35	1:54.91	18
Michael von Grünigen	Slalom	57.33	57.63	1:54.96	19
Didier Plaschy	Slalom	56.67	55.36	1:52.03	12

Men's combined

Athlete	Slalom		Downhill	Total	
Athlete	Time 1	Time 2	Time	Total time	Rank
Jürg Grünenfelder	DNF	–	–	DNF	–
Bruno Kernen	DNF	–	–	DNF	–
Paul Accola	49.39	DNF	–	DNF	–

Women

Athlete	Event	Race 1	Race 2	Total	
Athlete	Event	Time	Time	Time	Rank
Corinne Rey-Bellet	Downhill			1:32.92	30
Catherine Borghi	Downhill			1:31.45	22
Heidi Zurbriggen	Downhill			1:30.25	12
Catherine Borghi	Super-G			1:20.69	34
Corinne Rey-Bellet	Super-G			1:20.31	31
Heidi Zurbriggen	Super-G			1:19.22	21
Sonja Nef	Giant Slalom	DNF	–	DNF	–
Catherine Borghi	Giant Slalom	1:21.90	1:36.52	2:58.42	19
Karin Roten	Giant Slalom	1:20.91	1:36.05	2:56.96	16
Heidi Zurbriggen	Giant Slalom	1:20.31	1:33.30	2:53.61	6
Sonja Nef	Slalom	DNF	–	DNF	–
Karin Roten	Slalom	46.64	DNF	DNF	–
Martina Accola	Slalom	46.37	47.75	1:34.12	7

Women's combined

Athlete	Downhill	Slalom		Total	
Athlete	Time	Time 1	Time 2	Total time	Rank
Catherine Borghi	1:31.24	37.32	36.77	2:45.33	10

== Biathlon ==
Men

Event	Athlete	Misses ^{1}	Time	Rank
10 km Sprint	Jean-Marc Chabloz	DNF	DNF	–

Event	Athlete	Time	Misses	Adjusted time ^{2}	Rank
20 km	Jean-Marc Chabloz	59:41.0	4	1'03:41.0	51

^{1} A penalty loop of 150 metres had to be skied per missed target.
^{2} One minute added per missed target.

== Bobsleigh ==
Sled	Athletes	Event	Run 1		Run 2		Run 3		Run 4		Total	
Sled	Athletes	Event	Time	Rank	Time	Rank	Time	Rank	Time	Rank	Time	Rank
SUI-1	Reto Götschi; Guido Acklin	Two-man	54.71	3	54.77	12	54.44	7	54.35	4	3:38.27	6
SUI-2	Christian Reich; Cédric Grand	Two-man	54.73	4	54.56	4	54.32	5	54.54	7	3:38.15	4

Sled	Athletes	Event	Run 1		Run 2		Run 3		Total	
Sled	Athletes	Event	Time	Rank	Time	Rank	Time	Rank	Time	Rank
SUI-1	Marcel Rohner; Markus Nüssli; Markus Wasser; Beat Seitz	Four-man	53.13	8	53.15	2	53.73	4	2:40.01	2nd place, silver medalist(s)
SUI-2	Christian Reich; Steve Anderhub; Thomas Handschin; Cédric Grand	Four-man	52.88	3	53.47	6	53.93	13	2:40.28	7

== Cross-country skiing ==
Men

Event	Athlete	Race	
Event	Athlete	Time	Rank
10 km C	Patrick Mächler	DNF	–
10 km C	Wilhelm Aschwanden	31:10.5	63
10 km C	Jeremias Wigger	30:33.4	49
10 km C	Beat Koch	28:49.6	17
15 km pursuit^{1} F	Wilhelm Aschwanden	45:32.8	49
30 km C	Beat Koch	1'46:38.3	53
30 km C	Jeremias Wigger	1'39:46.4	16
50 km F	Reto Burgermeister	2'22:28.3	49
50 km F	Wilhelm Aschwanden	2'14:18.0	22
50 km F	Jeremias Wigger	2'13:50.5	18

^{1} Starting delay based on 10 km results.
C = Classical style, F = Freestyle

Men's 4 × 10 km relay

Athletes	Race	
Athletes	Time	Rank
Jeremias Wigger; Beat Koch; Reto Burgermeister; Wilhelm Aschwanden	1'42:49.2	6

Women

Event	Athlete	Race	
Event	Athlete	Time	Rank
5 km C	Andrea Senteler	20:07.5	62
5 km C	Andrea Huber	19:27.6	45
5 km C	Sylvia Honegger	18:29.6	14
5 km C	Brigitte Albrecht	18:16.5	10
10 km pursuit^{2} F	Sylvia Honegger	30:44.3	22
10 km pursuit^{2} F	Brigitte Albrecht	29:34.8	10
15 km C	Sylvia Honegger	50:31.9	22
30 km F	Natascia Leonardi	1'30:31.8	24
30 km F	Brigitte Albrecht	1'25:15.0	7

^{2} Starting delay based on 5 km results.
C = Classical style, F = Freestyle

Women's 4 × 5 km relay

Athletes	Race	
Athletes	Time	Rank
Sylvia Honegger; Andrea Huber; Brigitte Albrecht; Natascia Leonardi	56:55.2	4

== Curling ==
=== Men's tournament ===
==== Group stage ====
Country	Skip	W	L
Canada	Mike Harris	6	1
Norway	Eigil Ramsfjell	5	2
Switzerland	Patrick Hürlimann	5	2
United States	Tim Somerville	3	4
Japan	Makoto Tsuruga	3	4
Sweden	Peja Lindholm	3	4
Great Britain	Douglas Dryburgh	2	5
Germany	Andy Kapp	1	6

Team 1	Score	Team 2
Germany	4–7	Switzerland
Switzerland	10–4	United Kingdom
Switzerland	5–3	Japan
United States	2–7	Switzerland
Canada	8–3	Switzerland
Switzerland	4–5	Norway
Sweden	2–8	Switzerland

==== Medal round ====
Semi-final

Sheet A	1	2	3	4	5	6	7	8	9	10	Final
Norway (Ramsfjell)	0	0	1	0	1	0	2	0	3	0	7
Switzerland (Hürlimann)	1	0	0	2	0	2	0	2	0	1	8

Gold medal game

Sheet C	1	2	3	4	5	6	7	8	9	10	Final
Canada (Harris)	0	0	1	0	0	0	2	0	X	X	3
Switzerland (Hürlimann) (gold)	0	2	0	2	2	3	0	0	X	X	9

Contestants	Skip	Third	Second	Lead	Alternate
Gold medal	Patrick Hürlimann	Patrik Lörtscher	Daniel Müller	Diego Perren	Dominic Andres

== Figure skating ==
Men

Athlete	SP	FS	TFP	Rank
Patrick Meier	22	22	33.0	22

== Freestyle skiing ==
Women

Athlete	Event	Qualification			Final		
Athlete	Event	Time	Points	Rank	Time	Points	Rank
Corinne Bodmer	Moguls	34.04	19.93	20	did not advance		
Evelyne Leu	Aerials		148.72	15	did not advance		
Michèle Rohrbach	Aerials		161.76	10 Q		129.36	11
Colette Brand	Aerials		165.07	7 Q		171.83	3rd place, bronze medalist(s)

== Luge ==
Men

Athlete	Run 1		Run 2		Run 3		Run 4		Total	
Athlete	Time	Rank	Time	Rank	Time	Rank	Time	Rank	Time	Rank
Reto Gilly	50.594	16	50.646	20	51.485	25	50.627	20	3:23.352	22

== Nordic combined ==
Men's individual

Events:

- normal hill ski jumping
- 15 km cross-country skiing (Start delay, based on ski jumping results.)

Athlete	Event	Ski Jumping		Cross-country time	Total rank
Athlete	Event	Points	Rank	Cross-country time	Total rank
Marco Zarucchi	Individual	185.5	43	45:37.9	25
Andy Hartmann	Individual	193.0	38	46:18.5	28
Urs Kunz	Individual	196.0	32	44:53.2	18
Jean-Yves Cuendet	Individual	206.0	21	44:34.6	17

Men's Team

Four participants per team.

Events:

- normal hill ski jumping
- 5 km cross-country skiing (Start delay, based on ski jumping results.)

Athletes	Ski jumping		Cross-country time	Total rank
Athletes	Points	Rank	Cross-country time	Total rank
Marco Zarucchi; Andy Hartmann; Jean-Yves Cuendet; Urs Kunz	797.0	10	56:41.6	7

== Ski jumping ==
Athlete	Event	Jump 1			Jump 2		Total	
Athlete	Event	Distance	Points	Rank	Distance	Points	Points	Rank
Marco Steinauer	Normal hill	66.0	63.5	56	did not advance			
Simon Ammann	Normal hill	75.0	83.5	35	did not advance			
Sylvain Freiholz	Normal hill	76.0	86.0	30 Q	80.5	96.0	182.0	29
Bruno Reuteler	Normal hill	81.0	96.5	23 Q	84.0	103.5	200.0	18
Sylvain Freiholz	Large hill	106.0	88.8	41	did not advance			
Simon Ammann	Large hill	106.0	89.3	39	did not advance			
Marco Steinauer	Large hill	108.0	93.9	33	did not advance			
Bruno Reuteler	Large hill	115.5	105.9	21 Q	120.5	116.4	222.3	19

Men's team large hill

Athletes	Result	
Athletes	Points ^{1}	Rank
Sylvain Freiholz; Marco Steinauer; Simon Ammann; Bruno Reuteler	735.0	6

^{1} Four teams members performed two jumps each.

== Snowboarding ==
Men's giant slalom

Athlete	Race 1	Race 2	Total	
Athlete	Time	Time	Time	Rank
André Grütter	DSQ	–	DSQ	–
Gilles Jaquet	DSQ	–	DSQ	–
Fadri Mosca	DSQ	–	DSQ	–
Ueli Kestenholz	1:00.20	1:03.88	2:04.08	3rd place, bronze medalist(s)

Men's halfpipe

Athlete	Qualifying round 1		Qualifying round 2		Final	
Athlete	Points	Rank	Points	Rank	Points	Rank
Patrik Hasler	32.6	24	32.1	23	did not advance	
Gian Simmen	34.0	21	39.8	3 QF	85.2	1st place, gold medalist(s)
Bertrand Denervaud	37.8	11	35.3	19	did not advance	
Fabien Rohrer	38.5	6 QF			78.7	4

Women's giant slalom

Athlete	Race 1	Race 2	Total	
Athlete	Time	Time	Time	Rank
Steffi von Siebenthal	1:21.93	DNF	DNF	–
Renate Keller	1:19.48	1:12.32	2:31.80	18
Cécile Plancherel	1:15.84	1:08.23	2:24.07	11

Women's halfpipe

Athlete	Qualifying round 1		Qualifying round 2		Final	
Athlete	Points	Rank	Points	Rank	Points	Rank
Anita Schwaller	32.0	9	32.2	7	did not advance	

== Speed skating ==
Men

Event	Athlete	Race	
Event	Athlete	Time	Rank
5000 m	Martin Feigenwinter	6:47.08	21
