= Great Britain at the 1998 Winter Olympics =

- Flag of the United Kingdom
- IOC code: GBR
- NOC: British Olympic Association

in Nagano
- Competitors: 34 (27 men, 7 women) in 7 sports
- Flag bearers: Michael Dixon (opening) (biathlon); Sean Olsson (closing) (bobsleigh)
- Medals Ranked 22nd: Gold 0 Silver 0 Bronze 1 Total 1

Winter Olympics appearances (overview)
- 1924; 1928; 1932; 1936; 1948; 1952; 1956; 1960; 1964; 1968; 1972; 1976; 1980; 1984; 1988; 1992; 1994; 1998; 2002; 2006; 2010; 2014; 2018; 2022; 2026

The United Kingdom of Great Britain and Northern Ireland competed as Great Britain at the 1998 Winter Olympics in Nagano, Japan.

== Medallists ==
| Medal | Name | Sport | Event | Date |
|---|---|---|---|---|
| Bronze | Sean Olsson; Dean Ward; Courtney Rumbolt; Paul Attwood | Bobsleigh | Four-man | 21 February |

== Competitors ==
The following is the list of number of competitors in the Games.

| Sport | Men | Women | Total |
|---|---|---|---|
| Alpine skiing | 4 | 2 | 6 |
| Biathlon | 2 | 0 | 2 |
| Bobsleigh | 7 | – | 7 |
| Curling | 5 | 5 | 10 |
| Figure skating | 1 | 0 | 1 |
| Freestyle skiing | 3 | 0 | 3 |
| Short track speed skating | 5 | 0 | 5 |
| Total | 27 | 7 | 34 |

== Alpine skiing ==
Men

| Athlete | Event | Race 1 | Race 2 | Total | |
| Athlete | Event | Time | Time | Time | Rank |
|---|---|---|---|---|---|
| Andrew Freshwater | Downhill | | | DNF | – |
| Graham Bell | Downhill | | | 1:53.93 | 23 |
| Andrew Freshwater | Super-G | | | 1:39.89 | 33 |
| Graham Bell | Super-G | | | 1:39.80 | 31 |
| Alain Baxter | Giant Slalom | 1:26.29 | 1:23.53 | 2:49.82 | 31 |
| Alain Baxter | Slalom | DSQ | – | DSQ | – |

Men's combined

| Athlete | Slalom | | Downhill | Total | |
| Athlete | Time 1 | Time 2 | Time | Total time | Rank |
|---|---|---|---|---|---|
| Andrew Freshwater | DNF | – | – | DNF | – |
| James Ormond | DNF | – | – | DNF | – |

Women

| Athlete | Event | Race 1 | Race 2 | Total | |
| Athlete | Event | Time | Time | Time | Rank |
|---|---|---|---|---|---|
| Sophie Ormond | Giant Slalom | DNF | – | DNF | – |
| Emma Carrick-Anderson | Slalom | DNF | – | DNF | – |

== Biathlon ==
Men

| Event | Athlete | Misses ^{1} | Time | Rank |
|---|---|---|---|---|
| 10 km Sprint | Mark Gee | 5 | 33:00.3 | 68 |
| 10 km Sprint | Mike Dixon | 0 | 30:34.4 | 47 |

| Event | Athlete | Time | Misses | Adjusted time ^{2} | Rank |
|---|---|---|---|---|---|
| 20 km | Mark Gee | 1'00:46.8 | 7 | 1'07:46.8 | 68 |
| 20 km | Mike Dixon | 1'00:08.0 | 1 | 1'01:08.0 | 33 |

^{1} A penalty loop of 150 metres had to be skied per missed target.
^{2} One minute added per missed target.

== Bobsleigh ==
| Sled | Athletes | Event | Run 1 | | Run 2 | | Run 3 | | Run 4 | | Total | |
| Sled | Athletes | Event | Time | Rank | Time | Rank | Time | Rank | Time | Rank | Time | Rank |
|---|---|---|---|---|---|---|---|---|---|---|---|---|
| GBR-1 | Sean Olsson; Lenny Paul | Two-man | 55.24 | 14 | 55.12 | 18 | 54.85 | 16 | 54.73 | 12 | 3:39.94 | 15 |
| GBR-2 | Lee Johnston; Eric Sekwalor | Two-man | 55.51 | 22 | 55.19 | 19 | 55.16 | 18 | 55.02 | 18 | 3:40.88 | 20 |

| Sled | Athletes | Event | Run 1 | | Run 2 | | Run 3 | | Total | |
| Sled | Athletes | Event | Time | Rank | Time | Rank | Time | Rank | Time | Rank |
|---|---|---|---|---|---|---|---|---|---|---|
| GBR-1 | Sean Olsson; Dean Ward; Courtney Rumbolt; Paul Attwood | Four-man | 52.77 | 2 | 53.58 | 10 | 53.71 | 3 | 2:40.06 | 3rd place, bronze medalist(s) |

== Curling ==
=== Men's tournament ===
==== Group stage ====
Top four teams advanced to semi-finals.

| Country | Skip | W | L |
|---|---|---|---|
| Canada | Mike Harris | 6 | 1 |
| Norway | Eigil Ramsfjell | 5 | 2 |
| Switzerland | Patrick Hürlimann | 5 | 2 |
| United States | Tim Somerville | 3 | 4 |
| Japan | Makoto Tsuruga | 3 | 4 |
| Sweden | Peja Lindholm | 3 | 4 |
| Great Britain 7th | Douglas Dryburgh | 2 | 5 |
| Germany | Andy Kapp | 1 | 6 |

| Team 1 | Score | Team 2 |
|---|---|---|
| Norway | 2–4 | United Kingdom |
| Switzerland | 10–4 | United Kingdom |
| Canada | 10–3 | United Kingdom |
| Sweden | 7–5 | United Kingdom |
| United Kingdom | 9–5 | Japan |
| United Kingdom | 4–7 | Germany |
| United Kingdom | 3–6 | United States |

Contestants

| Skip | Third | Second | Lead | Alternate |
|---|---|---|---|---|
| Douglas Dryburgh | Peter Wilson | Phil Wilson | Ronnie Napier | James Dryburgh |

=== Women's tournament ===
==== Group stage ====
Top four teams advanced to semi-finals.

| Country | Skip | W | L |
|---|---|---|---|
| Canada | Sandra Schmirler | 6 | 1 |
| Sweden | Elisabet Gustafson | 6 | 1 |
| Denmark | Helena Blach Lavrsen | 5 | 2 |
| Great Britain | Kirsty Hay | 4 | 3 |
| Japan | Mayumi Ohkutsu | 2 | 5 |
| Norway | Dordi Nordby | 2 | 5 |
| United States | Lisa Schoeneberg | 2 | 5 |
| Germany | Andrea Schöpp | 1 | 6 |

| Team 1 | Score | Team 2 |
|---|---|---|
| Japan | 5–7 | United Kingdom |
| Denmark | 9–3 | United Kingdom |
| Norway | 4–6 | United Kingdom |
| United Kingdom | 8–5 | United States |
| Canada | 8–3 | United Kingdom |
| United Kingdom | 6–5 | Germany |
| United Kingdom | 5–8 | Sweden |

==== Medal Round ====
Semi-final

| Sheet B | 1 | 2 | 3 | 4 | 5 | 6 | 7 | 8 | 9 | 10 | Final |
|---|---|---|---|---|---|---|---|---|---|---|---|
| Canada (Schmirler) | 0 | 1 | 0 | 1 | 0 | 1 | 0 | 2 | 0 | 1 | 6 |
| Great Britain (Hay) 🔨 | 1 | 0 | 1 | 0 | 0 | 0 | 2 | 0 | 1 | 0 | 5 |

Bronze medal game

| Sheet C | 1 | 2 | 3 | 4 | 5 | 6 | 7 | 8 | 9 | 10 | Final |
|---|---|---|---|---|---|---|---|---|---|---|---|
| Sweden (Gustafson) 🔨 | 2 | 0 | 2 | 0 | 1 | 0 | 4 | 1 | 0 | X | 10 |
| Great Britain (Hay) 4th | 0 | 1 | 0 | 2 | 0 | 2 | 0 | 0 | 1 | X | 6 |

Contestants

| Skip | Third | Second | Lead | Alternate |
|---|---|---|---|---|
| Kirsty Hay | Edith Loudon | Jackie Lockhart | Katie Loudon | Felsie Bayne |

== Figure skating ==
Men

| Athlete | SP | FS | TFP | Rank |
|---|---|---|---|---|
| Steven Cousins | 6 | 7 | 10.0 | 6 |

== Freestyle skiing ==
Men

| Athlete | Event | Qualification | | | Final | | |
| Athlete | Event | Time | Points | Rank | Time | Points | Rank |
|---|---|---|---|---|---|---|---|
| Sam Temple | Moguls | DNF | – | – | – | DNF | – |
| Tim Dudgeon | Moguls | 32.64 | 16.32 | 28 | did not advance | | |
| Kevin Harbut | Aerials | | 168.32 | 20 | did not advance | | |

== Short track speed skating ==
Men

| Athlete | Event | Round one | | Quarter-finals | | Semi-finals | | Finals | |
| Athlete | Event | Time | Rank | Time | Rank | Time | Rank | Time | Final rank |
|---|---|---|---|---|---|---|---|---|---|
| Nicky Gooch | 500 m | 1:08.907 | 4 | did not advance | | | | | |
| Matt Jasper | 500 m | DSQ | – | did not advance | | | | | |
| Nicky Gooch | 1000 m | 1:33.638 | 3 | did not advance | | | | | |
| Matt Jasper | 1000 m | 1:32.709 | 1 Q | 1:31.798 | 2 Q | 1:32.549 | 3 QB | 1:34.285 | 8 |
| Dave Allardice; Nicky Gooch; Matt Jasper; Matthew Rowe; Robert Mitchell | 5000 m relay | | | | | 7:11.955 | 3 QB | 7:06.462 | 7 |
