= Bobsleigh at the 1998 Winter Olympics – Four-man =

Four-man at the XVIII Olympic Winter Games
- Venue: Spiral
- Dates: February 20 — 21, 1998
- Competitors: 128 from 25 nations
- Winning time: 2:39.41

Medalists
1st place, gold medalist(s)		Germany; Christoph Langen, Markus Zimmermann, Marco Jakobs, Olaf Hampel
2nd place, silver medalist(s)		Switzerland; Marcel Rohner, Markus Nüssli, Markus Wasser, Beat Seitz
3rd place, bronze medalist(s)		Great Britain; Sean Olsson, Dean Ward, Courtney Rumbolt, Paul Attwood
3rd place, bronze medalist(s)		France; Bruno Mingeon, Emmanuel Hostache, Éric Le Chanony, Max Robert

The Four-man bobsleigh competition at the 1998 Winter Olympics in Nagano was held on 22 and 23 February, at Spiral. Weather led to the cancellation of the second run on the opening day, meaning the competition had three total runs.

== Results ==
Rank	Country	Athletes	Run 1	Run 2	Run 3	Total
1st place, gold medalist(s)	Germany (GER-2)	Christoph Langen; Markus Zimmermann; Marco Jakobs; Olaf Hampel	52.70	52.90	53.81	2:39.41
2nd place, silver medalist(s)	Switzerland (SUI-1)	Marcel Rohner; Markus Nüssli; Markus Wasser; Beat Seitz	53.13	53.15	53.73	2:40.01
3rd place, bronze medalist(s)	Great Britain	Sean Olsson; Dean Ward; Courtney Rumbolt; Paul Attwood	52.77	53.58	53.71	2:40.06
3rd place, bronze medalist(s)	France	Bruno Mingeon; Emmanuel Hostache; Éric Le Chanony; Max Robert	53.13	53.30	53.63	2:40.06
5	United States (USA-1)	Brian Shimer; Chip Minton; Randy Jones; Garrett Hines	52.93	53.42	53.73	2:40.08
6	Latvia	Sandis Prūsis; Egils Bojārs; Jānis Ozols; Jānis Elsiņš	52.98	53.50	53.78	2:40.26
7	Switzerland (SUI-2)	Christian Reich; Steve Anderhub; Thomas Handschin; Cédric Grand	52.88	53.47	53.93	2:40.28
8	Germany (GER-1)	Harald Czudaj; Torsten Voss; Steffen Görmer; Alexander Szelig	53.12	53.50	53.70	2:40.32
9	Canada (CAN-1)	Pierre Lueders; Ricardo Greenidge; Jack Pyc; Dave MacEachern	53.14	53.44	53.81	2:40.39
9	Austria (AUT-1)	Hubert Schösser; Peter Leismüller; Erwin Arnold; Martin Schützenauer	53.10	53.50	53.79	2:40.39
11	Canada (CAN-2)	Chris Lori; Ian Danney; Matt Hindle; Ben Hindle	53.52	53.69	53.93	2:41.14
12	United States (USA-2)	Jim Herberich; Darrin Steele; John Kasper; Robert Olesen	53.74	53.72	53.81	2:41.27
13	Czech Republic	Pavel Puškár; Peter Kondrát; Pavel Polomský; Jan Kobián	53.61	53.80	53.88	2:41.29
14	Italy (ITA-1)	Günther Huber; Antonio Tartaglia; Massimiliano Rota; Marco Menchini	53.84	53.68	53.91	2:41.43
15	Japan (JPN-1)	Naomi Takewaki; Hiroaki Ohishi; Takashi Ohori; Masanori Inoue	53.73	53.87	53.95	2:41.55
16	Japan (JPN-2)	Toshio Wakita; Yasuo Nakamura; Toshiya Onoda; Shinji Aoto	54.03	53.66	54.28	2:41.97
17	Norway	Arnfinn Kristiansen; Jørn Stian Dahl; Peter Kildal; Dagfinn Aarskog	53.96	53.78	54.33	2:42.07
18	Austria (AUT-2)	Kurt Einberger; Thomas Bachler; Georg Kuttner; Michael Müller	53.92	53.83	54.39	2:42.14
19	Russia	Pavel Shcheglovsky; Aleksey Seliverstov; Vladislav Posedkin; Konstantin Dyomin	53.72	53.95	54.71	2:42.38
20	Italy (ITA-2)	Fabrizio Tosini; Andrea Pais de Libera; Enrico Costa; Sergio Chianella	54.07	54.09	54.86	2:43.02
21	Jamaica	Dudley Stokes; Winston Watt; Chris Stokes; Wayne Thomas	54.41	54.55	54.80	2:43.76
22	Poland	Tomasz Żyła; Dawid Kupczyk; Krzysztof Sieńko; Tomasz Gatka	54.71	54.45	54.63	2:43.79
23	Australia	Jason Giobbi; Scott Walker; Ted Polglaze; Adam Barclay	54.72	54.93	55.23	2:44.88
24	Hungary	Nicholas Frankl; Péter Pallai; Zsolt Zsombor; Bertalan Pintér	55.16	54.82	54.94	2:44.92
25	Bosnia and Herzegovina	Zoran Sokolović; Nihad Mameledzija; Edin Krupalija; Mario Franjić	55.26	55.11	55.30	2:45.67
26	Chinese Taipei	Sun Kuang-ming; Duh Maw-sheng; Chang Mau-san; Cheng Jin-shan	55.30	55.13	55.52	2:45.95
27	Romania	Florian Enache; Marian Chițescu; Iulian Păcioianu; Mihai Dumitrașcu	55.01	55.37	55.68	2:46.06
28	Monaco	Albert, Prince Grimaldi; Pascal Camia; Jean-François Calmes; Gilbert Bessi	55.58	55.70	55.86	2:47.14
29	Virgin Islands	Keith Sudziarski; Christian Brown; Paul Zar; Jeff Kromenhoek	55.80	55.52	55.84	2:47.16
30	Ireland	Jeff Pamplin; Simon Linscheid; Garry Power; Terry McHugh	55.79	55.57	55.87	2:47.23
31	Greece	Greg Sebald; Anastasios Papakonstantinou; Peter Kolotouros; John-Andrew Kambanis	55.94	56.18	56.14	2:48.26
-	Puerto Rico	Liston Bochette; Jorge Bonnet; José Ferrer; Joseph Keosseian	56.45	55.96	DQ	-
