= Chang Mau-san =

Taiwanese bobsledder

Personal information
- Nationality: Taiwanese
- Born: 5 November 1965 (age 59); Hualien, Taiwan

Sport
- Sport: Bobsleigh

Chang Mau-san (born 5 November 1965) is a Taiwanese bobsledder. He competed in the four man event at the 1998 Winter Olympics.
