= Peter Leismüller =

Austrian bobsledder

Personal information
- Nationality: Austrian
- Born: 13 April 1968 (age 56); Innsbruck, Austria

Sport
- Sport: Bobsleigh

Peter Leismüller (born 13 April 1968) is an Austrian bobsledder. He competed in the four man event at the 1998 Winter Olympics.
