= John Kasper (bobsleigh) =

American bobsledder

Personal information
- Born: May 13, 1968 (age 58) Evergreen Park, Illinois, United States

Sport
- Sport: Bobsleigh

John Kasper (born May 13, 1968) is an American former bobsledder. He competed in the four man event at the 1998 Winter Olympics.
