= Vladislav Posedkin =

Russian bobsledder

Personal information
- Nationality: Russian
- Born: 15 August 1970 (age 54); Krasnoyarsk, Russia

Sport
- Sport: Bobsleigh

Vladislav Posedkin (born 15 August 1970) is a Russian bobsledder. He competed in the four man event at the 1998 Winter Olympics.
