= Duh Maw-sheng =

Taiwanese bobsledder

Personal information
- Nationality: Taiwanese
- Born: 1 May 1973 (age 51)

Sport
- Sport: Bobsleigh

Duh Maw-sheng (born 1 May 1973) is a Taiwanese bobsledder. He competed in the four man event at the 1998 Winter Olympics.
