= Ian Danney =

Canadian bobsledder

Personal information
- Nationality: Canadian
- Born: 30 December 1969 (age 55); Georgetown, Guyana

Sport
- Sport: Bobsleigh

Ian Danney (born 30 December 1969) is a Canadian former bobsledder. He competed in the four man event at the 1998 Winter Olympics.
