= Sergio Chianella =

Italian bobsledder (born 1968)

Personal information
- Nationality: Italian
- Born: 12 March 1968 (age 57); Terni, Italy

Sport
- Sport: Bobsleigh

Sergio Chianella (born 12 March 1968) is an Italian bobsledder. He competed in the four man event at the 1998 Winter Olympics.
