= Toshiya Onoda =

Japanese bobsledder (born 1970)

Personal information
- Nationality: Japanese
- Born: 20 November 1970 (age 54); Yuasa, Wakayama, Japan

Sport
- Sport: Bobsleigh

Toshiya Onoda (小野田 稔也, Onoda Toshiya, born 20 November 1970) is a Japanese bobsledder. He competed in the four man event at the 1998 Winter Olympics.
