= Georg Kuttner =

Austrian bobsledder

Personal information
- Nationality: Austrian
- Born: 23 February 1968 (age 57); Gmünd, Austria

Sport
- Sport: Bobsleigh

Georg Kuttner (born 23 February 1968) is an Austrian former bobsledder. He competed in the four man event at the 1998 Winter Olympics.
