= Beat Koch =

Swiss cross-country skier

Personal information
- Nationality: Switzerland
- Born: 27 July 1972 (age 53) Langnau im Emmental, Switzerland

Sport
- Sport: Skiing
- Club: SC Marbach

World Cup career
- Seasons: 1994, 1996–2006
- Indiv. starts: 36
- Indiv. podiums: 0
- Team starts: 11
- Team podiums: 0
- Overall titles: 0 – (85th in 1999)
- Discipline titles: 0

Beat Koch (born 27 July 1972) is a Swiss cross-country skier who competed from 1993 to 2006. Competing at the 1998 Winter Olympics in Nagano, he finished sixth overall in the 4 × 10 km relay and 17th individually in the 10 km events as his best finishes.

Koch's best finish at the FIS Nordic World Ski Championships was 16th in the 30 km event at Val di Fiemme in 2003. His best World Cup finish was 17th in a 15 km event in Germany in 2003.

Koch earned thirteen career victories in lesser events up to 30 km from 1997 to 2003.

== World Cup results ==
All results are sourced from the International Ski Federation (FIS).

=== World Cup standings ===
Season	Age	Season standings				
Season	Age	Overall	Distance	Long Distance	Middle Distance	Sprint
1994	22	NC	—N/a	—N/a	—N/a	—N/a
1996	24	NC	—N/a	—N/a	—N/a	—N/a
1997	25	96	—N/a	61	—N/a	DNP
1998	26	NC	—N/a	NC	—N/a	DNP
1999	27	85	—N/a	57	—N/a	DNP
2000	28	NC	—N/a	NC	NC	DNP
2001	29	NC	—N/a	—N/a	—N/a	DNP
2002	30	NC	—N/a	—N/a	—N/a	DNP
2003	31	92	—N/a	—N/a	—N/a	DNP
2004	32	NC	NC	—N/a	—N/a	DNP
2005	33	157	100	—N/a	—N/a	DNP
2006	34	NC	NC	—N/a	—N/a	DNP
