= Peter Kildal (bobsleigh) =

Norwegian bobsledder

Personal information
- Nationality: Norwegian
- Born: 1 July 1975 (age 50) Lørenskog, Norway

Sport
- Sport: Bobsleigh

Peter Kildal (born 1 July 1975) is a Norwegian former bobsledder. He competed in the four man event at the 1998 Winter Olympics.
