= Jørn Stian Dahl =

Norwegian bobsledder (born 1973)

Personal information
- Nationality: Norwegian
- Born: 5 January 1973 (age 53) Tønsberg, Norway

Sport
- Sport: Bobsleigh

Jørn Stian Dahl (born 5 January 1973) is a Norwegian bobsledder. He competed in the four man event at the 1998 Winter Olympics.
