= Thomas Handschin =

Swiss bobsledder (born 1973)

Personal information
- Nationality: Swiss
- Born: 28 November 1973 (age 51); Winterthur, Switzerland

Sport
- Sport: Bobsleigh

Thomas Handschin (born 28 November 1973) is a Swiss bobsledder. He competed in the four man event at the 1998 Winter Olympics.
