= Andrea Pais de Libera =

Italian bobsledder (born 1973)

Personal information
- Nationality: Italian
- Born: 29 March 1973 (age 52); Auronzo di Cadore, Italy

Sport
- Sport: Bobsleigh

Andrea Pais de Libera (born 29 March 1973) is an Italian bobsledder. He competed at the 1998 Winter Olympics and the 2002 Winter Olympics.
