= Trude Gimle =

Norwegian alpine skier (born 1974)

Personal information
- Born: 2 December 1974 (age 51) Aurskog, Norway

Sport
- Sport: Alpine skiing

Trude Charlotte Gimle (born 2 December 1974) is a Norwegian alpine skier. She was born in Aurskog. She competed at the 1994 and 1998 Winter Olympics .
