= Dagfinn Aarskog (bobsleigh) =

Norwegian bobsledder (born 1973)

Personal information
- Nationality: Norwegian
- Born: 10 February 1973 (age 53) Lørenskog, Norway
- Height: 1.90 m (6 ft 3 in)
- Weight: 98 kg (216 lb)

Sport
- Sport: Bobsleigh

Dagfinn Sverre Aarskog (born 10 February 1973) is a Norwegian bobsledder. He competed in the four-man competition at the 1998 Winter Olympics.
