= Kristine Kristiansen =

Norwegian alpine skier (born 1975)

Kristine Kristiansen (born November 19, 1975) is a Norwegian alpine skier.

She was born in Oslo. She competed at the 2012 Winter Youth Olympics, later competed at the 1993 Junior World Championships, the 1994 Junior World Championships, the 1998 Winter Olympics and the 1999 World Championships.

She made her FIS Alpine Ski World Cup debut in December 1994 in Lake Louise, where she also collected her first World Cup points with a 30th-place finish. Her first top-15 finish came in Lenzerheide with a 13th place in March 1995, and her first and only top-10 placement came in Cortina d'Ampezzo with a 9th place in January 1998. Her last World Cup outing was in February 2001.
