= Andrew Freshwater =

British alpine skier (born 1973)

Andrew Freshwater (born 31 May 1973) is a British former alpine skier who competed in the 1998 Winter Olympics. Freshwater, along with his brother Duncan, both played shinty for Kincraig.
