= Stine Brun Kjeldaas =

Norwegian snowboarder

Medal record

Women's snowboarding

Representing Norway

Olympic Games
Silver medal – second place	1998 Nagano	Halfpipe

Stine Brun Kjeldaas (born 23 April 1975) is a Norwegian professional snowboarder. She is from Kongsberg, Norway.

== Snowboarding career ==
She won a silver medal in the half-pipe at the 1998 Winter Olympics in Nagano, Japan, and also participated in the 2002 Winter Olympics in Salt Lake City, United States.

== Commentating career ==
She joined the BBC commentary team for the 2010 Winter Olympics.

== Personal life ==
Stine Brun Kjeldaas was married to Dutch snowboarder Cheryl Maas. They have two daughters called Lara and Mila.
