= Max Robert =

French bobsledder

Medal record

Bobsleigh

Olympic Games
Bronze medal – third place	1998 Nagano	Four-man

World Championships
Gold medal – first place	1999 Cortina d'Ampezzo	Four-man

Max Robert (born 9 June 1967) is a French bobsledder who competed during the 1990s. He won a bronze medal in the four-man event (tied with Great Britain) at Nagano in 1998.

Robert also won a gold medal in the four-man event at the 1999 FIBT World Championships in Cortina d'Ampezzo.
