= Éric Le Chanony =

French bobsledder

Medal record

Bobsleigh

Olympic Games
Bronze medal – third place	1998 Nagano	Four-man

World Championships
Gold medal – first place	1999 Cortina d'Ampezzo	Four-man
Bronze medal – third place	1995 Winterberg	Two-man

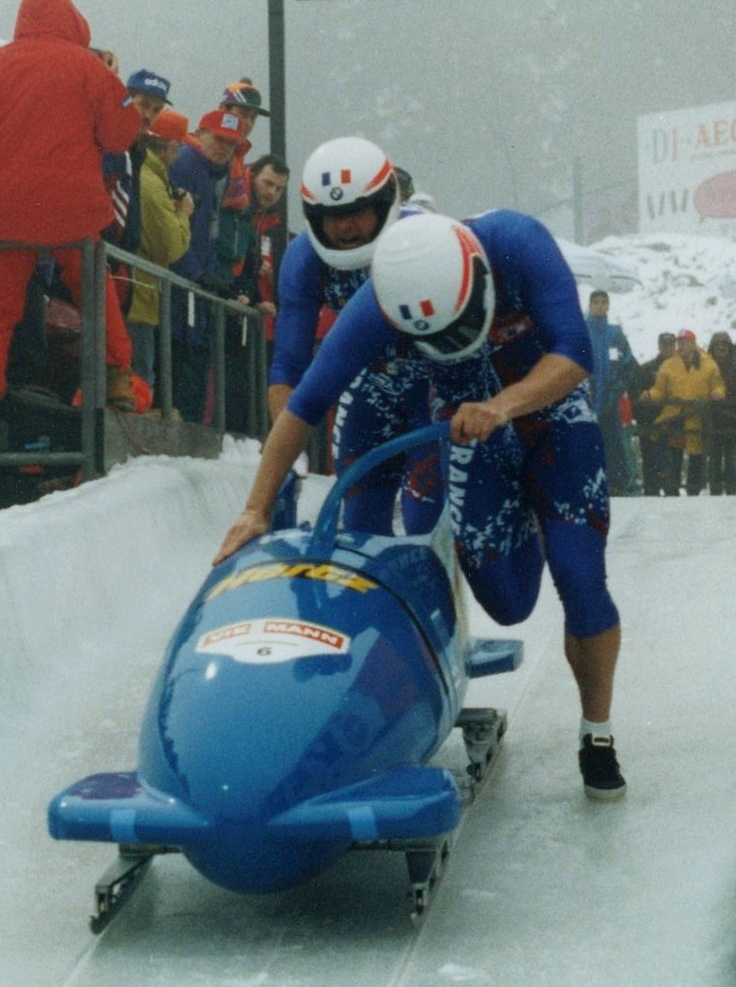

Éric Le Chanony (born February 28, 1968) is a French former bobsledder who competed during the 1990s. He won a bronze medal in the four-man event (tied with Great Britain) at Nagano in 1998.

Le Chanony also won two medals at the FIBT World Championships with one gold (Four-man: 1999) and one bronze (Two-man: 1995).
