= Marco Jakobs =

German bobsledder (born 1974)

Medal record

Men's Bobsleigh

Representing Germany

Olympic Games
Gold medal – first place	1998 Nagano	Four-man

World Championships
Gold medal – first place	2001 St. Moritz	Two-man

Marco Jakobs (sometimes spelled Marco Jacobs, born 30 May 1974 in Unna, North Rhine-Westphalia) is a German bobsledder who competed in the 1990s. At the 1998 Winter Olympics in Nagano, he won a gold medal in the four-man event with teammates Christoph Langen, Markus Zimmermann and Olaf Hampel.

Jakobs also won a gold medal in the two-man event at the 2001 FIBT World Championships in St. Moritz.
