= Emmanuel Hostache =

French bobsledder

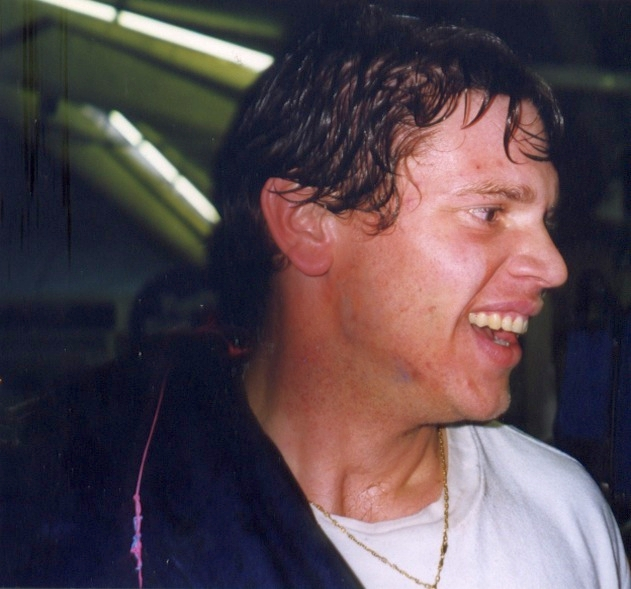
- Undated picture of Hostache.
Medal record
Bobsleigh
Olympic Games
Bronze medal – third place	1998 Nagano	Four-man
World Championships
Gold medal – first place	1999 Cortina d'Ampezzo	Four-man
Bronze medal – third place	1999 Cortina d'Ampezzo	Two-man

Emmanuel Hostache (sometimes shown as Emanuel Hostache, 18 July 1975 in La Mure, Isère – 30 May 2007) was a French bobsledder who competed from 1991 to 2000. Competing in two Winter Olympics, he won a bronze medal in the four-man event (tied with Great Britain) at Nagano in 1998. Hostache was born at La Mure, in south-eastern France.

At the 1999 FIBT World Championships in Cortina d'Ampezzo, Hostache won a gold in the four-man event and a bronze in the two-man event.

Prior to being a bobsledder, Hostache also competed as a track and field athlete in the shot put and discus throw events.

Hostache died of Ewing's sarcoma in 2007 after fighting the disease for eight years.

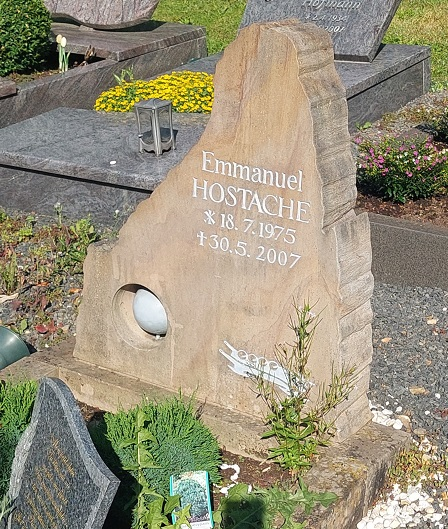
Grab E.Hostache Burbach/Wahlbach
