= Courtney Rumbolt =

British bobsledder (born 1969)

Personal information
- Nationality: British
- Born: 26 July 1969 (age 57) London, Great Britain
Medal record
Representing Great Britain
Olympic Games
Bobsleigh
Bronze medal – third place	1998 Nagano	Four-man
Men's Athletics
World Junior Championships
Bronze medal – third place	1988 Sudbury	4×100 m

Courtney Rumbolt (born 26 July 1969) is a British bobsledder who competed during the 1990s. He won a bronze medal in the four-man event at Nagano in 1998.
