= Dean Ward (bobsleigh) =

British bobsledder (born 1963)

Olympic medal record

Bobsleigh
Bronze medal – third place	1998 Nagano	Four-man

Dean Ward (born 30 June 1963 in Portsmouth, England) is a British bobsledder who competed from 1991 to 2002. Competing in three Winter Olympics, he won a bronze medal in the four-man event (tied with France) at Nagano in 1998. Ward made his first appearance in the media when he was filmed by the BBC 1 for their 1982 documentary, The Paras, which charted the progress of young recruits attempting to become members of the Parachute Regiment on the eve of the Falklands War.
