= Markus Nüssli =

Swiss bobsledder (born 1971)

Medal record

Men's Bobsleigh

Representing Switzerland

Olympic Games
Silver medal – second place	1998 Nagano	Four-man

World Championships
Silver medal – second place	1999 Cortina d'Ampezzo	Four-man

Markus Nüssli (born 9 July 1971) is a Swiss bobsledder who competed in the 1990s. At the 1998 Winter Olympics in Nagano, he won a silver medal in the four-man event with teammates Marcel Rohner, Markus Wasser and Beat Seitz.

Nüssli also won a silver medal in the four-man event at the 1999 FIBT World Championships in Cortina d'Ampezzo.
