= Beat Seitz =

Swiss bobsledder (born 1973)

Olympic medal record

Men's Bobsleigh

Representing Switzerland
Silver medal – second place	1998 Nagano	Four-man

Beat Seitz (born 28 October 1973) is a Swiss bobsledder who competed in the 1990s. At the 1998 Winter Olympics in Nagano, he won a silver medal in the four-man event with teammates Marcel Rohner, Markus Nüssli and Markus Wasser.
