= Marcel Rohner (bobsledder) =

Swiss bobsledder (born 1964)

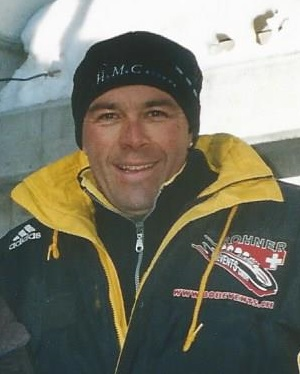

Medal record

Men's bobsleigh

Representing Switzerland

Olympic Games
| Silver medal – second place | 1998 Nagano | Four-man |

World Championships
| Silver medal – second place | 1996 Calgary | Four-man |
| Silver medal – second place | 1999 Cortina d'Ampezzo | Four-man |

World Cup Championships
| Gold medal – first place | 1996-97 | Four-man |
| Gold medal – first place | 1999-00 | Combined |
| Gold medal – first place | 1999-00 | Four-man |
| Silver medal – second place | 1997-98 | Four-man |
| Silver medal – second place | 1998-99 | Four-man |
| Bronze medal – third place | 1999-00 | Two-man |

Marcel Rohner (sometimes shown as Marcel Röhner; born 21 June 1964, in Baar, Switzerland) is a Swiss bobsledder who competed in the 1990s. At the 1998 Winter Olympics in Nagano, he won a silver medal in the four-man event with teammates Markus Nüssli, Markus Wasser and Beat Seitz.

Rohner also won two silver medals in the four-man event at the FIBT World Championships, earning them in 1996 and 1999.

In Bobsleigh World Cup, he won the four-man event both in 1996-97 and in 1999-2000, and the combined men's event in 1999-2000.

His son Timo has also represented Switzerland in bobsleigh at the Olympics.
