= David MacEachern =

Canadian bobsledder (born 1967)

Medal record

Men's bobsleigh

Representing Canada

Olympic Games
Gold medal – first place	1998 Nagano	Two-man

World Championships
Silver medal – second place	1996 Calgary	Two-man

David "Eli" MacEachern (born November 4, 1967) was a two-sport athlete from Canada. He was a Canadian bobsledder who competed in the 1990s. Competing in three Winter Olympics, he and Pierre Lueders won the gold medal in the two-man event (shared with Italy) at Nagano in 1998. He was also a soccer player that competed at the university level as well as national competitions. He was born in Charlottetown, Prince Edward Island.

MacEachern also won a silver medal in the two-man event at the 1996 FIBT World Championships in Calgary.

In 2004, David MacEachern was inducted into the PEI Sports Hall of Fame.
