= Paul Attwood =

British bobsledder

Olympic medal record

Bobsleigh
Bronze medal – third place	1998 Nagano	Four-man

Paul Attwood (born 13 December 1969) is a British bobsledder who competed during the 1990s. Competing in two Winter Olympics (1998 and 2002), he won a bronze medal in the four-man event at Nagano in 1998, with a time of 2 minutes, 40.06 seconds.

Attwood was a Royal Marines officer who began competing in bobsleigh whilst serving in the mid nineties.

Paul Attwood Studied for a Degree in Civil Engineering at the University of Plymouth from 1988 to 1991.

== 1998 Olympics ==
Attwood was initially called into the Great Britain 1st team for the four-man bobsleigh when their top pilot, Mark Tout tested positive for anabolic steroids, and was expelled from the team. In turn, Attwood was brought in behind Sean Olsson. The new team went on to steadily improve on previous performances, coming away with a fourth place in the 1997 World Championships, whilst winning medals along the way on the world circuit. At the 1998 Winter Olympics in Nagano, the British team including Attwood dead-heated with the French in order to win the bronze medal and achieve the most successful four-man result for Great Britain in 62 years.
