= Markus Wasser =

Swiss bobsledder (born 1968)

Medal record

Men's Bobsleigh

Representing Switzerland

Olympic Games
Silver medal – second place	1998 Nagano	Four-man

World Championships
Silver medal – second place	1996 Calgary	Four-man

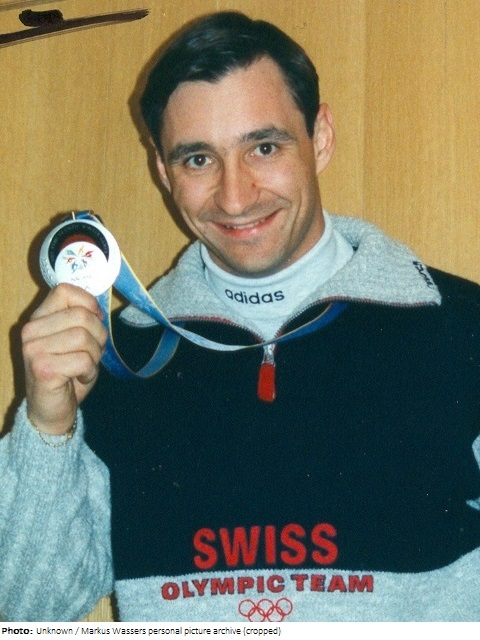
Wasser with his medal

Markus Wasser (born 7 May 1968) is a Swiss bobsledder who competed in the 1990s. At the 1998 Winter Olympics in Nagano, he won a silver medal in the four-man event with teammates Marcel Rohner, Markus Nüssli and Beat Seitz.

Wasser also won a silver medal in the four-man event at the 1996 FIBT World Championships in Calgary.
