= Sean Olsson =

British bobsledder

Olympic medal record

Bobsleigh
Bronze medal – third place	1998 Nagano	Four-man

Sean Olsson (born 2 March 1967) is a British bobsledder who competed during the 1990s. He won a bronze medal in the four-man event at Nagano in 1998. He continued competing after Nagano albeit having less success, and eventually moved to coaching
