= Finland at the 1998 Winter Olympics =

- IOC code: FIN
- NOC: Finnish Olympic Committee
- Website: sport.fi/olympiakomitea (in Finnish and Swedish)

in Nagano
- Competitors: 85 (51 men, 34 women) in 10 sports
- Flag bearer: Janne Ahonen (ski jumping)
- Medals Ranked 11th: Gold 2 Silver 4 Bronze 6 Total 12

Winter Olympics appearances (overview)
- 1924; 1928; 1932; 1936; 1948; 1952; 1956; 1960; 1964; 1968; 1972; 1976; 1980; 1984; 1988; 1992; 1994; 1998; 2002; 2006; 2010; 2014; 2018; 2022; 2026

Finland was represented at the 1998 Winter Olympics in Nagano, Japan by the Finnish Olympic Committee.

In total, 85 athletes including 51 men and 34 women represented Finland in 10 different sports including alpine skiing, biathlon, cross-country skiing, figure skating, freestyle skiing, ice hockey, Nordic combined, ski jumping, snowboarding and speed skating.

Finland won a total of 12 medals at the games including two gold, four silver and six bronze. Three of the medals came in cross-country skiing, two each in freestyle skiing, ice hockey, Nordic combined and Ski jumping and one in biathlon. Cross-country skier Mika Myllylä was the most successful Finnish athlete at the games, winning one gold and two bronze medals.

== Competitors ==
In total, 85 athletes represented Finland at the 1998 Winter Olympics in Nagano, Japan across 10 different sports.

Sport	Men	Women	Total
Alpine skiing	3	2	5
Biathlon	5	2	7
Cross-country skiing	5	6	11
Figure skating	0	1	1
Freestyle skiing	3	1	4
Ice hockey	22	20	42
Nordic combined	4	–	4
Ski jumping	4	–	4
Snowboarding	4	2	6
Speed skating	1	0	1
Total	51	34	85

== Medalists ==
Finland won a total of 12 medals at the games including two gold, four silver and six bronze.

Medal	Name	Sport	Event	Date
Gold	Mika Myllylä	Cross-country skiing	Men's 30 kilometre classical	9 February
Gold	Jani Soininen	Ski jumping	Normal hill individual	11 February
Silver	Janne Lahtela	Freestyle skiing	Men's moguls	11 February
Silver	Samppa Lajunen	Nordic combined	Individual	14 February
Silver	Jani Soininen	Ski jumping	Large hill individual	15 February
Silver	Samppa Lajunen; Hannu Manninen; Jari Mantila; Tapio Nurmela	Nordic combined	Team	20 February
Bronze	Sami Mustonen	Freestyle skiing	Men's moguls	11 February
Bronze	Mika Myllylä	Cross-country skiing	Men's 10 kilometre classical	12 February
Bronze	Finland women's national ice hockey team: Sari Fisk; Kirsi Hänninen; Satu Huotari; Marianne Ihalainen; Johanna Ikonen; Sari Krooks; Emma Laaksonen; Sanna Lankosaari; Katja Lehto; Marika Lehtimäki; Marja-Helena Pälvilä; Tuula Puputti; Karoliina Rantamäki; Katja Riipi; Päivi Salo; Maria Selin; Liisa-Maria Sneck; Petra Vaarakallio; Riikka Nieminen; Tiia Reima	Ice hockey	Women's tournament	17 February
Bronze	Jari Isometsä; Harri Kirvesniemi; Mika Myllylä; Sami Repo	Cross-country skiing	Men's 4 × 10 kilometre relay	18 February
Bronze	Ville Räikkönen	Biathlon	Men's sprint	18 February
Bronze	Finland men's national ice hockey team: Aki-Petteri Berg; Tuomas Grönman; Raimo Helminen; Sami Kapanen; Saku Koivu; Jari Kurri; Janne Laukkanen; Antti Törmänen; Jere Lehtinen; Juha Lind; Jyrki Lumme; Jarmo Myllys; Mika Nieminen; Janne Niinimaa; Teppo Numminen; Juha Ylönen; Ville Peltonen; Kimmo Rintanen; Teemu Selänne; Ari Sulander; Jukka Tammi; Esa Tikkanen; Kimmo Timonen	Ice hockey	Men's tournament	21 February

== Alpine skiing ==
In total, five Finnish athletes participated in the alpine skiing events – Mika Marila, Kalle Palander, Tanja Poutiainen, Henna Raita and Sami Uotila.

Athlete	Event	Race 1	Race 2	Total	
Athlete	Event	Time	Time	Time	Rank
Mika Marila	Men's giant slalom	DNF	–	DNF	–
Kalle Palander	Men's giant slalom	1:24.02	DNF	DNF	–
Sami Uotila	Men's giant slalom	1:23.43	1:20.02	2:43.45	19
Sami Uotila	Men's slalom	DNF	–	DNF	–
Mika Marila	Men's slalom	DNF	–	DNF	–
Kalle Palander	Men's slalom	56.37	55.44	1:51.81	9
Henna Raita	Women's giant Slalom	DNF	–	DNF	–
Tanja Poutiainen	Women's giant Slalom	1:24.90	1:36.76	3:01.66	26
Tanja Poutiainen	Women's slalom	48.06	49.45	1:37.51	18
Henna Raita	Women's slalom	47.18	DNF	DNF	–

Athlete	Slalom		Downhill	Total	
Athlete	Time 1	Time 2	Time	Total time	Rank
Kalle Palander	DNF	–	–	DNF	–

== Biathlon ==
In total, seven Finnish athletes participated in the biathlon events – Harri Eloranta, Vesa Hietalahti, Katja Holanti, Mari Lampinen, Olli-Pekka Peltola, Paavo Puurunen and Ville Räikkönen.

Event	Athlete	Misses ^{1}	Time	Rank
10 km Sprint	Harri Eloranta	2	29:21.8	20
10 km Sprint	Paavo Puurunen	0	28:44.0	9
10 km Sprint	Ville Räikkönen	1	28:21.7	3rd place, bronze medalist(s)

Event	Athlete	Time	Misses	Adjusted time ^{2}	Rank
20 km	Vesa Hietalahti	DNF	–	DNF	–
20 km	Ville Räikkönen	57:25.3	3	1'00:25.3	27
20 km	Paavo Puurunen	57:11.7	3	1'00:11.7	23

Athletes	Race		
Athletes	Misses ^{1}	Time	Rank
Ville Räikkönen; Paavo Puurunen; Harri Eloranta; Olli-Pekka Peltola	2	1'25:01.4	8

Event	Athlete	Misses ^{1}	Time	Rank
7.5 km Sprint	Katja Holanti	2	25:46.2	46
7.5 km Sprint	Mari Lampinen	0	23:55.2	8

Event	Athlete	Time	Misses	Adjusted time ^{2}	Rank
15 km	Katja Holanti	58:50.9	3	1'01:50.9	45
15 km	Mari Lampinen	55:55.2	5	1'00:55.2	32

^{1} A penalty loop of 150 metres had to be skied per missed target.
^{2} One minute added per missed target.

== Cross-country skiing ==
In total, 11 Finnish athletes participated in the cross-country skiing events – Juha Alm, Jari Isometsä, Milla Jauho, Harri Kirvesniemi, Mika Myllylä, Anita Nyman, Kati Pulkkinen, Tuulikki Pyykkönen, Sami Repo, Satu Salonen and Kati Sundqvist-Venäläinen.

Event	Athlete	Race	
Event	Athlete	Time	Rank
Men's 10 km C	Sami Repo	28:51.3	18
Men's 10 km C	Jari Isometsä	28:36.7	15
Men's 10 km C	Harri Kirvesniemi	28:22.5	13
Men's 10 km C	Mika Myllylä	27:40.1	3rd place, bronze medalist(s)
Men's 15 km pursuit^{1} F	Sami Repo	42:38.9	20
Men's 15 km pursuit^{1} F	Jari Isometsä	40:55.4	8
Men's 15 km pursuit^{1} F	Mika Myllylä	40:26.6	6
Men's 30 km C	Sami Repo	1'42:16.8	34
Men's 30 km C	Harri Kirvesniemi	1'37:45.9	6
Men's 30 km C	Jari Isometsä	1'36:51.4	4
Men's 30 km C	Mika Myllylä	1;33:55.8	1st place, gold medalist(s)
Men's 50 km F	Juha Alm	2'25:00.2	54
Men's 4 × 10 km relay	Harri Kirvesniemi; Mika Myllylä; Sami Repo; Jari Isometsä	1'42:15.5	3rd place, bronze medalist(s)
Women's 5 km C	Kati Pulkkinen	19:48.0	57
Women's 5 km C	Anita Nyman	19:45.0	56
Women's 5 km C	Satu Salonen	18:43.4	18
Women's 5 km C	Tuulikki Pyykkönen	18:42.8	17
Women's 10 km pursuit^{2} F	Kati Pulkkinen	33:43.5	51
Women's 10 km pursuit^{2} F	Anita Nyman	32:53.7	44
Women's 10 km pursuit^{2} F	Satu Salonen	30:32.0	16
Women's 15 km C	Kati Sundqvist-Venäläinen	52:14.1	41
Women's 15 km C	Milla Jauho	51:38.6	31
Women's 15 km C	Satu Salonen	49:27.6	18
Women's 15 km C	Tuulikki Pyykkönen	49:13.5	12
Women's 30 km F	Milla Jauho	1'35:39.2	50
Women's 4 × 5 km relay	Tuulikki Pyykkönen; Milla Jauho; Satu Salonen; Anita Nyman	57:34.3	7

^{1} Starting delay based on 10 km results.
^{2} Starting delay based on 5 km results.
C = Classical style, F = Freestyle

== Figure skating ==
In total, one Finnish athlete participated in the figure skating events – Alisa Drei in the women's singles.

Athlete	SP	FS	TFP	Rank
Alisa Drei	20	19	29.0	21

== Freestyle skiing ==
In total, four Finnish athletes participated in the freestyle skiing events – Janne Lahtela, Lauri Lassila and Sami Mustonen in the men's moguls and Minna Karhu in the women's moguls.

Athlete	Event	Qualification			Final		
Athlete	Event	Time	Points	Rank	Time	Points	Rank
Lauri Lassila	Men's moguls	29.03	24.53	9 Q	26.17	25.43	5
Sami Mustonen	Men's moguls	27.47	25.16	3 Q	26.77	25.76	3rd place, bronze medalist(s)
Janne Lahtela	Men's moguls	27.58	25.43	2 Q	25.30	26.00	2nd place, silver medalist(s)
Minna Karhu	Women's moguls	35.40	22.39	10 Q	33.65	23.83	6

== Ice hockey ==
In total, 42 Finnish athletes participated in the ice hockey events – Aki-Petteri Berg, Tuomas Grönman, Raimo Helminen, Sami Kapanen, Saku Koivu, Jari Kurri, Janne Laukkanen, Jere Lehtinen, Juha Lind, Jyrki Lumme, Jarmo Myllys, Mika Nieminen, Janne Niinimaa, Teppo Numminen, Ville Peltonen, Kimmo Rintanen, Teemu Selänne, Ari Sulander, Jukka Tammi, Esa Tikkanen, Kimmo Timonen, Antti Törmänen and Juha Ylönen in the men's competition and Sari Fisk, Kirsi Hänninen, Satu Huotari, Marianne Ihalainen, Johanna Ikonen, Sari Krooks, Emma Laaksonen, Sanna Lankosaari, Katja Lehto, Marika Lehtimäki, Riikka Nieminen, Marja-Helena Pälvilä, Tuula Puputti, Karoliina Rantamäki, Tiia Reima, Katja Riipi, Päivi Salo, Maria Selin, Liisa-Maria Sneck and Petra Vaarakallio in the women's competition.

Pos	Team	Pld	W	D	L	GF	GA	GD	Pts	Qualification
1	Russia	3	3	0	0	15	6	+9	6	Quarterfinals
2	Czech Republic	3	2	0	1	12	4	+8	4	Quarterfinals
3	Finland	3	1	0	2	11	9	+2	2	Quarterfinals
4	Kazakhstan	3	0	0	3	6	25	−19	0	Quarterfinals

Source: Olympedia

Team 1	Score	Team 2
Czech Republic	3–0	Finland
Russia	4–3	Finland
Finland	8–2	Kazakhstan

Quarter-final

Team 1	Score	Team 2
Sweden	1–2	Finland

Semi-final

Team 1	Score	Team 2
Russia	7–4	Finland

Bronze medal match

Team 1	Score	Team 2
Canada	2–3	Finland

Pos	Team	Pld	W	D	L	GF	GA	GD	Pts	Qualification
1	United States	5	5	0	0	33	7	+26	10	Gold medal game
2	Canada	5	4	0	1	28	12	+16	8	Gold medal game
3	Finland	5	3	0	2	27	10	+17	6	Bronze medal game
4	China	5	2	0	3	10	15	−5	4	Bronze medal game
5	Sweden	5	1	0	4	10	21	−11	2	
6	Japan (H)	5	0	0	5	2	45	−43	0	

(H) Hosts

Team 1	Score	Team 2
Sweden	0–6	Finland
Finland	11–1	Japan
United States	4–2	Finland
Finland	2–4	Canada
Finland	6–1	China

Bronze medal match

Team 1	Score	Team 2
Finland	4–1	China

== Nordic combined ==
In total, four Finnish athletes participated in the Nordic combined events – Samppa Lajunen, Hannu Manninen, Jari Mantila and Tapio Nurmela in the individual competition and the team competition.

Athlete	Event	Ski Jumping		Cross-country time	Total rank
Athlete	Event	Points	Rank	Cross-country time	Total rank
Hannu Manninen	Individual	207.0	20	43:51.0	11
Jari Mantila	Individual	212.0	17	46:10.6	27
Tapio Nurmela	Individual	213.5	14	44:31.6	15
Samppa Lajunen	Individual	230.5	6	41:48.6	2nd place, silver medalist(s)

Athletes	Event	Ski jumping		Cross-country time	Total rank
Athletes	Event	Points	Rank	Cross-country time	Total rank
Samppa Lajunen; Jari Mantila; Tapio Nurmela; Hannu Manninen	Team	906.0	1	55:30.4	2nd place, silver medalist(s)

== Ski jumping ==
In total, four Finnish athletes participated in the ski jumping events – Janne Ahonen, Mika Laitinen, Ari-Pekka Nikkola and Jani Soininen in the normal hill individual, large hill individual and the large hill team.

Athlete	Event	Jump 1			Jump 2		Total	
Athlete	Event	Distance	Points	Rank	Distance	Points	Points	Rank
Mika Laitinen	Normal hill	82.5	100.5	17 Q	81.5	98.5	199.0	20
Ari-Pekka Nikkola	Normal hill	83.0	101.5	15 Q	83.5	104.0	205.5	15
Janne Ahonen	Normal hill	86.5	110.0	8 Q	91.5	121.5	231.5	4
Jani Soininen	Normal hill	90.0	118.5	2 Q	89.0	116.0	234.5	1st place, gold medalist(s)
Janne Ahonen	Large hill	106.0	91.3	37	did not advance			
Ari-Pekka Nikkola	Large hill	108.5	94.3	31	did not advance			
Mika Laitinen	Large hill	119.5	114.6	9 Q	115.5	107.9	222.5	18
Jani Soininen	Large hill	129.5	130.6	3 Q	126.5	130.2	260.8	2nd place, silver medalist(s)

Athletes	Result	
Athletes	Points	Rank
Ari-Pekka Nikkola; Mika Laitinen; Janne Ahonen; Jani Soininen	833.9	5

== Snowboarding ==
In total, six Finnish athletes participated in the snowboarding events – Markus Hurme, Sebu Kuhlberg, Aleksi Litovaara and Jussi Oksanen in the men's halfpipe and Minna Hesso and Satu Järvelä in the women's halfpipe.

Athlete	Event	Qualifying round 1		Qualifying round 2		Final	
Athlete	Event	Points	Rank	Points	Rank	Points	Rank
Sebu Kuhlberg	Men's halfpipe	33.4	23	39.7	4 QF	76.6	7
Aleksi Litovaara	Men's halfpipe	39.0	5 QF			71.9	14
Jussi Oksanen	Men's halfpipe	39.7	3 QF			73.6	11
Markus Hurme	Men's halfpipe	41.1	1 QF			73.0	13
Satu Järvelä	Women's halfpipe	31.8	11	32.0	9	did not advance	
Minna Hesso	Women's halfpipe	34.2	5	35.1	3 QF	70.8	6

== Speed skating ==
In total, one Finnish athletes participated in the speed skating events – Janne Hänninen in the men's 500 m and the men's 1000 m.

Event	Athlete	Race 1		Race 2		Total	
Event	Athlete	Time	Rank	Time	Rank	Time	Rank
500 m	Janne Hänninen	36.58	17	36.46	19	73.04	18
1,000 m	Janne Hänninen					1:12.55	21
