= Snowboarding at the 1998 Winter Olympics – Men's halfpipe =

Men's Halfpipe at the XVIII Olympic Winter Games
- Snowboarding
- Venue: Kanbayashi Snowboard Park
- Date: 12 February 1998
- Competitors: 36 from 12 nations
- Winning Score: 85.2

Medalists
1st place, gold medalist(s)		Gian Simmen	Switzerland
2nd place, silver medalist(s)		Daniel Franck	Norway
3rd place, bronze medalist(s)		Ross Powers	United States

The men's halfpipe competition of the Nagano 1998 Olympics was held at Kanbayashi Snowboard Park.

== Results ==
=== Qualifying ===
==== Round 1 ====
The top eight automatically qualified for the final.

Rank	Name	Country	Points	Notes
1	Markus Hurme	Finland	41.1	Q
2	Guillaume Chastagnol	France	40.2	Q
3	Jussi Oksanen	Finland	39.7	Q
4	Daniel Franck	Norway	39.6	Q
5	Aleksi Litovaara	Finland	39.0	Q
6	Fabien Rohrer	Switzerland	38.5	Q
7	Klas Vangen	Norway	38.3	Q
8	Jonathan Collomb-Patton	France	38.2	Q
9	Kim Christiansen	Norway	38.1	
10	Ross Powers	United States	38.0	
11	Bertrand Denervaud	Switzerland	37.8	
12	Íker Fernández	Spain	36.9	
13	Brett Carpentier	Canada	36.3	
14	Tony Vannucci Roos	France	36.2	
15	Shinichi Watanabe	Japan	35.7	
16	Derek Heidt	Canada	35.6	
17	Ingemar Backman	Sweden	35.5	
18	Roger Hjelmstadstuen	Norway	35.2	
19	Max Ploetzeneder	Austria	35.1	
20	Makoto Takagaki	Japan	34.6	
21	Gian Simmen	Switzerland	34.0	
22	Pontus Ståhlkloo	Sweden	33.5	
23	Sebu Kuhlberg	Finland	33.4	
24	Patrik Hasler	Switzerland	32.6	
25	Todd Richards	United States	32.4	
26	Fredrik Sterner	Sweden	32.4	
27	Mike Michalchuk	Canada	32.3	
28	Takashi Nishida	Japan	32.2	
29	Jean Baptiste Charlet	France	31.3	
30	Jacob Söderqvist	Sweden	30.9	
31	Ron Chiodi	United States	29.0	
32	Xaver Hoffmann	Germany	28.3	
33	Sergio Bartrina	Spain	27.5	
34	Łukasz Starowicz	Poland	27.2	
35	Takamasa Imai	Japan	24.4	
36	Trevor Andrew	Canada	24.1	

==== Round 2 ====
The top eight finishers qualified for the final.

Rank	Name	Country	Points	Notes
1	Brett Carpentier	Canada	41.8	Q
2	Mike Michalchuk	Canada	41.4	Q
3	Gian Simmen	Switzerland	39.8	Q
4	Sebu Kuhlberg	Finland	39.7	Q
5	Jean Baptiste Charlet	France	39.6	Q
6	Todd Richards	United States	39.5	Q
7	Ross Powers	United States	39.4	Q
8	Jacob Söderqvist	Sweden	39.2	Q
9	Xaver Hoffmann	Germany	38.2	
10	Íker Fernández	Spain	37.9	
11	Pontus Ståhlkloo	Sweden	37.9	
12	Kim Christiansen	Norway	37.7	
13	Sergio Bartrina	Spain	37.4	
14	Ingemar Backman	Sweden	37.0	
15	Fredrik Sterner	Sweden	36.5	
16	Max Ploetzeneder	Austria	35.9	
17	Tony Vannucci Roos	France	35.8	
18	Derek Heidt	Canada	35.8	
19	Bertrand Denervaud	Switzerland	35.3	
20	Takashi Nishida	Japan	33.4	
21	Trevor Andrew	Canada	32.4	
22	Makoto Takagaki	Japan	32.2	
23	Patrik Hasler	Switzerland	32.1	
24	Ron Chiodi	United States	32.1	
25	Roger Hjelmstadstuen	Norway	31.3	
26	Shinichi Watanabe	Japan	29.1	
27	Łukasz Starowicz	Poland	26.5	
28	Takamasa Imai	Japan	24.4	

=== Final ===
The 16 finalists each competed in two runs, with the total score counting for ranking.

Rank	Name	Country	Run 1	Run 2	Total
1st place, gold medalist(s)	Gian Simmen	Switzerland	43.80	41.40	85.20
2nd place, silver medalist(s)	Daniel Franck	Norway	38.10	44.30	82.40
3rd place, bronze medalist(s)	Ross Powers	United States	40.30	41.80	82.10
4	Fabien Rohrer	Switzerland	36.40	42.30	78.70
5	Guillaume Chastagnol	France	37.80	40.50	78.30
6	Jacob Söderqvist	Sweden	38.30	39.50	77.80
7	Sebu Kuhlberg	Finland	36.80	39.80	76.60
8	Mike Michalchuk	Canada	38.60	37.40	76.00
9	Brett Carpentier	Canada	43.30	32.30	75.60
10	Jonathan Collomb-Patton	France	36.20	39.30	75.50
11	Jussi Oksanen	Finland	33.50	40.10	73.60
12	Jean Baptiste Charlet	France	35.80	37.60	73.40
13	Markus Hurme	Finland	38.90	34.10	73.00
14	Aleksi Litovaara	Finland	32.40	39.50	71.90
15	Klas Vangen	Norway	33.00	37.90	70.90
16	Todd Richards	United States	30.10	39.50	69.60
