= Finland at the 2002 Winter Olympics =

- IOC code: FIN
- NOC: Finnish Olympic Committee
- Website: sport.fi/olympiakomitea (in Finnish and Swedish)

in Salt Lake City
- Competitors: 98 (62 men, 36 women) in 11 sports
- Flag bearer: Toni Nieminen (ski jumping)
- Medals Ranked 8th: Gold 4 Silver 2 Bronze 1 Total 7

Winter Olympics appearances (overview)
- 1924; 1928; 1932; 1936; 1948; 1952; 1956; 1960; 1964; 1968; 1972; 1976; 1980; 1984; 1988; 1992; 1994; 1998; 2002; 2006; 2010; 2014; 2018; 2022; 2026

Finland competed at the 2002 Winter Olympics in Salt Lake City, Utah, United States. The nation won all Nordic combined events, most notably Samppa Lajunen, in the individual events.

== Medalists ==
Medal	Name	Sport	Event	Date
Gold	Janne Lahtela	Freestyle skiing	Men's moguls	12 February
Gold	Samppa Lajunen	Nordic combined	Men's sprint	22 February
Gold	Samppa Lajunen	Nordic combined	Men's individual	10 February
Gold	Jari Mantila; Hannu Manninen; Jaakko Tallus; Samppa Lajunen	Nordic combined	Men's team	17 February
Silver	Jaakko Tallus	Nordic combined	Men's individual	10 February
Silver	Janne Ahonen; Matti Hautamäki; Risto Jussilainen; Veli-Matti Lindström	Ski jumping	Men's team large hill (K120)	18 February
Bronze	Matti Hautamäki	Ski jumping	Men's large hill (K120)	13 February

== Alpine skiing ==
Men

Athlete	Event	Race 1	Race 2	Total	
Athlete	Event	Time	Time	Time	Rank
Sami Uotila	Giant Slalom	DNF	–	DNF	–
Kalle Palander	Giant Slalom	1:14.57	DNF	DNF	–
Kalle Palander	Slalom	DNF	–	DNF	–

Women

Athlete	Event	Race 1	Race 2	Total	
Athlete	Event	Time	Time	Time	Rank
Henna Raita	Giant Slalom	DNF	–	DNF	–
Tanja Poutiainen	Giant Slalom	1:17.31	1:15.66	2:32.97	11
Henna Raita	Slalom	54.75	53.65	1:48.40	8
Tanja Poutiainen	Slalom	52.46	DNF	DNF	–

== Biathlon ==
Men

Event	Athlete	Misses ^{1}	Time	Rank
10 km sprint	Olli-Pekka Peltola	1	28:58.5	73
10 km sprint	Vesa Hietalahti	0	26:43.2	25
10 km sprint	Timo Antila	1	26:33.4	19
10 km sprint	Paavo Puurunen	1	26:24.7	16
12.5 km pursuit ^{2}	Timo Antila	5	36:16.7	32
12.5 km pursuit ^{2}	Paavo Puurunen	3	36:03.5	28
12.5 km pursuit ^{2}	Vesa Hietalahti	1	35:10.0	22

Event	Athlete	Time	Misses	Adjusted time ^{3}	Rank
20 km	Ville Räikkönen	55:34.2	4	59:34.2	67
20 km	Timo Antila	53:33.5	3	56:33.5	41
20 km	Vesa Hietalahti	52:47.0	2	54:47.0	19
20 km	Paavo Puurunen	51:15.7	3	54:15.7	15

Men's 4 × 7.5 km relay

Athletes	Race		
Athletes	Misses ^{1}	Time	Rank
Ville Räikkönen; Timo Antila; Paavo Puurunen; Vesa Hietalahti	1	1'28:52.7	12

Women

Event	Athlete	Misses ^{1}	Time	Rank
7.5 km sprint	Anita Nyman	4	24:17.0	54
7.5 km sprint	Katja Holanti	4	24:07.2	52
7.5 km sprint	Outi Kettunen	1	23:11.3	37
7.5 km sprint	Sanna-Leena Perunka	1	22:39.9	24
10 km pursuit ^{4}	Anita Nyman	DNF	DNF	–
10 km pursuit ^{4}	Katja Holanti	6	37:41.7	46
10 km pursuit ^{4}	Outi Kettunen	4	35:48.6	37
10 km pursuit ^{4}	Sanna-Leena Perunka	1	33:44.5	20

Event	Athlete	Time	Misses	Adjusted time ^{3}	Rank
15 km	Outi Kettunen	49:18.1	4	53:48.1	48
15 km	Sanna-Leena Perunka	49:48.8	3	52:48.8	40
15 km	Katja Holanti	47:52.3	2	49:52.3	13

Women's 4 × 7.5 km relay

Athletes	Race		
Athletes	Misses ^{1}	Time	Rank
Katja Holanti; Sanna-Leena Perunka; Anita Nyman; Outi Kettunen	0	1'34:18.7	12

^{1} A penalty loop of 150 metres had to be skied per missed target.
^{2} Starting delay based on 10 km sprint results.
^{3} One minute added per missed target.
^{4} Starting delay based on 7.5 km sprint results.

== Cross-country skiing ==
Men

Sprint

Athlete	Qualifying round		Quarter finals		Semi finals		Finals	
Athlete	Time	Rank	Time	Rank	Time	Rank	Time	Final rank
Keijo Kurttila	2:56.91	26	did not advance					
Sami Repo	2:55.47	22	did not advance					
Ari Palolahti	2:55.28	21	did not advance					
Hannu Manninen	2:53.87	16 Q	3:02.4	2 Q	3:14.1	4 QB	2:59.5	8

Pursuit

Athlete	10 km C		10 km F pursuit^{1}	
Athlete	Time	Rank	Time	Final rank
Sami Pietilä	28:20.1	47 Q	26:38.8	46
Sami Repo	28:09.2	44 Q	25:29.7	31

Event	Athlete	Race	
Event	Athlete	Time	Rank
15 km C	Ari Palolahti	42:10.7	53
15 km C	Karri Hietamäki	41:13.6	43
15 km C	Kuisma Taipale	39:50.3	30
30 km F	Sami Pietilä	DNF	–
30 km F	Sami Repo	1'16:48.2	40
30 km F	Teemu Kattilakoski	1'16:20.9	35
50 km C	Kuisma Taipale	2'24:40.5	47
50 km C	Karri Hietamäki	2'19:32.0	31
50 km C	Sami Pietilä	2'19:10.7	30

^{1} Starting delay based on 10 km C. results.
C = Classical style, F = Freestyle

4 × 10 km relay

Athletes	Race	
Athletes	Time	Rank
Kuisma Taipale; Karri Hietamäki; Teemu Kattilakoski; Sami Repo	1'37:41.8	11

Women

Sprint

Athlete	Qualifying round		Quarter finals		Semi finals		Finals	
Athlete	Time	Rank	Time	Rank	Time	Rank	Time	Final rank
Riitta-Liisa Lassila-Roponen	3:27.16	36	did not advance					
Kaisa Varis	3:20.52	23	did not advance					
Kati Sundqvist-Venäläinen	3:19.23	18	did not advance					
Elina Pienimäki-Hietamäki	3:14.79	6 Q	4:01.5	4	did not advance			

Pursuit

Athlete	5 km C		5 km F pursuit^{2}	
Athlete	Time	Rank	Time	Final rank
Elina Pienimäki-Hietamäki	14:21.3	43 Q	13:39.5	40
Kati Sundqvist-Venäläinen	13:54.4	21 Q	13:11.9	16
Satu Salonen	13:43.4	11 'Q	13:34.3	36
Kaisa Varis	13:37.9	9 Q	12:37.8	12

Event	Athlete	Race	
Event	Athlete	Time	Rank
10 km C	Annmari Viljanmaa	30:51.8	37
10 km C	Kati Sundqvist-Venäläinen	30:24.0	28
10 km C	Satu Salonen	29:02.3	7
15 km F	Annmari Viljanmaa	DNF	–
15 km F	Riitta-Liisa Lassila-Roponen	42:14.3	19
15 km F	Kaisa Varis	40:04.1	4
30 km C	Satu Salonen	DNF	–
30 km C	Annmari Viljanmaa	1'40:47.9	24

^{2} Starting delay based on 5 km C. results.
C = Classical style, F = Freestyle

4 × 5 km relay

Athletes	Race	
Athletes	Time	Rank
Kati Sundqvist-Venäläinen; Satu Salonen; Riitta-Liisa Lassila-Roponen; Kaisa Varis	50:45.5	7

== Curling ==
=== Men's tournament ===
==== Group stage ====
Top four teams advanced to semi-finals.

Country	Skip	W	L
Canada	Kevin Martin	8	1
Norway	Pål Trulsen	7	2
Switzerland	Andreas Schwaller	6	3
Sweden	Peja Lindholm	6	3
Finland 5th	Markku Uusipaavalniemi	5	4
Germany	Sebastian Stock	4	5
Denmark	Ulrik Schmidt	3	6
(United Kingdom) Great Britain	Hammy McMillan	3	6
United States	Tim Somerville	3	6
France	Dominique Dupont-Roc	0	9

Team 1	Score	Team 2
Denmark	3–9	Finland
Finland	6–7	Germany
Finland	4–9	Canada
Switzerland	5–6	Finland
Finland	6–5	France
United Kingdom	4–6	Finland
Finland	5–6	Norway
Finland	4–11	Sweden
United States	4–6	Finland

Contestants

Finland
Oulunkylä CC, Helsinki

Skip: Markku Uusipaavalniemi
Third: Wille Mäkelä
Second: Tommi Häti
Lead: Jari Laukkanen
Alternate: Pekka Saarelainen

== Figure skating ==
Women

Athlete	Points	SP	FS	Rank
Elina Kettunen	18.0	18	9	11

== Freestyle skiing ==
Men

Athlete	Event	Qualification			Final		
Athlete	Event	Time	Points	Rank	Time	Points	Rank
Tapio Luusua	Moguls	29.81	24.56	15 Q	27.16	26.67	5
Sami Mustonen	Moguls	29.83	25.42	8 Q	28.10	26.08	10
Mikko Ronkainen	Moguls	29.34	26.25	3 Q	28.31	26.49	8
Janne Lahtela	Moguls	27.22	26.92	2 Q	26.55	27.97	1st place, gold medalist(s)

Women

Athlete	Event	Qualification			Final		
Athlete	Event	Time	Points	Rank	Time	Points	Rank
Minna Karhu	Moguls	38.27	22.66	10 Q	37.20	23.07	12

== Ice hockey ==
=== Men's tournament ===
==== First round - Group D ====
Pos	Team	Pld	W	D	L	GF	GA	GD	Pts	Qualification
1	United States (H)	3	2	1	0	16	3	+13	5	Quarterfinals
2	Finland	3	2	0	1	11	8	+3	4	Quarterfinals
3	Russia	3	1	1	1	9	9	0	3	Quarterfinals
4	Belarus	3	0	0	3	6	22	−16	0	Quarterfinals

Source: IIHF
(H) Hosts

15 February 2002; 20:45	Finland	0 – 6 (0–0, 0–3, 0–3)	United States	E Center, West Valley City; Attendance: 8,597

Jani Hurme
Goalies
Mike Dunham
Referee:
(Canada) Bill McCreary
Linesmen:
(Canada) Derek Nansen
(United States) Tim Nowak

0-1	29:45 − Scott Young
0-2	36:16 − John LeClair
0-3	37:45 − Keith Tkachuk
0-4	46:46 − John LeClair
0-5	51:23 − John LeClair
0-6	54:14 − Bill Guerin

10 min
Penalties
10 min

16 February 2002; 16:45	Finland	8 – 1 (3–0, 3–0, 2–1)	Belarus	E Center, West Valley City; Attendance: 8,599

Pasi Nurminen
Goalies
Sergei Shabanov
Andrei Mezin
Referee:
(United States) Dennis LaRue
Linesmen:
(Canada) Mike Cvik
(Slovakia) Rudolf Lauff

Olli Jokinen − 01:30	1-0
Teemu Selänne − 14:53	2-0
Olli Jokinen − 16:24	3-0
Teemu Selänne − 24:55	4-0
Sami Kapanen − 25:43	5-0
Tomi Kallio − 29:26	6-0
	6-1	43:54 − Dmitry Pankov
Aki Berg − 49:21	7-1
Mikko Eloranta − 54:39	8-1

10 min
Penalties
8 min

18 February 2002; 13:30	Russia	1 – 3 (1–0, 0–2, 0–1)	Finland	Peaks Ice Arena, Provo; Attendance: 6,360

Nikolai Khabibulin
Goalies
Jani Hurme
Referee:
(United States) Dennis LaRue
Linesmen:
(Czech Republic) Petr Blumel
(Canada) Jean Morin

Pavel Bure - 07:49	1-0
	1-1	30:57 - Teemu Selänne
	1-2	36:15 - Mikko Eloranta
	1-3	40:33 - Jere Lehtinen

10 min
Penalties
8 min
26
Shots
29

==== Quarter final ====
20 February 2002; 20:15	Finland	1 – 2 (0–1, 1–1, 0–0)	Canada	E Center, West Valley City; Attendance: 8,599

Jani Hurme
Goalies
Martin Brodeur
Referee:
(United States) Dennis LaRue
Linesman:
(Canada) Mike Cvik

	0-1	03:00 - Joe Sakic
	0-2	35:49 - Steve Yzerman
Niklas Hagman - 36:09	1-2

2 min
Penalties
2 min
19
Shots
34

==== Team roster ====
- Head Coach: (Finland) Hannu Aravirta

Pos.	No.	Name	2001-02 team
G	30	Pasi Nurminen	(United States) Atlanta Thrashers
G	31	Jussi Markkanen	(Canada) Edmonton Oilers
G	35	Jani Hurme	(Canada) Ottawa Senators
D	4	Kimmo Timonen	(United States) Nashville Predators
D	5	Sami Salo	(Canada) Ottawa Senators
D	6	Ossi Väänänen	(United States) Phoenix Coyotes
D	7	Aki Berg	(Canada) Toronto Maple Leafs
D	21	Jyrki Lumme	(Canada) Toronto Maple Leafs
D	27	Teppo Numminen	(United States) Phoenix Coyotes
D	44	Janne Niinimaa	(Canada) Edmonton Oilers
F	8	Teemu Selänne	(United States) San Jose Sharks
F	10	Ville Nieminen	(United States) Colorado Avalanche
F	12	Olli Jokinen	(United States) Florida Panthers
F	14	Raimo Helminen	(Finland) Tampereen Ilves
F	16	Niklas Hagman	(United States) Florida Panthers
F	17	Tomi Kallio	(United States) Atlanta Thrashers
F	22	Mikko Eloranta	(United States) Los Angeles Kings
F	24	Sami Kapanen	(United States) Carolina Hurricanes
F	26	Jere Lehtinen	(United States) Dallas Stars
F	36	Juha Ylönen	(United States) Tampa Bay Lightning
F	37	Jarkko Ruutu	(Canada) Vancouver Canucks
F	41	Antti Aalto	(Finland) Jokerit
F	42	Juha Lind	(Sweden) Södertälje SK

=== Women's tournament ===
==== First round - Group B ====
Top two teams (shaded) advanced to semifinals.

Pos	Team	Pld	W	D	L	GF	GA	GD	Pts	Qualification
1	United States (H)	3	3	0	0	27	1	+26	6	Semifinals
2	Finland	3	2	0	1	7	6	+1	4	Semifinals
3	Germany	3	0	1	2	6	18	−12	1	5–8th place semifinals
4	China	3	0	1	2	6	21	−15	1	5–8th place semifinals

Source: TSN
(H) Hosts

All times are local (UTC-7).

12 February 2002; 14:00	Finland	4 – 0 (0–0, 2–0, 2–0)	China	Peaks Ice Arena, Provo; Attendance: 4,977

14 February 2002; 11:00	Finland	3 – 1 (1–0, 2–0, 0–1)	Germany	Peaks Ice Arena, Provo; Attendance: 4,769

16 February 2002; 11:00	United States	5 – 0 (3–0, 1–0, 1–0)	Finland	E Center, West Valley City; Attendance: 8,507

==== Medal round ====
Semi-final

19 February 2002; 11:05	Canada	7 – 3 (2–1, 0–2, 5–0)	Finland	E Center, West Valley City; Attendance: 7,289

Bronze medal game

21 February 2002; 12:10	Finland 4th	1 – 2 (0–2, 1–0, 0–0)	Sweden	Peaks Ice Arena, Provo; Attendance: 6,298

==== Team roster ====
- Head Coach: (Finland) Jouko Lukkarila

Pos.	No.	Name	2001-02 team
G	19	Tuula Puputti	(United States) University of Minnesota Duluth
G	30	Minna-Monica Halonen	(Finland) Tampereen Tappara
D	3	Emma Laaksonen	(United States) Ohio State University
D	5	Pirjo Ahonen	(Finland) Jyväskylän Hockey Cats
D	6	Saija Sirviö	(Finland) Oulun Kärpät
D	9	Terhi Mertanen	(Finland) Espoo Blues
D	20	Kirsi Hänninen	(Finland) Oulun Kärpät
D	22	Päivi Salo	(Finland) Oulun Kärpät
F	8	Marjo Voutilainen	(Finland) Itä-Helsingin Kiekko
F	10	Sari Fisk	(Finland) Tampereen Ilves
F	11	Oona Parviainen	(Finland) Espoo Blues
F	13	Riikka Nieminen	(Finland) Jyväskylän Hockey Cats
F	15	Satu Hoikkala	(Finland) Oulun Kärpät
F	16	Tiia Reima	(Finland) Itä-Helsingin Kiekko
F	21	Petra Vaarakallio	(Finland) Espoo Blues
F	23	Hanne Sikiö	(United States) University of Minnesota Duluth
F	25	Marja-Helena Pälvilä	(Finland) Espoo Blues
F	26	Henna Savikuja	(Finland) Oulun Kärpät
F	28	Katja Riipi	(Finland) Itä-Helsingin Kiekko
F	29	Karoliina Rantamäki	(Finland) Espoo Blues

== Nordic combined ==
Men's sprint

Events:

- large hill ski jumping
- 7.5 km cross-country skiing (Start delay, based on ski jumping results.)

Athlete	Ski Jumping		Cross-country time	Total rank
Athlete	Points	Rank	Cross-country time	Total rank
Mikko Keskinarkaus	101.7	23	18:31.4	23
Hannu Manninen	104.7	17	17:42.7	7
Jaakko Tallus	119.0	3	17:25.9	4
Samppa Lajunen	123.8	1	16:40.1	1st place, gold medalist(s)

Men's individual

Events:

- normal hill ski jumping
- 15 km cross-country skiing (Start delay, based on ski jumping results.)

Athlete	Ski Jumping		Cross-country time	Total rank
Athlete	Points	Rank	Cross-country time	Total rank
Mikko Keskinarkaus	209.0	34	44:38.9	28
Hannu Manninen	221.5	22	42:21.1	14
Samppa Lajunen	257.0	3	39:11.7	1st place, gold medalist(s)
Jaakko Tallus	267.5	1	39:36.4	2nd place, silver medalist(s)

Men's Team

Four participants per team.

Events:

- normal hill ski jumping
- 5 km cross-country skiing (Start delay, based on ski jumping results.)

Athletes	Ski jumping		Cross-country time	Total rank
Athletes	Points	Rank	Cross-country time	Total rank
Jari Mantila; Jaakko Tallus; Hannu Manninen; Samppa Lajunen	967.5	1	48:42.2	1st place, gold medalist(s)

== Ski jumping ==
Athlete	Event	Qualifying jump			Final jump 1			Final jump 2		Total	
Athlete	Event	Distance	Points	Rank	Distance	Points	Rank	Distance	Points	Points	Rank
Veli-Matti Lindström	Normal hill	90.0	114.0	13 Q	95.0	121.5	7 Q	95.5	126.5	253.0	5
Toni Nieminen	Normal hill	91.5	119.0	4 Q	91.5	117.0	18 Q	91.5	118.5	235.5	16
Janne Ahonen	Normal hill	94.0	125.0	1 Q	95.5	128.0	4 Q	98.0	133.5	261.5	4
Matti Hautamäki	Normal hill	Pre-qualified			93.0	121.5	7 Q	97.0	131.0	252.5	6
Janne Ahonen	Large hill	117.5	111.0	7 Q	124.0	119.2	16 Q	123.5	122.3	241.5	9
Veli-Matti Lindström	Large hill	121.0	114.3	3 Q	114.5	102.1	37	did not advance			
Risto Jussilainen	Large hill	Pre-qualified			121.5	116.7	18 Q	117.5	109.5	226.2	18
Matti Hautamäki	Large hill	Pre-qualified			127.0	129.1	4 Q	125.5	126.9	256.0	3rd place, bronze medalist(s)

Men's team large hill

Athletes	Result	
Athletes	Points ^{1}	Rank
Matti Hautamäki; Veli-Matti Lindström; Risto Jussilainen; Janne Ahonen	974.0	2nd place, silver medalist(s)

^{1} Four teams members performed two jumps each.

== Snowboarding ==
Men's halfpipe

Athlete	Qualifying round 1		Qualifying round 2		Final	
Athlete	Points	Rank	Points	Rank	Points	Rank
Tuomo Ojala	28.2	21	23.3	24	did not advance	
Risto Mattila	35.7	10	34.3	10	did not advance	
Markku Koski	36.9	7	41.3	4 QF	39.0	8
Heikki Sorsa	44.2	1 QF			40.4	7

Women's halfpipe

Athlete	Qualifying round 1		Qualifying round 2		Final	
Athlete	Points	Rank	Points	Rank	Points	Rank
Kirsi Rautava	23.6	16	24.7	12	did not advance	
Sari Grönholm	24.3	15	22.4	13	did not advance	
Minna Hesso	25.4	13	32.1	6 QF	31.9	9

== Speed skating ==
Men

Event	Athlete	Race 1		Race 2		Total	
Event	Athlete	Time	Rank	Time	Rank	Time	Rank
500 m	Janne Hänninen	35.18	14	35.15	18	70.33	15
1000 m	Risto Rosendahl					1:10.70	33
1000 m	Janne Hänninen					1:08.45	10
1500 m	Risto Rosendahl					1:48.57	32
1500 m	Vesa Rosendahl					1:48.02	27
1500 m	Janne Hänninen					1:46.04	13
