= Snowboarding at the 2002 Winter Olympics – Women's halfpipe =

Women's halfpipe at the XIX Olympic Winter Games
- Pictogram for snowboarding
- Venue: Park City
- Date: 10 February 2002
- Competitors: 23 from 12 nations
- Winning score: 47.9

Medalists
1st place, gold medalist(s)		Kelly Clark	United States
2nd place, silver medalist(s)		Doriane Vidal	France
3rd place, bronze medalist(s)		Fabienne Reuteler	Switzerland

The women's halfpipe event in snowboarding at the 2002 Winter Olympics was held in Park City, United States. The competition took place on 10 February 2002.

== Medalists ==
Gold	Kelly Clark; United States
Silver	Doriane Vidal; France
Bronze	Fabienne Reuteler; Switzerland

== Results ==
The halfpipe event for women took place on 11 February 2002, both the qualification rounds and the finals taking place on that day. Fortythirty snowboarders took part in the qualification, the top twelve of whom move on to the finals.

In the qualification round, each snowboarder was given two runs to be in the top six of that run. Regardless of how many points the person received, as long as they placed in the top six, they advanced to the finals. If the person qualified in the first run, they did not need to do a second run in the qualification. The finals proceeded in a similar fashion. The twelve qualifiers had two runs in which to score the highest possible points. The snowboarders were ranked by their highest score, and medals were awarded accordingly. The following is a table detailing the results of the qualification and finals runs of the competing snowboarders.

Rank	Name	Country	Qual. 1	Qual. 2	Qual. Rank	Final 1	Final 2	Final Best
1st place, gold medalist(s)	Kelly Clark	United States	42.1	-	1	~~40.8~~	47.9	47.9
2nd place, silver medalist(s)	Doriane Vidal	France	38.3	-	3	43.0	~~36.5~~	43.0
3rd place, bronze medalist(s)	Fabienne Reuteler	Switzerland	32.0	40.4	7	39.7	~~29.3~~	39.7
4	Kjersti Buaas Oe	Norway	38.7	-	2	37.3	~~35.1~~	37.3
5	Shannon Dunn-Downing	United States	31.3	39.0	8	~~35.5~~	37.2	37.2
6	Tricia Byrnes	United States	30.8	35.7	10	~~25.1~~	36.4	36.4
7	Nici Pederzolli	Austria	34.1	-	5	35.7	~~30.7~~	35.7
8	Yoko Miyake	Japan	24.5	35.4	11	~~23.5~~	33.7	33.7
9	Minna Hesso	Finland	25.4	32.1	12	~~28.4~~	31.9	31.9
10	Lisa Therese Wiik	Norway	33.1	-	6	~~24.4~~	28.9	28.9
11	Nicola Thost	Germany	34.3	-	4	27.7	~~25.3~~	27.7
12	Michiyo Hashimoto	Japan	27.0	38.0	9	26.6	~~26.0~~	26.6
13	Stine Brun Kjeldaas	Norway	27.1	30.9	13	-		
14	Sabine Wehr-Hasler	Germany	22.1	29.7	14	-		
15	Natasza Zurek	Canada	30.0	28.6	15	-		
16	Alessandra Pescosta	Italy	16.7	27.4	16	-		
17	Lesley McKenna	Great Britain	12.5	25.3	17	-		
18	Kirsi Rautava	Finland	23.6	24.7	18	-		
19	Sari Gronholm	Finland	24.3	22.4	19	-		
20	Yuri Yoshikawa	Japan	17.7	21.8	20	-		
21	Janet Jonsson	Sweden	13.0	16.1	21	-		
22	Nagako Mori	Japan	14.4	13.0	22	-		
23	Anna Hellman	Sweden	19.6	DNF	23	-		
