= Snowboarding at the 1998 Winter Olympics – Women's halfpipe =

Women's Halfpipe at the XVIII Olympic Winter Games
- Snowboarding
- Venue: Kanbayashi Snowboard Park
- Date: 12 February 1998
- Competitors: 26 from 11 nations
- Winning Score: 74.6

Medalists
1st place, gold medalist(s)		Nicola Thost	Germany
2nd place, silver medalist(s)		Stine Brun Kjeldaas	Norway
3rd place, bronze medalist(s)		Shannon Dunn-Downing	United States

The women's halfpipe competition of the Nagano 1998 Olympics was held at Kanbayashi Snowboard Park.

== Results ==
=== Qualifying ===
==== Round 1 ====
The top four automatically qualified for the final.

Rank	Name	Country	Points	Notes
1	Stine Brun Kjeldaas	Norway	37.6	Q
2	Cara-Beth Burnside	United States	36.7	Q
3	Jenny Jonsson	Sweden	34.5	Q
4	Maëlle Ricker	Canada	34.4	Q
5	Minna Hesso	Finland	34.2	
6	Natasza Zurek	Canada	33.9	
7	Shannon Dunn-Downing	United States	33.3	
8	Tara Teigen	Canada	32.9	
9	Anita Schwaller	Switzerland	32.0	
10	Jennie Waara	Sweden	31.9	
11	Satu Järvelä	Finland	31.8	
12	Nicola Pederzolli	Austria	31.5	
13	Nicola Thost	Germany	30.6	
14	Barrett Christy	United States	30.3	
15	Sabine Wehr-Hasler	Germany	29.5	
16	Anne Molin Kongsgård	Norway	29.3	
17	Doriane Vidal	France	27.2	
18	Michelle Taggart	United States	26.1	
19	Lori Glazier	Canada	25.9	
20	Yuri Yoshikawa	Japan	25.6	
21	Ulrike Hölzl	Austria	24.8	
22	Christel Thoresen	Norway	24.3	
23	Kaori Takeyama	Japan	23.5	
24	Alessandra Pescosta	Italy	22.8	
25	Sandra Farmand	Germany	22.1	
26	Anna Hellman	Sweden	20.0	

==== Round 2 ====
The top four finishers qualified for the final.

Rank	Name	Country	Points	Notes
1	Nicola Thost	Germany	37.4	Q
2	Shannon Dunn-Downing	United States	36.6	Q
3	Minna Hesso	Finland	35.1	Q
4	Jennie Waara	Sweden	34.5	Q
5	Nicola Pederzolli	Austria	34.4	
6	Tara Teigen	Canada	33.3	
7	Anita Schwaller	Switzerland	32.2	
8	Doriane Vidal	France	32.1	
9	Satu Järvelä	Finland	32.0	
10	Barrett Christy	United States	31.6	
11	Sabine Wehr-Hasler	Germany	30.5	
12	Anne Molin Kongsgård	Norway	29.2	
13	Ulrike Hölzl	Austria	29.1	
14	Lori Glazier	Canada	26.9	
15	Michelle Taggart	United States	25.5	
16	Yuri Yoshikawa	Japan	24.9	
17	Christel Thoresen	Norway	24.4	
18	Kaori Takeyama	Japan	22.7	
19	Anna Hellman	Sweden	22.7	
20	Alessandra Pescosta	Italy	18.9	
21	Natasza Zurek	Canada	11.6	
-	Sandra Farmand	Germany	DNF	

=== Final ===
The eight finalists each competed in two runs, with the total score counting for ranking.

Rank	Name	Country	Run 1	Run 2	Total
1st place, gold medalist(s)	Nicola Thost	Germany	37.50	37.10	74.60
2nd place, silver medalist(s)	Stine Brun Kjeldaas	Norway	36.70	37.50	74.20
3rd place, bronze medalist(s)	Shannon Dunn-Downing	United States	38.80	34.00	72.80
4	Cara-Beth Burnside	United States	36.10	36.50	72.60
5	Maëlle Ricker	Canada	36.80	34.30	71.10
6	Minna Hesso	Finland	34.80	36.00	70.80
7	Jenny Jonsson	Sweden	31.80	34.10	65.90
8	Jennie Waara	Sweden	30.90	31.80	62.70
