= Charlet =

Charlet is a French surname. Notable people with the surname include:

- Adolphe Charlet (1908–2009) French sculptor
- Alexandre Charlet, French actor
- André Charlet (1898–1954), French ice hockey player
- Armand Charlet (1900–1975), French mountain climber and guide
- Blanche Charlet (1898–1985), British agent and French resistance fighter in World War II
- Étienne Charlet (1756–1795), French general of the French Revolutionary Wars
- Frantz Charlet (1862–1928) was a Belgian painter, etcher and lithographer
- Isabella Charlet-Straton (1838–1918), British mountain climber
- Jean Baptiste Charlet (born 1978), French snowboarder
- José Charlet (1916–1993), French architect, painter, sculptor and academic
- Julien Charlet, French curler and coach
- Laurent Charlet (b. 1955), French geochemist
- Mandy Charlet (born 1986), Luxembourgish footballer and athlete
- Nicolas Toussaint Charlet (1792–1845), French painter of military subjects
- Régis Charlet (1920–1998), French ski jumper
- René Charlet (1903–1971), French bobsledder
- Victor Charlet (born 1993), French field hockey player
