= FIS Snowboarding World Championships 1997 =

International snowboarding competition

The FIS Snowboarding World Championships 1997 took place between January 21 and January 26 in Innichen, Italy.

== Results ==
=== Men's results ===
==== Snowboard Cross ====
Medal	Name	Nation
1st place, gold medalist(s)	Helmut Pramstaller	Austria
2nd place, silver medalist(s)	Klaus Stammer	Austria
3rd place, bronze medalist(s)	Jakob Bergstedt	Sweden

==== Giant Slalom ====
Medal	Name	Nation
1st place, gold medalist(s)	Thomas Prugger	Italy
2nd place, silver medalist(s)	Mike Jacoby	United States
3rd place, bronze medalist(s)	Ian Price	United States

==== Parallel Slalom ====
Medal	Name	Nation
1st place, gold medalist(s)	Mike Jacoby	United States
2nd place, silver medalist(s)	Elmar Messner	Italy
3rd place, bronze medalist(s)	Bernd Kroschewski	Germany

==== Slalom ====
Medal	Name	Nation
1st place, gold medalist(s)	Bernd Kroschewski	Germany
2nd place, silver medalist(s)	Dieter Moherndl	Germany
3rd place, bronze medalist(s)	Anton Pogue	United States

==== Halfpipe ====
Medal	Name	Nation
1st place, gold medalist(s)	Fabien Rohrer	Switzerland
2nd place, silver medalist(s)	Markus Hurme	Finland
3rd place, bronze medalist(s)	Roger Hjelmstadstuen	Norway

=== Women's Events ===
==== Snowboard Cross ====
Medal	Name	Nation
1st place, gold medalist(s)	Karine Ruby	France
2nd place, silver medalist(s)	Manuela Riegler	Austria
3rd place, bronze medalist(s)	Maria Kirchgasser-Pichler	Austria

==== Giant Slalom ====
Medal	Name	Nation
1st place, gold medalist(s)	Sondra Van Ert	United States
2nd place, silver medalist(s)	Karine Ruby	France
3rd place, bronze medalist(s)	Margherita Parini	Italy

==== Parallel Slalom ====
Medal	Name	Nation
1st place, gold medalist(s)	Dagmar Mair Unter Der Eggen	Italy
2nd place, silver medalist(s)	Karine Ruby	France
3rd place, bronze medalist(s)	Marie Birkl	Sweden

==== Slalom ====
Medal	Name	Nation
1st place, gold medalist(s)	Heidi Renoth	Germany
2nd place, silver medalist(s)	Dagmar Mair Unter Der Eggen	Italy
3rd place, bronze medalist(s)	Dorothée Fournier	France

==== Halfpipe ====
Medal	Name	Nation
1st place, gold medalist(s)	Anita Schwaller	Switzerland
2nd place, silver medalist(s)	Christel Thoresen	Norway
3rd place, bronze medalist(s)	Sabine Wehr-Hasler	Germany

== Medal table ==
Place	Country				Total
1	Italy	2	2	1	5
2	United States	2	1	2	5
2	Germany	2	1	2	5
4	Austria	1	2	1	4
4	France	1	2	1	4
6	Switzerland	2	0	0	2
6	Norway	0	1	1	2
6	Sweden	0	0	2	2
9	Finland	0	1	0	1
