= Toyota Big Air =

Japanese snowboarding contest

Toyota Big Air is a Japanese snowboarding (Straight jump) contest. This contest has been held in the Makomanai Open Stadium, Sapporo, Hokkaido since 1997, and from 2012 at the Sapporo Dome. The organizing office of the event announced on September 30, 2014 that the event would no longer take place, making the previous event held on February 23, 2014 the final edition.

== Winners ==
Years	1st place	2nd place	3rd place
1997	(Switzerland) Fabien Rohrer	(Austria) Max Ploetzenneder	(Switzerland) Michi Albin
1998	(Switzerland) Michi Albin	(Finland) Juha Tenkku	(Japan) Narufumi Yoshimura
1999	(Switzerland) Michi Albin	(Austria) Stefan Gimpl	(United States) Jim Rippey
2000	(Switzerland) Jonas Emery	(Austria) Stefan Gimpl	(Norway) Daniel Franck
2001	(Canada) Guillaume Morisset	(Norway) Roger Hjelmstadstuen	(Austria) Stefan Gimpl
2002	(United States) Shaun White	(Austria) Stefan Gimpl	(Japan) Akifumi Hiraoka
2003	(Norway) Roger Hjelmstadstuen	(Norway) Daniel Franck	(Austria) Stefan Gimpl
2004	(Canada) Marc-Andre Tarte	(Finland) Eero Ettala	(Norway) Daniel Franck
2005	(Finland) Eero Ettala	(France) Mathieu Crepel	(Norway) Roger Hjelmstadstuen (Switzerland) Nicolas Müller
2006	(Switzerland) Nicolas Muller	(Finland) Eero Ettala	(Canada) Trevor Andrew
2007	(United States) Kevin Pearce	(Finland) Risto Mattila	(Finland) Antti Autti (Switzerland) Nicolas Muller
2008	(Finland) Antti Autti	(Finland) Risto Mattila	(United States) Kevin Pearce (Japan) Masatake Yamamoto
2009	(Finland) Eero Ettala	(United States) Tim Humphreys	(Finland) Risto Mattila
2010	(Finland) Peetu Piiroinen	(Finland) Eero Ettala	(Finland) Antti Autti (Belgium) Seppe Smits
2011	(United States) Chas Guldemond	(Canada) Sebastien Toutant	(Canada) Mark McMorris (Belgium) Seppe Smits
