= List of Finnish records in speed skating =

The following are the national records in speed skating in Finland maintained by Suomen Luisteluliitto.

== Men ==
Event	Record	Athlete	Date	Meet	Place	Ref
500 meters	34.17	Mika Poutala	8 December 2017	World Cup	Salt Lake City, United States	
500 meters × 2	69.38	Pekka Koskela	9 March 2007	World Single Distance Championships	Salt Lake City, United States	
1000 meters	1:07.00	Pekka Koskela	10 November 2007	World Cup	Salt Lake City, United States	
1500 meters	1:45.46	Risto Rosendahl	11 March 2007	World Single Distance Championships	Salt Lake City, United States	
3000 meters	3:47.36	Tommi Pulli	15 March 2011	Olympic Oval Final	Calgary, Canada	
5000 meters	6:33.84	Jarmo Valtonen	19 November 2005	World Cup	Salt Lake City, United States	
10000 meters	13:56.42	Jarmo Valtonen	4 December 2005	World Cup	Heerenveen, Netherlands	
Team pursuit (8 laps)	3:48.90	Robert Brandt; Vesa Rosendahl; Jarmo Valtonen	12 November 2005	World Cup	Calgary, Canada	
Sprint combination	136.635 pts	Mika Poutala	25–26 February 2017	World Sprint Championships	Calgary, Canada	
Small combination	150.044 pts	Tommi Pulli	March 2011	Olympic Oval Final	Calgary, Canada	
Big combination	155.278 pts	Vesa Rosendahl	March 2001	Olympic Oval Final	Calgary, Canada	

== Women ==
Event	Record	Athlete	Date	Meet	Place	Ref
500 meters	38.70	Elina Risku	15 November 2015	World Cup	Calgary, Canada	
500 meters × 2	79.65	Elina Risku	13 February 2016	World Single Distance Championships	Kolomna, Russia	
1000 meters	1:18.04	Laura Kivioja	21 November 2025	World Cup	Calgary, Canada	
1500 meters	2:02.46	Laura Kivioja	19 September 2026	Nagano Fall Classic	Calgary, Canada	
3000 meters	4:26.78	Elina Risku	16 March 2011	Olympic Oval Final	Calgary, Canada	
5000 meters	7:38.77	Pia Humisto	20 March 2009	Olympic Oval Final	Calgary, Canada	
10000 meters	22:38.20	Mari Moisala	24 March 1996		Rovaniemi, Finland	
Team pursuit (6 laps)	3:31.28	Saana Hyttinen; Laura Koriseva; Elina Risku	6 March 2010	Junior World Cup	Berlin, Germany	
Sprint combination	160.185 pts	Elina Risku	17–18 October 2015	International Race	Inzell. Germany	
Mini combination	164.818 pts	Elina Risku	15–16 March 2011	Olympic Oval Final	Calgary, Canada	
Small combination	175.784 pts	Pia Humisto	18–20 March 2009	Olympic Oval Final	Calgary, Canada	

== Mixed ==
Event	Record	Athlete	Date	Meet	Place	Ref
Relay	2:58.62	Tuukka Suomalainen; Laura Kivioja	23 November 2025	World Cup	Calgary, Canada	
