= 1999 Teen Choice Awards =

American awards ceremony held in California

- Date: August 1, 1999
- Location: Barker Hangar, Santa Monica, California
- Hosted by: None
- Website: http://www.empireonline.com

Television/radio coverage
- Network: Fox

The 1999 Teen Choice Awards ceremony was held on August 1, 1999, at the Barker Hangar, Santa Monica, California. The event did not have a designated host, however, Britney Spears introduced the show with Christina Aguilera, Blink-182, NSYNC and Gloria Estefan, and Britney Spears as performers.

== Performers ==
- Christina Aguilera – "Genie in a Bottle"
- Blink-182 – "What's My Age Again?"
- NSYNC and Gloria Estefan – "Music of My Heart"
- Britney Spears – "Sometimes" and "(You Drive Me) Crazy"

== Presenters ==
- 98 Degrees
- Christina Aguilera
- Tatyana Ali
- Lisa Andersen
- Brandi Chastain
- Holly Marie Combs
- Jesse Eisenberg
- Daisy Fuentes
- Jennie Garth
- Alyson Hannigan
- Melissa Joan Hart
- Anne Hathaway
- Jordan Knight
- Mila Kunis
- Ashton Kutcher
- Ali Landry
- LFO
- Tara Lipinski
- Jennifer Lopez
- Kellie Martin
- Master P
- Matthew McConaughey
- Monica
- Meredith Monroe
- Eric Christian Olsen
- Luke Perry
- Bijou Phillips
- Dr. Drew Pinsky
- Antonio Sabàto Jr.
- Kelly Slater
- Britney Spears
- Steps
- Verne Troyer
- Tyrese
- Wilmer Valderrama
- Marlon Wayans
- Shawn Wayans
- Ian Ziering

== Winners and nominees ==
Winners are listed first and highlighted in bold text.

=== Movies ===
Choice Movie Actor	Choice Movie Actress
**Freddie Prinze Jr. – She's All That**; Ben Affleck – Armageddon; Matt Damon – Rounders; Ryan Phillippe – Cruel Intentions; Giovanni Ribisi – The Mod Squad; Adam Sandler – The Waterboy; Will Smith – Enemy of the State; Ben Stiller – There's Something About Mary	**Jennifer Love Hewitt – I Still Know What You Did Last Summer**; Drew Barrymore – Never Been Kissed; Claire Danes – The Mod Squad; Cameron Diaz – There's Something About Mary; Kirsten Dunst – All I Wanna Do; Gwyneth Paltrow – Shakespeare in Love; Christina Ricci – 200 Cigarettes; Reese Witherspoon – Cruel Intentions
Choice Drama Movie	Choice Comedy Movie
**Cruel Intentions**; Enemy of the State; Ever After; October Sky; Pleasantville; Star Wars: Episode I – The Phantom Menace; Stepmom; Varsity Blues	**There's Something About Mary**; 10 Things I Hate About You; Election; Never Been Kissed; Patch Adams; Shakespeare in Love; She's All That; The Waterboy
Choice Movie Sleazebag	Choice Movie Breakout
**Sarah Michelle Gellar – Cruel Intentions**; Chris Cooper – October Sky; Anjelica Huston – Ever After; Andrew Keegan – 10 Things I Hate About You; Mike Myers – Austin Powers: The Spy Who Shagged Me; Ray Park – Star Wars: Episode I – The Phantom Menace; Ryan Phillippe – Cruel Intentions; Matthew Settle – I Still Know What You Did Last Summer	**James Van Der Beek – Varsity Blues**; Clea DuVall – The Faculty; Jake Gyllenhaal – October Sky; Natasha Lyonne – Slums of Beverly Hills; Sarah Polley – Go; Jason Schwartzman – Rushmore; Dougray Scott – Ever After; Julia Stiles – 10 Things I Hate About You
Choice Movie Hissy Fit	Choice Movie Soundtrack
**Sandra Bullock – Forces of Nature**; Leonardo DiCaprio – Celebrity; Joseph Gordon-Levitt – 10 Things I Hate About You; Lisa Kudrow – The Opposite of Sex; Ewan McGregor – Star Wars: Episode I – The Phantom Menace; Ryan Phillippe – Cruel Intentions; Jason Schwartzman – Rushmore; Reese Witherspoon – Election	**City of Angels**; 10 Things I Hate About You; Bulworth; The Corruptor; Cruel Intentions; The Faculty; The Rugrats Movie; Varsity Blues
Most Funniest Scene	Most Disgusting Scene
**Matt Dillon – There's Something About Mary**; David Krumholtz – 10 Things I Hate About You; Natasha Lyonne & Marisa Tomei – Slums of Beverly Hills; Jay Mohr & Scott Wolf – Go; Reese Witherspoon & Joan Allen – Pleasantville	**Cameron Diaz – There's Something About Mary**; Laura Harris – The Faculty; Jennifer Love Hewitt – I Still Know What You Did Last Summer; Devon Sawa – Idle Hands; Henry Winkler – The Waterboy
Sexiest Love Scene	Choice Summer Movie
**Rachael Leigh Cook and Freddie Prinze Jr. – She's All That**; Joseph Fiennes and Gwyneth Paltrow – Shakespeare in Love; Elizabeth Hurley and Matthew McConaughey – EDtv; Heath Ledger and Julia Stiles – 10 Things I Hate About You; Ryan Phillippe and Reese Witherspoon – Cruel Intentions	**Big Daddy**; American Pie; Austin Powers: The Spy Who Shagged Me; The Mummy; Notting Hill; Star Wars: Episode I – The Phantom Menace; Tarzan; Wild Wild West

=== Television ===
Choice TV Actor	Choice TV Actress
**Joshua Jackson – Dawson's Creek**; David Boreanaz – Buffy the Vampire Slayer; Scott Foley – Felicity; Joseph Gordon-Levitt – 3rd Rock from the Sun; James Van Der Beek – Dawson's Creek; Barry Watson – 7th Heaven; Scott Wolf – Party of Five; Noah Wyle – ER	**Sarah Michelle Gellar – Buffy the Vampire Slayer**; Brandy – Moesha; Neve Campbell – Party of Five; Jennie Garth – Beverly Hills, 90210; Melissa Joan Hart – Sabrina the Teenage Witch; Jennifer Love Hewitt – Party of Five; Katie Holmes – Dawson's Creek; Keri Russell – Felicity
Choice TV Drama	Choice TV Comedy
**Dawson's Creek**; 7th Heaven; Buffy the Vampire Slayer; Charmed; ER; Felicity; Party of Five; The X-Files	**Friends**; 3rd Rock from the Sun; Dharma & Greg; Home Improvement; Moesha; Sabrina the Teenage Witch; South Park; That '70s Show; Two Guys and a Girl
Choice Breakout TV Star
**Keri Russell – Felicity**; Selma Blair – Zoe, Duncan, Jack and Jane; Rachael Leigh Cook – Dawson's Creek; Scott Foley – Felicity; Topher Grace – That '70s Show; Meredith Monroe – Dawson's Creek; Laura Prepon – That '70s Show; Scott Speedman – Felicity

=== Music ===
Choice Male Artist	Choice Female Artist
**Ricky Martin**; Ginuwine; Jay-Z; R. Kelly; Jordan Knight; Mase; Puff Daddy; Will Smith	**Brandy**; Christina Aguilera; Mariah Carey; Faith Evans; Lauryn Hill; Monica; Britney Spears; Shania Twain
Choice Music Group	Choice Music Single
**TLC**; 98 Degrees; Aerosmith; Backstreet Boys; Goo Goo Dolls; NSYNC; Smash Mouth; TRU	**"...Baby One More Time" – Britney Spears**; "Doo Wop (That Thing)" – Lauryn Hill; "Genie in a Bottle" – Christina Aguilera; "I Don't Want to Miss a Thing" – Aerosmith; "I Want It That Way" – Backstreet Boys; "Livin' la Vida Loca" – Ricky Martin; "Man! I Feel Like a Woman!" – Shania Twain; "Wild Wild West" – Will Smith
Choice Music Album	Choice Rap Track
**...Baby One More Time – Britney Spears**; Astro Lounge – Smash Mouth; The Boy Is Mine – Monica; FanMail – TLC; Jordan Knight – Jordan Knight; The Miseducation of Lauryn Hill – Lauryn Hill; R. – R. Kelly; Vol. 2... Hard Knock Life – Jay-Z	**"My Name Is" – Eminem**; "Get Ready" – Mase; "Hate Me Now" – Nas feat. Puff Daddy; "Holla Holla" – Ja Rule; "Hoody Hooo" – TRU; "Miami" – Will Smith; "Nigga What, Nigga Who (Originator 99)" – Jay-Z; "Wild Wild West" – Will Smith
Choice Love Song	Choice Breakout Artist
**"I Don't Want to Miss a Thing" – Aerosmith**; "Angel of Mine" – Monica; "Because of You" – 98 Degrees; "I'll Never Break Your Heart" – Backstreet Boys; "Kiss Me" – Sixpence None the Richer; "Love Like This" – Faith Evans; "So Anxious" – Ginuwine; "When You Believe" – Mariah Carey & Whitney Houston	**98 Degrees**; Eminem; Lauryn Hill; Ja Rule; Jordan Knight; Jennifer Lopez; NSYNC; Britney Spears
Choice Music Video	Choice Summer Song
**"All I Have to Give" – Backstreet Boys**; "...Baby One More Time" – Britney Spears; "Genie in a Bottle" – Christina Aguilera; "I Want It That Way" – Backstreet Boys; "Livin' la Vida Loca" – Ricky Martin; "My Name Is" – Eminem; "No Scrubs" – TLC; "Wild Wild West" – Will Smith	**"If You Had My Love" – Jennifer Lopez**; "All Star" – Smash Mouth; "Beautiful Stranger" – Madonna; "Genie in a Bottle" – Christina Aguilera; "Hate Me Now" – Nas feat. Puff Daddy; "I Want It That Way" – Backstreet Boys; "Livin' la Vida Loca" – Ricky Martin; "Wild Wild West" – Will Smith

=== Miscellaneous ===
Choice Male Hottie	Choice Female Hottie
**Freddie Prinze Jr.**; Ben Affleck; David Boreanaz; Matt Damon; Leonardo DiCaprio; Jordan Knight; Ricky Martin; Will Smith	**Jennifer Love Hewitt**; Drew Barrymore; Kirsten Dunst; Sarah Michelle Gellar; Katie Holmes; Keri Russell; Britney Spears; Reese Witherspoon
Choice Comedian	Choice Male Athlete
**Adam Sandler**; Tim Allen; Darrell Hammond; Jay Leno; David Letterman; Rosie O'Donnell; Chris Rock; Robin Williams	**Kobe Bryant**; Andre Agassi; John Elway; Michael Jordan; Lennox Lewis; Mark McGwire; Joe Nieuwendyk; Tiger Woods
Choice Female Athlete	Choice Male Extreme Athlete
**Tara Lipinski**; Cynthia Cooper; Steffi Graf; Mia Hamm; Michelle Kwan; Lisa Leslie; Picabo Street; Kristi Yamaguchi	**Shaun Palmer**; Tony Hawk; Andy Macdonald; Dave Mirra; Jonny Moseley; Travis Pastrana; Kelly Slater; Danny Way
Choice Female Extreme Athlete	Choice Professional Wrestler
**Jennie Waara**; Megan Abubo; Lisa Andersen; Layne Beachley; Tara Dakides; Dallas Friday; Nikki Stone; Picabo Street	**Stone Cold Steve Austin**; Goldberg; Hulk Hogan; Kevin Nash; The Rock; Sable; The Undertaker
Choice Model
**Tyra Banks**; Shalom Harlow; Mali; Sarah McNeilly; Rebecca Romijn-Stamos; Kim Smith; Niki Taylor; Tyrese
