= Spain at the 1998 Winter Olympics =

- IOC code: ESP
- NOC: Spanish Olympic Committee
- Website: www.coe.es (in Spanish)

in Nagano
- Competitors: 12 (7 men, 5 women) in 4 sports
- Flag bearer: Juan Jesús Gutiérrez (cross-country skiing)
- Medals: Gold 0 Silver 0 Bronze 0 Total 0

Winter Olympics appearances (overview)
- 1936; 1948; 1952; 1956; 1960; 1964; 1968; 1972; 1976; 1980; 1984; 1988; 1992; 1994; 1998; 2002; 2006; 2010; 2014; 2018; 2022; 2026

Spain competed at the 1998 Winter Olympics in Nagano, Japan.

== Competitors ==
The following is the list of number of competitors in the Games.

Sport	Men	Women	Total
Alpine skiing	0	4	4
Cross-country skiing	5	0	5
Figure skating	0	1	1
Snowboarding	2	0	2
Total	7	5	12

== Alpine skiing ==
Women

Athlete	Event	Race 1	Race 2	Total	
Athlete	Event	Time	Time	Time	Rank
Ainhoa Ibarra	Giant Slalom	DNF	–	DNF	–
Ana Galindo Santolaria	Giant Slalom	DNF	–	DNF	–
María José Rienda	Giant Slalom	1:21.57	1:33.97	2:55.54	12
Mónica Bosch	Slalom	47.89	DNF	DNF	–
María José Rienda	Slalom	47.73	48.73	1:36.46	14

== Cross-country skiing ==
Men

Event	Athlete	Race	
Event	Athlete	Time	Rank
10 km C	Diego Ruiz	34:17.3	87
10 km C	Álvaro Gijón	33:02.7	82
10 km C	Jordi Ribó	30:45.0	54
10 km C	Juan Jesús Gutiérrez	29:29.0	33
15 km pursuit^{1} F	Juan Jesús Gutiérrez	DNF	–
15 km pursuit^{1} F	Diego Ruiz	51:09.2	65
15 km pursuit^{1} F	Álvaro Gijón	49:49.2	62
15 km pursuit^{1} F	Jordi Ribó	47:27.3	54
50 km F	Juan Jesús Gutiérrez	DNF	–
50 km F	Haritz Zunzunegui	DNF	–
50 km F	Álvaro Gijón	2'20:24.7	42
50 km F	Jordi Ribó	2'16:04.8	25

^{1} Starting delay based on 10 km results.
C = Classical style, F = Freestyle

Men's 4 × 10 km relay

Athletes	Race	
Athletes	Time	Rank
Jordi Ribó; Diego Ruiz; Juan Jesús Gutiérrez; Álvaro Gijón	1'49:27.9	19

== Figure skating ==
Women

Athlete	SP	FS	TFP	Rank
Marta Andrade	24	22	34.0	22

== Snowboarding ==
Men's halfpipe

Athlete	Qualifying round 1		Qualifying round 2		Final	
Athlete	Points	Rank	Points	Rank	Points	Rank
Sergio Bartrina	27.5	33	37.4	13	did not advance	
Íker Fernández	36.9	12	37.9	11	did not advance	
