= Patrik Hasler =

Patrik Hasler may refer to:

- Patrik Hasler (skier)
- Patrik Hasler (snowboarder)
