= Janet Jonsson =

Swedish snowboarder

Personal information
- Nationality: Swedish
- Born: 20 July 1977 (age 47); Västerbotten, Sweden

Sport
- Country: Sweden
- Sport: Snowboarding

Janet Jonsson (born 20 July 1977) is a Swedish snowboarder. She was born in Västerbotten. She competed at the 2002 Winter Olympics, in halfpipe.
