= Gabriel Oksanen =

Finnish footballer (born 2006)

Personal information
- Date of birth: 22 September 2006 (age 20)
- Place of birth: San Diego, United States
- Position: Right back

Youth career
- –2021: San Diego Surf
- 2021–2022: Philadelphia Union
- 2022–2023: Real Salt Lake

Senior career*
Years	Team	Apps	(Gls)
2022–2023	Real Monarchs	6	(0)
2024	SJK II	33	(1)
2024–2026	SJK	10	(0)

International career^{‡}
2022–2023	Finland U17	6	(0)
2023–2024	Finland U18	5	(0)
- * Club domestic league appearances and goals as of 18 June 2026 ‡ National team caps and goals as of 18 June 2026

Gabriel Oksanen (born 22 September 2006) is a Finnish professional football player who plays as a right back.

== Club career ==
Oksanen played for San Diego Surf in his youth, before he was scouted by Philadelphia Union at the age of 14, and later joined their academy. In the early 2022, he moved to Real Salt Lake organisation, and since then he has played in 6 league matches for the club's reserve team Real Monarchs in MLS Next Pro.

In July 2023, Oksanen was one of the three Real Salt Lake academy players to trial with Danish club Brøndby IF.

On 14 November 2023, it was reported in Finnish media that Oksanen is close to sign with Finnish club SJK Seinäjoki, playing in the premier division Veikkausliiga. On 21 November 2023, SJK confirmed the signing of Oksanen. He was first registered to the club's academy squad SJK Akatemia. The team will compete in the inaugural season of the newly established second-tier Ykkösliiga, starting in 2024. On 6 September, his deal with SJK was extended for two years with a one-year option. He debuted in Veikkausliiga with SJK first team on 20 September, in a 3–0 away win against Haka.

== International career ==
Oksanen has represented Finland at under-17 youth national team level. On 31 October 2023, he was called up to Finland under-18 national team for two friendly matches against Austria.

== Personal life ==
Born and raised in the United States, Oksanen holds dual Finnish-American citizenship. His father is a Finnish former professional snowboarder Jussi Oksanen, and his mother is English. Oksanen is eligible to represent Finland, England and United States, and has opted to represent Finland at youth national team level.

== Career statistics ==
As of 20 May 2025

Appearances and goals by club, season and competition
Club	Season	League			National cup (Note: Includes Suomen Cup)		League cup (Note: Includes Ykkösliigacup and Finnish League Cup)		Continental		Total	
Club	Season	Division	Apps	Goals	Apps	Goals	Apps	Goals	Apps	Goals	Apps	Goals
Real Monarchs	2022	MLS Next Pro	3	0	–		–		–		3	0
Real Monarchs	2023	MLS Next Pro	3	0	–		–		–		3	0
Real Monarchs	Total		6	0	0	0	0	0	0	0	6	0
SJK Akatemia	2024	Ykkösliiga	20	0	0	0	4	0	–		25	0
SJK Akatemia	2025	Ykkösliiga	3	1	0	0	0	0	–		3	1
SJK Akatemia	Total		23	1	0	0	4	0	0	0	27	1
SJK Seinäjoki	2024	Veikkausliiga	4	0	1	0	0	0	–		5	0
SJK Seinäjoki	2025	Veikkausliiga	3	0	0	0	3	0	0	0	6	0
SJK Seinäjoki	Total		7	0	1	0	3	0	0	0	11	0
Career total			35	1	1	0	7	0	0	0	43	1
