= Bertrand Denervaud =

Swiss snowboarder

Personal information
- Nationality: Swiss
- Born: 7 May 1970 (age 54); Fribourg, Switzerland

Sport
- Sport: Snowboarding

Bertrand Denervaud (born 7 May 1970) is a Swiss snowboarder. He competed in the men's halfpipe event at the 1998 Winter Olympics.
