= Kaori Takeyama =

Japanese snowboarder (born 1972)

Personal information
- Nationality: Japanese
- Born: 12 January 1972 (age 53); Hokkaido, Japan

Sport
- Sport: Snowboarding

Kaori Takeyama (born 12 January 1972) is a Japanese snowboarder. She competed in the women's halfpipe event at the 1998 Winter Olympics.
