= Jacob Söderqvist =

Swedish snowboarder (born 1976)

Personal information
- Nationality: Swedish
- Born: 4 May 1976 (age 50) Falun, Sweden

Sport
- Sport: Snowboarding

Jacob Söderqvist (born 4 May 1976) is a Swedish snowboarder. He competed in the men's halfpipe event at the 1998 Winter Olympics.
