= Mount Yakebitai =

Mountain in Nagano Prefecture, Japan

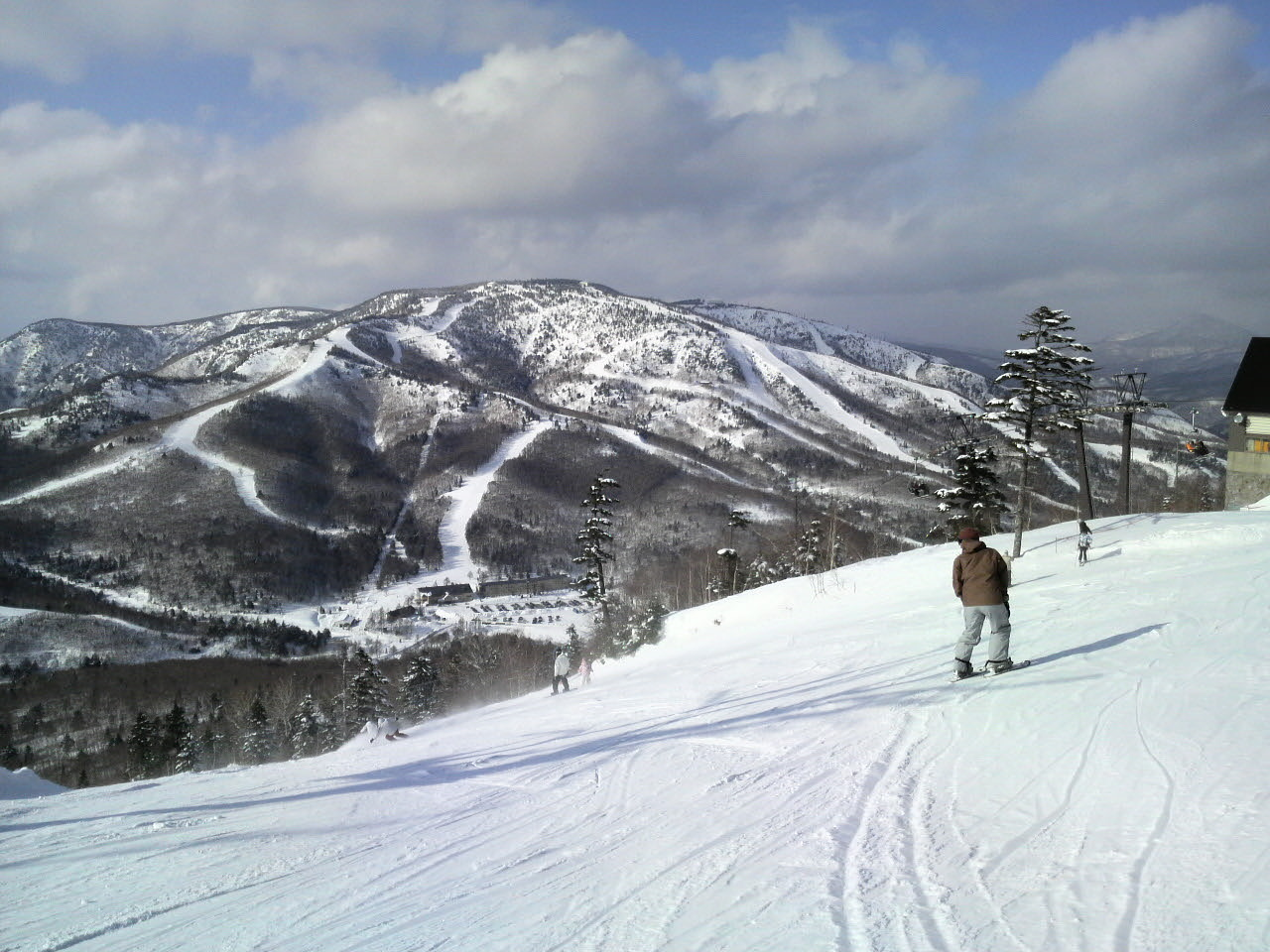
- Mount Yakebitai

Highest point
- Coordinates: 36°46′N 138°31′E

Naming
- Native name: 焼額山 (Japanese)

Geography
- Location within Japan

Mount Yakebitai (焼額山, Yakebitai-yama) is a mountain located in Yamanouchi, Nagano, Japan. For the 1998 Winter Olympics, it hosted the alpine skiing slalom and snowboarding giant slalom events.

During the 1998 games, the mountain suffered a mild earthquake that registered 5.0 on the Richter magnitude scale, but the skiing events continued.
