= Takashi Nishida =

Japanese snowboarder (born 1976)

Personal information
- Nationality: Japanese
- Born: 24 January 1976 (age 49)

Sport
- Sport: Snowboarding

Takashi Nishida (born 24 January 1976) is a Japanese snowboarder. He competed in the men's halfpipe event at the 1998 Winter Olympics.
