= Michelle Taggart =

American snowboarder (born 1970)

Personal information
- Born: 6 May 1970 (age 55) Salem, Oregon, U.S.

Sport
- Sport: Snowboarding

Michelle Taggart (born 6 May 1970) is an American snowboarder, born in Salem, Oregon. She competed in women's halfpipe at the 1998 Winter Olympics in Nagano.
