= Ulrike Hölzl =

Austrian snowboarder

Personal information
- Nationality: Austrian
- Born: 3 February 1975 (age 50)

Sport
- Sport: Snowboarding

Ulrike Hölzl (born 3 February 1975) is an Austrian snowboarder. She competed in women's halfpipe at the 1998 Winter Olympics in Nagano.
