= Christel Thoresen =

Norwegian snowboarder

Personal information
- Nationality: Norwegian
- Born: 15 August 1980 (age 45) Oslo, Norway

Sport
- Country: Norway
- Sport: Snowboarding
- Club: Bærums SK
Medal record
Women's snowboarding
Representing Norway
World Championships
Silver medal – second place	1997 Innichen	Halfpipe

Christel Thoresen (born 15 August 1980) is a retired Norwegian snowboarder.

She was born in Oslo, but represented the club Bærums SK.

She won a silver medal in halfpipe at the FIS Snowboarding World Championships 1997. She competed at the 1998 Winter Olympics, in women's halfpipe.
