= Makoto Takagaki =

Japanese snowboarder (born 1973)

Personal information
- Nationality: Japanese
- Born: 24 December 1973 (age 51); Hokkaido, Japan

Sport
- Sport: Snowboarding

Makoto Takagaki (born 24 December 1973) is a Japanese snowboarder. He competed in the men's halfpipe event at the 1998 Winter Olympics.
