= Łukasz Starowicz =

Polish snowboarder

Personal information
- Nationality: Polish
- Born: 7 May 1976 (age 48); Bielsko-Biała, Poland

Sport
- Sport: Snowboarding

Łukasz Starowicz (born 7 May 1976) is a Polish snowboarder. He competed in two events at the 1998 Winter Olympics.
