= Teen Choice Award for Choice Male Athlete =

Entertainment award category

The following list is a list of Teen Choice Award winners and nominees for Choice Male Athlete. David Beckham receives the most wins with 6.

== Winners and nominees ==
=== 1999 ===
Year	Winner	Nominees	Ref.
1999	Kobe Bryant	Andre Agassi; John Elway; Michael Jordan; Lennox Lewis; Mark McGwire; Joe Nieuwendyk; Tiger Woods	

=== 2000s ===
Year	Winner	Nominees	Ref.
2000	Kobe Bryant	Andre Agassi; Vince Carter; Ken Griffey Jr.; Derek Jeter; Sammy Sosa; Kurt Warner; Tiger Woods	
2001	Shaquille O'Neal	Andre Agassi; Kobe Bryant; Jeff Gordon; Allen Iverson; Derek Jeter; Peyton Manning; Tiger Woods	
2002	Kobe Bryant	Tony Hawk; Derek Jeter; Danny Kass; Jonny Moseley; Shaquille O'Neal; Apolo Anton Ohno; Alex Rodriguez	
2003	Kobe Bryant	Dale Earnhardt Jr.; Tony Hawk; Derek Jeter; Danny Kass; Shaquille O'Neal; Andy Roddick; Kelly Slater	
2004	Tony Hawk	Lance Armstrong; Tom Brady; Kobe Bryant; Dale Earnhardt Jr.; Derek Jeter; Phil Mickelson; Tiger Woods	
2005	Michael Phelps	Lance Armstrong; Tom Brady; Johnny Damon; Dale Earnhardt Jr.; LeBron James; Matt Leinart; Rafael Nadal	
2006	David Beckham	Tom Brady; Matt Leinart; Steve Nash; Dwyane Wade; Vince Young	
2007	Tiger Woods	LeBron James; Peyton Manning; Alex Rodriguez; Dwyane Wade	
2008	David Beckham	Kobe Bryant; LeBron James; Eli Manning; Tiger Woods	
2009	David Beckham	Kobe Bryant; Roger Federer; Michael Phelps; Tiger Woods	

=== 2010s ===
Year	Winner	Nominees	Ref.
2010	David Beckham	Drew Brees; LeBron James; Apolo Anton Ohno; Albert Pujols	
2011	Shaun White	Jon Jones; Dirk Nowitzki; Manny Pacquiao; Alex Rodriguez	
2012	David Beckham	Kobe Bryant; Albert Pujols; Tim Tebow; Shaun White	
2013	David Beckham	LeBron James; Colin Kaepernick; Michael Phelps; Shaun White	
2014	LeBron James	Kevin Durant; Dale Earnhardt Jr.; Tim Howard; Johnny Manziel; Russell Wilson	
2015	Stephen Curry	American Pharoah and Victor Espinoza; Tom Brady; LeBron James; Cristiano Ronaldo; Jordan Spieth	
2016	Stephen Curry	Kobe Bryant; John Cena; Peyton Manning; Roman Reigns; Cristiano Ronaldo	
2017	Stephen Curry	John Cena; Rickie Fowler; LeBron James; Cristiano Ronaldo; Mike Trout	
2018	LeBron James	Stephen Curry; Red Gerard; Adam Rippon; J. J. Watt; Shaun White	
2019	Stephen Curry	James Harden; Patrick Mahomes; Cristiano Ronaldo; AJ Styles; Tiger Woods	
