= Anne Molin Kongsgård =

Norwegian snowboarder

Anne Molin Kongsgård (born 12 November 1977) is a retired Norwegian snowboarder.

She was born in Kongsberg as a granddaughter of Arnholdt Kongsgård, and represented Kongsberg IF. Her specialty was the halfpipe, and she finished 16th at the 1998 Winter Olympics and 23rd at the 2005 World Snowboard Championships. She competed in the FIS Snowboard World Cup until 2006.
