= Janne Hänninen =

Finnish speed skater

Janne Hänninen (born 16 August 1975) is a Finnish former speedskater who specialised on the shorter distances 500 m, 1000 m, and 1500 m.

His personal bests on these distances are 35.00 (1 December 2001), 1:08.45 (16 February 2002), and 1:46.04 (19 February 2002). He participated in three Olympics (1998, 2002, 2006) and a string of World Single Distance Championships and World Sprint Speed Skating Championships. Janne Hänninen is the son of former Finnish speedskater Seppo Hänninen, who also participated in three Olympics (1964, 1968, 1972).

Janne Hänninen's achievements spurred the creation of a new generation of top international class Finnish speedskating sprinters. These include Pekka Koskela, Pasi Koskela, Mika Poutala, Risto Rosendahl, and Vesa Rosendahl.

Hänninen is also a cyclist, participating in Finland's National Championships Road Race in 2007. He came in 20th place.
