= Ingemar Backman =

Swedish snowboarder and poker player (born 1976)

- Nickname: None

World Poker Tour
- Title: None
- Final table: None
- Money finish: 1

European Poker Tour
- Title: None
- Final table: 1
- Money finish: 1

Ingemar Backman (born 1 April 1976 in Gällivare, Sweden) is a professional snowboarder famous for setting the world record highest air out of a quarter-pipe (8.5 metres) in Riksgränsen, Sweden in May 1996. He participated in the 1998 Winter Olympics. The record has since been broken by Finn Heikki Sorsa who made a 9.3 metres high air at The Arctic Challenge event held in Oslo in 2001 and then again by Norwegian Terje Haakonsen who made a 9.8 metres high air at The Arctic Challenge in Oslo in 2007.

After going to snowboard high school in Malung, Sweden, he became the first snowboard superstar emerging out of Sweden although he was soon followed by riders such as Johan Olofsson. He has lived in San Diego, U.S. as well as Piteå, Sweden but currently resides in Skellefteå, Sweden.

Besides snowboarding, Backman is the co-founder of the clothing brand WeSC and the snowboard company Allian.

Lately, Backman has taken a break from snowboarding and instead devoted himself to poker. In his second international tournament, an EPT event held in Baden, Austria in 2005, he finished in fifth place. He is currently sponsored by the internet poker site Martinspoker.

Backman is a playable character in the 2001 video game Shaun Palmer's Pro Snowboarder.

Backman has participated in live poker and has almost $150,000 in live earnings.
