= Guillaume Chastagnol =

French snowboarder (born 1974)

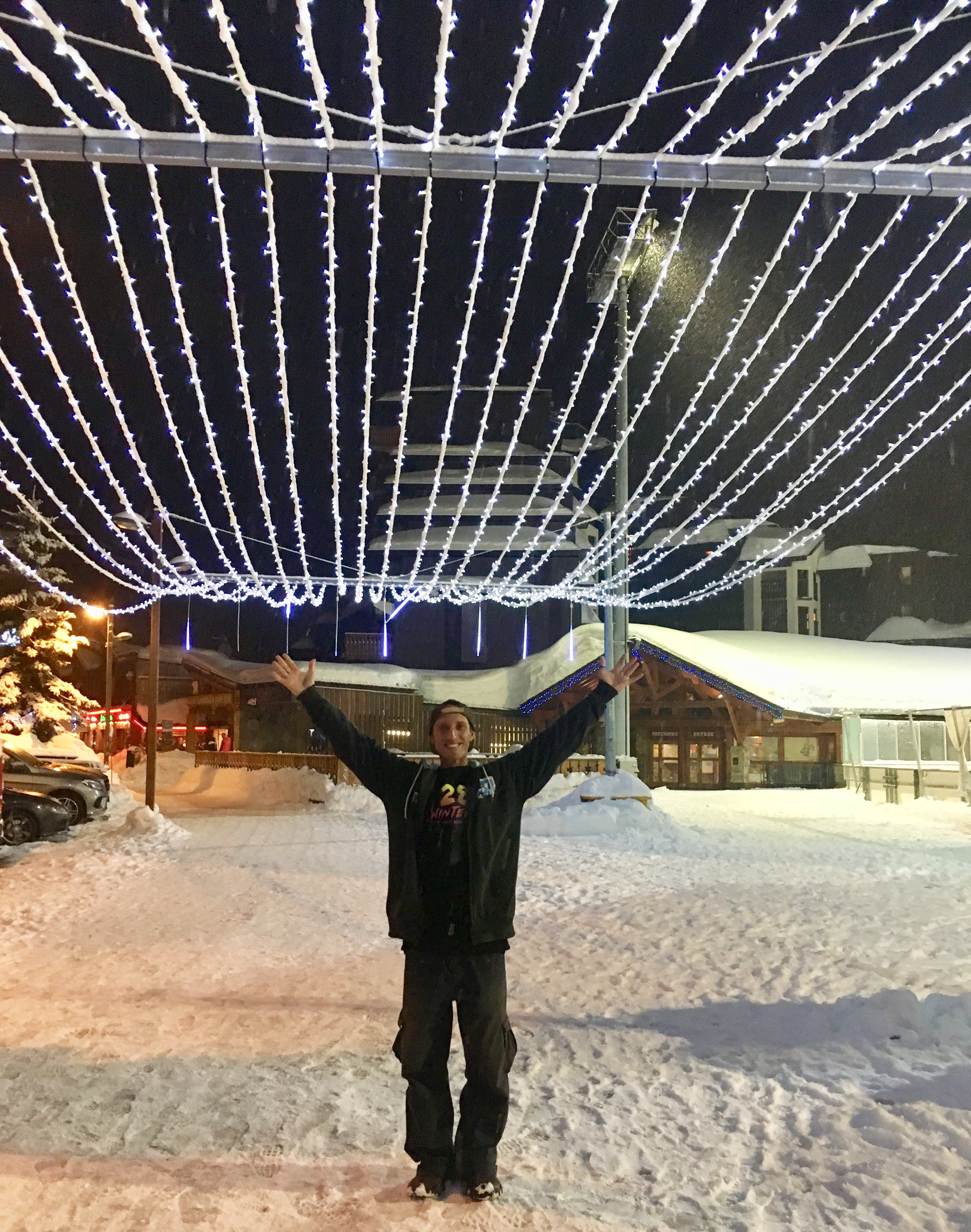

Personal information
- Born: 12 December 1974 (age 50); La Tronche, France

Sport
- Sport: Snowboarding

Guillaume Chastagnol (born 12 December 1974) is a French snowboarder. He competed in the men's halfpipe event at the 1998 Winter Olympics.
