= Derek Heidt =

Canadian snowboarder

Personal information
- Born: 8 September 1975 (age 49); Calgary, Alberta, Canada

Sport
- Sport: Snowboarding

Derek Heidt (born 8 September 1975) is a Canadian snowboarder. He competed in the men's halfpipe event at the 1998 Winter Olympics.
