= Max Ploetzeneder =

Austrian snowboarder

Personal information
- Nationality: Austrian
- Born: 5 April 1971 (age 55) Singapore

Sport
- Sport: Snowboarding

Max Ploetzeneder (born 5 April 1971) is an Austrian snowboarder. He competed in the men's halfpipe event at the 1998 Winter Olympics.
