= Shinichi Watanabe (snowboarder) =

Japanese snowboarder (born 1977)

Personal information
- Nationality: Japanese
- Born: 17 March 1977 (age 48); Sapporo, Japan

Sport
- Sport: Snowboarding

Shinichi Watanabe (born 17 March 1977) is a Japanese snowboarder. He competed in the men's halfpipe event at the 1998 Winter Olympics.
