= Takamasa Imai =

Japanese snowboarder (born 1976)

Personal information
- Nationality: Japanese
- Born: 3 November 1976 (age 48); Gunma, Japan

Sport
- Sport: Snowboarding
- Event: Half-pipe

Takamasa Imai (born 3 November 1976) is a Japanese snowboarder. He competed in the men's halfpipe event at the 1998 Winter Olympics.
