= Ron Chiodi =

American snowboarder (born 1974)

Personal information
- Born: November 24, 1974 (age 51) Fairport, New York, United States

Sport
- Sport: Snowboarding

Ron Chiodi (born November 24, 1974) is an American former snowboarder. He attended high school in Fairport, New York, where he first gained attention as a pole valuter. He later turned to snowboarding, competing in the sport from 1996 to 2003. He competed in the men's halfpipe event at the 1998 Winter Olympics.
