= Anita Schwaller =

Swiss snowboarder

Personal information
- Nationality: Swiss
- Born: 2 May 1975 (age 51) Innsbruck, Austria

Sport
- Country: Switzerland
- Sport: Snowboarding
Medal record
Women's snowboarding
Representing Switzerland
World Championships
Gold medal – first place	1997 Innichen	Halfpipe

Anita Schwaller (born 2 May 1975) is a Swiss snowboarder.

She was born in Innsbruck, Austria. She competed at the 1998 Winter Olympics, in halfpipe. She won a gold medal in halfpipe at the FIS Snowboarding World Championships 1997.
