= Gian Simmen =

Swiss snowboarder

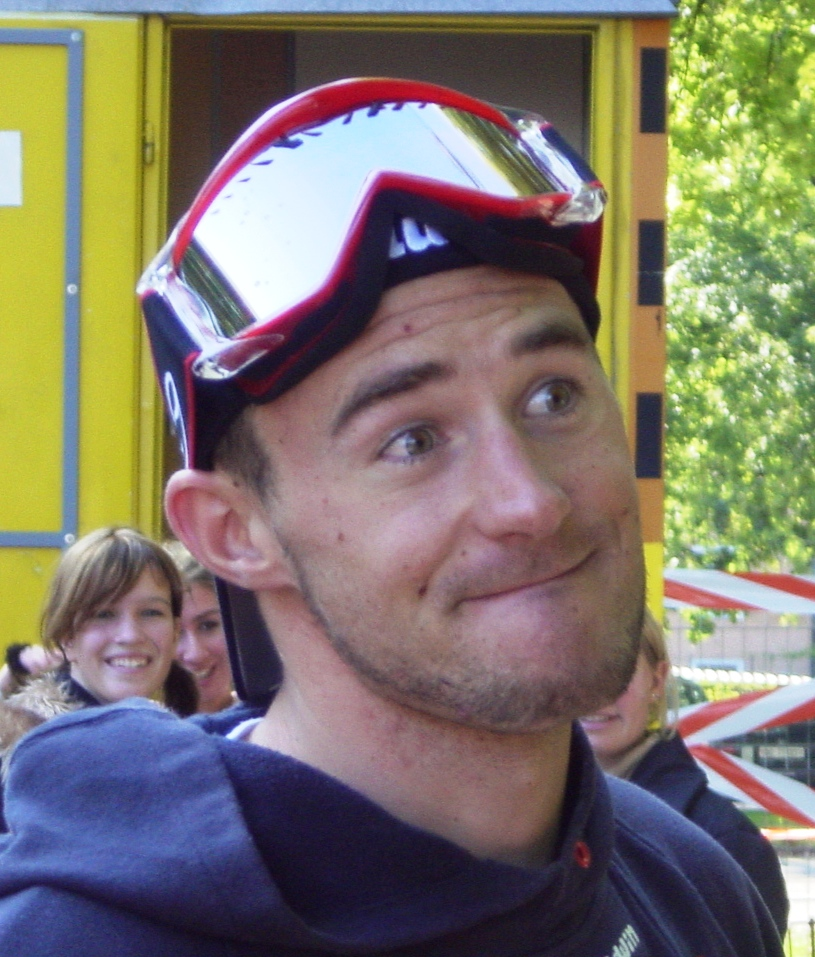

Medal record

Men's snowboarding

Representing Switzerland

Olympic Games
Gold medal – first place	1998 Nagano	Men's halfpipe

Gian Simmen (born 19 February 1977) is a Swiss snowboarder. In Snowboarding at the 1998 Winter Olympics, Simmen won Gold in Men's Halfpipe. He competed at the 1998, 2002, and the 2006 Olympics Winter games.
