= Jean Baptiste Charlet =

French snowboarder (born 1978)

Personal information
- Nationality: French
- Born: 31 January 1978 (age 47); Aveyron, France

Sport
- Sport: Snowboarding

Jean Baptiste Charlet (born 31 January 1978) is a French snowboarder. He competed in the men's halfpipe event at the 1998 Winter Olympics.
