= Roger Hjelmstadstuen =

Norwegian snowboarder

Medal record

Representing Norway

Men's Snowboarding

FIS Snowboarding World Championships
| Bronze medal – third place | 1997 Innichen | Halfpipe |

Roger Hjelmstadstuen (born 11 March 1979) is a retired Norwegian snowboarder.

His greatest achievement is a victory in a January 1998 halfpipe event during the 1997-98 FIS Snowboard World Cup circuit. He placed among the top ten four times.

He also won the bronze medal in halfpipe at the FIS Snowboarding World Championships 1997. He also finished 13th at the FIS Snowboarding World Championships 2005, and competed at the 1998 Winter Olympics.

He is now a snowboarding coach.
