= Satu Järvelä =

Finnish snowboarder

Personal information
- Nationality: Finnish
- Born: 4 October 1977 (age 47); Helsinki, Finland

Sport
- Country: Finland
- Sport: Snowboarding

Satu Järvelä (born 4 October 1977) is a Finnish snowboarder.

She was born in Helsinki. She competed at the 1998 Winter Olympics, in women's halfpipe.
