= Patrik Hasler (snowboarder) =

Swiss snowboarder

Personal information
- Nationality: Swiss
- Born: 13 July 1965 (age 59)

Sport
- Sport: Snowboarding

Patrik Hasler (born 13 July 1965) is a Swiss snowboarder. He competed in the men's halfpipe event at the 1998 Winter Olympics.
