= Sanna-Leena Perunka =

Finnish biathlete (born 1976)

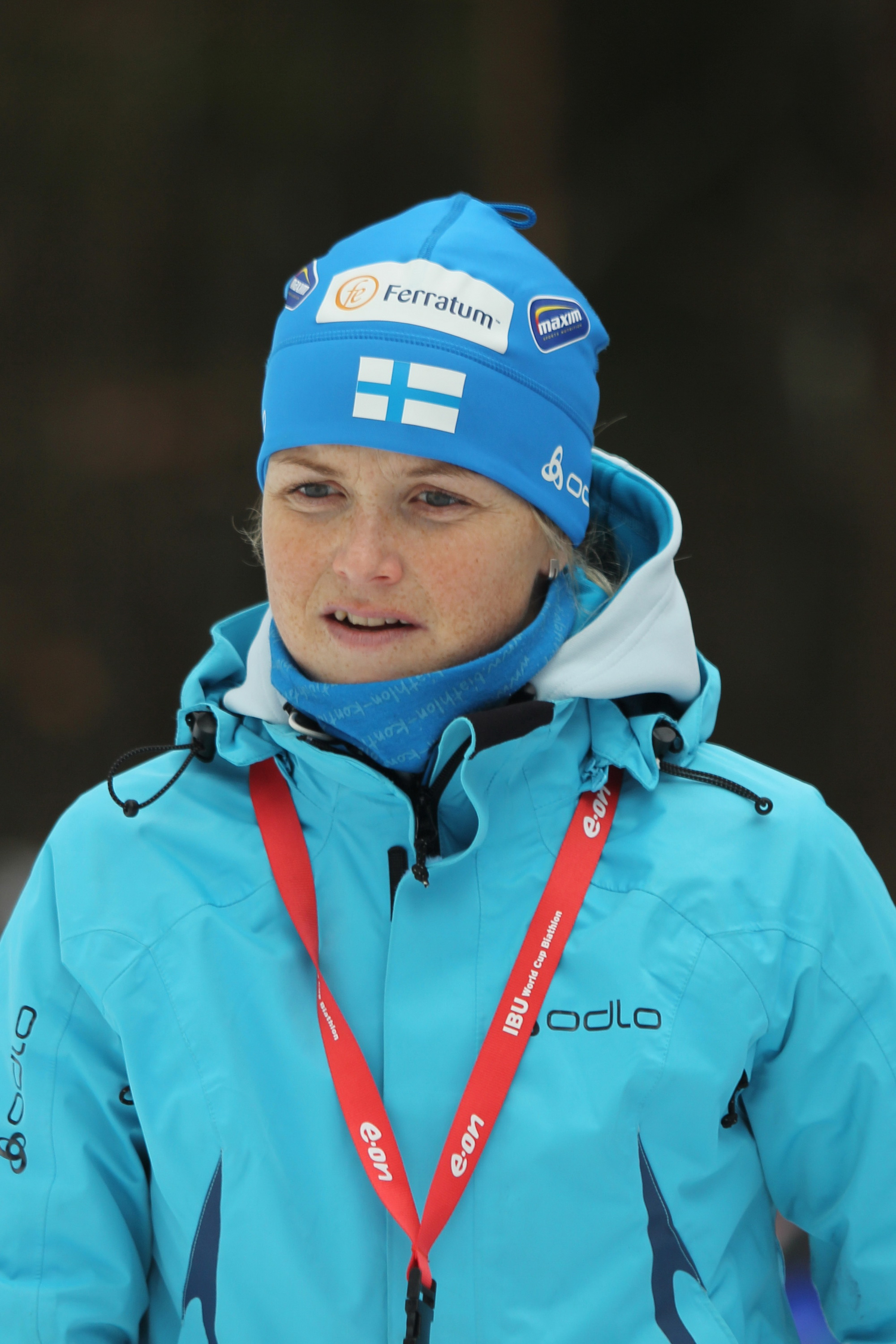
- Sanna-Leena Perunka in 2011

Personal information
- Nationality: Finnish
- Born: 23 September 1976 (age 49) Rovaniemi, Finland

Sport
- Sport: Biathlon

Sanna-Leena Perunka (born 23 September 1976) is a Finnish biathlete. She competed in four events at the 2002 Winter Olympics.
