= Álvaro Gijón =

Spanish skier (born 1976)

Personal information
- Nationality: Spanish
- Born: 27 April 1976 (age 48); Granada, Spain

Sport
- Sport: Cross-country skiing

Álvaro Gijón (born 27 April 1976) is a Spanish cross-country skier. He competed in the men's 10 kilometre classical event at the 1998 Winter Olympics.
