= André Charlet =

French ice hockey player

- Born: 23 April 1898; Chamonix, France
- Died: 24 November 1954 (aged 56); Chamonix, France
- Position: Defence
- National team: France
- Playing career: 1920–1931

André Fernand Charlet (23 April 1898 – 24 November 1954) was a French ice hockey player. He competed in the men's tournaments at the 1924 Winter Olympics and the 1928 Winter Olympics.
