= Michael Michalchuk =

Canadian snowboarder (born 1977)

Michael Michalchuk (born April 20, 1977, in Victoria, British Columbia) is a Canadian professional snowboarder based in Pemberton, British Columbia. Michalchuk has competed in two Winter Olympic Games in 1998 and 2002, along with several world cups but has been often restricted by injury. He is also notable for being one of the first known snowboarders to complete a successful double back flip in a halfpipe competition, has several snowboarding moves named after him and has at times been regarded as arguably the most spectacular, daring half-pipe rider in Pemberton.

Michalchuk stands 5 ft 8 in (1.73 m) tall and he rides with a goofy stance.

== Snowboarding career ==
Michalchuk first entered the world professional snowboarding circuit in 1998 at the age of twenty-one after he gained qualification for the 1998 Winter Olympics as a member of the Canadian team. During the games he qualified for the finals with an equal best score but his performance dropped and he eventually finished in 8th position. During the 1998 season he achieved his highest placement during that year's world cup in the United States, finishing third in the half-pipe event.

The following seasons became mostly disappointing ones for Michalchuk after he was plagued by several injuries, including blowing out his right knee and a recurring achilles tendon injury and it was not until 2001 before he could again compete on a regular basis. His only glory during this time came at the end of 2000 when competing in the Nike All Conditions Gear Indoor competition he won first place after landing a "near flawless" double back flip during the quarter-pipe competition and taking home a car and $32,000 in prize money.

In 2001 Michalchuk was injury free and competed in nearly a full half-pipe world cup circuit where he achieved several top-ten positions including taking a third placing during the event in Whistler.

Michalchuk gained 2002 Winter Olympic qualification after a strong performance in Alpe d'Huez, France in early 2002 but after making his second Olympics he performed poorly failing to qualify for the finals in the half-pipe event and eventually finished a disappointing twenty-seventh.

Since the 2002 Olympics Michalchuk has been further hampered by injury and his performances have suffered, between 2002 and 2005 he only achieved a sole top ten placing on the world cup circuit and then took the entire 2006 season off from professional touring.

=== Double backflip ===
Michalchuk became the first snowboarder to perform a double back flip in halfpipe competition during 1997 around the time when he first turned professional. After performing the move he gained much media attention and would then often use the move in many professional competitions.

=== The Michalchuk ===
The Michalchuk is a pipe trick invented by Michael Michalchuk in the late 1990s and has emerged as his most lasting legacy in modern snowboarding. It's a wildcat-style back flip off the heelside wall of a half-pipe or quarter-pipe.
