= Jennie Waara =

Swedish snowboarder

Personal information
- Nationality: Swedish
- Born: 10 January 1975 (age 50); Gällivare, Sweden

Sport
- Country: Sweden
- Sport: Snowboarding

Jennie Waara (born 10 January 1975) is a Swedish snowboarder.

She was born in Gällivare. She competed at the 1998 Winter Olympics, in halfpipe.
