= Sergio Bartrina =

Spanish snowboarder (born 1973)

Personal information
- Nationality: Spanish
- Born: 2 December 1973 (age 51)

Sport
- Sport: Snowboarding

Sergio Bartrina (born 2 December 1973) is a Spanish snowboarder. He competed in the men's halfpipe event at the 1998 Winter Olympics.
