= Jussi Oksanen =

Finnish snowboarder

Personal information
- Full name: Jussi Ilmari Oksanen
- Nationality: Finnish
- Born: 9 May 1979 (age 45); Kirkkonummi, Finland

Sport
- Sport: Snowboarding

Jussi Oksanen (born 9 May 1979) is a Finnish former snowboarder. He competed in the men's halfpipe event at the 1998 Winter Olympics.

His son Gabriel Oksanen is a professional football player for Finnish club SJK and for Finland youth national teams.
