= Todd Richards (snowboarder) =

American snowboarder

Todd Richards is a snowboarder from Paxton, Massachusetts. Richards helped introduce "skate style" at a time when the sport was mainly influenced by alpine racing events. Richards grew up skateboarding on the East Coast and translated his skills on four wheels to riding a halfpipe made of snow.

During his career, Richards won multiple US Open halfpipe titles, X Games gold medals, and World Championship firsts. He was a member of the 1998 US Olympic Halfpipe Team in Nagano. In 2003, Richards published an autobiography titled P3: Parks, Pipes, and Powder. He has done color commentary for NBC's coverage of the Torino, Vancouver, Sochi, Pyeongchang, Beijing and Milano-Cortina Olympic Games and has produced a series of webisodes entitled "Todcasts for Quiksilver."

Richards is the subject of a documentary entitled "Me, Myself and I" that was released in 2009.

== Actor ==
He played a former professional snowboarder in the 2001 movie Out Cold.
