= Brett Carpentier =

Canadian snowboarder

Personal information
- Born: 3 June 1975 (age 49); Saint-Jérôme, Quebec, Canada

Sport
- Sport: Snowboarding

Brett Carpentier (born 3 June 1975) is a Canadian snowboarder. He competed at the 1998 Winter Olympics and the 2002 Winter Olympics.
