= Sebu Kuhlberg =

Finnish snowboarder

Personal information
- Nationality: Finnish
- Born: 24 January 1974 (age 51); Helsinki, Finland

Sport
- Sport: Snowboarding

Sebu Kuhlberg (born 24 January 1974) is a Finnish snowboarder. He competed in the men's halfpipe event at the 1998 Winter Olympics.
