= Aleksi Litovaara =

Finnish snowboarder

Personal information
- Full name: Lauri Aleksi Litovaara
- Nationality: Finnish
- Born: 22 April 1976 (age 48); Helsinki, Finland
- Height: 173 cm (5 ft 8 in)
- Weight: 76 kg (168 lb)

Sport
- Sport: Snowboarding

Lauri Aleksi Litovaara (born 22 April 1976) is a Finnish snowboarder. He competed in the men's halfpipe event at the 1998 Winter Olympics. From 2001 to 2010 Litovaara hosted, shot, and produced his own TV show Aleksi Litovaara Snowboarding.
