= Adolphe Charlet =

French sculptor

Adolphe Pierre Charlet
- Born: 22 June 1908; Verdun, France
- Died: 20 March 2009 (aged 100)
- Education: École nationale supérieure des Beaux-Arts
- Occupation: Sculptor

Adolphe Charlet (22 June 1908 – 20 March 2009) was a French sculptor. He won the Prix de Rome in Sculpture in 1938.

== Early life ==
Adolphe Charlet was born on 22 June 1908 in Verdun. He graduated from the École des Beaux-Arts.

== Career ==
Charlet won the Prix de Rome in Sculpture in for Je m'appelle Légion 1938.

== Death ==
Charlet died on 20 March 2009.
