= Alessandra Pescosta =

Italian snowboarder

Personal information
- Nationality: Italian
- Born: 16 May 1973 (age 51); Bolzano, Italy

Sport
- Country: Italy
- Sport: Snowboarding

Alessandra Pescosta (born 16 May 1973) is an Italian snowboarder.

She was born in Bolzano. She competed at the 1998 Winter Olympics, in halfpipe, and also at the 2002 Winter Olympics.
