= Tuomas Grönman =

Finnish ice hockey player

- Born: 22 March 1974 (age 52) Viitasaari, Finland
- Height: 6 ft 3 in (191 cm)
- Weight: 219 lb (99 kg; 15 st 9 lb)
- Position: Defenceman
- Shot: Right
- Played for: Lukko; TPS; Chicago Blackhawks; Pittsburgh Penguins; Jokerit
- National team: Finland
- NHL draft: 29th overall, 1992; Quebec Nordiques
- Playing career: 1991–2003

Tuomas Oskar Grönman (born 22 March 1974) is a Finnish former professional ice hockey player who played in the National Hockey League and SM-liiga.

== Playing career ==
Grönman was drafted in the second round of the 1992 NHL entry draft by the Quebec Nordiques. After spending 4 years in Finland developing his skills, the Nordiques still owned his negotiating rights but Gronman was not offered a professional contract. Soon after, the Quebec franchise moved to Colorado, becoming the Avalanche; Gronman's NHL negotiating rights were traded to the Chicago Blackhawks by the Colorado Avalanche on 10 July 1996, in exchange for the Chicago Blackhawks' second-round pick in the 1998 NHL Entry Draft. Colorado selected Philippe Sauvé with that pick.

A little more than a year later on 27 October 1997, the Blackhawks traded Gronman to the Pittsburgh Penguins in exchange for veteran forward Greg Johnson. On 18 October 1998, while playing in a game for Pittsburgh's farm team, the Kansas City Blades of the IHL, Gronman suffered a significant knee injury causing him to miss the majority of the 1998-1999 IHL season. Soon after Gronman's contract expired, and with no NHL or minor league interest his professional North American career was over. He returned overseas and played for TPS, Lukko and Jokerit. Gronman would also help Finland win a bronze medal at the 1998 Winter Olympics.

== Career statistics ==
=== Regular season and playoffs ===
			Regular season					Playoffs
Season	Team	League	GP	G	A	Pts	PIM	GP	G	A	Pts	PIM
1990–91	Lukko	FIN U20	25	10	15	25	14	—	—	—	—	—
1991–92	Tacoma Rockets	WHL	61	5	18	23	102	4	0	1	1	2
1992–93	Lukko	FIN U20	1	0	0	0	0	—	—	—	—	—
1992–93	Lukko	SM-l	45	2	11	13	46	3	1	0	1	2
1993–94	Lukko	SM-l	44	4	12	16	60	9	0	1	1	14
1994–95	TPS	FIN U20	1	0	0	0	0	—	—	—	—	—
1994–95	TPS	SM-l	47	4	20	24	66	12	3	3	6	43
1995–96	TPS	SM-l	32	5	7	12	85	11	1	4	5	16
1996–97	Indianapolis Ice	IHL	51	5	16	21	89	4	1	1	2	6
1996–97	Chicago Blackhawks	NHL	16	0	1	1	13	—	—	—	—	—
1997–98	Indianapolis Ice	IHL	6	0	3	3	6	—	—	—	—	—
1997–98	Pittsburgh Penguins	NHL	22	1	2	3	25	1	0	0	0	0
1997–98	Syracuse Crunch	AHL	33	6	14	20	45	—	—	—	—	—
1998–99	Kansas City Blades	IHL	4	0	0	0	0	—	—	—	—	—
1999–2000	Jokerit	SM-l	51	1	9	10	72	1	0	0	0	0
2000–01	Lukko	SM-l	25	0	4	4	74	3	0	0	0	14
2001–02	Lukko	SM-l	18	0	2	2	26	—	—	—	—	—
2002–03	TPS	SM-l	52	3	6	9	85	7	0	0	0	8
SM-l totals			314	19	71	90	514	46	5	8	13	97
NHL totals			38	1	3	4	38	1	0	0	0	0

=== International ===
Medal record

Ice hockey

Representing Finland

Olympic Games
Bronze medal – third place	1998 Nagano	

World U18 Championships
Bronze medal – third place	1991 Czechoslovakia	

Year	Team	Event	Result	GP	G	A	Pts	PIM
1991	Finland	EJC	3rd place, bronze medalist(s)	6	1	1	2	4
1992	Finland	WJC	4th	7	1	0	1	10
1992	Finland	EJC	4th	6	2	2	4	4
1993	Finland	WJC	5th	7	1	2	3	14
1994	Finland	WJC	4th	7	0	4	4	10
1998	Finland	OG	3rd place, bronze medalist(s)	4	0	0	0	2
Junior totals				33	5	9	14	42
Senior totals				4	0	0	0	2
