= Juha Alm =

Finnish cross-country skier (born 1969)

Personal information
- Nationality: Finnish
- Born: 2 May 1969 (age 57) Rovaniemi, Finland

Sport
- Sport: Skiing
- Club: Rovaniemen Maratonhiihtäjät

World Cup career
- Seasons: 5 – (1995–1999)
- Indiv. starts: 12
- Indiv. podiums: 0
- Team starts: 3
- Team podiums: 0
- Overall titles: 0 – (94th in 1998)
- Discipline titles: 0

Juha Alm (born 2 May 1969) is a Finnish cross-country skier. He competed in the 50 kilometre freestyle event at the 1998 Winter Olympics.

== Cross-country skiing results ==
All results are sourced from the International Ski Federation (FIS).

=== Olympic Games ===
Year	Age	10 km	Pursuit	30 km	50 km	4 × 10 km relay
1998	28	—	—	—	54	—

=== World Cup ===
==== Season standings ====
Season	Age			
Season	Age	Overall	Long Distance	Sprint
1995	25	NC	—N/a	—N/a
1996	26	NC	—N/a	—N/a
1997	27	NC	NC	—
1998	28	94	65	—
1999	29	NC	NC	—
