= Laurent Charlet =

French geochemist (born 1955)

- Born: September 22, 1955 (age 70); Paris, France
- Education: University of California, National Agronomy Institute (Rennes)
- Spouse: Barbara Dehn
- Awards: CNRS Silver medal, France (2007); Hitchon Award, IAGC (2010); University of Swansea honorary Chair, UK (2015)
- Scientific career
- Fields: Geochemistry
- Institutions: Université Grenoble Alpes
- Thesis: Adsorption of Some Macronutrient Ions on an Oxisol: An Application of the Triple Layer Model
- Website: www.isterre.fr/annuaire/pages-web-du-personnel/laurent-charlet-1366

Laurent Charlet (born 1955 in Paris, France) is a French environmental molecular geochemist working at the Institute of Earth Science within the University of Grenoble-Alpes (France). In 2007, he was appointed Distinguished Professor to reflect his major scientific achievements. He holds several adjunct or affiliated positions at the Lawrence Berkeley Laboratory (USA), the University of Swansea (Honorary Chair, UK) and the University of Waterloo (Canada). His research interests aim to advance our scientific knowledge for protecting our natural resources like healthy soils and clean water, using subsurface resources responsibly, and developing strategies for resilience in a changing world.

== Early life and education ==
Laurent Charlet was born in Paris within a family of artists (painters, architects, sculptors). He attended a Montessori-like school (Ecole Alsacienne) where he was encouraged to develop an independent thinking. Through his parents, Dr. Charlet cultivated a strong interest for the humanities, his father's favorite field, but also for the science thanks to his mother, who was among the first women to earn an architecture DPLG diploma in France. Dr. Charlet studied at the most prestigious French institutions for his high school and bachelor-lie degree in mathematics and biology (Louis Le Grand, Saint Louis and Henri IV). Later on, he earned a Master in Agronomy Engineering at Agrocampus (Agronomy Institutes), with a specialization in Mediterranean and Desert Agronomy. Concomitantly, he kept practicing music & modern dance Because of his engineering training, Dr. Charlet has always kept a keen interest for working on environmental issues of worldwide societal and health importance, applying a molecular approach to decipher processes occurring at macro scale.

In 1981, Dr Charlet moved to California, USA with a 6-month scholarship at the University of California – Riverside to work under the supervision of Dr. Garrison Sposito. Fascinated by his experience, he decided to stay within the research group of Dr. Sposito to earn a M.S. and a Ph.D. in Soil and Environmental Sciences. Sposito taught him how to conceptualize in a mathematic framework any natural process. His M.S research project examined the sorption of the CaCl^{+} ion pair on clay and its detrimental impact on soil stability in desert agriculture. His Ph.D. project focused on surface chemistry of Amazonia soils exposed to intensive agricultural stress.

In 1986, Dr. Charlet moved back to Europe to work as a postdoctoral research scholar at the Swiss Federal Institute of Aquatic Science and Engineering (EAWAG) within Dr. Werner Stumm's research group. He completed a second postdoc at the University of Bern within Dr. Paul Schindler's research group. While living in Bern, Dr Charlet met and married Dr. Barbara Dehn, a German biologist. They have two children, Alvaro and Anaïs.

== Scientific position and Awards ==
Laurent Charlet became a full professor at the age of 35 while the European Synchrotron Research Facility (ESRF) was under construction in Grenoble. His work involved research at different scales: (i) large scale multidisciplinary field investigations and (ii) molecular level investigations at synchrotron facilities with a special focus on the redox surface chemistry of nanoparticles, particularly for oxyanion trace elements and their importance in human health, origin of life and environmental safety.

In 2007 Dr. Charlet was awarded the CNRS Silver Medal for Excellence in Research. He was given visiting professor positions at UC-Berkeley (US), EPFL-Lausanne (Switzerland), and Uni. Utrecht (The Netherlands). Honorary member of the Institut Universitaire de France, he was for 10-years both Editor in Chief of Journal of Hydrology and International Research advisor to UGA Chancellor. He heads since 2018 the International Medical Geology Association French Chapter. He also interacts with archeologists and has been till 2009 member of the Lascaux UNESCO Heritage scientific committee.

== Research Avenues ==
His research focuses on the chemical reactivity of (nano) particles, either natural (soil, sediment and water) or engineered (oncology, nanotechnology or environmental engineering). While continuing his life-long research on soil and deep underground storage issues regarding water quality, he is now collaborating with the medical community to investigate diseases induced by the presence of nanoparticles in the organism (e.g. podoconiosis) or develop treatments. His approach consists in examining trace elements and their speciation at the molecular level in a large variety of biological and environmental media.

Dr. Laurent Charlet's work is based on the development of advanced chemical concepts, methodology and instrumentation methods to investigate biological and geochemical processes governing the chemical speciation and impact on mobility, bioavailability and toxicity of trace elements (Se, As, Sb, Re, Hg) or organic molecules (antibiotics and other waste water treatment plants (WWTP) non treated contaminants) in heterogeneous chemistry. By combining field & toxicological measurements using spectroscopic (μXAFS, ESR, Mössbauer), neutron and X-Ray diffractometric techniques, he contributes to develop new concepts and new tools for the geochemical community working on water quality, paleoenvironmental reconstruction, environment risk assessment, or geomedicine.

• Mineral particles surface chemistry

Natural nanomaterial such as clays and oxides can store large amounts of major and trace elements (either bioessential or toxic). After many years investigating clays, calcite and Fe and Mn oxide surface chemistry, Dr. Laurent Charlet shifted his research focus on redox sensitive minerals such as magnetite, pyrite, mackinawite which structure which could have participated to the emergence of life. Examining the surface reactivity of such iron and manganese nanoparticles and pyrite−greigite nanocomposite when exposed to highly toxic contaminants present in water (e.g., Se, As, and Sb oxyanions) contributes to the development of new remediation and filtration techniques, but also to our understanding of particle toxicity.

• Cancer nanotherapeutics, nanotoxicity and trace element deficiency

Dr. Laurent Charlet's research aims to study both the impact of trace element deficiency on human health (e.g., impact of selenium deficiency on osteoarthrosis, thyroid cancer and Keshin Beck disease), and, conversely, the use of nanoparticles as therapeutic agents (e.g., in fighting ovarian and prostate cancer), where selenium nanoparticles were shown to play a direct role in histone methylation. Other nanomaterials to have a toxicity depending on their diameter (e.g., the silver nanowires to be used in display screens) or on the reactivity of surface iron atoms (e.g., in asbestos used for many years).

• Hydrogen, Water and Waste Geological Storage

Hydrogen. Efficient, large-scale, and long-duration energy storage for intermittent renewable energy sources is a critical unsolved problem for the expansion of carbon-free electricity. Underground hydrogen storage (UHS) coupled to reversible water splitting and hydrogen oxidation has the potential to play a significant role in grid-scale energy storage. Dr. Charlet has proposed an innovative approach to UHS, through the study of hydrogen on clay showing various water content, that will provide new opportunities for deployment of hydrogen storage and integration into energy and electricity systems.

Water. The Sponge City concept, popularized by Dr Yu Kongjian (Peking University), corresponds to future cities that do not act like an impermeable system, but allow water to filter through the ground, like a sponge absorbing rain water, particularly flash flood water (in dry areas) or water outflow from treatment plants (e.g. after reverse osmosis treatment in Los Angeles after 2035). Dr. Charlet contributes to this research by exploring the impact of natural contamination, their removal by passive filtration systems and the potential of bioremediation techniques that will allow the removal of emerging contaminants and the recharge urban aquifers with high quality waters. Dr. Charlet's research contributes also to the treatment of urban and industrial wastewater. Two major worldwide environmental issues are being investigated: (i) the immobilization by clay and biochars of antibiotics and other organics common organic micropollutants present in surface water not addressed by WWTP and (ii) the decontamination of phosphogypsum stack effluents.

Nuclear waste. The safety of radioactive waste geological storage remains a major challenge. Vitrified waste steel canisters will be stored either in a > 300 m thick clay rock, or in granite surrounded by a clay and concrete “near field” barrier. Dr. Charlet team has shown that radioactive oxyanions are sorbed on edge face of clay minerals and concrete component, leading via redox reaction to the immobilization of otherwise extremely mobile radionuclides such as ^{79}Se and high valence ^{235,238}U. In addition, iron sulfides, that both exist in granitic and claystone host rocks or are formed during canister during steel corrosion, are key actors in controlling the redox potential and inhibiting the transport of redox-sensitive radionuclides.

• Paleoenvironments and Archeology

Trace elements can be used as proxies to reconstruct environmental or human histories. Their geochemical signatures can be stored in natural archives or archeological artefacts. Dr. Charlet and his collaborators showed the impact of early Bronze Age and medieval metallurgy in the Alps and later the rise (and impact) of cement industry. He also showed how, depending on climate, well crystalline vs. granular calcite can respectively protect or obliterate prehistorical wall paintings.

Please see research details: www.isterre.fr/annuaire/pages-web-du-personnel/laurent-charlet-1366/article/research.html.

== Papers ==
As of January 2022, Laurent Charlet is co-author to 213 peer reviewed international journal papers, and another 200 publications of various types, with total 20,000 citations and an h-index of 75. They can be found at the ORCID orcid.org/0000-0003-3669-7316.

== MOOC and conferences ==
Laurent Charlet has emerged as a science communicator on the web, as he developed, together with Prof. R. Latmani at EPFL, an EdX-MOOC entitled: “Water Quality: the Bio-Geo-Chemical Engine”, given on line since 2019, and he gives regular lectures in China and USA.

Laurent Charlet presents regularly his work at geochemistry (Goldschmidt 2021), chemistry (ACS Fall 2021 and Spring 2022), ecological engineering (ACEER 21), food and nutrition (VirtualFood 22) and toxicology (Toxico 2022) international conferences, in Lyon, Atlanta, San Diego, Beijing, London and Barcelona respectively.
