= Sari Grönholm =

Finnish snowboarder

Personal information
- Nationality: Finnish
- Born: 4 June 1980 (age 44); Uusimaa, Finland

Sport
- Country: Finland
- Sport: Snowboarding

Sari Grönholm (born 4 June 1980) is a Finnish snowboarder. She was born in Uusimaa. She competed at the 2002 Winter Olympics, in women's halfpipe.
