= Kirsi Rautava =

Finnish snowboarder

Personal information
- Nationality: Finnish
- Born: 22 June 1978 (age 46); Kajaani, Finland

Sport
- Sport: Snowboarding

Kirsi Rautava (born 22 June 1978) is a Finnish snowboarder. She competed in the women's halfpipe event at the 2002 Winter Olympics.
