= Henna Raita =

Finnish alpine skier (born 1975)

Henna Raita (24 January 1975 in Lahti, Finland) is a former alpine skier.

Raita has been part of the Finnish Alpine skiing team since the 1990s. She got her first World Cup points during the 1999–2000 season in Copper Mountain, USA when she was 13th in slalom.

She competed in three Olympic Games between 1998 and 2006, with an 8th placing in the Women's Slalom at the Salt Lake City Games in 2002 her best result.

Raita stands 1.73 metres (5 ft 8 in) tall.

She retired in 2006 and nowadays makes music using the artist name Hehewuti.
