= Anita Nyman =

Finnish cross-country skier

Personal information
- Nationality: Finland
- Born: 15 September 1971 (age 54)

Sport
- Sport: Skiing
- Club: Hollolan Urheilijat - 46

World Cup career
- Seasons: 6 – (1993, 1996–2000)
- Indiv. starts: 25
- Indiv. podiums: 0
- Team starts: 6
- Team podiums: 0
- Overall titles: 0 – (50th in 1997)
- Discipline titles: 0

Anita Nyman (born 15 September 1971) is a Finnish cross-country skier who competed from 1993 to 2005. Competing at the 1998 Winter Olympics in Nagano, she finished seventh in the 4 × 5 km relay and 44th in the 5 km + 10 km combined pursuit.

Nyman's finished 26th in the 15 km event at the 1999 FIS Nordic World Ski Championships at Ramsau. Her best World Cup finish was 17th in a 10 km event in Japan in 1997.

Nyman's best individual career finish was third in a 5 km Continental Cup event in Finland in 1995.

== Cross-country skiing results ==
All results are sourced from the International Ski Federation (FIS).

=== Olympic Games ===
Year	Age	5 km	15 km	Pursuit	30 km	4 × 5 km relay
1998	26	56	—	44	DNS	7

=== World Championships ===
Year	Age	5 km	15 km	Pursuit	30 km	4 × 5 km relay
1999	27	—	26	—	DNF	11

=== World Cup ===
==== Season standings ====
Season	Age				
Season	Age	Overall	Long Distance	Middle Distance	Sprint
1993	21	NC	—N/a	—N/a	—N/a
1996	24	NC	—N/a	—N/a	—N/a
1997	25	50	NC	—N/a	38
1998	26	60	NC	—N/a	66
1999	27	57	38	—N/a	—
2000	28	69	NC	NC	49
