= Nicola Thost =

German snowboarder (born 1981)

Medal record

Representing Germany

Women's snowboarding

Olympic Games
Gold medal – first place	1998 Nagano	Halfpipe

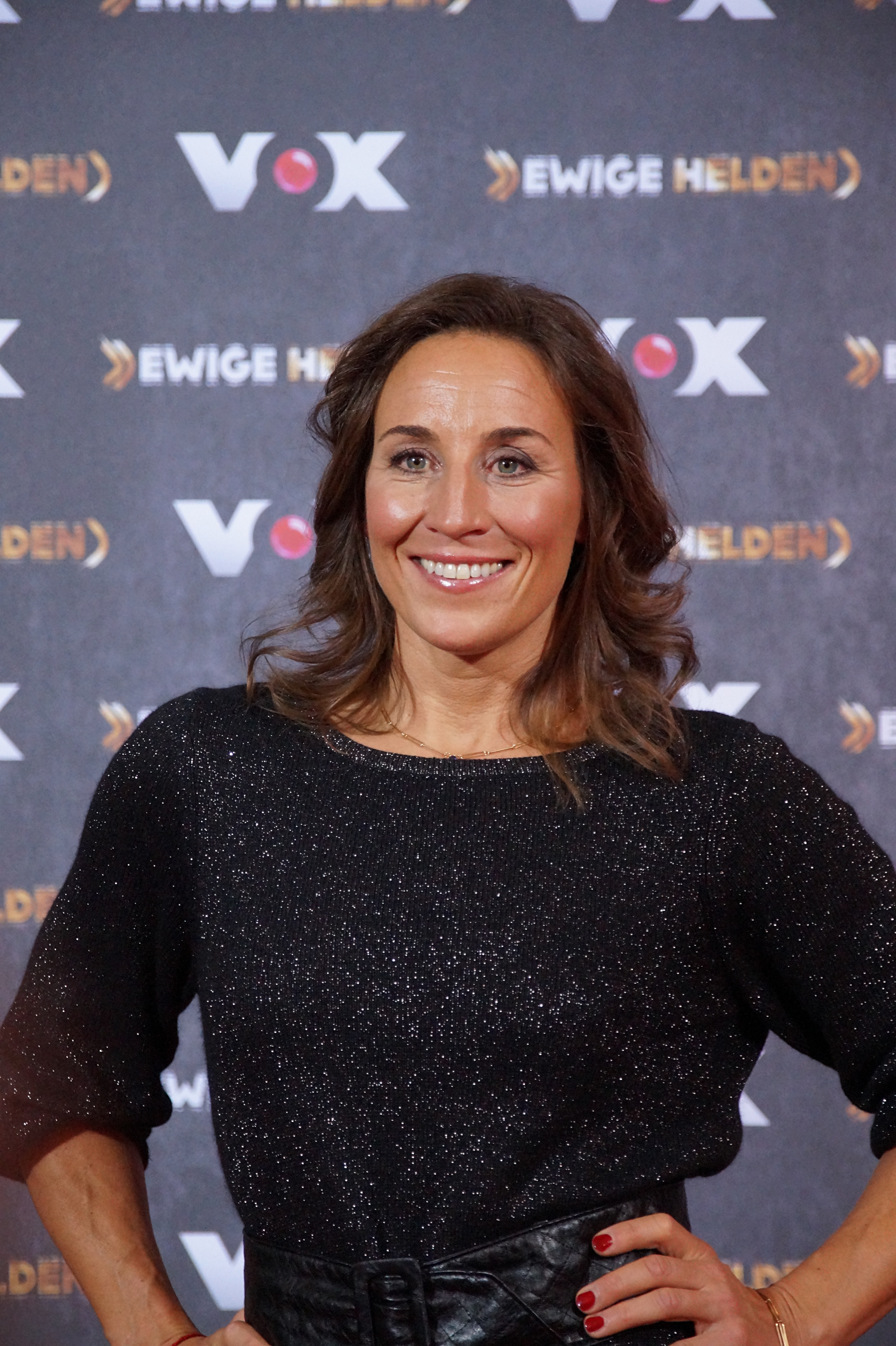
Nicola Thost in 2015

Nicola Thost (born 3 May 1981) is a German snowboarder and Olympic champion. She won a gold medal at the 1998 Winter Olympics in Nagano.

== Life and career ==
Thost grew up participating in gymnastics and skiing, but switched to snowboarding at age 13. At the 1998 Winter Olympics in Nagano, she won the gold medal in the inaugural halfpipe event. She also competed in the 2002 Winter Olympics in Salt Lake City but did not make the podium, finishing in 11th place.
