= Fabien Rohrer =

Swiss snowboarder

Personal information
- Nationality: Swiss
- Born: 1 September 1975 (age 49); Bern, Switzerland

Sport
- Sport: Snowboarding

Fabien Rohrer (born 1 September 1975) is a Swiss snowboarder. He competed in the men's halfpipe event at the 1998 Winter Olympics.
