= Daniel Franck =

Norwegian snowboarder (born 1974)

Medal record

Men's snowboarding

Representing Norway

Olympic Games
Silver medal – second place	1998 Nagano	Men's halfpipe

FIS Snowboarding World Championships
Silver medal – second place	2001 Madonna di Campiglio	Halfpipe

Daniel Franck (born 9 December 1974) is a Norwegian professional snowboarder. In Snowboarding at the 1998 Winter Olympics, he won Silver in Men's Halfpipe.

== Career ==
Franck was born and raised in Gjerdum, Norway. He started riding in 1991, and began competing professionally in 1993. After winning the National and Nordic championships, he began competing in world cup events in 1993. Franck won his first international championship Gold at the European championships in 1995, and earned 2nd. place at the World Cup Ranking the 1995–96 season. He won the silver medal in the inaugural men's halfpipe competition in the 1998 Winter Olympics in Nagano, Japan. He also participated in the 2002 Winter Olympics in Salt Lake City, Utah, where he finished 9th. place, after riding with a concussion from a crash in his last practice run. Franck was the first snowboarding athlete to win gold at the ESPN X-Games in Snow Summit – California – in 1997, where he also took the Silver medal in the slope style contest.

In the 1999–2000 season he won the World Championships, European Championships and the World Cup overall, a record that still stands today. Franck, has earned 16 world cup wins, 11 Championship medals and more than 40 international podiums in his career. He is also known as "The Slippery Hotdog" because of his effortless style and ghost-like disappearance. Franck was in a computer game known as XGames Pro Boarder and Transworld Snowboarding.

Daniel Franck is still riding, but retired from the competition scene in 2008. He runs his own clothing company which carries his name. They launched in 2009 with 34 pieces. He is mentioned in the Mack Dawg Productions, Double Decade as one of the most progressive riders of all time. He can be seen in the following productions: "Upping The Ante", "Melt Down Project", TB2 & TB3 (Standard Films), "Technical Difficulties", "Stomping Grounds" and more.
