= Shannon Dunn-Downing =

American snowboarder

Personal information
- Born: November 26, 1972 (age 53)
Medal record
Women's snowboarding
Representing the United States
Olympic Games
| Bronze medal – third place | 1998 Nagano | Halfpipe |
Winter X Games
| Gold medal – first place | 1997 | Halfpipe |
| Gold medal – first place | 2001 | Superpipe |
| Silver medal – second place | 1999 | Halfpipe |
| Silver medal – second place | 2001 | Slopestyle |

Shannon Dunn-Downing (born November 26, 1972) is an American snowboarder and Olympic medalist. She received a bronze medal in the halfpipe event at the 1998 Winter Olympics in Nagano, becoming the first American woman to win a medal in snowboarding. She finished 5th at the 2002 Winter Olympics in Salt Lake City. She won a gold medal at the first Winter X Games in California 1997, and again in 2001.

== History ==
Dunn-Downing started snowboarding in 1988 in Steamboat Springs, CO where she grew up, and began competing in the early 1990s.

She was the first woman to land several difficult halfpipe tricks in competition, including a frontside 540 in 1991, backside 540 in 1994, McTwist in 1994, frontside 720 in 1995, and frontside rodeo 720 in 2001.

In the mid-2000s Dunn-Downing retired from professional snowboarding.

== Results ==
- 1st Place '02 USSA Grand Prix Halfpipe, Mammoth Mountain, CA (Dec.16)
- 1st Place '02 USSA Grand Prix Halfpipe, Mammoth Mountain, CA (Dec.13)
- 5th Place '02 Olympic Winter Games Halfpipe, Park City, UT
- 1st Place '01 Winter X Games Halfpipe, Mount Snow, VT
- 2nd Place '01 Winter X Games Slopestyle, Mount Snow, VT
- 2nd Place '01 US Open Halfpipe, Stratton Mountain, VT
- 1st Place '00 USSA Grand Prix Halfpipe, Northstart at Tahoe, CA
- 1st Place '00 USSA Grand Prix Halfpipe, Breckenridge Mountain Resort, CO
- 1st Place '00 USSA Grand Prix Halfpipe, Mammoth Mountain, CA
- 2nd Place '00 Nippon Open Halfpipe, Hakuba, Japan
- 2nd Place '00 US Open Halfpipe, Stratton Mountain, VT
- 1st Place '99 FIS World Cup Halfpipe, Mount Bachelor, OR
- 2nd Place '99 Winter X Games Halfpipe, Crested Butte, CO
- 1st Place '99 USSA Grand Prix Halfpipe, Mount Bachelor, OR
- 1st Place '99 USSA Grand Prix Halfpipe, Copper Mountain, CO
- 1st Place '99 Nippon Open Halfpipe, Hokkaido, Japan
- 3rd Place '99 US Open Halfpipe, Stratton Mountain, VT
- 1st Place '99 USSA Super Prix Halfpipe and Overall, Okemo Mountain, VT
- Bronze Medalist '98 Olympic Winter Games, Halfpipe, Yamanouchi Mountain, Nagano, Japan
- 1st Place '97 Winter X Games Halfpipe, Crested Butte, CO
- 1st Place '94 US Open Halfpipe, Stratton Mountain, VT
- 1st Place '93 US Open Halfpipe, Stratton Mountain, VT
- 2-time ISF World Halfpipe Champion
