= Olli-Pekka Peltola =

Finnish biathlete

Personal information
- Nationality: Finnish
- Born: 8 September 1969 (age 56) Kyyjärvi, Finland

Sport
- Sport: Biathlon

Olli-Pekka Peltola (born 8 September 1969) is a Finnish biathlete. He competed at the 1998 Winter Olympics and the 2002 Winter Olympics. In the 1997/98 season, he achieved a 94% shooting accuracy in personal races. Sturla Holm Lægreid matched this record only 28 years later.
