= Markus Hurme =

Finnish snowboarder

Personal information
- Nationality: Finnish
- Born: 1 February 1978 (age 47); Vantaa, Finland

Sport
- Sport: Snowboarding

Markus Hurme (born 1 February 1978) is a Finnish snowboarder. He competed in the men's halfpipe event at the 1998 Winter Olympics.
