= Sabine Wehr-Hasler =

German snowboarder

Personal information
- Nationality: German
- Born: 2 August 1967 (age 57); Offenbach am Main, West Germany

Sport
- Country: Germany
- Sport: Snowboarding

Sabine Wehr-Hasler (born 2 August 1967) is a German snowboarder. She was born in Offenbach am Main. She competed at the 1998 Winter Olympics, in halfpipe.
