= Yuri Yoshikawa =

Japanese snowboarder (born 1971)

Personal information
- Nationality: Japanese
- Born: 6 August 1971 (age 53); Osaka, Japan

Sport
- Sport: Snowboarding

Yuri Yoshikawa (born 6 August 1971) is a Japanese snowboarder. She competed at the 1998 Winter Olympics and the 2002 Winter Olympics.
