= Risto Rosendahl =

Finnish speed skater

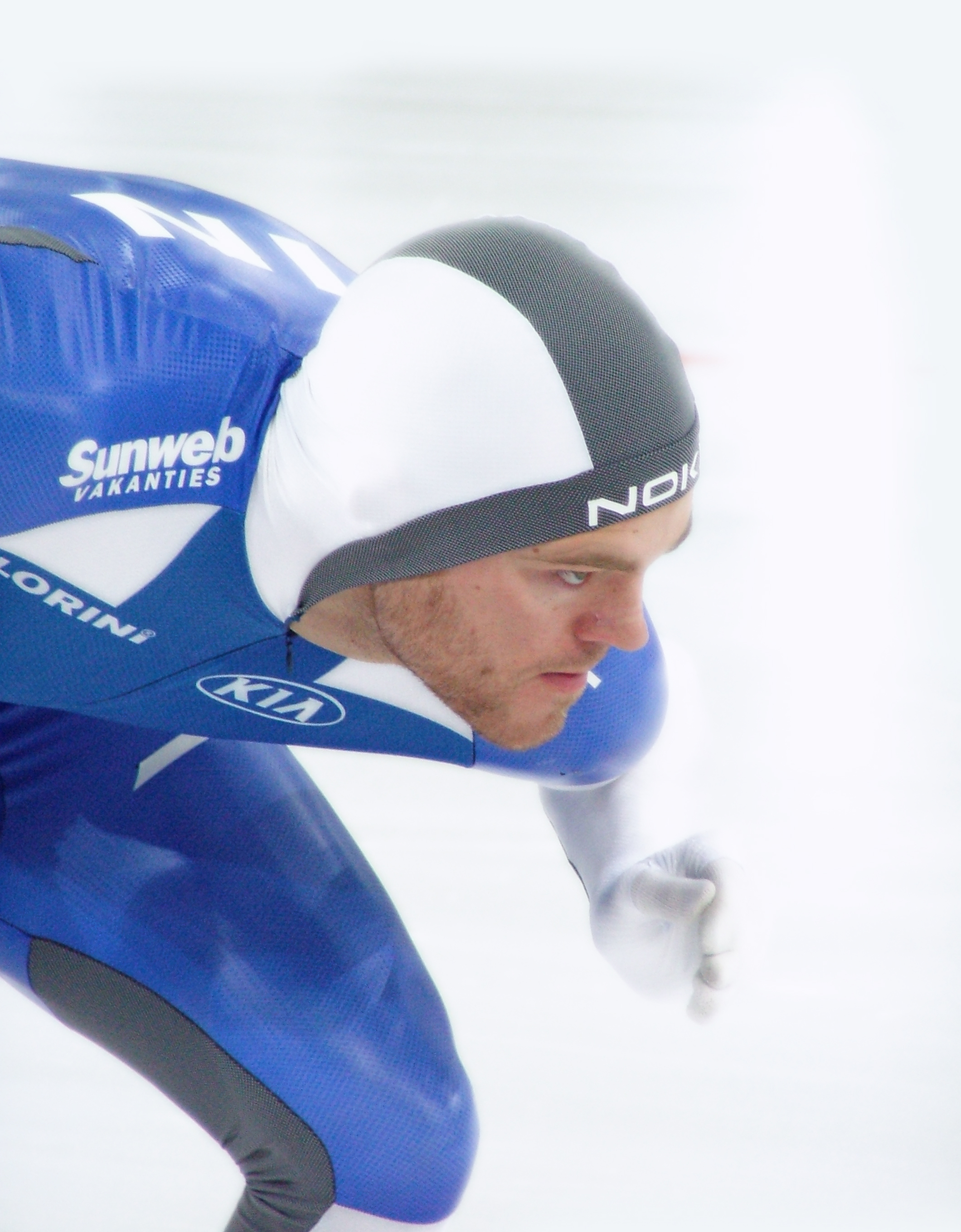
- Risto Rosendahl in 2008

Personal information
- Nationality: Finnish
- Born: 23 November 1979 (age 45); Harjavalta, Finland

Sport
- Sport: Speed skating

Risto Rosendahl (born 23 November 1979) is a Finnish speed skater. He competed at the 2002 Winter Olympics and the 2006 Winter Olympics.
