= Vesa Rosendahl =

Finnish speed skater

Personal information
- Nationality: Finnish
- Born: 5 December 1975 (age 49); Harjavalta, Finland

Sport
- Sport: Speed skating

Vesa Rosendahl (born 5 December 1975) is a Finnish speed skater. He competed in the men's 1500 metres event at the 2002 Winter Olympics.
