= Minna Hesso =

Finnish snowboarder

Personal information
- Nationality: Finnish
- Born: 15 March 1976 (age 49); Vantaa, Finland

Sport
- Country: Finland
- Sport: Snowboarding

Minna Hesso (born 15 March 1976) is a Finnish snowboarder.

She was born in Vantaa. She competed at the 1998 Winter Olympics, in halfpipe, and also at the 2002 Winter Olympics.

Hesso moved to Verbier, Switzerland, in her early twenties.
