= Snowboarding at the 1998 Winter Olympics =

Snowboarding at the XVIII Olympic Winter Games
- Venue: Mount Yakebitai (giant slalom) & Kanbayashi Snowboard Park (halfpipe)
- Dates: 8–12 February 1998
- Competitors: 125 from 22 nations

The snowboarding competition of the 1998 Winter Olympics was held at Mount Yakebitai and Kanbayashi Snowboard Park. The competition took place between 8 and 12 February 1998 and featured four events: Men's and Women's giant slalom and halfpipe.

This was the first Olympic appearance of snowboarding. Although a separate snowboard federation was established in 1994, the International Ski Federation brought snowboard under its jurisdiction with encouragement from the IOC.

== Medal summary ==
=== Medal table ===
Rank	Nation	Gold	Silver	Bronze	Total
1	Germany	1	1	0	2
2	Switzerland	1	0	1	2
3	Canada	1	0	0	1
3	France	1	0	0	1
5	Norway	0	2	0	2
6	Italy	0	1	0	1
7	United States	0	0	2	2
8	Austria	0	0	1	1
Totals (8 entries)		4	4	4	12

=== Men's events ===
Event	Gold		Silver		Bronze	
Giant slalom	Ross Rebagliati; Canada	2:03.96	Thomas Prugger; Italy	2:03.98	Ueli Kestenholz; Switzerland	2:04.08
Halfpipe	Gian Simmen; Switzerland	85.2	Daniel Franck; Norway	82.4	Ross Powers; United States	82.1

=== Women's events ===
Event	Gold		Silver		Bronze	
Giant slalom	Karine Ruby; France	2:17.34	Heidi Renoth; Germany	2:19.17	Brigitte Köck; Austria	2:19.42
Halfpipe	Nicola Thost; Germany	74.6	Stine Brun Kjeldaas; Norway	74.2	Shannon Dunn-Downing; United States	72.8

== Participating nations ==
Twenty-two nations participated in snowboarding at the Nagano Games.

- Argentina (1)
- Australia (1)
- Austria (11)
- Bulgaria (1)
- Canada (12)
- Denmark (1)
- Spain (2)
- Finland (5)
- France (13)
- Germany (8)
- Greece (3)
- Italy (9)
- Japan (7)
- Netherlands (1)
- New Zealand (1)
- Norway (7)
- Poland (3)
- Slovenia (1)
- Slovakia (1)
- Sweden (10)
- Switzerland (12)
- United States (14)
