= Canada at the 1998 Winter Olympics =

- IOC code: CAN
- NOC: Canadian Olympic Committee
- Website: www.olympic.ca (in English and French)

in Nagano, Japan 7 February 1998 – 22 February 1998
- Competitors: 144 (81 men, 63 women) in 12 sports
- Flag bearers: Jean-Luc Brassard (opening); Catriona Le May Doan (closing)
- Medals Ranked 4th: Gold 6 Silver 5 Bronze 4 Total 15

Winter Olympics appearances (overview)
- 1924; 1928; 1932; 1936; 1948; 1952; 1956; 1960; 1964; 1968; 1972; 1976; 1980; 1984; 1988; 1992; 1994; 1998; 2002; 2006; 2010; 2014; 2018; 2022; 2026

Canada competed at the 1998 Winter Olympics in Nagano, Japan. Canada has competed at every Winter Olympic Games.

Canada's biggest story at these games was the failure of the men's ice hockey team to win a medal. For the first time, Canada's best players (professional players from the National Hockey League) were able to compete at the Olympics, so Canadians had high expectations. The team lost its semi-final game to the Czech Republic when goaltender Dominik Hašek stopped all five shots he faced in the tie-breaking shootout. Canada then lost the bronze medal game to Finland.

The women's ice hockey team, on the other hand, captured a silver medal in the first Games to feature the women's event.

For the first time, curling was included as an official event, having been showcased as a demonstration sport at Calgary in 1988, and Albertville in 1992.

Also making the news was Ross Rebagliati's disqualification for marijuana being found in his system and having his gold medal stripped. The IOC reinstated the medal days later.

== Medalists ==
Medal	Name	Sport	Event	Date
Gold	Ross Rebagliati	Snowboarding	Men's giant slalom	8 February
Gold	Catriona Le May Doan	Speed skating	Women's 500 metres	14 February
Gold	Jan Betker; Atina Ford; Marcia Gudereit; Joan McCusker; Sandra Schmirler	Curling	Women's tournament	15 February
Gold	Pierre Lueders; David MacEachern	Bobsleigh	Two-man	15 February
Gold	Annie Perreault	Short track speed skating	Women's 500 metres	19 February
Gold	Eric Bedard; Derrick Campbell; François Drolet; Marc Gagnon	Short track speed skating	Men's 5000 metre relay	21 February
Silver	Jeremy Wotherspoon	Speed skating	Men's 500 metres	10 February
Silver	Susan Auch	Speed skating	Women's 500 metres	14 February
Silver	Elvis Stojko	Figure skating	Men's singles	14 February
Silver	Mike Harris; Richard Hart; George Karrys; Collin Mitchell; Paul Savage	Curling	Men's tournament	15 February
Silver	Canada women's national ice hockey team: Stacey Wilson; Jennifer Botterill; Thérèse Brisson; Cassie Campbell; Judy Diduck; Nancy Drolet; Lori Dupuis; Danielle Goyette; Geraldine Heaney; Jayna Hefford; Becky Kellar; Kathy McCormack; Karen Nystrom; Lesley Reddon; Manon Rhéaume; Laura Schuler; Fiona Smith; France St-Louis; Vicky Sunohara; Hayley Wickenheiser	Ice hockey	Women's tournament	17 February
Bronze	Kevin Overland	Speed skating	Men's 500 metres	10 February
Bronze	Eric Bedard	Short track speed skating	Men's 1000 metres	17 February
Bronze	Christine Boudrias; Isabelle Charest; Annie Perreault; Tania Vicent	Short track speed skating	Women's 3000 metre relay	17 February
Bronze	Catriona Le May Doan	Speed skating	Women's 1000 metres	19 February

Medals by sport
Sport	gold	silver	bronze	Total
Short track speed skating	2	0	2	4
Speed skating	1	2	2	5
Curling	1	1	0	2
Bobsleigh	1	0	0	1
Snowboarding	1	0	0	1
Ice hockey	0	1	0	1
Figure skating	0	1	0	1
Total	6	5	4	15

== Competitors ==
The following is the list of number of competitors in the Games.

Sport	Men	Women	Total
Alpine skiing	5	3	8
Biathlon	2	4	6
Bobsleigh	8	–	8
Cross-country skiing	5	5	10
Curling	5	5	10
Figure skating	6	4	10
Freestyle skiing	7	5	12
Ice hockey	21	20	41
Luge	2	0	2
Short track speed skating	4	4	8
Snowboarding	8	4	12
Speed skating	8	9	17
Total	81	63	144

== Alpine skiing ==
Men

Athlete	Event	Race 1	Race 2	Total	
Athlete	Event	Time	Time	Time	Rank
Brian Stemmle	Downhill			DNF	–
Luke Sauder	Downhill			DNF	–
Kevin Wert	Downhill			1:52.67	19
Ed Podivinsky	Downhill			1:50.71	5
Ed Podivinsky	Super-G			DSQ	–
Brian Stemmle	Super-G			1:36.40	12
Thomas Grandi	Giant Slalom	DSQ	–	DSQ	–
Thomas Grandi	Slalom	DNF	–	DNF	–

Men's combined

Athlete	Slalom		Downhill	Total	
Athlete	Time 1	Time 2	Time	Total time	Rank
Ed Podivinsky	51.48	DNF	–	DNF	–

Women

Athlete	Event	Race 1	Race 2	Total	
Athlete	Event	Time	Time	Time	Rank
Mélanie Turgeon	Downhill			1:31.45	22
Kate Pace-Lindsay	Downhill			1:31.30	19
Kate Pace-Lindsay	Super-G			1:19.89	27
Mélanie Turgeon	Super-G			1:19.20	20
Katerina Tichy	Slalom	47.93	DNF	DNF	–

Women's combined

Athlete	Downhill	Slalom		Total	
Athlete	Time	Time 1	Time 2	Total time	Rank
Mélanie Turgeon	DNF	–	–	DNF	–

== Biathlon ==
Men

Event	Athlete	Misses ^{1}	Time	Rank
10 km Sprint	Kevin Quintilio	3	32:32.6	66
10 km Sprint	Steve Cyr	3	30:35.0	48

Event	Athlete	Time	Misses	Adjusted time ^{2}	Rank
20 km	Kevin Quintilio	1'01:37.2	4	1'05:37.2	64
20 km	Steve Cyr	58:12.9	6	1'04:12.9	55

Women

Event	Athlete	Misses ^{1}	Time	Rank
7.5 km Sprint	Michelle Collard	0	25:26.1	38
7.5 km Sprint	Myriam Bédard	0	25:11.3	32

Event	Athlete	Time	Misses	Adjusted time ^{2}	Rank
15 km	Nikki Keddie	1'03:46.5	5	1'08:46.5	60
15 km	Myriam Bédard	59:44.1	3	1'02:44.1	50

Women's 4 × 7.5 km relay

Athletes	Race		
Athletes	Misses ^{1}	Time	Rank
Kristin Berg; Myriam Bédard; Nikki Keddie; Michelle Collard	3	1'53:15.0	17

^{1} A penalty loop of 150 metres had to be skied per missed target.
^{2} One minute added per missed target.

== Bobsleigh ==
Sled	Athletes	Event	Run 1		Run 2		Run 3		Run 4		Total	
Sled	Athletes	Event	Time	Rank	Time	Rank	Time	Rank	Time	Rank	Time	Rank
CAN-1	Pierre Lueders; Dave MacEachern	Two-man	54.56	2	54.28	1	54.16	2	54.24	1	3:37.24	1st place, gold medalist(s)
CAN-2	Chris Lori; Jack Pyc	Two-man	54.74	5	54.72	10	54.71	12	54.79	14	3:38.98	12

Sled	Athletes	Event	Run 1		Run 2		Run 3		Total	
Sled	Athletes	Event	Time	Rank	Time	Rank	Time	Rank	Time	Rank
CAN-1	Pierre Lueders; Ricardo Greenidge; Jack Pyc; Dave MacEachern	Four-man	53.14	10	53.44	5	53.81	8	2:40.39	9
CAN-2	Chris Lori; Ben Hindle; Matt Hindle; Ian Danney	Four-man	53.52	11	53.69	13	53.93	13	2:41.14	11

== Cross-country skiing ==
Men

Event	Athlete	Race	
Event	Athlete	Time	Rank
10 km C	Yves Bilodeau	31:56.9	75
10 km C	Guido Visser	31:50.8	71
10 km C	Chris Blanchard	30:37.1	51
10 km C	Robin McKeever	30:32.2	48
15 km pursuit^{1} F	Guido Visser	48:43.5	58
15 km pursuit^{1} F	Chris Blanchard	47:44.3	56
30 km C	Guido Visser	1'55:04.1	64
30 km C	Robin McKeever	1'51:23.5	62
30 km C	Donald Farley	1'50:47.8	61
50 km F	Donald Farley	DNF	–
50 km F	Guido Visser	2'33:49.7	62
50 km F	Robin McKeever	2'28:19.0	58
50 km F	Chris Blanchard	2'26:58.9	56

^{1} Starting delay based on 10 km results.
C = Classical style, F = Freestyle

Men's 4 × 10 km relay

Athletes	Race	
Athletes	Time	Rank
Donald Farley; Robin McKeever; Chris Blanchard; Guido Visser	1'49:27.4	18

Women

Event	Athlete	Race	
Event	Athlete	Time	Rank
5 km C	Jaime Fortier	21:20.8	77
5 km C	Sara Renner	21:02.4	74
5 km C	Milaine Thériault	19:41.8	54
5 km C	Beckie Scott	19:32.6	47
10 km pursuit^{2} F	Sara Renner	36:36.7	64
10 km pursuit^{2} F	Milaine Thériault	34:29.8	56
10 km pursuit^{2} F	Beckie Scott	33:04.8	45
15 km C	Marie-Odile Raymond	56:53.3	62
15 km C	Beckie Scott	55:43.7	60
15 km C	Milaine Thériault	55:38.2	59
30 km F	Marie-Odile Raymond	1'41:07.2	56
30 km F	Sara Renner	1'40:14.6	54
30 km F	Beckie Scott	1'35:47.4	51

^{2} Starting delay based on 5 km results.
C = Classical style, F = Freestyle

Women's 4 × 5 km relay

Athletes	Race	
Athletes	Time	Rank
Beckie Scott; Milaine Thériault; Sara Renner; Jaime Fortier	1'01:09.9	16

== Curling ==
=== Men's tournament ===
==== Group stage ====
Top four teams advanced to semi-finals.

Country	Skip	W	L
Canada	Mike Harris	6	1
Norway	Eigil Ramsfjell	5	2
Switzerland	Patrick Hürlimann	5	2
United States	Tim Somerville	3	4
Japan	Makoto Tsuruga	3	4
Sweden	Peja Lindholm	3	4
Great Britain	Douglas Dryburgh	2	5
Germany	Andy Kapp	1	6

Team 1	Score	Team 2
Canada	7–4	Japan
Canada	11–3	United States
Canada	10–3	United Kingdom
Germany	6–10	Canada
Canada	8–3	Switzerland
Sweden	3–6	Canada
Norway	10–8	Canada

==== Medal round ====
Semi-final

Sheet D	1	2	3	4	5	6	7	8	9	10	Final
Canada (Harris) 🔨	2	1	1	0	1	2	0	0	X	X	7
United States (Somerville)	0	0	0	0	0	0	0	1	X	X	1

Gold medal match

Sheet C	1	2	3	4	5	6	7	8	9	10	Final
Canada (Harris) 🔨 (silver)	0	0	1	0	0	0	2	0	X	X	3
Switzerland (Hürlimann)	0	2	0	2	2	3	0	0	X	X	9

Contestants	Skip	Third	Second	Lead	Alternate
Silver medal	Mike Harris	Richard Hart	Collin Mitchell	George Karrys	Paul Savage

=== Women's tournament ===
==== Group stage ====
Top four teams advanced to semi-finals.

Country	Skip	W	L
Canada	Sandra Schmirler	6	1
Sweden	Elisabet Gustafson	6	1
Denmark	Helena Blach Lavrsen	5	2
Great Britain	Kirsty Hay	4	3
Japan	Mayumi Ohkutsu	2	5
Norway	Dordi Nordby	2	5
United States	Lisa Schoeneberg	2	5
Germany	Andrea Schöpp	1	6

Team 1	Score	Team 2
Canada	7–6	United States
Norway	6–5	Canada
Japan	4–7	Canada
Canada	9–5	Denmark
Canada	8–3	United Kingdom
Sweden	5–7	Canada
Canada	8–5	Germany

==== Medal round ====
Semi-final

Sheet B	1	2	3	4	5	6	7	8	9	10	Final
Canada (Schmirler)	0	1	0	1	0	1	0	2	0	1	6
Great Britain (Hay) 🔨	1	0	1	0	0	0	2	0	1	0	5

Gold medal match

Sheet C	1	2	3	4	5	6	7	8	9	10	Final
Denmark (Lavrsen)	0	2	0	0	0	0	2	0	1	X	5
Canada (Schmirler) 🔨 (gold)	3	0	0	1	1	1	0	1	0	X	7

Contestants	Skip	Third	Second	Lead	Alternate
Gold medal	Sandra Schmirler	Jan Betker	Joan McCusker	Marcia Gudereit	Atina Ford

== Figure skating ==
Men

Athlete	SP	FS	TFP	Rank
Jeff Langdon	17	10	18.5	12
Elvis Stojko	2	3	4.0	2nd place, silver medalist(s)

Pairs

Athletes	SP	FS	TFP	Rank
Marie-Claude Savard-Gagnon; Luc Bradet	12	16	22.0	16
Kristy Sargeant; Kris Wirtz	11	12	17.5	12

Ice dancing

Athletes	CD1	CD2	OD	FD	TFP	Rank
Chantal Lefebvre; Michel Brunet	19	19	19	19	38.0	19
Shae-Lynn Bourne; Victor Kraatz	5	4	4	3	7.2	4

== Freestyle skiing ==
Men

Athlete	Event	Qualification			Final		
Athlete	Event	Time	Points	Rank	Time	Points	Rank
Dominick Gauthier	Moguls	28.19	23.90	17	did not advance		
Stéphane Rochon	Moguls	28.11	24.62	8 Q	24.64	25.01	8
Jean-Luc Brassard	Moguls	27.40	24.73	7 Q	25.22	25.52	4
Ryan Johnson	Moguls	27.98	25.12	5 Q	27.35	25.25	7
Nicolas Fontaine	Aerials		219.60	8 Q		216.93	10
Jeff Bean	Aerials		224.86	7 Q		210.77	11
Andy Capicik	Aerials		227.39	5 Q		209.01	12

Women

Athlete	Event	Qualification			Final		
Athlete	Event	Time	Points	Rank	Time	Points	Rank
Josée Charbonneau	Moguls	36.02	18.54	24	did not advance		
Tami Bradley	Moguls	35.53	21.28	15 Q	34.96	15.02	16
Ann-Marie Pelchat	Moguls	33.47	23.35	1 Q	33.36	23.95	5
Caroline Olivier	Aerials		133.94	19	did not advance		
Veronica Brenner	Aerials		174.86	3 Q		151.15	9

== Ice hockey ==
=== Men's tournament ===
==== Group C ====
Team	GP	W	L	T	GF	GA	GD	Pts
Canada	3	3	0	0	12	3	+9	6
Sweden	3	2	1	0	11	7	+4	4
United States	3	1	2	0	8	10	-2	2
Belarus	3	0	3	0	4	15	-11	0

All times are local (UTC-7).

13 February 1998	Canada	5 – 0 (0-2, 0-2, 0-1)	Belarus	The Big Hat/ Aqua Wing Arena, Nagano, Japan; Attendance: 9,960

14 February 1998	Canada	3 – 2 (0-1, 3-0, 0-1)	Sweden	The Big Hat/ Aqua Wing Arena, Nagano, Japan; Attendance: 9,945

16 February 1998	Canada	4 – 1 (0-1, 0-2, 1-1)	United States	The Big Hat/ Aqua Wing Arena, Nagano, Japan; Attendance: 9,863

==== Quarter-final ====
All times are local (UTC-7).

18 February 1998	Canada	4 – 1 (2-1, 2-0, 0-0)	Kazakhstan	The Big Hat/ Aqua Wing Arena, Nagano, Japan; Attendance: 9,602

==== Semi-final ====
All times are local (UTC-7).

20 February 1998	Canada	1 – 2 (SO) (0-0, 0-0, 1-1, 0-0, 0-1)	Czech Republic	The Big Hat/ Aqua Wing Arena, Nagano, Japan; Attendance: 9,279

==== Bronze medal game ====
All times are local (UTC-7).

21 February 1998	Finland	3 – 2 (2-1, 0-1, 1-0)	Canada 4th	The Big Hat/ Aqua Wing Arena, Nagano, Japan; Attendance: 9,875

- Team roster
- Martin Brodeur
- Patrick Roy
- Curtis Joseph
- Ray Bourque
- Al MacInnis
- Rob Blake
- Adam Foote
- Éric Desjardins
- Chris Pronger
- Scott Stevens
- Eric Lindros
- Joe Nieuwendyk
- Theoren Fleury
- Wayne Gretzky
- Keith Primeau
- Joe Sakic
- Rod Brind'Amour
- Brendan Shanahan
- Shayne Corson
- Steve Yzerman
- Mark Recchi
- Rob Zamuner
- Trevor Linden
- Head coach: Marc Crawford

=== Women's tournament ===
==== Group stage ====
The first 4 teams (shaded green) advanced to medal round games.

Team	GP	W	L	T	GF	GA	Pts
United States	5	5	0	0	33	7	10
Canada	5	4	1	0	28	12	8
Finland	5	3	2	0	27	10	6
China	5	2	3	0	10	15	4
Sweden	5	1	4	0	10	21	2
Japan	5	0	5	0	2	45	0

Team 1	Score	Team 2
Canada	13–0	Japan
Canada	2–0	China
Sweden	3–5	Canada
Finland	2–4	Canada
Canada	4–7	United States

==== Gold medal game ====
17 February
United States	3 – 1	Canada (silver)	Big Hat (8,626)
First period	Ref: (Canada) Marina Zenk
no scoring
Second period
G. Ulion (S. Whyte, S. Merz) (pp) 2:38
Third period
S. Looney (S. Whyte, G. Ulion) (pp) 10:57
D. Goyette (H. Wickenheiser, G. Heaney) (pp) 15:59
S. Whyte (en) 19:52
Game stats

Silver:
Canada

Jennifer Botterill
Thérèse Brisson
Cassie Campbell
Judy Diduck
Nancy Drolet
Lori Dupuis
Danielle Goyette
Geraldine Heaney
Jayna Hefford
Becky Kellar
Kathy McCormack
Karen Nystrom
Lesley Reddon
Manon Rhéaume
France St-Louis
Laura Schuler
Fiona Smith
Vicky Sunohara
Hayley Wickenheiser
Stacy Wilson-C

== Luge ==
Men

Athlete	Run 1		Run 2		Run 3		Run 4		Total	
Athlete	Time	Rank	Time	Rank	Time	Rank	Time	Rank	Time	Rank
Tyler Seitz	50.689	19	50.948	23	50.400	14	50.405	14	3:22.442	18
Clay Ives	50.632	17	50.348	16	50.858	21	50.437	16	3:22.275	15

== Short track speed skating ==
Men

Athlete	Event	Round one		Quarter finals		Semi finals		Finals	
Athlete	Event	Time	Rank	Time	Rank	Time	Rank	Time	Final rank
François Drolet	500 m	43.551	1 Q	DSQ	–	did not advance			
Marc Gagnon	500 m	43.901	2 Q	43.254	1 Q	42.780	2 Q	1:15.60	4
Éric Bédard	500 m	43.342	1 Q	43.113	3	did not advance			
Éric Bédard	1000 m	1:32.975	2 Q	1:29.622	2 Q	1:36.233	2 QA	1:32.661	3rd place, bronze medalist(s)
François Drolet	1000 m	1:32.949	1 Q	1:32.513	3	did not advance			
Marc Gagnon	1000 m	1:30.476	2 Q	DSQ	–	did not advance			
Éric Bédard; Derrick Campbell; François Drolet; Marc Gagnon	5000 m relay					7:05.766	1 QA	7:06.075	1st place, gold medalist(s)

Women

Athlete	Event	Round one		Quarter finals		Semi finals		Finals	
Athlete	Event	Time	Rank	Time	Rank	Time	Rank	Time	Final rank
Tania Vicent	500 m	1:10.212	4	did not advance					
Annie Perreault	500 m	45.866	2 Q	46.421	1 Q	45.612	1 QA	46.568	1st place, gold medalist(s)
Isabelle Charest	500 m	46.085	1 Q	46.194	2 Q	44.991 OR	1 QA	DSQ	–
Isabelle Charest	1000 m	1:39.729	1 Q	1:37.200	1 Q	1:35.741	3 QB	1:37.813	7
Annie Perreault	1000 m	1:39.128	2 Q	1:35.302	5	did not advance			
Tania Vicent	1000 m	1:40.923	3	did not advance					
Christine Boudrias; Isabelle Charest; Annie Perreault; Tania Vicent	3000 m relay					4:24.152	2 QA	4:21.205	3rd place, bronze medalist(s)

== Snowboarding ==
Men's giant slalom

Athlete	Race 1	Race 2	Total	
Athlete	Time	Time	Time	Rank
Mark Fawcett	DNF	–	DNF	–
Darren Chalmers	1:04.09	DSQ	DSQ	–
Ross Rebagliati	59.87	1:04.09	2:03.96	1st place, gold medalist(s)
Jasey-Jay Anderson	59.31	1:12.02	2:11.33	16

Men's halfpipe

Athlete	Qualifying round 1		Qualifying round 2		Final	
Athlete	Points	Rank	Points	Rank	Points	Rank
Trevor Andrew	24.1	36	32.4	21	did not advance	
Mike Michalchuk	32.3	27	41.4	2 QF	76.0	8
Derek Heidt	35.6	16	35.8	17	did not advance	
Brett Carpentier	36.3	13	41.8	1 QF	75.6	9

Women's halfpipe

Athlete	Qualifying round 1		Qualifying round 2		Final	
Athlete	Points	Rank	Points	Rank	Points	Rank
Lori Glazier	25.9	19	29.1	13	did not advance	
Tara Teigen	32.9	8	33.3	6	did not advance	
Natasza Zurek	33.9	6	11.6	21	did not advance	
Maëlle Ricker	34.4	4 QF			71.1	5

== Speed skating ==
Men

Event	Athlete	Race 1		Race 2		Total	
Event	Athlete	Time	Rank	Time	Rank	Time	Rank
500 m	Jeremy Wotherspoon	36.04	7	35.80	2	71.84	2nd place, silver medalist(s)
500 m	Pat Bouchard	35.96	5	36.09	4	72.05	5
500 m	Sylvain Bouchard	35.90	4	36.10	5	72.00	4
500 m	Kevin Overland	35.78	2	36.08	3	71.86	3rd place, bronze medalist(s)
1000 m	Pat Bouchard					1:12.49	19
1000 m	Kevin Overland					1:11.90	9
1000 m	Jeremy Wotherspoon					1:11.39	6
1000 m	Sylvain Bouchard					1:11.29	5
1500 m	Neal Marshall					1:52.93	30
1500 m	Kevin Marshall					1:52.77	26
1500 m	Steven Elm					1:52.70	25
1500 m	Kevin Overland					1:52.07	20
5000 m	Mark Knoll					6:50.55	24
5000 m	Steven Elm					6:48.67	23

Women

Event	Athlete	Race 1		Race 2		Total	
Event	Athlete	Time	Rank	Time	Rank	Time	Rank
500 m	Michelle Morton	42.95	36	39.84	17	82.79	33
500 m	Linda Johnson-Blair	39.24	11	39.57	14	78.81	13
500 m	Susan Auch	38.42	2	38.51	2	76.93	2nd place, silver medalist(s)
500 m	Catriona Le May Doan	38.39	1	38.21 OR	1	76.60	1st place, gold medalist(s)
1000 m	Sylvie Cantin					1:22.46	33
1000 m	Linda Johnson-Blair					1:20.42	21
1000 m	Susan Auch					1:19.82	18
1000 m	Catriona Le May Doan					1:17.37	3rd place, bronze medalist(s)
1500 m	Isabelle Doucet					2:06.45	29
1500 m	Ingrid Liepa					2:04.60	24
1500 m	Catriona Le May Doan					2:02.19	13
3000 m	Ingrid Liepa					4:27.99	25
3000 m	Susan Massitti					4:21.66	21
3000 m	Cindy Overland					4:20.81	19

== Official outfitter ==
- Roots Canada became the official outfitter of clothing for members of the Canadian Olympic team. The same clothing was also sold at Roots stores in Canada.
