= Speed skating at the 1998 Winter Olympics – Women's 1000 metres =

Women's 1000 metres at the XVIII Olympic Winter Games
- Pictogram for speed skating
- Venue: M-Wave
- Dates: February 19, 1998
- Competitors: 40 from 14 nations
- Winning time: 1:16.51

Medalists
1st place, gold medalist(s)		Marianne Timmer; Netherlands
2nd place, silver medalist(s)		Chris Witty; United States
3rd place, bronze medalist(s)		Catriona LeMay Doan; Canada

The women's 1000 metres in speed skating at the 1998 Winter Olympics took place on 19 February, at the M-Wave.

== Records ==
Prior to this competition, the existing world and Olympic records were as follows:

World record	Chris Witty (USA)	1:15.43	Calgary, Canada	23 November 1997
Olympic record	Christa Rothenburger (GDR)	1:17.65	Calgary, Canada	26 February 1988

The following new Olympic records was set during this competition.

Date	Pair	Athlete	Country	Time	OR	WR
19 February	Pair 17	Catriona LeMay Doan	Canada	1:17.37	OR	
19 February	Pair 19	Marianne Timmer	Netherlands	1:16.51	OR	

== Results ==
Rank	Pair	Athlete	Country	Time	Behind	Notes
1st place, gold medalist(s)	19	Marianne Timmer	Netherlands	1:16.51	-	OR
2nd place, silver medalist(s)	20	Chris Witty	United States	1:16.79	+0.28	
3rd place, bronze medalist(s)	17	Catriona LeMay Doan	Canada	1:17.37	+0.86	
4	18	Sabine Völker	Germany	1:17.54	+1.03	
5	16	Annamarie Thomas	Netherlands	1:17.95	+1.44	
6	15	Becky Sundstrom	United States	1:18.23	+1.72	
7	14	Tomomi Okazaki	Japan	1:18.27	+1.76	
8	18	Eriko Sanmiya	Japan	1:18.36	+1.85	
9	13	Moira D'Andrea	United States	1:18.38	+1.87	
10	17	Monique Garbrecht	Germany	1:18.76	+2.25	
11	16	Shiho Kusunose	Japan	1:18.82	+2.31	
12	2	Svetlana Zhurova	Russia	1:19.04	+2.53	
13	9	Jennifer Rodriguez	United States	1:19.19	+2.68	
14	2	Edel Therese Høiseth	Norway	1:19.23	+2.72	
15		Sandra Zwolle	Netherlands	1:19.29	+2.78	
16	13	Anke Baier-Loef	Germany	1:19.42	+2.91	
17	14	Nataliya Polozkova	Russia	1:19.78	+3.27	
18	20	Susan Auch	Canada	1:19.82	+3.31	
19	2	Tatyana Danshina	Russia	1:19.95	+3.44	
20	9	Marieke Wijsman	Netherlands	1:20.02	+3.51	
21	10	Linda Johnson-Blair	Canada	1:20.42	+3.91	
22	15	Kyoko Shimazaki	Japan	1:20.49	+3.98	
23	3	Krisztina Egyed	Hungary	1:21.23	+4.72	
24	5	Choi Seung-yong	South Korea	1:21.28	+4.77	
25	6	Anzhelika Kotyuga	Belarus	1:21.35	+4.84	
26	4	Li Xuesong	China	1:21.54	+5.03	
27	1	Anna Savelyeva	Russia	1:21.83	+5.32	
28	3	Lesia Bilozub	Ukraine	1:21.84	+5.33	
28	11	Xue Ruihong	China	1:21.84	+5.33	
30	6	Cheon Hui-ju	South Korea	1:22.06	+5.55	
31	2	Wang Manli	China	1:22.13	+5.62	
32	8	Yang Chunyuan	China	1:22.20	+5.69	
33	11	Sylvie Cantin	Canada	1:22.46	+5.95	
34	8	Lyudmila Kostyukevich	Belarus	1:22.58	+6.07	
35	4	Kim Ju-hyeon	South Korea	1:23.18	+6.67	
36	1	Kim Ok-hui	North Korea	1:23.37	+6.86	
37	5	Kim Jong-hui	North Korea	1:23.88	+7.37	
38	7	Gang Mi-yeong	South Korea	1:24.18	+7.67	
39	7	Ilonda Lūse	Latvia	1:24.32	+7.81	
-	19	Franziska Schenk	Germany	DNF		
