= Speed skating at the 1998 Winter Olympics – Women's 500 metres =

Women's 500 metres at the XVIII Olympic Winter Games
- Pictogram for speed skating
- Venue: M-Wave
- Dates: February 13–14, 1998
- Competitors: 38 from 14 nations
- Winning time: 1:16.60

Medalists
1st place, gold medalist(s)		Catriona Le May Doan; Canada
2nd place, silver medalist(s)		Susan Auch; Canada
3rd place, bronze medalist(s)		Tomomi Okazaki; Japan

The women's 500 metres in speed skating at the 1998 Winter Olympics took place on 13 and 14 February, at the M-Wave.

== Records ==
Prior to this competition, the existing world and Olympic records were as follows:

World record	Catriona Le May Doan (CAN)	37.55	Calgary, Canada	28 December 1997
Olympic record	Bonnie Blair (USA)	39.10	Calgary, Canada	22 February 1988

The following new Olympic records were set during this competition.

Date	Athlete	Time	OR	WR
13 February	Catriona Le May Doan (CAN)	38.39	OR	
14 February	Catriona Le May Doan (CAN)	38.21	OR	

== Results ==
Rank	Name	Country	Race 1	Race 2	Total	Notes
1st place, gold medalist(s)	Catriona Le May Doan	Canada	38.39	38.21	1:16.60	OR
2nd place, silver medalist(s)	Susan Auch	Canada	38.42	38.51	1:16.93	
3rd place, bronze medalist(s)	Tomomi Okazaki	Japan	38.55	38.55	1:17.10	
4	Franziska Schenk	Germany	38.88	38.57	1:17.45	
5	Kyoko Shimazaki	Japan	38.75	38.93	1:17.68	
6	Marianne Timmer	Netherlands	39.12	39.03	1:18.15	
7	Sabine Völker	Germany	39.19	39.00	1:18.19	
8	Monique Garbrecht	Germany	39.11	39.34	1:18.45	
9	Svetlana Zhurova	Russia	39.11	39.38	1:18.49	
10	Chris Witty	United States	39.09	39.44	1:18.53	
11	Eriko Sanmiya	Japan	39.25	39.31	1:18.56	
12	Shiho Kusunose	Japan	39.56	39.24	1:18.80	
13	Linda Johnson-Blair	Canada	39.24	39.57	1:18.81	
14	Xue Ruihong	China	39.49	39.53	1:19.02	
15	Anke Baier-Loef	Germany	39.73	39.75	1:19.48	
16	Anzhelika Kotyuga	Belarus	39.76	39.85	1:19.61	
17	Sandra Zwolle	Netherlands	39.98	39.88	1:19.86	
17	Becky Sundstrom	United States	40.20	39.66	1:19.86	
19	Moira D'Andrea	United States	39.83	40.09	1:19.92	
20	Edel Therese Høiseth	Norway	40.02	39.99	1:20.01	
21	Oksana Ravilova	Russia	39.99	40.04	1:20.03	
22	Wang Manli	China	40.01	40.06	1:20.07	
23	Yang Chunyuan	China	39.92	40.24	1:20.16	
24	Choi Seung-yong	South Korea	40.17	40.62	1:20.79	
25	Marieke Wijsman	Netherlands	40.22	40.57	1:20.79	
26	Amy Sannes	United States	40.41	40.49	1:20.90	
27	Lesia Bilozub	Ukraine	40.42	40.52	1:20.94	
28	Tatyana Danshina	Russia	40.53	40.59	1:21.12	
29	Cheon Hui-ju	South Korea	40.67	40.95	1:21.62	
30	Gang Mi-yeong	South Korea	40.96	41.29	1:22.25	
31	Lyudmila Kostyukevich	Belarus	41.00	41.43	1:22.43	
32	Krisztina Egyed	Hungary	41.20	41.41	1:22.61	
33	Kim Ju-hyeon	South Korea	41.36	41.43	1:22.79	
34	Michelle Morton	Canada	42.95	39.84	1:22.79	
35	Kim Jong-hui	North Korea	42.17	41.57	1:23.74	
36	Jin Hua	China	64.07	40.32	1:44.39	
37	Andrea Nuyt	Netherlands	39.62	78.32	1:57.94	
-	Emese Hunyady	Austria	DQ	-	-	
