= Speed skating at the 1998 Winter Olympics – Men's 1000 metres =

Speed skating at the Olympics

Men's 1000 metres at the XVIII Olympic Winter Games
- Pictogram for speed skating
- Venue: M-Wave
- Dates: 15 February 1998
- Competitors: 43 from 17 nations
- Winning time: 1:10.64

Medalists
1st place, gold medalist(s)		Ids Postma; Netherlands
2nd place, silver medalist(s)		Jan Bos; Netherlands
3rd place, bronze medalist(s)		Hiroyasu Shimizu; Japan

The men's 1000 metres in speed skating at the 1998 Winter Olympics took place on 15 February, at the M-Wave arena.

== Records ==
Prior to this competition, the existing world and Olympic records were as follows:

World record	Jeremy Wotherspoon (CAN)	1:10.16	Calgary, Canada	29 December 1997
Olympic record	Dan Jansen (USA)	1:12.43	Hamar, Norway	18 February 1994

The following new Olympic and world records was set during this competition.

Date	Pair	Athlete	Country	Time	OR	WR
15 February	Pair 2	Peter Adeberg	Germany	1:11.90	OR	
15 February	Pair 16	Hiroyasu Shimizu	Japan	1:11.00	OR	
15 February	Pair 17	Ids Postma	Netherlands	1:10.64	OR	

== Results ==
Rank	Pair	Name	Country	Time	Time behind	Notes
1st place, gold medalist(s)	17	Ids Postma	Netherlands	1:10.64	-	OR
2nd place, silver medalist(s)	21	Jan Bos	Netherlands	1:10.71	+0.07	
3rd place, bronze medalist(s)	16	Hiroyasu Shimizu	Japan	1:11.00	+0.36	
4	18	Jakko Jan Leeuwangh	Netherlands	1:11.26	+0.62	
5	20	Sylvain Bouchard	Canada	1:11.29	+0.65	
6	19	Jeremy Wotherspoon	Canada	1:11.39	+0.75	
7	16	Casey FitzRandolph	United States	1:11.64	+1.00	
8	17	K. C. Boutiette	United States	1:11.75	+1.11	
9	2	Peter Adeberg	Germany	1:11.90	+1.26	
9	22	Kevin Overland	Canada	1:11.90	+1.26	
11	15	Yusuke Imai	Japan	1:11.96	+1.32	
12	19	Martin Hersman	Netherlands	1:12.00	+1.36	
13	22	Lee Kyou-hyuk	South Korea	1:12.05	+1.41	
14	3	Grunde Njøs	Norway	1:12.27	+1.63	
14	5	Davide Carta	Italy	1:12.27	+1.63	
16	11	Christian Breuer	Germany	1:12.33	+1,69	
17	9	Sergey Tsybenko	Kazakhstan	1:12.40	+1.76	
17	20	Manabu Horii	Japan	1:12.40	+1.76	
19	21	Pat Bouchard	Canada	1:12.49	+1.85	
20	12	Kim Yoon-man	South Korea	1:12.50	+1.86	
21	11	Janne Hänninen	Finland	1:12.55	+1.91	
21	14	Cheon Ju-hyeon	South Korea	1:12.55	+1.91	
23	8	Andrey Anufriyenko	Russia	1:12.61	+1.97	
23	10	Nathaniel Mills	United States	1:12.61	+1.97	
25	10	Hiroyuki Noake	Japan	1:12.68	+2.04	
26	13	Paweł Abratkiewicz	Poland	1:12.80	+2.16	
27	14	Ermanno Ioriatti	Italy	1:12.83	+2.19	
28	12	Aleksandr Kibalko	Russia	1:12.94	+2.30	
29	18	Cory Carpenter	United States	1:13.03	+2.39	
30	5	Jaegal Sung-yeol	South Korea	1:13.09	+2.45	
31	13	Roland Brunner	Austria	1:13.16	+2.52	
32	8	Dmitry Shepel	Russia	1:13.31	+2.67	
33	4	Sergey Klevchenya	Russia	1:13.51	+2.87	
34	6	Roger Strøm	Norway	1:13.58	+2.94	
35	1	Andrew Nicholson	New Zealand	1:13.86	+3.22	
36	7	Dai Dengwen	China	1:14.20	+3.56	
37	6	Vladimir Klepinin	Kazakhstan	1:14.38	+3.74	
38	4	Li Yu	China	1:14.50	+3.86	
39	7	Oleh Kostromitin	Ukraine	1:14.53	+3.89	
40	1	Liu Hongbo	China	1:15.06	+4.42	
41	15	Tomasz Świst	Poland	1:15.55	+4.91	
42	2	Zsolt Baló	Hungary	1:15.87	+5.23	
-	3	Wu Fenglong	China	DNF		
