= Speed skating at the 1999 Asian Winter Games – Women's 500 metres =

Women's 500 metres at the 1999 Asian Winter Games
- Venue: Chuncheon Outdoor Ice Rink
- Dates: 2–3 February 1999
- Competitors: 11 from 3 nations

Medalists
gold medal	Xue Ruihong	China
silver medal	Yang Chunyuan	China
bronze medal	Wang Manli	China

The women's 500 metres at the 1999 Asian Winter Games was held on 2 and 3 February 1999 in Chuncheon, South Korea.

== Schedule ==
All times are Korea Standard Time (UTC+09:00)

Date	Time	Event
Tuesday, 2 February 1999	12:55	1st race
Wednesday, 3 February 1999	10:00	2nd race

== Records ==
=== 500 meters ===
Prior to this competition, the existing world and Games records were as follows.

World Record	Catriona Le May Doan (CAN)	37.55	Calgary, Canada	29 December 1997
Games Record	Wang Manli (CHN)	40.51	Harbin, China	5 February 1996

=== 500 meters × 2 ===
Prior to this competition, the existing world and Games records were as follows.

World Record	Catriona Le May Doan (CAN)	1:15.26	Calgary, Canada	29 December 1997
Games Record	Wang Manli (CHN); Xue Ruihong (CHN)	1:21.43	Harbin, China	6 February 1996

== Results ==
Rank	Athlete	1st race		2nd race		Total	Notes
Rank	Athlete	Pair	Time	Pair	Time	Total	Notes
1st place, gold medalist(s)	Xue Ruihong (CHN)	6	39.29 GR	6	40.84	1:20.13	GR
2nd place, silver medalist(s)	Yang Chunyuan (CHN)	5	40.61	5	40.92	1:21.53	
3rd place, bronze medalist(s)	Wang Manli (CHN)	4	41.60	4	40.93	1:22.53	
4	Yumiko Soda (JPN)	6	40.84	6	41.71	1:22.55	
5	Li Xuesong (CHN)	3	41.62	4	41.38	1:23.00	
6	Sayuri Osuga (JPN)	5	41.51	5	41.87	1:23.38	
7	Choi Seung-yong (KOR)	4	42.18	3	41.29	1:23.47	
8	Yukari Watanabe (JPN)	3	42.22	3	41.70	1:23.92	
9	Cho Seon-yeon (KOR)	1	42.26	2	42.35	1:24.61	
10	Shin Yoo-na (KOR)	2	43.14	2	43.14	1:26.28	
11	Hanae Okuyama (JPN)	2	44.31	1	43.67	1:27.98	
