= China at the 1998 Winter Olympics =

- IOC code: CHN
- NOC: Chinese Olympic Committee
- Website: www.olympic.cn (in Chinese and English)

in Nagano
- Competitors: 60 (16 men, 44 women) in 7 sports
- Flag bearer: Zhao Hongbo (figure skating)
- Medals Ranked 16th: Gold 0 Silver 6 Bronze 2 Total 8

Winter Olympics appearances (overview)
- 1980; 1984; 1988; 1992; 1994; 1998; 2002; 2006; 2010; 2014; 2018; 2022; 2026

China was represented at the 1998 Winter Olympics in Nagano, Japan by the Chinese Olympic Committee.

In total, 60 athletes including 16 men and 44 women represented China in seven different sports including biathlon, cross-country skiing, figure skating, freestyle skiing, ice hockey, short track speed skating and speed skating.

China won a total of eight medals at the games including six silver and two bronze. Six of the medals came in short track speed skating, one in Figure skating and one in Freestyle skiing. Speed skater Yang Yang (S) was the most successful Chinese athlete at the games, winning three silver medals.

== Competitors ==
In total, 57 athletes represented China at the 1998 Winter Olympics in Nagano, Japan across seven different sports.

Sport	Men	Women	Total
Biathlon	0	4	4
Cross-country skiing	2	2	4
Figure skating	2	2	4
Freestyle skiing	1	4	5
Ice hockey	0	20	20
Short track speed skating	4	4	8
Speed skating	6	6	12
Total	15	42	57

== Medalists ==
China won a total of eight medals at the games including six silver and two bronze.

Medal	Name	Sport	Event	Date
Silver	Li Jiajun	Short track speed skating	Men's 1,000 m	17 February
Silver	Yang Yang (A); Yang Yang (S); Wang Chunlu; Sun Dandan	Short track speed skating	Women's 3,000 m relay	17 February
Silver	Xu Nannan	Freestyle skiing	Women's aerials	18 February
Silver	Yang Yang (S)	Short track speed skating	Women's 500 m	19 February
Silver	An Yulong	Short track speed skating	Men's 500 m	21 February
Silver	Yang Yang (S)	Short track speed skating	Women's 1,000 m	21 February
Bronze	Chen Lu	Figure skating	Women's singles	20 February
Bronze	Li Jiajun; Feng Kai; Yuan Ye; An Yulong	Short track speed skating	Men's 5,000 m relay	21 February

== Biathlon ==
In total, four Chinese athletes participated in the biathlon events – Yu Shumei, Sun Ribo, Liu Jinfeng and Liu Xianying.

Event	Athlete	Misses ^{1}	Time	Rank
7.5 km Sprint	Sun Ribo	3	25:29.0	39
7.5 km Sprint	Yu Shumei	0	23:44.0	5

Event	Athlete	Time	Misses	Adjusted time ^{2}	Rank
15 km	Sun Ribo	52:19.2	6	58:19.2	21
15 km	Yu Shumei	54:41.3	2	56:41.3	9

Event	Athletes	Race		
Event	Athletes	Misses ^{1}	Time	Rank
4 x 7.5 km relay	Yu Shumei; Sun Ribo; Liu Jinfeng; Liu Xianying	1	1'43:32.6	7

^{1} A penalty loop of 150 metres had to be skied per missed target.
^{2} One minute added per missed target.

== Cross-country skiing ==
In total, four Chinese athletes participated in the cross-country skiing events – Qu Donghai, Wu Jintao, Guo Dongling and Luan Zhengrong.

Event	Athlete	Race	
Event	Athlete	Time	Rank
Men's 10 km C	Qu Donghai	DNF	–
Men's 10 km C	Wu Jintao	32:57.7	81
Men's 15 km pursuit^{1} F	Wu Jintao	52:28.1	68
Men's 30 km C	Wu Jintao	DNF	–
Men's 50 km F	Qu Donghai	2'16:42.3	29
Women's 5 km C	Guo Dongling	20:58.0	72
Women's 5 km C	Luan Zhengrong	20:30.0	68
Women's 10 km pursuit^{2} F	Guo Dongling	36:58.2	65
Women's 10 km pursuit^{2} F	Luan Zhengrong	35:47.3	62
Women's 15 km C	Guo Dongling	54:50.6	55
Women's 15 km C	Luan Zhengrong	53:48.4	51

^{1} Starting delay based on 10 km results.
^{2} Starting delay based on 5 km results.
C = Classical style, F = Freestyle

== Figure skating ==
In total, four Chinese athletes participated in the figure skating events – Zhengxin Guo in the men's singles, Chen Lu in the women's singles and Shen Xue and Zhao Hongbo in the pairs.

Athlete	Event	SP	FS	TFP	Rank
Zhengxin Guo	Men's singles	10	9	14.0	8
Chen Lu	Women's singles	4	3	5.0	3rd place, bronze medalist(s)
Shen Xue; Zhao Hongbo	Pairs	8	5	9.0	5

== Freestyle skiing ==
In total, five Chinese athletes participated in the freestyle skiing events – Ou Xiaotao in the men's aerials and Yin Hong, Guo Dandan, Ji Xiaoou and Xu Nannan in the women's aerials.

Athlete	Event	Qualification			Final		
Athlete	Event	Time	Points	Rank	Time	Points	Rank
Ou Xiaotao	Men's aerials		183.84	17	did not advance		
Yin Hong	Women's aerials		90.73	24	did not advance		
Guo Dandan	Women's aerials		163.95	8 Q		159.74	7
Ji Xiaoou	Women's aerials		167.42	6 Q		?	12
Xu Nannan	Women's aerials		182.01	1 Q		186.97	2nd place, silver medalist(s)

== Ice hockey ==
In total, 20 Chinese athletes participated in the ice hockey events – Chen Jing, Dang Hong, Diao Ying, Gong Ming, Guo Hong, Guo Lili, Guo Wei, Huo Lina, Li Xuan, Liu Chunhua, Liu Hongmei, Lu Yan, Ma Jinping, Ma Xiaojun, Sang Hong, Wang Wei, Xu Lei, Yang Xiuqing, Zhang Jing and Zhang Lan in the women's competition.

Pos	Team	Pld	W	D	L	GF	GA	GD	Pts	Qualification
1	United States	5	5	0	0	33	7	+26	10	Gold medal game
2	Canada	5	4	0	1	28	12	+16	8	Gold medal game
3	Finland	5	3	0	2	27	10	+17	6	Bronze medal game
4	China	5	2	0	3	10	15	−5	4	Bronze medal game
5	Sweden	5	1	0	4	10	21	−11	2	
6	Japan (H)	5	0	0	5	2	45	−43	0	

(H) Hosts

Team 1	Score	Team 2
China	0–5	United States
Canada	2–0	China
Japan	1–6	China
China	3–1	Sweden
Finland	6–1	China

Bronze medal match

Team 1	Score	Team 2
Finland	4–1	China

== Short track speed skating ==
In total, eight Chinese athletes participated in the short track speed skating events – An Yulong, Feng Kai, Li Jiajun, Yuan Ye, Wang Chunlu, Yang Yang (A), Yang Yang (S) and Sun Dandan.

Athlete	Event	Round one		Quarter finals		Semi finals		Finals	
Athlete	Event	Time	Rank	Time	Rank	Time	Rank	Time	Final rank
An Yulong	Men's 500 m	43.748	1 Q	43.384	1 Q	43.796	2 QA	43.022	2nd place, silver medalist(s)
Feng Kai	Men's 500 m	44.817	2 Q	44.384	3	did not advance			
Li Jiajun	Men's 500 m	43.831	1 Q	42.861	1 Q	DSQ	–	did not advance	
Feng Kai	Men's 1,000 m	1:31.724	3	did not advance					
An Yulong	Men's 1,000 m	1:32.731	2 Q	1:29.784	3	did not advance			
Li Jiajun	Men's 1,000 m	1:34.023	2 Q	1:34.510	1 Q	1:32.183	2 QA	1:32.428	2nd place, silver medalist(s)
Li Jiajun; Feng Kai; Yuan Ye; An Yulong	Men's 5,000 m relay					7:05.797	2 QA	7:11.559	3rd place, bronze medalist(s)
Wang Chunlu	Women's 500 m	45.655	1 Q	46.091	1 Q	46.655	2 QA	DNF	–
Yang Yang (A)	Women's 500 m	46.815	1 Q	DSQ	–	did not advance			
Yang Yang (S)	Women's 500 m	46.136	1 Q	46.578	2 Q	45.101	2 QA	46.627	2nd place, silver medalist(s)
Yang Yang (S)	Women's 1,000 m	1:35.244	1 Q	1:37.252	2 Q	1:35.721	2 QA	1:43.343	2nd place, silver medalist(s)
Wang Chunlu	Women's 1,000 m	DSQ	–	did not advance					
Yang Yang (A)	Women's 1,000 m	1:37.062	1 Q	1:31.991 WR	1 Q	1:34.688	1 QA	DSQ	–
Yang Yang (A); Yang Yang (S); Wang Chunlu; Sun Dandan	Women's 3,000 m relay					4:22.342	2 QA	4:16.383	2nd place, silver medalist(s)

== Speed skating ==
In total, 12 Chinese athletes participated in the speed skating events – Dai Dengwen, Li Yu, Liu Hongbo, Wu Fenglong, Feng Qingbo, Wan Chunbo, Jin Hua, Wang Manli, Yang Chunyuan, Xue Ruihong, Li Xuesong and Song Li.

Event	Athlete	Race 1		Race 2		Total	
Event	Athlete	Time	Rank	Time	Rank	Time	Rank
Men's 500 m	Dai Dengwen	37.03	33	36.95	32	73.98	31
Men's 500 m	Li Yu	36.79	27	36.79	26	73.58	27
Men's 500 m	Liu Hongbo	36.77	25	36.95	32	73.72	28
Men's 1,000 m	Wu Fenglong					DNF	–
Men's 1,000 m	Liu Hongbo					1:15.06	40
Men's 1,000 m	Li Yu					1:14.50	38
Men's 1,000 m	Dai Dengwen					1:14.20	36
Men's 1,500 m	Feng Qingbo					1:56.45	43
Men's 1,500 m	Wan Chunbo					1:54.64	36
Women's 500 m	Jin Hua	1:04.07	37	40.32	25	104.39	36
Women's 500 m	Wang Manli	40.01	22	40.06	22	80.07	22
Women's 500 m	Yang Chunyuan	39.92	19	40.24	24	80.16	23
Women's 500 m	Xue Ruihong	39.49	13	39.53	13	79.02	14
1,000 m	Yang Chunyuan					1:22.20	32
1,000 m	Wang Manli					1:22.13	31
1,000 m	Xue Ruihong					1:21.84	28
1,000 m	Li Xuesong					1:21.54	26
Women's 1,500 m	Li Xuesong					2:08.05	31
Women's 1,500 m	Song Li					2:05.98	28
Women's 3,000 m	Song Li					4:28.99	26
