= 108th Regiment =

108th Regiment may refer to:

- 108th Regiment of Foot (disambiguation), British Army regiments
- 108th Regiment Royal Armoured Corps
- 108th Anti-Aircraft Missile Regiment, Ukraine
- 108th Light Anti-Aircraft Regiment, Royal Artillery
- 108th Artillery Regiment "Cosseria", Italian Army
- 108th Aviation Regiment, United States Army
- 108th Cavalry Regiment, United States Army
- 108th Field Artillery Regiment, United States Army
- 108th Infantry Regiment (United States)
- 108th Guards Kuban Cossack Air Assault Regiment, Russia

== American Civil War regiments ==
- 108th Illinois Infantry Regiment
- 108th New York Infantry Regiment
- 108th Ohio Infantry Regiment
- 108th United States Colored Infantry Regiment

== See also ==
- 108th Brigade (disambiguation)
- 108th Division (disambiguation)
