= Speed skating at the 1999 Asian Winter Games – Women's 1000 metres =

Women's 1000 metres at the 1999 Asian Winter Games
- Venue: Chuncheon Outdoor Ice Rink
- Dates: 5 February 1999
- Competitors: 13 from 4 nations

Medalists
gold medal	Xue Ruihong	China
silver medal	Yang Chunyuan	China
bronze medal	Li Xuesong	China

The women's 1000 metres at the 1999 Asian Winter Games was held on 5 February 1999 in Chuncheon, South Korea.

== Schedule ==
All times are Korea Standard Time (UTC+09:00)

Date	Time	Event
Friday, 5 February 1999	10:00	Final

== Records ==
Prior to this competition, the existing world and Games records were as follows.

World Record	Chris Witty (USA)	1:14.96	Calgary, Canada	28 March 1998
Games Record	Chun Hee-joo (KOR)	1:23.30	Harbin, China	8 February 1996

== Results ==
Legend

- DNS — Did not start

Rank	Pair	Athlete	Time	Notes
1st place, gold medalist(s)	4	Xue Ruihong (CHN)	1:23.61	
2nd place, silver medalist(s)	2	Yang Chunyuan (CHN)	1:23.64	
3rd place, bronze medalist(s)	6	Li Xuesong (CHN)	1:24.23	
4	5	Yumiko Soda (JPN)	1:24.33	
5	4	Aki Narita (JPN)	1:25.27	
6	5	Choi Seung-yong (KOR)	1:25.36	
7	7	Baek Eun-bi (KOR)	1:25.68	
8	7	Sayuri Osuga (JPN)	1:26.12	
9	6	Cho Seon-yeon (KOR)	1:26.16	
10	1	Wang Manli (CHN)	1:26.39	
11	3	Shin Yoo-na (KOR)	1:26.47	
12	2	Yukari Watanabe (JPN)	1:26.68	
—	3	Kenzhesh Sarsekenova (KAZ)	DNS	
