= Hindle =

Hindle is a surname. Notable people with the surname include:

- Abel James Hindle (1870–1954), Canadian farmer and politician
- Art Hindle (born 1948), Canadian actor and film director
- Ben Hindle (born 1974), Canadian bobsledder
- Emma Hindle (born 1975), British equestrian
- Frank Hindle (1925–2013), English footballer
- Frederick Hindle (disambiguation), multiple people
- James William Hindle, British singer-songwriter from Yorkshire
- John Hindle (1857–1927), Australian politician
- John Hindle (businessman) (1934-2012), British property developer and Olympic Games hockey player
- Kathleen Hindle (1948-2025), Scottish chess master
- Madge Hindle (born 1938), English actress
- Matt Hindle (born 2007), English media star
- Matt Hindle (born 1974), Canadian bobsledder
- Owen Hindle (born 1940), English chess master
- Tom Hindle (1921–2011), English footballer
- Will Hindle (1929–1987), American filmmaker
