= Eugenio Monti Olympic Track (1923–2008) =

Coordinates: 46°32′43.8″N 12°7′40.8″E

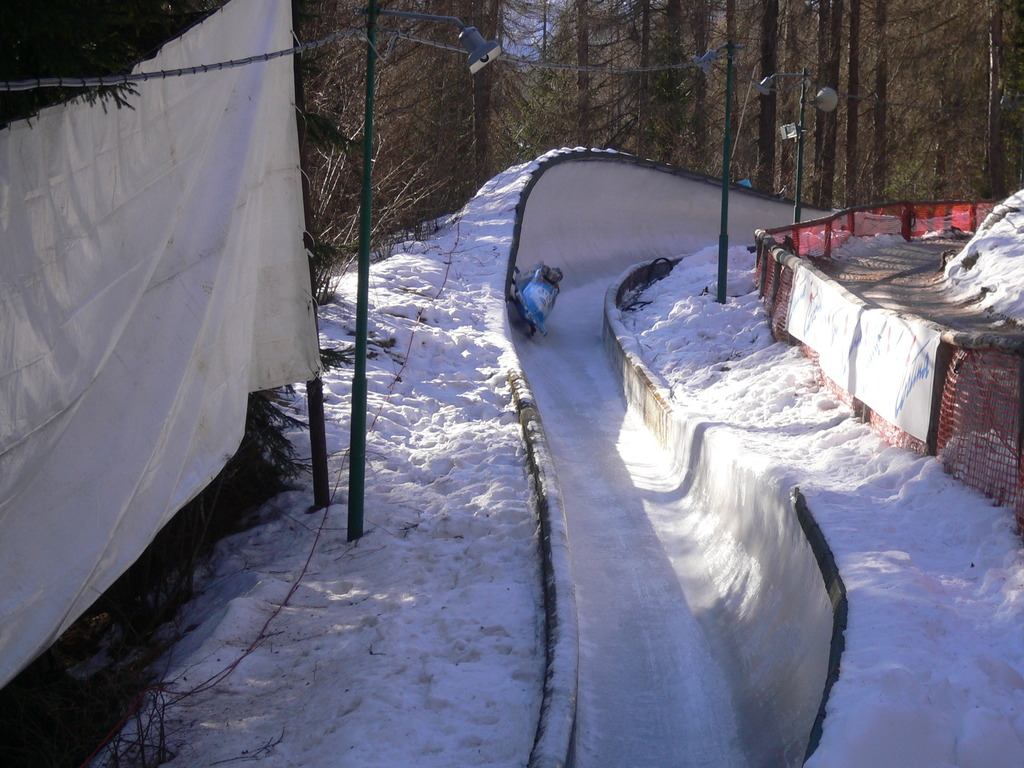
- Unidentified bobsleigh during practice at the track in 2007
- Interactive map of Eugenio Monti Olympic Track
- Full name: Pista Olimpica Eugenio Monti
- Address: via Ronco
- Location: Cortina d'Ampezzo, Italy
- Owner: Comune di Cortina d'Ampezzo
- Operator: Bob Club Cortina
- Surface: Artificial-refrigerated concrete

Construction
- Groundbreaking: 1923
- Opened: 1923
- Renovated: 1936, 1948, 1956, 1981, 2026
- Closed: 2008

The Eugenio Monti Olympic Track (Italian: Pista Olimpica Eugenio Monti) was a bobsleigh and skeleton track located in Cortina d'Ampezzo, Italy. It was named after Eugenio Monti (1928–2003), who won six bobsleigh medals at the Winter Olympic Games between 1956 and 1968 and ten medals at the FIBT World Championships between 1957 and 1966. It was featured in the 1981 James Bond film For Your Eyes Only, held after the 1981 FIBT World Championships, before the track was shortened to its current configuration. In January 2008, after one last bobsleigh race tournament, the track was closed and demolished. It was replaced on the same site by the Cortina Sliding Centre ahead of the 2026 Winter Olympics, which is similar in length and has the same number of curves as the original track, but meets modern design, layout, and safety standards.

== History ==
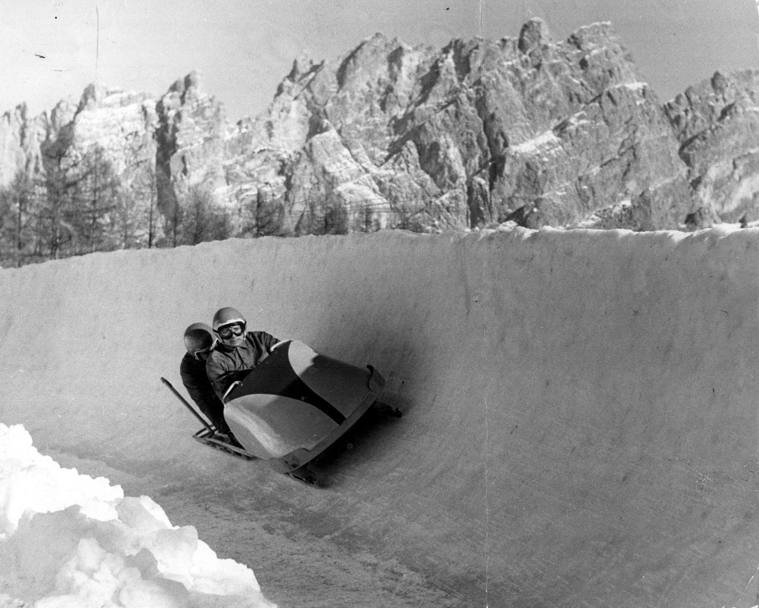
Eugenio Monti and Renzo Alverà (1956)

Bobsleigh at Cortina d'Ampezzo was introduced in 1905-6 using a snow-covered road on the Dolomite Road between Cortina and Pocol. An attempt was made in 1911 to build an artificial bobsleigh run near the centre of Cortina, but that failed due to funding issues. By 1923, a new track 1200 metres in length, was constructed in Ronco, a village near Cortina on the Dolomite Road laid with special water piping constructed into the earth and covered with turf to allow for track freezing.

The track made its international debut in 1928 at the International University Winter Games (forerunner of the Winter Universiade, under administration by the International University Sports Federation), giving the track first notice, increasing its growth. Rebuilding of the track occurred in 1936 to meet the standards of other tracks such as St. Moritz, Switzerland and Garmisch-Partenkirchen, Germany with the finish of the track moving down to the bank of the Boite River. This extended the track length to 1500 metres with 15 turns and a vertical drop of 152 metres. The track hosted its first FIBT World Championships in 1937 in the two-man event. Two years later, it hosted the four-man event of the FIBT World Championships though it would lead to the death of Swiss bobsledder Reto Capadrutt during competition. Another renovation occurred with the track after World War II in 1948, when all of the turns were rebuilt and the track lengthened to 1700 metres and 16 turns.

When the International Olympic Committee awarded the 1956 Winter Olympics to Cortina, the Italian National Olympic Committee (CONI) took over all operations and improvement of the track at considerable expense. Following the 1952 Winter Olympics in Oslo, track officials added large scoreboards, and electronic timing and scoring. The track used for the 1956 Winter Olympics was 1720 metres long with 16 turns and an elevation drop of 152 metres. When a bobsleigh track was not built for the 1960 Winter Olympics in Squaw Valley, California in the United States, the track in Cortina was used to host the world championships that year in place of being excluded from the Winter Olympic Games.

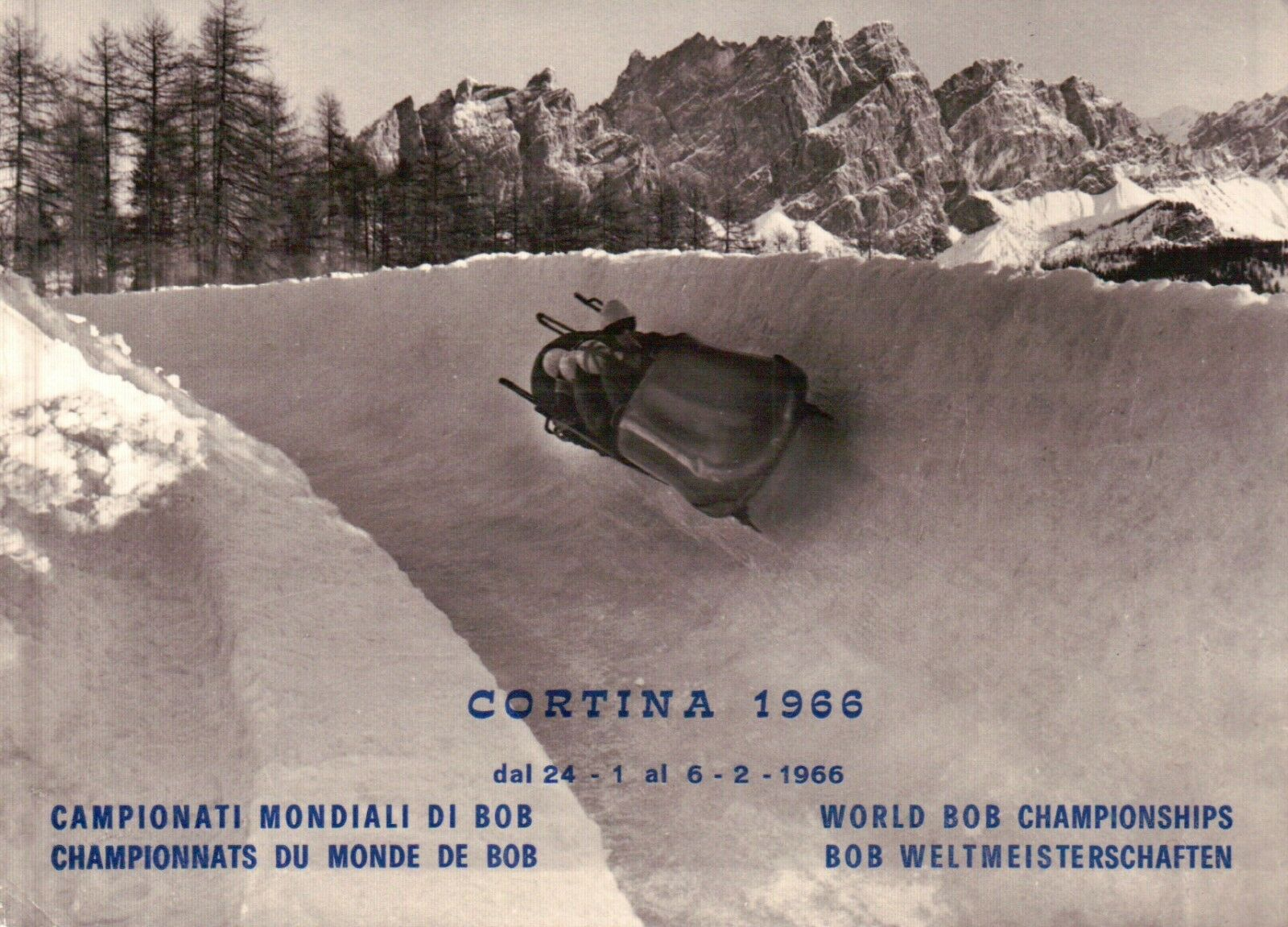
FIBT World Championships 1966

The track played a key role in improving bobsleigh safety when West Germany's Toni Pensperger was killed during the four-man event at the 1966 World Championships. Because of Pensperger's death, the world championships did not take place at the track until safety improvements were made satisfactory to the Fédération Internationale de Bobsleigh et de Tobogganing (FIBT). This was not until 1981, though the death of American bobsledder James Morgan during the four-man event on February 8 led to track officials shortening the course to its current configuration. The week following the 1981 championships, the track was filmed as part of the movie For Your Eyes Only; one of the stuntmen involved, Paolo Rigon, was killed during the first day of filming.

By 1989 the track was deemed safe enough by the FIBT to host another world championship. Following the death of Eugenio Monti in 2003, the Olympic Bobrun Cortina was renamed the Eugenio Monti Track (Italian: Eugenio Monti pista) early the following year. The track was awarded the 2011 World Championships in June 2007 over Winterberg, Germany, and was to have undergone homologation to involve skeleton (last competed in 1992) as well, though that was not done during the 2007-08 Bobsleigh and Skeleton World Cup season. Following some issues with the city of Cortina, the track withdrew its winning bid to host the 2011 championships, leading the FIBT to award the event instead to Königssee, Germany. The track is now artificially refrigerated.

On October 16, 2023, it was reported that the track will not be rebuilt to host the 2026 Winter Olympics, which will be hosted by Cortina D'Ampezzo, along with Milan, as no qualifying construction bids were submitted. The Organizing Committee, along with the IOC and the International Bobsleigh and Skeleton Federation have studied possibilities to hold the event in another place. A bid to completely replace the track was approved in January 2024 with the old venue demolished and despite initial concerns that it may not be ready on time, it was confirmed in September 2024 that the construction was on schedule with homologation of the new track scheduled for March 2025.

== Track statistics ==
The track used for the 1956 Winter Olympics had 16 curves that was 1,700 meters long with an elevation difference of 152 meters. Turns 3 and 5 were not named.

1956 track physical statistics
Turn Number	Name	Reason named
1.	Partenza	"Departure" or "start" in Italian
2.	Vecchia	"Old" in Italian. In the 1981 film For Your Eyes Only, James Bond (Roger Moore) appears on this part of this track while evading East German biathlete Erich Kriegler (John Wyman) and his henchmen.
4.	Stries	
6.	Verzi	
7.	Sento	"Feeling curve" in Italian
8., 9., 10.	Labirinto	"Labyrinth" in Italian
11.	Belvedere	"Lookout" in Italian. Also for a small town near the track.
12.	Bandion	After a small town near the track.
13.	Rettifilo Antelao	"Straightaway before Antelao"
14.	Antelao	After the highest mountain in the eastern Dolomites, South-East of Cortina.
15.	Cristallo	"Crystal" in Italian. Name of another Peak, North-East of the town of Cortina. In the 1981 film For Your Eyes Only, Bond leaps from this corner of the track to escape from Kreigler.
16.	Arrivo	"Finish" in Italian

Following the 1981 FIBT World Championships, the track was shortened to 1350 meters in length with 13 curves, an elevation drop of 120.45 meters, a maximum grade of 15.9%, and an average grade of 9.3%.

Current track statistics
Turn Number	Name	Reason named
1.	Verzi	
2.	Rettifilo Sento	"Straightaway before Sento"
3.	Sento	
4., 5., 6.	Labrinto	
7.	Belvedere	
8.	Bandion	
9.	Rettifilo Antelao	
10.	Antelao	
11.	Cristallo	
12.	Curva Valletta	"Valletta Curve"
13.	Arrivo	

Track records
Sport	Record	Nation - athlete(s)	Date	Time (seconds)
Bobsleigh two-man	Start	Canada - Pierre Lueders & Giulio Zardo	January 19, 2002	4.84
Bobsleigh two-man	Track	Germany - Thomas Florschütz & Sascha Scheleter	January 12, 2006	52.80
Bobsleigh four-man	Start	Switzerland - Martin Annen, Andreas Gees, Beat Hefti, & Cedric Grand	December 19, 2004	4.74
Bobsleigh four-man	Track	France - Bruno Mingeon, Emmanuel Hostache, Christophe Fourquet, & Max Robert	January 16, 2000	51.96
Bobsleigh two-woman	Start	Canada - Helen Upperton & Jennifer Ciochetti	January 12, 2007	5.29
Bobsleigh two-woman	Track	Germany - Sandra Kiriasis & Romy Logsch	January 12, 2007	54.60

== Championships hosted ==
- Winter Olympics: 1956, 2026
- FIBT World Championships: 1937 (Two-man), 1939 (Four-man), 1950, 1954, 1960 (Extraordinary event since bobsleigh was not included for the 1960 Winter Olympics), 1966, 1981, 1989 (Bobsleigh only), 1999 (Bobsleigh only)
- Bobsleigh European Championship: 1965, 1970, 1982, 2000, 2002, 2007
- Bobsleigh Italian Championship: 1930, 1933, 1934, 1935, 1936, 1937, 1938, 1939, 1940, 1949, 1950, 1953, 1954, 1955, 1957, 1958, 1959, 1960, 1962, 1964, 1965, 1966, 1969, 1978, 1980, 1981, 1984, 1985, 1986, 1988, 1991, 1992, 1993, 1995, 2001, 2002, 2003, 2004, 2005, 2007, 2008

== Gallery ==
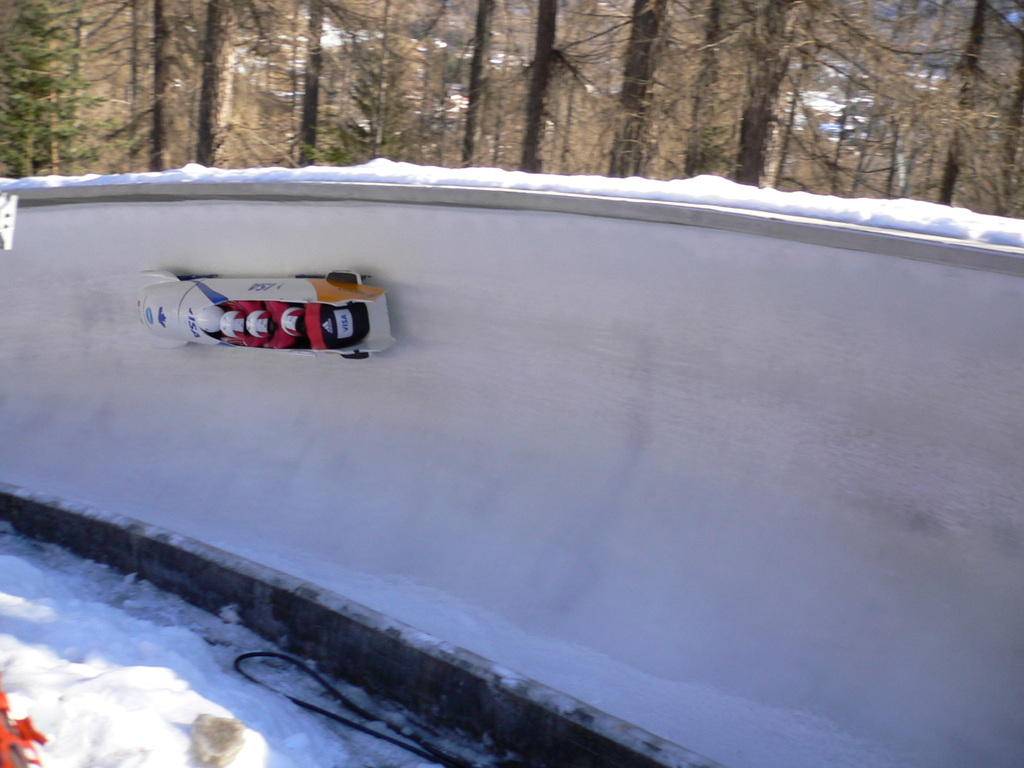

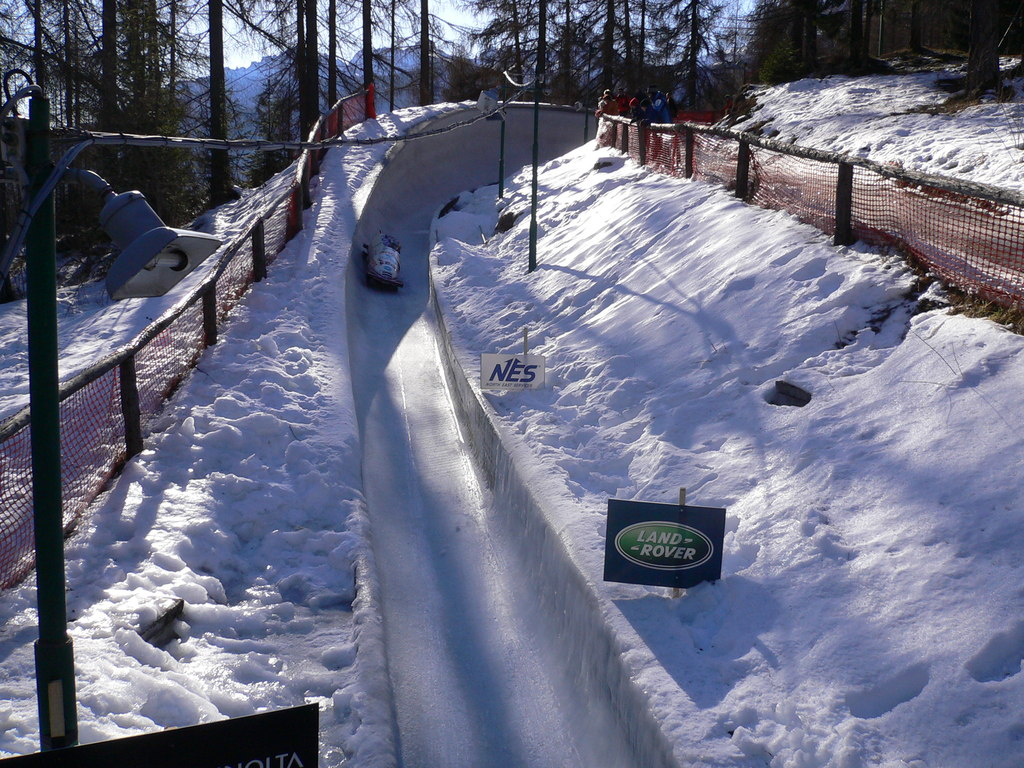

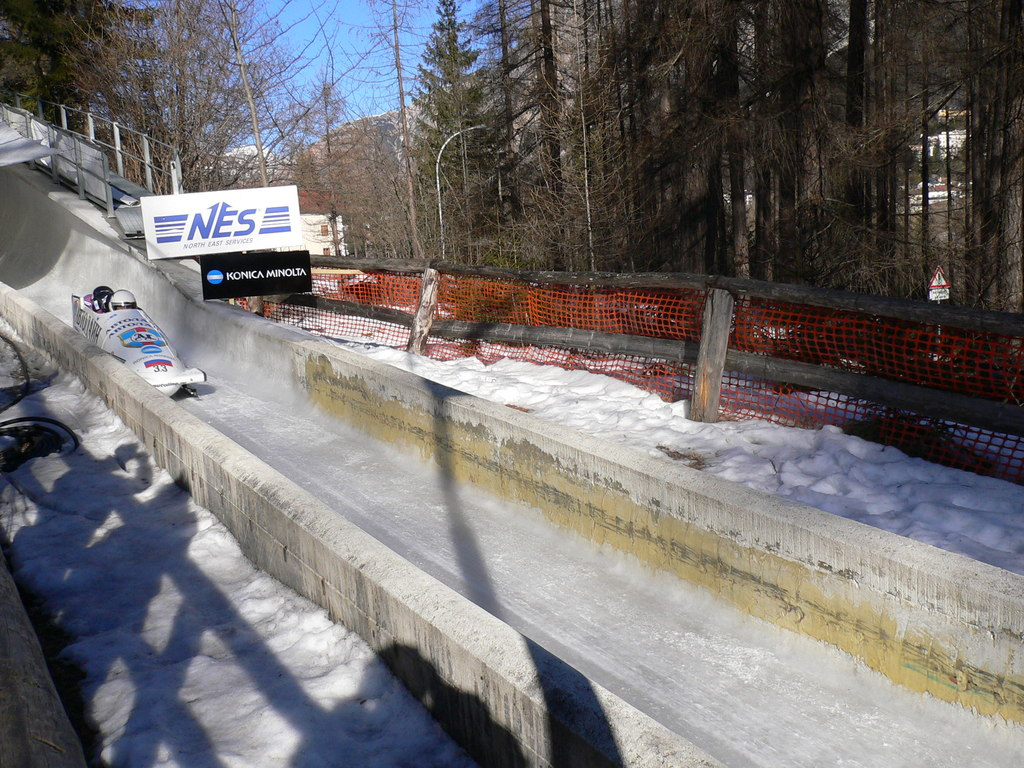

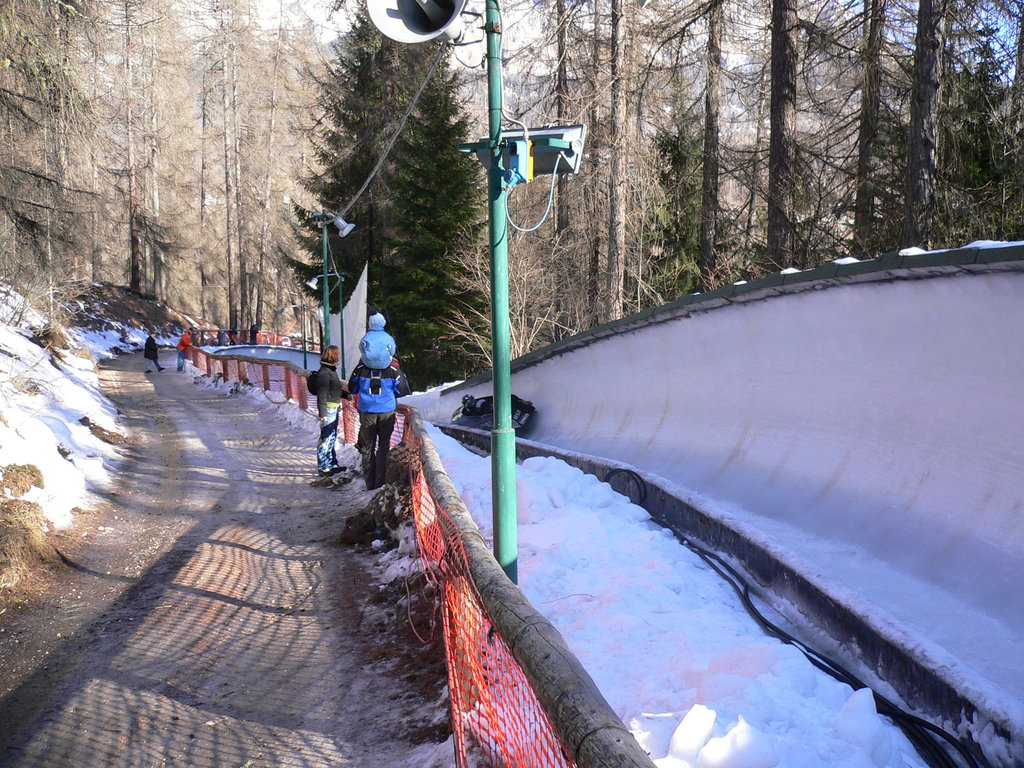

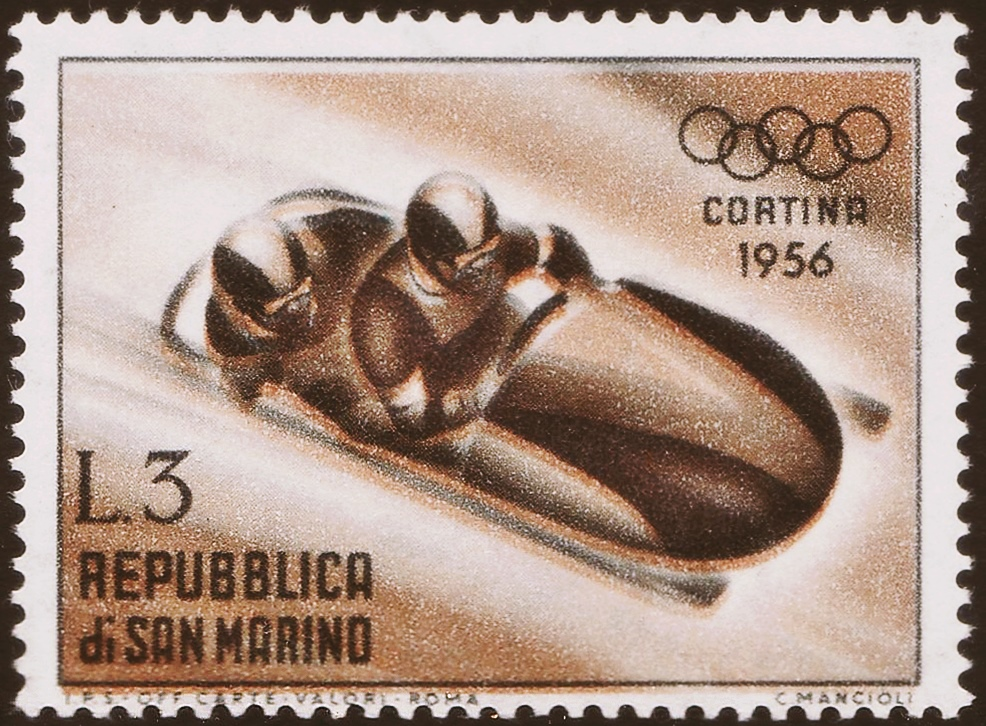
San Marino 1956 stamp

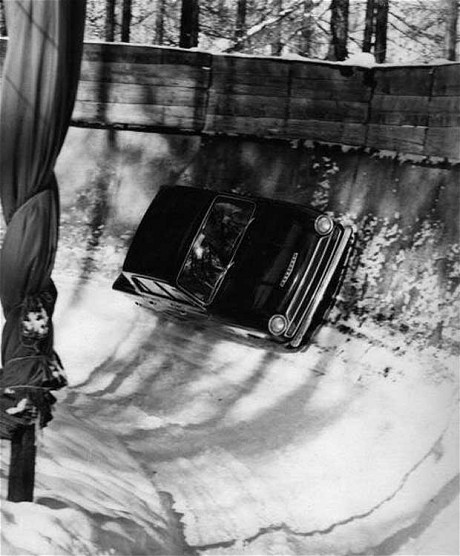
Henry Taylor driving a Ford Cortina down the bobsleigh run (auto-bobbing)

== See also ==
- Italy national bobsleigh team
