= Speed skating at the 1998 Winter Olympics – Men's 1500 metres =

Speed skating at the Olympics

Men's 1500 metres at the XVIII Olympic Winter Games
- Pictogram for speed skating
- Venue: M-Wave
- Dates: 12 February 1998
- Competitors: 45 from 18 nations
- Winning time: 1:47.87 WR

Medalists
1st place, gold medalist(s)		Ådne Søndrål; Norway
2nd place, silver medalist(s)		Ids Postma; Netherlands
3rd place, bronze medalist(s)		Rintje Ritsma; Netherlands

The Men's 1500 Metres in speed skating at the 1998 Winter Olympics took place on 12 February, at the M-Wave arena.

== Records ==
Prior to this competition, the existing world and Olympic records were as follows:

World record	Rintje Ritsma (NED)	1:48.88	Heerenveen, Netherlands	20 December 1997
Olympic record	Johann Olav Koss (NOR)	1:51.29	Hamar, Norway	16 February 1994

Due to the use of clap skates in comparison to the previous Olympics, the Olympic record got broken considerably and the following new world and olympic records were set during the competition.

Date	Pair	Athlete	Country	Time	OR	WR
12 February	Pair 2	Christian Breuer	Germany	1:50.96	OR	
12 February	Pair 6	Hiroyuki Noake	Japan	1:50.49	OR	
12 February	Pair 18	K. C. Boutiette	United States	1:50.06	OR	
12 February	Pair 21	Jan Bos	Netherlands	1:49.75	OR	
12 February	Pair 22	Ådne Søndrål	Norway	1:47.87	OR	WR

== Results ==
Rank	Pair	Lane	Name	Country	Time	Time behind	Notes
1st place, gold medalist(s)	22	I	Ådne Søndrål	Norway	1:47.87	-	WR
2nd place, silver medalist(s)	22	O	Ids Postma	Netherlands	1:48.13	+0.26	
3rd place, bronze medalist(s)	23	O	Rintje Ritsma	Netherlands	1:48.52	+0.65	
4	21	I	Jan Bos	Netherlands	1:49.75	+1.88	
5	18	I	K. C. Boutiette	United States	1:50.04	+2.17	
6	20	O	Martin Hersman	Netherlands	1:50.31	+2.44	
7	17	O	Hiroyuki Noake	Japan	1:50.49	+2.62	
8	18	O	Toru Aoyanagi	Japan	1:50.68	+2.81	
9	2	O	Christian Breuer	Germany	1:50.96	+3.09	
10	14	I	Andrey Anufriyenko	Russia	1:50.99	+3.12	
11	10	O	Vadim Sayutin	Russia	1:51.31	+3.44	
12	12	O	Choi Jae-bong	South Korea	1:51.47	+3.60	
13	16	I	Peter Adeberg	Germany	1:51.50	+3.63	
14	13	O	Dmitry Shepel	Russia	1:51.64	+3.77	
15	14	O	Cheon Ju-hyeon	South Korea	1:51.65	+3.78	
16	16	O	Yusuke Imai	Japan	1:51.70	+3.83	
17	9	I	Bart Veldkamp	Belgium	1:51.73	+3.86	
18	5	O	Marnix ten Kortenaar	Austria	1:51.94	+4.07	
19	7	I	Sergey Tsybenko	Kazakhstan	1:52.03	+4.16	
20	23	I	Kevin Overland	Canada	1:52.07	+4.20	
21	19	I	Keiji Shirahata	Japan	1:52.23	+4.36	
22	4	O	Alexander Kibalko	Russia	1:52.27	+4.40	
23	13	I	Davide Carta	Italy	1:52.44	+4.57	
24	15	O	Ermanno Ioriatti	Italy	1:52.45	+4.58	
25	21	O	Steven Elm	Canada	1:52.70	+4.83	
26	20	I	Kevin Marshall	Canada	1:52.77	+4.90	
27	10	I	Radik Bikchentayev	Kazakhstan	1:52.87	+5.00	
28	5	I	Steinar Johansen	Norway	1:52.88	+5.01	
29	11	O	Brigt Rykkje	Norway	1:52.91	+5.04	
30	19	O	Neal Marshall	Canada	1:52.93	+5.06	
31	3	I	Casey FitzRandolph	United States	1:53.26	+5.39	
32	15	I	Cory Carpenter	United States	1:53.50	+5.63	
33	8	O	Frank Dittrich	Germany	1:53.64	+5.77	
34	3	O	Paweł Zygmunt	Poland	1:53.73	+5.86	
35	17	I	Dave Tamburrino	United States	1:54.19	+6.32	
36	11	I	Wan Chunbo	China	1:54.64	+6.77	
37	12	I	Cédric Kuentz	France	1:54.78	+6.91	
38	6	I	René Taubenrauch	Germany	1:54.91	+7.04	
39	2	I	Jeong Jin-uk	South Korea	1:55.02	+7.15	
40	9	O	Andrew Nicholson	New Zealand	1:55.06	+7.19	
41	1	I	Sergey Kaznacheyev	Kazakhstan	1:55.22	+7.35	
42	6	O	Zsolt Baló	Hungary	1:55.52	+7.65	
43	8	I	Feng Qingbo	China	1:56.45	+8.58	
44	4	I	Dezideriu Horvath	Romania	1:57.35	+9.48	
