= Danshin =

Danshin (masculine), Danshina (feminine) is a Russian surname derived from the dialectal diminutive form Dansha (Даньша) from the given name Danila (Daniel). Notable people with the surname include:

- Igor Danshin
- Ivan Danshin
- Tatyana Danshina
