= 108th =

108th is the ordinal form of the number 108. 108th or One hundred and eighth may also refer to:

- A fraction, 1/108, equal to one of 108 equal parts

== Geography ==
- 108th meridian east, a line of longitude
- 108th meridian west, a line of longitude

== Military ==
- 108th Brigade (disambiguation)
- 108th Division (disambiguation)
- 108th Regiment (disambiguation)

== See also ==
- April 18, 108th day of the year in a standard year
