= Günther Huber =

Italian bobsleigher and luger

Personal information
- Nationality: Italian
- Born: 28 October 1965 (age 60) Bruneck, Italy
- Height: 1.77 m (5 ft 10 in)
- Weight: 89 kg (196 lb)

Sport
- Country: Italy
- Sport: Bobsleigh; Luge
- Club: C.S. Carabinieri
Medal record
Olympic Games
Gold medal – first place	1998 Nagano	Two-man
Bronze medal – third place	1994 Lillehammer	Two-man
World Championships
Gold medal – first place	1999 Cortina d'Ampezzo	Two-man
Silver medal – second place	1997 St. Moritz	Two-man
World Cup
Gold medal – first place	1991-92	Two-man
Gold medal – first place	1992-93	Two-man
Gold medal – first place	1996-97	Combined
Silver medal – second place	1996-97	Two-man
Silver medal – second place	1997-98	Combined
Silver medal – second place	1997-98	Two-man
Bronze medal – third place	1992-93	Combined
Bronze medal – third place	1993-94	Two-man
Bronze medal – third place	1994-95	Combined
Bronze medal – third place	1994-95	Two-man
Bronze medal – third place	1996-97	Four-man

Günther Huber (born 28 October 1965) is an Italian bobsleigher who competed in the 1990s. Before taking up bobsledding, he had originally started his sporting career in luge, with his most notable result being a third place in doubles in the 1982 World Junior Luge Championships; he switched to bobsleigh in 1988.

== Biography ==
Huber was a member of Centro Sportivo Carabinieri. He competed in four Winter Olympics and won two medals in the two-man event with one gold (with Antonio Tartaglia in 1998, shared with Canada's Pierre Lueders and David MacEachern) and one bronze (with Stefano Ticci in 1994).

Huber also won two medals in the two-man event at the FIBT World Championships with a gold in 1999 and a silver in 1997. His World Championship title came at the end of a troubled four-month period during which his bobsleigh was stolen, and then first Tartaglia and his replacements Massimiliano Rota and Enrico Costa were injured, with the latter finally being replaced by Ubaldo Ranzi.

Huber took his first World Cup podium during the 1991-92 season with a third in the two-man event at St. Moritz, and scored his first World Cup race win in another two-man race at Lillehammer the following season. He won the Bobsleigh World Cup championship three times (Two-man: 1991-2, 1992-3; Combined men's: 1996-7).

He also took six medals at the European Championships, including two golds, one each in two-man and four-man competition. In addition, he won eight Italian national titles, seven in two-man and one in four-man.

Huber is a bobsleigh coach for the Italian national team as of 2008. He is the brother of lugers Arnold Huber, Norbert Huber and Wilfried Huber.
