= Kim Ju-hyeon =

Kim Joo-hyun or Kim Ju-hyeon may refer to:

- Kim Joo-hyun (actress)
- Kim Ju-hyeon (speed skater)
