= 108th Division =

In military terms, 108th Division or 108th Infantry Division may refer to:

- 108th Division (People's Republic of China)
- 108th Infantry Division (German Empire)
- 108th Division (Imperial Japanese Army)
- 108th Guards Rifle Division, Soviet Union
- 108th Motor Rifle Division, Soviet Union/Uzbekistan
- 108th Rifle Division, Soviet Union
- 108th Division (United States)

== See also ==
- List of military divisions by number
- 108th Brigade (disambiguation)
- 108th Regiment (disambiguation)
- 108th (disambiguation)
