= Kim Ok-hui =

Kim Ok-hui may refer to:

- Kim Ok-hui (volleyball)
- Kim Ok-hui (speed skater)
