= Anna Savelyeva =

Russian speed skater

Personal information
- Nationality: Russian
- Born: 29 July 1977 (age 47); Moscow, Soviet Union

Sport
- Sport: Speed skating

Anna Savelyeva (born 29 July 1977) is a Russian speed skater. She competed in the women's 1000 metres at the 1998 Winter Olympics.
