= 108th Regiment of Foot =

108th Regiment of Foot may refer to:

- 108th Regiment of Foot (1761), raised in 1761
- 108th Regiment of Foot (1794), raised in 1794
- 108th (Madras Infantry) Regiment of Foot, raised by the East India Company and placed on the British establishment as the 108th Foot in 1862
