= 108th Infantry Division (German Empire) =

108th Infantry Division (108. Infanterie-Division)
- Active: 1915–18
- Country: German Empire
- Branch: Army
- Type: Infantry
- Size: Approx. 12,500
- Engagements: World War I: Eastern Front; Brusilov Offensive

The 108th Infantry Division (German: 108. Infanterie-Division) was a formation of the Imperial German Army in World War I. The division was formed in May 1915 as "Division Beckmann" (named for its commander, Max Beckmann) and became the 108th Infantry Division on November 7, 1915. It was part of a wave of new infantry divisions formed in 1915. The division was disbanded in September 1918 and its assets distributed to other units.

The division was formed primarily from the excess infantry regiments of existing divisions which were being triangularized. The division's 97th Infantry Regiment came from the 42nd Infantry Division; the 137th Infantry Regiment came from the 31st Infantry Division; and the 265th Reserve Infantry Regiment came from the 80th Reserve Division.

== Combat chronicle ==
The 108th Infantry Division initially served on the Eastern Front, serving in the Baltic region until June 1916. It then went south to the front in Ukraine on the Styr River where it faced the Brusilov Offensive and then remained in the line until the armistice on the Eastern Front in December 1917. The division was then sent to the Western Front, entering the line north of the Ailette River, where it remained until April 1918. It then fought in the Somme region until it was dissolved on September 19, 1918. Allied intelligence rated the division as third class.

== Order of battle on formation ==
The 108th Infantry Division was formed as a triangular division. The order of battle of the division on October 3, 1915, was as follows:

- 5. Infanterie-Brigade
  - 1. Oberrheinisches Infanterie-Regiment Nr. 97
  - 2. Unter-Elsässisches Infanterie-Regiment Nr. 137
  - Reserve-Infanterie-Regiment Nr. 265
- Reserve-Dragoner-Regiment Nr. 1
- Feldartillerie-Regiment Nr. 243
- 1. Kompanie/Reserve-Pionier-Bataillon Nr. 1

== Late-war order of battle ==
The division underwent relatively few organizational changes over the course of the war. Cavalry was reduced, artillery and signals commands were formed, and combat engineer support was expanded to a full pioneer battalion. The order of battle on April 26, 1918, was as follows:

- 5. Infanterie-Brigade
  - 1. Oberrheinisches Infanterie-Regiment Nr. 97
  - 2. Unter-Elsässisches Infanterie-Regiment Nr. 137
  - Reserve-Infanterie-Regiment Nr. 265
- 6. Eskadron/Braunschweigisches Husaren-Regiment Nr. 17
- Artillerie-Kommandeur 29
  - Feldartillerie-Regiment Nr. 243
  - II. Bataillon Reserve-Fußartillerie-Regiment Nr. 4 (from May 4, 1918)
- Pionier-Bataillon Nr. 108
  - 1. Reserve-Kompanie/Pionier-Bataillon Nr. 1
  - 1. Reserve-Kompanie/Pionier-Bataillon Nr. 33
  - Minenwerfer-Kompanie Nr. 108
- Divisions-Nachrichten-Kommandeur 108
