= Ken Leblanc (bobsleigh) =

Canadian bobsledder

Personal information
- Born: February 13, 1968 (age 58) Ottawa, Ontario, Canada
Medal record
Bobsleigh
World Championships
Bronze medal – third place	1999 Cortina d'Ampezzo	Four-man

Kenneth Leblanc (born February 13, 1968) is a Canadian bobsledder who competed in the late 1980s and early 1990s. He then returned to bobsleigh in 1997 and competed until the 2002 Winter Olympics in Salt Lake City.

Leblanc won a bronze medal in the four-man event at the 1999 FIBT World Championships in Cortina d'Ampezzo. He was also part of the four-man team that won the overall World Cup in 1989-90.

Competing in four Winter Olympics, his best finish was fourth in the four-man event at Albertville in 1992.

Prior to his career in bobsleigh, Leblanc also competed in athletics
