= Martin Hersman =

Dutch speed skater

Personal information
- Born: 26 February 1974 (age 52) Sassenheim, the Netherlands
- Height: 1.88 m (6 ft 2 in)
- Weight: 89 kg (196 lb)

Sport
- Country: Netherlands
- Sport: Speed skating
- Club: Sassenheimse IJsclub
- Turned pro: 1991
- Retired: 2003

Achievements and titles
- Personal best(s): 500 m: 36.38 (2002); 1000 m: 1:10.17 (2002); 1500 m: 1:46.76 (2002); 5000 m: 6:31.62 (2002); 10 000 m: 14:01.42 (2002)
Medal record
European Championships
Bronze medal – third place	1996 Heerenveen	Allround
World Championships
Bronze medal – third place	1996 Hamar	1500 m
Bronze medal – third place	1997 Warsaw	1000 m

Martinus Anthonius Johannes Maria "Martin" Hersman (born 26 February 1974) is a retired speed skater from the Netherlands who was active between 1992 and 2003. He competed at the 1994 and 1998 Winter Olympics in 1000 and 1500 m; his best achievement was sixth place in the 1500 m event in 1998.

He won a bronze allround medal at the European Speed Skating Championships for Men in 1996 and two bronze medals at the single distance world championships: in the 1500 m (1996) and 1000 m (1997). Nationally, he won the 1500 m event in 2000 and 2002.

== Personal records ==
Personal records
Men's speed skating
Event	Result	Date	Location	Notes
500 m	36.38	27 January 2002	Olympic Oval, Calgary	
1000 m	1:10.17	27 January 2002	Olympic Oval, Calgary	
1500 m	1:46.76	26 January 2002	Olympic Oval, Calgary	
3000 m	3:46.81	11 August 2002	Olympic Oval, Calgary	
5000 m	6:31.62	28 January 2002	Olympic Oval, Calgary	
10000 m	14:01.42	7 February 1999	Vikingskipet, Hamar	

Hersman has a score of 153.199 points on the Adelskalender.

== Tournament overview ==
Season	Dutch Championships Single Distances	Dutch Championships Allround	Dutch Championships Sprint	European Championships Allround	Olympic Games	World Championships Single Distances	World Championships Allround	World Championships Juniors
1992–93								BASELGA di PINÈ 7th 500m (gold) 3000m (silver) 1500m 8th 5000m 4th overall
1993–94	HEERENVEEN (silver) 1500m				LILLEHAMMER 8th 1500m			
1994–95	THE HAGUE (bronze) 5000m			HEERENVEEN 6th 500m 9th 5000m (bronze) 1500m 8th 10000m 6th overall				
1995–96		THE HAGUE (silver) 500m 6th 5000m (gold) 1500m 6th 10000m (bronze) overall		HEERENVEEN 6th 500m 4th 5000m (bronze) 1500m 5th 10000m (bronze) overall		HAMAR (bronze) 1500m	INZELL 9th 500m 4th 5000m 7th 1500m 10th 10000m 6th overall	
1996–97		ASSEN (bronze) 500m 5th 5000m 5th 1500m 6th 10000m 4th overall				WARSAW (bronze) 1000m 4th 1500m		
1997–98	HEERENVEEN (silver) 1500m				NAGANO 12th 1000m 6th 1500m	CALGARY 13th 1000m		
1998–99				HEERENVEEN (bronze) 500m 10th 5000m 5th 1500m 12th 10000m 6th overall		HEERENVEEN 18th 1500m	HAMAR 6th 500m 13th 5000m (bronze) 1500m 9th 10000m 7th overall	
1999–2000	DEVENTER (bronze) 1000m (gold) 1500m (bronze) 5000m							
2000–01								
2001–02	GRONINGEN (gold) 1500m							
2002–03	UTRECHT (silver) 1500m		GRONINGEN 7th 500m (silver) 1000m 11th 500m (gold) 1000m 4th overall					

== Medals won ==
Championship	Gold (gold)	Silver (silver)	Bronze (bronze)
Dutch Allround	1	1	2
European Allround	0	0	4
Dutch Single Distances	2	3	3
World Single Distances	0	0	2
World Allround	0	0	1
