= Jeong Jin-uk =

South Korean speed skater

Personal information
- Nationality: South Korean
- Born: 9 October 1978 (age 46)

Sport
- Sport: Speed skating

Jeong Jin-uk (born 9 October 1978) is a South Korean speed skater. He competed in the men's 1500 metres event at the 1998 Winter Olympics.
