= Ubaldo Ranzi =

Italian bobsledder and decathlete

Personal information
- National team: Italy (athletics): 6 caps (1993-1996)
- Born: 18 July 1970 (age 56) Templecombe, Great Britain

Sport
- Sport: Athletics; Bobsleigh
- Events: Combined events (athletics); Two-man bob (bobsleigh)
- Club: G.S. Fiamme Azzurre
- Retired: 1999 (athletics)

Achievements and titles
- Personal best: Decathlon: 7,930 pt (1996)
Medal record
Bobsleigh
World Championships
Gold medal – first place	1999 Cortina d'Ampezzo	Two-man
European Championships
Silver medal – second place	2000 Cortina d'Ampezzo	Two-man

Ubaldo Ranzi (born 18 July 1970) is a former Italian decathlete and bobsledder who competed in the late 1990s and the early 2000s.

== Biography ==
Born in England to an Italian father and a British mother, he won a gold medal in the two-man event at the 1999 FIBT World Championships in Cortina d'Ampezzo and won a silver medal (with Gunther Huber), in 2000 always in Cortina d'Ampezzo.

Before starting his bobsleigh career he collected 6 caps in Italy national athletics team from 1993 to 1996. Ranzi held the fourth performance of all-time of Italy in the speciality of the decathlon.

== Doping ==
An anti-doping test done at the end of the season, September 1998, during the Italian championships, confirmed the presence of Salbutamol (Ventolin) in the athlete's urine, also confirmed by the counter-analysis. Ubaldo Ranzi, suffering from asthma since birth, was treated and authorized by the federation and CONI to use Ventolin, therefore always declared, in the numerous anti-doping tests to which he was subjected. The case opened on August 3, 1999 was then archived in September 1999. Confirming the correctness and transparency of the whole athlete's sporting career. https://archiviostorico.gazzetta.it//1999/agosto/04/Ranzi_positivo_non_colpevole_ga_0_990804374.shtml https://archiviostorico.gazzetta.it//1999/settembre/16/Ranzi_caso_archiviato_ga_0_9909165069.shtml

== National titles ==
Athletics

Ubaldo Ranzi has won several times the individual national championship.

- 1 win in the decathlon (1993)

== See also ==
- Italian all-time lists - Decathlon
