= 80th Reserve Division =

80th Reserve Division (80. Reserve-Division)
- Active: 1914-1919
- Country: Germany
- Branch: Army
- Type: Infantry
- Size: Approx. 12,500
- Engagements: World War I: Second Battle of the Masurian Lakes, Battle of Arras (1917), Passchendaele, German spring offensive, First Battle of the Somme (1918), Oise-Aisne Offensive, Meuse-Argonne Offensive

The 80th Reserve Division (80. Reserve-Division) was a unit of the Imperial German Army in World War I. The division was formed at the end of December 1914 and organized over the next month, arriving in the line in early February 1915. It was part of the second large wave of new divisions formed at the outset of World War I, which were numbered the 75th through 82nd Reserve Divisions. The division was initially part of XXXX Reserve Corps. The division was disbanded in 1919 during the demobilization of the German Army after World War I. The division was mixed in recruitment. The 264th Reserve Infantry Regiment was from Thuringia, and was described as a Saxe-Altenburg regiment. The 265th Reserve Infantry Regiment was from the Grand Duchy of Mecklenburg-Schwerin. The 266th was also formed in the Grand Duchy of Mecklenburg-Schwerin, but reportedly included recruits from Mecklenburg-Strelitz, Pomerania and other areas. The 34th Reserve Infantry Regiment, which replaced the 265th in 1915, was from West Prussia.

== Combat chronicle ==
The 80th Reserve Division initially fought on the Eastern Front, seeing its first action in the Second Battle of the Masurian Lakes. In 1915, it fought in the siege of Kaunas and the battles of Nemunas and Vilnius. From October 1915 to December 1916, the division was engaged in positional warfare, and fought in battles along Lake Narach, after which it was transferred to the Western Front. It was in reserve and then engaged in positional warfare in Flanders and the Artois until April 1917, when it fought in the Battle of Arras. Later in 1917, it fought in the Battle of Passchendaele and resisted the French offensive at Verdun. The division participated in the German 1918 Spring Offensive, fighting in the First Battle of the Somme (1918), also called the Second Battle of the Somme (to distinguish it from the 1916 battle). It later resisted various Allied counteroffensives, including the Oise-Aisne Offensive and the Meuse-Argonne Offensive. Allied intelligence rated the division as third class.

== Order of battle on formation ==
The 80th Reserve Division, like the other divisions of its wave and unlike earlier German divisions, was organized from the outset as a triangular division. The order of battle of the division on December 29, 1914, was as follows:

- 80.Reserve-Infanterie-Brigade
  - Reserve-Infanterie-Regiment Nr. 264
  - Reserve-Infanterie-Regiment Nr. 265
  - Reserve-Infanterie-Regiment Nr. 266
  - Reserve-Radfahrer-Kompanie Nr. 80
- Reserve-Kavallerie-Abteilung Nr. 80
- 80.Reserve-Feldartillerie-Brigade
  - Reserve-Feldartillerie-Regiment Nr. 65
  - Reserve-Feldartillerie-Regiment Nr. 66
- Reserve-Pionier-Kompanie Nr. 82
- Reserve-Pionier-Kompanie Nr. 83

== Order of battle on March 29, 1918 ==
The most significant wartime structural change in the divisions of this wave was the reduction from two field artillery regiments to one. Over the course of the war, other changes took place, including the formation of artillery and signals commands and the enlargement of combat engineer support to a full pioneer battalion. The order of battle on March 29, 1918, was as follows:

- 80.Reserve-Infanterie-Brigade
  - Reserve-Infanterie-Regiment Nr. 34
  - Reserve-Infanterie-Regiment Nr. 264
  - Reserve-Infanterie-Regiment Nr. 266
- 4.Eskadron/Husaren-Regiment Kaiser Franz Josef von Österreich, König von Ungarn (Schleswig-Holsteinisches) Nr. 16
- Artillerie-Kommandeur 80
  - Reserve-Feldartillerie-Regiment Nr. 66
  - III.Bataillon/Fußartillerie-Regiment Nr. 27 (from August 10, 1918)
- Pionier-Bataillon Nr. 380
  - Reserve-Pionier-Kompanie Nr. 82
  - Reserve-Pionier-Kompanie Nr. 83
  - Minenwerfer-Kompanie Nr. 280
- Divisions-Nachrichten-Kommandeur 480
