= Ji Xiaoou =

Chinese freestyle skier

Personal information
- Born: 11 June 1980 (age 46) Baishan, China

Sport
- Country: China
- Sport: Freestyle skiing

Ji Xiaoou (born 11 June 1980) is a Chinese freestyle skier. She was born in Baishan. She competed at the 1994 Winter Olympics, in women's aerials, and also at the 1998 Winter Olympics.
