= 108th Brigade =

In military terms, 108th Brigade or 108th Infantry Brigade may refer to:

== Germany ==
- 108th Panzer Brigade

== Soviet Union ==
- 108th Anti-Aircraft Missile Brigade

== Ukraine ==
- 108th Territorial Defense Brigade, a unit of the Ukrainian Territorial Defense Forces

== United Kingdom ==
- 108th Brigade (United Kingdom), a British Army formation during World War I
- 108th Brigade, Royal Field Artillery, a British Army unit during World War I
- 108th (Norfolk Yeomanry) Brigade, Royal Field Artillery, a British Army unit after World War I

== United States ==
- 108th Air Defense Artillery Brigade, an air defense artillery brigade of the United States Army
- 108th Sustainment Brigade, a sustainment brigade of the United States Army National Guard in Illinois

== See also ==
- 108th Division (disambiguation)
- 108th Regiment (disambiguation)
