= Enrico Costa (bobsledder) =

Italian bobsledder (born 1971)

Medal record

Bobsleigh

World Championships
Gold medal – first place	1999 Cortina d'Ampezzo	Two-man

Enrico Costa (born 17 June 1971) is an Italian bobsledder who competed from 1994 to the early 2000s. He won a gold medal in the two-man event at the 1999 FIBT World Championships in Cortina d'Ampezzo. Costa also competed at the 1998 Winter Olympics, finishing 14th in the two-man event and 20th in the four-man event.
