= Chris Blanchard =

Canadian cross-country skier (born 1971)

Chris Blanchard (born 22 April 1971), a Canadian former cross-country skier, competed in the 1998 Winter Olympics.
