= Kim Ok-hui (speed skater) =

North Korean speed skater (born 1979)

Personal information
- Nationality: North Korean
- Born: 6 October 1979 (age 46)

Sport
- Sport: Speed skating

Kim Ok-hui (born 6 October 1979) is a North Korean speed skater. She competed in the women's 1000 metres at the 1998 Winter Olympics.
