= 108th Regiment of Foot (1794) =

- Active: 1794-1795
- Country: United Kingdom
- Branch: Infantry

The 108th Regiment of Foot was an infantry regiment of the British Army from 1794 to 1796.

It was raised in Ireland in May 1794 as the Earl of Granard's Regiment, and numbered as the 108th in November of the same year. Shortly thereafter the 108th moved to Gibraltar for garrison duty. The regiment was broken up there in 1796 with the men drafted into the 64th and 85th Regiments of Foot.
