= Tyler Seitz =

Canadian luger (born 1976)

Personal information
- Born: 13 August 1976 (age 48); Calgary, Alberta, Canada

Sport
- Sport: Luge

Tyler Seitz (born 13 August 1976) is a Canadian luger. He competed at the 1998 Winter Olympics and the 2002 Winter Olympics.
