= Sascha Scheleter =

German bobsledder (born 1985)

Sascha Schelter (born 13 January 1985) is a German bobsledder who competed from 2003 to 2008. He finished fifth in the Bobsleigh World Cup four-man in 2008 in Calgary.
