= Bruno Mingeon =

French bobsledder (born 1967)

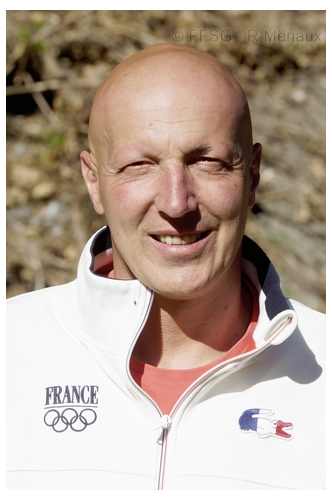

Medal record

Bobsleigh

Olympic Games
Bronze medal – third place	1998 Nagano	Four-man

World Championships
Gold medal – first place	1999 Cortina d'Ampezzo	Four-man
Bronze medal – third place	1999 Cortina d'Ampezzo	Two-man

Bruno Mingeon (born 7 September 1967 in Bourg-Saint-Maurice, Savoie) is a French bobsleigher who competed from 1988 to 2006. Competing in five Winter Olympics, he won a bronze medal in the four-man event (tied with Great Britain) at Nagano in 1998. He was born in Bourg-Saint-Maurice.

At the 1999 FIBT World Championships in Cortina d'Ampezzo, Mingeon won a gold in the four-man event and a bronze in the two-man event.
