= Frederick Hindle =

Frederick Hindle may refer to:

- Frederick Hindle (politician, born 1848) (1848–1925), British Liberal politician, MP for Darwen January–December 1910
- Frederick Hindle (politician, born 1877) (1877–1953), British Liberal politician, MP for Darwen 1923–1924
