= FIBT World Championships 1999 =

Bobsleigh and skeleton competition

1999 World Championships
- Location: Cortina d'Ampezzo, Italy; Altenberg, Germany

The FIBT World Championships 1999 took place in Cortina d'Ampezzo, Italy (Bobsleigh) and Altenberg, Germany (Skeleton). Cortina hosted the championships for the ninth time, previously doing so in 1937 (Two-man), 1939 (Four-man), 1950, 1954, 1960, 1966, 1981, and 1989 (Bobsleigh). Altenberg hosted the championship event for the third time, doing so previously in 1991 (Bobsleigh) and 1994 (Skeleton).

== Two man bobsleigh ==
Pos	Team	Time
Gold	Italy (Günther Huber, Enrico Costa, Ubaldo Ranzi)	
Silver	Germany (Christoph Langen, Markus Zimmermann)	
Bronze	France (Bruno Mingeon, Emmanuel Hostache)	

Ranzi replaced the injured Costa after the first heat of this event.

== Four man bobsleigh ==
Pos	Team	Time
Gold	France (Bruno Mingeon, Emmanuel Hostache, Éric Le Chanony, Max Robert)	
Silver	Switzerland (Marcel Rohner, Markus Nüssli, Beat Hefti, Silvio Schaufelberger)	
Bronze	Canada (Pierre Lueders, Ken Leblanc, Ben Hindle, Matt Hindle)	

The French earned its first ever gold medal at the championships.

== Men's skeleton ==
Pos	Athlete	Time
Gold	Jim Shea (USA)	
Silver	Andy Böhme (GER)	
Bronze	Willi Schneider (GER)	

Shea is the first American to win a world championship since 1959.

== Medal table ==
Rank	Nation	Gold	Silver	Bronze	Total
1	France (FRA)	1	0	1	2
2	Italy (ITA)	1	0	0	1
2	United States (USA)	1	0	0	1
4	Germany (GER)	0	2	1	3
5	Switzerland (SUI)	0	1	0	1
6	Canada (CAN)	0	0	1	1
Totals (6 entries)		3	3	3	9
