= Wu Fenglong =

Chinese speed skater

Personal information
- Nationality: Chinese
- Born: 4 August 1977 (age 47)

Sport
- Sport: Speed skating

Wu Fenglong (born 4 August 1977) is a Chinese speed skater. He competed in the men's 1000 metres event at the 1998 Winter Olympics.
