= Igor Danshin =

Soviet soldier (1905–1961)

Igor Mikhailovich Danshin
- Danshin, 29 April 1955
- Born: 5 June 1905; Kerki, Bukhara, Russian Empire
- Died: 28 August 1961 (aged 56) Leningrad, Soviet Union
- Allegiance: Soviet Union
- Branch: Red Army (later Soviet Army)
- Service years: 1925–1960
- Rank: Major general of Artillery
- Commands: 22nd Anti-Aircraft Artillery Division
- Conflicts: World War II
- Awards: Order of Lenin; Order of the Red Banner (2)

Igor Mikhailovich Danshin (Russian: Игорь Михайлович Даньшин; 5 June 1905 – 28 August 1961) was a Soviet Army major general of artillery who commanded the 22nd Anti-Aircraft Artillery Division during World War II.

== Early life and prewar service ==
An ethnic Russian, Igor Mikhailovich Danshin was born on 5 June 1905 in the city of Kerki, Bukhara. Before joining the Red Army, he worked as a senior clerk in the 8th Border Detachment of the OGPU in Naryn and in May 1924 became a secretary in the governorate local economic department in Alma-Ata. Danshin voluntarily entered the 1st Leningrad Red October Artillery School on 7 September 1925. After his graduation in September 1929, Danshin was sent to the 9th Artillery Regiment of the North Caucasus Military District at Rostov-on-Don, where he served successively as a firing platoon commander, training battery platoon commander, and assistant chief of the regimental reconnaissance units.

After completing studies at the Engineering and Command Department of the Dzerzhinsky Red Army Artillery Academy from December 1932 to January 1938, Danshin, promoted to captain on 6 November 1937, was appointed head of the shooting and gunnery training department of the Artillery-Rifle Committee of the Anti-Aircraft Artillery Officers Command Course (KUKS) in Yevpatoria. He was promoted to major on 28 March 1939 and became head of the department of instruments and direction finders there in August of that year. During his time at the course, Danshin developed and published several teaching aids and instructions: rules for grenade firing, firing tubes, and calculation of the discrepancy between tabulated and actual fuse burning times.

Danshin returned to operational units in November 1940 as commander of the artillery regiment of the 10th Mechanized Brigade of the Leningrad Military District. After the disbandment of the regiment in April 1941, he was appointed chief of staff of the Svir PVO Brigade Region, forming the brigade region headquarters and organizing the air defense of key points in its zone of responsibility.

== World War II ==
After the beginning of the war on the Eastern Front, the Svir PVO Brigade Region became crucial as it provided air defense for the only supply route for besieged Leningrad. In 1941, the anti-aircraft gunners of the region were credited with destroying 124 aircraft. In January 1942 Danshin was appointed chief of the air defense department of the 55th Army, being promoted lieutenant colonel on 13 February, and in January 1943 became deputy chief of the artillery of the 55th Army for air defense. in this position he participated in defensive battles in the area of Nevskaya Dubrovka and Kamenka during the Siege of Leningrad.

Promoted to colonel on 14 February 1943, Danshin was appointed commander of the 22nd Anti-Aircraft Artillery Division of the Reserve of the High Command (RGK) in March. He oversaw the formation of the division and departed with it to the Southwestern Front, which became the 3rd Ukrainian Front on 20 October of that year. The division supported the 3rd Guards Army and the 8th Guards Army during the Izyum–Barvenkovo offensive, Donbas strategic offensive, Zaporozhye offensive, the Nikopol–Krivoi Rog offensive, and the Bereznegovatoye–Snigirevka offensive from the summer of 1943 to the spring of 1944. The division received the name of Zaporozhye as an honorific on 14 October 1943 in recognition of its performance during the capture of the city, and Danshin was awarded the Order of the Red Banner on 20 November. During the Second Jassy–Kishinev offensive and in fighting in Bulgaria and Yugoslavia, the division supported the raid of the 4th Guards Mechanized Corps. On 7 September 1944 the 22nd was awarded the Order of Kutuzov, 2nd class for "exemplary fulfillment of command tasks" in breaking through enemy defenses south of Bender and the capture of Kishinev and its "valor and courage".

The division, reinforced with tanks and infantry, acted as an assault group during the battle for Belgrade, participating in the capture of the royal palace, parliament building, post and telegraph office, and the military academy. Danshin was promoted to major general of artillery on 18 November. The 22nd supported the raid of the 18th Tank Corps during the Budapest offensive and operated in conjunction with the 5th Guards Tank Army during the Vienna offensive. The division was awarded the Order of Bogdan Khmelnitsky, 2nd class, on 26 April 1945 in recognition of its performance in the capture of Pápa and Devecser. From 1943 to the end of the war, the division was credited with destroying 264 aircraft, up to 3 infantry regiments, capturing up to 10,000 soldiers and officers, knocking out 45 tanks, burning three railway echelons, and suppressing the fire of 15 batteries. For his skillful leadership of the division during operations in Hungary and Yugoslavia, Danshin received the Order of Bogdan Khmelnitsky, 2nd class, on 28 April 1945, and the Yugoslav Order of Merits for the People, 1st class, in 1946.

== Postwar ==
After the end of the war, Danshin was transferred to the Dzerzhinsky Artillery Academy in August 1945, serving as an instructor and senior instructor in the anti-aircraft artillery tactics department. In August 1946 he was sent to the Group of Soviet Occupation Forces in Germany where he became deputy commander of the 4th Breakthrough Artillery Corps RGK for anti-aircraft artillery. From May 1950 Danshin served as deputy commander-in-chief of the artillery of the Belorussian Military District for anti-aircraft artillery. His final post was as chief of the Central Anti-Aircraft Artillery KUOS (later renamed the Central Anti-Aircraft Artillery Officers' Courses) from August 1956. Danshin was retired due to illness on 11 January 1960 and died on 28 August 1961.

== Awards and decorations ==
Danshin was a recipient of the following awards and decorations:

- Order of Lenin
- Order of the Red Banner (2)
- Order of Bogdan Khmelnitsky, 2nd class
- Order of the Patriotic War, 2nd class
- Order of the Red Star
- Medals
- Foreign orders, including the Yugoslav Order of Merits for the People, 1st class
