= Feng Qingbo =

Chinese speed skater

Personal information
- Nationality: Chinese
- Born: 12 December 1974 (age 50)

Sport
- Sport: Speed skating

Feng Qingbo (born 12 December 1974) is a Chinese speed skater. He competed in the men's 1500 metres event at the 1998 Winter Olympics.
