= 108th Division (People's Republic of China) =

108th Division (1950–52)
- Active: 1950.2 - 1952.2
- Country: People's Republic of China
- Branch: People's Liberation Army
- Type: Division
- Role: Infantry
- Part of: 36th Corps
- Garrison/HQ: Hengshui, Hebei

The 108th Division (Chinese: 第108师) was created in February 1950 under the Regulation of the Redesignations of All Organizations and Units of the Army, issued by Central Military Commission on November 1, 1948, basing on the 310th Division and 2 regiments from 3rd Independent Security Brigade, 111th Corps of Republic of China Army defected on September 19, 1949 during the Chinese Civil War.

The division was part of 36th Corps.

In April 1951 the division became a cadre division.

In February 1952 the division was disbanded.
