= Wan Chunbo =

Chinese speed skater

Personal information
- Nationality: Chinese
- Born: 13 January 1973 (age 52)

Sport
- Sport: Speed skating

Wan Chunbo (born 13 January 1973) is a Chinese speed skater. He competed in the men's 1500 metres event at the 1998 Winter Olympics.
