= Michelle Collard =

Canadian biathlete

Michelle Collard (born 13 August 1975) is a Canadian former biathlete who competed in the 1998 Winter Olympics. Her nickname is "Tuppy". She carried the Olympic torch 300m on the relay route in Prince George during the 2010 Winter Olympics in Vancouver, Canada.
