= Sylvie Cantin =

Canadian speed skater

Personal information
- Born: 15 March 1970 (age 55) Loretteville, Quebec, Canada

Sport
- Sport: Speed skating

Sylvie Cantin (born 15 March 1970) is a Canadian speed skater. She competed in the women's 1000 metres at the 1998 Winter Olympics.
