= 108th Anti-Aircraft Missile Regiment =

- Active: 1942–2012
- Country: Soviet Union; Ukraine
- Branch: Red Army (Soviet Army from 1946); Ukrainian Ground Forces; Ukrainian Air Defence Forces; Ukrainian Air Force
- Type: Surface-to-air missile unit
- Role: Air defense
- Garrison/HQ: Zolotonosha
- Engagements: World War II
- Decorations: Order of Kutuzov; Order of Bogdan Khmelnitsky
- Battle honours: Zaporizhia

Commanders
- Notable commanders: Igor Danshin

The 108th Anti-Aircraft Missile Regiment (Ukrainian: 108-й зенітний ракетний полк (108 ЗРП); Military Unit Number A4527) was an air defense regiment of the Ukrainian Air Force, based at Zolotonosha until its 2012 disbandment. The regiment began as the 22nd Anti-Aircraft Artillery Division of the Red Army formed during World War II, which was reorganized as a brigade postwar. During much of the Cold War it was the 108th Anti-Aircraft Missile Brigade (Military Unit Number 36836).

== World War II ==
The 22nd Anti-Aircraft Artillery Division of the Reserve of the High Command (RGK) began its formation in the Moscow Military District during December 1942 and on 15 January 1943 Colonel Igor Danshin (promoted to major general 18 November 1944) was appointed commander. The division included the 1335th, 1341st, 1347th, and 1353rd Anti-Aircraft Artillery Regiments. After completing its formation in March, the division was sent to the Southwestern Front, which became the 3rd Ukrainian Front on 20 October of that year. The division supported the 3rd Guards Army and the 8th Guards Army during the Izyum–Barvenkovo offensive, Donbas strategic offensive, Zaporozhye offensive, the Nikopol–Krivoi Rog offensive, and the Bereznegovatoye–Snigirevka offensive from the summer of 1943 to the spring of 1944. The division received the name of Zaporozhye as an honorific on 14 October 1943 in recognition of its performance during the capture of the city. During the fighting on the right bank of the Dniester, the anti-aircraft batteries of the division came under German fighter attack that inflicted significant casualties, in advance of the German counterattack on 3 July during the First Jassy–Kishinev offensive. Due to its losses, the division was temporarily withdrawn from action to rebuild.

During the Second Jassy–Kishinev offensive and in fighting in Bulgaria and Yugoslavia, the division supported the raid of the 4th Guards Mechanized Corps. On 7 September 1944 the 22nd was awarded the Order of Kutuzov, 2nd class for "exemplary fulfillment of command tasks" in breaking through enemy defenses south of Bender and the capture of Kishinev and its "valor and courage". The division, reinforced with tanks and infantry, acted as an assault group during the battle for Belgrade, participating in the capture of the royal palace, parliament building, post and telegraph office, and the military academy. The 22nd supported the raid of the 18th Tank Corps during the Budapest offensive and operated in conjunction with the 5th Guards Tank Army during the Vienna offensive. The division was awarded the Order of Bogdan Khmelnitsky, 2nd class, on 26 April 1945 in recognition of its performance in the capture of Pápa and Devecser. From 1943 to the end of the war, the division was credited with destroying 264 aircraft, up to 3 infantry regiments, capturing up to 10,000 soldiers and officers, knocking out 45 tanks, burning three railway echelons, and suppressing the fire of 15 batteries.

== Postwar ==
After the end of the war, the division became part of the Central Group of Forces. Danshin was transferred to become an academy instructor in August 1945, and was replaced by Colonel Ivan Plachnida. The division was reorganized as the 449th Anti-Aircraft Artillery Brigade in spring 1948 and in June of that year Plachnida transferred to command another anti-aircraft artillery division. He was replaced first by Major General Artyom Makashutin and then by Colonel Pyotr Shulga in December. By December 1948 the brigade was at Akhtyrka in the Kiev Military District. The division was subsequently transferred to the Special Mechanized Army and renumbered as the 98th Anti-Aircraft Artillery Brigade in November 1955. The brigade was expanded into the 86th Anti-Aircraft Artillery Division on 22 August 1956, stationed at Constanța. The Special Mechanized Army became the 1st Separate Army in 1957, and in July 1958 withdrew from Romania to the Kiev Military District. When air defense units were reorganized on 30 July 1960 due to the replacement of anti-aircraft guns by surface-to-air missiles, the division was reorganized as the 108th Anti-Aircraft Missile Brigade of the 1st Separate Army, a unit of the Air Defense of the Ground Forces. The 108th was headquartered at Zolotonosha as the air defense brigade of the army, which became the 1st Guards Army in 1967, for the rest of the Cold War. The brigade had the Military Unit Number 36836. Its 1656th Separate Anti-Aircraft Missile Battalion, formed in 1990, was the highest numbered battalion in the Army. The brigade was equipped with the S-75 Dvina missile system from 1960 to 1970, the 2K11 Krug from 1970, and the Buk-M1 missile system from 1990.

After the Dissolution of the Soviet Union, the brigade became part of the Armed Forces of Ukraine in January 1992 and was transferred to the Ukrainian Air Defense Forces in July 1996, continuing to operate the Buk-M1. The 108th was reduced from a brigade to a regiment at some point between 2000 and 2006. It became part of the Ukrainian Air Force in 2004 when the Air Defence Forces merged into the Air Force. The 108th Anti-Aircraft Missile Regiment was disbanded in 2012, but the planned demolition of its barracks was forestalled by city officials. The barracks were taken over by the 156th Anti-Aircraft Missile Regiment after the latter returned from the war in Donbas in 2014.
