= Ben Hindle =

Canadian bobsledder

Medal record

Bobsleigh

World Championships
Bronze medal – third place	1999 Cortina d'Ampezzo	Four-man

Ben Hindle (born May 23, 1974 in Calgary, Alberta) is a Canadian bobsledder who competed in the 1990s. Hindle won a bronze medal in the four-man event at the 1999 FIBT World Championships in Cortina d'Ampezzo.

Competing in two Winter Olympics, he finished 11th in the four-man event at Nagano in 1998.

Prior to his career in bobsleigh, Hindle also competed in track and field, ranking nationally in the 100 m and 200 m events.

Hindle also appeared as a Russian bobsledder in the 1993 film Cool Runnings.
