= Li Yu (speed skater) =

Chinese speed skater

Li Yu (Chinese: 李雨, born 16 March 1976) is a former Chinese short track speed skater who participated in the 1998, 2002, and 2006 Winter Olympics.
