= Matt Hindle =

Canadian bobsledder

Medal record

Bobsleigh

World Championships
| Bronze medal – third place | 1999 Cortina d'Ampezzo | Four-man |

Matt Hindle (born May 23, 1974 in Calgary, Alberta) is a Canadian bobsledder who competed in the 1990s. Hindle won a bronze medal in the four-man event at the 1999 FIBT World Championships in Cortina d'Ampezzo.

Competing in two Winter Olympics, He finished 11th in the four-man event at Nagano in 1998.

Since 2002, Hindle has been development coach for Bobsleigh Canada Skeleton.
