= Cho Seon-yeon =

South Korean speed skater

Personal information
- Nationality: South Korean
- Born: 29 May 1980 (age 45)

Sport
- Sport: Speed skating

Cho Seon-yeon (born 29 May 1980) is a South Korean speed skater. She competed in two events at the 2002 Winter Olympics.
