= Pat Bouchard =

Canadian speed skater

Personal information
- Born: 24 April 1973 (age 51); Charlesbourg, Quebec, Canada

Sport
- Sport: Speed skating

Pat Bouchard (born 24 April 1973) is a Canadian speed skater. He competed at the 1994 Winter Olympics, the 1998 Winter Olympics and the 2002 Winter Olympics.
