= Dai Dengwen =

Chinese speed skater

Personal information
- Nationality: Chinese
- Born: 15 December 1976 (age 48)

Sport
- Sport: Speed skating

Dai Dengwen (born 15 December 1976) is a Chinese speed skater. He competed in two events at the 1998 Winter Olympics.
