= Linda Johnson-Blair =

Canadian speed skater

Personal information
- Nationality: Canadian
- Born: 20 June 1971 (age 54) Fort St. John, British Columbia, Canada

Sport
- Sport: Speed skating

Linda Johnson-Blair (born 20 June 1971) is a Canadian speed skater. She competed at the 1994 Winter Olympics and the 1998 Winter Olympics.
