= Tatyana Danshina =

Russian speed skater

Personal information
- Nationality: Russian
- Born: 20 June 1975 (age 49); Birobidzhan, Soviet Union

Sport
- Sport: Speed skating

Tatyana Danshina (born 20 June 1975) is a Russian speed skater. She competed in two events at the 1998 Winter Olympics.
