= Catriona Le May Doan =

Canadian speed skater (born 1970)

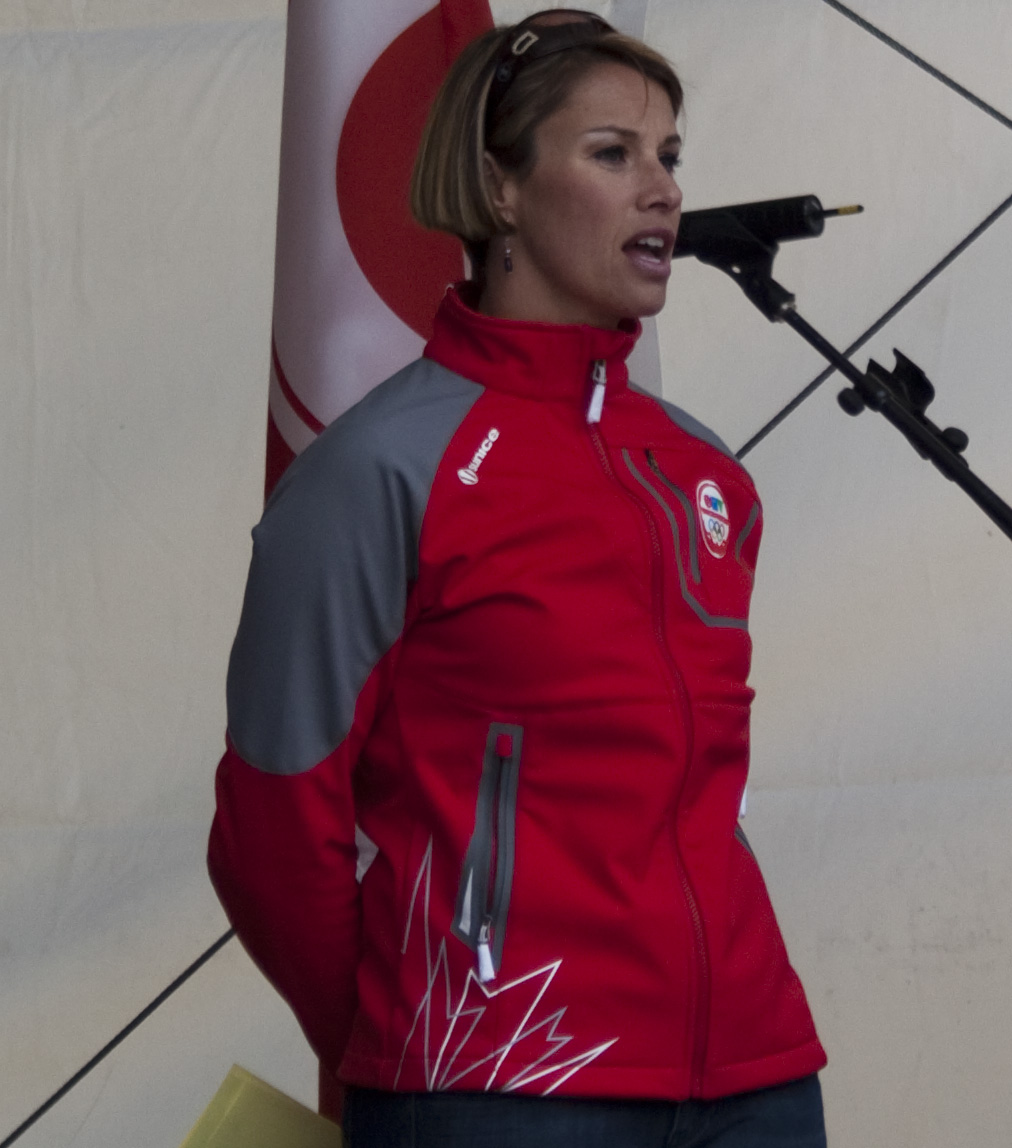
- Le May Doan in 2010 at the Olympic Plaza in Calgary, Alberta

Personal information
- Born: December 23, 1970 (age 55) Saskatoon, Saskatchewan, Canada
- Height: 1.70 m (5 ft 7 in)
- Weight: 70 kg (154 lb; 11 st 0 lb)

Sport
- Country: Canada
- Sport: Speed skating
- Retired: 2003
Medal record
Women's speed skating
Representing Canada
Olympic Games
| Gold medal – first place | 1998 Nagano | 500 m |
| Gold medal – first place | 2002 Salt Lake City | 500 m |
| Bronze medal – third place | 1998 Nagano | 1,000 m |
World Championships
| Gold medal – first place | 1998 Calgary | 500 m |
| Gold medal – first place | 1999 Heerenveen | 500 m |
| Gold medal – first place | 2001 Salt Lake City | 500 m |
| Gold medal – first place | 1998 Berlin | Sprint |
| Gold medal – first place | 2002 Hamar | Sprint |
| Silver medal – second place | 1998 Calgary | 1000 m |
| Silver medal – second place | 1999 Calgary | Sprint |
| Bronze medal – third place | 2000 Nagano | 500 m |
| Bronze medal – third place | 1999 Heerenveen | 1000 m |
| Bronze medal – third place | 2001 Salt Lake City | 1000 m |
| Bronze medal – third place | 2001 Inzell | Sprint |

Catriona Ann Le May Doan (born December 23, 1970) is a retired Canadian speed skater and a double Olympic champion in the 500 m. She served as the chef de mission for Team Canada at the 2022 Winter Olympics in Beijing.

== Career ==
=== Speed skating ===
Born in Saskatoon, Saskatchewan, of Scottish ancestry, Le May Doan won the Olympic 500 m title at the 1998 Winter Olympics in Nagano, Japan. She repeated the feat at the 2002 Winter Olympics in Salt Lake City, Utah, giving rise to the title "the fastest woman on ice". At the Nagano Olympics, she also won a bronze in the 1,000 m. She was World Sprint Champion 1998 and 2002 and World Champion 500 m 1998, 1999, and 2001, and won a 500 m bronze in 2000. She also won the 500 m World Cup 4 times (in 1998, 1999, 2001, and 2003) and the 1,000 m World Cup once (in 1998). She was Canada's flag bearer at the Winter Olympics twice, for the 1998 Nagano Olympics closing ceremony and the opening ceremony of the 2002 Salt Lake City Olympics.

On November 22, 1997, Le May Doan became the first woman to break the 38-second barrier for the 500 m, skating 37.90 s in Calgary, Alberta. Before the year was over, she had tied the record once and broken it twice, ending on 37.55 s. Within the next four years, she broke this record four more times, up to 37.22 s in Calgary, in December 2001. Between 7 January 2001 and 24 February 2001, Le May Doan was the only woman under the 38-second barrier, achieving it 14 times, including the eight times that she lowered the overall record.

- 1. Catriona Le May-Doan CAN 37,40 1 Calgary 06-01-2001
- 2. Catriona Le May-Doan CAN 37,55 1 Calgary 28-12-1997
- 3. Catriona Le May-Doan CAN 37,57 1 Calgary 07-01-2001
- 4. Catriona Le May-Doan CAN 37,71 1 Calgary 27-03-1998
- 5. Catriona Le May-Doan CAN 37,71 1 Calgary 27-12-1997
- 6. Catriona Le May-Doan CAN 37,86 1 Calgary 21-02-1999
- 7. Catriona Le May-Doan CAN 37,88 1 Calgary 27-03-1998
- 8. Catriona Le May-Doan CAN 37,89 1 Calgary 20-02-1999
- 9. Catriona Le May-Doan CAN 37,90 1 Calgary 22-11-1997
- 10. Catriona Le May-Doan CAN 37,90 1 Calgary 23-11-1997
- 11. Catriona Le May-Doan CAN 37,90 1 Calgary 29-11-1998
- 12. Catriona Le May-Doan CAN 37,94 1 Calgary 18-11-2000
- 13. Catriona Le May-Doan CAN 37,97 1 Calgary 12-01-2000
- 14. Catriona Le May-Doan CAN 37,98 1 Calgary 13-02-1999

In the 1994 Winter Olympics, Le May Doan fell on the 500 m and placed 17th on the 1,500 m. Prior to Nagano, she was training with her teammate and rival Susan Auch, both being coached by Susan's brother, Derrick Auch. In 1998, Susan Auch placed second behind Le May Doan on the 500 m. Leading up to the 2002 Salt Lake City Games, Le May Doan was coached by Sean Ireland.

Le May Doan repeated her gold medal in the 500m at the 2002 Salt Lake City Olympics. She became the first Canadian to defend their gold medal at the Olympics.

=== After speedskating ===
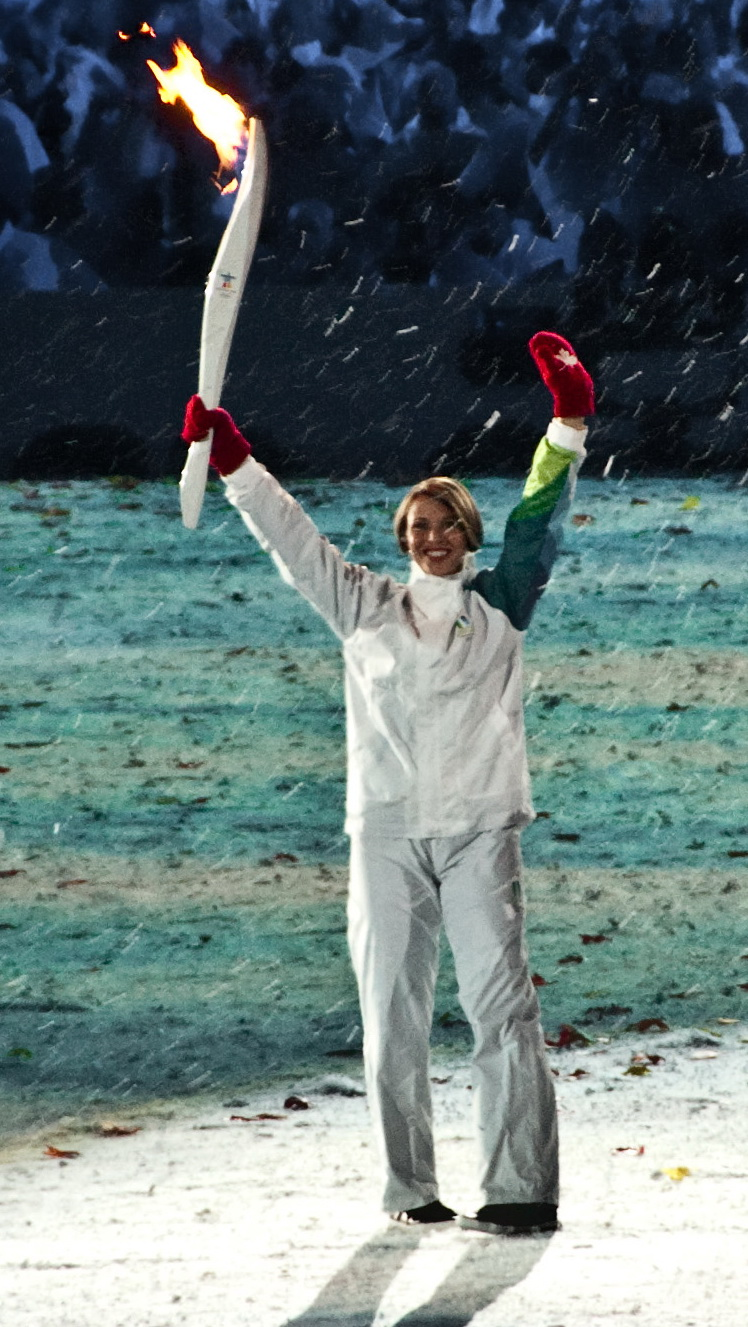
Le May Doan carrying the Olympic flame at the opening ceremonies of the 2010 Winter Olympics

Le May Doan retired from competitive skating in 2003. She was a commentator for the Canadian Broadcasting Corporation during the 2004 Summer Olympics in Athens and was a member of the official Canadian contingent when Vancouver was chosen as the site of the 2010 Winter Olympics. She is a popular motivational speaker, and has been involved with Campus Crusade for Christ's Power to Change campaign.

In 2005, Le May Doan was made an Officer of the Order of Canada, and inducted into the Canadian Sports Hall of Fame.

Le May Doan provided colour commentary for the CBC during the 2006 Winter Olympics for speed skating. She was inducted into the Canadian Olympic Hall of Fame in 2008 and was also a colour commentator for CTV at the 2010 Winter Olympics in Vancouver. She was one of four torchbearers selected to light the interior cauldron in BC Place at the opening ceremonies for the 2010 Winter Olympics. She was subsequently left out of the lighting when one of the arms to light the cauldron failed to rise due to mechanical problems. This was remediated as part of the opening segment of the closing ceremonies when she lit the fourth arm of the cauldron.

In November 2020, it was announced that Le May Doan would be the chef de mission for Team Canada at the 2022 Winter Olympics in Beijing.

In June 2023, Le May Doan was appointed Honorary Consul of the Kingdom of the Netherlands in Calgary.

== Personal life ==
Le May Doan was married to Bart Doan. They separated in 2017. She has two children, Greta and Easton.

In 2002, Le May Doan published an autobiography, Going for Gold.

== Achievements ==
- 1996
  - Gold- 1996 World Sprint Championship, 500 m, Heerenveen, Netherlands
- 1997
  - First Overall- 1997/98 World Cup Standings 500 m
  - Gold- 1997 World Cup, 500 m, Roseville, Minnesota
  - Silver- 1997 World Cup, 500 m, Roseville, Minnesota
  - Gold- 1997 World Cup, 1000 m, Roseville, Minnesota
  - Gold- 1997 World Cup, 500 m, Calgary, Alberta
  - Gold- 1997 World Cup, 500 m, Calgary, Alberta
  - Gold- 1997 World Cup, 1000 m, Calgary, Alberta
  - Silver- 1997 World Cup, 1000 m, Calgary, Alberta
  - Gold- 1996/97 Canadian Sprint Championship, Overall
  - Silver- 1997 World Sprint Championship, 500m, Hamar, Norway
  - Bronze- 1997 World Cup, 500 m, Innsbruck, Austria
- 1998
  - Gold- 1998/99 World Cup, 500 m, Seoul, Korea
  - Gold- 1998/99 World Cup, 500 m, Nagano, Japan
  - Gold- 1998/99 World Cup, 1000 m, Nagano, Japan
  - Gold- 1998 Winter Olympic Games, 500 m, Nagano, Japan
  - Bronze- 1998 Winter Olympic Games, 1000 m, Nagano, Japan
  - Olympic Record- 1998 Winter Olympic Games 500 m (38.21 s)
  - 1998- Canadian Female Athlete of the Year
  - First Overall- 1998 World Cup Standings 500 m
  - First Overall- 1998 World Cup Standings 1000 m
  - Gold- 1998 World Single Distance Championships, 500 m, Calgary
  - Silver- 1998 World Single Distance Championships, 1000 m, Calgary
  - Gold- 1998 World Cup, 500 m, West Allis, Wisconsin
  - Gold- 1998 World Cup, 500 m, West Allis, Wisconsin
  - World Record- 1998 Canadian Olympic Trials 500 m (37.55 s)
  - World Champion- 1998 World Sprint Championship, Berlin, Germany
  - Gold- 1998 World Cup, 500 m, Baselga di Pine, Italy
  - Gold- 1998 World Cup, 500 m, Baselga di Pine, Italy
  - Silver- 1998 World Cup, 1000 m, Baselga di Pine, Italy
- 1999
  - Gold- 1999 World Single Distance Championships, 500 m, Heerenveen, Netherlands
  - Bronze- 1999 World Single Distance Championships, 1000 m, Heerenveen, Netherlands
  - First Overall- 1999 World Cup Standings, 500 m
  - Third Overall- 1999 World Cup Standings, 1000 m
  - World Champion- 1999 World Sprint Championships, 500 m, Calgary
  - Gold- 1999 World Cup, 500 m, Berlin, Germany
- 2000
  - Gold- 2000/01 World Cup, 500 m, Nagano, Japan
  - Gold- 2000/01 World Cup, 500 m, Seoul, Korea
  - Bronze- 2000 World Single Distance Championships, 500 m, Nagano, Japan
  - Silver- 2000 World Cup, 500 m, Calgary
  - Silver- 2000 World Cup, 500 m, Butte, Montana
  - Silver- 2000 World Cup, 1000 m, Butte, Montana
  - First Overall- 2000 Canadian Sprint Championships
- 2001
  - 2001- Canadian Female Athlete of the Year
  - World Record- 2001 World Single Distance Championships 500 m (37.29 s)
  - First Overall- 2001 World Cup Standings, 500 m
  - World Record- 2001 Canadian National Championships 500 m (37.40 s)
  - World Record- 2001 Canadian National Championships Overall: Points (150.085)
  - Gold- 2001 World Single Distance Championships, 500 m, Salt Lake City, Utah
  - Bronze- 2001 World Single Distance Championships, 1000 m, Salt Lake City, Utah
  - World Champion- 2001 World Sprint Championships, 500 m, Inzell, Germany
  - First Overall- 2001 Canadian Sprint Championships
  - Gold- 2001 World Cup, 1000 m, Calgary
  - Gold- 2001 World Cup, 500 m, Calgary
  - Gold- 2001 World Cup, 500 m, Heerenveen, Netherlands
  - Gold- 2001 World Cup, 1000 m Heerenveen, Netherlands
  - Gold- 2001 World Cup, 500 m, Helsinki, Finland
  - Silver- 2001/02 World Cup, 1000 m, Calgary
  - Gold- 2001/02 World Cup, 500 m, Salt Lake City, Utah
- 2002
  - Gold- 2002 Winter Olympic Games, 500 m, Salt Lake City, Utah
  - Olympic Record- 2002 Winter Olympic Games, 500 m (37.30 s), Salt Lake City, Utah
  - World Champion- 2002 World Sprint Championships, 500 m, Hamar, Norway
  - 2002- Lou Marsh Award as Canada's Athlete of the Year
  - 2002- Canadian Female Athlete of the Year
  - World Record- 2001/02 World Cup, 500 m (37.22 s) Calgary
  - First Overall- 2002 World Cup Standings 500 m
  - Gold- 2002 World Cup, 500 m, Inzell, Germany
  - Gold- 2002 World Cup, 100 m, Inzell, Germany
  - Gold- 2002 World Cup, 500 m, Heerenveen, Netherlands
  - Gold- 2001/02 World Cup, 500 m, Calgary

=== Personal records ===
| Distance | Result | Location | Date |
|---|---|---|---|
| 500 m | 37.22 | Calgary | 9 December 2001 |
| 1,000 m | 1:14.50 | Salt Lake City | 10 March 2001 |
| 1,500 m | 1:57.50 | Calgary | 16 March 2001 |
| 3,000 m | 4:26.98 | Calgary | 21 March 2003 |
| 5,000 m | 8:14.52 | Calgary | 19 December 1993 |

Olympic Games
| Preceded by Li Ning | Final Olympic torchbearer Vancouver 2010; With: Steve Nash, Nancy Greene, and Wayne Gretzky | Succeeded by Callum Airlie, Jordan Duckitt, Desiree Henry, Katie Kirk, Cameron MacRitchie, Aidan Reynolds, and Adelle Tracey |
| Preceded by Stefania Belmondo | Final Winter Olympic torchbearer Vancouver 2010; With: Steve Nash, Nancy Greene, and Wayne Gretzky | Succeeded by Irina Rodnina and Vladislav Tretiak |
