= Li Xuesong =

Chinese speed skater

Personal information
- Nationality: Chinese
- Born: 21 December 1979 (age 46) Changchun, China

Sport
- Sport: Speed skating

Li Xuesong (born 21 December 1979) is a Chinese speed skater. She competed in two events at the 1998 Winter Olympics.
