= Yang Chunyuan =

Chinese speed skater

Yang Chunyuan 杨春援
Personal information
- Nationality: Chinese
- Born: 20 August 1973 (age 53) Suihua, China

Sport
- Sport: Speed skating

Yang Chunyuan (born 20 August 1973) is a Chinese speed skater. She competed at the 1994, 1998 and the 2002 Winter Olympics.
