= List of flag bearers for Denmark at the Olympics =

Denmark at the Olympics
- IOC code: DEN
- NOC: National Olympic Committee and Sports Confederation of Denmark
- Website: www.dif.dk (in Danish and English)
- Medals: Gold 50 Silver 82 Bronze 84 Total 216

Summer appearances
- 1896; 1900; 1904; 1908; 1912; 1920; 1924; 1928; 1932; 1936; 1948; 1952; 1956; 1960; 1964; 1968; 1972; 1976; 1980; 1984; 1988; 1992; 1996; 2000; 2004; 2008; 2012; 2016; 2020; 2024

Winter appearances
- 1948; 1952; 1956; 1960; 1964; 1968; 1972–1984; 1988; 1992; 1994; 1998; 2002; 2006; 2010; 2014; 2018; 2022; 2026

Other related appearances
- 1906 Intercalated Games

This is a list of flag bearers who have represented Denmark at the Olympics.

Flag bearers carry the national flag of their country at the opening ceremony of the Olympic Games.

#	Event year	Season	Flag bearer	Sport	Ref.
1	1906	Summer	Rudolf Andreas Kraft	Official	
2	1908	Summer	Aage Holm	Swimming	
3	1912	Summer	Arne Højme	Race walking (did not compete)	
4	1920	Summer	Robert Johnsen	Gymnastics	
5	1924	Summer	Peter Ryefelt	Fencing	
6	1928	Summer	Marius Jørgensen	Athletics	
7	1932	Summer	Axel Bloch	Fencing	
8	1936	Summer	Erik Hammer Sørensen	Fencing	
9	1948	Winter	Knud Tønsberg	Official	
10	1948	Summer	Vagn Loft	Field hockey	
11	1952	Winter	Per Cock-Clausen	Figure skating	
12	1952	Summer	Erik Swane Lund	Fencing	
13	1956	Summer	Ole Hviid Jensen	Shooting	
–	1960	Winter	Denmark's only athlete marched with the Norwegian team		
14	1960	Summer	Benny Schmidt	Modern pentathlon	
15	1964	Winter	Svend Carlsen	Cross-country skiing	
16	1964	Summer	Henning Wind	Sailing	
17	1968	Winter	Kirsten Carlsen	Cross-country skiing	
18	1968	Summer	Erik Hansen	Canoeing	
19	1972	Summer	Peder Pedersen	Cycling	
20	1976	Summer	Judith Andersen	Rowing	
21	1980	Summer	Jørgen Lindhardsen	Sailing	
22	1984	Summer	Michael Markussen	Cycling	
23	1988	Winter	Lars Dresler	Figure skating	
24	1988	Summer	Anne Grethe Jensen-Törnblad	Equestrian	
25	1992	Winter	Ebbe Hartz	Cross-country skiing	
26	1992	Summer	Jørgen Bojsen-Møller	Sailing	
27	1994	Winter	Michael Tyllesen	Figure skating	
28	1996	Summer	Thomas Stuer-Lauridsen	Badminton	
29	1998	Winter	Helena Blach Lavrsen	Curling	
30	2000	Summer	Jesper Bank	Sailing	
31	2002	Winter	Ulrik Schmidt	Curling	
32	2004	Summer	Eskild Ebbesen	Rowing	
33	2006	Winter	Dorthe Holm	Curling	
34	2008	Summer	Joachim B. Olsen	Athletics	
35	2010	Winter	Sophie Fjellvang-Sølling	Freestyle skiing	
36	2012	Summer	Kim Wraae Knudsen	Canoeing	
37	2014	Winter	Lene Nielsen	Curling	
38	2016	Summer	Caroline Wozniacki	Tennis	
39	2018	Winter	Elena Møller Rigas	Speed skating	
40	2020	Summer	Sara Slott Petersen	Athletics	
41	2020	Summer	Jonas Warrer	Sailing	
42	2022	Winter	Madeleine Dupont	Curling	
43	2022	Winter	Frans Nielsen	Ice hockey	
44	2024	Summer	Niklas Landin Jacobsen	Handball	
45	2024	Summer	Anne-Marie Rindom	Sailing	

== See also ==
- Denmark at the Olympics
