= Piruetten =

Figure skating competition

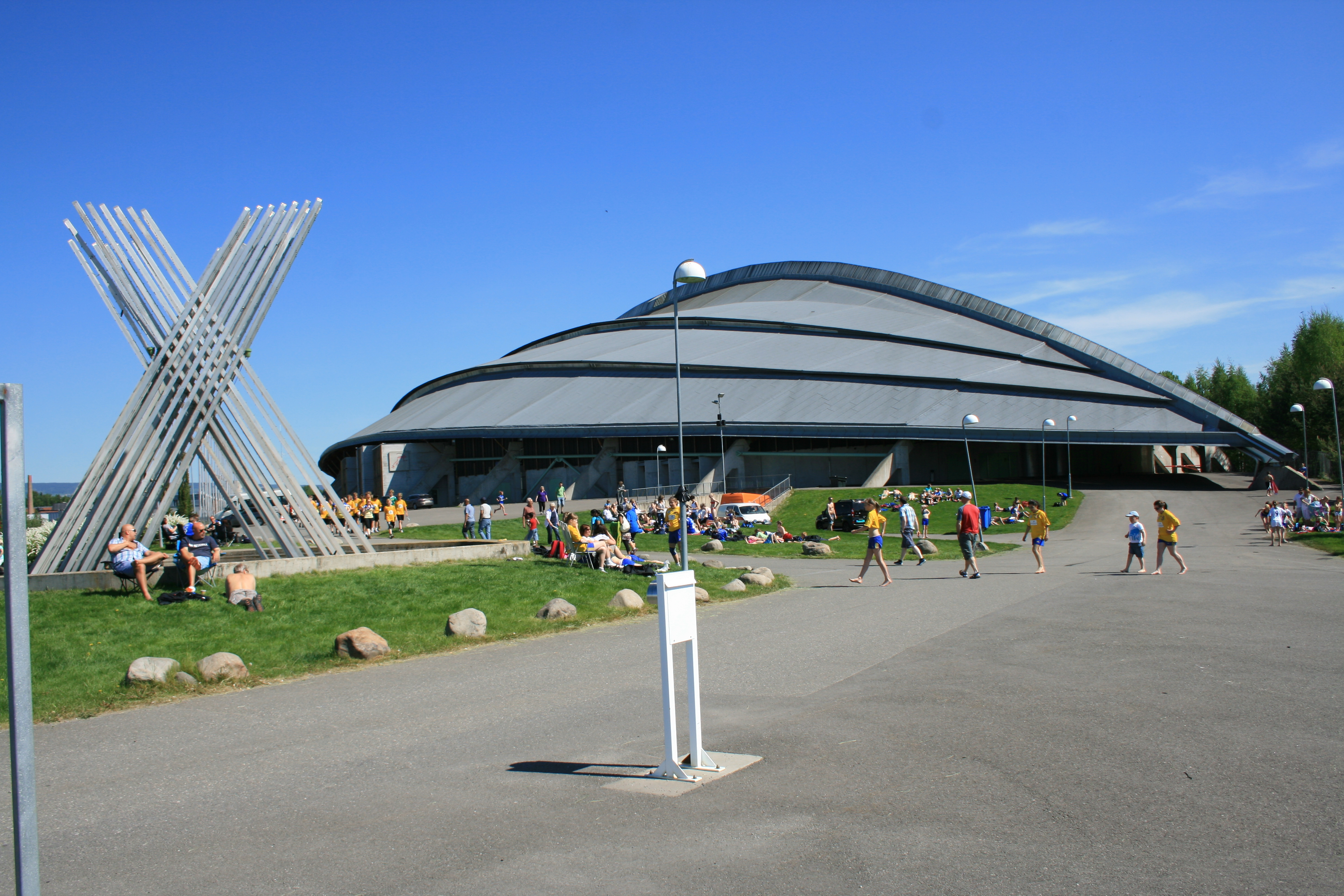
The Hamar Olympic Hall in Hamar, Norway, hosted the 1993 Piruetten in advance of the 1994 Winter Olympics.

Piruetten was a senior international figure skating competition held first in Trondheim, Norway (1984–1986) then in Oslo, Norway (1987–) then later in Hamar, Norway. Medals were awarded in men's singles, ladies' singles, and ice dance. The 1993 Piruetten was the test event for the 1994 Winter Olympics.

== Senior medalists ==
=== Men's singles ===
Men's event medalists
Year	Location	Gold	Silver	Bronze	Ref.
1984		(Austria) Thomas Hlavik	No other competitors		
1985		(Italy) Alessandro Riccitelli	(Austria) Thomas Hlavik	(Sweden) Emanuele Ancorini	
1986		(United Kingdom) David Reynolds	(Austria) Andreas Waldeck	No other competitors	
1987		(France) Nicolas Pétorin	(France) Éric Millot	(Denmark) Henrik Walentin	
1988		(Finland) Oula Jääskeläinen	(France) Sebastian Deborde	(Finland) Jari Kauppi	
1989		(Soviet Union) Sergei Dudakov	(France) Alexander Orset	(Norway) Jan Erik Digernes	
1990	Oslo	(Soviet Union) Sergei Dudakov	(United States) Shepherd Clark	(Soviet Union) Sergei Artemov	
1991	Lillehammer	(United States) Scott Davis	(Chinese Taipei) David Liu	(France) Frédéric Lebihan	
1992	Lillehammer	(United States) Michael Chack	(Finland) Oula Jääskeläinen	(United Kingdom) Clive Shorten	
1993	Hamar	(Canada) Elvis Stojko	(France) Philippe Candeloro	(United States) Scott Davis	
1995		(France) Thierry Cerez	(Russia) Igor Sinyutin	(Poland) Robert Grzegorczyk	
1996	Hamar	(Denmark) Michael Tyllesen	(Denmark) Johnny Rønne Jensen	(United States) Trifun Živanović	
1997	Hamar	(United States) Michael Chack	(Estonia) Margus Hernits	(United States) Jere Michael	
1998	Hamar	(Denmark) Michael Tyllesen	(Australia) Michael Amentas	(Estonia) Alexei Kozlov	

=== Women's singles ===
Women's event medalists
Year	Location	Gold	Silver	Bronze	Ref.
1984		(Sweden) Susanne Seger	(Sweden) Maria Bergquist	(Germany) Maria Geier-Haylock	
1985		(Belgium) Katrien Pauwels	(Austria) Sabine Paal	(United Kingdom) Jayne Taylor	
1986		(United Kingdom) Louise Wooster	(Netherlands) Astrid Winkelmann	(Denmark) Connie Sjøholm Jørgensen	
1987		(Belgium) Katrien Pauwels	(Sweden) Maria Bergquist	(United Kingdom) Louisa Danskin	
1988		(West Germany) Nicole Neujahr	(Austria) Susanne Reindel	(Sweden) Maria Bergquist	
1989		(France) Stéphanie Ferrer	(Soviet Union) Natalia Skrabnevskaya	(Japan) Misachi Kashiwagi	
1990	Oslo	(Soviet Union) Maria Butyrskaya	(United Kingdom) Gina Fulton	(Finland) Mari Niskanen	
1991	Lillehammer	(Canada) Lisa Sargeant	(United States) Kyoko Ina	(South Korea) Lily Lyoonjung Lee	
1992	Lillehammer	(United States) Michelle Cho	(Finland) Mila Kajas	(Sweden) Ann-Marie Soderholm	
1993	Hamar	(United States) Nancy Kerrigan	(Canada) Josée Chouinard	(China) Chen Lu	
1995		(Canada) Cathy Belanger	(Finland) Mila Kajas	(United Kingdom) Stephanie Main	
1996	Hamar	(United States) Brittney McConn	(Finland) Alisa Drei	(Poland) Anna Rechnio	
1997	Hamar	(United States) Tonia Kwiatkowski	(United States) Erin Sutton	(Germany) Christina Riedel	
1998	Hamar	(Australia) Joanne Carter	(Finland) Annukka Laukkanen	(Canada) Annie Bazinet	

=== Pairs ===
Pairs event medalists
Year	Location	Gold	Silver	Bronze	Ref.
1992	Lillehammer	(Germany); Mandy Wötzel; Ingo Steuer	(Latvia); Elena Berezhnaya; Oļegs Šļahovs	(Australia); Danielle Carr; Stephen Carr	
1993	Hamar	(Russia); Natalia Mishkutionok; Artur Dmitriev	(Canada); Isabelle Brasseur; Lloyd Eisler	(United States); Kyoko Ina; Jason Dungjen	

=== Ice dance ===
Ice dance event medalists
Year	Location	Gold	Silver	Bronze	Ref.
1992	Lillehammer	(Finland); Susanna Rahkamo; Petri Kokko	(Uzbekistan); Aliki Stergiadu; Juris Razgulajevs	(France); Marina Morel; Gwendal Peizerat	
1993	Hamar	(Finland); Susanna Rahkamo; Petri Kokko	(Czech Republic); Kateřina Mrázová; Martin Šimeček	(Russia); Elena Kustarova; Oleg Ovsyannikov	

== Junior medalists ==
=== Men's singles ===
Junior men's event medalists
Year	Location	Gold	Silver	Bronze	Ref.
1984		(United Kingdom) Mark Perry	No other competitors		
1985		(United Kingdom) Mark Perry	(Norway) Jan Erik Digernes	No other competitors	
1986		(Sweden) Emanuele Ancorini	(Norway) Jan Erik Digernes	(Sweden) Fredrik Rosén	
1987		(France) Sebastian Deborde	(Denmark) Michael Tyllesen	(Sweden) Niclas Karlsson	
1988		(Italy) Massimo Salvadè	(Sweden) Niclas Karlsson	(West Germany) Eran Sragowicz	
1989		(Canada) Lance Vipond	(France) Fabrice Garattoni	(Soviet Union) Alexander Abt	
1990	Oslo	(Soviet Union) Ilia Kulik	(Soviet Union) Alexandr Klimkin	(France) Richard Leroy	
1991	Lillehammer	(Soviet Union) Alexander Abt	(Japan) Shin Amano	(United States) Philip Dulebohn	
1992	No junior-level competitions				
1993	No junior-level competitions				
1995		(France) Stephane Bouxirot	(Austria) Markus Haider	(France) Fabien Millasseau	
1996	Hamar	(United States) Justin Dillon	(United States) Braden Overett	(France) Nicolas Beaudelin	
1997	Hamar	(Germany) Sascha Lorenz	(Finland) Edvard Pyöriäinen	(France) Maxime Duchemin	
1998	Hamar	(Germany) Alexander Wolf	(Germany) Sascha Lorenz	(Denmark) Tem Lyllof	
For results after 1998, see ISU Junior Grand Prix in Norway

=== Women's singles ===
Junior women's event medalists
Year	Location	Gold	Silver	Bronze	Ref.
1984		(Sweden) Leena Mattinen	(United Kingdom) Jayne Taylor	(Sweden) Jennie Olander	
1985		(Australia) Popi Geros	(Norway) Anita Thorenfeldt	(United Kingdom) Tracy O'Connor	
1986		(United Kingdom) Helen Fisher	(Sweden) Petra Ekdahl	(Sweden) Cecilia Willberg	
1987		(Belgium) Sandy Suy	(Denmark) Charlotte Petersen	(Netherlands) Marion Krijgsman	
1988		(Sweden) Cecilia Willberg	(Finland) Miia Pulkkinen	(Sweden) Anna-Lena Andersson	
1989		(France) Marie-Pierre Leray	(Canada) Danielle Brunelle	(Soviet Union) Julia Vorobieva	
1990	Oslo	(Poland) Anna Rechnio	(France) Sarah Abitbol	(United Kingdom) Stephanie Walker	
1991	Lillehammer	(Japan) Yukiko Kawasaki	(Soviet Union) Irina Malioutina	(United Kingdom) Stephanie Main	
1992	No junior-level competitions				
1993	No junior-level competitions				
1995		(Finland) Sanna-Maija Wiksten	(Finland) Elina Kettunen	(France) Julie Marques	
1996	Hamar	(United States) Serena Phillips	(Norway) Kaja Hanevold	(Germany) Caroline Gülke	
1997	Hamar	(Finland) Sara Lindroos	(France) Sophie Favrichon	(Finland) Marjut Turunen	
1998	Hamar	(Finland) Susanna Pöykiö	(Finland) Kati Simola	(Germany) Susanne Peters	
For results after 1998, see ISU Junior Grand Prix in Norway
