= Denmark at the 1992 Winter Olympics =

- IOC code: DEN
- NOC: National Olympic Committee and Sports Confederation of Denmark
- Website: www.dif.dk (in Danish and English)

in Albertville
- Competitors: 6 (4 men, 2 women) in 3 sports
- Flag bearer: Ebbe Hartz (cross-country skiing)
- Medals: Gold 0 Silver 0 Bronze 0 Total 0

Winter Olympics appearances (overview)
- 1948; 1952; 1956; 1960; 1964; 1968; 1972–1984; 1988; 1992; 1994; 1998; 2002; 2006; 2010; 2014; 2018; 2022; 2026

Denmark competed at the 1992 Winter Olympics in Albertville, France.

== Competitors ==
The following is the list of number of competitors in the Games.

Sport	Men	Women	Total
Alpine skiing	1	1	2
Cross-country skiing	2	0	2
Figure skating	1	1	2
Total	4	2	6

== Alpine skiing ==
Men

Athlete	Event	Race 1	Race 2	Total	
Athlete	Event	Time	Time	Time	Rank
Nils Gelbjerg-Hansen	Giant Slalom	1:14.04	1:12.45	2:26.49	45
Nils Gelbjerg-Hansen	Slalom	DNF	–	DNF	–

Women

Athlete	Event	Race 1	Race 2	Total	
Athlete	Event	Time	Time	Time	Rank
Tine Kongsholm	Giant Slalom	1:13.82	1:17.18	2:31.00	31
Tine Kongsholm	Slalom	56.01	48.02	1:44.03	28

== Cross-country skiing ==
Men

Event	Athlete	Race	
Event	Athlete	Time	Rank
10 km C	Michael Binzer	32:45.9	69
10 km C	Ebbe Hartz	31:34.5	48
15 km pursuit^{1} F	Michael Binzer	46:12.2	59
15 km pursuit^{1} F	Ebbe Hartz	45:47.6	53
30 km C	Michael Binzer	1'35:00.1	64
30 km C	Ebbe Hartz	1'33:46.4	58
50 km F	Ebbe Hartz	2'21:23.1	49

^{1} Starting delay based on 10 km results.
C = Classical style, F = Freestyle

== Figure skating ==
Men

Athlete	SP	FS	TFP	Rank
Henrik Walentin	24	20	32.0	22

Women

Athlete	SP	FS	TFP	Rank
Anisette Torp-Lind	8	16	20.0	15
