= Denmark at the 1994 Winter Olympics =

- IOC code: DEN
- NOC: National Olympic Committee and Sports Confederation of Denmark
- Website: www.dif.dk (in Danish and English)

in Lillehammer
- Competitors: 4 in 3 sports
- Flag bearer: Michael Tyllesen
- Medals: Gold 0 Silver 0 Bronze 0 Total 0

Winter Olympics appearances (overview)
- 1948; 1952; 1956; 1960; 1964; 1968; 1972–1984; 1988; 1992; 1994; 1998; 2002; 2006; 2010; 2014; 2018; 2022; 2026

Denmark competed at the 1994 Winter Olympics in Lillehammer, Norway.

== Competitors ==
The following is the list of number of competitors in the Games.

Sport	Men	Women	Total
Alpine skiing	1	0	1
Cross-country skiing	2	0	2
Figure skating	1	0	1
Total	4	0	4

== Alpine skiing ==
Men

Athlete	Event	Final				
Athlete	Event	Run 1	Run 2	Run 3	Total	Rank
Johnny Albertsen	Giant Slalom	1:37.35	DNF		DNF	

== Cross-country skiing ==
Men

Athlete	Event	Final					
Athlete	Event	Start	Rank	Time	Rank	Total	Rank
Michael Binzer	10 km Classical					27:43.5	66
Michael Binzer	15 km Free Pursuit	+03:23	66	39:34.1	49	+7:08.3	50
Michael Binzer	30 km Free					1:22:23.1	47
Ebbe Hartz	10 km Classical					27:36.0	64
Ebbe Hartz	15 km Free Pursuit	+03:16	64	41:16.8	63	+8:44.0	61
Ebbe Hartz	30 km Free					1:27:43.2	66
Ebbe Hartz	50 km Classical					2:25:58.5	57

== Figure skating ==
Men

Athlete	Final				
Athlete	Short Program	Rank	Free Skating	Total	Rank
Michael Tyllesen	6.5	13	12.0	18.5	13
