= Justus Strid =

Danish figure skater

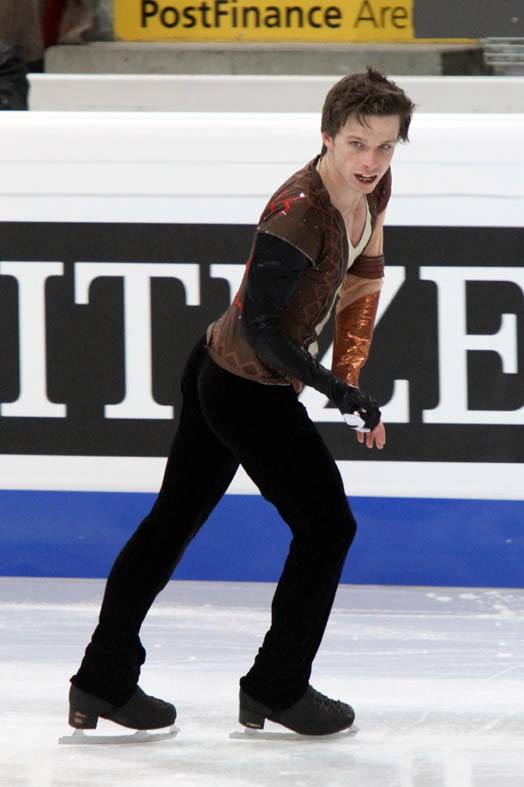
- Strid in 2011

Personal information
- Born: 29 April 1987 (age 39) Gothenburg, Sweden
- Home town: Copenhagen, Denmark
- Height: 1.71 m (5 ft 7 1/2 in)

Figure skating career
- Country: Denmark
- Skating club: Copenhagen SC
- Began skating: 1990
- Retired: April 18, 2015

Justus Strid (born 29 April 1987) is a Danish retired figure skater. He is the 2012 Golden Spin of Zagreb bronze medalist, a three-time Nordic silver medalist, and a seven-time Danish national champion.

== Career ==
Strid originally competed for Sweden. In 2004, he moved to Hørsholm, Denmark, to be coached by Henrik Walentin and Julia Sandstrom. He himself began working as a coach at about the same time, teaching skating to children. He later changed coaches, deciding to work with his brother, Kalle Strid, and Martin Johansson. He lives in the center of Copenhagen and trains in Skatingclub Copenhagen (SKK).

Strid began skating for Denmark in the 2007–08 season. This was after the Danish skating federation asked him to represent them. He won his first national title that season. He debuted at the European and World Championships in 2011. He did not qualify for the free skate at either event.

Strid reached the free skate at the 2012 European Championships in Sheffield, England, where he finished 20th. He was also successful at the 2013 European Championships in Zagreb, Croatia and 2013 World Championships in London, Ontario, Canada.

On April 18, 2015, Strid announced his retirement from competitive figure skating.

== Programs ==
Season	Short program	Free skating
2014–2015	Mack the Knife performed by Robbie Williams	Kristina fran Duvemala by Benny Andersson, Björn Ulvaeus
2013–2014	Pinball Cha Cha by Senor Coconut	Les Misérables by Claude-Michel Schönberg
2012–2013	Pinball Cha Cha by Senor Coconut	Where Do I Fit In by Nicola Piovani
2011–2012	La Vie en rose performed by Michael Bublé choreo. by Kalle Strid, Johnny Jensen	Les Misérables by Claude-Michel Schönberg choreo. by Kalle Strid
2010–2011	La Vie en rose performed by Michael Bublé choreo. by Kalle Strid, Johnny Jensen	Prince of Persia: The Sands of Time by Harry Gregson-Williams; Pirates of the Caribbean by Klaus Badelt, Hans Zimmer

== Results ==
CS: Challenger Series; JGP: Junior Grand Prix

International
Event	02–03	03–04	04–05	05–06	06–07	07–08	08–09	09–10	10–11	11–12	12–13	13–14	14–15
Worlds									32nd	30th	24th	31st	
Europeans									28th	20th	21st	31st	19th
CS Finlandia													7th
CS Ice Challenge													7th
Challenge Cup								16th			6th		5th
Cup of Nice					13th		13th	18th	16th		18th		11th
DS Cup													2nd
Dragon Trophy												2nd	
Finlandia					9th								
Golden Spin											3rd		
Ice Challenge								16th			9th	4th	
Mont Blanc										4th			
Nebelhorn							21st					13th	
Seibt Memorial											5th		
Nordics					6th		3rd		7th	2nd	2nd	2nd	
Ondrej Nepela							20th		6th	14th	9th	8th	
Slovenia Open												4th	
Universiade					27th								
Warsaw Cup												5th	
International: Junior
JGP Bulgaria				21st									
Copenhagen		9th J	3rd J										
Gardena				4th J									
Montfort Cup				2nd J									
Nordics		4th J	2nd J	3rd J									
Warsaw Cup				3rd J									
National
Denmark						1st	1st	1st	1st	1st	1st	1st	
Sweden	5th J	2nd J	2nd J	2nd J	3rd								
J = Junior level
