= Danish Figure Skating Championships =

Recurring national figure skating competition

- Status: Active
- Genre: National championships
- Frequency: Annual
- Country: Denmark
- Inaugurated: 1912
- Organizer: Danish Skating Union

The Danish Figure Skating Championships (Danish: Danske mesterskaber i kunstskøjteløb) are an annual figure skating competition organized by the Danish Skating Union (Danish: Dansk Skøjte Union) to crown the national champions of Denmark. The first Danish Championships were held in 1912 in Copenhagen. Early competitions featured events in single skating, pair skating, and speed skating, and were sporadic for the first several decades, since the mild winters did not provide suitable ice surfaces for competitive skating. The construction of indoor ice rinks in the late 1950s allowed for more permanence and stability in training, and since 1960, the Danish Championships have only been interrupted once: in 2021 due to the COVID-19 pandemic.

Medals are awarded in men's singles, women's singles, and ice dance at the senior and junior levels, although each discipline may not necessarily be held every year due to a lack of participants. There has not been competition in pair skating in Denmark since 1965. Per Cock-Clausen holds the record for winning the most Danish Championship titles in men's singles (with thirteen). Cock-Clausen was 51 years old when he won his last championship title in 1963. Anisette Torp-Lind holds the record in women's singles (with seven). Ayoe Bardram and Alf Refer hold the record in pair skating (with six), although Refer won an additional three titles with other partners. Refer was 54 years old when he won his last championship title in 1965. Vivi Poulsen and Kurt Poulsen hold the record in ice dance (with six).

== History ==
The first Danish Championships were held in January 1912 in Copenhagen, and the Danish Skating Union was established in December 1912 as a federation of three Copenhagen skating clubs. Early competitions featured events in single skating, pair skating, and speed skating, and were sporadic for the first several decades. Only five championships were held between 1912 and 1939, since mild winters did not provide suitable ice surfaces for competitive skating. No competitions were also held between 1943 and 1945 owing to the German occupation of Denmark during World War II. In 1957, Danish champion Per Cock-Clausen reported: "In Denmark, the winter has been very mild... There were only a couple of days in December [1956] and one or two in March when skating has been possible on the lakes." The first indoor ice rinks in Denmark opened in Esbjerg and Østerbro in 1959; within eight years, eleven rinks in Denmark had been constructed: six on the Jutland peninsula and five in Copenhagen. Indoor ice rinks allowed skating to be practiced year round and the Danish Skating Union hired professional instructors. Ice dance debuted as a championship event in 1964, while pair skating last appeared in 1965. Since 1960, the Danish Championships have only been interrupted one time, when the COVID-19 pandemic forced a cancellation in 2021.

== Senior medalists ==
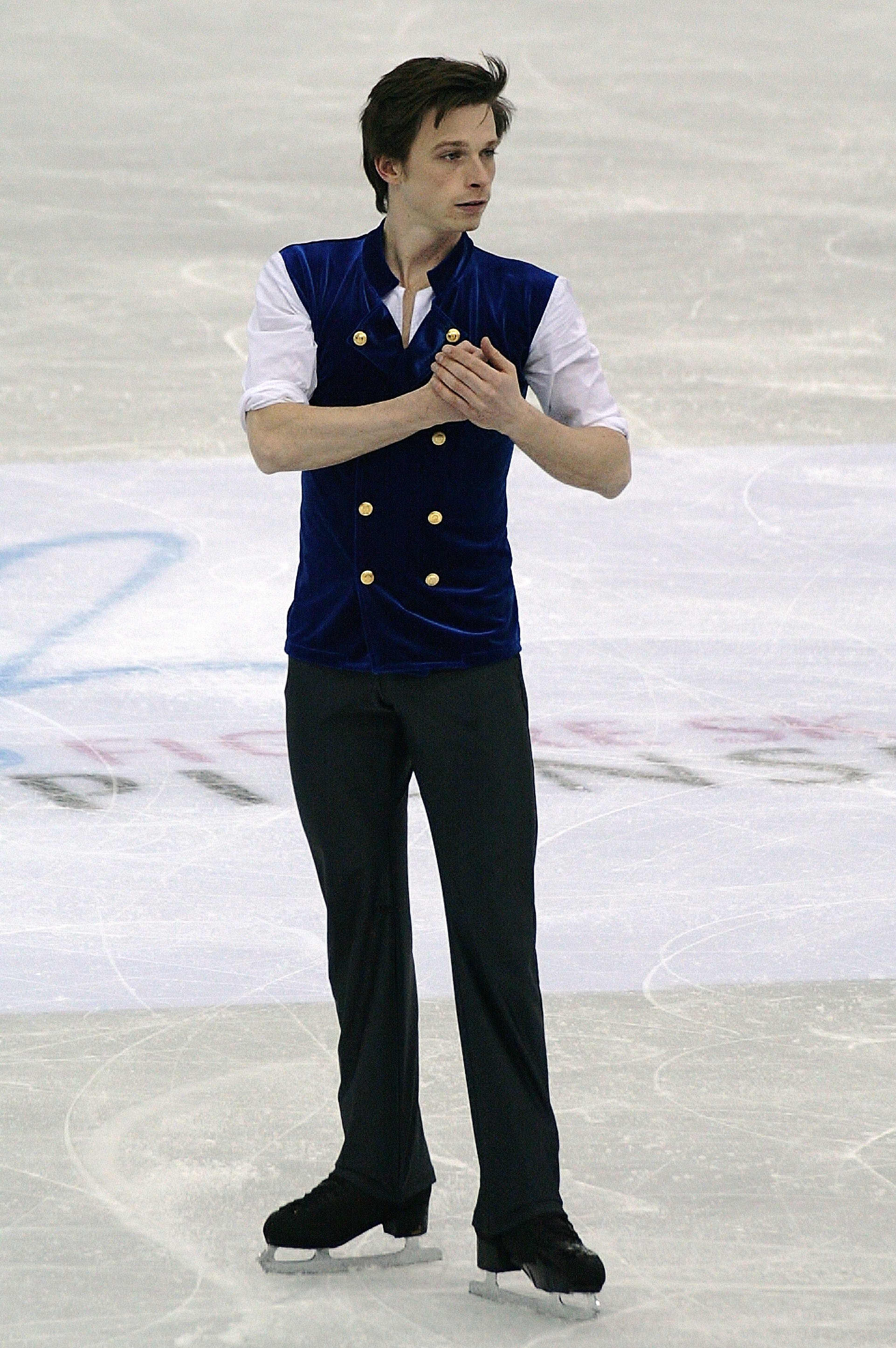
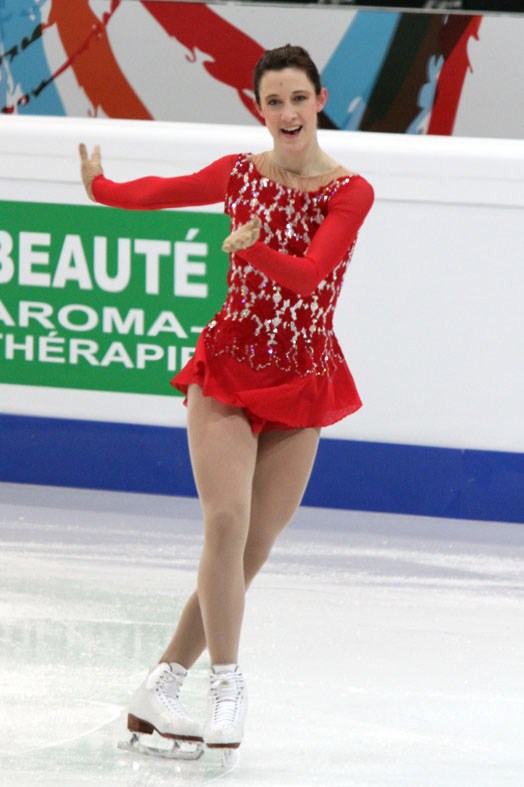
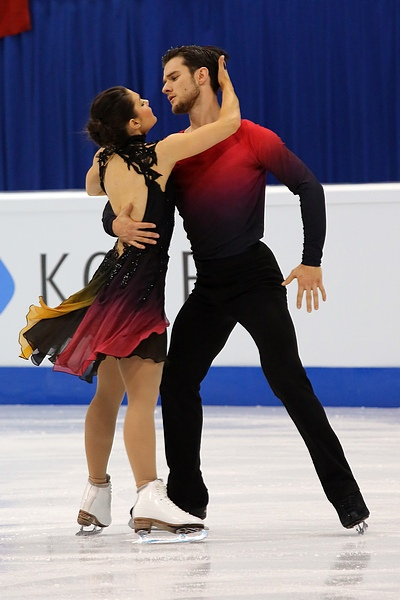
From left to right: Justus Strid, seven-time Danish champion in men's singles; Karina Johnson, four-time Danish champion in women's singles; and Laurence Fournier Beaudry and Nikolaj Sørensen, three-time Danish champions in ice dance

=== Men's singles ===
Men's event medalists
Year	Location	Gold	Silver	Bronze	Ref.
1912	Copenhagen	Henrik Meincke	Holger Thiel	Sciavitsky Dalberg	
1913–16	No competitions held				
1917	Copenhagen	Holger Thiel	Peter Sørensen	Poul Morville	
1918–21	No competitions held				
1922	Copenhagen	Peter Sørensen	Holger Thiel	No other competitors	
1923	No competition held				
1924	Copenhagen	Peter Sørensen	Sven Sørensen	Rudy Sürig	
1925–28	No competitions held				
1929	Copenhagen	Peter Sørensen	No other competitors listed		
1930–39	No competitions held				
1940	Copenhagen	Per Cock-Clausen	(No records found)		
1941	Copenhagen	Per Cock-Clausen	Harry Meistrup	No other competitors	
1942	Copenhagen	Per Cock-Clausen	(No records found)		
1943–45	No competitions due to World War II				
1946	Copenhagen	Per Cock-Clausen	(No records found)		(Note: Per Cock-Clausen was the undefeated men's champion from 1940 to 1963.)
1947	Copenhagen	Per Cock-Clausen	Alf Refer	Rudolf Ørum	
1948	Copenhagen	Per Cock-Clausen	(No records found)		
1949–53	No competitions held				
1954	Copenhagen	Per Cock-Clausen	(No records found)		
1955	Copenhagen	Per Cock-Clausen	Ivan Højland Christensen	Rottbøl Ørum	
1956	Frederiksberg	Per Cock-Clausen	Ivan Højland Christensen	No other competitors	
1957–59	No competitions held				
1960	(No record found)	Per Cock-Clausen	(No records found)		
1961	Copenhagen	Per Cock-Clausen	(No records found)		
1962	Copenhagen	Per Cock-Clausen	Arne Hoffmann	No other competitors	
1963	Copenhagen	Per Cock-Clausen	Arne Hoffmann	No other competitors	
1964	Copenhagen	Arne Hoffmann	Per Cock-Clausen	Gert Hammer	
1965	Copenhagen	Arne Hoffmann	Per Cock-Clausen	Finn Olsen	
1966	Copenhagen	Arne Hoffmann	(No records found)		
1967	Copenhagen	Arne Hoffmann	John Ferdinandsen	Preben Lindencrone Sørensen	
1968	Copenhagen	Arne Hoffmann	Preben Lindencrone Sørensen	Carsten Larsen	
1969	Aalborg	Preben Lindencrone Sørensen	John Ferdinandsen	Arne Hoffmann	
1970	Frederikshavn	Arne Hoffmann	Preben Lindencrone Sørensen	John Ferdinandsen	
1971	Aalborg	John Ferdinandsen	Arne Hoffmann	Carl Hoffmann	
1972	Copenhagen	John Ferdinandsen	Arne Hoffmann	Mogens Frederiksen	
1973	Copenhagen	Preben Lindencrone Sørensen	(No records found)		
1974	Vojens	Preben Lindencrone Sørensen	Flemming Søderquist	Mogens Frederiksen	
1975	Frederikshavn	Flemming Søderquist	Jan Glerup	Mogens Frederiksen	
1976	Brøndby	Flemming Søderquist	Jan Glerup	Kaj Christian Hoffmann	
1977	Frederikshavn	Flemming Søderquist	Jan Glerup	Kaj Christian Hoffmann	
1978	Herlev	Jan Glerup	Flemming Søderquist	No other competitors	
1979	Esbjerg	No men's competitors			
1980	Copenhagen	Jan Glerup (Note: Jan Glreup did not achieve the minimum required score to named the Danish Champion.)	No other competitors		
1981	Aalborg	Fini Ravn	Todd Sand	Jens Nielsen	
1982	Hørsholm	Todd Sand	Fini Ravn	Thomas Øberg	
1983	Frederikshavn	Todd Sand	Lars Dresler	Fini Ravn	
1984	Herlev	Lars Dresler	Fini Ravn	No other competitors	
1985	Esbjerg	Lars Dresler	Henrik Walentin	Fini Ravn	
1986	Copenhagen	Lars Dresler	Henrik Walentin	Fini Ravn	
1987	Aalborg	Lars Dresler	Henrik Walentin	No other competitors	
1988	Hvidovre	Lars Dresler	Henrik Walentin	No other competitors	
1989	Odense	Henrik Walentin	Lars Dresler	No other competitors	
1990	Brøndby	Henrik Walentin	No other competitors		
1991	Aarhus	Henrik Walentin	Michael Tyllesen	No other competitors	
1992	Herlev	Michael Tyllesen	Henrik Walentin	No other competitors	
1993	Frederikshavn	Michael Tyllesen	Henrik Walentin	Johnny Rønne Jensen	
1994	Copenhagen	Michael Tyllesen	Johnny Rønne Jensen	Henrik Walentin	
1995	Frederikshavn	Johnny Rønne Jensen	Michael Tyllesen	No other competitors	
1996	Gentofte	Michael Tyllesen	Johnny Rønne Jensen	No other competitors	
1997	Frederikshavn	Michael Tyllesen	Johnny Rønne Jensen	Lasse Bech	
1998	Esbjerg	Johnny Rønne Jensen	Lasse Bech	No other competitors	
1999	Aarhus	Johnny Rønne Jensen	Tem Lylloff	No other competitors	
2000	Hørsholm	Michael Tyllesen	Johnny Rønne Jensen	Lasse Bech	
2001	Aalborg	Peter Bækgaard Kjær	No other competitors		
2002	Rødovre	Peter Bækgaard Kjær	No other competitors		
2003	Herning	Peter Bækgaard Kjær	Michael Felding	No other competitors	
2004	Herlev	Michael Felding	No other competitors		
2005	Odense	Michael Felding	Nicolai Siersted	No other competitors	
2006	Tårnby	Michael Felding (Note: Michael Felding did not achieve the minimum required score to be named the Danish champion.)	No other competitors		
2007	Frederikshavn	Nicolai Siersted	No other competitors		
2008	Gladsaxe	Justus Strid	No other competitors		
2009	Esbjerg	Justus Strid	Jesper Thræntoft Kristiansen	No other competitors	
2010	Frederikshavn	Justus Strid	No other competitors		
2011	Aarhus	Justus Strid	No other competitors		
2012	Hvidovre	Justus Strid	No other competitors		
2013	Aalborg	Justus Strid	Keiran Araza	No other competitors	
2014	Herlev	Justus Strid	Keiran Araza	No other competitors	
2015	Herning	Keiran Araza	No other competitors		
2016	Tårnby	Keiran Araza	No other competitors		
2017–18	No men's competitors				
2019	Odense	Nikolaj Pedersen	No other competitors		
2020	Gentofte	Daniel Tsion	Nikolaj Pedersen	No other competitors	
2021	Frederikshavn	No competitions due to the COVID-19 pandemic			
2022	Frederikshavn	Daniel Tsion	Nikolaj Pedersen	No other competitors	
2023	Rødovre	Nikolaj Pedersen	No other competitors		
2024–26	No men's competitors				

=== Women's singles ===
Women's event medalists
Year	Location	Gold	Silver	Bronze	Ref.
1912	Copenhagen	Gerda Iversen	Astrid Dalberg	Magda Eglund	
1913–16	No competitions held				
1917	Copenhagen	Alice Krayenbühl	Gerda Iversen	No other competitors	
1918–21	No competitions held				
1922	Copenhagen	Alice Krayenbühl	Ehly Sørensen	No other competitors	
1923	No competition held				
1924	Copenhagen	Alice Jeppesen	Inger Agerskov	No other competitors	
1925–28	No competitions held				
1929	Copenhagen	No women's competitors			
1930–39	No competitions held				
1940	Copenhagen	Ester Bornstein (née Kolni)	(No records found)		
1941	Copenhagen	Ester Bornstein (née Kolni)	Inger Weitzmann	No other competitors	
1942	Copenhagen	Ester Bornstein (née Kolni)	(No records found)		
1943–45	No competitions due to World War II				
1946	Copenhagen	Eva Meistrup	(No records found)		
1947	Copenhagen	Ester Bornstein (née Kolni)	Eva Meistrup	Grethe Fischer	
1948	Copenhagen	Eva Meistrup	(No records found)		
1949–53	No competitions held				
1954	Copenhagen	Eva Meistrup	(No records found)		
1955	Copenhagen	Bente Palle Sørensen	Eva Meistrup	(No record found)	
1956	Frederiksberg	Eva Meistrup	Ayoe Bardram (née Kondrup)	Grethe Fischer	
1957–59	No competitions held				
1960	(No record found)	Ayoe Bardram (née Kondrup)	(No records found)		
1961	Copenhagen	Eva Petersen	(No records found)		
1962	Copenhagen	Eva Petersen	Hanne Flygenring	No other competitors	
1963	Copenhagen	Hanne Flygenring	Eva Petersen	No other competitors	
1964	Copenhagen	Marianne Bæk	Lizzia Reidt	No other competitors	
1965	Copenhagen	Marianne Bæk	Jette Vad	Kirsten Nicolaj	
1966	Copenhagen	Jette Vad	(No records found)		
1967	Copenhagen	Jette Vad	Kirsten Nicolaj	Linda Madsen	
1968	Copenhagen	Jette Vad	Kirsten Nicolaj	Linda Madsen	
1969	Aalborg	Jette Vad	Hanne Jensen	Kirsten Frikke	
1970	Frederikshavn	Kirsten Frikke	Linda Madsen	Hanne Jensen	
1971	Aalborg	Kirsten Frikke	Hanne Jensen	Liselotte Størm-Johansen	
1972	Copenhagen	Kirsten Frikke	Hanne Jensen	Susanne Hedegaard	
1973	Copenhagen	Hanne Jensen	Kirsten Frikke	Unknown (Note: The identity of the third-place finisher in the women's event was not published. The Frederikshavns Avis reported the names of the fourth- and fifth-place finishers (Grethe Wæhrens and Randi Larsen, respectively), as they were skaters at the local skating club in Frederikshavn.)	
1974	Vojens	Hanne Jensen	Kirsten Frikke	Susanne Hedegaard	
1975	Frederikshavn	Jeanette Mingon	Elisabeth Nielsen	Anni Petersen	
1976	Brøndby	Jeanette Mingon	Stella Bristing	Anne Erlandsson	
1977	Frederikshavn	Jeanette Mingon	Connie Jensen	Stella Bristing	
1978	Herlev	Jeanette Mingon	Anne Erlandsson	Stella Bristing	
1979	Esbjerg	Jeanette Mingon	Heidi Bartelsen	Hanne Gamborg	
1980	Copenhagen	Heidi Bartelsen	Hanne Gamborg	Mette Kofoed	
1981	Aalborg	Heidi Bartelsen	Hanne Gamborg	Charlotte Carlsen	
1982	Hørsholm	Anette Nygaard	Hanne Gamborg	Heidi Bartelsen	
1983	Frederikshavn	Hanne Gamborg	Anette Nygaard	Anne Marie Jensen	
1984	Herlev	Hanne Gamborg	Anette Nygaard	Mette Andersen	
1985	Esbjerg	Connie Sjøholm Jørgensen	Tina Hegner	Anette Nygaard	
1986	Copenhagen	Tina Hegner	Connie Sjøholm Jørgensen	Anette Nygaard	
1987	Aalborg	Connie Sjøholm Jørgensen	Kristina Jannerdahl	Anette Nygaard	
1988	Hvidovre	Anisette Torp-Lind	Birgitta Lausten	Kristina Jannerdal	
1989	Odense	Anisette Torp-Lind	Maria Fuglsang	Kristina Jannerdal	
1990	Brøndby	Anisette Torp-Lind	Maria Fuglsang	Mette Andersen	
1991	Aarhus	Anisette Torp-Lind	Maria Fuglsang	Mette Andersen	
1992	Herlev	Anisette Torp-Lind	Tina Hestbæk	Charlotte Pedersen	
1993	Frederikshavn	Anisette Torp-Lind	Mette Andersen	Maria Fuglsang	
1994	Copenhagen	Anisette Torp-Lind	Maria Fuglsang	Anne-Mette Poulsen	
1995	Frederikshavn	Maria Fuglsang	Anne-Mette Poulsen	Tina Hestbæk	
1996	Gentofte	Maria Fuglsang	Julia Sandsten	Anne-Mette Poulsen	
1997	Frederikshavn	Julia Sandsten	Marie Louise Deistler	Kristine Kierkgaard	
1998	Esbjerg	Veronica Krohg	Marie Louise Deistler	Kristine Kierkgaard	
1999	Aarhus	Maria Louise Deistler	Maria Jensen	Line Petersen	
2000	Hørsholm	Mikkeline Kierkgaard	Maria Louise Deistler	Maria Jensen	
2001	Aalborg	Sarah Nymann	Rikke Petersen	Line Petersen	
2002	Rødovre	Christina Lykke Kristensen	Maria Louise Deistler	Helle Larsen	
2003	Herning	Pernille Holkjær	Christina Sørensen	Maria Kjær	
2004	Herlev	Christina Lykke Kristensen	Pernille Holkjær	Irina Babenko	
2005	Odense	Christina Sørensen	No other competitors		
2006	Tårnby	Natasha Lee Dann	Irina Babenko	No other competitors	
2007	Frederikshavn	Natasha Lee Dann	Malene Svensson	No other competitors	
2008	Gladsaxe	Maria Kristensen	Irina Babenko	Mette Pedersen	
2009	Esbjerg	Karina Johnson	Maria Kristensen	Mia Brix	
2010	Frederikshavn	Karina Johnson	Sofie Castler	Maria Kristensen	
2011	Aarhus	Karina Johnson	Louise Wessberg	Signe Jakobsen	
2012	Hvidovre	Karina Johnson	Signe Jakobsen	Sofie Castler	
2013	Aalborg	Anita Madsen	Karina Johnson	Signe Jakobsen	
2014	Herlev	Anita Madsen	Daria Podtelejnikova	Signe Jakobsen	
2015	Herning	Pernille Sørensen	Daria Podtelejnikova	No other competitors	
2016	Tårnby	Daria Podtelejnikova	No other competitors		
2017	Vojens	Emma Andersen	Emma Jensen	Malene Andersen	
2018	Hørsholm	Pernille Sørensen	Emma Andersen	Malene Andersen	
2019	Odense	Pernille Sørensen	Josephine Kærsgaard	Emma Andersen	
2020	Gentofte	Camilla Grue	Sofie Korsgaard	No other competitors	
2021	Frederikshavn	No competitions due to the COVID-19 pandemic			
2022	Frederikshavn	Maia Sørensen	Amalie Christensen	Felice Basbøll	
2023	Rødovre	Maia Sørensen	Annika Skibby	Freja Jensen	
2024	Herlev	Annika Skibby	Nicole Jensen	Mia Jensen	
2025	Hørsholm	Anna-Flora Colmor Jepsen	Annika Skibby	Nicole Jensen	
2026	Copenhagen	Anna-Flora Colmor Jepsen	Babeth Hansson-Östergaard	Selmasiri Larsen	

=== Pairs ===
Pairs event medalists
Year	Location	Gold	Silver	Bronze	Ref.
1912	Copenhagen	Inger Morville; Folmer Søgaard	Ehly Sørensen; Rudy Sürig	No other competitors	
1913–16	No competitions held				
1917	Copenhagen	Fru Quinlan; Rudy Sürig	Ehly Sørensen; Peter Sørensen	Inger Morville; Folmer Søgaard	
1918–21	No competitions held				
1922	Copenhagen	No pairs competitors			
1923	No competition held				
1924	Copenhagen	Fru Quinlan; Rudy Sürig	Ehly Sørensen; Peter Sørensen	No other competitors	
1925–39	No competitions held				
1940	Copenhagen	Inger Weitzmann; Harry Meistrup	No other competitors		(Note: Inger Weitzmann and Harry Meistrup won three pairs' championship titles.)
1941	Copenhagen	Inger Weitzmann; Harry Meistrup	No other competitors		
1942	Copenhagen	Inger Weitzmann; Harry Meistrup	(No records found)		
1943–45	No competitions due to World War II				
1946	Copenhagen	Grethe Fischer; Alf Refer	(No records found)		
1947	Copenhagen	Inger Weitzmann; Alf Refer	Eva Meistrup; Harry Meistrup	No other competitors	
1948	Copenhagen	Eva Meistrup; Harry Meistrup	(No records found)		
1949–53	No competitions held				
1954	Copenhagen	Eva Meistrup; Harry Meistrup	(No records found)		
1955	Copenhagen	Ayoe Bardram (née Kondrup); Alf Refer	(No record found)	No other competitors	
1956	Frederiksberg	Ayoe Bardram (née Kondrup); Alf Refer	Eva Meistrup; Harry Meistrup	No other competitors	
1957–59	No competitions held				
1960	(No record found)	Ayoe Bardram (née Kondrup); Alf Refer	(No records found)		(Note: Ayoe Bardram (née Kondrup) and Alf Refer won six pairs' championship titles together.)
1961	Copenhagen	Ayoe Bardram (née Kondrup); Alf Refer	(No records found)		
1962	Copenhagen	Lisa Reith Nielsen; Alf Refer	Pia Møller; Jørgen Svendsen	No other competitors	
1963	Copenhagen	Ayoe Bardram (née Kondrup); Alf Refer	(No records found)		
1964	Copenhagen	Pia Møller; Jørgen Hansen	Eva Petersen; Alf Refer	No other competitors	
1965	Copenhagen	Ayoe Bardram (née Kondrup); Alf Refer	No other competitors		
No pairs competitors since 1965

=== Ice dance ===
Ice dance event medalists
Year	Location	Gold	Silver	Bronze	Ref.
1964	Copenhagen	Hanne Sønderup; Jørgen Svendsen	Jette Steinhauer; Leif Steinhauer	No other competitors	
1965	Copenhagen	Hanne Sønderup; Jørgen Svendsen	Jette Steinhauer; Leif Steinhauer	No other competitors	
1966	Copenhagen	Hanne Sønderup; Jørgen Svendsen	(No records found)		
1967	Copenhagen	Jette Steinhauer; Leif Steinhauer	No other competitors		
1968	Copenhagen	Vivi Poulsen (née Christiansen); Kurt Poulsen	No other competitors		
1969	Aalborg	Vivi Poulsen (née Christiansen); Kurt Poulsen	No other competitors		
1970	Frederikshavn	Vivi Poulsen (née Christiansen); Kurt Poulsen	No other competitors		
1971	Aalborg	Vivi Poulsen (née Christiansen); Kurt Poulsen	No other competitors		
1972	Copenhagen	Vivi Poulsen (née Christiansen); Kurt Poulsen	No other competitors		
1973	Copenhagen	Vivi Poulsen (née Christiansen); Kurt Poulsen	No other competitors		(Note: Vivi and Kurt Poulsen won six ice dance championship titles from 1968 to 1973.)
1974–98	No ice dance competitors				
1999	Aarhus	Annemette Poulsen; David Blazek	No other competitors		
2000–09	No ice dance competitors				
2010	Frederikshavn	Katelyn Good; Nikolaj Sørensen	Stephanie Baadsgaard Snider; Athur Goncharov	No other competitors	
2011	Aarhus	Stephanie Baadsgaard Snider; Athur Goncharov	No other competitors		
2012–13	No ice dance competitors				
2014	Herlev	Laurence Fournier Beaudry; Nikolaj Sørensen	No other competitors		
2015	Herning	Laurence Fournier Beaudry; Nikolaj Sørensen	No other competitors		
2016–17	No ice dance competitors				
2018	Hørsholm	Laurence Fournier Beaudry; Nikolaj Sørensen	No other competitors		
2019	Odense	No ice dance competitors			
2020	Gentofte	Elisabetta Iincardona; Rafael Marc Drozd Musil	No other competitors		
2021	Frederikshavn	No competitions due to the COVID-19 pandemic			
2022	Frederikshavn	No ice dance competitors			
2023	Rødovre	Elisabetta Iincardona; Rafael Marc Drozd Musil	No other competitors		
2024	Herlev	Elisabetta Iincardona; Rafael Marc Drozd Musil	No other competitors		
2025	Hørsholm	Elisabetta Iincardona; Rafael Marc Drozd Musil	No other competitors		
2026	No ice dance competitors				

== Junior medalists ==
=== Men's singles ===
Junior men's event medalists
Year	Location	Gold	Silver	Bronze	Ref.
2011	Aarhus	Keiran Araza	No other competitors		
2012	Hvidovre	Keiran Araza	No other competitors		
2013–14	No junior men's competitors				
2015	Herning	Daniel Tsion	No other competitors		
2016	Tårnby	Daniel Tsion	Nikolaj Pedersen	No other competitors	
2017	Vojens	Daniel Tsion	Nikolaj Pedersen	Linus Colmor Jepsen	
2018	Hørsholm	Daniel Tsion	Nikolaj Pedersen	Lucas Strezlec	
2019	Odense	Daniel Tsion	Lucas Strezlec	No other competitors	
2020	Gentofte	No junior men's competitors			
2021	Frederikshavn	No competitions due to the COVID-19 pandemic			
2022	Frederikshavn	No junior men's competitors			
2023	Rødovre	Dimitri Steffensen	No other competitors		
2024	Herlev	Wendell Hansson-Østergaard	Dimitri Steffensen	No other competitors	
2025	Hørsholm	Wendell Hansson-Østergaard	Dimitri Steffensen	Sigurd Nikolaj Uhd Weldingh	
2026	Copenhagen	Wendell Hansson-Østergaard	Dimitri Steffensen	Sigurd Nikolaj Uhd Weldingh	

=== Women's singles ===
Junior women's event medalists
Year	Location	Gold	Silver	Bronze	Ref.
2011	Aarhus	Anita Anderberg Madsen	Daria Podtelejnikova	Emma Andersen	
2012	Hvidovre	Pernille Sørensen	Anita Anderberg Madsen	Daria Podtelejnikova	
2013	Aalborg	Pernille Sørensen	Emma Andersen	Daria Podtelejnikova	
2014	Herlev	Pernille Sørensen	Kristinna Vagtborg Jensen	Linea Trapp Matthiesen	
2015	Herning	Leonora Colmor Jepsen	Emma Frida Andersen	Cecilie Kongsbak Dreier	
2016	Tårnby	Leonora Colmor Jepsen	Emma Frida Andersen	Vanessa Sevidova	
2017	Vojens	Josephine Kærsgaard	Cecilie Kongsbak Dreier	Jane Iskov	
2018	Hørsholm	Jane Iskov	Caroline Oreskov Christoffersen	Josephine Kærsgaard	
2019	Odense	Maia Sørensen	Jane Iskov	Vanessa Sevidova	
2020	Gentofte	Maia Sørensen	Catharina Victoria Petersen	Amalie Borup Christensen	
2021	Frederikshavn	No competitions due to the COVID-19 pandemic			
2022	Frederikshavn	Catharina Victoria Petersen	Babeth Hansson-Östergaard	Anna-Flora Colmor Jepsen	
2023	Rødovre	Anna-Flora Colmor Jepsen	Selmasiri Bella Larsen	Camilla Vinther Poulsen	
2024	Herlev	Camilla Vinther Poulsen	Emilia Due Borch	Selmasiri Bella Larsen	
2025	Hørsholm	Camilla Vinther Poulsen	Emilia Due Borch	Fie Egan Magnussen	
2026	Copenhagen	Emilia Due Borch	Camilla Vinther Poulsen	Nikoline Ida Kristensen	

=== Ice dance ===
Junior ice dance event medalists
Year	Location	Gold	Silver	Bronze	Ref.
2011	Aarhus	No junior ice dance competitors			
2012	Hvidovre	Stephanie Baadsgaard Snider; Stepan Dubrovski	No other competitors		
2013	Aalborg	No junior ice dance competitors			
2014	Herlev	Sarah Vadskjær Grapek; Malcolm Jones	No other competitors		
2015	Herning	Sarah Vadskjær Grapek; Malcolm Jones	No other competitors		
2016	Tårnby	No junior ice dance competitors			
2017	Vojens	Leonora Colmor Jepsen; Linus Colmor Jepsen	Marine Bertau; Rafael Marc Drozd Musil	No other competitors	
2018–19	No junior ice dance competitors				
2020	Gentofte	Sara Buch-Weeke; Nicolas Woodcock	No other competitors		
2021	Frederikshavn	No competitions due to the COVID-19 pandemic			
No junior ice dance competitors since 2020

== Records ==
Records
Discipline	Most championship titles			
Discipline	Skater(s)	No.	Years	Ref.
Men's singles	Per Cock-Clausen	13	1940–42; 1946–48; 1954–56; 1960–63	
Women's singles	Anisette Torp-Lind	7	1988–94	
Pairs	Ayoe Bardram; Alf Refer	6	1955–56; 1960–61; 1963; 1965	
Pairs	Alf Refer; (Note: Alf Refer won one championship title with Grethe Fischer (1946), one with Inger Weitzman (1947), six with Ayoe Bardram (1955–56, 1960–61, 1963, 1965), and one with Lisa Reith Nielsen (1962).)	9	1946–47; 1955–56; 1960–63; 1965	
Ice dance	Vivi Christiansen; Kurt Poulsen	6	1968–1973	
