= Denmark at the 1952 Winter Olympics =

- IOC code: DEN
- NOC: Danish Olympic Committee

in Oslo
- Competitors: 1 (man) in 1 sport
- Flag bearer: Per Cock-Clausen
- Medals: Gold 0 Silver 0 Bronze 0 Total 0

Winter Olympics appearances (overview)
- 1948; 1952; 1956; 1960; 1964; 1968; 1972–1984; 1988; 1992; 1994; 1998; 2002; 2006; 2010; 2014; 2018; 2022; 2026

Denmark sent a delegation to compete at the 1952 Winter Olympics in Oslo, Norway from 14 to 25 February 1952. The kingdom was making their second appearance at a Winter Olympic Games. They were represented by one figure skater, second-time Olympian Per Cock-Clausen. In the men's singles' competition, he came in 14th and last place.

== Background ==
Denmark joined the modern Olympic movement at the beginning, participating in the first modern Games, the 1896 Summer Olympics. The National Olympic Committee and Sports Confederation of Denmark was formally recognised by the International Olympic Committee on 1 January 1905. Denmark has sent a team to every Summer Olympic Games except the 1904 St. Louis Olympics, and they first participated in the Winter Olympic Games in the 1948 St. Moritz Olympics. These Oslo Olympics were therefore their second appearance at a Winter Games. The 1952 Winter Olympics were held in Oslo, Norway from 14 to 25 February 1952; a total of 694 athletes representing 30 National Olympic Committees took part. In Oslo, Denmark was represented by a single figure skater, Per Cock-Clausen, who carried the Danish flag in the opening ceremony.

== Figure skating ==
Per Cock-Clausen was 39 years old at the time of these Oslo Olympics, and had previously represented Denmark at the 1948 Winter Olympics. At the 1948 Winter Olympics, he had come in 16th and last place in the men's singles event. The Oslo men's singles were held over 19–21 February 1952. The rankings were determined by ordinal placement by judges, with the compulsory figures being worth 60% of the final result, and the free skating portion worth 40%. On 19 February, Cock-Clausen finished tenth in the compulsory figures, his highest ranking by any judge was ninth, and his lowest ranking was fourteenth out of fourteen skaters. In the free skating portion, held two days later, he received fourteenth place marks from six out of nine judges, and this was his ranking for the final portion of the competition. His final placement for the competition was fourteenth and last. The gold medal was won by Dick Button of the United States, the silver by Austrian Hellmut Seibt, and the bronze was earned by fellow American James Grogan.

| Athlete | Compulsory Figures | Free Skate | Points | Places | Rank |
|---|---|---|---|---|---|
| Per Cock-Clausen | 10 | 14 | 133.722 | 112 | 14 |

== See also ==
- Denmark at the 1952 Summer Olympics
