= Hanne Gamborg =

Danish figure skater

Personal information
- Born: 1960s

Figure skating career
- Country: Denmark
- Retired: c. 1983

Hanne Gamborg Ekberg was born in 1962. She is a Danish former competitive figure skater. She is the 1983 Nordic champion and a two-time Danish national champion. She represented Denmark at ISU Championships in the 1980s. In her final competitive season, she placed 19th at the 1983 European Championships in Dortmund and 20th at the 1983 World Championships in Helsinki.

== Competitive highlights ==
International
Event	78–79	79–80	80–81	81–82	82–83	83-84
World Champ.		27th	27th	25th	20th	
European Champ.		23rd			19th	
Nordics			2nd		1st	
International: Junior
World Junior Champ.	17th					
National
Danish Champ.	3rd	2nd	2nd	2nd	1st	1st
