= Denmark at the 1948 Winter Olympics =

- IOC code: DEN
- NOC: Danish Olympic Committee

in St. Moritz
- Competitors: 2 (men) in 2 sports
- Flag bearer: Knud Tønsberg
- Medals: Gold 0 Silver 0 Bronze 0 Total 0

Winter Olympics appearances (overview)
- 1948; 1952; 1956; 1960; 1964; 1968; 1972–1984; 1988; 1992; 1994; 1998; 2002; 2006; 2010; 2014; 2018; 2022; 2026

Denmark competed at the Winter Olympic Games for the first time at the 1948 Winter Olympics in St. Moritz, Switzerland.

== Figure skating ==
Men

Athlete	CF	FS	Points	Places	Final rank
Per Cock-Clausen	15	16	145.533	135	16

== Speed skating ==
Men

Event	Athlete	Race	
Event	Athlete	Time	Rank
500 m	Aage Justesen	46.4	29
