= Johnny Rønne Jensen =

Danish figure skater

Personal information
- Born: 16 November 1974 (age 51) Copenhagen, Denmark
- Height: 1.81 m (5 ft 11 1/2 in)

Figure skating career
- Country: Denmark
- Retired: 2000

Johnny Rønne Jensen (born 16 November 1974) is a Danish former competitive figure skater. He is the 1996 Piruetten silver medalist, a three-time Nordic champion, and a three-time Danish national champion. He competed at three European Championships, achieving his best result in 1999.

== Competitive highlights ==
International
Event	1993–94	1994–95	1995–96	1996–97	1997–98	1998–99	1999–00
European Champ.		20th			22nd	19th	
Finlandia					11th	6th	9th
Nebelhorn			6th	10th		8th	12th
Nordics	2nd	3rd	2nd	1st	1st	1st	2nd
Piruetten				2nd			
Skate Israel						WD	
Universiade				12th			
National
Danish Champ.		1st			1st	1st	2nd
WD = Withdrew
