= Karina Johnson =

Danish-American figure skater

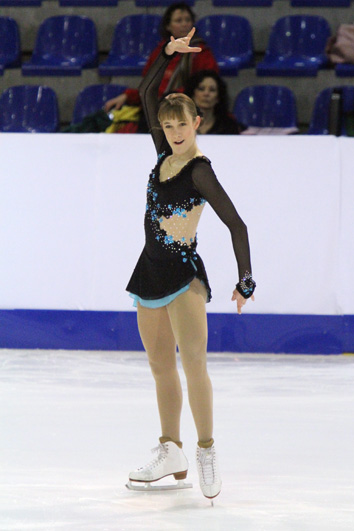
- Johnson in 2010

Personal information
- Full name: Karina Sinding Johnson
- Born: May 1, 1991 (age 35) West Hills, California, U.S.
- Height: 5 ft 10 in (1.78 m)

Figure skating career
- Country: Denmark
- Coach: Kent Johnson; Jane Johnson
- Skating club: Hvidovre Skøjte Klub
- Retired: January 2013

Karina Sinding Johnson (born May 1, 1991 in West Hills, Los Angeles, California, United States of America) is a Danish-American former competitive figure skater. She is a four-time Danish national champion.

Johnson began skating at age five in Los Angeles, California. She later moved to Houston, Texas and then Miami, Florida. She retired from competition in January 2013.

Her parents are both figure skating coaches. Her father, Kent, is a PSA Double Master Rated Coach, Level 8. Johnson's father is American and her mother is Danish.

== Competitive highlights ==
Results
International
Event	2005–06	2006–07	2007–08	2008–09	2009–10	2010–11	2011–12	2012–13
Worlds					35th	26th	35th	
Europeans				35th	32nd	17th	24th	
Bavarian Open							17th	
Coupe de Nice					15th			
Nebelhorn					20th	10th		
Nordics	14th J.	10th J.	10th J.	8th	6th	7th	9th	
U.S. Classic								8th
International: Junior or novice
Junior Worlds				29th	16th			
JGP Croatia			22nd					
JGP Germany			16th					
JGP Gr. Britain				10th				
JGP Mexico				7th				
Copenhagen			3rd J.					
Triglav		2nd J.						
National
Danish Champ.	3rd J.	2nd J.	1st J.	1st	1st	1st	1st	2nd
