= Denmark at the 2018 Winter Olympics =

- Flag of Denmark
- IOC code: DEN
- NOC: National Olympic Committee and Sports Confederation of Denmark
- Website: www.dif.dk/en

in Pyeongchang, South Korea 9–25 February 2018
- Competitors: 17 (10 men and 7 women) in 5 sports
- Flag bearer (opening): Elena Møller Rigas
- Flag bearer (closing): Viktor Hald Thorup
- Medals: Gold 0 Silver 0 Bronze 0 Total 0

Winter Olympics appearances (overview)
- 1948; 1952; 1956; 1960; 1964; 1968; 1972–1984; 1988; 1992; 1994; 1998; 2002; 2006; 2010; 2014; 2018; 2022; 2026

The Kingdom of Denmark is a sovereign state comprising three constituent countries: Denmark, Greenland and the Faroe Islands that competed at the 2018 Winter Olympics in Pyeongchang, South Korea, from 9 to 25 February 2018, with 17 competitors in 5 sports. On 9 January 2018, speed skater Elena Møller Rigas was named as the country's flagbearer during the opening ceremony.

== Competitors ==
The following is the list of number of competitors participating at the Games per sport/discipline.

Sport	Men	Women	Total
Alpine skiing	2	0	2
Cross-country skiing	1	0	1
Curling	5	5	10
Freestyle skiing	0	1	1
Speed skating	2	1	3
Total	10	7	17

== Alpine skiing ==
Denmark qualified one athlete, and received one additional quota place.

Athlete	Event	Run 1		Run 2		Total	
Athlete	Event	Time	Rank	Time	Rank	Time	Rank
Christoffer Faarup	Men's combined	1:21.08	20	54.13	34	2:15.21	30
Christoffer Faarup	Men's downhill	—N/a				1:44.48	36
Christoffer Faarup	Men's super-G	—N/a				1:27.81	32
Casper Dyrbye Næsted	Men's giant slalom	1:20.33	69	1:18.01	56	2:38.34	60
Casper Dyrbye Næsted	Men's slalom	DNF					

== Cross-country skiing ==
Denmark qualified one male athlete.

Distance

Athlete	Event	Final		
Athlete	Event	Time	Deficit	Rank
Martin Møller	Men's 15 km freestyle	39:35.4	+5:51.5	90
Martin Møller	Men's 50 km classical	2:36:10.8	+27:48.7	60

== Curling ==
Denmark qualified both a men's and a women's team by qualifying via the qualification event in Plzeň, Czech Republic.

Summary

Team	Event	Group stage										Tiebreaker	Semifinal	Final / BM
Team	Event	Opposition Score	Opposition Score	Opposition Score	Opposition Score	Opposition Score	Opposition Score	Opposition Score	Opposition Score	Opposition Score	Rank	Opposition Score	Opposition Score	Rank
Rasmus Stjerne; Johnny Frederiksen; Mikkel Poulsen; Oliver Dupont; Morten Thomsen	Men's tournament	(Sweden) SWE; L 5–9	(Switzerland) SUI; L 7–9	(Italy) ITA; W 6–4	(United States) USA; L 5–9	(Norway) NOR; L 8–10	(South Korea) KOR; W 9–8	(United Kingdom) GBR; L 6–7	(Japan) JPN; L 4–6	(Canada) CAN; L 3–8	10	Did not advance		
Madeleine Dupont; Denise Dupont; Julie Høgh; Mathilde Halse; Lina Knudsen	Women's tournament	(Sweden) SWE; L 3–9	(Japan) JPN; L 5–8	(Canada) CAN; W 9–8	(United Kingdom) GBR; L 6–7	(China) CHN; L 7–10	(United States) USA; L 6–7	(International Olympic Committee) OAR; L 7–8	(Switzerland) SUI; L 4–6	(South Korea) KOR; L 3–9	10	Did not advance		

=== Men's tournament ===
Final round robin standings
Team	Skip	Pld	W	L	PF	PA	EW	EL	BE	SE	S%	Qualification
Sweden	Niklas Edin	9	7	2	62	43	34	28	13	8	87%	Playoffs
Canada	Kevin Koe	9	6	3	56	46	36	34	14	8	87%	Playoffs
United States	John Shuster	9	5	4	67	63	37	39	4	6	80%	Playoffs
Great Britain	Kyle Smith	9	5	4	55	60	40	37	8	7	82%	Tiebreaker
Switzerland	Peter de Cruz	9	5	4	60	55	39	37	10	6	83%	Tiebreaker
Norway	Thomas Ulsrud	9	4	5	52	56	34	39	7	8	82%	
South Korea	Kim Chang-min	9	4	5	65	63	39	39	8	8	82%	
Japan	Yusuke Morozumi	9	4	5	48	56	33	35	13	5	81%	
Italy	Joël Retornaz	9	3	6	50	56	37	38	15	7	81%	
Denmark	Rasmus Stjerne	9	2	7	53	70	36	39	12	5	83%	

Round-robin

Denmark has a bye in draws 2, 6 and 10.

Draw 1

Wednesday, 14 February, 09:05

Sheet A	1	2	3	4	5	6	7	8	9	10	Final
Denmark (Stjerne)	0	0	0	2	0	0	1	0	2	0	5
Sweden (Edin) 🔨	0	2	0	0	3	2	0	1	0	1	9

Draw 3

Thursday, 15 February, 14:05

Sheet D	1	2	3	4	5	6	7	8	9	10	Final
Denmark (Stjerne)	0	0	2	0	1	1	0	2	0	1	7
Switzerland (de Cruz) 🔨	1	1	0	3	0	0	2	0	2	0	9

Draw 4

Friday, 16 February, 09:05

Sheet B	1	2	3	4	5	6	7	8	9	10	Final
Italy (Retornaz)	0	1	0	0	1	1	0	0	0	1	4
Denmark (Stjerne) 🔨	2	0	2	0	0	0	0	0	2	0	6

Draw 5

Friday, 16 February, 20:05

Sheet C	1	2	3	4	5	6	7	8	9	10	Final
Denmark (Stjerne)	0	0	0	0	2	1	0	2	0	X	5
United States (Shuster) 🔨	2	2	0	2	0	0	2	0	1	X	9

Draw 7

Sunday, 18 February, 09:05

Sheet A	1	2	3	4	5	6	7	8	9	10	Final
Norway (Ulsrud)	0	1	0	4	0	4	0	0	1	0	10
Denmark (Stjerne) 🔨	1	0	1	0	1	0	2	2	0	1	8

Draw 8

Sunday, 18 February, 20:05

Sheet B	1	2	3	4	5	6	7	8	9	10	11	Final
Denmark (Stjerne) 🔨	0	0	2	1	2	0	0	3	0	0	1	9
South Korea (Kim)	2	0	0	0	0	2	1	0	1	2	0	8

Draw 9

Monday, 19 February, 14:05

Sheet D	1	2	3	4	5	6	7	8	9	10	Final
Great Britain (Smith)	0	1	0	1	0	2	0	1	0	2	7
Denmark (Stjerne) 🔨	1	0	1	0	2	0	1	0	1	0	6

Draw 11

Tuesday, 20 February, 20:05

Sheet C	1	2	3	4	5	6	7	8	9	10	Final
Japan (Morozumi)	0	0	3	0	0	2	0	0	0	1	6
Denmark (Stjerne) 🔨	1	0	0	1	0	0	0	2	0	0	4

Draw 12

Wednesday, 21 February, 14:05

Sheet A	1	2	3	4	5	6	7	8	9	10	Final
Denmark (Stjerne)	0	1	0	1	0	0	1	X	X	X	3
Canada (Koe) 🔨	4	0	1	0	3	0	0	X	X	X	8

=== Women's tournament ===
Final round robin standings
Team	Skip	Pld	W	L	PF	PA	EW	EL	BE	SE	S%	Qualification
South Korea	Kim Eun-jung	9	8	1	75	44	41	34	5	15	79%	Playoffs
Sweden	Anna Hasselborg	9	7	2	64	48	42	34	14	13	83%	Playoffs
Great Britain	Eve Muirhead	9	6	3	61	56	39	38	12	6	79%	Playoffs
Japan	Satsuki Fujisawa	9	5	4	59	55	38	36	10	13	75%	Playoffs
China	Wang Bingyu	9	4	5	57	65	35	38	12	5	78%	
Canada	Rachel Homan	9	4	5	68	59	40	36	10	12	81%	
Switzerland	Silvana Tirinzoni	9	4	5	60	55	34	37	12	7	78%	
United States	Nina Roth	9	4	5	56	65	38	39	7	6	78%	
Olympic Athletes from Russia	Victoria Moiseeva	9	2	7	45	76	34	40	8	6	76%	
Denmark	Madeleine Dupont	9	1	8	50	72	32	41	10	6	73%	

Round-robin

Denmark has a bye in draws 3, 7 and 10.

Draw 1

Wednesday, 14 February, 14:05

Sheet C	1	2	3	4	5	6	7	8	9	10	Final
Denmark (Dupont) 🔨	0	0	0	1	0	0	2	0	X	X	3
Sweden (Hasselborg)	1	0	2	0	2	2	0	2	X	X	9

Draw 2

Thursday, 15 February, 09:05

Sheet B	1	2	3	4	5	6	7	8	9	10	Final
Denmark (Dupont)	0	0	0	3	0	1	0	0	1	X	5
Japan (Fujisawa) 🔨	0	2	1	0	0	0	3	2	0	X	8

Draw 4

Friday, 16 February, 14:05

Sheet A	1	2	3	4	5	6	7	8	9	10	11	Final
Denmark (Dupont)	0	0	3	1	0	2	0	0	0	2	1	9
Canada (Homan) 🔨	0	2	0	0	4	0	1	1	0	0	0	8

Draw 5

Saturday, 17 February, 09:05

Sheet D	1	2	3	4	5	6	7	8	9	10	Final
Denmark (Dupont)	1	0	1	0	1	0	1	0	1	1	6
Great Britain (Muirhead) 🔨	0	2	0	1	0	2	0	2	0	0	7

Draw 6

Saturday, 17 February, 20:05

Sheet B	1	2	3	4	5	6	7	8	9	10	Final
China (Wang) 🔨	4	0	0	1	0	0	1	0	4	X	10
Denmark (Dupont)	0	1	3	0	2	0	0	1	0	X	7

Draw 8

Monday, 19 February, 09:05

Sheet A	1	2	3	4	5	6	7	8	9	10	Final
United States (Roth) 🔨	1	0	1	1	0	2	0	1	0	1	7
Denmark (Dupont)	0	1	0	0	2	0	2	0	1	0	6

Draw 9

Monday, 19 February, 20:05

Sheet B	1	2	3	4	5	6	7	8	9	10	Final
Denmark (Dupont)	0	0	0	2	0	2	0	0	3	0	7
Olympic Athletes from Russia (Moiseeva) 🔨	0	1	1	0	3	0	1	1	0	1	8

Draw 11

Wednesday, 21 February, 09:05

Sheet C	1	2	3	4	5	6	7	8	9	10	Final
Switzerland (Tirinzoni) 🔨	1	0	0	0	3	0	1	0	1	X	6
Denmark (Dupont)	0	0	0	2	0	1	0	1	0	X	4

Draw 12

Wednesday, 21 February, 20:05

Sheet D	1	2	3	4	5	6	7	8	9	10	Final
South Korea (Kim) 🔨	0	1	0	3	2	0	3	X	X	X	9
Denmark (Dupont)	0	0	2	0	0	1	0	X	X	X	3

== Freestyle skiing ==
Denmark has qualified one athlete in Freestyle Skiing.

Halfpipe

Athlete	Event	Qualification				Final				
Athlete	Event	Run 1	Run 2	Best	Rank	Run 1	Run 2	Run 3	Best	Rank
Laila Friis-Salling	Women's halfpipe	45.00	11.80	45.00	23	Did not advance				

== Speed skating ==
Denmark earned the following quotas at the conclusion of the four World Cups used for qualification. The Danish speed skating team consists of two male and one female athlete.

Mass start

Athlete	Event	Semifinal			Final		
Athlete	Event	Points	Time	Rank	Points	Time	Rank
Stefan Due Schmidt	Men's mass start	40	7:55.22	2 Q	0	7:47.53	13
Viktor Hald Thorup	Men's mass start	5	8:34.06	4 Q	8	7:57.10	5
Elena Møller Rigas	Women's mass start	0	8:54.39	9	Did not advance		

== Non-competing sports ==
=== Figure skating ===
Denmark qualified an ice dancing pair, based on its placement at the 2017 World Figure Skating Championships in Helsinki, Finland. However they relinquished their allocation because Laurence Fournier Beaudry was unable to obtain clearance to participate for Denmark, because he is Canadian, not Danish.
