= Maia Sørensen =

Danish figure skater

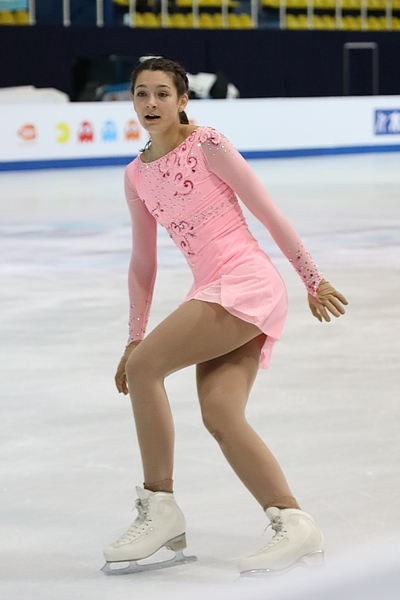
- Sørensen at the 2019 World Junior Championships

Personal information
- Born: 11 August 2004 (age 22) Vancouver, British Columbia, Canada
- Home town: Herlev, Denmark
- Height: 1.68 m (5 ft 6 in)

Figure skating career
- Country: Denmark
- Coach: Michael Huth, Anni Petersen
- Skating club: Eissportzentrum Oberstdorf
- Began skating: 2009
- Retired: 30 December 2023

Maia Sørensen (born 11 August 2004) is a Danish retired figure skater. She is a two-time Danish national champion. She represented Denmark at three ISU Championships — the 2022 European Championships, 2019 World Junior Championships and 2020 World Junior Championships.

== Early life ==
Sørensen was born on 11 August 2004 in Vancouver, British Columbia, Canada. She began skating in 2009 in her hometown of Herlev, Denmark.

== Career ==
=== 2018–19 season ===
Sørensen made her Junior Grand Prix (JGP) debut in Slovakia and finished 15th. She improved her result to 13th place at the JGP Czech Republic. She competed at the Danish Championships with an injury but then still won the junior national title. She then competed at the 2019 World Junior Championships and finished 45th in the short program after falling twice.

=== 2019–20 season ===
Sørensen withdrew from the Junior Grand Prix series due to an injury. She returned to competition and won the gold medal at the Junior Danish Championships. She finished second in the short program at the Nordic Open, but multiple falls in the free skate caused her to drop to 18th overall. She competed at the 2020 World Junior Championships and finished 39th in the short program with a score of 40.72 and failed to advance to the free skate.

=== 2020–21 season ===
In the summer of 2020, she changed training locations, moving from Denmark to Oberstdorf, Germany, where Michael Huth became her coach. She made her senior debut at the 2020 CS Nebelhorn Trophy and finished 14th. She then finished ninth at the NRW Trophy and tenth at the International Challenge Cup. She did not achieve the minimum technical elements score requirement to compete at the 2021 World Championships.

=== 2021–22 season ===
Sørensen finished 27th at both the 2021 CS Nebelhorn Trophy and the 2021 CS Warsaw Cup. She then won her first senior national title at the 2022 Danish Championships. At the 2022 European Championships, she finished 35th in the short program with a score of 40.93.

=== 2022–23 season ===
Sørensen began the season with a 21st-place finish at the 2022 CS Finlandia Trophy. She then placed 18th at the 2022 CS Budapest Trophy. Then at the NRW Trophy, she finished eighth. She then successfully defended her senior national title. She was selected to compete at the 2023 European Championships but had to withdraw due to an ankle injury.

Sørensen announced her retirement in December 2023 on her Instagram page, citing a hip injury.

== Programs ==
| Season | Short program | Free skating |
|---|---|---|
| 2022–2023 | Hit the Road Jack performed by Renee Olstead choreo. by Michael Huth | Méditation (from Thaïs) by Jules Massenet choreo. by Michael Huth |
| 2021–2022 | Cinema Paradiso by Ennio Morricone choreo. by Michael Huth | Méditation (from Thaïs) by Jules Massenet choreo. by Michael Huth |
| 2020–2021 | Cinema Paradiso by Ennio Morricone choreo. by Michael Huth | You Have to Be There (from Kristina från Duvemåla) by Benny Andersson and Björn Ulvaeus performed by Helen Sjöholm choreo. by Michael Huth |
| 2019–2020 | How Can I Not Love You? (from Anna and the King) by Joy Enriquez choreo. by Michael Huth | Perhaps, Perhaps, Perhaps performed by Doris Day; Perhaps, Perhaps, Perhaps performed by The Pussycat Dolls choreo. by Michael Huth |
| 2018–2019 | La Vie en rose performed by Romy Wave choreo. by Michael Huth | Perhaps, Perhaps, Perhaps performed by Doris Day; Perhaps, Perhaps, Perhaps performed by The Pussycat Dolls choreo. by Michael Huth |

== Results ==
CS: Challenger Series; JGP: Junior Grand Prix

International
| Event | 18–19 | 19–20 | 20–21 | 21–22 | 22–23 |
|---|---|---|---|---|---|
| Europeans | | | C | 35th | WD |
| CS Budapest | | | | | 18th |
| CS Finlandia | | | | | 21st |
| CS Nebelhorn | | | 14th | 27th | |
| CS Warsaw Cup | | | | 27th | |
| Challenge Cup | | | 10th | | |
| NRW Trophy | | | 9th | | 8th |
International: Junior
| Junior Worlds | 45th | 39th | | | |
| JGP Czech Rep. | 13th | | | | |
| JGP Slovakia | 15th | | | | |
| Nordic Open | | 17th | | | |
| Tallink Hotels Cup | | 3rd | | | |
| Tallinn Trophy | | 3rd | | | |
National
| Danish Champ. | 1st J | 1st J | C | 1st | 1st |
TBD = Assigned; C = Cancelled; WD = Withdrew
