= Denmark at the 1988 Winter Olympics =

- IOC code: DEN
- NOC: Danish Olympic Committee

in Calgary
- Competitors: 1 (man) in 1 sport
- Flag bearer: Lars Dresler
- Medals: Gold 0 Silver 0 Bronze 0 Total 0

Winter Olympics appearances (overview)
- 1948; 1952; 1956; 1960; 1964; 1968; 1972–1984; 1988; 1992; 1994; 1998; 2002; 2006; 2010; 2014; 2018; 2022; 2026

Denmark sent a delegation to compete at the 1988 Winter Olympics in Calgary, Alberta, Canada from 13 to 28 February 1988. This was Denmark's first appearance at the Winter Olympic Games since the 1968 Winter Olympics 20 years prior, and Calgary was their sixth overall appearance at the winter version of the Olympics. Denmark was represented in Calgary by a single figure skater, Lars Dresler. In the men's singles, he finished in 14th place.

== Background ==
Denmark joined the modern Olympic movement at the beginning, participating in the first modern Games, the 1896 Summer Olympics. The National Olympic Committee and Sports Confederation of Denmark was formally recognised by the International Olympic Committee on 1 January 1905. Denmark has sent a team to every Summer Olympic Games except the 1904 St. Louis Olympics, and they first participated in the Winter Olympic Games in the 1948 St. Moritz Olympics. Their participation at Winter Olympics has been sporadic, and these Calgary Games were their first time competing at a Winter Olympics since the 1968 Grenoble Olympics 20 years prior. The 1988 Winter Olympics were held in Calgary, Alberta, Canada from 13 to 28 February 1988; a total of 1,423 athletes representing 57 National Olympic Committees took part. Denmark was represented in Calgary by a single figure skater, Lars Dresler, who was selected as the flag-bearer for the opening ceremony.

== Competitors ==
The following is the list of number of competitors in the Games.

Sport	Men	Women	Total
Figure skating	1	0	1
Total	1	0	1

== Figure skating ==
Lars Dresler was 20 years old at the time of the Calgary Olympics, and was making his only Olympic appearance. The men's singles event in figure skating was held in three parts, from 17 to 20 February, compulsory figures, short program, and free skate. The compulsory figures counted 30% of the final ranking, the short program 20%, and the free skate 50% of a competitor's final total factored placements. On 17 February, Dresler came in 14th place in the compulsory figures, out of 28 competitors. The next day, he ranked 12th in the short program, and on 20 February, he placed 15th in the free skate. Using the weighting formula, he recorded a total factored placement of 28.2, which ranked him 14th overall. The gold medal was won with a total factored placement of 3.0 by Brian Boitano of the United States, the silver was won by Brian Orser of Canada, and the bronze medal was earned by Viktor Petrenko of the Soviet Union.

Athlete	Event	Compulsory Figures	Short Program	Free Skate	Total Factored Placements	Rank
Lars Dresler	Men's singles	14	12	15	28.2	14

== See also ==
- Denmark at the 1988 Summer Olympics
