= Anita Madsen =

Danish figure skater

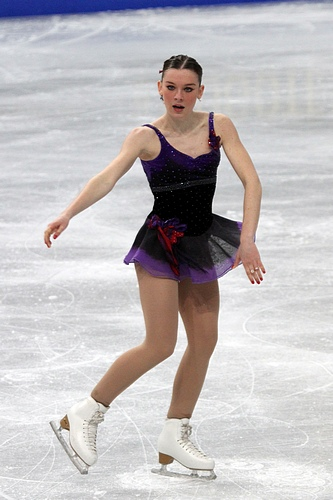
- Madsen in 2012

Personal information
- Full name: Anita Anderberg Madsen
- Born: 31 May 1995 (age 31) Glostrup, Denmark
- Home town: Bjæverskov, Køge Municipality
- Height: 1.61 m (5 ft 3 1/2 in)

Figure skating career
- Country: Denmark
- Coach: Kalle Strid, Martin Johansson
- Skating club: SC Copenhagen
- Began skating: 1999
- Retired: November 2014

Anita Anderberg Madsen (born 31 May 1995) is a Danish former competitive figure skater. She is a two-time Danish national champion, won three senior international medals, and placed 16th at the 2013 European Championships.

In November 2014, Madsen retired from competitive figure skating.

== Programs ==
Season	Short program	Free skating
2014–2015	Invincible	Music by Édith Piaf
2013–2014	Totentanz performed by Maksim Mrvica	Vendetta by Jo Blankenburg
2012–2013	Totentanz performed by Maksim Mrvica	Poeta by Vicente Amigo
2011–2012	Capriccio Espagnol by Nikolai Rimsky-Korsakov	Piano Concerto No. 3 by Sergei Rachmaninoff
2009–2010	Selections by William Joseph	Cinema Paradiso by Ennio Morricone
2008–2009	Finding Neverland by Jan Kaczmarek	Cinema Paradiso by Ennio Morricone

== Competitive highlights ==
JGP: Junior Grand Prix

International
Event	08–09	09–10	10–11	11–12	12–13	13–14	14–15
Worlds					26th	30th	
Europeans					16th	29th	
Ice Challenge					9th	5th	
Cup of Nice					11th		6th
Dragon Trophy						2nd	
HS Memorial					2nd		
Nebelhorn Trophy						25th	
Nepela Trophy						14th	
Nordics					3rd	10th	
International: Junior or novice
Junior Worlds			29th	26th			
JGP Australia				12th			
JGP Belarus	20th						
JGP Czech Rep.	15th		24th				
JGP France					11th		
JGP Italy				8th			
JGP Japan			14th				
JGP Turkey		24th			17th		
Bavarian Open				3rd J.			
Challenge Cup	9th J.						
EYOF			13th J.				
Ice Challenge		9th J.					
Nordics	10th J.	15th J.		9th J.			
Cup of Nice							
National
Danish Champ.	2nd J.	1st J.	1st J.	2nd J.	1st	1st	
J. = Junior
