= Markus Kilsgaard =

Danish cyclist (born 1992)

Markus Kilsgaard (born 23 February 1992 in Herning) is a former alpine skier and road racing cyclist from Denmark. He competed for Denmark at the 2010 Winter Olympics.

== Alpine skiing career ==
=== Olympic results ===
Year
Year	Age	Slalom	Giant; Slalom	Super G	Downhill	Combined	Team event
2010	18	DNS1	DSQ1	—	—	—	—

== Cycling career ==
After the 2011 Junior World Championships ended his skiing career, and choose the road bicycle racing. He signing the Team Netcompany - Cycling Culture, and participated 2012 Danish National Time Trial Championships where he finished 12th place. He selected two times the member of Team Post Danmark and competed the Danmark Rundt in (2012 and 2013).
