= Pernille Sørensen (figure skater) =

Danish figure skater

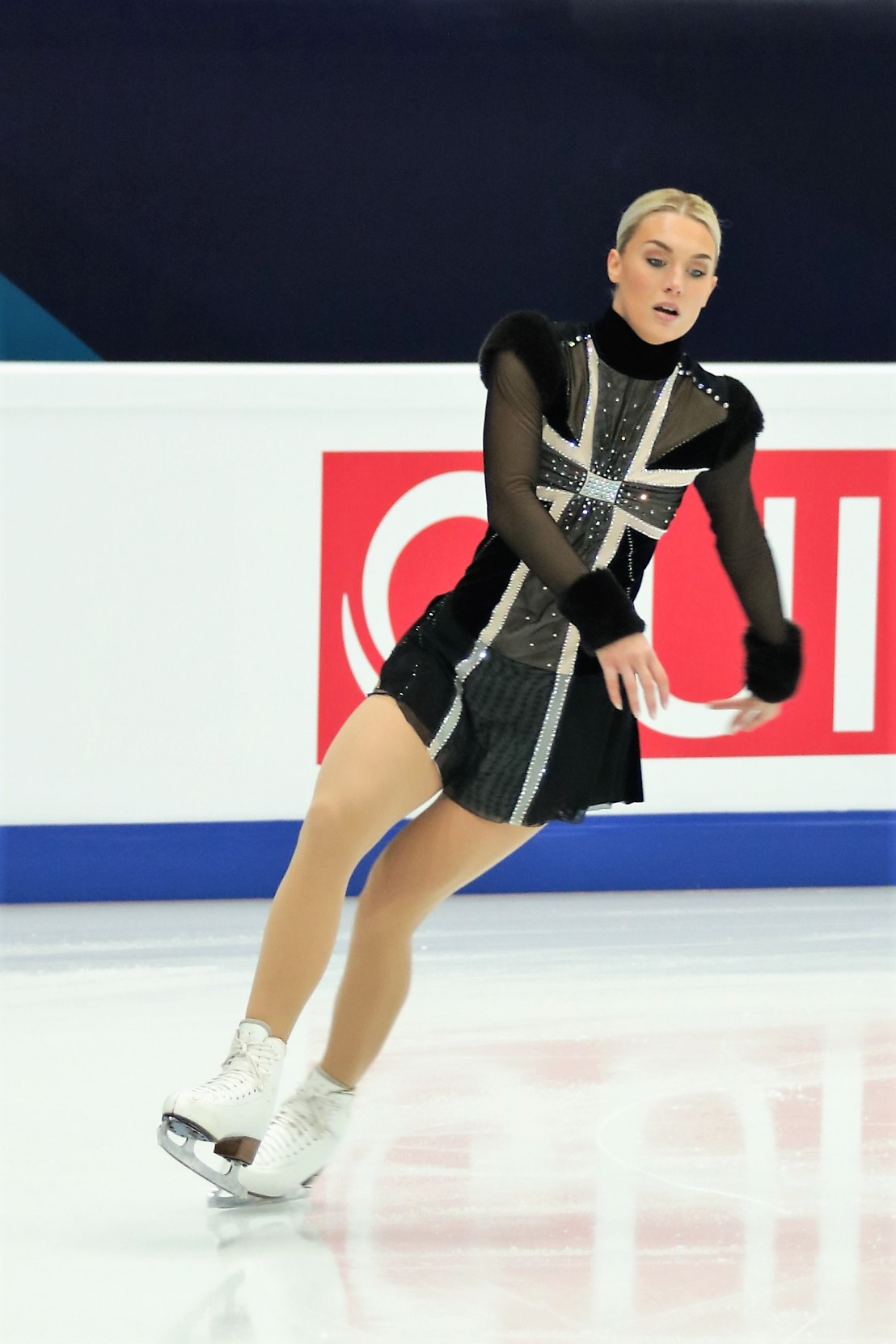
- Sørensen in 2018

Personal information
- Born: 20 February 1998 (age 28) Esbjerg, Denmark
- Height: 1.70 m (5 ft 7 in)

Figure skating career
- Country: Denmark
- Coach: Kalle Strid, Mikael Olofsson
- Skating club: Odense SC
- Began skating: 2001

Pernille Sørensen (born 20 February 1998) is a Danish figure skater. She is the 2014 Denkova-Staviski Cup champion, and a two-time Danish national champion (2015, 2018). She has competed in the final segment at two European Championships (2018, 2019) and the 2014 World Junior Championships.

== Personal life ==
Pernille Sørensen was born on 20 February 1998 in Esbjerg, Denmark. She is the daughter of Gitte and Peter Sørensen and has a brother, Nicki, who is five years younger.

== Career ==
Sørensen began skating in 2001. In 2010, she relocated with her family from Esbjerg to Odense, following three years of commuting to Odense for her training. Coached by Pernille Gormsen, she debuted on the ISU Junior Grand Prix series in 2011.

=== 2012–2013 season ===
Sørensen was coached in Odense by Andrzej Strzelec before switching to Alexei Fedoseev. She was assigned to the 2013 World Junior Championships in Milan, Italy but did not reach the free skate.

=== 2013–2014 season ===
Sørensen continued to train under Alexei Fedoseev in Odense. At the 2014 World Junior Championships in Sofia, Bulgaria, she qualified for the free skate and finished 18th overall.

=== 2014–2015 season ===
Sørensen made her senior international debut, at the 2014 International Cup of Nice, and became the Danish senior national champion for the first time. As of January 2015, she is coached by Kalle Strid and Martin Johansson in Copenhagen. She did not reach the final at the 2015 European Championships in Stockholm, Sweden, placing 27th in the short program. Sørensen placed 4th at the 2015 Nordic Championships in Stavanger, Norway. At the 2015 World Junior Championships she did not advance to the final.

=== 2015–2016 season ===
Sørensen reached her personal best score at the 2015 NRW Trophy, placing 4th. She was eliminated after the short program at the 2016 European Championships in Bratislava, Slovakia. On 12 February 2016, the Danish Skating Union announced that she had decided to stop her career.

=== 2017–2018 season ===
Sørensen returned to international competition in September 2017 at the Slovenia Open.

== Programs ==
Season	Short program	Free skating
2018–2019	A Night Like This by Caro Emerald choreo. by Kalle Strid	Pretty Woman by Roy Orbison; It Must Have Been Love by Roxette choreo. by Kalle Strid
2017–2018	Rock and Roll (Part 2) by Gary Glitter; Sparkling Diamonds (from Moulin Rouge!)	Life Must Have Its Mysteries (from Inferno) by Hans Zimmer; Archangel by Two Steps from Hell
2015–2016	Diamonds Are a Girl's Best Friend (from Moulin Rouge!)	Prince Igor by Alexander Borodin
2014–2015	L'Enfant Pur - Crystal Symphony by Maxime Rodriguez	Angels & Demons by Hans Zimmer, Joshua Bell
2013–2014	L'Enfant Pur - Crystal Symphony by Maxime Rodriguez	Dark Light by Howard Carter; Waltz by Dario Marianelli; Wrath of Sea by Two Steps from Hell
2012–2013	Ancient Egypt	Dark Light by Howard Carter; Rock Meets Rachmaninoff by Jon Schmidt, Steven Sharp Nelson; Rhapsody on a Theme of Paganini by Sergei Rachmaninoff
2011–2012	Ancient Egypt	House of Flying Daggers by Shigeru Umebayashi

== Competitive highlights ==
CS: Challenger Series; JGP: Junior Grand Prix

International
Event	11–12	12–13	13–14	14–15	15–16	17–18	18–19
Worlds							26th
Europeans				27th	34th	21st	23rd
CS Nebelhorn						22nd	
CS Tallinn Trophy							7th
CS Volvo Cup				12th			
Cup of Nice				8th		17th	
Denkova-Staviski				1st			
Halloween Cup							6th
Nordics				4th	WD		7th
NRW Trophy					4th		
Santa Claus Cup						11th	
Slovenia Open						10th	
Volvo Open Cup					9th		
International: Junior
Junior Worlds		35th	18th	39th	WD		
JGP Belarus			17th				
JGP Croatia		12th					
JGP Japan				21st			
JGP Latvia			14th				
JGP Romania	13th						
JGP U.S.		16th					
Merano Cup	13th						
New Year's Cup		2nd					
Nordics	6th	11th	5th				
Santa Claus Cup					2nd		
Warsaw Cup		3rd					
National
Danish Champ.	1st J	1st J	1st J	1st	WD	1st	1st
J = Junior level; WD = Withdrew
