= Anisette Torp-Lind =

Danish figure skater

Personal information
- Born: 20 May 1971 (age 55) Hørsholm, Denmark

Figure skating career
- Country: Denmark
- Retired: 1994

Anisette Torp-Lind (born 20 May 1971) is a Danish former competitive figure skater. She is the 1990 Skate Canada International interpretive bronze medalist, a three-time Nordic medalist, and a seven-time Danish national champion. She represented Denmark at the 1992 Winter Olympics in Albertville, placing 15th.

== Competitive highlights ==
International
Event	87–88	88–89	89–90	90–91	91–92	92–93	93–94
Olympics					15th		
Worlds	26th	24th	20th	16th	20th	20th	
Europeans	21st	15th		13th	17th	WD	24th
NHK Trophy					10th		
Skate Canada				8th	8th		
SC-Interpretive				3rd			
Nordics	3rd	2nd				2nd	
National
Danish Champ.	1st	1st	1st	1st	1st	1st	1st
WD: Withdrew
