= Denmark at the 2006 Winter Olympics =

- IOC code: DEN
- NOC: National Olympic Committee and Sports Confederation of Denmark
- Website: www.dif.dk (in Danish and English)

in Turin
- Competitors: 5 (5 women) in 1 sport
- Flag bearers: Dorthe Holm (opening); Daniel Mckay (non-athlete) (closing)
- Medals: Gold 0 Silver 0 Bronze 0 Total 0

Winter Olympics appearances (overview)
- 1948; 1952; 1956; 1960; 1964; 1968; 1972–1984; 1988; 1992; 1994; 1998; 2002; 2006; 2010; 2014; 2018; 2022; 2026

Denmark competed at the 2006 Winter Olympics in Turin, Italy, but only competed in one sport: women's curling. Denmark's only medal at the Winter Olympics came in women's curling in 1998.

== Curling ==
The Danish team consisted of the following five women: Denise Dupont, Dorthe Holm, Malene Krause, Lene Nielsen and Maria Poulsen.

=== Women's ===
Team: Dorthe Holm, Denise Dupont, Lene Nielsen, Malene Krause and Maria Poulsen (alternate)

Round Robin
Draw 1

Team	1	2	3	4	5	6	7	8	9	10	Final
Great Britain (Martin) 🔨	0	1	0	0	0	1	0	0	0	1	3
Denmark (Holm)	0	0	0	0	1	0	0	1	0	0	2

;Draw 3

Team	1	2	3	4	5	6	7	8	9	10	Final
Italy (Gaspari)	0	3	0	1	0	2	0	1	0	0	7
Denmark (Holm) 🔨	1	0	1	0	4	0	3	0	1	0	10

;Draw 4

Team	1	2	3	4	5	6	7	8	9	10	Final
Denmark (Holm)	0	0	1	0	0	2	0	0	0	0	3
United States (Johnson) 🔨	0	1	0	1	2	0	0	1	1	2	8

;Draw 5

Team	1	2	3	4	5	6	7	8	9	10	Final
Japan (Onodera)	0	1	2	1	0	0	0	1	0	0	5
Denmark (Holm) 🔨	1	0	0	0	3	2	0	0	2	1	9

;Draw 6

Team	1	2	3	4	5	6	7	8	9	10	Final
Denmark (Holm)	0	0	1	1	0	0	0	X	X	X	2
Switzerland (Ott) 🔨	0	3	0	0	1	3	3	X	X	X	10

;Draw 8

Team	1	2	3	4	5	6	7	8	9	10	Final
Sweden (Norberg)	0	2	0	0	2	2	4	0	X	X	10
Denmark (Holm) 🔨	1	0	3	0	0	0	0	1	X	X	5

;Draw 10

Team	1	2	3	4	5	6	7	8	9	10	Final
Russia (Privivkova) 🔨	1	1	0	2	1	0	1	2	0	1	9
Denmark (Holm)	0	0	2	0	0	2	0	0	3	0	7

;Draw 11

Team	1	2	3	4	5	6	7	8	9	10	Final
Denmark (Holm)	0	0	1	0	0	0	X	X	X	X	1
Norway (Nordby) 🔨	3	1	0	1	1	2	X	X	X	X	8

;Draw 12

Team	1	2	3	4	5	6	7	8	9	10	Final
Denmark (Holm) 🔨	2	0	3	0	0	0	1	0	2	0	8
Canada (Kleibrink)	0	3	0	3	0	1	0	1	0	1	9

Standings

Rank	Team	Skip	Won	Lost
1	Sweden	Anette Norberg	7	2
2	Switzerland	Mirjam Ott	7	2
3	Canada	Shannon Kleibrink	6	3
4	Norway	Dordi Nordby	6	3
5	Great Britain	Rhona Martin	5	4
6	Russia	Ludmila Privivkova	5	4
7	Japan	Ayumi Onodera	4	5
8	United States	Cassandra Johnson	2	7
9	Denmark	Dorthe Holm	2	7
10	Italy	Diana Gaspari	1	8
