= Lars Dresler =

Danish figure skater

Personal information
- Full name: Lars Gandrup Dresler
- Born: 2 January 1968 Gentofte, Denmark
- Died: 7 November 1995 (aged 27) Copenhagen, Denmark

Figure skating career
- Country: Denmark
- Coach: Lorna Brown
- Skating club: Gladsaxe Skøjteløber Forening
- Retired: c. 1990

Lars Gandrup Dresler (2 January 1968 – 7 November 1995) was a Danish figure skater. He was the 1990 Nordic champion and a five-time Danish national (1984–88). Dresler served as Denmark's flag bearer at the 1988 Winter Olympics in Calgary. He finished 14th overall after placing 14th in the compulsory figures, 12th in the short program, and 15th in the free skate. He trained at Gladsaxe Skøjteløber Forening. He was coached by Lorna Brown. He died in November 1995 of AIDS.

== Competitive highlights ==
Event	80–81	81–82	82–83	83–84	84–85	85–86	86–87	87–88	88–89	89–90
Winter Olympics								14th		
World Championships				23rd	24th	19th	16th	14th		23rd
European Championships				19th	14th	12th	18th		9th	16th
International de Paris									6th	9th
Nebelhorn Trophy								3rd		
Nordic Championships			2nd		2nd				3rd	1st
Skate America									4th	
World Junior Championships	13th	22nd	14th							
Danish Championships			2nd	1st	1st	1st	1st	1st	2nd	
