= Sophie Fjellvang-Sølling =

Danish freestyle skier (born 1981)

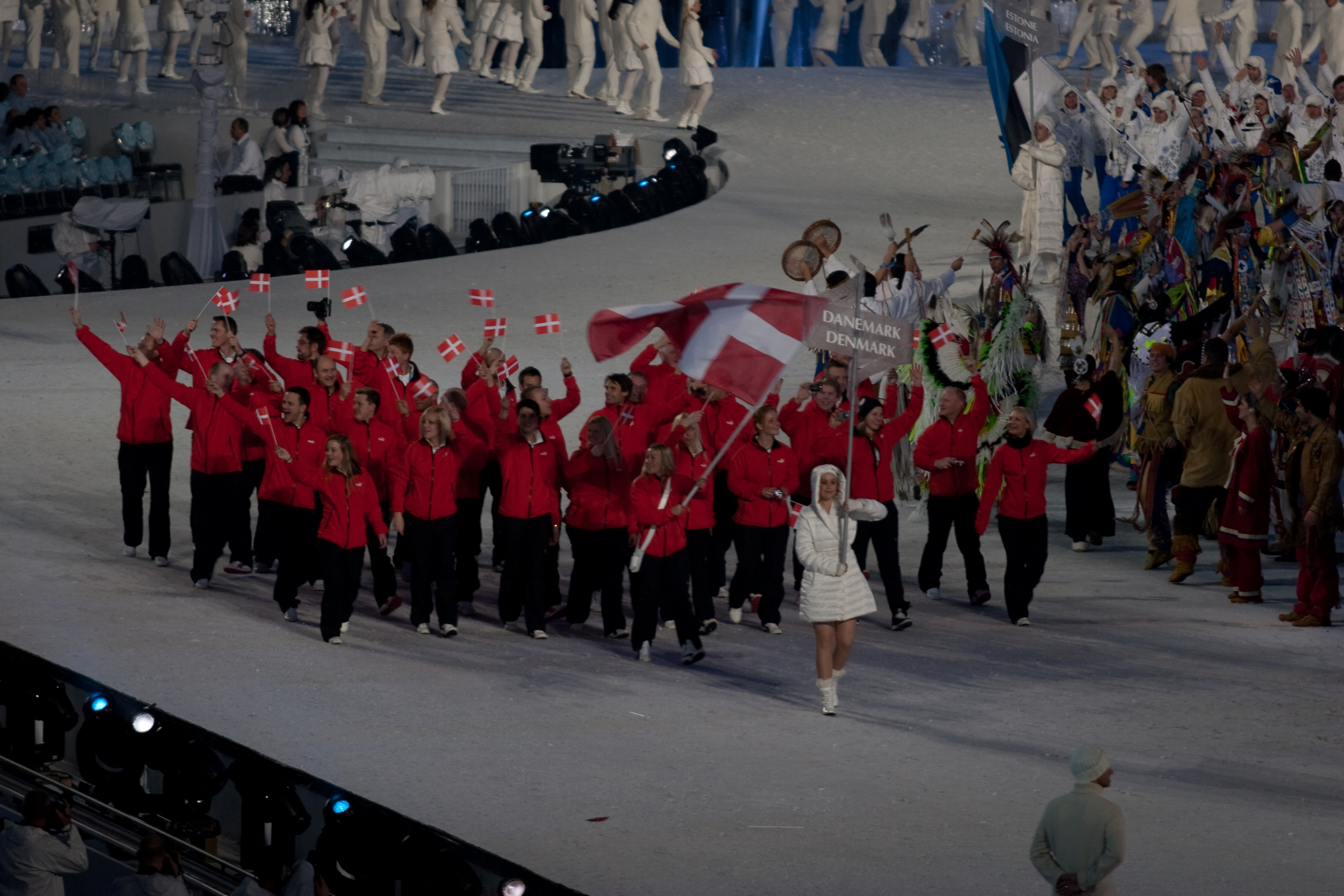

Sophie Fjellvang-Sølling (born 25 April 1981 in Hellerup) is a Danish freestyle skier. She competed for Denmark at the 2010 Winter Olympics in Women's ski cross. She was selected as her nation's flag bearer at the opening ceremonies.
