= Michael Tyllesen =

Danish figure skater

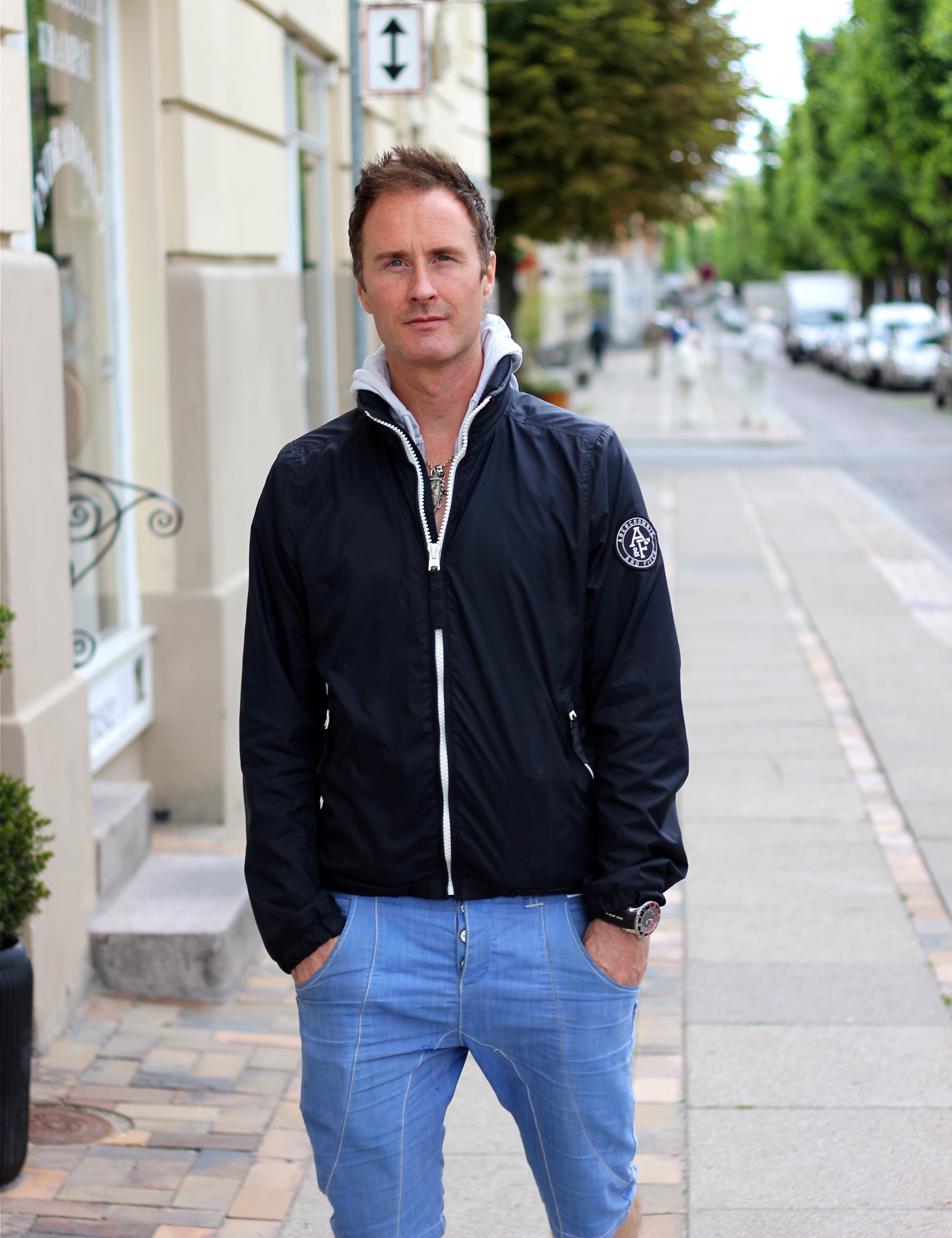

Personal information
- Full name: Michael Johannes Malmin Tyllesen
- Born: 27 August 1973 (age 53) Frederiksberg, Denmark
- Height: 1.86 m (6 ft 1 in)

Figure skating career
- Country: Denmark
- Skating club: Gladsaxe Sport Club
- Began skating: 1980
- Retired: 2000

Michael Johannes Malmin Tyllesen (born 27 August 1973) is a Danish former competitive figure skater. He is the 1997 Skate Canada International bronze medalist, a two-time Piruetten champion, and a two-time Nordic champion.

== Career ==
Tyllesen was a member of Gladsaxe Skøjteløber Forening. He also trained in Edmonton and Lake Arrowhead, California, and worked with choreographers Lorna Brown and Igor Bobrin.

Tyllesen's career-best ISU Championship result, sixth, came at the 1993 European Championships in Helsinki, Finland. He served as Denmark's flag bearer at the 1994 Winter Olympics in Lillehammer, Norway; he finished 13th after placing 13th in the short and 12th in the free skate.

Tyllesen finished ninth at the 1998 Winter Olympics in Nagano and 13th at the 1998 World Championships in Minneapolis.

After retiring from competition in 2000, Tyllesen performed in ice shows for nine years and then became a coach in Denmark. He is the head coach at Tårnby Skøjteklub.

== Programs ==
Season	Short program	Free skating
1999–2000		The Right Stuff by Bill Conti, London Symphony Orchestra

== Results ==
GP: Champions Series / Grand Prix

International
Event	90–91	91–92	92–93	93–94	94–95	95–96	96–97	97–98	98–99	99–00
Olympics				13th				9th		
Worlds		21st	17th	17th	25th	19th	18th	13th	29th	20th
Europeans			6th	8th	12th	17th	10th	9th	18th	12th
GP Cup of Russia							WD	11th	9th	
GP Skate Canada								3rd		
Nebelhorn Trophy							9th	4th		
Piruetten				8th			1st		1st	
Nordics	2nd		2nd		2nd	1st				1st
National
Danish Champ.	2nd	1st	1st	1st	2nd	1st	1st			1st
