= Johnny Albertsen =

Danish alpine skier (born 1977)

Johnny Albertsen (born 13 August 1977 in Gentofte) is an alpine skier from Denmark. He competed for Denmark at the 2010 Winter Olympics. His best result was a 40th place in the super-G.
