= Denmark at the 1964 Winter Olympics =

- IOC code: DEN
- NOC: Danish Olympic Committee

in Innsbruck
- Competitors: 2 in 2 sports
- Flag bearer: Svend Carlsen
- Medals: Gold 0 Silver 0 Bronze 0 Total 0

Winter Olympics appearances (overview)
- 1948; 1952; 1956; 1960; 1964; 1968; 1972–1984; 1988; 1992; 1994; 1998; 2002; 2006; 2010; 2014; 2018; 2022; 2026

Denmark sent a delegation to compete at the 1964 Winter Olympics in Innsbruck, Austria from 29 January to 9 February 1964. This was Denmark's fourth time participating in a Winter Olympic Games. The Danish delegation consisted of two athletes, cross-country skier Svend Carlsen and speed skater Kurt Stille. Carlsen placed outside the top 50 in both his events. Stille finished 9th in the men's 10,000 meters, the best performance by a Danish athlete at these Games.

== Background ==
Denmark has been part of the Olympic movement since the beginning, having sent three athletes to the first modern Olympics in 1896. Since then, the only Summer Olympic Games they have missed is the 1904 Summer Olympics. Denmark then first competed at the Winter Olympics at the 1948 Winter Olympics. Innsbruck was accordingly their fourth time participating in the Winter Olympics. The 1964 Winter Olympics were held from 29 January to 9 February 1964. The Danish delegation consisted of two athletes, cross-country skier Svend Carlsen and speed skater Kurt Stille. Carlsen was the flag bearer for the opening ceremony.

== Cross-country skiing ==
Svend Carlsen was 25 years old at the time of the Innsbruck Olympics, and was making his Olympic debut. Carlsen competed in two races, the 15 kilometer and the 30 kilometer, both of which were won by Eero Mäntyranta of Finland. On 30 January, he took part in the 30 kilometers race, finishing in 1 hour, 46 minutes and 35.9 seconds, which put him 53rd out of 66 who finished the race; the gold medal was won in 1 hour, 30 minutes and 50.7 seconds by Mäntyranta. The 15 kilometers race was held on 2 February. Carlsen completed the race in 1 hour and 20.7 seconds, which put him in 57th place out of 69 classified finishers. The gold medal was again won by Mäntyranta, this time in a time of 50 minutes and 54.1 seconds. Carlsen would return to compete in the same two races four years later, representing Denmark at the 1968 Winter Olympics.

Event	Athlete	Race	
Event	Athlete	Time	Rank
Men's 15 km	Svend Carlsen	1:00:20.7	57
Men's 30 km	Svend Carlsen	1:46:35.9	53

== Speed skating ==
Kurt Stille was 29 years old at the time of the Innsbruck Olympics, and was making his second Olympic appearance. He had previously represented Denmark at the 1960 Winter Olympics, skating the same three races in Squaw Valley he would skate here in Innsbruck. First for Stille was the men's 5000 meters, held on 5 February. He finished the race in a time of 7 minutes and 56.1 seconds, which put him 12th out of 42 competitors. Knut Johannesen of Norway won the gold medal in a time of 7 minutes and 38.4 seconds. The next day the men's 1500 meters was held, Stille finished in a time of 2 minutes and 17.4 seconds, which put him in 30th place; the gold medal was taken by Ants Antson of the Soviet Union in 2 minutes and 10.3 seconds. On 7 February, the men's 10,000 meters was held, and Stille had his best performance of the Games. He completed the race in 16 minutes and 38.3 seconds, which was sufficient for him to rank 9th out of 33 classified finishers. The gold medal was won in 15 minutes and 50.1 seconds by Jonny Nilsson of Sweden. Nonetheless, Stille's finish was Denmark's best at the Winter Olympics until their silver medal in women's curling at the 1998 Games.

Event	Athlete	Race	
Event	Athlete	Time	Rank
Men's 1500 m	Kurt Stille	2:17.4	30
Men's 5000 m	Kurt Stille	7:56.1	12
Men's 10,000 m	Kurt Stille	16:38.3	9
