= Denmark at the 1960 Winter Olympics =

- The flag of Denmark
- IOC code: DEN
- NOC: Danish Olympic Committee

in Squaw Valley
- Competitors: 1 (man) in 1 sport
- Medals: Gold 0 Silver 0 Bronze 0 Total 0

Winter Olympics appearances (overview)
- 1948; 1952; 1956; 1960; 1964; 1968; 1972–1984; 1988; 1992; 1994; 1998; 2002; 2006; 2010; 2014; 2018; 2022; 2026

Denmark sent a delegation to compete at the 1960 Winter Olympics in Squaw Valley, United States from 18–28 February 1960. This was Denmark's third time participating in a Winter Olympic Games. The only athlete the nation sent to these Games was speed skater Kurt Stille. He competed in the men's 1,500, 5,000, and 10,000 meter events, finishing 13th, 27th, and 17th respectively.

== Background ==
Denmark has been part of the Olympic movement since the beginning, having sent three athletes to the first modern Olympics in 1896. Since then, the only Summer Olympic Games they have missed is the 1904 Summer Olympics. Denmark then first competed at the Winter Olympics at the 1948 Winter Olympics. Squaw Valley was their third Winter Olympics appearance, having missed the 1956 Winter Olympics. The nation has won at least one medal at every Summer Olympics they have attended, but have won a Winter Olympics medal only once, in curling at the 1998 Winter Olympics. The 1960 Squaw Valley Winter Olympics were held from 18–28 February 1960; 665 athletes competed, representing 30 National Olympic Committees The only athlete Denmark sent to Squaw Valley was speed skater Kurt Stille.

== Speed skating ==
Kurt Stille was 25 years old at the time of the Squaw Valley Olympics, and was making his Olympic debut. On 25 February, he raced in the men's 5,000 meters; he finished the race in 8 minutes and 33 seconds, finishing in 27th place out of 37 competitors, and roughly 42 seconds behind the gold medalist Viktor Kosichkin of the Soviet Union. Silver was won by Knut Johannesen of Norway, nine seconds adrift of Kosichkin, and bronze by Jan Pesman of the Netherlands a further five seconds behind. The next day Stille fared better in the men's 1,500 m, finishing in 2 minutes and 15.8 seconds, which put him in 13th place out of 45 classified finishers. The joint gold medalists were Roald Aas of Norway and Yevgeny Grishin of the Soviet Union in a time of 2 minutes and 10.4 seconds, just 5.4 seconds ahead of Stille. Bronze was won by Boris Stenin, also of the Soviet Union in 2 minutes and 11.5 seconds On 27 February, Stille took part in his last race, the men's 10,000 m, where he finished in 17 minutes flat; this put him in 17th place out of 29 classified finishers and 1 minute and 14 seconds behind the gold medalist Johannesen of Norway. Silver was won by the Soviet Kosichkin, and bronze by Kjell Bäckman of Sweden. Stille would race exactly the same programme four years later for Denmark at the 1964 Winter Olympics, where his best performance was ninth in that year's 10,000 m.

Event	Athlete	Race	
Event	Athlete	Time	Rank
Men's 1,500 m	Kurt Stille	2:15.8	13
Men's 5,000 m	Kurt Stille	8:33.0	27
Men's 10,000 m	Kurt Stille	17:00.0	17

== See also ==
- Denmark at the 1960 Summer Olympics
