= Denmark at the 2014 Winter Olympics =

- IOC code: DEN
- NOC: National Olympic Committee and Sports Confederation of Denmark
- Website: www.dif.dk (in Danish and English)

in Sochi
- Competitors: 12 in 3 sports
- Flag bearers: Lene Nielsen (opening); Martin Møller (closing)
- Medals: Gold 0 Silver 0 Bronze 0 Total 0

Winter Olympics appearances (overview)
- 1948; 1952; 1956; 1960; 1964; 1968; 1972–1984; 1988; 1992; 1994; 1998; 2002; 2006; 2010; 2014; 2018; 2022; 2026; 2030

Denmark competed at the 2014 Winter Olympics in Sochi, Russia, from 7 to 23 February 2014. A team of 12 athletes in 3 sports are competing for the team. Their best placements were sixth in men's and women's curling.

== Alpine skiing ==
According to the quota allocation released on 20 January 2014, Denmark has qualified three athletes. However Denmark elected to send only one athlete who met the qualification set by the Olympic Committee.

Athlete	Event	Run 1		Run 2		Total	
Athlete	Event	Time	Rank	Time	Rank 1	Time	Rank
Christoffer Faarup	Men's downhill	—				2:12.55	37
Christoffer Faarup	Men's super-G	—				1:23.34	47
Christoffer Faarup	Men's combined	1:57.96	39	1:10.36	34	3:08.32	34

== Cross-country skiing ==
According to the quota allocation released on 20 January 2014, Denmark has qualified two athletes. However Denmark elected to only send one athlete, who met the qualification set by the Olympic Committee.

Distance

Athlete	Event	Classical		Freestyle		Final		
Athlete	Event	Time	Rank	Time	Rank	Time	Deficit	Rank
Martin Møller	Men's 15 km classical	—				43:29.7	+5:00.0	58
Martin Møller	Men's 30 km skiathlon	38:59.0	56	34:33.3	45	1:14:05.1	+5:49.7	52
Martin Møller	Men's 50 km freestyle	—				1:52:32.7	+5:37.5	45

Sprint

Athlete	Event	Qualification		Quarterfinal		Semifinal		Final	
Athlete	Event	Time	Rank	Time	Rank	Time	Rank	Time	Rank
Martin Møller	Men's sprint	3:44.38	54	did not advance					

== Curling ==
Based on results from 2012 and the 2013 World Curling Championships, Denmark has qualified their men's and women's team as one of the seven highest ranked nations. On 24 August 2013, the team selections were announced; all athletes who took part in the qualification were selected.

=== Men's tournament ===
Team: Rasmus Stjerne (skip), Mikkel Adrup Poulsen, Johnny Frederiksen, Troels Harry and Lars Vilandt (alternate).

Round robin

Final round robin standings
Team	Skip	Pld	W	L	PF	PA	EW	EL	BE	SE	S%	Qualification
Sweden	Niklas Edin	9	8	1	60	44	38	30	18	8	86%	Playoffs
Canada	Brad Jacobs	9	7	2	69	53	39	36	14	7	84%	Playoffs
China	Liu Rui	9	7	2	67	50	41	37	11	5	85%	Playoffs
Norway	Thomas Ulsrud	9	5	4	52	53	36	33	18	5	86%	Tiebreaker
Great Britain	David Murdoch	9	5	4	51	49	37	35	15	8	83%	Tiebreaker
Denmark	Rasmus Stjerne	9	4	5	54	61	32	37	17	4	81%	
Russia	Andrey Drozdov	9	3	6	58	70	36	38	13	7	77%	
Switzerland	Sven Michel	9	3	6	47	46	31	34	22	7	83%	
United States	John Shuster	9	2	7	47	58	30	39	14	7	80%	
Germany	John Jahr	9	1	8	53	74	38	39	10	9	76%	

Round-robin

Draw 1

Monday, 10 February, 9:00 am

Sheet C	1	2	3	4	5	6	7	8	9	10	Final
Denmark (Stjerne)	0	0	0	0	1	0	1	0	2	0	4
China (Liu)	0	2	1	0	0	0	0	3	0	1	7

Draw 2

Monday, 10 February, 7:00 pm

Sheet B	1	2	3	4	5	6	7	8	9	10	11	Final
Denmark (Stjerne)	0	0	2	0	3	0	2	0	3	0	1	11
Russia (Drozdov)	2	3	0	1	0	1	0	2	0	1	0	10

Draw 4

Wednesday, 12 February, 9:00 am

Sheet A	1	2	3	4	5	6	7	8	9	10	Final
Denmark (Stjerne)	3	0	0	0	0	0	0	0	2	0	5
United States (Shuster)	0	2	1	2	1	0	0	1	0	2	9

Draw 5

Wednesday, 12 February, 7:00 pm

Sheet D	1	2	3	4	5	6	7	8	9	10	Final
Denmark (Stjerne)	1	1	0	0	4	0	0	0	2	X	8
Sweden (Edin)	0	0	1	1	0	0	2	1	0	X	5

Draw 6

Thursday, 13 February, 2:00 pm

Sheet B	1	2	3	4	5	6	7	8	9	10	Final
Canada (Jacobs)	0	1	0	2	0	2	0	1	0	1	7
Denmark (Stjerne)	1	0	1	0	1	0	1	0	2	0	6

Draw 8

Friday, 14 February, 7:00 pm

Sheet A	1	2	3	4	5	6	7	8	9	10	Final
Great Britain (Murdoch)	0	0	0	1	0	3	0	2	1	1	8
Denmark (Stjerne)	0	2	1	0	2	0	1	0	0	0	6

Draw 9

Saturday, 15 February, 2:00 pm

Sheet B	1	2	3	4	5	6	7	8	9	10	Final
Denmark (Stjerne)	0	0	0	0	2	0	1	0	X	X	3
Switzerland (Michel)	4	0	0	0	0	2	0	3	X	X	9

Draw 11

Sunday, 16 February, 7:00 pm

Sheet C	1	2	3	4	5	6	7	8	9	10	Final
Germany (Jahr)	0	0	2	0	0	1	0	0	0	X	3
Denmark (Stjerne)	0	2	0	1	0	0	2	0	1	X	6

Draw 12

Monday, 17 February, 2:00 pm

Sheet D	1	2	3	4	5	6	7	8	9	10	Final
Norway (Ulsrud)	0	0	2	0	0	1	0	0	0	X	3
Denmark (Stjerne)	0	1	0	2	0	0	0	0	2	X	5

=== Women's tournament ===
Team: Lene Nielsen (skip), Helle Nordfred Simonsen, Jeanne Ellegaard, Maria Poulsen and Mette de Neergaard (alternate).

Round robin

Final round robin standings
Team	Skip	Pld	W	L	PF	PA	EW	EL	BE	SE	S%	Qualification
Canada	Jennifer Jones	9	9	0	72	40	43	27	12	14	86%	Playoffs
Sweden	Margaretha Sigfridsson	9	7	2	58	52	37	35	13	7	80%	Playoffs
Switzerland	Mirjam Ott	9	5	4	63	60	37	38	13	7	78%	Playoffs
Great Britain	Eve Muirhead	9	5	4	74	58	39	35	9	11	80%	Playoffs
Japan	Ayumi Ogasawara	9	4	5	59	67	39	41	4	10	76%	
Denmark	Lene Nielsen	9	4	5	57	56	34	40	12	9	78%	
China	Wang Bingyu	9	4	5	58	62	36	38	10	4	81%	
South Korea	Kim Ji-sun	9	3	6	60	65	35	37	10	6	79%	
Russia	Anna Sidorova	9	3	6	48	56	33	35	19	6	82%	
United States	Erika Brown	9	1	8	42	75	33	40	8	5	76%	

Round-robin

Draw 1

Monday, 10 February, 2:00 pm

Sheet D	1	2	3	4	5	6	7	8	9	10	Final
Russia (Sidorova)	0	0	1	2	1	0	0	0	2	1	7
Denmark (Nielsen)	0	1	0	0	0	1	1	1	0	0	4

Draw 2

Tuesday, 11 February, 9:00 am

Sheet A	1	2	3	4	5	6	7	8	9	10	Final
Switzerland (Ott)	1	0	2	0	0	2	0	1	0	1	7
Denmark (Nielsen)	0	1	0	2	0	0	1	0	2	0	6

Draw 3

Tuesday, 11 February, 7:00 pm

Sheet C	1	2	3	4	5	6	7	8	9	10	Final
Denmark (Nielsen)	0	0	0	0	1	0	2	0	X	X	3
Japan (Ogasawara)	1	1	2	1	0	1	0	2	X	X	8

Draw 5

Thursday, 13 February, 9:00 am

Sheet B	1	2	3	4	5	6	7	8	9	10	Final
Canada (Jones)	1	0	2	1	0	0	1	0	3	X	8
Denmark (Nielsen)	0	3	0	0	0	0	0	2	0	X	5

Draw 6

Thursday, 13 February, 7:00 pm

Sheet A	1	2	3	4	5	6	7	8	9	10	Final
Sweden (Sigfridsson)	0	0	2	0	1	0	2	0	1	1	7
Denmark (Nielsen)	0	2	0	2	0	1	0	1	0	0	6

Draw 7

Friday, 14 February, 2:00 pm

Sheet C	1	2	3	4	5	6	7	8	9	10	Final
United States (Brown)	0	0	1	0	1	0	0	0	X	X	2
Denmark (Nielsen)	0	2	0	2	0	2	2	1	X	X	9

Draw 9

Saturday, 15 February, 7:00 pm

Sheet D	1	2	3	4	5	6	7	8	9	10	Final
Denmark (Nielsen)	0	2	0	1	2	0	0	0	3	1	9
China (Wang)	2	0	2	0	0	1	0	1	0	0	6

Draw 10

Sunday, 16 February, 2:00 pm

Sheet A	1	2	3	4	5	6	7	8	9	10	Final
Denmark (Nielsen)	0	0	0	1	0	2	3	0	1	0	7
South Korea (Kim)	0	1	0	0	1	0	0	1	0	1	4

Draw 12

Monday, 17 February, 7:00 pm

Sheet B	1	2	3	4	5	6	7	8	9	10	11	Final
Denmark (Nielsen)	2	0	0	0	0	2	0	0	0	3	1	8
Great Britain (Muirhead)	0	0	1	2	0	0	3	1	0	0	0	7
