= Denmark at the 2002 Winter Olympics =

- IOC code: DEN
- NOC: National Olympic Committee and Sports Confederation of Denmark
- Website: www.dif.dk (in Danish and English)

in Salt Lake City
- Competitors: 11 (5 men, 6 women) in 2 sports
- Flag bearer: Ulrik Schmidt (curling)
- Medals: Gold 0 Silver 0 Bronze 0 Total 0

Winter Olympics appearances (overview)
- 1948; 1952; 1956; 1960; 1964; 1968; 1972–1984; 1988; 1992; 1994; 1998; 2002; 2006; 2010; 2014; 2018; 2022; 2026

Denmark competed at the 2002 Winter Olympics in Salt Lake City, United States.

== Curling ==
=== Men's tournament ===
==== Group stage ====
Top four teams advanced to semi-finals.

Country	Skip	W	L
Canada	Kevin Martin	8	1
Norway	Pål Trulsen	7	2
Switzerland	Andreas Schwaller	6	3
Sweden	Peja Lindholm	6	3
Finland	Markku Uusipaavalniemi	5	4
Germany	Sebastian Stock	4	5
Denmark 7th	Ulrik Schmidt	3	6
(United Kingdom) Great Britain	Hammy McMillan	3	6
United States	Tim Somerville	3	6
France	Dominique Dupont-Roc	0	9

Team 1	Score	Team 2
Denmark	3–9	Finland
Denmark	8–7	France
Denmark	6–10	Switzerland
Denmark	5–9	Sweden
Denmark	6–7	Germany
Norway	9–4	Denmark
United Kingdom	5–6	Denmark
United States	7–9	Denmark
Denmark	3–8	Canada

Contestants

Denmark
Hvidovre CC, Hvidovre

Skip: Ulrik Schmidt
Third: Lasse Lavrsen
Second: Brian Hansen
Lead: Carsten Svensgaard
Alternate: Frants Gufler

=== Women's tournament ===
==== Group stage ====
Top four teams advanced to semi-finals.

Country	Skip	W	L
Canada	Kelley Law	8	1
Switzerland	Luzia Ebnöther	7	2
United States	Kari Erickson	6	3
(United Kingdom) Great Britain	Rhona Martin	5	4
Germany	Natalie Neßler	5	4
Sweden	Elisabet Gustafson	5	4
Norway	Dordi Nordby	4	5
Japan	Akiko Katoh	2	7
Denmark 9th	Lene Bidstrup	2	7
Russia	Olga Jarkova	1	8

Team 1	Score	Team 2
Switzerland	9–8	Denmark
Denmark	5–9	Germany
Sweden	9–11	Denmark
Denmark	9–4	United States
Russia	7–5	Denmark
United Kingdom	8–6	Denmark
Canada	9–4	Denmark
Norway	9–4	Denmark
Denmark	5–6	Japan

Contestants

Denmark
Hvidovre CC, Hvidovre

Skip: Lene Bidstrup
Third: Susanne Slotsager
Second: Malene Krause
Lead: Avijaja Lund Nielsen
Alternate: Lisa Richardson

== Freestyle skiing ==
Women

Athlete	Event	Qualification			Final		
Athlete	Event	Time	Points	Rank	Time	Points	Rank
Anja Bolbjerg	Moguls	38.44	22.40	14 Q	DNF	DNF	–
