= Denmark at the 2010 Winter Olympics =

- IOC code: DEN
- NOC: National Olympic Committee and Sports Confederation of Denmark
- Website: www.dif.dk (in Danish and English)

in Vancouver
- Competitors: 18 in 7 sports
- Flag bearers: Sophie Fjellvang-Sølling (opening); Johnny Frederiksen (closing)
- Medals: Gold 0 Silver 0 Bronze 0 Total 0

Winter Olympics appearances (overview)
- 1948; 1952; 1956; 1960; 1964; 1968; 1972–1984; 1988; 1992; 1994; 1998; 2002; 2006; 2010; 2014; 2018; 2022; 2026

Denmark competed at the 2010 Winter Olympics in Vancouver, British Columbia, Canada. The highest result came in women's curling, where the Danish team finished fifth.

Denmark's only medal at the Winter Olympics came in women's curling in 1998.

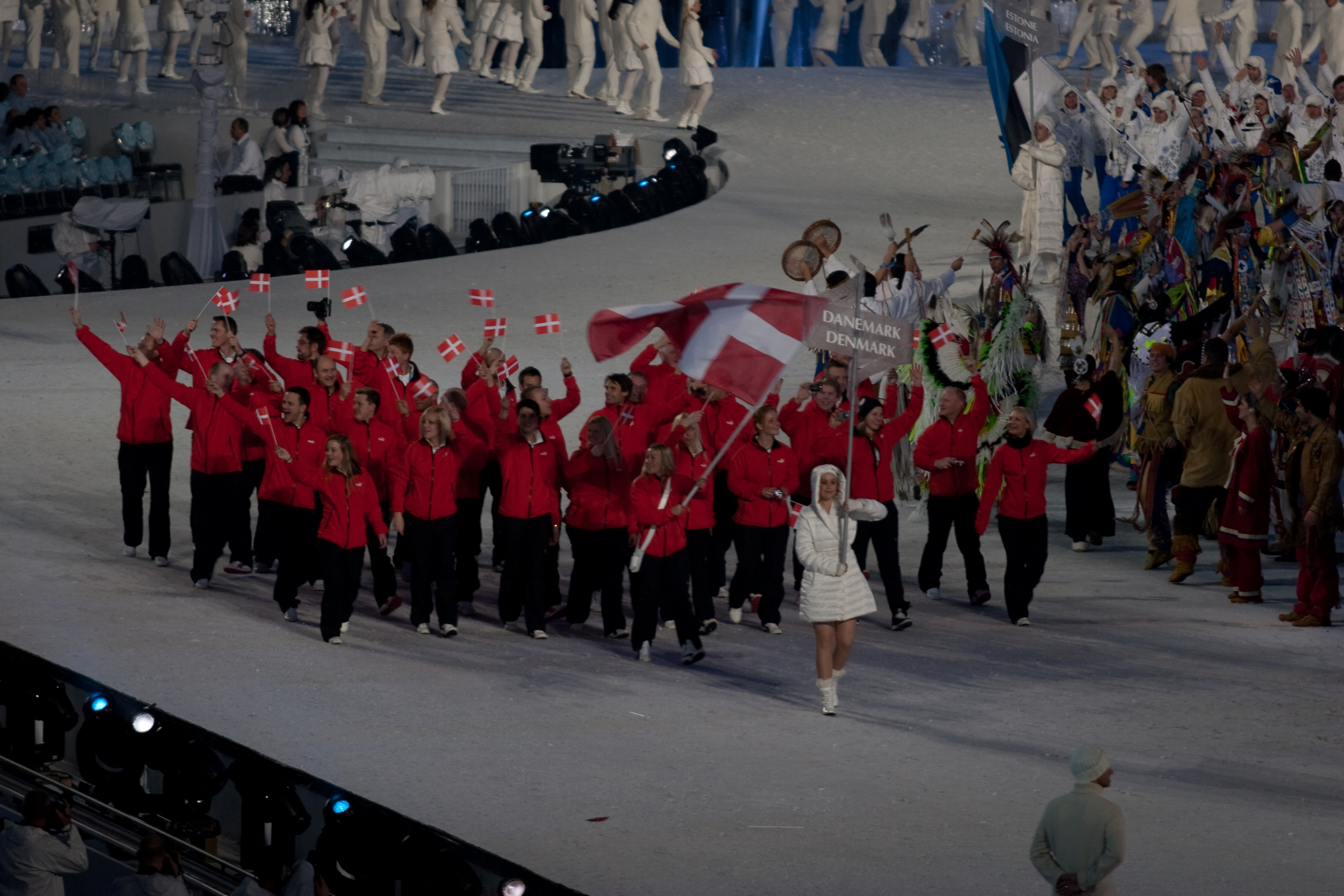
The athletes entering the stadium during the opening ceremonies.

== Alpine skiing ==
Men

Athlete	Event	Run 1		Run 2		Total	Rank
Athlete	Event	Time	Rank	Time	Rank	Time	Rank
Johnny Albertsen	Downhill	2:00.12	53	—		2:00.12	53
Johnny Albertsen	Super-G	1:35.69	40	—		1:35.69	40
Markus Kilsgaard	Giant slalom	DSQ		DNS		—	
Markus Kilsgaard	Slalom	DNS					

Kilsgaard originally finished his first run in 1:26.32 ranked 66th, but was disqualified after his skies were found not to conform with rule B2.1.2, regarding the distance between the ski boot sole and the running surface of the ski.

Women

Athlete	Event	Run 1		Run 2		Total	Rank
Athlete	Event	Time	Rank	Time	Rank	Time	Rank
Yina Moe-Lange	Giant slalom	1:24.68	58	1:18.99	47	2:43.67	47
Yina Moe-Lange	Slalom	1:02.75	66	1:01.95	51	2:04.70	52

== Biathlon ==
Men

Athlete	Event	Time (misses)	Rank
Øystein Slettemark	10 km sprint	30:55.8 (3+4)	86
Øystein Slettemark	12.5 km pursuit	DNQ	
Øystein Slettemark	20 km individual	1:01:12.9 (2+1+2+3)	88

Slettemark competes for Greenland on the World Cup, but since Greenland does not have an NOC, he competes for Denmark during the Olympics.

== Cross-country skiing ==
Men

Athlete	Event	Time	Rank
Jonas Thor Olsen	15 km freestyle	39:01.8	76
Jonas Thor Olsen	30 km pursuit	Lapped	55
Jonas Thor Olsen	50 km classical	2:25:00.9	48

== Curling ==
=== Men's tournament ===
Team: Ulrik Schmidt (skip), Johnny Frederiksen, Bo Jensen, Lars Vilandt and Mikkel Poulsen (alternate).

Standings

Final round robin standings
Team	Skip	Pld	W	L	PF	PA	EW	EL	BE	SE	S%	Qualification
Canada	Kevin Martin	9	9	0	75	36	36	28	14	2	85%	Playoffs
Norway	Thomas Ulsrud	9	7	2	64	43	40	32	15	7	84%	Playoffs
Switzerland	Ralph Stöckli	9	6	3	53	44	35	33	20	8	81%	Playoffs
Sweden	Niklas Edin	9	5	4	50	52	34	36	20	6	82%	Tiebreaker
Great Britain	David Murdoch	9	5	4	57	44	35	29	20	9	81%	Tiebreaker
Germany	Andy Kapp	9	4	5	48	60	35	38	11	9	75%	
France	Thomas Dufour	9	3	6	37	63	22	34	16	7	73%	
China	Wang Fengchun	9	2	7	52	60	37	37	9	7	77%	
Denmark	Ulrik Schmidt	9	2	7	45	63	31	29	12	6	78%	
United States	John Shuster	9	2	7	43	59	32	41	18	9	76%	

Matches

Draw 1 16 Feb 9:00 PST Archived 2010-02-15 at the Wayback Machine

Sheet D	1	2	3	4	5	6	7	8	9	10	Final
Switzerland (Stöckli)	0	0	0	1	1	0	4	0	0	0	6
Denmark (Schmidt)	0	0	0	0	0	1	0	2	1	1	5

Draw 3 17 Feb 14:00 PST Archived 2010-04-08 at the Wayback Machine

Sheet C	1	2	3	4	5	6	7	8	9	10	Final
Denmark (Schmidt)	0	1	0	0	0	0	0	x	x	x	1
China (Wang)	1	0	3	2	1	0	1	x	x	x	8

Draw 4 18 Feb 9:00 PST Archived 2010-02-18 at the Wayback Machine

Sheet A	1	2	3	4	5	6	7	8	9	10	11	Final
Denmark (Schmidt)	0	2	0	1	0	0	1	1	0	1	1	7
United States (Shuster)	1	0	2	0	0	2	0	0	1	0	0	6

Draw 5 18 Feb 19:00 PST Archived 2010-02-18 at the Wayback Machine

Sheet B	1	2	3	4	5	6	7	8	9	10	Final
Great Britain (Murdoch)	0	0	2	0	1	0	0	3	0	3	9
Denmark (Schmidt)	0	1	0	1	0	2	0	0	2	0	6

Draw 6 19 Feb 14:00 PST Archived 2010-02-15 at the Wayback Machine

Sheet B	1	2	3	4	5	6	7	8	9	10	Final
Denmark (Schmidt)	1	0	1	0	1	0	x	x	x	x	3
Canada (Martin)	0	2	0	5	0	3	x	x	x	x	10

Draw 7 20 Feb 9:00 PST Archived 2010-02-21 at the Wayback Machine

Sheet A	1	2	3	4	5	6	7	8	9	10	Final
Norway (Ulsrud)	0	1	0	2	0	0	0	3	0	x	6
Denmark (Schmidt)	0	0	1	0	1	0	0	0	1	x	3

Draw 9 21 Feb 14:00 PST Archived 2010-02-21 at the Wayback Machine

Sheet D	1	2	3	4	5	6	7	8	9	10	Final
Denmark (Schmidt)	1	0	0	4	1	0	2	0	1	x	9
Germany (Kapp)	0	2	0	0	0	2	0	1	0	x	5

Draw 11 22 Feb 19:00 PST Archived 2010-02-22 at the Wayback Machine

Sheet C	1	2	3	4	5	6	7	8	9	10	11	Final
France (Dufour)	1	1	0	2	0	0	0	0	1	0	1	6
Denmark (Schmidt)	0	0	1	0	3	0	0	0	0	1	0	5

Draw 12 23 Feb 14:00 PST Archived 2010-02-14 at the Wayback Machine

Sheet B	1	2	3	4	5	6	7	8	9	10	Final
Sweden (Edin)	3	0	2	1	0	0	0	0	0	1	7
Denmark (Schmidt)	0	1	0	0	2	1	1	0	1	0	6

=== Women's tournament ===
Team: Angelina Jensen, Madeleine Dupont, Denise Dupont, Camilla Jensen and Ane Håkansson Hansen (alternate).

Standings

Final round robin standings
Team	Skip	Pld	W	L	PF	PA	EW	EL	BE	SE	S%	Qualification
Canada	Cheryl Bernard	9	8	1	56	37	40	29	20	13	81%	Playoffs
Sweden	Anette Norberg	9	7	2	56	52	36	36	13	5	79%	Playoffs
China	Wang Bingyu	9	6	3	61	47	39	37	12	7	74%	Playoffs
Switzerland	Mirjam Ott	9	6	3	67	48	40	36	7	12	76%	Playoffs
Denmark	Angelina Jensen	9	4	5	49	61	31	40	15	5	74%	
Germany	Andrea Schöpp	9	3	6	52	56	35	40	15	4	75%	
Great Britain	Eve Muirhead	9	3	6	54	59	36	41	11	10	75%	
Japan	Moe Meguro	9	3	6	64	70	36	37	13	5	73%	
Russia	Liudmila Privivkova	9	3	6	53	60	36	40	14	13	77%	
United States	Debbie McCormick	9	2	7	43	65	36	36	12	12	77%	

Matches

Draw 1 16 Feb 14:00 PST Archived 2010-05-06 at the Wayback Machine

Sheet B	1	2	3	4	5	6	7	8	9	10	Final
Denmark (Jensen)	0	0	2	0	1	0	0	2	0	0	5
Sweden (Norberg)	0	0	0	1	0	2	0	0	2	1	6

Draw 3 17 Feb 19:00 PST Archived 2010-02-14 at the Wayback Machine

Sheet A	1	2	3	4	5	6	7	8	9	10	Final
Russia (Privivkova)	0	0	1	0	0	2	0	1	1	2	7
Denmark (Jensen)	0	0	0	2	0	0	1	0	0	0	3

Draw 4 18 Feb 14:00 PST Archived 2010-02-18 at the Wayback Machine

Sheet D	1	2	3	4	5	6	7	8	9	10	Final
Denmark (Jensen)	1	1	0	0	0	1	3	0	1	0	7
United States (McCormick)	0	0	2	1	1	0	0	1	0	1	6

Draw 5 19 Feb 9:00 PST Archived 2010-02-15 at the Wayback Machine

Sheet C	1	2	3	4	5	6	7	8	9	10	Final
China (Wang)	1	2	1	2	0	5	x	x	x	x	11
Denmark (Jensen)	0	0	0	0	1	0	x	x	x	x	1

Draw 6 19 Feb 19:00 PST Archived 2010-02-14 at the Wayback Machine

Sheet A	1	2	3	4	5	6	7	8	9	10	11	Final
Denmark (Jensen)	0	1	0	0	0	2	0	0	0	1	0	4
Canada (Bernard)	1	0	0	1	0	0	0	1	1	0	1	5

Draw 7 20 Feb 14:00 PST Archived 2010-02-23 at the Wayback Machine

Sheet C	1	2	3	4	5	6	7	8	9	10	Final
Denmark (Jensen)	2	1	0	2	0	0	1	1	0	0	7
Switzerland (Ott)	0	0	2	0	2	1	0	0	2	1	8

Draw 8 21 Feb 9:00 PST Archived 2010-02-21 at the Wayback Machine

Sheet B	1	2	3	4	5	6	7	8	9	10	Final
Germany (Schöpp)	0	0	1	0	0	0	1	0	3	0	5
Denmark (Jensen)	0	3	0	0	0	1	0	1	0	1	6

Draw 10 22 Feb 14:00 PST Archived 2010-02-15 at the Wayback Machine

Sheet D	1	2	3	4	5	6	7	8	9	10	Final
Great Britain (Muirhead)	0	3	0	2	0	1	0	1	0	1	8
Denmark (Jensen)	1	0	2	0	1	0	3	0	2	0	9

Draw 12 23 Feb 19:00 PST Archived 2010-02-15 at the Wayback Machine

Sheet C	1	2	3	4	5	6	7	8	9	10	Final
Japan (Meguro)	0	0	0	2	0	2	0	0	1	x	5
Denmark (Jensen)	0	0	3	0	1	0	0	3	0	x	7

== Freestyle skiing ==
Women

Athlete	Event	Qualification		1/8 Finals	Quarterfinals	Semifinals	Final	Rank
Athlete	Event	Time	Rank	Rank	Rank	Rank	Rank	Rank
Sophie Fjellvang-Sølling	Ski cross	1:20.41	20	3	DNQ	DNQ	DNQ	21

== Snowboarding ==
Women

Athlete	Event	Qualification			Quarterfinals	Semifinals	Final	Rank
Athlete	Event	Run 1	Run 2	Rank	Rank	Rank	Rank	Rank
Julie Lundholdt	Snowboard cross	1:31.29	1:44.62	15	4	DNQ	DNQ	15

== Speed skating ==
Women

Athlete	Event	Time	Rank
Cathrine Grage	3000 m	4:20.93	27
Cathrine Grage	5000 m	7:23.83	14

== See also ==
- Denmark at the 2010 Winter Paralympics
