= Martin Møller =

Danish cross-country skier (born 1980)

Personal information
- Nationality: Greenlandic
- Born: 18 May 1980 (age 46) Næstved, Denmark
- Height: 1.85 m (6 ft 1 in)
- Weight: 78 kg (172 lb)

Sport
- Country: Denmark
- Sport: Cross-country skiing
- Club: NSP
- Turned pro: 1999

Martin Møller (born 18 May 1980 in Næstved, Denmark) is a Danish cross-country skier from Greenland. He competed for Denmark at the 2014 Winter Olympics in the cross-country skiing events. He is a past winner of Greenland's Arctic Circle Race.
