= Henrik Walentin =

Danish figure skater

Personal information
- Born: 22 August 1967 (age 58) Glostrup, Denmark

Figure skating career
- Country: Denmark
- Retired: 1994

Henrik Walentin (born 22 August 1967) is a Danish former competitive figure skater. He is the 1991 Karl Schäfer Memorial bronze medalist, a five-time Nordic champion, and a three-time Danish national champion. Walentin placed tenth at the 1992 European Championships in Lausanne and was selected to represent Denmark at the 1992 Winter Olympics in Albertville, where he finished 22nd.

== Competitive highlights ==
International
Event	83–84	84–85	85–86	86–87	87–88	88–89	89–90	90–91	91–92	92–93	93–94
Olympics									22nd		
Worlds						20th		25th			
Europeans					19th		14th	15th	10th	11th	WD
Karl Schäfer									3rd		
Prague Skate				2nd							
Nordics	1st	3rd	3rd	1st	2nd	2nd	2nd	1st	1st	1st	
International: Junior
Jr. Worlds	10th										
National
Danish						1st	1st	1st			
WD: Withdrew
