= Per Cock-Clausen =

Danish figure skater

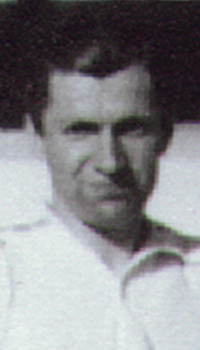

Personal information
- Born: 23 September 1912 Frederiksberg, Denmark
- Died: 11 August 2002 (aged 89)

Figure skating career
- Country: Denmark

Per Cock-Clausen (23 September 1912 – 11 August 2002) was a Danish figure skater. He was born in Frederiksberg, Denmark. He was the 13-time Danish National Champion from 1940 to 1963 (held intermittently) and Nordic Champion from 1949 to 1951 and in 1953. He competed at both the 1948 and 1952 Winter Olympic Games finishing 16th and 14th, respectively. He was the son of architect Alf Cock-Clausen. After his competitive career, he became a member of the Copenhagen City Council as a member of the Conservative People's Party.

== Results ==
Event	1938	1939	1940	1941	1942	1943	1944	1945	1946	1947	1948	1949	1950	1951	1952	1953	1954	1955	1956	1957	1958	1959	1960	1961	1962	1963
Winter Olympic Games											16th				14th											
World Championships	10th	9th								5th	13th	9th	7th													
European Championships	9th	10th											9th													
Nordic Championships									2nd			1st	1st	1st		2nd	1st	2nd	3rd	3rd	2nd					
Danish Championships			1st	1st	1st				1st	1st	1st						1st	1st	1st				1st	1st	1st	1st
