= Essent Cup 2006–07 =

The 2006–07 Essent Cup of marathon speed skating was held in the Netherlands, between 7 October 2006 and 3 March 2007.

== Men's results ==
Date	Venue	Winner	Second	Third
1 October	Utrecht	(Netherlands) Peter Baars	(Switzerland) Alain Gloor	(Netherlands) Lars Hoogenboom
14 October	Alkmaar	(Netherlands) Arjan Smit	(France) Cédric Michaud	(Netherlands) Douwe de Vries
21 October	Eindhoven	(Netherlands) Ingmar Berga	(Netherlands) Henk Angenent	(Netherlands) Bob de Vries
28 October	Amsterdam	(Netherlands) Jan Maarten Heideman	(Netherlands) Arjan Stroetinga	(France) Cédric Michaud
4 November	Eindhoven	(Netherlands) Jan Maarten Heideman	(France) Cédric Michaud	(Netherlands) Ingmar Berga
11 November	Amsterdam	(Netherlands) Jan Maarten Heideman	(France) Cédric Michaud	(Netherlands) Douwe de Vries
18 November	Assen	(Netherlands) Jan Maarten Heideman	(France) Cédric Michaud	(Netherlands) Arjan Stroetinga
25 November	The Hague	(Netherlands) Arjan Smit	(Netherlands) Andrès Landman	(Netherlands) Youri Lissenberg
2 December	Assen	(Netherlands) Jan Maarten Heideman	(Netherlands) Douwe de Vries	(Netherlands) Ingmar Berga
9 December	Heerenveen	(Netherlands) Henk Angenent	(Netherlands) Bertjan van der Veen	(Netherlands) Joost Juffermans
23 December	Amsterdam	(Netherlands) Geert Plender	(Netherlands) Henk Angenent	(France) Tristan Loy
30 December	Assen	(Netherlands) Arjan Stroetinga	(Netherlands) Douwe de Vries	(Netherlands) Bob de Vries
10 February	Amsterdam	(Netherlands) Miel Rozendaal	(Netherlands) Henk Angenent	(France) Tristan Loy
17 February	Alkmaar	(Netherlands) Miel Rozendaal	(Netherlands) Sjoerd Huisman	(Netherlands) Bob de Vries
24 February	Eindhoven	(France) Tristan Loy	(Netherlands) Martijn van Es	(Netherlands) Casper Helling
3 March	Assen	(Netherlands) Jan Maarten Heideman	(France) Cédric Michaud	(Netherlands) Yoeri Lissenberg

=== Final rankings ===
Pos.	Skater	Nation	Points
1.	Jan Maarten Heideman	Netherlands	86
2.	Cédric Michaud	France	62
3.	Douwe de Vries	Netherlands	45
4.	Ingmar Berga	Netherlands	45
5.	Henk Angenent	Netherlands	43
6.	Arjan Smit	Netherlands	32
7.	Bob de Vries	Netherlands	31
8.	Arjan Stroetinga	Netherlands	30
9.	Tristan Loy	France	24
10.	René Ruitenberg	Netherlands	23

== Women's results ==
Date	Venue	Winner	Second	Third
1 October	Utrecht	(Netherlands) Foske Tamar van der Wal	(Netherlands) Daniëlle Bekkering	(Netherlands) Maria Sterk
14 October	Alkmaar	(Netherlands) Elma de Vries	(Netherlands) Maria Sterk	(Netherlands) Helen van Goozen
21 October	Eindhoven	(Netherlands) Daniëlle Bekkering	(Netherlands) Mariska Huisman	(Netherlands) Helen van Goozen
28 October	Amsterdam	(Netherlands) Elma de Vries	(Netherlands) Mariska Huisman	(Netherlands) Helen van Goozen
4 November	Eindhoven	(Netherlands) Daniëlle Bekkering	(Netherlands) Helen van Goozen	(Netherlands) Maria Sterk
11 November	Amsterdam	(Netherlands) Daniëlle Bekkering	(Netherlands) Gretha Smit	(Netherlands) Mireille Reitsma
18 November	Assen	(Netherlands) Daniëlle Bekkering	(Netherlands) Elma de Vries	(Netherlands) Helen van Goozen
25 November	The Hague	(Netherlands) Elma de Vries	(Netherlands) Helen van Goozen	(Netherlands) Daniëlle Bekkering
2 December	Assen	(Netherlands) Elma de Vries	(Netherlands) Jolanda Langeland	(Netherlands) Mischa Top
9 December	Heerenveen	(Netherlands) Daniëlle Bekkering	(Netherlands) Elma de Vries	(Germany) Friederike Sagurna
23 December	Amsterdam	(Netherlands) Foske Tamar van der Wal	(Netherlands) Elma de Vries	(Netherlands) Helen van Goozen
30 December	Assen	(Netherlands) Elma de Vries	(Netherlands) Mireille Reitsma	(Netherlands) Daniëlle Bekkering
10 February	Amsterdam	(Netherlands) Mireille Reitsma	(Netherlands) Daniëlle Bekkering	(Netherlands) Elma de Vries
17 February	Alkmaar	(Netherlands) Elma de Vries	(Netherlands) Daniëlle Bekkering	(Netherlands) Helen van Goozen
24 February	Eindhoven	(Netherlands) Kitty Meeth	(Netherlands) Carla Zielman	(Netherlands) Karin Maarse
3 March	Assen	(Netherlands) Daniëlle Bekkering	(Netherlands) Maria Sterk	(Netherlands) Andrea Sikkema

=== Final rankings ===
Pos.	Skater	Nation	Points
1.	Daniëlle Bekkering	Netherlands	345,6
2.	Elma de Vries	Netherlands	291,6
3.	Maria Sterk	Netherlands	277
4.	Helen van Goozen	Netherlands	273
5.	Andrea Sikkema	Netherlands	200
6.	Mariska Huisman	Netherlands	197
7.	Jolanda Langeland	Netherlands	160
8.	Mischa Top	Netherlands	147
9.	Friederike Sagurna	Germany	134
10.	Mireille Reitsma	Netherlands	126,1
