= Ice skating marathon =

Long distance speed skating race

Ice skating marathons are long distance speed skating races which may be held on natural ice on canals, and bodies of water such as lakes and rivers. Marathon is a discipline of speed skating, which is founded in The Netherlands. The races concern speed skating by at least five skaters who start all together on an ice rink with a minimum length of 333.33 meters or on a track:

- Minimum distance longer than 6.4 kilometers and up to 200 kilometers for skaters who have reached the age of 17 prior to the skating season on July 1.
- Minimum distance longer than 4 kilometers and up to 20 kilometers for skaters who have reached the age of or the age of 13, but have not yet reached the age of 17 before July 1 preceding the skating season.
- Minimum distance of 2 kilometers and up to 10 kilometers for skaters who have not yet reached the age of 13 before July 1 preceding the skating season.

Most famous race is the Elfstedentocht (Eleven Cities) ice skating marathon (200 kilometers) on frozen canals in The Netherlands.

Marathon Ice Speed Skaters Erik Jan Kooiman and Carien Kleibeuker currently possess the world hour record men (43,735.94 meters) and ladies (40,569.68 meters).

== Notable marathon speedskaters ==
- Jorrit Bergsma (Netherlands)
- K. C. Boutiette (United States)
- Fabio Francolini (Italy)
- Jan Maarten Heideman (Netherlands)
- Mariska Huisman (Netherlands)
- Sjoerd Huisman (Netherlands)
- Erik Jan Kooiman (Netherlands)
- Francesca Lollobrigida (Italy)
- Tristan Loy (France)
- Fausto Marreiros (Portugal)
- Cédric Michaud (France)
- Irene Schouten (Netherlands)
- Arjan Stroetinga (Netherlands)
- Bart Swings (Belgium)
- Bob de Vries (Netherlands)
- Chris Witty (United States)

== See also ==
- KNSB Dutch Marathon Championships
