= Denmark at the 1968 Winter Olympics =

- The flag of Denmark
- IOC code: DEN (DAN used at these Games)
- NOC: Danish Olympic Committee

in Grenoble
- Competitors: 3 (2 men, 1 woman) in 1 sport
- Flag bearer: Kirsten Carlsen
- Medals: Gold 0 Silver 0 Bronze 0 Total 0

Winter Olympics appearances (overview)
- 1948; 1952; 1956; 1960; 1964; 1968; 1972–1984; 1988; 1992; 1994; 1998; 2002; 2006; 2010; 2014; 2018; 2022; 2026

Denmark sent a delegation to compete at the 1968 Winter Olympics in Grenoble, France from 6–18 February 1968. This was Denmark's fifth time participating in the Winter Olympic Games. The delegation consisted of three cross-country skiers; Apollo Lynge, Kirsten Carlsen, and Svend Carlsen. The men both competed in the 15 and 30 km races; Kirsten Carlsen competed in the 5 km and 10 km races. She had the best performance of any of them with her 32nd-place finish in the 10 km event.

== Background ==
Denmark has been part of the Olympic movement since the beginning, having sent three athletes to the first modern Olympics in 1896. Since then, the only Summer Olympic Games they have missed is the 1904 Summer Olympics. Denmark first competed at the Winter Olympics at the 1948 Winter Olympics. Grenoble was accordingly their fifth time participating in the Winter Olympics. Denmark has won at least one medal in every Summer Olympics they have participated in, but won a medal in the Winter Olympics only once, in 1998 at Nagano in the sport of curling. The 1968 Winter Olympics were held from 6–18 February 1968; a total of 1,158 athletes competed representing 37 National Olympic Committees. The Danish delegation to Grenoble consisted of three cross-country skiers; Apollo Lynge, Kirsten Carlsen, and Svend Carlsen. Kirsten Carlsen was the flagbearer for the opening ceremony. The two Carlsens' were husband and wife.

== Cross-country skiing ==
Apollo Lynge was 28 years old at the time of the Grenoble Games, and was making his only Olympic appearance. Svend Carlsen was 29 years of age, and was making his second appearance at an Olympics, having skied the same two races four years earlier for Denmark at the 1964 Winter Olympics The two men raced the same programme, the 30 kilometers on 7 February, and the 15 kilometers on 10 February. In the 30 kilometers race, Lynge finished in 1 hour, 55 minutes, and 40.0 seconds; Carlsen did better, finishing in 1 hour, 50 minutes and 51.8 seconds. Out of 63 classified finishers Lynge was in 62nd place and Carlsen in 53rd. The gold medal was won by Franco Nones of Italy in 1 hour, 35 minutes and 39.2 seconds; silver was won by Odd Martinsen of Norway, and bronze was taken by Eero Mäntyranta of Finland. In the 15 kilometers race, their fortunes were similar. Lynge finished in 1 hour and 34.8 seconds, which placed him 67th out of 72 competitors who finished the race, while Carlsen's time was a faster 56 minutes and 9.5 seconds, good for 57th place. Carlsen's 57th- and 53rd-place finishes were identical to his ranks in the same races four years before. The gold medal was won by Harald Grønningen of Norway in a time of 47 minutes and 54.2 seconds, the silver was won by Mäntyranta and the bronze by Gunnar Larsson of Sweden.

Kirsten Carlsen, at 30 years old was the oldest member of the delegation, and also making her only Olympic appearance. On 9 February, she participated in the Women's 10 kilometers race, finishing in a time of 46 minutes and 56.2 seconds, which put her in 32nd place, last among classified finishers. The gold medal was won by Toini Gustafsson of Sweden in a time of 36 minutes and 46.5 seconds, silver by Galina Kulakova of the Soviet Union and bronze by fellow Soviet Alevtina Kolchina. Four days later on 13 February, Kirsten Carlsen was part of the Women's 5 kilometers race. She finished 34th and last in a time of 19 minutes and 56.6 seconds; Gustafsson won another gold medal, this time in 16 minutes and 45.2 seconds; Berit Mørdre of Norway took silver, and fellow Norwegian Inger Aufles won the bronze.

Event	Athlete	Race	
Event	Athlete	Time	Rank
Men's 15 km	Apollo Lynge	1:00:34.8	67
Men's 15 km	Svend Carlsen	56:09.5	57
Men's 30 km	Apollo Lynge	1:55:40.0	62
Men's 30 km	Svend Carlsen	1:50:51.8	53
Women's 5 km	Kirsten Carlsen	19:56.6	34
Women's 10 km	Kirsten Carlsen	46:56.2	32

== See also ==
- Denmark at the 1968 Summer Olympics
- Denmark at the 1968 Summer Paralympics
