= List of Danish records in speed skating =

The following are the national records in speed skating in Denmark maintained by Dansk Skøjte Union.

== Men ==
Event	Record	Athlete	Date	Meet	Place	Ref
500 meters	37.19	Niclas Mastrup	12 November 2025	Time Trials	Salt Lake City, United States	
500 meters × 2						
1000 meters	1:12.21	Stefan Due Schmidt	31 August 2019	Desert Classic	Salt Lake City, United States	
1500 meters	1:45.44	Viktor Hald Thorup	22 November 2025	World Cup	Calgary, Canada	
3000 meters	3:40.12	Viktor Hald Thorup	6 November 2025	Beehive Burn	Salt Lake City, United States	
5000 meters	6:13.40	Viktor Hald Thorup	1 November 2026	Nagano Oktoberfest Classic	Calgary, Canada	
10000 meters	12:51.88	Viktor Hald Thorup	6 December 2025	World Cup	Heerenveen, Netherlands	
Team pursuit (8 laps)	3:40.88	Philip Due Schmidt; Stefan Due Schmidt; Viktor Hald Thorup	12 December 2021	World Cup	Calgary, Canada	
Sprint combination	150.035 pts	Oliver Sundberg	16–17 March 2007	Olympic Oval Final	Calgary, Canada	
Small combination	156.135 pts	Oliver Sundberg	13–15 March 2007	Olympic Oval Final	Calgary, Canada	
Big combination	172.044 pts	Oliver Sundberg	27–28 January 2007	Norwegian Cup	Arendal, Norway	

== Women ==
Event	Record	Athlete	Date	Meet	Place	Ref
500 meters	37.85	Sofia Thorup	22 November 2025	World Cup	Calgary, Canada	
500 meters × 2						
1000 meters	1:13.76	Sofia Thorup	9 October 2026	Time Trials	Calgary, Canada	
1500 meters	1:54.53	Sofia Thorup	15 November 2025	World Cup	Salt Lake City, United States	
3000 meters	4:07.73	Cathrine Grage	11 December 2009	World Cup	Salt Lake City, United States	
5000 meters	7:10.24	Cathrine Grage	21 November 2009	World Cup	Hamar, Norway	
10000 meters	15:11.84	Cathrine Grage	20 March 2009	Olympic Oval Final	Calgary, Canada	
Team pursuit (6 laps)						
Sprint combination	153.935 pts	Sofia Thorup	5–6 March 2026	World Sprint Championships	Heerenveen, Netherlands	
Mini combination	166.852 pts	Cathrine Grage	18–19 March 2009	Olympic Oval Final	Calgary, Canada	
Small combination	173.171 pts	Cathrine Grage	13–14 March 2007	Olympic Oval Final	Calgary, Canada	
