= Henk Angenent =

Dutch speed skater (born 1967)

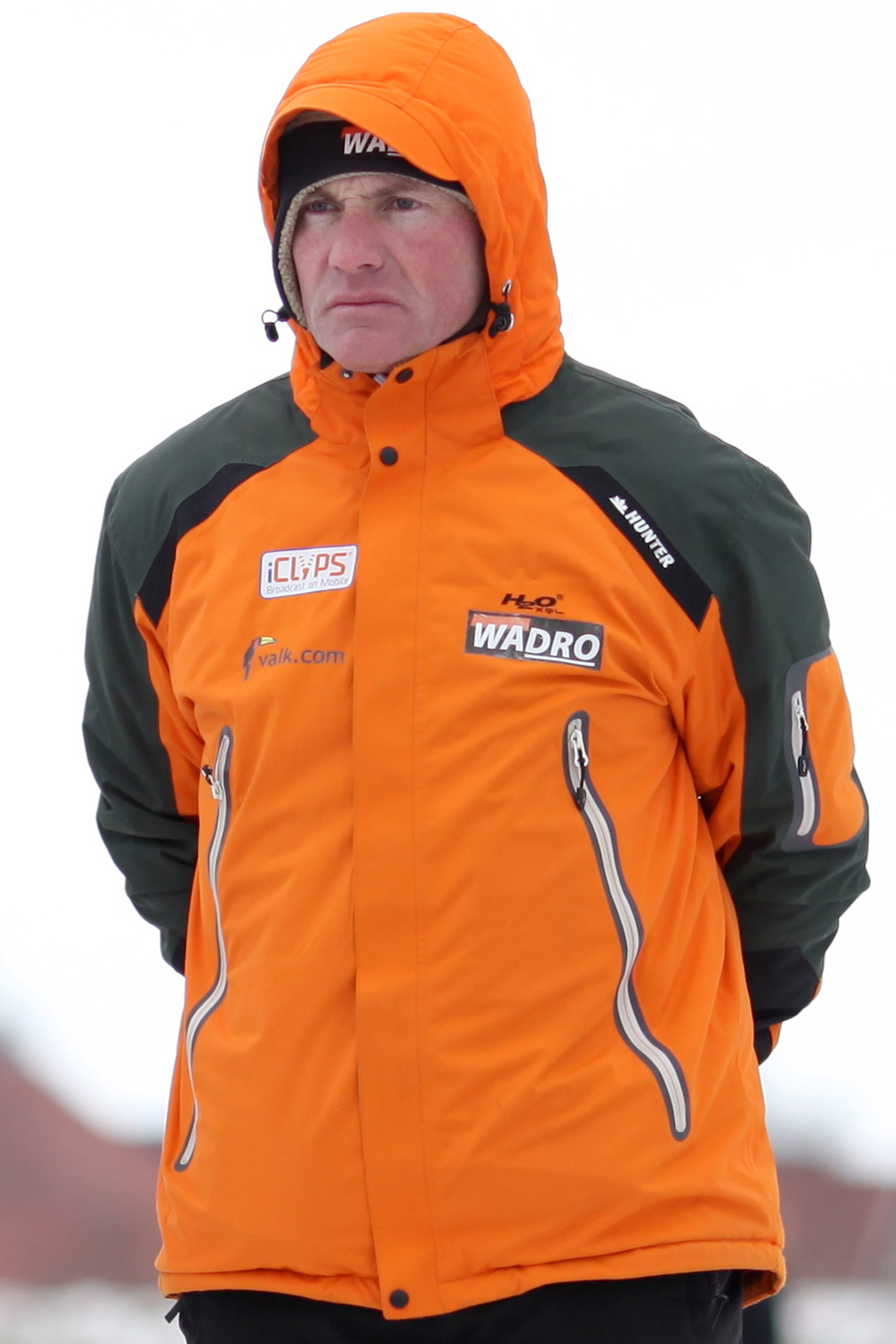

Personal information
- Born: 1 November 1967 (age 58) Woubrugge, Netherlands
- Website: www.henkangenent.nl

Sport
- Country: Netherlands
- Sport: Speed skating
- Turned pro: 1995
- Retired: 2009

Achievements and titles
- Personal best: 1997 Elfstedentocht

Henk Angenent (born 1 November 1967) is a retired Dutch speed skater, specialising in marathon skating and the longer distances. Angenent won the Elfstedentocht on 4 January 1997, outsprinting favourite Erik Hulzebosch at the finish.

On 12 March 2004 in Calgary, Angenent skated 41.669 km in one hour, which was the world record in this event until 15 March 2007, when Casper Helling skated 300 metres more. The previous world record was Roberto Sighel's 41.041 km from 24 March 1999. He won a 4th place at the 10,000 metres of the 2003 World Single Distance Championships, after Bob de Jong, Carl Verheijen and Lasse Sætre. Earlier that year he became Dutch champion on the same distance at the KNSB Dutch Single Distance Championships.

Angenent is a farmer, he grows mainly Brussels sprouts. After winning the Elfstedentocht many interviews were done with Angenent and this subject came up on many occasions. When marathon speedskating became more popular in the Netherlands and the Six Days of the Greenery were introduced, the overall leader of the race wears a Brussels sprout suit. So far he wore the suit himself once in the 2000–01 season. He wore the orange suit for the leader of the Essent Cup a total of 13 days. With his 21 career wins of speed skating marathons on artificial tracks he is ranked 11th together with Henk Portengen and K. C. Boutiette. He is however 3rd in the ranking of still active skaters, behind Jan Maarten Heideman and Cédric Michaud.

== Results ==
Year	Dutch Distance	World Distance
2003	7th 5000 m (gold) 10000 m	4th 10000 m
2004	20th 5000 m 10th 10000 m	-
2005	14th 5000 m 4th 10000 m	-
2006	13th 5000 m 6th 10000 m	

=== Personal bests ===
Personal records
Men's speed skating
Event	Result	Date	Location	Notes
500 m	41.59	8 February 2005	Thialf, Heerenveen	
1,000 m	1:19.54	18 November 2005	Thialf, Heerenveen	
1,500 m	1:56.89	17 November 2005	Thialf, Heerenveen	
3,000 m	3:56.94	18 November 2005	Thialf, Heerenveen	
5,000 m	6:35.73	11 January 2005	Thialf, Heerenveen	
10,000 m	13:21.03	19 February 2005	Thialf, Heerenveen	
41,669 m	60:00.00	12 March 2004	Olympic Oval, Calgary	World record (until 15 March 2007)

Angenent has an Adelskalender score of 160.177 points.

Year	Date	Temperature	Winner (*)		Time	Distance	Average speed
1909	2 January	n/a	Minne Hoekstra		13:50	189 km	13.7 km/h
1912	7 February	3.8°C	Coen de Koning		11:40	189 km	16.2 km/h
1917	27 January	-1.8°C	Coen de Koning		9:53	189 km	19.1 km/h
1929	12 February	-10.1°C	Karst Leemburg		11:09	191 km	17.1 km/h
1933	16 December	-2.0°C	Abe de Vries; Sipke Castelein		9:53	195 km	19.7 km/h
1940	30 January	-6.1°C	Piet Keijzer; Auke Adema; Cor Jongert; Durk van der Duim; Sjouke Westra		11:34	198.5 km	17.3 km/h
1941	7 February	0.0°C	Auke Adema		9:19	198.5 km	21.3 km/h
1942	22 January	-11.7°C	Sietze de Groot		8:44	198 km	22.7 km/h
1947	8 February	-8.5°C	Jan W. van der Hoorn		10:51	191 km	17.6 km/h
1954	3 February	-5.4°C	Jeen van den Berg		7:35	198.5 km	26.2 km/h
1956	14 February	-4.9°C	no winner declared (**)		—	190.5 km	—
1963	18 January	-7.7°C	Reinier Paping		10:59	196.5 km	17.9 km/h
			Winner men	Winner women (*)			
1985	21 February	0.3°C	Evert van Benthem	Lenie van der Hoorn	6:47	196.8 km	29.0 km/h
1986	26 February	-6.9°C	Evert van Benthem	Tineke Dijkshoorn	6:55	199.3 km	28.8 km/h
1997	4 January	-3.6°C	Henk Angenent	Klasina Seinstra	6:49	199.6 km	29.3 km/h
"History" (in Dutch). Vereniging De Friesche Elf Steden [Association of the Eleven Fries Cities].; * Women were first allowed to take part in the tour proper in 1985; before then they had to skate with the amateurs and no award was given. ** After shared wins in 1933 and 1940, when the front-runners decided not to compete but join hands to cross the line together, this practice was forbidden by the organisation. Jan van der Hoorn, Aad de Koning, Jeen Nauta, Maus Wijnhout and Anton Verhoeven however ignored this rule when they crossed the finish line in unison. They were not disqualified, but no winner was declared.: "3,000 Skaters in 124-mile race". The Times. No. 48527. London. 31 January 1940. col. B, p. 7.
