= Maria Sterk =

Dutch marathon speed skater (born 1979)

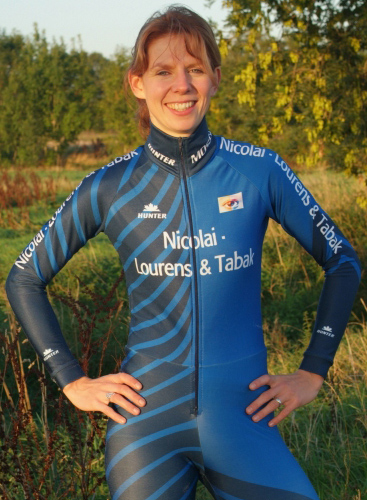
- Maria Sterk

Personal information
- Born: 5 June 1979 (age 47) Hallum, Netherlands

Sport
- Country: Netherlands
- Sport: Speed skating
Medal record
Women's speed skating
Representing the Netherlands
Dutch Marathon Championships
Gold medal – first place	2010 Zuidlaardermeer	Natural ice

Maria Sterk (born 5 June 1979, in Hallum) is a Dutch marathon speed skater.

In 2005, she finished in third position of the Essent Cup and on 11 February of that year she announced to attack the women's world hour speed skating record, which was held by Lilian van Tol at that time. On 30 March 2005, she broke the world record in the Thialf stadium of Heerenveen and set the distance at 36.441,26 metres. Starting with laps of 37 seconds she took an advantage of a minute over the former record before skating laps of 40 seconds. In the end her average laptime was 39.5 seconds, which was enough to break the record. The record set by van Tol was 34.507,30 metres.

Sterk finished second in the 2006 Five Days of the Greenery. She was unable to win any of the races, but finished in second position in two races and gained enough points to claim the second place in the final rankings behind Daniëlle Bekkering, but in front of Elma de Vries. She also managed to claim one second and two third positions at the Essent Cup 2006–07, which is still running. She is currently found at the third spot behind Bekkering and de Vries.

== Records ==
=== Personal records ===
Personal records
Women's speed skating
Event	Result	Date	Location	Notes
500 m	44:02	20 September 2010	Thialf, Heerenveen	
1000 m	1:26.01	19 March 2007	Thialf, Heerenveen	
1500 m	2:07.00	9 December 2011	Thialf, Heerenveen	
3000 m	4:19.10	10 October 2011	Thialf, Heerenveen	
5000 m	7:22.37	30 December 2009	Thialf, Heerenveen	
1 hour	36,441.26 m	29 March 2005	Thialf, Heerenveen	World record (unofficial) until beaten by Carien Kleibeuker on 9 December 2015.

=== World records ===
World records
Women's speed skating
Event	Result	Date	Location	Notes
1 hour	36,441.26 m	29 March 2005	Thialf, Heerenveen	World record (unofficial) until beaten by Carien Kleibeuker on 9 December 2015.

Records
Preceded by (Netherlands) Lilian van Tol	Women's 1 hour speed skating world record (unofficial); 29 March 2005 – 9 December 2015	Succeeded by (Netherlands) Carien Kleibeuker
