= Kurt Stille =

Danish speed skater

Kurt Robert Stille (born 19 November 1934) is a Danish former speed skater, who competed at top international levels from 1957 to 1964.

He was born in Copenhagen, but lives in Norway.

He participated in both the 1960 Winter Olympics and 1964 Winter Olympics. Stille was the only Danish participant in the 1960 Olympics. His 9th place in the 1964 10,000-m was his best result; this was also the best result by any Dane in an individual event in the Winter Olympics history until 2018, when Viktor Hald Thorup placed fifth in the men's mass start speed skating.

At the end of his career, Stille held the Danish speedskating records at all distances. These were 43.3 for 500 m (Karuizawa, 1963), 2:13.9 for 1,500 m (Bislett, 1964), 4:39.0 for 3,000 m (Bislett, 1964), 7:56.1 for 5,000 m (Innsbruck, 1964), and 16:28.5 for 10,000 m (Bislett, 1964). These records lasted a record 41 years, until Oliver Sundberg skated 42.65 (500 m) and 2:06.51 (1500 m) in Groningen on 19 March 2005. Sundberg also broke Stille's other records. Also Danish lady speedskater Cathrine Grage has over the time period 2005–2007 beaten all of Stille's national records.

Although he is still alive, the choir "Sangkoret Lærken" at the Norwegian University of Life Sciences host "Kurt Stilles Mindeløp", a memorial race in his name, every year. Kurt Stille attends each year as a judge.
