= Ingmar Berga =

Dutch speed skater

Personal information
- Born: 17 July 1984 (age 41) Hoogeveen, Netherlands

Sport
- Country: Netherlands
- Sport: Speed skating
Medal record
Men's speed skating
Representing the Netherlands
Dutch Marathon Championships
Gold medal – first place	2007 Amsterdam	Artificial Ice

Ingmar Berga (born 17 July 1984) is a Dutch male marathon speed skater and inline speed skater.

== Honours ==
=== Speed skating ===
- 2006-07 – 1st at one stage in the Essent Cup 2006-07
- 2006-07 – 3rd at one stage in the Essent Cup 2006-07
- 2006-07 – 1st at the Dutch artificial track national marathon championships
- 2006-07 – 1st in first Dutch natural track race in Haaksbergen

=== Inline speed skating ===
- ???? - 2nd in team pursuit at the European Championships
