= Grage =

Grage is a surname. Notable people with the surname include:

- Cathrine Grage (born 1976), Danish speed skater
- Mai Grage (born 1992), Danish tennis player
