= Gelselaar =

- Village
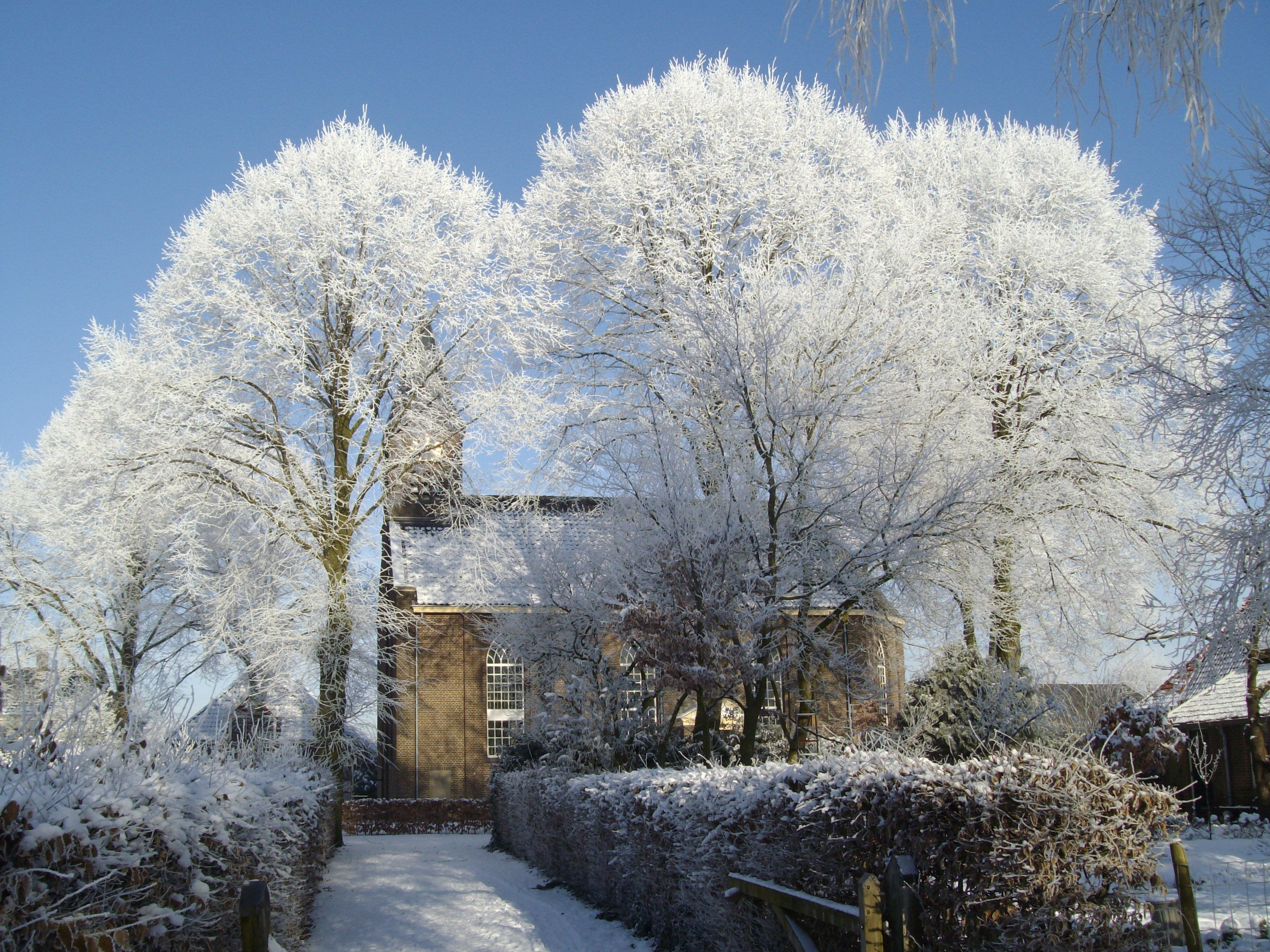
- Gelselaar in winter

- Location in the province of Gelderland Gelselaar (Netherlands)
- Coordinates: 52.16870°N 6.52629°E
- Country: Netherlands
- Province: Gelderland
- Municipality: Berkelland

Area
  - Total: 9.77 km^{2} (3.77 sq mi)
- Elevation: 14 m (46 ft)

Population (2021)
  - Total: 650
  - Density: 67/km^{2} (170/sq mi)
- Time zone: UTC+1 (CET)
  - Summer (DST): UTC+2 (CEST)
- Postal code: 7275
- Dialing code: 0545
- Website: www.gelselaar.nl

Gelselaar is a village in the municipality of Berkelland in the Dutch province of Gelderland. The village is known for its geese. In 2013, it became a protected village site.

== History ==
It was first mentioned in 1326 as Geldersler, and either means forest of Gelle (person) or forest of Gelre (Gelderland), because it is located near the border with Overijssel. Gelselaar developed into an esdorp with a communal pasture in the 19th century.

The village is known for its geese, and was mockingly called "Ganzendorp" (geese village) which is nowadays used as an honorary name. Around 1440, a chapel was built in the village. In 1517, the chapel was replaced by a church. The current church dates from 1841. In 1840, it was home to 625 people.

Between 1910 and 1925, there was a train stop in Geldersler on the Neede–Hellendoorn railway line. In 2013, Gelselaar became a protected village site, because it is in near original condition.

== Events and sights ==
The farm Erve Brooks Niehof was built in 1538. It has been turned into a museum and pancake house, and provides an overview of the whaling and texitle industry of the region as well as archaeological finds.

There is an annual geese market during which there is a competition for best goose herder. During the geese market, the geese and herders roam the streets of the village.

Once a year the gaanzeloop (goose walk), a running competition, is organised. The short competition is 2 kilometres (1.2 mi) through the village, and the long competition is 16.1 kilometres (10.0 mi) through the countryside.

== Notable people ==
- Jan Maarten Heideman (born 1973), speed skater

== Gallery ==
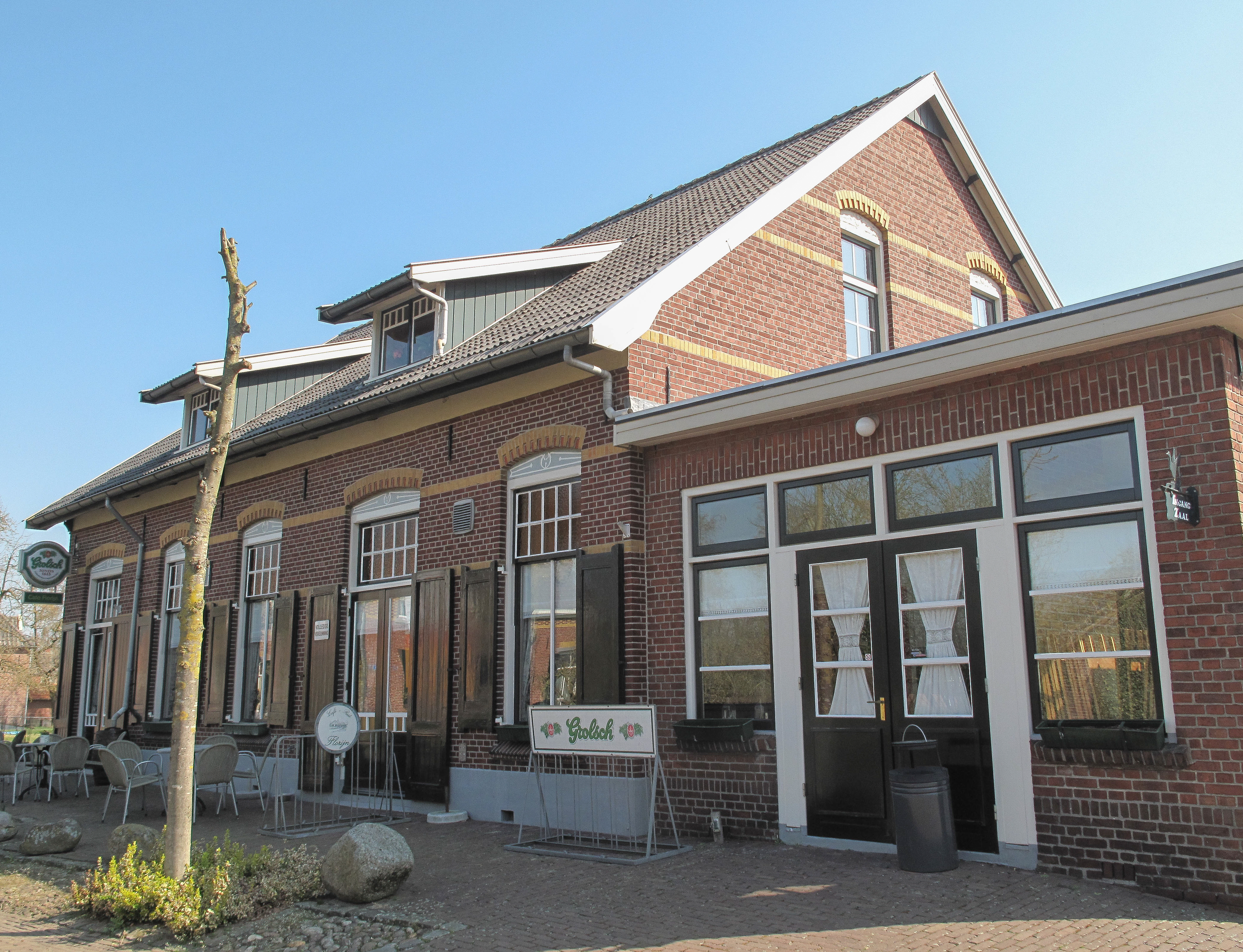
Pub in Gelselaar

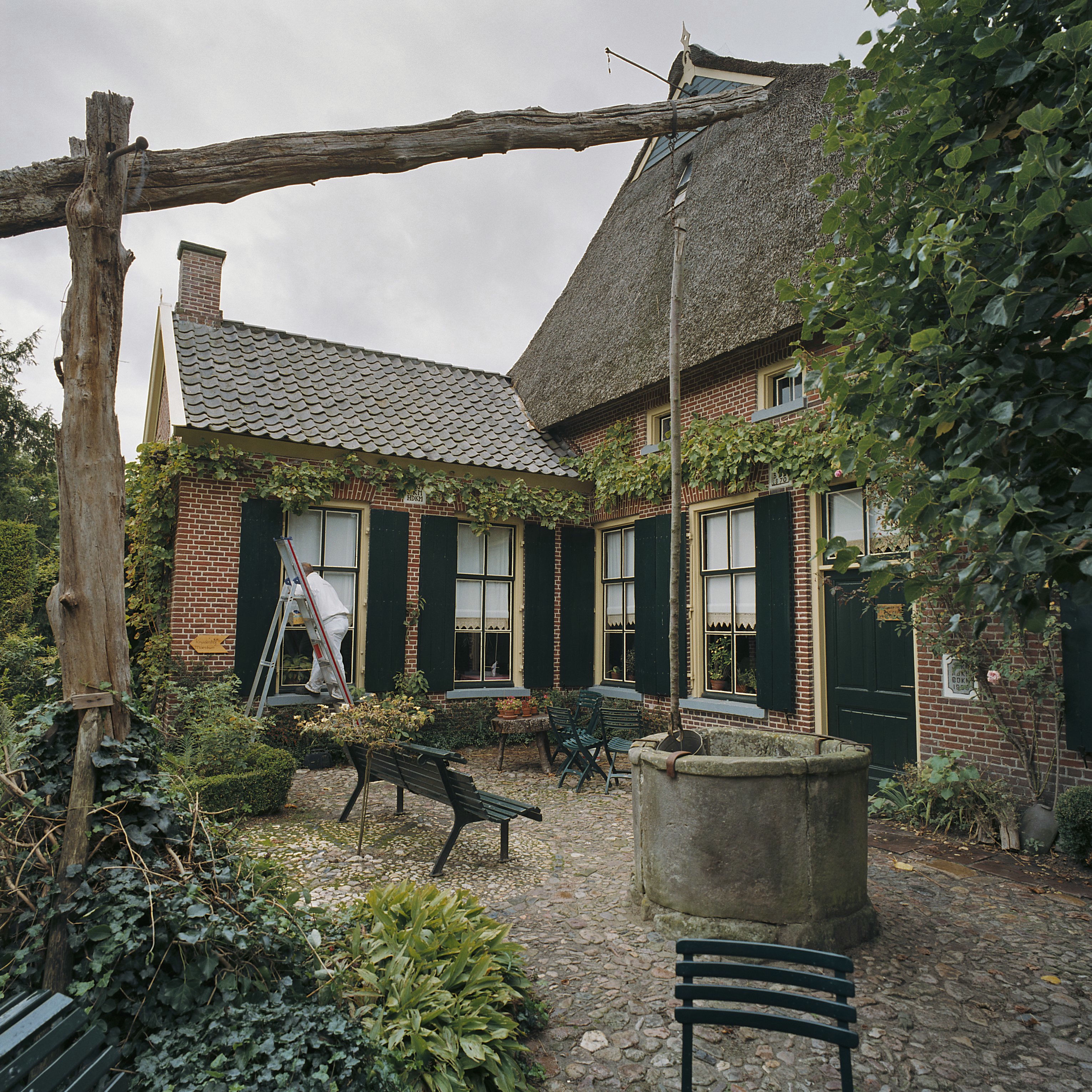
Farm with water well

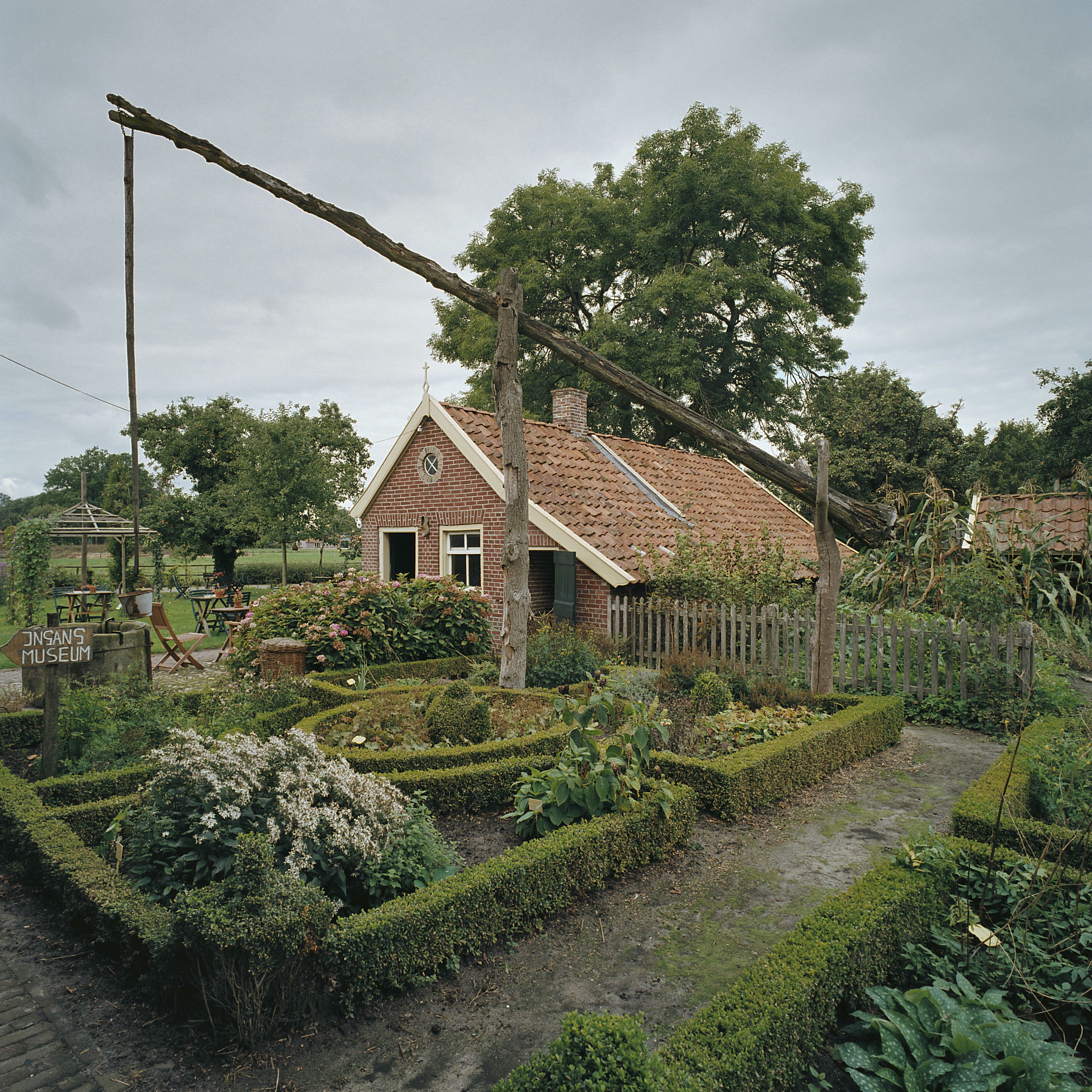
Museum farm Erve Brooks Niehof

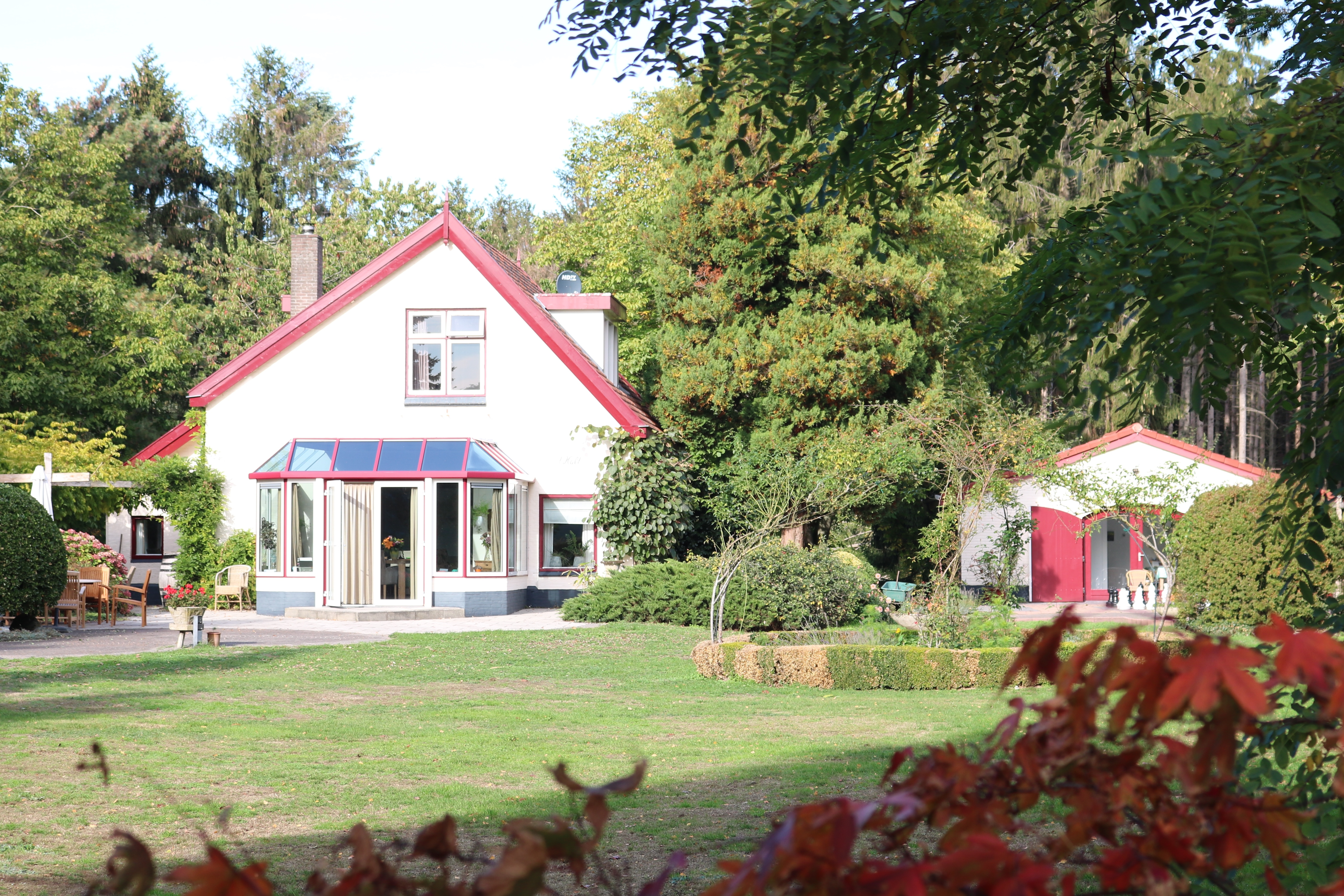
Former train station
