= Elma de Vries =

Dutch speed skater

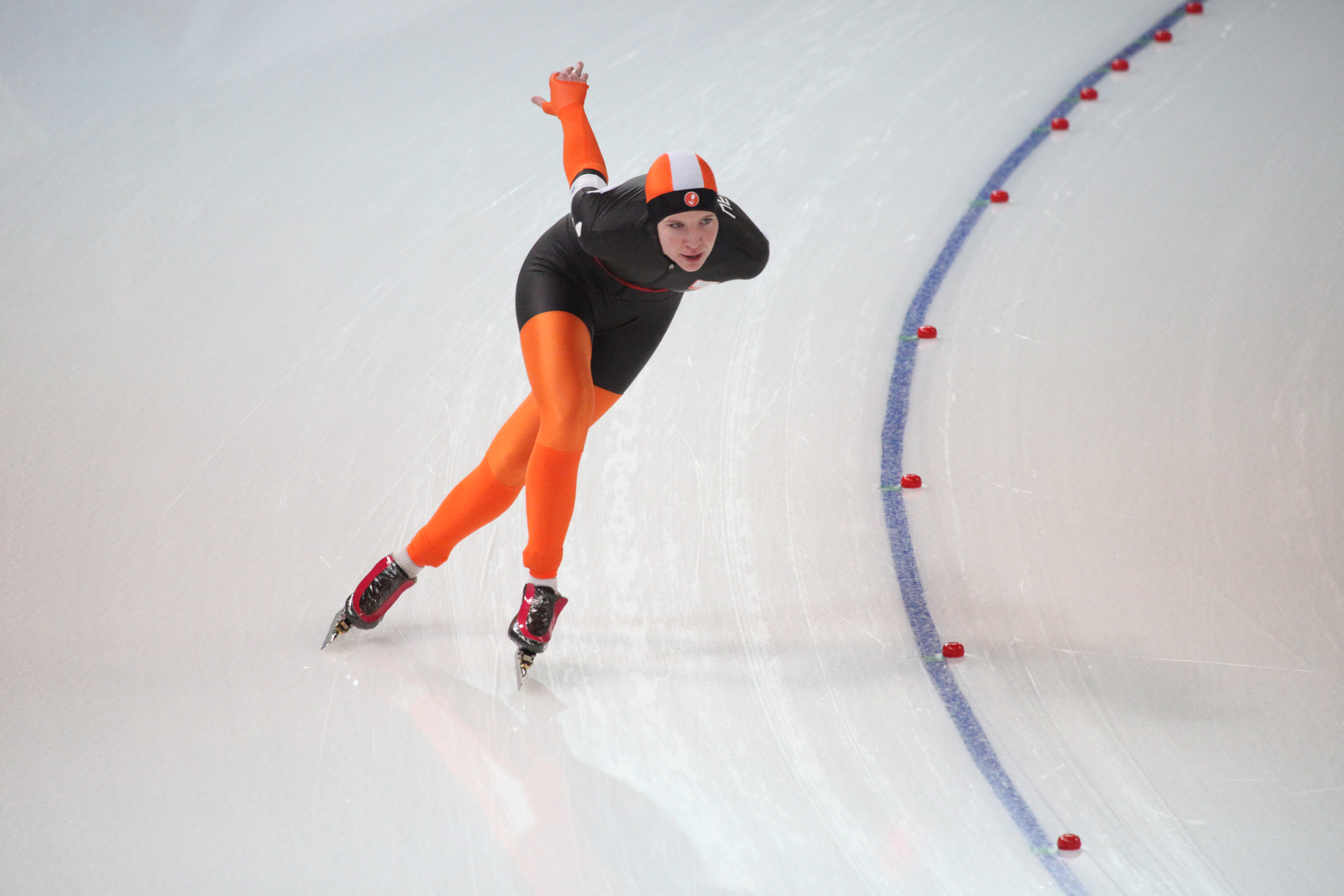
- Elma de Vries, Vancouver 2010

Personal information
- Born: 20 March 1983 (age 43) Haule, Netherlands

Sport
- Country: Netherlands
- Sport: Speed skating
- Turned pro: 2001
Medal record
Women's speed skating
Representing the Netherlands
Dutch Allround championships
Gold medal – first place	2010 Heerenveen	Allround
Silver medal – second place	2009 Heerenveen	Allround
Dutch Marathon Championships
Gold medal – first place	2007 Amsterdam	Artificial Ice

Elma de Vries (born 20 March 1983) is a Dutch marathon speed skater and inline speed skater. She is the older sister of marathon speed skater Bob de Vries.

== Biography ==
De Vries was three years old when she started riding on skates on a small creek near her home, but first became part of a club in artistic gymnastics and athletics before becoming a member at a speed skating club in Noordenveld in 1991. In the Summer of 1992 she started inline speed skating in Leek. In 1996 she was asked to represent the national youth squad of her regional team and eventually represented the Netherlands at five Junior European Championships. In the 2000–01 season she was asked to join Jong Oranje which is the Dutch national youth squad, covered by the national speed skating association KNSB. In two years time as a member of Jong Oranje she appeared on two Junior World Championships. The next two years in the KNSB team she was part of the talent raising squad for starting seniors, while in inline skating she represented the Netherlands in the 2002, 2004 and 2005 European Championships, as well as the 2004 and 2005 World Championships, riding for the Maple Team. In 2004, she trained with the Austrian national speed skating team for a while and in December 2004 she appeared in her first speed skating marathon. Currently she is part of the professional marathon speed skating team DSB and still participates in long track speed skating every now and then.

== Honours ==
=== Speed skating ===
- 2000-01 - 3rd at World Junior Championships
- 2001-02 - 1st at World Junior Championships
- 2002-03 - 4th at Dutch Sprint Championships
- 2002-03 - 2nd at 500 metres - Dutch Allround Championships (8th overall)
- 2002-03 - 1st at Dutch Allround Championships (neo-seniors)
- 2003-04 - 2nd at Dutch Allround Championships (neo-seniors)
- 2004-05 - 1st in Weissensee criterium I
- 2004-05 - 2nd in Weissensee criterium II
- 2005-06 - 1st in first speed skating marathon of the season
- 2005-06 - 1st in three stages at the Four Days of the Greenery (1st overall)
- 2005-06 - 1st in four more marathon races
- 2005-06 - 3rd at Dutch natural track marathon championships
- 2005-06 - 1st in Alternative Elfstedentocht
- 2005-06 - 1st in Weissensee criterium I
- 2005-06 - 1st in Borlänge marathon
- 2006-07 - 1st in five stages of the Essent Cup 2006-07
- 2006-07 - 2nd in three stages of the Essent Cup 2006-07
- 2006-07 - 1st in one stage of the 2006 Six Days of the Greenery (3rd overall)
- 2006-07 - 1st in Dutch artificial track marathon championships
- 2009-10 - 1st 2010 KNSB Dutch Allround Championships

=== Inline speed skating ===
- 1995 - 1st in Dutch track championships - category 5
- 1996 - 1st in Dutch track championships - 3000 metres cadets
- 1996 - 2nd in Dutch track championships - 300 metres cadets
- 1996 - 2nd in Dutch track championships - 1500 metres cadets
- 1997 - 1st in Dutch track championships - 1500 metres cadets
- 1997 - 3rd in Dutch track championships - 300 metres cadets
- 1997 - 1st in Dutch track championships - 3000 metres cadets
- 1997 - 3rd at team relay - European Cadets Championships
- 1998 - 2nd in Dutch track championships - 1500 metres cadets
- 1998 - 3rd in Dutch track championships - 3000 metres cadets
- 1999 - 1st in Dutch track championships - 300 metres juniors
- 1999 - 1st in Dutch track championships - 1500 metres juniors
- 1999 - 1st in Dutch track championships - 3000 metres juniors
- 1999 - 2nd at team relay - European Junior Championships
- 2000 - 1st in Dutch track championships - 300 metres juniors
- 2000 - 1st in Dutch track championships - 1500 metres juniors
- 2000 - 1st in Dutch track championships - 3000 metres juniors
- 2000 - 3rd overall at European Junior Championships
- 2000 - 2nd at 5000 metres points race - European Junior Championships
- 2000 - 1st at team relay - European Junior Championships
- 2000 - 2nd at team pursuit - European Junior Championships
- 2002 - 1st in Dutch track championships - 5000 metres
- 2002 - 2nd in Dutch track championships - 500 metres
- 2002 - 3rd in Dutch track championships - 1500 metres
- 2002 - 3rd at team relay - European Championships
- 2004 - 1st in Dutch track championships - 1000 metres
- 2004 - 1st in Dutch track championships - 5000 metres points race
- 2004 - 1st in Dutch track championships - 15 km elimination
- 2004 - 1st in Dutch track championships - team relay (with Tijn Ponjee and Janneke Hut)
- 2004 - 2nd in Dutch track championships - 300 metres
- 2004 - 2nd in Dutch track championships - 500 metres
- 2004 - 2nd at 1000 metres - European Track Championships
- 2004 - 2nd at team relay - European Track Championships (with Mariska Huisman and Foske Tamar van der Wal)
- 2004 - 3rd at team relay - European Championships (with Tijn Ponjee and Foske Tamar van der Wal)
- 2005 - 1st in Dutch track championships - 300 metres
- 2005 - 1st in Dutch track championships - 500 metres
- 2005 - 1st in Dutch track championships - points race
- 2005 - 1st in Dutch track championships - elimination
- 2005 - 1st in Dutch track championships - team relay
- 2005 - 2nd in Dutch track championships - 1000 metres
- 2005 - 2nd at team relay - European Track Championships (with Tijn Ponjee and Foske Tamar van der Wal)
- 2005 - 3rd at 500 metres - European Championships
- 2005 - 3rd at 10 km points race - European Championships
- 2005 - 3rd overall - World Championships in road distances
- 2006 - 3rd at 500 metres - European Track Championships
- 2006 - 2nd at points race - European Championships
- 2006 - 2nd in Einsiedeln - Swiss Inline Cup
- 2006 - 1st overall in team rankings - Swiss Inline Cup
- 2006 - 2nd individual - World Inline Cup Sunzhou
- 2006 - 1st overall in team rankings - World Inline Cup Sunzhou
