= Oliver Sundberg =

Danish speedskater (born 1982)

Oliver Sundberg (born 16 February 1982) is a Danish speedskater. Along with Cathrine Grage, Sundberg is the first Danish speedskater to reach international competition levels since Kurt Stille ended his career in 1964.

His 2006 and 2007 results were good enough to pass the qualification limits of the International Skating Union for participation in the European Championships. He also regularly competes in ISU's World Cup.

Sundberg started breaking Stille's 41-year-old Danish records on 19 March 2005, when he skated 42.65 in the 500-m and 2:06.51 in the 1,500-m at races in Groningen. Sundberg later broke Stille's other national records, and has repeatedly improved his own best results. As of March 2007, Sundberg has set a Danish record of 36 Danish records. Currently, these are 38.35 (500-m), 1:16.62 (1000-m), 1:53.32 (1500-m), 6:48.67 (5,000-m), and 14:25.57 (10,000-m). When establishing his two most recent Danish records on the 500-m and 1500-m at the Calgary races 10–11 March 2007, Sundberg passed the five-time 1980 Olympic gold winner Eric Heiden on the Adelskalenderen.
