= Kirsten Carlsen =

Danish cross-country skier (born 1938)

Personal information
- Nationality: Danish
- Born: 9 January 1938 (age 87); Copenhagen, Denmark

Sport
- Sport: Cross-country skiing

Kirsten Carlsen (born 9 January 1938) is a Danish cross-country skier. She competed in two events at the 1968 Winter Olympics.
