= Daniëlle Bekkering =

Dutch racing cyclist

Personal information
- Born: 25 December 1976 (age 49) Groningen, the Netherlands

Cycling career
- Sport: Cycling
- Disciplines: Track, road
- Role: Rider
- Rider type: Time trialist

Daniëlle Bekkering
Personal information
- Born: 25 December 1976 (age 49) Groningen, Netherlands

Sport
- Sport: Speed skating
Medal record
Women's speed skating
Representing the Netherlands
Dutch Marathon Championships
Gold medal – first place	2008 Assen	Artificial ice
Gold medal – first place	2009	Artificial ice

Daniëlle Bekkering (born 25 December 1976 in Groningen) is a Dutch marathon speed skater, short track speed skater, and cyclist who currently lives in Den Ham (Groningen). Bekkering has several nicknames like Beeks, Daantje and Dikkie Dik. Her sister Eyelien is also a cyclist.

Bekkering started her speed skating career aged 9 in 1986. She became Dutch junior short track champion in 1993 and 1994. In 1995 she became 6th at the Dutch senior shorttrack championships and fourth in 1996, which earned her a place in the Dutch team for the World Championships.

In 1997 still as a short track speed skater she participated in the Noorder Rondritten, a natural ice speed skating race over 160 kilometres. She finished in third position in the ladies race and said to be totally exhausted after the race. She turned out to be a talented marathon speed skater and switched to that sport to leave the short track behind her and won her first race in 2000. In that same year she also finished in first position at the Dutch allround championships for students. 2001 was her definite breakthrough year as she finished second in the Essent Cup rankings, third on both the Dutch championships in artificial and nature tracks and first in the Three Days of the Greenery, the AGM Marathon in Mora, Sweden, and the Alternative Elfstedentocht in Kuopio, Finland. In 2002, she won both the Essent Cup and the sprint championship of the same cup as well as the Dutch championships on nature ice and two criteriums at the Weissensee in Austria. She finished fourth at the artificial track championships and second in the Greenery.

She was second in the 2003 Essent Cup, but won the sprint competition and successfully defended her nature ice national title. She also won her second Three Days of the Greenery title and finished 5th at the Dutch artificial championships. In 2004, she became Dutch nature ice champion again as well as Essent Cup and sprinters competition winner. She finished third at the artificial championships this time, but managed to win 21 matches in total that year, including The Open Canadian Championships and the Alternative Elfstedentocht in Sylvan Lake, Canada.

She retained all three of her titles (Essent Cup, sprint competition and nature ice title) in 2005 and finished in second position at the artificial track championships. In the Four Days of the Greenery she finished in second position. In 2006, she's dominating the Essent Cup 2006–07, winning five out of ten races so far. She also won the 2006 Five Days of the Greenery where she won four out of five races. She has been wearing the brussels sprout suit for a record of 12 days so far.

As a cyclist she specialises in time trials and finished in 10th position at the Dutch time trial championships in 2001. A year later she reached the fourth spot and in 2005 she became fourth at the Dutch road race championships. In between she won an international road race in Pullheim.

In total she did win 5 times the National championships on nature ice (2003, 2004, 2005, 2006, 2007) and also two times the National Championships on artificial ice; 2008 (Assen) and 2009 (Heerenveen, together with her former husband Yoeri Lissenberg). Since her win at the 10 November 2013 she is the all-time record-holder in marathon speedskating with 62 wins on artificial ice. She took this record from another famous skater: Atje Keulen-Deelstra. She finished her career in 2018 with 63 wins, her last one was at the 3 km FlevOnice track.
