= Casper Helling =

Dutch speed skater

Personal information
- Born: 12 April 1972 (age 54) Ede, Netherlands

Sport
- Country: Netherlands
- Sport: Speed skating

Casper Helling (born 14 April 1972) is a Dutch speedskater, specialising in marathon skating and the longer distances. On 15 March 2007 at the Utah Olympic Oval in Salt Lake City, Helling skated 41.969 km in one hour, which was the current world record in this event. Helling's result was 300 m better than the previous world record, set by Henk Angenent in March 2004. It was bested by Douwe de Vries who covered 42.252 km in one hour on March 14, 2015. Among his other achievements is a gold medal on the 10,000-m in the Dutch single distances championship for the 2001–2002 season. In recent years Casper Helling has won 3 races of 200 km distance on natural ice: Kuopio, Finland, in 2004, Kuopio, Finland in 2008 and Weissensee, Austria in 2009.

As of March 2007, Helling's personal records are 40.37 (500 m), 1:58.00 (1500 m), 6:50.10 (5000 m) and 13:56.31 (10000 m).
