= Svend Carlsen =

Danish skier (born 1938)

Personal information
- Nationality: Danish
- Born: 28 April 1938 (age 86); Frederiksberg, Denmark

Sport
- Sport: Cross-country skiing

Svend Carlsen (born 28 April 1938) is a Danish cross-country skier. He competed at the 1964 Winter Olympics and the 1968 Winter Olympics.
