= Pettit National Ice Center =

Building in Milwaukee, Wisconsin, United States

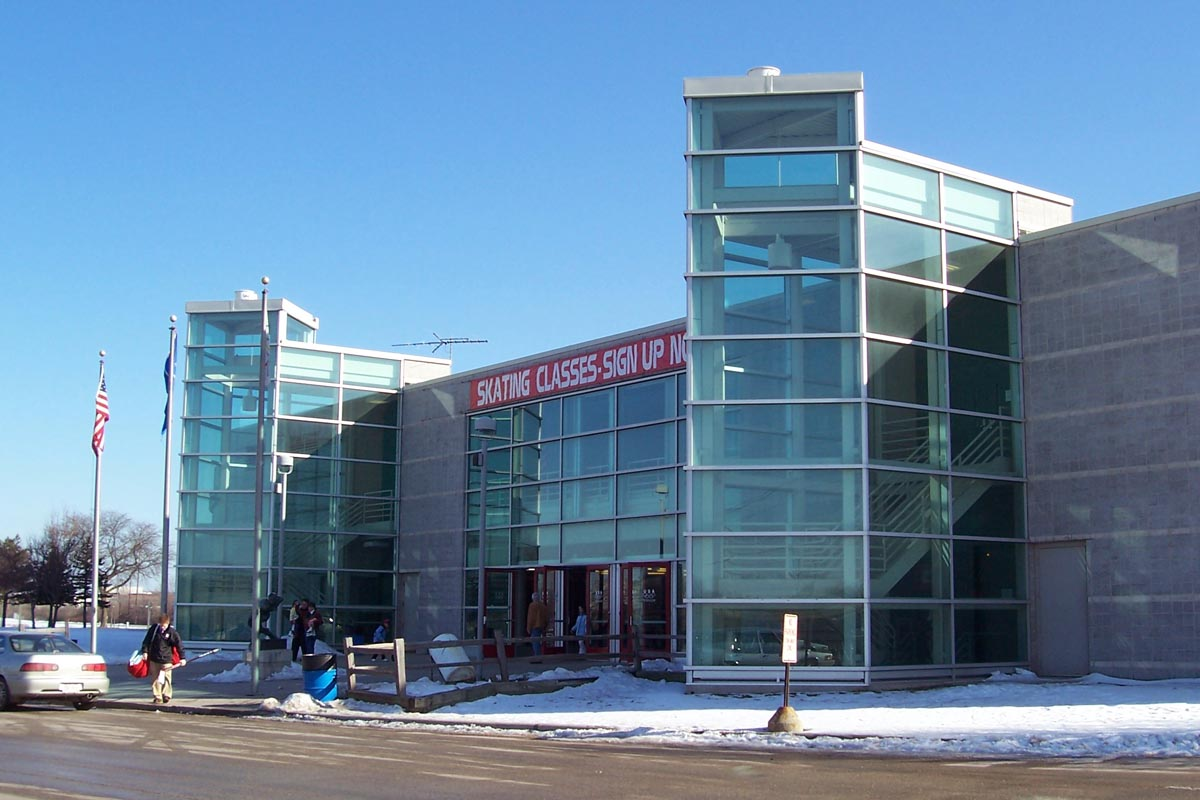
- North entrance in March 2006

- Location in the United States Location in Wisconsin
- Interactive map of Pettit National Ice Center
- Full name: The Pettit National Ice Center
- Former names: Wisconsin Olympic Ice Rink (outdoors, 1967–1991)
- Address: 500 South 84th Street
- Location: Milwaukee, Wisconsin, U.S.
- Coordinates: 43.0256°N 88.016°W
- Capacity: 2,500 – major events on oval
- Surface: Ice – 400 m oval, two hockey rinks
- Acreage: 200,000 sq ft (19,000 m^{2}) – building 155,000 sq ft (14,400 m^{2}) – arena 97,000 sq ft (9,000 m^{2}) – ice
- Public transit: MCTS

Construction
- Opened: January 1, 1993; 33 years ago
- Cost: $13 million ($29.8 million in 2025 dollars)

Website
- thepettit.com

The Pettit National Ice Center is an indoor ice skating facility in Milwaukee, Wisconsin, featuring two international-size ice rinks and a 400-meter speed skating oval. Located adjacent to Wisconsin State Fair Park, the center opened on January 1, 1993, and was named for Milwaukee philanthropists Jane and Lloyd Pettit. Pettit National Ice Center Inc., a non-profit organization, has operated the site since the facility opened.

The Pettit Center replaced, and was constructed on land once occupied by the Wisconsin Olympic Ice Rink, an outdoor facility that was in operation from 1967 to 1991. The indoor climate-controlled Pettit Center was a major improvement and continues to attract many skating athletes from around the world. The Wisconsin Speedskating Club, Pinnacle Speedskating Club and DASH speedskating Club all train at the Pettit Center. The Wisconsin Figure Skating Club and Wisconsin Edge synchronized skating team practices on the figure skating rinks, shared with the Milwaukee Jr. Admirals and many other youth ice hockey organizations who use the facility.

== The rink ==
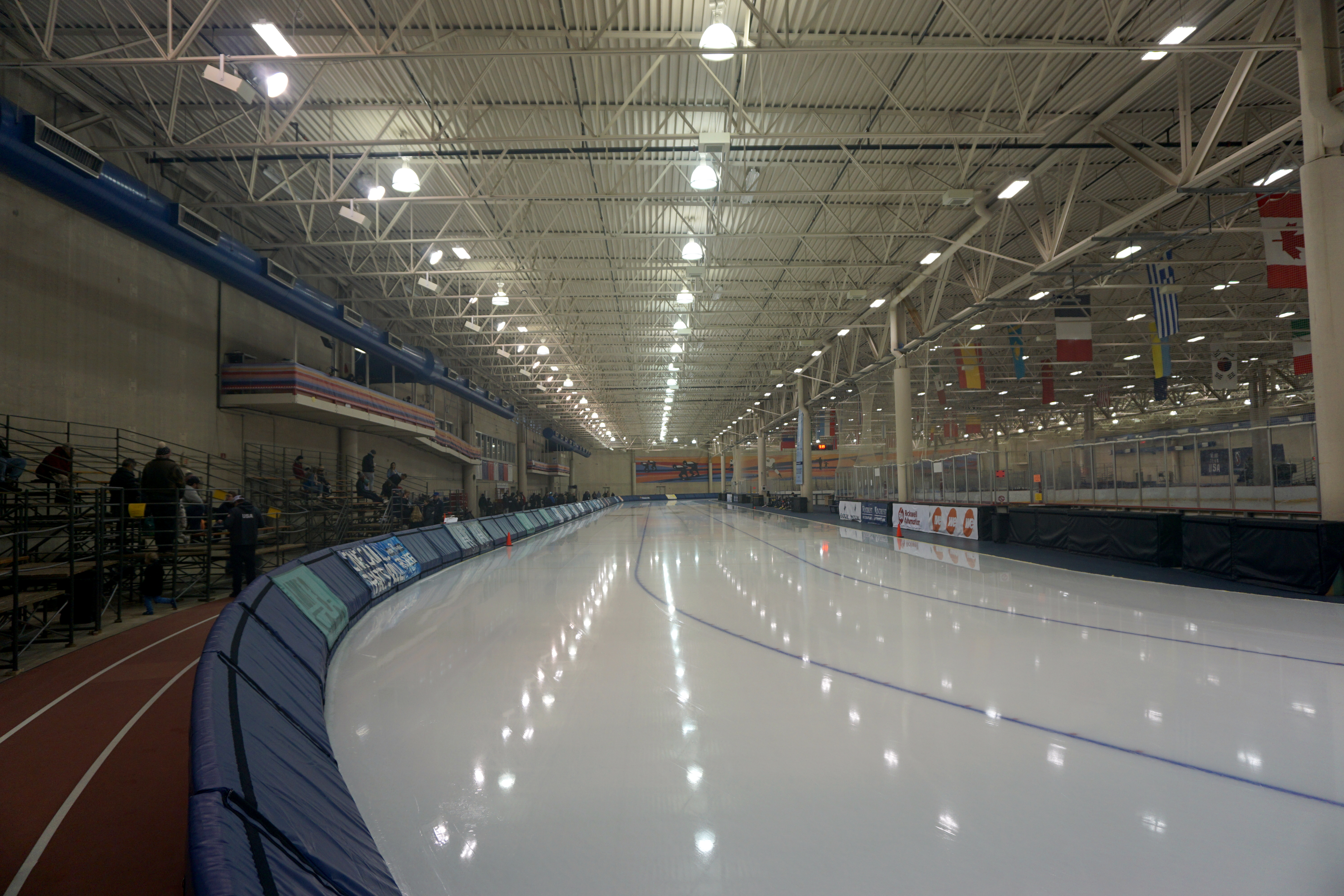
The rink at the Pettit National Ice Center

The Pettit is one of only thirty indoor 400-meter ovals in the world, the sixth oldest, and is an official US Speedskating training facility. The Pettit has hosted numerous skating competitions, including the National Short and Long Track Speed Skating Championships, the 2000 World Allround Championships, the World Sprint Speed Skating Championships, the ISU World Cup in 2025, and the U.S. Olympic Team Trials for Long Track Speed Skating in 2018, 2022, and 2026. The elevation of the facility at street level is approximately 720 feet (220 m) above sea level.

The rink also hosts a skating school that offers classes for children and adults in figure skating, ice hockey, and speed skating.

Olympic speed skating gold medalists Bonnie Blair and Dan Jansen were the rink's first skaters.

=== Facility statistics ===
- $13 million facility
- Area:
  - 200,000 square feet (19,000 m^{2}) — total building
  - 155,000 square feet (14,400 m^{2}) — arena
- 97,000 square feet (9,000 m^{2}) of total ice
- 400-meter oval designed for long track speed skating
- Two Olympic-sized (30 m × 61 m (98 ft × 200 ft)) rinks for ice hockey, figure skating, and short track speed skating
- 443-meter, three-lane run/walk track surrounding the ice oval
- 140-person capacity Hall of Fame lounge overlooking the ice arena
- Skate rental facilities with figure, hockey and speed skates
- Public Skating is available daily October–March

=== Track records ===
==== Men ====
Event	Name	Country	Time	Date
100 m	Tucker Fredricks	United States	9.66	October 21, 2009
500 m	Jordan Stolz	United States	33.91	February 1, 2025
1,000 m	Jordan Stolz	United States	1:06.16	January 31, 2025
1,500 m	Jordan Stolz	United States	1:41.46	February 1, 2025
3,000 m	Ethan Cepuran	United States	3:40.78	October 21, 2023
5,000 m	Sander Eitrem	Norway	6:04.76	January 31, 2025
10,000 m	Ethan Cepuran	United States	13:09.04	January 7, 2023

==== Women ====
Event	Name	Country	Time	Date
100 m	Heather Richardson-Bergsma	United States	10.33	January 9, 2015
500 m	Femke Kok	Netherlands	37.02	February 2, 2025
1,000 m	Miho Takagi	Japan	1:13.56	January 31, 2025
1,500 m	Joy Beune	Netherlands	1:52.11	February 1, 2025
3,000 m	Francesca Lollobrigida	Italy	3:54.73	January 31, 2025
5,000 m	Gunda Niemann-Stirnemann	Germany	7:02.11	February 6, 2000
10,000 m	Melissa Dahlmann	United States	15:49.11	January 26, 2013

== Operational structure ==
Opened on December 31, 1992, the Pettit National Ice Center combined private and public sources for its construction funding. A financial restructuring in conjunction with the State of Wisconsin in January 2007 allowed the Pettit Center to be relieved of burdensome lease payments and past-due rent to the State through a negotiated payment of more than $5 million funded by bank-sponsored financing and a $2 million private contribution. Today, the Pettit National Ice Center, Inc. operates as a private, 501(c)-3 non-profit corporation, that generates 90% of its revenue from operations, including public skating, skating instruction, youth and adult figure skating and hockey programs, running track, and group and corporate meetings, as well as Olympic training. The balance is received through facility and program sponsorships and charitable contributions. The Center has a balanced annual operating budget, while continuing to raise sponsorships and charitable contributions for improvements to the Center.
