= Tristan Loy =

French speedskater (born 1973)

Tristan Loy (born 11 May 1973) is a French long distance and marathon speedskater, long track speedskater, and inline speedskater.

Loy won the 120 kilometres race of the 2006 Finland Ice Marathon in Kuopio. During the 2006 Six Days of the Greenery he did not win a race, nor the final classification, but he was named to be the most exciting skater of the tournament. As a result, he was awarded 18 points for the 2007 Dick van Gangelen Trophy, most of all participating skaters.

Loy also takes part in international long track speed skating races, usually over the long distances 5,000 and 10,000 metres. His performances include a first place (Kolomna, December 2007) and a second place (Erfurt, February 2007) in the B group World Cup race over 10,000 metres. On the first of these occasions, his Group B winning time 13:14.92 was only beaten by one skater in Group A; and on the second occasion, his time was the sixth fastest at the event, faster than Olympic gold medallist Bob de Jong. As of December 2007, Loy is ranked 20th in the 10,000-m distance all-time list. His personal bests are as follows:

Personal records
Men's speed skating
Event	Result	Date	Location	Notes
500 m	44.37	2005-01-02	Davos	
1500 m	2:04.76	2006-01-08	Davos	
3000 m	4:06.78	2006-01-07	Davos	
5000 m	6:35.64	2005-11-19	Salt Lake City	
10000 m	13:14.92	2007-12-03	Kolomna	Group B winner
