= Apollo Lynge =

Danish cross-country skier (1940–2002)

Personal information
- Full name: Apollo Ujunguaq Mortaraq Hans Lynge
- Nationality: Danish
- Born: 11 January 1940; Nuuk, Greenland
- Died: 7 July 2002 (aged 62)

Sport
- Sport: Cross-country skiing

Apollo Lynge (11 January 1940 – 7 July 2002) was a Danish cross-country skier. He competed in the men's 15 kilometre event at the 1968 Winter Olympics.
