= Jan Maarten Heideman =

Dutch speed skater (born 1973)

Personal information
- Born: 16 June 1973 (age 53) Gelselaar, Netherlands

Sport
- Country: Netherlands
- Sport: Speed skating
Medal record
Men's speed skating
Representing the Netherlands
Dutch Marathon Championships
Gold medal – first place	2000	Artificial ice
Gold medal – first place	2002	Artificial ice
Gold medal – first place	2004	Artificial ice

Jan Maarten Heideman (born 16 June 1973) is a Dutch speed skater who specialises in marathon speed skating.

Heideman, currently living in a small town named Gelselaar in the Achterhoek, started as an all-around speed skater, finishing in 8th position three times at the Dutch All-around Speed Skating Championships in 1994, 1995 and 1996. In 1996 he won the bronze medal at the 1500 metres at the KNSB Dutch Single Distance Championships. However, at the age of six he already skated 25 kilometres in one day at the Bolksbeek.

Known as the sprinter among the marathon speed skaters he broke the record of most speed skating marathon wins on artificial tracks after he won his 48th marathon on 21 December 2003. At the end of the 2004–05 season he already expanded his new record to a total of 56 artificial track wins. He became Dutch national marathon speed skating champion three times and won the Alternative Elfstedentocht in Finland twice. In 2006 he won the Open Dutch nature track marathon speed skating Championship at the Weissensee in Austria for the third time. He is also a three-time winner of the Essent Cup and a four-time winner of the Six Days of the Greenery. In Assen on 18 November 2006 in a race for the Essent Cup 2006-07 he won his 67th win.

Jan Maarten Heideman is also known to be the Willie Wortel (Gyro Gearloose) of the speed skating peloton. Together with his sponsor Raps he tested various techniques. In 1997 he was the first and until today the only skater who skated the Elfstedentocht on clap skates. He was also the first skater to show up with the 3D-skate, the carve-skate, the shark suit, the bird suit, the kluun shoe, the heater skate and the change skate.

In 2001 he released a book called "Leren van schaatser Jan Maarten Heideman" (Learning from speed skater Jan Maarten Heideman). He was one of the skaters that organised a mass in an Austrian church with 450 speed skaters showing up in the weekend the Alternative Elfstedentocht was skated in 2004.

== Honours ==
- 69 artificial track speed skating marathon wins, the last one being the final race of the 2006 Six Days of the Greenery in Alkmaar.
- Dutch national marathon speed skating champion: 3 times
- Alternative Elfstedentocht (Finland) winner: 2 times
- Open Dutch marathon speed skating on nature track champion: 3 times
- Six Days of the Greenery winner: 1998, 1999, 2000, 2006
