= K. C. Boutiette =

American speed skater (born 1970)

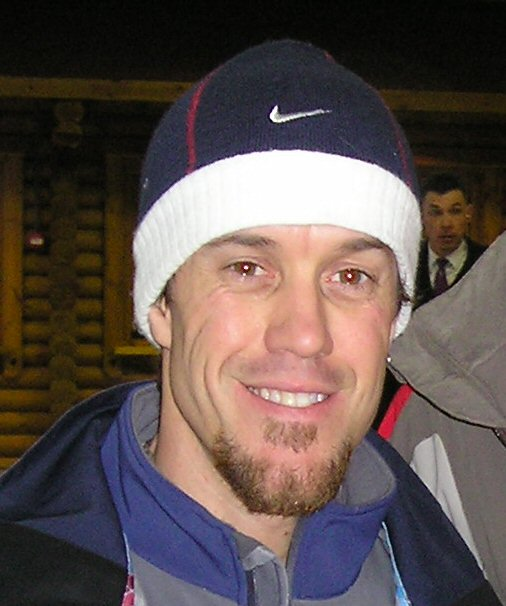
- Boutiette in 2006

Personal information
- Born: April 11, 1970 (age 56) Tacoma, Washington, U.S.
- Spouse: Kristi Kirkeide Boutiette

Sport
- Country: United States
- Sport: Speed skating
Medal record
Men's speed skating
World Allrounds
Silver medal – second place	1997	1500 m
Silver medal – second place	1998	500 m
U.S. Long Track Championships
Gold medal – first place	2003	5000 m
Silver medal – second place	2003	1500 m
Silver medal – second place	2004	5000 m
Bronze medal – third place	2004	1500 m
U.S. Allrounds
Gold medal – first place	1994	Overall
Gold medal – first place	1996	Overall
Gold medal – first place	1997	Overall
Silver medal – second place	1995	Overall
Silver medal – second place	2000	Overall
Silver medal – second place	2002	Overall
Gold medal – first place	2015	Overall
U.S. Sprints
Silver medal – second place	1999	Overall
Olympic Trials
Gold medal – first place	1994	5000 m
Gold medal – first place	1994	10000 m
Silver medal – second place	1998	1000 m
Silver medal – second place	1998	10000 m
Silver medal – second place	2002	10000 m

K. C. Boutiette (born April 11, 1970) is an American speed skater from Tacoma, Washington, and a five-time Olympian. He was first of the wave of inline speed skaters, and made the transition from inline to ice, in order to have a shot at going to the Olympics.

== Biography ==
In 1993, he showed up at the Pettit National Ice Center in Milwaukee, Wisconsin, looking to improve his technique on inline skates. However, he ended up earning a spot on the team that would be sent to the 1994 Winter Olympics in Lillehammer, Norway. Although he had been a champion inline speed skater for years, Boutiette at that time had no ice speed skating experience at all. Nevertheless, within a few months he made the team.

Although Boutiette has never won an Olympic medal, he demonstrated to other American inline speed skaters that the opportunity was there if they would give it a shot. Following in his footsteps were Apolo Ohno, Derek Parra, Jennifer Rodriguez (Boutiette's ex-wife), and Joey Cheek, who won seven medals at the 2002 Winter Olympics in Salt Lake City, Utah. After 2002 he went out and hand-picked another former inline skater, Chad Hedrick, who went on to win three medals at the 2006 Winter Olympics in Turin, Italy, after switching to ice skating in 2003. Now almost half of the Olympic team were inline skaters for whom he paved the way. Boutiette skated in the team pursuit in the 2006 Olympics.

In the Netherlands, Boutiette participated as a marathon speed skater for several years and in this period he won the Six Days of the Greenery twice in 2003 and 2004. He wore the Brussels sprout suit for ten days in between 2003 and 2005, the second in ranking after Cédric Michaud. In total he won 23 speed skating marathons on artificial tracks. He also was the leader in the Essent Cup for two days, wearing the orange suit.

== Family ==
Boutiette has three children, Braam, Brooke, and Boone.

== Records ==
=== World records ===
Event	Time	Date	Venue
1500 m	1:50.09	March 15, 1997	Olympic Oval, Calgary
Small combination	154.103	March 15, 1997	Olympic Oval, Calgary

Source: SpeedSkatingStats.com

=== Personal records ===
Personal records
Men's speed skating
Event	Result	Date	Location	Notes
500 m	36.09	January 10, 2004	Utah Olympic Oval, Salt Lake City	
1000 m	1:09.09	January 3, 2004	Utah Olympic Oval, Salt Lake City	
1500 m	1:46.78	December 28, 2002	Utah Olympic Oval, Salt Lake City	
3000 m	3:47.16	October 1, 2005	Utah Olympic Oval, Salt Lake City	
5000 m	6:22.97	February 9, 2002	Utah Olympic Oval, Salt Lake City	
10000 m	13:21.06	February 28, 2004	Thialf, Heerenveen	

== See also ==
- World Fit
