= Andrès Landman =

Dutch marathon speed skater (born 1976)

Personal information
- Born: November 19, 1976 (age 49) Netherlands

Sport
- Country: Netherlands
- Sport: Speed skating

Andrès Landman (born 19 September 1976) is a Dutch marathon speed skater.

As of today Landman won two marathons on artificial speed skating tracks, including one during the 2006 Six Days of the Greenery. In 2004 and 2005 he rode five races in the orange suit as the leader of the Essent Cup. While in 2006 he was wearing the brussels sprout suit for being the leader in the Six Days of the Greenery one day.
