= Foske Tamar van der Wal =

Dutch speed skater (born 1986)

Personal information
- Born: 13 October 1986 (age 40) Bedum, Groningen, Netherlands
- Years active: 2006–2015

Sport
- Sport: Speed skating
- Event: Marathon speed skating
- Club: Team Okkinga

Foske Tamar van der Wal (born 13 October 1986) is a Dutch former long-track speed skater and marathon speed skater.

== Biography ==
In 2002, Van der Wal became the champion in the Junior C category at the Dutch Short Track Championships. In 2006, at the age of nineteen, she became the youngest ever winner of a marathon speed skating event. From the 2006/2007 season, she was part of the Royal Dutch Skating Federation (Koninklijke Nederlandsche Schaatsenrijders Bond; KNSB) Development Team, and from the 2008/2009 season, she competed for the Hofmeier team. However, after the first day of the national selection trials for the 2008 Dutch Single Distances Championships, she announced her immediate retirement from long-track speed skating, even though she had signed a two-year contract just that August.

In the 2010/2011 season, Van der Wal made her comeback with the marathon speed skating team Van der Wiel. On 30 October 2010, she immediately secured a victory in the second Marathon Cup event. Subsequently, on 29 November 2010, she won the first marathon race on natural ice in Noordlaren. On 23 December 2010, at Belterwiede near Wanneperveen, she became the Dutch national champion in natural-ice marathon speed skating by defeating Reitsma and 't Hart, both of whom skated for the MK team, in a sprint finish. On 1 February 2012, Van der Wal won the Open Dutch Marathon Skating Championships on natural ice on the Weißensee in Austria. On 4 March 2012, she finished third, behind fellow marathon skater Mariska Huisman and veteran Claudia Pechstein, in the mass-start event at the World Cup competition held at Thialf.

On 10 January 2015, Van der Wal announced that she would retire from élite-level sport at the end of the season.

== Personal bests ==
Distance	Time	Date	Track
500 m	41.14	4 March 2006	(Germany) Berlin
1000 m	1:21.22	19 December 2005	(Netherlands) Heerenveen
1500 m	2:00.42	27 December 2005	(Netherlands) Heerenveen
3000 m	4:11.10	28 December 2005	(Netherlands) Heerenveen
5000 m	7:18.41	30 December 2005	(Netherlands) Heerenveen

== Results ==
Year	NK Distance	NK All-round	WK Juniors	NK marathon on artificial ice	KNSB Cup
2006	8th 1500 m 6th 3000 m 10th 5000 m	7th	13th (gold) pursuit	1st place, gold medalist(s)	6th
2007	20th 1000 m 20th 3000 m			7th	17th
2008	16th 1500 m 14th 3000 m 8th 5000 m	12th		-	
2011				2nd place, silver medalist(s)	
2012				3rd place, bronze medalist(s)	
2013				2nd place, silver medalist(s)	
2014				1st place, gold medalist(s)	
2015				3rd place, bronze medalist(s)	

=== Medal table ===
Championship	Gold (gold)	Silver (silver)	Bronze (bronze)
NK Distance	0	0	0
NK All-round	0	0	0
WK Juniors	1	0	0
NK Marathon (artificial ice)	2	2	1

== Marathon top-3 results ==
2006

- 1st Essent Cup 13
- (gold) Essent Dutch Championships The Hague
- (gold) Essent Cup 9 Groningen
- (gold) Essent Cup 3 The Hague
- (gold) Essent Cup 2 Breda

2007

- (gold) Essent Cup 9 Amsterdam
- (gold) Essent Cup 1 Utrecht

2009

- 2nd KNSB Marathon Cup 11 Heerenveen

2011

- 2nd KPN Marathon Cup 1 Amsterdam
- (gold) KPN Marathon Cup 2 Heerenveen
- 2nd KPN Marathon Cup 3 Utrecht
- 2nd KPN Marathon Cup 4 The Hague
- (gold) KPN Marathon Cup 5 Hoorn
- 2nd KPN Marathon Cup 6 Eindhoven
- (gold) Marathon Noordlaren
- 3rd Marathon Veenoord
- 3rd KPN Marathon Cup 7 Enschede
- 2nd KPN Marathon Cup 8 Breda
- (gold) KPN Marathon Cup 10 Amsterdam
- 3rd Marathon Gramsbergen
- (gold) Dutch Championships on Natural Ice Belterweide
- 2nd KPN Nederlands Kampioenschappen Utrecht
- 3rd De 100 van Eernewoude
- 3rd KPN Marathon cup 13 Amsterdam
- (gold) KPN Marathon Cup 14 Biddinghuizen
- 3rd KPN Marathon 15 Alkmaar
- 3rd KPN Marathon 17 Groningen

2012

- 3rd Essent ISU World Cup Heerenveen
- (gold) Skating Marathon Appingedam
- (gold) Veluwemeertocht Elburg
- (gold) De Ronde van Skasterlân
- (gold) Ronde van Duurswold Steendam
- (gold) KPN Open Dutch Championship Weißensee
- 3rd Aart Koopmans Memorial Weißensee
- (gold) KPN Marathon Cup Finale Groningen
- 3rd Flevonice Bokaal Biddinghuizen
- (gold) KPN Marathon Cup 14 Deventer
- (gold) KPN Marathon Cup 13 Hoorn
- (gold) KPN Marathon Cup 12 Alkmaar
- (gold) Finale Superprestige Biddinhuizen
- (gold) KPN Marathon Cup 11 Enschede
- (gold) World Cup Qualifier Mass-start
- 3rd KPN Dutch Championships
- (gold) KPN Marathon Cup 10 Breda
- (gold) 1st etappe Superprestige Biddinghuizen
- (gold) KPN Marathon Cup 9 Amsterdam
- 2nd KPN Marathon Cup 8 Assen
- (gold) KPN Marathon Cup 7 Tilburg
- (gold) Kwintus Nova Trophy Dronten
- (gold) KPN Marathon Cup 6 Hoorn
- 2nd KPN Marathon Cup 5 The Hague
- (gold) KPN Marathon Cup 4 Eindhoven
- (gold) KPN Marathon Cup 2 Heerenveen
- (gold) KPN Marathon Cup 1 Amsterdam

2013

- (gold) Afvalkoers Dronten
- 3rd Puntenkoers Dronten
- (gold) Ronde van Skasterlân
- 2nd Dutch Championships
- 3rd KPN Marathon Cup Finale Amsterdam
- 3rd Marathon Gramsbergen
- 3rd Marathon Haaksbergen
- 3rd Marathon Noordlaren
- 2nd KPN Marathon Cup 11 Hoorn
- 3rd KPN Marathon Cup 9 Groningen
- (gold) KPN Marathon Cup 8 Assen
- 3rd Kwintus Nova Trophy Dronten
- (gold) KPN Marathon Cup 6 Haarlem
- (gold) KPN Marathon Cup 4 The Hague
- 2nd KPN Marathon Cup 3 Deventer
- 3rd KPN Marathon Cup 2 Utrecht
- 3rd KPN Marathon Cup 1 Amsterdam

2014

- 3rd KPN Open Dutch Championship Weißensee
- 3rd KPN Marathon Cup 13 Groningen
- (gold) KPN Dutch Championship Dronten
- 2nd KPN Marathon Cup 9 Assen
- 2nd Openingsmarathon Flevonice Biddinghuizen
- 3rd Kwintus Nova Trophy Dronten
- 3rd KPN Marathon Cup 6 Haarlem
- 3rd KPN Marathon Cup 4 Utrecht
- 3rd KPN Marathon Cup 3 Deventer
- 2nd KPN Marathon Cup 2 Heerenveen
- 2nd KPN Marathon Cup 1 Amsterdam

2015

- 2nd Grand Prix 4 Falun
- 2nd KPN Open Dutch Championship Weißensee
- 2nd KPN Marathon Cup 14 Heerenveen
- 3rd KPN Dutch Championship Marathon Seniors Groningen
- 3rd KPN Marathon Cup 11 Groningen
- 3rd KPN Marathon Cup 9 Breda
- (gold) KPN Marathon Cup 8 Tilburg
- (gold) KPN Marathon Cup 5 Haarlem
