= Cédric Michaud =

French speed skater (born 1976)

- Born: February 26, 1976 (age 49); Machecoul, France
- Occupation: Speed skater

Cédric Michaud (born 26 February 1976, in Machecoul) is a French marathon speed skater.

He was the first non-Dutchman after Oleg Bozhev to win the Essent Cup in 2002–03, while he won the cup another time in 2005–06. In that year he also won the Dick van Gangelen Trophy and the Six Days of the Greenery. He also won the latter in 2001–02 and 2002–03.

As of today Michaud has won 35 marathons on artificial speed skating tracks, including two during the 2006 Six Days of the Greenery. Between 2002 and 2006 he rode 26 races in the orange suit as the leader of the Essent Cup. While between 2000 and 2006 he was wearing the Brussels sprout suit for being the leader in the Six Days of the Greenery 25 days, which is the current record, with K. C. Boutiette following at 10 days.
