= Long-track speed skating =

Competitive skating on a 400-meter oval ice track

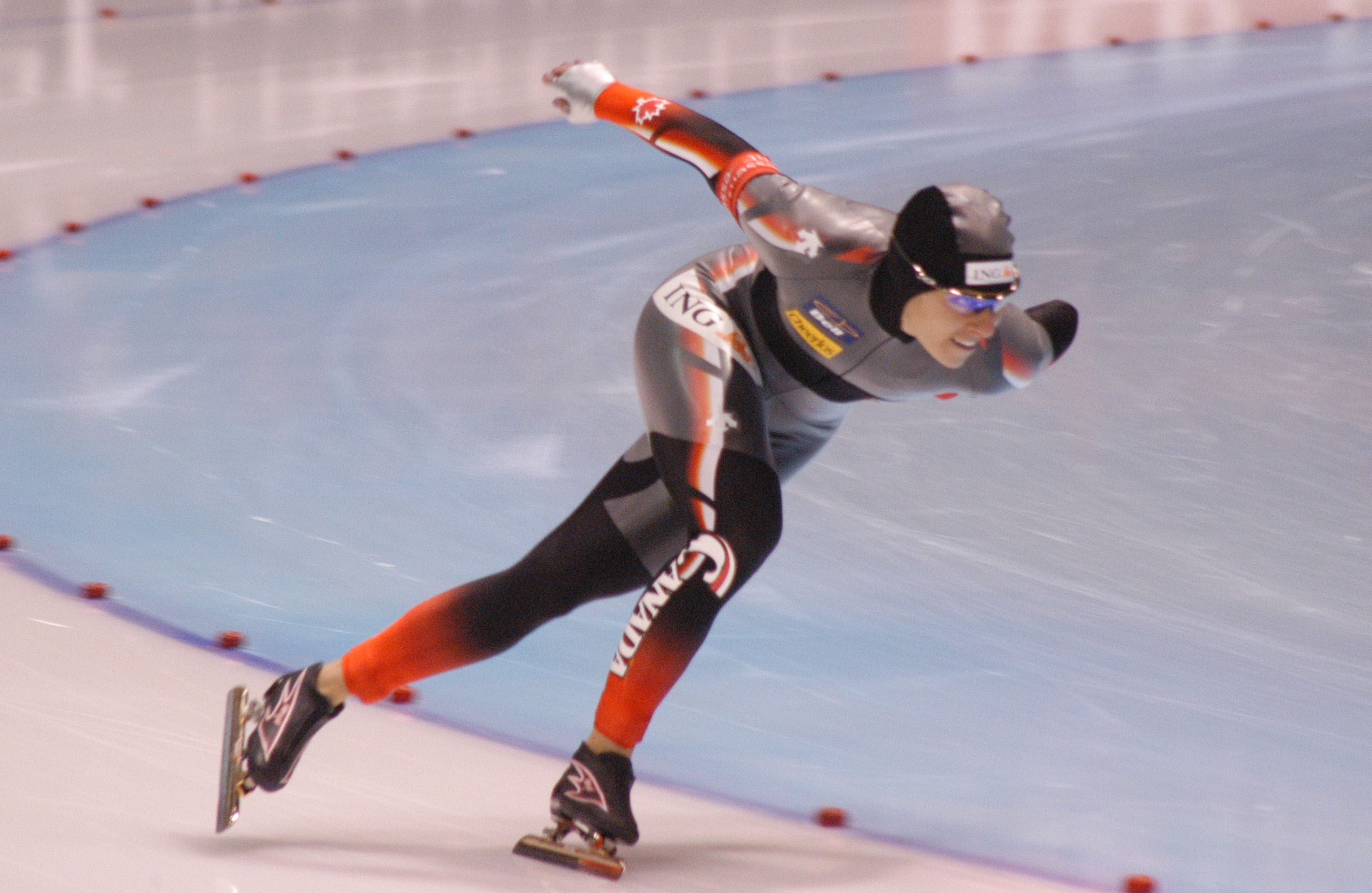
- Competitive speed skater (Shannon Rempel 2007)
- Highest governing body: International Skating Union

Characteristics
- Mixed-sex: Yes

Presence
- Olympic: 1924

Pictogram for Long-track speed skating at the Winter Olympics.

Long-track speed skating, usually simply referred to as speed skating, is the Olympic discipline of speed skating where competitors are timed while crossing a set distance. It is also a sport for leisure. Sports such as ice skating marathon, short-track speedskating, inline speedskating, and quad speed skating are also called speed skating.

Long-track speed skating enjoys large popularity in the Netherlands and has also had champion athletes from Austria, Canada, China, Finland, Germany, Japan, Italy, Norway, Poland, South Korea, Russia, Sweden, the Czech Republic and the United States. Speed skaters attain maximum speeds of 60 km/h (37 mph).

== History ==
=== ISU development ===
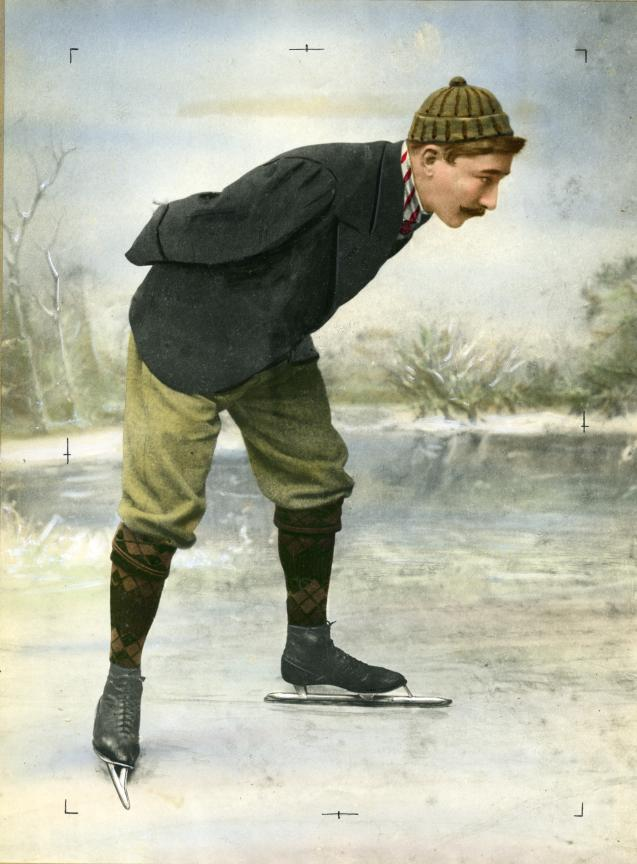
Jaap Eden, the first official world champion

The roots of speed skating date back over a millennium to Scandinavia, Northern Europe and the Netherlands, where the natives added bones to their shoes and used them to travel on frozen rivers, canals and lakes. In contrast to what people think, ice skating has always been an activity of joy and sports and not a matter of transport. For example, winters in the Netherlands have never been stable and cold enough to make ice skating a way of travelling or a mode of transport. This has already been described in 1194 by William Fitzstephen, who described a sport in London.

Later, in Norway, King Eystein Magnusson, later King Eystein I of Norway, boasts of his skills racing on ice legs.

However, skating and speed skating was not limited to the Netherlands and Scandinavia; in 1592, a Scotsman designed a skate with an iron blade. It was iron-bladed skates that led to the spread of skating and, in particular, speed skating. By 1642, the first official skating club, The Skating Club Of Edinburgh, was born, and, in 1763, the world saw its first official speed skating race, at Wisbech on the Fens in England for a prize sum of 70 guineas. While in the Netherlands, people began touring the waterways connecting the 11 cities of Friesland, a challenge which eventually led to the Elfstedentocht.

By 1851, North Americans had discovered a love of the sport, and indeed the all-steel blade was later developed there. The Netherlands came back to the fore in 1889 with the organization of the first world championships. The ISU (International Skating Union) was also born in the Netherlands in 1892. By the start of the 20th century, skating and speed skating had come into its own as a major popular sporting activity.

=== Elfstedentocht and Dutch history ===
The Elfstedentocht (Eleven Cities Tour) was organised as a competition in 1909 and has been held at irregular intervals whenever the ice on the course is deemed good enough. Other outdoor races developed later, with North Holland hosting a race in 1917, but the Dutch natural ice conditions have rarely been conducive to skating. The Elfstedentocht has been held 15 times since 1909, and, before artificial ice was available in 1962, national championships had been held in 25 of the years between 1887, when the first championship was held in Slikkerveer, and 1961. Since artificial ice became common in the Netherlands, Dutch speed skaters have been among the top long-track speed skaters and marathon skaters in the world.

Another solution to still be able to skate marathons on natural ice became the Alternative Elfstedentocht. The Alternative Elfstedentocht races take part in other countries, such as Austria, Finland or Canada, and all top marathon skaters as well as thousands of recreative skaters travel from the Netherlands to the location where the race is held. According to the NRC Handelsblad journalist Jaap Bloembergen, the country "takes a carnival look" during international skating championships, despite the fact that "people outside the country are not particularly interested."

=== Olympic Games ===
At the 1914 Olympic Congress, the delegates agreed to include long-track speed skating in the 1916 Olympics, after figure skating had featured in the 1908 Olympics. However, World War I put an end to the plans of Olympic competition, and it was not until the winter sports week in Chamonix in 1924—retroactively awarded Olympic status—that ice speed skating reached the Olympic programme. Charles Jewtraw from Lake Placid, New York, won the first Olympic gold medal, though several Norwegians in attendance claimed Oskar Olsen had clocked a better time. Timing issues on the 500 m were a problem within the sport until electronic clocks arrived in the 1960s; during the 1936 Olympic 500-metre race, it was suggested that Ivar Ballangrud's 500-metre time was almost a second too good. Finland won the remaining four gold medals at the 1924 Games, with Clas Thunberg winning 1,500 metres, 5,000 metres, and allround. It was the only time an allround Olympic gold medal has been awarded in speed skating.

Norwegian and Finnish skaters won all the gold medals in World Championships between the world wars, with Latvians and Austrians visiting the podium in the European Championships. At the time, North American races were usually conducted pack-style, similar to the marathon races in the Netherlands, but the Olympic races were to be held over the four ISU-approved distances. The ISU approved the suggestion that the 1932 Olympic speed skating competitions should be held as pack-style races, and Americans won all four gold medals. Canada won five medals, all silver and bronze, while defending World Champion Clas Thunberg stayed at home, protesting against this form of racing. At the World Championships held immediately after the Games, without the American champions, Norwegian racers won all four distances and occupied the top three spots in the allround standings.

Norwegian, Swedish, Finnish and Japanese skating leaders protested to the USOC, condemning the manner of competition, and expressing the wish that mass start races were never to be held again at the Olympics. However, ISU adopted the short-track speed skating branch, with mass start races on shorter tracks, in 1967, arranged international competitions from 1976, and brought them back to the Olympics in 1992.

=== Women's competitions ===
In the 1930s, women began to be accepted in ISU speed skating competitions. Although women's races had been held in North America for some time and competed at the 1932 Winter Olympics in a demonstration event, the ISU did not organise official competitions until 1936. However, Zofia Nehringowa set the first official world record in 1929. Women's speed skating was not very high-profile; in Skøytesportens stjerner (Stars of the skating sport), a Norwegian work from 1971, no female skaters are mentioned on the book's nearly 200 pages, though they had by then competed for nearly 30 years. The women's long-track speed skating was since dominated by East Germany and later reunified Germany, who have won 15 of 35 Olympic gold medals in women's long-track since 1984.

=== Technical developments ===
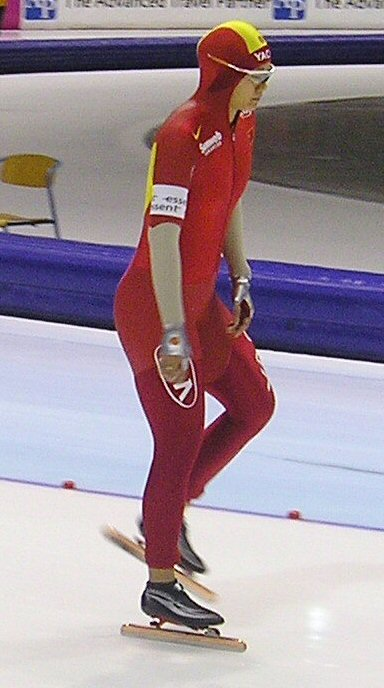
A skater in full body-covering suit

Artificial ice entered the long-track competitions with the 1960 Winter Olympics, and the competitions in 1956 on Lake Misurina were the last Olympic competitions on natural ice. 1960 also saw the first Winter Olympic competitions for women. Lidia Skoblikova won two gold medals in 1960 and four in 1964.

The clap skate, a new type of skate, which came into wide use in the 1990s

More aerodynamic skating suits were also developed, with Swiss skater Franz Krienbühl (who finished 8th on the Olympic 10,000 m at the age of 46) at the front of development. After a while, national teams took over development of "body suits". Suits and indoor skating, as well as the clap skate, has helped to lower long-track world records considerably; from 1971 to 2007, the average speed on the men's 1500 metres was raised from 45 to 52 km/h (28 to 32 mph). Similar speed increases are shown in the other distances.

=== Professionalism ===
After the 1972 season, European long-track skaters founded a professional league, International Speedskating League, which included Ard Schenk, three-time Olympic gold medallist in 1972, as well as five Norwegians, four other Dutchmen, three Swedes, and a few other skaters. Jonny Nilsson, 1963 world champion and Olympic gold medallist, was the driving force behind the league, which folded in 1974 for economic reasons, and ISU also excluded tracks hosting professional races from future international championships. The ISU later organised its own World Cup circuit with monetary prizes, and full-time professional teams developed in the Netherlands during the 1990s, which led them to a dominance on the men's side only challenged by Japanese 500 m racers and a couple of American allrounders.

== Racing ==
All races are held in pairs, (except for the Mass Start event), for which two lanes on the track are used. Skaters wear bands around their upper arm to identify which lane they started in. The colours are white for inner lane and red for outer lane. At the back straight, the skaters switch lanes, which causes them both to cover the same distance per lap. When both skaters emerge from the corner at exactly the same time, the person currently in the inner lane will have to let the outer lane pass in front of him. This usually does not cause any problems, as the person in the inner lane will generally move much faster than the person in the outer lane.

Occasionally, quartet starts are used, for the pragmatic and practical reason of allowing more skaters to complete their races inside a given amount of time. This involves having two pairs of skaters in the lanes at the same time, but with the second pair starting when the first have completed approximately half of the first lap. The skaters in the second pair will then wear yellow and blue arm bands instead of the usual white and red.

== Rink ==
A 400-meter speed skating rink

Skaters race on a two-lane oval rink similar in dimension to an outdoor athletics track. Indeed, an athletics track covered with ice can function as a speed skating track, such as on Bislett stadion in Oslo up to the 1980s. According to the rules of the International Skating Union, a standard track should be either 400 m or 333⅓ m long; 400 m is the standard used for all major competitions. Tracks of other, non-standard lengths, such 200 or 250 m, are also in use in some places for training and/or smaller local competitions. On standard tracks, the curves have a radius of 25–26 m in the inner lane, and each lane is 3–4 m wide.

=== Top international rinks ===
These rinks have hosted international events (World Cups or international senior championships) since 2005.

==== Indoor ====
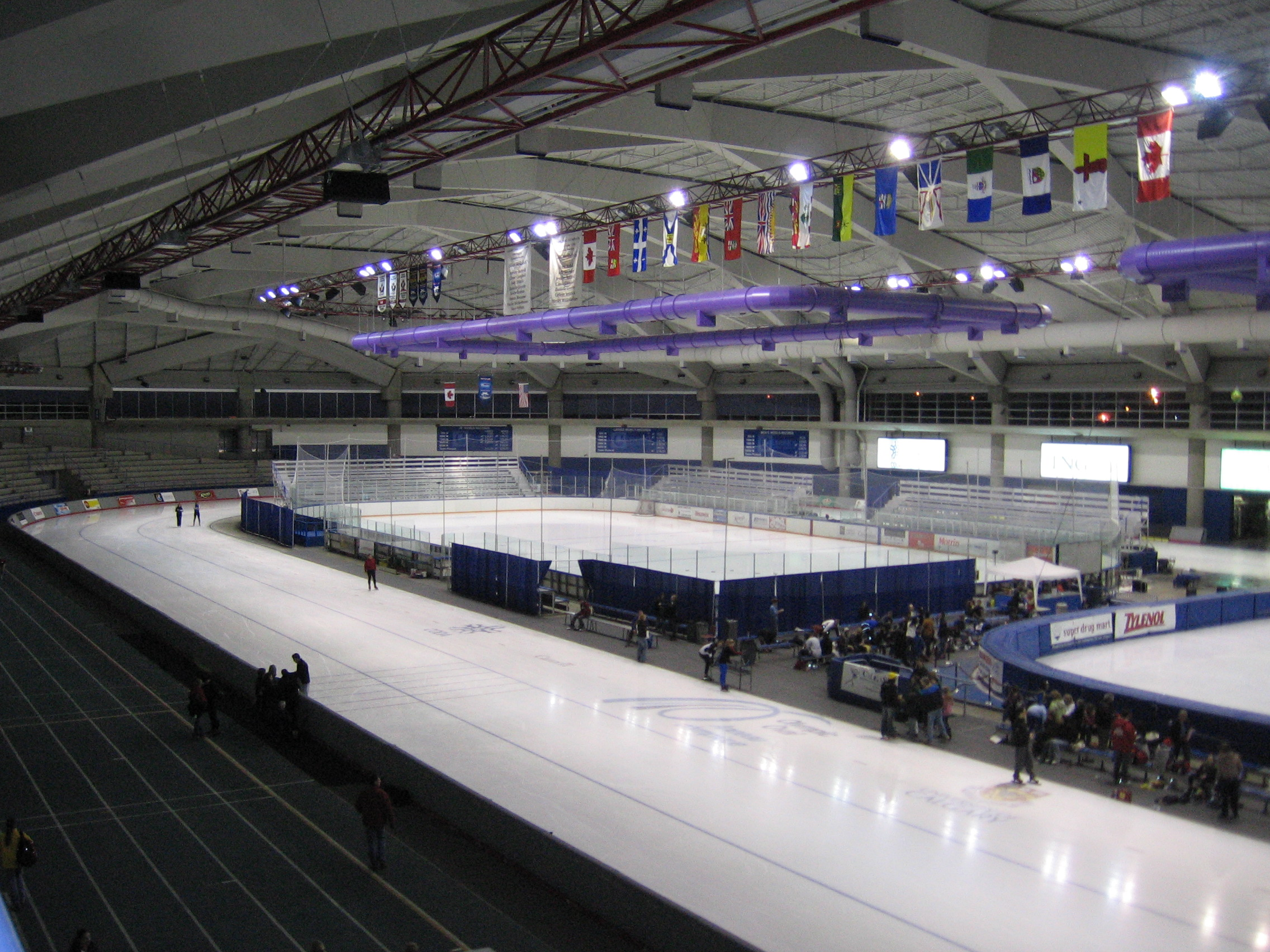
The long-track Olympic Oval in Calgary. Two hockey rinks fit inside the long-track rink.

- Gunda-Niemann-Stirnemann-Halle, Erfurt, Germany
- Heilongjiang Indoor Rink, Harbin, China
- Jilin Provincial Speed Skating Rink, Changchun, China
- Kometa Ice Rink, Kolomna, Russia
- Ice Palace Krylatskoye, Moscow, Russia
- M-Wave, Nagano, Japan
- Ludwig Schwabl Stadion, Inzell, Germany
- Oval Lingotto, Turin, Italy
- Olympic Oval, Calgary, Alberta, Canada
- Pettit National Ice Center, West Allis, Wisconsin, United States
- Richmond Olympic Oval, Richmond, British Columbia, Canada
- Sportforum Hohenschönhausen, Berlin, Germany
- Thialf, Heerenveen, Netherlands
- Utah Olympic Oval, Kearns, Utah, United States
- Vikingskipet, Hamar, Norway
- Alau Ice Palace, Nur-Sultan, Kazakhstan
- Centre de glaces, Québec City, Québec, Canada

Of these, the rinks in Calgary (~1100 meters above sea level) and Kearns (Salt Lake City) (1402 m) are located at a high altitude, which is believed to enable faster times than lowland rinks, due to decreased air resistance, and also due to there being less oxygen to create bubbles in the ice. The high altitude is believed to be part of the reason that the 2002 Salt Lake City games broke most of the previous speed-skating Olympic records.

After the completion of the 2010 Olympic Winter Games, the Richmond Olympic oval "will shed its long-track speed skating configuration for a multi-sport layout that will accommodate ice, track, court, paddling and fitness users".

==== Outdoor ====
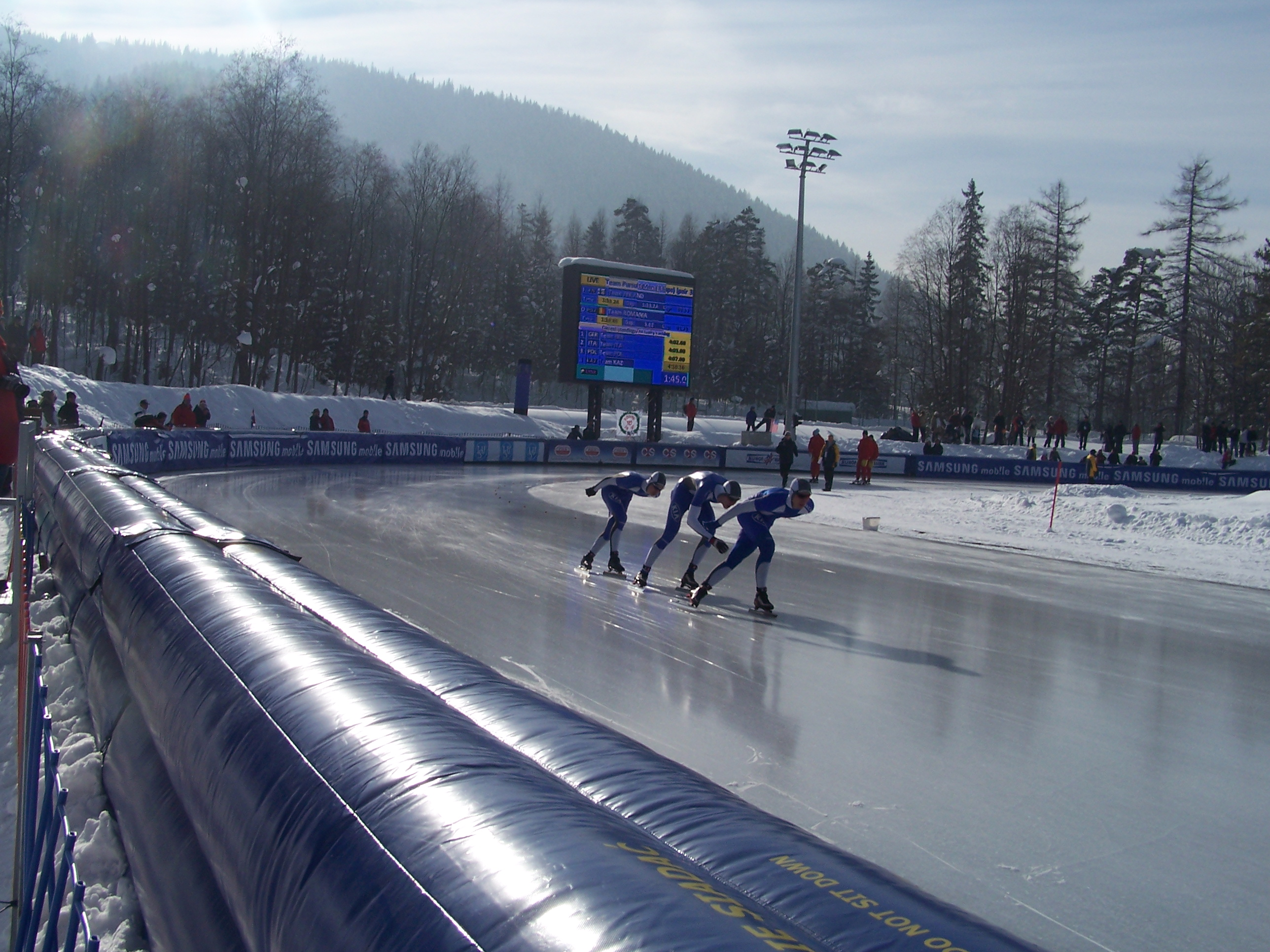
Ice rink COS OPO Zakopane

- Cuddy Family Midtown Park, Anchorage, AK, USA
- Ritten Kunsteisbahn, Klobenstein–Collalbo, Italy
- High-altitude skating rink Medeo, Kazakhstan
- Ice rink COS OPO Zakopane, Poland

All four of these are high-altitude rinks.

==== Combination with other sports ====
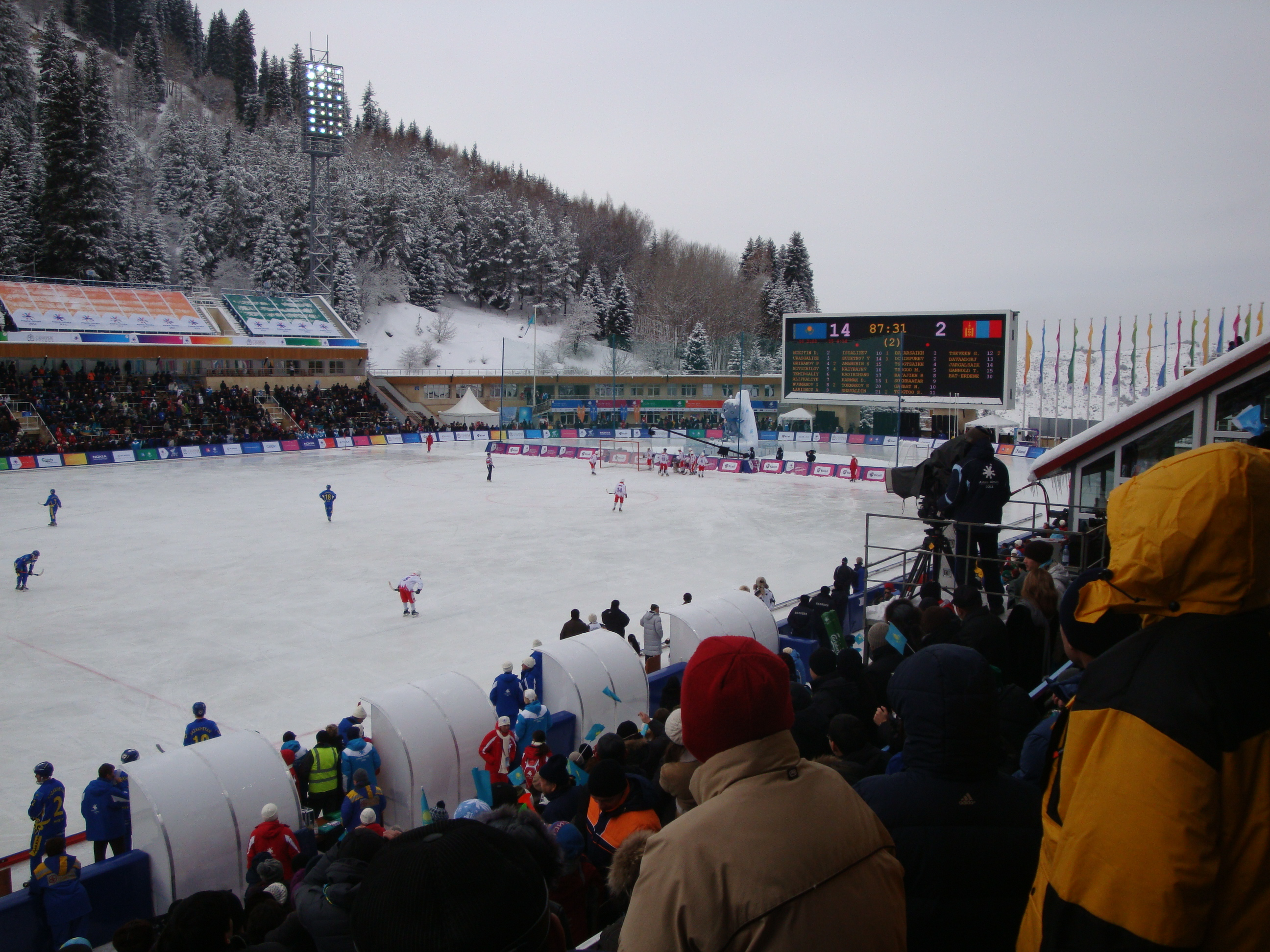
Medeu is also suitable for bandy

Many speed skating venues have ice hockey rinks or no ice area at all inside the oval. A few are suitable also for bandy, like Hamar Olympic Hall, Ice Palace Krylatskoye, and Medeu. Beijing National Speed Skating Oval in Beijing, China, which was built for the 2022 Winter Olympics, is also designed appropriately for that sport. There is a growing cooperation between International Skating Union and Federation of International Bandy, since both have an interest in more indoor venues with large ice surfaces being built. In Norway there is an agreement in place, stating that an indoor arena intended primarily for either bandy or long-track speed skating, shall have ice surface for the other sport as well.

== Equipment ==
There are two primary types of skates, traditional ice skates and clap skates. The clap skates were introduced by Viking around 1996. They were considered revolutionary as the blades are hinged at the front of the boot and detach at the heel, allowing the skater a more natural range of movement. This enables a longer stroke while keeping maximum contact with the ice. By the 1998 Winter Olympics, nearly all skaters used clap skates.

Both traditional and clap skates use long and straight blades compared to many other ice skating sports. Blades are about 1 mm thick and typically come in lengths from 13 to 18 inches (33 to 46 cm). Most competitive athletes use lengths between 15 and 17 inches (38 and 43 cm), depending on body size and personal preference. The Viking skating factory in Holland still counts as the world's biggest producer of clap skates.

A lot of attention is given to air resistance. The rules demand that the suits follow the natural shape of the body, preventing the use of, e.g., drop shaped helmets (as seen in cycling) or more inventive "Donald Duck" costumes. However, a lot of time and money is spent developing fabrics, cuts and seams that will reduce drag. Some skaters use low (no thicker than 3 mm) "aerodynamic strips" attached to their suits. These are intended to create turbulent flow in certain areas around the body.

Glasses or goggles may also be worn so that the wind does not dry out the eyes.

== Competition format ==
=== Allround ===
The oldest competition format still in place is the allround event, standardized in 1892 (see History above). Skaters skate four distances (for men: 500 m, 1500 m, 5000 m, and 10,000 m), and a ranking is made up based on the times skated on all of these distances. The method of scoring is the same for all combinations. All times are calculated back to 500 m times, so skating the 500 m in 40 seconds gives 40 points, while 1500 m (3×500 m) in 2 minutes (120 seconds, equivalent to 3×40 s) also gives 40 points. Points are calculated to three decimal places, and truncation is applied; the numbers are not rounded. The skater who has the fewest points wins the competition. This system is called samalog. An allround champion may not have won a single distance—such as Viktor Kosichkin in the 1962 World Championship—or he may win three distances but lose the overall title. Originally, three distance victories won one the championship, but the rules were changed after Rolf Falk-Larssen beat Tomas Gustafson at the 1983 World Championship despite the latter having less points. The ISU organizes an annual World Allround Speed Skating Championships.

=== Sprint championships ===
The sprint championships are two-day events where skaters run the 500 m and 1000 m on both days. The samalog system is again applied to crown the winner. To counter any systematic bias regarding inner versus outer lanes, skaters change start lanes from the first day to the second. Nations with active skaters arrange annual national sprint championships, and the ISU have held annual World Sprint Speedskating Championships for men and for women since 1970. Since 2017 a biannual European Allround Speedskating Championships is held which includes a sprint championship.

=== Single distances ===
A more basic form of speed skating consists of skating a single event. This is the format used for the World Single Distance Championships, which have been arranged since 1996, and the World Cup. The usual distances are the 500 m, 1000 m, 1500 m, 3000 m (women only), 5000 m and 10,000 m (men only), but some other distances are sometimes skated as well, such as 100 m and 1 mile. Women occasionally, but rarely, are given the opportunity to skate the 10,000 m, but outside the top-level championships.

The 500 m is usually skated with two runs, so that every skater has one race starting in the outer lane and one in the inner. This practice started with the first of the World Single Distance Championships in 1996, and with the 1998 Nagano Olympics; at all earlier Olympics, the 500 m was skated only once. The reason for skating this distance twice is that there is a small but statistically significant average advantage of starting in the inner lane; negotiating the last curve at high speed is typically more difficult in the inner lane than in the outer lane.

In addition to international championships, the International Skating Union has organised the Speed Skating World Cup since the 1985–86 season. The World Cup works by ranking skaters by cumulative score during the season, for each distance separately, at specially designated World Cup meets. More specifically, there is for each season a World Cup competition for the 500 m, 1000 m, 1500 m, and combined 5,000 m and 10,000 m, for men; and for the 500 m, 1000 m, 1500 m, and combined 3,000 m and 5,000 m, for women.

Starting with the 2011/2012 season the ISU decided to crown one "Grand World Cup Winner" for Men and Ladies as the aggregate of all the scores during the World Cup Season.

=== Team pursuit ===
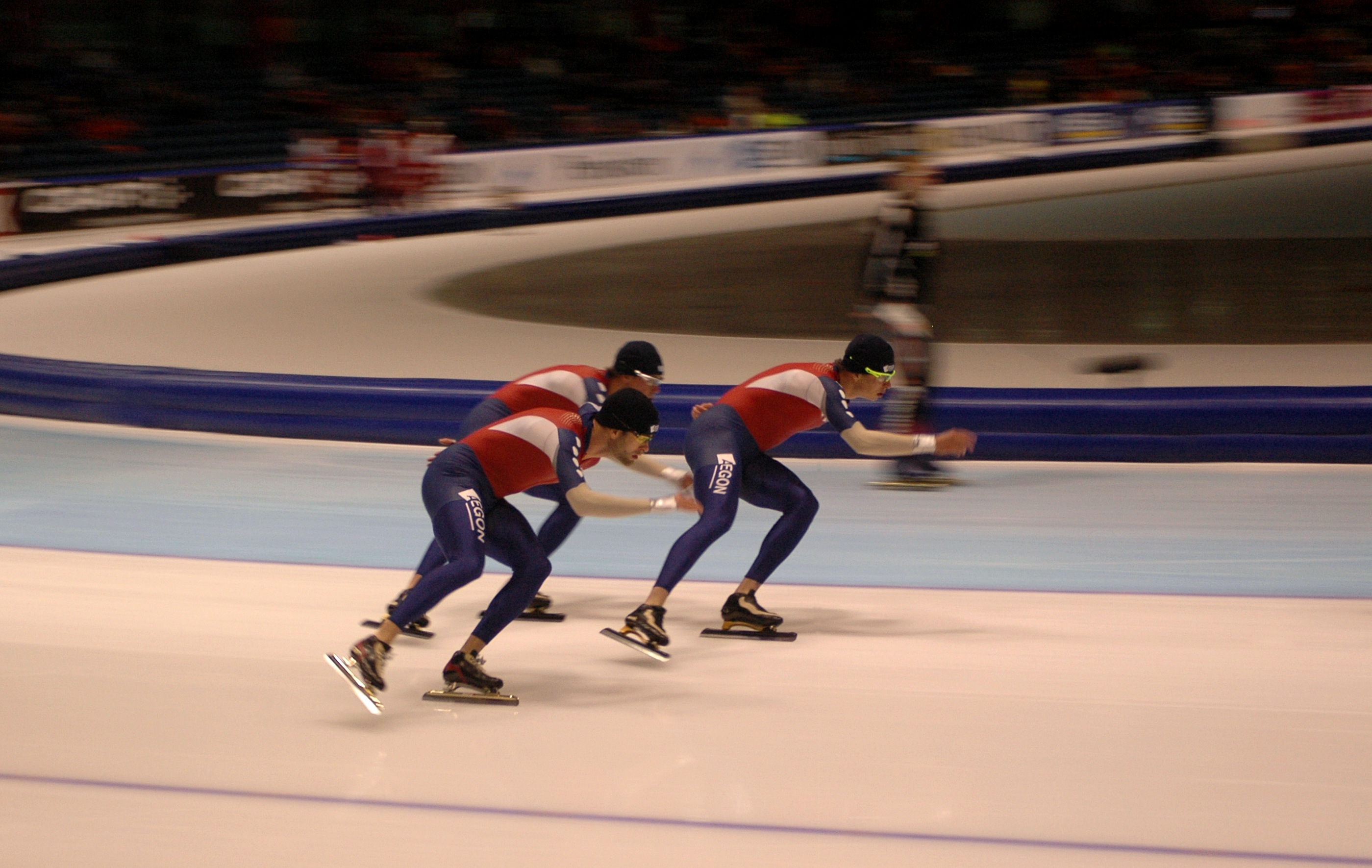
Wouter olde Heuvel, Erben Wennemars, and Sven Kramer training for team pursuit in Thialf.

The team pursuit is a team event in speed skating and is skated by teams of three skaters. Races resemble the team pursuit event in track cycling. Two teams race at a time, starting at a line in the middle of the straightaway. One team starts on each side of the track. Only the inner lane is used. The distance is eight laps for men and six for women. The team's time is the third skater to cross the finish line.

There are several formats for the team pursuit. The Olympic format is unusual in that it is a cup format, with several rounds of exclusion between two teams. In the World Cup and World Championships, one race is skated and the teams are ranked by their finishing time. In the Olympic format, a team that overtakes the other has automatically won the race and the remaining distance is not skated. In practice, the distance is so short that this rarely happens unless one team has a fall.

The team pursuit is a new event in major international competitions. The event was introduced at international level at the world junior championships around the turn of the millennium, and to the World Cup in 2003, but it was not considered an official ISU event until around 2004, and eventually introduced at the Olympics in 2006.

=== Marathon ===
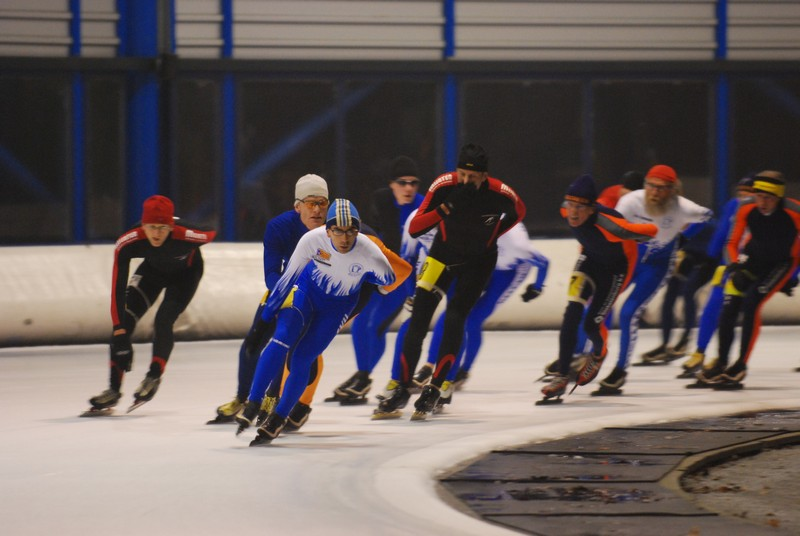
Marathon speed skating in the Netherlands in 2007

In marathon events, skaters skate long distances in a large group. When conducted at an ice rink oval, the distance is usually around 40 km, akin to the traditional marathon in running. When skated outdoors on natural ice, the distances can be as long as 200 km. An example of this is the famous Elfstedentocht (Eleven cities tour), which is irregularly held in the Netherlands. Alternative versions of this famous event are sometimes held abroad, e.g., in Finland and Canada.

In cold winters in the Netherlands, a "National championship" skating marathon on natural ice is organized if it meets the minimum requirement of 12-centimetre thickness. For the first time in 13 years, a Dutch championship ice-skating marathon on natural ice was held in January 2009, in the Oostvaardersplassen wetland near Lelystad in the province of Flevoland, an area of land reclaimed in the 1960s. The women competitors competed in 60 kilometres, and the men, 100 kilometres.

An example of a famous marathon outside the Netherlands is the International Big Rideau Lake Speed Skating Marathon in Portland, Ontario, Canada.

== Notable skaters ==
The following is the list of athletes who have won the following competitions at least five times in individual events.

- Olympic Winter Games
- World All-Round Speed Skating Championships
- World Sprint Speed Skating Championships

As its inclusion would place the athletes who have been active before 1996 at a significant disadvantage, World Single Distance Championships are not included as a primary component of the list, though individual achievements in that competition are noted when applicable. The team pursuit, introduced at the 2006 Olympics and the 2005 World Single Distance Championships, has been left out for a more balanced comparison and to focus on individual achievements.

=== Men ===
Athlete	Nation	Born– Died	Olympics				World Allround Championships				World Sprint Championships				Previous three combined				World Single Distance Champ.				Total				
Athlete	Nation	Born– Died				Gold medal	Silver medal	Bronze medal	Total	Gold medal	Silver medal	Bronze medal	Total	Gold medal	Silver medal	Bronze medal	Total				Total	Gold medal	Silver medal	Bronze medal	Total		Total
Sven Kramer	Netherlands	1986	3	2	0	5	9	0	3	12	0	0	0	0	12	2	3	17	13	2	2	17	25	4	5	34	
Eric Heiden	United States	1958	5	0	0	5	3	1	0	4	4	0	0	4	12	1	0	13	-	-	-	-	12	1	0	13	
Clas Thunberg	Finland	1893–1973	5	1	1	7	5	1	1	7	-	-	-	-	10	2	2	14	-	-	-	-	10	2	2	14	
Ivar Ballangrud	Norway	1904–1969	4	2	1	7	4	4	3	11	-	-	-	-	8	6	4	18	-	-	-	-	8	6	4	18	
Johann Olav Koss	Norway	1968	4	1	0	5	3	1	1	5	0	0	0	0	7	2	1	10	-	-	-	-	7	2	1	10	
Ard Schenk	Netherlands	1944	3	1	0	4	3	2	2	7	0	0	2	2	6	3	4	13	-	-	-	-	6	3	4	13	
Igor Zhelezovski	Belarus	1963- 2021	0	1	1	2	0	0	0	0	6	0	1	7	6	1	2	9	-	-	-	-	6	1	2	9	
Hjalmar Andersen	Norway	1923–2013	3	0	0	3	3	0	0	3	-	-	-	-	6	0	0	6	-	-	-	-	6	0	0	6	
Shani Davis	United States	1982	2	2	0	4	2	1	1	4	1	1	2	4	5	4	3	12	7	3	3	13	12	7	6	25	
Oscar Mathisen	Norway	1888–1954	-	-	-	-	5	1	0	6	-	-	-	-	5	1	0	6	-	-	-	-	5	1	0	6	

=== Women ===
Athlete	Nation	Born– Died	Olympics				World Allround Championships				World Sprint Championships				Previous three combined				World Single Distance Champ.				Total				
Athlete	Nation	Born– Died				Gold medal	Silver medal	Bronze medal	Total	Gold medal	Silver medal	Bronze medal	Total	Gold medal	Silver medal	Bronze medal	Total				Total	Gold medal	Silver medal	Bronze medal	Total		Total
Karin Enke	East Germany	1961	3	4	1	8	5	2	0	7	6	2	0	8	14	8	1	23	-	-	-	-	14	8	1	23	
Gunda Niemann-Stirnemann	Germany	1966	3	4	1	8	8	2	0	10	0	0	0	0	11	6	1	18	11	3	0	14	22	9	1	32	
Ireen Wüst	Netherlands	1986	4	4	1	9	6	4	2	12	0	1	0	1	10	9	3	22	8	9	1	18	18	18	4	40	
Bonnie Blair	United States	1964	5	0	1	6	0	0	0	0	3	4	2	9	8	4	3	15	-	-	-	-	8	4	3	15	
Martina Sáblíková	Czech Republic	1987	3	2	1	6	5	2	1	8	0	0	0	0	8	4	2	14	16	4	0	20	24	8	2	34	
Lidiya Skoblikova	Soviet Union	1939	6	0	0	6	2	1	3	6	-	-	-	-	8	1	3	12	-	-	-	-	8	1	3	12	
Claudia Pechstein	Germany	1972	4	2	2	8	1	8	2	11	0	0	0	0	5	10	4	19	5	12	9	26	10	22	13	45	
Anni Friesinger-Postma	Germany	1977	1	0	2	3	3	1	1	5	1	2	0	3	5	3	3	11	11	9	1	21	16	12	4	32	
Monique Garbrecht-Enfeldt	Germany	1968	0	1	1	2	0	0	0	0	5	0	0	5	5	1	1	7	4	2	0	6	9	3	1	13	

== See also ==
- Ice skating
- Speed skating
- Ice rink
- List of world records in speed skating
- List of Olympic records in speed skating
- List of long-track speed skaters
