= Cathrine Grage =

Danish speed skater

Catherine Grage
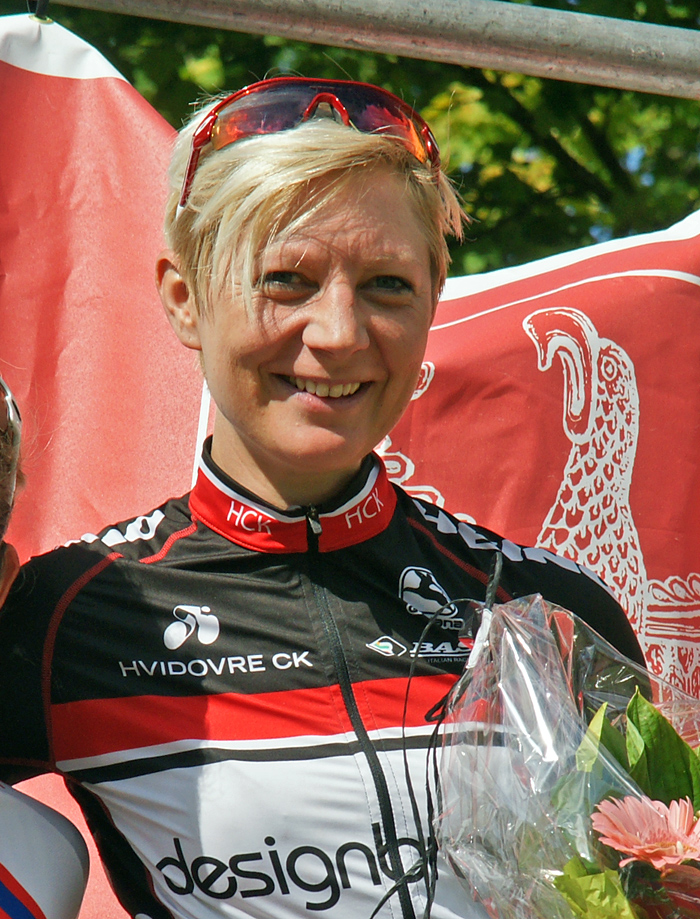
- Grage after cycling. Roskilde, 2012.

Personal information
- Born: Catherine Marie Grange; 13 October 1976 (age 50)
- Relative: George Falcke (great grandfather)

Sport
- Country: Denmark
- Sport: Speed skating (2005–2011); Inline skating (2003–2006); Cycling (2011–present)

Achievements and titles
- Olympic finals: 2010 Winter Olympics

Cathrine Grage (born 13 October 1976) is a Danish speedskater, inline skater and cyclist. As of January 2012, Grage has set a total of 61 successive national records, and holds all of the Danish women's records in speed skating, at all distances. In addition, she holds various national samalogue records, though not all of these have been ratified by the Danish skating association.

== Career ==
Grange began inline skating at the age of 7. She began her competitive career in 2001, at the age of 25. Grage skated the World Inline Cup for two seasons. Her best results were 5th in Glarus and 11th in Seoul. She has more than 20 national titles on inline skates and she has won the Master World Championships one time and the Master European Championships 4 times. She participated in the European Championships in Heerde 2004, where she placed 8th on the 1,000 m and 13th in the points. Grage was on the Danish National team in Inline skating from 2003 to 2006.

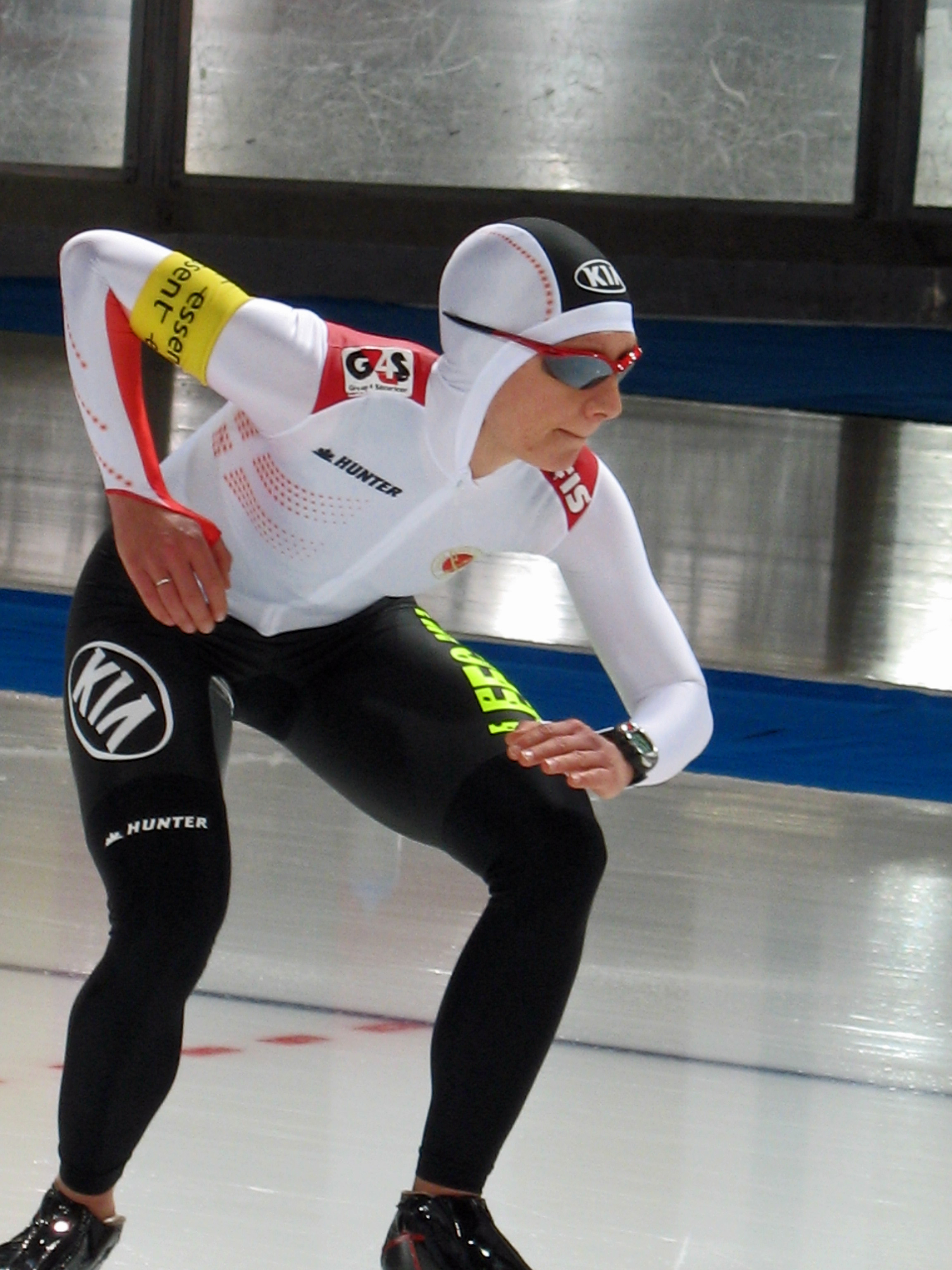
Cathrine Grage at 3.000 m start during World Cup 2008 in Berlin.

Grange made her speed skating debut in 2005, competing in Copenhagen. She regularly competed in the ISU Speed Skating World Cup from 2005 to 2011 and qualified each year for the European Speed Skating Championships from 2006 to 2011. Her best results in World Cup was the 7th fastest time overall on the 5,000 m. Her best result at European Championships was 13th on the 3000 m. In 2006, she became the first female All Round Danish Champion.

In 2008, Grage qualified for the World Championships Single Distances in Nagano, placing 14th on the 5,000m and 20th on the 3,000m races. During the pre-Olympic 2008–2009 season Grage did not place well at the ISU World Cup. In March 2009 in Calgary, however, she set six national records in just three days.

She participated in her first Olympic games in 2010 and competed in the women's 3000m event, as well as the 5000m. She was the first Dane to compete in the skating event at the Olympic games since 1964, and the first woman from Denmark to ever compete in the speed skating event. She placed 14th in the 5000m with a time of 7:23:83, which was a difference of +32.92 seconds off the gold. In the 3000m, she placed 27th with a time 4:20.93 and a difference of +18.40 off the gold. She again qualified for the World Championships Single Distances in 2011 in Inzell, placing 16th in the 5,000m and 19th in the 3,000m.

In 2011, Grage began competitively competing in cycling. In December 2011, she won a silver medal on the 3 km in a time of 3.49 at the Danish Championships in track cycling. In June 2012 she placed first at the Danish National Road Race Championships in both the mass start and time trial events. In 2013, she again placed second at the national championships in Cyclo cross cycling.

== National speedskating records ==
Personal records are denoted in bold.

| Event | Date | Result | Venue |
|---|---|---|---|
| 500-m | 26 February 2005 | 53.60 | Copenhagen |
| | 19 March 2005 | 51.79 | Groningen |
| | 6 November 2005 | 48.82 | Gothenburg |
| | 17 December 2005 | 47.10 | Inzell |
| | 18 December 2005 | 46.48 | Inzell |
| | 29 December 2005 | 45.56 | Hamar |
| | 10 January 2006 | 44.7 | Hamar |
| | 14 January 2006 | 43.91 | Hamar |
| | 10 March 2007 | 43.19 | Calgary |
| | 18 March 2009 | 42.99 | Calgary |
| | **19 December 2009** | **42.27** | **Calgary** |
| 1000-m | 5 November 2005 | 1:36.66 | Gothenburg |
| | 27 November 2005 | 1:35.54 | Karlstad |
| | 18 December 2005 | 1:32.18 | Inzell |
| | 29 December 2005 | 1:30.3 | Hamar |
| | 11 January 2006 | 1:25.9 | Hamar |
| | 16 March 2007 | 1:23.82 | Calgary |
| | 17 March 2007 | 1:23.03 | Calgary |
| | 19 March 2009 | 1:22.52 | Calgary |
| | **19 December 2009** | **1:21.68** | **Calgary** |
| 1500-m | 26 February 2005 | 2:42.25 | Copenhagen |
| | 6 November 2005 | 2:21.3 | Gothenburg |
| | 4 December 2005 | 2:10.73 | Heerenveen |
| | 29 October 2006 | 2:10.70 | Erfurt |
| | 13 January 2007 | 2:06.89 | Collalbo |
| | 4 February 2007 | 2:06.69 | Turin |
| | 14 March 2007 | 2:05.97 | Calgary |
| | 10 November 2007 | 2:04.31 | Salt Lake City |
| | 17 November 2007 | 2:03.21 | Calgary |
| | 18 March 2009 | 2:01.88 | Calgary |
| | **13 November 2009** | **1:59.86** | **Salt Lake City** |
| 3000-m | 26 February 2005 | 5:22.09 | Copenhagen(massstart) |
| | 5 November 2005 | 4:50.1 | Gothenburg |
| | 27 November 2005 | 4:46.84 | Karlstad |
| | 10 December 2005 | 4:32.56 | Turin |
| | 29 December 2005 | 4:32.45 | Hamar |
| | 14 January 2006 | 4:26.38 | Hamar |
| | 12 November 2006 | 4:23.67 | Heerenveen |
| | 18 November 2006 | 4:22.19 | Berlin |
| | 3 February 2007 | 4:21.33 | Turin |
| | 13 March 2007 | 4:18.51 | Calgary |
| | 3 November 2007 | 4:16.50 | Salt Lake City |
| | 11 November 2007 | 4:14.65 | Salt Lake City |
| | 16 November 2007 | 4:13.85 | Calgary |
| | 19 March 2009 | 4:11.86 | Calgary |
| | **12 November 2009** | **4:07.73** | **Salt Lake City** |
| 5000-m | 3 December 2005 | 7:38.79 | Heerenveen |
| | 22 October 2006 | 7:38.51 | Erfurt |
| | 18 February 2007 | 7:28.99 | Erfurt |
| | 14 March 2007 | 7:28.06 | Calgary |
| | 1 December 2007 | 7:20.45 | Kolomna |
| | **21 November 2007** | **7:10.24** | **Hamar** |
| 10,000-m | 4 March 2006 | 16:24.29 | Groningen |
| | 21 March 2006 | 15:48.86 | Heerenveen |
| | 15 March 2007 | 15:14.90 | Calgary |
| | **20 March 2009** | **15:11.84** | **Calgary** |
