= Speed skating at the 2026 Winter Olympics – Men's mass start =

Men's mass start at the XXV Olympic Winter Games
- Speed skating
- Venue: Milano Speed Skating Stadium, Milan
- Date: 21 February 2026
- Competitors: 29 from 17 nations
- Winning points: 68

Medalists
1st place, gold medalist(s)		Jorrit Bergsma	Netherlands
2nd place, silver medalist(s)		Viktor Hald Thorup	Denmark
3rd place, bronze medalist(s)		Andrea Giovannini	Italy

The men's mass start competition in speed skating at the 2026 Winter Olympics was held on 21 February, at the Milano Speed Skating Stadium in Milan. Jorrit Bergsma of the Netherlands won the event. Viktor Hald Thorup of Denmark won the silver medal, marking the second Winter Olympic medal for Denmark. Andrea Giovannini of Italy won bronze, his first individual Olympic medal.

== Background ==
The defending champion, Bart Swings, qualified for the event, as did the 2022 silver medalist, Chung Jae-won. The bronze medalist, Lee Seung-hoon, did not qualify. Before the Olympics, Jorrit Bergsma was leading the mass-start standings of the 2025–26 ISU Speed Skating World Cup, closely followed by Andrea Giovannini, who was also the 2025 World champion in mass start.

== Summary ==
Bergsma and Thorup escaped, and at some point were half a lap ahead of the pursuit group, which did not manage to catch them. Two laps before the finish, Bergsma escaped from Thorup. Giovannini was the first at the finish from the pursuit group.

== Results ==
=== Semifinals ===
Rank	Heat	Name	Country	Laps	Points					Time	Notes
Rank	Heat	Name	Country	Laps	S1	S2	S3	S4	Total	Time	Notes
1	1	Antoine Gélinas-Beaulieu	Canada	16				60	60	7:42.49	Q
2	1	Shomu Sasaki	Japan	16				40	40	7:42.61	Q
3	1	Chung Jae-won	South Korea	16	1			20	21	7:42.81	Q
4	1	Jordan Stolz	United States	16	3		2	6	11	7:43.81	Q
5	1	Mathieu Belloir	France	16				10	10	7:43.78	Q
6	1	Indra Médard	Belgium	16				3	3	7:44.03	Q
7	1	Jorrit Bergsma	Netherlands	16		3			3	7:47.81	Q
8	1	Viktor Hald Thorup	Denmark	16			3		3	8:01.77	Q
9	1	Daniele Di Stefano	Italy	16	2		1		3	8:05.12	
10	1	Li Wenhao	China	16		2			2	7:53.54	
11	1	Vladimir Semirunniy	Poland	16		1			1	7:46.08	
12	1	Sigurd Holbø Dyrset	Norway	16					0	7:44.18	
13	1	Felix Maly	Germany	16					0	7:46.65	
14	1	Alexander Farthofer	Austria	16					0	7:55.59	
1	2	Timothy Loubineaud	France	16			1	60	61	7:47.23	Q
2	2	Wu Yu	China	16				40	40	7:47.92	Q
3	2	Stijn van de Bunt	Netherlands	16		2	2	20	24	7:51.46	Q
4	2	Andrea Giovannini	Italy	16	3			10	13	7:51.81	Q
5	2	Bart Swings	Belgium	16	1			6	7	7:52.03	Q
6	2	Metoděj Jílek	Czech Republic	16		3	3		6	8:12.96	Q
7	2	Gabriel Odor	Austria	16				3	3	7:52.45	Q
8	2	Motonaga Arito	Japan	16	2				2	7:53.95	Q
9	2	Ethan Cepuran	United States	16		1			1	7:53.07	
10	2	Livio Wenger	Switzerland	16					0	7:52.74	
11	2	Daniel Hall	Canada	16					0	7:53.68	
12	2	Kim Min-seok	Hungary	16					0	7:53.86	
13	2	Cho Seung-min	South Korea	16					0	7:56.44	
14	2	Fridtjof Petzold	Germany	16					0	8:00.76	
15	2	Didrik Eng Strand	Norway	16					0	8:42.18	

=== Final ===
Rank	Name	Country	Laps	Points					Time
Rank	Name	Country	Laps	S1	S2	S3	S4	Total	Time
1st place, gold medalist(s)	Jorrit Bergsma	Netherlands	16	2	3	3	60	68	7:55.50
2nd place, silver medalist(s)	Viktor Hald Thorup	Denmark	16	3	2	2	40	47	8:00.52
3rd place, bronze medalist(s)	Andrea Giovannini	Italy	16	1			20	21	8:04.42
4	Jordan Stolz	United States	16				10	10	8:04.51
5	Chung Jae-won	South Korea	16				6	6	8:04.60
6	Antoine Gélinas-Beaulieu	Canada	16				3	3	8:04.76
7	Mathieu Belloir	France	16		1			1	8:12.96
8	Indra Médard	Belgium	16			1		1	8:26.25
9	Bart Swings	Belgium	16					0	8:05.37
10	Shomu Sasaki	Japan	16					0	8:05.56
11	Timothy Loubineaud	France	16					0	8:06.93
12	Gabriel Odor	Austria	16					0	8:07.08
13	Motonaga Arito	Japan	16					0	8:09.46
14	Metoděj Jílek	Czech Republic	16					0	8:10.90
15	Wu Yu	China	16					0	8:12.04
16	Stijn van de Bunt	Netherlands	16					0	8:18.60
