= 2023 World Single Distances Speed Skating Championships – Men's mass start =

Men's mass start at the 2023 World Single Distances Speed Skating Championships
- Venue: Thialf
- Location: Heerenveen, Netherlands
- Date: 4 March
- Competitors: 24 from 16 nations
- Winning points: 60

Medalists
gold medal	Bart Swings	Belgium
silver medal	Bart Hoolwerf	Netherlands
bronze medal	Andrea Giovannini	Italy

The Men's mass start competition at the 2023 World Single Distances Speed Skating Championships was held on 4 March 2023.

== Results ==
=== Semi-finals ===
The first eight racers from each semifinal advanced to the final.

==== Semi-final 1 ====
The race was started at 13:36.

Rank	Name	Country	Points	Time	Notes
1	Peter Michael	New Zealand	63	7:53.98	Q
2	Chung Jae-won	South Korea	40	8:00.32	Q
3	Connor Howe	Canada	20	8:00.49	Q
4	Livio Wenger	Switzerland	10	8:00.65	Q
5	Bart Swings	Belgium	10	8:00.80	Q
6	Jorrit Bergsma	Netherlands	8	8:01.39	Q
7	Daniele Di Stefano	Italy	4	8:13.41	Q
8	Conor McDermott-Mostowy	United States	2	8:15.38	Q
9	Viktor Hald Thorup	Denmark	0	8:05.36	
10	Felix Rijhnen	Germany	0	8:20.97	
11	Timothy Loubineaud	France	0	8:32.03	
12	Ryosuke Tsuchiya	Japan	0	7:35.96	

==== Semi-final 2 ====
The race was started at 13:52.

Rank	Name	Country	Points	Time	Notes
1	Kristian Ulekleiv	Norway	60	7:56.44	Q
2	Felix Maly	Germany	40	7:56.67	Q
3	Lee Seung-hoon	South Korea	20	7:56.87	Q
4	Ethan Cepuran	United States	10	7:57.42	Q
5	Kota Kikuchi	Japan	8	7:57.71	Q
6	Bart Hoolwerf	Netherlands	7	7:59.19	Q
7	Andrea Giovannini	Italy	5	8:00.40	Q
8	Gabriel Odor	Austria	4	7:59.22	Q
9	Hayden Mayeur	Canada	3	7:57.97	
10	Stefan Due Schmidt	Denmark	0	7:59.73	
11	Vitaliy Chshigolev	Kazakhstan	0	8:19.93	
12	Cong Zhenlong	China	0	8:20.27	

=== Final ===
The final was started at 16:58.

Rank	Name	Country	Points	Time
1st place, gold medalist(s)	Bart Swings	Belgium	60	7:30.99
2nd place, silver medalist(s)	Bart Hoolwerf	Netherlands	40	7:31.05
3rd place, bronze medalist(s)	Andrea Giovannini	Italy	23	7:31.09
4	Lee Seung-hoon	South Korea	10	7:31.36
5	Jorrit Bergsma	Netherlands	7	8:17.45
6	Kristian Ulekleiv	Norway	6	7:31.53
7	Daniele Di Stefano	Italy	6	7:31.56
8	Gabriel Odor	Austria	2	8:03.01
9	Livio Wenger	Switzerland	0	7:31.77
10	Ethan Cepuran	United States	0	7:31.85
11	Kota Kikuchi	Japan	0	7:31.94
12	Conor McDermott-Mostowy	United States	0	7:32.18
13	Felix Maly	Germany	0	7:32.73
14	Connor Howe	Canada	0	7:33.30
15	Chung Jae-won	South Korea	Did not finish	
	Peter Michael	New Zealand	Disqualified	
