= 2021 World Single Distances Speed Skating Championships – Men's mass start =

Men's mass start at the 2021 World Single Distances Speed Skating Championships
- Venue: Thialf
- Location: Heerenveen, Netherlands
- Date: 13 February
- Competitors: 24 from 17 nations
- Winning points: 60

Medalists
gold medal	Joey Mantia	United States
silver medal	Arjan Stroetinga	Netherlands
bronze medal	Bart Swings	Belgium

The Men's mass start competition at the 2021 World Single Distances Speed Skating Championships was held on 13 February 2021.

== Results ==
=== Semi-finals ===
The first eight racers from each semifinal advanced to the final.

==== Semi-final 1 ====
The race was started at 14:34.

Rank	Name	Country	Points	Time	Notes
1	Danila Semerikov	Russian Skating Union	67	7:38.300	Q
2	Gabriel Odor	Austria	48	7:48.440	Q
3	Jordan Belchos	Canada	22	7:55.820	Q
4	Jorrit Bergsma	Netherlands	10	8:00.440	Q
5	Bart Swings	Belgium	6	8:00.530	Q
6	Haralds Silovs	Latvia	3	8:00.740	Q
7	Kristian Ulekleiv	Norway	0	8:01.120	Q
8	Kierryn Hughes	New Zealand	0	6:17.260	Q
	Ian Quinn	United States	Disqualified		
	Marcin Bachanek	Poland	Disqualified		
	Philip Due Schmidt	Denmark	Disqualified		
	Bakdaulet Sagatov	Kazakhstan	Disqualified		

==== Semi-final 2 ====
The race was started at 14:50.

Rank	Name	Country	Points	Time	Notes
1	Peter Michael	New Zealand	63	7:43.080	Q
2	Ruslan Zakharov	Russian Skating Union	44	7:43.240	Q
3	Joey Mantia	United States	20	7:48.920	Q
4	Arjan Stroetinga	Netherlands	12	7:49.210	Q
5	Livio Wenger	Switzerland	6	7:49.380	Q
6	Stefan Due Schmidt	Denmark	3	7:49.570	Q
7	Andrea Giovannini	Italy	3	7:50.180	Q
8	Artur Janicki	Poland	3	7:50.970	Q
9	Timothy Loubineaud	France	2	7:51.080	
10	Dmitry Morozov	Kazakhstan	1	7:58.500	
11	Evgeniy Bolgov	Belarus	0	7:18.980	
12	Stefan Emele	Germany	0	4:00.550	

=== Final ===
The final was started at 17:11.

Rank	Name	Country	Points	Time
1st place, gold medalist(s)	Joey Mantia	United States	60	7:32.470
2nd place, silver medalist(s)	Arjan Stroetinga	Netherlands	40	7:32.770
3rd place, bronze medalist(s)	Bart Swings	Belgium	21	7:32.830
4	Jordan Belchos	Canada	10	7:33.070
5	Peter Michael	New Zealand	9	7:47.080
6	Livio Wenger	Switzerland	6	7:33.150
7	Jorrit Bergsma	Netherlands	4	7:34.410
8	Artur Janicki	Poland	4	7:52.460
9	Danila Semerikov	Russian Skating Union	3	7:34.020
10	Gabriel Odor	Austria	0	7:34.590
11	Andrea Giovannini	Italy	0	7:36.080
12	Stefan Due Schmidt	Denmark	0	7:40.270
13	Haralds Silovs	Latvia	0	7:45.820
14	Kierryn Hughes	New Zealand	0	7:46.450
15	Ruslan Zakharov	Russian Skating Union	0	8:11.330
16	Kristian Ulekleiv	Norway	0	8:23.620
