= Speed skating at the 2022 Winter Olympics – Men's mass start =

Speed skating event at the 2022 Winter Olympics

Men's mass start at the XXIV Olympic Winter Games
- Speed skating
- Venue: National Speed Skating Oval, Beijing
- Date: 19 February 2022
- Competitors: 30 from 19 nations
- Winning points: 63

Medalists
1st place, gold medalist(s)		Bart Swings	Belgium
2nd place, silver medalist(s)		Chung Jae-won	South Korea
3rd place, bronze medalist(s)		Lee Seung-hoon	South Korea

The men's mass start competition in speed skating at the 2022 Winter Olympics was held on 19 February 2022, at the National Speed Skating Oval ("Ice Ribbon") in Beijing. Bart Swings of Belgium, the 2018 silver medalist, won the event. This was the first gold medal for Belgium at the Winter Olympics since 1948. Chung Jae-won of South Korea won the silver medal, his first individual Olympic medal, and Lee Seung-hoon, the defending champion, bronze.

The 2018 bronze medalist, Koen Verweij, did not qualify. Joey Mantia is the 2021 World Single Distances champion in mass start, with Arjan Stroetinga and Swings being the silver and bronze medalists, respectively. Swings was leading the 2021–22 ISU Speed Skating World Cup at long distances with three events completed before the Olympics, followed by Ruslan Zakharov and Andrea Giovannini.

== Qualification ==
A total of 24 entry quotas were available for the event, with a maximum of two athletes per NOC. All 24 athletes qualified through their performance at the 2021–22 ISU Speed Skating World Cup.

The qualification time for the event (1:57.50 (1500 m)) was released on July 1, 2021, and was unchanged from 2018. Skaters had the time period of July 1, 2021 – January 16, 2022 to achieve qualification times at valid International Skating Union (ISU) events.

== Results ==
=== Semifinals ===
Rank	Heat	Name	Country	Laps	Points					Time	Notes
Rank	Heat	Name	Country	Laps	S1	S2	S3	S4	Total	Time	Notes
1	1	Kristian Ulekleiv	Norway	16				60	60	7:56.67	Q
2	1	Bart Swings	Belgium	16	2		2	40	44	7:56.74	Q
3	1	Ning Zhongyan	China	16				20	20	7:56.75	Q
4	1	Chung Jae-won	South Korea	16	1		1	10	12	7:56.76	Q
5	1	Daniil Aldoshkin	ROC	16				6	6	7:56.83	Q
6	1	Antoine Gélinas-Beaulieu	Canada	16				3	3	7:56.93	Q
7	1	Sven Kramer	Netherlands	16		3			3	7:58.22	Q
8	1	Seitaro Ichinohe	Japan	16			3		3	7:58.54	Q
9	1	Haralds Silovs	Latvia	16	3				3	7:59.50	
10	1	Dmitriy Morozov	Kazakhstan	16		2			2	8:08.73	
11	1	Michele Malfatti	Italy	16		1			1	8:02.09	
12	1	Stefan Due Schmidt	Denmark	16					0	7:58.01	
13	1	Ian Quinn	United States	16					0	7:58.03	
14	1	Zbigniew Bródka	Poland	16					0	8:17.49	
	1	Felix Rijhnen	Germany	Disqualified							
1	2	Andrea Giovannini	Italy	16				60	60	7:43.58	Q
2	2	Lee Seung-hoon	South Korea	16				40	40	7:43.63	Q
3	2	Livio Wenger	Switzerland	16				20	20	7:44.08	Q
4	2	Gabriel Odor	Austria	16				10	10	7:44.28	Q
5	2	Jordan Belchos	Canada	16	2	3	3		8	7:46.05	Q
6	2	Ryosuke Tsuchiya	Japan	16	3	2	2		7	7:48.43	Q
7	2	Joey Mantia	United States	16				6	6	7:44.37	Q
8	2	Jorrit Bergsma	Netherlands	16				3	3	7:44.42	Q
9	2	Peter Michael	New Zealand	16	1	1			2	7:58.04	
10	2	Viktor Hald Thorup	Denmark	16			1		1	8:21.94	
11	2	Artur Janicki	Poland	16					0	7:44.48	
12	2	Wang Haotian	China	16					0	7:46.30	
13	2	Ignat Golovatsiuk	Belarus	16					0	7:53.59	
14	2	Peder Kongshaug	Norway	14					0	6:55.43	
15	2	Ruslan Zakharov	ROC	5					0	2:49.52	

=== Final ===
Lee and Mantia were separated by a photo-finish, clocking an identical time.

Rank	Name	Country	Laps	Points					Time
Rank	Name	Country	Laps	S1	S2	S3	S4	Total	Time
1st place, gold medalist(s)	Bart Swings	Belgium	16		2	1	60	63	7:47.11
2nd place, silver medalist(s)	Chung Jae-won	South Korea	16				40	40	7:47.18
3rd place, bronze medalist(s)	Lee Seung-hoon	South Korea	16				20	20	7:47.204
4	Joey Mantia	United States	16				10	10	7:47.206
5	Daniil Aldoshkin	ROC	16				6	6	7:47.59
6	Ryosuke Tsuchiya	Japan	16		3	3		6	7:58.82
7	Livio Wenger	Switzerland	16		1		3	4	7:47.86
8	Seitaro Ichinohe	Japan	16	3				3	7:48.56
9	Jorrit Bergsma	Netherlands	16	1		2		3	7:50.25
10	Gabriel Odor	Austria	16	2				2	8:10.46
11	Andrea Giovannini	Italy	16					0	7:47.93
12	Ning Zhongyan	China	16					0	7:48.07
13	Jordan Belchos	Canada	16					0	7:48.14
14	Kristian Ulekleiv	Norway	16					0	7:48.52
15	Antoine Gélinas-Beaulieu	Canada	16					0	8:13.35
16	Sven Kramer	Netherlands	14					0	7:13.37
