= 2024 World Single Distances Speed Skating Championships – Men's mass start =

Men's mass start at the 2024 World Single Distances Speed Skating Championships
- Venue: Olympic Oval
- Location: Calgary, Canada
- Dates: February 17
- Competitors: 24 from 15 nations

Medalists
gold medal	Bart Swings	Belgium
silver medal	Antoine Gélinas-Beaulieu	Canada
bronze medal	Livio Wenger	Switzerland

The Men's mass start competition at the 2024 World Single Distances Speed Skating Championships was held February 17, 2024.

== Results ==
=== Semi-finals ===
The first eight racers from each semifinal advance to the final.

==== Semi-final 1 ====
The race was started at 13:18.

Rank	Name	Country	Points	Time	Notes
1	Shomu Sasaki	Japan	65	8:08.69	
2	Bart Swings	Belgium	46	8:08.91	
3	Jake Weidemann	Canada	24	8:14.82	
4	Livio Wenger	Switzerland	10	8:27.80	
5	Gabriel Odor	Austria	6	8:27.98	
6	Andrea Giovannini	Italy	3	8:28.01	
7	Timothy Loubineaud	France	3	8:29.80	
8	Ethan Cepuran	United States		8:28.09	
9	Allan Dahl Johansson	Norway		8:28.12	
10	Marcel Bosker	Netherlands		8:28.90	
11	Fridtjof Petzold	Germany		8:31.47	
12	Lee Seung-hoon	South Korea		8:33.97	

==== Semi-final 2 ====
The race was started at 13:32.

Rank	Name	Country	Points	Time	Notes
1	Felix Maly	Germany	62	7:55.22	
2	Peter Michael	New Zealand	46	7:55.22	
3	Bart Hoolwerf	Netherlands	22	8:20.26	
4	Mathieu Belloir	France	10	8:20.35	
5	Antoine Gélinas-Beaulieu	Canada	9	8:20.46	
6	Chung Jae-won	South Korea	3	8:20.57	
7	Conor McDermott-Mostowy	United States	1	7:42.69	
8	Daniele Di Stefano	Italy		1:52.50	
–	Artur Janicki	Poland	Disqualified		
–	Kristian Gamme Ulekleiv	Norway	Disqualified		
–	Kota Kikuchi	Japan	Disqualified		
–	Vitaliy Chshigolev	Kazakhstan	Disqualified		

=== Final ===
The race was started at 16:05.

Rank	Name	Country	Points	Time
1st place, gold medalist(s)	Bart Swings	Belgium	63	8:40.67
2nd place, silver medalist(s)	Antoine Gélinas-Beaulieu	Canada	40	8:40.70
3rd place, bronze medalist(s)	Livio Wenger	Switzerland	20	8:40.77
4	Andrea Giovannini	Italy	11	8:41.16
5	Bart Hoolwerf	Netherlands	6	8:42.30
6	Peter Michael	New Zealand	5	8:46.92
7	Daniele Di Stefano	Italy	4	8:42.43
8	Gabriel Odor	Austria	3	8:24.29
9	Mathieu Belloir	France	3	8:30.60
10	Felix Maly	Germany	2	8:47.45
11	Chung Jae-won	South Korea		8:43.09
12	Ethan Cepuran	United States		8:43.38
13	Timothy Loubineaud	France		8:43.40
14	Conor McDermott-Mostowy	United States		8:55.66
15	Jake Weidemann	Canada		8:53.06
16	Shomu Sasaki	Japan		7:52.89
