= 2022 European Speed Skating Championships – Men's mass start =

Men's mass start at the 2022 European Speed Skating Championships
- Venue: Thialf
- Location: Heerenveen, Netherlands
- Dates: 9 January
- Competitors: 24 from 16 nations
- Winning points: 61

Medalists
gold medal	Bart Swings	Belgium
silver medal	Livio Wenger	Switzerland
bronze medal	Ruslan Zakharov	Russia

The men's mass start competition at the 2022 European Speed Skating Championships was held on 9 January 2022.

== Results ==
The race was started at 17:09.

Rank	Name	Country	Points	Time
1st place, gold medalist(s)	Bart Swings	Belgium	61	7:33.03
2nd place, silver medalist(s)	Livio Wenger	Switzerland	40	7:33.17
3rd place, bronze medalist(s)	Ruslan Zakharov	Russia	20	7:33.51
4	Kristian Ulekleiv	Norway	10	7:33.67
5	Andrea Giovannini	Italy	6	7:33.77
6	Jorrit Bergsma	Netherlands	5	7:34.12
7	Gabriel Odor	Austria	3	7:41.81
8	Philip Due Schmidt	Denmark	3	7:48.47
9	Timothy Loubineaud	France	2	7:35.82
10	Yahor Damaratski	Belarus	2	7:49.18
11	Diogo Marreiros	Portugal	1	7:51.69
12	Evgeniy Bolgov	Belarus	1	8:05.73
13	Artur Janicki	Poland	0	7:35.52
14	Viktor Hald Thorup	Denmark	0	7:35.74
15	Mathieu Belloir	France	0	7:35.91
16	Danila Semerikov	Russia	0	7:35.94
17	Peder Kongshaug	Norway	0	7:36.14
18	Marcel Bosker	Netherlands	0	7:37.20
19	Felix Rijhnen	Germany	0	7:37.99
20	Lukáš Steklý	Czech Republic	0	8:01.55
21	Zbigniew Bródka	Poland	0	8:01.93
22	Cosmin Nedelea	Romania	0	DNF
23	Wilhelm Ekensskär	Sweden	0	DNF
24	Oliver Grob	Switzerland	0	DNF
