= 2025 World Single Distances Speed Skating Championships – Men's mass start =

Men's mass start at the 2025 World Single Distances Speed Skating Championships
- Venue: Vikingskipet
- Location: Hamar, Norway
- Dates: 15 March
- Competitors: 24 from 17 nations
- Winning points: 60

Medalists
gold medal	Andrea Giovannini	Italy
silver medal	Lee Seung-hoon	South Korea
bronze medal	Bart Swings	Belgium

The Men's mass start competition at the 2025 World Single Distances Speed Skating Championships took place on 15 March 2025.

== Results ==
The race was started at 16:48.

Rank	Name	Country	Laps	Points	Time
1st place, gold medalist(s)	Andrea Giovannini	Italy	16	60	7:56.47
2nd place, silver medalist(s)	Lee Seung-hoon	South Korea	16	40	7:56.52
3rd place, bronze medalist(s)	Bart Swings	Belgium	16	20	7:56.69
4	Bart Hoolwerf	Netherlands	16	10	7:56.70
5	Ethan Cepuran	United States	16	6	7:57.37
6	Timothy Loubineaud	France	16	5	8:08.28
7	Indra Médard	Belgium	16	5	8:12.61
8	Daniele Di Stefano	Italy	16	3	7:57.59
9	Gabriel Odor	Austria	16	3	8:31.70
10	Metoděj Jílek	Czech Republic	16	2	8:05.55
11	Chung Jae-won	South Korea	16	0	7:57.62
12	Livio Wenger	Switzerland	16	0	7:58.79
13	Shomu Sasaki	Japan	16	0	7:59.27
14	Viktor Hald Thorup	Denmark	16	0	8:02.33
15	Liu Hanbin	China	16	0	8:06.93
16	David La Rue	Canada	16	0	8:06.99
17	Fridtjof Petzold	Germany	16	0	8:11.52
18	Jorrit Bergsma	Netherlands	16	0	8:12.26
19	Szymon Palka	Poland	16	0	8:19.35
20	Peter Michael	New Zealand	16	0	8:19.58
21	Allan Dahl Johansson	Norway	16	0	8:22.42
22	Marcin Bachanek	Poland	15	2	7:57.97
23	Mathieu Belloir	France	14	1	7:31.26
24	Felix Maly	Germany	13	0	7:00.82
