= 2015 World Single Distance Speed Skating Championships – Men's mass start =

Men's mass start at the 2015 World Single Distance Speed Skating Championships
- Venue: Thialf, Heerenveen
- Date: 15 February 2015
- Competitors: 24 from 16 nations

Medalists
gold medal	Arjan Stroetinga	Netherlands
silver medal	Fabio Francolini	Italy
bronze medal	Alexis Contin	France

The Men's mass start race of the 2015 World Single Distance Speed Skating Championships was held on 15 February 2015.

== Results ==
The race was started at 16:04.

Rank	Name	Country	Time	Points
1st place, gold medalist(s)	Arjan Stroetinga	NED	7:30.64	60
2nd place, silver medalist(s)	Fabio Francolini	ITA	7:30.70	40
3rd place, bronze medalist(s)	Alexis Contin	FRA	7:30.72	20
4	Haralds Silovs	LAT	8:02.21	8
5	Andrea Giovannini	ITA	7:56.00	6
6	Peter Michael	NZL	7:41.43	5
7	Tyler Derraugh	CAN	7:46.71	3
8	Jeffrey Swider-Peltz	USA	7:58.12	3
9	Marco Weber	GER	7:35.82	1
10	Shane Williamson	JPN	8:04.67	1
11	Bart Swings	BEL	7:30.83	0
12	Lee Seung-hoon	KOR	7:31.29	0
13	Kim Cheol-min	KOR	7:31.81	0
14	Håvard Bøkko	NOR	7:33.16	0
15	Sun Longjiang	CHN	7:33.19	0
16	Patrick Beckert	GER	7:34.04	0
17	Robert Watson	CAN	7:36.66	0
18	Ryosuke Tsuchiya	JPN	7:38.89	0
19	Jorrit Bergsma	NED	7:44.99	0
20	Yevgeny Seryaev	RUS	7:51.88	0
21	Armin Hager	AUT	7:56.35	0
22	Roland Cieślak	POL	7:59.40	0
23	Danila Semerikov	RUS	7:07.34	0
24	Bram Smallenbroek	AUT	4:33.77	0
