= 2016 World Single Distances Speed Skating Championships – Men's mass start =

Men's mass start at the 2016 World Single Distances Speed Skating Championships
- Venue: Kolomna Speed Skating Center, Kolomna
- Date: 14 February 2016
- Competitors: 24 from 16 nations
- Winning time: 7:18.26

Medalists
gold medal	Lee Seung-hoon	South Korea
silver medal	Arjan Stroetinga	Netherlands
bronze medal	Alexis Contin	France

The Men's mass start race of the 2016 World Single Distances Speed Skating Championships was held on 14 February 2016.

== Results ==
The race was started at 17:15.

Rank	Name	Country	Time	Points
1st place, gold medalist(s)	Lee Seung-hoon	KOR	7:18.26	60
2nd place, silver medalist(s)	Arjan Stroetinga	NED	7:18.32	41
3rd place, bronze medalist(s)	Alexis Contin	FRA	7:18.41	20
4	Fabio Francolini	ITA	7:19.35	5
5	Shota Nakamura	JPN	7:38.49	5
6	Reyon Kay	NZL	7:26.47	3
7	Peter Michael	NZL	7:31.60	3
8	Shane Williamson	JPN	7:38.42	3
9	Livio Wenger	SUI	7:40.87	1
10	Jordan Belchos	CAN	7:20.36	0
11	Nicola Tumolero	ITA	7:20.99	0
12	Joey Mantia	USA	7:21.39	0
13	Haralds Silovs	LAT	7:21.72	0
14	Sverre Lunde Pedersen	NOR	7:23.98	0
15	K. C. Boutiette	USA	7:25.31	0
16	Linus Heidegger	AUT	7:27.89	0
17	Sun Longjiang	CHN	7:37.12	0
18	Mathias Vosté	BEL	7:37.59	0
19	Kim Cheol-min	KOR	6:54.89	0
20	Bart Swings	BEL	6:55.02	0
21	Jorrit Bergsma	NED	6:40.19	0
22	Viktor-Hald Thorup	DEN	5:18.86	0
23	Stefan Waples	CAN	4:50.11	0
24	Danila Semerikov	RUS	1:05.84	0
