= Speed skating at the 2022 Winter Olympics – Men's team pursuit =

Speed skating event at the 2022 Winter Olympics

Men's team pursuit at the XXIV Olympic Winter Games
- Speed skating
- Venue: National Speed Skating Oval, Beijing
- Date: 13 and 15 February 2022
- Competitors: 27 from 8 nations
- Teams: 8
- Winning time: 3:38.08

Medalists
1st place, gold medalist(s)		Hallgeir Engebråten; Peder Kongshaug; Sverre Lunde Pedersen	Norway
2nd place, silver medalist(s)		Daniil Aldoshkin; Sergey Trofimov; Ruslan Zakharov	ROC
3rd place, bronze medalist(s)		Ethan Cepuran; Casey Dawson; Emery Lehman; Joey Mantia	United States

The men's team pursuit competition in speed skating at the 2022 Winter Olympics was held on 13 February (semifinals) and 15 February (final), at the National Speed Skating Oval ("Ice Ribbon") in Beijing. Hallgeir Engebråten, Peder Kongshaug and Sverre Lunde Pedersen, representing Norway, won the event. Norway defended their 2018 title, but Pedersen was the only athlete returning to the podium. Daniil Aldoshkin, Sergey Trofimov and Ruslan Zakharov, representing the Russian Olympic committee, won the silver medal, the first time a Russian team medaled in the event. Zakharov, formerly a short track speed skater and the 2014 Olympic champion in the team relay, became the second man, after Eric Flaim, to medal at the Olympics in both speed skating and short track speed skating. Ethan Cepuran, Casey Dawson, Emery Lehman and Joey Mantia of the United States won bronze.

Norway were the defending champion and the Olympic record holder at the beginning of the Olympics. South Korea and the Netherlands are the 2018 silver and bronze medalist, respectively. The Netherlands are the 2021 World Single Distances champion in team pursuit, with Canada second and the Russian Skating Union third. The United States were leading the 2021–22 ISU Speed Skating World Cup after three events before the Olympics, ahead of Norway and Canada. At one of the world cup events, two months before the start of the Olympics, the US team set a new world record. The four previous editions of this event at the Olympics were won by four different teams.

== Qualification ==
A total of 8 team quotas were available for the event, with a maximum of one team per NOC. The top six countries qualified through their performance at the 2021–22 ISU Speed Skating World Cup, while the last two countries qualified through their time performance.

== Emergence of a new technique ==
In January 2020 the US team debuted a new team pursuit technique. While historically skaters share the work by rotating the front athlete to the back, they transferred energy from one athlete to the other by pushing and not rotating. The technique has since become known as the American Push.

In February 2021 the Canadian team won a World Cup using this new technique. In an ISU press release the second place Dutch team conceded that the strategy was superior to their approach.

In the last World Cup before the Olympic Games the US team set a world record on home ice using the new technique.

All three medal winning teams at the 2022 Beijing Olympics used the American Push technique.

The significance of the American Push has been compared to the Fosbury Flop and the Clap Skate.

== Records ==
Prior to this competition, the existing world, Olympic and track records were as follows.

World record	USA; Joey Mantia; Emery Lehman; Casey Dawson	3:34.47	Salt Lake City, Utah, United States	5 December 2021
Olympic record	Norway; Håvard Bøkko; Simen Spieler Nilsen; Sverre Lunde Pedersen	3:37.08	Gangneung, South Korea	21 February 2018
Track record	Netherlands; Jur Veenje; Kayo Vos; Gert Wierda	4:08.52		9 October 2021

A new Olympic record was set during the competition.

Date	Round	Athlete	Country	Time	Record
15 February	SFB	Daniil Aldoshkin; Sergey Trofimov; Ruslan Zakharov	ROC	3:36.62	OR, TR

== Results ==
=== Quarterfinals ===
The quarterfinals were held on 13 February at 21:00.

Rank	Heat	SP	Country	Time	Time behind	Notes
1	3	F	Norway; Hallgeir Engebråten; Peder Kongshaug; Sverre Lunde Pedersen	3:37.47		Semifinal 1
2	3	C	United States; Ethan Cepuran; Casey Dawson; Emery Lehman	3:37.51	+0.04	Semifinal 2
3	4	F	ROC; Daniil Aldoshkin; Sergey Trofimov; Ruslan Zakharov	3:38.67	+1.20	Semifinal 2
4	2	C	Netherlands; Marcel Bosker; Sven Kramer; Patrick Roest	3:38.90	+1.43	Semifinal 1
5	2	F	Canada; Jordan Belchos; Ted-Jan Bloemen; Connor Howe	3:40.18	+2.70	Final C
6	1	C	South Korea; Chung Jae-won; Kim Min-seok; Lee Seung-hoon	3:41.89	+4.42	Final C
7	1	F	Italy; Davide Ghiotto; Andrea Giovannini; Michele Malfatti	3:42.04	+4.57	Final D
8	4	C	China; Lian Ziwen; Wang Haotian; Xu Fu	3:52.25	+14.78	Final D

=== Semifinals ===
The semifinals were held on 15 February at 14:52.

Rank	SP	Country	Time	Deficit	Notes
Semifinal 1
1	F	Norway; Hallgeir Engebråten; Peder Kongshaug; Sverre Lunde Pedersen	3:38.28	–	Final A
2	C	Netherlands; Marcel Bosker; Sven Kramer; Patrick Roest	3:39.62	+1.34	Final B
Semifinal 2
1	C	ROC; Daniil Aldoshkin; Sergey Trofimov; Ruslan Zakharov	3:36.62		OR, Final A
2	F	United States; Ethan Cepuran; Casey Dawson; Emery Lehman	3:37.05	+0.43	Final B

=== Finals ===
The finals were held on 15 February at 15:43.

Rank	SP	Country	Time	Deficit	Notes
Final A
1st place, gold medalist(s)	F	Norway; Hallgeir Engebråten; Peder Kongshaug; Sverre Lunde Pedersen	3:38.08	–	
2nd place, silver medalist(s)	C	ROC; Daniil Aldoshkin; Sergey Trofimov; Ruslan Zakharov	3:40.46	+2.38	
Final B
3rd place, bronze medalist(s)	F	United States; Casey Dawson; Emery Lehman; Joey Mantia	3:38.81	–	
4	C	Netherlands; Marcel Bosker; Sven Kramer; Patrick Roest	3:41.62	+2.81	
Final C
5	F	Canada; Jordan Belchos; Ted-Jan Bloemen; Tyson Langelaar	3:40.39	–	
6	C	South Korea; Chung Jae-won; Kim Min-seok; Park Seong-hyeon	3:53.77	+13.38	
Final D
7	F	Italy; Davide Ghiotto; Andrea Giovannini; Michele Malfatti	3:44.20	–	
8	C	China; Lian Ziwen; Wang Haotian; Xu Fu	3:53.58	+9.38	
