= Speed skating at the 2026 Winter Olympics – Men's team pursuit =

Men's team pursuit at the XXV Olympic Winter Games
- Speed skating
- Venue: Milano Speed Skating Stadium, Milan
- Date: 15, 17 February 2026
- Competitors: 28 from 8 nations
- Teams: 8
- Winning time: 3:39.20

Medalists
1st place, gold medalist(s)		Davide Ghiotto; Andrea Giovannini; Michele Malfatti	Italy
2nd place, silver medalist(s)		Ethan Cepuran; Casey Dawson; Emery Lehman	United States
3rd place, bronze medalist(s)		Li Wenhao; Liu Hanbin; Wu Yu; Ning Zhongyan	China

The men's team pursuit competition in speed skating at the 2026 Winter Olympics was held on 15 February (quarterfinals) and 17 February (semifinals and finals), at the Milano Speed Skating Stadium in Milan. Italy, represented by Davide Ghiotto, Andrea Giovannini, and Michele Malfatti, won the event. The United States were second and China third.

== Background ==
Norway were the defending champions. The Russian Olympic Committee were the 2022 silver medalists, but in 2026 they were barred from participation after the Russian invasion of Ukraine. The United States were the bronze medalists. Before the Olympics, the United States were leading the men's team pursuit standings of the 2025–26 ISU Speed Skating World Cup, followed by the Netherlands and France. The United States were also the 2025 world champions.

== Records ==
Prior to this competition, the existing world, Olympic, and track records were as follows.

World record	United States; Casey Dawson; Emery Lehman; Ethan Cepuran	3:32.49	Salt Lake City, United States	16 November 2025
Olympic record	ROC; Daniil Aldoshkin; Sergey Trofimov; Ruslan Zakharov	3:36.63	Beijing, China	15 February 2022
Track record	Japan; Taiga Sasaki; Taiki Shingai; Yuuta Fuchigami	3:48.29		29 November 2025

== Results ==
=== Quarterfinals ===
The quarterfinals were held on 15 February at 16:00.

Rank	Heat	SP	Country	Time	Time behind	Notes
1	2	F	Italy; Davide Ghiotto; Andrea Giovannini; Michele Malfatti	3:38.40	–	SF1
2	2	C	United States; Ethan Cepuran; Casey Dawson; Emery Lehman	3:39.37	+0.97	SF2
3	3	F	China; Li Wenhao; Liu Hanbin; Wu Yu	3:41.66	+3.26	SF2
4	4	C	Netherlands; Marcel Bosker; Chris Huizinga; Stijn van de Bunt	3:41.85	+3.45	SF1
5	4	F	France; Germain Deschamps; Timothy Loubineaud; Valentin Thiebault	3:42.70	+4.30	FC
6	3	C	Norway; Sigurd Holbø Dyrset; Peder Kongshaug; Didrik Eng Strand	3:44.36	+5.96	FC
7	1	F	Germany; Patrick Beckert; Felix Maly; Fridtjof Petzold	3:45.28	+6.88	FD
8	1	C	Japan; Motonaga Arito; Shomu Sasaki; Kazuya Yamada	3:48.14	+9.74	FD

=== Semifinals ===
The semifinals were held on 17 February at 14:30.

Rank	SP	Country	Time	Deficit	Notes
Semifinal 1
1	F	Italy; Davide Ghiotto; Andrea Giovannini; Michele Malfatti	3:38.88	–	FA
2	C	Netherlands; Jorrit Bergsma; Chris Huizinga; Stijn van de Bunt	3:40.67	+1.79	FB
Semifinal 2
1	F	United States; Ethan Cepuran; Casey Dawson; Emery Lehman	3:44.29	–	FA
2	C	China; Liu Hanbin; Ning Zhongyan; Wu Yu	3:52.22	+7.93	FB

=== Finals ===
The finals were held on 17 February at 15:24.

Rank	SP	Country	Time	Deficit	Notes
Final A
1st place, gold medalist(s)	F	Italy; Davide Ghiotto; Andrea Giovannini; Michele Malfatti	3:39.20	–	
2nd place, silver medalist(s)	C	United States; Ethan Cepuran; Casey Dawson; Emery Lehman	3:43.71	+4.51	
Final B
3rd place, bronze medalist(s)	F	China; Li Wenhao; Liu Hanbin; Wu Yu	3:41.38	–	
4	C	Netherlands; Jorrit Bergsma; Chris Huizinga; Stijn van de Bunt	3:41.47	+0.09	
Final C
5	F	France; Timothy Loubineaud; Valentin Thiebault; Giovanni Trebouta	3:43.90	–	
6	C	Norway; Sigurd Holbø Dyrset; Sigurd Henriksen; Didrik Eng Strand	3:48.92	+5.02	
Final D
7	F	Germany; Patrick Beckert; Felix Maly; Fridtjof Petzold	3:45.25	–	
8	C	Japan; Motonaga Arito; Shomu Sasaki; Kazuya Yamada	3:47.39	+ 2.14	
