= 2024 European Speed Skating Championships – Men's mass start =

Men's mass start at the 2024 European Speed Skating Championships
- Venue: Thialf
- Location: Heerenveen, Netherlands
- Dates: 7 January
- Competitors: 19 from 11 nations
- Winning points: 60

Medalists
gold medal	Bart Swings	Belgium
silver medal	Gabriel Odor	Austria
bronze medal	Allan Dahl Johansson	Norway

The men's mass start competition at the 2024 European Speed Skating Championships was held on 7 January 2024.

== Results ==
The race was started at 17:29.

Rank	Name	Country	Laps	Points	Time
1st place, gold medalist(s)	Bart Swings	Belgium	16	60	8:13.71
2nd place, silver medalist(s)	Gabriel Odor	Austria	16	40	8:13.93
3rd place, bronze medalist(s)	Allan Dahl Johansson	Norway	16	20	8:13.99
4	Daniele Di Stefano	Italy	16	10	8:14.00
5	Livio Wenger	Switzerland	16	6	8:14.04
6	Artur Janicki	Poland	16	5	8:35.36
7	Andrea Giovannini	Italy	16	3	8:14.26
8	Fridtjof Petzold	Germany	16	3	8:17.77
9	Dawid Burzykowski	Poland	16	3	8:21.92
10	Marcel Bosker	Netherlands	16	2	8:16.63
11	Bálint Bödei	Hungary	16	2	8:44.84
12	Indra Médard	Belgium	16	1	8:15.87
13	Gabriel Groß	Germany	16	1	8:21.55
14	Botond Bejczi	Hungary	16	1	8:36.79
15	Manuel Taibo	Spain	16	0	8:20.19
16	Thibault Métraux	Switzerland	16	0	8:35.19
17	Timothy Loubineaud	France	11	0	DNF
18	Mathieu Belloir	France	11	0	DNF
19	Bart Hoolwerf	Netherlands	Disqualified		
—	Kristian Gamme Ulekleiv	Norway	Did not start		
