= Li Wenhao =

Li Wenhao may refer to:

- Li Wenhao (cyclist) (born 1983), Chinese cyclist
- Li Wenhao (speed skater) (born 2004), Chinese speed skater
