= 2026 European Speed Skating Championships – Men's mass start =

Men's mass start at the 2026 European Speed Skating Championships
- Venue: Ice Arena
- Location: Tomaszów Mazowiecki, Poland
- Dates: 11 January
- Competitors: 20 from 11 nations
- Winning points: 60

Medalists
| gold medal | Bart Swings | Belgium |
| silver medal | Bart Hoolwerf | Netherlands |
| bronze medal | Andrea Giovannini | Italy |

The men's mass start competition at the 2026 European Speed Skating Championships was held on 11 January 2026. Bart Swings from Belgium won his fourth consecutive European title on the mass start.

== Results ==
The race was started at 16:51.

| Rank | Name | Country | Laps | Points | Time |
|---|---|---|---|---|---|
| 1st place, gold medalist(s) | Bart Swings | Belgium | 16 | 60 | 7:44.63 |
| 2nd place, silver medalist(s) | Bart Hoolwerf | Netherlands | 16 | 41 | 7:44.79 |
| 3rd place, bronze medalist(s) | Andrea Giovannini | Italy | 16 | 22 | 7:45.00 |
| 4 | Valentin Thiebault | France | 16 | 10 | 7:45.42 |
| 5 | Gabriel Odor | Austria | 16 | 6 | 7:45.49 |
| 6 | Luca Matteo Stibenz | Germany | 16 | 4 | 7:58.33 |
| 7 | Mathieu Belloir | France | 16 | 3 | 7:45.75 |
| 8 | Riccardo Lorello | Italy | 16 | 3 | 7:50.57 |
| 9 | Tom Rudolph | Germany | 16 | 3 | 8:04.03 |
| 10 | Botond Bejczi | Hungary | 16 | 3 | 8:08.55 |
| 11 | Louis Hollaar | Netherlands | 16 | 2 | 8:02.66 |
| 12 | Indra Médard | Belgium | 16 | 0 | 7:46.91 |
| 13 | Mateusz Śliwka | Poland | 16 | 0 | 7:47.61 |
| 14 | Marcin Bachanek | Poland | 16 | 0 | 7:47.64 |
| 15 | Didrik Eng Strand | Norway | 16 | 0 | 7:48.99 |
| 16 | Sigurd Holbø Dyrset | Norway | 16 | 0 | 7:49.19 |
| 17 | Alexander Farthofer | Austria | 16 | 0 | 7:51.41 |
| 18 | Tadeáš Procházka | Czech Republic | 16 | 0 | 7:59.39 |
| 19 | Lukáš Steklý | Slovakia | 16 | 0 | 8:02.11 |
| 20 | Konrád Nagy | Hungary | 16 | 0 | 8:04.22 |
