= Inline speed skating at the World Games =

Roller speed skating has been an included sport at the World Games since its introduction in 1981. From 1997 and onwards inline skates have been used.

== Medalists ==
=== Track skating ===
==== Men ====
===== 300 metres time trial =====
Games	Gold	Silver	Bronze
1985 London	Patrizio Sarto (ITA)	Scott Constantine (NZL)	Donald Van Patten (USA)
1989 Karlsruhe	Luca Antoniel (ITA)	Oscar Galliazo (ITA)	Doug Glass (USA)
1993 The Hague	Anthony Muse (USA)	Luca Antoniel (ITA)	Derek Parra (USA)
1997 Lahti	Keith Turner (USA)	Carlos Penagos (COL)	Chad Hedrick (USA)
2001 Akita	Gregory Duggento (ITA)	Kalon Dobbin (NZL)	Chad Hedrick (USA)
2005 Duisburg	Gregory Duggento (ITA)	Kalon Dobbin (NZL)	Javier Mc Cargo (USA)
2009 Kaohsiung	Lo Wei-Lin (TPE)	Andrés Muñoz (COL)	Pedro Causil (COL)
2013 Cali	Pedro Causil (COL)	Andrés Muñoz (COL)	Jang Su-Chul (KOR)
2017 Wroclaw	Simon Albrecht (GER)	Andrés Jiménez (COL)	Gwendal Le Pivert (FRA)

===== 500 metres sprint =====
Games	Gold	Silver	Bronze
1993 The Hague	Anthony Muse (USA)	Luca Antoniel (ITA)	Derek Parra (USA)
1997 Lahti	Keith Turner (USA)	Chad Hedrick (USA)	Arnaud Cicquel (FRA)
2001 Akita	Chad Hedrick (USA)	Miguel Rueda (COL)	Gregory Duggento (ITA)
2005 Duisburg	Kalon Dobbin (NZL)	Anderson Ariza (COL)	Camilo Orozco (COL)
2009 Kaohsiung	Andrés Muñoz (COL)	Lo Wei-Lin (TPE)	Lee Myung-Kyu (KOR)
2013 Cali	Andrea Angeletti (ITA)	Lo Wei-Lin (TPE)	Jang Su-Chul (KOR)
2017 Wroclaw	Simon Albrecht (GER)	Johan Guzmán (VEN)	Lucas Silva (CHI)

===== 1,000 metres sprint =====
Games	Gold	Silver	Bronze
2005 Duisburg	Kalon Dobbin (NZL)	Baptiste Grandgirard (FRA)	José Guzmán (COL)
2009 Kaohsiung	Pedro Causil (COL)	Alexis Contin (FRA)	Claudio Naselli (ITA)
2013 Cali	Andrés Muñoz (COL)	Bart Swings (BEL)	Pedro Causil (COL)
2017 Wroclaw	Andrés Jiménez (COL)	Bart Swings (BEL)	Elton De Souza (FRA)

===== 1,500 metres sprint =====
Games	Gold	Silver	Bronze
1985 London	Giuseppe De Persio (ITA)	Massimo Mussi (ITA)	Kevin Webb (AUS)
1989 Karlsruhe	Dante Muse (USA)	Giuseppe De Persio (ITA)	Anthony Hanley (AUS)

===== 3,000 metres in line =====
Games	Gold	Silver	Bronze
2005 Duisburg	Thomas Boucher (FRA)	Alexis Contin (FRA)	Fabio Francolini (ITA)

===== 5,000 metres =====
Games	Gold	Silver	Bronze
1981 Santa Clara	Tom Peterson (USA)	Giuseppe Cruciani (ITA)	Ermes Fossi (ITA)
1985 London	Donald Van Patten (USA)	Robert Kaiser (USA)	Anthony Keefe (AUS)
1989 Karlsruhe	Anthony Muse (USA)	Dante Muse (USA)	Anthony Keefe (AUS)
1993 The Hague	Arnaud Cicquel (FRA)	Derek Parra (USA)	Christophe Luxton (AUS)
1997 Lahti	Chad Hedrick (USA)	Christophe Luxton (AUS)	Scott Hiatt (USA)

===== 5,000 metres point =====
Games	Gold	Silver	Bronze
2005 Duisburg	Alexis Contin (FRA)	Shane Dobbin (NZL)	Matteo Amabili (ITA)

===== 10,000 metres =====
Games	Gold	Silver	Bronze
1981 Santa Clara	Tom Peterson (USA)	Hermes Fossi (ITA)	Moreno Bagnolini (ITA)
1985 London	Robert Kaiser (USA)	Massimo Muzzi (ITA)	Danny Vandeperre (BEL)
1989 Karlsruhe	Dante Muse (USA)	Anthony Hanley (AUS)	Giuseppe De Persio (ITA)

===== 10,000 metres elimination =====
Games	Gold	Silver	Bronze
1985 London	Robert Kaiser (USA)	Donald Van Patten (USA)	Hernando Montano (COL)
2005 Duisburg	Baptiste Grandgirard (FRA)	Kalon Dobbin (NZL)	Fabio Francolini (ITA)

===== 10,000 metres point =====
Games	Gold	Silver	Bronze
1993 The Hague	Derek Parra (USA)	Arnaud Cicquel (FRA)	Christophe Luxton (AUS)
1997 Lahti	Jorge Botero (COL)	Arnaud Cicquel (FRA)	Christophe Luxton (AUS)
2001 Akita	Chad Hedrick (USA)	Shane Dobbin (NZL)	Jorge Botero (COL)

===== 10,000 metres point elimination =====
Games	Gold	Silver	Bronze
2009 Kaohsiung	Yann Guyader (FRA)	Nelson Garzõn (COL)	Daniel Álvarez (VEN)
2017 Wroclaw	Ken Kuwada (ARG)	Livio Wenger (SUI)	Alejandro Paez (MEX)

===== 15,000 metres elimination =====
Games	Gold	Silver	Bronze
2009 Kaohsiung	Jorge Luis Cifuentes (COL)	Yann Guyader (FRA)	Andrés Muñoz (COL)
2013 Cali	Peter Michael (NZL)	Jorge Luis Cifuentes (COL)	Chen Yan-Cheng (TPE)
2017 Wroclaw	Elton De Souza (FRA)	Felix Rijhnen (GER)	Peter Michael (NZL)

===== 15,000 metres point elimination =====
Games	Gold	Silver	Bronze
2001 Akita	Chad Hedrick (USA)	Diego Rosero (COL)	Jorge Botero (COL)

===== 20,000 metres =====
Games	Gold	Silver	Bronze
1981 Santa Clara	Scott Constantine (NZL)	Giuseppe Cruciani (ITA)	Moreno Bagnolini (ITA)
1985 London	Donald Van Patten (USA)	Jean Van Hoornweder (BEL)	Danny Vandeperre (BEL)

===== 20,000 metres elimination =====
Games	Gold	Silver	Bronze
1989 Karlsruhe	Dante Muse (USA)	Olivier Babonneau (FRA)	Pascal Gravouil (FRA)
1993 The Hague	Armando Capannolo (ITA)	Arnaud Cicquel (FRA)	John Dyett-Carthew (NZL)
1997 Lahti	Chad Hedrick (USA)	Arnaud Cicquel (FRA)	Juan Betancour (COL)
2001 Akita	Kalon Dobbin (NZL)	Jorge Botero (COL)	Christoph Zschätzsch (GER)

==== Women ====
===== 300 metres time trial =====
Games	Gold	Silver	Bronze
1985 London	Stefania Ghermandi (ITA)	Darlene Kessinger (USA)	Beth Tucker (USA)
1989 Karlsruhe	Barbara Fischer (FRG)	Anne Titze (FRG)	Nadia Meerkens (BEL)
1993 The Hague	Desly Hill (AUS)	Anne Titze (GER)	Heather Laufer (USA)
1997 Lahti	Julie Brandt (USA)	Cheryl Ezzell (USA)	Teresa Cliff (USA)
2001 Akita	Pan Li-ling (TPE)	Valentina Belloni (ITA)	Pan Yi-chin (TPE)
2005 Duisburg	Laura Orru (ITA)	Andrea Gonzalez (ARG)	Jennifer Caicedo (COL)
2009 Kaohsiung	Huang Yu-ting (TPE)	Han Chiao-jen (TPE)	Lim Jin-seon (KOR)
2013 Cali	Erika Zanetti (ITA)	Paola Segura (COL)	An Yi-seul (KOR)
2017 Wroclaw	Geiny Pájaro (COL)	An Yi-seul (KOR)	Sandrine Tas (BEL)

===== 500 metres sprint =====
Games	Gold	Silver	Bronze
1993 The Hague	Hilde Goovaerts (BEL)	Luana Pilia (ITA)	María Eva Richardson (ARG)
1997 Lahti	Cheryl Ezzell (USA)	Teresa Cliff (USA)	Julie Brandt (USA)
2001 Akita	Pan Li-ling (TPE)	Pan Yi-chin (TPE)	Berenice Moreno (COL)
2005 Duisburg	Jennifer Caicedo (COL)	Laura Orru (ITA)	Cecilia Baena (COL)
2009 Kaohsiung	Huang Yu-ting (TPE)	Lim Jin-seon (KOR)	Yersi Puello (COL)
2013 Cali	Yersi Puello (COL)	Paola Segura (COL)	Huang Yu-ting (TPE)
2017 Wroclaw	Giulia Bonechi (ITA)	Fabriana Arias (COL)	Giulia Bongiorno (ITA)

===== 1,000 metres sprint =====
Games	Gold	Silver	Bronze
2005 Duisburg	Andrea Gonzalez (ARG)	Jennifer Caicedo (COL)	Jana Gegner (GER)
2009 Kaohsiung	Huang Yu-ting (TPE)	Han Chiao-jen (TPE)	Nicole Begg (NZL)
2013 Cali	Huang Yu-ting (TPE)	Mareike Thum (GER)	Li Meng-chu (TPE)
2017 Wroclaw	Sandrine Tas (BEL)	Fabriana Arias (COL)	Alejandra Traslaviña (CHI)

===== 1,500 metres sprint =====
Games	Gold	Silver	Bronze
1985 London	Laura Perinti (ITA)	Monica Lucchese (ITA)	Annie Lambrechts (BEL)
1989 Karlsruhe	Francesca Monteverde (ITA)	Antonella Mauri (ITA)	Luana Pilia (ITA)

===== 3,000 metres =====
Games	Gold	Silver	Bronze
1985 London	Stefania Ghermandi (ITA)	Laura Perinti (ITA)	Ann Bloomfield (AUS)
1989 Karlsruhe	Luana Pilia (ITA)	Antonella Mauri (ITA)	Francesca Monteverde (ITA)
1993 The Hague	Anne Titze (GER)	Desly Hill (AUS)	Caroline Lagree (FRA)
1997 Lahti	Teresa Cliff (USA)	Julie Brandt (USA)	Cheryl Ezzell (USA)
2005 Duisburg	Cecilia Baena (COL)	Jennifer Caicedo (COL)	Pan Yi-chin (TPE)

===== 5,000 metres =====
Games	Gold	Silver	Bronze
1981 Santa Clara	Monica Lucchese (ITA)	Paola Sometti (ITA)	Annie Lambrechts (BEL)
1985 London	Marisa Canafoglia (ITA)	Stefania Ghermandi (ITA)	Ann van Hoornweder (BEL)
1989 Karlsruhe	Antonella Mauri (ITA)	Francesca Monteverde (ITA)	Luana Pilia (ITA)

===== 5,000 metres elimination =====
Games	Gold	Silver	Bronze
1985 London	Laura Perinti (ITA)	Marisa Canafoglia (ITA)	Monica Lucchese (ITA)

===== 5,000 metres point =====
Games	Gold	Silver	Bronze
1993 The Hague	Caroline Lagree (FRA)	Araceli Larrea (ESP)	Heather Laufer (USA)
1997 Lahti	Julie Brandt (USA)	Cheryl Ezzell (USA)	Teresa Cliff (USA)
2001 Akita	Silvia Niño (COL)	Alexandra Vivas (COL)	Berenice Moreno (COL)
2005 Duisburg	Kim Hye-mi (KOR)	Woo Hyo-sook (KOR)	Silvia Niño (COL)

===== 10,000 metres =====
Games	Gold	Silver	Bronze
1981 Santa Clara	Paola Cristofori (ITA)	Darlene Kessenger (USA)	Annie Lambrechts (BEL)
1985 London	Monica Lucchese (ITA)	Marisa Canafoglia (ITA)	Stefania Ghermandi (ITA)

===== 10,000 metres elimination =====
Games	Gold	Silver	Bronze
1989 Karlsruhe	Antonella Mauri (ITA)	Francesca Monteverde (ITA)	Luana Pilia (ITA)
1993 The Hague	Anne Titze (GER)	Antonella Mauri (ITA)	Hilde Goovaerts (BEL)
1997 Lahti	Teresa Cliff (USA)	Cheryl Ezzell (USA)	Julie Brandt (USA)
2005 Duisburg	Silvia Niño (COL)	Cecilia Baena (COL)	Kim Hye-mi (TPE)

===== 10,000 metres point elimination =====
Games	Gold	Silver	Bronze
2001 Akita	Alexandra Vivas (COL)	Pan Yi-chin (TPE)	Silvia Niño (COL)
2009 Kaohsiung	Woo Hyo-sook (KOR)	Martha Lucia Ramírez (COL)	Nicole Begg (NZL)
2017 Wroclaw	Fabriana Arias (COL)	Sandrine Tas (BEL)	Yang Ho-chen (TPE)

===== 15,000 metres =====
Games	Gold	Silver	Bronze
1981 Santa Clara	Annie Lambrechte (BEL)	Paolo Christofori (ITA)	Monica Lucchese (ITA)

===== 15,000 metres elimination =====
Games	Gold	Silver	Bronze
2001 Akita	Berenice Moreno (COL)	Silvia Niño (COL)	Pan Yi-chin (TPE)
2009 Kaohsiung	Woo Hyo-sook (KOR)	Martha Lucia Ramírez (COL)	Pan Yi-chin (TPE)
2013 Cali	Annette Heywood (USA)	Guo Dan (CHN)	Rommy Muñoz (COL)
2017 Wroclaw	Fabriana Arias (COL)	Sandrine Tas (BEL)	Mareike Thum (GER)

=== Road skating ===
==== Men ====
===== Marathon =====
Games	Gold	Silver	Bronze
1981 Santa Clara	Tom Peterson (USA)	Hermes Fossi (ITA)	Danny Vandeperre (BEL)

===== 200 metres time trial =====
Games	Gold	Silver	Bronze
2013 Cali	Emanuelle Silva (CHI)	Andrés Muñoz (COL)	Jorge Martínez (MEX)
2017 Wroclaw	Ioseba Fernandez (ESP)	Simon Albrecht (GER)	Gwendal Le Pivert (FRA)

===== 500 metres sprint =====
Games	Gold	Silver	Bronze
2013 Cali	Pedro Causil (COL)	Andrés Muñoz (COL)	Andrea Angeletti (ITA)
2017 Wroclaw	Gwendal Le Pivert (FRA)	Edwin Estrada (COL)	Johan Guzmán (VEN)

===== 10,000 metres points race =====
Games	Gold	Silver	Bronze
2013 Cali	Liao Yen-sheng (TPE)	Jorge Luis Cifuentes (COL)	Bart Swings (BEL)
2017 Wroclaw	Bart Swings (BEL)	Daniel Niero (ITA)	Patxi Peula (ESP)

===== 20,000 metres elimination race =====
Games	Gold	Silver	Bronze
2013 Cali	Bart Swings (BEL)	Peter Michael (NZL)	Jorge Bolaños (ECU)
2017 Wroclaw	Bart Swings (BEL)	Daniel Niero (ITA)	Patxi Peula (ESP)

==== Women ====
===== Half-marathon =====
Games	Gold	Silver	Bronze
1981 Santa Clara	Annie Lambrechts (BEL)	Mary Barriere (USA)	Sue Dooley (USA)

===== 200 metres time trial =====
Games	Gold	Silver	Bronze
2013 Cali	María José Moya (CHI)	Jersy Puello (COL)	Erika Zanetti (ITA)
2017 Wroclaw	María José Moya (CHI)	Chen Ying-chu (TPE)	An Yi-seul (KOR)

===== 500 metres sprint =====
Games	Gold	Silver	Bronze
2013 Cali	Erika Zanetti (ITA)	Pamela Verdugo (CHI)	Jana Gegner (GER)
2017 Wroclaw	Mareike Thum (GER)	Chen Ying-chu (TPE)	Rocío Berbel Alt (ARG)

===== 10,000 metres points race =====
Games	Gold	Silver	Bronze
2013 Cali	Yang Ho-chen (TPE)	Rommy Muñoz (COL)	Huang Yu-ting (TPE)
2017 Wroclaw	Fabriana Arias (COL)	Sandrine Tas (BEL)	Johana Viveros (COL)

===== 20,000 metres elimination race =====
Games	Gold	Silver	Bronze
2013 Cali	Guo Dan (CHN)	Yang Ho-chen (TPE)	Rommy Muñoz (COL)
2017 Wroclaw	Johana Viveros (COL)	Sandrine Tas (BEL)	Mareike Thum (GER)
