= Pedro Causil =

Colombian inline and ice speed skater

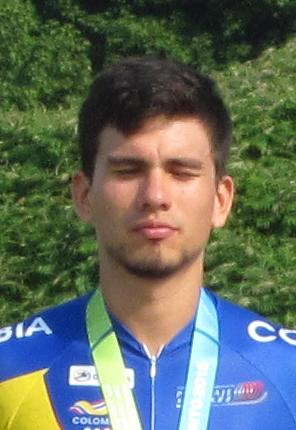
- Causil pictured on the podium after winning a silver medal in the Men's 200 metres time-trial roller speed skating event at the 2015 Pan American Games in Toronto, Canada

Personal information
- Born: 14 April 1991 (age 35)
- Height: 181 cm (5 ft 11 in)
- Weight: 75 kg (165 lb)

Sport
- Country: Colombia
- Sport: Speed skating

Achievements and titles
- Olympic finals: 2018 Winter
- Personal bests: 500m=34.92 1000m=1.08.83 1500m=1.49.66 3000m=4.08.94
Medal record
Representing Colombia
Event	1st	2nd	3rd
World Championships	2	2	0
World Games	3	0	2
Pan American Games	5	1	0
Total	10	3	2
Men's road inline speed skating
World Games
Gold medal – first place	2013 Cali	500 m sprint
Men's track inline speed skating
World Championships
Gold medal – first place	2021 Ibagué	1000 m sprint
Gold medal – first place	2021 Ibagué	3000 m relay
Silver medal – second place	2021 Ibagué	200 m time trial
Silver medal – second place	2021 Ibagué	500 m sprint
World Games
Gold medal – first place	2009 Kaohsiung	1000 m sprint
Gold medal – first place	2013 Cali	300 m time trial
Bronze medal – third place	2009 Kaohsiung	300 m time trial
Bronze medal – third place	2013 Cali	1000 m sprint
Pan American Games
Gold medal – first place	2011 Guadalajara	300 m time trial
Gold medal – first place	2011 Guadalajara	1000 m sprint
Gold medal – first place	2015 Toronto	500 m sprint
Gold medal – first place	2019 Lima	300 m time trial
Gold medal – first place	2019 Lima	500 m sprint
Silver medal – second place	2015 Toronto	200 m time-trial

Pedro Causil (Spanish pronunciation: [ˈpeðɾo kawˈsil]; born 14 April 1991, in Cartagena, Colombia) is an inline speed skater and (ice) speed skater.

== Career ==
=== Inline skating ===
Causil is a multiple time world champion in inline speed skating. Causil also won multiple Pan American Games medals as an inline skater. At the 2011 Pan American Games in Guadalajara, Mexico, Causil won two gold medals. Four years later at the 2015 Pan American Games in Toronto, Canada, Causil won a gold and one silver. Causil also won several medals at The World Games. Both at The World Games 2009 in Kaohsiung, Chinese Taipei, and at The World Games 2013 in Cali, Colombia, Causil won two gold and one bronze medal.

=== Speed skating ===
Causil switched to compete in speed skating as inline skating was not on the Olympic program. Causil became the first speed skater from South America to qualify for the Winter Olympics. He skated in the 500 and 1000 metres events at the 2018 Winter Olympics in Pyeongchang, South Korea.

== See also ==
- Colombia at the 2018 Winter Olympics
- Speed skating at the 2018 Winter Olympics

Olympic Games
Preceded by Yuri Alvear	Flagbearer for Colombia; PyeongChang 2018	Succeeded by Caterine Ibargüen; Yuberjen Martínez
