= 2025 World Single Distances Speed Skating Championships – Men's team pursuit =

Men's team pursuit at the 2025 World Single Distances Speed Skating Championships
- Venue: Vikingskipet
- Location: Hamar, Norway
- Dates: 14 March
- Competitors: 24 from 8 nations
- Teams: 8
- Winning time: 3:39.24

Medalists
gold medal	Casey Dawson; Emery Lehman; Ethan Cepuran	United States
silver medal	Davide Ghiotto; Michele Malfatti; Andrea Giovannini	Italy
bronze medal	Chris Huizinga; Beau Snellink; Marcel Bosker	Netherlands

The Men's team pursuit competition at the 2025 World Single Distances Speed Skating Championships took place on 14 March 2025.

== Qualification ==
A total of eight entry quotas were available for the event, with a maximum of one per country. The entry quotas were assigned to countries following a Special Qualification Ranking List based on World Cup points and times during the 2024–25 ISU Speed Skating World Cup.

== Records ==
Prior to this competition, the existing world and track records were as follows.

	Time	Team	Date
World Record	3:33.66	United States	27 January 2024
Track Record	3:43.58	United States	27 November 2010

== Results ==
The race was started at 19:30.

Rank	Pair	Lane	Country	Time	Diff
1st place, gold medalist(s)	3	s	United States; Casey Dawson; Emery Lehman; Ethan Cepuran	3:39.24; TR	
2nd place, silver medalist(s)	3	c	Italy; Davide Ghiotto; Michele Malfatti; Andrea Giovannini	3:41.17	+1.93
3rd place, bronze medalist(s)	4	s	Netherlands; Chris Huizinga; Beau Snellink; Marcel Bosker	3:41.91	+2.67
4	2	c	Japan; Motonaga Arito; Shomu Sasaki; Riku Tsuchiya	3:44.79	+5.55
5	1	c	Belgium; Jason Suttels; Indra Médard; Bart Swings	3:45.09	+5.85
6	2	s	China; Liu Hanbin; Wu Yu; Pan Baoshuo	3:45.10	+5.86
7	1	s	France; Timothy Loubineaud; Valentin Thiebault; Germain Deschamps	3:45.16	+5.92
	4	c	Norway; Sander Eitrem; Sigurd Henriksen; Peder Kongshaug	Did not finish	
