= 2018 European Speed Skating Championships – Men's mass start =

Men's mass start at the 2018 European Speed Skating Championships
- Venue: Kolomna Speed Skating Center
- Location: Kolomna, Russia
- Dates: 7 January
- Competitors: 15 from 10 nations
- Winning points: 60

Medalists
gold medal	Jan Blokhuijsen	Netherlands
silver medal	Andrea Giovannini	Italy
bronze medal	Ruslan Zakharov	Russia

The men's mass start competition at the 2018 European Speed Skating Championships was held on 7 January 2018.

== Results ==
The race was started at 18:06.

Rank	Name	Country	Time	Points
1st place, gold medalist(s)	Jan Blokhuijsen	Netherlands	8:23.19	60
2nd place, silver medalist(s)	Andrea Giovannini	Italy	8:23.28	41
3rd place, bronze medalist(s)	Ruslan Zakharov	Russia	8:23.37	20
4	Simon Schouten	Netherlands	8:23.77	6
5	Marcin Bachanek	Poland	8:36.18	5
6	Mathias Vosté	Belgium	8:41.93	5
7	Vitaly Mikhailov	Belarus	8:23.81	4
8	Armin Hager	Austria	8:24.23	3
9	Konrad Niedźwiedzki	Poland	8:26.80	3
10	Danila Semerikov	Russia	8:23.47	
11	Haralds Silovs	Latvia	8:23.67	
12	Runar Njåtun Krøyer	Norway	8:23.79	
13	Linus Heidegger	Austria	8:24.32	
14	Riccardo Bugari	Italy	8:55.91	
15	Oliver Grob	Switzerland	DNF	
