= Casey Dawson =

American speed skater (born 2000)

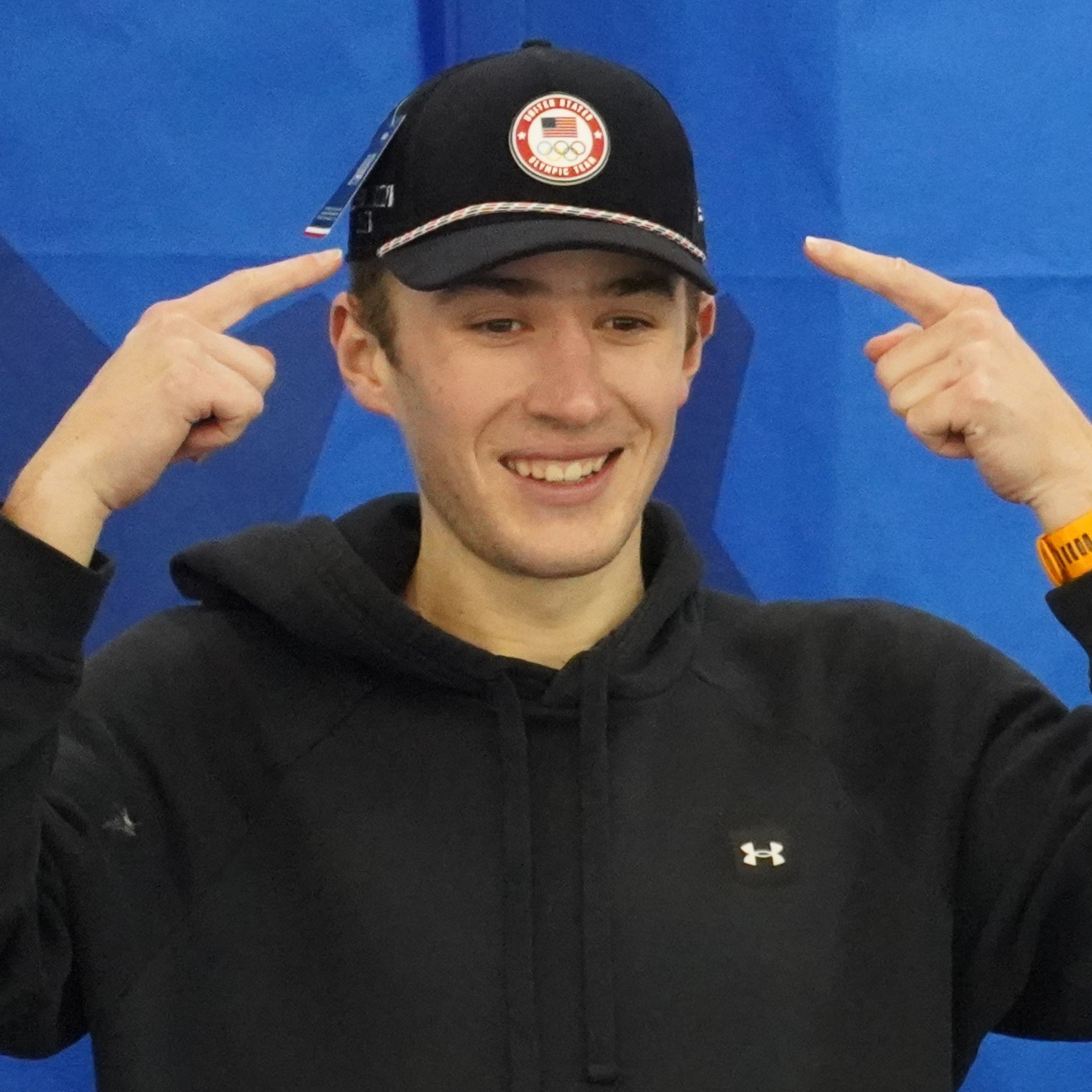
- Dawson in 2026

Personal information
- Born: August 2, 2000 (age 26) Park City, Utah, U.S.
- Height: 6 ft 3 in (191 cm)

Sport
- Country: United States
- Sport: Speed skating
Medal record
Men's speed skating
Representing the United States
Olympic Games
Silver medal – second place	2026 Milano Cortina	Team pursuit
Bronze medal – third place	2022 Beijing	Team pursuit
World Single Distances Championships
Gold medal – first place	2025 Hamar	Team pursuit
Four Continents Championships
Gold medal – first place	2024 Salt Lake City	5000 m
Gold medal – first place	2024 Salt Lake City	Team pursuit
World Junior Championships
Bronze medal – third place	2020 Tomaszów Mazowiecki	5000 m

Casey Dawson (born August 2, 2000) is an American speed skater. He represented the United States at the 2022 and 2026 Winter Olympics, and is a two-time Olympic medalist in the team pursuit event, winning a bronze medal in 2022 and a silver in 2026.

== Career ==
At the junior level, Dawson complete at the 2020 World Junior Speed Skating Championships and won bronze medal in 5000 meter.

During the 2021–22 ISU Speed Skating World Cup, Dawson set the world record in the team pursuit with a time of 3:34.47. Dawson represented the United States at the 2022 Winter Olympics in the team pursuit and won a bronze medal.

He participated at the 2024 Four Continents Speed Skating Championships and won gold medals in the 5000 meter and the team pursuit.

He represented the United States at the 2025 World Single Distances Speed Skating Championships and won a gold medal in the team pursuit, along with Emery Lehman and Ethan Cepuran. This was the United States' first World Single Distances Championship gold medal in the team pursuit since 2011.

He again represented the United States at the 2026 Winter Olympics and won a silver medal in the team pursuit event with a time of 3:43.71.

== World Cup overview ==
Key

Category
Senior level
Junior level

Season	Location	5000 meter*
2021–2022	(Canada) Calgary	11th
2022–2023	(Norway) Stavanger	14th
2022–2023	(Poland) Tomaszów Mazowiecki	13th
2022–2023	(Poland) Tomaszów Mazowiecki	7th
2023–2024	(Japan) Obihiro	10th
2023–2024	(China) Beijing	10th
2023–2024	(Poland) Tomaszów Mazowiecki	16th
2023–2024	(United States) Salt Lake City	9th
2023–2024	(Canada) Quebec	8th
2024–2025	(Japan) Nagano	8th
2024–2025	(China) Beijing	8th
2024–2025	(United States) Milwaukee	4th
2024–2025	(Poland) Tomaszów Mazowiecki	5th
2024–2025	(Netherlands) Heerenveen	6th
2025–2026	(United States) Salt Lake City	4th
2025–2026	(Canada) Calgary	1st place, gold medalist(s)
2025–2026	(Norway) Hamar	8th
2025–2026	(Germany) Inzell	4th
2026–2027	(China) Beijing	8th
2026–2027	(Japan) Obihiro	15th

Season	Location	Team Pursuit*
2017–2018	(United States) Salt Lake City	5th
2019–2020	(Belarus) Minsk	6th
2021–2022	(United States) Salt Lake City	1st place, gold medalist(s)
2021–2022	(Canada) Calgary	1st place, gold medalist(s)
2022–2023	(Norway) Stavanger	1st place, gold medalist(s)
2022–2023	(Canada) Calgary	1st place, gold medalist(s)
2022–2023	(Poland) Tomaszów Mazowiecki	2nd place, silver medalist(s)
2023–2024	(Poland) Tomaszów Mazowiecki	1st place, gold medalist(s)
2023–2024	(United States) Salt Lake City	1st place, gold medalist(s)
2024–2025	(Japan) Nagano	2nd place, silver medalist(s)
2024–2025	(United States) Milwaukee	1st place, gold medalist(s)
2024–2025	(Netherlands) Heerenveen	1st place, gold medalist(s)
2025–2026	(United States) Salt Lake City	1st place, gold medalist(s)
2025–2026	(Canada) Calgary	1st place, gold medalist(s)
2025–2026	(Norway) Hamar	1st place, gold medalist(s)
2026–2027	(China) Beijing	3rd place, bronze medalist(s)
2026–2027	(Japan) Obihiro	7th

Season	Location	1000 meter
2017–2018	(United States) Salt Lake City	18th
2018–2019	(Italy) Baselga di Pinè	31st

Season	Location	1500 meter
2018–2019	(Italy) Baselga di Pinè	14th
2019–2020	(Belarus) Minsk	10th
2021–2022	(Canada) Calgary	12th

Season	Location	3000 meter
2017–2018	(United States) Salt Lake City	15th
2018–2019	(Italy) Baselga di Pinè	11th
2019–2020	(Belarus) Minsk	4th

Season	Location	10000 meter
2023–2024	(Norway) Stavanger	10th
2024–2025	(Canada) Calgary	7th
2025–2026	(Netherlands) Heerenveen	6th
