= Inline speed skating at the 2009 World Games – Men's 300 m time trial =

Inline speed skating – men's 300 m time trial at the 2009 World Games
- Venue: Yangming Skating Rink, Kaohsiung, Taiwan
- Date: 17 July 2009
- Competitors: 17 from 10 nations

Medalists
gold medal	(Chinese Taipei) Lo Wei-lin
silver medal	(Colombia) Andrés Felipe Muñoz
bronze medal	(Colombia) Pedro Causil

The men's 300 m time trial competition in inline speed skating at the 2009 World Games took place on 17 July 2009 at the Yangming Skating Rink in Kaohsiung, Taiwan.

== Competition format ==
A total of 17 athletes entered the competition. Best twelve athletes from preliminary round advances to the final.

== Results ==
=== Preliminary ===
Rank	Athlete	Nation	Time	Note
1	Lo Wei-lin	Chinese Taipei	25.674	Q
2	Andrés Felipe Muñoz	Colombia	25.823	Q
3	Pedro Causil	Colombia	25.995	Q
4	Wouter Hebbrecht	Belgium	26.316	Q
5	Chang Chia-hao	Chinese Taipei	26.367	Q
6	Juan Jardine	Venezuela	26.459	Q
7	Nicolas Pelloquin	France	26.490	Q
8	Kalon Dobbin	New Zealand	26.597	Q
9	Lee Myung-kyu	South Korea	26.634	Q
10	Roman Christen	Switzerland	26.720	Q
11	Fernando Mejia	Spain	26.809	Q
12	Kim Min-ho	South Korea	26.971	Q
13	Kang Kyung-tae	South Korea	27.139	
14	Andrea Zanetti	Italy	27.179	
15	Claudio Naselli	Italy	27.194	
	Marco Rebagliati	Italy	DNS	
	Andrea Andreotti	Italy	DNS	

=== Final ===
Rank	Athlete	Nation	Time
1st place, gold medalist(s)	Lo Wei-lin	Chinese Taipei	25.555
2nd place, silver medalist(s)	Andrés Felipe Muñoz	Colombia	26.093
3rd place, bronze medalist(s)	Pedro Causil	Colombia	26.094
4	Kalon Dobbin	New Zealand	26.213
5	Nicolas Pelloquin	France	26.320
6	Wouter Hebbrecht	Belgium	26.362
7	Chang Chia-hao	Chinese Taipei	26.434
8	Roman Christen	Switzerland	26.631
9	Juan Jardine	Venezuela	26.659
10	Lee Myung-kyu	South Korea	26.752
11	Kim Min-ho	South Korea	26.778
12	Fernando Mejia	Spain	26.824
