= Emery Lehman =

American speed skater (born 1996)

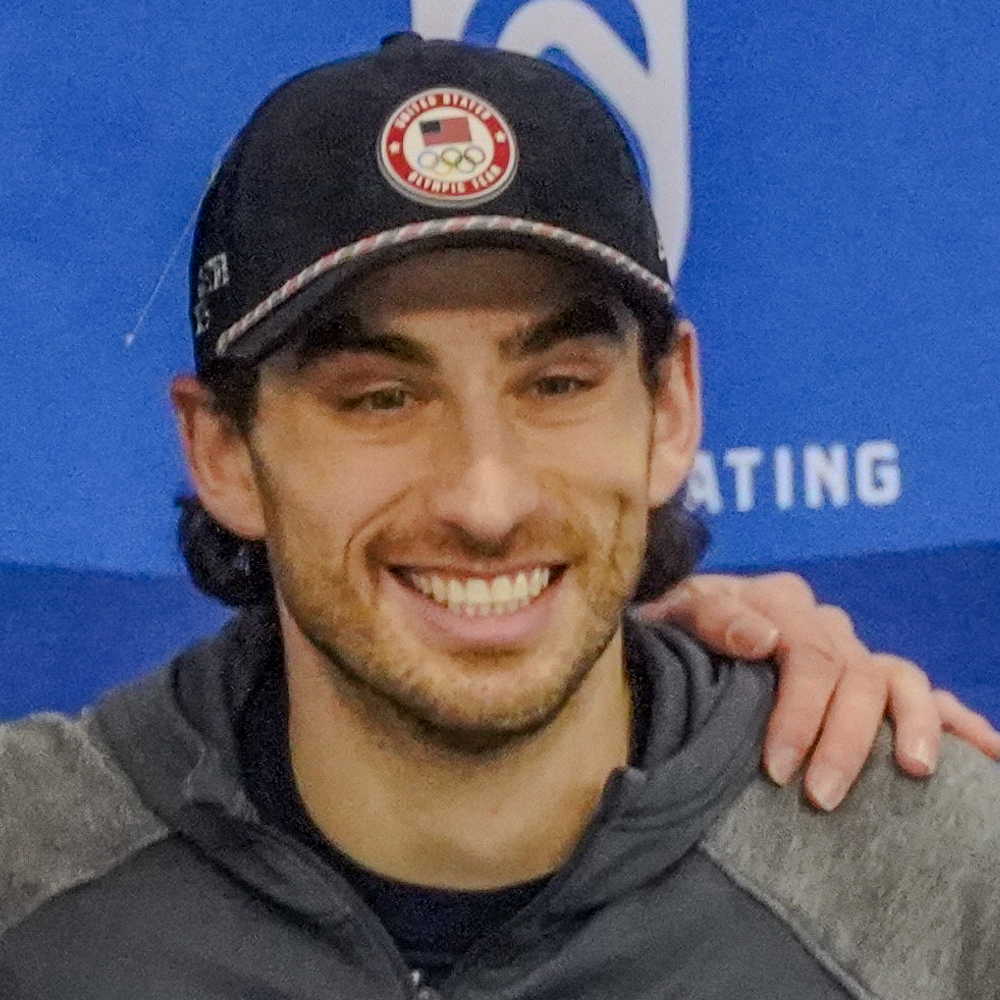
- Lehman in 2026

Personal information
- Full name: Emery Chance Lehman
- Born: June 13, 1996 (age 30) Chicago, Illinois, U.S.
- Education: Marquette University
- Height: 6 ft 0 in (183 cm)
- Weight: 187 lb (85 kg)

Sport
- Country: United States
- Sport: Speed skating
- Club: Franklin Park Speedskating Club
- Coached by: Gabriel Girard
Medal record
Men's speed skating
Representing the United States
Olympic Games
Silver medal – second place	2026 Milano Cortina	Team pursuit
Bronze medal – third place	2022 Beijing	Team pursuit
World Single Distances Championships
Gold medal – first place	2025 Hamar	Team pursuit
Four Continents Championships
Gold medal – first place	2024 Salt Lake City	Team pursuit
Gold medal – first place	2025 Hachinohe	Team pursuit
Silver medal – second place	2024 Salt Lake City	1500 m
Bronze medal – third place	2020 Milwaukee	5000 m
World Junior Championships
Gold medal – first place	2013 Collalbo	5000 m
Bronze medal – third place	2014 Bjugn	5000 m
Bronze medal – third place	2014 Bjugn	Allround
Bronze medal – third place	2015 Warsaw	1500 m
Bronze medal – third place	2015 Warsaw	5000 m

Emery Chance Lehman (born June 13, 1996) is an American speed skater who represented the United States at the 2014, the 2018, 2022, and 2026. He is a two-time Olympic medalist in the team pursuit event, winning a bronze medal in 2022 and a silver medal in 2026.

== Early and personal life ==
Lehman was born in Chicago, Illinois, to parents Marcia and David, and is Jewish. His mother works in non-profit in Chicago, and his father works for Cook County. Lehman started playing ice hockey at age six, taking up speed skating at age nine to improve his hockey. He attended Oak Park and River Forest High School, where he was an honor student. In his senior year of high school, Lehman won the 10000 meters at the 2013–14 US Senior Championship/Olympic Trials and took second place in the 5000 meters.

He lives in Millcreek, Utah as a member of Team USA. During his time off, Lehman enjoys playing table tennis with friends. Lehman lists the Chicago Bears and Chicago Blackhawks as his favorite sports teams, and Bo Jackson as his sporting hero. He says his mother has been the most influential person in his life.

Lehman graduated cum laude from Marquette University, majoring in Civil Engineering, and earned a Master's from Johns Hopkins University with a focus in structural engineering.

== Athletic career ==
=== Ice hockey ===
Lehman began playing ice hockey when he was six years old. As a sophomore in high school, he was selected as a conference All-Star playing defense for Oak Park and River Forest High School's (OPRF) varsity team. Describing Lehman's game, his coach remarked, "He is always first to the puck". During the summer of 2013, Lehman hurt his ankle, and the new OPRF hockey coach did not want to play him for fear of an injury jeopardizing Lehman's Olympic speed skating chances. Lehman thus took his senior year off from hockey. Emery Lehman reignited his career with Marquette’s ACHA Division II Hockey Team. He played defense for the team, scoring 2 goals and 10 assists. Lehman's defensive partner was Colin Redman, captain of the team and brother of NFL tight end Mark Redman.

=== Speed skating ===
At age nine, Lehman saw a poster claiming speed skating could help improve hockey skills.

In 2010, he began training with 2x Olympian Jeff Klaiber (who would coach Lehman at the Olympic Games and through the 2015-16 season). He participated in the 2010–11 World Junior Championships, placing 11th in the 5000 meters and 18th in the All-Around at age 14. In his second year at the World Junior Championships, he was the youngest competitor in the field. At the senior National Championships that year, he placed sixth in the 1500 meter and 5000 meter events. He was fifth in the All-Around.

At the 2012 World Cup trials, Lehman improved his personal best in the 5000 meters by ten seconds, to 6:28.56. Aged 16, he became the youngest skater ever to break 6:30. He finished second overall and qualified for the senior World Cup team. "I know I'm doing well, but I didn't know it would be this well," Lehman remarked.

At the 2012–13 US National Championships, he again improved his 5000-meter time, winning with a time of 6:27.06. He also participated in the 500, 1000, 1500, and 10000 meter events. He turned in personal best times in all four events and placed third in the 10000 meters. At the senior World Championships, he placed 20th in the 5000 meters.

In November 2013, Lehman improved his own Junior National Record and came within 0.8 seconds of the World Junior record with a time of 6:19.87 in the 5000 meters. On December 27, Lehman, skating in the last of 10 pairs of athletes, completed the 5000 meters in a time of 6:25.90 at the US Olympic Trials. The time placed him second and qualified Lehman for his first Olympic Games.

On January 1, 2014, Lehman took part in the 10000 meter race at the Olympic Trials. With three laps to go, he was four seconds behind 2010 Olympian Jonathan Kuck. Lehman took the lead with one lap to go. Kuck re-took the lead at the final turn, but Lehman edged him by seven-hundredths of a second, about two blade lengths, at the finish line. "That was pretty insane," remarked Lehman. "I didn't expect to be finishing anywhere close to Jonathan." Lehman's time of 13:22.77 improved his personal best by seven seconds, and placed him first overall with one pairing – Patrick Meek and Edwin Park – remaining. Meek finished 0.39 seconds behind Lehman, taking third. Gary D'Amato of the Milwaukee Journal Sentinel called the race "perhaps the most thrilling race of the trials".

At the Olympics, Lehman placed 16th in the 5000 meters with a time of 6:29.94. Later, he placed 10th in the 10000 meters with a time of 13:28.67, far exceeding his personal best for a race at sea level. The exertion of the race caused him to vomit. After the games, he went directly to the World Junior Championships.

Lehman trained at the Pettit National Ice Center and was coached by Eric Cepuran from 2016 to 2018. He is a member of the Franklin Park Speedskating Club.

Lehman was named Team Pursuit Specialist for the 2018 Winter Olympics. He placed 21st in the 5,000 meters by finishing in 6 minutes, 31.16 seconds. He and the Team USA team pursuit trio, which also included Brian Hansen and Joey Mantia, finished in eighth place in the D final, with a time of 3:50.77, after skating 3:42.98 in the prior round.

After taking a season off to enroll in school full-time, in the 2019-20 season, Lehman made a coaching change to train under Gabriel Girard, who US Speed Skating has since hired as the long-distance national team head coach. The season started strong, and Lehman saw very positive results in the fall at World Cups and skating marathons in Holland. Later that season, despite dealing with a very serious virus in the weeks leading up, Lehman placed 3rd in the 5000m at the 2020 Four-Continents Championship, held at the Pettit National Ice Center. A month later, at the 2020 ISU World Single Distance Championships, held at the Utah Olympic Oval, Lehman placed 16th in the 1500m, finishing with a personal best time of 1:44.25. Lehman also competed in the team pursuit event alongside teammates Ian Quinn and Ethan Cepuran, finishing in 5th place with a time of 3:38.51.

Since graduating from Marquette University in spring 2020, Lehman has moved to Salt Lake City, Utah, to train on the US speed skating national team program.

Lehman represented the United States at the 2025 World Single Distances Speed Skating Championships and won a gold medal in the team pursuit, along with Casey Dawson and Ethan Cepuran. This was the United States' first World Single Distances Championship gold medal in the team pursuit since 2011. The team pursuit team currently holds the world record for this event, since 2014. They also earned the Bronze Medal at the 2022 Olympics, despite the fact that Casey Dawson arrived in Beijing just two days before the event, due to recovering from COVID.

He again represented the United States at the 2026 Winter Olympics and won a silver medal in the team pursuit event with a time of 3:43.71.

=== Lacrosse ===
Lehman also played lacrosse competitively, serving as a midfielder. During the summers, he played on an elite travel team in Illinois. As a freshman in high school, he was the team captain. Lehman's coach says he is a "very skilled player" who could play for a "high-level Division III to mid-level Division I" college program. He was a member of both Marquette's Club Hockey and Club Lacrosse teams in his off-season to stay in shape.

== Personal bests ==
Personal records
Men's speed skating
Event	Result	Date	Location	Notes
500 m	36.21	October 12, 2024	Utah Olympic Oval, Salt Lake City	
1000 m	1:09.18	February 1, 2025	Pettit National Ice Center, Milwaukee	
1500 m	1:43.26	November 23, 2025	Calgary Olympic Oval, Calgary	
3000 m	3:41.22	September 30, 2023	Utah Olympic Oval, Salt Lake City	
5000 m	6:13.19	December 10, 2021	Calgary Olympic Oval, Calgary	
10000 m	13:19.27	November 22, 2020	Utah Olympic Oval, Salt Lake City	

== See also ==
- List of select Jewish speed skaters
- List of Jewish Olympic medalists
