= Alexis Contin =

French speed skater

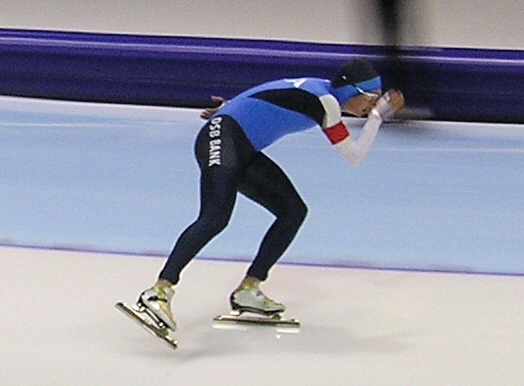
- Contin in 2007

Personal information
- Born: 19 October 1986 (age 39) Saint-Malo, France
- Height: 1.82 m (6 ft 0 in)
- Weight: 72 kg (159 lb)

Sport
- Country: France
- Sport: Speed skating
Medal record
World Championships
Silver medal – second place	2017 Gangneung	Mass start
Bronze medal – third place	2015 Heerenveen	Mass start
Bronze medal – third place	2016 Kolomna	Mass start

Alexis Contin (born 19 October 1986) is a French speed skater. He is ranked 63 on the Adelskalender and is coached by Jan van Veen.

Contin made his international speedskating debut at the Speed Skating World Cup in December 2005. In January 2007 he competed at an international allround tournament for the first time, finishing 17th at the European Championships held at Collalbo.

In January 2008, Dutch newspaper De Telegraaf reported that Contin quit skating, saying that he felt he could not bring himself to focus entirely on longtrack skating. However, Contin made a return to competitive skating in the 2008–09 season.

He competed in the Dutch marathon circuit, until he made his return to the longtrack at the 2009 European Allround Championships at Heerenveen.

He competed at the 2010 Winter Olympics, finishing 4th in the 10,000 metres and 6th in the 5000.

Contin is the holder of the current French records on the 3000 and 5000 metres distances. He also held the French record on the 10000 metres distance for almost 10 years before losing it to Timothy Loubineaud in 2020.

== Personal records ==
Personal records
Speed skating
Event	Result	Date	Location	Notes
500 m	36.57	7 March 2015	Olympic Oval, Calgary	
1000 m	1:10.25	19 January 2013	Olympic Oval, Calgary	
1500 m	1:44.00	15 November 2013	Utah Olympic Oval, Salt Lake City	
3000 m	3:40.11	25 September 2010	Olympic Oval, Calgary	Current French record.
5000 m	6:11.95	10 November 2013	Olympic Oval, Calgary	Current French record.
10000 m	13:04.80	8 March 2015	Olympic Oval, Calgary	French record until beaten by Timothy Loubineaud on 14 February 2020.
