= Li Wenhao (speed skater) =

Chinese speed skater (born 2004)

Personal information
- Born: 10 September 2004 (age 21) Hebei, China

Sport
- Country: China
- Sport: Speed skating
- Event(s): 1500 m, 5000 m, team pursuit
Medal record
Men's speed skating
Representing China
Olympic Games
Bronze medal – third place	2026 Milano Cortina	Team pursuit

Li Wenhao (Chinese: 李文淏; born 10 September 2004) is a Chinese speed skater. He represented China at the 2026 Winter Olympics.

== Career ==
In February 2024, Li competed at the 14th National Winter Games and won a gold medal in the 1500 metres.

In January 2026, he was selected to represent China at the 2026 Winter Olympics. He won a bronze medal in the team pursuit event with a time of 3:41.38.
