= Ruslan Zakharov =

Russian speed skater (born 1987)

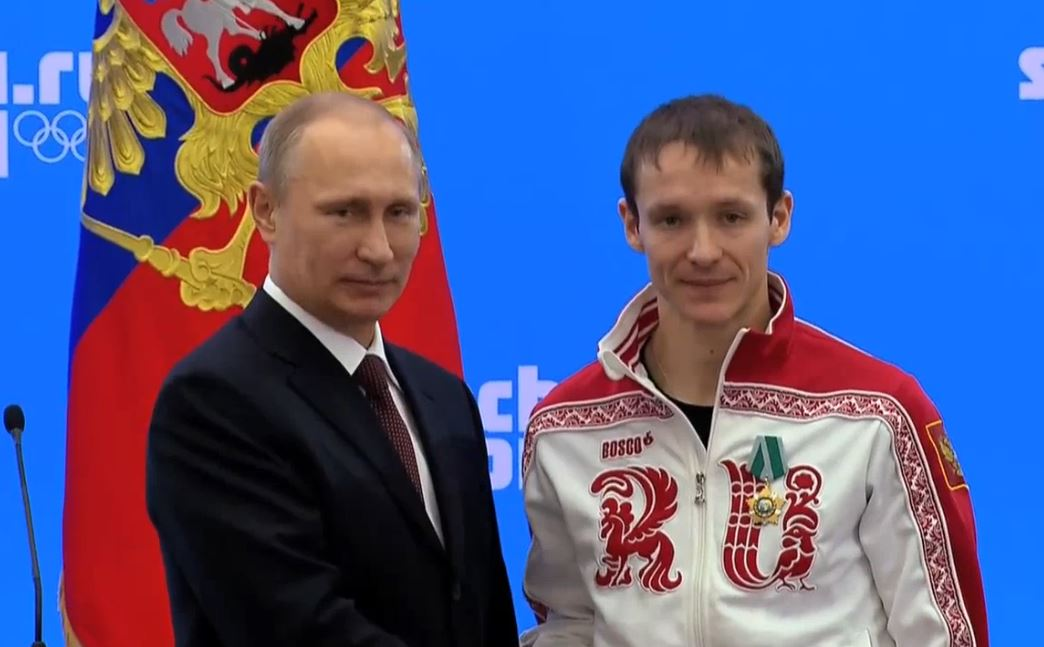
- Zakharov with Vladimir Putin on 24 February 2014

Personal information
- Nationality: (Russia) Russian
- Born: 24 March 1987 (age 39) Gorky, Russian SFSR, Soviet Union
- Height: 1.73 m (5 ft 8 in)
- Weight: 72 kg (159 lb)

Sport
- Country: Russia
- Sport: Speed skating
- Event: Mass start
- Club: CSKA Moscow

Achievements and titles
- Highest world ranking: 10 (1500m)
Medal record

Representing Russia
Men's short-track speed skating
Olympic Games
Gold medal – first place	2014 Sochi	5000 m relay
European Championships
Gold medal – first place	2013 Malmö	5000 m relay
Gold medal – first place	2014 Dresden	5000 m relay
Gold medal – first place	2015 Dordrecht	5000 m relay
Silver medal – second place	2011 Heerenveen	1500 m
Silver medal – second place	2011 Heerenveen	5000 m relay
Silver medal – second place	2012 Mladá Boleslav	5000 m relay
Silver medal – second place	2017 Turin	5000 m relay
Bronze medal – third place	2008 Ventspils	1500 m
Bronze medal – third place	2011 Heerenveen	Overall
Bronze medal – third place	2011 Heerenveen	1000 m
Men's speed skating
World Single Distances Championships
Bronze medal – third place	2020 Salt Lake City	Team pursuit
European Championships
Bronze medal – third place	2018 Kolomna	Mass start
Bronze medal – third place	2022 Heerenveen	Mass start
Representing ROC
Men's speed skating
Olympic Games
Silver medal – second place	2022 Beijing	Team pursuit
Representing Russian Skating Union
Men's speed skating
World Single Distances Championships
Bronze medal – third place	2021 Heerenveen	Team pursuit

Ruslan Albertovich Zakharov (Russian: Руслан Альбертович Захаров; born 24 March 1987) is a Russian athlete in short track and speed skater.

== Career ==
Zakharov competed at the 2010 Winter Olympics for Russia. In the 500 metres and 1000 metres, he placed fourth in his round one heat, failing to advance, and in the 1500 metres, he placed sixth, also failing to advance. His best overall finish was in the 500, where he placed 27th.

As of 2013, Zakharov's best performance at the World Championships came in 2008, when placed 8th in the 1500 metres. He also won a gold medal as a member of the Russian relay team at the 2013 European Championships, and placed 3rd in the overall competition at the 2011 European Championships.

As of 2013, Zakharov has four ISU Short Track Speed Skating World Cup podium finishes, all as part of the 5000m relay team. His best finishes are silver medals in 2012–13 at Calgary and in 2013–14 at Turin and Kolomna. His top World Cup ranking is 10th, in the 1500 metres in 2012–13.

== World Cup podiums ==
=== Short track ===
Date	Season	Location	Rank	Event
21 October 2012	2012–13	Calgary	2nd place, silver medalist(s)	5000m Relay
10 February 2013	2012–13	Sochi	3rd place, bronze medalist(s)	5000m Relay
10 November 2013	2013–14	Turin	2nd place, silver medalist(s)	5000m Relay
17 November 2013	2013–14	Kolomna	2nd place, silver medalist(s)	5000m Relay

=== Long track ===
Date	Season	Location	Rank	Event
16 November 2018	2018–19	Obihiro	1st place, gold medalist(s)	Team pursuit
24 November 2019	2019–20	Tomaszów Mazowiecki	3rd place, bronze medalist(s)	Team pursuit
8 December 2019	2019–20	Nur-Sultan	3rd place, bronze medalist(s)	Team pursuit
14 December 2019	2019–20	Nagano	1st place, gold medalist(s)	Team pursuit
13 November 2021	2021–22	Tomaszów Mazowiecki	2nd place, silver medalist(s)	Mass start

=== Overall rankings ===
Season	Event	Rank
2018–19	Mass start	3rd place, bronze medalist(s)
