= Ethan Cepuran =

American speed skater (born 2000)

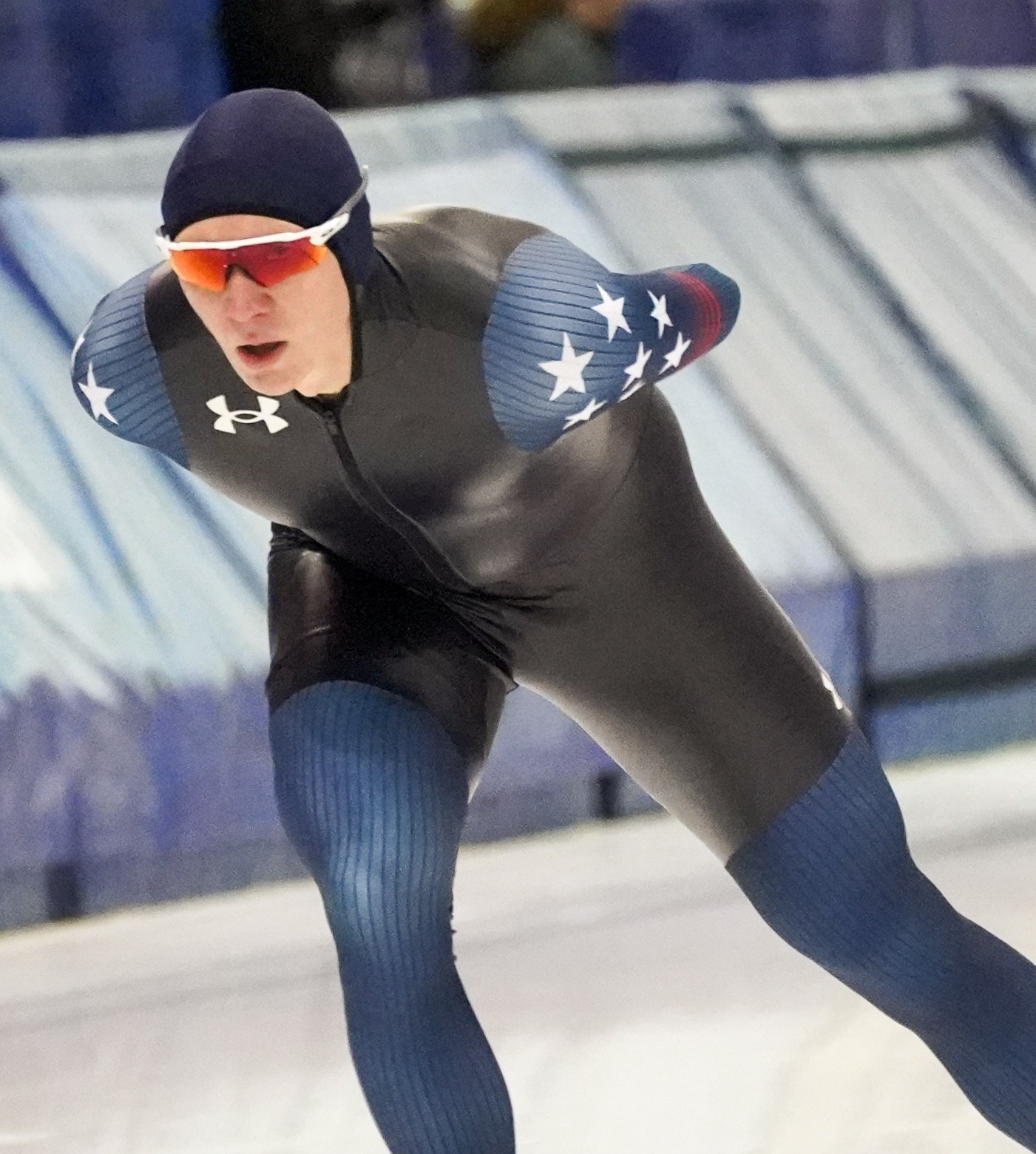
- Cepuran in 2026

Personal information
- Born: May 13, 2000 (age 26) Glen Ellyn, Illinois, U.S.
- Height: 6 ft 2 in (188 cm)

Sport
- Country: United States
- Sport: Speed skating
Medal record
Men's speed skating
Representing the United States
Olympic Games
Silver medal – second place	2026 Milano Cortina	Team pursuit
Bronze medal – third place	2022 Beijing	Team pursuit
World Single Distances Championships
Gold medal – first place	2025 Hamar	Team pursuit
Four Continents Championships
Gold medal – first place	2024 Salt Lake City	Team pursuit
Gold medal – first place	2025 Hachinohe	Team pursuit
World Junior Championships
Silver medal – second place	2018 Salt Lake City	Mass start

Ethan Cepuran (born May 13, 2000) is an American speed skater. He represented the United States at the 2022 and 2026 Winter Olympics, and is a two-time Olympic medalist in the team pursuit event, winning a bronze medal in 2022 and a silver in 2026.

== Career ==
At the junior level, Cepuran competed at the 2018 World Junior Speed Skating Championships and won a silver medal in the mass start event.

He won the 5,000 meters event at the 2022 U.S. Olympic Team Trials, becoming the first speed skater to qualify for the Olympic team. He represented the United States at the 2022 Winter Olympics in the 5000 meters and team pursuit where he won a bronze medal.

He competed at the Four Continents Speed Skating Championships in 2024 and won a gold medal in the team pursuit. He again competed at the Four Continents Speed Skating Championships in 2025 and won a gold medal in the team pursuit.

He represented the United States at the 2025 World Single Distances Speed Skating Championships and won a gold medal in the team pursuit, along with Emery Lehman and Casey Dawson. This was the United States' first World Single Distances Championship gold medal in the team pursuit since 2011.

He again represented the United States at the 2026 Winter Olympics and won a silver medal in the team pursuit event with a time of 3:43.71.

== World Cup overview ==
Key

Category
Senior level
Junior level

Season	Location	Mass Start*
2017–2018	(United States) Salt Lake City	3rd place, bronze medalist(s)
2022–2023	(Norway) Stavanger	12th
2022–2023	(Netherlands) Heerenveen	12th
2022–2023	(Canada) Calgary	5th
2022–2023	(Poland) Tomaszów Mazowiecki	4th
2022–2023	(Poland) Tomaszów Mazowiecki	5th
2023–2024	(Japan) Obihiro	7th
2023–2024	(China) Beijing	16th
2023–2024	(Norway) Stavanger	8th
2023–2024	(Poland) Tomaszów Mazowiecki	13th
2023–2024	(United States) Salt Lake City	17th
2023–2024	(Canada) Quebec	12th
2024–2025	(Japan) Nagano	15th
2024–2025	(China) Beijing	18th
2024–2025	(Canada) Calgary	9th
2024–2025	(United States) Milwaukee	15th
2024–2025	(Poland) Tomaszów Mazowiecki	11th
2024–2025	(Netherlands) Heerenveen	12th
2025–2026	(Canada) Calgary	9th
2025–2026	(Netherlands) Heerenveen	17th
2025–2026	(Norway) Hamar	11th
2025–2026	(Germany) Inzell	16th
2026–2027	(China) Beijing	3rd place, bronze medalist(s)

Season	Location	Team Pursuit*
2017–2018	(United States) Salt Lake City	5th
2021–2022	(Canada) Calgary	1st place, gold medalist(s)
2022–2023	(Norway) Stavanger	1st place, gold medalist(s)
2022–2023	(Canada) Calgary	1st place, gold medalist(s)
2022–2023	(Poland) Tomaszów Mazowiecki	2nd place, silver medalist(s)
2023–2024	(Japan) Obihiro	3rd place, bronze medalist(s)
2023–2024	(Poland) Tomaszów Mazowiecki	1st place, gold medalist(s)
2023–2024	(United States) Salt Lake City	1st place, gold medalist(s)
2024–2025	(Japan) Nagano	2nd place, silver medalist(s)
2024–2025	(United States) Milwaukee	1st place, gold medalist(s)
2024–2025	(Netherlands) Heerenveen	1st place, gold medalist(s)
2025–2026	(United States) Salt Lake City	1st place, gold medalist(s)
2025–2026	(Canada) Calgary	1st place, gold medalist(s)
2025–2026	(Norway) Hamar	1st place, gold medalist(s)
2026–2027	(China) Beijing	3rd place, bronze medalist(s)
2026–2027	(Japan) Obihiro	7th

Season	Location	500 meter
2017–2018	(United States) Salt Lake City	28th

Season	Location	1000 meter
2018–2019	(Italy) Baselga di Pinè	7th

Season	Location	1500 meter
2024–2025	(Canada) Calgary	20th

Season	Location	3000 meter
2017–2018	(United States) Salt Lake City	7th
2018–2019	(Italy) Baselga di Pinè	6th

Season	Location	5000 meter
2022–2023	(Canada) Calgary	8th
2022–2023	(Poland) Tomaszów Mazowiecki	11th
2022–2023	(Poland) Tomaszów Mazowiecki	12th
