= Bart Swings =

Belgian speed skater (born 1991)

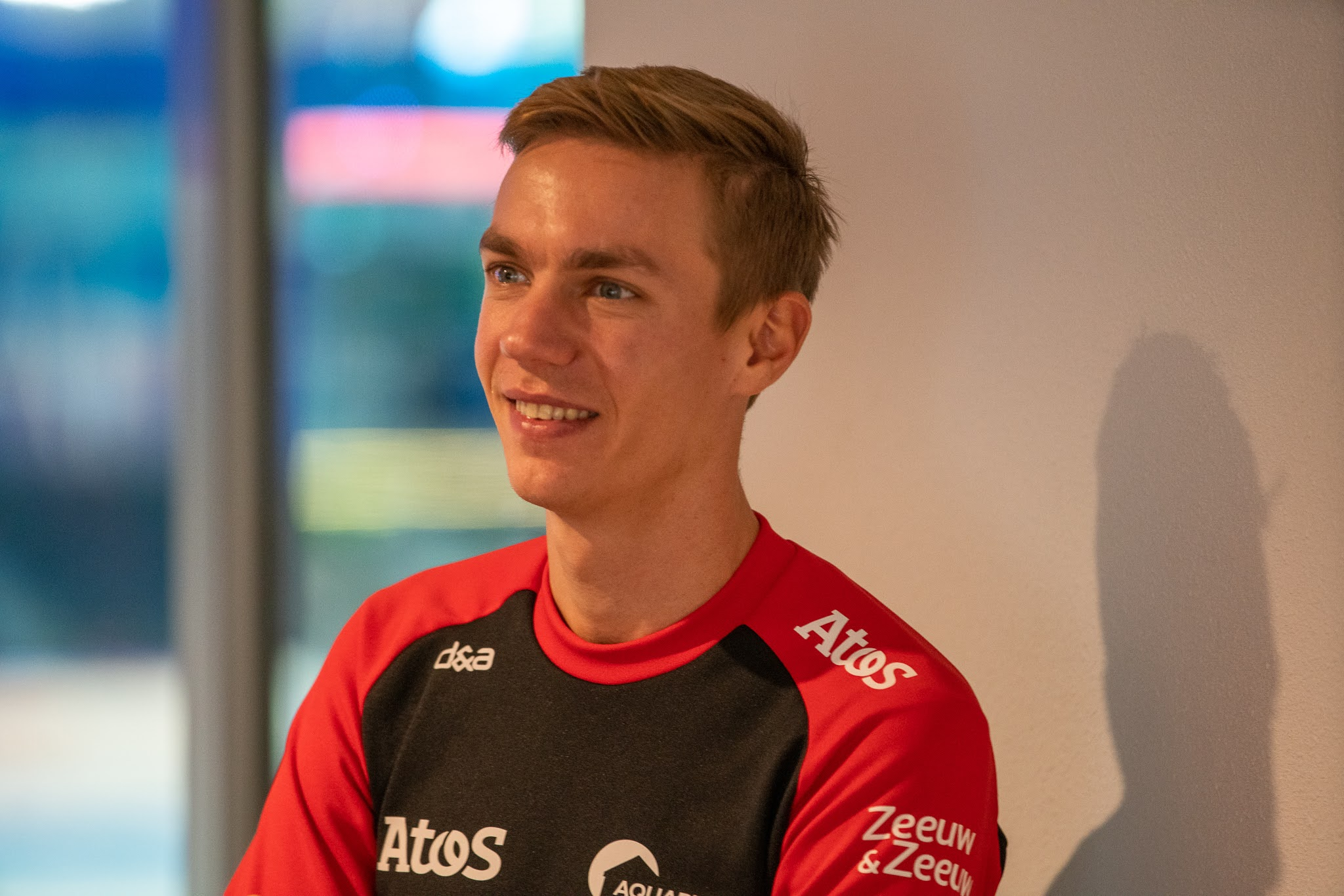
- Swings in 2020

Personal information
- Nationality: Belgian
- Born: 12 February 1991 (age 35) Herent, Belgium
- Height: 1.78 m (5 ft 10 in)
- Weight: 67 kg (148 lb)

Sport
- Country: Belgium
- Sport: Speed skating
- Event: Mass start
- Club: Team IKO
- Turned pro: 2010
Medal record
Representing Belgium
Men's speed skating
Olympic Games
Gold medal – first place	2022 Beijing	Mass start
Silver medal – second place	2018 Pyeongchang	Mass start
World Single Distances Championships
Gold medal – first place	2023 Heerenveen	Mass start
Gold medal – first place	2024 Calgary	Mass start
Bronze medal – third place	2021 Heerenveen	Mass start
Bronze medal – third place	2023 Heerenveen	5000 m
Bronze medal – third place	2025 Hamar	Mass start
World Allround Speed Skating Championships
Bronze medal – third place	2013 Hamar	Allround
Bronze medal – third place	2022 Hamar	Allround
European Championships
Gold medal – first place	2020 Heerenveen	Mass start
Gold medal – first place	2022 Heerenveen	Mass start
Gold medal – first place	2024 Heerenveen	Mass start
Gold medal – first place	2026 Tomaszów Mazowiecki	Mass start
Silver medal – second place	2016 Minsk	Allround
Bronze medal – third place	2017 Heerenveen	Allround
Bronze medal – third place	2023 Hamar	Allround
Men's inline speed skating
World Games
Gold medal – first place	2013 Cali	Track 10000 m elimination
Gold medal – first place	2013 Cali	Road 20000 m elimination
Gold medal – first place	2017 Wrocław	Road 20000 m elimination
Gold medal – first place	2017 Wrocław	Road 10000 m points
Gold medal – first place	2022 Birmingham	Track 10000 m points
Gold medal – first place	2022 Birmingham	Track 10000 m elimination
Gold medal – first place	2022 Birmingham	Road 10000 m points
Gold medal – first place	2022 Birmingham	Road 15000 m elimination
Silver medal – second place	2017 Wrocław	Track 1000 m sprint
Silver medal – second place	2013 Cali	Track 1000 m sprint
Bronze medal – third place	2013 Cali	Road 10000 m points
Bronze medal – third place	2022 Birmingham	Track 1000 m sprint
World Championships
Gold medal – first place	2009 Haining	Track 10000 m points
Gold medal – first place	2010 Guarne	Road 20000 m elimination
Gold medal – first place	2010 Guarne	Road 10000 m points
Gold medal – first place	2011 Yeosu	Track 10000 m points
Gold medal – first place	2012 A. Piceno	Road 20000 m elimination
Gold medal – first place	2012 A. Piceno	Road marathon
Gold medal – first place	2012 A. Piceno	Road 5000 m relay
Gold medal – first place	2013 Ostend	Track 10000 m points
Gold medal – first place	2013 Ostend	Track 3000 m relay
Gold medal – first place	2013 Ostend	Track 1000 m sprint
Gold medal – first place	2013 Ostend	Road 10000 m points
Gold medal – first place	2018 Arnhem-Heerde	Road 20000 m elimination
Gold medal – first place	2019 Barcelona	Road 15000 m elimination
Gold medal – first place	2019 Barcelona	Track 10000 m points
Gold medal – first place	2019 Barcelona	Track 1000 m sprint
Gold medal – first place	2023 Montecchio Maggiore	Track 1000 m sprint
Gold medal – first place	2023 Vicenza	Road 10000 m points
Gold medal – first place	2023 Vicenza	Road 15000 m elimination
Gold medal – first place	2023 Vicenza	Road marathon
Gold medal – first place	2024 Montesilvano-Sulmona	Track 5000 m points
Gold medal – first place	2024 Montesilvano-Sulmona	Road 10000 m points
Silver medal – second place	2009 Haining	Road 20000 m elimination
Silver medal – second place	2010 Guarne	Track 20000 m elimination
Silver medal – second place	2010 Guarne	Track 10000 m points
Silver medal – second place	2011 Yeosu	Track 15000 m elimination
Silver medal – second place	2011 Yeosu	Road 20000 m elimination
Silver medal – second place	2011 Yeosu	Road 10000 m points
Silver medal – second place	2012 A. Piceno	Track 10000 m points
Silver medal – second place	2018 Arnhem-Heerde	Track 10000 m elimination
Silver medal – second place	2019 Barcelona	Road marathon
Silver medal – second place	2019 Barcelona	Road 10000 m elimination
Silver medal – second place	2023 Montecchio Maggiore	Track 10000 m elimination
Silver medal – second place	2024 Montesilvano-Sulmona	Track 1000 m sprint
Bronze medal – third place	2010 Guarne	Road marathon
Bronze medal – third place	2011 Yeosu	Track 3000 m relay
Bronze medal – third place	2011 Yeosu	Road 5000 m relay
Bronze medal – third place	2012 A. Piceno	Track 20000 m elimination
Bronze medal – third place	2013 Ostend	Road marathon
Bronze medal – third place	2018 Arnhem-Heerde	Road 10000 m points
Bronze medal – third place	2018 Arnhem-Heerde	Track 15000 m elimination
Bronze medal – third place	2019 Barcelona	Road 10000 m points
Bronze medal – third place	2019 Barcelona	Track 3000 m relay
Bronze medal – third place	2023 Montecchio Maggiore	Track 10000 m points-elim
European Championships
Gold medal – first place	2009 Ostend	Track 1000 m
Gold medal – first place	2009 Ostend	Track 10k points-elim
Gold medal – first place	2009 Ostend	Track 3k relay
Gold medal – first place	2009 Ostend	Road 5k relay
Gold medal – first place	2009 Ostend	Road marathon
Gold medal – first place	2010 S. Benedetto	Track 1000 m
Gold medal – first place	2010 S. Benedetto	Track 10k points-elim
Gold medal – first place	2010 S. Benedetto	Road 20k elimination
Gold medal – first place	2010 S. Benedetto	Road 10k points
Gold medal – first place	2010 S. Benedetto	Road 5k relay
Gold medal – first place	2011 Heerde	Track 1000 m
Gold medal – first place	2011 Heerde	Track 10k points-elim
Gold medal – first place	2011 Heerde	Track 15k elimination
Gold medal – first place	2011 Heerde	Road 20k elimination
Gold medal – first place	2011 Heerde	Road 10k points
Gold medal – first place	2011 Heerde	Road 5k relay
Gold medal – first place	2012 Szeged	Track 500 m
Gold medal – first place	2013 Almere	Road marathon
Gold medal – first place	2014 Geisingen	Track 1000 m
Gold medal – first place	2014 Geisingen	Track 3k relay
Gold medal – first place	2014 Geisingen	Road 20k elimination
Gold medal – first place	2014 Geisingen	Road 5k relay
Gold medal – first place	2015 Wörgl	Track 1000 m
Gold medal – first place	2015 Wörgl	Track 10k points-elim
Gold medal – first place	2015 Wörgl	Road marathon
Gold medal – first place	2016 Heerde	Road 20k elimination
Gold medal – first place	2017 Lagos	Road marathon
Gold medal – first place	2017 Lagos	Track 3k relay
Gold medal – first place	2018 Ostend	Road marathon
Gold medal – first place	2022 L'Aquila	Track 10k points-elim
Gold medal – first place	2022 L'Aquila	Road 10k points
Gold medal – first place	2022 L'Aquila	Road 15k elimination
Silver medal – second place	2009 Ostend	Track 15k elimination
Silver medal – second place	2010 S. Benedetto	Track 3k relay
Silver medal – second place	2015 Wörgl	Track 15k elimination
Silver medal – second place	2015 Wörgl	Road 10k points
Silver medal – second place	2015 Wörgl	Road 20k elimination
Silver medal – second place	2016 Heerde	Track 1000 m
Silver medal – second place	2017 Lagos	Track 1000 m
Silver medal – second place	2017 Lagos	Track 10 k points
Silver medal – second place	2022 L'Aquila	Track 10k elimination
Silver medal – second place	2022 L'Aquila	Track 3k relay
Silver medal – second place	2022 L'Aquila	Road marathon
Bronze medal – third place	2009 Ostend	Road 20k elimination
Bronze medal – third place	2012 Szeged	Track 15k elimination
Bronze medal – third place	2012 Szeged	Track 3k relay
Bronze medal – third place	2014 Geisingen	Road 5k relay
Bronze medal – third place	2015 Wörgl	Track 3k relay

Bart Swings (born 12 February 1991) is a Belgian long track speed skater and inline speed skater. He is the 2022 Olympic champion on the speed skating mass start. Swings won Belgium's first gold medal in 74 years and is the first Belgian athlete ever to have won two medals in the Winter Olympics. In 2023 he won the Belgian National Sports Merit Award, the highest trophy for a sportsperson or team in Belgium.

== Career ==
At his first world championship speed skating event, the 2011 World Single Distance Speed Skating Championships in Inzell, Germany, he finished 17th in the 5000 m.

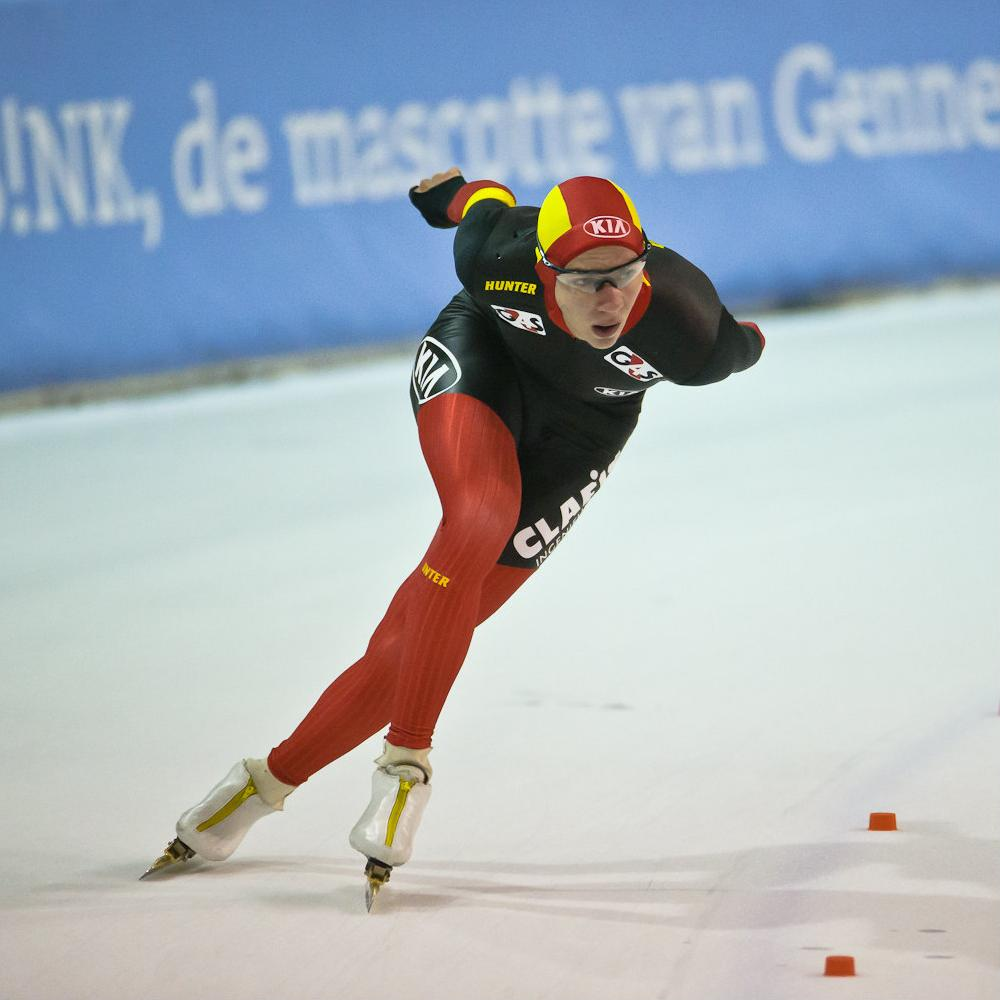
Swings in 2012

At the 2012 World Allround Speed Skating Championships in Moscow, he finished 9th overall, with a personal record at the 500 m and a national record at the 1500 m.

At the 2013 World Allround Speed Skating Championships in Hamar, he finished 3rd overall and took the Bronze medal back home to Belgium.

At the 2018 Winter Olympics in Pyeongchang, he won a silver medal in the 1st ever Mass start at the Winter Olympics. Four years later, he won the gold medal in this event. It was Belgium's second-ever gold medal in the Winter Olympics history and the first for an individual male athlete.

At the 2019 World Single Distances Speed Skating Championships, he took the lead in the men's mass start but crashed on the final lap, costing him the podium.

At the 2021 World Single Distances Speed Skating Championships, he won bronze in the men's mass start, winning his first-ever medal in a World Single Distances Speed Skating Championship event.

At the 2022 Berlin Marathon, he crossed the finish line in 56:45 minutes and set a new course record. At the same time, he secured his eighth victory at the BMW BERLIN-MARATHON inline skating.

At the World Games, he won seven medals, including four gold. He won two gold, one silver and one bronze at The World Games 2013 in Cali, Colombia and two gold and one silver at the World Games 2017 in Wroclaw, Poland.

Swings is currently studying for an engineer's degree at the Katholieke Universiteit Leuven.

His brother Maarten Swings also competes in inline speed skating and speed skating, participating in the inline skating world championships and qualifying for the ISU Speed Skating World Cup.

== Personal records ==
Personal records
Speed skating
Event	Result	Date	Location	Notes
500 m	36.36	9 March 2024	Max Aicher Arena, Inzell	
1000 m	1.09.28	14 November 2015	Olympic Oval, Calgary	
1500 m	1:42.48	15 November 2015	Olympic Oval, Calgary	Current Belgian record.
3000 m	3:36.98	19 December 2020	Thialf, Heerenveen	Current Belgian record.
5000 m	6:08.76	3 December 2021	Utah Olympic Oval, Salt Lake City	Current Belgian record.
10000 m	12:44.75	6 December 2025	Thialf, Heerenveen	Current Belgian record.
Team pursuit	3:45.64	16 November 2013	Utah Olympic Oval, Salt Lake City	Current Belgian record (with Ferre Spruyt and Maarten Swings).

As of 23 November 2015, his highest ranking on the all-time Adelskalender is 11th.
