= Lee Seung-hoon (speed skater) =

South Korean speed skater (born 1988)

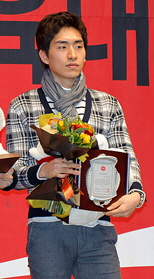

Personal information
- Born: 6 March 1988 (age 38) Seoul, South Korea
- Height: 1.77 m (5 ft 10 in)
- Weight: 70 kg (154 lb)

Sport
- Country: South Korea
- Sport: Speed skating Short track speed skating
Medal record
Representing South Korea
Men's speed skating
Olympic Games
Gold medal – first place	2010 Vancouver	10,000 m
Gold medal – first place	2018 Pyeongchang	Mass start
Silver medal – second place	2010 Vancouver	5000 m
Silver medal – second place	2014 Sochi	Team pursuit
Silver medal – second place	2018 Pyeongchang	Team pursuit
Bronze medal – third place	2022 Beijing	Mass start
World Single Distance Championships
Gold medal – first place	2016 Kolomna	Mass start
Silver medal – second place	2011 Inzell	5000 m
Silver medal – second place	2013 Sochi	Team pursuit
Silver medal – second place	2025 Hamar	Mass start
Bronze medal – third place	2015 Heerenveen	Team pursuit
Asian Winter Games
Gold medal – first place	2011 Astana-Almaty	5000 m
Gold medal – first place	2011 Astana-Almaty	10,000 m
Gold medal – first place	2011 Astana-Almaty	Mass start
Gold medal – first place	2017 Sapporo	5000 m
Gold medal – first place	2017 Sapporo	10,000 m
Gold medal – first place	2017 Sapporo	Mass start
Gold medal – first place	2017 Sapporo	Team pursuit
Silver medal – second place	2011 Astana-Almaty	Team pursuit
Silver medal – second place	2025 Harbin	Team pursuit
Four Continents Championships
Silver medal – second place	2023 Quebec	5000 m
Silver medal – second place	2023 Quebec	Mass start
Men's short track speed skating
World Championships
Gold medal – first place	2008 Gangneung	3000 m
Gold medal – first place	2008 Gangneung	5000 m relay
Silver medal – second place	2005 Beijing	5000 m relay
Bronze medal – third place	2005 Beijing	1500 m
World Team Championships
Silver medal – second place	2005 Chuncheon	Team
Bronze medal – third place	2008 Harbin	Team
Winter Universiade
Gold medal – first place	2009 Harbin	1000 m
Gold medal – first place	2009 Harbin	1500 m
Gold medal – first place	2009 Harbin	3000 m
Gold medal – first place	2007 Torino	5000 m relay
Silver medal – second place	2007 Torino	1000 m
Silver medal – second place	2007 Torino	3000 m
Bronze medal – third place	2009 Harbin	5000 m relay
Bronze medal – third place	2007 Torino	1500 m

- Lee Seung-hoon
- Hangul: 이승훈
- Hanja: 李承勳
- RR: I Seunghun
- MR: I Sŭnghun

Lee Seung-hoon (Korean: 이승훈; Korean pronunciation: [i.sɯŋ.ɦun]; born 6 March 1988) is a South Korean speed skater. He won a gold medal in the 10,000 metres, a silver medal in the 5000 meters at the 2010 Winter Olympics, becoming the first and only Asian man ever to achieve these feats, a gold medal in mass-start at the 2018 Winter Olympics, a gold medal in the mass start at the 2016 World Championships in Kolomna, and a bronze medal in mass-start at the 2022 Winter Olympics. He was a short track speed skater, winning the 2008 World Championship 3000 m super-final and three gold medals at the 2009 Winter Universiade. Lee converted to long track in September 2009, as he failed to earn his spot on the South Korea national short track team in the national trials.

== Early life ==
Lee Seung-hoon started skating in first grade at Lila Elementary School. However, when the Asian Financial Crisis hit South Korea, his father's business failed in 1998 when he was in the fourth grade. Lee's parents tried to get their son to give up skating because they could no longer afford the training fee. Although they sold their car, Lee insisted on continuing skating and went to the ice rink by bus. Lee was a short track speed skater at Sinmonk High School and Korea National Sport University, but the competition between skaters was very high. Lee was evaluated as a rising rookie but could not surpass Ahn Hyun-Soo and Lee Ho-Suk.

Lee faced a wall after not being selected as a national player in the South Korean national competition held in April 2009. Since Lee was expected to become one of the national skaters, his frustration over the result could have led him to give up skating. However, after long consideration, Lee declared in front of his family that he would switch to long track speed skating. Lee assumed he could at least become a candidate in the other genre even though Choi Geun-won was considered the long track speed skater expected to represent South Korea. Lee excelled, skating a record of 6 minutes 48 seconds and defeating Choi to become a South Korean national skater.

Lee has been close friends with gold medalists Mo Tae-bum and Lee Sang-hwa since they were in grade school. In speed skating at the 2010 Winter Olympics, Mo won the gold medal in the men's 500-meter race and took silver in the 1000-meter race, while Lee Sang-hwa won the women's 500 meters.

== Career ==
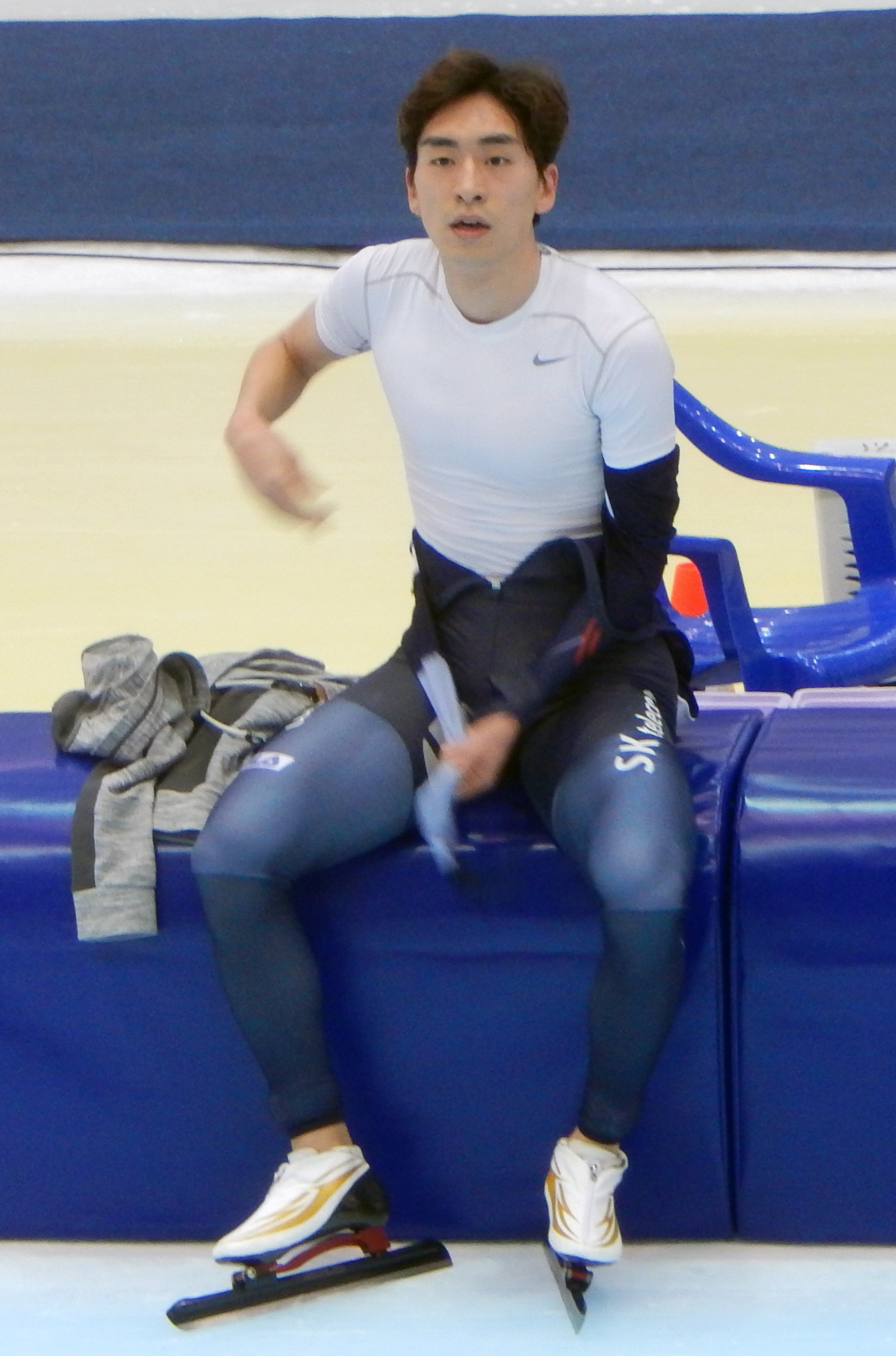
Lee in Kolomna at the 2016 Single Distance World Championships after the finish of 10000m race

One of Lee's first major international competitions was at the 2009 Winter Universiade in Harbin, China. Lee captured three gold medals in short track speed skating in the 1000, 1500 and 3000 metre events, a feat only bettered by countryman Sung Si-Bak during the 2007 Winter Universiade in Turin, Italy, winning every distance, the 500, 1000, 1500, 3000 and 5000 m relay. Despite his successes, Lee shocked many observers by failing to earn a spot on South Korea's national short track team in April 2009. Later that year, in September, Lee switched from short track to long track speed skating.

On 4 January 2010, in an interview with Arirang, Lee was quoted during an interview as saying: "I would like to tear down the barriers and show the world that Asians can excel in the speed skating program, too, not just in the short track program." Most commentators pointed out that at the time no Asian had ever won a medal in long-distance speed skating categories at the Olympics. Relatively obscure in his new field, Lee surprised everyone by finishing the men's 5000 meters in a time of 6 minutes, 16.95 seconds at the 2010 Winter Olympics, placing second only behind Sven Kramer of the Netherlands who clocked in at 6 minutes, 14.60 seconds. He then went on to win the gold medal in the 10000 meter final after Kramer was disqualified for finishing in the wrong lane. Lee stated afterward: "My coaches told me at first that Kramer had made a mistake, and I saw it on the replay they were showing on the big screen. I want to compete with Kramer again."

In 2021, Lee signed a contract with IHQ.

In October 2025, after not having qualified for the 2026 Winter Olympics, Lee retired from international competitions.

== Records ==
=== Personal records ===
Personal records
Men's speed skating
Event	Result	Date	Location	Notes
500 m	36.34	7 March 2015	Olympic Oval, Calgary	
1000 m	1:23.90	1 December 2001	Korea National Training Center, Seoul	
1500 m	1:45.93	8 March 2015	Olympic Oval, Calgary	
3000 m	3:39.43	12 August 2012	Olympic Oval, Calgary	Current South Korean record
5000 m	6:07.04	10 November 2013	Olympic Oval, Calgary	Current South Korean record
10000 m	12:55.54	15 February 2018	Gangneung Oval, Gangneung, South Korea	Current South Korean record

=== Olympic records ===
Distance	Time	Date	Location	Source
10000 m	12:58.55	24 February 2010	Richmond	

=== Olympic Games ===
7 medals – (2 gold, 3 silver, 1 bronze)

Event	500 m	1000 m	1500 m	5000 m	10000 m	Mass Start	Team pursuit
(Canada) 2010 Vancouver	—	—	—	Silver	Gold	—	5th
(Russia) 2014 Sochi	—	—	—	12th	4th	—	Silver
(South Korea) 2018 Pyeongchang	—	—	—	5th	4th	Gold	Silver
(China) 2022 Beijing	—	—	—	—	—	Bronze	6th
