= Viktor Hald Thorup =

Danish speed skater (born 1994)

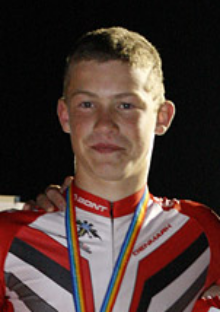
- Hald Thorup in 2009, aged 15

Personal information
- Nationality: Denmark
- Born: 14 August 1994 (age 32) Slagelse, Denmark
- Spouse: Sofia Thorup (m. 2023)

Sport
- Country: Denmark (2018-)
- Sport: Speed skating
Medal record
Men's speed skating
Representing the Denmark
Olympic Games
Silver medal – second place	2026 Milano Cortina	Mass start

Viktor Hald Thorup (born 14 August 1994) is a Danish speed skater who competes internationally.

At the 2026 Winter Olympics, Thorup won a silver medal in the men's mass start event. With this result, he became Denmark's second ever medalist at the Winter Olympics, almost three decades after the women's curling second place at the 1998 Olympics edition in Nagano, Japan. He also became the first Dane to earn a Winter Olympics medal in an individual event.

Viktor Hald Thorup currently holds Danish national records in the men's 1500m, 3000m, 5000m and 10000m.

== Career ==
Thorup started inline skating in 2002. At the age of 15 he moved to Toulouse, France to train together with Pascal Briand.

In 2012 he moved to Berlin and started ice skating.

He also participated at the 2018 Winter Olympics finished in 5th place in the Mass Start which was raced for the first time at the Olympic games in PyeongChang.

He qualified for the 2022 Winter Olympics in the 5000m discipline. Here he finished 19th out of 20. He also participated in the mass start, but did not go on from the semifinals.

== Private ==
He is married to the Russian born speedskater Sofia Prosvirnova. They lived in Russia in 2021 and 2022, but moved to Denmark following the 2022 Russian invasion of Ukraine, where his wife later is waiting for the approval of her application for Danish citizenship and chose to represent Denmark at the European Championship.

== Personal records ==
Event	Time	Date	Location
500m	38.30	October 23, 2020	(United States) Salt Lake City
1000m	1:12.69	August 31, 2019	(United States) Salt Lake City
1500m	1:45.44	November 23, 2025	(Canada) Calgary
3000m	3:44.36	January 19, 2019	(United States) Salt Lake City
5000m	6:13.43	November 21, 2025	(Canada) Calgary
10000m	12:51.88	December 6, 2025	(Netherlands) Heerenveen
