= Andrea Giovannini =

Italian speed skater (born 1993)

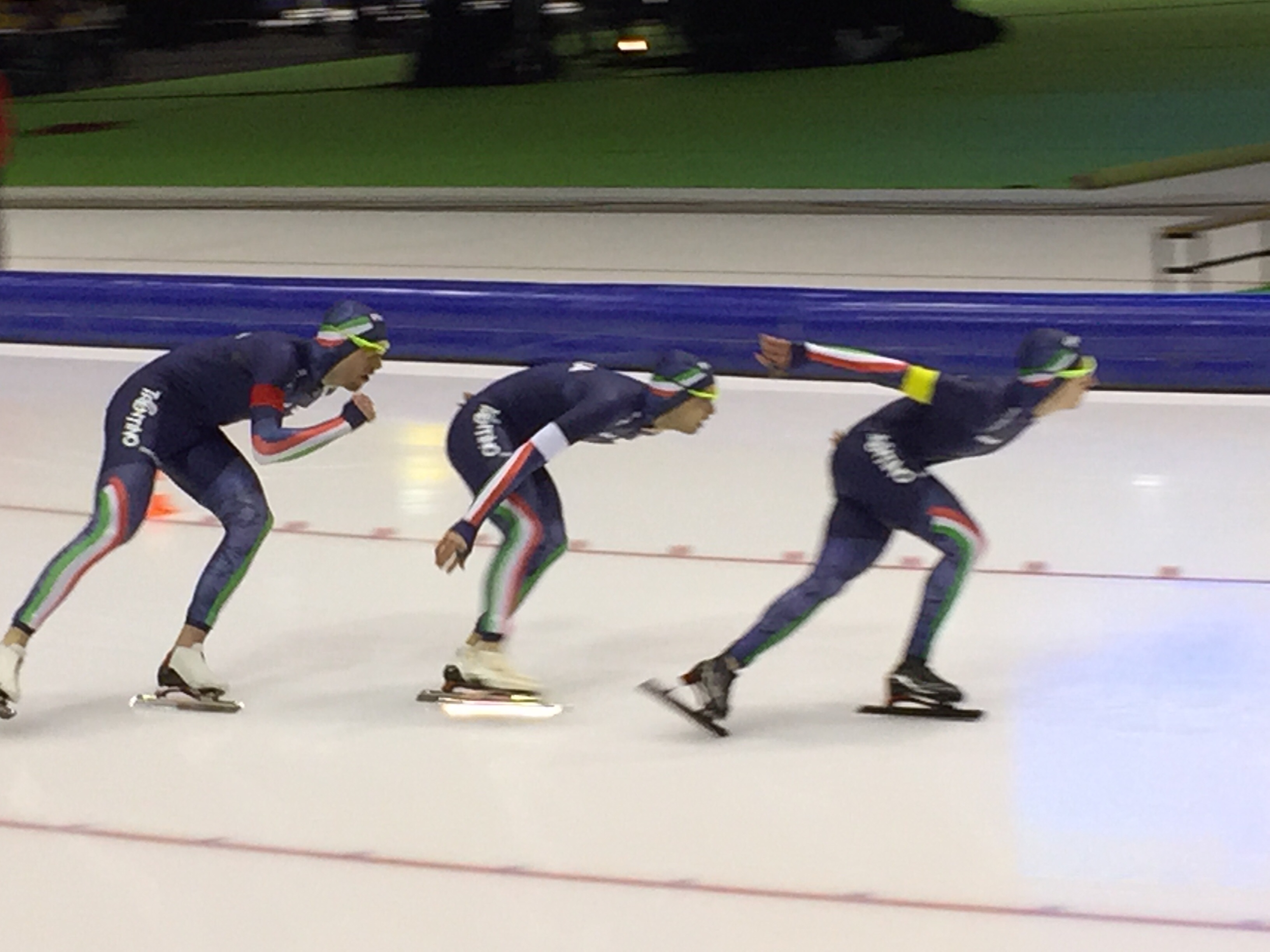
- Giovannini in 2015

Personal information
- Born: 27 August 1993 (age 32) Trento, Italy
- Height: 1.78 m (5 ft 10 in)
- Weight: 73 kg (161 lb)

Sport
- Country: Italy
- Sport: Speed skating

Achievements and titles
- Highest world ranking: 1 (mass start)
Medal record
Men's speed skating
Representing Italy
Olympic Games
Gold medal – first place	2026 Milano Cortina	Team pursuit
Bronze medal – third place	2026 Milano Cortina	Mass start
World Single Distances Championships
Gold medal – first place	2024 Calgary	Team pursuit
Gold medal – first place	2025 Hamar	Mass start
Silver medal – second place	2025 Hamar	Team pursuit
Bronze medal – third place	2023 Heerenveen	Mass start
European Championships
Gold medal – first place	2026 Tomaszów Mazowiecki	Team pursuit
Silver medal – second place	2018 Kolomna	Mass start
Silver medal – second place	2024 Heerenveen	Team pursuit
Bronze medal – third place	2022 Heerenveen	Team pursuit
Bronze medal – third place	2026 Tomaszów Mazowiecki	Mass start

Andrea Giovannini (born 27 August 1993) is an Italian speed skater.

== Career ==
Giovannini competed at the 2014 Winter Olympics for Italy. He competed in the 5000 metres, finishing 17th.

As of September 2014, Giovannini's best performance at the World Allround Championships is 17th, in 2014. He also won three medals at the 2013 World Junior Championships, including gold in the team pursuit.

Giovannini made his World Cup debut in March 2013. As of March 2025, Giovannini has eight World Cup victories in mass start races. He won two classifications in the mass start, in 2023-24 and 2024-25.

== Personal records ==
Personal records
Men's speed skating
Event	Result	Date	Location	Notes
500 m	36:57	7 March 2015	Olympic Oval, Calgary	
1000 m	1.10.56	20 October 2017	Eisstadion Inzell, Inzell	
1500 m	1:44.17	3 December 2017	Olympic Oval, Calgary	
3000 m	3:40.07	7 October 2017	Eisstadion Inzell, Inzell	
5000 m	6:08.80	10 December 2017	Utah Olympic Oval, Salt Lake City	
10000 m	12:53.98	16 December 2025	Thialf, Heerenveen	

He is currently in 29th position in the adelskalender.
