= Livio Wenger =

Swiss speed skater (born 1993)

Personal information
- Nationality: Swiss
- Born: 20 January 1993 (age 33) Kriens, Switzerland
- Height: 175 cm (5 ft 9 in)
- Weight: 70 kg (154 lb)

Sport
- Sport: Speed skating
Medal record
Representing Switzerland
Men's speed skating
World Single Distances Championships
Bronze medal – third place	2024 Calgary	Mass start
European Championships
Silver medal – second place	2022 Heerenveen	Mass start
Bronze medal – third place	2020 Heerenveen	Team sprint
Men's inline speed skating
World Championships
Bronze medal – third place	2024 Montesilvano-Sulmona	Road 10000 m points
World Games
Silver medal – second place	2017 Wrocław	Track 10000 m elimination
Silver medal – second place	2025 Chengdu	Track 10000 m elimination
Bronze medal – third place	2025 Chengdu	Track 5000 m elimination

Livio Wenger (born 20 January 1993) is a Swiss long track speed skater and inline speed skater. In 2017, he competed in World Games 2017 in Wrocław, Poland where he won a silver medal in the 10k track points-elimination. At the 2018 Winter Olympics he competed in the 1500 metres, 5000 metres and in the Mass start where he finished fourth.

== Personal records ==
Personal records
Men's speed skating
Event	Result	Date	Location	Notes
500 m	36.52	2 March 2019	Olympic Oval, Calgary	
1000 m	1.09.79	2 December 2017	Olympic Oval, Calgary	Current Swiss record.
1500 m	1:44.09	16 February 2020	Utah Olympic Oval, Salt Lake City	Current Swiss record.
3000 m	3:41.05	23 February 2019	Olympic Oval, Calgary	Current Swiss record.
5000 m	6:12.13	3 December 2021	Utah Olympic Oval, Salt Lake City	Current Swiss record.
10000 m	13:16.42	26 January 2025	Olympic Oval, Calgary	
