= Gabriel Odor =

Austrian speed skater (born 2000)

Personal information
- Nationality: Austrian
- Born: 23 August 2000 (age 25) Hall in Tirol, Austria
- Height: 185 cm (6 ft 1 in)
- Weight: 80 kg (176 lb)

Sport
- Sport: Speed skating
Medal record
Men's speed skating
Representing Austria
European Championships
Silver medal – second place	2024 Heerenveen	Mass start
World Junior Championships
Gold medal – first place	2019 Baselga di Pinè	Mass start
Silver medal – second place	2020 Tomaszów Mazowiecki	Mass start

Gabriel Odor (born 23 August 2000) is an Austrian speed skater who competed at the 2022 and 2026 Winter Olympics.

== Career ==
During the 2019 World Junior Speed Skating Championships, he became first Austrian male skater to win a World Junior Championship.

Odor represented Austria at the 2022 Winter Olympics in the mass start event.
