= Denmark at the 1984 Summer Olympics =

- IOC code: DEN
- NOC: Danish Olympic Committee

in Los Angeles
- Competitors: 60 (49 men and 11 women) in 11 sports
- Flag bearer: Michael Marcussen
- Medals Ranked 27th: Gold 0 Silver 3 Bronze 3 Total 6

Summer Olympics appearances (overview)
- 1896; 1900; 1904; 1908; 1912; 1920; 1924; 1928; 1932; 1936; 1948; 1952; 1956; 1960; 1964; 1968; 1972; 1976; 1980; 1984; 1988; 1992; 1996; 2000; 2004; 2008; 2012; 2016; 2020; 2024

Other related appearances
- 1906 Intercalated Games

Denmark competed at the 1984 Summer Olympics in Los Angeles, United States. 60 competitors, 49 men and 11 women, took part in 33 events in 11 sports.

== Medalists ==
Medal	Name	Sport	Event	Date
Silver	Ole Riber Rasmussen	Shooting	Mixed skeet	4 August
Silver	Henning Lynge Jakobsen	Canoeing	Men's C-1 500 metres	10 August
Silver	Anne Grethe Jensen	Equestrian	Individual dressage	10 August
Bronze	Hanne Eriksen; Birgitte Hanel; Lotte Koefoed; Bodil Steen Rasmussen; Jette Sørensen	Rowing	Women's quadruple sculls	4 August
Bronze	Michael Jessen; Lars Nielsen; Per Rasmussen; Erik Christiansen	Rowing	Men's coxless four	5 August
Bronze	Henning Lynge Jakobsen	Canoeing	Men's C-1 1000 metres	11 August

== Athletics ==
Men's Marathon

- Henrik Jørgensen — 2:15:55 (→ 19th place)
- Allan Zachariassen — 2:17:10 (→ 25th place)

Women's Marathon

- Dorthe Rasmussen
  - Final — 2:33:40 (→ 13th place)

== Cycling ==
Thirteen cyclists, twelve men and one woman, represented Denmark in 1984.

Men's individual road race

- Per Pedersen — +11:46 (→ 24th place)
- Kim Eriksen — +15:30 (→ 40th place)
- Ole Byriel — did not finish (→ no ranking)
- Søren Lilholt — did not finish (→ no ranking)

Team time trial

- John Carlsen
- Kim Eriksen
- Lars Jensen
- Søren Lilholt

1000m time trial

- Claus Rasmussen

Individual pursuit

- Jørgen V. Pedersen
- Henning Larsen

Team pursuit

- Dan Frost
- Michael Markussen
- Jørgen V. Pedersen
- Brian Holm

Points race

- Michael Markussen
- Brian Holm

Women's individual road race

- Helle Sørensen — 2:13:28 (→ 7th place)

== Handball ==
=== Men's team competition ===
- Preliminary Round (Group B)
  - Defeated Spain (21–16)
  - Defeated South Korea (31–28)
  - Defeated United States (19–16)
  - Defeated Sweden (26–19)
  - Lost to West Germany (18–20)
- Bronze Medal Match
  - Lost to Romania (19–23) → Fourth place
- Team Roster
  - Morten Stig Christensen
  - Anders Dahl-Nielsen
  - Peter Fenger
  - Jørgen Gluver
  - Hans Hattesen
  - Carsten Haurum
  - Klaus Jensen
  - Mogens Jeppesen
  - Keld Nielsen
  - Erik Rasmussen
  - Jens Roepstorff
  - Per Skaarup
  - Poul Sørensen
  - Mikael Strøm

== Sailing ==
Open

Athlete	Event	Race							Net points	Final rank
Athlete	Event	1	2	3	4	5	6	7	Net points	Final rank
Jørgen Bojsen-Møller; Jacob Bojsen-Møller	Flying Dutchman	1	6	~~8~~	8	7	3	4	52.4	4
Paul Elvstrøm; Trine Elvstrøm-Myralf	Tornado	6	3	5	3	~~14~~	4	5	51.1	4
Jesper Bank; Thomas Andersen; Jan Mathiasen	Soling	8	~~13~~	7	12	7	12	10	92.5	12

== Swimming ==
Men's 100m Freestyle

- Peter Rohde
  - Heat — 51.40
  - B-Final — 51.98 (→ 16th place)
- Franz Mortensen
  - Heat — 52.22 (→ did not advance, 24th place)

Men's 200m Freestyle

- Franz Mortensen
  - Heat — 1:54.09 (→ did not advance, 23rd place)

Men's 400m Freestyle

- Franz Mortensen
  - Heat — 4:11.97 (→ did not advance, 31st place)

Men's 100m Butterfly

- Søren Østberg
  - Heat — 55.73
  - B-Final — 56.04 (→ 15th place)

Men's 200m Butterfly

- Søren Østberg
  - Heat — 2:06.12 (→ did not advance, 25th place)

Men's 200m Individual Medley

- Peter Rohde
  - Heat — 2:07.93
  - B-Final — 2:07.10 (→ 13th place)
