= Denmark at the Olympics =

- IOC code: DEN
- NOC: National Olympic Committee and Sports Confederation of Denmark
- Website: www.dif.dk (in Danish and English)
- Medals Ranked 30th: Gold 50 Silver 82 Bronze 84 Total 216

Summer appearances
- 1896; 1900; 1904; 1908; 1912; 1920; 1924; 1928; 1932; 1936; 1948; 1952; 1956; 1960; 1964; 1968; 1972; 1976; 1980; 1984; 1988; 1992; 1996; 2000; 2004; 2008; 2012; 2016; 2020; 2024; 2028

Winter appearances
- 1948; 1952; 1956; 1960; 1964; 1968; 1972–1984; 1988; 1992; 1994; 1998; 2002; 2006; 2010; 2014; 2018; 2022; 2026

Other related appearances
- 1906 Intercalated Games

Denmark first participated at the Olympic Games at the inaugural 1896 Games. Since then, the nation has maintained a consistent presence at the Summer Olympic Games, participating in every edition except for the 1904 Games in St. Louis, which were attended by only a handful of countries due to travel difficulties and limited international participation. Denmark has also participated in the Winter Olympic Games several times since 1948, including every Games since 1988.

Danish athletes have competed across a wide range of sports, with sailing emerging as the country's most successful discipline in terms of medal achievements. Other sports in which Denmark has performed well include cycling, rowing, handball (leading nation at the Olympics), and badminton—the latter gaining prominence in recent decades. While the country does not have a strong tradition in winter sports compared to its summer achievements, it secured its first Winter Olympic medal at the 1998 Nagano Games, where the women's curling team won a silver medal, marking a historic moment for Danish winter sports.

In addition to its sporting achievements, Denmark have won medals in one of the three discontinued Olympic non-sport competitions, winning five silver and four bronze medals at the art competitions.

The National Olympic Committee representing Denmark, known as Danmarks Idrætsforbund, was established in 1905, playing a central role in organizing Denmark's Olympic efforts and supporting its athletes across both Summer and Winter Games.

== Medal tables ==
=== Medals by Summer Games ===
| Games | Athletes | Gold | Silver | Bronze | Total | Rank |
|---|---|---|---|---|---|---|
| (Kingdom of Greece) 1896 Athens | 3 | 1 | 2 | 3 | 6 | 9 |
| (French Third Republic) 1900 Paris | 13 | 1 | 3 | 2 | 6 | 10 |
| (United States) 1904 St. Louis | did not participate | | | | | |
| (United Kingdom) 1908 London | 101 | 0 | 2 | 3 | 5 | 16 |
| (Sweden) 1912 Stockholm | 152 | 1 | 6 | 5 | 12 | 14 |
| (Belgium) 1920 Antwerp | 154 | 3 | 9 | 1 | 13 | 10 |
| (French Third Republic) 1924 Paris | 89 | 2 | 5 | 2 | 9 | 12 |
| (Netherlands) 1928 Amsterdam | 91 | 3 | 1 | 2 | 6 | 13 |
| (United States) 1932 Los Angeles | 43 | 0 | 3 | 3 | 6 | 20 |
| (Nazi Germany) 1936 Berlin | 121 | 0 | 2 | 3 | 5 | 23 |
| (United Kingdom) 1948 London | 162 | 5 | 7 | 8 | 20 | 10 |
| (Finland) 1952 Helsinki | 129 | 2 | 1 | 3 | 6 | 15 |
| (Australia) 1956 Melbourne | 31 | 1 | 2 | 1 | 4 | 20 |
| (Italy) 1960 Rome | 100 | 2 | 3 | 1 | 6 | 13 |
| (Japan) 1964 Tokyo | 60 | 2 | 1 | 3 | 6 | 18 |
| 1968 Mexico City | 64 | 1 | 4 | 3 | 8 | 22 |
| (West Germany) 1972 Munich | 126 | 1 | 0 | 0 | 1 | 25 |
| (Canada) 1976 Montreal | 66 | 1 | 0 | 2 | 3 | 24 |
| (Soviet Union) 1980 Moscow | 58 | 2 | 1 | 2 | 5 | 16 |
| (United States) 1984 Los Angeles | 60 | 0 | 3 | 3 | 6 | 27 |
| (South Korea) 1988 Seoul | 78 | 2 | 1 | 1 | 4 | 23 |
| (Spain) 1992 Barcelona | 110 | 1 | 1 | 4 | 6 | 30 |
| (United States) 1996 Atlanta | 119 | 4 | 1 | 1 | 6 | 19 |
| (Australia) 2000 Sydney | 97 | 2 | 3 | 1 | 6 | 30 |
| (Greece) 2004 Athens | 92 | 2 | 1 | 5 | 8 | 34 |
| (China) 2008 Beijing | 84 | 2 | 2 | 3 | 7 | 30 |
| (United Kingdom) 2012 London | 113 | 2 | 4 | 3 | 9 | 29 |
| (Brazil) 2016 Rio de Janeiro | 121 | 2 | 6 | 7 | 15 | 28 |
| (Japan) 2020 Tokyo | 108 | 3 | 4 | 4 | 11 | 25 |
| (France) 2024 Paris | 124 | 2 | 2 | 5 | 9 | 29 |
| (United States) 2028 Los Angeles | future event | | | | | |
| (Australia) 2032 Brisbane | future event | | | | | |
| Total (29/30) | 2,669 | 50 | 80 | 84 | 214 | 27 |

=== Medals by Winter Games ===
| Games | Athletes | Gold | Silver | Bronze | Total | Rank |
|---|---|---|---|---|---|---|
| (Switzerland) 1948 St. Moritz | 2 | 0 | 0 | 0 | 0 | – |
| (Norway) 1952 Oslo | 1 | 0 | 0 | 0 | 0 | – |
| (Italy) 1956 Cortina d'Ampezzo | did not participate | | | | | |
| (United States) 1960 Squaw Valley | 1 | 0 | 0 | 0 | 0 | – |
| (Austria) 1964 Innsbruck | 2 | 0 | 0 | 0 | 0 | – |
| (France) 1968 Grenoble | 3 | 0 | 0 | 0 | 0 | – |
| 1972–1984 | did not participate | | | | | |
| (Canada) 1988 Calgary | 1 | 0 | 0 | 0 | 0 | – |
| (France) 1992 Albertville | 6 | 0 | 0 | 0 | 0 | – |
| (Norway) 1994 Lillehammer | 4 | 0 | 0 | 0 | 0 | – |
| (Japan) 1998 Nagano | 12 | 0 | 1 | 0 | 1 | 18 |
| (United States) 2002 Salt Lake City | 11 | 0 | 0 | 0 | 0 | – |
| (Italy) 2006 Turin | 5 | 0 | 0 | 0 | 0 | – |
| (Canada) 2010 Vancouver | 18 | 0 | 0 | 0 | 0 | – |
| (Russia) 2014 Sochi | 12 | 0 | 0 | 0 | 0 | – |
| (South Korea) 2018 Pyeongchang | 17 | 0 | 0 | 0 | 0 | – |
| (China) 2022 Beijing | 62 | 0 | 0 | 0 | 0 | – |
| (Italy) 2026 Milano Cortina | 39 | 0 | 1 | 0 | 1 | 25 |
| (France) 2030 French Alps | future event | | | | | |
| (United States) 2034 Utah | future event | | | | | |
| Total (16/25) | 196 | 0 | 2 | 0 | 2 | 46 |

=== Medals by summer sport ===
Leading in that sport

| Sport | Gold | Silver | Bronze | Total |
|---|---|---|---|---|
| Sailing | 13 | 10 | 9 | 32 |
| Cycling | 8 | 11 | 11 | 30 |
| Rowing | 7 | 5 | 13 | 25 |
| Handball | 5 | 1 | 1 | 7 |
| Shooting | 3 | 11 | 5 | 19 |
| Canoeing | 3 | 6 | 8 | 17 |
| Swimming | 3 | 5 | 7 | 15 |
| Badminton | 3 | 3 | 4 | 10 |
| Boxing | 1 | 5 | 6 | 12 |
| Fencing | 1 | 2 | 3 | 6 |
| Gymnastics | 1 | 2 | 1 | 4 |
| Weightlifting | 1 | 2 | 0 | 3 |
| Diving | 1 | 0 | 1 | 2 |
| Equestrian | 0 | 5 | 2 | 7 |
| Athletics | 0 | 4 | 3 | 7 |
| Wrestling | 0 | 3 | 7 | 10 |
| Football | 0 | 3 | 1 | 4 |
| Field hockey | 0 | 1 | 0 | 1 |
| Tennis | 0 | 1 | 0 | 1 |
| Table tennis | 0 | 0 | 1 | 1 |
| Taekwondo | 0 | 0 | 1 | 1 |
| Totals (21 entries) | 50 | 80 | 84 | 214 |

=== Medals by winter sport ===
| Sport | Gold | Silver | Bronze | Total |
|---|---|---|---|---|
| Curling | 0 | 1 | 0 | 1 |
| Speed skating | 0 | 1 | 0 | 1 |
| Totals (2 entries) | 0 | 2 | 0 | 2 |

== List of medalists ==
=== Athletes with most medals ===
According to official data of the International Olympic Committee, this is a list of Danish athletes who have won two or more Olympic gold medals or three or more Olympic medals with at least one gold medal and one silver medal. Medals won in the 1906 Intercalated Games are not included. It includes top-three placings in 1896 and 1900, before medals were awarded for top-three placings.

| Athlete | Sport | Games | Gold medal | Silver medal | Bronze medal | Total |
|---|---|---|---|---|---|---|
| Paul Elvstrøm | Sailing | 1948, 1952, 1956, 1960 | 4 | 0 | 0 | 4 |
| Eskild Ebbesen | Rowing | 1996, 2000, 2004, 2008, 2012 | 3 | 0 | 2 | 5 |
| Lars Jørgen Madsen | Shooting | 1900, 1912, 1920 | 2 | 2 | 1 | 5 |
| Lasse Norman Hansen | Track cycling | 2012, 2016, 2020 | 2 | 1 | 2 | 5 |
| Henry Hansen | Cycling | 1928, 1932 | 2 | 1 | 0 | 3 |
| Mikkel Hansen | Handball | 2016, 2020, 2024 | 2 | 1 | 0 | 3 |
| Henrik Møllgaard | Handball | 2016, 2020, 2024 | 2 | 1 | 0 | 3 |
| Niklas Landin Jacobsen | Handball | 2016, 2020, 2024 | 2 | 1 | 0 | 3 |
| Jesper Bank | Sailing | 1988, 1992, 2000 | 2 | 0 | 1 | 3 |
| Thomas Ebert | Rowing | 2000, 2004, 2008 | 2 | 0 | 1 | 3 |
| Viktor Axelsen | Badminton | 2016, 2020, 2024 | 2 | 0 | 1 | 3 |
| Valdemar Bandolowski | Sailing | 1976, 1980 | 2 | 0 | 0 | 2 |
| Erik Hansen | Sailing | 1976, 1980 | 2 | 0 | 0 | 2 |
| Poul Richard Høj Jensen | Sailing | 1976, 1980 | 2 | 0 | 0 | 2 |
| Camilla Andersen | Handball | 1996, 2000 | 2 | 0 | 0 | 2 |
| Tina Bøttzau | Handball | 1996, 2000 | 2 | 0 | 0 | 2 |
| Anette Hoffman | Handball | 1996, 2000 | 2 | 0 | 0 | 2 |
| Tonje Kjærgaard | Handball | 1996, 2000 | 2 | 0 | 0 | 2 |
| Janne Kolling | Handball | 1996, 2000 | 2 | 0 | 0 | 2 |
| Lene Rantala | Handball | 1996, 2000 | 2 | 0 | 0 | 2 |
| Kristine Andersen | Handball | 1996, 2004 | 2 | 0 | 0 | 2 |
| Karen Brødsgaard | Handball | 2000, 2004 | 2 | 0 | 0 | 2 |
| Katrine Fruelund | Handball | 2000, 2004 | 2 | 0 | 0 | 2 |
| Lotte Kiærskou | Handball | 2000, 2004 | 2 | 0 | 0 | 2 |
| Karin Mortensen | Handball | 2000, 2004 | 2 | 0 | 0 | 2 |
| Rikke Schmidt | Handball | 2000, 2004 | 2 | 0 | 0 | 2 |
| Mette Vestergaard | Handball | 2000, 2004 | 2 | 0 | 0 | 2 |
| Anders Peter Nielsen | Shooting | 1900, 1920 | 1 | 3 | 0 | 4 |
| Karen Margrethe Harup | Swimming | 1948 | 1 | 2 | 0 | 3 |
| Niels Larsen | Shooting | 1912, 1920, 1924 | 1 | 1 | 3 | 5 |
| Viggo Jensen | Weightlifting , Shooting | 1896 | 1 | 1 | 1 | 3 |
| Willy Hansen | Track cycling | 1924, 1928 | 1 | 1 | 1 | 3 |
| Ole Berntsen | Sailing | 1948, 1956, 1964 | 1 | 1 | 1 | 3 |
| Niels Fredborg | Track cycling | 1968, 1972, 1976 | 1 | 1 | 1 | 3 |
| Michael Mørkøv | Track cycling | 2008, 2020, 2024 | 1 | 1 | 1 | 3 |
| Anne-Marie Rindom | Sailing | 2016, 2020, 2024 | 1 | 1 | 1 | 3 |

=== Medals by team ===
Denmark has been successful at the Olympics in team sports like football, handball and team gymnastics. In football Denmark has won four medals. Also team gymnastics has given Denmark four medals. In women's handball Denmark has won three gold medals.

=== Summer Olympics ===
All Danish medals are listed.

| Games | Medal | Name | Sport | Event |
|---|---|---|---|---|
| 1896 Athens | Gold | Viggo Jensen | Weightlifting | Men's two hand lift |
| 1896 Athens | Silver | Holger Nielsen | Shooting | Men's 30 m free pistol |
| 1896 Athens | Silver | Viggo Jensen | Weightlifting | Men's one hand lift |
| 1896 Athens | Bronze | Holger Nielsen | Fencing | Men's sabre |
| 1896 Athens | Bronze | Viggo Jensen | Shooting | Men's 300 m free rifle, three positions |
| 1896 Athens | Bronze | Holger Nielsen | Shooting | Men's 25 m rapid fire pistol |
| 1900 Paris | Gold | Lars Jørgen Madsen | Shooting | Men's 300 metre free rifle, standing |
| 1900 Paris | Silver | Anders Peter Nielsen | Shooting | Men's 300 metre free rifle, kneeling |
| 1900 Paris | Silver | Anders Peter Nielsen | Shooting | Men's 300 metre free rifle, prone |
| 1900 Paris | Silver | Anders Peter Nielsen | Shooting | Men's 300 metre free rifle, three positions |
| 1900 Paris | Bronze | Peder Lykkeberg | Swimming | Men's underwater swimming |
| 1900 Paris | Bronze | Ernst Schultz | Athletics | Men's 400 metres |
| 1900 Paris | Gold | Edgar Aabye; Eugen Schmidt; Charles Winckler (mixed team with Sweden) | Tug of war | |
| 1908 London | Silver | Denmark national football team (squad) | Football, men's team competition | |
| 1908 London | Silver | Ludvig Dam | Swimming | Men's 100 m backstroke |
| 1908 London | Bronze | Anders Andersen | Wrestling | Men's Greco-Roman middleweight |
| 1908 London | Bronze | Carl Jensen | Wrestling | Men's Greco-Roman light heavyweight |
| 1908 London | Bronze | Søren Marinus Jensen | Wrestling | Men's Greco-Roman super heavyweight |
| 1912 Stockholm | Gold | Ejler Allert; Christian Hansen; Carl Møller; Carl Pedersen; Poul Hartmann | Rowing | Men's coxed fours, inriggers |
| 1912 Stockholm | Silver | Ivan Joseph Martin Osiier | Fencing | Men's Épée |
| 1912 Stockholm | Silver | Denmark national football team (squad) | Football, men's team competition | |
| 1912 Stockholm | Silver | Danish gymnastics team | Gymnastics | Men's team (Swedish system) |
| 1912 Stockholm | Silver | Steen Herschend; Sven Thomsen; Hans Meulengracht-Madsen | Sailing | Men's 6m class |
| 1912 Stockholm | Silver | Lars Madsen | Shooting | Men's 300m free rifle, three positions |
| 1912 Stockholm | Silver | Sofie Castenschiold | Tennis | Women's singles indoor |
| 1912 Stockholm | Bronze | Danish gymnastics team | Gymnastics | Men's team, free system |
| 1912 Stockholm | Bronze | Erik Bisgaard; Rasmus Frandsen; Mikael Simonsen; Poul Thymann; Ejgil Clemmensen | Rowing | Men's coxed fours |
| 1912 Stockholm | Bronze | Niels Larsen | Shooting | Men's 300m free rifle, three positions |
| 1912 Stockholm | Bronze | Ole Olsen; Lars Madsen; Niels Larsen; Niels Andersen; Laurits Larsen; Jens Hajslund | Shooting | Men's team free rifle |
| 1912 Stockholm | Bronze | Søren Marinus Jensen | Wrestling | Greco-Roman heavyweight |
| 1920 Antwerp | Gold | Stefanie Clausen | Diving | Women's 10m Platform |
| 1920 Antwerp | Gold | Danish gymnastics team | Gymnastics | Men's team (free system) |
| 1920 Antwerp | Gold | Lars Madsen; Niels Larsen; Anders Petersen; Erik Sætter-Lassen; Anders Peter Nielsen | Shooting | Men's team 300m military rifle, standing |
| 1920 Antwerp | Silver | Henry Petersen | Athletics | Pole vault |
| 1920 Antwerp | Silver | Søren Petersen | Boxing | Heavyweight |
| 1920 Antwerp | Silver | Anders Petersen | Boxing | Flyweight |
| 1920 Antwerp | Silver | Gotfred Johansen | Boxing | Lightweight |
| 1920 Antwerp | Silver | Danish gymnastics team | Gymnastics | Men's team (Swedish system) |
| 1920 Antwerp | Silver | Danish field hockey team | Field Hockey, men's team competition | |
| 1920 Antwerp | Silver | Niels Larsen | Shooting | Men's 300m free rifle, 3 positions |
| 1920 Antwerp | Silver | Lars Madsen | Shooting | Men's 300m military rifle, standing |
| 1920 Antwerp | Silver | Poul Hansen | Wrestling | Greco-Roman heavyweight |
| 1920 Antwerp | Bronze | Johannes Eriksen | Wrestling | Greco-Roman light heavyweight |
| 1924 Paris | Gold | Hans Jacob Nielsen | Boxing | Men's lightweight |
| 1924 Paris | Gold | Ellen Osiier | Fencing | Women's foil |
| 1924 Paris | Silver | Thyge Petersen | Boxing | Men's light heavyweight |
| 1924 Paris | Silver | Søren Petersen | Boxing | Men's heavyweight |
| 1924 Paris | Silver | Edmund Hansen; Willy Hansen | Cycling | Men's tandem |
| 1924 Paris | Silver | Frode Kirkebjerg | Equestrian | Individual eventing |
| 1924 Paris | Silver | Knud Degn, Christian Nielsen; Vilhelm Vett | Sailing | 6 m Class |
| 1924 Paris | Bronze | Grete Heckscher | Fencing | Women's foil |
| 1924 Paris | Bronze | Niels Larsen | Shooting | Men's 600 m free rifle |
| 1928 Amsterdam | Gold | Henry Hansen | Cycling | Men's individual road race |
| 1928 Amsterdam | Gold | Henry Hansen; Orla Jørgensen; Leo Nielsen | Cycling | Men's team road race |
| 1928 Amsterdam | Gold | Willy Hansen | Cycling | Men's track time trial |
| 1928 Amsterdam | Silver | Aage Høy-Petersen; Sven Linck; Niels Otto Møller; Peter Schlütter; Vilhelm Vett | Sailing | 6 m class |
| 1928 Amsterdam | Bronze | Michael Michaelsen | Boxing | Men's heavyweight |
| 1928 Amsterdam | Bronze | Willy Hansen | Cycling | Men's sprint |
| 1932 Los Angeles | Silver | Henry Hansen; Leo Nielsen; Frode Sørensen | Cycling | Men's team road race |
| 1932 Los Angeles | Silver | Svend Olsen | Weightlifting | Men's Light Heavyweight |
| 1932 Los Angeles | Silver | Abraham Kurland | Wrestling | Men's Greco-Roman Lightweight |
| 1932 Los Angeles | Bronze | Peter Jørgensen | Boxing | Men's Light Heavyweight |
| 1932 Los Angeles | Bronze | Harald Christensen; Willy Gervin | Cycling | Men's 2000m Tandem |
| 1932 Los Angeles | Bronze | Else Jacobsen | Swimming | Women's 200m Breaststroke |
| 1936 Berlin | Silver | Ragnhild Hveger | Swimming | Women's 400m freestyle |
| 1936 Berlin | Silver | Harry Larsen; Richard Olsen | Rowing | Men's coxless pair |
| 1936 Berlin | Bronze | Gerhard Pedersen | Boxing | Men's welterweight |
| 1936 Berlin | Bronze | Hans Lunding | Equestrian | Three day event – Individual |
| 1936 Berlin | Bronze | Inge Sørensen | Swimming | Women's 200m breaststroke |
| 1948 London | Gold | Greta Andersen | Swimming | Women's 100 m freestyle |
| 1948 London | Gold | Karen Harup | Swimming | Women's 100 m backstroke |
| 1948 London | Gold | Carl-Ebbe Andersen; Tage Henriksen; Finn Pedersen | Rowing | Men's coxed pair |
| 1948 London | Gold | Karen Hoff | Canoeing | Women's K-1 500 m |
| 1948 London | Gold | Paul Elvstrøm | Sailing | Men's Firefly |
| 1948 London | Silver | Eva Riise; Greta Andersen; Fritze Carstensen; Karen Harup | Swimming | Women's 4 × 100 m freestyle relay |
| 1948 London | Silver | Karen Harup | Swimming | Women's 400 m freestyle |
| 1948 London | Silver | Aage Larsen; Ebbe Parsner | Rowing | Men's doubles sculls |
| 1948 London | Silver | Ib Storm Larsen; Helge Schrøder; Helge Halkjær; Aksel Hansen | Rowing | Men's coxless four |
| 1948 London | Silver | Johan Andersen | Canoeing | Men's K-1 1000 m |
| 1948 London | Silver | Ejvind Hansen; Jacob Jensen | Canoeing | Men's K-2 1000 m |
| 1948 London | Silver | Karen Lachmann | Fencing | Women's foil individual |
| 1948 London | Bronze | Lily Carlstedt | Athletics | Women's javelin throw |
| 1948 London | Bronze | Christian Hansen | Wrestling | Men's Greco-Roman welterweight |
| 1948 London | Bronze | Birte Christoffersen | Diving | Women's 10 m platform |
| 1948 London | Bronze | Axel Schandorff | Cycling | Men's Sprint |
| 1948 London | Bronze | Børge Nielsen; Jørgen Olsen; Harry Knudsen; Erik Larsen; Henry Larsen | Rowing | Men's coxed four |
| 1948 London | Bronze | Klaus Baess; Ole Berntsen; William Berntsen | Sailing | Men's Dragon |
| 1948 London | Bronze | Svend Wad | Boxing | Men's Lightweight |
| 1948 London | Bronze | Denmark national football team (squad) | Football, men's team competition | |
| 1952 Helsinki | Gold | Bent Rasch; Finn Haunstoft | Canoeing | Men's C-2 1000 m |
| 1952 Helsinki | Gold | Paul Elvstrøm | Sailing | Men's Finn |
| 1952 Helsinki | Silver | Lis Hartel | Equestrian | Dressage individual |
| 1952 Helsinki | Bronze | Jørgen Frantzen; Svend Pedersen; Poul Svendsen | Rowing | Men's coxed pair |
| 1952 Helsinki | Bronze | Karen Lachmann | Fencing | Women's foil individual |
| 1952 Helsinki | Bronze | Victor Jörgensen | Boxing | Men's Welterweight |
| 1956 Melbourne | Gold | Paul Elvstrøm | Sailing | Men's Finn Individual Competition |
| 1956 Melbourne | Silver | Lis Hartel | Equestrian | Dressage Individual |
| 1956 Melbourne | Silver | Ole Berntsen; Christian von Bülow; Cyril Andresen | Sailing | Men's Dragon Team Competition |
| 1956 Melbourne | Bronze | Tove Søby | Canoeing | Women's K1 500 metres Kayak Singles |
| 1960 Rome | Gold | Paul Elvstrøm | Sailing | men's Finn individual competition |
| 1960 Rome | Gold | Erik Hansen | Canoeing | men's K1 1,000 metres kayak singles |
| 1960 Rome | Silver | Hans Fogh; Ole Gunnar Petersen | Sailing | Flying Dutchman |
| 1960 Rome | Silver | William Berntsen; Steen Christensen; Søren Hancke | Sailing | 5.5 Metre |
| 1960 Rome | Silver | Denmark national football team (squad) | Football, men's team competition | |
| 1960 Rome | Bronze | Erik Hansen; Arne Høyer; Erling Jessen; Helmuth Nyborg | Canoeing | men's K1 4x500 metres kayak relay |
| 1964 Tokyo | Gold | Ole Berntsen; Christian von Bülow; Ole Poulsen | Sailing | Men's Dragon Class |
| 1964 Tokyo | Gold | John Hansen; Bjørn Hasløv; Erik Petersen; Kurt Helmudt | Rowing | Men's Coxless Fours |
| 1964 Tokyo | Silver | Kjell Rodian | Cycling | Men's Individual Road Race |
| 1964 Tokyo | Bronze | Henning Wind | Sailing | Men's Finn Class |
| 1964 Tokyo | Bronze | Preben Isaksson | Cycling | Men's 4.000m Individual Pursuit |
| 1964 Tokyo | Bronze | Peer Nielsen; John Sørensen | Canoeing | Men's C-2 1.000m |
| 1968 Mexico City | Gold | Gunnar Asmussen; Per Lyngemark; Reno Olsen; Mogens Jensen | Cycling | Men's team pursuit |
| 1968 Mexico City | Silver | Niels Fredborg | Cycling | Men's 1000 metre time trial |
| 1968 Mexico City | Silver | Mogens Jensen | Cycling | Men's individual pursuit |
| 1968 Mexico City | Silver | Leif Mortensen | Cycling | Men's individual road race |
| 1968 Mexico City | Silver | Aage Birch; Poul Richard Høj Jensen; Niels Markussen | Sailing | Men's Dragon class |
| 1968 Mexico City | Bronze | Erik Hansen | Canoeing | Men's K-1 1000 metres |
| 1968 Mexico City | Bronze | Peter Christiansen; Ib Larsen | Rowing | Men's coxless pair |
| 1968 Mexico City | Bronze | Harry Jørgensen; Jørn Krab; Preben Krab | Rowing | Men's coxed pair |
| 1972 Munich | Gold | Niels Fredborg | Cycling | Men's 1000 metres time trial |
| 1976 Montreal | Gold | Valdemar Bandolowski; Erik Hansen; Poul Richard Høj Jensen | Sailing | Men's Soling class |
| 1976 Montreal | Bronze | Niels Fredborg | Cycling | Men's 1000 metres time trial |
| 1976 Montreal | Bronze | Verner Blaudzun; Gert Frank; Jørgen Hansen; Jørn Lund | Cycling | Men's team time trial |
| 1980 Moscow | Gold | Hans Kjeld Rasmussen | Shooting | Men's Skeet |
| 1980 Moscow | Gold | Valdemar Bandolowski; Erik Hansen; Poul Richard Høj Jensen | Sailing | Men's Soling |
| 1980 Moscow | Silver | Peter Due; Per Kjærgaard | Sailing | Men's Tornado |
| 1980 Moscow | Bronze | Hans-Henrik Ørsted | Cycling | Men's 4.000 metres Individual Pursuit |
| 1980 Moscow | Bronze | Susanne Nielsson | Swimming | Women's 100 metres Breaststroke |
| 1984 Los Angeles | Silver | Henning Lynge Jakobsen | Canoeing | Men's C-1 500 metres |
| 1984 Los Angeles | Silver | Anne Grethe Jensen | Equestrian | individual dressage |
| 1984 Los Angeles | Silver | Ole Riber Rasmussen | Shooting | Men's Skeet |
| 1984 Los Angeles | Bronze | Henning Lynge Jakobsen | Canoeing | Men's C-1 1000 metres |
| 1984 Los Angeles | Bronze | Erik Christiansen; Michael Jessen; Lars Nielsen; Per Rasmussen | Rowing | Men's Coxless Four |
| 1984 Los Angeles | Bronze | Hanne Eriksen; Birgitte Hanel; Lotte Koefoed; Bodil Rasmussen; Jette Sørensen | Rowing | Women's Coxed Quadruple Sculls |
| 1988 Seoul | Gold | Dan Frost | Cycling | Men's Points Race |
| 1988 Seoul | Gold | Jørgen Bojsen-Møller; Christian Grønborg | Sailing | Men's Flying Dutchman Class |
| 1988 Seoul | Silver | Benny Nielsen | Swimming | Men's 200 metres Butterfly |
| 1988 Seoul | Bronze | Jesper Bank; Steen Secher; Jan Mathiasen | Sailing | Men's Soling Class |
| 1992 Barcelona | Gold | Jesper Bank; Steen Secher; Jesper Seier | Sailing | Men's Soling Class |
| 1992 Barcelona | Silver | Arne Nielsson; Christian Frederiksen | Canoeing | Men's C-2 1000 metres |
| 1992 Barcelona | Bronze | Thomas Stuer-Lauridsen | Badminton | Men's Singles |
| 1992 Barcelona | Bronze | Brian Nielsen | Boxing | Men's Super Heavyweight |
| 1992 Barcelona | Bronze | Jørgen Bojsen-Møller; Jens Bojsen-Møller | Sailing | Men's Flying Dutchman Class |
| 1992 Barcelona | Bronze | Ken Frost; Jimmi Madsen; Klaus Kynde Nielsen; Jan Petersen; Michael Sandstød | Cycling | Men's team pursuit |
| 1996 Atlanta | Gold | Poul-Erik Høyer Larsen | Badminton | Men's Singles Competition |
| 1996 Atlanta | Gold | Thomas Poulsen; Eskild Ebbesen; Victor Feddersen; Niels Henriksen | Rowing | Men's Lightweight Coxless Four |
| 1996 Atlanta | Gold | Kristine Roug | Sailing | Women's Europe Class |
| 1996 Atlanta | Gold | National handball team (squad) | Handball | Women's Team Competition |
| 1996 Atlanta | Silver | Rolf Sørensen | Cycling | Men's Individual Road Race |
| 1996 Atlanta | Bronze | Trine Hansen | Rowing | Women's Single Sculls |
| 2000 Sydney | Gold | National handball team (squad) | Handball | Women's competition |
| 2000 Sydney | Gold | Jesper Bank; Henrik Blakskjær; Thomas Jacobsen | Sailing | Men's Soling class |
| 2000 Sydney | Silver | Wilson Kipketer | Athletics | Men's 800m |
| 2000 Sydney | Silver | Camilla Martin | Badminton | Women's singles |
| 2000 Sydney | Silver | Torben Grimmel | Shooting | Men's 50m rifle prone |
| 2000 Sydney | Bronze | Eskild Ebbesen; Thomas Ebert; Victor Feddersen; Søren Madsen | Rowing | Men's lightweight coxless four |
| 2004 Athens | Gold | National handball team (squad) | Handball | Women's competition |
| 2004 Athens | Gold | Eskild Ebbesen; Thomas Ebert; Thor Kristensen; Stephan Mølvig | Rowing | Men's lightweight coxless four |
| 2004 Athens | Silver | Joachim B. Olsen | Athletics | Men's shot put |
| 2004 Athens | Bronze | Wilson Kipketer | Athletics | Men's 800m |
| 2004 Athens | Bronze | Jens Eriksen; Mette Schjoldager | Badminton | Mixed doubles |
| 2004 Athens | Bronze | Michael Maze; Finn Tugwell | Table tennis | Men's doubles |
| 2004 Athens | Bronze | Signe Livbjerg | Sailing | Women's Europe class |
| 2004 Athens | Bronze | Dorte Jensen; Helle Jespersen; Christina Otzen | Sailing | Women's yngling class |
| 2008 Beijing | Gold | Mads Andersen; Thomas Ebert; Eskild Ebbesen; Morten Jørgensen | Rowing | Men's lightweight coxless four |
| 2008 Beijing | Gold | Martin Kirketerp Ibsen; Jonas Warrer | Sailing | Men's 49er class |
| 2008 Beijing | Silver | Casper Jørgensen; Jens-Erik Madsen; Michael Mørkøv; Alex Nicki Rasmussen | Cycling (track) | Men's team pursuit |
| 2008 Beijing | Silver | Kim Wraae Knudsen; René Holten Poulsen | Canoeing | Men's K-2 1000 m |
| 2008 Beijing | Bronze | Andreas Helgstrand; Anne van Olst; Nathalie zu Sayn-Wittgenstein | Equestrian | Dressage team |
| 2008 Beijing | Bronze | Rasmus Quist; Mads Reinholdt Rasmussen | Rowing | Men's double sculls |
| 2008 Beijing | Bronze | Lotte Friis | Swimming | Women's 800 m freestyle |
| 2012 London | Gold | Rasmus Quist; Mads Rasmussen | Rowing | Men's lightweight double sculls |
| 2012 London | Gold | Lasse Norman Hansen | Cycling (track) | Men's omnium |
| 2012 London | Silver | Anders Golding | Shooting | Men's skeet |
| 2012 London | Silver | Fie Udby Erichsen | Rowing | Women's single sculls |
| 2012 London | Silver | Jonas Høgh-Christensen | Sailing | Men's Finn |
| 2012 London | Silver | Mathias Boe; Carsten Mogensen | Badminton | Men's doubles |
| 2012 London | Bronze | Kasper Winther Jørgensen; Morten Jørgensen; Jacob Barsøe; Eskild Ebbesen | Rowing | Men's lightweight coxless four |
| 2012 London | Bronze | Joachim Fischer; Christinna Pedersen | Badminton | Mixed doubles |
| 2012 London | Bronze | Peter Lang; Allan Nørregaard | Sailing | Men's 49er |
| 2016 Rio de Janeiro | Gold | National handball team (squad) | Handball | Men's competition |
| 2016 Rio de Janeiro | Gold | Pernille Blume | Swimming | Women's 50 m freestyle |
| 2016 Rio de Janeiro | Silver | Jakob Fuglsang | Cycling (road) | Men's road race |
| 2016 Rio de Janeiro | Silver | Jacob Barsøe; Kasper Winther Jørgensen; Morten Jørgensen; Jacob Larsen | Rowing | Men's lightweight four |
| 2016 Rio de Janeiro | Silver | Mark Madsen | Wrestling | Men's Greco-Roman 75 kg |
| 2016 Rio de Janeiro | Silver | Emma Åstrand Jørgensen | Canoeing | Women's K-1 500 m |
| 2016 Rio de Janeiro | Silver | Kamilla Rytter Juhl; Christinna Pedersen | Badminton | Women's doubles |
| 2016 Rio de Janeiro | Silver | Sara Slott Petersen | Athletics | Women's 400 m hurdles |
| 2016 Rio de Janeiro | Bronze | Anne Dsane Andersen; Lærke Rasmussen | Rowing | Women's coxless pair |
| 2016 Rio de Janeiro | Bronze | Casper Folsach; Lasse Norman Hansen; Niklas Larsen; Frederik Madsen; Rasmus Quaade | Cycling (track) | Men's team pursuit |
| 2016 Rio de Janeiro | Bronze | Lasse Norman Hansen | Cycling (track) | Men's omnium |
| 2016 Rio de Janeiro | Bronze | Mie Nielsen; Rikke Møller Pedersen; Jeanette Ottesen; Pernille Blume | Swimming | Women's 4 × 100 m medley relay |
| 2016 Rio de Janeiro | Bronze | Anne-Marie Rindom | Sailing | Laser Radial |
| 2016 Rio de Janeiro | Bronze | Jena Mai Hansen; Katja Salskov-Iversen | Sailing | Women's 49er FX |
| 2016 Rio de Janeiro | Bronze | Viktor Axelsen | Badminton | Men's singles |
| 2020 Tokyo | Gold | Anne-Marie Rindom | Sailing | Laser Radial |
| 2020 Tokyo | Gold | Viktor Axelsen | Badminton | Men's singles |
| 2020 Tokyo | Gold | Lasse Norman Hansen; Michael Mørkøv | Cycling | Men's madison |
| 2020 Tokyo | Silver | Jesper Hansen | Shooting | Men's skeet |
| 2020 Tokyo | Silver | Lasse Norman Hansen; Niklas Larsen; Frederik Rodenberg; Rasmus Pedersen | Cycling | Men's team pursuit |
| 2020 Tokyo | Silver | Amalie Dideriksen; Julie Leth | Cycling | Women's madison |
| 2020 Tokyo | Silver | National handball team (squad) | Handball | Men's competition |
| 2020 Tokyo | Bronze | Joachim Sutton; Frederic Vystavel | Rowing | Men's coxless pair |
| 2020 Tokyo | Bronze | Pernille Blume | Swimming | Women's 50 m freestyle |
| 2020 Tokyo | Bronze | Emma Aastrand Jørgensen | Canoeing | Women's K-1 200 metres |
| 2020 Tokyo | Bronze | Emma Aastrand Jørgensen | Canoeing | Women's K-1 500 metres |
| 2024 Paris | Gold | Viktor Axelsen | Badminton | Men's singles |
| 2024 Paris | Gold | Denmark men's national handball team: Lasse Andersson; Thomas Arnoldsen; Mathias Gidsel; Simon Hald; Mikkel Hansen; Emil Jakobsen; Lukas Jørgensen; Niclas Kirkeløkke; Magnus Landin; Niklas Landin; Rasmus Lauge; Hans Lindberg; Henrik Møllgaard; Emil Nielsen; Simon Pytlick; Magnus Saugstrup | Handball | Men's tournament |
| 2024 Paris | Silver | Cathrine Dufour; Nanna Skodborg Merrald; Daniel Bachmann Andersen | Equestrian | Team dressage |
| 2024 Paris | Silver | Anne-Marie Rindom | Sailing | ILCA 6 |
| 2024 Paris | Bronze | Turpal Bisultanov | Wrestling | Men's Greco-Roman 87 kg |
| 2024 Paris | Bronze | Edi Hrnic | Taekwondo | Men's 80 kg |
| 2024 Paris | Bronze | Denmark women's national handball team: Louise Burgaard; Helena Elver; Emma Friis; Anne Mette Hansen; Line Haugsted; Kathrine Heindahl; Mie Højlund; Rikke Iversen; Sarah Iversen; Kristina Jørgensen; Michala Møller; Trine Østergaard; Althea Reinhardt; Mette Tranborg; Sandra Toft | Handball | Women's tournament |
| 2024 Paris | Bronze | Emma Aastrand Jørgensen | Canoeing | Women's K-1 500 m |
| 2024 Paris | Bronze | Michael Mørkøv; Niklas Larsen | Cycling | Men's Madison |

=== Winter Olympics ===
Denmark has won two silver medals at the Winter Olympics.

| Games | Medal | Name | Sport | Event |
|---|---|---|---|---|
| 1998 Nagano | Silver | Helena Blach Lavrsen; Margit Pörtner; Dorthe Holm; Trine Qvist; Jane Bidstrup | Curling | Women's competition |
| 2026 Milano Cortina | Silver | Viktor Hald Thorup | Speed Skating | Men's Mass Start |

== Summary by summer sport ==
=== Non-participations ===
Denmark has participated in most summer sports, but they have yet to participate in: Artistic swimming, Baseball/Softball, Basketball, Cricket, Lacrosse, Rugby football (neither Rugby sevens or the discontinued discipline Rugby union), Sport climbing, Surfing, Volleyball and Water polo.

Denmark never participated in the following discontinued sports: Basque pelota, Croquet, Jeu de paume, Karate, Polo, Rackets, Roque and Water motorsports.

=== Aquatics ===
For aquatics disciplines, follow these links: Diving and Swimming.

Denmark has yet to participate in Artistic swimming and Water polo.

=== Archery ===
Archery was included in the Olympic programme four times between 1900 and 1920. It returned in 1972 and has remained in the Olympic programme ever since.

Denmark's best placement in the sport was 8th by Arne Jacobsen in men's individual in 1972. That result was matched by Carina Christiansen, Maja Jager and Louise Laursen in women's team in 2012.

| Games | Archers | Events | Gold | Silver | Bronze | Total | Ranking |
|---|---|---|---|---|---|---|---|
| 1972 Munich | 4 | 2/2 | 0 | 0 | 0 | 0 | |
| 1976 Montreal | 1 | 1/2 | 0 | 0 | 0 | 0 | |
| 1988 Seoul | 3 | 2/4 | 0 | 0 | 0 | 0 | |
| 1992 Barcelona | 3 | 2/4 | 0 | 0 | 0 | 0 | |
| 2000 Sydney | 1 | 1/4 | 0 | 0 | 0 | 0 | |
| 2004 Athens | 1 | 1/4 | 0 | 0 | 0 | 0 | |
| 2008 Beijing | 2 | 2/4 | 0 | 0 | 0 | 0 | |
| 2012 London | 3 | 2/4 | 0 | 0 | 0 | 0 | |
| 2020 Tokyo | 1 | 1/5 | 0 | 0 | 0 | 0 | |
| Total | | | 0 | 0 | 0 | 0 | – |

=== Athletics ===
Athletics has been included in the Olympic programme since the inaugural 1896 Summer Olympics.

Denmark has won 7 medals in athletics; 4 silver and 3 bronze.

Their most successful athlete in the sport is Wilson Kipketer who competed in men's 800m, winning silver in 2000 and bronze in 2004.

Denmark's most successful female athlete in the sport is Sara Slott Petersen who won silver in women's 400m hurdles in 2016.

Denmark's remaining silver medalists are Henry Petersen who won his medal in men's pole vault in 1920 and Joachim Olsen who won his medal in men's shot put in 2004.

| Games | Athletes | Events | Gold | Silver | Bronze | Total | Ranking |
|---|---|---|---|---|---|---|---|
| 1896 Athens | 3 | 3/12 | 0 | 0 | 0 | 0 | |
| 1900 Paris | 4 | 6/23 | 0 | 0 | 1 | 1 | =10 |
| 1908 London | 8 | 9/26 | 0 | 0 | 0 | 0 | |
| 1912 Stockholm | 14 | 6/30 | 0 | 0 | 0 | 0 | |
| 1920 Antwerp | 18 | 15/29 | 0 | 1 | 0 | 1 | =10 |
| 1924 Paris | 9 | 12/27 | 0 | 0 | 0 | 0 | |
| 1928 Amsterdam | 10 | 11/27 | 0 | 0 | 0 | 0 | |
| 1932 Los Angeles | 2 | 2/29 | 0 | 0 | 0 | 0 | |
| 1936 Berlin | 10 | 11/29 | 0 | 0 | 0 | 0 | |
| 1948 London | 16 | 11/33 | 0 | 0 | 1 | 1 | =20 |
| 1952 Helsinki | 11 | 10/33 | 0 | 0 | 0 | 0 | |
| 1956 Melbourne | 2 | 4/33 | 0 | 0 | 0 | 0 | |
| 1960 Rome | 9 | 7/34 | 0 | 0 | 0 | 0 | |
| 1964 Tokyo | 4 | 5/36 | 0 | 0 | 0 | 0 | |
| 1968 Mexico City | 6 | 6/36 | 0 | 0 | 0 | 0 | |
| 1972 Munich | 13 | 11/38 | 0 | 0 | 0 | 0 | |
| 1976 Montreal | 3 | 3/37 | 0 | 0 | 0 | 0 | |
| 1980 Moscow | 2 | 2/38 | 0 | 0 | 0 | 0 | |
| 1984 Los Angeles | 3 | 2/41 | 0 | 0 | 0 | 0 | |
| 1988 Seoul | 5 | 5/42 | 0 | 0 | 0 | 0 | |
| 1992 Barcelona | 3 | 3/43 | 0 | 0 | 0 | 0 | |
| 1996 Atlanta | 7 | 7/44 | 0 | 0 | 0 | 0 | |
| 2000 Sydney | 4 | 4/46 | 0 | 1 | 0 | 1 | =32 |
| 2004 Athens | 5 | 5/46 | 0 | 1 | 1 | 2 | =28 |
| 2008 Beijing | 3 | 3/47 | 0 | 0 | 0 | 0 | |
| 2012 London | 6 | 6/47 | 0 | 0 | 0 | 0 | |
| 2016 Rio de Janeiro | 8 | 6/47 | 0 | 1 | 0 | 1 | =26 |
| 2020 Tokyo | 13 | 7/48 | 0 | 0 | 0 | 0 | |
| Total | | | 0 | 4 | 3 | 7 | 77 |

=== Badminton ===
Badminton has been included in the Olympic programme since 1992. Denmark has participated in every event held in the sport.

Denmark has been quite successful in the sport, winning 2 gold, 3 silver and 4 bronze medals.

Viktor Axelsen won gold in men's singles in 2020 and bronze in the same event in 2016.

Poul-Erik Høyer Larsen won gold in men's singles in 1996.

Denmark's most successful female athlete is Christinna Pedersen who won silver in women's doubles in 2016 together with Kamilla Rytter Juhl, and won bronze in mixed doubles in 2012 together with Joachim Fischer Nielsen.

| Games | Players | Events | Gold | Silver | Bronze | Total | Ranking |
|---|---|---|---|---|---|---|---|
| 1992 Barcelona | 12 | 4/4 | 0 | 0 | 1 | 1 | =4 |
| 1996 Atlanta | 16 | 5/5 | 1 | 0 | 0 | 1 | 4 |
| 2000 Sydney | 18 | 5/5 | 0 | 1 | 0 | 1 | 4 |
| 2004 Athens | 12 | 5/5 | 0 | 0 | 1 | 1 | 6 |
| 2008 Beijing | 10 | 5/5 | 0 | 0 | 0 | 0 | |
| 2012 London | 9 | 5/5 | 0 | 1 | 1 | 2 | 2 |
| 2016 Rio de Janeiro | 8 | 5/5 | 0 | 1 | 1 | 2 | 6 |
| 2020 Tokyo | 9 | 5/5 | 1 | 0 | 0 | 1 | 4 |
| Total | | | 2 | 3 | 4 | 9 | 4 |

=== Boxing ===
Boxing has been included in the Olympic programme since 1904 with the exception of 1912.

Denmark has won a total of 12 medals in the sport; 1 gold, 5 silver and 6 bronze.

Hans Jacob Nielsen won their only Olympic title in the sport by winning men's lightweight in 1924.

Søren Petersen is their only double medalist in the sport, winning silver in men's heavyweight in both 1920 and 1924.

Denmark has yet to participate in women's events in the sport.

| Games | Boxers | Events | Gold | Silver | Bronze | Total | Ranking |
|---|---|---|---|---|---|---|---|
| 1908 London | 2 | 1/5 | 0 | 0 | 0 | 0 | |
| 1920 Antwerp | 12 | 7/8 | 0 | 3 | 0 | 3 | 6 |
| 1924 Paris | 8 | 4/8 | 1 | 2 | 0 | 3 | 3 |
| 1928 Amsterdam | 6 | 6/8 | 0 | 0 | 1 | 1 | =11 |
| 1932 Los Angeles | 2 | 2/8 | 0 | 0 | 1 | 1 | =10 |
| 1936 Berlin | 8 | 8/8 | 0 | 0 | 1 | 1 | =11 |
| 1948 London | 6 | 6/8 | 0 | 0 | 1 | 1 | =10 |
| 1952 Helsinki | 5 | 5/10 | 0 | 0 | 1 | 1 | =14 |
| 1956 Melbourne | 3 | 3/10 | 0 | 0 | 0 | 0 | |
| 1960 Rome | 5 | 5/10 | 0 | 0 | 0 | 0 | |
| 1964 Tokyo | 4 | 4/10 | 0 | 0 | 0 | 0 | |
| 1968 Mexico City | 2 | 2/11 | 0 | 0 | 0 | 0 | |
| 1972 Munich | 3 | 3/11 | 0 | 0 | 0 | 0 | |
| 1976 Montreal | 3 | 3/11 | 0 | 0 | 0 | 0 | |
| 1980 Moscow | 3 | 3/11 | 0 | 0 | 0 | 0 | |
| 1988 Seoul | 5 | 5/12 | 0 | 0 | 0 | 0 | |
| 1992 Barcelona | 4 | 4/12 | 0 | 0 | 1 | 1 | =14 |
| 1996 Atlanta | 2 | 2/12 | 0 | 0 | 0 | 0 | |
| 2012 London | 1 | 1/13 | 0 | 0 | 0 | 0 | |
| Total | | | 1 | 5 | 6 | 12 | 31 |

=== Canoeing ===
==== Slalom ====
Canoe slalom was first included in the Olympic programme in 1972. It returned in 1992 and has remained in the programme since then.

Denmark has yet to participate in the discipline.

==== Sprint ====
Canoe sprint (including the discontinued discipline canoe marathon) has been included in the Olympic programme since 1936. Denmark has participated in the discipline every time it has been included in the programme.

Denmark has had some success in the discipline, winning 3 gold, 6 silver and 7 bronze medals.

Their most successful canoeist is Erik Hansen who won gold in men's K1 1000m in 1960 and bronze medals in men's K1x4 500m in 1960 (together with Arne Høyer, Erling Jessen and Helmuth Sørensen) and men's K1 1000m in 1968.

Denmark's remaining Olympic champions are Karen Hoff who won women's K1 500m in 1948 and Finn Haunstoft & Bent Peder Rasch who won men's C2 1000m in 1952.

The female Danish canoeist with most medals is Emma Jørgensen who won silver in women's K1 500m in 2016 and bronze in both K1 200m and K1 500m in 2020.

| Games | Canoeists | Events | Gold | Silver | Bronze | Total | Ranking |
|---|---|---|---|---|---|---|---|
| 1936 Berlin | 4 | 4/9 | 0 | 0 | 0 | 0 | |
| 1948 London | 7 | 5/9 | 1 | 2 | 0 | 3 | =3 |
| 1952 Helsinki | 9 | 6/9 | 1 | 0 | 0 | 1 | =5 |
| 1956 Melbourne | 7 | 5/9 | 0 | 0 | 1 | 1 | =7 |
| 1960 Rome | 9 | 6/7 | 1 | 0 | 1 | 2 | =4 |
| 1964 Tokyo | 7 | 5/7 | 0 | 0 | 1 | 1 | 9 |
| 1968 Mexico City | 5 | 2/7 | 0 | 0 | 1 | 1 | =6 |
| 1972 Munich | 6 | 4/7 | 0 | 0 | 0 | 0 | |
| 1976 Montreal | 1 | 1/11 | 0 | 0 | 0 | 0 | |
| 1980 Moscow | 1 | 1/11 | 0 | 0 | 0 | 0 | |
| 1984 Los Angeles | 1 | 2/12 | 0 | 1 | 1 | 2 | 8 |
| 1988 Seoul | 6 | 5/12 | 0 | 0 | 0 | 0 | |
| 1992 Barcelona | 6 | 6/12 | 0 | 1 | 0 | 1 | =14 |
| 1996 Atlanta | 4 | 4/12 | 0 | 0 | 0 | 0 | |
| 2000 Sydney | 3 | 3/12 | 0 | 0 | 0 | 0 | |
| 2004 Athens | 2 | 2/12 | 0 | 0 | 0 | 0 | |
| 2008 Beijing | 4 | 4/12 | 0 | 1 | 0 | 1 | =14 |
| 2012 London | 5 | 6/12 | 0 | 0 | 0 | 0 | |
| 2016 Rio de Janeiro | 5 | 5/12 | 0 | 1 | 0 | 1 | =13 |
| 2020 Tokyo | 4 | 4/12 | 0 | 0 | 2 | 2 | 19 |
| Total | | | 3 | 6 | 7 | 16 | 18 |

=== Cycling ===
==== BMX freestyle ====
BMX freestyle has been included in the Olympic programme since 2020. Denmark has yet to participate in the discipline.

==== BMX racing ====
BMX racing has been included in the Olympic programme since 2008.

Denmark's best placement in the sport was 6th by Simone Christensen in women's BMX racing in 2020.

Denmark's best placement in a men's event in the discipline was 19th by Morten Therkildsen in men's BMX in 2012. Henrik Baltzersen ranked similarly in the men's BMX in 2008, but cyclists eliminated in the heats weren't given an overall ranking then.

| Games | Cyclists | Events | Gold | Silver | Bronze | Total | Ranking |
|---|---|---|---|---|---|---|---|
| 2008 Beijing | 2 | 2/2 | 0 | 0 | 0 | 0 | |
| 2012 London | 1 | 1/2 | 0 | 0 | 0 | 0 | |
| 2016 Rio de Janeiro | 2 | 2/2 | 0 | 0 | 0 | 0 | |
| 2020 Tokyo | 1 | 1/2 | 0 | 0 | 0 | 0 | |
| Total | | | 0 | 0 | 0 | 0 | – |

==== Mountain biking ====
Mountain biking has been included in the Olympic programme since 1996.

Denmark's best placement in the sport was 7th by Lennie Kristensen in men's cross-country in 1996.

Denmark's best placement in a women's event in the discipline was 11th by Annika Langvad in women's cross-country in 2016.

| Games | Cyclists | Events | Gold | Silver | Bronze | Total | Ranking |
|---|---|---|---|---|---|---|---|
| 1996 Atlanta | 2 | 1/2 | 0 | 0 | 0 | 0 | |
| 2000 Sydney | 2 | 1/2 | 0 | 0 | 0 | 0 | |
| 2004 Athens | 3 | 2/2 | 0 | 0 | 0 | 0 | |
| 2008 Beijing | 2 | 1/2 | 0 | 0 | 0 | 0 | |
| 2016 Rio de Janeiro | 2 | 2/2 | 0 | 0 | 0 | 0 | |
| 2020 Tokyo | 3 | 2/2 | 0 | 0 | 0 | 0 | |
| Total | | | 0 | 0 | 0 | 0 | – |

==== Road cycling ====
Road cycling was included in the Olympic programme in 1896. It returned in 1912 and has remained in the Olympic programme ever since. Denmark has participated in the discipline every Games since 1912.

Denmark has won 2 gold, 5 silver and 1 bronze medal in the discipline.

Their most successful road cyclist was Henry Hansen who won gold in men's individual time trial and men's team time trial (together with Orla Jørgensen and Leo Nielsen) in 1928, and silver in men's team time trial in 1932 (together with Leo Nielsen again but also Frode Sørensen).

Leo Nielsen is the second most successful Danish cyclists in the discipline with his 1 gold and 1 silver mentioned above.

Denmark's best placement in a women's event in the discipline was 5th by Linda Villumsen in women's individual road race in 2008.

| Games | Cyclists | Events | Gold | Silver | Bronze | Total | Ranking |
|---|---|---|---|---|---|---|---|
| 1912 Stockholm | 8 | 2/2 | 0 | 0 | 0 | 0 | |
| 1920 Antwerp | 4 | 2/2 | 0 | 0 | 0 | 0 | |
| 1924 Paris | 2 | 1/2 | 0 | 0 | 0 | 0 | |
| 1928 Amsterdam | 4 | 2/2 | 2 | 0 | 0 | 2 | 1 |
| 1932 Los Angeles | 4 | 2/2 | 0 | 1 | 0 | 1 | 2 |
| 1936 Berlin | 4 | 2/2 | 0 | 0 | 0 | 0 | |
| 1948 London | 4 | 2/2 | 0 | 0 | 0 | 0 | |
| 1952 Helsinki | 4 | 2/2 | 0 | 0 | 0 | 0 | |
| 1956 Melbourne | 1 | 1/2 | 0 | 0 | 0 | 0 | |
| 1960 Rome | 4 | 1/2 | 0 | 0 | 0 | 0 | |
| 1964 Tokyo | 5 | 2/2 | 0 | 1 | 0 | 1 | 3 |
| 1968 Mexico City | 5 | 2/2 | 0 | 1 | 0 | 1 | 4 |
| 1972 Munich | 7 | 2/2 | 0 | 0 | 0 | 0 | |
| 1976 Montreal | 6 | 2/2 | 0 | 0 | 1 | 1 | 5 |
| 1980 Moscow | 8 | 2/2 | 0 | 0 | 0 | 0 | |
| 1984 Los Angeles | 7 | 3/3 | 0 | 0 | 0 | 0 | |
| 1988 Seoul | 3 | 2/3 | 0 | 0 | 0 | 0 | |
| 1992 Barcelona | 4 | 2/3 | 0 | 0 | 0 | 0 | |
| 1996 Atlanta | 5 | 2/4 | 0 | 1 | 0 | 1 | =5 |
| 2000 Sydney | 5 | 2/4 | 0 | 0 | 0 | 0 | |
| 2004 Athens | 5 | 2/4 | 0 | 0 | 0 | 0 | |
| 2008 Beijing | 4 | 4/4 | 0 | 0 | 0 | 0 | |
| 2012 London | 4 | 2/4 | 0 | 0 | 0 | 0 | |
| 2016 Rio de Janeiro | 3 | 2/4 | 0 | 1 | 0 | 1 | =5 |
| 2020 Tokyo | 6 | 4/4 | 0 | 0 | 0 | 0 | |
| Total | | | 2 | 5 | 1 | 8 | 12 |

==== Track cycling ====
Track cycling was included in the inaugural 1896 Summer Olympic programme and has been included in all Summer Games except for 1912.

Denmark has obtained 21 medals in the discipline, 6 gold, 6 silver and 9 bronze.

Their most successful track cyclist is Lasse Norman Hansen with 2 gold, 1 silver and 2 bronze medals. He won his Olympic titles in men's omnium in 2012 and men's Madison in 2020, the latter together with Michael Mørkøv.

Denmark has two more track cyclists with 3 medals. Willy Falck Hansen won 1 gold, 1 silver and 1 bronze. His Olympic title came in men's time trial in 1928. Niels Fredborg also won 1 gold, 1 silver and 1 bronze. His Olympic title came in men's time trial in 1972.

Denmark's most successful female track cyclists are Amalie Dideriksen and Julie Leth who won silver together in women's Madison in 2020.

| Games | Cyclists | Events | Gold | Silver | Bronze | Total | Ranking |
|---|---|---|---|---|---|---|---|
| 1920 Antwerp | 2 | 2/4 | 0 | 0 | 0 | 0 | |
| 1924 Paris | 4 | 4/4 | 0 | 1 | 0 | 1 | =5 |
| 1928 Amsterdam | 1 | 2/4 | 1 | 0 | 1 | 2 | 2 |
| 1932 Los Angeles | 2 | 3/4 | 0 | 0 | 1 | 1 | 6 |
| 1936 Berlin | 7 | 4/4 | 0 | 0 | 0 | 0 | |
| 1948 London | 7 | 4/4 | 0 | 0 | 1 | 1 | 5 |
| 1952 Helsinki | 9 | 4/4 | 0 | 0 | 0 | 0 | |
| 1956 Melbourne | 1 | 1/4 | 0 | 0 | 0 | 0 | |
| 1960 Rome | 4 | 1/4 | 0 | 0 | 0 | 0 | |
| 1964 Tokyo | 7 | 5/5 | 0 | 0 | 1 | 1 | =7 |
| 1968 Mexico City | 8 | 5/5 | 1 | 2 | 0 | 3 | 2 |
| 1972 Munich | 6 | 4/5 | 1 | 0 | 0 | 1 | =3 |
| 1976 Montreal | 5 | 3/4 | 0 | 0 | 1 | 1 | =8 |
| 1980 Moscow | 3 | 3/4 | 0 | 0 | 1 | 1 | =5 |
| 1984 Los Angeles | 6 | 4/5 | 0 | 0 | 0 | 0 | |
| 1988 Seoul | 6 | 4/6 | 1 | 0 | 0 | 1 | 3 |
| 1992 Barcelona | 7 | 4/7 | 0 | 0 | 1 | 1 | =9 |
| 1996 Atlanta | 5 | 2/8 | 0 | 0 | 0 | 0 | |
| 2000 Sydney | 2 | 2/12 | 0 | 0 | 0 | 0 | |
| 2008 Beijing | 7 | 4/10 | 0 | 1 | 0 | 1 | =7 |
| 2012 London | 5 | 2/10 | 1 | 0 | 0 | 1 | 4 |
| 2016 Rio de Janeiro | 6 | 3/10 | 0 | 0 | 2 | 2 | 10 |
| 2020 Tokyo | 7 | 5/12 | 1 | 2 | 0 | 3 | 3 |
| Total | | | 6 | 6 | 9 | 21 | 8 |

=== Diving ===
Diving has been included in the Olympic programme since 1904.

Denmark has won two medals in the sport, a gold and a bronze. Stefanie Clausen won gold in women's 10m platform in 1920. Birte Christoffersen won bronze in women's 10m platform in 1948.

Denmark's best placement in a men's event in the sport was 6th, a record shared between Herold Jansson in men's plain high diving in 1920 and Thomas Christiansen in men's 10m platform in 1948.

| Games | Divers | Events | Gold | Silver | Bronze | Total | Ranking |
|---|---|---|---|---|---|---|---|
| 1920 Antwerp | 5 | 3/5 | 1 | 0 | 0 | 1 | 3 |
| 1924 Paris | 4 | 3/5 | 0 | 0 | 0 | 0 | |
| 1928 Amsterdam | 1 | 1/4 | 0 | 0 | 0 | 0 | |
| 1932 Los Angeles | 1 | 2/4 | 0 | 0 | 0 | 0 | |
| 1936 Berlin | 2 | 1/4 | 0 | 0 | 0 | 0 | |
| 1948 London | 3 | 4/4 | 0 | 0 | 1 | 1 | =2 |
| 1952 Helsinki | 2 | 1/4 | 0 | 0 | 0 | 0 | |
| 1956 Melbourne | 1 | 1/4 | 0 | 0 | 0 | 0 | |
| 1960 Rome | 2 | 1/4 | 0 | 0 | 0 | 0 | |
| 1964 Tokyo | 2 | 2/4 | 0 | 0 | 0 | 0 | |
| 1980 Moscow | 1 | 1/4 | 0 | 0 | 0 | 0 | |
| Total | | | 1 | 0 | 1 | 2 | 15 |

=== Equestrian ===
==== Dressage ====
Dressage had one event included in 1900. It returned to the Olympic programme in 1912 and has remained in the Olympic programme ever since.

Denmark has won 4 medals in the sport; 3 silver and 1 bronze.

Lis Hartel won silver in the individual event both in 1952 and 1956. Anne Grethe Jensen also earned silver in the individual event, in 1984.

Their bronze medal was won by Andreas Helgstrand, Anne van Olst and Princess Nathalie of Sayn-Wittgenstein-Berleburg in the team event in 2008.

| Games | Riders | Events | Gold | Silver | Bronze | Total | Ranking |
|---|---|---|---|---|---|---|---|
| 1912 Stockholm | 2 | 1/1 | 0 | 0 | 0 | 0 | |
| 1928 Amsterdam | 1 | 1/2 | 0 | 0 | 0 | 0 | |
| 1936 Berlin | 1 | 1/2 | 0 | 0 | 0 | 0 | |
| 1952 Helsinki | 2 | 1/2 | 0 | 1 | 0 | 1 | =2 |
| 1956 Melbourne / Stockholm | 3 | 2/2 | 0 | 1 | 0 | 1 | 2 |
| 1972 Munich | 3 | 2/2 | 0 | 0 | 0 | 0 | |
| 1976 Montreal | 3 | 2/2 | 0 | 0 | 0 | 0 | |
| 1984 Los Angeles | 3 | 2/2 | 0 | 1 | 0 | 1 | 3 |
| 1988 Seoul | 4 | 2/2 | 0 | 0 | 0 | 0 | |
| 1992 Barcelona | 4 | 2/2 | 0 | 0 | 0 | 0 | |
| 1996 Atlanta | 2 | 1/2 | 0 | 0 | 0 | 0 | |
| 2000 Sydney | 4 | 2/2 | 0 | 0 | 0 | 0 | |
| 2004 Athens | 4 | 2/2 | 0 | 0 | 0 | 0 | |
| 2008 Beijing / Hongkong | 3 | 2/2 | 0 | 0 | 1 | 1 | 3 |
| 2012 London | 4 | 2/2 | 0 | 0 | 0 | 0 | |
| 2016 Rio de Janeiro | 4 | 2/2 | 0 | 0 | 0 | 0 | |
| 2020 Tokyo | 3 | 2/2 | 0 | 0 | 0 | 0 | |
| Total | | | 0 | 3 | 1 | 4 | 11 |

==== Eventing ====
Eventing has been included in the Olympic programme since 1912.

Denmark has won two medals in the discipline, a silver and a bronze. Frode Kirkebjerg won silver in individual eventing in 1924 and Hans Lunding won bronze in the same event in 1936.

Denmark has yet to send female riders to compete in the discipline.

| Games | Riders | Events | Gold | Silver | Bronze | Total | Ranking |
|---|---|---|---|---|---|---|---|
| 1912 Stockholm | 3 | 2/2 | 0 | 0 | 0 | 0 | |
| 1924 Paris | 1 | 1/2 | 0 | 1 | 0 | 1 | =2 |
| 1928 Amsterdam | 2 | 1/2 | 0 | 0 | 0 | 0 | |
| 1936 Berlin | 3 | 2/2 | 0 | 0 | 1 | 1 | =4 |
| 1948 London | 3 | 2/2 | 0 | 0 | 0 | 0 | |
| 1952 Helsinki | 3 | 2/2 | 0 | 0 | 0 | 0 | |
| 1956 Melbourne / Stockholm | 3 | 2/2 | 0 | 0 | 0 | 0 | |
| 1960 Rome | 4 | 2/2 | 0 | 0 | 0 | 0 | |
| 1992 Barcelona | 1 | 1/2 | 0 | 0 | 0 | 0 | |
| 1996 Atlanta | 1 | 1/2 | 0 | 0 | 0 | 0 | |
| 2000 Sydney | 1 | 1/2 | 0 | 0 | 0 | 0 | |
| 2008 Beijing / Hongkong | 1 | 1/2 | 0 | 0 | 0 | 0 | |
| 2020 Tokyo | 1 | 1/2 | 0 | 0 | 0 | 0 | |
| Total | | | 0 | 1 | 1 | 2 | =13 |

==== Show jumping ====
Show Jumping was included in the Olympic programme in 1900. It returned in 1912 and has remained in the Olympic programme ever since.

Denmark's best placement in the discipline was 8th by Merethe Jensen in the individual event in 1992.

Denmark's best placement by a male rider in the discipline was shared 10th by Thomas Velin in the individual event in both 2000 and 2004.

| Games | Riders | Events | Gold | Silver | Bronze | Total | Ranking |
|---|---|---|---|---|---|---|---|
| 1948 London | 3 | 2/2 | 0 | 0 | 0 | 0 | |
| 1992 Barcelona | 2 | 1/2 | 0 | 0 | 0 | 0 | |
| 2000 Sydney | 1 | 1/2 | 0 | 0 | 0 | 0 | |
| 2004 Athens | 1 | 1/2 | 0 | 0 | 0 | 0 | |
| 2020 Tokyo | 1 | 1/2 | 0 | 0 | 0 | 0 | |
| Total | | | 0 | 0 | 0 | 0 | – |

==== Discontinued disciplines ====
Equestrian driving was conducted during the 1900 Summer Olympics and equestrian vaulting during the 1920 Summer Olympics. Denmark did not participate in the disciplines.

=== Fencing ===
Fencing has been included in the Olympic programme since the inaugural 1896 Games.

Denmark has won six medals in the sport, 1 gold, 2 silver and 3 bronze.

Their Olympic gold was won by Ellen Osiier in women's foil in 1924. Grete Heckscher won bronze in the same event.

Karen Lachmann is the Danish fencer with most medals as she won silver in women's foil in 1948 and bronze in the same event in 1952.

Two Danish men have earned medals. Ivan Osiier won silver in men's épée in 1912 and Holger Nielsen won bronze in men's sabre in 1896.

| Games | Athletes | Events | Gold | Silver | Bronze | Total | Ranking |
|---|---|---|---|---|---|---|---|
| 1896 Athens | 1 | 1/3 | 0 | 0 | 1 | 1 | 3 |
| 1900 Paris | 1 | 1/7 | 0 | 0 | 0 | 0 | |
| 1908 London | 8 | 4/4 | 0 | 0 | 0 | 0 | |
| 1912 Stockholm | 6 | 5/5 | 0 | 1 | 0 | 1 | =5 |
| 1920 Antwerp | 8 | 6/6 | 0 | 0 | 0 | 0 | |
| 1924 Paris | 11 | 7/7 | 1 | 0 | 1 | 2 | =4 |
| 1928 Amsterdam | 10 | 6/7 | 0 | 0 | 0 | 0 | |
| 1932 Los Angeles | 7 | 7/7 | 0 | 0 | 0 | 0 | |
| 1936 Berlin | 9 | 7/7 | 0 | 0 | 0 | 0 | |
| 1948 London | 15 | 6/7 | 0 | 1 | 0 | 1 | =4 |
| 1952 Helsinki | 12 | 5/7 | 0 | 0 | 1 | 1 | 6 |
| 1956 Melbourne | 1 | 1/7 | 0 | 0 | 0 | 0 | |
| 1960 Rome | 1 | 1/8 | 0 | 0 | 0 | 0 | |
| 1972 Munich | 6 | 3/8 | 0 | 0 | 0 | 0 | |
| 1976 Montreal | 1 | 1/8 | 0 | 0 | 0 | 0 | |
| 1980 Moscow | 1 | 1/8 | 0 | 0 | 0 | 0 | |
| 1996 Atlanta | 1 | 1/10 | 0 | 0 | 0 | 0 | |
| Total | | | 1 | 2 | 3 | 6 | 21 |

=== Field hockey ===
Field hockey was first included in the Olympic programme in 1908. It returned in 1920 before becoming a permanent Olympic sport in 1928.

Denmark only medal so far is the silver Denmark men's national field hockey team won in 1920.

Denmark has yet to participate in women's events in the sport.

| Games | Players | Events | Gold | Silver | Bronze | Total | Ranking |
|---|---|---|---|---|---|---|---|
| 1920 Antwerp | 12 | 1/1 | 0 | 1 | 0 | 1 | 2 |
| 1928 Amsterdam | 13 | 1/1 | 0 | 0 | 0 | 0 | |
| 1936 Berlin | 16 | 1/1 | 0 | 0 | 0 | 0 | |
| 1948 London | 16 | 1/1 | 0 | 0 | 0 | 0 | |
| 1960 Rome | 12 | 1/1 | 0 | 0 | 0 | 0 | |
| Total | | | 0 | 1 | 0 | 1 | =14 |

=== Football ===
Football has been included in the Olympic programme since 1900 with the exception of 1932.¨

Denmark has won four medals so far, Denmark men's national football team won silver medals in 1908, 1912 and 1960 and a bronze medal in 1948.

Six Danish footballers won two silver medals, Charles Buchwald, Harald Hansen, Nils Middelboe, Oscar Nielsen, Sophus Nielsen and Vilhelm Wolfhagen were all part of the teams in both 1908 and 1912.

Denmark women's national football team's best placement is 8th in 1996.

| Games | Footballers | Events | Gold | Silver | Bronze | Total | Ranking |
|---|---|---|---|---|---|---|---|
| 1908 London | 13 | 1/1 | 0 | 1 | 0 | 1 | 2 |
| 1912 Stockholm | 15 | 1/1 | 0 | 1 | 0 | 1 | 2 |
| 1920 Antwerp | 11 | 1/1 | 0 | 0 | 0 | 0 | |
| 1948 London | 13 | 1/1 | 0 | 0 | 1 | 1 | 3 |
| 1952 Helsinki | 11 | 1/1 | 0 | 0 | 0 | 0 | |
| 1960 Rome | 12 | 1/1 | 0 | 1 | 0 | 1 | 2 |
| 1972 Munich | 16 | 1/1 | 0 | 0 | 0 | 0 | |
| 1992 Barcelona | 16 | 1/1 | 0 | 0 | 0 | 0 | |
| 1996 Atlanta | 15 | 1/2 | 0 | 0 | 0 | 0 | |
| 2016 Rio de Janeiro | 17 | 1/2 | 0 | 0 | 0 | 0 | |
| Total | | | 0 | 3 | 1 | 4 | 23 |

Denmark also won the gold medal in football at the 1906 Intercalated Games. IOC has retroactively decided to no longer recognize those games as official Olympic games.

=== Golf ===
Golf was included in the Olympic programme in 1900 and 1904. It returned in 2016 and has remained in the Olympic programme ever since.

Denmark's best placement in the sport was shared 5th by Emily Pedersen in women's individual in 2020.

Denmark's best placement in a men's event in the sport was shared 21st by Søren Kjeldsen in men's individual in 2016.

| Games | Players | Events | Gold | Silver | Bronze | Total | Ranking |
|---|---|---|---|---|---|---|---|
| 2016 Rio de Janeiro | 4 | 2/2 | 0 | 0 | 0 | 0 | |
| 2020 Tokyo | 4 | 2/2 | 0 | 0 | 0 | 0 | |
| Total | | | 0 | 0 | 0 | 0 | – |

=== Gymnastics ===
==== Artistic gymnastics ====
Artistic gymnastics has been included in the Summer Olympic programme since the inaugural 1896 Games.

Denmark has won four medals in the discipline. They won gold in gold in men's team free system in 1920, silver in men's team Swedish system in 1912 and 1920 and a bronze in men's team free system in 1912.

The only multi medalists were Steen Olsen who participated in the free system in both 1912 and 1920 (winning bronze and gold respectively) and Hans Pedersen who participated in the Swedish system in both 1912 and 1920, winning silver both times.

Their best placement in a women's event in the sport was shared 62nd by Else Trangbæk in women's balance beam in 1968.

| Games | Gymnasts | Events | Gold | Silver | Bronze | Total | Ranking |
|---|---|---|---|---|---|---|---|
| 1896 Athens | 1 | 1/8 | 0 | 0 | 0 | 0 | |
| 1908 London | 24 | 1/2 | 0 | 0 | 0 | 0 | |
| 1912 Stockholm | 49 | 3/4 | 0 | 1 | 1 | 2 | 4 |
| 1920 Antwerp | 45 | 2/4 | 1 | 1 | 0 | 2 | 2 |
| 1948 London | 8 | 8/9 | 0 | 0 | 0 | 0 | |
| 1952 Helsinki | 7 | 8/15 | 0 | 0 | 0 | 0 | |
| 1968 Mexico City | 3 | 12/14 | 0 | 0 | 0 | 0 | |
| 1972 Munich | 1 | 7/14 | 0 | 0 | 0 | 0 | |
| 1976 Montreal | 1 | 7/14 | 0 | 0 | 0 | 0 | |
| Total | | | 1 | 2 | 1 | 4 | =28 |

Denmark also won a silver medal in artistic gymnastics at the 1906 Intercalated Games. IOC has retroactively decided to no longer recognize those games as official Olympic games.

==== Rhythmic gymnastics ====
Rhythmic gymnastics has been included in the Olympic programme since 1984.

Denmark's best placement in the sport was 34th by Malene Franzen in women's rhythmic individual all-around in 1988.

No men's events are held in the discipline.

| Games | Gymnasts | Events | Gold | Silver | Bronze | Total | Ranking |
|---|---|---|---|---|---|---|---|
| 1988 Seoul | 1 | 1/1 | 0 | 0 | 0 | 0 | |
| Total | | | 0 | 0 | 0 | 0 | – |

==== Trampoline ====
Trampoline has been included in the Olympic programme since 2000.

Denmark's best placement in the discipline was 10th by Peter Jensen. He obtained that placement in men's trampoline in both 2008 and 2012.

Denmark has yet to participate in women's events in the discipline.

| Games | Gymnasts | Events | Gold | Silver | Bronze | Total | Ranking |
|---|---|---|---|---|---|---|---|
| 2004 Athens | 1 | 1/2 | 0 | 0 | 0 | 0 | |
| 2008 Beijing | 1 | 1/2 | 0 | 0 | 0 | 0 | |
| 2012 London | 1 | 1/2 | 0 | 0 | 0 | 0 | |
| Total | | | 0 | 0 | 0 | 0 | – |

=== Handball ===
Handball was included in the Olympic programme in 1936. It returned in 1972 and has remained in the Olympic programme ever since.

Denmark has won 5 medals in the sport, 4 gold and 1 silver. Denmark women's national handball team won gold in the women's events in 1996, 2000 and 2004. Denmark men's national handball team won gold in the men's event in 2016 and silver in 2020.

12 Danish handballers are double Olympic champions; Camilla Andersen, Tina Bøttzau, Anette Hoffmann, Tonje Kjærgaard, Janne Kolling and Lene Rantala won gold with the women's team in 1996 and 2000, while Karen Brødsgaard, Katrine Fruelund, Lotte Kiærskou, Karin Mortensen, Rikke Petersen-Schmidt and Mette Vestergaard won gold in 2000 and 2004.

Denmark's most successful male handballers are Henrik Toft Hansen, Mikkel Hansen, Niklas Landin, Mads Mensah Larsen, Henrik Møllgaard, Morten Olsen and Lasse Svan Hansen who won gold in 2016 and silver in 2020 with the men's team.

| Games | Handballers | Events | Gold | Silver | Bronze | Total | Ranking |
|---|---|---|---|---|---|---|---|
| 1972 Munich | 16 | 1/1 | 0 | 0 | 0 | 0 | |
| 1976 Montreal | 13 | 1/2 | 0 | 0 | 0 | 0 | |
| 1980 Moscow | 14 | 1/2 | 0 | 0 | 0 | 0 | |
| 1984 Los Angeles | 14 | 1/2 | 0 | 0 | 0 | 0 | |
| 1996 Atlanta | 15 | 1/2 | 1 | 0 | 0 | 1 | =1 |
| 2000 Sydney | 15 | 1/2 | 1 | 0 | 0 | 1 | =1 |
| 2004 Athens | 15 | 1/2 | 1 | 0 | 0 | 1 | =1 |
| 2008 Beijing | 14 | 1/2 | 0 | 0 | 0 | 0 | |
| 2012 London | 29 | 2/2 | 0 | 0 | 0 | 0 | |
| 2016 Rio de Janeiro | 14 | 1/2 | 1 | 0 | 0 | 1 | =1 |
| 2020 Tokyo | 15 | 1/2 | 0 | 1 | 0 | 1 | =2 |
| Total | | | 4 | 1 | 0 | 5 | 3 |

=== Judo ===
Judo has been included in the Olympic programme since 1964 with the exception of the 1968 Games.

Denmark's best placement in the sport was 11th by Tommy Mortensen in men's 65 kg in 1988.

Denmark's best placement in a women's event in the sport was shared 17th by Lærke Olsen in women's 63 kg in 2020.

| Games | Judoka | Events | Gold | Silver | Bronze | Total | Ranking |
|---|---|---|---|---|---|---|---|
| 1984 Los Angeles | 1 | 1/8 | 0 | 0 | 0 | 0 | |
| 1988 Seoul | 1 | 1/7 | 0 | 0 | 0 | 0 | |
| 2020 Tokyo | 1 | 1/15 | 0 | 0 | 0 | 0 | |
| Total | | | 0 | 0 | 0 | 0 | – |

=== Modern pentathlon ===
Modern pentathlon has been included in the Olympic programme since 1912.

Denmark's best placement in the sport was 5th by Marius Christensen in men's individual in 1920.

Denmark's best placement in a women's event in the sport was 19th by Pernille Svarre in women's individual in 2000.

| Games | Pentathletes | Events | Gold | Silver | Bronze | Total | Ranking |
|---|---|---|---|---|---|---|---|
| 1912 Stockholm | 4 | 1/1 | 0 | 0 | 0 | 0 | |
| 1920 Antwerp | 4 | 1/1 | 0 | 0 | 0 | 0 | |
| 1924 Paris | 3 | 1/1 | 0 | 0 | 0 | 0 | |
| 1928 Amsterdam | 2 | 1/1 | 0 | 0 | 0 | 0 | |
| 1960 Rome | 1 | 1/2 | 0 | 0 | 0 | 0 | |
| 1968 Mexico City | 1 | 1/2 | 0 | 0 | 0 | 0 | |
| 1972 Munich | 3 | 2/2 | 0 | 0 | 0 | 0 | |
| 1976 Montreal | 2 | 1/2 | 0 | 0 | 0 | 0 | |
| 1988 Seoul | 1 | 1/2 | 0 | 0 | 0 | 0 | |
| 2000 Sydney | 1 | 1/2 | 0 | 0 | 0 | 0 | |
| Total | | | 0 | 0 | 0 | 0 | – |

=== Rowing ===
Rowing has been included in the Olympic programme since 1900.

Denmark has won 7 gold, 5 silver and 13 bronze medals for a total medal count of 25 in the sport.

Denmark's most successful rower is Eskild Ebbesen who won three gold medals and two bronze medals in men's lightweight coxless four. He won his Olympic titles in 1996 (together with Victor Feddersen, Niels Henriksen and Thomas Poulsen), 2004 (together with Thomas Ebert, Stephan Mølvig and Thor Kristensen) and 2008 (together with Mads Andersen, Thomas Ebert and Morten Jørgensen).

Thomas Ebert who was present for two of those Olympic titles, and also won a bronze medal, is Denmark's second most successful rower.

Denmark's most successful female rower is Fie Udby Erichsen who won silver in women's single sculls in 2012.

| Games | Rowers | Events | Gold | Silver | Bronze | Total | Ranking |
|---|---|---|---|---|---|---|---|
| 1912 Stockholm | 15 | 3/4 | 1 | 0 | 1 | 2 | =2 |
| 1920 Antwerp | 1 | 1/5 | 0 | 0 | 0 | 0 | |
| 1928 Amsterdam | 10 | 2/7 | 0 | 0 | 0 | 0 | |
| 1936 Berlin | 16 | 5/7 | 0 | 1 | 0 | 1 | =6 |
| 1948 London | 25 | 6/7 | 1 | 2 | 1 | 4 | 3 |
| 1952 Helsinki | 25 | 6/7 | 0 | 0 | 1 | 1 | =11 |
| 1956 Melbourne | 7 | 3/7 | 0 | 0 | 0 | 0 | |
| 1960 Rome | 16 | 5/7 | 0 | 0 | 0 | 0 | |
| 1964 Tokyo | 14 | 4/7 | 1 | 0 | 0 | 1 | =4 |
| 1968 Mexico City | 10 | 4/7 | 0 | 0 | 2 | 2 | 10 |
| 1972 Munich | 12 | 4/7 | 0 | 0 | 0 | 0 | |
| 1976 Montreal | 7 | 2/14 | 0 | 0 | 0 | 0 | |
| 1980 Moscow | 7 | 3/14 | 0 | 0 | 0 | 0 | |
| 1984 Los Angeles | 10 | 3/14 | 0 | 0 | 2 | 2 | 13 |
| 1988 Seoul | 3 | 2/14 | 0 | 0 | 0 | 0 | |
| 1992 Barcelona | 13 | 2/14 | 0 | 0 | 0 | 0 | |
| 1996 Atlanta | 13 | 5/14 | 1 | 0 | 1 | 2 | =7 |
| 2000 Sydney | 10 | 3/14 | 0 | 0 | 1 | 1 | =16 |
| 2004 Athens | 12 | 4/14 | 1 | 0 | 0 | 1 | =7 |
| 2008 Beijing | 10 | 4/14 | 1 | 0 | 1 | 2 | =9 |
| 2012 London | 10 | 5/14 | 1 | 1 | 1 | 3 | 4 |
| 2016 Rio de Janeiro | 13 | 6/14 | 0 | 1 | 1 | 2 | =11 |
| 2020 Tokyo | 9 | 4/14 | 0 | 0 | 1 | 1 | =17 |
| Total | | | 7 | 5 | 13 | 25 | 14 |

=== Sailing ===
Sailing has been included in the Olympic programme since 1900 with the exception of 1904.

Denmark has been highly successful in the sport, winning 31 medals of which 13 are gold.

Their most successful athlete in the sport is Paul Elvstrøm who won four Olympic titles; Firefly in 1948 and Finn in 1952, 1956 and 1960.

Denmark also has four double Olympic champions. Valdemar Bandolowski, Erik Hansen and Poul Richard Høj Jensen won the Soling class together in 1976 and 1980.

Jesper Bank won the Soling class in 1992 with Steen Secher and Jesper Seier and again in 2000, then with Henrik Blakskjær and Thomas Jacobsen.

Their most successful female athlete in the sport is Anne-Marie Rindom who won gold in Laser Radial in 2020 after earning bronze in the same event in 2016.

| Games | No. Sailors | Events | Gold | Silver | Bronze | Total | Ranking |
|---|---|---|---|---|---|---|---|
| 1900 Paris | 0 | 0/13 | 0 | 0 | 0 | 0 | |
| 1908 London | 0 | 0/4 | 0 | 0 | 0 | 0 | |
| 1912 Stockholm | 3 | 1/4 | 0 | 1 | 0 | 1 | 5 |
| 1920 Antwerp | 0 | 0/14 | 0 | 0 | 0 | 0 | |
| 1924 Paris | 4 | 2/3 | 0 | 1 | 0 | 1 | 3 |
| 1928 Amsterdam | 5 | 2/3 | 0 | 1 | 0 | 1 | 4 |
| 1932 Los Angeles | 0 | 0/4 | 0 | 0 | 0 | 0 | |
| 1936 Berlin | 7 | 2/4 | 0 | 0 | 0 | 0 | |
| 1948 London | 13 | 4/5 | 1 | 0 | 1 | 2 | 2 |
| 1952 Helsinki | 7 | 3/5 | 1 | 0 | 0 | 1 | 3 |
| 1956 Melbourne | 4 | 2/5 | 1 | 1 | 0 | 2 | 2 |
| 1960 Rome | 9 | 4/5 | 1 | 2 | 0 | 3 | 1 |
| 1964 Tokyo | 9 | 4/5 | 1 | 0 | 1 | 2 | 2 |
| 1968 Mexico City | 11 | 5/5 | 0 | 1 | 0 | 1 | 5 |
| 1972 Munich | 11 | 5/6 | 0 | 0 | 0 | 0 | |
| 1976 Montreal | 10 | 5/6 | 1 | 0 | 0 | 1 | 4 |
| 1980 Moscow | 10 | 5/6 | 1 | 1 | 0 | 2 | 3 |
| 1984 Los Angeles | 8 | 4/7 | 0 | 0 | 0 | 0 | |
| 1988 Seoul | 14 | 7/8 | 1 | 0 | 1 | 2 | 4 |
| 1992 Barcelona | 16 | 9/10 | 1 | 0 | 1 | 2 | 5 |
| 1996 Atlanta | 11 | 7/10 | 1 | 0 | 0 | 1 | 4 |
| 2000 Sydney | 12 | 7/11 | 1 | 0 | 0 | 1 | 6 |
| 2004 Athens | 14 | 8/11 | 0 | 0 | 2 | 2 | 14 |
| 2008 Beijing | 6 | 5/11 | 1 | 0 | 0 | 1 | 6 |
| 2012 London | 13 | 8/10 | 0 | 1 | 1 | 2 | 8 |
| 2016 Rio de Janeiro | 11 | 8/10 | 0 | 0 | 2 | 2 | 12 |
| 2020 Tokyo | 8 | 5/10 | 1 | 0 | 0 | 1 | =5 |
| Total | | | 13 | 9 | 9 | 31 | 5 |

=== Shooting ===
Shooting was included in the inaugural 1896 Summer Olympic programme and has been included in all Summer Games except for 1904 and 1928. Denmark has participated in the sport every time except for 1932.

Denmark most successful shooter was Lars Jørgen Madsen who won 5 medals; 2 gold, 2 silver and 1 bronze. His Olympic titles came in standing military rifle in 1900 and in men's 300m team military rifle standing, the latter together with Niels Larsen, Anders Peter Nielsen, Anders Petersen and Erik Sætter-Lassen.

Anders Peter Nielsen mentioned above is Denmark's second most successful shooter, as he also won three silver medals on top of his gold.

Denmark's remaining Olympic champion in the sport is Kjeld Rasmussen who won gold in mixed skeet in 1980.

Denmark's best placement in a women's event in the sport is 6th by Anni Bissø in women's 50m rifle 3 positions in 2000.

| Games | Shooters | Events | Gold | Silver | Bronze | Total | Ranking |
|---|---|---|---|---|---|---|---|
| 1896 Athens | 3 | 5/5 | 0 | 1 | 2 | 3 | 3 |
| 1900 Paris | 5 | 5/9 | 1 | 3 | 0 | 4 | 3 |
| 1908 London | 10 | 3/15 | 0 | 0 | 0 | 0 | |
| 1912 Stockholm | 14 | 9/18 | 0 | 1 | 2 | 3 | 6 |
| 1920 Antwerp | 15 | 11/21 | 1 | 2 | 0 | 3 | 4 |
| 1924 Paris | 7 | 4/10 | 0 | 0 | 1 | 1 | =9 |
| 1936 Berlin | 6 | 3/3 | 0 | 0 | 0 | 0 | |
| 1948 London | 7 | 3/4 | 0 | 0 | 0 | 0 | |
| 1952 Helsinki | 5 | 5/7 | 0 | 0 | 0 | 0 | |
| 1956 Melbourne | 2 | 2/7 | 0 | 0 | 0 | 0 | |
| 1960 Rome | 4 | 4/6 | 0 | 0 | 0 | 0 | |
| 1964 Tokyo | 2 | 2/6 | 0 | 0 | 0 | 0 | |
| 1968 Mexico City | 6 | 4/7 | 0 | 0 | 0 | 0 | |
| 1972 Munich | 7 | 6/8 | 0 | 0 | 0 | 0 | |
| 1976 Montreal | 7 | 5/7 | 0 | 0 | 0 | 0 | |
| 1980 Moscow | 4 | 3/7 | 1 | 0 | 0 | 1 | =2 |
| 1984 Los Angeles | 3 | 4/11 | 0 | 1 | 0 | 1 | =8 |
| 1988 Seoul | 6 | 7/13 | 0 | 0 | 0 | 0 | |
| 1992 Barcelona | 7 | 4/13 | 0 | 0 | 0 | 0 | |
| 1996 Atlanta | 8 | 9/15 | 0 | 0 | 0 | 0 | |
| 2000 Sydney | 4 | 5/17 | 0 | 1 | 0 | 1 | =17 |
| 2004 Athens | 5 | 5/17 | 0 | 0 | 0 | 0 | |
| 2008 Beijing | 1 | 1/15 | 0 | 0 | 0 | 0 | |
| 2012 London | 5 | 4/15 | 0 | 1 | 0 | 1 | =14 |
| 2016 Rio de Janeiro | 3 | 4/15 | 0 | 0 | 0 | 0 | |
| 2020 Tokyo | 4 | 5/15 | 0 | 1 | 0 | 1 | =12 |
| Total | | | 3 | 11 | 5 | 19 | 25 |

=== Skateboarding ===
Skateboarding has been included in the Olympic programme since 2020.

Denmark's best placement in the sport was 19th by Rune Glifberg in men's park in 2020.

Denmark has yet to participate in women's events in the sport.

| Games | Skateboarders | Events | Gold | Silver | Bronze | Total | Ranking |
|---|---|---|---|---|---|---|---|
| 2020 Tokyo | 1 | 1/4 | 0 | 0 | 0 | 0 | |
| Total | | | 0 | 0 | 0 | 0 | – |

=== Swimming ===
==== Long course swimming ====
Long course swimming has been included in the Olympic programme since the inaugural 1896 Summer Olympics.

Denmark first competed in swimming in 1900. They have won 15 medals in all, 3 gold, 5 silver and 7 bronze.

Denmark's most successful swimmer is Karen Harup who won gold in women's 100m backstroke and silver in both women's 400m freestyle and women's 4 × 100 m freestyle relay (the latter together with Greta Andersen, Eva Arndt and Fritze Carstensen), all in 1948.

Aside from winning a silver medal in that relay, Greta Andersen also won gold in women's 100m freestyle in 1948.

Denmark's remaining gold medal was won by Pernille Blume in women's 50m freestyle in 2016. She also won bronze in the same event in 2020 and in women's 4 × 100 m medley relay in 2016 (together with Rikke Møller Pedersen, Mie Nielsen and Jeanette Ottesen).

The most successful male Danish swimmer were Ludvig Dam who won silver in men's 100m backstroke in 1908 and Benny Nielsen who won silver in men's 200m butterfly in 1988.

| Games | Swimmers | Events | Gold | Silver | Bronze | Total | Ranking |
|---|---|---|---|---|---|---|---|
| 1900 Paris | 1 | 1/7 | 0 | 0 | 1 | 1 | =7 |
| 1908 London | 5 | 5/6 | 0 | 1 | 0 | 1 | 6 |
| 1912 Stockholm | 1 | 2/9 | 0 | 0 | 0 | 0 | |
| 1924 Paris | 4 | 3/11 | 0 | 0 | 0 | 0 | |
| 1928 Amsterdam | 5 | 4/11 | 0 | 0 | 0 | 0 | |
| 1932 Los Angeles | 2 | 3/11 | 0 | 0 | 1 | 1 | =7 |
| 1936 Berlin | 18 | 11/11 | 0 | 1 | 1 | 2 | 6 |
| 1948 London | 6 | 5/11 | 2 | 2 | 0 | 4 | 2 |
| 1952 Helsinki | 9 | 6/11 | 0 | 0 | 0 | 0 | |
| 1956 Melbourne | 2 | 2/13 | 0 | 0 | 0 | 0 | |
| 1960 Rome | 4 | 2/15 | 0 | 0 | 0 | 0 | |
| 1964 Tokyo | 3 | 4/18 | 0 | 0 | 0 | 0 | |
| 1968 Mexico City | 3 | 7/29 | 0 | 0 | 0 | 0 | |
| 1972 Munich | 6 | 11/29 | 0 | 0 | 0 | 0 | |
| 1976 Montreal | 2 | 2/26 | 0 | 0 | 0 | 0 | |
| 1980 Moscow | 1 | 2/26 | 0 | 0 | 1 | 1 | =7 |
| 1984 Los Angeles | 3 | 6/29 | 0 | 0 | 0 | 0 | |
| 1988 Seoul | 15 | 24/31 | 0 | 1 | 0 | 1 | =14 |
| 1992 Barcelona | 8 | 18/31 | 0 | 0 | 0 | 0 | |
| 1996 Atlanta | 10 | 15/32 | 0 | 0 | 0 | 0 | |
| 2000 Sydney | 7 | 10/32 | 0 | 0 | 0 | 0 | |
| 2004 Athens | 6 | 14/32 | 0 | 0 | 0 | 0 | |
| 2008 Beijing | 9 | 17/32 | 0 | 0 | 1 | 1 | =19 |
| 2012 London | 10 | 16/32 | 0 | 0 | 0 | 0 | |
| 2016 Rio de Janeiro | 15 | 14/32 | 1 | 0 | 1 | 2 | =11 |
| 2020 Tokyo | 11 | 10/35 | 0 | 0 | 1 | 1 | =20 |
| Total | | | 3 | 5 | 7 | 15 | 20 |

==== Marathon swimming ====
Marathon swimming has been included in the Olympic programme since 2008. Denmark has yet to participate in the discipline.

=== Table tennis ===
Table tennis has been included in the Olympic programme since 1988.

Denmark has won one medal in the sport; Michael Maze and Finn Tugwell won bronze in men's doubles in 2004.

Denmark's best placement in a women's event in the sport was shared 33rd by Mie Skov in women's singles in 2012.

| Games | Players | Events | Gold | Silver | Bronze | Total | Ranking |
|---|---|---|---|---|---|---|---|
| 2000 Sydney | 2 | 1/4 | 0 | 0 | 0 | 0 | |
| 2004 Athens | 2 | 2/4 | 0 | 0 | 1 | 1 | 5 |
| 2008 Beijing | 1 | 1/4 | 0 | 0 | 0 | 0 | |
| 2012 London | 3 | 2/4 | 0 | 0 | 0 | 0 | |
| 2016 Rio de Janeiro | 1 | 1/4 | 0 | 0 | 0 | 0 | |
| 2020 Tokyo | 1 | 1/5 | 0 | 0 | 0 | 0 | |
| Total | | | 0 | 0 | 1 | 1 | 12 |

=== Taekwondo ===
Taekwondo has been included in the Olympic programme since 2000.

Denmark's best placement in the sport was 4th by Hanne Høegh Poulsen in women's 49 kg in 2000.

Denmark's best placement in a men's event in the sport was shared 9th by Jesper Roesen in men's 68 kg in 2004.

| Games | Practitioners | Events | Gold | Silver | Bronze | Total | Ranking |
|---|---|---|---|---|---|---|---|
| 2000 Sydney | 2 | 2/8 | 0 | 0 | 0 | 0 | |
| 2004 Athens | 2 | 2/8 | 0 | 0 | 0 | 0 | |
| Total | | | 0 | 0 | 0 | 0 | – |

=== Tennis ===
Tennis was originally included in the Olympic programme between 1896 and 1924. Tennis returned to the games in 1988 and has remained in the programme since then.

Denmark has won one medal in the sport; Sofie Castenschiold won silver in women's indoor singles in 1912.

Denmark's best placement by a male athlete in the sport is 4th, which Erik Tegner accomplished together with Amory Hansen in mixed doubles in 1920.

| Games | Players | Events | Gold | Silver | Bronze | Total | Ranking |
|---|---|---|---|---|---|---|---|
| 1912 Stockholm | 10 | 5/8 | 0 | 1 | 0 | 1 | =6 |
| 1920 Antwerp | 3 | 4/5 | 0 | 0 | 0 | 0 | |
| 1924 Paris | 5 | 4/5 | 0 | 0 | 0 | 0 | |
| 1988 Seoul | 3 | 3/4 | 0 | 0 | 0 | 0 | |
| 1992 Barcelona | 2 | 2/4 | 0 | 0 | 0 | 0 | |
| 1996 Atlanta | 2 | 2/4 | 0 | 0 | 0 | 0 | |
| 2000 Sydney | 1 | 1/4 | 0 | 0 | 0 | 0 | |
| 2008 Beijing | 1 | 1/4 | 0 | 0 | 0 | 0 | |
| 2012 London | 1 | 1/5 | 0 | 0 | 0 | 0 | |
| 2016 Rio de Janeiro | 1 | 1/5 | 0 | 0 | 0 | 0 | |
| Total | | | 0 | 1 | 0 | 1 | =27 |

=== Triathlon ===
Triathlon has been included in the Olympic programme since 2000.

Denmark's best placement in the sport was 7th by Rasmus Henning in men's individual in 2004.

Denmark's best placement in a women's event in the sport was 23rd by Line Jensen in women's individual in 2012.

| Games | Triathletes | Events | Gold | Silver | Bronze | Total | Ranking |
|---|---|---|---|---|---|---|---|
| 2000 Sydney | 2 | 2/2 | 0 | 0 | 0 | 0 | |
| 2004 Athens | 1 | 1/2 | 0 | 0 | 0 | 0 | |
| 2008 Beijing | 1 | 1/2 | 0 | 0 | 0 | 0 | |
| 2012 London | 2 | 1/2 | 0 | 0 | 0 | 0 | |
| 2016 Rio de Janeiro | 1 | 1/2 | 0 | 0 | 0 | 0 | |
| Total | | | 0 | 0 | 0 | 0 | – |

=== Tug of war ===
Tug of war was included in the Olympic programme between 1900 and 1920.

Denmark never participated as a separate team, but in 1900, three Danish and three Swedish athletes teamed up and won the gold medal as a mixed team.

The three Danish Olympic champions in tug of war were Edgar Aabye, Eugen Schmidt and Charles Winckler.

=== Weightlifting ===
Weightlifting was first included in the Olympic programme at the inaugural 1896 Summer Olympics. It was excluded from the 1900, 1908 and 1912 Games but have been included every other time.

Denmark has won three medals in the sport, 1 gold and 2 silver. They first competed in weightlifting at the inaugural 1896 Games, with one lifter competing. Viggo Jensen won gold in the men's two-hand lift (based on a style tie-breaker), but was injured in the attempt and placed second for silver in men's one-hand lift.

Denmark's remaining silver medal was won by Svend Olsen in men's 82.5 kg in 1932.

Denmark has yet to participate in women's events in the sport.

| Games | Lifters | Events | Gold | Silver | Bronze | Total | Ranking |
|---|---|---|---|---|---|---|---|
| 1896 Athens | 1 | 2/2 | 1 | 1 | 0 | 2 | =1 |
| 1920 Antwerp | 5 | 5/5 | 0 | 0 | 0 | 0 | |
| 1928 Amsterdam | 1 | 1/5 | 0 | 0 | 0 | 0 | |
| 1932 Los Angeles | 1 | 1/5 | 0 | 1 | 0 | 1 | 6 |
| 1948 London | 4 | 4/6 | 0 | 0 | 0 | 0 | |
| 1952 Helsinki | 3 | 3/7 | 0 | 0 | 0 | 0 | |
| 1972 Munich | 3 | 3/9 | 0 | 0 | 0 | 0 | |
| 1976 Montreal | 1 | 1/9 | 0 | 0 | 0 | 0 | |
| 1980 Moscow | 1 | 1/10 | 0 | 0 | 0 | 0 | |
| 1984 Los Angeles | 1 | 1/10 | 0 | 0 | 0 | 0 | |
| 1988 Seoul | 2 | 2/10 | 0 | 0 | 0 | 0 | |
| 1992 Barcelona | 2 | 2/10 | 0 | 0 | 0 | 0 | |
| Total | | | 1 | 2 | 0 | 3 | 37 |

=== Wrestling ===
Wrestling was included in the inaugural 1896 Summer Olympic programme and has been included in all Summer Games except for 1900.

Denmark has won 9 medals in the sport, 3 silver and 6 bronze.

Their silver medals were won by Poul Hansen in men's Greco-Roman heavyweight in 1920, Abraham Kurland in men's Greco-Roman lightweight in 1932 and Mark Madsen in men's Greco-Roman 75 kg in 2016.

The Danish wrestler with most Olympic medals is Søren Marinus Jensen who won 2 bronze medals, in men's Greco-Roman super heavyweight in 1908 and heavyweight in 1912.

Denmark has yet to participate in women's events in the sport.

| Games | Wrestlers | Events | Gold | Silver | Bronze | Total | Ranking |
|---|---|---|---|---|---|---|---|
| 1908 London | 10 | 4/9 | 0 | 0 | 3 | 3 | 9 |
| 1912 Stockholm | 9 | 5/5 | 0 | 0 | 1 | 1 | =5 |
| 1920 Antwerp | 10 | 5/10 | 0 | 1 | 1 | 2 | 5 |
| 1924 Paris | 11 | 10/13 | 0 | 0 | 0 | 0 | |
| 1928 Amsterdam | 7 | 8/13 | 0 | 0 | 0 | 0 | |
| 1932 Los Angeles | 3 | 5/14 | 0 | 1 | 0 | 1 | =8 |
| 1936 Berlin | 5 | 6/14 | 0 | 0 | 0 | 0 | |
| 1948 London | 5 | 5/16 | 0 | 0 | 1 | 1 | =11 |
| 1952 Helsinki | 5 | 5/16 | 0 | 0 | 0 | 0 | |
| 1960 Rome | 4 | 4/16 | 0 | 0 | 0 | 0 | |
| 1964 Tokyo | 3 | 3/16 | 0 | 0 | 0 | 0 | |
| 1968 Mexico City | 3 | 3/16 | 0 | 0 | 0 | 0 | |
| 1972 Munich | 3 | 3/20 | 0 | 0 | 0 | 0 | |
| 1980 Moscow | 2 | 2/20 | 0 | 0 | 0 | 0 | |
| 2004 Athens | 1 | 1/18 | 0 | 0 | 0 | 0 | |
| 2008 Beijing | 2 | 2/18 | 0 | 0 | 0 | 0 | |
| 2012 London | 2 | 2/18 | 0 | 0 | 0 | 0 | |
| 2016 Rio de Janeiro | 1 | 1/18 | 0 | 1 | 0 | 1 | =14 |
| 2020 Tokyo | 1 | 1/18 | 0 | 0 | 0 | 0 | |
| Total | | | 0 | 3 | 6 | 9 | 43 |

Denmark also won two gold medals, one silver medal and one bronze medal in wrestling at the 1906 Intercalated Games. IOC has retroactively decided to no longer recognize those games as official Olympic games.

== Summary by winter sport ==
=== Non-participations ===
Denmark has participated in most winter sports but has yet to participate in Luge, Nordic combined, Short track speed skating and Ski jumping and the temporary sport Ski Mountaineering.

(They also didn't participate in Military Patrol in 1924, which sometimes is counted separately from Biathlon.)

=== Alpine skiing ===
Alpine skiing has been included in the Olympic programme since 1936.

Denmark's best placement in the sport was 20th by Christian Borgnæs in men's giant slalom in 2026.

Denmark's best placement in a women's event in the sport was 28th by Tine Kongsholm in women's slalom in 1992.

| Games | Alpine skiers | Events | Gold | Silver | Bronze | Total | Ranking |
|---|---|---|---|---|---|---|---|
| 1992 Albertville | 2 | 4/10 | 0 | 0 | 0 | 0 | |
| 1994 Lillehammer | 1 | 1/10 | 0 | 0 | 0 | 0 | |
| 1998 Nagano | 3 | 6/10 | 0 | 0 | 0 | 0 | |
| 2010 Vancouver | 3 | 5/10 | 0 | 0 | 0 | 0 | |
| 2014 Sochi | 1 | 3/10 | 0 | 0 | 0 | 0 | |
| 2018 Pyeongchang | 2 | 5/11 | 0 | 0 | 0 | 0 | |
| 2022 Beijing | 1 | 1/11 | 0 | 0 | 0 | 0 | |
| 2026 Milano Cortina | 2 | 2/10 | 0 | 0 | 0 | 0 | |
| Total | | | 0 | 0 | 0 | 0 | – |

=== Biathlon ===
Biathlon events were conducted at the 1924 Winter Olympics under the designation Military patrol. Biathlon arrived as its own sport at the 1960 Winter Olympics.

Denmark's best placement in the sport was 16th by Anne de Besche in women's sprint in 2026.

Denmark's best placement in a men's event in the sport was 54th by Sondre Slettemark in men's pursuit in 2026.

| Games | Biathletes | Events | Gold | Silver | Bronze | Total | Ranking |
|---|---|---|---|---|---|---|---|
| 2010 Vancouver | 1 | 2/10 | 0 | 0 | 0 | 0 | |
| 2022 Beijing | 1 | 2/11 | 0 | 0 | 0 | 0 | |
| 2026 Milano Cortina | 3 | 7/11 | 0 | 0 | 0 | 0 | |
| Total | | | 0 | 0 | 0 | 0 | – |

=== Bobsleigh ===
Bobsleigh has been included in the Olympic programme since the inaugural 1924 Winter Olympics, with the exception of the 1960 Games.

Denmark's only placement in the sport so far is 9th, by Maja Voigt in women's monobob in 2026.

| Games | Bobsledders | Events | Gold | Silver | Bronze | Total | Ranking |
|---|---|---|---|---|---|---|---|
| 2026 Milano Cortina | 1 | 1/4 | 0 | 0 | 0 | 0 | |
| Total | | | 0 | 0 | 0 | 0 | – |

=== Cross-country skiing ===
Cross-country skiing has been was included in the Olympic programme since the inaugural 1924 Winter Olympics.

Denmark's best placement in the sport was 32nd by Kirsten Carlsen in women's 10 km in 1968.

Denmark's best placement in a men's event in the sport was 41st by Michael Binzer in both men's 15 km pursuit in 1998 and men's 50 km freestyle in 1998.

| Games | Skiers | Events | Gold | Silver | Bronze | Total | Ranking |
|---|---|---|---|---|---|---|---|
| 1964 Innsbruck | 1 | 2/7 | 0 | 0 | 0 | 0 | |
| 1968 Grenoble | 3 | 4/7 | 0 | 0 | 0 | 0 | |
| 1992 Albertville | 2 | 4/10 | 0 | 0 | 0 | 0 | |
| 1994 Lillehammer | 2 | 4/10 | 0 | 0 | 0 | 0 | |
| 1998 Nagano | 1 | 4/10 | 0 | 0 | 0 | 0 | |
| 2010 Vancouver | 1 | 3/12 | 0 | 0 | 0 | 0 | |
| 2014 Sochi | 1 | 4/12 | 0 | 0 | 0 | 0 | |
| 2018 Pyeongchang | 1 | 2/12 | 0 | 0 | 0 | 0 | |
| Total | | | 0 | 0 | 0 | 0 | – |

=== Curling ===
Curling was included in the Olympic programme during the inaugural 1924 Winter Olympics. It didn't return until 1998, but has remained in the Games since then.

Jane Bidstrup, Helena Blach Lavrsen, Dorthe Holm, Margit Pörtner and Trine Qvist won silver in the women's event in 1998, earning Denmark's first Winter Olympic medal ever.

Denmark's best placement in a men's event is 6th, which Johnny Frederiksen, Troels Harry, Mikkel Poulsen, Rasmus Stjerne and Lars Vilandt got in the men's event in 2014.

| Games | Curlers | Events | Gold | Silver | Bronze | Total | Ranking |
|---|---|---|---|---|---|---|---|
| 1998 Nagano | 5 | 1/2 | 0 | 1 | 0 | 1 | 3 |
| 2002 Salt Lake City | 10 | 2/2 | 0 | 0 | 0 | 0 | |
| 2006 Turin | 4 | 1/2 | 0 | 0 | 0 | 0 | |
| 2010 Vancouver | 9 | 2/2 | 0 | 0 | 0 | 0 | |
| 2014 Sochi | 8 | 2/2 | 0 | 0 | 0 | 0 | |
| 2018 Pyeongchang | 9 | 2/3 | 0 | 0 | 0 | 0 | |
| 2022 Beijing | 10 | 2/3 | 0 | 0 | 0 | 0 | |
| 2026 Milano Cortina | 5 | 1/3 | 0 | 0 | 0 | 0 | |
| Total | | | 0 | 1 | 0 | 1 | =9 |

=== Figure skating ===
Figure skating was first included in the Olympic programme in the 1908 and 1920 Summer Olympics. It was moved to the Winter Olympics with the inaugural 1924 Winter Olympics and has been included in every Winter Olympic Games.

Denmark's best placement in the sport was 9th by Michael Tyllesen in men's singles in 1998.

Denmark's best placement in a women's event in the sport was 15th by Anisette Torp-Lind in ladies' singles in 1992.

| Games | Figure skaters | Events | Gold | Silver | Bronze | Total | Ranking |
|---|---|---|---|---|---|---|---|
| 1948 St. Moritz | 1 | 1/3 | 0 | 0 | 0 | 0 | |
| 1952 Oslo | 1 | 1/3 | 0 | 0 | 0 | 0 | |
| 1988 Calgary | 1 | 1/4 | 0 | 0 | 0 | 0 | |
| 1992 Albertville | 2 | 2/4 | 0 | 0 | 0 | 0 | |
| 1994 Lillehammer | 1 | 1/4 | 0 | 0 | 0 | 0 | |
| 1998 Nagano | 1 | 1/4 | 0 | 0 | 0 | 0 | |
| Total | | | 0 | 0 | 0 | 0 | – |

=== Freestyle skiing ===
Freestyle skiing has been included in the Olympic programme since 1992.

Denmark's best placement in the sport is 13th by Anja Bolbjerg in women's moguls in 1998.

Denmark has yet to participate in men's events in the sport.

| Games | Skiers | Events | Gold | Silver | Bronze | Total | Ranking |
|---|---|---|---|---|---|---|---|
| 1998 Nagano | 1 | 1/4 | 0 | 0 | 0 | 0 | |
| 2002 Salt Lake City | 1 | 1/4 | 0 | 0 | 0 | 0 | |
| 2010 Vancouver | 1 | 1/6 | 0 | 0 | 0 | 0 | |
| 2018 Pyeongchang | 1 | 1/10 | 0 | 0 | 0 | 0 | |
| Total | | | 0 | 0 | 0 | 0 | – |

=== Ice hockey ===
Ice hockey was first included in the Olympic programme in the 1920 Summer Olympics. It was moved to the Winter Olympics with the inaugural 1924 Winter Olympics and has been included in every Winter Olympic Games.

Denmark men's and women's ice hockey teams have both competed.

Denmark men's national ice hockey team's best placement is 7th in 2022. Denmark women's national ice hockey team best placement is 10th in 2022.

| Games | Players | Events | Gold | Silver | Bronze | Total | Ranking |
|---|---|---|---|---|---|---|---|
| 2022 Beijing | 45 | 2/2 | 0 | 0 | 0 | 0 | |
| 2026 Milano Cortina | 25 | 1/2 | 0 | 0 | 0 | 0 | |
| Total | | | 0 | 0 | 0 | 0 | – |

=== Skeleton ===
Skeleton has been included in the Olympic programme in 1928, 1948 and from 2002 until today.

Denmark has three placements in the sport so far.

Rasmus Johansen finished 11th in the men's event in 2026.

Nanna Johansen finished 20th in the women's event in 2026.

Together, Rasmus Johansen and Nanna Johansen finished 12th in the mixed team event in 2026.

| Games | Bobsledders | Events | Gold | Silver | Bronze | Total | Ranking |
|---|---|---|---|---|---|---|---|
| 2026 Milano Cortina | 2 | 3/3 | 0 | 0 | 0 | 0 | |
| Total | | | 0 | 0 | 0 | 0 | – |

=== Snowboarding ===
Snowboarding has been included in the Olympic programme since 1998.

Denmark has competed in two snowboarding events. Mike Kildevæld finished 15th in men's giant slalom 1998. Julie Lundholdt finished 15th too, but in women's snowboard cross in 2010.

| Games | Snowboarders | Events | Gold | Silver | Bronze | Total | Ranking |
|---|---|---|---|---|---|---|---|
| 1998 Nagano | 1 | 1/4 | 0 | 0 | 0 | 0 | |
| 2010 Vancouver | 1 | 1/6 | 0 | 0 | 0 | 0 | |
| Total | | | 0 | 0 | 0 | 0 | – |

=== Speed skating ===
Speed skating has been included in the Olympic programme since the inaugural 1924 Winter Olympics.

Denmark's has won one medal in the sport; Viktor Hald Thorup won silver in men's mass start in 2026.

Denmark's best placement in a women's event in the sport was 14th by Cathrine Grage in women's 5000m in 2010.

| Games | Skaters | Events | Gold | Silver | Bronze | Total | Ranking |
|---|---|---|---|---|---|---|---|
| 1948 St. Moritz | 1 | 1/4 | 0 | 0 | 0 | 0 | |
| 1960 Squaw Valley | 1 | 3/8 | 0 | 0 | 0 | 0 | |
| 1964 Innsbruck | 1 | 3/8 | 0 | 0 | 0 | 0 | |
| 2010 Vancouver | 1 | 2/12 | 0 | 0 | 0 | 0 | |
| 2018 Pyeongchang | 3 | 2/14 | 0 | 0 | 0 | 0 | |
| 2022 Beijing | 2 | 2/14 | 0 | 0 | 0 | 0 | |
| 2026 Milano Cortina | 1 | 2/14 | 0 | 1 | 0 | 1 | =8 |
| Total | | | 0 | 1 | 0 | 0 | =22 |

== Medals at subsequently de-recognized competitions ==
Art competitions held at Summer Olympics between 1912 and 1948, and the 1906 Intercalated Games are no longer recognized as official Olympic medal competitions by the IOC.

Denmark won 5 silver and 4 bronze medals in art competitions, and 3 gold, 2 silver and 1 bronze medal at the Intercalated Games.

== See also ==
- List of flag bearers for Denmark at the Olympics
- Category:Olympic competitors for Denmark
- Denmark at the Paralympics
