= Rowing at the 1984 Summer Olympics – Women's quadruple sculls =

Women's quadruple sculls at the Games of the XXIII Olympiad
- Date: 30 July – 4 August 1984
- Competitors: 36 from 7 nations

Medalists
1st place, gold medalist(s)		Maricica Țăran; Anișoara Sorohan; Ioana Badea; Sofia Corban; Ecaterina Oancia	Romania
2nd place, silver medalist(s)		Anne Marden; Lisa Rohde; Joan Lind; Virginia Gilder; Kelly Rickon	United States
3rd place, bronze medalist(s)		Hanne Eriksen; Birgitte Hanel; Lotte Koefoed; Bodil Rasmussen; Jette Sørensen	Denmark

The women's quadruple sculls competition at the 1984 Summer Olympics took place at Lake Casitas, California, United States.

== Competition format ==
The competition consisted of two main rounds (heats and finals) as well as a repechage. The 7 boats were divided into two heats for the first round, with 4 boats in one heat and 3 in the other. The winner of each heat advanced directly to the "A" final (1st through 6th place). The remaining 5 boats were placed in the repechage. A single heat was held in the repechage. The top four boats in the repechage went to the "A" final. The remaining boat (5th place in the repechage) was eliminated at 7th place overall.

All races were over a 1000-metre course. The women's quadruple sculls used a coxswain beginning with the 1976 Montreal Games. This was the last time that a coxswain was used.

== Results ==
=== Heats ===
The heats were held on July 30, during calm winds on a warm day (27 °C). The winner of each advanced to the A final, with all others going to the repechage. No boats were eliminated in this round.

==== Heat 1 ====
The Romanian boat established a 2.5 second lead over the West Germans by the halfway mark and won easily. The French team moved past the Germans into second place over the second half, with the Canadians also (by only .02 seconds) overtaking West Germany.

Rank	Rowers	Coxswain	Nation	Time	Notes
1	Ioana Badea; Sofia Corban; Anișoara Sorohan; Maricica Țăran	Ecaterina Oancia	Romania	3:15.34	Q
2	Lydie Dubedat-Briero; Christine Gossé; Évelyne Imbert; Hélène Ledoux	Patricia Couturier	France	3:18.88	R
3	Vicki Harber; Janice Mason; Lisa Roy; Dolores Young	Carolyn Trono	Canada	3:19.83	R
4	Anne Dickmann; Regina Kleine-Kuhlmann; Ute Kumitz; Sabine Reuter	Kathrien Plückhahn	West Germany	3:19.85	R

==== Heat 2 ====
The second heat resulted in an extremely close finish. The American boat had a half-second lead over the Danes at the halfway mark, but the Danish team closed the distance over the last 500 metres. The final margin for the United States was .01 seconds, allowing them to skip the repechage and go straight to the final, while Denmark went to race in the repechage. Italy was not competitive in this race, finishing 8 seconds after the other two boats.

Rank	Rowers	Coxswain	Nation	Time	Notes
1	Virginia Gilder; Joan Lind; Anne Marden; Lisa Rohde	Kelly Rickon	United States	3:14.68	Q
2	Hanne Eriksen; Birgitte Hanel; Lotte Koefoed; Bodil Rasmussen	Jette Sørensen	Denmark	3:14.69	R
3	Alessandra Borio; Antonella Corazza; Raffaella Memo; Donata Minorati	Roberta Del Core	Italy	3:22.89	R

=== Repechage ===
The repechage was held on August 1. The winds were calm, though the day was cooler than during the heats (16 °C). Of the five boats in the repechage, all but one would advance to the final—only the last place boat would be eliminated (taking 7th place).

The West Germany boat started strong, holding nearly a full second lead at the halfway mark. Denmark, France, Italy, and Canada were roughly evenly spaced after that, with approximately half a second between each of those boats. Over the second half of the course, Denmark proved the best—passing West Germany to win by nearly 2 seconds. Canada was unable to gain ground on 4th-place Italy, and finished as the only boat not to reach the final.

Rank	Rowers	Coxswain	Nation	Time	Notes
1	Hanne Eriksen; Birgitte Hanel; Lotte Koefoed; Bodil Rasmussen	Jette Sørensen	Denmark	3:16.32	Q
2	Anne Dickmann; Regina Kleine-Kuhlmann; Ute Kumitz; Sabine Reuter	Kathrien Plückhahn	West Germany	3:18.21	Q
3	Lydie Dubedat-Briero; Christine Gossé; Évelyne Imbert; Hélène Ledoux	Patricia Couturier	France	3:19.01	Q
4	Alessandra Borio; Antonella Corazza; Raffaella Memo; Donata Minorati	Roberta Del Core	Italy	3:19.26	Q
5	Vicki Harber; Janice Mason; Lisa Roy; Dolores Young	Carolyn Trono	Canada	3:19.88	7th place overall

=== Final ===
Unlike most other rowing events, the women's quadruple sculls had only a single final (with 7 boats in the event, a "B" final would have consisted of only a single team). The final was held on August 4, a cool (18 °C) day with no wind. West Germany again started strong, taking a lead of 1.2 seconds by the halfway mark, before falling back. Romania ultimately won relatively comfortably, beating the silver medalists by a second and a half. The description of the battle for second place in Sports-Reference indicates a very close finish ("the United States and Denmark battled to the line for silver, with the former coming out ahead by another hair's breadth: 0.05 seconds"), though this is not supported by the official times, which have the Americans winning by 0.45 seconds—a close race, but not nearly so close as the two had in the heats.

The third through sixth place teams finished in the same order as they had in the repechage, with Denmark taking the bronze followed by West Germany, France, and Italy.

Rank	Rowers	Coxswain	Nation	Time
1st place, gold medalist(s)	Ioana Badea; Sofia Corban; Anișoara Sorohan; Maricica Țăran	Ecaterina Oancia	Romania	3:14.11
2nd place, silver medalist(s)	Virginia Gilder; Joan Lind; Anne Marden; Lisa Rohde	Kelly Rickon	United States	3:15.57
3rd place, bronze medalist(s)	Hanne Eriksen; Birgitte Hanel; Lotte Koefoed; Bodil Rasmussen	Jette Sørensen	Denmark	3:16.02
4	Anne Dickmann; Regina Kleine-Kuhlmann; Ute Kumitz; Sabine Reuter	Kathrien Plückhahn	West Germany	3:16.81
5	Lydie Dubedat-Briero; Christine Gossé; Évelyne Imbert; Hélène Ledoux	Patricia Couturier	France	3:17.87
6	Alessandra Borio; Antonella Corazza; Raffaella Memo; Donata Minorati	Roberta Del Core	Italy	3:21.48

== Final classification ==
Rank	Rowers	Country
1st place, gold medalist(s)	Maricica Țăran; Anișoara Sorohan; Ioana Badea; Sofia Corban; Ecaterina Oancia	Romania
2nd place, silver medalist(s)	Anne Marden; Lisa Rohde; Joan Lind; Virginia Gilder; Kelly Rickon	United States
3rd place, bronze medalist(s)	Hanne Eriksen; Birgitte Hanel; Lotte Koefoed; Bodil Rasmussen; Jette Sørensen	Denmark
4	Anne Dickmann; Regina Kleine-Kuhlmann; Ute Kumitz; Sabine Reuter; Kathrien Plückhahn	West Germany
5	Évelyne Imbert; Lydie Dubedat-Briero; Christine Gossé; Hélène Ledoux; Patricia Couturier	France
6	Raffaella Memo; Alessandra Borio; Donata Minorati; Antonella Corazza; Roberta Del Core; Paola Grizzetti	Italy
7	Lisa Roy; Janice Mason; Vicki Harber; Dolores Young; Carolyn Trono	Canada
