= Joan Lind =

American rower

Personal information
- Full name: Joan Louise Lind
- Born: September 26, 1952 Long Beach, California, United States
- Died: August 28, 2015 Long Beach, California, United States
- Height: 5 ft 9 in (175 cm)
- Weight: 149 lb (68 kg)

Sport
- Sport: Rower
Medal record
Women's rowing
Representing the United States
Olympic Games
Silver medal – second place	1976 Montreal	Single sculls
Silver medal – second place	1984 Los Angeles	Coxed quad sculls

Joan Louise Lind (later, Joan Van Blom; September 26, 1952 – August 28, 2015) was an American rower.

== Olympian ==
She competed for United States in the 1976 Summer Olympics, held in Montreal, Quebec, Canada, in the Single sculls event where she finished in the silver medal position. Lind qualified for the 1980 U.S. Olympic team but did not compete due to the U.S. Olympic Committee's boycott of the 1980 Summer Olympics in Moscow, Russia. She was one of 461 athletes to receive a Congressional Gold Medal many years later. She returned to the 1984 Summer Olympics in Los Angeles as part of the American quadruple sculls with Anne Marden, Lisa Rohde, Virginia Gilder and Kelly Rickon, where she picked up a second silver medal.

== Honors ==
Joan (Lind) Van Blom was declared a lifetime member of the Long Beach Rowing Association. She was a member of the Wilson High School Hall of Fame, the Long Beach State 49er Hall of Fame Century Club and the National Rowing Hall of Fame. Legislation was introduced to name a bridge in Long Beach, California in her honor.

== Personal ==
Joan Lind was married to John Van Blom, a sculler, who competed at the 1968, 1972, and 1976 Olympics. John also qualified for the 1980 Olympic rowing team and received a Congressional Medal.
