= Vicki Harber =

Canadian rower

Personal information
- Born: 28 July 1956 (age 69) Ottawa, Ontario, Canada

Sport
- Sport: Rowing

Vicki Harber (born 28 July 1956) is a Canadian rower. She competed in the women's quadruple sculls event at the 1984 Summer Olympics.
