= Maricica Țăran =

Romanian-German rower

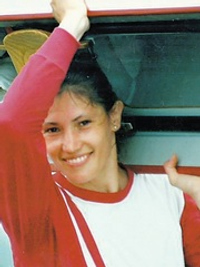

Personal information
- Born: 4 January 1962 (age 64) Gherța Mică, Romania
- Height: 179 cm (5 ft 10 in)
- Weight: 77 kg (170 lb)

Sport
- Sport: Rowing
Medal record
Representing Romania
Olympic Games
Gold medal – first place	1984 Los Angeles	Quadruple sculls
World Rowing Championships
Bronze medal – third place	1985 Hazewinkel	Quadruple sculls
Silver medal – second place	1986 Nottingham	Quadruple sculls
Representing West Germany
World Rowing Championships
Bronze medal – third place	1990 Tasmania	Single sculls

Maricia Titie Ţăran (later Iordache; born 4 January 1962) is a retired Romanian-German rower. Competing for Romania in quadruple sculls she won a gold medal at the 1984 Olympics, followed by two medals at the 1985 and 1986 world championships. After a regatta in Mannheim in 1987, she defected to West Germany, where she competed in single sculls and won a bronze medal at the 1990 World Championships.
