= Anne Dickmann =

German rower

Personal information
- Nationality: German
- Born: 12 February 1958 (age 67); Düsseldorf, Germany

Sport
- Sport: Rowing

Anne Dickmann (born 12 February 1958) is a German rower. She competed in the women's quadruple sculls event at the 1984 Summer Olympics.
