= Évelyne Imbert =

French rower

Personal information
- Nationality: French
- Born: 17 August 1958 (age 66)

Sport
- Sport: Rowing

Évelyne Imbert (born 17 August 1958) is a French rower. She competed in the women's quadruple sculls event at the 1984 Summer Olympics.
