= Ute Kumitz =

German rower

Personal information
- Nationality: German
- Born: 26 February 1960 (age 66) Hanover, Germany

Sport
- Sport: Rowing

Ute Kumitz (born 26 February 1960) is a German rower. She competed in the women's quadruple sculls event at the 1984 Summer Olympics.
