= Mara Đorđević =

Serbian singer

Mara Đorđević (born Marija Mišović; 31 January 1916 in Odobești, Romania – 22 January 2003 in Pančevo) was a Serbian singer of traditional songs.
