= Janice Mason =

Canadian rower

Personal information
- Born: 23 November 1959 (age 65) Edmonton, Alberta, Canada

Sport
- Sport: Rowing

Janice Mason (born 23 November 1959) is a Canadian former rower. She competed in the women's quadruple sculls event at the 1984 Summer Olympics.
