= Sabine Reuter =

German rower

Personal information
- Nationality: German
- Born: 15 August 1956 (age 68); Bremen, Germany

Sport
- Sport: Rowing

Sabine Reuter (born 15 August 1956) is a distinguished German rower. Her participations include competing in the women's quadruple sculls event at the 1984 Summer Olympics.
