= Kathrien Plückhahn =

German rowing cox

Personal information
- Nationality: German
- Born: 14 September 1958 (age 66); Berlin, Germany

Sport
- Sport: Rowing

Kathrien Plückhahn (born 14 September 1958) is a German rowing coxswain. She competed in the women's quadruple sculls event at the 1984 Summer Olympics.
