= Regina Kleine-Kuhlmann =

German rower

Personal information
- Nationality: German
- Born: 19 February 1959 (age 66); Bramsche, Germany

Sport
- Sport: Rowing

Regina Kleine-Kuhlmann (born 19 February 1959) is a German former rower. She competed in the women's quadruple sculls event at the 1984 Summer Olympics.
