= The Royal Cellar =

Romanian historical monument

The Royal Cellar is a historical monument in Odobesti, in Vrancea county of the historical region of Moldavia, Romania, dating from the 16th century. The building that houses the Royal Cellar is inscribed in the Romanian National Register of Heritage Tourism and the UNESCO conservation lists.

== History ==
According to documents, this cellar exists there since the time of Stephen the Great, prince of Moldavia. In 1834, on the estate of Prince Mihail Sturdza, were preserved the ruins of two stone cellars covered with shingles.

One of them, the Royal Cellar was consolidated with pumice from Milcov River, becoming an ideal place for aging wine in oak barrels and bottles.

The age of the building is strengthened by the inscription above the entrance in Cyrillic letters, along with the coat of arms of Moldova (Bull Head) framed by the flags.
