= Roberta Del Core =

Italian rower

Personal information
- Nationality: Italian
- Born: 23 August 1964 (age 60)

Sport
- Sport: Rowing

Roberta Del Core (born 23 August 1964) is an Italian rower. She competed in the women's quadruple sculls event at the 1984 Summer Olympics.
