= Ecaterina Oancia =

Romanian rower (1954–2024)

Medal record

Women's rowing

Representing Romania

Olympic Games
Gold medal – first place	1984 Los Angeles	Coxed quad sculls
Silver medal – second place	1988 Seoul	Eight
Bronze medal – third place	1988 Seoul	Coxed four

World Rowing Championships
Gold medal – first place	1987 Copenhagen	Eight
Gold medal – first place	1987 Copenhagen	Coxed four
Gold medal – first place	1989 Bled	Eight
Bronze medal – third place	1981 Munich	Coxed quad sculls
Bronze medal – third place	1985 Hazewinkel	Eight

Ecaterina Oancia (25 March 1954 – 3 December 2024) was a Romanian rowing cox.

Born in Sângeorgiu de Pădure, she died on 3 December 2024, at the age of 70.

== Sources ==
- Ecaterina Oancia at World Rowing
- Evans, Hilary; Gjerde, Arild; Heijmans, Jeroen; Mallon, Bill; et al. "Ecaterina Oancia". Olympics at Sports-Reference.com. Sports Reference LLC. Archived from the original on 17 April 2020.
