= Donata Minorati =

Italian rower

Personal information
- Nationality: Italian
- Born: 4 March 1965 (age 60)

Sport
- Sport: Rowing

Donata Minorati (born 4 March 1965) is an Italian rower. She competed in the women's quadruple sculls event at the 1984 Summer Olympics.
