= Alessandra Borio =

Italian rower

Personal information
- Nationality: Italian
- Born: 29 August 1965 (age 60)

Sport
- Sport: Rowing

Achievements and titles
- Olympic finals: 1984 Summer Olympics

Alessandra Borio (born 29 August 1965) is an Italian rower. She competed in the women's quadruple sculls event at the 1984 Summer Olympics.
