= Hélène Ledoux =

French rower

Personal information
- Nationality: French
- Born: 29 January 1963 (age 62)

Sport
- Sport: Rowing

Hélène Ledoux (born 29 January 1963) is a French rower. She competed in the women's quadruple sculls event at the 1984 Summer Olympics.
