= Patricia Couturier =

French rower

Personal information
- Nationality: French
- Born: 1 January 1961 (age 64)

Sport
- Sport: Rowing

Patricia Couturier (born 1 January 1961) is a French rower. She competed in the women's quadruple sculls event at the 1984 Summer Olympics.
