= Carolyn Trono =

Canadian rowing cox

Personal information
- Nationality: Canadian
- Born: 1 January 1961 (age 64) Vancouver, British Columbia, Canada

Sport
- Sport: Rowing

Carolyn Trono (born 1 January 1961) is a Canadian rowing coxswain. She competed in the women's quadruple sculls event at the 1984 Summer Olympics.

In 2016 Trono founded the Winnipeg Newcomer Sport Academy, which aims to introduce newly settled families to Canadian culture through sport.
