= Odobești =

- Town
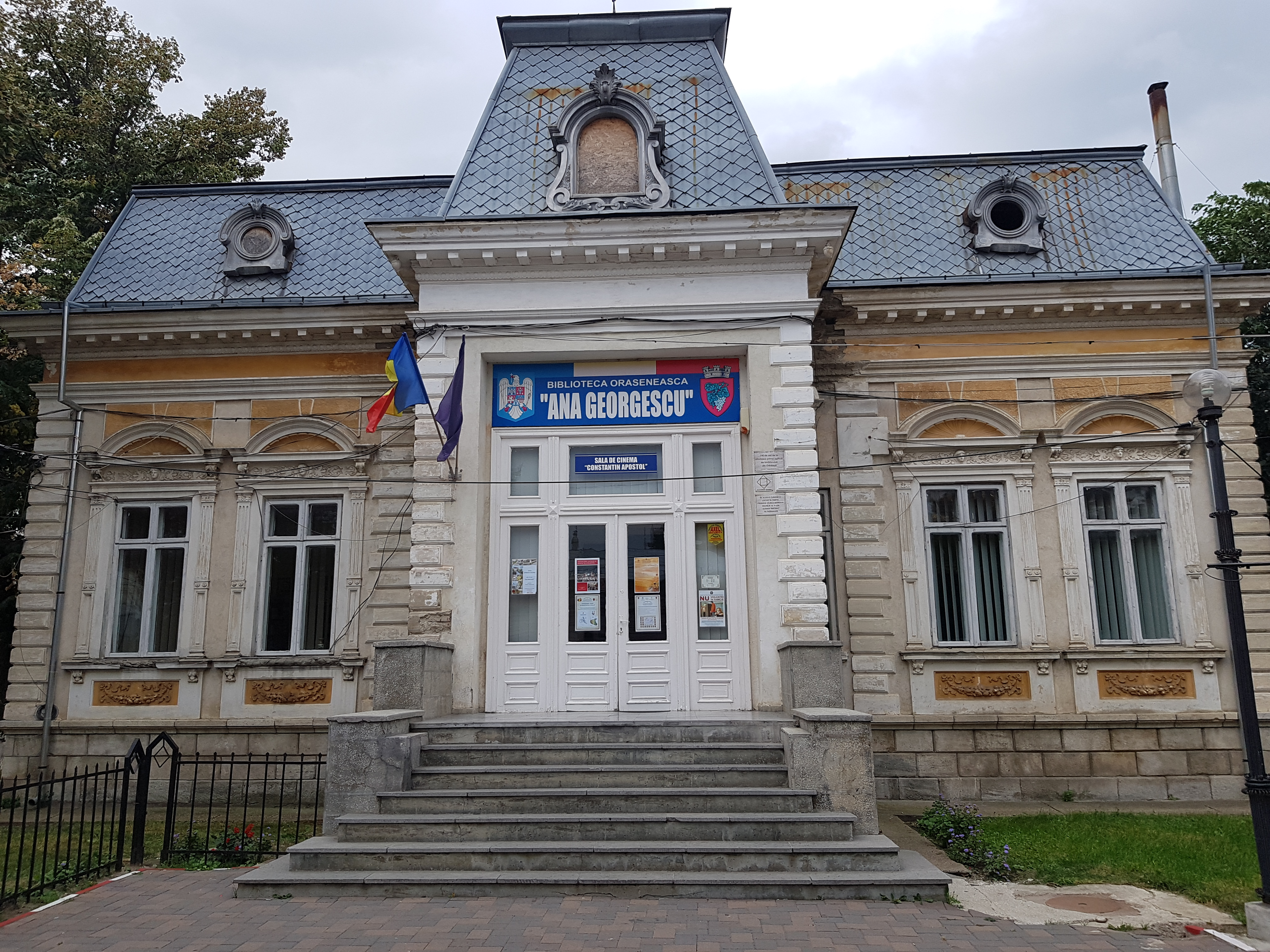
- Town library

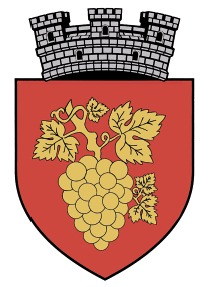
- Coat of arms

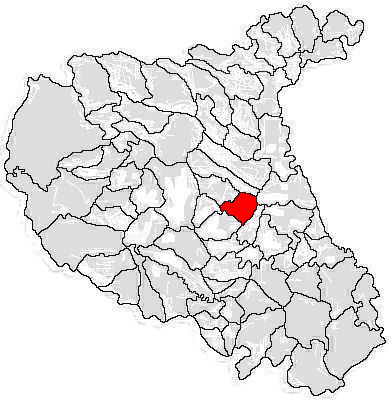
- Location in Vrancea County

- Location in Romania
- Coordinates: 45°46′N 27°4′E
- Country: Romania
- County: Vrancea

Government
  - Mayor (2024–2028): Gheorghe Daniel Nicolaș (PSD)
- Area: 57 km^{2} (22 sq mi)
- Elevation: 142 m (466 ft)
- Population (2021-12-01): 9,423
  - Density: 170/km^{2} (430/sq mi)
- Time zone: UTC+02:00 (EET)
  - Summer (DST): UTC+03:00 (EEST)
- Postal code: 625300
- Area code: +(40) 237
- Vehicle reg.: VN
- Website: www.primariaodobesti.ro

Odobești (Romanian pronunciation: [odoˈbeʃtʲ]) is a town in Vrancea County, Western Moldavia, Romania. The town administers one village, Unirea.

The town is located in the central part of the county, on the banks of the Milcov River, 10 km (6.2 mi) northwest of the county seat, Focșani.

Historical population
| Year | Pop. | ±% |
|---|---|---|
| 1912 | 5,744 | — |
| 1930 | 8,106 | +41.1% |
| 1948 | 4,482 | −44.7% |
| 1956 | 4,977 | +11.0% |
| 1966 | 5,741 | +15.4% |
| 1977 | 8,544 | +48.8% |
| 1992 | 8,572 | +0.3% |
| 2002 | 8,000 | −6.7% |
| 2011 | 9,364 | +17.1% |
| 2021 | 9,423 | +0.6% |
Source: Census data

== Natives ==
- Ioana Badea (born 1964), rower
- Mara Đorđević (1916–2003), Serbian singer of traditional songs
- Dan Moisescu (1909–1976), singer of traditional songs

== See also ==
- The Royal Cellar
