= Sofia Corban =

Romanian rower

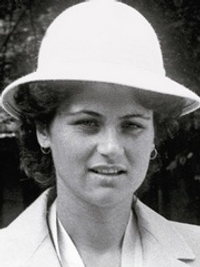

Personal information
- Full name: Sofia Corban-Banovici
- Born: 1 August 1956 (age 69) Drăgănești-Vlașca, Romania
- Height: 179 cm (5 ft 10 in)
- Weight: 78 kg (172 lb)

Sport
- Sport: Rowing
- Club: Steaua Bucharest
Medal record
Representing Romania
Olympic Games
Gold medal – first place	1984 Los Angeles	Quadruple sculls
World Rowing Championships
Bronze medal – third place	1979 Bled	Quadruple sculls
Bronze medal – third place	1981 Munich	Quadruple sculls
Bronze medal – third place	1982 Lucerne	Quadruple sculls

Sofia Corban (née Banovici, born 1 August 1956) is a retired Romanian rower who competed in the quadruple sculls. She won a gold medal at the 1984 Olympics, placing fourth in 1980, and three bronze medals at the world championships in 1979–1982.
