= Lisa Roy (rower) =

Canadian rower

Personal information
- Nationality: Canadian
- Born: 16 January 1959 (age 67) Vancouver, British Columbia, Canada

Sport
- Sport: Rowing
Medal record
Women's rowing
Representing Canada
World Rowing Championships
| Bronze medal – third place | 1982 Lucerne | W2x |

Lisa Roy (born 16 January 1959) is a Canadian rower. She competed in the women's quadruple sculls event at the 1984 Summer Olympics.
