= Ioana Badea =

Romanian rower (born 1964)

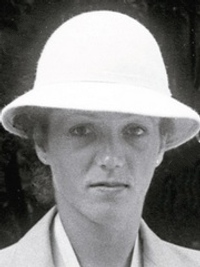

Personal information
- Born: 22 March 1964 (age 62) Odobeşti, Romania
- Height: 180 cm (5 ft 11 in)
- Weight: 78 kg (172 lb)

Sport
- Sport: Rowing
- Club: Steaua Bucuresti
Medal record
Representing Romania
Olympic Games
Gold medal – first place	1984 Los Angeles	Quadruple sculls

Ioana Badea (born 22 March 1964) is a retired Romanian rower who won a gold medal in the quadruple sculls at the 1984 Olympics. In 1990, she immigrated to France.
