= Antonella Corazza =

Italian rower

Personal information
- Nationality: Italian
- Born: 27 February 1965 (age 60)

Sport
- Sport: Rowing

Antonella Corazza (born 27 February 1965) is an Italian rower. She competed in two events at the 1984 Summer Olympics.
