= Poul Sørensen (handballer) =

Danish handball player (born 1954)

Poul Sørensen (born 23 April 1954 in Rødovre, Denmark) is a Danish former handball player who competed in the 1984 Summer Olympics.

He played his club handball with Rødovre HK. In 1984 he finished fourth with the Denmark men's national handball team in the Olympic tournament. He played all six matches as goalkeeper.
