= Søren Østberg =

Danish swimmer

Personal information
- Born: 21 February 1962 (age 64) Copenhagen, Denmark

Sport
- Sport: Swimming

Søren Østberg (born 21 February 1962) is a Danish butterfly swimmer. He competed in two events at the 1984 Summer Olympics.
