= Jens Roepstorff =

Danish handball player (born 1960)

Jens Erik Roepstorff (born 5 August 1960) is a Danish former handball player who competed in the 1984 Summer Olympics.

He played his club handball with Helsingør IF. In 1984 he finished fourth with the Denmark men's national handball team in the 1984 Olympic tournament. He played all six matches and scored 15 goals.
