= Lydie Dubedat-Briero =

French rower

Lydie Dubedat
Personal information
- Nationality: French
- Born: 15 February 1962 (age 63) Paris, France

Sport
- Sport: Rowing

Lydie Dubedat (born 15 February 1962) is a French rower. She competed at the 1984 Summer Olympics. In 1989, she placed 6th in the World Rowing Championships held in Bled, Slovenia. In 1990, she placed 5th in Tasmania, Australia.
