= Klaus Jensen =

Danish handball player (born 1963)

Klaus Sletting Jensen (born 11 October 1963) is a Danish former handball player who competed in the 1984 Summer Olympics who played as a right back player.

He played club handball with Rødovre HK, and was the top goalscorer of the club in the 1983 Danish Handball League. He also played for HIK Håndbold and for USAM Nîmes in France. In 1984 he finished fourth with the Danish team in the Olympic tournament. He played all six matches and scored 21 goals.
