= Bodil Rasmussen =

Danish rower

Medal record

Women's rowing

Representing Denmark

Olympic Games
Bronze medal – third place	1984 Los Angeles	Coxed quad sculls

Bodil Rasmussen (born 12 December 1957 in Fredericia) is a Danish rower.
