= Jette Sørensen =

Danish rowing cox

Medal record

Women's rowing

Representing Denmark

Olympic Games
Bronze medal – third place	1984 Los Angeles	Coxed quad sculls

Jette Sørensen (born 25 March 1961 in Odense) is a Danish rowing cox.
