= Kelly Rickon =

American rower (born 1959)

Personal information
- Full name: Kelly Anne Rickon
- Born: October 27, 1959 (age 66) San Diego, California, U.S.
Medal record
Women's rowing
Representing the United States
Olympic Games
| Silver medal – second place | 1984 Los Angeles | Coxed quad sculls |

Kelly Anne Rickon (born October 27, 1959) is an American former competitive rower and Olympic silver medalist.

== Olympian ==
Rickon qualified for the 1980 U.S. Olympic team but was unable to compete due to the 1980 Summer Olympics boycott. She did however receive one of 461 Congressional Gold Medals created especially for the spurned athletes. She was a member of the American women's quadruple sculls team that won the silver medal at the 1984 Summer Olympics in Los Angeles, California.
