= Birgitte Hanel =

Danish rower

Medal record

Women's rowing

Representing Denmark

Olympic Games
Bronze medal – third place	1984 Los Angeles	Coxed quad sculls

Birgitte Hanel (born 25 April 1954 in Jægersborg) is a Danish rower.
