= Lotte Koefoed =

Danish rower

Medal record

Women's rowing

Representing Denmark

Olympic Games
Bronze medal – third place	1984 Los Angeles	Coxed quad sculls

Inger Charlotte Koefoed (born 17 September 1957 in Bagsværd), known as Lotte Koefoed and since her marriage as Lotte Pedersen, is a Danish rower. She is married to Olympic rower Bjarne Pedersen.
