= Lisa Rohde =

American rower (born 1955)

Personal information
- Born: August 12, 1955 (age 71) Wakefield, Nebraska, U.S.
Medal record
Women's rowing
Representing the United States
Olympic Games
Silver medal – second place	1984 Los Angeles	Coxed quad sculls

Lisa Diane Rohde (born August 12, 1955) is an American former competitive rower and Olympic silver medalist. She was a member of the American women's quadruple sculls team that won the silver medal at the 1984 Summer Olympics in Los Angeles, California. Rohde attended the University of Nebraska from 1973 to 1976 where she learned to row. She also played on the Volleyball and Basketball teams at UNL. She graduated from the University of Pennsylvania in 1979 with a BS in Physical Therapy. She attended Medical School at the University of North Carolina at Chapel Hill from 1988 to 1992 and did her Residency in Internal Medicine at Carolinas Medical Center.
