= Hanne Eriksen =

Danish rower

Medal record

Women's rowing

Representing Denmark

Olympic Games
Bronze medal – third place	1984 Los Angeles	Coxed quad sculls

Hanne Eriksen (born 20 September 1960, in Copenhagen) is a Danish rower.
