= 2004 European Speed Skating Championships =

International speed skating competition

European Speed Skating Championships
- Venue: Heerenveen, Netherlands
- Dates: 9–11 January 2004
- Competitors: 28 men 26 women

Medalist men
1st place, gold medalist(s)		Mark Tuitert	NED
2nd place, silver medalist(s)		Carl Verheijen	NED
3rd place, bronze medalist(s)		Jochem Uytdehaage	NED

Medalist women
1st place, gold medalist(s)		Anni Friesinger	GER
2nd place, silver medalist(s)		Claudia Pechstein	GER
3rd place, bronze medalist(s)		Renate Groenewold	NED

The 2004 European Speed Skating Championships were held at Thialf in Heerenveen, Netherlands, from 9 January until 11 January 2004. Mark Tuitert and Anni Friesinger won the titles.

== Men's championships ==
=== Day 1 ===
==== 500 metres ====
Place	Athlete	Country	Time
1st place, gold medalist(s)	Mika Poutala	Finland	36.09
2nd place, silver medalist(s)	Mark Tuitert	Netherlands	36.18
3rd place, bronze medalist(s)	Jan Friesinger	Germany	36.35
4	Yevgeny Lalenkov	Russia	36.45
5	Petter Andersen	Norway	36.46
6	Jochem Uytdehaage	Netherlands	36.70
7	Ivan Skobrev	Russia	36.73
8	Christian Zoller	Austria	36.86
9	Risto Rosendahl	Finland	36.96
10	Carl Verheijen	Netherlands	37.14
11	Matteo Anesi	Italy	37.38
12	André Vreugdenhil	Belgium	37.38
13	Enrico Fabris	Italy	37.39
14	Eskil Ervik	Norway	37.49
15	Johan Röjler	Sweden	37.55
16	Gianni Romme	Netherlands	37.82
17	Igor Makovetski	Belarus	38.17
18	Tobias Schneider	Germany	38.23
19	Paweł Zygmunt	Poland	38.48
20	Artjom Detisjev	Russia	38.52
21	Lasse Sætre	Norway	38.68
22	Miroslav Vtípil	Czech Republic	38.93
23	Maksim Pedos	Ukraine	39.56
24	Claudiu Grozea	Romania	39.60
25	Ronald Bosker	Switzerland	40.10
26	Bart Veldkamp	Belgium	40.23
27	Jarmo Valtonen	Finland	56,18
28	Witold Mazur	Poland	1:15.59

==== 5000 metres ====
Place	Athlete	Country	Time
1st place, gold medalist(s)	Carl Verheijen	Netherlands	6:26.43
2nd place, silver medalist(s)	Mark Tuitert	Netherlands	6:27.63
3rd place, bronze medalist(s)	Gianni Romme	Netherlands	6:29.88
4	Jochem Uytdehaage	Netherlands	6:31.93
5	Enrico Fabris	Italy	6:34.87
6	Ivan Skobrev	Russia	6:35.55
7	Lasse Sætre	Norway	6:36.25
8	Johan Röjler	Sweden	6:36.68
9	Eskil Ervik	Norway	6:37.15
10	Artjom Detisjev	Russia	6:38.06
11	Paweł Zygmunt	Poland	6:40.54
12	Yevgeny Lalenkov	Russia	6:41.84
13	Tobias Schneider	Germany	6:45.05
14	Witold Mazur	Poland	6:46.91
15	Petter Andersen	Norway	6:47.43
16	Bart Veldkamp	Belgium	6:48.17
17	Jan Friesinger	Germany	6:48.76
18	Matteo Anesi	Italy	6:49.58
19	Claudiu Grozea	Romania	6:55.81
20	Jarmo Valtonen	Finland	6:57.62
21	Ronald Bosker	Switzerland	6:58.39
22	André Vreugdenhil	Belgium	6:58.85
23	Miroslav Vtípil	Czech Republic	7:00.04
24	Igor Makovetski	Belarus	7:02.10
25	Risto Rosendahl	Finland	7:06.25
26	Mika Poutala	Finland	7:06.81
27	Maksim Pedos	Ukraine	7:09.93
28	Christian Zoller	Austria	7:14.14

=== Day 2 ===
==== 1500 metres ====
Place	Athlete	Country	Time
1st place, gold medalist(s)	Mark Tuitert	Netherlands	1:47.41
2nd place, silver medalist(s)	Yevgeny Lalenkov	Russia}	1:48.01
3rd place, bronze medalist(s)	Carl Verheijen	Netherlands	1:48.80
4	Jochem Uytdehaage	Netherlands	1:48.90
5	Enrico Fabris	Italy	1:49.64
6	Ivan Skobrev	Russia	1:49.84
7	Petter Andersen	Norway	1:50.02
8	Gianni Romme	Netherlands	1:50.24
9	Jan Friesinger	Germany	1:50.34
10	Johan Röjler	Sweden	1:51.46
11	Risto Rosendahl	Finland	1:51.49
12	Artjom Detisjev	Russia	1:51.54
13	Matteo Anesi	Italy	1:51.77
14	Mika Poutala	Finland	1:52.27
15	Paweł Zygmunt	Poland	1:52.80
16	Jarmo Valtonen	Finland	1:53.16
17	André Vreugdenhil	Belgium	1:53.56
18	Lasse Sætre	Norway	1:53.65
19	Tobias Schneider	Germany	1:53.85
20	Christian Zoller	Austria	1:54.05
21	Bart Veldkamp	Belgium	1:54.36
22	Igor Makovetski	Belarus	1:54.75
23	Witold Mazur	Poland	1:55.28
24	Miroslav Vtípil	Czech Republic	1:55.67
25	Claudiu Grozea	Romania	1:56.25
26	Maksim Pedos	Ukraine	1:57.94
27	Ronald Bosker	Switzerland	1:57.96
28	Eskil Ervik	Norway	2:09.20

=== Day 3 ===
==== 10000 metres ====
Place	Athlete	Country	Time
1st place, gold medalist(s)	Carl Verheijen	Netherlands	13:22.91
2nd place, silver medalist(s)	Gianni Romme	Netherlands	13:26.34
3rd place, bronze medalist(s)	Lasse Sætre	Norway	13:28.29
4	Jochem Uytdehaage	Netherlands	13:30.51
5	Mark Tuitert	Netherlands	13:38.91
6	Ivan Skobrev	Russia	13:42.31
7	Artjom Detisjev	Russia	13:42.97
8	Johan Röjler	Sweden	13:50.92
9	Enrico Fabris	Italy	3:51.86
10	Paweł Zygmunt	Poland	13:52.15
11	Yevgeny Lalenkov	Russia	14:01.03
12	Tobias Schneider	Germany	14:03.20
13	Eskil Ervik	Norway	14:04.99
14	Jan Friesinger	Germany	14:11.72
15	Petter Andersen	Norway	14:18.32
16	Matteo Anesi	Italy	14:19.62

=== Allround results ===
Place	Athlete	Country	500 m	5000 m	1500 m	10000 m	points
1st place, gold medalist(s)	Mark Tuitert	Netherlands	36.18 (2)	6:27.63 (2)	1:47.41 (1)	13:38.91 (5)	151.691
2nd place, silver medalist(s)	Carl Verheijen	Netherlands	37.14 (10)	6:26.43 (1)	1:48.80 (3)	13:22.91 (1)	152.194
3rd place, bronze medalist(s)	Jochem Uytdehaage	Netherlands	36.70 (6)	6:31.93 (4)	1:48.90 (4)	13:30.51 (4)	152.718
4	Gianni Romme	Netherlands	37.82 (16)	6:29.88 (3)	1:50.24 (8)	13:26.34 (2)	153.871
5	Ivan Skobrev	Russia	36.73 (7)	6:35.55 (6)	1:49.84 (6)	13:42.31 (6)	154.013
6	Yevgeny Lalenkov	Russia	36.45 (4)	6:41.84 (12)	1:48.01 (2)	14:01.03 (11)	154.688
7	Enrico Fabris	Italy	37.39 (13)	6:34.87 (5)	1:49.64 (5)	13:51.86 (9)	155.016
8	Johan Röjler	Sweden	37.55 (15)	6:36.68 (8)	1:51.46 (10)	13:50.92 (8)	155.917
9	Jan Friesinger	Germany	36.35 (3)	6:48.76 (17)	1:50.34 (9)	14:11.72 (14)	156.592
10	Lasse Sætre	Norway	38.68 (21)	6:36.25 (7)	1:53.65 (18)	13:28.29 (3)	156.602
11	Artjom Detisjev	Russia	38.52 (20)	6:38.06 (10)	1:51.54 (12)	13:42.97 (7)	156.654
12	Petter Andersen	Norway	36.46 (5)	6:47.43 (15)	1:50.02 (7)	14:18.32 (15)	156.792
13	Paweł Zygmunt	Poland	38.48 (19)	6:40.54 (11)	1:52.80 (15)	13:52.15 (10)	157.741
14	Matteo Anesi	Italy	37.38 (11)	6:49.58 (18)	1;51.77 (13)	14:19.62 (16)	158.575
15	Tobias Schneider	Germany	38.23 (18)	6:45.05 (13)	1:53.85 (19)	14:03.20 (12)	158.845
16	Eskil Ervik	Norway	37.49 (14)	6:37.15 (9)	2:09.20 (28f)	14:04.99 (13)	162.520
17	Mika Poutala	Finland	36.09 (1)	7:06.81 (26)	1:52.27 (14)	NQ	116.194
18	Risto Rosendahl	Finland	36.96 (9)	7:06.25 (25)	1:51.49 (11)	NQ	116.748
19	André Vreugdenhil	Belgium	37.38 (12)	6:58.85 (22)	1:53.56 (17)	NQ	117.118
20	Christian Zoller	Austria	36.86 (8)	7:14.14 (28)	1:54.05 (20)	NQ	118.290
21	Igor Makovetski	Belarus	38.18 (17)	7:02.10 (24)	1:54.75 (22)	NQ	118.640
22	Bart Veldkamp	Belgium	40.23 (26)	6:48.17 (16)	1:54.36 (21)	NQ	119.167
23	Miroslav Vtípil	Czech Republic	38.93 (22)	7:00.04 (23)	1:55.67 (24)	NQ	119.490
24	Claudiu Grozea	Romania	39.60 (24)	6:55.81 (19)	1:56.25 (25)	NQ	119.931
25	Ronald Bosker	Switzerland	40.10 (25)	6:58.39 (21)	1:57.96 (27)	NQ	121.259
26	Maksim Pedos	Ukraine	39.56 (23)	7:09.93 (27)	1:57.94 (26)	NQ	121.866
27	Jarmo Valtonen	Finland	56.18 (27f)	6:57.62 (20)	1:53.16 (16)	NQ	135.662
28	Witold Mazur	Poland	1:15.59 (28f)	6:46.91 (14)	1:55.28 (23)	NQ	154.707

NQ = Not qualified for the 10000 m (only the best 16 are qualified)
DNS = Did not start
DQ = Disqualified

Source: ISU

== Women's championships ==
=== Day 1 ===
Place	Athlete	Country	Time
1st place, gold medalist(s)	Anni Friesinger	Germany	39.28
2nd place, silver medalist(s)	Wieteke Cramer	Netherlands	39.53
3rd place, bronze medalist(s)	Claudia Pechstein	Germany	40.08
4	Barbara de Loor	Netherlands	40.21
5	Nicola Mayr	Italy	40.29
6	Renate Groenewold	Netherlands	40.34
7	Yuliya Skokova	Russia	40.53
8	Varvara Barysheva	Russia	40.62
9	Daniela Anschütz-Thoms	Germany	40.67
10	Hedvig Bjelkevik	Norway	40.71
11	Annette Bjelkevik	Norway	40.74
12	Bianca Anghel	Romania	40.92
13	Lucille Opitz	Germany	41.01
14	Krisztina Egyed	Hungary	41.14
15	Galina Likhachova	Russia	41.30
16	Olena Myahkikh	Ukraine	41.39
17	Olga Tarasova	Russia	41.52
18	Daniela Oltean	Romania	41.66
19	Sofia Albertsson	Sweden	41.70
20	Adelia Marra	Italy	41.86
21	Martina Sáblíková	Czech Republic	42.27
22	Gretha Smit	Netherlands	42.69
23	Yulia Yasenok	Belarus	42.92
24	Johanna Mäki-Laine	Finland	43.26
25	Henriët Bosker-van der Meer	Switzerland	43.99
26	Katarzyna Wojcicka	Poland	52.55

=== Day 2 ===
==== 1500 metres ====
Place	Athlete	Country	Time
1st place, gold medalist(s)	Renate Groenewold	Netherlands	1:57.81
2nd place, silver medalist(s)	Anni Friesinger	Germany	1:58.24
3rd place, bronze medalist(s)	Claudia Pechstein	Germany	1:58.37
4	Wieteke Cramer	Netherlands	2:00.20
5	Barbara de Loor	Netherlands	2:00.46
6	Olga Tarasova	Russia	2:01.76
7	Gretha Smit	Netherlands	2:02.22
8	Lucille Opitz	Germany	2:02.44
9	Galina Likhachova	Russia	2:02.47
10	Varvara Barysheva	Russia	2:02.62
11	Daniela Anschütz-Thoms	Germany	2:03.39
12	Nicola Mayr	Italy	2:03.40
13	Daniela Oltean	Romania	2:03.42
14	Bianca Anghel	Romania	2:03.57
15	Katarzyna Wojcicka	Poland	2:03.62
16	Hedvig Bjelkevik	Norway	2:04.59
17	Annette Bjelkevik	Norway	2:05.13
18	Olena Myahkikh	Ukraine	2:05.81
19	Krisztina Egyed	Hungary	2:06.82
20	Martina Sáblíková	Czech Republic	2:06.90
21	Henriët Bosker-van der Meer	Switzerland	2:07.62
22	Sofia Albertsson	Sweden	2:07.74
23	Adelia Marra	Italy	2:08.19
24	Yulia Yasenok	Belarus	2:08.98
25	Johanna Mäki-Laine	Finland	2:12.28
26	Yuliya Skokova	Russia	2:21.54

==== 3000 metres ====
Place	Athlete	Country	Time
1st place, gold medalist(s)	Gretha Smit	Netherlands	4:07.96
2nd place, silver medalist(s)	Anni Friesinger	Germany	4:08.28
3rd place, bronze medalist(s)	Renate Groenewold	Netherlands	4:08.45
4	Claudia Pechstein	Germany	4:09.37
5	Wieteke Cramer	Netherlands	4:14.18
6	Barbara de Loor	Netherlands	4:15.30
7	Lucille Opitz	Germany	4:15.61
8	Olga Tarasova	Russia	4:16.20
9	Nicola Mayr	Italy	4:18.67
10	Varvara Barysheva	Russia	4:19.14
11	Galina Likhachova	Russia	4:20.27
12	Daniela Anschütz-Thoms	Germany	4:21.73
13	Daniela Oltean	Romania	4:21.79
14	Yuliya Skokova	Russia	4:22.51
15	Martina Sáblíková	Czech Republic	4:22.61
16	Bianca Anghel	Romania	4:22.77
17	Katarzyna Wojcicka	Poland	4:22.96
18	Annette Bjelkevik	Norway	4:23.95
19	Hedvig Bjelkevik	Norway	4:25.06
20	Henriët Bosker-van der Meer	Switzerland	4:25.31
21	Adelia Marra	Italy	4:27.37
22	Krisztina Egyed	Hungary	4:29.62
23	Sofia Albertsson	Sweden	4:30.08
24	Olena Myahkikh	Ukraine	4:30.32
25	Yulia Yasenok	Belarus	4:36.05
26	Johanna Mäki-Laine	Finland	4:36.15

=== Day 3 ===
==== 5000 metres ====
Place	Athlete	Country	Time
1st place, gold medalist(s)	Gretha Smit	Netherlands	6:58.34
2nd place, silver medalist(s)	Claudia Pechstein	Germany	7:03.15
3rd place, bronze medalist(s)	Anni Friesinger	Germany	7:06.44
4	Renate Groenewold	Netherlands	7:08.45
5	Barbara de Loor	Netherlands	7:14.77
6	Wieteke Cramer	Netherlands	7:15.41
7	Olga Tarasova	Russia	7:17.31
8	Lucille Opitz	Germany	7:18.70
9	Daniela Anschütz-Thoms	Germany	7:20.63
10	Galina Likhachova	Russia	7:20.98
11	Varvara Barysheva	Russia	7:22.18
12	Nicola Mayr	Italy	7:22.20
13	Daniela Oltean	Romania	7:27.14
14	Yuliya Skokova	Russia	7:30.38
15	Bianca Anghel	Romania	7:33.57
16	Hedvig Bjelkevik	Norway	7:37.14

=== Allround results ===
Place	Athlete	Country	500 m	1500 m	3000 m	5000 m	points
1st place, gold medalist(s)	Anni Friesinger	Germany	39.28 (1)	1:58.24 (2)	4:08.28 (2)	7:06.44 (3)	162.717
2nd place, silver medalist(s)	Claudia Pechstein	Germany	40.08 (3)	1:58.37 (3)	4:09.37 (4)	7:03.15 (2)	163.412
3rd place, bronze medalist(s)	Renate Groenewold	Netherlands	40.34 (6)	1:57.81 (1)	4:08.45 (3)	7:08.45 (4)	163.863
4	Wieteke Cramer	Netherlands	39.53 (2)	2:00.20 (4)	4:14.18 (5)	7:15.41 (6)	165.500
5	Barbara de Loor	Netherlands	40.21 (4)	2:00.46 (5)	4:15.30 (6)	7:14.77 (5)	166.390
6	Gretha Smit	Netherlands	42.69 (22)	2:02.22 (7)	4:07.96 (1)	6:58.34 (1)	166.590
7	Lucille Opitz	Germany	41.01 (13)	2:02.44 (8)	4:15.61 (7)	7:18.70 (8)	168.294
8	Olga Tarasova	Russia	41.52 (17)	2:01.76 (6)	4:16.20 (8)	7:17.31 (7)	168.537
9	Nicola Mayr	Italy	40.29 (5)	2:03.40 (12)	4:18.67 (9)	7:22.20 (12)	168.754
10	Varvara Barysheva	Russia	40.62 (8)	2:02.62 (10)	4:19.14 (10)	7:22.18 (11)	168.901
11	Daniela Anschütz-Thoms	Germany	40.67 (9)	2:03.39 (11)	4:21.,73 (12)	7:20.63 (9)	169.484
12	Galina Likhachova	Russia	41.30 (15)	2:02.47 (9)	4:20.27 (11)	7:20.98 (10)	169.599
13	Daniela Oltean	Romania	41.66 (18)	2:03.42 (13)	4:21.79 (13)	7:27.14 (13)	171.145
14	Bianca Anghel	Romania	40.92 (12)	2:03.57 (14)	4:22.77 (16)	7:33.57 (15)	171.262
15	Hedvig Bjelkevik	Norway	40.71 (10)	2:04.59 (16)	4:25.06 (19)	7:37.14 (16)	172.130
16	Yuliya Skokova	Russia	40.53 (7)	2:21.54 (26f)	4:22.51 (14)	7:30.38 (14)	176.499
17	Annette Bjelkevik	Norway	40.74 (11)	2:05.13 (17)	4:23.95 (18)	NQ	126.441
18	Krisztina Egyed	Hungary	41.14 (14)	2:06.82 (19)	4:29.62 (22)	NQ	128.349
19	Olena Myahkikh	Ukraine	41.39 (16)	2:05.81 (18)	4:30.32 (24)	NQ	128.379
20	Martina Sáblíková	Czech Republic	42.57 (21)	2:06.90 (20)	4:22.61 (15)	NQ	128.638
21	Adelia Marra	Italy	41.86 (20)	2:08.19 (23)	4:27.37 (21)	NQ	129.151
22	Sofia Albertsson	Sweden	41.70 (19)	2:07.74 (22)	4:30.08 (23)	NQ	129.293
23	Henriët Bosker-van der Meer	Switzerland	43.99 (25)	2:07.62 (21)	4:25.31 (20)	NQ	130.748
24	Joelija Jasenok	Belarus	42,92 (23)	2.08,98 (24)	4.36,05 (25)	NQ	131,921
25	Johanna Mäki-Laine	Finland	43,26 (24)	2.12,28 (25)	4.36,15 (26)	NQ	133,378
26	Katarzyna Wójcicka	Poland	52,55 * (26)	2.03,62 (15)	4.22,96 (17)	NQ	137,582

NQ = Not qualified for the 5000 m (only the best 16 are qualified)
DNS = Did not start
DQ = Disqualified * fall

Source: ISU

== Rules ==
All participating skaters are allowed to skate the first three distances; 16 skaters may take part on the fourth distance. These 16 skaters are determined by taking the standings on the longest of the first three distances, as well as the samalog standings after three distances, and comparing these lists as follows:

1. Skaters among the top 12 on both lists are qualified.
2. To make up a total of 16, skaters are then added in order of their best rank on either list. Samalog standings take precedence over the longest-distance standings in the event of a tie.

== See also ==
- 2004 World Allround Speed Skating Championships
