= 2003 World Allround Speed Skating Championships =

International speed skating competition

World Allround Speed Skating Championships
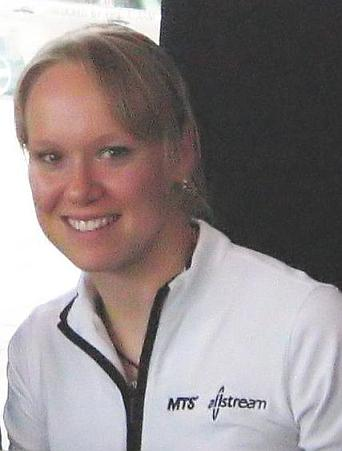
- Cindy Klassen (Canada)
- Location: Gothenburg, Sweden
- Venue: Ruddalens IP
- Dates: 8–9 February
- Competitors: 48

Medalist men
| 1st place, gold medalist(s) | | Gianni Romme | NED |
| 2nd place, silver medalist(s) | | Rintje Ritsma | NED |
| 3rd place, bronze medalist(s) | | Ids Postma | NED |

Medalist women
| 1st place, gold medalist(s) | | Cindy Klassen | CAN |
| 2nd place, silver medalist(s) | | Claudia Pechstein | GER |
| 3rd place, bronze medalist(s) | | Daniela Anschütz | GER |

The 2003 World Allround Speed Skating Championships were held in Ruddalens IP in Gothenburg, Sweden, on 8–9 February 2003. Canadian Cindy Klassen and Dutchman Gianni Romme became the world champions.

The competitions were held in a Sweden where the interest for speed skating had declined throughout the 1990s.

== Men's championships ==
=== Allround results ===
| Place | Athlete | Country | Points | 500 m | 5000 m | 1500 m | 10000 m |
|---|---|---|---|---|---|---|---|
| 1st place, gold medalist(s) | Gianni Romme | Netherlands | 158.105 | 38,23 (17) | 6.42,67 (1) | 1.52,07 (3) | 14.05,04 (1) |
| 2nd place, silver medalist(s) | Rintje Ritsma | Netherlands | 158.889 | 37,67 (11) | 6.48,07 (2) | 1.53,54 (5) | 14.11,32 (2) |
| 3rd place, bronze medalist(s) | Ids Postma | Netherlands | 159.013 | 36,89 (1) | 6.53,37 (4) | 1.53,08 (4) | 14.21,87 (6) |
| 4 | Mark Tuitert | Netherlands | 159.380 | 37,56 (7) | 6.55,67 (8) | 1.51,74 (2) | 14.20,15 (4) |
| 5 | Yevgeni Lalenkov | Russia | 159.851 | 37,05 (2) | 6.55,81 (9) | 1.51,70 (1) | 14.39,75 (10) |
| 6 | Eskil Ervik | Norway | 160.687 | 38,69 (20) | 6.52,94 (3) | 1.54,14 (10) | 14.13,14 (3) |
| 7 | Dmitry Shepel | Russia | 161.076 | 37,35 (4) | 6.58,29 (11) | 1.55,02 (15) | 14.31,14 (8) |
| 8 | K. C. Boutiette | United States | 161.085 | 37,58 (9) | 6.57,76 (10) | 1.54,51 (12) | 14.31,18 (9) |
| 9 | Johan Röjler | Sweden | 161.150 | 38,04 (16) | 6.55,32 (7) | 1.54,99 (14) | 14.24,97 (7) |
| 10 | Jan Friesinger | Germany | 161.906 | 37,59 (10) | 6.59,03 (12) | 1.55,02 (15) | 14.41,46 (11) |
| 11 | Paweł Zygmunt | Poland | 162.026 | 38,85 (21) | 6.54,46 (5) | 1.56,05 (18) | 14.20,94 (5) |
| DQ4 | Enrico Fabris | Italy | 117.982 | 38,46 (18) | 6.55,16 (6) | 1.54,02 (8) | 14.35,11 (DQ) |
| NQ13 | Derek Parra | United States | 117.643 | 37,35 (4) | 7.02,50 (16) | 1.54,13 (9) | |
| NQ14 | Kevin Marshall | Canada | 117.851 | 37,18 (3) | 7.05,65 (19) | 1.54,32 (11) | |
| NQ15 | Dustin Molicki | Canada | 117.974 | 37,99 (15) | 6.59,91 (13) | 1.53,98 (7) | |
| NQ16 | Shani Davis | United States | 118.080 | 37,69 (12) | 7.04,84 (18) | 1.53,72 (6) | |
| NQ17 | Takahiro Nozaki | Japan | 119.046 | 37,87 (14) | 7.09,76 (21) | 1.54,60 (13) | |
| NQ18 | Takahiro Ushiyama | Japan | 119.077 | 37,36 (6) | 7.07,34 (20) | 1.56,95 (22) | |
| NQ19 | Chris Callis | United States | 119.178 | 37,56 (7) | 7.11,78 (22) | 1.55,32 (17) | |
| NQ20 | Kazuaki Kobayashi | Japan | 119.856 | 37,84 (13) | 7.12,56 (23) | 1.56,28 (19) | |
| NQ21 | Lasse Sætre | Norway | 120.248 | 39,27 (22) | 6.59,98 *(14) | 1.56,94 (21) | |
| NQ22 | Mark Knoll | Canada | 121.010 | 39,42 (23) | 7.03,07 (17) | 1.57,85 (23) | |
| NQ23 | Steven Elm | Canada | 121.013 | 38,68 (19) | 7.15,13 (24) | 1.56,46 (20) | |
| NQ24 | Toshihiko Itokawa | Japan | 121.395 | 39,78 (24) | 7.01,99 (15) | 1.58,25 (24) | |

NQ = Not qualified for the 10000 m (only the best 12 are qualified)
DQ = disqualified

== Women's championships ==
=== Allround results ===
| Place | Athlete | Country | Points | 500 m | 3000 m | 1500 m | 5000 m |
|---|---|---|---|---|---|---|---|
| 1st place, gold medalist(s) | Cindy Klassen | Canada | 170.545 | 40,16 (2) | 4.21,28 (2) | 2.05,10 (3) | 7.31,39 (3) |
| 2nd place, silver medalist(s) | Claudia Pechstein | Germany | 171.144 | 41,20 (5) | 4.19,99 (1) | 2.04,99 (2) | 7.29,50 (2) |
| 3rd place, bronze medalist(s) | Daniela Anschütz | Germany | 173.633 | 41,40 (6) | 4.24,46 (6) | 2.07,28 (9) | 7.37,31 (6) |
| 4 | Kristina Groves | Canada | 173.726 | 42,11 (16) | 4.22,72 (5) | 2.06,30 (6) | 7.37,30 (5) |
| 5 | Jennifer Rodriguez | United States | 173.817 | 40,01 (1) | 4.29,39 (12) | 2.05,79 (5) | 7.49,79 (11) |
| 6 | Clara Hughes | Canada | 173.897 | 43,31 (23) | 4.21,38 (3) | 2.07,31 (10) | 7.25,88 (1) |
| 7 | Maki Tabata | Japan | 174.050 | 40,95 (3) | 4.29,31 (11) | 2.04,71 (1) | 7.46,45 (10) |
| 8 | Catherine Raney | United States | 174.381 | 42,99 (22) | 4.21,99 (4) | 2.06,98 (8) | 7.34,00 (4) |
| 9 | Renate Groenewold | Netherlands | 174.388 | 41,66 (8) | 4.28,31 (10) | 2.05,69 (4) | 7.41,14 (8) |
| 10 | Marja Vis | Netherlands | 175.080 | 41,83 (10) | 4.25,71 (7) | 2.07,33 (11) | 7.45,22 (9) |
| 11 | Annamarie Thomas | Netherlands | 176.002 | 40,98 (4) | 4.30,60 (15) | 2.06,36 (7) | 7.58,02 (12) |
| 12 | Svetlana Vysokova | Russia | 176.193 | 42,77 (20) | 4.27,50 (8) | 2.08,41 (13) | 7.40,37 (7) |
| NQ13 | Tara Risling | Canada | 129.943 | 41,85 (12) | 4.29,64 (14) | 2.09,46 (19) | |
| NQ14 | Yulia Skokova | Russia | 130.016 | 41,91 (13) | 4.31,22 (17) | 2.08,71 (15) | |
| NQ15 | Svetlana Bazhanova | Russia | 130.079 | 42,08 (15) | 4.31,46 (18) | 2.08,27 (12) | |
| NQ16 | Nami Nemoto | Japan | 130.351 | 42,24 (18) | 4.30,83 (16) | 2.08,92 (16) | |
| NQ17 | Lucille Opitz | Germany | 130.523 | 42,38 (19) | 4.31,80 (19) | 2.08,53 (14) | |
| NQ18 | Nicola Mayr | Italy | 130.673 | 41,77 (9) | 4.34,22 (21) | 2.09,60 (20) | |
| NQ19 | Valentina Yakshina | Russia | 130.859 | 42,83 (21) | 4.29,62 (13) | 2.09,28 (18) | |
| NQ20 | Emese Dörfler-Antal | Austria | 131.114 | 42,12 (17) | 4.33,11 (20) | 2.10,43 (21) | |
| NQ21 | Yuri Obara | Japan | 131.434 | 41,83 (10) | 4.39,17 (22) | 2.09,23 (17) | |
| NQ22 | Annette Bjelkevik | Norway | 132.641 | 42,07 (14) | 4.40,91 (23) | 2.11,26 (22) | |
| NQ23 | Daniela Oltean | Romania | 136.699 | 44,17 (24) | 4.41,86 (24) | 2.16,66 (23) | |
| NQ24 | Katrin Kalex | Germany | 144.119 | 41,56 (7) | 4.28,22 (9) | 2.53,57 *(24) | |

NQ = Not qualified for the 5000 m (only the best 12 are qualified)
DQ = disqualified

== Rules ==
All 24 participating skaters are allowed to skate the first three distances; 12 skaters may take part on the fourth distance. These 12 skaters are determined by taking the standings on the longest of the first three distances, as well as the samalog standings after three distances, and comparing these lists as follows:

1. Skaters among the top 12 on both lists are qualified.
2. To make up a total of 12, skaters are then added in order of their best rank on either list. Samalog standings take precedence over the longest-distance standings in the event of a tie.
