= Speed skating at the 2002 Winter Olympics =

Competition at the 2002 Olympic Winter Games

Speed skating at the XIX Olympic Winter Games
- Venue: Utah Olympic Oval
- Dates: 9–23 February 2002
- No. of events: 10
- Competitors: 166 from 23 nations

Speed skating at the 2002 Winter Olympics was held over fourteen days, from 9 to 23 February. Ten events were contested at the Utah Olympic Oval.

== Medal summary ==
=== Medal table ===
Rank	Nation	Gold	Silver	Bronze	Total
1	Netherlands	3	5	0	8
2	Germany	3	3	2	8
3	United States	3	1	4	8
4	Canada	1	0	2	3
5	Japan	0	1	0	1
6	Norway	0	0	2	2
Totals (6 entries)		10	10	10	30

=== Men's events ===
Event	Gold		Silver		Bronze	
500 metres	Casey FitzRandolph; United States	69.23	Hiroyasu Shimizu; Japan	69.26	Kip Carpenter; United States	69.47
1000 metres	Gerard van Velde; Netherlands	1:07.18 WR	Jan Bos; Netherlands	1:07.53	Joey Cheek; United States	1:07.61
1500 metres	Derek Parra; United States	1:43.95 WR	Jochem Uytdehaage; Netherlands	1:44.57	Ådne Søndrål; Norway	1:45.26
5000 metres	Jochem Uytdehaage; Netherlands	6:14.66 WR	Derek Parra; United States	6:17.98	Jens Boden; Germany	6:21.73
10,000 metres	Jochem Uytdehaage; Netherlands	12:58.92 WR	Gianni Romme; Netherlands	13:10.03	Lasse Sætre; Norway	13:16.92

=== Women's events ===
Event	Gold		Silver		Bronze	
500 metres	Catriona Le May Doan; Canada	74.75	Monique Garbrecht-Enfeldt; Germany	74.94	Sabine Völker; Germany	75.19
1000 metres	Chris Witty; United States	1:13.83 WR	Sabine Völker; Germany	1:13.96	Jennifer Rodriguez; United States	1:14.24
1500 metres	Anni Friesinger; Germany	1:54.02 WR	Sabine Völker; Germany	1:54.97	Jennifer Rodriguez; United States	1:55.32
3000 metres	Claudia Pechstein; Germany	3:57.70 WR	Renate Groenewold; Netherlands	3:58.94	Cindy Klassen; Canada	3:58.97
5000 metres	Claudia Pechstein; Germany	6:46.91 WR	Gretha Smit; Netherlands	6:49.22	Clara Hughes; Canada	6:53.53

== Records ==
Salt Lake City's high altitude was a major contributing factor to the speed of the Utah Olympic Oval's ice, as new Olympic records were set in all ten events, and new World records in eight.

Event	Date	Round	Athlete	Country	Time	OR	WR
Men's 500 metres	11 February	Heat 1	Casey FitzRandolph	United States	34.42	OR	
Men's 1000 metres	16 February		Gerard van Velde	Netherlands	1:07.18	OR	WR
Men's 1500 metres	19 February		Derek Parra	United States	1:43.95	OR	WR
Men's 5000 metres	9 February		Jochem Uytdehaage	Netherlands	6:14.66	OR	WR
Men's 10000 metres	22 February		Jochem Uytdehaage	Netherlands	12:58.92	OR	WR
Women's 500 metres	13 February	Heat 1	Catriona Le May Doan	Canada	37.30	OR	
Women's 1000 metres	17 February		Chris Witty	United States	1:13.83	OR	WR
Women's 1500 metres	20 February		Anni Friesinger	Germany	1:54.02	OR	WR
Women's 3000 metres	10 February		Claudia Pechstein	Germany	3:57.70	OR	WR
Women's 5000 metres	23 February		Claudia Pechstein	Germany	6:46.91	OR	WR

== Participating NOCs ==
Twenty-three nations competed in the speed skating events at Salt Lake City.

- Austria (1)
- Belarus (5)
- Belgium (1)
- Canada (15)
- China (12)
- Czech Republic (1)
- Finland (3)
- France (1)
- Germany (13)
- Hungary (2)
- Italy (8)
- Japan (20)
- Kazakhstan (8)
- South Korea (12)
- Latvia (1)
- Netherlands (17)
- Norway (7)
- Poland (4)
- Romania (2)
- Russia (13)
- Sweden (1)
- Ukraine (2)
- United States (17)
