= 2004 World Allround Speed Skating Championships =

International speed skating competition

World Allround Speed Skating Championships
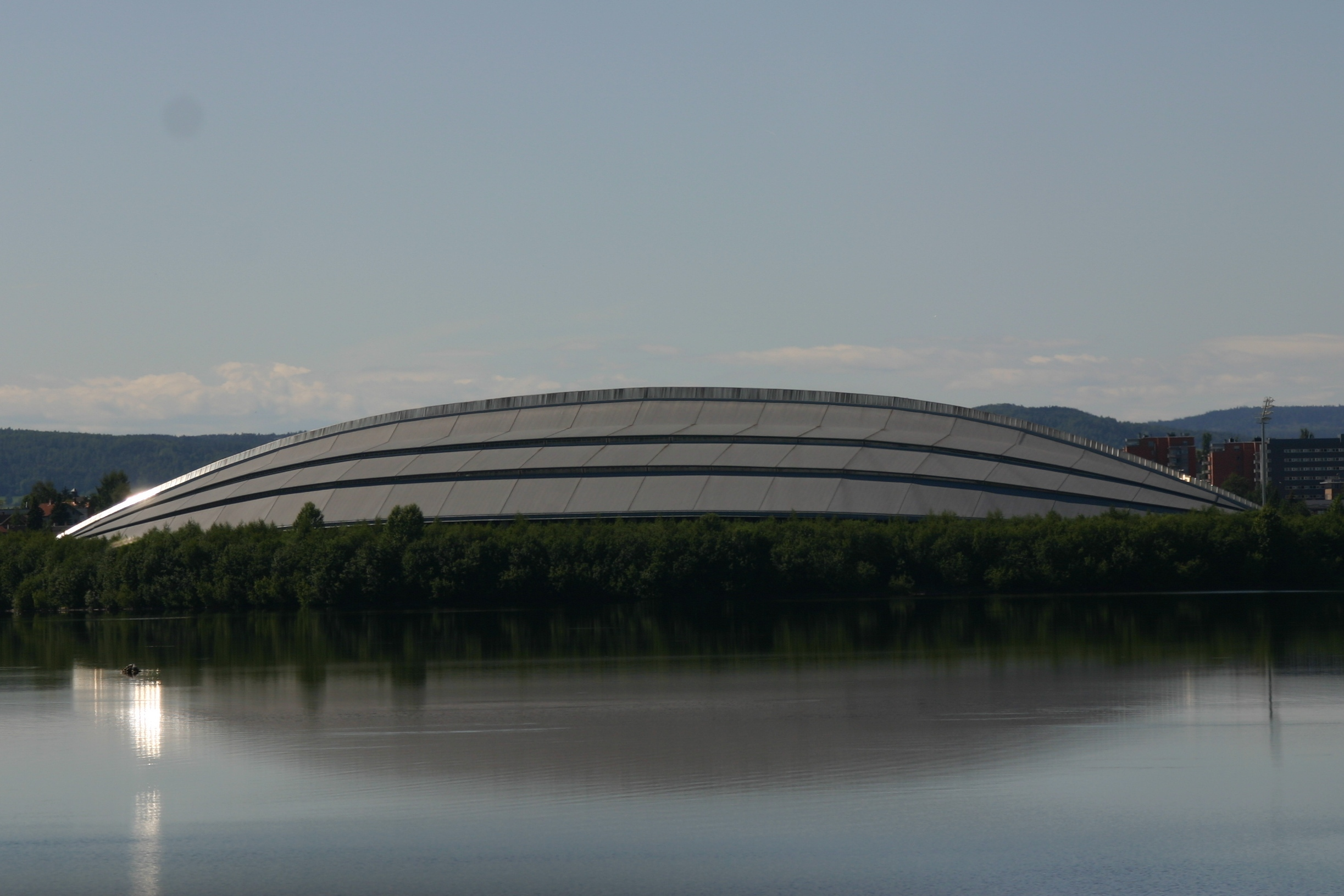
- Vikingskipet (Hamar)
- Location: Hamar, Norway
- Venue: Vikingskipet
- Dates: 7 and 8 February
- Competitors: 48

Medalist men
1st place, gold medalist(s)		Chad Hedrick	USA
2nd place, silver medalist(s)		Shani Davis	USA
3rd place, bronze medalist(s)		Carl Verheijen	NED

Medalist women
1st place, gold medalist(s)		Renate Groenewold	NED
2nd place, silver medalist(s)		Claudia Pechstein	GER
3rd place, bronze medalist(s)		Wieteke Cramer	NED

The 2004 World Allround Speed Skating Championships were held in Vikingskipet in Hamar, Norway, on 7 and 8 February 2004:

Dutchwoman Renate Groenewold and American Chad Hedrick became the world champions.

== Men's championships ==
=== Allround results ===
Place	Athlete	Country	Points	500 m	5000 m	1500 m	10000 m
1st place, gold medalist(s)	Chad Hedrick	United States	150.478	36,49 (5)	6.20,69 (2)	1.47,51 (5)	13.21,67 (2)
2nd place, silver medalist(s)	Shani Davis	United States	150.726	36,19 (3)	6.24,00 (4)	1.46,02 (1)	13.35,93 (5)
3rd place, bronze medalist(s)	Carl Verheijen	Netherlands	151.110	37,35 (16)	6.20,61 (1)	1.47,42 (4)	13.17,86 (1)
4	Enrico Fabris	Italy	151.529	36,75 (8)	6.23,67 (3)	1.47,80 (7)	13.29,59 (3)
5	Mark Tuitert	Netherlands	151.536	36,04 (2)	6.28,31 (7)	1.46,28 (2)	13.44,79 (7)
6	Tom Prinsen	Netherlands	152.646	37,09 (15)	6.26,29 (5)	1.48,73 (9)	13.33,69 (4)
7	K. C. Boutiette	United States	153.045	36,69 (7)	6.32,88 (11)	1.48,27 (8)	13.39,55 (6)
8	Yevgeny Lalenkov	Russia	153.729	35,78 (1)	6.38,36 (16)	1.47,64 (6)	14.04,67 (11)
9	Ivan Skobrev	Russia	153.864	36,80 (10)	6.33,89 (12)	1.49,22 (11)	13.45,38 (8)
10	Johan Röjler	Sweden	154.279	37,05 (13)	6.31,19 (9)	1.50,08 (16)	13.48,35 (9)
11	Derek Parra	United States	154.428	36,29 (4)	6.38,35 (15)	1.47,38 (3)	14.10,20 (12)
12	Eskil Ervik	Norway	155.704	38,52 (24)	6.27,54 (6)	1.50,03 (15)	13.55,09 (10)
NQ13	Matteo Anesi	Italy	113.274	36,95 (11)	6.40,38 (17)	1.48,86 (10)	
NQ14	Jan Friesinger	Germany	113.480	36,61 (6)	6.43,67 (21)	1.49,51 (14)	
NQ15	Arne Dankers	Canada	113.994	38,40 (23)	6.31,81 (10)	1.49,24 (12)	
NQ16	Li Changyu	China	114.059	36,79 (9)	6.43,63 (20)	1.50,72 (18)	
NQ17	Tobias Schneider	Germany	114.220	37,60 (19)	6.35,60 (14)	1.51,18 (20)	
NQ18	Steven Elm	Canada	114.472	37,06 (14)	6.46,46 (23)	1.50,30 (17)	
NQ19	Jay Morrison	Canada	114.477	37,36 (17)	6.46,51 (24)	1.49,40 (13)	
NQ20	Andrey Burlyayev	Russia	114.689	37,53 (18)	6.42,03 (19)	1.50,87 (19)	
NQ21	Paweł Zygmunt	Poland	114.898	38,12 (21)	6.35,25 (13)	1.51,76 (22)	
NQ22	Kesato Miyazaki	Japan	115358	37,72 (20)	6.44,28 (22)	1.51,63 (21)	
NQ23	Lasse Sætre	Norway	78.344	38,26 (22)	6.40,84 (18)	NS	
NQ24	Jochem Uytdehaage	Netherlands	76.041	36,98 (12)	6.30,61 (8)	NS	

NQ = Not qualified for the 10000 m (only the best 12 are qualified)
DQ = disqualified
NS = Not started

== Women's championships ==
=== Allround results ===
Place	Athlete	Country	Points	500 m	3000 m	1500 m	5000 m
1st place, gold medalist(s)	Renate Groenewold	Netherlands	162.573	40,26 (9)	4.04,58 (1)	1.57,48 (2)	7.03,90 (2)
2nd place, silver medalist(s)	Claudia Pechstein	Germany	163.291	39,85 (5)	4.05,62 (3)	1.57,78 (3)	7.12,45 (5)
3rd place, bronze medalist(s)	Wieteke Cramer	Netherlands	163.916	39,40 (3)	4.07,60 (6)	2.00,06 (9)	7.12,30 (4)
4	Jennifer Rodriguez	United States	164.555	38,74 (1)	4.13,73 (14)	1.57,33 (1)	7.24,17 (11)
5	Eriko Ishino	Japan	165.036	40,28 (10)	4.09,26 (7)	1.59,07 (6)	7.15,23 (7)
6	Barbara de Loor	Netherlands	165.694	40,03 (7)	4.09,96 (8)	1.59,16 (7)	7.22,84 (10)
7	Gretha Smit	Netherlands	166.017	42,18 (24)	4.05,25 (2)	2.02,02 (16)	7.02,89 (1)
8	Daniela Anschütz	Germany	166.221	40,30 (11)	4.11,99 (9)	2.00,76 (12)	7.16,70 (8)
9	Maki Tabata	Japan	166.241	40,30 (11)	4.12,71 (11)	1.59,66 (8)	7.19,37 (9)
10	Clara Hughes	Canada	166.453	42,07 (23)	4.07,16 (4)	2.01,68 (15)	7.06,30 (3)
11	Olga Tarasova	Russia	166.833	40,67 (14)	4.12,75 (12)	1.58,83 (5)	7.24,28 (12)
12	Catherine Raney	United States	166.880	41,28 (20)	4.12,09 (10)	2.00,67 (10)	7.13,62 (6)
NQ13	Anni Friesinger	Germany	119.560	38,89 (2)	4.07,56 (5)	1.58,23 (4)	
NQ14	Wang Fei	China	122.881	39,81 (4)	4.16,97 (19)	2.00,73 (11)	
NQ15	Nicola Mayr	Italy	123.141	39,85 (5)	4.15,05 (16)	2.02,35 (18)	
NQ16	Varvara Barysheva	Russia	123.159	40,20 (8)	4.15,34 (18)	2.01,21 (14)	
NQ17	Kristina Groves	Canada	123.584	40,75 (15)	4.15,25 (17)	2.00,88 (13)	
NQ18	Lucille Opitz	Germany	124.092	41,09 (19)	4.13,30 (13)	2.02,36 (19)	
NQ19	Galina Likhachova	Russia	124.686	40,99 (17)	4.18,02 (20)	2.02,08 (17)	
NQ20	Eriko Seo	Japan	124.889	41,08 (18)	4.13,82 (15)	2.04,52 (23)	
NQ21	Hedvig Bjelkevik	Norway	125.299	40,90 (16)	4.19,88 (21)	2.03,26 (21)	
NQ22	Sarah Elliott	United States	125.658	40,35 (13)	4.24,51 (23)	2.03,67 (22)	
NQ23	Maria Lamb	United States	126.571	41,45 (21)	4.24,59 (24)	2.03,07 (20)	
NQ24	Tara Risling	Canada	126.806	41,61 (22)	4.21,92 (22)	2.04,63 (24)	

NQ = Not qualified for the 5000 m (only the best 12 are qualified)
DQ = disqualified

== Rules ==
All 24 participating skaters are allowed to skate the first three distances; 12 skaters may take part on the fourth distance. These 12 skaters are determined by taking the standings on the longest of the first three distances, as well as the samalog standings after three distances, and comparing these lists as follows:

1. Skaters among the top 12 on both lists are qualified.
2. To make up a total of 12, skaters are then added in order of their best rank on either list. Samalog standings take precedence over the longest-distance standings in the event of a tie.
