= Speed skating at the 2002 Winter Olympics – Women's 1500 metres =

Women's 1500 metres at the XIX Olympic Winter Games
- Venue: Utah Olympic Oval, Kearns, Utah
- Dates: February 20, 2002
- Competitors: 39 from 17 nations
- Winning time: 1:54.02 WR

Medalists
1st place, gold medalist(s)		Anni Friesinger; Germany
2nd place, silver medalist(s)		Sabine Völker; Germany
3rd place, bronze medalist(s)		Jennifer Rodriguez; United States

The women's 1500 m speed skating competition for the 2002 Winter Olympics was held in Salt Lake City, Utah, United States.

Anni Friesinger came to terms with the pressure of being the favorite by skating a world record and winning the gold medal. Sabine Völker and Jennifer Rodriguez repeated their successes from the 1000 m.

== Records ==
Prior to this competition, the existing world and Olympic records were as follows.

World record	Anni Friesinger (GER)	1:54.38	Calgary, Canada	4 March 2001
Olympic record	Marianne Timmer (NED)	1:57.58	Nagano, Japan	16 February 1998

The following new world and Olympic records were set during this competition.

Date	Round	Athlete	Country	Time	OR	WR
20 February	Pair 9	Varvara Barysheva	Russia	1:56.44	OR	
20 February	Pair 10	Chris Witty	United States	1:55.71	OR	
20 February	Pair 17	Anni Friesinger	Germany	1:54.02	OR	WR

== Results ==
Rank	Pair	Name	Country	Time	Behind	Notes
1st place, gold medalist(s)	17	Anni Friesinger	Germany	1:54.02	-	WR
2nd place, silver medalist(s)	19	Sabine Völker	Germany	1:54.97	+0.95	
3rd place, bronze medalist(s)	20	Jennifer Rodriguez	United States	1:55.32	+1.30	
4	10	Cindy Klassen	Canada	1:55.59	+1.57	
5	18	Chris Witty	United States	1:55.71	+1.69	
6	15	Claudia Pechstein	Germany	1:55.93	+1.91	
7	13	Tonny de Jong	Netherlands	1:56.02	+2.00	
8	19	Amy Sannes	United States	1:56.29	+2.27	
9	9	Maki Tabata	Japan	1:56.35	+2.33	
10	9	Varvara Barysheva	Russia	1:56.44	+2.42	
11	18	Annamarie Thomas	Netherlands	1:56.45	+2.43	
12	9	Emese Hunyady	Austria	1:56.51	+2.49	
13	14	Becky Sundstrom	United States	1:57.33	+3.31	
14	17	Aki Tonoike	Japan	1:57.97	+3.95	
15	15	Song Li	China	1:58.31	+4.29	
16	13	Chiara Simionato	Italy	1:58.52	+4.50	
17	14	Tatyana Trapeznikova	Russia	1:59.00	+4.98	
18	5	Valentina Yakshina	Russia	1:59.28	+5.26	
19	3	Gao Yang	China	1:59.51	+5.49	
20	10	Kristina Groves	Canada	1:59.54	+5.52	
21	11	Marianne Timmer	Netherlands	1:59.60	+5.58	
22	16	Marion Wohlrab	Germany	1:59.67	+5.65	
23	6	Krisztina Egyed	Hungary	1:59.86	+5.84	
24	12	Yayoi Nagaoka	Japan	1:59.93	+5.91	
25	12	Cindy Overland	Canada	2:00.02	+6.00	
26	2	Katarzyna Wójcicka	Poland	2:00.59	+6.57	
27	4	Nicola Mayr	Italy	2:00.73	+6.71	
28	2	Zhang Xiaolei	China	2:01.23	+7.21	
29	8	Yuri Obara	Japan	2:01.39	+7.37	
29	11	Choi Yun-suk	South Korea	2:01.39	+7.37	
31	7	Andrea Jakab	Romania	2:02.23	+8.21	
32	6	Anzhelika Gavrilova	Kazakhstan	2:03.22	+9.20	
33	8	Baek Eun-bi	South Korea	2:03.87	+9.85	
34	1	Svetlana Chepelnikova	Belarus	2:04.06	+10.04	
35	4	Ilonda Luse	Latvia	2:04.25	+10.23	
36	3	Daniela Oltean	Romania	2:04.48	+10.46	
37	7	Marina Pupina	Kazakhstan	2:05.13	+11.11	
38	5	Yelena Myagkikh	Ukraine	2:05.32	+11.30	
-	16	Renate Groenewold	Netherlands	DNF	-	
