= Speed skating at the 2002 Winter Olympics – Women's 3000 metres =

Women's 3000 metres at the XIX Olympic Winter Games
- Pictogram for speed skating
- Venue: Utah Olympic Oval
- Dates: February 10, 2002
- Competitors: 32 from 16 nations
- Winning time: 3:57.70 WR

Medalists
1st place, gold medalist(s)		Claudia Pechstein; Germany
2nd place, silver medalist(s)		Renate Groenewold; Netherlands
3rd place, bronze medalist(s)		Cindy Klassen; Canada

The women's 3000 m speed skating competition for the 2002 Winter Olympics was held in Salt Lake City, Utah, United States.

Claudia Pechstein won the gold medal at the distance after winning two bronzes and a silver medal in previous Olympics. Favorite Anni Friesinger finished fourth, while all medalists broke the former world record.

== Records ==
Prior to this competition, the existing world and Olympic records were as follows.

World record	Claudia Pechstein (GER)	3:59.26	Calgary, Canada	2 March 2001
Olympic record	Gunda Niemann-Stirnemann (GER)	4:07.29	Nagano, Japan	11 February 1998

The following new world and Olympic records were set during this competition.

Date	Round	Athlete	Country	Time	OR	WR
10 February	Pair 6	Emese Hunyady	Austria	4:06.55	OR	
10 February	Pair 10	Kristina Groves	Canada	4:06.44	OR	
10 February	Pair 13	Anni Friesinger	Germany	3:59.39	OR	
10 February	Pair 15	Claudia Pechstein	Germany	3:57.70	OR	WR

== Results ==
Rank	Pair	Name	Country	Time	Behind	Notes
1st place, gold medalist(s)	15	Claudia Pechstein	Germany	3:57.70	-	WR
2nd place, silver medalist(s)	16	Renate Groenewold	Netherlands	3:58.94	+1.24	
3rd place, bronze medalist(s)	15	Cindy Klassen	Canada	3:58.97	+1.27	
4	13	Anni Friesinger	Germany	3:59.39	+1.69	
5	14	Tonny de Jong	Netherlands	4:00.49	+2.79	
6	14	Maki Tabata	Japan	4:03.63	+5.93	
7	13	Jennifer Rodriguez	United States	4:04.99	+7.29	
8	10	Kristina Groves	Canada	4:06.44	+8.74	
9	6	Emese Hunyady	Austria	4:06.55	+8.85	
10	7	Clara Hughes	Canada	4:06.57	+8.87	
11	10	Gretha Smit	Netherlands	4:07.41	+9.71	
12	7	Daniela Anschütz	Germany	4:07.55	+9.85	
13	8	Catherine Raney	United States	4:07.59	+9.89	
14	9	Varvara Barysheva	Russia	4:08.02	+10.32	
15	16	Tatyana Trapeznikova	Russia	4:08.49	+10.79	
16	5	Lyudmila Prokasheva	Kazakhstan	4:09.74	+12.04	
17	12	Valentina Yakshina	Russia	4:11.48	+13.78	
18	11	Nami Nemoto	Japan	4:11.92	+14.22	
19	12	Eriko Seo	Japan	4:12.33	+14.63	
20	9	Gao Yang	China	4:12.39	+14.69	
21	13	Annie Driscoll	United States	4:15.61	+17.91	
22	13	Nicola Mayr	Italy	4:15.79	+18.09	
23	13	Zhang Xiaolei	China	4:16.53	+18.83	
24	13	Andrea Jakab	Romania	4:17.03	+19.33	
25	13	Bak Eun-Bi	South Korea	4:18.15	+20.45	
26	13	Katarzyna Wójcicka	Poland	4:19.10	+21.40	
27	13	Marina Pupina	Kazakhstan	4:20.04	+22.34	
28	13	Anzhelika Gavrilova	Kazakhstan	4:20.36	+22.66	
29	13	Daniela Oltean	Romania	4:21.73	+24.03	
30	13	Ilonda Luse	Latvia	4:23.13	+25.43	
31	13	Yelena Myagkikh	Ukraine	4:24.64	+26.94	
32	13	Svetlana Chepelnikova	Belarus	4:24.96	+27.26	
