= List of Romanian records in speed skating =

The following are the national records in speed skating in Romania maintained by the Romanian Skating Federation.

== Men ==
Event	Record	Athlete	Date	Meet	Place	Ref
500 meters	35.35	Gabriel Nițu	16 November 2025	World Cup	Salt Lake City, United States	
500 meters × 2						
1000 meters	1:10.79	Marius Paraschivoiu	13 December 2009	World Cup	Salt Lake City, United States	
1500 meters	1:50.39	Adrian Fierar	22 November 2025	World Cup	Calgary, Canada	
3000 meters	3:49.97	Adrian Fierar	8 November 2025	Frillensee Cup	Inzell, Germany	
5000 meters	6:30.12	Adrian Fierar	21 November 2025	World Cup	Calgary, Canada	
10000 meters	13:33.59	Adrian Fierar	26 October 2024	Invitation Race	Inzell, Germany	
Team sprint (3 laps)	1:26.18	Cosmin Nedelea; Gabriel Nitu; Nicolae Mihalache	4 February 2023	Neo-Senior World Cup	Inzell, Germany	
Team pursuit (8 laps)	3:52.83					
Sprint combination						
Small combination						
Big combination						

== Women ==
Event	Record	Athlete	Date	Meet	Place	Ref
500 meters	38.37	Mihaela Hogaş	11 December 2021	World Cup	Calgary, Canada	
500 meters × 2	1:19.42	Alexandra Ianculescu	25–26 February 2017	World Sprint Championships	Calgary, Canada	
1000 meters	1:16.19	Mihaela Hogaş	4 December 2021	World Cup	Salt Lake City, United States	
1500 meters	1:59.21	Bianca Anghel	17 November 2007		Calgary, Canada	
3000 meters	4:10.14	Bianca Anghel	16 November 2007		Calgary, Canada	
5000 meters	7:27.14	Daniela Oltean	11 January 2004	European Championships	Heerenveen, Netherlands	
10000 meters						
Team sprint (3 laps)	1:37.85					
Team pursuit (6 laps)	3:09.68					
Sprint combination	159.095 pts	Alexandra Ianculescu	25–26 February 2017	World Sprint Championships	Calgary, Canada	
Mini combination	167.133 pts	Daniela Dumitru			Calgary, Canada	
Small combination	171.145 pts	Daniela Oltean	9–11 January 2004	European Championships	Heerenveen, Netherlands	

== Mixed ==
Event	Record	Athlete	Date	Meet	Place	Ref
Relay	2:56.96	Cosmin Nedelea; Bianca Stănică	28 January 2024	World Cup	Salt Lake City, United States	
