= Speed skating at the 2002 Winter Olympics – Women's 5000 metres =

Women's 5000 metres at the XIX Olympic Winter Games
- Pictogram for speed skating
- Venue: Utah Olympic Oval
- Dates: February 23, 2002
- Competitors: 16 from 7 nations
- Winning time: 6:49.91 WR

Medalists
1st place, gold medalist(s)		Claudia Pechstein; Germany
2nd place, silver medalist(s)		Gretha Smit; Netherlands
3rd place, bronze medalist(s)		Clara Hughes; Canada

The Women's 5000 m speed skating competition for the 2002 Winter Olympics was held in Salt Lake City, Utah, United States.

Claudia Pechstein secures her third gold medal in the distance, having won each of the three times that this distance has been skated by women in the Olympics between 1994 and 2002. With the win, Pechstein also secures at least one medal in four consecutive Winter Games (1992–2002). Clara Hughes and Gretha Smit surprise by ending up on the podium alongside Pechstein. Smit, who broke the world record en route to finishing second, only started competing in long track skating a year before the Games, although she and her sisters had proven almost unbeatable in marathon skating, which is performed in groups.

== Records ==
Prior to this competition, the existing world and Olympic records were as follows.

World record	Gunda Niemann-Stirnemann (GER)	6:52.44	Salt Lake City, United States	March 10, 2001
Olympic record	Claudia Pechstein (GER)	6:59.61	Nagano, Japan	February 20, 2002

The following new world and Olympic records were set during this competition.

Date	Round	Athlete	Country	Time	OR	WR
23 February 2002	Pair 1	Gretha Smit	Netherlands	6:49.22	OR	WR
23 February 2002	Pair 7	Claudia Pechstein	Germany	6:46.91	OR	WR

== Results ==
Rank	Pair	Lane	Name	Country	Time	Behind	Notes
1st place, gold medalist(s)	7	O	Claudia Pechstein	Germany	6:46.91	-	WR
2nd place, silver medalist(s)	1	I	Gretha Smit	Netherlands	6:49.22	+2.31	
3rd place, bronze medalist(s)	6	O	Clara Hughes	Canada	6:53.53	+6.62	
4	5	I	Cindy Klassen	Canada	6:55.89	+8.98	
5	2	O	Varvara Barysheva	Russia	6:56.97	+10.06	
6	8	I	Anni Friesinger	Germany	6:58.39	+11.48	
7	8	O	Tonny de Jong	Netherlands	7:01.17	+14.26	
8	7	I	Maki Tabata	Japan	7:06.32	+19.41	
9	3	I	Catherine Raney	United States	7:06.89	+19.98	
10	3	O	Kristina Groves	Canada	7:07.16	+20.25	
11	5	O	Valentina Yakshina	Russia	7:08.42	+21.51	
12	6	I	Daniela Anschütz	Germany	7:10.17	+23.26	
13	4	I	Marja Vis	Netherlands	7:19.08	+32.17	
14	2	I	Annie Driscoll	United States	7:35.23	+48.32	
-	1	O	Lyudmila Prokasheva	Kazakhstan	DNF	-	
-	4	O	Nami Nemoto	Japan	DNF	-	
