= Speed skating at the 2002 Winter Olympics – Men's 1000 metres =

Speed skating at the Olympics

Men's 1000 metres at the XIX Olympic Winter Games
- Venue: Utah Olympic Oval
- Dates: February 16, 2002
- Competitors: 44 from 18 nations
- Winning time: 1:07.18 WR

Medalists
1st place, gold medalist(s)		Gerard van Velde; Netherlands
2nd place, silver medalist(s)		Jan Bos; Netherlands
3rd place, bronze medalist(s)		Joey Cheek; United States

The men's 1000 m speed skating competition for the 2002 Winter Olympics was held in Salt Lake City, Utah, United States. Gerard van Velde, who had finished 4th in the Olympics twice already, delivered a surprise by skating a world record and winning the gold medal.

== Records ==
Prior to this competition, the existing world and Olympic records were as follows.

World record	Jeremy Wotherspoon (CAN)	1:07.72	Salt Lake City, United States	December 1, 2001
Olympic record	Ids Postma (NED)	1:10.64	Nagano, Japan	February 15, 1998

The following new world and Olympic records were set during this competition.

Date	Round	Athlete	Country	Time	OR	WR
February 16	Pair 1	Kim Chul-soo	South Korea	1:09.79	OR	
February 16	Pair 2	Ids Postma	Netherlands	1:09.15	OR	
February 16	Pair 14	Choi Jae-bong	South Korea	1:08.81	OR	
February 16	Pair 15	Gerard van Velde	Netherlands	1:07.18	OR	WR

== Results ==
Rank	Pair	Name	Country	Time	Time behind	Notes
1st place, gold medalist(s)	15	Gerard van Velde	Netherlands	1:07.18	–	WR
2nd place, silver medalist(s)	19	Jan Bos	Netherlands	1:07.53	+0.35	
3rd place, bronze medalist(s)	20	Joey Cheek	United States	1:07.61	+0.43	
4	17	Kip Carpenter	United States	1:07.89	+0.71	
5	22	Erben Wennemars	Netherlands	1:07.95	+0.77	
6	18	Nick Pearson	United States	1:07.97	+0.79	
7	19	Casey FitzRandolph	United States	1:08.15	+0.97	
8	16	Lee Kyou-hyuk	South Korea	1:08.37	+1.19	
9	15	Sergey Klevchenya	Russia	1:08.41	+1.23	
10	16	Janne Hänninen	Finland	1:08.45	+1.27	
11	21	Ådne Søndrål	Norway	1:08.64	+1.46	
12	14	Choi Jae-bong	South Korea	1:08.81	+1.63	
13	22	Jeremy Wotherspoon	Canada	1:08.82	+1.64	
14	21	Mike Ireland	Canada	1:08.88	+1.70	
15	18	Yusuke Imai	Japan	1:08.90	+1.72	
16	20	Toyoki Takeda	Japan	1:08.95	+1.77	
17	2	Ids Postma	Netherlands	1:09.15	+1.97	
18	12	Dmitry Lobkov	Russia	1:09.20	+2.02	
19	11	Pat Bouchard	Canada	1:09.21	+2.03	
20	13	Kevin Marshall	Canada	1:09.26	+2.08	
21	13	Tomasz Swist	Poland	1:09.48	+2.30	
22	14	Manabu Horii	Japan	1:09.50	+2.32	
23	4	Yevgeny Lalenkov	Russia	1:09.55	+2.37	
24	17	Michael Kuenzel	Germany	1:09.64	+2.46	
25	1	Kim Chul-soo	South Korea	1:09.79	+2.61	
26	6	Davide Carta	Italy	1:09.81	+2.63	
27	1	Sergey Tsybenko	Kazakhstan	1:10.13	+2.95	
28	11	Petter Andersen	Norway	1:10.14	+2.96	
29	10	Pawel Abratkiewicz	Poland	1:10.21	+3.03	
30	5	Christian Breuer	Germany	1:10.38	+3.20	
31	6	Zsolt Balo	Hungary	1:10.57	+3.39	
32	4	Park Jae-man	South Korea	1:10.67	+3.49	
33	7	Risto Rosendahl	Finland	1:10.70	+3.52	
34	2	Jan Friesinger	Germany	1:10.71	+3.53	
35	3	Li Yu	China	1:10.78	+3.60	
36	5	Dino Gillarduzzi	Italy	1:10.96	+3.78	
37	8	Andrey Fomin	Ukraine	1:11.04	+3.86	
38	3	Cedric Kuentz	France	1:11.26	+4.08	
39	10	Grunde Njos	Norway	1:11.31	+4.13	
40	7	Yu Fengtong	China	1:12.07	+4.89	
41	9	Igor Makovetsky	Belarus	1:12.33	+5.15	
42	8	Aleksey Khatylyov	Belarus	1:13.73	+6.55	
43	9	David Kramar	Czech Republic	1:14.05	+6.87	
44	12	Hiroyuki Noake	Japan	1:49.18	+42.00	
