= Speed skating at the 2002 Winter Olympics – Men's 10,000 metres =

Speed skating at the Olympics

Men's 10,000 metres at the XIX Olympic Winter Games
- Pictogram for speed skating
- Venue: Utah Olympic Oval
- Dates: February 22, 2002
- Competitors: 16 from 10 nations
- Winning time: 12:58.92 WR

Medalists
1st place, gold medalist(s)		Jochem Uytdehaage; Netherlands
2nd place, silver medalist(s)		Gianni Romme; Netherlands
3rd place, bronze medalist(s)		Lasse Sætre; Norway

The men's 10,000 m speed skating competition for the 2002 Winter Olympics was held in Salt Lake City, Utah, United States. Two-time gold medal winner Gianni Romme won a silver in the 10,000 m, while Jochem Uytdehaage wins with a world record time, becoming the first man to break the 13-minute barrier.

== Records ==
Prior to this competition, the existing world and Olympic records were as follows.

World record	Gianni Romme (NED)	13:03.40	Heerenveen, Netherlands	January 26, 2000
Olympic record	Gianni Romme (NED)	13:15.33	Nagano, Japan	February 17, 1998

The following new world and Olympic records were set during this competition.

Date	Round	Athlete	Country	Time	OR	WR
22 February	Pair 2	Gianni Romme	Netherlands	13:10.03	OR	
22 February	Pair 4	Jochem Uytdehaage	Netherlands	12:58.92	OR	WR

== Results ==
Rank	Pair	Lane	Name	Country	Time	Time Behind	Notes
1st place, gold medalist(s)	4	I	Jochem Uytdehaage	Netherlands	12:58.92	-	WR
2nd place, silver medalist(s)	2	I	Gianni Romme	Netherlands	13:10.03	+11.11	
3rd place, bronze medalist(s)	8	O	Lasse Sætre	Norway	13:16.92	+18.00	
4	5	I	Keiji Shirahata	Japan	13:20.40	+21.48	
5	7	O	Jens Boden	Germany	13:23.43	+24.51	
6	1	I	Dmitry Shepel	Russia	13:23.83	+24.91	
7	1	O	Roberto Sighel	Italy	13:26.19	+27.27	
8	7	I	Kjell Storelid	Norway	13:27.24	+28.32	
9	3	O	Bart Veldkamp	Belgium	13:27.48	+28.56	
10	8	I	Frank Dittrich	Germany	13:28.73	+29.81	
11	6	I	Toshihiko Itokawa	Japan	13:31.96	+33.04	
12	3	I	Jason Hedstrand	United States	13:32.99	+34.07	
13	4	O	Derek Parra	United States	13:33.44	+34.52	
14	5	O	Pawel Zygmunt	Poland	13:35.50	+36.58	
15	6	O	Bob de Jong	Netherlands	13:48.93	+50.01	
16	2	O	Dustin Molicki	Canada	13:54.49	+55.57	
