= Speed skating at the 2002 Winter Olympics – Women's 1000 metres =

Women's 1000 metres at the XIX Olympic Winter Games
- Pictogram for speed skating
- Venue: Utah Olympic Oval
- Dates: February 17, 2002
- Competitors: 35 from 14 nations
- Winning time: 1:13.83 WR

Medalists
| 1st place, gold medalist(s) | | Chris Witty; United States |
| 2nd place, silver medalist(s) | | Sabine Völker; Germany |
| 3rd place, bronze medalist(s) | | Jennifer Rodriguez; United States |

The women's 1000 m speed skating competition for the 2002 Winter Olympics was held in Salt Lake City, Utah, United States.

After suffering from mononucleosis, Chris Witty skated a new world record to a surprise win. Jennifer Rodriguez became the first US Hispanic woman to win an Olympic speed skating medal.

== Records ==
Prior to this competition, the existing world and Olympic records were as follows.

| World record | Sabine Völker (GER) | 1:14.06 | Salt Lake City, United States | 1 December 2001 |
| Olympic record | Marianne Timmer (NED) | 1:16.51 | Nagano, Japan | 19 February 1998 |

The following new world and Olympic records were set during this competition.

| Date | Round | Athlete | Country | Time | OR | WR |
|---|---|---|---|---|---|---|
| 17 February | Pair 6 | Varvara Barysheva | Russia | 1:16.49 | OR | |
| 17 February | Pair 7 | Anzhelika Kotyuga | Belarus | 1:15.03 | OR | |
| 17 February | Pair 11 | Marianne Timmer | Netherlands | 1:14.45 | OR | |
| 17 February | Pair 15 | Chris Witty | United States | 1:13.83 | OR | WR |

== Results ==
| Rank | Pair | Name | Country | Time | Behind | Notes |
|---|---|---|---|---|---|---|
| 1st place, gold medalist(s) | 15 | Chris Witty | United States | 1:13.83 | - | WR |
| 2nd place, silver medalist(s) | 17 | Sabine Völker | Germany | 1:13.96 | +0.13 | |
| 3rd place, bronze medalist(s) | 16 | Jennifer Rodriguez | United States | 1:14.24 | +0.41 | |
| 4 | 11 | Marianne Timmer | Netherlands | 1:14.45 | +0.62 | |
| 5 | 16 | Anni Friesinger | Germany | 1:14.47 | +0.64 | |
| 6 | 18 | Monique Garbrecht-Enfeldt | Germany | 1:14.60 | +0.77 | |
| 7 | 17 | Aki Tonoike | Japan | 1:14.64 | +0.81 | |
| 8 | 13 | Andrea Nuyt | Netherlands | 1:14.65 | +0.82 | |
| 9 | 15 | Catriona Le May Doan | Canada | 1:14.72 | +0.89 | |
| 10 | 12 | Chiara Simionato | Italy | 1:14.86 | +1.03 | |
| 11 | 18 | Svetlana Zhurova | Russia | 1:15.02 | +1.19 | |
| 12 | 7 | Anzhelika Kotyuga | Belarus | 1:15.03 | +1.20 | |
| 13 | 14 | Cindy Klassen | Canada | 1:15.08 | +1.25 | |
| 14 | 11 | Amy Sannes | United States | 1:15.09 | +1.26 | |
| 15 | 12 | Annamarie Thomas | Netherlands | 1:15.20 | +1.37 | |
| 16 | 9 | Becky Sundstrom | United States | 1:15.88 | +2.05 | |
| 17 | 13 | Eriko Sanmiya | Japan | 1:16.26 | +2.43 | |
| 18 | 8 | Marieke Wijsman | Netherlands | 1:16.48 | +2.65 | |
| 18 | 8 | Sayuri Osuga | Japan | 1:16.48 | +2.65 | |
| 20 | 6 | Varvara Barysheva | Russia | 1:16.49 | +2.66 | |
| 21 | 9 | Marion Wohlrab | Germany | 1:16.51 | +2.68 | |
| 22 | 3 | Song Li | China | 1:16.71 | +2.88 | |
| 23 | 10 | Svetlana Kaykan | Russia | 1:16.93 | +3.10 | |
| 24 | 4 | Krisztina Egyed | Hungary | 1:17.11 | +3.28 | |
| 25 | 7 | Jin Hua | China | 1:17.35 | +3.52 | |
| 26 | 10 | Wang Manli | China | 1:17.37 | +3.54 | |
| 27 | 6 | Susan Auch | Canada | 1:17.89 | +4.06 | |
| 28 | 1 | Lyudmila Prokasheva | Kazakhstan | 1:18.19 | +4.36 | |
| 29 | 5 | Cho Seon-yeon | South Korea | 1:18.36 | +4.53 | |
| 30 | 2 | You Yanchun | China | 1:18.74 | +4.91 | |
| 31 | 2 | Lee Yong-joo | South Korea | 1:18.79 | +4.96 | |
| 32 | 1 | Choi Seung-yong | South Korea | 1:18.88 | +5.05 | |
| 33 | 3 | Svetlana Radkevich | Belarus | 1:18.93 | +5.10 | |
| 34 | 5 | Andrea Jakab | Romania | 1:19.60 | +5.77 | |
| 35 | 4 | Yelena Myagkikh | Ukraine | 1:20.13 | +6.30 | |
| - | 14 | Maki Tabata | Japan | DQ | - | |
