= Szabolcs Szollosi =

Szabolcs Szollosi may refer to:

- Szabolcs Szöllősi (born 1989), Hungarian handballer
- Szabolcs Szőllősi (born 1986), Hungarian speed skater
