= Kim Chul-soo =

- Hangul: 김철수
- RR: Gim Cheolsu
- MR: Kim Ch'ŏlsu

Kim Chul-soo may refer to:

- Kim Chul-soo (footballer) (born 1952), South Korean footballer
- Kim Chul-soo (speed skater) (born 1980), South Korean speed skater
- Kim Chol-su (born 1982), North Korean judoka
