= Netherlands at the 2002 Winter Olympics =

- Flag of the Netherlands
- IOC code: NED
- NOC: Dutch Olympic Committee*; Dutch Sports Federation
- Website: www.nocnsf.nl (in Dutch)

in Salt Lake City
- Competitors: 27 (14 men, 13 women) in 4 sports
- Flag bearer (opening): Nicolien Sauerbreij (snowboarding)
- Flag bearer (closing): Gerard van Velde (speed skating)
- Medals Ranked 9th: Gold 3 Silver 5 Bronze 0 Total 8

Winter Olympics appearances (overview)
- 1928; 1932; 1936; 1948; 1952; 1956; 1960; 1964; 1968; 1972; 1976; 1980; 1984; 1988; 1992; 1994; 1998; 2002; 2006; 2010; 2014; 2018; 2022; 2026

Athletes from the Netherlands competed at the 2002 Winter Olympics in Salt Lake City, United States.

== Medalists ==
Medal	Name	Sport	Event
Gold	Jochem Uytdehaage	Speed skating	Men's 10,000 metres
Gold	Gerard van Velde	Speed skating	Men's 1000 metres
Gold	Jochem Uytdehaage	Speed skating	Men's 5000 metres
Silver	Gianni Romme	Speed skating	Men's 10,000 metres
Silver	Jan Bos	Speed skating	Men's 1000 metres
Silver	Jochem Uytdehaage	Speed skating	Men's 1500 metres
Silver	Renate Groenewold	Speed skating	Women's 3000 metres
Silver	Gretha Smit	Speed skating	Women's 5000 metres

== Bobsleigh ==
Men & Women

Event	Athlete	Run 1		Run 2		Run 3		Run 4		Total	
Event	Athlete	Time	Rank	Time	Rank	Time	Rank	Time	Rank	Time	Rank
Two-man	Arend Glas; Marcel Welten	48.26	18	48.23	19	48.26	16	48.33	17	3:13.08	16
Two-woman	Ilse Broeders; Jeanette Pennings	49.70	9	49.67	9					1:39.37	10
Two-woman	Eline Jurg; Nannet Kiemel	49.64	7	49.54	6					1:39.18	6
Four-man	Arend Glas; Edwin van Calker; Timothy Beck; Marcel Welten	47.15	16	47.18	16	47.82	17	48.23	21	3:10.38	17

== Short track speed skating ==
Men

Event	Athlete	Heat		Quarterfinal		Semifinal		Final	
Event	Athlete	Time	Position	Time	Position	Time	Position	Time	Position
500 m	Cees Juffermans	43.253	3	Did not advance					
1000 m	Cees Juffermans	1:29.249	3	Did not advance					
1500 m	Cees Juffermans	2:20.397	2 Q			2:21.726	3 QB	2:27.611	8

== Snowboarding ==
Women

Event	Athlete	Qualification		1st round	Quarterfinals	Semifinals	Finals	
Event	Athlete	Time	Rank	Opposition time	Opposition time	Opposition time	Opposition time	Rank
Women's parallel giant slalom	Nicolien Sauerbreij	44.71	24	Did not advance				

== Speed skating ==
Men

Event	Athlete	Race 1		Race 2		Final	
Event	Athlete	Time	Rank	Time	Rank	Time	Rank
500 m	Jan Bos	35.14	12	34.72	3	69.86	9
500 m	Ids Postma	36.41	29	36.08	32	72.49	27
500 m	Gerard van Velde	34.72	4	34.77	4	69.49	4
500 m	Erben Wennemars	35.00	9	34.89	11	68.89	10
1000 m	Jan Bos					1:07.53	2nd place, silver medalist(s)
1000 m	Ids Postma					1:09.15	17
1000 m	Gerard van Velde					1:07.18 WR	1st place, gold medalist(s)
1000 m	Erben Wennemars					1:07.95	5
1500 m	Jan Bos					1:45.63	7
1500 m	Ids Postma					1:45.41	5
1500 m	Rintje Ritsma					1:45.86	9
1500 m	Jochem Uytdehaage					1:44.57	2nd place, silver medalist(s)
5000 m	Bob de Jong					6:43.97	30
5000 m	Carl Verheijen					6:24.71	6
5000 m	Jochem Uytdehaage					6:14.66 WR	1st place, gold medalist(s)
10,000 m	Bob de Jong					13:48.93	15
10,000 m	Gianni Romme					13:10.03	2nd place, silver medalist(s)
10,000 m	Jochem Uytdehaage					12:58.92 WR	1st place, gold medalist(s)

Women

Event	Athlete	Race 1		Race 2		Final	
Event	Athlete	Time	Rank	Time	Rank	Time	Rank
500 m	Andrea Nuyt	37.54	3	37.83	5	75.37	4
500 m	Marianne Timmer	38.30	13	37.87	7	76.17	8
500 m	Marieke Wijsman	38.31	14	38.79	20	77.10	17
1000 m	Andrea Nuyt					1:14.65	8
1000 m	Annamarie Thomas					1:15.20	15
1000 m	Marianne Timmer					1:14.45	4
1000 m	Marieke Wijsman					1:16.48	18
1500 m	Renate Groenewold					DNF	–
1500 m	Tonny de Jong					1:56.02	7
1500 m	Annamarie Thomas					1:56.45	11
1500 m	Marianne Timmer					1:59.60	21
3000 m	Renate Groenewold					3:58.94	2nd place, silver medalist(s)
3000 m	Tonny de Jong					4:00.49	5
3000 m	Gretha Smit					4:07.41	11
5000 m	Tonny de Jong					7:01.17	7
5000 m	Gretha Smit					6:49.22	2nd place, silver medalist(s)
5000 m	Marja Vis					7:19.08	13
