= David Kramár =

Czech speed skater

Personal information
- Nationality: Czech
- Born: 23 May 1979 (age 45); Nové Město na Moravě, Czechoslovakia

Sport
- Sport: Speed skating

David Kramár (born 23 May 1979) is a Czech former speed skater. He competed in the men's 1000 metres event at the 2002 Winter Olympics.
