= Ruddalens IP =

Sports venue in Gothenburg, Sweden

Coordinates: 57°39′50″N 11°54′34″E

- Interactive map of Ruddalens IP
- Location: Västra Frölunda, Sweden

Tenants
- Västra Frölunda IF, Utsiktens BK, Assyriska BK, BK Skottfint

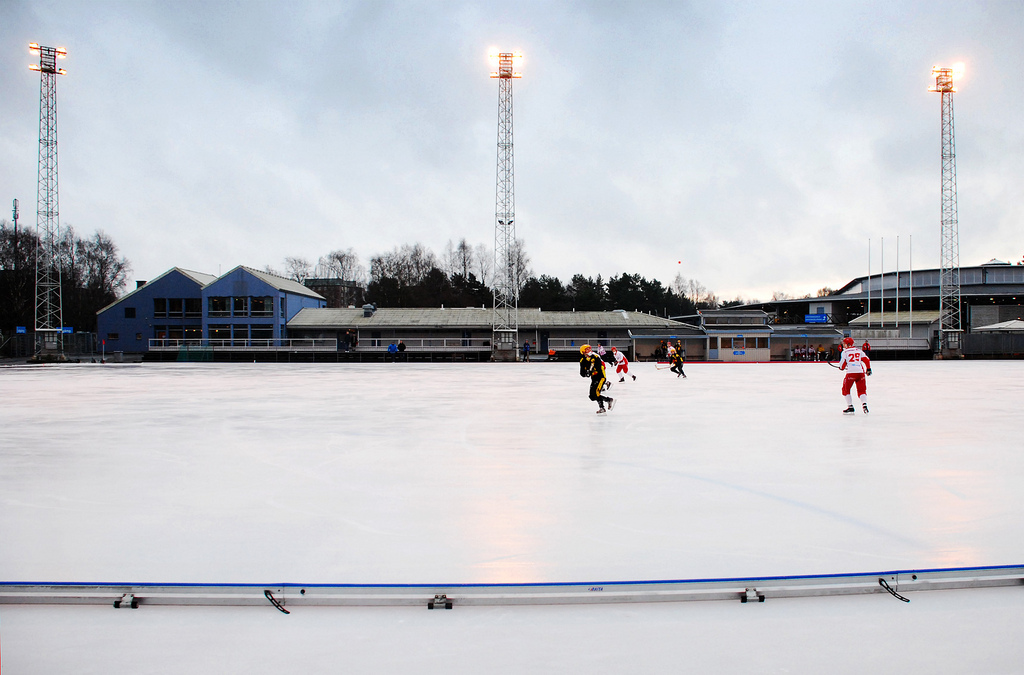
The bandy rink at Ruddalens IP

Ruddalens IP is a sports venue in Västra Frölunda, Gothenburg, Sweden.

It houses a football stadium for the teams Västra Frölunda IF, Utsiktens BK, Assyriska BK and BK Skottfint with a total capacity of 5,000 spectators.

The speed skating venue Rudhallen is the only of its kind in Sweden with the entire facility under one roof. It was the venue for the 2003 World Allround Speed Skating Championships. The indoor speed skating venue is closed for the season 2019/20.

Ruddalens IP also has an outdoor bandy field.
