= Robert Brandt =

Finnish long track speed skater

Robert Brandt (born October 21, 1982, in Helsinki) is a Finnish long track speed skater who participates in international competitions.

== Personal records ==
Personal records
Men's Speed skating
| Event | Result | Date | Location | Notes |
| 500 m | 38.20 | 2007-10-20 | Salt Lake City | |
| 1,000 m | 1:16.34 | 2007-01-20 | Turin | |
| 1,500 m | 1:53.41 | 2008-01-13 | Kolomna | |
| 3,000 m | 3:58.61 | 2003-11-23 | Heerenveen | |
| 5,000 m | 6:37.87 | 2005-11-13 | Calgary | |
| 10,000 m | 13:57.55 | 2005-02-19 | Heerenveen | |

=== Career highlights ===
European Allround Championships
2006 - Hamar, 30th
2008 - Kolomna, 25th
National Championships
2002 - Seinäjoki, (bronze) 3rd at allround
2003 - Seinäjoki, (gold) 1st at 10000 m
2003 - Seinäjoki, (bronze) 3rd at allround
2004 - Helsinki, (silver) 2nd at 5000 m
2004 - Seinäjoki, (gold) 1st at 10000 m
European Youth-23 Games
2004 - Gothenburg, (bronze) 3rd at 10000 m
