= Jason Hedstrand =

American speed skater

Personal information
- Born: September 22, 1975 (age 50) Shoreview, Minnesota United States

Sport
- Sport: Speed skating

Jason Hedstrand (born September 22, 1975) is an American speed skater. He competed in the men's 10,000 metres event at the 2002 Winter Olympics. He broke the American Record for men's 10,000m speedskating, with a time of 13:32.99 putting him in 12th place overall.
