= Jochem Uytdehaage =

Dutch speed skater

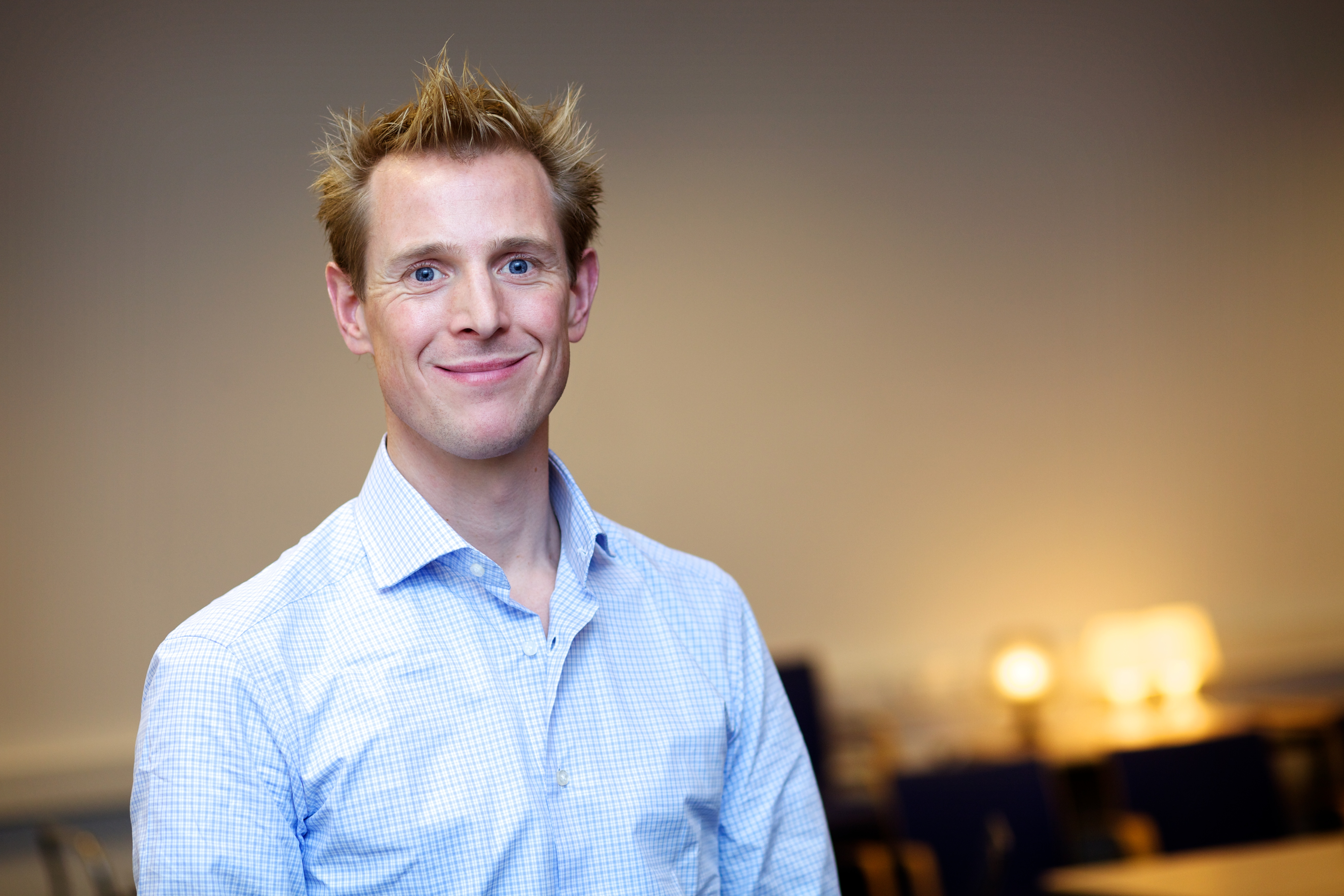

Personal information
- Born: 9 July 1976 (age 49) Utrecht, Netherlands
- Height: 1.73 m (5 ft 8 in)
- Weight: 70 kg (154 lb)
- Website: www.uytdehaage.nl

Sport
- Country: Netherlands
- Sport: Speed skating
- Turned pro: 1996
- Retired: 2007

Achievements and titles
- Personal best(s): 500 m: 36.27 (2005); 1000 m: 1:11.36 (2001); 1500 m: 1:44.57 (2002); 3000 m: 3:43.28 (2001); 5000 m: 6:14.66 (2002); 10 000 m: 12:58.92 (2002)
Medal record
Men's speed skating
Representing the Netherlands
Olympic Games
Gold medal – first place	2002 Salt Lake City	5000 m
Gold medal – first place	2002 Salt Lake City	10,000 m
Silver medal – second place	2002 Salt Lake City	1500 m
World Allround Championships
Gold medal – first place	2002 Heerenveen	Allround
World Single Distance Championships
Gold medal – first place	2003 Berlin	5000 m
European Championships
Gold medal – first place	2002 Erfurt	Allround
Gold medal – first place	2005 Heerenveen	Allround
Bronze medal – third place	2004 Heerenveen	Allround

Jochem Simon Uytdehaage (born 9 July 1976) is a Dutch former long track speed skater who won two Olympic gold medals in Salt Lake City and was the 2002 World Allround champion. He retired in 2007 at the age of 30, following two consecutive seasons of poor results.

== Biography ==
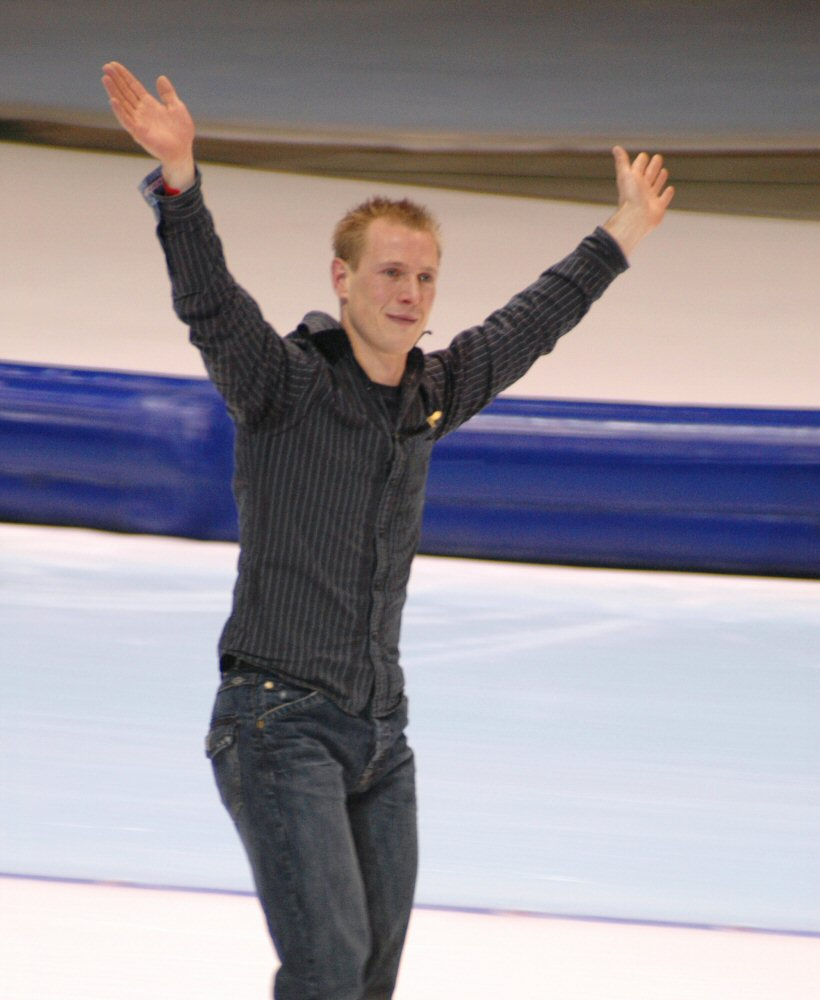
Jochem Uytdehaage on his retirement

Uytdehaage was born on 9 July 1976 in Oog in Al, Utrecht, Netherlands. He was the 2002 European Allround champion. During the 2002 Winter Olympics, he won the gold medal in the 5,000 and 10,000 meter events and the silver in the 1500 meter event. His winning time on the 10,000 meter was 12:58.92, the first time a skater broke the 13-minute barrier on this distance, and this world record stood for three years, until it was broken by Carl Verheijen and Chad Hedrick. His 5,000 meter time of 6:14.66 was also a world record. Uytdehaage led the long track speed skating Adelskalender from 2001 until 13 November 2005, when Chad Hedrick (US) overtook him.

In December 2005, at the Dutch Olympic trials in Heerenveen, Uytdehaage failed to qualify for the 2006 Winter Olympics in Turin.

After retirement he was also a reporter in the AVROTROS program De IJzersterkste in 2019-2020.

== Records ==
=== Personal records ===
Personal records
Men's speed skating
Event	Result	Date	Location	Notes
500 m	36.27	19 November 2005	Utah Olympic Oval, Salt Lake City	
1000 m	1:11.36	24 February 2001	Olympic Oval, Calgary	
1500 m	1:44.57	19 February 2002	Utah Olympic Oval, Salt Lake City	
3000 m	3:43.28	16 March 2001	Olympic Oval, Calgary	
5000 m	6:14.66	9 February 2002	Utah Olympic Oval, Salt Lake City	World record until beaten by Chad Hedrick on 13 November 2005. Olympic record until beaten by Sven Kramer on 13 February 2010.
10000 m	12:58.92	22 February 2002	Utah Olympic Oval, Salt Lake City	World record until beaten by Carl Verheijen on 4 December 2005. Olympic record until beaten by Lee Seung-hoon on 23 February 2010.

=== Olympic records ===
Olympic records
Men's speed skating
Event	Result	Date	Location	Notes
5000 m	6:14.66	9 February 2002	Utah Olympic Oval, Salt Lake City	World record until beaten by Chad Hedrick on 13 November 2005. Olympic record until beaten by Sven Kramer on 13 February 2010.
10000 m	12:58.92	22 February 2002	Utah Olympic Oval, Salt Lake City	World record until beaten by Carl Verheijen on 4 December 2005. Olympic record until beaten by Lee Seung-hoon on 23 February 2010.

=== World records ===
World records
Men's speed skating
Event	Result	Date	Location	Notes
Small comb.	147.655	15–17 March 2001	Olympic Oval, Calgary	World record until beaten by Erben Wennemars on 12–13 August 2005.
5000 m	6:14.66	9 February 2002	Utah Olympic Oval, Salt Lake City	World record until beaten by Chad Hedrick on 13 November 2005. Olympic record until beaten by Sven Kramer on 13 February 2010.
10000 m	12:58.92	22 February 2002	Utah Olympic Oval, Salt Lake City	World record until beaten by Carl Verheijen on 4 December 2005. Olympic record until beaten by Lee Seung-hoon on 23 February 2010.
Big comb.	152.482	15–17 March 2002	Thialf, Heerenveen	World record until beaten by Mark Tuitert on 9–11 January 2004.

== Tournament overview ==
Season	Dutch Championships Single Distances	Dutch Championships Allround	European Championships Allround	Olympic Games	World Cup GWC	World Championships Single Distances	World Championships Allround
1995–96	GRONINGEN 8th 1500m 13th 5000m	THE HAGUE 22nd 500m 11th 5000m 19th 1500m DNQ 10000m NC overall (18th)					
1996–97		ASSEN 20th 500m 17th 5000m 20th 1500m DNQ 10000m NC overall (21st)					
1997–98	HEERENVEEN 17th 1500m 11th 5000m 6th 10000m	DEVENTER 12th 500m 5th 5000m 8th 1500m 4th 10000m (bronze) overall					
1998–99	GRONINGEN 16th 1500m 8th 5000m 5th 10000m	THE HAGUE 7th 500m 4th 5000m 4th 1500m (bronze) 10000m (silver) overall			29th 5000m/10000m		
1999–2000	DEVENTER 9th 1500m 4th 5000m (gold) 10000m	THE HAGUE 7th 500m 4th 5000m 8th 1500m (silver) 10000m 5th overall					
2000–01	THE HAGUE 4th 5000m (bronze) 10000m	HEERENVEEN (bronze) 500m (silver) 5000m 6th 1500m (silver) 10000m (gold) overall	BASELGA di PINÈ 6th 500m 7th 5000m 5th 1500m 4th 10000m 4th overall		34th 1500m 8th 5000m/10000m	SALT LAKE CITY 7th 10000m	BUDAPEST 18th 500m 9th 5000m 8th 1500m 9th 10000m 10th overall
2001–02	GRONINGEN 11th 1500m 5th 5000m		ERFURT 4th 500m (silver) 5000m 5th 1500m 5th 10000m (gold) overall	SALT LAKE CITY (silver) 1500m (gold) 5000m (gold) 10000m	34th 1500m 8th 5000m/10000m		HEERENVEEN 5th 500m (gold) 5000m 4th 1500m (gold) 10000m (gold) overall
2002–03	UTRECHT 7th 1500m 4th 5000m	ASSEN 11th 500m 7th 5000m 9th 1500m 6th 10000m 8th overall			11th 1500m (bronze) 5000m/10000m	BERLIN (gold) 5000m	
2003–04	HEERENVEEN 4th 1500m (silver) 5000m (gold) 10000m	EINDHOVEN 5th 500m (gold) 5000m (bronze) 1500m (gold) 10000m (gold) overall	HEERENVEEN 6th 500m 4th 5000m 4th 1500m 4th 10000m (bronze) overall		12th 1500m 4th 5000m/10000m		HAMAR 12th 500m 8th 5000m DNS 1500m DNS 10000m NC overall
2004–05	ASSEN 13th 1500m 13th 5000m 6th 10000m	HEERENVEEN (silver) 500m 5th 5000m (bronze) 1500m 5th 10000m 4th overall	HEERENVEEN (silver) 500m 5th 5000m (gold) 1500m 5th 10000m (gold) overall		7th 5000m/10000m	INZELL 7th 5000m	MOSCOW 11th 500m 7th 5000m 5th 1500m 6th 10000m 5th overall
2005–06	HEERENVEEN 7th 1500m 6th 5000m		HAMAR 14th 500m 14th 5000m 16th 1500m 12th 10000m 11th overall		22nd 5000m/10000m (bronze) Team pursuit		
2006–07	ASSEN 16th 1500m 9th 5000m 8th 10000m	HEERENVEEN 13th 500m 8th 5000m 17th 1500m 9th 10000m 9th overall					

NC = No classification
DNQ = Did not qualify for the last event

== World Cup ==
Season	1500 meter					
1998–1999						
1999–2000						
2000–2001	–	–	3rd(b)	–	–	
2001–2002	–	–	–	–	– 1st(b)	
2002–2003	7th	9th	16th	4th	–	–
2003–2004	5th	6th	9th			
2004–2005						
2005–2006						

Season	5000 meter/10000 meter							
1998–1999		–	–*	–	9th	–		
1999–2000								
2000–2001	16th	12th*	10th	5th	5th			
2001–2002	6th	9th	2nd place, silver medalist(s)	10th*	8th	10th		
2002–2003	4th	3rd place, bronze medalist(s)	3rd place, bronze medalist(s)	6th*	1st place, gold medalist(s)	1st place, gold medalist(s)		
2003–2004	6th	(silver) *	3rd place, bronze medalist(s)	7th	6th	6th*		
2004–2005	–	–	8th*	2nd place, silver medalist(s)	5th	–*		
2005–2006	–	–	14th*	1st(b)	–	2nd place, silver medalist(s)	1st place, gold medalist(s)	–

Season	Team pursuit		
1998–1999			
1999–2000			
2000–2001			
2001–2002			
2002–2003			
2003–2004			
2004–2005			
2005–2006	2nd place, silver medalist(s)	1st place, gold medalist(s)	–

(b) = Division B
* = 10000 meter
– = Did not participate

== Medals won ==
Championship	Gold (gold)	Silver (silver)	Bronze (bronze)
Dutch Single Distances	2	1	1
Dutch Allround events	2	4	4
Dutch Allround classification	2	1	1
European Allround events	1	2	0
European Allround classification	2	0	1
World Allround events	2	0	0
World Allround classification	1	0	0
Olympic Games	2	1	0
World Cup GWC	4	5	3
World Cup classification	0	0	2
Total	18	14	12

Records
Preceded by (Netherlands) Gianni Romme	Men's 5000 m speed skating world record 9 February 2002 – 13 November 2005	Succeeded by (United States) Chad Hedrick
Preceded by (Netherlands) Gianni Romme	Men's 10000 m speed skating world record 22 February 2002 – 4 December 2005	Succeeded by (Netherlands) Carl Verheijen
Preceded by (Netherlands) Gianni Romme	Men's 5000 m speed skating Olympic record 9 February 2002 – 13 February 2010	Succeeded by (Netherlands) Sven Kramer
Preceded by (Netherlands) Gianni Romme	Men's 10000 m speed skating Olympic record 22 February 2002 – 23 February 2010	Succeeded by (South Korea) Lee Seung-hoon
Preceded by (Netherlands) Erben Wennemars	Men's small combination speed skating world record 17 March 2001 – 13 August 2005	Succeeded by (Netherlands) Erben Wennemars
Preceded by (Netherlands) Rintje Ritsma	Men's big combination speed skating world record 17 March 2002 – 11 January 2004	Succeeded by (Netherlands) Mark Tuitert
Awards
Preceded by (Japan) Hiroyasu Shimizu	Oscar Mathisen Award; 2002	Succeeded by (Germany) Anni Friesinger
Preceded by Erik Dekker	Dutch Sportsman of the Year; 2002	Succeeded by Erben Wennemars
Preceded by Gerard van Velde	Ard Schenk Award; 2002	Succeeded by Erben Wennemars
