= Speed skating at the 2002 Winter Olympics – Women's 500 metres =

Women's 500 metres at the XIX Olympic Winter Games
- Pictogram for speed skating
- Venue: Utah Olympic Oval
- Dates: 13–14 February 2002
- Competitors: 31 from 12 nations
- Winning time: 74.75

Medalists
1st place, gold medalist(s)		Catriona Le May Doan; Canada
2nd place, silver medalist(s)		Monique Garbrecht-Enfeldt; Germany
3rd place, bronze medalist(s)		Sabine Völker; Germany

The Women's 500 m speed skating competition for the 2002 Winter Olympics was held in Salt Lake City, Utah, United States. The competition consisted of two separate 500 metre races, with the competitors ranked by their cumulative time from the two races.

World record holder Catriona Le May Doan retained her Olympic title by beating four-time World Sprint Champion Monique Garbrecht-Enfeldt.

== Records ==
Prior to this competition, the existing world and Olympic records were as follows.

500 meters (1 race)

World record	Catriona Le May Doan (CAN)	37.22	Calgary, Canada	9 December 2001
Olympic record	Catriona Le May Doan (CAN)	38.21	Nagano, Japan	14 February 1998

The following new world and Olympic records were set during this competition.

Date	Round	Athlete	Country	Time	OR	WR
13 February	Race 1	Tomomi Okazaki	Japan	37.77	OR	
13 February	Race 1	Catriona Le May Doan	Canada	37.30	OR	

== Results ==
Rank	Name	Country	Race 1	Race 2	Total	Difference
1st place, gold medalist(s)	Catriona Le May Doan	Canada	37.30 OR	37.45	74.75	-
2nd place, silver medalist(s)	Monique Garbrecht-Enfeldt	Germany	37.34	37.60	74.94	+0.19
3rd place, bronze medalist(s)	Sabine Völker	Germany	37.62	37.57	75.19	+0.44
4	Andrea Nuyt	Netherlands	37.54	37.83	75.37	+0.62
5	Anzhelika Kotyuga	Belarus	37.73	37.66	75.39	+0.64
6	Tomomi Okazaki	Japan	37.77	37.87	75.64	+0.89
7	Svetlana Zhurova	Russia	37.55	38.09	75.64	+0.89
8	Marianne Timmer	Netherlands	38.30	37.87	76.17	+1.42
9	Yukari Watanabe	Japan	37.98	38.22	76.20	+1.45
10	Svetlana Kaykan	Russia	38.05	38.26	76.31	+1.56
11	Eriko Sanimya	Japan	38.25	38.12	76.37	+1.62
12	Sayuri Osuga	Japan	37.82	38.60	76.42	+1.67
13	Wang Manli	China	38.20	38.42	76.62	+1.87
14	Chris Witty	United States	38.37	38.36	76.73	+1.98
15	Jenny Wolf	Germany	38.36	38.37	76.73	+1.98
16	Chiara Simionato	Italy	38.45	38.47	76.92	+2.17
17	Marieke Wijsman	Netherlands	38.31	38.79	77.10	+2.35
18	Choi Seung-yong	South Korea	38.31	38.83	77.14	+2.39
19	Marion Wohlrab	Germany	38.66	38.71	77.37	+2.62
20	Becky Sundstrom	United States	38.89	38.71	77.60	+2.85
21	Susan Auch	Canada	38.84	38.76	77.60	+2.85
22	Elli Ochowicz	United States	38.85	38.86	77.71	+2.96
23	Jin Hua	China	39.06	39.20	78.26	+3.51
24	Yang Chunyuan	China	39.56	39.07	78.63	+3.88
25	Jo Seon-yeon	South Korea	39.31	39.48	78.79	+4.04
26	Emese Hunyady	Austria	39.38	39.51	78.89	+4.14
27	Krisztina Egyed	Hungary	39.47	39.81	79.28	+4.53
28	Svetlana Radkevich	Belarus	39.84	39.61	79.45	+4.70
29	Lee Yong-ju	South Korea	39.72	40.06	79.78	+5.03
30	Xing Aihua	China	104.62	39.74	144.36	+69.61
-	Amy Sannes	United States	38.86	DNF	DNF	-
