= Szabolcs Szőllősi =

Hungarian long track speed skater (born 1986)

Szabolcs Szőllősi (born July 31, 1986) is a Hungarian long track speed skater who participates in international competitions.

== Personal records ==
Personal records
Men's Speed skating
Event	Result	Date	Location	Notes
500 m	36.85	2009-12-11	Salt Lake City	Utah Olympic Oval
1,000 m	1:12.55	2009-12-13	Salt Lake City	Utah Olympic Oval
1,500 m	1:54.81	2007-11-16	Calgary	Olympic Oval
3,000 m	4:11.65	2007-12-28	Berlin	Sportforum Hohenschönhausen
5,000 m	6:57.55	2007-11-17	Calgary	Olympic Oval

=== Career highlights ===
European Allround Championships
2008 - Kolomna, 29th
2009 - Heerenveen, 27th
World Junior Allround Championships
2005 - Seinäjoki, 40th
2006 - Erfurt, 40th
National Championships
2005 - Budapest, (gold) 1st at allround
2005 - Budapest, (gold) 1st at junior
2005 - Budapest, (bronze) 3rd at sprint
2006 - Budapest, (gold) 1st at allround
2006 - Budapest, (gold) 1st at junior
2006 - Budapest, (gold) 1st at sprint
2007 - Budapest, (gold) 1st at allround
2008 - Budapest, (gold) 1st at allround
2008 - Budapest, (gold) 1st at sprint
