= Daniela Oltean =

Romanian speed skater

Personal information
- Born: Daniela Oltean; 24 July 1989 (age 36) Cluj-Napoca, Romania

Sport
- Country: Romania
- Sport: Speed skating
- Turned pro: 1998
- Retired: 2008

Daniela Oltean (born July 24, 1980, in Cluj-Napoca, Cluj County) is a Romanian long track speed skater who participates in international competitions.

== Personal records ==
Personal records
Women's Speed skating
Event	Result	Date	Location	Notes
500 m	41.15	2005-11-20	Salt Lake City	
1,000 m	1:19.53	2005-11-19	Salt Lake City	
1,500 m	2:00.81	2005-11-20	Salt Lake City	
3,000 m	4:10.96	2005-11-18	Salt Lake City	
5,000 m	7:27.14	2004-01-11	Heerenveen	

== Tournament summary ==
Season	Romanian Championships Single Distances	Romanian Championships Allround	European Championships Allround	World Championships Allround	World Championships Sprint	World Championships Single Distances	Olympic Games	World Championships Junior Allround
1997–98								ROSEVILLE 31st 500m 27th 1500m 27th 1000m DNS 3000m NC29 overall
1998–99			HEERENVEEN 23rd 500m 23rd 3000m 19th 1500m DNS 5000m NC23 overall					GEITHUIS 35th 500m 30th 1500m 27th 1000m DNS 3000m NC30 overall
1999–2000		(silver) 500m (gold) 1500m (silver) 1000m (gold) 3000m (silver) Overall	HAMAR 20th 500m 18th 3000m 18th 1500m DNS 5000m NC19 overall					SEINÄJOKI 15th 500m 17th 1500m 16th 1000m 15th 3000m 15th overall
2000–01			BASELGA DI PINÉ 18th 500m 16th 3000m 15th 1500m 11th 5000m 13th overall					
2001–02		(silver) 500m (gold) 1500m (gold) 1000m (gold) 3000m (gold) Overall	ERFURT 23rd 500m 19th 3000m 19th 1500m DNS 5000m NC19 overall				SALT LAKE CITY 36th 1500m 29th 3000m	
2002–03	(Note: The national single distance and allround championships was held as 1 tournament)	(silver) 500m (silver) 1000m (silver) 1500m (silver) 3000m (silver) Overall	HEERENVEEN 19th 500m 17th 3000m 18th 1500m DNS 5000m NC18 overall	GÖTEBORG 24th 500m 24th 3000m 23rd 1500m DNS 5000m NC23 overall		BERLIN 36th 500m 19th 3000m		
2003–04		(bronze) 500m (bronze) 1000m (gold) 1500m (gold) 3000m (gold) Overall	HEERENVEEN 18th 500m 13th 3000m 13th 1500m 13th 5000m 13th overall					
2004–05		(bronze) 500m (bronze) 1000m (bronze) 1500m (bronze) 3000m (bronze) Overall	HEERENVEEN 23rd 500m 23rd 3000m 22nd 1500m DNS 5000m NC23 overall					
2005–06	(gold) 1000m	(gold) 500m (gold) 3000m (gold) 1500m (gold) 5000m (gold) Overall	HAMAR 18th 500m 17th 3000m 29th 1500m DNS 5000m NC25		HEERENVEEN 36th 500m 29th 1000m 31st 500m 28th 1000m 30th overall		TORINO 35th 1000m 35th 1500m 26th 3000m	
2006–2007					HAMAR 31st 500m 30th 1000m 30th 500m 28th 1000m 29th overall			
