= Kim Chul-soo (speed skater) =

South Korean speed skater

Personal information
- Nationality: South Korean
- Born: 20 September 1980 (age 44)

Sport
- Sport: Speed skating

Kim Chul-soo (born 20 September 1980) is a South Korean speed skater. He competed in two events at the 2002 Winter Olympics.
