= Yuri Obara =

Japanese speed skater (born 1980)

Personal information
- Nationality: Japanese
- Born: 10 September 1980 (age 44); Obihiro, Hokkaido, Japan

Sport
- Sport: Speed skating

Yuri Obara (小原 悠里, Obara Yuri, born 10 September 1980) is a Japanese speed skater. She competed in the women's 1500 metres at the 2002 Winter Olympics.
