= Marcel Welten =

Dutch bobsledder

Personal information
- Nationality: Dutch
- Born: 23 June 1969 (age 55); Utrecht, Netherlands

Sport
- Sport: Bobsleigh

Marcel Welten (born 23 June 1969) is a Dutch bobsledder. He competed in the two man and the four man events at the 2002 Winter Olympics.
