= Sabine Völker =

German speed skater

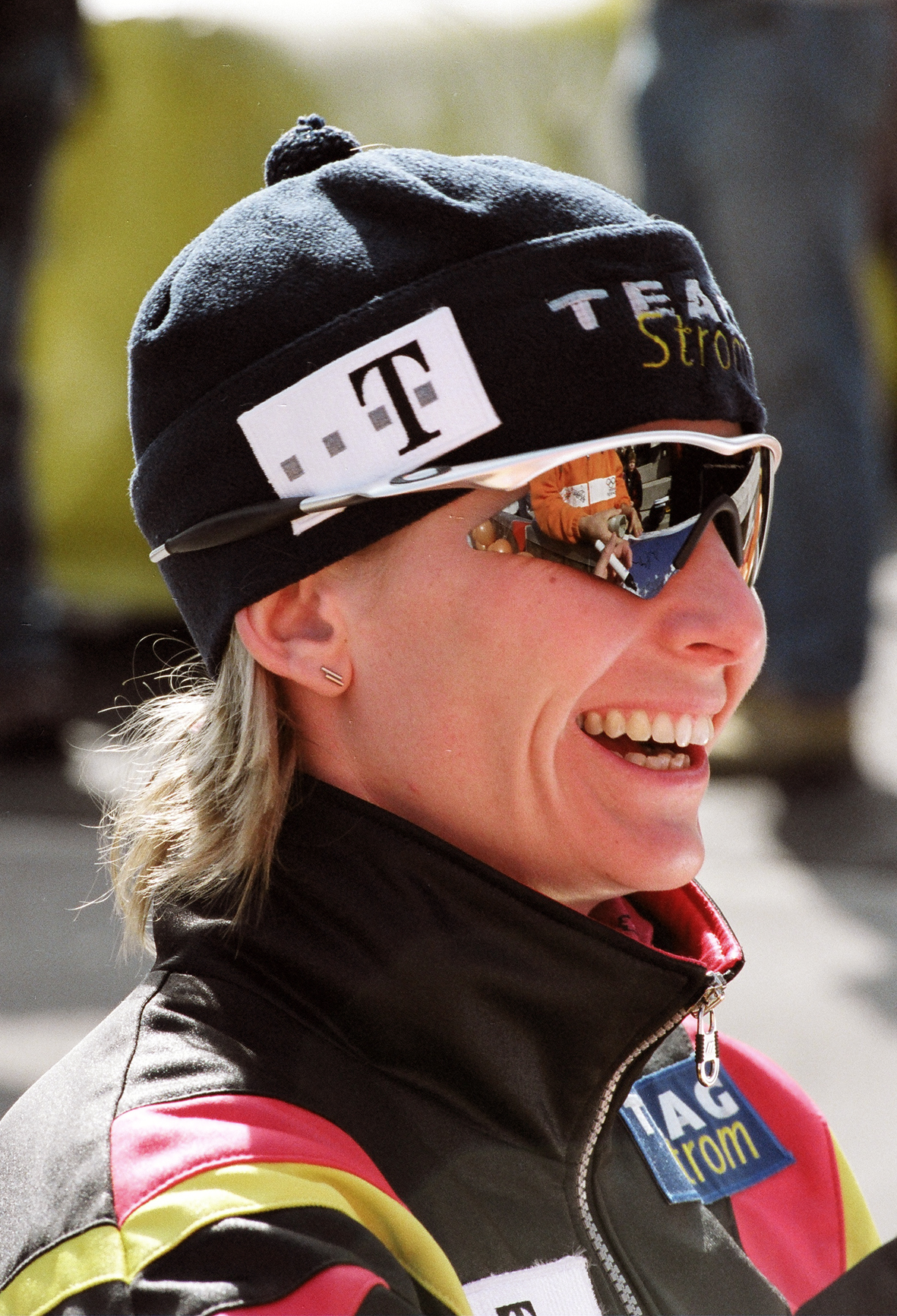

Personal information
- Born: 11 May 1973 (age 53) Erfurt, East Germany

Sport
- Country: Germany
- Sport: Speed skating
Medal record
Representing Germany
World Championships
Gold medal – first place	2006 Turin	Team pursuit
Silver medal – second place	2002 Salt Lake City	1000 m
Silver medal – second place	2002 Salt Lake City	1500 m
Bronze medal – third place	2002 Salt Lake City	2×500 m

Sabine Völker (born 11 May 1973) is a German former speed skater who won a gold medal in the women's team pursuit at the 2006 Winter Olympics, after winning three individual medals at the 2002 Winter Olympics in Salt Lake City.
