= Svetlana Chepelnikova =

Belarusian speed skater (born 1979)

Personal information
- Nationality: Belarusian
- Born: 13 March 1979 (age 46); Vitebsk, Soviet Union

Sport
- Sport: Speed skating

Svetlana Chepelnikova (born 13 March 1979) is a Belarusian speed skater. She competed at the 1998 Winter Olympics and the 2002 Winter Olympics.
