= Bianca Anghel =

Romanian long track speed skater (born 1985)

Bianca Anghel (born July 25, 1985) is a Romanian long track speed skater who participates in international competitions.

== Personal records ==
Personal records
Women's Speed skating
Event	Result	Date	Location	Notes
500 m	40.09	2007-11-16	Calgary	
1,000 m	1:18.37	2007-11-09	Salt Lake City	
1,500 m	1:59.21	2007-11-17	Calgary	
3,000 m	4:10.14	2007-11-16	Calgary	
5,000 m	7:33.57	2004-01-11	Heerenveen	

=== Career highlights ===
World Single Distance Championships
2004 - Seoul, 19th at 1500 m
2004 - Seoul, 17th at 3000 m
European Allround Championships
2003 - Heerenveen, 16th
2004 - Heerenveen, 14th
2005 - Heerenveen, 20th
2008 - Kolomna, 25th
World Junior Allround Championships
2001 - Groningen, 34th
2002 - Collalbo, 24th
2003 - Kushiro, 10th
2004 - Roseville, 5th
2005 - Seinäjoki, 13th
National Championships
2002 - Miercurea Ciuc, (silver) 2nd at allround
2003 - Miercurea Ciuc, (gold) 1st at 1000 m
2003 - Miercurea Ciuc, (gold) 1st at 500 m
2003 - Miercurea Ciuc, (gold) 1st at 1500 m
2003 - Miercurea Ciuc, (gold) 1st at 3000 m
2003 - Miercurea Ciuc, (gold) 1st at allround
2004 - Miercurea Ciuc, (gold) 1st at 1000 m
2004 - Miercurea Ciuc, (gold) 1st at 500 m
2004 - Miercurea Ciuc, (silver) 2nd at 3000 m
2004 - Miercurea Ciuc, (bronze) 3rd at allround
Nordic Junior Games
2004 - Berlin, (silver) 2nd at 1000 m
