= Galina Likhachova =

Russian speed skater

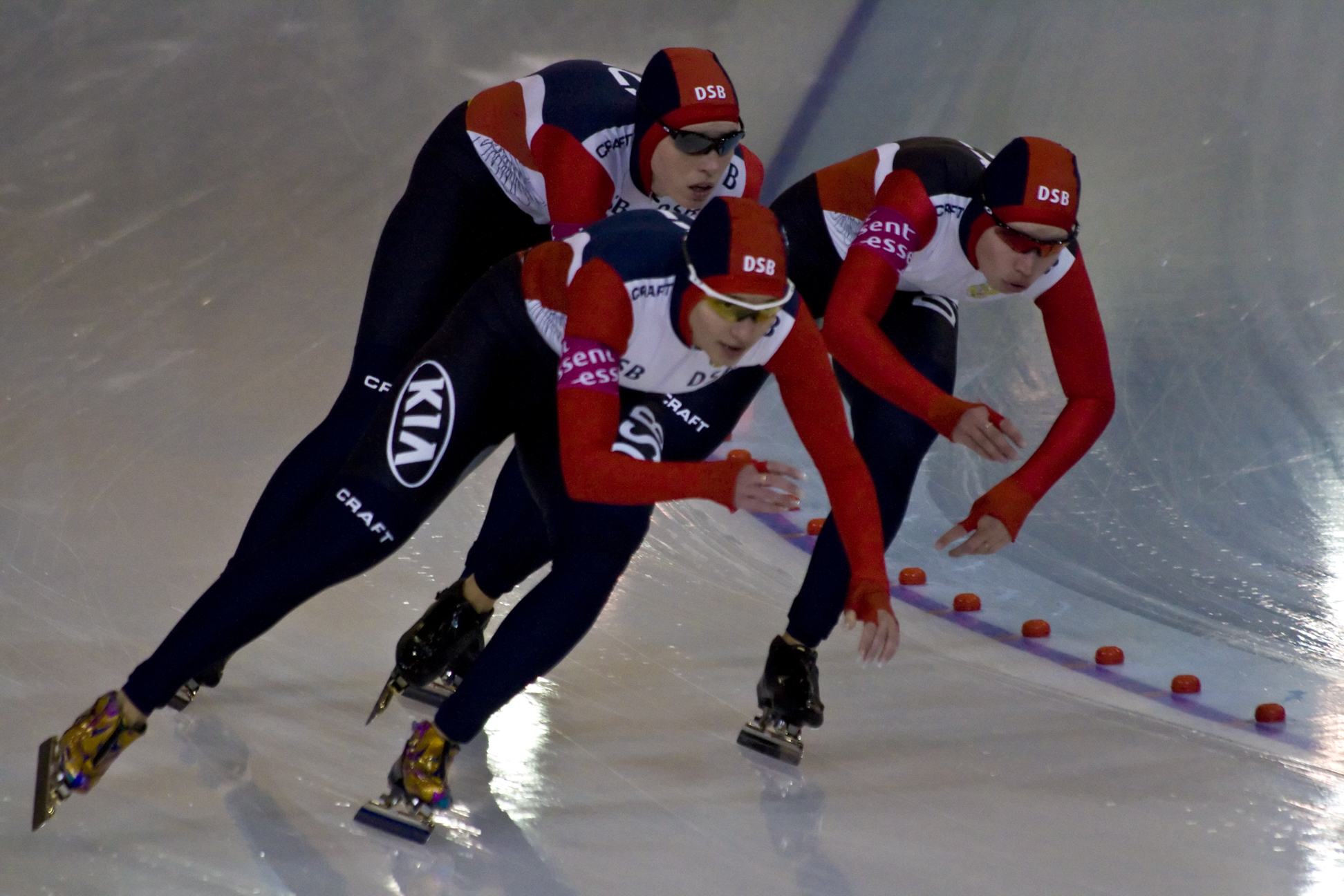
- Galina Likhachova with Yekaterina Shikhova and Yekaterina Lobysheva in 2009.

Medal record

Women's Speed skating

Representing Russia

Olympic Games
Bronze medal – third place	2006 Turin	Team Pursuit

Galina Vladimirovna Likhachova (Russian: Галина Владимировна Лихачёва; born July 15, 1977, in Sverdlovsk) is a Russian speed skater who won a bronze medal in the Women's team pursuit at the 2006 Winter Olympics.
