= Paweł Zygmunt =

Polish speed skater (born 1972)

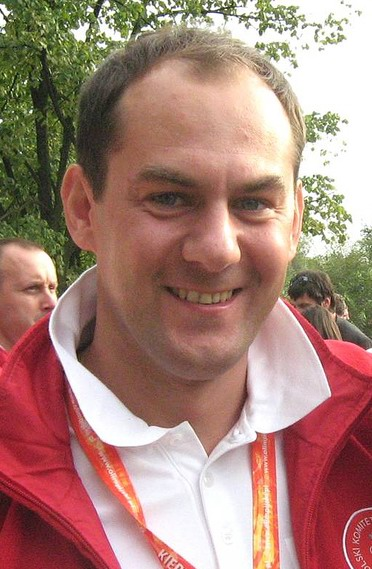
Paweł Zygmunt in 2007.

Paweł Jan Zygmunt (born 15 July 1972 in Krosno) is a retired Polish speed skater. He was born in Krosno. He competed at the 1994 Winter Olympics, 1998 Winter Olympics, 2002 Winter Olympics and 2006 Winter Olympics. In 2002 in Salt Lake City he placed 14th in men's 5,000 metres and 14th in 10,000 metres. In Turin in 2006 he placed 18th in 5,000 metres.
