= Jennifer Rodriguez =

American speed skater

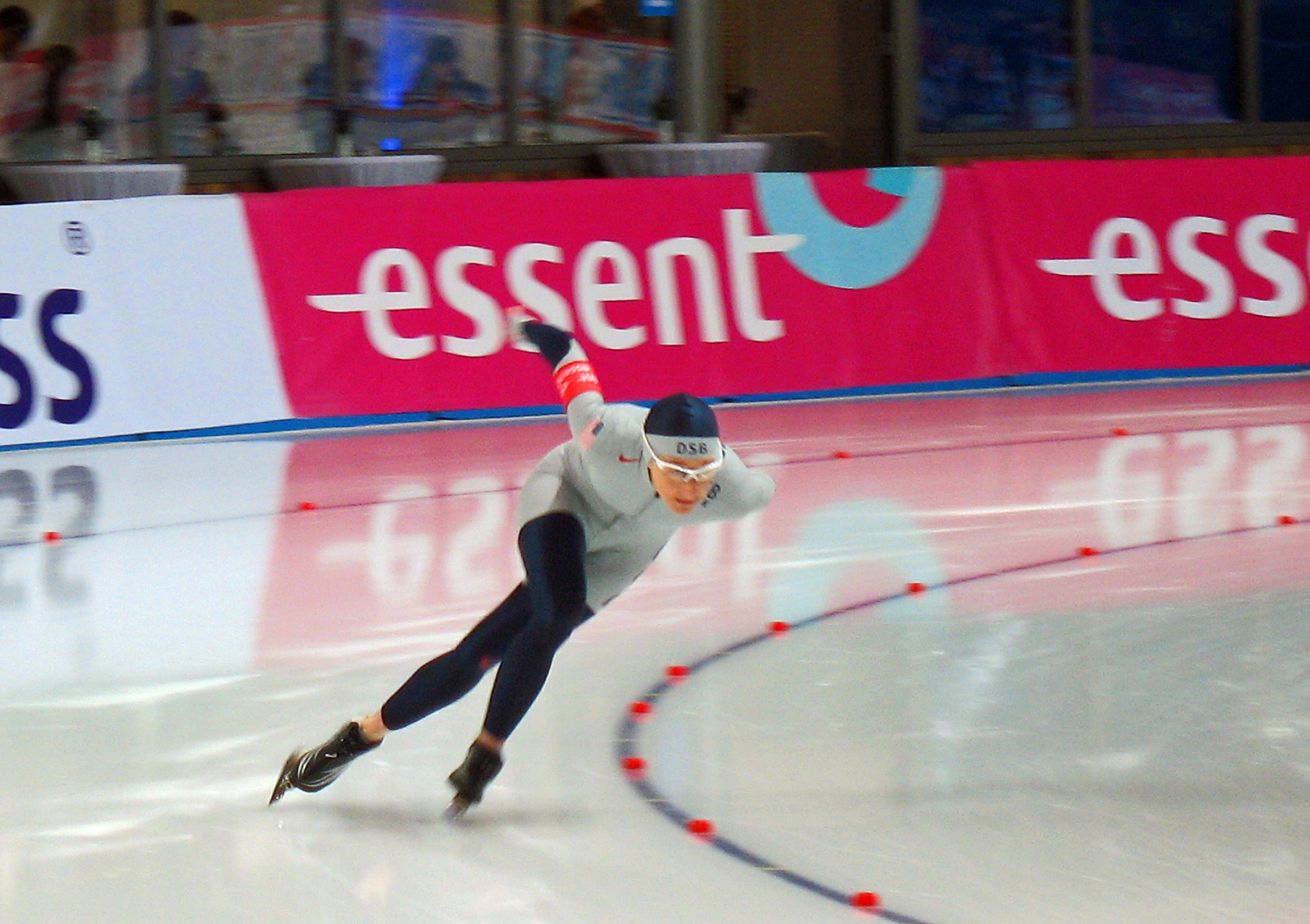

Personal information
- Born: June 8, 1976 (age 50) Miami, Florida
- Height: 1.62 m (5 ft 4 in)
- Weight: 59 kg (130 lb)

Sport
- Country: United States
- Sport: Speed skating
Medal record
Women's speed skating
Representing the United States
Olympic Games
Bronze medal – third place	2002 Salt Lake City	1000 m
Bronze medal – third place	2002 Salt Lake City	1500 m
World Sprint Championships
Gold medal – first place	2005 Salt Lake City	Sprint
Bronze medal – third place	2004 Nagano	Sprint
World Single Distance Championships
Silver medal – second place	2003 Berlin	1000 m
Bronze medal – third place	2005 Inzell	1500 m
Bronze medal – third place	2004 Seoul	1500 m
Bronze medal – third place	2003 Berlin	1500 m

Jennifer Rodriguez (born June 8, 1976) is a Cuban-American speed skater. She started her career as an artistic roller skater, winning multiple national championships and placing second and third at world championships. Later she switched to inline speed skating and became world champion in 1993. Her inline speed coach was Bob Manning.

In 1996 she made another career move by giving it a try on ice, in order to have a chance to make the Olympic team. This was a success, and she participated in the 1998, 2002, 2006 and 2010 Winter Olympics, winning two bronze medals in Salt Lake City in 2002. She is also known by the nicknames Miami Ice and J-Rod.

She was previously married to American speed skater K. C. Boutiette, who was the first to switch from inline speed skating to ice skating and motivated Rodriguez to do the same.

Personal records
Women's speed skating
Event	Result	Date	Location	Notes
500 m	37.87	November 18, 2005	Utah Olympic Oval, Salt Lake City	
1000 m	1:14.05	January 22, 2005	Utah Olympic Oval, Salt Lake City	
1500 m	1:54.19	December 12, 2009	Utah Olympic Oval, Salt Lake City	
3000 m	4:04.99	February 10, 2002	Utah Olympic Oval, Salt Lake City	
5000 m	7:07.93	December 22, 2001	Utah Olympic Oval, Salt Lake City	

== See also ==
- List of Cuban Americans
