= Nicola Mayr =

Italian speed skater

Personal information
- Nationality: Italian
- Born: 6 April 1978 (age 46); Bolzano, Italy

Sport
- Sport: Speed skating

Nicola Mayr (born 6 April 1978) is an Italian speed skater. She competed in two events at the 2002 Winter Olympics.
