= Olena Myahkikh =

Ukrainian speed skater

Olena Vasylivna Myahkikh (Ukrainian: Олена Василівна Мягких) (born December 23, 1978) is a Ukrainian long track speed skater who participates in international competitions.

== Personal records ==
Personal records
Women's Speed skating
Event	Result	Date	Location	Notes
500 m	40.82	2003-12-12	Salt Lake City	
1,000 m	1:19.49	2005-11-18	Salt Lake City	
1,500 m	2:01.42	2005-11-20	Salt Lake City	
3,000 m	4:19.60	2001-03-15	Calgary	
5,000 m	7:36.17	2001-03-16	Calgary	

=== Career highlights ===
Olympic Winter Games
2002 - Salt Lake City, 31st at 3000 m
2002 - Salt Lake City, 35th at 1000 m
2002 - Salt Lake City, 38th at 1500 m
World Sprint Championships
2006 - Heerenveen, 31st
European Allround Championships
1999 - Heerenveen, 25th
2000 - Hamar, 22nd
2001 - Baselga di Pinè, 19th
2003 - Heerenveen, 19th
2004 - Heerenveen, 19th
2005 - Heerenveen, 21st
2006 - Hamar, 22nd
2007 - Collalbo, 22nd
2008 - Kolomna, 21st
National Championships
2004 - Kyiv, (gold) 1st at 500 m
2004 - Kyiv, (silver) 2nd at 3000 m
2004 - Kyiv, (gold) 1st at 1500 m
2004 - Kyiv, (gold) 1st at 1000 m
2004 - Kyiv, (gold) 1st at 5000 m
