= Lasse Sætre =

Norwegian speed skater

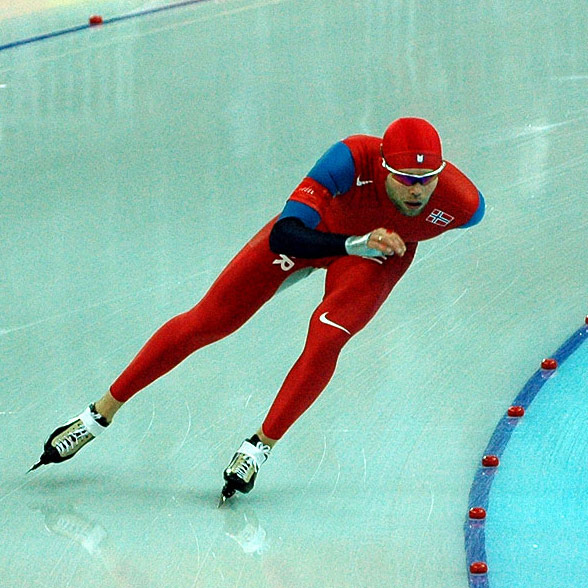
- Sætre at the 2006 Olympics

Personal information
- Born: 10 March 1974 (age 52) Sand, Norway
- Height: 1.82 m (5 ft 11 1/2 in)
- Weight: 85 kg (187 lb)

Sport
- Country: Norway
- Sport: Speed skating
Medal record
Representing Norway
Men's speed skating
Olympic Games
Bronze medal – third place	2002 Salt Lake City	10000 m

Lasse Sætre (born 10 March 1974) is a former speed skater from Norway, who for several years was among the world's best long distance skaters. Sætre who grew up in Nord-Odal Municipality, competed in the 1998, 2002 and 2006 Olympics, and won a 10,000-m bronze in the 2002 Winter Olympics. He won another 10,000-m bronze in the 2003 World Single Distance Championships. As of December 2006, only seven skaters in the world have 10,000-m results below 13 minutes, and Sætre has twice achieved such results. His personal bests are 38.15, 1:49.36, 6:17.60 and 12:56.85. Sætre is currently one of only four skaters to have skated the 10,000m more than once in a time of under 13 minutes, along with Chad Hedrick, Sven Kramer and Carl Verheijen, and among those four was the second to achieve it (after Hedrick).

He married speed skater Ester Stølen in 2002.
