= Valentina Yakshina =

Russian speed skater

Personal information
- Nationality: Russian
- Born: 6 February 1976 (age 50) Saint Petersburg, Soviet Union

Sport
- Sport: Speed skating

Valentina Yakshina (born 6 February 1976) is a Russian speed skater. She competed at the 2002 Winter Olympics and the 2006 Winter Olympics.
