= Yevgeny Lalenkov =

Russian speed skater

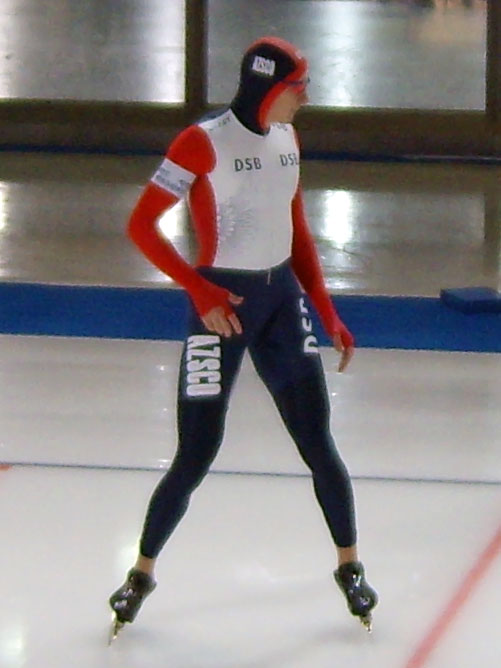
- Dankers in 2007

Medal record

Men's speed skating

Representing Russia

World Single Distance Championships
Silver medal – second place	2008 Nagano	1000 m
Bronze medal – third place	2007 Salt Lake City	Team pursuit

Yevgeny Alexeyevich Lalenkov (Russian: Евгений Алексеевич Лаленков; born February 16, 1981, in Angarsk) is a Russian former long track speed skater who participated in international competitions. He won a silver medal at 1000m at the 2008 single-distance World Championships in Nagano.

He married speed skater Evgeniia Lalenkova.

== Personal records ==
Personal records
Men's speed skating
Event	Result	Date	Location	Notes
500 m	35.56	2007-11-09	Salt Lake City	
1,000 m	1:07.50	2007-11-11	Salt Lake City	
1,500 m	1:43.16	2007-11-09	Salt Lake City	
3,000 m	3:51.31	2005-08-12	Calgary	
5,000 m	6:31.59	2007-11-17	Calgary	
10,000 m	13:55.36	2007-12-16	Kolomna	

=== Career highlights ===
Olympic Winter Games
2006 - Turin, 7th at 1000 m
2006 - Turin, 23rd at 1500 m
2006 - Turin, 5th at team pursuit
2010 - Vancouver, 36th at 500 m
2010 - Vancouver, 23rd at 1000 m
2010 - Vancouver, 10th at 1500 m
World Allround Championships
2002 - Heerenveen, 10th
2003 - Gothenburg, 5th
2004 - Hamar, 8th
2005 - Moscow, 12th
World Sprint Championships
2006 - Heerenveen, 10th
2007 - Hamar, 10th
World Single Distance Championships
2002 - Salt Lake City, 23rd at 1000 m
2002 - Salt Lake City, 10th at 1500 m
2003 - Berlin, 4th at 1500 m
2004 - Seoul, 7th at 1500 m
2005 - Inzell, 8th at 1500 m
2008 - Nagano, (silver) 2nd at 1000 m
European Allround Championships
2003 - Heerenveen, 7th
2004 - Heerenveen, 6th
2005 - Heerenveen, 14th
2008 - Kolomna, 9th
World Junior Allround Championships
1999 - Geithus, 17th
2000 - Seinäjoki, 6th
World Cup
2002 - Inzell, (silver) 2nd at 1500 m
2002 - Hamar, (gold) 1st at 1500 m
2002 - Erfurt, (silver) 2nd at 1500 m
2002 - Heerenveen, (silver) 2nd at 1500 m
2003 - Baselga di Pinè, (gold) 1st at 1500 m
2003 - Baselga di Pinè, (bronze) 3rd at team pursuit
2003 - Heerenveen, (gold) 1st at 1500 m (March)
2003 - (gold) 1st at World Cup Rankings 1500 m
2003 - Heerenveen, (gold) 1st at 1500 m (November)
2003 - Heerenveen, (bronze) 3rd at 3000/5000 m allround
2004 - Heerenveen, (bronze) 3rd at 1500 m
2004 - (bronze) 3rd at World Cup Rankings 1500 m
National Championships
2001 - Divnogorsk, (bronze) 3rd at 1500 m
2001 - Divnogorsk, (bronze) 3rd at 1000 m
2002 - Berlin, (bronze) 3rd at 1500 m
2002 - Berlin, (gold) 1st at 1000 m
2003 - Kirov, (silver) 2nd at allround
2004 - Chelyabinsk, (silver) 2nd at allround
2004 - Nizhni Novgorod, (bronze) 3rd at 500 m
2005 - Moscow, (silver) 2nd at allround
2006 - Moscow, (gold) 1st at 1500 m
2006 - Moscow, (gold) 1st at 1000 m
2006 - Moscow, (gold) 1st at team pursuit
Nordic Junior Games
1999 - Helsinki, (gold) 1st at 1000 m
1999 - Helsinki, (bronze) 3rd at 1500 m
2000 - Chemnitz, (silver) 2nd at 1500 m
2000 - Chemnitz, (silver) 2nd at 3000 m
2000 - Chemnitz, (gold) 1st at 1000 m
Nordic Neo Senior Games
2001 - Kolomna, (bronze) 3rd at 5000 m
2001 - Kolomna, (gold) 1st at 1500 m
