= Varvara Barysheva =

Russian speed skater (born 1977)

Olympic medal record

Women's speed skating

Representing Russia
Bronze medal – third place	2006 Turin	Team pursuit

Varvara Borisovna Barysheva (born 24 March 1977) is a Russian speed skater who won a bronze medal in the women's team pursuit at the 2006 Winter Olympics.

Personal records
Women's speed skating
Event	Result	Date	Location	Notes
500 m	38:86	15 March 2001	Olympic Oval, Calgary	
1000 m	1:15.70	17 March 2001	Olympic Oval, Calgary	
1500 m	1:55.22	16 March 2001	Olympic Oval, Calgary	
3000 m	4:05.73	9 March 2001	Utah Olympic Oval, Salt Lake City	
5000 m	6:56.97	23 February 2002	Utah Olympic Oval, Salt Lake City	
