= Utah Olympic Oval =

American speed skating oval in Kearns, Utah, U.S.

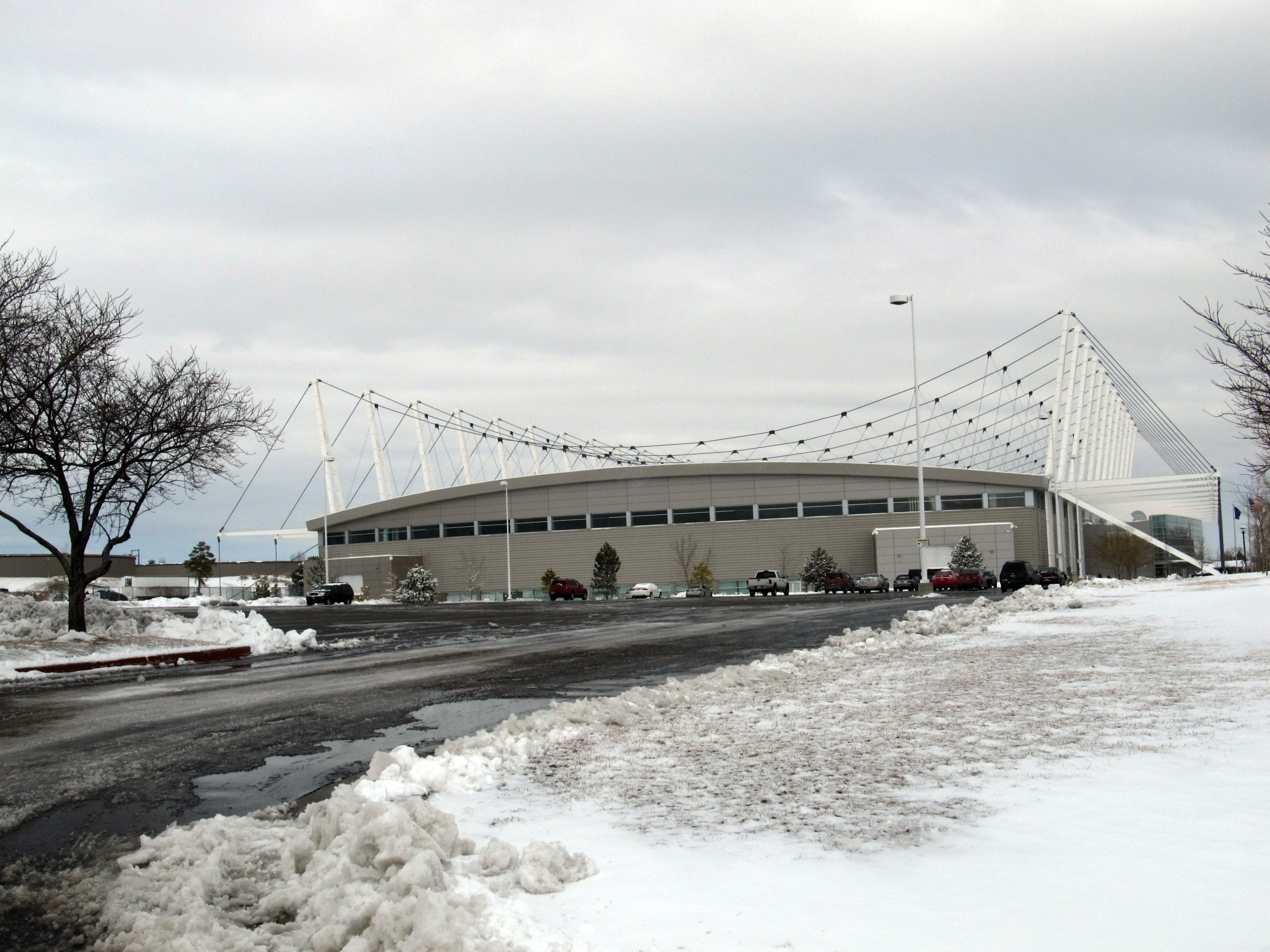
- The Utah Olympic Oval
- Interactive map of Utah Olympic Oval
- Former names: Oquirrh Park Oval
- Address: 5662 South Cougar Lane; Kearns, Utah, United States
- Coordinates: 40.64784°N 112.00877°W
- Owner: Utah Athletic Foundation
- Capacity: 3,000; 6,500 (2002 Winter Olympics)
- Surface: Ice
- Acreage: 5 acres (2.0 ha)

Construction
- Built: 1999–2001
- Opened: February 2001
- Cost: US$30,000,000 (equivalent to $58,000,000 in 2025)
- Architect: Gilles Stransky Brems Smith Architects
- General contractor: Layton Construction

Tenants
- XIX Olympic Winter Games (February 2002); Utah Saints (AIFA) (2008)

Website
- Utah Olympic Oval

The Utah Olympic Oval is an indoor speed skating oval located 14 miles (23 km) southwest of Salt Lake City, in Kearns, Utah, United States. The Oval was built for the 2002 Winter Olympics and it hosted the long-track speed skating events for the 2002 games, a role it is expected to reprise for the 2034 Winter Olympics.

Inside the facility the 400 meter skating track surrounds two international sized ice sheets, and is itself surrounded by a 442-meter running track. Due to its high altitude, 4,675 feet (1,425 m), and the associated low air resistance, ten Olympic records and nine world records were set at the Oval during the 2002 games, the largest number of world records ever set at one event.

== History ==
Along with Soldier Hollow and the Utah Olympic Park, the Utah Olympic Oval was built specifically for the 2002 Winter Olympics. On October 5, 1992, the Utah Sports Authority chose the Oquirrh Park Fitness Center in Kearns as the site for the 2002 Olympic Oval, beating out other locations in West Valley City, Sandy and downtown Salt Lake City. Funds from the 1989 Olympic referendum would be used to construct the oval, and would be repaid with profits from the games. The plans called for using $3.7 million of tax payer money to construct the oval, which would be an outdoor facility. If Salt Lake City won its 1995 bid for the 2002 games, Olympic funds would be used to cover the oval, and build an ice sheet in the center of the track. By the time the groundbreaking ceremony was held in May 1994, the price tag had increased to $4.1 million, with an expected completion date sometime that December. Because of cold temperatures and a wet spring, cement for the oval could not be poured, and the oval didn't open until September 1, 1995, almost a year behind schedule. The oval was formally dedicated in a ceremony, attended by Olympian Cathy Turner, on January 12, 1996. Prior to it being covered and used during the Olympic games, the oval would be used for inline skating during the summer and ice skating during the winter months.

After Salt Lake City won the 2002 Olympic bid on June 16, 1995, Salt Lake Organizing Committee (SLOC) began the design process for a permanent cover for the oval. During the cover's design process it was decided to pull up and replace the entire original oval. The new oval was designed by Gilles Stransky Brems Smith of Salt Lake City, and constructed by Layton Construction. Work on the new oval began in June 1999 at an estimated cost of $27 million. To keep those costs down, and give an unobstructed view of the ice, the roof would be constructed similar to a suspension bridge. Between twenty-four masts, twelve on each side of the building, steel cables nearly 400 feet (120 m) long and 3.5 inches (89 mm) in diameter were strung, suspending the roof above the oval.

On April 19, 2000, as construction was progressing on the oval, some of the bolts holding the roof's cables sheared, causing part of the roof to collapse. Following an investigation into the cause of the accident and repairs, construction resumed in July 2000. Construction on the oval was further delayed when three weeks after the concrete floor was poured, the freeze tubes in numerous spots were found to have moved off their rebar supports and had floated out of alignment. It was determined that entire floor was going to have to be torn up and replaced, or else the ice might not freeze evenly. After a new floor was poured, and had cured, the final coat of ice was added to the track on February 12, 2001; just in time for four Olympic speed skaters to test out the new venue later that afternoon. The first event held in the new oval was the World Single Distance Championships, on March 9–11, 2001. On March 9, 2001, the first day of competitions, a press briefing to introduce the facility was held. Members of SLOC with the design and construction teams were present to introduce the oval to the public.

The completed building has 275,000 square feet (25,500 m^{2}), roughly the size of four football fields, it is 310 feet (94 m) wide by 655 feet (200 m) long, with a ceiling 55 feet (17 m) high; the low ceiling allowed the temperature inside to be easily maintained at the appropriate conditions. The completed facility contained the 400-meter oval skating track, which surrounded two international size hockey ice sheets. Under the ice sheets and track are 33 miles (53 km) of freeze tubes which keep the concrete base at 18 °F (−8 °C) year-round. In the end the oval ended up costing $30 million, and on his blog, ex-SLOC CEO and politician, Mitt Romney states that the Utah Olympic Oval was 10 percent the cost of the Richmond Olympic Oval used during the 2010 Winter Olympics.

=== 2002 and 2034 Winter Olympics ===
The oval hosted the long-track speed skating events during the 2002 Winter Olympics. For the competitions, temporary seating was installed and the oval had a capacity for about 5,200 spectators, plus press members. All available tickets for the venue's events were sold, allowing 53,056 spectators to witness events in the oval.

It is slated to again host long-track speed skating events during the 2034 Winter Olympics.

== The Oval today ==
Following the 2002 Olympics, SLOC turned ownership of the oval over to the Utah Athletic Foundation, who also owns and manages the Utah Olympic Park near Park City. The oval currently houses the original 400-meter oval skating track, two international size ice sheets, a 442-meter running track, an eight-lane 110-meter sprint running track, weight room, locker facilities and team rooms, meeting rooms, a concession, gifts and gear shop, plus skate rentals. Skating lessons are also offered by the foundation. The U.S. Olympic Speedskating Team is currently headquartered in the oval, and has been since January 2001. In 2024, the south sheet was converted to serve as the temporary practice rink for the National Hockey League (NHL)'s Utah Mammoth (then known as the Utah Hockey Club), while a permanent facility at the Shops at South Town in nearby Sandy was being built. The rink was narrowed from Olympic size to 200 ft x 85 ft, the standard measurement for NHL ice, and a team base was built in an unused area of the building.

== Records set at the Utah Olympic Oval ==
The oval is one of the world's fastest indoor skating tracks, mainly because of its elevation. It is the world's highest indoor oval at 4,675 feet (1,425 m) above sea level, 1,000 feet (300 m) higher than Calgary's Olympic Oval, site of the 1988 Winter Olympics (which is the second highest). Because of the elevation, there is less air resistance for the skaters and less oxygen frozen into the ice, making it harder, denser and faster.

During the 2002 Olympic games all ten speed skating events held in the oval set Olympic records. The oval still maintains six, thanks in part to the relatively low elevation of the 2006, 2010, and 2014 Olympic Ovals. Before and after the Olympics, the oval has hosted many local and international speed skating competitions. Holding the honor of Fastest Ice on Earth has created an unofficial rivalry between the Utah Olympic Oval and the Calgary Olympic Oval, although the Utah oval holds 11 world records and Calgary only 1.

=== Long track records ===
Olympic records
Men
Event	Time	Name	Nation	Date	Ref
1,000 meters	1:07.18	Gerard van Velde	Netherlands	February 16, 2002	
1,500 meters	1:43.95	Derek Parra	United States	February 19, 2002	
Women
3,000 meters	3:57.70	Claudia Pechstein	Germany	February 10, 2002	
5,000 meters	6:46.91	Claudia Pechstein	Germany	February 23, 2002	

World records
Men
Event	Time	Name	Nation	Date	Ref
500 meters	33.61	Pavel Kulizhnikov	Russia	March 9, 2019	
1,000 meters	1:05.37	Jordan Stolz	United States	January 26, 2024	
1,500 meters	1:40.17	Kjeld Nuis	Netherlands	March 10, 2019	
5,000 meters	6:00.23	Timothy Loubineaud	France	November 14, 2025	
10,000 meters	12:33.86	Graeme Fish	Canada	February 14, 2020	
Team pursuit (8 laps)	3:32.49	Casey Dawson; Emery Lehman; Ethan Cepuran	United States	November 16, 2025	
Women
500 meters	36.09	Femke Kok	Netherlands	November 16, 2025	
2×500 meters	74.19	Heather Bergsma	United States	December 28, 2013	
1000 meters	1.11,61	Brittany Bowe	United States	March 9, 2019	
1,500 meters	1:49,83	Miho Takagi	Japan	March 10, 2019	
3,000 meters	3:52.02	Martina Sáblíková	Czech Republic	March 9, 2019	
5,000 meters	6:39.02	Natalia Voronina	Russia	February 15, 2020	
Team sprint (3 laps)	1:24.02	Femke Kok; Jutta Leerdam; Letitia de Jong	Netherlands	February 13, 2020	
Team pursuit (6 laps)	2:50.76	Miho Takagi; Ayano Sato; Nana Takagi	Japan	February 14, 2020	
Mini samalog	153.776	Joy Beune	Netherlands	March 11, 2018	
Mixed
Event	Time	Name	Nation	Date	Ref
Mixed gender relay	2:54.90	Sun Chuanyi; Jin Wenjing	China	January 28, 2024	

=== Short track records ===
World records
Men
Event	Time	Name	Nation	Date	Ref
500 metres	39.905	Wu Dajing	China	11 November 2018	
1000 metres	1:20.875	Hwang Dae-heon	South Korea	12 November 2016	
1500 metres	2:07.943	Sjinkie Knegt	Netherlands	13 November 2016	
Women
Event	Time	Name	Nation	Date	Ref
500 metres	41.936	Kim Boutin	Canada	3 November 2019	
1500 metres	2:14.354	Choi Min-jeong	South Korea	12 November 2016	

== See also ==
- List of world records in speed skating
- List of Olympic records in speed skating
