= Asian Speed Skating Championships =

Annual speed skating competition

The Asian Speed Skating Championships are a series of speed skating events held annually to determine the best allround speed skater of Asia. These competitions are doubling as the qualification tournament for the World Allround Speed Skating Championships. The International Skating Union has organised the competitions since 1999.

- Asian Speed Skating Championships for Men
- Asian Speed Skating Championships for Women

== History ==
The Asian Open Short Track Speed Skating Trophy 2019 was held in Kunming, China, from August 27-28 in Junior and Senior. Training camp is supported by the ISU Development Program in 2019 in China again. 2024 in Indonesia.

== Combined all-time medal count ==
Rank	Country	Gold	Silver	Bronze	Total
1	Japan	19	23	15	57
2	Korea Republic	6	1	5	12
3	China	3	3	8	14
4	Kazakhstan	2	3	2	7

== Men's winners ==
Year	Location	Gold	Silver	Bronze
1999	(Japan) Nagano	(Japan) Hiroyuki Noake	(Japan) Takahiro Nozaki	(Japan) Kazuki Sawaguchi
2000	(Mongolia) Ulaanbaatar	(Japan) Hiroyuki Noake	(Kazakhstan) Sergey Tsybenko	(Japan) Keiji Shirahata
2001	(China) Harbin	(Japan) Keiji Shirahata	(Japan) Hiroyuki Noake	(Japan) Toshihiko Itokawa
2002	No competition			
2003	(China) Harbin	(Japan) Toshihiko Itokawa	(Japan) Takahiro Ushiyama	(Japan) Hiroki Hirako
2004	(South Korea) Chuncheon	(China) Li Changyu	(Japan) Hiroki Hirako	(South Korea) Lee Seung-Hwan
2005	(Japan) Ikaho	(Japan) Hiroki Hirako	(Japan) Takahiro Ushiyama	(Japan) Kesato Miyazaki
2006	(China) Harbin	(Kazakhstan) Dmitry Babenko	(Japan) Naoki Yasuda	(Japan) Kesato Miyazaki
2007	(China) Changchun	(South Korea) Choi Keun-won	(Japan) Hiroki Hirako	(China) Gao Xuefeng
2008	(China) Shenyang	(Japan) Hiroki Hirako	(South Korea) Choi Keun-won	(China) Song Xingyu
2009	(Japan) Tomakomai	(South Korea) Choi Keun-won	(Japan) Hiroki Hirako	(Kazakhstan) Dmitry Babenko
2010	(Japan) Obihiro	(South Korea) Lee Seung-hoon	(Japan) Hiroki Hirako	(Kazakhstan) Dmitry Babenko
2011	(China) Harbin	(South Korea) Lee Seung-hoon	(Kazakhstan) Dmitry Babenko	(South Korea) Ko Byeong-wook
2012	(Kazakhstan) Astana	(South Korea) Lee Seung-hoon	(Japan) Hiroki Hirako	(South Korea) Joo Hyong-jun
2013	(China) Changchun	(South Korea) Lee Seung-hoon	(Kazakhstan) Dmitry Babenko	(China) Sun Longjiang
2014	(Japan) Tomakomai	(Kazakhstan) Dmitry Babenko	(China) Fan Yang	(China) Sun Longjiang

== Women's winners ==
Year	Location	Gold	Silver	Bronze
1999	(Japan) Nagano	(Japan) Maki Tabata	(Japan) Nami Nemoto	(Japan) Eriko Seo
2000	(Mongolia) Ulaanbaatar	(Japan) Maki Tabata	(China) Song Li	(China) Gao Yang
2001	(China) Harbin	(Japan) Maki Tabata	(Japan) Nami Nemoto	(China) Song Li
2002	No competition			
2003	(China) Harbin	(Japan) Maki Tabata	(Japan) Nami Nemoto	(Japan) Eriko Seo
2004	(South Korea) Chuncheon	(Japan) Maki Tabata	(Japan) Eriko Ishino	(Japan) Eriko Seo
2005	(Japan) Ikaho	(Japan) Nami Nemoto	(Japan) Maki Tabata	(Japan) Eriko Ishino
2006	(China) Harbin	(China) Wang Fei	(Japan) Eriko Ishino	(Japan) Eriko Seo
2007	(China) Changchun	(China) Wang Fei	(Japan) Maki Tabata	(Japan) Eriko Ishino
2008	(China) Shenyang	(Japan) Maki Tabata	(Japan) Eriko Ishino	(China) Wang Fei
2009	(Japan) Tomakomai	(Japan) Masako Hozumi	(Japan) Maki Tabata	(Japan) Yuri Obara
2010	(Japan) Obihiro	(Japan) Masako Hozumi	(Japan) Shiho Ishizawa	(Japan) Maki Tabata
2011	(China) Harbin	(Japan) Eriko Ishino	(Japan) Masako Hozumi	(Japan) Ayaka Kikuchi
2012	(Kazakhstan) Astana	(Japan) Miho Takagi	(Japan) Ayaka Kikuchi	(South Korea) Park Do-yeong
2013	(China) Changchun	(Japan) Masako Hozumi	(Japan) Eriko Ishino	(South Korea) Kim Bo-reum
2014	(Japan) Tomakomai	(Japan) Miho Takagi	(China) Zhao Xin	(China) Li Qishi

== Links ==
- speedskatingresults.com
