= 2000 World Allround Speed Skating Championships =

International speed skating competition

World Allround Speed Skating Championships
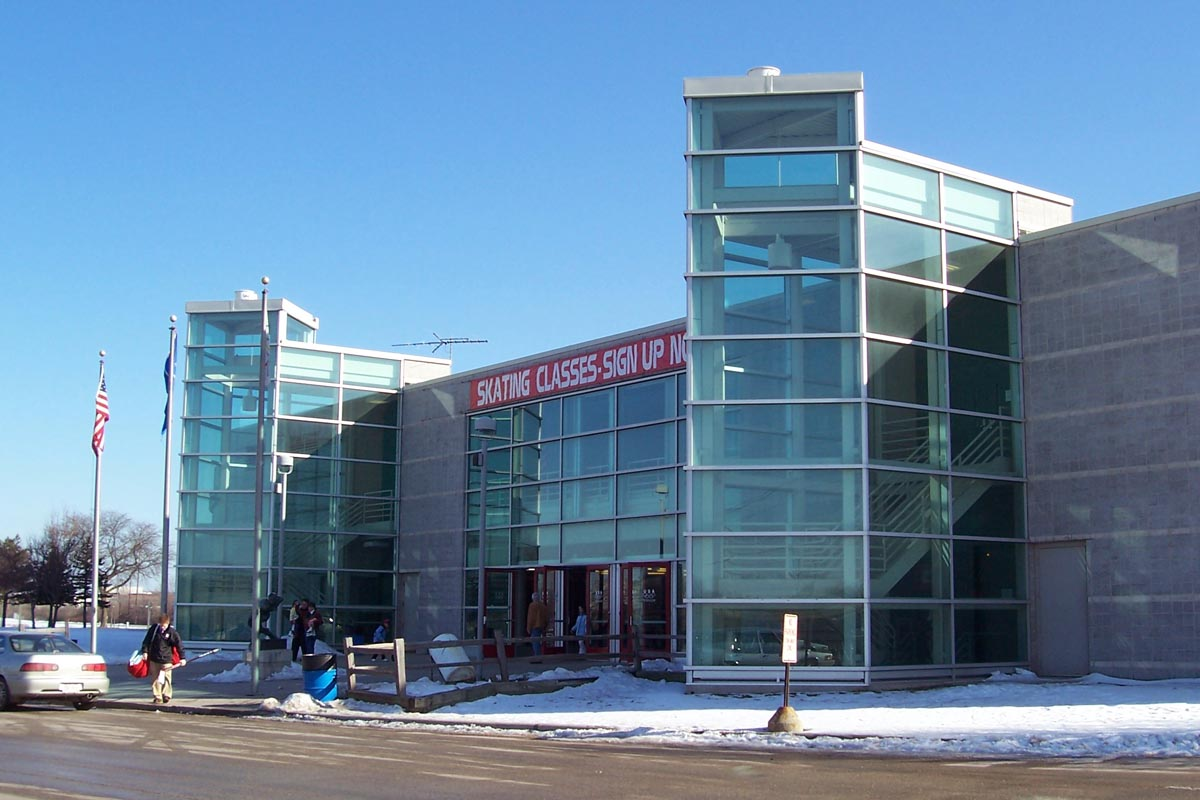
- Pettit National Ice Center
- Location: Milwaukee, United States
- Venue: Pettit National Ice Center
- Dates: 5–6 February
- Competitors: 48

Medalist men
1st place, gold medalist(s)		Gianni Romme	NED
2nd place, silver medalist(s)		Rintje Ritsma	NED
3rd place, bronze medalist(s)		Ids Postma	NED

Medalist women
1st place, gold medalist(s)		Claudia Pechstein	GER
2nd place, silver medalist(s)		Gunda Niemann-Stirnemann	GER
3rd place, bronze medalist(s)		Maki Tabata	JPN

The 2000 World Allround Speed Skating Championships was held on 5–6 February 2000 in the Pettit National Ice Center in Milwaukee.

Title defenders from the 1999 Championship in the Hamar Vikingskipet were Gunda Niemann-Stirnemann (Germany) and Rintje Ritsma (Netherlands).

German Claudia Pechstein and Dutchman Gianni Romme became world champion.

== Women's tournament ==
24 skaters, 13 from Europe (Germany (4), Netherlands (4), Norway (2), Russia (2) and Austria (1)), 4 from North-America (Canada (3) and the United States (1)), 7 from Asia (Japan (3), China (2), Kazakhstan (1) and South Korea (1)), participated. Seven skaters made their World Championship debut.

Emese Hunyady (4th place) participated in her 15th WC Allround tournament and was the first female to reach this milestone.

== Men's championships ==
=== Allround results ===
Place	Athlete	Country	Points	500 m	5000 m	1500 m	10000 m
1st place, gold medalist(s)	Gianni Romme	Netherlands	153.277	37.68 (12)	**6:26.14 (1)**	1:50.36 (4)	**13:23.94 (1)**
2nd place, silver medalist(s)	Ids Postma	Netherlands	155.433	36.56 (3)	6:40.89 (7)	1:50.28 (3)	14:00.48 (9)
3rd place, bronze medalist(s)	Rintje Ritsma	Netherlands	155.822	37.20 (7)	6:40.70 (6)	1:50.46 (5)	13:54.65 (7)
4	Bart Veldkamp	Belgium	156.072	38.39 (19)	6:36.78 (3)	1:50.90 (7)	13:40.77 (2)
5	Roberto Sighel	Italy	156.380	37.49 (10)	6:40.50 (5)	1:51.22 (8)	13:55.35 (8)
6	Keiji Shirahata	Japan	156.701	38.08 (16)	6:38.88 (4)	1:52.42 (14)	13:45.20 (4)
7	Hiroyuki Noake	Japan	156.771	37.11 (6)	6:42.73 (9)	1:50.60 (6)	14:10.45 (10)
8	Frank Dittrich	Germany	157.839	39.08 (23)	6:36.02 (2)	1:54.17 (22)	13:42.03 (3)
9	Kevin Marshall	Canada	157.914	37.20 (7)	6:46.01 (14)	1:51.78 (10)	14:17.07 (11)
10	Ådne Søndrål	Norway	158.108	36.08 (2)	6:54.08 (22)	1:47.82 (1)	14:53.41 *(12)
11	Knut Morgenstern	Germany	158.354	38.30 (18)	6:42.68 (8)	1:55.09 (23)	13:48.46 (5)
12	Martin Feigenwinter	Switzerland	161.339	40.35 (24)	6:43.00 (10)	1:57.06 (24)	13:53.38 (6)
NQ13	Sergej Tsibenko	Kazakhstan	115.564	37.34 (9)	6:49.54 (19)	1:51.81 (11)	
NQ14	Derek Parra	United States	115.630	37.49 (10)	6:46.34 (15)	1:52.52 (15)	
NQ15	Eskil Ervik	Norway	115.674	37.76 (13)	6:47.74 (18)	1:51.42 (9)	
NQ16	K. C. Boutiette	United States	115.856	37.09 (5)	6:49.63 (20)	1:53.41 (19)	
NQ17	Steven Elm	Canada	116.004	37.81 (14)	6:46.74 (16)	1:52.56 (16)	
NQ18	Mark Knoll	Canada	116.376	38.08 (16)	6:45.16 (12)	1:53.34 (18)	
NQ19	Vadim Sayutin	Russia	116.463	38.69 (21)	6:43.13 (11)	1:52.38 (13)	
NQ20	Petter Andersen	Norway	116.490	36.68 (4)	7:13.80 *(23)	1:49.29 (2)	
NQ21	Takahiro Nozaki	Japan	116.640	37.93 (15)	6:51.64 (21)	1:52.64 (17)	
NQ22	Paweł Zygmunt	Poland	117.103	38.70 (22)	6:45.43 (13)	1:53.58 (20)	
NQ23	Marnix ten Kortenaar	Austria	117.256	38.62 (20)	6:47.13 (17)	1:53.77 (21)	
NQ24	Choi Jae-bong	South Korea	117.439	**36.01 (1)**	7:21.29 (24)	1:51.90 (12)	

bold indicates championships record
* = with fall
NQ = Not qualified for the 10000 m (only the best 12 are qualified)
NF = not finished
NS = not started
DQ = disqualified

== Women's championships ==
=== Allround results ===
Place	Athlete	Country	Points	500 m	3000 m	1500 m	5000 m
1st place, gold medalist(s)	Claudia Pechstein	Germany	163.830	40.18 (4)	4:06.44 (1)	1:59.97 (2)	7:05.87 (2)
2nd place, silver medalist(s)	Gunda Niemann-Stirnemann	Germany	163.985	40.43 (8)	4:06.83 (2)	2:00.62 (3)	7:02.11 (1)
3rd place, bronze medalist(s)	Maki Tabata	Japan	165.296	39.68 (2)	4:13.79 (3)	1:59.52 (1)	7:14.78 (3)
4	Emese Hunyady	Austria	168.287	39.78 (3)	4:16.43 (7)	2:01.12 (6)	7:33.96 (11)
5	Renate Groenewold	Netherlands	168.688	41.44 (18)	4:14.83 (4)	2:01.22 (7)	7:23.71 (5)
6	Tonny de Jong	Netherlands	168.698	40.40 (7)	4:17.27 (10)	2:02.52 (12)	7:25.80 (6)
7	Svetlana Bazhanova	Russia	168.883	41.09 (16)	4:15.85 (5)	2:01.34 (8)	7:27.06 (7)
8	Song Li	China	168.914	40.28 (5)	4:19.12 (14)	2:01.11 (5)	7:30.78 (10)
9	Cindy Overland	Canada	169.272	41.13 (17)	4:16.67 (9)	2:01.93 (11)	7:27.21 (8)
10	Annamarie Thomas	Netherlands	169.681	40.46 (9)	4:18.17 (11)	2:01.08 (4)	7:38.33 (12)
11	Lyudmila Prokasheva	Kazakhstan	170.547	41.81 (21)	4:16.50 (8)	2:03.00 (15)	7:29.87 (9)
12	Anni Friesinger	Germany	216.341	1:29.48 *(24)	4:16.29 (6)	2:01.57 (9)	7:16.23 (4)
NQ13	Cindy Klassen	Canada	124.666	40.51 (10)	4:18.46 (13)	2:03.24 (16)	
NQ14	Marieke Wijsman	Netherlands	124.737	40.30 (6)	4:23.35 (19)	2:01.64 (10)	
NQ15	Varvara Barysheva	Russia	124.882	40.84 (13)	4:19.18 (15)	2:02.54 (13)	
NQ16	Jennifer Rodriguez	United States	125.457	40.86 (14)	4:21.97 (18)	2:02.81 (14)	
NQ17	Daniela Anschütz	Germany	126.352	41.71 (19)	4:20.68 (17)	2:03.59 (17)	
NQ18	Kristina Groves	Canada	126.436	41.95 (22)	4:18.24 (12)	2:04.34 (18)	
NQ19	Edel Therese Høiseth	Norway	126.489	39.48 (1)	4:32.30 (24)	2:04.88 (19)	
NQ20	Gao Yang	China	126.573	40.60 (12)	4:25.26 (20)	2:05.29 (21)	
NQ21	Aki Narita	Japan	127.163	41.74 (20)	4:20.12 (16)	2:06.21 (22)	
NQ22	Chiharu Nozaki	Japan	127.357	40.99 (15)	4:28.09 (21)	2:05.06 (20)	
NQ23	Baek Eun-bi	South Korea	130.967	42.01 (23)	4:29.47 (22)	2:12.14 (23)	
NQ24	Ellen Kathrine Lie	Norway	138.214	40.57 (11)	4:31.07 (23)	2:37.40 *(24)	

* = with fall
NQ = Not qualified for the 5000 m (only the best 12 are qualified)
NF = not finished
NS = not started
DQ = disqualified

== Rules ==
All 24 participating skaters are allowed to skate the first three distances; 12 skaters may take part on the fourth distance. These 12 skaters are determined by taking the standings on the longest of the first three distances, as well as the samalog standings after three distances, and comparing these lists as follows:

1. Skaters among the top 12 on both lists are qualified.
2. To make up a total of 12, skaters are then added in order of their best rank on either list. Samalog standings take precedence over the longest-distance standings in the event of a tie.
