= 2000 Asian Speed Skating Championships =

Speed skating competition in Ulaanbaatar, Mongolia

Asian Speed Skating Championships
- Venue: Handgait Ice Rink (Ulaanbaatar, Mongolia)
- Dates: 14 and 15 January 2000
- Competitors: 24 from 4 nations

Medalist men
1st place, gold medalist(s)		Hiroyuki Noake	JPN
2nd place, silver medalist(s)		Sergey Tsybenko	KAZ
3rd place, bronze medalist(s)		Keiji Shirahata	JPN

Medalist women
1st place, gold medalist(s)		Maki Tabata	JPN
2nd place, silver medalist(s)		Song Li	CHN
3rd place, bronze medalist(s)		Gao Yang	CHN

The 2000 Asian Speed Skating Championships were held between 14 January and 15 January 2000 at Handgait Ice Rink in Ulaanbaatar, Mongolia.

== Women championships ==
=== Day 1 ===
==== 500 meter ====
Place	Athlete	Country	Time
1st place, gold medalist(s)	Song Li	China	41.30
2nd place, silver medalist(s)	Maki Tabata	Japan	41.82
3rd place, bronze medalist(s)	Gao Yang	China	42.23
4	Aki Narita	Japan	42.78
5	Eriko Seo	Japan	43.01
6	Lyudmila Prokasheva	Kazakhstan	43.13
7	Chiharu Nozaki	Japan	43.30
8	Lu Yajun	China	43.50
9	Baek Eun-Bi	South Korea	43.75
10	Zhang Xiaolei	China	43.77
11	Kanae Kobayashi	Japan	43.93
12	Choi Jin-Seon	South Korea	44.89

==== 3000 meter ====
Place	Athlete	Country	Time
1st place, gold medalist(s)	Maki Tabata	Japan	4:31.59
2nd place, silver medalist(s)	Song Li	China	4:37.74
3rd place, bronze medalist(s)	Lyudmila Prokasheva	Kazakhstan	4:39.65
4	Gao Yang	China	4:40.04
5	Chiharu Nozaki	Japan	4:40.68
6	Aki Narita	Japan	4:40.74
7	Eriko Seo	Japan	4:42.07
8	Baek Eun-Bi	South Korea	4:43.41
9	Kanae Kobayashi	Japan	4:47.49
10	Lu Yajun	China	4:49.70
11	Zhang Xiaolei	China	4:52.10
12	Choi Jin-Seon	South Korea	4:54.26

=== Day 2 ===
==== 1500 meter ====
Place	Athlete	Country	Time
1st place, gold medalist(s)	Maki Tabata	Japan	2:05.85
2nd place, silver medalist(s)	Song Li	China	2:06.40
3rd place, bronze medalist(s)	Lyudmila Prokasheva	Kazakhstan	2:10.17
4	Gao Yang	China	2:10.68
5	Chiharu Nozaki	Japan	2:11.75
6	Baek Eun-Bi	South Korea	2:12.30
7	Kanae Kobayashi	Japan	2:12.39
8	Zhang Xiaolei	China	2:12.58
9	Eriko Seo	Japan	2:14.81
10	Lu Yajun	China	2:16.23
11	Aki Narita	Japan	2:16.86
12	Choi Jin-Seon	South Korea	2:17.67

=== Allround Results ===
Place	Athlete	Country	500m	3000m	1500m	points
1st place, gold medalist(s)	Maki Tabata	Japan	41.82 (2)	4:31.59 (1)	2:05.85 (1)	129.035
2nd place, silver medalist(s)	Song Li	China	41.30 (1)	4:37.74 (2)	2:06.40 (2)	129.723
3rd place, bronze medalist(s)	Gao Yang	China	42.23 (3)	4:40.04 (4)	2:10.68 (4)	132.463
4	Lyudmila Prokasheva	Kazakhstan	43.13 (6)	4:39.65 (3)	2:10.17 (3)	133.128
5	Chiharu Nozaki	Japan	43.30 (7)	4:40.68 (5)	2:11.75 (5)	133.996
6	Eriko Seo	Japan	43.01 (5)	4:42.07 (7)	2:14.81 (9)	134.957
7	Baek Eun-Bi	South Korea	43.75 (9)	4:43.41 (8)	2:12.30 (6)	135.085
8	Aki Narita	Japan	42.78 (4)	4:40.74 (6)	2:16.86 (11)	135.190
9	Kanae Kobayashi	Japan	43.93 (11)	4:47.49 (9)	2:12.39 (7)	135.975
10	Zhang Xiaolei	China	43.77 (10)	4:52.10 (11)	2:12.58 (8)	136.646
11	Lu Yajun	China	43.50 (8)	4:49.70 (10)	2:16.23 (10)	137.193
12	Choi Jin-Seon	South Korea	44.89 (12)	4:54.26 (12)	2:17.67 (12)	139.823

== Men championships ==
=== Day 1 ===
==== 500 meter ====
Place	Athlete	Country	Time
1st place, gold medalist(s)	Hiroyuki Noake	Japan	37.72
2nd place, silver medalist(s)	Park Jae-Man	South Korea	38.90
3rd place, bronze medalist(s)	Sergey Tsybenko	Kazakhstan	38.92
4	Liu Liyou	China	39.00
5	Mun Jun	South Korea	39.12
6	Keiji Shirahata	Japan	39.21
7	Takahiro Nozaki	Japan	39.61
8	Liu Guangbin	China	39.63
9	Kazuki Sawaguchi	Japan	39.81
10	Liu Tongyang	China	39.83
11	Yu Tao	China	40.27
12	Nikolay Ulyanin	Kazakhstan	1:09.18

==== 5000 meter ====
Place	Athlete	Country	Time
1st place, gold medalist(s)	Keiji Shirahata	Japan	7:02.12
2nd place, silver medalist(s)	Takahiro Nozaki	Japan	7:07.83
3rd place, bronze medalist(s)	Sergey Tsybenko	Kazakhstan	7:14.37
4	Hiroyuki Noake	Japan	7:14.71
5	Liu Guangbin	China	7:21.33
6	Mun Jun	South Korea	7:22.04
7	Liu Tongyang	China	7:24.91
8	Kazuki Sawaguchi	Japan	7:26.84
9	Park Jae-Man	South Korea	7:35.52
10	Yu Tao	China	7:39.30
11	Nikolay Ulyanin	Kazakhstan	7:41.60
12	Liu Liyou	China	7:48.24

=== Day 2 ===
==== 1500 meter ====
Place	Athlete	Country	Time
1st place, gold medalist(s)	Sergey Tsybenko	Kazakhstan	1:55.36
2nd place, silver medalist(s)	Hiroyuki Noake	Japan	1:56.11
3rd place, bronze medalist(s)	Takahiro Nozaki	Japan	1:56.60
4	Liu Liyou	China	1:58.61
5	Kazuki Sawaguchi	Japan	1:59.41
6	Keiji Shirahata	Japan	1:59.51
7	Park Jae-Man	South Korea	1:59.56
8	Liu Tongyang	China	1:59.63
9	Mun Jun	South Korea	2:00.77
10	Liu Guangbin	China	2:00.90
11	Yu Tao	China	2:03.58

=== Allround Results ===
Place	Athlete	Country	500m	5000m	1500m	points
1st place, gold medalist(s)	Hiroyuki Noake	Japan	37.72 (1)	7:14.71 (4)	1:56.11 (2)	119.894
2nd place, silver medalist(s)	Sergey Tsybenko	Kazakhstan	38.92 (3)	7:14.37 (3)	1:55.36 (1)	120.810
3rd place, bronze medalist(s)	Keiji Shirahata	Japan	39.21 (6)	7:02.12 (1)	1:59.51 (6)	121.258
4	Takahiro Nozaki	Japan	39.61 (7)	7:07.83 (2)	1:56.60 (3)	121.259
5	Mun Jun	South Korea	39.12 (5)	7:22.04 (6)	2:00.77 (9)	123.580
6	Liu Guangbin	China	39.63 (8)	7:21.33 (5)	2:00.90 (10)	124.063
7	Liu Tongyang	China	39.83 (10)	7:24.91 (7)	1:59.63 (8)	124.197
8	Kazuki Sawaguchi	Japan	39.81 (9)	7:26.84 (8)	1:59.41 (5)	124.261
9	Park Jae-Man	South Korea	38.90 (2)	7:35.52 (9)	1:59.56 (7)	124.305
10	Liu Liyou	China	39.00 (4)	7:48.24 (12)	1:58.61 (4)	125.360
11	Yu Tao	China	40.27 (11)	7:39.30 (10)	2:03.58 (11)	127.393
NC12	Nikolay Ulyanin	Kazakhstan	1:09.18 (12)	7:41.60 (11)		115.340
