= 1999 World Allround Speed Skating Championships =

International speed skating competition

World Allround Speed Skating Championships
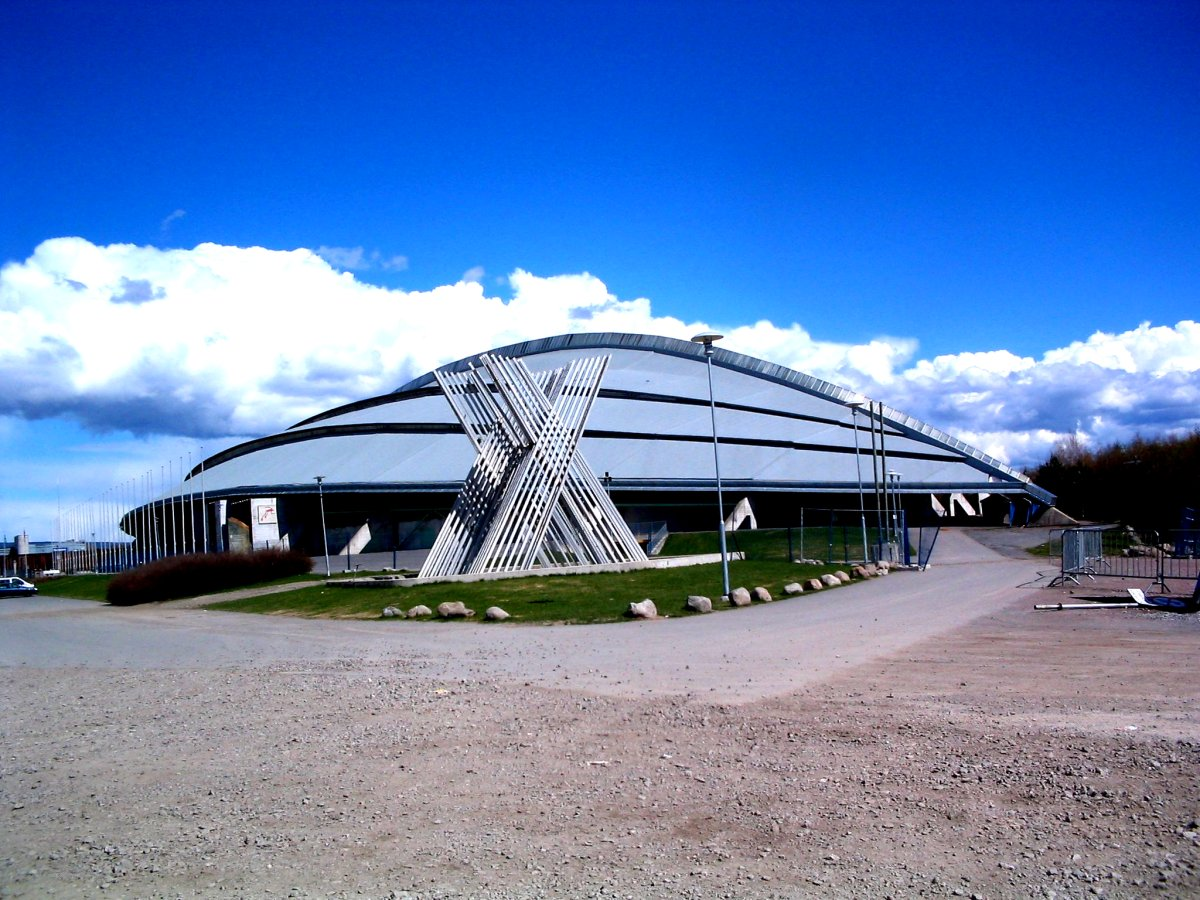
- Vikingskipet
- Venue: Vikingskipet, Hamar
- Dates: 6–7 February
- Competitors: 48 from 11 nations

Medalist men
1st place, gold medalist(s)		Rintje Ritsma	NED
2nd place, silver medalist(s)		Vadim Sayutin	RUS
3rd place, bronze medalist(s)		Eskil Ervik	NOR

Medalist women
1st place, gold medalist(s)		Gunda Niemann-Stirnemann	GER
2nd place, silver medalist(s)		Claudia Pechstein	GER
3rd place, bronze medalist(s)		Tonny de Jong	NED

The 1999 World Allround Speed Skating Championships was held on 6–7 February 1999 in the Vikingskipet arena in Hamar, Norway.

It was the first tournament with 24 participants.

Title defenders were the 1998 world champions Gunda Niemann-Stirnemann from Germany and Ids Postma from the Netherlands.

Gunda Niemann-Stirnemann from Germany and Rintje Ritsma from the Netherlands became world champions.

== Men's championships ==
=== Allround results ===
Place	Athlete	Country	Points	500 m	5000 m	1500 m	10000 m
1st place, gold medalist(s)	Rintje Ritsma	Netherlands	**152.651 WR**	36.51 (4)	6:30.38 (6)	1:48.69 (2)	13:37.47 (4)
2nd place, silver medalist(s)	Vadim Sayutin	Russia	153.360	37.71 (14)	**6:27.50 (1)**	1:49.32 (4)	13:29.21 (2)
3rd place, bronze medalist(s)	Eskil Ervik	Norway	154.176	37.54 (13)	6:29.22 (2)	1:49.59 (5)	13:43.68 (6)
4	Roberto Sighel	Italy	154.238	37.25 (9)	6:30.28 (4)	1:50.28 (10)	13:44.01 (7)
5	Bart Veldkamp	Belgium	154.808	38.10 (20)	6:31.45 (7)	1:51.46 (18)	**13:28.20 (1)**
6	Ådne Søndrål	Norway	154.809	36.43 (3)	6:40.53 (18)	**1:47.01 (1)**	14:13.13 (12)
7	Martin Hersman	Netherlands	155.000	36.63 (6)	6:39.56 (13)	1:49.03 (3)	14:01.42 (9)
8	Christian Breuer	Germany	155.034	**36.29 (1)**	6:40.74 (19)	1:49.74 (7)	14:01.80 (10)
9	K. C. Boutiette	United States	155.710	36.76 (7)	6:39.34 (12)	1:49.99 (9)	14:07.06 (11)
10	Frank Dittrich	Germany	155.926	38.73 (23)	6:30.35 (5)	1:52.55 (22)	13:32.91 (3)
11	Steven Elm	Canada	156.048	37.83 (17)	6:36.56 (9)	1:49.91 (8)	13:58.52 (8)
12	Kjell Storelid	Norway	156.147	38.86 (24)	6:30.05 (3)	1:52.19 (21)	13:37.73 (5)
NQ13	Kevin Marshall	Canada	113.211	36.62 (5)	6:40.45 (16)	1:49.64 (6)	
NQ14	Takahiro Nozaki	Japan	114.376	37.48 (10)	6:39.63 (14)	1:50.80 (13)	
NQ15	Dmitry Shepel	Russia	114.458	37.77 (15)	6:37.78 (10)	1:50.73 (11)	
NQ16	Keiji Shirahata	Japan	114.508	37.51 (11)	6:40.52 (17)	1:50.84 (14)	
NQ17	Marnix ten Kortenaar	Austria	114.674	38.17 (21)	6:35.88 (8)	1:50.75 (12)	
NQ18	Mamoru Ishioka	Japan	114.669	37.10 (8)	6:42.09 (21)	1:52.08 (19)	
NQ19	Dustin Molicki	Canada	115.208	38.31 (22)	6:39.32 (11)	1:50.90 (15)	
NQ20	Derek Parra	United States	115.209	37.51 (11)	6:46.36 (23)	1:51.19 (17)	
NQ21	Dominique Gravel	Canada	115.645	38.06 (19)	6:42.25 (22)	1:52.08 (19)	
NQ22	Stefano Donagrandi	Italy	115.751	37.95 (18)	6:40.81 (20)	1:53.16 (23f)	
NQ23	Hiroyuki Noake	Japan	128.597	36.29 (1)	6:39.71 (15)	2:37.01 (24f)	
DQ2	Maurizio De Monte	Italy	74.843	37.80 (16)	6:47.09 (DQ)	1:51.13 (16)	

NQ = Not qualified for the 10000 m (only the best 12 are qualified)
DQ = disqualified
bold signifies championship record.

== Women's championships ==
=== Allround results ===
Place	Athlete	Country	Points	500 m	3000 m	1500 m	5000 m
1st place, gold medalist(s)	Gunda Niemann-Stirnemann	Germany	**161.479 WR**	40.34 (7)	**4:02.01 (1)**	1:57.24 (2)	**6:57.24 (1) WR**
2nd place, silver medalist(s)	Claudia Pechstein	Germany	162.935	40.50 (8)	4:04.46 (2)	1:57.92 (4)	7:03.86 (2)
3rd place, bronze medalist(s)	Tonny de Jong	Netherlands	163.780	39.96 (4)	4:08.98 (4)	1:58.22 (5)	7:09.18 (4)
4	Annamarie Thomas	Netherlands	164.411	39.82 (1)	4:11.45 (8)	**1:56.96 (1)**	7:16.97 (8)
5	Emese Hunyady	Austria	164.885	39.93 (3)	4:10.89 (6)	1:57.51 (3)	7:19.70 (9)
6	Barbara de Loor	Netherlands	165.043	40.79 (13)	4:08.69 (3)	1:59.95 (10)	7:08.22 (3)
7	Maki Tabata	Japan	165.090	40.11 (6)	4:09.49 (5)	1:59.26 (9)	7:16.46 (5)
8	Varvara Barysheva	Russia	165.873	39.99 (5)	4:12.62 (11)	1:58.84 (7)	7:21.67 (11)
9	Jennifer Rodriguez	United States	166.022	39.86 (2)	4:13.10 (14)	1:59.15 (8)	7:22.63 (12)
10	Lyudmila Prokasheva	Kazakhstan	166.333	41.06 (16)	4:12.24 (10)	1:58.64 (6)	7:16.87 (7)
11	Anette Tønsberg	Norway	167.536	40.75 (11)	4:12.98 (12)	2:01.40 (13)	7:21.57 (10)
12	Renate Groenewold	Netherlands	167.586	41.77 (21)	4:10.99 (7)	2:01.00 (12)	7:16.52 (6)
NQ13	Cindy Overland	Canada	122.977	40.64 (10)	4:13.03 (13)	2:00.50 (11)	
NQ14	Daniela Anschütz	Germany	123.704	40.98 (14)	4:13.55 (16)	2:01.40 (13)	
NQ15	Nami Nemoto	Japan	124.066	41.55 (19)	4:11.50 (9)	2:01.80 (15)	
NQ16	Eriko Seo	Japan	124.178	41.04 (15)	4:14.19 (17)	2:02.32 (17)	
NQ17	Chiharu Nozaki	Japan	124.258	40.52 (9)	4:18.63 (20)	2:01.90 (16)	
NQ18	Ulrike Adeberg	Germany	124.285	41.18 (18)	4:13.47 (15)	2:02.58 (18)	
NQ19	Kristina Groves	Canada	125.141	41.65 (20)	4:15.59 (18)	2:02.68 (19)	
NQ20	Emese Dörfler-Antal	Austria	125.490	40.78 (12)	4:22.68 (22)	2:02.79 (20)	
NQ21	Catherine Raney	United States	126.291	42.54 (22)	4:16.65 (19)	2:02.93 (21)	
NQ22	Anna Saveljeva	Russia	126.439	41.14 (17)	4:24.88 (24)	2:03.46 (22)	
NQ23	Nicole Slot	Canada	128.166	42.89 (24)	4:20.16 (21)	2:05.75 (24)	
NQ24	Sarah Shapiro	United States	128.587	42.84 (23)	4:23.47 (23)	2:05.51 (23)	

NQ = Not qualified for the 5000 m (only the best 12 are qualified)
DQ = disqualified
bold signifies championship record.

== Rules ==
All 24 participating skaters are allowed to skate the first three distances; 12 skaters may take part on the fourth distance. These 12 skaters are determined by taking the standings on the longest of the first three distances, as well as the samalog standings after three distances, and comparing these lists as follows:

1. Skaters among the top 12 on both lists are qualified.
2. To make up a total of 12, skaters are then added in order of their best rank on either list. Samalog standings take precedence over the longest-distance standings in the event of a tie.
