= 1999 Asian Speed Skating Championships =

Speed skating competition in Nagano, Japan

Asian Speed Skating Championships
- Venue: M-Wave (Nagano, Japan)
- Dates: 9 and 10 January 1999
- Competitors: 15 from 3 nations

Medalist men
1st place, gold medalist(s)		Hiroyuki Noake	JPN
2nd place, silver medalist(s)		Takahiro Nozaki	JPN
3rd place, bronze medalist(s)		Kazuki Sawaguchi	JPN

Medalist women
1st place, gold medalist(s)		Maki Tabata	JPN
2nd place, silver medalist(s)		Nami Nemoto	JPN
3rd place, bronze medalist(s)		Eriko Seo	JPN

The 1999 Asian Speed Skating Championships were held between 9 January and 10 January 1999 at M-Wave in Nagano, Japan.

== Women championships ==
=== Day 1 ===
==== 500 meter ====
Place	Athlete	Country	Time
1st place, gold medalist(s)	Maki Tabata	Japan	40.19
2nd place, silver medalist(s)	Chiharu Nozaki	Japan	41.08
3rd place, bronze medalist(s)	Baek Eun-Bi	South Korea	41.63
4	Eriko Seo	Japan	41.71
5	Aki Narita	Japan	41.72
6	Nami Nemoto	Japan	41.99
7	Lyudmila Prokasheva	Kazakhstan	42.34

==== 3000 meter ====
Place	Athlete	Country	Time
1st place, gold medalist(s)	Maki Tabata	Japan	4:17.90
2nd place, silver medalist(s)	Nami Nemoto	Japan	4:18.07
3rd place, bronze medalist(s)	Eriko Seo	Japan	4:20.33
4	Chiharu Nozaki	Japan	4:22.97
5	Aki Narita	Japan	4:23.41
6	Lyudmila Prokasheva	Kazakhstan	4:24.16
7	Baek Eun-Bi	South Korea	4:34.59

=== Day 2 ===
==== 1500 meter ====
Place	Athlete	Country	Time
1st place, gold medalist(s)	Maki Tabata	Japan	2:02.43
2nd place, silver medalist(s)	Eriko Seo	Japan	2:04.31
3rd place, bronze medalist(s)	Chiharu Nozaki	Japan	2:04.37
4	Nami Nemoto	Japan	2:05.53
5	Aki Narita	Japan	2:05.94
6	Lyudmila Prokasheva	Kazakhstan	2:06.35
7	Baek Eun-Bi	South Korea	2:09.09

==== 5000 meter ====
Place	Athlete	Country	Time
1st place, gold medalist(s)	Nami Nemoto	Japan	7:24.00
2nd place, silver medalist(s)	Maki Tabata	Japan	7:28.28
3rd place, bronze medalist(s)	Eriko Seo	Japan	7:29.40
4	Chiharu Nozaki	Japan	7:34.35
5	Aki Narita	Japan	7:37.57
6	Lyudmila Prokasheva	Kazakhstan	7:48.97

=== Allround Results ===
Place	Athlete	Country	500m	3000m	1500m	5000m	points
1st place, gold medalist(s)	Maki Tabata	Japan	40.19 (1)	4:17.90 (1)	2:02.43 (1)	7:28.28 (2)	168.811
2nd place, silver medalist(s)	Nami Nemoto	Japan	41.99 (6)	4:18.07 (2)	2:05.53 (4)	7:24.00 (1)	171.244
3rd place, bronze medalist(s)	Eriko Seo	Japan	41.71 (4)	4:20.33 (3)	2:04.31 (2)	7:29.40 (3)	171.474
4	Chiharu Nozaki	Japan	41.08 (2)	4:22.97 (4)	2:04.37 (3)	7:34.35 (4)	171.799
5	Aki Narita	Japan	41.72 (5)	4:23.41 (5)	2:05.94 (5)	7:37.57 (5)	173.358
6	Lyudmila Prokasheva	Kazakhstan	42.34 (7)	4:24.16 (6)	2:06.35 (6)	7:48.97 (6)	175.379
NC7	Baek Eun-Bi	South Korea	41.63 (3)	4:34.59 (7)	2:09.09 (7)		130.425

== Men championships ==
=== Day 1 ===
==== 500 meter ====
Place	Athlete	Country	Time
1st place, gold medalist(s)	Choi Jae-Bong	South Korea	36.57
2nd place, silver medalist(s)	Hiroyuki Noake	Japan	36.98
3rd place, bronze medalist(s)	Mamoru Ishioka	Japan	37.82
4	Kazuki Sawaguchi	Japan	37.93
5	Takahiro Nozaki	Japan	38.01
6	Keiji Shirahata	Japan	38.35
7	Radik Bikchentayev	Kazakhstan	38.46
8	Sergey Tsybenko	Kazakhstan	38.77

==== 5000 meter ====
Place	Athlete	Country	Time
1st place, gold medalist(s)	Hiroyuki Noake	Japan	6:45.28
2nd place, silver medalist(s)	Kazuki Sawaguchi	Japan	6:53.67
3rd place, bronze medalist(s)	Takahiro Nozaki	Japan	6:54.09
4	Keiji Shirahata	Japan	6:54.22
5	Radik Bikchentayev	Kazakhstan	6:56.85
6	Mamoru Ishioka	Japan	6:56.89
7	Choi Jae-Bong	South Korea	7:08.24
-	Sergey Tsybenko	Kazakhstan	NS

=== Day 2 ===
==== 1500 meter ====
Place	Athlete	Country	Time
1st place, gold medalist(s)	Hiroyuki Noake	Japan	1:50.61
2nd place, silver medalist(s)	Choi Jae-Bong	South Korea	1:51.69
3rd place, bronze medalist(s)	Takahiro Nozaki	Japan	1:53.22
4	Mamoru Ishioka	Japan	1:54.70
5	Radik Bikchentayev	Kazakhstan	1:54.82
6	Kazuki Sawaguchi	Japan	1:56.14
7	Keiji Shirahata	Japan	1:59.93

==== 10000 meter ====
Place	Athlete	Country	Time
1st place, gold medalist(s)	Kazuki Sawaguchi	Japan	14:04.98
2nd place, silver medalist(s)	Mamoru Ishioka	Japan	14:11.88
3rd place, bronze medalist(s)	Hiroyuki Noake	Japan	14:15.54
4	Takahiro Nozaki	Japan	14:17.96
5	Keiji Shirahata	Japan	14:20.00
6	Choi Jae-Bong	South Korea	15:17.55

=== Allround Results ===
Place	Athlete	Country	500m	5000m	1500m	10000m	points
1st place, gold medalist(s)	Hiroyuki Noake	Japan	36.98 (2)	6:45.28 (1)	1:50.61 (1)	14:15.54 (3)	157.155
2nd place, silver medalist(s)	Takahiro Nozaki	Japan	38.01 (5)	6:54.09 (3)	1:53.22 (3)	14:17.96 (4)	160.057
3rd place, bronze medalist(s)	Kazuki Sawaguchi	Japan	37.93 (4)	6:53.67 (2)	1:56.14 (6)	14:04.98 (1)	160.259
4	Mamoru Ishioka	Japan	37.82 (3)	6:56.89 (6)	1:54.70 (4)	14:11.88 (2)	160.336
5	Choi Jae-Bong	South Korea	36.57 (1)	7:08.24 (7)	1:51.69 (2)	15:17.55 (6)	162.501
6	Keiji Shirahata	Japan	38.35 (6)	6:54.22 (4)	1:59.93 (7)	14:20.00 (5)	162.748
NC7	Radik Bikchentayev	Kazakhstan	38.46 (7)	6:56.85 (5)	1:54.82 (5)		118.418
NC8	Sergey Tsybenko	Kazakhstan	38.77 (8)	NS			38.770

== See also ==
- Speed skating at the 1999 Asian Winter Games
