= 2001 Asian Speed Skating Championships =

Speed skating competition in Harbin, China

Asian Speed Skating Championships
- Venue: Heilongjiang Indoor Rink (Harbin, China PR)
- Dates: 2 and 3 December 2000
- Competitors: 21 from 5 nations

Medalist men
| 1st place, gold medalist(s) | | Keiji Shirahata | JPN |
| 2nd place, silver medalist(s) | | Hiroyuki Noake | JPN |
| 3rd place, bronze medalist(s) | | Toshihiko Itokawa | JPN |

Medalist women
| 1st place, gold medalist(s) | | Maki Tabata | JPN |
| 2nd place, silver medalist(s) | | Nami Nemoto | JPN |
| 3rd place, bronze medalist(s) | | Song Li | CHN |

The 2001 Asian Speed Skating Championships were held between 2 December and 3 December 2000 at Heilongjiang Indoor Rink in Harbin, China PR.

== Women championships ==
=== Day 1 ===
==== 500 meter ====
| Place | Athlete | Country | Time |
|---|---|---|---|
| 1st place, gold medalist(s) | Song Li | China | 40.19 |
| 2nd place, silver medalist(s) | Maki Tabata | Japan | 40.36 |
| 3rd place, bronze medalist(s) | Gao Yang | China | 41.00 |
| 4 | Nami Nemoto | Japan | 41.19 |
| 5 | Kanae Kobayashi | Japan | 41.24 |
| 6 | Eriko Seo | Japan | 41.27 |
| 7 | Zhang Xiaolei | China | 41.88 |
| 8 | Yayoi Nagaoka | Japan | 41.99 |
| 9 | Baek Eun-Bi | South Korea | 42.15 |
| 10 | Yoon Hee-Jun | South Korea | 42.67 |
| 11 | Ko Hyon-Suk | North Korea | 43.13 |

==== 3000 meter ====
| Place | Athlete | Country | Time |
|---|---|---|---|
| 1st place, gold medalist(s) | Maki Tabata | Japan | 4:16.72 |
| 2nd place, silver medalist(s) | Nami Nemoto | Japan | 4:18.14 |
| 3rd place, bronze medalist(s) | Eriko Seo | Japan | 4:18.76 |
| 4 | Song Li | China | 4:20.06 |
| 5 | Kanae Kobayashi | Japan | 4:26.02 |
| 6 | Zhang Xiaolei | China | 4:26.91 |
| 7 | Yoon Hee-Jun | South Korea | 4:30.16 |
| 8 | Yayoi Nagaoka | Japan | 4:30.94 |
| 9 | Baek Eun-Bi | South Korea | 4:31.77 |
| 10 | Gao Yang | China | 4:34.63 |
| 11 | Ko Hyon-Suk | North Korea | 4:39.89 |

=== Day 2 ===
==== 1500 meter ====
| Place | Athlete | Country | Time |
|---|---|---|---|
| 1st place, gold medalist(s) | Maki Tabata | Japan | 2:01.72 |
| 2nd place, silver medalist(s) | Song Li | China | 2:02.78 |
| 3rd place, bronze medalist(s) | Nami Nemoto | Japan | 2:02.94 |
| 4 | Eriko Seo | Japan | 2:05.93 |
| 5 | Kanae Kobayashi | Japan | 2:06.14 |
| 6 | Zhang Xiaolei | China | 2:07.30 |
| 7 | Yoon Hee-Jun | South Korea | 2:08.19 |
| 8 | Yayoi Nagaoka | Japan | 2:09.31 |
| 9 | Baek Eun-Bi | South Korea | 2:10.45 |
| 10 | Gao Yang | China | 2:10.95 |
| 11 | Ko Hyon-Suk | North Korea | 2:12.38 |

==== 5000 meter ====
| Place | Athlete | Country | Time |
|---|---|---|---|
| 1st place, gold medalist(s) | Nami Nemoto | Japan | 7:20.20 |
| 2nd place, silver medalist(s) | Maki Tabata | Japan | 7:24.54 |
| 3rd place, bronze medalist(s) | Eriko Seo | Japan | 7:27.63 |
| 4 | Song Li | China | 7:30.39 |
| 5 | Kanae Kobayashi | Japan | 7:39.88 |
| 6 | Zhang Xiaolei | China | 7:48.42 |
| 7 | Yoon Hee-Jun | South Korea | 7:49.18 |
| 8 | Gao Yang | China | 7:58.25 |
| 9 | Ko Hyon-Suk | North Korea | 8:00.41 |
| 10 | Yayoi Nagaoka | Japan | 8:02.93 |
| - | Baek Eun-Bi | South Korea | NS |

=== Allround Results ===
| Place | Athlete | Country | 500m | 3000m | 1500m | 5000m | points |
|---|---|---|---|---|---|---|---|
| 1st place, gold medalist(s) | Maki Tabata | Japan | 40.36 (2) | 4:16.72 (1) | 2:01.72 (1) | 7:24.54 (2) | 168.173 |
| 2nd place, silver medalist(s) | Nami Nemoto | Japan | 41.19 (4) | 4:18.14 (2) | 2:02.94 (3) | 7:20.20 (1) | 169.213 |
| 3rd place, bronze medalist(s) | Song Li | Japan | 40.19 (1) | 4:20.06 (4) | 2:02.78 (2) | 7:30.39 (4) | 169.498 |
| 4 | Eriko Seo | Japan | 41.27 (6) | 4:18.76 (3) | 2:05.93 (4) | 7:27.63 (3) | 171.135 |
| 5 | Kanae Kobayashi | Japan | 41.24 (5) | 4:26.02 (5) | 2:06.14 (5) | 7:39.88 (5) | 173.610 |
| 6 | Zhang Xiaolei | China | 41.88 (7) | 4:26.91 (6) | 2:07.30 (6) | 7:48.42 (6) | 175.640 |
| 7 | Yoon Hee-Jun | South Korea | 42.67 (10) | 4:30.16 (7) | 2:08.19 (7) | 7:49.18 (7) | 177.344 |
| 8 | Gao Yang | China | 41.00 (3) | 4:34.63 (10) | 2:10.95 (10) | 7:58.25 (8) | 178.246 |
| 9 | Yayoi Nagaoka | Japan | 41.99 (8) | 4:30.94 (8) | 2:09.31 (8) | 8:02.93 (10) | 178.542 |
| 10 | Ko Hyon-Suk | North Korea | 43.13 (11) | 4:39.89 (11) | 2:12.38 (11) | 8:00.41 (9) | 181.945 |
| NC11 | Baek Eun-Bi | South Korea | 42.15 (9) | 4:31.77 (9) | 2:10.45 (9) | | 130.928 |

== Men championships ==
=== Day 1 ===
==== 500 meter ====
| Place | Athlete | Country | Time |
|---|---|---|---|
| 1st place, gold medalist(s) | Hiroyuki Noake | Japan | 37.19 |
| 2nd place, silver medalist(s) | Keiji Shirahata | Japan | 37.46 |
| 3rd place, bronze medalist(s) | Sergey Tsybenko | Kazakhstan | 37.56 |
| 4 | Takahiro Nozaki | Japan | 37.82 |
| 5 | Yeo Sang-Yeop | South Korea | 38.07 |
| 6 | Liu Tongyang | China | 38.14 |
| 7 | Liu Guangbin | China | 38.16 |
| 8 | Mun Jun | South Korea | 38.35 |
| 9 | Toshihiko Itokawa | Japan | 39.23 |
| 10 | Kesato Miyazaki | Japan | 39.26 |

==== 5000 meter ====
| Place | Athlete | Country | Time |
|---|---|---|---|
| 1st place, gold medalist(s) | Keiji Shirahata | Japan | 6:43.09 |
| 2nd place, silver medalist(s) | Toshihiko Itokawa | Japan | 6:47.51 |
| 3rd place, bronze medalist(s) | Kesato Miyazaki | Japan | 6:52.28 |
| 4 | Liu Guangbin | China | 6:55.93 |
| 5 | Sergey Tsybenko | Kazakhstan | 6:56.35 |
| 6 | Hiroyuki Noake | Japan | 6:57.03 |
| 7 | Liu Tongyang | China | 6:57.99 |
| 8 | Takahiro Nozaki | Japan | 7:00.05 |
| 9 | Yeo Sang-Yeop | South Korea | 7:00.27 |
| 10 | Mun Jun | South Korea | 7:01.58 |

=== Day 2 ===
==== 1500 meter ====
| Place | Athlete | Country | Time |
|---|---|---|---|
| 1st place, gold medalist(s) | Hiroyuki Noake | Japan | 1:51.65 |
| 2nd place, silver medalist(s) | Keiji Shirahata | Japan | 1:52.55 |
| 3rd place, bronze medalist(s) | Sergey Tsybenko | Kazakhstan | 1:53.67 |
| 4 | Takahiro Nozaki | Japan | 1:54.28 |
| 5 | Toshihiko Itokawa | Japan | 1:54.30 |
| 6 | Liu Tongyang | China | 1:54.42 |
| 7 | Yeo Sang-Yeop | South Korea | 1:55.14 |
| 8 | Liu Guangbin | China | 1:55.71 |
| 9 | Kesato Miyazaki | Japan | 1:56.26 |
| 10 | Mun Jun | South Korea | 1:56.30 |

==== 10000 meter ====
| Place | Athlete | Country | Time |
|---|---|---|---|
| 1st place, gold medalist(s) | Keiji Shirahata | Japan | 14:10.14 |
| 2nd place, silver medalist(s) | Toshihiko Itokawa | Japan | 14:12.07 |
| 3rd place, bronze medalist(s) | Kesato Miyazaki | Japan | 14:21.45 |
| 4 | Yeo Sang-Yeop | South Korea | 14:30.97 |
| 5 | Takahiro Nozaki | Japan | 14:34.33 |
| 6 | Hiroyuki Noake | Japan | 14:38.54 |
| 7 | Mun Jun | South Korea | 14:42.76 |
| 8 | Sergey Tsybenko | Kazakhstan | 14:43.85 |
| 9 | Liu Guangbin | China | 14:47.79 |
| 10 | Liu Tongyang | China | 14:51.02 |

=== Allround Results ===
| Place | Athlete | Country | 500m | 5000m | 1500m | 10000m | points |
|---|---|---|---|---|---|---|---|
| 1st place, gold medalist(s) | Keiji Shirahata | Japan | 37.46 (2) | 6:43.09 (1) | 1:52.55 (2) | 14:10.14 (1) | 157.792 |
| 2nd place, silver medalist(s) | Hiroyuki Noake | Japan | 37.19 (1) | 6:57.03 (6) | 1:51.65 (1) | 14:38.54 (6) | 160.036 |
| 3rd place, bronze medalist(s) | Toshihiko Itokawa | Japan | 39.23 (9) | 6:47.51 (2) | 1:54.30 (5) | 14:12.07 (2) | 160.684 |
| 4 | Sergey Tsybenko | Kazakhstan | 37.56 (3) | 6:56.35 (5) | 1:53.67 (3) | 14:43.85 (8) | 161.277 |
| 5 | Takahiro Nozaki | Japan | 37.82 (4) | 7:00.05 (8) | 1:54.28 (4) | 14:34.33 (5) | 161.634 |
| 6 | Yeo Sang-Yeop | South Korea | 38.07 (5) | 7:00.27 (9) | 1:55.14 (7) | 14:30.97 (4) | 162.025 |
| 7 | Kesato Miyazaki | Japan | 39.26 (10) | 6:52.28 (3) | 1:56.26 (9) | 14:21.45 (3) | 162.313 |
| 8 | Liu Tongyang | China | 38.14 (6) | 6:57.99 (7) | 1:54.42 (6) | 14:51.02 (10) | 162.630 |
| 9 | Liu Guangbin | China | 38.16 (7) | 6:55.93 (4) | 1:55.71 (8) | 14:47.79 (9) | 162.712 |
| 10 | Mun Jun | South Korea | 38.35 (8) | 7:01.58 (10) | 1:56.30 (10) | 14:42.76 (7) | 163.412 |
