= 1996 World Allround Speed Skating Championships =

International speed skating competition

World Allround Speed Skating Championships
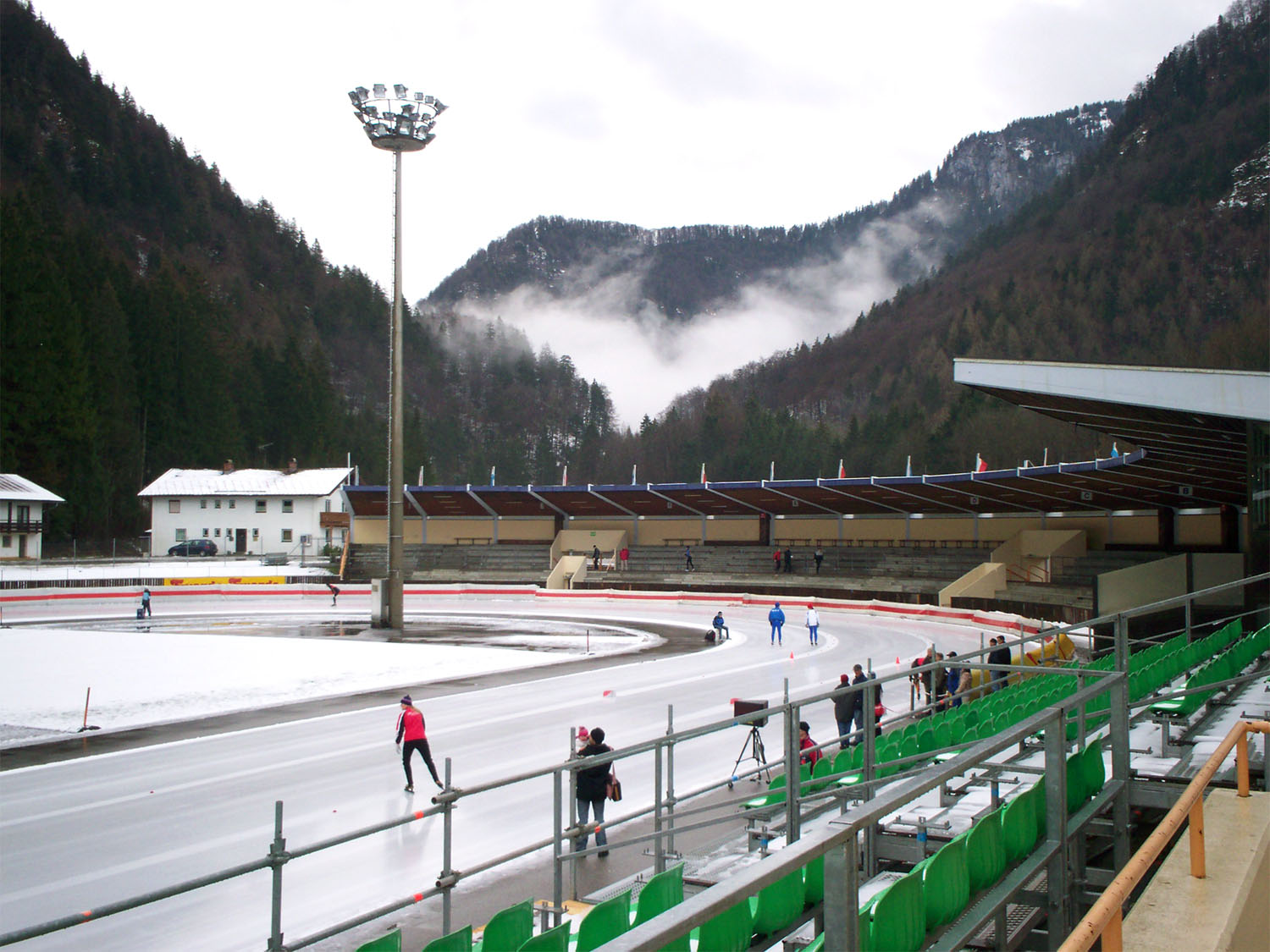
- Venue: Ludwig-Schwabl-Stadion, Inzell
- Dates: 2–4 February
- Competitors: 41 (M), 28 (W) from 24 nations

Medalist men
1st place, gold medalist(s)		Rintje Ritsma	NED
2nd place, silver medalist(s)		Ids Postma	NED
3rd place, bronze medalist(s)		Keiji Shirahata	JPN

Medalist women
1st place, gold medalist(s)		Gunda Niemann	GER
2nd place, silver medalist(s)		Claudia Pechstein	GER
3rd place, bronze medalist(s)		Mie Uehara	JPN

The 1996 World Allround Speed Skating Championships were held on 14–16 February 1997 in the Ludwig-Schwabl-Stadion stadium in Inzell, Germany. This was the first World Championships where men and women competed at the same time and venue.

Title defenders were the 1995 world champions Gunda Niemann from Germany and Rintje Ritsma from the Netherlands. Both prolongated their titles.

== Allround results ==
=== Men ===
Place	Athlete	Country	Points	500 m	5000 m	1500 m	10000 m
1st place, gold medalist(s)	Rintje Ritsma	Netherlands	160.299	37.73 (3)	6:52.34 (2)	1:54.66 (3)	14:22.30 (1)
2nd place, silver medalist(s)	Ids Postma	Netherlands	160.459	37.59 (2)	6:54.05 (3)	1:54.32 (2)	14:27.17 (2)
3rd place, bronze medalist(s)	Keiji Shirahata	Japan	161.714	37.80 (4)	6:55.83 (5)	1:55.25 (6)	14:38.31 (5)
4	Hiroyuki Noake	Japan	162.126	37.10 (1)	7:06.99 (14)	1:53.92 (1)	14:47.09 (7)
5	K. C. Boutiette	United States	162.258	37.84 (6)	6:58.41 (7)	1:55.19 (5)	14:43.62 (6)
6	Martin Hersman	Netherlands	162.891	38.06 (9)	6:55.50 (4)	1:55.28 (7)	14:57.10 (10)
7	Toru Aoyanagi	Japan	163.338	38.23 (12)	7:00.13 (9)	1:55.92 (9)	14:49.10 (8)
8	Neal Marshall	Canada	163.358	37.84 (6)	7:02.34 (11)	1:55.03 (4)	14:58.82 (11)
9	Bart Veldkamp	Belgium	163.855	39.36 (24)	6:51.20 (1)	1:59.01 (18)	14:34.11 (4)
10	Frank Dittrich	Germany	164.070	39.45 (25)	6:57.31 (6)	1:58.14 (12)	14:30.18 (3)
11	Dave Tamburrino	United States	164.339	38.63 (17)	6:59.77 (8)	1:57.21 (11)	14:53.25 (9)
12	Andrey Anufriyenko	Russia	164.661	38.09 (11)	7:05.54 (13)	1:55.85 (8)	15:08.03 (12)
NQ13	Roberto Sighel	Italy	119.918	38.08 (10)	7:08.38 (15)	1:57.00 (10)	
NQ14	Davide Carta	Italy	120.799	37.80 (4)	7:15.46 (27)	1:58.36 (14)	
NQ15	Vadim Sayutin	Russia	121.339	38.76 (19)	7:11.23 (18)	1:58.37 (15)	
NQ16	Christian Breuer	Germany	121.633	37.89 (8)	7:17.70 (29)	1:59.92 (21)	
NQ17	Kevin Marshall	Canada	121.692	38.50 (15)	7:11.22 (17)	2:00.21 (22)	
NQ18	Lasse Sætre	Norway	122.349	39.74 (34)	7:03.19 (12)	2:00.87 (26)	
NQ18	Cédric Kuentz	France	122.349	39.60 (30)	7:13.03 (23)	1:58.34 (13)	
NQ20	Paweł Zygmunt	Poland	122.482	39.35 (23)	7:15.79 (28)	1:58.66 (17)	
NQ21	Cheon Ju-Hyeon	South Korea	122.977	38.44 (14)	7:30.44 (36)	1:58.48 (16)	
NQ22	Anatoli Krasheninin	Russia	122.979	39.64 (31)	7:12.06 (22)	2:00.40 (24)	
NQ23	Petter Andersen	Norway	122.988	38.43 (13)	7:26.18 (34)	1:59.82 (20)	
NQ24	Sergey Kaznacheyev	Kazakhstan	123.378	39.52 (27)	7:15.08 (26)	2:01.05 (28)	
NQ25	Vitali Novichenko	Belarus	123.435	39.47 (26)	7:14.15 (25)	2:01.65 (33)	
NQ26	Arlen Spicer	United States	123.709	39.33 (22)	7:22.49 (32)	2:00.39 (23)	
NQ27	Andrew Nicholson	New Zealand	123.740	39.52 (27)	7:19.67 (30)	2:00.76 (25)	
NQ28	Christian Eminger	Austria	123.862	41.30 (40)	7:01.82 (10)	2:01.14 (31)	
NQ29	Jonas Schön	Sweden	123.867	39.70 (32)	7:23.94 *(33)	1:59.32 (19)	
NQ30	Kim Sang-Cheol	South Korea	124.049	38.53 (16)	7:31.93 (38)	2:00.98 (27)	
NQ31	Remi Hereide	Norway	124.370	40.72 (38)	7:11.47 (20)	2:01.51 (32)	
NQ32	Adrian Stroescu	Romania	124.581	39.57 (29)	7:26.48 (35)	2:01.09 (30)	
NQ33	Vesa Rosendahl	Finland	124.588	39.70 (32)	7:21.38 (31)	2:02.25 (34)	
NQ34	Zsolt Baló	Hungary	125.195	39.03 (21)	7:38.12 (40)	2:01.06 (29)	
NQ35	Fausto Marreiros	Portugal	125.337	41.11 (39)	7:11.44 (19)	2:03.25 (37)	
NQ36	Sergij Priz	Ukraine	126.276	39.86 (35)	7:33.86 (39)	2:03.09 (36)	
NQ37	Martin Feigenwinter	Switzerland	126.566	41.93 (41)	7:08.70 (16)	2:05.30 (39)	
NQ38	Sergey Surgutanov	Kazakhstan	126.849	40.19 (36)	7:38.39 (41)	2:02.46 (35)	
NQ39	Bernhard Laimgruber	Austria	126.970	40.59 (37)	7:30.87 (37)	2:03.88 (38)	
NQ40	Mark Knoll	Canada	133.928	39.01 (20)	7:13.95 (24)	2:34.57*(40)	
NQ41	Thomas Kumm	Germany	134.043	38.62 (17)	7:11.57 (21)	2:36.80*(41)	

NQ = Not qualified for the 10000 m (only the best 12 are qualified)
NS=did not start
* = Includes a fall

=== Women ===
Place	Athlete	Country	Points	500 m	1500 m	3000 m	5000 m
1st place, gold medalist(s)	Gunda Niemann-Kleemann	Germany	173.272	41.63 (6)	2:06.13 (1)	4:22.59 (1)	7:38.34 (2)
2nd place, silver medalist(s)	Claudia Pechstein	Germany	175.465	41.91 (8)	2:09.28 (7)	4:27.96 (2)	7:38.02 (1)
3rd place, bronze medalist(s)	Mie Uehara	Japan	175.677	41.59 (5)	2:07.62 (3)	4:28.21 (3)	7:48.46 (3)
4	Annamarie Thomas	Netherlands	176.519	41.32 (2)	2:08.43 (4)	4:32.04 (7)	7:50.49 (5)
5	Tonny de Jong	Netherlands	177.511	42.06 (11)	2:09.96 (10)	4:31.04 (6)	7:49.58 (4)
6	Svetlana Bazhanova	Russia	177.777	42.35 (13)	2:07.02 (2)	4:30.08 (5)	8:00.74 (7)
7	Maki Tabata	Japan	178.698	41.96 (10)	2:09.19 (6)	4:32.13 (8)	8:03.20 (8)
8	Chiharu Nozaki	Japan	178.995	41.51 (4)	2:09.76 (9)	4:34.88 (12)	8:04.19 (9)
9	Ingrid Liepa	Canada	180.404	41.92 (9)	2:08.83 (5)	4:39.08 (14)	8:10.28 (11)
10	Heike Warnicke-Schalling	Germany	180.502	43.92 (23)	2:13.02 (22)	4:29.87 (4)	7:52.64 (6)
11	Becky Sundstrom	United States	180.746	41.31 (1)	2:10.79 (11)	4:41.09 (17)	8:09.92 (10)
12	Moira D'Andrea	United States	181.669	41.50 (3)	2:09.44 (8)	4:40.80 (16)	8:22.23 (12)
NQ13	Svetlana Vysokova	Russia	133.174	43.93 (24)	2:10.81 (12)	4:33.85 (10)	
NQ14	Mihaela Dascălu	Romania	133.244	42.72 (15)	2:13.60 (23)	4:35.95 (13)	
NQ15	Tama Sundstrom	United States	133.464	42.53 (14)	2:11.81 (14)	4:41.99 (19)	
NQ16	Emese Antal	Austria	133.605	43.05 (17)	2:11.73 (13)	4:39.87 (15)	
NQ17	Chiara Simionato	Italy	133.838	42.31 (12)	2:12.79 (18)	4:43.59 (22)	
NQ18	Elena Belci-Dal Farra	Italy	133.949	43.97 (25)	2:13.85 (24)	4:32.18 (9)	
NQ19	Cerasela Hordobețiu	Romania	134.133	42.72 (15)	2:12.79 (18)	4:42.90 (20)	
NQ20	Ewa Wasilewska-Borkowska	Poland	134.639	43.06 (18)	2:12.01 (21)	4:45.46 (24)	
NQ21	Christina Schön	Sweden	134.691	43.24 (19)	2:12.54 (17)	4:43.63 (23)	
NQ22	Svetlana Konstantinova	Ukraine	134.861	43.70 (22)	2:12.53 (16)	4:41.91 (18)	
NQ23	Anette Tønsberg	Norway	135.867	43.60 (21)	2:15.23 (25)	4:43.15 (21)	
NQ24	Olga Klyga	Belarus	137.863	43.39 (20)	2:15.93 (26)	4:54.98 (26)	
NQ25	Dana Ionescu	Romania	139.149	44.40 (26)	2:17.29 (27)	4:53.92 (25)	
NQ26	Ilonda Lūse	Latvia	141.862	45.19 (27)	2:21.59 (28)	4:56.86 (27)	
NQ27	Carla Zijlstra	Netherlands	154.294	1:04.48*(28)	2:12.44 (15)	4:34.01 (11)	
NS3	Emese Hunyady	Austria	86.040	41.76 (7)	2:12.84 (20)	NS	

NQ = Not qualified for the 5000 m (only the best 12 are qualified)
NS= Did not start
* = Includes a fall
