= 1995 Men's World Allround Speed Skating Championships =

International speed skating competition

1995 World Allround Speed Skating Championships for Men
- Venue: Ice Rink Piné, Baselga di Piné, Italy
- Dates: 11–12 February
- Competitors: 35 skaters from 19 nations

Medalist men
1st place, gold medalist(s)		Rintje Ritsma	NED
2nd place, silver medalist(s)		Keiji Shirahata	JPN
3rd place, bronze medalist(s)		Roberto Sighel	ITA

The 56th edition of the Men's World Allround Speed Skating Championships was held on 11 and 12 February 1995 at the Ice Rink Piné, Baselga di Piné in Italy.

The field consisted of 35 speed skaters from 19 countries. It was the final edition held separately for men. From 1996 onward the men's and women's World Allround Speed Skating Championships would be combined into a single tournament.

Rintje Ritsma won the world title ahead of Keiji Shirahata and Roberto Sighel. It was his first world title. From 1996 onward, the men's and women's World Allround Speed Skating Championships took place on the same days and at the same venue.

== Distance medals ==
Distance	Gold (gold)	Silver (silver)	Bronze (bronze)
500m	Hiroyuki Noake	Davide Carta	Rintje Ritsma
1500m	Rintje Ritsma	Keiji Shirahata	Neal Marshall
5000m	Frank Dittrich	René Taubenrauch	Rintje Ritsma
10000m	Rintje Ritsma	Keiji Shirahata	Takahiro Nozaki

== Standings ==
Rank	Skater	Country	Points Samalog	500m	5000m	1500m	10,000m
1st place, gold medalist(s)	Rintje Ritsma	Netherlands	160.992	38.42 (3)	7:03.08 (5)	1:53.31 (gold)	14:09.89 (gold)
2nd place, silver medalist(s)	Keiji Shirahata	Japan	161.864	39.12 (13)	7:02.40 (4)	1:53.39 (2)	14:14.16 (2}
3rd place, bronze medalist(s)	Roberto Sighel	Italy	162.851	38.56 (6)	7:05.14 (10)	1:55.48 (8)	14:25.69 (5)
4	Takahiro Nozaki	Japan	163.110	39.11 (12)	7:01.84 (3)	1:56.18 (11)	14:21.80 (3)
5	Dave Tamburrino	United States	163.603	38.82 (9)	7:06.88 (14)	1:54.90 (7)	14:35.91 (7)
6	Andrej Anoefrijenko	Russia	163.614	38.55 (4)	7:05.57 (11)	1:55.85 (9)	14:37.82 (9)
7	Hiroyuki Noake	Japan	163.897	37.91 (gold)	7:17.87 (24)	1:54.13 (5)	14:43.14 (11)
8	Neal Marshall	Canada	164.132	38.74 (8)	7:13.89 (20)	1:53.86 (3)	14:41.01 (10)
9	René Taubenrauch	Germany	164.337	39.81 (21)	6:59.19 (2)	1:57.15 (15)	14:31.16 (6)
10	Frank Dittrich	Germany	164.462	40.09 (25)	6:56.66 (gold)	1:58.39 (21)	14:24.86 (4)
11	Sergey Tsybenko	Kazakhstan	164.990	39.06 (11)	7:04.67 (9)	1:55.92 (10)	14:56.46 (12)
12	Christian Eminger	Austria	167.804	41.35 (32)	7:03.95 (6)	2:00.76 (29)	14:36.13 (8)
NC13	Jeroen Straathof	Netherlands	120.301	39.34 (16)	7:07.95 (16)	1:54.50 (6)	–
NC14	Vadim Sayutin	Russia	120.951	39.23 (15)	7:09.71 (18)	1:56.25 (12)	–
NC15	Ådne Søndrål	Norway	121.308	38.86 (10)	7:24.85 (31)	1:53.89 (4)	–
NC16	K.C. Boutiette	United States	121.428	39.68 (20)	7:05.92 (12)	1:57.47 (17)	–
NC17	Kjell Storelid	Norway	121.665	40.35 (28)	7:04.35 (7)	1:56.64 (14)	–
NC18	Steinar Johansen	Norway	121.850	39.92 (24)	7:10.54 (19)	1:56.63 (13)	–
NC19	Kevin Marshall	Canada	122.029	39.13 (13)	7:16.16 (22)	1:57.85 (19)	–
NC20	Lee Kyou-hyuk	South Korea	122.604	38.55 (4)	7:26.24 (32)	1:58.29 (20)	–
NC21	Davide Carta	Italy	122.686	37.94 (2)	7:34.90 (34)	1:57.77 (18)	–
NC22	Yevgeny Sanarov	Kazakhstan	122.689	39.87 (22)	7:04.49 (8)	2:01.11 (32)	–
NC23	Uwe Tonat	Germany	123.020	39.63 (19)	7:23.37 (29)	1:57.16 (16)	–
NC24	Boris Uvarov	Ukraine	123.243	39.54 (18)	7:21.13 (26)	1:58.77 (22)	–
NC25	Paweł Zygmunt	Poland	123.365	39.51 (17)	7:22.32 (28)	1:58.87 (23)	–
NC26	Falko Zandstra	Netherlands	123.445	38.66 (7)	7:06.95 (15)	2:06.27* (35)	–
NC27	Andriy Gutovski	Ukraine	123.800	40.54 (30)	7:08.97 (17)	2:01.09 (30)	–
NC28	Andrew Nicholson	New Zealand	123.897	40.30 (26)	7:16.04 (21)	1:59.98 (26)	–
NC29	Jaromir Radke	Poland	123.911	41.63 (34)	7:06.15 (13)	7:06.15 (24)	–
NC30	Jonas Schön	Sweden	123.975	39.89 (23)	7:24.15 (30)	1:59.01 (25)	–
NC31	Vitaly Novichenko	Belarus	125.062	40.52 (29)	7:21.76 (27)	2:01.10 (31)	–
NC32	Mikko Nieminen	Finland	125.519	41.45 (33)	7:18.53 (25)	2:00.65 (28)	–
NC33	László Antal	Romania	125.898	40.30 (26)	7:34.22 (33)	2:00.53 (27)	–
NC34	Bernhard Laimgruber	Austria	126.492	40.56 (31)	7:34.92 (35)	2:01.32 (33)	–
NC35	Martin Feigenwinter	Switzerland	127.351	42.67 (35)	7:16.35 (23)	2:03.14 (34)	–

* = Fell

== See also ==
- 1995 Women's World Allround Speed Skating Championships
