= 1994 Men's World Allround Speed Skating Championships =

International speed skating competition

Men's World Allround Speed Skating Championships
- Venue: Ruddalens Idrottsplats, Gothenburg, Sweden
- Dates: 12–13 March 1994
- Competitors: 34 from 18 nations

Medalist men
1st place, gold medalist(s)		Johann Olav Koss	NOR
2nd place, silver medalist(s)		Keiji Shirahata	NED
3rd place, bronze medalist(s)		Rintje Ritsma	NED

The 55th edition of the Men's World Allround Speed Skating Championships was held on 11 and 12 March 1994 at the Ruddalens Idrottsplats in Gothenburg, Sweden.

The field consisted of 34 speed skaters from 18 countries.

Johann Olav Koss won the world title ahead of Keiji Shirahata and Roberto Sighel. It was his third world title after 1990 and 1991.

== Distance medals ==
Distance	Gold (gold)	Silver (silver)	Bronze (bronze)
500m	Ids Postma	Hiroyuki Noake	Naoki Kotake
1500m	Kjell Storelid	Johann Olav Koss	Jaromir Radke
5000m	Johann Olav Koss	Andrey Anufriyenko	Hiroyuki Noake
10000m	Johann Olav Koss	Kjell Storelid	Ids Postma

== Standings ==
Place	Name	Points	500m	5000m	1500m	10000m
1st place, gold medalist(s)	Johann Olav Koss (NOR)	167.233	39.44 (4)	7:14.21 (2)	1:59.68 (1)	14:49.58 (1)
2nd place, silver medalist(s)	Ids Postma (NED)	168.457	38.39 (3)	7:27.68 (19)	2:01.66 (6)	14:54.93 (3)
3rd place, bronze medalist(s)	Rintje Ritsma (NED)	168.566	39.38 (8)	7:18.96 (6)	2:01.25 (4)	14:57.48 (4)
4	Keiji Shirahata (JPN)	168.976	39.14 (6)	7:18.72 (5)	2:01.50 (5)	15:09.28 (6)
5	Hiroyuki Noake (JPN)	169.094	38.50 (2)	7:20.25 (8)	2:00.95 (3)	15:25.07 (10)
6	Kjell Storelid (NOR)	170.027	41.19 (26)	7:11.63 (1)	2:03.27 (13)	14:51.68 (2)
7	Andrey Anufriyenko (RUS)	170.137	38.96 (5)	7:23.89 (14)	2:00.76 (2)	15:30.70 (11)
8	Bart Veldkamp (NED)	170.323	40.19 (14)	7:20.95 (9)	2:03.48 (14)	14:57.56 (5)
9	Steinar Johansen (NOR)	170.780	39.97 (12)	7:19.40 (7)	2:02.33 (10)	15:21.89 (9)
10	Jonas Schön (SWE)	172.418	40.26 (15)	7:21.53 (10)	2:05.76 (24)	15:21.71 (8)
