= 1999 World Championships =

1999 World Championships may refer to:

- Alpine skiing: Alpine World Ski Championships 1999
- Athletics:
- 1999 World Championships in Athletics
- 1999 IAAF World Indoor Championships
  - Cross-country running: 1999 IAAF World Cross Country Championships
  - Road running: 1999 IAAF World Half Marathon Championships
- Badminton: 1999 IBF World Championships
- Bandy: 1999 Bandy World Championship
- Biathlon: Biathlon World Championships 1999
- Boxing: 1999 World Amateur Boxing Championships
- Chess: FIDE World Chess Championship 1999
- Curling:
  - 1999 World Men's Curling Championship
  - 1999 World Women's Curling Championship
- Cycling: 1999 UCI Road World Championships
- Darts:
  - 1999 BDO World Darts Championship
  - 1999 PDC World Darts Championship
- Figure skating: 1999 World Figure Skating Championships
- Ice hockey: 1999 Men's World Ice Hockey Championships
- Ice hockey: 1999 IIHF Women's World Championship
- Nordic skiing: FIS Nordic World Ski Championships 1999
- Rowing: 1999 World Rowing Championships
- Speed skating:
  - Allround: 1999 World Allround Speed Skating Championships
  - Sprint: 1999 World Sprint Speed Skating Championships
  - Single distances: 1999 World Single Distance Speed Skating Championships

== See also ==
- 1999 World Cup (disambiguation)
- 1999 Continental Championships
- 1999 World Junior Championships
