= 1995 World Allround Speed Skating Championships =

The men and women's world allround speed skating championships were held for the last time separately in 1995. The events were:

- 1995 Men's World Allround Speed Skating Championships
- 1995 Women's World Allround Speed Skating Championships
