= 2000 World Championships =

2000 World Championships may refer to:

- Alpine skiing: Alpine World Ski Championships 2000
- Aquatics: 2000 World Aquatics Championships
- Athletics: 2000 World Championships in Athletics
  - Cross-country running: 2000 IAAF World Cross Country Championships
  - Road running: 2000 IAAF World Road Running Championships
- Badminton: 2000 BWF World Championships
- Bandy: Bandy World Championship 2000
- Biathlon: Biathlon World Championships 2000
- Boxing: 2000 World Amateur Boxing Championships
- Chess: FIDE World Chess Championship 2000
- Curling:
  - 2000 World Men's Curling Championship
  - 2000 World Women's Curling Championship
- Darts: 2000 BDO World Darts Championship
- Darts: 2000 PDC World Darts Championship
- Figure skating: 2000 World Figure Skating Championships
- Football: 2000 FIFA Club World Championship
  - Futsal: 2000 FIFA Futsal World Championship
  - Beach soccer: 2000 Beach Soccer World Championship
- Ice hockey: 2000 Men's World Ice Hockey Championships
- Ice hockey: 2000 IIHF Women's World Championship
- Netball: 2000 Netball World Championships
- Nordic skiing: FIS Nordic World Ski Championships 2000
- Speed skating:
  - Allround: 2000 World Allround Speed Skating Championships
  - Sprint: 2000 World Sprint Speed Skating Championships
  - Single distances: 2000 World Single Distance Speed Skating Championships

== See also ==
- 2000 World Cup (disambiguation)
- 2000 Continental Championships (disambiguation)
- 2000 World Junior Championships (disambiguation)
