= 2000 World Cup =

2000 World Cup can refer to:

- The 2000 Rugby League World Cup
- The 2000 Women's Rugby League World Cup
- The 2000 Alpine Skiing World Cup
- 2000 Women's Cricket World Cup
- The 2000 FIFA Beach Soccer World Cup
- The 2000 FIFA Futsal World Cup
- The 2000 FIFA Club World Cup

== See also ==
- 2000 Continental Championships (disambiguation)
- 2000 World Championships (disambiguation)
- 2000 World Junior Championships (disambiguation)
