= Hiroki Hirako =

Japanese speed skater (born 1982)

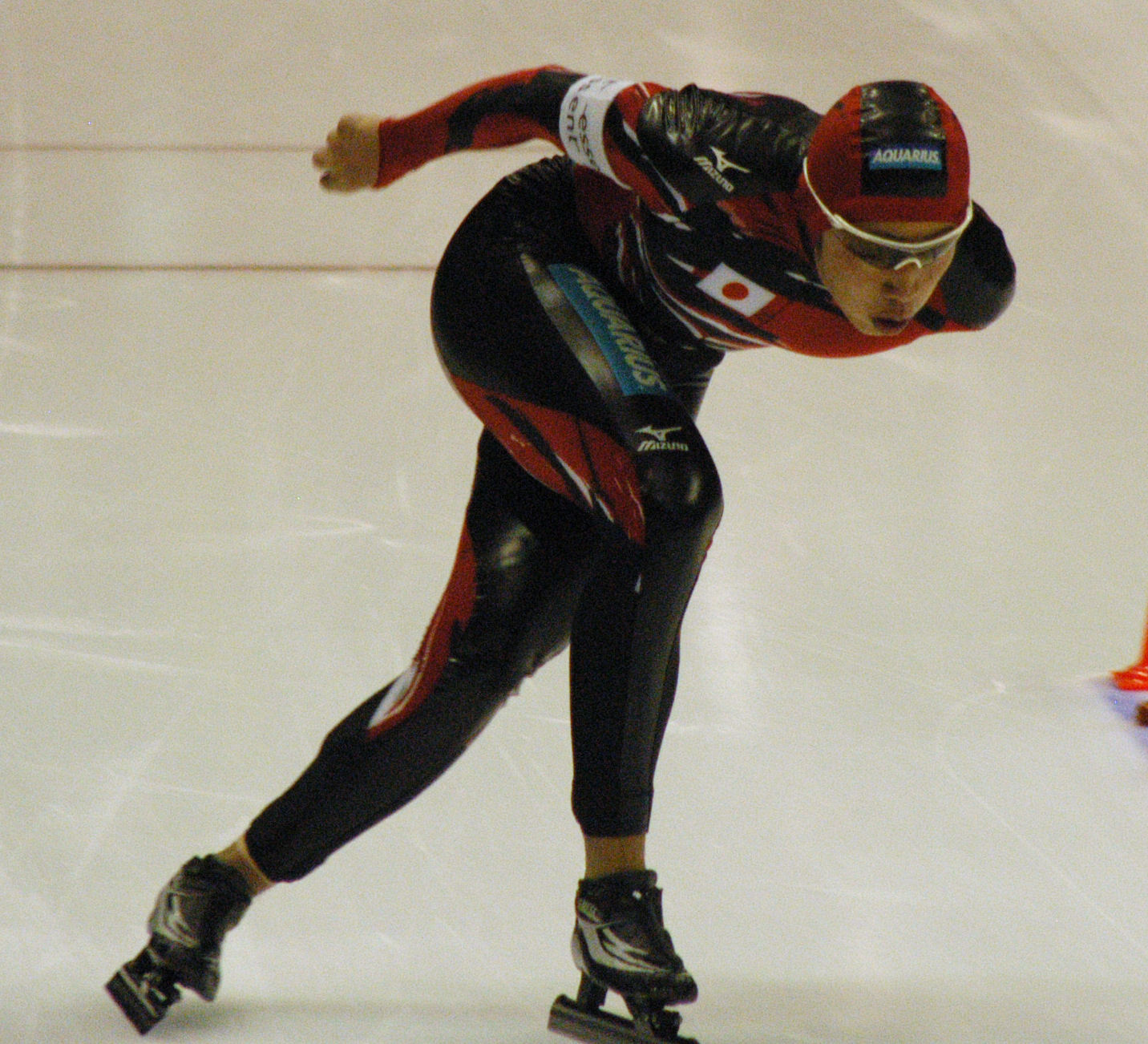
- Hirako in 2008

Personal information
- Born: 6 August 1982 (age 43) Otofuke, Hokkaido, Japan
- Height: 167 cm (5 ft 6 in)
- Weight: 60 kg (132 lb)

Sport
- Sport: Speed skating
Medal record
Men's speed skating
Representing Japan
Asian Games
Gold medal – first place	2003 Aomori	10000 m
Gold medal – first place	2007 Changchun	5000 m
Gold medal – first place	2011 Astana–Almaty	Team pursuit
Silver medal – second place	2011 Astana–Almaty	Mass start
Bronze medal – third place	2011 Astana–Almaty	5000 m
Bronze medal – third place	2011 Astana–Almaty	10000 m
Asian Championships
Gold medal – first place	2005 Ikaho	Allround
Gold medal – first place	2005 Shenyang	Allround
Silver medal – second place	2004 Chuncheon	Allround
Silver medal – second place	2007 Changchun	Allround
Silver medal – second place	2009 Tomakomai	Allround
Silver medal – second place	2010 Obihiro	Allround
Silver medal – second place	2012 Astana	Allround
Bronze medal – third place	2003 Harbin	Allround

Hiroki Hirako (平子 裕基, Hirako Hiroki; born 6 August 1982) is a Japanese speed skater. He has competed for Japan at the 2010 Winter Olympics. He has also previously competed in the 2002 Winter Olympics. He won gold medal in the 2007 Asian Winter Games.
