= World record progression small combination speed skating women =

The world record progression of the women's speed skating small combination as recognised by the International Skating Union. The small combination is the overall result of four races in one championship: 500, 1500, 3000 and 5000 meter. The overall result is calculated following the samalog system.

#	Name	Points	Date	Venue	Meet	Ref
1	(East Germany) Andrea Schöne-Mitscherlich	177.669	22-23 January 1983	Heerenveen		
2	(East Germany) Gabi Schönbrunn	174.710	14-15 January 1984	Almaty	1984 European Championships	
3	(East Germany) Andrea Schöne-Mitscherlich	171.760	23-24 March 1984	Almaty		
4	(East Germany) Karin Kania-Enke	168.271	21-22 March 1986	Almaty		
5	(Germany) Gunda Niemann	167.282	7-9 January 1994	Hamar		
6	(Germany) Gunda Niemann	165.708	14-16 February 1997	Nagano		
7	(Germany) Gunda Niemann-Stirnemann	163.020	13-15 March 1998	Heerenveen		
8	(Germany) Gunda Niemann-Stirnemann	161.479	6-7 February 1999	Hamar		
9	(Canada) Cindy Klassen	159.723	25-26 January 2003	Salt Lake City		
10	(Canada) Cindy Klassen	159.605	8-9 January 2005	Salt Lake City		
11	(Canada) Cindy Klassen	157.177	21-22 January 2006	Calgary		
12	(Canada) Cindy Klassen	154.580	18-19 March 2006	Calgary	2006 World Allround Championships	
