= 2000 Continental Championships =

2000 Continental Championships may refer to:

== African Championships ==
- Multisport: 2000 African Cup of Nations

== Asian Championships ==
- Athletics: 2000 Asian Athletics Championships
- Football (soccer): 2000 AFC Asian Cup
- Football (soccer): Asian Club Championship 1999-2000

== European Championships ==
- Athletics: 2000 European Indoor Championships in Athletics
- Figure Skating: 2000 European Figure Skating Championships
- Football (soccer): 1999–2000 UEFA Champions League
- Football (soccer): 1999–2000 UEFA Cup
- Football (soccer): UEFA Euro 2000

== Oceanian Championships ==
- Football (soccer): 2000 OFC Nations Cup
- Swimming: 2000 Oceania Swimming Championships

== Pan American Championships / North American Championships ==
- Football (soccer): CONCACAF Champions' Cup 2000

== South American Championships ==
- Football (soccer): Copa Libertadores 2000

== See also ==
- 2000 World Championships (disambiguation)
- 2000 World Junior Championships (disambiguation)
- 2000 World Cup (disambiguation)
- Continental championship (disambiguation)
