= 2010 Asian Speed Skating Championships =

Speed skating competition in Obihiro, Japan

Asian Speed Skating Championships
- Venue: Meiji Hokkaido Tokachi Oval (Obihiro, Hokkaidō)
- Dates: 9 and 10 January 2010
- Competitors: 19 from 4 nations

Medalist men
1st place, gold medalist(s)		Lee Seung-Hoon	KOR
2nd place, silver medalist(s)		Hiroki Hirako	JPN
3rd place, bronze medalist(s)		Dmitry Babenko	KAZ

Medalist women
1st place, gold medalist(s)		Masako Hozumi	JPN
2nd place, silver medalist(s)		Shiho Ishizawa	JPN
3rd place, bronze medalist(s)		Maki Tabata	JPN

The 2010 Asian Speed Skating Championships were held between 9 January and 10 January 2010 at the Meiji Hokkaido-Tokachi Oval in Obihiro, Hokkaidō.

== Women championships ==
=== Day 1 ===
==== 500 meter ====
Place	Athlete	Country	Time
1st place, gold medalist(s)	Feifei Dong	China	39.70
2nd place, silver medalist(s)	Maki Tabata	Japan	40.19
3rd place, bronze medalist(s)	Lee Ju-Youn	South Korea	40.64
4	No Seon-Yeong	South Korea	40.75
5	Shiho Ishizawa	Japan	40.89
6	Masako Hozumi	Japan	41.26
7	Chunyan Fu	China	41.55
8	Park Do-Young	South Korea	41.61
9	Eri Natori	Japan	41.85

==== 3000 meter ====
Place	Athlete	Country	Time
1st place, gold medalist(s)	Masako Hozumi	Japan	4:10.16
2nd place, silver medalist(s)	Shiho Ishizawa	Japan	4:12.90
3rd place, bronze medalist(s)	Maki Tabata	Japan	4:15.43
4	Park Do-Young	South Korea	4:16.60
5	Lee Ju-Youn	South Korea	4:17.45
6	Chunyan Fu	China	4:19.07
7	No Seon-Yeong	South Korea	4:20.88
8	Eri Natori	Japan	4:21.40
9	Feifei Dong	China	4:25.05

=== Day 2 ===
==== 1500 meter ====
Place	Athlete	Country	Time
1st place, gold medalist(s)	Maki Tabata	Japan	2:00.50
2nd place, silver medalist(s)	Masako Hozumi	Japan	2:00.56
3rd place, bronze medalist(s)	No Seon-Yeong	South Korea	2:01.90
4	Shiho Ishizawa	Japan	2:02.84
5	Lee Ju-Youn	South Korea	2:02.86
6	Feifei Dong	China	2:02.89
7	Chunyan Fu	China	2:03.20
8	Park Do-Young	South Korea	2:05.19
9	Eri Natori	Japan	2:05.77

==== 5000 meter ====
Place	Athlete	Country	Time
1st place, gold medalist(s)	Masako Hozumi	Japan	7:07.56
2nd place, silver medalist(s)	Shiho Ishizawa	Japan	7:08.97
3rd place, bronze medalist(s)	Park Do-Young	South Korea	7:23.34
4	Maki Tabata	Japan	7:27.73
5	Chunyan Fu	China	7:33.45
6	No Seon-Yeong	South Korea	7:36.14
7	Eri Natori	Japan	7:40.11
8	Feifei Dong	China	7:40.15
9	Lee Ju-Youn	South Korea	7:41.71

=== Allround Results ===
Place	Athlete	Country	500m	3000m	1500m	5000m	points
1st place, gold medalist(s)	Masako Hozumi	Japan	41.26 (6)	4:10.16 (1)	2:00.56 (2)	7:07.56 (1)	165.895
2nd place, silver medalist(s)	Shiho Ishizawa	Japan	40.89 (5)	4:12.90 (2)	2:02.84 (4)	7:08.97 (2)	166.883
3rd place, bronze medalist(s)	Maki Tabata	Japan	40.19 (2)	4:15.43 (3)	2:00.50 (1)	7:27.73 (4)	167.700
4	Park Do-Young	South Korea	41.61 (8)	4:16.60 (4)	2:05.19 (8)	7:23.34 (3)	170.440
5	No Seon-Yeong	South Korea	40.75 (4)	4:20.88 (7)	2:01.90 (3)	7:36.14 (6)	170.477
6	Lee Ju-Youn	South Korea	40.64 (3)	4:17.45 (5)	2:02.86 (5)	7:41.71 (9)	170.672
7	Feifei Dong	China	39.70 (1)	4:25.05 (9)	2:02.89 (6)	7:40.15 (8)	170.853
8	Chunyan Fu	China	41.55 (7)	4:19.07 (6)	2:03.20 (7)	7:33.45 (5)	171.139
9	Eri Natori	Japan	41.85 (9)	4:21.40 (8)	2:05.77 (9)	7:40.11 (7)	173.350

== Men championships ==
=== Day 1 ===
==== 500 meter ====
Place	Athlete	Country	Time
1st place, gold medalist(s)	Jin Xin	China	37.320
2nd place, silver medalist(s)	Sun Longjiang	China	37.324
3rd place, bronze medalist(s)	Choi Keun-Won	South Korea	37.33
4	Song Jin-Soo	South Korea	37.56
5	Katsunori Sato	Japan	37.76
6	Lee Seung-Hoon	South Korea	37.82
7	Hiroki Hirako	Japan	37.84
8	Dmitry Babenko	Kazakhstan	37.95
9	Shigeyuki Dejima	Japan	38.35
10	Maxim Baklashkin	Kazakhstan	38.72

==== 5000 meter ====
Place	Athlete	Country	Time
1st place, gold medalist(s)	Lee Seung-Hoon	South Korea	6:26.38
2nd place, silver medalist(s)	Hiroki Hirako	Japan	6:35.24
3rd place, bronze medalist(s)	Dmitry Babenko	Kazakhstan	6:37.97
4	Shigeyuki Dejima	Japan	6:42.91
5	Song Jin-Soo	South Korea	6:47.17
6	Sun Longjiang	China	6:47.92
7	Choi Keun-Won	South Korea	6:48.24
8	Katsunori Sato	Japan	6:55.13
9	Maxim Baklashkin	Kazakhstan	7:01.56
10	Jin Xin	China	7:09.49

=== Day 2 ===
==== 1500 meter ====
Place	Athlete	Country	Time
1st place, gold medalist(s)	Lee Seung-Hoon	South Korea	1:49.29
2nd place, silver medalist(s)	Song Jin-Soo	South Korea	1:50.91
3rd place, bronze medalist(s)	Sun Longjiang	China	1:51.56
4	Jin Xin	China	1:51.88
5	Hiroki Hirako	Japan	1:52.22
6	Shigeyuki Dejima	Japan	1:52.68
7	Dmitry Babenko	Kazakhstan	1:52.93
8	Maxim Baklashkin	Kazakhstan	1:54.19
9	Katsunori Sato	Japan	1:54.27
10	Choi Keun-Won	South Korea	1:55.38

==== 10000 meter ====
Place	Athlete	Country	Time
1st place, gold medalist(s)	Lee Seung-Hoon	South Korea	13:21.04
2nd place, silver medalist(s)	Hiroki Hirako	Japan	13:44.94
3rd place, bronze medalist(s)	Dmitry Babenko	Kazakhstan	13:48.18
4	Shigeyuki Dejima	Japan	14:02.71
5	Sun Longjiang	China	14:05.85
6	Song Jin-Soo	South Korea	14:10.99
7	Katsunori Sato	Japan	14:13.20
8	Maxim Baklashkin	Kazakhstan	14:30.67

=== Allround Results ===
Place	Athlete	Country	500m	5000m	1500m	10000m	points
1st place, gold medalist(s)	Lee Seung-Hoon	South Korea	37.82 (6)	6:26.38 (1)	1:49.29 (1)	13:21.04 (1)	152.940
2nd place, silver medalist(s)	Hiroki Hirako	Japan	37.84 (7)	6:35.24 (2)	1:52.22 (5)	13:44.94 (2)	156.017
3rd place, bronze medalist(s)	Dmitry Babenko	Kazakhstan	37.95 (8)	6:37.97 (3)	1:52.93 (7)	13:48.18 (3)	156.799
4	Sun Longjiang	China	37.324 (2)	6:47.92 (6)	1:51.56 (3)	14:05.85 (5)	157.590
5	Song Jin-Soo	South Korea	37.56 (4)	6:47.17 (5)	1:50.91 (2)	14:10.99 (6)	157.796
6	Shigeyuki Dejima	Japan	38.35 (9)	6:42.91 (4)	1:52.68 (6)	14:02.71 (4)	158.336
7	Katsunori Sato	Japan	37.76 (5)	6:55.13 (8)	1:54.27 (9)	14:13.20 (7)	160.023
8	Maxim Baklashkin	Kazakhstan	38.72 (10)	7:01.56 (9)	1:54.19 (8)	14:30.67 (8)	162.472
NQ9	Choi Keun-Won	South Korea	37.33 (3)	6:48.24 (7)	1:55.38 (10)		116.614
NQ10	Jin Xin	China	37.320 (1)	7:09.49 (10)	1:51.88 (4)		117.562
