= 2000 World Junior Championships =

2000 World Junior Championships may refer to:

- Athletics: 2000 World Junior Championships in Athletics
- Figure skating: 2000 World Junior Figure Skating Championships
- Ice hockey: 2000 World Junior Ice Hockey Championships
- Motorcycle speedway: 2000 Individual Speedway Junior World Championship

== See also ==
- 2000 World Cup (disambiguation)
- 2000 Continental Championships (disambiguation)
- 2000 World Championships (disambiguation)
