= Eri Natori =

Japanese speed skater (born 1985)

Personal information
- Nationality: Japanese
- Born: 23 September 1985 (age 39); Chino, Nagano, Japan

Sport
- Sport: Speed skating

Eri Natori (名取 英理, Natori Eri, born 23 September 1985) is a Japanese speed skater. She competed in the women's 3000 metres at the 2010 Winter Olympics.
