= 1999 World Cup =

1999 World Cup can refer to:

- 1999 Cricket World Cup
- 1999 Rugby World Cup
- 1999 FIFA Women's World Cup
- 1999 Alpine Skiing World Cup
- 1999 World Cup of Golf
