= 2009 Asian Speed Skating Championships =

Speed skating competition in Tomakomai, Japan

Asian Speed Skating Championships
- Venue: Tomakomai Highland Sport Center (Tomakomai, Hokkaidō)
- Dates: 4 and 5 January 2009
- Competitors: 16 from 3 nations

Medalist men
1st place, gold medalist(s)		Choi Keun-Won	KOR
2nd place, silver medalist(s)		Hiroki Hirako	JPN
3rd place, bronze medalist(s)		Dmitry Babenko	KAZ

Medalist women
1st place, gold medalist(s)		Masako Hozumi	JPN
2nd place, silver medalist(s)		Maki Tabata	JPN
3rd place, bronze medalist(s)		Yuri Obara	JPN

The 2009 Asian Speed Skating Championships were held between 4 January and 5 January 2009 at the Tomakomai Highland Sport Center in Tomakomai, Hokkaidō.

== Women championships ==
Allround

=== Day 1 ===
==== 500 meter ====
Place	Athlete	Country	Time
1st place, gold medalist(s)	Yuri Obara	Japan	41.28
2nd place, silver medalist(s)	Maki Tabata	Japan	41.97
3rd place, bronze medalist(s)	Masako Hozumi	Japan	42.71
4	Park Do-Young	South Korea	42.78
5	Lee Ju-Youn	South Korea	42.84
6	Eriko Ishino	Japan	42.90
7	Yelena Urvantseva	Kazakhstan	45.01
8	Yelena Obaturova	Kazakhstan	46.24

==== 3000 meter ====
Place	Athlete	Country	Time
1st place, gold medalist(s)	Masako Hozumi	Japan	4:17.75
2nd place, silver medalist(s)	Park Do-Young	South Korea	4:26.22
3rd place, bronze medalist(s)	Eriko Ishino	Japan	4:27.34
4	Maki Tabata	Japan	4:29.10
5	Yuri Obara	Japan	4:31.98
6	Lee Ju-Youn	South Korea	4:35.09
7	Yelena Obaturova	Kazakhstan	4:48.07
8	Yelena Urvantseva	Kazakhstan	4:54.87

=== Day 2 ===
==== 1500 meter ====
Place	Athlete	Country	Time
1st place, gold medalist(s)	Masako Hozumi	Japan	2:04.96
2nd place, silver medalist(s)	Maki Tabata	Japan	2:06.67
3rd place, bronze medalist(s)	Yuri Obara	Japan	2:08.11
4	Lee Ju-Youn	South Korea	2:10.22
5	Park Do-Young	South Korea	2:10.26
6	Eriko Ishino	Japan	2:11.42
7	Yelena Urvantseva	Kazakhstan	2:17.85
8	Yelena Obaturova	Kazakhstan	2:19.20

==== 5000 meter ====
Place	Athlete	Country	Time
1st place, gold medalist(s)	Masako Hozumi	Japan	7:22.88
2nd place, silver medalist(s)	Eriko Ishino	Japan	7:39.62
3rd place, bronze medalist(s)	Park Do-Young	South Korea	7:41.34
4	Yuri Obara	Japan	7:45.54
5	Maki Tabata	Japan	7:45.78
6	Lee Ju-Youn	South Korea	7:51.94
7	Yelena Obaturova	Kazakhstan	8:26.54
-	Yelena Urvantseva	Kazakhstan	DNS

=== Allround Results ===
Place	Athlete	Country	500m	3000m	1500m	5000m	points
1st place, gold medalist(s)	Masako Hozumi	Japan	42.71 (3)	4:17.75 (1)	2:04.96 (1)	7:22.88 (1)	171.609
2nd place, silver medalist(s)	Maki Tabata	Japan	41.97 (2)	4:29.10 (4)	2:06.67 (2)	7:45.78 (5)	175.621
3rd place, bronze medalist(s)	Yuri Obara	Japan	41.28 (1)	4:31.98 (5)	2:08.11 (3)	7:45.54 (4)	175.867
4	Park Do-Young	South Korea	42.78 (4)	4:26.22 (2)	2:10.26 (5)	7:41.34 (3)	176.704
5	Eriko Ishino	Japan	42.90 (6)	4:27.34 (3)	2:11.42 (6)	7:39.62 (2)	177.224
6	Lee Ju-Youn	South Korea	42.84 (5)	4:35.09 (6)	2:10.22 (4)	7:51.94 (6)	179.288
7	Yelena Obaturova	Kazakhstan	46.24 (8)	4:48.07 (7)	2:19.20 (8)	8:26.54 (7)	191.305
NQ8	Yelena Urvantseva	Kazakhstan	45.01 (7)	4:54.87 (8)	2:17.85 (7)	DNS	140.105

Single distances

=== Single distances results ===
Distance	1st place, gold medalist(s)	2nd place, silver medalist(s)	3rd place, bronze medalist(s)
2×500m	South Korea Oh Min-jee	Japan Maki Tsuji	Japan Chiaki Kosaka
1000m	Japan Maki Tsuji	South Korea Oh Min-jee	Japan Risa Hori
1500m	Japan Masako Hozumi	Japan Maki Tabata	Japan Hiromi Otsu
3000m	Japan Masako Hozumi	South Korea Park Do-yeong	Japan Hiromi Otsu
5000m	Japan Masako Hozumi	Japan Eriko Ishino	South Korea Park Do-yeong

== Men championships ==
=== Day 1 ===
==== 500 meter ====
Place	Athlete	Country	Time
1st place, gold medalist(s)	Yeo Sang-Yeop	South Korea	37.47
2nd place, silver medalist(s)	Choi Keun-Won	South Korea	37.98
3rd place, bronze medalist(s)	Hiroki Hirako	Japan	38.22
4	Denis Kuzin	Kazakhstan	38.45
5	Shigeyuki Dejima	Japan	38.53
6	Teppei Mori	Japan	39.02
6	Dmitry Babenko	Kazakhstan	39.02
8	Maxim Sergiyenko	Kazakhstan	41.30

==== 5000 meter ====
Place	Athlete	Country	Time
1st place, gold medalist(s)	Choi Keun-Won	South Korea	6:49.74
2nd place, silver medalist(s)	Hiroki Hirako	Japan	6:49.98
3rd place, bronze medalist(s)	Dmitry Babenko	Kazakhstan	6:57.57
4	Teppei Mori	Japan	6:59.25
5	Shigeyuki Dejima	Japan	7:07.06
6	Yeo Sang-Yeop	South Korea	7:13.53
7	Maxim Sergiyenko	Kazakhstan	7:19.59
8	Denis Kuzin	Kazakhstan	7:29.96

=== Day 2 ===
==== 1500 meter ====
Place	Athlete	Country	Time
1st place, gold medalist(s)	Choi Keun-Won	South Korea	1:53.85
2nd place, silver medalist(s)	Hiroki Hirako	Japan	1:54.98
3rd place, bronze medalist(s)	Yeo Sang-Yeop	South Korea	1:55.54
4	Dmitry Babenko	Kazakhstan	1:55.96
5	Denis Kuzin	Kazakhstan	1:57.09
6	Teppei Mori	Japan	1:57.82
7	Shigeyuki Dejima	Japan	2:00.27
8	Maxim Sergiyenko	Kazakhstan	2:04.10

==== 10000 meter ====
Place	Athlete	Country	Time
1st place, gold medalist(s)	Hiroki Hirako	Japan	14:16.63
2nd place, silver medalist(s)	Choi Keun-Won	South Korea	14:19.15
3rd place, bronze medalist(s)	Dmitry Babenko	Kazakhstan	14:26.31
4	Teppei Mori	Japan	14:35.50
5	Maxim Sergiyenko	Kazakhstan	15:05.94
6	Shigeyuki Dejima	Japan	15:27.07
	Yeo Sang-Yeop	South Korea	withdraw
	Denis Kuzin	Kazakhstan	withdraw

=== Allround Results ===
Place	Athlete	Country	500m	5000m	1500m	10000m	points
1st place, gold medalist(s)	Choi Keun-Won	South Korea	37.98 (2)	6:49.74 (1)	1:53.85 (1)	14:19.15 (2)	159.861
2nd place, silver medalist(s)	Hiroki Hirako	Japan	38.22 (3)	6:49.98 (2)	1:54.98 (2)	14:16.63 (1)	160.375
3rd place, bronze medalist(s)	Dmitry Babenko	Kazakhstan	39.02 (6)	6:57.57 (3)	1:55.96 (4)	14:26.31 (3)	162.745
4	Teppei Mori	Japan	39.02 (6)	6:59.25 (4)	1:57.82 (6)	14:35.50 (4)	163.993
5	Shigeyuki Dejima	Japan	38.53 (5)	7:07.06 (5)	2:00.27 (7)	15:27.07 (6)	167.679
6	Maxim Sergiyenko	Kazakhstan	41.30 (8)	7:19.59 (7)	2:04.10 (8)	15:05.94 (5)	171.922
NQ7	Yeo Sang-Yeop	South Korea	37.47 (1)	7:13.53 (6)	1:55.54 (3)	withdraw	119.336
NQ8	Denis Kuzin	Kazakhstan	38.45 (4)	7:29.96 (8)	1:57.09 (5)	withdraw	122.476
