= Yayoi Nagaoka =

Japanese speed skater (born 1974)

Personal information
- Nationality: Japanese
- Born: 16 March 1974 (age 51); Tomakomai, Hokkaido, Japan

Sport
- Sport: Speed skating

Yayoi Nagaoka (長岡 弥生, Nagaoka Yayoi, born 16 March 1974) is a Japanese speed skater. She competed in the women's 1500 metres at the 2002 Winter Olympics.
