= Rintje Ritsma =

Dutch speed skater

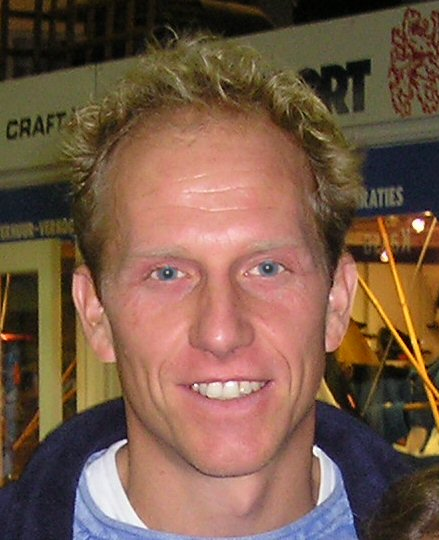
- Rintje Ritsma in 2006

Personal information
- Nickname: Beer van Lemmer
- Nationality: Dutch
- Born: 13 April 1970 (age 56) Lemmer, Netherlands
- Height: 1.89 m (6 ft 2 in)
- Weight: 93 kg (205 lb)
- Website: www.rintjeritsma.nl

Sport
- Country: Netherlands
- Sport: Speed skating
- Turned pro: 1988
- Retired: 2008

Achievements and titles
- Personal best(s): 500 m: 35.90 (1999); 1000 m: 1:10.19 (1999); 1500 m: 1:45.86 (2002); 3000 m: 3:49.29 (2004); 5000 m: 6:20.26 (2005); 10 000 m: 13:28.19 (1998)
Medal record
Speed skating
Representing Netherlands
Event	1st	2nd	3rd
Olympic Games	0	2	4
World Allround	4	2	3
World Distance	2	2	1
European Allround	6	2	2
Total	12	8	10
Olympic Games
Silver medal – second place	1994 Lillehammer	1,500 m
Silver medal – second place	1998 Nagano	5,000 m
Bronze medal – third place	1994 Lillehammer	5,000 m
Bronze medal – third place	1998 Nagano	1,500 m
Bronze medal – third place	1998 Nagano	10,000m
Bronze medal – third place	2006 Turin	Team pursuit
World Allround Championships
Gold medal – first place	1995 Baselga di Pinè	allround
Gold medal – first place	1996 Inzell	allround
Gold medal – first place	1999 Hamar	allround
Gold medal – first place	2001 Budapest	allround
Silver medal – second place	1998 Heerenveen	allround
Silver medal – second place	2003 Gothenburg	allround
Bronze medal – third place	1993 Hamar	allround
Bronze medal – third place	1994 Gothenburg	allround
Bronze medal – third place	2000 Milwaukee	allround
World Single Distance Championships
Gold medal – first place	1997 Warsaw	1,500 m
Gold medal – first place	1997 Warsaw	5,000 m
Silver medal – second place	1998 Calgary	5,000 m
Silver medal – second place	1997 Warsaw	10,000m
Bronze medal – third place	1999 Heerenveen	1,500 m
European Allround Championships
Gold medal – first place	1994 Hamar	allround
Gold medal – first place	1995 Heerenveen	allround
Gold medal – first place	1996 Heerenveen	allround
Gold medal – first place	1998 Helsinki	allround
Gold medal – first place	1999 Heerenveen	allround
Gold medal – first place	2000 Hamar	allround
Silver medal – second place	1997 Heerenveen	allround
Silver medal – second place	2003 Heerenveen	allround
Bronze medal – third place	1992 Heerenveen	allround
Bronze medal – third place	1993 Heerenveen	allround

Robert Rintje Ritsma (born 13 April 1970) is a Dutch former long track speed skater. His nickname is the Beer van Lemmer, which translates to the "Bear from Lemmer", analogous to Igor Zhelezovski's nickname "The Bear from Minsk", both of which are in reference to their imposing physical appearance.

He appeared in the Dutch version of The Masked Singer as the Springbok.

In October 2022 Ritsma started as the Dutch national speed skating coach of the team pursuit, team sprint, and the mass start.

== Speed skating career ==
He has won the World Allround Championships 4 times. He won this title in 1995, 1996, 1999 and 2001; he was second in 1998 and 2003; he was third in 1993, 1994 and 2000.

He has won the European Allround Championships a record 6 times: 1994-1996 and 1998-2000.

He participated in five Winter Olympics, winning two silver and four bronze medals, from the 1994, 1998 and 2006 Games.

He also stood at the top of the alltime world ranking, the Adelskalender, for a long time (1,125 days in total).

== Records ==
=== World records ===
Over the course of his career, Ritsma skated 4 world records:

Event	Result	Date	Location	Notes
1500 meter	1:51.60	8 January 1994	Hamar	World record until 16 February 1994
Big combination	156.201	9 January 1994	Hamar	World record until 4 January 1998
1500 meter	1:48.88	20 December 1997	Heerenveen	World record until 12 February 1998
Big combination	152.651	7 February 1999	Hamar	World record until 17 March 2002

Source: SpeedSkatingStats.com

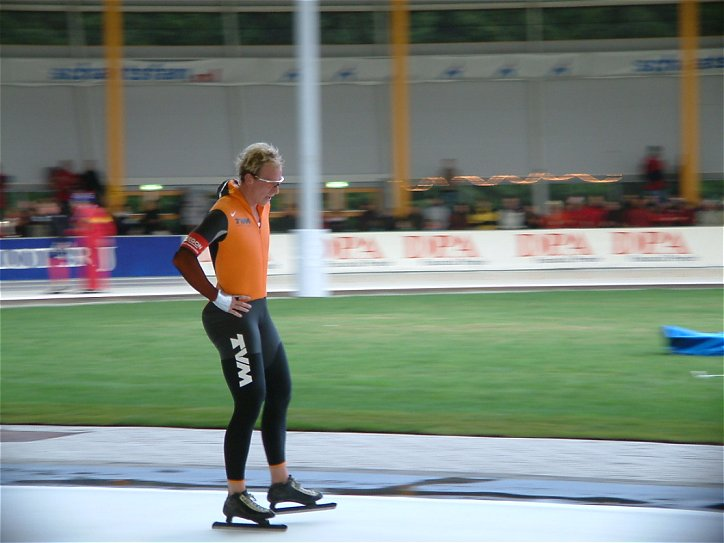
Ritsma at the 2003 Dutch Championships in Eindhoven

=== Personal records ===
Personal records
Men's speed skating
Event	Result	Date	Location	Notes
500 meter	35.90	20 February 1999	Hamar	
1000 meter	1:10.19	20 February 1999	Hamar	
1500 meter	1:45.86	19 February 2002	Hamar	
3000 meter	3:49.29	11 March 2004	Heerenveen	
5000 meter	6:20.26	19 November 2005	Salt Lake City	
10000 meter	13:28.19	17 February 1998	Hamar	

Source: SpeedskatingResults.com

== Tournament overview ==
Season	Dutch Championships Single Distances	Dutch Championships Allround	Dutch Championships Sprint	European Championships Allround	Olympic Games	World Championships Single Distances	World Championships Allround	World Championships Sprint	World Cup GWC	World Championships Junior Allround
1987–88										SEOUL 15th 500m 7th 3000m 9th 1500m 4th 5000m 5th overall
1988–89	HEERENVEEN 23rd 500m 16th 1500m 12th 5000m									KYIV 29th 500m (silver) 3000m 8th 1500m (silver) 5000m (silver) overall
1989–90	HEERENVEEN 11th 500m 8th 1500m 9th 5000m 15th 10000m	ASSEN 8th 500m 5th 5000m 6th 1500m 5th 10000m 5th overall								
1990–91	THE HAGUE 4th 1500m 4th 5000m 6th 10000m	ALKMAAR 12th 500m 5th 5000m 12th 1500m 6th 10000m 7th overall							13th 1500m	
1991–92	HEERENVEEN 5th 1000m (gold) 1500m 6th 5000m 7th 10000m	ALKMAAR (gold) 500m (bronze) 5000m (bronze) 1500m 4th 10000m (bronze) overall		HEERENVEEN 4th 500m 6th 5000m (bronze) 1500m 6th 10000m (bronze) overall	ALBERTVILLE 27th 500m 12th 1000m 4th 1500m		CALGARY 5th 500m 8th 5000m 8th 1500m 6th 10000m 5th overall		4th 1500m 11th 5000/10000m	
1992–93	DEVENTER (silver) 500m (gold) 1500m (gold) 5000m (bronze) 10000m	ASSEN (gold) 500m 5th 5000m (silver) 1500m 5th 10000m (bronze) overall		HEERENVEEN (bronze) 500m 4th 5000m (silver) 1500m (bronze) 10000m (bronze) overall			HAMAR (bronze) 500m 4th 5000m (bronze) 1500m 4th 10000m (bronze) overall		(gold) 1500m (bronze) 5000/10000m	
1993–94	HEERENVEEN (gold) 1500m (gold) 5000m (silver) 10000m	THE HAGUE (bronze) 500m 4th 5000m (gold) 1500m (bronze) 10000m (silver) overall		HAMAR (gold) 500m (gold) 5000m (gold) 1500m 4th 10000m (gold) overall	LILLEHAMMER (silver) 1500m (bronze) 5000m 7th 10000m		GOTHENBURG 8th 500m 6th 5000m 4th 1500m 4th 10000m (bronze) overall		27th 1000m (bronze) 1500m (silver) 5000/10000m	
1994–95	THE HAGUE (silver) 1500m (gold) 5000m (gold) 10000m	ASSEN (silver) 500m 6th 5000m (silver) 1500m (gold) 10000m (silver) overall		HEERENVEEN (bronze) 500m (gold) 5000m (gold) 1500m (gold) 10000m (gold) overall			BASELGA di PINÈ (bronze) 500m 5th 5000m (gold) 1500m (gold) 10000m (gold) overall		(silver) 1500m (gold) 5000/10000m	
1995–96	GRONINGEN (gold) 1500m	THE HAGUE (bronze) 500m (gold) 5000m (silver) 1500m (silver) 10000m (gold) overall		HEERENVEEN 7th 500m (silver) 5000m (silver) 1500m (silver) 10000m (gold) overall		HAMAR 8th 5000m 10th 10000m	INZELL (bronze) 500m (silver) 5000m (bronze) 1500m (gold) 10000m (gold) overall		8th 1500m (gold) 5000/10000m	
1996–97		ASSEN (silver) 500m (silver) 5000m (gold) 1500m (silver) 10000m (gold) overall		HEERENVEEN (bronze) 500m (silver) 5000m (gold) 1500m (gold) 10000m (silver) overall		WARSAW (gold) 1500m (gold) 5000m (silver) 10000m	NAGANO 9th 500m 7th 5000m 5th 1500m 7th 10000m 5th overall		(gold) 1500m (gold) 5000/10000m	
1997–98	HEERENVEEN (gold) 1500m (gold) 5000m			HELSINKI (silver) 500m (gold) 5000m (gold) 1500m (silver) 10000m (gold) overall	NAGANO (bronze) 1500m (silver) 5000m (bronze) 10000m	CALGARY 4th 1500m (silver) 5000m	HEERENVEEN 4th 500m (bronze) 5000m (silver) 1500m (silver) 10000m (silver) overall		(bronze) 1500m 4th 5000/10000m	
1998–99	GRONINGEN (gold) 1500m (silver) 5000m 4th 10000m		GRONINGEN 4th 500m (silver) 1000m 5th 500m (silver) 1000m 4th overall	HEERENVEEN (gold) 500m (bronze) 5000m (gold) 1500m 9th 10000m (gold) overall		HEERENVEEN (bronze) 1500m 18th 5000m	HAMAR 4th 500m 6th 5000m (silver) 1500m 4th 10000m (gold) overall	CALGARY 17th 500m 9th 1000m 27th 500m 14th 1000m 19th overall	(bronze) 1500m 5th 5000/10000m	
1999–2000		THE HAGUE (gold) 500m (silver) 5000m (silver) 1500m 5th 10000m (silver) overall		HAMAR (bronze) 500m 4th 5000m 4th 1500m 6th 10000m (gold) overall			MILWAUKEE 7th 500m 6th 5000m 5th 1500m 7th 10000m (bronze) overall		(bronze) 1500m 4th 5000/10000m	
2000–01	THE HAGUE 11th 1000m 5th 1500m (silver) 5000m	HEERENVEEN 24th 500m 13th 5000m 9th 1500m DNQ 10000m NC22 overall				SALT LAKE CITY 13th 1500m	BUDAPEST 5th 500m 7th 5000m (silver) 1500m (silver) 10000m (gold) overall		(bronze) 1500m 9th 5000/10000m	
2001–02	GRONINGEN 9th 1000m (bronze) 1500m (bronze) 5000m	ALKMAAR (bronze) 500m 15th 5000m DNS 1500m DNS 10000m NC overall	GRONINGEN 13th 500m 11th 1000m 13th 500m 12th 1000m 12th overall		SALT LAKE CITY 9th 1500m				12th 1500m 16th 5000/10000m	
2002–03	UTRECHT 11th 1500m 6th 5000m	ASSEN 8th 500m 6th 5000m 4th 1500m (bronze) 10000m (bronze) overall		HEERENVEEN 8th 500m (silver) 5000m 4th 1500m (bronze) 10000m (silver) overall			GOTHENBURG 11th 500m (silver) 5000m 5th 1500m (silver) 10000m (silver) overall			
2003–04	HEERENVEEN 13th 5000m	EINDHOVEN 10th 500m 12th 5000m 10th 1500m 10th 10000m 9th overall								
2004–05	ASSEN 25th 1500m 10th 5000m	HEERENVEEN 6th 500m 12th 5000m 13th 1500m 8th 10000m 7th overall								
2005–06	HEERENVEEN 22nd 1500m 4th 5000m	UTRECHT 5th 500m (silver) 5000m 11th 1500m (silver) 10000m (silver) overall			TURIN (bronze) team pursuit				15th 5000/10000m	
2006–07	ASSEN 20th 5000m	HEERENVEEN 16th 500m 5th 5000m 21st 1500m 5th 10000m 6th overall							(gold) team pursuit	
2007–08		GRONINGEN 19th 500m 15th 5000m 22nd 1500m DNQ 10000m NC overall(20)								

== World Cup overview ==
On 1 December 2013 in Astana, Kazakhstan, Sven Kramer won his 30th ISU World Cup event thus surpassing Ritsma as the most successful Dutch World Cup speed skater.

Season	1500 meter						
1990–1991	17th	20th	22nd	9th	–	3rd place, bronze medalist(s)	
1991–1992	4th	1st place, gold medalist(s)	2nd place, silver medalist(s)	10th	10th		
1992–1993	2nd place, silver medalist(s)	1st place, gold medalist(s)	1st place, gold medalist(s)	2nd place, silver medalist(s)	3rd place, bronze medalist(s)	4th	
1993–1994	4th	3rd place, bronze medalist(s)	5th	3rd place, bronze medalist(s)	2nd place, silver medalist(s)		
1994–1995	5th	2nd place, silver medalist(s)	1st place, gold medalist(s)	5th	1st place, gold medalist(s)	1st place, gold medalist(s)	6th
1995–1996	5th	4th	5th	4th	8th	12th	
1996–1997	3rd place, bronze medalist(s)	2nd place, silver medalist(s)	–	–	5th	1st place, gold medalist(s)	
1997–1998	4th	1st place, gold medalist(s)	4th	2nd place, silver medalist(s)	1st place, gold medalist(s)	–	
1998–1999	7th	2nd place, silver medalist(s)	6th	–	1st place, gold medalist(s)		
1999–2000	6th	2nd place, silver medalist(s)	17th	6th	2nd place, silver medalist(s)		
2000–2001	1st place, gold medalist(s)	2nd place, silver medalist(s)	3rd place, bronze medalist(s)	16th	16th		
2001–2002	5th	11th	–	–	6th	10th	
2005–2006							

Season	5000/10000 meter							
1990–1991								
1991–1992	–	20th*	7th	14th	1st place, gold medalist(s)			
1992–1993	3rd place, bronze medalist(s)	4th	2nd place, silver medalist(s)	2nd place, silver medalist(s)	3rd place, bronze medalist(s)	9th	8th*	
1993–1994	1st place, gold medalist(s)	2nd place, silver medalist(s)	(silver) *	1st place, gold medalist(s)	4th	4th	5th*	
1994–1995	1st place, gold medalist(s)	1st place, gold medalist(s)	1st place, gold medalist(s)	1st place, gold medalist(s)	1st place, gold medalist(s)	1st place, gold medalist(s)	2nd place, silver medalist(s)	7th*
1995–1996	1st place, gold medalist(s)	4th	2nd place, silver medalist(s)	3rd place, bronze medalist(s)	1st place, gold medalist(s)	1st place, gold medalist(s)	(gold) *	
1996–1997	2nd place, silver medalist(s)	1st place, gold medalist(s)	1st place, gold medalist(s)	–*	6th	1st place, gold medalist(s)		
1997–1998	5th	4th	6th	(bronze) *	1st place, gold medalist(s)	–		
1998–1999	3rd place, bronze medalist(s)	16th*	3rd place, bronze medalist(s)	–	1st place, gold medalist(s)			
1999–2000	4th	6th*	13th	3rd place, bronze medalist(s)	4th			
2000–2001	2nd place, silver medalist(s)	–*	4th	–	16th			
2001–2002	3rd place, bronze medalist(s)	12th	20th	–	–			
2005–2006	12th	13th	–*	15th	8th			

Season	Season	Team pursuit	
1990–1991			
1991–1992			
1992–1993			
1993–1994			
1994–1995			
1995–1996			
1996–1997			
1997–1998			
1998–1999			
1999–2000			
2000–2001			
2001–2002			
2005–2006	2nd place, silver medalist(s)	–	–

– = Did not participate
* = 10000 meter

== Medals won ==
Championship	Gold (gold)	Silver (silver)	Bronze (bronze)
Dutch Single Distances	11	5	3
Dutch Allround Events	7	12	7
Dutch Allround Classification	2	4	3
European Allround Events	12	8	8
European Allround Classification	6	2	2
Olympic Games	0	2	4
World Cup Events	29	20	14
World Cup Classification	6	0	4
World Single Distances	2	2	1
World Allround Events	3	8	6
World Allround Classification	4	2	3
World Junior Allround Events	0	2	0
World Junior Allround Classification	0	1	0
Total	82	68	55

Awards
Preceded by (Norway) Ådne Søndrål	Oscar Mathisen Award; 1999	Succeeded by (Netherlands) Gianni Romme
Preceded by (Netherlands) Falko Zandstra	Ard Schenk Award; 1994	Succeeded by (Netherlands) Annamarie Thomas
Preceded by (Netherlands) Annamarie Thomas	Ard Schenk Award; 1996	Succeeded by (Netherlands) Ids Postma
Preceded by (Netherlands) Marianne Timmer	Ard Schenk Award; 1999	Succeeded by (Netherlands) Gianni Romme
