= Park Jae-man =

South Korean speed skater

Personal information
- Nationality: South Korean
- Born: 27 February 1980 (age 45)

Sport
- Sport: Speed skating

Park Jae-man (born 27 February 1980) is a South Korean speed skater. He competed in two events at the 2002 Winter Olympics.
