= Maki Tabata =

Japanese speed skater and cyclist

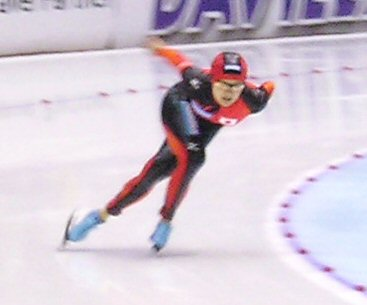

Personal information
- Born: 9 November 1974 (age 51) Mukawa, Hokkaido, Japan

Cycling career
- Sport: Cycling
- Disciplines: Speed skating Track cycling
Medal record
Representing Japan
Women's speed skating
Olympic Games
Silver medal – second place	2010 Vancouver	Team pursuit
World Championships
Silver medal – second place	2001 Salt Lake City	1500 m
Silver medal – second place	2003 Berlin	1500 m
Bronze medal – third place	2000 Milwaukee	Allround
Bronze medal – third place	2000 Nagano	3000 m
Bronze medal – third place	2001 Salt Lake City	5000 m
Bronze medal – third place	2005 Inzell	Team pursuit
Bronze medal – third place	2009 Vancouver	Team pursuit
Asian Games
Gold medal – first place	2003 Aomori	1500 m
Gold medal – first place	2003 Aomori	3000 m
Bronze medal – third place	2007 Changchun	3000 m
Asian Championships
Gold medal – first place	1999 Nagano	Allround
Gold medal – first place	2000 Ulan Bator	Allround
Gold medal – first place	2001 Harbin	Allround
Gold medal – first place	2003 Harbin	Allround
Gold medal – first place	2004 Chuncheon	Allround
Gold medal – first place	2008 Shenyang	Allround
Silver medal – second place	2005 Ikaho	Allround
Silver medal – second place	2007 Changchun	Allround
Silver medal – second place	2009 Tomakomai	Allround
Bronze medal – third place	2010 Obihiro	Allround
Women's track cycling
Asian Championships
Gold medal – first place	2012 Kuala Lumpur	Individual pursuit
Silver medal – second place	2012 Kuala Lumpur	Team pursuit
Bronze medal – third place	2012 Kuala Lumpur	Points race
Bronze medal – third place	2012 Kuala Lumpur	Scratch

Maki Tabata (田畑 真紀, Tabata Maki; born 9 November 1974 in Mukawa, Hokkaido, Japan) is a Japanese speed skater and track cyclist.

Maki Tabata won bronze at the World Allround Championships in 2000 and one month later, she won another bronze, this time on the 3000 m at the World Single Distance Championships. The next year (2001), she won silver on the 1500 m and bronze on the 5000 m at the World Single Distance Championships. In 2003, she won another World Single Distance silver on the 1500 m.

In addition, Tabata has won numerous titles and medals at the Asian Championships that are used to qualify for the World Allround Championships, at the Asian Single Distance Championships, and at Japanese Championships (both in Allround and Single Distance). She also has a few World Cup victories, both in individual events and in the team pursuit.

As a track cyclist she competed in four events at the 2012 UCI Track Cycling World Championships and won medals in four disciplines at the 2012 Asian Cycling Championships, including a gold medal in the individual pursuit.

== World records ==
Over the course of her career, Tabata skated one world record:

Distance	Result	Date	Location
Mini combination	162.731	16 August 1998	Calgary

== Personal records ==
To put these personal records in perspective, the last column (WR) lists the official world records on the dates that Tabata skated her personal records.

Distance	Result	Date	Location	WR
500 m	39.18	15 March 2001	Olympic Oval, Calgary	37.29
1000 m	1:16.00	8 December 2001	Olympic Oval, Calgary	1:14.06
1500 m	1:54.55	12 December 2009	Utah Olympic Oval, Salt Lake City	1:53.22
3000 m	4:01.01	27 January 2002	Olympic Oval, Calgary	3:59.26
5000 m	7:00.09	19 March 2006	Olympic Oval, Calgary	6:55.34
