= Mark Knoll =

Canadian speed skater

Personal information
- Born: July 26, 1976 (age 49) Regina, Saskatchewan
- Height: 184 cm (6 ft 0 in)
- Weight: 76 kg (168 lb; 12 st 0 lb)
- Spouse: Tonny de Jong

Sport
- Country: Canada
- Sport: Long Track Speed Skating

Achievements and titles
- Olympic finals: 1998, 2002

Mark Knoll (born July 26, 1976) is a Canadian former speed skater and schoolteacher. He twice took part in the Winter Olympic Games.

He went to the 1998 Winter Olympics, competing in the men's 5000 metres in speed skating and finishing 24th. He competed again in the 2002 Winter Olympics in the same category and finished 18th.

He is married to Dutch skater Tonny de Jong. They have had three children: Ryder Knoll, Nico Knoll, and Jasper Knoll.

He formerly taught as a grade 7 teacher of In My Backyard, Peaks, & Outsiders with his old homeroom class at Westmount Charter School and resides in Calgary.

He is currently teaching at a different school, which is currently unknown.

== Personal records ==
Distance	Time	Date	Location
500 meter	37.00	January 17, 2003	Calgary
1000 meters	1.11.51	January 6, 2001	Calgary
1500 meters	1.48.46	January 25, 2003	Salt Lake City
3,000 meters	3.48.65	October 27, 2000	Calgary
5000 meters	6.30.63	February 9, 2002	Salt Lake City
10000 meters	13.47.96	21 December 2001	Calgary
