= Andrey Anufriyenko =

Russian speed skater (1970–2019)

Personal information
- Native name: Андрей Викторович Ануфриенко
- Full name: Andrey Viktorovich Anufriyenko
- Nationality: Russian
- Born: 26 December 1970; Yekaterinburg, Russia
- Died: 6 March 2019 (aged 48)
- Height: 178 cm (5 ft 10 in)
- Weight: 70 kg (154 lb)

Sport
- Country: Russia
- Sport: Speed skating

Andrey Viktorovich Anufriyenko (Russian: Андрей Викторович Анүфриенко; 26 November 1970 – 6 March 2019) was a Russian speed skater. He competed at the 1994 Winter Olympics and the 1998 Winter Olympics. He died on 6 March 2019.
