= Vadim Sayutin =

Soviet speed skater

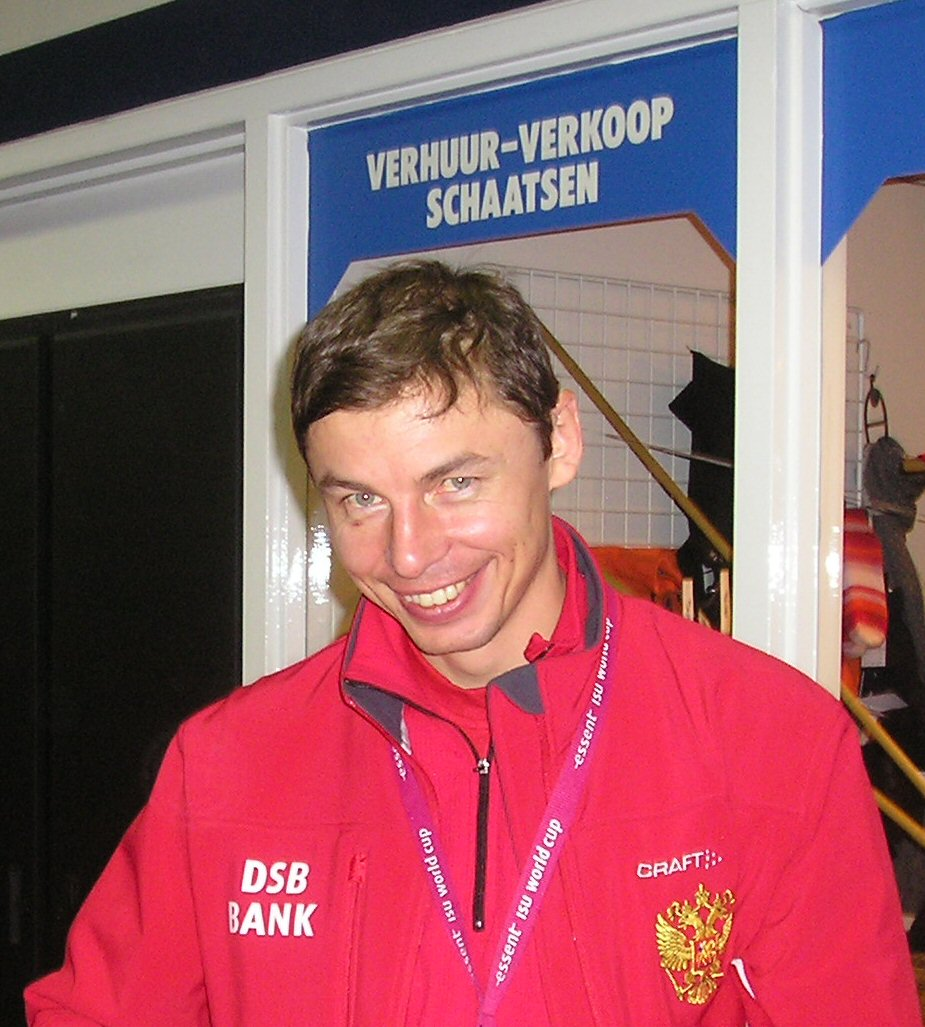
Vadim Sayutin in November 2006

Vadim Aleksandrovich Sayutin (Russian: Вадим Александрович Саютин) (born 31 December 1970) is a former speed skater who represented the Soviet Union, the Commonwealth of Independent States, Kazakhstan, and Russia, in that order. Sayutin was born in Alma-Ata (now Almaty), Kazakhstan, the city where the famous Medeo skating rink is located.

Sayutin performed best on the 5,000 m and the 10,000 m, which often kept him from winning medals during allround championships. However, he also managed to perform well on the 1,500 m a few times, resulting in a bronze medal at the 1998 European Allround Championships and a silver medal at the 1999 World Allround Championships. He participated in four Winter Olympic Games, but never won any medals there.

Sayutin started his speed skating career not long before the dissolution of the Soviet Union and so originally represented the Soviet Union. At the 1992 Winter Olympics of Albertville, he represented the Commonwealth of Independent States. After that, he represented Kazakhstan for two seasons. When he married Russian speed skater Svetlana Bazhanova in 1994, he started skating for Russia. During that time, he lived in the Netherlands for several years, training at the Thialf arena in Heerenveen.

After the 2002/2003 season, Sayutin ended his speed skating career.

== Medals ==
An overview of medals won by Sayutin at important championships he participated in, listing the years in which he won each. He participated at least once in all the championships that are listed.

Championships	Gold medal	Silver medal	Bronze medal
Winter Olympics	–	–	–
World Allround	–	1999	–
World Single Distance	–	–	2001 (10,000 m)
World Cup	–	–	–
European Allround	–	–	1998
Soviet Allround	–	–	–
Russian Allround	1995	1997	2000

== Personal records ==
To put these personal records in perspective, the WR column lists the official world records on the dates that Sayutin skated his personal records.

Event	Result	Date	Venue	WR
500 m	37.67	20 October 2001	Salt Lake City	34.32
1,000 m	1:15.09	11 November 2000	Berlin	1:08.35
1,500 m	1:46.99	9 March 2001	Salt Lake City	1:45.56
3,000 m	3:48.31	26 January 2002	Salt Lake City	3:42.75
5,000 m	6:23.47	2 March 2001	Calgary	6:18.72
10,000 m	13:17.83	11 March 2001	Salt Lake City	13:03.40
Big combination	153.360	7 February 1999	Hamar	153.376

Note that Sayutin's personal record on the big combination was not a world record because Rintje Ritsma skated 152.651 at the same meet.

Sayutin has an Adelskalender score of 151.571 points. His highest ranking on the Adelskalender was a fourth place.
