= Baek Eun-bi =

South Korean speed skater (born 1979)

Baek Eun-bi (백은비)
Personal information
- Born: 14 September 1979 (age 46) Chuncheon, South Korea
- Height: 1.57 m (5 ft 2 in)
- Weight: 54 kg (119 lb)

Sport
- Country: South Korea
- Sport: Speed skating
- Retired: 2007

Achievements and titles
- Personal bests: 500 m – 40.02; 1000 m – 1:19.63; 1500 m – 1:59.54; 3000 m – 4:09.91; 5000 m – 7:13.60
Medal record
Women's speed skating
Representing South Korea
World Junior Championships
Silver medal – second place	1997 Butte	All Around
Bronze medal – third place	1996 Calgary	1500 m
Bronze medal – third place	1999 Geithus	1500 m
Asian Winter Games
Silver medal – second place	2003 Aomori	3000 m
Bronze medal – third place	2003 Aomori	1500 m

Baek Eun-bi (Korean: 백은비, born 14 September 1979) is a retired South Korean female speed skater. She competed at the 1994, 1998 and 2002 edition of Winter Olympics. She qualified for the Olympic 3000 m, in which she placed 23rd. She again qualified for the Olympics in 1998, and again placed 23rd in the 3000 m and 25th in the 1500 m. Her last Olympic again ended up in the lower half of the field (33rd in the 1500m, 25th in the 3000m).

== Personal records ==
Personal records
Women's speed skating
Event	Result	Date	Location	Notes
500 m	40.02	28 November 1998	Olympic Oval, Calgary	
1000 m	1:19.63	29 November 1998	Olympic Oval, Calgary	
1500 m	1:59.54	27 November 1999	Olympic Oval, Calgary	
3000 m	4.09.91	26 November 1999	Olympic Oval, Calgary	
5000 m	7:13.60	28 November 1999	Olympic Oval, Calgary	
