= Kevin Marshall (speed skater) =

Canadian speed skater

Personal information
- Nationality: Canadian
- Born: 12 January 1973 (age 52); Victoria, British Columbia, Canada

Sport
- Sport: Speed skating

Kevin Marshall (born 12 January 1973) is a Canadian speed skater. He competed at the 1998 Winter Olympics and the 2002 Winter Olympics.
