= Nami Nemoto =

Japanese speed skater (born 1975)

Personal information
- Nationality: Japanese
- Born: 24 March 1975 (age 50); Kamishihoro, Hokkaido, Japan

Sport
- Sport: Speed skating

Nami Nemoto (根本 奈美, Nemoto Nami, born 24 March 1975) is a Japanese speed skater. She competed at the 1998, 2002 and the 2006 Winter Olympics.
