= Song Li (speed skater) =

Chinese speed skater

Personal information
- Nationality: Chinese
- Born: 10 March 1981 (age 45) Qiqihar, China

Sport
- Sport: Speed skating

Song Li (Chinese: 宋丽, born 10 March 1981) is a Chinese speed skater. She competed at the 1998 Winter Olympics and the 2002 Winter Olympics.
