= Gao Yang (speed skater) =

Chinese speed skater

Personal information
- Nationality: Chinese
- Born: 1 November 1980 (age 44); Jilin, China

Sport
- Sport: Speed skating

Gao Yang (born 1 November 1980) is a Chinese speed skater. She competed in two events at the 2002 Winter Olympics.
