= Chiharu Nozaki =

Japanese speed skater (born 1973)

Personal information
- Nationality: Japanese
- Born: 12 May 1973 (age 51); Honbetsu, Hokkaido, Japan

Sport
- Sport: Speed skating

Chiharu Nozaki (野崎 千春, Nozaki Chiharu, born 12 May 1973) is a Japanese speed skater. She competed in two events at the 1998 Winter Olympics.
