= Eriko Seo =

Japanese speed skater (born 1979)

Personal information
- Nationality: Japanese
- Born: 12 March 1979 (age 47) Obihiro, Hokkaido, Japan

Sport
- Sport: Speed skating

Eriko Seo (妹尾 栄里子, Seo Eriko; born 12 March 1979) is a Japanese speed skater. She competed at the 2002 Winter Olympics and the 2006 Winter Olympics.
