= Keiji Shirahata =

Japanese speed skater (born 1973)

Personal information
- Born: 8 October 1973 (age 52) Kushiro, Hokkaido, Japan

Sport
- Country: Japan
- Sport: Speed skating
- Turned pro: 1991
- Retired: 2002
Medal record
Men's speed skating
Representing Japan
World Championships
Silver medal – second place	1995 Baselga di Pinè	Allround
Silver medal – second place	1997 Nagano	Allround
Bronze medal – third place	1996 Inzell	Allround
World Single Distance Championships
Silver medal – second place	1996 Hamar	5000 m
Bronze medal – third place	2000 Nagano	5000 m
Asian Championships
Gold medal – first place	2001 Harbin	Allround
Bronze medal – third place	2000 Ulan Bator	Allround

Keiji Shirahata (白幡 圭史, Shirahata Keiji; born 8 October 1973) is a retired Japanese speed skater.

With two silver and one bronze medals at the World All-Round Speed Skating Championships he has been the most successful Japanese long track speed skater in all-round competitions. He was ranked 4th on the Adelskalender in February 1997. Shirahata established 22 national records and was nine times national all-round champion.

== Records ==
=== Personal records ===
Personal records
Men's speed skating
Event	Result	Date	Location	Notes
500 m	37.18	10 August 2001	Calgary	
1000 m	1:22.86	18 February 1989	Sapporo	
1500 m	1:47.78	9 February 2002	Salt Lake City	
3000 m	3:47.00	1 December 2001	Calgary	
5000 m	6:26.04	9 March 2001	Salt Lake City	
10000 m	13:19.92	9 March 2001	Salt Lake City	
