= Sergey Tsybenko =

Kazakhstani speed skater (born 1973)

Personal information
- Nationality: Kazakhstani
- Born: 9 December 1973 (age 52) Semipalatinsk, Kazakh SSR, Soviet Union

Sport
- Sport: Speed skating

Sergey Tsybenko (Сергей Александрович Цыбенко, born 9 December 1973) is a Kazakhstani speed skater. He competed at the 1994 Winter Olympics, the 1998 Winter Olympics and the 2002 Winter Olympics.
