= Takahiro Nozaki =

Japanese speed skater (born 1974)

Personal information
- Nationality: Japanese
- Born: 19 November 1974 (age 50); Hokkaido, Japan

Sport
- Sport: Speed skating

Takahiro Nozaki (born 19 November 1974) is a Japanese speed skater. He competed in the men's 5000 metres event at the 1998 Winter Olympics.
