= Hiroyuki Noake =

Japanese speed skater (born 1974)

Personal information
- Nationality: Japanese
- Born: 24 August 1974 (age 50); Suwa, Japan

Sport
- Sport: Speed skating

Hiroyuki Noake (born 24 August 1974) is a Japanese speed skater. He competed at the 1998 Winter Olympics and the 2002 Winter Olympics.

He participated in the 1,000 metres and the 1,500 metres team events in the 2002 Games and in the 1,000 metres, the 1,500 metres and 5,000 metres in the 1998 Games.
