= 1998 World Allround Speed Skating Championships =

International speed skating competition

World Allround Speed Skating Championships
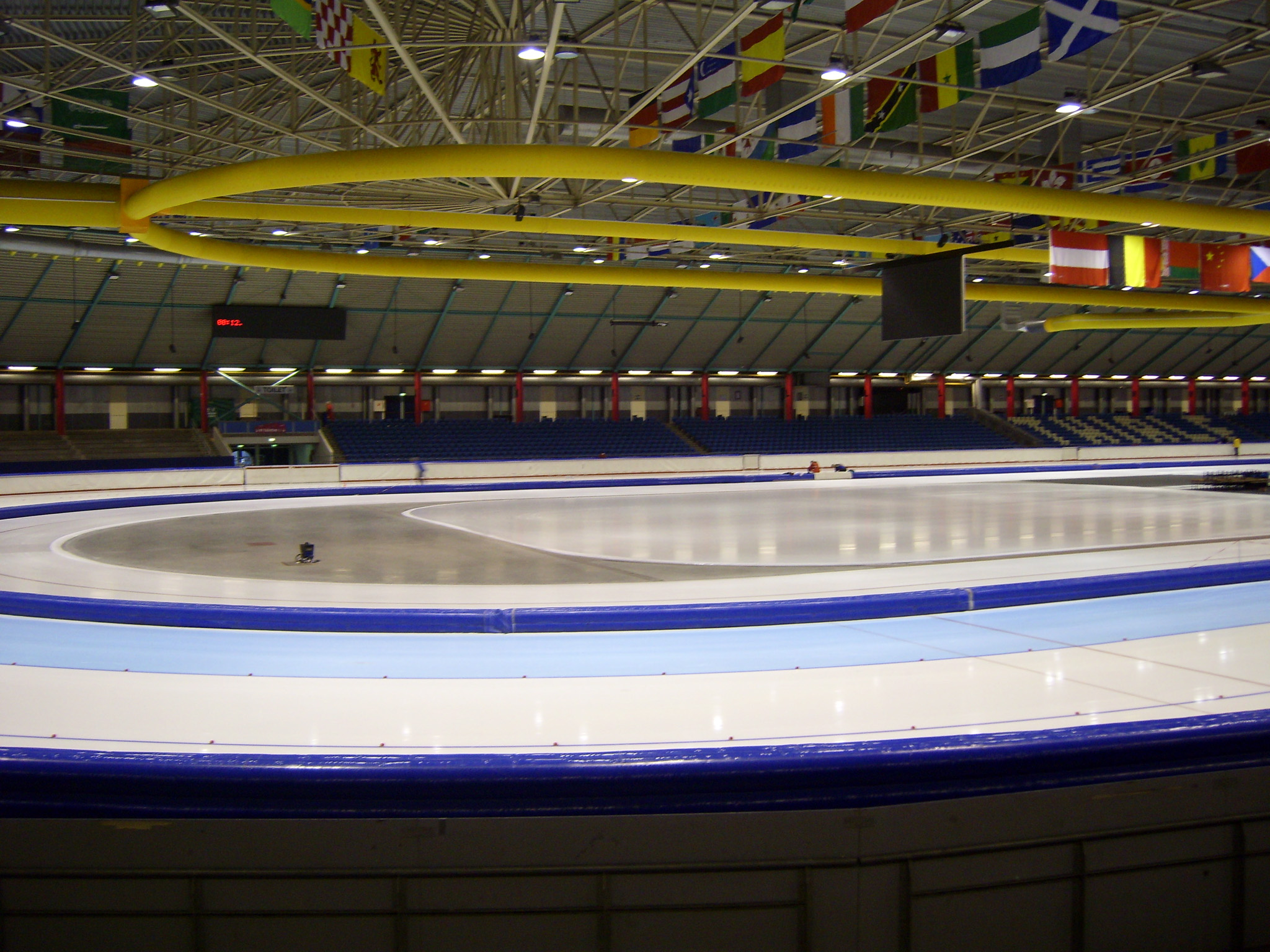
- Venue: Thialf, Heerenveen
- Dates: 13–15 March
- Competitors: 37 (M), 28 (W) from 22 nations

Medalist men
1st place, gold medalist(s)		Ids Postma	NED
2nd place, silver medalist(s)		Rintje Ritsma	NED
3rd place, bronze medalist(s)		Roberto Sighel	ITA

Medalist women
1st place, gold medalist(s)		Gunda Niemann-Stirnemann	GER
2nd place, silver medalist(s)		Claudia Pechstein	GER
3rd place, bronze medalist(s)		Anni Friesinger	GER

The 1998 World Allround Speed Skating Championships were held on 13–15 March 1998 in the Thialf stadium in Heerenveen, Netherlands.

Gunda Niemann-Stirnemann and Ids Postma were the world title holders from the previous year and successfully defended their titles. It was Niemann-Stirnemann's seventh all-round world title.

== Allround results ==
=== Men ===
Place	Athlete	Country	Points	500 m	5000 m	1500 m	10000 m
1st place, gold medalist(s)	Ids Postma	Netherlands	**153.367 WR**	**36.48** (1)	**6:33.09** (1)	**1:48.85** (1)	13:45.91 (4)
2nd place, silver medalist(s)	Rintje Ritsma	Netherlands	154.091	37.17 (4)	6:34.68 (3)	1:48.86 (2)	13:43.35 (2)
3rd place, bronze medalist(s)	Roberto Sighel	Italy	155.830	37.54 (6)	6:39.68 (6)	1:51.19 (3)	13:45.18 (3)
4	Bart Veldkamp	Belgium	156.129	39.02 (27)	6:34.60 (2)	1:51.57 (5)	**13:29.19** (1)
5	K. C. Boutiette	United States	156.587	36.90 (2)	6:40.01 (7)	1:52.29 (10)	14:05.13 (9)
6	Jelmer Beulenkamp	Netherlands	157.165	37.95 (14)	6:39.15 (5)	1:51.46 (4)	14:02.94 (8)
7	Keiji Shirahata	Japan	157.478	37.78 (11)	6:48.16 (12)	1:52.37 (11)	13:48.53 (5)
8	Frank Dittrich	Germany	158.217	38.65 (24)	6:38.90 (4)	1:54.20 (21)	13:52.23 (6)
9	Uwe Tonat	Germany	158.363	37.76 (10)	6:47.86 (11)	1:52.65 (13)	14:05.35 (10)
10	Steven Elm	Canada	158.442	38.10 (16)	6:49.63 (17)	1:52.13 (7)	14:00.06 (7)
11	Dave Tamburrino	United States	159.384	37.74 (9)	6:49.36 (16)	1:53.69 (18)	14:16.25 (11)
12	Sergej Tsibenko	Kazakhstan	159.938	37.49 (5)	6:52.90 (20)	1:52.26 (8)	14:34.76 (12)
NC13	Eskil Ervik	Norway	116.613	38.54 (20)	6:41.50 (9)	1:53.77 (19)	
NC14	Mamoru Ishioka	Japan	116.737	37.89 (13)	6:48.77 (13)	1:53.91 (20)	
NC15	Michael Spielmann	Germany	116.808	37.56 (7)	6:58.25 (26)	1:52.27 (9)	
NC16	Takahiro Nozaki	Japan	116.899	38.33 (18)	6:48.86 (14)	1:53.05 (16)	
NC17	Kevin Marshall	Canada	117.154	37.64 (8)	6:58.91 (27)	1:52.87 (15)	
NC18	Maurizio De Monte	Italy	117.274	38.07 (15)	6:56.21 (24)	1:52.75 (14)	
NC19	Cédric Kuentz	France	117.358	37.85 (12)	6:59.78 (29)	1:52.59 (12)	
NC20	Marnix ten Kortenaar	Austria	117.390	38.57 (22)	6:51.10 (19)	1:53.13 (17)	
NC21	Paweł Zygmunt	Poland	117.411	38.49 (19)	6:45.61 (10)	1:55.08 (23)	
NC22	Jason Parker	Canada	117.457	37.14 (3)	7:09.74 (32)	1:52.03 (6)	
NC23	Jondon Trevena	United States	118.081	38.22 (17)	6:56.05 (23)	1:54.77 (22)	
NC24	Kjell Storelid	Norway	118.493	39.77 (31)	6:40.37 (8)	1:56.06 (28)	
NC25	Sebastian Falk	Sweden	118.600	38.55 (21)	6:56.90 (25)	1:55.08 (23)	
NC26	Anatoli Krasjeninin	Russia	118.886	39.31 (28)	6:49.10 (15)	1:56.00 (27)	
NC27	Dmitri Krasovski	Russia	119.097	38.58 (23)	6:59.51 (28)	1:55.70 (25)	
NC28	Desző Horváth	Romania	119.411	39.32 (29)	6:54.65 (22)	1:55.88 (26)	
NC29	Samuli Ollanketo	Finland	120.902	39.57 (30)	7:05.26 (30)	1:56.42 (29)	
NC30	Oleg Psevkin	Belarus	121.611	38.99 (26)	7:14.18 (34)	1:57.61 (31)	
NC31	Sergij Priz	Ukraine	121.895	39.77 (31)	7:11.29 (33)	1:56.99 (30)	
NC32	Fausto Marreiros	Portugal	123.549	40.31 (34)	7:08.99 (31)	2:01.02 (33)	
NC33	Martin Holoubek	Czech Republic	126.010	41.11 (36)	7:20.20 (35)	2:02.64 (34)	
NC34	Martin Feigenwinter	Switzerland	141.180	1:00.63 (37f)	6:49.74 (18)	1:58.73 (32)	
NF3	Stefan Lechner	Austria	81.774	40.32 (35)	6:54.54 (21)	(NF)	
NS3	Andrew Nicholson	New Zealand	83.021	38.92 (25)	7:21.01 (36)	(NS)	
NS2	Vadim Sayutin	Russia	39.800	39.80 (33)	(NS)		

=== Women ===
**Place**	**Athlete**	**Country**	**Points**	**500 m**	**1500 m**	**3000 m**	**5000 m**
1st place, gold medalist(s)	Gunda Niemann-Stirnemann	Germany	**163.020** **WR**	40.57 (9)	**1:58.69** (1)	**4:05.08** (1) **WR**	**7:00.41** (1)
2nd place, silver medalist(s)	Claudia Pechstein	Germany	163.669	40.12 (4)	1:59.26 (2)	4:07.36 (2)	7:05.70 (2)
3rd place, bronze medalist(s)	Anni Friesinger	Germany	166.014	40.40 (6)	2:01.02 (8)	4:11.57 (3)	7:13.46 (6)
4	Tonny de Jong	Netherlands	166.410	40.87 (11)	2:02.28 (12)	4:12.88 (4)	7:06.34 (3)
5	Jennifer Rodriguez	United States	167.106	40.51 (8)	2:00.63 (6)	4:15.33 (7)	7:18.31 (7)
6	Lyudmila Prokasheva	Kazakhstan	167.375	41.20 (15)	2:01.72 (9)	4:14.27 (5)	7:12.24 (4)
7	Annamarie Thomas	Netherlands	167.571	40.08 (3)	2:00.12 (5)	4:16.67 (8)	7:26.73 (9)
8	Emese Hunyady	Austria	167.922	40.25 (5)	1:59.93 (4)	4:17.09 (9)	7:28.48 (10)
9	Tatyana Trapeznikova	Russia	168.046	40.45 (7)	2:02.00 (10)	4:17.47 (10)	7:20.19 (8)
10	Barbara de Loor	Netherlands	168.185	41.67 (19)	2:02.13 (11)	4:15.26 (6)	7:12.62 (5)
11	Becky Sundstrom	United States	168.801	39.97 (2)	2:00.68 (7)	4:19.35 (14)	7:33.80 (11)
12	Chris Witty	United States	168.851	**39.45** (1)	1:59.46 (3)	4:22.57 (18)	7:38.20 (12)
NC13	Anette Tønsberg	Norway	125.072	40.94 (13)	2:03.17 (13)	4:18.46 (12)	
NC14	Cindy Overland	Canada	125.789	41.62 (18)	2:03.71 (14)	4:17.60 (11)	
NC15	Mie Uehara	Japan	126.033	41.35 (16)	2:03.99 (16)	4:20.12 (15)	
NC16	Noriko Munekata	Japan	126.252	41.84 (20)	2:03.80 (15)	4:18.88 (13)	
NC17	Chiharu Nozaki	Japan	126.530	40.88 (12)	2:04.44 (17)	4:25.02 (19)	
NC18	Varvara Barysheva	Russia	126.896	40.59 (10)	2:05.27 (21)	4:27.30 (20)	
NC19	Mihaela Dascălu	Romania	127.178	41.88 (21)	2:04.98 (19)	4:21.83 (17)	
NC20	Anna Saveljeva	Russia	127.336	41.13 (14)	2:04.50 (18)	4:28.24 (22)	
NC21	Isabelle Doucet	Canada	127.890	41.56 (17)	2:05.19 (20)	4:27.60 (21)	
NC22	Elena Belci-Dal Farra	Italy	128.551	42.92 (23)	2:06.75 (23)	4:20.29 (16)	
NC23	Lise Marie Braathen	Norway	129.968	43.05 (24)	2:06.63 (22)	4:28.25 (23)	
NC24	Svetlana Konstantinova	Ukraine	131.220	42.71 (22)	2:09.66 (25)	4:31.74 (25)	
NC25	Outi Aunula-Ylä-Sulkava	Finland	131.833	43.45 (25)	2:09.37 (24)	4:31.56 (24)	
NC26	Dana Ionescu	Romania	133.229	43.83 (27)	2:09.79 (26)	4:36.82 (26)	
NC27	Jana Rejhonová	Czech Republic	138.740	47.26 (28)	2:14.97 (27)	4:38.94 (27)	
DQ2	Irina Safrankova	Belarus	90.191	43.55 (26)	(DQ)	4:39.85 (28)	

bold signifies championship record.
