= 1997 World Allround Speed Skating Championships =

International speed skating competition

World Allround Speed Skating Championships
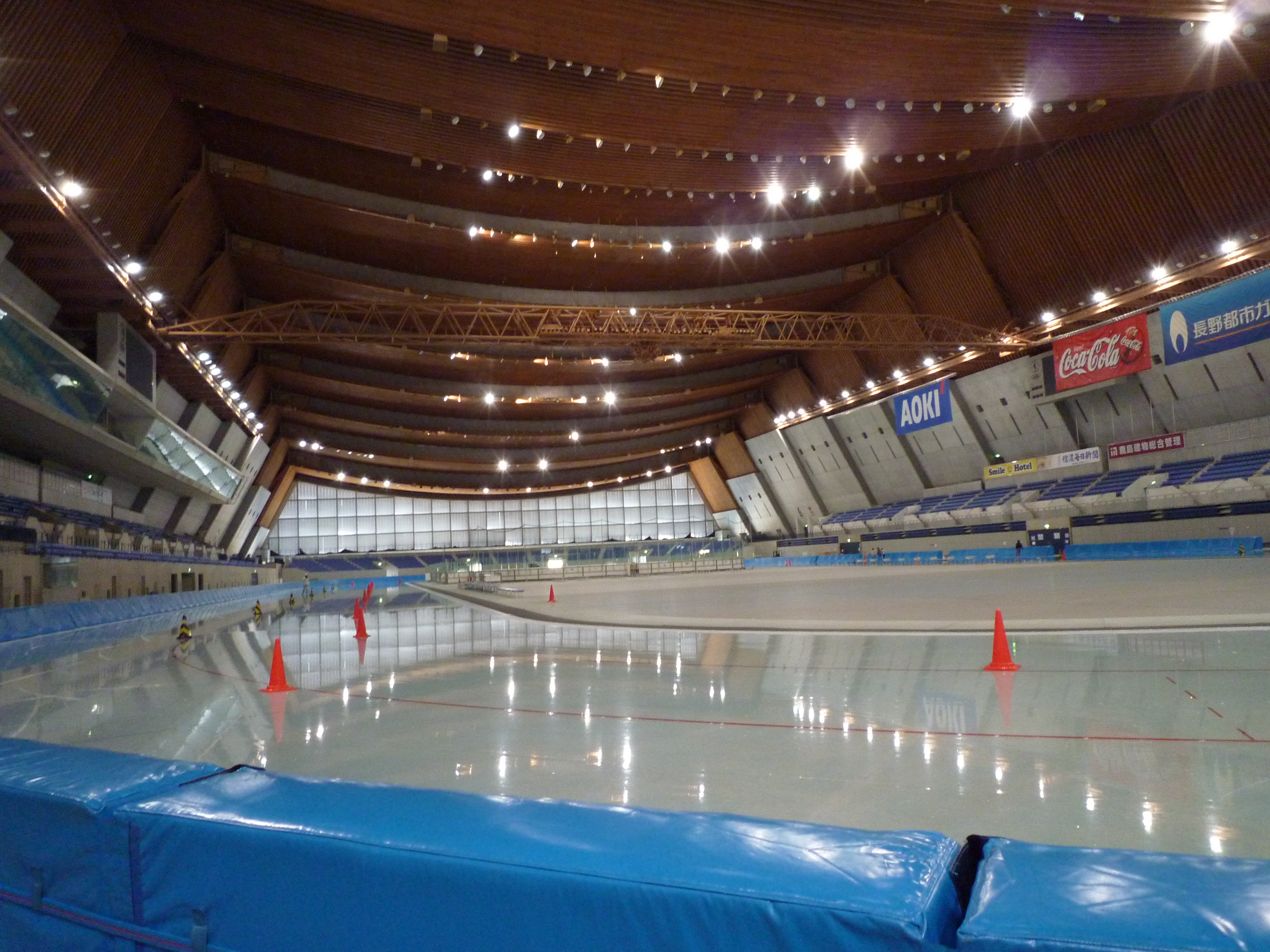
- Venue: M-Wave, Nagano
- Dates: 14–16 February
- Competitors: 36 (M), 30 (W) from 23 nations

Medalist men
1st place, gold medalist(s)		Ids Postma	NED
2nd place, silver medalist(s)		Keiji Shirahata	JPN
3rd place, bronze medalist(s)		Frank Dittrich	GER

Medalist women
1st place, gold medalist(s)		Gunda Niemann-Stirnemann	GER
2nd place, silver medalist(s)		Claudia Pechstein	GER
3rd place, bronze medalist(s)		Tonny de Jong	NED

The 1997 World Allround Speed Skating Championships were held on 14–16 February 1997 in the M-Wave stadium in Nagano, Japan.

Title defenders were the 1996 world champions Gunda Niemann-Stirnemann from Germany and Rintje Ritsma from the Netherlands.

Gunda Niemann-Stirnemann from Germany and Ids Postma from the Netherlands became world champions.

== Allround results ==
=== Men ===
Place	Athlete	Country	Points	500 m	5000 m	1500 m	10000 m
1st place, gold medalist(s)	Ids Postma	Netherlands	157.906	37.36 (2)	6:49.09 (8)	**1:51.78** (1)	14:07.54 (4)
2nd place, silver medalist(s)	Keiji Shirahata	Japan	158.466	37.59 (3)	6:47.46 (3)	1:53.20 (6)	14:07.95 (5)
3rd place, bronze medalist(s)	Frank Dittrich	Germany	158.697	38.87 (19)	6:43.74 (2)	1:54.10 (9)	13:48.40 (2)
4	K. C. Boutiette	United States	158.739	37.93 (7)	6:48.62 (5)	1:52.53 (2)	14:08.75 (6)
5	Rintje Ritsma	Netherlands	159.090	37.99 (9)	6:48.96 (7)	1:53.12 (5)	14:09.97 (7)
6	Bart Veldkamp	Belgium	159.209	39.61 (26)	6:43.26 (1)	1:54.57 (11)	**13:41.66** (1)
7	Hiroyuki Noake	Japan	160.461	37.70 (4)	6:51.32 (11)	1:53.11 (4)	14:38.53 (11)
8	Toru Aoyanagi	Japan	160.900	38.16 (12)	6:56.23 (13)	1:54.17 (10)	14:21.22 (8)
9	Neal Marshall	Canada	161.067	37.96 (8)	6:59.02 (17)	1:53.68 (7)	14:26.24 (9)
10	Dave Tamburrino	United States	161.454	38.37 (15)	6:53.35 (12)	1:55.01 (12)	14:28.27 (10)
11	Lasse Sætre	Norway	161.503	40.10 (30)	6:47.97 (4)	1:56.65 (22)	13:54.46 (3)
12	Jason Parker	Canada	163.034	38.17 (13)	7:05.64 (25)	1:52.96 (3)	14:52.95 (12)
NC13	Kevin Marshall	Canada	118.418	38.01 (10)	7:00.15 (19)	1:55.18 (14)	
NC14	Falko Zandstra	Netherlands	118.621	38.06 (11)	7:01.35 (22)	1:55.28 (15)	
NC15	Uwe Tonat	Germany	118.627	39.21 (14)	6:50.74 (10)	1:55.03 (13)	
NC16	Anatoli Krasheninin	Russia	119.208	38.94 (21)	6:56.62 (15)	1:55.82 (18)	
NC17	Marnix ten Kortenaar	Austria	119.593	39.06 (22)	6:58.87 (16)	1:55.94 (19)	
NC18	Ermanno Ioriatti	Italy	120.043	37.74 (5)	7:12.20 (29)	1:57.25 (23)	
NC19	Dmitry Shepel	Russia	120.063	38.64 (17)	7:09.33 (27)	1:55.47 (16)	
NC20	Tim Hoffmann	United States	120.140	38.25 (14)	7:13.20 (30)	1:55.71 (17)	
NC21	Lee Kyou-hyuk	South Korea	120.181	37.14 (1)	7:23.58 (34)	1:56.05 (20)	
NC22	Roberto Sighel	Italy	120.274	38.84 (18)	7:02.68 (23)	1:57.50 (25)	
NC23	Radik Bikchentayev	Kazakhstan	120.295	39.21 (24)	7:03.62 (24)	1:56.17 (21)	
NC24	Jonas Schön	Sweden	120.768	39.67 (27)	7:00.15 (19)	1:57.25 (23)	
NC25	Christian Breuer	Germany	121.214	39.18 (23)	7:07.38 (26)	1:57.89 (26)	
NC26	Jaromir Radke	Poland	121.241	40.31 (32)	6:56.25 (14)	1:57.92 (27)	
NC27	Cédric Kuentz	France	121.287	39.68 (28)	7:01.14 (21)	1:58.48 (28)	
NC28	Davide Carta	Italy	121.399	37.86 (6)	7:19.99 (33)	1:58.62 (29)	
NC29	Vitali Novichenko	Belarus	121.642	38.88 (20)	7:11.32 (28)	1:58.89 (30)	
NC30	Kjell Storelid	Norway	121.701	40.90 (34)	6:49.45 (9)	1:59.57 (32)	
NC31	Martin Feigenwinter	Switzerland	123.335	41.25 (35)	6:59.95 (18)	2:00.27 (34)	
NC32	Boris Uvarov	Ukraine	123.617	40.21 (31)	7:14.84 (31)	1:59.77 (33)	
NC33	Andrew Nicholson	New Zealand	124.450	39.81 (29)	7:19.57 (32)	2:02.05 (35)	
NC34	Cédric Michaud	France	127.012	40.87 (33)	7:28.32 (35)	2:03.93 (36)	
NC35	Paweł Zygmunt	Poland	127.853	38.50 (16)	8:15.50 (36f)	1:59.41 (31)	
NC36	Vadim Sayutin	Russia	78.823	(DQ)	6:48.63 (6)	1:53.88 (8)	

bold signifies championship record.

=== Women ===
**Place**	**Athlete**	**Country**	**Points**	**500 m**	**1500 m**	**3000 m**	**5000 m**
1st place, gold medalist(s)	Gunda Niemann-Kleemann	Germany	**165.708** **WR**	40.79 (2)	**2:00.51** (1)	**4:10.40** (1)	**7:10.15** (1)
2nd place, silver medalist(s)	Claudia Pechstein	Germany	168.179	41.31 (9)	2:02.52 (3)	4:13.95 (2)	7:17.04 (3)
3rd place, bronze medalist(s)	Tonny de Jong	Netherlands	168.206	41.09 (6)	2:03.08 (5)	4:15.91 (3)	7:14.39 (2)
4	Anni Friesinger	Germany	168.751	41.52 (13)	2:02.00 (2)	4:16.24 (4)	7:18.59 (4)
5	Annamarie Thomas	Netherlands	169.605	40.53 (1)	2:02.79 (4)	4:18.45 (6)	7:30.70 (9)
6	Svetlana Bazhanova	Russia	169.695	41.61 (14)	2:03.47 (6)	4:17.77 (5)	7:19.68 (6)
7	Lyudmila Prokasheva	Kazakhstan	170.125	41.93 (17)	2:03.48 (7)	4:18.68 (8)	7:19.22 (5)
8	Mie Uehara	Japan	170.733	41.28 (8)	2:03.57 (8)	4:21.47 (11)	7:26.85 (7)
9	Barbara de Loor	Netherlands	171.764	41.99 (18)	2:05.24 (12)	4:18.51 (7)	7:29.43 (8)
10	Chiharu Nozaki	Japan	172.490	41.08 (5)	2:04.58 (9)	4:25.96 (18)	7:35.58 (10)
11	Becky Sundstrom	United States	173.344	40.89 (3)	2:05.66 (13)	4:26.51 (19)	7:41.50 (11)
12	Varvara Barysheva	Russia	174.087	41.75 (15)	2:05.21 (11)	4:23.51 (13)	7:46.83 (12)
NC13	Emese Hunyady	Austria	127.623	41.24 (7)	2:06.33 (16)	4:25.64 (16)	
NC14	Anette Tønsberg	Norway	127.823	42.22 (19)	2:06.09 (14)	4:21.44 (10)	
NC15	Mihaela Dascălu	Romania	127.999	41.38 (10)	2:07.72 (18)	4:24.28 (15)	
NC16	Kirstin Holum	United States	128.009	43.05 (24)	2:05.11 (10)	4:19.54 (9)	
NC17	Tatyana Trapeznikova	Russia	128.104	42.22 (19)	2:06.14 (15)	4:23.03 (12)	
NC18	Moira D'Andrea	United States	128.169	41.07 (4)	2:06.50 (17)	4:29.60 (21)	
NC19	Noriko Munekata	Japan	129.471	42.45 (22)	2:09.10 (20)	4:23.93 (14)	
NC20	Cindy Overland	Canada	129.838	42.47 (23)	2:08.11 (19)	4:27.99 (20)	
NC21	You Yanchun	China	130.299	41.42 (11)	2:09.85 (21)	4:33.58 (22)	
NC22	Cerasela Hordobețiu	Romania	131.369	42.40 (21)	2:10.12 (23)	4:33.58 (22)	
NC23	Elena Belci-Dal Farra	Italy	131.728	43.98 (30)	2:10.35 (24)	4:25.79 (17)	
NC24	Krisztina Egyed	Hungary	132.270	41.89 (16)	2:10.11 (22)	4:42.06 (28)	
NC25	Christina Schön	Sweden	132.521	43.24 (26)	2:10.91 (25)	4:33.87 (24)	
NC26	Svetlana Konstantinova	Ukraine	132.863	43.43 (28)	2:11.20 (27)	4:34.20 (26)	
NC27	Chiara Simionato	Italy	132.884	43.24 (26)	2:11.92 (29)	4:34.03 (25)	
NC28	Ingrid Liepa	Canada	133.482	43.21 (25)	2:11.15 (26)	4:39.34 (27)	
NC29	Kang Mi-yeong	South Korea	133.640	41.45 (12)	2:11.91 (28)	4:49.32 (30)	
NC30	Ilonda Lūse	Latvia	136.215	43.78 (29)	2:14.16 (30)	4:46.29 (29)	

bold signifies championship record.
