= 2001 World Allround Speed Skating Championships =

International speed skating competition

World Allround Speed Skating Championships
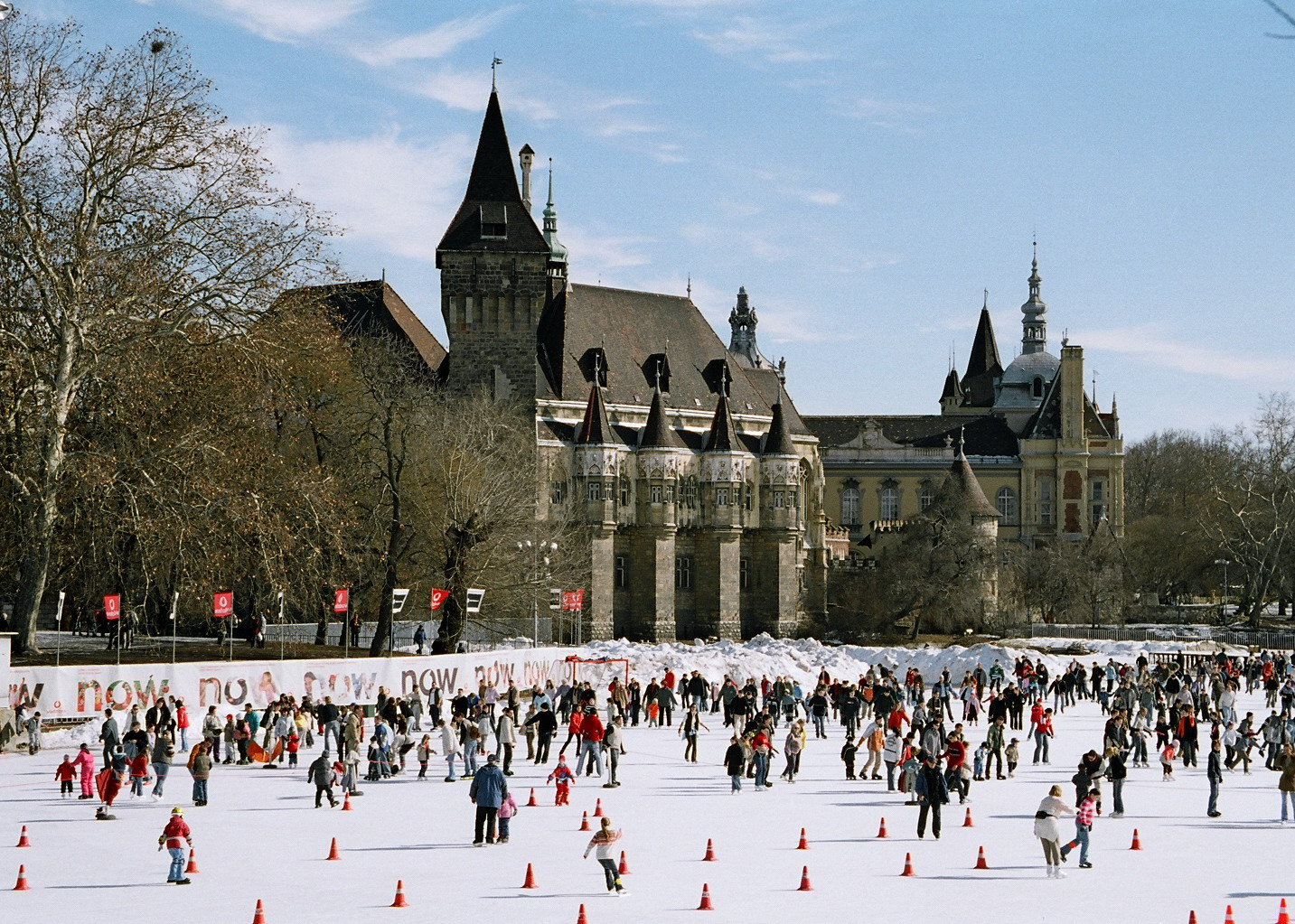
- City Park Ice Rink
- Location: Budapest, Hungary
- Venue: City Park Ice Rink
- Dates: 10–11 February
- Competitors: 48 from 10 nations

Medalist men
1st place, gold medalist(s)		Rintje Ritsma	NED
2nd place, silver medalist(s)		Ids Postma	NED
3rd place, bronze medalist(s)		Bart Veldkamp	BEL

Medalist women
1st place, gold medalist(s)		Anni Friesinger	GER
2nd place, silver medalist(s)		Claudia Pechstein	GER
3rd place, bronze medalist(s)		Renate Groenewold	NED

The 2001 World Allround Speed Skating Championships were held on the City Park Ice Rink in Budapest, Hungary, on 10–11 February 2001.

German Anni Friesinger and Dutchman Rintje Ritsma became the world champions.

== Men's championships ==
=== Allround results ===
Place	Athlete	Country	Points	500 m	5000 m	1500 m	10000 m
1st place, gold medalist(s)	Rintje Ritsma	Netherlands	158.731	37,76 (5)	6.51,08 (7)	1.54,18 (2)	13.56,07 (2)
2nd place, silver medalist(s)	Ids Postma	Netherlands	159.476	37,61 (3)	6.49,51 (2)	1.54,12 (1)	14.17,51 (8)
3rd place, bronze medalist(s)	Bart Veldkamp	Belgium	159.731	39,19 (20)	6.43,69 (1)	1.56,89 (12)	13.44,19 (1)
4	Keiji Shirahata	Japan	160.754	38,30 (9)	6.49,93 (4)	1.57,61 (16)	14.05,16 (4)
5	Dustin Molicki	Canada	160.878	38,56 (14)	6.50,42 (5)	1.55,96 (5)	14.12,46 (6)
6	Aleksandr Kibalko	Russia	161.040	37,64 (4)	6.57,80 (11)	1.54,98 (3)	14.25,89 (10)
7	Dmitri Shepel	Russia	161.368	38,66 (15)	6.53,10 (8)	1.55,80 (4)	14.15,97 (7)
8	Vadim Sayutin	Russia	161.512	39,40 (21)	6.50,86 (6)	1.56,27 (10)	14.05,40 (5)
9	Christian Breuer	Germany	161.623	37,55 (1)	6.59,00 (13)	1.56,09 (6)	14.29,54 (11)
10	Jochem Uytdehaage	Netherlands	162.549	38,99 (18)	6.56,73 (9)	1.56,23 (8)	14.22,87 (9)
11	Sergey Tsybenko	Kazakhstan	163.423	37,82 (6)	7.00,10 (15)	1.56,77 (11)	14.53,41 (12)
12	Frank Dittrich	Germany	163.615	40,63 (23)	6.49,69 (3)	2.00,29 (22)	13.58,41 (3)
NC13	Derek Parra	United States	118.857	37,98 (7)	7.01,77 (18)	1.56,10 (7)	
NC14	Takahiro Ushiyama	Japan	119.151	37,59 (2)	7.04,71 (19)	1.57,27 (14)	
NC15	K. C. Boutiette	United States	119.522	38,79 (17)	6.59,79 (14)	1.56,26 (9)	
NC16	Cédric Kuentz	France	119.934	38,40 (11)	7.05,61 (20)	1.56,92 (13)	
NC17	Kevin Marshall	Canada	120.073	38,34 (10)	7.01,07 (16)	1.58,88 (18)	
NC18	Mark Knoll	Canada	120.263	39,02 (19)	6.58,77 (12)	1.58,10 (17)	
NC19	Roberto Sighel	Italy	120.543	38,51 (12)	7.01,73 (17)	1.59,58 (20)	
NC20	Jan Friesinger	Germany	120.669	38,78 (16)	7.07,16 (21)	1.57,52 (15)	
NC21	Chris Callis	United States	121.209	38,52 (13)	7.09,09 (22)	1.59,34 (19)	
NC22	Toshihiko Itokawa	Japan	121.872	40,03 (22)	6.57,29 (10)	2.00,34 (23)	
NC23	Eiji Kohara	Japan	122.907	38,21 (8)	7.13,57 (23)	2.04,02 (24)	
NC24	J. P. Shilling	United States	134.483	51,06 *(24)	7.15,53 (24)	1.59,61 (21)	

NQ = Not qualified for the 10000 m (only the best 12 are qualified)
DQ = disqualified

== Women's championships ==
=== Allround results ===
Place	Athlete	Country	Points	500 m	3000 m	1500 m	5000 m
1st place, gold medalist(s)	Anni Friesinger	Germany	169.690	39,99 (1)	4.19,78 (3)	2.03,38 (1)	7.32,78 (6)
2nd place, silver medalist(s)	Claudia Pechstein	Germany	169.791	41,12 (7)	4.18,32 (2)	2.04,35 (2)	7.21,68 (1)
3rd place, bronze medalist(s)	Renate Groenewold	Netherlands	170.133	41,16 (8)	4.16,57 (1)	2.05,13 (4)	7.25,02 (2)
4	Cindy Klassen	Canada	170.630	40,49 (3)	4.23,38 (6)	2.05,00 (3)	7.25,78 (3)
5	Barbara de Loor	Netherlands	171.218	40,81 (5)	4.22,09 (4)	2.05,49 (5)	7.28,97 (4)
6	Varvara Barysheva	Russia	172.692	40,53 (4)	4.28,73 (10)	2.06,25 (6)	7.32,91 (7)
7	Maki Tabata	Japan	173.187	41,41 (11)	4.24,72 (7)	2.06,61 (7)	7.34,54 (9)
8	Tonny de Jong	Netherlands	173.386	41,31 (10)	4.23,35 (5)	2.09,68 (11)	7.29,59 (5)
9	Jennifer Rodriguez	United States	173.482	40,29 (2)	4.28,37 (9)	2.06,85 (9)	7.41,81 (12)
10	Song Li	China	174.799	41,45 (12)	4.29,54 (12)	2.06,81 (8)	7.41,56 (11)
11	Kristina Groves	Canada	176.821	43,28 (21)	4.29,35 (11)	2.09,81 (12)	7.33,80 (8)
12	Svetlana Vysokova	Russia	176.974	42,34 (19)	4.28,11 (8)	2.13,26 (21)	7.35,30 (10)
NQ13	Emese Hunyady	Austria	128.876	40,93 (6)	4.32,26 (15)	2.07,71 (10)	
NQ14	Natalya Polozkova-Kozlova	Russia	130.081	41,25 (9)	4.32,51 (16)	2.10,24 (14)	
NQ15	Nami Nemoto	Japan	130.579	41,95 (14)	4.30,44 (13)	2.10,67 (15)	
NQ16	Emese Dörfler-Antal	Austria	131.111	41,89 (13)	4.32,17 (14)	2.11,58 (20)	
NQ17	Eriko Seo	Japan	131.112	42,00 (15)	4.32,92 (17)	2.10,88 (18)	
NQ18	Yuri Obara	Japan	131.766	42,00 (15)	4.37,04 (21)	2.10,78 (16)	
NQ19	Krisztina Egyed	Hungary	131.876	42,13 (18)	4.36,80 (20)	2.10,84 (17)	
NQ20	Nicole Slot	Canada	132.766	43,35 (22)	4.34,36 (19)	2.11,07 (19)	
NQ21	Tara Risling	Canada	132.771	42,44 (20)	4.34,29 (18)	2.13,85 (22)	
NQ22	Ann Driscoll	United States	134.208	44,03 (23)	4.40,77 (23)	2.10,15 (13)	
NQ23	Anne Therese Tveter	Norway	137.701	44,79 (24)	4.39,67 (22)	2.18,90 (23)	
DQ2	Gunda Niemann-Stirnemann	Germany	42.010	42,01 (17)	DQ	NS	

NQ = Not qualified for the 5000 m (only the best 12 are qualified)
DQ = disqualified

== Rules ==
All 24 participating skaters are allowed to skate the first three distances; 12 skaters may take part on the fourth distance. These 12 skaters are determined by taking the standings on the longest of the first three distances, as well as the samalog standings after three distances, and comparing these lists as follows:

1. Skaters among the top 12 on both lists are qualified.
2. To make up a total of 12, skaters are then added in order of their best rank on either list. Samalog standings take precedence over the longest-distance standings in the event of a tie.
