= Speed skating at the 2002 Winter Olympics – Men's 1500 metres =

Speed skating at the Olympics

Men's 1500 metres at the XIX Olympic Winter Games
- Venue: Utah Olympic Oval
- Dates: February 19, 2002
- Competitors: 48 from 17 nations
- Winning time: 1:43.95 WR

Medalists
1st place, gold medalist(s)		Derek Parra; United States
2nd place, silver medalist(s)		Jochem Uytdehaage; Netherlands
3rd place, bronze medalist(s)		Ådne Søndrål; Norway

The men's 1500 m speed skating competition for the 2002 Winter Olympics was held in Salt Lake City, Utah, United States.

In reverse order of the 5000 metres, Jochem Uytdehaage first broke the world record, only to see it bettered by Derek Parra, who won the third US skating gold of the Games. He was the first Mexican-American to medal in a winter sport.

== Records ==
Prior to this competition, the existing world and Olympic records were as follows.

World record	Lee Kyou-hyuk (KOR)	1:45.20	Calgary, Canada	15 March 2001
Olympic record	Ådne Søndrål (NOR)	1:47.87	Nagano, Japan	12 February 1998

The following new world and Olympic records were set during this competition.

Date	Round	Athlete	Country	Time	OR	WR
19 February	Pair 1	Dmitry Shepel	Russia	1:45.98	OR	
19 February	Pair 5	Nick Pearson	United States	1:45.51	OR	
19 February	Pair 9	Jochem Uytdehaage	Netherlands	1:44.57	OR	WR
19 February	Pair 21	Derek Parra	United States	1:43.95	OR	WR

== Results ==
Rank	Pair	Lane	Name	Country	Time	Time behind	Notes
1st place, gold medalist(s)	21	O	Derek Parra	United States	1:43.95	–	WR
2nd place, silver medalist(s)	9	O	Jochem Uytdehaage	Netherlands	1:44.57	+0.62	
3rd place, bronze medalist(s)	23	O	Ådne Søndrål	Norway	1:45.26	+1.31	
4	23	I	Joey Cheek	United States	1:45.34	+1.39	
5	16	O	Ids Postma	Netherlands	1:45.41	+1.46	
6	5	O	Nick Pearson	United States	1:45.51	+1.56	
7	15	O	Jan Bos	Netherlands	1:45.63	+1.68	
8	18	I	Lee Kyou-hyuk	South Korea	1:45.82	+1.87	
9	14	I	Rintje Ritsma	Netherlands	1:45.86	+1.91	
10	14	O	Yevgeny Lalenkov	Russia	1:45.97	+2.02	
11	1	O	Dmitry Shepel	Russia	1:45.98	+2.03	
12	22	O	Dustin Molicki	Canada	1:46.00	+2.05	
13	9	I	Janne Hanninen	Finland	1:46.04	+2.09	
14	19	O	J. P. Shilling	United States	1:46.29	+2.34	
15	18	I	Hiroyuki Noake	Japan	1:46.38	+2.43	
16	8	O	Sergey Tsybenko	Kazakhstan	1:46.40	+2.45	
17	24	O	Kevin Marshall	Canada	1:46.75	+2.80	
18	21	I	Steven Elm	Canada	1:46.99	+3.04	
19	1	I	Radik Bikchantayev	Kazakhstan	1:47.04	+3.09	
20	22	I	Petter Andersen	Norway	1:47.21	+3.26	
21	20	O	Choi Jae-bong	South Korea	1:47.26	+3.31	
22	16	I	Aleksandr Kibalko	Russia	1:47.63	+3.68	
23	13	I	Takaharu Nakajima	Japan	1:47.64	+3.69	
24	17	I	Stefano Donagrandi	Italy	1:47.72	+3.77	
25	19	I	Keiji Shirahata	Japan	1:47.78	+3.83	
26	5	I	Enrico Fabris	Italy	1:47.83	+3.88	
27	4	I	Vesa Rosendahl	Finland	1:48.02	+4.07	
28	12	I	Philippe Marois	Canada	1:48.13	+4.18	
29	2	I	Cedric Kuentz	France	1:48.20	+4.25	
30	15	I	Zsolt Balo	Hungary	1:48.27	+4.32	
31	3	O	Roberto Sighel	Italy	1:48.40	+4.45	
32	20	I	Risto Rosendahl	Finland	1:48.57	+4.62	
33	4	O	Mun Jun	South Korea	1:48.58	+4.63	
34	24	I	Yusuke Imai	Japan	1:48.76	+4.81	
35	2	I	Eskil Ervik	Norway	1:49.24	+5.29	
36	11	I	Nikolay Uliyanin	Kazakhstan	1:49.42	+5.47	
37	11	O	Vadim Sayutin	Russia	1:49.45	+5.50	
38	6	I	Johan Röjler	Sweden	1:49.50	+5.55	
39	12	O	Vladimir Kostin	Kazakhstan	1:49.57	+5.62	
40	10	I	Igor Makovetsky	Belarus	1:50.15	+6.20	
41	17	O	Jan Friesinger	Germany	1:50.26	+6.31	
42	10	O	Yeo Sang-Yeop	South Korea	1:50.70	+6.75	
43	3	I	Andrey Fomin	Ukraine	1:51.02	+7.07	
43	8	I	Frank Dittrich	Germany	1:51.02	+7.07	
45	7	O	Ma Yongbin	China	1:51.81	+7.86	
46	6	O	Liu Guangbin	China	1:52.01	+8.06	
47	7	O	Aleksey Khatylyov	Belarus	1:52.87	+8.92	
48	13	O	Christian Breuer	Germany	DNF		
