= 1994 World Allround Speed Skating Championships =

International speed skating competition

1994 World Allround Speed Skating Championships for Men
- Venue: Ruddalens IP, Gothenburg, Sweden
- Dates: 12–13 March
- Competitors: 34 skaters from 19 nations

Medalist men
1st place, gold medalist(s)		Johann Olav Koss	NOR
2nd place, silver medalist(s)		Ids Postma	NED
3rd place, bronze medalist(s)		Rintje Ritsma	NED

The World Allround Speed Skating Championships for Men took place on 12 and 13 March 1994 in Gothenburg at the Ruddalens IP ice rink.

Title holder was the Netherlander Falko Zandstra. This was Johann Olav Koss third title.

== Classification ==
Rank	Skater	Country	Points Samalog	500m	5000m	1500m	10,000m
1st place, gold medalist(s)	Johann Olav Koss	Norway	167.233	39.44 (9)	7:14.21 (2)	1:59.68 (gold)	14:49.58 (gold)
2nd place, silver medalist(s)	Ids Postma	Netherlands	168.457	38.39 (gold)	7:27.68 (19)	2:01.66 (6)	14:54.93 (3)
3rd place, bronze medalist(s)	Rintje Ritsma	Netherlands	168.566	39.38 (8)	7:18.96 (6)	2:01.25 (4)	14:57.48 (4)
4	Keiji Shirahata	Japan	168.976	39.14 (6)	7:18.72 (5)	2:01.50 (5)	15:09.28 (6)
5	Hiroyuki Noake	Japan	169.094	38.50 (2)	7:20.25 (8)	2:00.95 (3)	15:25.07 (10)
6	Kjell Storelid	Norway	170.027	41.19 (26)	7:11.63 (gold)	2:03.27 (13)	14:51.68 (2)
7	Andrej Anoefrijenko	Russia	170.137	38.96 (5)	7:23.89 (14)	2:00.76 (2)	15:30.70 (11)
8	Bart Veldkamp	Netherlands	170.323	40.19 (14)	7:20.95 (9)	2:03.48 (14)	14:57.56 (5)
9	Steinar Johansen	Norway	170.780	39.97 (12)	7:19.40 (7)	2:02.33 (10)	15:21.89 (9)
10	Jonas Schön	Sweden	172.418	40.26 (15)	7:21.53 (10)	2:05.76 (24)	15:21.71 (8)
11	René Taubenrauch	Germany	173.342	41.47 (29)	7:18.35 (4)	2:06.89 (29)	15:14.82 (7)
12	Jaromir Radke	Poland	174.394	41.96 (31)	7:16.05 (3)	2:06.28 (27)	15:34.73 (12)
NC13	Roberto Sighel	Italy	123.921	38.91 (4)	7:21.55 (11)	2:02.57 (11)	–
NC14	Naoki Kotake	Japan	124.848	38.90 (3)	7:33.05 (26)	2:01.93 (7)	–
NC15	Neal Marshall	Canada	124.964	39.28 (7)	7:30.14 (22)	2:02.01 (8)	–
NC16	Yuri Shulga	Ukraine	126.179	39.70 (10)	7:30.06 (21)	2:04.42 (16)	–
NC17	Brian Wanek	United States	126.474	40.33 (16)	7:25.54 (17)	2:04.77 (20)	–
NC18	Yevgeny Sanarov	Kazakhstan	126.644	40.65 (20)	7:24.11 (15)	2:04.75 (18)	–
NC19	Michael Hadschieff	Austria	126.676	40.01 (13)	7:30.83 (23)	2:04.75 (18)	–
NC20	Frank Dittrich	Germany	126.980	40.77 (22)	7:22.84 (13)	2:05.78 (26)	–
NC21	Mike Hall	Canada	127.127	40.96 (24)	7:24.84 (16)	2:05.05 (21)	–
NC22	Sergey Kozlov	Russia	127.163	39.95 (11)	7:34.97 (27)	2:05.15 (22)	–
NC23	Desző Horváth	Romania	127.450	40.76 (21)	7:32.60 (24)	2:04.29 (15)	–
NC24	K.C. Boutiette	United States	127.557	40.53 (19)	7:33.04 (25)	2:05.17 (23)	–
NC25	Dave Tamburrino	United States	127.744	40.42 (18)	7:42.48 (31)	2:03.23 (12)	–
NC26	Per Bengtsson	Sweden	128.072	41.23 (28)	7:26.69 (18)	2:06.52 (28)	–
NC27	Boris Oevarov	Ukraine	128.670	40.36 (17)	7:48.27 (33)	2:04.45 (17)	–
NC28	Giorgio Baroni	Italy	129.065	40.89 (23)	7:42.55 (32)	2:05.76 (24)	–
NC29	Timo Järvinen	Finland	130.143	41.72 (30)	7:37.70 (29)	2:07.96 (31)	–
NC30	Maurizio De Monte	Italy	130.145	41.22 (27)	7:41.89 (30)	2:08.21 (32)	–
NC31	Martin Feigenwinter	Switzerland	130.255	42.33 (32)	7:27.96 (20)	2:09.39 (34)	–
NC32	Cédric Kuentz	France	130.469	41.05 (25)	7:50.26 (34)	2:07.18 (30)	–
NC33	Jiří Kyncl	Czech Republic	130.679	42.40 (33)	7:35.36 (28)	2:08.23 (33)	–
NC34	Radik Bikchentayev	Kazakhstan	144.072	59.06 * (34)	7:22.59 (12)	2:02.26 (9)	–

* = Fell

== Attribution ==
In Dutch
