= 1994 World Allround Speed Skating Championships for women =

International speed skating competition

1994 World Allround Speed Skating Championships for Women
- Venue: High Mountain Altitude Rink, Butte, Montana, United States
- Dates: 5–6 February
- Competitors: 23 from 11 nations

Medalist women
1st place, gold medalist(s)		Emese Hunyady	AUT
2nd place, silver medalist(s)		Ulrike Adeberg	GER
3rd place, bronze medalist(s)		Mihaela Dascălu	ROM

The 55th edition of the World Allround Speed Skating Championships for Women took place on 5 and 6 February 1994 in Butte at the High Mountain Altitude Rink.

Title holder was Gunda Kleemann from Germany.

== Distance medalists ==
Event	Gold (gold)	Silver (silver)	Bronze (bronze)
500m	Ulrike Adeberg	Emese Hunyady	Emese Dörfler-Antal
3000m	Emese Hunyady	Ulrike Adeberg	Mihaela Dascălu
1500m	Emese Hunyady	Mihaela Dascălu	Anni Friesinger
5000m	Emese Hunyady	Anni Friesinger	Lyudmila Prokasheva

== Classification ==
Rank	Skater	Country	Points Samalog	500m	3000m	1500m	5000m
1st place, gold medalist(s)	Emese Hunyady	Austria	177.480	41.80 (2)	4:30.59 (gold)	2:07.13 (gold)	8:02.06 (gold)
2nd place, silver medalist(s)	Ulrike Adeberg	Germany	178.733	41.36 (gold)	4:30.71 (2)	2:09.09 (5)	8:12.25 (8)
3rd place, bronze medalist(s)	Mihaela Dascălu	Romania	178.943	42.25 (6)	4:32.91 (3)	2:07.22 (2)	8:08.02 (6)
4	Noriko Munekata	Japan	179.570	42.43 (10)	4:34.98 (6)	2:08.27 (4)	8:05.54 (4)
5	Anni Friesinger	Germany	180.401	43.47 (18)	4:34.87 (5)	2:07.93 (3)	8:04.77 (2)
6	Mie Uehara	Japan	180.670	42.61 (11)	4:32.93 (4)	2:11.79 (7)	8:06.42 (5)
7	Emese Dörfler-Antal	Austria	182.073	41.84 (3)	4:40.22 (12)	2:12.46 (8)	8:13.77 (10)
8	Anette Tønsberg	Norway	182.171	43.18 (15)	4:38.42 (9)	2:09.86 (6)	8:13.02 (9)
9	Lyudmila Prokasheva	Kazakhstan	182.350	43.49 (19)	4:35.54 (7)	2:13.32 (9)	8:04.97 (3)
10	Ingrid Liepa	Canada	184.143	42.02 (5)	4:37.26 (8)	2:14.58 (12)	8:30.53 (12)
11	Heike Warnicke-Schalling	Germany	184.357	43.60 (20)	4:38.87 (10)	2:15.57 (13)	8:10.89 (7)
12	Tonny de Jong	Netherlands	184.978	42.99 (13)	4:39.41 (11)	2:15.83 (15)	8:21.44 (11)
NC13	Moira d'Andrea	United States	133.400	41.89 (4)	4:40.44 (13)	2:14.31 (11)	–
NC14	Barbara de Loor	Netherlands	133.924	42.42 (9)	4:41.27 (15)	2:13.88 (10)	–
NC15	Chiharu Nozaki	Japan	134.480	42.39 (7)	4:41.22 (14)	2:15.66 (14)	–
NC16	Cerasela Hordobețiu	Romania	135.240	42.40 (8)	4:44.22 (17)	2:16.41 (17)	–
NC17	Tatyana Trapeznikova	Russia	136.339	43.18 (15)	4:44.74 (18)	2:17.11 (19)	–
NC18	Christina Schön	Sweden	137.378	44.66 (23)	4:44.15 (16)	2:16.08 (16)	–
NC19	Chantal Bailey	United States	137.907	42.89 (12)	4:54.77 (20)	2:17.67 (20)	–
NC20	Hege Langli	Norway	138.999	43.89 (21)	4:53.84 (19)	2:18.41 (21)	–
NC21	Kenzhesh Sarsekenova-Orynbayeva	Kazakhstan	139.789	43.11 (14)	4:58.90 (22)	2:20.59 (22)	–
NC22	Sylvie Cantin	Canada	140.153	43.44 (17)	4:57.92 (21)	2:21.18 (23)	–
NC23	Tatyana Sachkova	Russia	141.334	44.39 (22)	5:07.49 * (23)	2:17.09 (18)	–

* = Fell

== Attribution ==
In Dutch
