= 2002 World Allround Speed Skating Championships =

International speed skating competition

World Allround Speed Skating Championships
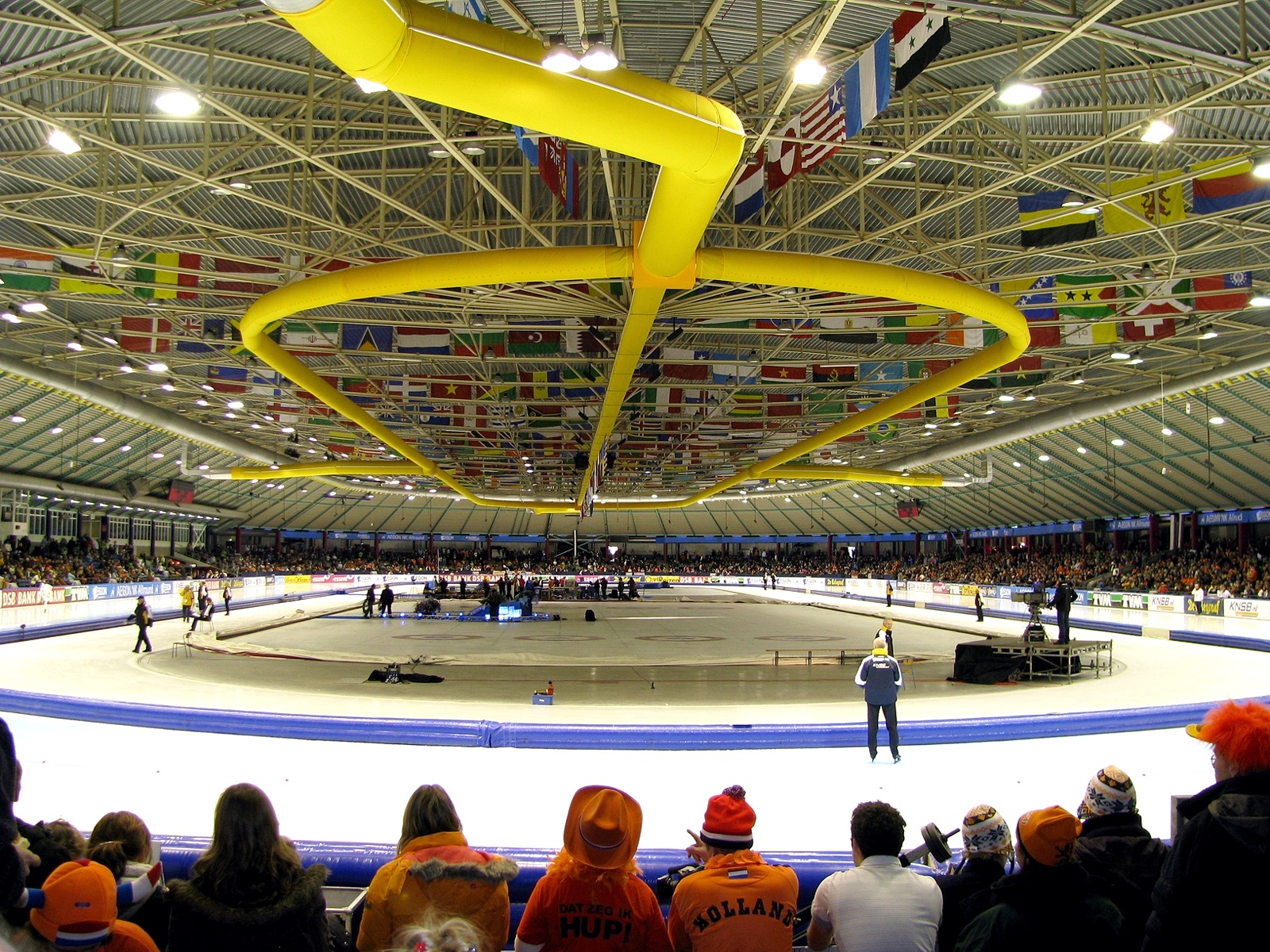
- Thialf
- Location: Heerenveen, Netherlands
- Venue: Thialf
- Dates: 15-17 March
- Competitors: 48

Medalist men
1st place, gold medalist(s)		Jochem Uytdehaage	NED
2nd place, silver medalist(s)		Dmitri Shepel	RUS
3rd place, bronze medalist(s)		Derek Parra	USA

Medalist women
1st place, gold medalist(s)		Anni Friesinger	GER
2nd place, silver medalist(s)		Cindy Klassen	CAN
3rd place, bronze medalist(s)		Claudia Pechstein	GER

The 2002 World Allround Speed Skating Championships were held in Thialf in Heerenveen, Netherlands, on 15, 16 and 17 March 2002.

The German Anni Friesinger and the Dutch Jochem Uytdehaage became the world champions.

== Men championships ==
Place	Athlete	Country	Points	500 m	5000 m	1500 m	10000 m
1st place, gold medalist(s)	Jochem Uytdehaage	Netherlands	152.482 WR	36,59 (5)	6.30,27 (1)	1.49,51 (4)	13.27,25 (1)
2nd place, silver medalist(s)	Dmitri Shepel	Russia	153.116	36,39 (1)	6.34,23 (5)	1.48,44 (1)	13.43,14 (6)
3rd place, bronze medalist(s)	Derek Parra	United States	153.661	36,47 (3)	6.35,70 (7)	1.48,56 (2)	13.48,71 (7)
4	Carl Verheijen	Netherlands	154.551	37,74 (18)	6.32,50 (3)	1.50,54 (11)	13.34,30 (2)
5	Dustin Molicki	Canada	155.202	36,99 (11)	6.40,98 (10)	1.49,49 (3)	13.52,36 (9)
6	Paweł Zygmunt	Poland	155.216	37,92 (21)	6.35,31 (6)	1.51,02 (12)	13.35,18 (3)
7	Roberto Sighel	Italy	155.462	36,93 (10)	6.43,13 (12)	1.49,89 (7)	13.51,79 (8)
8	Keiji Shirahata	Japan	155.555	37,55 (17)	6.39,01 (8)	1.51,42 (15)	13.39,29 (5)
9	Bart Veldkamp	Belgium	155.826	38,35 (22)	6.33,30 (4)	1.51,91 (19)	13.36,86 (4)
10	Yevgeni Lalenkov	Russia	156.372	36,50 (4)	6.49,45 (17)	1.49,70 (6)	14.07,22 (11)
11	Petter Andersen	Norway	157.457	36,39 (1)	6.51,00 (21)	1.50,33 (9)	14.23,82 (12)
12	Eskil Ervik	Norway	158.826	39,81 (24)	6.39,17 (9)	1.52,02 (20)	13.55,19 (10)
NQ13	Takahiro Ushiyama	Japan	114.334	36,75 (6)	6.48,41 (16)	1.50,23 (8)	
NQ14	JP Shilling	United States	114.380	36,90 (9)	6.49,54 (18)	1.49,58 (5)	
NQ15	Steven Elm	Canada	114.884	37,30 (13)	6.48,01 (15)	1.50,35 (10)	
NQ16	Radik Biktshentayev	Kazakhstan	115.013	37,43 (15)	6.45,43 (13)	1.51,12 (13)	
NQ17	Kevin Marshall	Canada	115.522	36,83 (7)	6.56,46 (23)	1.51,14 (14)	
NQ18	Jan Friesinger	Germany	115.576	37,43 (15)	6.49,76 (19)	1.51,51 (16)	
NQ19	Sergei Tsybenko	Kazakhstan	115.857	36,83 (7)	6.57,57 (24)	1.51,81 (18)	
NQ20	Jamie Ivey	Canada	115.958	37,40 (14)	6.51,65 (22)	1.52,18 (21)	
NQ21	Jondon Trevena	United States	115.982	37,75 (19)	6.50,62 (20)	1.51,51 (16)	
NQ22	Johan Röjler	Sweden	116.907	37,90 (20)	6.45,91 (14)	1.55,25 (23)	
NQ23	Toshihiko Itokawa	Japan	116.980	38,96 (23)	6.41,70 (11)	1.53,55 (22)	
DQ3	Gianni Romme	Netherlands	112.293	37,11 (12)	6.30,40 (2)	1.48,34 (DQ)	

NQ = Not qualified for the 10000 m (only the best 12 are qualified)
DQ = disqualified

== Women championships ==
=== Allround results ===
Place	Athlete	Country	Points	500 m	1500 m	3000 m	5000 m
1st place, gold medalist(s)	Anni Friesinger	Germany	162.260	39,45 (3)	1.56,43 (1)	4.08,02 (1)	7.06,64 (3)
2nd place, silver medalist(s)	Cindy Klassen	Canada	162.472	39,16 (2)	1.56,88 (2)	4.11,20 (3)	7.04,86 (2)
3rd place, bronze medalist(s)	Claudia Pechstein	Germany	163.114	39,92 (6)	1.58,53 (4)	4.09,32 (2)	'7.01,31 (1)
4	Jennifer Rodriguez	United States	163.735	38,59 (1)	1.57,71 (3)	4.11,84 (6)	7.19,36 (11)
5	Varvara Barysheva	Russia	164.805	39,71 (5)	2.00,10 (9)	4.11,60 (5)	7.11,29 (5)
6	Renate Groenewold	Netherlands	165.295	40,69 (9)	1.58,81 (5)	4.12,15 (7)	7.09,77 (4)
7	Tonny de Jong	Netherlands	165.417	39,65 (4)	1.59,75 (8)	4.15,34 (11)	7.12,95 (7)
8	Maki Tabata	Japan	165.489	39,92 (6)	1.59,06 (7)	4.13,29 (8)	7.16,68 (10)
9	Marja Vis	Netherlands	165.754	40,78 (11)	1.58,93 (6)	4.11,45 (4)	7.14,23 (9)
10	Nami Nemoto	Japan	167.970	41,29 (18)	2.02,41 (12)	4.15,04 (9)	7.13,71 (8)
11	Emese Hunyady	Austria	168.043	40,24 (8)	2.00,46 (10)	4.19,38 (16)	7.24,20 (12)
12	Svetlana Vysokova	Russia	168.087	41,27 (17)	2.03,10 (19)	4.15,17 (10)	7.12,56 (6)
NQ13	Daniela Anschütz	Germany	124.963	40,96 (13)	2.02,98 (18)	4.18,06 (14)	
NQ14	Ann Driscoll	United States	125.136	40,69 (9)	2.02,89 (17)	4.20,90 (20)	
NQ15	Valentina Yakshina	Russia	125.321	41,80 (22)	2.02,36 (11)	4.16,41 (12)	
NQ16	Kristina Groves	Canada	125.469	41,84 (23)	2.02,60 (13)	4.16,58 (13)	
NQ17	Lucille Opitz	Germany	125.490	41,08 (14)	2.02,73 (14)	4.21,00 (21)	
NQ18	Anette Tønsberg	Norway	125.508	41,54 (20)	2.02,74 (15)	4.18,33 (15)	
NQ19	Lyudmila Prokasheva	Kazakhstan	125.746	41,23 (16)	2.03,43 (21)	4.20,24 (19)	
NQ20	Eriko Ishino	Japan	126.032	41,15 (15)	2.02,84 (16)	4.23,62 (23)	
NQ21	Wieteke Cramer	Netherlands	126.174	40,87 (12)	2.03,34 (20)	4.25,15 (24)	
NQ22	Eriko Seo	Japan	126.368	41,37 (19)	2.04,93 (23)	4.20,13 (18)	
NQ23	Catherine Raney	United States	126.743	42,00 (24)	2.04,18 (22)	4.20,10 (17)	
NQ24	Tatiana Shatshkova	Russia	127.298	41,73 (21)	2.05,05 (24)	4.23,31 (22)	

NQ = Not qualified for the 5000 m (only the best 12 are qualified)
DQ = disqualified

== Rules ==
All 24 participating skaters are allowed to skate the first three distances; 12 skaters may take part on the fourth distance. These 12 skaters are determined by taking the standings on the longest of the first three distances, as well as the samalog standings after three distances, and comparing these lists as follows:

1. Skaters among the top 12 on both lists are qualified.
2. To make up a total of 12, skaters are then added in order of their best rank on either list. Samalog standings take precedence over the longest-distance standings in the event of a tie.
