= Speed skating at the 2002 Winter Olympics – Men's 5000 metres =

Speed skating at the Olympics

Men's 5000 metres at the XIX Olympic Winter Games
- Pictogram for speed skating
- Venue: Utah Olympic Oval
- Dates: February 9, 2002
- Competitors: 32 from 14 nations
- Winning time: 6:14.66 WR

Medalists
1st place, gold medalist(s)		Jochem Uytdehaage; Netherlands
2nd place, silver medalist(s)		Derek Parra; United States
3rd place, bronze medalist(s)		Jens Boden; Germany

The Men's 5000 m speed skating competition for the 2002 Winter Olympics was held in Salt Lake City, Utah, United States. Derek Parra and Jens Boden broke their personal bests by 15 seconds to win surprise medals, while Jochem Uytdehaage skated a new world record.

== Records ==
Prior to this competition, the existing world and Olympic records were as follows.

World record	Gianni Romme (NED)	6:18.72	Calgary, Canada	30 January 2000
Olympic record	Gianni Romme (NED)	6:22.20	Nagano, Japan	8 February 1998

The following new world and Olympic records were set during this competition.

Date	Round	Athlete	Country	Time	OR	WR
9 February	Pair 5	Jens Boden	Germany	6:21.73	OR	
9 February	Pair 12	Derek Parra	United States	6:17.98	OR	WR
9 February	Pair 15	Jochem Uytdehaage	Netherlands	6:14.66	OR	WR

== Results ==
Rank	Pair	Lane	Name	Country	Time	Time behind	Notes
1st place, gold medalist(s)	15	O	Jochem Uytdehaage	Netherlands	6:14.66	-	WR
2nd place, silver medalist(s)	12	I	Derek Parra	United States	6:17.98	+3.32	
3rd place, bronze medalist(s)	5	I	Jens Boden	Germany	6:21.73	+7.07	
4	9	I	Dmitry Shepel	Russia	6:21.85	+7.19	
5	2	O	K. C. Boutiette	United States	6:22.97	+8.31	
6	13	O	Carl Verheijen	Netherlands	6:24.71	+10.05	
7	9	O	Roberto Sighel	Italy	6:25.11	+10.45	
8	5	O	Bart Veldkamp	Belgium	6:25.88	+11.22	
9	11	O	Frank Dittrich	Germany	6:25.89	+11.23	
10	10	O	Lasse Sætre	Norway	6:25.92	+11.26	
11	12	O	Dustin Molicki	Canada	6:26.29	+11.63	
12	16	I	Toshihiko Itokawa	Japan	6:27.52	+12.86	
13	10	I	Keiji Shirahata	Japan	6:28.95	+14.29	
14	13	I	Pawel Zygmunt	Poland	6:29.71	+15.05	
15	8	O	Jondon Trevena	United States	6:30.15	+15.49	
16	6	O	Enrico Fabris	Italy	6:30.19	+15.53	
17	8	I	Hiroki Hirako	Japan	6:30.46	+15.80	
18	4	O	Mark Knoll	Canada	6:30.63	+15.97	
19	7	O	Radik Bikchentayev	Kazakhstan	6:31.47	+16.81	
20	1	O	Stefano Donagrandi	Italy	6:32.37	+17.71	
21	15	I	Eskil Ervik	Norway	6:32.80	+18.14	
22	6	I	Johan Röjler	Sweden	6:33.18	+18.52	
23	3	I	Steven Elm	Canada	6:34.76	+20.10	
24	3	O	Cedric Kuentz	France	6:35.05	+20.39	
25	14	I	Vadim Sayutin	Russia	6:35.33	+20.67	
26	14	O	Stian Bjørge	Norway	6:36.04	+21.38	
27	11	I	Yury Kokhanets	Russia	6:36.48	+21.82	
28	1	I	Lee Seung-hwan	South Korea	6:37.67	+23.01	
29	4	I	Sergey Ilyushchenko	Kazakhstan	6:38.09	+23.43	
30	16	O	Bob de Jong	Netherlands	6:43.97	+29.31	
31	2	I	Vladimir Kostin	Kazakhstan	6:44.10	+29.44	
32	7	I	Rene Taubenrauch	Germany	7:19.76	+65.10	
