= Jens Boden =

German speed skater (born 1978)

Olympic medal record

Men's speed skating

Representing Germany
Bronze medal – third place	2002 Salt Lake City	5000 m

Jens Boden (born 29 August 1978) is a German former competitive speed skater, who won the bronze medal in the 5000 metres at the 2002 Winter Olympics.

Boden was born on August 29, 1978 in Dresden, Sachsen, Germany (then part of East Germany).

At 23 years old, he competed in the 2002 Winter Olympics in Salt Lake City, where he beat his personal best by 15 seconds to win a bronze in the 5000 meters. His time of 6:21.73 broke the world record, but Jochem Uytdehaage and Derek Parra also skated under the world record to win gold and silver respectively. Boden also finished fifth in the 10,000 meters at the same Olympics.

At the 2006 Winter Olympics, he finished 20th in the 5000 meters. Boden retired in 2007.

== Personal records ==
Personal records
Men's speed skating
Event	Result	Date	Location	Notes
500 m	38.90	2000-01-22	Calgary	
1500 m	1:53.14	2002-01-26	Calgary	
5000 m	6:20.15	2005-11-19	Salt Lake City	
10000 m	13:23.43	2002-02-22	Salt Lake City	
