= Ma Yongbin =

Chinese speed skater

Personal information
- Nationality: Chinese
- Born: 20 April 1981 (age 43)

Sport
- Sport: Speed skating

Ma Yongbin (born 20 April 1981) is a Chinese speed skater. He competed in the men's 1500 metres event at the 2002 Winter Olympics.
