= Philippe Marois =

Canadian speed skater

Personal information
- Born: 13 October 1980 (age 44); Stoneham-et-Tewkesbury, Quebec, Canada

Sport
- Sport: Speed skating

Philippe Marois (born 13 October 1980) is a Canadian speed skater. He competed in the men's 1500 metres event at the 2002 Winter Olympics.
