= Bart Veldkamp =

Dutch speed skater

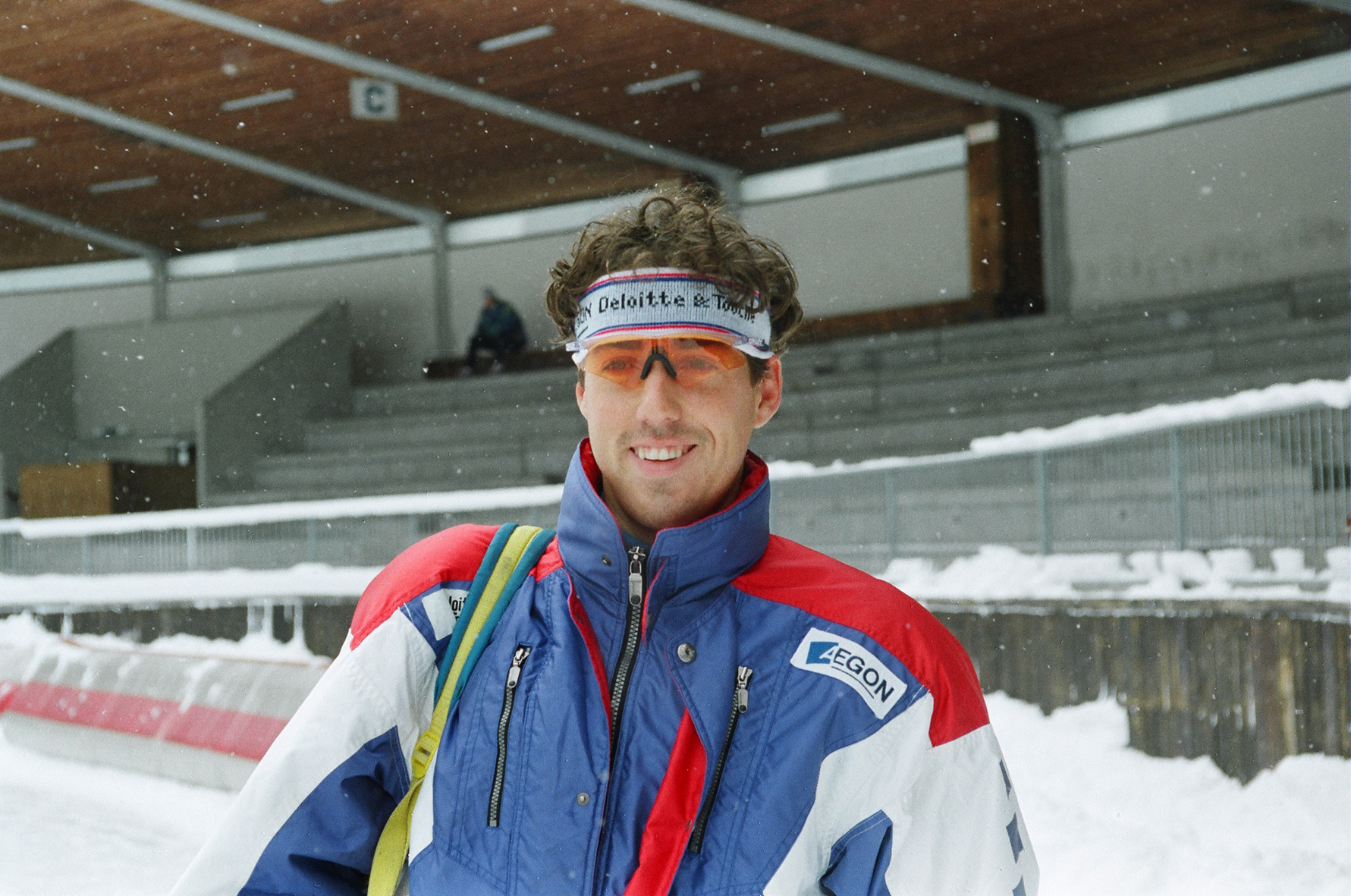

Personal information
- Nationality: Belgian
- Born: 22 November 1967 (age 58) The Hague, Netherlands
- Height: 1.81 m (5 ft 11 in)
- Weight: 84 kg (185 lb)

Sport
- Country: Netherlands (1989–1995); Belgium (1995–2006)
- Sport: Speed skating
- Turned pro: 1989
- Coached by: Ab Krook; Hans Veldkamp
- Retired: 2006

Achievements and titles
- Personal best(s): 500 m: 37.55 (2000); 1000 m: 1:12.80 (2005); 1500 m: 1:49.00 (2001); 3000 m: 3:47.56; 2006); 5000 m: 6:23.64 (2001); 10 000 m: 13:27.48 (2002)
Medal record
Men's speed skating
Olympic Games
Representing the Netherlands
| Gold medal – first place | 1992 Albertville | 10000 m |
| Bronze medal – third place | 1994 Lillehammer | 10000 m |
Representing Belgium
| Bronze medal – third place | 1998 Nagano | 5000 m |
World Championships
Representing the Netherlands
| Bronze medal – third place | 1990 Innsbruck | Allround |
| Bronze medal – third place | 1991 Heerenveen | Allround |
Representing Belgium
| Silver medal – second place | 1996 Hamar | 10000 m |
| Silver medal – second place | 1999 Heerenveen | 5000 m |
| Bronze medal – third place | 1998 Calgary | 5000 m |
| Bronze medal – third place | 2001 Budapest | Allround |
European Championships
Representing the Netherlands
| Gold medal – first place | 1990 Heerenveen | Allround |
| Bronze medal – third place | 1991 Sarajevo | Allround |
Representing Belgium
| Silver medal – second place | 2001 Baselga di Pinè | Allround |

Bart Veldkamp (Dutch pronunciation: [bɑrt ˈfɛltkɑmp]; (Note: Surname in isolation: [ˈvɛltkɑmp].) born 22 November 1967) is a retired speed skater, who represented the Netherlands and later Belgium in international competitions, including the Winter Olympics. He currently is the national speed skating coach of Belgium.

== Speed skating ==
In 1990, Bart Veldkamp won the European Allround Championships and came very close to repeating that feat 11 years later in 2001, finishing 2nd. At the 1992 Winter Olympics, he won a gold medal on the 10,000 m. Mainly due to this achievement, Veldkamp was named Dutch Sportsman of the Year in 1992. Before the 1994 Winter Olympics, he was dissatisfied with the qualifying procedures for tournaments and became a Belgian. In Belgium there was (and still is) no speed skating tradition, so qualifying for tournaments became simple because there were no other speed skaters to compete with.

In Lillehammer at the 1994 Winter Olympics, Veldkamp won a bronze medal on the 10,000 m for the Netherlands. The next Olympic medal he won was as a Belgian at the 1998 Winter Olympics on the 5,000 m, in which he became the first skater ever to break the 6:30 barrier on that distance, but his time was beaten later that same day by former compatriots Rintje Ritsma and Gianni Romme. His bronze medal was the first ever Olympic medal in speed skating for Belgium.

In 1997, Veldkamp participated in the Elfstedentocht. In 2003, he announced that the 2006 Winter Olympics at Turin would be his third Winter Olympics as a Belgian, his fifth overall, and definitely his last. At these 2006 Winter Olympics, Veldkamp finished 13th on the 5,000 m and 14th on the 10,000 m and ended his career afterwards.

== Commentary and coaching ==
After his career Veldkamp became a sports commentator for the NOS to analyze speed skating races. He also appeared on several other TV shows such as Peking Express and Wildebeesten.

In the 2006/2007 winter season Veldkamp trained four Kenyan athletes, for the first time ever on ice, for a Dutch TV show. The goal was to let them skate the 200 km long alternative Elfstedentocht at the Weissensee in Austria.

He currently is the national speed skating coach of Belgium.

== Records ==
=== Personal records ===
Personal records
Men's Speed skating
| Event | Result | Date | Location | Notes |
| 500 m | 37.55 | 15 January 2000 | Hamar | |
| 1000 m | 1:12.80 | 20 November 2005 | Salt Lake City | |
| 1500 m | 1:49.00 | 4 March 2001 | Calgary | |
| 3000 m | 3:47.56 | 5 February 2006 | Turin | |
| 5000 m | 6:23.64 | 2 March 2001 | Calgary | |
| 10000 m | 13:27.48 | 22 February 2002 | Salt Lake City | |

Source: SpeedskatingResults.com

By 12 January 2014, Veldkamp was placed 107th with a score of 152.621 points on the Adelskalender, the ranking list for all-time personal bests. His highest ranking ever on the Adelskalender was a 5th place.

=== World records ===
Veldkamp skated one world record:

| Event | Result | Date | Location | Note |
|---|---|---|---|---|
| 3000 m | 3:48.91 | 20 March 1998 | Calgary | World record until 19 March 1999 |

Source: SpeedSkatingStats.com

== Tournament overview ==
| Season | Dutch Championships Single Distances | Dutch Championships Allround | European Championships Allround | Olympic Games | World Championships Single Distances | World Championships Allround |
|---|---|---|---|---|---|---|
| 1986–87 | THE HAGUE UTRECHT 19th 10000m | | | | | |
| 1987–88 | HEERENVEEN (bronze) 5000m 4th 10000m | | | | | |
| 1988–89 | HEERENVEEN 24th 500m 11th 1500m 4th 5000m 4th 10000m | THE HAGUE 11th 500m (gold) 5000m 4th 1500m (bronze) 10000m (bronze) overall | | | | OSLO 30th 500m (silver) 5000m 19th 1500m 5th 10000m 10th overall |
| 1989–90 | HEERENVEEN 23rd 500m 24th 1500m (bronze) 5000m (silver) 10000m | ASSEN 18th 500m (gold) 5000m (bronze) 1500m (gold) 10000m 6th overall | HEERENVEEN 15th 500m (gold) 5000m 8th 1500m (gold) 10000m (gold) overall | | | INNSBRUCK 22nd 500m (gold) 5000m 6th 1500m (gold) 10000m (bronze) overall |
| 1990–91 | THE HAGUE (silver) 1500m (gold) 5000m (gold) 10000m | ALKMAAR 11th 500m (silver) 5000m (bronze) 1500m (gold) 10000m (silver) overall | SARAJEVO 14th 500m (silver) 5000m 4th 1500m (silver) 10000m (bronze) overall | | | HEERENVEEN 23rd 500m (silver) 5000m 11th 1500m (silver) 10000m (bronze) overall |
| 1991–92 | HEERENVEEN 7th 1500m (gold) 5000m (gold) 10000m | ALKMAAR 9th 500m (gold) 5000m (silver) 1500m (gold) 10000m (silver) overall | HEERENVEEN 12th 500m (gold) 5000m 6th 1500m 5th 10000m 5th overall | ALBERTVILLE 5th 1500m 5th 5000m (gold) 10000m | | CALGARY 15th 500m 32nd 5000m 32nd 1500m DNQ 10000m NC overall(29th) |
| 1992–93 | DEVENTER NC 500m 8th 1500m (bronze) 5000m (silver) 10000m | ASSEN 12th 500m (gold) 5000m (bronze) 1500m (gold) 10000m (silver) overall | HEERENVEEN 14th 500m (bronze) 5000m 12th 1500m (silver) 10000m 4th overall | | | HAMAR 18th 500m (bronze) 5000m 9th 1500m (gold) 10000m 4th overall |
| 1993–94 | HEERENVEEN 13th 1500m (bronze) 5000m 4th 10000m | THE HAGUE 7th 500m (bronze) 5000m 7th 1500m (gold) 10000m (bronze) overall | | LILLEHAMMER 5th 5000m (bronze) 10000m | | GOTHENBURG 14th 500m 9th 5000m 14th 1500m 5th 10000m 8th overall |
| 1994–95 | THE HAGUE DNF 10000m 7th 1500m 6th 5000m | ASSEN 9th 500m (gold) 5000m 6th 1500m (bronze) 10000m (bronze) overall | | | | |
| 1995–96 | | | DAVOS 15th 500m (gold) 5000m 11th 1500m (gold) 10000m 4th overall | | HAMAR 4th 5000m (silver) 10000m | INZELL 24th 500m (gold) 5000m 18th 1500m 4th 10000m 9th overall |
| 1996–97 | | | HEERENVEEN 24th 500m 15th 5000m 16th 1500m DNQ 10000m NC overall(18th) | | WARSAW 4th 5000m 4th 10000m | NAGANO 26th 500m (gold) 5000m 11th 1500m (gold) 10000m 6th overall |
| 1997–98 | | | HELSINKI 16th 500m (silver) 5000m 9th 1500m (gold) 10000m 4th overall | NAGANO 17th 1500m (bronze) 5000m 4th 10000m | CALGARY 18th 1500m (bronze) 5000m 5th 10000m | HEERENVEEN 27th 500m (silver) 5000m 5th 1500m (gold) 10000m 4th overall |
| 1998–99 | | | HEERENVEEN 14th 500m (silver) 5000m 13th 1500m (gold) 10000m 4th overall | | HEERENVEEN (silver) 5000m 5th 10000m | HAMAR 20th 500m 7th 5000m 18th 1500m (gold) 10000m 5th overall |
| 1999–2000 | | | HAMAR 8th 500m (silver) 5000m 10th 1500m 5th 10000m 5th overall | | NAGANO 6th 5000m 5th 10000m | MILWAUKEE 19th 500m (bronze) 5000m 7th 1500m (silver) 10000m 4th overall |
| 2000–01 | | | BASELGA di PINÈ 22nd 500m (gold) 5000m 6th 1500m (gold) 10000m (silver) overall | | SALT LAKE CITY 18th 5000m 8th 10000m | BUDAPEST 20th 500m (gold) 5000m 12th 1500m (gold) 10000m (bronze) overall |
| 2001–02 | | | ERFURT 25th 500m (bronze) 5000m 25th 1500m 6th 10000m 13th overall | SALT LAKE CITY 8th 5000m 9th 10000m | | HEERENVEEN 22nd 500m 4th 5000m 19th 1500m 4th 10000m 9th overall |
| 2002–03 | | | HEERENVEEN 24th 500m 9th 5000m 21st 1500m 4th 10000m 14th overall | | BERLIN 18th 5000m 10th 10000m | |
| 2003–04 | | | HEERENVEEN 26th 500m 16th 5000m 21st 1500m DNQ 10000m NC overall(22nd) | | SEOUL 18th 5000m | |
| 2004–05 | | | HEERENVEEN 24th 500m 10th 5000m 20th 1500m 9th 10000m 12th overall | | INZELL 9th 5000m 10th 10000m | MOSCOW 17th 500m 8th 5000m 17th 1500m 8th 10000m 11th overall |
| 2005–06 | | | HAMAR 22nd 500m 15th 5000m 20th 1500m DNQ 10000m NC overall(20th) | TURIN 13th 5000m 14th 10000m | | |

NC = No classification
DNQ = Did not qualify

== Medals won ==
| Championship | Gold (gold) | Silver (silver) | Bronze (bronze) |
|---|---|---|---|
| European Allround classification | 1 | 1 | 1 |
| Olympic Games | 1 | 0 | 2 |
| World Single Distances | 0 | 2 | 1 |
| World Allround classification | 0 | 0 | 3 |
| Dutch Allround classification | 0 | 3 | 3 |
| Dutch Single Distances | 4 | 3 | 4 |

== Medals ==
An overview of medals won by Veldkamp at important championships, listing the years in which he won each medal:

| Championship | Gold medal | Silver medal | Bronze medal |
|---|---|---|---|
| Winter Olympics | 1992 (10000 m) | | 1994 (10000 m); 1998 (5000 m) |
| World Allround | | | 1990; 1991; 2001 |
| World Single Distance | | 1996 (10000 m); 1999 (5000 m) | 1998 (5000 m) |
| European Allround | 1990 | 2001 | 1991 |
| Dutch Allround | | 1991; 1992; 1993 | 1989; 1994; 1995 |
| Dutch Single Distance | 1991 (5000 m); 1991 (10000 m); 1992 (5000 m); 1992 (10000 m) | 1990 (10000 m); 1991 (1500 m); 1993 (10000 m) | 1988 (5000 m); 1990 (5000 m); 1993 (5000 m); 1994 (5000 m) |

== Notes ==
Records
| Preceded by Jelmer Beulenkamp | Men's 3,000 m speed skating world record 21 March 1998 – 19 March 1999 | Succeeded by Steven Elm |
Awards
| New award | Ard Schenk Award; 1990 | Succeeded by Dries van Wijhe |
| Preceded by Arnold Vanderlyde; Edwin Jongejans | Dutch Sportsman of the Year; 1992 | Succeeded by Falko Zandstra |
