= Protestant Church of Dearsum =

Church in Dearsum, Netherlands

Protestant church of Dearsum Saint Nicholas church
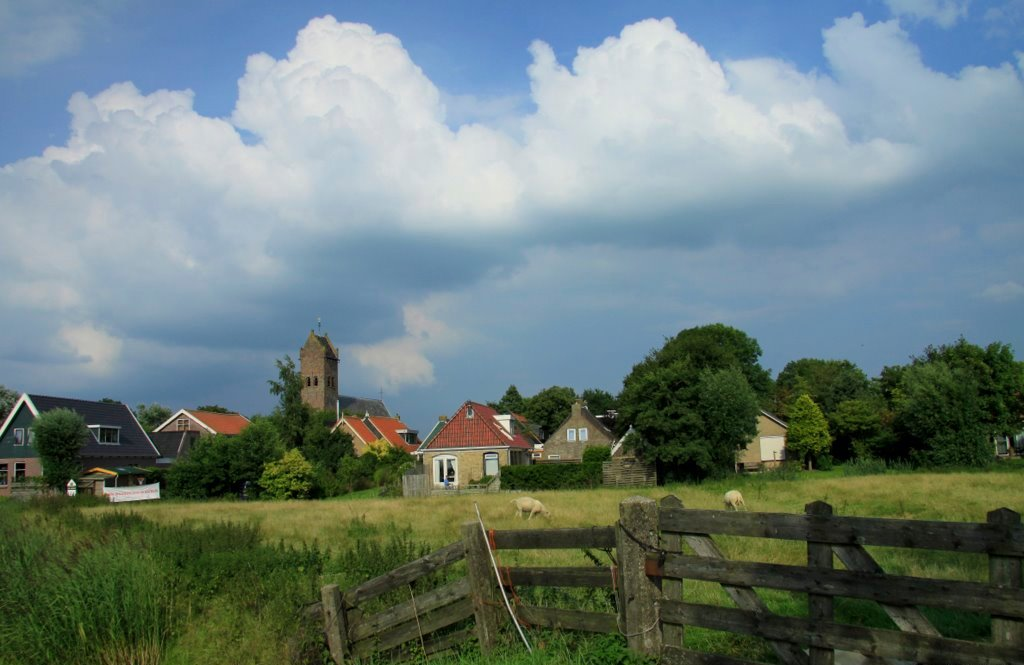
- Church of Dearsum
- Protestant church of Dearsum; Saint Nicholas church
- 53.0869°N 5.7159°E

History
- Dedication: Before the reformation, to Saint Nicholas

Specifications
- Materials: Brick

The Protestant Church of Dearsum or Saint Nicholas church is a religious building in Dearsum, Netherlands, one of medieval churches in Friesland.

It is a Romanesque church from c. 1200 with a 13th-century tower built out of red brick. In the 16th century four large windows were added to the south side. The Pipe organ was built in 1895 by the Gebroeders Adema and was restored in 1916 and 1983 by Bakker & Timmenga.

The church is located on the Dearsum 34 and was once a Roman Catholic church dedicated to Saint Nicholas but became a Protestant church after the Protestant Reformation. It is listed as a Rijksmonument, number 32301.
