= Ab Krook =

Dutch speed skating coach (1944–2020)

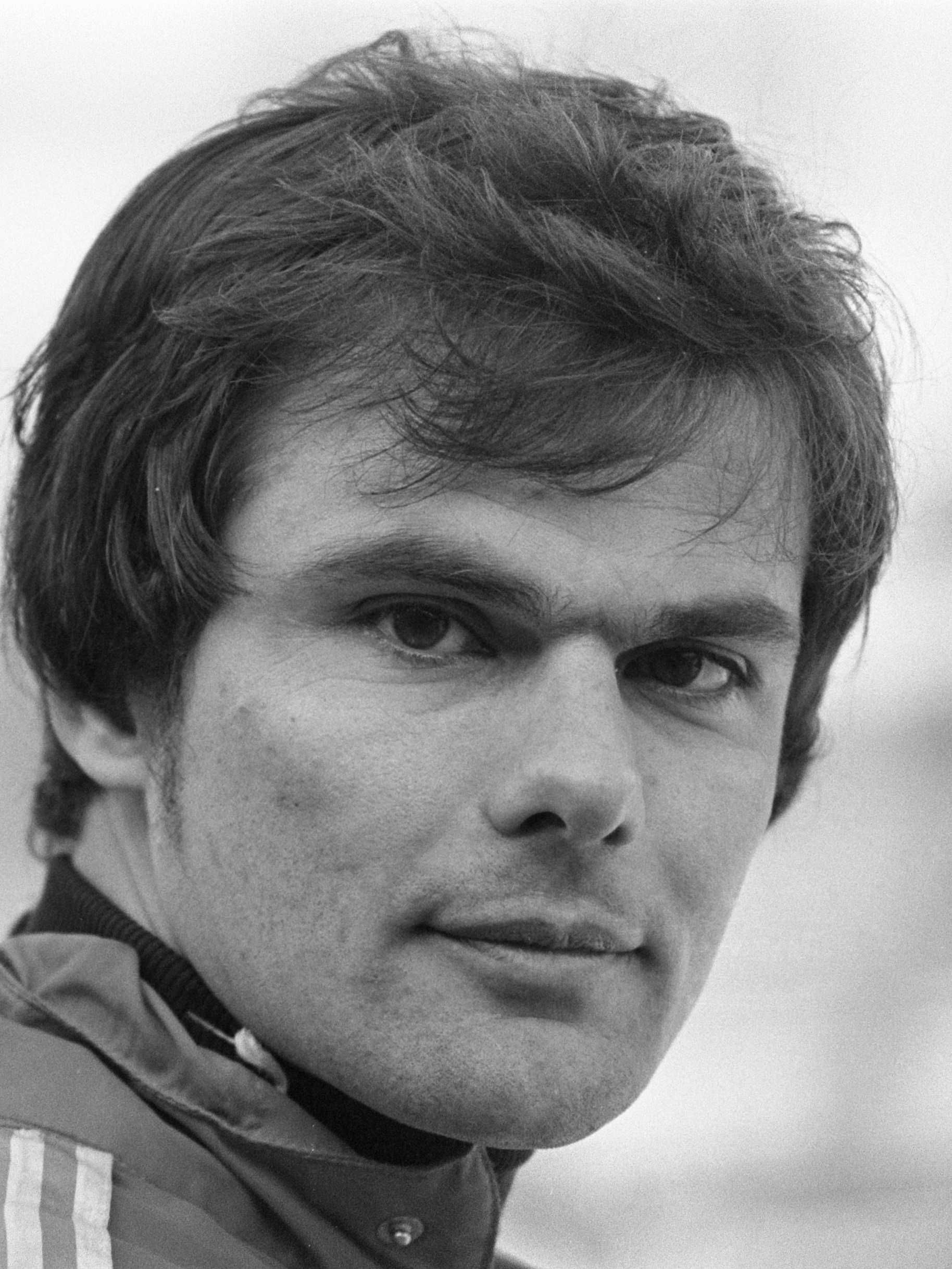
- Krook in 1976
- Born: 18 June 1944; Oud-Loosdrecht, Netherlands
- Died: 13 October 2020 (aged 76); Blaricum, Netherlands
- Occupation: Speed skating coach

Ab Krook (18 June 1944 – 13 October 2020) was a Dutch speed skating coach between 1977 and 2006. He was also a speed skater between 1967 and 1971. He competed at Dutch National Championships, but never reached the top. After being coach he held other functions within Dutch speed skating.

== Biography ==
Krook was born in Oud-Loosdrecht on 18 June 1944. He was coach of the Dutch national women’s team between 1977 and 1981; between 1981 and 1988 of the West German National Team; and from 1988 of the Dutch national men’s team.

Krook had partaken in nine Winter Olympics. He was coach during eight Winter Olympics and later served as a coordinator. Among others he coached Annie Borckink winning the Olympic gold medal and Ria Visser the silver medal at the 1980 Winter Olympics. He coached Bart Veldkamp winning gold at the 1992 Winter Olympics.

Krook suffered a cerebral infarction in 2018. He died from complication of a second infarction on 13 October 2020 in Blaricum, aged 76.
