= Dearsum =

Deersum Dearsum
- Village
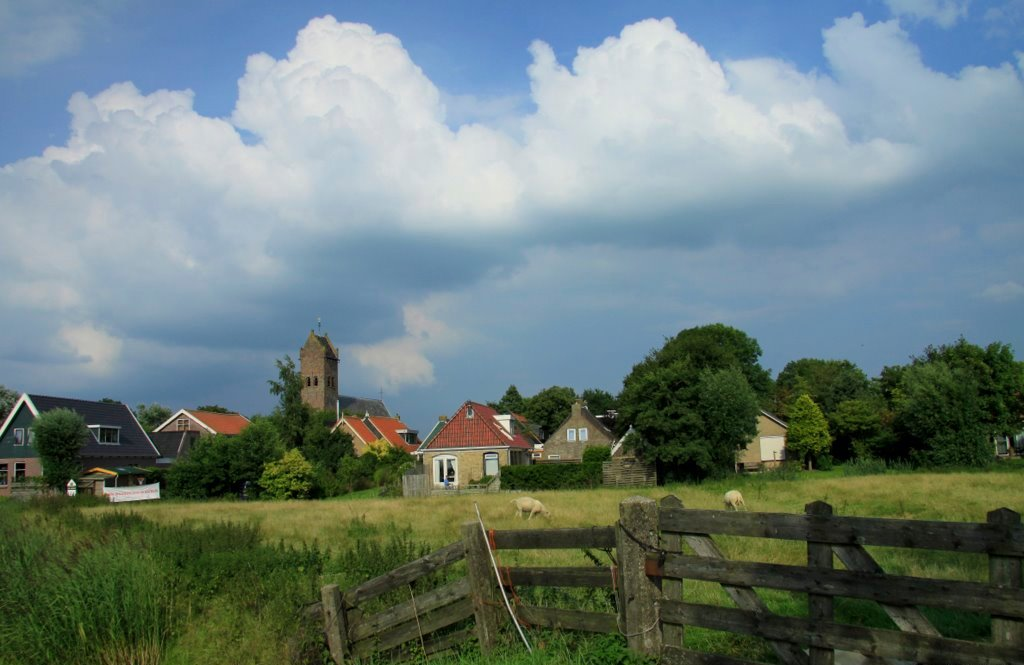

- Flag Coat of arms

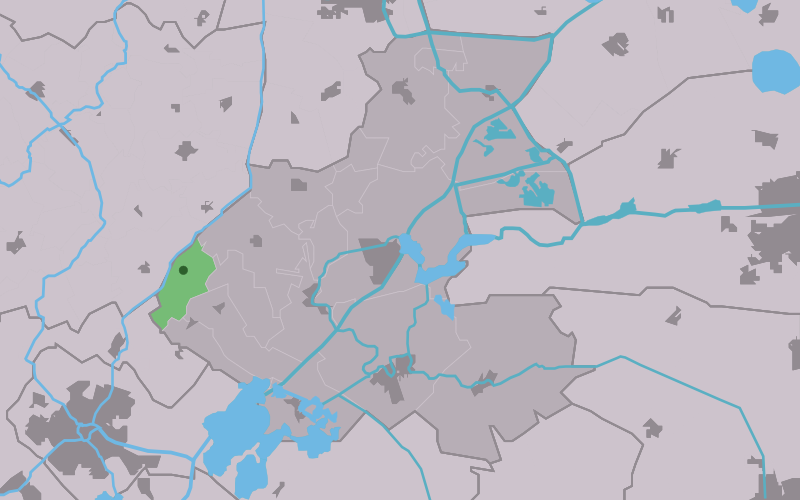
- Location in the former Boarnsterhim municipality

- Location in the Netherlands Deersum (Netherlands)
- Coordinates: 53°5′12″N 5°42′56″E
- Country: Netherlands
- Province: Friesland
- Municipality: Súdwest-Fryslân

Area
  - Total: 4.45 km^{2} (1.72 sq mi)
- Elevation: 0.1 m (0.33 ft)

Population (2021)
  - Total: 115
  - Density: 25.8/km^{2} (66.9/sq mi)
- Time zone: UTC+1 (CET)
  - Summer (DST): UTC+2 (CEST)
- Postal code: 8644
- Dialing code: 0566

Dearsum (Dutch: Deersum) is a small village in Súdwest-Fryslân municipality in the province of Friesland, the Netherlands. It has a population of around 130 as of January 2017.

== History ==
Dearsum is founded at the MiddelSeawall on the east side of the Middelzee. There are archaeological finds in the area made of for the era. after the Middelzee had silted there were significant pieces of new land in the village.

Before 2014, the village was part of the Boarnsterhim municipality and before 1984 it belonged to Rauwerdhem municipality.

=== Church ===
The church of Dearsum is Built at the late 12th century, but when after all the thoughts replaced an earlier, wooden church. The Church has a number of Romanesque features, but also Gothic elements, who so the result will be subsequent adjustments. So there is a closed masonry arch in the north wall (15th century) and pointed arch windows in the south wall (16th century). Those windows are – just like the only round arch window in the south wall – divided by stone. The tower with gable roof has on all four sides two round arched belfry.

==== Interior ====
The church has a plain interior. yet are a few extraordinary to view. Such is the south side of the choir the piscina. It is in the wall fitted sink for washing of the stuff that the priest used at the Eucharist. The piscina is at a pointed arch alcove. Above the middle A stone list (the only one in Friesland), where the ampoules could be put on. If the priest rinse the dishes, he let God's water over God's field flowing. In the north wall is also considerable alcove, will be used as storage. The pulpit is from the 19th century and at a renovation put against the shaft wall. below is an altar stone from the Roman Catholic time. He is recognized by the consecration crosses at the corners and in the middle. The banks are new.

==== Organ ====
The organ was built by the Leeuwarder brothers Adema in 1875. It seems like that this is the first instrument of the church was. The literature makes no mention about an older organ, which by the Adema-organ was replaced.

== Community ==
=== Population ===
Historical population
| Year | Pop. | ±% p.a. |
|---|---|---|
| 1954 | 214 | — |
| 1959 | 218 | +0.37% |
| 1964 | 205 | −1.22% |
| 1969 | 172 | −3.45% |
| 1973 | 137 | −5.53% |
| 2003 | 146 | +0.21% |
| 2004 | 143 | −2.05% |
| 2005 | 139 | −2.80% |
| 2006 | 137 | −1.44% |
| 2007 | 142 | +3.65% |
| 2008 | 141 | −0.70% |
| 2009 | 131 | −7.09% |

=== Notable people ===
- Ids Postma (born 1973), a former skater and winner of a gold medal at the Winter Olympics 1998 1000 meter.

== Notable buildings ==
- The Protestant church of Dearsum

== Gallery ==
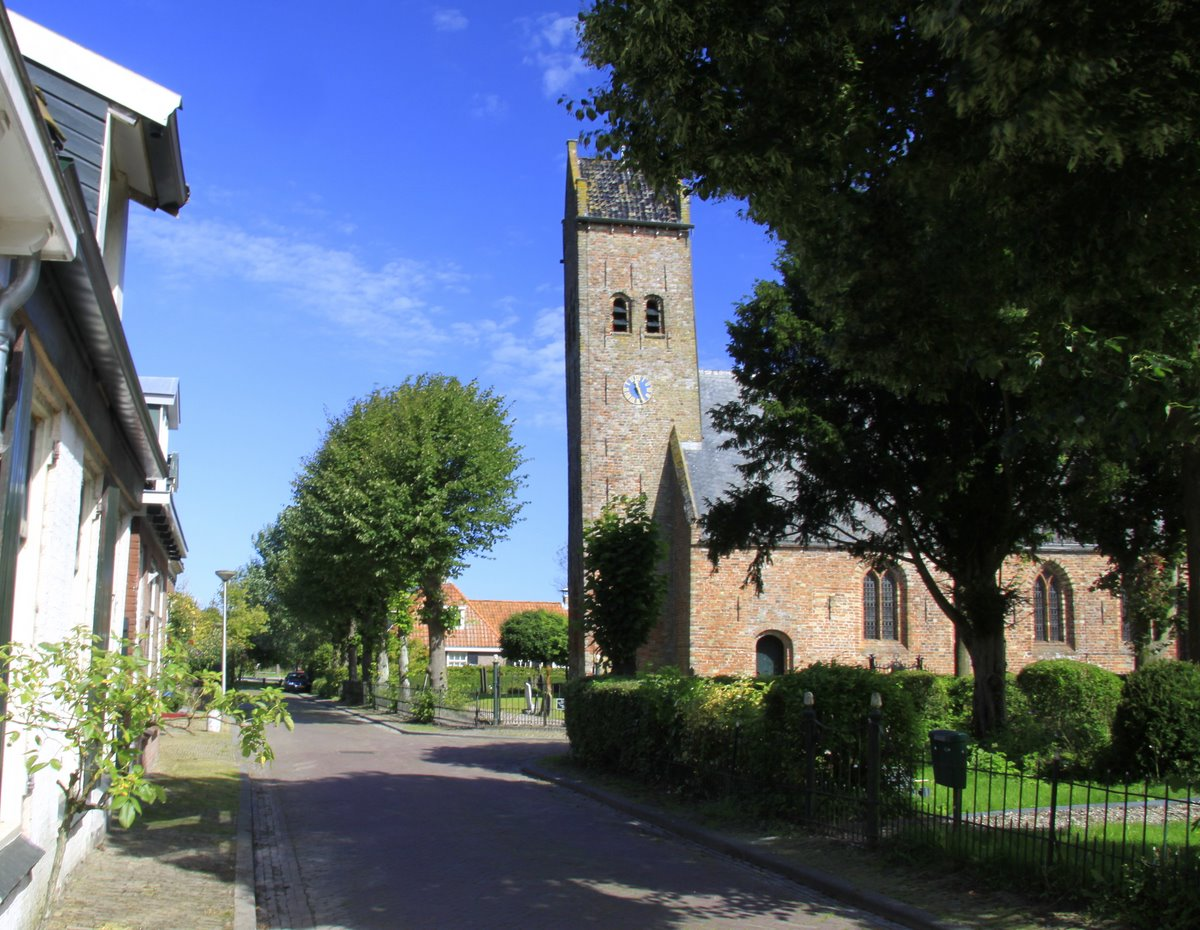
St Nicholas' Church

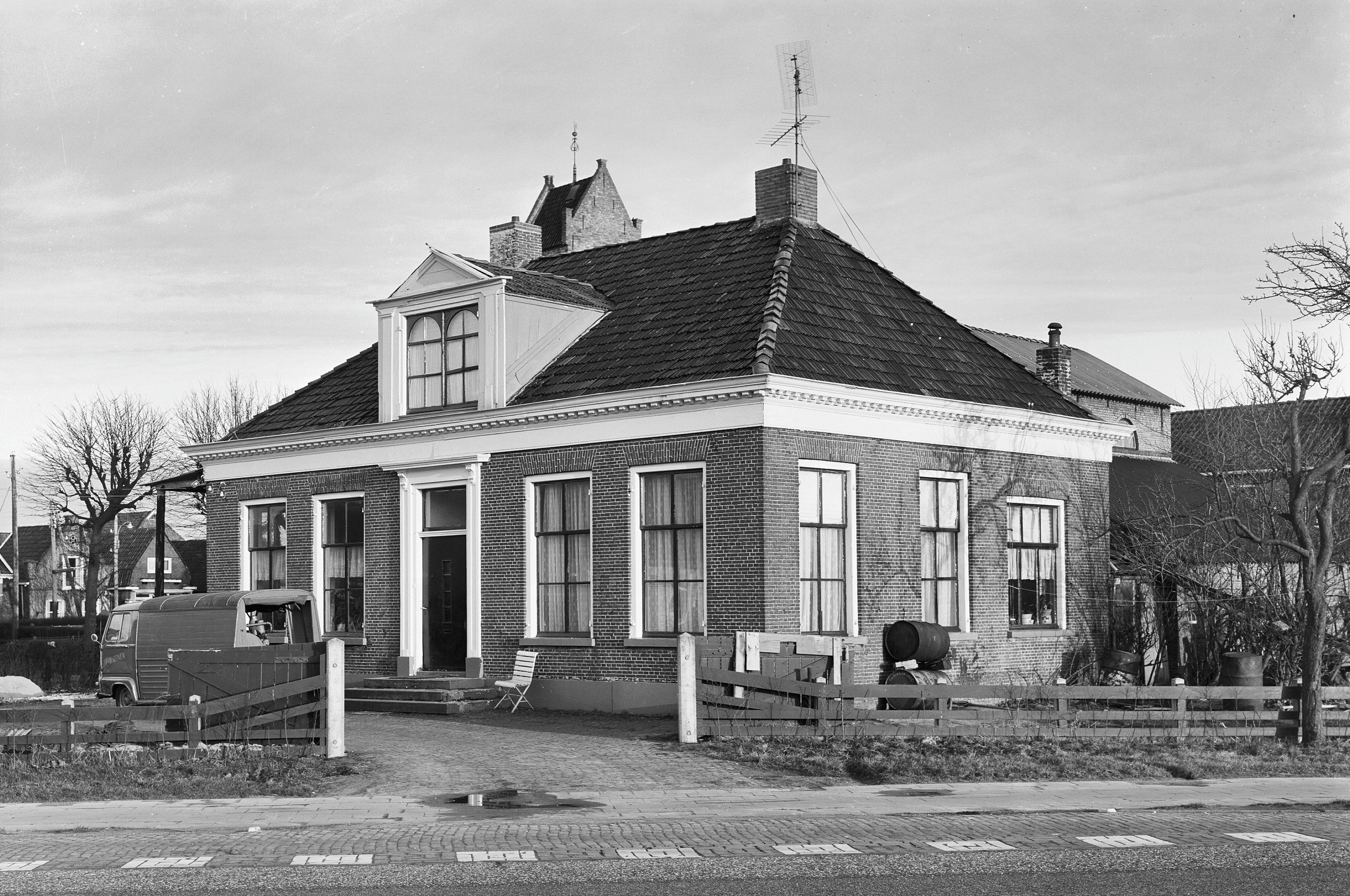
House in Dearsum (1968)
