= Adeberg =

Adeberg is a surname. Notable people with the surname include:

- Peter Adeberg (born 1968), German speed skater
- Ulrike Adeberg (born 1970), German speed skater
