= Ids Postma =

Dutch speed skater

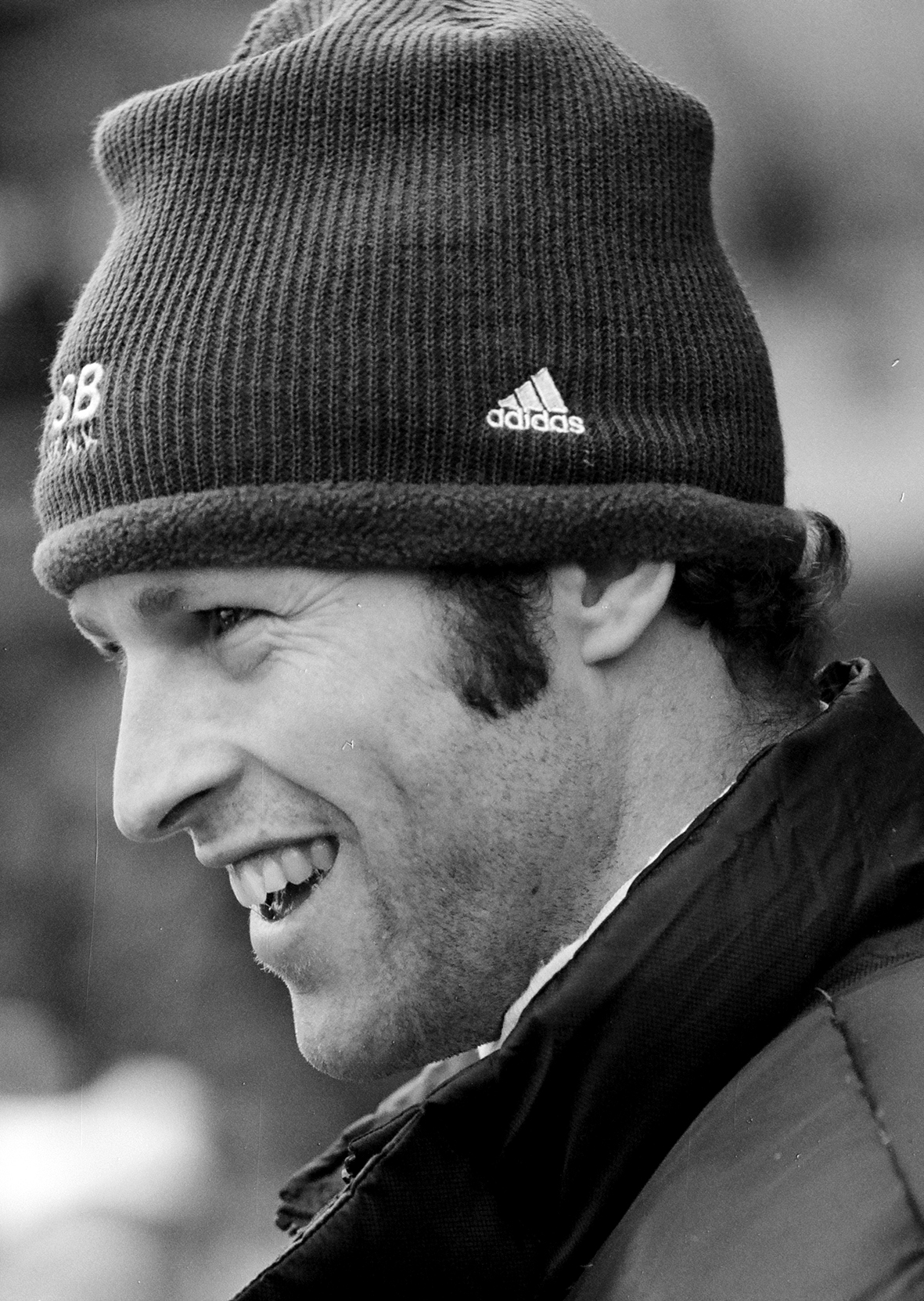

Personal information
- Nationality: Dutch
- Born: Ids Hylke Postma; 28 December 1973 (age 52) Dearsum, Netherlands
- Height: 1.90 m (6 ft 3 in)
- Weight: 93 kg (205 lb)
- Spouse: Anni Friesinger-Postma (2009)

Sport
- Country: Netherlands
- Sport: Speed skating
- Turned pro: 1993
- Coached by: Henk Gemser
- Retired: 2004

Achievements and titles
- Personal best(s): 500 m: 35.99 (2001); 1000 m: 1:09.15 (2002); 1500 m: 1:45.41 (2002); 3000 m: 3:58.53 (2002); 5000 m: 6:32.92 (2000); 10 000 m: 13:45.91 (1998)
Medal record
Men's speed skating
Representing the Netherlands
Olympic Games
Gold medal – first place	1998 Nagano	1,000 m
Silver medal – second place	1998 Nagano	1,500 m
World Championships
Gold medal – first place	1997 Nagano	Allround
Gold medal – first place	1998 Heerenveen	Allround
Silver medal – second place	1994 Gothenburg	Allround
Silver medal – second place	1996 Inzell	Allround
Silver medal – second place	2000 Milwaukee	Allround
Silver medal – second place	2001 Budapest	Allround
Bronze medal – third place	2003 Gothenburg	Allround
European Championships
Gold medal – first place	1997 Heerenveen	Allround
Silver medal – second place	1996 Heerenveen	Allround
Bronze medal – third place	2000 Hamar	Allround
Bronze medal – third place	2001 Baselga di Piné	Allround
World Single Distance Championships
Gold medal – first place	1996 Hamar	5000 m
Gold medal – first place	1999 Heerenveen	1500 m
Gold medal – first place	2000 Nagano	1500 m
Silver medal – second place	1998 Calgary	1500 m

Ids Hylke Postma (born 28 December 1973) is a Dutch former speed skater. He is an Olympic gold medalist and former world champion.

In 1993 Postma finished 2nd at the Speedskating World Championships for Juniors. In his first year as senior skater, he became Dutch Allround Champion, finished second behind Johann Olav Koss at the World Allround Championships, and came 4th in the European Championships, but nevertheless did not qualify for the Dutch Olympic team. In 1997 Postma won both the European Allround Championships and the World Allround Championships.

His greatest success came in 1998 when he became World Allround Champion again, also setting a world record in the point-sum combination, and won two Olympic medals at the Olympic Games in Nagano. He won the 1,000 meters event and placed second at his specialty, the 1,500 meters, just behind Ådne Søndrål from Norway. Also in 1998, he was the first skater who skated an official world record on the 1,500 meters below 1:50.00: Postma did this in Berlin. Erben Wennemars had done the same the summer before, but that time was not ratified by the International Skating Union. Postma's record did not last long, because a few hours later Kevin Overland skated to a new record in Calgary.

Postma is also a three-time World Champion in the World Single Distance Championships. He won the 5,000 meters in 1996 and the 1,500 meters in 1999 and 2000.

In October 2004 Postma announced his retirement and nowadays he lives on his farm in Deersum. He married German speed skater Anni Friesinger on 11 August 2009 in Salzburg. The couple will not live together on the farm until renovations are complete. In August 2011, she gave birth to a daughter. He previously had a relationship with Renske Vellinga, until her death in a car crash in 1994.

== Records ==
=== Personal records ===
Personal records
Men's Speed skating
Event	Result	Date	Location	Notes
500 m	35.99	30 November 2001	Salt Lake City	
1000 m	1:09.15	16 February 2002	Salt Lake City	
1500 m	1:45.41	19 February 2002	Salt Lake City	
3000 m	3:58.53	15 November 2002	Inzell	
5000 m	6:32.92	30 January 2000	Calgary	
10000 m	13:45.91	15 March 1998	Heerenveen	

Source: www.isu.org & SpeedskatingResults.com

=== World records ===
Event	Result	Date	Location	Notes
1500 m	1:49.81	29 November 1997	Berlin	
Big combination	153.367	15 March 1998	Heerenveen	

Source: SpeedSkatingStats.com

== Tournament overview ==
Season	Dutch Championships Single Distances	Dutch Championships Allround	European Championships Allround	World Championships Allround	Dutch Championships Sprint	World Championships Sprint	World Championships Single Distances	Olympic Games	World Cup GWC	World Championships Junior Allround
1992–93	DEVENTER 16th 500m 7th 1000m 11th 1500m									BASELGA di PINÈ (bronze) 500m (bronze) 1500m 8th 1000m (bronze) 5000m (silver) overall
1993–94	HEERENVEEN NS2 500m (bronze) 1500m 4th 5000m (bronze) 10000m	THE HAGUE (gold) 500m (gold) 5000m (silver) 1500m (silver) 10000m (gold) overall	HAMAR (bronze) 500m 6th 5000m 4th 1500m 6th 10000m 4th overall	GOTHENBURG (gold) 500m 19th 5000m 6th 1500m (bronze) 10000m (silver) overall						
1994–95	THE HAGUE 18th 5000m									
1995–96	GRONINGEN (bronze) 5000m	THE HAGUE (gold) 500m 4th 5000m 4th 1500m (bronze) 10000m (silver) overall	HEERENVEEN (gold) 500m 5th 5000m (gold) 1500m 4th 10000m (silver) overall	INZELL (silver) 500m (bronze) 5000m (silver) 1500m (silver) 10000m (silver) overall			HAMAR 15th 1500m (gold) 5000m		10th 1500m 6th 5000/10000m	
1996–97			HEERENVEEN (gold) 500m (silver) 5000m (gold) 1500m (bronze) 10000m (gold) overall	NAGANO (silver) 500m 8th 5000m (gold) 1500m 4th 10000m (gold) overall			WARSAW 9th 5000m		5th 1500m 10th 5000/10000m	
1997–98	HEERENVEEN (bronze) 1000m 4th 1500m 6th 5000m			HEERENVEEN (gold) 500m (gold) 5000m (gold) 1500m 4th 10000m (gold) overall	4th 500m (silver) 1000m (silver) 500m (gold) 1000m (bronze) overall		CALGARY (silver) 1500m	NAGANO 38th 500m (gold) 1000m (silver) 1500m	(gold) 1500m 19th 5000/10000m	
1998–99	GRONINGEN (bronze) 1000m 4th 1500m 4th 5000m	THE HAGUE (gold) 500m (bronze) 5000m (gold) 1500m 6th 10000m (gold) overall	HEERENVEEN 26th 500m 15th 5000m (bronze) 1500m DNQ 10000m NC overall(26th)		5th 500m 4th 1000m (bronze) 500m (bronze) 1000m 5th overall		HEERENVEEN (gold) 1500m		35th 1000m (silver) 1500m 8th 5000/10000m	
1999–2000		THE HAGUE (silver) 500m 7th 5000m (gold) 1500m 7th 10000m (bronze) overall	HAMAR 4th 500m 6th 5000m (silver) 1500m 12th 10000m (bronze) overall	MILWAUKEE (bronze) 500m 7th 5000m (bronze) 1500m 9th 10000m (silver) overall			NAGANO (gold) 1500m		(silver) 1500m 9th 5000/10000m	
2000–01	THE HAGUE 8th 1000m 9th 1500m 14th 5000m	HEERENVEEN (gold) 500m 8th 5000m (silver) 1500m 7th 10000m (silver) overall	BASELGA di PINÈ (gold) 500m 4th 5000m 4th 1500m 7th 10000m (bronze) overall	BUDAPEST (bronze) 500m (silver) 5000m (gold) 1500m 8th 10000m (silver) overall					8th 1500m	
2001–02	GRONINGEN 7th 1000m 10th 1500m 6th 5000m	ALKMAAR (gold) 500m 7th 5000m (bronze) 1500m 4th 10000m (silver) overall			4th 500m (gold) 1000m 4th 500m (silver) 1000m 4th overall	HAMAR 24th 500m 19th 1000m 21st 500m 12th 1000m 18th overall		SALT LAKE CITY 27th 500m 17th 1000m 5th 1500m	32nd 1000m 15th 1500m	
2002–03	UTRECHT 5th 1500m (bronze) 5000m	ASSEN 4th 500m 9th 5000m 7th 1500m 8th 10000m 6th overall		GOTHENBURG (gold) 500m 4th 5000m 4th 1500m 6th 10000m (bronze) overall			BERLIN 6th 1500m		6th 1500m 16th 5000/10000m	
2003–04	HEERENVEEN (bronze) 1500m 8th 5000m 5th 10000m	EINDHOVEN 4th 500m 5th 5000m 4th 1500m 8th 10000m 5th overall							7th 1500m	

DNQ = Did not qualify for the final distance
NC = No classification

== World Cup overview ==
Season	500 meter												
1994–1995	–	–	–	–	29th	31st	–	–	–	–	–	–	–
1995–1996													
1996–1997													
1997–1998													
1998–1999													
1999–2000													
2000–2001													
2001–2002													
2002–2003													
2003–2004													

Season	1000 meter									
1994–1995	–	–	–	–	32nd	–	–	–	–	–
1995–1996										
1996–1997										
1997–1998										
1998–1999	–	–	–	–	–	–	1st(b)	–	–	
1999–2000										
2000–2001	–	–	–	–	–	–	–	–	–	23rd(b)
2001–2002	–	–	–	28th(b)	–	–	1st(b)			
2002–2003										
2003–2004										

Season	1500 meter					
1994–1995						
1995–1996	–	3rd place, bronze medalist(s)	12th	5th	5th	11th
1996–1997	1st place, gold medalist(s)	1st place, gold medalist(s)	11th	–	6th	–
1997–1998	1st place, gold medalist(s)	2nd place, silver medalist(s)	–	1st place, gold medalist(s)	3rd place, bronze medalist(s)	–
1998–1999	1st place, gold medalist(s)	3rd place, bronze medalist(s)	7th	2nd place, silver medalist(s)	7th	
1999–2000	3rd place, bronze medalist(s)	16th	4th	1st place, gold medalist(s)	3rd place, bronze medalist(s)	
2000–2001	–	–	2nd place, silver medalist(s)	4th	14th	
2001–2002	–	–	–	–	4th	6th
2002–2003	15th	9th	4th	18th	7th	2nd place, silver medalist(s)
2003–2004	13th	3rd place, bronze medalist(s)	3rd place, bronze medalist(s)	–	–	

Season	5000 meter/10000 meter						
1994–1995							
1995–1996	–	1st(b)	5th	8th	7th	3rd place, bronze medalist(s)	7th*
1996–1997	12th	7th	9th	–*	–*	–	3rd place, bronze medalist(s)
1997–1998	19th	1st(b)	–	11th*	–	–	
1998–1999	8th	20th*	4th	1st place, gold medalist(s)	16th		
1999–2000	14th	–*	9th	–	6th		
2000–2001							
2001–2002							
2002–2003	10th	11th	6th	–*	11th	–	
2003–2004							

– = Did not participate
* = 10000 meter
(b) = Division B

== Medals won ==
Championship	Gold (gold)	Silver (silver)	Bronze (bronze)
Dutch Single Distances	0	0	7
Dutch Allround Single Events	8	4	3
Dutch Allround Classification	2	3	1
European Allround Single Events	5	2	3
European Allround Classification	1	1	2
World Allround Single Events	7	5	5
World Allround Classification	2	4	1
Dutch Sprint Single Events	2	3	2
Dutch Sprint Classification	0	0	1
World Single Distances	3	1	0
Olympic Games	1	1	0
World Cup Events	7	4	9
World Cup Classification	1	2	0
World Junior Allround	0	1	0
Total	39	31	34

Awards
Preceded by (Netherlands) Rintje Ritsma	Ard Schenk Award; 1997	Succeeded by (Netherlands) Marianne Timmer
