= J. P. Shilling =

American speed skater

Personal information
- Born: December 20, 1971 (age 54) Baltimore, Maryland, United States

Sport
- Sport: Speed skating

J. P. Shilling (born December 20, 1971) is an American speed skater. He competed in the men's 1500 metres event at the 2002 Winter Olympics.
