= Cindy Overland =

Canadian speed skater

Cindy Overland (born in Toronto, Ontario on February 19, 1976) is a Canadian speed skater who competed for Canada at the 1998 Winter Olympics and at the 2002 Winter Olympics. She had difficulties in both Olympics due to illness and was forced to retire in 2004 due to stress. She had had greater success in other competitions. After retirement she initially focused on education and later coached skating with her father. She is the sister of fellow Olympians Kevin Overland and Amanda Overland.The Overlands' also have another younger brother, Justin Penner. Her ex-husband is Derrick Campbell who was on the team that won Gold in Short track speed skating at the 1998 Winter Olympics – Men's 5000 metre relay.
