= Derek Parra =

American speed skater

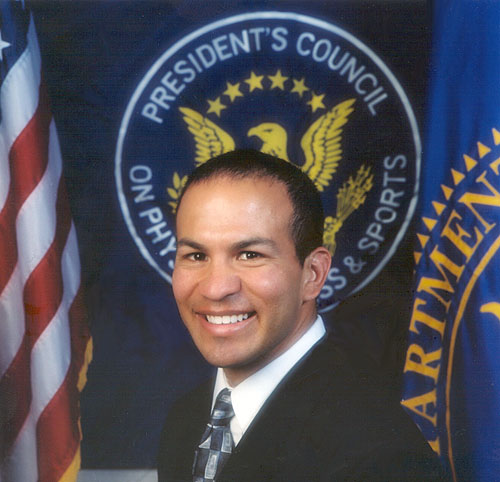

Personal information
- Born: March 15, 1970 (age 56) San Bernardino, California
- Height: 1.62 m (5 ft 4 in)
- Weight: 63 kg (139 lb; 9.9 st)

Sport
- Country: United States
- Sport: Speed skating
Medal record
Men's speed skating
Representing the United States
Olympic Games
Gold medal – first place	2002 Salt Lake City	1500 m
Silver medal – second place	2002 Salt Lake City	5000 m
World Single Distance Championships
Silver medal – second place	2001 Salt Lake City	1500 m
World Allround Championships
Bronze medal – third place	2002 Heerenveen	Overall
U.S. Allrounds
Gold medal – first place	2000	Overall
U.S. Long Track Championships
Gold medal – first place	2004	1500 m

Derek Parra (born March 15, 1970) is an American inline skater and speed skater from San Bernardino, California, who graduated from Eisenhower High School in Rialto, California, in 1988. Parra won two medals at the 2002 Winter Olympics, held in Salt Lake City, Utah.

== Career ==
Parra's most successful season was from 2001 to 2002. At the 2002 Winter Olympics, he took the gold in the 1500 meters, an event in which he had been expected to do well but faced a deep pool of competition. Before that, he won the silver in the 5000 meters being bested by Jochem Uytdehaage of the Netherlands. He has worked part-time in Home Depot's gardening department in West Valley City, Utah. In his book, Reflections in the Ice, Parra recounts pursuing his dream of becoming an inline skater at 17, working at McDonald's in Tampa, Florida, and being so poor he had to eat out of the trash.

Parra was selected to take over as U.S. speed skating national all-around coach for the 2010 Olympics.

He appears in a Restore Our Future television ad endorsing Republican Mitt Romney in the 2012 U.S. presidential election and spoke at the 2012 Republican National Convention. Parra became friends with Romney when he was president of the Salt Lake City Olympic organizing committee.

== Records ==
=== Personal records ===
Personal records
Men's speed skating
Event	Result	Date	Location	Notes
500 m	35.88	December 18, 2001	Utah Olympic Oval, Salt Lake City	
1000 m	1:08.87	January 11, 2003	Utah Olympic Oval, Salt Lake City	
1500 m	1:43.95	February 19, 2002	Utah Olympic Oval, Salt Lake City	World record until beaten by Shani Davis on January 9, 2005.
3000 m	3:46.14	February 3, 2002	Utah Olympic Oval, Salt Lake City	
5000 m	6:17.98	February 9, 2002	Utah Olympic Oval, Salt Lake City	
10000 m	13:33.44	February 22, 2002	Utah Olympic Oval, Salt Lake City	

=== World records ===
Event	Time	Date	Venue
1500 m	1:43.95	February 19, 2002	Utah Olympic Oval, Salt Lake City
Team pursuit	3:49.85	November 8, 2003	Vikingskipet, Hamar
Team pursuit	3:48.56	November 13, 2004	Vikingskipet, Hamar

Source: SpeedSkatingStats.com
