= Jondon Trevena =

American speed skater

Personal information
- Born: July 10, 1972 (age 54) Denver, Colorado, United States

Sport
- Sport: Speed skating

Jondon Trevena (born July 10, 1972) is an American speed skater. He competed in the men's 5000 metres event at the 2002 Winter Olympics.
