= Barbara de Loor =

Dutch speed skater

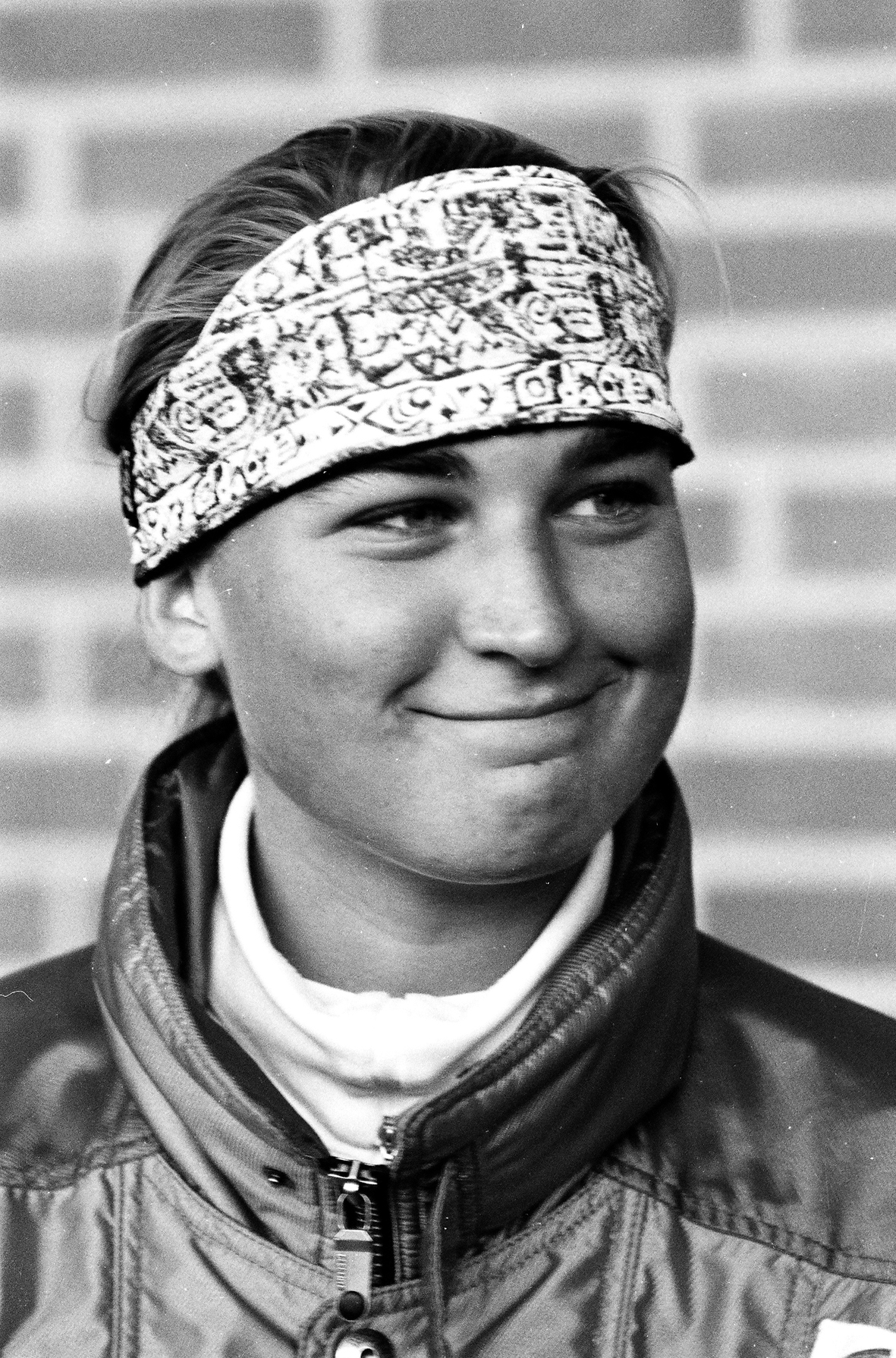

Personal information
- Born: 26 May 1974 (age 52) Leimuiden, Netherlands

Sport
- Country: Netherlands
- Sport: Speed skating
- Turned pro: 1992
- Retired: 2006
Medal record
Women's speed skating
Representing the Netherlands
World Championships
Gold medal – first place	2005 Inzell	1000 m
European Championships
Bronze medal – third place	1997 Heerenveen	Allround

Barbara de Loor (born 26 May 1974) is a Dutch retired speed skater who was specialised in the middle long and longer distances, over 1000 to 5000 meters.

== Biography ==
In her junior years De Loor was 6th and 4th at the World Junior Speed Skating Championships in 1992 and 1993. She participated in the 1994 World Allround Speed Skating Championships for women, but did not qualify for the final 5000m; in 1997, she did and finished 9th overall. She reached two top-10 rankings at the 1997 World Single Distance Speed Skating Championships, participating in three distances (8th in 3000m and 5000m, and 11th in 1500m). This was also the year that she achieved her first international medal: bronze at the 1997 European Speed Skating Championships.

In 1998 she finished sixth at the same European Speed Skating Championships, and qualified for her first Olympics, the 1998 Winter Olympics in Nagano, where she skated the 1500m (finishing 22nd) and surprised many with a fourth place in the 5000m event. The trend was set and in 1999 she was fourth over 3000 meters and fifth over 5000 meters at the World Single Distances Speed Skating Championships for Women. She also finished fifth at the European All-around Championships and sixth at the World All-around Championships. In 2000, she did not achieve that same level, but she returned to the highest level in 2001, reaching a fourth position at the European, and a fifth at the World All-around Championships. She failed to qualify for the 2002 Winter Olympics in Salt Lake City.

De Loor qualified for the 2003 World Single Distance Championships on two distances. She finished 8th in the 5000 meters and 4th in the 1500 meters. A year later at the same distance and the same championship she again finished 4th, and finished 5th at the European All-around Championships. In 2005, she finished 4th at the 1500 during the 2005 World Single Distance Speed Skating Championships, for the third consecutive time. It was also the year of her biggest achievement in her career as she became the World Champion over 1000 meters in the same event, finishing in front of Anni Friesinger and Marianne Timmer to claim the gold.

In December 2005 she missed out on direct qualifying for the 2006 Winter Olympics, finishing behind some other contenders at the 1500 and 1000 meters. For the last distance she was nominated by the Dutch Speed Skating Association due to her world title that year. She was awarded a skate-off with Paulien van Deutekom who finished 4th at the Dutch Single Distance Championship, where the qualifications were held. De Loor won the confrontation and was qualified for her second Olympics. In Turin at the 2006 Winter Olympics she came close to a medal, but this time finished 6th. After the Olympics she appeared at the Speed Skating World Cup meeting in Heerenveen where she finished fifth in the 1500 meters. It was the last race of her career.

=== Post-skating career ===
In 2006 De Loor participated alongside professional dancer Marcus van Teijlingen in the Dutch version of Dancing with the Stars and won the competition. After that she appeared on several other television programs such as De Afvallers and De Afvallers met Sterren, as well as with a program named Nederlanders in Ontwikkeling. Since the summer 2023, she is on Dutch television daily, having taken over for Olga Commandeur in the physical exercise show Nederland in Beweging!

== Personal records ==
- 500 meters, 39.79, 15 January 2005 in Calgary
- 1000 meters, 1:16.03, 10 March 2001 in Salt Lake City
- 1500 meters, 1:55.83, 11 March 2001 in Salt Lake City
- 3000 meters, 4:04.56, 9 March 2001 in Salt Lake City
- 5000 meters, 7:07.49, 10 January 1999 in Heerenveen
