= Tatyana Trapeznikova =

Russian speed skater (born 1973)

Personal information
- Nationality: Russian
- Born: 3 December 1973 (age 51); Ufa, Soviet Union

Sport
- Sport: Speed skating

Tatyana Trapeznikova (born 3 December 1973) is a Russian speed skater. She competed at the 1994, 1998 and the 2002 Winter Olympics.
