= Dave Tamburrino =

American speed skater

Personal information
- Born: September 19, 1972 (age 53) Saratoga Springs, New York, United States

Sport
- Sport: Speed skating

Dave Tamburrino (born September 19, 1972) is an American speed skater. He competed at the 1994 Winter Olympics and the 1998 Winter Olympics.
