= Noriko Munekata =

Japanese speed skater (born 1974)

Personal information
- Nationality: Japanese
- Born: 30 January 1974 (age 51); Shintoku, Hokkaido, Japan

Sport
- Sport: Speed skating

Noriko Munekata (宗像 記子, Munekata Noriko, born 30 January 1974) is a Japanese speed skater. She competed in the women's 3000 metres at the 1998 Winter Olympics.
