= Martin Feigenwinter =

Swiss speed skater (born 1970)

Personal information
- Nationality: Swiss
- Born: 20 March 1970 (age 56) Liestal, Switzerland

Sport
- Sport: Speed skating

Martin Feigenwinter (born 20 March 1970) is a Swiss speed skater. He competed at the 1994 Winter Olympics and the 1998 Winter Olympics.
