= Dmitry Shepel =

Russian speed skater

Personal information
- Born: 8 August 1977 (age 48) Leningrad

Sport
- Country: Russia
- Sport: Men's speed skating
Medal record
Representing Russia
Men's speed skating
World Championships
Silver medal – second place	2002 Heerenveen	Allround
European Championships
Gold medal – first place	2001 Baselga di Pinè	Allround
Bronze medal – third place	1999 Heerenveen	Allround
Bronze medal – third place	2002 Baselga di Pinè	Allround

Dmitry Sergeyevich Shepel (Russian: Дмитрий Сергеевич Шепель); born 8 August 1977) is a retired Russian speedskater.

He became the World Junior Champion in 1998 in Roseville, Minnesota. The same year he set a junior world record on the 1,500 meters, skating that distance in 1:50,45 in Calgary. Shepel had his major success in 2001, when on the high-altitude ice rink of Baselga di Pinè in Italy he became European champion, breaking the hegemony of skaters from the Netherlands who otherwise won every event from 1992 to 2005. He participated at the Olympic Winter Games in 1998, 2002 and 2006. His most successful efforts were in 2002 in Salt Lake City, with a 4th place at the 5,000 meters and a 6th place at the 10,000 meters. After this last distance on March 22, 2002, Shepel reached third place in the adelskalender, a ranking based on skaters' all-time personal records for the classic samalog distances, which position he held until January 2005.

== Personal records ==
Personal records
Men's speed skating
Event	Result	Date	Location	Notes
500 m	36.13	26 January 2002	Calgary	
1000 m	1:13.31	15 February 1998	Nagano	
1500 m	1:45.98	19 February 2002	Salt Lake City	
3000 m	3:47.36	12 February 2005	Calgary	
5000 m	6:21.85	9 February 2002	Salt Lake City	
10000 m	13:23.83	22 February 2002	Salt Lake City	

Source: sskating.com
