= Dustin Molicki =

Canadian speed skater

Personal information
- Born: 13 August 1975 (age 49); Calgary, Alberta, Canada

Sport
- Sport: Speed skating

Dustin Molicki (born 13 August 1975) is a Canadian speed skater. He competed in three events at the 2002 Winter Olympics.
