= Cédric Kuentz =

French speed skater (born 1973)

Personal information
- Nationality: French
- Born: 15 November 1973 (age 51); Chamonix, France

Sport
- Sport: Speed skating

Cédric Kuentz (born 15 November 1973) is a French former speed skater. He competed at the 1998 Winter Olympics and the 2002 Winter Olympics.
