= 2007 in speed skating =

The year 2007 in speed skating also includes events in the autumn of 2006, since they belong to the same long track speed skating season.

== Chronology ==
- 3 November: On the starting day of the Dutch Single Distance Championships, Gianni Romme confirms that he quits as active speed skater to take over as coach of Anni Friesinger.
- 17 December: After the Norwegian Championships at Geithus, Norwegian allround champion Mari Hemmer is not selected for the European Championship, as the Norwegian Speed Skating Federation decides they will not use their allotted quota of three skaters. After two days, the decision is changed, and Hemmer, along with Hedvig Bjelkevik (who later declined the place) were selected.
- 25 December: Sprinter Erben Wennemars wins bronze at his first start at the Dutch Allround Championships after lowering his personal best on the 10000 m by nearly 20 seconds. Sven Kramer won the championship.
- 28 December: Five-time medallist at the Turin Olympics, Cindy Klassen, begins the season by winning two gold medals and three silver medals at the Canadian Single Distance Championships.
- 30 December: Anni Friesinger wins four of four distances at the German Allround Championships, but declines a spot at the European Championship. The five-time European Champion will take part at the World Sprint Championship, which she is yet to win, instead.
- 9–11 March: Martina Sáblíková wins two gold medals at the 2007 World Single Distance Speed Skating Championships in Salt Lake City on 3000 m and 5000 m tracks and sets a new 5000 m world record for 6:45.61.

== International championships ==
- European: Ritten Artificial Ice Track, Collalbo, Italy, 12 - 14 January
- World Sprint: Vikingskipet, Hamar, Norway, 20 and 21 January
- World Allround: Thialf, Heerenveen, Netherlands, 9–11 February
- World Junior: Olympia Eisstadion, Innsbruck, Austria: 23–25 February
- World Single Distance: Utah Olympic Oval, Salt Lake City, United States, 8–11 March

== Other international competitions ==
- 2007 Speed Skating World Cup

Thialf, Heerenveen, Netherlands: 10–12 November
Distance	Men	Women
500 m (1)	(Japan) Keiichiro Nagashima 35.10	(South Korea) Lee Sang-hwa 38.23
500 m (2)	(Japan) Keiichiro Nagashima 35.24	(China) Wang Beixing 38.26
1000 m (1)	(South Korea) Lee Kyou-hyuk 1:09.01	(Germany) Anni Friesinger 1:15.89
1000 m (2)	(United States) Shani Davis 1:09.17	(Germany) Anni Friesinger 1:15.93
1500 m	(Netherlands) Erben Wennemars 1:45.96	(Germany) Anni Friesinger 1:56.90
3000 m	n/a	(Netherlands) Renate Groenewold 4:05.45
5000 m	(Netherlands) Sven Kramer 6:16.64	n/a
Sportforum Hohenschönhausen, Berlin, Germany: 17–19 November
Distance	Men	Women
500 m (1)	(South Korea) Lee Kyou-hyuk 35.08	(Germany) Jenny Wolf 37.77
500 m (2)	(Finland) Pekka Koskela 35.02	(Germany) Jenny Wolf 38.12
1000 m	(Netherlands) Erben Wennemars 1:08.88	(Germany) Anni Friesinger 1:15.53
1500 m	(Italy) Enrico Fabris 1:45.54	(Germany) Anni Friesinger 1:55.54
3000 m	n/a	(Netherlands) Renate Groenewold 4:02.44
5000 m	(Netherlands) Sven Kramer 6:09.76	n/a
Team pursuit	Netherlands 3:40.79	Netherlands 3:02.90
Krylatskoe Ice Hall, Moscow, Russia: 25–26 November
Distance	Men	Women
1500 m	(Netherlands) Erben Wennemars 1:46.85	(Germany) Anni Friesinger 1:56.40
5000 m	n/a	(Germany) Claudia Pechstein 7:04.90
10000 m	(Italy) Enrico Fabris 13:14.94	n/a
Heilongjiang Indoor Rink, Harbin, China: 2–3 December
Distance	Men	Women
100 m	(Japan) Yūya Oikawa 9.58	(China) Xing Aihua 10.31
500 m (1)	(Finland) Pekka Koskela 34.98	(South Korea) Lee Sang-hwa 38.23
500 m (2)	(Japan) Keiichiro Nagashima 35.06 (South Korea) Lee Kyou-hyuk 35.06	(Germany) Jenny Wolf 38.41
1000 m (1)	(South Korea) Lee Kyou-hyuk 1:09.39	(Italy) Chiara Simionato 1:16.99
1000 m (2)	(South Korea) Lee Kyou-hyuk 1:09.17	(Italy) Chiara Simionato 1:17.14
M-Wave, Nagano, Japan: 9–10 December
Distance	Men	Women
100 m	(Japan) Yūya Oikawa 9.62	(Germany) Judith Hesse 10.51
500 m (1)	(Japan) Keiichiro Nagashima 34.91	(South Korea) Lee Sang-hwa 38.52
500 m (2)	(South Korea) Lee Kang-seok 35.09	(South Korea) Lee Sang-hwa 38.30
1000 m (1)	(Finland) Pekka Koskela 1:09.41	(Canada) Shannon Rempel 1:16.88
1000 m (2)	(Netherlands) Jan Bos 1:09.40	(Italy) Chiara Simionato 1:17.14
Thialf, Heerenveen, Netherlands: 27–28 January
Distance	Men	Women
Oval Lingotto, Turin, Italy: 3–4 February
Distance	Men	Women
Gunda Niemann-Stirnemann Halle, Erfurt, Germany: 17–18 February
Distance	Men	Women
World Cup Final: Olympic Oval, Calgary, Alberta, Canada: 2–4 March
Distance	Men	Women

- 2007 Winter Asian Games, Changchun, China: 28 January – 4 February
- 2007 Winter Universiade, Oval Lingotto, Turin, Italy: 17–27 January
- American/Oceanian Regional Qualifier for World Allround Championships, Pettit National Ice Center, Milwaukee: 13 January and 14 February

== National championships ==
Championships need to have at least three participants to be mentioned here. Top three are mentioned for allround and sprint championships if the nation has at least three spots in the relevant international championship, otherwise only the winner is mentioned. If the championship had fewer than three participants, it is not mentioned.

Country	Men's Allround	Men's Sprint	Men's Single Distance	Women's Allround	Women's Sprint	Women's Single Distance
Austria	(gold) Christian Pichler	(gold) Christian Falger	Christian Falger: 2 × 500 m, 1000 m, 1500 m Stephan Bittner: 5000 m	(gold) Martina Windhager	(gold) Anna Rokita	Anna Rokita: 2 × 500 m, 1000 m, 3000 m, 5000 m
Canada			Denny Morrison: 2 × 500 m, 1000 m, 1500 m Arne Dankers: 5000 m, 10000 m			Shannon Rempel: 2 × 500 m Cindy Klassen: 1000 m, 1500 m Clara Hughes: 3000 m, 5000 m
China	(gold) Jin Xin	(gold) Zhang Zhongqi	An Weijiang: 100 m, 2 ×500 m Chang Rui: 1000 m Yue Cheng: 1500 m Song Xingyu: 5000 m, 10 000 m	(gold) Ji Jia	(gold) Shuang Zhang; (silver) Wang Dan; (bronze) Yu Jing	Xing Aihua: 100 m, 2 ×500 m Wang Fei: 1000 m, 1500 m, 3000 m Fu Chunyan: 5000 m
Finland	(gold) Jarmo Valtonen	(gold) Mika Poutala; (silver) Tuomas Nieminen; (bronze) Niko Räsänen	Pekka Koskela: 2 × 500 m	(gold) Pia Humisto	(gold) Susanna Potka	Susanna Potka: 2 × 500 m
Germany	(gold) Tobias Schneider	(gold) Samuel Schwarz	Denny Ihle: 100 m Anton Hahn: 2 × 500 m Samuel Schwarz: 1000 m, 1500 m Tobias Schneider: 5000 m Marco Weber: 10000 m	(gold) Anni Friesinger; (silver) Claudia Pechstein; (bronze) Daniela Anschütz-Thoms	(gold) Jenny Wolf; (silver) Pamela Zoellner; (bronze) Monique Angermüller	Jenny Wolf: 100 m Anni Friesinger: 500 m, 1000 m, 1500 m Stephanie Beckert: 3000 m, 5000 m
Italy	(gold) Enrico Fabris; (silver) Matteo Anesi; (bronze) Luca Stefani	(gold) Ermanno Ioriatti		(gold) Chiara Simionato		
Japan	(gold) Hiroki Hirako	(gold) Keiichiro Nagashima; (silver) Hiroyasu Shimizu; (bronze) Takaharu Nakajima	Keiichiro Nagashima: 2 × 500 m, 1000 m Teruhiro Sugimori: 1500 m Naoki Yasuda: 3000 m Hiroki Hirako: 5000 m	(gold) Maki Tabata; (silver) Masako Hozumi; (bronze) Eriko Ishino	(gold) Tomomi Okazaki; (silver) Shihomi Shinya; (bronze) Maki Tabata	Sayuri Osuga: 2 × 500 m Nao Kodaira: 1000 m Maki Tabata: 1500 m Hiromi Otsu: 3000 m
South Korea	(gold) Choi Kwun-won	(gold) Lee Kyou-hyuk; (silver) Mun Jun; (bronze) Choi Jae-bong	Lee Kang-seok: 2 × 500 m Lee Kyou-hyuk: 1000 m Choi Kwun-won: 5000 m Lee Jong-wu: 1500 m shared Mun Jun: 1500 m shared Kim Myung-seok: 10 000 m	(gold) Noh Seon-yeong	(gold) Kim Yu-Rim; (silver) Choi Seung-yong; (bronze) Lee Bo-ra	Lee Sang-hwa: 2 × 500 m Kim Yu-Rim: 1000 m Lee Ju-yun: 1500 m, 3000 m Lee So-yeon: 5000 m
Netherlands	Article; (gold) Sven Kramer; (silver) Carl Verheijen; (bronze) Erben Wennemars	(gold) Erben Wennemars; (silver) Jan Bos; (bronze) Beorn Nijenhuis	Article; Jan Bos: 2 × 500 m, 1000 m Sven Kramer: 1500 m, 5000 m, 10 000 m	Article; (gold) Ireen Wüst; (silver) Renate Groenewold; (bronze) Marja Vis	(gold) Marianne Timmer; (silver) Annette Gerritsen; (bronze) Margot Boer	Article; Margot Boer: 2 × 500 m Ireen Wüst: 1000 m, 1500 m Renate Groenewold: 3000 m Gretha Smit: 5000 m
Norway	(gold) Eskil Ervik; (silver) Henrik Christiansen; (bronze) Sverre Haugli	(gold) Dag Erik Kleven; (silver) Eirik Lunde Pedersen; (bronze) Frode Bartholdsen	Even Wetten: 2 × 500 m, 1000 m Eskil Ervik: 1500 m, 5000 m Øystein Grødum: 10 000 m (awarded at allround championship)	(gold) Mari Hemmer; (silver) Hedvig Bjelkevik; (bronze) Annette Bjelkevik	(gold) Hedvig Bjelkevik	Hedvig Bjelkevik: 2 × 500 m, 1000 m Maren Haugli: 1500 m, 3000 m
Poland	(gold) Konrad Niedźwiedzki; (silver) Sławomir Chmura; (bronze) Witold Mazur	(gold) Maciej Ustynowicz	Maciej Ustynowicz 2 × 500 m Konrad Niedźwiedzki 1000 m, 1500 m Witold Mazur 5000 m Sławomir Chmura: 10 000 m	(gold) Katarzyna Wójcicka	(gold) Karolina Ksyt	Katarzyna Wójcicka: 2 × 500 m, 1500 m, 3000 m Luiza Złotkowska: 1000 m, 5000 m

Sweden

- Swedish Championships: Östermalms IP, Stockholm, 15–17 December
  - Allround, 15 and 16 December

Medal	Men	Women
1st place, gold medalist(s)	Johan Röjler 163.853 (38.9–7:05.78 / 1:56.98–14:27.8)	Marita Johansson 185.309 (43.8–4:46.54 / 2:12.85–8:14.7)

  - Sprint, 16 and 17 December

Medal	Men	Women
1st place, gold medalist(s)	Joel Eriksson 151.270 (37.96–1:15.72 / 37.85–1:15.20)	Paulina Wallin 171.140 (41.3–1:28.25 / 41.87–1:27.63)

  - Team pursuit, 17 December

Medal	Men	Women
1st place, gold medalist(s)	Sandvikens SK (Mattias Falk, Sebastian Falk, Rasmus Falk) 4:28.8	Hagaström 1 (Anna Hånell, Emma Wallgren, Madeleine Wengberg) 4:05.7

Switzerland

- Allround: Olympia Eisstadion, Innsbruck, Austria, 16 and 17 December

Medal	Men	Women
1st place, gold medalist(s)	Martin Hänggi 172.172 (40.12–7:21.58 / 2:02.82–15:39.09)	Sandra Kehrli 196.365 (48.28–5:02.26 / 2:24.19–8:16.45)

United States

- Single Distance (Fall World Cup Qualifier): Pettit National Ice Center, Milwaukee, Wisconsin, 19–22 October

Distance	Men	Women
2 × 500 m	Tucker Fredricks 71.640	Elli Ochowicz 80.680
1000 m	Kip Carpenter 1:11.23	Elli Ochowicz 1:21.14
1500 m	Mike Blumel 1:51.99	Catherine Raney 2:03.71
3000 m	n/a	Maria Lamb 4:22.19
5000 m	Chad Hedrick 6:43.08	n/a

- USA Championships: Pettit National Ice Center, Milwaukee, Wisconsin, 19–23 December
  - Allround, 19 and 20 December

Medal	Men	Women
1st place, gold medalist(s)	Shani Davis 151.740 (36.52–6:24.93 / 1:47.12–13:40.41)	Catherine Raney 169.588 (41.82–4:14.46 / 2:04.07–7:20.02)
2nd place, silver medalist(s)	Chad Hedrick 153.684 (37.60–6:25.47 / 1:49.88–13:38.22)	Anna Ringsred 171.748 (41.67–4:19.34 / 2:04.63–7:32.29)
3rd place, bronze medalist(s)	Charles Leveille 159.993 (39.09–6:46.51 / 1:52.82–14:12.12)	Maria Lamb 172.795 (41.12–4:22.06 / 2:06.07–7:39.76)
