= Speed skating at the 2006 Winter Olympics – Women's 1500 metres =

Women's 1500 metres at the XX Olympic Winter Games
- Venue: Oval Lingotto
- Dates: 22 February 2006
- Competitors: 35 from 13 nations
- Winning time: 1:55.27

Medalists
1st place, gold medalist(s)		Cindy Klassen; Canada
2nd place, silver medalist(s)		Kristina Groves; Canada
3rd place, bronze medalist(s)		Ireen Wüst; Netherlands

The women's 1500 metres speed skating competition for the 2006 Winter Olympics was held in Turin, Italy, on 22 February.

== Records ==
Prior to this competition, the existing world and Olympic records were as follows.

World record	Cindy Klassen (CAN)	1:51.79	Salt Lake City, United States	20 November 2005
Olympic record	Anni Friesinger (GER)	1:54.02	Salt Lake City, United States	20 February 2002

No new world or Olympic records were set during the competition.

== Results ==
Rank	Pair	Lane	Name	Country	Time	Time behind	Notes
Gold medal	17	O	Cindy Klassen	Canada	1:55.27		
Silver medal	15	O	Kristina Groves	Canada	1:56.74	+1.47	
Bronze medal	18	I	Ireen Wüst	Netherlands	1:56.90	+1.63	
4	17	I	Anni Friesinger	Germany	1:57.31	+2.04	
5	12	I	Chiara Simionato	Italy	1:58.76	+3.49	
6	11	O	Yekaterina Lobysheva	Russia	1:58.87	+3.60	
7	16	O	Christine Nesbitt	Canada	1:59.15	+3.88	
8	16	I	Jennifer Rodriguez	United States	1:59.30	+4.03	
9	15	I	Renate Groenewold	Netherlands	1:59.33	+4.06	
10	13	I	Daniela Anschütz-Thoms	Germany	1:59.74	+4.47	
11	9	O	Katarzyna Wójcicka	Poland	1:59.96	+4.69	
12	13	O	Wang Fei	China	2:00.13	+4.86	
13	14	O	Paulien van Deutekom	Netherlands	2:00.15	+4.88	
14	5	O	Marianne Timmer	Netherlands	2:00.45	+5.18	
15	18	O	Maki Tabata	Japan	2:00.77	+5.50	
16	5	I	Lee Ju-yeon	South Korea	2:00.85	+5.58	
17	10	O	Annette Bjelkevik	Norway	2:01.03	+5.76	
18	10	I	Catherine Raney	United States	2:01.17	+5.90	
19	8	O	Maren Haugli	Norway	2:01.22	+5.95	
20	14	I	Varvara Barysheva	Russia	2:01.60	+6.33	
21	3	I	Yekaterina Abramova	Russia	2:01.63	+6.36	
22	9	I	Eriko Ishino	Japan	2:01.85	+6.58	
22	12	O	Ji Jia	China	2:01.85	+6.58	
24	3	O	Maria Lamb	United States	2:02.12	+6.85	
25	7	I	Valentina Yakshina	Russia	2:02.15	+6.88	
26	8	I	Hedvig Bjelkevik	Norway	2:02.16	+6.89	
27	6	I	Anna Rokita	Austria	2:02.19	+6.92	
28	4	I	Shannon Rempel	Canada	2:02.24	+6.97	
29	2	O	Nami Nemoto	Japan	2:02.34	+7.07	
30	7	O	Lucille Opitz	Germany	2:02.75	+7.48	
31	6	O	Adelia Marra	Italy	2:03.07	+7.80	
32	4	O	Noh Seon-yeong	South Korea	2:03.35	+8.08	
33	11	I	Hiromi Otsu	Japan	2:04.77	+9.50	
34	2	I	Zhang Xiaolei	China	2:05.75	+10.48	
35	1	I	Daniela Oltean	Romania	2:09.24	+13.97	
