= Speed skating at the 2006 Winter Olympics – Women's 3000 metres =

Women's 3000 metres at the XX Olympic Winter Games
- Pictogram for speed skating
- Venue: Oval Lingotto
- Dates: 12 February 2006
- Competitors: 28 from 15 nations
- Winning time: 4:02.43

Medalists
1st place, gold medalist(s)		Ireen Wüst; Netherlands
2nd place, silver medalist(s)		Renate Groenewold; Netherlands
3rd place, bronze medalist(s)		Cindy Klassen; Canada

The women's 3000 m speed skating competition at the 2006 Winter Olympics in Turin, Italy, was held on 12 February, the second day of competition at the Olympics.

== Records ==
Prior to this competition, the existing world and Olympic records were as follows.

World record	Cindy Klassen (CAN)	3:55.75	Calgary, Canada	12 November 2005
Olympic record	Claudia Pechstein (GER)	3:57.70	Salt Lake City, United States	20 February 2002

No new world or Olympic records were set during this competition.

== Results ==
Rank	Pair	Lane	Name	Country	Time	Time behind	Notes
Gold medal	10	O	Ireen Wüst	Netherlands	4:02.43		
Silver medal	12	I	Renate Groenewold	Netherlands	4:03.48	+1.05	
Bronze medal	12	O	Cindy Klassen	Canada	4:04.37	+1.94	
4	13	I	Anni Friesinger	Germany	4:04.59	+2.16	
5	11	O	Claudia Pechstein	Germany	4:05.54	+3.11	
6	11	I	Daniela Anschütz-Thoms	Germany	4:06.89	+4.46	
7	14	O	Martina Sáblíková	Czech Republic	4:08.42	+5.99	
8	13	O	Kristina Groves	Canada	4:09.03	+6.60	
9	14	I	Clara Hughes	Canada	4:09.17	+6.74	
10	6	I	Katarzyna Wójcicka	Poland	4:09.61	+7.18	
11	9	I	Catherine Raney	United States	4:10.44	+8.01	
12	9	O	Wang Fei	China	4:10.55	+8.12	
13	3	I	Eriko Ishino	Japan	4:11.21	+8.78	
14	7	I	Maki Tabata	Japan	4:12.38	+9.95	
15	8	O	Maren Haugli	Norway	4:12.50	+10.07	
16	10	I	Anna Rokita	Austria	4:12.87	+10.44	
17	3	O	Moniek Kleinsman	Netherlands	4:13.81	+11.38	
18	7	O	Svetlana Vysokova	Russia	4:13.94	+11.51	
19	2	O	Noh Seon-yeong	South Korea	4:15.68	+13.25	
20	4	I	Adelia Marra	Italy	4:16.27	+13.84	
20	5	I	Eriko Seo	Japan	4:16.27	+13.84	
22	8	I	Margaret Crowley	United States	4:17.37	+14.94	
23	6	O	Annette Bjelkevik	Norway	4:17.57	+15.14	
24	1	O	Valentina Yakshina	Russia	4:19.43	+17.00	
25	5	O	Ji Jia	China	4:21.06	+18.63	
26	2	I	Daniela Oltean	Romania	4:23.34	+20.91	
27	4	O	Kristine Holzer	United States	4:26.60	+24.17	
28	1	I	Nataliya Rybakova	Kazakhstan	4:38.76	+36.33	

=== Lap times ===
Lap times in brackets

1. Ireen Wüst, Netherlands, (19.52 – 30.29 – 30.86 – 31.43 – 31.39 – 32.12 – 32.75 – 34.07) 4:02.43
2. Renate Groenewold, Netherlands, (19.64 – 30.27 – 30.92 – 31.54 – 31.39 – 32.17 – 33.29 – 34.26) 4:03.48 (+1.05)
3. Cindy Klassen, Canada, (19.19 – 30.02 – 31.12 – 31.54 – 31.71 – 32.07 – 33.18 – 35.54) 4:04.37 (+1.94)
4. Anni Friesinger, Germany, (19.47 – 31.26 – 31.27 – 31.63 – 32.05 – 32.12 – 32.87 – 33.92) 4:04.59 (+2.16)
5. Claudia Pechstein, Germany, (19.53 – 30.68 – 31.47 – 31.87 – 32.29 – 32.80 – 33.02 – 33.88) 4:05.54 (+3.11)
6. Daniela Anschütz-Thoms, Germany, (19.68 – 31.35 – 31.77 – 32.23 – 32.30 – 32.65 – 33.26 – 33.65) 4:06.89 (+4.46)
7. Martina Sáblíková, Czech Republic, (20.51 – 31.96 – 32.44 – 32.33 – 32.29 – 32.76 – 33.23 – 32.90) 4:08.42 (+5.99)
8. Kristina Groves, Canada, (20.15 – 31.05 – 31.72 – 31.95 – 32.59 – 32.81 – 33.78 – 34.98) 4:09.03 (+6.60)
9. Clara Hughes, Canada, (21.05 – 32.41 – 32.46 – 32.48 – 32.86 – 32.72 – 32.66 – 32.53) 4:09.17 (+6.74)
10. Katarzyna Wójcicka, Poland, (20.27 – 32.18 – 32.58 – 32.80 – 32.52 – 33.05 – 33.25 – 32.96) 4:09.61 (+7.18)
11. Catherine Raney, United States, (20.39 – 31.96 – 32.18 – 32.47 – 32.48 – 32.80 – 33.53 – 34.63) 4:10.44 (+8.01)
12. Wang Fei, China, (20.13 – 31.95 – 32.20 – 32.38 – 33.13 – 33.14 – 33.71 – 33.91) 4:10.55 (+8.12)
13. Eriko Ishino, Japan, (19.92 – 30.89 – 31.54 – 32.36 – 33.15 – 33.90 – 34.38 – 35.07) 4:11.21 (+8.78)
14. Maki Tabata, Japan, (19.94 – 31.38 – 31.99 – 32.60 – 33.21 – 33.84 – 34.44 – 34.98) 4:12.38 (+9.95)
15. Maren Haugli, Norway, (20.60 – 32.49 – 32.59 – 32.62 – 32.97 – 33.22 – 33.65 – 34.36) 4:12.50 (+10.07)
16. Anna Rokita, Austria, (20.27 – 31.55 – 32.24 – 32.85 – 33.28 – 33.61 – 34.12 – 34.95) 4:12.87 (+10.44)
17. Moniek Kleinsman, Netherlands, (20.01 – 30.83 – 31.56 – 32.32 – 33.39 – 33.86 – 35.30 – 36.54) 4:13.81 (+11.38)
18. Svetlana Vysokova, Russia, (20.56 – 32.58 – 33.35 – 33.26 – 33.32 – 33.35 – 33.51 – 34.01) 4:13.94 (+11.51)
19. Noh Seon-yeong, Korea, (20.86 – 31.74 – 32.82 – 33.32 – 33.52 – 33.89 – 34.53 – 35.00) 4:15.68 (+13.25)
20. Adelia Marra, Italy, (20.34 – 32.36 – 32.68 – 33.21 – 33.67 – 34.10 – 34.61 – 35.30) 4:16.27 (+13.84)
21. Eriko Seo, Japan, (20.54 – 32.14 – 32.73 – 33.10 – 33.66 – 34.11 – 34.97 – 35.02) 4:16.27 (+13.84)
22. Margaret Crowley, United States, (20.80 – 32.67 – 32.90 – 33.57 – 33.69 – 33.92 – 34.68 – 35.14) 4:17.37 (+14.94)
23. Annette Bjelkevik, Norway, (20.48 – 32.07 – 32.89 – 32.58 – 33.63 – 34.41 – 35.22 – 36.29) 4:17.57 (+15.14)
24. Valentina Yakshina, Russia, (20.70 – 33.10 – 33.19 – 32.99 – 33.66 – 34.61 – 35.14 – 36.04) 4:19.43 (+17.00)
25. Ji Jia, China, (20.80 – 32.46 – 33.42 – 33.67 – 34.13 – 34.94 – 35.58 – 36.06) 4:21.06 (+18.63)
26. Daniela Oltean, Romania, (20.62 – 32.97 – 33.30 – 34.21 – 34.80 – 35.26 – 35.82 – 36.36) 4:23.34 (+20.91)
27. Kristine Holzer, United States, (21.56 – 33.21 – 33.60 – 34.54 – 35.07 – 35.73 – 36.25 – 36.64) 4:26.60 (+24.17)
28. Nataliya Rybakova, Kazakhstan, (21.62 – 33.55 – 34.82 – 36.38 – 37.37 – 38.14 – 38.28 – 38.60) 4:38.76 (+36.33)

=== Pair order ===
Skater in inner lane on first lap listed first

1. Natalya Rybakova, KAZ – Valentina Yakshina, RUS
2. Daniela Oltean, ROM – Noh Seon-yeong, KOR
3. Eriko Ishino, JPN – Moniek Kleinsman, NED
4. Adelia Marra, ITA – Kristine Holzer, USA
5. Eriko Seo, JPN – Jia Ji, CHN
6. Katarzyna Wójcicka, POL – Annette Bjelkevik, NOR
7. Maki Tabata, JPN – Svetlana Vysokova, RUS
8. Margaret Crowley, USA – Maren Haugli, NOR
9. Catherine Raney, USA – Wang Fei, CHN
10. Anna Rokita, AUT – Ireen Wüst, NED
11. Daniela Anschütz-Thoms, GER – Claudia Pechstein, GER
12. Renate Groenewold, NED – Cindy Klassen, CAN
13. Anni Friesinger, GER – Kristina Groves, CAN
14. Clara Hughes, CAN – Martina Sáblíková, CZE
