= Speed skating at the 2006 Winter Olympics – Women's team pursuit =

Women's team pursuit at the XX Olympic Winter Games
- Pictogram for speed skating
- Venue: Oval Lingotto
- Dates: 15–16 February 2006
- Competitors: 35 from 8 nations
- Winning time: 3:01.25

Medalists
1st place, gold medalist(s)		Germany; Daniela Anschütz-Thoms, Anni Friesinger, Lucille Opitz, Claudia Pechstein, Sabine Völker
2nd place, silver medalist(s)		Canada; Kristina Groves, Clara Hughes, Cindy Klassen, Christine Nesbitt, Shannon Rempel
3rd place, bronze medalist(s)		Russia; Yekaterina Abramova, Varvara Barysheva, Galina Likhachova, Yekaterina Lobysheva, Svetlana Vysokova

The women's team pursuit competition at the 2006 Winter Olympics in Turin, Italy, began on 15 February at Oval Lingotto. The team pursuit consisted of a qualifying round, then a series of elimination races, with the winners of the elimination races progressing to the next round of the 'knockout phase'.

Each race was skated by two teams of three skaters, over a distance of six 400-metre laps (2400 metres total). The three skaters of a team were allowed to change order at any time, but the team's final time was always recorded when the third skater crossed the finishing line. If two teams started simultaneously on opposite sides of the track, and if one team managed to overtake the other before the full distance, the overtaking team was immediately declared the winner.

== Records ==
Prior to this competition, the existing world and Olympic records were as follows.

World record	GER	2:56.04	Calgary, Canada	13 November 2005
Olympic record	None (debut sport)	None		

The following new world and Olympic records were set during this competition.

Date	Event	Team	Time	OR	WR
15 February	Heat 1	Norway; Annette Bjelkevik; Hedvig Bjelkevik; Maren Haugli	3:06.34	OR	
15 February	Heat 3	Russia; Yekaterina Abramova; Galina Likhachova; Yekaterina Lobysheva	3:05.93	OR	
15 February	Quarterfinals	Canada; Kristina Groves; Cindy Klassen; Christine Nesbitt	3:01.24	OR	

== Results ==
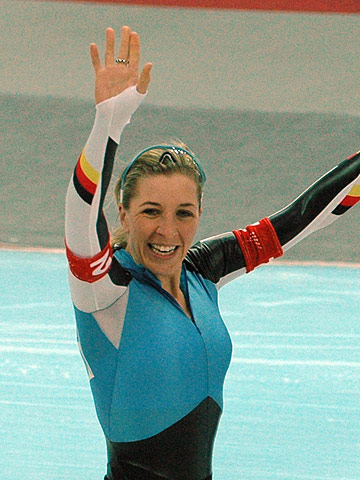
Anni Friesinger after winning the gold medal

Teams had to select three skaters for each round of the team pursuit, but all skaters who participated in at least one round earned a medal, and are mentioned in the overall results below.

Rank	Team
1	Germany; Daniela Anschütz-Thoms; Anni Friesinger; Lucille Opitz; Claudia Pechstein; Sabine Völker
1	Canada; Kristina Groves; Clara Hughes; Cindy Klassen; Christine Nesbitt; Shannon Rempel
1	Russia; Yekaterina Abramova; Varvara Barysheva; Galina Likhachova; Yekaterina Lobysheva; Svetlana Vysokova
4	Japan; Eriko Ishino; Nami Nemoto; Hiromi Otsu; Maki Tabata
5	United States; Margaret Crowley; Maria Lamb; Catherine Raney; Jennifer Rodriguez; Amy Sannes
6	Netherlands; Renate Groenewold; Moniek Kleinsman; Gretha Smit; Paulien van Deutekom; Ireen Wüst
7	Norway; Annette Bjelkevik; Hedvig Bjelkevik; Maren Haugli
8	China; Ji Jia; Wang Fei; Zhang Xiaolei

=== Heats ===
Rank	Team	Time	Notes
1	Russia; Yekaterina Abramova; Varvara Barysheva; Svetlana Vysokova	3:03.19	OR
2	Norway; Annette Bjelkevik; Hedvig Bjelkevik; Maren Haugli	3:06.34	
3	Canada; Kristina Groves; Clara Hughes; Shannon Rempel	3:06.45	
4	Netherlands; Renate Groenewold; Moniek Kleinsman; Gretha Smit	3:06.67	
5	Germany; Daniela Anschütz-Thoms; Lucille Opitz; Sabine Völker	3:07.07	
6	United States; Margaret Crowley; Maria Lamb; Amy Sannes	3:07.83	
7	Japan; Nami Nemoto; Hiromi Otsu; Maki Tabata	3:08.34	
8	China; Ji Jia; Wang Fei; Zhang Xiaolei	3:18.24	

1: The team from Norway briefly held the Olympic record time. The Norwegians set the record with the fastest time of the first heat, before Russia posted the fastest time in the final heat

=== Knockout round ===
==== Quarterfinals ====
Seed	Team	Time	Notes
1	Russia; Yekaterina Abramova; Galina Likhachova; Yekaterina Lobysheva	3:05.93	Q
8	China; Ji Jia; Wang Fei; Zhang Xiaolei	3:08.29	

Seed	Team	Time	Notes
4	Netherlands; Renate Groenewold; Paulien van Deutekom; Ireen Wüst	3:03.65	
5	Germany; Daniela Anschütz-Thoms; Anni Friesinger; Claudia Pechstein	3:01.52	Q

Seed	Team	Time	Notes
2	Norway; Annette Bjelkevik; Hedvig Bjelkevik; Maren Haugli	Overtaken	
7	Japan; Eriko Ishino; Hiromi Otsu; Maki Tabata	Overtook	Q

Seed	Team	Time	Notes
3	Canada; Kristina Groves; Cindy Klassen; Christine Nesbitt	3:01.24	Q OR
6	United States; Maria Lamb; Catherine Raney; Jennifer Rodriguez	3:04.59	

==== Semifinals ====
Seed	Team	Time	Notes
1	Russia; Varvara Barysheva; Galina Likhachova; Svetlana Vysokova	3:07.42	
5	Germany; Daniela Anschütz-Thoms; Anni Friesinger; Claudia Pechstein	3:02.72	Q

Seed	Team	Time	Notes
3	Canada; Kristina Groves; Clara Hughes; Cindy Klassen	3:02.13	Q
7	Japan; Eriko Ishino; Nami Nemoto; Maki Tabata	3:05.95	

==== Finals ====
Four finals determined the final finishing order, with the two semifinal winners meeting for gold, and the two semifinal losers racing for bronze. To determine places five-through-eight, the four quarterfinal losers were ranked by their time in the quarterfinal race, with the fastest loser matched up against the second-fastest for fifth, and the two slowest for seventh.

Final A (gold medal)

Seed	Team	Time	Notes
3	Canada; Kristina Groves; Clara Hughes; Christine Nesbitt	3:02.91	Silver medal
2	Germany; Daniela Anschütz-Thoms; Anni Friesinger; Claudia Pechstein	3:01.25	Gold medal

Final B (bronze medal)

Seed	Team	Time	Notes
1	Russia; Yekaterina Abramova; Yekaterina Lobysheva; Svetlana Vysokova	Overtook	Bronze medal
7	Japan; Eriko Ishino; Nami Nemoto; Maki Tabata	Overtaken	

Final C (5th place)

Seed	Team	Time	Notes
4	Netherlands; Gretha Smit; Paulien van Deutekom; Ireen Wüst	3:05.62	
6	United States; Margaret Crowley; Maria Lamb; Catherine Raney	3:04.22	

Final D (7th place)

Seed	Team	Time	Notes
2	Norway; Annette Bjelkevik; Hedvig Bjelkevik; Maren Haugli	3:06.20	
8	China; Ji Jia; Wang Fei; Zhang Xiaolei	3:06.91	
