= Speed skating at the 2007 Asian Winter Games – Women's 1500 metres =

Women's 1500 metres at the 2007 Asian Winter Games
- Venue: Jilin Provincial Speed Skating Rink
- Dates: 31 January 2007
- Competitors: 17 from 5 nations

Medalists
gold medal	Wang Fei	China
silver medal	Lee Ju-yeon	South Korea
bronze medal	Ji Jia	China

The women's 1500 metres at the 2007 Asian Winter Games was held on 31 January 2007 in Changchun, China.

== Schedule ==
All times are China Standard Time (UTC+08:00)

Date	Time	Event
Wednesday, 31 January 2007	16:00	Final

== Records ==
Prior to this competition, the existing world and Games records were as follows.

World Record	Cindy Klassen (CAN)	1:51.79	Salt Lake City, United States	20 November 2005
Games Record	Maki Tabata (JPN)	2:05.66	Hachinohe, Japan	3 February 2003

== Results ==
Legend

- DSQ — Disqualified

Rank	Pair	Athlete	Time	Notes
1st place, gold medalist(s)	9	Wang Fei (CHN)	2:00.49	GR
2nd place, silver medalist(s)	8	Lee Ju-yeon (KOR)	2:01.60	
3rd place, bronze medalist(s)	6	Ji Jia (CHN)	2:01.82	
4	6	Noh Seon-yeong (KOR)	2:02.80	
5	8	Masako Hozumi (JPN)	2:02.94	
6	4	Eriko Ishino (JPN)	2:03.07	
7	7	Hiromi Otsu (JPN)	2:03.53	
8	5	Gao Yang (CHN)	2:04.25	
9	3	Baek Eun-bi (KOR)	2:05.01	
10	7	Zhang Xiaolei (CHN)	2:05.62	
11	4	Natalya Rybakova (KAZ)	2:06.31	
12	3	Lee So-yeon (KOR)	2:06.80	
13	2	O Hyon-sun (PRK)	2:08.59	
14	2	Anzhelika Gavrilova (KAZ)	2:09.78	
15	5	Yelena Obaturova (KAZ)	2:12.64	
16	1	Mariya Ivanova (KAZ)	2:15.75	
—	9	Maki Tabata (JPN)	DSQ	
