= China at the 2006 Winter Olympics =

- IOC code: CHN
- NOC: Chinese Olympic Committee
- Website: www.olympic.cn (in Chinese and English)

in Turin
- Competitors: 76 in 9 sports
- Flag bearer: Yang Yang (A)
- Medals Ranked 14th: Gold 2 Silver 4 Bronze 5 Total 11

Winter Olympics appearances (overview)
- 1980; 1984; 1988; 1992; 1994; 1998; 2002; 2006; 2010; 2014; 2018; 2022; 2026

China competed at the 2006 Winter Olympics in Turin, Italy. Yang Yang (A), a short track speed skater, served as flag bearer at the Opening Ceremonies. Like most previous Olympics, coverage was via CCTV-5. The team excluded athletes from the Special Administrative Region of Hong Kong, which competed separately as Hong Kong, China.

== Medalists ==
Medal	Name	Sport	Event	Date
Gold	Wang Meng	Short track speed skating	Women's 500 m	15 Feb
Gold	Han Xiaopeng	Freestyle skiing	Men's aerials	23 Feb
Silver	Zhang Dan; Zhang Hao	Figure skating	Pairs	13 Feb
Silver	Wang Manli	Speed skating	Women's 500 m	14 Feb
Silver	Li Nina	Freestyle skiing	Women's aerials	22 Feb
Silver	Wang Meng	Short track speed skating	Women's 1000 m	25 Feb
Bronze	Li Jiajun	Short track speed skating	Men's 1500 m	12 Feb
Bronze	Shen Xue; Zhao Hongbo	Figure skating	Pairs	13 Feb
Bronze	Ren Hui	Speed skating	Women's 500 m	14 Feb
Bronze	Wang Meng	Short track speed skating	Women's 1500 m	18 Feb
Bronze	Yang Yang (A)	Short track speed skating	Women's 1000 m	25 Feb

Medals by sport
Sport	Gold medal	Silver medal	Bronze medal	Total
Short track speed skating	1	1	3	5
Freestyle skiing	1	1	0	2
Figure skating	0	1	1	2
Speed skating	0	1	1	2
Total	2	4	5	11

Medals by date						Cumulative			
Day	Date	Gold medal	Silver medal	Bronze medal	Total	Gold medal	Silver medal	Bronze medal	Total
Day 1	11th	0	0	0	0	0	0	0	0
Day 2	12th	0	0	1	1	0	0	1	1
Day 3	13th	0	1	1	2	0	1	2	3
Day 4	14th	0	1	1	2	0	2	3	5
Day 5	15th	1	0	0	1	1	2	3	6
Day 6	16th	0	0	0	0	1	2	3	6
Day 7	17th	0	0	0	0	1	2	3	6
Day 8	18th	0	0	1	1	1	2	4	7
Day 9	19th	0	0	0	0	1	2	4	7
Day 10	20th	0	0	0	0	1	2	4	7
Day 11	21st	0	0	0	0	1	2	4	7
Day 12	22nd	0	1	0	1	1	3	4	8
Day 13	23rd	1	0	0	1	2	3	4	9
Day 14	24th	0	0	0	0	2	3	4	9
Day 15	25th	0	1	1	2	2	4	5	11
Day 16	26th	0	0	0	0	2	4	5	11
Total		2	4	5	11	2	4	5	11

Multiple medalists
Name	Sport	Gold medal	Silver medal	Bronze medal	Total
Wang Meng	Short track speed skating	1	1	1	3

== Alpine skiing ==
Athlete	Event	Final				
Athlete	Event	Run 1	Run 2	Run 3	Total	Rank
Dong Jinzhi	Women's giant slalom	1:11.61	1:24.11	n/a	2:35.72	38
Dong Jinzhi	Women's slalom	55.40	58.66	n/a	1:54.06	50
Li Guangxu	Men's giant slalom	1:32.63	1:35.44	n/a	3:08.07	40
Li Guangxu	Men's slalom	1:08.84	did not finish			

Note: In the men's combined, run 1 is the downhill, and runs 2 and 3 are the slalom. In the women's combined, run 1 and 2 are the slalom, and run 3 the downhill.

== Biathlon ==
Athlete	Event	Final		
Athlete	Event	Time	Misses	Rank
Hou Yuxia	Women's sprint	25:25.8	5	54
Hou Yuxia	Women's pursuit	did not start		
Hou Yuxia	Women's mass start	45:40.1	10	28
Hou Yuxia	Women's individual	58:35.7	9	58
Kong Yingchao	Women's sprint	24:07.0	1	24
Kong Yingchao	Women's pursuit	40:41.9	4	17
Kong Yingchao	Women's mass start	44:45.0	3	23
Kong Yingchao	Women's individual	54:03.5	3	25
Liu Xianying	Women's sprint	23:17.5	1	11
Liu Xianying	Women's pursuit	39:25.3	4	9
Liu Xianying	Women's mass start	41:57.2	2	7
Liu Xianying	Women's individual	53:55.6	5	23
Sun Ribo	Women's sprint	23:57.6	2	21
Sun Ribo	Women's pursuit	41:28.8	9	22
Sun Ribo	Women's mass start	44:29.3	7	22
Yin Qiao	Women's individual	55:06.2	4	31
Zhang Chengye	Men's sprint	27:50.9	3	17
Zhang Chengye	Men's pursuit	39:04.7	10	34
Zhang Chengye	Men's individual	1:00:49.1	7	50
Kong Yingchao; Sun Ribo; Liu Xianying; Yin Qiao	Women's relay	1:21:43.7	2+13	9

== Cross-country skiing ==
Zhang Chengye competed in both the biathlon and cross-country skiing for China.

Distance

Men

Athlete	Event	Final	
Athlete	Event	Total	Rank
Han Dawei	30 km pursuit	Did not finish	
Li Geilang	15 km classical	43:14.7	62
Li Geilang	50 km freestyle	2:10:36.9	48
Li Zhiguang	30 km pursuit	Did not finish	
Ren Long	30 km pursuit	1:26:26.4	62
Ren Long	50 km freestyle	2:16:15.0	63
Tian Ye	15 km classical	43:32.2	64
Wang Songtao	15 km classical	44:12.2	70
Xia Wan	15 km classical	41:48.0	49
Xia Wan	30 km pursuit	1:22:31.7	51
Xia Wan	50 km freestyle	Did not finish	
Zheng Qing	50 km freestyle	2:12:13.0	53
Xia Wan; Li Geilang; Zhang Chengye; Zheng Qing	4 x 10 km relay	1:50:40.5	15

Women

Athlete	Event	Final	
Athlete	Event	Total	Rank
Huo Li	10 km classical	31:58.7	55
Huo Li	30 km freestyle	1:32:28.8	46
Jiang Chunli	10 km classical	32:22.1	58
Li Hongxue	10 km classical	30:33.9	36
Li Hongxue	15 km pursuit	45:56.4	27
Li Hongxue	30 km freestyle	1:28:49.8	33
Liu Yuanyuan	15 km pursuit	46:18.5	32
Liu Yuanyuan	30 km freestyle	1:32:00.9	45
Man Dandan	30 km freestyle	Did not finish	
Wang Chunli	10 km classical	29:34.6	18
Wang Chunli	15 km pursuit	45:09.6	21
Xu Yinghui	15 km pursuit	49:47.3	58
Wang Chunli; Li Hongxue; Liu Yuanyuan; Song Bo	4 x 5 km relay	58:42.5	16

Sprint

Men

Athlete	Event	Qualifying		Quarterfinal		Semifinal		Final	
Athlete	Event	Total	Rank	Total	Rank	Total	Rank	Total	Rank
Chen Haibin	Sprint	2:32.01	70	Did not advance					70
Tian Ye	Sprint	2:25.85	53	Did not advance					53
Zhang Chengye	Sprint	2:24.18	48	Did not advance					48
Zhang Qing	Sprint	2:27.90	58	Did not advance					58
Li Geilang; Tian Ye	Team sprint	n/a				18:57.4	10	Did not advance	

Women

Athlete	Event	Qualifying		Quarterfinal		Semifinal		Final	
Athlete	Event	Total	Rank	Total	Rank	Total	Rank	Total	Rank
Jia Yuping	Sprint	2:30.03	61	Did not advance					61
Liu Liming	Sprint	2:35.76	65	Did not advance					65
Man Dandan	Sprint	2:25.16	56	Did not advance					56
Song Bo	Sprint	2:27.07	57	Did not advance					57
Jiang Chunli; Wang Chunli	Team sprint	n/a				18:18.4	7	Did not advance	

== Figure skating ==
The pairs event in figure skating captured sports headlines in China on Valentine's Day. Although the Russian pair captured the gold medal, the Chinese performances that earned the silver and bronze received significant praise from the media. China's Zhang Dan and Zhang Hao finished an almost flawless free skate after falling some 40 seconds into the program with a failed quadruple throw attempt. Many media outlets characterized the performance as the pinnacle of Chinese hard work and discipline. Sohu's official headline was "Pairs skaters capture silver, inspires world". Meanwhile, veteran Zhao Hongbo, who was nursing an ankle injury, and his partner Shen Xue finished on the podium after a slightly disappointing performance in the short program.

Athlete	Event	CD		SP/OD		FS/FD		Total	
Athlete	Event	Points	Rank	Points	Rank	Points	Rank	Points	Rank
Li Chengjiang	Men's	n/a		60.23	21 Q	121.98	13	182.21	16
Liu Yan	Ladies'	n/a		49.84	15 Q	95.46	11	145.30	11
Zhang Min	Men's	n/a		67.39	11 Q	128.88	11	196.27	10
Pang Qing; Tong Jian	Pairs	n/a		63.19	4	123.48	4	186.67	4
Shen Xue; Zhao Hongbo	Pairs	n/a		62.32	5	124.59	3	186.91	Bronze medal
Zhang Dan; Zhang Hao	Pairs	n/a		64.72	2	125.01	2	189.73	Silver medal

Key: CD = Compulsory Dance, FD = Free Dance, FS = Free Skate, OD = Original Dance, SP = Short Program

== Freestyle skiing ==
Athlete	Event	Qualifying		Final	
Athlete	Event	Points	Rank	Points	Rank
Guo Xinxin	Women's aerials	204.87	2 Q	174.85	6
Han Xiaopeng	Men's aerials	250.45	1 Q	250.77	Gold medal
Li Nina	Women's aerials	188.93	3 Q	197.39	Silver medal
Liu Zhongqing	Men's aerials	201.26	18	did not advance	18
Ou Xiaotao	Men's aerials	180.31	23	did not advance	23
Qiu Sen	Men's aerials	236.50	6 Q	186.56	11
Wang Jiao	Women's aerials	160.22	12 Q	132.53	11
Xu Nannan	Women's aerials	172.01	7 Q	191.23	4

== Short track speed skating ==
Athlete	Event	Heat		Quarterfinal		Semifinal		Final	
Athlete	Event	Time	Rank	Time	Rank	Time	Rank	Time	Rank
Cheng Xiaolei	Women's 1500 m	2:50.017	5	did not advance					27
Fu Tianyu	Women's 500 m	45.636	1 Q	44.760	1 Q	45.130	1 Q	disqualified	
Li Haonan	Men's 500 m	42.703	2 Q	disqualified					
Li Jiajun	Men's 500 m	42.703	2 Q	disqualified					
Li Jiajun	Men's 1000 m	1:27.048	1 Q	1:28.179	1 Q	1:47.965	3	Final B not contested	6
Li Jiajun	Men's 1500 m	2:19.631	2 Q	n/a		2:17.836	2 Q	2:26.005	Bronze medal
Li Ye	Men's 1000 m	1:27.048 OR	1 Q	1:27.078	2 Q	1:47.965	3 Adv	1:29.918	5
Li Ye	Men's 1500 m	2:27.622	1 Q	n/a		2:19.386	1 Q	disqualified	
Wang Meng	Women's 500 m	45.011	1 Q	45.257	1 Q	44.650	1 Q	44.345	Gold medal
Wang Meng	Women's 1000 m	1:37.161	1 Q	1:33.453	2 Q	1:31.783	1 Q	1:33.079	Silver medal
Wang Meng	Women's 1500 m	2:41.384	1 Q	n/a		2:27.095	2 Q	2:24.469	Bronze medal
Yang Yang (A)	Women's 1000 m	1:34.878	1 Q	1:59.338	4 ADV	1:33.080	2 Q	1:33.937	Bronze medal
Yang Yang (A)	Women's 1500 m	2:37.754	1 Q	n/a		2:23.048	3	Final B 2:32.097	11
Li Haonan; Li Jiajun; Li Ye; Sui Baoku	Men's 5000 m relay	n/a				6:55.476	2 Q	6:53.989	5
Cheng Xiaolei; Fu Tianyu; Wang Meng; Yang Yang (A)	Women's 3000 m relay	n/a				4:16.739	1 Q	disqualified	

Key: 'ADV' indicates a skater was advanced due to being interfered with.

== Ski jumping ==
Athlete	Event	Qualifying		First Round		Final		
Athlete	Event	Points	Rank	Points	Rank	Points	Total	Rank
Li Yang	Normal hill	109.0	26 Q	102.5	44	did not advance		44
Li Yang	Large hill	64.8	40	did not advance				40
Zhandong Tian	Normal hill	102.0	39	did not advance				39
Zhandong Tian	Large hill	67.4	38	did not advance				38
Li Yang; Zhandong Tian; Wang Jianxun; Yang Guang	Team	206.1	16	did not advance				16

Note: PQ indicates a skier was pre-qualified for the final, based on entry rankings.

== Snowboarding ==
Halfpipe

Athlete	Event	Qualifying Run 1		Qualifying Run 2		Final		
Athlete	Event	Points	Rank	Points	Rank	Run 1	Run 2	Rank
Pan Lei	Women's halfpipe	15.6	25	16.0	22	did not advance		28
Sun Zhifang	Women's halfpipe	11.3	28	10.2	25	did not advance		31

Note: In the final, the single best score from two runs is used to determine the ranking. A bracketed score indicates a run that wasn't counted.

== Speed skating ==
Men

Athlete	Event	Race 1		Final	
Athlete	Event	Time	Rank	Time	Rank
An Weijiang	500 m	35.89	35.67	1:11.56	19
An Weijiang	1000 m	n/a		1:11.80	33
Gao Xuefeng	1500 m	n/a		1:49.91	30
Gao Xuefeng	5000 m	n/a		6:44.78	25
Li Changyu	1500 m	n/a		1:53.32	40
Li Yu	500 m	36.57	36.56	1:13.13	33
Lu Zhuo	500 m	36.39	35.96	1:12.35	28
Lu Zhuo	1000 m	n/a		1:12.69	38
Yu Fengtong	500 m	35.39	35.29	1:10.68	5
Yu Fengtong	1000 m	n/a		1:11.90	34
Zhang Zhongqi	1000 m	n/a		1:12.29	35

Women

Athlete	Event	Race 1		Final	
Athlete	Event	Time	Rank	Time	Rank
Ji Jia	1500 m	n/a		2:01.85	22
Ji Jia	3000 m	n/a		4:21.06	25
Ren Hui	500 m	38.60	38.27	1:16.87	Bronze medal
Ren Hui	1000 m	n/a		did not finish	
Wang Beixing	500 m	38.71	38.56	1:17.27	7
Wang Beixing	1000 m	n/a		1:19.03	29
Wang Fei	1500 m	n/a		2:00.13	12
Wang Fei	3000 m	n/a		4:10.55	12
Wang Fei	5000 m	n/a		7:22.90	15
Wang Manli	500 m	38.31	38.47	1:16.78	Silver medal
Wang Manli	1000 m	n/a		1:17.90	20
Xing Aihua	500 m	39.20	39.15	1:18.35	13
Zhang Shuang	1000 m	n/a		1:19.91	31
Zhang Xiaolei	1500 m	n/a		2:05.75	34

Team pursuit

Athlete	Event	Seeding		Quarterfinal	Semifinal	Final	
Athlete	Event	Time	Rank	Opposition Time	Opposition Time	Opposition Time	Rank
From: Ji Jia, Wang Fei, Zhang Xiaolei	Women's team pursuit	3:18.24	8	Russia (1); L 3:08.29	did not advance	7th place Final; Norway (2); L 3:06.91	8
