= List of Universiade records in speed skating =

This is the list of Winter Universiade records in speed skating maintained by FISU, current after the 2017 Winter Universiade.

== Men ==
Event	Record	Athlete	Nationality	Date	Edition	Place	Ref
500 meters	34.71	Lee Kang-seok	South Korea	19 January 2007	2007 Universiade	Turin, Italy	
500 meters × 2	69.71	Lee Kang-seok	South Korea	19 January 2007	2007 Universiade	Turin, Italy	
1000 meters	1:09.32	Mirko Giacomo Nenzi	Italy	17 December 2013	2013 Universiade	Baselga di Piné, Italy	
1500 meters	1:45.66	Enrico Fabris	Italy	21 January 2007	2007 Universiade	Turin, Italy	
5000 meters	6:29.94	Arjen van der Kieft	Netherlands	20 February 2009	2009 Universiade	Harbin, China	
10000 meters	13:28.42	Mark Ooijevaar	Netherlands	22 January 2007	2007 Universiade	Turin, Italy	
Team pursuit (8 laps)	3:47.25	Matteo Anesi; Enrico Fabris; Luca Stefani	Italy	23 January 2007	2007 Universiade	Turin, Italy	

== Women ==
Event	Record	Athlete	Nationality	Date	Edition	Place	Ref
500 meters	38.16	Lee Sang-hwa	South Korea	19 February 2009	2009 Universiade	Harbin, China	
500 meters × 2	76.36	Lee Sang-hwa	South Korea	19 February 2009	2009 Universiade	Harbin, China	
1000 meters	1:16.83	Jin Peiyu	China	25 February 2009	2009 Universiade	Harbin, China	
1500 meters	1:59.03	Nao Kodaira	Japan	20 February 2009	2009 Universiade	Harbin, China	
3000 meters	4:12.33	Anna Rokita	Austria	19 January 2007	2007 Universiade	Turin, Italy	
5000 meters	7:05.17	Martina Sáblíková	Czech Republic	17 December 2013	2013 Universiade	Baselga di Piné, Italy	
Team pursuit (6 laps)	3:05.94	Dong Feifei; Fu Chunyan; Ji Jia	China	26 February 2009	2009 Universiade	Harbin, China	
