= Norway at the 2006 Winter Olympics =

- IOC code: NOR
- NOC: Norwegian Olympic Committee and Confederation of Sports
- Website: www.idrett.no (in Norwegian)

in Turin
- Competitors: 69 (47 men, 22 women) in 10 sports
- Flag bearers: Pål Trulsen (opening); Frode Estil (closing)
- Medals Ranked 13th: Gold 2 Silver 8 Bronze 9 Total 19

Winter Olympics appearances (overview)
- 1924; 1928; 1932; 1936; 1948; 1952; 1956; 1960; 1964; 1968; 1972; 1976; 1980; 1984; 1988; 1992; 1994; 1998; 2002; 2006; 2010; 2014; 2018; 2022; 2026

Norway sent 74 athletes to the 2006 Winter Olympics in Turin, Italy. At the 2002 Winter Olympics Norway won the most gold medals, and before the Turin games, Norwegian sports officials were aiming for more than the 25 medals they won in Salt Lake City — the president of the Norwegian Skiing Federation Sverre Seeberg was quoted saying he thought Norway would win 25 medals in the skiing events alone (alpine skiing, cross-country skiing, freestyle skiing, Nordic combined and ski jumping). The Norwegian Olympic Committee aimed for Norway to be the best nation measured in the number of gold medals. However, Norway won only two gold medals in the games, the lowest amount since 1988.

In addition to the skiing events, Norway also qualified athletes in biathlon, curling, skeleton, snowboarding and speed skating. In addition to IOC qualifying times, the Norwegian Olympic Committee have required that athletes need to place themselves once in the top six or twice in the top twelve in major individual events in the sport to be selected. Curler Pål Trulsen served as flag bearer at the opening ceremony.

== Medalists ==
Medal	Name	Sport	Event
Gold	Kjetil André Aamodt	Alpine skiing	Men's super-G
Gold	Lars Bystøl	Ski jumping	Normal hill
Silver	Halvard Hanevold	Biathlon	Men's sprint
Silver	Ole Einar Bjørndalen	Biathlon	Men's pursuit
Silver	Ole Einar Bjørndalen	Biathlon	Men's individual
Silver	Frode Estil	Cross-country skiing	Men's 30 km pursuit
Silver	Marit Bjørgen	Cross-country skiing	Women's 10 km classical
Silver	Tor Arne Hetland; Jens Arne Svartedal	Cross-country skiing	Men's team sprint
Silver	Kari Traa	Freestyle skiing	Women's moguls
Silver	Magnus Moan	Nordic combined	Sprint
Bronze	Frode Andresen	Biathlon	Men's sprint
Bronze	Ole Einar Bjørndalen	Biathlon	Men's mass start
Bronze	Halvard Hanevold	Biathlon	Men's individual
Bronze	Hilde Gjermundshaug Pedersen	Cross-country skiing	Women's 10 km classical
Bronze	Magnus Moan	Nordic combined	Individual
Bronze	Roar Ljøkelsøy	Ski jumping	Normal hill
Bronze	Lars Bystøl	Ski jumping	Large hill
Bronze	Lars Bystøl; Bjørn Einar Romøren; Tommy Ingebrigtsen; Roar Ljøkelsøy	Ski jumping	Team
Bronze	Kjersti Buaas	Snowboarding	Women's halfpipe

Medals by sport
Sport	gold	silver	bronze	Total
Ski jumping	1	0	3	4
Alpine skiing	1	0	0	1
Biathlon	0	3	3	6
Cross-country skiing	0	3	1	4
Nordic combined	0	1	1	2
Freestyle skiing	0	1	0	1
Snowboarding	0	0	1	1
Total	2	8	9	19

== Alpine skiing ==
Athlete	Event	Final				
Athlete	Event	Run 1	Run 2	Run 3	Total	Rank
Kjetil André Aamodt	Men's downhill	n/a			1:49.88	4
Kjetil André Aamodt	Men's super-G	n/a			1:30.65	Gold medal
Kjetil André Aamodt	Men's combined	did not start				
Hans-Petter Buraas	Men's slalom	did not finish				
Kjetil Jansrud	Men's giant slalom	1:19.32	did not start			
Kjetil Jansrud	Men's combined	1:41.55	46.02	44.75	3:12.32	10
Lasse Kjus	Men's downhill	n/a			1:50.64	14
Lasse Kjus	Men's super-G	n/a			1:31.79	14
Lasse Kjus	Men's giant slalom	1:18.73	1:20.58	n/a	2:39.31	18
Lasse Kjus	Men's combined	1:39.63	did not finish			
Lars Elton Myhre	Men's slalom	did not finish				
Bjarne Solbakken	Men's downhill	n/a			1:51.72	29
Bjarne Solbakken	Men's super-G	n/a			1:32.90	26
Bjarne Solbakken	Men's giant slalom	1:19.15	1:20.46	n/a	2:39.61	20
Aksel Lund Svindal	Men's downhill	n/a			1:50.90	21
Aksel Lund Svindal	Men's super-G	n/a			1:31.10	5
Aksel Lund Svindal	Men's giant slalom	1:17.10	1:18.96	n/a	2:36.06	6
Aksel Lund Svindal	Men's slalom	54.97	did not finish			
Aksel Lund Svindal	Men's combined	1:39.26	did not finish			

Note: In the men's combined, run 1 is the downhill, and runs 2 and 3 are the slalom. In the women's combined, run 1 and 2 are the slalom, and run 3 the downhill.

== Biathlon ==
Men

Athlete	Event	Final		
Athlete	Event	Time	Misses	Rank
Frode Andresen	Sprint	26:31.3	1	Bronze medal
Frode Andresen	Pursuit	36:16.97	6	6
Frode Andresen	Mass start	49:03.6	6	19
Frode Andresen	Individual	57:10.2	3	15
Ole Einar Bjørndalen	Sprint	27:25.5	3	11
Ole Einar Bjørndalen	Pursuit	35:22.96	6	Silver medal
Ole Einar Bjørndalen	Mass start	47:32.3	3	Bronze medal
Ole Einar Bjørndalen	Individual	54:39.0	2	Silver medal
Stian Eckhoff	Sprint	27:48.0	2	16
Stian Eckhoff	Pursuit	38:00.28	6	21
Stian Eckhoff	Individual	57:11.8	3	16
Halvard Hanevold	Sprint	26:19.8	0	Silver medal
Halvard Hanevold	Pursuit	35:57.74	3	5
Halvard Hanevold	Mass start	48:14.9	3	7
Halvard Hanevold	Individual	55:31.9	2	Bronze medal
Emil Hegle Svendsen	Mass start	48:13.8	2	6
Halvard Hanevold; Stian Eckhoff; Frode Andresen; Ole Einar Bjørndalen	Relay	1:23:03.6	11	5

Women

Athlete	Event	Final		
Athlete	Event	Time	Misses	Rank
Gunn Margit Andreassen	Individual	59:04.3	6	60
Tora Berger	Sprint	24:05.8	1	23
Tora Berger	Pursuit	40:44.82	3	18
Tora Berger	Mass start	45:23.2	3	25
Tora Berger	Individual	52:53.4	2	13
Gro Marit Istad Kristiansen	Sprint	24:34.0	1	40
Gro Marit Istad Kristiansen	Pursuit	43:41.59	7	40
Liv Grete Skjelbreid-Poirée	Sprint	23:20.0	2	12
Liv Grete Skjelbreid-Poirée	Pursuit	39:03.43	4	6
Liv Grete Skjelbreid-Poirée	Mass start	43:43.8	4	18
Liv Grete Skjelbreid-Poirée	Individual	52:22.0	3	9
Linda Grubben	Sprint	23:48.5	1	19
Linda Grubben	Pursuit	40:19.89	4	15
Linda Grubben	Mass start	42:46.5	3	14
Linda Grubben	Individual	56:47.8	6	50
Tora Berger; Liv Grete Skjelbreid-Poirée; Gunn Margit Andreassen; Linda Grubben	Relay	1:19:34.4	14	5

== Cross-country skiing ==
On 9 January the selection of four male athletes for the sprint event was made public. Following the conclusion of the individual events at the 2006 Norwegian Championships, a further thirteen skiers were selected.

The Norwegian director of cross-country skiing sport, Bjørnar Håkensmoen, received "terribly many" reactions after he announced the team on 21 January, and the following day the newspaper Aftenposten asked him whether he "regretted" not selecting Petter Northug, who had won both the double pursuit and the relay (as part of a team representing Strindheim IL) at the Norwegian Skiing Championship.

Distance

Men

Athlete	Event	Final	
Athlete	Event	Total	Rank
Jan Egil Andresen	30 km pursuit	1:19:29.8	27
Jan Egil Andresen	50 km freestyle	2:08:43.7	41
Anders Aukland	15 km classical	39:53.6	20
Anders Aukland	30 km pursuit	1:19:30.6	28
Frode Estil	15 km classical	39:39.6	16
Frode Estil	30 km pursuit	1:17:01.4	Silver medal
Frode Estil	50 km freestyle	2:07:06.1	28
Tord Asle Gjerdalen	30 km pursuit	1:17:36.2	18
Tord Asle Gjerdalen	50 km freestyle	2:06:26.2	15
Tor Arne Hetland	50 km freestyle	2:07:36.2	33
Odd-Bjørn Hjelmeset	15 km classical	40:31.3	28
Jens Arne Svartedal	15 km classical	41:32.4	45
Jens Arne Svartedal; Odd-Bjørn Hjelmeset; Frode Estil; Tore Ruud Hofstad	4 x 10 km relay	1:44:56.3	5

Women

Athlete	Event	Final	
Athlete	Event	Total	Rank
Marit Bjørgen	10 km classical	28:12.7	Silver medal
Marit Bjørgen	15 km pursuit	Did not finish	
Ella Gjømle	30 km freestyle	1:28:28.2	29
Hilde Gjermundshaug Pedersen	10 km classical	28:14.0	Bronze medal
Hilde Gjermundshaug Pedersen	15 km pursuit	43:40.5	10
Kristin Størmer Steira	10 km classical	28:21.0	4
Kristin Størmer Steira	15 km pursuit	43:06.8	4
Kristin Størmer Steira	30 km freestyle	1:22:40.8	4
Kristin Mürer Stemland	10 km classical	29:20.5	12
Kristin Mürer Stemland	15 km pursuit	44:59.2	19
Kristin Mürer Stemland	30 km freestyle	1:27:05.9	24
Kristin Størmer Steira; Hilde Gjermundshaug Pedersen; Kristin Mürer Stemland; Marit Bjørgen	4 x 5 km relay	55:21.8	5

Sprint

Athlete	Event	Qualifying		Quarterfinal		Semifinal		Final	
Athlete	Event	Total	Rank	Total	Rank	Total	Rank	Total	Rank
Marit Bjørgen	Women's sprint	2:16.38	17 Q	2:16.8	4	Did not advance			18
Ella Gjømle	Women's sprint	2:16.02	13 Q	2:15.7	2 Q	2:16.4	4	Final B 2:18.2	6
Ola Vigen Hattestad	Men's sprint	2:17.26	12 Q	2:23.1	1 Q	2:29.0	5	Did not advance	9
Tor Arne Hetland	Men's sprint	2:17.91	15 Q	2:26.1	2 Q	2:43.2	5	Did not advance	10
Trond Iversen	Men's sprint	2:16.25	7 Q	2:22.5	4 Q	Did not advance			17
Johan Kjølstad	Men's sprint	2:15.11	3 Q	2:20.2	1 Q	2:27.1	4	Final B 2:25.6	7
Hilde Gjermundshaug Pedersen	Women's sprint	2:17.17	23 Q	2:19.1	6	Did not advance			28
Tor Arne Hetland; Jens Arne Svartedal	Men's team sprint	n/a				17:22.1	1 Q	17:03.5	Silver medal
Marit Bjørgen; Ella Gjømle	Women's team sprint	n/a				17:14.4	1 Q	16:48.1	4

== Curling ==
The curling teams for men and women were nominated following the 2005 European Curling Championships, where Pål Trulsen and his team won gold for men, while Dordi Nordby finished fourth with her team.

Trulsen's team were the reigning Olympic champions, while Nordby had finished seventh in 2002 and fifth in 1998.

=== Men's ===
Team: Pål Trulsen (skip), Lars Vågberg, Flemming Davanger, Bent Ånund Ramsfjell, Torger Nergård (alternate)

Round Robin
Draw 1

Team	1	2	3	4	5	6	7	8	9	10	Final
Norway (Trulsen)	1	0	0	2	0	2	0	0	X	X	5
United States (Fenson) 🔨	0	2	1	0	3	0	0	5	X	X	11

;Draw 3

Team	1	2	3	4	5	6	7	8	9	10	Final
Norway (Trulsen)	0	0	0	0	1	0	0	3	3	X	5
Switzerland (Stöckli) 🔨	0	0	0	1	0	1	0	0	0	X	2

;Draw 4

Team	1	2	3	4	5	6	7	8	9	10	Final
Sweden (Lindholm)	1	0	1	1	0	1	0	0	X	X	4
Norway (Trulsen) 🔨	0	4	0	0	2	0	2	1	X	X	9

;Draw 5

Team	1	2	3	4	5	6	7	8	9	10	Final
Great Britain (Murdoch)	0	0	0	1	0	0	2	0	2	1	6
Norway (Trulsen) 🔨	0	1	0	0	0	1	0	1	0	0	3

;Draw 6

Team	1	2	3	4	5	6	7	8	9	10	11	Final
Norway (Trulsen)	0	0	1	1	1	0	0	0	2	0	-	5
Canada (Gushue) 🔨	2	1	0	0	0	0	1	1	0	1	-	6

;Draw 7

Team	1	2	3	4	5	6	7	8	9	10	Final
Italy (Retornaz)	0	0	2	0	1	0	0	X	X	X	3
Norway (Trulsen) 🔨	0	2	0	4	0	1	4	X	X	X	11

;Draw 9

Team	1	2	3	4	5	6	7	8	9	10	Final
Finland (Uusipaavalniemi) 🔨	1	0	0	1	3	0	1	0	0	1	7
Norway (Trulsen)	0	0	1	0	0	1	0	1	0	0	3

;Draw 10

Team	1	2	3	4	5	6	7	8	9	10	Final
Norway (Trulsen)	0	2	0	0	3	0	1	0	2	1	9
New Zealand (Becker) 🔨	1	0	1	0	0	2	0	2	0	0	6

;Draw 11

Team	1	2	3	4	5	6	7	8	9	10	Final
Norway (Trulsen) 🔨	0	0	1	0	0	2	0	1	0	1	5
Germany (Kapp)	0	1	0	0	1	0	0	0	0	0	2

Standings

Rank	Team	Skip	Won	Lost
1	Finland	Markku Uusipaavalniemi	7	2
2	Canada	Brad Gushue	6	3
3	United States	Pete Fenson	6	3
4	Great Britain	David Murdoch	6	3
5	Norway	Pål Trulsen	5	4
6	Switzerland	Ralph Stockli	5	4
7	Italy	Joel Retornaz	4	5
8	Sweden	Peter Lindholm	3	6
9	Germany	Andy Kapp	3	6
10	New Zealand	Sean Becker	0	9

=== Women's ===
Team: Dordi Nordby (skip), Marianne Haslum, Marianne Rørvik, Camilla Holth, Charlotte Hovring (alternate)

Round Robin
Draw 1

Team	1	2	3	4	5	6	7	8	9	10	Final
Norway (Nordby)	0	1	0	0	3	0	3	2	1	1	11
United States (Johnson) 🔨	2	0	1	1	0	2	0	0	0	0	6

;Draw 2

Team	1	2	3	4	5	6	7	8	9	10	Final
Norway (Nordby) 🔨	0	0	0	2	1	1	0	0	2	4	10
Sweden (Norberg)	0	0	1	0	0	0	1	1	0	0	3

;Draw 3

Team	1	2	3	4	5	6	7	8	9	10	Final
Norway (Nordby)	0	1	0	0	0	1	0	X	X	X	6
Switzerland (Ott) 🔨	2	0	1	1	1	0	4	X	X	X	5

;Draw 4

Team	1	2	3	4	5	6	7	8	9	10	Final
Japan (Onodera) 🔨	0	0	0	0	0	2	0	2	0	X	4
Norway (Nordby)	1	0	0	3	1	0	2	0	2	X	9

;Draw 6

Team	1	2	3	4	5	6	7	8	9	10	Final
Canada (Kleibrink)	0	2	0	2	0	1	0	3	2	0	10
Norway (Nordby) 🔨	1	0	2	0	2	0	1	0	0	2	8

;Draw 7

Team	1	2	3	4	5	6	7	8	9	10	11	Final
Norway (Nordby)	1	0	1	0	2	0	0	2	0	1	2	9
Italy (Gaspari) 🔨	0	2	0	1	0	1	2	0	1	0	0	7

;Draw 9

Team	1	2	3	4	5	6	7	8	9	10	Final
Great Britain (Martin)	0	0	3	0	0	0	1	0	0	X	4
Norway (Nordby) 🔨	2	0	0	1	1	1	0	1	2	X	8

;Draw 11

Team	1	2	3	4	5	6	7	8	9	10	Final
Denmark (Holm)	0	0	1	0	0	0	X	X	X	X	1
Norway (Nordby) 🔨	3	1	0	1	1	2	X	X	X	X	8

;Draw 12

Team	1	2	3	4	5	6	7	8	9	10	Final
Norway (Nordby)	0	2	0	1	0	2	0	2	1	0	8
Russia (Privivkova) 🔨	2	0	1	0	3	0	3	0	0	1	10

Standings

Rank	Team	Skip	Won	Lost
1	Sweden	Anette Norberg	7	2
2	Switzerland	Mirjam Ott	7	2
3	Canada	Shannon Kleibrink	6	3
4	Norway	Dordi Nordby	6	3
5	Great Britain	Rhona Martin	5	4
6	Russia	Ludmila Privivkova	5	4
7	Japan	Ayumi Onodera	4	5
8	Denmark	Dorthe Holm	2	7
9	United States	Cassandra Johnson	2	7
10	Italy	Diana Gaspari	1	8

Playoffs
Semifinal

Team	1	2	3	4	5	6	7	8	9	10	Final
Sweden (Norberg)	0	0	1	0	1	0	1	1	0	1	5
Norway (Nordby) 🔨	1	0	0	1	0	1	0	0	1	0	4

;Bronze Final

Team	1	2	3	4	5	6	7	8	9	10	Final
Norway (Nordby)	0	0	1	1	0	2	0	1	X	X	5
Canada (Kleibrink) 🔨	4	1	0	0	4	0	2	0	X	X	11

Key: The hammer indicates which team had the last stone in the first end.

== Freestyle skiing ==
Athlete	Event	Qualifying		Final	
Athlete	Event	Points	Rank	Points	Rank
Ingrid Berntsen	Women's moguls	22.45	14 Q	19.84	19
Kari Traa	Women's moguls	24.06	7 Q	25.65	Silver medal

== Nordic combined ==
Athlete	Event	Ski jumping		Cross-country		
Athlete	Event	Points	Rank	Deficit	Time	Rank
Kristian Hammer	Sprint	94.3	41	2:06	20:08.1 +1:39.1	28
Kristian Hammer	Individual Gundersen	183.0	44	5:18	44:50.8 +5:06.2	35
Håvard Klemetsen	Sprint	98.0	34	1:51	21:06.6 +2:37.6	40
Håvard Klemetsen	Individual Gundersen	229.0	15	2:14	43:00.5 +3:15.9	20
Magnus Moan	Sprint	111.8	13	0:56	18:34.4 +5.4	Silver medal
Magnus Moan	Individual Gundersen	237.5	9	1:40	40:00.8 +16.2	Bronze medal
Petter Tande	Sprint	118.2	5	0:30	18:59.1 +30.1	6
Petter Tande	Individual Gundersen	262.0	2	0:02	40:00.9 +16.3	4
Kristian Hammer; Håvard Klemetsen; Magnus Moan; Petter Tande	Team	did not start				

Note: 'Deficit' refers to the amount of time behind the leader a competitor began the cross-country portion of the event. Italicized numbers show the final deficit from the winner's finishing time.

== Skeleton ==
Athlete	Event	Final			
Athlete	Event	Run 1	Run 2	Total	Rank
Desiree Bjerke	Women's	1:00.92	1:01.70	2:02.62	9

== Ski jumping ==
Athlete	Event	Qualifying		First round		Final		
Athlete	Event	Points	Rank	Points	Rank	Points	Total	Rank
Lars Bystøl	Normal hill	0.0	PQ	131.0	6 Q	135.5	266.5	Gold medal
Lars Bystøl	Large hill	129.2	6 PQ	121.5	5 Q	129.2	250.7	Bronze medal
Roar Ljøkelsøy	Normal hill	120.5	10 PQ	132.0	5 Q	132.5	264.5	Bronze medal
Roar Ljøkelsøy	Large hill	114.1	10 PQ	127.8	3 Q	115.0	242.8	4
Sigurd Pettersen	Normal hill	disqualified						
Sigurd Pettersen	Large hill	115.9	2 Q	106.3	17 Q	96.2	202.5	24
Bjørn Einar Romøren	Normal hill	118.0	12 PQ	125.5	15 Q	122.5	248.0	15
Bjørn Einar Romøren	Large hill	120.9	8 PQ	121.8	4 Q	116.4	238.2	7
Lars Bystøl; Bjørn Einar Romøren; Tommy Ingebrigtsen; Roar Ljøkelsøy	Team	n/a		452.4	3 Q	497.7	650.1	Bronze medal

Note: PQ indicates a skier was pre-qualified for the final, based on entry rankings.

== Snowboarding ==
Halfpipe

Athlete	Event	Qualifying run 1		Qualifying run 2		Final		
Athlete	Event	Points	Rank	Points	Rank	Run 1	Run 2	Rank
Frederik Austbø	Men's halfpipe	29.2	18	13.0	32	did not advance		38
Kjersti Buaas	Women's halfpipe	19.2	21	41.9	2 Q	(40.9)	42.0	Bronze medal
Halvor Lunn	Men's halfpipe	24.2	25	26.4	24	did not advance		30
Kim Christiansen	Men's halfpipe	31.0	16	5.1	35	did not advance		41

Note: In the final, the single best score from two runs is used to determine the ranking. A bracketed score indicates a run that wasn't counted.

== Speed skating ==
Men

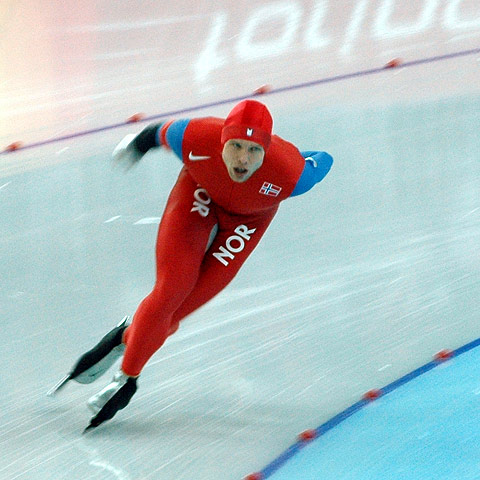
Eskil Ervik

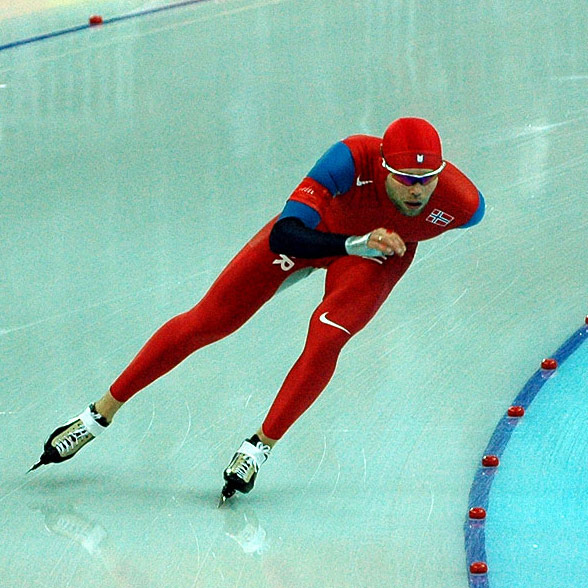
Lasse Sætre

Athlete	Event	Race 1		Final	
Athlete	Event	Time	Rank	Time	Rank
Petter Andersen	1000 m	n/a		1:10.38	18
Petter Andersen	1500 m	n/a		1:47.15	7
Håvard Bøkko	1500 m	did not finish			
Eskil Ervik	5000 m	n/a		6:26.91	10
Eskil Ervik	10000 m	n/a		13:37.62	11
Mikael Flygind-Larsen	1000 m	n/a		1:10.13	14
Mikael Flygind-Larsen	1500 m	n/a		1:47.28	8
Øystein Grødum	5000 m	n/a		6:24.21	8
Øystein Grødum	10000 m	n/a		13:12.58	4
Lasse Sætre	5000 m	n/a		6:25.15	9
Lasse Sætre	10000 m	n/a		13:12.93	5
Even Wetten	1000 m	n/a		1:10.57	23
Even Wetten	1500 m	n/a		1:47.78	10

Women

Athlete	Event	Race 1		Final	
Athlete	Event	Time	Rank	Time	Rank
Annette Bjelkevik	1500 m	n/a		2:01.03	17
Annette Bjelkevik	3000 m	n/a		4:17.57	37
Hedvig Bjelkevik	1500 m	n/a		2:02.16	26
Maren Haugli	1500 m	n/a		2:01.22	19
Maren Haugli	3000 m	n/a		4:12.50	15
Maren Haugli	5000 m	n/a		7:06.08	8

Team pursuit

Athlete	Event	Seeding		Quarterfinal	Semifinal	Final	
Athlete	Event	Time	Rank	Opposition Time	Opposition Time	Opposition Time	Rank
From: Eskil Ervik; Øystein Grødum; Lasse Sætre; Håvard Bøkko; Mikael Flygind-Larsen	Men's team pursuit	3:49.55	4	Germany (4); W 3:47.81	Canada (1); L 3:47.81	Bronze final Netherlands (3); L 3:45.96	4
From: Annette Bjelkevik; Hedvig Bjelkevik; Maren Haugli	Women's team pursuit	3:06.34	2	Japan (7); L Overtaken	did not finish	7th place final China (8); W 3:06.20	7

== Trivia ==
"Partly Norwegian" medal(ist)s

In the Norwegian media, two gold and one silver medal won by foreign athletes were humorously presented as part-Norwegian medals, since the medalists in question were of Norwegian descent or family:

- Women's snowboard cross gold medalist Tanja Frieden has a dual Swiss-Norwegian citizenship (mother is Norwegian) and speaks the language.
- Women's skeleton gold medalist Maya Pedersen, also of Switzerland, lives in Øyer Municipality, Norway, with her Norwegian husband, Snorre Pedersen.
- Women's 1,500 m speed skating silver medalist Kristina Groves, of Canada, is of Norwegian descent (many relatives in Stjørdal Municipality, Norway).

Grateful Canadian XC ski fans

A large group of Canadian winter sports fans was delighted and impressed by the Norwegian cross-country skiing sports director Bjørnar Håkensmoen's impulsive display of sportsmanship when he handed Canadian skier Sara Renner a ski pole only seconds after her own broke during the sprint relay. Renner and teammate Beckie Scott went on to win the silver medal (while the Norwegians placed fourth).

To show their appreciation, a group known as the "Independent Communications Dealers of Canada" mounted a "thank you" campaign called "Project Maple Syrup", organizing a shipment of 8,000 cans of maple syrup to Norway.
