= Speed skating at the 2011 Asian Winter Games – Women's team pursuit =

Women's team pursuit at the 2011 Asian Winter Games
- Venue: Alau Ice Palace
- Dates: 6 February 2011
- Competitors: 12 from 4 nations

Medalists
gold medal	South Korea; Lee Ju-yeon, Noh Seon-yeong, Park Do-yeong
silver medal	China; Fu Chunyan, Ji Jia, Wang Fei
bronze medal	Japan; Eriko Ishino, Shiho Ishizawa, Miho Takagi

The women's team pursuit speed skating at the 2011 Asian Winter Games was held on February 6, 2011. 4 nations participated. The race started at 12:05.

== Schedule ==
All times are Almaty Time (UTC+06:00)

Date	Time	Event
Sunday, 6 February 2011	12:05	Final

== Records ==
Prior to this competition, the existing world and Games records were as follows.

World Record	Canada	2:55.79	Calgary, Canada	6 December 2009
Games Record	—	—	—	—

== Results ==
Rank	Pair	Team	Time	Notes
1st place, gold medalist(s)	1	South Korea (KOR); Lee Ju-yeon; Noh Seon-yeong; Park Do-yeong	3:04.35	GR
2nd place, silver medalist(s)	1	China (CHN); Fu Chunyan; Ji Jia; Wang Fei	3:05.93	
3rd place, bronze medalist(s)	2	Japan (JPN); Eriko Ishino; Shiho Ishizawa; Miho Takagi	3:07.84	
4	2	Kazakhstan (KAZ); Yekaterina Aydova; Tatyana Sokirko; Olga Zhigina	3:17.62	
