= Speed skating at the 2007 Winter Universiade =

Speed skating at the XXIII Winter Universiade
- Venue: Oval Lingotto
- Dates: 18–23 January

Speed skating at the 2007 Winter Universiade was held at the Oval Lingotto from 18 to 23 January 2007.

== Medal summary ==
=== Medal table ===
* Host nation (Italy)

Rank	Nation	Gold	Silver	Bronze	Total
1	Netherlands (NED)	3	1	2	6
2	Italy (ITA)*	3	0	0	3
3	South Korea (KOR)	2	4	5	11
4	Austria (AUT)	2	0	0	2
5	Russia (RUS)	1	4	1	6
6	Poland (POL)	1	1	2	4
7	China (CHN)	0	1	1	2
7	Japan (JPN)	0	1	1	2
Totals (8 entries)		12	12	12	36

=== Men's events ===
Event	Gold		Silver		Bronze	
500 meters × 2	(South Korea) Lee Kang-seok	69.71 UR	(South Korea) Lee Ki-ho	70.37	(South Korea) Mo Tae-bum	71.18
1000 metres	(Italy) Enrico Fabris	1:09.68 UR	(South Korea) Lee Kang-seok	1:09.89	(Netherlands) Lars Elgersma	1:09.99
1500 metres	(Italy) Enrico Fabris	1:45.66 UR	(South Korea) Yeo Sang-yeop	1:48.08	(South Korea) Mo Tae-bum	1:48.49
5000 metres	(Netherlands) Mark Ooijevaar	6:32.71 UR	(Russia) Ivan Skobrev	6:34.97	(Russia) Andrey Burlyaev	6:36.02
10000 metres	(Netherlands) Mark Ooijevaar	13:28.42 UR	(Russia) Artem Belousov	13:44.00	(South Korea) Kim Myung-seok	13:44.18
Team pursuit	Italy (ITA); Matteo Anesi; Enrico Fabris; Luca Stefani	3:47.25 UR	Russia (RUS); Ivan Skobrev; Andrey Burlyaev; Alexey Yunin	3:48.62	Poland (POL); Sławomir Chmura; Sebastian Druszkiewicz; Konrad Niedźwiedzki; Robert Kustra	3:50.54

=== Women's events ===
Event	Gold		Silver		Bronze	
500 meters × 2	(South Korea) Lee Sang-hwa	77.06 UR	(China) Sheng Xiaomei	78.11	(China) Yu Jing	78.35
1000 metres	(Russia) Yuliya Skokova	1:17.33 UR	(Japan) Nao Kodaira	1:17.92	(Poland) Katarzyna Wójcicka	1:17.33
1500 metres	(Poland) Katarzyna Wójcicka	2:00.69 UR	(South Korea) Lee Ju-youn	2:00.78	(Netherlands) Moniek Kleinsman	2:02.32
3000 metres	(Austria) Anna Rokita	4:12.33 UR	(Poland) Katarzyna Wójcicka	4:12.68	(South Korea) Lee Ju-youn	4:13.45
5000 metres	(Austria) Anna Rokita	7:14.72 UR	(Netherlands) Moniek Kleinsman	7:17.15	(South Korea) Lee Ju-youn	7:20.37
Team pursuit	Netherlands (NED); Janneke Ensing; Moniek Kleinsman; Diane Valkenburg	3:06.55 UR	Russia (RUS); Yuliya Skokova; Yekaterina Shikhova; Lada Zadonskaya; Yekaterina Malysheva	3:09.40	Japan (JPN); Eri Natori; Shoko Fujimura; Minami Kawasaki; Miyako Sumiyoshi	3:10.36

== Results ==
=== Men's 5000 metres ===
Pos.	Athlete	Time	Gap
1st place, gold medalist(s)	(Netherlands) Mark Ooijevaar	6:32.71	0.00
2nd place, silver medalist(s)	(Russia) Ivan Skobrev	6:34.97	+ 2.26
3rd place, bronze medalist(s)	(Russia) Andrey Burlyaev	6:36.02	+ 3.31
4.	(Russia) Alexey Yunin	6:37.58	+ 4.87
5.	(South Korea) Kim Myung-seok	6:38.48	+ 5.77
6.	(Netherlands) Ben Jongejan	6:40.18	+ 7.47
7.	(Italy) Matteo Anesi	6:42.48	+ 9.77
8.	(Japan) Teppei Mori	6:43.13	+ 10.42
9.	(Netherlands) Ralph de Haan	6:44.66	+ 11.95
10.	(Japan) Seitaro Otoge	6:44.76	+ 12.05

=== Women's 1500 metres ===
Pos.	Athlete	Time	Gap
1st place, gold medalist(s)	(Poland) Katarzyna Wojcicka	2:00.69	0.00
2nd place, silver medalist(s)	(South Korea) Lee Ju-youn	2:00.78	+ 0.09
3rd place, bronze medalist(s)	(Netherlands) Moniek Kleinsman	2:02.32	+ 1.63
4.	(Netherlands) Janneke Ensing	2:02.78	+ 2.09
5.	(Netherlands) Diane Valkenburg	2:03.33	+ 2.64
6.	(China) Xu Jinjin	2:03.80	+ 3.11
7.	(Poland) Luiza Złotkowska	2:03.83	+ 3.14
8.	(Russia) Yuliya Skokova	2:04.49	+ 3.80
9.	(Japan) Nao Kodaira	2:04.58	+ 3.89
10.	(Netherlands) Jorien Kranenborg	2:04.91	+ 4.22
