= Li Changyu =

Li Changyu may refer to:

- Henry Lee (forensic scientist) (born 1938), Taiwanese American forensic scientist
- Li Changyu (speed skater) (born 1983), Chinese speed skater
