= Margaret Crowley =

Margaret Crowley may refer to:

- Margaret Crowley (speed skater) (born 1986), Olympic speed skater from the United States
- Margaret Crowley (runner) (born 1967), retired Australian runner
