= Lee Jin-woo (speed skater) =

South Korean speed skater

Personal information
- Nationality: South Korean
- Born: 12 June 1986 (age 39)

Korean name
- Hangul: 이진우
- RR: I Jinu
- MR: I Chinu

Sport
- Sport: Speed skating

Lee Jin-woo (Korean: 이진우; born 12 June 1986) is a South Korean speed skater. He competed in the men's 1500 metres event at the 2006 Winter Olympics.
