= Speed skating at the 2006 Winter Olympics – Men's 1500 metres =

Speed skating at the Olympics

Men's 1500 metres at the XX Olympic Winter Games
- Pictogram for speed skating
- Venue: Oval Lingotto
- Dates: 21 February 2006
- Competitors: 41 from 14 nations
- Winning time: 1:45.97

Medalists
1st place, gold medalist(s)		Enrico Fabris	Italy
2nd place, silver medalist(s)		Shani Davis	United States
3rd place, bronze medalist(s)		Chad Hedrick	United States

The men's 1500 m speed skating competition for the 2006 Winter Olympics was held in Turin, Italy.

== Records ==
Prior to this competition, the existing world and Olympic records were as follows.

World record	Chad Hedrick (USA)	1:42.78	Salt Lake City, United States	18 November 2005
Olympic record	Derek Parra (USA)	1:43.95	Salt Lake City, United States	19 February 2002

No new world or Olympic records were set during this competition.

== Results ==
Rank	Pair	Lane	Name	Country	Time	Time behind	Notes
Gold medal	17	I	Enrico Fabris	Italy	1:45.97		
Silver medal	21	O	Shani Davis	United States	1:46.13	+0.16	
Bronze medal	20	I	Chad Hedrick	United States	1:46.22	+0.25	
4	17	O	Simon Kuipers	Netherlands	1:46.58	+0.61	
5	18	O	Erben Wennemars	Netherlands	1:46.71	+0.74	
6	14	O	Ivan Skobrev	Russia	1:46.91	+0.94	
7	16	O	Petter Andersen	Norway	1:47.15	+1.18	
8	15	I	Mikael Flygind Larsen	Norway	1:47.28	+1.31	
9	15	O	Joey Cheek	United States	1:47.52	+1.55	
10	14	I	Even Wetten	Norway	1:47.78	+1.81	
11	18	I	Denny Morrison	Canada	1:48.04	+2.07	
12	11	O	Konrad Niedźwiedzki	Poland	1:48.09	+2.12	
12	19	O	Steven Elm	Canada	1:48.09	+2.12	
14	8	I	Lee Jong-woo	South Korea	1:48.11	+2.14	
15	7	I	Sven Kramer	Netherlands	1:48.36	+2.39	
16	5	O	Mun Jun	South Korea	1:48.38	+2.41	
17	4	I	Arne Dankers	Canada	1:48.42	+2.45	
18	3	I	Ippolito Sanfratello	Italy	1:48.44	+2.47	
19	19	I	Derek Parra	United States	1:48.54	+2.57	
20	16	I	Jan Bos	Netherlands	1:48.61	+2.64	
21	9	I	Dmitry Shepel	Russia	1:48.74	+2.77	
22	6	O	Stefano Donagrandi	Italy	1:48.85	+2.88	
23	20	I	Yevgeny Lalenkov	Russia	1:49.00	+3.03	
24	13	I	Teruhiro Sugimori	Japan	1:49.51	+3.54	
24	13	O	Risto Rosendahl	Finland	1:49.51	+3.54	
26	2	O	Stefan Heythausen	Germany	1:49.58	+3.61	
27	7	O	Justin Warsylewicz	Canada	1:49.77	+3.80	
28	12	O	Lee Jin-woo	South Korea	1:49.85	+3.88	
29	2	I	Matteo Anesi	Italy	1:49.88	+3.91	
30	1	I	Gao Xuefeng	China	1:49.91	+3.94	
31	6	I	Tobias Schneider	Germany	1:50.18	+4.21	
32	21	I	Aleksandr Kibalko	Russia	1:50.29	+4.32	
33	3	O	Johan Röjler	Sweden	1:50.50	+4.53	
34	12	I	Yusuke Imai	Japan	1:50.56	+4.59	
35	10	O	Takahiro Ushiyama	Japan	1:50.59	+4.62	
36	8	O	Robert Lehmann	Germany	1:51.04	+5.07	
37	5	I	Jörg Dallmann	Germany	1:51.32	+5.35	
38	10	I	Takaharu Nakajima	Japan	1:51.61	+5.64	
39	4	O	Aleksey Belyayev	Kazakhstan	1:52.20	+6.23	
40	9	O	Li Changyu	China	1:53.32	+7.35	
	9	I	Håvard Bøkko	Norway	DNF		
