= Aleksey Belyayev =

Kazakhstani speed skater (born 1985)

Personal information
- Nationality: Kazakhstani
- Born: 20 February 1985 (age 41) Pavlodar, Kazakhstan

Sport
- Sport: Speed skating

Aleksey Belyayev (Алексей Валерьевич Беляев, born 20 February 1985) is a Kazakhstani speed skater. He competed in the men's 1500 metres event at the 2006 Winter Olympics.
