= Speed skating at the 2011 Asian Winter Games – Women's 5000 metres =

Women's 5000 metres at the 2011 Asian Winter Games
- Venue: Alau Ice Palace
- Dates: 5 February 2011
- Competitors: 7 from 4 nations

Medalists
gold medal	Masako Hozumi	Japan
silver medal	Park Do-yeong	South Korea
bronze medal	Eriko Ishino	Japan

The women's 5000 metres event will be held February 5. 7 athletes participated. The final was held from 15:05–15:39.

== Schedule ==
All times are Almaty Time (UTC+06:00)

Date	Time	Event
Saturday, 5 February 2011	15:05	Final

== Records ==
Prior to this competition, the existing world and Games records were as follows.

World Record	Martina Sáblíková (CZE)	6:45.61	Salt Lake City, United States	11 March 2007
Games Record	—	—	—	—

== Results ==
Rank	Pair	Athlete	Time	Notes
1st place, gold medalist(s)	3	Masako Hozumi (JPN)	7:09.23	GR
2nd place, silver medalist(s)	3	Park Do-yeong (KOR)	7:15.63	
3rd place, bronze medalist(s)	4	Eriko Ishino (JPN)	7:16.64	
4	1	Kim Bo-reum (KOR)	7:22.92	
5	2	Chang Chao (CHN)	7:30.35	
6	4	Wang Jianlu (CHN)	8:02.61	
7	2	Yelena Urvantseva (KAZ)	8:03.16	
