= Zheng Qing =

Chinese water polo player

Personal information
- Nationality: Chinese
- Born: 15 September 1959 (age 65)

Sport
- Sport: Water polo

Zheng Qing (born 15 September 1959) is a Chinese water polo player. He competed in the men's tournament at the 1988 Summer Olympics.
