= Natalya Rybakova =

Kazakhstani speed skater

Personal information
- Nationality: Kazakhstani
- Born: 24 June 1981 (age 45) Petropavl, Soviet Union

Sport
- Sport: Speed skating

Natalya Rybakova (born 24 June 1981) is a Kazakhstani speed skater. She competed in the women's 3000 metres at the 2006 Winter Olympics.
