= Kristine Holzer =

American speed skater

Kristine L. Holzer (born March 21, 1974) is an American Olympic speed skater.

Diagnosed with juvenile rheumatoid arthritis (JRA) when she was 13 years old, Holzer originally took up rowing at Gonzaga University because the sport was low-impact. Despite her difficult past, Holzer excelled at rowing and upon graduation moved to Augusta, Georgia to train with the United States Sculling squad under the watchful eye of Coach Igor Grinko. Holzer remained in Augusta for two summers, where due to the combination of her small stature, almost frightening work ethic, and surprising speed on the water, she earned the nickname "Pocket Rocket." Kristine's rowing career peaked at the 1998 United States Senior National Team Trials, where she finished second in the women's double sculls. After being snubbed for a spot as a spare in the 1998 World Rowing Championships, Kristine decided to take up speedskating at the age of 24 (despite having only skated once in her life).

After narrowly missing a spot on the 2002 Winter Olympic squad, Holzer skated at the 2006 Winter Olympics and finished in 27th place in the 3000 meters.

Personal records
Women's speed skating
Event	Result	Date	Location	Notes
500 m	41.52	2005-01-08	Salt Lake City, Utah	
1000 m	1:20.18	2005-01-15	Salt Lake City, Utah	
1500 m	1:58.24	2005-01-09	Salt Lake City, Utah	
3000 m	4:08.46	2005-11-18	Salt Lake City, Utah	
5000 m	7:11.31	2005-12-31	Salt Lake City, Utah	
