= Lee Ju-yeon =

South Korean speed skater (born 1987)

Personal information
- Born: 29 October 1987 (age 38) South Korea
- Height: 1.67 m (5 ft 5 1/2 in)
- Weight: 49 kg (108 lb; 7.7 st)

Sport
- Country: South Korea
- Sport: Speed skating
Medal record
Representing South Korea
Women's speed skating
World Junior Championships
Bronze medal – third place	2006 Erfurt	All Around
Winter Universiade
Silver medal – second place	2007 Torino	1500 m
Silver medal – second place	2009 Harbin	Team pursuit
Bronze medal – third place	2007 Torino	3000 m
Bronze medal – third place	2007 Torino	5000 m
Asian Winter Games
Gold medal – first place	2011 Astana-Almaty	Team pursuit
Silver medal – second place	2007 Changchun	1500 m
Bronze medal – third place	2011 Astana-Almaty	Mass start

Lee Ju-yeon (Korean: 이주연, sometimes rendered Lee Ju-youn; born 29 October 1987) is a South Korean speed skater. She represented her country at the 2006 and 2010 editions of the Winter Olympics. She won the silver medal at the 2007 Asian Winter Games that regional winter sports competition in Asia.

== Personal records ==
Personal records
Women's speed skating
Event	Result	Date	Location	Notes
500 m	40.38	10 March 2006	(Germany); Erfurt	
1000 m	1:17.92	19 November 2005	(United States); Salt Lake City	
1500 m	1:57.09	17 November 2007	(Canada); Calgary	
3000 m	4.05.64	16 November 2007	(Canada); Calgary	National record
5000 m	7:18.85	22 November 2008	(Russia); Moscow	
