= Svetlana Vysokova =

Russian speed skater

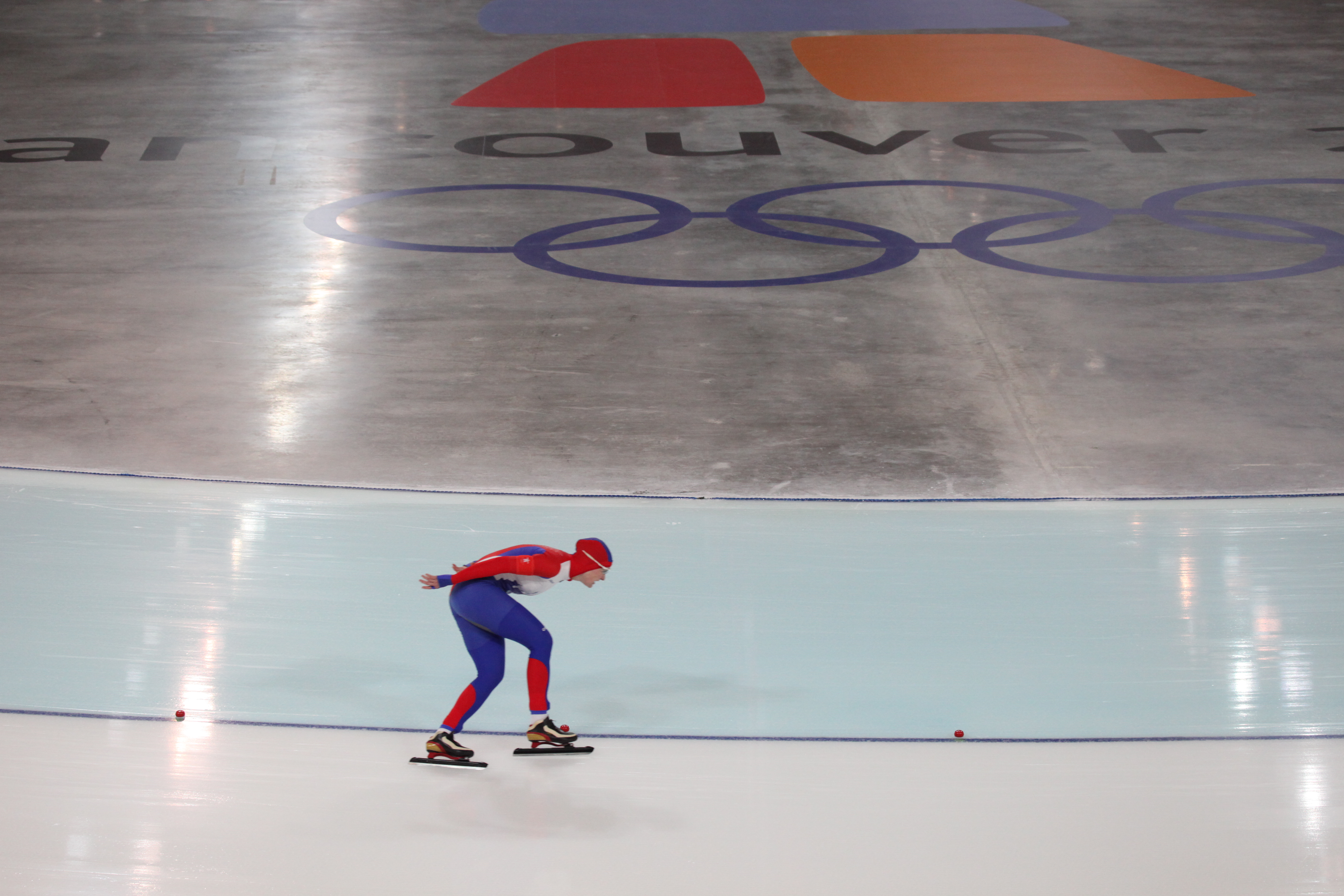

Personal information
- Born: 12 May 1972 (age 54) Krasnokamsk, Soviet Union
- Height: 1.70 m (5 ft 7 in)
- Weight: 67 kg (148 lb)

Sport
- Country: Russia
- Sport: Speed skating
Medal record
Representing Russia
Olympic Games
Bronze medal – third place	2006 Turin	Team Pursuit

Svetlana Yuryevna Vysokova (Russian: Светлана Юрьевна Высокова; born 12 May 1972) is a Russian speed skater, who won a bronze medal in the Women's Team Pursuit at the 2006 Winter Olympics.
