= Fu Chunyan =

Chinese speed skater (born 1989)

Personal information
- Born: December 28, 1989 (age 36) Qiqihar, Heilongjiang, China

Sport
- Country: China
- Sport: Speed skating
- Event(s): 3000 m, Team pursuit
Medal record
Universiade
Gold medal – first place	2009 Harbin	3000 m
Asian Winter Games
Silver medal – second place	2011 Astana-Almaty	Team pursuit

Fu Chunyan (simplified Chinese: 付春艳; traditional Chinese: 付春艷; pinyin: Fù Chūnyàn; born December 28, 1989, in Qiqihar, Heilongjiang) is a Chinese female speed skater.

She competed for China at the 2010 Winter Olympics in the 3000 m event.
