= Sławomir Chmura =

Polish speed skater

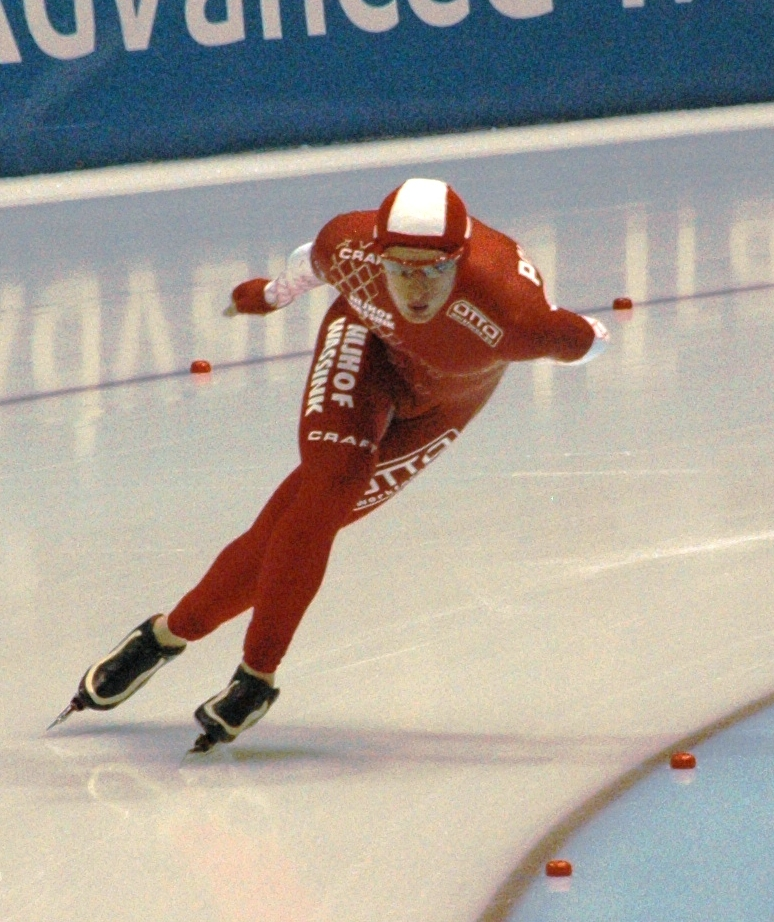
- Sławomir Chmura in 2010

Personal information
- Born: 5 November 1983 (age 42) Warsaw, Poland

Sport
- Country: Poland
- Sport: Speed skating

Sławomir Chmura (born 5 November 1983) is a Polish long track speed skater who participates in international competitions. He has been the Polish national champion in the 10,000-meter in 2007.

== Personal records ==
Personal records
Men's speed skating
Event	Result	Date	Location	Notes
500 m	38.20	24 February 2007	Olympic Oval, Calgary	
1000 m	1:14.02	24 February 2007	Olympic Oval, Calgary	
1500 m	1:52.07	13 January 2007	Ice Rink Ritten, Collalbo	
3000 m	3:48.14	5 November 2005	Olympic Oval, Calgary	
5000 m	6:23.99	12 December 2009	Utah Olympic Oval, Salt Lake City	
10000 m	13:27.25	19 February 2011	Utah Olympic Oval, Salt Lake City	

=== Career highlights ===
European Allround Championships
2007 – Collalbo, 21st
2008 – Kolomna, 27th
2009 – Heerenveen, 21st
National Championships
2007 – Warsaw, (silver) 2nd at 5000 m
2007 – Warsaw, (bronze) 3rd at 1000 m
2007 – Warsaw, (gold) 1st at 10000 m
European Youth-23 Games
2006 – Innsbruck, (silver) 2nd at 10000 m
