= Adelia Marra =

Italian speed skater

Personal information
- Nationality: Italian
- Born: 1 March 1979 (age 47) Como, Italy

Sport
- Sport: Speed skating

Adelia Marra (born 1 March 1979) is an Italian speed skater. She competed in two events at the 2006 Winter Olympics.
