= Lee So-yeon (speed skater) =

South Korean speed skater

Personal information
- Born: July 1985 (age 40)

Sport
- Country: South Korea
- Sport: Speed skating

Lee So-yeon (Korean: 이소연; born July 1985) is a South Korean former long track speed skater.

So-yeon represented her nation at international competitions. As a junior she participated at the 2002 World Junior Speed Skating Championships, winning the silver medal in the team pursuit. She made at elite level her ISU Speed Skating World Cup debut during the 2007–08 ISU Speed Skating World Cup season. She competed in 6 World Cup races, including one in the A-division. in Salt Lake City in the 3000 metres. At the 2008 Asian Single Distance Championships she won the bronze medal in the 5000 metres.

Between 2001 and 2010 she had 31 starts at national championships. She became twice national champion at the 2002 and 2007 South Korean Single Distance Championships in the 3000 metres and 5000 metres respectively. Furthermore, she won 11 silver and 4 bronze medals at national championships.

== Records ==
=== Personal records ===
Personal records
Women's speed skating
Event	Result	Date	Location	Notes
500 m	41,69	14.08.2010	Calgary	
1000 m	1.21,40	14.08.2010	Calgary	
1500 m	2.00,14	17.11.2007	Calgary	
3000 m	4.11,89	16.11.2007	Calgary	
5000 m	7.32,15	21.01.2007	Turin	
