= Li Changyu (speed skater) =

Chinese speed skater

Personal information
- Native name: 李长宇 (Lǐ Chángyǔ)
- Nationality: Chinese
- Born: 19 July 1983 (age 41)

Sport
- Sport: Speed skating

Li Changyu (born 19 July 1983) is a Chinese former speed skater. He competed in the men's 1500 metres event at the 2006 Winter Olympics. He retired in 2009.
