= Hedvig Bjelkevik =

Norwegian speed skater

Hedvig Bjelkevik (born 18 April 1981) is a Norwegian speed skater. She was born in Arendal and is the sister of Annette Bjelkevik. She competed in the 1,500 metres and team pursuit at the 2006 Winter Olympics in Turin.

She won several national titles in speed skating: Allround and 5000m in 2000, allround in 2003 and 2004, sprint and 1000m in 2007, and sprint, 500m and 1000m in 2008.
