= Heilongjiang Indoor Rink =

Ice skating rink in Harbin, China

Coordinates: 45°46′50″N 126°39′54″E

Heilongjiang Indoor Rink is an indoor ice skating arena in Harbin in Heilongjiang in north east China. The arena was opened on 18 November 1995. It was the first indoor arena for speed skating in Asia. The rink was built at the same place where an old outdoor skating rink was situated. The old rink was inaugurated in 1955. The rink is situated 141 m above sea level.

The 1996 Asian Winter Games was the first major event held in the arena. With a 400 m-long (1,300 ft) track, it was regularly used for the Speed Skating World Cup.
