= Maria Lamb =

American speed skater

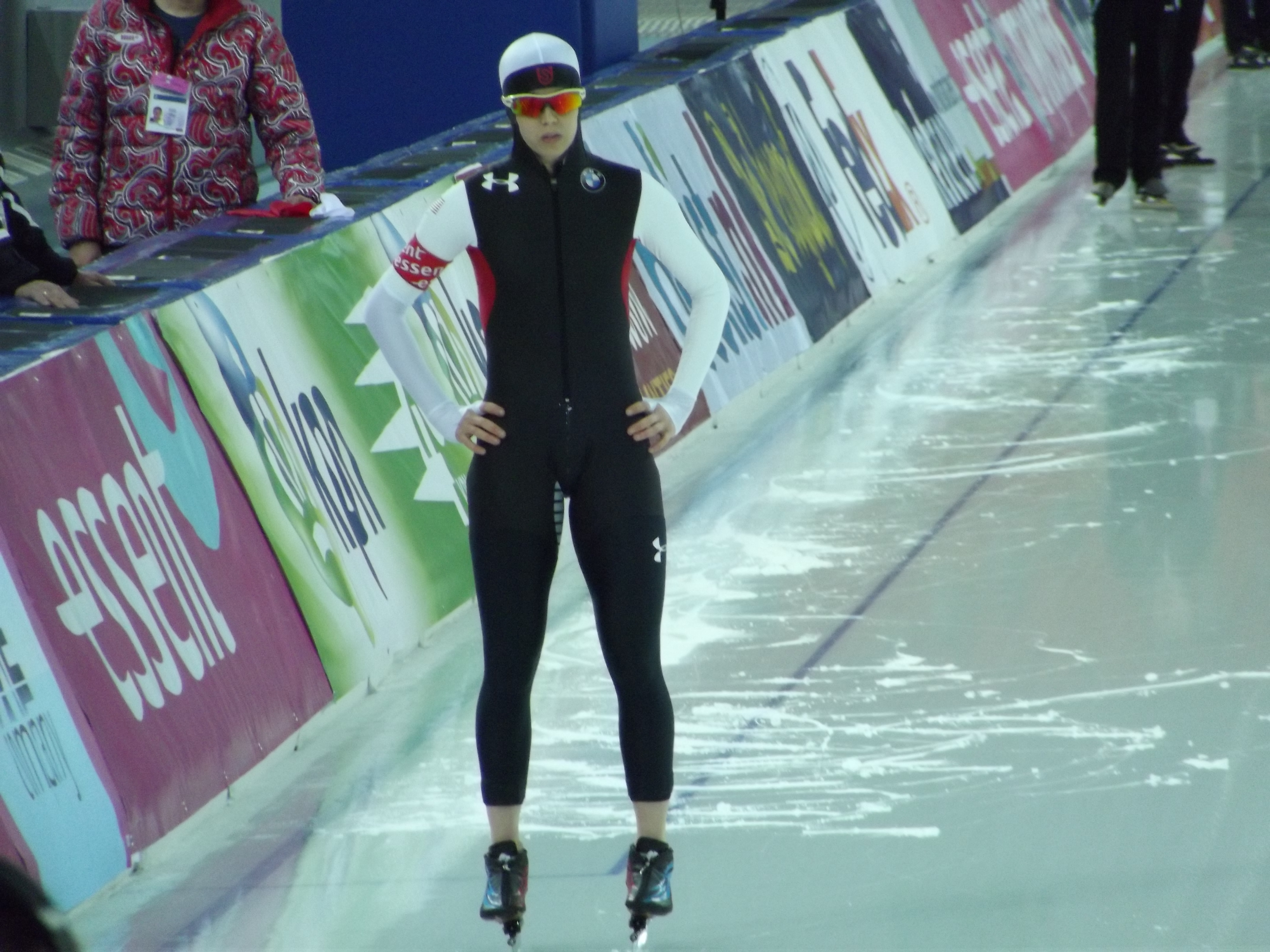

Personal information
- Born: January 4, 1986 (age 40) St. Paul, Minnesota

Sport
- Country: United States
- Sport: Speed skating

Maria Lamb (born January 4, 1986) is an Olympic speed skater from River Falls, Wisconsin, who competed in the 1,500 meter race and the team pursuit at the 2006 Winter Olympics. She was also selected to compete in the 5000 m for the US at the 2010 and 2014 Winter Olympics.

Personal records
Women's speed skating
Event	Result	Date	Location	Notes
500 m	39.29	December 27, 2005	Utah Olympic Oval, Salt Lake City	
1000 m	1:17.34	December 31, 2005	Utah Olympic Oval, Salt Lake City	
1500 m	1:58.03	December 30, 2005	Utah Olympic Oval, Salt Lake City	
3000 m	4:08.90	November 18, 2005	Utah Olympic Oval, Salt Lake City	
5000 m	7:09.62	December 30, 2009	Utah Olympic Oval, Salt Lake City	
10000 m	16:02.01	March 21, 2003	Olympic Oval, Calgary	
