= Margaret Crowley (speed skater) =

American speed skater

Margaret Crowley (born March 17, 1986, in Saint Paul, Minnesota) is an Olympic speed skater from the United States, who competed in 3000 m and the team pursuit at the 2006 Winter Olympics.

Personal records
Women's speed skating
Event	Result	Date	Location	Notes
500 m	40.70	2005-12-27	Salt Lake City, Utah	
1000 m	1:20.94	2005-01-29	Salt Lake City, Utah	
1500 m	1:58.09	2005-12-30	Salt Lake City, Utah	
3000 m	4:05.69	2005-11-11	Calgary	
5000 m	7:54.57	2004-12-18	Milwaukee, Wisconsin	

Margaret ("Maggie") Crowley grew up in the Chicago area and attended Northwestern University for college.

After the Olympics, Crowley worked in New York City before attending Harvard Business School (Class of 2014).

She currently works as a product manager at Drift.

== Employment ==
For two years, Maggie was a product manager at TripAdvisor.
