= Zhang Xiaolei =

Chinese speed skater

Personal information
- Nationality: Chinese
- Born: 12 January 1983 (age 42); Jilin, China

Sport
- Sport: Speed skating

Zhang Xiaolei (born 12 January 1983) is a Chinese speed skater. She competed at the 2002 Winter Olympics and the 2006 Winter Olympics.
