= Catherine Raney-Norman =

American speed skater

Catherine Raney Norman
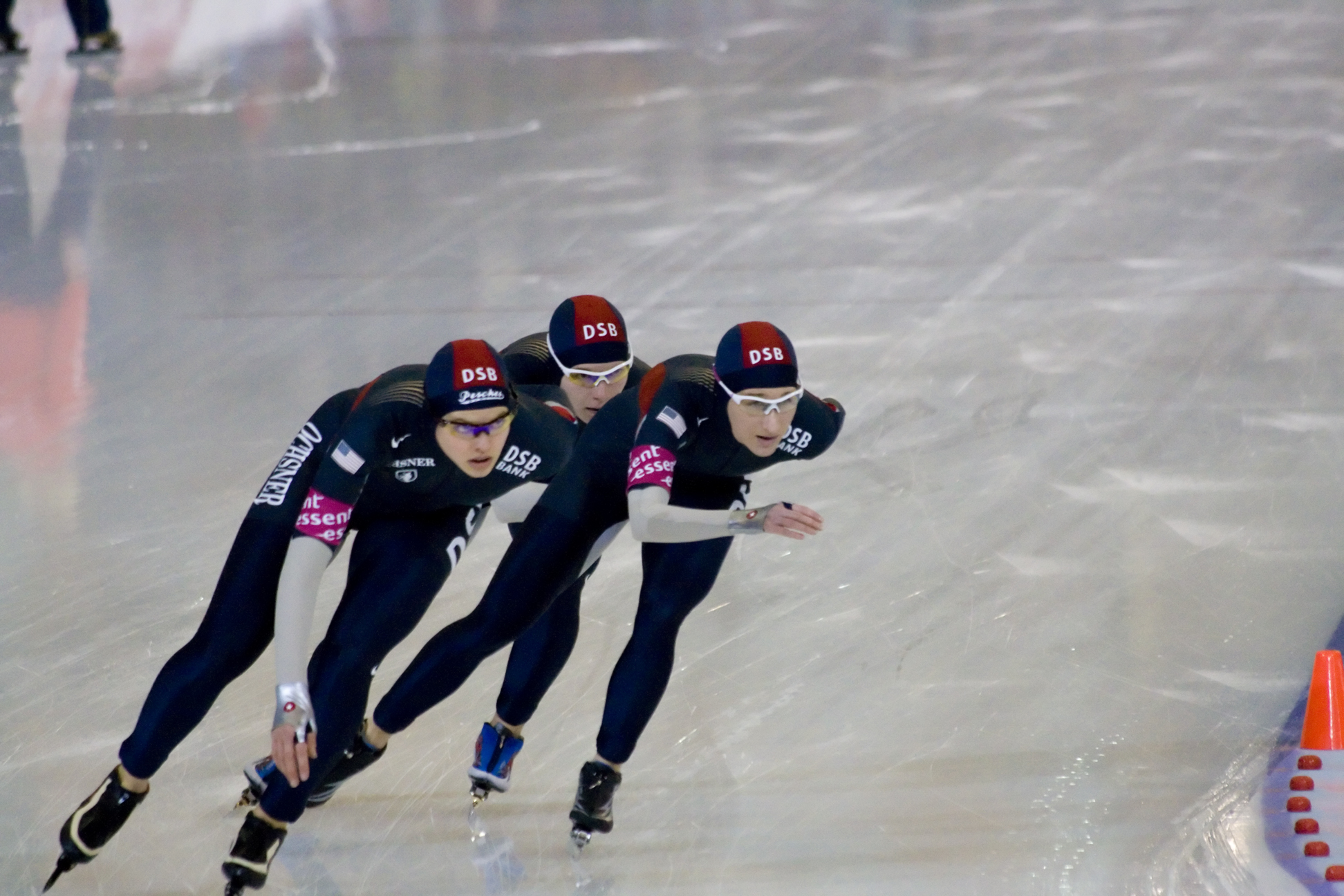
- Catherine Raney Norman at the back with Nancy Swider-Peltz, Jr making way for Jennifer Rodriguez in a Team Pursuit event in 2009.

Personal information
- Born: Catherine Raney; June 20, 1980 (age 46) Nashville, Tennessee
- Spouse: Marc Norman

Sport
- Country: United States
- Sport: Speed skating

Catherine Raney Norman (born June 20, 1980 in Nashville, Tennessee) is a four-time Olympic speed skater from Elm Grove, Wisconsin who competed in the 1998 Winter Olympics, 2002 Winter Olympics, 2006 Winter Olympics and 2010 Winter Olympics. She served as chair of the Salt Lake City-Utah Committee for the Games, which unsuccessfully sought to bring the Olympics and Paralympics back to Utah in 2030, and is pursuing a 2034 bid.

Raney Norman won the U.S. Allround Championship six times and held three U.S. records. She was the silver medalist in the 1999 World Junior Championships in all around. She was inducted into the U.S. Speed Skating Hall of Fame in 2018.

Since retiring from speed skating, she has focused on service to Olympic and Paralympic sport. In 2012, she was appointed by Utah Governor Gary Herbert as an athlete member of an exploratory committee to investigate a future Olympic and Paralympic Winter Games for the state. In February, 2020, she was named to the inaugural Salt Lake City-Utah Committee for the Games as an athlete board member and co-chair of the Athletes' Advisory Committee with Paralympian Chris Waddell. She is vice chair of the Utah Olympic Legacy Foundation (formerly known at Utah Athletic Foundation), where she joined as a board member in 2011. She was named to chair the committee on June 9, 2021.

Personal records
Women's speed skating
Event	Result	Date	Location	Notes
500 m	41.05	2005-12-27	Salt Lake City, Utah	
1000 m	1:19.08	2005-12-31	Salt Lake City, Utah	
1500 m	1:57.34	2005-12-30	Salt Lake City, Utah	
3000 m	4:01.98	2005-11-18	Calgary	
5000 m	6:56.91	2005-12-28	Salt Lake City, Utah	
10000 m	14:56.12	2005-12-31	Calgary	
