= Hiromi Ōtsu =

Japanese speed skater (born 1984)

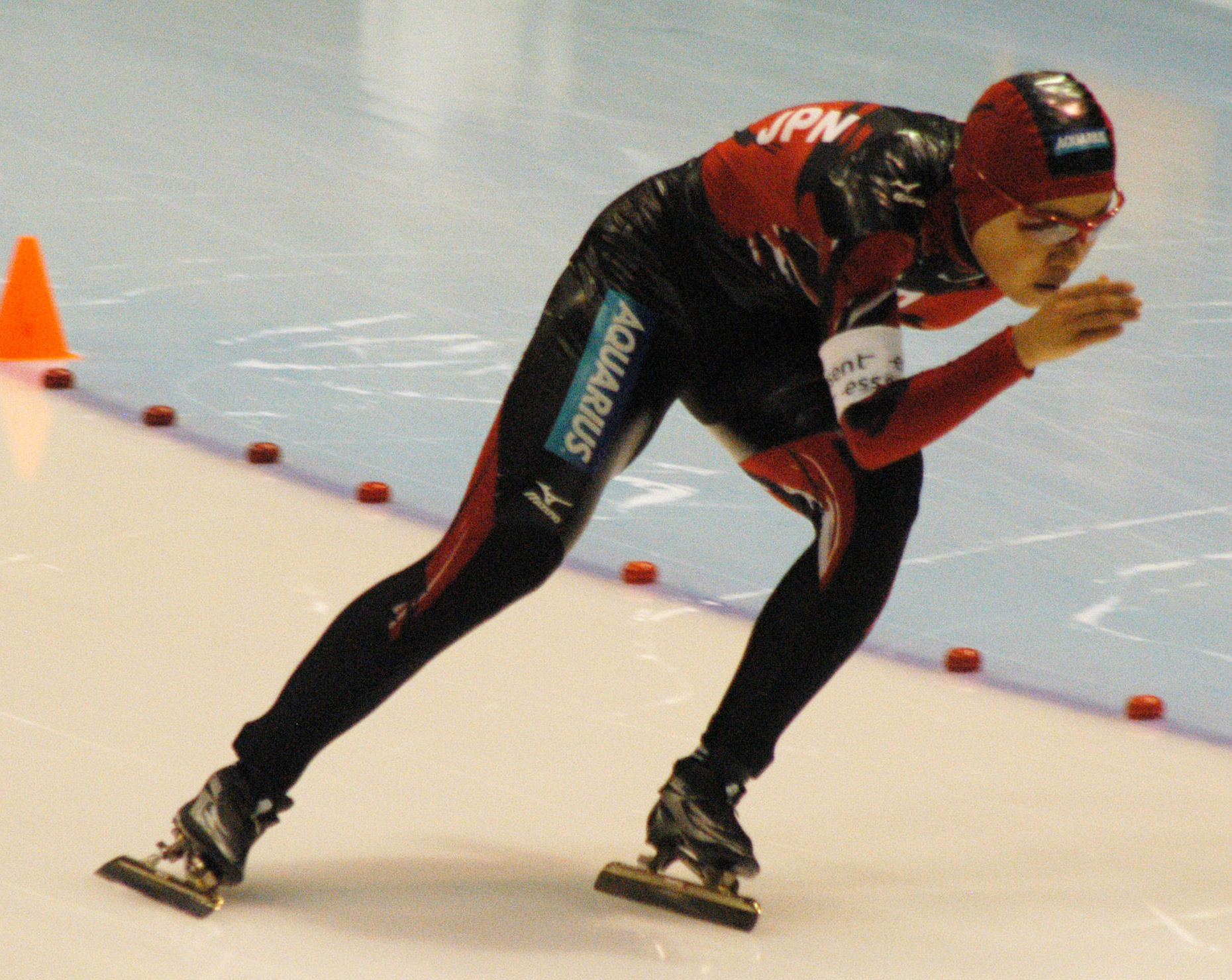
Hiromi Otsu

Hiromi Ōtsu (大津 広美, Ōtsu Hiromi, born 22 May 1984) is a Japanese speed skater.

== Early life ==
She was born on 22 May 1984 in Sarabetsu, Hokkaido, Japan.

== Career ==
Otsu competed in the 2006 Winter Olympics in Torino, in the Women's 1,500 metres, and the Women's Team Pursuit (6 laps).
