= Anna Rokita =

Austrian speed skater

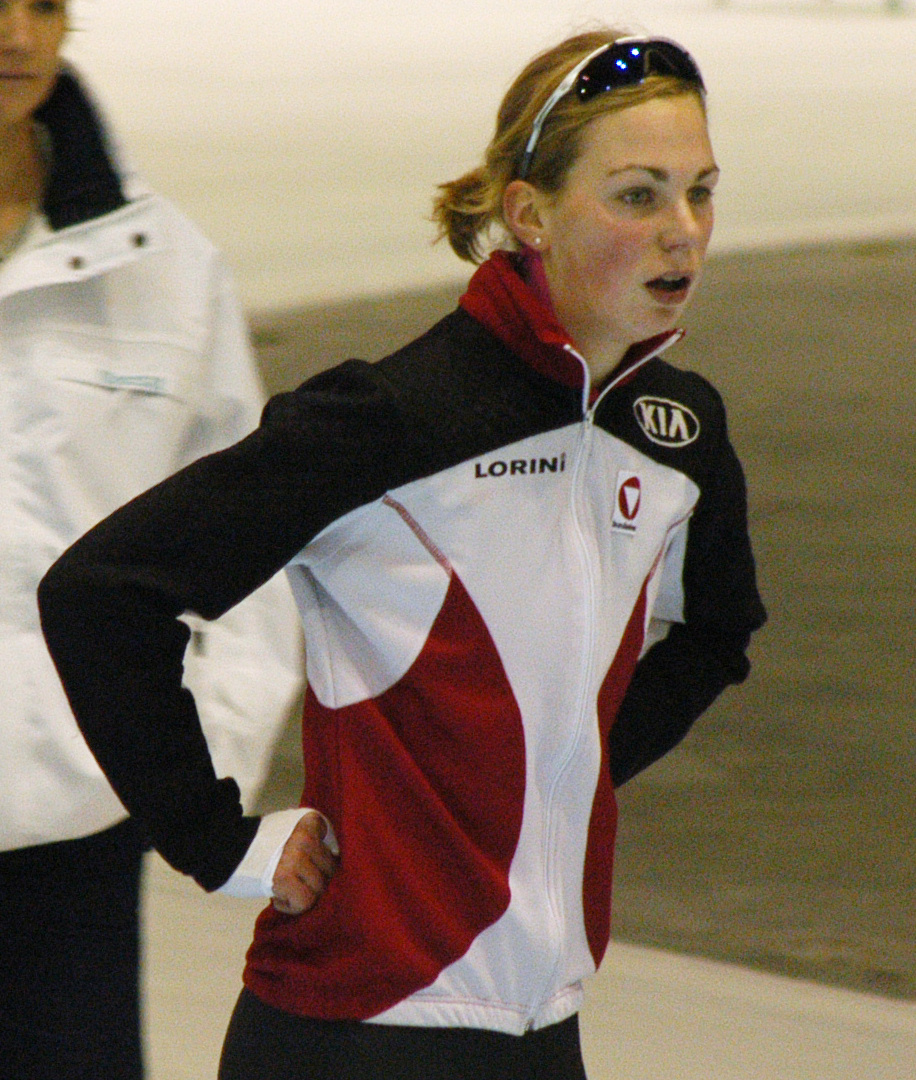
Anna Rokita at the European Allround Speed Skating Championship in 2009

Anna Rokita (born 30 January 1986) is an Austrian long track speed skater who participates in international competitions. She is the daughter of Polish speed skater Jerzy Rokita.

== Personal records ==
Personal records
Women's speed skating
Event	Result	Date	Location	Notes
500 m	40.63	28 November 2009	Calgary	
1000 m	1:17.95	13 December 2009	Salt Lake City	
1500 m	1:58.25	12 December 2009	Salt Lake City	
3000 m	4:05.17	12 November 2005	Calgary	Current Austrian record
5000 m	7:11.72	1 December 2007	Kolomna	Current Austrian record

=== Career highlights ===
Olympic Winter Games
2006 – Australia, 16th at 3000 m
2006 – Australia, 27th at 1500 m
2006 – Turin, 12th at 5000 m
World Allround Championships
2006 – Calgary, 22nd
World Single Distance Championships
2005 – Inzell, 20th at 1500 m
2005 – Inzell, 17th at 3000 m
European Allround Championships
2005 – Heerenveen, 15th
2006 – Hamar, 15th
2007 – Collalbo, 15th
2008 – Kolomna, 15th
World Junior Allround Championships
2001 – Groningen, 24th
2002 – Collalbo, 13th
2003 – Kushiro, 5th
2004 – Roseville, 18th
2005 – Seinäjoki, 8th
National Championships
2001 – Innsbruck, (bronze) 3rd at allround
2003 – Innsbruck, (silver) 2nd at allround
2003 – Innsbruck, (gold) 1st at sprint
2004 – Inzell, (gold) 1st at allround
2004 – Collalbo, (gold) 1st at sprint
2005 – Innsbruck, (gold) 1st at sprint
Nordic Junior Games
2004 – Berlin, (bronze) 3rd at 1000 m
Winter Universiade
2005 – Innsbruck, (silver) 2nd at 5000 m
