= Annette Bjelkevik =

Norwegian speed skater

Personal information
- Born: 12 May 1978 (age 46); Arendal, Norway

Sport
- Sport: Speed skating

Annette Bjelkevik (born 12 May 1978) is a Norwegian speed skater. She was born in Arendal and is the sister of Hedvig Bjelkevik. She competed in the 1,500 m, 3,000 m and team pursuit at the 2006 Winter Olympics in Turin.

She won several national titles in speed skating: 1000m in 2000, allround, 1000m and 1500m in 2001, 1000m and 1500m in 2003, 1500m and 3000m in 2004, 500m, 1000m and 1500m in 2005, sprint, 500m and 1000m in 2006, and 500m in 2007.
