= Ji Jia =

Chinese speed skater

Personal information
- Nationality: Chinese
- Born: 22 January 1985 (age 41) Jilin, China

Sport
- Sport: Speed skating
- Event(s): 500 m, 1000 m, 1500 m
Medal record
Asian Winter Games
| Silver medal – second place | 2011 Astana-Almaty | Team pursuit |
| Bronze medal – third place | 2007 Changchun | 1500 m |
Winter Universiade
| Bronze medal – third place | 2009 Harbin | 1500 m |

Ji Jia (born 22 January 1985) is a Chinese speed skater. She competed in three events at the 2006 Winter Olympics.
