= Eriko Ishino =

Japanese speed skater (born 1985)

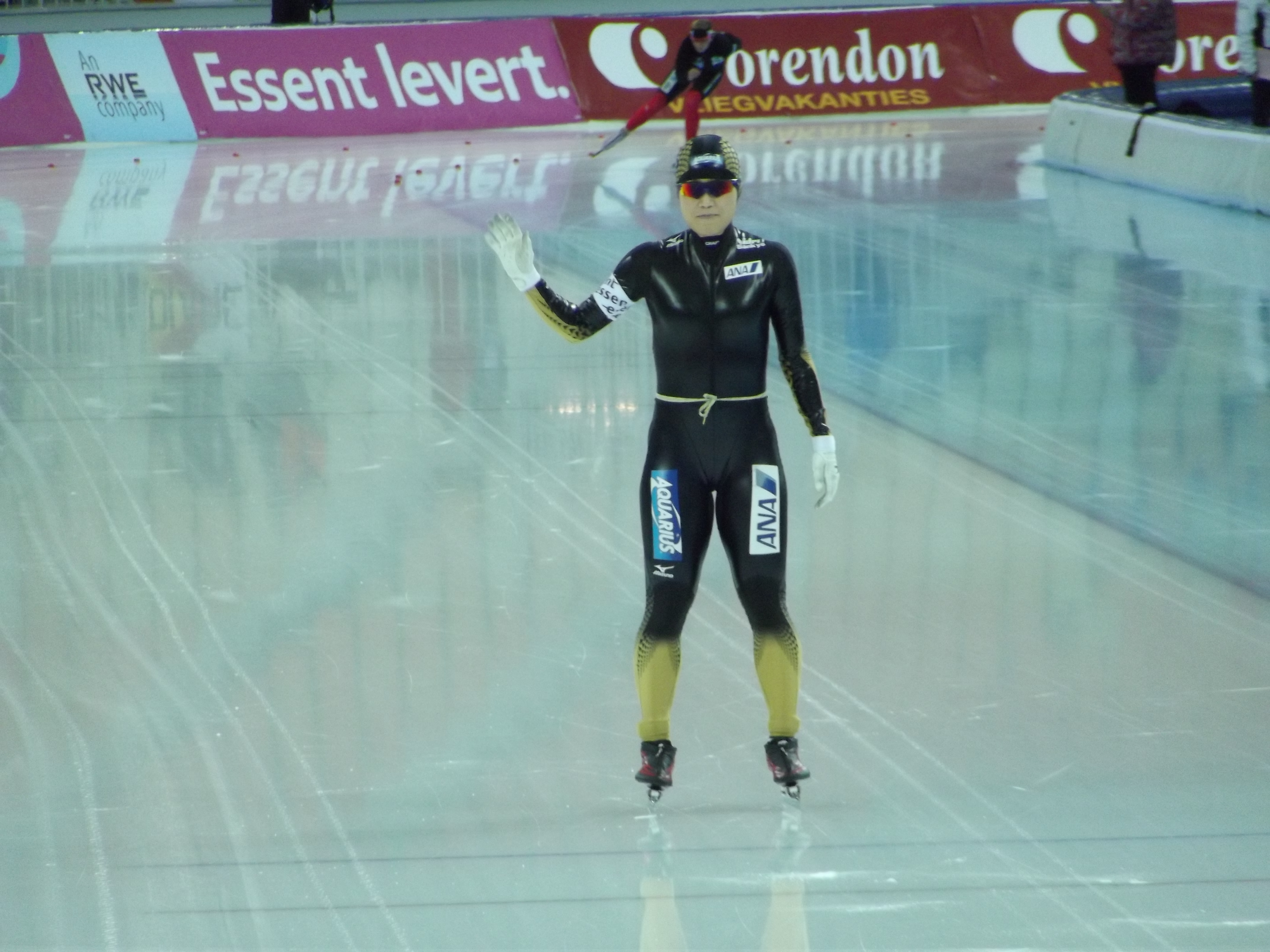
- Eriko Ishino in 2013

Personal information
- Nationality: Japanese
- Born: 1 December 1985 (age 40) Obihiro, Hokkaido, Japan

Sport
- Country: Japan
- Sport: Speed skating
Medal record
Asian Winter Games
Bronze medal – third place	2003 Changchun	3000 m
Bronze medal – third place	2011 Astana/Almaty	5000 m

Eriko Ishino (Japanese: 石野 枝里子, Hepburn: Ishino Eriko; born 1 December 1985) is a Japanese speed skater. She competed in four events at the 2006 Winter Olympics.
