= Wang Fei (speed skater) =

Chinese speed skater

Wang Fei (Chinese: 王霏; pinyin: Wáng Fēi; born February 20, 1982, in Harbin, Heilongjiang) is a Chinese female speed skater.

She competed for China at the 2010 Winter Olympics in the 1500m and 3000m events.
