= World Single Distances Speed Skating Championships for Men =

The International Skating Union has organised the World Single Distances Speed Skating Championships for Men since 1996.

== Locations ==
- 1996: Hamar, Norway
- 1997: Warsaw, Poland
- 1998: Calgary, Canada
- 1999: Heerenveen, Netherlands
- 2000: Nagano, Japan
- 2001: Salt Lake City, United States
- 2002 Not held because of the Winter Olympic Games
- 2003: Berlin, Germany
- 2004: Seoul, South Korea
- 2005: Inzell, Germany
- 2006 Not held because of the Winter Olympic Games
- 2007: Salt Lake City, United States
- 2008: Nagano, Japan
- 2009: Vancouver, Canada
- 2010 Not held because of the Winter Olympic Games
- 2011: Inzell, Germany
- 2012: Heerenveen, Netherlands
- 2013: Sochi, Russia
- 2014 Not held because of the Winter Olympic Games
- 2015: Heerenveen, Netherlands
- 2016: Kolomna, Russia
- 2017: Gangneung, South Korea
- 2018 Not held because of the Winter Olympic Games
- 2019: Inzell, Germany
- 2020: Salt Lake City, United States
- 2021: Heerenveen, Netherlands
- 2022 Not held because of the Winter Olympic Games
- 2023: Heerenveen, Netherlands
- 2024: Calgary, Canada
- 2025: Hamar, Norway

== Medal winners ==
Numbers in brackets denotes number of victories in corresponding disciplines. Boldface denotes record number of victories.

=== 500 m ===
Year	Gold	Silver	Bronze
1996	(Japan) Hiroyasu Shimizu	(Russia) Sergey Klevchenya	(Norway) Roger Strøm
1997	(Japan) Manabu Horii	(Norway) Roger Strøm	(Japan) Hiroyasu Shimizu
1998	(Japan) Hiroyasu Shimizu	(Canada) Sylvain Bouchard	(Canada) Jeremy Wotherspoon
1999	(Japan) Hiroyasu Shimizu	(Netherlands) Erben Wennemars	(Netherlands) Jakko Jan Leeuwangh
2000	(Japan) Hiroyasu Shimizu	(Canada) Mike Ireland	(Canada) Jeremy Wotherspoon
2001	(Japan) Hiroyasu Shimizu **(5)**	(Canada) Jeremy Wotherspoon	(United States) Casey FitzRandolph
2003	(Canada) Jeremy Wotherspoon	(Japan) Hiroyasu Shimizu	(Netherlands) Erben Wennemars
2004	(Canada) Jeremy Wotherspoon	(Russia) Dmitry Lobkov	(Canada) Mike Ireland
2005	(Japan) Joji Kato	(Japan) Hiroyasu Shimizu	(Canada) Jeremy Wotherspoon
2007	(South Korea) Lee Kang-seok	(Japan) Yuya Oikawa	(United States) Tucker Fredricks
2008	(Canada) Jeremy Wotherspoon (3)	(South Korea) Lee Kyou-hyuk	(Japan) Joji Kato
2009	(South Korea) Lee Kang-seok (2)	(South Korea) Lee Kyou-hyuk	(China) Yu Fengtong
2011	(South Korea) Lee Kyou-hyuk	(Japan) Joji Kato	(Netherlands) Jan Smeekens
2012	(South Korea) Mo Tae-bum	(Netherlands) Michel Mulder	(Finland) Pekka Koskela
2013	(South Korea) Mo Tae-bum (2)	(Japan) Joji Kato	(Netherlands) Jan Smeekens
2015	(Russia) Pavel Kulizhnikov	(Netherlands) Michel Mulder	(Canada) Laurent Dubreuil
2016	(Russia) Pavel Kulizhnikov	(Russia) Ruslan Murashov	(Canada) Alex Boisvert-Lacroix
2017	(Netherlands) Jan Smeekens	(Germany) Nico Ihle	(Russia) Ruslan Murashov
2019	(Russia) Ruslan Murashov	(Norway) Håvard Holmefjord Lorentzen	(Russia) Viktor Mushtakov
2020	(Russia) Pavel Kulizhnikov (3)	(Russia) Ruslan Murashov	(Japan) Tatsuya Shinhama
2021	(Canada) Laurent Dubreuil	**RSU** Pavel Kulizhnikov	(Netherlands) Dai Dai N'tab
2023	(United States) Jordan Stolz	(Canada) Laurent Dubreuil	(Japan) Wataru Morishige
2024	(United States) Jordan Stolz (2)	(Canada) Laurent Dubreuil	(Poland) Damian Żurek
2025	(Netherlands) Jenning de Boo	(United States) Jordan Stolz	(United States) Cooper McLeod

Source: schaatsstatistieken.nl

Medal table

Rank	Nation	Gold	Silver	Bronze	Total
1	Japan	7	5	4	16
2	South Korea	5	2	0	7
3	Canada	4	5	6	15
4	Russia	4	4	2	10
5	Netherlands	2	3	5	10
6	United States	2	1	3	6
7	Norway	0	2	1	3
8	Germany	0	1	0	1
8	Russian Skating Union	0	1	0	1
10	China	0	0	1	1
10	Finland	0	0	1	1
10	Poland	0	0	1	1
Totals (12 entries)		**24**	**24**	**24**	**72**

=== 1,000 m ===
Year	Gold	Silver	Bronze
1996	(Russia) Sergey Klevchenya	(Norway) Ådne Søndrål	(South Korea) Jaegal Sung-yeol
1997	(Norway) Ådne Søndrål	(Netherlands) Jan Bos	(Netherlands) Martin Hersman
1998	(Canada) Sylvain Bouchard	(Canada) Jeremy Wotherspoon	(Japan) Hiroyasu Shimizu
1999	(Netherlands) Jan Bos	(Japan) Hiroyasu Shimizu	(Netherlands) Jakko Jan Leeuwangh
2000	(Norway) Ådne Søndrål (2)	(Netherlands) Jan Bos	(Canada) Mike Ireland
2001	(Canada) Jeremy Wotherspoon	(Norway) Ådne Søndrål	(Russia) Sergey Klevchenya
2003	(Netherlands) Erben Wennemars	(Netherlands) Gerard van Velde	(United States) Joey Cheek
2004	(Netherlands) Erben Wennemars (2)	(Canada) Jeremy Wotherspoon	(Japan) Masaaki Kobayashi
2005	(Norway) Even Wetten	(Netherlands) Jan Bos	(Norway) Petter Andersen (Finland) Pekka Koskela
2007	(United States) Shani Davis	(Canada) Denny Morrison	(South Korea) Lee Kyou-hyuk
2008	(United States) Shani Davis	(Russia) Yevgeny Lalenkov	(Canada) Denny Morrison
2009	(United States) Trevor Marsicano	(Canada) Denny Morrison	(United States) Shani Davis
2011	(United States) Shani Davis	(Netherlands) Kjeld Nuis	(Netherlands) Stefan Groothuis
2012	(Netherlands) Stefan Groothuis	(Netherlands) Kjeld Nuis	(United States) Shani Davis
2013	(Kazakhstan) Denis Kuzin	(South Korea) Mo Tae-bum	(United States) Shani Davis
2015	(United States) Shani Davis **(4)**	(Russia) Pavel Kulizhnikov	(Netherlands) Kjeld Nuis
2016	(Russia) Pavel Kulizhnikov	(Russia) Denis Yuskov	(Netherlands) Kjeld Nuis
2017	(Netherlands) Kjeld Nuis	(Canada) Vincent De Haître	(Netherlands) Kai Verbij
2019	(Netherlands) Kai Verbij	(Netherlands) Thomas Krol	(Netherlands) Kjeld Nuis
2020	(Russia) Pavel Kulizhnikov (2)	(Netherlands) Kjeld Nuis	(Canada) Laurent Dubreuil
2021	(Netherlands) Kai Verbij (2)	**RSU** Pavel Kulizhnikov	(Canada) Laurent Dubreuil
2023	(United States) Jordan Stolz	(Netherlands) Thomas Krol	(United Kingdom) Cornelius Kersten
2024	(United States) Jordan Stolz (2)	(China) Ning Zhongyan	(Netherlands) Kjeld Nuis
2025	(Netherlands) Joep Wennemars	(Netherlands) Jenning de Boo	(United States) Jordan Stolz

Source: schaatsstatistieken.nl

Medal table

Rank	Nation	Gold	Silver	Bronze	Total
1	Netherlands	8	10	8	26
2	United States	7	0	5	12
3	Russia	3	3	1	7
4	Norway	3	2	1	6
5	Canada	2	5	4	11
6	Kazakhstan	1	0	0	1
7	Japan	0	1	2	3
7	South Korea	0	1	2	3
9	China	0	1	0	1
9	Russian Skating Union	0	1	0	1
11	Finland	0	0	1	1
11	Great Britain	0	0	1	1
Totals (12 entries)		**24**	**24**	**25**	**73**

=== 1,500 m ===
Year	Gold	Silver	Bronze
1996	(Netherlands) Jeroen Straathof	(Norway) Ådne Søndrål	(Netherlands) Martin Hersman
1997	(Netherlands) Rintje Ritsma	(Norway) Ådne Søndrål	(Canada) Neal Marshall
1998	(Norway) Ådne Søndrål	(Netherlands) Ids Postma	(Italy) Roberto Sighel
1999	(Netherlands) Ids Postma	(Norway) Ådne Søndrål	(Netherlands) Rintje Ritsma
2000	(Netherlands) Ids Postma (2)	(Norway) Ådne Søndrål	(Netherlands) Jan Bos
2001	(Norway) Ådne Søndrål (2)	(United States) Derek Parra	(Netherlands) Erben Wennemars
2003	(Netherlands) Erben Wennemars	(Netherlands) Ralf van der Rijst	(United States) Joey Cheek
2004	(United States) Shani Davis	(Netherlands) Mark Tuitert	(Netherlands) Erben Wennemars
2005	(Norway) Rune Stordal	(Netherlands) Mark Tuitert	(Norway) Even Wetten
2007	(United States) Shani Davis	(Netherlands) Erben Wennemars	(Canada) Denny Morrison
2008	(Canada) Denny Morrison	(United States) Shani Davis (Netherlands) Sven Kramer	none awarded
2009	(United States) Shani Davis **(3)**	(United States) Trevor Marsicano	(Canada) Denny Morrison
2011	(Norway) Håvard Bøkko	(United States) Shani Davis	(Canada) Lucas Makowsky
2012	(Canada) Denny Morrison (2)	(Russia) Ivan Skobrev	(Norway) Håvard Bøkko
2013	(Russia) Denis Yuskov	(United States) Shani Davis	(Russia) Ivan Skobrev
2015	(Russia) Denis Yuskov	(Canada) Denny Morrison	(Netherlands) Koen Verweij
2016	(Russia) Denis Yuskov **(3)**	(Netherlands) Kjeld Nuis	(Netherlands) Thomas Krol
2017	(Netherlands) Kjeld Nuis	(Russia) Denis Yuskov	(Netherlands) Sven Kramer
2019	(Netherlands) Thomas Krol	(Norway) Sverre Lunde Pedersen	(Russia) Denis Yuskov
2020	(Netherlands) Kjeld Nuis (2)	(Netherlands) Thomas Krol	(United States) Joey Mantia
2021	(Netherlands) Thomas Krol (2)	(Netherlands) Kjeld Nuis	(Netherlands) Patrick Roest
2023	(United States) Jordan Stolz	(Netherlands) Kjeld Nuis	(Netherlands) Thomas Krol
2024	(United States) Jordan Stolz (2)	(Netherlands) Kjeld Nuis	(Norway) Peder Kongshaug
2025	(Norway) Peder Kongshaug	(United States) Jordan Stolz	(Canada) Connor Howe

Source: schaatsstatistieken.nl

Medal table

Rank	Nation	Gold	Silver	Bronze	Total
1	Netherlands	9	11	10	30
2	United States	5	6	2	13
3	Norway	5	5	3	13
4	Russia	3	2	2	7
5	Canada	2	1	5	8
6	Italy	0	0	1	1
Totals (6 entries)		**24**	**25**	**23**	**72**

=== 5,000 m ===
Year	Gold	Silver	Bronze
1996	(Netherlands) Ids Postma	(Japan) Keiji Shirahata	(Netherlands) Gianni Romme
1997	(Netherlands) Rintje Ritsma	(Netherlands) Gianni Romme	(Germany) Frank Dittrich
1998	(Netherlands) Gianni Romme	(Netherlands) Rintje Ritsma	(Belgium) Bart Veldkamp
1999	(Netherlands) Gianni Romme	(Belgium) Bart Veldkamp	(Netherlands) Bob de Jong
2000	(Netherlands) Gianni Romme (3)	(Netherlands) Bob de Jong	(Japan) Keiji Shirahata
2001	(Netherlands) Bob de Jong	(Netherlands) Carl Verheijen	(Netherlands) Gianni Romme
2003	(Netherlands) Jochem Uytdehaage	(Netherlands) Bob de Jong	(Netherlands) Carl Verheijen
2004	(United States) Chad Hedrick	(Netherlands) Carl Verheijen	(Netherlands) Gianni Romme
2005	(United States) Chad Hedrick (2)	(Netherlands) Bob de Jong	(Netherlands) Carl Verheijen
2007	(Netherlands) Sven Kramer	(Italy) Enrico Fabris	(Netherlands) Carl Verheijen
2008	(Netherlands) Sven Kramer	(Italy) Enrico Fabris	(Netherlands) Wouter olde Heuvel
2009	(Netherlands) Sven Kramer	(Norway) Håvard Bøkko	(United States) Trevor Marsicano
2011	(Netherlands) Bob de Jong (2)	(South Korea) Lee Seung-hoon	(Russia) Ivan Skobrev
2012	(Netherlands) Sven Kramer	(Netherlands) Bob de Jong	(United States) Jonathan Kuck
2013	(Netherlands) Sven Kramer	(Netherlands) Jorrit Bergsma	(Russia) Ivan Skobrev
2015	(Netherlands) Sven Kramer	(Netherlands) Jorrit Bergsma	(Netherlands) Douwe de Vries
2016	(Netherlands) Sven Kramer	(Netherlands) Jorrit Bergsma	(Norway) Sverre Lunde Pedersen
2017	(Netherlands) Sven Kramer **(8)**	(Netherlands) Jorrit Bergsma	(New Zealand) Peter Michael
2019	(Norway) Sverre Lunde Pedersen	(Netherlands) Patrick Roest	(Netherlands) Sven Kramer
2020	(Canada) Ted-Jan Bloemen	(Netherlands) Sven Kramer	(Canada) Graeme Fish
2021	(Sweden) Nils van der Poel	(Netherlands) Patrick Roest	**RSU** Sergey Trofimov
2023	(Netherlands) Patrick Roest	(Italy) Davide Ghiotto	(Belgium) Bart Swings
2024	(Netherlands) Patrick Roest (2)	(Italy) Davide Ghiotto	(Norway) Sander Eitrem
2025	(Norway) Sander Eitrem	(Netherlands) Beau Snellink	(Poland) Vladimir Semirunniy

Source: schaatsstatistieken.nl

Medal table

Rank	Nation	Gold	Silver	Bronze	Total
1	Netherlands	18	16	10	44
2	Norway	2	1	2	5
3	United States	2	0	2	4
4	Canada	1	0	1	2
5	Sweden	1	0	0	1
6	Italy	0	4	0	4
7	Belgium	0	1	2	3
8	Japan	0	1	1	2
9	South Korea	0	1	0	1
10	Russia	0	0	2	2
11	Germany	0	0	1	1
11	New Zealand	0	0	1	1
11	Poland	0	0	1	1
11	Russian Skating Union	0	0	1	1
Totals (14 entries)		**24**	**24**	**24**	**72**

=== 10,000 m ===
Year	Gold	Silver	Bronze
1996	(Netherlands) Gianni Romme	(Belgium) Bart Veldkamp	(Germany) Frank Dittrich
1997	(Netherlands) Gianni Romme	(Netherlands) Rintje Ritsma	(Netherlands) Bob de Jong
1998	(Netherlands) Gianni Romme	(Netherlands) Bob de Jong	(Germany) Frank Dittrich
1999	(Netherlands) Bob de Jong	(Netherlands) Gianni Romme	(Germany) Frank Dittrich
2000	(Netherlands) Gianni Romme (4)	(Netherlands) Bob de Jong	(Germany) Frank Dittrich
2001	(Netherlands) Carl Verheijen	(Netherlands) Bob de Jong	(Russia) Vadim Sayutin
2003	(Netherlands) Bob de Jong	(Netherlands) Carl Verheijen	(Norway) Lasse Sætre
2004	(Netherlands) Carl Verheijen (2)	(Netherlands) Bob de Jong	(United States) Chad Hedrick
2005	(Netherlands) Bob de Jong	(Netherlands) Carl Verheijen	(United States) Chad Hedrick
2007	(Netherlands) Sven Kramer	(Netherlands) Carl Verheijen	(Netherlands) Brigt Rykkje
2008	(Netherlands) Sven Kramer	(Italy) Enrico Fabris	(Netherlands) Bob de Jong
2009	(Netherlands) Sven Kramer	(Norway) Håvard Bøkko	(Netherlands) Bob de Jong
2011	(Netherlands) Bob de Jong	(Netherlands) Bob de Vries	(Russia) Ivan Skobrev
2012	(Netherlands) Bob de Jong **(5)**	(Netherlands) Jorrit Bergsma	(United States) Jonathan Kuck
2013	(Netherlands) Jorrit Bergsma	(Netherlands) Sven Kramer	(Netherlands) Bob de Jong
2015	(Netherlands) Jorrit Bergsma	(Netherlands) Erik Jan Kooiman	(Germany) Patrick Beckert
2016	(Netherlands) Sven Kramer	(Canada) Ted-Jan Bloemen	(Netherlands) Erik Jan Kooiman
2017	(Netherlands) Sven Kramer **(5)**	(Netherlands) Jorrit Bergsma	(Germany) Patrick Beckert
2019	(Netherlands) Jorrit Bergsma (3)	(Netherlands) Patrick Roest	(Russia) Danila Semerikov
2020	(Canada) Graeme Fish	(Canada) Ted-Jan Bloemen	(Germany) Patrick Beckert
2021	(Sweden) Nils van der Poel	(Netherlands) Jorrit Bergsma	**RSU** Aleksandr Rumyantsev
2023	(Italy) Davide Ghiotto	(Netherlands) Jorrit Bergsma	(Canada) Ted-Jan Bloemen
2024	(Italy) Davide Ghiotto	(Canada) Ted-Jan Bloemen	(Canada) Graeme Fish
2025	(Italy) Davide Ghiotto (3)	(Poland) Vladimir Semirunniy	(Czech Republic) Metoděj Jílek

Source: schaatsstatistieken.nl

Medal table

Rank	Nation	Gold	Silver	Bronze	Total
1	Netherlands	19	17	6	42
2	Italy	3	1	0	4
3	Canada	1	3	2	6
4	Sweden	1	0	0	1
5	Norway	0	1	1	2
6	Belgium	0	1	0	1
6	Poland	0	1	0	1
8	Germany	0	0	7	7
9	Russia	0	0	3	3
9	United States	0	0	3	3
11	Czech Republic	0	0	1	1
11	Russian Skating Union	0	0	1	1
Totals (12 entries)		**24**	**24**	**24**	**72**

=== Mass start ===
Year	Gold	Silver	Bronze
2015	(Netherlands) Arjan Stroetinga	(Italy) Fabio Francolini	(France) Alexis Contin
2016	(South Korea) Lee Seung-hoon	(Netherlands) Arjan Stroetinga	(France) Alexis Contin
2017	(United States) Joey Mantia	(France) Alexis Contin	(Canada) Olivier Jean
2019	(United States) Joey Mantia	(South Korea) Um Cheon-ho	(South Korea) Chung Jae-won
2020	(Netherlands) Jorrit Bergsma	(Canada) Jordan Belchos	(Canada) Antoine Gélinas-Beaulieu
2021	(United States) Joey Mantia **(3)**	(Netherlands) Arjan Stroetinga	(Belgium) Bart Swings
2023	(Belgium) Bart Swings	(Netherlands) Bart Hoolwerf	(Italy) Andrea Giovannini
2024	(Belgium) Bart Swings (2)	(Canada) Antoine Gélinas-Beaulieu	(Switzerland) Livio Wenger
2025	(Italy) Andrea Giovannini	(South Korea) Lee Seung-hoon	(Belgium) Bart Swings

Source: schaatsstatistieken.nl

Medal table

Rank	Nation	Gold	Silver	Bronze	Total
1	United States	3	0	0	3
2	Netherlands	2	3	0	5
3	Belgium	2	0	2	4
4	South Korea	1	2	1	4
5	Italy	1	1	1	3
6	Canada	0	2	2	4
7	France	0	1	2	3
8	Switzerland	0	0	1	1
Totals (8 entries)		**9**	**9**	**9**	**27**

=== Team pursuit ===
Year	Gold	Silver	Bronze
2005	**Netherlands**; Mark Tuitert; Carl Verheijen; Erben Wennemars	**Italy**; Matteo Anesi; Enrico Fabris; Ippolito Sanfratello	**Norway**; Petter Andersen; Odd Borgersen; Eskil Ervik
2007	**Netherlands**; Sven Kramer; Carl Verheijen; Erben Wennemars	**Canada**; Arne Dankers; Denny Morrison; Justin Warsylewicz	**Russia**; Yevgeny Lalenkov; Ivan Skobrev; Alexey Yunin
2008	**Netherlands**; Sven Kramer; Wouter olde Heuvel; Erben Wennemars (3)	**Italy**; Matteo Anesi; Enrico Fabris; Luca Stefani	**Germany**; Jörg Dallmann; Stefan Heythausen; Marco Weber
2009	**Netherlands**; Sven Kramer; Wouter olde Heuvel (2); Carl Verheijen (3)	**Sweden**; Joel Eriksson; Daniel Friberg; Johan Röjler	**United States**; Ryan Bedford; Brian Hansen; Trevor Marsicano
2011	**United States**; Shani Davis; Jonathan Kuck; Trevor Marsicano	**Canada**; Mathieu Giroux; Lucas Makowsky; Denny Morrison	**Netherlands**; Jan Blokhuijsen; Bob de Vries; Koen Verweij
2012	**Netherlands**; Jan Blokhuijsen; Sven Kramer; Koen Verweij	**United States**; Shani Davis; Brian Hansen; Jonathan Kuck	**Russia**; Yevgeny Lalenkov; Ivan Skobrev; Denis Yuskov
2013	**Netherlands**; Jan Blokhuijsen; Sven Kramer; Koen Verweij	**South Korea**; Joo Hyong-jun; Kim Cheol-min; Lee Seung-hoon	**Poland**; Zbigniew Bródka; Konrad Niedźwiedzki; Jan Szymański
2015	**Netherlands**; Douwe de Vries; Sven Kramer; Koen Verweij (3)	**Canada**; Jordan Belchos; Ted-Jan Bloemen; Denny Morrison	**South Korea**; Kim Cheol-min; Ko Byung-wook; Lee Seung-hoon
2016	**Netherlands**; Jan Blokhuijsen; Douwe de Vries; Arjan Stroetinga	**Norway**; Håvard Bøkko; Simen Spieler Nilsen; Sverre Lunde Pedersen	**Canada**; Jordan Belchos; Ted-Jan Bloemen; Benjamin Donnelly
2017	**Netherlands**; Jorrit Bergsma; Jan Blokhuijsen (4); Douwe de Vries	**New Zealand**; Shane Dobbin; Reyon Kay; Peter Michael	**Norway**; Sindre Henriksen; Simen Spieler Nilsen; Sverre Lunde Pedersen
2019	**Netherlands**; Marcel Bosker; Douwe de Vries; Sven Kramer	**Norway**; Håvard Bøkko; Sindre Henriksen; Sverre Lunde Pedersen	**Russia**; Aleksandr Rumyantsev; Danila Semerikov; Sergey Trofimov
2020	**Netherlands**; Marcel Bosker; Douwe de Vries (5); Sven Kramer **(8)**	**Japan**; Seitaro Ichinohe; Riku Tsuchiya; Shane Williamson	**Russia**; Danila Semerikov; Sergey Trofimov; Ruslan Zakharov
2021	**Netherlands**; Marcel Bosker; Patrick Roest; Beau Snellink	**Canada**; Jordan Belchos; Ted-Jan Bloemen; Connor Howe	**Russian Skating Union**; Danila Semerikov; Sergey Trofimov; Ruslan Zakharov
2023	**Netherlands**; Marcel Bosker (4); Patrick Roest (2); Beau Snellink (2)	**Canada**; Antoine Gélinas-Beaulieu; Connor Howe; Hayden Mayeur	**Norway**; Allan Dahl Johansson; Peder Kongshaug; Sverre Lunde Pedersen
2024	**Italy**; Davide Ghiotto; Andrea Giovannini; Michele Malfatti	**Norway**; Sander Eitrem; Peder Kongshaug; Sverre Lunde Pedersen	**Canada**; Antoine Gélinas-Beaulieu; Connor Howe; Hayden Mayeur
2025	**United States**; Ethan Cepuran; Casey Dawson; Emery Lehman	**Italy**; Davide Ghiotto; Andrea Giovannini; Michele Malfatti	**Netherlands**; Marcel Bosker; Chris Huizinga; Beau Snellink

Source: schaatsstatistieken.nl

Medal table

Rank	Nation	Gold	Silver	Bronze	Total
1	Netherlands	13	0	2	15
2	United States	2	1	1	4
3	Italy	1	3	0	4
4	Canada	0	5	2	7
5	Norway	0	3	3	6
6	South Korea	0	1	1	2
7	Japan	0	1	0	1
7	New Zealand	0	1	0	1
7	Sweden	0	1	0	1
10	Russia	0	0	4	4
11	Germany	0	0	1	1
11	Poland	0	0	1	1
11	Russian Skating Union	0	0	1	1
Totals (13 entries)		**16**	**16**	**16**	**48**

=== Team sprint ===
Year	Gold	Silver	Bronze
2019	**Netherlands**; Ronald Mulder; Kai Verbij; Kjeld Nuis	**South Korea**; Kim Jun-ho; Cha Min-kyu; Kim Tae-yun	**Russia**; Ruslan Murashov; Pavel Kulizhnikov; Viktor Mushtakov
2020	**Netherlands**; Dai Dai N'tab; Kai Verbij **(2)**; Thomas Krol	**China**; Gao Tingyu; Wang Shiwei; Ning Zhongyan	**Norway**; Bjørn Magnussen; Håvard Holmefjord Lorentzen; Odin By Farstad
2021	Not included in the program		
2022	Held during the 2022 World Sprint Championships		
2023	**Canada**; Christopher Fiola; Laurent Dubreuil; Antoine Gélinas-Beaulieu	**Netherlands**; Merijn Scheperkamp; Hein Otterspeer; Wesly Dijs	**Norway**; Bjørn Magnussen; Henrik Fagerli Rukke; Håvard Holmefjord Lorentzen
2024	**Canada**; Anders Johnson; Laurent Dubreuil **(2)**; Antoine Gélinas-Beaulieu **(2)**	**Netherlands**; Janno Botman; Jenning de Boo; Tim Prins	**Norway**; Henrik Fagerli Rukke; Bjørn Magnussen; Håvard Holmefjord Lorentzen
2025	**China**; Xue Zhiwen; Lian Ziwen; Ning Zhongyan	**Netherlands**; Janno Botman; Jenning de Boo; Tim Prins	**United States**; Austin Kleba; Cooper McLeod; Zach Stoppelmoor

Source: schaatsstatistieken.nl

Medal table

Rank	Nation	Gold	Silver	Bronze	Total
1	Netherlands	2	3	0	5
2	Canada	2	0	0	2
3	China	1	1	0	2
4	South Korea	0	1	0	1
5	Norway	0	0	3	3
6	Russia	0	0	1	1
6	United States	0	0	1	1
Totals (7 entries)		**5**	**5**	**5**	**15**

== Medal summary ==
Updated after the 2025 World Championships.

=== Nations ===
Rank	Nation	Gold	Silver	Bronze	Total
1	Netherlands	73	63	41	177
2	United States	21	8	17	46
3	Canada	12	21	22	55
4	Norway	10	14	14	38
5	Russia	10	9	15	34
6	Japan	7	8	7	22
7	South Korea	6	8	4	18
8	Italy	5	9	2	16
9	Belgium	2	2	4	8
10	Sweden	2	1	0	3
11	China	1	2	1	4
12	Kazakhstan	1	0	0	1
13	Russian Skating Union	0	2	3	5
14	Germany	0	1	9	10
15	Poland	0	1	3	4
16	France	0	1	2	3
17	New Zealand	0	1	1	2
18	Finland	0	0	2	2
19	Czech Republic	0	0	1	1
19	Great Britain	0	0	1	1
19	Switzerland	0	0	1	1
Totals (21 entries)		150	151	150	451

=== World champions ===
Skater	1st place, gold medalist(s)	2nd place, silver medalist(s)	3rd place, bronze medalist(s)	Total
(Netherlands) Sven Kramer	21	3	2	26
(United States) Shani Davis	8	4	3	15
(Netherlands) Bob de Jong	7	8	5	20
(Netherlands) Gianni Romme	7	2	3	12
(Netherlands) Erben Wennemars	6	2	3	11
(United States) Jordan Stolz	6	2	1	9
(Netherlands) Jorrit Bergsma	5	8	0	13
(Netherlands) Carl Verheijen	5	5	3	13
(Japan) Hiroyasu Shimizu	5	3	2	10
(Russia) RSU Pavel Kulizhnikov	5	3	1	8
(Netherlands) Douwe de Vries	5	0	1	6
(Netherlands) Kjeld Nuis	4	7	4	15
(Norway) Ådne Søndrål	4	6	0	10
(Canada) Jeremy Wotherspoon	4	3	3	10
(Netherlands) Patrick Roest	4	3	1	8
(Italy) Davide Ghiotto	4	3	0	7
(Netherlands) Jan Blokhuijsen	4	0	1	5
(Netherlands) Marcel Bosker	4	0	1	5
(Netherlands) Kai Verbij	4	0	1	5
(Netherlands) Thomas Krol	3	3	2	8
(Canada) Laurent Dubreuil	3	2	3	8
(Russia) Denis Yuskov	3	2	2	7
(Netherlands) Ids Postma	3	1	0	4
(Netherlands) Koen Verweij	3	0	2	5
(United States) Joey Mantia	3	0	1	4
(Canada) Denny Morrison	2	6	3	11
(Canada) Antoine Gélinas-Beaulieu	2	2	2	6
(Netherlands) Rintje Ritsma	2	2	1	5
(Netherlands) Arjan Stroetinga	2	2	0	4
(United States) Trevor Marsicano	2	1	2	5
(Italy) Andrea Giovannini	2	1	1	4
(Netherlands) Beau Snellink	2	1	1	4
(South Korea) Mo Tae-bum	2	1	0	3
(Belgium) Bart Swings	2	0	3	5
(United States) Chad Hedrick	2	0	2	4
(Netherlands) Wouter olde Heuvel	2	0	1	3
(South Korea) Lee Kang-seok	2	0	0	2
(Sweden) Nils van der Poel	2	0	0	2
(Canada) Ted-Jan Bloemen	1	5	2	8
(Norway) Sverre Lunde Pedersen	1	4	3	8
(Norway) Håvard Bøkko	1	4	1	6
(Netherlands) Jan Bos	1	3	1	5
(South Korea) Lee Seung-hoon	1	3	1	5
(Netherlands) Jenning de Boo	1	3	0	4
(Russia) Ruslan Murashov	1	2	2	5
(Japan) Joji Kato	1	2	1	4
(South Korea) Lee Kyou-hyuk	1	2	1	4
(China) Ning Zhongyan	1	2	0	3
(Netherlands) Mark Tuitert	1	2	0	3
(Norway) Peder Kongshaug	1	1	2	4
(United States) Jonathan Kuck	1	1	2	4
(Norway) Sander Eitrem	1	1	1	3
(Russia) Sergey Klevchenya	1	1	1	3
(Canada) Sylvain Bouchard	1	1	0	2
(Italy) Michele Malfatti	1	1	0	2
(Canada) Graeme Fish	1	0	2	3
(Netherlands) Jan Smeekens	1	0	2	3
(Netherlands) Stefan Groothuis	1	0	1	2
(Netherlands) Dai Dai N'tab	1	0	1	2
(Norway) Even Wetten	1	0	1	2
(United States) Ethan Cepuran	1	0	0	1
(United States) Casey Dawson	1	0	0	1
(Canada) Christopher Fiola	1	0	0	1
(Japan) Manabu Horii	1	0	0	1
(Canada) Anders Johnson	1	0	0	1
(Kazakhstan) Denis Kuzin	1	0	0	1
(United States) Emery Lehman	1	0	0	1
(China) Lian Ziwen	1	0	0	1
(Netherlands) Ronald Mulder	1	0	0	1
(Norway) Rune Stordal	1	0	0	1
(Netherlands) Jeroen Straathof	1	0	0	1
(Netherlands) Jochem Uytdehaage	1	0	0	1
(Netherlands) Joep Wennemars	1	0	0	1
(China) Xue Zhiwen	1	0	0	1

=== Silver medalists ===
Skater	2nd place, silver medalist(s)	3rd place, bronze medalist(s)	Total
(Italy) Enrico Fabris	5	0	5
(Canada) Jordan Belchos	3	1	4
(Canada) Connor Howe	2	2	4
(Belgium) Bart Veldkamp	2	1	3
(Italy) Matteo Anesi	2	0	2
(Netherlands) Janno Botman	2	0	2
(Netherlands) Michel Mulder	2	0	2
(Netherlands) Tim Prins	2	0	2
(Russia) Ivan Skobrev	1	6	7
(Norway) Håvard Holmefjord Lorentzen	1	3	4
(France) Alexis Contin	1	2	3
(Canada) Mike Ireland	1	2	3
(Russia) Yevgeny Lalenkov	1	2	3
(Netherlands) Bob de Vries	1	1	2
(United States) Brian Hansen	1	1	2
(Norway) Sindre Henriksen	1	1	2
(South Korea) Kim Cheol-min	1	1	2
(Netherlands) Erik Jan Kooiman	1	1	2
(Canada) Lucas Makowsky	1	1	2
(Canada) Hayden Mayeur	1	1	2
(New Zealand) Peter Michael	1	1	2
(Norway) Simen Spieler Nilsen	1	1	2
(Poland) Vladimir Semirunniy	1	1	2
(Japan) Keiji Shirahata	1	1	2
(Norway) Roger Strøm	1	1	2
(South Korea) Cha Min-kyu	1	0	1
(Canada) Arne Dankers	1	0	1
(Canada) Vincent De Haître	1	0	1
(Netherlands) Wesly Dijs	1	0	1
(New Zealand) Shane Dobbin	1	0	1
(Sweden) Joel Eriksson	1	0	1
(Italy) Fabio Francolini	1	0	1
(Sweden) Daniel Friberg	1	0	1
(China) Gao Tingyu	1	0	1
(Canada) Mathieu Giroux	1	0	1
(Netherlands) Bart Hoolwerf	1	0	1
(Japan) Seitaro Ichinohe	1	0	1
(Germany) Nico Ihle	1	0	1
(South Korea) Joo Hyong-jun	1	0	1
(New Zealand) Reyon Kay	1	0	1
(South Korea) Kim Jun-ho	1	0	1
(South Korea) Kim Tae-yun	1	0	1
(Russia) Dmitry Lobkov	1	0	1
(Japan) Yuya Oikawa	1	0	1
(Netherlands) Hein Otterspeer	1	0	1
(United States) Derek Parra	1	0	1
(Sweden) Johan Röjler	1	0	1
(Italy) Ippolito Sanfratello	1	0	1
(Italy) Luca Stefani	1	0	1
(Japan) Riku Tsuchiya	1	0	1
(South Korea) Um Cheon-ho	1	0	1
(Netherlands) Ralf van der Rijst	1	0	1
(Netherlands) Gerard van Velde	1	0	1
(China) Wang Shiwei	1	0	1
(Canada) Justin Warsylewicz	1	0	1
(Japan) Shane Williamson	1	0	1

=== Bronze medalists ===
Skater	3rd place, bronze medalist(s)
(Germany) Frank Dittrich	5
(Russia) RSU Danila Semerikov	4
(Russia) RSU Sergey Trofimov	4
(Germany) Patrick Beckert	3
(Norway) Bjørn Magnussen	3
(Norway) Petter Andersen	2
(United States) Joey Cheek	2
(Netherlands) Martin Hersman	2
(Finland) Pekka Koskela	2
(Netherlands) Jakko Jan Leeuwangh	2
(United States) Cooper McLeod	2
(Russia) Viktor Mushtakov	2
(Norway) Henrik Fagerli Rukke	2
(Russia) RSU Aleksandr Rumyantsev	2
(Russia) RSU Ruslan Zakharov	2
(United States) Ryan Bedford	1
(Canada) Alex Boisvert-Lacroix	1
(Norway) Odd Bohlin Borgersen	1
(Poland) Zbigniew Bródka	1
(South Korea) Chung Jae-won	1
(Germany) Jörg Dallmann	1
(Canada) Benjamin Donnelly	1
(Norway) Eskil Ervik	1
(Norway) Odin By Farstad	1
(United States) Casey Fitzrandolph	1
(United States) Tucker Fredricks	1
(Germany) Stefan Heythausen	1
(Netherlands) Chris Huizinga	1
(South Korea) Jaegal Sung-yeol	1
(Canada) Olivier Jean	1
(Czech Republic) Metoděj Jílek	1
(Norway) Allan Dahl Johansson	1
(United Kingdom) Cornelius Kersten	1
(United States) Austin Kleba	1
(South Korea) Ko Byung-wook	1
(Japan) Masaaki Kobayashi	1
(Canada) Neal Marshall	1
(Japan) Wataru Morishige	1
(Poland) Konrad Niedźwiedzki	1
(Netherlands) Brigt Rykkje	1
(Russia) Vadim Sayutin	1
(Norway) Lasse Sætre	1
(Japan) Tatsuya Shinhama	1
(Italy) Roberto Sighel	1
(United States) Zach Stoppelmoor	1
(Poland) Jan Szymański	1
(Germany) Marco Weber	1
(Switzerland) Livio Wenger	1
(China) Yu Fengtong	1
(Russia) Alexey Yunin	1
(Poland) Damian Żurek	1
