= World Single Distances Speed Skating Championships for Women =

The International Skating Union has organised the World Single Distances Speed Skating Championships for Women since 1996.

== Locations ==
- 1996: Hamar, Norway
- 1997: Warsaw, Poland
- 1998: Calgary, Canada
- 1999: Heerenveen, Netherlands
- 2000: Nagano, Japan
- 2001: Salt Lake City, United States
- 2002 Not held because of the Winter Olympic Games
- 2003: Berlin, Germany
- 2004: Seoul, South Korea
- 2005: Inzell, Germany
- 2006 Not held because of the Winter Olympic Games
- 2007: Salt Lake City, United States
- 2008: Nagano, Japan
- 2009: Vancouver, Canada
- 2010 Not held because of the Winter Olympic Games
- 2011: Inzell, Germany
- 2012: Heerenveen, Netherlands
- 2013: Sochi, Russia
- 2014 Not held because of the Winter Olympic Games
- 2015: Heerenveen, Netherlands
- 2016: Kolomna, Russia
- 2017: Gangneung, South Korea
- 2018 Not held because of the Winter Olympic Games
- 2019: Inzell, Germany
- 2020: Salt Lake City, United States
- 2021: Heerenveen, Netherlands
- 2022 Not held because of the Winter Olympic Games
- 2023: Heerenveen, Netherlands
- 2024: Calgary, Canada
- 2025: Hamar, Norway

== Medal winners ==
=== 500 m ===
Year	Gold	Silver	Bronze
1996	(Russia) Svetlana Zhurova	(Japan) Kyoko Shimazaki	(Japan) Tomomi Okazaki
1997	(China) Xue Ruihong	(Germany) Sabine Völker	(Germany) Franziska Schenk
1998	(Canada) Catriona Le May Doan	(Russia) Svetlana Zhurova	(Japan) Tomomi Okazaki
1999	(Canada) Catriona Le May Doan	(Russia) Svetlana Zhurova	(Japan) Tomomi Okazaki (Netherlands) Marianne Timmer
2000	(Germany) Monique Garbrecht	(Russia) Svetlana Zhurova	(Canada) Catriona Le May Doan
2001	(Canada) Catriona Le May Doan (3)	(Germany) Monique Garbrecht-Enfeldt	(Russia) Svetlana Zhurova
2003	(Germany) Monique Garbrecht-Enfeldt (2)	(China) Wang Manli	(Belarus) Anzhelika Kotyuga
2004	(China) Wang Manli	(Belarus) Anzhelika Kotyuga	(China) Ren Hui
2005	(China) Wang Manli (2)	(China) Wang Beixing	(South Korea) Lee Sang-hwa
2007	(Germany) Jenny Wolf	(China) Wang Beixing	(Japan) Sayuri Osuga
2008	(Germany) Jenny Wolf	(China) Wang Beixing	(Netherlands) Annette Gerritsen
2009	(Germany) Jenny Wolf	(China) Wang Beixing	(South Korea) Lee Sang-hwa
2011	(Germany) Jenny Wolf (4)	(South Korea) Lee Sang-hwa	(China) Wang Beixing
2012	(South Korea) Lee Sang-hwa	(China) Yu Jing	(Netherlands) Thijsje Oenema
2013	(South Korea) Lee Sang-hwa	(China) Wang Beixing	(Russia) Olga Fatkulina
2015	(United States) Heather Richardson	(United States) Brittany Bowe	(Japan) Nao Kodaira
2016	(South Korea) Lee Sang-hwa (3)	(United States) Brittany Bowe	(China) Zhang Hong
2017	(Japan) Nao Kodaira	(South Korea) Lee Sang-hwa	(China) Yu Jing
2019	(Austria) Vanessa Herzog	(Japan) Nao Kodaira	(Japan) Konami Soga
2020	(Japan) Nao Kodaira (2)	(Russia) Angelina Golikova	(Russia) Olga Fatkulina
2021	RSU Angelina Golikova	(Netherlands) Femke Kok	RSU Olga Fatkulina
2023	(Netherlands) Femke Kok	(Austria) Vanessa Herzog	(Netherlands) Jutta Leerdam
2024	(Netherlands) Femke Kok	(South Korea) Kim Min-sun	(United States) Kimi Goetz
2025	(Netherlands) Femke Kok (3)	(Netherlands) Jutta Leerdam	(South Korea) Kim Min-sun

Source: schaatsstatistieken.nl

Medal table

Rank	Nation	Gold	Silver	Bronze	Total
1	Germany	6	2	1	9
2	China	3	7	4	14
3	South Korea	3	3	3	9
4	Netherlands	3	2	4	9
5	Canada	3	0	1	4
6	Japan	2	2	6	10
7	Russia	1	4	3	8
8	United States	1	2	1	4
9	Austria	1	1	0	2
10	Russian Skating Union	1	0	1	2
11	Belarus	0	1	1	2
Totals (11 entries)		24	24	25	73

=== 1,000 m ===
Year	Gold	Silver	Bronze
1996	(Netherlands) Annamarie Thomas	(United States) Chris Witty	(Austria) Emese Hunyady
1997	(Netherlands) Marianne Timmer	(Netherlands) Sandra Zwolle	(Germany) Franziska Schenk
1998	(United States) Chris Witty	(Canada) Catriona Le May Doan	(Germany) Franziska Schenk
1999	(Netherlands) Marianne Timmer (2)	(Germany) Monique Garbrecht	(Canada) Catriona Le May Doan
2000	(Germany) Monique Garbrecht	(Netherlands) Marianne Timmer	(United States) Chris Witty
2001	(Germany) Monique Garbrecht-Enfeldt (2)	(Germany) Sabine Völker	(Canada) Catriona Le May Doan
2003	(Germany) Anni Friesinger	(United States) Jennifer Rodriguez	(Canada) Cindy Klassen
2004	(Germany) Anni Friesinger	(Netherlands) Marianne Timmer	(Canada) Cindy Klassen
2005	(Netherlands) Barbara de Loor	(Germany) Anni Friesinger	(Netherlands) Marianne Timmer
2007	(Netherlands) Ireen Wüst	(Germany) Anni Friesinger	(Canada) Christine Nesbitt
2008	(Germany) Anni Friesinger (3)	(Canada) Kristina Groves	(Netherlands) Annette Gerritsen
2009	(Canada) Christine Nesbitt	(Germany) Anni Friesinger	(Netherlands) Margot Boer
2011	(Canada) Christine Nesbitt	(Netherlands) Ireen Wüst	(United States) Heather Richardson
2012	(Canada) Christine Nesbitt (3)	(China) Yu Jing	(Netherlands) Margot Boer
2013	(Russia) Olga Fatkulina	(Netherlands) Ireen Wüst	(United States) Brittany Bowe
2015	(United States) Brittany Bowe	(United States) Heather Richardson	(Czech Republic) Karolina Erbanová
2016	(Netherlands) Jorien ter Mors	(United States) Heather Richardson-Bergsma	(United States) Brittany Bowe
2017	(United States) Heather Bergsma	(Japan) Nao Kodaira	(Netherlands) Jorien ter Mors
2019	(United States) Brittany Bowe	(Austria) Vanessa Herzog	(Japan) Nao Kodaira
2020	(Netherlands) Jutta Leerdam	(Russia) Olga Fatkulina	(Japan) Miho Takagi
2021	(United States) Brittany Bowe (3)	(Netherlands) Jutta Leerdam	RSU Elizaveta Golubeva
2023	(Netherlands) Jutta Leerdam (2)	(Netherlands) Antoinette Rijpma-de Jong	(Japan) Miho Takagi
2024	(Japan) Miho Takagi	(China) Han Mei	(Netherlands) Jutta Leerdam
2025	(Japan) Miho Takagi (2)	(Netherlands) Femke Kok	(Netherlands) Jutta Leerdam

Source: schaatsstatistieken.nl

Medal table

Rank	Nation	Gold	Silver	Bronze	Total
1	Netherlands	8	8	7	23
2	Germany	5	5	2	12
3	United States	5	4	4	13
4	Canada	3	2	5	10
5	Japan	2	1	3	6
6	Russia	1	1	0	2
7	China	0	2	0	2
8	Austria	0	1	1	2
9	Czech Republic	0	0	1	1
9	Russian Skating Union	0	0	1	1
Totals (10 entries)		24	24	24	72

=== 1,500 m ===
Year	Gold	Silver	Bronze
1996	(Netherlands) Annamarie Thomas	(Germany) Claudia Pechstein	(Netherlands) Sandra Zwolle
1997	(Germany) Gunda Niemann	(Germany) Anni Friesinger	(Netherlands) Marianne Timmer
1998	(Germany) Anni Friesinger	(Germany) Gunda Niemann-Stirnemann	(Germany) Claudia Pechstein
1999	(Austria) Emese Hunyady	(Germany) Gunda Niemann-Stirnemann	(Netherlands) Tonny de Jong
2000	(Germany) Claudia Pechstein	(Germany) Anni Friesinger	(Austria) Emese Hunyady
2001	(Germany) Anni Friesinger	(Japan) Maki Tabata	(Canada) Cindy Klassen
2003	(Germany) Anni Friesinger	(Japan) Maki Tabata	(United States) Jennifer Rodriguez
2004	(Germany) Anni Friesinger	(Canada) Cindy Klassen	(United States) Jennifer Rodriguez
2005	(Canada) Cindy Klassen	(Germany) Anni Friesinger	(United States) Jennifer Rodriguez
2007	(Netherlands) Ireen Wüst	(Canada) Cindy Klassen	(Canada) Kristina Groves
2008	(Germany) Anni Friesinger	(Netherlands) Paulien van Deutekom	(Canada) Kristina Groves
2009	(Germany) Anni Friesinger (6)	(Netherlands) Ireen Wüst	(Canada) Christine Nesbitt
2011	(Netherlands) Ireen Wüst	(Netherlands) Diane Valkenburg	(Netherlands) Jorien Voorhuis
2012	(Canada) Christine Nesbitt	(Netherlands) Ireen Wüst	(Netherlands) Linda de Vries
2013	(Netherlands) Ireen Wüst	(Netherlands) Lotte van Beek	(Canada) Christine Nesbitt
2015	(United States) Brittany Bowe	(Netherlands) Ireen Wüst	(United States) Heather Richardson
2016	(Netherlands) Jorien ter Mors	(United States) Heather Richardson-Bergsma	(United States) Brittany Bowe
2017	(United States) Heather Bergsma	(Netherlands) Ireen Wüst	(Japan) Miho Takagi
2019	(Netherlands) Ireen Wüst	(Japan) Miho Takagi	(United States) Brittany Bowe
2020	(Netherlands) Ireen Wüst (5)	(Russia) Evgeniia Lalenkova	(Russia) Elizaveta Kazelina
2021	(Norway) Ragne Wiklund	(United States) Brittany Bowe	RSU Evgeniia Lalenkova
2023	(Netherlands) Antoinette Rijpma-de Jong	(Norway) Ragne Wiklund	(Japan) Miho Takagi
2024	(Japan) Miho Takagi	(China) Han Mei	(Netherlands) Joy Beune
2025	(Netherlands) Joy Beune	(Netherlands) Antoinette Rijpma-de Jong	(China) Han Mei

Source: schaatsstatistieken.nl

Medal table

Rank	Nation	Gold	Silver	Bronze	Total
1	Netherlands	9	8	6	23
2	Germany	8	6	1	15
3	United States	2	2	6	10
4	Canada	2	2	5	9
5	Japan	1	3	2	6
6	Norway	1	1	0	2
7	Austria	1	0	1	2
8	China	0	1	1	2
8	Russia	0	1	1	2
10	Russian Skating Union	0	0	1	1
Totals (10 entries)		24	24	24	72

=== 3,000 m ===
Year	Gold	Silver	Bronze
1996	(Germany) Gunda Niemann	(Germany) Claudia Pechstein	(Kazakhstan) Lyudmila Prokasheva
1997	(Germany) Gunda Niemann	(Germany) Anni Friesinger	(Netherlands) Carla Zijlstra
1998	(Germany) Gunda Niemann-Stirnemann	(Germany) Claudia Pechstein	(Germany) Anni Friesinger
1999	(Germany) Gunda Niemann-Stirnemann	(Netherlands) Tonny de Jong (Germany) Claudia Pechstein	none awarded
2000	(Germany) Claudia Pechstein	(Germany) Gunda Niemann-Stirnemann	(Japan) Maki Tabata
2001	(Germany) Gunda Niemann-Stirnemann (5)	(Germany) Anni Friesinger	(Germany) Claudia Pechstein
2003	(Germany) Anni Friesinger	(Germany) Claudia Pechstein	(Netherlands) Gretha Smit
2004	(Germany) Claudia Pechstein (2)	(Germany) Anni Friesinger (Netherlands) Gretha Smit	none awarded
2005	(Canada) Cindy Klassen	(Germany) Claudia Pechstein	(Canada) Kristina Groves
2007	(Czech Republic) Martina Sáblíková	(Netherlands) Renate Groenewold	(Canada) Cindy Klassen
2008	(Canada) Kristina Groves	(Netherlands) Paulien van Deutekom	(Germany) Daniela Anschütz-Thoms
2009	(Netherlands) Renate Groenewold	(Czech Republic) Martina Sáblíková	(Canada) Kristina Groves
2011	(Netherlands) Ireen Wüst	(Czech Republic) Martina Sáblíková	(Germany) Stephanie Beckert
2012	(Czech Republic) Martina Sáblíková	(Germany) Stephanie Beckert	(Netherlands) Ireen Wüst
2013	(Netherlands) Ireen Wüst	(Czech Republic) Martina Sáblíková	(Germany) Claudia Pechstein
2015	(Czech Republic) Martina Sáblíková	(Netherlands) Ireen Wüst	(Netherlands) Marije Joling
2016	(Czech Republic) Martina Sáblíková	(Netherlands) Ireen Wüst	(Netherlands) Antoinette de Jong
2017	(Netherlands) Ireen Wüst (3)	(Czech Republic) Martina Sáblíková	(Netherlands) Antoinette de Jong
2019	(Czech Republic) Martina Sáblíková	(Netherlands) Antoinette de Jong	(Russia) Natalya Voronina
2020	(Czech Republic) Martina Sáblíková (6)	(Netherlands) Carlijn Achtereekte	(Russia) Natalya Voronina
2021	(Netherlands) Antoinette de Jong	(Czech Republic) Martina Sáblíková	(Netherlands) Irene Schouten
2023	(Norway) Ragne Wiklund	(Netherlands) Irene Schouten	(Czech Republic) Martina Sáblíková
2024	(Netherlands) Irene Schouten	(Canada) Isabelle Weidemann	(Czech Republic) Martina Sáblíková
2025	(Netherlands) Joy Beune	(Czech Republic) Martina Sáblíková	(Netherlands) Merel Conijn

Source: schaatsstatistieken.nl

Medal table

Rank	Nation	Gold	Silver	Bronze	Total
1	Germany	8	10	5	23
2	Netherlands	7	9	8	24
3	Czech Republic	6	6	2	14
4	Canada	2	1	3	6
5	Norway	1	0	0	1
6	Russia	0	0	2	2
7	Japan	0	0	1	1
7	Kazakhstan	0	0	1	1
Totals (8 entries)		24	26	22	72

=== 5,000 m ===
Year	Gold	Silver	Bronze
1996	(Germany) Claudia Pechstein	(Netherlands) Carla Zijlstra	(Italy) Elena Belci-Dal Farra
1997	(Germany) Gunda Niemann	(Netherlands) Carla Zijlstra	(Germany) Claudia Pechstein
1998	(Germany) Gunda Niemann-Stirnemann	(Germany) Claudia Pechstein	(Netherlands) Carla Zijlstra
1999	(Germany) Gunda Niemann-Stirnemann	(Germany) Claudia Pechstein	(Netherlands) Tonny de Jong
2000	(Germany) Gunda Niemann-Stirnemann	(Germany) Claudia Pechstein	(Netherlands) Tonny de Jong
2001	(Germany) Gunda Niemann-Stirnemann (5)	(Germany) Claudia Pechstein	(Japan) Maki Tabata
2003	(Germany) Claudia Pechstein (2)	(Canada) Clara Hughes	(Netherlands) Gretha Smit
2004	(Canada) Clara Hughes	(Netherlands) Gretha Smit	(Germany) Claudia Pechstein
2005	(Germany) Anni Friesinger	(Germany) Claudia Pechstein	(Canada) Clara Hughes
2007	(Czech Republic) Martina Sáblíková	(Germany) Claudia Pechstein	(Canada) Kristina Groves
2008	(Czech Republic) Martina Sáblíková	(Canada) Clara Hughes	(Canada) Kristina Groves
2009	(Czech Republic) Martina Sáblíková	(Canada) Clara Hughes	(Canada) Kristina Groves
2011	(Czech Republic) Martina Sáblíková	(Germany) Stephanie Beckert	(Germany) Claudia Pechstein
2012	(Czech Republic) Martina Sáblíková	(Germany) Stephanie Beckert	(Germany) Claudia Pechstein
2013	(Czech Republic) Martina Sáblíková	(Netherlands) Ireen Wüst	(Germany) Claudia Pechstein
2015	(Czech Republic) Martina Sáblíková	(Netherlands) Carlijn Achtereekte	(Germany) Claudia Pechstein
2016	(Czech Republic) Martina Sáblíková	(Netherlands) Carien Kleibeuker	(Netherlands) Irene Schouten
2017	(Czech Republic) Martina Sáblíková	(Germany) Claudia Pechstein	(Canada) Ivanie Blondin
2019	(Czech Republic) Martina Sáblíková (10)	(Netherlands) Esmee Visser	(Russia) Natalya Voronina
2020	(Russia) Natalya Voronina	(Czech Republic) Martina Sáblíková	(Netherlands) Esmee Visser
2021	(Netherlands) Irene Schouten	RSU Natalya Voronina	(Netherlands) Carlijn Achtereekte
2023	(Netherlands) Irene Schouten (2)	(Norway) Ragne Wiklund	(Czech Republic) Martina Sáblíková
2024	(Netherlands) Joy Beune	(Netherlands) Irene Schouten	(Czech Republic) Martina Sáblíková
2025	(Italy) Francesca Lollobrigida	(Norway) Ragne Wiklund	(Netherlands) Merel Conijn

Source: schaatsstatistieken.nl

Medal table

Rank	Nation	Gold	Silver	Bronze	Total
1	Czech Republic	10	1	2	13
2	Germany	8	9	6	23
3	Netherlands	3	8	8	19
4	Canada	1	3	5	9
5	Italy	1	0	1	2
5	Russia	1	0	1	2
7	Norway	0	2	0	2
8	Russian Skating Union	0	1	0	1
9	Japan	0	0	1	1
Totals (9 entries)		24	24	24	72

=== Mass start ===
Year	Gold	Silver	Bronze
2015	(Netherlands) Irene Schouten	(Canada) Ivanie Blondin	(Netherlands) Mariska Huisman
2016	(Canada) Ivanie Blondin	(South Korea) Kim Bo-reum	(Japan) Miho Takagi
2017	(South Korea) Kim Bo-reum	(Japan) Nana Takagi	(United States) Heather Bergsma
2019	(Netherlands) Irene Schouten	(Canada) Ivanie Blondin	(Russia) Elizaveta Kazelina
2020	(Canada) Ivanie Blondin (2)	(South Korea) Kim Bo-reum	(Netherlands) Irene Schouten
2021	(Netherlands) Marijke Groenewoud	(Canada) Ivanie Blondin	(Netherlands) Irene Schouten
2023	(Netherlands) Marijke Groenewoud	(Canada) Ivanie Blondin	(Netherlands) Irene Schouten
2024	(Netherlands) Irene Schouten (3)	(Canada) Ivanie Blondin	(Netherlands) Marijke Groenewoud
2025	(Netherlands) Marijke Groenewoud (3)	(Canada) Ivanie Blondin	(Italy) Francesca Lollobrigida

Source: schaatsstatistieken.nl

Medal table

Rank	Nation	Gold	Silver	Bronze	Total
1	Netherlands	6	0	5	11
2	Canada	2	6	0	8
3	South Korea	1	2	0	3
4	Japan	0	1	1	2
5	Italy	0	0	1	1
5	Russia	0	0	1	1
5	United States	0	0	1	1
Totals (7 entries)		9	9	9	27

=== Team pursuit ===
Year	Gold	Silver	Bronze
2005	Germany; Daniela Anschütz; Anni Friesinger; Sabine Völker	Canada; Kristina Groves; Clara Hughes; Cindy Klassen	Japan; Eriko Ishino; Nami Nemoto; Maki Tabata
2007	Canada; Kristina Groves; Christine Nesbitt; Shannon Rempel	Netherlands; Paulien van Deutekom; Renate Groenewold; Ireen Wüst	Germany; Daniela Anschütz-Thoms; Lucille Opitz; Claudia Pechstein
2008	Netherlands; Paulien van Deutekom; Renate Groenewold; Ireen Wüst	Canada; Kristina Groves; Christine Nesbitt; Brittany Schussler	Germany; Daniela Anschütz-Thoms; Lucille Opitz; Claudia Pechstein
2009	Canada; Kristina Groves (2); Christine Nesbitt; Brittany Schussler	Netherlands; Renate Groenewold; Jorien Voorhuis; Ireen Wüst	Japan; Masako Hozumi; Hiromi Otsu; Maki Tabata
2011	Canada; Cindy Klassen; Christine Nesbitt (3); Brittany Schussler (2)	Netherlands; Marrit Leenstra; Diane Valkenburg; Ireen Wüst	Germany; Stephanie Beckert; Isabell Ost; Claudia Pechstein
2012	Netherlands; Diane Valkenburg; Linda de Vries; Ireen Wüst	Canada; Cindy Klassen; Christine Nesbitt; Brittany Schussler	Poland; Natalia Czerwonka; Katarzyna Woźniak; Luiza Złotkowska
2013	Netherlands; Marrit Leenstra; Diane Valkenburg (2); Ireen Wüst	Poland; Katarzyna Bachleda-Curuś; Natalia Czerwonka; Luiza Złotkowska	South Korea; Kim Bo-reum; Noh Seon-yeong; Park Do-yeong
2015	Japan; Ayaka Kikuchi; Miho Takagi; Nana Takagi	Netherlands; Marije Joling; Marrit Leenstra; Ireen Wüst	Russia; Olga Graf; Yuliya Skokova; Natalya Voronina
2016	Netherlands; Antoinette de Jong; Marrit Leenstra; Ireen Wüst	Japan; Misaki Oshigiri; Miho Takagi; Nana Takagi	Russia; Olga Graf; Elizaveta Kazelina; Natalya Voronina
2017	Netherlands; Antoinette de Jong; Marrit Leenstra (3); Ireen Wüst	Japan; Misaki Oshigiri; Miho Takagi; Nana Takagi	Russia; Olga Graf; Yekaterina Shikhova; Natalya Voronina
2019	Japan; Ayano Sato; Miho Takagi; Nana Takagi	Netherlands; Joy Beune; Antoinette de Jong; Ireen Wüst	Russia; Elizaveta Kazelina; Evgeniia Lalenkova; Natalya Voronina
2020	Japan; Ayano Sato (2); Miho Takagi (3); Nana Takagi (3)	Netherlands; Antoinette de Jong; Melissa Wijfje; Ireen Wüst	Canada; Ivanie Blondin; Valérie Maltais; Isabelle Weidemann
2021	Netherlands; Antoinette de Jong; Irene Schouten; Ireen Wüst (6)	Canada; Ivanie Blondin; Valérie Maltais; Isabelle Weidemann	Russian Skating Union; Elizaveta Golubeva; Evgeniia Lalenkova; Natalya Voronina
2023	Canada; Ivanie Blondin; Valérie Maltais; Isabelle Weidemann	Japan; Momoka Horikawa; Sumire Kikuchi; Ayano Sato	United States; Giorgia Birkeland; Brittany Bowe; Mia Kilburg
2024	Netherlands; Joy Beune; Marijke Groenewoud; Irene Schouten (2)	Canada; Ivanie Blondin; Valérie Maltais; Isabelle Weidemann	Japan; Momoka Horikawa; Ayano Sato; Miho Takagi
2025	Netherlands; Joy Beune (2); Marijke Groenewoud (2); Antoinette Rijpma-de Jong (4)	Japan; Momoka Horikawa; Ayano Sato; Miho Takagi	Canada; Ivanie Blondin; Valérie Maltais; Isabelle Weidemann

Source: schaatsstatistieken.nl

Medal table

Rank	Nation	Gold	Silver	Bronze	Total
1	Netherlands	8	6	0	14
2	Canada	4	5	2	11
3	Japan	3	4	3	10
4	Germany	1	0	3	4
5	Poland	0	1	1	2
6	Russia	0	0	4	4
7	Russian Skating Union	0	0	1	1
7	South Korea	0	0	1	1
7	United States	0	0	1	1
Totals (9 entries)		16	16	16	48

=== Team sprint ===
Year	Gold	Silver	Bronze
2019	Netherlands; Janine Smit; Jutta Leerdam; Letitia de Jong	Canada; Kaylin Irvine; Heather McLean; Kali Christ	Russia; Angelina Golikova; Olga Fatkulina; Daria Kachanova
2020	Netherlands; Femke Kok; Jutta Leerdam; Letitia de Jong (2)	Russia; Angelina Golikova; Olga Fatkulina; Daria Kachanova	Poland; Andżelika Wójcik; Kaja Ziomek; Natalia Czerwonka
2021	Not included in the program		
2022	Held during the 2022 World Sprint Championships		
2023	Canada; Brooklyn McDougall; Carolina Hiller; Ivanie Blondin	United States; McKenzie Browne; Erin Jackson; Kimi Goetz	China; Zhang Lina; Jin Jingzhu; Li Qishi
2024	Canada; Carolina Hiller (2); Maddison Pearman; Ivanie Blondin (2)	United States; Sarah Warren; Erin Jackson; Brittany Bowe	Poland; Andżelika Wójcik; Iga Wojtasik; Karolina Bosiek
2025	Netherlands; Jutta Leerdam (3); Suzanne Schulting; Angel Daleman	Canada; Brooklyn McDougall; Béatrice Lamarche; Ivanie Blondin	Poland; Andżelika Wójcik; Kaja Ziomek-Nogal; Karolina Bosiek

Source: schaatsstatistieken.nl

Medal table

Rank	Nation	Gold	Silver	Bronze	Total
1	Netherlands	3	0	0	3
2	Canada	2	2	0	4
3	United States	0	2	0	2
4	Russia	0	1	1	2
5	Poland	0	0	3	3
6	China	0	0	1	1
Totals (6 entries)		5	5	5	15

== Medal summary ==
Updated after the 2025 World Championships.

=== Nations ===
Rank	Nation	Gold	Silver	Bronze	Total
1	Netherlands	47	41	38	126
2	Germany	36	32	18	86
3	Canada	19	21	21	61
4	Czech Republic	16	7	5	28
5	Japan	8	11	17	36
6	United States	8	10	13	31
7	South Korea	4	5	4	13
8	China	3	10	6	19
9	Russia	3	7	13	23
10	Norway	2	3	0	5
11	Austria	2	2	2	6
12	Russian Skating Union	1	1	4	6
13	Italy	1	0	2	3
14	Poland	0	1	4	5
15	Belarus	0	1	1	2
16	Kazakhstan	0	0	1	1
Totals (16 entries)		150	152	149	451

=== World champions ===
Skater	1st place, gold medalist(s)	2nd place, silver medalist(s)	3rd place, bronze medalist(s)	Total
(Czech Republic) Martina Sáblíková	16	7	4	27
(Netherlands) Ireen Wüst	15	15	1	31
(Germany) Anni Friesinger	12	9	1	22
(Germany) Gunda Niemann-Stirnemann	11	3	0	14
(Netherlands) Irene Schouten	8	2	5	15
(Canada) Christine Nesbitt	7	2	3	12
(Netherlands) Antoinette Rijpma-de Jong	6	5	2	13
(Japan) Miho Takagi	6	4	6	16
(Germany) Claudia Pechstein	5	13	12	30
(Canada) Ivanie Blondin	5	9	3	17
(Netherlands) Jutta Leerdam	5	2	3	10
(Netherlands) Joy Beune	5	1	1	7
(Netherlands) Marijke Groenewoud	5	0	1	6
(United States) Brittany Bowe	4	4	5	13
(Germany) Monique Garbrecht-Enfeldt	4	2	0	6
(Netherlands) Femke Kok	4	2	0	6
(Germany) Jenny Wolf	4	0	0	4
(Canada) Cindy Klassen	3	4	4	11
(Canada) Kristina Groves	3	3	7	13
(United States) Heather Richardson-Bergsma	3	3	3	9
(Japan) Nana Takagi	3	3	0	6
(South Korea) Lee Sang-hwa	3	2	2	7
(Netherlands) Marrit Leenstra	3	2	0	5
(Canada) Catriona Le May Doan	3	1	3	7
(Netherlands) Renate Groenewold	2	3	0	5
(Norway) Ragne Wiklund	2	3	0	5
(Netherlands) Marianne Timmer	2	2	3	7
(Japan) Nao Kodaira	2	2	2	6
(Japan) Ayano Sato	2	2	1	5
(Canada) Brittany Schussler	2	2	0	4
(Netherlands) Diane Valkenburg	2	2	0	4
(China) Wang Manli	2	1	0	3
(Netherlands) Jorien ter Mors	2	0	1	3
(Netherlands) Letitia de Jong	2	0	0	2
(Canada) Carolina Hiller	2	0	0	2
(Netherlands) Annamarie Thomas	2	0	0	2
(Canada) Clara Hughes	1	4	1	6
(Canada) Isabelle Weidemann	1	3	2	6
(Russia) Svetlana Zhurova	1	3	1	5
(Netherlands) Paulien van Deutekom	1	3	0	4
(Russia) RSU Olga Fatkulina	1	2	4	7
(Canada) Valérie Maltais	1	2	2	5
(Russia) RSU Angelina Golikova	1	2	1	4
(South Korea) Kim Bo-reum	1	2	1	4
(Austria) Vanessa Herzog	1	2	0	3
(Germany) Sabine Völker	1	2	0	3
(Russia) RSU Natalya Voronina	1	1	8	10
(United States) Chris Witty	1	1	1	3
(Canada) Brooklyn McDougall	1	1	0	2
(Germany) Daniela Anschütz-Thoms	1	0	3	4
(Austria) Emese Hunyady	1	0	2	3
(Netherlands) Linda de Vries	1	0	1	2
(Italy) Francesca Lollobrigida	1	0	1	2
(Netherlands) Angel Daleman	1	0	0	1
(Netherlands) Barbara de Loor	1	0	0	1
(Japan) Ayaka Kikuchi	1	0	0	1
(Canada) Maddison Pearman	1	0	0	1
(Canada) Shannon Rempel	1	0	0	1
(Netherlands) Suzanne Schulting	1	0	0	1
(Netherlands) Janine Smit	1	0	0	1
(China) Xue Ruihong	1	0	0	1

=== Silver medalists ===
Skater	2nd place, silver medalist(s)	3rd place, bronze medalist(s)	Total
(China) Wang Beixing	5	1	6
(Germany) Stephanie Beckert	3	2	5
(Japan) Maki Tabata	2	4	6
(Netherlands) Gretha Smit	2	2	4
(Netherlands) Carla Zijlstra	2	2	4
(Netherlands) Carlijn Achtereekte	2	1	3
(China) Han Mei	2	1	3
(Japan) Momoka Horikawa	2	1	3
(China) Yu Jing	2	1	3
(United States) Erin Jackson	2	0	2
(Japan) Misaki Oshigiri	2	0	2
(Netherlands) Tonny de Jong	1	3	4
(Russia) RSU Evgeniia Lalenkova	1	3	4
(United States) Jennifer Rodriguez	1	3	4
(Poland) Natalia Czerwonka	1	2	3
(United States) Kimi Goetz	1	1	2
(Netherlands) Marije Joling	1	1	2
(Russia) Daria Kachanova	1	1	2
(South Korea) Kim Min-sun	1	1	2
(Belarus) Anzhelika Kotyuga	1	1	2
(Netherlands) Esmee Visser	1	1	2
(Netherlands) Jorien Voorhuis	1	1	2
(Poland) Luiza Złotkowska	1	1	2
(Netherlands) Sandra Zwolle	1	1	2
(United States) McKenzie Browne	1	0	1
(Canada) Kali Christ	1	0	1
(Canada) Kaylin Irvine	1	0	1
(Japan) Sumire Kikuchi	1	0	1
(Netherlands) Carien Kleibeuker	1	0	1
(Canada) Béatrice Lamarche	1	0	1
(Canada) Heather McLean	1	0	1
(Japan) Kyoko Shimazaki	1	0	1
(Netherlands) Lotte van Beek	1	0	1
(Canada) Sarah Warren	1	0	1
(Netherlands) Melissa Wijfje	1	0	1

=== Bronze medalists ===
Skater	3rd place, bronze medalist(s)
(Russia) RSU Elizaveta Golubeva	6
(Russia) Olga Graf	3
(Japan) Tomomi Okazaki	3
(Germany) Franziska Schenk	3
(Poland) Andżelika Wójcik	3
(Netherlands) Margot Boer	2
(Poland) Karolina Bosiek	2
(Netherlands) Merel Conijn	2
(Netherlands) Annette Gerritsen	2
(Germany) Lucille Opitz	2
(Poland) Kaja Ziomek-Nogal	2
(Italy) Elena Belci-Dal Farra	1
(United States) Giorgia Birkeland	1
(Czech Republic) Karolína Erbanová	1
(Japan) Masako Hozumi	1
(Netherlands) Mariska Huisman	1
(Japan) Eriko Ishino	1
(China) Jin Jingzhu	1
(United States) Mia Kilburg	1
(China) Li Qishi	1
(Japan) Nami Nemoto	1
(South Korea) Noh Seon-yeong	1
(Netherlands) Thijsje Oenema	1
(Germany) Isabell Ost	1
(Japan) Sayuri Osuga	1
(Japan) Hiromi Otsu	1
(South Korea) Park Do-yeong	1
(Kazakhstan) Lyudmila Prokasheva	1
(China) Ren Hui	1
(Russia) Yekaterina Shikhova	1
(Russia) Yuliya Skokova	1
(Japan) Konami Soga	1
(Poland) Iga Wojtasik	1
(Poland) Katarzyna Woźniak	1
(China) Zhang Hong	1
(China) Zhang Lina	1
