= 2005 World Single Distance Speed Skating Championships =

International speed skating competition

World Single Distance Speed Skating Championships
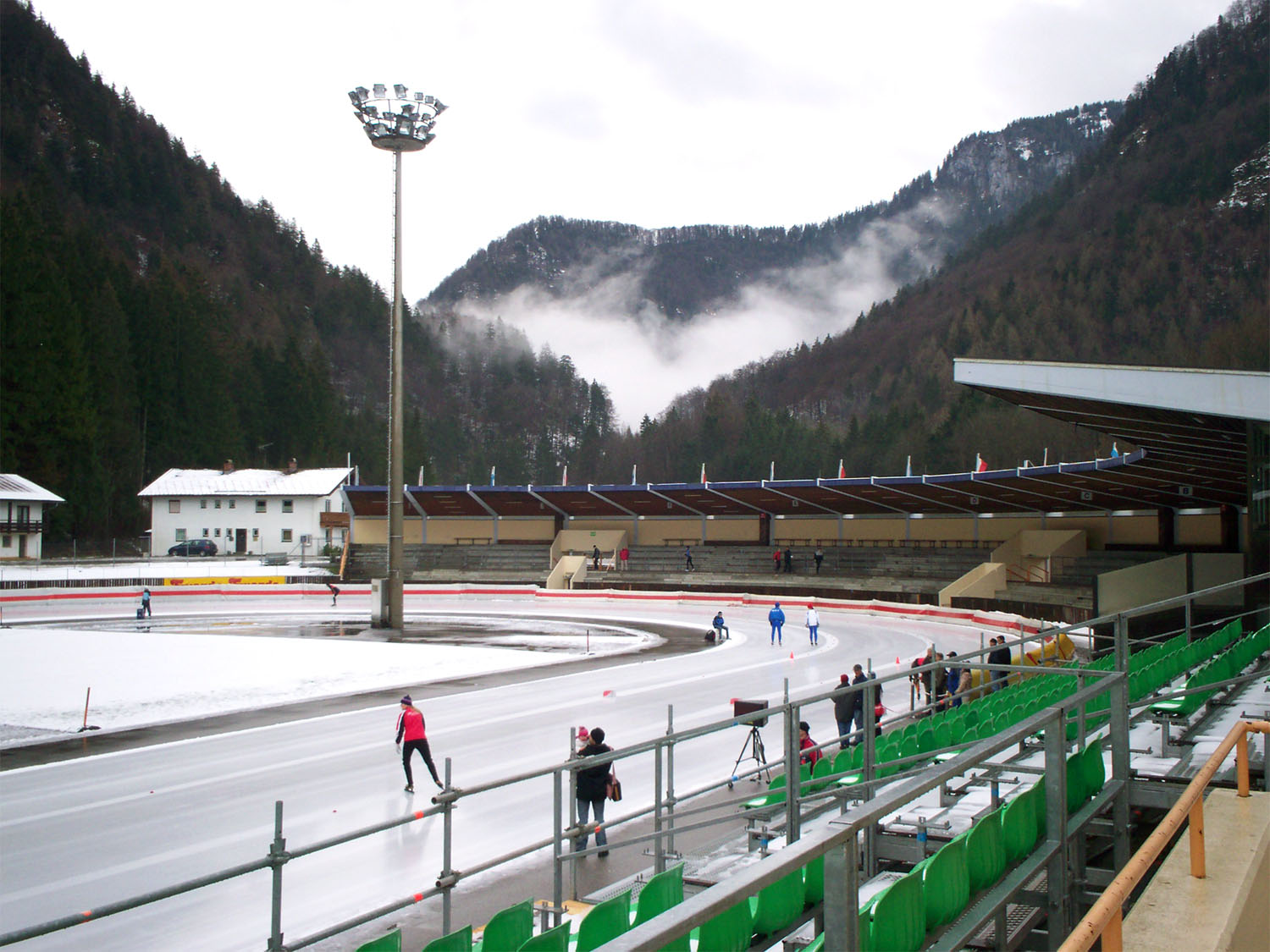
- Ludwig-Schwabl-Stadion (Inzell)
- Venue: Ludwig-Schwabl-Stadion (Inzell)
- Dates: 3–6 March 2005

The 2005 World Single Distance Speed Skating Championships were held between 3 and 6 March 2005 in the Ludwig-Schwabl-Stadion, Inzell, Germany.

== Schedule ==
| Date | Events |
|---|---|
| 3 March | 5000 m men |
| 3 March | 1500 m women |
| 4 March | 500 m men (1st) |
| 4 March | 3000 m women |
| 4 March | 500 m men (2nd) |
| 5 March | 500 m women (1st) |
| 5 March | 1000 m men |
| 5 March | 500 m women (2nd) |
| 5 March | 10000 m men |
| 5 March | Team pursuit women |
| 6 March | 1500 m men |
| 6 March | Team pursuit men |
| 6 March | 1000 m women |
| 6 March | 5000 m women |

== Medal summary ==
=== Men's events ===
| Event | Gold | | Silver | | Bronze | |
|---|---|---|---|---|---|---|
| 500 m | Joji Kato; Japan | 1:11.02; 35.57; 35.45 | Hiroyasu Shimizu; Japan | 1:11.46; 35.75; 35.71 | Jeremy Wotherspoon; Canada | 1:11.70; 35.87; 35.83 |
| 1000 m | Even Wetten; Norway | 1:10.10 | Jan Bos; Netherlands | 1:10.32 | Petter Andersen; Norway; Pekka Koskela; Finland | 1:10.63 |
| 1500 m | Rune Stordal; Norway | 1:50.69 | Mark Tuitert; Netherlands | 1:50.84 | Even Wetten; Norway | 1:51.63 |
| 5000 m | Chad Hedrick; United States | 6:25.61 | Bob de Jong; Netherlands | 6:30.53 | Carl Verheijen; Netherlands | 6:32.73 |
| 10000 m | Bob de Jong; Netherlands | 13:25.64 | Carl Verheijen; Netherlands | 13:26.97 | Chad Hedrick; United States | 13:30.88 |
| Team pursuit | Netherlands; Mark Tuitert; Carl Verheijen; Erben Wennemars | 3:53.83 | Italy; Matteo Anesi; Enrico Fabris; Ippolito Sanfratello | 3:55.18 | Norway; Petter Andersen; Odd Bohlin Borgersen; Eskil Ervik | 3:55.49 |

=== Women's events ===
| Event | Gold | | Silver | | Bronze | |
|---|---|---|---|---|---|---|
| 500 m | Wang Manli; China | 1:17.21; 38.92; 38.29 | Wang Beixing; China | 1:17.82; 38.69; 39.13 | Lee Sang-hwa; South Korea | 1:17.91; 38.93; 38.98 |
| 1000 m | Barbara de Loor; Netherlands | 1:18.24 | Anni Friesinger; Germany | 1:18.46 | Marianne Timmer; Netherlands | 1:18.71 |
| 1500 m | Cindy Klassen; Canada | 1:58.49 | Anni Friesinger; Germany | 1:58.73 | Jennifer Rodriguez; United States | 1:59.44 |
| 3000 m | Cindy Klassen; Canada | 4:10.37 | Claudia Pechstein; Germany | 4:10.89 | Kristina Groves; Canada | 4:11.97 |
| 5000 m | Anni Friesinger; Germany | 7:18.32 | Claudia Pechstein; Germany | 7:18.67 | Clara Hughes; Canada | 7:19.17 |
| Team pursuit | Germany; Daniela Anschütz; Anni Friesinger; Sabine Völker | 3:05.81 | Canada; Kristina Groves; Clara Hughes; Cindy Klassen | 3:07.01 | Japan; Eriko Ishino; Nami Nemoto; Maki Tabata | 3:12.05 |

== Medal table ==
| Rank | Nation | Gold | Silver | Bronze | Total |
|---|---|---|---|---|---|
| 1 | Netherlands (NED) | 3 | 4 | 2 | 9 |
| 2 | Germany (GER) | 2 | 4 | 0 | 6 |
| 3 | Canada (CAN) | 2 | 1 | 3 | 6 |
| 4 | Norway (NOR) | 2 | 0 | 3 | 5 |
| 5 | Japan (JPN) | 1 | 1 | 1 | 3 |
| 6 | China (CHN) | 1 | 1 | 0 | 2 |
| 7 | United States (USA) | 1 | 0 | 2 | 3 |
| 8 | Italy (ITA) | 0 | 1 | 0 | 1 |
| 9 | Finland (FIN) | 0 | 0 | 1 | 1 |
| 9 | South Korea (KOR) | 0 | 0 | 1 | 1 |
| Totals (10 entries) | | 12 | 12 | 13 | 37 |
