= Daniel Friberg (speed skater) =

Swedish speed skater

Personal information
- Nationality: Swedish
- Born: 10 July 1986 (age 39) Motala, Sweden

Sport
- Sport: Speed skating
Medal record
Representing Sweden
Men's speed skating
World Single Distance Championships
Silver medal – second place	2009 Vancouver	Team pursuit

Daniel Friberg (born 10 July 1986) is a Swedish former professional speed skater. He competed in two events at the 2010 Winter Olympics and won a silver medal in the team pursuit at the 2009 World Single Distance Speed Skating Championships. He retired from the sport in October 2011 after suffering an injury during training.
