= Anni Friesinger-Postma =

German speed skater (born 1977)

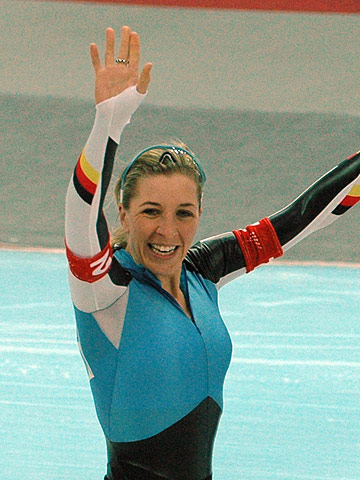
- Anni Friesinger at the 2006 Winter Olympics

Personal information
- Nationality: German
- Born: 11 January 1977 (age 49) Bad Reichenhall, West Germany
- Height: 1.69 m (5 ft 7 in)
- Weight: 64 kg (141 lb)
- Spouse: Ids Postma (2009)

Sport
- Country: Germany
- Sport: Speed skating
- Turned pro: 1993
- Coached by: Gianni Romme
- Retired: 2010
Medal record
Speed skating
Representing Germany
Event	1st	2nd	3rd
Olympic Games	3	0	2
World Allround	3	1	1
World Distance	12	9	1
World Sprint	1	2	0
European Allround	5	1	0
Total	24	13	4
Olympic Games
Gold medal – first place	2002 Salt Lake City	1500 m
Gold medal – first place	2006 Turin	Team pursuit
Gold medal – first place	2010 Vancouver	Team pursuit
Bronze medal – third place	2006 Turin	1000 m
Bronze medal – third place	1998 Nagano	3000 m
World Allround Championships
Gold medal – first place	2001 Budapest	Allround
Gold medal – first place	2002 Heerenveen	Allround
Gold medal – first place	2005 Moscow	Allround
Silver medal – second place	2007 Heerenveen	Allround
Bronze medal – third place	1998 Heerenveen	Allround
World Sprint Championships
Gold medal – first place	2007 Hamar	Sprint
Silver medal – second place	2004 Nagano	Sprint
Silver medal – second place	2008 Heerenveen	Sprint
World Single Distance Championships
Gold medal – first place	1998 Calgary	1500 m
Gold medal – first place	2001 Salt Lake City	1500 m
Gold medal – first place	2003 Berlin	1000 m
Gold medal – first place	2003 Berlin	1500 m
Gold medal – first place	2003 Berlin	3000 m
Gold medal – first place	2004 Seoul	1000 m
Gold medal – first place	2004 Seoul	1500 m
Gold medal – first place	2005 Inzell	5000 m
Gold medal – first place	2005 Inzell	Team pursuit
Gold medal – first place	2008 Nagano	1000 m
Gold medal – first place	2008 Nagano	1500 m
Gold medal – first place	2009 Vancouver	1500 m
Silver medal – second place	1997 Warsaw	1500 m
Silver medal – second place	1997 Warsaw	3000 m
Silver medal – second place	2000 Nagano	1500 m
Silver medal – second place	2001 Salt Lake City	3000 m
Silver medal – second place	2004 Seoul	3000 m
Silver medal – second place	2005 Inzell	1000 m
Silver medal – second place	2005 Inzell	1500 m
Silver medal – second place	2007 Salt Lake City	1000 m
Silver medal – second place	2009 Vancouver	1000 m
Bronze medal – third place	1998 Calgary	3000 m

Anna "Anni" Christine Friesinger-Postma (born 11 January 1977) is a German former speed skater. Her father Georg Friesinger, of Germany, and mother Janina ("Jana") Korowicka, of Poland, were both skaters; Jana was on the Polish team at the 1976 Winter Olympics. Her brother Jan is also a speed skater. Her sister Agnes is a former speed skater. In July 2010, Friesinger retired from her active sports career when she had to be treated for severe cartilage damage in her right knee joint.

On 11 August 2009 Friesinger married former Dutch skater Ids Postma, her long-term boyfriend, at Schloss Mirabell. The celebration took place at Schloss Aigen. As of November 2013, Friesinger lives in Salzburg, Austria, and is planning to move to the Netherlands to live with Postma on his farm in Dearsum. In August 2011 she gave birth to a daughter. In May 2014, her second daughter was born.

== Sports merits ==
=== Championships ===
Friesinger has won five Olympic medals; gold at the 1500 m in the 2002 Winter Olympics and the team pursuit in the 2006 and 2010 Winter Olympics as well as bronze at the 3000 m in the 1998 Winter Olympics and the 1000 m in the 2006 Winter Olympics. She managed to qualify for the German speed skating team in five events at the 2006 Winter Olympics: the team pursuit and the individual races at 1000 m, 1500 m, 3000 m, and 5000 meters. However, she failed to win gold in any individual events. In the team pursuit semifinal against the United States at the 2010 Olympics, she fell behind her team members and ended up sliding across the finish line on her belly, but Germany still succeeded in advancing to the final.

As well as being a five-time European Allround Champion and three time, World Allround Champion, Friesinger has won numerous titles in the World Single Distance Championships. Although she originally specialized in the longer distances, she also won the World Sprint Championships in 2007. In this, Friesinger became the fifth skater in history to be a World Champion in both Allround and Sprint disciplines (along with Sylvia Burka, CAN (1976 and 1977); Eric Heiden, U.S. (1977 and 1977); Natalya Petrusyova, URS (1980 and 1982); and Karin Kania-Enke, GDR (1980 and 1982)).

== Records ==
=== Personal records ===
Friesinger has set the world record at the 1500 m distance four times during her career, but the record has since been superseded by Canadian competitor Cindy Klassen.

Personal records
Distance	Time (min:sec.dec)	Event	Place	Date
500 m	38.09	2nd World Cup meet 2005–06	Salt Lake City – Kearns	18 November 2005
1000 m	1:13.49	2nd World Cup meet 2007–08	Calgary	18 November 2007
1500 m	1:53.19	2nd World Cup meet 2005–06	Salt Lake City – Kearns	20 November 2005
3000 m	3:58.52	1st World Cup meet 2005–06	Calgary	12 November 2005
5000 m	6:58.39	2002 Winter Olympics	Salt Lake City – Kearns	23 February 2002

Source: SpeedskatingResults.com

She is currently in 9th position in the adelskalender.

=== World records ===
Event	Time	Date	Venue
1500 m	1:56.95	29 March 1998	Calgary
1500 m	1:54.38	4 March 2001	Calgary
1500 m	1:54.02	20 February 2002	Salt Lake City
1500 m	1:53.22	6 November 2005	Calgary

Source: SpeedSkatingStats.com

== Non-sport activities ==
Friesinger has done some modeling work as a sideline, and she has appeared as a swimsuit model in several publications. She is known for her thighs, as befits a champion speed skater.

== Autobiography ==
- Mein Leben, mein Sport, meine besten Fitness-Tipps ("My Life, My Sport, My Best Fitness Tips"). March 2004, Goldmann. ISBN 3-442-39059-1 (in German).

Awards
Preceded by (Netherlands) Jochem Uytdehaage	Oscar Mathisen Award; 2003	Succeeded by (United States) Chad Hedrick
