= Cindy Klassen =

Canadian speed skater (born 1979)

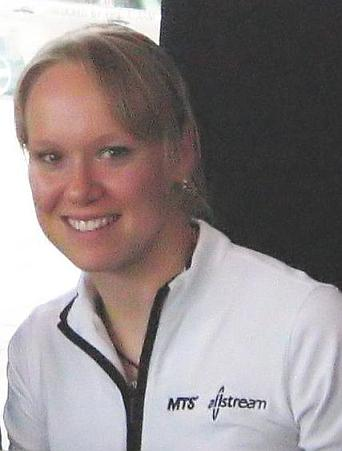

Personal information
- Born: August 12, 1979 (age 47) Winnipeg, Manitoba, Canada
- Height: 1.72 m (5 ft 8 in)
- Weight: 71 kg (157 lb; 11.2 st)
- Website: cindyklassen.com

Sport
- Country: Canada
- Sport: Speed skating
Medal record
Women's speed skating
Representing Canada
Olympic Games
Gold medal – first place	2006 Turin	1500 m
Silver medal – second place	2006 Turin	Team pursuit
Silver medal – second place	2006 Turin	1000 m
Bronze medal – third place	2002 Salt Lake City	3000 m
Bronze medal – third place	2006 Turin	5000 m
Bronze medal – third place	2006 Turin	3000 m
World Allround Championships
Gold medal – first place	2003 Gothenburg	Allround
Gold medal – first place	2006 Calgary	Allround
Silver medal – second place	2002 Heerenveen	Allround
Silver medal – second place	2005 Moscow	Allround
Bronze medal – third place	2007 Heerenveen	Allround
World Sprint Championships
Silver medal – second place	2003 Calgary	Sprint
Bronze medal – third place	2007 Hamar	Sprint
World Single Distance Championships
Gold medal – first place	2005 Inzell	1500 m
Gold medal – first place	2005 Inzell	3000 m
Gold medal – first place	2011 Inzell	Team pursuit
Silver medal – second place	2004 Seoul	1500 m
Silver medal – second place	2005 Inzell	Team pursuit
Silver medal – second place	2007 Salt Lake City	1500 m
Silver medal – second place	2012 Heerenveen	Team pursuit
Bronze medal – third place	2001 Salt Lake City	1500 m
Bronze medal – third place	2003 Berlin	1000 m
Bronze medal – third place	2004 Seoul	1000 m
Bronze medal – third place	2007 Salt Lake City	3000 m

Cindy Klassen OM (born August 12, 1979) is a Canadian retired long track speed skater. She is a six-time medallist having achieved one gold, two silver, three bronze at the Winter Olympics.

She is the only Canadian Olympian to win five medals in a single Olympic Games and the first female speed skater to win five medals in a single Olympic Games at the 2006 Winter Olympics in Turin, Italy. She was the world record holder in the 1500 m for 10 years, from November 2005 to November 2015, and the world record holder in the 3000 m for over 13 years, from November 2005 to March 2019; neither record was broken until after she had retired from competition in June 2015. She also holds the Canadian record in the 5000 m. Klassen is the leader of the Adelskalender, which is the all-time world ranking for speed skating. In 2003, Klassen became the first Canadian in 27 years to win the overall title at the World Speed Skating Championships.

Klassen has several major awards and accolades to her name, including the Lou Marsh Trophy in 2006, which is awarded for Canada's best athlete of the year. Due to her accomplishments at the 2006 Winter Olympics and her many accomplishments throughout her career, Klassen was named to the Order of Manitoba. Klassen was awarded the Oscar Mathisen Award in 2006 for outstanding speed skating performance of the year. In 2007, she was named the Female Athlete of the Year at the Canadian Sports Awards. Klassen won the 2005 and 2006 Bobbie Rosenfeld Award as female athlete of the year as presented by the Canadian Press. She was also tipped as Speed Skating Canada's 2003, 2005, 2006 and 2007 Female Skater of the Year for long track speed skating. The Canadian Mint featured Klassen on a Canadian quarter in 2010 as part of their Olympic memories editions and as a recognition of her six Olympic medals.

== Career ==
Klassen started her sports career as an ice hockey player at Gateway Community Club in Winnipeg and played for the Canadian national youth team. When she was not selected for the 1998 Winter Olympics, she switched to speed skating, where she soon proved to be a natural talent.

Klassen missed the entire 2003–04 season due to a serious injury. She fell during training, collided with another skater, hit his skate, and as a result twelve tendons in her right arm were cut.

=== Record success ===
In 2006, she announced she would not carry the Canadian flag at the Opening Ceremony of the Winter Olympics in Turin, Italy, although she had not yet been asked. The flag was instead carried by women's ice hockey veteran Danielle Goyette.

Going into the 2006 Winter Olympics in Turin, Klassen was considered one of the favourites, following her allround title in 2003 and two world distance titles in 2005. Klassen started out by winning a silver in the 1000 m, narrowly missing out on gold. Klassen then became Olympic champion in the 1500 m. She followed this with a silver in the women's team pursuit and bronze in the 3000 m and 5000 m. Following her fifth and final medal of the Games on February 26, 2006, Klassen said of her success that "Going into the Games, I thought maybe the 1500 and 3000 would be my strong point and maybe I could get a medal in those. To come out with five, it's been better than expected and really a dream come true."

Klassen became the first Canadian to win five medals in one Olympic Games. With this achievement, she tied American Eric Heiden's record of five medals won by a speed skater at an Olympics (1980). At the same time, she overtook the previous Canadian record of most medals (three), set in 1984 by Gaétan Boucher. Klassen also became the first female speed skater to win five medals in a single Olympics, surpassing Lidiya Skoblikova's four medals in the 1964 Olympics. Combined with her bronze medal at the 2002 Winter Olympics, she became the first Canadian to win six career Olympic medals, surpassing the five medals of Marc Gagnon and Phil Edwards and matched in the same race by winner Clara Hughes at the same 2006 Winter Olympics.

She was named flagbearer for the closing ceremony. Her winning the largest number of medals at the Turin Olympics caused IOC president Jacques Rogge to call her the "woman of the games". The following day, February 27, Klassen signed the most lucrative endorsement deal ever for a Canadian amateur athlete, with Manitoba Telecom Services (MTS), estimated at $1 million. Klassen also signed an endorsement deal with McDonald's. On December 11, she was named as the winner of the Lou Marsh Trophy as Canadian athlete of the year, beating out the likes of Joe Thornton, Justin Morneau, Steve Nash and teammate Clara Hughes.

=== Surgery and the 2010 Olympics ===
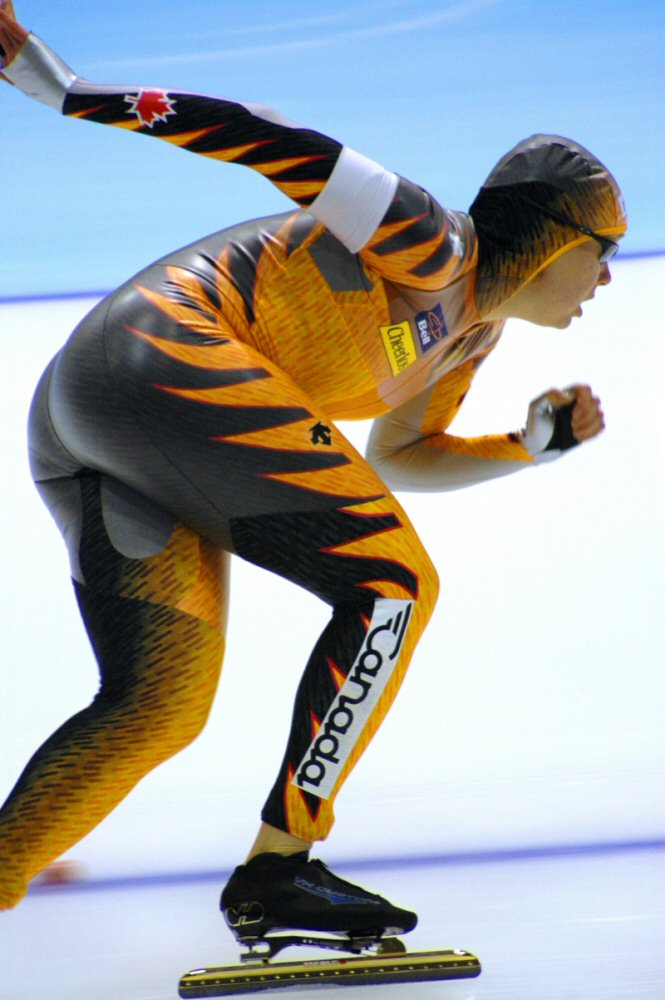
Cindy Klassen during the 2007 World Championships

In preparation for the 2010 Winter Olympics in Vancouver, Klassen decided not to participate in the fall races for the Speed Skating World Cup. She returned to competition in 2008 but decided to cut the skating season short in February 2008 after her sister was in a near-fatal accident. She also said that she would only focus on the World Single Distance Championships. Defending her all-around title and high World Cup classifications were not her main goal for the season. In July, Klassen had surgery to repair damage done to her knees over her skating career and in high school basketball. The surgeries would keep her from competing in the 2008–09 World Cup. Sometime later in 2009, her doctor discussed her knees, saying that:

These things don't go away, they're not cured. It's not like a broken bone that once it's healed it's back to good strength and can take stress. It's not like that. It's never going to be perfectly normal. It's not possible to get that.

He later added that the only way for her knees to stop degenerating would be for Klassen to give up speed skating.

The coloured version of the Canadian quarter depicting Klassen

On January 5, 2010, the Royal Canadian Mint announced that they were minting 22 million Canadian quarters with an image of Klassen in a speed skating pose on it. Three million of the quarters were minted with a red maple leaf on it. The mint issued the quarters as an honour to Klassen's six medals in the Olympics, and as part of their Olympic Moments quarter-coins series.

Coming back from double knee-surgery and two years off from skating, Klassen's main goal at the 2010 Winter Olympics in Vancouver was simply to compete. She said that "My goal is just to qualify. To get there would be great." She failed to medal in 2010, placing 21st in the 1500 m, 14th in the 3000 m, and 12th in the 5000 m. Klassen was also named as an alternate in the team pursuit. While Klassen stated that she was unsure of whether she would continue speed skating after the Games, she believed that her knees would hold out and that the 2014 Sochi Olympics were a possibility.

=== Return from injury and retirement ===
Klassen qualified for the 2010–11 World Cup in October 2010. Of qualifying, her ongoing injury struggles, and surgery recovery, Klassen said that:

I'm just going to go out and do the best that I can and see what happens. My knees still hurt. Some days are better than others. There's always aches and pains in skating . . . for me I feel like I'm more of a work skater than technical skater. I've been able to do harder training this year than I have in the past, which is a good thing because that's kind of my strong point so I'll see where that takes me. It's been fun but it's been really hard, too.

At the first meet of the World Cup season, Klassen got her first individual podium result since the 2007–08 season, finishing second in the 3000 m and following that with a fourth-place finish in the 1500 m the next day.

Despite the pain and fatigue from injuries, Klassen became a member of the women's team pursuit team that first won gold at the 2011 World Championships and then came back at the 2012 Worlds to win a silver as repeat medallists. That same season she had also helped to pull the women to the top of the World Cup title, winning three of four races that year together with Brittany Schussler and Christine Nesbitt.

She retired in June 2015 after the tail end of her career was hampered by injuries. Klassen issued a retirement interview stating "It's been an incredible honour to represent Canada in speed skating for 15 years. Speed skating has been a blessing in my life. It has provided me with unbelievable experiences and has taught me many life lessons."

== Post-retirement from sports ==
After retirement from sports, she finished a degree in psychology and joined the Calgary Police Service as a constable.

== Civilian honours ==
Ribbon	Description	Post-nominal letters	Notes
	Order of Manitoba	OM	
	Queen Elizabeth II Diamond Jubilee Medal		Canadian version

=== Medals ===
- 2002
  - Bronze medal 3000 m at the Winter Olympics in Salt Lake City
- 2003
  - World allround champion
- 2005
  - World champion 1500 m and 3000 m at the World Single Distance Championships
  - Silver medal at the World allround championships
- 2006
  - Gold medal and Olympic champion 1500 m at the Winter Olympics in Turin
  - Bronze medal 3000 m at the Winter Olympics in Turin
  - Silver medal Team Pursuit at the Winter Olympics in Turin
  - Silver medal 1000 m at the Winter Olympics in Turin
  - Bronze medal 5000 m at the Winter Olympics in Turin
  - World allround champion
- 2007
  - Bronze medal at the WM Sprint Championships
  - Bronze medal at the World allround championships

=== Awards ===
- 2005
  - Winner of the Bobbie Rosenfeld Award as Canadian female Athlete of the Year
- 2006
  - Winner of the Lou Marsh Trophy as Canadian Athlete of the Year
  - Winner of the Bobbie Rosenfeld Award as Canadian female Athlete of the Year
- 2008
  - Featured on a special edition of the 2009 25 cent Canadian coin. She is one of the few living people (other than a reigning monarch) to be featured on coinage.
- 2017
  - Awarded the Order of Sport, marking induction into Canada's Sports Hall of Fame

== Records ==
On March 18, 2006, Cindy Klassen Set the women's 3000m world record in Calgary, Canada, which stood almost 13 years until March 2, 2019. Martina Sáblíková beat Klassen's time of 3:53.34 by 0.03 seconds at the Allround World Championships in Calgary. Cindy Klassen is the leader of the Adelskalender, the all-time world ranking.

Personal records
Women's speed skating
Event	Result	Date	Location	Notes
500 m	37.51	March 18, 2006	Olympic Oval, Calgary	
1000 m	1:13.11	March 25, 2006	Olympic Oval, Calgary	
1500 m	1:51.79	November 20, 2005	Utah Olympic Oval, Salt Lake City	Former world record Former Canadian record (2005–2020)
3000 m	3:53.34	March 18, 2006	Olympic Oval, Calgary	Former world record Current Canadian record (2006–)
5000 m	6:48.97	March 19, 2006	Olympic Oval, Calgary	Former Canadian record (2006–2019)
10000 m	15:17.63	March 25, 2002	Olympic Oval, Calgary	Current Canadian record (2005–)

=== World records ===
Event	Time	Date	Venue
Mini combination	155.576	March 15–17, 2001	Calgary
Small combination	159.723	January 25–26, 2003	Salt Lake City
1500 m	1:53.87	January 9, 2005	Salt Lake City
Small combination	159.605	January 8–9, 2005	Salt Lake City
1500 m	1:53.77	October 28, 2005	Calgary
3000 m	3:55.75	November 12, 2005	Calgary
1500 m	1:51.79	November 20, 2005	Salt Lake City (Note: Klassen held the 1500 m world record from January 9, 2005 to November 15, 2015 – with the exception of the 14 days (November 6 to 20, 2005) that Germany's Anni Friesinger held it.)
Small combination	157.177	January 21–22, 2006	Calgary
3000 m	3:53.34	March 18, 2006	Calgary
Small combination	154.580	March 18–19, 2006	Calgary
1000 m	1:13.46	March 24, 2006	Calgary
1000 m	1:13.11	March 25, 2006	Calgary
Sprint combination	149.305	March 24–25, 2006	Calgary
Mini combination	155.456	December 28–30, 2006	Calgary

Source: SpeedSkatingStats.com.

== See also ==
- List of multiple Olympic medalists at a single Games
- List of multiple Winter Olympic medalists
- German Canadian

== Notes ==
Awards
Preceded by Lori-Ann Muenzer	Bobbie Rosenfeld Award; 2005, 2006	Succeeded by Hayley Wickenheiser
Preceded by Steve Nash	Lou Marsh Trophy; 2006	Succeeded by Sidney Crosby
Preceded by (United States) Shani Davis	Oscar Mathisen Award; 2006	Succeeded by (Netherlands) Sven Kramer
