= Roger Strøm =

Norwegian speed skater

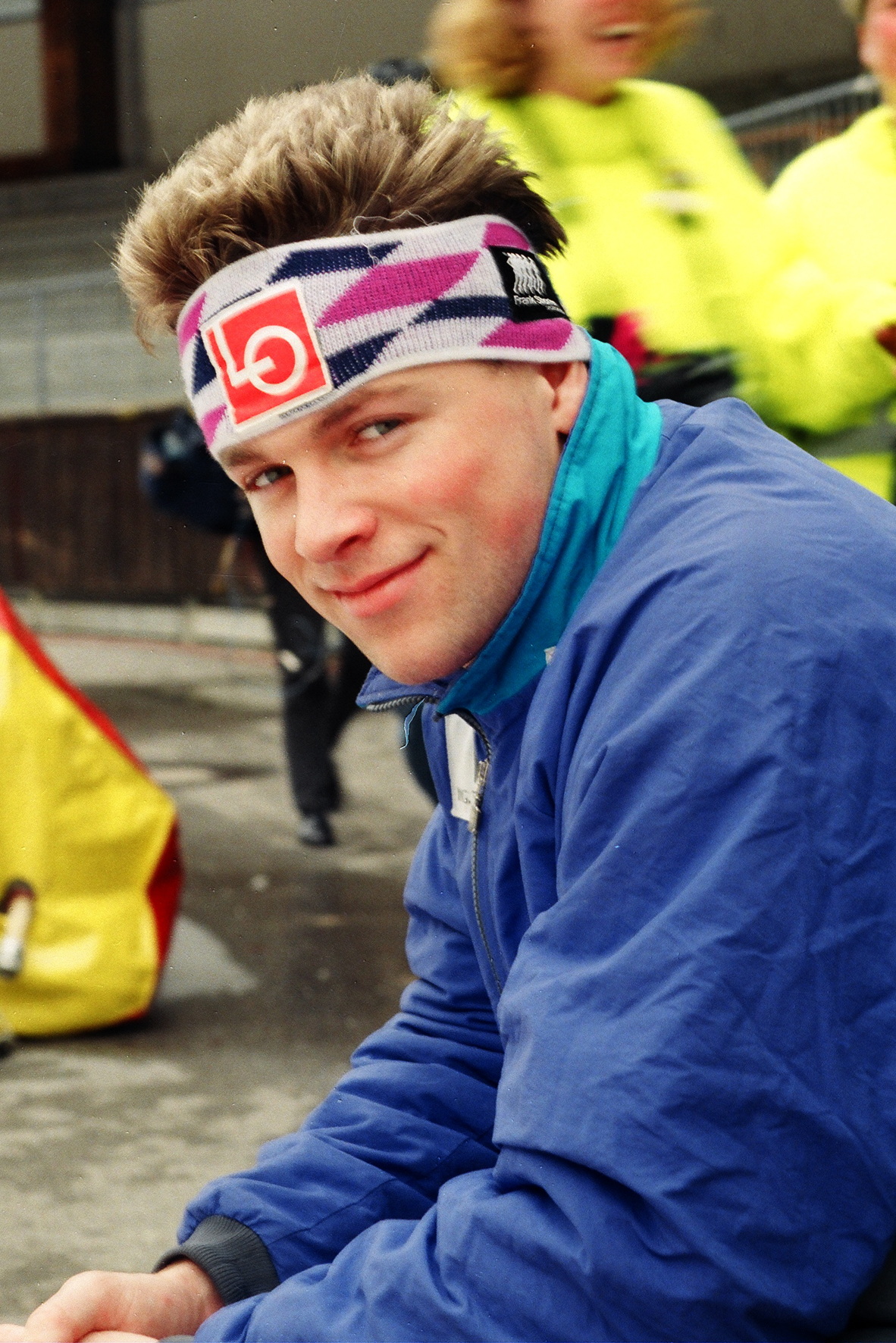

Personal information
- Born: 28 July 1966 (age 59) Sandefjord, Norway

Sport
- Country: Norway
- Sport: Speed skating
Medal record
World Sprint Championships
| Silver medal – second place | 1997 Hamar | Sprint |
World Single Distance Championships
| Silver medal – second place | 1997 Warsaw | 500 m |
| Bronze medal – third place | 1996 Hamar | 500 m |

Roger Strøm (born 28 July 1966 in Sandefjord) is a former Norwegian speed skater.

Strøm was Norway's best speed skating sprinter during the 1990s. His best seasons were from 1994 to 1997. During the 1994 Olympics he finished 7th over 1000 metres, but failed to qualify in the 500 m. His best world ranking was 2nd in the World Sprint Speed Skating Championships for Men in Hamar in 1997, and 3rd and 2nd over 500 m at the World Single Distance Championships for Men in 1996 and 1997.

He has in total 15 Norwegian titles; 6 over 500 m, 2 over 1000 m, and 7 in sprint. He set Norwegian records over 500 m three times, and twice over 1000 m. He was the first Norwegian to break the 37 second barrier over 500 m, and the first Norwegian under 1.15 over 1000 m. Strøm represented Sandefjord Skøyteklubb, Hovden Sportsklubb and Idrettsforeningen Fram, Larvik.

== Personal records ==
- 500 m – 35.98
- 1000 m – 1:12.08
- 1500 m – 2:05.40
