= 1997 World Single Distance Speed Skating Championships =

International speed skating competition

World Single Distance Speed Skating Championships
- Venue: Tor Stegny (Warsaw)
- Dates: 7–9 March 1997

The 1997 World Single Distance Speed Skating Championships were held between 7 and 9 March 1997 in the Tor Stegny, Warsaw, Poland.

== Schedule ==
Date	Events
March 7	5000 m men
March 7	500 m women (1st)
March 7	500 m women (2nd)
March 7	3000 m women
March 8	500 m men (1st)
March 8	500 m men (2nd)
March 8	1500 m men
March 8	1000 m women
March 8	5000 m women
March 9	1000 m men
March 9	10000 m men
March 9	1500 m women

== Medal summary ==
=== Men's events ===
Event	Gold		Silver		Bronze	
500 m	Manabu Horii; Japan	1:13.55; 37.08; 36.47	Roger Strøm; Norway	1:13.58; 37.00; 36.58	Hiroyasu Shimizu; Japan	1:13.97; 37.28; 36.69
1000 m	Ådne Søndrål; Norway	1:14.40	Jan Bos; Netherlands	1:14.81	Martin Hersman; Netherlands	1:05.07
1500 m	Rintje Ritsma; Netherlands	1:53.58	Ådne Søndrål; Norway	1:55.16	Neal Marshall; Canada	1:55.65
5000 m	Rintje Ritsma; Netherlands	7:02.34	Gianni Romme; Netherlands	7:03.22	Frank Dittrich; Germany	7:12.12
10000 m	Gianni Romme; Netherlands	14:18.75	Rintje Ritsma; Netherlands	14:30.60	Bob de Jong; Netherlands	14:33.82

=== Women's events ===
Event	Gold		Silver		Bronze	
500 m	Xue Ruihong; China	1:21.06; 40.75; 40.31	Sabine Völker; Germany	1:21.33; 40.61; 40.72	Franziska Schenk; Germany	1:21.91; 40.70; 41.21
1000 m	Marianne Timmer; Netherlands	1:21.31	Sandra Zwolle; Netherlands	1:21.92	Franziska Schenk; Germany	1:22.10
1500 m	Gunda Niemann-Stirnemann; Germany	2:04.43	Anni Friesinger; Germany	2:06.18	Marianne Timmer; Netherlands	2:07.54
3000 m	Gunda Niemann-Stirnemann; Germany	4:20.34	Claudia Pechstein; Germany	4:24.18	Carla Zijlstra; Netherlands	4:28.46
5000 m	Gunda Niemann-Stirnemann; Germany	7:19.85	Carla Zijlstra; Netherlands	7:25.80	Claudia Pechstein; Germany	7:30.84

=== Medal table ===
Rank	Nation	Gold	Silver	Bronze	Total
1	Netherlands (NED)	4	5	4	13
2	Germany (GER)	3	3	4	10
3	Norway (NOR)	1	2	0	3
4	Japan (JPN)	1	0	1	2
5	China (CHN)	1	0	0	1
6	Canada (CAN)	0	0	1	1
Totals (6 entries)		10	10	10	30
