= Neal Marshall =

Canadian speed skater

Neal Gregory Marshall (born June 13, 1969, in Victoria, British Columbia) is a Canadian speed skater. For the 1994–1995 season he was the winner at Speed Skating World Cup's 1500 m division. In 1997, he took bronze at the World Single Distance Championships for Men in the 1,500 m division. From March 16 to November 29, 1997, he held the world record for the 1,500 meter.

== World record ==
Event	Time	Date	Venue
1500 m	1.50,05	March 16, 1997	(Canada) Calgary

Source: SpeedSkatingStats.com
