= Clara Hughes =

Canadian speed skater

Clara Hughes OC, OM, MSC, OLY
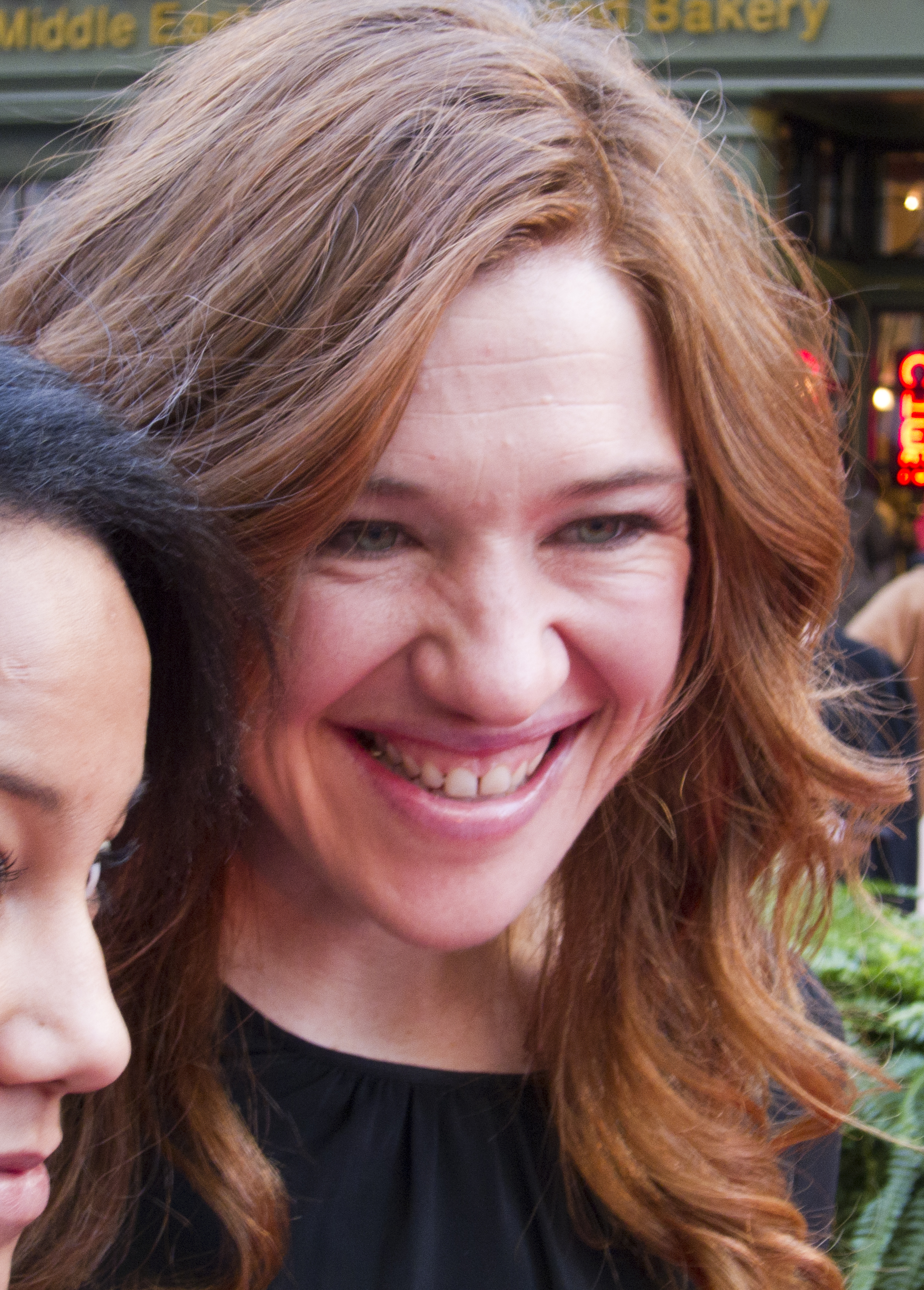
- Hughes at the induction ceremony of Canada's Walk of Fame in 2010

Personal information
- Nationality: Canadian
- Born: Clara Hughes; September 27, 1972 (age 54) Winnipeg, Manitoba, Canada
- Height: 176 cm (5 ft 9 in)
- Weight: 69 kg (152 lb)
- Spouse: Peter Guzman
- Website: clara-hughes.com

Sport
- Country: Canada
- Sport: Speed skating
- Retired: February 24, 2010 (speed skating)
Medal record
Representing Canada
Women's road cycling
Olympic Games
Bronze medal – third place	1996 Atlanta	Road race
Bronze medal – third place	1996 Atlanta	Time Trial
World Championships
Silver medal – second place	1995 Tunja	Time Trial
Commonwealth Games
Gold medal – first place	2002 Manchester	Time Trial
Pan American Games
Silver medal – second place	1995 Mar del Plata	Road Race
Silver medal – second place	2003 Santo Domingo	Time Trial
Bronze medal – third place	1995 Mar del Plata	Time Trial
Pan American Championships
Gold medal – first place	2011 Medellín	Road race
Gold medal – first place	2011 Medellín	Time Trial
Women's track cycling
Commonwealth Games
Bronze medal – third place	2002 Manchester	Points Race
Pan American Games
Gold medal – first place	2003 Santo Domingo	Points Race
Silver medal – second place	Havana 1991	Individual Pursuit
Women's speed skating
Olympic Games
Gold medal – first place	2006 Turin	5000 m
Silver medal – second place	2006 Turin	Team pursuit
Bronze medal – third place	2002 Salt Lake City	5000 m
Bronze medal – third place	2010 Vancouver	5000 m
World Single Distance Championships
Gold medal – first place	2004 Seoul	5000 m
Silver medal – second place	2003 Berlin	5000 m
Silver medal – second place	2008 Nagano	5000 m
Silver medal – second place	2009 Vancouver	5000 m
Silver medal – second place	2005 Inzell	Team pursuit
Bronze medal – third place	2005 Inzell	5000 m

Clara Hughes (born September 27, 1972) is a Canadian cyclist and speed skater who has won multiple Olympic medals in both sports. Hughes won two bronze in the 1996 Summer Olympics and four medals (one gold, one silver, two bronze) over the course of three Winter Olympics.

Hughes is one of the few athletes who have competed in both the Summer and Winter Olympic games. Hughes is one of only seven people to have podium finishes in the Winter and Summer versions of the Games, and is the only person ever to have won multiple medals in both. Hughes was the first Canadian woman to win a medal in road cycling at the Olympics, winning two in the 1996 Atlanta Olympics.

As a result of her success in multiple sports and her humanitarian efforts, Hughes was named to both the Order of Manitoba and as an Officer of the Order of Canada. She is involved with Right To Play, which is an athlete-driven international humanitarian organization that uses sports to encourage the development of youth in disadvantaged areas. After winning her gold medal in 2006, she donated $10,000 to Right to Play.

Throughout her career Hughes received a number of other awards, trophies, and accolades. She was named Female Athlete of the Year by Speed Skating Canada in 2004 for long track. In 2006, she received the International Olympic Committee's Sport and Community Trophy. She was then named to the 2006 List of Most Influential Women in Sport and Physical Activity by the Canadian Association for Advancement of Women and Sport (CAAWS). In the summer of the year 2010, it was announced that she would receive a star on the Canadian Walk of Fame and on November 15, 2010, she was inducted into Canada's Sports Hall of Fame.

== Career ==
Hughes was born in Winnipeg, and is a graduate of Elmwood High School. In an interview on CBC Radio show Definitely Not the Opera, Hughes reveals that as a youth, she smoked cigarettes, drank a lot at a young age and did a lot of drugs, admitting she did not envision herself as an athlete. She was inspired to begin skating after witnessing Gaétan Boucher at the 1988 Winter Olympics. She started with speed skating, but in 1990 she moved to competitive cycling, competing in track cycling and road cycling.

Hughes started speed skating at the age of 16, and then took up the sport of cycling at the age of 17. She would eventually return to the sport of speed skating at the age of 28, after achieving success in the 1996 Atlanta Olympics. With her experience and endurance earned through cycling, Hughes went on to a successful career competing in the 3,000 m and 5,000 m. This would eventually lead her to medal in these long-distance events at the Winter Olympics. She then returned to cycling, at the age of 38, to later successfully return for the 2012 London Olympics.

=== Cycling ===
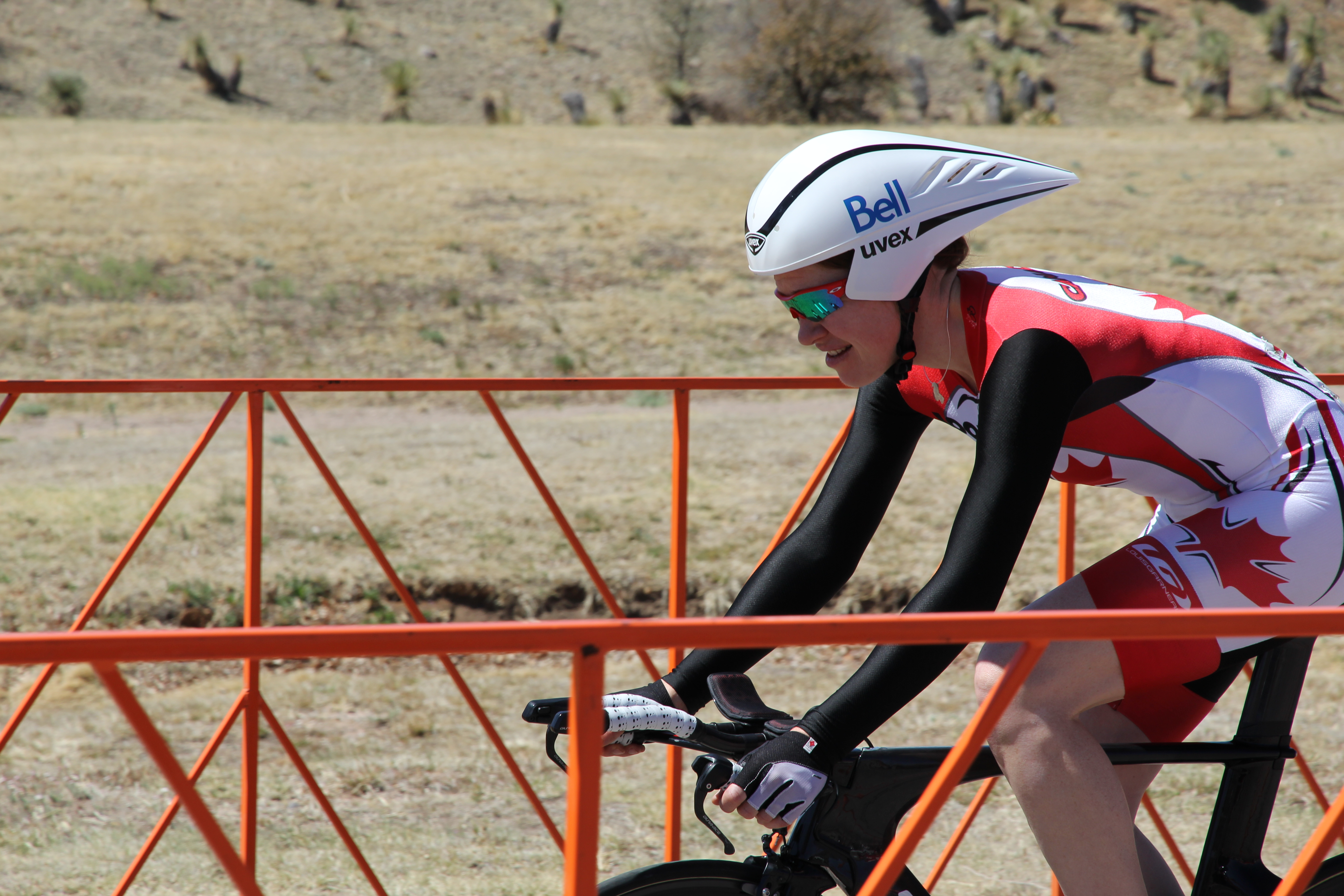
Hughes on 2011 Tour of the Gila

Hughes, an 18-time Canadian national cycling champion, won the silver medal at the 1995 World Cycling Championships (time trial).

She participated at the 1991, 1995, 1999 and 2003 Pan American Games and won eight Pan American Games medals. A participant at the 1990, 1994 and 2002 Commonwealth Games, Hughes won gold in the time trial (road, 2002), bronze in the points race on the velodrome (2002), and silver in the 50 km team time trial (1994, with Alison Sydor, Anne Samplonius, and Lesley Tomlinson).

Hughes participated in the 1996 and 2000 Summer Olympics, winning two bronze medals at the 1996 Olympics in Atlanta, in the individual road race and the individual time trial. These were the second and the third ever medals in road cycling for Canada, after Steve Bauer's silver medal at the 1984 Summer Olympics, and the first medals in cycling for a Canadian woman. As of 2011, these were the only three cycling medals for Canada.

A four-time participant of the women's Tour de France, Hughes has won the 1994 Women's Challenge and the 1995 Liberty Classic.

Hughes served as a commentator for cycling events for the CBC's coverage of the 2008 Summer Olympics in Beijing.

In November 2010, she announced a comeback, indicating her desire to race at the 2012 Summer Olympics. At the 2011 Pan American Championships, Hughes won the individual time trial and road race, both by a big margin. In May 2011, she took first in the Tour of the Gila, winning two stages. In July 2011, she finished first in the inaugural Crusher in the Tushar in Beaver, Utah. At the Chrono Gatineau time trials in May 2011, she finished first among an international slate of riders. In June 2012, she was selected to become part of Canada's 2012 London Olympics team, as one of four in cycling, with two other women and a man. She finished 32nd, with the peloton, in the road race and finished 5th in the road time trial at the 2012 Olympics.

== Major results ==
1992
1st National Road Race Championships
1994
1st Stage 3 Etoile Vosgienne
1st Prologue & Stage 9 Tour de l'Aude Cycliste Féminin
1st Overall Idaho International Challenge

1st Stages 3 & 5

1st Overall Women's Challenge
4th UCI Road World Championships – Women's time trial
1995
1st Liberty Classic
1st National Time Trial Championships
2nd UCI Road World Championships – Women's time trial
1996
5th UCI Road World Championships – Women's time trial
1998
1st Stage 2 Tour de Snowy
1999
1st National Road Race Championships
7th UCI Road World Championships – Women's time trial
2000
1st Stage 5 Redlands Bicycle Classic
1st National Time Trial Championships
2002
1st Commonwealth Games Time Trial
2011
1st Pan American Championships Time Trial
1st Pan American Championships Road Race
1st La visite chrono du Gatineau
1st National Time Trial Championships
5th UCI Road World Championships – Women's time trial
2012
1st Stage 4b (TTT) Energiewacht Tour
1st La visite chrono du Gatineau
1st National Time Trial Championships

=== Long track speed skating ===
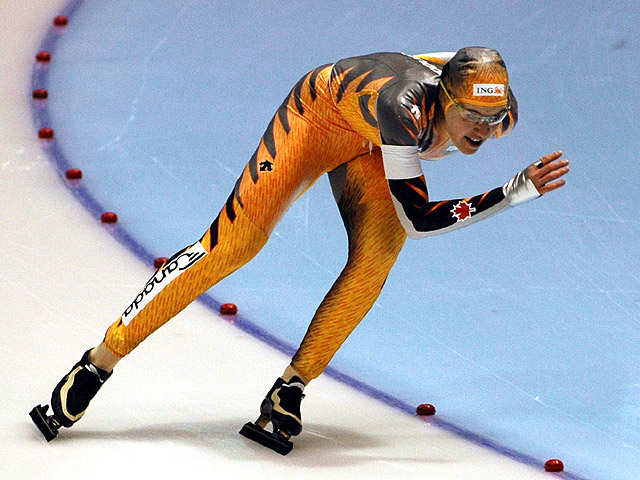
Hughes skating in 2007

In the 2000/2001 season, Hughes made a successful comeback to speed skating, participating in the World Single Distance Championships in Salt Lake City, where she finished 11th in the 3000 m.

The following season, she qualified for the 2002 Winter Olympics. After placing 10th in the 3000 m, she won the bronze medal in the 5000 m, just ahead of compatriot Cindy Klassen. With this, she became the second speed skater to win medals in the Summer and Winter Games — Christa Luding-Rothenburger won a gold in the 1000 m speed skating and silver in the 1000 m cycling sprint in 1988. She became the fourth person and second woman to win medals at the Summer and Winter Games. In 2006, she was the only Olympian to have won multiple medals at the Summer Games as well as at the Winter Games.

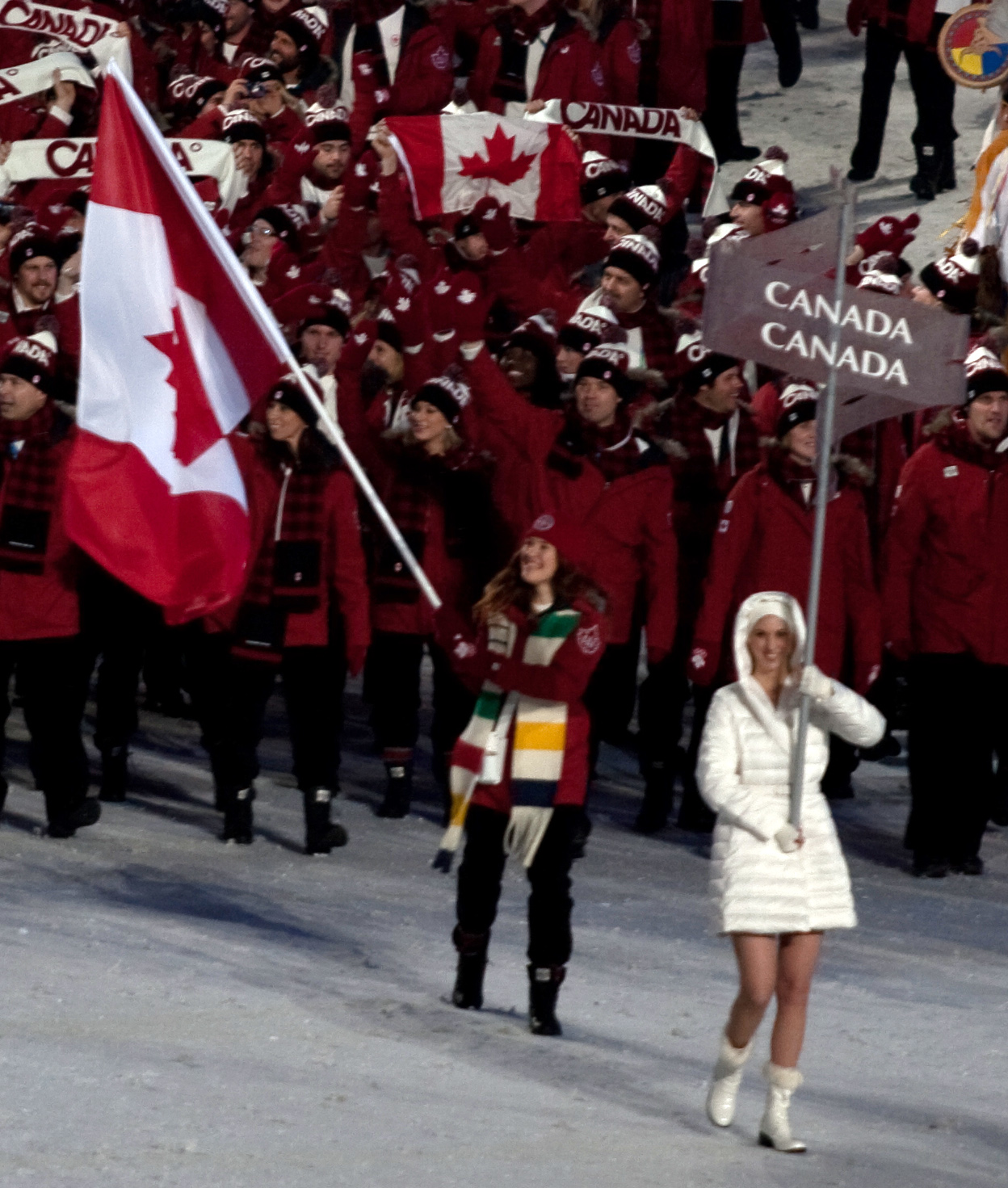
Led by Clara Hughes, the Canadian team enters BC Place during the opening ceremonies of the 2010 Winter Olympics.

In 2006, although she had not been asked, she announced she would not carry the Canadian flag during the opening ceremonies of the 2006 Winter Olympics in Turin, Italy. At those Olympics, she won her first gold medal in the 5000 m and a silver medal in the team pursuit as part of the Canadian team. She earned her fifth Olympic medal at the 2006 Games, tying the total all-time Canadian medal count record, also held by Marc Gagnon and Phillip Edwards. Klassen set a new record in the same games, winning five medals in Turin, for a total of six.

Inspired by Joey Cheek, who donated his gold medal bonus to Right to Play, Hughes donated $10,000 of her own money to Right to Play after her 2006 gold medal win in the 5000 m. (Canada did not give out medal bonuses at the time).

Hughes was also a world record holder on 10,000 m track with 14:19.73 on March 13, 2007, on the Olympic Oval in Calgary, which was beaten by Martina Sáblíková one year later. However, that time is still the Canadian record.

On January 29, 2010, she was announced as the Canadian Flag Bearer for the 2010 Winter Olympics in Vancouver. During the games she won a bronze medal in the 5,000 metres which was also the final Olympic speed skating race of her career. Her time of 6:55.73 became a new track record, though her time was soon beaten by Stephanie Beckert of Germany and gold medalist Martina Sáblíková of the Czech Republic. This brought her career medals total to six, tying teammate Cindy Klassen as the Canadian athlete with the most medals.

== Personal life ==
She is the national spokesperson for the Bell Canada 'Let's Talk Mental Health' initiative, including Bell 'Let's Talk Day'. Hughes uses her past struggles with depression to relate to others and to help combat issues including the stigma involved with mental health issues. "Hughes battled deep depression, which threatened to derail her life, after winning two bronze medals in cycling at the 1996 Olympics." Since 2013, Hughes has initiated annual bike rides across Canada in order to raise awareness about mental health. In 2015, a CTV-produced documentary Clara's Big Ride premiered on the fifth annual Bell Let's Talk Day (a national mental health awareness day in Canada). Her first memoir, Open Heart, Open Mind, was published in 2015. Her second memoir, Learning to Breathe, was published in 2026 by Simon and Schuster.

== Personal bests ==
Personal records
Women's speed skating
Event	Result	Date	Location	Notes
500 m	41.19	12 October 2006	Calgary	
1000 m	1:18.74	23 December 2006	Calgary	
1500 m	1:57.46	20 November 2005	Salt Lake City	
3000 m	3:59.06	18 November 2005	Salt Lake City	
5000 m	6:53.53	13 January 2008	Calgary	
10000m	14:19.73	11 March 2005	Calgary	Current Canadian Record; Former World Record
Women's cycling
Event	Result	Date	Location	Notes

- All information from Speed Skating Canada records page and Clara Hughes's SSC profile

== Civilian honours ==
Ribbon	Description	Post-nominal letters	Notes
	Order of Canada	OC	
	Order of Manitoba	OM	
	Queen Elizabeth II Diamond Jubilee Medal		Canadian version

In 2006, she was awarded the Order of Manitoba, and in 2007, she was made a Member of the Order of Canada.

On May 23, 2008, she was awarded an Honorary Doctorate of Law from the University of Manitoba.

In 2008, Hughes was named an in motion Champion by the province of Manitoba.

On February 12, 2010, she was the Canadian Olympic Team flag bearer for the Opening Ceremonies of the 2010 Olympic Winter Games in Vancouver.

On April 7, 2010, she was made an officer of the Order of Canada.

On June 8, 2010, it was announced that she would receive a star on Canada's Walk of Fame.

On September 23, 2010, she received an honorary degree from the University of New Brunswick in a special Toronto ceremony.

On November 15, 2010, Hughes was inducted into Canada's Sports Hall of Fame.

On January 16, 2012, The Canadian Association for the Advancement of Women and Sport and Physical Activity (CAAWS) announced Hughes as one of twenty women selected to the Most Influential Women in Sport and Physical Activity list (MIW) for 2011. The objective of the list is to focus on women who are leaders and role models making a difference on the Canadian or international scene. The women on the MIW are influential women who contributed in a significant way to sport and physical activity in the year 2011. This is Clara Hughes third time on the CAAWS Most Influential Women List.

On April 27, 2013, the steep hill on Sydenham Road in Dundas, Ontario on which she trained for seven years was officially renamed 'Clara's Climb'. There is a plaque there in her honour describing her training and accomplishments.

In 2014, Hughes received the Loyola Medal from Concordia University.

On June 30, 2014, Hughes was honoured with the Meritorious Service Cross (Civil Division).

On January 29, 2015, the official opening ceremony was held for a school named after Hughes. Open since September 2014, the Clara Hughes Public School is located in Oshawa, Ontario. At the ceremony, Hughes said, "It is without exception the greatest honour that I have in my life, to have my name here."

On June 14, 2016, Hughes was awarded an Honorary Doctorate of Law from the University of Victoria.

== See also ==
- List of Olympians who won medals in the Summer and Winter Games
- Georgia Simmerling, Canadian female cyclist who competed at Summer and Winter Olympics
- List of Canadian sports personalities
- List of multi-sport athletes

Olympic Games
Preceded by Adam van Koeverden	Flagbearer for Canada; 2010 Vancouver	Succeeded by Simon Whitfield
