= Sandra Zwolle =

Dutch speed skater

Personal information
- Born: 15 March 1971 (age 55) Heerenveen, the Netherlands
- Height: 1.74 m (5 ft 9 in)
- Weight: 65 kg (143 lb)

Sport
- Country: Netherlands
- Sport: Speed skating
- Club: Hardrijders Club Heerenveen
Medal record
World Championships
Silver medal – second place	1997 Warsaw	1000 m
Bronze medal – third place	1996 Hamar	1500 m

Sandra Kornelia Zwolle (born 15 March 1971) is a retired speed skater from the Netherlands who was active between 1988 and 1999. She competed at the 1998 Winter Olympics in the 500 m and 1000 m and finished in 17th and 15th place, respectively. She won a bronze medal in the 1500 m at the world championships in 1996 and a silver medal in the 1000 m in 1997. Nationally, she won the 1000 m in 1995 and 1996 and collected more than ten silver and bronze medals in various disciplines between 1991 and 1999.

After retirement from competitions she worked as a sports commentator at the Thialf ice arena.

Personal bests:

- 500 m – 39.88 (1998)
- 1000 m – 1:17.69 (1998)
- 1500 m – 2:02.74 (1996)
- 3000 m – 4:31.25 (1996)
- 5000 m – 8:01.01 (1992)
