= Odd Borgersen =

Norwegian long track speed skater

Odd Bohlin Borgersen (born 10 April 1980) is a Norwegian long track speed skater who participates in international competitions.

== Personal records ==
Personal records
Men's Speed skating
Event	Result	Date	Location	Notes
500 m	37.73	2006-03-21	Calgary	
1,000 m	1:13.48	2005-10-31	Calgary	
1,500 m	1:49.57	2005-03-10	Calgary	
3,000 m	3:47.24	2005-11-05	Calgary	
5,000 m	6:19.20	2005-11-19	Salt Lake City	
10,000 m	13:15.67	2005-03-10	Calgary	

=== Career highlights ===
World Single Distance Championships
2005 - Inzell, 5th at 5000 m
2005 - Inzell, 5th at 10000 m
2005 - Inzell, (bronze) 3rd at team pursuit
European Allround Championships
2008 - Kolomna, 19th
World Junior Allround Championships
1999 - Geithus, 24th
National Championships
2002 - Hundorp, (silver) 2nd at 5000 m
2003 - Geithus, (bronze) 3rd at 10000 m
2004 - Oslo, (silver) 2nd at allround
2005 - Larvik, (silver) 2nd at 10000 m
2006 - Arendal, (bronze) 3rd at allround
Nordic Neo Senior Games
2002 - Geithus, (bronze) 3rd at 10000 m
