= Franziska Schenk =

German speed skater

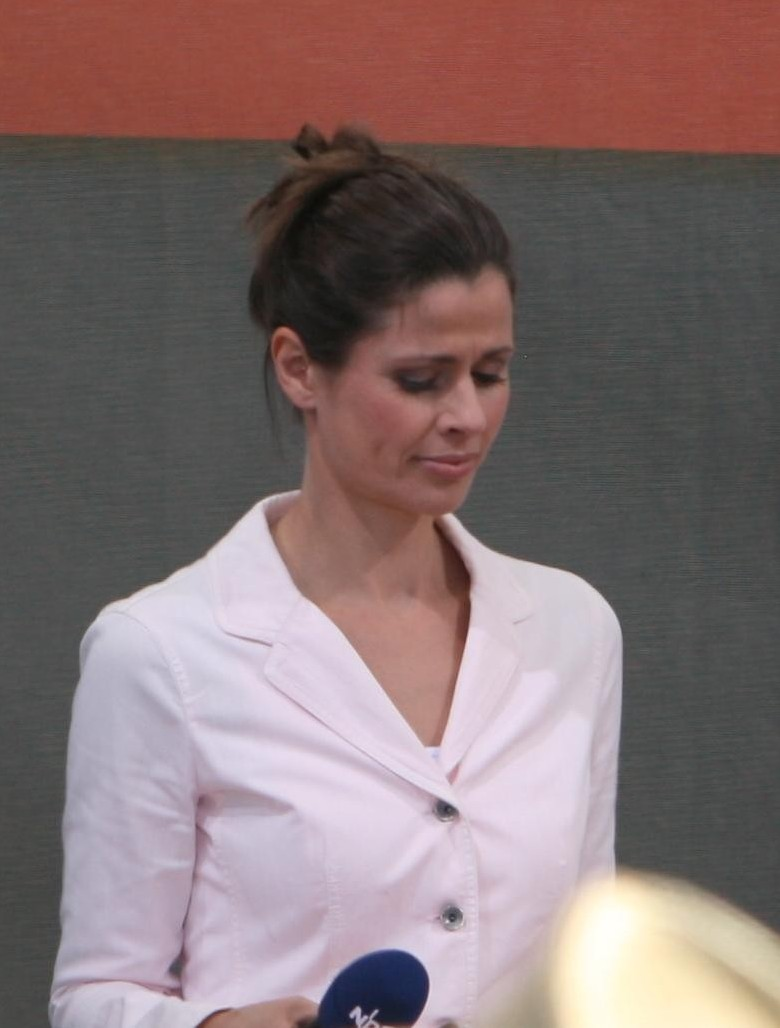
- Schenk in 2012

Personal information
- Born: 13 March 1974 (age 52) Erfurt, East Germany

Sport
- Country: Germany
- Sport: Speed skating
Medal record
Women's speed skating
Olympic Games
Bronze medal – third place	1994 Lillehammer	500 m
World Sprint Championships
Gold medal – first place	1997 Hamar	Sprint
Bronze medal – third place	1995 Milwaukee	Sprint
Bronze medal – third place	1996 Heerenveen	Sprint

Franziska Schenk (born 13 March 1974) is a former German speed skater. She was a specialist in the sprint distances (500 and 1000 m). At the 1994 Winter Olympics in Lillehammer, she won a bronze on the 500 m in Vikingskipet at Hamar. After that she won the bronze medal in the Sprint World Championships in 1995 and 1996, she won overall in 1997, also in Vikingskipet. At the World Allround she won three bronze medals, two in 1997 and one in 1998. In addition she won 11 World Cup victories during her career.
