= Petter Andersen =

Norwegian speed skater

Personal information
- Born: 2 January 1974 (age 52) Oslo, Norway
- Height: 1.72 m (5 ft 7 1/2 in)
- Weight: 70 kg (154 lb)

Sport
- Country: Norway
- Sport: Men's speed skating

Petter Andersen (born 2 January 1974) is a Norwegian speed skater. He was born in Oslo and represented the club Aktiv SK. He competed in the 1,000 m and 1,500 m at the 2002 Winter Olympics in Salt Lake City, and at the 2006 Winter Olympics in Turin.
