= Rune Stordal =

Norwegian speed skater

Medal record

Men's speed skating

World Championships
Gold medal – first place	2005 Inzell	1500 m

Rune Stordal (born 8 April 1979 in Bergen) is a Norwegian speed skater.

He won the 1500 m at the 2005 World Single Distance Championships. This is his only international championship medal. He has competed for Norway in World Cup races since the 2001 season and has several Norwegian Championship medals, in the sprint and in the single distances.
