= Even Wetten =

Norwegian speed skater (born 1982)

Medal record

Representing Norway

Men's speed skating

World Championships
| Gold medal – first place | 2005 Inzell | 1,000 m |
| Bronze medal – third place | 2005 Inzell | 1,500 m |

Even Gabrielsen Wetten (born 12 August 1982 in Hamar) is a Norwegian speed skater. He became World Champion on 1,000 metres in 2005 in Inzell.

He retired 3 October 2007, only 25 years old, due to injuries and motivational issues.
