= 2009 World Single Distance Speed Skating Championships =

World Single Distance Speed Skating Championships
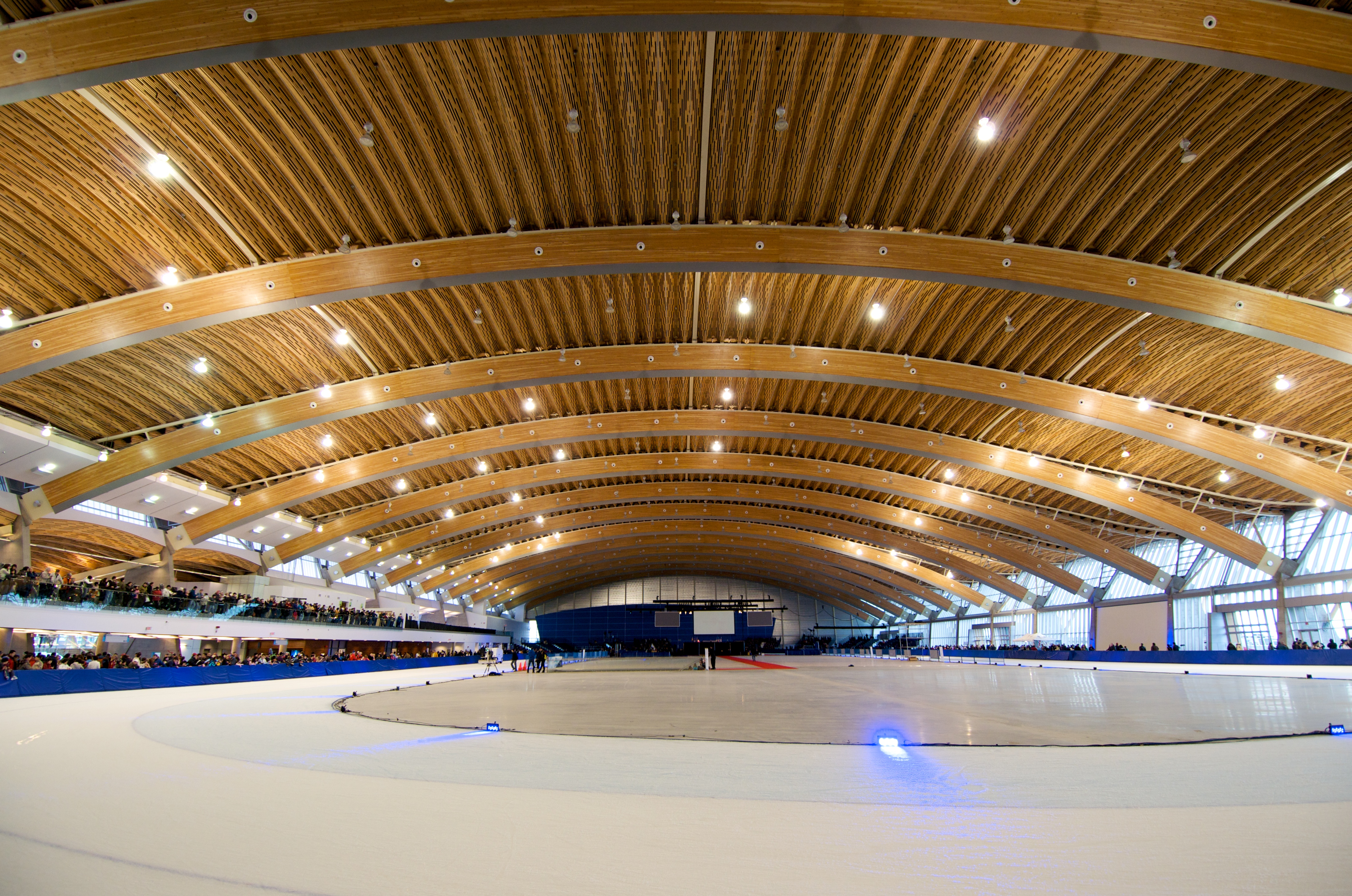
- Richmond Olympic Oval (Richmond)
- Venue: Richmond Olympic Oval (Richmond)
- Dates: 12, 13, 14 and 15 March 2009

The 2009 World Single Distance Speed Skating Championships were held between 12 March and 15 March 2009 in the Richmond Olympic Oval, Richmond, BC, Canada.

== Schedule ==
Date	Time	Events
March 12	12:30	1500 m men
March 12		3000 m women
March 13	12:30	1000 m men
March 13		1500 m women
March 13		5000 m men
March 14	12:30	1000 m women
March 14		10000 m men
March 14		5000 m women
March 15	12:30	500 m women (1st)
March 15		500 m men (1st)
March 15		500 m women (2nd)
March 15		500 m men (2nd)
March 15		Team pursuit women
March 15		Team pursuit men

== Medal summary ==
=== Men's events ===
Event	Gold		Silver		Bronze	
2 × 500 m	Lee Kang-seok; South Korea	69.730; 34.80; 34.93	Lee Kyou-hyuk; South Korea	69.920; 34.90; 35.02	Yu Fengtong; China	69.970; 35.06; 34.91
1000 m	Trevor Marsicano; United States	1:08.96; TR	Denny Morrison; Canada	1:09.00	Shani Davis; United States	1:09.02
1500 m	Shani Davis; United States	1:46.17; TR	Trevor Marsicano; United States	1:46.30	Denny Morrison; Canada	1:47.05
5000 m	Sven Kramer; Netherlands	6:16.20; TR	Håvard Bøkko; Norway	6:18.02	Trevor Marsicano; United States	6:20.06
10000 m	Sven Kramer; Netherlands	12:55.32; TR	Håvard Bøkko; Norway	13:03.95	Bob de Jong; Netherlands	13:13.16
Team pursuit	Netherlands; Sven Kramer; Wouter olde Heuvel; Carl Verheijen	3:41.26	Sweden; Joel Eriksson; Daniel Friberg; Johan Röjler	3:45.73	United States; Ryan Bedford; Brian Hansen; Trevor Marsicano	3:46.07

Note: TR = Track record

=== Women's events ===
Event	Gold		Silver		Bronze	
2 × 500 m	Jenny Wolf; Germany	75.750; 38.03; 37.72	Wang Beixing; China	75.870; 37.78; 38.09	Lee Sang-hwa; South Korea	76.390; 38.23; 38.16
1000 m	Christine Nesbitt; Canada	1.16,28; TR	Anni Friesinger; Germany	1.16,32	Margot Boer; Netherlands	1.16,44
1500 m	Anni Friesinger; Germany	1.58,66; TR	Ireen Wüst; Netherlands	1.58,83	Christine Nesbitt; Canada	1.58,88
3000 m	Renate Groenewold; Netherlands	4.05,43; TR	Martina Sáblíková; Czech Republic	4.05,50	Kristina Groves; Canada	4.06,46
5000 m	Martina Sáblíková; Czech Republic	6.57,84; TR	Clara Hughes; Canada	7.00,54	Kristina Groves; Canada	7.02,91
Team pursuit	Canada; Kristina Groves; Christine Nesbitt; Brittany Schussler	2:58.25	Netherlands; Jorien Voorhuis; Renate Groenewold; Ireen Wüst	3:02.02	Japan; Maki Tabata; Masako Hozumi; Hiromi Otsu	3:04.06

Note: TR = Track record

== Medal table ==
Rank	Nation	Gold	Silver	Bronze	Total
1	Netherlands (NED)	4	2	2	8
2	Canada (CAN)	2	2	4	8
3	United States (USA)	2	1	3	6
4	Germany (GER)	2	1	0	3
5	South Korea (KOR)	1	1	1	3
6	Czech Republic (CZE)	1	1	0	2
7	Norway (NOR)	0	2	0	2
8	China (CHN)	0	1	1	2
9	Sweden (SWE)	0	1	0	1
10	Japan (JPN)	0	0	1	1
Totals (10 entries)		12	12	12	36
