= Netherlands at the World Single Distance Championships =

- IOC code: NED
- Medals Ranked 1st: Gold 77 Silver 71 Bronze 59 Total 207

This page is an overview of the Netherlands at the World Single Distance Championships.

== List of medalists ==
Medal	Championship	Name	Event
Gold	1996 Hamar	Jeroen Straathof	Men's 1500 m
Gold	1996 Hamar	Ids Postma	Men's 5000 m
Gold	1996 Hamar	Gianni Romme	Men's 10000 m
Gold	1996 Hamar	Annamarie Thomas	Women's 1000 m
Gold	1996 Hamar	Annamarie Thomas	Women's 1500 m
Silver	1996 Hamar	Carla Zijlstra	Women's 5000 m
Bronze	1996 Hamar	Martin Hersman	Men's 1500 m
Bronze	1996 Hamar	Gianni Romme	Men's 5000 m
Bronze	1996 Hamar	Sandra Zwolle	Women's 1500 m
Gold	1997 Warsaw	Rintje Ritsma	Men's 1500 m
Gold	1997 Warsaw	Rintje Ritsma	Men's 5000 m
Gold	1997 Warsaw	Gianni Romme	Men's 10000 m
Gold	1997 Warsaw	Marianne Timmer	Women's 1000 m
Silver	1997 Warsaw	Jan Bos	Men's 1000 m
Silver	1997 Warsaw	Gianni Romme	Men's 5000 m
Silver	1997 Warsaw	Rintje Ritsma	Men's 10000 m
Silver	1997 Warsaw	Sandra Zwolle	Women's 1000 m
Silver	1997 Warsaw	Carla Zijlstra	Women's 5000 m
Bronze	1997 Warsaw	Martin Hersman	Men's 1000 m
Bronze	1997 Warsaw	Bob de Jong	Men's 10000 m
Bronze	1997 Warsaw	Marianne Timmer	Women's 1500 m
Bronze	1997 Warsaw	Carla Zijlstra	Women's 5000 m
Gold	1998 Calgary	Gianni Romme	Men's 5000 m
Gold	1998 Calgary	Gianni Romme	Men's 10000 m
Silver	1998 Calgary	Ids Postma	Men's 1000 m
Silver	1998 Calgary	Rintje Ritsma	Men's 5000 m
Silver	1998 Calgary	Bob de Jong	Men's 10000 m
Bronze	1998 Calgary	Carla Zijlstra	Women's 5000 m
Gold	1999 Heerenveen	Jan Bos	Men's 1000m
Gold	1999 Heerenveen	Ids Postma	Men's 1500m
Gold	1999 Heerenveen	Gianni Romme	Men's 5000m
Gold	1999 Heerenveen	Bob de Jong	Men's 10000m
Gold	1999 Heerenveen	Marianne Timmer	Women's 1000m
Silver	1999 Heerenveen	Erben Wennemars	Men's 500m
Silver	1999 Heerenveen	Gianni Romme	Men's 10000m
Silver	1999 Heerenveen	Tonny de Jong	Women's 3000m
Bronze	1999 Heerenveen	Marianne Timmer	Women's 500m
Bronze	1999 Heerenveen	Jakko Jan Leeuwangh	Men's 500m
Bronze	1999 Heerenveen	Jakko Jan Leeuwangh	Men's 1000m
Bronze	1999 Heerenveen	Rintje Ritsma	Men's 1500m
Bronze	1999 Heerenveen	Bob de Jong	Men's 5000m
Bronze	1999 Heerenveen	Tonny de Jong	Women's 1500m
Bronze	1999 Heerenveen	Tonny de Jong	Women's 5000m
Gold	2000 Nagano	Ids Postma	Men's 1500m
Gold	2000 Nagano	Gianni Romme	Men's 5000m
Gold	2000 Nagano	Gianni Romme	Men's 10000m
Silver	2000 Nagano	Jan Bos	Men's 1000m
Silver	2000 Nagano	Bob de Jong	Men's 5000m
Silver	2000 Nagano	Bob de Jong	Men's 10000m
Silver	2000 Nagano	Marianne Timmer	Women's 1000m
Bronze	2000 Nagano	Jan Bos	Men's 1500m
Bronze	2000 Nagano	Tonny de Jong	Women's 5000m
Gold	2001 Salt Lake City	Bob de Jong	Men's 5000m
Gold	2001 Salt Lake City	Carl Verheijen	Men's 10000m
Silver	2001 Salt Lake City	Carl Verheijen	Men's 5000m
Silver	2001 Salt Lake City	Bob de Jong	Men's 10000m
Bronze	2001 Salt Lake City	Erben Wennemars	Men's 1500m
Bronze	2001 Salt Lake City	Gianni Romme	Men's 5000m
Gold	2003 Berlin	Erben Wennemars	Men's 1000m
Gold	2003 Berlin	Erben Wennemars	Men's 1500m
Gold	2003 Berlin	Jochem Uytdehaage	Men's 5000m
Gold	2003 Berlin	Bob de Jong	Men's 10000m
Silver	2003 Berlin	Gerard van Velde	Men's 1000m
Silver	2003 Berlin	Ralf van der Rijst	Men's 1500m
Silver	2003 Berlin	Bob de Jong	Men's 5000m
Silver	2003 Berlin	Carl Verheijen	Men's 10000m
Bronze	2003 Berlin	Erben Wennemars	Men's 500m
Bronze	2003 Berlin	Carl Verheijen	Men's 5000m
Bronze	2003 Berlin	Gretha Smit	Women's 3000m
Bronze	2003 Berlin	Gretha Smit	Women's 5000m
Gold	2004 Seoul	Erben Wennemars	Men's 1000m
Gold	2004 Seoul	Carl Verheijen	Men's 10000m
Silver	2004 Seoul	Mark Tuitert	Men's 1500m
Silver	2004 Seoul	Carl Verheijen	Men's 5000m
Silver	2004 Seoul	Bob de Jong	Men's 10000m
Silver	2004 Seoul	Marianne Timmer	Women's 1000m
Silver	2004 Seoul	Gretha Smit	Women's 3000m
Silver	2004 Seoul	Gretha Smit	Women's 5000m
Bronze	2004 Seoul	Erben Wennemars	Men's 1500m
Bronze	2004 Seoul	Gianni Romme	Men's 5000m
Gold	2005 Inzell	Gianni Romme	Men's 10000m
Gold	2005 Inzell	Mark Tuitert; Carl Verheijen; Erben Wennemars	Men's Team pursuit
Gold	2005 Inzell	Barbara de Loor	Women's 1000m
Silver	2005 Inzell	Jan Bos	Men's 1000m
Silver	2005 Inzell	Mark Tuitert	Men's 1500m
Silver	2005 Inzell	Bob de Jong	Men's 5000m
Silver	2005 Inzell	Carl Verheijen	Men's 10000m
Bronze	2005 Inzell	Carl Verheijen	Men's 5000m
Bronze	2005 Inzell	Marianne Timmer	Women's 1000m
Gold	2007 Salt Lake City	Sven Kramer	Men's 5000m
Gold	2007 Salt Lake City	Sven Kramer	Men's 10000m
Gold	2007 Salt Lake City	Sven Kramer; Carl Verheijen; Erben Wennemars	Men's Team pursuit
Gold	2007 Salt Lake City	Ireen Wüst	Women's 1000m
Gold	2007 Salt Lake City	Ireen Wüst	Women's 1500m
Silver	2007 Salt Lake City	Erben Wennemars	Men's 1500m
Silver	2007 Salt Lake City	Carl Verheijen	Men's 10000m
Silver	2007 Salt Lake City	Renate Groenewold	Women's 3000m
Silver	2007 Salt Lake City	Paulien van Deutekom; Renate Groenewold; Ireen Wüst	Women's Team pursuit
Bronze	2007 Salt Lake City	Carl Verheijen	Men's 5000m
Bronze	2007 Salt Lake City	Brigt Rykkje	Men's 10000m
Gold	2008 Nagano	Sven Kramer	Men's 5000m
Gold	2008 Nagano	Sven Kramer	Men's 10000m
Gold	2008 Nagano	Sven Kramer; Wouter olde Heuvel; Erben Wennemars	Men's Team pursuit
Gold	2008 Nagano	Paulien van Deutekom; Renate Groenewold; Ireen Wüst	Women's Team pursuit
Silver	2008 Nagano	Sven Kramer	Men's 1500m
Silver	2008 Nagano	Paulien van Deutekom	Women's 1500m
Silver	2008 Nagano	Paulien van Deutekom	Women's 3000m
Bronze	2008 Nagano	Wouter olde Heuvel	Men's 5000m
Bronze	2008 Nagano	Bob de Jong	Men's 10000m
Bronze	2008 Nagano	Annette Gerritsen	Women's 500m
Bronze	2008 Nagano	Annette Gerritsen	Women's 1000m
Gold	2009 Vancouver	Sven Kramer	Men's 5000m
Gold	2009 Vancouver	Sven Kramer	Men's 10000m
Gold	2009 Vancouver	Sven Kramer; Wouter olde Heuvel; Carl Verheijen	Men's Team pursuit
Gold	2009 Vancouver	Renate Groenewold	Women's 3000m
Silver	2009 Vancouver	Ireen Wüst	Women's 1500m
Silver	2009 Vancouver	Renate Groenewold; Jorien Voorhuis; Ireen Wüst	Women's Team pursuit
Bronze	2009 Vancouver	Bob de Jong	Men's 10000m
Bronze	2009 Vancouver	Margot Boer	Women's 1000m
Gold	2011 Inzell	Bob de Jong	Men's 5000m
Gold	2011 Inzell	Bob de Jong	Men's 10000m
Gold	2011 Inzell	Ireen Wüst	Women's 1500m
Gold	2011 Inzell	Ireen Wüst	Women's 3000m
Silver	2011 Inzell	Kjeld Nuis	Men's 1000m
Silver	2011 Inzell	Bob de Vries	Men's 10000m
Silver	2011 Inzell	Ireen Wüst	Women's 1000m
Silver	2011 Inzell	Diane Valkenburg	Women's 1500m
Silver	2011 Inzell	Marrit Leenstra; Diane Valkenburg; Ireen Wüst	Women's Team pursuit
Bronze	2011 Inzell	Jan Smeekens	Men's 500m
Bronze	2011 Inzell	Stefan Groothuis	Men's 1000m
Bronze	2011 Inzell	Jan Blokhuijsen; Koen Verweij; Bob de Vries	Men's Team pursuit
Bronze	2011 Inzell	Jorien Voorhuis	Women's 1500m
Gold	2012 Heerenveen	Stefan Groothuis	Men's 1000m
Gold	2012 Heerenveen	Sven Kramer	Men's 5000m
Gold	2012 Heerenveen	Bob de Jong	Men's 10000m
Gold	2012 Heerenveen	Jan Blokhuijsen; Sven Kramer; Koen Verweij	Men's Team pursuit
Gold	2012 Heerenveen	Diane Valkenburg; Linda de Vries; Ireen Wüst	Women's Team pursuit
Silver	2012 Heerenveen	Michel Mulder	Men's 500m
Silver	2012 Heerenveen	Kjeld Nuis	Men's 1000m
Silver	2012 Heerenveen	Bob de Jong	Men's 5000m
Silver	2012 Heerenveen	Jorrit Bergsma	Men's 10000m
Silver	2012 Heerenveen	Ireen Wüst	Women's 1500m
Bronze	2012 Heerenveen	Thijsje Oenema	Women's 500m
Bronze	2012 Heerenveen	Margot Boer	Women's 1000m
Bronze	2012 Heerenveen	Linda de Vries	Women's 1500m
Bronze	2012 Heerenveen	Ireen Wüst	Women's 3000m
Gold	2013 Sochi	Sven Kramer	Men's 5000m
Gold	2013 Sochi	Jorrit Bergsma	Men's 10000m
Gold	2013 Sochi	Jan Blokhuijsen; Sven Kramer; Koen Verweij	Men's Team pursuit
Gold	2013 Sochi	Ireen Wüst	Women's 1500m
Gold	2013 Sochi	Ireen Wüst	Women's 3000m
Gold	2013 Sochi	Diane Valkenburg; Marrit Leenstra; Ireen Wüst	Women's Team pursuit
Silver	2013 Sochi	Jorrit Bergsma	Men's 5000m
Silver	2013 Sochi	Sven Kramer	Men's 10000m
Silver	2013 Sochi	Ireen Wüst	Women's 1000m
Silver	2013 Sochi	Lotte van Beek	Women's 1500m
Silver	2013 Sochi	Ireen Wüst	Women's 5000m
Bronze	2013 Sochi	Jan Smeekens	Men's 500m
Bronze	2013 Sochi	Bob de Jong	Men's 10000m
Gold	2015 Heerenveen	Sven Kramer	Men's 5000m
Gold	2015 Heerenveen	Jorrit Bergsma	Men's 10000m
Gold	2015 Heerenveen	Sven Kramer; Koen Verweij; Douwe de Vries	Men's Team pursuit
Gold	2015 Heerenveen	Arjan Stroetinga	Men's Mass start
Gold	2015 Heerenveen	Irene Schouten	Women's Mass start
Silver	2015 Heerenveen	Michel Mulder	Men's 500m
Silver	2015 Heerenveen	Jorrit Bergsma	Men's 5000m
Silver	2015 Heerenveen	Erik Jan Kooiman	Men's 10,000m
Silver	2015 Heerenveen	Ireen Wüst	Women's 1500m
Silver	2015 Heerenveen	Ireen Wüst	Women's 3000m
Silver	2015 Heerenveen	Carlijn Achtereekte	Women's 5000m
Silver	2015 Heerenveen	Marije Joling; Marrit Leenstra; Ireen Wüst	Women's Team pursuit
Bronze	2015 Heerenveen	Kjeld Nuis	Men's 1000m
Bronze	2015 Heerenveen	Koen Verweij	Men's 1500m
Bronze	2015 Heerenveen	Douwe de Vries	Men's 5000m
Bronze	2015 Heerenveen	Marije Joling	Women's 3000m
Bronze	2015 Heerenveen	Mariska Huisman	Women's Mass start

== Medal table ==
=== Medals by discipline ===
Event	Gold	Silver	Bronze	Total	Rank
Men's 500m	1	3	4	8	5
Men's 1000m	5	6	6	17	1
Men's 1500m	6	7	8	21	1
Men's 5000m	16	12	9	37	1
Men's 10.000m	18	14	6	38	1
Men's Mass start	1	1	0	2	1
Men's Team pursuit	9	0	1	10	1
Women's 500m	0	0	3	3	9
Women's 1000m	6	5	5	16	1
Women's 1500m	5	7	7	12	2
Women's 3000m	4	6	6	16	2
Women's 5000m	0	5	6	11	4
Women's Mass start	1	0	1	2	3
Women's Team Pursuit	5	4	0	9	1

=== Medals by championships ===
Event	Gold	Silver	Bronze	Total	Rank
1996 Hamar	5	1	3	9	1
1997 Warsaw	4	5	4	13	1
1998 Calgary	2	3	1	6	3
1999 Heerenveen	5	3	7	15	1
2000 Nagano	3	4	2	9	2
2001 Salt Lake City	2	2	2	6	2
2003 Berlin	4	4	4	12	2
2004 Seoul	2	6	2	10	2
2005 Inzell	3	4	2	9	1
2007 Salt Lake City	5	4	2	11	1
2008 Nagano	4	3	4	11	1
2009 Vancouver	4	2	2	8	1
2011 Inzell	4	5	4	13	1
2012 Heerenveen	5	5	4	14	1
2013 Sochi	6	5	2	13	1
2015 Heerenveen	5	7	5	17	1
2016 Kolomna	6	5	5	16	1
2017 Gangneung	8	3	4	15	1
2019 Inzell	8	6	2	16	1
2020 Salt Lake City	7	5	2	14	1
2021 Heerenveen	7	6	5	18	1

=== Medals by skater ===
Including team pursuit, after 2023 World Single Distances Speed Skating Championships

Men

Rank	Skater	Gold	Silver	Bronze	Total
1	Sven Kramer	21	3	2	26
2	Bob de Jong	7	8	5	20
3	Gianni Romme	7	2	3	12
4	Erben Wennemars	6	2	3	11
5	Jorrit Bergsma	5	8	–	13
6	Carl Verheijen	5	5	3	13
7	Douwe de Vries	5	–	1	6
8	Kjeld Nuis	4	6	3	13
9	Jan Blokhuijsen	4	–	1	5
9	Kai Verbij	4	–	1	5

Women

Rank	Skater	Gold	Silver	Bronze	Total
1	Ireen Wüst	15	15	1	31
2	Antoinette de Jong	5	4	2	11
3	Irene Schouten	5	1	5	11
4	Jutta Leerdam	4	1	1	6
5	Marrit Leenstra	3	2	0	5
6	Renate Groenewold	2	3	0	5
7	Marianne Timmer	2	2	3	7
8	Diane Valkenburg	2	2	-	4
9	Femke Kok	2	1	-	3
10	Jorien ter Mors	2	-	1	3
