= 1999 World Single Distance Speed Skating Championships =

International speed skating competition

World Single Distance Speed Skating Championships
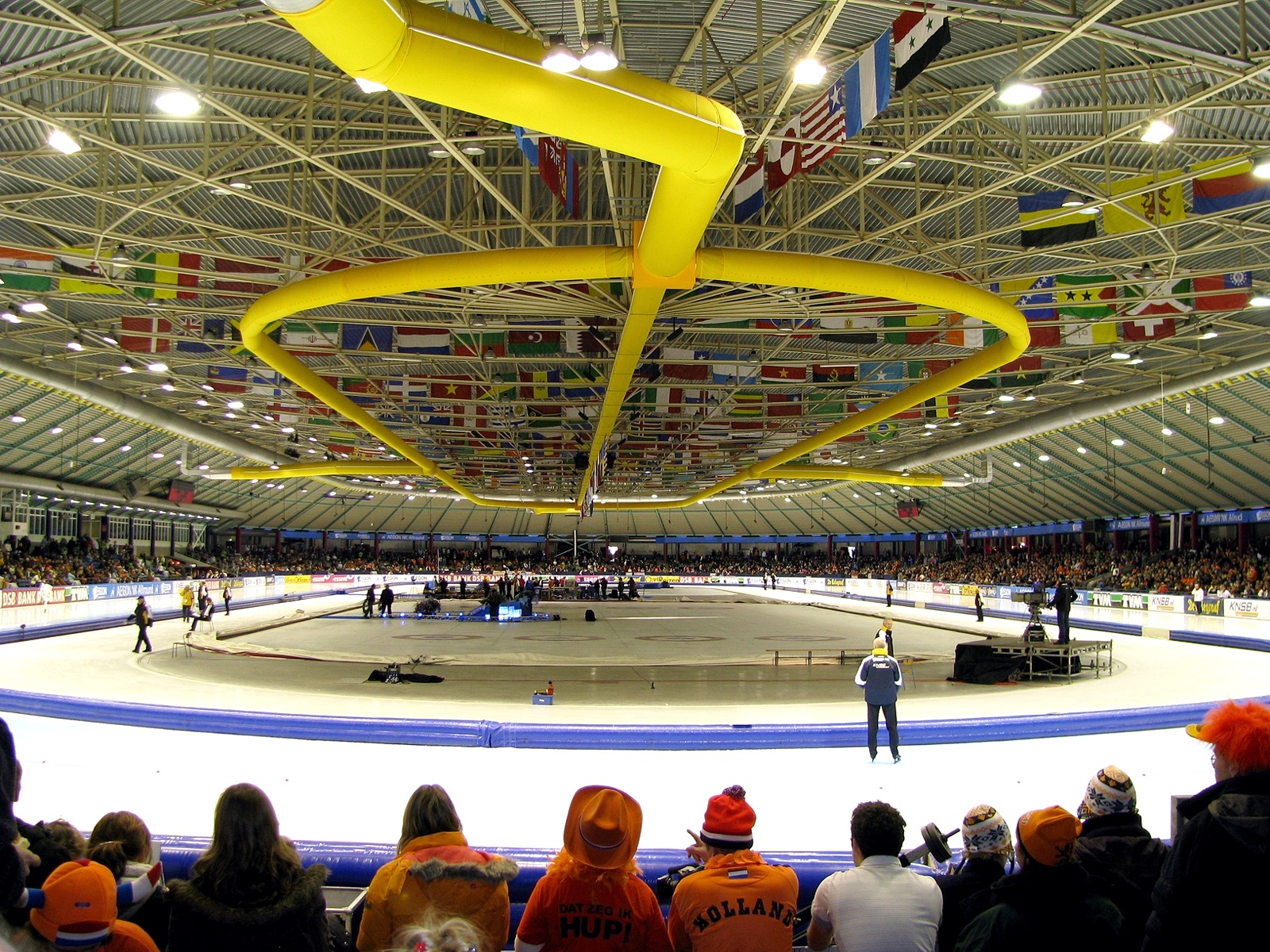
- Thialf (Heerenveen)
- Venue: Thialf (Heerenveen)
- Dates: 12–14 March 1999

The 1999 World Single Distance Speed Skating Championships were held between 12 and 14 March 1999 in the Thialf, Heerenveen, Netherlands.

== Schedule ==
Date	Events
March 12	5000 m men
March 12	500 m women (1st)
March 12	500 m women (2nd)
March 12	3000 m women
March 13	500 m men (1st)
March 13	500 m men (2nd)
March 13	1500 m men
March 13	1000 m women
March 13	5000 m women
March 14	1000 m men
March 14	10000 m men
March 14	1500 m women

== Medal summary ==
=== Men's events ===
Event	Gold		Silver		Bronze	
500 m	Hiroyasu Shimizu; Japan	1:10.69; 35.43; 35.26	Erben Wennemars; Netherlands	1:11.38; 35.61; 35.77	Jakko Jan Leeuwangh; Netherlands	1:11.83; 35.81; 36.02
1000 m	Jan Bos; Netherlands	1:10.41	Hiroyasu Shimizu; Japan	1:10.75	Jakko Jan Leeuwangh; Netherlands	1:10.79
1500 m	Ids Postma; Netherlands	1:47.92	Ådne Søndrål; Norway	1:48.25	Rintje Ritsma; Netherlands	1:49.28
5000 m	Gianni Romme; Netherlands	6:29.39	Bart Veldkamp; Belgium	6:29.75	Bob de Jong; Netherlands	6:29.88
10000 m	Bob de Jong; Netherlands	13:26.61	Gianni Romme; Netherlands	13:29.83	Frank Dittrich; Germany	13:30.22

=== Women's events ===
Event	Gold		Silver		Bronze	
500 m	Catriona Le May Doan; Canada	1:16.87; 38.48; 38.39	Svetlana Zhurova; Russia	1:16.93; 38.04; 38.89	Tomomi Okazaki; Japan; Marianne Timmer; Netherlands	1:17.26; 38.62; 38.64; 1:17.26; 38.69; 38.57
1000 m	Marianne Timmer; Netherlands	1:16.21	Monique Garbrecht; Germany	1:16.75	Catriona Le May Doan; Canada	1:16.97
1500 m	Emese Hunyady; Austria	1:58.29	Gunda Niemann-Stirnemann; Germany	1:58.43	Tonny de Jong; Netherlands	1:59.17
3000 m	Gunda Niemann-Stirnemann; Germany	4:04.88	Claudia Pechstein; Germany; Tonny de Jong; Netherlands	4:07.49	Not awarded	
5000 m	Gunda Niemann-Stirnemann; Germany	7:01.88	Claudia Pechstein; Germany	7:04.24	Tonny de Jong; Netherlands	7:05.16

=== Medal table ===
Rank	Nation	Gold	Silver	Bronze	Total
1	Netherlands (NED)	5	3	7	15
2	Germany (GER)	2	4	1	7
3	Japan (JPN)	1	1	1	3
4	Canada (CAN)	1	0	1	2
5	Austria (AUT)	1	0	0	1
6	Belgium (BEL)	0	1	0	1
6	Norway (NOR)	0	1	0	1
6	Russia (RUS)	0	1	0	1
Totals (8 entries)		10	11	10	31
