= 1996 World Single Distance Speed Skating Championships =

International speed skating competition

World Single Distance Speed Skating Championships
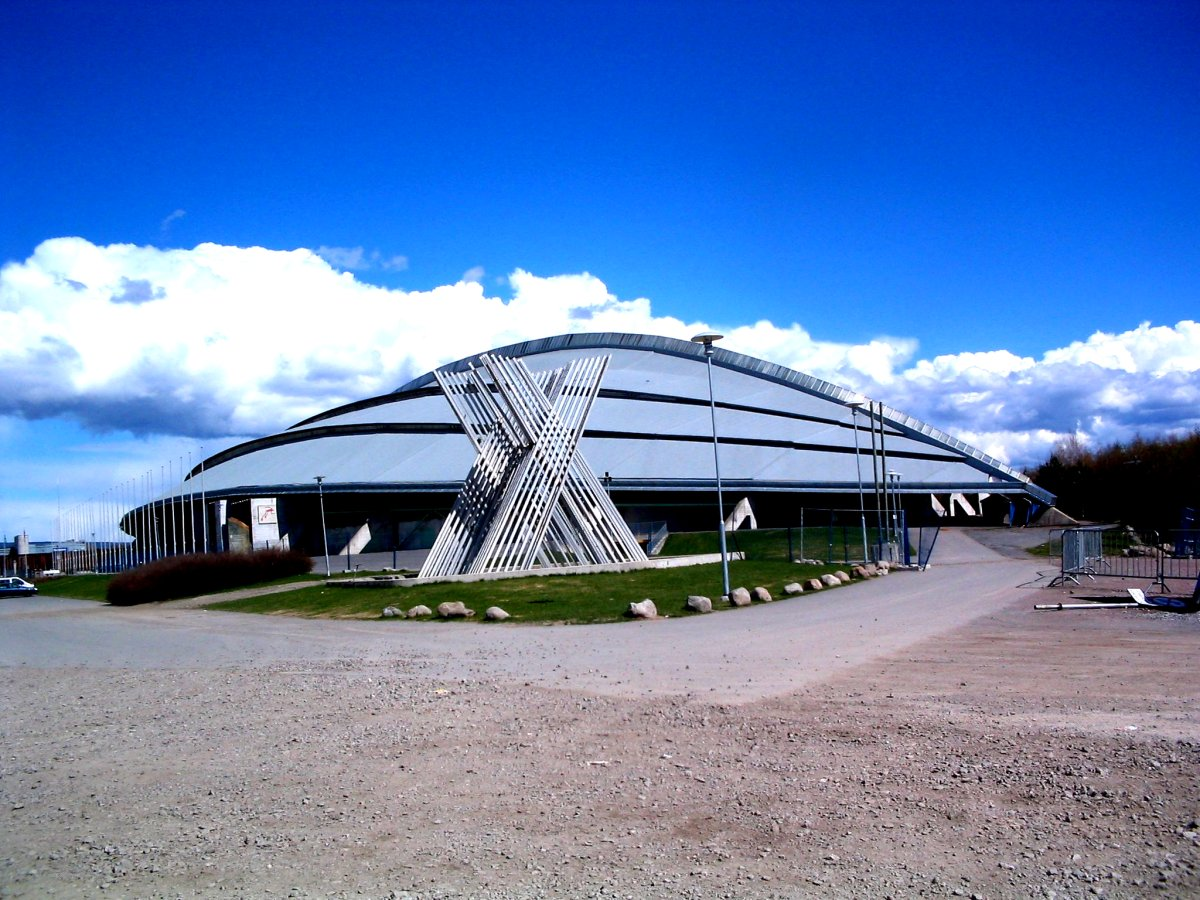
- Vikingskipet (Hamar)
- Venue: Vikingskipet (Hamar)
- Dates: 15–17 March 1996

The 1996 World Single Distance Speed Skating Championships were held between 15 and 17 March 1996 in the Vikingskipet, Hamar, Norway. This was the first World Single Distance championships.

== Schedule ==
Date	Events
March 15	5000 m men
March 15	500 m women (1st)
March 15	500 m women (2nd)
March 15	3000 m women
March 16	500 m men (1st)
March 16	500 m men (2nd)
March 16	1500 m men
March 16	1000 m women
March 16	5000 m women
March 17	1000 m men
March 17	10000 m men
March 17	1500 m women

== Medal summary ==
=== Men's events ===
Event	Gold		Silver		Bronze	
500 m	Hiroyasu Shimizu; Japan	1:12.06; 35.91; 36.15	Sergey Klevchenya; Russia	1:12.21; 36.13; 36.08	Roger Strøm; Norway	1:12.85; 36.62; 36.23
1000 m	Sergey Klevchenya; Russia	1:13.30	Ådne Søndrål; Norway	1:13.78	Jaegal Sung-yeol; South Korea	1:14.16
1500 m	Jeroen Straathof; Netherlands	1:53.94	Ådne Søndrål; Norway	1:54.14	Martin Hersman; Netherlands	1:54.38
5000 m	Ids Postma; Netherlands	6:47.09	Keiji Shirahata; Japan	6:47.20	Gianni Romme; Netherlands	6:48.21
10000 m	Gianni Romme; Netherlands	14:05.46	Bart Veldkamp; Belgium	14:15.20	Frank Dittrich; Germany	14:15.33

=== Women's events ===
Event	Gold		Silver		Bronze	
500 m	Svetlana Zhurova; Russia	1:19.30; 39.73; 39.57	Kyoko Shimazaki; Japan	1:19.47; 39.90; 39.57	Tomomi Okazaki; Japan	1:19.56; 39.81; 39.75
1000 m	Annamarie Thomas; Netherlands	1:21.01	Chris Witty; United States	1:21.25	Emese Hunyady; Austria	1:21.53
1500 m	Annamarie Thomas; Netherlands	2:04.46	Claudia Pechstein; Germany	2:05.22	Sandra Zwolle; Netherlands	2:05.26
3000 m	Gunda Niemann-Stirnemann; Germany	4:13.83	Claudia Pechstein; Germany	4:18.17	Lyudmila Prokasheva; Kazakhstan	4:20.90
5000 m	Claudia Pechstein; Germany	7:26.36	Carla Zijlstra; Netherlands	7:28.79	Elena Belci-Dal Farra; Italy	7:30.66

=== Medal table ===
* Host nation (Norway)

Rank	Nation	Gold	Silver	Bronze	Total
1	Netherlands (NED)	5	1	3	9
2	Germany (GER)	2	2	1	5
3	Russia (RUS)	2	1	0	3
4	Japan (JPN)	1	2	1	4
5	Norway (NOR)*	0	2	1	3
6	Belgium (BEL)	0	1	0	1
6	United States (USA)	0	1	0	1
8	Austria (AUT)	0	0	1	1
8	Italy (ITA)	0	0	1	1
8	Kazakhstan (KAZ)	0	0	1	1
8	South Korea (KOR)	0	0	1	1
Totals (11 entries)		10	10	10	30
