= 1998 World Single Distance Speed Skating Championships =

International speed skating competition

World Single Distance Speed Skating Championships
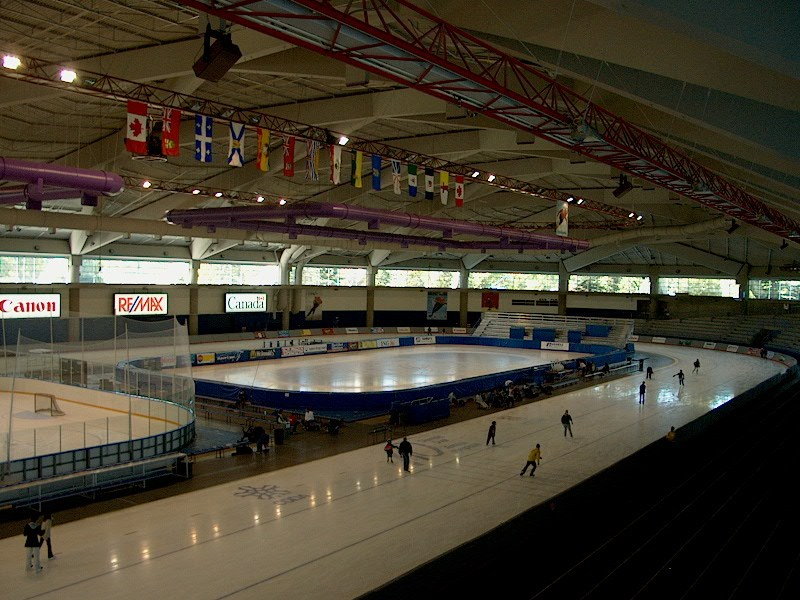
- Olympic Oval (Calgary)
- Venue: Olympic Oval (Calgary)
- Dates: 27–29 March 1998

The 1998 World Single Distance Speed Skating Championships were held between 27 and 29 March 1998 in the Olympic Oval, Calgary, Canada.

== Schedule ==
Date	Events
March 27	5000 m men
March 27	500 m women (1st)
March 27	500 m women (2nd)
March 27	3000 m women
March 28	500 m men (1st)
March 28	500 m men (2nd)
March 28	1500 m men
March 28	1000 m women
March 28	5000 m women
March 29	1000 m men
March 29	10000 m men
March 29	1500 m women

== Medal summary ==
=== Men's events ===
Event	Gold		Silver		Bronze	
500 m	Hiroyasu Shimizu; Japan	1:10.18; 35.36; 34.82	Sylvain Bouchard; Canada	1:10.68; 35.47; 35.21	Jeremy Wotherspoon; Canada	1:10.88; 35.60; 35.28
1000 m	Sylvain Bouchard; Canada	1:09.60	Jeremy Wotherspoon; Canada	1:09.67	Hiroyasu Shimizu; Japan	1:09.83
1500 m	Ådne Søndrål; Norway	1:46.43	Ids Postma; Netherlands	1:47.08	Roberto Sighel; Italy	1:47.47
5000 m	Gianni Romme; Netherlands	6:21.49	Rintje Ritsma; Netherlands	6:25.55	Bart Veldkamp; Belgium	6:27.58
10000 m	Gianni Romme; Netherlands	13:08.71	Bob de Jong; Netherlands	13:22.64	Frank Dittrich; Germany	13:30.33

=== Women's events ===
Event	Gold		Silver		Bronze	
500 m	Catriona Le May Doan; Canada	1:15.59; 37.88; 37.71	Svetlana Zhurova; Russia	1:16.65; 38.30; 38.35	Tomomi Okazaki; Japan	1:16.68; 38.27; 38.41
1000 m	Chris Witty; United States	1:14.96	Catriona Le May Doan; Canada	1:15.28	Franziska Schenk; Germany	1:15.46
1500 m	Anni Friesinger; Germany	1:56.95	Gunda Niemann-Stirnemann; Germany	1:57.20	Claudia Pechstein; Germany	1:57.30
3000 m	Gunda Niemann-Stirnemann; Germany	4:01.67	Claudia Pechstein; Germany	4:04.78	Anni Friesinger; Germany	4:05.86
5000 m	Gunda Niemann-Stirnemann; Germany	6:58.63	Claudia Pechstein; Germany	7:02.95	Carla Zijlstra; Netherlands	7:08.94

=== Medal table ===
Rank	Nation	Gold	Silver	Bronze	Total
1	Germany (GER)	3	3	4	10
2	Canada (CAN)	2	3	1	6
2	Netherlands (NED)	2	3	1	6
4	Japan (JPN)	1	0	2	3
5	Norway (NOR)	1	0	0	1
5	United States (USA)	1	0	0	1
7	Russia (RUS)	0	1	0	1
8	Belgium (BEL)	0	0	1	1
8	Italy (ITA)	0	0	1	1
Totals (9 entries)		10	10	10	30
