= 2001 World Single Distance Speed Skating Championships =

International speed skating competition

World Single Distance Speed Skating Championships
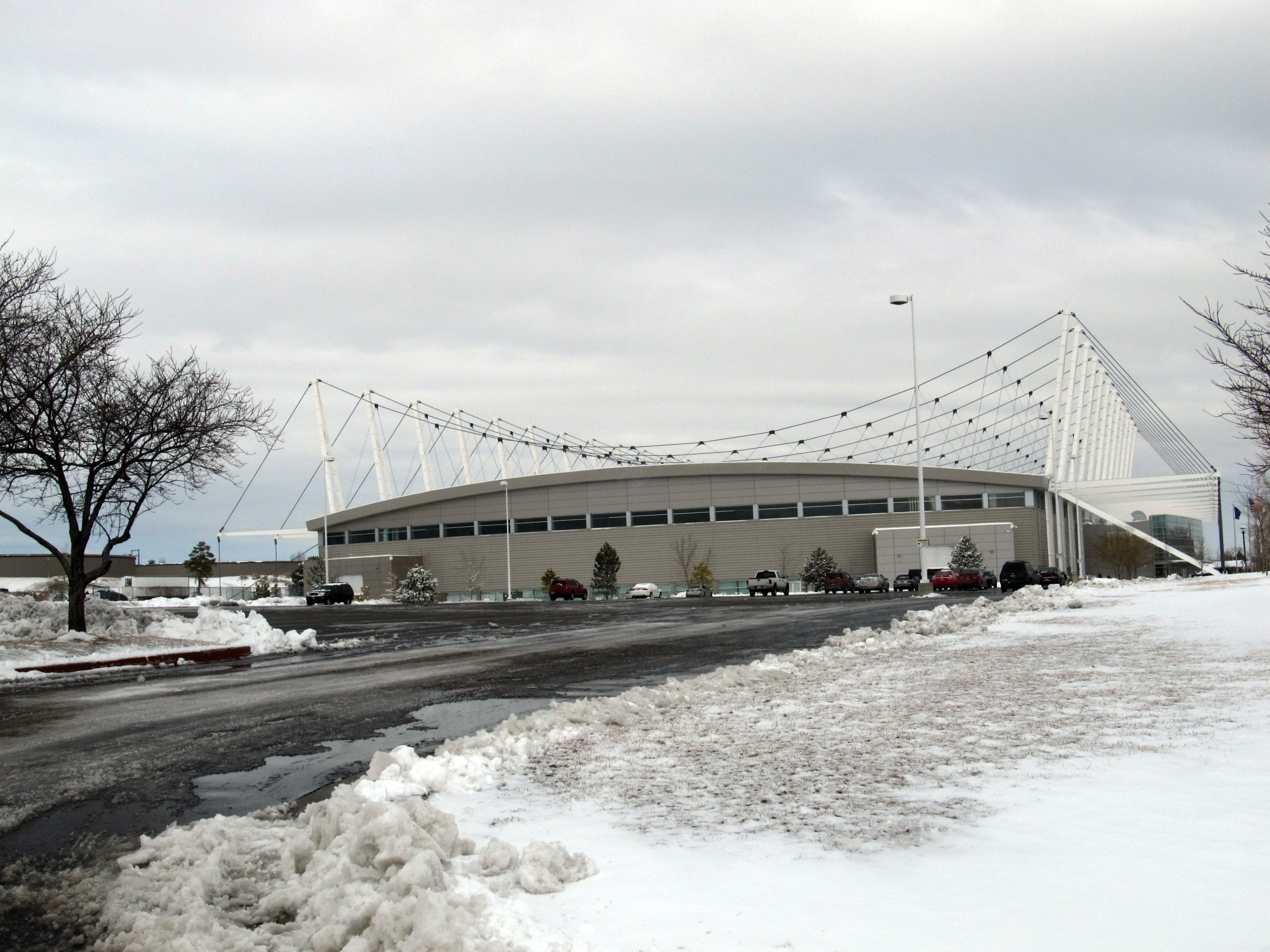
- Utah Olympic Oval (Kearns)
- Venue: Utah Olympic Oval (Kearns)
- Dates: 9–11 March 2001

The 2001 World Single Distance Speed Skating Championships were held between 9 and 11 March 2001 in the Utah Olympic Oval.

== Schedule ==
| Date | Events |
|---|---|
| March 9 | 1500 m men |
| March 9 | 500 m women (1st) |
| March 9 | 500 m women (2nd) |
| March 9 | 3000 m women |
| March 10 | 500 m men (1st) |
| March 10 | 500 m men (2nd) |
| March 10 | 5000 m men |
| March 10 | 1000 m women |
| March 10 | 5000 m women |
| March 11 | 1000 m men |
| March 11 | 10000 m men |
| March 11 | 1500 m women |

== Medal summary ==
=== Men's events ===
| Event | Gold | | Silver | | Bronze | |
|---|---|---|---|---|---|---|
| 500 m | Hiroyasu Shimizu; Japan | 1:08.96; 34.64; 34.32 | Jeremy Wotherspoon; Canada | 1:09.29; 34.77; 34.52 | Casey FitzRandolph; United States | 1:09.76; 35.04; 34.72 |
| 1000 m | Jeremy Wotherspoon; Canada | 1:08.28 WR | Ådne Søndrål; Norway | 1:08.50 | Sergey Klevchenya; Russia | 1:08.59 |
| 1500 m | Ådne Søndrål; Norway | 1:46.10 | Derek Parra; United States | 1:46.20 | Erben Wennemars; Netherlands | 1:46.22 |
| 5000 m | Bob de Jong; Netherlands | 6:19.58 | Carl Verheijen; Netherlands | 6:22.43 | Gianni Romme; Netherlands | 6:25.00 |
| 10000 m | Carl Verheijen; Netherlands | 13:12.49 | Bob de Jong; Netherlands | 13:13.81 | Vadim Sayutin; Russia | 13:17.83 |

=== Women's events ===
| Event | Gold | | Silver | | Bronze | |
|---|---|---|---|---|---|---|
| 500 m | Catriona Le May Doan; Canada | 1:14.72; 37.43; 37.29 | Monique Garbrecht-Enfeldt; Germany | 1:15.20; 37.71; 37.49 | Svetlana Zhurova; Russia | 1:15.24; 37.69; 37.55 |
| 1000 m | Monique Garbrecht-Enfeldt; Germany | 1:14.13 WR | Sabine Völker; Germany | 1:14.14 | Catriona Le May Doan; Canada | 1:14.50 |
| 1500 m | Anni Friesinger; Germany | 1:54.58 | Maki Tabata; Japan | 1:54.76 | Cindy Klassen; Canada | 1:55.08 |
| 3000 m | Gunda Niemann-Stirnemann; Germany | 4:00.34 | Anni Friesinger; Germany | 4:01.98 | Claudia Pechstein; Germany | 4:01.13 |
| 5000 m | Gunda Niemann-Stirnemann; Germany | 6:52.44 WR | Claudia Pechstein; Germany | 6:58.11 | Maki Tabata; Japan | 7:05.49 |

=== Medal table ===
| Rank | Nation | Gold | Silver | Bronze | Total |
|---|---|---|---|---|---|
| 1 | Germany (GER) | 4 | 4 | 1 | 9 |
| 2 | Netherlands (NED) | 2 | 2 | 2 | 6 |
| 3 | Canada (CAN) | 2 | 1 | 2 | 5 |
| 4 | Japan (JPN) | 1 | 1 | 1 | 3 |
| 5 | Norway (NOR) | 1 | 1 | 0 | 2 |
| 6 | United States (USA) | 0 | 1 | 1 | 2 |
| 7 | Russia (RUS) | 0 | 0 | 3 | 3 |
| Totals (7 entries) | | 10 | 10 | 10 | 30 |
