= 2000 World Single Distance Speed Skating Championships =

International speed skating competition

World Single Distance Speed Skating Championships
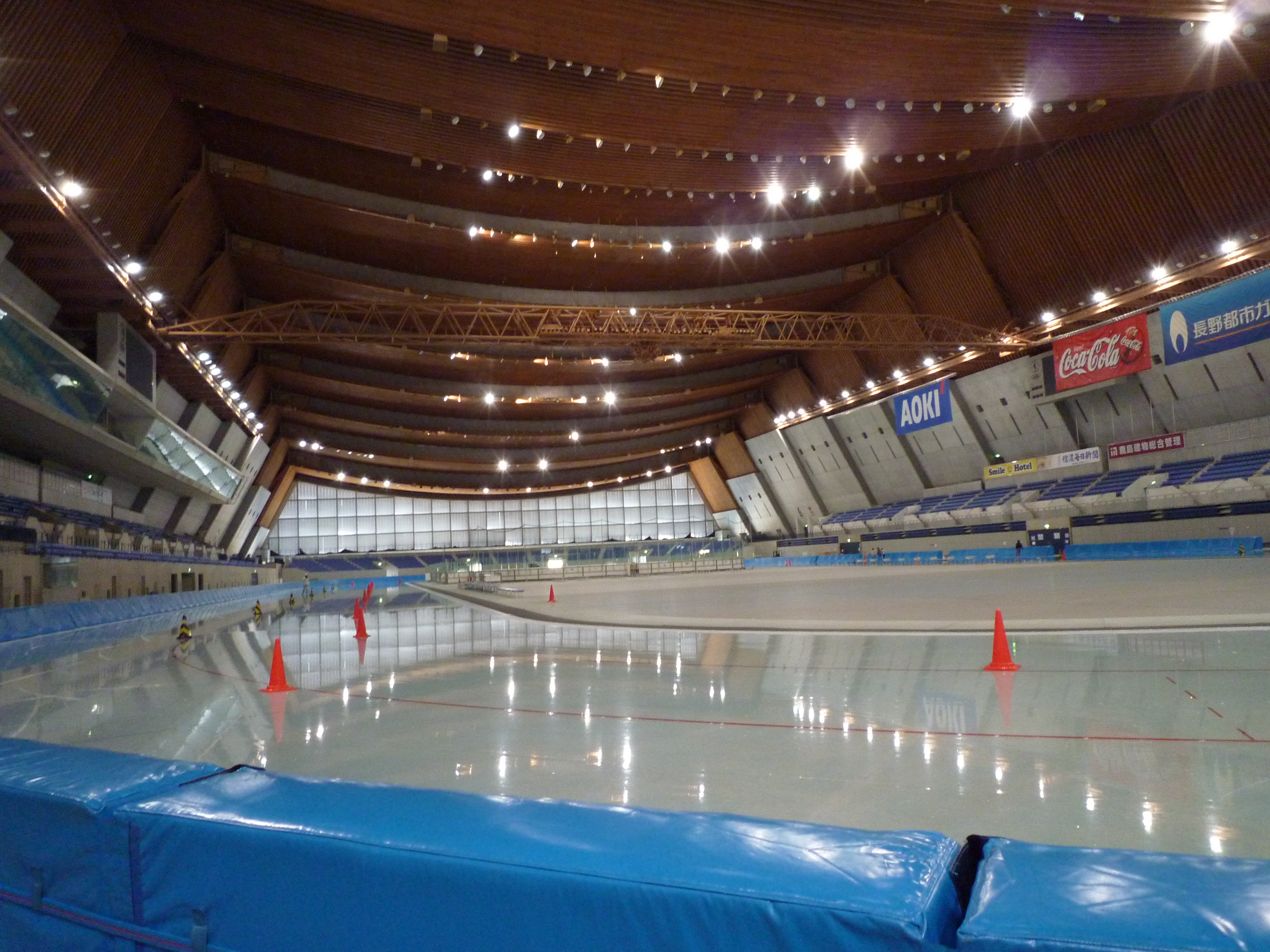
- M-Wave (Nagano)
- Venue: M-Wave (Nagano)
- Dates: 3–5 March 2000

The 2000 World Single Distance Speed Skating Championships were held between 3 and 5 March 2000 in the M-Wave, Nagano, Japan.

== Schedule ==
Date	Events
March 3	5000 m men
March 3	500 m women (1st)
March 3	500 m women (2nd)
March 3	3000 m women
March 4	500 m men (1st)
March 4	500 m men (2nd)
March 4	1500 m men
March 4	1000 m women
March 4	5000 m women
March 5	1000 m men
March 5	10000 m men
March 5	1500 m women

== Medal summary ==
=== Men's events ===
Event	Gold		Silver		Bronze	
500 m	Hiroyasu Shimizu; Japan	1:10.49; 35.30; 35.19	Mike Ireland; Canada	1:11.14; 35.80; 35.34	Jeremy Wotherspoon; Canada	1:11.38; 35.75; 35.62
1000 m	Ådne Søndrål; Norway	1:09.96	Jan Bos; Netherlands	1:09.98	Mike Ireland; Canada	1:10.58
1500 m	Ids Postma; Netherlands	1:47.98	Ådne Søndrål; Norway	1:48.61	Jan Bos; Netherlands	1:48.66
5000 m	Gianni Romme; Netherlands	6:23.31	Bob de Jong; Netherlands	6:25.40	Keiji Shirahata; Japan	6:31.16
10000 m	Gianni Romme; Netherlands	13:12.27	Bob de Jong; Netherlands	13:21.74	Frank Dittrich; Germany	13:27.93

=== Women's events ===
Event	Gold		Silver		Bronze	
500 m	Monique Garbrecht; Germany	1:17.48; 38.78; 38.70	Svetlana Zhurova; Russia	1:17.64; 38.79; 38.85	Catriona Le May Doan; Canada	1:17.78; 38.96; 38.82
1000 m	Monique Garbrecht; Germany	1:16.59	Marianne Timmer; Netherlands	1:16.71	Chris Witty; United States	1:17.28
1500 m	Claudia Pechstein; Germany	1:58.43	Anni Friesinger; Germany	1:58.62	Emese Hunyady; Austria	1:58.97
3000 m	Claudia Pechstein; Germany	4:05.68	Gunda Niemann-Stirnemann; Germany	4:05.75	Maki Tabata; Japan	4:09.18
5000 m	Gunda Niemann-Stirnemann; Germany	6:58.71	Claudia Pechstein; Germany	7:00.68	Tonny de Jong; Netherlands	7:06.30

=== Medal table ===
Rank	Nation	Gold	Silver	Bronze	Total
1	Germany (GER)	5	3	1	9
2	Netherlands (NED)	3	4	2	9
3	Norway (NOR)	1	1	0	2
4	Japan (JPN)	1	0	2	3
5	Canada (CAN)	0	1	3	4
6	Russia (RUS)	0	1	0	1
7	Austria (AUT)	0	0	1	1
7	United States (USA)	0	0	1	1
Totals (8 entries)		10	10	10	30
