= 2011 World Single Distance Speed Skating Championships – Men's 5000 metres =

The men's 5000 m race of the 2011 World Single Distance Speed Skating Championships was held on March 11 at 15:50 local time.

== Results ==
Rank	Pair	Lane	Name	Country	Time	Time behind	Notes
1st place, gold medalist(s)	12	i	Bob de Jong	Netherlands	6:15.41		
2nd place, silver medalist(s)	9	o	Lee Seung-hoon	South Korea	6:17.45	+2.04	
3rd place, bronze medalist(s)	12	o	Ivan Skobrev	Russia	6:17.47	+2.06	
4	10	i	Alexis Contin	France	6:18.85	+3.44	
5	11	i	Håvard Bøkko	Norway	6:21.16	+5.75	
6	11	o	Jonathan Kuck	United States	6:23.84	+8.43	
7	10	o	Wouter olde Heuvel	Netherlands	6:24.27	+8.86	
8	6	o	Shane Dobbin	New Zealand	6:25.85	+10.44	
9	8	o	Dmitry Babenko	Kazakhstan	6:29.35	+13.94	
10	4	i	Joshua Lose	Australia	6:30.09	+14.68	
11	8	i	Jan Szymański	Poland	6:30.15	+14.74	
12	7	i	Patrick Beckert	Germany	6:30.52	+15.11	
13	5	i	Brian Hansen	United States	6:30.96	+51.55	
14	7	o	Øystein Grødum	Norway	6:31.22	+15.81	
15	5	o	Henrik Christiansen	Norway	6:31.68	+16.27	
16	3	o	Robert Lehmann	Germany	6:31.92	+16.51	
17	1	i	Bart Swings	Belgium	6:32.49	+17.08	
18	2	i	Haralds Silovs	Latvia	6:32.95	+17.54	
19	2	o	Roger Schneider	Switzerland	6:36.83	+21.42	
20	3	i	Sławomir Chmura	Poland	6:37.28	+21.87	
21	6	i	Lucas Makowsky	Canada	6:37.57	+22.16	
22	4	o	Luca Stefani	Italy	6:39.52	+24.11	
23	1	o	Alexej Baumgärtner	Germany	6:41.91	+26.50	
–	9	i	Jan Blokhuijsen	Netherlands		DQ	
