= Hiroyasu Shimizu =

Japanese Olympic speed skater (born 1974)

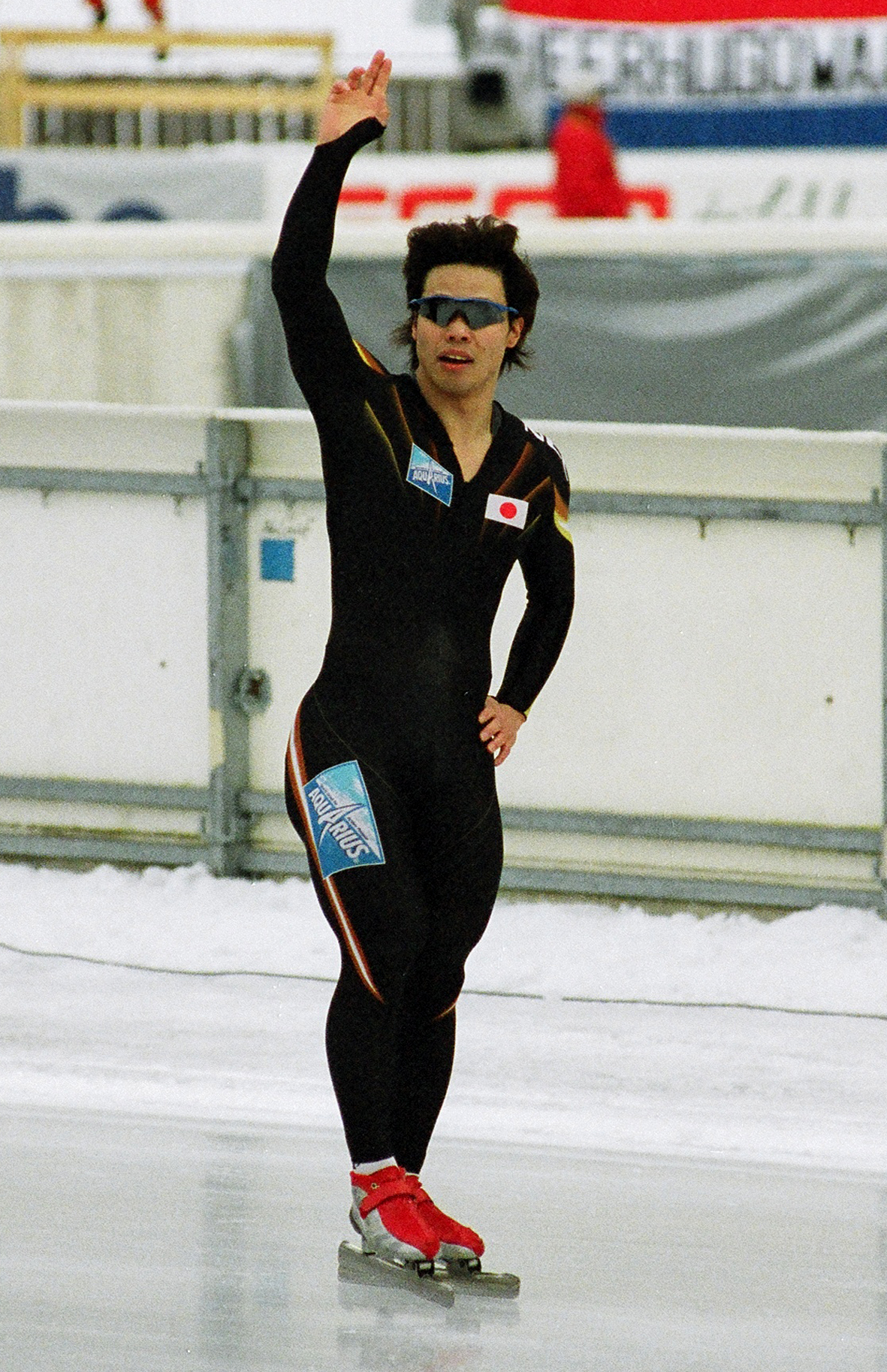

Personal information
- Born: 27 February 1974 (age 52) Obihiro, Hokkaidō, Japan
- Height: 1.62 m (5 ft 4 in)

Sport
- Country: Japan
- Sport: Speed skating
Medal record
Olympic Games
Gold medal – first place	1998 Nagano	500 m
Silver medal – second place	2002 Salt Lake City	500 m
Bronze medal – third place	1998 Nagano	1000 m
World Single Distance Championships
Gold medal – first place	1996 Hamar	500 m
Gold medal – first place	1998 Calgary	500 m
Gold medal – first place	1999 Heerenveen	500 m
Gold medal – first place	2000 Nagano	500 m
Gold medal – first place	2001 Salt Lake City	500 m
Silver medal – second place	1999 Heerenveen	1000 m
Silver medal – second place	2003 Berlin	500 m
Silver medal – second place	2005 Inzell	500 m
Bronze medal – third place	1997 Warszawa	500 m
Bronze medal – third place	1998 Calgary	1000 m
World Sprint Championships
Silver medal – second place	1995 Milwaukee	Sprint
Silver medal – second place	1996 Heerenveen	Sprint
Silver medal – second place	2001 Inzell	Sprint
Bronze medal – third place	1993 Ikaho	Sprint
Bronze medal – third place	1999 Calgary	Sprint
Bronze medal – third place	2000 Seoul	Sprint
Asian Games
Gold medal – first place	2003 Aomori	500 m
Silver medal – second place	2003 Aomori	1000 m

Hiroyasu Shimizu (清水 宏保, Shimizu Hiroyasu; born 27 February 1974) is a Japanese speed skater. A five-time world champion in the 500 meters, Shimizu became the first Japanese speed skater to win a gold medal with his performance at the 1998 Winter Olympics. At the 1998 World Championships, Shimizu set a world record (34.82) and became the first person to break the 35-second barrier in the event. Shimizu later broke this record at the 2001 World Championships with a time of 34.42.

He was married to Japanese fashion model Reiko Takagaki.

== World records ==
Event	Time	Date	Venue
500 m	35.39	2 March 1996	Olympic Oval, Calgary
500 m	35.36	28 March 1998	Olympic Oval, Calgary
500 m	34.82	28 March 1998	Olympic Oval, Calgary
2x500 m	68.960	10 March 2001	Utah Olympic Oval, Salt Lake City
500 m	34.32	10 March 2001	Utah Olympic Oval, Salt Lake City

Source: SpeedSkatingStats.com

Awards
Preceded by (Netherlands) Gianni Romme	Oscar Mathisen Award; 2001	Succeeded by (Netherlands) Jochem Uytdehaage
