= Monique Garbrecht-Enfeldt =

German ice speed skater

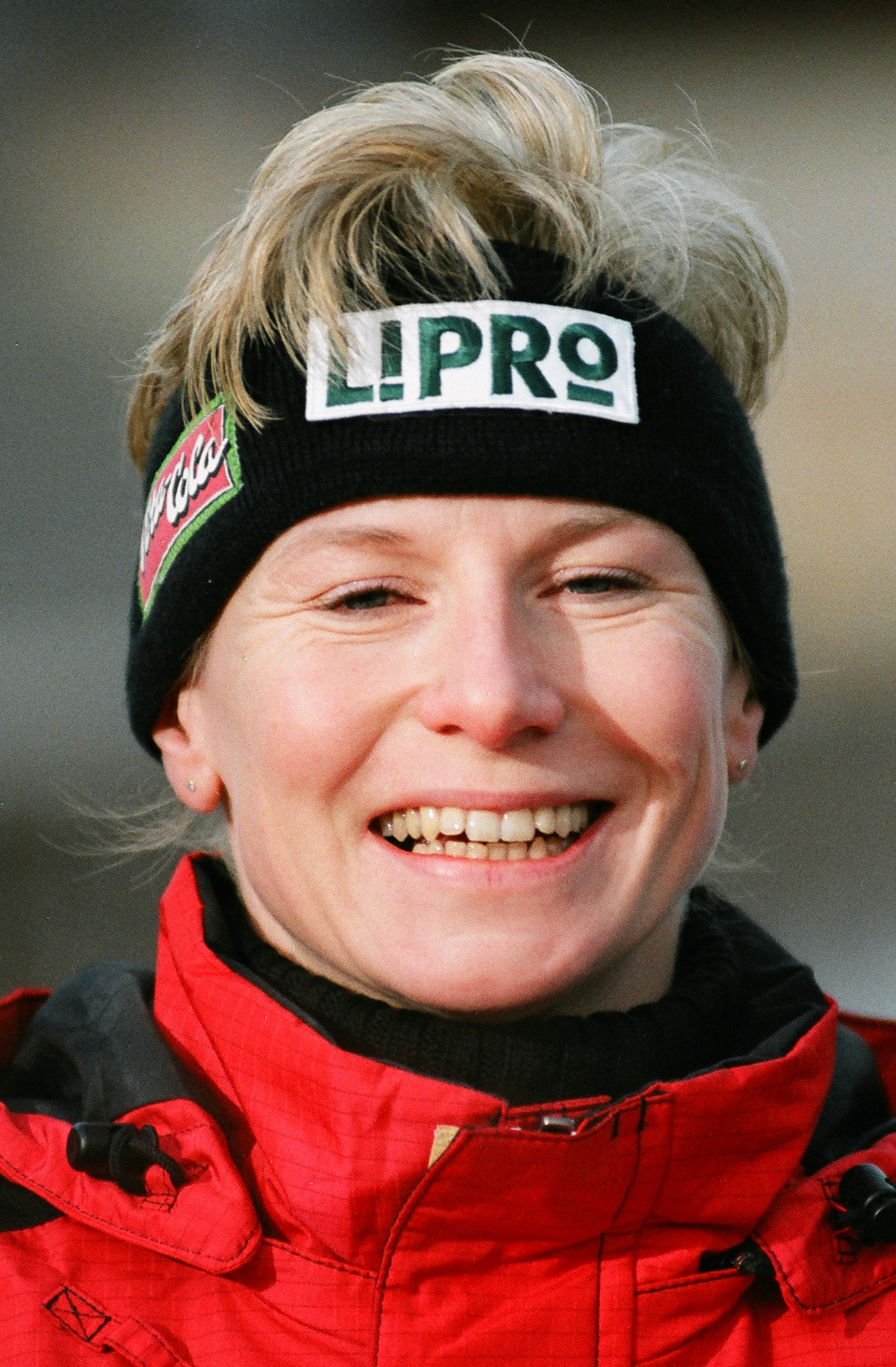
- Garbrecht-Enfeldt in 2004

Personal information
- Born: Monique Garbrecht; 11 December 1968 (age 57) Potsdam, East Germany
- Spouse: Magnus Enfeldt

Sport
- Country: Germany
- Sport: Speed skating
- Coached by: Magnus Enfeldt
- Retired: 1 December 2005
Medal record
Representing Germany
Women's speed skating
Olympic Games
Silver medal – second place	2002 Salt Lake City	500 m
Bronze medal – third place	1992 Albertville	1000 m
World Championships
Gold medal – first place	2003 Berlin	500 m
Gold medal – first place	2003 Calgary	Sprint
Gold medal – first place	2001 Salt Lake City	1000 m
Gold medal – first place	2001 Inzell	Sprint
Gold medal – first place	2000 Nagano	500 m
Gold medal – first place	2000 Nagano	1000 m
Gold medal – first place	2000 Seoul	Sprint
Gold medal – first place	1999 Calgary	Sprint
Gold medal – first place	1991 Inzell	Sprint
Silver medal – second place	2001 Salt Lake City	500 m
Silver medal – second place	1999 Heerenveen	1000 m

Monique Garbrecht-Enfeldt (born 11 December 1968) is a German former ice speed skater. During her 15-year career, she became sprint world champion five times (1991, 1999, 2000, 2001, 2003), and in addition she won four gold medals in the World Single Distance Championships, two on the 500 and two on the 1000 m. She won two Olympic medals within 10 years of each other: first time at the 1992 Winter Olympics in Albertville a bronze, and in the 2002 Olympics in Salt Lake City a silver. She also had planned to qualify for the 2006 Olympics in Turin but poor results in the season's first World Cup races got her to delay the plans. On 1 July 2000 she married her manager, Swedish former speed skater Magnus Enfeldt. On 1 December 2005 she announced her retirement from speed skating.

== Speed skating ==
=== Personal records ===
Personal records
Women's speed skating
Event	Result	Date	Location	Notes
500 m	37.34	13 February 2002	Utah Olympic Oval, Salt Lake City	
1000 m	1:14.13	10 March 2001	Utah Olympic Oval, Salt Lake City	World record until beaten by Sabine Völker on 2 December 2001
1500 m	1:56.96	16 March 2001	Olympic Oval, Calgary	
3000 m	4:25.47	20 March 1987	Medeo, Almaty	World record for juniors until beaten by Svetlana Bazhanova on 3 March 1991
5000 m	7:54.10	21 March 1987	Medeo, Almaty	

=== World records ===
Event	Result	Date	Location	Notes	Beaten by	Date beaten	Ref.
1000 m	1:14.61	21 February 1999	Olympic Oval, Calgary		Chris Witty	3 March 2001	
1000 m	1:14.13	10 March 2001	Utah Olympic Oval, Salt Lake City		Sabine Völker	2 December 2001	
1500 m	2:06.24	21 March 1987	Medeo, Almaty	Junior WR	Svetlana Bazhanova	2 March 1991	
3000 m	4:25.47	20 March 1987	Medeo, Almaty	Junior WR	Svetlana Bazhanova	3 March 1991	
Sprint combination	151.605	20–21 February 1999	Olympic Oval, Calgary		Catriona Le May Doan	6–7 January 2001	
Sprint combination	149.305	11–12 January 2003	Utah Olympic Oval, Salt Lake City		Cindy Klassen	24–25 March 2006	

=== Results overview ===
Season	World Sprint	World Single Distance	World Cup	Olympic Games
1988–89	8th	Not held	23rd 1000 m 28th 3k/5k	Not held
1989–90	6th	Not held	15th 500 m 17th 1000 m	Not held
1990–91	1st place, gold medalist(s)	Not held	5th 500 m (gold) 1000 m	Not held
1991–92	4th	Not held	5th 500 m (bronze) 1000 m 12th 1500 m	4th 500 m (bronze) 1000 m 5th 1500 m
1992–93	14th	Not held	18th 500 m 15th 1000 m 13th 1500 m	Not held
1993–94	6th	Not held	(bronze) 500 m (silver) 1000 m	6th 500 m 5th 1000 m
1994–95	5th	Not held	5th 500 m (bronze) 1000 m	Not held
1995–96	Did not participate			Not held
1996–97	13th	7th 2x500 m	15th 500 m 12th 1000 m	Not held
1997–98	9th	6th 2x500 m 4th 1000 m	6th 500 m 6th 1000 m	8th 2x500 m 10th 1000 m
1998–99	1st place, gold medalist(s)	5th 2x500 m (silver) 1000 m	(silver) 500 m (gold) 1000 m	Not held
1999–00	1st place, gold medalist(s)	(gold) 2x500 m (gold) 1000 m	(gold) 500 m (gold) 1000 m	Not held
2000–01	1st place, gold medalist(s)	(silver) 2x500 m (gold) 1000 m	(silver) 500 m (gold) 1000 m 24th 1500 m	Not held
2001–02	4th	Not held	5th 500 m 8th 1000 m	(silver) 2x500 m 6th 1000 m
2002–03	1st place, gold medalist(s)	(gold) 2x500 m 6th 1000 m	(gold) 500 m (gold) 1000 m	Not held
2003–04	5th	7th 2x500 m 7th 1000 m	4th 500 m 6th 1000 m	Not held
2004–05	9th	6th 2x500 m	8th 500 m 6th 1000 m	Not held
2005–06	Did not participate		48th 500 m	Did not participate
