= Evelyn van Leeuwen =

Dutch wheelchair basketball player

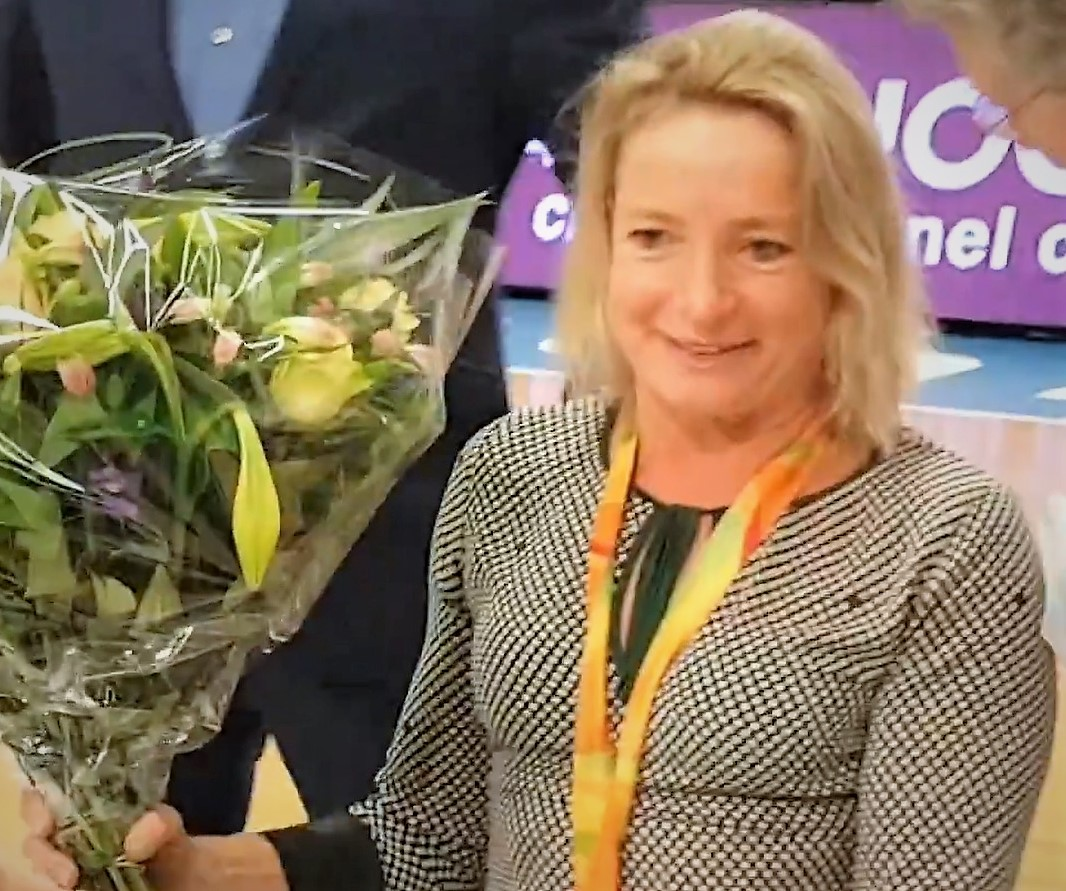
- van Leeuwen receiving tribute in 2016

Personal information
- National team: Netherlands
- Born: 15 May 1972 (age 53)
- Height: 171 cm (5 ft 7 in)
- Weight: 60 kg (132 lb)

Sport
- Country: Netherlands
- Sport: Women's Wheelchair Basketball
- Disability: paraplegic

Evelyn van Leeuwen (born 15 May 1972) is a Dutch wheelchair basketball player from Leiden. She competed at four Paralympic Games between 1996 and 2016. She won the silver medal at the 1996 Summer Paralympics and 20 years later the bronze medal at the 2016 Summer Paralympics.

== Sports career ==
From a young age, van Leeuwen was a low-level competitive speed skater. When she was 18 years old she crashed during a competition in Leiden. There wasn't a proper safety boarding, causing her to become paraplegic. After two years of recovery, she started to again become involved with sports. She started with wheelchair basketball and after contacting the national coach, she was able to become part of the national team.

In 2000, van Leeuwen was a professional player in Badajoz in western Spain while she was conducting research. It was a team of men and she was asked to join them and she stayed there for a year. She also played at the 2000 Summer Paralympics, 2004 Summer Paralympics and 2014 Women's World Wheelchair Basketball Championship. Due to pregnancy, she couldn't compete at the 2008 and 2012 Olympics.

At the beginning of her wheelchair basketball career, van Leeuwen was studying medicine. Later, also next to her wheelchair basketball activity, she was a general practitioner, but she became a paediatrician in 2012 so that she could then work part-time.

In 2016, van Leeuwen returned to the national team and she won a team bronze medal at the 2016 Summer Paralympics in Rio. She was the oldest player on the team but there were two others also in their 40s.

== Personal ==
Van Leeuwen is married to Olympian and Paralympian Jeroen Straathof. They have four daughters and she prioritised them over competing while they were growing up. In time she has learned to cycle and she can walk with the aid of crutches.
