= Mike Ireland =

Canadian speed skater

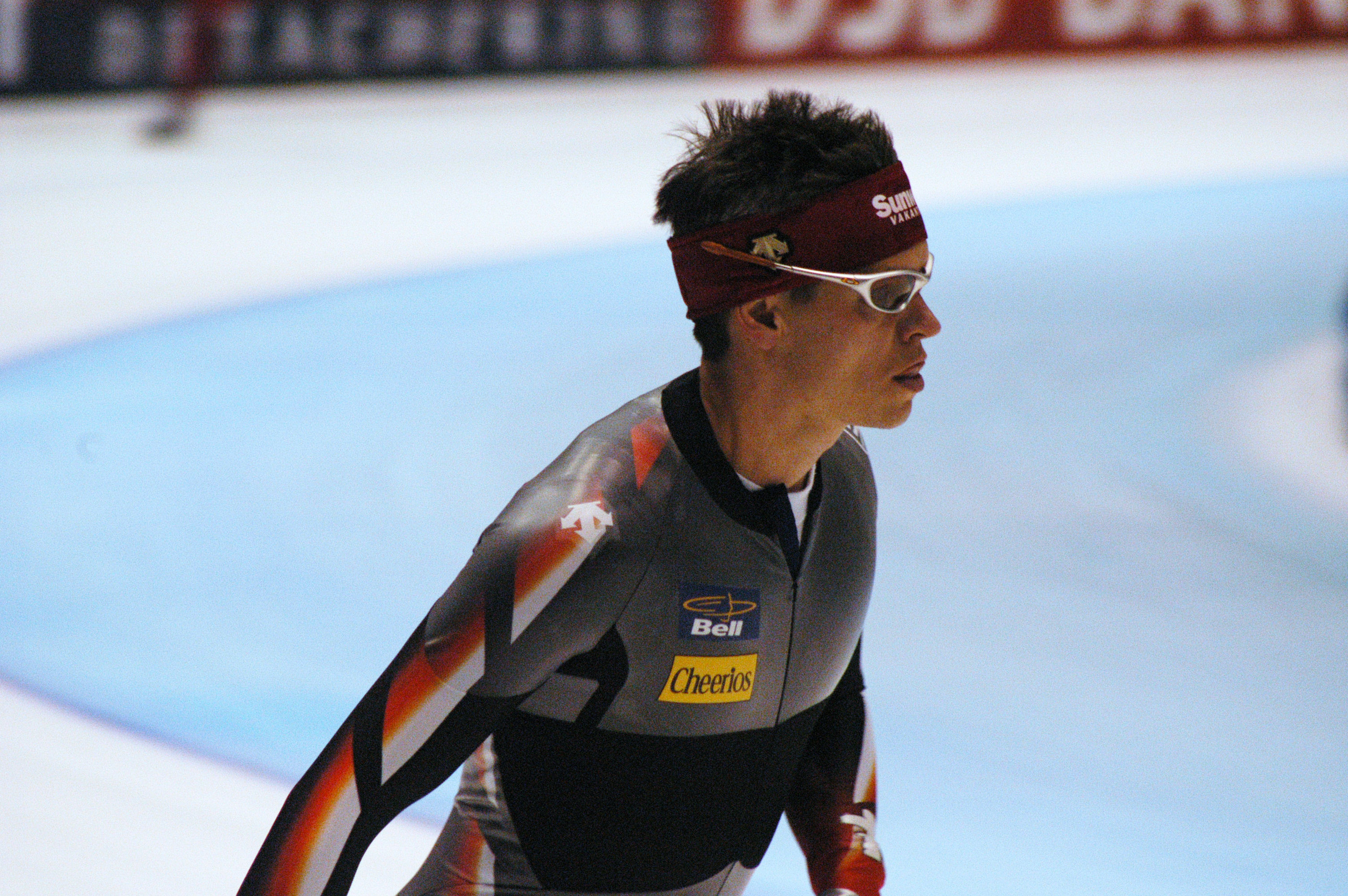
- Ireland in 2007

Personal information
- Full name: Michael James Grant Ireland
- Born: 3 January 1974 (age 52) Winnipeg, Manitoba, Canada
Medal record
Men's speed skating
Representing Canada
World Sprint Championships
Bronze medal – third place	2004 Nagano	Sprint
Bronze medal – third place	2002 Hamar	Sprint
Gold medal – first place	2001 Inzell	Sprint
Silver medal – second place	2000 Seoul	Sprint
World Single Distance Championships
Bronze medal – third place	2004 Seoul	500 m
Silver medal – second place	2000 Nagano	500 m
Bronze medal – third place	2000 Nagano	1000 m

Michael James Grant Ireland (born 3 January 1974) is a Canadian long track speed skater.

Ireland specialises in the 500 m and the 1000 m sprint distances. He participated in the 500 m at the 1994 Winter Olympics (finishing 26th), the 500 m (6th) and 1000 m (14th) at the 2002 Winter Olympics and the 500 m (7th) at the 2006 Winter Olympics. Ireland was the 2001 World Sprint Champion, while winning several more medals at several World Championships (see the next section), and he also set a world record on the 1000 m (only to be broken 8 days later by compatriot Jeremy Wotherspoon). In November 2008 Ireland suffered a severe injury in a World Cup event in Berlin. Later in the same meet teammate Wotherspoon broke his arm in seven places. In a span of two days Canada's two strongest sprinters were placed in serious jeopardy of not skating in the 2010 Olympics in their home country. Both skaters started the long road to recovery and in the 2010 Canadian Olympic trials both succeeded in their comebacks. Ireland qualified in the 500 and is a member of the Canadian 2010 Olympic speed skating team. He skated the fastest time of the trials 34.46 and set a personal best. Often skating in the shadow of his teammate Jeremy Wotherspoon, Ireland is the second most decorated Canadian in speed World Cup sprints.

Ireland was inducted into the Manitoba Sports Hall of Fame in 2012.

== Medals ==
An overview of medals won by Ireland at important championships he participated in, listing the years in which he won each:

== World records ==
Over the course of his career, Ireland skated one world record:

Event	Time	Date	Venue
1000 m	1:08.34	3 March 2001	(Canada) Calgary

Source: SpeedSkatingStats.com
