= 2013 World Single Distance Speed Skating Championships – Men's 10,000 metres =

Men's 10,000 metres at the 2013 World Single Distance Speed Skating Championships
- Venue: Adler Arena, Sochi
- Date: 23 March 2013
- Competitors: 14 from 10 nations
- Winning time: 12:57.69

Medalists
gold medal	Jorrit Bergsma	Netherlands
silver medal	Sven Kramer	Netherlands
bronze medal	Bob de Jong	Netherlands

The men's 10,000 metres race of the 2013 World Single Distance Speed Skating Championships was held on 23 March at 14:25 local time.

== Results ==
Rank	Pair	Lane	Name	Country	Time	Time behind	Notes
1st place, gold medalist(s)	6	o	Jorrit Bergsma	Netherlands	12:57.69		
2nd place, silver medalist(s)	5	o	Sven Kramer	Netherlands	12:59.71	+2.02	
3rd place, bronze medalist(s)	6	i	Bob de Jong	Netherlands	13:00.26	+2.57	
4	7	i	Lee Seung-hoon	South Korea	13:14.02	+16.33	
5	4	i	Bart Swings	Belgium	13:19.15	+21.46	
6	2	o	Shane Dobbin	New Zealand	13:23.65	+25.96	
7	7	o	Marco Weber	Germany	13:24.20	+26.51	
8	4	o	Patrick Beckert	Germany	13:26.79	+29.10	
9	1	o	Aleksandr Rumyantsev	Russia	13:29.05	+31.36	
10	5	i	Moritz Geisreiter	Germany	13:29.20	+31.51	
11	3	i	Jordan Belchos	Canada	13:33.10	+35.41	
12	2	i	Jonathan Kuck	United States	13:40.41	+42.72	
	3	o	Marco Cignini	Italy	DSQ	–	
	1	i	Roger Schneider	Switzerland	DSQ	–	
