= 2012 World Single Distance Speed Skating Championships – Men's 5000 metres =

The men's 5000 metres race of the 2012 World Single Distance Speed Skating Championships was held on March 23 at 15:00 local time.

== Results ==
Rank	Pair	Lane	Name	Country	Time	Time behind	Notes
1st place, gold medalist(s)	12	o	Sven Kramer	Netherlands	6:13.87		
2nd place, silver medalist(s)	11	i	Bob de Jong	Netherlands	6:15.26	+1.39	
3rd place, bronze medalist(s)	10	o	Jonathan Kuck	United States	6:16.28	+2.41	
4	12	i	Jan Blokhuijsen	Netherlands	6:16.82	+2.95	
5	11	o	Alexis Contin	France	6:21.44	+7.57	
6	8	o	Ivan Skobrev	Russia	6:24.05	+10.18	
7	5	i	Denis Yuskov	Russia	6:24.74	+10.87	
8	7	i	Patrick Beckert	Germany	6:26.25	+12.38	
9	9	i	Moritz Geisreiter	Germany	6:26.64	+12.77	
10	9	o	Bart Swings	Belgium	6:28.07	+14.20	
11	8	i	Shane Dobbin	New Zealand	6:28.48	+14.61	
12	6	o	Dmitry Babenko	Kazakhstan	6:28.82	+14.95	
13	6	i	Jordan Belchos	Canada	6:30.79	+16.92	
14	2	i	Jan Szymański	Poland	6:31.16	+17.29	
15	7	o	Alexej Baumgärtner	Germany	6:32.11	+18.24	
16	3	o	Hiroki Hirako	Japan	6:32.73	+18.86	
17	10	i	Sverre Lunde Pedersen	Norway	6:35.10	+21.23	
18	4	i	Brian Hansen	United States	6:37.90	+24.03	
19	4	o	Ewen Fernandez	France	6:38.58	+24.71	
20	1	o	Roland Cieslak	Poland	6:38.90	+25.03	
21	1	i	Mathieu Giroux	Canada	6:42.95	+29.08	
22	3	i	Kristian Reistad Fredriksen	Norway	6:44.96	+31.09	
23	5	o	Joo Hyung-joon	South Korea	6:48.67	+34.80	
24	2	o	Ferre Spruyt	Belgium	6:50.42	+36.65	
