= Gianni Romme =

Dutch speed skater

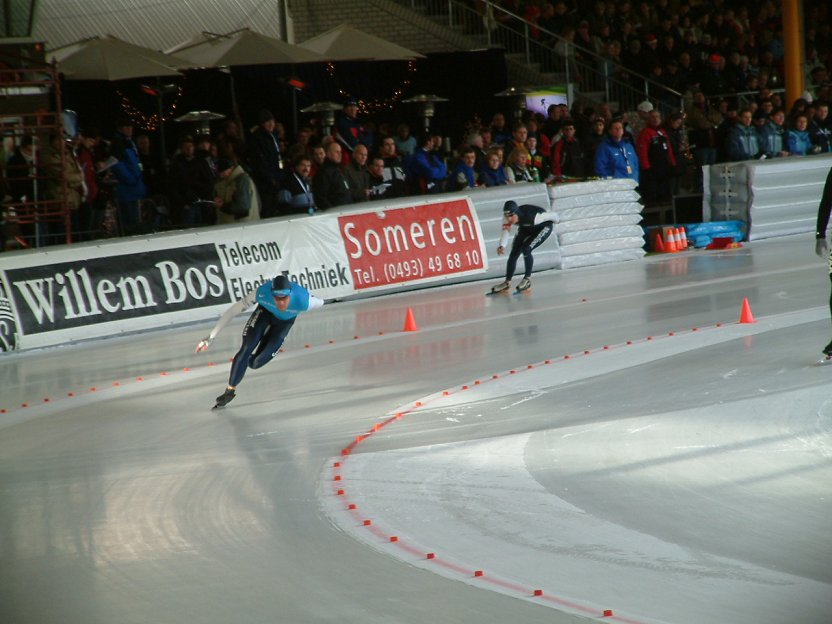
- Gianni Romme skating against Bob de Jong in 2003

Personal information
- Nationality: Dutch
- Born: 12 February 1973 (age 53) Lage Zwaluwe, Netherlands
- Height: 1.90 m (6 ft 3 in)
- Website: www.gianniromme.nl

Sport
- Country: Netherlands
- Sport: Speed skating
- Turned pro: 1992
- Coached by: Henk Gemser
- Retired: 2006

Achievements and titles
- Personal best(s): 500 m: 36.97 (2002); 1000 m: 1:14.33 (1999); 1500 m: 1:47.88 (2002); 3000 m: 3:40.02 (2002); 5000 m: 6:14.70 (2004); 10 000 m: 13:03.40 (2002)
Medal record
Men's speed skating
Representing the Netherlands
Olympic Games
Gold medal – first place	1998 Nagano	5000 m
Gold medal – first place	1998 Nagano	10,000 m
Silver medal – second place	2002 Salt Lake City	10,000 m
World Allround Championships
Gold medal – first place	2000 Milwaukee	Allround
Gold medal – first place	2003 Gothenburg	Allround
World Single Distance Championships
Gold medal – first place	1996 Hamar	10,000 m
Gold medal – first place	1997 Warsaw	10,000 m
Gold medal – first place	1998 Calgary	5000 m
Gold medal – first place	1998 Calgary	10,000 m
Gold medal – first place	1999 Heerenveen	5000 m
Gold medal – first place	2000 Nagano	5000 m
Gold medal – first place	2000 Nagano	10,000 m
Silver medal – second place	1997 Warsaw	5000 m
Silver medal – second place	1999 Heerenveen	10,000 m
Bronze medal – third place	1996 Hamar	5000 m
Bronze medal – third place	2001 Salt Lake City	5000 m
Bronze medal – third place	2004 Seoul	5000 m
European Championships
Gold medal – first place	2003 Heerenveen	Allround

Gianni Petrus Cornelis Romme (born 12 February 1973) is a Dutch marathoner and a former long track speed skater. He won two gold medals at the 1998 Winter Olympics in Nagano and was the World all-round champion in 2000 and 2003. Romme has been a coach since the 2006–07 speed skating season.

== Career ==
During his long track career, Romme prevailed in long distances (5000 and 10000 metres). His greatest triumphs came at the 1998 Winter Olympics, where he won both events. Four years later, at the 2002 Winter Olympics, he captured the silver medal in the 10000 metre event, beaten only by compatriot Jochem Uytdehaage.

He has also won numerous gold medals at the World Single Distance Championships in both the 5000 m and the 10000 m, was two times World Allround Champion, and spent some time (118 days in total) at the top of the all-time world ranking, the Adelskalender.

As of 2006–07, Romme started his own coaching career. International speed skaters Anni Friesinger, Ralf van der Rijst and Risto Rosendahl decided to join his team. Romme himself wanted to continue his career, but announced at the opening day of the 2007 KNSB Dutch Single Distance Championships that he would no longer participate in long track speed skating, only in marathon speed skating.

== Records ==
=== Personal records ===
Personal records
Men's speed skating
Event	Result	Date	Location	Notes
500 meter	36.97	2 February 2002	Salt Lake City	
1000 meter	1:14.33	11 December 1999	Inzell	
1500 meter	1:47.88	2 February 2002	Salt Lake City	
3000 meter	3:40.02	3 February 2002	Salt Lake City	
5000 meter	6:14.70	20 November 2004	Berlin	
10000 meter	13:03.40	26 November 2000	Heerenveen	

Source: www.isu.org & SpeedskatingResults.com

Gianni Romme has an Adelskalender score of 149.570 points.

=== World records ===
Event	Result	Date	Location	Notes
5000 meter	6:30.63	7 December 1997	Heerenveen	
5000 meter	6:22.20	8 February 1998	Nagano	
10000 meter	13:15.33	17 February 1998	Nagano	
5000 meter	6:21.49	27 March 1998	Calgary	
10000 meter	13:08.71	29 March 1998	Calgary	
5000 meter	6:18.72	30 January 2000	Calgary	
3000 meter	3:42.75	11 August 2000	Calgary	
10000 meter	13:03.40	26 November 2000	Heerenveen	

== Tournament overview ==
Season	Dutch Championships Single Distances	Dutch Championships Allround	European Championships Allround	World Championships Allround	Olympic Games	ISU World Cup	World Championships Single Distances
1991–92		ALKMAAR 19th 500m 6th 5000m 19th 1500m 5th 10000m 9th overall					
1992–93	DEVENTER 11th 5000m 9th 10000m	ASSEN 13th 500m 9th 5000m 9th 1500m 9th 10000m 11th overall					
1993–94	HEERENVEEN 12th 1000m 9th 1500m 5th 5000m 6th 10000m	THE HAGUE 9th 500m (silver) 5000m 6th 1500m 4th 10000m 6th overall					
1994–95	THE HAGUE 6th 1500m 17th 5000m 4th 10000m	ASSEN 16th 500m 4th 5000m 5th 1500m 4th 10000m 5th overall					
1995–96	GRONINGEN (gold) 5000m (silver) 10000m					19th 1500m (silver) 5000/10000m	HAMAR (bronze) 5000m (gold) 10000m
1996–97		ASSEN 15th 500m (gold) 5000m 6th 1500m (gold) 10000m (bronze) overall				11th 1500m (silver) 5000/10000m	WARSAW (silver) 5000m (gold) 10000m
1997–98					NAGANO (gold) 5000m (gold) 10000m	46th 1500m (gold) 5000/10000m	CALGARY (gold) 5000m (gold) 10000m
1998–99	GRONINGEN 12th 1500m (gold) 5000m (silver) 10000m		HEERENVEEN 16th 500m 12th 5000m 20th 1500m 7th 10000m 15th overall			4th 5000/10000m	HEERENVEEN (gold) 5000m (silver) 10000m
1999–2000		THE HAGUE 8th 500m (gold) 5000m 5th 1500m (gold) 10000m (gold) overall		MILWAUKEE 12th 500m (gold) 5000m 4th 1500m (gold) 10000m (gold) overall		15th 1500m (gold) 5000/10000m	NAGANO (gold) 5000m (gold) 10000m
2000–01	THE HAGUE (gold) 1500m (gold) 5000m	HEERENVEEN 13th 500m 5th 5000m DNS 1500m DNS 10000m NC overall				11th 1500m (gold) 5000/10000m	SALT LAKE CITY (bronze) 5000m
2001–02	GRONINGEN 15th 1500m (gold) 5000m	ALKMAAR 6th 500m (gold) 5000m (silver) 1500m (gold) 10000m (gold) overall		HEERENVEEN 12th 500m (silver) 5000m DQ 1500m DNQ 10000m NC overall	SALT LAKE CITY (silver) 10000m	(gold) 5000/10000m	
2002–03	UTRECHT 4th 1500m (gold) 5000m 5th 10000m	ASSEN 7th 500m (gold) 5000m (gold) 1500m (silver) 10000m (gold) overall	HEERENVEEN 17th 500m (gold) 5000m (gold) 1500m (gold) 10000m (gold) overall	GÖTENBORG 17th 500m (gold) 5000m (bronze) 1500m (gold) 10000m (gold) overall		29th 1500m 5th 5000/10000m	
2003–04	HEERENVEEN 7th 1500m 5th 5000m 7th 10000m	EINDHOVEN 15th 500m 4th 5000m 8th 1500m 4th 10000m 4th overall	HEERENVEEN 16th 500m (bronze) 5000m 8th 1500m (silver) 10000m 4th overall			7th 5000/10000m	SEOUL (bronze) 5000m 9th 10000m
2004–05	ASSEN (bronze) 5000m (silver) 10000m	HEERENVEEN 10th 500m (silver) 5000m 8th 1500m 4th 10000m 5th overall				(bronze) 5000/10000m	INZELL 4th 10000m
2005–06	HEERENVEEN 11th 1500m 5th 5000m 5th 10000m	UTRECHT 16th 500m (bronze) 5000m 4th 1500m (bronze) 10000m 6th overall	HAMAR 27th 500m 12th 5000m 18th 1500m DNQ 10000m NC overall			19th 5000/10000m	

- DQ = Disqualified
- DNQ = Did not qualify for the distance
- NC = No classification
- DNS = Did not start

== World Cup overview ==
Season	1500 meter					
1994–1995						
1995–1996	–	11th	–	–	13th	
1996–1997	11th	–	9th	DQ	9th	
1997–1998	23rd	–	9th(b)	–	–	–
1998–1999						
1999–2000	5th	4th	–	–	–	
2000–2001	4th	3rd place, bronze medalist(s)	–	–	–	
2001–2002						
2002–2003	–	1st(b)	10th	–	–	–
2003–2004						
2004–2005						
2005–2006						

Season	5000/10000 meter						
1994–1995	–	–	–	24th	–	–	–
1995–1996	2nd place, silver medalist(s)	2nd place, silver medalist(s)	3rd place, bronze medalist(s)	1st place, gold medalist(s)	3rd place, bronze medalist(s)	6th	(silver) *
1996–1997	1st place, gold medalist(s)	2nd place, silver medalist(s)	2nd place, silver medalist(s)	7th*	2nd place, silver medalist(s)	2nd place, silver medalist(s)	
1997–1998	1st place, gold medalist(s)	1st place, gold medalist(s)	3rd place, bronze medalist(s)	(gold) *	–	–	
1998–1999	1st place, gold medalist(s)	(gold) *	18th	–	3rd place, bronze medalist(s)		
1999–2000	1st place, gold medalist(s)	(gold) *	1st place, gold medalist(s)	–	1st place, gold medalist(s)		
2000–2001	1st place, gold medalist(s)	(gold) *	1st place, gold medalist(s)	1st place, gold medalist(s)	11th		
2001–2002	1st place, gold medalist(s)	1st place, gold medalist(s)	1st place, gold medalist(s)	2nd place, silver medalist(s)	2nd place, silver medalist(s)		
2002–2003	1st place, gold medalist(s)	8th	5th	9th*	–	5th	
2003–2004	4th	–	–	2nd place, silver medalist(s)	5th	4th*	
2004–2005	1st place, gold medalist(s)	1st place, gold medalist(s)	(gold) *	4th	7th	4th*	
2005–2006	14th	17th	13th*	–	13th		

– = Did not participate
* = 10000m
(b) = Division B

== Medals won ==
Championship	Gold (gold)	Silver (silver)	Bronze (bronze)
Dutch Single Distances	6	3	1
Dutch Allround Single Distances	8	4	2
Dutch Allround Classification	3	0	1
European Allround Single Distances	3	1	1
European Allround	1	0	0
World Allround Single Distances	4	0	1
World Allround Classification	2	0	0
World Single Distances	7	2	3
World Cup Single Distances	22	10	5
World Cup Classification	4	2	1
Olympic Games	2	1	0
Total	62	23	15

Awards
Preceded by (Netherlands) Rintje Ritsma	Oscar Mathisen Award; 2000	Succeeded by (Japan) Hiroyasu Shimizu
Preceded by (Netherlands) Marcel Wouda	Dutch Sportsman of the Year; 1998	Succeeded by (Netherlands) Pieter van den Hoogenband
Preceded by (Netherlands) Rintje Ritsma	Ard Schenk Award; 2001	Succeeded by (Netherlands) Gerard van Velde
