= 2003 World Single Distance Speed Skating Championships =

Sporting competition

World Single Distance Speed Skating Championships
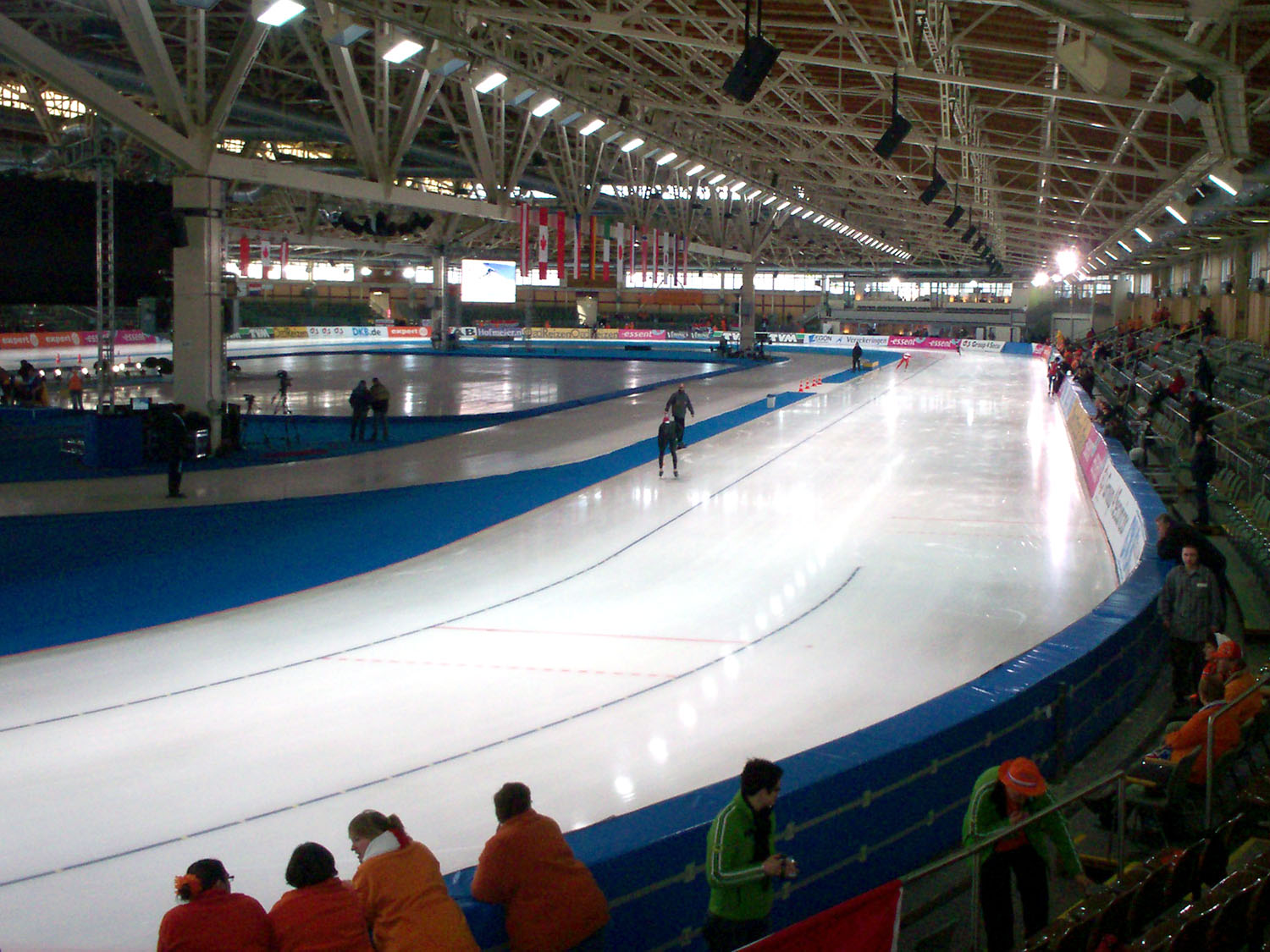
- Sportforum Hohenschönhausen (Berlin)
- Venue: Sportforum Hohenschönhausen (Berlin)
- Dates: 14–16 March 2003

The 2003 World Single Distance Speed Skating Championships were held 14–16 March 2003 in the Sportforum Hohenschönhausen, Berlin, Germany.

== Schedule ==
Date	Events
March 14	500 m men (1st)
March 14	500 m men (2nd)
March 14	5000 m men
March 14	1500 m women
March 15	1500 m men
March 15	500 m women (1st)
March 15	500 m women (2nd)
March 15	3000 m women
March 16	1000 m men
March 16	10000 m men
March 16	1000 m women
March 16	5000 m women

== Medal summary ==
=== Men's events ===
Event	Gold		Silver		Bronze	
500 m	Jeremy Wotherspoon; Canada	1:09.97; 35.12; 34.85	Hiroyasu Shimizu; Japan	1:10.36; 35.19; 35.17	Erben Wennemars; Netherlands	1:10.54; 35.53; 35.01
1000 m	Erben Wennemars; Netherlands	1:09.71	Gerard van Velde; Netherlands	1:10.52	Joey Cheek; United States	1:10.94
1500 m	Erben Wennemars; Netherlands	1:47.80	Ralf van der Rijst; Netherlands	1:48.46	Joey Cheek; United States	1:48.56
5000 m	Jochem Uytdehaage; Netherlands	6:25.29	Bob de Jong; Netherlands	6:25.76	Carl Verheijen; Netherlands	6:30.46
10000 m	Bob de Jong; Netherlands	13:21,33	Carl Verheijen; Netherlands	13:31,53	Lasse Sætre; Norway	13:40.69

=== Women's events ===
Event	Gold		Silver		Bronze	
500 m	Monique Garbrecht-Enfeldt; Germany	1:17.17; 38.67; 38.50	Wang Manli; China	1:17.29; 38.54; 38.75	Anzhelika Kotyuga; Belarus	1:17.30; 38.51; 38.79
1000 m	Anni Friesinger; Germany	1:16.85	Jennifer Rodriguez; United States	1:17.28	Cindy Klassen; Canada	1:17.36
1500 m	Anni Friesinger; Germany	1:57.43	Maki Tabata; Japan	1:59.30	Jennifer Rodriguez; United States	1:59.31
3000 m	Anni Friesinger; Germany	4:06.07	Claudia Pechstein; Germany	4:07.99	Gretha Smit; Netherlands	4:08.91
5000 m	Claudia Pechstein; Germany	7:04.52	Clara Hughes; Canada	7:06.31	Gretha Smit; Netherlands	7:06.34

=== Medal table ===
Rank	Nation	Gold	Silver	Bronze	Total
1	Germany (GER)	5	1	0	6
2	Netherlands (NED)	4	4	4	12
3	Canada (CAN)	1	1	1	3
4	Japan (JPN)	0	2	0	2
5	United States (USA)	0	1	3	4
6	China (CHN)	0	1	0	1
7	Belarus (BLR)	0	0	1	1
7	Norway (NOR)	0	0	1	1
Totals (8 entries)		10	10	10	30
