= 2015 World Single Distance Speed Skating Championships – Men's 5000 metres =

metres at the 2015 World Single Distance Speed Skating Championships
- Venue: Thialf, Heerenveen
- Date: 14 February 2015
- Competitors: 20 from 12 nations
- Winning time: 6:09.65

Medalists
gold medal	Sven Kramer	Netherlands
silver medal	Jorrit Bergsma	Netherlands
bronze medal	Douwe de Vries	Netherlands

The Men's 5000 metres race of the 2015 World Single Distance Speed Skating Championships was held on 14 February 2015.

== Results ==
The race was started at 13:00.

Rank	Pair	Lane	Name	Country	Time	Diff
1st place, gold medalist(s)	9	o	Sven Kramer	NED	6:09.65	
2nd place, silver medalist(s)	7	i	Jorrit Bergsma	NED	6:11.53	+1.88
3rd place, bronze medalist(s)	8	i	Douwe de Vries	NED	6:18.24	+8.59
4	1	i	Denis Yuskov	RUS	6:19.74	+10.09
5	5	o	Alexis Contin	FRA	6:19.99	+10.34
6	5	i	Ted-Jan Bloemen	CAN	6:21.16	+11.51
7	7	o	Patrick Beckert	GER	6:21.63	+11.98
8	8	o	Lee Seung-hoon	KOR	6:23.02	+13.37
9	9	i	Bart Swings	BEL	6:23.77	+14.12
10	10	o	Aleksandr Rumyantsev	RUS	6:24.41	+14.76
11	10	i	Sverre Lunde Pedersen	NOR	6:24.76	+15.11
12	3	o	Peter Michael	NZL	6:26.94	+17.29
13	6	o	Håvard Bøkko	NOR	6:27.00	+17.35
14	6	i	Andrea Giovannini	ITA	6:29.73	+20.08
15	2	i	Alexej Baumgärtner	GER	6:32.90	+23.25
16	4	o	Danil Sinitsyn	RUS	6:33.45	+23.80
17	3	i	Shane Williamson	JPN	6:34.33	+24.68
18	2	o	Viktor Hald Thorup	DEN	6:34.77	+25.12
19	4	i	Jonas Pflug	GER	6:35.19	+25.54
20	1	o	Simen Spieler Nilsen	NOR	6:36.89	+27.24
