= Jeroen Straathof =

Dutch cyclist and speed skater

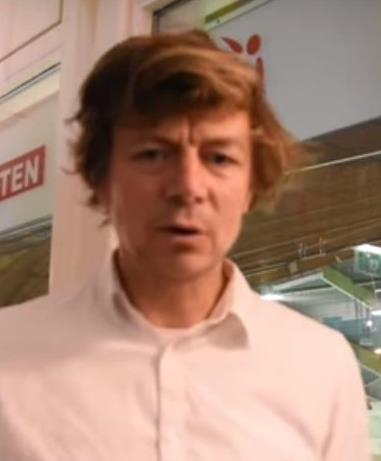
- Straathof (2017)

Personal information
- Nationality: Dutch
- Born: Johannes Nicolaas Maria Straathof; 18 November 1972 (age 53) Zoeterwoude, Netherlands

Sport
- Country: Netherlands
- Sport: Speed skating
- Turned pro: 1992
- Retired: 2004

Achievements and titles
- Personal best(s): 500 m: 36.26 (2000); 1000 m: 1:10.76 (2000); 1500 m: 1:47.76 (1998); 3000 m: 3:51.87 (1998); 5000 m: 6:53.82 (1994); 10 000 m: 14:48.80 (1994)
Medal record
Men's speed skating
Representing the Netherlands
World Junior Championships
| Gold medal – first place | 1992 Warsaw | Allround |
World Single Distance Championships
| Gold medal – first place | 1996 Hamar | 1500 m |
Men's track cycling
Paralympic Games
| Gold medal – first place | 2000 Sydney | Individual pursuit tandem open |
IPC World Championships
| Silver medal – second place | 1998 | Individual pursuit tandem open |
IPC European Championships
| Gold medal – first place | 1999 | Individual pursuit tandem open |

Johannes Nicolaas Maria ("Jeroen") Straathof (born 18 November 1972) is a retired Dutch racing cyclist and speed skater. Straathof was the first, and still the only, athlete in the world to represent his country at the Summer Olympics, the Winter Olympics and the Paralympics.

== Life ==
Straathof started his sports career as a speed skater, becoming World Junior Champion in Warsaw 1992. His best distance was the 1500 metres, and as the longest distances were his worst he only participated in one international all-round championship in his career. He made his Olympic debut at the 1994 Winter Olympics held in Lillehammer. He was qualified for the 1500 metres and placed 9th. In 1996 the World Single Distance Championships were introduced, and Straathof became the first World Champion over 1500 metres. He was never able to equal this performance or come close to winning another medal, and he made a switch to track cycling.

As pilot at the tandem he teamed up with visually handicapped cyclist Jan Mulder. In 1998 they took part in the World Championships and won the silver medal. At the 1999 European Championships they won the gold, and a year later they were acclaimed 2000 Summer Paralympics champions.

Straathof decided to make another switch, and became part of the Dutch Team Pursuit team that qualified for the 2002 World Championships, where they placed seventh. A year later they placed 9th, and in 2004 they improved their ranking to the fourth position. The team, composed of Straathof, Jens Mouris, Peter Schep and Levi Heimans, also qualified for the 2004 Summer Olympics where they came in fifth. After those Olympics Straathof ended his professional sports career.

Finally, Straathof is one of the few athletes who have competed in both the Summer and Winter Olympic games.

== Private life ==
Straathof is the brother of former speed skater Judith Straathof. He is married to wheelchair basketball player Evelyn van Leeuwen and they have four children.

== Speed skating ==
=== Personal records ===
Personal records
Men's Speed skating
| Event | Result | Date | Location | Notes |
| 500 m | 36.26 | 19 March 2000 | Calgary | |
| 1000 m | 1:10.76 | 18 March 2000 | Calgary | |
| 1500 m | 1:47.76 | 19 February 1999 | Calgary | |
| 3000 m | 3:51.87 | 15 August 1998 | Calgary | |
| 5000 m | 6:53.82 | 4 December 1994 | Heerenveen | |
| 10000 m | 14:48.80 | 29 December 1993 | Heerenveen | |

== Tournament overview ==
| Season | Dutch Championships Allround | Dutch Championships Single Distances | Dutch Championships Sprint | Olympic Games | World Championships Single Distances | World Championships Allround | World Championships Sprint | World Championships Junior Allround |
|---|---|---|---|---|---|---|---|---|
| 1990–1991 | | THE HAGUE 14th 1500m | | | | | | |
| 1991–1992 | ALKMAAR 6th 500m 14th 5000m 7th 1500m DNQ 10000m 13th overall | HEERENVEEN 6th 1000m 5th 1500m 12th 5000m | | | | | | WARSAW 8th 500m (gold) 3000m (gold) 1500m 6th 5000m (gold) overall |
| 1992–1993 | ASSEN 11th 500m 10th 5000m 4th 1500m 12th 10000m 10th overall | DEVENTER (bronze) 1500m 12th 5000m 13th 10000m | | | | | | |
| 1993–1994 | | HEERENVEEN 5th 1500m 11th 5000m 10th 10000m | | LILLEHAMMER 9th 1500m | | | | |
| 1994–1995 | ASSEN 7th 500m 5th 5000m (bronze) 1500m 7th 10000m 6th overall | THE HAGUE (bronze) 1500m 7th 5000m 12th 10000m | | | | BASELGA di PINÈ 16th 500m 16th 5000m 6th 1500m DNQ 10000m 13th overall | | |
| 1995–1996 | THE HAGUE 4th 500m 7th 5000m (bronze) 1500m 9th 10000m 6th overall | GRONINGEN (silver) 1500m | | | HAMAR (gold) 1500m | | | |
| 1996–1997 | ASSEN 5th 500m 9th 5000m (bronze) 1500m DNQ 10000m 13th overall | | | | WARSAW 5th 1500m | | | |
| 1997–1998 | | HEERENVEEN 6th 1000m 6th 1500m | GRONINGEN 14th 500m 6th 1000m 20th 500m 5th 1000m 20th overall | | CALGARY 7th 1500m | | | |
| 1998–1999 | | GRONINGEN 17th 500m 5th 1000m (silver) 1500m | GRONINGEN 6th 500m 6th 1000m 20th 500m 20th 1000m 19th overall | | | | | |
| 1999–2000 | | DEVENTER 7th 500m 20th 1000m (bronze) 1500m | | | | | | |
| 2000–2001 | | THE HAGUE (bronze) 500m (bronze) 1000m 5th 1500m | HEERENVEEN 4th 500m (silver) 1000m 4th 500m (silver) 1000m (bronze) overall | | SALT LAKE CITY 15th 1500m | | INZELL 35th 500m 41st 1000m 33rd 500m 21st 1000m 38th overall | |
| 2001–2002 | | GRONINGEN 9th 500m 11th 1000m 16th 1500m | | | | | | |

- DNQ = Did not qualify for the last event

== Cycling ==
=== Results ===
Track cycling (pilot at the tandem), 4 km pursuit

- World championships 1998: Silver medal
- European championships 1999: European champion
- Paralympic game Sydney 2000: Paralympic champion

Track Cycling, 4 km team pursuit

- World championships 2002: 7th
- World championships 2003: 9th
- World championships 2004: 4th
- Olympic games Athene 2004: 5th
