= 2004 World Single Distance Speed Skating Championships =

International speed skating competition

World Single Distance Speed Skating Championships
- Taereung Indoor Ice Rink (Seoul)
- Venue: Taereung Indoor Ice Rink (Seoul)
- Dates: 12–14 March 2004

The 2004 World Single Distance Speed Skating Championships were held between 12 and 14 March 2004 in the Taereung Indoor Ice Rink, Seoul, South Korea.

== Schedule ==
Date	Events
12 March	500 m men (1st)
12 March	500 m men (2nd)
12 March	5000 m men
12 March	1500 m women
13 March	1500 m men
13 March	500 m women (1st)
13 March	500 m women (2nd)
13 March	3000 m women
14 March	1000 m men
14 March	10000 m men
14 March	1000 m women
14 March	5000 m women

== Medal summary ==
=== Men's events ===
Event	Gold		Silver		Bronze	
500 m	Jeremy Wotherspoon; Canada	1:10.79; 35.54; 35.25	Dmitry Lobkov; Russia	1:11.14; 35.68; 35.46	Mike Ireland; Canada	1:11.20; 35.40; 35.80
1000 m	Erben Wennemars; Netherlands	1:10.66	Jeremy Wotherspoon; Canada	1:11.12	Masaki Kobayashi; Japan	1:11.58
1500 m	Shani Davis; United States	1:48.64	Mark Tuitert; Netherlands	1:49.29	Erben Wennemars; Netherlands	1:49.40
5000 m	Chad Hedrick; United States	6:34.37	Carl Verheijen; Netherlands	6:38.15	Gianni Romme; Netherlands	6:38.73
10000 m	Carl Verheijen; Netherlands	13:37,15	Bob de Jong; Netherlands	13:45,52	Chad Hedrick; United States	13:54.98

=== Women's events ===
Event	Gold		Silver		Bronze	
500 m	Wang Manli; China	1:16.88; 38.65; 38.23	Anzhelika Kotyuga; Belarus	1:17.86; 39.17; 38.69	Ren Hui; China	1:18.32; 39.16; 39.16
1000 m	Anni Friesinger; Germany	1:17.82	Marianne Timmer; Netherlands	1:18.50	Cindy Klassen; Canada	1:18.68
1500 m	Anni Friesinger; Germany	2:00.48	Cindy Klassen; Canada	2:01.21	Jennifer Rodriguez; United States	2:01.54
3000 m	Claudia Pechstein; Germany	4:13.46	Gretha Smit; Netherlands; Anni Friesinger; Germany	4:13.85		
5000 m	Clara Hughes; Canada	7:10.66	Gretha Smit; Netherlands	7:11.17	Claudia Pechstein; Germany	7:13.42

== Medal table ==
Rank	Nation	Gold	Silver	Bronze	Total
1	Germany (GER)	3	1	1	5
2	Netherlands (NED)	2	6	2	10
3	Canada (CAN)	2	2	2	6
4	United States (USA)	2	0	2	4
5	China (CHN)	1	0	1	2
6	Belarus (BLR)	0	1	0	1
6	Russia (RUS)	0	1	0	1
8	Japan (JPN)	0	0	1	1
Totals (8 entries)		10	11	9	30
