= 2013 World Single Distance Speed Skating Championships – Men's 5000 metres =

Men's 5000 metres at the 2013 World Single Distance Speed Skating Championships
- Venue: Adler Arena, Sochi
- Date: 22 March 2013
- Competitors: 23 from 12 nations
- Winning time: 6:14.41

Medalists
gold medal	Sven Kramer	Netherlands
silver medal	Jorrit Bergsma	Netherlands
bronze medal	Ivan Skobrev	Russia

The men's 5000 metres race of the 2013 World Single Distance Speed Skating Championships was held on 22 March at 17:00 local time.

== Results ==
Rank	Pair	Lane	Name	Country	Time	Time behind	Notes
1st place, gold medalist(s)	12	o	Sven Kramer	Netherlands	6:14.41		
2nd place, silver medalist(s)	11	o	Jorrit Bergsma	Netherlands	6:17.94	+3.53	
3rd place, bronze medalist(s)	8	i	Ivan Skobrev	Russia	6:18.31	+3.90	
4	7	o	Denis Yuskov	Russia	6:21.46	+7.05	
5	11	i	Bob de Jong	Netherlands	6:23.00	+8.59	
6	9	o	Bart Swings	Belgium	6:23.01	+8.60	
7	9	i	Sverre Lunde Pedersen	Norway	6:24.38	+9.97	
8	12	i	Lee Seung-hoon	South Korea	6:26.78	+12.37	
9	8	o	Patrick Beckert	Germany	6:27.27	+12.86	
10	3	o	Shane Dobbin	New Zealand	6:28.04	+13.63	
11	10	i	Moritz Geisreiter	Germany	6:28.71	+14.30	
12	4	o	Jonathan Kuck	United States	6:28.88	+14.47	
13	7	i	Aleksandr Rumyantsev	Russia	6:30.03	+15.62	
14	6	i	Alexis Contin	France	6:30.47	+16.06	
15	3	i	Jan Szymański	Poland	6:30.68	+16.27	
16	5	o	Marco Weber	Germany	6:31.00	+16.59	
17	6	o	Jordan Belchos	Canada	6:36.22	+21.81	
18	2	o	Kim Cheol-min	South Korea	6:38.16	+23.75	
19	5	i	Dmitry Babenko	Kazakhstan	6:38.25	+23.84	
20	2	i	Emery Lehman	United States	6:38.39	+23.98	
21	4	i	Joo Hyung-joon	South Korea	6:39.94	+25.53	
22	1	i	Roland Cieslak	Poland	6:42.57	+28.16	
	10	o	Håvard Bøkko	Norway	DNF		
