= 2011 World Single Distance Speed Skating Championships – Women's 1500 metres =

The Women's 1500m race of the 2011 World Single Distance Speed Skating Championships was held on March 11 at 14:55 local time.

== Results ==
Rank	Pair	Lane	Name	Country	Time	Time Behind	Notes
1st place, gold medalist(s)	11	i	Ireen Wüst	Netherlands	1:54.80		
2nd place, silver medalist(s)	7	i	Diane Valkenburg	Netherlands	1:56.27	+1.47	
3rd place, bronze medalist(s)	9	o	Jorien Voorhuis	Netherlands	1:57.30	+2.50	
4	7	o	Yekaterina Shikhova	Russia	1:57.78	+2.98	
5	12	i	Christine Nesbitt	Canada	1:57.83	+3.03	
6	10	i	Ida Njåtun	Norway	1:58.52	+3.72	
7	12	o	Brittany Schussler	Canada	1:58.53	+3.73	
8	10	o	Cindy Klassen	Canada	1:58.77	+3.97	
9	8	o	Hege Bøkko	Norway	1:59.22	+4.42	
10	8	i	Yekaterina Lobysheva	Russia	1:59.32	+4.52	
11	2	o	Mari Hemmer	Norway	1:59.71	+4.91	
12	6	i	Miho Takagi	Japan	1:59.73	+4.93	
13	5	i	Monique Angermüller	Germany	1:59.86	+5.06	
14	9	i	Jilleanne Rookard	United States	1:59.92	+5.12	
15	6	o	Masako Hozumi	Japan	2:00.22	+5.42	
16	5	o	Isabell Ost	Germany	2:00.23	+5.43	
17	4	o	Eriko Ishino	Japan	2:00.88	+6.08	
18	3	i	Luiza Złotkowska	Poland	2:01.14	+6.34	
19	3	o	Jennifer Bay	Germany	2:01.38	+6.58	
20	2	i	Natalia Czerwonka	Poland	2:01.86	+7.06	
21	4	i	Yuliya Skokova	Russia	2:01.90	+7.10	
22	1	i	Anna Rokita	Austria	2:02.46	+7.66	
