= Jakko Jan Leeuwangh =

Dutch speed skater

Personal information
- Born: 9 September 1972 (age 53) Alkmaar, Netherlands
- Height: 1.90 m (6 ft 3 in)
- Weight: 91 kg (201 lb)

Sport
- Country: Netherlands
- Sport: Speed skating
Medal record
Men's speed skating
Representing the Netherlands
World Single Distance Championships
Bronze medal – third place	1999 Heerenveen	500 m
Bronze medal – third place	1999 Heerenveen	1000 m
World Junior Championships
Bronze medal – third place	1992 Warsaw	Allround

Jakko Jan Leeuwangh (born 9 September 1972) is a former speed skater from the Netherlands. He finished fourth in the 1998 Olympic 1000 m event. In January 2000 he broke the 1500 m world record in Calgary, Canada, holding the record until it was broken by Lee Kyou-hyuk in March 2001.

== Records ==
=== Personal records ===
Personal records
Men's speed skating
Event	Result	Date	Location	Notes
500 m	35.37	20 February 1999	Calgary	
1000 m	1:09.31	30 January 2000	Calgary	
1500 m	1:45.56	29 January 2000	Calgary	
3000 m	3:49.61	14 August 1999	Calgary	
5000 m	6:46.17	15 August 1999	Calgary	
10000 m	15:13.20	12 November 1990	Inzell	

=== World records ===
Event	Result	Date	Location	Notes
1500 m	1:45.56	29 January 2000	Calgary	World record until 16 March 2001

Source: SpeedSkatingStats.com

== Tournament overview ==
Season	Dutch Championships Allround	Dutch Championships Single Distances	Dutch Championships Sprint	Olympic Games	World Championships Single Distances	World Championships Sprint	World Championships Junior Allround
1990–91		THE HAGUE 20th 5000m 12th 10000m					
1991–92	ALKMAAR 4th 500m 11th 5000m 8th 1500m 12th 10000m 7th overall	HEERENVEEN 10th 500m 8th 1000m 11th 1500m					WARSAW 5th 500m 7th 3000m (bronze) 1500m 8th 5000m (bronze) overall
1992–93	ASSEN (bronze) 500m 14th 5000m 12th 1500m DNQ 10000m 13th overall	DEVENTER DNF 500m 10th 1500m 16th 5000m 12th 10000m	UTRECHT 9th 500m 6th 1000m 8th 500m 5th 1000m 5th overall				
1993–94		HEERENVEEN 6th 500m 4th 1000m 11th 1500m	THE HAGUE 4th 500m (bronze) 1000m 7th 500m 4th 1000m (bronze) overall				
1994–95		THE HAGUE 4th 500m 5th 1000m	ALKMAAR 5th 500m 6th 1000m (silver) 500m 4th 1000m (silver) overall			MILWAUKEE 25th 500m 17th 1000m 28th 500m 16th 1000m 18th overall	
1995–96			ASSEN (bronze) 500m (silver) 1000m (silver) 500m (silver) 1000m (silver) overall		HAMAR 19th 500m 18th 1000m	HEERENVEEN 22nd 500m 21st 1000m 30th 500m 22nd 1000m 20th overall	
1996–97		THE HAGUE (bronze) 500m 4th 1000m	GRONINGEN 5th 500m 5th 1000m 5th 500m (bronze) 1000m 4th overall				
1997–98		HEERENVEEN (bronze) 500m 4th 1000m	GRONINGEN (bronze) 500m 4th 1000m 4th 500m 6th 1000m 4th overall	NAGANO 21st 500m 4th 1000m	CALGARY 13th 500m 6th 1000m	BERLIN 16th 500m (silver) 1000m 18th 500m 5th 1000m 7th overall	
1998–99		GRONINGEN (silver) 500m (gold) 1000m 5th 1500m	GRONINGEN (silver) 500m (bronze) 1000m 4th 500m 4th 1000m (silver) overall		HEERENVEEN (bronze) 500m (bronze) 1000m	CALGARY 4th 500m (silver) 1000m 9th 500m 4th 1000m 4th overall	
1999–2000		DEVENTER (silver) 1500m	UTRECHT (silver) 500m (silver) 1000m (silver) 500m (silver) 1000m (silver) overall		NAGANO 9th 1000m 6th 1500m	SEOUL 9th 500m 4th 1000m 18th 500m 6th 1000m 6th overall	
2000–01		THE HAGUE 5th 500m 6th 1000m 8th 1500m	HEERENVEEN 5th 500m 6th 1000m 5th 500m 6th 1000m 5th overall				
2001–02		GRONINGEN 6th 500m 5th 1000m (silver) 1500m	GRONINGEN 5th 500m 5th 1000m 5th 500m 5th 1000m 5th overall				
