= Roger Schneider =

Swiss speed skater (1983–2020)

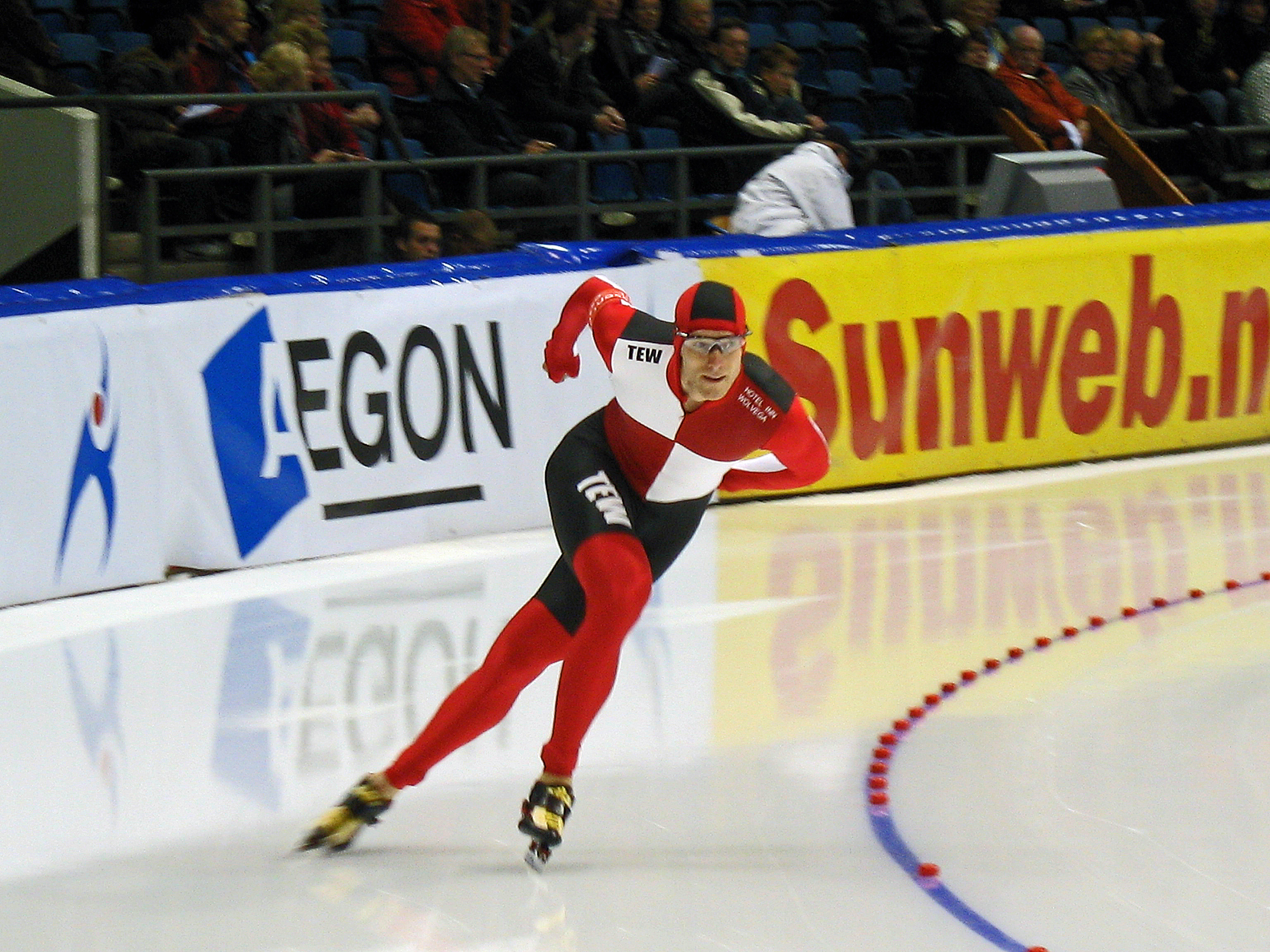
- Roger Schneider 5k World Cup Heerenveen nov 2008

Personal information
- Born: 22 May 1983 Zürich, Switzerland
- Died: 17 January 2020 (aged 36)
- Height: 2.03 m (6 ft 8 in)
- Weight: 100 kg (220 lb)

Sport
- Sport: Speed skating

Roger Schneider (22 May 1983 – 17 January 2020) was a Swiss long track speed skater who participated in international competitions.

== Personal records ==
Personal records
Men's Speed skating
Event	Result	Date	Location	Notes
500 m	38.37	12 January 2008	Kolomna	
1,000 m	1:14.21	28 October 2007	Salt Lake City	
1,500 m	1:48.63	16 November 2007	Calgary	
3,000 m	3:48.75	3 November 2007	Salt Lake City	
5,000 m	6:21.69	10 November 2007	Salt Lake City	
10,000 m	13:16.74	23 November 2008	Moscow	

=== Career highlights ===
European Allround Championships
2008 – Kolomna, 23
National Championships
2006 – Davos, (bronze) 3rd at small allround
2009 - Inzell, (gold) 1st at big allround
