= Tomomi Okazaki =

Japanese speed skater

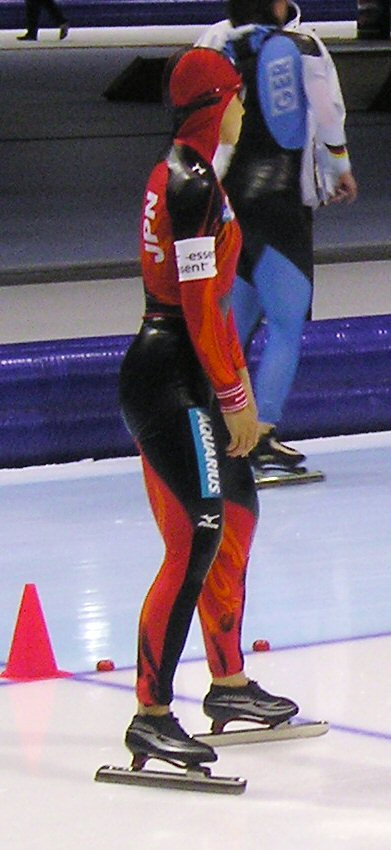

Personal information
- Born: 7 September 1971 (age 54) Kiyosato, Hokkaido, Japan

Sport
- Country: Japan
- Sport: Speed skating
Medal record
Women's speed skating
Olympic Games
Bronze medal – third place	1998 Nagano	500 m
World Championships
Bronze medal – third place	1996 Hamar	500 m
Bronze medal – third place	1998 Calgary	500 m
Bronze medal – third place	1999 Heerenveen	500 m

Tomomi Okazaki (Japanese: 岡崎朋美, born 7 September 1971) is a Japanese speed skater who has competed in five Olympic Games. She won a bronze medal at the 1998 Winter Olympics in Nagano, Japan. Okazaki was the oldest member of the Japanese team at the 2010 Winter Olympics.

== Biography ==
Okazaki, a member of the Fuji speed skating team, has competed in speed skating at five Olympic Games, participating in both 500 meter and 1000 meter events. She first competed in the Winter Olympics in the 1994 Games in Lillehammer, Norway, placing 14th. Four years later, competing in her home country during the 1998 Games in Nagano, she won her only medal, a bronze, when she placed third in the 500 meter event with a time of 38:55. She placed seventh in the 1000 meter race at the same games. She became famous in her native Japan and around the world for her smile after winning the bronze medal. In 2002, she placed 6th in the 500 meter race, and in 2006 placed 16th in the 1000 meter race and a close 4th in the 500 meter raced after coming in third in the first two runs of the competition.

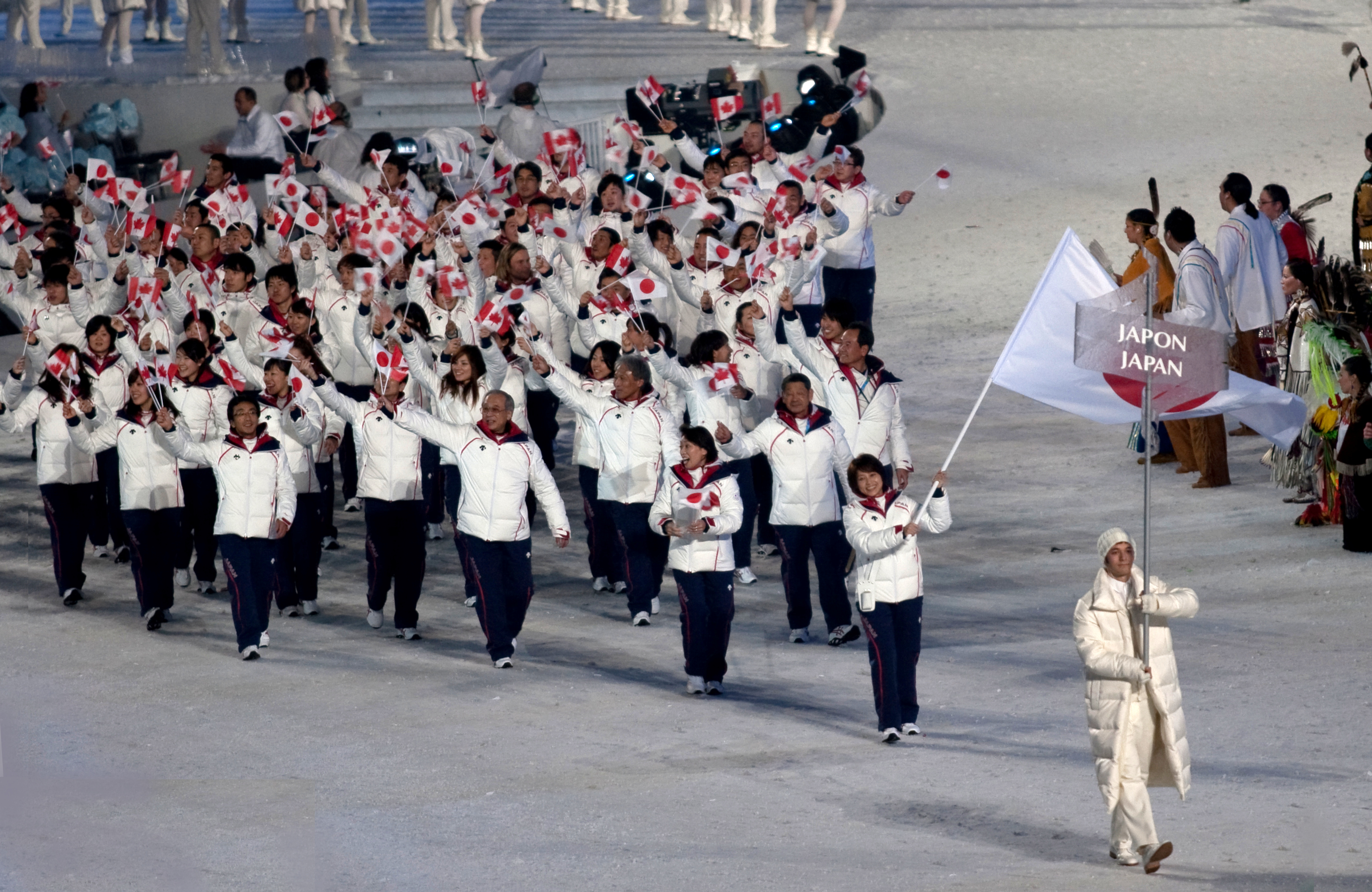
Tomomi was the team's flagbearer during the 2010 Winter Olympics opening ceremony

Okazaki married in late 2007 and started competing again during the 2008–09 speed skating season. She earned a spot on the Japanese team for the 2010 Olympic Games, the first woman from Japan to compete in five Olympic Games. At 38 years old, she was the oldest female member of the Japanese team, and was selected to bear the flag of Japan during the opening ceremony. She was not the first female flag bearer for Japan in the winter games as erroneously reported by a Canadian TV commentator and on Yahoo! Sports (This title goes to Junko Hiramatsu in Squaw Valley in 1960.)

In addition to her Olympic career, Okazaki has skated successfully in a number of world championship events. She has won 11 Speed Skating World Cup races in 500 meter events, and has a personal best time in that distance of 37.73. Her performances at the 1000 meter distance have been less successful.

Olympic Games
Preceded by Joji Kato	Flagbearer for Japan; 2010 Vancouver	Succeeded by Ayumi Ogasawara
