= Ådne Søndrål =

Norwegian speed skater (born 1971)

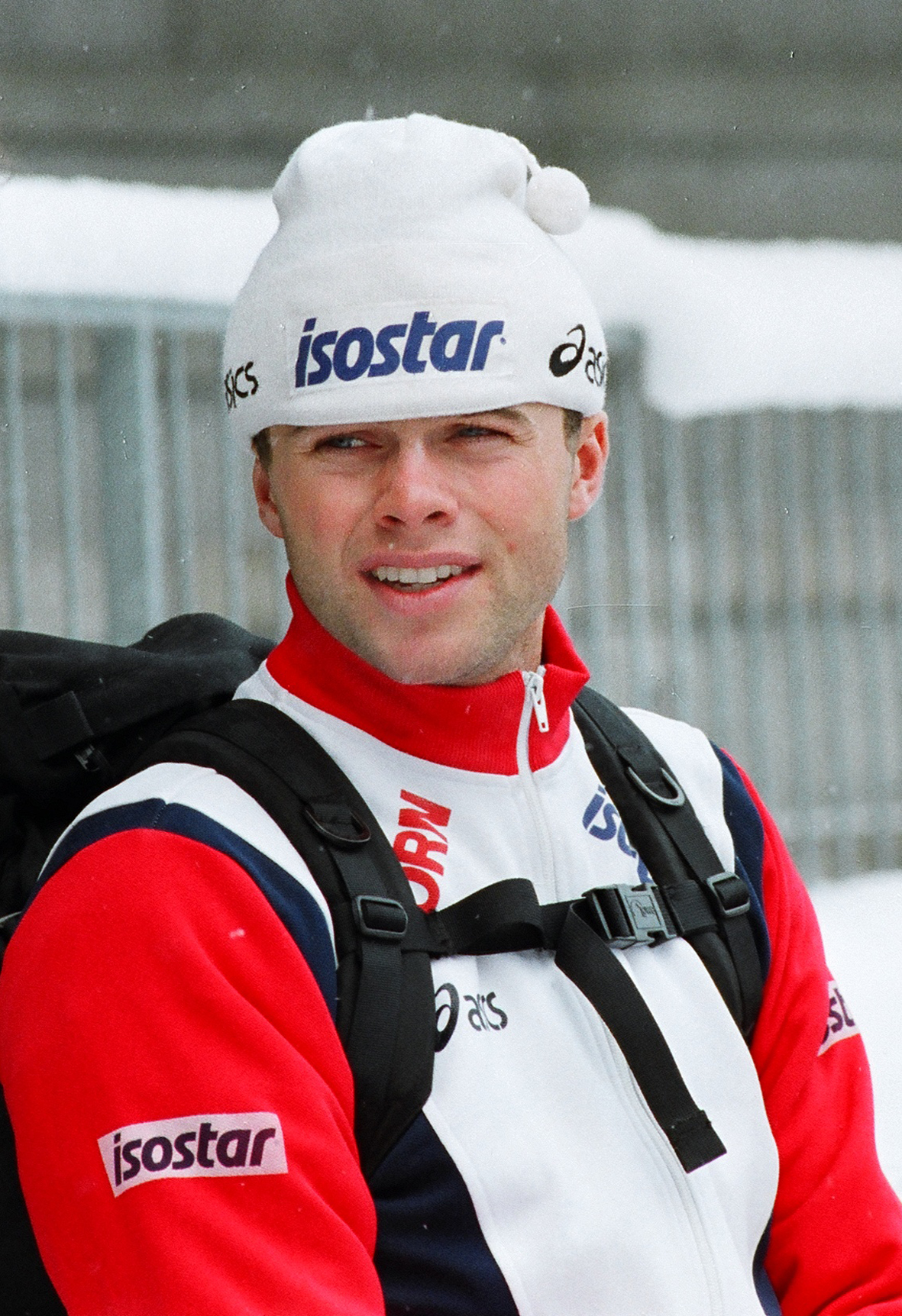

Personal information
- Born: 10 May 1971 (age 55) Notodden, Norway
- Height: 1.80 m (5 ft 11 in)
- Weight: 88 kg (194 lb)

Sport
- Country: Norway
- Sport: Speed skating
- Club: Hol Idrettslag (1980/81–1990/91); Hamar Idrettslag (1991/92–1992/93); Hol Idrettslag (1993/94– )
- Turned pro: 1989
- Retired: 2002
Medal record
Men's speed skating
Representing Norway
Olympic Games
Gold medal – first place	1998 Nagano	1,500 m
Silver medal – second place	1992 Albertville	1,500 m
Bronze medal – third place	2002 Salt Lake City	1,500 m
World Championships
Gold medal – first place	1997 Warszawa	1000 m
Gold medal – first place	1998 Calgary	1500 m
Gold medal – first place	2000 Nagano	1000 m
Gold medal – first place	2001 Salt Lake City	1500 m
Silver medal – second place	1996 Hamar	1000 m
Silver medal – second place	1996 Hamar	1500 m
Silver medal – second place	1997 Warszawa	1500 m
Silver medal – second place	1999 Heerenveen	1500 m
Silver medal – second place	2000 Nagano	1500 m
Silver medal – second place	2001 Salt Lake City	1000 m

Ådne Søndrål (born 10 May 1971) is a former Norwegian speed skater.

Søndrål, representing Hol IL, was one of the best 1500 m skaters through most of the 1990s. He placed 2nd in the 1992 Winter Olympics and 4th in the 1994 Olympics. He finally won Olympic gold when he won 1500 m in the 1998 Winter Olympics in Nagano, setting a new world record: 1:47.87. He was also one of the favourites for a 1000 m medal in 1998, but he got sick before this race and did not start. In the 2002 Winter Olympics he was the big favourite, but he dislocated both his shoulders in falls in the last two weeks before the Olympic races, and he was happy to win a bronze medal. This made his collection of Olympic medals complete - one of each colour, in addition to a 4th position.

He started his career as an allround speed skater, without much success in the international allround championships. From 1996, he specialized in 1000 m and 1500 m, and he placed 2nd on both distances at the first World Single Distance Championships. He also won the 1000 m World Cup this season. In 1999 he tried allround again and he achieved his best result, placing 6th in the World Allround Championships on home ground in Hamar, Norway.

His achievements also include 4 gold and 6 silver medals in the World Single Distance Championships, 30 World Cup wins (1 on the 500 m, 11 on the 1000 m and 18 on the 1500 m) and 4 World Cup titles (on the 1000 m in 1996 and on the 1500 m in 1999, 2000 and 2002), and the Oscar Mathisen Award in 1998. In March 1998 in Calgary, he broke his own 1500 m world record, setting it at 1:46.43. This record stood firm until Jakko Jan Leeuwangh broke it in January 2000.

For many years, his personal trainer was former Norwegian speed skater Tom Erik Oxholm.

At the 2002 Winter Olympics, he was elected by the athletes as an IOC member for a period of 4 years, replacing Johann Olav Koss as one of the athletes representatives.

== Records ==
=== Personal records ===
Personal records
Men's speed skating
Event	Result	Date	Location	Notes
500 m	35.72	2001-01-15	Hamar	
1000 m	1:08.15	2001-12-02	Salt Lake City	
1500 m	1:45.26	2002-02-19	Salt Lake City	
3000 m	3:59.80	1999-10-27	Hamar	
5000 m	6:40.53	1999-02-06	Hamar	
10000 m	14:13.12	1999-02-07	Hamar	

Source: SpeedskatingResults.com

Søndrål has an Adelskalender score of 153.515 points. His highest ranking on the Adelskalender was a 12th place.

=== World records ===
Event	Time	Date	Venue
1500 m	1.47,87	12 February 1998	(Japan) Nagano
1500 m	1.46,43	28 March 1998	(Canada) Calgary

Source: SpeedSkatingStats.com

Awards
Preceded by (Germany) Gunda Niemann	Oscar Mathisen Award; 1998	Succeeded by (Netherlands) Rintje Ritsma
