= Svetlana Zhurova =

Russian speed skater

- Светлана Журова
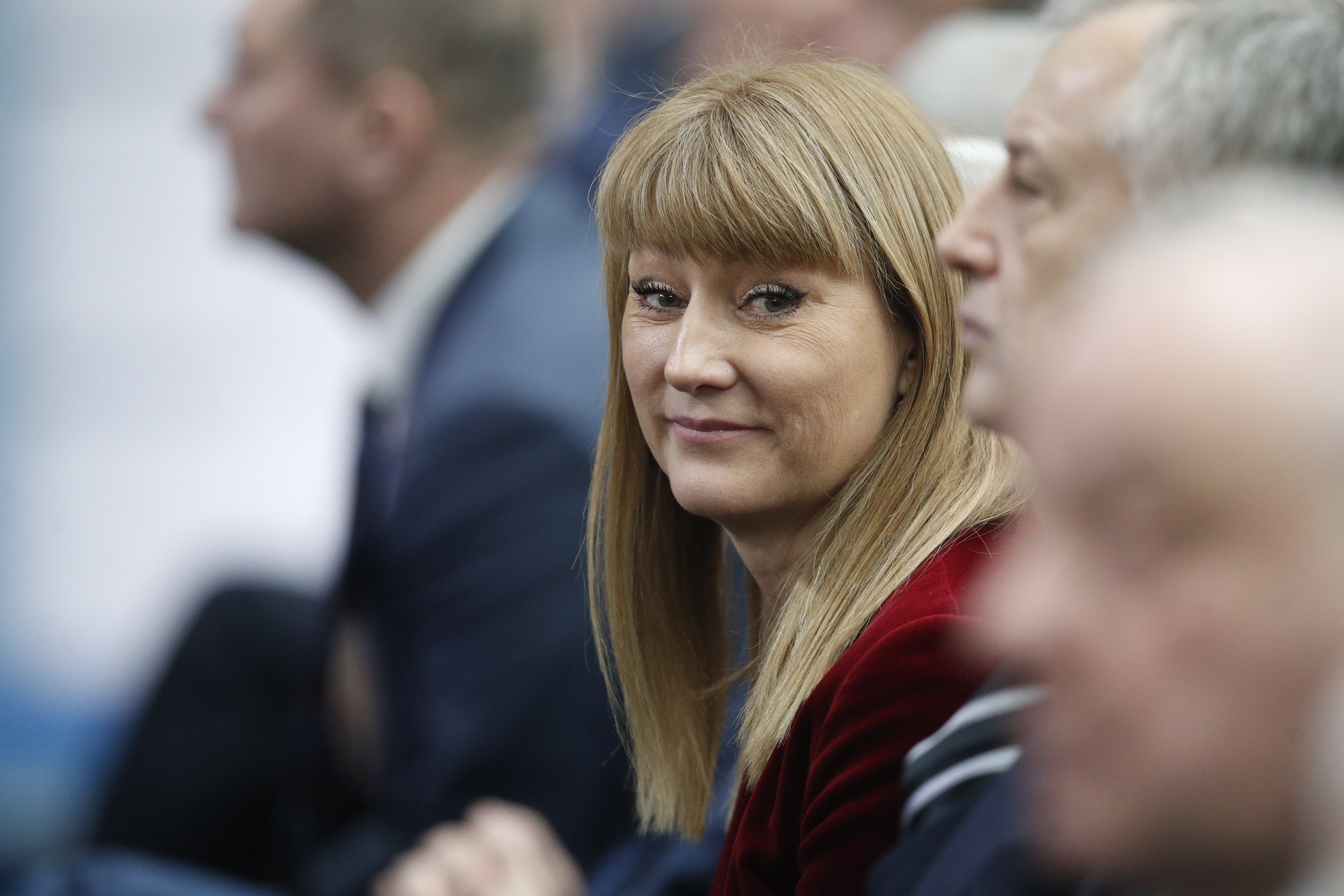
- Zhurova in 2021

Member of the State Duma for Leningrad Oblast
- Incumbent
- Assumed office 12 October 2021
- Preceded by: Vladimir Drachev
- Constituency: Vsevolozhsk (No. 111)

Member of the State Duma (Party List Seat)
- In office 6 March 2013 – 12 October 2021
- Preceded by: Ramazan Abdulatipov
- In office 24 December 2007 – 21 December 2011

Personal details
- Born: 7 January 1972 (age 54) Pavlov-on-Neva, Russian SFSR, USSR
- Party: United Russia
- Spouse: Artemiy Borisovich Chernenko (m. 1999; div. 2013)
- Children: 2 sons (1 deceased)
- Education: Russian State Academy of Physical Education (M.Ed.); RANEPA
- Sports career
- Height: 1.75 m (5 ft 9 in)
- Weight: 64 kg (141 lb)
- Country: Russia
- Sport: Speed skating
- Retired: 2007
Medal record
Olympic Games
Gold medal – first place	2006 Turin	500 m
World Championships
Gold medal – first place	2006 Heerenveen	Sprint
Gold medal – first place	1996 Hamar	500 m
Silver medal – second place	1998 Calgary	500 m
Silver medal – second place	1999 Heerenveen	500 m
Silver medal – second place	2000 Nagano	500 m
Bronze medal – third place	2001 Salt Lake City	500 m

Svetlana Sergeyevna Zhurova (Russian: Светла́на Серге́евна Жу́рова; born 7 January 1972) is a speed skater from Russia and a deputy at the State Duma of the Russian Federation.

== Career ==
Zhurova has been competing internationally since 1989, took part in four Olympics, but did not win her first Olympic medal until her fourth Olympics, winning Olympic gold in Turin in 2006, two years after giving birth to a child. She also became Sprint World Champion in 2006. After her sporting career she became a politician and became Vice Speaker of the fifth State Duma as part of the ruling United Russia party.

== Sanctions ==
On December 9, 2014, Zhurova was sanctioned by the United Kingdom after she voted in favor of a bill making the Republic of Crimea a federal subject of Russia earlier that year. Ten days later, Zhurova was placed on the Canadian sanctions list for the Russo-Ukrainian war.

In 2023, she criticized the Canadian Olympic Committee after its CEO David Shoemaker proposed a requirement that Russian athletes must denounce the Russian invasion of Ukraine before they can compete in Olympic events:

This is not surprising, as the Ukrainian diaspora has a very large influence in Canada. Therefore, Canadians will be the last after Ukraine to recognize Russian athletes at the Olympics. They are asking our athletes to refuse to support their native country, which raised them as athletes. Our state has a very great influence on the development of sports, and in the West there is no such support. They want to destroy the interaction between the state and sports in our country, which our ancestors built over the years.
