= Speed skating at the 1998 Winter Olympics – Men's 5000 metres =

Speed skating at the Olympics

Men's 5000 metres at the XVIII Olympic Winter Games
- Venue: M-Wave
- Dates: 8 February 1998
- Competitors: 32 from 19 nations
- Winning time: 6:22.20

Medalists
1st place, gold medalist(s)		Gianni Romme; Netherlands
2nd place, silver medalist(s)		Rintje Ritsma; Netherlands
3rd place, bronze medalist(s)		Bart Veldkamp; Belgium

The men's 5000 metres in speed skating at the 1998 Winter Olympics took place on 8 February, at the M-Wave arena.

== Records ==
Prior to this competition, the existing world and Olympic records were as follows:

World record	Gianni Romme (NED)	6:30.63	Heerenveen, Netherlands	7 December 1997
Olympic record	Johann Olav Koss (NOR)	6:34.96	Hamar, Norway	13 February 1994

The following new world and olympic records was set during this competition.

Date	Pair	Athlete	Country	Time	OR	WR
8 February	Pair 12	Bart Veldkamp	Belgium	6:28.31	OR	WR
8 February	Pair 13	Rintje Ritsma	Netherlands	6:28.24	OR	WR
8 February	Pair 16	Gianni Romme	Netherlands	6:22.20	OR	WR

== Results ==
Rank	Pair	Lane	Name	Country	Time	Time behind	Notes
1st place, gold medalist(s)	16	i	Gianni Romme	Netherlands	6:22.20	-	(WR)
2nd place, silver medalist(s)	13	o	Rintje Ritsma	Netherlands	6:28.24	+6.04	
3rd place, bronze medalist(s)	12	i	Bart Veldkamp	Belgium	6:28.31	+6.11	
4	15	o	Bob de Jong	Netherlands	6:31.37	+9.17	
5	15	i	Frank Dittrich	Germany	6:32.17	+9.97	
6	14	o	René Taubenrauch	Germany	6:35.21	+13.01	
7	13	i	Keiji Shirahata	Japan	6:36.71	+14.51	
8	16	o	Kjell Storelid	Norway	6:37.12	+14.92	
9	11	o	Roberto Sighel	Italy	6:38.33	+16.13	
10	5	o	Marnix ten Kortenaar	Austria	6:38.35	+16.15	
11	10	o	Lasse Sætre	Norway	6:38.95	+16.75	
12	14	i	Remi Hereide	Norway	6:39.35	+17.15	
13	12	o	Alexander Baumgärtel	Germany	6:39.44	+17.24	
14	9	i	K. C. Boutiette	United States	6:39.67	+17.47	
15	3	i	Vadim Sayutin	Russia	6:39.92	+17.72	
16	10	o	Dave Tamburrino	United States	6:41.19	+18.99	
17	1	i	Takahiro Nozaki	Japan	6:42.30	+20.10	
18	7	o	Paweł Zygmunt	Poland	6:45.59	+23.39	
19	1	i	Cédric Kuentz	France	6:45.90	+23.70	
20	11	i	Andrey Krivosheyev	Russia	6:46.57	+24.37	
21	7	i	Martin Feigenwinter	Switzerland	6:47.08	+24.88	
22	9	i	Yury Kokhanets	Russia	6:47.21	+25.01	
23	6	o	Steven Elm	Canada	6:48.67	+26.47	
24	5	i	Mark Knoll	Canada	6:50.55	+28.35	
25	6	i	Hiroyuki Noake	Japan	6:51.35	+29.15	
26	3	o	Sergey Kaznacheyev	Kazakhstan	6:51.50	+29.30	
27	2	i	Radik Bikchentayev	Kazakhstan	6:52.65	+30.45	
28	4	o	Serhiy Priz	Ukraine	6:54.27	+32.07	
29	8	o	Choi Jae-bong	South Korea	6:54.62	+32.42	
30	8	i	Dezideriu Horvath	Romania	6:57.08	+34.88	
31	2	o	Fausto Marreiros	Portugal	7:01.87	+39.67	
32	4	i	Vitaly Novichenko	Belarus	7:19.76	+57.56	
