= Speed skating at the 1998 Winter Olympics – Men's 10,000 metres =

Speed skating at the Olympics

Men's 10,000 metres at the XVIII Olympic Winter Games
- Venue: M-Wave
- Dates: 17 February 1998
- Competitors: 16 from 9 nations
- Winning time: 13:15.33 WR

Medalists
| 1st place, gold medalist(s) | | Gianni Romme; Netherlands |
| 2nd place, silver medalist(s) | | Bob de Jong; Netherlands |
| 3rd place, bronze medalist(s) | | Rintje Ritsma; Netherlands |

The men's 10,000 metres in speed skating at the 1998 Winter Olympics took place on 17 February, at the M-Wave arena.

== Records ==
Prior to this competition, the existing world and Olympic records were as follows:

| World record | Johann Olav Koss (NOR) | 13:30.55 | Hamar, Norway | 20 February 1994 |
| Olympic record | Johann Olav Koss (NOR) | 13:30.55 | Hamar, Norway | 20 February 1994 |

The following new world record was set during this competition.

| Date | Pair | Athlete | Country | Time | OR | WR |
|---|---|---|---|---|---|---|
| 17 February | Pair 7 | Gianni Romme | Netherlands | 13:15.33 | OR | WR |

== Results ==
| Rank | Pair | Lane | Name | Country | Time | Time Behind | Notes |
|---|---|---|---|---|---|---|---|
| 1st place, gold medalist(s) | 7 | o | Gianni Romme | Netherlands | 13:15.33 | - | (WR) |
| 2nd place, silver medalist(s) | 7 | i | Bob de Jong | Netherlands | 13:25.76 | +10.43 | |
| 3rd place, bronze medalist(s) | 8 | i | Rintje Ritsma | Netherlands | 13:28.19 | +12.86 | |
| 4 | 8 | o | Bart Veldkamp | Belgium | 13:29.69 | +14.36 | |
| 5 | 6 | o | Kjell Storelid | Norway | 13:35.95 | +20.62 | |
| 6 | 6 | i | Frank Dittrich | Germany | 13:36.58 | +21.25 | |
| 7 | 3 | o | Lasse Sætre | Norway | 13:42.94 | +27.61 | |
| 8 | 1 | o | K. C. Boutiette | United States | 13:44.03 | +28.70 | |
| 9 | 4 | i | Roberto Sighel | Italy | 13:46.85 | +31.52 | |
| 10 | 2 | o | Alexander Baumgärtel | Germany | 13:48.44 | +33.11 | |
| 11 | 5 | i | René Taubenrauch | Germany | 13:52.10 | +36.77 | |
| 12 | 3 | i | Marnix ten Kortenaar | Austria | 13:52.30 | +36.97 | |
| 13 | 1 | i | Vadim Sayutin | Russia | 13:54.57 | +39.24 | |
| 14 | 5 | o | Keiji Shirahata | Japan | 13:57.45 | +42.12 | |
| 15 | 4 | o | Remi Hereide | Norway | 14:09.90 | +54.57 | |
| 16 | 2 | i | Dave Tamburrino | United States | 14:12.00 | +56.67 | |
