= Speed skating at the 1998 Winter Olympics =

Speed skating at the XVIII Olympic Winter Games
- Venue: M-Wave
- Dates: 8–20 February 1998
- No. of events: 10
- Competitors: 169 from 25 nations

Speed skating at the 1998 Winter Olympics, was held from 8 to 20 February. Ten events were contested at M-Wave. The Netherlands dominated the Nagano speed skating events, winning five gold medals and eleven medals overall, their highest total in any Winter games up until that point. Bart Veldkamp's bronze medal was the first in speed skating for Belgium, and the first at the Winter Games for the country in 50 years. Lyudmila Prokasheva's bronze medal for Kazakhstan was that country's first in the sport as well, and Prokasheva became the first woman from Kazakhstan to earn an Olympic medal.

Gianni Romme and Marianne Timmer led the individual medal tables, with two gold each.

== Medal summary ==
=== Medal table ===
Rank	Nation	Gold	Silver	Bronze	Total
1	Netherlands	5	4	2	11
2	Germany	2	3	1	6
3	Canada	1	2	2	5
4	Japan	1	0	2	3
5	Norway	1	0	0	1
6	United States	0	1	1	2
7	Belgium	0	0	1	1
7	Kazakhstan	0	0	1	1
Totals (8 entries)		10	10	10	30

=== Men's events ===
Event	Gold		Silver		Bronze	
500 metres	Hiroyasu Shimizu; Japan	1:11.35	Jeremy Wotherspoon; Canada	1:11.84	Kevin Overland; Canada	1:11.86
1000 metres	Ids Postma; Netherlands	1:10.64 (OR)	Jan Bos; Netherlands	1:10.71	Hiroyasu Shimizu; Japan	1:11.00
1500 metres	Ådne Søndrål; Norway	1:47.87; WR	Ids Postma; Netherlands	1:48.13	Rintje Ritsma; Netherlands	1:48.52
5000 metres	Gianni Romme; Netherlands	6:22.20; WR	Rintje Ritsma; Netherlands	6:28.24	Bart Veldkamp; Belgium	6:28.31
10,000 metres	Gianni Romme; Netherlands	13:15.33; WR	Bob de Jong; Netherlands	13:25.76	Rintje Ritsma; Netherlands	13:28.19

=== Women's events ===
Event	Gold		Silver		Bronze	
500 metres	Catriona Le May Doan; Canada	1:16.60	Susan Auch; Canada	1:16.93	Tomomi Okazaki; Japan	1:17.10
1000 metres	Marianne Timmer; Netherlands	1:16.51 (OR)	Chris Witty; United States	1:16.79	Catriona Le May Doan; Canada	1:17.37
1500 metres	Marianne Timmer; Netherlands	1:57.58 WR	Gunda Niemann-Stirnemann; Germany	1:58.66	Chris Witty; United States	1:58.97
3000 metres	Gunda Niemann-Stirnemann; Germany	4:07.29 (OR)	Claudia Pechstein; Germany	4:08.47	Anni Friesinger-Postma; Germany	4:09.44
5000 metres	Claudia Pechstein; Germany	6:59.61 WR	Gunda Niemann-Stirnemann; Germany	6:59.65	Lyudmila Prokasheva; Kazakhstan	7:11.14

== Records ==
Five world records and twelve Olympic records were set in Nagano.

Event	Date	Team	Time	OR	WR
Men's 500 metres	9 February	Hiroyasu Shimizu (JPN)	35.76	OR	
Men's 500 metres	11 February	Hiroyasu Shimizu (JPN)	35.59	OR	
Men's 1000 metres	15 February	Ids Postma (NED)	1:10.64	OR	
Men's 1500 metres	12 February	Ådne Søndrål (NOR)	1:47.87	OR	WR
Men's 5000 metres	8 February	Gianni Romme (NED)	6:22.20	OR	WR
Men's 10000 metres	17 February	Gianni Romme (NED)	13:15.33	OR	WR
Women's 500 metres	13 February	Catriona Le May Doan (CAN)	38.39	OR	
Women's 500 metres	14 February	Catriona Le May Doan (CAN)	38.21	OR	
Women's 1000 metres	19 February	Marianne Timmer (NED)	1:16.51	OR	
Women's 1500 metres	16 February	Marianne Timmer (NED)	1:57.58	OR	WR
Women's 3000 metres	11 February	Gunda Niemann-Stirnemann (GER)	4:07.29	OR	
Women's 5000 metres	20 February	Claudia Pechstein (GER)	6:59.61	OR	WR

== Participating NOCs ==
Twenty-five nations competed in the speed skating events at Nagano. New Zealand and Portugal made their Olympic speed skating debuts.

- Austria (4)
- Belarus (4)
- Belgium (1)
- Canada (17)
- China (12)
- Finland (1)
- France (1)
- Germany (13)
- Hungary (2)
- Italy (4)
- Japan (17)
- Kazakhstan (7)
- South Korea (13)
- Latvia (1)
- Netherlands (16)
- Norway (10)
- New Zealand (1)
- Poland (3)
- Portugal (1)
- North Korea (2)
- Romania (2)
- Russia (18)
- Switzerland (1)
- Ukraine (4)
- United States (14)
