= Germany at the 1998 Winter Olympics =

- IOC code: GER
- NOC: German Olympic Sports Confederation
- Website: www.dosb.de (in German, English, and French)

in Nagano
- Competitors: 125 (78 men, 47 women) in 14 sports
- Flag bearer: Jochen Behle (cross-country skiing)
- Medals Ranked 1st: Gold 12 Silver 9 Bronze 8 Total 29

Winter Olympics appearances (overview)
- 1928; 1932; 1936; 1948; 1952; 1956–1988; 1992; 1994; 1998; 2002; 2006; 2010; 2014; 2018; 2022; 2026

Other related appearances
- United Team of Germany (1956–1964); East Germany (1968–1988); West Germany (1968–1988)

Germany competed at the 1998 Winter Olympics in Nagano, Japan.

== Medalists ==
Medal	Name	Sport	Event	Date
Gold	Georg Hackl	Luge	Men's singles	9 February
Gold	Gunda Niemann-Stirnemann	Speed skating	Women's 3000 metres	11 February
Gold	Silke Kraushaar	Luge	Women's singles	11 February
Gold	Nicola Thost	Snowboarding	Women's halfpipe	12 February
Gold	Stefan Krauße; Jan Behrendt	Luge	Doubles	13 February
Gold	Katja Seizinger	Alpine skiing	Women's downhill	16 February
Gold	Katja Seizinger	Alpine skiing	Women's combined	17 February
Gold	Hilde Gerg	Alpine skiing	Women's slalom	19 February
Gold	Uschi Disl; Martina Zellner; Katrin Apel; Petra Behle	Biathlon	Women's relay	19 February
Gold	Claudia Pechstein	Speed skating	Women's 5000 metres	20 February
Gold	Ricco Groß; Peter Sendel; Sven Fischer; Frank Luck	Biathlon	Men's relay	21 February
Gold	Christoph Langen; Markus Zimmermann; Marco Jakobs; Olaf Hampel	Bobsleigh	Four-man	21 February
Silver	Heidi Renoth	Snowboarding	Women's giant slalom	10 February
Silver	Tatjana Mittermayer	Freestyle skiing	Women's moguls	11 February
Silver	Claudia Pechstein	Speed skating	Women's 3000 metres	11 February
Silver	Barbara Niedernhuber	Luge	Women's singles	11 February
Silver	Uschi Disl	Biathlon	Women's sprint	15 February
Silver	Gunda Niemann-Stirnemann	Speed skating	Women's 1500 metres	16 February
Silver	Sven Hannawald; Martin Schmitt; Hansjörg Jäkle; Dieter Thoma	Ski jumping	Large hill team	17 February
Silver	Martina Ertl	Alpine skiing	Women's combined	17 February
Silver	Gunda Niemann-Stirnemann	Speed skating	Women's 5000 metres	20 February
Bronze	Uschi Disl	Biathlon	Women's individual	9 February
Bronze	Jens Müller	Luge	Men's singles	9 February
Bronze	Mandy Wötzel; Ingo Steuer	Figure skating	Pairs	10 February
Bronze	Anni Friesinger	Speed skating	Women's 3000 metres	11 February
Bronze	Katrin Apel	Biathlon	Women's sprint	15 February
Bronze	Christoph Langen; Markus Zimmermann	Bobsleigh	Two-man	15 February
Bronze	Hilde Gerg	Alpine skiing	Women's combined	17 February
Bronze	Katja Seizinger	Alpine skiing	Women's giant slalom	20 February

== Competitors ==
The following is the list of number of competitors in the Games.

Sport	Men	Women	Total
Alpine skiing	1	6	7
Biathlon	6	5	11
Bobsleigh	9	–	9
Cross-country skiing	5	5	10
Curling	5	5	10
Figure skating	3	3	6
Freestyle skiing	0	3	3
Ice hockey	23	0	23
Luge	7	3	10
Nordic combined	5	–	5
Short track speed skating	1	4	5
Ski jumping	4	–	4
Snowboarding	3	5	8
Speed skating	6	8	14
Total	78	47	125

== Alpine skiing ==
Men

Athlete	Event	Race 1	Race 2	Total	
Athlete	Event	Time	Time	Time	Rank
Markus Eberle	Giant slalom	1:24.01	DNF	DNF	–
Markus Eberle	Slalom	DNF	–	DNF	–

Women

Athlete	Event	Race 1	Race 2	Total	
Athlete	Event	Time	Time	Time	Rank
Regina Häusl	Downhill			DNF	–
Hilde Gerg	Downhill			1:29.96	9
Katrin Gutensohn	Downhill			1:29.96	9
Katja Seizinger	Downhill			1:29.89	1st place, gold medalist(s)
Hilde Gerg	Super-G			1:18.59	10
Martina Ertl	Super-G			1:18.46	7
Katja Seizinger	Super-G			1:18.44	6
Regina Häusl	Super-G			1:18.27	4
Regina Häusl	Giant slalom	1:26.37	1:38.20	3:04.57	30
Hilde Gerg	Giant slalom	1:21.45	1:34.44	2:55.89	13
Martina Ertl	Giant slalom	1:20.38	1:32.34	2:52.72	4
Katja Seizinger	Giant slalom	1:20.19	1:32.42	2:52.61	3rd place, bronze medalist(s)
Monika Bergmann	Slalom	47.78	47.21	1:34.99	9
Martina Ertl	Slalom	46.22	46.69	1:32.91	4
Hilde Gerg	Slalom	45.89	46.51	1:32.40	1st place, gold medalist(s)

Women's combined

Athlete	Downhill	Slalom		Total	
Athlete	Time	Time 1	Time 2	Total time	Rank
Monika Bergmann	1:33.35	37.41	35.08	2:45.84	12
Hilde Gerg	1:29.92	36.52	35.06	2:41.50	3rd place, bronze medalist(s)
Martina Ertl	1:29.76	36.45	34.71	2:40.92	2nd place, silver medalist(s)
Katja Seizinger	1:28.52	37.14	35.08	2:40.74	1st place, gold medalist(s)

== Biathlon ==
Men

Event	Athlete	Misses ^{1}	Time	Rank
10 km Sprint	Carsten Heymann	2	30:09.6	34
10 km Sprint	Sven Fischer	2	29:47.1	29
10 km Sprint	Ricco Groß	1	29:13.9	17
10 km Sprint	Frank Luck	1	28:40.3	7

Event	Athlete	Time	Misses	Adjusted time ^{2}	Rank
20 km	Jan Wüstenfeld	57:07.9	4	1'01:07.9	32
20 km	Sven Fischer	56:26.1	3	59:26.1	16
20 km	Peter Sendel	57:30.3	1	58:30.3	8
20 km	Ricco Groß	57:15.4	1	58:15.4	6

Men's 4 × 7.5 km relay

Athletes	Race		
Athletes	Misses ^{1}	Time	Rank
Ricco Groß; Peter Sendel; Sven Fischer; Frank Luck	0	1'21:36.2	1st place, gold medalist(s)

Women

Event	Athlete	Misses ^{1}	Time	Rank
7.5 km Sprint	Martina Zellner	2	25:09.8	30
7.5 km Sprint	Petra Behle	2	24:09.9	16
7.5 km Sprint	Katrin Apel	1	23:32.4	3rd place, bronze medalist(s)
7.5 km Sprint	Uschi Disl	1	23:08.7	2nd place, silver medalist(s)

Event	Athlete	Time	Misses	Adjusted time ^{2}	Rank
15 km	Katja Beer	57:26.4	4	1'01:26.4	39
15 km	Petra Behle	58:29.7	1	59:29.7	27
15 km	Martina Zellner	52:46.3	4	56:46.3	10
15 km	Uschi Disl	54:17.9	1	55:17.9	3rd place, bronze medalist(s)

Women's 4 × 7.5 km relay

Athletes	Race		
Athletes	Misses ^{1}	Time	Rank
Uschi Disl; Martina Zellner; Katrin Apel; Petra Behle	0	1'40:13.6	1st place, gold medalist(s)

^{1} A penalty loop of 150 metres had to be skied per missed target.
^{2} One minute added per missed target.

== Bobsleigh ==
Sled	Athletes	Event	Run 1		Run 2		Run 3		Run 4		Total	
Sled	Athletes	Event	Time	Rank	Time	Rank	Time	Rank	Time	Rank	Time	Rank
GER-1	Christoph Langen; Markus Zimmermann	Two-man	54.82	7	54.62	6	54.11	1	54.34	3	3:37.89	3rd place, bronze medalist(s)
GER-2	Dirk Wiese; Marco Jakobs	Two-man	54.83	8	54.66	8	54.63	11	54.76	13	3:38.88	11

Sled	Athletes	Event	Run 1		Run 2		Run 3		Total	
Sled	Athletes	Event	Time	Rank	Time	Rank	Time	Rank	Time	Rank
GER-1	Harald Czudaj; Torsten Voss; Steffen Görmer; Alexander Szelig	Four-man	53.12	7	53.50	7	53.70	2	2:40.32	8
GER-2	Christoph Langen; Markus Zimmermann; Marco Jakobs; Olaf Hampel	Four-man	52.70	1	52.90	1	53.81	8	2:39.41	1st place, gold medalist(s)

== Cross-country skiing ==
Men

Event	Athlete	Race	
Event	Athlete	Time	Rank
10 km C	Jochen Behle	29:55.9	40
10 km C	René Sommerfeldt	29:52.5	38
10 km C	Johann Mühlegg	29:12.3	27
10 km C	Andreas Schlütter	28:48.0	16
15 km pursuit^{1} F	René Sommerfeldt	43:49.5	29
15 km pursuit^{1} F	Johann Mühlegg	41:48.3	17
15 km pursuit^{1} F	Andreas Schlütter	41:08.3	12
30 km C	Jochen Behle	DNF	–
30 km C	Torald Rein	1'49:06.7	57
30 km C	Andreas Schlütter	1'40:27.1	21
50 km F	Andreas Schlütter	2'17:52.1	36
50 km F	René Sommerfeldt	2'16:19.9	26
50 km F	Johann Mühlegg	2'07:25.3	7

^{1} Starting delay based on 10 km results.
C = Classical style, F = Freestyle

Men's 4 × 10 km relay

Athletes	Race	
Athletes	Time	Rank
Andreas Schlütter; Jochen Behle; René Sommerfeldt; Johann Mühlegg	1'43:16.1	8

Women

Event	Athlete	Race	
Event	Athlete	Time	Rank
5 km C	Sigrid Wille	19:15.6	38
5 km C	Anke Reschwamm-Schulze	19:14.7	37
5 km C	Constanze Blum	19:02.4	30
5 km C	Kati Wilhelm	18:56.9	26
10 km pursuit^{2} F	Sigrid Wille	34:15.1	54
10 km pursuit^{2} F	Kati Wilhelm	31:54.0	32
10 km pursuit^{2} F	Anke Reschwamm-Schulze	31:53.4	31
10 km pursuit^{2} F	Constanze Blum	31:28.5	26
15 km C	Anke Reschwamm-Schulze	51:54.0	38
15 km C	Manuela Henkel	51:53.4	36
15 km C	Sigrid Wille	51:19.3	28
15 km C	Constanze Blum	50:30.3	21
30 km F	Manuela Henkel	DNF	–
30 km F	Constanze Blum	1'31:52.9	31
30 km F	Anke Reschwamm-Schulze	1'30:54.6	26
30 km F	Kati Wilhelm	1'28:27.7	16

^{2} Starting delay based on 5 km results.
C = Classical style, F = Freestyle

Women's 4 × 5 km relay

Athletes	Race	
Athletes	Time	Rank
Kati Wilhelm; Manuela Henkel; Constanze Blum; Anke Reschwamm-Schulze	56:55.4	5

== Curling ==
=== Men's tournament ===
==== Group stage ====
Top four teams advanced to semi-finals.

Country	Skip	W	L
Canada	Mike Harris	6	1
Norway	Eigil Ramsfjell	5	2
Switzerland	Patrick Hürlimann	5	2
United States	Tim Somerville	3	4
Japan	Makoto Tsuruga	3	4
Sweden	Peja Lindholm	3	4
Great Britain	Douglas Dryburgh	2	5
Germany 8th	Andy Kapp	1	6

Team 1	Score	Team 2
Germany	4–7	Switzerland
Germany	5–7	Norway
Germany	6–7	Sweden
Germany	6–10	Canada
United States	8–5	Germany
United Kingdom	4–7	Germany
Japan	7–5	Germany

Contestants

Skip	Third	Second	Lead	Alternate
Andy Kapp	Uli Kapp	Michael Schäffer	Holger Höhne	Oliver Axnick

=== Women's tournament ===
==== Group stage ====
Top four teams advanced to semi-finals.

Country	Skip	W	L
Canada	Sandra Schmirler	6	1
Sweden	Elisabet Gustafson	6	1
Denmark	Helena Blach Lavrsen	5	2
Great Britain	Kirsty Hay	4	3
Japan	Mayumi Ohkutsu	2	5
Norway	Dordi Nordby	2	5
United States	Lisa Schoeneberg	2	5
Germany 8th	Andrea Schöpp	1	6

Team 1	Score	Team 2
Germany	5–6	Denmark
Germany	2–9	Japan
Germany	5–8	United States
Norway	6–7	Germany
Germany	3–8	Sweden
United Kingdom	6–5	Germany
Canada	8–5	Germany

Contestants

Skip	Third	Second	Lead	Alternate
Andrea Schöpp	Monika Wagner	Natalie Nessler	Heike Wieländer	Carina Meidele

== Figure skating ==
Pairs

Athletes	SP	FS	TFP	Rank
Peggy Schwarz; Mirko Mueller	9	8	12.5	9
Mandy Wötzel; Ingo Steuer	2	3	4.0	3rd place, bronze medalist(s)

Ice Dancing

Athletes	CD1	CD2	OD	FD	TFP	Rank
Kati Winkler; René Lohse	11	11	9	10	19.8	10

== Freestyle skiing ==
Women

Athlete	Event	Qualification			Final		
Athlete	Event	Time	Points	Rank	Time	Points	Rank
Gabriele Rauscher	Moguls	35.20	22.11	12 Q	34.13	23.59	11
Sandra Schmitt	Moguls	33.92	22.63	6 Q	33.50	23.67	9
Tatjana Mittermayer	Moguls	34.69	23.07	3 Q	33.50	24.62	2nd place, silver medalist(s)

== Ice hockey ==
=== Men's tournament ===
==== Preliminary round ====
Top team (shaded) advanced to the first round.

Team	GP	W	L	T	GF	GA	GD	Pts
Belarus	3	2	0	1	14	4	+10	5
Germany	3	2	1	0	7	9	-2	4
France	3	1	2	0	5	8	-3	2
Japan	3	0	2	1	5	10	-5	1

All times are local (UTC-7).

7 February 1998	Germany	3 – 1 (0-0, 1-0, 2-1)	Japan	The Big Hat/ Aqua Wing Arena, Nagano, Japan; Attendance: 9,861

9 February 1998	Germany	2 – 8 (0-2, 2-3, 0-3)	Belarus	The Big Hat/ Aqua Wing Arena, Nagano, Japan; Attendance: 8,063

10 February 1998	France	0 – 2 (0-0, 0-1, 0-1)	Germany	The Big Hat/ Aqua Wing Arena, Nagano, Japan; Attendance: 3,916

==== Consolation round ====
All times are local (UTC-7).

12 February 1998	Germany 9th	4 – 2 (0-1, 1-1, 3-0)	Slovakia	The Big Hat/ Aqua Wing Arena, Nagano, Japan; Attendance: 8,670

- Team roster

- Olaf Kölzig
- Josef Heiß
- Klaus Merk
- Mirko Lüdemann
- Erich Goldmann
- Uwe Krupp
- Markus Wieland
- Daniel Kunce
- Brad Bergen
- Jochen Molling
- Lars Brüggemann
- Peter Draisaitl
- Jan Benda
- Mark MacKay
- Reemt Pyka
- Jochen Hecht
- Benoît Doucet
- Stefan Ustorf
- Thomas Brandl
- Andreas Lupzig
- Dieter Hegen
- Jürgen Rumrich
- Marco Sturm

- Head coach: George Kingston

== Luge ==
Men

Athlete	Run 1		Run 2		Run 3		Run 4		Total	
Athlete	Time	Rank	Time	Rank	Time	Rank	Time	Rank	Time	Rank
Karsten Albert	50.353	12	50.172	13	50.080	11	50.499	17	3:21.104	12
Jens Müller	49.954	4	49.700	3	49.729	2	49.710	2	3:19.093	3rd place, bronze medalist(s)
Georg Hackl	49.619	1	49.573	1	49.614	1	49.630	1	3:18.436	1st place, gold medalist(s)

(Men's) Doubles

Athletes	Run 1		Run 2		Total	
Athletes	Time	Rank	Time	Rank	Time	Rank
Stefan Krauße; Jan Behrendt	50.592	1	50.513	3	1:41.105	1st place, gold medalist(s)
Steffen Skel; Steffen Wöller	51.408	10	50.816	6	1:42.224	8

Women

Athlete	Run 1		Run 2		Run 3		Run 4		Total	
Athlete	Time	Rank	Time	Rank	Time	Rank	Time	Rank	Time	Rank
Susi Erdmann	51.475	4	51.348	5	50.895	3	50.731	5	3:24.449	4
Barbara Niedernhuber	51.216	2	51.103	1	50.837	2	50.625	3	3:23.781	2nd place, silver medalist(s)
Silke Kraushaar	51.197	1	51.178	2	50.787	1	50.617	2	3:23.779	1st place, gold medalist(s)

== Nordic combined ==
Men's individual

Events:

- normal hill ski jumping
- 15 km cross-country skiing (Start delay, based on ski jumping results.)

Athlete	Event	Ski Jumping		Cross-country time	Total rank
Athlete	Event	Points	Rank	Cross-country time	Total rank
Matthias Looß	Individual	187.0	41	46:54.2	32
Josef Buchner	Individual	203.0	26	DNF	–
Ronny Ackermann	Individual	209.5	18	43:52.9	12
Jens Deimel	Individual	221.0	10	43:56.3	13

Men's team

Four participants per team.

Events:

- normal hill ski jumping
- 5 km cross-country skiing (Start delay, based on ski jumping results.)

Athletes	Ski jumping		Cross-country time	Total rank
Athletes	Points	Rank	Cross-country time	Total rank
Matthias Looß; Ronny Ackermann; Thorsten Schmitt; Jens Deimel	861.0	7	56:22.0	6

== Short track speed skating ==
Men

Athlete	Event	Round one		Quarter finals		Semi finals		Finals	
Athlete	Event	Time	Rank	Time	Rank	Time	Rank	Time	Final rank
Arian Nachbar	500 m	44.882	3	did not advance					
Arian Nachbar	1000 m	1:32.493	3	did not advance					

Women

Athlete	Event	Round one		Quarter finals		Semi finals		Finals	
Athlete	Event	Time	Rank	Time	Rank	Time	Rank	Time	Final rank
Yvonne Kunze	500 m	46.887	3	did not advance					
Susanne Busch	500 m	1:30.607	4	did not advance					
Susanne Busch	1000 m	1:38.379	3	did not advance					
Yvonne Kunze	1000 m	1:44.870	3	did not advance					
Susanne Busch; Anne Eckner; Yvonne Kunze; Katrin Weber	3000 m relay					4:38.776	4 QB	4:37.110	8

== Ski jumping ==
Athlete	Event	Jump 1			Jump 2		Total	
Athlete	Event	Distance	Points	Rank	Distance	Points	Points	Rank
Hansjörg Jäkle	Normal hill	82.0	99.5	19 Q	82.5	101.0	200.5	17
Martin Schmitt	Normal hill	82.0	100.0	18 Q	82.0	99.5	199.5	19
Sven Hannawald	Normal hill	83.5	103.0	13 Q	84.0	104.5	207.5	14
Dieter Thoma	Normal hill	84.5	106.0	12 Q	83.0	102.5	208.5	13
Hansjörg Jäkle	Large hill	92.0	61.1	57	did not advance			
Sven Hannawald	Large hill	100.0	78.0	48	did not advance			
Dieter Thoma	Large hill	114.0	105.2	22 Q	128.0	130.4	235.6	12
Martin Schmitt	Large hill	118.5	112.3	11 Q	123.0	121.4	233.7	14

Men's team large hill

Athletes	Result	
Athletes	Points ^{1}	Rank
Sven Hannawald; Martin Schmitt; Hansjörg Jäkle; Dieter Thoma	897.4	2nd place, silver medalist(s)

^{1} Four teams members performed two jumps each.

== Snowboarding ==
Men's giant slalom

Athlete	Race 1	Race 2	Total	
Athlete	Time	Time	Time	Rank
Bernd Kroschewski	1:03.53	DSQ	DSQ	–
Dieter Moherndl	1:03.03	1:07.00	2:10.03	14

Men's halfpipe

Athlete	Qualifying round 1		Qualifying round 2		Final	
Athlete	Points	Rank	Points	Rank	Points	Rank
Xaver Hoffmann	28.3	32	38.2	9	did not advance	

Women's giant slalom

Athlete	Race 1	Race 2	Total	
Athlete	Time	Time	Time	Rank
Burgl Heckmair	DNF	–	DNF	–
Sandra Farmand	1:14.39	1:08.71	2:23.10	9
Heidi Renoth	1:11.92	1:07.25	2:19.17	2nd place, silver medalist(s)

Women's halfpipe

Athlete	Qualifying round 1		Qualifying round 2		Final	
Athlete	Points	Rank	Points	Rank	Points	Rank
Sandra Farmand	22.1	25	DNF	–	did not advance	
Sabine Wehr-Hasler	29.5	15	30.5	11	did not advance	
Nicola Thost	30.6	13	37.4	1 QF	74.6	1st place, gold medalist(s)

== Speed skating ==
Men

Event	Athlete	Race 1		Race 2		Total	
Event	Athlete	Time	Rank	Time	Rank	Time	Rank
500 m	Peter Adeberg	36.92	31	DNF	–	DNF	–
500 m	Christian Breuer	36.78	26	36.41	15	73.19	19
500 m	Michael Künzel	36.56	15	36.19	8	72.75	11
1000 m	Christian Breuer					1:12.33	16
1000 m	Peter Adeberg					1:11.90	9
1500 m	René Taubenrauch					1:54.91	38
1500 m	Frank Dittrich					1:53.64	33
1500 m	Peter Adeberg					1:51.50	13
1500 m	Christian Breuer					1:50.96	9
5000 m	Alexander Baumgärtel					6:39.44	13
5000 m	René Taubenrauch					6:35.21	6
5000 m	Frank Dittrich					6:32.17	5
10,000 m	René Taubenrauch					13:52.10	11
10,000 m	Alexander Baumgärtel					13:48.44	10
10,000 m	Frank Dittrich					13:36.58	6

Women

Event	Athlete	Race 1		Race 2		Total	
Event	Athlete	Time	Rank	Time	Rank	Time	Rank
500 m	Anke Baier-Loef	39.73	16	39.75	16	79.48	15
500 m	Sabine Völker	39.19	10	39.00	6	78.19	7
500 m	Monique Garbrecht	39.11	7	39.34	10	78.45	8
500 m	Franziska Schenk	38.88	5	38.57	4	77.45	4
1000 m	Franziska Schenk					DNF	–
1000 m	Anke Baier-Loef					1:19.42	16
1000 m	Monique Garbrecht					1:18.76	10
1000 m	Sabine Völker					1:17.54	4
1500 m	Claudia Pechstein					1:59.46	7
1500 m	Anni Friesinger					1:59.20	5
1500 m	Gunda Niemann					1:58.66	2nd place, silver medalist(s)
3000 m	Anni Friesinger					4:09.44	3rd place, bronze medalist(s)
3000 m	Claudia Pechstein					4:08.47	2nd place, silver medalist(s)
3000 m	Gunda Niemann					4:07.29 OR	1st place, gold medalist(s)
5000 m	Heike Warnicke					7:30.83	14
5000 m	Gunda Niemann					6:59.65	2nd place, silver medalist(s)
5000 m	Claudia Pechstein					6:59.61 WR	1st place, gold medalist(s)
