= Speed skating at the 1998 Winter Olympics – Women's 3000 metres =

Women's 3000 metres at the XVIII Olympic Winter Games
- Venue: M-Wave
- Dates: February 11, 1998
- Competitors: 31 from 16 nations
- Winning time: 4:07.29 OR

Medalists
1st place, gold medalist(s)		Gunda Niemann-Stirnemann; Germany
2nd place, silver medalist(s)		Claudia Pechstein; Germany
3rd place, bronze medalist(s)		Anni Friesinger; Germany

The women's 3000 metres in speed skating at the 1998 Winter Olympics took place on 11 February, at the M-Wave.

== Records ==
Prior to this competition, the existing world and Olympic records were as follows:

World record	Claudia Pechstein (GER)	4:07.13	Hamar, Norway	13 December 1997
Olympic record	Yvonne van Gennip (NED)	4:11.94	Calgary, Canada	23 February 1988

The following new World and Olympic records was set during this competition.

Date	Pair	Athlete	Country	Time	OR	WR
11 February	Pair 11	Jennifer Rodriguez	United States	4:11.64	OR	
11 February	Pair 12	Anni Friesinger	Germany	4:09.44	OR	
11 February	Pair 13	Claudia Pechstein	Germany	4:08.47	OR	
11 February	Pair 15	Gunda Niemann-Stirnemann	Germany	4:07.29	OR	

== Results ==
Rank	Pair	Lane	Name	Country	Time	Behind	Notes
1st place, gold medalist(s)	15	O	Gunda Niemann-Stirnemann	Germany	4:07.29	-	OR
2nd place, silver medalist(s)	13	O	Claudia Pechstein	Germany	4:08.47	+1.18	
3rd place, bronze medalist(s)	12	O	Anni Friesinger	Germany	4:09.44	+2.15	
4	11	O	Jennifer Rodriguez	United States	4:11.64	+4.35	
5	13	I	Emese Hunyady	Austria	4:12.01	+4.72	
6	15	I	Kirstin Holum	United States	4:12.24	+4.95	
7	9	O	Lyudmila Prokasheva	Kazakhstan	4:14.23	+6.94	
8	10	I	Annamarie Thomas	Netherlands	4:14.38	+7.09	
9	16	I	Carla Zijlstra	Netherlands	4:16.43	+9.14	
10	16	O	Svetlana Bazhanova	Russia	4:16.45	+9.16	
11	14	I	Elena Belci	Italy	4:16.62	+9.33	
12	5	I	Svetlana Vysokova	Russia	4:17.70	+10.41	
13	9	I	Tatyana Trapeznikova	Russia	4:17.76	+10.47	
14	10	O	Mie Uehara	Japan	4:17.92	+10.63	
15	12	I	Anette Tønsberg	Norway	4:19.24	+11.95	
16	14	O	Tonny de Jong	Netherlands	4:19.54	+12.25	
17	6	I	Chiharu Nozaki	Japan	4:19.60	+12.31	
18	11	I	Noriko Munekata	Japan	4:20.72	+13.43	
19	7	I	Cindy Overland	Canada	4:20.81	+13.52	
20	5	O	Lee Gyeong-nam	South Korea	4:21.10	+13.81	
21	6	O	Susan Massitti	Canada	4:21.66	+14.37	
22	2	O	Catherine Raney-Norman	United States	4:22.55	+15.26	
23	7	O	Baeg Eun-bi	South Korea	4:24.50	+17.21	
24	8	O	Mihaela Dascălu	Romania	4:26.65	+19.36	
25	8	I	Ingrid Liepa	Canada	4:27.99	+ 20.70	
26	4	O	Song Li	China	4:28.99	+ 21.70	
27	3	O	Emese Dörfler-Antal	Austria	4:33.67	+26.38	
28	1	I	Ilonda Lūse	Latvia	4:33.77	+26.48	
29	4	I	Svetlana Chepelnikova	Belarus	4:36.97	+29.68	
30	2	I	Svitlana Konstantynova	Ukraine	4:37.27	+29.98	
31	3	I	Kenzhesh Sarsekenova-Orynbayeva	Kazakhstan	4:42.07	+34.78	
