= M-Wave =

Speed skating oval in Nagano, Japan

Nagano Olympic Memorial Arena
- 長野市オリンピック記念アリーナ
- M-Wave
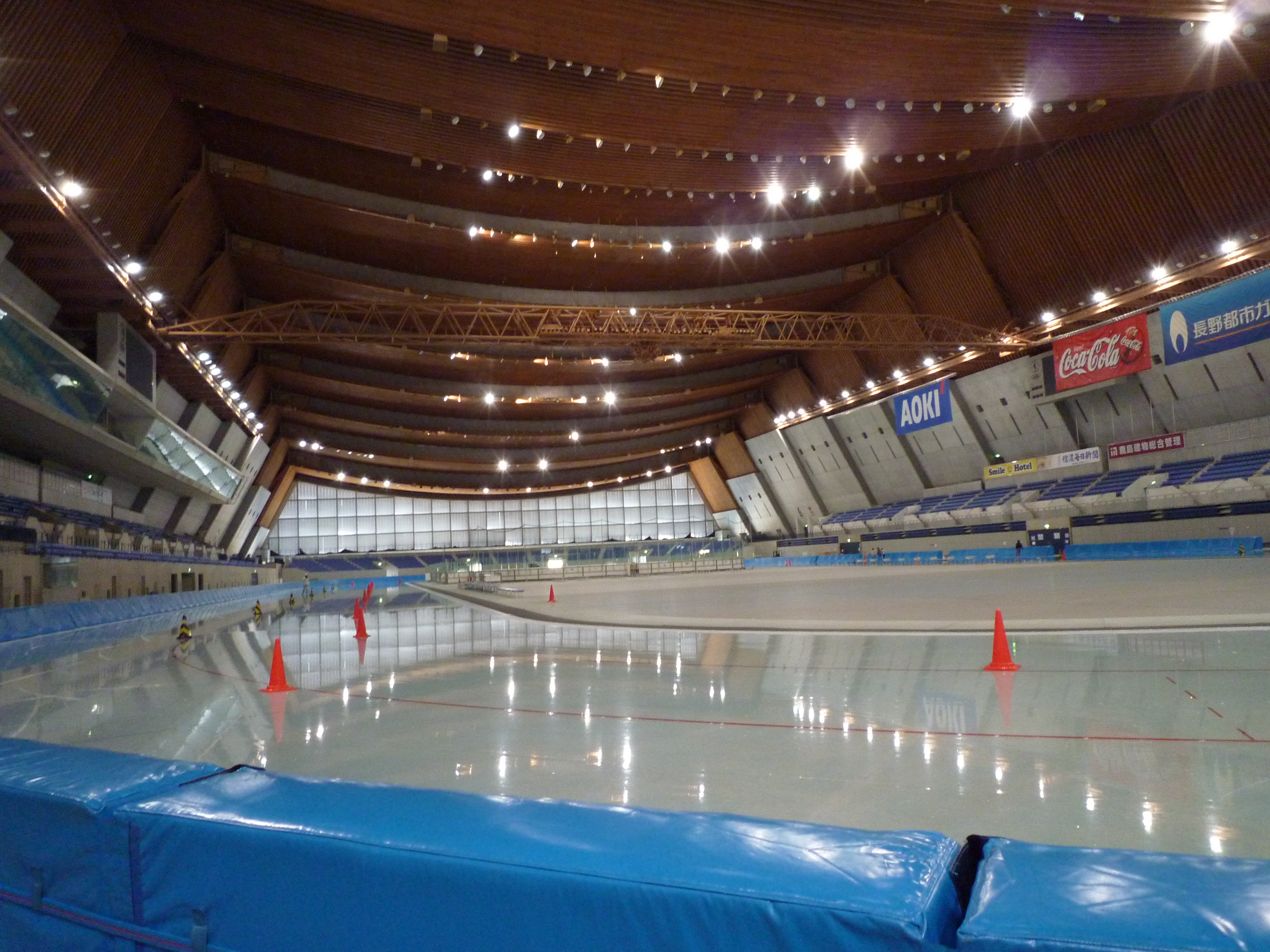
- M-Wave, inside
- Interactive map of Nagano Olympic Memorial Arena
- Location: 195 Oaza-Kita-Nagaike, Nagano, Nagano, Japan
- Coordinates: 36°38′26″N 138°14′25″E
- Owner: Nagano City
- Operator: M-Wave Corporation
- Capacity: 20,000 (10,000 seats)
- Surface: ice
- Field size: 76,100 m^{2}
- Public transit: Nagaden Bus, No. 8 Suzaka-Yashima Line, Watauchi-Yashima Line

Construction
- Groundbreaking: 1994; 32 years ago
- Opened: 1996; 30 years ago
- Cost: ¥384 billion
- Main contractors: Kume Sekkei, Kajima, Okumura, Nissan Rinkai Construction, Iijima Construction, Takagi Construction

Website
- Nagano Olympic Memorial Arena M-Wave

Nagano Olympic Memorial Arena (長野市オリンピック記念アリーナ, Nagano-shi Orinpikku Kinen Ari-na), or M-Wave (エムウェーブ, emu-ue-bu), is a covered speed skating oval in the city of Nagano, Japan. M-Wave, which opened in November, 1996, was constructed for the speed skating events at the 1998 Winter Olympics. It was Japan's first International Skating Union (ISU) standard indoor 400m double-track, and only second indoor track speed skating in Japan. The other, Meiji Hokkaido-Tokachi Oval, is located in Obihiro, Hokkaido.

In addition to the 1998 Winter Olympics and Paralympics, the 2002 World Figure Skating Championships, various ISU world speed skating championships and speed skating world cups, and the 2005 Special Winter Olympics were held.Outside the winter business, other sporting events, large-scale exhibitions and concerts are held.

M-Wave is located in the eastern sections of Nagano City, in the communities of Asahi (朝陽) and Mamejima (大豆島), near the Chikuma River and the city of Suzaka (須坂). M-Wave is located within short distance of four other venues of the 1998 Winter Olympics. It is 3 kilometers from the Aqua Wing Arena, which hosted ice hockey; 5 kilometers from Big Hat, which also hosted ice hockey; 6 kilometers from White Ring (arena), which hosted the figure skating and short track speed skating events; and 11 kilometers from Nagano Olympic Stadium, which was used for the opening and closing ceremonies.

The skating rink operates from October to March, with the 400-m speed skating oval and a regulation-size ice hockey rink inside the oval.

M-Wave was constructed at a cost of 348 billion yen as a speed skating venue for the 1998 Winter Olympics. The building's name, M-Wave comes from its distinct shape which is designed to resemble the surrounding mountains. The building, which was the recipient of the Special Award by the British Institution of Structural Engineers, is one of the largest hanging wooden roof structures in the world. The arena has a capacity of 18,000. The M-Wave is equipped with movable stands and an automatically winding artificial lawn machine. The two movable stands, each of which have seating for 1,210 spectators, allow the arena to be converted into various configurations including concert hall or a football field.

== History ==
Construction of the M-Wave was completed on November 21, 1996. It was the fourth Nagano Winter Olympic venue to be completed.

In 1998, The M-Wave had projected annual maintenance costs of 524 million yen. Nagano City commissioned a public–private partnership company, M-Wave Corporation, to operate the arena. In a report of venue costs and usage 20 years after the Olympics, M-Wave and Spiral, which was used for bobsleigh, luge, and skeleton were singled out as examples of successful usage. In particular, M-Wave remains profitable. The economic ripple effect from the National Junior High School Skating Championships, which have taken place at M-Wave and Big Hat every year since 2008, alone brings in 250 million yen.

M-Wave Corporation operates M-Wave and Big Hat, which is now a multipurpose sport, theatre, and meeting venue. Since January, 2019, the president of M-Wave Corporation is Shinichi Takizawa, formerly of JTB Corporation and past managing director of the Nagano Convention and Visitors Bureau.

== Speed Skating Championship Events ==
=== 1997 World Allround Speed Skating Championships ===
The 1997 World Allround Speed Skating Championships were held between February 14 and 16, 1997 at the M-Wave. The Allround Speed Skating Championships are annual speed skating championships. Over two days, skaters race the 500m and 1000m on two days each, each once in the inner lane and once in the outer lane, for both races. The 1997 event was held as a test event for M-Wave in preparation for the 1998 Winter Olympics. The women's medalists were Gunda Niemann - gold, Claudia Pechstein - silver, and Tonny de Jong - bronze. The men's medalists were Ids Postma - gold, Keiji Shirahata - silver, and Frank Dittrich - bronze.

=== 1998 Winter Olympics ===
During the 1998 Winter Olympics, M-Wave hosted the long—track speed skating events between 8 February and 20 February. In all, ten events were contested, five each in women's and men's speed skating: 500m, 1000m, 1500m, and 5000m for both men and women, and 3000m for women and 10,000m for men.

A total of 25 nations participated in long-track speed skating at these games, with eight nations winning medals, including the Netherlands with eleven, Germany with six, Canada with five, and host nation Japan with three.

Nine athletes were multiple medal winners. Both Marianne Timmer and Gianni Romme won two gold medals each. Both Gunda Niemann-Stirnemann and Rintje Ritsma won three medals each. Other multiple medal winners were Catriona Le May Doan, Claudia Pechstein, Chris Witty, Ids Postma, and Hiroyasu Shimizu.

Five world records and twelve Olympic records were set at the M-Wave during the 1998 Winter Olympics. The world records were set by Marianne Timmer (1500m), Claudia Pechstein (5000m), Gianni Romme (5000m and 10000m), and Ådne Søndrål (1500m).

=== 1998 Winter Paralympics ===
During the 1998 Winter Paralympics, M-Wave hosted the opening and closing ceremonies and the ice sledge speed racing events between 5 and 14 March. In all, sixteen events were contested, eight in women's and another eight in men's: 100m, 500m, 1000m, and 1500m for both men and woman in two competitions classes.

=== 1999 Asian Speed Skating Championships ===
The 1999 Asian Speed Skating Championships, an all-round completion, were held between January 9 and 10, 1999, at M-Wave. Japanese female and male skaters won all medals, including Maki Tabata who finished first in the 500, 3000m, 1500m, and second in the 5000m.

=== World Single Distances Speed Skating Championships ===
==== 2000 ====
The 2000 World Single Distances Speed Skating Championships were held at M-Wave from 3 March and 5 March. In all, ten events were contested, men's and women's 500 meters, 1000 meters, 1500 meters, 5000 meters, and women's 3000, and men's 10,000. Germany and Netherlands won nine medals, including five gold and three gold respectively. Host Japan won three medals, including one gold by Hiroyasu Shimizu. Gianni Romme, Monique Garbrecht, and Claudia Pechstein each won two gold.

==== 2008 ====
The 2008 World Single Distance Speed Skating Championships were held at M-Wave from 6 March and 9 March. In all, 12 events were contested, men's and women's 500 meters, 1000 meters, 1500 meters, 5000 meters, team pursuit, and women's 3000, and men's 10,000. Netherlands won 11 medals, including four gold, Canada won nine medals, including three gold. Joji Kato won a bronze medal for host Japan. Sven Kramer and Anni Friesinger each won two gold. In the men's 1500 won by Denny Morrison, no bronze medal was awarded as Sven Kramer and Shani Davis tied for silver.

=== World Sprint Speed Skating Championships ===
==== 2004 ====
The women's medalists were Marianne Timmer - gold, Anni Friesinger - silver, and Jennifer Rodriguez - bronze. The men's medalists were Erben Wennemars - gold, Jeremy Wotherspoon - silver, and Mike Ireland - bronze.

==== 2014 ====
The 2014 World Sprint Speed Skating Championships took place January 18–19, 2014. The women's medalists were Yu Jing - gold, Zhang Hong - silver, and Heather Richardson - bronze. The men's medalists were Michel Mulder - gold, Shani Davis - silver, and Daniel Greig - bronze.

=== All Japan Speed Skating Distance Championships ===
The All Japan Speed Skating Distance Championships (全日本スピードスケート距離別選手権大会, Zennihon supi-dosuke-to kyori betsu senshuken taikai) have been held in autumn at the M-Wave. In 2018, the 25th Annual All Japan Speed Skating Distance Championships were held from October 26 to October 28.

=== ISU Speed Skating World Cup ===
Since 1998, M-Wave has hosted ten ISU Speed Skating World Cup events, one each in speed skating seasons of 1998–99, 2000–01, 2002–03, 2004–05, 2006–07, 2008–09, 2012–13, 2013–14, 2016–17, and 2019–2020.

== Other Championship Events ==
=== 2002 World Figure Skating Championships ===
The 2002 World Figure Skating Championships were held at M-Wave from 16 March and 24 March. In all, four events were contested, men's and women's singles, pairs, and ice dance. Six nations won medals, including four by Russia, three by the United States and two by host nation Japan.

=== 2005 Special Olympics World Winter Games ===
The 2005 Special Olympics World Winter Games were held in Nagano between February 26 and March 5. In addition to the speed skating events, M-Wave hosted the opening and closing ceremonies.

== General Usage of the Arena ==
=== Public Skating ===
During the skating season, from October to March, Ice skating is typically available throughout the day, except during tournaments and other special events. Skating is available for 1510 yen for adults or 810 yen for junior high school students and younger, on weekends; and 820 yen for adults (or 410 yen for junior high school students and younger) during weekdays. A very large selection of speed skates, ice hockey skates, and figure skates are available to rent for 610 yen. Skaters may bring their own skates as well. One day per month, usually a Sunday, during skating season, the arena is open to the general public for free. Entrance to arena is via the South Entrance.

=== Nagano Olympic Commemorative Marathon ===
The Nagano Olympic Commemorative Marathon (長野オリンピック記念 長野マラソン, Nagano Orinpikku Kinen Nagano Marason), an IAAF Bronze Label Road Race competition., which has both elite and amateur runners, circles M-Wave at the 17 km mark of the race.

== Access ==
=== Public Transportation ===
By local bus, the M-Wave is approximately 5 kilometers east of JR Nagano Station. Nagaden Bus, No. 8, the Suzaka-Yashima Line and the Watauchi-Yashima Line, depart from the south exit of Nagano Station. The nearest bus stops to the M-Wave are M-Wave Mae (エムウェーブ前) or Nagano Higashi Koukou (長野東高校).

=== Intercity Bus ===
The M-Wave Mae bus stop is also a stop for the highway bus connecting the Shinjuku Highway Bus Terminal in Tokyo with Nagano.

=== Car ===
By car, M-Wave is approximately 5 minutes from the Suzaka/Nagano Higashi IC, which is on the Jōshin-etsu Expressway which runs through Gunma, Nagano, and Niigata, and which connects to the Kan-Etsu Expressway linking this region to Tokyo. M-Wave is also approximately 15 minutes by car from Nagano city center. At the M-Wave, there are 300 car parking spaces outside, or up to 60 coaches, and 500 car underground parking spaces.

=== Roads ===
- "M-Wave Dori", Nagano Prefectural road Route 58 runs from Nagano Station to the Suzaka/Nagano Higashi IC.
- Nagano Prefectural road Route 372 runs from Sansai to Mamejima.
- Route 58 and Route 372 meet at M-Wave Intersection.

== Surrounding area ==
Directly across the street from the M-Wave is a four-block 10-12 storey apartment complex named Asahi Danchi (朝陽団地). This complex was the site of the Media Village during the 1998 Winter Olympics. Asahi Danchi includes private sector housing as well as housing for prefectural employees.

== Gallery ==
M-Wave
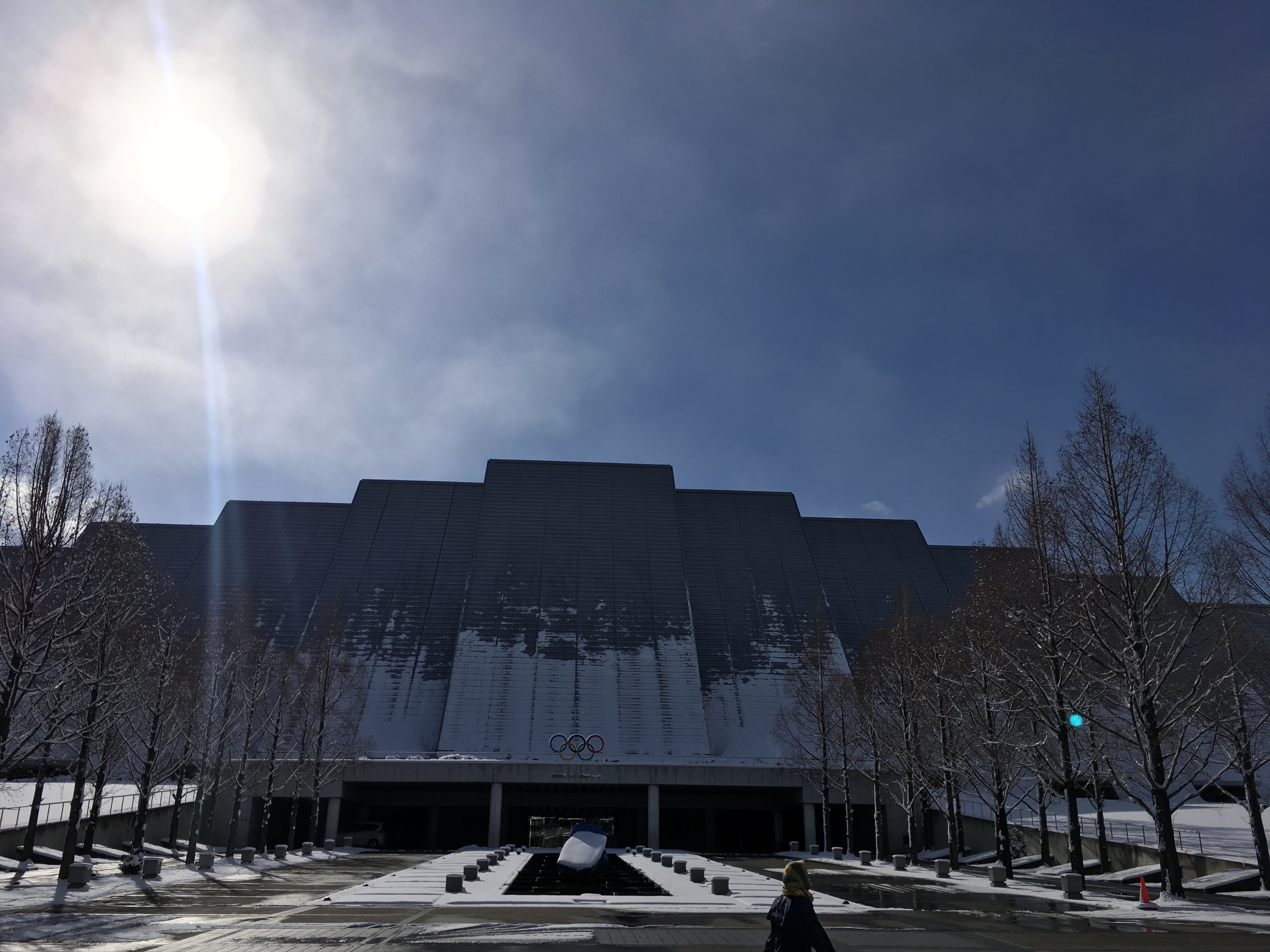
M-Wave north exterior in winter

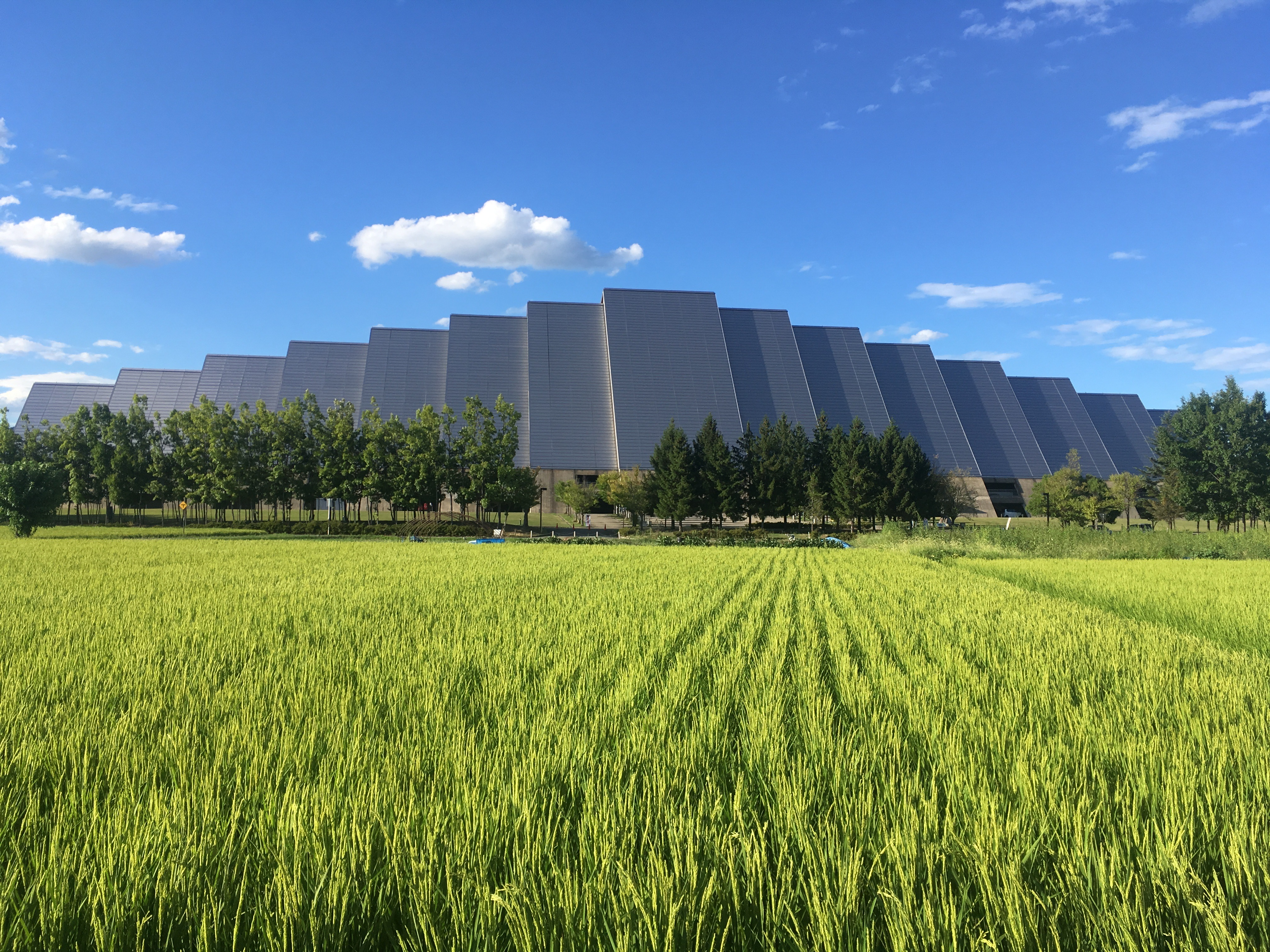
M-Wave south exterior in summer

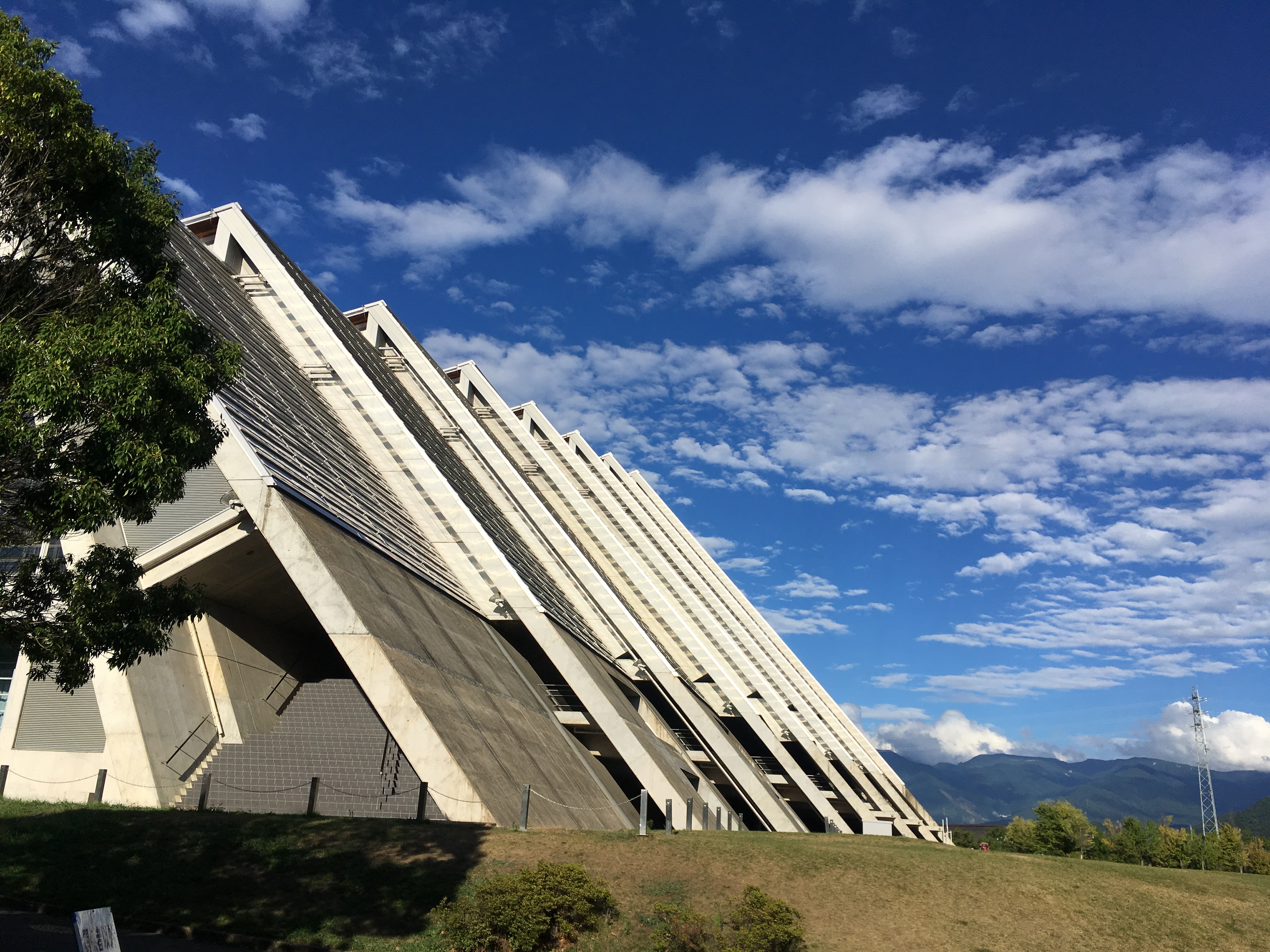
View of M-Wave from the southwest corner, its shape reflecting the surrounding mountains

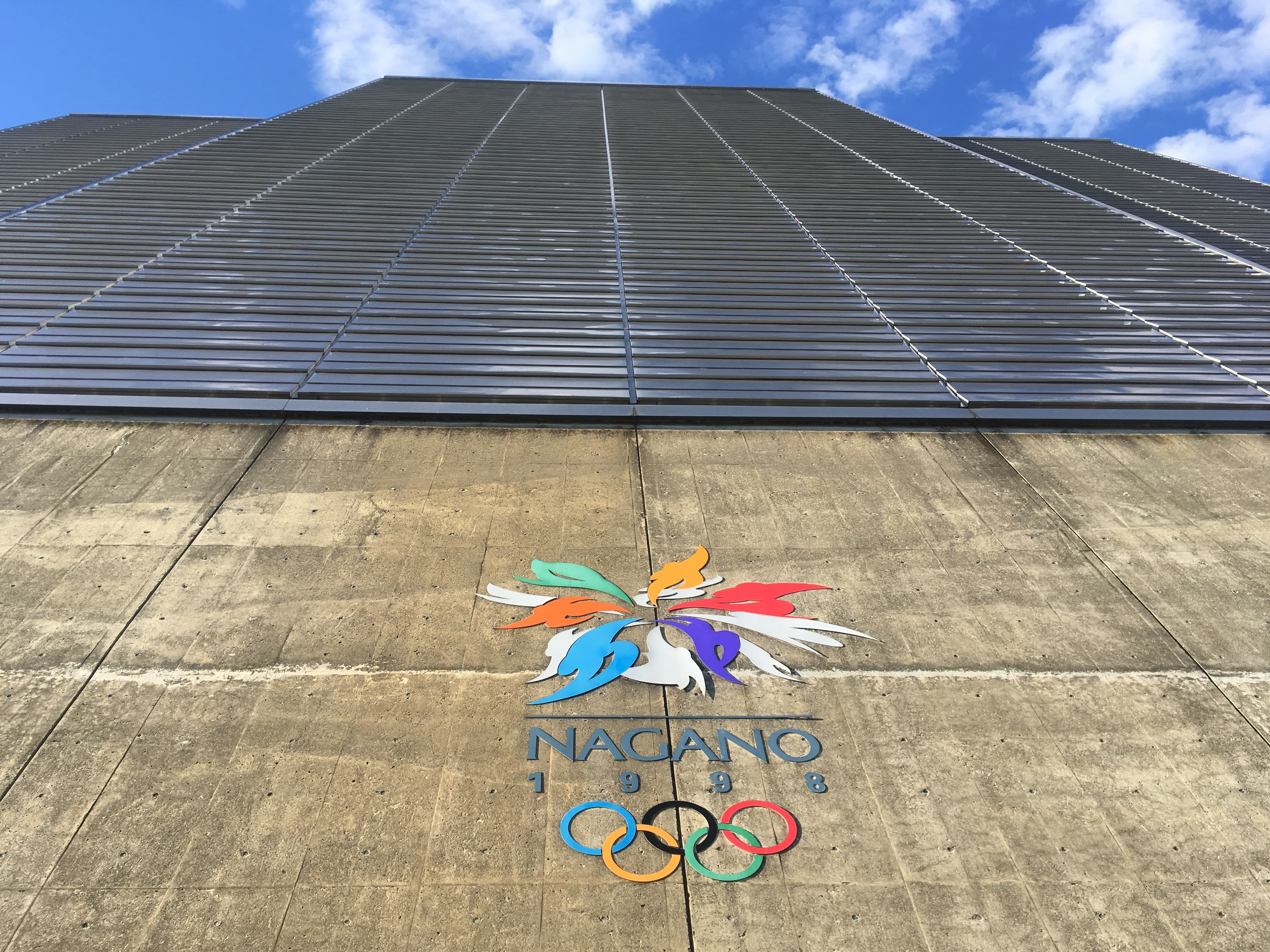
Nagano Olympic logo above the M-Wave south entrance

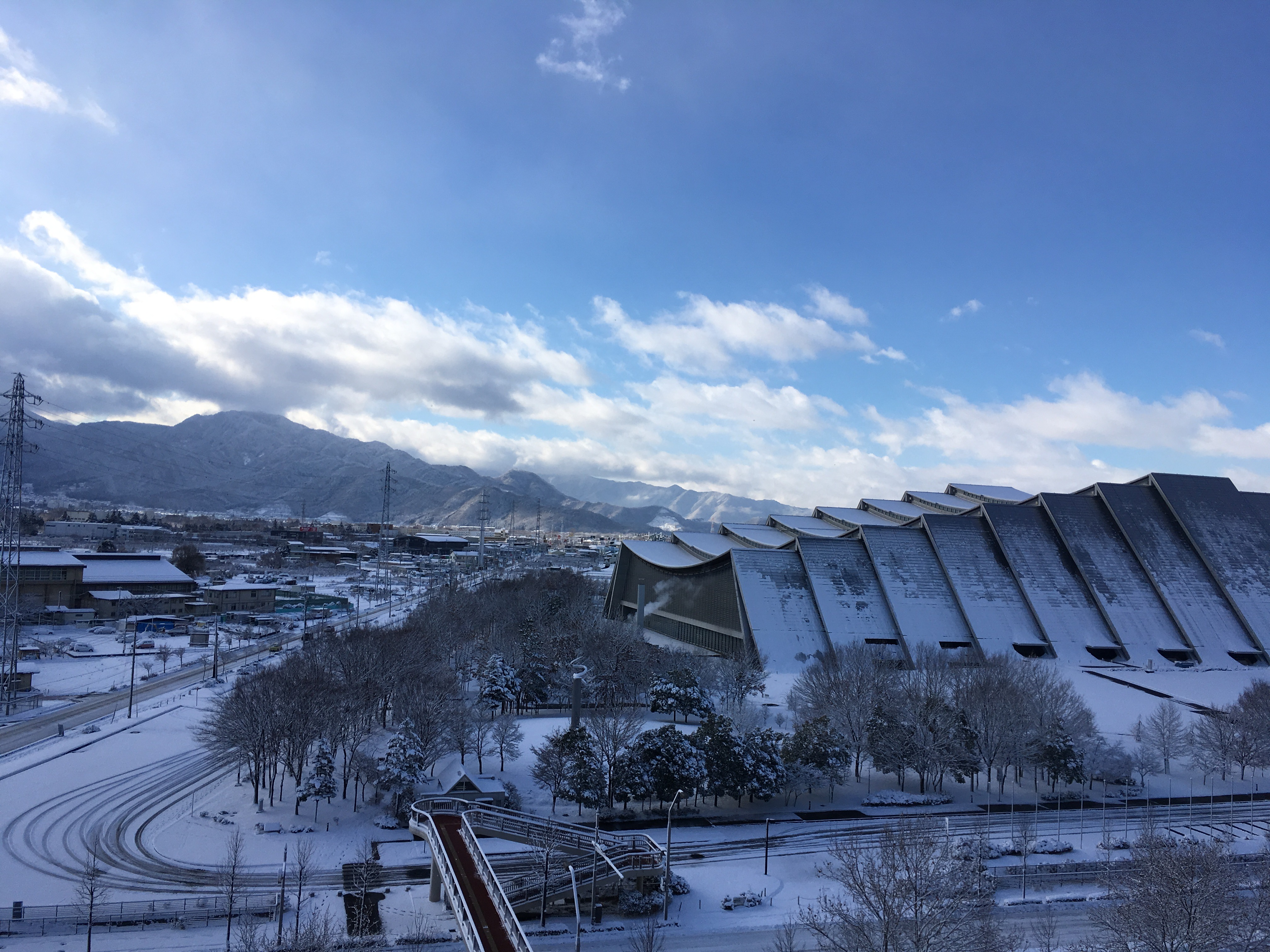
M-Wave northeast corner in winter

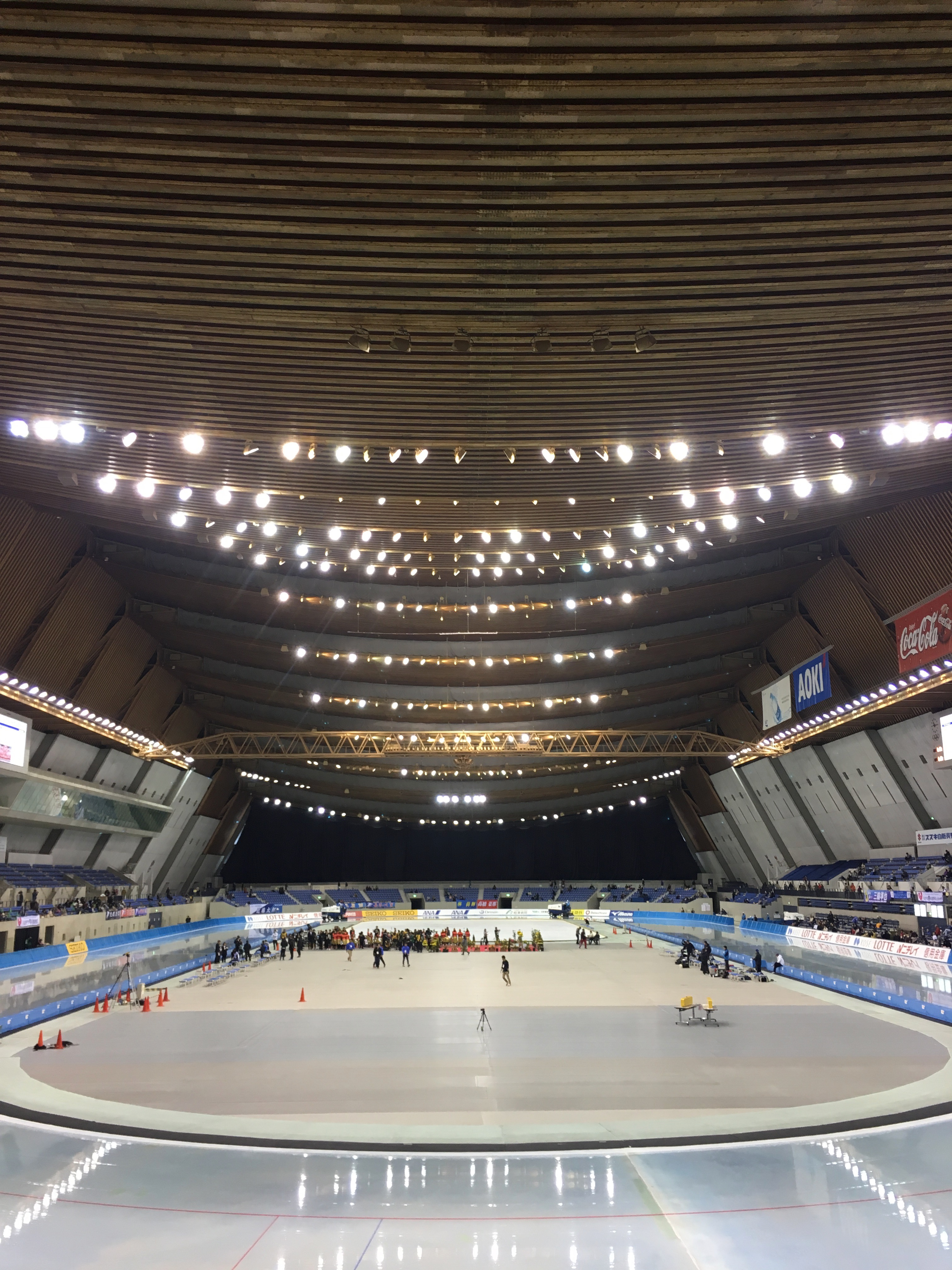
M-Wave interior with the ice hockey rink inside the oval in the background

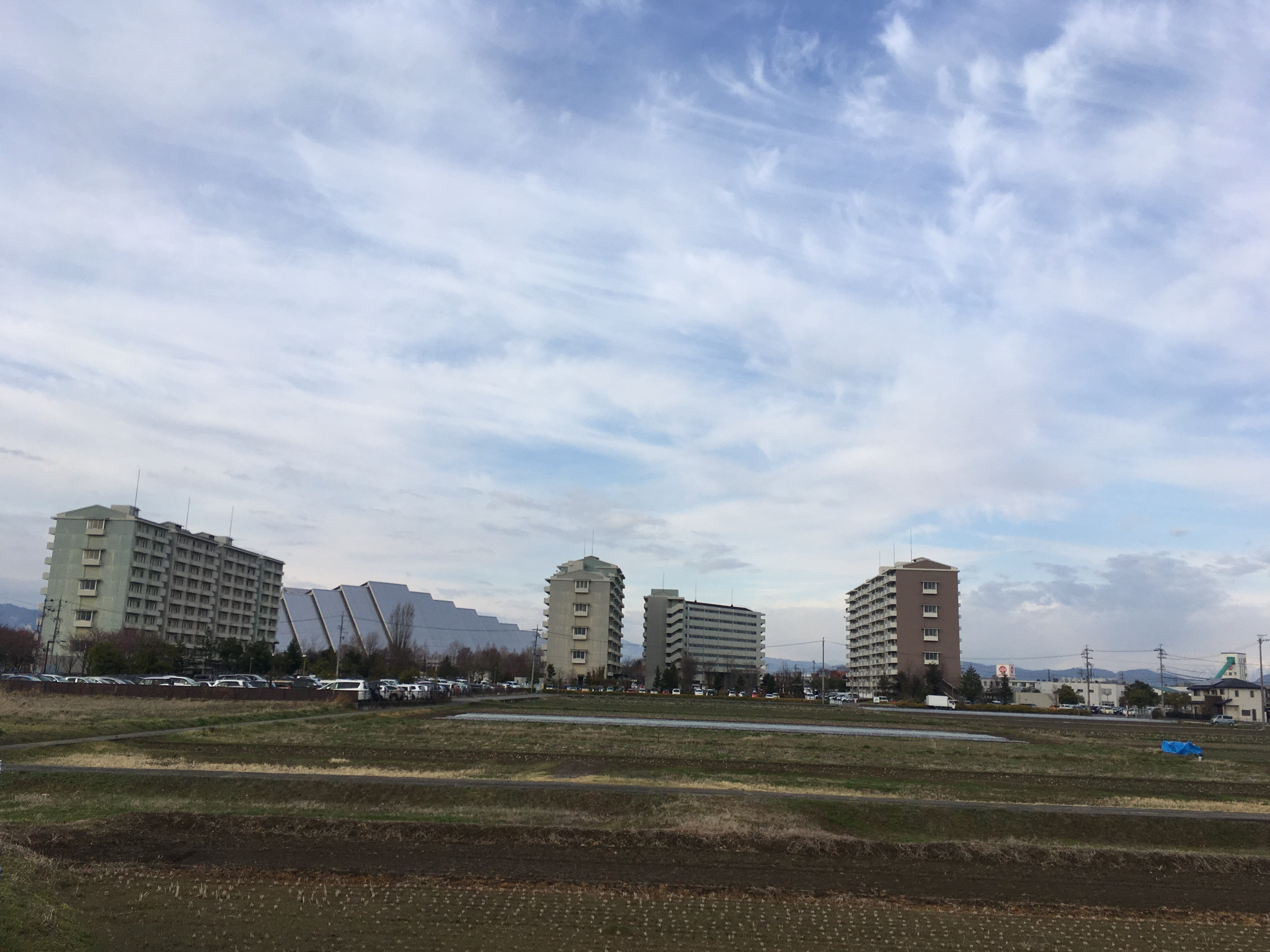
The Media Village, now Asahi Danchi, with M-Wave in the background

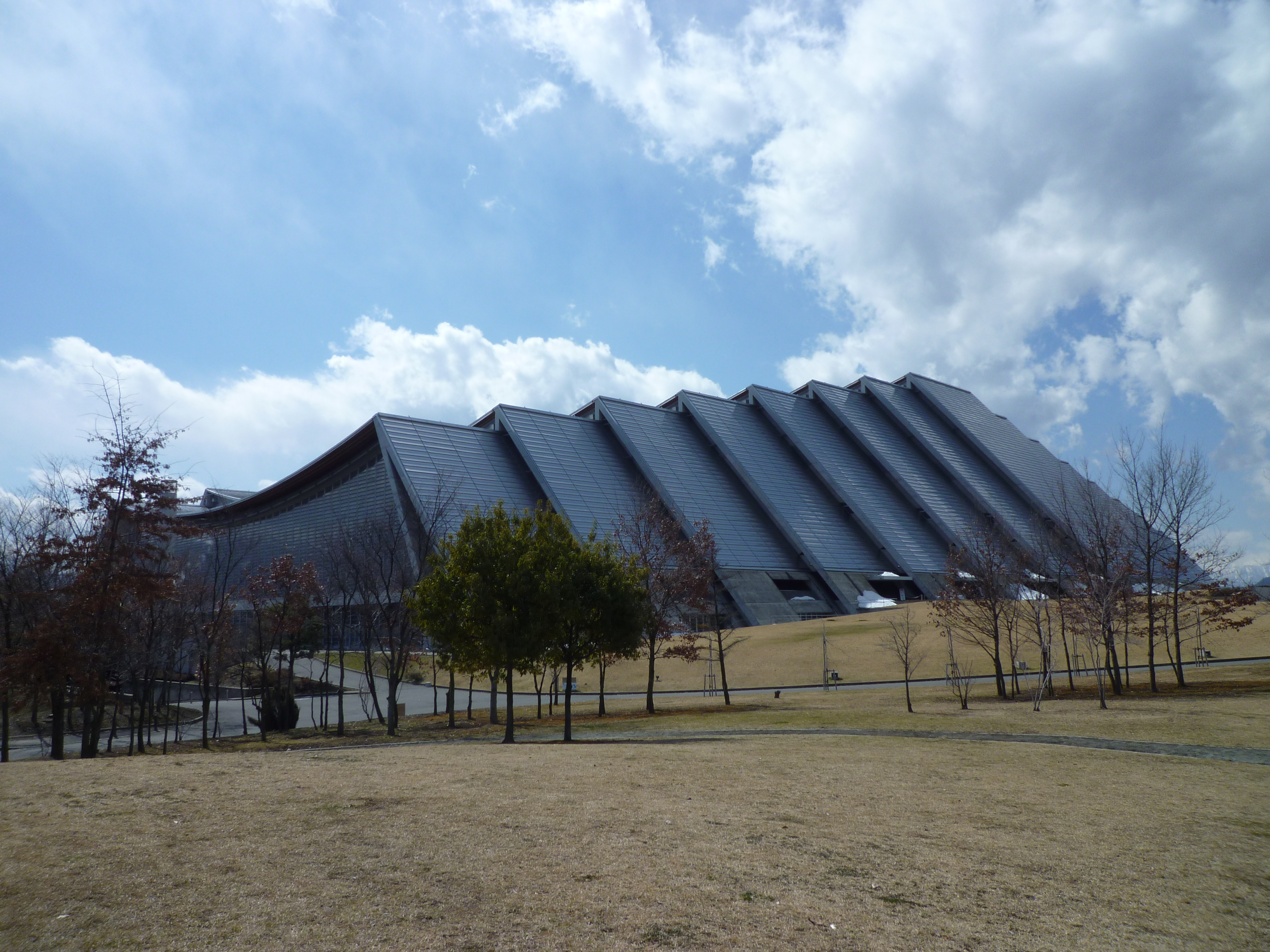
The M-Wave

== Track records ==
Men
Distance	Time	Skater	Date	Duration
500 m	34.40	(Japan) Tatsuya Shinhama	20 December 2023	984 days
1000 m	1:07.18	(United States) Jordan Stolz	23 November 2024	645 days
1500 m	1:43.65	(United States) Jordan Stolz	22 November 2024	646 days
3000 m	3:40.83	(Japan) Seitaro Ichinohe	13 October 2018	2878 days
5000 m	6:12.71	(Italy) Davide Ghiotto	23 November 2024	645 days
10000 m	12:57.71	(Netherlands) Sven Kramer	8 March 2008	6749 days
Team pursuit	3:41.69	Netherlands	9 March 2008	6748 days

Women
Distance	Time	Skater	Date	Duration
500 m	37.13	(Japan) Nao Kodaira	27 December 2017	3168 days
1000 m	1:13.21	(Japan) Miho Takagi	12 February 2021	2025 days
1500 m	1:52.78	(Japan) Miho Takagi	13 February 2021	2024 days
3000 m	3:59.81	(Japan) Miho Takagi	29 December 2021	1705 days
5000 m	6:50.83	(Czech Republic) Martina Sáblíková	9 March 2008	6748 days
Team pursuit	2:58.69	Netherlands	19 November 2016	3571 days

== See also ==
- List of indoor arenas in Japan
- List of indoor speed skating rinks
