= Speed skating at the 1998 Winter Olympics – Women's 5000 metres =

Women's 5000 metres at the XVIII Olympic Winter Games
- Venue: M-Wave
- Dates: February 20th, 1998
- Competitors: 16 from 9 nations
- Winning time: 6:59.61 WR

Medalists
1st place, gold medalist(s)		Claudia Pechstein; Germany
2nd place, silver medalist(s)		Gunda Niemann-Stirnemann; Germany
3rd place, bronze medalist(s)		Lyudmila Prokasheva; Kazakhstan

The women's 5000 metres in speed skating at the 1998 Winter Olympics took place on February 20, at the M-Wave.

== Records ==
Prior to this competition, the existing world and Olympic records were as follows:

World record	Gunda Niemann-Kleemann (GER)	7:03.26	Calgary, Canada	26 March 1994
Olympic record	Yvonne van Gennip (NED)	7:14.13	Calgary, Canada	28 February 1988

The following new World and Olympic records was set during this competition.

Date	Pair	Athlete	Country	Time	OR	WR
February 20	Pair 2	Tonny de Jong	Netherlands	7:12.77	OR	
February 20	Pair 5	Lyudmila Prokasheva	Kazakhstan	7:11.14	OR	
February 20	Pair 7	Gunda Niemann-Stirnemann	Germany	6:59.65	OR	WR
February 20	Pair 8	Claudia Pechstein	Germany	6:59.61	OR	WR

== Results ==
Rank	Pair	Lane	Name	Country	Time	Behind	Notes
1st place, gold medalist(s)	8	O	Claudia Pechstein	Germany	6:59.61	-	(WR)
2nd place, silver medalist(s)	7	O	Gunda Niemann-Stirnemann	Germany	6:59.65	+0.04	
3rd place, bronze medalist(s)	5	O	Lyudmila Prokasheva	Kazakhstan	7:11.14	+11.53	
4	6	O	Barbara de Loor	Netherlands	7:11.81	+12.20	
5	2	O	Tonny de Jong	Netherlands	7:12.77	+13.16	
6	3	O	Carla Zijlstra	Netherlands	7:12.89	+13.28	
7	5	I	Kirstin Holum	United States	7:14.20	+14.59	
8	6	I	Emese Hunyady	Austria	7:15.23	+15.62	
9	4	I	Elena Belci	Italy	7:15.58	+15.97	
10	7	I	Jennifer Rodriguez	United States	7:16.78	+17.17	
11	1	O	Mie Uehara	Japan	7:21.72	+22.11	
12	3	I	Svetlana Vysokova	Russia	7:22.18	+22.58	
13	1	I	Anette Tønsberg	Norway	7:28.39	+28.78	
14	8	I	Heike Warnicke	Germany	7:30.83	+31.22	
15	2	I	Nami Nemoto	Japan	7:36.77	+37.16	
