= 1998 Winter Olympics medal table =

1998 Winter Olympics medals
- Location: Nagano, Japan

Highlights
- Most gold medals: Germany (12)
- Most total medals: Germany (29)
- Medalling NOCs: 24

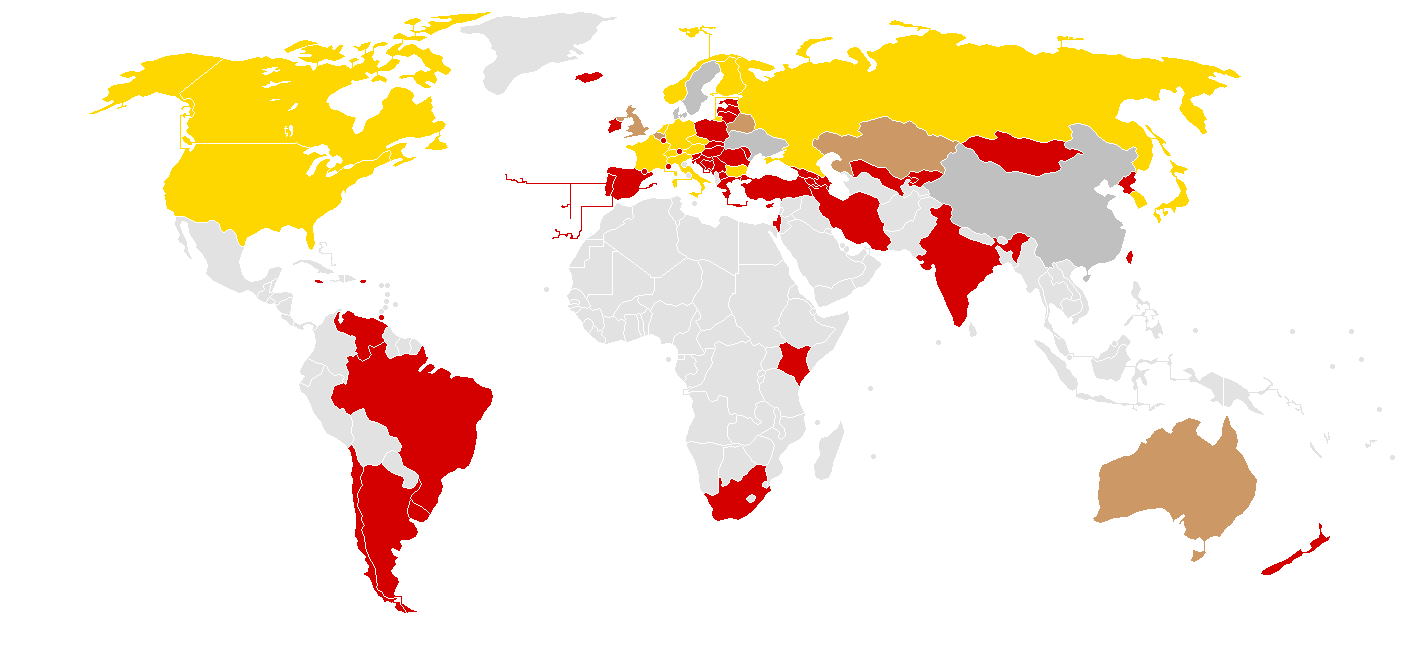
1998 Winter Olympic Games medals map Legend: Gold represents countries that won at least one gold medal Silver represents countries that won at least one silver medal Bronze represents countries that won at least one bronze medal Red represents countries that did not win any medals Grey represents countries that did not participate

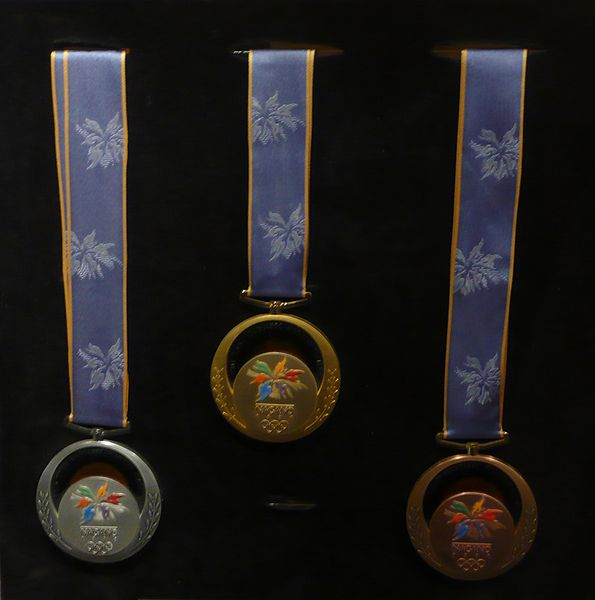
The silver, gold, and bronze medals

The 1998 Winter Olympics, officially known as the XVIII Olympic Winter Games, were a winter multi-sport event held in Nagano, Japan, from 7 to 22 February 1998. Twenty-four nations earned medals at these Games, and fifteen won at least one gold medal; forty-eight countries left the Olympics without winning a medal. Competitors from Germany earned the highest number of gold medals (12) and the most overall medals (29). With 10 gold medals and 25 overall medals, Norway finished second in both categories. Denmark won its first Winter Olympics medal, while Bulgaria and the Czech Republic won their first Winter Games gold medals. Azerbaijan, Kenya, Macedonia, Uruguay, and Venezuela competed for the first time, but none of them won a medal.

Varying statistics are reported for the number of participants at the 1998 Winter Olympics. The Sports-Reference website states that 2,180 athletes from 72 nations participated in 68 events from 14 sports and disciplines. Olympic historian Bill Mallon, in his Historical Dictionary of the Olympic Movement, agrees with the figure of 2,180 participants. In contrast, the International Olympic Committee (IOC) website reports that 2,176 athletes competed at the Games. The sport of curling returned after a single appearance in the 1924 Olympics, snowboarding was added as a new sport, and women's ice hockey made its first appearance in the Olympics.

The leading medal winner at the Games was Russian skier Larisa Lazutina, who won five medals, including three golds. The only other athlete to win three gold medals was Norwegian skier Bjørn Dæhlie, who won four medals overall, making him the first Winter Olympian to win twelve career medals, eight of which were gold. Nine other athletes won three medals, including three Germans. American figure skater Tara Lipinski became the youngest competitor in Winter Olympics history to earn a gold medal in an individual event.

== Medal table ==
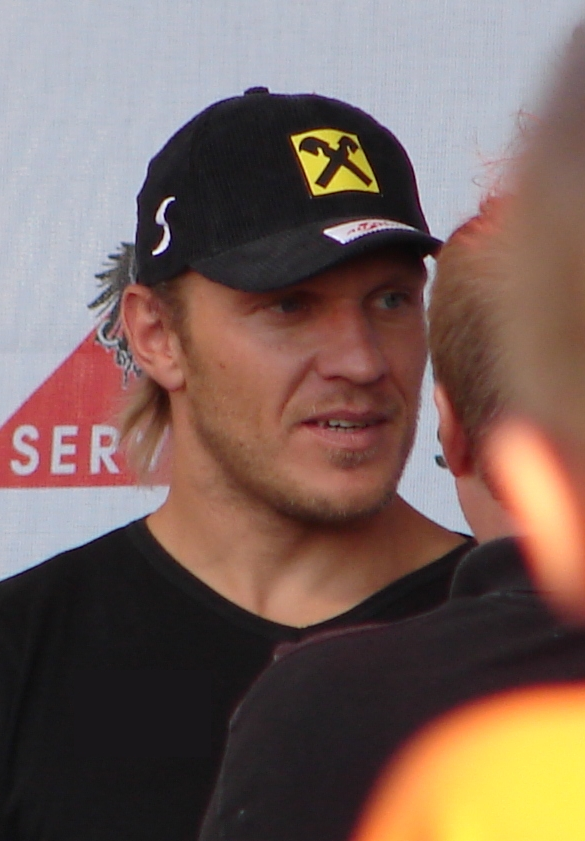
Austrian skier Hermann Maier won gold medals in the Super G and Giant Slalom.

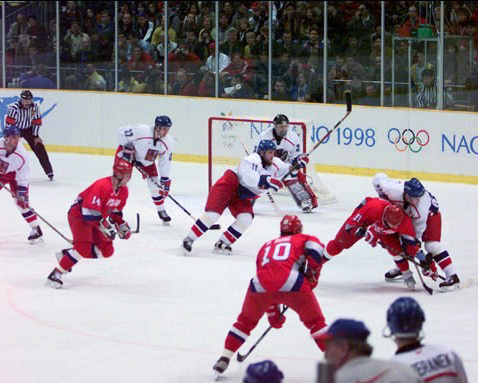
The men's ice hockey gold medal game between Russia and the Czech Republic

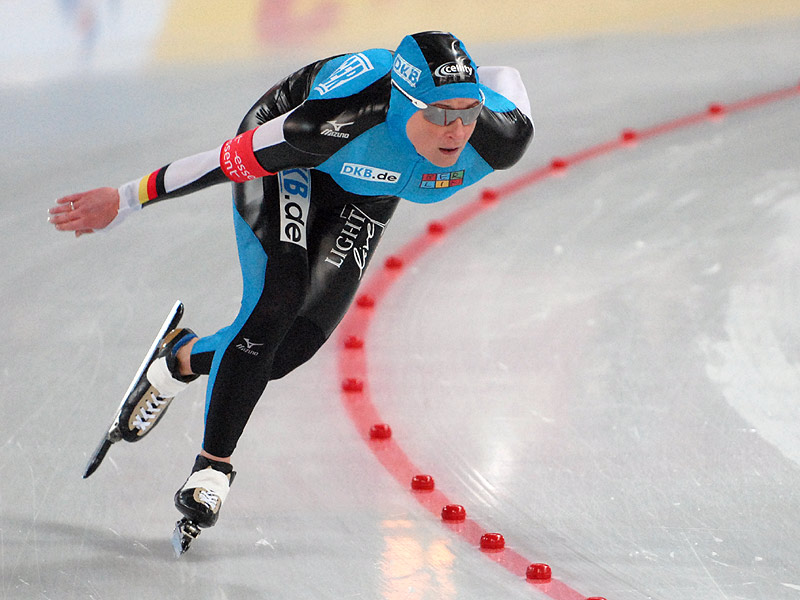
German speed skater Claudia Pechstein won a gold medal in the women's 5,000 meters and a silver in the 3,000 meters.

The medal table is based on information provided by the International Olympic Committee (IOC) and is consistent with IOC conventional sorting in its published medal tables. The table uses the Olympic medal table sorting method. By default, the table is ordered by the number of gold medals the athletes from a nation have won, where a nation is an entity represented by a NOC. The number of silver medals is taken into consideration next and then the number of bronze medals. If teams are still tied, equal ranking is given and they are listed alphabetically by their IOC country code.

In the two-man bobsleigh competition, a tie meant that two gold medals were awarded, so no silver medal was awarded for that event. A tie for second in the men's Super G skiing competition meant that a pair of silver medals were given out, so no bronze medal was awarded for that event. In the four-man bobsleigh, a tie for third resulted in the awarding of two bronze medals. Due to these ties, the number of gold medals awarded was one more than the number of silver or bronze medals. In snowboarding, Canadian Ross Rebagliati won the gold medal in the men's Giant Slalom, but it was briefly stripped by the IOC after he tested positive for marijuana. After the Canadian Olympic Association filed an appeal, however, the IOC's decision was overturned.

* Host nation (Japan)

1998 Winter Olympics medal table
Rank	NOC	Gold	Silver	Bronze	Total
1	Germany	12	9	8	29
2	Norway	10	10	5	25
3	Russia	9	6	3	18
4	Canada	6	5	4	15
5	United States	6	3	4	13
6	Netherlands	5	4	2	11
7	Japan*	5	1	4	10
8	Austria	3	5	9	17
9	South Korea	3	1	2	6
10	Italy	2	6	2	10
11	Finland	2	4	6	12
12	Switzerland	2	2	3	7
13	France	2	1	5	8
14	Czech Republic	1	1	1	3
15	Bulgaria	1	0	0	1
16	China	0	6	2	8
17	Sweden	0	2	1	3
18	Denmark	0	1	0	1
18	Ukraine	0	1	0	1
20	Belarus	0	0	2	2
20	Kazakhstan	0	0	2	2
22	Australia	0	0	1	1
22	Belgium	0	0	1	1
22	Great Britain	0	0	1	1
Totals (24 entries)		69	68	68	205
