= Holum (surname) =

Holum is a surname. Notable people with the surname include:

- Dianne Holum (born 1951), American speed skater
- John D. Holum (born 1940), American government official
- Kirstin Holum (born 1980), American speed skater, daughter of Dianne
