= Andrey Krivosheyev =

Russian speed skater

Personal information
- Native name: Андрей Кривошеев
- Full name: Andrey Krivosheyev
- Nationality: Russian
- Born: 20 October 1970 (age 55) Salavat, Russia

Sport
- Country: Russia
- Sport: Speed skating

Andrey Krivosheyev (Russian: Андрей Кривошеев; born 20 October 1970) is a Russian former speed skater. He competed in the men's 5000 metres event at the 1998 Winter Olympics.
