= Speed skating at the 1998 Winter Olympics – Women's 1500 metres =

Women's 1500 metres at the XVIII Olympic Winter Games
- Pictogram for speed skating
- Venue: M-Wave
- Dates: February 16, 1998
- Competitors: 35 from 15 nations
- Winning time: 1:57.58 WR

Medalists
1st place, gold medalist(s)		Marianne Timmer; Netherlands
2nd place, silver medalist(s)		Gunda Niemann-Stirnemann; Germany
3rd place, bronze medalist(s)		Chris Witty; United States

The women's 1500 metres in speed skating at the 1998 Winter Olympics took place on 16 February, at the M-Wave.

== Records ==
Prior to this competition, the existing world and Olympic records were as follows:

World record	Catriona LeMay Doan (CAN)	1:57.87	Calgary, Canada	29 November 1997
Olympic record	Yvonne van Gennip (NED)	2:00.68	Calgary, Canada	27 February 1988

The following new world record was set during this competition.

Date	Pair	Athlete	Country	Time	OR	WR
16 February	Pair 12	Marianne Timmer	Netherlands	1:57.58	OR	WR

== Results ==
Rank	Pair	Lane	Name	Country	Time	Behind	Notes
1st place, gold medalist(s)	12	I	Marianne Timmer	Netherlands	1:57.58	-	WR
2nd place, silver medalist(s)	18	I	Gunda Niemann-Stirnemann	Germany	1:58.66	+1.08	
3rd place, bronze medalist(s)	15	O	Chris Witty	United States	1:58.97	+1.39	
4	16	I	Emese Hunyady	Austria	1:59.19	+1.61	
5	14	O	Anni Friesinger	Germany	1:59.20	+1.62	
6	15	I	Annamarie Thomas	Netherlands	1:59.29	+1.71	
7	17	O	Claudia Pechstein	Germany	1:59.46	+1.88	
8	17	I	Jennifer Rodriguez	United States	2:00.97	+3.39	
9	11	I	Svetlana Bazhanova	Russia	2:01.54	+3.96	
10	12	O	Nataliya Polozkova	Russia	2:01.56	+3.98	
11	6	I	Lyudmila Prokasheva	Kazakhstan	2:01.65	+4.07	
12	7	I	Becky Sundstrom	United States	2:01.81	+4.23	
13	16	O	Catriona LeMay Doan	Canada	2:02.19	+4.61	
14	4	I	Moira D'Andrea	United States	2:02.47	+4.89	
15	10	O	Chiharu Nozaki	Japan	2:02.78	+5.20	
16	8	O	Aki Tonoike	Japan	2:02.84	+5.26	
17	7	O	Anette Tønsberg	Norway	2:03.03	+5.45	
18	11	I	Tonny de Jong	Netherlands	2:03.19	+5.61	
19	10	I	Tatyana Trapeznikova	Russia	2:03.25	+5.67	
20	8	I	Varvara Barysheva	Russia	2:03.34	+5.76	
21	13	I	Mie Uehara	Japan	2:03.37	+5.79	
22	9	O	Barbara de Loor	Netherlands	2:04.05	+6.47	
23	9	I	Shiho Kusunose	Japan	2:04.38	+6.80	
24	14	I	Ingrid Liepa	Canada	2:04.60	+7.02	
25	3	O	Baeg Eun-bi	South Korea	2:05.23	+7.65	
26	4	O	Lee Gyeong-nam	South Korea	2:05.59	+8.01	
27	3	I	Krisztina Egyed	Hungary	2:05.79	+8.21	
28	5	I	Song Li	China	2:05.98	+8.40	
29	13	O	Isabelle Doucet	Canada	2:06.45	+8.87	
30	1	I	Emese Dörfler-Antal	Austria	2:07.57	+9.99	
31	6	O	Li Xuesong	China	2:08.05	+10.47	
32	2	I	Ilonda Lūse	Latvia	2:08.71	+11.13	
33	2	O	Svitlana Konstantynova	Ukraine	2:08.76	+11.18	
34	5	O	Mihaela Dascălu	Romania	2:08.77	+11.19	
