= Anke Reschwam Schulze =

German cross-country skier (born 1972)

Personal information
- Nationality: Germany
- Born: 8 December 1972 (age 53) Bautzen, East Germany

Sport
- Sport: Skiing
- Club: SC Willingen

World Cup career
- Seasons: 14 – (1993–2006)
- Indiv. starts: 126
- Indiv. podiums: 0
- Team starts: 30
- Team podiums: 2
- Overall titles: 0 – (22nd in 1997)
- Discipline titles: 0
Medal record
Women's cross-country skiing
Representing Germany
Junior World Championships
Silver medal – second place	1992 Vuokatti	15 km freestyle

Anke Reschwam Schulze (born 8 December 1972) is a German cross-country skier who has competed since 1992. Competing in two Winter Olympics, she finished fifth in the 4 × 5 km relay at Nagano in 1998 and had her best individual finish of tenth in the sprint event at Salt Lake City in 2002.

Schulze's best finish at the FIS Nordic World Ski Championships was seventh in the 5 km + 10 km combined pursuit at Trondheim in 1997. Her best World Cup finish was eighth in a 10 km event in Japan in 1997.

Schulze earned four individual victories at lesser events up to 10 km from 1997 to 2004.

== Cross-country skiing results ==
All results are sourced from the International Ski Federation (FIS).

=== Olympic Games ===
Year	Age	5 km	10 km	15 km	Pursuit	30 km	Sprint	4 × 5 km relay	Team sprint
1998	25	37	—N/a	38	31	26	—N/a	5	—N/a
2002	29	—N/a	—	35	—	—	10	—	—N/a

=== World Championships ===
Year	Age	5 km	10 km	15 km	Pursuit	30 km	Sprint	4 × 5 km relay	Team sprint
1993	20	48	—N/a	—	40	47	—N/a	10	—N/a
1995	22	25	—N/a	25	10	—	—N/a	5	—N/a
1997	24	11	—N/a	20	7	DNF	—N/a	6	—N/a
1999	26	53	—N/a	—	33	—	—N/a	—	—N/a
2001	28	—N/a	—	—	68	CNX^{[a]}	37	—	—N/a
2005	32	—N/a	20	—N/a	41	—	—	—	—

a. ^{1} Cancelled due to extremely cold weather.

=== World Cup ===
==== Season standings ====
Season	Age					
Season	Age	Overall	Distance	Long Distance	Middle Distance	Sprint
1993	21	NC	—N/a	—N/a	—N/a	—N/a
1994	22	57	—N/a	—N/a	—N/a	—N/a
1995	23	30	—N/a	—N/a	—N/a	—N/a
1996	24	28	—N/a	—N/a	—N/a	—N/a
1997	25	22	—N/a	NC	—N/a	20
1998	26	73	—N/a	NC	—N/a	71
1999	27	59	—N/a	NC	—N/a	60
2000	28	52	—N/a	NC	46	41
2001	29	47	—N/a	—N/a	—N/a	28
2002	30	45	—N/a	—N/a	—N/a	27
2003	31	45	—N/a	—N/a	—N/a	28
2004	32	49	40	—N/a	—N/a	40
2005	33	50	39	—N/a	—N/a	42
2006	34	61	51	—N/a	—N/a	62

==== Team podiums ====
- 2 podiums

No.	Season	Date	Location	Race	Level	Place	Teammates
1	2003–04	7 February 2004	La Clusaz, France	4 × 5 km Relay C/F	World Cup	2nd	Henkel / Bauer / Künzel
2	2004–05	21 November 2004	Gällivare, Sweden	4 × 5 km Relay C/F	World Cup	3rd	Böhler / Sachenbacher / Künzel
