= Matthias Looß =

German Nordic combined skier (born 1975)

Matthias Looß (born August 17, 1975) is a German Nordic combined skier who competed from 1996 to 2001. At the 1998 Winter Olympics in Nagano, he finished sixth in the 4 x 5 km team event.

Looß's best World Cup finish was eighth on three occasions at various distances in 1997 and 1998. He earned three individual career victories from 1996 to 2001, all in World Cup B events.
