= Marnix ten Kortenaar =

Austrian speed skater

Personal information
- Nationality: Austrian
- Born: 19 August 1970 (age 56) Voorburg, Netherlands

Sport
- Sport: Speed skating

Marnix ten Kortenaar (born 19 August 1970) is an Austrian speed skater. He competed in three events at the 1998 Winter Olympics.
