= Constanze Blum =

German cross-country skier (born 1972)

Personal information
- Nationality: Germany
- Born: 29 October 1972 (age 53)

Sport
- Sport: Skiing
- Club: SC Motor Zella-Mehlis

World Cup career
- Seasons: 9 – (1993–2001)
- Indiv. starts: 65
- Indiv. podiums: 0
- Team starts: 14
- Team podiums: 0
- Overall titles: 0 – (29th in 1998)
- Discipline titles: 0

Constanze Blum (born 29 October 1972) is a German cross-country skier who competed from 1993 to 2003. At the 1998 Winter Olympics in Nagano, she earned her best career finish of fifth in the 4 x 5 km relay and her best individual finish of 21st in the 15 km event.

Blum's best finish at the FIS Nordic World Ski Championships was 17th in the 30 km event at Thunder Bay, Ontario in 1995. Her best World Cup finish was sixth in a 15 km event in Japan in 1995.

Blum earned eight individual career victories at lesser events up to 15 km from 1996 to 2000.

== Cross-country skiing results ==
All results are sourced from the International Ski Federation (FIS).

=== Olympic Games ===
Year	Age	5 km	15 km	Pursuit	30 km	4 × 5 km relay
1998	26	30	21	26	31	5

=== World Championships ===
Year	Age	5 km	15 km	Pursuit	30 km	4 × 5 km relay
1995	23	57	—	35	17	—
1997	25	31	22	24	42	6
1999	27	—	23	—	24	—

=== World Cup ===
==== Season standings ====
Season	Age				
Season	Age	Overall	Long Distance	Middle Distance	Sprint
1993	21	NC	—N/a	—N/a	—N/a
1994	22	69	—N/a	—N/a	—N/a
1995	23	37	—N/a	—N/a	—N/a
1996	24	66	—N/a	—N/a	—N/a
1997	25	27	36	—N/a	29
1998	26	29	25	—N/a	33
1999	27	46	39	—N/a	43
2000	28	66	36	—	—
2001	29	NC	—N/a	—N/a	—
