= Susanne Busch =

German speed skater

Personal information
- Nationality: German
- Born: 9 October 1970 (age 54); Erfurt, East Germany

Sport
- Sport: Short track speed skating

Susanne Busch (born 9 October 1970) is a German short track speed skater. She competed in three events at the 1998 Winter Olympics.
