= Chris Witty =

American cyclist and speed skater

Personal information
- Full name: Christine Diane Witty
- Born: June 23, 1975 (age 51) West Allis, Wisconsin, U.S.
- Height: 167 cm (5 ft 6 in)
- Weight: 66 kg (146 lb)

Sport
- Country: United States
- Sport: Track cycling Speed skating
Medal record
Women's speed skating
Representing the United States
Olympic Games
| Gold medal – first place | 2002 Salt Lake City | 1000 m |
| Silver medal – second place | 1998 Nagano | 1000 m |
| Bronze medal – third place | 1998 Nagano | 1500 m |
World Single Distance Championships
| Bronze medal – third place | 2000 | 1000 m |
| Gold medal – first place | 1998 | 1000 m |
| Silver medal – second place | 1996 | 1000 m |
- Updated on September 6, 2014

Christine Diane Witty (born June 23, 1975) is an American speed skater and racing cyclist and participated in the Olympic Games in both sports.

She won medals at both 1000 and 1500 meters in the 1998 Winter Olympics. In 2002, she won the Olympic gold medal at the 1000 meters in Salt Lake City, setting a world record in the process.

In 1996 she became World Champion Sprint, in 1997 and 1998 she became second and in 2000 she became third.

In 1998 she won the gold medal at the World Single Distance Championships at the 1000 m, in 1996 the silver and in 2000 the bronze medal at the same distance.

In 2000, she placed fifth overall in the 500 m cycling time trials at the 2000 Summer Olympics in Sydney, becoming only the ninth American ever to compete in both the Summer and Winter Olympic Games.

In 2006, she was elected by her teammates to carry the United States flag at the 2006 Winter Olympics in Turin.

== Personal life ==
Witty has reported that she had experienced childhood abuse from a trusted neighbor, Clarence Platteler, since she was 4 till the age of 11 years, and she kept the secret for years. Witty currently lives with her partner, former Dutch long track speed skater Frouke Oonk.

== Records ==
Personal records
Speed skating
| Event | Result | Date | Location | Notes |
| 500 m | 38.36 | 2002-02-14 | Salt Lake City, Utah | |
| 1000 m | 1:13.83 | 2002-02-17 | Salt Lake City, Utah | |
| 1500 m | 1:55.71 | 2002-02-20 | Salt Lake City, Utah | |
| 3000 m | 4:22.57 | 1998-03-14 | Heerenveen | |
| 5000 m | 7:38.20 | 1998-03-15 | Heerenveen | |

Source: SpeedskatingResults.com

| Event | Time | Date | Venue |
|---|---|---|---|
| 1000 m | 1:15.43 | November 23, 1997 | Calgary |
| 1000 m | 1:14.96 | March 28, 1998 | Calgary |
| 1000 m | 1:14.58 | March 3, 2001 | Calgary |
| 1000 m | 1:13.83 | February 17, 2002 | Salt Lake City |

Source: SpeedSkatingStats.com

Witty holds the 1000m Olympic Record with a time of 1:13.83 which was set at the 2002 Olympic Winter games in the Utah Olympic Oval, Salt Lake City, Utah.

== Achievements ==
- 1996 World Sprint Championships: gold
- 1996 World Single Distance Championships, 1000 m: silver
- 1997 World Sprint Championships: bronze
- 1998 World Sprint Championships: bronze
- 1998 Olympic Winter Games, 1000 m: silver
- 1998 Olympic Winter Games, 1500 m: bronze
- 1998 World Single Distance Championships, 1000 m: gold
- 2000 World Sprint Championships: bronze
- 2000 World Single Distance Championships, 1000 m: bronze
- 2002 Olympic Winter Games, 1000 m: gold

She competed in track cycling in the 2000 Summer Olympics, where she placed 5th in the 500m time trial.

Olympic Games
| Preceded by Dawn Staley | Flagbearer for United States; Torino 2006 | Succeeded by Lopez Lomong |
