= Remi Hereide =

Norwegian speed skater

Personal information
- Born: 25 March 1973 (age 53) Bergen, Norway

Sport
- Sport: Speed skating

Remi André Hereide (born 25 March 1973) is a Norwegian speed skater. He was born in Bergen. He competed at the 1998 Winter Olympics in Nagano, where he placed 12th in the 5,000 m and 15th in the 10,000 m.

He was Norwegian champion on 5000 meter in 1997 and 1998, an on 10,000 meter in 1997, 1998 and 1999.
