= Netherlands at the 1998 Winter Olympics =

- Flag of the Netherlands
- IOC code: NED
- NOC: Dutch Olympic Committee*; Dutch Sports Federation
- Website: www.nocnsf.nl (in Dutch)

in Nagano
- Competitors: 22 (10 men, 12 women) in 3 sports
- Flag bearer (opening): Carla Zijlstra (Speed skating)
- Flag bearer (closing): Gianni Romme (Speed skating)
- Medals Ranked 6th: Gold 5 Silver 4 Bronze 2 Total 11

Winter Olympics appearances (overview)
- 1928; 1932; 1936; 1948; 1952; 1956; 1960; 1964; 1968; 1972; 1976; 1980; 1984; 1988; 1992; 1994; 1998; 2002; 2006; 2010; 2014; 2018; 2022; 2026

Athletes from the Netherlands competed at the 1998 Winter Olympics in Nagano, Japan.

== Medalists ==
Medal	Name	Sport	Event
Gold	Ids Postma	Speed skating	Men's 1000 metres
Gold	Gianni Romme	Speed skating	Men's 5000 metres
Gold	Gianni Romme	Speed skating	Men's 10,000 metres
Gold	Marianne Timmer	Speed skating	Women's 1000 metres
Gold	Marianne Timmer	Speed skating	Women's 1500 metres
Silver	Jan Bos	Speed skating	Men's 1000 metres
Silver	Ids Postma	Speed skating	Men's 1500 metres
Silver	Rintje Ritsma	Speed skating	Men's 5000 metres
Silver	Bob de Jong	Speed skating	Men's 10,000 metres
Bronze	Rintje Ritsma	Speed skating	Men's 1500 metres
Bronze	Rintje Ritsma	Speed skating	Men's 10,000 metres

== Competitors ==
The following is the list of number of competitors in the Games.

Sport	Men	Women	Total
Short track speed skating	1	4	5
Snowboarding	1	0	1
Speed skating	8	8	16
Total	10	12	22

== Short track speed skating ==
Men

Event	Athlete	Heat		Quarterfinal		Semifinal		Final	
Event	Athlete	Time	Position	Time	Position	Time	Position	Time	Position
500 m	Dave Versteeg	44.358	1 Q	43.377	1 Q	43.850	3 QB	42.933	6
1000 m	Dave Versteeg	1:32.748	3	Did not advance					

Women

Event	Athlete	Heat		Quarterfinal		Semifinal		Final	
Event	Athlete	Time	Position	Time	Position	Time	Position	Time	Position
500 m	Anke Jannie Landman	47.090	4	Did not advance					
500 m	Melanie de Lange	48.598	3	Did not advance					
500 m	Ellen Wiegers	56.250	3	Did not advance					
1000 m	Anke Jannie Landman	2:08.819	3 ADV	1:32.939	3	Did not advance			
1000 m	Ellen Wiegers	1:37.775	2 Q	1:36.343	3	Did not advance			
3000 m relay	Anke Jannie Landman; Melanie de Lange; Ellen Wiegers; Maureen de Lange					4:28.018	3 QB	4:26.592	6

== Snowboarding ==
Men

Event	Athlete	Round 1		Round 2		Final	
Event	Athlete	Time	Rank	Time	Rank	Time	Rank
Giant slalom	Thedo Remmelink	1:02.01	15	1:05.24	8	2:07.25	10

== Speed skating ==
Men

Event	Athlete	Race 1		Race 2		Final	
Event	Athlete	Time	Rank	Time	Rank	Time	Rank
500 m	Jan Bos	36.66	20	36.11	6	1:12.77	12
500 m	Jakko Jan Leeuwangh	36.69	23	36.54	21	1:13.23	21
500 m	Ids Postma	1:18.68	41	37.81	37	1:56.49	38
500 m	Erben Wennemars	35.96	5	DNF	–	DNF	–
1000 m	Jan Bos					1:10.71	2nd place, silver medalist(s)
1000 m	Martin Hersman					1:12.00	12
1000 m	Jakko Jan Leeuwangh					1:11.26	4
1000 m	Ids Postma					1:10.64 OR	1st place, gold medalist(s)
1500 m	Jan Bos					1:49.75	4
1500 m	Martin Hersman					1:50.31	6
1500 m	Ids Postma					1:48.13	2nd place, silver medalist(s)
1500 m	Rintje Ritsma					1:48.52	3rd place, bronze medalist(s)
5000 m	Bob de Jong					6:31.37	4
5000 m	Rintje Ritsma					6:28.24	2nd place, silver medalist(s)
5000 m	Gianni Romme					6:22.20 WR	1st place, gold medalist(s)
10,000 m	Bob de Jong					13:25.76	2nd place, silver medalist(s)
10,000 m	Rintje Ritsma					13:28.19	3rd place, bronze medalist(s)
10,000 m	Gianni Romme					13:15.33 WR	1st place, gold medalist(s)

Women

Event	Athlete	Race 1		Race 2		Final	
Event	Athlete	Time	Rank	Time	Rank	Time	Rank
500 m	Andrea Nuyt	39.62	15	1:18.32	37	1:57.94	37
500 m	Marianne Timmer	39.12	9	39.03	7	1:18.15	6
500 m	Marieke Wijsman	40.22	26	40.57	28	1:20.79	24
500 m	Sandra Zwolle	39.98	20	39.88	19	1:19.86	17
1000 m	Annamarie Thomas					1:17.95	5
1000 m	Marianne Timmer					1:16.51 OR	1st place, gold medalist(s)
1000 m	Marieke Wijsman					1:20.02	20
1000 m	Sandra Zwolle					1:19.25	15
1500 m	Tonny de Jong					2:03.19	18
1500 m	Barbara de Loor					2:04.05	22
1500 m	Annamarie Thomas					1:59.29	6
1500 m	Marianne Timmer					1:57.58 WR	1st place, gold medalist(s)
3000 m	Tonny de Jong					4:19.54	16
3000 m	Annamarie Thomas					4:14.38	8
3000 m	Carla Zijlstra					4:16.43	9
5000 m	Tonny de Jong					7:12.77	5
5000 m	Barbara de Loor					7:11.81	4
5000 m	Carla Zijlstra					7:12.89	6
