= Frank Dittrich =

German speed skater

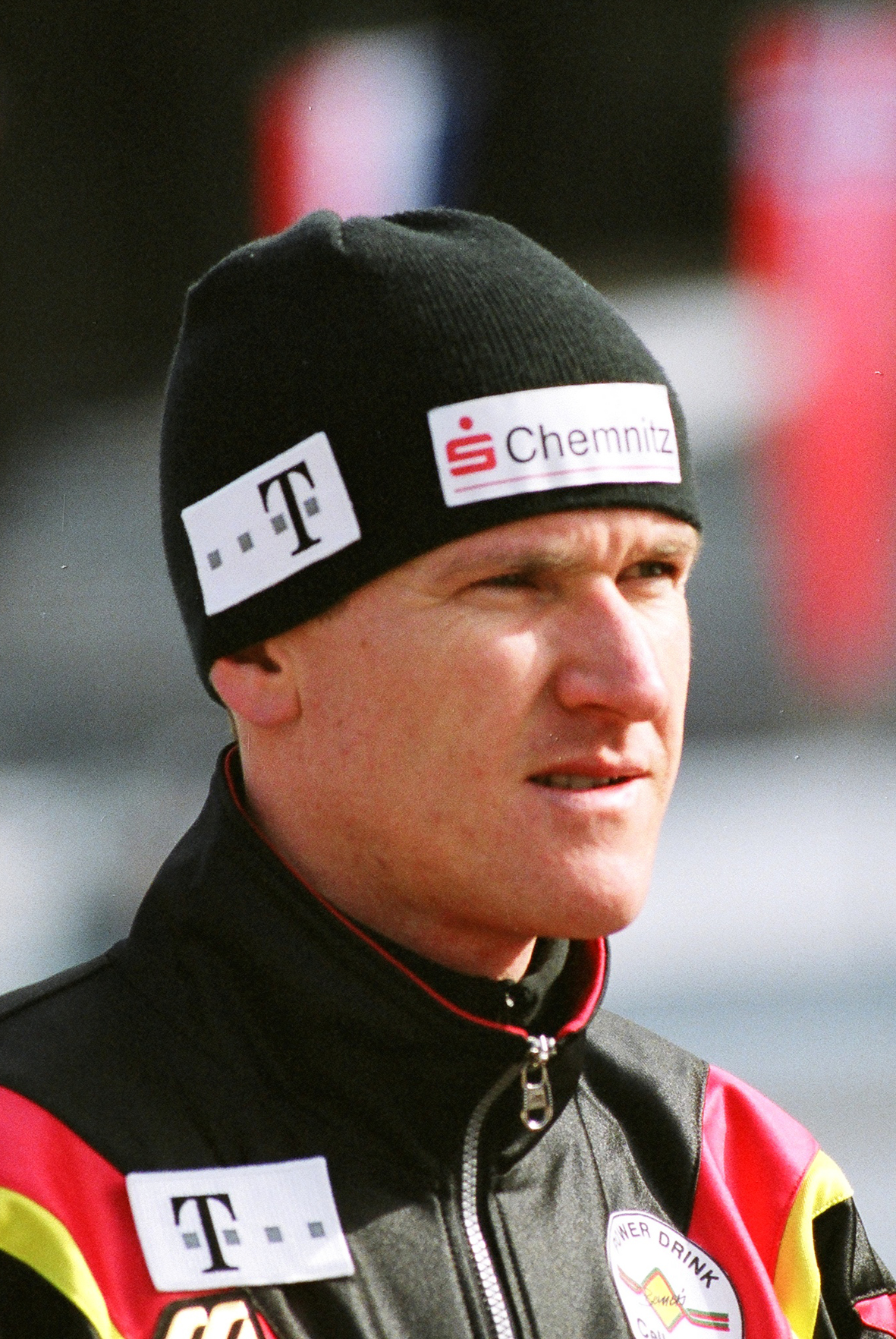

Personal information
- Nationality: German
- Born: 23 December 1967 (age 58) Leipzig, East Germany
- Height: 1.89 m (6 ft 2 in)
- Weight: 74 kg (163 lb)

Sport
- Country: East Germany; Germany
- Sport: Speed skating
- Turned pro: 1988
- Retired: 2004

Achievements and titles
- Personal bests: 500 m: 38.41 (2000); 1000 m: 1:19.71 (2000); 1500 m: 1:50.89 (2000); 3000 m: 3:48.86 (2002); 5000 m: 6:25.78 (2000); 10 000 m: 13:19.09 (2001)
Medal record
Representing Germany
World Championships
Bronze medal – third place	1997 Nagano	Allround

Frank Dittrich (born 23 December 1967) is a German former speed skater. His specialties were the stayer distances.

== Biography ==
Frank Dittrich was an medal winning skater on the stayer distances 5000 and 10,000 meters. During several World Single Distance Championships for Men Dittrich won five bronze medals, he also won a bronze medal at the World Championships Allround of 1997 in Nagano.

== Personal bests ==
Personal records
Men's Speed skating
Event	Result	Date	Location	Notes
500 m	38.41	22 January 2000	Calgary	
1,000 m	1.19,71	10 February 1990	Berlin	
1,500 m	1.50,89	22 January 2000	Calgary	
3,000 m	3.48,86	2 February 2002	Salt Lake City	
5,000 m	6.25,78	30 January 2000	Calgary	
10,000 m	13.19,09	11 March 2001	Salt Lake City	

== Result ==
Year	European Allround	Olympics	World Distance	World Allround
1990	-		-	16th
1991	-		-	
1992	13th	4th 5000m 20th 10000m	-	NC 21
1993	NC 17		-	NC 26
1994	NC 19	8th 5000m 6th 10000m	-	NC 20
1995	NC14		-	10th
1996	6th		5th 5000m (bronze) 10000m bronze	10th
1997	6th		(bronze) 5000m 8th 10000m	3rd place, bronze medalist(s)
1998	-	33rd 1500m 5th 5000m 6th 10000m	6th 5000m (bronze) 10000m	8th
1999	8th		5th 5000m (bronze) 10000m	10th
2000	16th		4th 5000m (bronze) 10000m	8th
2001	12th		6th 5000m 4th 10000m	12th
2002	14th	43rd 1500m 9th 5000m 10th 10000m	-	-
2003	-		9th 10000m	-
2004	-		11th 5000m 6th 10000m	-

- = No participation
# NC = not qualified for the final distance, but as # listed in the final ranking

Source: SpeedSkatingStats.com

== Medals ==
Championship	Gold medal	Silver medal	Bronze medal
European Allround	0	0	0
Olympics	0	0	0
World Distance	0	0	5
World Allround	0	0	1
