= Alexander Baumgärtel =

German speed skater

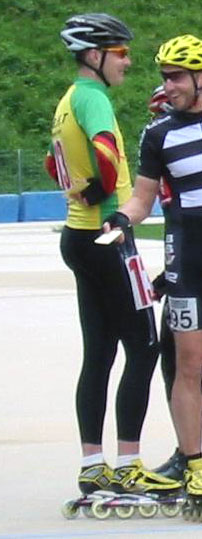
- Alexander Baumgärtel in 2005.

Personal information
- Nationality: German
- Born: 28 September 1972 (age 52); Saint Petersburg, Russia

Sport
- Sport: Speed skating

Alexander Baumgärtel (born 28 September 1972) is a German speed skater. He competed at the 1994 Winter Olympics and the 1998 Winter Olympics.
