= René Taubenrauch =

German speed skater

Personal information
- Nationality: German
- Born: 31 January 1974 (age 51); Erfurt, East Germany

Sport
- Sport: Speed skating

René Taubenrauch (born 31 January 1974) is a German speed skater. He competed at the 1998 Winter Olympics and the 2002 Winter Olympics.
