= Kirstin Holum =

American speed skater

Kirstin Holum CFR
Personal information
- Born: June 29, 1980 (age 46) Waukesha, Wisconsin, United States
- Height: 1.57 m (5 ft 2 in)
- Weight: 57 kg (126 lb)

Sport
- Sport: Speed skating
- Club: Northbrook Speedskating Club

Kirstin Holum, CFR (born June 29, 1980) is a retired American speed skater and member of the Franciscan Sisters of the Renewal.

Holum was born to the Olympic skier Mike Devecka and Olympic speed skater Dianne Holum, who coached her through entire career. In 1997, Kirstin won the World Junior All-Around Championships and set three national records on the 3000 m distance. Next year, she competed in the 3000 m and 5000 m events at the 1998 Winter Olympics and finished in sixth and seventh place, respectively.

Afterwards, she retired from skating and graduated in arts from a college in Baltimore with a thesis on art and the Olympics. She then joined the Franciscan Sisters of the Renewal, a religious order helping poor and homeless people. Later she moved to Leeds, England, where she became known as Sister Catherine at St. Joseph’s Convent.
