= Tonny de Jong =

Dutch speed skater (born 1974)

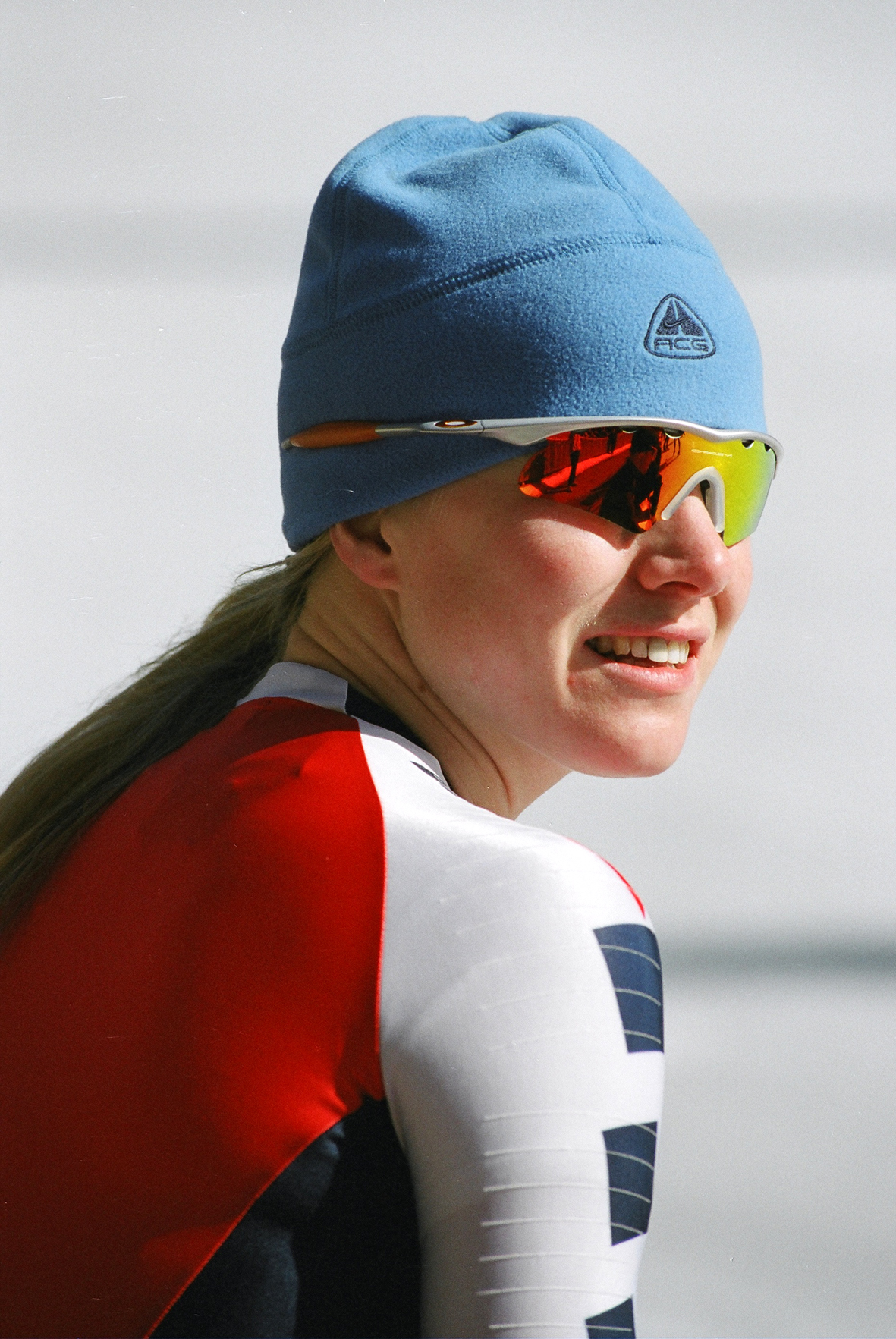
- Tonny de Jong

Personal information
- Born: 17 July 1974 (age 52) Scharsterbrug, Netherlands

Sport
- Country: Netherlands
- Sport: Speed skating
- Turned pro: 1995
- Retired: 2003
Medal record
Women's speed skating
Representing the Netherlands
World Allround Championships
Bronze medal – third place	1997	Allround
Bronze medal – third place	1999	Allround
World Single Distance Championships
Silver medal – second place	1999	3000 m
Bronze medal – third place	1999	1500 m
Bronze medal – third place	1999	5000 m
Bronze medal – third place	2000	5000 m
European Championships
Gold medal – first place	1997	Allround
Gold medal – first place	1999	Allround
Bronze medal – third place	1995	Allround
Dutch Allround Championships
Gold medal – first place	1997	Allround
Gold medal – first place	1998	Allround
Gold medal – first place	2001	Allround
Silver medal – second place	1995	Allround
Silver medal – second place	1996	Allround
Silver medal – second place	2000	Allround
Dutch Sprint Championships
Bronze medal – third place	1999	Sprint
Dutch Single Distance Championships
Gold medal – first place	2001	1500 m
Gold medal – first place	1996	3000 m
Gold medal – first place	1997	3000 m
Gold medal – first place	1998	3000 m
Gold medal – first place	2001	3000 m
Gold medal – first place	1996	5000 m
Gold medal – first place	2001	5000 m
Silver medal – second place	1998	1000 m
Silver medal – second place	2000	1000 m
Silver medal – second place	1993	1500 m
Silver medal – second place	1994	1500 m
Silver medal – second place	1998	1500 m
Bronze medal – third place	1997	1500 m
Bronze medal – third place	2000	1500 m
Silver medal – second place	2000	3000 m
Silver medal – second place	1993	5000 m
Silver medal – second place	1994	5000 m
Silver medal – second place	1997	5000 m

Tonny de Jong (born 17 July 1974) is a former Dutch speed skater, who was raised in Heerenveen and now lives in Calgary with Canadian speed skater Mark Knoll, whom she married in 2003.

She won three Dutch Allround Championships and numerous gold medals on the 3000 m and the 5000 m at the Dutch Single Distance Championships. In 1997 and 1999 she became European Allround Champion. De Jong was the first skater who mastered the clap skate.

At the 2002 Winter Olympics she had little success, but she did appear in a nude pictorial in the March issue of the Dutch Playboy. After the following World Allround Championships she ended her speedskating career.

== Medals ==
An overview of medals won by de Jong at important championships she participated in, listing the years in which she won each:

Championships	Gold medal	Silver medal	Bronze medal
Winter Olympics			
World Allround			1997; 1999
World Sprint			
World Single Distance		1999 (3000 m)	1999 (1500 m); 1999 (5000 m); 2000 (5000 m)
World Cup	1997 (3000 / 5000 m)	1997 (1500 m)	1999 (1500 m)
European Allround	1997; 1999		1995
Dutch Allround	1997; 1998; 2001	1995; 1996; 2000	
Dutch Sprint			1999
Dutch Single Distance	1996 (3000 m); 1996 (5000 m); 1997 (3000 m); 1998 (3000 m); 2001 (1500 m); 2001 (3000 m); 2001 (5000 m)	1993 (1500 m); 1993 (5000 m); 1994 (1500 m); 1994 (5000 m); 1997 (5000 m); 1998 (1000 m); 1998 (1500 m); 2000 (1000 m); 2000 (3000 m)	1997 (1500 m); 2000 (1500 m)

== Personal records ==
To put these personal records in perspective, the last column (WR) lists the official world records on the dates that de Jong skated her personal records.

Distance	Time	Date	Venue	WR
500 m	39.36	27 January 2002	Calgary	37.22
1000 m	1:16.23	21 February 1999	Calgary	1:14.96
1500 m	1:56.02	20 February 2002	Salt Lake City	1:54.38
3000 m	4:00.49	10 February 2002	Salt Lake City	3:59.26
5000 m	7:01.17	23 February 2002	Salt Lake City	6:52.44
Small combination	163.497	10 January 1999	Heerenveen	163.020

De Jong has an Adelskalender score of 160.231. Her highest ranking on the Adelskalender was a 3rd place.

Awards
Preceded by Ingrid Haringa	Dutch Sportswoman of the Year; 1997	Succeeded by Marianne Timmer
