= Orders, decorations, and medals of South Korea =

The South Korean honors system includes orders of merit, medals of honor, and commendations conferred by the South Korean government onto its citizens and foreigners.

== History ==
Korea's first modern system of orders was established under the Korean Empire. On April 17, 1900, Imperial Ordinance No. 13 promulgated the Regulations on Decorations, initially creating four orders. Three additional orders were introduced between 1901 and 1907. The system was administered by the Pyohoonwon (표훈원), a government office responsible for orders, medals, and related honors, and ceased following the annexation of Korea by Japan in 1910.

Following the establishment of the Republic of Korea in 1948, the present national honors system began on April 27, 1949, when Presidential Decree No. 82 established the Order of Merit for National Foundation. The government subsequently established the Grand Order of Mugunghwa and other orders through separate presidential decrees.

On December 14, 1963, the Awards and Decorations Act was enacted to consolidate the separate decrees governing individual orders into a unified statutory framework. The act took effect on March 1, 1964. Subsequent amendments reorganized the types, names, and grades of orders and medals into the present system.

== Orders ==
Orders (Korean: 훈장; Hanja: 勳章) are given by the president of South Korea to people who "rendered distinguished services" to the country. The first honor, the Grand Order of Mugunghwa, was established in 1949.

- Grand Order of Mugunghwa
- Order of Merit for National Foundation
- Order of Civil Merit
- Order of Military Merit
- Order of Service Merit
- Order of National Security Merit
- Order of Diplomatic Service Merit
- Order of Industrial Service Merit
- Order of Saemaeul Service Merit
- Order of Cultural Merit
- Order of Sports Merit
- Order of Science and Technology Merit

== Medals of Honour ==
Medals of Honour (Korean: 포장; Hanja: 襃章 are given by the president of South Korea to people who "rendered distinguished services" to the country. This is the second class.

- National Foundation Medal
- Civil Merit Medal
- Military Merit Medal
- Service Merit Medal
- National Security Medal
- Reserve Forces Medal
- Diplomatic Service Medal
- Industrial Service Medal
- Sarmaeul Service Medal
- Cultural Merit Medal
- Sports Merit Medal
- Science and Technology Medal
- Talent Medal of Korea (No longer awarded)

== Commendations ==
Commendations (Korean: 표창; Hanja: 表彰) are given to people by the president of South Korea, prime minister of South Korea, or various government ministries in recognition of acts of public service or excellence in certain fields.

=== Presidential Citation ===
Presidential Citation is awarded to individuals and organizations

Examples for organizations: MS Jutlandia (as a meaning of medical organization) and Presidential Unit Citation.

=== Prime Minister's Citation ===
Prime Minister's Citation is awarded to individuals and organizations

=== Minister of Culture, Sports and Tourism Citation ===
Minister of Culture, Sports and Tourism Citation is awarded to individuals and organizations

=== Presidential Award ===
Presidential Award is awarded to individuals and organizations

=== Prime Minister's Award ===
Prime Minister's Award is awarded to individuals and organizations

== Others ==
- Korean War Service Medal
- Medal for Participation in Vietnam War (No longer awarded)
- Gulf War Participation Medal (No longer awarded)
- Medal for 10 Years Faithful Service
- Medal for 20 Years Faithful Service
- Medal for 30 Years Faithful Service
- Guerrilla Service Medal
- Overseas Peacekeeping Medal
- 10th Anniversary of Republic of Korea Army Medal (No longer awarded)
- 20th Anniversary of Republic of Korea Army Medal (No longer awarded)
- 30th Anniversary of Republic of Korea Army Medal (No longer awarded)
- 40th Anniversary of Republic of Korea Army Medal (No longer awarded)
- New Knowledge Worker of Korea
- New Knowledge Farmer of Korea
- Korean Master Hand

=== by the Commissioner General of the National Police Agency ===
- Police 20 Years Long Service Medal

== See also ==
- Orders, decorations, and medals of the Korean Empire
- Government of South Korea
- Orders, decorations, and medals of North Korea
