= 2011 World Single Distance Speed Skating Championships – Women's 3000 metres =

The Women's 3000m race of the 2011 World Single Distance Speed Skating Championships was held on March 10 at 16:30 local time.

== Results ==
Rank	Pair	Lane	Name	Country	Time	Time Behind	Notes
1st place, gold medalist(s)	8	i	Ireen Wüst	Netherlands	4:01.56		TR
2nd place, silver medalist(s)	11	i	Martina Sáblíková	Czech Republic	4:02.07	+0.51	
3rd place, bronze medalist(s)	10	o	Stephanie Beckert	Germany	4:04.28	+2.72	
4	10	i	Jilleanne Rookard	United States	4:05.80	+4.24	
5	9	i	Eriko Ishino	Japan	4:06.88	+5.32	
6	5	o	Diane Valkenburg	Netherlands	4:07.01	+5.45	
7	9	o	Jorien Voorhuis	Netherlands	4:08.10	+6.54	
8	7	i	Claudia Pechstein	Germany	4:08.11	+6.55	
9	8	o	Cindy Klassen	Canada	4:09.46	+7.90	
10	4	i	Mari Hemmer	Norway	4:09.60	+8.04	
11	6	i	Ida Njåtun	Norway	4:11.57	+10.01	
12	6	o	Shiho Ishizawa	Japan	4:12.12	+10.56	
13	11	o	Brittany Schussler	Canada	4:13.90	+12.34	
14	4	o	Ivanie Blondin	Canada	4:14.55	+12.99	
15	7	o	Jennifer Bay	Germany	4:14.97	+13.41	
16	3	i	Anna Rokita	Austria	4:15.63	+14.07	
17	5	i	Luiza Złotkowska	Poland	4:16.15	+14.59	
18	2	i	Olga Graf	Russia	4:16.22	+14.66	
19	3	o	Cathrine Grage	Denmark	4:18.15	+16.59	
20	2	o	Ayaka Kikuchi	Japan	4:18.25	+16.69	
21	1	i	Natalia Czerwonka	Poland	4:23.48	+21.92	
