= Impact of Yuna Kim =

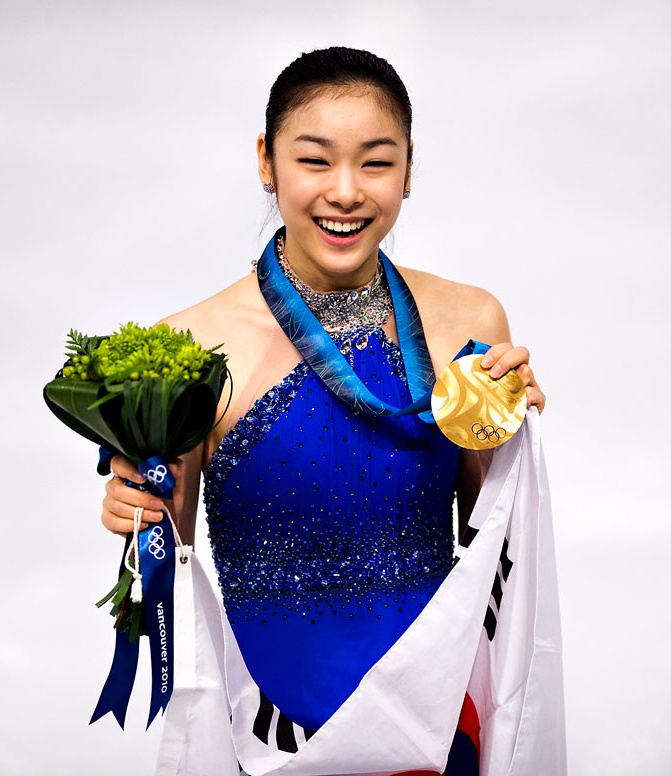
Yuna Kim at the 2010 Olympics

Yuna Kim, the retired South Korean competitive figure skater, also called "Queen Yuna" by figure skating fans and the press, has had an impact on the sport of figure skating, with her skating technique as an athlete and as an Olympic ambassador for both the 2014 and 2018 Olympic Winter Games. She was known for the "lighter-than-air grace in her movements on the ice", as well as her jumps, her speed, and her grounding in the demands of the ISU judging system, as well as her execution of her triple Lutz-triple toe loop combination jump, her "signature" layover camel spin (called the "Yuna Camel"), and her Ina Bauer. She trained with several coaches in her career, including Jong-hyun, Brian Orser, and Peter Oppegard. Her main choreographer was David Wilson, who helped her with her presentation skills and musicality. Kim was plagued with injuries throughout her career, which her training team tried to address, especially in the years leading up to the 2014 Olympics.

Kim was praised by reporters and by other members of the figure skating community for her artistry; she had "no rival in terms of artistry" and music was as important a part of her skating as her elements were. As early as 2005, it was reported that Kim's success boosted the popularity of figure skating in South Korea, where she was called "Queen Yuna". In 2010, she was the highest paid athlete at the 2014 Olympics. Her rivalry with Japanese skater Mao Asada was called "the best thing going in skating these days".

Kim was instrumental in bringing the Olympics to Pyeongchang in 2018 and has been involved with the International Olympic Committee since 2010. She has received numerous awards and honours, and has been featured in several lists, including the Time 100 in 2010 and in Forbes lists between 2010 and 2018.

== Skating technique ==
Kim was known for the "lighter-than-air grace in her movements on the ice", as well as her jumps, her speed, and her grounding in the demands of the ISU judging system (IJS). According to Michelle Kwan, whom Kim said was her biggest influence early in her career, competition judges were looking for Kim's skating abilities "when it comes to jump quality, spin quality and edges".

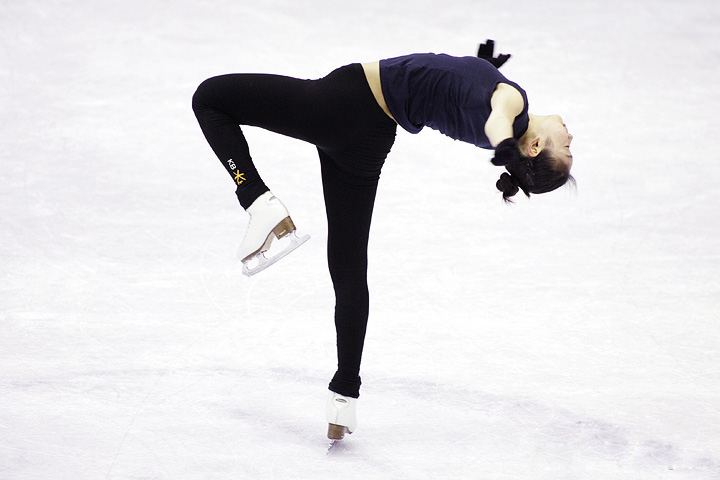
Kim performs a bent-leg layover camel spin during practice at the 2008–2009 Grand Prix Final.

In 2008, Kim told reporter Barry Mittan that she had tried triple axels, but had not yet landed any clean ones and had not attempted the jump during competition. Her grace and technical prowess was demonstrated, especially at the Vancouver Olympics, in her execution of her triple Lutz-triple toe loop combination jumps and her "signature" layover camel spin, also called the "Yuna Camel". American skater Timothy Goebel called Kim "very special" and praised her skating for its quality and ease, her landings for their light and effortless nature, and her jumps for their power and speed. One of Kim's signature moves, the bent-leg layover camel spin, has been called the "Yuna camel".

According to the Associated Press (AP) in 2009, Kim skated with ease, lightness, speed, power, and strength. Unlike other skaters, she did not slow down as she approached her jumps, going into them with full speed, but landing "as if she's touching down on a pillow". The AP also stated that her edge quality was high and that "she carves the ice like a calligrapher". In 2020, U.S. Olympic gold medallist Scott Hamilton stated that Kim was the best model of how to earn the most points under the IJS, especially her component scores. He added that Kim "skates with much more speed (than her leading competitors. Her jumps have great technique and beautiful landing positions. She does gorgeous spiral sequences with great flexibility".

=== Training ===
During Kim's junior years, South Korea had limited facilities for figure skaters. In an October 2010 interview with CNN, she pointed out that there were not many ice rinks in Korea, and that the few rinks that existed were public. She went on to add, "Even now, when athletes want to practice, they have to use the rink very early [in the] morning or late at night". The scarcity of facilities meant that skaters were often forced to alternate between rinks, and there was an increased risk of injury due to the cold temperatures. Her coach used a harness to teach her how to jump a triple toe loop.

Early in Kim's skating career, her parents were her most important financial support. Her monthly training costs averaged 2 million South Korean won (US$2,253.65), which included renting an ice rink in Gwacheon, near her family's home north of Seoul, and hiring instructors at home, plus the cost of hiring professionals such as choreographers outside of South Korea. At the time, South Korea had not invested, other than in short-track speed skating and a few other sports, in figure skating as much as other Asian countries had, but after she won the gold medal at the 2004 JGP Budapest, the Korea Skating Union awarded Kim with a grant of 1 million South Korean won (US$853.57). After winning the 2005 Junior Grand Prix final, the Korea Skating Union pledged to support Kim's training expenses.

In 2005, Kim trained for six hours a day, which included four hours on the ice and two hours for ballet and other kinds of training. The Korea Skating Union allowed her to train for two hours a day at the ice ring in Taeneung, the only rink in Korea not open to the public, which was also used by hockey teams and a few other figure skaters. She also trained at the rink in Gwacheon, which her parents rented for two hours per day, but was unable to use it until the rink closed for the public at 10 pm, so her training would often end at 1 or 2 am. She received regular massages for her pain and injuries, which her coach, Ryu Jong-hyun, considered "almost routine" in figure skating. In 2005, Korea JoongAng Daily reported that Kim strained a ligament in her right ankle, but did not take a break in her training, receiving treatment for the injury at the same time, although the level of her training was adjusted. She also injured her other ankle shortly afterwards, but continued her training as well, although she did not practice several jumps. In 2007, it was reported that Kim was in constant pain in her ankles due to "her strong jumping ability". Shortly before the Junior Grand Prix Final in 2005, which she won, she experienced significant pain that spread to her waist and knees, from new skates purchased two weeks before the competition. Korean news outlet KBS Global considered her Grand Prix win an example of Kim's ability to overcome obstacles" and of her invincible determination".

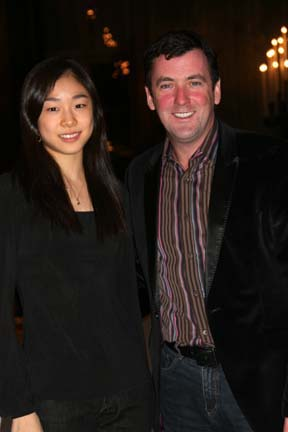
Kim with her coach Brian Orser in 2007

By 2006, Kim wanted more freedom, so she went to Toronto that summer to work with choreographer David Wilson. Juliet Macur of The New York Times called it "the turning point of her career". Kim began training with Brian Orser at the Toronto Cricket, Skating and Curling Club in the summer of 2006 and then moved, with her mother, to Toronto in May 2007 to train with him year-round. At first, Orser declined to be Kim's coach, but eventually agreed. She told a reporter in 2008 that the training environment in Toronto was "very good" and that she and Orser "had a lot in common". She also said that she liked how Orser coached, how he explained jumps and elements to her, and the way he asked for her input. Orser reported that he and Kim had a good rapport and communicated well with each other. According to Macur, Kim gravitated towards Orser due to his "laid-back style and his perspective".

Macur reported that when Kim relocated to Toronto, she "was 15, a gangly, socially awkward, newly minted junior world champion with braces on her teeth", and who spoke no English. According to Wilson, despite her technical abilities, Kim was dispirited both as a skater and as a person and was plagued with ankle and knee injuries. Wilson told Macur that Kim's team, which included Orser, Wilson, and "a team of specialists", helped her accept "quality over quantity and worked to make her laugh". It took her a month after her arrival before she began to smile. In 2010, she said that although both Toronto and Los Angeles, where she trained after her break with Orser in 2010, had large Korean communities, she missed being around her friends and family in Korea.

Orser reported in 2008 that they had worked on improving Kim's many injuries, which included inflammation in her S1 joint, a tear in the tendon attached to her hip bone that was probably an overuse injury, and an injury to her coccyx. Orser said her injuries were the reason he thought no one had seen her at her best the previous few seasons and that his goal was "to get it fixed because we can't go through this every year". The summer before the season was spent treating her injuries by using acupuncture and alternative medicine in order to avoid surgery. Before training in Toronto, she would go through six pairs of skates per year, which Orser suspected contributed to her hip injury when she was younger, but she found good boots the year before they began working together and only used three boots per year going forward.

In 2010, Orser told Macur that Kim was able to lead a more "normal life", without the great fame she experienced in South Korea. She was able to train with "the ease of anonymity", and as Orser put it, "focus on what she has to do". Macur called Orser "a perfect coach for Kim" because like her, he and his co-coach, former Canadian ice dancer Tracy Wilson, understood and had also experienced the pressure she went through, something Orser felt Kim was comforted by. Orser was made an honorary citizen of Seoul, Korea, in 2010; also in 2010, Michelle Ha, Kim's agent, called Orser "the most popular foreigner in Korea".

As of 2008, Kim trained on the ice six days a week, for two and a half hours per day, plus three hours daily off the ice, which included cardio, strength training, and "an intense warm-up before each session". She did a lot of core strength work, but not Pilates. In October 2007, she added ballet lessons with Evelyn Hart, a ballerina with the Royal Winnipeg Ballet. In 2009, she told Golden Skate that she liked to be "perfectly prepared", and that when she was, she felt that she was able to give a better performance. She also said that she tried to "express all of myself" in every performance. In 2011, Kim told CNN that she worked on her short program with Wilson, as well as her jumps, spins, and steps, and her free skating program with her then-coach Peter Oppengard. She did basic strength training during her off-ice training.

== Artistry ==
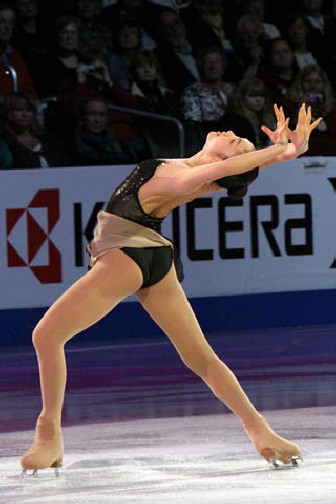
Kim performs a layback Ina Bauer at the 2009 World Championships

According to Bae Young-eun of Donga Ilbo, Kim had "no rival in terms of artistry". Music was as important a part of her skating as her elements were. Her choreographer David Wilson stated that Kim's ability to interpret the music she used in her programs was part of the reason for her success, adding that she was able to intrinsically hear music "on a level that rarely people do". Kim felt classical music fit her and liked to skate to it. In 2011, Kim told Philip Hersh of the Los Angeles Times that despite the pressure she felt as a skater, she did not compete to win competitions or for her country, but that she did it for herself, adding, "I am not skating just to win gold. I am skating for skating".

Michelle Kwan said about Kim: "Yuna is very rare...She has the speed, the beauty, the jumping, the footwork". British skater Robin Cousins praised what he called Kim's "across-the-board quality", adding that she had the "it factor" and that her skating had "a supreme serenity that has no arrogance in it". Philip Hersh of the Los Angeles Times said about Kim, after the Vancouver Olympics, "Never have athlete and artist been more perfectly balanced than they are with Kim. Never has a skater with both those qualities displayed them so flawlessly in the sport's most important competition". Hersh also stated that Kim had a "concealed" strength and that she was able to withstand a great deal of the pressure she experienced in South Korea. David Wilson noticed Kim's ability to command an arena at 2007 Worlds. "Yuna is a chameleon", stated Wilson, further adding that "She hears music on a level that rarely people do", acknowledging that part of the reason for Kim's success was her ability to interpret the music with her programs. In 2009, Kim said that acting on the ice was the most important thing for her, and that she loved performing in front of the audience. In 2011, Japanese skater and coach Yuka Sato called Kim "wonderful to watch" and "amazing technically", adding that Kim had "great speed", "major star quality", and "catches your eyes...like a magnet".

Kim excelled at earning extra points for her transitions before and after her jumps, which were "as smooth as water". While Dorothy Hamill said "she will be remembered as a great artist, but it is a different kind of artistry," she still praised Kim's 2010 Olympics free skate, saying she had "jaw-dropping magnificence", and that her skating was like "magic", later praising the "modernness" to her skating. Frank Carroll, who was Michelle Kwan's coach, said that Kim was able to combine athletics and artistry, despite it being "almost impossible" under the new judging system. For example, as Philip Hersh pointed out, the IJS did not give skaters the time to develop landmark moves by holding innovative positions or classical skating postures, but at the 2010 Olympics, Kim performed two of these moves, the spread eagle and Ina Bauer, but she used them as brief transitions into jump combinations. Hersh stated, "The impression they left is not of breathtaking artistry but of the athletic command needed to handle the extra difficulty the moves add to the ensuing jumps". New York Post columnist Mike Vaccaro said that "watching Yuna Kim skate is like watching Michael Jordan play basketball".

=== Collaboration with David Wilson ===
David Wilson initially began working with Kim as her choreographer prior to the 2006–07 season, shortly after her 2006 Junior World Championship title. Kim had wanted to work with Wilson for the 2004–05 season, but he declined because he did not know her and because had been contacted too late in the season, so Kim worked with Wilson's former student, former figure skater and choreographer Jeffrey Buttle, instead. When Kim contacted Wilson again two years later, Sébastien Britten, who had been working with junior skaters at the time and was one of Wilson's first students, recommended her to Wilson and he accepted her as his student. Buttle had told him that Kim was unhappy both as a person and as a skater, calling her "not a very happy skater", so Wilson had "very low expectations" and made it his mission to make her smile and to connect with her. Wilson later said that it was a challenge to connect with Kim because she expressed very little emotion and spoke almost no English; he spent the first three months getting Kim to smile and to laugh. As Jack Gallagher, a figure skating reporter from the Japan Times, stated, "Wilson made it his mission to bring Yuna out of her shell". In a 2009 interview, Kim said she did not take any special acting classes to enhance her choreography, but that she used Wilson's directions instead. Wilson choreographed all of Kim's competitive programs from the 2007–08 season until her retirement in 2014. He and Orser also choreographed Kim's Festa on Ice shows.

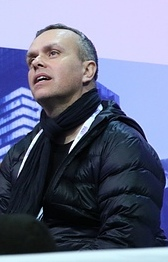
David Wilson, Kim's choreographer for most of her career

Wilson praised Kim's work ethic, noting that she "took everything [he] said to heart" and said that she believed in him, which was fulfilling, adding that she had never been rude or temperamental with him. He called her "an absolute dream" to work with. He also praised her integrity as a person. He later said that he helped her deal with the pressure she felt, advising her early in their collaboration that she needed to find a reason for skating other than winning, which he felt would protect her from all the pressure and expectations. In 2016, Wilson that Kim's team, which included himself, Orser, and Tracy Wilson, "turned Kim into a star" and that without his tutelage, she would not have been as professionally and financially successful. The 2010 Olympics was the first time he accompanied Kim at a competition and the first time he had attended an Olympic competition. He said that he tried to keep things "normal" during their time in Vancouver and to keep her laughing. He did not have coaching credentials, so he watched her skate from the stands with Kim's mother. He told Philip Hersh, "Every time she jumped, I was praying to my [late] mother in heaven to keep her upright. I was too rattled to enjoy it".

Wilson stated in 2018 that although Kim's split with Orser was one of the hardest things he experienced in his career, he chose to not let what happened affect his relationship with either Orser or Kim. He said he had tried to help them repair their relationship, but eventually realized that there was little he could do. He also said that he was heartbroken when Kim left Toronto.

== Impact on figure skating ==
As early as 2005, it was reported that Kim's success boosted the popularity of figure skating in South Korea, where she was called "Queen Yuna". As Philip Hersh stated shortly before the 2010 Olympics, no other figure skater was as celebrated as Kim was in her country. She was called South Korea's second greatest athlete, behind Olympic goal medal marathoner Sohn Kee-Chung and "one of the most iconic sports stars in Korea", and was considered South Korea's "daughter". In 2005, former skater and Kim's coach, Chi Hyun-jung, stated that Kim's success served as a turning point for skating in South Korea and expressed the hope that it would produce more competitors there. In 2020, her coach, Brian Orser, said that Kim's performances at the 2010 Olympics were among the greatest ever and that she inspired thousands of South Korean girls to take up figure skating. In 2003, when Kim won her first South Korean national title, eight senior women competed there; in 2020, 32 women competed as seniors and 24 competed as juniors at the South Korean Championships, and the highest nine senior women all performed a triple Lutz-triple toe loop combination in the free skate. The 2020 South Korean champion, You Young, stated in 2016 that Kim inspired her to become a figure skater.

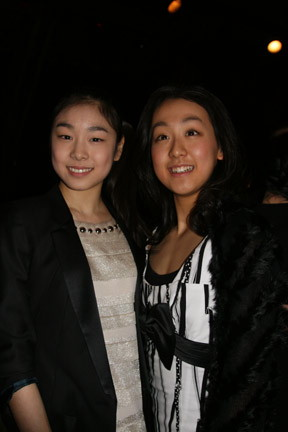
Kim and her "rival", Mao Asada, in 2008

In 2010, Orser said, about Kim's fame and popularity, "When you're with her in Korea, it's like you're traveling with Princess Diana; Yu-na's that famous there". Orser also stated that Kim was aware of her country's expectations of her and the difference she made there, especially to Korea's morale after the 2008 financial crisis. Kim said in 2010 that she was happy that she "played a small part in the popularity of the sport" in Korea. American skater Johnny Weir stated in 2009 that she had done a great deal for figure skating in Korea and that "she deserves every ounce of credit and adoration she gets". As International Figure Skating magazine stated in 2009, some felt that she was the invigoration the sport needed. Canadian skater Kurt Browning compared her to a tsunami, adding that when he watched her skate, he would think, "This is what figure skating should be" and said, "She makes me a fan of figure skating". In 2010, according to Forbes magazine, she was one of the highest paid athletes in the world.

=== Rivalry with Mao Asada ===
Kim and Japanese skater Mao Asada were called rivals since they competed as juniors. As Juliet Macur stated in The New York Times, Kim and Asada "grew up competing against each other, fueling one of the fiercest Japan versus Korea sports rivalries". In 2009, when Kim won the Worlds Championships and Asada came in second place, the Associated Press called their rivalry "the best thing going in skating these days" and stated that it was the reason for their fame in their respective countries.

According to Philip Hersh shortly before the 2010 Olympics, Kim and Asada's rivalry was about more than figure skating. As Hersh put it, most sports competitions between South Korea and Japan "had always been freighted with nationalistic implications" based upon a long and difficult history, going back to the 16th century, between the two neighbouring countries. Hersh stated that this history made, for the Koreans, beating the Japanese a matter of national pride and was also the source of the intense pressure Kim felt as she competed internationally. When asked about her rivalry with Asada in 2012, however, Klaus-Reinhold Kany of Ice Network reported that Kim was respectful towards Asada, stating that they "often competed against each other, but when we meet, everybody concentrates more on his own competition and does not always think of the other competitors".

== Olympic ambassador ==
In 2005, Kim was appointed a public relations ambassador by the South Korea Olympic Committee's unsuccessful bid to host the 2014 Olympics. In 2010, she was one of 24 Korean athletes chosen to serve on a committee to promote their bid for the 2018 Olympics.

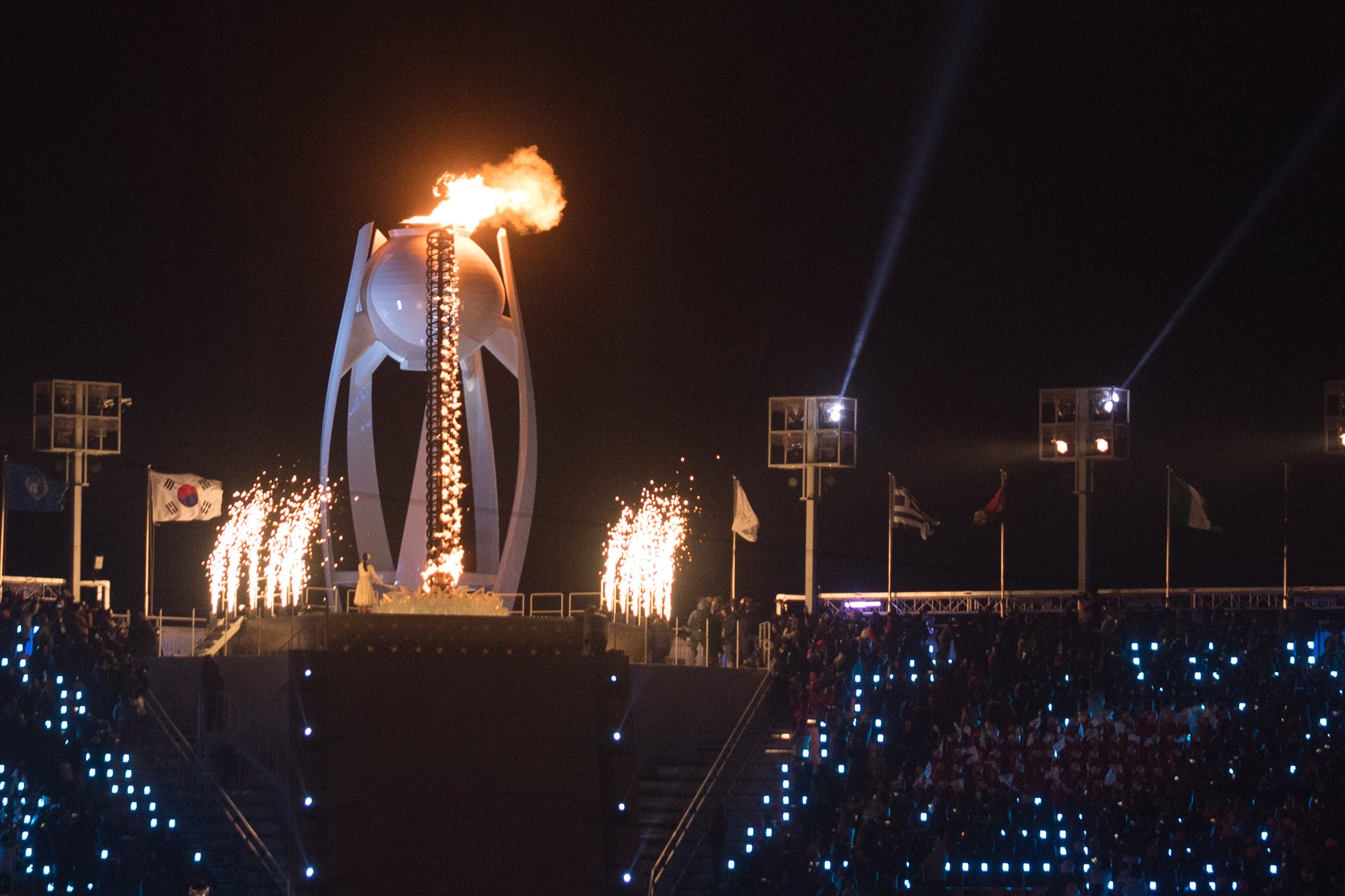
2018 Olympics opening ceremony, after Kim lit the Olympic cauldron

The Korean committee members, including Kim, traveled to Durban, South Africa, where the International Olympic Committee (IOC)'s decision for the hosting city was finalized on July 6, 2011. There, she fulfilled her role as a member of the Korean delegation by promoting Pyeongchang as an athlete ambassador and Olympic champion. Kim was one of the Korean delegates who appeared before the July 6 IOC conference and delivered a presentation for Pyeongchang, which won the hosting rights over the other rival cities, Munich, Germany, and Annecy, France and was later credited with helping Korea win the bid. Terrance Burns, a consultant for the Pyeongchang bid, said that Kim lent "athlete credibility" to their successful campaign. In October 2011, Kim was appointed a member of the 2018 Pyeongchang Olympic Winter Games Organising Committee.

On August 18, 2011, Kim was named a Global Ambassador for the Special Olympics and Goodwill Ambassador for the 2013 Special Olympics World Winter Games. In October, Kim was named an ambassador for the 2012 Winter Youth Olympics in Innsbruck. In 2012, Kim stated that she hoped to become a member of the IOC after the 2014 Sochi Games. On August 27, 2015, Kim was named an ambassador for the 2016 Winter Youth Olympics in Lillehammer.

Kim was named an official ambassador for the 2018 Winter Olympics in South Korea. She appeared as the final torch bearer and lit the Olympic flame in the Opening Ceremony. She later said that it took her breath away and that as an athlete, it was an honour. She also co-starred in Coca-Cola's 2018 Winter Olympics campaign with actor Park Bo-gum. In 2020, she was appointed an ambassador for the Pyeongchang 2018 Legacy Foundation's "Play Winter" campaign, designed to promote winter sports and continue the legacy of the Pyeongchang Olympics. She served as an instructor at the Play Winter Sports Academy, which used the Pyeongchang facilities in 2021 and 2022, teaching high level skating and presentation skills to develop young figure skaters' talents. In February 2022, she was named the honorary ambassador for the 2024 Winter Youth Olympics in Gangwon, South Korea. She was also appointed as a member of the Organising Committee.

== Awards and honours ==
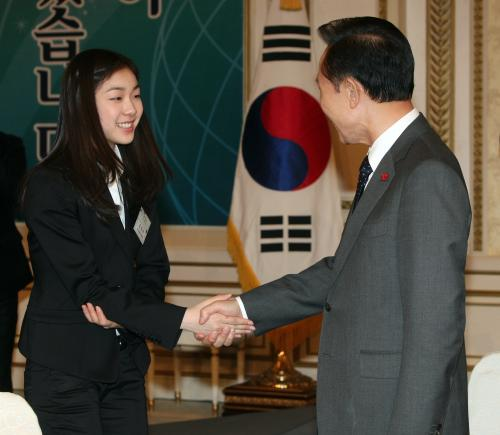
Kim with then South Korea president Lee Myung-bak at the Talent Award of Korea Ceremony, December 2008

Kim was honored in the sports category at the Republic of Korea National Assembly Awards in 2006, and received an Achievement Award in 2011. She was awarded the Talent Medal of Korea, which recognizes young people with leadership potential, in 2008. In 2008 and 2009, a major Korean newspaper named her Korea's "person of the year" and Gallup polls named her South Korea's top athlete in the three years preceding the 2010 Olympics. In August 2010, the city of Los Angeles designated August 7 as "Yu-Na Kim Day" and granted her honorary citizenship, and she also received the Proud Korean Award from the Korean American Leadership Foundation. Kim received the Sportswoman of the Year Award from the Women's Sports Foundation later that year.

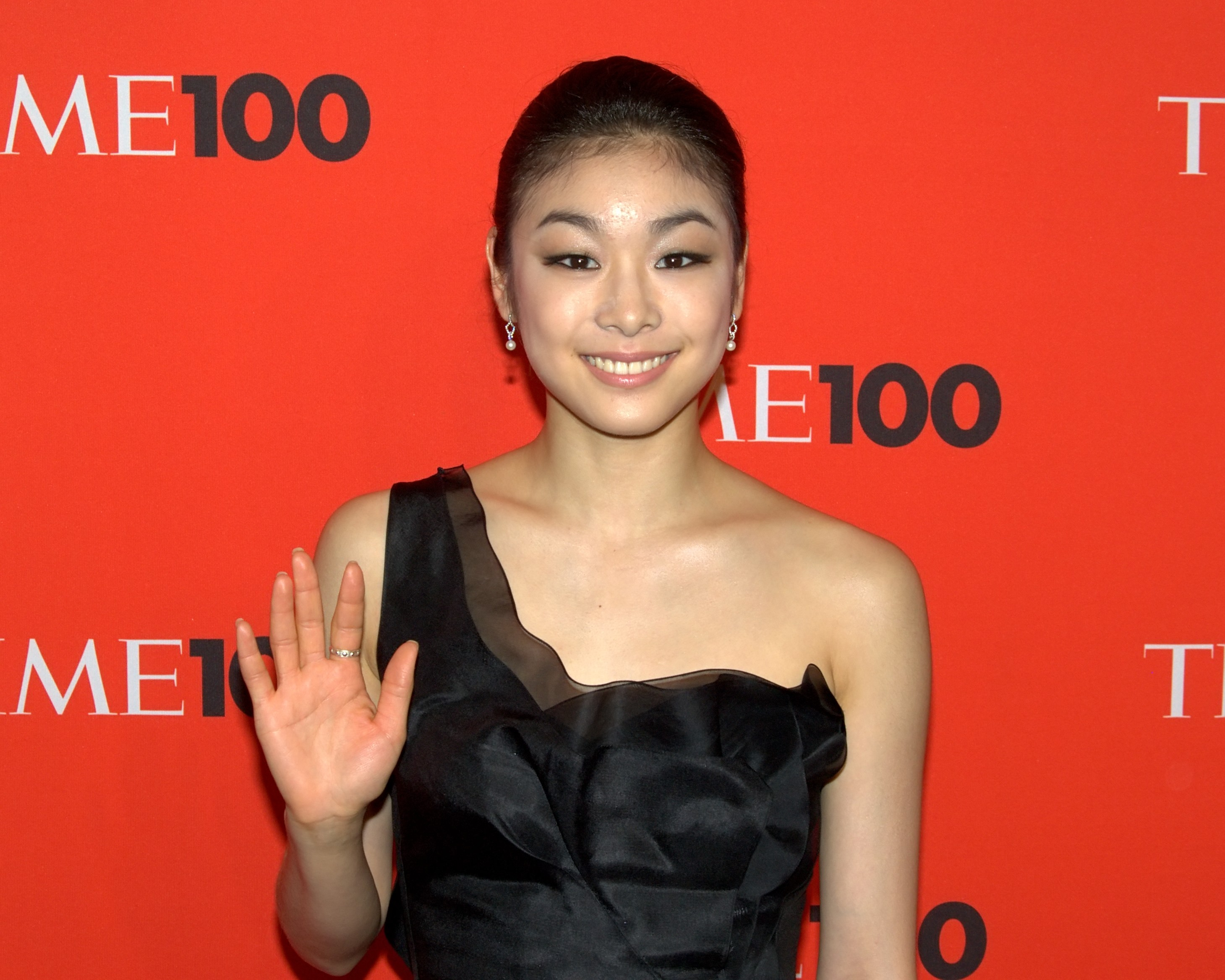
Kim at the 2010 Time 100 Gala

In 2012, Kim was awarded the Moran Medal of the Order of Physical Education, the second-highest grade in South Korea's Order of Civil Merit, for her contributions to the 2018 Pyeongchang bid. In 2013, she received an achievement award from her alma mater, Korea University, for "significantly raising the honor and dignity" of both the university and the country; she was also awarded her diploma during the ceremony because she was unable to attend her graduation ceremony due to her participation in the 2013 World Championships. She was later awarded the Blue Dragon Medal (Cheongnyong) at the 54th Korea Sports Awards, the highest decoration in the Order of Sports Merit, in October 2016. Kim was not originally eligible for the honor, having already received a different order less than seven years prior, but an exception was made in light of her achievements. She became the youngest and only winter sports athlete to be inducted into the Korean Sports Hall of Fame the subsequent month. Following the 2018 Winter Olympics, along with the unified women's ice hockey team of North and South Korea, she received the Outstanding Performance Award at the ANOC Awards. Kim received the Korea Image Cornerstone Award at the 19th Korea Image Awards alongside Squid Game actor Lee Jung-jae and swimmer Hwang Sun-woo on January 11, 2023.

Kim has been featured in various lists, including the Time 100 (2010) and Forbes 30 Under 30 (2016). In 2009, she was the first person to top the Forbes Korea Power Celebrity 40; she also topped the list in 2010 and appeared in the top 10 on five other occasions (2011–2012, 2014–2015, 2018).
