= Seounsan =

Mountain in South Korea

Coordinates: 36°56′N 127°18′E

Highest point
- Elevation: 547.7 m (1,797 ft)

Geography
- Location: South Korea

Korean name
- Hangul: 서운산
- Hanja: 瑞雲山
- RR: Seounsan
- MR: Sŏunsan

Seounsan (Korean: 서운산) is a mountain in South Korea. Its area extends across Anseong, Gyeonggi Province and Jincheon County, North Chungcheong Province. It has an elevation of 547.7 m (1,797 ft). Seounsan translates as "West Clouds Mountain". The Cheongryongsa or "Blue Dragon Temple" is located on the Southern slope of the mountain.

== See also ==
- List of mountains in Korea
