= 2011 World Single Distance Speed Skating Championships – Women's team pursuit =

The Women's team pursuit race of the 2011 World Single Distance Speed Skating Championships was held on March 13 at 15:30 local time.

== Results ==
Rank	Pair	Country	Athletes	Time	Deficit	Notes
1st place, gold medalist(s)	1	Canada	Christine Nesbitt; Brittany Schussler; Cindy Klassen	2:59.74		
2nd place, silver medalist(s)	4	Netherlands	Ireen Wüst; Diane Valkenburg; Marrit Leenstra	3:00.43	+0.69	
3rd place, bronze medalist(s)	3	Germany	Stephanie Beckert; Isabell Ost; Claudia Pechstein	3:01.82	+2.08	
4	2	Japan	Eriko Ishino; Masako Hozumi; Miho Takagi	3:03.20	+3.46	
5	3	Norway	Hege Bøkko; Ida Njåtun; Mari Hemmer	3:04.26	+4.52	
6	4	Russia	Yekaterina Lobysheva; Yekaterina Shikhova; Yevgenia Dmitrieva	3:05.28	+5.54	
7	2	Poland	Luiza Złotkowska; Natalia Czerwonka; Katarzyna Woźniak	3:06.30	+6.56	
8	1	United States	Heather Richardson; Jilleanne Rookard; Rebekah Bradford	3:10.76	+11.02	
