= Choi Hyung-sook =

South Korean activist and organizer

Choi Hyung-sook (Korean: 최형숙) is a South Korean activist and organizer for the rights of single mothers in South Korea. She is the founder and CEO of InTree, a support and advocacy organization for the improvement of the social status of single mothers in Korean society. InTree offers support services and runs a counselling centre, Spring Day, specifically for single mothers under 24 years old, out of a location in Bukchon Hanok Village in Seoul. In 2018, she received the President's Commendation from the Ministry of Gender Equality and Family for her work in promoting vulnerable families and creating a "family-friendly social culture". She was also involved in the push for the creation of Single Mother's Day, created in 2010 by various civic groups in South Korea. Choi is also a leader of the Korean Unwed Mothers Families Association (KUMFA).

Choi advocated for an amendment to the Single-Parent Family Support Act, first passed in 1989, to reduce the economic burden on single mothers; it has yet to pass after being proposed by assemblywoman Jung Choun-sook. Single parent families in South Korea with a monthly income 1.5 million won or less for a two-person household can receive a 200,000 won stipend from the government. However this is often insufficient to support themselves and a child, particularly giving rising costs in urban areas such as Seoul. Many single parents are unable to work as their education or career opportunities are curtailed due to pregnancy, childrearing, lack of affordable childcare, and the difficulty in job-seeking while caring for a child.

Choi has spoken out against South Korean president Yoon Suk-yeol's promise to abolish the Ministry of Gender Equality and Family.
