= 2015 World Single Distance Speed Skating Championships – Women's 5000 metres =

Women's 5000 metres at the 2015 World Single Distance Speed Skating Championships
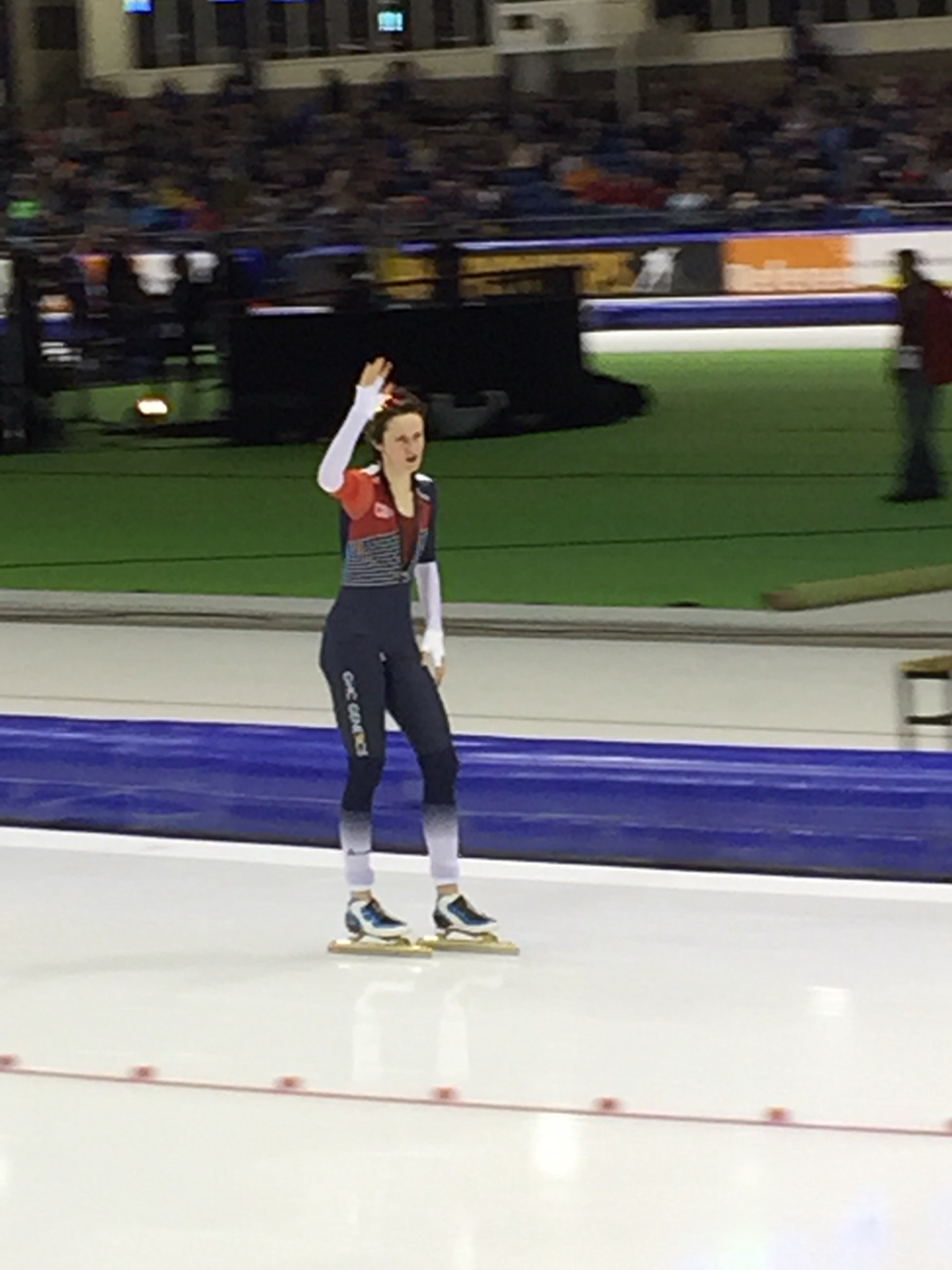
- Event winner Sáblíková
- Venue: Thialf, Heerenveen
- Date: 13 February 2015
- Competitors: 12 from 9 nations
- Winning time: 6:52.73

Medalists
| gold medal | Martina Sáblíková | Czech Republic |
| silver medal | Carlijn Achtereekte | Netherlands |
| bronze medal | Claudia Pechstein | Germany |

The Women's 5000 metres race of the 2015 World Single Distance Speed Skating Championships was held on 13 February 2015.

== Results ==
The race was started at 19:53.

| Rank | Pair | Lane | Name | Country | Time | Diff |
|---|---|---|---|---|---|---|
| 1st place, gold medalist(s) | 5 | o | Martina Sáblíková | CZE | 6:52.73 | |
| 2nd place, silver medalist(s) | 2 | i | Carlijn Achtereekte | NED | 6:54.49 | +1.76 |
| 3rd place, bronze medalist(s) | 6 | o | Claudia Pechstein | GER | 6:56.53 | +3.80 |
| 4 | 6 | i | Jorien Voorhuis | NED | 7:05.64 | +12.91 |
| 5 | 4 | o | Olga Graf | RUS | 7:07.89 | +15.16 |
| 6 | 5 | i | Ivanie Blondin | CAN | 7:08.97 | +16.24 |
| 7 | 2 | o | Anna Chernova | RUS | 7:13.71 | +20.98 |
| 8 | 3 | o | Stephanie Beckert | GER | 7:16.19 | +23.46 |
| 9 | 4 | i | Jelena Peeters | BEL | 7:17.28 | +24.55 |
| 10 | 1 | o | Shoko Fujimura | JPN | 7:19.44 | +26.71 |
| 11 | 1 | i | Maria Lamb | USA | 7:20.42 | +27.69 |
| 12 | 3 | i | Kim Bo-reum | KOR | 7:39.30 | +46.57 |
