= 2013 World Single Distance Speed Skating Championships – Women's 5000 metres =

Women's 5000 metres at the 2013 World Single Distance Speed Skating Championships
- Venue: Adler Arena, Sochi
- Date: 23 March 2013
- Competitors: 16 from 10 nations
- Winning time: 6:54.31

Medalists
| gold medal | Martina Sáblíková | Czech Republic |
| silver medal | Ireen Wüst | Netherlands |
| bronze medal | Claudia Pechstein | Germany |

The women's 5000 metres race of the 2013 World Single Distance Speed Skating Championships was held on 23 March at 17:35 local time.

== Results ==
| Rank | Pair | Lane | Name | Country | Time | Time behind | Notes |
|---|---|---|---|---|---|---|---|
| 1st place, gold medalist(s) | 7 | i | Martina Sáblíková | Czech Republic | 6:54.31 | | |
| 2nd place, silver medalist(s) | 5 | i | Ireen Wüst | Netherlands | 7:02.96 | +8.65 | |
| 3rd place, bronze medalist(s) | 7 | o | Claudia Pechstein | Germany | 7:04.07 | +9.76 | |
| 4 | 3 | o | Linda de Vries | Netherlands | 7:09.33 | +15.02 | |
| 5 | 8 | o | Stephanie Beckert | Germany | 7:09.35 | +15.04 | |
| 6 | 6 | o | Diane Valkenburg | Netherlands | 7:09.57 | +15.26 | |
| 7 | 3 | i | Bente Kraus | Germany | 7:09.82 | +15.51 | |
| 8 | 1 | o | Ivanie Blondin | Canada | 7:13.16 | +18.85 | |
| 9 | 8 | i | Olga Graf | Russia | 7:13.58 | +19.27 | |
| 10 | 5 | o | Masako Hozumi | Japan | 7:17.88 | +23.57 | |
| 11 | 2 | o | Maria Lamb | United States | 7:18.07 | +23.76 | |
| 12 | 6 | i | Jelena Peeters | Belgium | 7:20.54 | +26.23 | |
| 13 | 2 | i | Eriko Ishino | Japan | 7:24.20 | +29.89 | |
| 14 | 4 | o | Mari Hemmer | Norway | 7:26.80 | +32.49 | |
| 15 | 1 | i | Anna Rokita | Austria | 7:28.64 | +34.33 | |
| 16 | 4 | i | Cindy Klassen | Canada | 7:35.88 | +41.57 | |
