= 2011 World Single Distance Speed Skating Championships – Women's 5000 metres =

The Women's 5000m race of the 2011 World Single Distance Speed Skating Championships was held on March 12 at 15:25 local time.

== Results ==
| Rank | Pair | Lane | Name | Country | Time | Time Behind | Notes |
|---|---|---|---|---|---|---|---|
| 1st place, gold medalist(s) | 7 | o | Martina Sáblíková | Czech Republic | 6:50.83 | | |
| 2nd place, silver medalist(s) | 8 | i | Stephanie Beckert | Germany | 6:54.99 | +4.16 | |
| 3rd place, bronze medalist(s) | 5 | i | Claudia Pechstein | Germany | 7:00.90 | +10.07 | |
| 4 | 6 | i | Masako Hozumi | Japan | 7:03.14 | +12.31 | |
| 5 | 4 | o | Diane Valkenburg | Netherlands | 7:04.15 | +13.32 | |
| 6 | 7 | i | Jilleanne Rookard | United States | 7:05.71 | +14.88 | |
| 7 | 6 | o | Cindy Klassen | Canada | 7:07.52 | +16.69 | |
| 8 | 8 | o | Eriko Ishino | Japan | 7:10.66 | +19.83 | |
| 9 | 3 | o | Jorien Voorhuis | Netherlands | 7:10.73 | +19.90 | |
| 10 | 5 | o | Shiho Ishizawa | Japan | 7:11.81 | +20.98 | |
| 11 | 2 | o | Linda de Vries | Netherlands | 7:14.85 | +24.02 | |
| 12 | 1 | o | Luiza Złotkowska | Poland | 7:15.71 | +24.88 | |
| 13 | 3 | i | Mari Hemmer | Norway | 7:16.85 | +26.02 | |
| 14 | 4 | i | Katrin Mattscherodt | Germany | 7:18.01 | +27.18 | |
| 15 | 2 | i | Ivanie Blondin | Canada | 7:23.96 | +33.13 | |
| 16 | 1 | i | Ida Njåtun | Norway | 7:26.90 | +36.07 | |
