= List of Cambodian records in track cycling =

The following are the national records in track cycling in Cambodia, maintained by its national cycling federation, Cambodian Cycling Federation.

== Men ==
Event	Record	Athlete	Date	Meet	Place	Ref
Flying 200 m time trial						
Flying 500 m time trial						
500 m time trial	39.829	Seyha Yoeurn	19 October 2019	Asian Championships	Jincheon, South Korea	
Flying 1 km time trial						
1 km time trial	1:12.665	Seyha Yoeurn	19 October 2019	Asian Championships	Jincheon, South Korea	
Team sprint						
4000 m individual pursuit						
4000 m team pursuit						
Hour record						

== Women ==
Event	Record	Athlete	Date	Meet	Place	Ref
Flying 200 m time trial						
Flying 500 m time trial						
500 m time trial						
Flying 1 km time trial						
1 km time trial						
Team sprint						
3000 m individual pursuit						
3000 m team pursuit						
Hour record						
