= 2012 World Single Distance Speed Skating Championships – Women's 3000 metres =

The women's 3000 metres race of the 2012 World Single Distance Speed Skating Championships was held on March 22 at 16:30 local time.

== Results ==
Rank	Pair	Lane	Name	Country	Time	Time behind	Notes
1st place, gold medalist(s)	12	o	Martina Sáblíková	Czech Republic	4:01.88		
2nd place, silver medalist(s)	11	o	Stephanie Beckert	Germany	4:04.09	+2.21	
3rd place, bronze medalist(s)	10	i	Ireen Wüst	Netherlands	4:04.87	+2.99	
4	11	i	Claudia Pechstein	Germany	4:04.99	+3.11	
5	10	o	Linda de Vries	Netherlands	4:06.33	+4.45	
6	9	i	Cindy Klassen	Canada	4:07.14	+5.26	
7	8	o	Yevgeniya Dmitriyeva	Russia	4:09.51	+7.63	
8	8	i	Brittany Schussler	Canada	4:09.53	+7.65	
8	12	i	Diane Valkenburg	Netherlands	4:09.53	+7.65	
10	7	i	Olga Graf	Russia	4:09.90	+8.02	
11	5	o	Kim Bo-reum	South Korea	4:11.09	+9.21	
12	6	o	Park Do-yeong	South Korea	4:11.13	+9.25	
13	3	i	Natalia Czerwonka	Poland	4:11.27	+9.39	
14	5	i	Jilleanne Rookard	United States	4:11.93	+10.05	
15	9	o	Masako Hozumi	Japan	4:13.07	+11.19	
16	7	o	Eriko Ishino	Japan	4:13.42	+11.54	
17	4	i	Isabell Ost	Germany	4:15.05	+13.17	
18	2	i	Mari Hemmer	Norway	4:16.23	+14.35	
19	2	o	Anna Rokita	Austria	4:17.16	+15.28	
20	6	i	Shiho Ishizawa	Japan	4:17.84	+15.96	
21	4	o	Hege Bøkko	Norway	4:18.24	+16.36	
22	3	o	Nicole Garrido	Canada	4:20.13	+18.25	
23	1	i	Katarzyna Woźniak	Poland	4:22.42	+20.54	
24	1	o	Maria Lamb	United States	4:26.44	+24.56	
