= New Knowledge Farmer of Korea =

The New Knowledge Farmer of Korea (abbreviated to NKFK as the post-nominal) (Korean: 대한민국 신지식농업인) is a distinction and honorary title in the Republic of Korea awarded personally for exceptional achievements with new knowledge including new skills and ideas in agriculture. The New Knowledge Farmers had been conferred within the New Knowledge Worker of Korea award system, by National Commission for Rebuilding Korea (before 1999). Since 1999, The Ministry of Agriculture and Forestry started to separately award the honorary title to 'New Knowledge Farmers' and The Ministry for Food, Agriculture, Forestry and Fisheries of Korea after 2008.

The total number of New Knowledge Farmer recognitions, had been awarded by the Korean Government, is 336 in 2012.

== See also ==
- New Knowledge Worker of Korea
- Royal and noble styles
- Hero of Socialist Labour (USSR)
