= 2012 World Single Distance Speed Skating Championships – Women's 5000 metres =

The women's 5000 metres race of the 2012 World Single Distance Speed Skating Championships was held on March 24 at 12:00 local time.

== Results ==
Rank	Pair	Lane	Name	Country	Time	Time Behind	Notes
1st place, gold medalist(s)	7	i	Martina Sáblíková	Czech Republic	6:50.46		
2nd place, silver medalist(s)	8	i	Stephanie Beckert	Germany	6:56.64	+6.18	
3rd place, bronze medalist(s)	8	o	Claudia Pechstein	Germany	7:04.01	+13.55	
4	6	i	Olga Graf	Russia	7:10.22	+19.76	
5	2	i	Diane Valkenburg	Netherlands	7:13.61	+23.15	
6	4	o	Park Do-yeong	South Korea	7:13.74	+23.28	
7	5	i	Cindy Klassen	Canada	7:14.19	+23.73	
8	5	o	Annouk van der Weijden	Netherlands	7:15.84	+25.38	
9	3	o	Jorien Voorhuis	Netherlands	7:16.21	+25.75	
10	4	i	Ayaka Kikuchi	Japan	7:17.18	+26.72	
11	6	o	Masako Hozumi	Japan	7:17.75	+27.29	
12	7	o	Shiho Ishizawa	Japan	7:20.15	+29.69	
13	3	i	Bente Kraus	Germany	7:20.96	+30.50	
14	2	o	Yevgenia Dmitrieva	Russia	7:23.02	+32.56	
15	1	o	Brittany Schussler	Canada	7:24.79	+34.33	
16	1	i	Nicole Garrido	Canada	7:31.26	+40.80	
