= Claudia Pechstein =

German speed skater

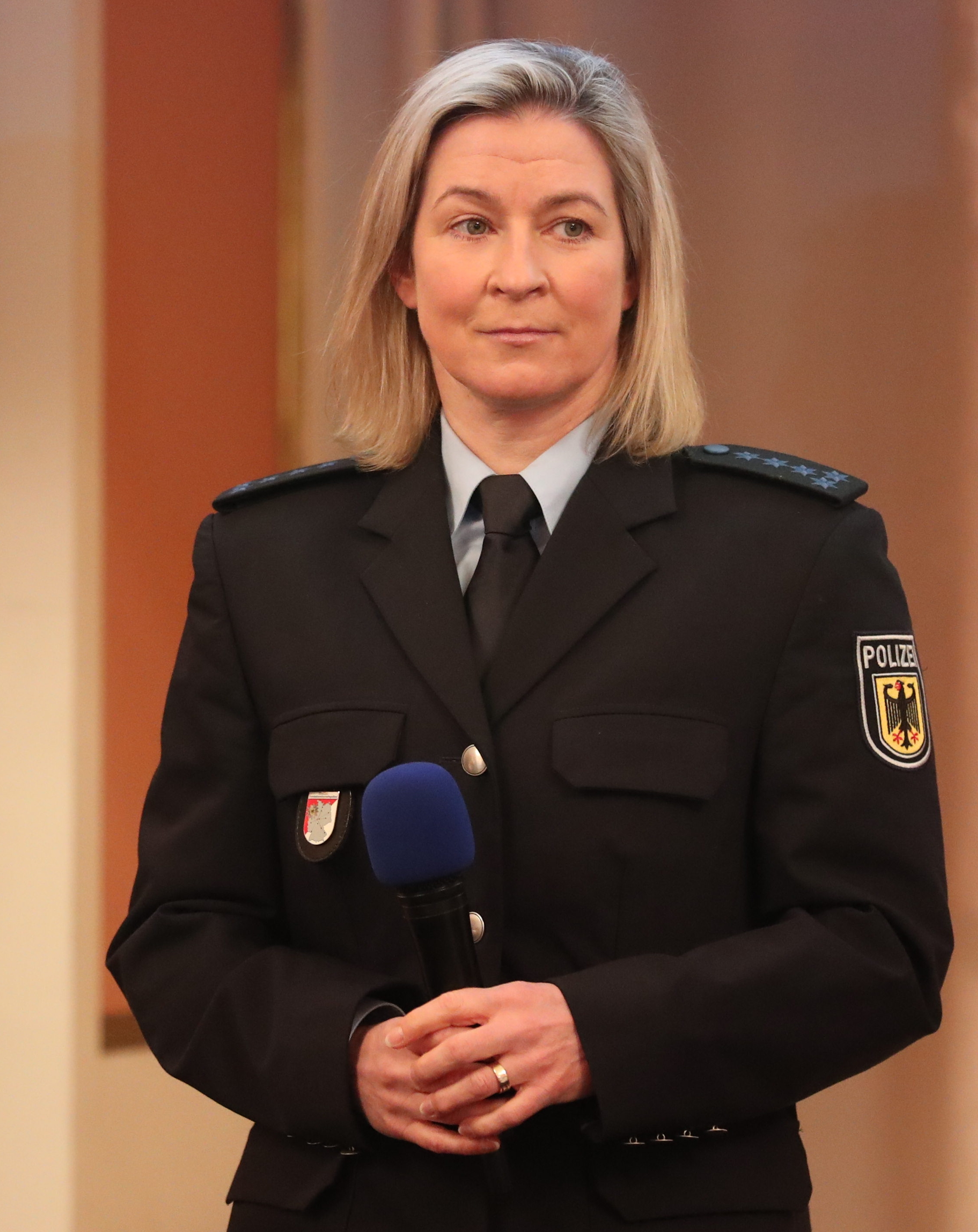
- Pechstein in 2022

Personal information
- Nationality: German
- Born: 22 February 1972 (age 54) East Berlin, East Germany

Sport
- Country: Germany (1990–); East Germany (1988–1990)
- Sport: Speed skating
- Turned pro: 1988
Medal record
Women's speed skating
Representing Germany
Olympic Games
Gold medal – first place	1994 Lillehammer	5000 m
Gold medal – first place	1998 Nagano	5000 m
Gold medal – first place	2002 Salt Lake City	3000 m
Gold medal – first place	2002 Salt Lake City	5000 m
Gold medal – first place	2006 Turin	Team pursuit
Silver medal – second place	1998 Nagano	3000 m
Silver medal – second place	2006 Turin	5000 m
Bronze medal – third place	1992 Albertville	5000 m
Bronze medal – third place	1994 Lillehammer	3000 m
World Championships
Gold medal – first place	1996 Hamar	5000 m
Gold medal – first place	2000 Nagano	1500 m
Gold medal – first place	2000 Nagano	3000 m
Gold medal – first place	2000 Milwaukee	Allround
Gold medal – first place	2003 Berlin	5000 m
Gold medal – first place	2004 Seoul	3000 m
Silver medal – second place	1996 Hamar	1500 m
Silver medal – second place	1996 Hamar	3000 m
Silver medal – second place	1996 Inzell	Allround
Silver medal – second place	1997 Nagano	Allround
Silver medal – second place	1998 Calgary	3000 m
Silver medal – second place	1998 Calgary	5000 m
Silver medal – second place	1998 Heerenveen	Allround
Silver medal – second place	1999 Heerenveen	3000 m
Silver medal – second place	1999 Heerenveen	5000 m
Silver medal – second place	1999 Hamar	Allround
Silver medal – second place	2000 Nagano	5000 m
Silver medal – second place	2001 Salt Lake City	5000 m
Silver medal – second place	2001 Budapest	Allround
Silver medal – second place	2003 Berlin	3000 m
Silver medal – second place	2003 Gothenburg	Allround
Silver medal – second place	2004 Hamar	Allround
Silver medal – second place	2005 Inzell	3000 m
Silver medal – second place	2005 Inzell	5000 m
Silver medal – second place	2006 Calgary	Allround
Silver medal – second place	2007 Salt Lake City	5000 m
Silver medal – second place	2017 Gangneung	5000 m
Bronze medal – third place	1998 Calgary	1500 m
Bronze medal – third place	1997 Warszawa	5000 m
Bronze medal – third place	2001 Salt Lake City	3000 m
Bronze medal – third place	2002 Heerenveen	Allround
Bronze medal – third place	2004 Seoul	5000 m
Bronze medal – third place	2005 Moscow	Allround
Bronze medal – third place	2007 Salt Lake City	Team pursuit
Bronze medal – third place	2008 Nagano	Team pursuit
Bronze medal – third place	2011 Inzell	5000 m
Bronze medal – third place	2011 Inzell	Team pursuit
Bronze medal – third place	2012 Heerenveen	5000 m
Bronze medal – third place	2013 Sochi	3000 m
Bronze medal – third place	2013 Sochi	5000 m
Bronze medal – third place	2015 Heerenveen	5000 m
European Championships
Gold medal – first place	1998 Helsinki	Allround
Gold medal – first place	2006 Hamar	Allround
Gold medal – first place	2009 Heerenveen	Allround
Silver medal – second place	1999 Heerenveen	Allround
Silver medal – second place	2001 Baselga di Piné	Allround
Silver medal – second place	2002 Erfurt	Allround
Silver medal – second place	2003 Heerenveen	Allround
Silver medal – second place	2004 Heerenveen	Allround
Silver medal – second place	2012 Budapest	Allround
Bronze medal – third place	1996 Heerenveen	Allround
Bronze medal – third place	2005 Heerenveen	Allround

Claudia Pechstein (German pronunciation: [ˈklaʊdi̯a ˈpɛçʃtaɪn]; born 22 February 1972) is a retired German speed skater. She has won five Olympic gold medals. With a total of nine Olympic medals, five gold, two silver, and two bronze, she was previously the most successful Olympic speed skater, male or female, of all time, (later superseded by Ireen Wüst during the 2018 Winter Olympics in PyeongChang). Pechstein is the most successful German Winter Olympian of all time. After the World Championships in Norway in February 2009, Pechstein was accused of blood doping and banned from all competitions for two years.

== Biography ==
Pechstein was born in East Berlin. She held a world record on the 5000 m track with the time 6:46.91 achieved on the Utah Olympic Oval in Salt Lake City on 23 February 2002, which was beaten by Martina Sáblíková on the same oval five years later. Pechstein is a sergeant in the German Federal Police and trains at the force's sports training centre at Bad Endorf.

Pechstein is the first female Winter Olympian to win medals in five consecutive Olympics (1992–2006); she won the gold medal in the women's 5000 metres race in three consecutive Olympics (1994, 1998, 2002), with bronze in the first (1992) and the silver medal in the fifth (2006). In the 3000 metres, she won three medals, gold (2002), silver (1998), and bronze (1994). She won her fifth Olympic gold medal in the team pursuit at the 2006 Winter Olympics in Turin. After missing the 2010 Vancouver Games, she made her sixth Olympic appearance at the 2014 Sochi Games, finishing fourth in the 3000 metres and fifth in the 5000 metres. In 2018 she appeared in the Pyeongchang Games.

As reported by Olympic news outlet Around the Rings, Pechstein is aiming for an Olympic return, this time as a cyclist. "I will start in the individual pursuit at the German Track Championships from 6 to 10 July in Berlin", she said. "I am also planning to race the individual sprint or the 500-meter time trial. I trust I can do this because as a skater I've trained a lot on the bike. I have nothing to lose. I don't know how this kind of competition works, so this alone is really exciting".

In 2022, she returned to the Olympic Games and was the German flag-bearer for the opening ceremony in Beijing. It was her eighth participation in the Olympic Winter Games and a new record for most Winter Olympics for a female athlete.

== Two-year ban for blood doping ==
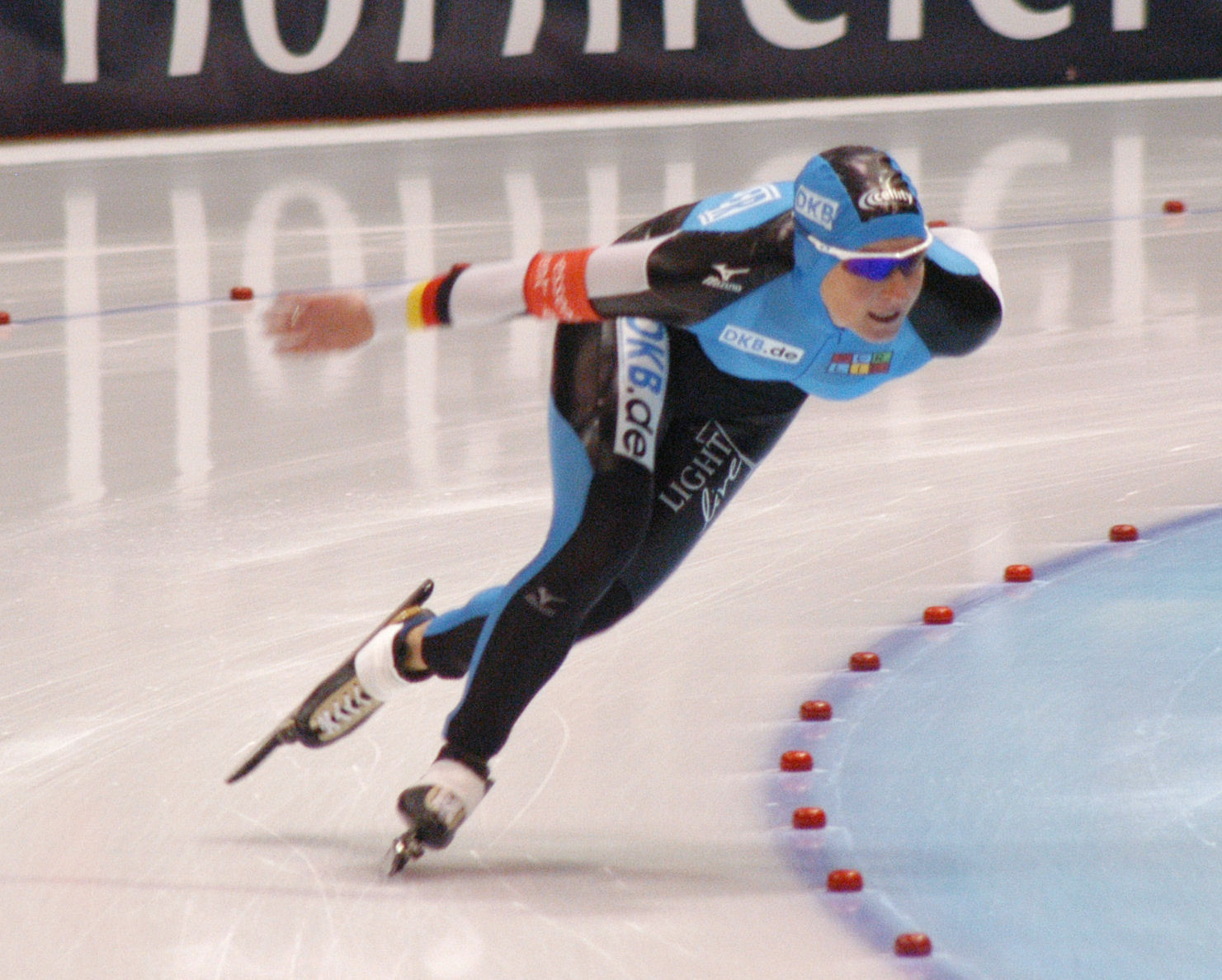
Pechstein in 2007

Chronology of the dispute involving Claudia Pechstein and the International Skating Union (ISU):
2009	ISU found the athlete guilty of violation of anti-doping provisions and imposed a two-year suspension the Court of Arbitration for Sport (CAS) confirmed the sanction
2010	the Swiss Federal Supreme Court dismissed the appeal against the CAS award the Swiss Federal Supreme Court rejected the request for judicial review filed by the athlete
2014	the Munich Regional Court affirmed its jurisdiction and partially upheld the claim against the ISU
2015	the Higher Regional Court of Munich partially confirmed the decision of the Munich Regional Court
2016	the Federal Court of Justice of Germany upheld the appeal filed by the ISU and recognized the jurisdiction of CAS; Claudia Pechstein lodged an application for review at the German Constitutional Court
2018	the ECHR rejected the application lodged by the athlete
2019	the ECHR rejected the request for referral to the Grand Chamber of the ECHR submitted by the athlete.

After the World Championships in Norway in February 2009, the International Skating Union accused Pechstein of blood doping and banned her from all competitions for two years. This ban was based on irregular levels of reticulocytes in her blood. These levels were highest during the Calgary World Cup 2007 and the Hamar World Championships in 2009; elevated levels were also found during a number of other competitions and training spot checks.

In "Autonomy and Biopower in the Anti-Doping Establishment: A Rogue Agent of Governmentality," sport historian Daniel Rosenke reviews Pechstein's case, citing it as an example of the contentious nature of the biological passport. After collecting sample data on the skater for a period of nearly nine years, the ISU banned Pechstein from competition for an above threshold fluctuation in reticulocyte percentage, a blood parameter used in passport profiling. Notably, Pechstein argued her ‘%Retics’ of 3.49 fell into the normal range for women her age and asserted that the International Skating Union’s (ISU) threshold limit of 2.4 was far too low, basing this claim on a confluence of data in medical science. Two weeks following the 3.49 reading, Pechstein was tested again at 1.37, a difference considered by the ISU to be an unequivocal sign of doping. To defend herself, Pechstein cast doubt upon the accuracy of the ‘%Retics’ measurement, citing both her hemoglobin and hematocrit levels as exculpatory evidence. In short, she questioned the reliability and accuracy of the entire procedure's longitudinal sample collection, which ultimately led to her violation of the ISU's anti-doping code. Finally, Pechstein interrogated the burden of proof to be met by the ISU in proving a doping violation. She suggested as the CAS pointed out, that "the ISU must convince the panel (of arbitrators) to a level very close to ‘beyond reasonable doubt’ that all alternative causes for the increase of %Retics can be excluded, and that additionally, the [a]thlete had an intention to use blood doping." An important consideration here is that the burden of proof should be proportional the severity of the accusation (according to the World Anti-Doping Code), and in legal terms, should fall closer to beyond a reasonable doubt than the ‘comfortable satisfaction’ of the panel. With the information presented, it seems Pechstein's assertion was valid and cast serious doubt on the so-called ‘clear-cut’ positive described by the ISU.

Pechstein denied that she had doped and appealed to the Court of Arbitration for Sport (CAS) in Lausanne, claiming, among other things, that she has an inherited condition explaining the abnormal measurements. The court affirmed the ban in November 2009, finding no evidence for an inherited condition in the expert testimony provided by Pechstein. This was the first case of doping based on circumstantial evidence alone; no forbidden substances were ever found during her repeated tests.

In December 2009, she asked the Federal Supreme Court of Switzerland for an injunction. She was allowed to participate at a single 3000 m race in Salt Lake City so that she could qualify for the 2010 Winter Olympics in Vancouver should her appeal of the ban be successful. She finished 13th in the race on 11 December but would have needed a place among the top 8 to qualify for the Olympics.

In January 2010, the Swiss Federal Supreme Court refused to temporarily suspend Pechstein's ban for the Olympics. On 19 February 2010 the CAS ad hoc panel at the Vancouver Olympics rejected Pechstein's last-minute appeal to be admitted to the ice skating team events.

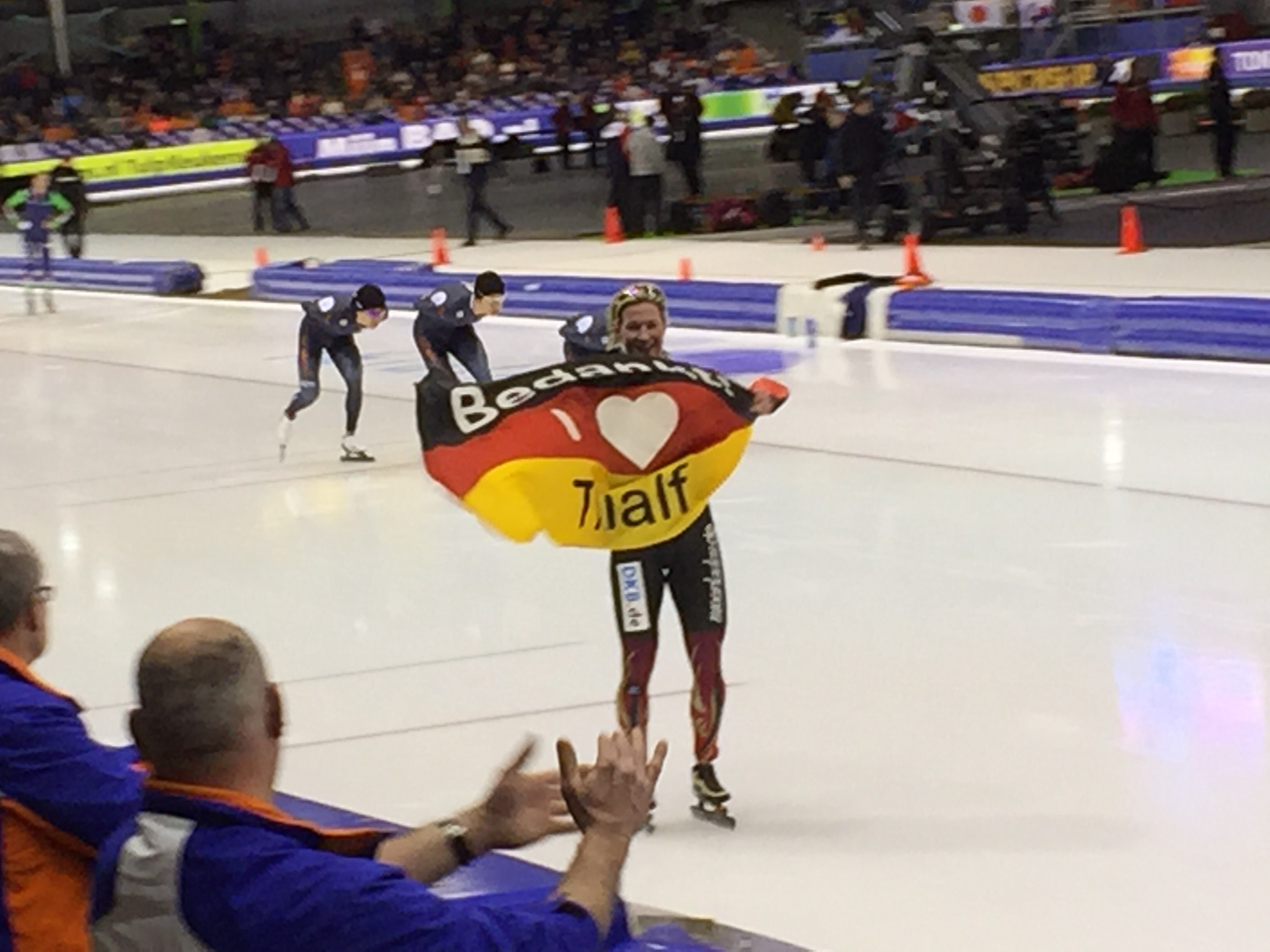
Pechstein in 2015

In February 2010, Pechstein filed a criminal complaint in Switzerland against the International Skating Union, alleging trial fraud.

On 15 March 2010, Gerhard Ehninger, head of the German Society for Hematology and Oncology, said that an evaluation of the case points to a light form of blood anemia called spherocytosis – apparently inherited from her father. Pechstein attempted to use this new evidence in her appeal before the Federal Supreme Court of Switzerland. The International Skating Union issued a press release explaining their opposition to this appeal.

Pechstein stood to lose her position with the German Federal Police should blood doping have been proved "beyond reasonable doubt". Disciplinary proceedings against her were halted in August 2010 because no such proof was available. Pechstein applied for unpaid leave in order to be able to continue her training, which was denied. As a result, she suffered a nervous breakdown in September 2010.

The Swiss Federal Supreme Court issued its final ruling on 28 September 2010, rejecting Pechstein's appeal and confirming the ban. Pechstein returned to competition in February 2011. She next won the bronze medal in the 2011 World Championships in the 5000 m race, finishing behind world champion Martina Sáblíková from the Czech Republic and her teammate Stephanie Beckert.

After this, Pechstein charged the International Skating Union for damages before German courts. While on 7 June 2016, the lower Federal Court of Justice of Germany rejected her initial appeal, on 3 June 2022, the higher Federal Constitutional Court of Germany ruled that Pechstein's fundamental rights had been violated. Based on that decision, the case for damages was sent back to the lower courts for re-trial and is currently still pending.

== Skating records ==
=== Personal records ===
Personal records
Women's speed skating
Event	Result	Date	Location	Notes
500 m	38.99	18 March 2006	Olympic Oval, Calgary	
1000 m	1:16.00	24 February 2007	Olympic Oval, Calgary	
1500 m	1:54.31	17 November 2007	Olympic Oval, Calgary	
3000 m	3:57.35	18 March 2006	Olympic Oval, Calgary	
5000 m	6:46.91	23 February 2002	Utah Olympic Oval, Salt Lake City	World record until beaten by Martina Sáblíková on 11 March 2007. Olympic record until beaten by Irene Schouten on 10 February 2022. Still current German record.

She is currently in 14th position in the adelskalender.

=== World records ===
World records
Women's speed skating
Event	Result	Date	Location	Notes
3000 m	4:07.13	13 December 1997	Vikingskipet, Hamar	World record until beaten by Gunda Niemann-Stirnemann on 14 March 1998.
5000 m	6:59.61	20 February 1998	M-Wave, Nagano	World record until beaten by Gunda Niemann-Stirnemann on 28 March 1998.
3000 m	3:59.26	2 March 2001	Olympic Oval, Calgary	World record until beaten by herself on 10 February 2002.
3000 m	3:57.70	10 February 2002	Utah Olympic Oval, Salt Lake City	World record until beaten by Cindy Klassen on 12 November 2005. Olympic record until beaten by Irene Schouten on 5 February 2022.
5000 m	6:46.91	23 February 2002	Utah Olympic Oval, Salt Lake City	World record until beaten by Martina Sáblíková on 11 March 2007. Olympic record until beaten by Irene Schouten on 10 February 2022. Still current German record.
Team pursuit	2:56.04	12 November 2005	Olympic Oval, Calgary	World record (with Daniela Anschütz and Anni Friesinger) until beaten by Kristina Groves, Christine Nesbitt and Brittany Schussler on 6 December 2009.

=== Olympic records ===
Olympic records
Women's speed skating
Event	Result	Date	Location	Notes
3000 m	3:57.70	10 February 2002	Utah Olympic Oval, Salt Lake City	Olympic record until beaten by Irene Schouten on 5 February 2022.
5000 m	6:46.91	23 February 2002	Utah Olympic Oval, Salt Lake City	Olympic record until beaten by Irene Schouten on 10 February 2022. Still current German record.

== Results ==
Season	German Championships Single Distances	German Championships Allround	European Championships Allround	European Championships Single Distances	World Championships Allround	World Championships Single Distances	Olympic Games	World Cup GWC	World Championships Junior Allround
1987–88	18th 500m 8th 1000m 15th 1500m								SEOUL (bronze) 500m (bronze) 1500m 5th 1000m 5th 3000m (silver) overall
1988–89									KYIV (bronze) 500m (silver) 1500m 10th 1000m (silver) 3000m 4th overall
1989–90	17th 500m 6th 5000m								OBIHIRO 7th 500m 9th 1500m 7th 1000m (silver) 3000m 4th overall
1990–91	11th 500m (silver) 3000m (silver) 5000m								
1991–92	14th 500m 9th 1500m 4th 3000m (silver) 5000m		HEERENVEEN 16th 500m 20th 3000m 7th 1500m 16th 5000m 14th overall		HEERENVEEN 21st 500m 6th 3000m 11th 1500m 6th 5000m 6th overall		ALBERTVILLE (bronze) 5000m	21st 1500m 8th 3000/5000m	
1992–93		5th 500m (silver) 3000m (bronze) 1500m (bronze) 5000m (silver) overall	HEERENVEEN 12th 500m 16th 3000m 12th 1500m DNS 5000m NC19 overall		BERLIN 19th 500m 8th 3000m 17th 1500m 8th 5000m 9th overall			10th 1500m 7th 3000/5000m	
1993–94							HAMAR (bronze) 5000m (gold) 5000m	17th 3000/5000m	
1994–95	(bronze) 1500m	6th 500m (silver) 3000m (silver) 1500m (bronze) 5000m (silver) overall	HEERENVEEN 9th 500m 6th 3000m 6th 1500m 4th 5000m 4th overall		SAVALEN 14th 500m 9th 3000m 9th 1500m 7th 5000m 7th overall			8th 1500m 11th 3000/5000m	
1995–96	NC2 500m (silver) 1500m (silver) 3000m	(gold) 500m (gold) 3000m (gold) 1500m (gold) 5000m (gold) overall	HEERENVEEN 4th 500m 4th 3000m (silver) 1500m (silver) 5000m (bronze) overall		INZELL 8th 500m 7th 3000m (silver) 1500m (gold) 5000m (silver) overall	HAMAR (silver) 1500m (silver) 3000m (gold) 5000m		4th 1500m (silver) 3000/5000m	

World Cup overall
- 1500 meters
  - 2003: 2nd
  - 2002: 2nd
  - 2001: 3rd
  - 2000: 2nd
  - 1999: 2nd
  - 1998: 2nd
- 3000/5000 meters
  - 2012: 3rd
  - 2008: 2nd
  - 2007: 3rd
  - 2006: 2nd
  - 2005: 1st
  - 2004: 1st
  - 2003: 1st
  - 2002: 2nd
  - 2001: 2nd
  - 2000: 2nd
  - 1999: 2nd
  - 1998: 2nd
  - 1996: 2nd
- Mass start
  - 2012: 2nd
World Cup medals
- 1500 meters
  - 1st: -->6
  - 2nd: ->13
  - 3rd: -->9
- 3000 meters
  - 1st: ->14
  - 2nd: ->25
  - 3rd: -->7
- 5000 meters
  - 1st: -->6
  - 2nd: -->10
  - 3rd: -->4
- Mass start
  - 1st: -->2
  - 2nd: -->2
  - 3rd: -->1
- Combination
  - 1st: -->0
  - 2nd: -->1
  - 3rd: -->0
- Team pursuit
  - 1st: -->4
  - 2nd: -->2
  - 3rd: -->3
- Total medals
  - 1st: ->32
  - 2nd: ->53
  - 3rd: ->24

All: ->109

Overall medals
- Olympics
  - 1st: -->5
  - 2nd: -->2
  - 3rd: -->2
- World Champion Single
  - 1st: -->5
  - 2nd: ->12
  - 3rd: -->12
- World Champion Overall
  - 1st: -->1
  - 2nd: -->8
  - 3rd: -->2
- World Cup
  - 1st: ->32
  - 2nd: ->53
  - 3rd: ->24

All: ->158

- updated 15 Feb 2015

Source: SpeedSkatingStats.com

== See also ==
- List of multiple Olympic gold medalists
- List of multiple Winter Olympic medalists
- List of multiple Olympic medalists in one event
- List of people from Berlin

Records
Preceded by (Germany) Gunda Niemann-Stirnemann (Germany) Gunda Niemann-Stirnemann	Women's 3000 m speed skating world record 13 December 1997 – 14 March 1998; 2 March 2001 – 12 November 2005	Succeeded by (Germany) Gunda Niemann-Stirnemann (Canada) Cindy Klassen
Preceded by (Germany) Gunda Niemann-Stirnemann (Germany) Gunda Niemann-Stirnemann	Women's 5000 m speed skating world record 20 February 1998 – 28 March 1998; 23 February 2002 – 11 March 2007	Succeeded by (Germany) Gunda Niemann-Stirnemann (Czech Republic) Martina Sáblíková
Preceded by (Canada) Kristina Groves, Clara Hughes, Cindy Klassen	Women's team pursuit speed skating world record 12 November 2005 – 6 December 2009 with Daniela Anschütz and Anni Friesinger	Succeeded by (Canada) Kristina Groves, Christine Nesbitt, Brittany Schussler
