= Taereung International Skating Rink =

Speed skating rink in South Korea

Coordinates: 37°38′18″N 127°06′11″E

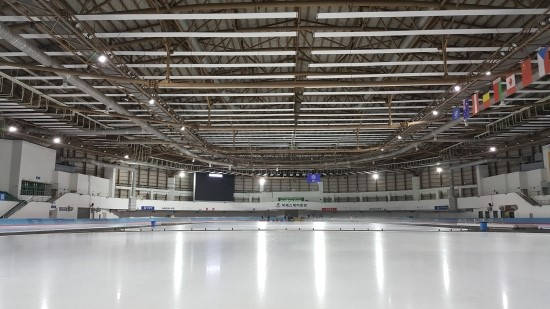
Taereung International Skating Rink

Taereung International Skating Rink is a speed skating oval in South Korea, used for training and competitions, operated by the Korean Olympic Committee. It is one of only two indoor long-track (400m) skating facilities in the country, and the most actively used, with Gangneung Oval completed in 2017 for the 2018 Winter Olympics but planned for conversion to a multi-sports and convention center. It is also one of the remaining active training grounds of the Korea National Training Center in Gongneung-dong, Nowon-gu in northeast Seoul; most other teams, including the short track and ice hockey teams, have moved to Jincheon National Training Center.

The facility offers instructional courses in speed skating and figure skating, along with open skate hours for the general public

== International events hosted ==
- 1989-90 ISU Speed Skating World Cup - weekend 4
- 1992-93 ISU Speed Skating World Cup - weekend 3
- 2000-01 ISU Speed Skating World Cup - weekend 3
- 2000 World Sprint Speed Skating Championships
- 2004 World Single Distance Speed Skating Championships
- 2014–15 ISU Speed Skating World Cup - weekend 2
- 2016 World Sprint Speed Skating Championships
