= Single parents in South Korea =

Demographic category

In 2022 there were approximately 1.49 million households in South Korea which were headed by a single parent (that is, approximately 6.5% of populations in the country).

These parents face a number of challenges, primarily economic, but also social. There is some government support for them, although a significant number of parents may not receive these benefits. Laws have been passed over time to provide further support for them.

== Statistics ==
The number and proportion of single-parent households increased after 2005 for several years, then declined. There were 1.37 million in 2005 (8.6%), 1.594 million in 2010 (9.2%), and 1.639 million in 2011 (9.3%). The proportion then declined to 6.5% in 2022.

== Challenges ==
Single-parent families cite economic problems as their greatest challenge.

Other challenges include family issues, interpersonal problems, managing child rearing, isolation due to a diminished social life, and dealing with grief if their partner had died. In particular, female single-parent families were found to be particularly stressed by these issues. These issues lead to health impacts. There is a high occurrence of depression and low self-esteem, caused in part by social stigmas around single parents. In particular, it has been noted that single mothers will experience more stigma and difficulties than single fathers. In 2009, several unwed mothers came today and established the Korean Unwed Mothers’ Families Association KUMFA. KUMFA offers practical and community support to unwed mothers.

The social networks are important for dealing with these issues. However, divorced couples may experience greater difficulty in this area as they lose social connections that were through their spouse.

== Government support ==
Around 87 percent of single-parent families do not receive any government support. In 2020, the country had the highest poverty rate among single-parents in OECD countries. South Korea's single-parent family support policy is based on the Single-Parent Family Support Act. The Single-Parent Family Support Act was enacted in 1989.

Laws passed in 2011 and 2013 have provided a legal framework for combatting social prejudice and discrimination against single parents. In 2011, a law was passed that allowed the continuance of government support even if their children were aged 18 or older.

== See also ==
Choi Hyung-sook
