= Title of honor =

Title recognizing merit and not authority

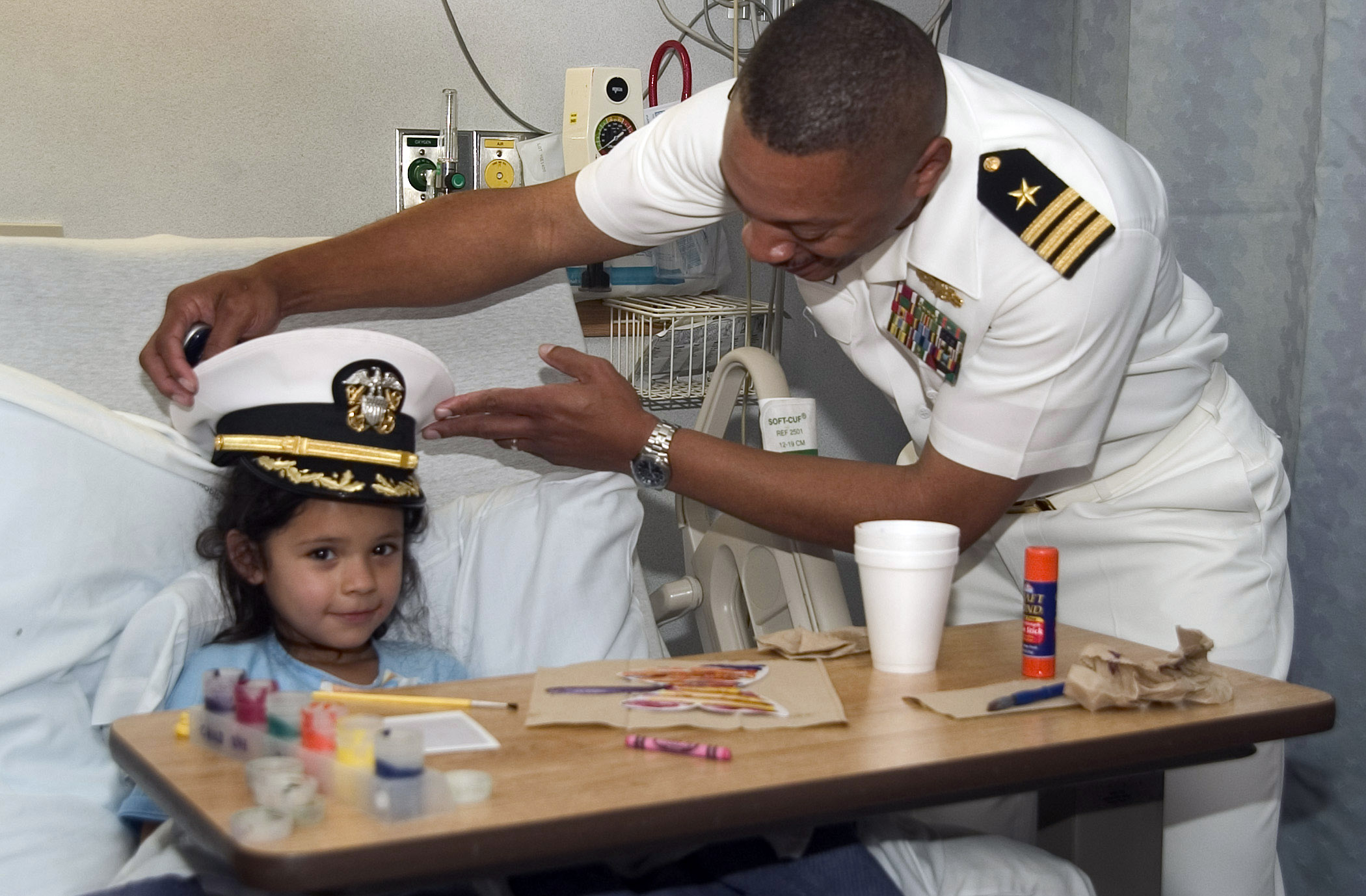
A U.S. Navy commander giving a hospitalized child his cap, bestowing her the title of "honorary ship's commander for a day"

A title of honor or honorary title is a title bestowed upon individuals or organizations as an award in recognition of their merits.

Sometimes the title bears the same or nearly the same name as a title of authority, but the person bestowed does not have to carry out any duties, except for ceremonial ones. The title may sometimes be temporary, only valid for the individual's visit or for a single day, though they can also be permanent titles. In some cases, these titles are bestowed posthumously.

Some historical honorary titles may be bought, like certain titles of nobility. This has long been a matter of fraud, both outright and indirect. Honorary titles also serve as positions of sinecure and honorary retirement.

== Examples ==
Some examples of honorary titles from various areas include:

- Academician
- Fellow of an academic, artistic, or professional society
- Fire chief
- Freeman of the City of London
- Hero of the Russian Federation
- Honorary Colonel
- Honorary degree or position, such as honorary Professor
- Knight, Dame, or Companion of an honorific order
- Military positions (e.g. officer) and ranks (e.g. admiral), for people who are not part of the military
- New Knowledge Worker of Korea
- People's Artist
- Honorary counselors (neuvos) in Finland, such as valtioneuvos (Counselor of State) and vuorineuvos (Counselor of Mining)

== See also ==
- Honorary citizenship
- Agnomen, part of the Roman naming convention
- Courtesy title, a form of address in systems of nobility used by children, former wives and other close relatives of a peer
- False titles of nobility
- Hereditary titles
- Honorary title (academic)
- Honorary titles in Russia
- Honorific
- Laqab, part of a traditional Arabic name
- List of titles
- Royal and noble styles
- Style (manner of address)
- Victory title, honorific title adopted by a successful military commander to commemorate a victory
