= Korea National Training Center =

Athletic training center in South Korea

Coordinates: 37.635250°N 127.104565°E

- Hangul: 태릉선수촌
- Hanja: 泰陵選手村
- RR: Taereung seonsuchon
- MR: T'aerŭng sŏnsuch'on

Korea National Training Center, also known as the Taereung Training Center, located in Gongneung-dong, Nowon District, in the northeast part of Seoul, is the first national athletic training center established in South Korea.

Since its establishment on 30 June 1966 by the Korea Sports Council (대한체육회 大韓體育會), Taereung Training Center has been the home of elite Korean sports activities. It consists of 24 buildings, including training facilities, gymnasiums and dormitories in an area of 100,000 square metres (25 acres). The training facilities have accommodated 20 different sport events such as athletics, gymnastics, archery, taekwondo, wrestling, swimming, and others.

In 2011, a newer facility, Jincheon National Training Center, was built to replace the crowded Taereung Training Center.

== See also ==
- Sports in South Korea
- Korea National Sport University
