= Jincheon County =

Coordinates: 36°51′24″N 127°26′36″E

Jincheon
- County
- Panoramic view of Jincheon-eup

- Flag Emblem of Jincheon

- Location in South Korea
- Country: South Korea
- Region: Hoseo
- Administrative divisions: 2 eup, 5 myeon

Government
  - Mayor: Song Ki-sub (송기영)

Area
  - Total: 407.38 km^{2} (157.29 sq mi)

Population
  - Total: 86,742
  - Density: 150.1/km^{2} (389/sq mi)
  - Dialect: Chungcheong

Korean name
- Hangul: 진천군
- Hanja: 鎭川郡
- RR: Jincheon-gun
- MR: Chinch'ŏn-gun

Jincheon County (Korean: 진천군) is a county in North Chungcheong Province (North Chungcheong) Province, South Korea.

== Location ==
Jincheon belongs to the middle of North Chungcheong Province. It borders several cities of its province but also meets Gyeonggi Province. The southwestern part of this area is mountainous.

== Industry ==
Farming has moved in this country from the second most successful industry to the major contribution of this region. Hyundai Autonet moved its former factories into Jincheon and got to operate from February 2008.

CJ also revealed its plan to construct a processing complex.

In a Korean village, a Squid Game doll also had been spotted.

== Festival ==
Jincheon holds a World Taekwondo Hwarang festival every year. The festival is an opportunity for all enthusiasts of Taekwondo to come together.

The festival has more meaning as experience, since it not only provides a vast tour opportunity in Korea, but participants also experience the spirit of Korean martial arts.

== Tourist attractions ==
Jincheon Bell Museum

The Jincheon Bell Museum was opened in September 2005 to inform people of the Korean bells and their artistic value that received recognition from the world through various activities including planning exhibitions and education as well as studying, collecting, exhibiting, and preserving them.

Nonggyo Bridge in Jincheon

This stone bridge (石橋) called 'Nonggyo Bridge' as the bridge on Saegeumcheon in front of Gulti Village, Gugok-ri, Munbaek-myeon. According to the record of 『Sangsanji(常山誌)』(1932), General Lim built it in the early Goryeo Dynasty.

== Twin towns – sister cities ==
Jincheon is twinned with:

- Seongdong-gu, Seoul
- Gangdong-gu, Seoul
- Vallejo, California, United States

== See also ==
- Jincheon National Training Center
