= Talent Award of Korea =

Civil award of South Korea

Awarded by the Deputy Prime Minister and Minister of Education of the Republic of Korea
- Type: Single-grade
- Established: 2014
- Eligibility: Talented Korean Citizens with quota of 100 per annum
- Awarded for: individuals who performed exemplary talents or outstanding meritorious service
- Status: Now awarded
- Grades: Talent Award of Korea (KTA)

Precedence
- Related: Award for Outstanding Talent who will lead 21st Century (before 2008); Talent Medal of Korea (before 2014)

The Talent Award of Korea (Korean: 대한민국인재상) is an award bestowed by the Deputy Prime Minister and Minister of Education of Korea from 2014.

Between 2008 and 2013, this award was the Talent Medal of Korea bestowed by the President of the Republic of Korea with a post-nominal (KTM) and Presidential Medal.

This award recognizes those individuals who are likely to become Korea's future leaders and have performed exemplary talents or outstanding meritorious service. Fifty high school students, fifty adults including college students are selected based on their intelligence, passion, creativity, and community spirit.

== History of the award ==
The Government of Korea has given awards for exceptional talent since 2001. The name of the so-called Talent Award has varied during this time. Beginning in 2001, the Government of Korea entitled the Award for Outstanding Talent who will lead 21st Century.

In 2008, the President of Korea Lee Myung-bak established the Talent Medal of Korea, with a quota of 100 awards per year, replaced the former Award for Outstanding Talent who will lead 21st Century. From 2008 to 2013, it was bestowed upon a total of 610 people. Notable recipients included Son Yeon Jae and Yuna Kim.

Following severe critiques from non-scientists and politicians, criticized this award is mostly bestowed to scientists and inventors, the Talent Medal of Korea was replaced by the Talent Award of Korea with the same quota, beginning in 2014.

== See also ==
- New Knowledge Worker of Korea
