= Jincheon National Training Center =

Athletic training center in South Korea

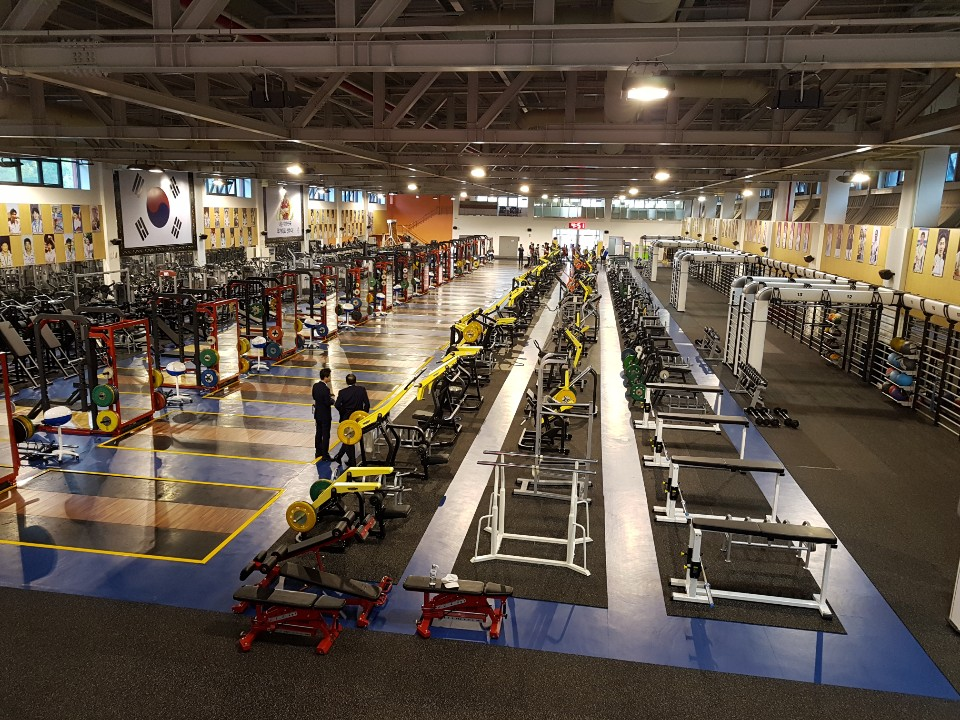
- Interactive map of Jincheon National Training Center
- Location: Jincheon, South Korea
- Capacity: 1,150
- Field size: 856,253 m^{2}

Construction
- Groundbreaking: 2009.02
- Built: 2009-2017
- Opened: 27 Sep 2017
- Cost: 184 billion

Jincheon National Training Center is South Korea's main national athletic training village, managed by the Korean Sport & Olympic Committee. It was built due to the lack of space at the Korea National Training Center. After completing the first phase of the project on October 27, 2011, the completion ceremony was held on September 27, 2017, and it is located at 105 (Hoejuk-ri 374-1) of the athletes' village in Gwanghyewon-myeon, Jincheon-gun, Chungcheongbuk-do.

The total area is 856,253 square meters, and 350 athletes in 12 sports, including track and field, shooting and swimming, will be able to train at the latest facilities.

== Facilities ==
Jincheon National Training Centre boasts 21 indoor and outdoor training facilities.

Indoor training facilities include the multi-sports gym, the swimming center (including a diving pool and a pool for water polo and synchronised swimming), the velodrome indoor tennis courts, the rowing and canoeing training center, the indoor shooting range and the martial arts centre.

Outdoor training facilities include the track and field center, baseball and softball diamonds, the javelin and discus field, a cross-country course, outdoors tennis courts, archery range and a clay shooting range.

Accommodation facilities within the village are able to accommodate up to 1,150 athletes in 35 sports across 358 rooms in eight accommodation buildings. This has tripled approximately tripled the capacity of on-site accommodation compared to 450 athletes in 12 sports in the former National Training Centre in Taereung.

The training village also boasts an athlete's centre, an on-site medical center, and a high-tech sports science centre.

== See also ==
- Korea National Training Center
