= New Knowledge Worker of Korea =

South Korean distinction and honorary title

The New Knowledge Worker of Korea or New Knowledge Person (abbreviated to NKWK as the post-nominal) (Korean: 대한민국 신지식인) is a distinction and honorary title in the Republic of Korea awarded personally for exceptional achievements with new knowledge including new skills and ideas in national economy, culture and arts. This honour bestowed by National Commission for Rebuilding Korea (before 2003), Ministry of Government Administration and Home Affairs (after 2003) of the Republic of Korea. The Ministry for Food, Agriculture, Forestry and Fisheries of Korea separately confers the New Knowledge Farmer after 1999.

The Government of Korea has recognised 3,227 people as New Knowledge Workers.

Large number of New Knowledge Worker recognitions had been awarded by National Commission for Rebuilding Korea before 2003, but just 274 New Knowledge Workers are awarded the titles after 2003.

== See also ==
- New Knowledge Farmer of Korea
- Hero of Socialist Labour (USSR)
