= Stephanie Beckert =

German speed skater (born 1988)

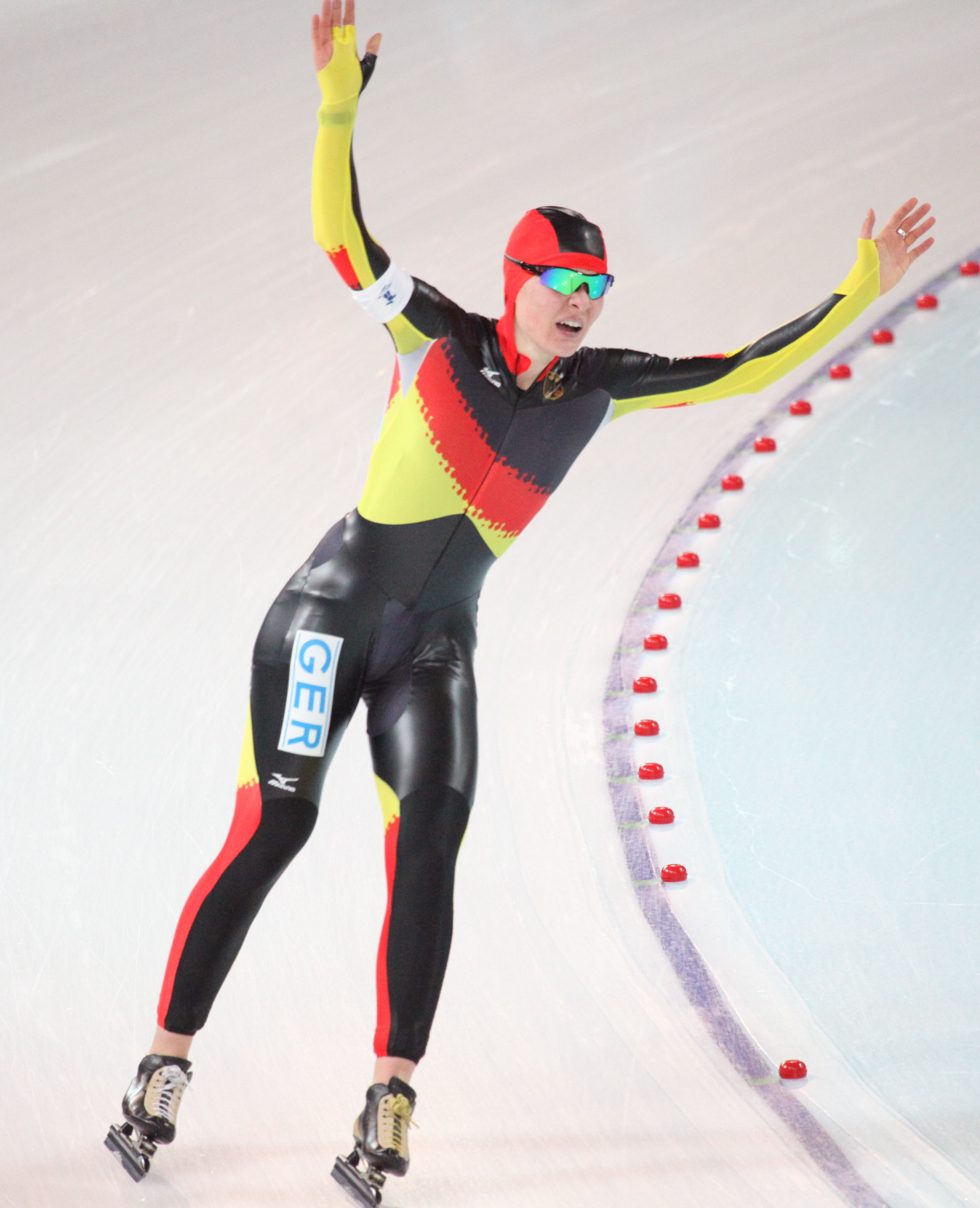
- Beckert in 2010

Personal information
- Born: 30 May 1988 (age 38) Erfurt, East Germany
- Height: 1.72 m (5 ft 8 in)
- Weight: 69 kg (152 lb)

Sport
- Sport: Speed skating
- Club: ESC Erfurt, Erfurt
Medal record
Women's speed skating
Representing Germany
Olympic Games
Gold medal – first place	2010 Vancouver	Team pursuit
Silver medal – second place	2010 Vancouver	3000 m
Silver medal – second place	2010 Vancouver	5000 m
World Championships
Silver medal – second place	2011 Inzell	5000 m
Silver medal – second place	2012 Heerenveen	3000 m
Silver medal – second place	2012 Heerenveen	5000 m
Bronze medal – third place	2011 Inzell	3000 m
Bronze medal – third place	2011 Inzell	Team pursuit

Stephanie Beckert (born 30 May 1988) is a long-distance speed skater from Germany. She had a fourth place standing at the 2008–09 women's 3000/5000 m World Cup. At the 2010 Winter Olympics she won one gold and two silver medals.

Her mother Angela and five younger brothers and sisters all did speed skating, and one of the brothers, Patrick, competed at the 2010 Olympics. Her father Detlef is a retired handball player. Stephanie first trained in figure skating, but at the age of 10 switched to speed skating. Since October 2006 Beckert is serving in the German Army and has a rank of sergeant.
