= 2011 World Single Distance Speed Skating Championships =

World Single Distance Speed Skating Championships
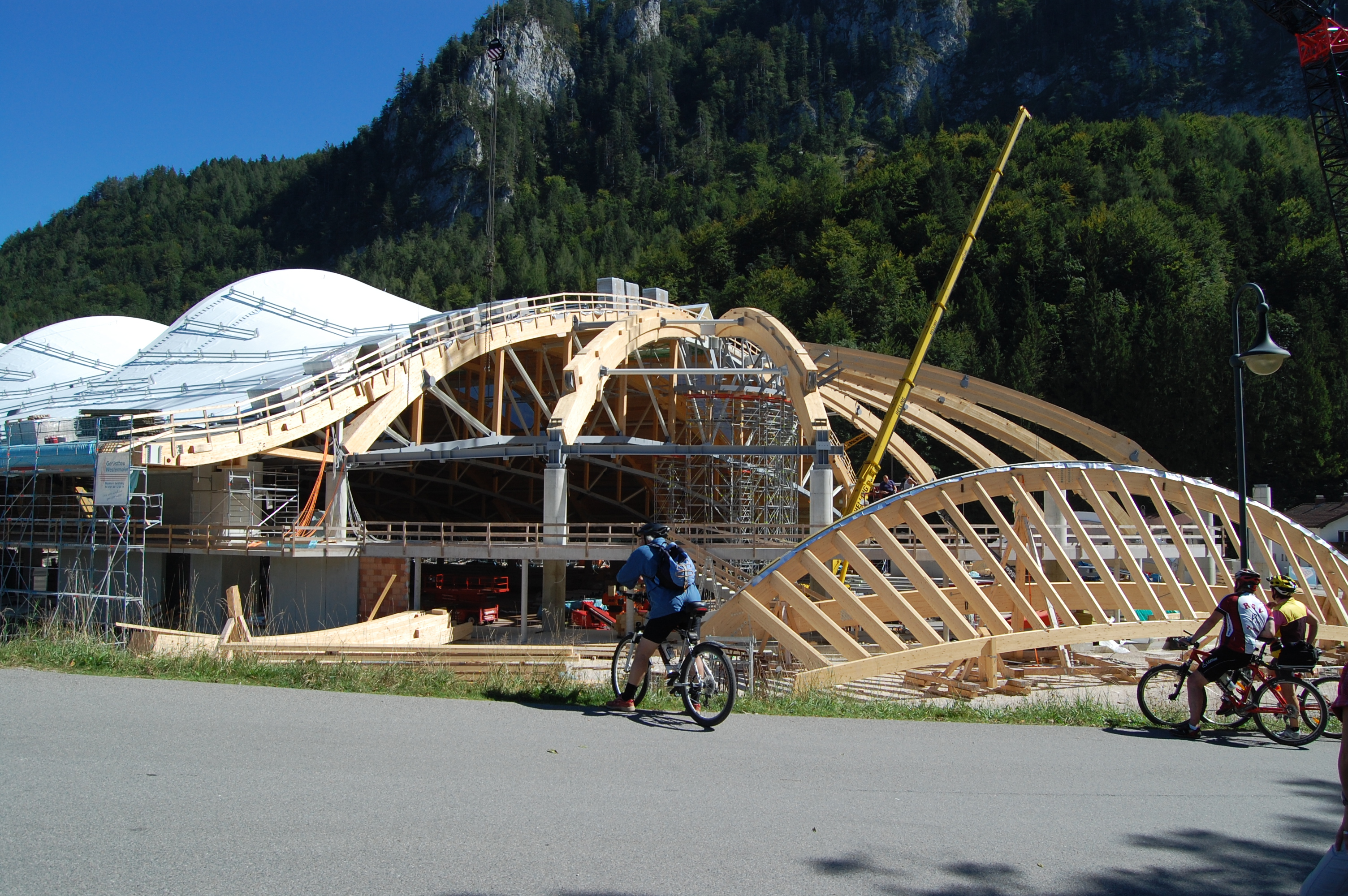
- Max Aicher Arena (Inzell)
- Venue: Max Aicher Arena (Inzell)
- Dates: 10–13 March 2011

The 2011 World Single Distance Speed Skating Championships were held between 10 and 13 March 2011 in the Max Aicher Arena, Inzell, Germany.

The outdoor ice rink was renovated in 2010 and opened an indoor ice rink in 2011.

== Schedule ==
Date	Time	Events
March 10	15:30	1500 m men
March 10	16:30	3000 m women
March 11	14:00	1000 m men
March 11	14:55	1500 m women
March 11	15:50	5000 m men
March 12	12:00	1000 m women
March 12	12:55	10000 m men
March 12	15:25	5000 m women
March 13	12:00/13:30	500 m women
March 13	12:45/14:15	500 m men
March 13	15:30	Team pursuit women
March 13	16:15	Team pursuit men

== Medal summary ==
=== Men's events ===
Event	Gold		Silver		Bronze	
500 m	Lee Kyou-hyuk; South Korea	69.10	Joji Kato; Japan	+0.32	Jan Smeekens; Netherlands	+0.33
1000 m	Shani Davis; United States	1.08.45	Kjeld Nuis; Netherlands	+ 0.22	Stefan Groothuis; Netherlands	+ 0.28
1500 m	Håvard Bøkko; Norway	1.45.04	Shani Davis; United States	+ 0.05	Lucas Makowsky; Canada	+ 0.18
5000 m	Bob de Jong; Netherlands	6.15.41	Lee Seung-hoon; South Korea	+ 2.04	Ivan Skobrev; Russia	+ 2.06
10000 m	Bob de Jong; Netherlands	12.48.20	Bob de Vries; Netherlands	+ 16.42	Ivan Skobrev; Russia	+ 19.97
Team pursuit	United States; Shani Davis; Trevor Marsicano; Jonathan Kuck	3:41.72	Canada; Mathieu Giroux; Lucas Makowsky; Denny Morrison	+0.13	Netherlands; Bob de Vries; Jan Blokhuijsen; Koen Verweij	+1.72

=== Women's events ===
Event	Gold		Silver		Bronze	
500 m	Jenny Wolf; Germany	75.93	Lee Sang-hwa; South Korea	+0.24	Wang Beixing; China	+0.46
1000 m	Christine Nesbitt; Canada	1.14.84	Ireen Wüst; Netherlands	+ 0.58	Heather Richardson; United States	+ 0.61
1500 m	Ireen Wüst; Netherlands	1.54.80	Diane Valkenburg; Netherlands	+ 1.47	Jorien Voorhuis; Netherlands	+ 2.50
3000 m	Ireen Wüst; Netherlands	4.01.56	Martina Sáblíková; Czech Republic	+ 0.51	Stephanie Beckert; Germany	+ 2.72
5000 m	Martina Sáblíková; Czech Republic	6.50.83	Stephanie Beckert; Germany	+ 4.16	Claudia Pechstein; Germany	+ 10.07
Team pursuit	Canada; Christine Nesbitt; Brittany Schussler; Cindy Klassen	2:59.74	Netherlands; Ireen Wüst; Diane Valkenburg; Marrit Leenstra	+0.69	Germany; Stephanie Beckert; Isabell Ost; Claudia Pechstein	+2.08

== Medal table ==
Rank	Nation	Gold	Silver	Bronze	Total
1	Netherlands (NED)	4	5	4	13
2	Canada (CAN)	2	1	1	4
2	United States (USA)	2	1	1	4
4	South Korea (KOR)	1	2	0	3
5	Germany (GER)	1	1	3	5
6	Czech Republic (CZE)	1	1	0	2
7	Norway (NOR)	1	0	0	1
8	Japan (JPN)	0	1	0	1
9	Russia (RUS)	0	0	2	2
10	China (CHN)	0	0	1	1
Totals (10 entries)		12	12	12	36
