= 2006–07 ISU Speed Skating World Cup =

International speed skating competition

ISU Speed Skating World Cup
- Dates: 2006–2007

The 2006–07 ISU Speed Skating World Cup was a multi-race tournament over a season of speed skating. The season began on 10 November 2006 and lasted until 4 March 2007. The World Cup was organised by the ISU, who also run world cups and championships in short track speed skating and figure skating.

== Races ==
=== Men ===
Date	Place	Dist.	Winner	Time	Second	Time	Third	Time
November 10, 2006	Heerenveen, Netherlands	500 m	(Japan) Keiichiro Nagashima	35.10	(South Korea) Lee Kang-seok	35.25	(South Korea) Lee Kyou-hyuk	35.31
Nagashima, 14th overall in the 2006 World Cup and 13th at the 2006 Olympics, won his first World Cup race after setting the winning time in the eighth of the 15 pairs. Two Koreans, with the defending World Cup champion Lee Kang-seok, followed.
November 10, 2006	Heerenveen, Netherlands	1500 m	(Netherlands) Erben Wennemars	1:45.96	(United States) Shani Davis	1:46.45	(Netherlands) Jan Bos	1:46.76
Wennemars, who had been disqualified from the 500 m, took the first win for the hosts. In the last pair, Shani Davis met Olympic champion Italian Enrico Fabris, and the two prevented the Dutch from finishing with the top four spots.
November 11, 2006	Heerenveen, Netherlands	1000 m	(South Korea) Lee Kyou-hyuk	1:09.01	(Netherlands) Beorn Nijenhuis	1:09.21	(Netherlands) Erben Wennemars	1:09.37
Lee, 17th in the 2006 World Cup, won Korea's second victory in this Heerenveen weekend. After Lee had finished, five Dutchmen attacked his time, but failed to beat the Korean, though all finished in the top 13. Olympic champion Davis finished out of the podium, 0.01 of a second behind Wennemars.
November 11, 2006	Heerenveen, Netherlands	5000 m	(Netherlands) Sven Kramer	6:16.64	(Netherlands) Carl Verheijen	6:18.81	(Norway) Eskil Ervik	6:20.46
Kramer and Ervik in the 13th of the 15 pairs set the pace, taking first and second position in the race. Verheijen then skated alone in the 14th pair, as Olympic champion and defending long distance World Cup holder Chad Hedrick withdrew, and though he was never ahead of Kramer he passed Ervik's lap times on the penultimate lap and eventually finished second. In the last pair, neither Enrico Fabris nor Arne Dankers were ever ahead of third-place finisher Ervik.
November 12, 2006	Heerenveen, Netherlands	500 m	(Japan) Keiichiro Nagashima	35.24	(South Korea) Lee Kyou-hyuk	35.31	(Finland) Pekka Koskela	35.40
American Tucker Fredricks set the pace in the 12th of 16 pairs, skating in 35.47 and taking a lead of 0.33 seconds. Three pairs later, Koskela bettered that time, beating Lee Kang-seok of Korea on the final stretch to finish 0.05 seconds ahead of his pairmate and 0.07 seconds ahead of Fredricks. However, Nagashima took his second World Cup win in three days, despite skating 0.14 seconds slower than in Friday's race, and pairmate Lee Kyou-hyuk couldn't quite catch up with the deficit he gave away in the opening 100 metres.
November 12, 2006	Heerenveen, Netherlands	1000 m	(United States) Shani Davis	1:09.17	(South Korea) Lee Kyou-hyuk	1:09.26	(Canada) Denny Morrison	1:09.35
Morrison, who placed 11th in the first race, took the lead after pipping Yevgeniy Lalenkov by around a quarter of a second on the final lap. His time then stood until the second last pair, where Olympic champion Shani Davis came up with an even better finishing lap after having skated the first 600 metres at an identical pace. Davis' pairmate Nijenhuis, third in the first race, was ahead with a lap to go but finished 14th after a last lap almost two seconds worse than Davis due to an instability in one of the corners. In the final pair, Lee had eight tenths of a second on Davis before the final lap, but lost by 0.09 in goal.
November 17, 2006	Berlin, Germany	500 m	(South Korea) Lee Kyou-hyuk	35.08	(South Korea) Lee Kang-seok	35.21	(United States) Tucker Fredricks	35.27
In the eighth pair, Lee Kyou-hyuk came up with the fastest time on the World Cup circuit this season, enough to secure his fifth career World Cup race win. Though he started slowly, a tenth behind pairmate Yu Fengtong, his last lap was ahead of any others, and no one else could hold on to their advantage. Fredricks placed on the podium for the first time in two seasons, but Keiichiro Nagashima of Japan held on to his overall World Cup lead after finishing fourth.
November 17, 2006	Berlin, Germany	5000 m	(Netherlands) Sven Kramer	6:09.76	(Netherlands) Carl Verheijen	6:16.49	(Norway) Eskil Ervik	6:17.32
Kramer's time was at the time the fourth fastest ever recorded on the distance, just under a second slower than his own world record from Utah Olympic Oval. All laps were completed below 30 seconds, and his victory was by far the largest in terms of samalog points thus far in the season. Like in Heerenveen, Verheijen sneaked past Ervik's times on the final lap, after being 0.27 seconds down after 4600 metres.
November 18, 2006	Berlin, Germany	500 m	(Finland) Pekka Koskela	35.02	(South Korea) Lee Kang-seok	35.05	(South Korea) Lee Kyou-hyuk	35.07
Koskela's second World Cup victory, and his time was the fastest in the World Cup this season. The two Koreans faced each other in the last pair, but finished just behind Koskela's time. Lee Kyou-hyuk took over from Nagashima as leader of the overall standings on the 500 metres.
November 18, 2006	Berlin, Germany	1500 m	(Italy) Enrico Fabris	1:45.54	(Netherlands) Erben Wennemars	1:45.64	(United States) Shani Davis	1:45.98
Fabris and Wennemars faced off in the eighth pair, and Wennemars earned a lead of 1.43 seconds after 700 metres. However, Fabris cut the lead slightly on the third lap, before finishing with a final lap of 27.48 seconds to cross the line a tenth of a second before pairmate Wennemars. In the next two pairs, only Davis was within a second of Fabris and Wennemars, as he skated faster than Wennemars on the final lap, but couldn't quite catch up.
November 19, 2006	Berlin, Germany	1000 m	(Netherlands) Erben Wennemars	1:08.88	(South Korea) Mun Jun	1:09.33	(South Korea) Lee Kyou-hyuk	1:09.40
Wennemars became the third winner on the 1000 metres thus far in the season, and by the largest margin. Mun Jun set a good time in the seventh of the ten pairs, while the winner of the second race in Heerenveen, Shani Davis, missed the podium by a hundredth of a second in the final pair.
November 19, 2006	Berlin, Germany	Team pursuit	(Netherlands) Netherlands; Sven Kramer; Carl Verheijen; Erben Wennemars	3:40.79	(Norway) Norway; Håvard Bøkko; Henrik Christiansen; Eskil Ervik	3:45.97	(Canada) Canada; Arne Dankers; Steven Elm; Denny Morrison	3:46.31
The Dutch were just a second behind the world record, and had little competition; pairmates Norway were within a second after half the race, but eventually finished five seconds down. In the final pair, neither Canada nor Olympic champions Italy managed to beat the Norwegians' time.
November 25, 2006	Moscow, Russia	1500 m	(Netherlands) Erben Wennemars	1:46.85	(Italy) Enrico Fabris	1:47.30	(Russia) Ivan Skobrev	1:47.69
Six of the top ten skaters in the World Cup rankings did not take part in this race, but leaders Wennemars and Fabris placed themselves in the top two. Skobrev got his first World Cup podium place, and advanced to fifth in the overall standings, while Beorn Nijenhuis, who skated his first World Cup 1500 this season, finished fourth.
November 26, 2006	Moscow, Russia	10,000 m	(Italy) Enrico Fabris	13:14.94	(Germany) Tobias Schneider	13:16.36	(Norway) Øystein Grødum	13:17.88
In the absence of Kramer and Verheijen, the top two in the long distance World Cup rankings, Fabris won his first World Cup race on an event different from the 1500 metres. Third-ranked Eskil Ervik complained of back pains and finished 11th out of 12 skaters in the A group, while in the B group 34-year-old marathon skater Kurt Wubben made his World Cup debut by skating faster than anyone in the A group.
December 2, 2006	Harbin, PR China	500 m	(Finland) Pekka Koskela	34.98	(South Korea) Lee Kang-seok	35.09	(South Korea) Lee Kyou-hyuk	35.13
Koskela won his second 500 metres race of the season, the only skater to be able to finish under 35 seconds in a new track record. Lee Kyou-hyuk and Lee Kang-seok also finish on the podium, with Kyu-Hyuk holding the overall lead ten points ahead of Kang-Seok.
December 2, 2006	Harbin, PR China	1000 m	(South Korea) Lee Kyou-hyuk	1:09.39	(Netherlands) Erben Wennemars	1:09.66	(Netherlands) Beorn Nijenhuis	1:09.98
Lee Kyou-hyuk took his ninth successive podium place on the 500 and 1000 metres of the season, and his second 1000 metres win of the season, though the winning time was the slowest of all races so far this year. With two top-six skaters missing in Davis and Morrison, Wennemars and Nijenhuis also finished underneath 1:10.00 in second and third position.
December 3, 2006	Harbin, PR China	100 m	(Japan) Yūya Oikawa	9.58	(South Korea) Lee Kang-seok	9.63	(Finland) Pekka Koskela	10.20
Yu Fengtong skated 9.60 in the first 100 metres of Saturday's 500 metres, which functioned as a qualifying race. Yu, however, did not start in the final, and Oikawa could defend his position as the fastest starting skater. Koskela was given his place in the three-man final heat due to fourth place in qualifying.
December 3, 2006	Harbin, PR China	500 m	(Japan) Keiichiro Nagashima (South Korea) Lee Kyou-hyuk	35.06			(South Korea) Lee Kang-seok	35.29
The first shared victory of the season enabled Nagashima to regain second place in the overall standings, while Lee Kang-seok remained third. Koskela, who had won two races in succession, finished sixth, 0.30 seconds off the pace.
December 3, 2006	Harbin, PR China	1000 m	(South Korea) Lee Kyou-hyuk	1:09.17	(Netherlands) Erben Wennemars	1:09.38	(Netherlands) Stefan Groothuis (South Korea) Mun Jun	1:09.63
Lee Kyou-hyuk completed the weekend with his third win in four races, ahead of four Dutch skaters, though Lee's compatriot Mun Jun squeezed in and split the Dutch contingent. All five Dutch participants finished in the top eight. Davis fell from third to sixth in the overall standings as a result of not competing, while Nijenhuis, who finished fifth in this race, was now third overall.
December 9, 2006	Nagano, Japan	500 m	(Japan) Keiichiro Nagashima	34.91	(South Korea) Lee Kang-seok	35.10	(Finland) Pekka Koskela	35.16
Nagashima's time of 34.91 was the fastest in the World Cup all season, and a new track record in the M-Wave arena. The win moved him ahead of Lee Kyou-hyuk in the overall standings; the Korean had his run of podium positions broken after skating 35.27 and finishing fourth.
December 9, 2006	Nagano, Japan	1000 m	(Finland) Pekka Koskela	1:09.41	(South Korea) Lee Kyou-hyuk	1:09.47	(Netherlands) Erben Wennemars	1:09.73
Koskela's took his first A group victory on the 1000 metres; his best placing in the season thus far was sixth in Heerenveen and Harbin. Koskela was 0.15 seconds behind Lee and 0.02 seconds behind Wennemars after 600 metres, but his last lap brought him to the top of the podium. The winning time was the slowest so far this season, as the race took place without Davis and Morrison. Lee increased his overall standings lead over Wennemars to 70 points.
December 10, 2006	Nagano, Japan	100 m	(Japan) Yūya Oikawa	9.62	(China) Yu Fengtong	9.69	(Finland) Pekka Koskela	9.90
Yu skated 9.61 in the semi-final, but couldn't follow it up and was beaten by Oikawa, also the fastest over 100 metres in yesterday's 500.
December 10, 2006	Nagano, Japan	500 m	(South Korea) Lee Kang-seok	35.09	(Japan) Keiichiro Nagashima (Finland) Pekka Koskela	35.13		
Nagashima faced Koskela in the final pair, after Lee had beaten Tucker Fredricks' leading time by 0.11 seconds and World Cup number two Lee Kyou-hyuk had placed himself fourth with 35.40. Nagashima was 0.06 slower than Lee Kang-seok from the start, and despite a quicker top speed from both skaters, they crossed the line in the same time, 0.04 seconds behind Lee Kang-seok, who took his first World Cup win of the season.
December 10, 2006	Nagano, Japan	1000 m	(Netherlands) Jan Bos	1:09.40	(South Korea) Lee Kyou-hyuk	1:09.62	(Netherlands) Erben Wennemars	1:09.76
Bos' first World Cup victory of the season brought him into third place of the overall standings, while Lee would go into 2007 as World Cup leader of the 1000 metres, extending his lead by a further ten points after defeating Erben Wennemars, despite losing 0.49 of a second on the final lap. Bos skated the fastest final lap of the weekend, in 26.72 seconds.
January 27, 2007	Heerenveen, Netherlands	500 m	(Finland) Pekka Koskela	35.26	(United States) Tucker Fredricks	35.31	(Russia) Dmitry Lobkov	35.46
The second World Cup weekend in Thialf was without the Asians, who competed in the Asian Winter Games in Changchun. Thus, Koskela's win, with the weakest winning time so far this season, was enough to take him to the top of the overall World Cup standings. Fredricks' third podium place of the season was a career-best second place, while Lobkov finished on the podium for the first time in two seasons.
January 27, 2007	Heerenveen, Netherlands	1000 m	(United States) Shani Davis	1:08.91	(Netherlands) Erben Wennemars	1:08.98	(Netherlands) Beorn Nijenhuis	1:09.07
Davis returned to the long track World Cup, having skipped the races in Asia, by equalling the track record with the second best time in the World Cup circuit this season. Wennemars, skating in the final pair, lost 0.21 seconds to Davis in the final lap, and despite skating the third-best time in the World Cup circuit he could only finish second, but drew level with the non-participating Lee Kyou-hyuk in the overall standings.
January 28, 2007	Heerenveen, Netherlands	100 m	(Netherlands) Jan Smeekens	9.84	(Finland) Mika Poutala	9.93	(Poland) Maciej Ustynowicz	10.26
Three of the top four skaters according to yesterday's qualifying time declined to participate, leaving the field open; Ustynowicz posted the best time of the nine invited to qualify for the final, but then failed in the actual race as Smeekens won his first World Cup victory; it was his first placing among the top five.
January 28, 2007	Heerenveen, Netherlands	500 m	(United States) Tucker Fredricks	35.27	(Finland) Pekka Koskela	35.29	(United States) Shani Davis	35.43
Davis competed in his first A group 500 metres of the season, having spent yesterday's race qualifying from the B group. In the second pair, he set a time unbeatable until Fredricks faced Koskela in the final pair of the day. Fredricks stretched his skate out to win by 0.02 seconds, his first World Cup victory, while Koskela's second place gives him a 105-point lead before the final two World Cup races in Calgary. The non-participating Oikawa wins the World Cup overall.
January 28, 2007	Heerenveen, Netherlands	1000 m	(United States) Shani Davis	1:08.98	(Netherlands) Erben Wennemars	1:09.19	(Russia) Yevgeny Lalenkov	1:09.55
In this race, Davis skated after Wennemars, and won his second race in a row despite once again trailing after 600 metres. With three World Cup victories, Davis and Lee Kyou-hyuk had thus won the most races; Wennemars had almost secured the World Cup overall, however, needing only a top-five finish in Calgary. Nijenhuis, yesterday's third-placed skater, does not start owing to an injury, and thus Lalenkov takes his first World Cup podium on the 1000 metres, and his first World Cup podium in any event since 2004.
February 3, 2007	Turin, Italy	1500 m	(Italy) Enrico Fabris	1:44.97	(Netherlands) Erben Wennemars	1:45.06	(Canada) Denny Morrison	1:46.07
The first and second in the overall standings faced off in the final pair, with the third-placed Morrison having taken a one-second lead in the ninth of the ten pairs. He was thus assured of retaining third place; however, Fabris and Wennemars remained in the lead in the overall standings, with Fabris catching up one second on the final lap to win the race by 0.09 seconds and led by virtue of one more victory before the race in Erfurt.
February 3, 2007	Turin, Italy	Team	(Canada) Canada; Arne Dankers; Steven Elm; Denny Morrison	3:46.08	(Russia) Russia; Yevgeny Lalenkov; Ivan Skobrev; Alexey Yunin	3:47.86	(Italy) Italy; Matteo Anesi; Enrico Fabris; Luca Stefani	3:48.22
The first and second in the overall standings faced off in the final pair, with the third-placed Morrison having taken a one-second lead in the ninth of the ten pairs. He was thus assured of retaining third place; however, Fabris and Wennemars remained in the lead in the overall standings, with Fabris catching up one second on the final lap to win the race by 0.09 seconds and led by virtue of one more victory before the race in Erfurt.
February 4, 2007	Turin, Italy	5000 m	(Netherlands) Sven Kramer	6:18.31	(Netherlands) Carl Verheijen	6:18.52	(Norway) Eskil Ervik	6:25.69
Kramer's smallest victory margin this season; he opened a second faster than Verheijen in the first 200 metres, then gradually lost until it was 0.21 seconds in goal. Ervik finished third, but in an earlier pair Fabris skated the last 800 metres in 57.9 seconds, nearly two seconds faster than anyone else. He finished a few tenths of a second behind Ervik, however, and Verheijen thus advanced to second in the overall standings.
February 17, 2007	Erfurt, Germany	10,000 m	(Netherlands) Sven Kramer	12:53.17	(Netherlands) Carl Verheijen	13:03.76	(Netherlands) Brigt Rykkje	13:16.59
With the Norwegians in altitude training in Utah and Fabris skipping the distance to concentrate on the 1500 metres, the Dutch took the top three places on the podium. Kramer skated around the passing times of his new world record from the Heerenveen World Allround Championships for most of the race, but finished three seconds behind, still beating Verheijen's time by more than ten seconds and virtually securing the title. In the B group, Kurt Wubben also skated faster than anyone else.
February 18, 2007	Erfurt, Germany	1500 m	(Italy) Enrico Fabris	1:45.50	(Netherlands) Erben Wennemars	1:45.82	(Netherlands) Mark Tuitert	1:46.60
Fabris finished first ahead of two Dutchmen, giving him a 20-point lead over Wennemars before the World Cup final in Calgary. Once again Fabris trailed after 1100 metres, where he was behind all five Dutchmen, but the final lap of 27.5 was too strong for anyone. Tuitert made his first A group appearance after promoting from the B group in Torino with a second place there, and finished third. All five Dutchmen were among the top eight.
February 18, 2007	Erfurt, Germany	1500 m	(Netherlands) Netherlands; Sven Kramer; Wouter olde Heuvel; Carl Verheijen	3:46.61	(Sweden) Sweden; Joel Eriksson; Daniel Friberg; Johan Röjler	3:48.19	(Japan) Japan; Shingo Doi; Hiroki Hirako; Teruhiro Sugimori	3:49.21
World Cup leaders Canada left out Dankers and Morrison from their team, and promptly fell to seventh place, thus giving the Dutch team, which included long distance No. 1 and No. 2 Kramer and Verheijen, the chance to win the overall World Cup. Sweden and Japan gained their first podium places of the season, as well as team tickets for the World Single Distance Championships.
March 2, 2007	Calgary, Canada	500 m	(United States) Tucker Fredricks	34.64	(Russia) Dmitry Lobkov	34.71	(Japan) Joji Kato (Japan) Keiichiro Nagashima (Finland) Mika Poutala	34.72
March brought a changing of the guard on the 500 metres; of the top four in the World Cup, only Nagashima made the podium, while Poutala, ranked 27th in the overall standings, took his first podium place on an Olympic distance. World Cup leader Koskela finished eleventh, and five skaters were within distance of winning the cup. 12 skaters were within 0.30 seconds of the winner.
March 2, 2007	Calgary, Canada	1000 m	(Canada) Denny Morrison	1:07.24	(United States) Shani Davis	1:07.78	(Russia) Yevgeny Lalenkov	1:07.82
Despite finishing seventh, Wennemars won the World Cup overall, with Korean Lee Kyou-hyuk missing his chance by 0.10 seconds, though he led the race after 600 metres of the final pair. Morrison, who had not competed in the World Cup since November, returned to beat Olympic gold medallist and world record holder Davis by half a second, having the second fastest first 600 and the second fastest finish.
March 3, 2007	Calgary, Canada	500 m	(Japan) Yūya Oikawa	34.42	(South Korea) Lee Kang-seok	34.43	(United States) Tucker Fredricks	34.48
Oikawa's race was the eighth fastest 500 m ever recorded, Lee Kang Seok's the ninth fastest, in times significantly better than the previous day. Oikawa did not have the fastest full lap, but a first 100 m of 9.41 helped him to victory, while Fredricks was second-fastest in 9.54. Nagashima and Fredricks faced off in the final pair for the World Cup title, with Fredricks needing to beat Nagashima by two places to take the title, and the 0.14 seconds was enough to win the Cup for the American.
March 3, 2007	Calgary, Canada	5000 m	(Netherlands) Sven Kramer	6:07.48	(Netherlands) Carl Verheijen	6:12.75	(Italy) Enrico Fabris	6:14.20
Kramer set the first world record of the World Cup season by beating Verheijen by five seconds in head-to-head racing, taking 1.5 seconds on Verheijen in the first 600 metres and gradually increasing the distance between the two. Kramer was ahead of his world record passing times throughout the race, with his smallest lead being 0.2 seconds. For the fifth time this season, Kramer finished first and Verheijen second, thus finishing first and second in the overall standings, and the distance top four was the same as the overall top four.
March 4, 2007	Calgary, Canada	1500 m	(United States) Shani Davis	1:42.32	(Netherlands) Erben Wennemars	1:43.24	(Canada) Denny Morrison	1:43.43
The second world record of the Calgary meet, with Davis beating Chad Hedrick's year-old record from Utah Olympic Oval by 0.46 seconds. Davis was faster than the world record on every lap, except for the last one, where he was 0.01 second slower with a lap of 27.68 seconds. The time stood for the last two pairs. In the final where Wennemars fought Enrico Fabris for the distance title, with both having 440 points before the race. Wennemars set a personal best by 0.27 seconds to beat Fabris by a second.
March 4, 2007	Calgary, Canada	100 m	(Japan) Yūya Oikawa	9.55	(Japan) Joji Kato	9.74	(Poland) Maciej Ustynowicz	9.83
Oikawa set the fastest time in all races, while Yu Fengtong, who finished second to Oikawa in the first qualifying heat, had to see that Kato and Ustynowicz skated slower than he did in the final heat without being able to get better than fourth place. Oikawa thus won the World Cup title, with three of four race victories.

=== Women ===
Date	Place	Dist.	Winner	Time	Second	Time	Third	Time
November 10, 2006	Heerenveen, Netherlands	500 m	(South Korea) Lee Sang-hwa	38.23	(Germany) Jenny Wolf	38.60	(China) Wang Beixing	38.70
The opening race of the World Cup season was won by a 17-year-old Korean, her first win in an Olympic distance. Her pairmate Jenny Wolf skated well enough to finish second, while 2005 World Single Distance silver medallist Wang Beixing took third.
November 10, 2006	Heerenveen, Netherlands	1000 m	(Germany) Anni Friesinger	1:15.89	(Canada) Christine Nesbitt	1:16.08	(Netherlands) Ireen Wüst	1:16.63
Friesinger, holder of two World Cups (1000 and 1500 metres), held on in the last pair despite losing 0.65 of a second to Nesbitt, who got her highest World Cup placing ever, on the final lap.
November 11, 2006	Heerenveen, Netherlands	500 m	(China) Wang Beixing	38.26	(South Korea) Lee Sang-hwa	38.33	(Germany) Jenny Wolf	38.41
Wang took her second career World Cup victory, setting a time of 38.26 in the penultimate pair which was just too strong for the Korean, whose opening 100 metres was 0.14 seconds worse than in the previous day's race. Lee defended her lead in the overall World Cup, however, and once again beat Wolf in a pair.
November 11, 2006	Heerenveen, Netherlands	1500 m	(Germany) Anni Friesinger	1:56.90	(Canada) Christine Nesbitt	1:56.95	(Netherlands) Ireen Wüst	1:57.31
The exact same podium as in yesterday's 1000 metres. Once again, Friesinger lost to Nesbitt on the final lap, though only 0.1 seconds this time. Wüst lost over a second to Nesbitt on the second and third laps.
November 12, 2006	Heerenveen, Netherlands	1000 m	(Germany) Anni Friesinger	1:15.93	(Canada) Christine Nesbitt	1:16.15	(Netherlands) Ireen Wüst	1:16.92
For the third time that weekend, the podium was made up of Friesinger, Nesbitt and Wüst in that order. All posted slightly weaker times than in Friday's race, though once more it was Nesbitt who had the best last lap. Wüst caught up 0.81 seconds on Marianne Timmer on the final lap to finish 0.05 seconds ahead.
November 12, 2006	Heerenveen, Netherlands	3000 m	(Netherlands) Renate Groenewold	4:05.45	(Netherlands) Ireen Wüst	4:06.56	(Czech Republic) Martina Sáblíková	4:06.89
Wüst, the Olympic champion on this distance, improved to second place as neither Nesbitt nor Friesinger took part on the 3000 metres; however, compatriot Renate Groenewold, who was pipped to the Olympic silver, beat her in the last pair. Wüst skated in pair with Sábliková, leading for almost the whole race, though she did lose 0.67 of a second on the final lap.
November 17, 2006	Berlin, Germany	500 m	(Germany) Jenny Wolf	37.77	(South Korea) Lee Sang-hwa	38.01	(China) Wang Beixing	38.11
2006 World Cup winner Wolf set the fastest time in the second-to-last pair, beating World Cup leader Lee Sang-hwa by 0.24 seconds after Lee had taken the lead by almost half a second and set a new fastest time for the World Cup this season. In the final pair, Wang Beixing skated to the third-best time, while fifth-ranked Hui Ren finished ninth after an opening time which only was better than two of 20 other skaters.
November 17, 2006	Berlin, Germany	1500 m	(Germany) Anni Friesinger	1:55.54	(Netherlands) Ireen Wüst	1:56.18	(Canada) Christine Nesbitt	1:56.77
The fourth Friesinger–Wüst–Nesbitt podium this season, though Nesbitt gave away a lead to Wüst on the final lap. Skating in the final pair, Nesbitt was half a second behind Friesinger before going up 2.7 seconds on the final lap to fall down to third place. Friesinger's win was her fourth this season, and her largest by samalog points.
November 18, 2006	Berlin, Germany	500 m	(Germany) Jenny Wolf	38.12	(South Korea) Lee Sang-hwa	38.18	(China) Wang Beixing	38.25
The same podium as the day before, though with worse times. Wolf took over the lead in the aggregate World Cup standings after her second race win in as many days. In the final pair, she was behind both Lee Sang-hwa and pairmate Aihua Xing after 100 metres, but caught up on the final lap to win by 0.06 seconds.
November 18, 2006	Berlin, Germany	3000 m	(Netherlands) Renate Groenewold	4:02.44	(Canada) Kristina Groves	4:03.04	(Netherlands) Ireen Wüst	4:04.01
Groenewold won the 3000 metres for the second time in as many weeks. Groves and Wüst, who skated together in the final pair, were ahead of Groenewold's passing times until the final lap. However, both finished with laps above 33 seconds, losing to Groenewold's final lap of 32.78.
November 19, 2006	Berlin, Germany	1000 m	(Germany) Anni Friesinger	1:15.53	(Netherlands) Ireen Wüst	1:16.13	(Canada) Christine Nesbitt	1:16.30
Friesinger won for the fifth time in five starts this season, and the time was her best on this distance this season. Wüst skated in the same pair as Nesbitt, beating her for the first time on the 1000 metres this season, after bettering her times from Heerenveen by over half a second. She trailed Nesbitt by two tenths of a second before the final lap, but her last lap of 29.30 seconds was the best of the afternoon, and also 0.7 seconds better than Friesinger.
November 19, 2006	Berlin, Germany	Team pursuit	(Netherlands) Netherlands; Paulien van Deutekom; Renate Groenewold; Ireen Wüst	3:02.90	(Canada) Canada; Kristina Groves; Christine Nesbitt; Shannon Rempel	3:04.07	(Germany) Germany; Daniela Anschütz-Thoms; Lucille Opitz; Claudia Pechstein	3:04.76
Olympic champions Germany, without Friesinger, finished third as Wüst got her first win of the season, along with long distance World Cup leader Groenewold. The Dutch had set the benchmark in the second of the four pairs, and the Canadians – who trailed Germany at the halfway stage – could only complete the second half in the same speed as the Dutch, thus finishing 1.1 seconds down.
November 25, 2006	Moscow, Russia	5000 m	(Germany) Claudia Pechstein	7:04.95	(Germany) Daniela Anschütz-Thoms	7:05.36	(Czech Republic) Martina Sáblíková	7:06.01
2002 Olympic silver medallist Gretha Smit won the B group in a time of 7:01.25, faster than anyone in the A group. None of the top three skaters in the aggregate standings (Groenewold, Wüst, Groves) competed in the race. Anschütz-Thoms was within 0.01 seconds of Pechstein with 800 metres to go, but faded away; in the last pair Sábliková, the best ranked of the competing skaters, opened slowly and could not catch the two Germans.
November 26, 2006	Moscow, Russia	1500 m	(Germany) Anni Friesinger	1:56.40	(Canada) Christine Nesbitt	1:58.04	(Germany) Daniela Anschütz-Thoms	1:59.77
Friesinger extended her run of victories to six, and in the absence of Wüst, Anschütz-Thoms made it into third place, though she was beaten by more than three seconds, the largest distance between first and third in the World Cup this season measured in samalog points.
December 2, 2006	Harbin, PR China	500 m	(South Korea) Lee Sang-hwa	38.23	(Germany) Jenny Wolf	38.30	(China) Wang Beixing	38.32
Lee Sang-hwa prevented Jenny Wolf from taking her third straight win at the 500 metres, pipping her by 0.07 seconds to overtake Wolf in the World Cup overall standings. She had a 10-point advantage before the second day's race.
December 2, 2006	Harbin, PR China	1000 m	(Italy) Chiara Simionato	1:16.99	(Netherlands) Marianne Timmer	1:17.63	(China) Wang Beixing	1:17.64
With all of the top four skaters in the World Cup rankings not competing, seventh-ranked Chiara Simionato made her first top-3 spot of the season a win. The time would not have been good enough for a podium place in any of the other World Cup races so far this season, though. She finished 0.64 in front of second placed Marianne Timmer who finished in 1:17.63, just 0.01 in front of Wang Beixing. Wang Fei missed out on the podium, a further 0.01 seconds back.
December 3, 2006	Harbin, PR China	100 m	(China) Xing Aihua	10.31 WR	(Germany) Jenny Wolf	10.41	(South Korea) Lee Sang-hwa	10.59
Wolf was fastest on the opening 100 in Saturday's 500 metre race, but was beaten by Xing, whose 10.31 was tied with Svetlana Zhurova's three-year-old world record. Lee's time was beaten by Wang Beixing in the B final.
December 3, 2006	Harbin, PR China	500 m	(Germany) Jenny Wolf	38.41	(South Korea) Lee Sang-hwa	38.47	(China) Wang Beixing	38.59
Wolf was drawn against Lee in the final pair, and held on to her 100m advantage despite Lee's attack from the outer lane. In the second to last pair, Wang opened in identical time to Aihua Xing, but beat her by 0.16 seconds after the final curve.
December 3, 2006	Harbin, PR China	1000 m	(Italy) Chiara Simionato	1:17.14	(Netherlands) Marianne Timmer	1:17.65	(Netherlands) Annette Gerritsen	1:17.78
Though the gap was narrowed from yesterday's race, Simionato still won by 0.51 seconds, while Gerritsen got her first podium place in the A group. Simionato thus took over the overall World Cup lead from Anni Friesinger, despite the latter being unbeaten all season on any distance.
December 9, 2006	Nagano, Japan	500 m	(South Korea) Lee Sang-hwa	38.52	(Germany) Jenny Wolf	38.71	(Netherlands) Margot Boer	38.81
Lee and Wolf occupied the top two places for the fifth successive time this season, while the absence of Beixing Wang, five-time third-place finisher this season, opened a chance for others. Boer, who was ranked 13th overall before this race, skated the fastest last lap of the day with 27.94 (shared with Lee) to take her first career podium place.
December 9, 2006	Nagano, Japan	1000 m	(Canada) Shannon Rempel	1:16.88	(Italy) Chiara Simionato	1:17.23	(Japan) Nao Kodaira	1:17.53
Simionato, who won two World Cup victories in Harbin, extended her overall lead to 58 points despite being beaten by Rempel, who won her first World Cup race and was on the podium for the first time in two seasons. Simionato had to start alone in the final pair, as Ren Hui did not start.
December 10, 2006	Nagano, Japan	100 m	(Germany) Judith Hesse	10.51	(South Korea) Lee Sang-hwa	10.65	(Russia) Svetlana Kaykan	10.66
Hesse's first place in the top six of a World Cup race was a win; the time of 10.51 was only beaten in the semi-final by Lee Sang-hwa, and she was beaten in the final race. Lee takes over the lead in the overall World Cup, as the winner from Harbin, Xing Aihua, did not take part.
December 10, 2006	Nagano, Japan	500 m	(South Korea) Lee Sang-hwa	38.30	(Germany) Jenny Wolf	38.32	(Japan) Sayuri Yoshii	38.74
Lee takes Wolf from the last inner lane, winning by 0.02 seconds to extend her lead in the overall World Cup. Yoshii's best placing in this season's World Cup before this race was 11th, but after skating the third-fastest opening she takes third place.
December 10, 2006	Nagano, Japan	1000 m	(Italy) Chiara Simionato	1:17.14	(Netherlands) Marianne Timmer	1:17.33	(Canada) Shannon Rempel	1:17.69
Simionato back on top, as yesterday's winner Rempel was slower on the first 200 and the final lap. The positions in the race were identical to the positions in the overall World Cup standings; the undefeated Friesinger was now fourth.
January 27, 2007	Heerenveen, Netherlands	500 m	(Germany) Jenny Wolf	38.16	(Russia) Svetlana Kaykan	38.62	(Netherlands) Annette Gerritsen	38.99
Five of the top six in the World Cup did not participate; four Asians due to the Asian Winter Games and Timmer due to illness. Thus, Wolf took victory by the largest margin on the 500 metres thus far this season. Gerritsen finished on the podium for the first time this season, having sixth and eighth place as their best so far, while Kaykan went one better than at the World Sprint Championships for her first World Cup podium.
January 27, 2007	Heerenveen, Netherlands	1000 m	(Canada) Cindy Klassen	1:16.53	(Germany) Anni Friesinger	1:16.70	(Italy) Chiara Simionato	1:17.23
Klassen's first World Cup race this season ended in victory, with Friesinger recording a time more than 1.5 seconds poorer than at the World Sprints in Hamar a week before, thus losing a World Cup race for the first time this season. World Cup leader Simionato is best of the rest, but stretches her overall lead to 124 points.
January 28, 2007	Heerenveen, Netherlands	100 m	(China) Xing Aihua	10.31	(Germany) Judith Hesse	10.74	(Japan) Sayuri Yoshii	11.08
Germans Wolf and Hesse faced off in the final for the World Cup title, with fourth-placed Kaykan declining to start and first-placed Lee competing in China. Wolf won the race, and also set a personal best by skating the third-fastest time ever.
January 28, 2007	Heerenveen, Netherlands	500 m	(Netherlands) Annette Gerritsen	38.93	(Italy) Chiara Simionato	38.97	(Netherlands) Margot Boer	39.00
With no Kaykan and a fall from Wolf, Gerritsen wins her first World Cup race ever; before this weekend her best placing on the distance had been eighth. However, the time of 38.93 would only have been enough for a podium place in one of the nine previous World Cup races. Wolf's fall means Lee was trailing by 72 points before the two final races, meaning Wolf would have to make two second places to be assured of overall victory.
January 28, 2007	Heerenveen, Netherlands	1000 m	(Germany) Anni Friesinger	1:15.97	(Canada) Cindy Klassen	1:16.02	(Netherlands) Margot Boer	1:17.27
Friesinger and Klassen skated in the final pair, and were in a class of their own, Friesinger thus went 3–1 up in meets between the two skaters, though Klassen won the aggregate for the day. Simionato, who finished fourth, now required only a top-30 finish in the final race in Calgary to win, while Boer got her first 1000-meter podium.
February 3, 2007	Turin, Italy	3000 m	(Czech Republic) Martina Sáblíková	4:03.88	(Netherlands) Ireen Wüst	4:04.40	(Canada) Cindy Klassen	4:05.51
Sáblíková took over the lead in the distance standings with her first World Cup win of the season. Skating in the first pair against Olympic 5,000 metre gold medallist Clara Hughes, who also made a return to the World Cup, Klassen set a time of 4:05.51 despite finishing with a lap of 35 seconds, the second-worst of the day. It took until the ninth pair to beat it, when Wüst faced distance World Cup leader Anschütz-Thoms, and Wüst kept just ahead of Klassen for the entire race. Then, in the final pair, Sáblíková overtook Groenewold with two laps to go; Groenewold tired, while Sábliková's final 32.4 was more than half a second better than anyone else.
February 4, 2007	Turin, Italy	1500 m	(Netherlands) Ireen Wüst	1:55.01	(Germany) Anni Friesinger	1:56.16	(Canada) Cindy Klassen	1:56.38
Having skipped the 3000 metres, Friesinger made it 4–1 against Klassen, but was nevertheless distanced by almost a second by Wüst, whose 1500 was more than half a second better than Friesinger had made thus far this season. Wüst showed strength before the World Allround Championships at home in Heerenveen the following week, and advanced to third in the overall standings.
February 4, 2007	Turin, Italy	Team pursuit	(Russia) Russia; Yekaterina Abramova; Galina Likhachova; Yekaterina Lobysheva	3:06.21	(Canada) Canada; Kristina Groves; Christine Nesbitt; Brittany Schussler	3:06.26	(Netherlands) Netherlands; Wieteke Cramer; Moniek Kleinsman; Jorien Voorhuis	3:07.36
None of the first four in the overall 1500 metre World Cup competed in this race, which was won by Russia for the first time after a quick opening, leading by one second over any competitors after three laps. The Netherlands team, who finished third after failing to keep up with Canada in the final two laps, remained in the lead in the overall World Cup.
February 17, 2007	Erfurt, Germany	1500 m	(Germany) Anni Friesinger	1:56.10	(Netherlands) Ireen Wüst	1:56.59	(Canada) Kristina Groves	1:57.13
After successive defeats to Wüst in Turin and at the World Allround, Friesinger responded by winning on home soil and taking an almost unassailable 150-point lead into the World Cup final in Canada. Friesinger skated in the last pair, and skated a race almost even with Friesinger, except for the last lap which went by in 31.59 seconds, the second-fastest of the day. Canadians Nesbitt and Klassen skipped the meet.
February 18, 2007	Erfurt, Germany	5000 m	(Czech Republic) Martina Sáblíková	6:50.39	(Germany) Claudia Pechstein	6:57.68	(Germany) Daniela Anschütz-Thoms	7:00.49
Sáblíková repeated her feat from the Heerenveen World Allround, winning by more than five seconds, though Pechstein was considerably closer than in Heerenveen. Pechstein skated in the last pair, but despite skating a flat race with no lap times above 33.5 she could not beat the 19-year-old Czech, who could win the distance World Cup with a fifth place or better in the final in Calgary.
February 18, 2007	Erfurt, Germany	Team	(Germany) Germany; Daniela Anschütz-Thoms; Claudia Pechstein; Lucille Opitz	3:03.89	(Russia) Russia; Yekaterina Abramova; Galina Likhachova; Yekaterina Lobysheva	3:04.85	(Netherlands) Netherlands; Wieteke Cramer; Jorien Voorhuis; Ireen Wüst	3:07.23
Russia skated a second and a half better than in Turin, and led for five of the six laps; however, the German long-distance specialists went past on the final lap. The Dutch finished third, still without van Deutekom or Groenewold, but won the World Cup overall.
March 2, 2007	Calgary, Canada	500 m	(China) Wang Beixing	37.61	(Germany) Jenny Wolf	37.72	(Japan) Sayuri Osuga	37.83
Wang, who had skipped several meets to win gold on this distance at the 2007 Asian Winter Games, now took her first victory at an ISU-organised event since November. Wolf won the World Cup for the second season running, as her only competitor Lee Sang-hwa finished seventh, while Osuga pipped Shihomi Shinya by 0.01 seconds for her first podium place since November 2005.
March 2, 2007	Calgary, Canada	1000 m	(Netherlands) Ireen Wüst	1:13.86	(Canada) Christine Nesbitt	1:14.42	(Canada) Kristina Groves	1:14.51
Wüst had competed in five ISU-organised 1000 metres this season, and finished on the podium behind Friesinger at all times. However, Friesinger was absent due to illness, and Wüst used the opportunity to skate the fourth-fastest all-time 1000 metre. Four Canadians finished among the top six.
March 3, 2007	Calgary, Canada	500 m	(China) Wang Beixing	37.32	(Japan) Sayuri Osuga	37.66	(Germany) Jenny Wolf	37.71
Wang took her third win of the season, one fewer than Wolf and Lee, while Osuga and Wolf swapped places after Wolf skated a slower opening 100 metre than yesterday. After her two podium places, Osuga finished fourth in the distance rankings.
March 3, 2007	Calgary, Canada	1500 m	(Netherlands) Ireen Wüst	1:52.38	(Canada) Kristina Groves	1:53.58	(Canada)	1:53.80
As in the 1000 metres, it was Wüst ahead of the Canadians, as the World Allround Champion skated the third-fastest 1500 metre race of all time, passing the absent Anni Friesinger on the all-time distance list and in the overall World Cup standings for the season. Wüst was fastest on all laps except the second.
March 4, 2007	Calgary, Canada	3000 m	(Czech Republic) Martina Sáblíková	3:57.04	(Germany) Daniela Anschütz-Thoms	3:58.59	(Canada) Kristina Groves	3:58.62
With two laps to go, Sáblíková was fifth, but as she was one of only two to skate the final lap below 32 seconds, she took the victory and the distance Cup title, as well as a runner-up place in the world all-time list to Cindy Klassen. Anschütz-Thoms needed to beat Groenewold and Pechstein to take second place in the overall standings, and did so despite trailing Groenewold for the first two thirds of their race.
March 4, 2007	Calgary, Canada	100 m	(Germany) Jenny Wolf	10.28 WR	(Japan) Sayuri Osuga	10.46	(South Korea) Lee Sang-hwa	10.49
Wolf set a world record time in the final to win the World Cup title. Two Germans finished on top overall, with Judith Hesse winning the B final to finish second.

== Men's overall results ==
=== 100 m ===
Final standings after 4 of 4 races. Oikawa won despite missing the final race due to participation in the 2007 Asian Winter Games; Koskela opted out of the final race, though a place in the final would have won him the World Cup.

Pos.	Skater	Har	Nag	Hee	Cal	Points
1.	(Japan) Yūya Oikawa	100	100		150	350
2.	(Poland) Maciej Ustynowicz	40	32	70	105	247
3.	(Finland) Pekka Koskela	70	70	28	40	208
4.	(Japan) Joji Kato	36	45		120	201
5.	(China) Yu Fengtong	28	80		90	198
6.	(Japan) Tadashi Obara	50	50	50	45	195
7.	(Finland) Mika Poutala	13	20	80	75	188
8.	(Netherlands) Jan Smeekens	17	22	100		139
9.	(China) An Weijiang	60	60			120
10.	(Italy) Ermanno Ioriatti	11	10	60	36	117
11.	(South Korea) Lee Kang-seok	80	26			106
12.	(Canada) Mike Ireland	13	40	22		75
13.	(Netherlands) Gerard van Velde	11	13	45		69
14.	(United States) Tucker Fredricks	24	18	26		68
15.	(Germany) Anton Hahn	9	7	14	32	62

=== 500 m ===
Final standings after 12 of 12 races. The top 15 skaters are listed, as well as those with a top-six placing in a race.

Pos.	Skater	Heer 1	Heer 2	Ber 1	Ber 2	Harb 1	Harb 2	Nag 1	Nag 2	Heer 3	Heer 4	Cal 1	Cal 2	Points
1.	(United States) Tucker Fredricks	32	50	70	60	50	40	28	60	80	100	150	105	825
2.	(Japan) Keiichiro Nagashima	100	100	60	45	60	100	100	80			105	75	825
3.	(Finland) Pekka Koskela	60	70	45	100	100	45	70	80	100	80	26	22	798
4.	(South Korea) Lee Kang-seok	80	60	80	80	80	70	80	100			28	120	778
5.	(South Korea) Lee Kyou-hyuk	70	80	100	70	70	100	60	45			40	28	663
6.	(Russia) Dmitry Lobkov	5	26	25	40	24	32	21	40	70	50	120	45	498
7.	(China) Yu Fengtong	40	45	32	60	45	60	50	21			36	90	479
8.	(Japan) Yūya Oikawa	50	32	18	36	40	28	40	24			22	150	440
9.	(Japan) Joji Kato	36	36	50	28	28	21	50	36			105	45	435
10.	(Canada) Mike Ireland	12	32	36	3	14	28	32	50	24	32	24	32	319
11.	(United States) Kip Carpenter	14	20	21	4	16	36	18	32	50	40	32	17	300
12.	(Netherlands) Jan Smeekens	45	18	40	21	18	18	14	12	40	32	6	36	300
13.	(Netherlands) Erben Wennemars		40	18	24	32	16	12	16	60	36	17		271
14.	(Japan) Tadashi Obara	20	24	6	18	36	14	40	8	14	60	8	22	270
15.	(Netherlands) Gerard van Velde	20	18	24	14	10	8	8	10	36	45	18	15	226
16.	(Finland) Mika Poutala	13	5			8	19	5	5	18		105	26	204
17.	(Canada) Brock Miron	16	13	11	19		2	25	14	45	21	11	11	188
21.	(China) Zhang Zhongqi	14	13	14	36	12	50							139
23.	(South Korea) Mun Jun					25	12	16				45	22	120
28.	(United States) Shani Davis									19	70			89

=== 1000 m ===
Final standings after 10 of 10 races.

Pos.	Skater	Heer 1	Heer 2	Ber 1	Harb 1	Harb 2	Nag 1	Nag 2	Heer 3	Heer 4	Cal 1	Points
1.	(Netherlands) Erben Wennemars	70	60	100	80	80	70	70	80	80	40	730
2.	(South Korea) Lee Kyou-hyuk	100	80	70	100	100	80	80			90	700
3.	(United States) Shani Davis	60	100	60					100	100	120	540
4.	(Netherlands) Jan Bos	50	40	45	40	45	60	100	36	50	36	502
5.	(Netherlands) Stefan Groothuis	40	50	8	50	70	45	45	45	60	26	439
6.	(Netherlands) Beorn Nijenhuis	80	20	36	70	50	21	21	70		28	396
7.	(Finland) Pekka Koskela	45	26	28	45	40	100	60	24		16	384
8.	(South Korea) Mun Jun	36	36	80	28	70	50	32			32	364
9.	(Canada) François-Olivier Roberge	32	28	40	60	32	18	28	40	28	18	324
10.	(Russia) Yevgeny Lalenkov	20	45						60	70	105	300
11.	(Canada) Denny Morrison	26	70	50							150	296
12.	(United States) Kip Carpenter	9	15	25	32	24	45	28	16	32	45	271
13.	(Russia) Alexey Proshin	13	14	16	8	12	36	12	36	45	22	214
14.	(Russia) Dmitry Lobkov	11	9	19	36	28	16	40	28		20	207
15.	(Canada) Brock Miron		14	14	21	18	32	50	18	21	12	200
17.	(Norway) Even Wetten	15	12	32					50	36	1	146
19.	(Netherlands) Simon Kuipers								25	40	75	140

=== 1500 m ===
Final standings after 6 of 6 races.

Pos.	Skater	Heer	Ber	Mosc	Tur	Erf	Cal	Points
1.	(Netherlands) Erben Wennemars	100	80	100	80	80	120	560
2.	(Italy) Enrico Fabris	60	100	80	100	100	36	476
3.	(Canada) Denny Morrison	40	45	45	70		105	305
4.	(United States) Shani Davis	80	70				150	300
5.	(Russia) Yevgeniy Lalenkov	26	50	21	60	60	26	243
6.	(Netherlands) Jan Bos	70	18		50	50	28	216
7.	(Netherlands) Simon Kuipers	50	8		45		90	193
8.	(Canada) Steven Elm	20	21	24	24	28	22	139
9.	(Netherlands) Stefan Groothuis				25	36	75	136
10.	(South Korea) Mun Jun	36	60				40	136
11.	(Netherlands) Mark Tuitert				19	70	45	134
12.	(Germany) Tobias Schneider	20	28	18	36		16	118
13.	(Poland) Konrad Niedźwiedzki	18	32	28		21	13	112
14.	(Canada) François-Olivier Roberge	22	16		40	5	24	107
15.	(Netherlands) Beorn Nijenhuis			60		45		105
16.	(Russia) Ivan Skobrev	28	5	70				103
17.	(Germany) Stefan Heythausen	7		50	14	16	11	98
22.	(Netherlands) Sven Kramer	45	40					85

=== 5000/10000 m ===
Final standings after 6 of 6 races.

Pos.	Skater	Heer	Ber	Mosc 10k	Tur	Erf 10k	Cal	Points
1.	(Netherlands) Sven Kramer	100	100		100	100	100	500
2.	(Netherlands) Carl Verheijen	80	80		80	80	80	400
3.	(Italy) Enrico Fabris	45	60	100	60		70	335
4.	(Norway) Eskil Ervik	70	70	20	70		60	290
5.	(Netherlands) Bob de Jong	50	50	60	24	45	36	265
6.	(Norway) Øystein Grødum	26	40	70	40	60	20	256
7.	(Germany) Tobias Schneider	40	32	80	45	20	14	231
8.	(Canada) Arne Dankers	32	36	35	50		50	203
9.	(Netherlands) Brigt Rykkje	20	16	50	12	70	32	200
10.	(Norway) Håvard Bøkko	60	28	30			45	163
11.	(Norway) Odd Borgersen	22	18	45	8	50	4	147
12.	(Japan) Hiroki Hirako	17	24	25	21	35	16	138
13.	(Germany) Marco Weber	8	15	21	10	40	24	118
14.	(Sweden) Johan Röjler	16	12	8	28	25	18	107
15.	(United States) Shani Davis	36	45				22	103

=== Team pursuit ===
Final standings after 3 of 3 races.

Pos.	Team	Skaters used	Ber	Tur	Erf	Points
1.	Netherlands	Kramer, R. olde Heuvel, W. olde Heuvel, Ritsma, Prinsen, Verheijen, Wennemars	100	36	100	236
2.	Canada	Dankers, Elm, Morrison, Warsylewicz, Makowsky	70	100	40	210
3.	Germany	Heythausen, Lehmann, Schneider, Weber	50	60	60	170
4.	Italy	Anesi, Donagrandi, Fabris, Stefani	45	70	50	165
5.	Sweden	Eriksson, Friberg, Röjler	40	40	80	160
6.	Japan	Dejima, Doi, Hirako, Otoge, Sugimori	60	28	70	158
7.	Russia	Belousov, Lalenkov, Shepel, Skobrev, Yunin	32	80	45	157
8.	Norway	Bøkko, Christiansen, Ervik, Haugli, Johansen, Rukke, van der Horst	80	45	21	146
9.	United States	Dyrud, Hedrick, Leveille, Stewart, Loquai	36	50	28	114
10.	Poland	Chmura, Druszkiewicz, Kustra, Mazur, Niedźwiedzki	28	32	36	96
11.	Belarus	Smirnov, Mikhailov, Vysotski	16		24	40
12.	France	Loy, Contin, Briand			32	32
13.	China	Yue, Xuefeng, Xin	24			24
14.	Kazakhstan	Babenko, Kostin, Zhigin	21			21
15.	Romania	Grozea, Ionescu, Pop	18			18
16.	Czech Republic	Haselberger, Kulma, Sáblík	14			14

== Women's overall results ==
=== 100 m ===
Final standings after 4 of 4 races.

Pos.	Skater	Har	Nag	Hee	Cal	Points
1.	(Germany) Jenny Wolf	80	60	100	150	390
2.	(Germany) Judith Hesse	40	100	80	90	310
3.	(South Korea) Lee Sang-hwa	70	80		105	255
4.	(Japan) Sayuri Osuga	50	50		120	220
5.	(Russia) Svetlana Kaykan	32	70	28	75	205
6.	(Netherlands) Annette Gerritsen	36	36	60		132
7.	(Italy) Chiara Simionato	10	32	45	45	132
8.	(Japan) Sayuri Yoshii	14	45	70		129
9.	(China) Xing Aihua	100				100
10.	(Sweden) Paulina Wallin			50	40	90
11.	(Canada) Kim Weger	16	18	40		74
12.	(China) Zhang Shuang	21	40			61
13.	(China) Wang Beixing	60				60
14.	(Japan) Tomomi Okazaki	28	24			52
15.	(Canada) Krisy Myers	3	8	36		47

=== 500 m ===
Final standings after 12 races. The top 15 skaters are listed, as well as those with a top-six placing in a race.

Pos.	Skater	Heer 1	Heer 2	Ber 1	Ber 2	Harb 1	Harb 2	Nag 1	Nag 2	Heer 3	Heer 4	Cal 1	Cal 2	Points
1.	(Germany) Jenny Wolf	80	70	100	100	80	100	80	80	100	2	120	105	1017
2.	(South Korea) Lee Sang-hwa	100	80	80	80	100	80	100	100			40	75	835
3.	(China) Wang Beixing	70	100	70	70	70	70					150	150	750
4.	(Japan) Sayuri Osuga	32	45	45	50	40	50	50	60			105	120	597
5.	(Netherlands) Annette Gerritsen	28	36	24	16	21	21	16	24	70	100	75	36	467
6.	(Italy) Chiara Simionato	20	28	36	32	24	28	36	50	50	80	18	32	434
7.	(China) Xing Aihua	60	60	60	45	60	60					36	40	421
8.	(Netherlands) Margot Boer	50	40	28	6	5		70	36	60	70	16	24	405
9.	(Russia) Svetlana Kaykan	13	22	21	8	36	36	36	45	80		45	28	370
10.	(China) Ren Hui	45	50	32	60	45	24	45				22	18	341
11.	(Japan) Sayuri Yoshii	24	18	21	18	10	14	24	70	45	21	28	26	319
12.	(Japan) Nao Kodaira	26	17	14	10	14	16	60	28	28	50	17	16	296
13.	(Canada) Shannon Rempel	18	20	6	28	18	10	40	21	40	28	24	20	273
14.	(Netherlands) Marianne Timmer	40	36	50	28	16	40	21	40					271
15.	(Japan) Tomomi Okazaki	15	26	12	21	32	45	14	18			26	45	254
18.	(Germany) Pamela Zöllner	22	24	8	14	3				32	50	14	17	204
19.	(Japan) Shihomi Shinya											90	90	180
20.	(United States) Elli Ochowicz	15	13	19	5					36	60	10	7	165
22.	(China) Shang Zhuang					50	18	28	36					132

=== 1000 m ===
Final standings after 10 races.

Many skaters skipped the races in Harbin and Nagano, where nearly 40% of the available points were up for grabs. The overall World Cup winner, Chiara Simionato, was defeated by Anni Friesinger, Ireen Wüst, Christine Nesbitt or Cindy Klassen in all races in which the four took part. Friesinger won four of her five races during the season, taking the most wins.

Pos.	Skater	Heer 1	Heer 2	Ber 1	Harb 1	Harb 2	Nag 1	Nag 2	Heer 3	Heer 4	Cal 1	Points
1.	(Italy) Chiara Simionato	60	26	36	100	100	80	100	70	60	40	672
2.	(Canada) Shannon Rempel	45	28	50	50	60	100	70	45	36	45	529
3.	(Germany) Anni Friesinger	100	100	100					80	100		480
4.	(Netherlands) Marianne Timmer	40	60	24	80	80	60	80				424
5.	(Netherlands) Annette Gerritsen	26	24	40	45	70	36	28	50	50	32	401
6.	(Netherlands) Ireen Wüst	70	70	80							150	370
7.	(Canada) Christine Nesbitt	80	80	70							120	350
8.	(Japan) Sayuri Yoshii	17	15	18	18	32	40	60	18	18	36	272
9.	(Canada) Kristina Groves	50	50	60							105	265
10.	(Japan) Nao Kodaira	16	18	21	36	36	70	40	5	12	10	264
11.	(Canada) Cindy Klassen								100	80	75	255
12.	(Netherlands) Margot Boer	28	40	32	12				60	70	12	254
13.	(South Korea) Lee Sang-hwa	36	20	28	40	32	50	32			9	247
14.	(China) Wang Beixing	32	45	45	70	40						232
15.	(China) Wang Fei			25	60	50					90	225
17.	(Russia) Svetlana Kaykan		14	5	14	18	24	45	32		13	165
18.	(China) Ren Hui	24	36	14	16	45	0				14	149
19.	(Japan) Maki Tabata	22		8			45	50			17	142
20.	(Canada) Brittany Schussler	9	13	15					36	45	18	136

=== 1500 m ===
Final standings after 6 races.

Due to winning the final race, Wüst finished ahead of Friesinger, though Friesinger accumulated four wins to Wüst's two during the season.

Pos.	Skater	Heer	Ber	Mosc	Tur	Erf	Cal	Points
1.	(Netherlands) Ireen Wüst	70	80		100	80	150	480
2.	(Germany) Anni Friesinger	100	100	100	80	100		480
3.	(Canada) Kristina Groves	60	60		60	70	120	370
4.	(Canada) Christine Nesbitt	80	70	80	50		36	316
5.	(Germany) Daniela Anschütz-Thoms	50	28	70	36	50	32	266
6.	(Netherlands) Paulien van Deutekom	45	50		45	32	45	217
7.	(Czech Republic) Martina Sáblíková	20	8	24	21	60	75	208
8.	(Canada) Cindy Klassen				70		105	175
9.	(China) Wang Fei	36	40				90	166
10.	(Poland) Katarzyna Wójcicka	28	16	60	28	21	9	162
11.	(Japan) Maki Tabata	26	24	40		28	40	158
12.	(Netherlands) Marja Vis			25	40	45	24	134
13.	(Germany) Claudia Pechstein	32		45	32			109
14.	(Netherlands) Jorien Voorhuis			11	25	40	22	98
15.	(Canada) Shannon Rempel	24	45				28	97
16.	(Russia) Yekaterina Abramova	16	18	50			12	96

=== 3000/5000 m ===
Final standings after 6 races.

Pos.	Skater	Heer	Ber	Mosc 5k	Tur	Erf 5k	Cal	Points
1.	(Czech Republic) Martina Sáblíková	70	50	70	100	100	150	540
2.	(Germany) Daniela Anschütz-Thoms	60	60	80	36	70	120	426
3.	(Germany) Claudia Pechstein	36	36	100	60	80	90	402
4.	(Netherlands) Renate Groenewold	100	100		50	60	45	355
5.	(Canada) Kristina Groves	50	80		40	45	105	320
6.	(Netherlands) Ireen Wüst	80	70		80			230
7.	(Netherlands) Marja Vis	32	40	60	21	50	20	223
8.	(United States) Catherine Raney	45	16	50	28	25	18	182
9.	(Netherlands) Paulien van Deutekom	28	45		32		75	180
10.	(Norway) Maren Haugli	45	28	30	18		26	147
11.	(Japan) Maki Tabata	14	25	35		30	32	136
12.	(Russia) Svetlana Vysokova	15	19	25	5	40	15	119
13.	(Poland) Katarzyna Wójcicka	22	24	20	24	15	9	114
14.	(Canada) Cindy Klassen				70		40	110
15.	(Netherlands) Gretha Smit			35	14	30	24	103
21.	(Germany) Stephanie Beckert	20	14	45				79
23.	(Canada) Clara Hughes				45		28	73

=== Team pursuit ===
Final standings after 3 races.

Pos.	Team	Skaters used	Ber	Tur	Erf	Points
1.	Netherlands	Cramer, Van Deutekom, Groenewold, Kleinsman, Voorhuis, Wüst	100	70	70	240
2.	Russia	Abramova Likhachova, Lobysheva, Vysokova	50	100	80	230
3.	Germany	Anschütz-Thoms, Mattscherodt, Opitz, Pechstein, Zillmann	70	50	100	220
4.	Canada	D'Amours, Groves, Nesbitt, Rempel, Schussler, Sibold	80	80	50	210
5.	Japan	Hozumi, Ishino, Otsu, Tabata	60	60	60	180
6.	Poland	Danaj, Ksyt, Zlotkowska	36	45	45	126
7.	Romania	Dumitru, Lazarescu, Oltean, Opincariu	40	40		80
8.	China	Gao, Ji, Zhang	45			45
