= 2008 World Sprint Speed Skating Championships =

International speed skating competition

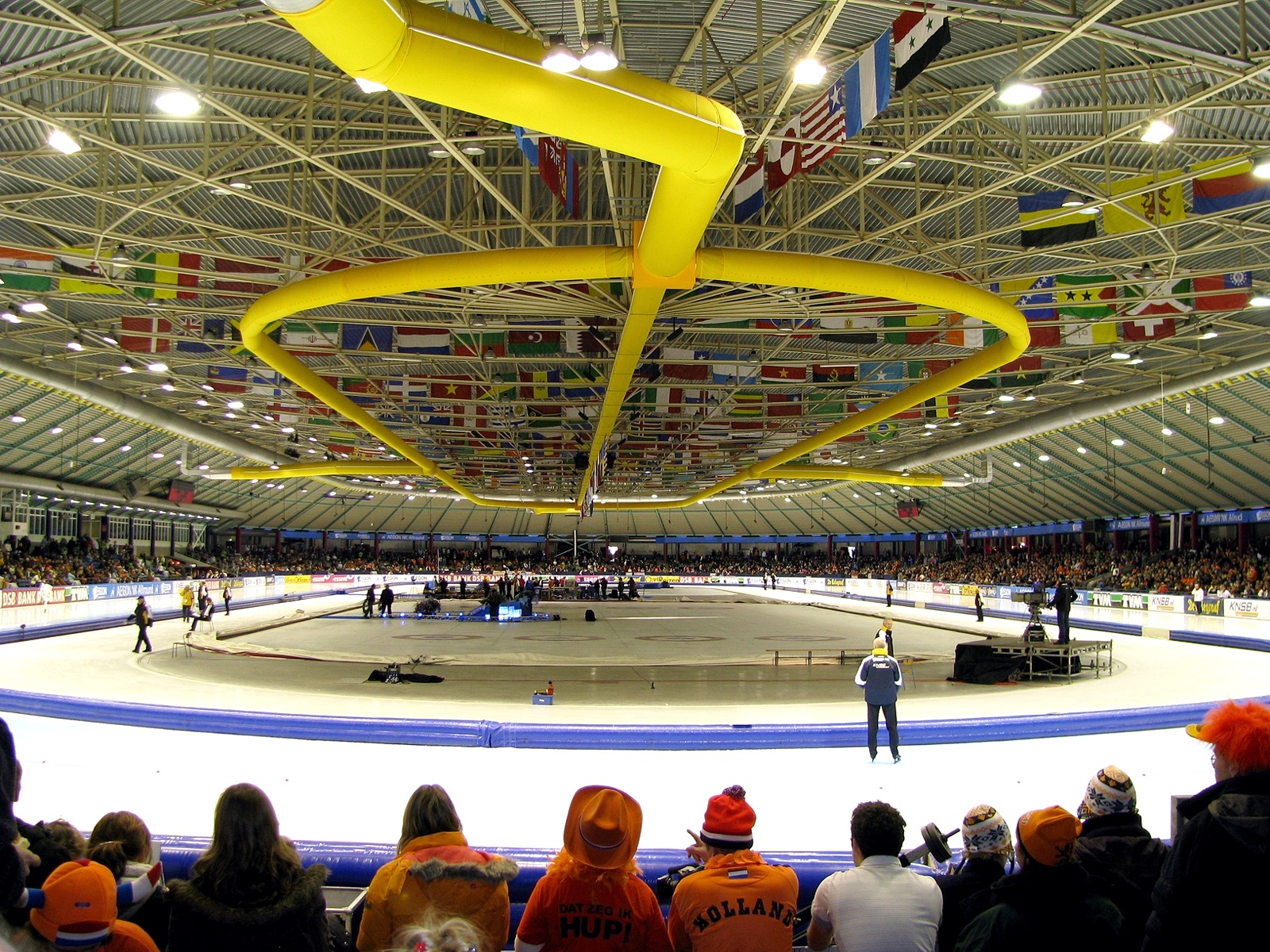
- Thialf (Heerenveen)
- Venue: Thialf
- Dates: 19–20 January 2008

Medalist men
| 1st place, gold medalist(s) | | Lee Kyou-hyuk | KOR |
| 2nd place, silver medalist(s) | | Jeremy Wotherspoon | CAN |
| 3rd place, bronze medalist(s) | | Mun Joon | KOR |

Medalist women
| 1st place, gold medalist(s) | | Jenny Wolf | GER |
| 2nd place, silver medalist(s) | | Anni Friesinger | GER |
| 3rd place, bronze medalist(s) | | Annette Gerritsen | NED |

The 2008 World Sprint Speed Skating Championships were held in the Thialf arena in Heerenveen, Netherlands, on 19 and 20 January 2008. They were the 37th World Championships.

== Men ==
| Rank | Skater | Nat. | 500 m (1) | 1000 m (1) | 500 m (2) | 1000 m (2) | Total |
|---|---|---|---|---|---|---|---|
| 1st place, gold medalist(s) | Lee Kyou-hyuk | (South Korea) | 34.99 (2) | 1:09.84 (6) | 34.85 (1) | 1:08.82 (1) | 139.170 |
| 2nd place, silver medalist(s) | Jeremy Wotherspoon | (Canada) | 34.81 (1) | 1:09.47 (3) | 34.95 (2) | 1:09.54 (7) | 139.265 |
| 3rd place, bronze medalist(s) | Mun Joon | (South Korea) | 35.62 (15) | 1:09.72 (4) | 35.00 (3) | 1:09.20 (3) | 140.080 |
| 4 | Simon Kuipers | (Netherlands) | 35.53 (14) | 1:09.46 (2) | 35.23 (4) | 1:09.28 (6) | 140.130 |
| 5 | Keiichiro Nagashima | (Japan) | 35.24 (6) | 1:10.51 (9) | 35.25 (5) | 1:10.01 (9) | 140.750 |
| 6 | Mika Poutala | (Finland) | 35.14 (4) | 1:10.65 (11) | 35.28 (6) | 1:10.07 (10) | 140.780 |
| 7 | Denny Morrison | (Canada) | 35.82 (19) | 1:09.72 (4) | 35.66 (14) | 1:09.22 (4) | 140.950 |
| 8 | Jacques de Koning | (Netherlands) | 35.36 (12) | 1:10.55 (10) | 35.40 (8) | 1:10.20 (11) | 141.135 |
| 9 | Lars Elgersma | (Netherlands) | 35.98 (21) | 1:10.84 (13) | 35.56 (12) | 1:09.22 (4) | 141.570 |
| 10 | Lee Kang-seok | (South Korea) | 35.13 (3) | 1:11.03 (16) | 35.33 (7) | 1:11.25 (20) | 141.600 |
| 11 | An Weijiang | (China) | 35.24 (6) | 1:11.01 (15) | 35.67 (16) | 1:11.02 (18) | 141.925 |
| 12 | Håvard Bøkko | (Norway) | 36.00 (22) | 1:10.11 (7) | 36.19 (26) | 1:09.93 (8) | 142.210 |
| 13 | Tadashi Obara | (Japan) | 35.74 (17) | 1:11.28 (19) | 35.62 (13) | 1:10.95 (17) | 142.475 |
| 14 | Samuel Schwarz | (Germany) | 36.07 (23) | 1:10.45 (8) | 35.98 (18) | 1:10.42 (12) | 142.485 |
| 15 | Tucker Fredricks | (United States) | 35.41 (13) | 1:11.88 (27) | 35.66 (14) | 1:11.07 (19) | 142.545 |
| 16 | Maciej Ustynowicz | (Poland) | 35.94 (20) | 1:10.98 (14) | 35.99 (19) | 1:10.55 (15) | 142.695 |
| 17 | Vincent Labrie | (Canada) | 35.64 (16) | 1:11.54 (23) | 35.68 (17) | 1:11.33 (21) | 142.755 |
| 18 | Konrad Niedźwiedzki | (Poland) | 36.34 (30) | 1:11.11 (17) | 36.10 (25) | 1:10.47 (13) | 143.230 |
| 19 | Takaharu Nakajima | (Japan) | 35.79 (18) | 1:11.60 (24) | 36.02 (22) | 1:11.46 (23) | 143.340 |
| 19 | Joji Kato | (Japan) | 35.27 (9) | 1:12.34 (31) | 35.40 (8) | 1:13.00 (34) | 143.340 |
| 21 | Aleksey Yesin | (Russia) | 36.11 (24) | 1:11.31 (20) | 36.00 (20) | 1:11.51 (24) | 143.520 |
| 22 | Dag-Erik Kleven | (Norway) | 36.25 (27) | 1:11.69 (26) | 36.01 (21) | 1:10.92 (16) | 143.565 |
| 23 | Mikael Flygind-Larsen | (Norway) | 36.41 (31) | 1:11.25 (18) | 36.38 (29) | 1:10.50 (14) | 143.665 |
| 24 | Tuomas Nieminen | (Finland) | 36.22 (26) | 1:11.67 (25) | 36.03 (23) | 1:11.55 (25) | 143.860 |
| 25 | Nico Ihle | (Germany) | 36.19 (25) | 1:12.00 (29) | 36.08 (24) | 1:12.16 (29) | 144.350 |
| 26 | Nick Pearson | (United States) | 36.27 (28) | 1:12.10 (30) | 36.55 (33) | 1:11.64 (26) | 144.690 |
| 27 | Joel Eriksson | (Sweden) | 36.84 (37) | 1:11.36 (22) | 36.64 (34) | 1:11.42 (22) | 144.870 |
| 28 | Aleksandr Lebedev | (Russia) | 36.59 (35) | 1:11.96 (28) | 36.49 (32) | 1:11.82 (27) | 144.970 |
| 29 | Pasi Koskela | (Finland) | 36.43 (32) | 1:12.37 (32) | 36.24 (27) | 1:12.31 (30) | 145.010 |
| 30 | Aleksey Proshin | (Russia) | 36.48 (33) | 1:12.52 (34) | 36.46 (31) | 1:12.03 (28) | 145.215 |
| 31 | Ermanno Ioriatti | (Italy) | 36.28 (29) | 1:12.91 (35) | 36.43 (30) | 1:12.32 (31) | 145.325 |
| 32 | Yu Fengtong | (China) | 35.20 (5) | 1:14.77 (39) | 35.51 (11) | 1:14.56 (38) | 145.375 |
| 33 | Chris Needham | (United States) | 36.50 (34) | 1:12.91 (35) | 36.34 (28) | 1:12.65 (33) | 145.620 |
| 34 | Aleksandr Zhigin | (Kazakhstan) | 36.93 (39) | 1:12.44 (33) | 36.73 (35) | 1:12.62 (32) | 146.190 |
| 35 | Daniel Friberg | (Sweden) | 36.88 (38) | 1:13.31 (37) | 37.12 (36) | 1:13.08 (36) | 147.195 |
| 36 | Pascal Briand | (France) | 37.00 (40) | 1:13.40 (38) | 37.47 (37) | 1:13.03 (35) | 147.685 |
| 37 | Vladimir Sherstyuk | (Kazakhstan) | 36.64 (36) | 1:15.07 (40) | 52.33 (39) | 1:14.17 (37) | 163.590 |
| 38 | Aleksandr Komar | (Belarus) | 37.30 (41) | 1:15.14 (41) | 51.70 (38) | 1:14.66 (39) | 163.900 |
| 39 | Jan Bos | (Netherlands) | 35.24 (6) | 1:09.13 (1) | 1:07.48 (40) | 1:08.94 (2) | 171.755 |
| DQ1 | Kip Carpenter | (United States) | DQ | 1:10.79 (12) | 35.41 (10) | | 70.805 |
| NS3 | Pekka Koskela | (Finland) | 35.29 (11) | 1:11.32 (21) | NS | | 70.950 |
| NS2 | Dmitry Lobkov | (Russia) | 35.27 (9) | NS | | | 35.270 |

DQ = disqualified
NS = Not started

Source: ISU

== Women ==
| Rank | Skater | Nat. | 500 m (1) | 1000 m (1) | 500 m (2) | 1000 m (2) | Total |
|---|---|---|---|---|---|---|---|
| 1st place, gold medalist(s) | Jenny Wolf | (Germany) | 37.64 (1) | 1:17.06 (6) | 37.60 (1) | 1:17.09 (7) | 152.315 |
| 2nd place, silver medalist(s) | Anni Friesinger | (Germany) | 38.70 (7) | 1:15.58 (1) | 38.76 (7) | 1:15.82 (2) | 153.160 |
| 3rd place, bronze medalist(s) | Annette Gerritsen | (Netherlands) | 38.36 (2) | 1:17.51 (8) | 38.44 (3) | 1:15.91 (3) | 153.510 |
| 4 | Chiara Simionato | (Italy) | 38.94 (9) | 1:16.89 (5) | 38.75 (6) | 1:16.00 (4) | 154.135 |
| 5 | Marianne Timmer | (Netherlands) | 38.91 (8) | 1:16.75 (3) | 38.64 (5) | 1:16.72 (6) | 154.285 |
| 6 | Ireen Wüst | (Netherlands) | 39.47 (19) | 1:15.64 (2) | 39.56 (19) | 1:15.59 (1) | 154.645 |
| 7 | Shannon Rempel | (Canada) | 38.95 (10) | 1:17.32 (7) | 39.02 (12) | 1:16.55 (5) | 154.905 |
| 8 | Zhang Shuang | (China) | 38.49 (4) | 1:18.03 (11) | 38.61 (4) | 1:18.66 (14) | 155.445 |
| 9 | Heike Hartmann | (Germany) | 38.96 (11) | 1:17.75 (9) | 38.89 (10) | 1:17.86 (9) | 155.655 |
| 10 | Lee Sang-hwa | (South Korea) | 38.46 (3) | 1:20.00 (22) | 38.27 (2) | 1:18.22 (10) | 155.840 |
| 11 | Svetlana Kaykan | (Russia) | 38.64 (6) | 1:18.58 (12) | 38.81 (8) | 1:18.55 (13) | 156.015 |
| 12 | Paulien van Deutekom | (Netherlands) | 39.63 (21) | 1:16.79 (4) | 39.56 (19) | 1:17.11 (8) | 156.140 |
| 13 | Elli Ochowicz | (United States) | 39.10 (17) | 1:18.67 (13) | 38.88 (9) | 1:18.47 (12) | 156.550 |
| 14 | Yuliya Nemaya | (Russia) | 38.96 (11) | 1:19.08 (16) | 39.19 (16) | 1:18.87 (17) | 157.125 |
| 15 | Svetlana Radkevich | (Belarus) | 39.20 (18) | 1:19.06 (15) | 39.13 (14) | 1:18.71 (16) | 157.215 |
| 16 | Shihomi Shinya | (Japan) | 38.96 (11) | 1:19.16 (18) | 39.09 (13) | 1:19.32 (19) | 157.290 |
| 17 | Sayuri Yoshii | (Japan) | 38.97 (14) | 1:19.00 (14) | 39.55 (17) | 1:19.28 (18) | 157.660 |
| 18 | Yekaterina Malysheva | (Russia) | 39.55 (20) | 1:19.23 (19) | 39.65 (21) | 1:18.33 (11) | 157.980 |
| 19 | Lee Bo-ra | (South Korea) | 39.05 (16) | 1:20.06 (23) | 39.17 (15) | 1:19.62 (20) | 158.060 |
| 20 | Maki Tabata | (Japan) | 40.01 (25) | 1:17.85 (10) | 40.22 (27) | 1:18.68 (15) | 158.495 |
| 21 | Kerry Simpson | (Canada) | 39.65 (22) | 1:19.57 (21) | 39.55 (17) | 1:19.64 (21) | 158.805 |
| 22 | Xing Aihua | (China) | 39.00 (15) | 1:20.15 (24) | 38.93 (11) | 1:22.01 (28) | 159.010 |
| 23 | Danielle Wotherspoon | (Canada) | 39.75 (23) | 1:20.49 (26) | 39.98 (22) | 1:20.55 (25) | 160.250 |
| 24 | Tamara Oudenaarden | (Canada) | 39.86 (24) | 1:21.15 (29) | 40.01 (23) | 1:20.52 (24) | 160.705 |
| 25 | Heather Richardson | (United States) | 40.53 (28) | 1:20.51 (27) | 40.11 (25) | 1:19.85 (22) | 160.820 |
| 26 | Bianca Anghel | (Romania) | 40.66 (29) | 1:19.44 (20) | 40.44 (28) | 1:20.07 (23) | 160.855 |
| 27 | Yekaterina Lukoanova | (Russia) | 40.18 (27) | 1:20.38 (25) | 40.21 (26) | 1:21.03 (27) | 161.095 |
| 28 | Natalya Rybakova | (Kazakhstan) | 40.75 (31) | 1:20.55 (28) | 40.86 (30) | 1:20.89 (26) | 162.330 |
| 29 | Anna Badayeva | (Belarus) | 40.73 (30) | 1:22.81 (32) | 40.72 (29) | 1:22.09 (29) | 163.900 |
| 30 | Paulina Wallin | (Sweden) | 40.09 (26) | 1:24.94 (34) | 40.04 (24) | 1:23.27 (32) | 164.235 |
| 31 | Yelena Myagkikh | (Ukraine) | 41.74 (36) | 1:22.64 (31) | 41.44 (32) | 1:22.66 (30) | 165.830 |
| 32 | Daniela Oltean | (Romania) | 41.59 (33) | 1:23.02 (33) | 41.60 (33) | 1:22.77 (31) | 166.085 |
| 33 | Susanna Potka | (Finland) | 41.73 (35) | 1:24.97 (35) | 41.90 (34) | 1:24.18 (33) | 168.205 |
| 34 | Claudia Wallin | (Sweden) | 41.61 (34) | 1:27.65 (36) | 41.02 (31) | 1:26.41 (34) | 169.660 |
| NS3 | Wang Beixing | (China) | 38.49 (4) | 1:19.10 (17) | NS | | 78.040 |
| DQ3 | Lana Gehring | (United States) | 41.22 (32) | 1:21.67 (30) | DQ | | 82.055 |

DQ = disqualified
NS = Not started

Source: ISU

== Rules ==
All participating skaters are allowed to skate all races.
