= 2007 World Sprint Speed Skating Championships =

International speed skating competition

World Sprint Speed Skating Championships
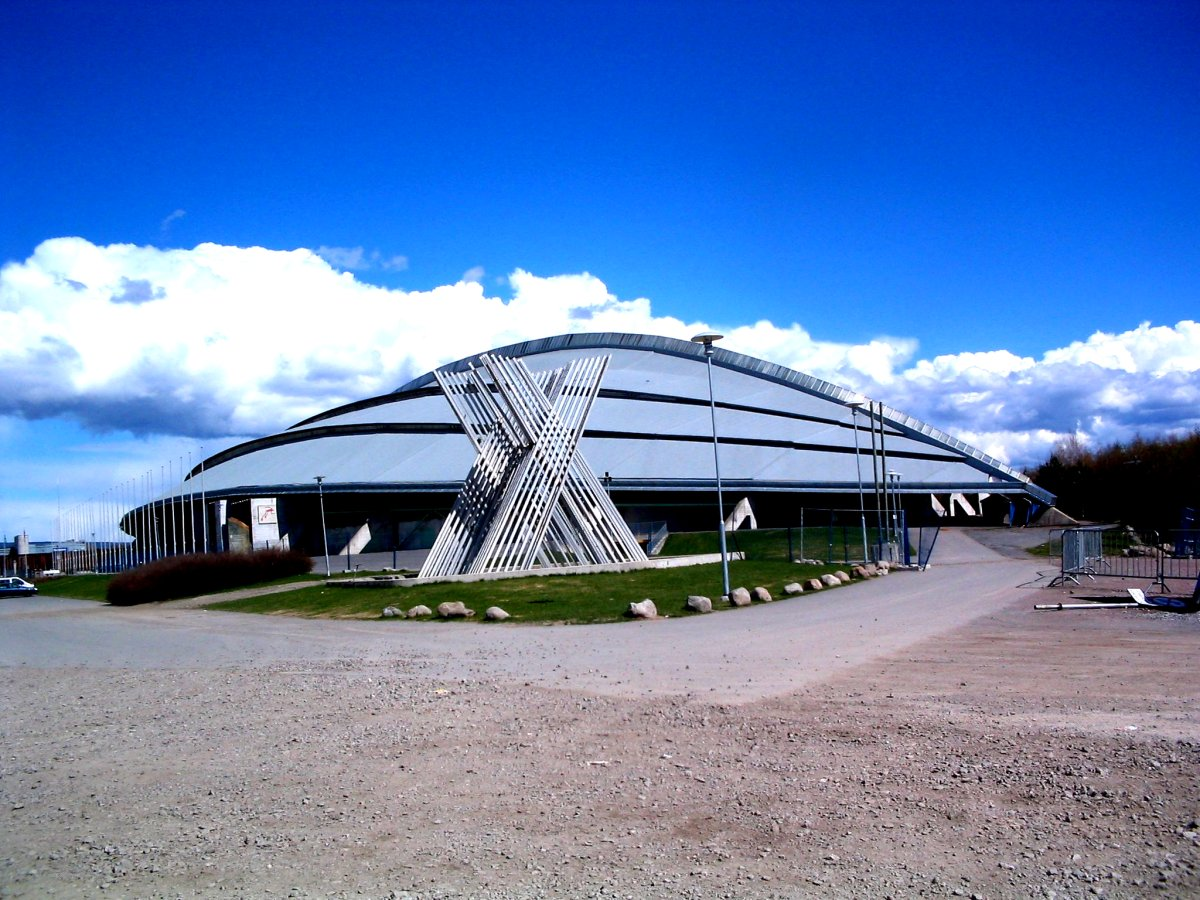
- Vikingskipet (Hamar)
- Venue: Vikingskipet
- Dates: 20–21 January 2007

Medalist men
1st place, gold medalist(s)		Lee Kyou-hyuk	KOR
2nd place, silver medalist(s)		Pekka Koskela	FIN
3rd place, bronze medalist(s)		Shani Davis	USA

Medalist women
1st place, gold medalist(s)		Anni Friesinger	GER
2nd place, silver medalist(s)		Ireen Wüst	NED
3rd place, bronze medalist(s)		Cindy Klassen	CAN

The 2007 World Sprint Speed Skating Championships were held in Vikingskipet, Hamar, on 20–21 January 2007. They were the 36th World Championships, and it was the third time the Championships were held in Hamar. Several of the world's top skaters, including the top two from the 2006 men's and women's standings, did not take part in the competition, while Lee Kang-seok (men), Lee Sang-hwa and Wang Beixing (women), all among the top three in the 500 meter World Cup rankings, did not take part as they are competing in other colliding tournaments.

Three-time world allround champion Anni Friesinger entered for the second time, after winning silver in 2004, and won gold by more than one samalog point, the greatest margin of victory since Monique Garbrecht-Enfeldt's last title in 2003. She thus became the fourth woman to become world champion in both allround and sprint.

Conversely, the men's competition was the closest since Bae Ki-tae won South Korea's first title, in 1990. The men's title went to a Korean for the third time in the tournament's history. Finland's Pekka Koskela led the tournament until two laps remained of the 1000 metres, but despite skating a better last lap than Lee he finished 0.065 points behind the Korean.

== Men championships ==
=== Results ===
Rank	Name	Nation	500 m (1)	1000 m (1)	500 m (2)	1000 m (2)	Total
1st place, gold medalist(s)	Lee Kyou-hyuk	KOR	35.11 ( 4)	1:08.56 ( 2)	35.04 ( 3)	1:08.69 ( 2)	138.775
2nd place, silver medalist(s)	Pekka Koskela	FIN	34.80 ( 1)	1:09.03 ( 7)	34.94 ( 1)	1:09.17 ( 7)	138.840
3rd place, bronze medalist(s)	Shani Davis	USA	35.62 (12)	1:08.41 ( 1)	35.42 ( 7)	1:08.38 ( 1)	139.435
4	Dmitry Lobkov	RUS	35.03 ( 3)	1:09.49 (10)	34.95 ( 2)	1:09.54 ( 9)	139.495
5	Beorn Nijenhuis	NED	35.31 ( 7)	1:08.96 ( 5)	35.36 ( 6)	1:08.89 ( 5)	139.565
6	Erben Wennemars	NED	35.20 ( 6)	1:08.67 ( 3)	35.69 (13)	1:08.79 ( 4)	139.620
7	Denny Morrison	CAN	35.86 (23)	1:08.68 ( 4)	35.81 (16)	1:08.78 ( 3)	140.400
8	Kip Carpenter	USA	35.34 ( 9)	1:09.86 (13)	35.55 (11)	1:09.60 (10)	140.620
9	Keiichiro Nagashima	JPN	34.97 ( 2)	1:10.09 (16)	35.35 ( 5)	1:10.62 (15)	140.675
10	Yevgeny Lalenkov	RUS	35.84 (20)	1:09.00 ( 6)	35.78 (15)	1:09.16 ( 6)	140.700
11	Even Wetten	NOR	35.18 ( 5)	1:09.39 ( 9)	35.66 (12)	1:10.72 (18)	140.895
12	Jan Bos	NED	35.69 (15)	1:09.32 ( 8)	35.97 (17)	1:09.24 ( 8)	140.940
13	Takaharu Nakajima	JPN	35.58 (11)	1:11.23 (26)	35.42 ( 7)	1:09.89 (12)	141.560
14	Tucker Fredricks	USA	35.33 ( 8)	1:11.32 (27)	35.22 ( 4)	1:10.71 (17)	141.565
15	Mika Poutala	FIN	35.62 (12)	1:10.34 (19)	35.53 ( 9)	1:10.74 (19)	141.690
16	Aleksey Proshin	RUS	35.73 (17)	1:10.28 (18)	36.16 (24)	1:10.17 (13)	142.115
17	Samuel Schwarz	GER	36.09 (24)	1:10.07 (15)	36.21 (25)	1:09.73 (11)	142.200
18	Choi Jae-bong	KOR	35.84 (20)	1:10.55 (20)	35.77 (14)	1:10.93 (22)	142.350
19	Dag Erik Kleven	NOR	35.76 (18)	1:10.68 (23)	36.08 (22)	1:10.60 (14)	142.480
20	Ermanno Ioriatti	ITA	35.85 (22)	1:10.60 (21)	35.99 (19)	1:10.69 (16)	142.485
21	Maciej Ustynowicz	POL	35.65 (14)	1:11.41 (29)	36.04 (21)	1:10.88 (20)	142.835
22	Chris Needham	USA	36.19 (26)	1:10.61 (22)	36.10 (23)	1:11.01 (23)	143.100
23	Jan Friesinger	GER	36.21 (27)	1:10.89 (24)	36.26 (27)	1:11.21 (24)	143.520
24	Aleksey Yesin	RUS	36.34 (26)	1:10.15 (17)	36.72 (31)	1:10.89 (21)	143.630
25	Pasi Koskela	FIN	36.18 (25)	1:11.91 (32)	35.98 (18)	1:11.46 (27)	143.845
26	Aleksandr Zhigin	KAZ	36.58 (30)	1:10.98 (25)	36.59 (29)	1:11.54 (28)	144.430
27	Artur Waś	POL	35.77 (19)	1:11.60 (31)	36.84 (32)	1:12.22 (29)	144.520
28	Vladimir Sherstyuk	KAZ	37.77 (31)	1:13.33 (34)	37.18 (33)	1:12.25 (30)	147.740
29	Marius Bǎcílǎ	ROM	38.16 (32)	1:14.83 (36)	38.42 (34)	1:15.06 (32)	151.525
30	Joel Eriksson	SWE	49.01 (34)	1:11.36 (28)	36.70 (30)	1:11.40 (26)	157.090
31	Sun Bing	CHN	53.37 (35)	1:12.56 (33)	36.37 (28)	1:12.59 (31)	162.315
32	Brock Miron	CAN	1:00.56 (36)	1:09.81 (12)	35.54 (10)	1:11.33 (25)	166.670
DQ1	Christoffer Fagerli Rukke	NOR	DQ	1:09.79 (11)	36.02 (20)		
DQ1	Risto Rosendahl	FIN	DQ	DQ	36.22 (26)		
DQ3	Gerard van Velde	NED	35.69 (15)	1:09.94 (14)	DQ		
DQ3	Zhu Jianquan	CHN	36.45 (23)	1:14.50 (35)	DQ		
NS2	Mike Ireland	CAN	1:23.24 (37)	NS			
NS3	Hiroyasu Shimizu	JPN	35.34 ( 9)	1:11.47 (30)	NS		

DQ = disqualified
NS = Not Started

== Women championships ==
=== Results ===
Rank	Name	Nation	500 m (1)	1000 m (1)	500 m (2)	1000 m (2)	Total
1st place, gold medalist(s)	Anni Friesinger	GER	38.42 ( 5)	1:15.12 ( 1)	38.39 ( 5)	1:15.13 ( 1)	151.935
2nd place, silver medalist(s)	Ireen Wüst	NED	38.96 (14)	1:15.29 ( 2)	38.79 (10)	1:15.20 ( 2)	152.995
3rd place, bronze medalist(s)	Cindy Klassen	CAN	39.08 (16)	1:15.57 ( 3)	38.76 ( 8)	1:15.49 ( 3)	153.370
4	Shihomi Shinya	JPN	38.29 ( 2)	1:17.19 (11)	38.14 ( 2)	1:17.31 (10)	153.680
5	Chiara Simionato	ITA	38.50 ( 6)	1:16.54 ( 6)	38.73 ( 7)	1:16.48 ( 5)	153.785
6	Margot Boer	NED	38.67 ( 9)	1:16.79 ( 8)	38.81 (11)	1:16.55 ( 6)	154.150
7	Annette Gerritsen	NED	38.88 (13)	1:16.99 ( 9)	38.61 ( 6)	1:16.36 ( 4)	154.165
8	Svetlana Kaykan	RUS	38.32 ( 3)	1:17.73 (16)	38.29 ( 4)	1:18.41 (20)	154.680
9	Sayuri Osuga	JPN	38.35 ( 4)	1:17.74 (17)	38.26 ( 3)	1:18.47 (21)	154.715
10	Shannon Rempel	CAN	38.85 (11)	1:16.40 ( 5)	39.11 (15)	1:17.12 ( 8)	154.720
11	Sayuri Yoshii	JPN	38.77 (10)	1:17.13 (10)	38.99 (13)	1:17.64 (12)	155.145
12	Zhang Shuang	CHN	38.52 ( 7)	1:18.42 (21)	38.76 ( 8)	1:17.74 (13)	155.360
13	Yekaterina Lobysheva	RUS	39.15 (18)	1:16.78 ( 7)	39.40 (21)	1:17.14 ( 9)	155.510
14	Elli Ochowicz	USA	39.04 (15)	1:17.47 (12)	38.97 (12)	1:17.59 (11)	155.540
15	Kristina Groves	CAN	39.39 (22)	1:16.13 ( 4)	39.80 (24)	1:16.64 ( 7)	155.575
16	Tomomi Okazaki	JPN	38.66 ( 8)	1:17.75 (18)	39.09 (14)	1:18.12 (17)	155.685
17	Pamela Zöllner	GER	39.08 (16)	1:17.51 (14)	39.15 (16)	1:18.11 (16)	156.040
18	Judith Hesse	GER	39.16 (19)	1:17.84 (19)	39.39 (20)	1:18.18 (19)	156.560
19	Kim Yoo-rim	KOR	39.56 (24)	1:17.69 (15)	39.48 (22)	1:18.07 (15)	156.920
20	Yekaterina Abramova	RUS	39.42 (23)	1:18.71 (24)	39.23 (18)	1:17.86 (14)	156.935
21	Jin Peiyu	CHN	39.24 (20)	1:18.84 (25)	39.25 (19)	1:19.40 (25)	157.610
22	Chris Witty	USA	39.64 (25)	1:18.17 (20)	39.88 (25)	1:18.14 (18)	157.675
23	Paulina Wallin	SWE	39.24 (20)	1:20.07 (28)	39.21 (17)	1:20.34 (27)	158.665
24	Sofia Albertsson	SWE	39.92 (27)	1:18.50 (22)	40.08 (26)	1:18.87 (23)	158.685
25	Svetlana Radkevich	BLR	39.74 (26)	1:19.25 (27)	39.72 (23)	1:19.47 (26)	158.820
26	Hedvig Bjelkevik	NOR	40.19 (29)	1:18.69 (23)	40.39 (28)	1:18.84 (22)	159.345
27	Maren Haugli	NOR	40.75 (30)	1:18.99 (26)	40.96 (29)	1:19.36 (24)	160.885
28	Jessica Smith	USA	40.14 (28)	1:21.13 (29)	40.33 (27)	1:22.80 (29)	162.435
29	Daniela Oltean	ROM	41.59 (31)	1:21.66 (30)	41.55 (30)	1:21.77 (28)	164.855
DQ2	Jenny Wolf	GER	37.88 ( 1)	DQ	38.07 ( 1)		
NS3	Marianne Timmer	NED	38.85 (11)	1:17.49 (13)	NS		

DQ = disqualified
NS = Not Started

== Rules ==
All participating skaters are allowed to skate the two 500 meters and two 1000 meters.
