= 2006 World Sprint Speed Skating Championships =

International speed skating competition

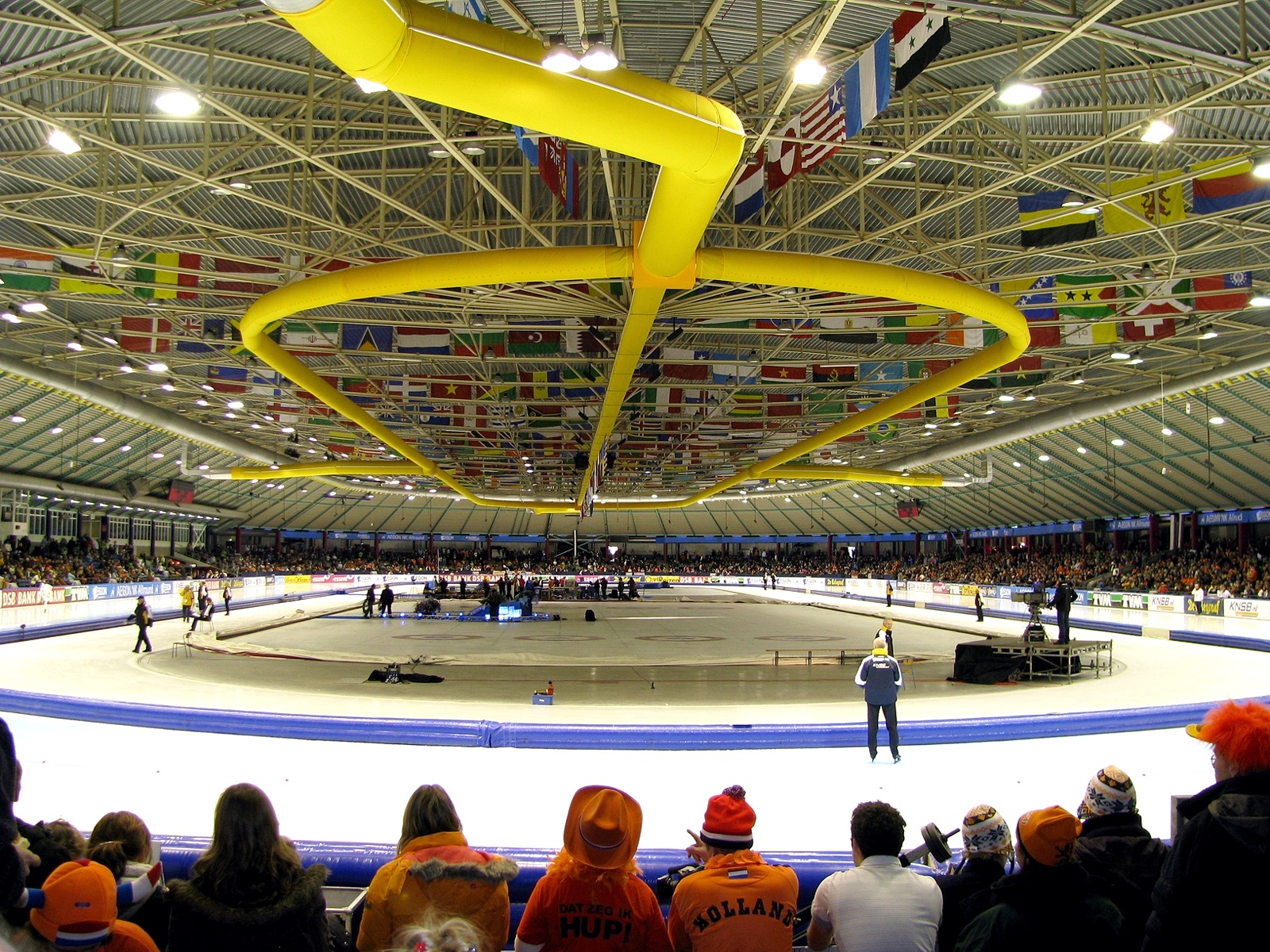
- Thialf (Heerenveen)
- Venue: Thialf (Heerenveen)
- Dates: January 21–22, 2006

Medalist men
1st place, gold medalist(s)		Joey Cheek	United States
2nd place, silver medalist(s)		Dmitry Dorofeyev	Russia
3rd place, bronze medalist(s)		Jan Bos	Netherlands

Medalist women
1st place, gold medalist(s)		Svetlana Zhurova	Russia
2nd place, silver medalist(s)		Wang Manli	China
3rd place, bronze medalist(s)		Chiara Simionato	Italy

The 2006 World Sprint Speed Skating Championships is a long track speed skating event that was held on January 21–22, 2006, in the Thialf, in Heerenveen, Netherlands.

== Rules ==
All participating skaters are allowed to skate the two 500 and 1000 meters. Skaters with equal overall points are ranked according to their results in the last distance.

== Men championships ==
=== Sprint results ===
Rank	Name	Nation	500 m (1)	1000 m (1)	500 m (2)	1000 m (2)	Total	Behind
1st place, gold medalist(s)	Joey Cheek	United States	35.19	1:09.25	35.09	1:10.17	139.990	
2nd place, silver medalist(s)	Dmitry Dorofeyev	Russia	35.11	1:09.27	35.34	1:10.56	140.365	+0.375
3rd place, bronze medalist(s)	Jan Bos	Netherlands	35.23	1:09.23	35.62	1:09.91	140.420	+0.43
4	Lee Kyou-hyuk	South Korea	35.64	1:09.27	35.79	1:10.11	141.120	+1.13
4	Casey FitzRandolph	United States	35.29	1:10.37	35.31	1:10.67	141.120	+1.13
6	Gerard van Velde	Netherlands	35.56	1:10.25	35.55	1:10.22	141.345	+1.355
7	Pekka Koskela	Finland	35.65	1:10.87	35.24	1:10.06	141.355	+1.365
8	Shani Davis	United States	36.04	1:09.78	36.00	1:09.81	141.835	+1.845
9	Beorn Nijenhuis	Netherlands	35.75	1:10.16	35.86	1:10.38	141.880	+1.89
10	Yevgeny Lalenkov	Russia	35.96	1:09.83	36.19	1:09.78	141.955	+1.965
11	Even Wetten	Norway	35.86	1:10.10	36.16	1:09.97	142.055	+2.065
12	Yusuke Imai	Japan	36.05	1:10.60	35.88	1:09.90	142.180	+2.19
13	Ermanno Ioriatti	Italy	35.63	1:11.24	35.76	1:10.85	142.435	+2.445
14	Choi Jae-Bong	South Korea	35.86	1:10.72	36.02	1:10.63	142.555	+2.565
15	Brock Miron	Canada	35.85	1:11.60	35.73	1:10.50	142.630	+2.64
16	Janne Hänninen	Finland	35.67	1:11.22	35.94	1:11.01	142.725	+2.735
17	Stefan Groothuis	Netherlands	36.26	1:10.33	36.32	1:10.06	142.775	+2.785
18	Eric Zachrisson	Sweden	35.86	1:11.49	36.06	1:10.89	143.110	+3.12
19	Mika Poutala	Finland	35.67	1:11.75	36.07	1:11.20	143.215	+3.225
20	Aleksey Proshin	Russia	36.10	1:10.82	36.29	1:10.97	143.285	+3.295
21	Lee Kang-seok	South Korea	35.28	1:13.04	35.34	1:12.76	143.520	+3.53
22	Keiichiro Nagashima	Japan	35.59	1:11.87	35.82	1:12.53	143.610	+3.62
23	Mikael Flygind-Larsen	Norway	36.59	1:10.92	36.46	1:10.69	143.855	+3.865
24	An Weijiang	China	35.58	1:12.33	35.92	1:12.50	143.915	+3.925
25	Dino Gillarduzzi	Italy	36.26	1:11.77	36.20	1:11.20	143.945	+3.955
26	Yu Fengtong	China	35.32	1:13.97	35.25	1:13.06	144.085	+4.095
26	Lu Zhuo	China	35.78	1:11.92	36.04	1:12.61	144.085	+4.095
28	Joji Kato	Japan	35.40	1:14.13	35.52	1:12.25	144.110	+4.12
29	Hiroyasu Shimizu	Japan	35.49	1:13.51	35.64	1:12.47	144.120	+4.13
30	Kip Carpenter	United States	36.11	1:12.04	36.21	1:11.98	144.330	+4.34
31	Petter Andersen	Norway	36.58	1:11.63	36.68	1:11.53	144.840	+4.85
32	Li Yu	China	36.12	1:12.72	36.08	1:13.34	145.230	+5.24
33	Jean-René Bélanger	Canada	36.35	1:11.85	37.00	1:12.20	145.375	+5.385
34	Anton Hahn	Germany	36.28	1:12.83	36.41	1:13.07	145.640	+5.65
35	Artur Waś	Poland	36.21	1:13.37	36.57	1:12.82	145.875	+5.885
36	Aleksey Khatylyov	Belarus	36.93	1:12.29	36.87	1:12.37	146.130	+6.14
37	Maurizio Carnino	Italy	36.55	1:13.11	36.76	1:12.65	146.190	+6.2
38	Aleksandr Zhigin	Kazakhstan	36.75	1:12.86	36.98	1:12.39	146.355	+6.365
39	Tuomas Nieminen	Finland	36.69	1:12.94	36.81	1:13.12	146.530	+6.54
40	Maciej Ustynowicz	Poland	36.31	1:13.79	36.73	1:13.44	146.655	+6.665
41	André Vreugdenhil	Belgium	37.67	1:13.84	37.69	1:13.76	149,180	+9.19
42	Jeremy Wotherspoon	Canada	45.73	1:09.65	35.47	1:09.67	150.860	+10.87
43	Oleg Moiseyev	Belarus	38.46	1:14.89	37.88	1:14.98	151.275	+11.285
44	Vladimir Sherstyuk	Kazakhstan	38.60	1:15.46	38.36	1:14.95	152.165	+12.175
45	Miroslav Vtípil	Czech Republic	38.35	1:16.25	38.55	1:15.57	152.810	+12.82
46	Rodan Ionescu	Romania	38.69	1:15.95	39.12	1:15.60	153.585	+13.595
47	Maksim Pedos	Ukraine	38.49	1:15.38	39.56	1:16.16	153.820	+13.83
48	Marius Băcilă	Romania	39.05	1:16.30	38.77	1:16.08	154.010	+14.02
49	Richard Goerlitz	Australia	39.05	1:21.24	38.39	1:16.37	156.245	+16.255

== Women championships ==
=== Sprint results ===
Rank	Name	Nation	500 m (1)	1000 m (1)	500 m (2)	1000 m (2)	Total	Behind
1st place, gold medalist(s)	Svetlana Zhurova	Russia	38.35	1:17.20	38.28	1:16.79	153.625	
2nd place, silver medalist(s)	Wang Manli	China	38.31	1:17.72	38.37	1:17.32	154.200	+0.575
3rd place, bronze medalist(s)	Chiara Simionato	Italy	38.84	1:16.95	38.62	1:17.03	154.450	+0.825
4	Marianne Timmer	Netherlands	38.59	1:16.96	38.79	1:17.25	154.485	+0.86
5	Ren Hui	China	38.63	1:17.81	38.67	1:17.93	155.170	+1.545
6	Annette Gerritsen	Netherlands	39.08	1:17.27	39.01	1:17.42	155.435	+1.81
7	Jennifer Rodriguez	United States	38.96	1:17.49	39.30	1:17.36	155.685	+2.06
8	Sayuri Yoshii	Japan	38.64	1:17.76	38.88	1:19.36	156.080	+2.455
9	Shannon Rempel	Canada	39.30	1:17.88	39.25	1:17.43	156.205	+2.58
10	Wang Beixing	China	38.89	1:18.41	38.75	1:18.78	156.235	+2.61
11	Tomomi Okazaki	Japan	38.70	1:18.44	39.02	1:19.05	156.465	+2.84
12	Lee Sang-hwa	South Korea	38.37	1:18.51	39.09	1:19.59	156.510	+2.885
13	Jenny Wolf	Germany	38.33	1:18.60	38.76	1:19.42	156.600	+2.975
14	Sayuri Osuga	Japan	38.64	1:19.60	38.47	1:19.55	156.685	+3.06
15	Sabine Völker	Germany	39.18	1:18.67	39.49	1:18.04	157.025	+3.4
16	Marieke Wijsman	Netherlands	39.46	1:18.94	39.30	1:18.53	157.495	+3.87
17	Judith Hesse	Germany	38.99	1:18.82	39.22	1:19.94	157.590	+3.965
18	Sanne van der Star	Netherlands	39.04	1:19.12	39.47	1:19.61	157.875	+4.25
19	Yuliya Nemaya	Russia	39.59	1:20.33	38.90	1:19.56	158.435	+4.81
20	Kerry Simpson	Canada	39.79	1:18.34	40.05	1:19.08	158.550	+4.925
21	Aki Tonoike	Japan	39.33	1:19.76	39.56	1:19.61	158.575	+4.95
21	Kim Yoo-rim	South Korea	40.06	1:18.58	39.97	1:18.51	158.575	+4.95
23	Amy Sannes	United States	39.67	1:19.76	39.64	1:18.99	158.685	+5.06
24	Chris Witty	United States	40.14	1:18.72	40.18	1:18.44	158.900	+5.275
25	Choi Seung-yong	South Korea	39.39	1:19.99	40.02	1:20.44	159.625	+6
26	Elli Ochowicz	United States	39.81	1:20.30	40.00	1:18.44	160.405	+6.78
27	Krisy Myers	Canada	40.36	1:21.27	40.30	1:21.05	161.820	+8.195
28	Svetlana Radkevich	Belarus	40.94	1:23.55	40.16	1:22.51	164.130	+10.505
29	Paulina Wallin	Sweden	40.39	1:23.82	40.61	1:23.76	164.790	+11.165
30	Daniela Oltean	Romania	42.01	1:22.02	41.49	1:21.83	165.425	+11.8
31	Yelena Myagkikh	Ukraine	42.00	1:22.62	41.56	1:22.91	166.325	+12.7
32	Orsolya Fecskés	Hungary	41.70	1:22.90	41.69	1:23.94	166.810	+13.185
33	Daniela Dumitru	Romania	42.00	1:23.12	42.19	1:22.88	167.190	+13.565
34	Anna Badayeva	Belarus	42.69	1:25.36	42.57	1:25.64	170.760	+17.135
35	Ágota Tóth	Hungary	41.59	1:25.30	42.23	1:28.61	170.775	+17.15
DNF	Anzhelika Kotyuga	Belarus	39.68	1:19.35	39.59	DNS		
DNF	Kim Weger	Canada	40.61	DNS				
DNF	Pamela Zoellner	Germany	DNS					
