= Speed skating at the 2006 Winter Olympics – Men's 500 metres =

Speed skating at the Olympics

Men's 500 metres at the XX Olympic Winter Games
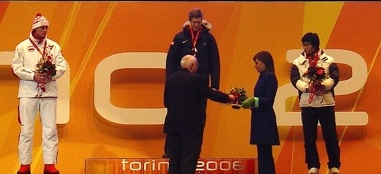
- Podium of the event
- Venue: Oval Lingotto
- Dates: 13 February 2006
- Competitors: 37 from 12 nations
- Winning time: 69.76

Medalists
| 1st place, gold medalist(s) | | Joey Cheek | United States |
| 2nd place, silver medalist(s) | | Dmitry Dorofeyev | Russia |
| 3rd place, bronze medalist(s) | | Lee Kang-seok | South Korea |

The men's 500 metres speed skating competition for the 2006 Winter Olympics was held in Turin, Italy. The competition consisted of two separate 500 metre races, with the competitors ranked by their cumulative time from the two races.

== Records ==
Prior to this competition, the existing world and Olympic records were as follows.

500 meters (1 race)

| World record | Joji Kato (JPN) | 34.30 | Salt Lake City, United States | 19 November 2005 |
| Olympic record | Casey FitzRandolph (USA) | 34.42 | Salt Lake City, United States | 11 February 2002 |

500 meters x 2 (2 races)

| World record | Hiroyasu Shimizu (JPN) | 68.96 | Salt Lake City, United States | 10 March 2001 |
| Olympic record | Casey FitzRandolph (USA) | 69.23 | Salt Lake City, United States | 11 February 2002 |

No new world or Olympic records were set during this competition.

== Results ==
| Place | Athlete | Country | Race 1 Time (place) | Race2 Time (place) | Total Time | Difference |
|---|---|---|---|---|---|---|
| 1 | Joey Cheek | United States | 34.82 (1) | 34.94 (1) | 69.76 | -- |
| 2 | Dmitry Dorofeyev | Russia | 35.24 (2) | 35.17 (3) | 70.41 | +0.65 |
| 3 | Lee Kang-seok | South Korea | 35.34 (3) | 35.09 (2) | 70.43 | +0.67 |
| 4 | Yūya Oikawa | Japan | 35.35 (4) | 35.21 (5) | 70.56 | +0.80 |
| 5 | Yu Fengtong | China | 35.39 (6) | 35.29 (6=) | 70.68 | +0.92 |
| 6 | Joji Kato | Japan | 35.59 (11=) | 35.19 (4) | 70.78 | +1.02 |
| 7 | Michael Ireland | Canada | 35.59 (11=) | 35.29 (6=) | 70.88 | +1.12 |
| 8 | Choi Jae-bong | South Korea | 35.61 (13) | 35.43 (9=) | 71.04 | +1.28 |
| 9 | Jeremy Wotherspoon | Canada | 35.37 (5) | 35.68 (17=) | 71.05 | +1.29 |
| 10 | Pekka Koskela | Finland | 35.58 (9=) | 35.51 (12) | 71.09 | +1.33 |
| 11 | Jan Bos | Netherlands | 35.68 (16) | 35.43 (9=) | 71.11 | +1.35 |
| 12 | Casey FitzRandolph | United States | 35.78 (18) | 35.34 (8) | 71.12 | +1.36 |
| 13 | Keiichiro Nagashima | Japan | 35.67 (15) | 35.47 (11) | 71.14 | +1.38 |
| 14 | Dmitry Lobkov | Russia | 35.55 (8) | 35.62 (13=) | 71.17 | +1.41 |
| 15 | Janne Hänninen | Finland | 35.58 (9=) | 35.67 (15=) | 71.25 | +1.49 |
| 16 | Erben Wennemars | Netherlands | 35.46 (7) | 35.84 (25) | 71.30 | +1.54 |
| 17 | Lee Kyou-hyuk | South Korea | 35.76 (17) | 35.62 (13=) | 71.38 | +1.62 |
| 18 | Hiroyasu Shimizu | Japan | 35.66 (14) | 35.78 (21) | 71.44 | +1.68 |
| 19 | An Weijiang | China | 35.89 (21) | 35.67 (15=) | 71.56 | +1.80 |
| 20 | Erik Zachrisson | Sweden | 35.80 (19) | 35.81 (23) | 71.61 | +1.85 |
| 21 | Ermanno Ioriatti | Italy | 35.88 (20) | 35.80 (22) | 71.68 | +1.92 |
| 22 | Mika Poutala | Finland | 35.91 (22) | 35.83 (24) | 71.74 | +1.98 |
| 23 | Simon Kuipers | Netherlands | 36.10 (27) | 35.74 (20) | 71.84 | +2.08 |
| 24 | Aleksey Proshin | Russia | 35.96 (23) | 35.94 (26) | 71.90 | +2.14 |
| 25 | Tucker Fredricks | United States | 36.02 (25) | 35.99 (28) | 72.01 | +2.25 |
| 26 | Kip Carpenter | United States | 36.40 (31) | 35.68 (17=) | 72.08 | +2.32 |
| 27 | Sergey Kornilov | Russia | 36.00 (24) | 36.24 (32) | 72.24 | +2.48 |
| 28 | Lu Zhuo | China | 36.39 (30) | 35.96 (27) | 72.35 | +2.59 |
| 29 | Vincent Labrie | Canada | 36.31 (29) | 36.12 (29=) | 72.43 | +2.67 |
| 30 | Brock Miron | Canada | 36.42 (32) | 36.12 (29=) | 72.54 | +2.78 |
| 31 | Maurizio Carnino | Italy | 36.24 (28) | 36.43 (33) | 72.67 | +2.91 |
| 32 | Artur Waś | Poland | 36.43 (33) | 36.61 (35) | 73.04 | +3.28 |
| 33 | Li Yu | China | 36.57 (34) | 36.56 (34) | 73.13 | +3.37 |
| 34 | Aleksandr Zhigin | Kazakhstan | 36.88 (35) | 36.92 (36) | 73.80 | +4.04 |
| 35 | Beorn Nijenhuis | Netherlands | 48.84 (36) | 35.71 (19) | 84.55 | +14.79 |
| 36 | Maciej Ustynowicz | Poland | 36.09 (26) | 51.92 (37) | 88.01 | +18.25 |
| 37 | Gwon Sun-cheon | South Korea | 58.66 (37) | 36.13 (31) | 94.79 | +25.03 |

== Race 1 ==
=== Pair order ===
Skater with first inner lane listed first

1. Brock Miron, CAN (alone, first inner)
2. Dmitry Lobkov, RUS – Sergey Kornilov, RUS
3. Maciej Ustynowicz, POL – Vincent Labrie, CAN
4. Choi Jae-bong, KOR – Aleksandr Zhigin, KAZ
5. Janne Hänninen, FIN – Aleksey Proshin, RUS
6. Artur Waś, POL – Erik Zachrisson, SWE
7. Mika Poutala, FIN – Maurizio Carnino, ITA
8. Zhuo Lu, CHN – Jan Bos, NED
9. Dmitry Dorofeyev, RUS – Erben Wennemars, NED
10. Li Yu, CHN – Pekka Koskela, FIN
11. Ermanno Ioriatti, ITA – An Weijiang, CHN
12. Yūya Oikawa, JPN – Simon Kuipers, NED
13. Hiroyasu Shimizu, JPN – Lee Kyou-hyuk, KOR
14. Tucker Fredricks, USA – Keiichiro Nagashima, JPN
15. Beorn Nijenhuis, NED – Kwon Sun Chun, KOR
16. Joji Kato, JPN – Michael Ireland, CAN
17. Joey Cheek, USA – Jeremy Wotherspoon, CAN
18. Casey FitzRandolph, USA – Yu Fengtong, CHN
19. Kip Carpenter, USA – Lee Kang-seok, KOR

=== Fastest 100 m ===
The ten fastest times are listed

| Place | Athlete | Time | Difference |
|---|---|---|---|
| 1 | Yūya Oikawa (JPN) | 9.59 | -- |
| 2 | Yu Fengtong (CHN) | 9.63 | +0.04 |
| 3 | Lee Kang-seok (KOR) | 9.65 | +0.06 |
| 4 | Joey Cheek (USA) | 9.66 | +0.07 |
| 5 | Hiroyasu Shimizu (JPN) | 9.67 | +0.08 |
| 6 | Janne Hänninen (FIN) | 9.69 | +0.10 |
| 7 | Dmitry Dorofeyev (RUS) | 9.72 | +0.13 |
| 8 | An Weijiang (CHN) | 9.75 | +0.16 |
| 9 | Jeremy Wotherspoon (CAN) | 9.76 | +0.17 |
| 9 | Pekka Koskela (FIN) | 9.76 | +0.17 |

== Race 2 ==
=== Pair order ===
Skater with first inner lane listed first

1. Beorn Nijenhuis, NED (alone, last outer)
2. Kwon Sun Chun, KOR – Li Yu, CHN
3. Aleksandr Zhigin, KAZ – Artur Waś, POL
4. Brock Miron, CAN – Vincent Labrie, CAN
5. Maurizio Carnino, ITA – Kip Carpenter, USA
6. Simon Kuipers, NED – Zhuo Lu, CHN
7. Sergey Kornilov, RUS – Maciej Ustynowicz, POL
8. Aleksey Proshin, RUS – Tucker Fredricks, USA
9. An Weijiang, CHN – Mika Poutala, FIN
10. Erik Zachrisson, SWE – Ermanno Ioriatti, ITA
11. Lee Kyou-hyuk, KOR – Casey FitzRandolph, USA
12. Jan Bos, NED – Hiroyasu Shimizu, JPN
13. Choi Jae-bong, KOR – Keiichiro Nagashima, JPN
14. Michael Ireland, CAN – Joji Kato, JPN
15. Pekka Koskela, FIN – Janne Hänninen, FIN
16. Erben Wennemars, NED – Dmitry Lobkov, RUS
17. Yūya Oikawa, JPN – Yu Fengtong, CHN
18. Jeremy Wotherspoon, CAN – Dmitry Dorofeyev, RUS
19. Lee Kang-seok, KOR – Joey Cheek, USA

=== Fastest 100 m ===
| Place | Athlete | Time | Difference |
|---|---|---|---|
| 1 | Yu Fengtong (CHN) | 9.56 | -- |
| 2 | Yūya Oikawa (JPN) | 9.59 | +0.03 |
| 3 | Lee Kang-seok (KOR) | 9.63 | +0.07 |
| 4 | Dmitry Dorofeyev (RUS) | 9.65 | +0.09 |
| 5 | Joji Kato (JPN) | 9.66 | +0.10 |
| 6 | Joey Cheek (USA) | 9.67 | +0.11 |
| 7 | Michael Ireland (CAN) | 9.73 | +0.17 |
| 8 | Casey FitzRandolph (USA) | 9.74 | +0.18 |
| 8 | An Weijiang (CHN) | 9.74 | +0.18 |
| 8 | Hiroyasu Shimizu (JPN) | 9.74 | +0.18 |
