= 2006 World Championships =

2006 World Championships may refer to:

- Aquatics: 2006 FINA Short Course World Championships
- Athletics: 2006 IAAF World Indoor Championships
  - Cross-country running: 2006 IAAF World Cross Country Championships
  - Road running: 2006 IAAF World Road Running Championships
  - Paralympics: 2006 IPC Athletics World Championships
- Badminton: 2006 IBF World Championships
- Bandy: Bandy World Championship 2006
- Basketball: 2006 FIBA World Championship
- Chess: FIDE World Chess Championship 2006
- Curling:
  - 2006 World Men's Curling Championship
  - 2006 World Women's Curling Championship
- Darts:
  - 2006 PDC World Darts Championship
  - 2006 BDO World Darts Championship
- Fencing: 2006 World Fencing Championships
- Figure skating: 2006 World Figure Skating Championships
- Ice hockey: 2006 Men's World Ice Hockey Championships
- Ice hockey: 2006 Women's World Ice Hockey Championships
- Speed skating:
  - Allround: 2006 World Allround Speed Skating Championships
  - Sprint: 2006 World Sprint Speed Skating Championships
- Weightlifting: 2006 World Weightlifting Championships
- Volleyball: 2006 FIVB Men's World Championship

== See also ==
- 2006 World Cup (disambiguation)
- 2006 Continental Championships (disambiguation)
- 2006 World Junior Championships (disambiguation)
