= 2006 World Junior Championships =

2006 World Junior Championships may refer to:

- Athletics: 2006 World Junior Championships in Athletics
- Figure skating: 2006 World Junior Figure Skating Championships
- Ice hockey: 2006 World Junior Ice Hockey Championships
- Motorcycle speedway:
  - 2006 Individual Speedway Junior World Championship
  - 2006 Team Speedway Junior World Championship

== See also ==
- 2006 World Cup (disambiguation)
- 2006 Continental Championships (disambiguation)
- 2006 World Championships (disambiguation)
