= 2011 KNSB Dutch Single Distance Championships – Men's 5000 m =

Dutch speed skating competition

- Venue: Thialf, Heerenveen
- Dates: 5 November 2010
- Competitors: 20 skaters

Medalist men
1st place, gold medalist(s)		Bob de Vries	NED
2nd place, silver medalist(s)		Wouter olde Heuvel	NED
3rd place, bronze medalist(s)		Jorrit Bergsma	NED

The men's 5000 meter at the 2011 KNSB Dutch Single Distance Championships took place in Heerenveen at the Thialf ice skating rink on Friday 5 November 2010. Although this tournament was held in 2010 it was part of the speed skating season 2010–2011. There were 20 participants.

== Statistics ==
=== Result ===
Position	Skater	Time
1st place, gold medalist(s)	Bob de Vries	6:22.29
2nd place, silver medalist(s)	Wouter Olde Heuvel	6:22.74
3rd place, bronze medalist(s)	Jorrit Bergsma	6:23.77
4	Robert Bovenhuis	6:24.57
5	Arjen van der Kieft	6:26.05
6	Renz Rotteveel	6:26.09
7	Koen Verweij	6:28.36
8	Jan Blokhuijsen	6:29.49
9	Ted-Jan Bloemen	6:30.17
10	Willem Hut	6:31.87 PR
11	Rob Hadders	6:33.46
12	Kurt Wubben	6:33.94
13	Mark Ooijevaar	6:34.55
14	Tim Roelofsen	6:35.97
15	Jaap Smit	6:37.15 PR
16	Jouke Hoogeveen	6:39.57
17	Joost Juffermans	6:40.74
18	Boris Kusmirak	6:41.88
19	Rob Busser	6:44.35 PR
NC	Bob de Jong	DQ

=== Draw ===
Heat	Inside lane	Outside lane
1	Joost Juffermans	Rob Busser
2	Kurt Wubben	Jaap Smit
3	Willem Hut	Rob Hadders
4	Jouke Hoogeveen	Boris Kusmirak
5	Mark Ooijevaar	Tim Roelofsen
6	Jorrit Bergsma	Robert Bovenhuis
7	Renz Rotteveel	Bob de Vries
8	Ted-Jan Bloemen	Koen Verweij
9	Jan Blokhuijsen	Arjen van der Kieft
10	Wouter Olde Heuvel	Bob de Jong
