= 2006 Continental Championships =

2006 Continental Championships may refer to:

== African Championships ==
- Athletics: 2006 African Championships in Athletics
- Football (soccer): 2006 African Cup of Nations

== Asian Championships ==
- Football (soccer): 2006 AFC Women's Asian Cup
- Football (soccer): AFC Champions League 2006
- Multisport: 2006 Asian Games

== European Championships ==
- Athletics: 2006 European Athletics Championships
- Figure Skating: 2006 European Figure Skating Championships
- Football (soccer): 2006–07 UEFA Champions League
- Football (soccer): 2006–07 UEFA Cup
- Football (soccer): 2006 UEFA European Under-17 Football Championship
- Football (soccer): 2006–07 UEFA Women's Cup
- Volleyball: Men's CEV Champions League 2006-07
- Volleyball: Women's CEV Champions League 2006-07

== Oceanian Championships ==
- Football (soccer): Oceania Club Championship 2006
- Swimming: 2006 Oceania Swimming Championships

== Pan American Championships / North American Championships ==
- Football (soccer): CONCACAF Champions' Cup 2006
- Football (soccer): 2006 CONCACAF Women's Gold Cup

== South American Championships ==
- Football (soccer): Copa Libertadores 2006
- Multisport: 2006 South American Games

== See also ==
- 2006 World Championships (disambiguation)
- 2006 World Junior Championships (disambiguation)
- 2006 World Cup (disambiguation)
- Continental championship (disambiguation)
