= Gwon Sun-cheon =

South Korean speed skater

Personal information
- Nationality: South Korean
- Born: 24 August 1983 (age 41)

Sport
- Sport: Speed skating

Gwon Sun-cheon (born 24 August 1983) is a South Korean speed skater. He competed in the men's 500 metres event at the 2006 Winter Olympics.
