= Sergey Kornilov =

Russian speed skater

Personal information
- Nationality: Russian
- Born: 9 May 1978 (age 46); Saint Petersburg, Russia

Sport
- Sport: Speed skating

Sergey Kornilov (born 9 May 1978) is a Russian speed skater. He competed in the men's 500 metres event at the 2006 Winter Olympics.
