= Shingo Doi =

Japanese speed skater (born 1983)

Personal information
- Nationality: Japanese
- Born: 23 August 1983 (age 41); Hokkaido, Japan

Sport
- Sport: Speed skating

Shingo Doi (土井 槙悟, Doi Shingo, born 23 August 1983) is a Japanese speed skater. He competed in two events at the 2010 Winter Olympics.
