= Anton Hahn =

German speed skater (born 1984)

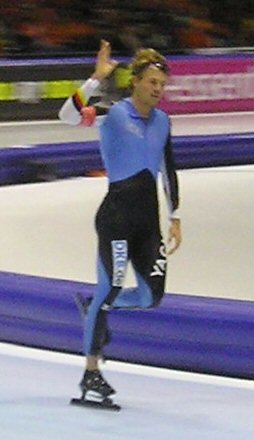
Anton Hahn (2006)

Anton Hahn (born 4 October 1984) is a German speed skater who is specialized in short distances. In the 2005-06 season he was second at the German national sprint championships, while he came in 34th at the World Championships. A year later he became German champion at the 500 metres.
