= Kurt Wubben =

Dutch marathon speed skater (born 1972)

Kurt Wubben (born 24 February 1972 in Pijnacker) is a Dutch marathon speed skater.

As of today Wubben won eight marathons on artificial speed skating tracks, including one during the 2006 Six Days of the Greenery.

Kurt Wubben won the first Dick van Gangelen Trophy in 2005. In November 2006 he finished in sixth position at the 10,000 metres of the 2007 KNSB Dutch Single Distance Championships and was invited to join the Dutch team in Moscow during the 2007 Speed Skating World Cup as Sven Kramer and Carl Verheijen did not travel to Russia. Wubben started in the B-Group, but surprised by winning the group in 13:14.31, which was a new personal record by 39 seconds and which was also faster than the time Enrico Fabris set to win the A-Group that same day. Wubben said he had respect for riders like Fabris and Bob de Jong and said he did not focus on their time, but focussed on a time of 13:30.00, the time Johann Olav Koss set as a new world record when he won the Olympic gold in Lillehammer 1994. Kurt Wubben has three daughters.
