= Roman Smirnov (speed skater) =

Belarusian long track speed skater (born 1986)

Roman Smirnov (born October 29, 1986) is a Belarusian long track speed skater who participates in international competitions.

== Personal records ==
Personal records
Men's Speed skating
Event	Result	Date	Location	Notes
500 m	37.54	2007-01-05	Calgary	
1,000 m	1:11.96	2007-01-05	Calgary	
1,500 m	1:50.16	2007-01-06	Calgary	
3,000 m	4:02.26	2006-03-10	Erfurt	
5,000 m	6:59.58	2006-11-17	Berlin	

=== Career highlights ===
European Allround Championships
2008 - Kolomna, 31st
World Junior Allround Championships
2005 - Seinäjoki, 39th
2006 - Erfurt, 26th
