= Claudia Wallin =

Swedish speed skater

Claudia Stephania Wallin (born 23 May 1987 in Gothenburg, Sweden) is a Swedish speed skater, specialised in short distances, 500 and 1000 m. She represented Sweden in international competitions until 2009–10. For the 2010–11 season, she represented Poland.

Wallin holds numerous Swedish championship titles and Swedish national records, both in sprint and allround. She is the current Swedish sprint champion for the 2008–09 and 2009–10 seasons.

Wallin also participates in weightlifting, for which she holds several Swedish champion titles and national records in the 48 kg and 52 kg weight categories.

Claudia Wallin is a younger sister of Paulina Wallin who is also a speed skater.
