= Aleksandr Zhigin =

Kazakhstani speed skater (born 1986)

Personal information
- Born: 12 September 1986 (age 40) Kostanay, Kazakh SSR, Soviet Union
- Height: 1.80 m (5 ft 11 in)
- Weight: 80 kg (176 lb)

Sport
- Country: Kazakhstan
- Sport: Speed skating

Achievements and titles
- Highest world ranking: 28 (1000m)

Alexandr Zhigin (born 12 September 1986) is a Kazakhstani speed skater.

Zhigin competed at the 2006 and 2014 Winter Olympics for Kazakhstan. In 2006, he finished 34th in the 500 metres, and 36th in the 1000 metres. In 2014, he placed 34th in the 1500 metres.

As of September 2014, Zhigin's best performance at the World Single Distance Championships is 14th, in the 2011 1500 metres. His best finish at the World Sprint Championships is 26th, in 2007.

Zhigin made his World Cup debut in March 2002. As of September 2014, Zhigin's top World Cup finish is 17th in a 1000m race at Calgary in 2012–13. His best overall finish in the World Cup is 28th, in the 1000 metres in 2012–13.
