= Sayuri Osuga =

Japanese speed skater and cyclist (born 1980)

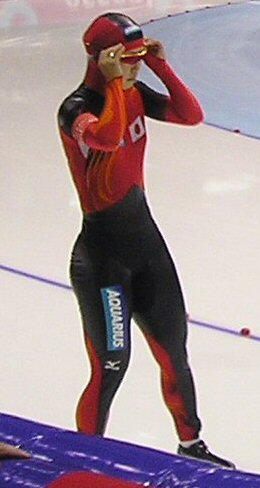

Personal information
- Full name: Sayuri Osuga
- Born: 27 October 1980 (age 46) Shibetsu, Hokkaido, Japan

Sport
- Sport: Speed skating
Medal record
Representing Japan
Women's speed skating
World Championships
Bronze medal – third place	2007 Salt Lake City	500 m
Asian Games
Bronze medal – third place	2003 Aomori	500 m
Women's cycling
Asian Games
Silver medal – second place	2002 Busan	500 m time trial
- Updated on 5 September 2008

Sayuri Osuga (Japanese: 大菅小百合, born 27 October 1980) is a Japanese speed skater and cyclist. She is one of the few athletes who started both in the Winter Games 2002 and 2006 (in the 500 m speed skating event) and in the 2004 Summer Games (in the 500 m time trial cycling event, placing 10th). Until 2006, she was a member of the professional Sankyoseiki speedskating team. She placed first and third in the Speedskating World Cup. She holds the Japanese records in the 500 m speed skating and the 500 m time trial event. From 2006 to 2011, she was sponsored by the construction company Daiwa House Industries Co. Ltd. She retired in 2011.

== Speed skating results ==
2006
4th overall 500 m, World Cup

3rd 500 m, World Cup, 2 March
2nd 500 m, World Cup, 3 March

4th overall 100 m, World Cup

2nd 100 m, World Cup, 4 March

8th 500 m, 2006 Winter Olympics
2007
3rd 2 x 500 m, 2007 World Single Distance Speed Skating Championships

== Cycling palmarès ==
2003
13th 500 m time trial, 2003 UCI Track Cycling World Championships

2004
10th 500 m time trial, 2004 Summer Olympics
