= Krisy Myers =

Canadian speed skater

Personal information
- Born: 9 August 1978 (age 46); Macklin, Saskatchewan, Canada

Sport
- Sport: Speed skating

Krisy Myers (born 9 August 1978) is a Canadian speed skater. She competed in the women's 500 metres at the 2006 Winter Olympics.
