= 2006 World Cup (disambiguation) =

The 2006 World Cup was the 18th edition of the FIFA international association football tournament.

2006 World Cup may also refer to:

== Sports ==
- 2006 IAAF World Cup, in athletics
- 2006 IBF World Championships, in badminton
- 2006 Men's Hockey World Cup, in field hockey
- 2006 Women's Hockey World Cup, in field hockey
- 2006 World Cup of Pool
- 2006 Women's Rugby World Cup, in rugby union
- 2006 ISSF World Cup Final, in Olympic shooting events
- 2006 Speedway World Cup
- 2006 Alpine Skiing World Cup
- 2006 FIFA Club World Cup, in club association football

== Video games ==
- 2006 FIFA World Cup (video game), official video game of the 2006 FIFA World Cup
