= Svetlana Kaykan =

Russian speed skater (born 1978)

Svetlana Mikhaylovna Kaykan (Russian: Светлана Михайловна Кайкан; born 6 August 1978) is a Russian speed skater who specializes in sprint. She competed at both the 2002 Winter Olympics and the 2010 Winter Olympics.
