= Chiara Simionato =

Italian speed skater

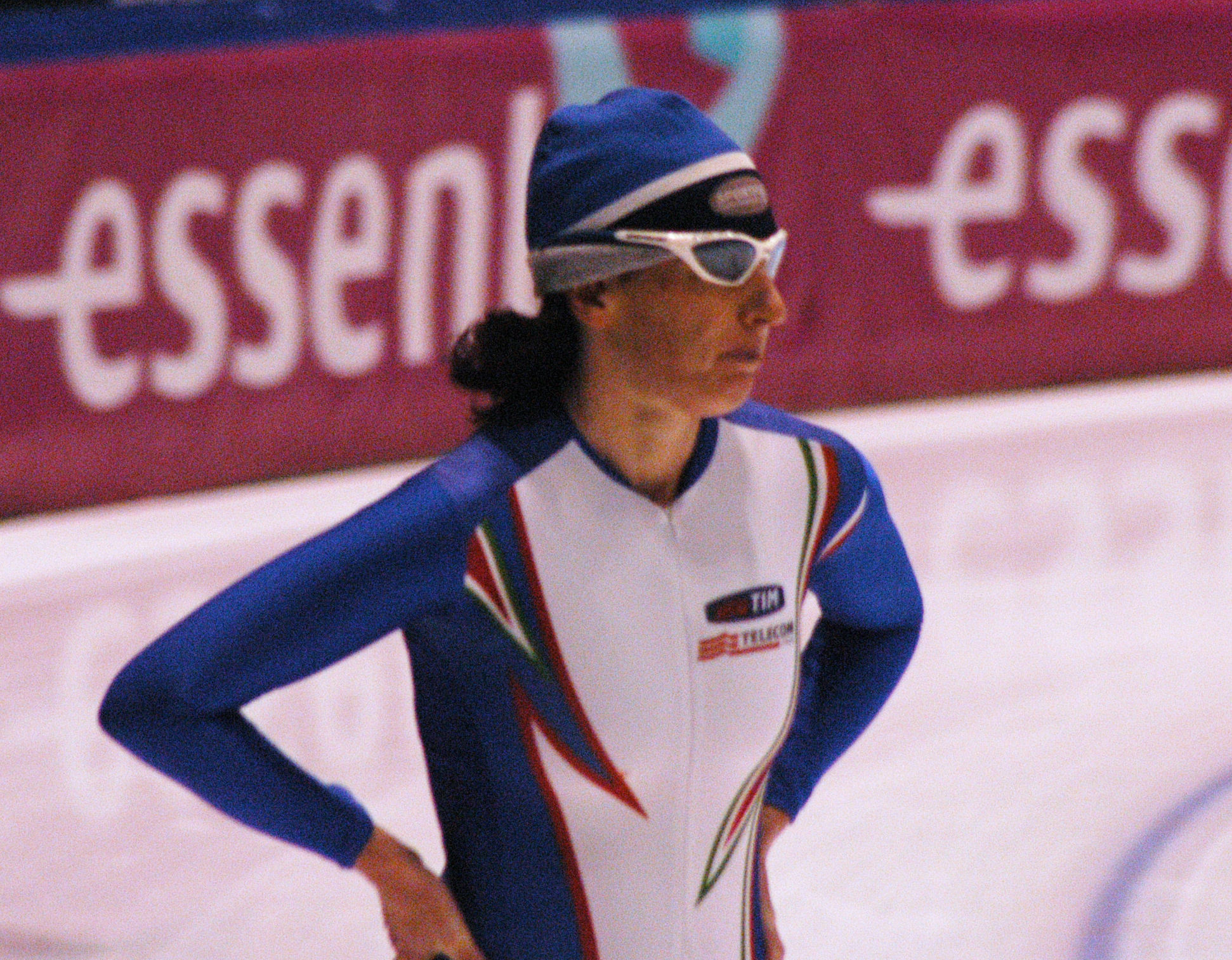

Personal information
- Born: 4 July 1975 (age 50) Treviso, Italy

Sport
- Country: Italy
- Sport: Speed skating
Medal record
Women's speed skating
Representing Italy
World Sprint Championships
Bronze medal – third place	2006 Heerenveen	Sprint

Chiara Simionato (born 4 July 1975 in Treviso) is an Italian long track speed skater who competed in 2002 Winter Olympics and the 2006 Winter Olympics. She competed for Italy at the 2010 Winter Olympics in the women's 500m, 1000m, and 1500m.

Her sister is speed skater Paola Simionato.
