= Brock Miron =

Canadian speed skater

Personal information
- Born: 9 July 1980 (age 46) Brockville, Ontario, Canada

Sport
- Sport: Speed skating

Brock Miron (born 9 July 1980) is a Canadian speed skater. He competed in the men's 500 metres event at the 2006 Winter Olympics.
