= Ermanno Ioriatti =

Italian speed skater

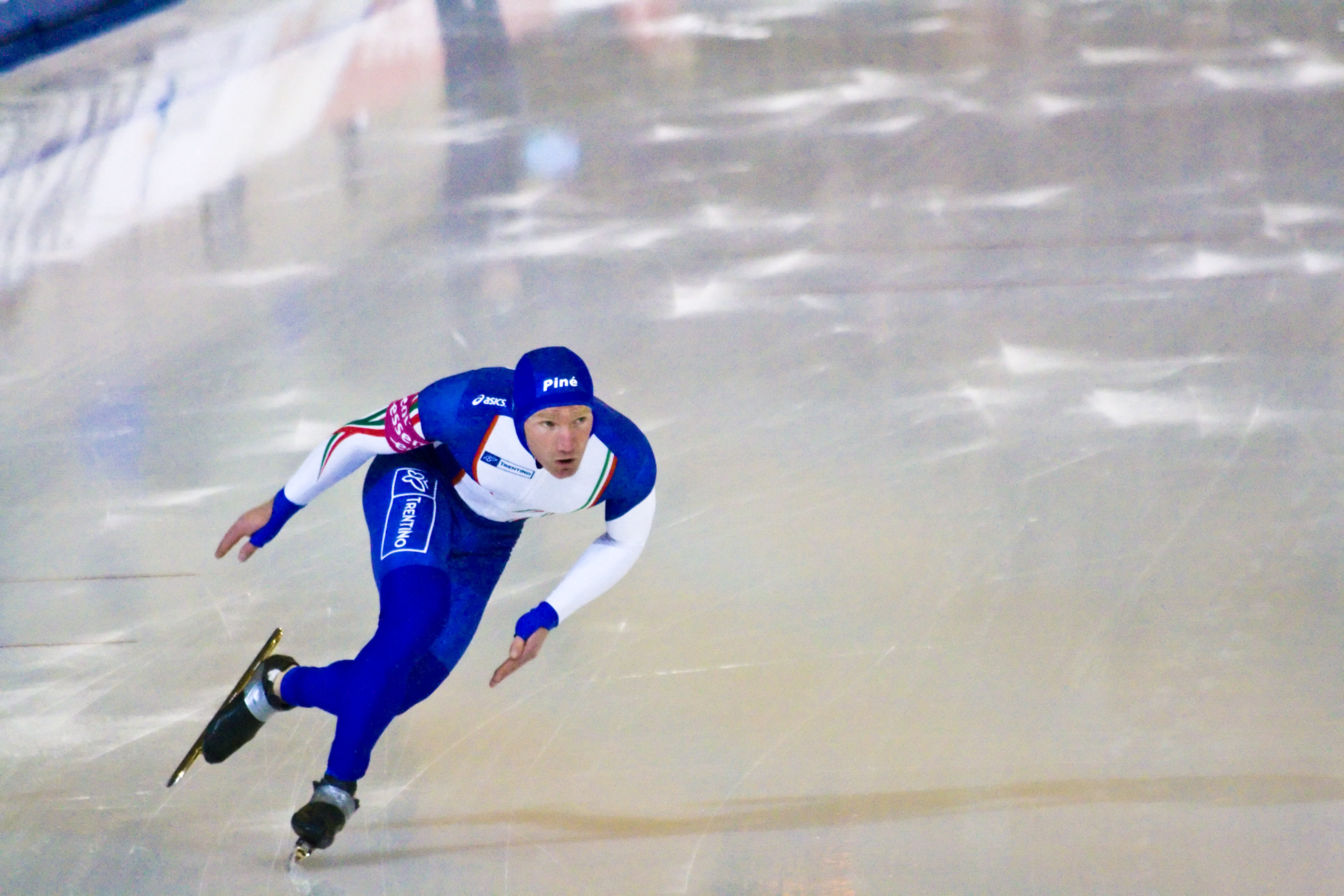
- Ermanno Ioriatti in 2009

Personal information
- Nationality: Italian
- Born: 4 October 1975 (age 50) Trento, Italy

Sport
- Sport: Speed skating
- Club: Fiamme Oro

Ermanno Ioriatti (born 4 October 1975) is an Italian former speed skater. He competed at the 1998, 2002, 2006 and the 2010 Winter Olympics.
