= Aleksey Proshin =

Russian speed skater

Personal information
- Nationality: Russian
- Born: 25 September 1974 (age 50); Krasnoyarsk, Russia

Sport
- Sport: Speed skating

Aleksey Proshin (born 25 September 1974) is a Russian speed skater. He competed in two events at the 2006 Winter Olympics.
