= Maciej Ustynowicz =

Polish speed skater

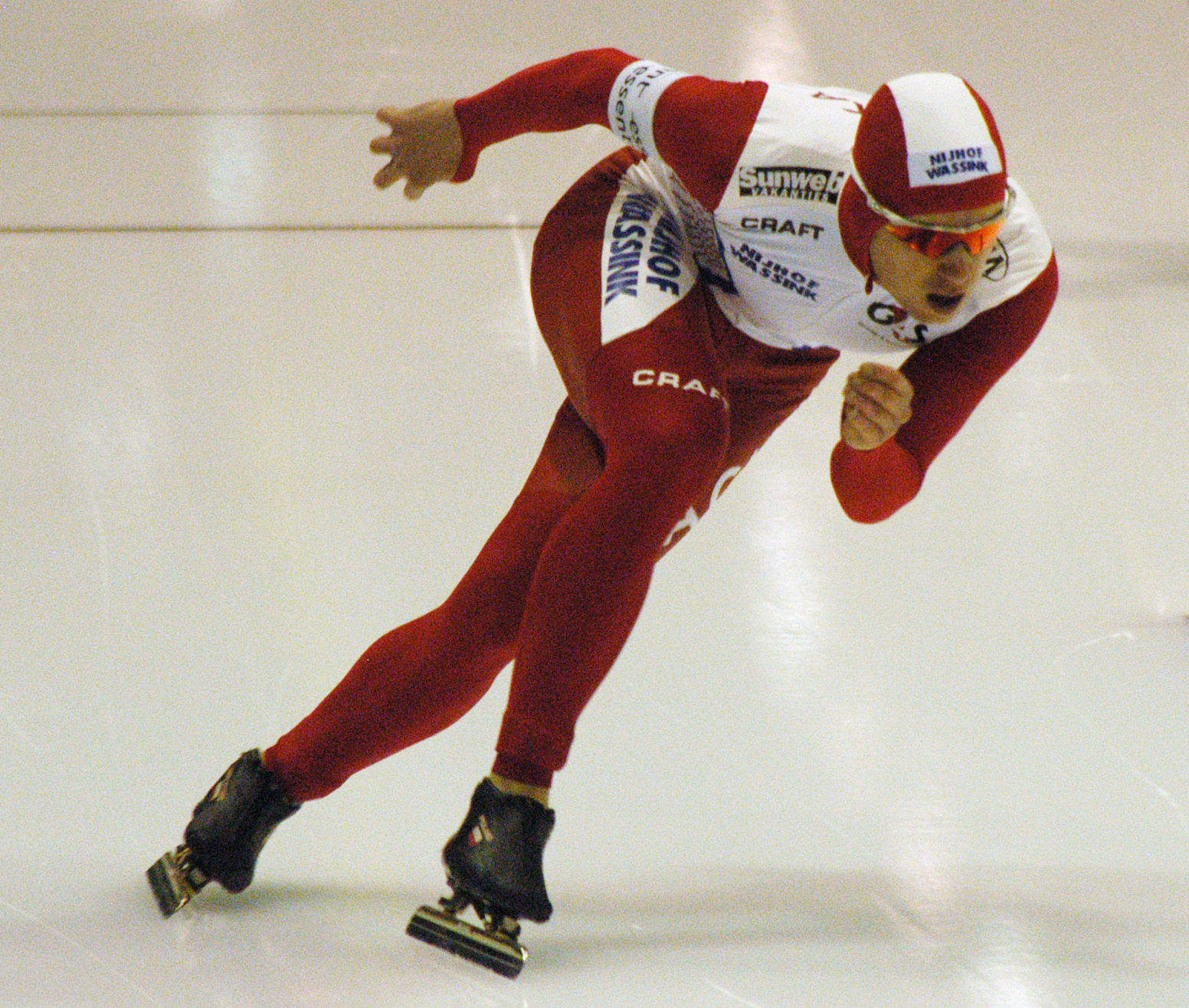
- Maciej Ustynowicz

Personal information
- Born: 23 February 1983 (age 43) Poland

Sport
- Country: Poland
- Sport: Speed skating

Maciej Ustynowicz (born 23 February 1983 in Warsaw) is a Polish speedskater. He competed for Poland at the 2006 and 2010 Winter Olympics.

== Personal records ==
Personal records
Men's speed skating
Event	Result	Date	Location	Notes
500 m	34.81	12 December 2009	Utah Olympic Oval, Salt Lake City	
1000 m	1:08.42	13 December 2009	Utah Olympic Oval, Salt Lake City	
1500 m	1:54.21	28 October 2006	Sportforum Hohenschönhausen, Berlin	
3000 m	4:24.79	1 March 2002	Ice Rink Ritten, Collalbo	
5000 m	7:46.73	17 March 2007	Warsaw	
10000 m	17:12.64	18 March 2007	Warsaw	
