= Kip Carpenter =

American speed skater

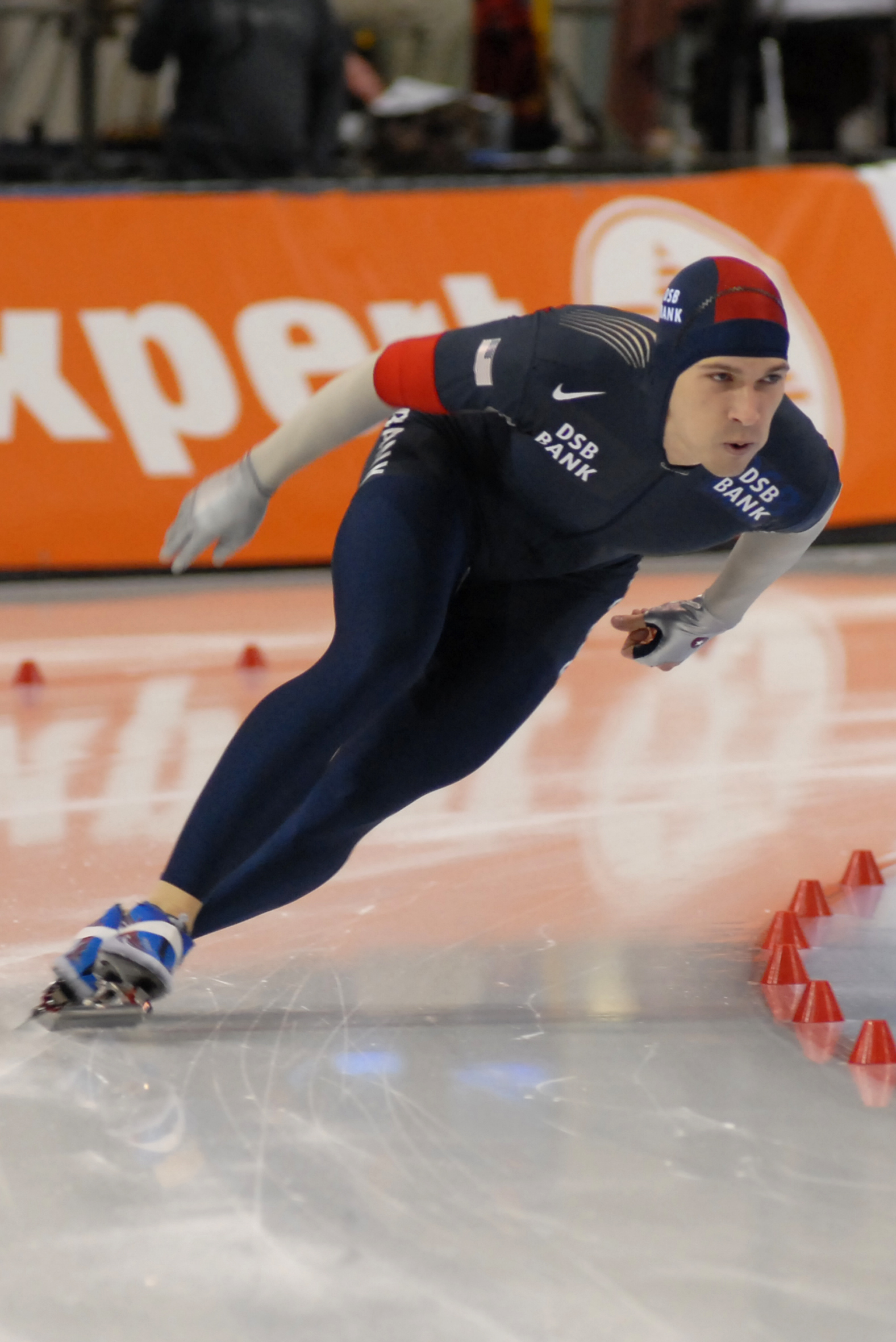
- Carpenter in 2007

Personal information
- Born: April 30, 1979 (age 47) Kalamazoo, Michigan, U.S.
- Height: 1.80 m (5 ft 11 in)
- Weight: 75 kg (165 lb; 11.8 st)
- Website: KipCarpenter.name

Sport
- Country: United States
- Sport: Speed skating
Medal record
Men's speed skating
Representing the United States
Olympic Games
Bronze medal – third place	2002 Salt Lake City	500 m
U.S. Allrounds
Gold medal – first place	2000	Overall
Silver medal – second place	2002	1000 m
Bronze medal – third place	2002	500 m
U.S. Long Track Championships
Gold medal – first place	2006	Sprint
Gold medal – first place	2004	500 m
Silver medal – second place	2002	1000 m
Silver medal – second place	2001	500 m
Bronze medal – third place	2002	500 m
Bronze medal – third place	2001	1000 m
Bronze medal – third place	2006	1500 m

"Kip Carpenter" was also a nickname of Richard Carpenter (screenwriter)

Kip Carpenter (born April 30, 1979) is an American speed skater who competed in the 2002 Winter Olympics, as well as the 2006 Winter Olympics, winning a bronze medal in the 500 meter race at the 2002 games, while also skating the fastest lap in Olympic history in the 500 meter race with a time of 24.87 for a 400 meter. He was a member of the USA National Sprint Team, as well as the DSB Corporate Sprint Team, being coached by Ryan Shimabukuro and Jeroen Otter. At the end of the 2007-2008 season Carpenter retired from professional speed skating to coach an elite speed skating team Swift Speedskating in Milwaukee, Wisconsin. Currently, he is the assistant coach for the Dutch National Team.

== Background ==
Kip was born in Kalamazoo, Michigan. He later moved to Brookfield, Wisconsin to train at the U.S Olympic Training Facility, the Pettit National Ice Center, in Milwaukee.

A former short-track speed skater, Carpenter made the transition to long track in 1998. Three years later, he placed among the top dozen in the 500m at the 2001 World Single Distance Championships. He is best known for his form on the turns from his years skating short track which gives him a distinct advantage over most skaters. After the 2002 Winter Olympics Carpenter continued to rank among the best American sprinters, finishing second in the overall U.S. Sprint Championships standings in 2004. He's also been a force on the international scene, finishing in the top 10 in the 500m, 1000m and overall standings at both the 2003 and 2004 World Sprints Championships. Carpenter also tallied two top 10 finishes in the 500m (eight and seventh) at the 2003 and 2004 World Single Distance Championships, and was sixth in the 1000m in 2004. Carpenter finished eighth in the 500m at the 2005 World Single Distance Championships and ranked 11th in the 500m and 12th in the 1000m in the 2006/2007 World Cup standings, as well as finishing 15th in the 500m and 12th in the 1000m in the 2007/2008 World Cup standings.

Carpenter is married to a Dutch former speed skater. In 2014, the couple moved to the Dutch city of Leeuwarden. Carpenter became trainer of the Dutch shorttrack team, as an assistant to Jeroen Otter, his first shorttrack coach in the US.

Personal records
Men's speed skating
Event	Result	Date	Location	Notes
500 m	34.67	March 9, 2007	Salt Lake City, Utah	
500 m x 2	69.47	February 13, 2002	Salt Lake City, Utah	(34.68, 34.79)
1000 m	1:07.89	February 16, 2002	Salt Lake City, Utah	
1500 m	1:50.20	November 27, 1998	Calgary, Alberta, Canada	
