= 2007–08 ISU Speed Skating World Cup =

International speed skating competition

ISU Speed Skating World Cup
- Dates: 11 November 2007 – 24 February 2008

The 2007–08 Speed Skating World Cup was a multi-race tournament over a season of speed skating. The season began on 9 November 2007 and lasted until 22 February 2008. The World Cup was organised by the ISU, who also run world cups and championships in short track speed skating and figure skating.

== Races ==
=== WC 1, Salt Lake City, Utah, United States, 11–13 November ===
The first World Cup meet of the season was held in the Utah Olympic Oval, which last staged an international meet in March, the 2007 World Single Distance Speed Skating Championships. The meet resulted in three world records and one equalled world record in the first four races for men, like in the meet held here during the 2005–06 season, when six races resulted in four world records.

==== Race results ====
Date	Event	Podium	Top 10 + B-group
9 Nov	Women; 500 m ISU	1. Wang Beixing (CHN) 37.32	4. Annette Gerritsen (NED); 5. Heike Hartmann (GER); 6. Xing Aihua (CHN); 7. Margot Boer (NED); 8. Svetlana Kaykan (RUS); 9. Marianne Timmer (NED), 10. Chiara Simionato (ITA); B 1. Yuliya Nemaya (RUS)
9 Nov	Women; 500 m ISU	2. Jenny Wolf (GER) 37.47	4. Annette Gerritsen (NED); 5. Heike Hartmann (GER); 6. Xing Aihua (CHN); 7. Margot Boer (NED); 8. Svetlana Kaykan (RUS); 9. Marianne Timmer (NED), 10. Chiara Simionato (ITA); B 1. Yuliya Nemaya (RUS)
9 Nov	Women; 500 m ISU	3. Sayuri Yoshii (JPN) 37.84	4. Annette Gerritsen (NED); 5. Heike Hartmann (GER); 6. Xing Aihua (CHN); 7. Margot Boer (NED); 8. Svetlana Kaykan (RUS); 9. Marianne Timmer (NED), 10. Chiara Simionato (ITA); B 1. Yuliya Nemaya (RUS)
9 Nov	Women; 500 m ISU	The gold and silver medallist at the 2007 World Single Distance Championships faced off in the 14th pair, with Wang rallying in the last outer lane to skate 26.94 on the final lap and pipping Wolf to the line after the German had opened in 10.18. Defending World Cup champion Wolf in second place was half a second ahead of any competition, though only Wang's time was in the all-time top ten. In the final pair, Sayuri Yoshii of Japan took her first World Cup podium since December, while World Single Distance bronze medallist Sayuri Osuga took 13th and last year's World Cup runner-up Lee Sang-hwa finished 17th.	
9 Nov	Men; 500 m ISU	1. Jeremy Wotherspoon (CAN) 34.03 WR	4. Dmitry Lobkov (RUS); 5. Yu Fengtong (CHN); 6. Mun Jun (KOR); 7. Pekka Koskela (FIN); 8. Keiichiro Nagashima (JPN); 9. Kip Carpenter (USA); 10. Mika Poutala (FIN); B 1. Lee Ki-ho (KOR)
9 Nov	Men; 500 m ISU	2. Lee Kang-seok (KOR) 34.20	4. Dmitry Lobkov (RUS); 5. Yu Fengtong (CHN); 6. Mun Jun (KOR); 7. Pekka Koskela (FIN); 8. Keiichiro Nagashima (JPN); 9. Kip Carpenter (USA); 10. Mika Poutala (FIN); B 1. Lee Ki-ho (KOR)
9 Nov	Men; 500 m ISU	3. Lee Kyou-hyuk (KOR) 34.31	4. Dmitry Lobkov (RUS); 5. Yu Fengtong (CHN); 6. Mun Jun (KOR); 7. Pekka Koskela (FIN); 8. Keiichiro Nagashima (JPN); 9. Kip Carpenter (USA); 10. Mika Poutala (FIN); B 1. Lee Ki-ho (KOR)
9 Nov	Men; 500 m ISU	Wotherspoon, starting in the 11th of 15 pairs, returned to the international speed skating circuit after a one-year absence by smashing the world record set by Lee Kang-seok at the World Single Distance Championships in March, taking the record for the first time since March 2001. After the previous six years had seen the record lowered by 0.07 seconds, Wotherspoon cut 0.22 off the record. Three pairs later, Lee Kyou-hyuk bettered his personal best in the 14th pair, making the fifth-fastest time ever in a pair where former world record holder Joji Kato took a tumble, before Lee Kang-seok rounded off the race by recording the second-fastest time ever in the final pair. Last season's World Cup winner and WSD bronze medallist Tucker Fredricks finished 11th, 100m World Cup winner and WSD silver medallist Yūya Oikawa 12th.	
9 Nov	Women; 1000 m ISU	1. Wang Beixing (CHN) 1:14.19	4. Christine Nesbitt (CAN); 5. Chiara Simionato (ITA); 6. Annette Gerritsen (NED); 7. Ireen Wüst (NED); 8. Heike Hartmann (GER); 9. Shannon Rempel (CAN), 10. Ren Hui (CHN); B 1. Yekaterina Lobysheva (RUS)
9 Nov	Women; 1000 m ISU	2. Anni Friesinger (GER) 1:14.29	4. Christine Nesbitt (CAN); 5. Chiara Simionato (ITA); 6. Annette Gerritsen (NED); 7. Ireen Wüst (NED); 8. Heike Hartmann (GER); 9. Shannon Rempel (CAN), 10. Ren Hui (CHN); B 1. Yekaterina Lobysheva (RUS)
9 Nov	Women; 1000 m ISU	3. Wang Fei (CHN) 1:14.31	4. Christine Nesbitt (CAN); 5. Chiara Simionato (ITA); 6. Annette Gerritsen (NED); 7. Ireen Wüst (NED); 8. Heike Hartmann (GER); 9. Shannon Rempel (CAN), 10. Ren Hui (CHN); B 1. Yekaterina Lobysheva (RUS)
9 Nov	Women; 1000 m ISU	Starting in the 7th of 15th pairs, Wang Beixing took her second World Cup after skating the first 600m in 44.81, nearly four-tenths of a second ahead of any competition. Though her final lap only came sixth, it was good enough to win her first race on the 1000m, after five race wins on the 500m. Anni Friesinger, who finished first or second on the distance in all her eight major international starts last season, took second, while Wang Fei took her first podium place after beating Canada's Christine Nesbitt, WSD bronze medallist in 2007 by 0.01 seconds on the final lap; the two had identical passing times at the 600m mark. 2007 World Cup winner Chiara Simionato took 5th, the 2007 WSD gold medallist, Ireen Wüst finished 7th, while world record holder Cindy Klassen placed 11th.	
9 Nov	Men; 1500 m ISU	1. Erben Wennemars (NED) 1:42.32 WR	4. Yevgeny Lalenkov (RUS); 5. Enrico Fabris (ITA); 6. Sven Kramer (NED); 7. Håvard Bøkko (NOR); 8. Steven Elm (CAN); 9. Simon Kuipers (NED); 10. Mark Tuitert (NED); B 1. Dmitry Babenko (KAZ)
9 Nov	Men; 1500 m ISU	2. Denny Morrison (CAN) 1:42.79	4. Yevgeny Lalenkov (RUS); 5. Enrico Fabris (ITA); 6. Sven Kramer (NED); 7. Håvard Bøkko (NOR); 8. Steven Elm (CAN); 9. Simon Kuipers (NED); 10. Mark Tuitert (NED); B 1. Dmitry Babenko (KAZ)
9 Nov	Men; 1500 m ISU	3. Shani Davis (USA) 1:42.92	4. Yevgeny Lalenkov (RUS); 5. Enrico Fabris (ITA); 6. Sven Kramer (NED); 7. Håvard Bøkko (NOR); 8. Steven Elm (CAN); 9. Simon Kuipers (NED); 10. Mark Tuitert (NED); B 1. Dmitry Babenko (KAZ)
9 Nov	Men; 1500 m ISU	The day of world records was not over. After 2006 Olympic gold medallist and 2007 World Cup runner-up Enrico Fabris of Italy had taken the lead in the 13th of 15 pairs, 2007 World Cup winner and WSD silver medallist Erben Wennemars faced world record holder and 2007 WSD gold medallist Davis in the penultimate pair. Davis had been involved in a conflict with US Speedskating and had threatened to not start at the meet, but after late negotiations he had turned up at the start. Wennemars took an early lead of four-tenths of a second, and despite a good second lap by Davis, he was never quite able to beat the Dutch skater. Wennemars was behind Davis' world record lap times from Calgary throughout the race, but a final lap of 27.56 saw him equal the world record mark, lowering his personal best by nearly half a second; Davis took to second place six-tenths behind. In the final pair, Denny Morrison skated the race's fastest third lap with 25.95, distancing pairmate Yevgeny Lalenkov by half a second, and was just one tenth behind Wennemars when the bell rang for the final lap, but was unable to keep up the pace to the end.	
10 Nov	Women; 500 m ISU	1. Jenny Wolf (GER) 37.22	4. Xing Aihua (CHN); 5. Marianne Timmer (NED); 6. Ren Hui (CHN); 7. Sayuri Osuga (JPN); 8. Heike Hartmann (GER); 9. Chiara Simionato (ITA), 10. Lee Sang-hwa (KOR); B 1. Yuliya Nemaya (RUS)
10 Nov	Women; 500 m ISU	2. Wang Beixing (CHN) 37.45	4. Xing Aihua (CHN); 5. Marianne Timmer (NED); 6. Ren Hui (CHN); 7. Sayuri Osuga (JPN); 8. Heike Hartmann (GER); 9. Chiara Simionato (ITA), 10. Lee Sang-hwa (KOR); B 1. Yuliya Nemaya (RUS)
10 Nov	Women; 500 m ISU	3. Sayuri Yoshii (JPN) 37.90	4. Xing Aihua (CHN); 5. Marianne Timmer (NED); 6. Ren Hui (CHN); 7. Sayuri Osuga (JPN); 8. Heike Hartmann (GER); 9. Chiara Simionato (ITA), 10. Lee Sang-hwa (KOR); B 1. Yuliya Nemaya (RUS)
10 Nov	Women; 500 m ISU	Wang and Wolf faced off once more, and with last outer lane, Wolf took the win and joined Wang on top of the aggregate World Cup standings. Gerritsen, who finished fourth yesterday, struggled at the start in her pair with Yoshii due to hearing a whistle for a false start, and finished 16th, though only half a second behind Yoshii.	
10 Nov	Men; 1000 m ISU	1. Pekka Koskela (FIN) 1:07.00 WR	4. Lee Kyou-hyuk (KOR); 5. Erben Wennemars (NED); 6. Simon Kuipers (NED); 7. Yevgeny Lalenkov (RUS); 8. Mun Jun (KOR); 9. Jan Bos (NED); 10. Dmitry Lobkov (RUS); B 1. Lee Ki-ho (KOR)
10 Nov	Men; 1000 m ISU	2. Shani Davis (USA) 1:07.18	4. Lee Kyou-hyuk (KOR); 5. Erben Wennemars (NED); 6. Simon Kuipers (NED); 7. Yevgeny Lalenkov (RUS); 8. Mun Jun (KOR); 9. Jan Bos (NED); 10. Dmitry Lobkov (RUS); B 1. Lee Ki-ho (KOR)
10 Nov	Men; 1000 m ISU	3. Jeremy Wotherspoon (CAN) 1:07.34	4. Lee Kyou-hyuk (KOR); 5. Erben Wennemars (NED); 6. Simon Kuipers (NED); 7. Yevgeny Lalenkov (RUS); 8. Mun Jun (KOR); 9. Jan Bos (NED); 10. Dmitry Lobkov (RUS); B 1. Lee Ki-ho (KOR)
10 Nov	Men; 1000 m ISU	Koskela, ranked seventh on the World Cup list last season, took his second 1000m race win by beating Shani Davis' two-year-old world record by 0.03 seconds. Earlier, in the seventh pair, Jeremy Wotherspoon had clocked 40.62 over 600 metres, with his second full lap faster than on his world record race yesterday; his last lap was only the 16th best of the 27 finishers. Koskela was three-tenths of a second slower over 600 metres, but had a better finish. In the 13th pair, Lee Kyou-hyuk matched Koskela's opening, but lost four-tenths of a second on the final lap, and though Wennemars in the 14th and Davis in the 15th had better finishes than Koskela, they had lost too much time early on.	
10 Nov	Women; 1500 m ISU	1. Christine Nesbitt (CAN) 1:52.75	4. Cindy Klassen (CAN); 5. Ireen Wüst (NED); 6. Renate Groenewold (NED); 7. Maki Tabata (JPN); 8. Daniela Anschütz-Thoms (GER); 9. Shannon Rempel (CAN), 10. Brittany Schussler (CAN); B 1. Ji Jia (CHN)
10 Nov	Women; 1500 m ISU	2. Kristina Groves (CAN) 1:54.25	4. Cindy Klassen (CAN); 5. Ireen Wüst (NED); 6. Renate Groenewold (NED); 7. Maki Tabata (JPN); 8. Daniela Anschütz-Thoms (GER); 9. Shannon Rempel (CAN), 10. Brittany Schussler (CAN); B 1. Ji Jia (CHN)
10 Nov	Women; 1500 m ISU	3. Chiara Simionato (ITA) 1:54.65	4. Cindy Klassen (CAN); 5. Ireen Wüst (NED); 6. Renate Groenewold (NED); 7. Maki Tabata (JPN); 8. Daniela Anschütz-Thoms (GER); 9. Shannon Rempel (CAN), 10. Brittany Schussler (CAN); B 1. Ji Jia (CHN)
10 Nov	Women; 1500 m ISU	In the absence of Anni Friesinger, winner of four World Cup races and WSD silver medallist last season, due to caution over poor health, and with last season's World Cup winner Ireen Wüst in poor form, the Canadians dominated. Nesbitt, fourth in the World Cup last year with seven individual podiums on 1000 and 1500 m races under her belt, now set a personal best with 1.7 seconds to take her first World Cup win. Nesbitt took the lead after 700 metres, and no one could match her last two laps either. Groves, who finished third in the World Cup lead last year, was upstaged by her younger compatriot, while Simionato, who finished 19th in the World Cup last season, took her first podium on the 1500 metres in the World Cup in three years.	
10 Nov	Men; 5000 m ISU	1. Enrico Fabris (ITA) 6:07.40 WR	4. Carl Verheijen (NED); 5. Arne Dankers (CAN); 6. Wouter olde Heuvel (NED); 7. Tom Prinsen (NED); 8. Tobias Schneider (GER); 9. Odd Borgersen (NOR), 10. Bob de Jong (NED); B 1. Roger Schneider (SUI)
10 Nov	Men; 5000 m ISU	2. Sven Kramer (NED) 6:07.52	4. Carl Verheijen (NED); 5. Arne Dankers (CAN); 6. Wouter olde Heuvel (NED); 7. Tom Prinsen (NED); 8. Tobias Schneider (GER); 9. Odd Borgersen (NOR), 10. Bob de Jong (NED); B 1. Roger Schneider (SUI)
10 Nov	Men; 5000 m ISU	3. Håvard Bøkko (NOR) 6:14.14	4. Carl Verheijen (NED); 5. Arne Dankers (CAN); 6. Wouter olde Heuvel (NED); 7. Tom Prinsen (NED); 8. Tobias Schneider (GER); 9. Odd Borgersen (NOR), 10. Bob de Jong (NED); B 1. Roger Schneider (SUI)
10 Nov	Men; 5000 m ISU	The fourth of four possible world records. Unlike in his last world record race, in Calgary in March, Sven Kramer did not have the knowledge of his foremost rivals' times, and had to set the pace himself. He set out with laps around 29 seconds, and was two seconds ahead of his Calgary world record at one point, but lost time with 29.5-laps towards the end. In the following pair, Enrico Fabris gave away two seconds in the opening kilometre, but skated a race around the world record time. With one lap to go, he was 0.03 seconds behind the world record and 0.47 seconds behind Kramer's time today; however, a finishing lap of 28.58 saw him take both the record and the race win. Norwegian Håvard Bøkko took his first individual podium in a World Cup race.	
11 Nov	Men; 500 m ISU	1. Jeremy Wotherspoon (CAN) 34.14	4. Pekka Koskela (FIN) and Lee Kyou-hyuk (KOR); 6. Mika Poutala (FIN); 7. Dmitry Lobkov (RUS); 8. Tucker Fredricks (USA); 9. Mun Jun (KOR); 10. Keiichiro Nagashima (JPN); B 1. Lee Ki-ho (KOR)
11 Nov	Men; 500 m ISU	2. Lee Kang-seok (KOR) 34.23	4. Pekka Koskela (FIN) and Lee Kyou-hyuk (KOR); 6. Mika Poutala (FIN); 7. Dmitry Lobkov (RUS); 8. Tucker Fredricks (USA); 9. Mun Jun (KOR); 10. Keiichiro Nagashima (JPN); B 1. Lee Ki-ho (KOR)
11 Nov	Men; 500 m ISU	3. Yu Fengtong (CHN) 34.49	4. Pekka Koskela (FIN) and Lee Kyou-hyuk (KOR); 6. Mika Poutala (FIN); 7. Dmitry Lobkov (RUS); 8. Tucker Fredricks (USA); 9. Mun Jun (KOR); 10. Keiichiro Nagashima (JPN); B 1. Lee Ki-ho (KOR)
11 Nov	Men; 500 m ISU	Wotherspoon faced Lee Kang-seok in the final pair, and though both skated below the world record mark before the weekend, it was only the second and fourth fastest race of all time after the event had been completed. Lee Kyou-hyuk and Dmitry Lobkov, third and fourth in Friday's race, lost two-tenths on yesterday's times, allowing Yu Fengtong to take China's first podium place since December last year, when he took second on the 100 m.	
11 Nov	Women; 1000 m ISU	1. Chiara Simionato (ITA) 1:13.47	4. Wang Beixing (CHN); 5. Cindy Klassen (CAN); 6. Sayuri Yoshii (JPN); 7. Annette Gerritsen (NED); 8. Ireen Wüst (NED); 9. Shannon Rempel (CAN), 10. Kristina Groves (CAN); B 1. Marianne Timmer (NED)
11 Nov	Women; 1000 m ISU	2. Anni Friesinger (GER) 1:13.71	4. Wang Beixing (CHN); 5. Cindy Klassen (CAN); 6. Sayuri Yoshii (JPN); 7. Annette Gerritsen (NED); 8. Ireen Wüst (NED); 9. Shannon Rempel (CAN), 10. Kristina Groves (CAN); B 1. Marianne Timmer (NED)
11 Nov	Women; 1000 m ISU	3. Christine Nesbitt (CAN) 1:13.92	4. Wang Beixing (CHN); 5. Cindy Klassen (CAN); 6. Sayuri Yoshii (JPN); 7. Annette Gerritsen (NED); 8. Ireen Wüst (NED); 9. Shannon Rempel (CAN), 10. Kristina Groves (CAN); B 1. Marianne Timmer (NED)
11 Nov	Women; 1000 m ISU	With Wang Fei resting ahead of the 3000 m, the podium was considerably changed from Friday's race. Wang Beixing improved her time, but so did all the others starting in the last two pairs, and Wang could only take fourth place. She remained in the overall World Cup lead as Friesinger failed to beat Simionato, as the Italian took her tenth victory on the distance, though it was the first time she'd beaten Friesinger at a major international race over 1000m.	
11 Nov	Men; 1000 m ISU	1. Jeremy Wotherspoon (CAN) 1:07.03	4. Mun Jun (KOR); 5. Jan Bos (NED); 6. Simon Kuipers (NED); 7. Yevgeny Lalenkov (RUS); 8. Denny Morrison (CAN); 9. Erben Wennemars (NED); 10. Mark Tuitert (NED); B 1. Steven Elm (CAN) and Aleksandr Lebedev (RUS)
11 Nov	Men; 1000 m ISU	2. Shani Davis (USA) 1:07.04	4. Mun Jun (KOR); 5. Jan Bos (NED); 6. Simon Kuipers (NED); 7. Yevgeny Lalenkov (RUS); 8. Denny Morrison (CAN); 9. Erben Wennemars (NED); 10. Mark Tuitert (NED); B 1. Steven Elm (CAN) and Aleksandr Lebedev (RUS)
11 Nov	Men; 1000 m ISU	3. Lee Kyou-hyuk (KOR) 1:07.07	4. Mun Jun (KOR); 5. Jan Bos (NED); 6. Simon Kuipers (NED); 7. Yevgeny Lalenkov (RUS); 8. Denny Morrison (CAN); 9. Erben Wennemars (NED); 10. Mark Tuitert (NED); B 1. Steven Elm (CAN) and Aleksandr Lebedev (RUS)
11 Nov	Men; 1000 m ISU	Though Koskela withdrew due to fears over a thigh injury, which would later keep him out of the Calgary meet, the race was still at a high class, with four races among the top six of all time. In the 12th of 15 pairs, both Mun Jun and Jan Bos skated more than two-tenths below their personal bests, with Mun taking the pair due to a better opening lap. Two pairs later Lee Kyou-hyuk opened in 16.19, four-tenths faster than Mun, and kept his lead till the end. The decision came in the final pair, when Wotherspoon and Davis faced off; Wotherspoon gained a second over the first 600 metres, and though Davis produced the fastest last lap of the race and clocked a time 0.01 behind his PB, he had to leave Salt Lake City without a win despite three podium places. Wotherspoon, the race winner, took over the World Cup lead.	
11 Nov	Women; 3000 m ISU	1. Martina Sáblíková (CZE) 3:57.98	4. Claudia Pechstein (GER); 5. Kristina Groves (CAN); 6. Daniela Anschütz-Thoms (GER); 7. Clara Hughes (CAN); 8. Wang Fei (CHN); 9. Ireen Wüst (NED), 10. Maki Tabata (JPN); B 1. Ji Jia (CHN)
11 Nov	Women; 3000 m ISU	2. Cindy Klassen (CAN) 3:59.37	4. Claudia Pechstein (GER); 5. Kristina Groves (CAN); 6. Daniela Anschütz-Thoms (GER); 7. Clara Hughes (CAN); 8. Wang Fei (CHN); 9. Ireen Wüst (NED), 10. Maki Tabata (JPN); B 1. Ji Jia (CHN)
11 Nov	Women; 3000 m ISU	3. Renate Groenewold (NED) 3:59.79	4. Claudia Pechstein (GER); 5. Kristina Groves (CAN); 6. Daniela Anschütz-Thoms (GER); 7. Clara Hughes (CAN); 8. Wang Fei (CHN); 9. Ireen Wüst (NED), 10. Maki Tabata (JPN); B 1. Ji Jia (CHN)
11 Nov	Women; 3000 m ISU	Sáblíková, World Cup winner last season, took her fourth successive long-distance win in the World Cup, and had not been beaten on the longer distances in the World Cup since November 2006, but could not set the first women's world record of the season, finishing 4.5 seconds behind the world record and one second behind her own personal best. Klassen and Groenewold came in later pairs, but were unable to beat Sáblíková's times, though they took their first podium places of the World Cup season.	

=== WC 2, Calgary, Canada, 16–18 November ===
==== Race results ====
Date	Event	Podium	Top 10 + B-group
16 Nov	Women; 500 m ISU	1. Jenny Wolf (GER) 37.02 WR	4. Annette Gerritsen (NED); 5. Xing Aihua (CHN); 6. Marianne Timmer (NED) and Chiara Simionato (ITA); 8. Svetlana Kaykan (RUS); 9. Sayuri Ousga (JPN), 10. Ren Hui (CHN); B 1. Anni Friesinger (GER)
16 Nov	Women; 500 m ISU	2. Wang Beixing (CHN) 37.21	4. Annette Gerritsen (NED); 5. Xing Aihua (CHN); 6. Marianne Timmer (NED) and Chiara Simionato (ITA); 8. Svetlana Kaykan (RUS); 9. Sayuri Ousga (JPN), 10. Ren Hui (CHN); B 1. Anni Friesinger (GER)
16 Nov	Women; 500 m ISU	3. Sayuri Yoshii (JPN) 37.88	4. Annette Gerritsen (NED); 5. Xing Aihua (CHN); 6. Marianne Timmer (NED) and Chiara Simionato (ITA); 8. Svetlana Kaykan (RUS); 9. Sayuri Ousga (JPN), 10. Ren Hui (CHN); B 1. Anni Friesinger (GER)
16 Nov	Women; 500 m ISU	The first women's world record of the season was set in Calgary, not Salt Lake City. This time, the draw had failed to give a Wolf–Wang meetup, and Wolf skated first in the ninth pair with last outer. Wang lost 0.23 seconds in the opening 100, and despite a better full lap, Wang could only take second. Avoiding start trouble, Gerritsen advanced to sixth place.	
16 Nov	Men; 500 m ISU	1. Jeremy Wotherspoon (CAN) 34.23	4. Lee Kang-seok (KOR); 5. Lee Kyou-hyuk (KOR); 6. Keiichiro Nagashima (JPN) and Lee Ki-ho (KOR); 8. An Weijiang (CHN), Mika Poutala (FIN) and Tucker Fredricks (USA); B 1. Denny Morrison (CAN)
16 Nov	Men; 500 m ISU	2. Dmitry Lobkov (RUS) 34.35	4. Lee Kang-seok (KOR); 5. Lee Kyou-hyuk (KOR); 6. Keiichiro Nagashima (JPN) and Lee Ki-ho (KOR); 8. An Weijiang (CHN), Mika Poutala (FIN) and Tucker Fredricks (USA); B 1. Denny Morrison (CAN)
16 Nov	Men; 500 m ISU	3. Mun Jun (KOR) 34.43	4. Lee Kang-seok (KOR); 5. Lee Kyou-hyuk (KOR); 6. Keiichiro Nagashima (JPN) and Lee Ki-ho (KOR); 8. An Weijiang (CHN), Mika Poutala (FIN) and Tucker Fredricks (USA); B 1. Denny Morrison (CAN)
16 Nov	Men; 500 m ISU	Lobkov equalled his personal best in the eighth pair, and in the following pair Yu Fengtong crashed out after the fourth fastest opening of the race. Mun was two-tenths slower, but a quick full lap saw him into the podium, but Wotherspoon remained unbeaten despite his slowest time of the season.	
16 Nov	Women; 3000 m ISU	1. Martina Sáblíková (CZE) 3:55.83	4. Claudia Pechstein (GER); 5. Clara Hughes (CAN); 6. Daniela Anschütz-Thoms (GER); 7. Ireen Wüst (NED); 8. Catherine Raney (USA); 9. Diane Valkenburg (NED), 10. Maki Tabata (JPN); B 1. Katarzyna Wójcicka (POL)
16 Nov	Women; 3000 m ISU	2. Renate Groenewold (NED) 3:55.98	4. Claudia Pechstein (GER); 5. Clara Hughes (CAN); 6. Daniela Anschütz-Thoms (GER); 7. Ireen Wüst (NED); 8. Catherine Raney (USA); 9. Diane Valkenburg (NED), 10. Maki Tabata (JPN); B 1. Katarzyna Wójcicka (POL)
16 Nov	Women; 3000 m ISU	3. Kristina Groves (CAN) 3:58.78	4. Claudia Pechstein (GER); 5. Clara Hughes (CAN); 6. Daniela Anschütz-Thoms (GER); 7. Ireen Wüst (NED); 8. Catherine Raney (USA); 9. Diane Valkenburg (NED), 10. Maki Tabata (JPN); B 1. Katarzyna Wójcicka (POL)
16 Nov	Women; 3000 m ISU	Sábliková extended her unbeaten record, but had to fight hard to beat Groenewold, who led from 1000 to 2600 metres. With two laps to go, Groenewold had a second's lead, and had a worst lap of 31.04; then Sáblíková rallied, and kept her lead in the last outer to win by a skate. Runner-up from last weekend, Cindy Klassen, struggled with her last laps of 33 and 35, losing six seconds to Sáblíková in the final lap to finish 11th, while a quick opening enabled Groves to beat Pechstein and take third in the overall World Cup standings behind Sáblíková and Groenewold.	
16 Nov	Men; 1500 m ISU	1. Simon Kuipers (NED) 1:42.37	4. Erben Wennemars (NED); 5. Yevgeny Lalenkov (RUS); 6. Håvard Bøkko (NOR); 7. Enrico Fabris (ITA); 8. Arne Dankers (CAN); 9. Steven Elm (CAN), 10. Steven Elm (CAN); B 1. Samuel Schwarz (GER)
16 Nov	Men; 1500 m ISU	2. Shani Davis (USA) 1:42.83	4. Erben Wennemars (NED); 5. Yevgeny Lalenkov (RUS); 6. Håvard Bøkko (NOR); 7. Enrico Fabris (ITA); 8. Arne Dankers (CAN); 9. Steven Elm (CAN), 10. Steven Elm (CAN); B 1. Samuel Schwarz (GER)
16 Nov	Men; 1500 m ISU	3. Mark Tuitert (NED) 1:42.87	4. Erben Wennemars (NED); 5. Yevgeny Lalenkov (RUS); 6. Håvard Bøkko (NOR); 7. Enrico Fabris (ITA); 8. Arne Dankers (CAN); 9. Steven Elm (CAN), 10. Steven Elm (CAN); B 1. Samuel Schwarz (GER)
16 Nov	Men; 1500 m ISU	Kuipers, Dutch champion on the distance this year and fourth at the 2006 Olympic Games, took his second World Cup victory on the distance after improving vastly on the ninth place from Salt Lake City after beating pairmate Tuitert through the last outer lane. He had the fifth fastest time after 1100 metres, but Lalenkov (in the eighth pair), Wennemars (in the ninth) and Davis (in the tenth) all lost considerable amounts to Kuipers' last lap of 27.06. Denny Morrison, second in Salt Lake, fell on home ice, while Sven Kramer had problems with his skates and finished last.	
17 Nov	Women; 500 m ISU	1. Jenny Wolf (NED) 37.15	4. Sayuri Yoshii (JPN); 5. Marianne Timmer (NED); 6. Xing Aihua (CHN); 7. Lee Sang-hwa (KOR); 8. Svetlana Kaykan (RUS); 9. Chiara Simionato (ITA), 10. Margot Boer (NED); B 1. Zhang Shuang (CHN)
17 Nov	Women; 500 m ISU	2. Wang Beixing (CHN) 37.55	4. Sayuri Yoshii (JPN); 5. Marianne Timmer (NED); 6. Xing Aihua (CHN); 7. Lee Sang-hwa (KOR); 8. Svetlana Kaykan (RUS); 9. Chiara Simionato (ITA), 10. Margot Boer (NED); B 1. Zhang Shuang (CHN)
17 Nov	Women; 500 m ISU	3. Annette Gerritsen (NED) 37.63	4. Sayuri Yoshii (JPN); 5. Marianne Timmer (NED); 6. Xing Aihua (CHN); 7. Lee Sang-hwa (KOR); 8. Svetlana Kaykan (RUS); 9. Chiara Simionato (ITA), 10. Margot Boer (NED); B 1. Zhang Shuang (CHN)
17 Nov	Women; 500 m ISU	Wang had last outer in the last pair with Wolf, but came behind in the opening and never quite recovered. Yoshii missed the podium for the first time this season, losing by 0.04 seconds to Gerritsen, who took her first podium since the win in Heerenveen in January.	
17 Nov	Men; 500 m ISU	1. Jeremy Wotherspoon (CAN) 34.24	4. Lee Kang-seok (KOR); 5. Dmitry Lobkov (RUS); 6. Mike Ireland (CAN); 7. Lee Kyou-hyuk (KOR); 8. Yu Fengtong (CHN); 9. Vincent Labrie (CAN), 10. Simon Kuipers (NED) and Tadashi Obara (JPN); B 1. Joji Kato (JPN)
17 Nov	Men; 500 m ISU	2. Tucker Fredricks (USA) 34.31	4. Lee Kang-seok (KOR); 5. Dmitry Lobkov (RUS); 6. Mike Ireland (CAN); 7. Lee Kyou-hyuk (KOR); 8. Yu Fengtong (CHN); 9. Vincent Labrie (CAN), 10. Simon Kuipers (NED) and Tadashi Obara (JPN); B 1. Joji Kato (JPN)
17 Nov	Men; 500 m ISU	3. Mika Poutala (FIN) 34.39	4. Lee Kang-seok (KOR); 5. Dmitry Lobkov (RUS); 6. Mike Ireland (CAN); 7. Lee Kyou-hyuk (KOR); 8. Yu Fengtong (CHN); 9. Vincent Labrie (CAN), 10. Simon Kuipers (NED) and Tadashi Obara (JPN); B 1. Joji Kato (JPN)
17 Nov	Men; 500 m ISU	Wotherspoon swept the North American leg of the World Cup with four out of four victories, while Fredricks and Poutala took their first World Cup podiums since last season's final to advance to sixth and fifth in the total standings respectively; Lee Kang-seok took fourth to fortify his second place overall. In the B group, former world record holder Kato skated 34.81 to return after a two-race break.	
17 Nov	Women; 1500 m ISU	1. Christine Nesbitt (CAN) 1:52.75	4. Daniela Anschütz-Thoms (GER); 5. Claudia Pechstein (GER); 6. Chiara Simionato (ITA); 7. Paulien van Deutekom (NED); 8. Shannon Rempel (CAN); 9. Ji Jia (CHN), 10. Cindy Klassen (CAN); B 1. Wang Fei (CHN)
17 Nov	Women; 1500 m ISU	2. Anni Friesinger (GER) 1:53.09	4. Daniela Anschütz-Thoms (GER); 5. Claudia Pechstein (GER); 6. Chiara Simionato (ITA); 7. Paulien van Deutekom (NED); 8. Shannon Rempel (CAN); 9. Ji Jia (CHN), 10. Cindy Klassen (CAN); B 1. Wang Fei (CHN)
17 Nov	Women; 1500 m ISU	3. Kristina Groves (CAN) 1:53.18	4. Daniela Anschütz-Thoms (GER); 5. Claudia Pechstein (GER); 6. Chiara Simionato (ITA); 7. Paulien van Deutekom (NED); 8. Shannon Rempel (CAN); 9. Ji Jia (CHN), 10. Cindy Klassen (CAN); B 1. Wang Fei (CHN)
17 Nov	Women; 1500 m ISU	Friesinger, who had skipped the first World Cup race of the season, now skated to second place from the first pair, while Nesbitt took her second victory in as many weeks, in a time identical to that in Salt Lake City. Groves was faster than Nesbitt over 700 metres, and lost less than in Salt Lake City, but due to Friesinger's presence it was not good enough for a podium	
17 Nov	Men; 5000 m ISU	1. Sven Kramer (NED) 6:03.32 WR	4. Bob de Jong (NED); 5. Håvard Bøkko (NOR); 6. Arne Dankers (CAN); 7. Wouter olde Heuvel (NED); 8. Tom Prinsen (NED); 9. Ivan Skobrev (RUS), 10. Chad Hedrick (USA); B 1. Dmitry Babenko (KAZ)
17 Nov	Men; 5000 m ISU	2. Enrico Fabris (ITA) 6:06.42	4. Bob de Jong (NED); 5. Håvard Bøkko (NOR); 6. Arne Dankers (CAN); 7. Wouter olde Heuvel (NED); 8. Tom Prinsen (NED); 9. Ivan Skobrev (RUS), 10. Chad Hedrick (USA); B 1. Dmitry Babenko (KAZ)
17 Nov	Men; 5000 m ISU	3. Carl Verheijen (NED) 6:11.15	4. Bob de Jong (NED); 5. Håvard Bøkko (NOR); 6. Arne Dankers (CAN); 7. Wouter olde Heuvel (NED); 8. Tom Prinsen (NED); 9. Ivan Skobrev (RUS), 10. Chad Hedrick (USA); B 1. Dmitry Babenko (KAZ)
17 Nov	Men; 5000 m ISU	The sixth world record of the season, and the fifth among the men. Kramer ensured Fabris' reign on the 5000 metres was only seven days long, as a race with laps below 29 until 3800 metres was enough to secure victory. Fabris skated in the last pair, knowing Kramer's time, but after a brief lead at 1000 metres he could not quite manage to keep up with the new world record, despite skating a second faster than in Salt Lake City. Verheijen, who finished second five times last season, at least advanced to third, while de Jong in fourth improved 10 seconds and six places from the Salt Lake City race.	
18 Nov	Women; 1000 m ISU	1. Anni Friesinger (GER) 1:13.49	4. Cindy Klassen (CAN); 5. Kristina Groves (CAN); 6. Annette Gerritsen (NED); 7. Sayuri Yoshii (JPN); 8. Wang Beixing (CHN); 9. Shannon Rempel (CAN), 10. Wang Fei (CHN); B 1. Jenny Wolf (GER)
18 Nov	Women; 1000 m ISU	2. Christine Nesbitt (CAN) 1:14.14	4. Cindy Klassen (CAN); 5. Kristina Groves (CAN); 6. Annette Gerritsen (NED); 7. Sayuri Yoshii (JPN); 8. Wang Beixing (CHN); 9. Shannon Rempel (CAN), 10. Wang Fei (CHN); B 1. Jenny Wolf (GER)
18 Nov	Women; 1000 m ISU	3. Chiara Simionato (ITA) 1:14.15	4. Cindy Klassen (CAN); 5. Kristina Groves (CAN); 6. Annette Gerritsen (NED); 7. Sayuri Yoshii (JPN); 8. Wang Beixing (CHN); 9. Shannon Rempel (CAN), 10. Wang Fei (CHN); B 1. Jenny Wolf (GER)
18 Nov	Women; 1000 m ISU	Friesinger skated in the last pair, and set a World Cup season best with more than six-tenths of a second to take over the World Cup lead and her first win of the season, while Wang Beixing, the victor in the first Salt Lake City race, was beaten comprehensively on both full laps. Simionato was beaten to the line by pairmate Nesbitt, who took her fourth career runner-up spot on the distance, where she is still due to win.	
18 Nov	Men; 1000 m ISU	1. Denny Morrison (CAN) 1:07.25	5. Simon Kuipers (NED); 6. Jan Bos (NED); 7. Mark Tuitert (NED); 8. Keiichiro Nagashima (JPN); 9. Lee Kang-seok (KOR), 10. Dmitry Lobkov (RUS); B 1. Håvard Bøkko (NOR)
18 Nov	Men; 1000 m ISU	2. Jeremy Wotherspoon (CAN) 1:07.31	5. Simon Kuipers (NED); 6. Jan Bos (NED); 7. Mark Tuitert (NED); 8. Keiichiro Nagashima (JPN); 9. Lee Kang-seok (KOR), 10. Dmitry Lobkov (RUS); B 1. Håvard Bøkko (NOR)
18 Nov	Men; 1000 m ISU	3. Shani Davis (USA) 1:07.40; Lee Kyou-hyuk (KOR) 1:07.40	5. Simon Kuipers (NED); 6. Jan Bos (NED); 7. Mark Tuitert (NED); 8. Keiichiro Nagashima (JPN); 9. Lee Kang-seok (KOR), 10. Dmitry Lobkov (RUS); B 1. Håvard Bøkko (NOR)
18 Nov	Men; 1000 m ISU	Denny Morrison recovered from his poor race in Salt Lake City with his second career victory on the distance, in a race marred by timing controversies. Simon Kuipers faced Shani Davis in the ninth pair, and TV pictures indicated that Kuipers had beaten Davis, despite the electronic clocks showing Davis 0.02 seconds ahead. Kuipers was initially awarded the third place, but after long referee deliberations, he was put back to fifth as the electronic timing system were trusted. According to Dutch skating referee Jacques de Koning, the rule used by the referees in Calgary to reinstate the timing results was incorrect.	
18 Nov	Women; Team pursuit ISU	1. Germany (Anschütz-Thoms, Friesinger, Pechstein) 2:56.46	4. Japan; 5. China; 6. Poland; 7. United States; 8. Netherlands; 9. Romania, 10. Belarus
18 Nov	Women; Team pursuit ISU	2. Canada (Groves, Nesbitt, Rempel) 2:59.18	4. Japan; 5. China; 6. Poland; 7. United States; 8. Netherlands; 9. Romania, 10. Belarus
18 Nov	Women; Team pursuit ISU	3. Russia (Abramova, Likhachova, Lobysheva) 3:01.04	4. Japan; 5. China; 6. Poland; 7. United States; 8. Netherlands; 9. Romania, 10. Belarus
18 Nov	Women; Team pursuit ISU	The German Olympic champions took revenge on the Canadian team that won gold at the 2007 single distance championship by setting the second fastest time of all time. The Dutch team without skaters from the TVM team, such as Wüst, Groenewold and van Deutekom, included sprinters Margot Boer and Laurine van Riessen, and finished with a last lap of 37.88 seconds, beaten by eight seconds in that lap by pairmates Canada.	
18 Nov	Men; Team pursuit ISU	1. Canada (Dankers, Elm, Morrison) 3:41.95	4. Russia; 5. Poland; 6. Netherlands; 7. Sweden; 8. Japan; 9. United States, 10. Italy
18 Nov	Men; Team pursuit ISU	2. Norway (Bøkko, Christiansen, Haugli) 3:42.88	4. Russia; 5. Poland; 6. Netherlands; 7. Sweden; 8. Japan; 9. United States, 10. Italy
18 Nov	Men; Team pursuit ISU	3. Germany (Heythausen, Lehmann, Schneider) 3:44.40	4. Russia; 5. Poland; 6. Netherlands; 7. Sweden; 8. Japan; 9. United States, 10. Italy
18 Nov	Men; Team pursuit ISU	With World Cup gold medallists Kramer, Verheijen and Wennemars all out of the team, the defending winners and WSD gold medallists Netherlands finished far down the rankings, and Canada took the win in a time four seconds behind the world record. Norway repeated their best performance from last season, while Germany took their first podium place in an official World Cup race.	

=== WC 3, Kolomna, Russia, 1–2 December ===
The meet was originally scheduled to be held in Moscow, in the Krylatskoye Ice Rink, but Krylatskoye has been closed due to safety issues and the event moved to the Kolomna Speed Skating Center in Kolomna.

==== Race results ====
Date	Event	Podium	Top 10 + B-group
1 Dec	Men; 1500 m ISU	1. Erben Wennemars (NED) 1:46.07	4. Ivan Skobrev (RUS); 5. Mark Tuitert (NED); 6. Chad Hedrick (USA); 7. Dmitry Babenko (KAZ); 8. Yevgeny Lalenkov (RUS); 9. Simon Kuipers (NED), 10. Konrad Niedźwiedzki (POL); B 1. Tom Prinsen (NED)
1 Dec	Men; 1500 m ISU	2. Enrico Fabris (ITA) 1:46.08	4. Ivan Skobrev (RUS); 5. Mark Tuitert (NED); 6. Chad Hedrick (USA); 7. Dmitry Babenko (KAZ); 8. Yevgeny Lalenkov (RUS); 9. Simon Kuipers (NED), 10. Konrad Niedźwiedzki (POL); B 1. Tom Prinsen (NED)
1 Dec	Men; 1500 m ISU	3. Håvard Bøkko (NOR) 1:46.12	4. Ivan Skobrev (RUS); 5. Mark Tuitert (NED); 6. Chad Hedrick (USA); 7. Dmitry Babenko (KAZ); 8. Yevgeny Lalenkov (RUS); 9. Simon Kuipers (NED), 10. Konrad Niedźwiedzki (POL); B 1. Tom Prinsen (NED)
1 Dec	Men; 1500 m ISU	Two podium finishers in North America, Denny Morrison and Shani Davis, as well as world allround champion Kramer did not start here, but World Cup leader Wennemars hung on despite a weak last lap of 29.08, where he lost more than a second to Fabris and Bøkko. Bøkko, who was ranked eighth, took his first podium on the distance, where his best performance before the season had been 9th, and Fabris advanced from sixth to second in the overall standings.	
1 Dec	Women; 5000 m ISU	1. Martina Sáblíková (CZE) 6:53.67	4. Claudia Pechstein (GER); 5. Kristina Groves (CAN); 6. Cindy Klassen (CAN); 7. Catherine Raney (USA); 8. Diane Valkenburg (NED); 9. Maki Tabata (JPN), 10. Katarzyna Wójcicka (POL); B 1. Gretha Smit (NED)
1 Dec	Women; 5000 m ISU	2. Clara Hughes (CAN) 6:56.63	4. Claudia Pechstein (GER); 5. Kristina Groves (CAN); 6. Cindy Klassen (CAN); 7. Catherine Raney (USA); 8. Diane Valkenburg (NED); 9. Maki Tabata (JPN), 10. Katarzyna Wójcicka (POL); B 1. Gretha Smit (NED)
1 Dec	Women; 5000 m ISU	3. Daniela Anschütz-Thoms (GER) 6:58.58	4. Claudia Pechstein (GER); 5. Kristina Groves (CAN); 6. Cindy Klassen (CAN); 7. Catherine Raney (USA); 8. Diane Valkenburg (NED); 9. Maki Tabata (JPN), 10. Katarzyna Wójcicka (POL); B 1. Gretha Smit (NED)
1 Dec	Women; 5000 m ISU	Sáblíková remains unbeaten on the longest distance, while Hughes entered the podium for the first time in a top international race since the 2006 Olympic Games. In the B group, Gretha Smit repeated her performance from last season's World Cup meet in Russia, by winning the B group in a faster time than the A group.	
2 Dec	Women; 1500 m ISU	1. Anni Friesinger (GER) 1:55.39	4. Kristina Groves (CAN); 5. Diane Valkenburg (NED); 6. Yekaterina Lobysheva (RUS); 7. Katarzyna Wójcicka (POL); 8. Marrit Leenstra (NED); 9. Martina Sáblíková (CZE), 10. Claudia Pechstein (GER); B 1. Jorien Voorhuis (NED)
2 Dec	Women; 1500 m ISU	2. Christine Nesbitt (CAN) 1:56.00	4. Kristina Groves (CAN); 5. Diane Valkenburg (NED); 6. Yekaterina Lobysheva (RUS); 7. Katarzyna Wójcicka (POL); 8. Marrit Leenstra (NED); 9. Martina Sáblíková (CZE), 10. Claudia Pechstein (GER); B 1. Jorien Voorhuis (NED)
2 Dec	Women; 1500 m ISU	3. Daniela Anschütz-Thoms (GER) 1:57.10	4. Kristina Groves (CAN); 5. Diane Valkenburg (NED); 6. Yekaterina Lobysheva (RUS); 7. Katarzyna Wójcicka (POL); 8. Marrit Leenstra (NED); 9. Martina Sáblíková (CZE), 10. Claudia Pechstein (GER); B 1. Jorien Voorhuis (NED)
2 Dec	Women; 1500 m ISU	Nesbitt was defeated for the first time this season, losing 0.8 seconds on the first lap, which she never recovered. Friesinger thus advanced from sixth to third in the World Cup standings. The podium was identical to the race in Moscow last year, with Anschütz-Thoms taking her first podium on this distance since then. Cindy Klassen was disqualified from what would have been a fifth place after impeding Friesinger in the changeover.	
2 Dec	Men; 10 000 m ISU	1. Håvard Bøkko (NOR) 13:06.53	4. Marco Weber (GER); 5. Chad Hedrick (USA); 6. Brigt Rykkje (NED); 7. Ivan Skobrev (RUS); 8. Dmitry Babenko (KAZ); 9. Hiroki Hirako (JPN), 10. Tobias Schneider (GER); B 1. Tristan Loy (FRA)
2 Dec	Men; 10 000 m ISU	2. Tom Prinsen (NED) 13:16.11	4. Marco Weber (GER); 5. Chad Hedrick (USA); 6. Brigt Rykkje (NED); 7. Ivan Skobrev (RUS); 8. Dmitry Babenko (KAZ); 9. Hiroki Hirako (JPN), 10. Tobias Schneider (GER); B 1. Tristan Loy (FRA)
2 Dec	Men; 10 000 m ISU	3. Bob de Jong (NED) 13:17.77	4. Marco Weber (GER); 5. Chad Hedrick (USA); 6. Brigt Rykkje (NED); 7. Ivan Skobrev (RUS); 8. Dmitry Babenko (KAZ); 9. Hiroki Hirako (JPN), 10. Tobias Schneider (GER); B 1. Tristan Loy (FRA)
2 Dec	Men; 10 000 m ISU	Bøkko's first World Cup victory, helped by the absence of Kramer and a fall from Carl Verheijen, led him to the top of the World Cup standings. Bøkko skated the last five kilometres in 6:28, ten seconds faster than the first five. Prinsen took his best place in an official World Cup race, beating the time of Olympic gold medallist de Jong, while in the B group Loy skated 13:14 for a new French record and the second fastest time of the day.	

=== WC 4, Heerenveen, Netherlands, 7–9 December ===
==== Race results ====
Date	Event	Podium	Top 10 + B-group
7 Dec	Women; 500 m ISU	1. Wang Beixing (CHN) 37.96	4. Judith Hesse (GER); 5. Anni Friesinger (GER); 6. Margot Boer (NED); 7. Lee Sang-hwa (KOR); 8. Yuliya Nemaya (RUS); 9. Lee Bo-ra (KOR) and Svetlana Kaykan (RUS); B 1. Christine Nesbitt (CAN)
7 Dec	Women; 500 m ISU	2. Jenny Wolf (GER) 38.03	4. Judith Hesse (GER); 5. Anni Friesinger (GER); 6. Margot Boer (NED); 7. Lee Sang-hwa (KOR); 8. Yuliya Nemaya (RUS); 9. Lee Bo-ra (KOR) and Svetlana Kaykan (RUS); B 1. Christine Nesbitt (CAN)
7 Dec	Women; 500 m ISU	3. Annette Gerritsen (NED) 38.53	4. Judith Hesse (GER); 5. Anni Friesinger (GER); 6. Margot Boer (NED); 7. Lee Sang-hwa (KOR); 8. Yuliya Nemaya (RUS); 9. Lee Bo-ra (KOR) and Svetlana Kaykan (RUS); B 1. Christine Nesbitt (CAN)
7 Dec	Women; 500 m ISU	Wang's second victory, with Wolf and Wang yet again dominant; Wang was 0.04 seconds behind after 100 metres, but did a better full lap to win. Gerritsen took her second victory, while World Cup No. 3 Yoshii had lost form since North America and finished 13th.	
7 Dec	Men; 500 m ISU	1. Tucker Fredricks (USA) 34.89	4. Keiichiro Nagashima (JPN); 5. Lee Kang-seok (KOR); 6. Joji Kato (JPN); 7. An Weijiang (CHN); 8. Dmitry Lobkov (RUS); 9. Yu Fengtong (CHN), 10. Mika Poutala (FIN); B 1. Simon Kuipers (NED)
7 Dec	Men; 500 m ISU	2. Lee Kyou-hyuk (KOR) 35.00	4. Keiichiro Nagashima (JPN); 5. Lee Kang-seok (KOR); 6. Joji Kato (JPN); 7. An Weijiang (CHN); 8. Dmitry Lobkov (RUS); 9. Yu Fengtong (CHN), 10. Mika Poutala (FIN); B 1. Simon Kuipers (NED)
7 Dec	Men; 500 m ISU	3. Mun Jun (KOR) 35.05	4. Keiichiro Nagashima (JPN); 5. Lee Kang-seok (KOR); 6. Joji Kato (JPN); 7. An Weijiang (CHN); 8. Dmitry Lobkov (RUS); 9. Yu Fengtong (CHN), 10. Mika Poutala (FIN); B 1. Simon Kuipers (NED)
7 Dec	Men; 500 m ISU	Wotherspoon was absent, leaving Fredricks, the defending World Cup winner and runner-up in the last Calgary race, to finish ahead of six Asians. Fredricks only had the fifth-fastest full lap, but an opening 100m of 9.50 ensured the win.	
7 Dec	Women; 3000 m ISU	1. Renate Groenewold (NED) 4:02.64	4. Claudia Pechstein (GER); 5. Kristina Groves (CAN); 6. Clara Hughes (CAN); 7. Daniela Anschütz-Thoms (GER); 8. Gretha Smit (NED); 9. Diane Valkenburg (NED), 10. Catherine Raney (USA); B 1. Paulien van Deutekom (NED)
7 Dec	Women; 3000 m ISU	2. Martina Sáblíková (CZE) 4:04.22	4. Claudia Pechstein (GER); 5. Kristina Groves (CAN); 6. Clara Hughes (CAN); 7. Daniela Anschütz-Thoms (GER); 8. Gretha Smit (NED); 9. Diane Valkenburg (NED), 10. Catherine Raney (USA); B 1. Paulien van Deutekom (NED)
7 Dec	Women; 3000 m ISU	3. Ireen Wüst (NED) 4:06.12	4. Claudia Pechstein (GER); 5. Kristina Groves (CAN); 6. Clara Hughes (CAN); 7. Daniela Anschütz-Thoms (GER); 8. Gretha Smit (NED); 9. Diane Valkenburg (NED), 10. Catherine Raney (USA); B 1. Paulien van Deutekom (NED)
7 Dec	Women; 3000 m ISU	Groenewold and Wüst, who skipped the trip to Russia, came back to record their best performances of the seasons. Groenewold took her first win since Berlin in November 2006, inflicting the first defeat on Sáblíková after staying below 32.2, while the Czech touched 32.5 on the final laps. Wüst, who took podium places in all starts on distances longer than 500m last year, now took her first World Cup podium of the season.	
7 Dec	Men; 1500 m ISU	1. Sven Kramer (NED) 1:45.21	4. Shani Davis (NED); 5. Simon Kuipers (NED); 6. Håvard Bøkko (NOR); 7. Ivan Skobrev (RUS); 8. Erben Wennemars (NED); 9. Chad Hedrick (USA), 10. Yevgeny Lalenkov (RUS); B 1. Gao Xuefeng (CHN)
7 Dec	Men; 1500 m ISU	2. Denny Morrison (CAN) 1:45.34	4. Shani Davis (NED); 5. Simon Kuipers (NED); 6. Håvard Bøkko (NOR); 7. Ivan Skobrev (RUS); 8. Erben Wennemars (NED); 9. Chad Hedrick (USA), 10. Yevgeny Lalenkov (RUS); B 1. Gao Xuefeng (CHN)
7 Dec	Men; 1500 m ISU	3. Mark Tuitert (NED) 1:45.54	4. Shani Davis (NED); 5. Simon Kuipers (NED); 6. Håvard Bøkko (NOR); 7. Ivan Skobrev (RUS); 8. Erben Wennemars (NED); 9. Chad Hedrick (USA), 10. Yevgeny Lalenkov (RUS); B 1. Gao Xuefeng (CHN)
7 Dec	Men; 1500 m ISU	Kramer's first victory on the distance, where his best previous achievement was a sixth place in the World Cup and a second place in the European Championship. The last lap of 27.86 seconds was decisive; Morrison and Tuitert lost over three-quarters of a second on the final lap. None of the top five in the World Cup reached the podium.	
8 Dec	Men; 500 m ISU	1. Lee Kang-seok (KOR) 34.92	4. Mika Poutala (FIN); 5. Lee Kyou-hyuk (KOR); 6. Tucker Fredricks (USA); 7. Dmitry Lobkov (RUS); 8. Keiichiro Nagashima (JPN) and Ki-Ho Lee (KOR), 10. Jan Smeekens (NED); B 1. Simon Kuipers (NED)
8 Dec	Men; 500 m ISU	2. Joji Kato (JPN) 34.94	4. Mika Poutala (FIN); 5. Lee Kyou-hyuk (KOR); 6. Tucker Fredricks (USA); 7. Dmitry Lobkov (RUS); 8. Keiichiro Nagashima (JPN) and Ki-Ho Lee (KOR), 10. Jan Smeekens (NED); B 1. Simon Kuipers (NED)
8 Dec	Men; 500 m ISU	3. Mun Jun (KOR) 34.96	4. Mika Poutala (FIN); 5. Lee Kyou-hyuk (KOR); 6. Tucker Fredricks (USA); 7. Dmitry Lobkov (RUS); 8. Keiichiro Nagashima (JPN) and Ki-Ho Lee (KOR), 10. Jan Smeekens (NED); B 1. Simon Kuipers (NED)
8 Dec	Men; 500 m ISU	Kang-Seok Lee took over the lead in the overall World Cup standings with his fifth career victory, and his first since December 2006. Kato's second place was his best performance on the distance since December 2005, while yesterday's winner Fredricks opened slower and finished 0.17 seconds down.	
8 Dec	Women; 1500 m ISU	1. Anni Friesinger (GER) 1:55.98	4. Paulien van Deutekom (NED); 5. Ireen Wüst (NED); 6. Claudia Pechstein (GER); 7. Cindy Klassen (CAN); 8. Renate Groenewold (NED); 9. Daniela Anschütz-Thoms (GER); 10. Diane Valkenburg (NED); B 1. Wang Fei (CHN)
8 Dec	Women; 1500 m ISU	2. Kristina Groves (CAN) 1:56.18	4. Paulien van Deutekom (NED); 5. Ireen Wüst (NED); 6. Claudia Pechstein (GER); 7. Cindy Klassen (CAN); 8. Renate Groenewold (NED); 9. Daniela Anschütz-Thoms (GER); 10. Diane Valkenburg (NED); B 1. Wang Fei (CHN)
8 Dec	Women; 1500 m ISU	3. Christine Nesbitt (CAN) 1:56.56	4. Paulien van Deutekom (NED); 5. Ireen Wüst (NED); 6. Claudia Pechstein (GER); 7. Cindy Klassen (CAN); 8. Renate Groenewold (NED); 9. Daniela Anschütz-Thoms (GER); 10. Diane Valkenburg (NED); B 1. Wang Fei (CHN)
8 Dec	Women; 1500 m ISU	Like in Kolomna, Friesinger beat Nesbitt by 0.6 seconds, though this time Friesinger gained her advantage on the final lap; Nesbitt was only 0.04 seconds behind at 1100 m. At that point, however, Nesbitt's pairmate Groves was equal with Friesinger, but could not keep up with Friesinger's final lap, the fifth-fastest of the day.	
8 Dec	Men; 5000 m ISU	1. Sven Kramer (NED) 6:15.26	4. Wouter olde Heuvel (NED); 5. Bob de Jong (NED); 6. Arne Dankers (CAN); 7. Chad Hedrick (USA); 8. Tobias Schneider (GER); 9. Odd Borgersen (NOR); 10. Tom Prinsen (NED); B 1. Arjen van der Kieft (NED)
8 Dec	Men; 5000 m ISU	2. Håvard Bøkko (NOR) 6:18.35	4. Wouter olde Heuvel (NED); 5. Bob de Jong (NED); 6. Arne Dankers (CAN); 7. Chad Hedrick (USA); 8. Tobias Schneider (GER); 9. Odd Borgersen (NOR); 10. Tom Prinsen (NED); B 1. Arjen van der Kieft (NED)
8 Dec	Men; 5000 m ISU	3. Shani Davis (USA) 6:21.36	4. Wouter olde Heuvel (NED); 5. Bob de Jong (NED); 6. Arne Dankers (CAN); 7. Chad Hedrick (USA); 8. Tobias Schneider (GER); 9. Odd Borgersen (NOR); 10. Tom Prinsen (NED); B 1. Arjen van der Kieft (NED)
8 Dec	Men; 5000 m ISU	Kramer returned with another win, becoming the first to win 1500 m and 5000 m in the same World Cup weekend for eight years. However, Fabris did not enter, and Verheijen rested after an injury sustained during the fall in Kolomna. In their absence, Davis took his first podium in a world meet on this distance.	
9 Dec	Women; 500 m ISU	1. Jenny Wolf (GER) 37.81	4. Annette Gerritsen (NED); 5. Sayuri Yoshii (JPN); 6. Sayuri Osuga (JPN); 7. Chiara Simionato (ITA); 8. Margot Boer (NED); 9. Svetlana Kaykan (RUS); 10. Xing Aihua (CHN); B 1. Elli Ochowicz (USA)
9 Dec	Women; 500 m ISU	2. Wang Beixing (CHN) 37.92	4. Annette Gerritsen (NED); 5. Sayuri Yoshii (JPN); 6. Sayuri Osuga (JPN); 7. Chiara Simionato (ITA); 8. Margot Boer (NED); 9. Svetlana Kaykan (RUS); 10. Xing Aihua (CHN); B 1. Elli Ochowicz (USA)
9 Dec	Women; 500 m ISU	3. Lee Sang-hwa (KOR) 38.59	4. Annette Gerritsen (NED); 5. Sayuri Yoshii (JPN); 6. Sayuri Osuga (JPN); 7. Chiara Simionato (ITA); 8. Margot Boer (NED); 9. Svetlana Kaykan (RUS); 10. Xing Aihua (CHN); B 1. Elli Ochowicz (USA)
9 Dec	Women; 500 m ISU	Wolf and Wang far ahead of the competition yet again, with Wolf taking her fourth first place and Wang her fourth runner-up spot. Lee Sang-hwa, No. 2 in the World Cup on this distance last season, took her first podium place of the year.	
9 Dec	Men; 1000 m ISU	1. Shani Davis (USA) 1:08.39	5. Jan Bos (NED); 6. Mun Jun (KOR); 7. Mark Tuitert (NED); 8. Mika Poutala (FIN); 9. Kip Carpenter (USA), 10. Håvard Bøkko (NOR); B 1. Aleksey Yesin (RUS)
9 Dec	Men; 1000 m ISU	2. Denny Morrison (CAN) 1:08.71	5. Jan Bos (NED); 6. Mun Jun (KOR); 7. Mark Tuitert (NED); 8. Mika Poutala (FIN); 9. Kip Carpenter (USA), 10. Håvard Bøkko (NOR); B 1. Aleksey Yesin (RUS)
9 Dec	Men; 1000 m ISU	3. Lee Kyou-hyuk (KOR) 1:08.80; Erben Wennemars (NED) 1:08.80	5. Jan Bos (NED); 6. Mun Jun (KOR); 7. Mark Tuitert (NED); 8. Mika Poutala (FIN); 9. Kip Carpenter (USA), 10. Håvard Bøkko (NOR); B 1. Aleksey Yesin (RUS)
9 Dec	Men; 1000 m ISU	Davis took his first World Cup victory of the season, taking a lead over Calgary winner Morrison at 600 metres and holding on with a fast final lap. Wennemars finished joint third for his first podium of the year. With Wotherspoon being absent, Davis took the overall lead.	
9 Dec	Women; 1000 m ISU	1. Anni Friesinger (GER) 1:15.34	5. Kristina Groves (CAN); 6. Ireen Wüst (NED); 7. Shannon Rempel (CAN); 8. Cindy Klassen (CAN); 9. Marianne Timmer (NED), 10. Sayuri Yoshii (JPN); B 1. Kim You-Lim (KOR)
9 Dec	Women; 1000 m ISU	2. Christine Nesbitt (CAN) 1:15.66	5. Kristina Groves (CAN); 6. Ireen Wüst (NED); 7. Shannon Rempel (CAN); 8. Cindy Klassen (CAN); 9. Marianne Timmer (NED), 10. Sayuri Yoshii (JPN); B 1. Kim You-Lim (KOR)
9 Dec	Women; 1000 m ISU	3. Chiara Simionato (ITA) 1:16.14; Wang Beixing (CHN) 1:16.14	5. Kristina Groves (CAN); 6. Ireen Wüst (NED); 7. Shannon Rempel (CAN); 8. Cindy Klassen (CAN); 9. Marianne Timmer (NED), 10. Sayuri Yoshii (JPN); B 1. Kim You-Lim (KOR)
9 Dec	Women; 1000 m ISU	Friesinger and Nesbitt, first and second in Calgary and first and third in the overall standings, faced off in the eighth pair. Friesinger took the lead through the first outer lane, and increased it up to 600 metres, where she had the inner lane. Despite Nesbitt gaining on her through the last inner, Friesinger took her second victory on the distance this season.	
9 Dec	Men; Team pursuit ISU	1. Netherlands (Kramer, W. olde Heuvel, Wennemars) 3:40.57	4. Norway; 5. Germany; 6. Italy; 7. Poland; 8. Sweden; 9. Japan, 10. France
9 Dec	Men; Team pursuit ISU	2. Canada (Dankers, Morrison, Warsylewicz) 3:42.82	4. Norway; 5. Germany; 6. Italy; 7. Poland; 8. Sweden; 9. Japan, 10. France
9 Dec	Men; Team pursuit ISU	3. Russia (Lalenkov, Skobrev, Yunin) 3:45.22	4. Norway; 5. Germany; 6. Italy; 7. Poland; 8. Sweden; 9. Japan, 10. France
9 Dec	Men; Team pursuit ISU	A totally changed Dutch team, which only lacked an injured Verheijen from the 2007 gold-winning line-up, set an early best time that Canada, the winners from Calgary, simply could not match. Norway were level with Russia with half a lap to go in the fight for third, but finished fourth.	
9 Dec	Women; Team pursuit ISU	1. Netherlands (van Deutekom, Groenewold, Valkenburg) 3:00.54	4. Japan; 5. Germany; 6. United States; 7. Poland; 8. Romania, 9. Belarus
9 Dec	Women; Team pursuit ISU	2. Canada (Klassen, Nesbitt, Schussler) 3:02.87	4. Japan; 5. Germany; 6. United States; 7. Poland; 8. Romania, 9. Belarus
9 Dec	Women; Team pursuit ISU	3. Russia (Abramova, Lobysheva, Likhachova) 3:03.81	4. Japan; 5. Germany; 6. United States; 7. Poland; 8. Romania, 9. Belarus
9 Dec	Women; Team pursuit ISU	As in the men's event, the Dutch women had a team considerably changed from Calgary, and reaped the rewards. However, in this race the Germans did not line up with any of their winners from Calgary, and Canada also changed two members of their Calgary team.	

=== WC 5, Erfurt, Germany, 15–16 December ===
==== Race results ====
Date	Event	Podium	Top 10 + B-group
15 Dec	Women; 500 m ISU	1. Jenny Wolf (GER) 38.00	4. Zhang Shuang (CHN); 5. Margot Boer (NED); 6. Svetlana Kaykan (RUS); 7. Xing Aihua (CHN); 8. Lee Sang-hwa (KOR); 9. Marianne Timmer (NED), 10. Chiara Simionato (ITA); B 1. Cindy Klassen (CAN)
15 Dec	Women; 500 m ISU	2. Anni Friesinger (GER) 38.61	4. Zhang Shuang (CHN); 5. Margot Boer (NED); 6. Svetlana Kaykan (RUS); 7. Xing Aihua (CHN); 8. Lee Sang-hwa (KOR); 9. Marianne Timmer (NED), 10. Chiara Simionato (ITA); B 1. Cindy Klassen (CAN)
15 Dec	Women; 500 m ISU	3. Annette Gerritsen (NED) 38.68	4. Zhang Shuang (CHN); 5. Margot Boer (NED); 6. Svetlana Kaykan (RUS); 7. Xing Aihua (CHN); 8. Lee Sang-hwa (KOR); 9. Marianne Timmer (NED), 10. Chiara Simionato (ITA); B 1. Cindy Klassen (CAN)
15 Dec	Men; 500 m ISU	1. Lee Kang-seok (KOR) 35.22	4. Tucker Fredricks (USA); 5. Mika Poutala (FIN); 6. Yu Fengtong (CHN); 7. Mike Ireland (CAN); 8. Jan Bos (NED); 9. Vincent Labrie (CAN), 10. Simon Kuipers (NED); B 1. Jiao Yunlong (CHN)
15 Dec	Men; 500 m ISU	2. Dmitry Lobkov (RUS) 35.24	4. Tucker Fredricks (USA); 5. Mika Poutala (FIN); 6. Yu Fengtong (CHN); 7. Mike Ireland (CAN); 8. Jan Bos (NED); 9. Vincent Labrie (CAN), 10. Simon Kuipers (NED); B 1. Jiao Yunlong (CHN)
15 Dec	Men; 500 m ISU	3. Lee Kyou-hyuk (KOR) 35.31	4. Tucker Fredricks (USA); 5. Mika Poutala (FIN); 6. Yu Fengtong (CHN); 7. Mike Ireland (CAN); 8. Jan Bos (NED); 9. Vincent Labrie (CAN), 10. Simon Kuipers (NED); B 1. Jiao Yunlong (CHN)
15 Dec	Women; 1000 m ISU	1. Anni Friesinger (GER) 1:15.71	4. Ireen Wüst (NED); 5. Annette Gerritsen (NED); 6. Shannon Rempel (CAN); 7. Marrit Leenstra (NED); 8. Margot Boer (NED); 9. Marianne Timmer (NED), 10. Pamela Zöllner (GER); B 1. Natalya Rybakova (KAZ)
15 Dec	Women; 1000 m ISU	2. Chiara Simionato (ITA) 1:16.46	4. Ireen Wüst (NED); 5. Annette Gerritsen (NED); 6. Shannon Rempel (CAN); 7. Marrit Leenstra (NED); 8. Margot Boer (NED); 9. Marianne Timmer (NED), 10. Pamela Zöllner (GER); B 1. Natalya Rybakova (KAZ)
15 Dec	Women; 1000 m ISU	3. Cindy Klassen (CAN) 1:16.48	4. Ireen Wüst (NED); 5. Annette Gerritsen (NED); 6. Shannon Rempel (CAN); 7. Marrit Leenstra (NED); 8. Margot Boer (NED); 9. Marianne Timmer (NED), 10. Pamela Zöllner (GER); B 1. Natalya Rybakova (KAZ)
15 Dec	Men; 1000 m ISU	1. Shani Davis (USA) 1:09.05	4. Jan Bos (NED); 5. Simon Kuipers (NED); 6. Mark Tuitert (NED); 7. Mika Poutala (FIN); 8. Remco olde Heuvel (NED); 9. Mikael Flygind-Larsen (NOR), 10. Lee Ki-ho (KOR); B 1. Maciej Ustynowicz (POL)
15 Dec	Men; 1000 m ISU	2. Denny Morrison (CAN) 1:09.33	4. Jan Bos (NED); 5. Simon Kuipers (NED); 6. Mark Tuitert (NED); 7. Mika Poutala (FIN); 8. Remco olde Heuvel (NED); 9. Mikael Flygind-Larsen (NOR), 10. Lee Ki-ho (KOR); B 1. Maciej Ustynowicz (POL)
15 Dec	Men; 1000 m ISU	3. Mun Jun (KOR) 1:09.49	4. Jan Bos (NED); 5. Simon Kuipers (NED); 6. Mark Tuitert (NED); 7. Mika Poutala (FIN); 8. Remco olde Heuvel (NED); 9. Mikael Flygind-Larsen (NOR), 10. Lee Ki-ho (KOR); B 1. Maciej Ustynowicz (POL)
16 Dec	Women; 500 m ISU	1. Jenny Wolf (GER) 37.88	4. Xing Aihua (CHN); 5. Margot Boer (NED); 6. Anni Friesinger (GER); 7. Zhang Shuang (CHN); 8. Chiara Simionato (ITA); 9. Judith Hesse (GER), 10. Svetlana Kaykan (RUS); B 1. Cindy Klassen (CAN)
16 Dec	Women; 500 m ISU	2. Annette Gerritsen (NED) 38.72	4. Xing Aihua (CHN); 5. Margot Boer (NED); 6. Anni Friesinger (GER); 7. Zhang Shuang (CHN); 8. Chiara Simionato (ITA); 9. Judith Hesse (GER), 10. Svetlana Kaykan (RUS); B 1. Cindy Klassen (CAN)
16 Dec	Women; 500 m ISU	3. Lee Sang-hwa (KOR) 38.76	4. Xing Aihua (CHN); 5. Margot Boer (NED); 6. Anni Friesinger (GER); 7. Zhang Shuang (CHN); 8. Chiara Simionato (ITA); 9. Judith Hesse (GER), 10. Svetlana Kaykan (RUS); B 1. Cindy Klassen (CAN)
16 Dec	Men; 500 m ISU	1. Lee Kang-seok (KOR) 35.17	4. Jan Smeekens (NED); 5. Yu Fengtong (CHN); 6. Lee Ki-ho (KOR) and Lee Kyou-hyuk (KOR); 8. Vincent Labrie (CAN); 9. Mika Poutala (FIN), 10. Dmitry Lobkov (RUS); B 1. Dag Erik Kleven (NOR)
16 Dec	Men; 500 m ISU	2. Mun Jun (KOR) 35.21	4. Jan Smeekens (NED); 5. Yu Fengtong (CHN); 6. Lee Ki-ho (KOR) and Lee Kyou-hyuk (KOR); 8. Vincent Labrie (CAN); 9. Mika Poutala (FIN), 10. Dmitry Lobkov (RUS); B 1. Dag Erik Kleven (NOR)
16 Dec	Men; 500 m ISU	3. Simon Kuipers (NED) 35.26	4. Jan Smeekens (NED); 5. Yu Fengtong (CHN); 6. Lee Ki-ho (KOR) and Lee Kyou-hyuk (KOR); 8. Vincent Labrie (CAN); 9. Mika Poutala (FIN), 10. Dmitry Lobkov (RUS); B 1. Dag Erik Kleven (NOR)
16 Dec	Women; 1000 m ISU	1. Anni Friesinger (GER) 1:15.64	4. Cindy Klassen (CAN); 5. Marianne Timmer (NED); 6. Shannon Rempel (CAN); 7. Annette Gerritsen (NED); 8. Margot Boer (NED); 9. Marrit Leenstra (NED), 10. Pamela Zöllner (GER); B 1. Jin Peiyu (CHN)
16 Dec	Women; 1000 m ISU	2. Ireen Wüst (NED) 1:16.11	4. Cindy Klassen (CAN); 5. Marianne Timmer (NED); 6. Shannon Rempel (CAN); 7. Annette Gerritsen (NED); 8. Margot Boer (NED); 9. Marrit Leenstra (NED), 10. Pamela Zöllner (GER); B 1. Jin Peiyu (CHN)
16 Dec	Women; 1000 m ISU	3. Chiara Simionato (ITA) 1:16.49	4. Cindy Klassen (CAN); 5. Marianne Timmer (NED); 6. Shannon Rempel (CAN); 7. Annette Gerritsen (NED); 8. Margot Boer (NED); 9. Marrit Leenstra (NED), 10. Pamela Zöllner (GER); B 1. Jin Peiyu (CHN)
16 Dec	Men; 1000 m ISU	1. Jan Bos (NED) 1:08.98	4. Denny Morrison (CAN); 5. Erben Wennemars (NED); 6. Lee Kyou-hyuk (KOR); 7. Simon Kuipers (NED); 8. Lee Kang-seok (KOR); 9. Kip Carpenter (USA), 10. Mikael Flygind-Larsen (NOR); B 1. Maciej Ustynowicz (POL)
16 Dec	Men; 1000 m ISU	2. Shani Davis (USA) 1:09.02	4. Denny Morrison (CAN); 5. Erben Wennemars (NED); 6. Lee Kyou-hyuk (KOR); 7. Simon Kuipers (NED); 8. Lee Kang-seok (KOR); 9. Kip Carpenter (USA), 10. Mikael Flygind-Larsen (NOR); B 1. Maciej Ustynowicz (POL)
16 Dec	Men; 1000 m ISU	3. Mun Jun (KOR)1:09.26	4. Denny Morrison (CAN); 5. Erben Wennemars (NED); 6. Lee Kyou-hyuk (KOR); 7. Simon Kuipers (NED); 8. Lee Kang-seok (KOR); 9. Kip Carpenter (USA), 10. Mikael Flygind-Larsen (NOR); B 1. Maciej Ustynowicz (POL)
16 Dec	Women; 100 m ISU	1. Jenny Wolf (GER)	4. Lee Sang-hwa (KOR); 5. Zhang Shuang (CHN); 6. Jin Peiyu (CHN); 7. Kim Weger (CAN); 8. Paulina Wallin (SWE); 9. Lee Bo-ra (KOR), 10. Annette Gerritsen (NED)
16 Dec	Women; 100 m ISU	2. Xing Aihua (CHN)	4. Lee Sang-hwa (KOR); 5. Zhang Shuang (CHN); 6. Jin Peiyu (CHN); 7. Kim Weger (CAN); 8. Paulina Wallin (SWE); 9. Lee Bo-ra (KOR), 10. Annette Gerritsen (NED)
16 Dec	Women; 100 m ISU	3. Judith Hesse (GER)	4. Lee Sang-hwa (KOR); 5. Zhang Shuang (CHN); 6. Jin Peiyu (CHN); 7. Kim Weger (CAN); 8. Paulina Wallin (SWE); 9. Lee Bo-ra (KOR), 10. Annette Gerritsen (NED)
16 Dec	Men; 100 m ISU	1. Lee Kang-seok (KOR)	4. Jan Smeekens (NED); 5. Mika Poutala (FIN); 6. Maciej Ustynowicz (POL); 7. Vincent Labrie (CAN); 8. Markus Puolakka (FIN); 9. Jurre Trouw (NED), 10. Tucker Fredricks (USA)
16 Dec	Men; 100 m ISU	2. Yu Fengtong (CHN)	4. Jan Smeekens (NED); 5. Mika Poutala (FIN); 6. Maciej Ustynowicz (POL); 7. Vincent Labrie (CAN); 8. Markus Puolakka (FIN); 9. Jurre Trouw (NED), 10. Tucker Fredricks (USA)
16 Dec	Men; 100 m ISU	3. Zhang Zhongqi (CHN)	4. Jan Smeekens (NED); 5. Mika Poutala (FIN); 6. Maciej Ustynowicz (POL); 7. Vincent Labrie (CAN); 8. Markus Puolakka (FIN); 9. Jurre Trouw (NED), 10. Tucker Fredricks (USA)

=== WC 6, Hamar, Norway, 25–27 January ===
==== Race results ====
Date	Event	Podium	Top 10 + B-group
25 Jan	Women; 500 m ISU	1. Jenny Wolf (GER) 37.52	4. Shannon Rempel (CAN); 5. Pamela Zöllner (GER); 6. Heike Hartmann (GER); 7. Svetlana Kaykan (RUS); 8. Sayuri Yoshii (JPN); 9. Annette Gerritsen (NED), 10. Yuliya Nemaya (RUS); B 1. Ireen Wüst (NED)
25 Jan	Women; 500 m ISU	2. Lee Sang-hwa (KOR) 38.07	4. Shannon Rempel (CAN); 5. Pamela Zöllner (GER); 6. Heike Hartmann (GER); 7. Svetlana Kaykan (RUS); 8. Sayuri Yoshii (JPN); 9. Annette Gerritsen (NED), 10. Yuliya Nemaya (RUS); B 1. Ireen Wüst (NED)
25 Jan	Women; 500 m ISU	3. Marianne Timmer (NED) 38.23	4. Shannon Rempel (CAN); 5. Pamela Zöllner (GER); 6. Heike Hartmann (GER); 7. Svetlana Kaykan (RUS); 8. Sayuri Yoshii (JPN); 9. Annette Gerritsen (NED), 10. Yuliya Nemaya (RUS); B 1. Ireen Wüst (NED)
25 Jan	Men; 500 m ISU	1. Jeremy Wotherspoon (CAN) 34.55	4. Mun Jun (KOR); 5. Dmitry Lobkov (RUS); 6. Lee Kyou-hyuk (KOR); 7. Mika Poutala (FIN); 8. Simon Kuipers (NED); 9. Lee Kang-seok (KOR) and Kip Carpenter (USA); B 1. Jacques de Koning (NED)
25 Jan	Men; 500 m ISU	2. Keiichiro Nagashima (JPN) 34.74	4. Mun Jun (KOR); 5. Dmitry Lobkov (RUS); 6. Lee Kyou-hyuk (KOR); 7. Mika Poutala (FIN); 8. Simon Kuipers (NED); 9. Lee Kang-seok (KOR) and Kip Carpenter (USA); B 1. Jacques de Koning (NED)
25 Jan	Men; 500 m ISU	3. Pekka Koskela (FIN) 34.77	4. Mun Jun (KOR); 5. Dmitry Lobkov (RUS); 6. Lee Kyou-hyuk (KOR); 7. Mika Poutala (FIN); 8. Simon Kuipers (NED); 9. Lee Kang-seok (KOR) and Kip Carpenter (USA); B 1. Jacques de Koning (NED)
25 Jan	Women; 1500 m ISU	1. Ireen Wüst (NED) 1:54.65	4. Kristina Groves (CAN); 5. Shannon Rempel (CAN); 6. Claudia Pechstein (GER); 7. Daniela Anschütz-Thoms (GER); 8. Cindy Klassen (CAN); 9. Jorien Voorhuis (NED), 10. Martina Sáblíková (CZE); B 1. Yekaterina Abramova (RUS)
25 Jan	Women; 1500 m ISU	2. Paulien van Deutekom (NED) 1:56.84	4. Kristina Groves (CAN); 5. Shannon Rempel (CAN); 6. Claudia Pechstein (GER); 7. Daniela Anschütz-Thoms (GER); 8. Cindy Klassen (CAN); 9. Jorien Voorhuis (NED), 10. Martina Sáblíková (CZE); B 1. Yekaterina Abramova (RUS)
25 Jan	Women; 1500 m ISU	3. Christine Nesbitt (CAN) 1:57.14	4. Kristina Groves (CAN); 5. Shannon Rempel (CAN); 6. Claudia Pechstein (GER); 7. Daniela Anschütz-Thoms (GER); 8. Cindy Klassen (CAN); 9. Jorien Voorhuis (NED), 10. Martina Sáblíková (CZE); B 1. Yekaterina Abramova (RUS)
26 Jan	Women; 500 m ISU	1. Jenny Wolf (GER) 37.52	4. Marianne Timmer (NED); 5. Svetlana Kaykan (RUS); 6. Yuliya Nemaya (RUS); 7. Shannon Rempel (CAN); 8. Pamela Zöllner (GER); 9. Lee Bo-ra (KOR), 10. Heike Hartmann (GER); B 1. Monique Angermoeller (GER)
26 Jan	Women; 500 m ISU	2. Lee Sang-hwa (KOR) 38.19	4. Marianne Timmer (NED); 5. Svetlana Kaykan (RUS); 6. Yuliya Nemaya (RUS); 7. Shannon Rempel (CAN); 8. Pamela Zöllner (GER); 9. Lee Bo-ra (KOR), 10. Heike Hartmann (GER); B 1. Monique Angermoeller (GER)
26 Jan	Women; 500 m ISU	3. Annette Gerritsen (NED) 38.33	4. Marianne Timmer (NED); 5. Svetlana Kaykan (RUS); 6. Yuliya Nemaya (RUS); 7. Shannon Rempel (CAN); 8. Pamela Zöllner (GER); 9. Lee Bo-ra (KOR), 10. Heike Hartmann (GER); B 1. Monique Angermoeller (GER)
26 Jan	Men; 500 m ISU	1. Jeremy Wotherspoon (CAN) 34.31	4. Lee Ki-ho (KOR); 5. Lee Kang-seok (KOR); 6. Keiichiro Nagashima (JPN); 7. Kip Carpenter (USA); 8. Jan Smeekens (NED) and Dmitry Lobkov (RUS), 10. Tucker Fredricks (USA); B 1. Jacques de Koning (NED)
26 Jan	Men; 500 m ISU	2. Mun Jun (KOR) 34.75	4. Lee Ki-ho (KOR); 5. Lee Kang-seok (KOR); 6. Keiichiro Nagashima (JPN); 7. Kip Carpenter (USA); 8. Jan Smeekens (NED) and Dmitry Lobkov (RUS), 10. Tucker Fredricks (USA); B 1. Jacques de Koning (NED)
26 Jan	Men; 500 m ISU	3. Mika Poutala (FIN) 34.88	4. Lee Ki-ho (KOR); 5. Lee Kang-seok (KOR); 6. Keiichiro Nagashima (JPN); 7. Kip Carpenter (USA); 8. Jan Smeekens (NED) and Dmitry Lobkov (RUS), 10. Tucker Fredricks (USA); B 1. Jacques de Koning (NED)
26 Jan	Women; 5000 m ISU	1. Martina Sáblíková (CZE) ti.me 6:51.83	4. Daniela Anschütz-Thoms (GER); 5. Kristina Groves (CAN); 6. Cindy Klassen (CAN); 7. Paulien van Deutekom (NED); 8. Diane Valkenburg (NED); 9. Maren Haugli (NOR), 10. Catherine Raney (USA); B 1. Eriko Ishino (JPN)
26 Jan	Women; 5000 m ISU	2. Claudia Pechstein (GER) 6:56.57	4. Daniela Anschütz-Thoms (GER); 5. Kristina Groves (CAN); 6. Cindy Klassen (CAN); 7. Paulien van Deutekom (NED); 8. Diane Valkenburg (NED); 9. Maren Haugli (NOR), 10. Catherine Raney (USA); B 1. Eriko Ishino (JPN)
26 Jan	Women; 5000 m ISU	3. Clara Hughes (CAN) 7:01.44	4. Daniela Anschütz-Thoms (GER); 5. Kristina Groves (CAN); 6. Cindy Klassen (CAN); 7. Paulien van Deutekom (NED); 8. Diane Valkenburg (NED); 9. Maren Haugli (NOR), 10. Catherine Raney (USA); B 1. Eriko Ishino (JPN)
26 Jan	Men; 1500 m ISU	1. Simon Kuipers (NED) 1:44.74	4. Håvard Bøkko (NOR); 5. Mark Tuitert (NED); 6. Erben Wennemars (NED); 7. Yevgeny Lalenkov (RUS); 8. Chad Hedrick (USA); 9. Konrad Niedźwiedzki (POL), 10. Ivan Skobrev (RUS); B 1. Wouter olde Heuvel (NED)
26 Jan	Men; 1500 m ISU	2. Sven Kramer (NED) 1:44.75	4. Håvard Bøkko (NOR); 5. Mark Tuitert (NED); 6. Erben Wennemars (NED); 7. Yevgeny Lalenkov (RUS); 8. Chad Hedrick (USA); 9. Konrad Niedźwiedzki (POL), 10. Ivan Skobrev (RUS); B 1. Wouter olde Heuvel (NED)
26 Jan	Men; 1500 m ISU	3. Denny Morrison (CAN) 1:44.82	4. Håvard Bøkko (NOR); 5. Mark Tuitert (NED); 6. Erben Wennemars (NED); 7. Yevgeny Lalenkov (RUS); 8. Chad Hedrick (USA); 9. Konrad Niedźwiedzki (POL), 10. Ivan Skobrev (RUS); B 1. Wouter olde Heuvel (NED)
27 Jan	Men; 1000 m ISU	1. Denny Morrison (CAN) 1:08.57	4. Mun Jun (KOR); 5. Mika Poutala (FIN); 6. Lee Kyou-hyuk (KOR); 7. Erben Wennemars (NED); 8. Yevgeny Lalenkov (RUS); 9. Dag Erik Kleven (NOR), 10. Jan Bos (NED); B 1. Lars Elgersma (NED)
27 Jan	Men; 1000 m ISU	2. Simon Kuipers (NED) 1:08.58	4. Mun Jun (KOR); 5. Mika Poutala (FIN); 6. Lee Kyou-hyuk (KOR); 7. Erben Wennemars (NED); 8. Yevgeny Lalenkov (RUS); 9. Dag Erik Kleven (NOR), 10. Jan Bos (NED); B 1. Lars Elgersma (NED)
27 Jan	Men; 1000 m ISU	3. Jeremy Wotherspoon (CAN) 1:08.59	4. Mun Jun (KOR); 5. Mika Poutala (FIN); 6. Lee Kyou-hyuk (KOR); 7. Erben Wennemars (NED); 8. Yevgeny Lalenkov (RUS); 9. Dag Erik Kleven (NOR), 10. Jan Bos (NED); B 1. Lars Elgersma (NED)
27 Jan	Women; 1000 m ISU	1. Anni Friesinger (GER) 1:14.81	4. Kristina Groves (CAN); 5. Paulien van Deutekom (NED); 6. Shannon Rempel (CAN); 7. Annette Gerritsen (NED); 8. Marianne Timmer (NED); 9. Cindy Klassen (CAN), 10. Pamela Zöllner (GER); B 1. Yekaterina Lobysheva (RUS)
27 Jan	Women; 1000 m ISU	2. Christine Nesbitt (CAN) 1:15.84	4. Kristina Groves (CAN); 5. Paulien van Deutekom (NED); 6. Shannon Rempel (CAN); 7. Annette Gerritsen (NED); 8. Marianne Timmer (NED); 9. Cindy Klassen (CAN), 10. Pamela Zöllner (GER); B 1. Yekaterina Lobysheva (RUS)
27 Jan	Women; 1000 m ISU	3. Ireen Wüst (NED) 1:15.85	4. Kristina Groves (CAN); 5. Paulien van Deutekom (NED); 6. Shannon Rempel (CAN); 7. Annette Gerritsen (NED); 8. Marianne Timmer (NED); 9. Cindy Klassen (CAN), 10. Pamela Zöllner (GER); B 1. Yekaterina Lobysheva (RUS)
27 Jan	Men; 10 000 m ISU	1. Håvard Bøkko (NOR) 13:09.61	4. Øystein Grødum (NOR); 5. Marco Weber (GER); 6. Justin Warsylewicz (CAN); 7. Sverre Haugli (NOR); 8. Hiroki Hirako (JPN); 9. Odd Borgersen (NOR), 10. Dmitry Babenko (KAZ); B 1. Mark Ooijevaar (NED)
27 Jan	Men; 10 000 m ISU	2. Chad Hedrick (USA) 13:11.20	4. Øystein Grødum (NOR); 5. Marco Weber (GER); 6. Justin Warsylewicz (CAN); 7. Sverre Haugli (NOR); 8. Hiroki Hirako (JPN); 9. Odd Borgersen (NOR), 10. Dmitry Babenko (KAZ); B 1. Mark Ooijevaar (NED)
27 Jan	Men; 10 000 m ISU	3. Bob de Jong (NED) 13:12.71	4. Øystein Grødum (NOR); 5. Marco Weber (GER); 6. Justin Warsylewicz (CAN); 7. Sverre Haugli (NOR); 8. Hiroki Hirako (JPN); 9. Odd Borgersen (NOR), 10. Dmitry Babenko (KAZ); B 1. Mark Ooijevaar (NED)

=== WC 7, Baselga di Piné, Italy, 2–3 February ===
==== Race results ====
Date	Event	Podium	Top 10 + B-group
2 Feb	Women; 1500 m ISU	1. Kristina Groves (CAN) 2:01.07	4. Jorien Voorhuis (NED); 5. Catherine Raney (USA); 6. Masako Hozumi (JPN); 7. Monique Angermoeller (GER); 8. Claudia Pechstein (GER); 9. Anni Friesinger (GER); 10. Brittany Schussler (CAN); B 1. Eriko Ishino (JPN)
2 Feb	Women; 1500 m ISU	2. Martina Sáblíková (CZE) 2:02.93	4. Jorien Voorhuis (NED); 5. Catherine Raney (USA); 6. Masako Hozumi (JPN); 7. Monique Angermoeller (GER); 8. Claudia Pechstein (GER); 9. Anni Friesinger (GER); 10. Brittany Schussler (CAN); B 1. Eriko Ishino (JPN)
2 Feb	Women; 1500 m ISU	3. Christine Nesbitt (CAN) 2:02.98	4. Jorien Voorhuis (NED); 5. Catherine Raney (USA); 6. Masako Hozumi (JPN); 7. Monique Angermoeller (GER); 8. Claudia Pechstein (GER); 9. Anni Friesinger (GER); 10. Brittany Schussler (CAN); B 1. Eriko Ishino (JPN)
2 Feb	Men; 5000 m ISU		
2 Feb	Men; 5000 m ISU	Race cancelled after 4 pairs	
3 Feb	Women; 3000 m ISU	1. Martina Sáblíková (CZE) 4:11.09	4. Masako Hozumi (JPN); 5. Catherine Raney (USA); 6. Jorien Voorhuis (NED); 7. Eriko Ishino (JPN); 8. Stephanie Beckert (GER); 9. Hiromi Otsu (JPN); 10. Maki Tabata (JPN); B 1. Maria Lamb (USA)
3 Feb	Women; 3000 m ISU	2. Claudia Pechstein (GER) 4:14.20	4. Masako Hozumi (JPN); 5. Catherine Raney (USA); 6. Jorien Voorhuis (NED); 7. Eriko Ishino (JPN); 8. Stephanie Beckert (GER); 9. Hiromi Otsu (JPN); 10. Maki Tabata (JPN); B 1. Maria Lamb (USA)
3 Feb	Women; 3000 m ISU	3. Katrin Mattscherodt (GER) 4:15.03	4. Masako Hozumi (JPN); 5. Catherine Raney (USA); 6. Jorien Voorhuis (NED); 7. Eriko Ishino (JPN); 8. Stephanie Beckert (GER); 9. Hiromi Otsu (JPN); 10. Maki Tabata (JPN); B 1. Maria Lamb (USA)
3 Feb	Men; 1500 m ISU	1. Shani Davis (USA) 1:46.85	4. Enrico Fabris (ITA); 5. Yevgeny Lalenkov (RUS); 6. Håvard Bøkko (NOR); 7. Chad Hedrick (USA); 8. Steven Elm (CAN); 9. Jay Morrison (CAN); 10. Erben Wennemars (NED); B 1. Beorn Nijenhuis (NED)
3 Feb	Men; 1500 m ISU	2. Simon Kuipers (NED) 1:47.39	4. Enrico Fabris (ITA); 5. Yevgeny Lalenkov (RUS); 6. Håvard Bøkko (NOR); 7. Chad Hedrick (USA); 8. Steven Elm (CAN); 9. Jay Morrison (CAN); 10. Erben Wennemars (NED); B 1. Beorn Nijenhuis (NED)
3 Feb	Men; 1500 m ISU	3. Mark Tuitert (NED) 1:47.68	4. Enrico Fabris (ITA); 5. Yevgeny Lalenkov (RUS); 6. Håvard Bøkko (NOR); 7. Chad Hedrick (USA); 8. Steven Elm (CAN); 9. Jay Morrison (CAN); 10. Erben Wennemars (NED); B 1. Beorn Nijenhuis (NED)
3 Feb	Women; Team pursuit ISU	1. Russia (Lobysheva, Abramova, Likhachova) 3:11.62	4. Germany; 5. United States; 6. Romania; 7. Canada
3 Feb	Women; Team pursuit ISU	2. Japan (Tabata, Otsu, Hozumi) 3:11.91	4. Germany; 5. United States; 6. Romania; 7. Canada
3 Feb	Women; Team pursuit ISU	3. Poland (Wójcicka, Ksyt, Zlotkowska) 3:15.57	4. Germany; 5. United States; 6. Romania; 7. Canada
3 Feb	Men; Team pursuit ISU	1. Norway (Bøkko, Christiansen, Haugli) 3:53.10	4. Canada; 5. Poland; 6. Italy; 7. Sweden; 8. Germany; 9. United States; 10. Japan
3 Feb	Men; Team pursuit ISU	2. Netherlands (Wennemars, Verheijen, Bloemen) 3:53.38	4. Canada; 5. Poland; 6. Italy; 7. Sweden; 8. Germany; 9. United States; 10. Japan
3 Feb	Men; Team pursuit ISU	3. Russia (Skobrev, Lalenkov, Yunin) 3:53.47	4. Canada; 5. Poland; 6. Italy; 7. Sweden; 8. Germany; 9. United States; 10. Japan

=== WC 8, Inzell, Germany, 16–17 February ===
==== Race results ====
Date	Event	Podium	Top 10 + B-group
16 Feb	Women; 500 m ISU	1. Jenny Wolf (GER) 38.66	5. Nao Kodaira (JPN); 6. Judith Hesse (GER); 7. Marianne Timmer (NED); 8. Pamela Zöllner (GER); 9. Shihomi Shinya (JPN), 10. Natasja Bruintjes (NED); B 1. Ingeborg Kroon (NED)
16 Feb	Women; 500 m ISU	2. Annette Gerritsen (NED) 39.54	5. Nao Kodaira (JPN); 6. Judith Hesse (GER); 7. Marianne Timmer (NED); 8. Pamela Zöllner (GER); 9. Shihomi Shinya (JPN), 10. Natasja Bruintjes (NED); B 1. Ingeborg Kroon (NED)
16 Feb	Women; 500 m ISU	3. Sayuri Yoshii (JPN) 39.61; Svetlana Kaykan (RUS) 39.61	5. Nao Kodaira (JPN); 6. Judith Hesse (GER); 7. Marianne Timmer (NED); 8. Pamela Zöllner (GER); 9. Shihomi Shinya (JPN), 10. Natasja Bruintjes (NED); B 1. Ingeborg Kroon (NED)
16 Feb	Men; 500 m ISU	1. Joji Kato (JPN) 35.48	4. Dmitry Lobkov (RUS); 5. Mika Poutala (FIN); 6. Mike Ireland (CAN); 7. Tucker Fredricks (USA); 8. Vincent Labrie (CAN) and Kip Carpenter (USA); 10. Tadashi Obara (JPN); B 1. Hiroyasu Shimizu (JPN)
16 Feb	Men; 500 m ISU	2. Jeremy Wotherspoon (CAN) 35.61	4. Dmitry Lobkov (RUS); 5. Mika Poutala (FIN); 6. Mike Ireland (CAN); 7. Tucker Fredricks (USA); 8. Vincent Labrie (CAN) and Kip Carpenter (USA); 10. Tadashi Obara (JPN); B 1. Hiroyasu Shimizu (JPN)
16 Feb	Men; 500 m ISU	3. Keiichiro Nagashima (JPN) 35.82	4. Dmitry Lobkov (RUS); 5. Mika Poutala (FIN); 6. Mike Ireland (CAN); 7. Tucker Fredricks (USA); 8. Vincent Labrie (CAN) and Kip Carpenter (USA); 10. Tadashi Obara (JPN); B 1. Hiroyasu Shimizu (JPN)
16 Feb	Women; 1000 m ISU	1. Anni Friesinger (GER) 1:17.78	4. Paulien van Deutekom (NED); 5. Brittany Schussler (CAN); 6. Annette Gerritsen (NED); 7. Sayuri Yoshii (JPN); 8. Marianne Timmer (NED); 9. Heike Hartmann (GER), 10. Jorien Voorhuis (NED); B 1. Kerry Simpson (CAN)
16 Feb	Women; 1000 m ISU	2. Ireen Wüst (NED) 1:18.79	4. Paulien van Deutekom (NED); 5. Brittany Schussler (CAN); 6. Annette Gerritsen (NED); 7. Sayuri Yoshii (JPN); 8. Marianne Timmer (NED); 9. Heike Hartmann (GER), 10. Jorien Voorhuis (NED); B 1. Kerry Simpson (CAN)
16 Feb	Women; 1000 m ISU	3. Shannon Rempel (CAN) 1:19.24	4. Paulien van Deutekom (NED); 5. Brittany Schussler (CAN); 6. Annette Gerritsen (NED); 7. Sayuri Yoshii (JPN); 8. Marianne Timmer (NED); 9. Heike Hartmann (GER), 10. Jorien Voorhuis (NED); B 1. Kerry Simpson (CAN)
16 Feb	Men; 1000 m ISU	1. Shani Davis (USA) 1:10.58	4. Remco olde Heuvel (NED); 5. Lars Elgersma (NED); 6. Mark Tuitert (NED); 7. Jeremy Wotherspoon (CAN); 8. Simon Kuipers (NED); 9. Dmitry Lobkov (RUS), 10. Mika Poutala (FIN); B 1. Christoffer Fagerli Rukke (NOR)
16 Feb	Men; 1000 m ISU	2. Denny Morrison (CAN) 1:11.03	4. Remco olde Heuvel (NED); 5. Lars Elgersma (NED); 6. Mark Tuitert (NED); 7. Jeremy Wotherspoon (CAN); 8. Simon Kuipers (NED); 9. Dmitry Lobkov (RUS), 10. Mika Poutala (FIN); B 1. Christoffer Fagerli Rukke (NOR)
16 Feb	Men; 1000 m ISU	3. Jan Bos (NED) 1:11.26	4. Remco olde Heuvel (NED); 5. Lars Elgersma (NED); 6. Mark Tuitert (NED); 7. Jeremy Wotherspoon (CAN); 8. Simon Kuipers (NED); 9. Dmitry Lobkov (RUS), 10. Mika Poutala (FIN); B 1. Christoffer Fagerli Rukke (NOR)
17 Feb	Women; 100 m ISU	1. Jenny Wolf (GER) 10.44	4. Kim Weger (CAN); 5. Svetlana Kaykan (RUS); 6. Yekaterina Malysheva (RUS); 7. Anna Badayeva (BLR); 8. Gabriele Hirschbichler (GER); 9. Danielle Wotherspoon (CAN); 10. Annette Gerritsen (NED)
17 Feb	Women; 100 m ISU	2. Judith Hesse (GER)10.50	4. Kim Weger (CAN); 5. Svetlana Kaykan (RUS); 6. Yekaterina Malysheva (RUS); 7. Anna Badayeva (BLR); 8. Gabriele Hirschbichler (GER); 9. Danielle Wotherspoon (CAN); 10. Annette Gerritsen (NED)
17 Feb	Women; 100 m ISU	3. Shihomi Shinya (JPN) 10.56	4. Kim Weger (CAN); 5. Svetlana Kaykan (RUS); 6. Yekaterina Malysheva (RUS); 7. Anna Badayeva (BLR); 8. Gabriele Hirschbichler (GER); 9. Danielle Wotherspoon (CAN); 10. Annette Gerritsen (NED)
17 Feb	Men; 100 m ISU	1. Mark Nielsen (CAN) 9.55	4. Joji Kato (JPN); 5. Vincent Labrie (CAN) and Maciej Ustynowicz (POL); 7. Akio Ohta (JPN); 8. Tadashi Obara (JPN); 9. Tucker Fredricks (USA); 10. Keiichiro Nagashima (JPN)
17 Feb	Men; 100 m ISU	2. Mika Poutala (FIN) 9.69	4. Joji Kato (JPN); 5. Vincent Labrie (CAN) and Maciej Ustynowicz (POL); 7. Akio Ohta (JPN); 8. Tadashi Obara (JPN); 9. Tucker Fredricks (USA); 10. Keiichiro Nagashima (JPN)
17 Feb	Men; 100 m ISU	3. Dag Erik Kleven (NOR) 9.78	4. Joji Kato (JPN); 5. Vincent Labrie (CAN) and Maciej Ustynowicz (POL); 7. Akio Ohta (JPN); 8. Tadashi Obara (JPN); 9. Tucker Fredricks (USA); 10. Keiichiro Nagashima (JPN)
17 Feb	Women; 500 m ISU	1. Jenny Wolf (GER) 38.51	4. Shannon Rempel (CAN); 5. Marianne Timmer (NED); 6. Sayuri Yoshii (JPN); 7. Nao Kodaira (JPN); 8. Yuliya Nemaya (RUS); 9. Pamela Zöllner (GER) and Yukari Watanabe (JPN); B 1. Kerry Simpson (CAN)
17 Feb	Women; 500 m ISU	2. Annette Gerritsen (NED) 39.13	4. Shannon Rempel (CAN); 5. Marianne Timmer (NED); 6. Sayuri Yoshii (JPN); 7. Nao Kodaira (JPN); 8. Yuliya Nemaya (RUS); 9. Pamela Zöllner (GER) and Yukari Watanabe (JPN); B 1. Kerry Simpson (CAN)
17 Feb	Women; 500 m ISU	3. Svetlana Kaykan (RUS) 39.31	4. Shannon Rempel (CAN); 5. Marianne Timmer (NED); 6. Sayuri Yoshii (JPN); 7. Nao Kodaira (JPN); 8. Yuliya Nemaya (RUS); 9. Pamela Zöllner (GER) and Yukari Watanabe (JPN); B 1. Kerry Simpson (CAN)
17 Feb	Men; 500 m ISU	1. Jeremy Wotherspoon (CAN) 35.35	4. Joji Kato (JPN) and Denny Morrison (CAN); 6. Lars Elgersma (NED); 7. Simon Kuipers (NED), Mika Poutala (FIN) and Tucker Fredricks (USA); 10. Jan Smeekens (NED); B 1. Hiroyasu Shimizu (JPN)
17 Feb	Men; 500 m ISU	2. Keiichiro Nagashima (JPN) 35.70; Mike Ireland (CAN) 35.70	4. Joji Kato (JPN) and Denny Morrison (CAN); 6. Lars Elgersma (NED); 7. Simon Kuipers (NED), Mika Poutala (FIN) and Tucker Fredricks (USA); 10. Jan Smeekens (NED); B 1. Hiroyasu Shimizu (JPN)
17 Feb	Women; 1000 m ISU	1. Anni Friesinger (GER) 1:16.45	4. Annette Gerritsen (NED); 5. Sayuri Yoshii (JPN); 6. Brittany Schussler (CAN); 7. Elli Ochowicz (USA); 8. Pamela Zöllner (GER); 9. Marianne Timmer (NED); 10. Monique Angermüller (GER); B 1. Kerry Simpson (CAN)
17 Feb	Women; 1000 m ISU	2. Ireen Wüst (NED) 1:17.95	4. Annette Gerritsen (NED); 5. Sayuri Yoshii (JPN); 6. Brittany Schussler (CAN); 7. Elli Ochowicz (USA); 8. Pamela Zöllner (GER); 9. Marianne Timmer (NED); 10. Monique Angermüller (GER); B 1. Kerry Simpson (CAN)
17 Feb	Women; 1000 m ISU	3. Shannon Rempel (CAN) 1:18.41	4. Annette Gerritsen (NED); 5. Sayuri Yoshii (JPN); 6. Brittany Schussler (CAN); 7. Elli Ochowicz (USA); 8. Pamela Zöllner (GER); 9. Marianne Timmer (NED); 10. Monique Angermüller (GER); B 1. Kerry Simpson (CAN)
17 Feb	Men; 1000 m ISU	1. Shani Davis (USA) 1:09.65	4. Jeremy Wotherspoon (CAN); 5. Mark Tuitert (NED); 6. Samuel Schwarz (GER); 7. Lars Elgersma (NED); 8. Remco olde Heuvel (NED); 9. Kip Carpenter (USA); 10. Aleksey Yesin (RUS); B 1. Tadashi Obara (JPN)
17 Feb	Men; 1000 m ISU	2. Denny Morrison (CAN) 1:09.86	4. Jeremy Wotherspoon (CAN); 5. Mark Tuitert (NED); 6. Samuel Schwarz (GER); 7. Lars Elgersma (NED); 8. Remco olde Heuvel (NED); 9. Kip Carpenter (USA); 10. Aleksey Yesin (RUS); B 1. Tadashi Obara (JPN)
17 Feb	Men; 1000 m ISU	3. Jan Bos (NED) 1:09.94	4. Jeremy Wotherspoon (CAN); 5. Mark Tuitert (NED); 6. Samuel Schwarz (GER); 7. Lars Elgersma (NED); 8. Remco olde Heuvel (NED); 9. Kip Carpenter (USA); 10. Aleksey Yesin (RUS); B 1. Tadashi Obara (JPN)

=== WC 9, Heerenveen, Netherlands, 22–24 February ===
==== Race results ====
Date	Event	Podium	Top 10
22 Feb	Women; 500 m ISU	1. Jenny Wolf (GER) 37.89	5. Svetlana Kaykan (RUS); 6. Sayuri Yoshii (JPN); 7. Yuliya Nemaya (RUS); 8. Zhang Shuang (CHN); 9. Judith Hesse (GER); 10. Pamela Zöllner (GER)
22 Feb	Women; 500 m ISU	2. Lee Sang-hwa (KOR) 38.38	5. Svetlana Kaykan (RUS); 6. Sayuri Yoshii (JPN); 7. Yuliya Nemaya (RUS); 8. Zhang Shuang (CHN); 9. Judith Hesse (GER); 10. Pamela Zöllner (GER)
22 Feb	Women; 500 m ISU	3. Marianne Timmer (NED) 38.52; Annette Gerritsen (NED) 38.52	5. Svetlana Kaykan (RUS); 6. Sayuri Yoshii (JPN); 7. Yuliya Nemaya (RUS); 8. Zhang Shuang (CHN); 9. Judith Hesse (GER); 10. Pamela Zöllner (GER)
22 Feb	Men; 500 m ISU	1. Jeremy Wotherspoon (CAN) 34.82	4. Mun Jun (KOR); 5. Mika Poutala (FIN); 6. Lee Kang-seok (KOR); 7. Mike Ireland (CAN); 8. Keiichiro Nagashima (JPN) and Dmitry Lobkov (RUS); 10. Jan Smeekens (NED)
22 Feb	Men; 500 m ISU	2. Joji Kato (JPN) 34.84	4. Mun Jun (KOR); 5. Mika Poutala (FIN); 6. Lee Kang-seok (KOR); 7. Mike Ireland (CAN); 8. Keiichiro Nagashima (JPN) and Dmitry Lobkov (RUS); 10. Jan Smeekens (NED)
22 Feb	Men; 500 m ISU	3. Lee Kyou-hyuk (KOR) 34.99	4. Mun Jun (KOR); 5. Mika Poutala (FIN); 6. Lee Kang-seok (KOR); 7. Mike Ireland (CAN); 8. Keiichiro Nagashima (JPN) and Dmitry Lobkov (RUS); 10. Jan Smeekens (NED)
22 Feb	Women; 3000 m ISU	1. Martina Sáblíková (CZE) 4:03.75	4. Claudia Pechstein (GER); 5. Paulien van Deutekom (NED); 6. Daniela Anschütz-Thoms (GER); 7. Kristina Groves (CAN); 8. Catherine Raney (USA); 9. Jorien Voorhuis (NED); 10. Katrin Mattscherodt (GER);
22 Feb	Women; 3000 m ISU	2. Ireen Wüst (NED) 4:04.24	4. Claudia Pechstein (GER); 5. Paulien van Deutekom (NED); 6. Daniela Anschütz-Thoms (GER); 7. Kristina Groves (CAN); 8. Catherine Raney (USA); 9. Jorien Voorhuis (NED); 10. Katrin Mattscherodt (GER);
22 Feb	Women; 3000 m ISU	3. Renate Groenewold (NED) 4:04.98	4. Claudia Pechstein (GER); 5. Paulien van Deutekom (NED); 6. Daniela Anschütz-Thoms (GER); 7. Kristina Groves (CAN); 8. Catherine Raney (USA); 9. Jorien Voorhuis (NED); 10. Katrin Mattscherodt (GER);
22 Feb	Men; 1500 m ISU	1. Shani Davis (USA) 1:45.25	4. Sven Kramer (NED); 5. Mark Tuitert (NED); 6. Yevgeny Lalenkov (RUS); 7. Beorn Nijenhuis (NED); 8. Ivan Skobrev (RUS); 9. Simon Kuipers (NED); 10. Erben Wennemars (NED)
22 Feb	Men; 1500 m ISU	2. Denny Morrison (CAN) 1:45.51	4. Sven Kramer (NED); 5. Mark Tuitert (NED); 6. Yevgeny Lalenkov (RUS); 7. Beorn Nijenhuis (NED); 8. Ivan Skobrev (RUS); 9. Simon Kuipers (NED); 10. Erben Wennemars (NED)
22 Feb	Men; 1500 m ISU	3. Enrico Fabris (ITA) 1:45.53	4. Sven Kramer (NED); 5. Mark Tuitert (NED); 6. Yevgeny Lalenkov (RUS); 7. Beorn Nijenhuis (NED); 8. Ivan Skobrev (RUS); 9. Simon Kuipers (NED); 10. Erben Wennemars (NED)
23 Feb	Women; 500 m ISU	1. Jenny Wolf (GER) 38.32	4. Sayuri Yoshii (JPN); 5. Annette Gerritsen (NED); 6. Shannon Rempel (CAN); 7. Elli Ochowicz (USA); 8. Judith Hesse (GER); 9. Sayuri Osuga (JPN); 10. Nao Kodaira (JPN)
23 Feb	Women; 500 m ISU	2. Lee Sang-hwa (KOR) 38.70	4. Sayuri Yoshii (JPN); 5. Annette Gerritsen (NED); 6. Shannon Rempel (CAN); 7. Elli Ochowicz (USA); 8. Judith Hesse (GER); 9. Sayuri Osuga (JPN); 10. Nao Kodaira (JPN)
23 Feb	Women; 500 m ISU	3. Svetlana Kaykan (RUS) 38.82	4. Sayuri Yoshii (JPN); 5. Annette Gerritsen (NED); 6. Shannon Rempel (CAN); 7. Elli Ochowicz (USA); 8. Judith Hesse (GER); 9. Sayuri Osuga (JPN); 10. Nao Kodaira (JPN)
23 Feb	Men; 500 m ISU	1. Jeremy Wotherspoon (CAN) 34.92	4. Mika Poutala (FIN); 5. Lee Kyou-hyuk (KOR); 6. Mun Jun (KOR); 7. Lee Ki-ho (KOR); 8. Jan Smeekens (NED) and Mike Ireland (CAN); 10. Jacques de Koning (NED)
23 Feb	Men; 500 m ISU	2. Joji Kato (JPN) 35.07	4. Mika Poutala (FIN); 5. Lee Kyou-hyuk (KOR); 6. Mun Jun (KOR); 7. Lee Ki-ho (KOR); 8. Jan Smeekens (NED) and Mike Ireland (CAN); 10. Jacques de Koning (NED)
23 Feb	Men; 500 m ISU	3. Dmitry Lobkov (RUS) 35.12	4. Mika Poutala (FIN); 5. Lee Kyou-hyuk (KOR); 6. Mun Jun (KOR); 7. Lee Ki-ho (KOR); 8. Jan Smeekens (NED) and Mike Ireland (CAN); 10. Jacques de Koning (NED)
23 Feb	Women; 1500 m ISU	1. Paulien van Deutekom (NED) 1:56.61	4. Jorien Voorhuis (NED); 5. Diane Valkenburg (NED); 6. Daniela Anschütz-Thoms (GER); 7. Claudia Pechstein (GER); 8. Maki Tabata (JPN); 9. Martina Sáblíková (CZE); 10. Katarzyna Wójcicka (POL)
23 Feb	Women; 1500 m ISU	2. Ireen Wüst (NED) 1:57.04	4. Jorien Voorhuis (NED); 5. Diane Valkenburg (NED); 6. Daniela Anschütz-Thoms (GER); 7. Claudia Pechstein (GER); 8. Maki Tabata (JPN); 9. Martina Sáblíková (CZE); 10. Katarzyna Wójcicka (POL)
23 Feb	Women; 1500 m ISU	3. Kristina Groves (CAN) 1:57.63	4. Jorien Voorhuis (NED); 5. Diane Valkenburg (NED); 6. Daniela Anschütz-Thoms (GER); 7. Claudia Pechstein (GER); 8. Maki Tabata (JPN); 9. Martina Sáblíková (CZE); 10. Katarzyna Wójcicka (POL)
23 Feb	Men; 5000 m ISU	1. Sven Kramer (NED) 6:15.10	4. Carl Verheijen (NED); 5. Arne Dankers (CAN); 6. Håvard Bøkko (NOR); 7. Øystein Grødum (NOR); 8. Tom Prinsen (NED); 9. Chad Hedrick (USA)' 10. Ivan Skobrev (RUS)
23 Feb	Men; 5000 m ISU	2. Enrico Fabris (ITA) 6:18.56	4. Carl Verheijen (NED); 5. Arne Dankers (CAN); 6. Håvard Bøkko (NOR); 7. Øystein Grødum (NOR); 8. Tom Prinsen (NED); 9. Chad Hedrick (USA)' 10. Ivan Skobrev (RUS)
23 Feb	Men; 5000 m ISU	3. Wouter olde Heuvel (NED) 6:20.21	4. Carl Verheijen (NED); 5. Arne Dankers (CAN); 6. Håvard Bøkko (NOR); 7. Øystein Grødum (NOR); 8. Tom Prinsen (NED); 9. Chad Hedrick (USA)' 10. Ivan Skobrev (RUS)
24 Feb	Women; 1000 m ISU	1. Anni Friesinger (GER) 1:15.57	4. Ireen Wüst (NED); 5. Kristina Groves (CAN); 6. Wang Fei (CHN); 7. Annette Gerritsen (NED); 8. Marianne Timmer (NED); 9. Brittany Schussler (CAN); 10. Sayuri Yoshii (JPN)
24 Feb	Women; 1000 m ISU	2. Paulien van Deutekom (NED) 1:16.77	4. Ireen Wüst (NED); 5. Kristina Groves (CAN); 6. Wang Fei (CHN); 7. Annette Gerritsen (NED); 8. Marianne Timmer (NED); 9. Brittany Schussler (CAN); 10. Sayuri Yoshii (JPN)
24 Feb	Women; 1000 m ISU	3. Shannon Rempel (CAN) 1:16.82	4. Ireen Wüst (NED); 5. Kristina Groves (CAN); 6. Wang Fei (CHN); 7. Annette Gerritsen (NED); 8. Marianne Timmer (NED); 9. Brittany Schussler (CAN); 10. Sayuri Yoshii (JPN)
24 Feb	Men; 1000 m ISU	1. Shani Davis (USA) 1:08.63	4. Yevgeny Lalenkov (RUS); 5. Lee Kyou-hyuk (KOR); 6. Jan Bos (NED); 7. Mark Tuitert (NED); 8. Jeremy Wotherspoon (CAN); 9. Mun Jun (KOR); 10. Mika Poutala (FIN)
24 Feb	Men; 1000 m ISU	2. Denny Morrison (CAN) 1:08.75	4. Yevgeny Lalenkov (RUS); 5. Lee Kyou-hyuk (KOR); 6. Jan Bos (NED); 7. Mark Tuitert (NED); 8. Jeremy Wotherspoon (CAN); 9. Mun Jun (KOR); 10. Mika Poutala (FIN)
24 Feb	Men; 1000 m ISU	3. Simon Kuipers (NED) 1:09.22	4. Yevgeny Lalenkov (RUS); 5. Lee Kyou-hyuk (KOR); 6. Jan Bos (NED); 7. Mark Tuitert (NED); 8. Jeremy Wotherspoon (CAN); 9. Mun Jun (KOR); 10. Mika Poutala (FIN)
24 Feb	Women; 100 m ISU	1. Jenny Wolf (GER) 10.37	4. Svetlana Kaykan (RUS); 5. Lee Sang-hwa (KOR); 6. Kerry Simpson (CAN); 7. Oudenaarden (CAN); 8. Pamela Zoellner (GER)
24 Feb	Women; 100 m ISU	2. Judith Hesse (GER) 10.55	4. Svetlana Kaykan (RUS); 5. Lee Sang-hwa (KOR); 6. Kerry Simpson (CAN); 7. Oudenaarden (CAN); 8. Pamela Zoellner (GER)
24 Feb	Women; 100 m ISU	3. Shihomi Shinya (JPN) 10.58	4. Svetlana Kaykan (RUS); 5. Lee Sang-hwa (KOR); 6. Kerry Simpson (CAN); 7. Oudenaarden (CAN); 8. Pamela Zoellner (GER)
24 Feb	Men; 100 m ISU	1. Joji Kato (JPN) 9.75	4. Mika Poutala (FIN); 5. Jan Smeekens (NED); 6. Vincent Labrie (CAN); 7. Dag-Erik Kleven (NOR); 8. Tadashi Obara (JPN); 9. Lee Ki-ho (KOR)
24 Feb	Men; 100 m ISU	2. Lee Kang-seok (KOR) 9.72	4. Mika Poutala (FIN); 5. Jan Smeekens (NED); 6. Vincent Labrie (CAN); 7. Dag-Erik Kleven (NOR); 8. Tadashi Obara (JPN); 9. Lee Ki-ho (KOR)
24 Feb	Men; 100 m ISU	3. Maciej Ustynowicz (POL) 9.81	4. Mika Poutala (FIN); 5. Jan Smeekens (NED); 6. Vincent Labrie (CAN); 7. Dag-Erik Kleven (NOR); 8. Tadashi Obara (JPN); 9. Lee Ki-ho (KOR)
24 Feb	Women; Team pursuit ISU	1. Canada (Groves, Rempel, Schussler) 3:02.69	4. Russia
24 Feb	Women; Team pursuit ISU	2. Germany (Anschütz-Thoms, Mattscherodt, Opitz) 3:02.80	4. Russia
24 Feb	Women; Team pursuit ISU	3. Japan (Hozumi, Otsu, Shinya ) 3:03.15	4. Russia
24 Feb	Men; Team pursuit ISU	1. Netherlands (Kramer, W. olde Heuvel, Verheijen,) 3:40.20	4. Norway
24 Feb	Men; Team pursuit ISU	2. Canada (Dankers, Morrison, Warsylewicz) 3:44.97	4. Norway
24 Feb	Men; Team pursuit ISU	3. Russia (Lalenkov, Skobrev, Yesin) 3:46.75	4. Norway

== Men's overall results ==
=== 100 m ===
Pos.	Skater	Erf	Inz	Hee	Points
1.	Lee Kang-seok (KOR)	100		120	220
2.	Mika Poutala (FIN)	50	80	90	220
3.	Joji Kato (JPN)		60	150	210
4.	Maciej Ustynowicz (POL)	45	50	105	200
5.	Jan Smeekens (NED)	60	20	75	155
6.	Vincent Labrie (CAN)	40	50	45	135
7.	Dag-Erik Kleven (NOR)		70	40	110
8.	Mark Nielsen (CAN)		100		100
9.	Yu Fengtong (CHN)	80			80
10.	Tadashi Obara (JPN)		36	36	72
11.	Zhang Zhongqi (CHN)	70			70
12.	Tucker Fredricks (USA)	28	32		60
13.	Mike Ireland (CAN)	22	26		48
14.	Dmitry Lobkov (RUS)	24	24		48
15.	Akio Ohta (JPN)		40		40

Source: SpeedSkatingStats.com

=== 500 m ===
Pos.	Skater	SLC 1	SLC 2	Cal 1	Cal 2	Hee 1	Hee 2	Erf 1	Erf 2	Ham 1	Ham 2	Inz 1	Inz 2	Hee 3	Hee 4	Points
1.	Jeremy Wotherspoon (CAN)	100	100	100	100					100	100	80	100	150	150	1080
2.	Lee Kang-seok (KOR)	80	80	60	60	50	100	100	100	32	50			45	18	775
3.	Dmitry Lobkov (RUS)	60	40	80	50	36	40	80	28	50	36	60	24	36	105	725
4.	Lee Kyou-hyuk (KOR)	70	60	50	40	80	50	70	45	45	24			105	75	714
5.	Mika Poutala (FIN)	28	45	36	70	28	60	50	32	40	70	50	40	75	90	714
6.	Mun Jun (KOR)	45	32	70	21	70	70	12	80	60	80			90	45	675
7.	Joji Kato (JPN)	1			25	45	80			14	21	100	60	120	120	586
8.	Tucker Fredricks (USA)	26	36	36	80	100	45	60	18	16	28	40	40	18	24	567
9.	Keiichiro Nagashima (JPN)	36	28	45	18	60	36			80	45	70	80	36	6	540
10.	Lee Ki-ho (KOR)	20	20	45	14	24	36	24	45	21	60			24	40	373
11.	Jan Smeekens (NED)	8	24	24	16	21	28	18	60	24	36	14	28	28	36	365
12.	Mike Ireland (CAN)	16	26	10	45			40	24			45	80	40	36	362
13.	Simon Kuipers (NED)	13	14	14	28	25	25	28	70	36	16	18	40			327
14.	Yu Fengtong (CHN)	50	70	5	36	32	24	45	50					6		318
15.	Kip Carpenter (USA)	32	20	24	10	12	14	21	14	32	40	36	24	12	14	305

Source: SpeedSkatingStats.com

=== 1000 m ===
Pos.	Skater	SLC 1	SLC 2	Cal	Hee 1	Erf 1	Erf 2	Ham	Inz 1	Inz 2	Hee 2	Points
1.	Shani Davis (USA)	80	80	50	100	100	80		100	100	150	840
2.	Denny Morrison (CAN)		36	100	80	80	60	100	80	80	120	736
3.	Jan Bos (NED)	32	50	45	50	60	100	28	70	70	45	550
4.	Simon Kuipers (NED)	45	45	50		50	40	80	36		105	471
5.	Jeremy Wotherspoon (CAN)	70	100	80				70	40	60	36	456
6.	Lee Kyou-hyuk (KOR)	60	70	70	70	8	45	45			75	433
7.	Mun Jun (KOR)	36	60	14	45	70	70	60			32	387
8.	Mark Tuitert (NED)		28	40	40	45	12		45	50	40	300
9.	Erben Wennemars (NED)	50	32	24	70		50	40			24	290
10.	Mika Poutala (FIN)	26	14	16	36	40	21	50	28	10	28	269
11.	Remco olde Heuvel (NED)	22	26	8	18	36	14	16	60	36	14	250
12.	Kip Carpenter (USA)	24	22	18	32	24	32	24	18	32	14	240
13.	Yevgeny Lalenkov (RUS)	40	40					36			90	206
14.	Samuel Schwarz (GER)	16	13	12	12	18	21	14	24	45		175
15.	Dmitry Lobkov (RUS)	28	16	28	21	21		21	32		4	171

Source: SpeedSkatingStats.com

=== 1500 m ===
Pos.	Skater	SLC	Cal	Kol	Hee 1	Ham	Bas	Hee 2	Points
1.	Shani Davis (USA)	70	80		60		100	150	460
2.	Simon Kuipers (NED)	32	100	32	50	100	80	32	426
3.	Mark Tuitert (NED)	28	70	50	70	50	70	75	413
4.	Erben Wennemars (NED)	100	60	100	36	45	28	28	397
5.	Enrico Fabris (ITA)	50	40	80	24		60	105	359
6.	Denny Morrison (CAN)	80	6		80	70		120	356
7.	Sven Kramer (NED)	45	5		100	80		90	320
8.	Yevgeny Lalenkov (RUS)	60	50	36	28	40	50	45	309
9.	Håvard Bøkko (NOR)	40	45	70	45	60	45		305
10.	Ivan Skobrev (RUS)	18	28	60	40	28		36	210
11.	Chad Hedrick (USA)	16	18	45	32	36	40	18	205
12.	Steven Elm (CAN)	36	32	18	14	18	36		154
13.	Konrad Niedźwiedzki (POL)	26	24	28	12	32		16	138
14.	Mikael Flygind Larsen (NOR)	22	8	21	10	21	21	10	113
15.	Arne Dankers (CAN)	24	36		16			24	100

Source: SpeedSkatingStats.com

=== 5000/10 000 m ===
Pos.	Skater	SLC	Cal	Kol 10k	Hee 1	Ham 10k	Bas	Hee 2	Points
1.	Håvard Bøkko (NOR)	70	50	100	80	100		45	445
2.	Sven Kramer (NED)	80	100		100			150	430
3.	Enrico Fabris (ITA)	100	80					120	300
4.	Bob de Jong (NED)	28	60	70	50	70		6	284
5.	Wouter olde Heuvel (NED)	45	40		60			105	250
6.	Chad Hedrick (USA)	20	28	50	40	80		32	250
7.	Carl Verheijen (NED)	60	70					90	220
8.	Tom Prinsen (NED)	40	36	80	28			36	220
9.	Arne Dankers (CAN)	50	45		45			75	215
10.	Øystein Grødum (NOR)	22	16	25	21	60		40	184
11.	Justin Warsylewicz (CAN)	18	21	20	24	45		18	146
12.	Hiroki Hirako (JPN)	24	24	30	16	35		16	145
13.	Sverre Haugli (NOR)	12	15	30	18	40		21	136
14.	Odd Borgersen (NOR)	32	6	21	32	30		12	133
15.	Marco Weber (GER)			60	14	50		8	132

Source: SpeedSkatingStats.com

=== Team pursuit ===
Pos.	Nation	Skaters	Cal	Hee 1	Bas	Hee 2	Points
1.	Netherlands	Bloemen, Kramer, W. olde Heuvel, Prinsen, Tuitert, Verheijen, de Vries, Wennemars	45	100	80	150	375
2.	Canada	Dankers, Elm, Makowsky, Morrison, Warsylewicz	100	80	60	120	360
3.	Norway	Bøkko, Christiansen, Flygind Larsen, Haugli	80	60	100	90	330
4.	Russia	Lalenkov, Skobrev, Yunin, Yesin	60	70	70	105	305
5.	Germany	Dallmann, Heythausen, Lehmann, Schneider, Weber	70	50	36		156
6.	Poland	Chmura, Druszkiewicz, Kustra, Niedźwiedzki	50	40	50		140
7.	Italy	Anesi, Fabris, Stefani	28	45	45		118
8.	Sweden	Eriksson, Friberg, Röjler	40	36	40		116
9.	Japan	Dejima, Hashibami, Hirako, Michishita, Mori, Yasuda	36	32	28		96
10.	Czech Republic	Haselberger, Kulma, Sáblík	18	24	24		66

Source: SpeedSkatingStats.com

== Women's overall results ==
=== 100 m ===
Pos.	Skater	Erf	Inz	Hee	Points
1.	Jenny Wolf (GER)	100	100	150	350
2.	Judith Hesse (GER)	70	80	120	270
3.	Shihomi Shinya (JPN)		70	105	175
4.	Svetlana Kaykan (RUS)	26	50	90	166
5.	Lee Sang-hwa (KOR)	60		75	135
6.	Kim Weger (CAN)	40	60		100
7.	Xing Aihua (CHN)	80			80
8.	Pamela Zoellner (GER)	8	16	36	60
9.	Annette Gerritsen (NED)	28	28		56
10.	Kerry Simpson (CAN)		9	45	54
11.	Yekaterina Malysheva (RUS)	7	45		52
12.	Anna Badayeva (BLR)	12	40		52
13.	Zhang Shuang (CHN)	50			50
14.	Tamara Oudenaarden (NED)		6	40	46
15.	Marianne Timmer (NED)	24	22		46

Source: SpeedSkatingStats.com

=== 500 m ===
Pos.	Skater	SLC 1	SLC 2	Cal 1	Cal 2	Hee 1	Hee 2	Erf 1	Erf 2	Ham 1	Ham 2	Inz 1	Inz 2	Hee 3	Hee 4	Points
1.	Jenny Wolf (GER)	80	100	100	100	80	100	100	100	100	100	100	100	150	150	1460
2.	Annette Gerritsen (NED)	60	16	60	70	70	60	70	80	32	70	80	80	105	75	928
3.	Lee Sang-hwa (KOR)	14	28	16	40	40	70	36	70	80	80			120	120	714
4.	Svetlana Kaykan (RUS)	36	26	36	36	32	32	45	28	40	50	70	70	75	105	681
5.	Sayuri Yoshii (JPN)	70	70	70	60	18	50			36	24	70	45	45	90	648
6.	Marianne Timmer (NED)	32	60	45	50	14	18	32	24	70	60	40	50	105		600
7.	Wang Beixing (CHN)	100	80	80	80	100	80									520
8.	Shannon Rempel (CAN)	12	13	15	19	24	16	21	14	60	40	12	60	14	45	365
9.	Xing Aihua (CHN)	45	60	50	45	16	28	40	60							344
10.	Yuliya Nemaya (RUS)	20	20	8	12	36	6	18	16	28	45	16	36	40	24	325
11.	Judith Hesse (GER)	7	10	11	8	60	16	24	32			45	14	32	36	295
12.	Heike Hartmann (GER)	50	36	21	28	21	24		12	45	28	24				289
13.	Margot Boer (NED)	40	20	12	28	45	36	50	50							281
14.	Sayuri Osuga (JPN)	22	40	32	16	10	45			16	14	21	12	18	32	278
15.	Pamela Zoellner (GER)						19	19	15	50	36	36	32	28	21	256

Source: SpeedSkatingStats.com

=== 1000 m ===
Pos.	Skater	SLC 1	SLC 2	Cal	Hee 1	Erf 1	Erf 2	Ham	Inz 1	Inz 2	Hee 2	Points
1.	Anni Friesinger (GER)	80	80	100	100	100	100	100	100	100	150	1010
2.	Ireen Wüst (NED)	40	36	21	45	60	80	70	80	80	90	602
3.	Shannon Rempel (CAN)	32	32	32	40	45	45	45	70	70	105	516
4.	Chiara Simionato (ITA)	50	100	70	70	80	70					440
5.	Annette Gerritsen (NED)	45	40	45	24	50	40	40	45	60	40	429
6.	Christine Nesbitt (CAN)	60	70	80	80			80				370
7.	Cindy Klassen (CAN)	26	50	60	36	70	60	32				334
8.	Marianne Timmer (NED)		20	24	32	32	50	36	36	32	36	298
9.	Paulien van Deutekom (NED)	14		15	14			50	60		120	273
10.	Sayuri Yoshii (JPN)	24	45	40	28			18	40	50	28	273
11.	Wang Beixing (CHN)	100	60	36	70							266
12.	Kristina Groves (CAN)		28	50	50			60			75	263
13.	Brittany Schussler (CAN)	22	22	16	5	14	24	14	50	45	32	244
14.	Heike Hartmann (GER)	36	24	18	21	24	16	6	32			177
15.	Pamela Zoellner (GER)				15	28	28	28	18	36	14	167

Source: SpeedSkatingStats.com

=== 1500 m ===
Pos.	Skater	SLC	Cal	Kol	Hee 1	Ham	Bas	Hee 2	Points
1.	Kristina Groves (CAN)	80	70	60	80	60	100	105	555
2.	Christine Nesbitt (CAN)	100	100	80	70	70	70	18	508
3.	Ireen Wüst (NED)	50	18		50	100		120	338
4.	Paulien van Deutekom (NED)		40		60	80		150	330
5.	Anni Friesinger (GER)		80	100	100		32		312
6.	Daniela Anschütz-Thoms (GER)	36	60	70	32	40		45	283
7.	Claudia Pechstein (GER)	20	50	28	45	45	36	40	264
8.	Jorien Voorhuis (NED)			25		32	60	90	207
9.	Martina Sáblíková (CZE)		10	32	24	28	80	32	206
10.	Diane Valkenburg (NED)	18	16	50	28	18		75	205
11.	Cindy Klassen (CAN)	60	28	0	40	36	10		174
12.	Brittany Schussler (CAN)	28	21	21	14	16	28	24	152
13.	Shannon Rempel (CAN)	32	36		18	50		14	150
14.	Maki Tabata (JPN)	40	14	18	6	24	12	36	150
15.	Chiara Simionato (ITA)	70	45		21				136

Source: SpeedSkatingStats.com

=== 3000/5000 m ===
Pos.	Skater	SLC	Cal	Kol 5k	Hee 1	Ham 5k	Bas	Hee 2	Points
1.	Martina Sáblíková (CZE)	100	100	100	80	100	100	150	730
2.	Claudia Pechstein (GER)	60	60	60	60	80	80	90	490
3.	Renate Groenewold (NED)	70	80		100			105	355
4.	Kristina Groves (CAN)	50	70	50	50	50		40	310
5.	Daniela Anschütz-Thoms (GER)	45	45	70	40	60		45	305
6.	Clara Hughes (CAN)	40	50	80	45	70			285
7.	Ireen Wüst (NED)	32	40		70			120	262
8.	Catherine Raney (USA)	24	36	40	28	25	50	36	239
9.	Cindy Klassen (CAN)	80	24	45	18	45			212
10.	Katrin Mattscherodt (GER)	13	14	21	21	18	70	28	185
11.	Maki Tabata (JPN)	28	28	30	14	20	28	24	172
12.	Masako Hozumi (JPN)	11	15	18	10	25	60	21	160
13.	Paulien van Deutekom (NED)		18		25	40		75	158
14.	Diane Valkenburg (NED)	20	32	35	32	35			154
15.	Katarzyna Wójcicka (POL)	10	25	25	16	15	14	14	117

Source: SpeedSkatingStats.com

=== Team pursuit ===
Pos.	Nation	Skaters	Cal	Hee 1	Bas	Hee 2	Points
1.	Canada	Groves, Klassen, Nesbitt, Rempel, Schussler	80	80	40	150	350
2.	Germany	Angermüller, Anschütz-Thoms, Beckert, Friesinger, Lipp, Mattscherodt, Opitz, Pechstein	100	50	60	120	330
3.	Russia	Abramova, Kaykan, Likhachova, Lobysheva	70	70	100	90	330
4.	Japan	Hozumi, Ishizawa, Otsu, Shinya, Tabata	60	60	80	105	305
5.	Poland	Czerwonka, Ksyt, Wójcicka, Zlotkowska	45	40	70		155
6.	Netherlands	Boer, van Deutekom, Groenewold, van Riessen, Valkenburg	36	100			136
7.	United States	Lamb, Manganello, Raney, Ringsred, Swider-Pelz	40	45	50		135
8.	Romania	Anghel, Dumitru, Lazarescu, Oltean	32	36	45		113
9.	Belarus	Badayeva, Radkevich, Yasenok	28	32			60
10.	China	Gao, Ji, Xu	50				50

Source: SpeedSkatingStats.com
