= Speed skating at the 2006 Winter Olympics – Women's 500 metres =

Women's 500 metres at the XX Olympic Winter Games
- Venue: Oval Lingotto
- Dates: 14 February 2006
- Competitors: 30 from 10 nations
- Winning time: 76.57

Medalists
| 1st place, gold medalist(s) | | Svetlana Zhurova | Russia |
| 2nd place, silver medalist(s) | | Wang Manli | China |
| 3rd place, bronze medalist(s) | | Ren Hui | China |

The women's 500 m speed skating competition for the 2006 Winter Olympics was held in Turin, Italy. The competition consisted of two separate 500 metre races, with the competitors ranked by their cumulative time from the two races.

== Records ==
Prior to this competition, the existing world and Olympic records were as follows.

500 meters (1 race)

| World record | Catriona Le May Doan (CAN) | 37.22 | Calgary, Canada | 9 December 2001 |
| Olympic record | Catriona Le May Doan (CAN) | 37.30 | Salt Lake City, United States | 13 February 2002 |

500 meters x 2 (2 races)

| World record | Catriona Le May Doan (CAN) | 74.72 | Salt Lake City, United States | 9 March 2001 |
| Olympic record | Catriona Le May Doan (CAN) | 74.75 | Salt Lake City, United States | 14 February 2002 |

No new world or Olympic records were set during this competition.

== Results ==
The race was held on 14 February 2006. 34-year-old Russian Svetlana Zhurova, who left speed skating in 2003 to become a mother and completed in her fourth Olympics after returning to the sport in 2004, became the oldest woman to win a speed skating gold medal by clocking times of 38.23 and 38.34. In the last pair of the second round, she beat Chinese Wang Manli, runner-up in the first round with 38.31, by 0.13 seconds to secure the gold medal. Skaters from Asia occupied seven of the top nine places.

| Place | Athlete | Country | Race 1 | Race 2 | Total Time | Difference |
|---|---|---|---|---|---|---|
| 1st place, gold medalist(s) | Svetlana Zhurova | Russia | 38.23 (1) | 38.34 (2) | 76.57 | -- |
| 2nd place, silver medalist(s) | Wang Manli | China | 38.31 (2) | 38.47 (5) | 76.78 | +0.21 |
| 3rd place, bronze medalist(s) | Ren Hui | China | 38.60 (4) | 38.27 (1) | 76.87 | +0.30 |
| 4 | Tomomi Okazaki | Japan | 38.46 (3) | 38.46 (4) | 76.92 | +0.35 |
| 5 | Lee Sang-hwa | South Korea | 38.69 (6) | 38.35 (3) | 77.04 | +0.47 |
| 6 | Jenny Wolf | Germany | 38.70 (7) | 38.55 (6) | 77.25 | +0.68 |
| 7 | Wang Beixing | China | 38.71 (8) | 38.56 (7) | 77.27 | +0.70 |
| 8 | Sayuri Osuga | Japan | 38.74 (9) | 38.65 (8) | 77.39 | +0.82 |
| 9 | Sayuri Yoshii | Japan | 38.68 (5) | 38.75 (11) | 77.43 | +0.86 |
| 10 | Chiara Simionato | Italy | 39.02 (11) | 38.66 (9) | 77.68 | +1.11 |
| 11 | Jennifer Rodriguez | United States | 38.97 (10) | 38.73 (10) | 77.70 | +1.13 |
| 12 | Annette Gerritsen | Netherlands | 39.12 (12) | 38.97 (12) | 78.09 | +1.52 |
| 13 | Xing Aihua | China | 39.20 (13) | 39.15 (13) | 78.35 | +1.78 |
| 14 | Sanne van der Star | Netherlands | 39.26 (14) | 39.33 (15) | 78.59 | +2.02 |
| 15 | Yukari Watanabe | Japan | 39.46 (17) | 39.19 (14) | 78.65 | +2.08 |
| 16 | Shannon Rempel | Canada | 39.42 (=15) | 39.43 (19) | 78.85 | +2.28 |
| 17 | Amy Sannes | United States | 39.42 (=15) | 39.47 (20) | 78.89 | +2.32 |
| 18 | Choi Seung-yong | South Korea | 39.65 (21) | 39.37 (16) | 79.02 | +2.45 |
| 19 | Judith Hesse | Germany | 39.64 (20) | 39.39 (17) | 79.03 | +2.46 |
| 20 | Kim You-Lim | South Korea | 39.57 (18) | 39.68 (24) | 79.25 | +2.68 |
| 21 | Kerry Simpson | Canada | 39.69 (22) | 39.65 (=22) | 79.34 | +2.77 |
| 22 | Krisy Myers | Canada | 39.83 (=23) | 39.60 (21) | 79.43 | +2.86 |
| 23 | Elli Ochowicz | United States | 39.83 (=23) | 39.65 (=22) | 79.48 | +2.91 |
| 24 | Pamela Zoellner | Germany | 40.16 (27) | 39.40 (18) | 79.56 | +2.99 |
| 25 | Lee Bo-ra | South Korea | 40.01 (=25) | 39.72 (25) | 79.73 | +3.16 |
| 26 | Kim Weger | Canada | 40.01 (=25) | 39.98 (27) | 79.99 | +3.42 |
| 27 | Svetlana Radkevich | Belarus | 40.45 (29) | 39.91 (26) | 80.36 | +3.79 |
| 28 | Chris Witty | United States | 40.23 (28) | 40.46 (28) | 80.69 | +4.12 |
| 29 | Yulia Nemaya | Russia | 39.63 (19) | 72.76 (29) | 112.39 | +35.82 |
| 30 | Marianne Timmer | Netherlands | DQ | | DQ | |
