= Tadashi Obara =

Japanese speed skater (born 1983)

Personal information
- Nationality: Japanese
- Born: 15 May 1983 (age 43) Hokkaido, Japan

Sport
- Sport: Speed skating

Tadashi Obara (小原 唯志, Obara Tadashi; born 15 May 1983) is a Japanese speed skater. He competed in the men's 1000 metres event at the 2010 Winter Olympics.
