= Kerry Simpson =

Canadian speed skater

Personal information
- Born: 6 November 1981 (age 43); Melville, Saskatchewan, Canada

Sport
- Sport: Speed skating

Kerry Simpson (born 6 November 1981) is a Canadian speed skater. She competed in the women's 500 metres at the 2006 Winter Olympics, placing 21st.
