= Vincent Labrie =

Canadian speed skater

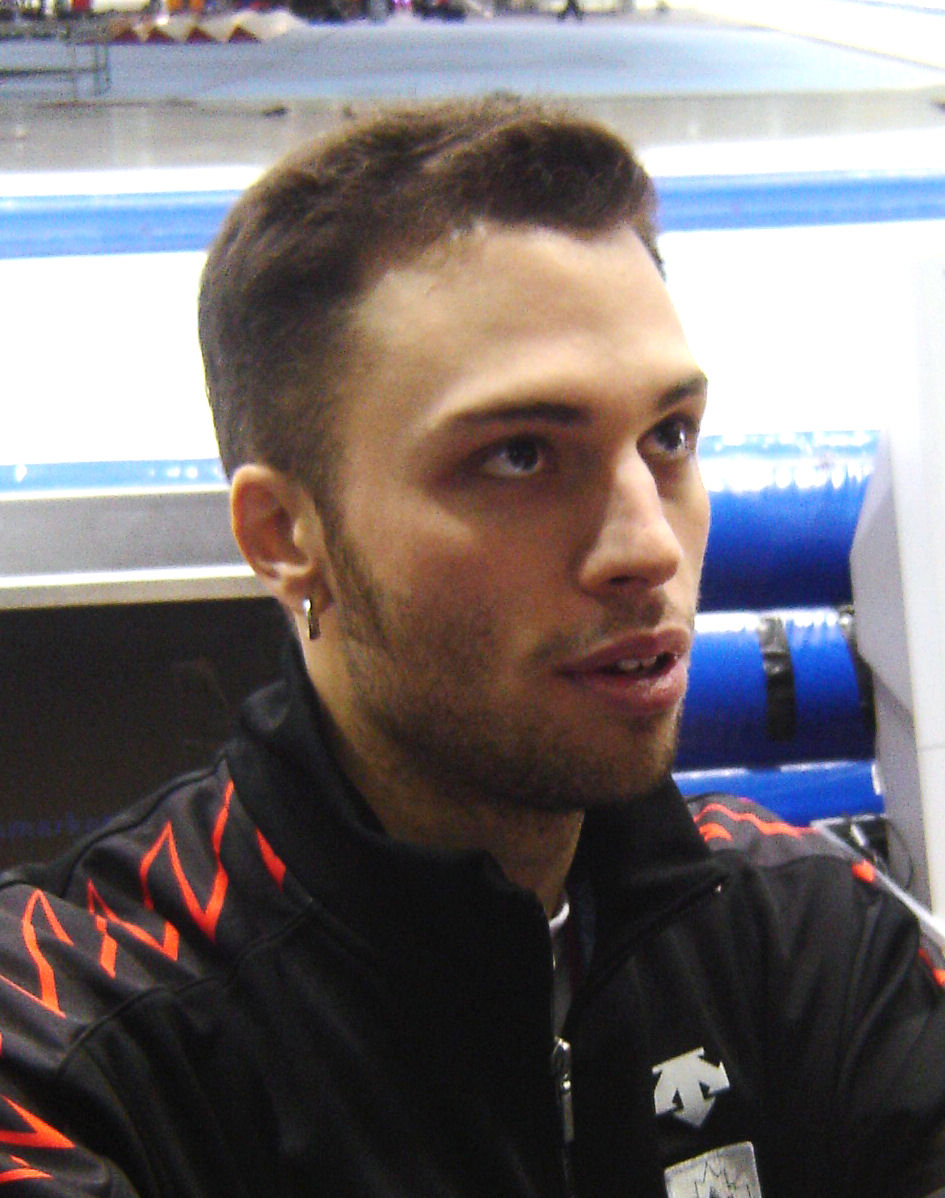
Vincent Labrie

Vincent Labrie (born February 14, 1983) is a Canadian speedskater.

Labrie was born in Lévis, Quebec, and made his Speed Skating World Cup debut in November 2005, at Salt Lake City. He has competed at two World Single Distance Championships and two World Sprint Speed Skating Championships, with his best finish a 15th in the 500 metres at the 2008 Single Distance Championships.

Labrie competed at the 2006 Winter Olympics, in the 500 metres. He placed 29th in each of the two races, leaving him 29th overall.

== World Cup Personal Bests ==
Event	Time	Date	Location
500 metres	34.71	November 16, 2007	Calgary
1000 metres	1:09.25	November 2005	Salt Lake City
