= Lee Ki-ho (speed skater) =

South Korean speed skater

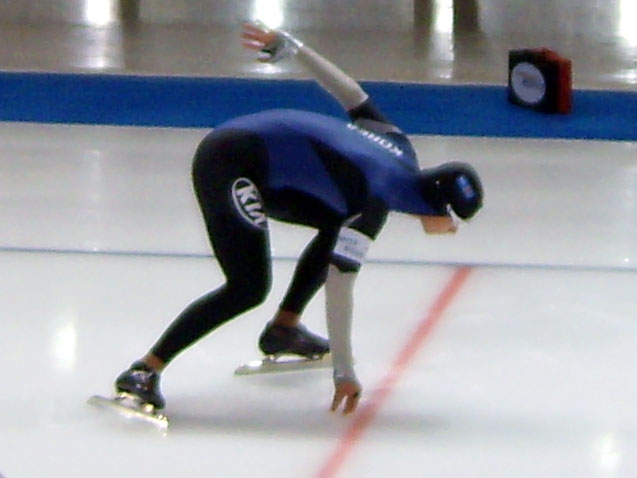
- Lee Ki-ho before 1000 meters world cup speedskating race in Berlin.

Personal information
- Born: 17 August 1984 (age 41) South Korea
- Height: 1.82 m (5 ft 11 1/2 in)
- Weight: 74 kg (163 lb; 11.7 st)

Sport
- Country: South Korea
- Sport: Speed skating
Medal record
Men's speed skating
Representing South Korea
Winter Universiade
Silver medal – second place	2007 Torino	500 m

Lee Ki-ho (Korean: 이기호, born 17 August 1984) is a South Korean speed skater. He competed for South Korea at the 2010 Winter Olympics in Vancouver, British Columbia, Canada.

== Personal records ==
- 500m – 34.59 (16 November 2007, Calgary)
- 1000m – 1:08.36 (18 November 2007, Calgary)
- 1500m – 1:59.09 (28 December 2002, Seoul)
