= Kim Weger =

Canadian speed skater

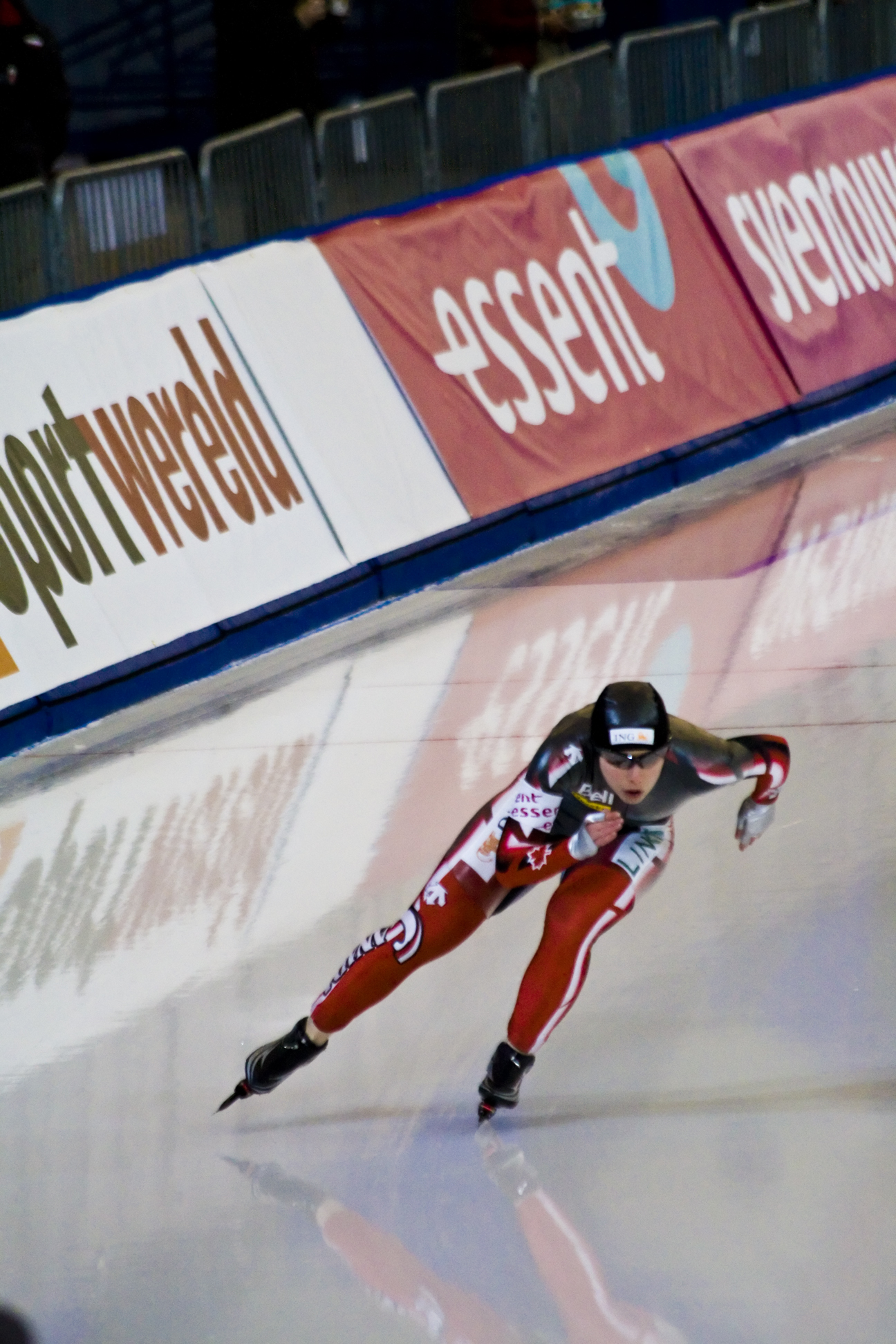
- Kim Weger in 2009

Personal information
- Born: 8 April 1980 (age 44); Regina, Saskatchewan, Canada

Sport
- Sport: Speed skating

Kim Weger (born 8 April 1980) is a Canadian speed skater. She competed in the women's 500 metres at the 2006 Winter Olympics.
