= Pamela Zöllner =

German speed skater

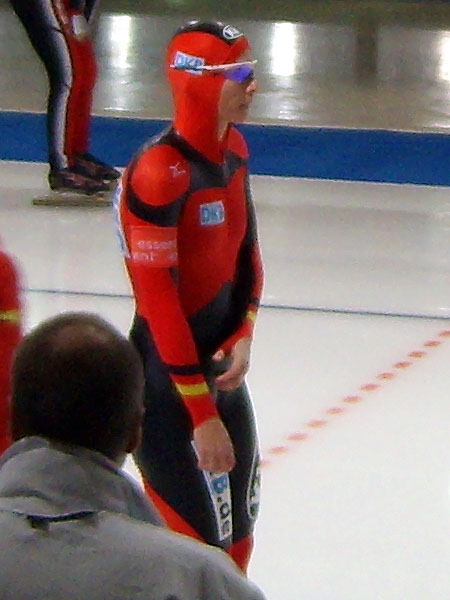
- Pamela Zoellner in 2008

Personal information
- Nationality: German
- Born: 15 January 1977 (age 48); Berlin, West Germany

Sport
- Sport: Speed skating

Pamela Zöllner (born 15 January 1977) is a German speed skater. She competed in two events at the 2006 Winter Olympics.
