= 2008–09 ISU Speed Skating World Cup – Men's 1000 metres =

The 1000 metres distance for men in the 2008–09 ISU Speed Skating World Cup was contested over 10 races on seven occasions, out of a total of nine World Cup occasions for the season, with the first occasion taking place in Berlin, Germany, on 7–9 November 2008, and the final occasion taking place in Salt Lake City, United States, on 6–7 March 2009.

Shani Davis of the United States defended his title from the previous season, while Denny Morrison of Canada repeated his second place, and Stefan Groothuis of the Netherlands came third.

On the last competition weekend of the season, Davis set a new world record of 1:06.42.

== Top three ==
Medal	Athlete	Points	Previous season
Gold	(United States) Shani Davis	840	1st
Silver	(Canada) Denny Morrison	705	2nd
Bronze	(Netherlands) Stefan Groothuis	590	–

== Race medallists ==
Occasion #	Location	Date	Gold	Time	Silver	Time	Bronze	Time	Report
1	Berlin, Germany	9 November	Stefan Groothuis; Netherlands	1:09.13	Shani Davis; United States	1:09.15	Simon Kuipers; Netherlands	1:09.30	
2	Heerenveen, Netherlands	16 November	Shani Davis; United States	1:08.99	Pekka Koskela; Finland	1:09.05	Simon Kuipers; Netherlands	1:09.26	
4	Changchun, China	6 December	Lee Kyou-hyuk; South Korea	1:09.68	Stefan Groothuis; Netherlands	1:10.15	Shani Davis; United States	1:10.32	
4	Changchun, China	7 December	Simon Kuipers; Netherlands	1:09.83	Shani Davis; United States	1:09.99	Stefan Groothuis; Netherlands	1:10.01	
5	Nagano, Japan	13 December	Shani Davis; United States	1:09.21	Denny Morrison; Canada	1:09.40	Lee Kyou-hyuk; South Korea	1:09.43	
5	Nagano, Japan	14 December	Shani Davis; United States	1:08.92	Lee Kyou-hyuk; South Korea	1:09.16	Denny Morrison; Canada	1:09.23	
6	Kolomna, Russia	24 January	Denny Morrison; Canada	1:08.71	Stefan Groothuis; Netherlands	1:08.97	Yevgeny Lalenkov; Russia	1:09.02	
6	Kolomna, Russia	25 January	Denny Morrison; Canada	1:08.53	Stefan Groothuis; Netherlands	1:08.67	Mark Tuitert; Netherlands	1:09.09	
7	Erfurt, Germany	1 February	Shani Davis; United States	1:08.40	Denny Morrison; Canada	1:08.78	Jan Bos; Netherlands	1:09.03	
9	Salt Lake City, United States	7 March	Shani Davis; United States	1:06.42; WR	Trevor Marsicano; United States	1:06.88	Denny Morrison; Canada	1:07.11	

== Final standings ==
Standings as of 8 March 2009 (end of the season).

#	Name	Nat.	BER	HVN	CHA1	CHA2	NAG1	NAG 2	KOL1	KOL2	ERF	SLC	Total
1	Shani Davis	(United States)	80	100	70	80	100	100	–	60	100	150	840
2	Denny Morrison	(Canada)	45	40	45	40	80	70	100	100	80	105	705
3	Stefan Groothuis	(Netherlands)	100	45	80	70	–	–	80	80	45	90	590
4	Simon Kuipers	(Netherlands)	70	70	40	100	–	–	36	50	50	18	434
5	Lee Kyou-hyuk	(South Korea)	14	18	100	60	70	80	–	–	–	28	370
6	Keiichiro Nagashima	(Japan)	40	50	16	–	60	36	60	–	8	45	315
7	Mark Tuitert	(Netherlands)	32	24	60	50	–	–	28	70	10	12	286
8	Yevgeny Lalenkov	(Russia)	60	10	–	–	–	–	70	45	–	75	260
9	Lee Jong-woo	(South Korea)	25	14	50	28	36	60	–	–	–	32	245
10	Mo Tae-bum	(South Korea)	21	36	36	45	40	50	–	–	–	16	244
11	Trevor Marsicano	(United States)	15	32	–	–	–	–	–	–	60	120	227
12	Jan Bos	(Netherlands)	10	25	–	–	–	–	45	36	70	36	222
13	Tadashi Obara	(Japan)	0	0	11	19	32	32	50	40	24	5	213
14	François-Olivier Roberge	(Canada)	8	19	32	36	50	8	14	21	16	8	212
15	Mika Poutala	(Finland)	18	28	8	24	21	28	32	32	–	21	212
16	Pekka Koskela	(Finland)	50	80	–	–	24	45	–	–	–	–	199
17	Samuel Schwarz	(Germany)	16	16	12	18	16	24	0	28	36	24	190
18	Sjoerd de Vries	(Netherlands)	–	–	25	25	28	10	24	24	14	14	164
19	Kyle Parrott	(Canada)	–	–	15	11	6	18	40	18	40	6	154
20	Nick Pearson	(United States)	12	12	–	–	19	25	21	12	32	10	143
21	Aleksandr Lebedev	(Russia)	2	0	24	12	12	21	18	16	18	4	127
22	Remco olde Heuvel	(Netherlands)	–	–	19	15	45	40	–	–	–	–	119
23	Frank Steiner	(Germany)	0	1	18	14	18	16	12	8	28	2	117
24	Dmitry Lobkov	(Russia)	28	8	28	32	5	–	8	–	–	3	112
25	Erben Wennemars	(Netherlands)	36	60	–	–	–	–	–	–	–	–	96
26	Christopher Needham	(United States)	–	–	–	–	25	19	16	14	12	–	86
27	Muncef Ouardi	(Canada)	3	6	10	16	14	14	10	10	–	–	83
28	Jamie Gregg	(Canada)	–	–	–	–	–	–	–	–	25	40	65
29	Ermanno Ioriatti	(Italy)	–	–	–	–	–	25	19	21	–	–	65
30	Philippe Riopel	(Canada)	2	10	14	10	10	12	–	–	–	–	56
31	Tuomas Nieminen	(Finland)	0	0	0	2	8	8	11	15	5	–	49
32	Lee Ki-ho	(South Korea)	4	0	21	0	6	15	–	–	–	–	46
33	Håvard Bøkko	(Norway)	24	21	–	–	–	–	–	–	–	–	45
34	Aleksey Yesin	(Russia)	4	0	–	–	–	–	8	25	6	–	43
35	Mun Jun	(South Korea)	–	–	6	21	8	6	–	–	–	–	41
36	Nico Ihle	(Germany)	0	–	8	–	15	11	–	–	0	–	34
37	Timofey Skopin	(Russia)	0	0	6	0	11	–	4	11	–	–	32
38	Yu Fengtong	(China)	11	6	5	8	–	–	–	–	–	–	30
39	Brent Aussprung	(United States)	0	–	–	–	0	4	19	6	–	–	29
40	Christoffer Fagerli Rukke	(Norway)	6	11	–	–	–	–	–	–	11	–	28
41	Mikael Flygind-Larsen	(Norway)	19	5	–	–	–	–	–	–	–	–	24
42	Sergey Chadayev	(Russia)	–	–	2	8	4	–	–	8	0	–	22
43	Steven Elm	(Canada)	–	–	–	–	–	–	–	–	19	–	19
44	Takaharu Nakajima	(Japan)	–	–	–	–	–	–	15	0	4	–	19
45	Jan Friesinger	(Germany)	–	–	–	–	–	–	–	–	15	–	15
45	Chad Hedrick	(United States)	–	15	–	–	–	–	–	–	–	–	15
47	Joel Eriksson	(Sweden)	1	4	–	–	–	–	–	–	8	–	13
48	Yuya Oikawa	(Japan)	–	–	–	–	–	–	6	–	6	–	12
49	Zhang Yaolin	(China)	–	–	1	1	2	6	0	1	0	–	11
50	Konrad Niedźwiedzki	(Poland)	8	2	–	–	–	–	–	–	–	–	10
51	Zhang Zhongqi	(China)	–	–	0	6	–	–	2	0	–	–	8
52	Liu Fangyi	(China)	–	–	4	4	–	–	–	–	–	–	8
53	Teruhiro Sugimori	(Japan)	6	0	–	–	–	–	–	–	–	–	6
54	Lee Kang-seok	(South Korea)	5	0	–	–	–	–	–	–	–	–	5
55	Eric Rauschenbach	(Germany)	–	–	–	–	–	–	1	4	0	–	5
56	Pasi Koskela	(Finland)	0	0	0	0	1	2	0	0	0	–	3
57	Maciej Ustynowicz	(Poland)	–	–	–	–	–	–	–	0	2	–	2
57	Vladimir Sherstyuk	(Kazakhstan)	–	–	–	–	–	–	0	2	–	–	2
59	Roman Krech	(Kazakhstan)	–	–	–	–	–	–	–	–	1	–	1
59	Aleksandr Komar	(Belarus)	0	0	0	0	0	1	0	0	0	–	1
