= 2008–09 ISU Speed Skating World Cup – Women's 1000 metres =

The 1000 metres distance for women in the 2008–09 ISU Speed Skating World Cup was contested over 10 races on seven occasions, out of a total of nine World Cup occasions for the season, with the first occasion taking place in Berlin, Germany, on 7–9 November 2008, and the final occasion taking place in Salt Lake City, United States, on 6–7 March 2009.

Christine Nesbitt of Canada won the cup, while fellow Canadian Kristina Groves came second, and Laurine van Riessen of the Netherlands came third.

Defending champion Anni Friesinger of Germany was injured in bicycle accident in the summer of 2008, leading to an operation to her right knee. Having recovered, she made a strong return to the World Cup towards the end of the season, and finished in eighth place after winning the last two races.

== Top three ==
Medal	Athlete	Points	Previous season
Gold	(Canada) Christine Nesbitt	646	6th
Silver	(Canada) Kristina Groves	507	12th
Bronze	(Netherlands) Laurine van Riessen	468	–

== Race medallists ==
Occasion #	Location	Date	Gold	Time	Silver	Time	Bronze	Time	Report
1	Berlin, Germany	9 November	Christine Nesbitt; Canada	1:16.86	Shannon Rempel; Canada	1:17.11	Laurine van Riessen; Netherlands	1:17.21	
2	Heerenveen, Netherlands	16 November	Christine Nesbitt; Canada	1:16.18	Kristina Groves; Canada	1:16.76	Wang Beixing; China	1:17.01	
4	Changchun, China	6 December	Kristina Groves; Canada	1:18.18	Shannon Rempel; Canada	1:18.20	Laurine van Riessen; Netherlands	1:18.48	
4	Changchun, China	7 December	Laurine van Riessen; Netherlands	1:17.25	Kristina Groves; Canada	1:17.80	Shannon Rempel; Canada	1:18.27	
5	Nagano, Japan	13 December	Jennifer Rodriguez; United States	1:16.34	Christine Nesbitt; Canada	1:16.39	Kristina Groves; Canada	1:16.65	
5	Nagano, Japan	14 December	Christine Nesbitt; Canada	1:16.38	Yu Jing; China	1:17.37	Jin Peiyu; China	1:17.60	
6	Kolomna, Russia	24 January	Margot Boer; Netherlands	1:15.84	Yu Jing; China	1:16.04	Christine Nesbitt; Canada	1:16.26	
6	Kolomna, Russia	25 January	Margot Boer; Netherlands	1:15.79	Anni Friesinger; Germany	1:15.81	Christine Nesbitt; Canada	1:15.85	
7	Erfurt, Germany	1 February	Anni Friesinger; Germany	1:15.61	Yu Jing; China	1:16.41	Jin Peiyu; China	1:16.42	
9	Salt Lake City, United States	6 March	Anni Friesinger; Germany	1:13.86	Sayuri Yoshii; Japan	1:14.05	Christine Nesbitt; Canada	1:14.41	

== Finals standings ==
Standings as of 7 March 2009 (end of the season).

#	Name	Nat.	BER	HVN	CHA1	CHA2	NAG1	NAG2	KOL1	KOL2	ERF	SLC	Total
1	Christine Nesbitt	(Canada)	100	100			80	100	70	70	21	105	646
2	Kristina Groves	(Canada)	50	80	100	80	70	50			32	45	507
3	Laurine van Riessen	(Netherlands)	70	60	70	100			40	36	60	32	468
4	Shannon Rempel	(Canada)	80	50	80	70	50	45		45	18	28	452
5	Margot Boer	(Netherlands)			25	15	21	32	100	100	40	90	423
6	Monique Angermüller	(Germany)	36	50	45	60	28	40	18	16	36	75	404
7	Sayuri Yoshii	(Japan)	16	21	24	21	60	36	32	32	28	120	390
8	Anni Friesinger	(Germany)							45	80	100	150	375
9	Yu Jing	(China)			15	25	40	80	80	50	80		370
10	Jin Peiyu	(China)			19	19	32	70	36	60	70	5	311
11	Jennifer Rodriguez	(United States)	28	32			100	60	16	28	10	18	292
12	Annette Gerritsen	(Netherlands)	60	45	36	18			50	40		12	261
13	Yekaterina Lobysheva	(Russia)	18	40	50	50	36			21	14	24	253
14	Ren Hui	(China)	14	16	40	14	24	18	24		50		200
15	Shihomi Shinya	(Japan)	1	11	32	40	16	24	28		16	10	178
16	Brittany Schussler	(Canada)	8	19	60	45					45		177
17	Yekaterina Malysheva	(Russia)	3	25	28		45		60				161
18	Natasja Bruintjes	(Netherlands)	24	24					19	25	24	36	152
19	Wang Beixing	(China)	40	70								40	150
20	Tomomi Okazaki	(Japan)	15	10	21	36	10	21	6	8	6	16	149
21	Lee Sang-hwa	(South Korea)	21	12	16	24	18	28				14	133
22	Heather Richardson	(United States)		6			15	19	21	18	8	21	108
23	Heike Hartmann	(Germany)	10	5	18	16	6	10	12	10	12	8	107
24	Yekaterina Shikhova	(Russia)			11	11	19	15	14	24	5	6	105
25	Elli Ochowicz	(United States)	25	14			14		8	12	6		79
26	Lee Bo-ra	(South Korea)	4		14	28	12	12					70
27	Marianne Timmer	(Netherlands)			12	32	8	14					66
28	Marrit Leenstra	(Netherlands)	45								19		64
29	Paulien van Deutekom	(Netherlands)		28							25		53
30	Nao Kodaira	(Japan)	32					16					48
31	Gabriele Hirschbichler	(Germany)	4	4	8	8	6	1	2	11			44
32	Maki Tabata	(Japan)	19	6							15		40
33	Zhang Shuang	(Netherlands)			6	4	25						35
34	Yuliya Nemaya	(Russia)	2	15	6	12							35
35	Chiara Simionato	(Italy)							10	14	8		32
36	Ireen Wüst	(Netherlands)	12	18									30
37	Anzhelika Kotyuga	(Belarus)		1	2		11	8	6				28
38	Sanne Delfgou	(Netherlands)			8	8		11					27
39	Yuliya Skokova	(Russia)							11	15			26
40	Alla Shabanova	(Russia)							25				25
40	Jenny Wolf	(Germany)						25					25
42	Maki Tsuji	(Japan)							15	8	2		25
43	Xing Aihua	(China)	6	8	10								24
44	Yekaterina Abramova	(Russia)								19	4		23
45	Dong Feifei	(China)	11	8									19
46	Kerry Dankers	(Canada)						4	8	4			16
47	Tamara Oudenaarden	(Canada)	2			10	2						14
48	Rebekah Bradford	(United States)					4	6		2	1		13
49	Svetlana Kaykan	(Russia)									11		11
50	Justine L'Heureux	(Canada)					8	2					10
51	Ko Hyon-Suk	(North Korea)			4	6							10
52	Kim Yoo-rim	(South Korea)	8										8
53	Angelina Golikova	(Russia)								6			6
53	Pamela Zoellner	(Germany)	6										6
55	Judith Hesse	(Germany)	5										5
56	Svetlana Radkevich	(Belarus)					1		4				5
57	Danielle Wotherspoon	(Canada)				2			1				3
58	Katarzyna Wójcicka	(Poland)		2									2
59	Anna Badayeva	(Belarus)		–						1			1
59	Sayuri Osuga	(Japan)			1								1
59	Jennifer Plate	(Germany)				1							1
59	Sheng Xiaomei	(China)	1										1
