= 2008–09 ISU Speed Skating World Cup – Men's 500 metres =

The 500 metres distance for men in the 2008–09 ISU Speed Skating World Cup was contested over 13 races on seven occasions, out of a total of nine World Cup occasions for the season, with the first occasion taking place in Berlin, Germany, on 7–9 November 2008, and the final occasion taking place in Salt Lake City, United States, on 6–7 March 2009.

Yu Fengtong of China won the cup, while Keiichiro Nagashima of Japan came second, and Tucker Fredricks of the United States came third. Defending champion Jeremy Wotherspoon of Canada suffered an arm injury in race 2 of the first occasion, which stopped him from participating in the rest of the World Cup season.

== Top three ==
Medal	Athlete	Points	Previous season
Gold	(China) Yu Fengtong	1086	14th
Silver	(Japan) Keiichiro Nagashima	957	9th
Bronze	(United States) Tucker Fredricks	642	8th

== Race medallists ==
Occasion #	Location	Date	Gold	Time	Silver	Time	Bronze	Time	Report
1	Berlin, Germany	7 November	Keiichiro Nagashima; Japan	34.92	Pekka Koskela; Finland	34.99	Lee Kyou-hyuk; South Korea	35.01	
1	Berlin, Germany	8 November	Joji Kato; Japan	34.70	Yu Fengtong; China	35.07	Mika Poutala; Finland	35.13	
2	Heerenveen, Netherlands	14 November	Pekka Koskela; Finland	34.88	Dmitry Lobkov; Russia	35.16	Yu Fengtong; China	35.18	
2	Heerenveen, Netherlands	15 November	Joji Kato; Japan	34.82	Yu Fengtong; China	35.05	Pekka Koskela; Finland	35.09	
4	Changchun, China	6 December	Yu Fengtong; China	34.97	Keiichiro Nagashima; Japan	35.08	Lee Kyou-hyuk; South Korea	35.27	
4	Changchun, China	7 December	Dmitry Lobkov; Russia	35.07	Yu Fengtong; China	35.09	Keiichiro Nagashima; Japan	35.20	
5	Nagano, Japan	13 December	Keiichiro Nagashima; Japan	34.81	Yu Fengtong; China	34.91	Joji Kato; Japan	35.06	
5	Nagano, Japan	14 December	Lee Kyou-hyuk; South Korea	34.92	Yu Fengtong; China	34.95	Joji Kato; Japan	34.96	
6	Kolomna, Russia	24 January	Keiichiro Nagashima; Japan	34.85	Yu Fengtong; China	34.89	Yuya Oikawa; Japan	34.96	
6	Kolomna, Russia	25 January	Tucker Fredricks; United States	34.81	Keiichiro Nagashima; Japan	34.87	Yu Fengtong; China	34.89	
7	Erfurt, Germany	30 January	Yu Fengtong; China	35.03	Keiichiro Nagashima; Japan	35.04	Tucker Fredricks; United States	35.12	
7	Erfurt, Germany	31 January	Tucker Fredricks; United States	34.91	Yu Fengtong; China	35.00	Jan Smeekens; Netherlands	35.26	
9	Salt Lake City, United States	6 March	Yu Fengtong; China	34.37	Lee Kyou-hyuk; South Korea	34.38	Tucker Fredricks; United States	34.51	

== Final standings ==
Standings as of 8 March 2009 (end of the season).

#	Name	Nat.	BER1	BER2	HVN1	HVN2	CHA1	CHA2	NAG1	NAG2	KOL1	KOL2	ERF1	ERF2	SLC	Total
1	Yu Fengtong	(China)	36	80	70	80	100	80	80	80	80	70	100	80	150	1086
2	Keiichiro Nagashima	(Japan)	100	60	45	32	80	70	100	60	100	80	80	60	90	957
3	Tucker Fredricks	(United States)	50	32	40	40	–	–	21	40	60	100	70	100	105	642
4	Mika Poutala	(Finland)	45	70	60	60	45	50	40	45	50	60	16	12	40	593
5	Lee Kyou-hyuk	(South Korea)	70	40	50	36	70	45	50	100	–	–	–	–	120	581
6	Joji Kato	(Japan)	3	100	6	100	36	60	70	70	8	32	6	6	45	542
7	Yuya Oikawa	(Japan)	15	19	32	21	50	36	6	32	70	28	50	24	75	458
8	Dmitry Lobkov	(Russia)	60	36	80	45	0	100	0	40	36	0	–	–	2	399
9	Pekka Koskela	(Finland)	80	45	100	70	–	–	60	5	–	–	0	–	–	360
10	Zhang Zhongqi	(China)	25	25	36	18	40	32	32	16	45	50	–	–	21	340
11	Jan Smeekens	(Netherlands)	10	21	18	50	16	14	16	14	16	14	45	70	24	328
12	Simon Kuipers	(Netherlands)	2	16	25	25	60	18	–	–	32	36	60	40	14	328
13	Lee Kang-seok	(South Korea)	32	50	21	24	21	40	45	50	–	–	–	–	28	311
14	Tadashi Obara	(Japan)	12	5	0	0	25	25	36	36	40	40	36	10	18	283
15	Jamie Gregg	(Canada)	14	8	–	–	19	15	24	21	28	45	40	36	32	282
16	Shani Davis	(United States)	6	15	24	6	18	21	18	12	5	–	28	50	36	239
17	Mark Tuitert	(Netherlands)	24	14	0	14	28	24	–	–	24	18	14	14	3	177
18	Zhang Yaolin	(China)	–	–	–	–	11	11	4	25	14	24	32	45	10	176
19	Stefan Groothuis	(Netherlands)	21	10	14	10	14	16	–	–	21	16	12	32	6	172
20	Mo Tae-bum	(South Korea)	4	18	28	16	32	12	28	28	–	–	–	–	–	166
21	Muncef Ouardi	(Canada)	8	11	8	15	8	10	14	10	12	12	24	16	10	158
22	Vincent Labrie	(Canada)	28	28	16	0	–	–	–	–	19	15	18	21	12	157
23	Lee Ki-ho	(South Korea)	8	12	19	15	24	8	12	18	–	–	–	–	16	132
24	Beorn Nijenhuis	(Netherlands)	18	6	10	12	–	–	–	–	11	8	15	25	5	110
25	Pasi Koskela	(Finland)	11	4	15	19	6	6	10	6	0	0	25	–	4	106
26	Sergey Chadayev	(Russia)	0	0	0	0	8	6	25	0	18	21	8	18	–	104
27	Ermanno Ioriatti	(Italy)	–	–	–	–	–	–	–	–	25	25	21	28	–	99
28	An Weijiang	(China)	16	24	12	28	–	–	–	–	–	–	–	–	–	80
29	Nico Ihle	(Germany)	2	1	11	4	0	0	2	15	4	11	4	15	–	69
30	Kyle Parrott	(Canada)	–	–	–	–	4	8	11	2	–	–	19	19	–	63
31	Brent Aussprung	(United States)	6	4	1	0	–	–	0	19	10	10	0	8	–	58
32	Hiroyasu Shimizu	(Japan)	19	8	8	8	12	–	–	–	–	–	–	–	–	55
33	Mun Jun	(South Korea)	–	–	–	–	10	28	6	6	–	–	–	–	–	50
34	Liu Fangyi	(China)	–	–	–	–	15	19	8	8	–	–	–	–	–	50
35	Christopher Needham	(United States)	0	0	6	2	–	–	8	11	0	2	11	6	–	46
36	Maciej Ustynowicz	(Poland)	–	–	–	–	–	–	–	–	8	19	10	8	–	45
37	Denny Morrison	(Canada)	–	2	0	6	0	2	15	4	15	–	–	1	–	45
38	Jeremy Wotherspoon	(Canada)	40	0	–	–	–	–	–	–	–	–	–	–	–	40
39	Mike Blumel	(United States)	0	0	0	1	–	–	19	0	6	8	–	–	–	34
40	Tuomas Nieminen	(Finland)	4	0	2	0	0	0	0	0	6	6	8	0	–	26
41	Frank Steiner	(Germany)	0	2	4	0	0	0	0	8	0	0	6	2	–	22
42	François-Olivier Roberge	(Canada)	–	–	0	8	2	4	1	1	0	4	0	–	–	20
43	Markus Puolakka	(Finland)	0	0	0	0	–	–	–	–	0	0	0	11	–	11
44	Artur Waś	(Poland)	5	3	0	0	–	–	–	–	–	–	–	–	–	8
45	Aleksandr Lebedev	(Russia)	0	–	0	0	6	1	0	–	0	–	–	–	–	7
46	Lee Jong-woo	(South Korea)	–	6	–	–	–	–	–	–	–	–	–	–	–	6
47	Mitchell Whitmore	(United States)	–	–	–	–	–	–	–	–	–	–	2	4	–	6
48	Matthias Schwierz	(Germany)	0	0	0	0	0	0	0	0	2	1	0	0	–	3
49	Jan Friesinger	(Germany)	–	–	–	–	–	–	–	–	–	–	1	–	–	1
49	Takaharu Nakajima	(Japan)	–	–	–	–	–	–	–	–	1	0	–	–	–	1
49	Yevgeny Lalenkov	(Russia)	1	–	–	–	–	–	–	–	–	–	–	–	–	1
49	Nan Minghao	(China)	–	–	–	–	1	0	0	0	–	–	–	–	–	1
