= 2008–09 ISU Speed Skating World Cup – Men's 1500 metres =

The 1500 metres distance for men in the 2008–09 ISU Speed Skating World Cup was contested over six races on six occasions, out of a total of nine World Cup occasions for the season, with the first occasion taking place in Berlin, Germany, on 7–9 November 2008, and the final occasion taking place in Salt Lake City, United States, on 6–7 March 2009.

Shani Davis of the United States defended his title from the previous season, while fellow American Trevor Marsicano came second, and Håvard Bøkko of Norway came third.

On the last competition weekend of the season, Davis set a new world record of 1:41.80.

== Top three ==
Medal	Athlete	Points	Previous season
Gold	(United States) Shani Davis	470	1st
Silver	(United States) Trevor Marsicano	374	25th
Bronze	(Norway) Håvard Bøkko	363	9th

== Race medallists ==
Occasion #	Location	Date	Gold	Time	Silver	Time	Bronze	Time	Report
1	Berlin, Germany	8 November	Sven Kramer; Netherlands	1:45.69	Erben Wennemars; Netherlands	1:45.85	Simon Kuipers; Netherlands	1:45.95	
2	Heerenveen, Netherlands	14 November	Shani Davis; United States	1:45.23	Stefan Groothuis; Netherlands	1:45.84	Mark Tuitert; Netherlands	1:45.90	
3	Moscow, Russia	22 November	Håvard Bøkko; Norway	1:45.46	Mark Tuitert; Netherlands	1:45.81	Enrico Fabris; Italy	1:46.00	
7	Erfurt, Germany	31 January	Denny Morrison; Canada	1:45.32	Trevor Marsicano; United States	1:46.00	Shani Davis; United States	1:46.25	
8	Heerenveen, Netherlands	15 February	Shani Davis; United States	1:45.40	Enrico Fabris; Italy	1:45.88	Trevor Marsicano; United States	1:46.09	
9	Salt Lake City, United States	6 March	Shani Davis; United States	1:41.80; WR	Trevor Marsicano; United States	1:42.31	Denny Morrison; Canada	1:42.56	

== Final standings ==
Standings as of 7 March 2009 (end of the season).

#	Name	Nat.	BER	HVN1	MOS	ERF	HVN2	SLC	Total
1	Shani Davis	(United States)	50	100	–	70	100	150	470
2	Trevor Marsicano	(United States)	24	40	40	80	70	120	374
3	Håvard Bøkko	(Norway)	45	60	100	50	18	90	363
4	Enrico Fabris	(Italy)	18	36	70	45	80	45	294
5	Mark Tuitert	(Netherlands)	60	70	80	6	36	40	292
6	Chad Hedrick	(United States)	40	45	–	40	60	75	260
7	Denny Morrison	(Canada)	36	6	–	100	–	105	247
8	Sven Kramer	(Netherlands)	100	24	–	60	45	–	229
9	Stefan Groothuis	(Netherlands)	28	80	36	24	50	–	218
10	Erben Wennemars	(Netherlands)	80	50	60	–	–	–	190
11	Simon Kuipers	(Netherlands)	70	32	45	–	28	–	175
12	Lucas Makowsky	(Canada)	21	16	32	36	21	16	142
13	Yevgeny Lalenkov	(Russia)	32	18	50	–	–	21	121
14	Christoffer Fagerli Rukke	(Norway)	14	12	12	16	24	24	102
15	Wouter olde Heuvel	(Netherlands)	–	–	–	25	40	36	101
16	Steven Elm	(Canada)	4	11	18	18	14	32	97
17	Teruhiro Sugimori	(Japan)	25	10	8	21	16	12	92
18	Konrad Niedźwiedzki	(Poland)	16	5	10	28	32	–	91
19	Lee Jong-woo	(South Korea)	15	21	24	–	–	28	88
20	Robert Lehmann	(Germany)	6	8	21	32	12	0	79
21	Ivan Skobrev	(Russia)	–	28	28	–	–	18	74
22	François-Olivier Roberge	(Canada)	12	14	16	10	6	14	72
23	Daniel Friberg	(Sweden)	19	8	–	14	25	–	66
24	Sverre Haugli	(Norway)	–	4	25	12	10	10	61
25	Samuel Schwarz	(Germany)	5	19	–	11	8	–	43
26	Mo Tae-bum	(South Korea)	8	25	–	–	–	–	33
27	Jörg Dallmann	(Germany)	11	2	14	4	0	–	31
28	Jan Friesinger	(Germany)	–	–	–	19	8	–	27
29	Matteo Anesi	(Italy)	1	0	15	8	2	–	26
30	Jay Morrison	(Canada)	–	–	6	–	19	–	25
31	Mikael Flygind-Larsen	(Norway)	8	15	–	–	–	–	23
32	Tobias Schneider	(Germany)	10	6	5	–	–	–	21
33	Stefan Heythausen	(Germany)	0	–	–	15	5	–	20
34	Choi Kwun-won	(South Korea)	–	0	19	–	–	–	19
35	Dmitry Babenko	(Kazakhstan)	3	0	0	2	11	–	16
36	Pascal Briand	(France)	0	0	0	0	15	–	15
37	Song Xingyu	(China)	6	0	6	–	–	–	12
38	Jeff Kitura	(Canada)	0	0	11	–	–	–	11
39	Aleksey Yesin	(Russia)	1	1	–	8	–	–	10
40	Aleksandr Lebedev	(Russia)	2	–	1	6	–	–	9
41	Johan Röjler	(Sweden)	–	–	8	–	–	–	8
42	Hiroki Hirako	(Japan)	4	0	4	–	0	–	8
43	Denis Kuzin	(Kazakhstan)	0	0	0	0	6	–	6
44	Jonathan Kuck	(United States)	–	–	–	–	4	–	4
45	Marco Weber	(Germany)	–	0	2	–	–	–	2
45	Timofey Skopin	(Russia)	2	0	–	–	–	–	2
47	Mathieu Giroux	(Canada)	–	–	–	1	1	–	2
