= 2008–09 ISU Speed Skating World Cup – Women's 500 metres =

The 500 metres distance for women in the 2008–09 ISU Speed Skating World Cup was contested over 13 races on seven occasions, out of a total of nine World Cup occasions for the season, with the first occasion taking place in Berlin, Germany, on 7–9 November 2008, and the final occasion taking place in Salt Lake City, United States, on 6–7 March 2009.

Jenny Wolf of Germany successfully defended her title, while Margot Boer of the Netherlands came second. Lee Sang-hwa of South Korea repeated her third place from the previous season.

== Top three ==
Medal	Athlete	Points	Previous season
Gold	(Germany) Jenny Wolf	1205	1st
Silver	(Netherlands) Margot Boer	642	13th
Bronze	(South Korea) Lee Sang-hwa	635	3rd

== Race medallists ==
Occasion #	Location	Date	Gold	Time	Silver	Time	Bronze	Time	Report
1	Berlin, Germany	7 November	Jenny Wolf; Germany	37.75	Wang Beixing; China	37.75	Lee Sang-hwa; South Korea	38.12	
1	Berlin, Germany	8 November	Wang Beixing; China	37.91	Jenny Wolf; Germany	37.95	Lee Sang-hwa; South Korea	38.26	
2	Heerenveen, Netherlands	14 November	Jenny Wolf; Germany	37.60	Wang Beixing; China	37.63	Lee Sang-hwa; South Korea	38.22	
2	Heerenveen, Netherlands	15 November	Jenny Wolf; Germany	37.64	Wang Beixing; China	37.74	Lee Sang-hwa; South Korea	38.13	
4	Changchun, China	6 December	Jenny Wolf; Germany	38.09	Lee Sang-hwa; South Korea	38.71	Annette Gerritsen; Netherlands	38.86	
4	Changchun, China	7 December	Jenny Wolf; Germany	37.98	Annette Gerritsen; Netherlands	38.52	Lee Sang-hwa; South Korea	38.56	
5	Nagano, Japan	13 December	Jenny Wolf; Germany	37.71	Lee Sang-hwa; South Korea	38.39	Sayuri Yoshii; Japan	38.66	
5	Nagano, Japan	14 December	Yu Jing; China	38.63	Lee Sang-hwa; South Korea	38.72	Xing Aihua; China	38.78	
6	Kolomna, Russia	24 January	Jenny Wolf; Germany	37.51	Annette Gerritsen; Netherlands	38.02	Yu Jing; China	38.17	
6	Kolomna, Russia	25 January	Jenny Wolf; Germany	37.67	Jin Peiyu; China	38.01	Yu Jing; China	38.13	
7	Erfurt, Germany	30 January	Jenny Wolf; Germany	37.58	Yu Jing; China	38.18	Jin Peiyu; China	38.30	
7	Erfurt, Germany	31 January	Jenny Wolf; Germany	37.85	Yu Jing; China	38.00	Annette Gerritsen; Netherlands	38.28	
9	Salt Lake City, United States	7 March	Wang Beixing; China	37.25	Jenny Wolf; Germany	37.39	Yu Jing; China	37.62	

== Final standings ==
Standings as of 8 March 2009 (end of the season).

#	Name	Nat.	BER1	BER2	HVN1	HVN2	CHA1	CHA2	NAG1	NAG2	KOL1	KOL2	ERF1	ERF2	SLC	Total
1	Jenny Wolf	(Germany)	100	80	100	100	100	100	100	5	100	100	100	100	120	1205
2	Margot Boer	(Netherlands)	40	40	50	60	60	36	24	60	60	40	32	50	90	642
3	Lee Sang-hwa	(South Korea)	70	70	70	70	80	70	80	80					45	635
4	Annette Gerritsen	(Netherlands)	50	60	60	50	70	80			80	50	60	70		630
5	Yu Jing	(China)					25	25	50	100	70	70	80	80	105	605
6	Sayuri Yoshii	(Japan)	60	45	36	40	32	28	70	45	40	32	21	28	40	517
7	Wang Beixing	(China)	80	100	80	80									150	490
8	Tomomi Okazaki	(Japan)	16	14	45	45	45	50	12	50	21	18	18	16	75	425
9	Sayuri Osuga	(Japan)	32	28	40	24	21	45	40	36	32	16	36	45	28	423
10	Ren Hui	(China)	14	8	8	16	50	32	36	18	50	24	50	60	16	382
11	Xing Aihua	(China)	18	18	16	14	40	60	32	70	12	10	40	40		370
12	Yuliya Nemaya	(Russia)	25	25	14	21	12	40	21	32	45	60	28	24	8	355
13	Jin Peiyu	(China)					19	19	60	24	16	80	70	36		324
14	Yekaterina Malysheva	(Russia)	21	12	32	28	16	21	45	40	24	36			18	293
15	Marianne Timmer	(Netherlands)	24	36	6	36	14	24		21			45		32	238
16	Lee Bo-ra	(South Korea)	36	32	28	18	28	18	6	28					21	215
17	Thijsje Oenema	(Netherlands)	8	15	10	10	8	8	6	19	18	21	16	21	36	196
18	Shihomi Shinya	(Japan)					15	15			36	45	24	32	24	191
19	Shannon Rempel	(Canada)	28	24	18	12	36	14	14	10		14			10	180
20	Monique Angermüller	(Germany)		21	19		24	16	28	14	28	12		14		176
21	Elli Ochowicz	(United States)	10	16	21	36			16	6	6	6	14	18	12	161
22	Svetlana Kaykan	(Russia)	4	4	15	15					10	28	25	25	14	140
23	Yukari Watanabe	(Japan)	12	10	12	8	18	12	10	8	14	5	8	10	6	133
24	Nao Kodaira	(Japan)	45	50	5				8	12						120
25	Christine Nesbitt	(Canada)	19	19	24				18	16			12			108
26	Zhang Shuang	(China)	6	5		19	10	10	25	25						100
27	Anzhelika Kotyuga	(Belarus)	1			1	11	11	15	8	8	8	8	11		82
28	Heather Richardson	(United States)	2		1	6			8	6	11	19	10	12		75
29	Sheng Xiaomei	(China)	11	11	25	25										72
30	Judith Hesse	(Germany)	5	6		11					15	25		8		70
31	Heike Hartmann	(Germany)	3	2	8	4	5	5			19	11	6	6		69
32	Yekaterina Lobysheva	(Russia)	15	2			6	6	19	15	5					68
33	Chiara Simionato	(Italy)									2	15	19	19		55
34	Tamara Oudenaarden	(Canada)	4	4			6	6		2		8	15	6		51
35	Jennifer Rodriguez	(United States)			4				11	11	6		11	4		47
36	Natasja Bruintjes	(Netherlands)	6	8	2	8						2	1	8		35
37	Mayon Kuipers	(Netherlands)									25	6				31
38	Pamela Zoellner	(Germany)	8	3	11	2										24
39	Paulina Wallin	(Sweden)		6	6						8	4				24
40	Kim Weger	(Canada)											6	15		21
41	Yekaterina Shikhova	(Russia)					4	8								12
42	Rebekah Bradford	(United States)	1						4	4						9
43	Laurine van Riessen	(Netherlands)					8									8
44	Danielle Wotherspoon	(Canada)					2	2	2	1						7
45	Kerry Dankers	(Canada)											4	1		5
46	Gabriele Hirschbichler	(Germany)					1				4					5
47	Ko Hyon-Suk	(North Korea)						4								4
48	Yekaterina Abramova	(Russia)										1	2			3
49	Lauren Cholewinski	(United States)		1										2		3
50	Jennifer Plate	(Germany)	2													2
51	Svetlana Radkevich	(Belarus)							1		1					2
52	Anna Badayeva	(Belarus)						1								1
