= 2008–09 ISU Speed Skating World Cup – Women's 1500 metres =

The 1500 metres distance for women in the 2008–09 ISU Speed Skating World Cup was contested over six races on six occasions, out of a total of nine World Cup occasions for the season, with the first occasion taking place in Berlin, Germany, on 7–9 November 2008, and the final occasion taking place in Salt Lake City, United States, on 6–7 March 2009.

Kristina Groves of Canada successfully defended her title from the previous season, while Daniela Anschütz-Thoms of Germany came second, and Christine Nesbitt of Canada, the previous season's runner-up, came third.

== Top three ==
Medal	Athlete	Points	Previous season
Gold	(Canada) Kristina Groves	526	1st
Silver	(Germany) Daniela Anschütz-Thoms	355	6th
Bronze	(Canada) Christine Nesbitt	335	2nd

== Race medallists ==
Occasion #	Location	Date	Gold	Time	Silver	Time	Bronze	Time	Report
1	Berlin, Germany	7 November	Kristina Groves; Canada	1:57.65	Brittany Schussler; Canada	1:57.74	Shannon Rempel; Canada	1:58.04	
2	Heerenveen, Netherlands	15 November	Kristina Groves; Canada	1:57.22	Daniela Anschütz-Thoms; Germany	1:57.91	Christine Nesbitt; Canada	1:58.08	
3	Moscow, Russia	23 November	Claudia Pechstein; Germany	1:55.96	Christine Nesbitt; Canada	1:56.40	Kristina Groves; Canada	1:56.76	
7	Erfurt, Germany	30 January	Anni Friesinger; Germany	1:56.90	Daniela Anschütz-Thoms; Germany	1:58.13	Ireen Wüst; Netherlands	1:58.54	
8	Heerenveen, Netherlands	15 February	Anni Friesinger; Germany	1:57.48	Christine Nesbitt; Canada	1:57.58	Kristina Groves; Canada	1:58.40	
9	Salt Lake City, United States	7 March	Kristina Groves; Canada	1:54.08	Maki Tabata; Japan	1:54.79	Brittany Schussler; Canada	1:54.91	

== Final standings ==
Standings as of 8 March 2009 (end of the season).

#	Name	Nat.	BER	HVN1	MOS	ERF	HVN2	SLC	Total
1	Kristina Groves	(Canada)	100	100	70	36	70	150	526
2	Daniela Anschütz-Thoms	(Germany)	60	80	60	80	–	75	355
3	Christine Nesbitt	(Canada)	45	70	80	60	80	–	335
4	Brittany Schussler	(Canada)	80	32	21	50	40	105	328
5	Shannon Rempel	(Canada)	70	36	36	21	–	90	253
6	Ireen Wüst	(Netherlands)	36	40	–	70	60	24	230
7	Maki Tabata	(Japan)	32	10	14	28	14	120	218
8	Laurine van Riessen	(Netherlands)	28	50	45	18	32	32	205
9	Anni Friesinger	(Germany)	–	–	–	100	100	–	200
10	Claudia Pechstein	(Germany)	–	60	100	40	–	–	200
11	Marrit Leenstra	(Netherlands)	24	45	18	24	45	21	177
12	Katarzyna Wójcicka	(Poland)	8	6	25	6	50	40	135
13	Masako Hozumi	(Japan)	21	21	32	10	28	18	130
14	Elma de Vries	(Netherlands)	40	16	24	–	–	36	116
15	Yekaterina Lobysheva	(Russia)	12	28	28	16	–	28	112
16	Martina Sáblíková	(Czech Republic)	50	–	10	45	–	–	105
17	Monique Angermüller	(Germany)	18	24	–	12	–	45	99
18	Maren Haugli	(Norway)	25	12	6	14	24	14	95
19	Alla Shabanova	(Russia)	15	8	19	32	–	16	90
20	Jorien Voorhuis	(Netherlands)	–	–	50	25	–	–	75
21	Lisette van der Geest	(Netherlands)	–	–	–	19	36	12	67
22	Clara Hughes	(Canada)	10	19	16	5	–	10	60
23	Lucille Opitz	(Germany)	16	14	8	–	10	6	54
24	Paulien van Deutekom	(Netherlands)	6	25	–	–	12	–	43
25	Diane Valkenburg	(Netherlands)	–	–	40	–	–	–	40
26	Noh Seon-yeong	(South Korea)	8	15	12	–	–	–	35
27	Dong Feifei	(China)	3	8	15	8	–	–	34
28	Maria Lamb	(United States)	–	–	–	–	25	8	33
29	Hiromi Otsu	(Japan)	4	0	4	6	18	–	32
30	Jennifer Rodriguez	(United States)	14	18	–	–	–	–	32
31	Katrin Mattscherodt	(Germany)	19	6	5	–	–	–	30
32	Galina Likhachova	(Russia)	6	11	1	11	–	–	29
33	Yekaterina Shikhova	(Russia)	–	–	11	15	–	–	26
34	Luiza Złotkowska	(Poland)	–	0	–	2	21	–	23
35	Lee Ju-yeon	(South Korea)	11	4	6	–	–	–	21
36	Karolína Erbanová	(Czech Republic)	0	–	–	0	19	–	19
37	Nancy Swider-Peltz, Jr	(United States)	2	0	–	0	16	–	18
38	Nicole Garrido	(Canada)	–	–	–	–	15	–	15
39	Yuri Obara	(Japan)	1	0	–	8	6	–	15
40	Xu Jinjin	(China)	5	–	8	–	–	–	13
41	Isabell Ost	(Germany)	–	–	–	4	8	–	12
42	Anna Rokita	(Austria)	0	0	0	–	11	–	11
43	Eriko Ishino	(Japan)	–	–	0	0	8	–	8
44	Stephanie Beckert	(Germany)	–	–	0	–	6	–	6
45	Fu Chunyan	(China)	4	2	0	0	–	–	6
46	Alexandra Lipp	(Germany)	–	–	–	–	4	–	4
47	Yang Gao	(China)	2	0	2	0	–	–	4
48	Natalya Rybakova	(Kazakhstan)	0	0	0	0	2	–	2
49	Daniela Dumitru	(Romania)	–	–	–	0	1	–	1
50	Yekaterina Abramova	(Russia)	–	–	–	1	–	–	1
50	Yuliya Yasenok	(Belarus)	0	1	–	0	–	–	1
