= 2008–09 ISU Speed Skating World Cup – Women's 100 metres =

The 100 metres distance for women in the 2008–09 ISU Speed Skating World Cup was contested over four races on four occasions, out of a total of nine World Cup occasions for the season, with the first occasion involving the distance taking place in Changchun, China, on 6–7 December 2008, and the final occasion taking place in Salt Lake City, United States, on 6–7 March 2009.

Jenny Wolf of Germany successfully defended her title, while Thijsje Oenema of the Netherlands came second, and Xing Aihua of China came third.

== Top three ==
Medal	Athlete	Points	Previous season
Gold	(Germany) Jenny Wolf	450	1st
Silver	(Netherlands) Thijsje Oenema	236	–
Bronze	(China) Xing Aihua	230	7th

== Race medallists ==
Occasion #	Location	Date	Gold	Time	Silver	Time	Bronze	Time	Report
4	Changchun, China	6 December	Jenny Wolf; Germany	10.23	Xing Aihua; China	10.27	Lee Sang-hwa; South Korea	10.67	
5	Nagano, Japan	14 December	Jenny Wolf; Germany	10.40	Xing Aihua; China	10.42	Sayuri Osuga; Japan	10.81	
6	Kolomna, Russia	25 January	Jenny Wolf; Germany	10.33	Judith Hesse; Germany	10.56	Xing Aihua; China	10.59	
9	Salt Lake City, United States	7 March	Jenny Wolf; Germany	10.25	Yu Jing; China	10.44	Shihomi Shinya; Japan	10.45	

== Final standings ==
Standings as of 8 March 2009 (end of the season).

#	Name	Nat.	CHA	NAG	KOL	SLC	Tot.
1	Jenny Wolf	(Germany)	100	100	100	150	450
2	Thijsje Oenema	(Netherlands)	36	60	50	90	236
3	Xing Aihua	(China)	80	80	70	–	230
4	Sayuri Osuga	(Japan)	45	70	60	45	220
5	Yu Jing	(China)	50	24	16	120	210
6	Shihomi Shinya	(Japan)	60	–	24	105	189
7	Svetlana Kaykan	(Russia)	–	–	45	75	120
8	Lee Sang-hwa	(South Korea)	70	32	–	–	102
9	Yuliya Nemaya	(Russia)	4	4	40	40	88
10	Judith Hesse	(Germany)	–	–	80	–	80
11	Jennifer Plate	(Germany)	32	45	–	–	77
12	Tomomi Okazaki	(Japan)	24	28	21	–	73
13	Jin Peiyu	(China)	10	50	10	–	70
14	Zhang Shuang	(China)	40	18	–	–	58
14	Ren Hui	(China)	6	40	12	–	58
16	Annette Gerritsen	(Netherlands)	28	–	28	–	56
17	Yukari Watanabe	(Japan)	21	16	18	–	55
18	Sayuri Yoshii	(Japan)	16	21	14	–	51
19	Gabriele Hirschbichler	(Germany)	–	36	4	–	40
20	Paulina Wallin	(Sweden)	–	–	36	–	36
21	Margot Boer	(Netherlands)	16	10	8	–	34
22	Monique Angermüller	(Germany)	12	14	8	–	34
23	Mayon Kuipers	(Netherlands)	–	–	32	–	32
24	Marianne Timmer	(Netherlands)	18	–	–	–	18
25	Anzhelika Kotyuga	(Belarus)	5	8	3	–	16
26	Lee Bo-ra	(South Korea)	8	6	–	–	14
27	Christine Nesbitt	(Canada)	–	12	–	–	12
28	Anna Badayeva	(Belarus)	2	5	–	–	7
29	Yekaterina Malysheva	(Russia)	2	2	3	–	7
30	Kim Weger	(Canada)	–	–	5	–	5
31	Elli Ochowicz	(United States)	–	4	–	–	4
32	Shannon Rempel	(Canada)	4	–	–	–	4
33	Natasja Bruintjes	(Netherlands)	–	–	3	–	3
34	Nao Kodaira	(Japan)	–	1	–	–	1
