= 2008–09 ISU Speed Skating World Cup – Women's 3000 and 5000 metres =

The 3000 and 5000 metres distances for women in the 2008–09 ISU Speed Skating World Cup were contested over six races on six occasions, out of a total of nine World Cup occasions for the season, with the first occasion taking place in Berlin, Germany, on 7–9 November 2008, and the final occasion taking place in Salt Lake City, United States, on 6–7 March 2009.

Martina Sáblíková of the Czech Republic successfully defended her title from the previous season, while Daniela Anschütz-Thoms of Germany came second, and Kristina Groves of Canada came third.

== Top three ==
| Medal | Athlete | Points | Previous season |
|---|---|---|---|
| Gold | (Czech Republic) Martina Sáblíková | 610 | 1st |
| Silver | (Germany) Daniela Anschütz-Thoms | 375 | 5th |
| Bronze | (Canada) Kristina Groves | 375 | 4th |

== Race medallists ==
| Occasion # | Location | Date | Distance | Gold | Time | Silver | Time | Bronze | Time | Report |
|---|---|---|---|---|---|---|---|---|---|---|
| 1 | Berlin, Germany | 8 November | 3000 metres | Martina Sáblíková; Czech Republic | 4:03.70 | Daniela Anschütz-Thoms; Germany | 4:07.08 | Masako Hozumi; Japan | 4:07.92 | |
| 2 | Heerenveen, Netherlands | 14 November | 3000 metres | Renate Groenewold; Netherlands | 4:04.85 | Martina Sáblíková; Czech Republic | 4:05.54 | Diane Valkenburg; Netherlands | 4:05.70 | |
| 3 | Moscow, Russia | 22 November | 5000 metres | Claudia Pechstein; Germany | 6:49.92 | Martina Sáblíková; Czech Republic | 6:57.18 | Stephanie Beckert; Germany | 7:01.72 | |
| 7 | Erfurt, Germany | 31 January | 3000 metres | Martina Sáblíková; Czech Republic | 4:03.65 | Daniela Anschütz-Thoms; Germany | 4:05.14 | Renate Groenewold; Netherlands | 4:06.60 | |
| 8 | Heerenveen, Netherlands | 15 February | 5000 metres | Martina Sáblíková; Czech Republic | 6:59.08 | Stephanie Beckert; Germany | 7:01.33 | Kristina Groves; Canada | 7:05.08 | |
| 9 | Salt Lake City, United States | 6 March | 3000 metres | Martina Sáblíková; Czech Republic | 3:58.62 | Daniela Anschütz-Thoms; Germany | 3:59.88 | Kristina Groves; Canada | 4:00.00 | |

== Final standings ==
Standings as of 7 March 2009 (end of the season).

| # | Name | Nat. | BER | HVN1 | MOS | ERF | HVN2 | SLC | Total |
|---|---|---|---|---|---|---|---|---|---|
| 1 | Martina Sáblíková | (Czech Republic) | 100 | 80 | 80 | 100 | 100 | 150 | 610 |
| 2 | Daniela Anschütz-Thoms | (Germany) | 80 | 50 | 45 | 80 | – | 120 | 375 |
| 3 | Kristina Groves | (Canada) | 60 | 40 | 60 | 40 | 70 | 105 | 375 |
| 4 | Stephanie Beckert | (Germany) | 32 | 36 | 70 | 32 | 80 | 90 | 340 |
| 5 | Renate Groenewold | (Netherlands) | 45 | 100 | – | 70 | 45 | 45 | 305 |
| 6 | Claudia Pechstein | (Germany) | 50 | 60 | 100 | 45 | – | – | 255 |
| 7 | Masako Hozumi | (Japan) | 70 | 0 | 40 | 50 | 50 | 28 | 238 |
| 8 | Jorien Voorhuis | (Netherlands) | 18 | 32 | – | 60 | 40 | 75 | 225 |
| 9 | Maren Haugli | (Norway) | 25 | 18 | 35 | 21 | 60 | 36 | 195 |
| 10 | Diane Valkenburg | (Netherlands) | 40 | 70 | – | 36 | 25 | 18 | 189 |
| 11 | Brittany Schussler | (Canada) | 36 | 21 | 20 | 28 | 35 | 40 | 180 |
| 12 | Clara Hughes | (Canada) | 28 | 45 | 50 | 18 | – | 32 | 173 |
| 13 | Elma de Vries | (Netherlands) | 21 | – | 21 | – | 35 | 21 | 98 |
| 14 | Gretha Smit | (Netherlands) | 24 | 10 | 30 | – | 30 | – | 94 |
| 15 | Katarzyna Wójcicka | (Poland) | 10 | 25 | 15 | 14 | 15 | 14 | 93 |
| 16 | Shiho Ishizawa | (Japan) | 5 | 0 | 35 | 5 | 21 | 12 | 78 |
| 17 | Hiromi Otsu | (Japan) | 8 | 0 | 30 | 12 | 20 | 8 | 78 |
| 18 | Christine Nesbitt | (Canada) | 12 | 24 | 25 | 16 | – | – | 77 |
| 19 | Lucille Opitz | (Germany) | 16 | 16 | – | – | 18 | 24 | 74 |
| 20 | Nancy Swider-Peltz, Jr | (United States) | 6 | 8 | – | 19 | 30 | 10 | 73 |
| 21 | Catherine Raney | (United States) | 19 | 14 | 8 | 8 | 7 | 16 | 72 |
| 22 | Paulien van Deutekom | (Netherlands) | – | 28 | – | 24 | – | – | 52 |
| 23 | Eriko Ishino | (Japan) | – | – | 25 | 6 | 11 | 6 | 48 |
| 24 | Katrin Mattscherodt | (Germany) | 14 | 6 | 18 | – | 9 | – | 47 |
| 25 | Lee Ju-yeon | (South Korea) | 15 | 12 | 9 | – | – | – | 36 |
| 26 | Noh Seon-yeong | (South Korea) | 8 | 19 | 5 | – | – | – | 32 |
| 27 | Fu Chunyan | (China) | 3 | 15 | 4 | 10 | – | – | 32 |
| 28 | Park Do-yeong | (South Korea) | 11 | 8 | 13 | – | – | – | 32 |
| 29 | Anna Rokita | (Austria) | 4 | 6 | 7 | – | 13 | – | 30 |
| 30 | Maki Tabata | (Japan) | 0 | 0 | – | – | 25 | – | 25 |
| 31 | Lisette van der Geest | (Netherlands) | – | – | 0 | 25 | – | – | 25 |
| 32 | Svetlana Vysokova | (Russia) | – | – | 10 | 15 | – | – | 25 |
| 33 | Nicole Garrido | (Canada) | 0 | 0 | 6 | – | 15 | – | 21 |
| 34 | Galina Likhachova | (Russia) | 6 | 11 | 1 | – | – | – | 18 |
| 35 | Luiza Złotkowska | (Poland) | 0 | 0 | – | 8 | 10 | – | 18 |
| 36 | Marja Vis | (Netherlands) | – | – | 15 | – | – | – | 15 |
| 37 | Isabell Ost | (Germany) | – | – | – | 11 | 4 | – | 15 |
| 38 | Andrea Jirků | (Czech Republic) | 1 | 2 | 0 | 4 | 8 | – | 15 |
| 39 | Alexandra Lipp | (Germany) | – | – | – | 6 | 6 | – | 12 |
| 40 | Annouk van der Weijden | (Netherlands) | – | – | 11 | – | – | – | 11 |
| 41 | Maria Lamb | (United States) | 0 | 0 | – | 2 | 5 | – | 7 |
| 42 | Risa Takayama | (Japan) | 2 | 4 | – | – | – | – | 6 |
| 43 | Dong Feifei | (China) | 2 | 0 | 3 | 1 | – | – | 6 |
| 44 | Xu Jinjin | (China) | 4 | 0 | 0 | – | – | – | 4 |
| 45 | Cathrine Grage | (Denmark) | 0 | 0 | 0 | 0 | 3 | – | 3 |
| 46 | Andrea Lazarescu | (Romania) | 0 | 0 | 0 | 0 | 2 | – | 2 |
| 47 | Gao Yang | (China) | 0 | 0 | 2 | 0 | – | – | 2 |
| 48 | Daniela Oltean | (Romania) | 0 | 1 | 0 | 0 | – | – | 1 |
