= 2008–09 ISU Speed Skating World Cup – Men's 100 metres =

The 100 metres distance for men in the 2008–09 ISU Speed Skating World Cup was contested over four races on four occasions, out of a total of nine World Cup occasions for the season, with the first occasion involving the distance taking place in Changchun, China, on 6–7 December 2008, and the final occasion taking place in Salt Lake City, United States, on 6–7 March 2009.

Yūya Oikawa of Japan won the cup, while Yu Fengtong of China came second, and the defending champion, Lee Kang-seok of South Korea, had to settle for third place.

== Top three ==
Medal	Athlete	Points	Previous season
Gold	(Japan) Yūya Oikawa	450	–
Silver	(China) Yu Fengtong	305	9th
Bronze	(South Korea) Lee Kang-seok	270	1st

== Race medallists ==
Occasion #	Location	Date	Gold	Time	Silver	Time	Bronze	Time	Report
4	Changchun, China	7 December	Yūya Oikawa; Japan	9.45	Lee Kang-seok; South Korea	9.61	Yu Fengtong; China	9.89	
5	Nagano, Japan	14 December	Yūya Oikawa; Japan	9.60	Yu Fengtong; China	9.79	Lee Kang-seok; South Korea	9.85	
6	Kolomna, Russia	25 January	Yūya Oikawa; Japan	9.61	Joji Kato; Japan	9.66	Zhang Zhongqi; China	9.81	
9	Salt Lake City, United States	7 March	Yūya Oikawa; Japan	9.49	Lee Kang-seok; South Korea	9.63	Yu Fengtong; China	9.80	

== Final standings ==
Standings as of 8 March 2009 (end of the season).

#	Name	Nat.	CHA	NAG	KOL	SLC	Total
1	Yūya Oikawa	(Japan)	100	100	100	150	450
2	Yu Fengtong	(China)	70	80	50	105	305
3	Lee Kang-seok	(South Korea)	80	70		120	270
4	Mika Poutala	(Finland)	50	60	32	90	232
5	Zhang Zhongqi	(China)	60	45	70	45	220
6	Zhang Yaolin	(China)	45	14	60	75	194
7	Joji Kato	(Japan)	18	32	80		130
8	Jamie Gregg	(Canada)	36	50	18		104
9	Keiichiro Nagashima	(Japan)	28	36	24		88
10	Muncef Ouardi	(Canada)	40	8	36		84
11	Tadashi Obara	(Japan)	21	40	21		82
12	Jan Smeekens	(Netherlands)	14	16	45		75
13	Tucker Fredricks	(United States)		21	28		49
14	Matthias Schwierz	(Germany)	8		40		48
15	Lee Kyou-hyuk	(South Korea)	24	24			48
16	Nan Minghao	(China)	32	10			42
17	Pekka Koskela	(Finland)		28			28
18	Dmitry Lobkov	(Russia)		18	8		26
19	Simon Kuipers	(Netherlands)	12		14		26
20	Mo Tae-bum	(South Korea)	12	12			24
21	Sergey Chadayev	(Russia)	2	3	12		17
22	Markus Puolakka	(Finland)			16		16
23	Hiroyasu Shimizu	(Japan)	16				16
24	Ermanno Ioriatti	(Italy)			10		10
25	Mark Tuitert	(Netherlands)	4		6		10
26	Pasi Koskela	(Finland)	5	5			10
27	Liu Fangyi	(China)	8				8
28	Mike Blumel	(United States)		6	2		8
29	Vincent Labrie	(Canada)			6		6
30	Kyle Parrott	(Canada)		4			4
30	Aleksey Yesin	(Russia)			4		4
30	Maciej Ustynowicz	(Poland)			4		4
33	Nico Ihle	(Germany)		3			3
33	Tuomas Nieminen	(Finland)	3				3
35	Lee Ki-ho	(South Korea)	2				2
35	Beorn Nijenhuis	(Netherlands)			2		2
37	Christopher Needham	(United States)		1			1
