= 2008–09 ISU Speed Skating World Cup – Women's team pursuit =

The women's team pursuit in the 2008–09 ISU Speed Skating World Cup was contested over three races on three occasions, out of a total of nine World Cup occasions for the season, with the first occasion taking place in Berlin, Germany, on 7–9 November 2008, and the last occasion involving the event taking place in Erfurt, Germany, on 30 January – 1 February 2009.

The Czech Republic won the cup, while the United States came second, and the Netherlands came third. The defending champions, Canada, ended up in eighth place.

== Top three ==
Medal	Country	Points	Previous season
Gold	Czech Republic	235	–
Silver	United States	205	7th
Bronze	Netherlands	200	6th

== Race medallists ==
Occasion #	Date	Location	Gold	Time	Silver	Time	Bronze	Time	Report
1	Berlin, Germany	9 November	Netherlands; Renate Groenewold; Ireen Wüst; Diane Valkenburg	3:04.34	Germany; Daniela Anschütz-Thoms; Claudia Pechstein; Lucille Opitz	3:04.51	United States; Nancy Swider-Peltz, Jr; Catherine Raney; Mia Manganello	3:05.68	
2	Heerenveen, Netherlands	16 November	Netherlands; Renate Groenewold; Marrit Leenstra; Ireen Wüst	3:01.32	Canada; Kristina Groves; Christine Nesbitt; Brittany Schussler	3:02.34	Germany; Daniela Anschütz-Thoms; Lucille Opitz; Claudia Pechstein	3:02.51	
7	Erfurt, Germany	1 February	Czech Republic; Karolína Erbanová; Andrea Jirků; Martina Sáblíková	3:05.32	Russia; Galina Likhachova; Alla Shabanova; Yekaterina Shikhova	3:05.80	Poland; Natalia Czerwonka; Katarzyna Wójcicka; Luiza Złotkowska	3:06.26	

== Final standings ==
Standings as of 1 February 2009 (end of the season).

#	Nation	BER	HVN	ERF	Total
1st place, gold medalist(s)	Czech Republic	45	40	150	235
2nd place, silver medalist(s)	United States	70	60	75	205
3rd place, bronze medalist(s)	Netherlands	100	100	0	200
4	Germany	80	70	40	190
5	Poland	32	36	105	173
6	Japan	36	45	90	171
7	Russia	28	0	120	148
8	Canada	50	80	–	130
9	China	40	32	45	117
10	South Korea	60	50	–	110
11	Romania	24	24	36	84
12	Belarus	21	21	–	42
13	Norway	–	28	–	28
