= 2008–09 ISU Speed Skating World Cup – Men's team pursuit =

The men's team pursuit in the 2008–09 ISU Speed Skating World Cup was contested over three races on three occasions, out of a total of nine World Cup occasions for the season, with the first occasion taking place in Berlin, Germany, on 7–9 November 2008, and the last occasion involving the event taking place in Erfurt, Germany, on 30 January – 1 February 2009.

Canada won the cup, while Italy came second, and Japan came third. The defending champions, the Netherlands, ended up in seventh place.

== Top three ==
Medal	Country	Points	Previous season
Gold	Canada	310	2nd
Silver	Italy	220	7th
Bronze	Japan	210	9th

== Race medallists ==
Occasion #	Location	Date	Gold	Time	Silver	Time	Bronze	Time	Report
1	Berlin, Germany	9 November	Canada; Denny Morrison; Lucas Makowsky; Steven Elm	3:47.29	Germany; Jörg Dallmann; Robert Lehmann; Marco Weber	3:47.37	Japan; Teruhiro Sugimori; Hiroki Hirako; Shigeyuki Dejima	3:48.02	
2	Heerenveen, Netherlands	16 November	Netherlands; Sven Kramer; Simon Kuipers; Carl Verheijen	3:42.29	United States; Shani Davis; Chad Hedrick; Trevor Marsicano	3:43.48	Sweden; Joel Eriksson; Daniel Friberg; Johan Röjler	3:47.20	
7	Erfurt, Germany	1 February	Canada; Denny Morrison; Lucas Makowsky; Jay Morrison	3:46.03	Italy; Matteo Anesi; Enrico Fabris; Luca Stefani	3:46.56	Norway; Håvard Bøkko; Sverre Haugli; Stian Elvenes	3:48.39	

== Final standings ==
Standings as of 1 February 2009 (end of the season).

#	Nation	BER	HVN1	ERF	Total
1st place, gold medalist(s)	Canada	100	60	150	310
2nd place, silver medalist(s)	Italy	60	40	120	220
3rd place, bronze medalist(s)	Japan	70	50	90	210
4	Germany	80	16	75	171
5	United States	45	80	45	170
6	Norway	–	45	105	150
7	Netherlands	0	100	40	140
8	Sweden	32	70	28	130
9	Poland	50	32	36	118
10	Russia	40	36	32	108
11	Romania	24	21	21	66
12	South Korea	36	28	–	64
13	Czech Republic	21	18	24	63
14	China	28	0	–	28
15	France	–	24	–	24
16	Kazakhstan	–	–	18	18
