= Ren Hui =

Chinese speed skater

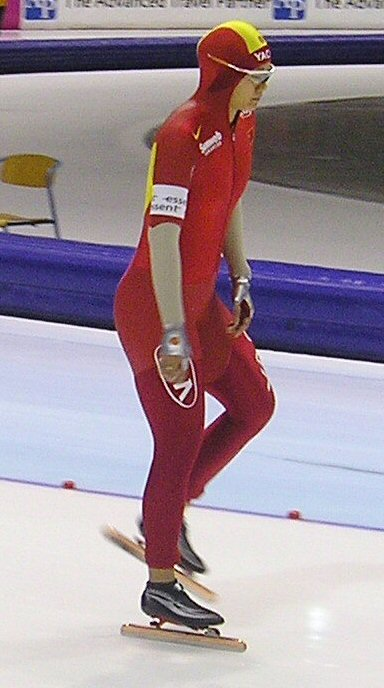
- Ren in 2006

Personal information
- Born: 11 August 1983 (age 42) Yichun, Heilongjiang, China

Sport
- Country: China
- Sport: Speed skating
Medal record
Women's speed skating
Olympic Games
Bronze medal – third place	2006 Turin	500 m
World Championships
Bronze medal – third place	2004 Seoul	500 m

Ren Hui (Chinese: 任慧; pinyin: Rén Huì; born 11 August 1983) is a Chinese speed skater who won a bronze medal in the Women's 500 m at the 2006 Winter Olympics and bronze at the World Single Distance Championships for Women.

== Records ==
Personal records
Women's speedskating
Event	Result	Date	Location	Notes
500 m	38.01	2007-11-10	Salt Lake City, Utah	
1000 m	1:15.39	2007-11-11	Salt Lake City, Utah	
1500 m	2:05.16	2005-01-13	Innsbruck, Austria	
3000 m	4:57.35	1999-02-09	Heihe, China	

== Competitions ==
Olympic Games

- 2006 Winter Olympics – Women's 500 metres
- 2006 Winter Olympics – Women's 1000 metres
- 2010 Winter Olympics – Women's 1000 metres

World Single Distance Speed Skating Championships

- 2004 World Single Distance Speed Skating Championships – 500 m

World Sprint Speed Skating Championships

- 2010 World Sprint Speed Skating Championships

ISU Speed Skating World Cup

- 2006–07 ISU Speed Skating World Cup
- 2007–08 ISU Speed Skating World Cup
- 2008–09 ISU Speed Skating World Cup – Women's 100 metres
- 2008–09 ISU Speed Skating World Cup – Women's 500 metres
- 2008–09 ISU Speed Skating World Cup – Women's 1000 metres
- 2009–10 ISU Speed Skating World Cup – Women's 500 metres
- 2009–10 ISU Speed Skating World Cup – Women's 1000 metres

Asian Winter Games

- 2007 Asian Winter Games – 1000 m

== See also ==
- China at the 2006 Winter Olympics
- China at the 2010 Winter Olympics
