= 2008–09 ISU Speed Skating World Cup – World Cup 8 =

The eighth competition weekend of the 2008–09 ISU Speed Skating World Cup was a two-day event focusing on allround-events, held in Thialf, Heerenveen, Netherlands, from Saturday, 14 February, until Sunday, 15 February 2009.

== Schedule of events ==
The schedule of the event is not yet communicated but the distances are already announced:

- 1500 m (men and women)
- 5000 m (women)
- 10000 m (men)

== Medal winners ==
=== Men's events ===
Event	Gold	Time	Silver	Time	Bronze	Time	Report
1500 m	Shani Davis; United States	1:45.40	Enrico Fabris; Italy	1:45.88	Trevor Marsicano; United States	1:46.09	
10000 m	Sven Kramer; Netherlands	13:03.51	Håvard Bøkko; Norway	13:07.93	Bob de Jong; Netherlands	13:09.16	

=== Women's events ===
Event	Gold	Time	Silver	Time	Bronze	Time	Report
1500 m	Anni Friesinger; Germany	1:57.48	Christine Nesbitt; Canada	1:57.58	Kristina Groves; Canada	1:58.40	
5000 m	Martina Sáblíková; Czech Republic	6:59.08	Stephanie Beckert; Germany	7:01.33	Kristina Groves; Canada	7:05.08	
