= 2008–09 ISU Speed Skating World Cup – World Cup 5 =

The fifth competition weekend of the 2008–09 ISU Speed Skating World Cup was a two-day event focusing on the shorter distances, held at the M-Wave arena in Nagano, Japan, from Saturday, 13 December, until Sunday, 14 December 2008. It was the second and last World Cup in Asia of this season.

== Schedule of events ==
The schedule of the event is stands below.

Date	Time	Events
13 December	14:00 JST	500 m women 500 m men 1000 m women 1000 m men
14 December	14:00 JST	500 m women 500 m men 1000 m women 1000 m men 100 m women 100 m men

== Medal winners ==
=== Men's events ===
Event	Race #	Gold	Time	Silver	Time	Bronze	Time	Report
100 m		Yuya Oikawa; Japan	9.60	Yu Fengtong; China	9.79	Lee Kang-seok; South Korea	9.85	
500 m	1	Keiichiro Nagashima; Japan	34.81	Yu Fengtong; China	34.91	Joji Kato; Japan	35.06	
500 m	2	Lee Kyou-hyuk; South Korea	34.92	Yu Fengtong; China	34.95	Joji Kato; Japan	34.96	
1000 m	1	Shani Davis; United States	1:09.21	Denny Morrison; Canada	1:09.40	Lee Kyou-hyuk; South Korea	1:09.43	
1000 m	2	Shani Davis; United States	1:08.92	Lee Kyou-hyuk; South Korea	1:09.16	Denny Morrison; Canada	1:09.23	

=== Women's events ===
Event	Race #	Gold	Time	Silver	Time	Bronze	Time	Report
100 m		Jenny Wolf; Germany	10.40	Xing Aihua; China	10.42	Sayuri Osuga; Japan	10.81	
500 m	1	Jenny Wolf; Germany	37.71	Lee Sang-hwa; South Korea	38.39	Sayuri Yoshii; Japan	38.66	
500 m	2	Yu Jing; China	38.63	Lee Sang-hwa; South Korea	38.72	Xing Aihua; China	38.78	
1000 m	1	Jennifer Rodriguez; United States	1:16.34	Christine Nesbitt; Canada	1:16.39	Kristina Groves; Canada	1:16.65	
1000 m	2	Christine Nesbitt; Canada	1:16.38	Yu Jing; China	1:17.37	Jin Peiyu; China	1:17.60	
