= Timofey Skopin =

Russian speed skater

Personal information
- Nationality: Russian
- Born: 5 April 1989 (age 35); Kirov, Russia

Sport
- Sport: Speed skating

Timofey Skopin (born 5 April 1989) is a Russian speed skater. He competed in the men's 500 metres event at the 2010 Winter Olympics.
