= 2008–09 ISU Speed Skating World Cup – World Cup 3 =

The third competition weekend of the 2008–09 ISU Speed Skating World Cup was held at the Krylatskoye ice rink in Moscow, Russia, from Saturday, 22 November, until Sunday, 23 November 2008.

== Schedule of events ==
The schedule of the event is below.

Date	Time	Events
22 November	14:00 MST	1500 m men 5000 m women
23 November	13:00 MST	1500 m women 10000 m men

== Medal summary ==
=== Men's events ===
Event	Gold	Time	Silver	Time	Bronze	Time	Report
1500 m	Håvard Bøkko; Norway	1:45.46	Mark Tuitert; Netherlands	1:45.81	Enrico Fabris; Italy	1:46.00	
10000 m	Bob de Jong; Netherlands	12:59.21	Håvard Bøkko; Norway	13:00.65	Enrico Fabris; Italy	13:11.98	

=== Women's events ===
Event	Gold	Time	Silver	Time	Bronze	Time	Report
1500 m	Claudia Pechstein; Germany	1:55.96	Christine Nesbitt; Canada	1:56.40	Kristina Groves; Canada	1:56.76	
5000 m	Claudia Pechstein; Germany	6:49.92	Martina Sáblíková; Czech Republic	6:57.18	Stephanie Beckert; Germany	7:01.72	
