= 2008–09 ISU Speed Skating World Cup – World Cup 1 =

The first competition weekend of the 2008–09 ISU Speed Skating World Cup was held in the Sportforum Hohenschönhausen in Berlin, Germany, from Friday, 7 November, until Sunday, 9 November 2008.

== Schedule of events ==
Schedule of the event:

| Date | Time | Events |
|---|---|---|
| 7 November | 15:00 CET | 500 m women 500 m men 1500 m women 5000 m men |
| 8 November | 13:30 CET | 500 m women 500 m men 3000 m women 1500 m men |
| 9 November | 13:30 CET | 1000 m women 1000 m men Team pursuit women Team pursuit men |

== Medal summary ==
=== Men's events ===
| Event | Race # | Gold | Time | Silver | Time | Bronze | Time | Report |
|---|---|---|---|---|---|---|---|---|
| 500 m | 1 | Keiichiro Nagashima; Japan | 34.92 | Pekka Koskela; Finland | 34.99 | Lee Kyou-hyuk; South Korea | 35.01 | |
| 500 m | 2 | Joji Kato; Japan | 34.70 | Yu Fengtong; China | 35.07 | Mika Poutala; Finland | 35.13 | |
| 1000 m | | Stefan Groothuis; Netherlands | 1:09.13 | Shani Davis; United States | 1:09.15 | Simon Kuipers; Netherlands | 1:09.30 | |
| 1500 m | | Sven Kramer; Netherlands | 1:45.69 | Erben Wennemars; Netherlands | 1:45.85 | Simon Kuipers; Netherlands | 1:45.95 | |
| 5000 m | | Sven Kramer; Netherlands | 6:15.74 | Håvard Bøkko; Norway | 6:20.03 | Carl Verheijen; Netherlands | 6:20.87 | |
| Team pursuit | | Canada; Denny Morrison; Lucas Makowsky; Steven Elm | 3:47.29 | Germany; Jörg Dallmann; Robert Lehmann; Marco Weber | 3:47.37 | Japan; Teruhiro Sugimori; Hiroki Hirako; Shigeyuki Dejima | 3:48.02 | |

=== Women's events ===
| Event | Race # | Gold | Time | Silver | Time | Bronze | Time | Report |
|---|---|---|---|---|---|---|---|---|
| 500 m | 1 | Jenny Wolf; Germany | 37.75 | Wang Beixing; China | 37.75 | Lee Sang-hwa; South Korea | 38.12 | |
| 500 m | 2 | Wang Beixing; China | 37.91 | Jenny Wolf; Germany | 37.95 | Lee Sang-hwa; South Korea | 38.26 | |
| 1000 m | | Christine Nesbitt; Canada | 1:16.86 | Shannon Rempel; Canada | 1:17.11 | Laurine van Riessen; Netherlands | 1:17.21 | |
| 1500 m | | Kristina Groves; Canada | 1:57.65 | Brittany Schussler; Canada | 1:57.74 | Shannon Rempel; Canada | 1:58.04 | |
| 3000 m | | Martina Sáblíková; Czech Republic | 4:03.70 | Daniela Anschütz-Thoms; Germany | 4:07.08 | Masako Hozumi; Japan | 4:07.92 | |
| Team pursuit | | Netherlands; Renate Groenewold; Ireen Wüst; Diane Valkenburg | 3:04.34 | Germany; Daniela Anschütz-Thoms; Claudia Pechstein; Lucille Opitz | 3:04.51 | United States; Nancy Swider-Peltz, Jr; Catherine Raney; Mia Manganello | 3:05.68 | |
