= Katrin Mattscherodt =

German speed skater

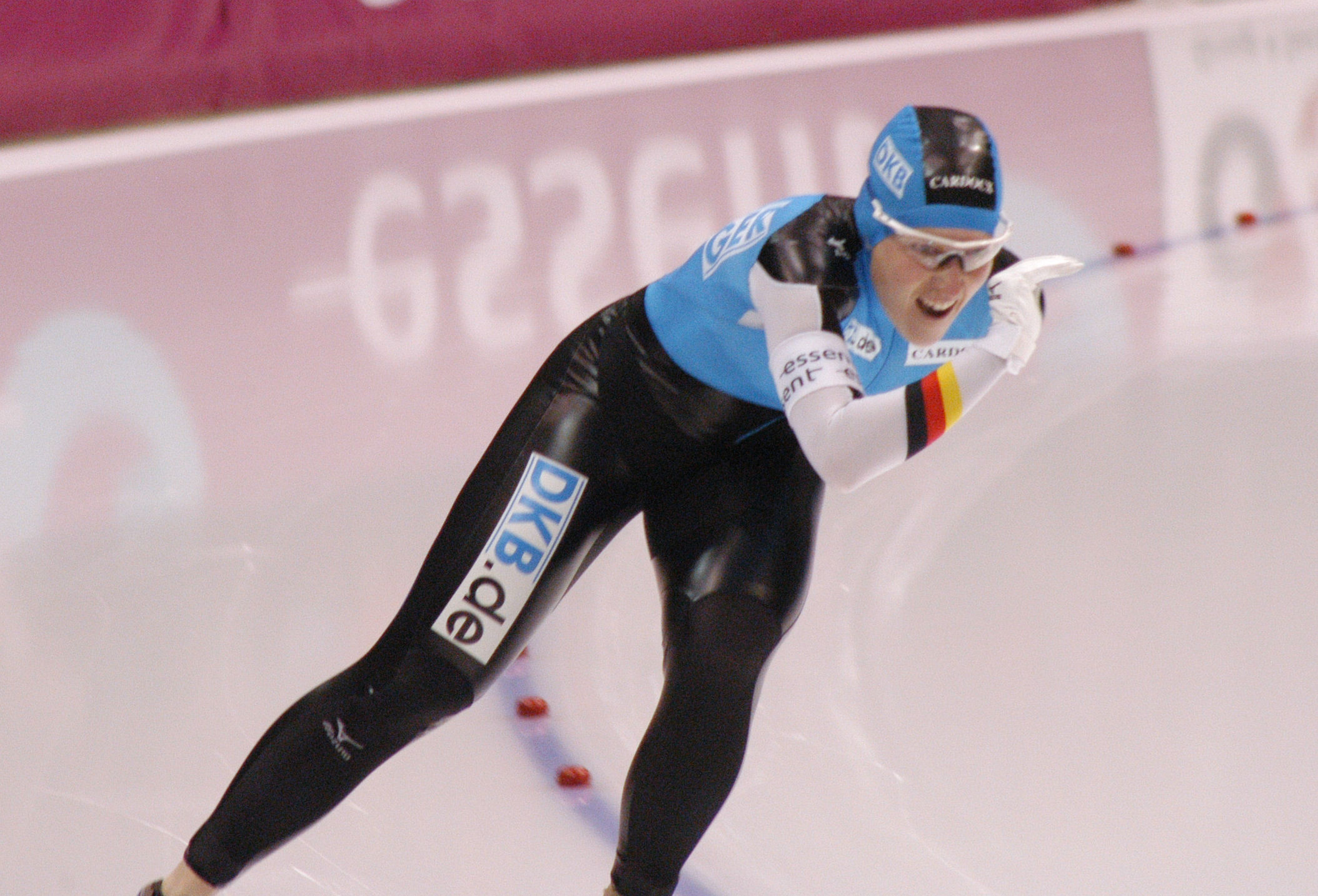

Personal information
- Born: 26 October 1981 (age 44) Berlin, East Germany

Sport
- Country: Germany
- Sport: Speed skating
Medal record
Representing Germany
Women's speed skating
Olympic Games
Gold medal – first place	2010 Vancouver	Team pursuit

Katrin Mattscherodt (born 26 October 1981) is a German long track speed skater who participates in international competitions. In the team pursuit final against Japan at the 2010 Vancouver Winter Olympics, she was a replacement for Anni Friesinger-Postma in the final (after Friesinger-Postma had problems finishing in the semifinal), and won a gold medal as part of the German team.

== Personal records ==
Personal records
Women's Speed skating
Event	Result	Date	Location	Notes
500 m	41.28	2008-01-12	Kolomna	
1000 m	1:20.52	2007-02-24	Calgary	
1500 m	1:59.12	2007-11-10	Salt Lake City	
3000 m	4:05.32	2007-11-16	Calgary	
5000 m	7:06.29	2007-12-01	Kolomna	

=== Career highlights ===
European Allround Championships
2006 - Hamar, 17th
2007 - Collalbo, 14th
2008 - Kolomna, 9th
National Championships
2005 - Berlin, (bronze) 3rd at 3000 m
2005 - Berlin, (silver) 2nd at 5000 m
2006 - Berlin, (silver) 2nd at 5000 m
2006 - Erfurt, (bronze) 3rd at allround
2007 - Erfurt, (silver) 2nd at 3000 m
2007 - Erfurt, (bronze) 3rd at 1500 m
2007 - Erfurt, (silver) 2nd at 5000 m
2008 - Inzell, (bronze) 3rd at 500 m allround
2008 - Inzell, (gold) 1st at 1500 m allround
2008 - Inzell, (bronze) 3rd at 1000 m allround
2008 - Inzell, (gold) 1st at 3000 m allround
Nordic Neo-Senior Games
2003 - Warsaw, (silver) 2nd at 3000 m
2003 - Warsaw, (silver) 2nd at 1500 m
2003 - Warsaw, (gold) 1st at 5000 m
European Youth-23 Games
2004 - Gothenburg, (bronze) 3rd at 3000 m
2004 - Gothenburg, (bronze) 3rd at 1500 m
2004 - Gothenburg, (silver) 2nd at 5000 m
2005 - Helsinki, (silver) 2nd at 3000 m
2005 - Helsinki, (silver) 2nd at 1500 m
2005 - Helsinki, (gold) 1st at 5000 m
