= 2008–09 ISU Speed Skating World Cup – World Cup 4 =

The fourth competition weekend of the 2008–09 ISU Speed Skating World Cup was a two-day event focusing on the shorter distances, held at the Jilin Provincial Speed Skating Rink in Changchun, China, from Saturday, 6 December, until Sunday, 7 December 2008. It was the first World Cup competition at this rink, which was also used during the 2007 Asian Winter Games.

== Schedule of events ==
The schedule of the event is below.

Date	Time	Events
6 December	14:00 UTC+8	500 m women 500 m men 1000 m women 1000 m men
7 December	14:00 UTC+8	500 m women 500 m men 1000 m women 1000 m men 100 m women 100 m men

== Medal winners ==
=== Men's events ===
Event	Race #	Gold	Time	Silver	Time	Bronze	Time	Report
100 m		Yuya Oikawa; Japan	9.45	Lee Kang-seok; South Korea	9.61	Yu Fengtong; China	9.89	
500 m	1	Yu Fengtong; China	34.97	Keiichiro Nagashima; Japan	35.08	Lee Kyou-hyuk; South Korea	35.27	
500 m	2	Dmitry Lobkov; Russia	35.07	Yu Fengtong; China	35.09	Keiichiro Nagashima; Japan	35.20	
1000 m	1	Lee Kyou-hyuk; South Korea	1:09.68	Stefan Groothuis; Netherlands	1:10.15	Shani Davis; United States	1:10.32	
1000 m	2	Simon Kuipers; Netherlands	1:09.83	Shani Davis; United States	1:09.99	Stefan Groothuis; Netherlands	1:10.01	

=== Women's events ===
Event	Race #	Gold	Time	Silver	Time	Bronze	Time	Report
100 m		Jenny Wolf; Germany	10.23	Xing Aihua; China	10.27	Lee Sang-hwa; South Korea	10.67	
500 m	1	Jenny Wolf; Germany	38.09	Lee Sang-hwa; South Korea	38.71	Annette Gerritsen; Netherlands	38.86	
500 m	2	Jenny Wolf; Germany	37.98	Annette Gerritsen; Netherlands	38.52	Lee Sang-hwa; South Korea	38.56	
1000 m	1	Kristina Groves; Canada	1:18.18	Shannon Rempel; Canada	1:18.20	Laurine van Riessen; Netherlands	1:18.48	
1000 m	2	Laurine van Riessen; Netherlands	1:17.25	Kristina Groves; Canada	1:17.80	Shannon Rempel; Canada	1:18.27	
