= François-Olivier Roberge =

Canadian speed skater (born 1985)

François-Olivier Roberge (born September 15, 1985 in Saint-Nicolas, Quebec) is a Canadian speed-skater who represented Canada at the 2006 and 2010 Winter Olympics.
