= Aleksandr Lebedev (speed skater) =

Russian speed skater

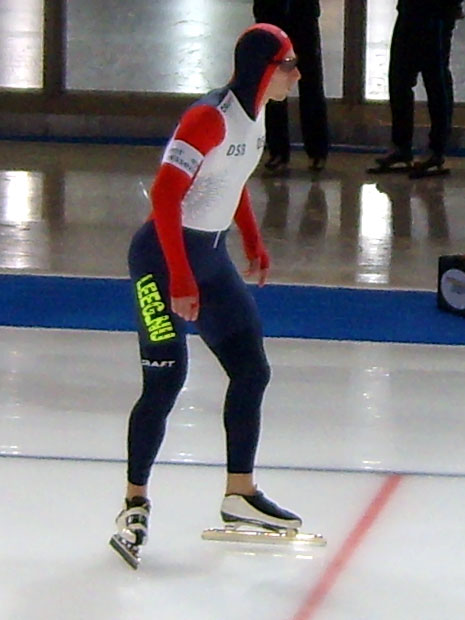
- Aleksandr Lebedev in 2008

Personal information
- Nationality: Russian
- Born: 29 May 1987 (age 37); Moscow, Russia

Sport
- Sport: Speed skating

Aleksandr Lebedev (born 29 May 1987) is a Russian speed skater. He competed in three events at the 2010 Winter Olympics.
