= Pasi Koskela =

Finnish speed skater

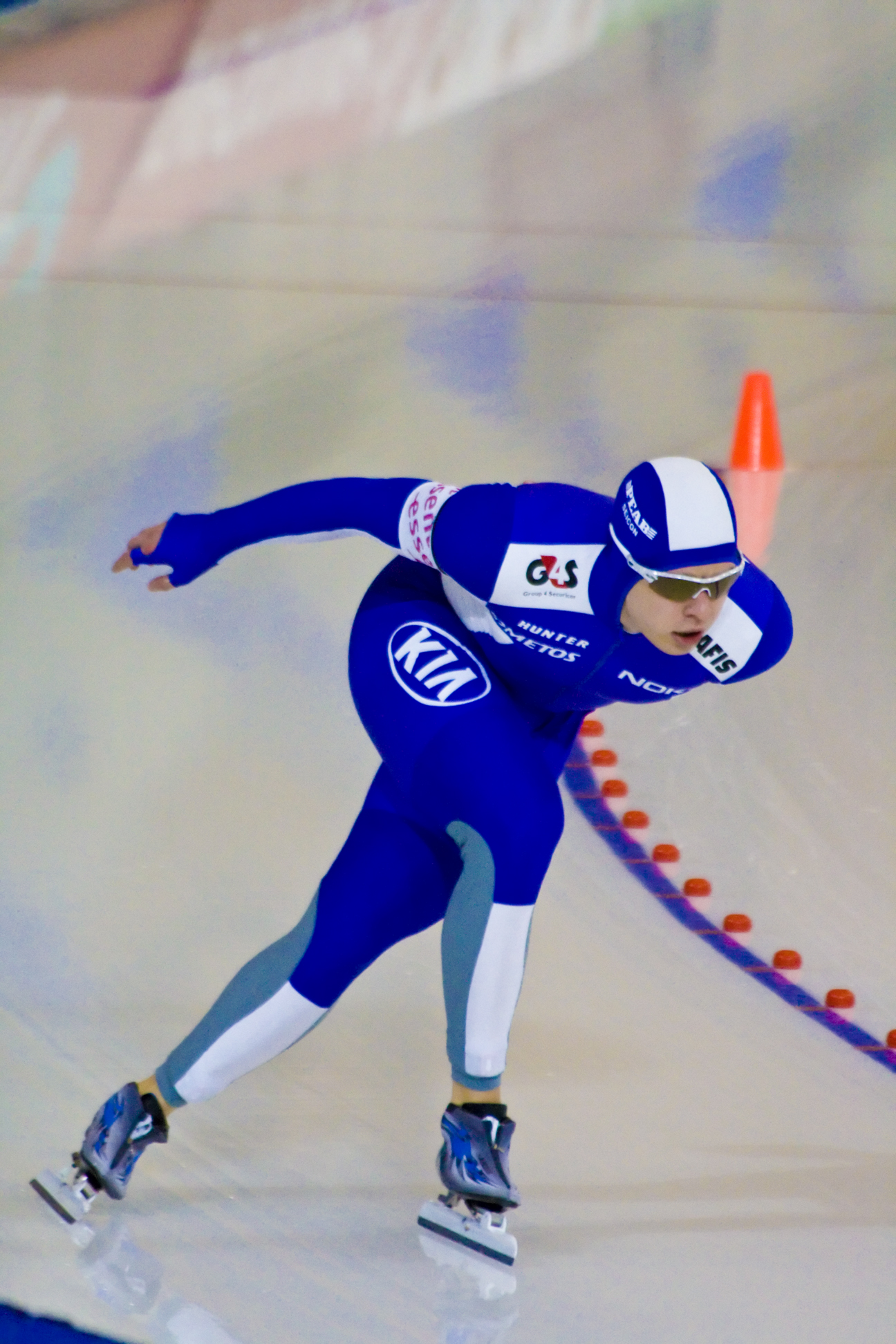

Pasi Koskela (born 28 August 1980) is a Finnish former speed skater. He was a member of the speed skating national team of Finland for many years, including the 2010 Winter Olympics in Vancouver. After his racing career, Pasi Koskela became head coach of Finland's national team in 2011.

Pasi is the brother of Pekka Koskela, who is one of the world's fastest speed skating sprinters. Pasi is also cousin to wrestler Harri Koskela.
