= Anzhelika Kotyuga =

Belarusian speed skater

Personal information
- Nationality: Belarusian
- Born: 26 May 1970 (age 56) Minsk, Soviet Union

Sport
- Sport: Speed skating

Anzhelika Kotyuga (born 26 May 1970) is a Belarusian speed skater. She competed at the 1998 Winter Olympics and the 2002 Winter Olympics.
