= 2008–09 ISU Speed Skating World Cup – World Cup 6 =

The sixth competition weekend of the 2008–09 ISU Speed Skating World Cup was a two-day event focusing on the shorter distances, held at the Kometa Ice Rink in Kolomna, Russia, from Saturday, 24 January, until Sunday, 25 January 2009.

== Schedule of events ==
The schedule of the event is below.

Date	Time	Events
24 January	14:30 MST	500 m women 500 m men 1000 m women 1000 m men
25 January	14:00 MST	500 m women 500 m men 1000 m women 1000 m men 100 m women 100 m men

== Medal winners ==
=== Men's events ===
Event	Race #	Gold	Time	Silver	Time	Bronze	Time	Report
100 m		Yuya Oikawa; Japan	9.61	Joji Kato; Japan	9.66	Zhang Zhongqi; China	9.81	
500 m	1	Keiichiro Nagashima; Japan	34.85	Yu Fengtong; China	34.89	Yuya Oikawa; Japan	34.96	
500 m	2	Tucker Fredricks; United States	34.81	Keiichiro Nagashima; Japan	34.87	Yu Fengtong; China	34.89	
1000 m	1	Denny Morrison; Canada	1:08.71	Stefan Groothuis; Netherlands	1:08.97	Yevgeny Lalenkov; Russia	1:09.02	
1000 m	2	Denny Morrison; Canada	1:08.53	Stefan Groothuis; Netherlands	1:08.67	Mark Tuitert; Netherlands	1:09.09	

=== Women's events ===
Event	Race #	Gold	Time	Silver	Time	Bronze	Time	Report
100 m		Jenny Wolf; Germany	10.33	Judith Hesse; Germany	10.56	Xing Aihua; China	10.59	
500 m	1	Jenny Wolf; Germany	37.51	Annette Gerritsen; Netherlands	38.02	Yu Jing; China	38.17	
500 m	2	Jenny Wolf; Germany	37.67	Jin Peiyu; China	38.01	Yu Jing; China	38.13	
1000 m	1	Margot Boer; Netherlands	1:15.84	Yu Jing; China	1:16.04	Christine Nesbitt; Canada	1:16.26	
1000 m	2	Margot Boer; Netherlands	1:15.79	Anni Friesinger; Germany	1:15.81	Christine Nesbitt; Canada	1:15.85	
