= Jan Friesinger =

German speed skater

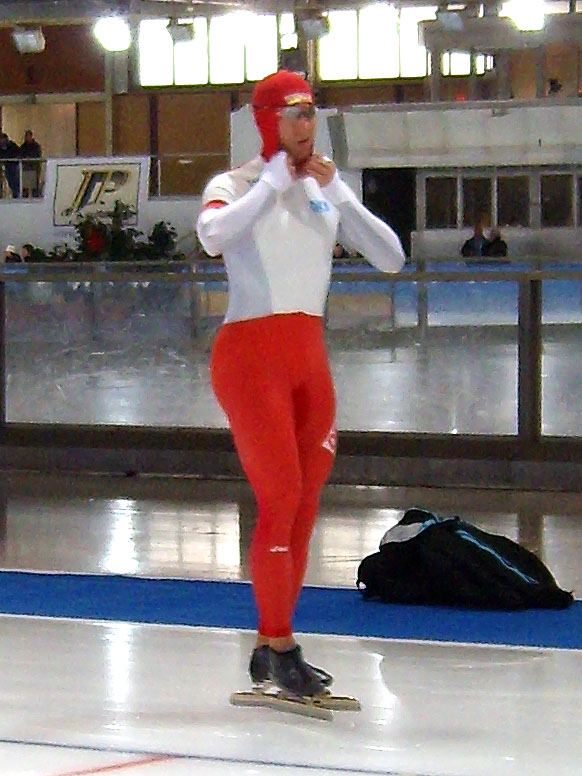
- Jan Friesinger in 2008

Personal information
- Nationality: German
- Born: 20 November 1980 (age 44); Bad Reichenhall, Germany

Sport
- Sport: Speed skating

Jan Friesinger (born 20 November 1980) is a German speed skater. He competed in three events at the 2002 Winter Olympics.
