= Tuomas Nieminen =

Finland speed skater

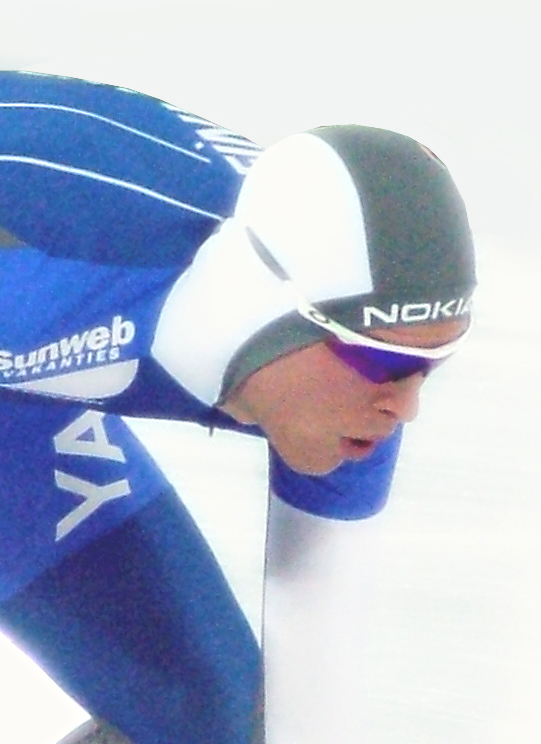
- 1000meter start. World Cup Hamar, January 27th 2008

Personal information
- Born: 16 September 1981 (age 44)
- Website: Tuomas Nieminen Website

Sport
- Country: Finland
- Sport: Speed skating

Tuomas Nieminen (born 16 September 1981) is a Finnish long track speed skater who participates in international competitions.

== Personal records ==
Personal records
Men's Speed skating
Event	Result	Date	Location	Notes
500 m	35.21	2009-12-12	Salt Lake City	
1,000 m	1:09.53	2009-12-13	Salt Lake City	
1,500 m	1:50.92	2004-03-10	Calgary	
