= Alla Shabanova =

Russian speed skater

Personal information
- Nationality: Russian
- Born: 25 October 1982 (age 42); Dresden, Germany

Sport
- Sport: Speed skating

Alla Shabanova (born 25 October 1982) is a Russian speed skater. She competed in two events at the 2010 Winter Olympics.
