= Jörg Dallmann =

German speed skater

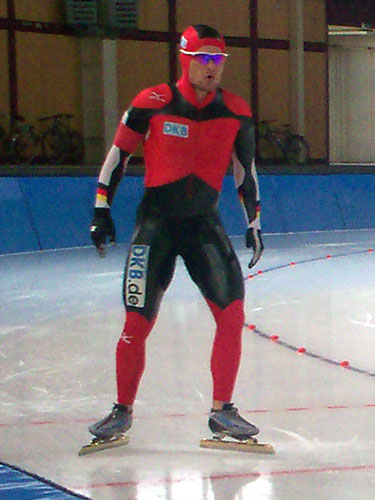
- Jörg Dallmann in 2008

Personal information
- Nationality: German
- Born: 10 August 1979 (age 45); Erfurt, East Germany

Sport
- Sport: Speed skating

Jörg Dallmann (born 10 August 1979) is a German speed skater. He competed in two events at the 2006 Winter Olympics.
