= Teruhiro Sugimori =

Japanese speed skater (born 1982)

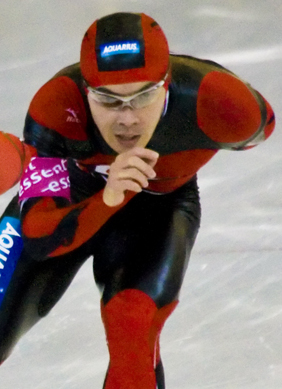
- Teruhiro Sugimori in 2009

Personal information
- Nationality: Japanese
- Born: 15 October 1982 (age 43) Hokkaido, Japan

Sport
- Sport: Speed skating

Teruhiro Sugimori (born 15 October 1982) is a Japanese speed skater. He competed at the 2006 Winter Olympics and the 2010 Winter Olympics.
