= Sayuri Yoshii =

Japanese speed skater (born 1984)

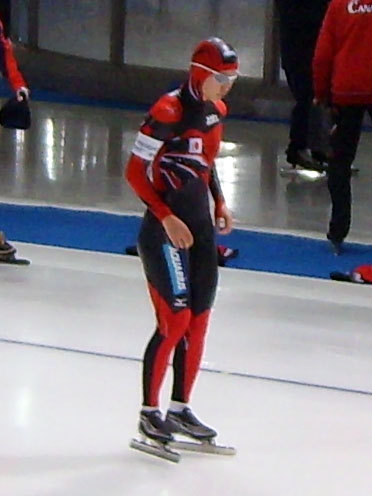
- Yoshii in 2008

Personal information
- Born: 28 November 1984 (age 41) Nagano, Japan

Sport
- Country: Japan
- Sport: Speed skating
Medal record
World Sprint Championships
Silver medal – second place	2010 Obihiro	Sprint

Sayuri Yoshii (吉井 小百合, Yoshii Sayuri; born 28 November 1984) is a Japanese speed skater. She won silver in the 1000 m and bronze in the 500 m during the 2008–09 World Cup season. She competed in the 2006 Winter Olympics and placed 5th in the 500 m of the 2010 Winter Olympics.

The biggest success of Sayuri Yoshii's career occurred in 2010, when she won the silver medal at the world sprint championships in Obihiro. In these competitions two others took the podium alongside her, Lee Sang-hwa of South Korea and a Jenny Wolf of Germany. This was the only medal won by Sayuri Yoshii at an international event of this magnitude. She was also fourth in women's 500 meters at the distance world championships in Inzell in 2005, where Lee Sang-hwa defeated her by only a matter of seconds. Sayuri Yoshii has, on numerous occasions, been on the podium of the World Cup, with 500 m victories on February 20, 2005 and March 3, 2006 in Heerenveen. Her top results were achieved in the 2004/2005 season, when she was fourth in the final standings on 500 m and 1000 m. In 2006, she took part in the Olympics in Turin, taking ninth place in the race for 500 m and fifteenth place in the 1000 meters. Then, four years later, the Olympics in Vancouver allowed for her best result, a fifth place at the 500 m race.
