= Nancy Swider-Peltz Jr. =

American speed skater

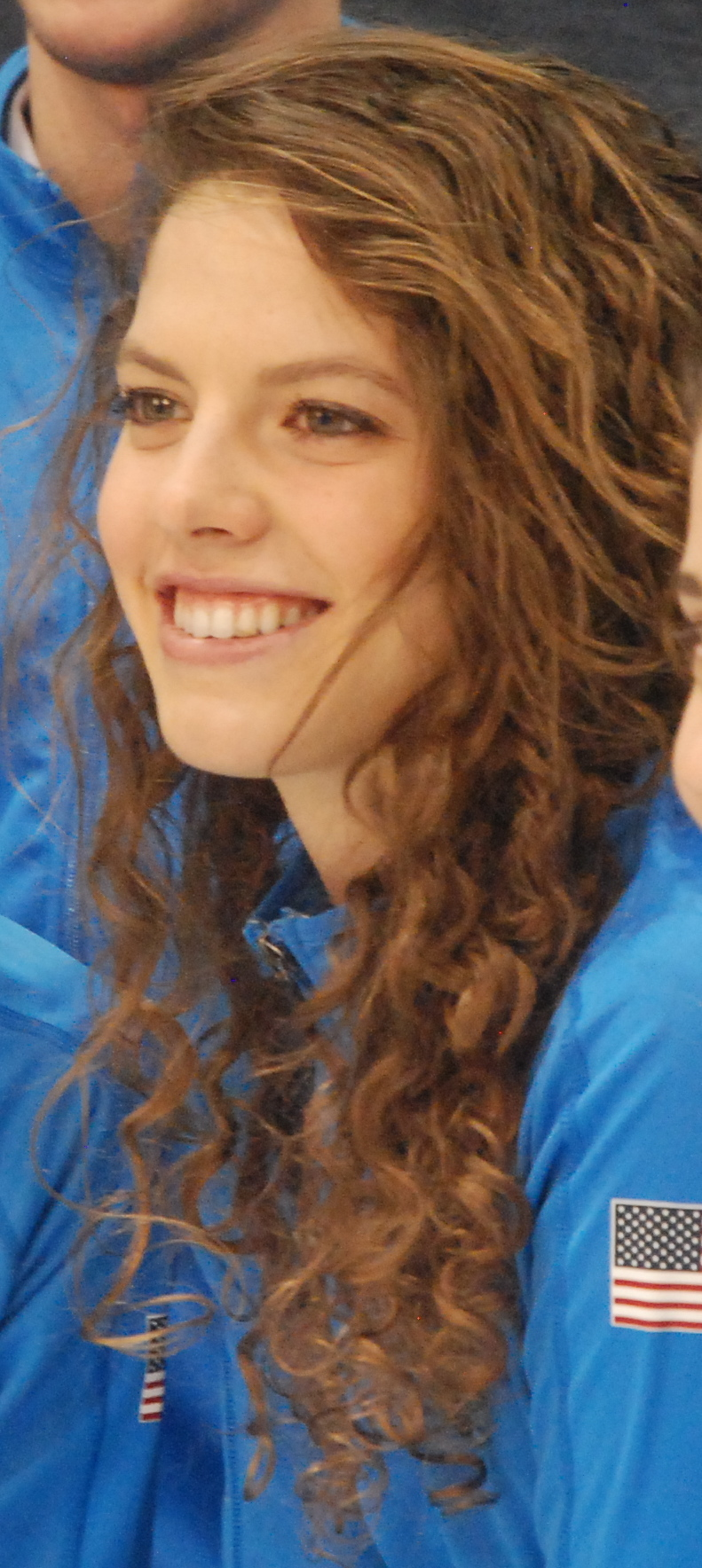
- Swider-Peltz in 2009

Personal information
- Born: January 10, 1987 (age 39) Maywood, Illinois, US
- Height: 5 ft 8 in (1.73 m)
- Weight: 150 lb (68 kg)
- Website: TeamSwiderpeltz.com

Sport
- Country: United States
- Sport: Speed skating
- Club: Pettit National Ice Center, Milwaukee

Nancy Swider-Peltz Jr. (born January 10, 1987) is an American speed skater who competed at the 2010 Winter Olympics.

== 2010 Winter Olympics ==
In the 3000 m, Swider-Peltz finished 9th overall with a time of 4:11.16 and placed 4th along with Jennifer Rodriguez and Jilleanne Rookard in the team pursuit event at the Vancouver Olympics, upsetting the Canadian women by winning their first round of qualifications, which was also dubbed one of the greatest upsets of the 2010 Olympics, because the Canadian women were favored to win gold.

== Biography ==
Swider-Peltz graduated from Wheaton North High School in Wheaton, Illinois, in 2005 and is currently working, amongst her speedskating career, on her bachelor's degree in Communications at Wheaton College. Swider-Peltz's mother, Nancy Sr., competed in four Winter Olympics as a speed skater from the mid-1970s to the late 1980s. In Nancy Sr.'s last Olympics, baby Nancy was one year old. Once Nancy Jr. picked up speedskating at the age of 13, her dream was to participate in the Olympics. She even competed against her mother at the Olympic trials in 2001, the season they overlapped each other before Nancy Sr. became a coach. Nancy Sr. has been Nancy Jr.'s coach throughout her career and now her brother, Jeffrey Peltz Jr. (who goes by Jeffrey Swider-Peltz in the speedskating world), has begun speedskating. Nancy Jr. now coaches at Park Ridge Speed Skating club in Park Ridge, Illinois. She is currently a Brand Partner for Young Living, a company that promotes health and wellness products.
