= 2008–09 ISU Speed Skating World Cup – World Cup 2 =

The second competition weekend of the 2008–09 ISU Speed Skating World Cup was held in Thialf in Heerenveen, Netherlands, from Friday, 14 November, until Sunday, 16 November 2008.

== Schedule of events ==
Schedule of the event:

Date	Time	Events
14 November	16:00 CET	500 m women 500 m men 3000 m women 1500 m men
15 November	13:15 CET	500 m women 500 m men 1500 m women 5000 m men
16 November	13:15 CET	1000 m women 1000 m men Team pursuit women Team pursuit men

== Medal summary ==
=== Men's events ===
Event	Race #	Gold	Time	Silver	Time	Bronze	Time	Report
500 m	1	Pekka Koskela; Finland	34.88	Dmitry Lobkov; Russia	35.16	Yu Fengtong; China	35.18	
500 m	2	Joji Kato; Japan	34.82	Yu Fengtong; China	35.05	Pekka Koskela; Finland	35.09	
1000 m		Shani Davis; United States	1:08.99	Pekka Koskela; Finland	1:09.05	Simon Kuipers; Netherlands	1:09.26	
1500 m		Shani Davis; United States	1:45.23	Stefan Groothuis; Netherlands	1:45.84	Mark Tuitert; Netherlands	1:45.90	
5000 m		Sven Kramer; Netherlands	6:14.32	Carl Verheijen; Netherlands	6:20.18	Enrico Fabris; Italy	6:20.20	
Team pursuit		Netherlands; Sven Kramer; Simon Kuipers; Carl Verheijen	3:42.29	United States; Shani Davis; Chad Hedrick; Trevor Marsicano	3:43.48	Sweden; Joel Eriksson; Daniel Friberg; Johan Röjler	3:47.20	

=== Women's events ===
Event	Race #	Gold	Time	Silver	Time	Bronze	Time	Report
500 m	1	Jenny Wolf; Germany	37.60	Wang Beixing; China	37.63	Lee Sang-hwa; South Korea	38.22	
500 m	2	Jenny Wolf; Germany	37.64	Wang Beixing; China	37.74	Lee Sang-hwa; South Korea	38.13	
1000 m		Christine Nesbitt; Canada	1:16.18	Kristina Groves; Canada	1:16.76	Wang Beixing; China	1:17.01	
1500 m		Kristina Groves; Canada	1:57.22	Daniela Anschütz-Thoms; Germany	1:57.91	Christine Nesbitt; Canada	1:58.08	
3000 m		Renate Groenewold; Netherlands	4:04.85	Martina Sáblíková; Czech Republic	4:05.54	Diane Valkenburg; Netherlands	4:05.70	
Team pursuit		Netherlands; Renate Groenewold; Marrit Leenstra; Ireen Wüst	3:01.32	Canada; Kristina Groves; Christine Nesbitt; Brittany Schussler	3:02.34	Germany; Daniela Anschütz-Thoms; Lucille Opitz; Claudia Pechstein	3:02.51	
