= Jin Peiyu =

Chinese speed skater

Personal information
- Born: April 17, 1985 (age 41) Harbin, China

Sport
- Country: China
- Sport: Speed skating
- Event(s): 500 m, 1000 m
Medal record
Winter Universiade
Gold medal – first place	2009 Harbin	1000 m

Jin Peiyu (Chinese: 金佩钰; born April 17, 1985, in Harbin) is a Chinese female speed skater.

She competed for China at the 2010 Winter Olympics in the 500m and 1000m events.
