= Lucille Opitz =

German speed skater

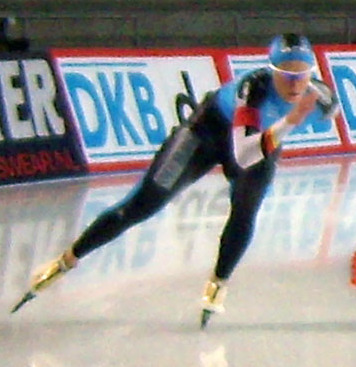

Medal record

Women's speed skating

Representing Germany

Olympic Games
Gold medal – first place	2006 Turin	Team pursuit

World Championships
Bronze medal – third place	2007 Salt Lake City	Team pursuit

Lucille Opitz (born 24 November 1977) is a German speed skater who won a gold medal in the women's team pursuit at the 2006 Winter Olympics.
