= 2008–09 ISU Speed Skating World Cup – World Cup 9 =

Simple overview of ISU speed skating world cup

The ninth and final competition weekend of the 2008–09 ISU Speed Skating World Cup was a three-day event with races in all cups except the team pursuits, held at the Utah Olympic Oval in Salt Lake City, United States, from Friday, March 6, until Sunday, March 8, 2009.

American Shani Davis set new world records for the 1000 and 1500 meters distances.

== Schedule of events ==
Schedule of the event:

Date	Time	Events
March 6	12:30	500 m men 1000 m women 1500 m men 3000 m women
March 7	12:30	500 m women 1000 m men 1500 m women 5000 m men 100 m women 100 m men

== Medal winners ==
=== Men's events ===
Event	Gold	Time	Silver	Time	Bronze	Time	Report
100 m	Yuya Oikawa; Japan	9.49	Lee Kang-seok; South Korea	9.63	Yu Fengtong; China	9.80	
500 m	Yu Fengtong; China	34.37	Lee Kyou-hyuk; South Korea	34.38	Tucker Fredricks; United States	34.51	
1000 m	Shani Davis; United States	1:06.42; WR	Trevor Marsicano; United States	1:06.88	Denny Morrison; Canada	1:07.11	
1500 m	Shani Davis; United States	1:41.80; WR	Trevor Marsicano; United States	1:42.31	Denny Morrison; Canada	1:42.56	
5000 m	Sven Kramer; Netherlands	6:06.64	Håvard Bøkko; Norway	6:09.94	Carl Verheijen; Netherlands	6:13.17	

=== Women's events ===
Event	Gold	Time	Silver	Time	Bronze	Time	Report
100 m	Jenny Wolf; Germany	10.25	Yu Jing; China	10.44	Shihomi Shinya; Japan	10.45	
500 m	Wang Beixing; China	37.25	Jenny Wolf; Germany	37.39	Yu Jing; China	37.62	
1000 m	Anni Friesinger; Germany	1:13.86	Sayuri Yoshii; Japan	1:14.05	Christine Nesbitt; Canada	1:14.41	
1500 m	Kristina Groves; Canada	1:54.08	Maki Tabata; Japan	1:54.79	Brittany Schussler; Canada	1:54.91	
3000 m	Martina Sáblíková; Czech Republic	3:58.62	Daniela Anschütz-Thoms; Germany	3:59.88	Kristina Groves; Canada	4:00.00	
