= Shannon Rempel =

Canadian speed skater (born 1984)

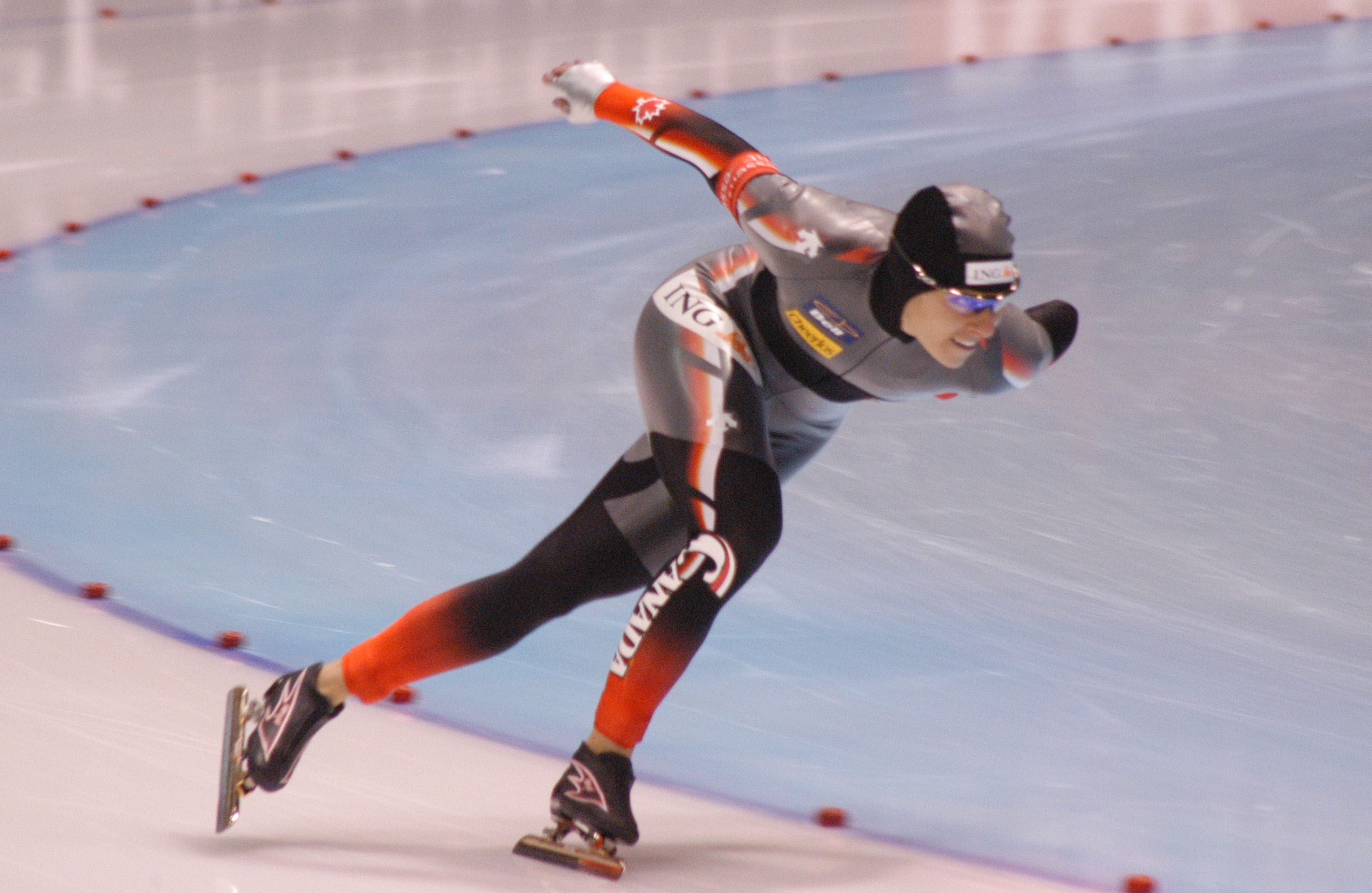
- Rempel participating at the 2007 World Cup in Heerenveen, Netherlands

Personal information
- Born: November 26, 1984 (age 41) Winnipeg, Manitoba, Canada

Sport
- Country: Canada
- Sport: Speed skating
- Club: Canadian Sprint Team; St. James Speed Skating Club
- World Cup wins: 2006 - 1000m

Achievements and titles
- Personal best: 500m - 37.80 1000m - 1:15.00; 1500m - 1:54.60 3000m - 4:15.28
Medal record
Women's speed skating
Olympic Games
Silver medal – second place	2006 Turin	Team pursuit
World Speed Skating Championships
Gold medal – first place	2007 Salt Lake City	Team pursuit
World Junior Championships
Gold medal – first place	2003 Kushiro	Overall
Gold medal – first place	2003 Kushiro	1000m
Gold medal – first place	2004 Roseville	500m
Gold medal – first place	2004 Roseville	1000m
Silver medal – second place	2001 Groningen	500m
Silver medal – second place	2003 Kushiro	500m
Bronze medal – third place	2001 Groningen	1000m
Bronze medal – third place	2004 Roseville	Overall
Bronze medal – third place	2004 Roseville	1500m
Bronze medal – third place	2004 Roseville	Team pursuit

Shannon Rempel (born November 26, 1984) is a Canadian speed skater. An Olympic silver medalist from the 2006 Winter Olympics in the team pursuit. World Champion in the team pursuit from 2007 World Single Distance Championships, SLC, UT. Rempel also participated in the 2010 Vancouver Olympics, in the 500m, and 1000m distances. She specializes in the sprint and middle distances, capturing many podium finishes over the years at the World Cup events. Rempel is also known for her win as the 2003 World Junior Speed Skating Championships.

Previously she held the World Junior record in the 500m, and in the combined sprint distances. Currently she still holds the Canadian Jr. records in the 500m and 1000m.

Shannon signed a flag which was brought up to the international space station.

== Biography ==
=== Early life ===
Rempel was born in Winnipeg, Manitoba. She was introduced to speed skating at age 10 at the St. James Speed Skating Club when her friend suggested that she try it.

Preceded by Elma de Vries	Female World Junior Speed Skating Champion; 2003	Succeeded by Eriko Ishino
