= Trevor Marsicano =

American speed skater (born 1989)

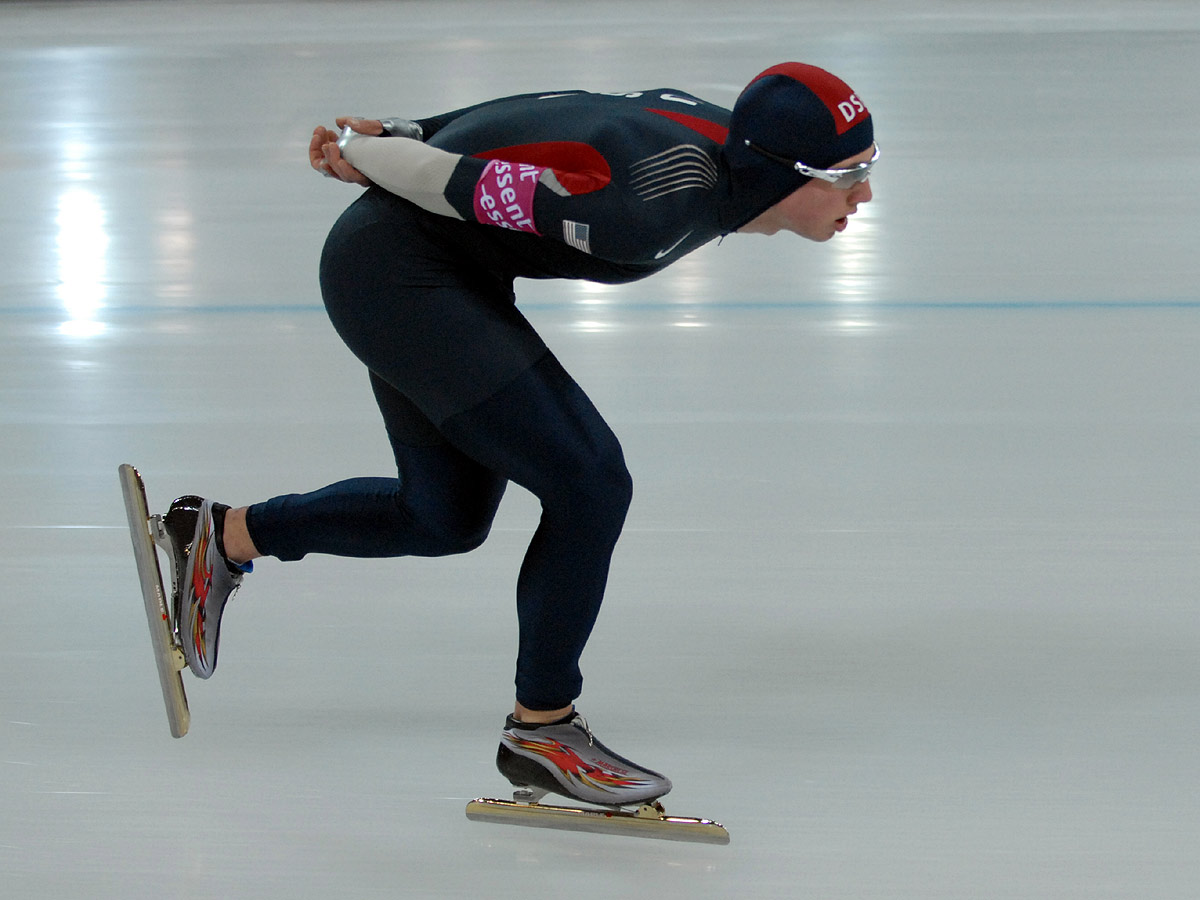
- Marsicano at the 2009 World Allround Championships.

Personal information
- Born: April 5, 1989 (age 37) Schenectady, New York
- Height: 5 ft 8 in (1.73 m)
- Weight: 145 lb (66 kg)

Sport
- Country: United States
- Sport: Speed skating
Medal record
Men's speed skating
Representing the United States
Olympic Games
| Silver medal – second place | 2010 Vancouver | Team pursuit |
World Championships
| Gold medal – first place | 2009 Vancouver | 1000 m |
| Gold medal – first place | 2011 Inzell | Team pursuit |
| Silver medal – second place | 2009 Vancouver | 1500 m |
| Bronze medal – third place | 2009 Vancouver | 5000 m |
| Bronze medal – third place | 2009 Vancouver | Team pursuit |
World Junior Championships
| Bronze medal – third place | 2007 Innsbruck | Overall |

Trevor Marsicano (born April 5, 1989) is an American speed skater and silver medalist in the Winter Olympics.

At the 2010 Winter Olympics, Marsicano won a silver medal for his part in the team pursuit. He did not skate in the final but did skate in the quarterfinals with Chad Hedrick and Jonathan Kuck.

Marsicano's breakthrough performance was at the 2009 World Single Distance Championships where he won four medals (one gold, one silver, two bronze). Overall, Marsicano has won two golds, one silver, and two bronze at the World Championships. Marsicano has also won the overall bronze at the World Junior Championships.

== Career ==
Marsicano started playing ice hockey, but switched to short track speed skating at a young age with the Saratoga Winter Club. In 2004, he suffered a very deep open wound to his thigh during a fall with another skater. After his rehabilitation, he changed to long track speed skating.

=== 2007–2008 ===
At his debut at the 2007 World Junior Championships, Marsicano won the overall bronze medal, the first medal won by an American since 1993. The following year at the 2008 World Junior Championships, he finished fourth. At his first senior World Allround in the same year, he finished in 20th place.

=== 2009 ===
At the 2009 World Allround Championships, Marsicano finished 5th, only being beaten by Sven Kramer, Håvard Bøkko, Enrico Fabris and Wouter olde Heuvel.

Marsicano then went on to win four medals at the 2009 World Single Distance Championships at the Richmond Olympic Oval. He won the gold medal and became world champion in the 1000 m race, ahead of Denny Morrison and Shani Davis. He also won the silver medal in the 1500 m and the bronze medal in the 5000 m and in the eight lap track pursuit event alongside his American teammates Ryan Bedford and Brian Hansen.

On March 7, 2009, at the Salt Lake City Olympic Oval, he became the first skater to break the 1:07 barrier in the 1000 m, clocking 1:06.88 for the distance, 12/100 better than Pekka Koskela's world record of 1:07.00. However, later in the competition, Shani Davis would clinch the world record, as he skated the distance in 1:06.42.

=== 2010 Winter Olympics ===
Marsicano's first race was the 5000 m on February 13. He finished 14th overall, with a 6:30.93. He then competed on February 17 in the 1000 m. In the 1000 m, Marsicano placed 10th with a 1:10.11. In the 1500 m on February 20, he raced a 1:47.84 and placed 15th.

The American pursuit team consisted of Marsicano, Chad Hedrick, Jonathan Kuck and Brian Hansen. Kuck, Hedrick and Marsicano eliminated Japan in the quarterfinal, which advanced them to face the heavily favored Netherlands in the semifinal. Kuck, Hedrick and Hansen then beat the Dutch team by .4 seconds, with a final time of 3:42.71.

The American team were defeated by the Canadians in the gold medal final. The same trio that skated the semifinal trailed Canada in the gold medal final by as much as 0.73 seconds early in the race, trimming that margin to 0.21 at the finish with a time of 3:41.58. The Canadians hit the line at 3:41.37 to win the gold medal, leaving the American team with silver. The bronze went to the Dutch team, which set an Olympic record in the B final with a time of 3:39.95.

=== Post-2010 ===
In the post-Olympic season Marsicano was on his way back to the top. He won with team USA his second and third World Cup team pursuit race. That season he also won his currently only two individual world cup races, both 1500 metres. The 2011–12 season started disappointingly. Due to overtraining he was not able to make promotion to the A-group of the World Cup. In December 2011 he quit his season.
