= Xing Aihua =

Chinese speed skater

Medal record

Women's speed skating

Representing China

Asian Games
Gold medal – first place	2007 Changchun	100 m

Xing Aihua (Chinese: 邢愛華, born February 4, 1978) is a Chinese long-track speed-skater. She represented China at the 2010 Winter Olympics in the Women's 500m and 1000m.
