= 2008–09 ISU Speed Skating World Cup =

International speed skating competition

ISU Speed Skating World Cup
- Dates: 7 November 2008 – 7 March 2009

The 2008–09 ISU Speed Skating World Cup, officially the Essent ISU World Cup Speed Skating 2008–2009, was a series of international speed skating competitions which ran the entire season. The season started on 7 November 2008 in Berlin, Germany, and ended on 7 March 2009 in Salt Lake City, United States. In total, nine competition weekends were held at eight different locations, twelve cups were contested (six for men, and six for women), and 84 races took place. The World Cup is organized by the International Skating Union (ISU).

== Calendar ==
WC #	City	Venue	Date	100 m	500 m	1000 m	1500 m	3000 m	5000 m	10000 m	Team pursuit
1	Berlin	Sportforum Hohenschönhausen	7–9 November		2m, 2w	m, w	m, w	w	m		m, w
2	Heerenveen	Thialf	14–16 November		2m, 2w	m, w	m, w	w	m		m, w
3	Moscow	Krylatskoye Sport Complex	22–23 November				m, w		w	m	
4	Changchun	Jilin Provincial Speed Skating Rink	6–7 December	m, w	2m, 2w	2m, 2w					
5	Nagano	M-Wave	13–14 December	m, w	2m, 2w	2m, 2w					
	Tomakomai	Tomakomai Highland Sports Center	4–5 January	2009 Asian Speed Skating Championships							
	Heerenveen	Thialf	9–11 January	2009 European Speed Skating Championships							
	Moscow	Krylatskoye Sport Complex	17–18 January	2009 World Sprint Speed Skating Championships							
6	Kolomna	Kometa Ice Rink	24–25 January	m, w	2m, 2w	2m, 2w					
7	Erfurt	Gunda Niemann-Stirnemann Halle	30 January – 1 February		2m, 2w	m, w	m, w	w	m		m, w
	Hamar	Vikingskipet	7–8 February	2009 World Allround Speed Skating Championships							
8	Heerenveen	Thialf	14–15 February				m, w		w	m	
9	Salt Lake City	Utah Olympic Oval	6–7 March	m, w	m, w	m, w	m, w	w	m		
	Vancouver	Richmond Olympic Oval	12–15 March	2009 World Single Distance Speed Skating Championships							
Total				4m, 4w	13m, 13w	10m, 10w	6m, 6w	4w	4m, 2w	2m	3m, 3w

Note: the men's 5000 and 10000 metres were contested as one cup, and the women's 3000 and 5000 metres were contested as one cup, as indicated by the color coding.

== World records ==
World records going into the 2008–09 season.

=== Men ===
Distance	Time	Nat.	Holder	Date	Venue	Reference
500 m	34.03	(Canada)	Jeremy Wotherspoon	9 November 2007	Utah Olympic Oval, Salt Lake City	
1000 m	1:07.00	(Finland)	Pekka Koskela	10 November 2007	Utah Olympic Oval, Salt Lake City	
1500 m	1:42.01	(Canada)	Denny Morrison	14 March 2008	Olympic Oval, Calgary	
5000 m	6:03.32	(Netherlands)	Sven Kramer	17 November 2007	Olympic Oval, Calgary	
10000 m	12:41.69	(Netherlands)	Sven Kramer	10 March 2007	Utah Olympic Oval, Salt Lake City	
Team pursuit (8 laps)	3:37.80	(Netherlands)	Sven Kramer; Carl Verheijen; Erben Wennemars	11 March 2007	Utah Olympic Oval, Salt Lake City	

At the World Cup stop in Salt Lake City on 6 March 2009, Shani Davis of the United States set a new world record on the men's 1500 metres with a time of 1:41.80. The next day, Davis' countryman Trevor Marsicano first set a new world record on the 1000 metres distance with a time of 1:06.88, after which Davis improved it further, with a time of 1:06.42.

=== Women ===
Distance	Time	Nat.	Holder	Date	Venue	Reference
500 m	37.02	(Germany)	Jenny Wolf	16 November 2007	Olympic Oval, Calgary	
1000 m	1:13.11	(Canada)	Cindy Klassen	25 March 2006	Olympic Oval, Calgary	
1500 m	1:51.79	(Canada)	Cindy Klassen	20 November 2005	Utah Olympic Oval, Salt Lake City	
3000 m	3:53.34	(Canada)	Cindy Klassen	18 March 2006	Olympic Oval, Calgary	
5000 m	6:45.61	(Czech Republic)	Martina Sáblíková	11 March 2007	Utah Olympic Oval, Salt Lake City	
Team pursuit (6 laps)	2:56.04	(Germany)	Daniela Anschütz-Thoms; Anni Friesinger; Claudia Pechstein	12 November 2005	Olympic Oval, Calgary	

== Men's standings ==
=== 100 m ===
Rank	Name	Points
1	(Japan) Yuya Oikawa	450
2	(China) Yu Fengtong	305
3	(South Korea) Lee Kang-seok	270

=== 500 m ===
Rank	Name	Points
1	(China) Yu Fengtong	1086
2	(Japan) Keiichiro Nagashima	957
3	(United States) Tucker Fredricks	642

=== 1000 m ===
Rank	Name	Points
1	(United States) Shani Davis	840
2	(Canada) Denny Morrison	705
3	(Netherlands) Stefan Groothuis	590

=== 1500 m ===
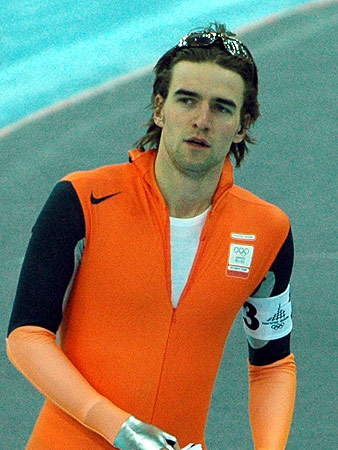
Mark Tuitert, early leader in the 1500 m World Cup.

Rank	Name	Points
1	(United States) Shani Davis	470
2	(United States) Trevor Marsicano	374
3	(Norway) Håvard Bøkko	363

=== 5000 and 10000 m ===
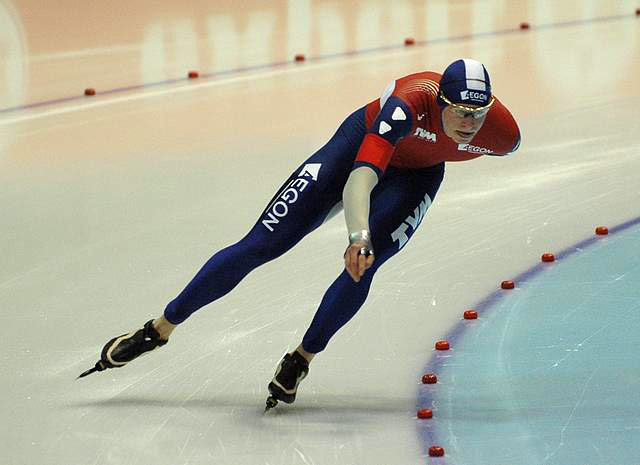
Sven Kramer, winner of the 5 km in Berlin and Heerenveen.

Rank	Name	Points
1	(Netherlands) Sven Kramer	550
2	(Norway) Håvard Bøkko	485
3	(Netherlands) Bob de Jong	425

=== Team pursuit ===
Rank	Name	Points
1	Canada	310
2	Italy	220
3	Japan	210

== Women's standings ==
=== 100 m ===
Rank	Name	Points
1	(Germany) Jenny Wolf	450
2	(Netherlands) Thijsje Oenema	236
3	(China) Xing Aihua	230

=== 500 m ===
Rank	Name	Points
1	(Germany) Jenny Wolf	1205
2	(Netherlands) Margot Boer	642
3	(South Korea) Lee Sang-hwa	635

=== 1000 m ===
Rank	Name	Points
1	(Canada) Christine Nesbitt	646
2	(Canada) Kristina Groves	507
3	(Netherlands) Laurine van Riessen	468

=== 1500 m ===
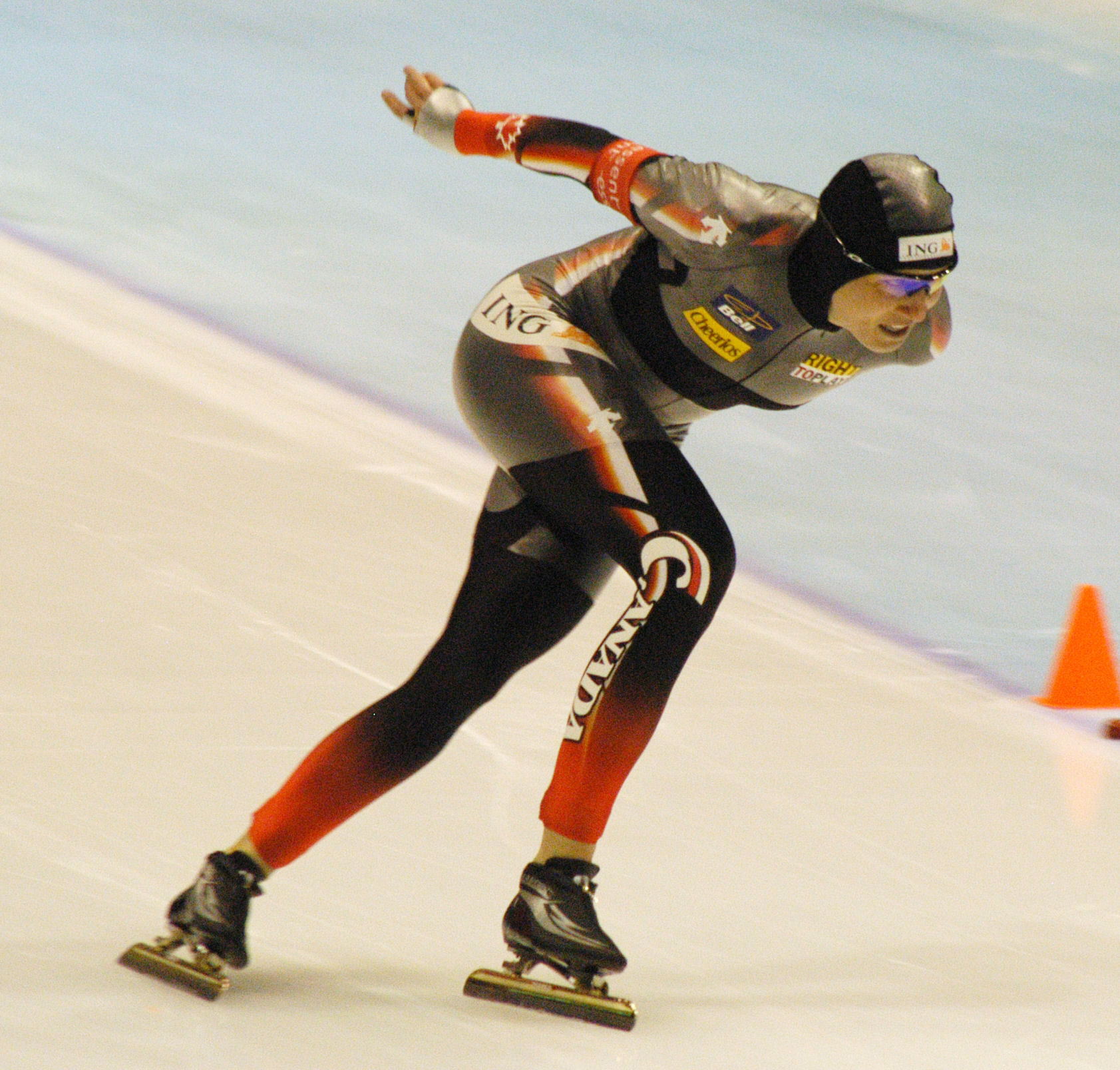
Kristina Groves, winner of the 1500 m in Berlin and Heerenveen, and the World Cup winner.

Rank	Name	Points
1	(Canada) Kristina Groves	526
2	(Germany) Daniela Anschütz-Thoms	355
3	(Canada) Christine Nesbitt	335

=== 3000 and 5000 m ===
Rank	Name	Points
1	(Czech Republic) Martina Sáblíková	610
2	(Germany) Daniela Anschütz-Thoms	375
3	(Canada) Kristina Groves	375

=== Team pursuit ===
Rank	Name	Points
1	Czech Republic	235
2	United States	205
3	Netherlands	200
