= Yu Fengtong =

Chinese speed skater

Medal record

Men's speed skating

Representing China

World Championships
Bronze medal – third place	2009 Vancouver	500 m

Asian Games
Silver medal – second place	2007 Changchun	100 m

Yu Fengtong (simplified Chinese: 于凤桐; traditional Chinese: 於鳳桐; pinyin: Yú Fèngtóng; born 15 December 1984 in Yichun, Heilongjiang) is a speed skater who has participated in the Olympics for the nation of China.

He is the national recordholder of China on the 500 meters.

== Achievements ==
- World Sprint Speed Skating Championships for Men (7 participations):
  - 2002, 2003, 2004, 2005, 2006, 2008, 2009
    - Best result 13th in 2005

== Personal records ==
Personal records
Men's Speed skating
Event	Result	Date	Location	Notes
500 m	34.37	6 March 2009	Salt Lake City	Chinese national record
1,000 m	1:09.09	23 January 2005	Salt Lake City	
1,500 m	1:55.71	9 December 2001	Calgary	
