= Kristina Groves =

Canadian speed skater

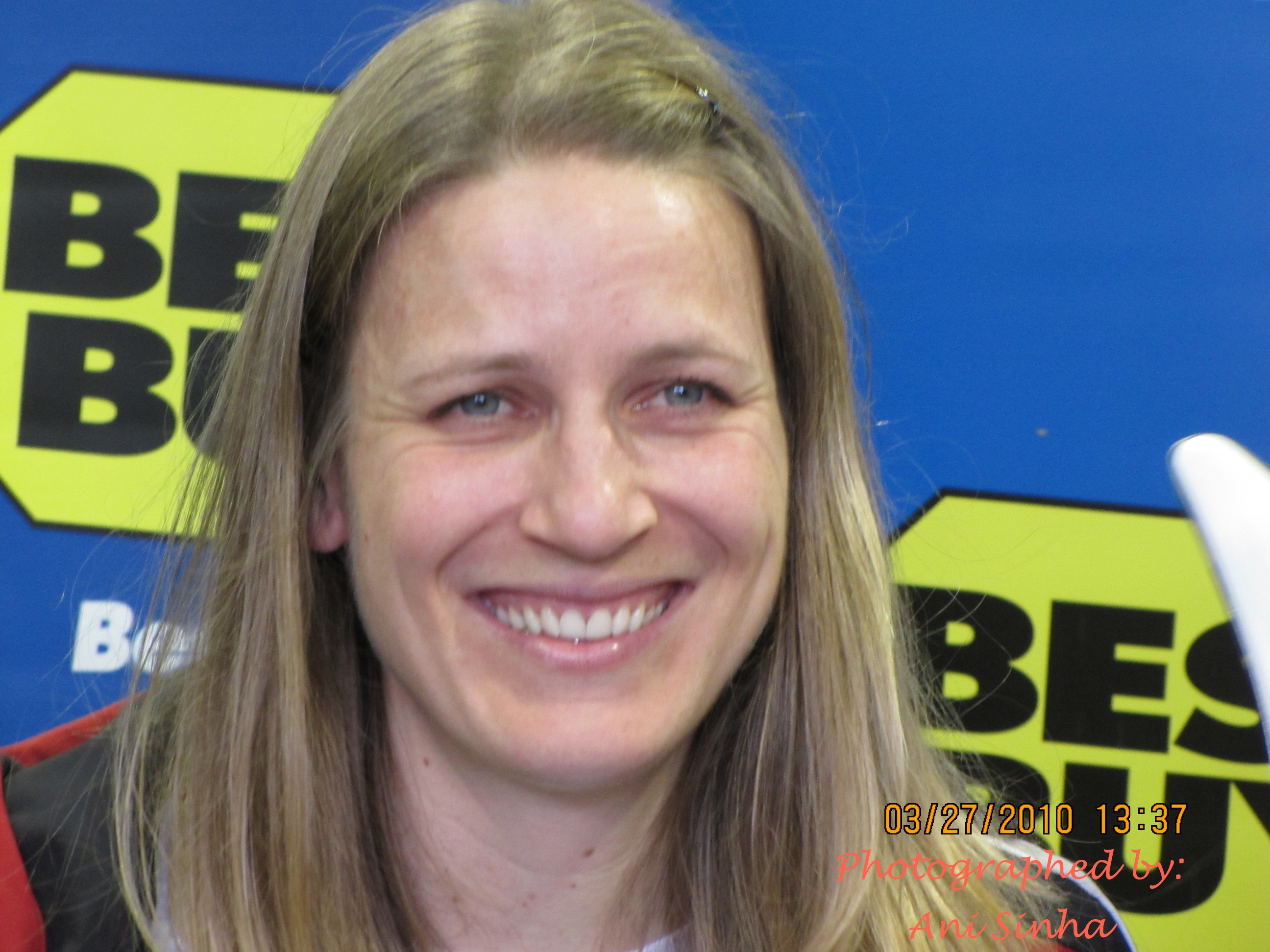

Personal information
- Born: December 4, 1976 (age 49) Ottawa, Ontario
- Height: 1.75 m (5 ft 9 in)
- Weight: 66 kg (146 lb; 10.4 st)

Sport
- Country: Canada
- Sport: Speed skating
Medal record
Women's speed skating
Representing Canada
Olympic Games
Silver medal – second place	2006 Turin	1500 m
Silver medal – second place	2006 Turin	Team pursuit
Silver medal – second place	2010 Vancouver	1500 m
Bronze medal – third place	2010 Vancouver	3000 m
World Allround Championships
Silver medal – second place	2009 Hamar	Allround
Silver medal – second place	2010 Heerenveen	Allround
Bronze medal – third place	2006 Calgary	Allround
Bronze medal – third place	2008 Berlin	Allround
World Single Distance Championships
Gold medal – first place	2007 Salt Lake City	Team pursuit
Gold medal – first place	2008 Nagano	3000 m
Gold medal – first place	2009 Vancouver	Team pursuit
Silver medal – second place	2005 Inzell	Team pursuit
Silver medal – second place	2008 Nagano	1000 m
Silver medal – second place	2008 Nagano	Team pursuit
Bronze medal – third place	2005 Inzell	3000 m
Bronze medal – third place	2007 Salt Lake City	1500 m
Bronze medal – third place	2007 Salt Lake City	5000 m
Bronze medal – third place	2008 Nagano	1500 m
Bronze medal – third place	2008 Nagano	5000 m
Bronze medal – third place	2009 Vancouver	3000 m
Bronze medal – third place	2009 Vancouver	5000 m
- Updated on November 23, 2012

Kristina Nicole Groves (born December 4, 1976) is a Canadian retired speed skater. She is Canada's most decorated skater in the World Single Distances Championships with 13 career medals in this event. She won four Olympic medals: she won two silver medals at the 2006 Winter Olympics in Turin, in the 1,500 meters and team pursuit, and she won the silver medal in the 1500 m event and the bronze medal in the 3000 m event at the Vancouver 2010 Winter Olympics.

As of 2012, she was ranked sixth on the women's Adelskalender, her teammates Cindy Klassen and Christine Nesbitt were ranked first and seventh respectively.

== Career ==
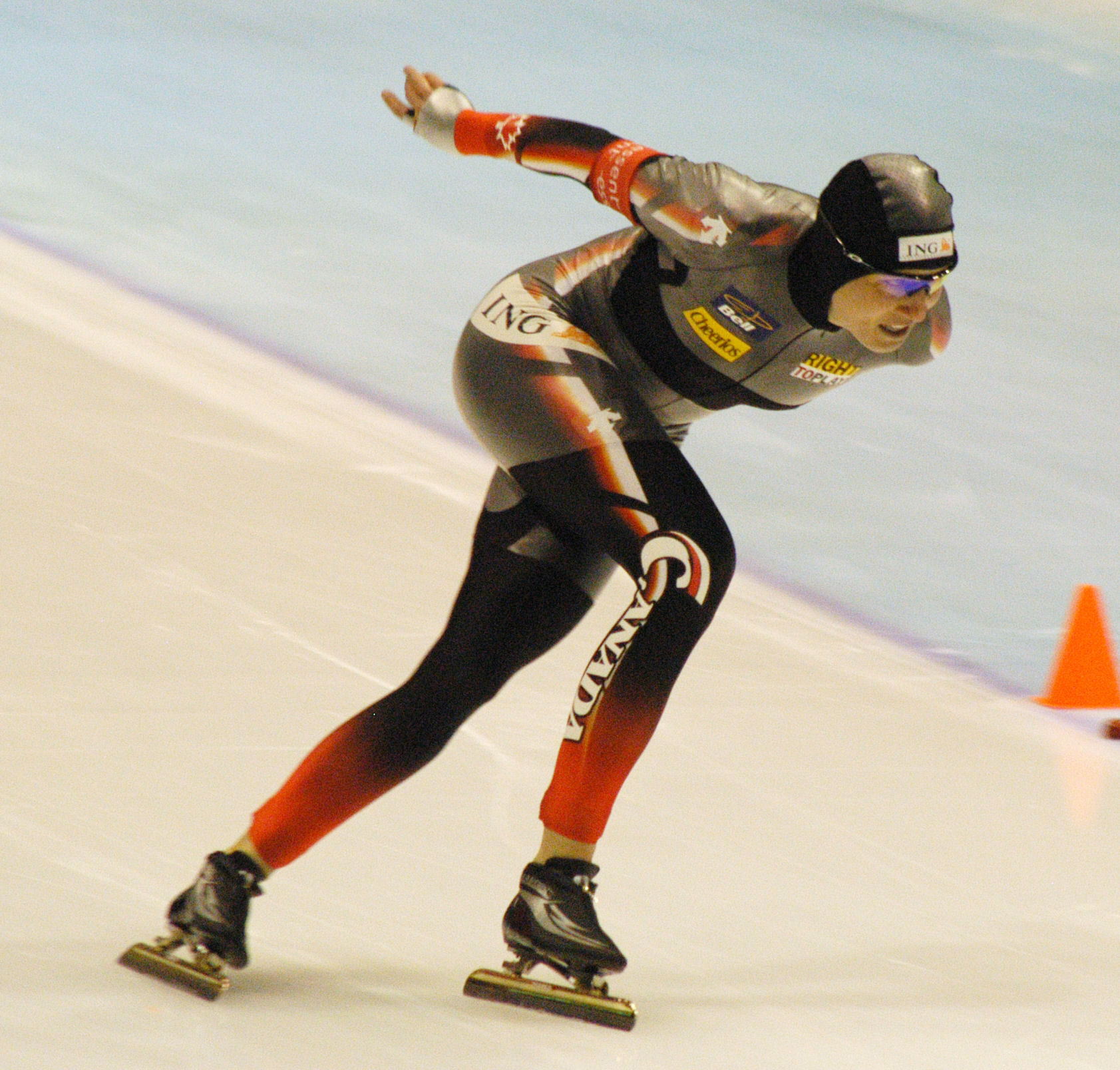
Kristina Groves (2008)

Groves made her Olympic debut in Salt Lake City for the 2002 Winter Olympics held in the United States. She finished 20th at 1500 m, 8th at 3000 m and 10th at 5000 m.

Four years later, during the 2006 Winter Olympics games held in Turin, Italy, Groves participated in five events (1000 m, 1500 m, 3000 m, 5000 m, team pursuit). She finished 5th at 1000 m, 2nd at the 1500 m, 8th at the 3000 m, 6th at the 5000 m, and 2nd in the team pursuit with the Canadian team.

She was the 2008 Single Distances World Champion on the 3000-m. She won a medal in every event that she skated at these championships, as she also won an additional 2 silver medals and 2 bronze medals.

During the 2008–2009 world cup season, Groves won 12 medals including four gold. During the 2009 World Single Distances Championships held at the new Richmond Olympic Oval, near Vancouver, British Columbia, Canada, her career took an amazing turn when Groves became the most decorated speed skating athlete in the country at this event, surpassing the well-known Jeremy Wotherspoon with 13 medals, compared to his 10. She is also the world cup winner for a second year in a row at 1500 m event.

During the Calgary Essent ISU Worldcup held at the Olympic Oval, Groves set a world record on December 6, 2009, at the team pursuit with teammates Christine Nesbitt and Brittany Schussler with a time of two minutes 55.79 seconds.

Groves qualified for 5 events for the 2010 Winter Olympic Games held in Vancouver and participated in the 1000 m, 1500 m, 3000 m, 5000 m and team pursuit, more than any other athletes on the Canadian speed skating team. In her first event at the Olympics, the 3000 metres, she won a bronze medal. On February 18 she finished fourth in the 1000 metres, .06 seconds behind the bronze medal winner. Her teammate Christine Nesbitt won the gold medal. On February 21, she won a silver medal in the 1500 metres. She became the 11th Canadian to win at least four medals at the Olympics (Summer or Winter).

== Personal life ==
Born in Ottawa, Groves attended Fielding Drive Public School and Brookfield High School. She trained with the Ottawa Pacers Speed Skating Club. She majored in kinesiology at University of Calgary and graduated in 2004. Groves was inducted into the Ottawa Sports Hall of Fame in 2014.

== Personal records ==
Groves' current Adelskalender score is 157.616, which places 6th of all time.

500 m	–	38.75
1000 m	–	1:14.51
1500 m	–	1:53.18
3000 m	–	3:58.11
5000 m	–	6:54.54

Source: SpeedskatingResults.com.

=== World records ===
Event	Time	Date	Venue
Team pursuit	3:05.49	November 12, 2004	Hamar
Team pursuit	3:03.07	November 20, 2004	Berlijn
Team pursuit	2:55.79	December 6, 2009	Calgary

Source: SpeedSkatingStats.com.
