= 2008 European Speed Skating Championships =

International speed skating competition

European Speed Skating Championships
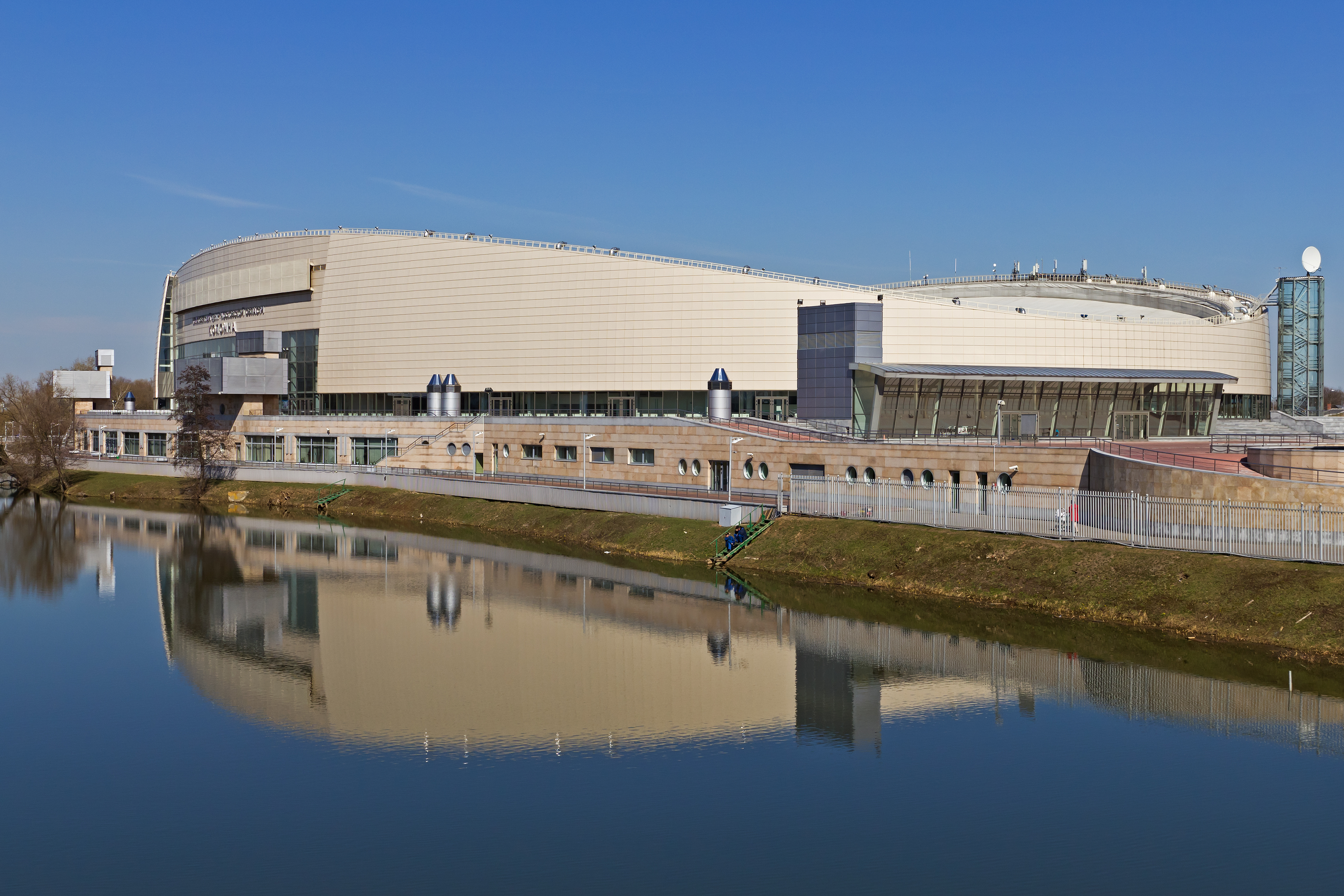
- Rink in Kolomna
- Venue: Kolomna, Russia
- Dates: 12–13 January 2008
- Competitors: 33 men 25 women

Medalist men
1st place, gold medalist(s)		Sven Kramer	NED
2nd place, silver medalist(s)		Håvard Bøkko	NOR
3rd place, bronze medalist(s)		Enrico Fabris	ITA

Medalist women
1st place, gold medalist(s)		Ireen Wüst	NED
2nd place, silver medalist(s)		Paulien van Deutekom	NED
3rd place, bronze medalist(s)		Martina Sáblíková	CZE

The 2008 European Speed Skating Championships were held at the Kolomna Speed Skating Center in Kolomna, Russia, from 12 to 13 January 2008.

== Men's championships ==
=== Day 1 ===
==== 500 metres ====
Place	Athlete	Country	Time
1st place, gold medalist(s)	Sven Kramer	Netherlands	36.20
2nd place, silver medalist(s)	Konrad Niedźwiedzki	Poland	36.22
3rd place, bronze medalist(s)	Yevgeny Lalenkov	Russia	36.32
4	Håvard Bøkko	Norway	36.36
5	Ivan Skobrev	Russia	36.74

==== 5000 metres ====
Place	Athlete	Country	Time
1st place, gold medalist(s)	Sven Kramer	Netherlands	6:11.78
2nd place, silver medalist(s)	Håvard Bøkko	Norway	6:17.45
3rd place, bronze medalist(s)	Wouter olde Heuvel	Netherlands	6:17.69
4	Enrico Fabris	Italy	6:17.86
5	Ivan Skobrev	Russia	6:24.10

=== Day 2 ===
==== 1500 metres ====
Place	Athlete	Country	Time
1st place, gold medalist(s)	Yevgeny Lalenkov	Russia	1:45.24
2nd place, silver medalist(s)	Enrico Fabris	Italy	1:45.45
3rd place, bronze medalist(s)	Sven Kramer	Netherlands	1:45.52
4	Håvard Bøkko	Norway	1:46.12
5	Wouter olde Heuvel	Netherlands	1:46.42

==== 10000 metres ====
Place	Athlete	Country	Time
1st place, gold medalist(s)	Sven Kramer	Netherlands	13:03.30
2nd place, silver medalist(s)	Håvard Bøkko	Norway	13:06.42
3rd place, bronze medalist(s)	Enrico Fabris	Italy	13:14.22
4	Wouter olde Heuvel	Netherlands	13:17.08
5	Tobias Schneider	Germany	13:22.09

=== Allround results ===
Place	Athlete	Country	500 m	5000 m	1500 m	10000 m	Points
1st place, gold medalist(s)	Sven Kramer	Netherlands	36.20 (1)	6:11.78 (1)	1:45.52 (3)	13:03.30 (1)	147.716
2nd place, silver medalist(s)	Håvard Bøkko	Norway	36.32 (4)	6:17.45 (2)	1:46.12 (4)	13:06.42 (2)	148.759
3rd place, bronze medalist(s)	Enrico Fabris	Italy	36.76 (7)	6:17.86 (4)	1:45.45 (2)	13:14.22 (3)	149.407
4	Wouter olde Heuvel	Netherlands	36.74 (6)	6:17.69 (3)	1:46.42 (5)	13:17.08 (4)	149.836
5	Ivan Skobrev	Russia	36.36 (5)	6:24.10 (5)	1:47.52 (7)	13:38.73 (9)	151.546
6	Ben Jongejan	Netherlands	37.28 (13)	6:26.08 (6)	1:47.11 (6)	13:24.76 (6)	151.829
7	Tobias Schneider	Germany	37.26 (12)	6:29.15 (10)	1:47.64 (8)	13:22.09 (5)	152.159
8	Ted-Jan Bloemen	Netherlands	37.35 (14)	6:27.81 (9)	1:49.56 (15)	13:26.48 (7)	152.975
9	Yevgeny Lalenkov	Russia	36.22 (3)	6:36.40 (15)	1:45.24 (1)	14:02.69 (11)	153.074
10	Sverre Haugli	Norway	37.95 (20)	6:27.21 (8)	1:48.05 (10)	13:27.92 (8)	153.083
11	Henrik Christiansen	Norway	37.60 (17)	6:26.89 (7)	1:48.42 (11)	13:39.64 (10)	153.411
12	Robert Lehmann	Germany	36.91 (8)	6:32.49 (12)	1:48.43 (12)	14:08.51 (12)	154.727
NQ13	Konrad Niedźwiedzki	Poland	36.21 (2)	6:40.43 (18)	1:48.02 (9)		
NQ14	Matteo Anesi	Italy	37.35 (14)	6:37.48 (16)	1:49.24 (14)		
NQ15	Marco Weber	Germany	37.74 (18)	6:30.43 (11)	1:50.28 (17)		
NQ16	Luca Stefani	Italy	37.11 (9)	6:35.05 (13)	1:51.64 (23)		
NQ17	Christian Pichler	Austria	37.45 (16)	6:44.91 (22)	1:49.10 (13)		
NQ18	Joel Eriksson	Sweden	37.11 (9)	6:47.41 (23)	1:50.09 (16)		
NQ19	Odd Bohlin Borgersen	Norway	38.07 (22)	6:35.81 (14)	1:51.28 (21)		
NQ20	Johan Röjler	Sweden	38.00 (21)	6:39.21 (17)	1:50.99 (19)		
NQ21	Vitaly Mikhailov	Belarus	37.20 (11)	6:48.45 (25)	1:51.01 (20)		
NQ22	Milan Sáblík	Czech Republic	37.82 (19)	6:44.77 (21)	1:51.92 (24)		
NQ23	Roger Schneider	Switzerland	38.37 (25)	6:42.54 (20)	1:52.45 (25)		
NQ24	Pascal Briand	France	38.70 (27)	6:47.85 (24)	1:50.81 (18)		
NQ25	Robert Brandt	Finland	38.53 (26)	6:59.49 (29)	1:53.41 (26)		
NQ26	Marian Cristian Ion	Romania	38.90 (28)	6:54.16 (27)	1:54.21 (28)		
NQ27	Slawomir Chmura Hmura	Poland	41.38 (32)	6:42.43 (19)	1:53.98 (27)		
NQ28	Kris Schildermans	Belgium	40.42 (29)	6:50.29 (26)	1:55.42 (30)		
NQ29	Szabolcs Szőllősi	Hungary	38.34 (24)	7:14.79 (32)	1:57.74 (32)		
NQ30	Igor Dziuba	Ukraine	40.61 (30)	6:56.18 (28)	1:56.62 (31)		
NQ31	Roman Smirnov	Belarus	38.07 (22)	7:29.63 (33)	1:54.60 (29)		
NQ32	Asier Pena Iturria	Spain	40.92 (31)	7:06.26 (30)	1:58.24 (33)		
DQ-	Jarmo Valtonen	Finland	DQ (33)	7:13.40 (31)	1:51.62 (22)		

NQ = Not qualified for the 10000 m (only the best 12 are qualified)
DNS = Did not start
DQ = Disqualified

Source: ISU

== Women's championships ==
=== Day 1 ===
==== 500 metres ====
Place	Athlete	Country	Time
1st place, gold medalist(s)	Yekaterina Lobysheva	Russia	39.24
2nd place, silver medalist(s)	Marrit Leenstra	Netherlands	39.26
3rd place, bronze medalist(s)	Paulien van Deutekom	Netherlands	39.40
4	Ireen Wüst	Netherlands	39.40
5	Claudia Pechstein	Germany	39.52

==== 3000 metres ====
Place	Athlete	Country	Time
1st place, gold medalist(s)	Martina Sáblíková	Czech Republic	4:01.67
2nd place, silver medalist(s)	Ireen Wüst	Netherlands	4:02.14
3rd place, bronze medalist(s)	Paulien van Deutekom	Netherlands	4:03.40
4	Claudia Pechstein	Germany	4:04.66
5	Daniela Anschütz-Thoms	Germany	4:04.71

=== Day 2 ===
==== 1500 metres ====
Place	Athlete	Country	Time
1st place, gold medalist(s)	Ireen Wüst	Netherlands	1:56.88
2nd place, silver medalist(s)	Paulien van Deutekom	Netherlands	1:57.07
3rd place, bronze medalist(s)	Marrit Leenstra	Netherlands	1:57.24
4	Claudia Pechstein	Germany	1:57.28
5	Daniela Anschütz-Thoms	Germany	1:57.91

==== 5000 metres ====
Place	Athlete	Country	Time
1st place, gold medalist(s)	Martina Sáblíková	Czech Republic	6:53.42
2nd place, silver medalist(s)	Ireen Wüst	Netherlands	6:57.87
3rd place, bronze medalist(s)	Paulien van Deutekom	Netherlands	7:02.40
4	Claudia Pechstein	Germany	7:05.84
5	Daniela Anschütz-Thoms	Germany	7:09.68

=== Allround results ===
Place	Athlete	Country	500 m	3000 m	1500 m	5000 m	Points
1st place, gold medalist(s)	Ireen Wüst	Netherlands	39.43 (4)	4:02.14 (2)	1:56.88 (1)	6:57.87 (2)	160.533
2nd place, silver medalist(s)	Paulien van Deutekom	Netherlands	39.40 (3)	4:03.40 (3)	1:57.07 (2)	7:02.40 (3)	161.229
3rd place, bronze medalist(s)	Martina Sáblíková	Czech Republic	40.58 (11)	4:01.67 (1)	1:58.48 (6)	6:53.42 (1)	161.693
4	Claudia Pechstein	Germany	39.52 (5)	4:04.66 (4)	1:57.28 (4)	7:05.84 (4)	161.973
5	Daniela Anschütz-Thoms	Germany	39.79 (7)	4:04.71 (5)	1:57.91 (5)	7:09.68 (5)	162.846
6	Marrit Leenstra	Netherlands	39.26 (2)	4:08.34 (7)	1:57.24 (3)	7:16.55 (7)	163.385
7	Renate Groenewold	Netherlands	40.78 (12)	4:05.14 (6)	2:00.27 (10)	7:12.60 (6)	164.986
8	Katarzyna Wójcicka	Poland	40.13 (8)	4:09.50 (8)	1:59.83 (7)	7:25.37 (9)	166.193
9	Katrin Mattscherodt	Germany	41.28 (17)	4:10.19 (9)	2:00.00 (8)	7:17.53 (8)	166.731
10	Yekaterina Lobysheva	Russia	39.24 (1)	4:13.18 (13)	2:00.59 (11)	7:36.04 (11)	167.236
11	Lucille Opitz	Germany	40.85 (14)	4:12.26 (11)	2:01.54 (13)	7:25.87 (10)	167.993
12	Galina Likhachova	Russia	40.17 (9)	4:15.39 (15)	2:00.15 (9)	7:37.24 (12)	168.509
NQ13	Yekaterina Abramova	Russia	39.73 (6)	4:20.84 (17)	2:00.71 (12)		
NQ14	Maren Haugli	Norway	41.39 (18)	4:10.99 (10)	2:02.34 (14)		
NQ15	Anna Rokita	Austria	41.01 (16)	4:13.09 (12)	2:03.31 (16)		
NQ16	Mari Hemmer	Norway	41.60 (20)	4:15.23 (14)	2:03.42 (17)		
NQ17	Natalia Czerwonka	Poland	40.57 (10)	4:20.87 (18)	2:04.49 (19)		
NQ18	Daniela Oltean	Romania	41.54 (19)	4:18.66 (16)	2:03.00 (15)		
NQ19	Yuliya Yasenok	Belarus	40.86 (15)	4:22.97 (22)	2:04.62 (20)		
NQ20	Marita Johansson	Sweden	42.88 (23)	4:22.85 (21)	2:05.91 (21)		
NQ21	Yelena Myagkikh	Ukraine	41.77 (21)	4:30.73 (23)	2:07.08 (23)		
NQ22	Andrea Jirků	Czech Republic	43.98 (24)	4:22.08 (19)	2:06.35 (22)		
NQ23	Cathrine Grage	Denmark	44.15 (25)	4:22.13 (20)	2:08.11 (24)		
NQ24	Ágota Tóth	Hungary	41.92 (22)	4:34.60 (24)	2:10.82 (25)		
DQ-	Bianca Anghel	Romania	40.84 (13)	DQ (25)	2:04.16 (18)		

NQ = Not qualified for the 5000 m (only the best 12 are qualified)
DQ = Disqualified
DNS = Did not start

Source: ISU

== Rules ==
All participating skaters are allowed to skate the first three distances; 12 skaters may take part on the fourth distance. These 12 skaters are determined by taking the standings on the longest of the first three distances, as well as the samalog standings after three distances, and comparing these lists as follows:

1. Skaters among the top 12 on both lists are qualified.
2. To make up a total of 12, skaters are then added in order of their best rank on either list. Samalog standings take precedence over the longest-distance standings in the event of a tie.

== See also ==
- 2008 World Allround Speed Skating Championships
