= 2009 European Speed Skating Championships =

International speed skating competition

European Speed Skating Championships
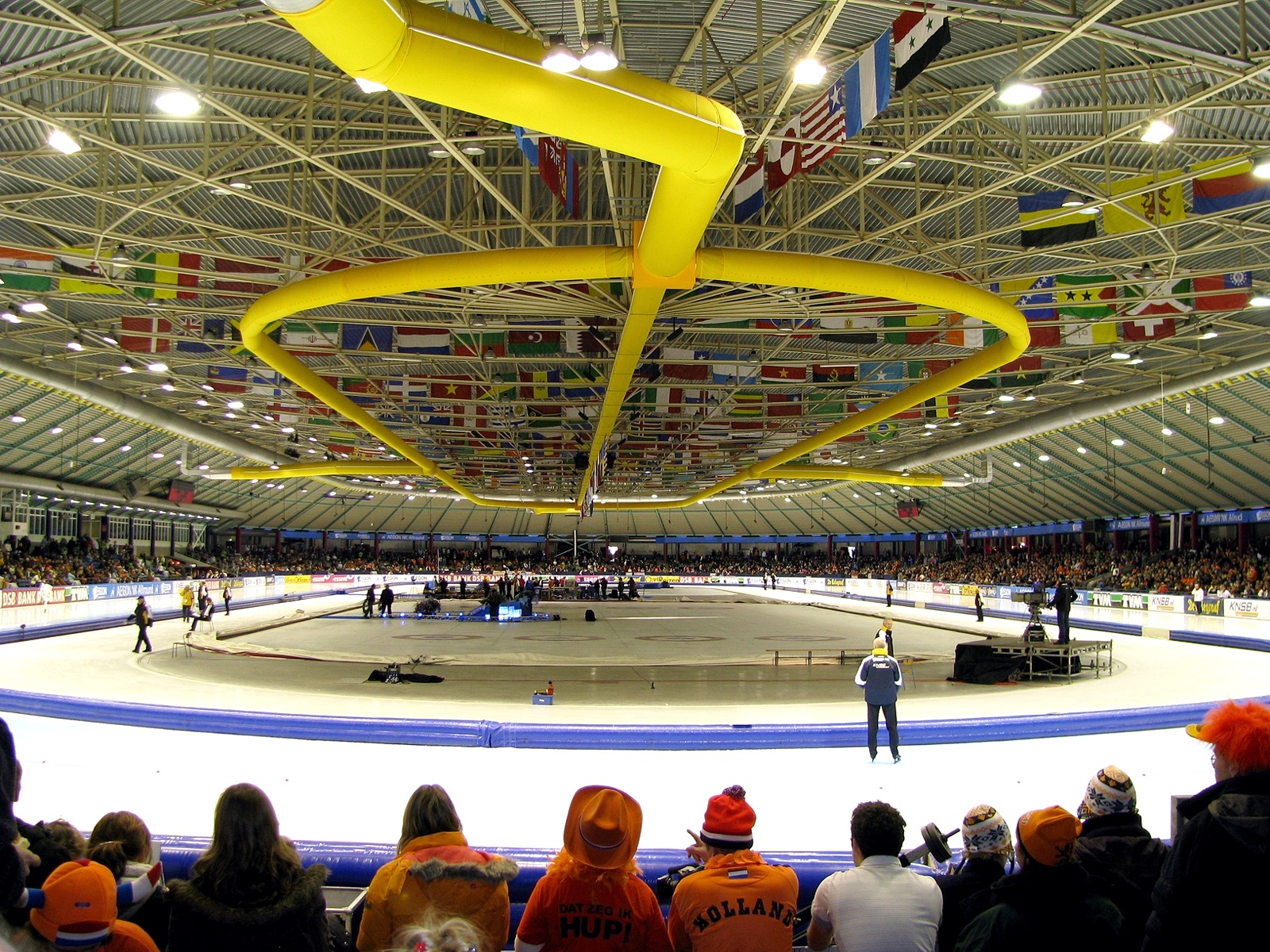
- Thialf (Heerenveen)
- Venue: Thialf (Heerenveen)
- Dates: 9–11 January 2009
- Competitors: 31 men 28 women

Medalist men
1st place, gold medalist(s)		Sven Kramer	NED
2nd place, silver medalist(s)		Håvard Bøkko	NOR
3rd place, bronze medalist(s)		Wouter olde Heuvel	NED

Medalist women
1st place, gold medalist(s)		Claudia Pechstein	GER
2nd place, silver medalist(s)		Daniela Anschütz-Thoms	GER
3rd place, bronze medalist(s)		Martina Sáblíková	CZE

The 2009 European Speed Skating Championships were held at the indoor ice rink of the Thialf in Heerenveen (the Netherlands) on 9–11 January 2009.

== Men's championships ==
=== Allround results ===
Place	Athlete	Country	500 m	5000 m	1500 m	10000 m	Points
1st place, gold medalist(s)	Sven Kramer	Netherlands	36.47 (5)	6:15.76 (1)	1:46.53 (1)	13:00.16 (1)	148.564
2nd place, silver medalist(s)	Håvard Bøkko	Norway	37.36 (15)	6:18.51 (2)	1:47.47 (5)	13:09.23 (2)	150.495
3rd place, bronze medalist(s)	Wouter olde Heuvel	Netherlands	36.72 (8)	6:21.84 (3)	1:47.44 (4)	13:18.25 (4)	150.629
4	Ivan Skobrev	Russia	36.68 (7)	6:30.22 (7)	1:47.97 (6)	13:19.85 (5)	151.684
5	Carl Verheijen	Netherlands	37.71 (19)	6:25.52 (5)	1:48.88 (10)	13:18.11 (3)	152.460
6	Robert Lehmann	Germany	36.34 (3)	6:36.29 (11)	1:48.48 (9)	13:44.84 (10)	153.304
7	Sverre Haugli	Norway	37.97 (21)	6:25.11 (4)	1:50.00 (15)	13:28.79 (7)	153.586
8	Tobias Schneider	Germany	37.09 (12)	6:35.17 (10)	1:49.26 (11)	13:35.70 (9)	153.812
9	Konrad Niedźwiedzki	Poland	36.25 (2)	6:44.89 (17)	1:48.27 (8)	14:07.05 (11)	155.181
10	Yevgeny Lalenkov	Russia	36.20 (1)	6:47.96 (20)	1:46.62 (2)	14:35.33 (12)	156.302
11	Øystein Grødum	Norway	39.88 (27)	6:32.56 (8)	1:53.51 (22)	13:26.84 (6)	157.314
12	Koen Verweij	Netherlands	1:06.95 (31)	6:29.91 (6)	1:48.24 (7)	13:35.07 (8)	182:774
NQ13	Joel Eriksson	Sweden	36.45 (4)	6:47.50 (18)	1:49.50 (13)		113.700
NQ14	Johan Röjler	Sweden	37.41 (16)	6:39.93 (13)	1:50.14 (16)		114.116
NQ15	Alexis Contin	France	37.81 (20)	6:38.74 (12)	1:49.45 (12)		114.167
NQ16	Matteo Anesi	Italy	36.94 (10)	6:47.70 (19)	1:49.86 (14)		114.330
NQ17	Andrey Burlyaev	Russia	37.35 (14)	6:49.09 (21)	1:50.55 (17)		115.109
NQ18	Marco Cignini	Italy	37.63 (18)	6:49.95 (22)	1:50.69 (18)		115.521
NQ19	Marco Weber	Germany	38.21 (23)	6:40.35 (14)	1:52.30 (20)		115.678
NQ20	Vitaly Mikhaylov	Belarus	37.46 (17)	6:55.54 (25)	1:52.40 (21)		116.480
NS21	Sławomir Chmura	Poland	39.24 (25)	6:34.08 (9)	1:53.89 (24)		116.611
NQ22	Milan Sáblík	Czech Republic	38.19 (22)	6:53.08 (23)	1:53.54 (23)		117.341
NQ23	Marian Christian Ion	Romania	38.95 (24)	6:53.54 (24)	1:54.41 (25)		118.440
NQ24	Philip Brojaka	United Kingdom	37.06 (11)	7:23.55 (28)	1:52.25 (19)		118.831
NQ25	Jan Caflisch	Switzerland	40.31 (28)	7:07.21 (26)	2:00.27 (29)		123.121
NQ26	Asier Peña Iturria	Spain	40.99 (30)	7:17.54 (27)	2:00.20 (27)		124.810
NQ27	Szabolcs Szőllősi	Hungary	40.42 (29)	7:24.00 (29)	2:00.20 (27)		124.886
DQ2	Enrico Fabris	Italy	36.55 (6)	DQ	1:46.68 (3)		
DQ2	Jarmo Valtonen	Finland	37.12 (13)	DQ	1:54.41 (25)		
DQ3	Lars Kvaalen	Norway	36.79 (9)	6:44.87 (16)	DQ		
DQ3	Kris Schildermans	Belgium	39.80 (26)	6:43.48 (15)	DQ		

NQ = Not qualified for the 10000 m (only the best 12 are qualified)
DQ = Disqualified

Source: ISU

== Women's championships ==
=== Allround results ===
Place	Athlete	Country	500 m	3000 m	1500 m	5000 m	Points
1st place, gold medalist(s)	Claudia Pechstein	Germany	39.74 (2)	4:04.41 (1)	1:57.72 (2)	7:02.99 (2)	162.014
2nd place, silver medalist(s)	Daniela Anschütz-Thoms	Germany	40.00 (3)	4:04.97 (2)	1:57.21 (1)	7:04.09 (3)	162.307
3rd place, bronze medalist(s)	Martina Sáblíková	Czech Republic	40.90 (12)	4:05.34 (4)	1:59.12 (6)	6:53.19 (1)	162.815
4	Paulien van Deutekom	Netherlands	40.04 (4)	4:05.24 (3)	1:58.12 (3)	7:08.33 (7)	163.119
5	Renate Groenewold	Netherlands	40.73 (10)	4:07.52 (5)	1:58.66 (5)	7:04.34 (4)	163.965
6	Ireen Wüst	Netherlands	40.19 (6)	4:11.36 (7)	1:58.28 (4)	7:05.34 (5)	164.043
7	Elma de Vries	Netherlands	40.47 (8)	4:13.42 (10)	2:00.97 (9)	7:14.35 (9)	166.454
8	Katarzyna Wójcicka	Poland	40.88 (11)	4:12.92 (9)	2:00.69 (8)	7:19.00 (11)	167.163
9	Maren Haugli	Norway	41.42 (17)	4:12.20 (8)	2:01.28 (10)	7:13.05 (8)	167.184
10	Anna Rokita	Austria	41.37 (18)	4:14.64 (12)	2:02.33 (11)	7:18.77 (10)	168.853
11	Lucille Opitz	Germany	41:09 (13)	4:13.78 (11)	2:02.52 (14)	7:26.27 (12)	168.853
12	Stephanie Beckert	Germany	43.62 (26)	4:10.08 (6)	2:04.79 (20)	7:06.98 (6)	169.594
NQ13	Alla Shabanova	Russia	39.58 (1)	4:17.12 (13)	1:59.81 (7)		122:369
NQ14	Yekaterina Abramova (4)	Russia	40.18 (5)	4:26.10 (18)	2:02.63 (15)		125.406
NQ15	Hege Bøkko	Norway	40.42 (7)	4:25.29 (17)	2:02.43 (13)		125.445
NQ16	Luiza Złotkowska	Poland	41.27 (16)	4:21.12 (14)	2:02.82 (16)		125.730
NQ17	Mari Hemmer	Norway	41.69 (20)	4:21.53 (15)	2:03.09 (18)		126.308
NQ18	Karolína Erbanová	Czech Republic	41.12 (14)	4:26.64 (19)	2:02.36 (12)		126.346
NQ19	Daniela Dumitru	Romania	41.66 (19)	4:30.34 (22)	2:07.02 (21)		129.056
NQ20	Marita Johansson	Sweden	43.06 (24)	4:28.19 (20)	2:04.08 (19)		129.118
NQ21	Yuliya Yasenok	Belarus	41.26 (15)	4:34.86 (25)	2:07.49 (22)		129.566
NQ22	Olena Myagkikh	Ukraine	41.85 (21)	4:33.15 (24)	2:07.67 (24)		129.931
NQ23	Daniela Oltean	Romania	42.69 (23)	4:30.67 (23)	2:07.61 (23)		130.337
NQ24	Emma Andersson	Sweden	42.34 (22)	4:38.30 (26)	2:08.33 (25)		131.499
NQ25	Anna Badayeva	Belarus	40.61 (9)	4:50.19 (28)	2:08.61 (26)		131.845
NQ26	Cathrine Grage	Denmark	45.04 (27)	4:28.38 (21)	2:11.16 (27)		133.490
NQ27	Ágota Tóth	Hungary	43.09 (25)	4:39.75 (27)	2:15.17 (28)		134.771
DQ1	Yekaterina Shikhova	Russia	DQ	4:23.23 (16)	2:03.00 (17)		

NQ = Not qualified for the 5000 m (only the best 12 are qualified)
DQ = Disqualified

Source: ISU

== Rules ==
All 24 participating skaters are allowed to skate the first three distances; 12 skaters may take part on the fourth distance. These 12 skaters are determined by taking the standings on the longest of the first three distances, as well as the samalog standings after three distances, and comparing these lists as follows:

1. Skaters among the top 12 on both lists are qualified.
2. To make up a total of 12, skaters are then added in order of their best rank on either list. Samalog standings take precedence over the longest-distance standings in the event of a tie.

== See also ==
- 2009 World Allround Speed Skating Championships
