= 2010 European Speed Skating Championships =

International speed skating competition

European Speed Skating Championships
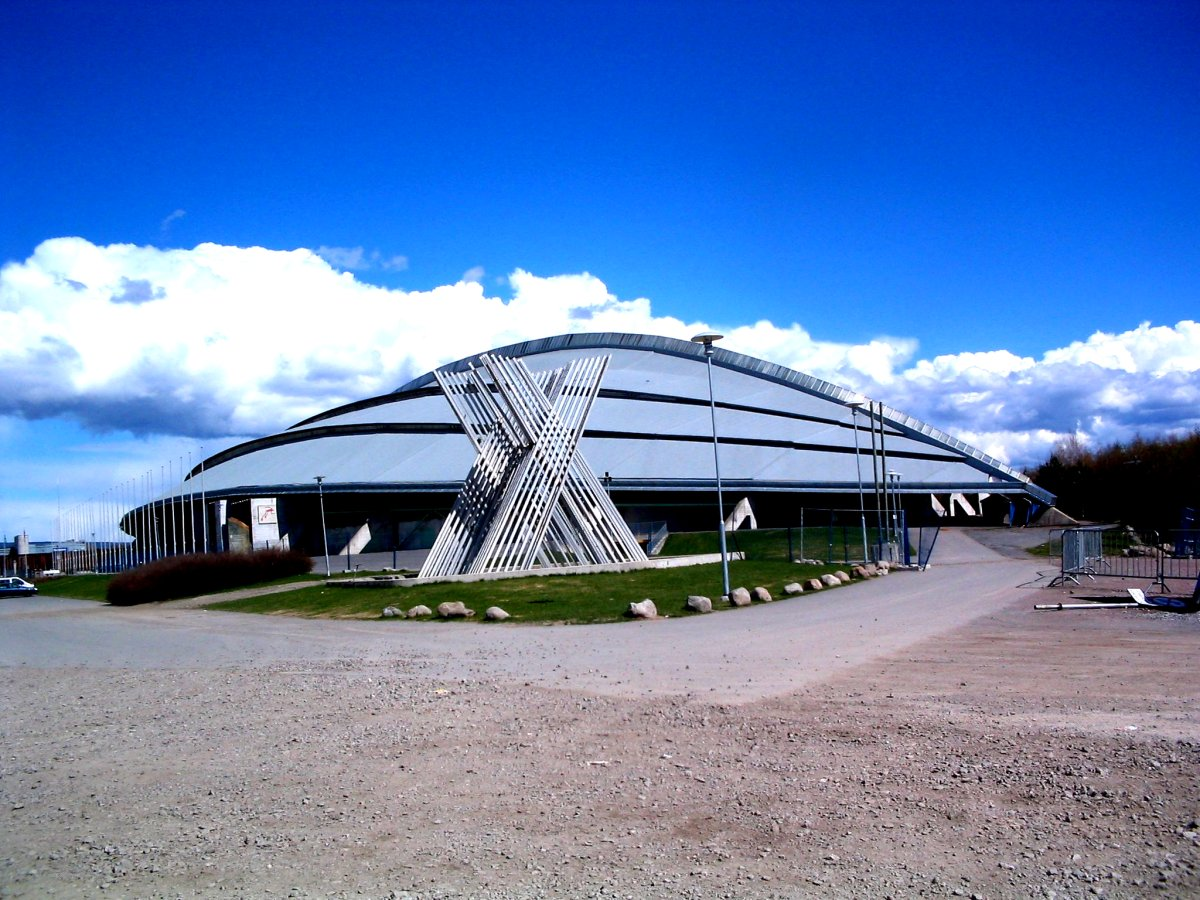
- Vikingskipet (Hamar)
- Venue: Vikingskipet (Hamar)
- Dates: 9 and 10 January 2010
- Competitors: 32 men 26 women

Medalist men
1st place, gold medalist(s)		Sven Kramer	NED
2nd place, silver medalist(s)		Enrico Fabris	ITA
3rd place, bronze medalist(s)		Ivan Skobrev	RUS

Medalist women
1st place, gold medalist(s)		Martina Sáblíková	CZE
2nd place, silver medalist(s)		Ireen Wüst	NED
3rd place, bronze medalist(s)		Daniela Anschütz-Thoms	GER

The 2010 European Speed Skating Championships were held at the indoor ice rink of the Vikingskipet in Hamar (Norway) on 9 and 10 January 2010.

== Men championships ==
=== Allround results ===
Place	Athlete	Country	500 m	5000 m	1500 m	10000 m	Points
1st place, gold medalist(s)	Sven Kramer	Netherlands	36.60 (4)	6:19.78 (1)	1:47.05 (2)	13:19.32 (1)	150.227
2nd place, silver medalist(s)	Enrico Fabris	Italy	36.64 (5)	6:22.44 (2)	1:46.37 (1)	13:28.72 (3)	150.776
3rd place, bronze medalist(s)	Ivan Skobrev	Russia	36.76 (9)	6:28.27 (6)	1:47.82 (3)	13:33.02 (5)	152.178
4	Alexis Contin	France	37.30 (13)	6:25.70 (3)	1:49.27 (8)	13:25.77 (2)	152.581
5	Jan Blokhuijsen	Netherlands	36.66 (7)	6:27.95 (4)	1:50.33 (17)	13:31.12 (4)	152.787
6	Wouter olde Heuvel	Netherlands	37.07 (11)	6:32.76 (8)	1:48.31 (4)	13:45.60 (7)	153.729
7	Henrik Christiansen	Norway	37.81 (21)	6:30.40 (7)	1:49.25 (7)	13:41.17 (6)	154.324
8	Renz Rotteveel	Netherlands	37.30 (13)	6:33.89 (9)	1:49.57 (13)	13:50.03 (9)	154.713
9	Konrad Niedźwiedzki	Poland	36.07 (1)	6:40.83 (16)	1:48.67 (5)	14:08.75 (10)	154.813
10	Sverre Haugli	Norway	38.19 (23)	6:28.21 (5)	1:50.13 (16)	13:45.80 (8)	155.011
11	Joel Eriksson	Sweden	36.65 (6)	6:38.77 (13)	1:48.74 (6)	14:13.68 (11)	155.457
12	Matteo Anesi	Italy	36.52 (2)	6:43.13 (18)	1:49.37 (10)	14:26.47 (12)	156.612
NQ13	Robert Lehmann	Germany	36.70 (8)	6:40.84 (17)	1:49.55 (12)		113.300
NQ14	Haralds Silovs	Latvia	37.14 (12)	6:39.26 (14)	1:49.34 (9)		113.512
NQ15	Johan Röjler	Sweden	37.32 (15)	6:38.15 (11)	1:49.84 (15)		113.748
NQ16	Zbigniew Bródka	Poland	36.86 (10)	6:46.54 (20)	1:49.42 (11)		113.987
NQ17	Daniel Friberg	Sweden	36.56 (3)	6:58.56 (28)	1:49.58 (14)		114.942
NQ18	Pascal Briand	France	37.68 (20)	6:50.59 (21)	1:51.70 (18)		115.972
NQ19	Patrick Beckert	Germany	37.89 (22)	6:44.63 (19)	1:52.86 (25)		115.973
NQ20	Aleksandr Rumyantsev	Russia	38.74 (26)	6:38.22 (12)	1:52.24 (21)		115.975
NQ21	Marco Weber	Germany	38.60 (25)	6:40.38 (15)	1:52.80 (24)		116.238
NQ22	Milan Sáblík	Czech Republic	37.63 (18)	6:53.64 (23)	1:52.09 (19)		116.357
NQ23	Christian Pichler	Austria	37.47 (16)	6:58.06 (27)	1:52.14 (20)		116.656
NQ24	Niko Räsänen	Finland	38.56 (24)	6:51.91 (22)	1:52.60 (23)		117.284
NQ25	Vitaly Mikhailov	Belarus	37.66 (19)	6:56.19 (25)	1:54.24 (26)		117.359
NQ26	Marian Cristian Ion	Romania	39.15 (27)	6:56.37 (26)	1:55.75 (27)		119.370
NQ27	Kris Schildermans	Belgium	40.01 (28)	6:55.08 (24)	1:56.91 (28)		120.488
NQ28	Jan Caflisch	Switzerland	40.75 (29)	7:09.18 (30)	1:59.47 (29)		123.491
NQ29	Asier Pena Iturria	Spain	40.86 (30)	7:18.91 (31)	1:59.92 (30)		124.724
NQ31	Fredrik van der Horst	Norway	37.56 (17)	6:34.50 (10)	DNS		77.724
NQ32	Håvard Bøkko	Norway	1:14.68 (32)	DNS			74.680

NQ = Not qualified for the 10000 m (only the best 12 are qualified)
DNS = Did not start

Source: ISU

== Female championships ==
=== Allround results ===
Place	Athlete	Country	500 m	3000 m	1500 m	5000 m	Points
1st place, gold medalist(s)	Martina Sáblíková	Czech Republic	40.45 (7)	4:03.09 (1)	1:59.75 (3)	6:59.44 (1)	162.825
2nd place, silver medalist(s)	Ireen Wüst	Netherlands	39.77 (4)	4:08.40 (2)	1:59.08 (1)	7:13.41 (5)	164.204
3rd place, bronze medalist(s)	Daniela Anschütz-Thoms	Germany	40.74 (10)	4:09.27 (4)	1:59.57 (2)	7:12.02 (3)	165.343
4	Yekaterina Lobysheva	Russia	39.81 (5)	4:14.75 (8)	2:00.08 (6)	7:27.02 (8)	166.996
5	Maren Haugli	Norway	41.67 (18)	4:09.49 (5)	2:01.67 (10)	7:12.81 (4)	167.088
6	Diane Valkenburg	Netherlands	40.77 (11)	4:11.80 (6)	2:00.80 (7)	7:21.61 (6)	167.163
7	Jorien Voorhuis	Netherlands	40.83 (12)	4:13.69 (7)	2:01.78 (11)	7:22.93 (7)	167.947
8	Yekaterina Shikhova	Russia	39.56 (2)	4:20.74 (18)	1:59.77 (4)	7:35.83 (11)	168.522
9	Karolína Erbanová	Czech Republic	39.54 (1)	4:19.93 (17)	2:00.05 (5)	7:36.65 (12)	168.542
10	Stephanie Beckert	Germany	43.43 (26)	4:08.76 (3)	2:03.77 (19)	7:04.55 (2)	168.598
11	Katarzyna Bachleda-Curuś	Poland	40.59 (9)	4:17.45 (12)	2:00.99 (8)	7:33.58 (10)	169.182
12	Paulien van Deutekom	Netherlands	40.43 (6)	4:15.20 (9)	2:02.60 (16)	7:30.65 (9)	169.228
NQ13	Hege Bøkko	Norway	39.76 (3)	4:21.11 (20)	2:02.23 (13)		124.021
NQ14	Luiza Złotkowska	Poland	41.23 (14)	4:16.03 (11)	2:01.41 (9)		124.371
NQ15	Katarzyna Woźniak	Poland	40.89 (13)	4:17.74 (13)	2:01.87 (12)		124.469
NQ16	Anna Rokita	Austria	41.33 (16)	4:15.89 (10)	2:02.58 (15)		124.838
NQ17	Ida Njåtun	Norway	40.58 (8)	4:21.99 (21)	2:02.24 (14)		124.991
NQ18	Isabell Ost	Germany	41.32 (15)	4:21.07 (19)	2:02.63 (17)		125.707
NQ19	Svetlana Vysokova	Russia	41.36 (17)	4:18.96 (15)	2:03.94 (20)		125.826
NQ 20	Katrin Mattscherodt	Germany	42.03 (20)	4:18.31 (14)	2:03.11 (18)		126.117
NQ21	Cathrine Grage	Denmark	43.13 (25)	4:19.33 (16)	2:04.81 (21)		127.964
NQ22	Yulia Yasenok	Belarus	41.87 (19)	4:31.62 (23)	2:06.22 (22)		129.213
NQ23	Marita Johansson	Sweden	42.75 (23)	4:31.10 (22)	2:06.58 (23)		130.126
NQ24	Olena Myahkikh	Ukraine	42.50 (22)	4:35.79 (24)	2:09.22 (24)		131.538
NQ25	Daniela Oltean	Romania	42.92 (24)	4:43.05 (25)	2:11.09 (25)		133.791
NQ26	Ágota Tóth	Hungary	42.23 (21)	4:46.73 (26)	2:14.08 (26)		134.878

NQ = Not qualified for the 5000 m (only the best 12 are qualified)
DNS = Did not start

Source: ISU

== Rules ==
All 24 participating skaters are allowed to skate the first three distances; 12 skaters may take part on the fourth distance. These 12 skaters are determined by taking the standings on the longest of the first three distances, as well as the samalog standings after three distances, and comparing these lists as follows:

1. Skaters among the top 12 on both lists are qualified.
2. To make up a total of 12, skaters are then added in order of their best rank on either list. Samalog standings take precedence over the longest-distance standings in the event of a tie.

== See also ==
- 2010 World Allround Speed Skating Championships
- Speed skating at the 2010 Winter Olympics
