= 2007 European Speed Skating Championships =

International speed skating competition

European Speed Skating Championships
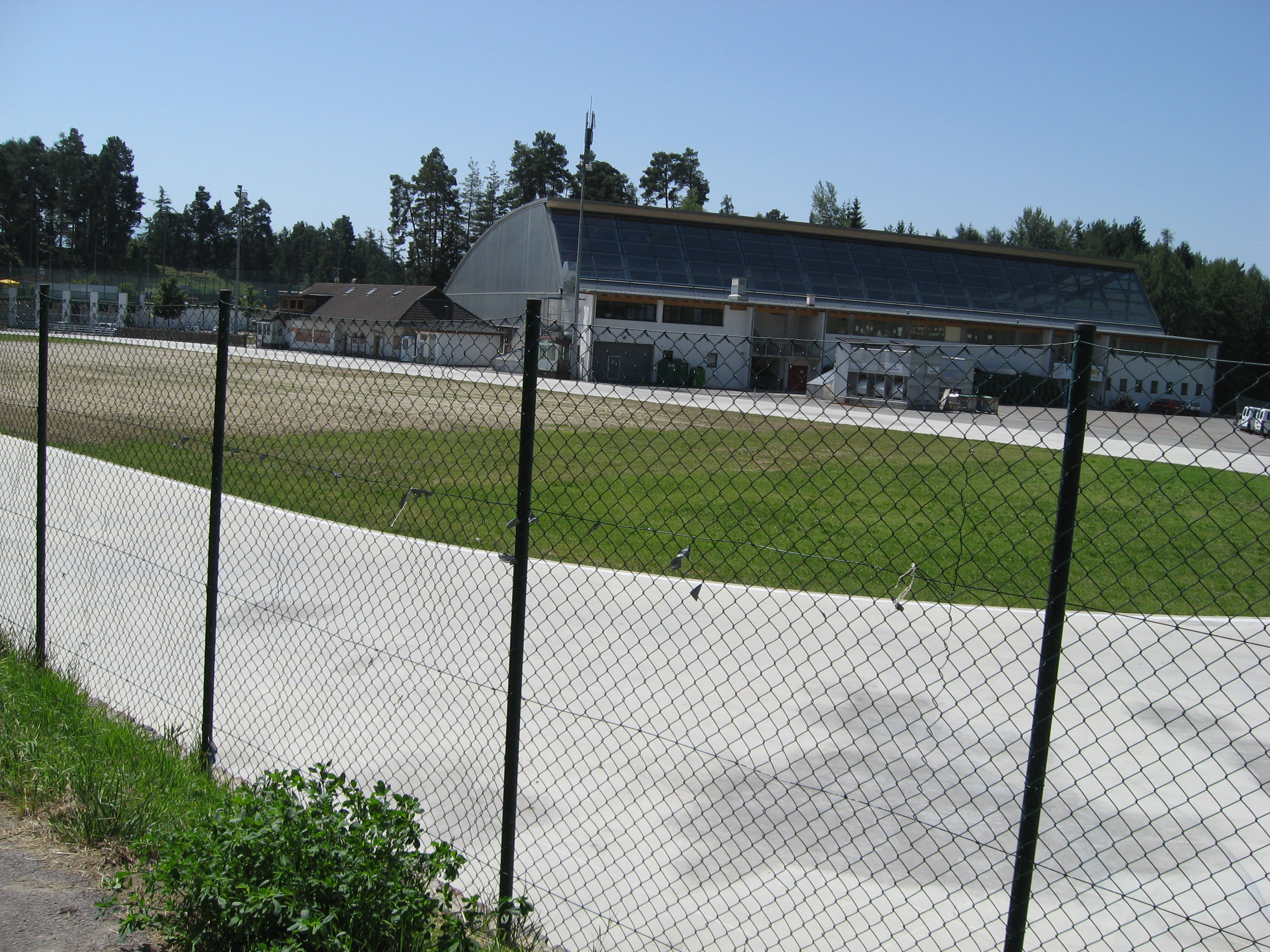
- Arena Ritten/Ritten Kunsteisbahn (Collalbo)
- Venue: Arena Ritten (Collalbo)
- Dates: 18 and 19 March 2006
- Competitors: 31 men 27 women

Medalist men
1st place, gold medalist(s)		Sven Kramer	NED
2nd place, silver medalist(s)		Enrico Fabris	ITA
3rd place, bronze medalist(s)		Carl Verheijen	NED

Medalist women
1st place, gold medalist(s)		Martina Sáblíková	CZE
2nd place, silver medalist(s)		Ireen Wüst	NED
3rd place, bronze medalist(s)		Renate Groenewold	NED

The 2007 European Speed Skating Championships were held on the outdoor artificial ice track Arena Ritten in Collalbo, Italy. The Championships were three-day allround events, with the skaters completing four distances before the final championship standings are determined based on the samalog system.

Live broadcasts from the Championships were shown on Nederland 1, NRK and Rai Tre/Rai Sport Sat, with highlights on Das Erste.

The two champions were both below 21 years of age; Sven Kramer won his first European gold medal, two years after winning silver in Thialf, while Czech Martina Sáblíková won the women's championship to become the first Czech to medal at a European championship, and also the youngest European women's champion. Kramer is the youngest European Champion since 1992.

== Rules ==
All skaters were allowed to skate the first three distances; 12 skaters took part on the fourth distance. These were qualified by taking the standings on the longest of the first three distances, as well as the samalog standings after three distances, and comparing these lists as follows:

1. Skaters among the top 12 on both lists were qualified.
2. To make up a total of 12, skaters were then added in order of their best rank on either list. Samalog standings take precedence over longest-distance standings in the event of a tie.

== Final standings ==
=== Men ===
The top six skaters from the 2006 Championships were all present.

Place	Athlete	Country	500 m	5000 m	1500 m	10000 m	points
1st place, gold medalist(s)	Sven Kramer	NED	36.76 ( 5)	6:15.65 ( 1)	1:44.86 ( 2)	13:10.44 ( 1)	148.800
2nd place, silver medalist(s)	Enrico Fabris	ITA	36.38 ( 1)	6:20.28 ( 3)	1:44.72 ( 1)	13:21.51 ( 3)	149.389
3rd place, bronze medalist(s)	Carl Verheijen	NED	37.53 (12)	6:19.67 ( 2)	1:47.34 ( 9)	13:15.37 ( 2)	151.045
4	Håvard Bøkko	NOR	36.99 ( 6)	6:24.41 ( 4)	1:47.10 ( 7)	13:27.38 ( 4)	151.500
5	Ivan Skobrev	RUS	36.39 ( 2)	6:39.28 (13)	1:46.68 ( 4)	13:45.01 ( 9)	153.128
6	Eskil Ervik	NOR	37.96 (16)	6:24.85 ( 5)	1:47.56 (10)	13:36.62 ( 8)	153.129
7	Tobias Schneider	GER	37.48 (11)	6:35.72 (10)	1:47.03 ( 6)	13:34.14 ( 5)	153.435
8	Mark Tuitert	NED	36.60 ( 4)	6:36.79 (11)	1:46.19 ( 3)	14:05.27 (11)	153.938
9	Henrik Christiansen	NOR	38.13 (17)	6:31.12 ( 7)	1:47.87 (12)	13:35.72 ( 6)	153.984
10	Wouter olde Heuvel	NED	37.57 (14)	6:28.96 ( 6)	1:47.60 (11)	13:54.40 (10)	154.052
11	Sverre Haugli	NOR	38.20 (18)	6:31.55 ( 8)	1:48.16 (14)	13:35.92 ( 7)	154.204
12	Matteo Anesi	ITA	37.22 ( 8)	6:38.62 (12)	1:48.85 (15)	14:22.38 (12)	156.484
13	Konrad Niedźwiedzki	POL	36.52 ( 3)	6:47.81 (19)	1:46.96 ( 5)		112.954
14	Stefan Heythausen	GER	37.46 (10)	6:42.44 (15)	1:47.28 ( 8)		113.464
15	Jarmo Valtonen	FIN	37.14 ( 7)	6:48.88 (20)	1:47.94 (13)		114.008
16	Johan Röjler	SWE	38.52 (19)	6:35.46 ( 9)	1:49.68 (17)		114.626
17	Alexis Contin	FRA	37.35 ( 9)	6:44.91 (18)	1:50.43 (18)		114.651
18	Joel Eriksson	SWE	37.55 (13)	6:52.95 (23)	1:49.04 (16)		115.191
19	Vitaly Mikhailov	BLR	37.58 (15)	6:57.52 (25)	1:50.48 (19)		116.158
20	Artyom Belousov	RUS	39.01 (22)	6:43.24 (16)	1:50.91 (20)		116.304
21	Sławomir Chmura	POL	38.78 (21)	6:43.64 (17)	1:52.07 (22)		116.500
22	Alexey Yunin	RUS	39.57 (27)	6:40.83 (14)	1:51.12 (21)		116.693
23	Christian Pichler	AUT	39.30 (26)	6:50.43 (21)	1:52.07 (22)		117.699
24	Witold Mazur	POL	39.24 (25)	6:51.29 (22)	1:55.13 (27)		118.745
25	Maxim Pedos	UKR	39.16 (24)	7:00.30 (28)	1:52.78 (24)		118.783
26	Oliver Sundberg	DEN	39.02 (23)	7:01.16 (29)	1:54.26 (25)		119.222
27	Martin Hänggi	SUI	38.76 (20)	7:06.32 (30)	1:54.32 (26)		119.498
28	Claudiu Grozea	ROM	39.89 (29)	6:55.74 (24)	1:55.76 (28)		120.050
29	Milan Sáblík	CZE	39.62 (28)	6:59.98 (27)	1:57.06 (29)		120.638
	Kris Schildermans	BEL	DSQ	6:58.42 (26)	1:57.51 (30)		
	Stefano Donagrandi	ITA	DNF				

A placing among the top 16 qualified the nation for the 2007 World Championships as well as the 2008 European Championships (where each federation is automatically entitled to one skater and any additional skaters are added to this quota, with a cap of four.)

=== Women ===
Anni Friesinger, five-time European Champion, withdrew to concentrate on the World Sprint Championships a week later.

At first, the Norwegian Skating Federation selected only Maren Haugli, but included Mari Hemmer and Hedvig Bjelkevik after protests from within the speed skating community. Bjelkevik later declined, citing the same reason as Friesinger.

The top seven skaters from the 2006 Championships were all present.

Place	Athlete	Country	500 m	1500 m	3000 m	5000 m	points
1st place, gold medalist(s)	Martina Sáblíková	CZE	40.97 ( 9)	1:58.66 ( 6)	4:03.52 ( 1)	6:58.45 ( 1)	162.954
2nd place, silver medalist(s)	Ireen Wüst	NED	39.51 ( 1)	1:56.78 ( 1)	4:07.61 ( 3)	7:12.73 ( 6)	162.977
3rd place, bronze medalist(s)	Renate Groenewold	NED	41.05 (10)	1:58.64 ( 5)	4:04.24 ( 2)	7:08.76 ( 2)	164.178
4	Daniela Anschütz-Thoms	GER	40.63 ( 7)	1:58.08 ( 3)	4:08.28 ( 4)	7:10.49 ( 4)	164.419
5	Claudia Pechstein	GER	40.28 ( 4)	1:58.72 ( 7)	4:11.15 ( 6)	7:10.05 ( 3)	164.716
6	Marja Vis	NED	40.65 ( 8)	1:59.56 ( 8)	4:09.99 ( 5)	7:11.77 ( 5)	165.345
7	Paulien van Deutekom	NED	40.51 ( 5)	1:58.34 ( 4)	4:12.79 (10)	7:23.94 (10)	166.481
8	Lucille Opitz	GER	41.16 (12)	1:59.77 (10)	4:12.13 ( 8)	7:17.81 ( 9)	166.885
9	Maren Haugli	NOR	41.13 (11)	2:01.50 (13)	4:11.89 ( 7)	7:14.26 ( 7)	167.037
10	Yekaterina Abramova	RUS	39.91 ( 2)	1:57.98 ( 2)	4:18.79 (13)	7:34.62 (12)	167.829
11	Katarzyna Wójcicka	POL	40.56 ( 6)	1:59.79 (11)	4:16.33 (12)	7:31.08 (11)	168.319
12	Andrea Jirků	CZE	43.46 (26)	2:03.37 (16)	4:12.51 ( 9)	7:17.44 ( 8)	170.412
13	Yekaterina Lobysheva	RUS	40.15 ( 3)	1:59.53 ( 8)	4:20.23 (15)		123.364
14	Katrin Mattscherodt	GER	41.68 (15)	2:02.05 (14)	4:15.13 (11)		124.884
15	Anna Rokita	AUT	41.80 (16)	2:03.12 (15)	4:19.85 (14)		126.148
16	Galina Likhachova	RUS	41.41 (13)	2:00.93 (12)	4:28.57 (24)		126.481
17	Luiza Złotkowska	POL	42.47 (19)	2:04.15 (17)	4:23.85 (18)		127.828
18	Mari Hemmer	NOR	42.24 (17)	2:04.04 (18)	4:23.74 (17)		127.842
19	Oana Opincariu	ROM	42.89 (24)	2:06.20 (22)	4:20.46 (19)		128.366
20	Yekaterina Malysheva	RUS	41.42 (14)	2:05.61 (19)	4:31.96 (25)		128.616
21	Yuliya Yasenok	BLR	42.37 (18)	2:06.04 (21)	4:26.09 (21)		128.731
22	Yelena Myagkikh	UKR	42.51 (20)	2:05.66 (20)	4:26.02 (20)		128.732
23	Marita Johansson	SWE	42.54 (21)	2:06.28 (23)	4:26.85 (23)		129.108
24	Martina Windhager	AUT	43.04 (25)	2:07.38 (25)	4:26.17 (22)		129.861
25	Cathrine Grage	DEN	44.52 (27)	2:06.89 (24)	4:24.55 (19)		130.907
26	Daniela Dumitru	ROM	42.77 (23)	2:07.66 (24)	4:33.57 (26)		130.918
27	Ágota Tóth	HUN	42.76 (22)	2:10.98 (27)	4:39.80 (27)		133.053

The top 14 have qualified their nation for the World Allround Championships. Skaters in the top 16 have given their nation an addition to the basis quota of one skater for the 2008 European Championships, with the quota capped at four skaters per nation.

== Friday's events ==
The competitions began at 13:00 local time.

In the results list, previous European medallists are mentioned, as well as the top ten on each distance.

500 m men

Kramer advanced 13 places from his performance at the 2006 European Championship, and gained 0.8 seconds on Fabris compared to last year's standings. Ervik lost nearly a second, while Bøkko lost half a second and Verheijen gained 0.3 seconds, all compared to the defending champion Fabris. The distance podium is the same as last year, but only Skobrev finished in the same position.

Pos.	Race	Time	Pos.	Allround rankings	Points
1.	Enrico Fabris (ITA)	36.38	1.	Enrico Fabris (ITA)	36.380
2.	Ivan Skobrev (RUS)	36.39	2.	Ivan Skobrev (RUS)	36.390
3.	Konrad Niedźwiedzki (POL)	36.52	3.	Konrad Niedźwiedzki (POL)	36.520
4.	Mark Tuitert (NED)	36.60	4.	Mark Tuitert (NED)	36.600
5.	Sven Kramer (NED)	36.76	5.	Sven Kramer (NED)	36.760
6.	Håvard Bøkko (NOR)	36.99	6.	Håvard Bøkko (NOR)	36.990
7.	Jarmo Valtonen (FIN)	37.14	7.	Jarmo Valtonen (FIN)	37.140
8.	Matteo Anesi (ITA)	37.22	8.	Matteo Anesi (ITA)	37.220
9.	Alexis Contin (FRA)	37.35	9.	Alexis Contin (FRA)	37.350
10.	Stefan Heythausen (GER)	37.46	10.	Stefan Heythausen (GER)	37.460
12.	Carl Verheijen (NED)	37.53	12.	Carl Verheijen (NED)	37.530
16.	Eskil Ervik (NOR)	37.96	16.	Eskil Ervik (NOR)	37.960

500 m women

Abramova, Lobysheva, Pechstein and Wójcicka all finished in the same order as in Hamar last year, with Abramova gaining a few hundredths of a second. However, Wüst gains over 1.2 seconds on those three compared to last year's performance, where she finished 0.79 500 m-seconds behind Pechstein in the overall standings. Groenewold finishes 0.77 seconds behind Pechstein, gaining 0.13 on 2006.

Pos.	Race	Time	Pos.	Allround rankings	Points
1.	Ireen Wüst (NED)	39.51	1.	Ireen Wüst (NED)	39.510
2.	Yekaterina Abramova (RUS)	39.91	2.	Yekaterina Abramova (RUS)	39.910
3.	Yekaterina Lobysheva (RUS)	40.15	3.	Yekaterina Lobysheva (RUS)	40.150
4.	Claudia Pechstein (GER)	40.28	4.	Claudia Pechstein (GER)	40.280
5.	Paulien van Deutekom (NED)	40.51	5.	Paulien van Deutekom (NED)	40.510
6.	Katarzyna Wójcicka (POL)	40.56	6.	Katarzyna Wójcicka (POL)	40.560
7.	Daniela Anschütz-Thoms (GER)	40.63	7.	Daniela Anschütz-Thoms (GER)	40.630
8.	Marja Vis (NED)	40.65	8.	Marja Vis (NED)	40.650
9.	Martina Sáblíková (CZE)	40.97	9.	Martina Sáblíková (CZE)	40.970
10.	Renate Groenewold (NED)	41.05	10.	Renate Groenewold (NED)	41.050

5000 m men

The previous outdoor world best, by Chad Hedrick from the 2005 World Single Distance Championships, was bettered by 9.96 seconds. Verheijen was the first to beat the record, in the 12th of the 15 pairs, before Kramer lowered it by a further four seconds in the 13th pair, recording nine of twelve laps below 30 seconds.

Pos.	Race	Time	Pos.	Allround rankings	Points
1.	Sven Kramer (NED)	6:15.65	1.	Sven Kramer (NED)	74.325
2.	Carl Verheijen (NED)	6:19.67	2.	Enrico Fabris (ITA)	74.408
3.	Enrico Fabris (ITA)	6:20.28	3.	Håvard Bøkko (NOR)	75.431
4.	Håvard Bøkko (NOR)	6:24.41	4.	Carl Verheijen (NED)	75.497
5.	Eskil Ervik (NOR)	6:24.85	5.	Mark Tuitert (NED)	76.279
6.	Wouter olde Heuvel (NED)	6:28.96	6.	Ivan Skobrev (RUS)	76.318
7.	Henrik Christiansen (NOR)	6:31.12	7.	Eskil Ervik (NOR)	76.445
8.	Sverre Haugli (NOR)	6:31.55	8.	Wouter olde Heuvel (NED)	76.466
9.	Johan Röjler (SWE)	6:35.46	9.	Tobias Schneider (GER)	77.052
10.	Tobias Schneider (GER)	6:35.72	10.	Matteo Anesi (ITA)	77.082
11.	Mark Tuitert (NED)	6:36.79	11.	Henrik Christiansen (NOR)	77.242

== Saturday's events ==
The competitions began at 13:00 local time.

1500 m women

Wüst and Abramova finished first and second once more, with exactly the same difference in samalog points, while defending champion Pechstein, whose best World Cup ranking is in the long distance cup, advanced to third place in the allround rankings despite recording a worse placing here than on the 500 metres.

Pos.	Race	Time	Pos.	Allround rankings	Points
1.	Ireen Wüst (NED)	1:56.78	1.	Ireen Wüst (NED)	78.436
2.	Yekaterina Abramova (RUS)	1:57.98	2.	Yekaterina Abramova (RUS)	79.236
3.	Daniela Anschütz-Thoms (GER)	1:58.08	3.	Claudia Pechstein (GER)	79.853
4.	Paulien van Deutekom (NED)	1:58.34	4.	Paulien van Deutekom (NED)	79.956
5.	Renate Groenewold (NED)	1:58.64	5.	Daniela Anschütz-Thoms (GER)	79.990
6.	Martina Sáblíková (CZE)	1:58.66	6.	Yekaterina Lobysheva (RUS)	79.993
7.	Claudia Pechstein (GER)	1:58.72	7.	Katarzyna Wójcicka (POL)	80.490
8.	Yekaterina Lobysheva (RUS)	1:59.53	8.	Marja Vis (NED)	80.503
9.	Marja Vis (NED)	1:59.56	9.	Martina Sáblíková (CZE)	80.523
10.	Lucille Opitz (GER)	1:59.77	10.	Renate Groenewold (NED)	80.596

1500 m men

In the final pair, Kramer bettered his personal best by nearly two seconds, thus advancing to third place on the Adelskalender. The outdoor world best mark was lowered by nearly three seconds by Fabris, who pipped Kramer to the line in the final pair, but remains 0.72 seconds behind before the final distance tomorrow, where Kramer was world record holder.

Pos.	Race	Time	Pos.	Allround rankings	Points
1.	Enrico Fabris (ITA)	1:44.72	1.	Sven Kramer (NED)	109.278
2.	Sven Kramer (NED)	1:44.86	2.	Enrico Fabris (ITA)	109.314
3.	Mark Tuitert (NED)	1:46.19	3.	Håvard Bøkko (NOR)	111.131
4.	Ivan Skobrev (RUS)	1:46.68	4.	Carl Verheijen (NED)	111.277
5.	Konrad Niedźwiedzki (POL)	1:46.96	5.	Mark Tuitert (NED)	111.675
6.	Tobias Schneider (GER)	1:47.03	6.	Ivan Skobrev (RUS)	111.878
7.	Håvard Bøkko (NOR)	1:47.10	7.	Eskil Ervik (NOR)	112.298
8.	Stefan Heythausen (GER)	1:47.28	8.	Wouter olde Heuvel (NED)	112.332
9.	Carl Verheijen (NED)	1:47.34	9.	Tobias Schneider (GER)	112.728
10.	Eskil Ervik (NOR)	1:47.56	11.	Henrik Christiansen (NOR)	113.198
11.	Wouter olde Heuvel (NED)	1:47.60	12.	Matteo Anesi (ITA)	113.365
12.	Henrik Christiansen (NOR)	1:47.87	13.	Sverre Haugli (NOR)	113.408

3000 m women

By winning the distance, 19-year-old Sáblíková advanced seven places in the overall standings, but still needed to beat Wüst by 14.05 seconds on the final 5,000 metres. On this distance, two-thirds the length, she beat Wüst by 4.09 seconds. Renate Groenewold finished second, also advancing seven places in the allround standings, after skating in the same pair as Sáblíková and leading until two laps remained.

Pos.	Race	Time	Pos.	Allround rankings	Points
1.	Martina Sáblíková (CZE)	4:03.52	1.	Ireen Wüst (NED)	119.704
2.	Renate Groenewold (NED)	4:04.24	2.	Martina Sáblíková (CZE)	121.109
3.	Ireen Wüst (NED)	4:07.61	3.	Renate Groenewold (NED)	121.302
4.	Daniela Anschütz-Thoms (GER)	4:08.28	4.	Daniela Anschütz-Thoms (GER)	121.370
5.	Marja Vis (NED)	4:09.99	5.	Claudia Pechstein (GER)	121.711
6.	Claudia Pechstein (GER)	4:11.15	6.	Paulien van Deutekom (NED)	122.087
7.	Maren Haugli (NOR)	4:11.85	7.	Marja Vis (NED)	122.168
8.	Lucille Opitz (GER)	4:12.13	8.	Yekaterina Abramova (RUS)	122.367
9.	Andrea Jirků (CZE)	4:12.51	9.	Lucille Opitz (GER)	123.104
10.	Paulien van Deutekom (NED)	4:12.79	10.	Katarzyna Wójcicka (POL)	123.211
11.	Katrin Mattscherodt (GER)	4:15.13	12.	Maren Haugli (NOR)	123.611
12.	Katarzyna Wójcicka (POL)	4:16.33	16.	Andrea Jirků (CZE)	126.591

== Sunday's events ==
The competitions began at 12:00 local time.

5000 m women

Sáblíková skated in the fifth pair, and after distancing Groenewold by 10 seconds and bettering the world outdoor mark by seven seconds, she set Wüst the task of finishing in 7:12.49 to become European champion. This would be fifth place thus far. Wüst started well, and with five laps to go, she was 0.6 seconds behind Sáblíková, with a cushion of more than 2.5 seconds per lap. But with lap times steadily going upwards, the worst being 37.0 on the penultimate lap, she arrived 0.23 seconds too late to become European champion. Sáblíková thus became the first Czech to win a senior speed skating championship. Neither Pechstein nor Anschütz-Thoms managed to beat Groenewold on the distance, giving Groenewold the bronze medal. Thus, in Friesinger's absence, Germany failed to finish on the podium for the first time since 1974.

Pos.	Race	Time	Pos.	Allround rankings	Points
1.	Martina Sáblíková (CZE)	6:58.75	1.	Martina Sáblíková (CZE)	162.954
2.	Renate Groenewold (NED)	7:08.76	2.	Ireen Wüst (NED)	162.977
3.	Claudia Pechstein (GER)	7:10.05	3.	Renate Groenewold (NED)	164.178
4.	Daniela Anschütz-Thoms (GER)	7:10.49	4.	Daniela Anschütz-Thoms (GER)	164.419
5.	Marja Vis (NED)	7:11.77	5.	Claudia Pechstein (GER)	164.716
6.	Ireen Wüst (NED)	7:12.73	6.	Marja Vis (NED)	165.345
7.	Maren Haugli (NOR)	7:14.26	7.	Paulien van Deutekom (NED)	166.481
8.	Andrea Jirků (CZE)	7:17.44	8.	Lucille Opitz (GER)	166.885
9.	Lucille Opitz (GER)	7:17.81	9.	Maren Haugli (NOR)	167.034
10.	Paulien van Deutekom (NED)	7:23.94	10.	Yekaterina Abramova (RUS)	167.829
11.	Katarzyna Wójcicka (POL)	7:31.08	11.	Katarzyna Wójcicka (POL)	168.319
12.	Yekaterina Abramova (RUS)	7:34.62	12.	Andrea Jirků (CZE)	170.412

10,000 m men

The outdoor world best mark was lowered twice during the race; first by Enrico Fabris in the fifth pair, who bettered the old record by four seconds on his way to leading the distance. Sven Kramer was thus required to skate 13:22.21 to win the championship; he kept well ahead of that, even skating the last two laps in times below 30 seconds, much faster than any other lap of the race. Verheijen also managed to beat Bøkko by 0.455 points (9.10 10,000 m-seconds) to take the bronze medal.

Pos.	Race	Time	Pos.	Allround rankings	Points
1.	Sven Kramer (NED)	13:10.44	1.	Sven Kramer (NED)	148.800
2.	Carl Verheijen (NED)	13:15.37	2.	Enrico Fabris (ITA)	149.389
3.	Enrico Fabris (ITA)	13:21.51	3.	Carl Verheijen (NED)	151.045
4.	Håvard Bøkko (NOR)	13:27.38	4.	Håvard Bøkko (NOR)	151.500
5.	Tobias Schneider (GER)	13:34.14	5.	Ivan Skobrev (RUS)	153.128
6.	Henrik Christiansen (NOR)	13:35.72	6.	Eskil Ervik (NOR)	153.129
7.	Sverre Haugli (NOR)	13:35.92	7.	Tobias Schneider (GER)	153.435
8.	Eskil Ervik (NOR)	13:36.62	8.	Mark Tuitert (NED)	153.928
9.	Ivan Skobrev (RUS)	13:45.01	9.	Henrik Christiansen (NOR)	153.984
10.	Wouter olde Heuvel (NED)	13:54.40	10.	Wouter olde Heuvel (NED)	154.052
11.	Mark Tuitert (NED)	14:05.27	11.	Sverre Haugli (NOR)	154.204
12.	Matteo Anesi (ITA)	14:22.38	12.	Matteo Anesi (ITA)	156.484

== See also ==
- 2007 World Allround Speed Skating Championships
