= 2008–09 ISU Speed Skating World Cup – Men's 5000 and 10000 metres =

The 5000 and 10000 metres distances for men in the 2008–09 ISU Speed Skating World Cup were contested over six races on six occasions, out of a total of nine World Cup occasions for the season, with the first occasion taking place in Berlin, Germany, on 7–9 November 2008, and the final occasion taking place in Salt Lake City, United States, on 6–7 March 2009.

Sven Kramer of the Netherlands won the cup, while the defending champion, Håvard Bøkko of Norway, came second, and Bob de Jong of the Netherlands came third.

== Top three ==
Medal	Athlete	Points	Previous season
Gold	(Netherlands) Sven Kramer	550	2nd
Silver	(Norway) Håvard Bøkko	485	1st
Bronze	(Netherlands) Bob de Jong	425	4th

== Race medallists ==
Occasion #	Location	Date	Distance	Gold	Time	Silver	Time	Bronze	Time	Report
1	Berlin, Germany	7 November	5000 metres	Sven Kramer; Netherlands	6:15.74	Håvard Bøkko; Norway	6:20.03	Carl Verheijen; Netherlands	6:20.87	
2	Heerenveen, Netherlands	15 November	5000 metres	Sven Kramer; Netherlands	6:14.32	Carl Verheijen; Netherlands	6:20.18	Enrico Fabris; Italy	6:20.20	
3	Moscow, Russia	23 November	10000 metres	Bob de Jong; Netherlands	12:59.21	Håvard Bøkko; Norway	13:00.65	Enrico Fabris; Italy	13:11.98	
7	Erfurt, Germany	30 January	5000 metres	Sven Kramer; Netherlands	6:16.02	Håvard Bøkko; Norway	6:22.37	Bob de Jong; Netherlands	6:23.45	
8	Heerenveen, Netherlands	15 February	10000 metres	Sven Kramer; Netherlands	13:03.51	Håvard Bøkko; Norway	13:07.93	Bob de Jong; Netherlands	13:09.16	
9	Salt Lake City, United States	7 March	5000 metres	Sven Kramer; Netherlands	6:06.64	Håvard Bøkko; Norway	6:09.94	Carl Verheijen; Netherlands	6:13.17	

== Final standings ==
Standings as of 8 March 2009 (end of the season).

#	Name	Nat.	BER	HVN1	MOS	ERF	HVN2	SLC	Total
1	Sven Kramer	(Netherlands)	100	100	–	100	100	150	550
2	Håvard Bøkko	(Norway)	80	45	80	80	80	120	485
3	Bob de Jong	(Netherlands)	60	50	100	70	70	75	425
4	Carl Verheijen	(Netherlands)	70	80	35	50	50	105	390
5	Enrico Fabris	(Italy)	50	70	70	28	60	90	368
6	Ted-Jan Bloemen	(Netherlands)	36	40	60	–	45	36	217
7	Øystein Grødum	(Norway)	32	24	50	36	35	14	191
8	Trevor Marsicano	(United States)	15	32	15	45	30	40	177
9	Wouter olde Heuvel	(Netherlands)	40	36	–	60	–	32	168
10	Sverre Haugli	(Norway)	–	19	35	32	30	24	140
11	Marco Weber	(Germany)	18	18	30	21	25	28	140
12	Lucas Makowsky	(Canada)	16	16	21	40	40	5	138
13	Roger Schneider	(Switzerland)	12	28	45	14	25	8	132
14	Chad Hedrick	(United States)	45	60	–	24	–	–	129
15	Sławomir Chmura	(Poland)	25	21	25	18	20	12	121
16	Hiroki Hirako	(Japan)	24	14	40	5	8	16	107
17	Ivan Skobrev	(Russia)	0	25	20	16	–	45	106
18	Tobias Schneider	(Germany)	21	12	5	12	18	10	78
19	Moritz Geisreiter	(Germany)	14	10	25	6	–	18	73
20	Robert Lehmann	(Germany)	1	6	0	25	15	21	68
21	Mark Ooijevaar	(Netherlands)	–	–	30	–	35	–	65
22	Tore Solli	(Norway)	10	6	18	8	–	–	42
23	Johan Röjler	(Sweden)	0	11	9	4	11	6	41
24	Ryan Bedford	(United States)	0	15	15	10	–	–	40
25	Kwun-Won Choi	(South Korea)	19	8	3	–	–	–	30
26	Dmitry Babenko	(Kazakhstan)	0	0	2	6	21	–	29
27	Jay Morrison	(Canada)	4	0	0	15	10	–	29
28	Shani Davis	(United States)	28	–	–	–	–	–	28
29	Kris Schildermans	(Belgium)	11	5	–	11	0	–	27
30	Shigeyuki Dejima	(Japan)	0	8	13	0	5	–	26
31	Luca Stefani	(Italy)	–	0	7	1	15	–	23
32	Ben Jongejan	(Netherlands)	–	–	–	19	–	–	19
33	Steven Elm	(Canada)	–	4	4	8	2	–	18
34	Song Xingyu	(China)	6	2	6	–	–	–	14
35	Shane Dobbin	(New Zealand)	–	–	–	–	13	–	13
36	Artyom Belousov	(Russia)	–	–	11	–	–	–	11
37	Brigt Rykkje	(Netherlands)	–	–	10	–	–	–	10
38	Henrik Christiansen	(Norway)	–	–	–	–	9	–	9
39	Matteo Anesi	(Italy)	8	–	–	–	–	–	8
39	Fredrik van der Horst	(Norway)	8	–	–	–	–	–	8
39	Aleksandr Rumyantsev	(Russia)	–	–	8	0	–	–	8
42	Jordan Belchos	(Canada)	0	1	0	–	7	–	8
43	Mathieu Giroux	(Canada)	–	–	–	0	6	–	6
44	Denny Morrison	(Canada)	6	–	–	–	–	–	6
45	Andrey Burlyayev	(Russia)	5	0	0	0	–	–	5
46	Alexej Baumgartner	(Germany)	–	–	–	0	4	–	4
47	Justin Warsylewicz	(Canada)	4	0	–	–	–	–	4
48	Paul Dyrud	(United States)	–	–	–	0	3	–	3
49	Stian Elvenes	(Norway)	–	–	–	2	1	–	3
50	Patrick Beckert	(Germany)	2	–	–	–	–	–	2
51	Andrew Godbout	(Canada)	–	–	1	–	–	–	1
