= 2009–10 ISU Speed Skating World Cup – Men's 5000 and 10000 metres =

The 5000 and 10000 metres distances for men in the 2009–10 ISU Speed Skating World Cup were contested over six races on six occasions, out of a total of seven World Cup occasions for the season, with the first occasion taking place in Berlin, Germany, on 6–8 November 2009, and the final occasion taking place in Heerenveen, Netherlands, on 12–14 March 2010.

The previous season's runner-up, Håvard Bøkko of Norway, won the cup, while Ivan Skobrev of Russia came second, and Bob de Jong of the Netherlands repeated his third place from the previous season. The defending champion, Sven Kramer of the Netherlands, finished only fourth, despite winning the first four races.

== Top three ==
Medal	Athlete	Points	Previous season
Gold	(Norway) Håvard Bøkko	455	2nd
Silver	(Russia) Ivan Skobrev	430	17th
Bronze	(Netherlands) Bob de Jong	416	3rd

== Race medallists ==
Occasion #	Location	Date	Distance	Gold	Time	Silver	Time	Bronze	Time	Report
1	Berlin, Germany	7 November	5000 metres	Sven Kramer; Netherlands	6:14.69	Håvard Bøkko; Norway	6:17.17	Bob de Jong; Netherlands	6:19.22	
2	Heerenveen, Netherlands	14 November	5000 metres	Sven Kramer; Netherlands	6:16.29	Bob de Jong; Netherlands	6:16.38	Håvard Bøkko; Norway	6:17.10	
3	Hamar, Norway	22 November	10000 metres	Sven Kramer; Netherlands	12:50.96	Bob de Jong; Netherlands	12:54.97	Ivan Skobrev; Russia	13:01.41	
4	Calgary, Canada	5 December	5000 metres	Sven Kramer; Netherlands	6:11.11	Ivan Skobrev; Russia	6:13.19	Bob de Jong; Netherlands	6:13.80	
5	Salt Lake City, United States	12 December	5000 metres	Enrico Fabris; Italy	6:06.06	Bob de Jong; Netherlands	6:08.76	Ivan Skobrev; Russia	6:10.58	
7	Heerenveen, Netherlands	13 March	5000 metres	Håvard Bøkko; Norway	6:20.52	Sverre Haugli; Norway	6:21.69	Ivan Skobrev; Russia	6:23.24	

== Final standings ==
Standings as of 14 March 2010 (end of the season).

#	Name	Nat.	BER	HVN1	HAM	CAL	SLC	HVN2	Total
1	Håvard Bøkko	(Norway)	80	70	60	45	50	150	455
2	Ivan Skobrev	(Russia)	45	60	70	80	70	105	430
3	Bob de Jong	(Netherlands)	70	80	80	70	80	36	416
4	Sven Kramer	(Netherlands)	100	100	100	100	–	–	400
5	Carl Verheijen	(Netherlands)	60	–	50	60	60	28	258
6	Enrico Fabris	(Italy)	32	28	45	18	100	32	255
7	Wouter olde Heuvel	(Netherlands)	50	50	40	36	–	75	251
8	Sverre Haugli	(Norway)	–	21	0	19	21	120	181
9	Henrik Christiansen	(Norway)	–	19	25	32	36	45	157
10	Jan Blokhuijsen	(Netherlands)	–	25	–	25	–	90	140
11	Chad Hedrick	(United States)	28	45	–	21	45	–	139
12	Lee Seung-hoon	(South Korea)	11	36	–	50	40	–	137
13	Shani Davis	(United States)	36	40	–	24	32	–	132
14	Alexis Contin	(France)	25	32	–	40	28	–	125
15	Shane Dobbin	(New Zealand)	19	18	0	28	24	24	113
16	Marco Weber	(Germany)	18	16	35	12	–	16	97
17	Johan Röjler	(Sweden)	16	14	30	16	18	–	94
18	Lucas Makowsky	(Canada)	24	10	25	10	5	18	92
19	Øystein Grødum	(Norway)	12	–	21	8	10	40	91
20	Hiroki Hirako	(Japan)	21	5	15	14	14	14	83
21	Koen Verweij	(Netherlands)	40	24	–	–	–	–	64
22	Mathieu Giroux	(Canada)	15	12	20	6	8	–	61
23	Patrick Beckert	(Germany)	14	8	0	11	16	12	61
24	Sławomir Chmura	(Poland)	4	15	5	0	12	21	57
25	Arjen van der Kieft	(Netherlands)	–	–	35	–	–	–	35
26	Reidar Borgersen	(Norway)	–	–	30	5	–	–	35
27	Dmitry Babenko	(Kazakhstan)	2	4	9	0	15	–	30
27	Luca Stefani	(Italy)	0	8	7	15	–	–	30
29	Robert Lehmann	(Germany)	10	6	11	0	–	–	27
30	Bob de Vries	(Netherlands)	–	–	–	–	25	–	25
31	Haralds Silovs	(Latvia)	–	–	–	6	19	–	25
32	Aleksandr Rumyantsev	(Russia)	0	0	18	0	6	–	24
33	Sebastian Druszkiewicz	(Poland)	0	11	13	0	–	–	24
34	Jonathan Kuck	(United States)	8	6	–	1	8	–	23
35	Shigeyuki Dejima	(Japan)	0	1	8	2	11	–	22
36	Brian Hansen	(United States)	2	2	10	4	1	–	19
37	Tobias Schneider	(Germany)	8	0	0	8	–	–	16
38	Ryan Bedford	(United States)	6	0	6	0	0	–	12
39	Fredrik van der Horst	(Norway)	6	0	–	–	2	–	8
40	Joshua Lose	(Australia)	0	0	0	0	6	–	6
41	Moritz Geisreiter	(Germany)	5	–	–	0	–	–	5
42	Matteo Anesi	(Italy)	4	0	–	0	–	–	4
42	Steven Elm	(Canada)	0	0	–	0	4	–	4
42	Jan Szymański	(Poland)	–	–	4	0	–	–	4
45	Choi Kwun-won	(South Korea)	3	0	–	0	0	–	3
45	Masashi Michishita	(Japan)	0	0	3	0	0	–	3
47	Keith Sulzer	(Canada)	–	–	2	–	–	–	2
48	Alexej Baumgartner	(Germany)	–	0	1	–	–	–	1
48	Jordan Belchos	(Canada)	1	0	0	0	0	–	1
48	Roger Schneider	(Switzerland)	1	0	0	0	0	–	1
