= 2010 World Allround Speed Skating Championships =

International speed skating competition

World Allround Speed Skating Championships
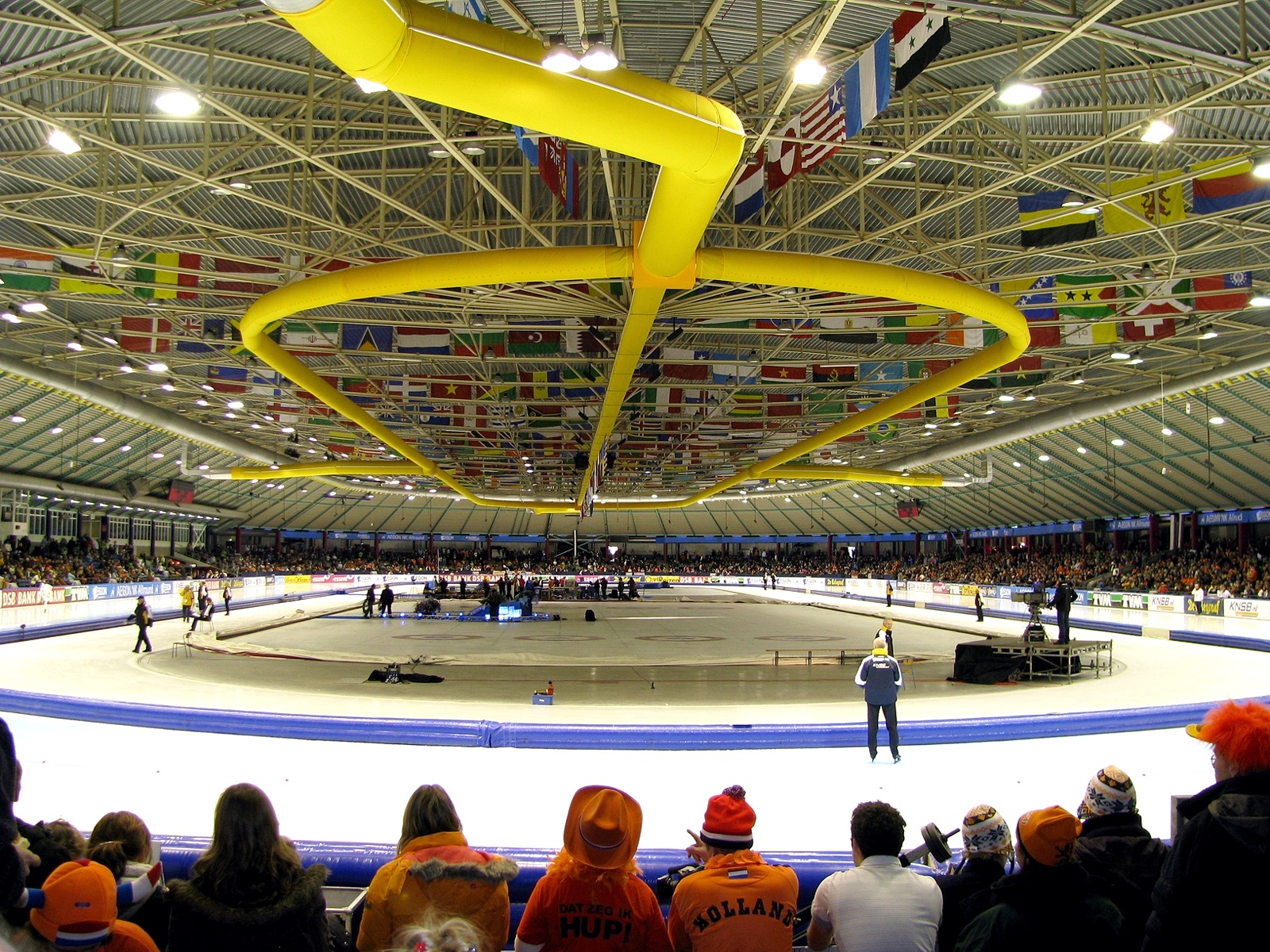
- Thialf (Heerenveen)
- Location: Heerenveen, Netherlands
- Venue: Thialf
- Dates: 19–21 March
- Competitors: 48

Medalist men
1st place, gold medalist(s)		Sven Kramer	NED
2nd place, silver medalist(s)		Jonathan Kuck	USA
3rd place, bronze medalist(s)		Håvard Bøkko	NOR

Medalist women
1st place, gold medalist(s)		Martina Sáblíková	CZE
2nd place, silver medalist(s)		Kristina Groves	CAN
3rd place, bronze medalist(s)		Ireen Wüst	NED

The 2010 World Allround Speed Skating Championships were held at the indoor ice rink of the Thialf in Heerenveen, Netherlands on 19, 20 and 21 March 2010.

Defending champions were Martina Sáblíková and Sven Kramer. Both succeeded to prolong the title. For Sáblíková it became her second world allround title. Kramer became world allround champion for the fourth time, he is the first person to do so four times in a row. Other world allround champions to win four titles are Ivar Ballangrud and Rintje Ritsma, and only Oscar Mathisen and Clas Thunberg won five times (see Number of World Allround Speed Skating Championships per person).

Jonathan Kuck who became second was the big surprise of the tournament. This 20-year-old former short track skater got 149.558 points which was his PB. Kuck won the 1500 metres and became first in the overall lead. Kuck could skate 5 seconds slower at the 10000 metres to become world allround champion. In the beginning of the 10000 metres he attacked the time Kramer had set in the race before, but in the second half of the race he could not maintain this time schedule.

== Men's championships ==
=== Day 1 ===
==== 500 metres ====
Place	Athlete	Country	Time
1st place, gold medalist(s)	Konrad Niedźwiedzki	Poland	35.68
2nd place, silver medalist(s)	Joel Eriksson	Sweden	36.25
3rd place, bronze medalist(s)	Jonathan Kuck	United States	36.31 PB
4	Matteo Anesi	Italy	36.36
5	Trevor Marsicano	United States	36.40
6	Sven Kramer	Netherlands	36.45
6	Lucas Makowsky	Canada	36.45
8	Zbigniew Bródka	Poland	36.61 PB
9	Jan Blokhuijsen	Netherlands	36.62
9	Håvard Bøkko	Norway	36.62
11	Mathieu Giroux	Canada	36.65
12	Ivan Skobrev	Russia	36.78
13	Ted-Jan Bloemen	Netherlands	36.87 PB
14	Jeff Kitura	Canada	36.90
15	Wouter olde Heuvel	Netherlands	36.95
16	Luca Stefani	Italy	37.28
17	Johan Röjler	Sweden	37.30
18	Justin Warsylewicz	Canada	37.50
19	Hiroki Hirako	Japan	37.88
20	Sverre Haugli	Norway	38.10
21	Patrick Beckert	Germany	38.13
22	Shane Dobbin	New Zealand	38.41
23	Marco Weber	Germany	38.54
24	Joshua Lose	Australia	39.22

==== 5000 metres ====
Place	Athlete	Country	Time
1st place, gold medalist(s)	Sven Kramer	Netherlands	6:19.63
2nd place, silver medalist(s)	Håvard Bøkko	Norway	6:21.08
3rd place, bronze medalist(s)	Ted-Jan Bloemen	Netherlands	6:23.41
4	Jonathan Kuck	United States	6:23.47
5	Ivan Skobrev	Russia	6:23.88
6	Sverre Haugli	Norway	6:26.03
7	Jan Blokhuijsen	Netherlands	6:27.68
8	Wouter olde Heuvel	Netherlands	6:29.45
9	Shane Dobbin	New Zealand	6:30.64
10	Trevor Marsicano	United States	6:32.79
11	Lucas Makowsky	Canada	6:35.06
12	Marco Weber	Germany	6:36.88
13	Hiroki Hirako	Japan	6:36.94
14	Patrick Beckert	Germany	6:37.05
15	Johan Röjler	Sweden	6:41.14
16	Mathieu Giroux	Canada	6:41.33
17	Joel Eriksson	Sweden	6:41.53
18	Luca Stefani	Italy	6:42.19
19	Matteo Anesi	Italy	6:42.52
20	Zbigniew Bródka	Poland	6:42.95
21	Justin Warsylewicz	Canada	6:44.42
22	Konrad Niedźwiedzki	Poland	6:48.95
23	Jeff Kitura	Canada	6:56.52
24	Joshua Lose	Australia	7:02.12

=== Day 2 ===
==== 1500 metres ====
Place	Athlete	Country	Time
1st place, gold medalist(s)	Jonathan Kuck	United States	1:45.36 PB
2nd place, silver medalist(s)	Lucas Makowsky	Canada	1:46.15
3rd place, bronze medalist(s)	Trevor Marsicano	United States	1:46.70
4	Sven Kramer	Netherlands	1:46.83
5	Konrad Niedźwiedzki	Poland	1:47.19
6	Håvard Bøkko	Norway	1:47.68
7	Ted-Jan Bloemen	Netherlands	1:47.85
8	Wouter olde Heuvel	Netherlands	1:47.89
9	Matteo Anesi	Italy	1:47.95
10	Jan Blokhuijsen	Netherlands	1:48.00
11	Mathieu Giroux	Canada	1:48.09
12	Sverre Haugli	Norway	1:48.22
13	Zbigniew Bródka	Poland	1:48.62
14	Joel Eriksson	Sweden	1:49.15
15	Jeff Kitura	Canada	1:49.66
16	Luca Stefani	Italy	1:49.78
17	Johan Röjler	Sweden	1:49.86
18	Justin Warsylewicz	Canada	1:50.37
19	Patrick Beckert	Germany	1:50.56 PB
20	Shane Dobbin	New Zealand	1:51.20
21	Marco Weber	Germany	1:52.63
22	Hiroki Hirako	Japan	1:54.09
23	Ivan Skobrev	Russia	1:58.87
	Joshua Lose	Australia	DNS

=== Day 3 ===
==== 10000 metres ====
Place	Athlete	Country	Time
1st place, gold medalist(s)	Sven Kramer	Netherlands	12:57.97
2nd place, silver medalist(s)	Håvard Bøkko	Norway	13:12.13
3rd place, bronze medalist(s)	Ted-Jan Bloemen	Netherlands	13:13.56
4	Jonathan Kuck	United States	13:15.62 PB
5	Sverre Haugli	Norway	13:18.39
6	Jan Blokhuijsen	Netherlands	13:25.97 PB
7	Shane Dobbin	New Zealand	13:30.30 PB
8	Wouter olde Heuvel	Netherlands	13:32.27
9	Trevor Marsicano	United States	13:38.11
10	Lucas Makowsky	Canada	13:54.63
11	Matteo Anesi	Italy	14:08.40
12	Konrad Niedźwiedzki	Poland	14:10.78

=== Results ===
Place	Athlete	Country	500 m	5000 m	1500 m	10000 m	Points
1st place, gold medalist(s)	Sven Kramer	Netherlands	36.45 (6)	6:19.63 (1)	1:46.83 (4)	12:57.97 (1)	148.921
2nd place, silver medalist(s)	Jonathan Kuck	United States	36.31 (3)	6:23.47 (4)	1:45.36 (1)	13:15.62 (4)	149.558
3rd place, bronze medalist(s)	Håvard Bøkko	Norway	36.62 (9)	6:21.08 (2)	1:47.68 (6)	13:12.13 (2)	150.227
4	Ted-Jan Bloemen	Netherlands	36.87 (13)	6:23.41 (3)	1:47.85 (7)	13:13.56 (3)	150.839
5	Jan Blokhuijsen	Netherlands	36.62 (9)	6:27.68 (7)	1:48.00 (10)	13:25.97 (6)	151.686
6	Trevor Marsicano	United States	36.40 (5)	6:32.79 (10)	1:46.70 (3)	13:38.11 (9)	152.150
7	Wouter olde Heuvel	Netherlands	36.95 (15)	6:29.45 (8)	1:47.89 (8)	13:32.27 (8)	152.471
8	Sverre Haugli	Norway	38.10 (20)	6:26.03 (6)	1:48.22 (12)	13:18.39 (5)	152.695
9	Lucas Makowsky	Canada	36.45 (6)	6:35.06 (11)	1:46.15 (2)	13:54.63 (10)	153.070
10	Konrad Niedźwiedzki	Poland	35.68 (1)	6:48.95 (22)	1:47.19 (5)	14:10.78 (12)	154.844
11	Matteo Anesi	Italy	36.36 (4)	6:42.52 (19)	1:47.95 (9)	14:08.40 (11)	155.015
12	Shane Dobbin	New Zealand	38.41 (22)	6:30.64 (9)	1:51.20 (20)	13:30.30 (7)	155.055
NQ13	Joel Eriksson	Sweden	36.25 (2)	6:41.53 (17)	1:49.15 (14)		112.786
NQ14	Mathieu Giroux	Canada	36.65 (11)	6:41.33 (16)	1:48.09 (11)		112.813
NQ15	Zbigniew Bródka	Poland	36.61 (8)	6:42.95 (20)	1:48.62 (13)		113.111
NQ16	Johan Röjler	Sweden	37.30 (17)	6:41.14 (15)	1:49.86 (17)		114.034
NQ17	Luca Stefani	Italy	37.28 (16)	6:42.19 (18)	1:49.78 (16)		114.092
NQ18	Patrick Beckert	Germany	38.13 (21)	6:37.05 (14)	1:50.56 (19)		114.688
NQ19	Justin Warsylewicz	Canada	37.50 (18)	6:44.42 (21)	1:50.37 (18)		114.732
NQ20	Ivan Skobrev	Russia	36.78 (12)	6:23.88 (5)	1:58.87 (23)	RET	114.791
NQ21	Jeff Kitura	Canada	36.90 (14)	6:56.52 (23)	1:49.66 (15)		115.105
NQ22	Hiroki Hirako	Japan	37.88 (19)	6:36.94 (13)	1:54.09 (22)		115.604
NQ23	Marco Weber	Germany	38.54 (23)	6:36.88 (12)	1:52.63 (21)		115.771
NQ24	Joshua Lose	Australia	39.22 (24)	7:02.12 (24)	DNS		81.432

NQ = Not qualified for the 10000 m (only the best 12 are qualified)
DNS = Did not start.
RET = Retreated before the lottery of the 10000 m and so Matteo Anesi became qualified.

== Women's championships ==
=== Day 2 ===
==== 500 metres ====
Place	Athlete	Country	Time
1st place, gold medalist(s)	Yekaterina Shikhova	Russia	38.83
2nd place, silver medalist(s)	Yekaterina Lobysheva	Russia	39.15
3rd place, bronze medalist(s)	Karolína Erbanová	Czech Republic	39.31
4	Kristina Groves	Canada	39.42
5	Hege Bøkko	Norway	39.46 PB
6	Ireen Wüst	Netherlands	39.54
7	Anna Ringsred	United States	39.91
8	Katarzyna Bachleda-Curuś	Poland	40.10
9	Brittany Schussler	Canada	40.17
10	Elma de Vries	Netherlands	40.17
11	Martina Sáblíková	Czech Republic	40.25
12	Jorien Voorhuis	Netherlands	40.29
13	Jilleanne Rookard	United States	40.31
14	Maki Tabata	Japan	40.37
15	Daniela Anschütz-Thoms	Germany	40.48
16	Diane Valkenburg	Netherlands	40.52
17	Cindy Klassen	Canada	40.63
18	Shiho Ishizawa	Japan	40.83
19	Maren Haugli	Norway	41.06
20	Mari Hemmer	Norway	41.08
21	Masako Hozumi	Japan	41.36
22	Nicole Garrido	Canada	41.65
23	Park Do-yeong	South Korea	41.72
24	Stephanie Beckert	Germany	42.71

==== 3000 metres ====
Place	Athlete	Country	Time
1st place, gold medalist(s)	Martina Sáblíková	Czech Republic	4:03.59
2nd place, silver medalist(s)	Ireen Wüst	Netherlands	4:05.10
3rd place, bronze medalist(s)	Stephanie Beckert	Germany	4:05.62
4	Kristina Groves	Canada	4:05.98
5	Daniela Anschütz-Thoms	Germany	4:06.82
6	Jilleanne Rookard	United States	4:07.39
7	Jorien Voorhuis	Netherlands	4:08.27
8	Maren Haugli	Norway	4:08.58
9	Diane Valkenburg	Netherlands	4:09.08
10	Cindy Klassen	Canada	4:11.42
11	Elma de Vries	Netherlands	4:11.72
12	Brittany Schussler	Canada	4:11.94
13	Mari Hemmer	Norway	4:12.22
14	Masako Hozumi	Japan	4:14.27
15	Yekaterina Shikhova	Russia	4:14.48
16	Hege Bøkko	Norway	4:14.90 PB
17	Park Do-yeong	South Korea	4:14.96
18	Maki Tabata	Japan	4:15.20
19	Shiho Ishizawa	Japan	4:15.31
20	Nicole Garrido	Canada	4:15.51
21	Yekaterina Lobysheva	Russia	4:16.37
22	Anna Ringsred	United States	4:19.45
23	Katarzyna Bachleda-Curuś	Poland	4:19.60
24	Karolína Erbanová	Czech Republic	4:23.16

=== Day 3 ===
==== 1500 metres ====
Place	Athlete	Country	Time
1st place, gold medalist(s)	Kristina Groves	Canada	1:56.64
2nd place, silver medalist(s)	Ireen Wüst	Netherlands	1:56.86
3rd place, bronze medalist(s)	Martina Sáblíková	Czech Republic	1:57.23
4	Daniela Anschütz-Thoms	Germany	1:58.04
5	Diane Valkenburg	Netherlands	1:58.10
6	Brittany Schussler	Canada	1:58.28
7	Yekaterina Shikhova	Russia	1:58.57
8	Jorien Voorhuis	Netherlands	1:58.97
9	Hege Bøkko	Norway	1:59.01
10	Jilleanne Rookard	United States	1:59.13
11	Anna Ringsred	United States	1:59.18
12	Karolína Erbanová	Czech Republic	1:59.49
13	Yekaterina Lobysheva	Russia	1:59.72
14	Maki Tabata	Japan	1:59.84
15	Katarzyna Bachleda-Curuś	Poland	2:00.11
16	Cindy Klassen	Canada	2:00.26
17	Maren Haugli	Norway	2:01.37
18	Mari Hemmer	Norway	2:01.89
19	Stephanie Beckert	Germany	2:02.21
20	Masako Hozumi	Japan	2:02.33
21	Elma de Vries	Netherlands	2:03.04
22	Shiho Ishizawa	Japan	2:03.09
23	Park Do-yeong	South Korea	2:04.23
24	Nicole Garrido	Canada	2:04.40

==== 5000 metres ====
Place	Athlete	Country	Time
1st place, gold medalist(s)	Martina Sáblíková	Czech Republic	6:50.98
2nd place, silver medalist(s)	Stephanie Beckert	Germany	6:55.30
3rd place, bronze medalist(s)	Daniela Anschütz-Thoms	Germany	6:59.93
4	Kristina Groves	Canada	7:02.16
5	Maren Haugli	Norway	7:03.13
6	Jilleanne Rookard	United States	7:06.94
7	Ireen Wüst	Netherlands	7:07.63
8	Jorien Voorhuis	Netherlands	7:09.80
9	Cindy Klassen	Canada	7:11.03
10	Diane Valkenburg	Netherlands	7:11.96
11	Brittany Schussler	Canada	7:13.68
12	Yekaterina Shikhova	Russia	7:20.69

=== Results ===
Place	Athlete	Country	500 m	3000 m	1500 m	5000 m	Points
1st place, gold medalist(s)	Martina Sáblíková	Czech Republic	40.25 (11)	4:03.59 (1)	1:57.23 (3)	6:50.98 (1)	161.022
2nd place, silver medalist(s)	Kristina Groves	Canada	39.42 (4)	4:05.98 (4)	1:56.64 (1)	7:02.16 (4)	161.512
3rd place, bronze medalist(s)	Ireen Wüst	Netherlands	39.54 (6)	4:05.10 (2)	1:56.86 (2)	7:07.63 (7)	162.106
4	Daniela Anschütz-Thoms	Germany	40.48 (15)	4:06.82 (5)	1:58.04 (4)	6:59.93 (3)	162.955
5	Jilleanne Rookard	United States	40.31 (13)	4:07.39 (6)	1:59.13 (10)	7:06.94 (6)	163.945
6	Jorien Voorhuis	Netherlands	40.29 (12)	4:08.27 (7)	1:58.97 (8)	7:09.80 (8)	164.304
7	Diane Valkenburg	Netherlands	40.52 (16)	4:09.08 (9)	1:58.10 (5)	7:11.96 (10)	164.595
8	Yekaterina Shikhova	Russia	38.83 (1)	4:14.48 (15)	1:58.57 (7)	7:20.69 (12)	164.835
9	Brittany Schussler	Canada	40.17 (9)	4:11.94 (12)	1:58.28 (6)	7:13.68 (11)	164.954
10	Maren Haugli	Norway	41.06 (19)	4:08.58 (8)	2:01.37 (17)	7:03.13 (5)	165.259
11	Cindy Klassen	Canada	40.63 (17)	4:11.42 (10)	2:00.26 (16)	7:11.03 (9)	165.722
12	Stephanie Beckert	Germany	42.71 (24)	4:05.62 (3)	2:02.21 (19)	6:55.30 (2)	165.912
NQ13	Hege Bøkko	Norway	39.46 (5)	4:14.90 (16)	1:59.01 (9)		121.613
NQ14	Yekaterina Lobysheva	Russia	39.15 (2)	4:16.37 (21)	1:59.72 (13)		121.784
NQ15	Maki Tabata	Japan	40.37 (14)	4:15.20 (18)	1:59.84 (14)		122.849
NQ16	Anna Ringsred	United States	39.91 (7)	4:19.45 (22)	1:59.18 (11)		122.877
NQ17	Karolína Erbanová	Czech Republic	39.31 (3)	4:23.16 (24)	1:59.49 (12)		123.000
NQ18	Elma de Vries	Netherlands	40.17 (9)	4:11.72 (11)	2:03.04 (21)		123.136
NQ19	Katarzyna Bachleda-Curuś	Poland	40.10 (8)	4:19.60 (23)	2:00.11 (15)		123.402
NQ20	Mari Hemmer	Norway	41.08 (20)	4:12.22 (13)	2:01.89 (18)		123.746
NQ21	Shiho Ishizawa	Japan	40.83 (18)	4:15.31 (19)	2:03.09 (22)		124.411
NQ22	Masako Hozumi	Japan	41.36 (21)	4:14.27 (14)	2:02.33 (20)		124.514
NQ23	Park Do-yeong	South Korea	41.72 (23)	4:14.96 (17)	2:04.23 (23)		125.623
NQ24	Nicole Garrido	Canada	41.65 (22)	4:15.51 (20)	2:04.40 (24)		125.701

NQ = Not qualified for the 5000 m (only the best 12 are qualified)

== Rules ==
All 24 participating skaters are allowed to skate the first three distances; 12 skaters may take part on the fourth distance. These 12 skaters are determined by taking the standings on the longest of the first three distances, as well as the samalog standings after three distances, and comparing these lists as follows:

1. Skaters among the top 12 on both lists are qualified.
2. To make up a total of 12, skaters are then added in order of their best rank on either list. Samalog standings take precedence over the longest-distance standings in the event of a tie.

== See also ==
- Speed skating at the 2010 Winter Olympics
