= 2008–09 ISU Speed Skating World Cup – World Cup 7 =

The seventh competition weekend of the 2008–09 ISU Speed Skating World Cup was held in the Gunda Niemann-Stirnemann Halle in Erfurt, Germany, from Friday, 30 January, until Sunday, 1 February 2009.

== Schedule of events ==
The schedule of the event is below

Date	Time	Events
30 January	14:30 CET	500 m women 500 m men 1500 m women 5000 m men
31 January	14:00 CET	500 m women 500 m men 3000 m women 1500 m men
1 February	14:00 CET	1000 m women 1000 m men Team pursuit women Team pursuit men

== Medal winners ==
=== Men's events ===
Event	Race #	Gold	Time	Silver	Time	Bronze	Time	Report
500 m	1	Yu Fengtong; China	35.03	Keiichiro Nagashima; Japan	35.04	Tucker Fredricks; United States	35.12	
500 m	2	Tucker Fredricks; United States	34.91	Yu Fengtong; China	35.00	Jan Smeekens; Netherlands	35.26	
1000 m		Shani Davis; United States	1:08.40	Denny Morrison; Canada	1:08.78	Jan Bos; Netherlands	1:09.03	
1500 m		Denny Morrison; Canada	1:45.32	Trevor Marsicano; United States	1:46.00	Shani Davis; United States	1:46.25	
5000 m		Sven Kramer; Netherlands	6:16.02	Håvard Bøkko; Norway	6:22.37	Bob de Jong; Netherlands	6:23.45	
Team pursuit		Canada; Denny Morrison; Lucas Makowsky; Jay Morrison	3:46.03	Italy; Matteo Anesi; Enrico Fabris; Luca Stefani	3:46.56	Norway; Håvard Bøkko; Sverre Haugli; Stian Elvenes	3:48.39	

=== Women's events ===
Event	Race #	Gold	Time	Silver	Time	Bronze	Time	Report
500 m	1	Jenny Wolf; Germany	37.58	Yu Jing; China	38.18	Jin Peiyu; China	38.30	
500 m	2	Jenny Wolf; Germany	37.85	Yu Jing; China	38.00	Annette Gerritsen; Netherlands	38.28	
1000 m		Anni Friesinger; Germany	1:15.61	Yu Jing; China	1:16.41	Jin Peiyu; China	1:16.42	
1500 m		Anni Friesinger; Germany	1:56.90	Daniela Anschütz-Thoms; Germany	1:58.13	Ireen Wüst; Netherlands	1:58.54	
3000 m		Martina Sáblíková; Czech Republic	4:03.65	Daniela Anschütz-Thoms; Germany	4:05.14	Renate Groenewold; Netherlands	4:06.60	
Team pursuit		Czech Republic; Karolína Erbanová; Andrea Jirků; Martina Sáblíková	3:05.32	Russia; Galina Likhachova; Alla Shabanova; Yekaterina Shikhova	3:05.80	Poland; Natalia Czerwonka; Katarzyna Wójcicka; Luiza Złotkowska	3:06.26	
