= Michishita =

Michishita (written: 道下) is a Japanese surname Notable people with the surname include:

- Daiki Michishita (道下 大樹, born 1975), Japanese politician
- Masashi Michishita, a contender in the 2009–10 ISU Speed Skating World Cup – Men's 5000 and 10000 metres
- Misato Michishita (道下 美里, born 1977), Japanese Paralympic athlete
- Momo Michishita, composer for the pet simulation role-playing game Zoobles! Spring to Life!
- Shinsuke Michishita, bandleader for the Japanese psychedelic rock group LSD March

== Fictional characters ==
- Michishita, a character in the manga series Seitokai Yakuindomo
- Masaki Michishita, a character in the manga Kuso Miso Technique
