= Christian Pichler =

Austrian long track speed skater (born 1988)

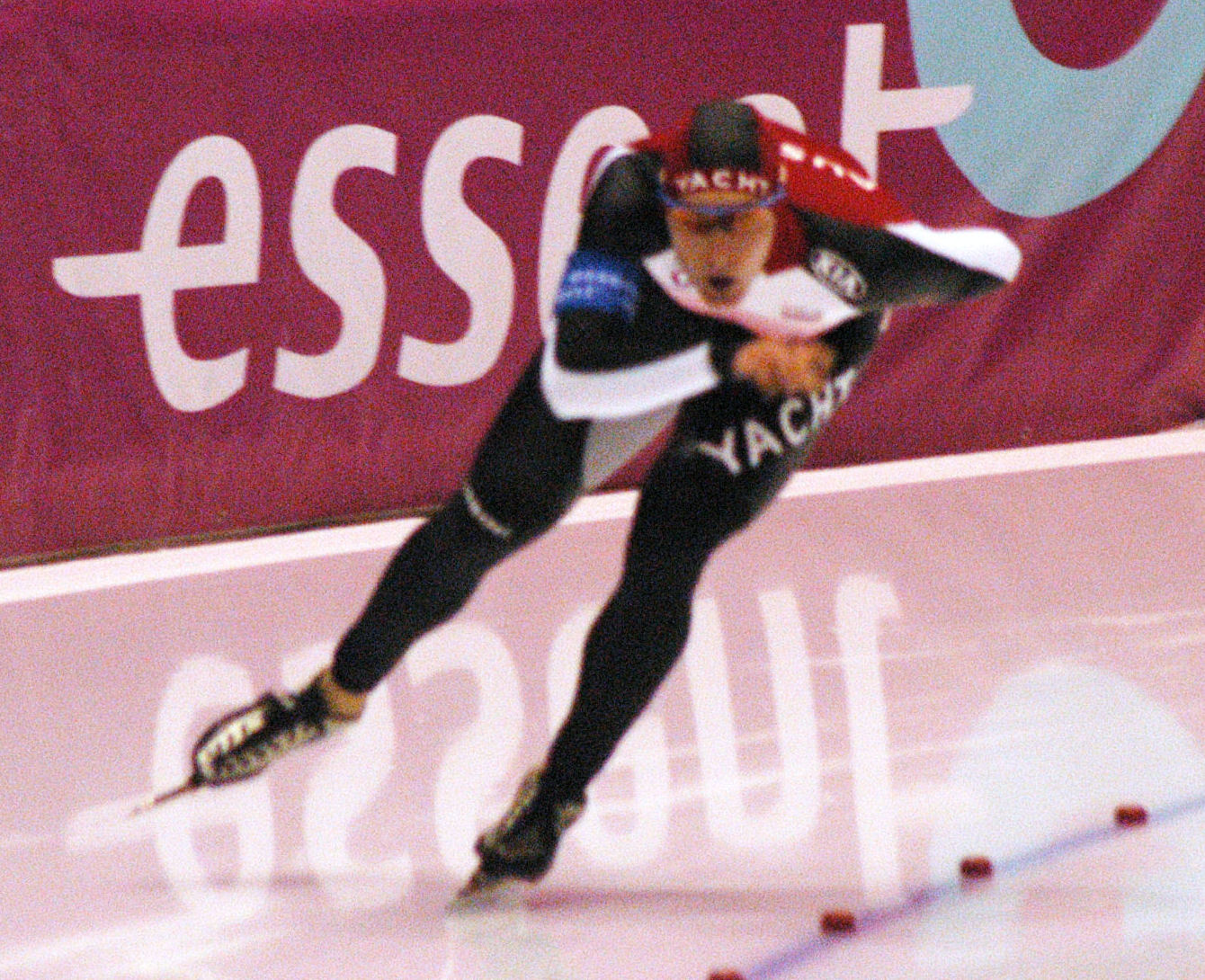
Christian Pichler speedskating in 2007

Christian Pichler (born July 12, 1988) is an Austrian long track speed skater who participates in international competitions.

== Personal records ==
Personal records
Men's Speed skating
Event	Result	Date	Location	Notes
500 m	37.45	2008-01-12	Kolomna	
1,000 m	1:12.34	2007-11-11	Salt Lake City	
1,500 m	1:48.57	2007-11-09	Salt Lake City	
3,000 m	3:53.42	2007-11-03	Calgary	
5,000 m	6:36.46	2007-11-17	Calgary	
10,000 m	14:09.68	2006-11-26	Moscow	

=== Career highlights ===
European Allround Championships
2006 - Hamar, 29th
2007 - Collalbo, 23rd
2008 - Kolomna, 17th
World Junior Allround Championships
2005 - Seinäjoki, 29th
2006 - Erfurt, 13th
National Championships
2006 - Davos, (gold) 1st at allround
2007 - Innsbruck, (gold) 1st at allround
European Junior Games
2006 - Collalbo, (silver) 2nd at 3000 m
