= Jarmo Valtonen =

Finnish speed skater

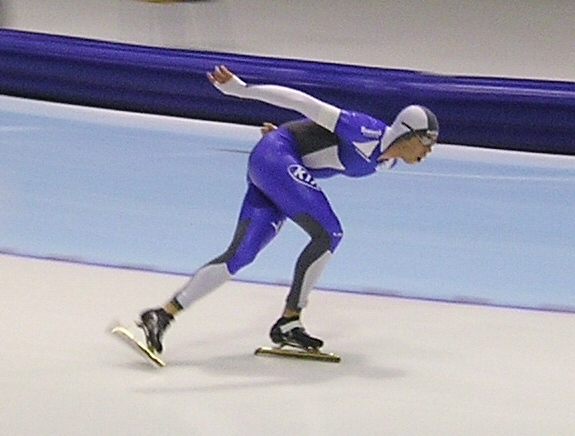
Jarmo Valtonen in 2007.

Jarmo Valtonen (born 29 November 1982 in Espoo) is a Finnish long track speed skater who participates in international competitions.

== Personal records ==
Personal records
Men's Speed skating
Event	Result	Date	Location	Notes
500 m	36.67	2007-02-09	Heerenveen	
1,000 m	1:10.85	2007-02-24	Calgary	
1,500 m	1:47.15	2007-03-11	Salt Lake City	
3,000 m	3:56.69	2003-11-23	Heerenveen	
5,000 m	6:33.84	2005-11-19	Salt Lake City	
10,000 m	13:56.42	2005-12-04	Heerenveen	

=== Career highlights ===
European Allround Championships
2004 - Heerenveen, 27th
2005 - Heerenveen, 24th
2006 - Hamar, 23rd
2007 - Collalbo, 15th
2008 - Kolomna, 33rd
World Junior Allround Championships
1999 - Geithus, 29th
2000 - Seinäjoki, 22nd
2001 - Groningen, 19th
National Championships
2001 - Helsinki, (bronze) 3rd at 10000 m
2001 - Helsinki, (bronze) 3rd at allround
2001 - Harjavalta, (gold) 1st at 500 m
2001 - Harjavalta, (silver) 2nd at 1500 m
2001 - Harjavalta, (bronze) 3rd at 5000 m
2002 - Seinäjoki, (silver) 2nd at 10000 m
2002 - Helsinki, (bronze) 3rd at sprint
2003 - Seinäjoki, (silver) 2nd at 10000 m
2003 - Seinäjoki, (gold) 1st at allround
2004 - Helsinki, (gold) 1st at 5000 m
2004 - Seinäjoki, (silver) 2nd at 10000 m
2004 - Seinäjoki, (gold) 1st at allround
2004 - Helsinki, (silver) 2nd at 500 m
2005 - Helsinki, (bronze) 3rd at 1000 m
2005 - Helsinki, (gold) 1st at 5000 m
2007 - Helsinki, (gold) 1st at allround
Nordic Junior Games
1999 - Helsinki, (bronze) 3rd at 500 m
2000 - Chemnitz, (silver) 2nd at 500 m
2001 - Gothenburg, (silver) 2nd at 1000 m
