= Andrea Jirků =

Czech long track speed skater (born 1989)

Andrea Jirků (born 14 November 1989) is a Czech former long track speed skater who participated in international competitions.

== Personal records ==
Personal records
Women's speed skating
Event	Result	Date	Location	Notes
500 m	42.40	2007-02-09	Heerenveen	
1000 m	1:21.93	2005-11-19	Salt Lake City	
1500 m	2:01.29	2007-11-17	Calgary	
3000 m	4:09.09	2007-11-16	Calgary	
5000 m	7:07.97	2007-03-11	Salt Lake City	

=== Career highlights ===
European Allround Championships
2007 – Collalbo, 12th
2008 – Kolomna, 22nd
World Junior Allround Championships
2006 – Erfurt, 23rd
