= Milan Sáblík =

Czech speedskater

Milan Sáblík (Czech pronunciation: [ˈmɪlan ˈsaːbliːk]; 14 March 1991 in Nové Město na Moravě) is a Czech former speedskater and the younger brother of Martina Sáblíková, the 2007 European Champion and double World Single Distances Champion. Martina Sáblíková and Milan Sáblík are a rare example of sister and brother both holding world records in the same sport at the same time; Martina holds the (senior) world records in the 5,000-m and 10,000-m events (both from March 2007), as well as in the 3,000m (March 2019), while Milan held the junior world record for the team pursuit with fellow Czech junior skaters Pavel Kulma and Zdeněk Haselberger between 2007 and 2010.

During the 2007 European Speed Skating Championships in Collalbo Sáblík impressed by skating the 5,000-m in less than seven minutes (6:59.98) at the age of fifteen. His four-year older sister Martina beat him by 1.53 seconds, however, when she won the women's 5,000-m.

At the end of the 2006–2007 season, Sáblík's personal bests were 38.53 (500-m), 1:56.54 (1,500-m), 6:59.98 (5,000-m) and 14:15.65 (10,000-m). This already made him, at the age of fifteen, the second best male Czech speedskater ever, on the all-time best Adelskalender list, after Miroslav Vtípil. (Pim Berkhout also had a better Adelskalender point-sum than Vtípil and Sáblík, but his 10,000 m time dates from the part of his career when he represented the Netherlands rather than the Czech Republic.)

The 2007–2008 season has started very well for Sáblík, who already before November 2007 managed to climb from rank 423 to rank 277 on the Adelskalender list, passing also Vtípil. TFurther improvements during the Salt Lake City, Calgary and Kolomna World Cup meets of November and December 2007 made him climb further, to rank 189. With his new Czech national records on the 5000-m he also surpassed his world champion and world record holder sister on that distance.

At the Calgary World Cup 18 November 2007, the Czech Republic entered a team with only juniors for the Team Pursuit event. They placed 13th in this competition, but their achieved result 3:55.26 secured Milan Sáblík, Pavel Kulma and Zdeněk Haselberger a Junior world record (the previous record 3:56.27 was set by the Dutch team Ted Jan Bloemen, Wouter Oude Heuvel, Boris Kusmirak in Erfurt 12 March 2006).

In 2013, Sablík ended his career in the sport.
