= Tobias Schneider =

German speed skater

Tobias Schneider (born 23 July 1981, Berlin) is a German speedskater.

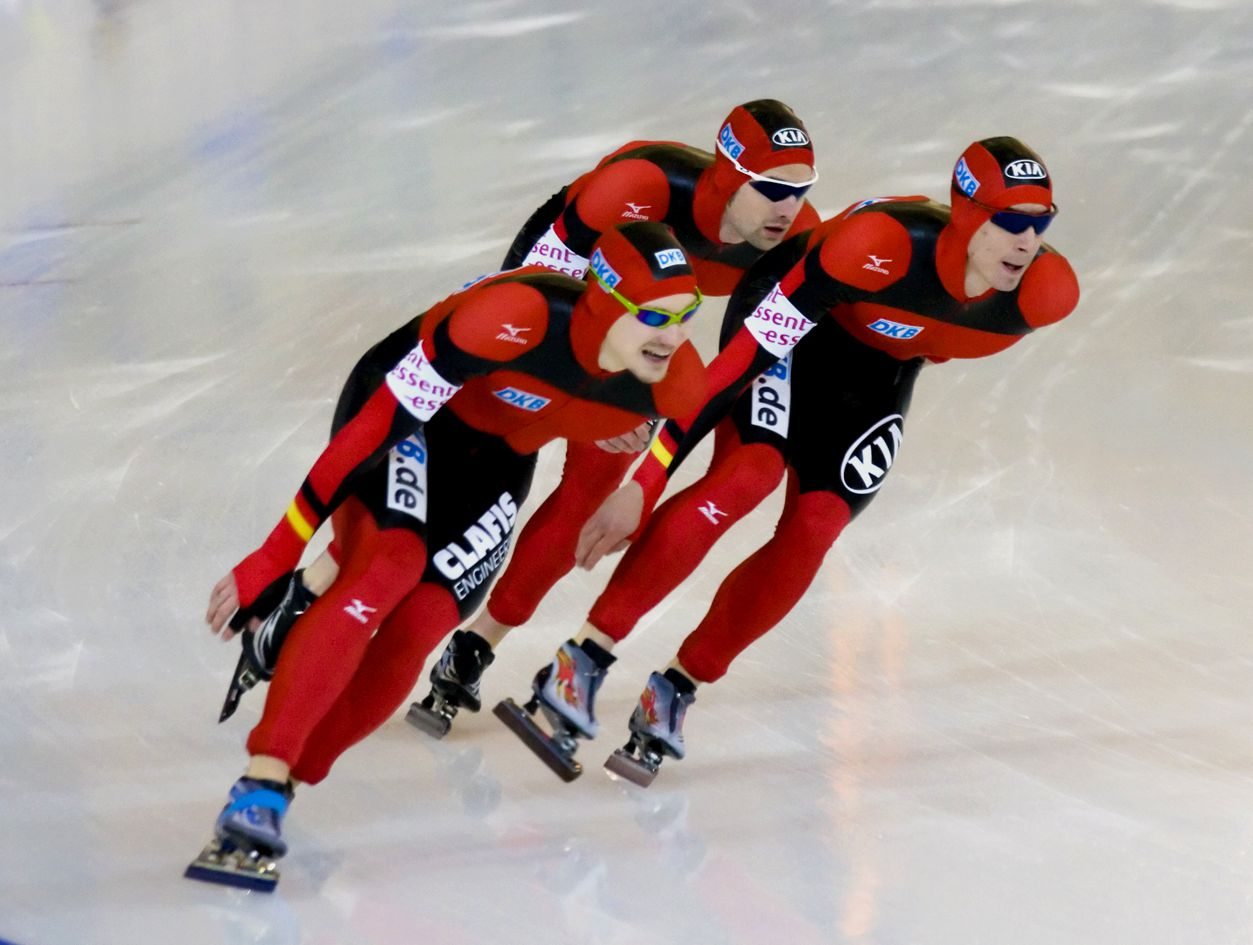
Team Germany Team Pursuit. Robert Lehmann. Tobias Schneider. Marco Weber

He is employed by the German Army as a Sportsoldat (sports soldier). His best distances are the longer ones, the 5,000 m and 10,000 m, but he is also among the best current German allround skaters. On 25 November 2006 at the World Cup in Moscow he set a new German record on the 10,000 m with 13:16.36. This also made him the highest ranked German speedskater on the Adelskalender – a year later he was surpassed by Robert Lehmann, however. In 2006 he was selected as deutscher Eisschnellläufer des Jahres (German speedskater of the year).

As of January 2008, his personal records are 36.94 (500-m), 1:45.82 (1,500 m), 6:21.55 (5,000 m) and 13:16.36 (10,000 m), and his Adelskalender rank is #26.
