= Yekaterina Abramova =

Russian speed skater (born 1982)

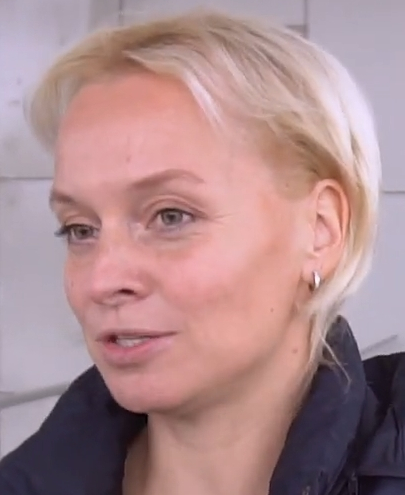
- Yekaterina Abramova in October 2019

Personal information
- Born: 14 April 1982 (age 44)
Medal record
Women's speed skating
Representing Russia
Olympic Games
Bronze medal – third place	2006 Turin	Team pursuit

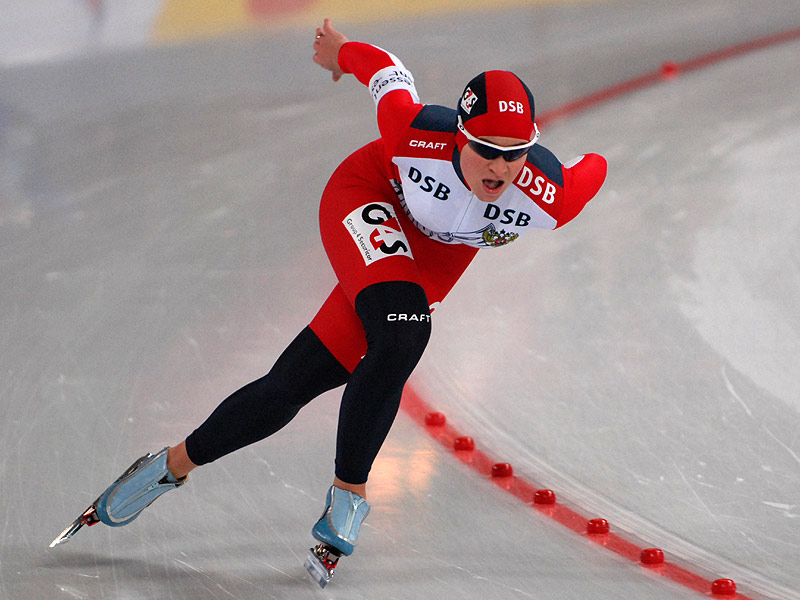
Abramova at the 2008 World Cup in Hamar

Yekaterina Konstantinovna Abramova (Russian: Екатери́на Константи́новна Абра́мова; born 14 April 1982) is a Russian speed skater who won a bronze medal in the women's team pursuit at the 2006 Winter Olympics.

== Personal records ==
To put these personal records in perspective, the WR column lists the official world records on the dates that Abramova skated her personal records.

Event	Result	Date	Venue	WR
500 m	39.08	18 March 2006	Calgary	37.22
1,000 m	1:16.02	11 March 2007	Salt Lake City	1:13.11
1,500 m	1:57.21	19 March 2006	Calgary	1:51.79
3,000 m	4:09.44	12 November 2005	Calgary	3:57.70
5,000 m	7:24.14	24 December 2006	Kolomna	6:46.91

Abramova has an Adelskalender score of 164.137 points.
