= Yulia Yasenok =

Belarusian speed skater (born 1983)

Yulia Yasenok or Yuliya Yasionak (Russian: Юлия Ясенок; Belarusian: Юлія Ясёнак; born July 9, 1983) is a Belarusian long track speed skater who participates in international competitions.

== Personal records ==
Personal records
Women's Speed skating
Event	Result	Date	Location	Notes
500 m	40.08	2007-11-09	Salt Lake City	
1,000 m	1:19.32	2007-11-18	Calgary	
1,500 m	2:01.31	2007-11-23	Calgary	
3,000 m	4:17.09	2007-11-24	Calgary	
5,000 m	7:43.60	2007-01-21	Turin	

=== Career highlights ===
European Allround Championships
2004 - Heerenveen, 24th
2005 - Heerenveen, 25th
2006 - Hamar, 25th
2007 - Collalbo, 21st
2008 - Kolomna, 19th
World Junior Allround Championships
2000 - Seinäjoki, 39th
2001 - Groningen, 26th
