= Daniela Anschütz-Thoms =

German speed skater

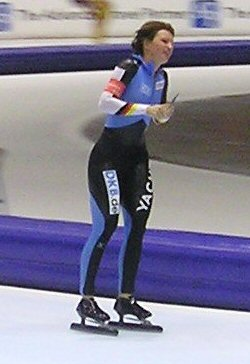
- Anschutz-Thoms in 2006

Personal information
- Born: 20 November 1974 (age 51) Erfurt, East Germany
- Height: 1.65 m (5 ft 5 in)
- Weight: 62 kg (137 lb; 9.8 st)

Sport
- Country: Germany
- Sport: Speed skating
Medal record
Women's speed skating
Representing Germany
Olympic Games
Gold medal – first place	2006 Turin	Team pursuit
Gold medal – first place	2010 Vancouver	Team pursuit
World Championships
Gold medal – first place	2005 Inzell	Team pursuit
Bronze medal – third place	2003 Gothenburg	Allround
Bronze medal – third place	2007 Salt Lake City	Team pursuit
Bronze medal – third place	2008 Nagano	3000 m
European Championships
Silver medal – second place	2005 Heerenveen	Allround
Silver medal – second place	2009 Heerenveen	Allround
Bronze medal – third place	2010 Hamar	Allround

Daniela Anschütz-Thoms (born 20 November 1974) is a German former speed skater. At the 2006 Winter Olympics, she won a gold medal in the women's team pursuit with the German team, and four years later she defended the title in Vancouver. She is married to former speed skater Marian Thoms since December 2005.

== Records ==
=== Personal records ===
Personal records
Women's speed skating
Event	Result	Date	Location	Notes
500 m	39.38	3 November 2007	Olympic Oval, Calgary	
1000 m	1:15.96	13 December 2009	Utah Olympic Oval, Salt Lake City	
1500 m	1:53.80	17 November 2007	Olympic Oval, Calgary	
3000 m	3:58.07	4 December 2009	Olympic Oval, Calgary	
5000 m	6:56.15	19 March 2006	Olympic Oval, Calgary	

=== World records ===
World records
Women's speed skating
Event	Result	Date	Location	Notes
Team pursuit	2:56.04	12 November 2005	Olympic Oval, Calgary	World record (with Claudia Pechstein and Anni Friesinger) until beaten by Kristina Groves, Brittany Schussler and Christine Nesbitt on 6 December 2009.

Records
Preceded by (Canada) Kristina Groves, Clara Hughes, Cindy Klassen	Women's team pursuit speed skating world record 12 November 2005 – 6 December 2009; With: Claudia Pechstein, Anni Friesinger	Succeeded by (Canada) Kristina Groves, Christine Nesbitt, Brittany Schussler
