= Maren Haugli =

Norwegian speed skater

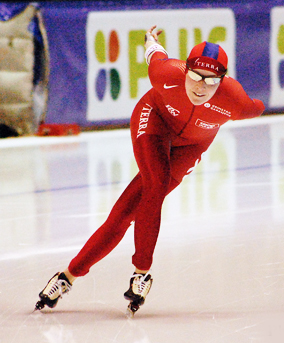
- World Cup Heerenveen, February 2009

Personal information
- Born: 3 March 1985 (age 41)
- Website: Official website

Sport
- Country: Norway
- Sport: Speed skating

Maren Haugli (born 3 March 1985) is a Norwegian retired long track speed skater who participated in international competitions.

She represents the sports club Jevnaker IF and is the granddaughter of Sverre Ingolf Haugli and sister of Sverre Haugli.

== Personal records ==
Personal records
Women's Speed skating
Event	Result	Date	Location	Notes
500 m	39.94	2006-03-18	Calgary	
1,000 m	1:18.99	2007-01-20	Hamar	
1,500 m	1:55.99	2006-03-19	Calgary	
3,000 m	4:00.34	2006-03-18	Calgary	
5,000 m	6:54.98	2006-03-19	Calgary	

=== Career highlights ===
Olympic Winter Games
2006 - Turin, 15th at 3000 m
2006 - Turin, 19th at 1500 m
2006 - Turin, 8th at 5000 m
2006 - Turin, 7th at team pursuit
World Allround Championships
2005 - Moscow, 22nd
2006 - Calgary, 5th
2009 - Hamar, 10th
World Single Distance Championships
2005 - Inzell, 12th at 3000 m
2005 - Inzell, 11th at 5000 m
World Sprint Championships
2007 - Hamar, 27th
European Allround Championships
2005 - Heerenveen, 13th
2006 - Hamar, 5th
2007 - Collalbo, 9th
2008 - Kolomna, 14th
2009 - Heerenveen, 9th
World Cup
2006 - Heerenveen, (bronze) 3rd at 3000 m
World Junior Allround Championships
2001 - Groningen, 23rd
2002 - Collalbo, 35th
2003 - Kushiro, 30th
2004 - Roseville, 17th
National Championships
2003 - Bergen, (bronze) 3rd at allround
2004 - Oslo, (bronze) 3rd at allround
2005 - Larvik, (bronze) 3rd at 500 m
2005 - Larvik, (gold) 1st at 3000 m
2005 - Larvik, (bronze) 3rd at 1500 m
2006 - Hamar, (gold) 1st at 1500 m
2006 - Hamar, (silver) 2nd at 1000 m
2006 - Hamar, (gold) 1st at 3000 m
2006 - Arendal, (gold) 1st at 5000 m
2006 - Arendal, (gold) 1st at allround
2006 - Asker, (silver) 2nd at sprint
2007 - Hamar, (gold) 1st at1500 m
2007 - Hamar, (gold) 1st at 3000 m
2008 - Hamar, (silver) 2nd at 1500 m
2008 - Hamar, (silver) 2nd 1st at 3000 m
2008 - Bjugn, (silver) 2nd at allround
2009 - Hamar, (gold) 1st at1500 m
2009 - Hamar, (gold) 1st at 3000 m
2009 - Gol, (gold) 1st at allround
