= Kris Schildermans =

Belgian speed skater

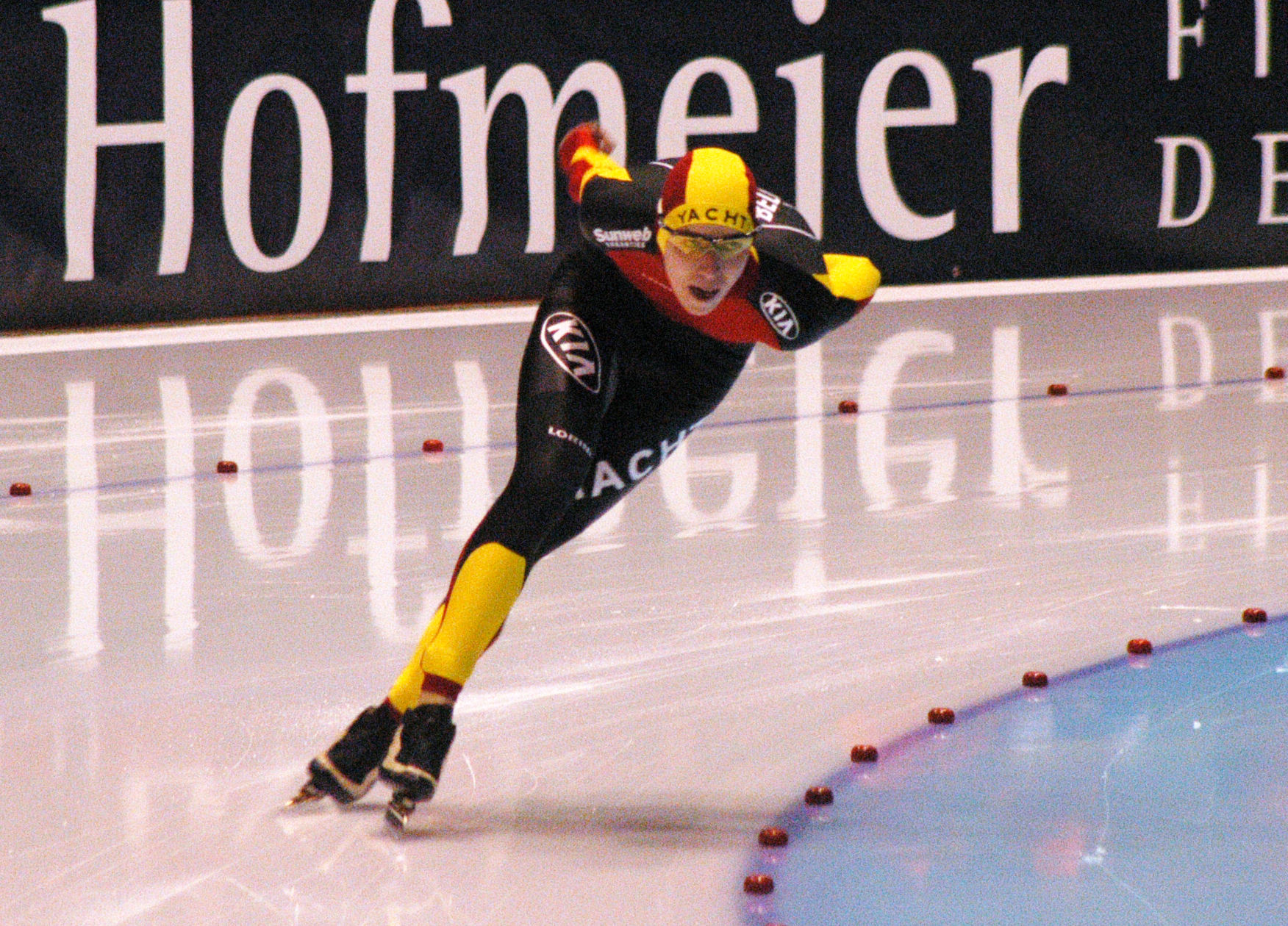
Kris Schildermans (09–12–2007)

Kris Schildermans (born 8 April 1984 in Neerpelt) is a Belgian long track speed skater who participates in international competitions.

By 11 January 2009, Schildermans was placed 262nd on the Adelskalender, the ranking list of all-time personal bests.

== Achievements ==
- European Speed Skating Championships for Men (3 participations):
  - 2007, 2008, 2009
    - Best result 28th in 2008

== Personal records ==
Personal records
Men's speed skating
Event	Result	Date	Location	Notes
500 m	39.72	2008-03-12	Olympic Oval, Calgary	
1,000 m	1:15.92	2008-03-08	Olympic Oval, Calgary	
1,500 m	1:52.96	2008-03-13	Olympic Oval, Calgary	
3,000 m	3:54.21	2007-11-03	Utah Olympic Oval, Salt Lake City	
5,000 m	6:35.56	2007-11-17	Olympic Oval, Calgary	
10,000 m	13:42.56	2008-03-14	Olympic Oval, Calgary	
