= Robert Lehmann (speed skater) =

German speed skater

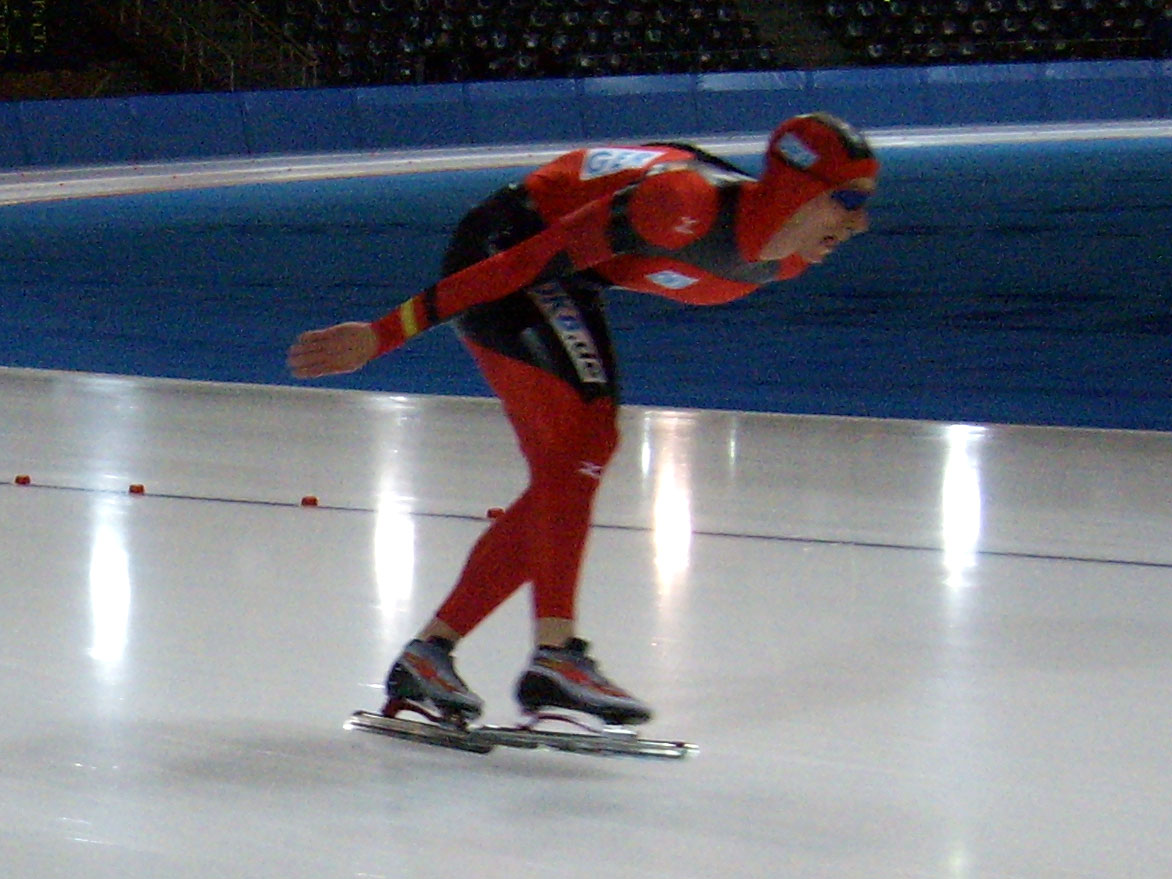
Robert Lehmann at the German Single Distanz Championship 2009

Robert Lehmann (born 9 January 1984 in Erfurt) is a German long track speed skater who participates in international competitions.

== Personal records ==
Personal records
Men's speed skating
Event	Result	Date	Location	Notes
500 m	36.34	9 January 2009	Heerenveen	
1000 m	1:12.41	21 December 2008	Berlin	
1500 m	1:45.03	11 December 2009	Salt Lake City	
3000 m	3:42.72	18 March 2009	Calgary	
5000 m	6:20.16	19 November 2005	Salt Lake City	
10000 m	13:22.33	10 March 2007	Salt Lake City	

=== Career highlights ===
Olympic Winter Games
2006 – Turin, 36th at 1500 m
2006 – Turin, 7th at team pursuit
European Allround Championships
2006 – Hamar, 17th
2008 – Kolomna, 12th
World Junior Allround Championships
2002 – Collalbo, 16th
2003 – Kushiro, (silver) 2nd
National Championships
2005 – Inzell, (silver) 2nd at allround
2006 – Erfurt, (bronze) 3rd at small allround
2008 – Inzell, (silver) 2nd at 500 m allround
2008 – Inzell, (gold) 1st at 1500 m allround
2008 – Inzell, (silver) 2nd at 3000 m allround
2008 – Inzell, (bronze) 3rd at 5000 m allround
European Youth-23 Games
2004 – Gothenburg, (silver) 2nd at 5000 m
2004 – Gothenburg, (silver) 2nd at 10000 m
