= Marco Weber =

German speed skater

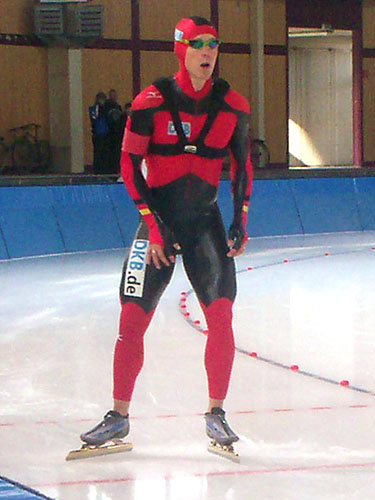
Marco Weber, Berlin 2008

Marco Weber (born 28 September 1982) is a German long track speed skater who participates in international competitions.

== Personal records ==
Personal records
Men's Speed skating
Event	Result	Date	Location	Notes
500 m	37.74	2008-01-12	Kolomna	
1,000 m	1:13.69	2002-03-23	Calgary	
1,500 m	1:50.28	2008-01-13	Kolomna	
3,000 m	3:49.25	2005-08-12	Calgary	
5,000 m	6:25.16	2007-03-03	Calgary	
10,000 m	13:18.60	2007-12-02	Kolomna	

=== Career highlights ===
World Single Distance Championships
2003 - Berlin, 21st at 5000 m
2005 - Inzell, 20th at 5000 m
2005 - Inzell, 7th at 10000 m
European Allround Championships
2005 - Heerenveen, 15th
2006 - Hamar, 22nd
2008 - Kolomna, 15th
World Junior Allround Championships
2001 - Groningen, 11th
2002 - Collalbo, 4th
National Championships
2004 - Erfurt, (bronze) 3rd at 10000 m
2005 - Berlin, (gold) 1st at 5000 m
2005 - Inzell, (gold) 1st at allround
2006 - Berlin, (gold) 1st at 5000 m
2007 - Erfurt, (silver) 2nd at 5000 m
2007 - Erfurt, (gold) 1st at 10000 m
2007 - Berlin, (silver) 2nd at allround
2008 - Inzell, (bronze) 3rd at 1500 m allround
2008 - Inzell, (silver) 2nd at 5000 m allround
European Youth-23 Games
2004 - Gothenburg, (gold) 1st at 5000 m
2004 - Gothenburg, (gold) 1st at 10000 m
Nordic Junior Games
2000 - Chemnitz, (silver) 2nd at 5000 m
