= Sverre Haugli (born 1982) =

Norwegian speed skater

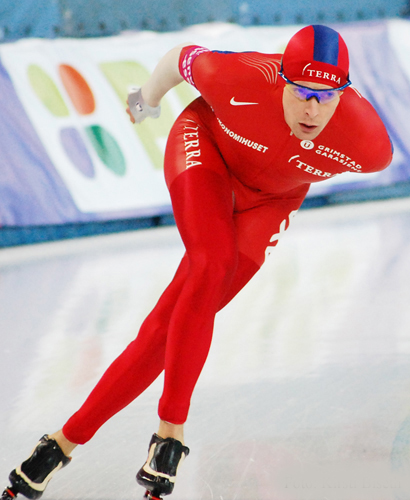
- 10 000 meter, World Allround Championships 2009

Personal information
- Born: 2 October 1982 (age 43)
- Website: Sverre Haugli Website

Sport
- Country: Norway
- Sport: Speed skating

Sverre Haugli (born 2 October 1982) is a Norwegian long track speed skater who participates in international competitions.

He represents the sports club Jevnaker IF and is the grandson of speed skater Sverre Ingolf Haugli and brother of Maren Haugli.

== Personal records ==
Personal records
Men's Speed skating
Event	Result	Date	Location	Notes
500 m	37.52	2007-02-24	Salt Lake City	
1,000 m	1:12.02	2006-03-24	Calgary	
1,500 m	1:46.98	2007-11-09	Salt Lake City	
3,000 m	3:45.22	2007-11-03	Salt Lake City	
5,000 m	6:18.09	2009-12-05	Calgary	
10,000 m	13:12.75	2008-11-23	Moscow	

=== Career highlights ===
World Allround Championships
2009 - Hamar, 9th
2010 - Heerenveen, 8th
European Allround Championships
2007 - Collalbo, 11th
2008 - Kolomna, 10th
2009 - Heerenveen, 7th
2010 - Hamar, 10th
National Championships
2007 - Geithus, (bronze) 3rd at allround
2008 - Bjugn, (silver) 2nd at allround
2009 - Hamar, (bronze) 3rd at 5000 m
2009 - Gol, (silver) 2nd at allround
European Youth-23 Games
2005 - Helsinki, (bronze) 3rd at 10000 m
