= Matteo Anesi =

Italian speed skater (born 1984)

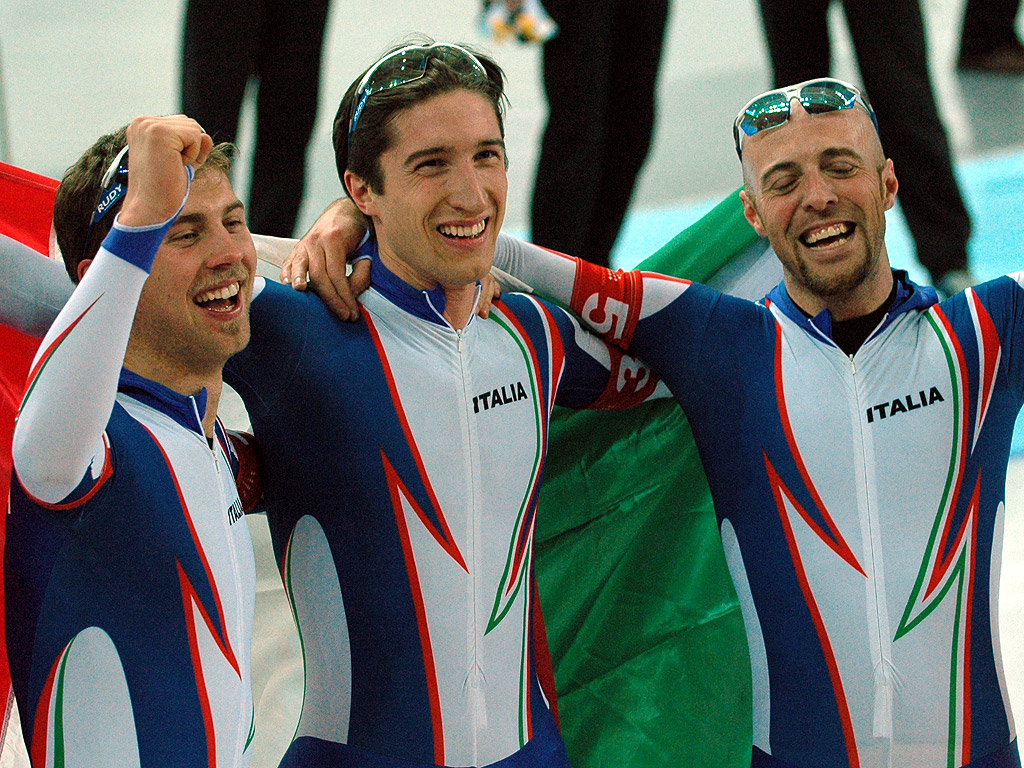
- Matteo Anesi (left) with Enrico Fabris and Ippolito Sanfratello

Personal information
- Born: 16 August 1984 (age 41) Trento, Italy
- Height: 185 cm (6 ft 1 in)
- Weight: 81 kg (179 lb)

Sport
- Sport: Speed skating
Medal record
Men's speed skating
Representing Italy
Olympic Games
Gold medal – first place	2006 Turin	Team pursuit
World Championships
Silver medal – second place	2005 Inzell	Team pursuit
Silver medal – second place	2008 Nagano	Team pursuit

Matteo Anesi (born 16 August 1984) is an Italian speed skater who won a gold medal in the team pursuit at the 2006 Winter Olympics. He placed 29th in the 1500 m event. After his active career he became one of the coaches of the Italian speed skating team.

== Personal records ==
Personal records
Men's speed skating
Event	Result	Date	Location	Notes
500 m	36.35	28 November 2009	Salt Lake City	
1000 m	1:08.43	13 December 2009	Salt Lake City	
1500 m	1:43.83	11 December 2009	Salt Lake City	
3000 m	3:45.97	5 November 2005	Calgary	
5000 m	6:28.37	5 December 2009	Calgary	
10000 m	14:01.78	17 February 2007	Erfurt	

== Personal life ==
Anesi is married to Dutch former speed skater Marrit Leenstra who is also an Olympic gold medalist.
