= 2011 KNSB Dutch Allround Championships =

- Venue: Thialf, Heerenveen
- Dates: 27–29 December 2010
- Competitors: 46

Medalist men
1st place, gold medalist(s)		Wouter olde Heuvel	NED
2nd place, silver medalist(s)		Koen Verweij	NED
3rd place, bronze medalist(s)		Jan Blokhuijsen	NED

Medalist women
1st place, gold medalist(s)		Marrit Leenstra	NED
2nd place, silver medalist(s)		Jorien Voorhuis	NED
3rd place, bronze medalist(s)		Diane Valkenburg	NED

The 2011 KNSB Dutch Allround Championships in speed skating were held at the Thialf ice stadium in Heerenveen, Netherlands, from 27 to 29 December 2010. Although the tournament was held in 2010 it was the 2011 edition as it is part of the 2010–11 speed skating season.

== Schedule ==
Schedule
Date	Time	Distances
Monday; 27 December 2010	14:30	Women's 500 meter Men's 500 meter
Tuesday; 28 December 2010	11:00	Women's 3000 meter Men's 5000 meter
Wednesday; 29 December 2010	13:15	Women's 1500 meter Men's 1500 meter Women's 5000 meter Men's 10000 meter

== Medalists ==
=== Allround ===
Distance	Gold		Silver		Bronze	
Men's allround	Wouter olde Heuvel	150.699	Koen Verweij	151.525	Jan Blokhuijsen	151.960
Women's allround	Marrit Leenstra	163.782	Jorien Voorhuis	165.342	Diane Valkenburg	166.089

=== Distance ===
Distance	Gold		Silver		Bronze	
Men's 500 m	Koen Verweij	36.27	Jan Blokhuijsen	36.50	Thomas Krol	36.63
Men's 1500 m	Wouter olde Heuvel	1:47.38	Renz Rotteveel	1:47.66	Tim Roelofsen	1:47.95
Men's 5000 m	Wouter olde Heuvel	6:23.17	Renz Rotteveel	6:24.40	Jan Blokhuijsen	6:26.25
Men's 10000 m	Wouter olde Heuvel	1:14.79	Arjen van der Kieft	13:16.74	Koen Verweij	13:30.79
Women's 500 m	Marrit Leenstra	39.21	Diane Valkenburg	40.13	Linda de Vries	40.24
Women's 1500 m	Marrit Leenstra	1:57.57	Diane Valkenburg	1:59.14	Jorien Voorhuis	1:59.61
Women's 3000 m	Diane Valkenburg	4:08.77	Jorien Voorhuis	4:09.11	Marrit Leenstra	4:09.14
Women's 5000 m	Jorien Voorhuis	7:15.24	Yvonne Nauta	7:17.75	Marrit Leenstra	7:18.59

== Men's results ==
=== 500 m ===
Place	Athlete	Time	Dif.
1	Koen Verweij	36.27
2	Jan Blokhuijsen	36.50	+ 0.23
3	Thomas Krol	36.63	+ 0.36
4	Bernd Zweden	36.84	+ 0.57
5	Wouter olde Heuvel	36.85	+ 0.58
6	Rigard van Klooster	36.94	+ 0.67
7	Renz Rotteveel	36.94	+ 0.67
8	Lucas van Alphen	36.96	+ 0.69
9	Ben Jongejan	37.01	+ 0.74
10	Maurice Vriend	37.03	+ 0.76
11	Adriaan van Velde	37.06	+ 0.79
12	Tim Roelofsen	37.21	+ 0.94
13	Ted-Jan Bloemen	37.33	+ 1.06
14	Frank Hermans	37.37	+ 1.10
15	Robbert de Rijk	37.41	+ 1.14
16	Pim Cazemier	37.58	+ 1.31
17	Bart van den Berg	37.68	+ 1.41
18	Thom van Beek	37.71	+ 1.44
19	Jos de Vos	38.09	+ 1.82
20	Ralph de Haan	38.10	+ 1.83
21	Marco Bos	38.60	+ 2.33
22	Boris Kusmirak	38.89	+ 2.62
23	Arjen van der Kieft	39.40	+ 3.13
24	Mark Ooijevaar	39.90	+ 3.63

=== 5000 m ===
Place	Athlete	Time	Dif.
1	Wouter olde Heuvel	6:23.17
2	Renz Rotteveel	6:24.40	+ 1.23
3	Jan Blokhuijsen	6:26.25	+ 3.08
4	Koen Verweij	6:27.16	+ 3.99
5	Ted-Jan Bloemen	6:27.30	+ 4.13
6	Arjen van der Kieft	6:27.39	+ 4.22
7	Ben Jongejan	6:31.88	+ 8.71
8	Frank Hermans	6:33.24	+ 10.07
9	Boris Kusmirak	6:33.80	+ 10.63
10	Tim Roelofsen	6:35.17	+ 12.00
11	Ralph de Haan	6:35.87	+ 12.70
12	Pim Cazemier	6:36.37	+ 13.20
13	Maurice Vriend	6:36.97	+ 13.80
14	Bart van den Berg	6:37.81	+ 14.64
15	Jos de Vos	6:38.19	+ 15.02
16	Marco Bos	6:38.67	+ 15.50
17	Thom van Beek	6:38.96	+ 15.79
18	Mark Ooijevaar	6:39.44	+ 16.27
19	Robbert de Rijk	6:42.75	+ 19.58
20	Adriaan van Velde	6:46.29	+ 23.12
21	Thomas Krol	6:46.30	+ 23.13
22	Lucas van Alphen	6:49.83	+ 26.66
23	Bernd Zweden	6:54.65	+ 31.48
24	Rigard van Klooster	6:55.29	+ 32.12

=== 1500 m ===
Place	Athlete	Time	Dif.
1	Wouter olde Heuvel	1:47.38
2	Renz Rotteveel	1:47.66	+ 0.28
3	Tim Roelofsen	1:47.95	+ 0.57
4	Koen Verweij	1:48.00	+ 0.62
5	Jan Blokhuijsen	1:48.75	+ 1.37
6	Pim Cazemier	1:48.81	+ 1.43
7	Ben Jongejan	1:48.99	+ 1.61
8	Frank Hermans	1:49.02	+ 1.64
9	Thomas Krol	1:49.53	+ 2.15
10	Thom van Beek	1:49.55	+ 2.17
11	Ted-Jan Bloemen	1:49.85	+ 2.47
12	Maurice Vriend	1:49.86	+ 2.48
13	Lucas van Alphen	1:50.05	+ 2.67
14	Robbert de Rijk	1:50.25	+ 2.87
15	Adriaan van Velde	1:50.28	+ 2.90
16	Ralph de Haan	1:50.29	+ 2.91
17	Bart van den Berg	1:50.48	+ 3.10
18	Arjen van der Kieft	1:51.18	+ 3.80
19	Boris Kusmirak	1:51.42	+ 4.04
20	Jos de Vos	1:51.77	+ 4.39
21	Rigard van Klooster	1:51.78	+ 4.40
22	Bernd Zweden	1:51.84	+ 4.46
23	Marco Bos	1:52.41	+ 5.03
24	Mark Ooijevaar	1:52.58	+ 5.20

=== 10000 m ===
Place	Athlete	Time	Dif.
1	Wouter olde Heuvel	13:14.79
2	Arjen van der Kieft	13:16.74	+ 1.95
3	Koen Verweij	13:30.79	+ 16.00
4	Jan Blokhuijsen	13:31.71	+ 16.92
5	Renz Rotteveel	13:38.36	+ 23.57
6	Ted-Jan Bloemen	13:40.30	+ 25.51
7	Frank Hermans	13:47.36	+ 32.57
8	Tim Roelofsen	13:49.39	+ 34.60
9	Ben Jongejan	13:51.57	+ 36.78
10	Boris Kusmirak	13:54.10	+ 39.31
11	Maurice Vriend	14:03.49	+ 48.70
12	Pim Cazemier	14:30.71	+ 75.92

=== Final results ===
Place	Athlete	Country	500 m	5000 m	1500 m	10000 m	Points
1st place, gold medalist(s)	Wouter olde Heuvel	Netherlands	36.85 (5)	6:23.17 (1)	1:47.38 (1)	13:14.79 (1) pr	150.699
2nd place, silver medalist(s)	Koen Verweij	Netherlands	36.27 (1) pr	6:27.16 (4)	1:48.00 (4)	13:30.97 (3)	151.525
3rd place, bronze medalist(s)	Jan Blokhuijsen	Netherlands	36.50 (2)	6:26.25 (3)	1:48.75 (4)	13:31.79 (4)	151.960
4	Renz Rotteveel	Netherlands	36.94 (6) pr	6:24.40 (2) pr	1:47.66 (2) pr	13:38.36 (5) pr	152.184
5	Ted-Jan Bloemen	Netherlands	37.33 (13)	6:27.30 (5)	1:49.85 (11)	13:40.30 (6)	153.691
6	Ben Jongejan	Netherlands	37.01 (9)	6:31.88 (7)	1:48.99 (7)	13:51.57 (9)	154.106
7	Tim Roelofsen	Netherlands	37.21 (12)	6:35.17 (10)	1:47.95 (3)	13:49.39 (8)	154.179
8	Frank Hermans	Netherlands	37.37 (14)	6:33.24 (8) pr	1:49.02 (8) pr	13:47.36 (7) pr	154.402
9	Arjen van der Kieft	Netherlands	39.40 (23)	6:27.39 (6)	1:51.18 (18) pr	13:16.74 (2)	155.036
10	Maurice Vriend	Netherlands	37.03 (10)	6:36.97 (13) pr	1:49.86 (12)	14:03.71 (11) pr	155.521
11	Pim Cazemier	Netherlands	37.58 (16)	6:36.37 (12) pr	1:48.81 (6)	14:30.71 (12)	157.022
12	Boris Kusmirak	Netherlands	38.89 (22)	6:33.80 (9)	1:51.42 (19)	13:54.11 (10)	157.115
NQ13	Thomas Krol	Netherlands	36.63 (3)	6:46.30 (21) pr	1:49.53 (9) pr		113.770
NQ14	Thom van Beek	Netherlands	37.71 (18)	6:38.96 (17) pr	1:49.55 (10) pr		114.122
NQ15	Bart van den Berg	Netherlands	37.68 (17)	6:37.81 (14)	1:50.48 (17)		114.287
NQ16	Robbert de Rijk	Netherlands	37.41 (15)	6:42.75 (19)	1:50.25 (14)		114.435
NQ17	Adriaan van Velde	Netherlands	37.06 (11) pr	6:46.29 (20) pr	1:50.28 (15) pr		114.449
NQ18	Ralph de Haan	Netherlands	38.10 (20)	6:35.87 (11)	1:50.29 (16)		114.550
NQ19	Lucas van Alphen	Netherlands	36.96 (8) pr	6:49.83 (22)	1:50.05 (13) pr		114.626
NQ20	Jos de Vos	Netherlands	38.09 (19) pr	6:38.19 (15) pr	1:51.77 (20) pr		115.165
NQ21	Bernd Zweden	Netherlands	36.84 (4) pr	6:54.65 (23) pr	1:51.84 (22) pr		115.585
NQ22	Rigard van Klooster	Netherlands	36.94 (6)	6:55.29 (24)	1:51.78 (21)		115.729
NQ23	Marco Bos	Netherlands	38.60 (21)	6:38.67 (16) pr	1:52.41 (23)		115.937
NQ24	Mark Ooijevaar	Netherlands	39.90 (24)	6:39.44 (18)	1:52.88 (24)		117.370

NQ = not qualified for the 10000 m
pr = persenol record

Source: Schaatsstatistieken.nl & Schaatsupdate.nl: 500 m, 5000 m, 1500 m, 10000 m

== Women's results ==
=== 500 m ===
Place	Athlete	Time	Dif.
1	Marrit Leenstra	39.21
2	Diane Valkenburg	40.13	+ 0.92
3	Linda de Vries	40.24	+ 1.03
4	Jorien Voorhuis	40.43	+ 1.22
5	Jorieke van der Geest	40.54	+ 1.33
6	Paulien van Deutekom	40.60	+ 1.39
7	Rixt Meijer	40.69	+ 1.48
8	Irene Schouten	40.75	+ 1.54
9	Annouk van der Weijden	40.76	+ 1.55
10	Miranda Dekker	40.88	+ 1.67
11	Cindy Vergeer	40.88	+ 1.67
12	Marije Joling	40.90	+ 1.69
13	Carlijn Achtereekte	40.94	+ 1.73
14	Yvonne Nauta	41.06	+ 1.85
15	Reina Anema	41.13	+ 1.92
16	Lisette van der Geest	41.16	+ 1.95
17	Moniek Kleinsman	41.18	+ 1.97
18	Pien Keulstra	41.19	+ 1.98
19	Iris van der Stelt	41.32	+ 2.11
20	Charlotte Bakker	41.35	+ 2.14
21	Eline Bennis	41.62	+ 2.41
	Janneke Ensing	DQ

=== 3000 m ===
Place	Athlete	Time	Dif.
1	Diane Valkenburg	4:08.77
2	Jorien Voorhuis	4:09.11	+ 0.34
3	Marrit Leenstra	4:09.14	+ 0.37
4	Linda de Vries	4:11.76	+ 2.99
5	Yvonne Nauta	4:12.23	+ 3.46
6	Annouk van der Weijden	4:13.46	+ 4.69
7	Paulien van Deutekom	4:14.04	+ 5.27
8	Lisette van der Geest	4:14.46	+ 5.69
9	Carlijn Achtereekte	4:14.68	+ 5.91
10	Janneke Ensing	4:16.05	+ 7.28
11	Moniek Kleinsman	4:17.00	+ 8.23
12	Irene Schouten	4:17.30	+ 8.53
13	Rixt Meijer	4:17.35	+ 8.58
14	Cindy Vergeer	4:18.50	+ 9.73
15	Pien Keulstra	4:19.54	+ 10.77
16	Jorieke van der Geest	4:21.69	+ 12.92
17	Reina Anema	4:22.69	+ 13.92
18	Miranda Dekker	4:22.85	+ 14.08
19	Eline Bennis	4:25.08	+ 16.31
20	Charlotte Bakker	4:25.81	+ 17.04
21	Iris van der Stelt	4:29.78	+ 21.01
	Marije Joling	DQ

=== 1500 m ===
Place	Athlete	Time	Dif.
1	Marrit Leenstra	1:57.57
2	Diane Valkenburg	1:59.14	+ 1.57
3	Jorien Voorhuis	1:59.61	+ 2.04
4	Linda de Vries	1:59.66	+ 2.09
5	Yvonne Nauta	2:00.50	+ 2.93
6	Irene Schouten	2:01.82	+ 4.25
7	Paulien van Deutekom	2:01.87	+ 4.30
8	Lisette van der Geest	2:01.90	+ 4.33
9	Rixt Meijer	2:02.24	+ 4.67
10	Miranda Dekker	2:02.25	+ 4.68
11	Pien Keulstra	2:02.34	+ 4.77
11	Carlijn Achtereekte	2:02.34	+ 4.77
13	Cindy Vergeer	2:02.74	+ 5.17
14	Jorieke van der Geest	2:03.35	+ 5.78
15	Janneke Ensing	2:03.59	+ 6.02
16	Eline Bennis	2:04.35	+ 6.78
17	Charlotte Bakker	2:04.62	+ 7.05
18	Annouk van der Weijden	2:04.63	+ 7.06
19	Moniek Kleinsman	2:05.32	+ 7.75
20	Iris van der Stelt	2:05.72	+ 8.15
21	Reina Anema	2:06.26	+ 8.69

=== 5000 m ===
Place	Athlete	Time	Dif.
1	Jorien Voorhuis	7:15.24
2	Yvonne Nauta	7:17.75	+ 2.51
3	Marrit Leenstra	7:18.59	+ 3.35
4	Carlijn Achtereekte	7:20.19	+ 4.95
5	Linda de Vries	7:21.85	+ 6.61
6	Annouk van der Weijden	7:25.56	+ 10.32
7	Rixt Meijer	7:25.68	+ 10.44
8	Diane Valkenburg	7:27.85	+ 12.61
9	Irene Schouten	7:28.41	+ 13.17
10	Paulien van Deutekom	7:36.25	+ 21.01

=== Final results ===
Place	Athlete	Country	500 m	3000 m	1500 m	5000 m	Points
1st place, gold medalist(s)	Marrit Leenstra	Netherlands	39.21 (1)	4:09.14 (3)	1:57.57 (1)	7:18.59 (3)	163.782
2nd place, silver medalist(s)	Jorien Voorhuis	Netherlands	40.43 (4)	4:09.11 (2)	1:59.61 (3)	7:15.24 (1)	165.342
3rd place, bronze medalist(s)	Diane Valkenburg	Netherlands	40.13 (2) pr	4:08.77 (1)	1:59.14 (2)	7:27.85 (8) (+fall)	166.089
4	Linda de Vries	Netherlands	40.24 (3) pr	4:11.76 (4) pr	1:59.66 (4) pr	7:21.85 (5) pr	166.271 pr
5	Yvonne Nauta	Netherlands	41.06 (14)	4:12.23 (5)	2:00.50 (5) pr	7:17.75 (2) pr	167.040 pr
6	Carlijn Achtereekte	Netherlands	40.94 (13) pr	4:14.68 (9) pr	2:02.34 (11) pr	7:20.19 (4)	168.185 pr
7	Rixt Meijer	Netherlands	40.69 (7) pr	4:17.35 (13) pr	2:02.24 (9) pr	7:25.68 (7) pr	168.895 pr
8	Irene Schouten	Netherlands	40.75 (7) pr	4:17.30 (12) pr	2:01.82 (6) pr	7:28.41 (9)	169.080 pr
9	Annouk van der Weijden	Netherlands	40.76 (6)	4:13.46 (6) pr	2:04.63 (18)	7:25.56 (6)	169.102
10	Paulien van Deutekom	Netherlands	40.60 (6)	4:14.04 (7)	2:01.57 (7)	7:36.25 (10)	169.188
11	Lisette van der Geest	Netherlands	41.16 (16)	4:14.46 (8)	2:01.90 (18)	DNS	124.203
NQ12	Cindy Vergeer	Netherlands	40.88 (10) pr	4:18.50 (14) pr	2:02.74 (13) pr		124.876
NQ13	Pien Keulstra	Netherlands	41.19 (18)	4:19.54 (15)	2:02.34 (11)		125.226
NQ14	Jorieke van der Geest	Netherlands	40.54 (5) pr	4:21.69 (16) pr	2:03.35 (14) pr		125.271
NQ15	Miranda Dekker	Netherlands	40.88 (10) pr	4:22.85 (18) pr	2:02.25 (10) pr		125.438
NQ16	Moniek Kleinsman	Netherlands	41.18 (17)	4:17.00 (11)	2:05.35 (19)		125.786
NQ17	Reina Anema	Netherlands	41.13 (15) pr	4:22.69 (17) pr	2:06.26 (21)		126.997
NQ18	Charlotte Bakker	Netherlands	41.35 (20)	4:25.81 (20)	2:04.62 (17)		127.191
NQ19	Eline Bennis	Netherlands	41.62 (21) pr	4:25.08 (19) pr	2:04.35 (16) pr		127.250
NQ20	Iris van der Stelt	Netherlands	41.32 (19) pr	4:29.78 (21)	2:05.72 (20) pr		128.189
-	Marije Joling	Netherlands	40.90 (12)	DQ	2:03.59 (15)		83.871
-	Janneke Ensing	Netherlands	DQ	4:16.05 (10)	DNS		40.900

NQ = not qualified for the 5000 m
DQ = disqualified
DNS = did not start
pr = persenol record

Source: Schaatsstatistieken.nl & Schaatsupdate.nl: 500 m, 5000 m, 1500 m, 10000 m
