= 2013 KNSB Dutch Allround Championships =

- Venue: Thialf, Heerenveen
- Dates: 29–30 December 2012
- Competitors: 50

Medalist men
1st place, gold medalist(s)		Sven Kramer	NED
2nd place, silver medalist(s)		Jan Blokhuijsen	NED
3rd place, bronze medalist(s)		Renz Rotteveel	NED

Medalist women
1st place, gold medalist(s)		Jorien ter Mors	NED
2nd place, silver medalist(s)		Ireen Wüst	NED
3rd place, bronze medalist(s)		Diane Valkenburg	NED

The 2013 KNSB Dutch Allround Championships in speed skating were held at the Thialf ice stadium in Heerenveen, Netherlands from 29 to 30 December 2012. The tournament was part of the 2012–2013 speed skating season.

== Schedule ==
Schedule
Date	Time	Distances
Saturday; 29 December 2012	12:15	Women's 500 meter Men's 500 meter Women's 3000 meter Men's 5000 meter
Sunday; 30 December 2012	13:15	Women's 1500 meter Men's 1500 meter Women's 5000 meter Men's 10000 meter

== Medalists ==
=== Allround ===
Distance	Gold		Silver		Bronze	
Men's Allround	Sven Kramer	148,076	Jan Blokhuijsen	148,296	Renz Rotteveel	153,041
Women's Allround	Jorien ter Mors	161.670	Ireen Wüst	162.421	Diane Valkenburg	162.869

=== Distance ===
Distance	Gold		Silver		Bronze	
Men's 500 m	Lucas van Alphen	36.17	Jan Blokhuijsen	36.29	Thomas Krol	36.56
Men's 1500 m	Sven Kramer	1:46.19	Jan Blokhuijsen	1:46.85	Renz Rotteveel	1:47.84
Men's 5000 m	Sven Kramer	6:10.37	Jan Blokhuijsen	6:12.19	Bob de Jong	6:20.37
Men's 10000 m	Bob de Jong	12:58.34	Sven Kramer	12:59.66	Jan Blokhuijsen	13:03.42
Women's 500 m	Ireen Wüst	39.52	Jorien ter Mors	39.56	Diane Valkenburg	39.97
Women's 1500 m	Jorien ter Mors	1:56.34	Ireen Wüst	1:56.89	Linda de Vries	1:57.73
Women's 3000 m	Jorien ter Mors	4:03.91	Diane Valkenburg	4:05.71	Ireen Wüst	4:06.44
Women's 5000 m	Jorien ter Mors	7:06.79	Diane Valkenburg	7:06.98	Ireen Wüst	7:08.65

== Men's results ==
Place	Athlete	500m	5000m	1500m	10,000m	Points
1st place, gold medalist(s)	Sven Kramer	36.66 (5)	6:10.37 (1) TR	1:46.19 (1)	12:59.66 (2)	148.076
2nd place, silver medalist(s)	Jan Blokhuijsen	36.29 (2)	6:12.19 (2)	1:46.85 (2)	13:03.42 (3)	148.296
3rd place, bronze medalist(s)	Renz Rotteveel	36.96 (7)	6:33.70 (7)	1:47.84 (3)	13:35.30 (6)	153.041
4	Ted-Jan Bloemen	37.79 (16)	6:28.00 (4)	1:49.42 (8)	13:21.24 (4)	153.125
5	Bob de Jong	39.22 (23)	6:20.37 (3)	1:51.00 (13)	12:58.34 (1)	153.174 PR
6	Maurice Vriend	36.59 (4)	6:35.08 (9)	1:47.96 (4)	13:56.43 (8)	153.905
7	Frank Hermans	37.05 (8)	6:33.76 (8)	1:49.33 (7)	13:43.14 (7)	154.026 PR
8	Arjen van der Kieft	39.65 (24)	6:29.82 (5)	1:52.32 (19)	13:23.48 (5)	156.246
NC9	Lucas van Alphen	36.17 (1)	6:39.75 (13)	1:48.66 (5)	–	112.365
NC10	Jos de Vos	37.03 (12)	6:35.13 (10)	1:50.34 (11)	–	113.593
NC11	Thomas Krol	36.56 (3)	6:47.32 (19)	1:49.11 (6)	–	113.662
NC12	Douwe de Vries	37.73 (14)	6:32.67 (6)	1:50.69 (12)	–	113.893
NC13	Thom van Beek	37.22 (10)	6:41.83 (14)	1:49.92 (10)	–	114.043
NC14	Adriaan van Velde	37.27 (11)	6:45.52 (18) PR	1:51.04 (14)	–	114.835
NC15	Kai Verbij	36.07 (6)	6:56.51 (22)	1:49.64 (9)	–	114.897
NC16	Sebastiaan Oranje	37.87 (17)	6:44.56 (17) PR	1:51.79 (17)	–	115.589
NC17	Pim Cazemier	38.62 (22)	6:39.46 (12)	1:51.56 (15)	–	115.752
NC18	Jorjan Jorritsma	37.76 (15)	6:42.44 (15)	1:53.30 (21)	–	115.770
NC19	Hardrik de Vries	38.18 (19)	6:43.58 (16) PR	1:52.23 (18) PR	–	115.948 PR
NC20	Bart van den Berg	37.64 (13)	6:52.65 (21)	1:51.68 (16)	–	116.131
NC21	Tom Terpstra	38.37 (21)	6:51.92 (20)	1:52.57 (20) PR	–	117.085
NC22	Maico Voets	37.89 (18)	6:59.07 (24)	1:53.42 (22)	–	117.603
NC23	Mark Ooijevaar	39.97 (25)	6:37.43 (11)	1:55.53 (25)	–	118.223
NC24	Cas van Trierum	38.28 (20)	6:58.52 (23)	1:54.84 (24)	–	118.412
NC	Dedjer Wymenga	37.02 (9)	– DQ	1:54.46 (23)
NC	Koen Verweij	1:11.14 (26)↓	– DNS

- ↓ Fell

Men's results: SchaatsStatistieken.nl

== Women's Results ==
Place	Athlete	500m	3000m	1500m	5000m	Points
1st place, gold medalist(s)	Jorien ter Mors	39.56 2)	4:03.91 (1)	1:56.34 (1)	7:06.79 (1)	161.670 PR
2nd place, silver medalist(s)	Ireen Wüst	39.52 (1)	4:06.44 (3)	1:56.89 (2)	7:08.65 (3)	162.421
3rd place, bronze medalist(s)	Diane Valkenburg	39.97 (3)	4:05.71 (2)	1:57.75 (4)	7:06.98 (2)	162.869
4	Linda de Vries	40.20 (7)	4:07.58 (4)	1:57.73 (3)	7:09.60 (4)	163.666
5	Antoinette de Jong	40.08 (5)	4:09.62 (7)	1:59.92 (6)	7:16.54 (5)	165.310
6	Annouk van der Weijden	40.41 (8)	4:09.35 (5)	2:00.41 (8)	7:22.52 (7)	166.356
7	Yvonne Nauta	40.82 (12)	4:11.50 (8)	2:00.21 (7)	7:16.63 (6)	166.469
NC8	Marije Joling	40.07 (4)	4:09.37 (6)	2:00.59 (9)	–	121.827
NC9	Jorien Voorhuis	40.19 (6)	4:11.64 (9)	1:59.46 (5)	– DQ	121.950
NC10	Carlijn Achtereekte	40.05 (9)	4:14.32 (11)	2:01.62 (14)	–	123.426
NC11	Irene Schouten	40.56 (10)	4:16.67 (13)	2:01.63 (15)	–	123.881
NC12	Mariska Huisman	41.54 (20)	4:12.78 (10)	2:00.73 (11)	–	123.913
NC13	Janneke Ensing	40.09 (13)	4:15.15 (12)	2:02.60 (18)	–	124.291
NC14	Reina Anema	40.69 (11)	4:20.17 (18)	2:01.09 (12)	–	124.414
NC15	Rianne Hadders	41.27 (17) PR	4:18.59 (14) PR	2:01.43 (13) PR	–	124.844
NC16	Carla Zielman	40.91 (14) PR	4:19.86 (17)	2:02.12 (16)	–	124.926
NC17	Imke Vormeer	41.25 (16) PR	4:18.93 (15)	2:02.74 (19)	–	125.318
NC18	Miranda Dekker	41.34 (19)	4:22.81 (19)	2:00.65 (10)	–	125.357
NC19	Jade van der Molen	41.55 (21)	4:19.52 (16)	2:02.47 (17)	–	125.626
NC20	Charlotte Bakker	41.17 (15) PR	4:27.75 (21)	2:03.29 (20) PR	–	126.891
NC21	Julia Berentschot	41.32 (18)	4:28.10 (22)	2:06.17 (21)	–	128.059
NC22	José Boots	41.73 (22)	4:30.96 (23)	2:06.37 (22)	–	129.013
NC23	Carlijn Schoutens	43.11 (24)	4:27.74 (20)	2:08.44 (24)	–	130.546
NC24	Natasja Roest	42.93 (23)	4:32.20 (24)	2:07.88 (23)	–	130.922

Women's results: SchaatsStatistieken.nl
