= 2010 KNSB Dutch Single Distance Championships – Women's 3000 m =

- Venue: Thialf, Heerenveen, Netherlands
- Date: 31 October 2009
- Competitors: 20 skaters

Medalist men
1st place, gold medalist(s)		Ireen Wüst	NED
2nd place, silver medalist(s)		Renate Groenewold	NED
3rd place, bronze medalist(s)		Diane Valkenburg	NED

The women's 3000 meter at the 2010 KNSB Dutch Single Distance Championships took place in Heerenveen at the Thialf ice skating rink on Saturday 31 October 2009. Although this tournament was held in 2009, it was part of the 2009–2010 speed skating season.

There were 20 participants.

Title holder was Renate Groenewold.

The first 5 skaters qualified for the following 2009–10 ISU Speed Skating World Cup tournaments.

== Overview ==
=== Result ===
Rank	Skater	Time
1st place, gold medalist(s)	Ireen Wüst	4:11.52
2nd place, silver medalist(s)	Renate Groenewold	4:12.46
3rd place, bronze medalist(s)	Diane Valkenburg	4:13.29
4	Moniek Kleinsman	4:13.78
5	Annouk van der Weijden	4:15.25
6	Gretha Smit	4:15.57
7	Yvonne Nauta	4:16.18 PR
8	Elma de Vries	4:16.79
9	Paulien van Deutekom	4:17.52
10	Jorien Voorhuis	4:18.14
11	Linda Bouwens	4:18.26
12	Marrit Leenstra	4:18.47
13	Janneke Ensing	4:19.09
14	Marja Vis	4:20.97
15	Linda de Vries	4:21.35 PR
16	Rixt Meijer	4:21.42
17	Carlijn Achtereekte	4:23.01 PR
18	Irene Schouten	4:24.09
19	Marije Joling	4:24.54
20	Lisanne Soemanta	DQ

DQ = Disqualified

=== Draw ===
Heat	Inner lane	Outer lane
1	Marije Joling	Carlijn Achtereekte
2	Irene Schouten	Linda de Vries
3	Linda Bouwens	Marja Vis
4	Annouk van der Weijden	Janneke Ensing
5	Yvonne Nauta	Moniek Kleinsman
6	Rixt Meijer	Lisanne Soemanta
7	Paulien van Deutekom	Gretha Smit
8	Elma de Vries	Jorien Voorhuis
9	Ireen Wüst	Renate Groenewold
10	Marrit Leenstra	Diane Valkenburg
