= 2011 KNSB Dutch Single Distance Championships – Women's 3000 m =

- Venue: Thialf, Heerenveen, Netherlands
- Date: 6 November 2010
- Competitors: 20 skaters

Medalist men
1st place, gold medalist(s)		Ireen Wüst	NED
2nd place, silver medalist(s)		Marrit Leenstra	NED
3rd place, bronze medalist(s)		Marije Joling	NED

The women's 3000 meter at the 2011 KNSB Dutch Single Distance Championships took place in Heerenveen at the Thialf ice skating rink on Saturday 6 November 2010. Although this tournament was held in 2010, it was part of the 2010–2011 speed skating season.

There were 20 participants.

Title holder was Ireen Wüst.

The first 5 skaters qualified for the following 2010–11 ISU Speed Skating World Cup tournaments.

== Overview ==
=== Result ===
Rank	Skater	Time
1st place, gold medalist(s)	Ireen Wüst	4:12.32
2nd place, silver medalist(s)	Marrit Leenstra	4:14.71
3rd place, bronze medalist(s)	Marije Joling	4:15.41 PR
4	Irene Schouten	4:16.41 PR
5	Moniek Kleinsman	4:16.99
6	Jorien Voorhuis	4:17.24
7	Lisette van der Geest	4:17.37
8	Carlijn Achtereekte	4:17.45 PR
9	Linda de Vries	4:17.73 PR
10	Pien Keulstra	4:18.15 PR
11	Yvonne Nauta	4:18.34
12	Maria Sterk	4:19.90 PR
13	Elma de Vries	4:20.33
14	Janneke Ensing	4:21.82
15	Rixt Meijer	4:22.18
16	Annouk van der Weijden	4:23.08
17	Imke Vormeer	4:23.40 PR
18	Miranda Dekker	4:24.38 PR
19	Charlotte Bakker	4:25.24 PR
20	Diane Valkenburg	4:54.70

=== Draw ===
Heat	Inner lane	Outer lane
1	Miranda Dekker	Charlotte Bakker
2	Imke Vormeer	Maria Sterk
3	Irene Schouten	Pien Keulstra
4	Lisette van der Geest	Rixt Meijer
5	Linda de Vries	Marrit Leenstra
6	Carlijn Achtereekte	Marije Joling
7	Moniek Kleinsman	Janneke Ensing
8	Annouk van der Weijden	Elma de Vries
9	Jorien Voorhuis	Diane Valkenburg
10	Yvonne Nauta	Ireen Wüst
