= 2013 KNSB Dutch Single Distance Championships – Men's 10,000 m =

Dutch speed skating competition

- Venue: Thialf, Heerenveen
- Dates: 11 November 2012
- Competitors: 11

Medalist men
| 1st place, gold medalist(s) | | Jorrit Bergsma | NED |
| 2nd place, silver medalist(s) | | Bob de Jong | NED |
| 3rd place, bronze medalist(s) | | Jan Blokhuijsen | NED |

The men's 10,000 meter at the 2013 KNSB Dutch Single Distance Championships took place in Heerenveen at the Thialf ice skating rink on Sunday 11 November 2012. Although this tournament was held in 2012 it was part of the speed skating season 2012–2013. There were 11 participants.

== Statistics ==
=== Result ===
| Position | Skater | Time |
|---|---|---|
| 1st place, gold medalist(s) | Jorrit Bergsma | 12:57.42 |
| 2nd place, silver medalist(s) | Bob de Jong | 12:59.07 |
| 3rd place, bronze medalist(s) | Jan Blokhuijsen | 13:06.99 |
| 4 | Ted-Jan Bloemen | 13:15.23 |
| 5 | Rob Hadders | 13:17.96 |
| 6 | Arjen van der Kieft | 13:18.68 |
| 7 | Frank Vreugdenhil | 13:22.02 |
| 8 | Douwe de Vries | 13:26.67 |
| 9 | Bob de Vries | 13:30.43 |
| 10 | Robert Bovenhuis | 13:31.11 |
| 11 | Mark Ooijevaar | 13:36.55 |

=== Draw ===
| Heat | Inside lane | Outside lane |
|---|---|---|
| 1 | Frank Vreugdenhil | |
| 2 | Mark Ooijevaar | Robert Bovenhuis |
| 3 | Rob Hadders | Arjen van der Kieft |
| 4 | Jan Blokhuijsen | Ted-Jan Bloemen |
| 5 | Douwe de Vries | Bob de Jong |
| 6 | Bob de Vries | Jorrit Bergsma |
