= 2012 KNSB Dutch Single Distance Championships – Men's 5000 m =

Dutch speed skating competition

- Venue: Thialf, Heerenveen
- Dates: 4 November 2011
- Competitors: 22 skaters

Medalist men
1st place, gold medalist(s)		Jorrit Bergsma	NED
2nd place, silver medalist(s)		Bob de Jong	NED
3rd place, bronze medalist(s)		Sven Kramer	NED

The men's 5000 meter at the 2012 KNSB Dutch Single Distance Championships took place in Heerenveen at the Thialf ice skating rink on Friday 4 November 2011. Although this tournament was held in 2011 it was part of the speed skating season 2011–2012. There were 22 participants.

== Statistics ==
=== Result ===
Position	Skater	Time
1st place, gold medalist(s)	Jorrit Bergsma	6:17.83 PR
2nd place, silver medalist(s)	Bob de Jong	6:18.72
3rd place, bronze medalist(s)	Sven Kramer	6:19.35
4	Jan Blokhuijsen	6:20.67
5	Douwe de Vries	6:21.29 PR
6	Wouter Olde Heuvel	6:23.88
7	Ted-Jan Bloemen	6:24.47
8	Rob Hadders	6:24.64 PR
9	Bob de Vries	6:27.35
10	Koen Verweij	6:27.42
11	Mark Ooijevaar	6:29.09
12	Frank Vreugdenhil	6:30.49
13	Arjen van der Kieft	6:33.01
14	Arjan Stroetinga	6:36.106
15	Crispijn Ariëns	6:36.109 PR
16	Renz Rotteveel	6:36.53
17	Jos de Vos	6:36.70 PR
18	Christijn Groeneveld	6:37.41
19	Maurice Vriend	6:38.53
20	Karlo Timmerman	6:39.48 PR
21	Willem Hut	6:42.19
22	Robert Bovenhuis	6:43.14

=== Draw ===
Heat	Inside lane	Outside lane
1	Rob Hadders	Mark Ooijevaar
2	Willem Hut	Crispijn Ariëns
3	Maurice Vriend	Jos de Vos
4	Frank Vreugdenhil	Karlo Timmerman
5	Christijn Groeneveld	Arjan Stroetinga
6	Ted-Jan Bloemen	Koen Verweij
7	Arjen van der Kieft	Douwe de Vries
8	Renz Rotteveel	Sven Kramer
9	Jorrit Bergsma	Robert Bovenhuis
10	Jan Blokhuijsen	Bob de Vries
11	Bob de Jong	Wouter Olde Heuvel
