= 2013 KNSB Dutch Single Distance Championships – Men's 5000 m =

Dutch speed skating competition

- Venue: Thialf, Heerenveen
- Dates: 9 November 2012
- Competitors: 20 skaters

Medalist men
1st place, gold medalist(s)		Sven Kramer	NED
2nd place, silver medalist(s)		Jan Blokhuijsen	NED
3rd place, bronze medalist(s)		Jorrit Bergsma	NED

The men's 5000 meter at the 2013 KNSB Dutch Single Distance Championships took place in Heerenveen at the Thialf ice skating rink on Friday 9 November 2012. Although this tournament was held in 2012 it was part of the speed skating season 2012–2013.There were 20 participants.

== Statistics ==
=== Result ===
Position	Skater	Time
1st place, gold medalist(s)	Sven Kramer	6:17.46
2nd place, silver medalist(s)	Jan Blokhuijsen	6:20.34
3rd place, bronze medalist(s)	Jorrit Bergsma	6:20.46
4	Bob de Jong	6:20.97
5	Ted-Jan Bloemen	6:22.42
6	Robert Bovenhuis	6:26.11
7	Douwe de Vries	6:26.19
8	Rob Hadders	6:27.30
9	Koen Verweij	6:27.50
10	Frank Vreugdenhil	6:27.71
11	Renz Rotteveel	6:29.68
12	Mark Ooijevaar	6:30.59
13	Maurice Vriend	6:31.08 PR
14	Christijn Groeneveld	6:31.21
15	Arjan Stroetinga	6:31.63
16	Arjen van der Kieft	6:31.82
17	Crispijn Ariëns	6:34.41
18	Pim Cazemier	6:35.73 PR
19	Frank Hermans	6:39.42
20	Bob de Vries	6:45.15

=== Draw ===
Heat	Inside lane	Outside lane
1	Frank Hermans	Frank Vreugdenhil
2	Robert Bovenhuis	Arjen van der Kieft
3	Pim Cazemier	Arjan Stroetinga
4	Maurice Vriend	Crispijn Ariëns
5	Mark Ooijevaar	Christijn Groeneveld
6	Bob de Vries	Renz Rotteveel
7	Ted-Jan Bloemen	Douwe de Vries
8	Koen Verweij	Rob Hadders
9	Bob de Jong	Jorrit Bergsma
10	Sven Kramer	Jan Blokhuijsen
