= 2010 KNSB Dutch Allround Championships =

- Venue: Thialf, Heerenveen
- Dates: 6 and 7 March 2010
- Competitors: 46

Medalist men
| 1st place, gold medalist(s) | | Wouter olde Heuvel | NED |
| 2nd place, silver medalist(s) | | Ted-Jan Bloemen | NED |
| 3rd place, bronze medalist(s) | | Koen Verweij | NED |

Medalist women
| 1st place, gold medalist(s) | | Elma de Vries | NED |
| 2nd place, silver medalist(s) | | Jorien Voorhuis | NED |
| 3rd place, bronze medalist(s) | | Marrit Leenstra | NED |

The 2010 KNSB Dutch Allround Championships in speed skating were held at the Thialf ice stadium in Heerenveen, Netherlands on 6 and 7 March 2010. The championships were part of the 2009-2010 speed skating season.

The men's and women's winners, Wouter olde Heuvel and Elma de Vries qualified for the 2010 World Allround Speed Skating Championships. Title holders Sven Kramer and Ireen Wüst didn't compete in the championships. They were already selected to compete at the World Allround Championships, besides of Jan Blokhuijsen and Diane Valkenburg, who also didn't compete at the Dutch Allround Championships. Topsportcommissie Langebaan selected the final two athletes for the World Allround Championships, after the Dutch Allround Championships.

== Schedule ==
Schedule
| Date | Distances |
| Saturday; 6 March 2010 | Women's 500 meter Men's 500 meter Women's 3000 meter Men's 5000 meter |
| Sunday; 7 March 2010 | Women's 1500 meter Men's 1500 meter Women's 5000 meter Men's 10,000 meter |

== Medalists ==
=== Allround ===
| Distance | Gold | | Silver | | Bronze | |
|---|---|---|---|---|---|---|
| Men's allround | Wouter olde Heuvel | 152.191 | Ted-Jan Bloemen | 152.285 | Koen Verweij | 153.285 |
| Women's allround | Elma de Vries | 167.441 | Jorien Voorhuis | 167.476 | Marrit Leenstra | 169.662 |

=== Distance ===
| Distance | Gold | | Silver | | Bronze | |
|---|---|---|---|---|---|---|
| Men's 500 m | Remco olde Heuvel | 35.97 | Robbert de Rijk | 36.89 | Koen Verweij | 36.95 |
| Men's 1500 m | Remco olde Heuvel | 1:48.11 | Wouter olde Heuvel | 1:48.58 | Ben Jongejan | 1:48.78 |
| Men's 5000 m | Ted-Jan Bloemen | 6:25.23 | Arjen van der Kieft | 6:26.27 | Wouter olde Heuvel | 6:27.08 |
| Men's 10000 m | Wouter olde Heuvel | 13:21.18 | Wouter olde Heuvel | 13:24.21 | Bob de Jong | 13:32.15 |
| Women's 500 m | Ingeborg Kroon | 40.16 | Rosa Pater | 40.19 | Anice Das | 40.27 |
| Women's 1500 m | Marrit Leenstra | 2:01.55 | Elma de Vries | 2:01.56 | Jorien Voorhuis | 2:01.92 |
| Women's 3000 m | Jorien Voorhuis | 4:12.69 | Elma de Vries | 4:15.34 | Janneke Ensing | 4:15.39 |
| Women's 5000 m | Elma de Vries | 7:20.55 | Jorien Voorhuis | 7:20.61 | Marije Joling | 7:28.71 |

== Men's results ==
=== 500m ===
| Place | Athlete | Time | Dif. |
|---|---|---|---|
| 1 | Remco olde Heuvel | 35.97 |
| 2 | Robbert de Rijk | 36.89 | + 0.92 |
| 3 | Koen Verweij | 36.95 | + 0.98 |
| 4 | Tim Roelofsen | 37.02 | + 1.05 |
| 5 | Bram Smallenbroek | 37.04 | + 1.07 |
| 6 | Wouter olde Heuvel | 37.08 | + 1.11 |
| 7 | Rienk Nauta | 37.09 | + 1.12 |
| 8 | Ted-Jan Bloemen | 37.17 | + 1.20 |
| 9 | Ben Jongejan | 37.18 | + 1.21 |
| 10 | Michael Heemskerk | 37.24 | + 1.27 |
| 11 | Bart van den Berg | 37.41 | + 1.44 |
| 12 | Renz Rotteveel | 37.44 | + 1.47 |
| 13 | Joep Pennartz | 37.53 | + 1.56 |
| 14 | Adriaan van Velde | 37.54 | + 1.57 |
| 15 | Rigard van Klooster | 37.58 | + 1.61 |
| 16 | Bernd Zweden | 37.62 | + 1.65 |
| 17 | Bart van Wanrooy | 37.68 | + 1.71 |
| 18 | Ralph de Haan | 38.20 | + 2.23 |
| 19 | Marco Bos | 38.46 | + 2.49 |
| 20 | Boris Kusmirak | 38.63 | + 2.66 |
| 21 | Bob de Jong | 38.94 | + 2.97 |
| 22 | Mark Ooijevaar | 39.47 | + 3.50 |
| 23 | Arjen van der Kieft | 39.54 | + 3.57 |
| | Tom Schuit | DQ |

=== 5000m ===
| Place | Athlete | Time | Dif. |
|---|---|---|---|
| 1 | Ted-Jan Bloemen | 6:25.23 |
| 2 | Arjen van der Kieft | 6:26.27 | + 1.04 |
| 3 | Wouter olde Heuvel | 6:27.08 | + 1.85 |
| 4 | Tim Roelofsen | 6:28.81 | + 3.58 |
| 5 | Bob de Jong | 6:29.92 | + 4.69 |
| 6 | Koen Verweij | 6:30.37 | + 5.14 |
| 7 | Ben Jongejan | 6:33.11 | + 7.88 |
| 8 | Mark Ooijevaar | 6:35.18 | + 9.95 |
| 9 | Boris Kusmirak | 6:37.43 | + 12.20 |
| 10 | Ralph de Haan | 6:38.67 | + 13.44 |
| 11 | Renz Rotteveel | 6:39.31 | + 14.08 |
| 12 | Robbert de Rijk | 6:39.41 | + 14.18 |
| 13 | Bart van den Berg | 6:41.05 | + 15.82 |
| 14 | Tom Schuit | 6:45.81 | + 20.58 |
| 15 | Rigard van Klooster | 6:47.47 | + 22.24 |
| 16 | Marco Bos | 6:48.83 | + 23.60 |
| 17 | Michael Heemskerk | 6:49.14 | + 23.91 |
| 18 | Adriaan van Velde | 6:51.52 | + 26.29 |
| 19 | Bram Smallenbroek | 6:52.36 | + 27.13 |
| 20 | Remco olde Heuvel | 6:53.44 | + 28.21 |
| 21 | Rienk Nauta | 6:55.44 | + 30.21 |
| 22 | Bart van Wanrooy | 6:58.56 | + 33.33 |
| 23 | Joep Pennartz | 6:58.90 | + 33.67 |
| 24 | Bernd Zweden | 7:03.56 | + 38.33 |

=== 1500m ===
| Place | Athlete | Time | Dif. |
|---|---|---|---|
| 1 | Remco olde Heuvel | 1:48.11 |
| 2 | Wouter olde Heuvel | 1:48.58 | + 0.47 |
| 3 | Ben Jongejan | 1:48.78 | + 0.67 |
| 4 | Koen Verweij | 1:48.84 | + 0.73 |
| 5 | Tim Roelofsen | 1:49.10 | + 0.99 |
| 6 | Ted-Jan Bloemen | 1:49.60 | + 1.49 |
| 7 | Renz Rotteveel | 1:49.63 | + 1.52 |
| 8 | Bram Smallenbroek | 1:49.97 | + 1.86 |
| 9 | Bart van den Berg | 1:50.26 | + 2.15 |
| 10 | Robbert de Rijk | 1:50.43 | + 2.32 |
| 11 | Boris Kusmirak | 1:50.70 | + 2.59 |
| 12 | Michael Heemskerk | 1:50.96 | + 2.85 |
| 13 | Ralph de Haan | 1:51.10 | + 2.99 |
| 14 | Joep Pennartz | 1:51.23 | + 3.12 |
| 15 | Rigard van Klooster | 1:51.76 | + 3.65 |
| 16 | Bob de Jong | 1:51.79 | + 3.68 |
| 17 | Rienk Nauta | 1:52.13 | + 4.02 |
| 18 | Arjen van der Kieft | 1:52.71 | + 4.60 |
| 19 | Marco Bos | 1:53.06 | + 4.95 |
| 20 | Bart van Wanrooy | 1:53.11 | + 5.00 |
| 21 | Adriaan van Velde | 1:53.26 | + 5.15 |
| 22 | Bernd Zweden | 1:53.34 | + 5.23 |
| 23 | Mark Ooijevaar | 1:53.41 | + 5.30 |
| | Tom Schuit | DNS |

=== 10000m ===
| Place | Athlete | Time | Dif. |
|---|---|---|---|
| 1 | Ted-Jan Bloemen | 13:21.18 |
| 2 | Wouter olde Heuvel | 13:24.21 | + 3.03 |
| 3 | Bob de Jong | 13:32.15 | + 10.97 |
| 4 | Mark Ooijevaar | 13:37.73 | + 16.55 |
| 5 | Koen Verweij | 13:40.37 | + 19.19 |
| 6 | Tim Roelofsen | 13:41.03 | + 19.85 |
| 7 | Arjen van der Kieft | 13:45.85 | + 24.67 |
| 8 | Ben Jongejan | 13:50.39 | + 29.21 |
| 9 | Renz Rotteveel | 13:52.34 | + 31.16 |
| 10 | Robbert de Rijk | 14:00.49 | + 39.31 |
| 11 | Ralph de Haan | 14:05.06 | + 43.88 |
| 12 | Bart van den Berg | 14:06.38 | + 45.20 |

=== Final results ===
| Place | Athlete | Country | 500m | 5000m | 1500m | 10,000m | Points |
|---|---|---|---|---|---|---|---|
| 1st place, gold medalist(s) | Wouter olde Heuvel | Netherlands | 37.08 (6) | 6:27.08 (3) | 1:48.58 (2) | 13:24.21 (2) | 152.191 |
| 2nd place, silver medalist(s) | Ted-Jan Bloemen | Netherlands | 37.17 (8) | 6:25.23 (1) | 1:49.60 (6) | 13:21.18 (1) | 152.285 |
| 3rd place, bronze medalist(s) | Koen Verweij | Netherlands | 36.95 (3) | 6:30.37 (6) | 1:48.84 (4) | 13:40.37 (5) | 153.285 |
| 4 | Tim Roelofsen | Netherlands | 37.02 (4) | 6:28.81 (4) | 1:49.10 (5) | 13:41.03 (6) pr | 153.318 |
| 5 | Ben Jongejan | Netherlands | 37.18 (9) | 6:33.11 (7) | 1:48.78 (3) | 13:50.39 (8) | 154.270 |
| 6 | Renz Rotteveel | Netherlands | 37.44 (12) | 6:39.31 (11) | 1:49.63 (7) | 13:52.34 (9) | 155.531 |
| 7 | Robbert de Rijk | Netherlands | 36.89 (2) | 6:39.41 (12) | 1:50.43 (10) | 14:00.49 (10) pr | 155.665 |
| 8 | Bob de Jong | Netherlands | 38.94 (21) | 6:29.92 (5) | 1:51.79 (16) | 13:32.15 (3) | 155.802 |
| 9 | Bart van den Berg | Netherlands | 37.41 (11) pr | 6:41.05 (13) | 1:50.26 (9) pr | 14:06.38 (12) pr | 156.587 |
| 10 | Arjen van der Kieft | Netherlands | 39.54 (23) | 6:26.27 (2) | 1:52.71 (18) | 13:45.85 (7) | 157.029 |
| 11 | Ralph de Haan | Netherlands | 38.20 (18) | 6:38.67 (10) | 1:51.10 (13) | 14:05.06 (11) | 157.353 |
| 12 | Mark Ooijevaar | Netherlands | 39.47 (22) | 6:35.18 (8) | 1:53.41 (23) | 13:37.73 (4) | 157.677 |
| NR13 | Remco olde Heuvel | Netherlands | 35.97 (1) | 6:53.44 (20) | 1:48.11 (1) | | 113.350 |
| NR14 | Bram Smallenbroek | Netherlands | 37.04 (5) | 6:52.36 (19) | 1:49.97 (8) pr | | 114.932 |
| NR15 | Michael Heemskerk | Netherlands | 37.24 (10) pr | 6:49.14 (17) pr | 1:50.96 (12) pr | | 115.140 |
| NR16 | Boris Kusmirak | Netherlands | 38.63 (20) | 6:37.43 (9) | 1:50.70 (11) | | 115.273 |
| NR17 | Rigard van Klooster | Netherlands | 37.58 (15) | 6:47.47 (15) | 1:51.76 (15) | | 115.580 |
| NR18 | Rienk Nauta | Netherlands | 37.09 (7) | 6:55.44 (21) | 1:52.13 (17) | | 116.010 |
| NR19 | Adriaan van Velde | Netherlands | 37.54 (14) pr | 6:51.52 (18) pr | 1:53.26 (21) | | 116.445 |
| NR20 | Joep Pennartz | Netherlands | 37.53 (13) pr | 6:58.90 (23) | 1:51.23 (14) pr | | 116.496 |
| NR21 | Marco Bos | Netherlands | 38.46 (19) | 6:48.83 (16) | 1:53.06 (19) | | 117.029 |
| NR22 | Bart van Wanrooy | Netherlands | 37.68 (17) | 6:58.56 (22) | 1:53.11 (20) pr | | 117.239 |
| NR23 | Bernd Zweden | Netherlands | 37.62 (16) | 7:03.56 (24) | 1:53.34 (22) | | 117.756 |
| DQ1 | Tom Schuit | Netherlands | DQ | 6:45.81 (14) | DNS | | - |

NR = not ranked
DNS = did not start
DQ = disqualified
pr = personal record

Source: Schaatsstatistieken.nl & Schaatsupdate.nl: 500m, 5000m, 1500m, 10,000m,

== Women's results ==
=== 500m ===
| Place | Athlete | Time | Dif. |
|---|---|---|---|
| 1 | Ingeborg Kroon | 40.16 |
| 2 | Rosa Pater | 40.19 | + 0.03 |
| 3 | Anice Das | 40.27 | + 0.11 |
| 4 | Elma de Vries | 40.28 | + 0.12 |
| 5 | Marrit Leenstra | 40.55 | + 0.39 |
| 6 | Maren van Spronsen | 40.65 | + 0.49 |
| 7 | Jorien Voorhuis | 40.66 | + 0.50 |
| 8 | Brecht Kramer | 40.68 | + 0.52 |
| 9 | Linda de Vries | 40.81 | + 0.65 |
| 10 | Marije Joling | 40.89 | + 0.73 |
| 11 | Linda Bouwens | 40.91 | + 0.75 |
| 12 | Yvonne Nauta | 40.97 | + 0.81 |
| 13 | Cindy Vergeer | 40.99 | + 0.83 |
| 14 | Jorieke van der Geest | 41.14 | + 0.98 |
| 15 | Moniek Kleinsman | 41.22 | + 1.06 |
| 16 | Rixt Meijer | 41.23 | + 1.07 |
| 17 | Janneke Ensing | 41.3 | + 1.14 |
| 18 | Manon Kamminga | 41.46 | + 1.30 |
| 19 | Charlotte Bakker | 41.53 | + 1.37 |
| 20 | Carlijn Achtereekte | 41.79 | + 1.63 |
| 21 | Lisanne Soemanta | 42 | + 1.84 |
| 22 | Michelle Bodijn | 42.74 | + 2.58 |

=== 3000m ===
| Place | Athlete | Time | Dif. |
|---|---|---|---|
| 1 | Jorien Voorhuis | 4:12.69 |
| 2 | Elma de Vries | 4:15.34 | + 2.65 |
| 3 | Janneke Ensing | 4:15.39 | + 2.70 |
| 4 | Marrit Leenstra | 4:16.57 | + 3.88 |
| 5 | Yvonne Nauta | 4:17.07 | + 4.38 |
| 6 | Marije Joling | 4:17.71 | + 5.02 |
| 7 | Linda Bouwens | 4:18.81 | + 6.12 |
| 8 | Moniek Kleinsman | 4:19.38 | + 6.69 |
| 9 | Linda de Vries | 4:19.89 | + 7.20 |
| 10 | Ingeborg Kroon | 4:20.88 | + 8.19 |
| 11 | Manon Kamminga | 4:21.33 | + 8.64 |
| 12 | Cindy Vergeer | 4:21.34 | + 8.65 |
| 13 | Jorieke van der Geest | 4:22.02 | + 9.33 |
| 14 | Rixt Meijer | 4:22.32 | + 9.63 |
| 15 | Carlijn Achtereekte | 4:24.19 | + 11.50 |
| 16 | Lisanne Soemanta | 4:24.48 | + 11.79 |
| 17 | Michelle Bodijn | 4:25.36 | + 12.67 |
| 18 | Charlotte Bakker | 4:25.79 | + 13.10 |
| 19 | Maren van Spronsen | 4:29.44 | + 16.75 |
| 20 | Anice Das | 4:29.79 | + 17.10 |
| 21 | Rosa Pater | 4:33.55 | + 20.86 |
| 22 | Brecht Kramer | 4:35.59 | + 22.90s |

=== 1500m ===
| Place | Athlete | Time | Dif. |
|---|---|---|---|
| 1 | Marrit Leenstra | 2:01.55 |
| 2 | Elma de Vries | 2:01.56 | + 0.01 |
| 3 | Jorien Voorhuis | 2:01.92 | + 0.37 |
| 4 | Linda de Vries | 2:02.28 | + 0.73 |
| 5 | Maren van Spronsen | 2:02.69 | + 1.14 |
| 6 | Marije Joling | 2:02.96 | + 1.41 |
| 7 | Janneke Ensing | 2:03.29 | + 1.74 |
| 8 | Anice Das | 2:03.30 | + 1.75 |
| 9 | Linda Bouwens | 2:03.30 | + 1.75 |
| 10 | Ingeborg Kroon | 2:03.38 | + 1.83 |
| 11 | Jorieke van der Geest | 2:03.93 | + 2.38 |
| 12 | Yvonne Nauta | 2:04.03 | + 2.48 |
| 13 | Cindy Vergeer | 2:04.52 | + 2.97 |
| 14 | Charlotte Bakker | 2:04.86 | + 3.31 |
| 15 | Manon Kamminga | 2:05.02 | + 3.47 |
| 16 | Moniek Kleinsman | 2:05.22 | + 3.67 |
| 17 | Rixt Meijer | 2:05.73 | + 4.18 |
| 18 | Rosa Pater | 2:05.83 | + 4.28 |
| 19 | Lisanne Soemanta | 2:05.84 | + 4.29 |
| 20 | Carlijn Achtereekte | 2:06.26 | + 4.71 |
| 21 | Brecht Kramer | 2:06.74 | + 5.19 |
| 22 | Michelle Bodijn | 2:07.10 | + 5.55 |

=== 5000m ===
| Place | Athlete | Time | Dif. |
|---|---|---|---|
| 1 | Elma de Vries | 7:20.55 |
| 2 | Jorien Voorhuis | 7:20.61 | + 0.06 |
| 3 | Marije Joling | 7:28.71 | + 8.16 |
| 4 | Janneke Ensing | 7:29.84 | + 9.29 |
| 5 | Yvonne Nauta | 7:31.47 | + 10.92 |
| 6 | Linda Bouwens | 7:34.84 | + 14.29 |
| 7 | Linda de Vries | 7:37.93 | + 17.38 |
| 8 | Marrit Leenstra | 7:38.35 | + 17.80 |
| 9 | Cindy Vergeer | 7:40.24 | + 19.69 |
| 10 | Ingeborg Kroon | 7:44.30 | + 23.75 |

=== Final results ===
| Place | Athlete | Country | 500m | 3000m | 1500m | 5000m | Points |
|---|---|---|---|---|---|---|---|
| 1st place, gold medalist(s) | Elma de Vries | Netherlands | 40.28 (4) | 4:15.34 (2) | 2:01.56 (2) | 7:20.55 (1) | 167.441 |
| 2nd place, silver medalist(s) | Jorien Voorhuis | Netherlands | 40.66 (7) | 4:12.69 (1) | 2:01.92 (3) | 7:20.61 (2) | 167.476 |
| 3rd place, bronze medalist(s) | Marrit Leenstra | Netherlands | 40.55 (5) | 4:16.57 (4) | 2:01.55 (1) | 7:38.35 (8) | 169.662 |
| 4 | Marije Joling | Netherlands | 40.89 (10) pr | 4:17.71 (6) pr | 2:02.96 (6) | 7:28.71 (3) pr | 169.698 |
| 5 | Janneke Ensing | Netherlands | 41.30 (17) | 4:15.39 (3) | 2:03.29 (7) | 7:29.84 (4) | 169.945 |
| 6 | Yvonne Nauta | Netherlands | 40.97 (12) | 4:17.07 (5) | 2:04.03 (12) | 7:31.47 (5) | 170.305 |
| 7 | Linda Bouwens | Netherlands | 40.91 (11) | 4:18.81 (7) | 2:03.305 (9) | 7:34.84 (6) | 170.629 |
| 8 | Linda de Vries | Netherlands | 40.81 (9) | 4:19.89 (9) | 2:02.28 (4) | 7:37.43 (7) | 170.678 |
| 9 | Ingeborg Kroon | Netherlands | 40.16 (1) | 4:20.88 (10) | 2:03.38 (10) | 7:44.30 (10) | 171.196 |
| 10 | Cindy Vergeer | Netherlands | 40.99 (13) pr | 4:21.34 (12) pr | 2:04.52 (13) | 7:40.24 (9) pr | 172.076 |
| 11 | Jorieke van der Geest | Netherlands | 41.14 (14) | 4:22.02 (13) pr | 2:03.93 (11) | | 126.120 |
| 12 | Moniek Kleinsman | Netherlands | 41.22 (15) | 4:19.38 (8) | 2:05.22 (16) | | 126.190 |
| NR13 | Anice Das | Netherlands | 40.27 (3) | 4:29.79 (20) | 2:30.302 (8) | | 126.335 |
| NR14 | Maren van Spronsen | Netherlands | 40.65 (6) | 4:29.44 (19) | 2:02.69 (5) | | 126.452 |
| NR15 | Manon Kamminga | Netherlands | 41.46 (18) pr | 4:21.33 (11) pr | 2:05.02 (15) pr | | 126.688 |
| NR16 | Rixt Meijer | Netherlands | 41.23 (16) | 4:22.32 (14) | 2:05.73 (17) | | 126.860 |
| NR17 | Charlotte Bakker | Netherlands | 41.53 (19) pr | 4:25.79 (18) pr | 2:04.86 (14) | | 127.448 |
| NR18 | Rosa Pater | Netherlands | 40.19 (2) pr | 4:33.55 (21) pr | 2:05.83 (18) | | 127.724 |
| NR19 | Carlijn Achtereekte | Netherlands | 41.79 (20) | 4:24.19 (15) | 2:06.26 (20) pr | | 127.907 |
| NR20 | Lisanne Soemanta | Netherlands | 42.00 (21) | 4:24.48 (16) | 2:05.84 (19) | | 128.026 |
| NR21 | Brecht Kramer | Netherlands | 40.68 (8) | 4:35.59 (22) | 2:06.74 (21) | | 128.857 |
| NR22 | Michelle Bodijn | Netherlands | 42.74 (22) | 4:25.36 (17) pr | 2:07.10 (22) pr | | 129.332 |

NR = not ranked
DQ = disqualified
pr = personal record

Source: Schaatsstatistieken.nl & Schaatsupdate.nl: 500m, 3000m, 1500m, 5000m
