= 2015 KNSB Dutch Single Distance Championships – Men's 10,000 m =

Dutch speed skating competition

KNSB Dutch Single Distance Championships – Men's 10000 m
- Venue: Thialf, Heerenveen
- Dates: 2 November 2014
- Competitors: 14 skaters

Medalist men
1st place, gold medalist(s)		Jorrit Bergsma	NED
2nd place, silver medalist(s)		Bob de Jong	NED
3rd place, bronze medalist(s)		Erik Jan Kooiman	NED

The men's 10,000 meter at the 2015 KNSB Dutch Single Distance Championships took place in Heerenveen at the Thialf ice skating rink on Sunday 2 November 2014. There were 14 participants.

== Statistics ==
=== Result ===
Position	Skater	Time
1st place, gold medalist(s)	Jorrit Bergsma	12:59.16
2nd place, silver medalist(s)	Bob de Jong	13:08.98
3rd place, bronze medalist(s)	Erik Jan Kooiman	13:09.84 PR
4	Jouke Hoogeveen	13:13.79 PR
5	Wouter olde Heuvel	13:16.24
6	Frank Vreugdenhil	13:18.07 PR
7	Douwe de Vries	13:19.20
8	Bob de Vries	13:19.62
9	Sven Kramer	13:23.74
10	Arjen van der Kieft	13:24.24
11	Simon Schouten	13:29.64 PR
12	Robert Bovenhuis	13:37.13
13	Jos de Vos	13:39.48
NC	Jan Blokhuijsen	DNF

Referee: Jan Bolt. Starter: Janny Smegen
Start: 15:09 hr. Finish: 17:47 hr.

=== Draw ===
Heat	Inside lane	Outside lane
1	Simon Schouten	Wouter olde Heuvel
2	Jouke Hoogeveen	Jos de Vos
3	Erik Jan Kooiman	Frank Vreugdenhil
4	Arjen van der Kieft	Douwe de Vries
5	Bob de Vries	Robert Bovenhuis
6	Jorrit Bergsma	Sven Kramer
7	Jan Blokhuijsen	Bob de Jong
