= 2014 KNSB Dutch Single Distance Championships – Men's 10,000 m =

Dutch speed skating competition

- Venue: Thialf, Heerenveen
- Dates: 27 October 2013
- Competitors: 11

Medalist men
1st place, gold medalist(s)		Sven Kramer	NED
2nd place, silver medalist(s)		Jorrit Bergsma	NED
3rd place, bronze medalist(s)		Bob de Jong	NED

The men's 10,000 meter at the 2014 KNSB Dutch Single Distance Championships took place in Heerenveen at the Thialf ice skating rink on Sunday 27 October 2013. Although this tournament was held in 2013 it was part of the speed skating season 2013–2014. There were 11 participants.

== Statistics ==
=== Result ===
Position	Skater	Time
1st place, gold medalist(s)	Sven Kramer	12:46.96 TR
2nd place, silver medalist(s)	Jorrit Bergsma	12:52.27
3rd place, bronze medalist(s)	Bob de Jong	12:52.30
4	Jan Blokhuijsen	13:00.24
5	Arjen van der Kieft	13:04.04
6	Douwe de Vries	13:09.14
7	Robert Bovenhuis	13:14.71
8	Rob Hadders	13:15.16
9	Bob de Vries	13:15.29
10	Ted-Jan Bloemen	13:32.33
11	Frank Vreugdenhil	13:32.68

=== Draw ===
Heat	Inside lane	Outside lane
1	Frank Vreugdenhil	
2	Douwe de Vries	Robert Bovenhuis
3	Ted-Jan Bloemen	Arjen van der Kieft
4	Bob de Vries	Rob Hadders
5	Bob de Jong	Jan Blokhuijsen
6	Sven Kramer	Jorrit Bergsma
