= 2011 KNSB Dutch Single Distance Championships – Men's 10,000 m =

Dutch speed skating competition

- Venue: Thialf, Heerenveen
- Dates: 7 November 2010
- Competitors: 11

Medalist men
1st place, gold medalist(s)		Bob de Jong	NED
2nd place, silver medalist(s)		Bob de Vries	NED
3rd place, bronze medalist(s)		Jorrit Bergsma	NED

The men's 10,000 meter at the 2011 KNSB Dutch Single Distance Championships took place in Heerenveen at the Thialf ice skating rink on Sunday 7 November 2010. Although this tournament was held in 2010 it was part of the speed skating season 2010–2011. There were 11 participants.

== Statistics ==
=== Result ===
Position	Skater	Time
1st place, gold medalist(s)	Bob de Jong	12:59.95
2nd place, silver medalist(s)	Bob de Vries	13:08.13
3rd place, bronze medalist(s)	Jorrit Bergsma	13:11.54
4	Arjen van der Kieft	13:19.51
5	Ted-Jan Bloemen	13:20.22
6	Robert Bovenhuis	13:20.80
7	Willem Hut	13:23.69 PR
8	Wouter Olde Heuvel	13:28.37
9	Renz Rotteveel	13:49.33
NC	Jan Blokhuijsen	DQ
NC	Mark Ooijevaar	DQ

=== Draw ===
Heat	Inside lane	Outside lane
1	Renz Rotteveel	
2	Robert Bovenhuis	Jorrit Bergsma
3	Mark Ooijevaar	Bob de Vries
4	Jan Blokhuijsen	Willem Hut
5	Ted-Jan Bloemen	Wouter Olde Heuvel
6	Arjen van der Kieft	Bob de Jong
