= 2012 KNSB Dutch Single Distance Championships – Men's 10,000 m =

Dutch speed skating competition

- Venue: Thialf, Heerenveen
- Dates: 6 November 2011
- Competitors: 12

Medalist men
| 1st place, gold medalist(s) | | Bob de Jong | NED |
| 2nd place, silver medalist(s) | | Jorrit Bergsma | NED |
| 3rd place, bronze medalist(s) | | Sven Kramer | NED |

The men's 10,000 meter at the 2012 KNSB Dutch Single Distance Championships took place in Heerenveen at the Thialf ice skating rink on Sunday 6 November 2011. Although this tournament was held in 2011 it was part of the speed skating season 2011–2012. There were 12 participants.

== Statistics ==
=== Result ===
| Position | Skater | Time |
|---|---|---|
| 1st place, gold medalist(s) | Bob de Jong | 12:57.29 |
| 2nd place, silver medalist(s) | Jorrit Bergsma | 13:00.45 PR |
| 3rd place, bronze medalist(s) | Sven Kramer | 13:09.96 |
| 4 | Douwe de Vries | 13:12.03 PR |
| 5 | Jan Blokhuijsen | 13:15.14 |
| 6 | Bob de Vries | 13:15.38 |
| 7 | Rob Hadders | 13:19.91 PR |
| 8 | Wouter Olde Heuvel | 13:21.72 |
| 9 | Arjen van der Kieft | 13:24.97 |
| 10 | Robert Bovenhuis | 13:35.73 |
| 11 | Ted-Jan Bloemen | 13:36.04 |
| 12 | Willem Hut | 13:42.57 |

=== Draw ===
| Heat | Inside lane | Outside lane |
|---|---|---|
| 1 | Jan Blokhuijsen | Rob Hadders |
| 2 | Sven Kramer | Douwe de Vries |
| 3 | Arjen van der Kieft | Robert Bovenhuis |
| 4 | Ted-Jan Bloemen | Willem Hut |
| 5 | Jorrit Bergsma | Bob de Vries |
| 6 | Bob de Jong | Wouter Olde Heuvel |
