= Bob de Jong =

Dutch speed skater (born 1976)

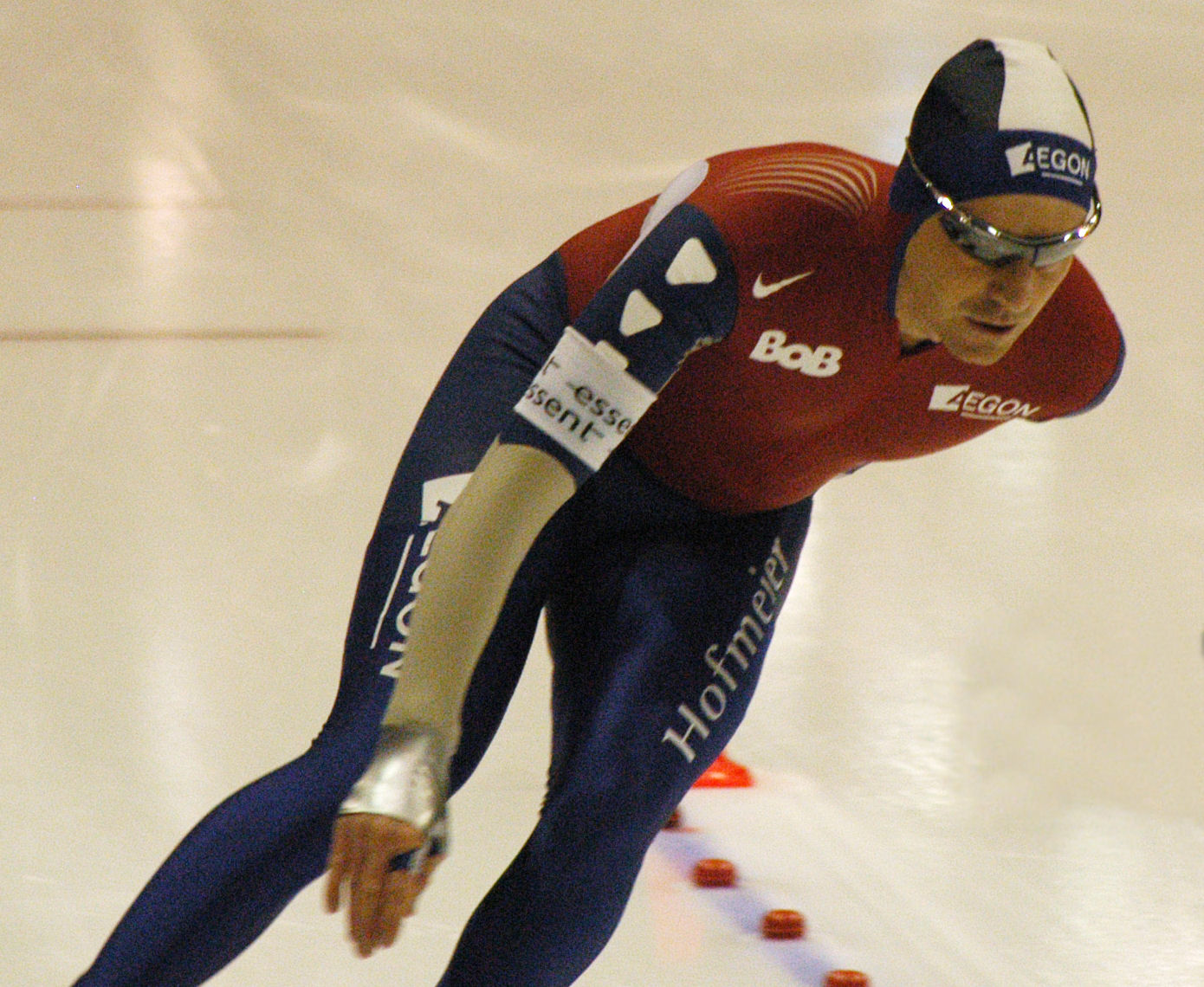
- Bob de Jong in action at a world cup speedskating in Heerenveen, Netherlands

Personal information
- Nationality: Dutch
- Born: 13 November 1976 (age 49) Leimuiden, Netherlands
- Height: 1.81 m (5 ft 11 in)
- Weight: 82 kg (181 lb)
- Website: www.bobdejong.net

Sport
- Country: Netherlands
- Sport: Speed skating
- Retired: 2016

Achievements and titles
- Personal best(s): 500 m: 37.86 (2001); 1000 m: 1:18.74 (1996); 1500 m: 1:48.22 (2005); 3000 m: 3:42.51 (2002); 5000 m: 6:08.76 (2009); 10 000 m: 12:48.20 (2011)
Medal record
Men's speed skating
Representing the Netherlands
Olympic Games
Gold medal – first place	2006 Turin	10000 m
Silver medal – second place	1998 Nagano	10000 m
Bronze medal – third place	2010 Vancouver	10000 m
Bronze medal – third place	2014 Sochi	10000 m
World Single Distance Championships
Gold medal – first place	1999 Heerenveen	10000 m
Gold medal – first place	2001 Salt Lake City	5000 m
Gold medal – first place	2003 Berlin	10000 m
Gold medal – first place	2005 Inzell	10000 m
Gold medal – first place	2011 Inzell	5000 m
Gold medal – first place	2011 Inzell	10000 m
Gold medal – first place	2012 Heerenveen	10000 m
Silver medal – second place	1998 Calgary	10000 m
Silver medal – second place	2000 Nagano	5000 m
Silver medal – second place	2000 Nagano	10000 m
Silver medal – second place	2001 Salt Lake City	10000 m
Silver medal – second place	2003 Berlin	5000 m
Silver medal – second place	2004 Seoul	10000 m
Silver medal – second place	2005 Inzell	5000 m
Silver medal – second place	2012 Heerenveen	5000 m
Bronze medal – third place	1997 Warszawa	10000 m
Bronze medal – third place	1999 Heerenveen	5000 m
Bronze medal – third place	2008 Nagano	10000 m
Bronze medal – third place	2009 Vancouver	10000 m
Bronze medal – third place	2013 Sochi	10000 m
World Junior Championships
Gold medal – first place	1995 Seinäjoki	Allround
Gold medal – first place	1996 Calgary	Allround

Bob Johannes Carolus de Jong (born 13 November 1976) is a Dutch former speed skater who specialized in long distances: five and ten kilometers.

== Speed skating career ==
In 2006, he won the gold medal for the ten kilometer race at the Olympic Games in Turin, with a personal record of 13:01.57, beating world record holder Chad Hedrick and Carl Verheijen. He also skated in the men's 5000 m event and placed 6th. In 1998, he won the silver medal in the men's 10,000 m and 4th in the men's 5000 m. At the 2002 Winter Olympics in Salt Lake City, Utah, he placed 15th in the men's 10,000 m and 30th in the men's 5000 m.

In 2010, he won the bronze medal in the men's 10,000 m. and in his fifth Olympics in 2014 he took his second Olympic Bronze in 10,000 m event.

After winning a bronze medal in the 10,000 m at the 2010 Olympic Games, de Jong, at age 37, won another bronze medal at the 2014 Olympic Games in Sochi in the 10,000 m becoming the oldest male competitor in 86 years to win speed skating medal at the Olympics.

== Records ==
=== Personal records ===
Personal records
Men's speed skating
Event	Result	Date	Location	Notes
500 meter	37.86	15 March 2001	Calgary	
1000 meter	1:18.74	28 January 1996	Collalbo	
1500 meter	1:48.22	17 March 2001	Calgary	
3000 meter	3.41.89	3 November 2013	Calgary	
5000 meter	6:07.43	17 November 2013	Salt Lake City	
10000 meter	12:48.20	12 March 2011	Inzell	
Big combination	153.859	6 February 2005	Moscow	

Source: SpeedskatingResults.com

De Jong has a score of 149.086 on the adelskalender. His highest ranking was 4th between 17 March 2001 and 20 October 2001.

=== World records ===
Event	Result	Date	Location	Notes
3000 meter	3:53.06	8 March 1996	Calgary	Junior world record until 19 March 1999
5000 meter	6:37.55	10 March 1996	Calgary	Junior world record until 20 March 1999
3000 meter	3:53.06	8 March 1996	Calgary	World record until 25 February 1998

=== World records skated at sea level venues (unofficial) ===
Event	Result	Date	Location	Notes
3000 meter	3:52.14	27 October 2001	Berlin	World record until 16 November 2002
5000 meter	6:19.94	9 November 2003	Hamar	World record until 14 November 2004

== Tournament overview ==
Season	Dutch Championships Single Distances	Dutch Championships Allround	World Championships Single Distances	World Championships Allround	Olympic Games	World Championships Junior Allround	World Cup
1994–95	THE HAGUE 11th 1500m 4th 5000m (bronze) 10000m					SEINÄJOKI 35th 500m (gold) 3000m (bronze) 1500m (gold) 5000m (gold) overall	
1995–96	GRONINGEN 7th 1500m (silver) 5000m (gold) 10000m	THE HAGUE 17th 500m (silver) 5000m 9th 1500m (gold) 5000m 5th overall				CALGARY 29th 500m (gold) 3000m 10th 1500m (gold) 5000m (gold) overall	
1996–97		ASSEN 24th 500m 4th 5000m 19th 1500m 4th 10000m 10th overall	WARSAW (bronze) 10000m				(bronze) 5000/10000m
1997–98	HEERENVEEN 15th 1500m (bronze) 5000m (gold) 10000m		CALGARY 5th 5000m (silver) 10000m		NAGANO 4th 5000m (silver) 10000m		(bronze) 5000/10000m
1998–99	GRONINGEN 6th 5000m (gold) 10000m	THE HAGUE 19th 500m (gold) 5000m 13th 1500m (gold) 10000m (bronze) overall	HEERENVEEN (bronze) 5000m (gold) 10000m				(silver) 5000/10000m
1999–2000	DEVENTER (gold) 5000m (silver) 10000m		NAGANO (silver) 5000m (silver) 10000m				(silver) 5000/10000m
2000–01	THE HAGUE (bronze) 5000m (silver) 10000m	HEERENVEEN 16th 500m (gold) 5000m 13th 1500m 4th 10000m 8th overall	SALT LAKE CITY (gold) 5000m (silver) 10000m				(bronze) 5000/10000m
2001–02	GRONINGEN 14th 1500m (silver) 5000m				SALT LAKE CITY 30th 5000m 15th 10000m		(silver) 5000/10000m
2002–03	UTRECHT 10th 1500m 5th 5000m (silver) 10000m	ASSEN 22nd 500m (silver) 5000m 14th 1500m (gold) 10000m 7th overall	BERLIN (silver) 5000m (gold) 10000m				
2003–04	HEERENVEEN 10th 1500m (bronze) 5000m (bronze) 10000m	EINDHOVEN 17th 500m (silver) 5000m 15th 1500m (bronze) 10000m 8th overall	SEOUL 6th 5000m (silver) 10000m				
2004–05	ASSEN 22nd 1500m (gold) 5000m (gold) 10000m	HEERENVEEN 24th 500m 4th 5000m 9th 1500m (gold) 10000m 12th overall	INZELL (silver) 5000m (gold) 10000m	MOSCOW 16th 500m (bronze) 5000m 10th 1500m 7th 10000m 7th overall			(silver) 5000/10000m
2005–06	HEERENVEEN 23rd 1500m (bronze) 5000m (bronze) 10000m	UTRECHT 22nd 500m (gold) 5000m 9th 1500m (gold) 10000m (bronze) overall		CALGARY 22nd 500m 15th 5000m 23rd 1500m DNQ 10000m 22nd overall	TURIN 6th 5000m (gold) 10000m		7th 5000/10000m
2006–07	ASSEN (bronze) 5000m (bronze) 10000m	HEERENVEEN 24th 500m 4th 5000m 16th 1500m (bronze) 10000m 10th overall					5th 5000/10000m
2007–08	HEERENVEEN 5th 5000m (silver) 10000m	GRONINGEN 22nd 500m 8th 5000m 21st 1500m 4th 10000m 11th overall	NAGANO (bronze) 10000m				4th 5000/10000m
2008–09	HEERENVEEN 4th 5000m (bronze) 10000m	HEERENVEEN 24th 500m (bronze) 5000m 19th 1500m (silver) 10000m 7th overall	VANCOUVER 5th 5000m (bronze) 10000m				(bronze) 5000/10000m
2009–10	HEERENVEEN (silver) 5000m (silver) 10000m	HEERENVEEN 21st 500m 5th 5000m 16th 1500m (bronze) 10000m 8th overall			VANCOUVER 5th 5000m (bronze) 10000m		(bronze) 5000/10000m
2010–11	HEERENVEEN DQ 5000m (gold) 10000m		INZELL (gold) 5000m (gold) 10000m				(gold) 5000/10000m
2011–12	HEERENVEEN (silver) 5000m (gold) 10000m		HEERENVEEN (silver) 5000m (gold) 10000m				(gold) 5000/10000m
2012–13	HEERENVEEN 4th 5000m (silver) 10000m	HEERENVEEN 22nd 500m (bronze) 5000m 13th 1500m (gold) 10000m 5th overall	SOCHI 5th 5000m (bronze) 10000m				(silver) 5000/10000m
2013–14	HEERENVEEN (bronze) 5000m (bronze) 10000m	HEERENVEEN WD 500m WD 5000m WD 1500m WD 10000m NC overall			SOCHI (bronze) 10000m		9th 5000/10000m
2014–15	HEERENVEEN 5th 5000m (silver) 10000m	HEERENVEEN 23rd 500m DQ 5000m 24th 1500m DNQ 10000m NC overall					(bronze) 5000/10000m
2015–16	HEERENVEEN 10th 5000m DQ 10000m						30th 5000/10000m

WD = withdrew
NC = no classification
DQ = disqualified
DNS = did not start

== World Cup ==
Season	5000 meter/10000 meter					
1996–1997	8th	8th*	3rd place, bronze medalist(s)	(gold) *	1st place, gold medalist(s)	5th
1997–1998	3rd place, bronze medalist(s)	2nd place, silver medalist(s)	5th	9th*	2nd place, silver medalist(s)	8h
1998–1999	10th	4th*	2nd place, silver medalist(s)	6th	2nd place, silver medalist(s)	
1999–2000	3rd place, bronze medalist(s)	(silver) *	3rd place, bronze medalist(s)	1st place, gold medalist(s)	2nd place, silver medalist(s)	
2000–2001	7th	(silver) *	2nd place, silver medalist(s)	4th	2nd place, silver medalist(s)	
2001–2002	2nd place, silver medalist(s)	2nd place, silver medalist(s)	4th	5th*	3rd place, bronze medalist(s)	11th
2002–2003	2nd place, silver medalist(s)	2nd place, silver medalist(s)	2nd place, silver medalist(s)	(bronze) *	2nd place, silver medalist(s)	2nd place, silver medalist(s)
2003–2004	1st place, gold medalist(s)	1st place, gold medalist(s)	(gold) *	6th	3rd place, bronze medalist(s)	(gold) *
2004–2005	3rd place, bronze medalist(s)	4th	4th*	3rd place, bronze medalist(s)	1st place, gold medalist(s)	(gold) *
2005–2006	4th	6th	9th*	9th	–	
2006–2007	5th	5th	4th*	11th	6th	8th
2007–2008	10th	4th	(bronze) *	5th	(bronze) *	19th
2008–2009	4th	5th	(gold) *	3rd place, bronze medalist(s)	(bronze) *	5th
2009–2010	3rd place, bronze medalist(s)	2nd place, silver medalist(s)	(silver) *	3rd place, bronze medalist(s)	2nd place, silver medalist(s)	8th
2010–2011	1st place, gold medalist(s)	4th	(gold) *	1st place, gold medalist(s)	(gold) *	1st place, gold medalist(s)
2011–2012	3rd place, bronze medalist(s)	7th	(silver) *	1st place, gold medalist(s)	(gold) *	2nd place, silver medalist(s)
2012–2013	4th	4th	(silver) *	2nd place, silver medalist(s)	(gold) *	
2013–2014	3rd place, bronze medalist(s)	2nd place, silver medalist(s)	–	11th	5th	–
2014–2015	4th	(gold) *	4th	4th	11th	6th
2015–2016	–	–	10th	–	–	–

- * = 10000 meter

== Medals won ==
Championship	Gold (gold)	Silver (silver)	Bronze (bronze)
Dutch Single Distances	8	11	12
Dutch Allround	0	0	2
World Single Distances	7	8	5
World Allround	0	0	0
Olympic Games	1	1	2

Awards
Preceded by Erben Wennemars; Sven Kramer	Ard Schenk Award; 2006; 2011	Succeeded by Sven Kramer; Stefan Groothuis
Preceded by (Czech Republic) Martina Sáblíková	Oscar Mathisen Award; 2011	Succeeded by (Canada) Christine Nesbitt
