= Wouter olde Heuvel =

Dutch former speed skater (born 1986)

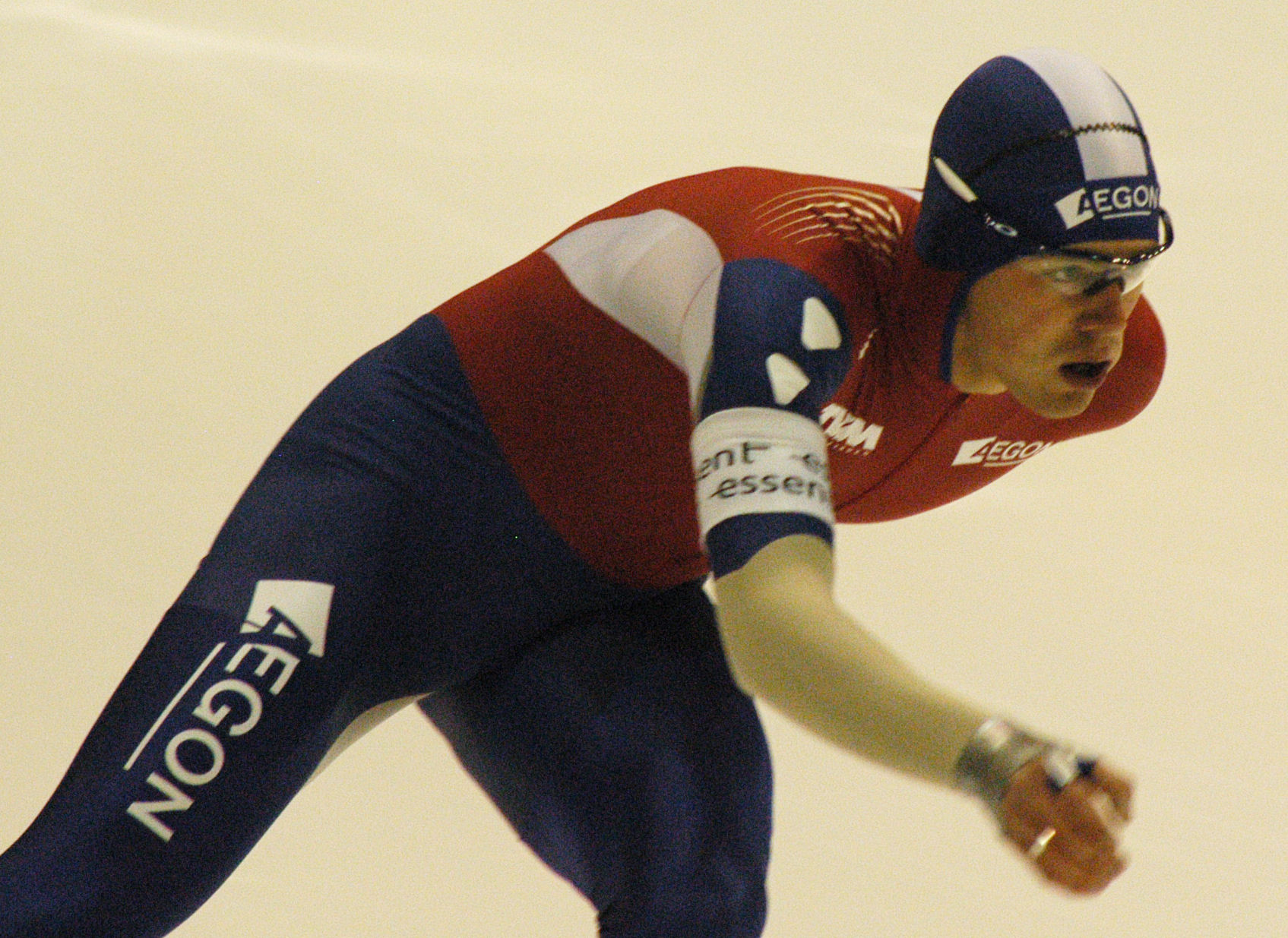
- Wouter olde Heuvel

Personal information
- Born: 18 August 1986 (age 39) Losser, Netherlands

Sport
- Country: Netherlands
- Sport: Speed skating
- Retired: 2016
Medal record
Men's speed skating
Representing the Netherlands
World Championships
Gold medal – first place	2008 Nagano	Team pursuit
Gold medal – first place	2009 Vancouver	Team pursuit
Bronze medal – third place	2008 Nagano	5000 m
European Championships
Bronze medal – third place	2009 Heerenveen	Allround
World Junior Championships
Silver medal – second place	2005 Seinäjoki	Allround
Silver medal – second place	2006 Erfurt	Allround

Wouter olde Heuvel (born 18 August 1986) is a Dutch former speed skater who participated in international competitions. His older brother Remco is also a speed skater.

== Records ==
=== Personal records ===
Personal records
Men's speed skating
Event	Result	Date	Location	Notes
500 meter	36.17	10 March 2013	Calgary	
1000 meter	1:09.63	10 March 2013	Calgary	
1500 meter	1:44.24	13 February 2011	Calgary	
3000 meter	3:39.36	26 November 2011	Nur-Sultan	
5000 meter	6:16.26	17 November 2007	Calgary	
10000 meter	13:14.79	29 December 2010	Heerenveen	

Olde Heuvel has a score of 148.281 points on the Adelskalendern.

=== World records ===
Nr.	Event	Result	Date	Location	Notes
1.	3000 meter	3:45.87	20 March 2003	Calgary	Junior world record
2.	3000 meter	3:44.72	10 March 2005	Calgary	Junior world record
3.	Small combination	150.454	22 March 2002	Calgary	Junior world record
4.	Small combination	149.481	23 March 2003	Calgary	Junior world record
5.	Small combination	148.614	11 March 2005	Calgary	Junior world record
6.	Team pursuit	*3:57.30	4 December 2005	Collalbo	Junior world record
7.	Team pursuit	**3:56.27	12 March 2006	Erfurt	Junior world record

* together with Ted-Jan Bloemen and Ralph de Haan
** together with Ted-Jan Bloemen and Boris Kusmirak

=== World records at a sea-level ice rink (non-official) ===
Nr.	Event	Result	Date	Location	Notes
1.	3000 meter	3:39.36	26 November 2011	Nur-Sultan	

== Tournament overview ==
Season	Dutch Championships Single Distances	Dutch Championships Allround	European Championships Allround	World Championships Allround	World Championships Single Distances	World Cup GWC	World Championships Junior Allround
2004–05		HEERENVEEN 17th 500m 14th 5000m 15th 1500m DNQ 10000m 15th overall					SEINÄJOKI 11th 500m (silver) 3000m 4th 1500m (silver) 5000m (silver) overall (gold) team pursuit
2005–06	HEERENVEEN 21st 1500m 9th 5000m 9th 10000m	UTRECHT 6th 500m 5th 5000m 19th 1500m DNQ 10000m 14th overall		CALGARY 12th 500m 13th 5000m 15th 1500m DNQ 10000m 15th overall			ERFURT 14th 500m (silver) 3000m 5th 1500m (silver) 5000m (silver) overall (gold) team pursuit
2006–07		HEERENVEEN 10th 500m (bronze) 5000m 7th 1500m 4th 10000m 5th overall	COLLALBO 14th 500m 6th 5000m 11th 1500m 10th 10000m 10th overall	HEERENVEEN 14th 500m 5th 5000m 12th 1500m 6th 10000m 7th overall	SALT LAKE CITY 7th 5000m	23rd 5000/10000m (gold) team pursuit	
2007–08	HEERENVEEN (bronze) 5000m 7th 10000m	GRONINGEN 5th 500m (silver) 5000m (silver) 1500m 5th 10000m (silver) overall	KOLOMNA 6th 500m (bronze) 5000m 5th 1500m 4th 10000m 4th overall	BERLIN 12th 500m 5th 5000m 6th 1500m (bronze) 10000m 5th overall	NAGANO (bronze) 5000m (gold) team pursuit	32nd 1500m 5th 5000/10000m (gold) team pursuit	
2008–09	HEERENVEEN (bronze) 5000m	HEERENVEEN 12th 500m (silver) 5000m 5th 1500m 4th 10000m (silver) overall	HEERENVEEN 8th 500m (bronze) 5000m 4th 1500m 4th 10000m (bronze) overall	HAMAR 11th 500m 4th 5000m 7th 1500m 4th 10000m 4th overall	VANCOUVER (gold) team pursuit	15th 1500m 9th 5000/10000m	
2009–10	HEERENVEEN (bronze) 5000m 5th 10000m	HEERENVEEN 6th 500m (bronze) 5000m (silver) 1500m (silver) 10000m (gold) overall	HAMAR 11th 500m 8th 5000m 4th 1500m 7th 10000m 6th overall	HEERENVEEN 15th 500m 8th 5000m 8th 1500m 8th 10000m 7th overall		7th 5000/10000m	
2010–11	HEERENVEEN 4th 1500m (silver) 5000m 8th 10000m	HEERENVEEN 5th 500m (gold) 5000m (gold) 1500m (gold) 10000m (gold) overall	COLLALBO 9th 500m (bronze) 5000m (bronze) 1500m (silver) 10000m 4th overall	CALGARY 12th 500m 6th 5000m 8th 1500m 7th 10000m 8th overall	INZELL 7th 5000m	12th 1500m 6th 5000/10000m 8th team pursuit	
2011–12	HEERENVEEN 4th 1500m 6th 5000m 10th 10000m					12th 1500m (gold) team pursuit	
2012–13							
2013–14	HEERENVEEN 13th 1000m 5th 1500m	AMSTERDAM (bronze) 500m 5th 5000m 4th 1500m 5th 10000m (bronze) overall		HEERENVEEN 5th 500m 8th 5000m 14th 1500m DNQ 10000m 10th overall		31st 1500m	
2014–15	HEERENVEEN 5th 1500m (bronze) 5000m 5th 10000m	HEERENVEEN 6th 500m (bronze) 5000m (gold) 1500m (bronze) 10000m (silver) overall	CHELYABINSK 8th 500m (silver) 5000m 9th 1500m 6th 10000m 6th overall			4th 1500m 8th 5000/10000m (silver) team pursuit	
2015–16						37th 1500m 38th 5000m	

== World Cup overview ==
Season	1500 meter						
2006–07							
2007–08	–	–	–	–	1st(b)	–	–
2008–09	–	–	–	1st(b)	7th	8th	
2009–10							
2010–11	6th	13th	–	6th	9th		
2011–12	8th	1st place, gold medalist(s)	11th	–	–	–	
2012–13							
2013–14	13th(b)	–	4th(b)	4th(b)	–	–	
2014–15	2nd place, silver medalist(s)	2nd place, silver medalist(s)	–	2nd place, silver medalist(s)	12th	7th	
2015–16	17th	1st(b)	–	–	–	–	

Season	5000/10000 meter						
2006–07	–	–	–*	1st(b)	–*	7th	
2007–08	6th	7th	–*	4th	–*	–	3rd place, bronze medalist(s)
2008–09	7th	8th	–*	4th	–*	9th	
2009–10	5th	5th	7th*	8th	–	5th	
2010–11	3rd place, bronze medalist(s)	5th	–*	5th	6th*	7th	
2011–12							
2012–13							
2013–14							
2014–15	3rd place, bronze medalist(s)	–*	–	3rd place, bronze medalist(s)	7th	5th	
2015–16	14th	–	–	–	–	–	

Season	Team pursuit			
2006–07	–	–	1st place, gold medalist(s)	
2007–08	–	1st place, gold medalist(s)	–	1st place, gold medalist(s)
2008–09				
2009–10				
2010–11	3rd place, bronze medalist(s)	–	DQ	
2011–12	1st place, gold medalist(s)	1st place, gold medalist(s)	–	–
2012–13				
2013–14				
2014–15	1st place, gold medalist(s)	–	–	
2015–16				

– = geen deelname
(b) = Division B
* = 10000 meter

== Medals won ==
Championship	Gold (gold)	Silver (silver)	Bronze (bronze)
Dutch Single Distances	0	1	4
Dutch Allround classification	2	3	1
Dutch Allround single events	4	5	5
European Allround classification	0	0	1
European Allround single events	0	2	4
World Allround classification	0	0	0
World Allround single events	0	0	1
World Single Distances	2	0	1
World Cup 1500m	1	3	0
World Cup 5000m	0	0	4
World Cup Team pursuit	6	0	1
World Cup classification	3	1	0
World Junior Allround classification	0	2	0
World Junior Allround single distances	2	0	0

== Career highlights ==
World Allround Championships
2006 - Calgary, 15th
2007 - Heerenveen, 7th
2008 - Berlin, 5th
2009 - Hamar, 4th
2010 - Heerenveen, 7th
2011 - Calgary, 8th
European Championships
2007 - Collalbo, 10th
2008 - Kolomna, 4th
2009 - Heerenveen, (bronze) 3rd
2010 - Hamar, 6th
2011 - Collalbo, 4th
National Allround Championships
2007 - Heerenveen, 5th
2008 - Groningen, (silver)
2009 - Heerenveen, (silver)
2010 - Heerenveen, (gold)
2011 - Heerenveen, (gold)
World Junior Allround Championships
2005 - Seinäjoki, (silver) 2nd
2006 - Erfurt, (silver) 2nd
European Junior Games
2005 - Moscow, (bronze) 3rd at 1500 m
2005 - Moscow, (gold) 1st at 5000 m
2006 - Collalbo, (gold) 1st at 1500 m
2006 - Collalbo, (bronze) 3rd at 5000 m
World Single Distance Championships
2008 - Nagano, (bronze) 3rd at 5000 m
2008 - Nagano, (gold) 1st at team pursuit
2009 - Vancouver, (gold) 1st at team pursuit
2011 - Inzell, 7th 5000 m

Source: www.sskating.com
