= Douwe de Vries =

Dutch speed skater

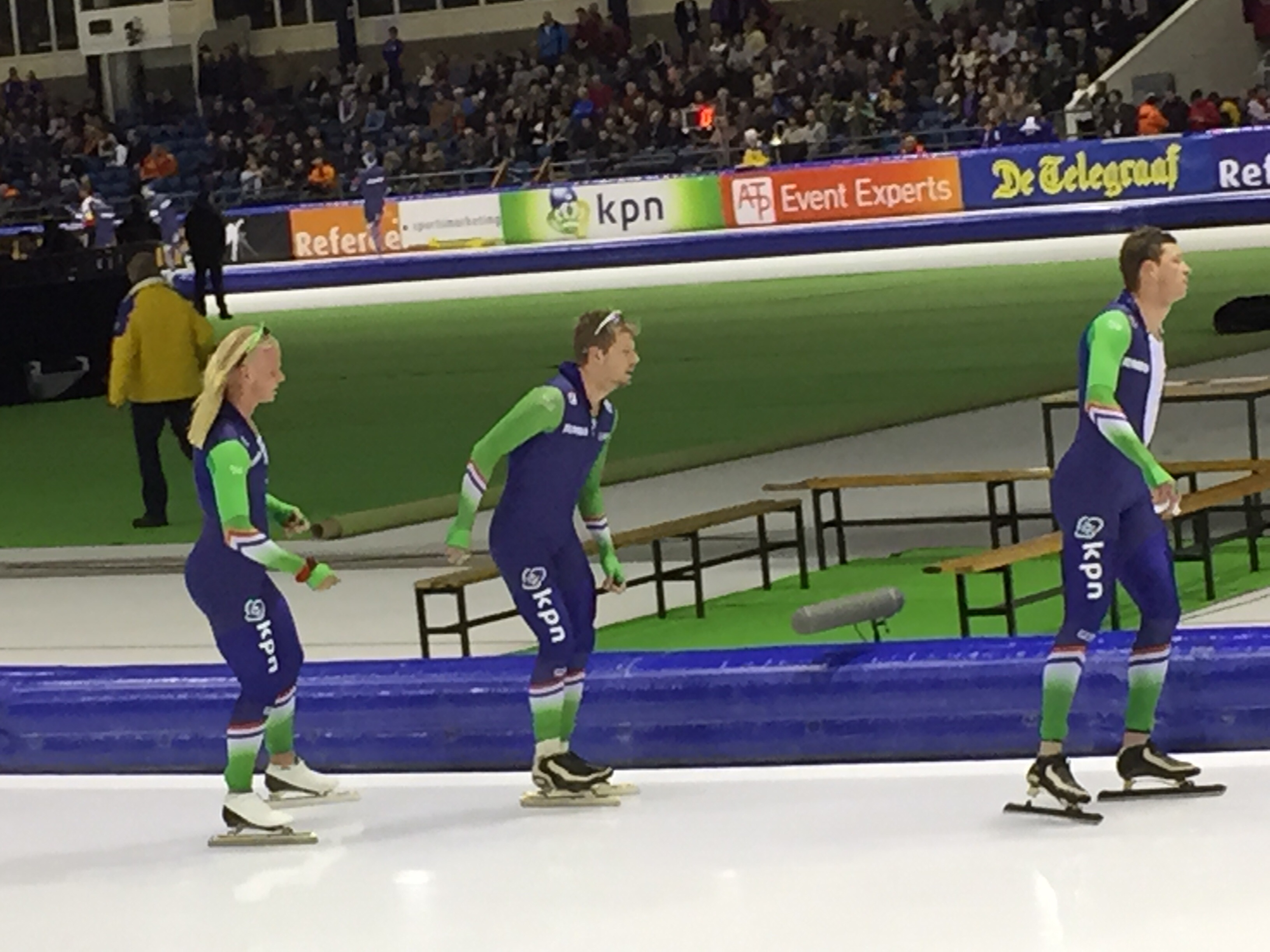
- De Vries (centre) in 2015

Personal information
- Nationality: Dutch
- Born: 14 June 1982 (age 44) Hallum, Netherlands
- Height: 1.80 m (5 ft 11 in)
- Weight: 75 kg (165 lb)

Sport
- Country: Netherlands
- Sport: Speed skating
- Event: 5000 m
- Club: STG Stiens
- Turned pro: 2007
- Coached by: Jac Orie
Medal record
World Single Distances Championships
Gold medal – first place	2015 Heerenveen	Team pursuit
Gold medal – first place	2016 Kolomna	Team pursuit
Gold medal – first place	2017 Gangneung	Team pursuit
Gold medal – first place	2019 Inzell	Team pursuit
Gold medal – first place	2020 Salt Lake City	Team pursuit
Bronze medal – third place	2015 Heerenveen	5000 m

Douwe de Vries (born 14 June 1982) is a Dutch former professional marathon speed skater and long track speed skater. He resides in Heerenveen, Friesland. Douwe de Vries, who was a member of the commercial team of LottoNL-Jumbo, is the current holder (with Sven Kramer and Marcel Bosker) of the team pursuit world record.

== Career ==
In 2007, Douwe de Vries won the Willem Poelstra Trophy for the greatest talent in marathon skating.

On 6 December 2014, he finished third at the 2014–15 ISU Speed Skating World Cup – World Cup 3 – Men's 5000 metres.

In 2015 and 2016, he won the gold medal in the team pursuit event at the World Single Distance Championships.

In March 2015, Douwe de Vries improved the world hour record, set by Casper Helling on 15 March 2007 at 41,969.10 m, bringing it to 42,252.22 m.

He has a score of 146.604 points on the adelskalender.

== Records ==
=== Personal records ===
Personal records
Speed skating
Event	Result	Date	Location	Notes
500 m	36.46	2 March 2019	Olympic Oval, Calgary	
1000 m	1:10.45	28 February 2015	Olympic Oval, Calgary	
1500 m	1:43.63	7 February 2020	Olympic Oval, Calgary	
3000 m	3:39.46	6 March 2013	Olympic Oval, Calgary	
5000 m	6:08.46	8 February 2020	Olympic Oval, Calgary	Quartet start
10000 m	12:55.10	27 January 2019	Thialf, Heerenveen	

=== World records ===
World records
Speed skating
Event	Result	Date	Location	Notes
Team pursuit	3:34.68	16 February 2020	Utah Olympic Oval, Salt Lake City	Current world record (with Sven Kramer and Marcel Bosker).
1 hour	42,252,22 m	13 March 2015	Olympic Oval, Calgary	World record (unofficial) until beaten by Erik Jan Kooiman on 9 December 2015.

== Tournament overview ==
Season	Dutch Championships Single Distances	Dutch Championships Allround	European Championships Allround	World Championships Allround	World Championships Single Distances	World Cup
2002–03	UTRECHT 20th 1000m	ASSEN 18th 500m 18th 5000m 18th 1500m DNQ 10000m 19th overall				
2003–04	HEERENVEEN 26th 1000m 24th 1500m 18th 5000m	EINDHOVEN 18th 500m 23rd 5000m 17th 1500m DNQ 10000m NC overall(23)				
2004–05	ASSEN 30th 1500m 18th 5000m					
2011–12	HEERENVEEN 5th 5000m 4th 10000m					8th 5000m/10000m
2012–13	HEERENVEEN 7th 5000m 8th 10000m	HEERENVEEN 14th 500m 6th 5000m 12th 1500m DNQ 10000m 12th overall				
2013–14	HEERENVEEN 11th 1500m 6th 5000m 6th 10000m	AMSTERDAM 9th 500m DQ 5000m 7th 1500m DNQ 10000m NC overall	HAMAR 20th 500m (silver) 5000m 10th 1500m 7th 10000m 7th overall			40th 1500m 6th 5000m/10000m (gold) team pursuit
2014–15	HEERENVEEN 9th 1500m 4th 5000m 7th 10000m	HEERENVEEN 11th 500m 4th 5000m 6th 1500m 4th 10000m 5th overall		CALGARY 20th 500m 7th 5000m 14th 1500m 6th 10000m 6th overall	HEERENVEEN (bronze) 5000m (gold) team pursuit	33rd 1500m 7th 5000m/10000m (silver) team pursuit
2015–16	HEERENVEEN 10th 1500m (bronze) 5000m 7th 10000m	HEERENVEEN 7th 500m (silver) 5000m (bronze) 1500m (bronze) 10000m (silver) overall	MINSK 19th 500m 13th 5000m DNS 1500m DNQ 10000m NC overall		HEERENVEEN 9th 5000m (gold) team pursuit	40th 1500m 7th 5000m/10000m (gold) team pursuit
2016–17	HEERENVEEN 11th 1500m (bronze) 5000m		HEERENVEEN 16th 500m 6th 5000m 11th 1500m 4th 10000m 5th overall		KOLOMNA 4th 5000m (gold) team pursuit	22nd 1500m 6th 5000m/10000m
2017–18	HEERENVEEN 7th 5000m 8th 10000m					
2018–19	HEERENVEEN 5th 1500m 4th 5000m (bronze) 10000m (gold) Mass start	HEERENVEEN 8th 500m (gold) 5000m (gold) 1500m (gold) 10000m (gold) overall	COLLALBO 11th 500m 7th 5000m 8th 1500m (bronze) 10000m 7th overall	CALGARY 10th 500m 4th 5000m 5th 1500m 5th 10000m 4th overall	INZELL 14th Mass start (gold) team pursuit	32nd 1500m 15th 1500m 4th team pursuit
2019–20	HEERENVEEN 8th 1500m 5th 5000m	HEERENVEEN 9th 500m (bronze) 5000m (silver) 1500m (gold) 10000m (bronze) overall			SALT LAKE CITY (gold) team pursuit	31st 1500m 21st 5000m (silver) team pursuit

DQ = Disqualified
NC = No classification
DNQ = Did not qualify for the final distance
DNS =Did not start

== World Cup overview ==
Season	1500meter					
2011–12						
2012–13						
2013–14	–	–	5th(b)	–	–	
2014–15	–	–	–	–	2nd(b)	–
2015–16	–	–	–	–	6th(b)	
2016–17	2nd(b)	14th	–	–	18th	–
2017–18						
2018–19	14th	16th	–	–	–	
2019–20	–	2nd(b)	–	3rd(b)	–	

Season	5000meter/10000meter									
2011–12	10th	9th	5th*	–	4th*	6th				
2012–13										
2013–14	–	2nd(b)	1st(b)	5th	4th	5th	–	–	1st place, gold medalist(s)	1st place, gold medalist(s)
2014–15	7th	6th*	3rd place, bronze medalist(s)	10th	2nd place, silver medalist(s)	8th	1st place, gold medalist(s)	3rd place, bronze medalist(s)	2nd place, silver medalist(s)	
2015–16	6th	–*	4th	6th	7th	DNF	1st place, gold medalist(s)	–	1st place, gold medalist(s)	
2016–17	6th	3rd place, bronze medalist(s)	–	5th*	4th	8th				
2017–18										
2018–19	8th	15th	–	12th	8th					
2019–20	2nd(b)	9th	–	–	1st(b)	–				

Season	Team pursuit				
2011–12					
2012–13					
2013–14	–	–	1st place, gold medalist(s)	1st place, gold medalist(s)	
2014–15	1st place, gold medalist(s)	3rd place, bronze medalist(s)	2nd place, silver medalist(s)		
2015–16	DNF	1st place, gold medalist(s)	–	1st place, gold medalist(s)	
2016–17	1st place, gold medalist(s)	1st place, gold medalist(s)	–	2nd place, silver medalist(s)	1st place, gold medalist(s)
2017–18					
2018–19	2nd place, silver medalist(s)	1st place, gold medalist(s)	–		
2019–20	1st place, gold medalist(s)	–	–		

– = Did not participate
DNF = Did not finish
(b) = Division B
* = 10000 meter

== Medals won ==
Championship	Gold (gold)	Silver (silver)	Bronze (bronze)
Dutch Single Distances	1	0	3
Dutch Allround	5	3	4
European Allround	0	1	1
World Allround	5	0	1
World Cup	17	6	4
World Single Distances	5	0	1

Records
Preceded by (Netherlands) Jan Blokhuijsen, Koen Verweij, Sven Kramer	Men's team pursuit speed skating world record 6 December 2009 – present with Sven Kramer and Marcel Bosker	Succeeded by Current holders
Preceded by (Netherlands) Casper Helling	Men's 1 hour speed skating world record (unofficial); 13 March 2015 – 9 December 2015	Succeeded by (Netherlands) Erik Jan Kooiman
