= Bart van den Berg =

Dutch tennis player

- Country (sports): Netherlands
- Born: 25 July 1993 (age 31); Krimpen aan den IJssel
- Prize money: $15,901

Singles
- Career record: 0–0
- Career titles: 0
- Highest ranking: 927 ATP

Doubles
- Career record: 0–1
- Career titles: 1 ITF
- Highest ranking: 831 ATP
- Last updated on: 23 december 2023.

Bart van den Berg (born 25 July 1993) is a Dutch tennis player.

van den Berg made his ATP main draw debut at the 2016 ABN AMRO World Tennis Tournament in the doubles draw partnering Jesse Huta Galung.
