= Moniek Kleinsman =

Dutch speed skater

Personal information
- Born: 3 November 1982 (age 44) Bentelo, Netherlands

Sport
- Country: Netherlands
- Sport: Speed skating
Medal record
Women's speed skating
Representing the Netherlands
Winter Universiade
Bronze medal – third place	2007 Turin	1500 m
Silver medal – second place	2007 Turin	5000 m
Gold medal – first place	2007 Turin	Team pursuit

Moniek Kleinsman (born 3 November 1982) is a Dutch speed skater who was born in Bentelo, Overijssel, and currently resides in Wolvega. She competed at the 2006 Winter Olympics.

Kleinsman got her first speed skating lessons at the age of four. A few years later, when she was getting more serious into the sport she was mainly focussing on short track speed skating, just like her brother. However, at the age of twelve she decided to concentrate on long track speed skating instead.

After competing among the seniors for a few years her breakthrough came in the 2004–05 season, when she won the Dutch national allround championships. That season she appeared on World Cup meets, became 7th at the European allround championships, followed by an eighth position at the World allround championships. Finally, at the KNSB Dutch Single Distance Championships she won two bronze medals over 3000 and 5000 metres.

On 28 December 2005 Kleinsman qualified herself for the 2006 Winter Olympics in Turin at the 3000 metres. It was the third time behind Ireen Wüst and Renate Groenewold. A second try to qualify for the race over 5000 metres fails as she became fourth, however she skated a personal best time that day.

Prior to the 2006 Winter Olympics Kleinsman became under pressure by the Dutch media as it was unsure whether 2002 Winter Olympics silver medalist Gretha Smit could participate at the Olympic 5000 metres race. Smit finished third at the Dutch qualifying competition where only the first and second rider automatically qualified. The third spot had to be won during the Olympic 3000 metres race. To accomplish this three Dutch riders had to finish among the first 16 riders on the distance. Ireen Wüst and Renate Groenewold were expected to do this and indeed reached their goal with Wüst even winning the gold medal. Kleinsman was expected to reach the first 16 as well, but there were some doubts by analysts and the pressure on Kleinsman rose.

In the end Kleinsman under performed in her race, finishing in 17th position behind Anna Rokita who skated almost a second faster. As a result, Smit was unable to start at the 5000 metres and Kleinsman got under fire by the media again. Her reaction was that she felt sorry for Smit, but that it was not her problem. She did all she could, but was unable to skate faster. She said people should not blame her, if Smit wanted to race in Turin she had to skate faster at the qualifying tournament. Later during the Games she also skated in the pursuit team, where Smit also participated in. Kleinsman was unable to follow the team as soon as the half way mark was passed and the other members had to slow their speed. In the elimination rounds the Dutch faced high favourites Germany and were eliminated.

Unless her words the pressure remained and she had a hard time during her preparations for the next season. She was unable to get back to her good form she constantly had before the Turin incident and did not qualify for any of the major tournaments in the season like the World Cups, continental and world championships. However, besides her speed skating she still studies nursing in Enschede and therefore was eligible to qualify for the 2007 Winter Universiade, which were also held in Turin.

Kleinsman succeeded in the qualification program and was determined for another chance in Turin and to close the subject that resulted in her bad period. At the 1500 metres she did well among the top skaters and finished in a third position, which was good for a bronze medal. She also won a silver medal over 5000 metres and a gold in the team pursuit alongside Janneke Ensing and Diane Valkenburg.

== Championships ==
National Allround Championships
2010 – Heerenveen, 12th
