= Jorien Voorhuis =

Dutch speed skater

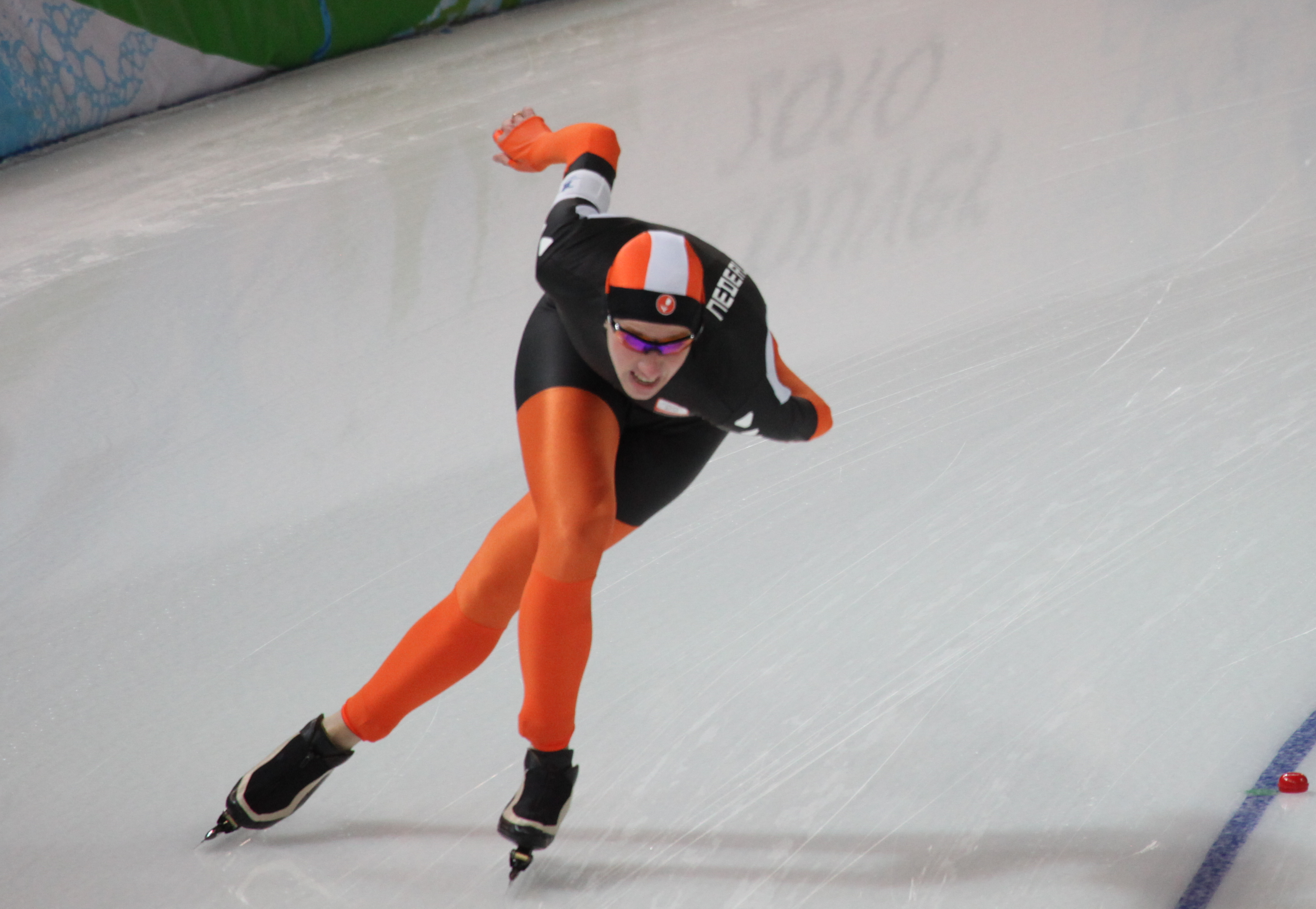
- Voorhuis in 2010

Personal information
- Born: August 26, 1984 (age 41) Hengelo, Netherlands
- Website: www.jorienvoorhuis.nl

Sport
- Country: Netherlands
- Sport: Speed skating
Medal record
Speed skating
Representing Netherlands
World Championships
Silver medal – second place	2009 Vancouver	Team pursuit
Bronze medal – third place	2011 Inzell	1500 m
World Junior Championships
Gold medal – first place	2003 Kushiro	Teampursuit
Gold medal – first place	2004 Roseville	Teampursuit
Dutch Allround Championships
Bronze medal – third place	2006 Heerenveen	Allround
Silver medal – second place	2010 Heerenveen	Allround
Silver medal – second place	2011 Heerenveen	Allround

Jorien Voorhuis (born 26 August 1984 in Hengelo) is a Dutch speedskater. Until season 2009/2012 she skated with the VPZ-team. Before season 2010/2011 Voorhuis changed to TVM. Her favorite distances are 1500 and 3000 meters.

== Skating career ==
=== Early career ===
Her international breakthrough happened when she reached the 7th place at the Junior World Championships speedskating 2003 at Kushiro (Japan). She got a 2nd place on the 1500 meters. A year later she became 8th at the Junior World championships speedskating 2004. In 2005, she won 3 medals, including a golden medal on the 5000 meters at the Winteruniversiade. At the Dutch championships allround 2006 in Utrecht she won the bronze medal.

=== Season 2007/08 ===
For the first runs at the World Cup she only qualified for the 5000 meters. During the Dutch championships sprint 2008 in Thialf (Heerenveen) she won the bronze medal on the 1000 meters. In the final placing she was 6th. Even though this was not enough for a spot in the World Championships sprint, it did get her a ticket to the World Cup for the 1000 meters.

During the Worldcup in Baselga, Voorhuis was the only Dutch competitor and came in 4th on the 1500 meters.

At the World Cup final in Thialf (Heerenveen), she qualified for the World Championships long distances 2008 in Nagano. She came in 11th at the 1500 meters there.

=== Season 2008/09 ===
Voorhuis was 6th at the Dutch championships long distances 2009 on the 3000 meters, which wasn't enough to qualify for the World Cups. But right before the first Worldcup match in Berlin, Lisette van der Geest broke her collarbone, which caused Jorien Voorhuis to take her place. In the meantime, she rose to the 35th place in the Adelskalendern.

In the Dutch championships allround 2009 she was 4th at the final placing after disqualification of Renate Groenewold. But because Groenewold had a ticket for the European championships, Voorhuis was selected as a reserve for this championship. At January 21, 2009 Voorhuis qualified for the World Championships allround 2009 in Hamar, by a skate-off, along with her teammate Tom Prinsen. She was the 2nd Dutch skater in a 5th place.

=== Season 2009/10 ===
Voorhuis participated on the 1500 (15th) and 3000 meters (10th) at the Dutch championships long distances 2010. At the Dutch championships allround 2010 she came in 2nd, which led to her 7th place at the European championships allround 2010. In February she entered in the 5000 meters at the Olympics and came in 10th. She also took part in the team pursuit.

=== Season 2010/11 ===
At the Dutch championships long distances 2010 Voorhuis skated 3 distances. On the 3000 meters she was 6th, at the 1500 meters she was 5th. But she didn't qualify for the World Cup 2010/2011 because of the protection over Margot Boer. At the 5000 meters it looked like she was going to win, but she was disqualified for crossing the line at the straight side. The KNSB selected her for the World Cup anyway. She also got to skate the 3000 meters, because Marrit Leenstra canceled.

== Personal records ==
Personal records
Speed skating
Event	Result	Date	Location	Notes
500 m	39.16	February 12, 2011	(Canada); Calgary	
1000 m	1:17.24	February 24, 2007	(Canada); Calgary	
1500 m	1:55.20	February 13, 2011	(Canada); Calgary	
3000 m	4:01.75	March 6, 2009	(United States); Salt Lake City	
5000 m	6:59.23	February 13, 2011	(Canada); Calgary	

Source: SpeedskatingResults.com

== Tournament summary ==
year	Dutch Distance	Dutch Sprint	Dutch Allround	European	World Allround	World Distance	Olympics	Worldcup	World Juniors
2003			16th						7th (gold) Team pursuit
2004	16th 1500 m 18e 3000 m								8th (gold) Team pursuit
2005	11th 1000 m 12th 1500 m 10th 3000 m 10th 5000 m		7th						
2006	11th 1500 m 12th 3000 m 9th 5000 m		3rd place, bronze medalist(s)						
2007	7th 1500 m 11th 3000 m 7th 5000 m	7th	6th					32nd 1000 m 14th 1500 m 34th 3k/5k (gold) Team pursuit	
2008	7th 1000 m 6th 1500 m 6th 3000 m 5th 5000 m	8th	6th			11th 1500 m		29th 1000 m 8th 1500 m 21st 3k/5k	
2009	18th 1000 m 6th 1500 m 6th 3000 m 8th 5000 m		4th		5th ⇒	4th 3000 m 10th 5000 m (silver) Team pursuit		20th 1500 m 8th 3k/5k	
2010	15th 1500 m 10th 3000 m		(silver) ⇒	7th ⇒	6th ⇒		10th 5000 m 6th Team pursuit	34th 3k/5k 5th Team pursuit	
2011	5th 1500 m 6th 3000 m DQ 5000 m		(silver) ⇒	5th ⇒	6th ⇒	3rd 1500 m 7th 3000 m 9th 5000m		13th 1500 m 6th 3k/5k (gold) Team pursuit	
2012	9th 1500 m 12th 3000 m 8th 5000 m		3rd place, bronze medalist(s)						

Source: www.sskating.com
