= Janneke Ensing =

Dutch speed skater and cyclist

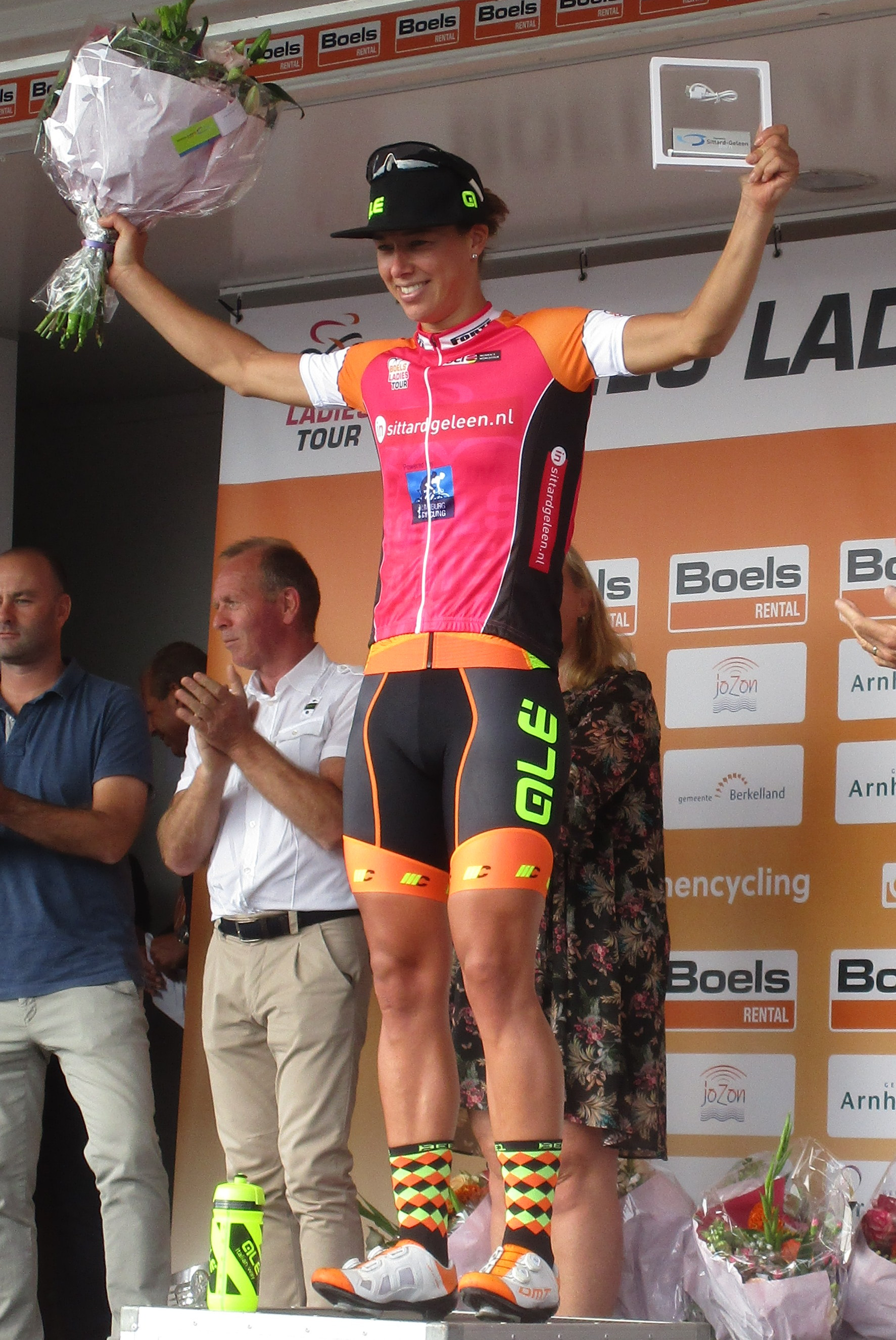
- Ensing at the 2017 Holland Ladies Tour

Personal information
- Full name: Janneke Ensing
- Born: 21 September 1986 (age 40) Gieten, Netherlands

Cycling career
- Sport: Cycling
- Current team: Retired
- Discipline: Road
- Role: Rider

Amateur team
- 2013: Ronald McDonald Huis Groningen

Professional teams
- 2009: Hitec Products UCK
- 2010–2012: Dolmans Landscaping Team
- 2014: Boels–Dolmans
- 2015–2016: Parkhotel Valkenburg Continental Team
- 2017–2018: Alé–Cipollini
- 2019: Team Sunweb
- 2019: WNT–Rotor Pro Cycling
- 2020–2021: Mitchelton–Scott
Medal record
Women's speed skating
Representing the Netherlands
Winter Universiade
| Gold medal – first place | 2007 Turin | Team pursuit |

Janneke Ensing (born 21 September 1986) is a Dutch former sportsperson, who competed in speed skating in the 2000s before becoming a cyclist, competing for seven different teams between 2009 and 2021.

== Career ==
=== Speed skating ===
In 2002, she was the Dutch national C-junior champion. Two years later she won a bronze medal as a B-junior. At the 2007 KNSB Dutch Single Distance Championships Ensing finished 10th over 1500 metres. She also represented her country at the 2007 Winter Universiade held in Turin where she won the gold medal at the team pursuit together with Moniek Kleinsman and Diane Valkenburg. In 2010, Ensing finished fifth in the KNSB Dutch Allround Championships.

=== Cycling ===
Ensing started riding a bicycle in the summer as a means of cross-training before starting to compete in cycle racing. She initially continued speed skating alongside bike racing in order to earn money. During her career, Ensing focused on cycling to a greater extent, resulting in two runner up places at Gent–Wevelgem (2014 and 2015) as well as second in the 2016 Dutch National Road Race Championships and second in the 2017 Santos Women's Tour. She retired from cycling after the delayed 2021 edition of the Ronde van Drenthe, which passed through her hometown of Gieten.

== Major results ==
2007
5th Ronde Rondom de Bult van Usquert
5th Lus van Roden
6th Ronde van Heerenveen
8th Profronde van Surhuisterveen
9th Ronde van Noordhorn
2008
3rd Uithuizen Criterium
6th Ronde van Noordhorn
7th Road race, Noord-Nederland Regional Road Championships
8th Profronde van Surhuisterveen
8th Enschede
2009
1st Road race, Noord-Nederland Regional Road Championships
2nd Gouden Pijl
3rd Profronde van Surhuisterveen
2010
1st Road race, Noord-Nederland Regional Road Championships
1st Profronde van Surhuisterveen
2nd Ronde van Enter
2nd Ronde van Appelscha
2nd Gouden Pijl
3rd Lus van Roden
3rd Wielerronde van Obdam
2011
Noord-Nederland Regional Road Championships

1st Time trial
3rd Road race

1st Ronde van Rijssen
1st Gouden Pijl
2nd Nacht van Hengelo
2nd Ronde van Noordhorn
2nd Wielerronde van Obdam
2nd Dwars door de Westhoek
3rd Ronde van Epe
3rd Profronde van Surhuisterveen
3rd Ridderronde Maastricht
3rd Ronde van Appelscha
2012
1st Ronde van Noordhorn
9th Team time trial, UCI Road World Championships (with Martine Bras, Nina Kessler, Pauliena Rooijakkers, Winanda Spoor & Emma Trott)
2013
3rd Ronde van Haren
3rd Ronde Rondom de Bult van Usquert
2014
2nd Gent–Wevelgem
6th Novilon EDR Cup
2015
2nd Gent–Wevelgem
4th Overall Auensteiner–Radsporttage
5th Omloop van het Hageland
6th Marianne Vos Classic
8th Trofee Maarten Wynants
2016
2nd Road race, National Road Championships
5th Overall La Route de France

1st Mountains classification

2017
1st Mountains classification Ladies Tour of Norway
2nd Overall Santos Women's Tour

1st Mountains classification

4th Overall Giro della Toscana Int. Femminile – Memorial Michela Fanini

1st Stage 1

6th Overall BeNe Ladies Tour
8th Overall Holland Ladies Tour

1st Stage 6

8th Dwars door Vlaanderen
8th La Flèche Wallonne Féminine
9th Le Samyn des Dames
9th Tour of Flanders for Women
2018
1st Le Samyn des Dames
6th Strade Bianche
6th La Classique Morbihan
10th Overall Women's Tour de Yorkshire
2019
2nd Donostia San Sebastian Klasikoa
4th Emakumeen Nafarroako Klasikoa
5th Overall Setmana Ciclista Valenciana
8th Strade Bianche
