= Rixt Meijer =

Dutch former speed skater (born 1982)

Personal information
- Born: 21 February 1982 (age 44) Sneek, Friesland, Netherlands
- Years active: 2002–2015

Sport
- Sport: Long-track speed skating Marathon speed skating
- Events: 1500-metre 3000-metre 5000-metre Mass start
- Coached by: Ron Neymann

Rixt Meijer (born 21 February 1982) is a Dutch former long-track speed skater, marathon speed skater, and cyclist who specialized in all-round speed skating. She trained with the Friesland regional branch of the Royal Dutch Skating Federation (Koninklijke Nederlandsche Schaatsenrijders Bond; KNSB). In 2013, she became the Dutch national champion in marathon speed skating on artificial ice.

== Career ==
Meijer was born in Sneek, but grew up in IJlst. In the winter of 1985, at the age of three, she stepped onto the ice for the first time on a ditch behind her house. That same year, her father took part in the Elfstedentocht, which inspired her to take up ice skating as well. She decided to pursue skating at the age of five. When she was fifteen, she competed in the national championship for young skaters (pupillen), where, to her own surprise, she finished in third place. She was rewarded for this achievement by being selected for the local rink's competitive squad.

She achieved her first top-10 finish at a senior national championship at the 2002 Dutch All-round Championships, where she made her début by placing eighth. She did not improve upon this result until 2011. At the 2010 Dutch Single Distances Championships, she competed in the 1500 metres and 3000 metres, finishing 17th and 16th, respectively.

In 2012, Meijer won silver at the Dutch National Championships on natural ice after winning the sprint from the peloton. In 2013, however, she had to leave the race owing to a broken skate.

On Boxing Day 2012, Meijer became the Dutch national champion in marathon speed skating on artificial ice. She crossed the finish line in second place, but after Lisanne Soemanta fell at the finish and was subsequently disqualified, Meijer was declared the winner. It was her first victory on artificial ice.

At the 2013 Dutch Single Distances Championships, she won bronze in the 5000 metres. This achievement came as a surprise to her and earned her a spot in the World Cup competitions. During her first World Cup race in the 5000 metres, she won the B-group.

In 2014, Meijer was selected for the World Cup mass start events. During the race in Seoul, she helped Irene Schouten in the overall standings. Schouten finished second, while Meijer herself placed fourth, after Martina Sáblíková had broken away.

In 2015, Meijer ended her career, partly due to injury issues. She suffered from a tear in the connective tissue near an intervertebral disc, which made her skating posture difficult and caused her pain. A year and a half later, she made her return to the marathon peloton.

On 21 January 2019, she won the marathon on natural ice in Haaksbergen.

== Personal bests ==
Distance	Time	Date	Track
500 m	40.69	27 December 2010	(Netherlands) Heerenveen
1000 m	1:20.05	1 November 2010	(Netherlands) Heerenveen
1500 m	2:02.24	29 December 2010	(Netherlands) Heerenveen
3000 m	4:09.92	1 November 2014	(Netherlands) Heerenveen
5000 m	7:05.87	2 November 2014	(Netherlands) Heerenveen

== Long-track speed skating results ==
Year	NK distances	NK All-round	NK Sprint	World Cup
2001	14th 3000 m			
2002	18th 500m 11e 1500 m 9e 3000 m 8e 5000 m	8th (12th, 7th, 11th, 7th)		
2003		-	13th (16th, 14th, 15th, 11th)	
2004	15th 3000 m	NC13 (15th, 12th, 17th, -)		
2007	18th 1500 m 14th 3000 m			
2008	23rd 1500 m	NC17 (17th, 14th, 18th, 7th)		
2009		NC17 (21st, 15th, 18th, -)		
2010]]	17th 1500 m 16th 3000 m	NC16 (16th, 14th, 17th, -)		
2011	20th 1000 m 17th 1500 m 15th 3000 m	7th (7th, 13th, 9th, 7th)		
2012	11th 3000 m 6th 5000 m			
2013	8th 3000 m (bronze) 5000 m 11th mass start			22nd 3k/5k 16th mass start
2014	15th 3000 m 6th 5000 m			33rd 3k/5k
2015	10th 3000 m 6th 5000 m			31st 3k/5k 12th mass start 25th Grand Cup
2016	DNS 5000 m			

=== World Cup events ===
Season	3000/5000 m	Mass start
2012/2013	-,-, 1^{B}^{*},-,4^{B}^{*},-	-,-,9th,14th
2013/2014	-,-,4^{B}^{*},-,-,-	
2014/2015	-,2^{B}^{*},-,-,-,-	5th,4th,-,15th,-,-,-

* = 5000 m
- = did not participate
DQ = disqualified
^{B} = B-final

== Marathon speed skating results ==
Year	NK artificial ice	NK natural ice	Open NK natural ice	KNSB Cup standing	Grand Prix standing	Trachitol Trophy	Alternative Elfstedentocht
2012		2nd place, silver medalist(s)	45th	20th	17th		
2013	1st place, gold medalist(s)	withdrew		2nd place, silver medalist(s)	17th		
2014	26th		40th	18th			
2015	32nd			14th			32nd
2016				42nd			
2018	7th			26th			
2019	38th			40th	39th	26th	

=== Results in natural-ice classics ===
Year	Hollands Venetiëtocht	Ronde van Skarsterlân	Veluwemeer- tocht
2012	8th		10th
2013		7th	

=== Medal table ===
Championship	Gold (gold)	Silver (silver)	Bronze (bronze)
NK artificial ice	1	0	0
NK natural ice	0	1	0
KNSB Cup standing	0	1	0

== Cycling results ==
Year	NK road cycling	NK time trial	Dwars door Vlaanderen
2007	33rd	17th	
2008		20th	
2009		17th	
2011	25th	12th	
2012		13th	
2013	DNF	17th	
2014	25th		
2015	28th		
2016	16th		
2017	24th	30th	92nd
2018	DNF		

Sources:

- Profile of Rixt Meijer at Jakub Majerski's Speedskating Database
- Profile of Rixt Meijer at Speedskatingresults.com
- Profile of Rixt Meijer at Schaatspeloton.nl
- Profile of Rixt Meijer at Schaatsstatistieken.nl
- Profile of Rixt Meijer at Isuresults.eu
- Profile of Rixt Meijer at Procyclingstats.com
