= Frank Vreugdenhil =

Canadian gridiron football player (born 2001)

- Vreugdenhil with the Toronto Argonauts in 2026

No. 56 – Toronto Argonauts
- Position: Offensive lineman
- Roster status: Active
- CFL status: National

Personal information
- Born: January 21, 2001 (age 25)
- Listed height: 6 ft 3 in (1.91 m)
- Listed weight: 321 lb (146 kg)

Career information
- High school: Quinte Christian (Belleville, Ontario)
- CJFL: Hamilton Hurricanes
- University: Toronto (2019–2023); McMaster (2024–2025)
- CFL draft: 2026: 5th round, 40th overall pick

Career history
- Toronto Argonauts (2026–present)
- Stats at CFL.ca

Frank Vreugdenhil (born January 21, 2001) is a Canadian professional football offensive lineman for the Toronto Argonauts of the Canadian Football League (CFL). He played U Sports football for the Toronto Varsity Blues and McMaster Marauders.

== Early life ==
Vreugdenhil was born on January 21, 2001. He attended Quinte Christian High School in Belleville, Ontario.

== Junior career ==
In 2023, Vreugdenhil played for the Hamilton Hurricanes of the Canadian Junior Football League (CJFL). He was named an Ontario Conference All-Star.

== University career ==
Vreugdenhil played U Sports football for the Toronto Varsity Blues from 2019 to 2023 and McMaster Marauders from 2024 to 2025. At Toronto, he played on the football team and competed in track and field in the shot put and weight throw. Vreugdenhil earned the 2020 Ontario University Athletics bronze medal in the shot put.

Across two seasons at McMaster, Vreugdenhil played 17 games at right tackle.

== Professional career ==
Pre-draft measurables
Height	Weight	40-yard dash	20-yard shuttle	Three-cone drill	Vertical jump	Broad jump	Bench press
6 ft 2 3/4 in (1.90 m)	321 lb (146 kg)	5.24 s	5.18 s	8.41 s	28 in (0.71 m)	9 ft 0 in (2.74 m)	24 reps
All values from CFL Combine

Vreugdenhil was selected by the Toronto Argonauts with the 40th overall pick in the fifth round of the 2026 CFL draft. On April 30, he officially signed with the team. On May 31, Vreugdenhil was released. On July 13, he was signed to the practice roster. On July 22, Vreugdenhil was elevated to the active roster in a depth role and made his CFL debut on July 25 against the BC Lions.
