= Diane Valkenburg =

Dutch speed skater

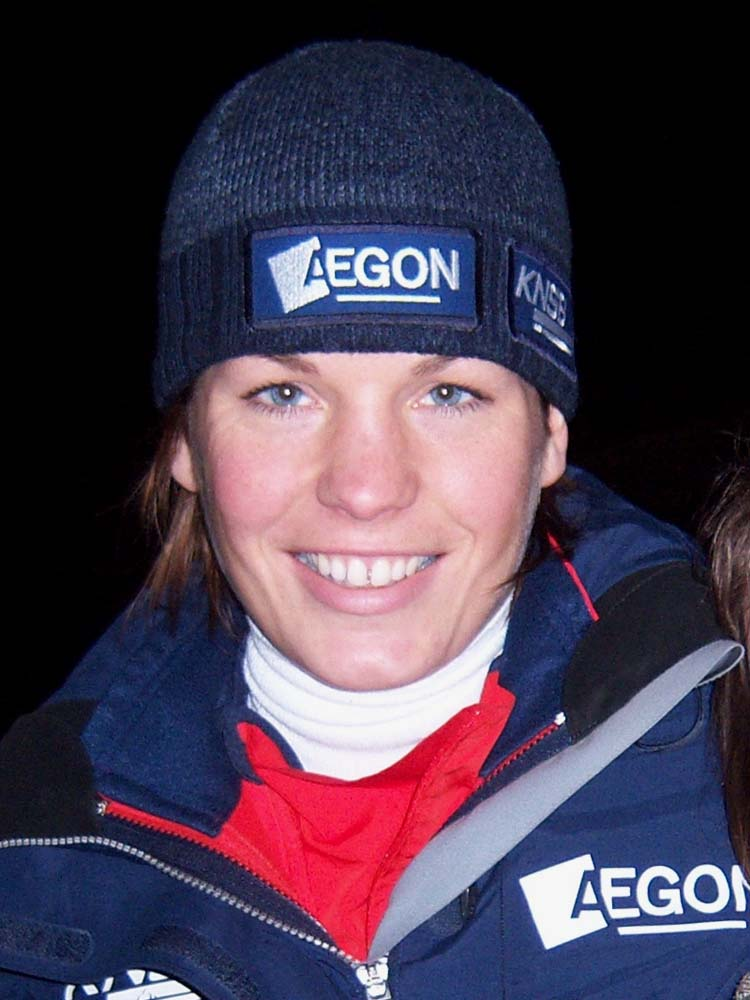
- Diane Valkenburg in 2008

Personal information
- Born: 30 August 1984 (age 41) Bergschenhoek, Netherlands
- Height: 1.72 m (5 ft 7 1/2 in)
- Weight: 66 kg (146 lb)
- Website: www.dianevalkenburg.nl

Sport
- Country: Netherlands
- Sport: Speed skating
- Turned pro: 2006
- Retired: 2016
Medal record
Women's speed skating
Representing the Netherlands
World Championships
Gold medal – first place	2012 Heerenveen	Team pursuit
Silver medal – second place	2011 Inzell	1500 m
Silver medal – second place	2011 Inzell	Team pursuit
World Allround Championships
Silver medal – second place	2013 Hamar	Allround
European Championships
Bronze medal – third place	2013 Heerenveen	Allround
Winter Universiade
Gold medal – first place	2007 Turin	Team pursuit

Diane Valkenburg (born 30 August 1984) is a Dutch former speed skater who specialised in middle distances and was born in Bergschenhoek.

She represented her country at the 2007 Winter Universiade held in Turin where she won the gold medal at the team pursuit together with Moniek Kleinsman and Janneke Ensing.

She participated in the 2010 Winter Olympics on 1500 meters, 3000 meters, and 5000 meters.

== Personal bests ==
Personal records
Speed skating
Event	Result	Date	Location	Notes
100 m	11.76	23 March 2003	The Hague	
300 m	29.29	18 February 2001	The Hague	
500 m	39.48	13 February 2011	Calgary	
1000 m	1:16.95	21 January 2012	Calgary	
1500 m	1:54.44	19 February 2011	Salt Lake City	
3000 m	4:02.44	12 February 2011	Calgary	
5000 m	7:04.10	13 February 2011	Calgary	
Team Pursuit	2:59.70	25 March 2012	Heerenveen	

Source: SpeedskatingResults.com

She is currently in 35th position in the adelskalender.
