= Mark Ooijevaar =

Dutch speed skater

Personal information
- Born: November 9, 1983 (age 42) Hoorn, Netherlands

Sport
- Country: Netherlands
- Sport: Speed skating
Medal record
Men's speed skating
Representing the Netherlands
Winter Universiade
Gold medal – first place	2007 Turin	5000 m
Gold medal – first place	2007 Turin	10000 m

Mark Ooijevaar (born 9 November 1983) is a Dutch speed skater who is specialised in the longer distances, 5000 and 10,000 metres.

Ooijevaar finished 9th at the 10,000 metres of the 2004 Dutch Single Distance Championships in his first senior season. Two years later he reached the 10th position at the 5,000 metres and improved his 10,000 metres result to a 7th place spot. He won the Dutch Allround Championships for students in 2006 and was named in the Dutch national team to represent the country at the 2007 Winter Universiade held in Turin on both the 5000 and 10,000 metres distances.

At the 5000 metres in Turin he accomplished a time of 6:32.71 which turned out to be the fastest race of the day and which was good for a gold medal. Favourite Ivan Skobrev finished in second position on a 2.26 seconds gap, while Andrey Burlyaev won the bronze. Ooijevaar also won the gold medal at the 10000 metres in Turin with a time of 13:28.42.

== Statistics ==
=== World Competitions ===
Distance (meters)	Rank	Time	Event	Place	Country	Season
5000	1	6:49.77	World Cup	Baselga Di Pine	Italy	2008
10000	1	13:12.60	World Cup	Hamar	Norway	2008
10000	5	13:31.34	World Single Distances Championships	Nagano	Japan	2008
10000	1	13:19.26	World Cup	Heerenveen	Netherlands	2009
10000	9	13:25.22	World Cup	Moscow	Russian Federation	2009

=== Dutch Single Distance Championships ===
Distance (meters)	Time	Date	Place	Country	Season
5000	6:31.50	October 31	Heerenveen	Netherlands	2008
10000	13:30.84	November 2	Heerenveen	Netherlands	2008
5000	6:32.65	October 26	Heerenveen	Netherlands	2007
10000	13:46.84	October 28	Heerenveen	Netherlands	2007

=== Dutch Allround Championships ===
Distance (meters)	Time	Date	Place	Country	Season
5000	6:35.18	March 6	Heerenveen	Netherlands	2010
10000	13:37.73	March 7	Heerenveen	Netherlands	2010
5000	6:47.19	December 29	Groningen	Netherlands	2007
