= Arjen van der Kieft =

Dutch speed skater

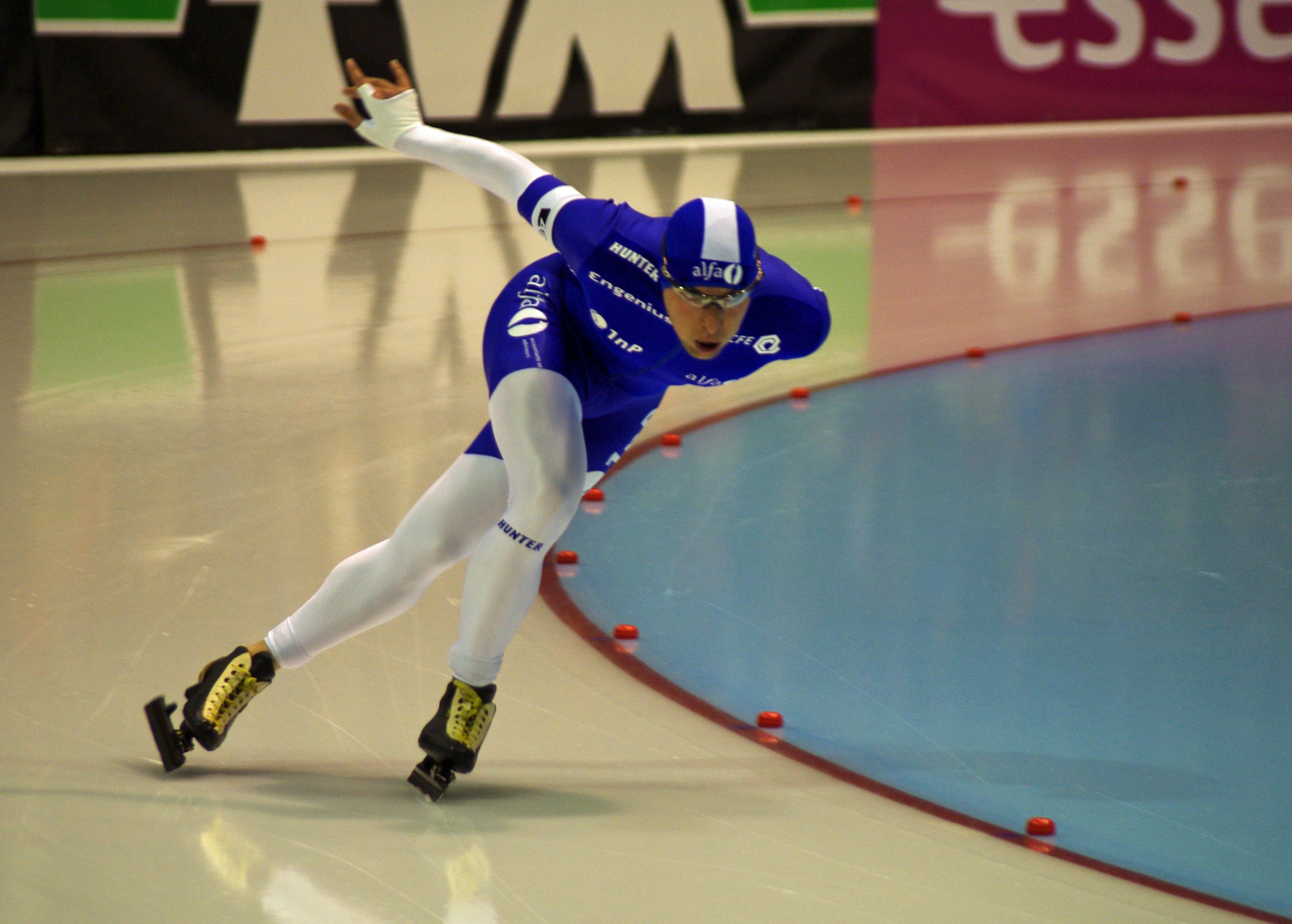

Personal information
- Born: 17 May 1985 (age 41) Zwanenburg, Netherlands
- Website: www.arjenvanderkieft.nl

Sport
- Country: Netherlands
- Sport: Speed skating
- Turned pro: 2004

Arjen van der Kieft (born 17 May 1985) is a Dutch long-distance speed skater. He competed for the Netherlands at the 2010 Winter Olympics in the men's 10000 metres, where he finished 9th.

== Career highlights ==
National Championships
2010 - Heerenveen, 10th allround
