= 2008 KNSB Dutch Allround Championships =

KNSB Dutch Allround Championships
- Venue: Kardinge, Groningen
- Dates: 29 and 30 December 2007

Medalist men
1st place, gold medalist(s)		Sven Kramer (TVM)
2nd place, silver medalist(s)		Wouter olde Heuvel (TVM)
3rd place, bronze medalist(s)		Ben Jongejan (VPZ)

Medalist women
1st place, gold medalist(s)		Ireen Wüst (TVM)
2nd place, silver medalist(s)		Renate Groenewold (TVM)
3rd place, bronze medalist(s)		Paulien van Deutekom (TVM)

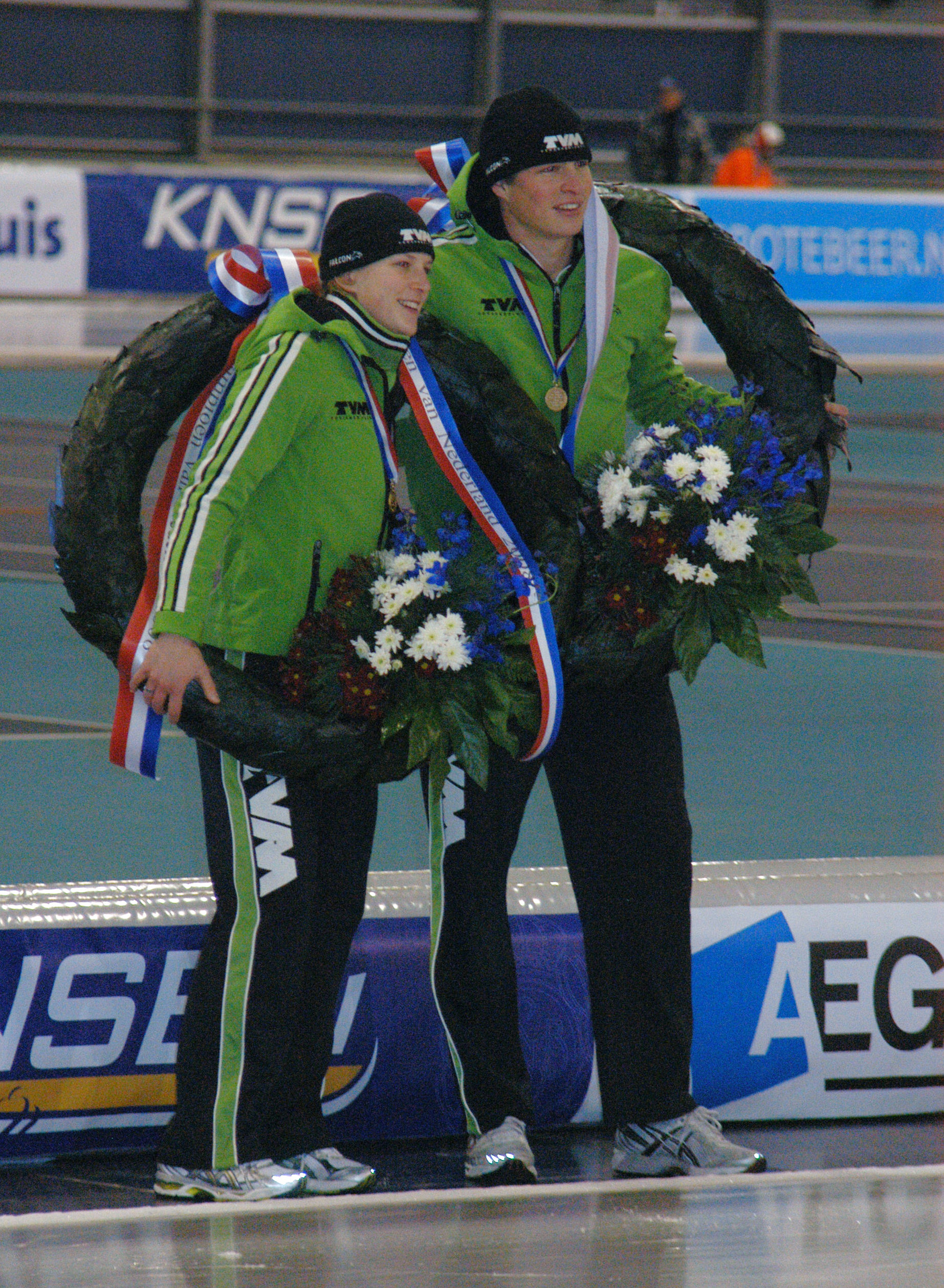
Dutch Champions Speedskating Allround 2008 Ireen Wüst and Sven Kramer.

The 2008 KNSB Dutch Allround Championships in speed skating were held at the Kardinge ice stadium in Groningen, Netherlands on 29 and 30 December 2007. Although the event took place in December 2007 this was the 2008 edition as it is part of the 2007–08 speed skating season.

Sven Kramer defended his 2007 title by winning all four distances. In the women's tournament Ireen Wüst won the tournament with only winning the opening 500 m, young gun Marrit Leenstra won the 1500 m and veteran Renate Groenewold the 3000 m and 5000 m.

== Schedule ==
Schedule
Date	Distances
Saturday; 29 December 2007	Women's 500 meter Men's 500 meter Women's 3000 meter Men's 5000 meter
Sunday; 30 December 2007	Women's 1500 meter Men's 1500 meter Women's 5000 meter Men's 10000 meter

== Medalists ==
=== Allround ===
Distance	Gold		Silver		Bronze	
Men's allround	Sven Kramer; TVM	153.513	Wouter olde Heuvel; TVM	155.731	Ben Jongejan; VPZ	157.040
Women's allround	Ireen Wüst; TVM	166.264	Renate Groenewold; TVM	167.082	Paulien van Deutekom; TVM	167.830

=== Distance ===
Distance	Gold		Silver		Bronze	
Men's 500 m	Sven Kramer; TVM	36.81	Jan Blokhuijsen; National Youth Team	37.13	Rhian Ket; APPM	37.51
Men's 1500 m	Sven Kramer; TVM	1:50.27; TR	Wouter olde Heuvel; TVM	1:50.46	Rhian Ket; APPM	1:50.84
Men's 5000 m	Sven Kramer; TVM	6:28.82; TR	Wouter olde Heuvel; TVM	6:35.38	Ben Jongejan; VPZ	6:39.30
Men's 10000 m	Sven Kramer; TVM	13:41.31; TR	Ted-Jan Bloemen; DSB	13:50.31	Carl Verheijen; TVM	13:50.73
Women's 500 m	Ireen Wüst; TVM	40.09	Marrit Leenstra; National Youth Team	40.32	Tessa van Dijk; VPZ	40.51
Women's 1500 m	Marrit Leenstra; National Youth Team	2:00.97; TR	Paulien van Deutekom; TVM	2:01.29	Renate Groenewold; TVM	2:01.92
Women's 3000 m	Renate Groenewold; TVM	4:09.70; TR	Ireen Wüst; TVM	4:11.01	Paulien van Deutekom; TVM	4:12.65
Women's 5000 m	Renate Groenewold; TVM	7:15.66; TR	Ireen Wüst; TVM	7:16.36	Paulien van Deutekom; TVM	7:23.92

NOTE: TR = track record.

== Men's results ==
Place	Athlete	500 m	5000 m	1500 m	10000 m	Points
1st place, gold medalist(s)	Sven Kramer	36.81 (1)	6:28.82 (1)	1:50.27 (1)	13:41.31 (1)	153.513
2nd place, silver medalist(s)	Wouter olde Heuvel	37.63 (5)	6:35.38 (2)	1:50.46 (2)	13:54.87 (5)	155.731
3rd place, bronze medalist(s)	Ben Jongejan	38.09 (12)	6:39.30 (3)	1:50.88 (4)	14:01.20 (7)	157.04
4	Ted-Jan Bloemen	37.80 (8)	6:42.28 (5)	1:53.62 (15)	13:50.31 (2)	157.416
5	Koen Verweij	37.59 (4)	6:44.61 (7)	1:52.20 (7)	14:02.47 (8)	157.574
6	Tim Roelofsen	37.87 (9)	6:44.23 (6)	1:52.18 (6)	13:59.68 (6)	157.67
7	Carl Verheijen	39.12 (21)	6:40.50 (4)	1:52.63 (12)	13:50.73 (3)	158.249
8	Jan Blokhuijsen	37.13 (2)	6:47.56 (12)	1:52.48 (11)	14:23.01 (11)	158.529
9	Bjarne Rykkje	37.96 (10)	6:49.09 (13)	1:52.42 (9)	14:11.79 (10)	158.931
10	Boris Kusmirak	39.02 (20)	6:46.05 (9)	1:53.64 (16)	14:11.14 (9)	160.062
11	Bob de Jong	39.45 (22)	6:44.62 (8)	1:55.74 (21)	13:52.70 (4)	160.127
12	Berden de Vries	37.72 (7)	6:57.00 (18)	1:51.41 (5)	14:31.90 (12)	160.151
NC13	Frank Vreugdenhil	38.20 (16)	6:49.56 (14)	1:53.05 (14)	–	116.839
NC14	Bart van den Berg	38.19 (15)	6:52.41 (16)	1:52.45 (10)	–	116.914
NC15	Tom Schuit	38.39 (17)	6:46.31 (10)	1:53.78 (17)	–	116.947
NC16	Rhian Ket	37.51 (3)	7:08.70 (22)	1:50.84 (3)	–	117.326
NC17	Michael Kaatee	38.14 (14)	6:58.52 (19)	1:52.23 (8)	–	117.402
NC18	Renz Rotteveel	38.04 (11)	6:54.00 (17)	1:53.98 (19)	–	117.433
NC19	Jarno Meijer	38.11 (13)	7:01.00 (20)	1:52.84 (13)	–	117.823
NC20	Rintje Ritsma	38.75 (19)	6:51.90 (15)	1:55.78 (22)	–	118.533
NC21	Ralph de Haan	38.67 (18)	7:04.62 (21)	1:53.96 (18)	–	119.118
NC22	Hein Otterspeer	37.63 (5)	7:15.88 (23)	1:54.17 (20)	–	119.274
NC23	Mark Ooijevaar	40.97 (23)	6:47.19 (11)	1:56.82 (23)	–	120.629

Source male: Schaatsstatistieken.nl

== Women's results ==
Place	Athlete	500 m	3000 m	1500 m	5000 m	Points
1st place, gold medalist(s)	Ireen Wüst	40.09 (1)	4:11.01 (2)	2:02.11 (4)	7:16.36 (2)	166.264
2nd place, silver medalist(s)	Renate Groenewold	41.26 (10)	4:09.70 (1)	2:01.92 (3)	7:15.66 (1)	167.082
3rd place, bronze medalist(s)	Paulien van Deutekom	40.90 (5)	4:12.65 (3)	2:01.29 (2)	7:23.92 (3)	167.830
4	Marrit Leenstra	40.32 (2)	4:17.92 (6)	2:00.97 (1)	7:27.49 (4)	168.378
5	Diane Valkenburg	40.93 (6)	4:16.37 (5)	2:02.22 (5)	7:27.86 (5)	169.184
6	Jorien Voorhuis	41.07 (9)	4:20.69 (7)	2:03.43 (6)	7:34.05 (6)	171.066
7	Wieteke Cramer	41.04 (7)	4:22.81 (9)	2:04.31 (7)	7:35.54 (8)	171.831
8	Lisette van der Geest	42.08 (14)	4:21.46 (8)	2:05.91 (13)	7:35.11 (7)	173.137
9	Tessa van Dijk	40.51 (3)	4:29.44 (15)	2:05.46 (12)	7:53.50 (9)	174.586
10	Ingeborg Kroon	40.83 (4)	4:30.74 (17)	2:05.13 (11)	7:57.85 (10)	175.448
NC11	Linda Bouwens	42.01 (13)	4:26.24 (12)	2:04.98 (10)	–	128.043
NC12	Foske Tamar van der Wal	42.80 (19)	4:23.13 (10)	2:04.56 (9)	–	128.175
NC13	Janneke Ensing	41.45 (11)	4:27.80 (13)	2:06.37 (15)	–	128.206
NC14	Maren van Spronsen	41.48 (12)	4:30.85 (18)	2:06.27 (14)	–	128.711
NC15	Gretha Smit	44.23 (20)	4:14.33 (4)	2:06.73 (16)	–	128.861
NC16	Helen van Goozen	42.25 (16)	4:25.31 (11)	2:08.22 (19)	–	129.208
NC17	Rixt Meijer	42.41 (17)	4:28.92 (14)	2:08.17 (18)	–	129.953
NC18	Cindy Vergeer	42.14 (15)	4:32.78 (19)	2:07.92 (17)	–	130.243
NC19	Lisanne Soemanta	42.70 (18)	4:29.72 (16)	2:08.65 (20)	–	130.536
DQ2	Sanne Delfgou	41.06 (8)	DQ	2:04.34 (8)	–	82.506

Source women: Schaatsstatistieken.nl
