= 2007 KNSB Dutch Allround Championships =

KNSB Dutch Allround Championships
- Venue: Thialf, Heerenveen
- Dates: 23 and 24 December 2006

Medalist men
1st place, gold medalist(s)		Sven Kramer
2nd place, silver medalist(s)		Carl Verheijen
3rd place, bronze medalist(s)		Erben Wennemars

Medalist women
1st place, gold medalist(s)		Ireen Wüst
2nd place, silver medalist(s)		Renate Groenewold
3rd place, bronze medalist(s)		Marja Vis

The 2007 KNSB Dutch Allround Championships in speed skating were held in the Thialf stadium in Heerenveen, Netherlands, on 23 and 24 December 2006. Although the event took place in December 2006 this was the 2007 edition as it is part of the 2006–07 speed skating season.

Sven Kramer won the men's allround event, finishing in the top four on all distances. Erben Wennemars won bronze in his first start at an allround championship. In the women's event, Ireen Wüst won both the shortest distances, and finished on the podium in all four distances to take overall victory by almost two points.

== Schedule ==
Schedule
Date	Distances
Saturday; 23 December 2006	Women's 500 meter Men's 500 meter Women's 3000 meter Men's 5000 meter
Sunday; 24 December 2006	Women's 1500 meter Men's 1500 meter Women's 5000 meter Men's 10,000 meter

== Medalists ==
=== Allround ===
Distance	Gold		Silver		Bronze	
Men's Allround	Sven Kramer	150.476	Carl Verheijen	151.688	Erben Wennemars	152.548
Women's Allround	Ireen Wüst	161.507	Renate Groenewold	163.644	Marja Vis	165.910

=== Distance ===
Distance	Gold		Silver		Bronze	
Men's 500 m	Erben Wennemars	35.92	Mark Tuitert	36.31	Sjoerd de Vries	36.50
Men's 1500 m	Erben Wennemars	1:47.16	Sven Kramer	1:47.70	Mark Tuitert	1:48.21
Men's 5000 m	Sven Kramer	6:22.16	Carl Verheijen	6:24.59	Wouter olde Heuvel	6:27.96
Men's 1000 m	Carl Verheijen	13:08.99	Sven Kramer	13:16.20	Bob de Jong	13:33.04
Women's 500 m	Ireen Wüst	[[ ]]	[[ ]]			
Women's 1500 m	Ireen Wüst	[[ ]]	[[ ]]			
Women's 3000 m	Renate Groenewold	[[ ]]	[[ ]]			
Women's 5000 m	Renate Groenewold	[[ ]]	[[ ]]			

== Men's results ==
=== 500 m ===
Pos.	Race	Time	Pos.	Rankings	Points
1.	Erben Wennemars	35.92	1.	Erben Wennemars	35.920
2.	Mark Tuitert	36.31	2.	Mark Tuitert	36.310
3.	Sjoerd de Vries	36.50	3.	Sjoerd de Vries	36.500
4.	Sven Kramer	36.55	4.	Sven Kramer	36.550
5.	Yuri Solinger	36.82	5.	Yuri Solinger	36.820
6.	Berden de Vries	37.10	6.	Berden de Vries	37.100
7.	Bjarne Rykkje	37.16	7.	Bjarne Rykkje	37.160
8.	Rhian Ket	37.18	8.	Rhian Ket	37.180
9.	Ben Jongejan	37.21	9.	Ben Jongejan	37.210
10.	Wouter olde Heuvel	37.32	10.	Wouter olde Heuvel	37.320
12.	Carl Verheijen	37.53	12.	Carl Verheijen	37.530
13.	Jochem Uytdehaage	37.55	13.	Jochem Uytdehaage	37.550
16.	Rintje Ritsma	37.67	16.	Rintje Ritsma	37.670
24.	Bob de Jong	38.89	24.	Bob de Jong	38.890

=== 5000 m ===
Pos.	Race	Time	Pos.	Rankings	Points
1.	Sven Kramer	6:22.16	1.	Sven Kramer	74.766
2.	Carl Verheijen	6:24.59	2.	Mark Tuitert	75.523
3.	Wouter olde Heuvel	6:27.96	3.	Erben Wennemars	75.599
4.	Bob de Jong	6:30.67	4.	Carl Verheijen	75.989
5.	Rintje Ritsma	6:31.13	5.	Wouter olde Heuvel	76.116
6.	Tom Prinsen	6:31.56	6.	Rintje Ritsma	76.783
7.	Mark Tuitert	6:32.13	7.	Jochem Uytdehaage	76.822
8.	Jochem Uytdehaage	6:32.72	8.	Ben Jongejan	76.826
9.	Ralph de Haan	6:35.39	9.	Sjoerd de Vries	76.945
10.	Ben Jongejan	6:36.16	10.	Bjarne Rykkje	77.265
11.	Boris Kucsmirak	6:36.52	11.	Sicco Janmaat	77.314
12.	Erben Wennemars	6:36.79	12.	Tom Prinsen	77.316
13.	Sicco Janmaat	6:37.24	13.	Ralph de Haan	77.449
14.	Frank Vreugdenhil	6:38.37	14.	Frank Vreugdenhil	77.517

=== 1500 m ===
Pos.	Race	Time	Pos.	Rankings	Points
1.	Erben Wennemars	1:47.16	1.	Sven Kramer	110.666	Q
2.	Sven Kramer	1:47.70	2.	Erben Wennemars	111.319	Q
3.	Mark Tuitert	1:48.21	3.	Mark Tuitert	111.593	Q
4.	Ben Jongejan	1:48.60	4.	Carl Verheijen	112.239	Q
5.	Carl Verheijen	1:48.75	5.	Wouter olde Heuvel	112.656	Q
6.	Rhian Ket	1:49.15	6.	Ben Jongejan	113.026	Q
7.	Wouter olde Heuvel	1:49.62	7.	Sjoerd de Vries	113.561
8.	Yuri Solinger	1:49.84	8.	Jochem Uytdehaage	113.972	Q
9.	Sjoerd de Vries	1:49.85	9.	Tom Prinsen	113.986	Q
10.	Tom Prinsen	1:50.01	10.	Rintje Ritsma	114.016	Q
11.	Michael Kaatee	1:50.64	11.	Rhian Ket	114.253	Q
16.	Bob de Jong	1:51.35	12.	Bjarne Rykkje	114.335
17.	Jochem Uytdehaage	1:51.45	15.	Ralph de Haan	114.512	Q
21.	Rintje Ritsma	1:51.70	17.	Bob de Jong	115.073	Q

=== 10,000 m ===
Pos.	Race	Time	Pos.	Rankings	Points
1.	Carl Verheijen	13:08.99	1.	Sven Kramer	150.476
2.	Sven Kramer	13:16.20	2.	Carl Verheijen	151.698
3.	Bob de Jong	13:33.04	3.	Erben Wennemars	152.548
4.	Wouter olde Heuvel	13:34.55	4.	Mark Tuitert	152.712
5.	Rintje Ritsma	13:36.67	5.	Wouter olde Heuvel	153.383
6.	Tom Prinsen	13:40.37	6.	Rintje Ritsma	154.849
7.	Mark Tuitert	13:42.38	7.	Ben Jongejan	154.929
8.	Erben Wennemars	13:44.58	8.	Tom Prinsen	155.004
9.	Jochem Uytdehaage	13:46.15	9.	Jochem Uytdehaage	155.279
10.	Ben Jongejan	13:58.07	10.	Bob de Jong	155.725
11.	Ralph de Haan	13:59.28	11.	Ralph de Haan	156.476
12.	Rhian Ket	14:50.49	12.	Rhian Ket	158.777

=== Allround results ===
Place	Athlete	Country	500m	5000m	1500m	10,000m	Points
1st place, gold medalist(s)	Sven Kramer	Netherlands	36.55 (4)	6:22.16 (1)	1:47.70 (2)	13:16.20 (2)	150.476
2nd place, silver medalist(s)	Carl Verheijen	Netherlands	37.53 (12)	6:24.59 (2)	1:48.75 (5)	13:08.99 (1)	151.688
3rd place, bronze medalist(s)	Erben Wennemars	Netherlands	35.92 (1)	6:36.79 (12)	1:47.16 (1)	13:44.58 (8)	152.548
4	Mark Tuitert	Netherlands	36.31 (2)	6:32.13 (7)	1:48.21 (3)	13:42.38 (7)	152.712
5	Wouter olde Heuvel	Netherlands	37.32 (10)	6:27.96 (3)	1:49.62 (7)	13:34.55 (4)	153.383
6	Rintje Ritsma	Netherlands	37.67 (16)	6:31.13 (5)	1:51.70 (21)	13:36.67 (5)	154.849
7	Ben Jongejan	Netherlands	37.21 (9)	6:36.16 (10)	1:48.60 (4)	13:58.07 (10)	154.929
8	Tom Prinsen	Netherlands	38.16 (21)	6:31.56 (6)	1:50.01 (10)	13:40.37 (6)	155.004
9	Jochem Uytdehaage	Netherlands	37.55 (13)	6:32.72 (8)	1:51.45 (17)	13:46.15 (9)	155.279
10	Bob de Jong	Netherlands	38.89 (24)	6:30.67 (4)	1:51.35 (16)	13:33.04 (3)	155.725
11	Ralph de Haan	Netherlands	37.91 (19)	6:35.39 (9)	1:51.19 (14)	13:59.28 (11)	156.476
12	Rhian Ket	Netherlands	37.18 (8)	6:46.90 (21)	1:49.15 (6)	14:50.49 (12)	158.777
NQ13	Sjoerd de Vries	Netherlands	36.50 (3)	6:44.45 (20)	1:49.85 (9)	-	113.561
NQ14	Bjarne Rykkje	Netherlands	37.16 (7)	6:41.05 (16)	1:51.21 (15)	-	114.335
NQ15	Sicco Janmaat	Netherlands	37.59 (14)	6:37.24 (13)	1:51.08 (13)	-	114.340
NQ16	Frank Vreugdenhil	Netherlands	37.68 (17)	6:38.37 (14)	1:50.82 (12)	-	114.457
NQ17	Yuri Solinger	Netherlands	36.82 (5)	6:51.21 (24)	1:49.84 (8)	-	114.554
NQ18	Jan Hessel Boermans	Netherlands	37.51 (11)	6:48.58 (23)	1:51.65 (20)	-	115.584
NQ19	Eelco Bakermans	Netherlands	37.83 (18)	6:47.18 (22)	1:51.57 (18)	-	115.738
NQ20	Ralf van der Rijst	Netherlands	38.36 (22)	6:42.20 (17)	1:51.58 (19)	-	115.773
NQ21	Ted-Jan Bloemen	Netherlands	38.02 (20)	6:38.38 (15)	1:54.40 (25)	-	115.991
NQ22	Michael Kaatee	Netherlands	37.61 (15)	6:55.99 (25)	1:50.64 (11)	-	116.089
NQ23	Boris Kusmirak	Netherlands	39.04 (25)	6:36.52 (11)	1:52.45 (22)	-	116.175
NQ24	Arnaud Venema	Netherlands	38.42 (23)	6:44.09 (19)	1:52.66 (23)	-	116.382
NQ25	Arjen van der Kieft	Netherlands	39.74 (26)	6:43.92 (18)	1:53.88 (24)	-	118.092
NQ26	Berden de Vries	Netherlands	37.10 (6)	7:01.22 (26)	-	-	79.222

NQ = Not qualified for the 10,000m (only the best 12 are qualified)

Source: Schaatsstatistieken.nl

Kramer, Verheijen, Tuitert and olde Heuvel were selected for the 2007 European Championships. Wennemars said he was not after qualifying for the European Championship, and will instead take part in the 2007 World Sprint Championships the following week.

== Women's results ==
=== 500 m ===
Pos.	Race	Time	Pos.	Rankings	Points
1.	Ireen Wüst	39.28	1.	Ireen Wüst	39.280
2.	Natasja Bruintjes	40.15	2.	Natasja Bruintjes	40.150
3.	Paulien van Deutekom	40.47	3.	Paulien van Deutekom	40.470
4.	Laurine van Riessen	40.50	4.	Laurine van Riessen	40.500
5.	Jorien Voorhuis	40.55	5.	Jorien Voorhuis	40.550
6.	Ingeborg Kroon	40.57	6.	Ingeborg Kroon	40.570
7.	Renate Groenewold	40.62	7.	Renate Groenewold	40.620
8.	Wieteke Cramer	40.81	8.	Wieteke Cramer	40.810
9.	Els Murris	40.84	9.	Els Murris	40.840
10.	Tessa van Dijk	40.86	10.	Tessa van Dijk	40.860
11.	Marja Vis	40.91	11.	Marja Vis	40.910
12.	Marrit Leenstra	41.27	12.	Marrit Leenstra	41.270
14.	Moniek Kleinsman	41.38	14.	Moniek Kleinsman	41.380
18.	Gretha Smit	44.15	18.	Gretha Smit	44.150

=== 3000 m ===
Pos.	Race	Time	Pos.	Rankings	Points
1.	Renate Groenewold	4:03.83	1.	Ireen Wüst	80.053
2.	Ireen Wüst	4:04.64	2.	Renate Groenewold	81.258
3.	Marja Vis	4:09.69	3.	Paulien van Deutekom	82.268
4.	Paulien van Deutekom	4:10.79	4.	Marja Vis	82.525
5.	Gretha Smit	4:10.86	5.	Jorien Voorhuis	83.076
6.	Tessa van Dijk	4:13.73	6.	Tessa van Dijk	83.148
7.	Helen van Goozen	4:14.95	7.	Wieteke Cramer	83.645
8.	Jorien Voorhuis	4:15.16	8.	Ingeborg Kroon	83.825
9.	Wieteke Cramer	4:17.01	9.	Moniek Kleinsman	84.283
10.	Moniek Kleinsman	4:17.42	10.	Laurine van Riessen	84.448
11.	Linda Bouwens	4:18.20	11.	Janneke Ensing	84.603
12.	Diane Valkenburg	4:19.03	12.	Marrit Leenstra	84.620
13.	Ingeborg Kroon	4:19.53	13.	Els Murris	84.815
14.	Janneke Ensing	4:19.82	14.	Diane Valkenburg	84.831

=== 1500 m ===
Pos.	Race	Time	Pos.	Rankings	Points
1.	Ireen Wüst	1:55.88	1.	Ireen Wüst	118.679	Q
2.	Renate Groenewold	1:59.26	2.	Renate Groenewold	121.011	Q
3.	Paulien van Deutekom	1:59.78	3.	Paulien van Deutekom	122.194	Q
4.	Marja Vis	1:59.89	4.	Marja Vis	122.488	Q
5.	Ingeborg Kroon	2:00.27	5.	Tessa van Dijk	123.254	Q
6.	Tessa van Dijk	2:00.32	6.	Jorien Voorhuis	123.336	Q
7.	Els Murris	2:00.44	7.	Ingeborg Kroon	123.915	Q
8.	Jorien Voorhuis	2:00.78	8.	Wieteke Cramer	124.358	Q
9.	Marrit Leenstra	2:01.09	9.	Laurine van Riessen	124.898
10.	Laurine van Riessen	2:01.35	10.	Els Murris	124.961
11.	Wieteke Cramer	2:02.14	11.	Marrit Leenstra	124.983
12.	Janneke Ensing	2:02.92	13.	Moniek Kleinsman	125.676
14.	Moniek Kleinsman	2:04.18	16.	Helen van Goozen	126.447	Q
18.	Gretha Smit	2:05.42	18.	Gretha Smit	127.766	Q

=== 5000 m ===
Pos.	Race	Time	Pos.	Rankings	Points
1.	Renate Groenewold	7:06.33	1.	Ireen Wüst	161.507
2.	Gretha Smit	7:07.41	2.	Renate Groenewold	163.644
3.	Ireen Wüst	7:08.28	3.	Marja Vis	165.910
4.	Marja Vis	7:14.22	4.	Paulien van Deutekom	166.443
5.	Tessa van Dijk	7:18.85	5.	Tessa van Dijk	167.139
6.	Paulien van Deutekom	7:22.49	6.	Jorien Voorhuis	167.740
7.	Jorien Voorhuis	7:24.04	7.	Wieteke Cramer	169.573
8.	Helen van Goozen	7:25.21	8.	Gretha Smit	170.507
9.	Wieteke Cramer	7:32.15	9.	Helen van Goozen	170.968
10.	Ingeborg Kroon	7:53.09	10.	Ingeborg Kroon	171.224

=== Allround results ===
Place	Athlete	Country	500m	5000m	1500m	10,000m	Points
1st place, gold medalist(s)	Ireen Wüst	Netherlands	39.28 (1)	4:04.64 (2)	1:55.88 (1)	7:08.28 (3)	161.507
2nd place, silver medalist(s)	Renate Groenewold	Netherlands	40.62 (7)	4:03.83 (1)	1:59.26 (2)	7:06.33 (1)	163.644
3rd place, bronze medalist(s)	Marja Vis	Netherlands	40.91 (11)	4:09.69 (3)	1:59.89 (4)	7:14.22 (4)	165.910
4	Paulien van Deutekom	Netherlands	40.47 (3)	4:10.79 (4)	1:59.78 (3)	7:22.49 (6)	166.443
5	Tessa van Dijk	Netherlands	40.86 (10)	4:13.73 (6)	2:00.32 (6)	7:18.85 (5)	167.139
6	Jorien Voorhuis	Netherlands	40.55 (5)	4:15.16 (8)	2:00.78 (8)	7:24.04 (7)	167.740
7	Wieteke Cramer	Netherlands	40.81 (8)	4:17.01 (9)	2:02.14 (11)	7:32.15 (9)	169.573
8	Gretha Smit	Netherlands	44.15 (18)	4:10.86 (5)	2:05.42 (18)	7:07.41 (2)	170.507
9	Helen van Goozen	Netherlands	42.39 (17)	4:14.95 (7)	2:04.70 (16)	7:25.21 (8)	170.968
10	Ingeborg Kroon	Netherlands	40.57 (6)	4:19.53 (13)	2:00.27 (5)	7:53.09 (10)	171.224
NQ11	Laurine van Riessen	Netherlands	40.50 (4)	4:23.69 (16)	2:01.35 (10)	-	124.898
NQ12	Els Murris	Netherlands	40.84 (9)	4:23.85 (17)	2:00.44 (7)	-	124.961
NQ13	Marrit Leenstra	Netherlands	41.27 (12)	4:20.10 (15)	2:01.09 (9)	-	124.983
NQ14	Janneke Ensing	Netherlands	41.30 (13)	4:19.82 (14)	2:02.92 (12)	-	125.576
NQ15	Moniek Kleinsman	Netherlands	41.38 (14)	4:17.42 (10)	2:04.18 (14)	-	125.676
NQ16	Diane Valkenburg	Netherlands	41.66 (15)	4:19.03 (12)	2:04.01 (13)	-	126.167
NQ17	Natasja Bruintjes	Netherlands	40.15 (2)	4:28.28 (18)	2:04.54 (15)	-	126.376
NQ18	Linda Bouwens	Netherlands	41.83 (16)	4:18.20 (11)	2:04.87 (17)	-	126.486

NQ = Not qualified for the 5000m (only the best 12 are qualified)

Source: Schaatsstatistieken.nl

Wüst, Groenewold, Vis and Van Deutekom were selected for the European Championships.
