= 2009 KNSB Dutch Allround Championships =

KNSB Dutch Allround Championships
- Venue: Thialf, Heerenveen
- Dates: 27 and 28 December 2008

Medalist men
1st place, gold medalist(s)		Sven Kramer
2nd place, silver medalist(s)		Wouter olde Heuvel
3rd place, bronze medalist(s)		Carl Verheijen

Medalist women
1st place, gold medalist(s)		Ireen Wüst
2nd place, silver medalist(s)		Elma de Vries
3rd place, bronze medalist(s)		Paulien van Deutekom

The 2009 KNSB Dutch Allround Championships in speed skating were held at the Thialf ice stadium in Heerenveen, Netherlands on 27 and 28 December 2008. The championships were part of the 2008–09 speed skating season.

The men's and women's winners, Ireen Wüst and Sven Kramer both prolonged their title.

== Schedule ==
Schedule
Date	Distances
Saturday; 27 December 2008	Women's 500 meter Men's 500 meter Women's 3000 meter Men's 5000 meter
Sunday; 28 December 2008	Women's 1500 meter Men's 1500 meter Women's 5000 meter Men's 10000 meter

== Medalists ==
=== Allround ===
Distance	Gold		Silver		Bronze	
Men's allround	Sven Kramer	149.397	Wouter olde Heuvel	152.356	Carl Verheijen	153.340
Women's allround	Ireen Wüst	164.614	Elma de Vries	165.437	Paulien van Deutekom	165.668

=== Distance ===
Distance	Gold		Silver		Bronze	
Men's 500 m	Erben Wennemars	35.82	Rhian Ket	36.65	Sven Kramer	36.73
Men's 1500 m	Sven Kramer	1:47.34	Rhian Ket	1:47.99	Erben Wennemars	1:48.00
Men's 5000 m	Sven Kramer	6:16.77	Wouter olde Heuvel	6:23.77	Bob de Jong	6:24.25
Men's 10000 m	Sven Kramer	13:04.21	Bob de Jong	13:11.25	Carl Verheijen	13:27.47
Women's 500 m	Ireen Wüst	40.05	Marrit Leenstra	40.07	Jorien Voorhuis	40.35
Women's 1500 m	Ireen Wüst	1:59.23	Elma de Vries	1:59.48	Renate Groenewold	1:59.61
Women's 3000 m	Renate Groenewold	4:06.92	Paulien van Deutekom	4:09.51	Ireen Wüst	4:09.68
Women's 5000 m	Ireen Wüst	7:12.08	Jorien Voorhuis	7:12.71	Paulien van Deutekom	7:12.77

== Men's results ==
Place	Athlete	500 m	5000 m	1500 m	10000 m	Points
1st place, gold medalist(s)	Sven Kramer	36.73 (3)	6:16.77 (1)	1:47.34 (1)	13:04.21 (1)	149.397
2nd place, silver medalist(s)	Wouter olde Heuvel	37.36 (12)	6:23.77 (2)	1:48.69 (5)	13:27.78 (4)	152.356
3rd place, bronze medalist(s)	Carl Verheijen	37.91 (19)	6:25.87 (4)	1:49.41 (7)	13:27.47 (3)	153.340
4	Koen Verweij	37.13 (7)	6:33.09 (6)	1:48.59 (4)	13:34.46 (5)	153.358
5	Erben Wennemars	35.82 (1)	6:39.93 (14)	1:48.00 (3)	13:54.14 (8)	153.520
6	Ben Jongejan	37.35 (11)	6:31.43 (5)	1:48.78 (6)	13:40.33 (6)	153.769
7	Bob de Jong	39.05 (24)	6:24.25 (3)	1:51.48 (19)	13:11.25 (2)	154.197
8	Jan Blokhuijsen	36.93 (5)	6:37.95 (10)	1:50.28 (14)	13:56.43 (9)	155.306
9	Frank Vreugdenhil	37.79 (18)	6:35.30 (8)	1:50.11 (13)	13:59.38 (10)	155.992
10	Boris Kusmirak	38.64 (23)	6:37.64 (9)	1:50.50 (16)	13:50.90 (7)	156.782
11	Michael Kaatee	37.18 (9)	6:45.82 (17)	1:49.68 (9)	14:17.18 (11)	157.181
NC12	Renz Rotteveel	37.67 (17)	6:34.60 (7)	1:49.47 (8)	DQ	113.620
NC13	Rhian Ket	36.65 (2)	6:51.72 (24)	1:47.99 (2)	WDR	113.818
NC14	Pim Cazemier	37.57 (13)	6:39.74 (13)	1:50.70 (17)	-	114.444
NC15	Berden de Vries	36.92 (4)	6:49.55 (22)	1:49.78 (10)	-	114.468
NC16	Tim Roelofsen	36.97 (6)	6:50.51 (23)	1:49.86 (12)	-	114.641
NC17	Tom Schuit	37.95 (21)	6:41.88 (15)	1:50.30 (15)	-	114.904
NC18	Elwin Hulsink	37.62 (16)	6:46.96 (18)	1:49.84 (11)	-	114.929
NC19	Demian Roelofs	37.14 (8)	6:48.76 (20)	1:51.29 (18)	-	115.112
NC20	Joost Kool	37.92 (20)	6:39.60 (12)	1:52.41 (22)	-	115.350
NC21	Robbert de Rijk	37.58 (14)	6:49.47 (21)	1:51.54 (20)	-	115.707
NC22	Rienk Nauta	37.59 (15)	6:47.85 (19)	1:52.06 (21)	-	115.728
DQ3	Tom Prinsen	37.31 (10)	6:38.69 (11)	DQ	-	77.179
DNS3	Ted-Jan Bloemen	38.35 (22)	6:43.53 (16)	DNS	-	78.703

Source men: Schaatsstatistieken.nl

== Women's results ==
Place	Athlete	500 m	3000 m	1500 m	5000 m	Points
1st place, gold medalist(s)	Ireen Wüst	40.05 (1)	4:09.68 (3)	1:59.23 (1)	7:12.08 (1)	164.614
2nd place, silver medalist(s)	Elma de Vries	40.41 (4)	4:10.04 (4)	1:59.48 (2)	7:15.28 (4)	165.437
3rd place, bronze medalist(s)	Paulien van Deutekom	40.51 (5)	4:09.51 (2)	2:00.89 (5)	7:12.77 (3)	165.668
4	Jorien Voorhuis	40.35 (3)	4:11.69 (6)	2:01.31 (6)	7:12.71 (2)	166.005
5	Marrit Leenstra	40.07 (2)	4:11.15 (5)	2:00.11 (4)	7:30.08 (7)	166.972
6	Lisette van der Geest	40.86 (9)	4:14.24 (8)	2:01.46 (7)	7:19.08 (5)	167.627
7	Wieteke Cramer	40.83 (7)	4:18.26 (13)	2:01.92 (10)	7:30.34 (8)	169.547
8	Annouk van der Weijden	41.10 (14)	4:16.62 (9)	2:03.37 (16)	7:26.42 (6)	169.635
9	Yvonne Nauta	41.30 (16)	4:16.79 (10)	2:01.90 (9)	7:31.28 (9)	169.859
10	Renate Groenewold	40.81 (6)	4:06.92 (1)	1:59.61 (3)	DQ	121.833
NC11	Janneke Ensing	41.30 (16)	4:17.33 (12)	2:03.01 (14)	-	125.191
NC12	Maren van Spronsen	41.09 (13)	4:22.19 (16)	2:01.85 (8)	-	125.404
NC13	Linda Bouwens	41.49 (20)	4:18.63 (14)	2:02.63 (12)	-	125.471
NC14	Moniek Kleinsman	41.29 (15)	4:17.27 (11)	2:04.15 (17)	-	125.551
NC15	Roxanne van Hemert	40.89 (10)	4:26.98 (21)	2:02.01 (11)	-	126.056
NC16	Marije Joling	41.30 (16)	4:23.48 (18)	2:02.88 (13)	-	126.173
NC17	Rixt Meijer	41.50 (21)	4:21.47 (15)	2:04.43 (18)	-	126.554
NC18	Cindy Vergeer	41.45 (19)	4:23.16 (17)	2:04.71 (19)	-	126.880
NC19	Linda de Vries	41.67 (22)	4:25.34 (19)	2:03.09 (15)	-	126.923
NC20	Marit Dekker	40.84 (8)	4:27.06 (22)	2:07.69 (20)	-	127.913
NC21	Diane Valkenburg	41.08 (12)	4:13.82 (7)	-	-
WDR3	Sanne Delfgou	40.96 (11)	4:25.62 (20)	WDR	-	85.230

Source women: Schaatsstatistieken.nl
