= 2009 KNSB Dutch Single Distance Championships – Men's 1500 m =

Dutch speed skating competition

- Venue: Thialf, Heerenveen
- Dates: 2 November 2008
- Competitors: 24 skaters

Medalist men
1st place, gold medalist(s)		Sven Kramer	NED
2nd place, silver medalist(s)		Mark Tuitert	NED
3rd place, bronze medalist(s)		Simon Kuipers	NED

The men's 1500 m at the 2009 KNSB Dutch Single Distance Championships in Heerenveen took place at Thialf on 2 November 2008. 24 athletes participated in the contest.. Simon Kuipers was the title holder.

== Result ==
Rank	Athlete	Time
1st place, gold medalist(s)	Sven Kramer	1:45.81
2nd place, silver medalist(s)	Mark Tuitert	1:46.06
3rd place, bronze medalist(s)	Simon Kuipers	1:46.35
4	Erben Wennemars	1:46.67
5	Stefan Groothuis	1:47.11
6	Rhian Ket	1:47.89
7	Beorn Nijenhuis	1:47.91
8	Koen Verweij	1:47.97 PR
9	Sjoerd de Vries	1:48.29
10	Lars Elgersma	1:48.52
11	Remco olde Heuvel	1:48.56
12	Stevin Hilbrands	1:49.06 PR
13	Tom Prinsen	1:49.18
14	Jan Blokhuijsen	1:49.44
15	Ben Jongejan	1:49.48
16	Tim Roelofsen	1:49.67
17	Yuri Solinger	1:49.79
18	Renz Rotteveel	1:49.86 PR
19	Pim Schipper	1:49.86
20	Tom Schuit	1:50.38
21	Elwin Hulsink	1:50.59 PR
22	Tim Salomons	1:51.90
23	Bart van den Berg	1:51.98
NC	Jarno Meijer	-
