= 2010 KNSB Dutch Single Distance Championships – Men's 1500 m =

Dutch speed skating competition

- Venue: Thialf, Heerenveen
- Dates: 30 October – 1 November 2009
- Competitors: 26 skaters

Medalist men
1st place, gold medalist(s)		Rhian Ket	NED
2nd place, silver medalist(s)		Mark Tuitert	NED
3rd place, bronze medalist(s)		Stefan Groothuis	NED

The men's 1500 m at the 2010 KNSB Dutch Single Distance Championships in Heerenveen took place at Thialf on Sunday 1 November 2009. 26 athletes participated in the contest. The top five speed skaters qualified for the 1500 m at the 2009–10 ISU Speed Skating World Cup. Sven Kramer was the title holder.

== Results ==
=== Final results ===
Rank	Athlete	Time
1st place, gold medalist(s)	Rhian Ket	1:45.89 PR
2nd place, silver medalist(s)	Mark Tuitert	1:46.19
3rd place, bronze medalist(s)	Stefan Groothuis	1:46.39
4	Remco olde Heuvel	1:46.69
5	Erben Wennemars	1:46.88
6	Kjeld Nuis	1:47.08 PR
7	Jan Blokhuijsen	1:47.12
8	Simon Kuipers	1:47.23
9	Koen Verweij	1:47.25
10	Sven Kramer	1:47.36
11	Beorn Nijenhuis	1:47.86
12	Carl Verheijen	1:48.10
13	Pim Schipper	1:48.16
14	Ben Jongejan	1:48.44
15	Renz Rotteveel	1:48.46 PR
16	Tim Roelofsen	1:48.65
17	Ted-Jan Bloemen	1:49.22
18	Pim Cazemier	1:49.47
19	Robbert de Rijk	1:49.59
20	Tim Salomons	1:49.67
21	Sjoerd de Vries	1:50.03
22	Jacques de Koning	1:50.71
23	Michel Mulder	1:51.33
24	Rigard van Klooster	1:51.73
25	Berden de Vries	1:52.44
26	Lars Elgersma	1:52.88

Notes:

PR = personal record

=== Draw ===
Heat	Inner lane	Outer lane
1	Rigard van Klooster	Jacques de Koning
2	Berden de Vries	Michel Mulder
3	Tim Salomons	Robbert de Rijk
4	Pim Schipper	Kjeld Nuis
5	Pim Cazemier	Ted-Jan Bloemen
6	Ben Jongejan	Beorn Nijenhuis
7	Lars Elgersma	Remco olde Heuvel
8	Jan Blokhuijsen	Renz Rotteveel
9	Tim Roelofsen	Koen Verweij
10	Mark Tuitert	Rhian Ket
11	Carl Verheijen	Simon Kuipers
12	Erben Wennemars	Stefan Groothuis
13	Sven Kramer	Sjoerd de Vries
