= 2009 KNSB Dutch Single Distance Championships =

Speed skating competition

- Venue: Thialf, Heerenveen
- Dates: 31 October–2 November 2008

The 2009 KNSB Dutch Single Distance Championships was held from Friday 31 October until Sunday 2 November 2008 at the Thialf ice stadium in Heerenveen. Although the championships were held in 2008 it was the 2009 edition as it is part of the 2008–2009 speed skating season.

== Schedule ==
Schedule
Date	Time	Event
31 October 2008	15:30	Women's 500 m 1st run Men's 500 m 1st run Men's 5000 m Women's 500 m 2nd run Men's 500 m 2nd run
1 November 2008	13:15	Women's 1000 m Men's 1000 m Women's 3000 m
2 November 2008	12:30	Women's 1500 m Men's 1500 m Women's 5000 m Men's 10,000 m

== Medalists ==
=== Men ===
Distance	Gold		Silver		Bronze	
2x500 m details	Jan Smeekens; TVM	70.630 (35.38/35.25)	Simon Kuipers; DSB	70.870 (35.48/35.39)	Mark Tuitert; DSB	70.970 (35.46/35.51)
1000 m details	Stefan Groothuis; DSB	1:08.82	Erben Wennemars; TVM	1:09.34	Mark Tuitert; DSB	1:09.44
1500 m details	Sven Kramer; TVM	1:45.81	Mark Tuitert; DSB	1:46.06	Simon Kuipers; DSB	1:46.35
5000 m details	Sven Kramer; TVM	6:14.90	Carl Verheijen; TVM	6:21.48	Wouter olde Heuvel; TVM	6:23.69
10000 m details	Sven Kramer; TVM	13:09.84	Carl Verheijen; TVM	13:13.88	Bob de Jong; VPZ	13:19.34

Source: www.schaatsen.nl & SchaatsStatistieken.nl

=== Women ===
Distance	Gold		Silver		Bronze	
2x500 m details	Annette Gerritsen; DSB	77.380 (38.98/38.40)	Margot Boer; DSB	78.070 (39.11/38.96)	Thijsje Oenema; VPZ	78.660 (39.37/39.29
1000 m details	Paulien van Deutekom; TVM	1:16.66	Annette Gerritsen; DSB	1:17.34	Natasja Bruintjes; KNSB Neo-Seniors	1:17.72
1500 m details	Paulien van Deutekom; TVM	1:58.16	Ireen Wüst; TVM	1:59.07	Marrit Leenstra; TVM	1:59.43
3000 m details	Renate Groenewold; TVM	4:06.99	Paulien van Deutekom; TVM	4:08.49	Lisette van der Geest; KNSB Regional	4:09.49
5000 m details	Renate Groenewold; TVM	7:04.00	Gretha Smit; Hofmeier	7:08.83	Lisette van der Geest; KNSB Regional	7:13.86

Source: www.schaatsen.nl & SchaatsStatistieken.nl
