= 2010 KNSB Dutch Single Distance Championships – Men's 5000 m =

- Venue: Thialf, Heerenveen
- Dates: 30 October - 1 November 2009
- Competitors: 20 skaters

Medalist men
1st place, gold medalist(s)		Sven Kramer	NED
2nd place, silver medalist(s)		Bob de Jong	NED
3rd place, bronze medalist(s)		Wouter olde Heuvel	NED

The men's 5000 m at the 2010 KNSB Dutch Single Distance Championships in Heerenveen took place at Thialf on Friday 30 October 2009. 20 athletes participated in the contest. Sven Kramer was the title holder. The top five speed skaters qualified for the 5000 m at the 2009–10 ISU Speed Skating World Cup.

== Results ==
=== Final result ===
Rank	Athlete	Time
1st place, gold medalist(s)	Sven Kramer	6:20.71
2nd place, silver medalist(s)	Bob de Jong	6:23.13
3rd place, bronze medalist(s)	Wouter olde Heuvel	6:25.33
4	Koen Verweij	6:26.37 PR
5	Carl Verheijen	6:27.27
6	Jan Blokhuijsen	6:28.25
7	Arjen van der Kieft	6:29.95
8	Renz Rotteveel	6:30.15 PR
9	Ted-Jan Bloemen	6:31.17
10	Tim Roelofsen	6:31.68
11	Bob de Vries	6:31.84
12	Mark Ooijevaar	6:34.79
13	Ben Jongejan	6:36.08
14	Jouke Hoogeveen	6:37.31 PR
15	Boris Kusmirak	6:38.23
16	Willem Hut	6:38.67 PR
17	Joost Kool	6:39.87
18	Pim Cazemier	6:40.48
19	Tom Prinsen	6:42.10
20	Robbert de Rijk	6:47.40

Notes:
PR = personal record

=== Draw ===
Heat	Inner lane	Outer lane
1	Willem Hut	Robbert de Rijk
2	Jouke Hoogeveen	Pim Cazemier
3	Tim Roelofsen	Boris Kusmirak
4	Joost Kool	Renz Rotteveel
5	Mark Ooijevaar	Tom Prinsen
6	Koen Verweij	Arjen van der Kieft
7	Ted-Jan Bloemen	Ben Jongejan
8	Bob de Vries	Jan Blokhuijsen
9	Sven Kramer	Wouter olde Heuvel
10	Bob de Jong	Carl Verheijen
