= 2010 KNSB Dutch Single Distance Championships – Men's 10,000 m =

Dutch speed skating competition

- Venue: Thialf, Heerenveen
- Dates: 1 November 2009
- Competitors: 12

Medalist men
1st place, gold medalist(s)		Sven Kramer	NED
2nd place, silver medalist(s)		Bob de Jong	NED
3rd place, bronze medalist(s)		Carl Verheijen	NED

The men's 10,000 meter at the 2010 KNSB Dutch Single Distance Championships took place in Heerenveen at the Thialf ice skating rink on Sunday 1 November 2009. Although this tournament was held in 2009 it was part of the speed skating season 2009–2010. There were 12 participants.

== Statistics ==
=== Result ===
Position	Skater	Time
1st place, gold medalist(s)	Sven Kramer	13:04.55
2nd place, silver medalist(s)	Bob de Jong	13:06.61
3rd place, bronze medalist(s)	Carl Verheijen	13:11.81
4	Arjen van der Kieft	13:16.31 PR
5	Wouter Olde Heuvel	13:20.61
6	Bob de Vries	13:22.71 PR
7	Mark Ooijevaar	13:27.03
8	Koen Verweij	13:27.28 PR
9	Jan Blokhuijsen	13:31.15 PR
10	Ted-Jan Bloemen	13:35.80
11	Ben Jongejan	13:54.27
12	Tom Schuit	13:57.39

=== Draw ===
Heat	Inside lane	Outside lane
1	Tom Schuit	Bob de Vries
2	Jan Blokhuijsen	Ben Jongejan
3	Mark Ooijevaar	Koen Verweij
4	Wouter Olde Heuvel	Arjen van der Kieft
5	Ted-Jan Bloemen	Bob de Jong
6	Carl Verheijen	Sven Kramer
