= 2009 KNSB Dutch Single Distance Championships – Women's 1500 m =

- Venue: Thialf, Heerenveen
- Dates: 2 November 2008

The women's 1500 m at the 2009 KNSB Dutch Single Distance Championships in Heerenveen took place at Thialf on 2 November 2008. Although the championships were held in 2008 it is the 2009 edition as it was part of the 2008/2009 speed skating season. The top five speed skaters qualified for the 1500 m at the 2008–09 ISU Speed Skating World Cup. The title holder was Paulien van Deutekom.

== Results ==
=== Final results ===
Rank	Athlete	Time
1st place, gold medalist(s)	Paulien van Deutekom	1:58.16
2nd place, silver medalist(s)	Ireen Wüst	1:59.07
3rd place, bronze medalist(s)	Marrit Leenstra	1:59.43
4	Elma de Vries	1:59.61
5	Laurine van Riessen	1:59.72
6	Jorien Voorhuis	2:00.18
7	Lisette van der Geest	2:00.32 PR
8	Diane Valkenburg	2:00.99
9	Wieteke Cramer	2:01.30
10	Annette Gerritsen	2:01.69
11	Marije Joling	2:02.37 PR
12	Janneke Ensing	2:02.38 PR
13	Sanne Delfgou	2:02.50
14	Marit Dekker	2:02.77 PR
15	Linda Bouwens	2:02.79 PR
16	Tessa van Dijk	2:02.83
17	Margot Boer	2:03.19
18	Cindy Vergeer	2:03.22 PR
19	Linda de Vries	2:03.25 PR
20	Ingeborg Kroon	2:03.47
21	Tosca Hilbrands	2:03.50 PR
22	Lisanne Soemanta	2:05.42

Note:
PR = personal record

Source: KNSB.nl

=== Draw ===
Heat	Inner lane	Outer lane
1	Linda de Vries	Marit Dekker
2	Tosca Hilbrands	Marije Joling
3	Cindy Vergeer	Lisanne Soemanta
4	Margot Boer	Tessa van Dijk
5	Linda Bouwens	Lisette van der Geest
6	Elma de Vries	Janneke Ensing
7	Ingeborg Kroon	Wieteke Cramer
8	Diane Valkenburg	Jorien Voorhuis
9	Laurine van Riessen	Marrit Leenstra
10	Ireen Wüst	Annette Gerritsen
11	Sanne Delfgou	Paulien van Deutekom

Source: KNSB.nl
