= 2008 World Allround Speed Skating Championships =

International speed skating competition

World Allround Speed Skating Championships
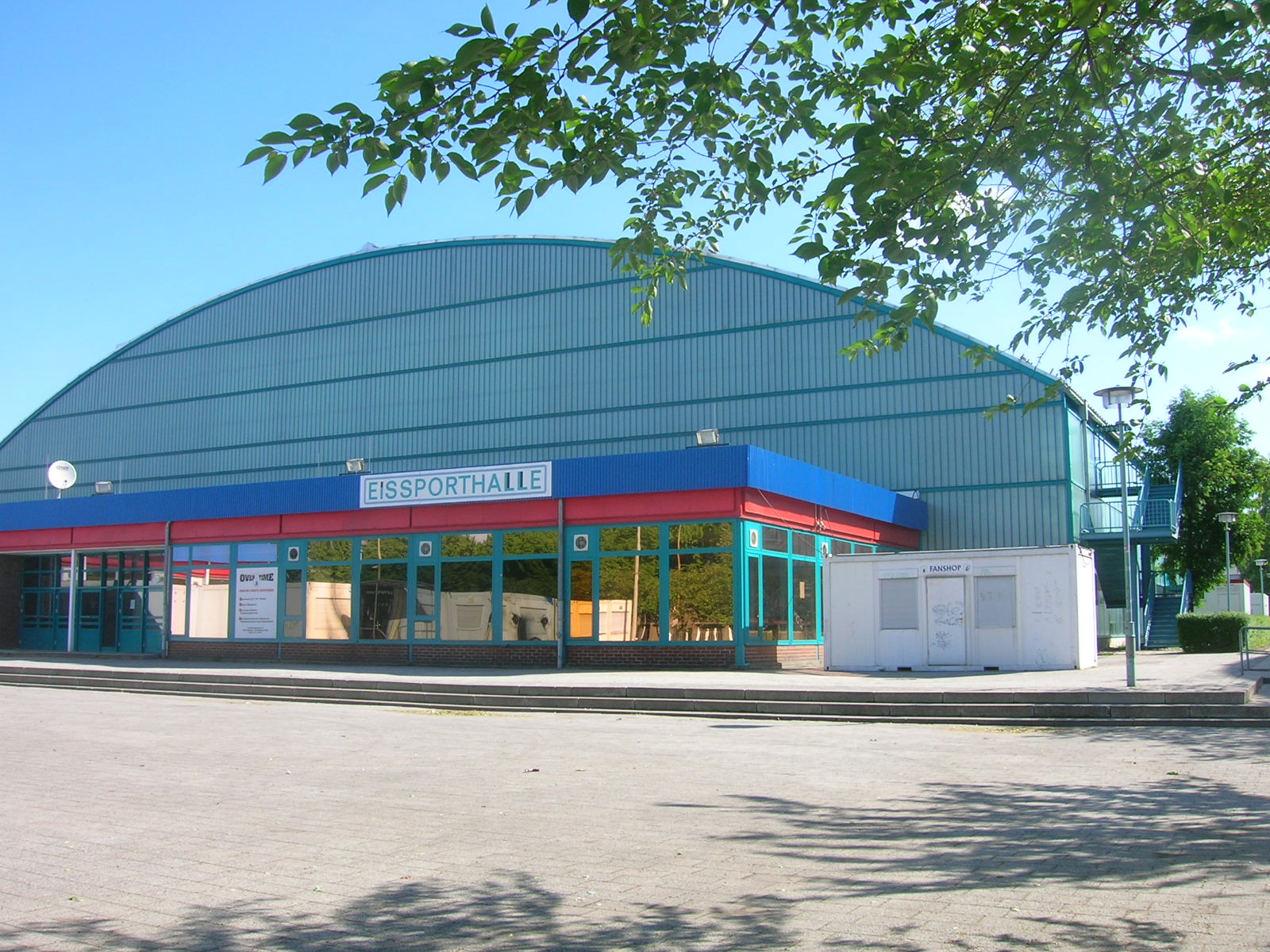
- Sportforum Hohenschönhausen (Berlin)
- Location: Berlin, Germany
- Venue: Sportforum Hohenschönhausen
- Dates: 9 and 10 February
- Competitors: 48

Medalist men
1st place, gold medalist(s)		Sven Kramer	NED
2nd place, silver medalist(s)		Håvard Bøkko	NOR
3rd place, bronze medalist(s)		Shani Davis	USA

Medalist women
1st place, gold medalist(s)		Paulien van Deutekom	NED
2nd place, silver medalist(s)		Ireen Wüst	NED
3rd place, bronze medalist(s)		Kristina Groves	CAN

The 2008 World Allround Speed Skating Championships were held in the indoor arena in Berlin, Germany, on 9 and 10 February 2008. The Dutch skaters Paulien van Deutekom and Sven Kramer became world champions.

== Women's championships ==
=== Day 1 ===
==== 500 metres ====
Place	Athlete	Country	Time
1st place, gold medalist(s)	Christine Nesbitt	Canada	39.03
2nd place, silver medalist(s)	Ireen Wüst	Netherlands	39.28
3rd place, bronze medalist(s)	Wang Fei	China	39.57
4	Kristina Groves	Canada	39.64
5	Paulien van Deutekom	Netherlands	39.65
6	Yekaterina Lobysheva	Russia	39.70
7	Marrit Leenstra	Netherlands	39.72
8	Daniela Anschütz-Thoms	Germany	39.98
9	Claudia Pechstein	Germany	40.01
9	Yekaterina Abramova	Russia	40.01

==== 3000 metres ====
Place	Athlete	Country	Time
1st place, gold medalist(s)	Paulien van Deutekom	Netherlands	4:03.33
2nd place, silver medalist(s)	Martina Sáblíková	Czech Republic	4:05.69
3rd place, bronze medalist(s)	Kristina Groves	Canada	4:06.36
4	Ireen Wüst	Netherlands	4:06.62
5	Christine Nesbitt	Canada	4:07.34
6	Diane Valkenburg	Netherlands	4:09.49
7	Clara Hughes	Canada	4:11.21
8	Daniela Anschütz-Thoms	Germany	4:11.43
9	Claudia Pechstein	Germany	4:12.09
10	Katrin Mattscherodt	Germany	4:12.98

=== Day 2 ===
==== 1500 metres ====
Place	Athlete	Country	Time
1st place, gold medalist(s)	Ireen Wüst	Netherlands	1:57.59
2nd place, silver medalist(s)	Paulien van Deutekom	Netherlands	1:57.83
3rd place, bronze medalist(s)	Christine Nesbitt	Canada	1:58.57
4	Kristina Groves	Canada	1:58.67
5	Wang Fei	China	1:59.31
6	Daniela Anschütz-Thoms	Germany	1:59.44
7	Marrit Leenstra	Netherlands	1:59.51
8	Martina Sáblíková	Czech Republic	1:59.62
9	Claudia Pechstein	Germany	1:59.77
10	Diane Valkenburg	Netherlands	1:59.82

==== 5000 metres ====
Place	Athlete	Country	Time
1st place, gold medalist(s)	Martina Sáblíková	Czech Republic	6:59.26 BR
2nd place, silver medalist(s)	Kristina Groves	Canada	7:06.22
3rd place, bronze medalist(s)	Paulien van Deutekom	Netherlands	7:07.10
4	Ireen Wüst	Netherlands	7:09.54
5	Clara Hughes	Canada	7:09.55
6	Claudia Pechstein	Germany	7:11.45
7	Daniela Anschütz-Thoms	Germany	7:11,88
8	Katrin Mattscherodt	Germany	7:15.61
9	Christine Nesbitt	Canada	7:15.92
10	Diane Valkenburg	Netherlands	7:18.25

=== Allround results ===
Place	Athlete	Country	500 m	3000 m	1500 m	5000 m	Points
1st place, gold medalist(s)	Paulien van Deutekom	Netherlands	39.65 (5)	4:03.33 (1)	1:57.83 (2)	7:07.10 (3)	162.191
2nd place, silver medalist(s)	Ireen Wüst	Netherlands	39.28 (2)	4:06.62 (4)	1:57.59 (1)	7;09.54 (4)	162.533
3rd place, bronze medalist(s)	Kristina Groves	Canada	39.64 (4)	4:06.36 (3)	1:58.67 (4)	7:06.22 (2)	162.878
4	Christine Nesbitt	Canada	39.03 (1)	4:07.34 (5)	1:58.57 (3)	7:15.92 (9)	163.368
5	Martina Sáblíková	Czech Republic	40.92 (15)	4:05.69 (2)	1:59.62 (8)	6:59.26 (1)	163.667
6	Daniela Anschütz-Thoms	Germany	39.98 (8)	4:11.43 (8)	1:59.44 (6)	7:11.88 (7)	164.886
7	Claudia Pechstein	Germany	40.01 (9)	4:12.09 (9)	1:59.77 (9)	7:11.45 (6)	165.093
8	Diane Valkenburg	Netherlands	40.28 (11)	4:09.49 (6)	1:59.82 (10)	7:18.25 (10)	165.626
9	Wang Fei	China	39.57 (3)	4:13.75 (11)	1:59.31 (5)	7:23.83 (11)	166.014
10	Katrin Mattscherodt	Germany	41.21 (20)	4:12.98 (10)	2:00.56 (12)	7:15.61 (8)	167.120
11	Clara Hughes	Canada	42.10 (22)	4:11.21 (7)	2:01.63 (15)	7:09.55 (5)	167.466
12	Marrit Leenstra	Netherlands	39.72 (7)	4:14.85 (12)	1:59.51 (7)	7:35.98 (12)	167.629
NQ13	Maki Tabata	Japan	40.48 (13)	4:15.44 (14)	2:00.70 (13)		123.286
NQ14	Yekaterina Lobysheva	Russia	39.70 (6)	4:19.92 (21)	2:01.45 (14)		123.503
NQ15	Brittany Schussler	Canada	40.75 (14)	4:16.93 (16)	2:00.11 (11)		123.607
NQ16	Galina Likhachova	Russia	40.45 (12)	4:18.00 (18)	2:02.23 (18)		124.193
NQ17	Katarzyna Wójcicka	Poland	40.93 (16)	4:17.47 (17)	2:02.03 (16)		124.517
NQ18	Mari Hemmer	Norway	41.07 (17)	4:15.11 (13)	2:03,05 (20)		124.604
NQ19	Yekaterina Abramova	Russia	40.01 (9)	4:22.54 (23)	2:03.77 (21)		125.022
NQ20	Lucille Opitz	Germany	41.19 (19)	4:18.10 (19)	2:02.47 (19)		125.029
NQ21	Lee Ju-youn	South Korea	41.14 (18)	4:19.67 (20)	2:02.19 (17)		125.148
NQ22	Catherine Raney	United States	41.74 (21)	4:15.87 (15)	2:04.72 (22)		125.958
NQ23	Eriko Ishino	Japan	42.10 (22)	4:21.14 (22)	2:05.53 (23)		127.466
NQ24	Anna Ringsred	United States	42.30 (24)	4:32.58 (24)	2:08.72 (24)		130.636

NQ = Not qualified for the 5000 m (only the best 12 are qualified)
DQ = disqualified

== Men's championships ==
=== Day 1 ===
==== 500 metres ====
Place	Athlete	Country	Time
1st place, gold medalist(s)	Denny Morrison	Canada	35.81
2nd place, silver medalist(s)	Shani Davis	United States	35.85
3rd place, bronze medalist(s)	Sven Kramer	Netherlands	36.22
4	Yevgeny Lalenkov	Russia	36.27
5	Håvard Bøkko	Norway	36.54
5	Ivan Skobrev	Russia	36.54
7	Chad Hedrick	United States	36.55
8	Konrad Niedźwiedzki	Poland	36.57
9	Steven Elm	Canada	36.70
10	Enrico Fabris	Italy	36.72

==== 5000 metres ====
Place	Athlete	Country	Time
1st place, gold medalist(s)	Sven Kramer	Netherlands	6:13.35
2nd place, silver medalist(s)	Håvard Bøkko	Norway	6:17.64
3rd place, bronze medalist(s)	Chad Hedrick	United States	6:18.90
4	Shani Davis	United States	6:23.92
5	Wouter olde Heuvel	Netherlands	6:25.06
6	Carl Verheijen	Netherlands	6:29.39
7	Sverre Haugli	Norway	6:29.64
8	Hiroki Hirako	Japan	6:33.17
9	Denny Morrison	Canada	6:33.53
10	Enrico Fabris	Italy	6:33.61

=== Day 2 ===
==== 1500 metres ====
Place	Athlete	Country	Time
1st place, gold medalist(s)	Shani Davis	United States	1:45.93
2nd place, silver medalist(s)	Denny Morrison	Canada	1:45.98
3rd place, bronze medalist(s)	Yevgeny Lalenkov	Russia	1:46.39
4	Sven Kramer	Netherlands	1:46.47
5	Chad Hedrick	United States	1:46.82
6	Wouter olde Heuvel	Netherlands	1:47.32
7	Håvard Bøkko	Norway	1:47.93
8	Enrico Fabris	Italy	1:48.12
9	Ben Jongejan	Netherlands	1:48.17
10	Lucas Makowsky	Canada	1:48.46

==== 10000 metres ====
Place	Athlete	Country	Time
1st place, gold medalist(s)	Sven Kramer	Netherlands	13:09.06 BR
2nd place, silver medalist(s)	Håvard Bøkko	Norway	13:10.87
3rd place, bronze medalist(s)	Wouter olde Heuvel	Netherlands	13:20.97
4	Carl Verheijen	Netherlands	13:23.86
5	Shani Davis	United States	13:27.13
6	Chad Hedrick	United States	13:32.69
7	Ivan Skobrev	Russia	13:37.72
8	Ben Jongejan	Netherlands	13:43.73
9	Enrico Fabris	Italy	13:45.23
10	Sverre Haugli	Norway	13:46.63

=== Allround results ===
Place	Athlete	Country	500 m	5000 m	1500 m	10.000 m	Points
1st place, gold medalist(s)	Sven Kramer	Netherlands	36.22 (3)	6:13.35 (1)	1:46.46 (4)	13:09.06 (1)	148.494
2nd place, silver medalist(s)	Håvard Bøkko	Norway	36.54 (5)	6:17.64 (2)	1:47.93 (7)	13:10.87 (2)	149.823
3rd place, bronze medalist(s)	Shani Davis	United States	35.85 (2)	6:23.92 (4)	1:45.93 (1)	13:27.13 (5)	149.908
4	Chad Hedrick	United States	36.55 (7)	6:18.90 (3)	1:46.82 (5)	13:32.69 (6)	150.680
5	Wouter olde Heuvel	Netherlands	36.98 (12)	6:25.07 (5)	1:47.32 (6)	13:20.97 (3)	151.308
6	Denny Morrison	Canada	35,81 (1)	6:33.53 (9)	1:45.98 (2)	14:11.76 (11)	153.077
7	Enrico Fabris	Italy	36.72 (10)	6:33.61 (10)	1:48.12 (8)	13:45.23 (9)	153.382
8	Ivan Skobrev	Russia	36.54 (5)	6:34.72 (11)	1:50.00 (19)	13:37.72 (7)	153.564
9	Carl Verheijen	Netherlands	38.07 (23)	6:29.39 (6)	1:49.23 (13)	13:23.86 (4)	153.612
10	Ben Jongejan	Netherlands	37.24 (14)	6:34.94 (12)	1:48.17 (9)	13:43.73 (8)	153.976
11	Sverre Haugli	Norway	37.83 (20)	6:29.64 (7)	1:49.31 (15)	13:46.63 (10)	154.561
12	Yevgeny Lalenkov	Russia	36.27 (4)	6:37.96 (15)	1:46.39 (3)	14:22.09 (12)	154.633
NQ13	Lucas Makowsky	Canada	36.85 (11)	6:37.30 (14)	1:48.46 (10)		112.733
NQ14	Tobias Schneider	Germany	37.27 (15)	6:36.32 (13)	1:48.96 (12)		113.222
NQ15	Henrik Christiansen	Norway	37.35 (16)	6:38.75 (16)	1:49.28 (14)		113.651
NQ16	Robert Lehmann	Germany	37.07 (13)	6:41.80 (17)	1:49.40 (16)		113.716
NQ17	Steven Elm	Canada	36.70 (9)	6:48.37 (21)	1:48.80 (11)		113.803
NQ18	Konrad Niedźwiedzki	Poland	36.57 (8)	6:47.83 (20)	1:49.69 (17)		113.916
NQ19	Hiroki Hirako	Japan	37.83 (20)	6:33.17 (8)	1:51.35 (21)		114.263
NQ20	Trevor Marsicano	United States	37.82 (19)	6:42.24 (18)	1:49.84 (18)		114.657
NQ21	Justin Warsylewicz	Canada	38.02 (22)	6:49.29 (22)	1:50.57 (20)		115.805
NQ22	Justin Stelly	United States	37.71 (18)	6:51.97 (23)	1:53.84 (23)		116.853
DQ1 -	Xingyu Song	China	DQ ()	6:45.94 (19)	1:53.29 (22)		
NQ24-	Kwun-Won Choi	South Korea	37.40 (17)	DNS			

NQ = Not qualified for the 10000 m (only the best 12 are qualified)
DQ = disqualified

== Rules ==
All 24 participating skaters are allowed to skate the first three distances; 12 skaters may take part on the fourth distance. These 12 skaters are determined by taking the standings on the longest of the first three distances, as well as the samalog standings after three distances, and comparing these lists as follows:

1. Skaters among the top 12 on both lists are qualified.
2. To make up a total of 12, skaters are then added in order of their best rank on either list. Samalog standings take precedence over the longest-distance standings in the event of a tie.
