= Sanne van der Star =

Dutch speed skater

Personal information
- Born: February 21, 1986 (age 40) Alkemade, Netherlands

Sport
- Country: Netherlands
- Sport: Speed skating

Achievements and titles
- Personal best: 2006 Winter Olympics

Sanne Martha van der Star (Alkemade, February 21, 1986) is a Dutch speed skater who is specialised in the short distances, over 500 and 1000 metres.

In December 2005 Van der Star tried to qualify herself for the 2006 Winter Olympics in Turin over 500 metres. As she was not among the nominated skaters for the distance a top-2 ranking was requested by the Dutch Speed Skating Association to qualify. Eventually Van der Star ended up on the third position behind Marianne Timmer and Annette Gerritsen. As the Dutch had four possible entries in the Olympics at this distance it was said that Van der Star had to show she was capable of getting high rankings in international races and it was requested that she would finish among the best 16 over 500 metres during the World Sprint Championships in 2006. After the first out of two races she was in 15th position and almost sure of qualification. In the second race however, she showed some nerves and had some instable moments during her race, resulting in a slower time compared to the day before. A few riders that were behind her the first day passed her in the ranking, however a few others fell behind on Van der Star and she ended up at exactly the 16th position in the end, which meant she qualified herself for the Olympics. In Turin she would do better than during the World Championships as her 39.26 in the first race and the 39.33 in the second race were good enough for her to reach the 14th position in the overall rankings. Her total time was 2.02 seconds short of the winner Svetlana Zhurova.
