= 2009 World Allround Speed Skating Championships =

International speed skating competition

World Allround Speed Skating Championships
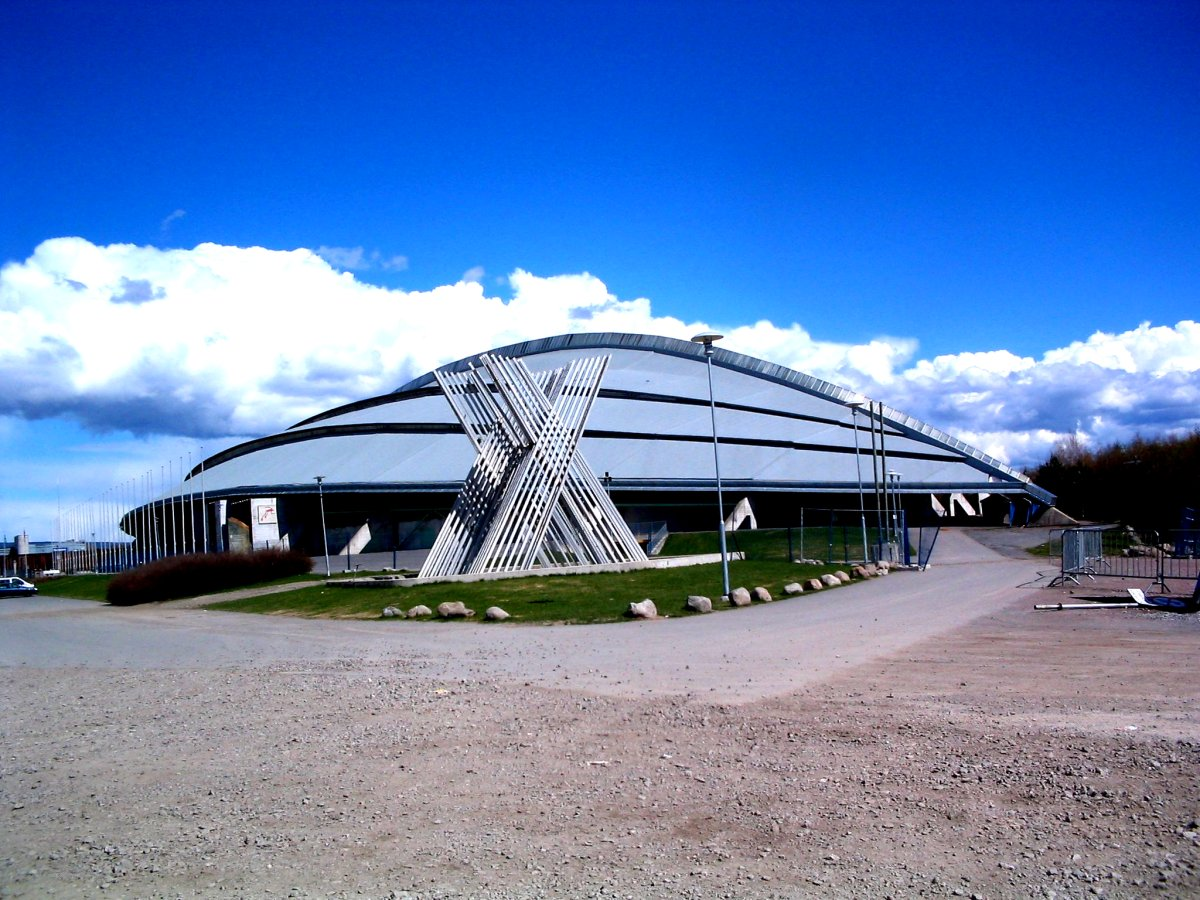
- Vikingskipet (Hamar)
- Location: Hamar (Norway
- Venue: Vikingskipet
- Dates: 7 and 8 February
- Competitors: 48

Medalist men
| 1st place, gold medalist(s) | | Sven Kramer | NED |
| 2nd place, silver medalist(s) | | Håvard Bøkko | NOR |
| 3rd place, bronze medalist(s) | | Enrico Fabris | ITA |

Medalist women
| 1st place, gold medalist(s) | | Martina Sáblíková | CZE |
| 2nd place, silver medalist(s) | | Kristina Groves | CAN |
| 3rd place, bronze medalist(s) | | Ireen Wüst | NED |

The 2009 World Allround Speed Skating Championships were held at the indoor ice rink of the Vikingskipet Olympic Arena in Hamar (Norway) on 7 and 8 February 2009.

The Czech Martina Sáblíková and the Dutch Sven Kramer became world champion.

Martina Sáblíková is the first Czech Allround champion.

Sven Kramer won for the third time. He also won the Dutch Allround and European Allround three times

Other skaters who also won the World Allround Championships three times are:

- Jaap Eden (1893,1895,1896)
- Oscar Mathisen (1912–1914)
- Michael Staksrud (1930,1935,1937)
- Hjalmar Andersen (1950–1952)
- Oleg Goncharenko (1953,1956,1958)
- Ard Schenk (1970–1972)
- Eric Heiden (1977–1979)
- Johann Olav Koss (1990,1991,1994)
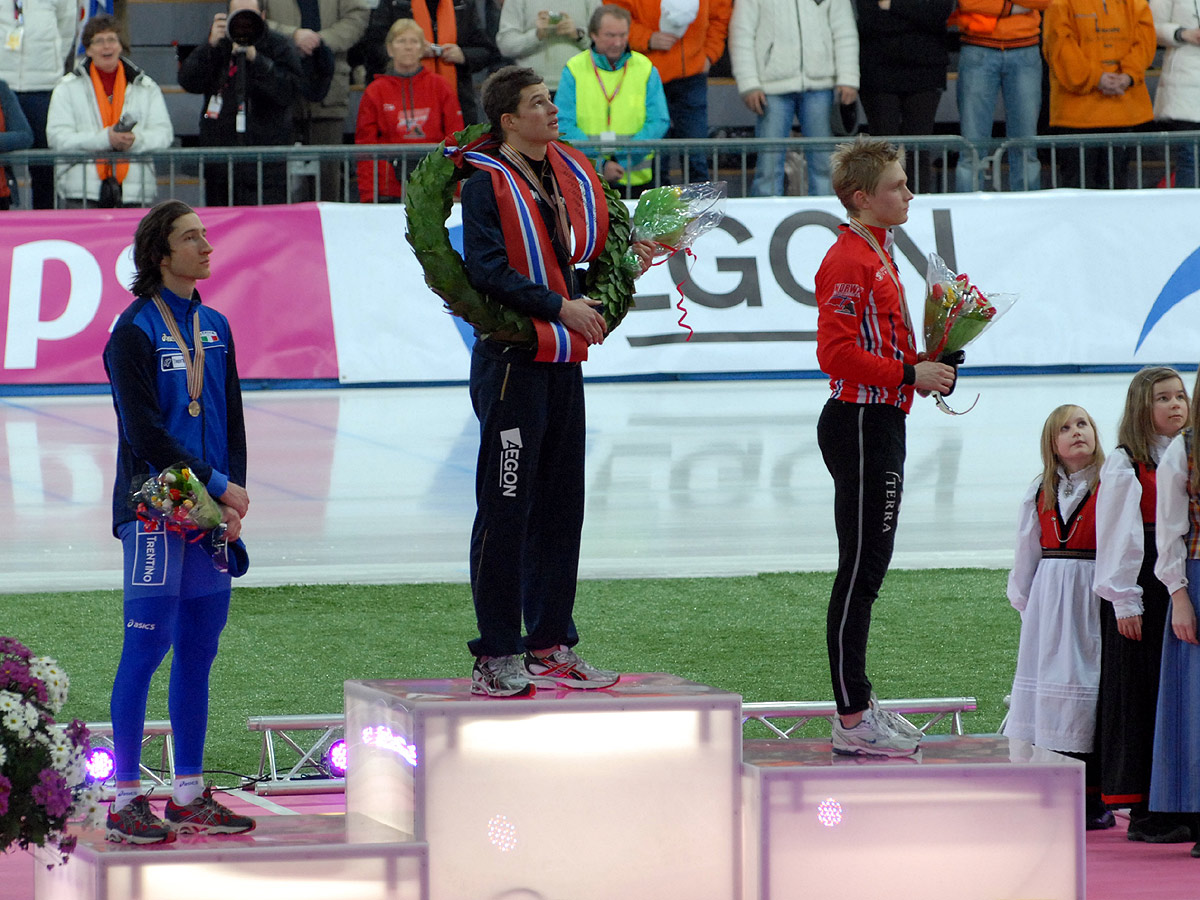
Enrico Fabris (bronze)
Sven Kramer (gold)
Håvard Bøkko (silver)

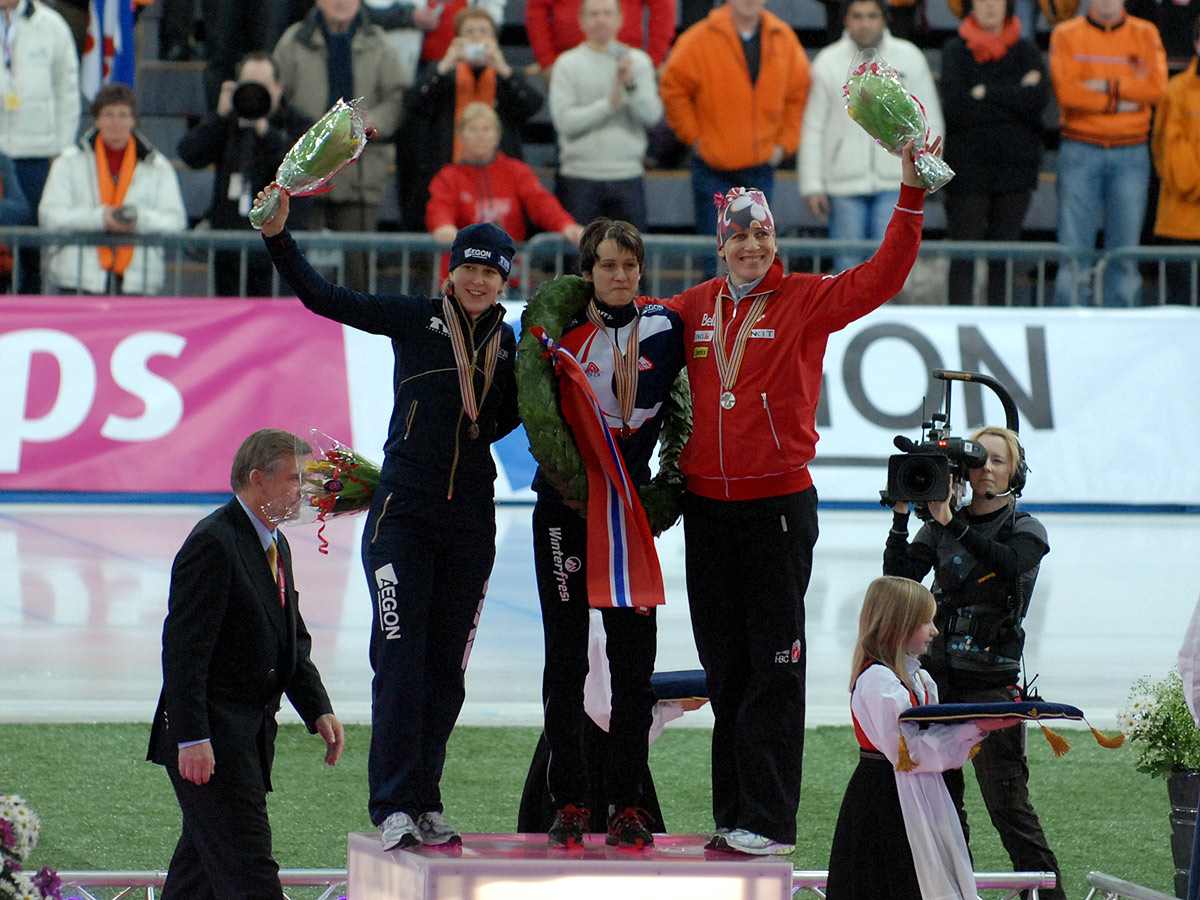
Ireen Wüst (bronze)
Martina Sáblíková (gold)
Kristina Groves (silver)

== Women's championships ==
=== Day 1 ===
==== 500 meter ====
| Place | Athlete | Country | Time |
|---|---|---|---|
| 1st place, gold medalist(s) | Christine Nesbitt | Canada | 38.87 |
| 2nd place, silver medalist(s) | Alla Shabanova | Russia | 39.53 |
| 3rd place, bronze medalist(s) | Ireen Wüst | Netherlands | 39.61 |
| 4 | Kristina Groves | Canada | 39.71 |
| 5 | Yekaterina Shikhova | Russia | 39.83 |
| 6 | Paulien van Deutekom | Netherlands | 39.99 |
| 7 | Brittany Schussler | Canada | 40.07 |
| 8 | Maki Tabata | Japan | 40.12 |
| 9 | Martina Sáblíková | Czech Republic | 40.28 NR |
| 10 | Renate Groenewold | Netherlands | 40.30 |

==== 3000 meter ====
| Place | Athlete | Country | Time |
|---|---|---|---|
| 1st place, gold medalist(s) | Martina Sáblíková | Czech Republic | 4:01.90 |
| 2nd place, silver medalist(s) | Renate Groenewold | Netherlands | 4:05.62 |
| 3rd place, bronze medalist(s) | Paulien van Deutekom | Netherlands | 4:05.88 |
| 4 | Kristina Groves | Canada | 4:06.24 |
| 5 | Jorien Voorhuis | Netherlands | 4:06.58 PB |
| 6 | Ireen Wüst | Netherlands | 4:07.98 |
| 7 | Masako Hozumi | Japan | 4:08.09 |
| 8 | Maren Haugli | Norway | 4:08.94 |
| 9 | Stephanie Beckert | Germany | 4:09.37 |
| 10 | Brittany Schussler | Canada | 4:09.94 |

=== Day 2 ===
==== 1500 meter ====
| Place | Athlete | Country | Time |
|---|---|---|---|
| 1st place, gold medalist(s) | Kristina Groves | Canada | 1:56.17 |
| 2nd place, silver medalist(s) | Christine Nesbitt | Canada | 1:56.49 |
| 3rd place, bronze medalist(s) | Ireen Wüst | Netherlands | 1:56.78 |
| 4 | Jorien Voorhuis | Netherlands | 1:57.62 |
| 5 | Masako Hozumi | Japan | 1:57.73 |
| 6 | Maki Tabata | Japan | 1:58.21 |
| 7 | Paulien van Deutekom | Netherlands | 1:58.29 |
| 8 | Martina Sáblíková | Czech Republic | 1:58.40 |
| 9 | Brittany Schussler | Canada | 1:58.56 |
| 10 | Katarzyna Wójcicka | Poland | 1:58.61 |

==== 5000 meter ====
| Place | Athlete | Country | Time |
|---|---|---|---|
| 1st place, gold medalist(s) | Martina Sáblíková | Czech Republic | 6:55.54 |
| 2nd place, silver medalist(s) | Masako Hozumi | Japan | 7:03.56 PB |
| 3rd place, bronze medalist(s) | Stephanie Beckert | Germany | 7:05.14 |
| 4 | Kristina Groves | Canada | 7:07.93 |
| 5 | Maren Haugli | Norway | 7:11.22 |
| 6 | Jorien Voorhuis | Netherlands | 7:14.39 |
| 7 | Renate Groenewold | Netherlands | 7:15.14 |
| 8 | Ireen Wüst | Netherlands | 7:17.73 |
| 9 | Brittany Schussler | Canada | 7:19.50 |
| 10 | Paulien van Deutekom | Netherlands | 7:21.63 |

=== Allround results ===
| Place | Athlete | Country | 500 m | 3000 m | 1500 m | 5000 m | Points |
|---|---|---|---|---|---|---|---|
| 1st place, gold medalist(s) | Martina Sáblíková | Czech Republic | 40.28 (9) | 4:01.90 (1) | 1:58.40 (8) | 6:55.54 (1) | 161.616 |
| 2nd place, silver medalist(s) | Kristina Groves | Canada | 39.71 (4) | 4:06.23 (4) | 1:56.17 (1) | 7:07.93 (4) | 162.264 |
| 3rd place, bronze medalist(s) | Ireen Wüst | Netherlands | 39.61 (3) | 4:07.98 (6) | 1:56.78 (3) | 7:17.73 (8) | 163.639 |
| 4 | Masako Hozumi | Japan | 40.89 (15) | 4:08.09 (7) | 1:57.73 (5) | 7:03.56 (2) | 163.837 |
| 5 | Jorien Voorhuis | Netherlands | 40.50 (12) | 4:06.58 (5) | 1:57.62 (4) | 7:14.39 (6) | 164.241 |
| 6 | Christine Nesbitt | Canada | 38.87 (1) | 4:10.81 (12) | 1:56.49 (2) | 7:27.45 (11) | 164.246 |
| 7 | Paulien van Deutekom | Netherlands | 39.99 (7) | 4:05.88 (3) | 1:58.29 (7) | 7:21.63 (10) | 164.563 |
| 8 | Renate Groenewold | Netherlands | 40.30 (10) | 4:05.58 (2) | 1:59.68 (14) | 7:15.13 (7) | 164.641 |
| 9 | Brittany Schussler | Canada | 40.07 (8) | 4:09.94 (10) | 1:58.56 (9) | 7:19.50 (9) | 165.196 |
| 10 | Maren Haugli | Norway | 41.36 (19) | 4:08.94 (8) | 1:59.43 (13) | 7:11.21 (5) | 165.781 |
| 11 | Alla Shabanova | Russia | 39.53 (2) | 4:17.08 (20) | 1:58.64 (11) | 7:39.88 (12) | 167.910 |
| 12 | Stephanie Beckert | Germany | 43.07 (23) | 4:09.37 (9) | 2:03.16 (22) | 7:05.13 (3) | 168.197 |
| NQ13 | Yekaterina Shikhova | Russia | 39.83 (6) | 4:16.47 (19) | 1:58.68 (12) | | 122.135 |
| NQ14 | Maki Tabata | Japan | 40.12 (8) | 4:15.93 (17) | 1:58.21 (6) | | 122.178 |
| NQ15 | Katarzyna Wójcicka | Poland | 40.49 (11) | 4:14.10 (14) | 1:58.61 (10) | | 122.376 |
| NQ16 | Maria Lamb | United States | 40.75 (13) | 4:14.97 (15) | 2:00.81 (16) | | 123.515 |
| NQ17 | Lucille Opitz | Germany | 40.77 (14) | 4:17.26 (21) | 2:01.05 (17) | | 123.996 |
| NQ18 | Nancy Swider-Peltz, Jr | United States | 41.69 (20) | 4:11. 43 (14) | 2:01.31 (19) | | 124.031 |
| NQ19 | Clara Hughes | Canada | 42.07 (22) | 4:10.71 (11) | 2:00.58 (15) | | 124.048 |
| NQ20 | Lee Ju-youn | South Korea | 40.98 (17) | 4:16.22 (18) | 2:01.18 (18) | | 124.076 |
| NQ21 | Eriko Ishino | Japan | 41.41 (20) | 4:15.20 (16) | 2:02.34 (21) | | 124.723 |
| NQ22 | Isabell Ost | Germany | 40.91 (16) | 4:21.44 (23) | 2:02.14 (20) | | 125.196 |
| NQ23 | Anna Rokita | Austria | 41.29 (18) | 4:19.19 (22) | 2:03.73 (23) | | 125.731 |
| DQ1 | Claudia Pechstein | Germany | DQ | DQ | NS | | DQ |

NQ = Not qualified for the 5000 m (only the best 12 are qualified)
DQ = Disqualified
NS = Not started

Notes

- On 1 July 2009, the ISU found Pechstein guilty of a violation of the anti-doping rules, and disqualified her from the competition. The decision is subject to an appeal at the Court of Arbitration for Sport. Pechstein skated the 500 metres in 39.74 seconds and the 3,000 metres in 4 minutes 6.00 seconds.

== Men's championships ==
=== Day 1 ===
==== 500 meter ====
| Place | Athlete | Country | Time |
|---|---|---|---|
| 1st place, gold medalist(s) | Denny Morrison | Canada | 35.55 |
| 2nd place, silver medalist(s) | Håvard Bøkko | Norway | 35.99 |
| 3rd place, bronze medalist(s) | Konrad Niedźwiedzki | Poland | 36.04 |
| 4 | Chad Hedrick | United States | 36.06 |
| 5 | Enrico Fabris | Italy | 36.21 |
| 6 | Sven Kramer | Netherlands | 36.33 |
| 7 | Brian Hansen | United States | 36.39 |
| 8 | Robert Lehmann | Germany | 36.46 |
| 9 | Trevor Marsicano | United States | 36.49 |
| 10 | Joel Eriksson | Sweden | 36.51 |

==== 5000 meter ====
| Place | Athlete | Country | Time |
|---|---|---|---|
| 1st place, gold medalist(s) | Sven Kramer | Netherlands | 6:09.74 BR |
| 2nd place, silver medalist(s) | Håvard Bøkko | Norway | 6:15.94 |
| 3rd place, bronze medalist(s) | Enrico Fabris | Italy | 6:20.32 |
| 4 | Wouter olde Heuvel | Netherlands | 6:22.60 |
| 5 | Sverre Haugli | Norway | 6:24.55 |
| 6 | Trevor Marsicano | United States | 6:24.90 PB |
| 7 | Ivan Skobrev | Russia | 6:25.29 |
| 8 | Carl Verheijen | Netherlands | 6:26.17 |
| 9 | Øystein Grødum | Norway | 6:30.01 |
| 10 | Chad Hedrick | United States | 6:30.44 |

=== Day 2 ===
==== 1500 meter ====
| Place | Athlete | Country | Time |
|---|---|---|---|
| 1st place, gold medalist(s) | Håvard Bøkko | Norway | 1:44.83 |
| 2nd place, silver medalist(s) | Sven Kramer | Netherlands | 1:45.01 |
| 3rd place, bronze medalist(s) | Trevor Marsicano | United States | 1:45.37 |
| 4 | Denny Morrison | Canada | 1:45.38 |
| 5 | Enrico Fabris | Italy | 1:45.59 |
| 6 | Chad Hedrick | United States | 1:45.67 |
| 7 | Wouter olde Heuvel | Netherlands | 1:46.44 |
| 8 | Konrad Niedźwiedzki | Poland | 1:46.45 |
| 9 | Lucas Makowsky | Canada | 1:47.28 |
| 10 | Robert Lehmann | Germany | 1:47.31 |

==== 10000 meter ====
| Place | Athlete | Country | Time |
|---|---|---|---|
| 1st place, gold medalist(s) | Sven Kramer | Netherlands | 13:05.21 BR |
| 2nd place, silver medalist(s) | Håvard Bøkko | Norway | 13:11.01 |
| 3rd place, bronze medalist(s) | Enrico Fabris | Italy | 13:20.65 |
| 4 | Wouter olde Heuvel | Netherlands | 13:24.93 |
| 5 | Carl Verheijen | Netherlands | 13:26.84 |
| 6 | Sverre Haugli | Norway | 13:35.64 |
| 7 | Ivan Skobrev | Russia | 13:36.08 |
| 8 | Trevor Marsicano | United States | 13:37.56 |
| 9 | Tom Prinsen | Netherlands | 13:39.94 |
| 10 | Chad Hedrick | United States | 13:46.27 |

=== Allround results ===
| Place | Athlete | Country | 500 m | 5000 m | 1500 m | 10000 m | Points |
|---|---|---|---|---|---|---|---|
| 1st place, gold medalist(s) | Sven Kramer | Netherlands | 36.33 (6) | 6:09.74 (1) | 1:45.01 (2) | 13:05.21 (1) | 147.567 |
| 2nd place, silver medalist(s) | Håvard Bøkko | Norway | 35.99 (2) | 6:15.94 (2) | 1:44.83 (1) | 13:11.01 (2) | 148.077 |
| 3rd place, bronze medalist(s) | Enrico Fabris | Italy | 36.21 (5) | 6:20.31 (3) | 1:45.59 (5) | 13:20.65 (3) | 149.469 |
| 4 | Wouter olde Heuvel | Netherlands | 36.65 (11) | 6:22.60 (4) | 1:46.44 (7) | 13:24.93 (4) | 150.636 |
| 5 | Trevor Marsicano | United States | 36.49 (9) | 6:24.89 (6) | 1:45.37 (3) | 13:37.56 (8) | 150.980 |
| 6 | Chad Hedrick | United States | 36.06 (4) | 6:30.43 (10) | 1:45.67 (6) | 13:46.27 (10) | 151.639 |
| 7 | Denny Morrison | Canada | 35.55 (1) | 6:33.09 (13) | 1:45.38 (4) | 14:04.61 (11) | 152.215 |
| 8 | Ivan Skobrev | Russia | 36.99 (14) | 6:25.29 (7) | 1:49.12 (17) | 13:36.08 (7) | 152.696 |
| 9 | Sverre Haugli | Norway | 37.57 (20) | 6:24.55 (5) | 1:48.25 (15) | 13:35.64 (6) | 152.890 |
| 10 | Tom Prinsen | Netherlands | 37.17 (17) | 6:31.18 (11) | 1:48.13 (14) | 13:39.94 (9) | 153.328 |
| 11 | Carl Verheijen | Netherlands | 38.78 (22) | 6:26.17 (8) | 1:47.82 (13) | 13:26.84 (5) | 153.679 |
| 12 | Konrad Niedźwiedzki | Poland | 36.04 (3) | 6:37.13 (17) | 1:46.45 (8) | 14:19.18 (12) | 154.195 |
| NQ13 | Robert Lehmann | Germany | 36.46 (8) | 6:35.19 (16) | 1:47.31 (10) | | 111.749 |
| NQ14 | Tobias Schneider | Germany | 37.12 (16) | 6:33.98 (14) | 1:47.48 (11) | | 112.344 |
| NQ15 | Steven Elm | Canada | 36.71 (12) | 6:39.33 (18) | 1:47.70 (12) | | 112.542 |
| NQ16 | Brian Hansen | United States | 36.39 (7) | 6:39.45 (19) | 1:48.64 (16) | | 112.548 |
| NQ17 | Lucas Makowsky | Canada | 37.34 (19) | 6:44.01 * (20) | 1:47.28 (9) | | 113.501 |
| NQ18 | Hiroki Hirako | Japan | 37.70 (17) | 6:32.89 (12) | 1:50.93 (21) | | 113.565 |
| NQ19 | Pascal Briand | France | 37.00 (15) | 6:46.67 (23) | 1:49.88 (19) | | 114.293 |
| NQ20 | Choi Kwun-won | South Korea | 36.87 (13) | 6:45.82 (22) | 1:50.77 (20) | | 114.375 |
| NQ21 | Øystein Grødum | Norway | 39.84 (23) | 6:30.01 (9) | 1:52.97 (22) | | 116.497 |
| NQ22 | Aleksandr Rumyantsev | Russia | 37.60 (21) | 6:44.04 (21) | 2:19.37 * (23) | | 124.460 |
| NQ23 | Johan Röjler | Sweden | 1:10.53 *(24) | 6:35.17 (15) | 1:49.19 (18) | | 146.443 |
| NQ24 | Joel Eriksson | Sweden | 36.51 (10) | 7:06.80 (24) | NS | | 79.190 |

NQ = Not qualified for the 10000 m (only the best 12 are qualified)
DQ = disqualified
NS = Not started
* Fall

== Rules ==
All 24 participating skaters are allowed to skate the first three distances; 12 skaters may take part on the fourth distance. These 12 skaters are determined by taking the standings on the longest of the first three distances, as well as the samalog standings after three distances, and comparing these lists as follows:

1. Skaters among the top 12 on both lists are qualified.
2. To make up a total of 12, skaters are then added in order of their best rank on either list. Samalog standings take precedence over the longest-distance standings in the event of a tie.

== See also ==
- Speed skating at the 2006 Winter Olympics
