= Carl Verheijen =

Dutch speed skater (born 1975)

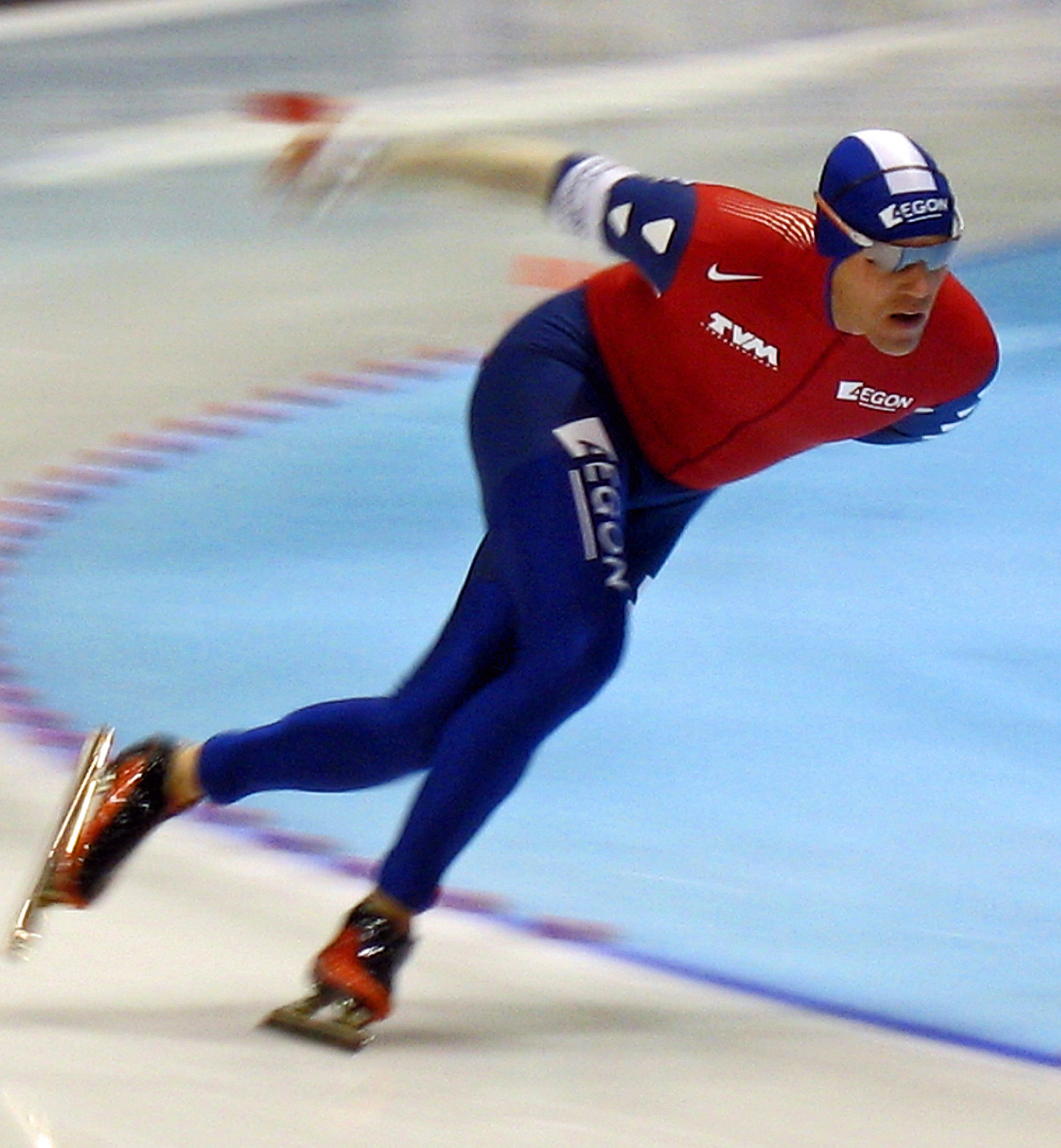

Personal information
- Born: 26 May 1975 (age 51) The Hague, Netherlands
- Height: 1.81 m (5 ft 11 in)
- Weight: 75 kg (165 lb)

Sport
- Country: Netherlands
- Sport: Speed skating

Achievements and titles
- Personal best(s): 500 m: 36:99 (2007); 1000 m: 1:11.92 (2006); 1500 m: 1:45.78 (2007); 5000 m: 6:08.98 (2005); 10 000 m: 12:55.30 (2007)
Medal record
Men's speed skating
Representing the Netherlands
Olympic Games
Bronze medal – third place	2006 Turin	Team pursuit
Bronze medal – third place	2006 Turin	10000 m
World Single Distance Championships
Gold medal – first place	2001 Salt Lake City	10000 m
Gold medal – first place	2004 Seoul	10000 m
Gold medal – first place	2005 Inzell	Team pursuit
Gold medal – first place	2007 Salt Lake City	Team pursuit
Gold medal – first place	2009 Vancouver	Team pursuit
Silver medal – second place	2001 Salt Lake City	5000 m
Silver medal – second place	2004 Seoul	5000 m
Silver medal – second place	2003 Berlin	10000 m
Silver medal – second place	2005 Inzell	10000 m
Silver medal – second place	2007 Salt Lake City	10000 m
Bronze medal – third place	2003 Berlin	5000 m
Bronze medal – third place	2005 Inzell	5000 m
Bronze medal – third place	2007 Salt Lake City	5000 m
World Allround Championships
Bronze medal – third place	2004 Hamar	Allround
Bronze medal – third place	2007 Heerenveen	Allround
European Championships
Silver medal – second place	2002 Erfurt	Allround
Silver medal – second place	2004 Heerenveen	Allround
Bronze medal – third place	2005 Heerenveen	Allround
Bronze medal – third place	2007 Collalbo	Allround

Carl Eduard Verheijen (born 26 May 1975) is a Dutch former speed skater who specialized in the longer distances 5,000 m and the 10,000 m. Verheijen is the son of international speed skaters Rieneke Demming and Eddy Verheijen. He is in a relationship with retired skater Andrea Nuyt in Leusden. They have a daughter (Manouk, August 2005). Carl's brother Frank Verheijen is a marathon skater.

He won two bronze medals at the 2006 Winter Olympics, in the 10000 m race and in the team pursuit. At the 2002 Winter Olympics, he placed 6th in the 5000 m event.

Verheijen was the top official of the Dutch team at the 2022 and 2026 Winter Olympics.

== Records ==
=== Personal records ===
Personal records
Men's Speed skating
Event	Result	Date	Location	Notes
500 meter	36.99	24 February 2007	Calgary	
1000 meter	1:11.92	16 December 2006	Heerenveen	
1500 meter	1:45.78	24 February 2007	Calgary	
3000 meter	3:39.52	5 November 2005	Calgary	
5000 meter	6:08.98	19 November 2005	Salt Lake City	
10000 meter	12:55.30	11 February 2007	Heerenveen	

Verheijen has a score of 147.913 points on the Adelskalender

=== World records ===
Nr.	Event	Result	Date	Location	Notes
1.	Small combination	153.767	21 March 1998	Calgary	World record until 16 August 1998
2.	Team pursuit	3:46.44*	21 November 2004	Berlin	World record until 12 November 2005
3.	10000 meter	12:57.92	4 December 2005	Heerenveen	World record until 31 December 2005
4.	Team pursuit	3:37.80**	11 March 2007	Salt Lake City	World record until 9 November 2013

* together with Erben Wennemars and Mark Tuitert
** together with Erben Wennemars and Sven Kramer

=== World records at a low altitude rink (unofficial) ===
Nr.	Event	Result	Date	Location	Notes
1.	3000 meter	3:47.10	16 November 2002	Erfurt	World record until 21 November 2003
2.	10000 meter	12:57.92	4 December 2005	Heerenveen	World record until 9 February 2007

== Tournament overview ==
Season	Dutch Championships Sprint	Dutch Championships Single Distances	Dutch Championships Allround	European Championships Allround	World Championships Allround	World Championships Single Distances	Olympic Games	World Cup GWC
1994–95		THE HAGUE 11th 5000m 10th 10000m	ASSEN 22nd 500m 10th 5000m 20th 1500m DNQ 10000m NC overall(17th)					
1995–96		GRONINGEN 4th 5000m (bronze) 10000m	THE HAGUE 18th 500m (bronze) 5000m 8th 1500m 8th 10000m 9th overall					
1996–97			ASSEN 23rd 500m 6th 5000m 10th 1500m 5th 10000m 8th overall					29th 5000/10000m
1997–98		HEERENVEEN 13th 1500m 4th 5000m 7th 10000m	DEVENTER 14th 500m (bronze) 5000m 5th 1500m (gold) 10000m (silver) overall					
1998–99		GRONINGEN 11th 1500m (bronze) 5000m (bronze) 10000m	THE HAGUE 20th 500m 7th 5000m DNS 1500m DNS 1000m NC overall			HEERENVEEN 11th 10000m		11th 5000/10000m
1999–2000		DEVENTER (silver) 5000m 4th 10000m	THE HAGUE 19th 500m 5th 5000m 9th 1500m 9th 10000m 10th overall			NAGANO 11th 10000m		23rd 5000/10000m
2000–01		THE HAGUE 5th 5000m (gold) 10000m	HEERENVEEN 11th 500m 4th 5000m (bronze) 1500m (gold) 10000m 5th overall			SALT LAKE CITY (silver) 5000m (gold) 10000m		(silver) 5000/10000m
2001–02		GRONINGEN DNF 1500m 4th 5000m		ERFURT 18th 500m (gold) 5000m 4th 1500m (bronze) 10000m (silver) overall	HEERENVEEN 18th 500m (bronze) 5000m 11th 500m (silver) 10000m 4th overall		SALT LAKE CITY 6th 5000m	(bronze) 5000/10000m
2002–03		UTRECHT (silver) 5000m (bronze) 10000m	ASSEN 15th 500m 5th 5000m (bronze) 1500m 5th 10000m 5th overall			BERLIN (bronze) 5000m (silver) 10000m		45th 1500m (gold) 5000/10000m
2003–04		HEERENVEEN 5th 1500m (gold) 5000m (silver) 10000m	EINDHOVEN 12th 500m (bronze) 5000m 6th 1500m (silver) 10000m (silver) overall	HEERENVEEN 10th 500m (gold) 5000m (bronze) 1500m (gold) 10000m (silver) overall	HAMAR 19th 500m (gold) 5000m 4th 1500m (gold) 10000m (bronze) overall	SEOUL (silver) 5000m (gold) 10000m		4th 1500m (silver) 5000/10000m
2004–05	GRONINGEN 20th 500m 11th 1000m 20th 500m 11th 1000m 15th overall	ASSEN 4th 1500m (silver) 5000m	HEERENVEEN 11th 500m (gold) 5000m 6th 1500m (bronze) 10000m (silver) overall	HEERENVEEN 12th 500m (silver) 5000m (bronze) 1500m (bronze) 10000m (bronze) overall	MOSCOW 13th 500m 4th 5000m 9th 1500m (silver) 10000m 4th overall	INZELL (bronze) 5000m (silver) 10000m (gold) team pursuit		15th 1500m 4th 5000/10000m
2005–06		HEERENVEEN 10th 1500m (gold) 5000m (gold) 10000m		HAMAR 20th 500m 9th 5000m 11th 1500m 8th 10000m 9th overall			TURIN 4th 5000m (bronze) 10000m (bronze) team pursuit	(bronze) 5000/10000m
2006–07		ASSEN 12th 1000m 5th 1500m (silver) 5000m (silver) 10000m	HEERENVEEN 12th 500m (silver) 5000m 5th 1500m (gold) 10000m (silver) overall	COLLALBO 12th 500m (silver) 5000m 9th 1500m (silver) 10000m (bronze) overall	HEERENVEEN 15th 500m (silver) 5000m 5th 1500m (silver) 10000m (bronze) overall	SALT LAKE CITY (bronze) 5000m (silver) 10000m (gold) team pursuit		26th 1500m (silver) 5000/10000m (gold) team pursuit
2007–08		HEERENVEEN (silver) 5000m	GRONINGEN 24th 500m 4th 5000m 12th 1500m (bronze) 10000m 7th overall		BERLIN 23rd 500m 6th 5000m 13th 1500m 4th 10000m 9th overall	NAGANO 4th 5000m		7th 5000/10000m (gold) team pursuit
2008–09		HEERENVEEN (silver) 5000m (silver) 10000m	HEERENVEEN 19th 500m 4th 5000m 7th 1500m (bronze) 10000m (bronze) overall	HEERENVEEN 19th 500m 5th 5000m 10th 1500m (bronze) 10000m 5th overall	HAMAR 22nd 500m 8th 5000m 13th 1500m 5th 10000m 11th overall	RICHMOND 7th 5000m 4th 10000m (gold) team pursuit		4th 5000/10000m 7th team pursuit
2009–10		HEERENVEEN 12th 1500m 5th 5000m (bronze) 10000m						5th 5000/10000m (silver) team pursuit

== Medals won ==
Championship	Gold (gold)	Silver (silver)	Bronze (bronze)
Dutch Single Distances	4	9	4
Dutch Allround	0	4	1
European Allround	0	2	2
World Single Distances	5	5	3
World Allround	0	0	2
Olympic Games	0	0	2

== Best results ==
- 2007
  - Silver medal 10000 m world single distance championships in Salt Lake City
  - Bronze medal 5000 m world single distance championships in Salt Lake City
  - Bronze medal World Allround Championships in Heerenveen
  - Bronze medal European Allround Championships in Collalbo
  - Silver medal Dutch allround championships in Heerenveen
  - Silver medal 5000 m Dutch single distance championships in Assen
  - Silver medal 10000 m Dutch single distance championships in Assen
- 2006
  - Bronze medal 10000 m 2006 Winter Olympics
  - Bronze medal team pursuit 2006 Winter Olympics
  - Dutch champion 5000 m in Heerenveen
  - Dutch champion 10000 m in Heerenveen
- 2005
  - Gold medal team pursuit World Single Distance Championships in Inzell together with Erben Wennemars and Mark Tuitert
  - Silver medal 10000 m world single distance championships in Inzell
  - Bronze medal 5000 m world single distance championships in Inzell
  - Silver medal Dutch allround championships in Heerenveen
- 2004
  - Gold medal 10000 m world single distance championships in Seoul
  - Silver medal 5000 m world single distance championships in Seoul
  - Bronze medal World Allround Championships in Hamar
  - Silver medal European Allround Championships in Heerenveen
  - Dutch champion 5000 m in Heerenveen
  - Silver medal Dutch allround championships in Eindhoven
- 2003
  - Gold medal 5000 m Dutch single distance championships in Heerenveen
  - World Cup long distance winner
  - Silver medal 10000 m Dutch single distance championships in Heerenveen
  - Silver medal 10000 m world single distance championships in Berlin
  - Bronze medal 5000 m world single distance championships in Berlin
- 2002
  - Silver medal European Allround Championships in Erfurt
- 2001
  - Gold medal 10000 m Dutch single distance championships in The Hague
  - Silver medal 5000 m world single distance championships in Salt Lake City
  - Gold medal 10000 m world single distance championships in Salt Lake City
- 2000
  - Silver medal 5000 m Dutch single distance championships in Deventer
- 1999
  - Bronze medal 5000 m Dutch single distance championships in Groningen
  - Bronze medal 10000 m Dutch single distance championships in Groningen
- 1998
  - Silver medal Dutch allround championships in Groningen
- 1996
  - Bronze medal 10000 m Dutch single distance championships in Groningen
