= Marja Vis =

Dutch speed skater

Personal information
- Born: 15 January 1977 (age 49) Hoorn, the Netherlands

Sport
- Sport: Speed skating
- Club: Hardrijdersclub De IJsleeuwen
Medal record
Dutch Allround championships
Gold medal – first place	2002 Alkmaar	Allround

Maria Margaretha Antje "Marja" Vis (born 15 January 1977) is a retired speed skater from the Netherlands who was active between 1996 and 2010. She competed at the 2002 Winter Olympics in the 5000 metres competition and finished in 13th place.

== Results ==
Year	NC Distances	NC Allround	EC Allround	WC Allround	WC Distances
1996	8th 1500m 9th 3000m 7th 5000m				
1997	4th 1500m 3000m 5000m				
1998	10th 3000m 9th 5000m	8th			
1999	9th 1000m 11th 1500m 9th 3000m 10th 5000m	4th			
2000	3000m 5000m	6th			
2001	5th 3000m 5000m	6th			
2002	3000m 5000m		6th	9th	
2003	4th 1500m 7th 3000m 5th 5000m		6th	10th	14th 3000m
2004	1500m 5th 3000m 8th 5000m	5th			
2005	8th 1500m 4th 3000m 4th 5000m	8th			
2006	13th 1500m 10th 3000m 8th 5000m				
2007	6th 1500m 4th 3000m 4th 5000m		6th	10th	7th 1500m 6th 5000m
2008	19th 3000m				
2009	9th 3000m 6th 5000m				
2010	14th 3000m 8th 5000m				

Personal bests:

- 500 m – 39.86 (2002)
- 1000 m – 1:17.54 (2007)
- 1500 m – 1:55.99 (2007)
- 3000 m – 4:04.49 (2007)
- 5000 m – 7:02.51 (2007)
