= Paulien van Deutekom =

Dutch speed skater (1981–2019)

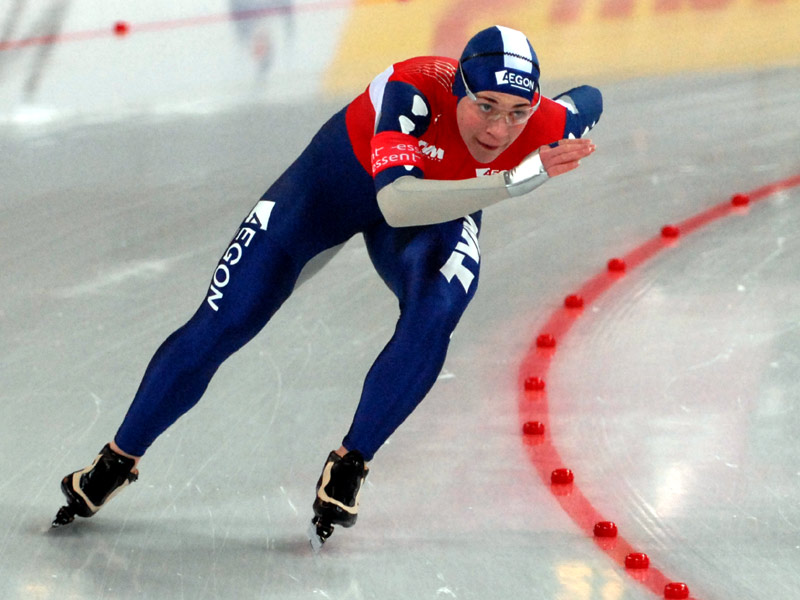
- Paulien van Deutekom

Personal information
- Born: Paulien van Deutekom; 4 February 1981 The Hague, Netherlands
- Died: 2 January 2019 (aged 37) Netherlands

Sport
- Country: Netherlands
- Sport: Speed skating
- Turned pro: 1998
- Retired: 2012
Medal record
Women's Speed Skating
Representing the Netherlands
World Allround Championships
Gold medal – first place	2008 Berlin	Allround
World Single Distance Championships
Gold medal – first place	2008 Nagano	Team pursuit
Silver medal – second place	2008 Nagano	1500 m
Silver medal – second place	2008 Nagano	3000 m
Silver medal – second place	2007 Salt Lake City	Team pursuit

Paulien van Deutekom (4 February 1981 – 2 January 2019) was a Dutch champion speed skater who specialised in the middle to long distances, over 1000 and 1500 metres.

== Biography ==
In November 2005, Van Deutekom surprised when she skated among the best at the Speed Skating World Cup qualification tournament at several distances and as a result qualified for those World Cups. During her first ever World Cup event in the Olympic Oval in Calgary she skated a new Dutch record over 1500 metres, with a time of 1:55.43, overtaking the previous record by Annamarie Thomas. Her record was broken a week later by Ireen Wüst with a time of 1:54.93.

Later, in December 2005 she participated at the 2005 Dutch Single Distance Championships, which was also the Olympic Qualification tournament. At the 1500 metres distance she finished in second position and qualified for the 2006 Winter Olympics. She also had chances over 1000 metres, however only finished in fourth position and did not directly qualify. A skate-off between her and Barbara de Loor settled the contest for the slot in De Loor's favour. She was selected for the pursuit team. At the Olympics Van Deutekom finished 13th over 1500 metres, while the pursuit team was eliminated at an early stage.

In the European Championships Allround in January 2008 she came second after her teammate Ireen Wüst. In February 2008 Van Deutekom won the World Allround Speed Skating Championships in Berlin. In March 2008 Van Deutekom finished second at the World Single Distance Championships in Nagano in the 1500 metres and the 3000 metres. In March 2012 after the 1500 metre event at the World Cup in Heerenveen, Van Deutekom announced that she was ending her skating career.

== Post skating career ==
Following her retirement van Deutekom was a pundit for Dutch broadcaster NOS. Van Deutekom died on 2 January 2019 after being diagnosed with lung cancer six months earlier at the age of 37. Van Deutekom is survived by her husband Kay van der Kooi and daughter Lynn, born in 2017.

== Personal records ==
Personal records
Speed skating
Event	Result	Date	Location	Notes
500m	39.40	12 January 2008	Kolomna	
1000m	1:15.70	2 March 2007	Calgary	
1500m	1:54.44	17 November 2007	Calgary	
3000m	3:59.18	4 March 2007	Calgary	
5000m	7:02.40	13 January 2008	Kolomna	
10000m	15:43.17	23 March 2001	Heerenveen	

Source: SpeedskatingResults.com & speedskatingbase.eu

== Tournament overview ==
Season	Dutch Championships Single Distances	Dutch Championships Sprint	Dutch Championships Allround	European Championships Allround	World Championships Allround	World Championships Sprint	World Championships Single Distances	Olympic Games	World Cup
1998–99	GRONINGEN 15th 3000m								
1999–2000	DEVENTER 11th 1500m 10th 3000m								
2000–01		HEERENVEEN 16th 500m 15th 1000m 15th 500m 15th 1000m 15th overall							
2001–02	GRONINGEN 16th 1000m 16th 1500m 11th 3000m 6th 5000m	GRONINGEN 17th 500m 18th 1000m 17th 500m 17th 1000m 16th overall	ALKMAAR 14th 500m 10th 3000m 13th 1500m DNQ 5000m NC overall						
2002–03	UTRECHT 12th 3000m		ASSEN 17th 500m 14th 3000m 14th 1500m DNQ 5000m NC overall						
2003–04	HEERENVEEN 14th 1500m 17th 3000m		EINDHOVEN 14th 500m 11th 3000m 15th 1500m DNQ 5000m NC overall						
2004–05	ASSEN 13th 500m 8th 1000m 15th 1500m 14th 3000m	GRONINGEN 12th 500m 11th 1000m 14th 500m 9th 1000m 12th overall	HEERENVEEN 6th 500m 12th 3000m 13th 1500m DNQ 5000m NC overall						
2005–06	HEERENVEEN 4th 1000m (silver) 1500m	ASSEN 7th 500m 4th 1000m 12th 500m (bronze) 1000m 9th overall						TORINO 13th 1500m 6th Team pursuit	11th 1000m 6th 1500m
2006–07	ASSEN 4th 1000m (bronze) 1500m (bronze) 3000m		HEERENVEEN (bronze) 500m 4th 3000m (bronze) 1500m 6th 5000m 4th overall	COLLALBO 5th 500m 4th 3000m 10th 1500m 10th 5000m 7th overall	HEERENVEEN 11th 500m 5th 3000m 4th 1500m 7th 5000m 6th overall		SALT LAKE CITY 5th 1500m 6th 3000m (silver) team pursuit		25th 1000m 6th 1500m 9th 3/5 km (gold) team pursuit
2007–08	HEERENVEEN (gold) 1000m (gold) 1500m (bronze) 3000m	HEERENVEEN 8th 500m (silver) 1000m 7th 500m (silver) 1000m 4th overall	GRONINGEN 5th 500m (bronze) 3000m (silver) 1500m (bronze) 5000m (bronze) overall	KOLOMNA (bronze) 500m (bronze) 3000m (silver) 1500m (bronze) 5000m (silver) overall	BERLIN 5th 500m (gold) 3000m (silver) 1500m (bronze) 5000m (gold) overall	HEERENVEEN 21st 500m 4th 1000m 19th 500m 8th 1000m 12th overall	NAGANO 5th 1000m (silver) 1500m (silver) 3000m 8th 5000m (gold) team pursuit		9th 1000m 4th 1500m 13th 3/5 km 6th team pursuit
2008–09	HEERENVEEN 7th 500m (gold) 1000m (gold) 1500m (silver) 3000m	GRONINGEN 8th 500m (gold) 1000m 12th 500m (bronze) 1000m 5th overall	HEERENVEEN 5th 500m (silver) 3000m 5th 1500m (bronze) 5000m (bronze) overall	HEERENVEEN 4th 500m (bronze) 3000m (bronze) 1500m 7th 5000m 4th overall	HAMAR 7th 500m (bronze) 3000m 7th 1500m 10th 5000m 7th overall				29th 1000m 24th 1500m 22nd 3/5 km
2009–10	HEERENVEEN 13th 1000m 9th 3000m			HAMAR 6th 500m 9th 3000m 16th 1500m 9th 5000m 12th overall					35th 1500m 39th 3/5 km 5th team pursuit
2010–11			HEERENVEEN 6th 500m 7th 3000m 7th 1500m 10th 5000m 10th overall						
2011–12	HEERENVEEN 12th 1000m 15th 1500m 13th 3000m		HEERENVEEN 9th 500m 14th 3000m 13th 1500m DNQ 5000m NC overall						

- NC = No classification due to not qualifying for the last distance

Awards
Preceded by Ireen Wüst	Ard Schenk Award; 2008	Succeeded by Margot Boer
