= Yuri Solinger =

Dutch speed skater (born 1979)

Personal information
- Born: 19 August 1979 (age 47) Vierhuizen, Groningen, Netherlands
- Years active: 1998-2009

Sport
- Sport: Speed skating
- Events: 1000 m; 1500 m

Yuri Solinger (born 19 August 1979) is a Dutch former long-track skater and general manager of iSkate.

== Biography ==
Solinger specialized in the 1000- and 1500-metre distances. He began his speed skating career with the Jong Oranje (Dutch junior national) team. In 1999, Solinger finished second at the World Junior Speed Skating Championships in Åmot/Geithus, Norway, behind world champion Mark Tuitert. He also placed second in the 3000 metres, once again finishing behind Tuitert. Subsequently, Solinger sought to break into the élite ranks of speed skating; he came closest to doing so at the 2002 Dutch All-round Championships in Alkmaar, where he finished just off the podium. In 2004, Solinger placed second at the Eindhoven Trofee, behind Jan Bos.

Until the 2006/2007 season, he skated for the Dutch team TVM. Afterwards, Solinger established his own team, which later became known as APPM. Following his retirement from skating, he stayed on as that team's manager. In 2010, he founded iSkate, into which APPM was subsequently incorporated. Today, the sprint team Team Beslist.nl, led by Gerard van Velde, and Team AfterPay, led by Dennis van der Gun, are both among iSkate's organizations. Since beslist.nl withdrew from iSkate, Solinger has been in talks with Team Plantina about a new sprint collective.

== Personal bests ==
Distance	Time	Date	Track
500 m	36.06	17 March 2007	(Canada) Calgary
1000 m	1:09.72	17 March 2007	(Canada) Calgary
1500 m	1:46.50	20 March 2003	(Canada) Calgary
3000 m	3:47.53	21 March 2002	(Canada) Calgary
5000 m	6:32.62	19 March 2003	(Canada) Calgary
10 000 m	14:01.14	17 March 2000	(Canada) Calgary

== Results ==
Year	NK Distance	NK All-round	NK Sprint	World Cup	WK Juniors
1998	19th 1000 m	13th			
1999	13th 500 m	10th			2nd place, silver medalist(s)
2000	15th 1500 m; 11th 5000 m; 8th 10 000 m	16th	14th		
2001	13th 1000 m; 14th 1500 m; 11th 5000 m; 7th 10 000 m	11th			
2002	8th 1000 m; 5th 1500 m; 17th 5000 m	4th	8th	49th 1500 m	
2003	8th 1000 m; 15th 1500 m; 13th 5000 m; 8th 10 000 m	9th	10th		
2004	10th 500 m; 12th 1000 m; 11th 1500 m	13th	9th		
2005	7th 500 m; 9th 1000 m; 11th 1500 m		6th	21st 100 m; 42nd 500 m; 35th 1000 m	
2006	8th 500 m; 11th 1000 m; 16th 1500 m				
2007	19th 500 m; 13th 1000 m; 11th 1500 m	17th	13th		
2008	18th 500 m; 11th 1000 m; 16th 1500 m		17th		
2009	16th 1000 m; 17th 1500 m				

=== Medal table ===
Championship	Gold	Silver	Bronze
WK Juniors	0	1	0
