= Helen van Goozen =

Dutch speed skater

Helen Tuitert-van Goozen
Personal information
- Born: 25 December 1980 (age 45) Hoogmade, Netherlands

Sport
- Country: Netherlands
- Sport: Speed skating

Helen Tuitert-van Goozen (born 25 December 1980, in Hoogmade), is a former Dutch speed skater. She is married to fellow speed skater and Olympic speed skating champion Mark Tuitert.

Van Goozen won gold at the World Junior Speed Skating Championships in 1999. Her future husband Mark also won gold at the same tournament.

She won the 1500m and 3000m at the Nordic Neo Senior Games in 2002.
