= Berden de Vries =

Dutch cyclist and speed skater

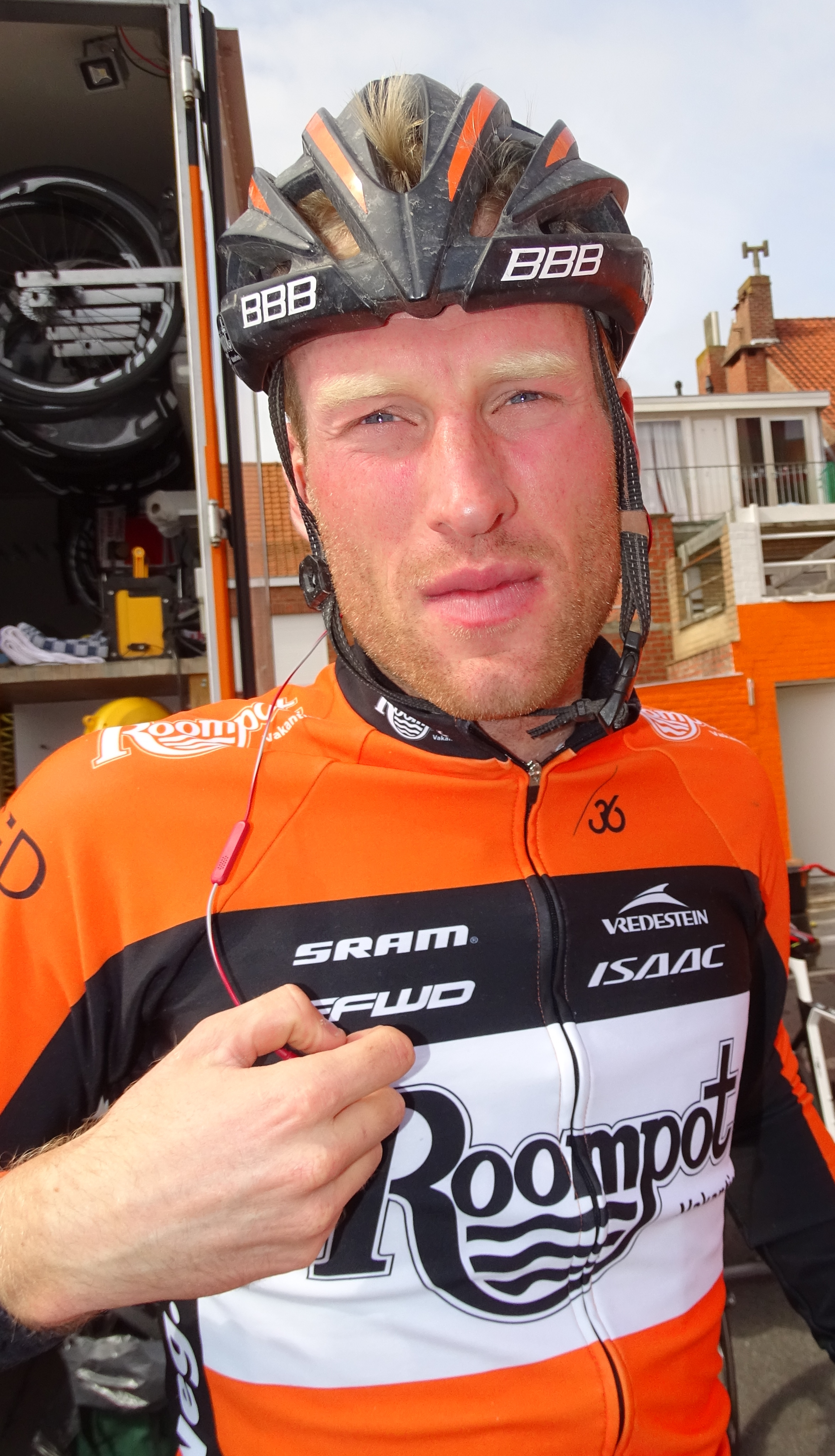
- De Vries in 2015

Personal information
- Full name: Berden de Vries
- Born: 10 March 1989 (age 37) Gieterveen, Netherlands
- Height: 1.86 m (6 ft 1 in)
- Weight: 70 kg (154 lb)

Cycling career
- Sport: Cycling
- Current team: Retired
- Discipline: Road
- Role: Rider

Amateur team
- 2012: Ruiter Dakkapellen-Wielerteam

Professional teams
- 2013–2014: Cycling Team Jo Piels
- 2015–2017: Team Roompot

Berden de Vries (born 10 March 1989) is a Dutch former racing cyclist and speed skater. In 2008 he earned a bronze medal at the World Junior Speed Skating Championships at Changchun, behind fellow Dutchmen Jan Blokhuijsen and Koen Verweij. He rode at the 2013 UCI Road World Championships.

== Major results ==
2010
10th Overall Tour de Berlin
2012
9th Overall Tour du Loir-et-Cher
2013
2nd Overall Boucle de l'Artois
4th Zuid Oost Drenthe Classic II
10th Overall Tour du Loir-et-Cher
2014
1st Overall Olympia's Tour

1st Stages 1 & 2 (TTT)

6th Arnhem–Veenendaal Classic
8th Dwars door Drenthe
10th Arno Wallaard Memorial
2015
10th Tro-Bro Léon
