= Wieteke Cramer =

Dutch speed skater

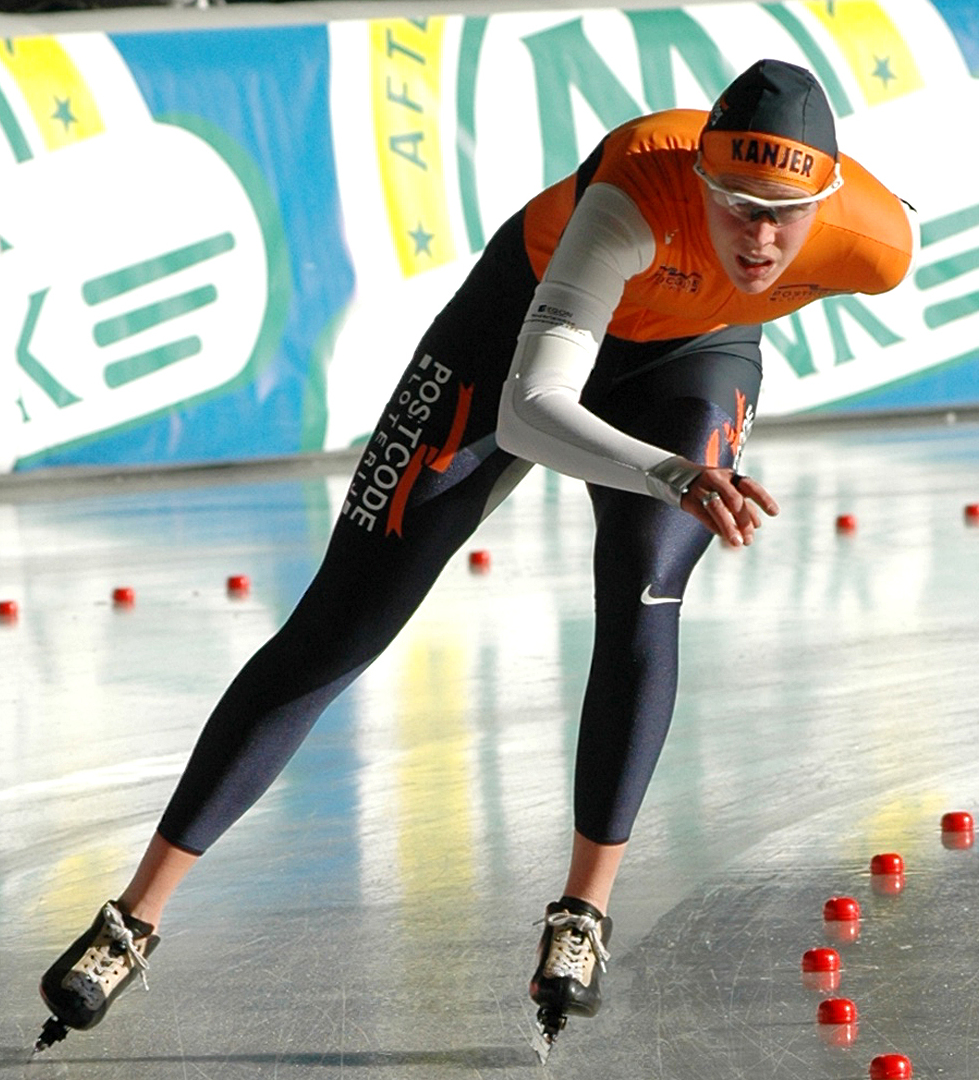

Personal information
- Born: 13 June 1981 (age 45) Lemmer, the Netherlands

Sport
- Sport: Speed skating
Medal record
Representing the Netherlands
World Championships
Bronze medal – third place	2004 Hamar	Allround
European Championships
Bronze medal – third place	2001 Baselga di Pinè	Allround
Dutch Allround championships
Silver medal – second place	2006 Utrecht	Allround

Wieteke Harmanna Cramer (born 13 June 1981) is a speed skater from the Netherlands who won bronze allround medals at the 2001 European Championships and the 2004 World Championships. She also won two national titles, in the 1500 m (2000) and allround (2006). She finished in second place allround in 2002, and in third place in the 3000 m (2000), 5000 m (2001) and allround (2004).

She stopped training in 2009 due to pregnancy. After giving birth to a son (Jip) on 4 January 2010 she changed to marathon speed skating.

== Personal records ==
Personal records
Speed skating
Event	Result	Date	Location	Notes
500 m	39:37	18 March 2006	Olympic Oval, Calgary	
1000 m	1:17.25	18 March 2001	Olympic Oval, Calgary	
1500 m	1:56.94	14 March 2007	Olympic Oval, Calgary	
3000 m	4:04.51	13 March 2007	Olympic Oval, Calgary	
5000 m	7:05.94	16 March 2001	Olympic Oval, Calgary	
