= Tom Prinsen =

Dutch speed skater

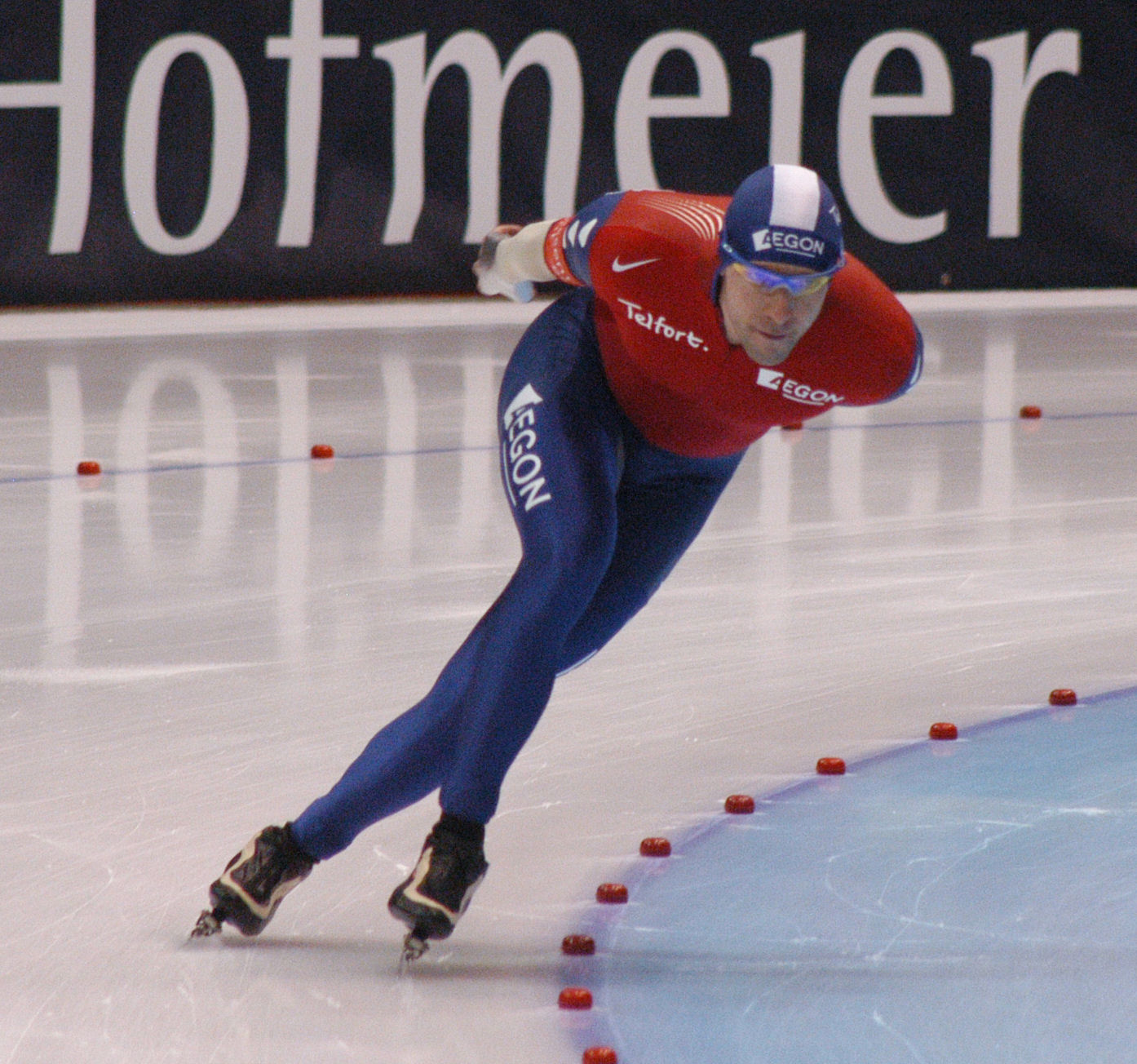
- Tom Prinsen

Personal information
- Born: November 11, 1982 (age 43) Hengelo, Netherlands

Sport
- Country: Netherlands
- Sport: Speed skating

Tom Prinsen (born 11 September 1982, in Hengelo) is a Dutch former long track speedskater who specialised in the longer distances. In 2003 he became Dutch neo junior champion. By beating Postma, Romme and Ritsma in a skateoff, he qualified himself for the World Championship of 2004 in Hamar, Norway. He ended in sixth place.

== Records ==
=== Personal records ===
Personal records
Speed skating
Event	Result	Date	Location	Notes
500 meter	36.96	18 March 2009	Calgary	
1000 meter	1:11.95	22 March 2003	Calgary	
1500 meter	1:46.60	19 March 2009	Calgary	
3000 meter	3:45.07	10 March 2007	Calgary	
5000 meter	6:17.34	13 March 2007	Calgary	
10000 meter	13:14.95	15 March 2007	Calgary	

Prinsen has a score of 149.974 points on the Adelskalender

=== World records ===
Event	Result	Date	Location	Note
3000 meter	3:46.75	21 March 2002	Calgary	Junior world record until 20 March 2003
5000 meter	6:29.69	22 March 2002	Calgary	Junior world record until 12 March 2004

== Tournament overview ==
Season	Dutch Championships Single Distances	Dutch Championships Allround	World Championships Allround	World Cup GWC	World Championships Junior Allround
2000–01					GRONINGEN 38th 500m 5th 3000m 12th 1500m (bronze) 5000m 8th overall
2001–02	GRONINGEN 14th 5000m				COLLALBO 38th 500m (gold) 3000m 15th 1500m (silver) 5000m 5th overall (bronze) team pursuit
2002–03	UTRECHT 20th 1500m 9th 5000m 7th 10000m	ASSEN 21st 500m 8th 5000m 16th 1500m 9th 10000m 10th overall			
2003–04	HEERENVEEN 8th 1500m 6th 5000m 6th 10000m	EINDHOVEN 7th 500m 7th 5000m 5th 1500m 5th 1000m 7th overall	HAMAR 15th 500m 5th 5000m 9th 1500m 4th 10000m 6th overall	26th 1500m 10th 5000/10000m	
2004–05	ASSEN 7th 1500m 5th 5000m	HEERENVEEN 9th 500m DQ 5000m 7th 1500m DNQ 10000m DQ overall		28th 5000/10000m	
2005–06	HEERENVEEN 20th 1500m 19th 5000m				
2006–07	ASSEN 19th 5000m	HEERENVEEN 21st 500m 6th 5000m 10th 1500m 6th 10000m 8th overall		(gold) team pursuit	
2007–08	HEERENVEEN 7th 1500m 4th 5000m 4th 10000m			21st 1500m 8th 5000/10000m (gold) team pursuit	
2008–09	HEERENVEEN 13th 1500m 12th 5000m	HEERENVEEN 10th 500m 11th 5000m DQ 1500m DNQ 10000m NC overall	HEERENVEEN 17th 500m 11th 5000m 14th 1500m 9th 10000m 10th overall	7th team pursuit	

- NC = No classification
- DQ = Disqualified
