= Rhian Ket =

Dutch speed skater (born 1983)

- Ket at the 2010 Dutch Single Distances Championships

Personal information
- Born: 16 August 1983 (age 43) Amstelveen, North Holland, Netherlands
- Years active: 2003-2014

Sport
- Sport: Speed skating
- Events: 1000- and 1500-metre
- Coached by: Johan de Wit

Rhian Ket (born 16 August 1983) is a Dutch former speed skater who specialized in the 1500 metres.

In 2003, Ket began his speed skating career with Jac Orie's team, sponsored at the time by the SponsorBingoLoterij (later the PostcodeLoterij). After a successful 2005–2006 season, Ket moved to the VPZ team, which was coached by Sijtje van der Lende. After an instructive year with VPZ, Ket joined the independent-minded APPM team; there, he achieved several successes between 2007 and 2010, whose highlight was his Dutch national title in the 1500 metres in 2009. Ket subsequently spent two seasons skating for the Hofmeier team, later Team Hart. In 2013, he moved to Project 2018 and once again qualified for World Cup events. In 2014, he ended his élite sports career.

Alongside his élite sports career, Ket studied at the FIFPro Online Academy. He also served on the Royal Dutch Skating Federation's (Koninklijke Nederlandsche Schaatsenrijders Bond; KNSB) élite sports steering committee and was a member of the NOC*NSF athletes' commission.

== Biography ==
Ket was considered a great talent, specializing in the middle distances — the 1000 metres and the 1500 metres. His career highlight came during the 2009–2010 Olympic season, when he won the Dutch national title in the 1500 metres, finishing ahead of the future Olympic champion, Mark Tuitert. In the next Olympic cycle, on 15 November 2013, he competed in a World Cup race over the same distance against Tuitert. Tuitert fell a lap and a half later, causing him to lose momentum; Ket finished with a time of 1:44.07 — just one hundredth of a second off his personal best.

Ket first made a name for himself on 30 December 2005. During the Dutch Single Distances Championships in Heerenveen, he finished a surprising fourth in the 1500 metres. In so doing, he placed ahead of several well-known skaters at an event that served as a qualifier for the 2006 Winter Olympics. Because the high level of competition meant that Ket had not secured a pre-nomination for the Games, his fourth-place finish did not result in automatic qualification — even though there were four Olympic spots available. In January, Ket had to face Simon Kuipers – who had been injured during the national championships and exercised a special exemption – in a skate-off. Kuipers won by a narrow margin, leaving Ket just short of qualifying for the Olympic Games.

In January 2006, the day after the skate-off, Ket won the 1500 metres at the Dutch All-round Championships in Utrecht by a wide margin. In so doing, he finished ahead of big names such as Mark Tuitert, Gianni Romme, and Rintje Ritsma. In October 2007, during the Dutch Single Distances Championships, Ket qualified for the 1500-metre World Cup events.

On 1 November 2009, he surprisingly won gold in the 1500 metres, whereas, the day before, he had been disqualified in the 1000 metres for skating in the inner lane twice. By winning the 1500 metres, Ket qualified for the World Cup events. He also secured Olympic qualification during the World Cup event in Berlin a week later.

In his first year at Hofmeier, Ket was unable to defend his title in the 1500. At the 2011 NK Distance Skating Championships he came fifth in the 1500 metres, which was good enough to qualify for the World Cup competitions. During this season he took part in almost all World Cup competitions, with his highest finish being 8th place during the World Cup finals in Heerenveen. There he finished as 2nd Dutchman and obtained a reserve place for the World Distance Championships in Inzell.

During the 2011–2012 season, despite being ill, Ket clocked a time of 1:47.62 at the Dutch Single Distances Championships, earning an impressive seventh-place finish. In December 2011, during the national skating week, he recorded a time of 1:47.64, which secured his direct qualification for the second cycle of the World Cup. Two days later, at the Dutch Sprint Championships, Ket sustained a groin injury during the first 500-metre race, forcing him to withdraw from the tournament. After a six-week rehabilitation period, Ket returned to competition at the Dutch All-round Championships, where he won the 500 metres with a time of 36.24 and placed second in the 1500 metres the next day. For the World Single Distances Championships in Heerenveen, he was once again named as a reserve for the 1500-metre event.

At the 2013 Dutch Single Distances Championships, Ket surprisingly clocked the exact same time as Jong Oranje (Dutch junior national team) skater Thomas Krol: 1:47.761. After Koen Verweij – who had actually recorded the fastest time – had been disqualified and the skating federation had subsequently decided to nominate Verweij for a spot, Krol and Ket chose to take the matter to the disputes committee in an effort to have a planned skate-off cancelled. The committee ruled in the skaters' favour. Ket was permitted to compete in the 1500-metre World Cup race in Kolomna, and Krol in Thialf.

== Personal bests ==
Distance	Time	Date	Track
500 m	36.21	18 January 2014	(Germany) Inzell
1000 m	1:09.43	10 August 2008	(Canada) Calgary
1500 m	1:44.06	4 December 2009	(Canada) Calgary
3000 m	3:44.85	8 August 2008	(Canada) Calgary
5000 m	6:24.88	21 March 2006	(Canada) Calgary
10 000 m	13:38.05	23 March 2006	(Canada) Calgary

== Results ==
Year	NK Distances	NK Sprint	NK All-round	World Cup	WK Juniors
2003	21st 1500 m				5th (silver) pursuit
2004	14th 1000 m 12th 1500 m 22nd 5000 m		24th		
2005	11th 1000 m 7th 1500 m 20th 5000 m		10th		
2006	8th 1000 m 4th 1500 m	12th	7th		
2007	10th 1000 m 6th 1500 m	17th	12th	37th 1500 m	
2008	7th 1000 m 5th 1500 m	23rd	16th	43rd 1500 m	
2009	8th 1000 m 6th 1500 m	NS1 1000 m	13th	0p 1500 m	
2010	DQ 1000 m (gold) 1500 m	14th		28th 1000 m 9th 1500 m (silver) pursuit	
2011	9th 1000 m 5th 1500 m			14th 1500 m	
2012	9th 1000 m 7th 1500 m	NS1 1000 m	13th		
2013	4th 1500 m				
2014	(bronze) 1500 m		8th		

=== Medal table ===
Championship	Gold (gold)	Silver (silver)	Bronze (bronze)
WK juniors	0	1	0
NK Distances	1	0	1
