= Ben Jongejan =

Dutch speed skater

Personal information
- Born: 9 January 1985 (age 41) Leidschendam, Netherlands

Sport
- Country: Netherlands
- Sport: Speed skating

Ben Jongejan (born 9 January 1985) is a Dutch long track speed skater who participates in international competitions.

== Personal records ==
Personal records
Men's Speed skating
Event	Result	Date	Location	Notes
500 m	37.21	2006-12-23	Heerenveen	
1,000 m	1:12.08	2006-12-16	Heerenveen	
1,500 m	1:47.11	2008-01-13	Kolomna	
3,000 m	3:53.07	2006-11-26	Eindhoven	
5,000 m	6:26.08	2008-01-12	Kolomna	
10,000 m	13:24.76	2008-01-13	Kolomna	

=== Career highlights ===
European Allround Championships
2008 - Kolomna, 6th
National Championships
2007- Groningen, (bronze) allround
2010 - Heerenveen, 5th allround
