= Speed skating at the 2006 Winter Olympics – Men's team pursuit =

Speed skating at the Olympics

Men's team pursuit at the XX Olympic Winter Games
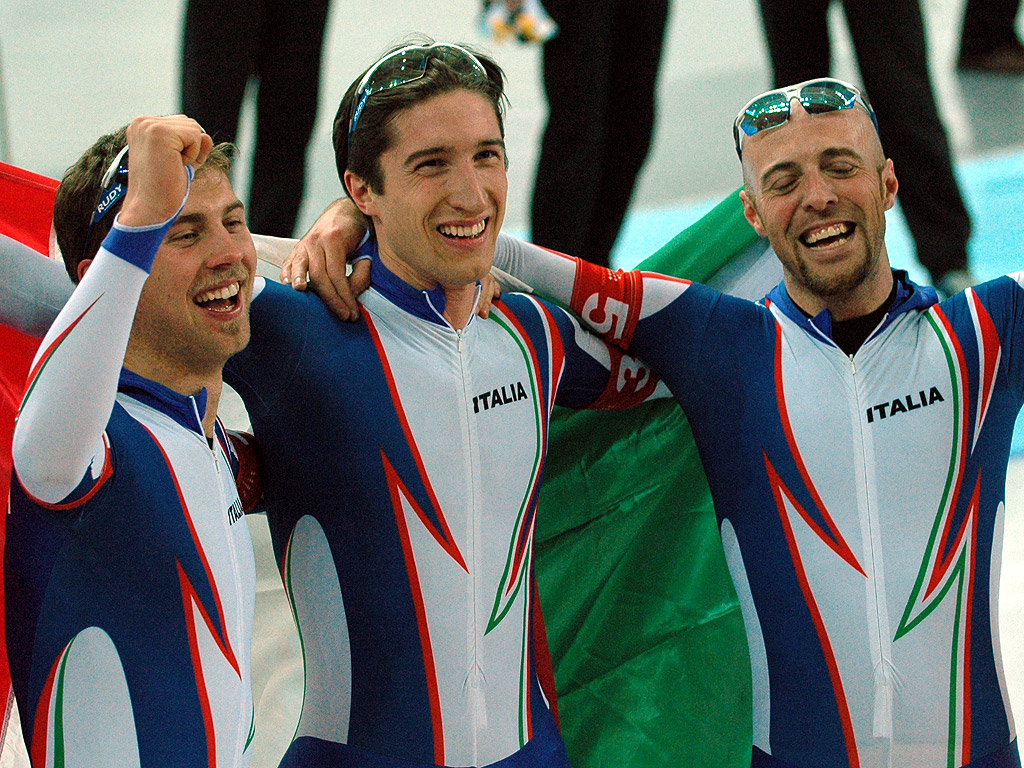
- The winning team Italy
- Venue: Oval Lingotto
- Dates: 15–16 February 2006
- Competitors: 36 from 8 nations
- Winning time: 3:47.28

Medalists
1st place, gold medalist(s)		Italy; Matteo Anesi, Stefano Donagrandi, Enrico Fabris, Ippolito Sanfratello
2nd place, silver medalist(s)		Canada; Arne Dankers, Steven Elm, Denny Morrison, Jason Parker, Justin Warsylewicz
3rd place, bronze medalist(s)		Netherlands; Sven Kramer, Rintje Ritsma, Mark Tuitert, Carl Verheijen, Erben Wennemars

The men's team pursuit competition at the 2006 Winter Olympics in Turin, Italy, began on 15 February at Oval Lingotto. The team pursuit consisted of a qualifying round, then a series of elimination races, with the winners of the elimination races progressing to the next round of the knockout phase.

Each race was skated by two teams of three skaters, over a distance of eight 400 metre laps (3200 metres total). The three skaters of a team were allowed to change order at any time, but the team's final time was always recorded when the third skater crossed the finishing line. If two teams started simultaneously on opposite sides of the track, and if one team managed to overtake the other before the full distance, the overtaking team was immediately declared the winner.

== Records ==
Prior to this competition, the existing world and Olympic records were as follows.

World record	Canada	3:39.69	Calgary, Canada	12 November 2005
Olympic record	None (debut sport)	None		

The following new world and Olympic records were set during this competition.

Date	Event	Team	Time	OR	WR
15 February	Heat 1	Germany; Stefan Heythausen; Robert Lehmann; Tobias Schneider	3:49.59	OR	
15 February	Heat 3	Netherlands; Rintje Ritsma; Mark Tuitert; Carl Verheijen	3:48.02	OR	
15 February	Heat 4	Canada; Arne Dankers; Steven Elm; Denny Morrison	3:47.37	OR	
15 February	Quarterfinals	Netherlands; Sven Kramer; Carl Verheijen; Erben Wennemars	3:44.65	OR	
15 February	Quarterfinals	Italy; Matteo Anesi; Enrico Fabris; Ippolito Sanfratello	3:43.64	OR	

== Results ==
Teams had to select three skaters for each round of the team pursuit, but all skaters who participated in at least one round earned a medal, and are mentioned in the overall results below.

Rank	Team
1	Italy; Matteo Anesi; Stefano Donagrandi; Enrico Fabris; Ippolito Sanfratello
1	Canada; Arne Dankers; Steven Elm; Denny Morrison; Jason Parker; Justin Warsylewicz
1	Netherlands; Sven Kramer; Rintje Ritsma; Mark Tuitert; Carl Verheijen; Erben Wennemars
4	Norway; Håvard Bøkko; Eskil Ervik; Mikael Flygind Larsen; Øystein Grødum; Lasse Sætre
5	Russia; Artyom Detyshev; Alexandr Kibalko; Yevgeny Lalenkov; Dmitry Shepel; Ivan Skobrev
6	United States; K. C. Boutiette; Chad Hedrick; Charles Ryan Leveille Cox; Clay Mull; Derek Parra
7	Germany; Joerg Dallmann; Stefan Heythausen; Robert Lehmann; Tobias Schneider
8	Japan; Kesato Miyazaki; Teruhiro Sugimori; Takahiro Ushiyama

=== Heats ===
Rank	Team	Time	Notes
1	Canada; Arne Dankers; Steven Elm; Denny Morrison	3:47.37	OR
2	Italy; Stefano Donagrandi; Enrico Fabris; Ippolito Sanfratello	3:47.79	
3	Netherlands; Rintje Ritsma; Mark Tuitert; Carl Verheijen	3:48.02	
4	Norway; Eskil Ervik; Øystein Grødum; Lasse Sætre	3:49.55	
5	Germany; Stefan Heythausen; Robert Lehmann; Tobias Schneider	3:49.59	
6	Russia; Artyom Detyshev; Alexandr Kibalko; Ivan Skobrev	3:49.75	
7	United States; Charles Ryan Leveille Cox; Clay Mull; Derek Parra	3:51.32	
8	Japan; Kesato Miyazaki; Teruhiro Sugimori; Takahiro Ushiyama	4:03.83	

1: As this was a debut Olympic event, the teams from Germany and the Netherlands both briefly held the Olympic record time. Germany set the record in the first heat, while the Netherlands surpassed it in the third, before Canada posted the fastest time in the final heat

=== Knockout round ===
==== Quarterfinals ====
Seed	Team	Time	Notes
1	Canada; Denny Morrison; Jason Parker; Justin Warsylewicz	3:52.01	Q
8	Japan; Kesato Miyazaki; Teruhiro Sugimori; Takahiro Ushiyama	3:53.88	

Seed	Team	Time	Notes
4	Norway; Håvard Bøkko; Eskil Ervik; Mikael Flygind Larsen	3:47.81	Q
5	Germany; Jörg Dallmann; Stefan Heythausen; Tobias Schneider	3:49.68	

Seed	Team	Time	Notes
2	Italy; Matteo Anesi; Enrico Fabris; Ippolito Sanfratello	3:43.64	Q OR
7	United States; K. C. Boutiette; Chad Hedrick; Charles Ryan Leveille Cox	3:44.11	

Seed	Team	Time	Notes
3	Netherlands; Sven Kramer; Carl Verheijen; Erben Wennemars	3:44.65	Q
6	Russia; Yevgeny Lalenkov; Dmitry Shepel; Ivan Skobrev	3:47.49	

2: This time was briefly the Olympic record, as the Dutch surpassed Canada's qualifying time before Italy set the fastest time of the quarterfinal stage one race later.

==== Semifinals ====
The Italian men's team was well behind the Dutch team in their semi-final heat, and although they were gaining it was late in the race and the Dutch seemed en route to a victory. However, Dutch skater Sven Kramer fell on a corner, taking his team's chances down with him and allowing Italy to go through to the gold medal race.

Seed	Team	Time	Notes
1	Canada; Arne Dankers; Denny Morrison; Justin Warsylewicz	3:44.91	Q
4	Norway; Håvard Bøkko; Eskil Ervik; Øystein Grødum	3:47.81	

Seed	Team	Time	Notes
2	Italy; Matteo Anesi; Enrico Fabris; Ippolito Sanfratello	Overtook	Q
3	Netherlands; Sven Kramer; Carl Verheijen; Erben Wennemars	Overtaken	

==== Finals ====
Four finals determined the final finishing order, with the two semifinal winners meeting for gold, and the two semifinal losers racing for bronze. To determine places five-through-eight, the four quarterfinal losers were ranked by their time in the quarterfinal race, with the fastest loser matched up against the second-fastest for fifth, and the two slowest for seventh.

Final A (gold medal)

Seed	Team	Time	Notes
1	Canada; Arne Dankers; Steven Elm; Justin Warsylewicz	3:47.28	Silver medal
2	Italy; Matteo Anesi; Enrico Fabris; Ippolito Sanfratello	3:44.46	Gold medal

Final B (bronze medal)

Seed	Team	Time	Notes
3	Netherlands; Sven Kramer; Mark Tuitert; Carl Verheijen	3:44.53	Bronze medal
4	Norway; Håvard Bøkko; Eskil Ervik; Mikael Flygind Larsen	3:45.96	

Final C (5th place)

Seed	Team	Time	Notes
6	Russia; Aleksandr Kibalko; Dmitry Shepel; Ivan Skobrev	3:46.91	
7	United States; K. C. Boutiette; Charles Ryan Leveille Cox; Clay Mull	3:49.73	

Final D (7th place)

Seed	Team	Time	Notes
5	Germany; Stefan Heythausen; Robert Lehmann; Tobias Schneider	3:48.28	
8	Japan; Kesato Miyazaki; Teruhiro Sugimori; Takahiro Ushiyama	3:50.37	
