= Speed skating at the 2006 Winter Olympics – Men's 5000 metres =

Speed skating at the Olympics

Men's 5000 metres at the XX Olympic Winter Games
- Venue: Oval Lingotto
- Dates: 11 February 2006
- Competitors: 28 from 15 nations
- Winning time: 6:14.68

Medalists
1st place, gold medalist(s)		Chad Hedrick; United States
2nd place, silver medalist(s)		Sven Kramer; Netherlands
3rd place, bronze medalist(s)		Enrico Fabris; Italy

The men's 5000 m speed skating competition was held on 11 February, the first day of competition at the 2006 Winter Olympics in Turin, Italy. The American Chad Hedrick, a former inline skater, began his quest to emulate Eric Heiden by taking five gold medals by racing a time of 6:14.68, 0.02 second behind the four-year-old Olympic record of Jochem Uytdehaage, which was enough to clinch gold. Dutchman Sven Kramer won the silver medal, 1.72 seconds adrift, while home skater Enrico Fabris claimed Italy's first medal by skating home the bronze in the last pair.

== Records ==
Prior to this competition, the existing world and Olympic records were as follows.

World record	Sven Kramer (NED)	6:08.78	Salt Lake City, United States	19 November 2005
Olympic record	Jochem Uytdehaage (NED)	6:14.66	Salt Lake City, United States	9 February 2002

No new world or Olympic records were set during this competition. Although, American Chad Hedrick missed out on the Olympic record by just 0.02 second.

== Results ==
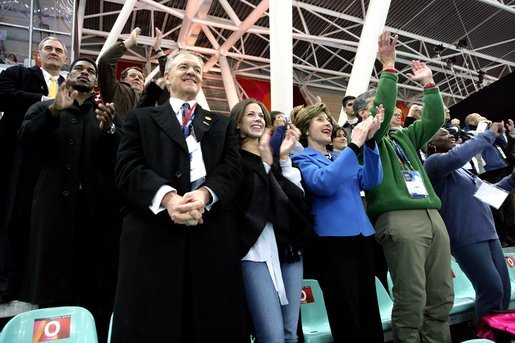
Laura Bush and Barbara Bush Jr supporting Chad Hedrick

Rank	Pair	Lane	Name	Country	Time	Time behind	Notes
Gold medal	12	O	Chad Hedrick	United States	6:14.68		
Silver medal	11	I	Sven Kramer	Netherlands	6:16.40	+1.72	
Bronze medal	14	O	Enrico Fabris	Italy	6:18.25	+3.57	
4	11	O	Carl Verheijen	Netherlands	6:18.84	+4.16	
5	13	I	Arne Dankers	Canada	6:21.26	+6.58	
6	12	I	Bob de Jong	Netherlands	6:22.12	+7.44	
7	13	O	Shani Davis	United States	6:23.08	+8.40	
8	8	O	Øystein Grødum	Norway	6:24.21	+9.53	
9	7	O	Lasse Sætre	Norway	6:25.15	+10.47	
10	14	O	Eskil Ervik	Norway	6:26.91	+12.23	
11	9	I	Ivan Skobrev	Russia	6:27.02	+12.34	
12	7	I	Johan Röjler	Sweden	6:29.24	+14.56	
13	1	O	Bart Veldkamp	Belgium	6:32.02	+17.34	
14	9	O	Ippolito Sanfratello	Italy	6:32.58	+17.90	
15	10	O	Artyom Detyshev	Russia	6:32.85	+18.17	
16	3	O	Stefano Donagrandi	Italy	6:33.45	+18.77	
17	10	I	Yury Kokhanets	Russia	6:34.62	+19.94	
18	5	O	Paweł Zygmunt	Poland	6:35.01	+20.33	
19	6	O	K. C. Boutiette	United States	6:37.29	+22.61	
20	8	I	Jens Boden	Germany	6:38.34	+23.66	
21	6	I	Kesato Miyazaki	Japan	6:40.03	+25.35	
22	5	I	Steven Elm	Canada	6:41.53	+26.85	
23	4	O	Dmitry Babenko	Kazakhstan	6:42.25	+27.57	
24	3	I	Justin Warsylewicz	Canada	6:43.74	+29.06	
25	2	O	Gao Xuefeng	China	6:44.78	+30.10	
26	1	I	Claudiu Grozea	Romania	6:50.29	+35.61	
27	4	I	Takahiro Ushiyama	Japan	6:51.53	+36.85	
28	2	I	Yeo Sang-yeop	South Korea	6:58.13	+43.45	

=== Lap times ===
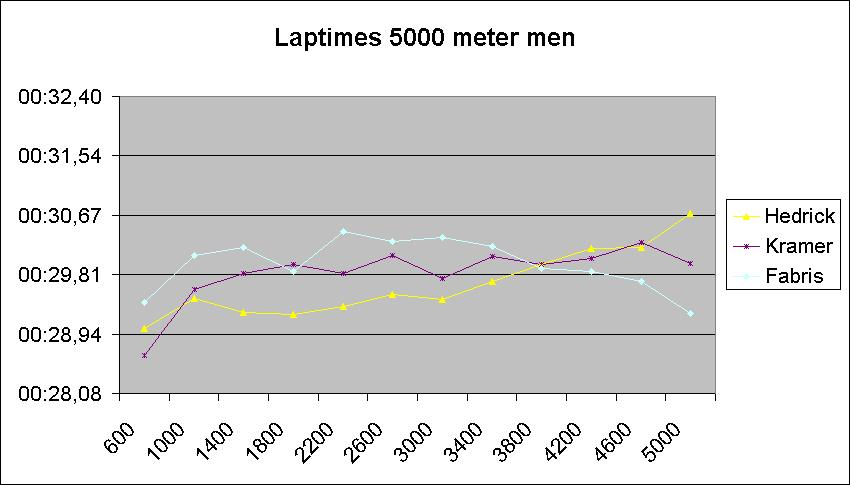
Lap times for the three best athletes, shown graphically

1. Chad Hedrick, United States, (18.64 – 29.03 – 29.46 – 29.26 – 29.23 – 29.34 – 29.52 – 29.45 – 29.71 – 29.95 – 30.19 – 30.20 – 30.70) 6:14.68
2. Sven Kramer, Netherlands, (18.45 – 28.63 – 29.59 – 29.83 – 29.95 – 29.82 – 30.08 – 29.75 – 30.07 – 29.95 – 30.04 – 30.27 – 29.97) 6:16.40 (+ 1.72)
3. Enrico Fabris, Italy, (18.70 – 29.40 – 30.09 – 30.20 – 29.86 – 30.43 – 30.29 – 30.35 – 30.22 – 29.90 – 29.85 – 29.71 – 29.25) 6:18.25 (+ 3.57)
4. Carl Verheijen, Netherlands, (18.49 – 28.93 – 29.81 – 30.04 – 29.93 – 29.94 – 29.82 – 30.02 – 30.23 – 29.98 – 30.42 – 30.66 – 30.57) 6:18.84 (+ 4.16)
5. Arne Dankers, Canada, (19.43 – 29.00 – 29.33 – 29.75 – 29.80 – 30.09 – 30.16 – 30.33 – 30.36 – 30.59 – 30.65 – 30.83 – 30.94) 6:21.26 (+ 6.58)
6. Bob de Jong, Netherlands, (19.58 – 29.67 – 30.30 – 30.28 – 30.00 – 30.11 – 30.03 – 30.07 – 30.11 – 30.22 – 30.35 – 30.54 – 30.86) 6:22.12 (+ 7.44)
7. Shani Davis, United States, (18.37 – 28.38 – 29.49 – 30.08 – 30.34 – 30.05 – 30.54 – 30.36 – 30.61 – 30.67 – 31.08 – 30.90 – 32.21) 6:23.08 (+ 8.40)
8. Øystein Grødum, Norway, (19.31 – 29.01 – 29.73 – 29.77 – 30.09 – 30.24 – 30.55 – 30.48 – 30.66 – 30.67 – 31.28 – 31.21 – 31.21) 6:24.21 (+ 9.53)
9. Lasse Sætre, Norway, (19.38 – 29.80 – 30.12 – 30.02 – 30.13 – 30.19 – 30.23 – 30.19 – 30.51 – 30.70 – 31.20 – 31.24 – 31.44) 6:25.15 (+ 10.47)
10. Eskil Ervik, Norway, (18.64 – 29.77 – 29.97 – 29.97 – 30.52 – 29.87 – 30.76 – 30.72 – 31.11 – 30.86 – 31.55 – 31.51 – 31.66) 6:26.91 (+ 12.23)

=== Detailed results ===
Skater in inner pair on first lap listed first

1. Claudiu Grozea, ROM – Bart Veldkamp, BEL
  - After running even with the Romanian for the first 200 metres from the outside lane, Veldkamp started with two sub-30 laps, and despite going up in lap times for the whole race and ending with a lap of 32.84, Veldkamp finished in 6:32.02, 18 seconds ahead of his Romanian compatriot.
2. Yeo Sang-yeop, KOR – Gao Xuefeng, CHN
  - Neither of the Asians had the stamina to catch Veldkamp; though Yeo was two seconds behind after 3.5 laps, and skated his first four full laps under 30 seconds, he finished with his last four laps in 36 seconds and ended with the worst time yet, 6:58.13. Gao held better, with a last lap of 34.10, and finished in second place with 6:44.78.
3. Justin Warsylewicz, CAN – Stefano Donagrandi, ITA
  - Warsylewicz, who clocked the first 3,000 metres in 3:54.51, was only 0.6 seconds behind Donagrandi then. However, he finished with laps of 34 and 35; Donagrandi kept his lap times better, only bursting into 32 on his penultimate lap, and went into second place with 6:33.45, over 10 seconds ahead of Warsylewicz.
4. Takahiro Ushiyama, JPN – Dmitry Babenko, KAZ
  - Two more Asians; Babenko won the battle, placing third after four pairs with 6:42.25, while Ushiyama fell behind in the first few hundred metres and eventually clocked 6:51.53, which was to be the second worst time of the day.
5. Steven Elm, CAN – Paweł Zygmunt, POL
  - Zygmunt took an early lead, and remained ahead for the entire race, as the Canadian went into 31 on the third full lap and 32 on the fifth; Zygmunt did not break 31 until the sixth lap. With three laps to go, Zygmunt was 0.08 behind second-placed Donagrandi; however, a last lap of 33.61 spoiled his chance of a second place thus far, as he clocked 6:35.01. Elm placed fourth, a further six seconds adrift.
6. Kesato Miyazaki, JPN – K. C. Boutiette, USA
  - Miyazaki, the last Asian, also records the best time of any Asian skater in the race; however, Boutiette kept ahead from the start, and despite losing time mid-race with a worst lap of 32.45, he went under 32 again for the penultimate lap. Boutiette eventually placed fourth, with 6:37.29, while Miyazaki, a further three seconds adrift, was fifth.
7. Johan Röjler, SWE - Lasse Sætre, NOR
  - The Scandinavians both better the leading time of Veldkamp, who was finally dethroned after six pairs in the lead. Röjler led the pair until 3,000 metres, when Sætre took over, clocking a time of 3:50.06, 1.4 seconds ahead of Veldkamp. Sætre went up from 30.19 on the seventh lap to 31.44 on the final lap, but still extended his lead over Veldkamp to 6.88 seconds. Röjler's time of 6:29.24 puts him between the two.
8. Jens Boden, GER – Øystein Grødum, NOR
  - Grødum gained 0.86 seconds on the leader Sætre on the first 600 metres, and didn't give them away, skating a race broadly similar to Sætre's. The German, who won a bronze medal at Salt Lake City in 2002, skates his last five laps above 32 seconds, and his time of 6:38.34 was only enough for eighth place.
9. Ivan Skobrev, RUS – Ippolito Sanfratello, ITA
  - Skobrev kept slightly behind Grødum and slightly ahead of his pairmate for most of the race; his final laps cost him a few tenths to Grødum, and he eventually finished in 6:27.02, three seconds behind the Norwegian. Sanfratello was within half a second until 3,000 metres, but went over 32 seconds towards the end, and his time of 6:32.58 was also behind Veldkamp for a fifth place thus far.
10. Yury Kokhanets, RUS – Artyom Detyshev, RUS
  - Skobrev remains the best Russian after this all-Russian pairing; neither could keep their laps below 32 for the entire race, with Kokhanets skating seven laps between 31 and 32. Detyshev skated the first seven full laps below 31, but finished in 33.16, keeping Kokhanets 1.77 seconds behind him as they go into sixth and eighth place respectively.
11. Carl Verheijen, NED – Sven Kramer, NED
  - Kramer and Verheijen had taken a 1–2 at the Salt Lake City World Cup event in November 2005, when Kramer set a world record; now, Kramer clocked his first 600 metres in just over 47 seconds, 1.3 seconds ahead of leader Grødum. With a worst lap of 30.27, and all but four of his laps below 30, Kramer eventually betters the leading time by eight seconds to end with 6:16.40; Verheijen was not much worse, but lost 1.5 seconds on the final two kilometres, and ended with 6:18.84.
12. Bob de Jong, NED – Chad Hedrick, USA
  - Hedrick took the lead by eight tenths out of his first outer curve, and just extended that lead, as de Jong could only keep below 30 on his first full lap and ended with 6:22.12. Hedrick had caught up with Kramer by 1,400 metres after laps of 29.5, 29.3 and 29.2 seconds, and his six next laps were also below 30, as he took a lead of 2.5 seconds with three laps to go. He lost somewhat towards the end, and a last lap of 30.70 prevented him from skating under Jochem Uytdehaage's Olympic record of 6:14.66; he finished 0.02 seconds behind it.
13. Arne Dankers, CAN – Shani Davis, USA
  - Davis, the leader of the World Cup on 1,000 metres, clocked the fastest first 600 metres of the day with 46.75. However, after a first full lap of 28.38, the fastest of the day, Davis trailed off, and the second lap following that went slower than 30 seconds. Dankers overtook him with three laps to go, and kept his lap times below 31 to go into fourth place with 6:21.26, while Davis' last lap of 32.21 sent him in 0.96 seconds behind Bob de Jong and into sixth place.
14. Enrico Fabris, ITA – Eskil Ervik, NOR
  - Fabris, the European all-round champion of 2006, paired up with the winner of the 5,000 metres at that event. After the two exchanged the lead for the first 2,000 metres, Fabris gained on his pairmate who had two laps around 30.75, but by 3,000 metres Fabris was more than five seconds behind the leading time. However, Fabris skated progressively faster for his last five laps, and his last lap of 29.25 was his fastest of the entire race; he was the only skater to achieve this. It also brought him in 0.59 seconds ahead of Verheijen to clinch bronze. Ervik, Norway's best by the World Cup standings, completed his last three laps with times above 31.5 seconds, and finished in tenth place, worst of the Norwegians with 6:26.91.
