= Speed skating at the 2006 Winter Olympics – Men's 10,000 metres =

Speed skating at the Olympics

Men's 10,000 metres at the XX Olympic Winter Games
- Pictogram for speed skating
- Venue: Oval Lingotto
- Dates: 24 February 2006
- Competitors: 16 from 8 nations
- Winning time: 13:01.57

Medalists
1st place, gold medalist(s)		Bob de Jong; Netherlands
2nd place, silver medalist(s)		Chad Hedrick; United States
3rd place, bronze medalist(s)		Carl Verheijen; Netherlands

The Men's 10,000 m speed skating competition at the 2006 Winter Olympics in Turin, Italy, was held on 24 February.

== Records ==
Prior to this competition, the existing world and Olympic records were as follows.

World record	Chad Hedrick (USA)	12:55.11	Salt Lake City, United States	31 December 2005
Olympic record	Jochem Uytdehaage (NED)	12:58.92	Salt Lake City, United States	22 February 2002

No new world or Olympic records were set during this competition.

== Results ==
Rank	Pair	Lane	Name	Country	Time	Time Behind	Notes
Gold medal	4	I	Bob de Jong	Netherlands	13:01.57	–	
Silver medal	8	I	Chad Hedrick	United States	13:05.40	+3.83	
Bronze medal	8	O	Carl Verheijen	Netherlands	13:08.80	+7.23	
4	4	O	Øystein Grødum	Norway	13:12.58	+11.01	
5	7	I	Lasse Sætre	Norway	13:12.93	+11.36	
6	2	I	Ivan Skobrev	Russia	13:17.54	+15.97	
7	5	O	Sven Kramer	Netherlands	13:18.14	+16.57	
8	6	O	Enrico Fabris	Italy	13:21.54	+19.97	
9	5	I	Arne Dankers	Canada	13:23.55	+21.98	
10	6	I	Johan Röjler	Sweden	13:29.50	+27.93	
11	7	O	Eskil Ervik	Norway	13:37.62	+36.05	
12	3	O	Ippolito Sanfratello	Italy	13:41.91	+40.34	
13	1	O	Stefano Donagrandi	Italy	13:47.67	+46.10	
14	2	O	Bart Veldkamp	Belgium	13:48.12	+46.55	
15	1	I	Charles Ryan Leveille Cox	United States	14:14.81	+1:13.24	
	3	I	Artyom Detyshev	Russia	DQ		

1: Detyshev was disqualified for cutting a curve line, under ISU Rule 251.1
