= 2007 World Allround Speed Skating Championships =

International speed skating competition

World Allround Speed Skating Championships
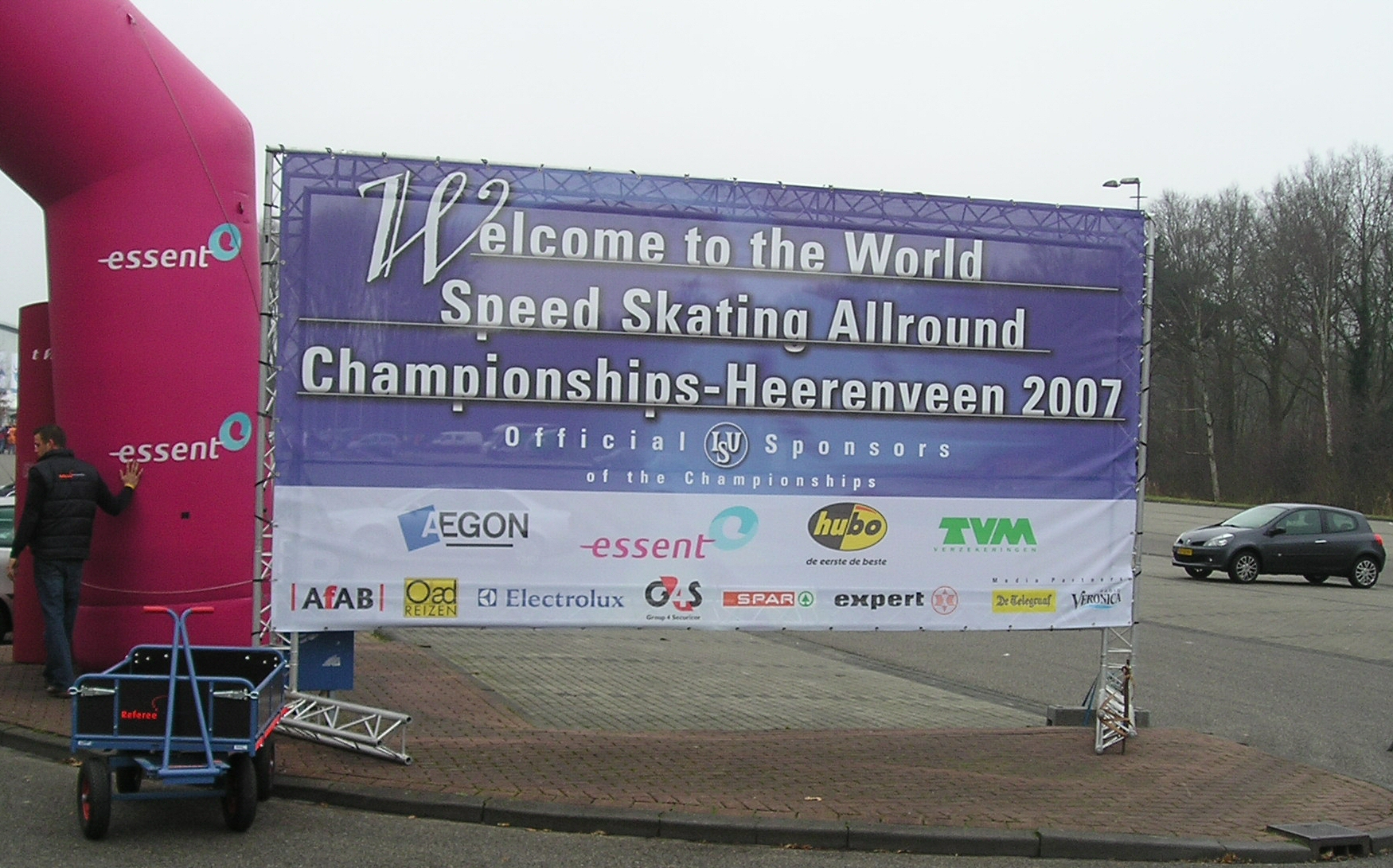
- Thialf (Heerenveen)
- Location: Heerenveen, Netherlands
- Venue: Thialf
- Dates: 9–11 February
- Competitors: 48

Medalist men
1st place, gold medalist(s)		Sven Kramer	NED
2nd place, silver medalist(s)		Enrico Fabris	ITA
3rd place, bronze medalist(s)		Carl Verheijen	NED

Medalist women
1st place, gold medalist(s)		Ireen Wüst	NED
2nd place, silver medalist(s)		Anni Friesinger	GER
3rd place, bronze medalist(s)		Cindy Klassen	CAN

The 2007 World Allround Speed Skating Championships were held in the indoor arena Thialf in Heerenveen, Netherlands on 9–11 February 2007. The Championships were three-day allround events, with the skaters completing four distances before the final championship standings are determined based on the samalog system. The organising body, the Royal Dutch Speed Skating Association (KNSB), celebrated its 125-year anniversary with full stands on all three days.

Athletes from the host country, the Netherlands, won both the men's and the women's event; Sven Kramer set a world record on the men's 10,000 metres on his way to the European and World Allround double, while Ireen Wüst won by nearly two points after being narrowly beaten by Martina Sáblíková at the European Championships. For the first time since 1979, the male and female World Champion came from the same country. Defending champion Shani Davis finished sixth after losing time on the two longest distances, while former sprint World Champion Erben Wennemars debuted at the World Allround Championships with a fifth place. Last year's female champion, Cindy Klassen, finished third, a quarter of a point behind Anni Friesinger, who did not compete in 2006.

== Men championships ==
=== 500 m ===
World Championships debutant Wennemars won from the last pair, just ahead of Morrison (silver in 2006) and Davis (gold in 2006). European Champion Kramer, who won the bronze medal in 2006, finished fifth, more than a second closer to the lead than in 2006, after setting a new personal best time of 36.41. From the fourth of twelve pairs, 2004 champion Hedrick took the lead with his time of 36.77, but still finished twelfth, nine places down from 2006.

Pos.	Race	Time	Pos.	Allround rankings	Points
1st place, gold medalist(s)	Erben Wennemars (NED)	35.79	1.	Erben Wennemars (NED)	35.790
2nd place, silver medalist(s)	Denny Morrison (CAN)	35.81	2.	Denny Morrison (CAN)	35.810
3rd place, bronze medalist(s)	Shani Davis (USA)	35.84	3.	Shani Davis (USA)	35.840
4.	Enrico Fabris (ITA)	36.27	4.	Enrico Fabris (ITA)	36.270
5.	Sven Kramer (NED)	36.41	5.	Sven Kramer (NED)	36.410
6.	Ivan Skobrev (RUS)	36.43	6.	Ivan Skobrev (RUS)	36.430
7.	Stefan Heythausen (GER)	36.44	7.	Stefan Heythausen (GER)	36.440
8.	Choi Kwun-won (KOR)	36.53	8.	Choi Kwun-won (KOR)	36.530
9.	Håvard Bøkko (NOR)	36.58	9.	Håvard Bøkko (NOR)	36.580
10.	Steven Elm (CAN)	36.66	10.	Steven Elm (CAN)	36.660
12.	Chad Hedrick (USA)	36.77	12.	Chad Hedrick (USA)	36.770
15.	Carl Verheijen (NED)	37.13	15.	Carl Verheijen (NED)	37.130
16.	Eskil Ervik (NOR)	37.40	16.	Eskil Ervik (NOR)	37.400

=== 5000 m ===
In 2006, Kramer had won this distance by a hundredth of a second over Hedrick, and half a second over fourth-placed Davis. Now, Kramer was dominant, clocking a time which Verheijen in the final pair could only come within four seconds of. Davis finished 14 seconds adrift, falling down to third in the overall standings after the first day, while Fabris in second had also lost to Kramer compared to 2006. Ervik, distance fifth in 2006 only a couple of seconds behind Kramer, opened at 1500-metre pace and slowed down considerably, falling all the way down to ninth.

Pos.	Race	Time	Pos.	Allround rankings	Points
1st place, gold medalist(s)	Sven Kramer (NED)	6:12.97	1.	Sven Kramer (NED)	73.707
2nd place, silver medalist(s)	Carl Verheijen (NED)	6:16.16	2.	Enrico Fabris (ITA)	74.180
3rd place, bronze medalist(s)	Enrico Fabris (ITA)	6:19.10	3.	Shani Davis (USA)	74.460
4.	Håvard Bøkko (NOR)	6:20.34	4.	Håvard Bøkko (NOR)	74.614
5.	Wouter olde Heuvel (NED)	6:20.37	5.	Carl Verheijen (NED)	74.746
6.	Arne Dankers (CAN)	6:24.29	6.	Erben Wennemars (NED)	74.755
7.	Shani Davis (USA)	6:26.20	7.	Wouter olde Heuvel (NED)	75.157
8.	Johan Röjler (SWE)	6:26.96	8.	Denny Morrison (CAN)	75.277
9.	Eskil Ervik (NOR)	6:28.21	9.	Ivan Skobrev (RUS)	75.421
10.	Erben Wennemars (NED)	6:29.65	10.	Eskil Ervik (NOR)	76.221
17.	Chad Hedrick (USA)	6:36.59	14.	Chad Hedrick (USA)	76.429

=== 1500 m ===
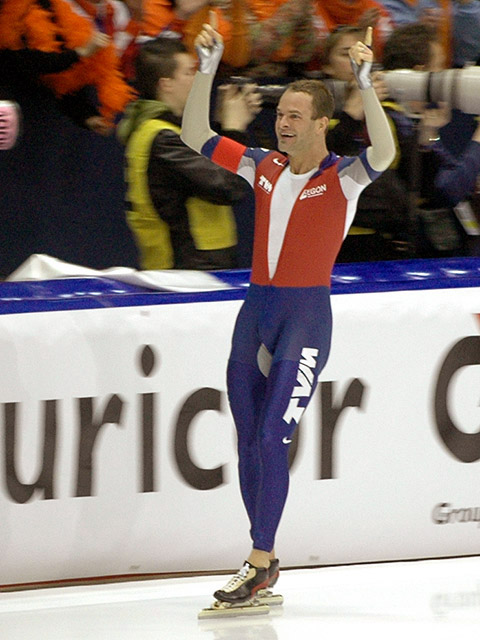
Distance winner Erben Wennemars smiling after the race.

This became Kramer's weakest distance of the championship, weak enough to allow Fabris to catch up in the overall standings before the final distance. The distance between the two before the final distance was 1.26 seconds, half a second more than in Collalbo. Kramer and Fabris skated in the last pair; before that, Wennemars had set a track record with 1:45.19 in the tenth pair. Davis finished fourth, three places down compared to Calgary, and needed to beat Wennemars on the 10,000 to take bronze - while also keeping Verheijen within 12 seconds, though Verheijen had beaten Davis by ten seconds over the half-distance. Hedrick's thirteenth place meant he was not good enough to qualify for the final distance, but his win over Canadian Justin Warsylewicz in the allround total, however, kept Warsylewicz out of the final distance.

Pos.	Race	Time	Pos.	Allround rankings	Points
1st place, gold medalist(s)	Erben Wennemars (NED)	1:45.19	1.	Sven Kramer (NED)	109.440
2nd place, silver medalist(s)	Denny Morrison (CAN)	1:45.70	2.	Enrico Fabris (ITA)	109.503
3rd place, bronze medalist(s)	Enrico Fabris (ITA)	1:45.97	3.	Erben Wennemars (NED)	109.818
4.	Shani Davis (USA)	1:46.10	4.	Shani Davis (USA)	109.826
5.	Carl Verheijen (NED)	1:47.18	5.	Carl Verheijen (NED)	110.472
6.	Sven Kramer (NED)	1:47.20	6.	Denny Morrison (CAN)	110.510
7.	Eskil Ervik (NOR)	1:47.49	7.	Håvard Bøkko (NOR)	110.620
8.	Steven Elm (CAN)	1:47.60	8.	Wouter olde Heuvel (NED)	111.267
9.	Stefan Heythausen (GER)	1:47.97	9.	Ivan Skobrev (RUS)	111.774
10.	Håvard Bøkko (NOR)	1:48.02	10.	Eskil Ervik (NOR)	112.051
11.	Arne Dankers (CAN)	1:48.29	12.	Chad Hedrick (USA)	112.582
12.	Wouter olde Heuvel (NED)	1:48.33	16.	Johan Röjler (SWE)	112.746
13.	Chad Hedrick (USA)	1:48.46	17.	Arne Dankers (CAN)	112.945

=== 10000 m ===
In the final pair, Kramer, who set a world record at the 2006 Championship, now bettered that world record by a second to become the first to skate 10 km below 12:50. Kramer only required to skate 13:12 to become world champion, but in the final pair he and Verheijen were in a class of their own. Verheijen beat Fabris by 15 seconds, but needed to beat him by 19 seconds to take the silver medal, thus the allround podium was identical to that at the European Championships. Ervik finished on the podium on the 10,000 metres for the first time in any race this season, but did not advance significantly in the final standings.

Pos.	Race	Time	Pos.	Allround rankings	Points
1st place, gold medalist(s)	Sven Kramer (NED)	12:49.88	1.	Sven Kramer (NED)	147.934
2nd place, silver medalist(s)	Carl Verheijen (NED)	12:55.30	2.	Enrico Fabris (ITA)	149.043
3rd place, bronze medalist(s)	Eskil Ervik (NOR)	13:08.92	3.	Carl Verheijen (NED)	149.237
4.	Enrico Fabris (ITA)	13:10.80	4.	Håvard Bøkko (NOR)	150.325
5.	Håvard Bøkko (NOR)	13:14.03	5.	Erben Wennemars (NED)	150.601
6.	Wouter olde Heuvel (NED)	13:18.38	6.	Shani Davis (USA)	150.712
7.	Ivan Skobrev (RUS)	13:22.15	7.	Wouter olde Heuvel (NED)	151.186
8.	Johan Röjler (SWE)	13:24.96	8.	Eskil Ervik (NOR)	151.497
9.	Arne Dankers (CAN)	13:25.43	9.	Ivan Skobrev (RUS)	151.881
10.	Erben Wennemars (NED)	13:35.67	10.	Denny Morrison (CAN)	152.611
11.	Shani Davis (USA)	13:37.73	11.	Johan Röjler (SWE)	152.994
12.	Denny Morrison (CAN)	14:02.03	12.	Arne Dankers (CAN)	153.216

=== Allround results ===
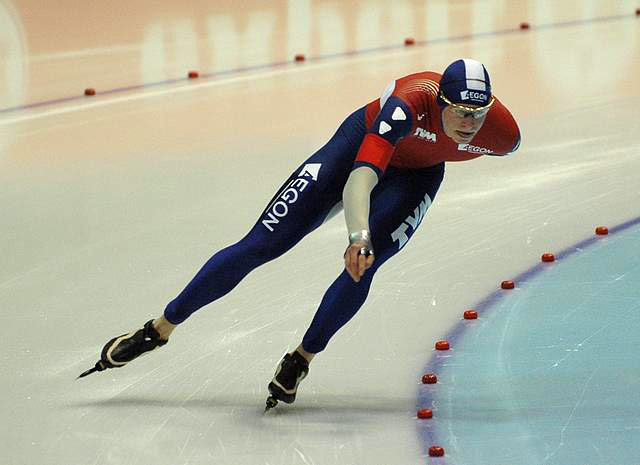
The world champion, Sven Kramer, through a curve.

Place	Athlete	Country	500 m	5000 m	1500 m	10000 m	Points
1st place, gold medalist(s)	Sven Kramer	Netherlands	36.41 ( 5)	6:12.97 ( 1)	1:47.20 ( 6)	12:49.88 ( 1)	147.934
2nd place, silver medalist(s)	Enrico Fabris	Italy	36.27 ( 4)	6:19.10 ( 3)	1:45.97 ( 3)	13:10.80 ( 4)	149.043
3rd place, bronze medalist(s)	Carl Verheijen	Netherlands	37.13 (15)	6:16.16 ( 2)	1:47.18 ( 5)	12:55.30 ( 2)	149.237
4	Håvard Bøkko	Norway	36.58 ( 9)	6:20.34 ( 4)	1:48.03 (10)	13:14.03 ( 5)	150.325
5	Erben Wennemars	Netherlands	35.79 ( 1)	6:29.65 (10)	1:45.19 ( 1)	13:35.67 (10)	150.601
6	Shani Davis	United States	35.84 ( 3)	6:26.20 ( 7)	1:46.10 ( 4)	13:37.33 (11)	150.712
7	Wouter olde Heuvel	Netherlands	37.12 (14)	6:20.37 ( 5)	1:48.33 (12)	13:18.38 ( 6)	151.186
8	Eskil Ervik	Norway	37.40 (16)	6:28.21 ( 9)	1:47.49 ( 7)	13:08.92 ( 3)	151.497
9	Ivan Skobrev	Russia	36.43 ( 6)	6:29.91 (11)	1:49.06 (15)	13:22.15 ( 7)	151.811
10	Denny Morrison	Canada	35.81 ( 2)	6:34.67 (15)	1:45.70 ( 2)	14:02.03 (12)	152.611
11	Johan Röjler	Sweden	37.60 (18)	6:26.96 ( 8)	1:49.35 (19)	13:24.96 ( 8)	152.994
12	Arne Dankers	Canada	38.42 (23)	6:24.29 ( 6)	1:48.29 (11)	13:25.43 ( 9)	153.216
NQ13	Steven Elm	Canada	36.66 (10)	6:39.23 (22)	1:47.60 ( 8)		112.449
NQ14	Chad Hedrick	United States	36.77 (12)	6:36.59 (17)	1:48.46 (13)		112.582
NQ15	Justin Warsylewicz	Canada	37.09 (13)	6:33.12 (12)	1:48.56 (14)		112.588
NQ16	Choi Kwun-won	South Korea	36.53 ( 8)	6:37.57 (20)	1:49.16 (14)		112.673
NQ17	Stefan Heythausen	Germany	36.44 ( 7)	6:42.60 (23)	1:47.97 ( 9)		112.690
NQ18	Sverre Haugli	Norway	37.64 (19)	6:33.87 (13)	1:49.07 (16)		113.383
NQ19	Henrik Christiansen	Norway	37.56 (17)	6:36.94 (18)	1:49.34 (18)		113.700
NQ20	Matteo Anesi	Italy	37.69 (21)	6:37.51 (19)	1:50.00 (20)		114.107
NQ21	Hiroki Hirako	Japan	37.64 (19)	6:35.50 (16)	1:51.59 (23)		114.386
NQ22	Alexis Contin	France	37.72 (22)	6:38.89 (21)	1:51.19 (22)		114.672
NQ23	Jarmo Valtonen	Finland	36.67 (11)	6:55.07 (24)	1:50.01 (21)		114.847
NQ24	Tobias Schneider	Germany	1:28.98 (24)	6:33.93 (14)	withdrew after fall		

NQ = Not qualified for the 10000 m (only the best 12 are qualified)
DQ = disqualified

Notes

- Konrad Niedźwiedzki of Poland was qualified according to the standings at the 2007 European Championships, but did not start, allowing Alexis Contin of France to take his place.
- After winning a skate-off tournament two weeks before the Championship, Erben Wennemars replaced Mark Tuitert in the Dutch team.
- Finland had a qualified skater for the first time since 1998 (when qualifying rules were less restrictive), South Korea for the first time since 1999, and France for the first time since 2001.
- 12 nations were qualified, the largest number since 2002.
- The top six from the 2006 Championship are all present. In addition, Chad Hedrick who was disqualified on the final distance in 2006 after a second place in the overall standings after three distances, participated, but did not qualify for the final distance.
- Quotas for 2008: Europe 13, North America 8, Asia 3.

== Women championships ==
=== 500 m ===
Friesinger, the three-time gold medallist from the World Championships, turned up for the first time since 2005 and did so by winning the first distance, just like in 2005 when she won all four distances. With 38.44, Wüst got her best 500 metre performance at a World Championships, while defending champion Klassen, who had then beaten all opponents by over a second at this distance, finished third.

Pos.	Race	Time	Pos.	Allround rankings	Points
1st place, gold medalist(s)	Anni Friesinger (GER)	38.38	1.	Anni Friesinger (GER)	38.380
2nd place, silver medalist(s)	Ireen Wüst (NED)	38.44	2.	Ireen Wüst (NED)	38.440
3rd place, bronze medalist(s)	Cindy Klassen (CAN)	38.66	3.	Cindy Klassen (CAN)	38.660
4.	Yekaterina Lobysheva (RUS)	38.88	4.	Yekaterina Lobysheva (RUS)	38.880
5.	Wang Fei (CHN)	39.05	5.	Wang Fei (CHN)	39.050
6.	Christine Nesbitt (CAN)	39.18	6.	Christine Nesbitt (CAN)	39.180
7.	Yekaterina Abramova (RUS)	39.68	7.	Yekaterina Abramova (RUS)	39.680
8.	Daniela Anschütz-Thoms (GER)	39.76	8.	Daniela Anschütz-Thoms (GER)	39.760
9.	Kristina Groves (CAN)	39.80	9.	Kristina Groves (CAN)	39.800
10.	Claudia Pechstein (GER)	39.82	10.	Claudia Pechstein (GER)	39.820
13.	Renate Groenewold (NED)	40.24	13.	Renate Groenewold (NED)	40.240
14.	Maki Tabata (JPN)	40.28	14.	Maki Tabata (JPN)	40.280

=== 1500 m ===
Wüst finished only a couple of hundredths of a second behind her personal best from Calgary, and beat Friesinger by more than a second, though she was alone in the ninth pair after the scheduled pairmate Groenewold withdrew with illness. Wüst's race was the fastest time ever skated in Europe. In the tenth pair, defending champion Klassen lost eight tenths of a second to Friesinger in the opening 300 metres, which she never regained, even finishing behind compatriot Nesbitt. European Champion Sáblíková finished 11th, trailing by more than four points in the overall standings, which was two points more than she had managed at the European Championships.

Pos.	Race	Time	Pos.	Allround rankings	Points
1st place, gold medalist(s)	Ireen Wüst (NED)	1:54.05	1.	Ireen Wüst (NED)	76.456
2nd place, silver medalist(s)	Anni Friesinger (GER)	1:55.90	2.	Anni Friesinger (GER)	77.013
3rd place, bronze medalist(s)	Christine Nesbitt (CAN)	1:56.08	3.	Cindy Klassen (CAN)	77.450
4.	Cindy Klassen (CAN)	1:56.37	4.	Christine Nesbitt (CAN)	77.873
5.	Paulien van Deutekom (NED)	1:56.97	5.	Wang Fei (CHN)	78.456
6.	Kristina Groves (CAN)	1:57.33	6.	Yekaterina Lobysheva (RUS)	78.750
7.	Marja Vis (NED)	1:58.02	7.	Kristina Groves (CAN)	78.910
8.	Claudia Pechstein (GER)	1:58.04	8.	Paulien van Deutekom (NED)	78.930
9.	Daniela Anschütz-Thoms (GER)	1:58.17	9.	Daniela Anschütz-Thoms (GER)	79.090
10.	Wang Fei (CHN)	1:58.22	10.	Claudia Pechstein (GER)	79.166
14.	Maki Tabata (JPN)	2:00.02	12.	Maki Tabata (JPN)	80.286

=== 3000 m ===
In the allround standings, Wüst faced Friesinger in the final pair, with a significant advantage of more than half a point before the distance. Wüst started quicker, and skated away from Friesinger on every lap, eventually finishing 3.8 seconds ahead to have more than a point in the overall classification. Only two of Wüst's laps were above 32 seconds. Klassen came in third on this distance, too, and trailed Friesinger by half a point in the fight for silver, however, the distance to any other medal contender was more than a point. Sáblíková, who won the distance at the European Championships, now skated slightly slower than in Collalbo, and her time from the sixth pair was beaten in the ninth pair by Paulien van Deutekom, who had finished tenth at the European Championships.

Pos.	Race	Time	Pos.	Allround rankings	Points
1st place, gold medalist(s)	Ireen Wüst (NED)	4:00.28	1.	Ireen Wüst (NED)	116.502
2nd place, silver medalist(s)	Anni Friesinger (GER)	4:04.00	2.	Anni Friesinger (GER)	117.679
3rd place, bronze medalist(s)	Cindy Klassen (CAN)	4:05.28	3.	Cindy Klassen (CAN)	118.330
4.	Paulien van Deutekom (NED)	4:05.35	4.	Paulien van Deutekom (NED)	119.821
5.	Martina Sáblíková (CZE)	4:05.87	5.	Christine Nesbitt (CAN)	120.061
6.	Claudia Pechstein (GER)	4:06.83	6.	Kristina Groves (CAN)	120.080
7.	Kristina Groves (CAN)	4:07.02	7.	Daniela Anschütz-Thoms (GER)	120.281
8.	Daniela Anschütz-Thoms (GER)	4:07.15	8.	Claudia Pechstein (GER)	120.304
9.	Marja Vis (NED)	4:09.12	9.	Wang Fei (CHN)	120.491
10.	Maren Haugli (NOR)	4:09.80	10.	Marja Vis (NED)	120.850
11.	Clara Hughes (CAN)	4:10.24	12.	Martina Sáblíková (CZE)	121.474
12.	Wang Fei (CHN)	4:12.21	13.	Maren Haugli (NOR)	122.439
21.	Maki Tabata (JPN)	4:18.87	14.	Maki Tabata (JPN)	123.421

=== 5000 m ===
Wüst became the youngest world allround women's champion since Karin Busch won in Inzell in 1982, after another win over Friesinger, her third in two days. The second pair saw both the winner and the runner-up on the distance, with Sábliková skating the fastest time ever in Europe, defeating the three-time Olympic gold medallist on the distance, Pechstein, by more than ten seconds. Pechstein still finished second, while Wüst took third place after a much more consistent race than in Collalbo. Friesinger finished poorly, ending in ninth place, but still beating Klassen by 2.4 seconds in the fight for the silver medal.

Pos.	Race	Time	Pos.	Allround rankings	Points
1st place, gold medalist(s)	Martina Sáblíková (CZE)	6:49.31	1.	Ireen Wüst (NED)	158.652
2nd place, silver medalist(s)	Claudia Pechstein (GER)	6:59.98	2.	Anni Friesinger (GER)	160.515
3rd place, bronze medalist(s)	Ireen Wüst (NED)	7:01.60	3.	Cindy Klassen (CAN)	160.754
4.	Maren Haugli (NOR)	7:03.19	4.	Claudia Pechstein (GER)	162.302
5.	Kristina Groves (CAN)	7:03.71	5.	Martina Sáblíková (CZE)	162.405
6.	Cindy Klassen (CAN)	7:04.11	6.	Paulien van Deutekom (NED)	162.442
7.	Paulien van Deutekom (NED)	7:06.21	7.	Kristina Groves (CAN)	162.451
8.	Daniela Anschütz-Thoms (GER)	7:06.91	8.	Daniela Anschütz-Thoms (GER)	162.972
9.	Anni Friesinger (GER)	7:08.36	9.	Christine Nesbitt (CAN)	163.711
10.	Marja Vis (NED)	7:09.74	10.	Marja Vis (NED)	163.824
11.	Christine Nesbitt (CAN)	7:16.50	11.	Wang Fei (CHN)	164.411
12.	Wang Fei (CHN)	7:19.20	12.	Maren Haugli (NOR)	164.748

=== Allround results ===
Place	Athlete	Country	500 m	1500 m	3000 m	5000 m	Points
1st place, gold medalist(s)	Ireen Wüst	NED	38.44 ( 2)	1:54.05 ( 1)	4:00.28 ( 1)	7:01.60 ( 3)	158.662
2nd place, silver medalist(s)	Anni Friesinger	GER	38.38 ( 1)	1:55.90 ( 2)	4:04.00 ( 2)	7:08.36 ( 9)	160.515
3rd place, bronze medalist(s)	Cindy Klassen	CAN	38.68 ( 3)	1:56.37 ( 4)	4:05.24 ( 3)	7:04.11 ( 6)	160.754
4	Claudia Pechstein	GER	39.82 (10)	1:58.04 ( 8)	4:06.83 ( 6)	6:59.98 ( 2)	162.302
5	Martina Sáblíková	CZE	40.96 (18)	1:58.61 (11)	4:05.87 ( 5)	6:49.31 ( 1)	162.405
6	Paulien van Deutekom	NED	39.94 (11)	1:56.97 ( 5)	4:05.35 ( 4)	7:06.21 ( 7)	162.442
7	Kristina Groves	CAN	39.80 ( 9)	1:57.33 ( 6)	4:07.02 ( 7)	7:03.71 ( 5)	162.451
8	Daniela Anschütz-Thoms	GER	39.70 ( 8)	1:58.17 ( 9)	4:07.15 ( 8)	7:06.91 ( 8)	162.972
9	Christine Nesbitt	CAN	39.18 ( 6)	1:56.08 ( 3)	4:13.13 (14)	7:16.50 (11)	163.711
10	Marja Vis	NED	39.99 (12)	1:58.02 ( 7)	4:09.12 ( 9)	7:09.74 (10)	163.824
11	Wang Fei	CHN	39.05 ( 5)	1:58.22 (10)	4:12.21 (12)	7:19.20 (12)	164.411
12	Maren Haugli	NOR	40.82 (17)	1:59.93 (13)	4:09.80 (10)	7:03.19 ( 4)	164.748
NQ13	Yekaterina Lobysheva	RUS	38.88 ( 4)	1:59.61 (12)	4:14.55 (15)		121.175
NQ14	Maki Tabata	JPN	40.28 (14)	2:00.02 (14)	4:18.81 (21)		123.421
NQ15	Lucille Opitz	GER	41.22 (23)	2:00.66 (15)	4:12.40 (13)		123.506
N16	Maria Lamb	USA	40.35 (15)	2:01.33 (17)	4:17.37 (19)		123.688
NQ17	Clara Hughes	CAN	41.86 (23)	2:01.11 (16)	4:10.24 (11)		123.936
NQ18	Yekaterina Abramova	RUS	39.68 ( 7)	2:02.74 (21)	4:20.74 (22)		124.049
NQ19	Masako Hozumi	JPN	41.03 (19)	2:01.53 (18)	4:16.41 (17)		124.275
NQ20	Catherine Raney	USA	41.18 (21)	2:02.14 (20)	4:14.86 (16)		124.369
NQ21	Galina Likhachova	RUS	40.79 (16)	2:01.95 (19)	4:23.50 (23)		125.356
NQ22	Eriko Ishino	JPN	41.14 (20)	2:03.69 (23)	4:17.96 (20)		125.363
NQ23	Andrea Jirků	CZE	42.40 (24)	2:03.03 (22)	4:16.87 (18)		126.221
NQ24	Renate Groenewold	NED	40.24 (13)	withdrew after fall			

NQ = Not qualified for the 5000 m (only the best 12 are qualified)
DQ = disqualified

Notes

- Katarzyna Wójcicka of Poland was qualified, but did not start, allowing Galina Likhachova of Russia to participate.
- Anni Friesinger, who skipped the 2007 European Championships to prepare for the World Sprint Championships a week later, replaced Katrin Mattscherodt in the German team.
- The Czech Republic had two women qualified for the first time.
- Nine of the top ten skaters from the 2006 Championships were present; the number eight in 2006, Tessa van Dijk, failed to qualify for the Dutch team.
- Quotas for 2008: Europe 14, North America 6, Asia 4

== Rules ==
All 24 participating skaters are allowed to skate the first three distances; 12 skaters may take part on the fourth distance. These 12 skaters are determined by taking the standings on the longest of the first three distances, as well as the samalog standings after three distances, and comparing these lists as follows:

1. Skaters among the top 12 on both lists are qualified.
2. To make up a total of 12, skaters are then added in order of their best rank on either list. Samalog standings take precedence over longest-distance standings in the event of a tie.

== External link and reference ==
- ISU World Allround Speedskating Championships, official site
