= World record progression team pursuit speed skating men =

The world record progression of the men's speed skating team pursuit over eight laps as recognised by the International Skating Union:

Country	Team	Time	Date	Event	Place	Ref
United States	Chad Hedrick; Derek Parra; K. C. Boutiette	3:48.56	13 November 2004	World Cup	Hamar, Norway	
Netherlands	Mark Tuitert; Carl Verheijen; Erben Wennemars	3:46.44	21 November 2004	World Cup	Berlin, Germany	
Canada	Arne Dankers; Steven Elm; Denny Morrison	3:39.69	12 November 2005	World Cup	Calgary, Canada	
Netherlands	Sven Kramer; Carl Verheijen; Erben Wennemars	3:37.80	11 March 2007	World Single Distance Championships	Salt Lake City, United States	
Netherlands	Jan Blokhuijsen; Sven Kramer; Koen Verweij	3:37.17	9 November 2013	World Cup	Calgary, Canada	
Netherlands	Jan Blokhuijsen; Sven Kramer; Koen Verweij	3:35.60	16 November 2013	World Cup	Salt Lake City, United States	
Netherlands	Douwe de Vries; Sven Kramer; Marcel Bosker	3:34.68	15 February 2020	World Single Distances Championships	Salt Lake City, United States	
United States	Joey Mantia; Emery Lehman; Casey Dawson	3:34.47	5 December 2021	2021–22 World Cup	Salt Lake City, United States	
Norway	Sander Eitrem; Peder Kongshaug; Sverre Lunde Pedersen	3:34.22	5 January 2024	2024 European Championships	Heerenveen, Netherlands	
United States	Casey Dawson; Emery Lehman; Ethan Cepuran	3:33.66	27 January 2024	2023–24 World Cup	Salt Lake City, United States	
United States	Casey Dawson; Emery Lehman; Ethan Cepuran	3:32.49	16 November 2025	2025–26 World Cup	Salt Lake City, United States	
