= 2008 World Single Distance Speed Skating Championships =

World Single Distance Speed Skating Championships
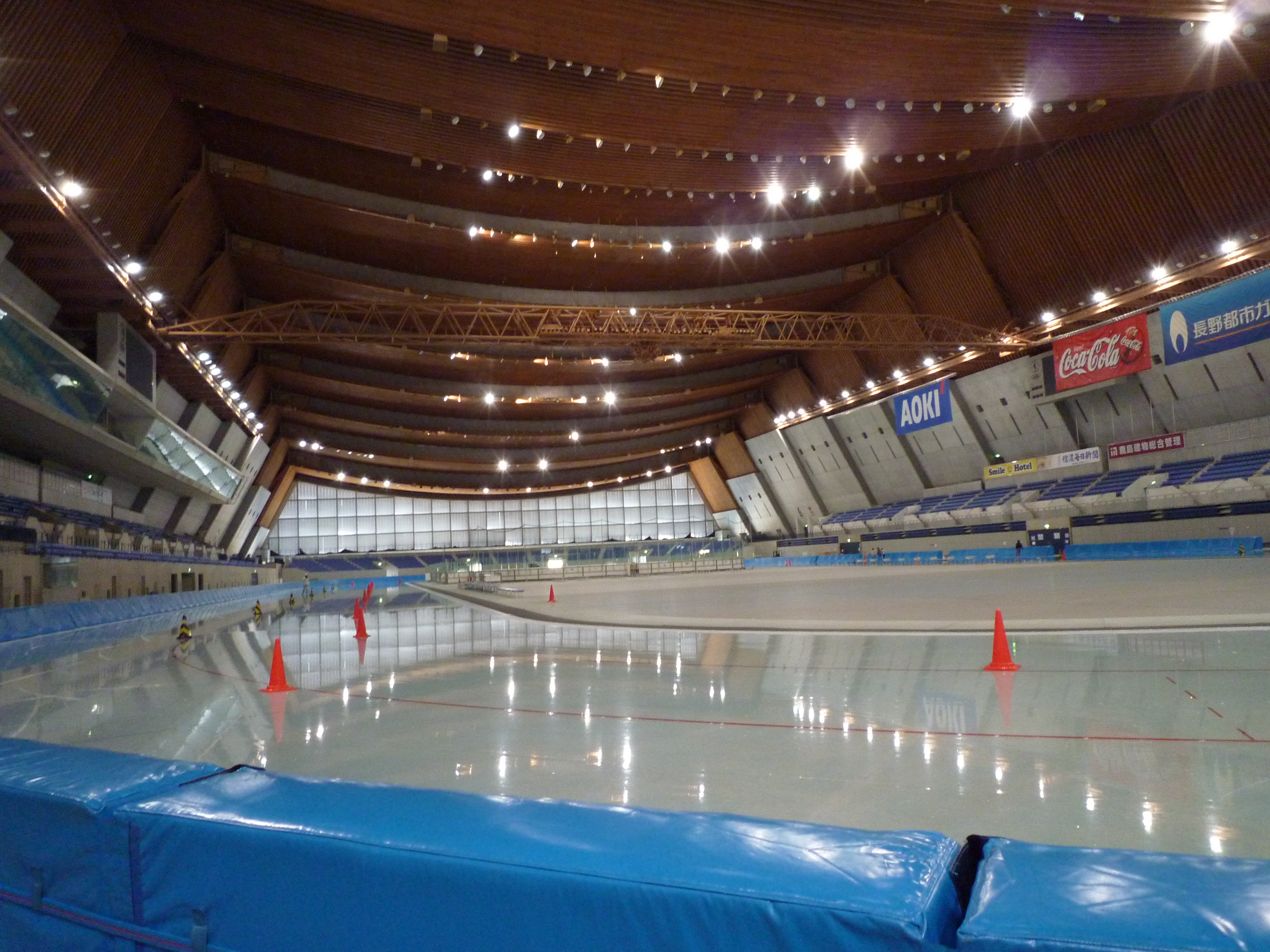
- M-Wave (Nagano)
- Venue: M-Wave (Nagano)
- Dates: 6–9 March 2008

The 2008 World Single Distance Speed Skating Championships were held between 6 March and 9 March 2008 in the M-Wave, Nagano, Nagano.

== Schedule ==
Date	Events
6 March	1500 m women
6 March	5000 m men
7 March	500 m men (1st)
7 March	3000 m women
7 March	500 m men (2nd)
8 March	500 m women (1st)
8 March	1000 m men
8 March	500 m women (2nd)
8 March	10000 m men
8 March	Team pursuit women
9 March	1000 m women
9 March	1500 m men
9 March	5000 m women
9 March	Team pursuit men

== Medal summary ==
=== Men's events ===
Event	Gold		Silver		Bronze	
500 m	Jeremy Wotherspoon; Canada	69.460; 34.78; 34.68 TR	Lee Kyou-hyuk; South Korea	70.010; 35.11; 34.90	Joji Kato; Japan	70.320; 35.25; 35.07
1000 m	Shani Davis; United States	1:08.99 TR	Yevgeni Lalenkov; Russia	1:09.39	Denny Morrison; Canada	1:09.43
1500 m	Denny Morrison; Canada	1:45.22 TR	Sven Kramer; Netherlands; Shani Davis; United States	1:45.32		
5000 m	Sven Kramer; Netherlands	6:17.24 TR	Enrico Fabris; Italy	6:20.22	Wouter olde Heuvel; Netherlands	6:24.05
10000 m	Sven Kramer; Netherlands	12:57.71 TR	Enrico Fabris; Italy	13:18.81	Bob de Jong; Netherlands	13:25.01
Team pursuit	Netherlands; Sven Kramer; Wouter olde Heuvel; Erben Wennemars	3:41.69	Italy; Enrico Fabris; Matteo Anesi; Luca Stefani	3:46.76	Germany; Jörg Dallmann; Stefan Heythausen; Marco Weber	3:47.71

Note: TR = Track record

=== Women's events ===
Event	Gold		Silver		Bronze	
500 m	Jenny Wolf; Germany	75.630; 37,89; 37,74 TR	Wang Beixing; China	76,260; 38,18; 38,10	Annette Gerritsen; Netherlands	77,200; 38,72; 38,48
1000 m	Anni Friesinger; Germany	1:15.37 TR	Kristina Groves; Canada	1:16.01	Annette Gerritsen; Netherlands	1:16.35
1500 m	Anni Friesinger; Germany	1:56.06 TR	Paulien van Deutekom; Netherlands	1:57.36	Kristina Groves; Canada	1:57.63
3000 m	Kristina Groves; Canada	4.05,03 TR	Paulien van Deutekom; Netherlands	4.05,49	Daniela Anschütz-Thoms; Germany	4.05,76
5000 m	Martina Sáblíková; Czech Republic	6:58.22 TR	Clara Hughes; Canada	7:04.79	Kristina Groves; Canada	7:04.94
Team pursuit	Netherlands; Paulien van Deutekom; Renate Groenewold; Ireen Wüst	3.02,19	Canada; Kristina Groves; Christine Nesbitt; Brittany Schussler	3.02,87	Germany; Daniela Anschütz-Thoms; Claudia Pechstein; Lucille Opitz	3.07,57

Note: TR = Track record

=== Medal table ===
Rank	Nation	Gold	Silver	Bronze	Total
1	Netherlands (NED)	4	3	4	11
2	Canada (CAN)	3	3	3	9
3	Germany (GER)	3	0	3	6
4	United States (USA)	1	1	0	2
5	Czech Republic (CZE)	1	0	0	1
6	Italy (ITA)	0	3	0	3
7	China (CHN)	0	1	0	1
7	Russia (RUS)	0	1	0	1
7	South Korea (KOR)	0	1	0	1
10	Japan (JPN)	0	0	1	1
Totals (10 entries)		12	13	11	36
