= Erben Wennemars =

Dutch speed skater

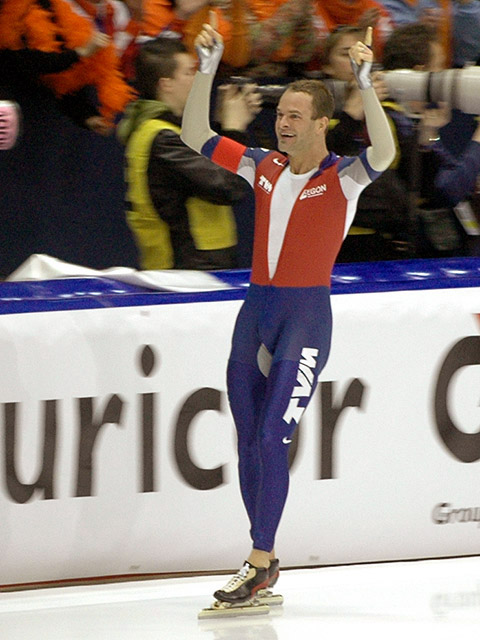
- Wennemars at the 2007; World Allround Championships

Personal information
- Born: 1 November 1975 (age 50) Dalfsen, Netherlands
- Website: www.erbenwennemars.nl

Sport
- Country: Netherlands
- Sport: Speed skating
- Turned pro: 1995
- Retired: 2010
Medal record
Men's speed skating
Representing the Netherlands
Olympic Games
Bronze medal – third place	2006 Turin	Team pursuit
Bronze medal – third place	2006 Turin	1000 m
World Single Distance Championships
Gold medal – first place	2003 Berlin	1000 m
Gold medal – first place	2004 Seoul	1000 m
Gold medal – first place	2003 Berlin	1500 m
Gold medal – first place	2005 Inzell	Team pursuit
Gold medal – first place	2007 Salt Lake City	Team pursuit
Gold medal – first place	2008 Nagano	Team pursuit
Silver medal – second place	1999 Heerenveen	500 m
Silver medal – second place	2007 Salt Lake City	1500 m
Bronze medal – third place	2003 Berlin	500 m
Bronze medal – third place	2001 Salt Lake City	1500 m
Bronze medal – third place	2004 Seoul	1500 m
World Sprint Championships
Gold medal – first place	2004 Nagano	Sprint
Gold medal – first place	2005 Salt Lake City	Sprint
Bronze medal – third place	1998 Berlin	Sprint
Bronze medal – third place	2003 Calgary	Sprint

Egbert Rolf "Erben" Wennemars (born 1 November 1975) is a Dutch former speed skater. He specialized in the sprint and middle distances of 500, 1000 and 1500 meters, and set six world records during his career.

== Speed skating career ==
Wennemars was the first skater who skated the 1500 m faster than 1:50.00. His 1:49.89 in the summer of 1997, however, was not regarded as an official world record.

During the 1998 Winter Olympics in Nagano, Japan, where Wennemars was qualified for the 500, 1000 and 1500 m, he dislocated his shoulder when Grunde Njøs from Norway fell and collided with Wennemars during the second 500 m race. Wennemars was not able to participate in the other distances after that.

Wennemars achieved his first big success in 2003 during the World Single Distance Championships in Berlin, Germany, by winning the gold medal at the 1000 m and 1500 m. One year later he became world champion in sprint in Nagano. In 2005 he defended his world sprint title successfully in Salt Lake City, United States.

Wennemars qualified for the 500 m, 1000 m, 1500 m and the team pursuit events at the 2006 Winter Olympics in Turin, Italy and won bronze medals on the 1000m and in the team pursuit. His teammates for the team pursuit were Sven Kramer, Carl Verheijen, Mark Tuitert and Rintje Ritsma.

In 2003, Wennemars was chosen as athlete of the year in the Netherlands, and in 2003, 2004 and 2005 as Dutch skater of the year. After failing to qualify for the 2010 Winter Olympics, he announced his farewell from competitive skating. On 11 January 2010, Wennemars officially retired as a speed-skating professional. His son, Joep Wennemars became World Sprint Champion in 2025.

=== Records ===
==== Personal records ====
Personal records
Men's speed skating
Event	Result	Date	Location	Notes
500 m	34.68	22 January 2005	Utah Olympic Oval, Salt Lake City	
1000 m	1:07.33	12 January 2003	Utah Olympic Oval, Salt Lake City	
1500 m	1:42.32	9 November 2007	Utah Olympic Oval, Salt Lake City	World record until beaten by Denny Morrison on 14 March 2008. Dutch record until beaten by Koen Verweij on 15 November 2013.
3000 m	3:41.84	12 August 2005	Olympic Oval, Calgary	
5000 m	6:28.42	13 August 2005	Olympic Oval, Calgary	
10000 m	13:35.67	11 February 2007	Thialf, Heerenveen	
Small comb.	146.365	12–13 August 2005	Olympic Oval, Calgary	Current world record.
Team pursuit	3:37.80	11 March 2007	Utah Olympic Oval, Salt Lake City	World record (with Sven Kramer and Carl Verheijen) until beaten by Jan Blokhuijsen, Sven Kramer and Koen Verweij on 16 November 2013.

==== World records ====
World records
Men's speed skating
Event	Result	Date	Location	Notes
1500 m	1:42.32	9 November 2007	Utah Olympic Oval, Salt Lake City	World record until beaten by Denny Morrison on 14 March 2008. Dutch record until beaten by Koen Verweij on 15 November 2013.
Small comb.	153.583	15–16 August 1998	Olympic Oval, Calgary	World record until beaten by Steven Elm on 27–29 November 1998.
Small comb.	149.188	14–15 August 1999	Olympic Oval, Calgary	World record until beaten by Jochem Uytdehaage on 15–17 March 2001.
Small comb.	146.365	12–13 August 2005	Olympic Oval, Calgary	Current world record.
Team pursuit	3:46.44	21 November 2004	Sportforum Hohenschönhausen, Berlin	World record (with Mark Tuitert and Carl Verheijen) until beaten by Arne Dankers, Steven Elm and Denny Morrison on 12 November 2005.
Team pursuit	3:37.80	11 March 2007	Utah Olympic Oval, Salt Lake City	World record (with Sven Kramer and Carl Verheijen) until beaten by Jan Blokhuijsen, Sven Kramer and Koen Verweij on 16 November 2013.

== Tournament overview ==
Season	Dutch Championships Single Distances	Dutch Championships Sprint	Dutch Championships Allround	World Championships Allround	World Championships Sprint	World Championships Single Distances	Olympic Games	World Cup GWC	World Championships Junior Allround
1994–95	THE HAGUE 16th 500m 14th 1000m								SEINÄJOKI 25th 500m 31st 1500m 14th 1000m DNQ 5000m NC overall(24th)
1995–96	GRONINGEN DQ 500m 6th 1000m 5th 1500m	ASSEN 14th 500m 7th 1000m 11th 500m 7th 1000m 10th overall							
1996–97	THE HAGUE (silver) 500m (gold) 1000m (silver) 1500m	GRONINGEN 4th 500m (bronze) 1000m 4th 500m 4th 1000m (bronze) overall						22nd 500m 28th 1000m	
1997–98	HEERENVEEN (silver) 500m (gold) 1000m (bronze) 1500m	GRONINGEN (silver) 500m (bronze) 1000m (bronze) 500m 4th 1000m (silver) overall			BERLIN 9th 500m 6th 1000m 6th 500m (silver) 1000m (bronze) overall		NAGANO DNF 500m	10th 500m 7th 1000m	
1998–99	GRONINGEN (bronze) 500m 4th 1000m 7th 1500m 20th 5000m	GRONINGEN (bronze) 500m 5th 1000m (silver) 500m (gold) 1000m (bronze) overall			CALGARY 13th 500m 4th 1000m 5th 500m (bronze) 1000m 5th overall	HEERENVEEN (silver) 500m 4th 1000m		14th 500m 5th 1000m 18th 1500m	
1999–2000	DEVENTER (gold) 500m (gold) 1000m 7th 1500m	UTRECHT 16th 500m (bronze) 1000m (gold) 500m (bronze) 1000m 4th overall			SEOUL 4th 500m 5th 1000m 4th 500m (bronze) 1000m 5th overall	NAGANO 10th 500m 6th 1000m		6th 500m 4th 1000m	
2000–01	THE HAGUE (gold) 500m (gold) 1000m (bronze) 1500m	HEERENVEEN (gold) 500m (gold) 1000m (gold) 500m (gold) 1000m (gold) overall			INZELL 4th 500m (bronze) 1000m 15th 500m (gold) 1000m 5th overall	SALT LAKE CITY 18th 500m 6th 1000m (bronze) 1500m		10th 500m 5th 1000m 4th 1500m	
2001–02	GRONINGEN (silver) 500m (bronze) 1000m 4th 1500m	GRONINGEN (bronze) 500m 4th 1000m (gold) 500m (bronze) 1000m (bronze) overall			HAMAR 8th 500m 6th 1000m 6th 500m (silver) 1000m 5th overall		SALT LAKE CITY 10th 500m 5th 1000m	10th 500m 5th 1000m (silver) 1500m	
2002–03	UTRECHT (gold) 500m (gold) 1000m (gold) 1500m				CALGARY 4th 500m (gold) 1000m 5th 500m (silver) 1000m (bronze) overall	BERLIN (bronze) 500m (gold) 1000m (gold) 1500m		(silver) 500m (gold) 1000m (bronze) 1500m	
2003–04	HEERENVEEN (silver) 500m (gold) 1000m (gold) 1500m	UTRECHT (bronze) 500m (gold) 1000m (gold) 500m (gold) 1000m (gold) overall			NAGANO 9th 500m (gold) 1000m 7th 500m (gold) 1000m (gold) overall	SEOUL 11th 500m (gold) 1000m (bronze) 1500m		11th 500m (gold) 1000m (silver) 1500m	
2004–05	ASSEN (bronze) 500m (silver) 1000m (silver) 1500m	GRONINGEN 23rd 500m (bronze) 1000m 4th 500m (gold) 1000m 21st overall			SALT LAKE CITY 4th 500m 4th 1000m (bronze) 500m (gold) 1000m (gold) overall	INZELL 9th 500m 9th 1000m 7th 1500m (gold) team pursuit		9th 500m (gold) 1000m (silver) 1500m	
2005–06	HEERENVEEN (bronze) 500m (silver) 1000m (silver) 1500m	ASSEN 6th 500m 6th 1000m 5th 500m 4th 1000m 4th overall					TURIN 16th 500m (bronze) 1000m 5th 1500m (bronze) team pursuit	27th 500m 8th 1000m 8th 1500m (bronze) team pursuit	
2006–07	ASSEN (bronze) 500m 7th 1000m 4th 1500m	GRONINGEN 5th 500m (bronze) 1000m (bronze) 500m (gold) 1000m (gold) overall	HEERENVEEN (gold) 500m 12th 5000m (gold) 1500m 8th 10000m (bronze) overall	HEERENVEEN (gold) 500m 10th 5000m (gold) 1500m 10th 10000m 5th overall	HAMAR 6th 500m (bronze) 1000m 13th 500m 4th 1000m 6th overall	SALT LAKE CITY 14th 500m 4th 1000m (silver) 1500m (gold) team pursuit		27th 100m 13th 500m (gold) 1000m (gold) 1500m (gold) team pursuit	
2007–08	HEERENVEEN (bronze) 500m (bronze) 1000m (silver) 1500m	HEERENVEEN 15th 500m (silver) 1000m (silver) 500m 4th 1000m 5th overall				NAGANO (gold) team pursuit		41st 100m 27th 500m 9th 1000m 4th 1500m (gold) team pursuit	
2008–09	HEERENVEEN 15th 500m (silver) 1000m 4th 1500m	GRONINGEN 5th 500m (silver) 1000m 6th 500m (bronze) 1000m (silver) overall	HEERENVEEN (gold) 500m 14th 5000m (bronze) 1500m 8th 10000m 5th overall		MOSCOW DNF 500m DNS 1000m DNS 500m DNS 1000m NC overall			25th 1000m 10th 1500m 7th team pursuit	
2009–10	HEERENVEEN 11th 500m 9th 1000m 5th 1500m							26th 1500m (silver) team pursuit	
2013–14	HEERENVEEN 15th 1500m								

DNS = Did not start
DNF = Did not finish
DQ = Disqualified
NC = No classification

== World Cup ==
Season	100 meter*		
1996–1997			
1997–1998			
1998–1999			
1999–2000			
2000–2001			
2001–2002			
2002–2003			
2003–2004			
2004–2005			
2005–2006			
2006–2007	27th	21st	15th
2007–2008	25th	–	–
2008–2009			
2009–2010			

Season	500 meter													
1996–1997	36th	30th	18th(b)	17th(b)	24th(b)	12th(b)	17th(b)	23rd(b)	1st(b)	13th	2nd(b)	14th		
1997–1998	9th	4th	9th	13th	2nd place, silver medalist(s)	–	–							
1998–1999	24th	7th	–	–	5th	2nd place, silver medalist(s)	–	16th	13th					
1999–2000	16th	9th	14th	6th	4th	4th	4th	4th	9th					
2000–2001	15th	14th	15th	7th	6th	4th	7th	10th	19th	–				
2001–2002	14th	6th	10th	–	–	13th	5th	14th	19th	2nd place, silver medalist(s)				
2002–2003	10th	7th	4th	5th	–	3rd place, bronze medalist(s)	3rd place, bronze medalist(s)	3rd place, bronze medalist(s)	6th	1st place, gold medalist(s)	1st place, gold medalist(s)			
2003–2004	5th	2nd place, silver medalist(s)	14th	8th	8th	12th	–	–	12th	12th	12th	10th		
2004–2005	16th	14th	7th	8th	1st place, gold medalist(s)	8th	10th	10th	15th	9th				
2005–2006	58th	17th	–	–	7th(b)	17th(b)	–	–	1st(b)	6th	–	–		
2006–2007	27th	DQ	7th	13th*	11th*	9th*	14th	16th	14th	4th	8th	16th	–	
2007–2008	13th	18th	18th	19th	3rd(b)*	–	17th	18th	–	–	–	–	–	–
2008–2009														
2009–2010														

Season	1000 meter									
1996–1997	26th	19th	18th(b)	9th(b)	7th(b)	19th(b)	14th(b)	18th(b)	1st(b)	
1997–1998	4th	6th	7th	10th	4th	–	–			
1998–1999	5th	7th	–	–	4th	5th	5th	4th	4th	
1999–2000	11th	5th	4th	3rd place, bronze medalist(s)	14th	7th	6th	3rd place, bronze medalist(s)	9th	
2000–2001	10th	13th	5th	9th	2nd place, silver medalist(s)	5th	2nd place, silver medalist(s)	1st place, gold medalist(s)	11th	14th
2001–2002	5th	2nd place, silver medalist(s)	19th	2nd place, silver medalist(s)	3rd place, bronze medalist(s)	6th	20th			
2002–2003	1st place, gold medalist(s)	4th	3rd place, bronze medalist(s)	1st place, gold medalist(s)	2nd place, silver medalist(s)	1st place, gold medalist(s)	6th	1st place, gold medalist(s)	1st place, gold medalist(s)	
2003–2004	1st place, gold medalist(s)	1st place, gold medalist(s)	1st place, gold medalist(s)	1st place, gold medalist(s)	3rd place, bronze medalist(s)	2nd place, silver medalist(s)	2nd place, silver medalist(s)	2nd place, silver medalist(s)		
2004–2005	1st place, gold medalist(s)	15th	4th	2nd place, silver medalist(s)	1st place, gold medalist(s)	1st place, gold medalist(s)	1st place, gold medalist(s)	2nd place, silver medalist(s)	3rd place, bronze medalist(s)	
2005–2006	5th	2nd place, silver medalist(s)	–	–	5th	–	–	9th	2nd place, silver medalist(s)	–
2006–2007	3rd place, bronze medalist(s)	4th	1st place, gold medalist(s)	2nd place, silver medalist(s)	2nd place, silver medalist(s)	3rd place, bronze medalist(s)	3rd place, bronze medalist(s)	2nd place, silver medalist(s)	2nd place, silver medalist(s)	7th
2007–2008	5th	9th	11th	3rd place, bronze medalist(s)	DQ	5th	7th	–	–	11th
2008–2009	8th	4th (silver)	5th	4th	–	–	–	DNF	–	–
2009–2010										

Season	1500 meter						
1996–1997							
1997–1998							
1998–1999	–	1st(b)	–	7th	–		
1999–2000							
2000–2001	5th	1st place, gold medalist(s)	19th	5th	20th		
2001–2002	3rd place, bronze medalist(s)	5th	–	2nd place, silver medalist(s)	2nd place, silver medalist(s)	4th	
2002–2003	2nd place, silver medalist(s)	4th	–	1st place, gold medalist(s)	3rd place, bronze medalist(s)	–	
2003–2004	1st place, gold medalist(s)	2nd place, silver medalist(s)	4th	4th	2nd place, silver medalist(s)		
2004–2005	2nd place, silver medalist(s)	3rd place, bronze medalist(s)	9th	3rd place, bronze medalist(s)	3rd place, bronze medalist(s)		
2005–2006	8th	3rd place, bronze medalist(s)	7th	11th			
2006–2007	1st place, gold medalist(s)	2nd place, silver medalist(s)	1st place, gold medalist(s)	2nd place, silver medalist(s)	2nd place, silver medalist(s)	2nd place, silver medalist(s)	
2007–2008	1st place, gold medalist(s)	4th	1st place, gold medalist(s)	8th	6th	10th	10th
2008–2009	2nd place, silver medalist(s)	5th	4th	–	–	–	
2009–2010	18th	1st(b)	–	–	DQ		

Season	Team pursuit			
1996–1997				
1997–1998				
1998–1999				
1999–2000				
2000–2001				
2001–2002				
2002–2003				
2003–2004				
2004–2005				
2005–2006	3rd place, bronze medalist(s)	–	–	
2006–2007	1st place, gold medalist(s)	–	–	
2007–2008	–	1st place, gold medalist(s)	2nd place, silver medalist(s)	–
2008–2009	DNF	–	–	
2009–2010	–	–	4th	

(b) = Division B
DNF = Did not finish
DQ = Disqualified
* = 100m (first 100 meters of the World Cup 500 meter)
– = Did not participate

== Medals won ==
Championship	Gold (gold)	Silver (silver)	Bronze (bronze)
Dutch Single Distances	11	11	9
Dutch Sprint Single Events	12	5	13
Dutch Sprint	3	2	3
Dutch Allround Single Events	3	0	1
Dutch Allround Classification	0	0	1
World Allround Single Events	2	0	0
World Allround Classification	0	0	0
Olympic Games	0	0	2
World Single Distances	6	2	3
World Sprint Single Events	5	3	5
World Sprint Classification	2	0	2
World Cup	27	32	20
World Cup Classification	7	4	2
Total	77	60	61

Total number of medals: 198

== Personal life ==
Wennemars is married to TV-presenter Renate van der Zalm, with whom he has two sons: Joep and Niels. Joep, like his father, is also a skater. On the other hand, Niels is a cheese-rolling racer, winning one of the races at Cooper's Hill in 2026.

Records
Preceded by (United States) Shani Davis	Men's 1500 m speed skating world record 9 November 2007 – 14 March 2008	Succeeded by (Canada) Denny Morrison
Preceded by (Netherlands) Carl Verheijen (Germany) Christian Breuer (Netherlands) Jochem Uytdehaage	Men's small combination speed skating world record 16 August 1998 – 29 November 1998; 15 August 1999 – 17 March 2001; 13 August 2005 – present	Succeeded by (Canada) Steven Elm (Netherlands) Jochem Uytdehaage; Current holder
Preceded by (United States) K. C. Boutiette, Chad Hedrick, Derek Parra (Canada) Arne Dankers, Steven Elm, Denny Morrison	Men's team pursuit speed skating world record 21 November 2004 – 12 November 2005 with Mark Tuitert and Carl Verheijen; 11 March 2007 – 9 November 2003 with Sven Kramer and Carl Verheijen	Succeeded by (Canada) Arne Dankers, Steven Elm, Denny Morrison (Netherlands) Jan Blokhuijsen, Sven Kramer, Koen Verweij
Awards
Preceded by Jochem Uytdehaage	Dutch Sportsman of the Year; 2003	Succeeded by Pieter van den Hoogenband
Preceded by Jochem Uytdehaage	Ard Schenk Award; 2003, 2004, 2005	Succeeded by Bob de Jong
