= Ushiyama =

Ushiyama is a surname. Notable people with the surname include:

- Shigeru Ushiyama (born 1952), Japanese actor
- Takahiro Ushiyama (born 1981), Japanese speed skater
