= Speed skating at the 2006 Winter Olympics – Women's 1000 metres =

Women's 1000 metres at the XX Olympic Winter Games
- Pictogram for speed skating
- Venue: Oval Lingotto
- Dates: 19 February 2006
- Competitors: 36 from 12 nations
- Winning time: 1:16.05

Medalists
1st place, gold medalist(s)		Marianne Timmer; Netherlands
2nd place, silver medalist(s)		Cindy Klassen; Canada
3rd place, bronze medalist(s)		Anni Friesinger; Germany

The Women's 1000 m speed skating competition for the 2006 Winter Olympics was held in Turin, Italy.

== Records ==
Prior to this competition, the existing world and Olympic records were as follows.

World record	Chris Witty (USA)	1:13.83	Salt Lake City, United States	17 February 2002
Olympic record	Chris Witty (USA)	1:13.83	Salt Lake City, United States	17 February 2002

No new world or Olympic records were set during this competition.

== Results ==
Rank	Pair	Name	Country	Time	Time behind	Notes
1	11	Marianne Timmer	Netherlands	1:16.05		
2	8	Cindy Klassen	Canada	1:16.09	+0.04	
3	18	Anni Friesinger	Germany	1:16.11	+0.06	
4	17	Ireen Wüst	Netherlands	1:16.36	+0.31	
5	11	Kristina Groves	Canada	1:16.54	+0.49	
6	6	Barbara De Loor	Netherlands	1:16.73	+0.68	
7	13	Svetlana Zhurova	Russia	1:17.13	+1.08	
8	2	Katarzyna Wójcicka	Poland	1:17.28	+1.23	
9	4	Yekaterina Abramova	Russia	1:17.33	+1.28	
10	16	Jennifer Rodriguez	United States	1:17.47	+1.42	
11	3	Varvara Barysheva	Russia	1:17.52	+1.47	
11	14	Yekaterina Lobysheva	Russia	1:17.52	+1.47	
13	17	Chiara Simionato	Italy	1:17.53	+1.48	
14	15	Christine Nesbitt	Canada	1:17.54	+1.49	
15	12	Sayuri Yoshii	Japan	1:17.58	+1.53	
16	10	Tomomi Okazaki	Japan	1:17.63	+1.58	
17	5	Maki Tabata	Japan	1:17.64	+1.59	
17	7	Aki Tonoike	Japan	1:17.64	+1.59	
19	1	Lee Sang-hwa	South Korea	1:17.78	+1.73	
20	15	Wang Manli	China	1:17.90	+1.85	
21	18	Sabine Völker	Germany	1:17.97	+1.97	
22	2	Judith Hesse	Germany	1:17.98	+1.98	
23	9	Annette Gerritsen	Netherlands	1:18.33	+2.28	
24	12	Shannon Rempel	Canada	1:18.35	+2.30	
25	6	Amy Sannes	United States	1:18.50	+2.45	
26	1	Lee Ju-yeon	South Korea	1:18.66	+2.61	
27	13	Chris Witty	United States	1:18.70	+2.65	
28	10	Kim Yoo-rim	South Korea	1:18.77	+2.72	
29	16	Wang Beixing	China	1:19.03	+2.98	
30	7	Pamela Zoellner	Germany	1:19.30	+3.25	
31	8	Zhang Shuang	China	1:19.91	+3.86	
32	9	Elli Ochowicz	United States	1:19.94	+3.89	
33	5	Svetlana Radkevich	Belarus	1:20.11	+4.06	
34	4	Lee Bo-ra	South Korea	1:21.19	+5.14	
35	3	Daniela Oltean	Romania	1:21.70	+5.65	
	14	Ren Hui	China	DNF		
