= Netherlands at the 2006 Winter Olympics =

- Flag of the Netherlands
- IOC code: NED
- NOC: Dutch Olympic Committee*; Dutch Sports Federation
- Website: www.nocnsf.nl (in Dutch)

in Turin
- Competitors: 33 (16 men, 17 women) in 4 sports
- Flag bearer (opening): Jan Bos (speedskating)
- Flag bearer (closing): Rintje Ritsma (speedskating)
- Medals Ranked 10th: Gold 3 Silver 2 Bronze 4 Total 9

Winter Olympics appearances (overview)
- 1928; 1932; 1936; 1948; 1952; 1956; 1960; 1964; 1968; 1972; 1976; 1980; 1984; 1988; 1992; 1994; 1998; 2002; 2006; 2010; 2014; 2018; 2022; 2026

Athletes from the Netherlands competed at the 2006 Winter Olympics in Turin, Italy. The team of 35 competed in speed skating, bobsleigh, short track speed skating and snowboarding. The Dutch flag bearer during the opening ceremony was speedskater Jan Bos.

Historically, the Dutch have only won medals in skating; of their 78 Winter Olympic medals since 1952, 75 have been won in speed skating, and a further three in figure skating. The Netherlands have not won a figure skating medal since 1976.

Dirk Matschenz (skeleton) did meet the limits set by the Dutch Olympic Committee but did not participate because he did not get his Dutch passport before the start of the Olympics. Matschenz is originally from Germany.

== Medalists ==
Medal	Name	Sport	Event
Gold	Ireen Wüst	Speed skating	Women's 3000 metres
Gold	Marianne Timmer	Speed skating	Women's 1000 metres
Gold	Bob de Jong	Speed skating	Men's 10,000 metres
Silver	Sven Kramer	Speed skating	Men's 5000 metres
Silver	Renate Groenewold	Speed skating	Women's 3000 metres
Bronze	Sven Kramer; Rintje Ritsma; Mark Tuitert; Carl Verheijen; Erben Wennemars	Speed skating	Men's team pursuit
Bronze	Erben Wennemars	Speed skating	Men's 1000 metres
Bronze	Ireen Wüst	Speed skating	Women's 1500 metres
Bronze	Carl Verheijen	Speed skating	Men's 10,000 metres

== Bobsleigh ==
Athlete	Event	Final					
Athlete	Event	Run 1	Run 2	Run 3	Run 4	Total	Rank
Ilse Broeders; Jeanette Pennings	Two-woman	1:00.13	did not start				
Arend Glas; Sybren Jansma	Two-man	56.70	56.54	56.95	57.15	3:47.36	19
Eline Jurg; Kitty van Haperen	Two-woman	58.05	58.08	58.42	58.35	3:52.90	11
Arend Glas; Sybren Jansma; Arno Klaassen; Vincent Kortbeek	Four-man	55.82	56.08	55.78	55.51	3:43.19	16

== Short track speed skating ==
Athlete	Event	Heat		Quarterfinal		Semifinal		Final	
Athlete	Event	Time	Rank	Time	Rank	Time	Rank	Time	Rank
Cees Juffermans	Men's 500 m	42.849	3 Q	42.515	3	did not advance			11
Cees Juffermans	Men's 1500 m	2:27.696	2 Q	—N/a		DNF		did not advance	16
Niels Kerstholt	Men's 1000 m	disqualified		did not advance					
Niels Kerstholt	Men's 1500 m	2:23.854	2 Q	—N/a		2:21.748	3	Final B 2:24.962	10
Liesbeth Mau Asam	Women's 500 m	45.500	3	did not advance					15
Liesbeth Mau Asam	Women's 1000 m	1:38.039	2 Q	1:34.034	3	did not advance			10
Liesbeth Mau Asam	Women's 1500 m	2:28.910	2 Q	—N/a		2:26.370	6	did not advance	14

== Snowboarding ==
Two women were selected for the Netherlands in snowboarding events in Torino; Cheryl Maas for the halfpipe event and Nicolien Sauerbreij in the parallel giant slalom event. Maas qualified in 4th place for the final, but on her final run, Maas landed on the top edge of the halfpipe, fell and ended up in 11th.

Halfpipe

Athlete	Event	Qualifying Run 1		Qualifying Run 2		Final		
Athlete	Event	Points	Rank	Points	Rank	Run 1	Run 2	Rank
Cheryl Maas	Women's halfpipe	38.6	4 Q	n/a		(8.7)	16.5	11

Note: In the final, the single best score from two runs is used to determine the ranking. A bracketed score indicates a run that wasn't counted.

Parallel GS

Athlete	Event	Qualification		Round of 16	Quarterfinals	Semifinals	Finals	
Athlete	Event	Time	Rank	Opposition time	Opposition time	Opposition time	Opposition time	Rank
Nicolien Sauerbreij	Women's parallel giant slalom	1:22.17	12	Kober (GER) (1); L +0.03 (-1.50 +1.53)	did not advance			12

Key: '+ Time' represents a deficit; the brackets indicate the results of each run.

== Speed skating ==
Men

Athlete	Event	Race 1	Race 2	Final	
Athlete	Event	Race 1	Race 2	Time	Rank
Jan Bos	500 m	35.68	35.43	1:11.11	11
Jan Bos	1000 m	n/a		1:09.42	5
Jan Bos	1500 m	n/a		1:48.61	20
Bob de Jong	5000 m	n/a		6:22.12	6
Bob de Jong	10000 m	n/a		13:01.57	Gold medal
Stefan Groothuis	1000 m	n/a		1:09.57	8
Sven Kramer	1500 m	n/a		1:48.36	15
Sven Kramer	5000 m	n/a		6:16.40	Silver medal
Sven Kramer	10000 m	n/a		13:18.14	7
Simon Kuipers	500 m	36.10	35.74	1:11.84	23
Simon Kuipers	1500 m	n/a		1:46.58	4
Beorn Nijenhuis	500 m	48.84	35.71	1:24.55	35
Beorn Nijenhuis	1000 m	n/a		1:09.85	12
Carl Verheijen	5000 m	n/a		6:18.84	4
Carl Verheijen	10000 m	n/a		13:08.80	Bronze medal
Erben Wennemars	500 m	35.46	35.84	1:11.30	16
Erben Wennemars	1000 m	n/a		1:09.32	Bronze medal
Erben Wennemars	1500 m	n/a		1:46.71	5

Women

Athlete	Event	Race 1	Race 2	Final	
Athlete	Event	Race 1	Race 2	Time	Rank
Barbara De Loor	1000 m	n/a		1:16.73	6
Annette Gerritsen	500 m	39.12	38.97	1:18.09	12
Annette Gerritsen	1000 m	n/a		1:18.33	23
Renate Groenewold	1500 m	n/a		1:59.33	9
Renate Groenewold	3000 m	n/a		4:03.48	Silver medal
Renate Groenewold	5000 m	n/a		7:11.32	9
Carien Kleibeuker	5000 m	n/a		7:12.18	10
Moniek Kleinsman	3000 m	n/a		4:13.81	17
Marianne Timmer	500 m	disqualified			
Marianne Timmer	1000 m	n/a		1:16.05	Gold medal
Marianne Timmer	1500 m	n/a		2:00.45	14
Paulien van Deutekom	1500 m	n/a		2:00.15	13
Sanne van der Star	500 m	39.26	39.33	1:18.59	14
Ireen Wüst	1000 m	n/a		1:16.39	4
Ireen Wüst	1500 m	n/a		1:56.90	Bronze medal
Ireen Wüst	3000 m	n/a		4:02.43	Gold medal

Team Pursuit

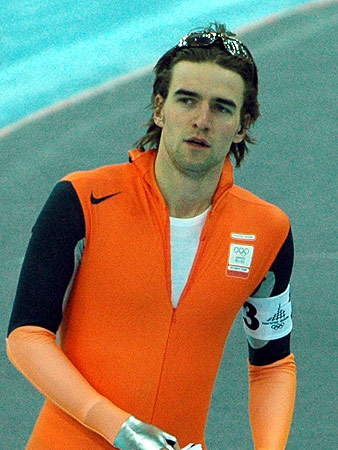
Mark Tuitert

Athlete	Event	Seeding		Quarterfinal	Semifinal	Final	
Athlete	Event	Time	Rank	Opposition time	Opposition time	Opposition time	Rank
Sven Kramer; Rintje Ritsma; Mark Tuitert; Carl Verheijen; Erben Wennemars	Men's team pursuit	3:48.02	3	Russia (6); W 3:44.65	Italy (2); L Overtaken	Bronze final Norway (4); W 3:44.53	Bronze medal
Paulien van Deutekom; Renate Groenewold; Moniek Kleinsman; Gretha Smit; Ireen Wüst	Women's team pursuit	3:06.67	4	Germany (5); L 3:03.65	did not advance	5th place final United States (6); L 3:05.62	6

== Further references ==
- (in Dutch) Gekwalificeerde sporters Olympische Spelen 2006, from the Dutch Olympic Committee, retrieved 23 January 2006
