= Claudiu Grozea =

Romanian speed skater

Personal information
- Nationality: Romanian
- Born: 14 October 1982 (age 42); Ploiești, Romania

Sport
- Sport: Speed skating

Claudiu Grozea (born 14 October 1982) is a Romanian speed skater. He competed in the men's 5000 metres event at the 2006 Winter Olympics.
