= Speed skating at the 2006 Winter Olympics =

Speed skating at the XX Olympic Winter Games
- Venue: Oval Lingotto
- Dates: 11–25 February 2006
- No. of events: 12
- Competitors: 175 from 19 nations

Speed skating at the 2006 Winter Olympics was held over ten days, from 11 to 25 February. Twelve events were contested at the Oval Lingotto.

== Medal summary ==
=== Men's events ===
Event	Gold		Silver		Bronze	
500 metres	Joey Cheek; United States	69.76	Dmitry Dorofeyev; Russia	70.41	Lee Kang-seok; South Korea	70.43
1000 metres	Shani Davis; United States	1:08.89	Joey Cheek; United States	1:09.16	Erben Wennemars; Netherlands	1:09.32
1500 metres	Enrico Fabris; Italy	1:45.97	Shani Davis; United States	1:46.13	Chad Hedrick; United States	1:46.22
5000 metres	Chad Hedrick; United States	6:14.68	Sven Kramer; Netherlands	6:16.40	Enrico Fabris; Italy	6:18.25
10,000 metres	Bob de Jong; Netherlands	13:01.57	Chad Hedrick; United States	13:05.40	Carl Verheijen; Netherlands	13:08.80
Team pursuit	Italy; Matteo Anesi; Stefano Donagrandi*; Enrico Fabris; Ippolito Sanfratello	3:44.46	Canada; Arne Dankers; Steven Elm; Denny Morrison*; Jason Parker*; Justin Warsylewicz	3:47.28	Netherlands; Sven Kramer; Rintje Ritsma*; Mark Tuitert; Carl Verheijen; Erben Wennemars*	3:44.53 (Final B)

* Skaters who did not participate in the final, but received medals.

=== Women's events ===
Event	Gold		Silver		Bronze	
500 metres	Svetlana Zhurova; Russia	76.57	Wang Manli; China	76.78	Ren Hui; China	76.87
1000 metres	Marianne Timmer; Netherlands	1:16.05	Cindy Klassen; Canada	1:16.09	Anni Friesinger; Germany	1:16.11
1500 metres	Cindy Klassen; Canada	1:55.27	Kristina Groves; Canada	1:56.74	Ireen Wüst; Netherlands	1:56.90
3000 metres	Ireen Wüst; Netherlands	4:02.43	Renate Groenewold; Netherlands	4:03.48	Cindy Klassen; Canada	4:04.37
5000 metres	Clara Hughes; Canada	6:59.07	Claudia Pechstein; Germany	7:00.08	Cindy Klassen; Canada	7:00.57
Team pursuit	Germany; Daniela Anschütz-Thoms; Anni Friesinger; Lucille Opitz*; Claudia Pechstein; Sabine Völker*	3:01.25	Canada; Kristina Groves; Clara Hughes; Cindy Klassen*; Christine Nesbitt; Shannon Rempel*	3:02.91	Russia; Yekaterina Abramova; Varvara Barysheva*; Galina Likhachova*; Yekaterina Lobysheva; Svetlana Vysokova	Overtook (Final B)

* Skaters who did not participate in the final, but received medals.

== Medal table ==
Rank	Nation	Gold	Silver	Bronze	Total
1	United States	3	3	1	7
2	Netherlands	3	2	4	9
3	Canada	2	4	2	8
4	Italy	2	0	1	3
5	Germany	1	1	1	3
5	Russia	1	1	1	3
7	China	0	1	1	2
8	South Korea	0	0	1	1
Totals (8 entries)		12	12	12	36

== Records ==
The combination of low altitude and high humidity at the Oval Lingotto in Turin created fairly slow ice conditions, relative to previous Olympic ovals, such as the Utah Olympic Oval. This meant that no world records in speed skating were set at the Games, and the only Olympic records set were in the two debut events, the men's and women's team pursuits.

Event	Date	Round	Team	Time	OR	WR
Men's team pursuit	15 February	Heat 1	Germany; Stefan Heythausen; Robert Lehmann; Tobias Schneider	3:49.59	OR	
Men's team pursuit	15 February	Heat 3	Netherlands; Rintje Ritsma; Mark Tuitert; Carl Verheijen	3:48.02	OR	
Men's team pursuit	15 February	Heat 4	Canada; Arne Dankers; Steven Elm; Denny Morrison	3:47.37	OR	
Men's team pursuit	15 February	Quarterfinals	Netherlands; Sven Kramer; Carl Verheijen; Erben Wennemars	3:44.65	OR	
Men's team pursuit	15 February	Quarterfinals	Italy; Matteo Anesi; Enrico Fabris; Ippolito Sanfratello	3:43.64	OR	
Women's team pursuit	15 February	Heat 1	Norway; Annette Bjelkevik; Hedvig Bjelkevik; Maren Haugli	3:06.34	OR	
Women's team pursuit	15 February	Heat 3	Russia; Yekaterina Abramova; Galina Likhachova; Yekaterina Lobysheva	3:05.93	OR	
Women's team pursuit	15 February	Quarterfinals	Canada; Kristina Groves; Cindy Klassen; Christine Nesbitt	3:01.24	OR	

== Participating NOCs ==
Nineteen nations competed in the speed skating events at Torino.

- Austria (1)
- Belarus (1)
- Belgium (1)
- Canada (18)
- China (15)
- Czech Republic (1)
- Finland (4)
- Germany (13)
- Italy (8)
- Japan (19)
- Kazakhstan (4)
- South Korea (14)
- Netherlands (20)
- Norway (10)
- Poland (5)
- Romania (2)
- Russia (19)
- Sweden (2)
- United States (18)
