= 2007 World Single Distance Speed Skating Championships =

World Single Distance Speed Skating Championships
- Venue: Utah Olympic Oval (Kearns)
- Dates: March 8–11, 2007

The 2007 World Single Distance Speed Skating Championships were held between March 8 and March 11, 2007, in the Utah Olympic Oval. Twelve events were held, and world records were broken in five events.

== Schedule ==
Date	Events
March 8	1500 m women
March 8	5000 m men
March 9	500 m men (1st)
March 9	3000 m women
March 9	500 m men (2nd)
March 10	500 m women (1st)
March 10	1000 m men
March 10	500 m women (2nd)
March 10	10000 m men
March 10	Team pursuit women
March 11	1000 m women
March 11	1500 m men
March 11	5000 m women
March 11	Team pursuit men

== Medal summary ==
=== Men's events ===
Event	Gold		Silver		Bronze	
500 m	Lee Kang-seok; South Korea	68.690 (34.44–34.25 WR)	Yuya Oikawa; Japan	69.020 (34.45–34.57)	Tucker Fredricks; United States	69.030 (34.48–34.55)
1000 m	Shani Davis; United States	1:07.28	Denny Morrison; Canada	1:07.30	Lee Kyou-hyuk; South Korea	1:07.51
1500 m	Shani Davis; United States	1:42.39	Erben Wennemars; Netherlands	1:42.80	Denny Morrison; Canada	1:42.88
5000 m	Sven Kramer; Netherlands	6:10.70	Enrico Fabris; Italy	6:12.53	Carl Verheijen; Netherlands	6:15.21
10000 m	Sven Kramer; Netherlands	12:41.69 WR	Carl Verheijen; Netherlands	13:00.46	Brigt Rykkje; Netherlands	13:06.03
Team pursuit	Netherlands; Sven Kramer; Carl Verheijen; Erben Wennemars	3:37.80 WR	Canada; Arne Dankers; Denny Morrison; Justin Warsylewicz	3:38.31	Russia; Yevgeny Lalenkov; Ivan Skobrev; Aleksey Yunin	3:41.23

=== Women's events ===
Event	Gold		Silver		Bronze	
500 m	Jenny Wolf; Germany	74.420 (37.38–37.04 WR)	Wang Beixing; China	74.530 (37.24–37.29)	Sayuri Osuga; Japan	75.200 (37.69–37.51)
1000 m	Ireen Wüst; Netherlands	1:13.83	Anni Friesinger; Germany	1:14.26	Christine Nesbitt; Canada	1:14.44
1500 m	Ireen Wüst; Netherlands	1:52.71	Cindy Klassen; Canada	1:53.40	Kristina Groves; Canada	1:54.39
3000 m	Martina Sáblíková; Czech Republic	3:58.09	Renate Groenewold; Netherlands	3:58.41	Cindy Klassen; Canada	3:58.50
5000 m	Martina Sáblíková; Czech Republic	6:45.61 WR	Claudia Pechstein; Germany	6:50.79	Kristina Groves; Canada	6:58.41
Team pursuit	Canada; Kristina Groves; Christine Nesbitt; Shannon Rempel	2:58.15	Netherlands; Ireen Wüst; Renate Groenewold; Paulien van Deutekom	2:59.18	Germany; Claudia Pechstein; Daniela Anschütz-Thoms; Lucille Opitz	2:59.38

== Medal table ==
Rank	Nation	Gold	Silver	Bronze	Total
1	Netherlands (NED)	5	4	2	11
2	United States (USA)	2	0	1	3
3	Czech Republic (CZE)	2	0	0	2
4	Canada (CAN)	1	3	5	9
5	Germany (GER)	1	2	1	4
6	South Korea (KOR)	1	0	1	2
7	Japan (JPN)	0	1	1	2
8	China (CHN)	0	1	0	1
8	Italy (ITA)	0	1	0	1
10	Russia (RUS)	0	0	1	1
Totals (10 entries)		12	12	12	36
