= Jason Parker (speed skater) =

Canadian speed skater

Olympic medal record

Men's Speed skating
Silver medal – second place	2006 Turin	Team Pursuit

Jason Parker (born May 13, 1975 in Yorkton, Saskatchewan) is a Canadian speed skater who won a silver medal in the Team Pursuit at the 2006 Winter Olympics.
