= Clay Mull =

American speed skater

Personal information
- Born: September 29, 1979 (age 46) Charlotte, North Carolina, U.S.
- Height: 185 cm (6 ft 1 in)
- Weight: 77 kg (170 lb)

Sport
- Sport: Speedskating
- Coached by: Tom Cushman

Clay Mull (born September 29, 1979) is an American Olympic speed skater who competed in the team pursuit at the 2006 Winter Olympics.

A 1998 South Point High graduate, first came to prominence as an inline skater as a youth, finishing second in the U.S. Junior Olympic Roller Skating Championships in the 14-15 age group in 1995. He became a speed skater after graduating from high school, and narrowly missed making the U.S. Olympic team in 2002. Mull placed sixth at the 2006 Torino Olympic Games as part of the team pursuit in speed skating.

Personal records
Men's speed skating
Event	Result	Date	Location	Notes
500 m	37.08	2005-01-08	Salt Lake City, Utah	
1000 m	1:11.77	2005-11-12	Salt Lake City, Utah	
1500 m	1:46.27	2005-12-30	Salt Lake City, Utah	
3000 m	3:46.24	2001-11-24	Calgary	
5000 m	6:29.61	2005-12-28	Salt Lake City, Utah	
10000 m	13:56.63	2001-12-22	Salt Lake City, Utah	
