= Artyom Detyshev =

Russian speed skater

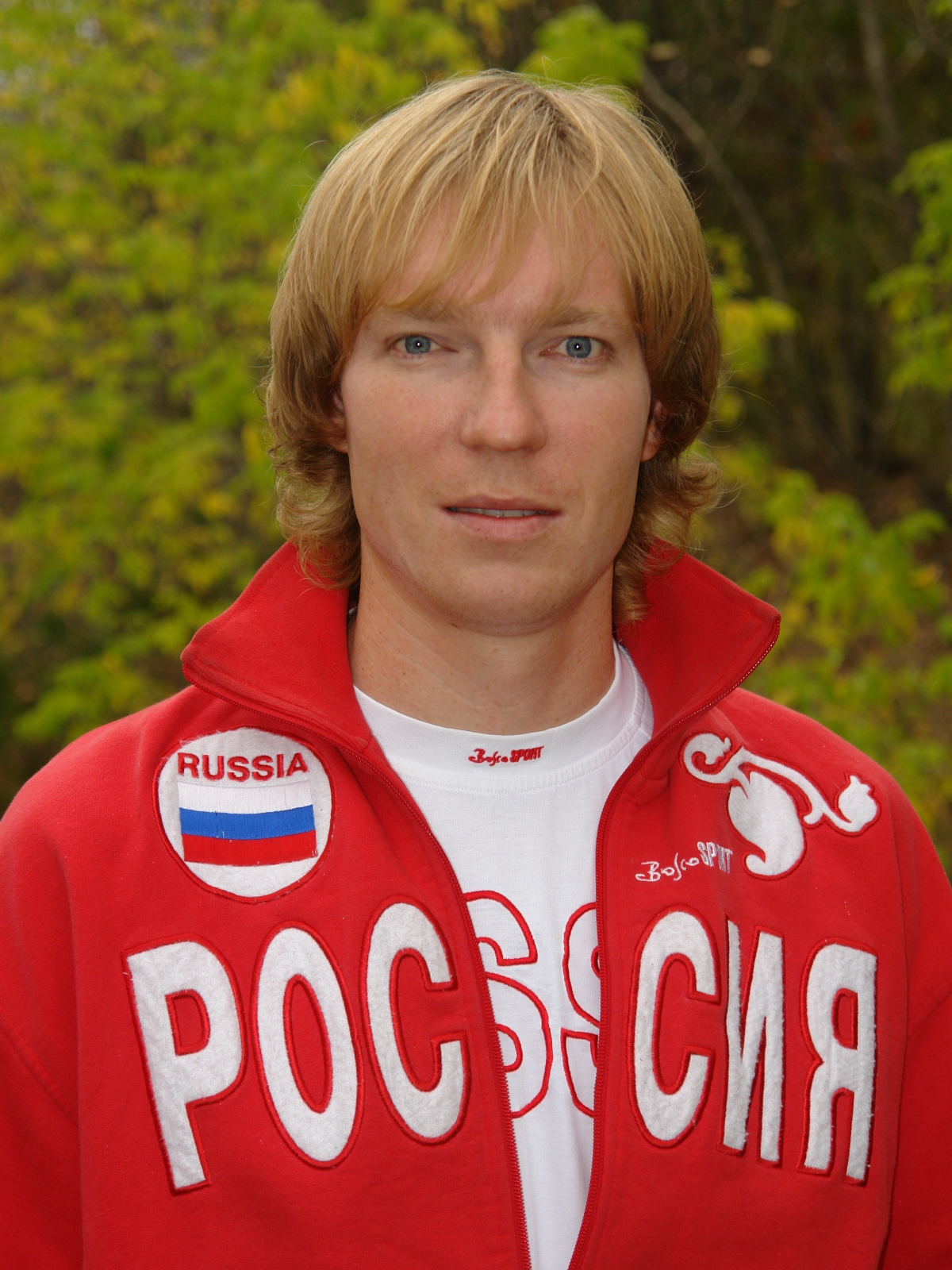

Personal information
- Full name: Artyom Aleksandrovich Detyshev
- Nationality: Russian
- Born: 21 July 1978 (age 47) Angarsk, Russia

Sport
- Sport: Speed skating

Artyom Aleksandrovich Detyshev (Russian: Артём Александрович Детышев; born 21 July 1978) is a Russian former speed skater. He competed in three events at the 2006 Winter Olympics.
