= Johan Röjler =

Swedish speed skater (born 1981)

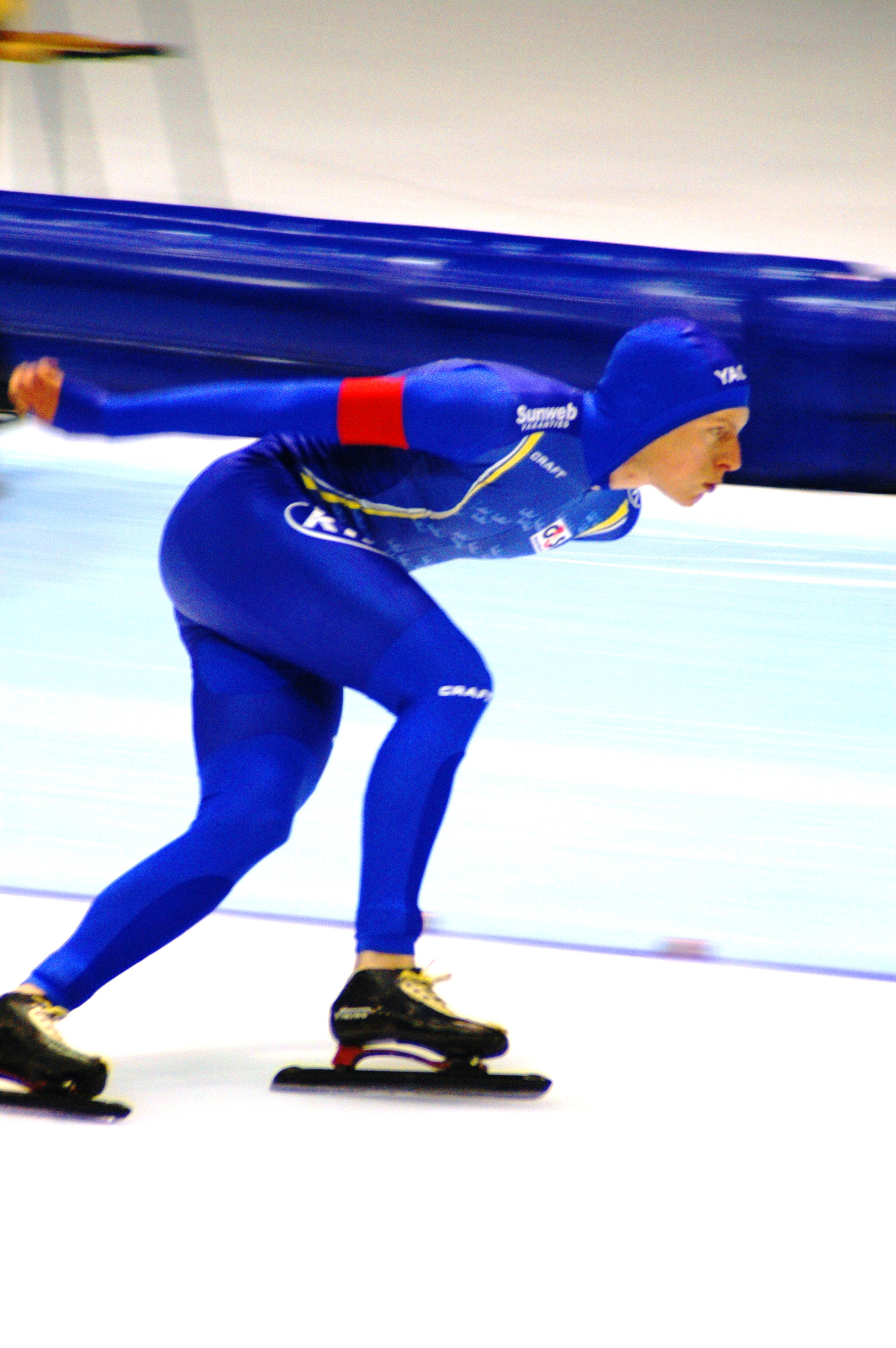
- Röjler during the 2007 ISU World Championships in Heerenveen

Personal information
- Nationality: Swedish
- Born: 11 November 1981 (age 44) Örebro, Sweden

Sport
- Country: Sweden
- Sport: speed skating
- Club: SK Winner

Johan Röjler (born 11 November 1981) is an ice speed skater from Sweden, who represented his native country in three consecutive Winter Olympics, starting in 2002 in Salt Lake City. His main achievements were held as a junior, when he won the Men's Allround Junior World Championship title in they year 2000 and took several medals, including 6 golds at Junior Nordic Games.
