= Takahiro Ushiyama =

Japanese speed skater (born 1981)

Personal information
- Nationality: Japanese
- Born: 1 May 1981 (age 45) Nagano, Japan

Sport
- Sport: Speed skating

Takahiro Ushiyama (born 1 May 1981) is a Japanese speed skater. He competed in four events at the 2006 Winter Olympics.
