= Ippolito Sanfratello =

Italian speed skater

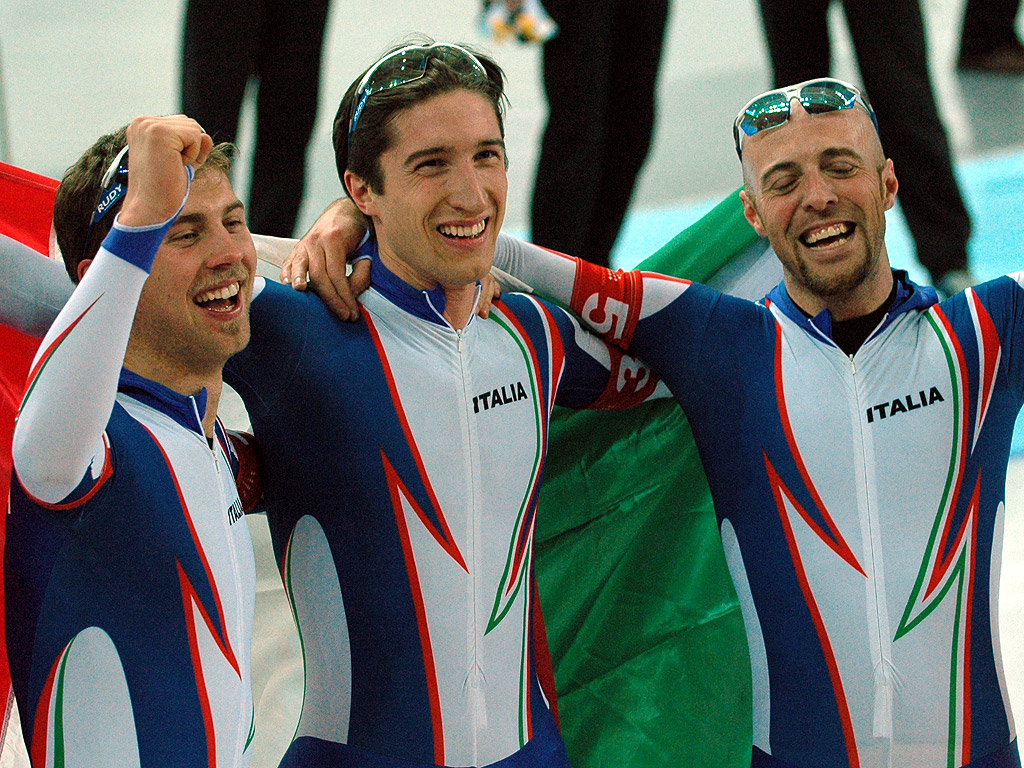
- Ippolito Sanfratello (right) with Matteo Anesi and Enrico Fabris

Personal information
- Nationality: Italian
- Born: 11 March 1973 (age 53) Piacenza, Italy
- Height: 1.80 m (5 ft 11 in)
- Weight: 77 kg (170 lb)

Sport
- Country: Italy
- Sport: Speed skating
- Retired: 2006

Achievements and titles
- Personal best(s): 500 m 36.59 (2005); 1000 m: 1:12.00 (2006); 1500 m: 1:46.13 (2006); 3000 m: 3:46.54 (2005); 5000 m: 6:16.27 (2005); 10 000 m: 13:18.98 (2005)
Medal record
Men's speed skating
Representing Italy
Olympic Games
Gold medal – first place	2006 Turin	Team pursuit
World Championships
Silver medal – second place	2005 Inzell	Team pursuit

Ippolito Sanfratello (born 11 March 1973) is an ice speed skater from Italy, who won the gold medal in the Team Pursuit at the 2006 Winter Olympics. He placed 18th in the 1500m, 14th in the 5000m and 12th in the 10000m.

== Records ==
Personal records
Men's speed skating
Event	Result	Date	Location	Notes
500 m	36.59	March 18, 2006	Calgary	
1500 m	1:46.13	March 18, 2006	Calgary	
5000 m	6:16.26	November 19, 2005	Salt Lake City	{{{5}}}
10000 m	13:18.98	December 4, 2005	Calgary	
