= Enrico Fabris =

Italian speed skater (born 1981)

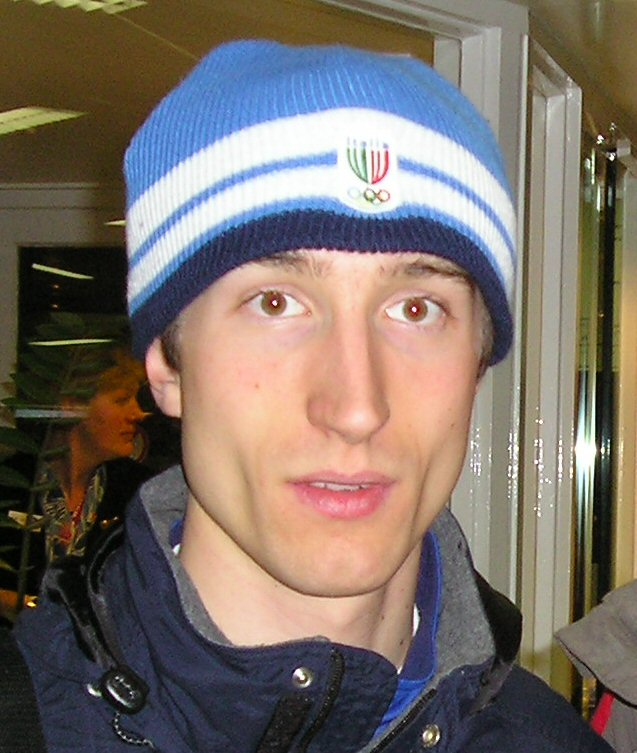
- Fabris at a 2006 World Cup in Thialf (Heerenveen, The Netherlands)

Personal information
- Born: 5 October 1981 (age 44) Asiago, Vicenza, Italy
- Height: 1.88 m (6 ft 2 in)
- Weight: 80 kg (176 lb)

Sport
- Country: Italy
- Sport: Speed skating
- Club: Fiamme Oro
- Coached by: Maurizio Marchetto

Achievements and titles
- Personal bests: 500 m: 35.99 (2006); 1000 m: 1:09.68 (2006); 1500 m: 1:43.68 (2007); 3000 m: 3:40.23 (2007); 5000 m: 6:06.09 (2006); 10 000 m: 13:10.60 (2006)
Medal record
Men's speed skating
Olympic Games
Gold medal – first place	2006 Turin	Team pursuit
Gold medal – first place	2006 Turin	1500 m
Bronze medal – third place	2006 Turin	5000 m
World Single Distances Championships
Silver medal – second place	2005 Inzell	Team pursuit
Silver medal – second place	2007 Salt Lake City	5000 m
Silver medal – second place	2008 Nagano	5000 m
Silver medal – second place	2008 Nagano	10000 m
Silver medal – second place	2008 Nagano	Team pursuit
World Allround Championships
Silver medal – second place	2006 Calgary	Allround
Silver medal – second place	2007 Heerenveen	Allround
Bronze medal – third place	2009 Hamar	Allround
European Championships
Gold medal – first place	2006 Hamar	Allround
Silver medal – second place	2007 Collalbo	Allround
Silver medal – second place	2010 Hamar	Allround
Bronze medal – third place	2008 Kolomna	Allround

Enrico Fabris (born 5 October 1981) is an Italian former long track speed skater who has won three World Cup races and became the first European Allround Champion from Italy when he won the 2006 European Championships one month before the Winter Olympics in Turin. In 2007 he won also the silver medal and in 2008 the bronze medal. Fabris is also a six-time Italian Allround Champion.

== Career ==
At the 2006 Olympics he won a bronze medal in the men's 5,000 m event, Italy's first-ever Olympic medal in speed skating. Five days later, he was in the winning team on the team pursuit event, to claim Italy's first Olympic speed skating gold. With a time of one minute, 45.97 seconds in the 1,500 m race, Fabris claimed his third medal and defeated American favourites Shani Davis and Chad Hedrick to become the first non-American to win an individual men's event through the first four races of the Turin Winter Games. On 10 November 2007 he took the 5,000 meter world record with 6:07.40, which he lost one week later, when Sven Kramer skated faster in Calgary.

== Records ==
=== Personal records ===
Distance	Time (min:sec.dec)	Place	Date
500 m	35.99	Calgary-Olympic Oval	18 Mar 2006
1,000 m	1:09.68	Turin-Oval Lingotto	20 Jan 2007
1,500 m	1:43.68	Salt Lake City-Kearns	9 Nov 2007
3,000 m	3:40.23	Calgary-Olympic Oval	5 Nov 2007
5,000 m	6:06.06	Salt Lake City-Kearns	12 Dec 2009
10,000 m	13:10.60	Calgary-Olympic Oval	19 Mar 2006

As of 2019, he is in 12th position in the Adelskalender with 146.619 points.

Source: SpeedskatingResults.com

=== World records ===
Event	Time	Date	Venue
5000 m	6:07.40	November 10, 2007	(United States) Salt Lake City

Source: SpeedSkatingStats.com

== See also ==
- Legends of Italian sport - Walk of Fame
- List of multiple Olympic gold medalists at a single Games
