= Stefan Heythausen =

German speed skater

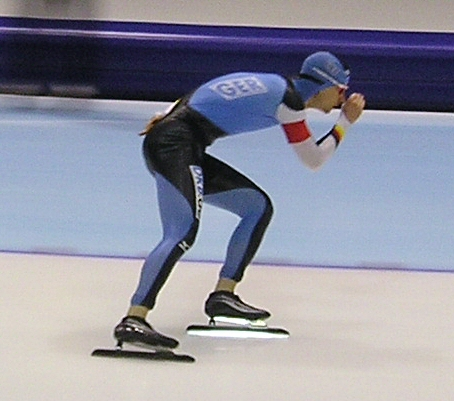
- Stefan Heythausen in 2007

Personal information
- Nationality: German
- Born: 27 May 1981 (age 43); Nettetal, Germany

Sport
- Sport: Speed skating

Stefan Heythausen (born 27 May 1981) is a German speed skater. He competed in two events at the 2006 Winter Olympics.
