= Stefano Donagrandi =

Italian speed skater (born 1976)

Personal information
- Born: 1 September 1976 (age 49) Bormio, Italy
- Height: 1.84 m (6 ft 1/2 in)
- Weight: 74 kg (163 lb)

Sport
- Country: Italy
- Sport: Speed skating
- Club: Fiamme Oro
Medal record
Olympic Games
Representing Italy
| Gold medal – first place | 2006 Turin | Team Pursuit |

Stefano Donagrandi (born 1 September 1976) is an ice speed skater from Italy, who won the gold medal in the Team Pursuit at the 2006 Winter Olympics. He placed 22nd in the 1500 m event, 13th in the 10000 m event, and 16th in 5000 m.
