= Justin Warsylewicz =

Canadian speed skater

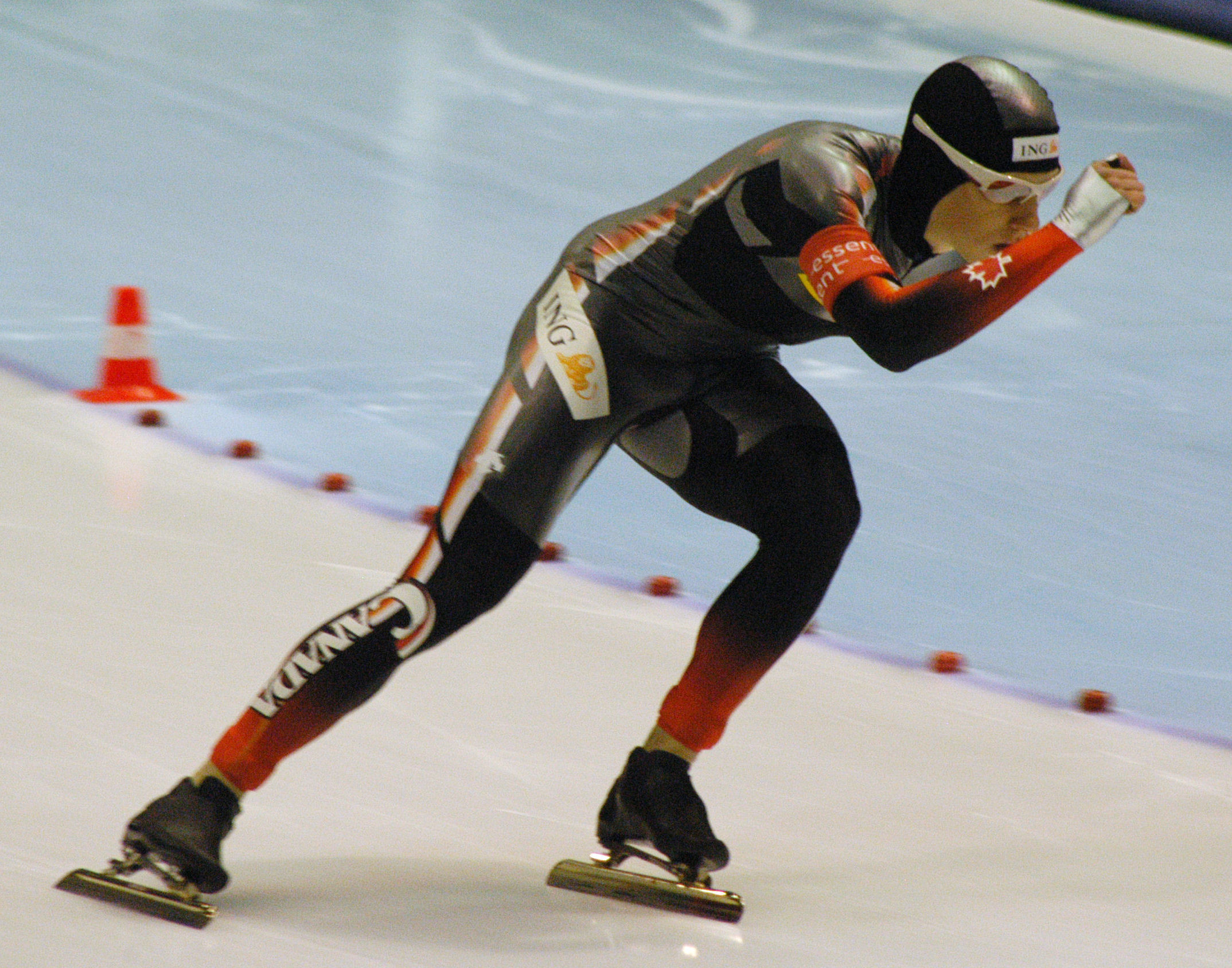
- Warsylewicz in 2008

Personal information
- Born: 19 October 1985 (age 40) Regina, Saskatchewan, Canada
Medal record
Men's speed skating
Representing Canada
Olympic Games
Silver medal – second place	2006 Turin	Team pursuit
World Single Distance Championships
Silver medal – second place	2007 Salt Lake City	Team pursuit

Justin Warsylewicz (born 19 October 1985 in Regina, Saskatchewan) is a Canadian speedskater.

In February 2004, at the age of eighteen, he became Canadian All Round Champion after winning the World Junior Championships earlier that year. His win left the talented Dutchman Sven Kramer behind him in second place. The student of kinesiology missed the first half of the 2004/2005 season when he was diagnosed with a heart irregularity. This required catheter ablation procedures performed by Dr. L. Brent Mitchell at the Foothills Medical Centre in Calgary on November 17 and December 8. Successful outcomes of the procedures allowed Justin to compete in the Canadian All Round Championship at the end of December, and successfully defended his national title. Justin subsequently participated in the 2006 Winter Olympics in Turin, winning a silver medal in men's team pursuit speed skating.
