= Steven Elm =

Canadian speed skater

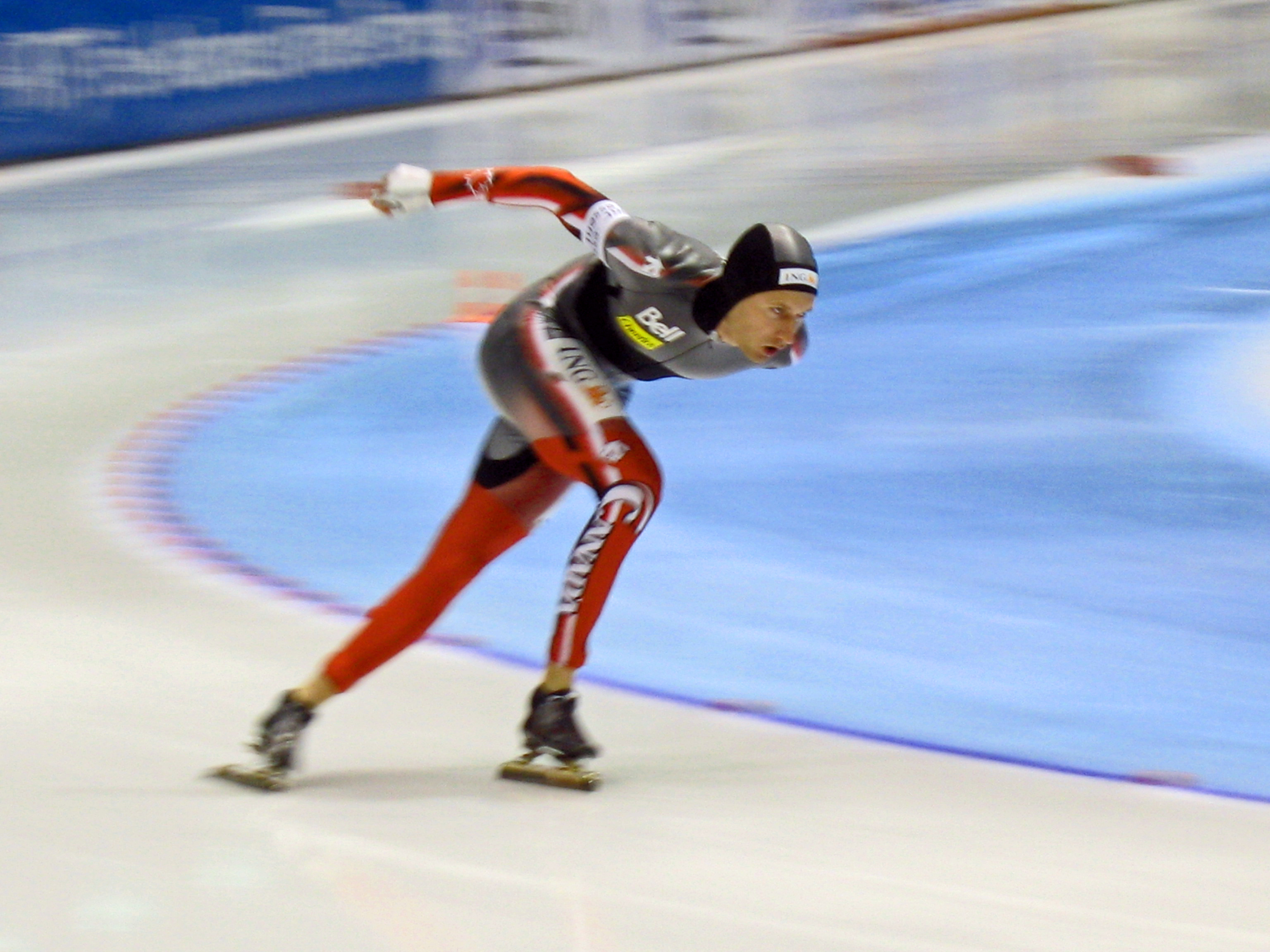
- Steven Elm 5k World Cup Heerenveen nov 2008

Personal information
- Born: August 12, 1975 (age 49); Red Deer, Alberta

Sport
- Sport: Speed skating

Steven Elm (born August 12, 1975 in Red Deer, Alberta) is a Canadian speed skater from Calgary, Alberta.

Elm has been to three Olympics, and in the 2006 Winter Olympics he won a silver medal as part of the Canadian men's pursuit team. He formerly held the world record in the 3000 m from 2000 to 2001. He also broke the world record in the team pursuit, along with Arne Dankers and Denny Morrison in 2007.

== Records ==
=== Personal records ===
Personal records
Men's Speed skating
Event	Result	Date	Location	Notes
500 m	35,81	2006-03-18	Calgary	
1,000 m	1.08,60	2007-11-11	Salt Lake City	
1,500 m	1.44,22	2007-11-09	Salt Lake City	
3,000 m	3.43,48	2005-10-29	Calgary	
5,000 m	6.22,79	2005-11-13	Calgary	
10,000 m	13.36,25	2006-12-31	Calgary	

=== World records ===
Event	Time	Date	Venue
Small combination	152.043	November 29, 1998	Calgary
3000 m	March 19, 1999	Calgary	
3000 m	3.43,76	March 17, 2000	Calgary

Source: SpeedSkatingStats.com
