= Oval Lingotto =

Sports venue in Turin, Italy

- Oval Olympic Arena
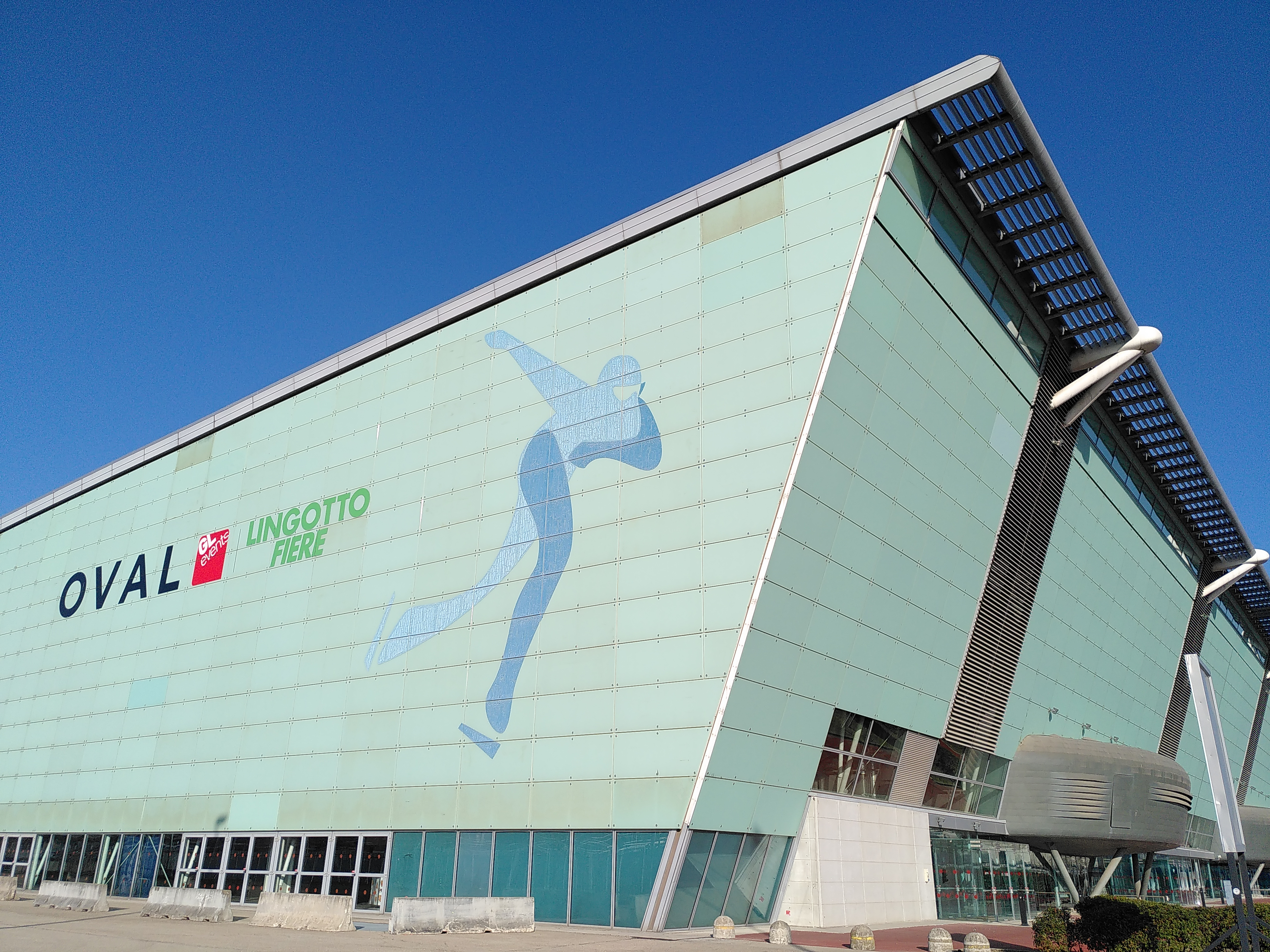
- Interactive map of Oval Lingotto
- Location: Turin, Italy
- Coordinates: 45°1′39″N 7°39′36″E
- Owner: City of Turin
- Capacity: 8,500

Construction
- Groundbreaking: 2003
- Opened: 2005
- Cost: €15 million
- Architects: HOK Sport; Studio Zoppini

The Oval Lingotto, also known as Oval Olympic Arena, is an indoor arena in Turin, Italy. It was built for use at the 2006 Winter Olympics, during which it hosted speed skating events.

== Construction ==
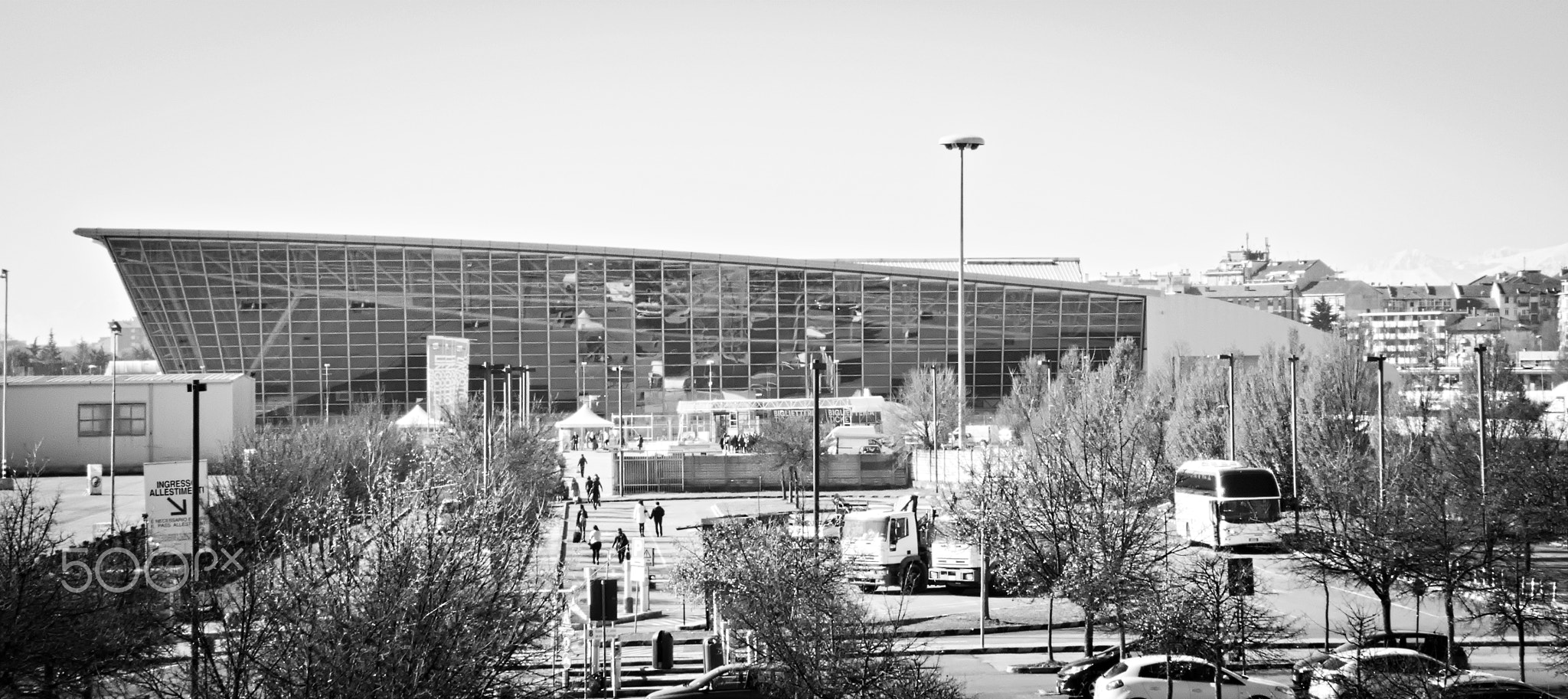
The Oval complex at Torino Lingotto.

It has a capacity of 8,500 spectators and was designed by the global sports architects Populous (formerly known as HOK) with Studio Zoppini Associati of Milan.

After Olympic competition at the venue concluded on 25 February 2006, plans for the structure now include use for fairs and exhibitions in connection with the Lingotto exhibition centre. It will also be able to accommodate 2,000 spectators for ice skating events, however, the venue has remained iceless since 2007.

== Events ==
The 2006 World Fencing Championships took place in the Oval Lingotto from 29 September to 7 October.

The Oval hosted the 2009 European Indoor Championships in Athletics, for which it had a seating capacity for 6,600 spectators.

== See also ==
- List of indoor arenas in Italy
- List of indoor speed skating rinks

Preceded by National Indoor Arena; Birmingham	European Athletics Indoor Championships; Venue; 2009	Succeeded by Palais omnisports de Paris-Bercy; Paris
