= Arne Dankers =

Canadian speed skater (born 1980)

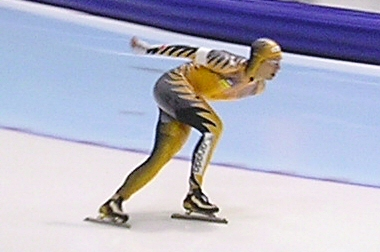
- Dankers in 2007

Medal record

Men's speed skating

Representing Canada

Olympic Games
Silver medal – second place	2006 Turin	Team pursuit

World Single Distance Championships
Silver medal – second place	2007 Salt Lake City	Team pursuit

Arne Dankers (born June 1, 1980) is a Canadian speed skater.

== Background ==
Dankers was born to Peter Dankers and Marja Verhoef, who are both Dutch. The family moved to Canada when he was two years old.

Dankers was a member of the Canadian team that set the team pursuit world record of 3:39.69 in Calgary, Canada on November 12, 2005. The Canadian team, of which Dankers was a part, was not able to duplicate this performance at the 2006 Turin Olympics. The Italian team now holds the Olympic team pursuit record of 3:43.64.

After retiring from speed skating following the 2008-09 season, Dankers graduated from the University of Calgary with a master's degree in Electrical Engineering and later completed a PhD at the Delft University of Technology. He subsequently returned to the University of Calgary in a postdoctoral position, and began publishing research in the fields of dynamic network analysis and systems engineering.

== 2006 Winter Olympics ==
At the 2006 Olympics he participated in the following events:

- Speed Skating, Men's 1500 m
- Speed Skating, Men's 5000 m – 5th place
- Speed Skating, Men's 10000 m – 9th place
- Speed Skating, Men's Team Pursuit – Silver

Dankers placed 5th place in the 5000m men's speed skating final and his team won a silver medal in Men's team pursuit speed skating.
