= 2005 European Speed Skating Championships =

International speed skating competition

European Speed Skating Championships
- Venue: Heerenveen, Netherlands
- Dates: 7–9 January 2005
- Competitors: 32 men 25 women

Medalist men
1st place, gold medalist(s)		Jochem Uytdehaage	NED
2nd place, silver medalist(s)		Sven Kramer	NED
3rd place, bronze medalist(s)		Carl Verheijen	NED

Medalist women
1st place, gold medalist(s)		Anni Friesinger	GER
2nd place, silver medalist(s)		Daniela Anschütz	GER
3rd place, bronze medalist(s)		Claudia Pechstein	GER

The 2005 European Speed Skating Championships were held at Thialf in Heerenveen, Netherlands, from 7 January until 9 January 2005. Jochem Uytdehaage and Anni Friesinger won the titles.

== Men's championships ==
=== Day 1 ===
==== 500 metres ====
Place	Athlete	Country	Time
1st place, gold medalist(s)	Mark Tuitert	Netherlands	36.08
2nd place, silver medalist(s)	Jochem Uytdehaage	Netherlands	36.40
3rd place, bronze medalist(s)	Jan Friesinger	Germany	36.43
4	Yevgeny Lalenkov	Russia	36.59
5	Enrico Fabris	Italy	36.90

==== 5000 metres ====
Place	Athlete	Country	Time
1st place, gold medalist(s)	Eskil Ervik	Norway	6:23.23
2nd place, silver medalist(s)	Carl Verheijen	Netherlands	6:24.26
3rd place, bronze medalist(s)	Sven Kramer	Netherlands	6:24.33
4	Enrico Fabris	Italy	6:24.58
5	Jochem Uytdehaage	Netherlands	6:25.72

=== Day 2 ===
==== 1500 metres ====
Place	Athlete	Country	Time
1st place, gold medalist(s)	Jochem Uytdehaage	Netherlands	1:47.45
2nd place, silver medalist(s)	Mark Tuitert	Netherlands}	1:47.60
3rd place, bronze medalist(s)	Carl Verheijen	Netherlands	1:48.20
4	Sven Kramer	Netherlands	1:48.23
5	Eskil Ervik	Norway	1:48.25

==== 10000 metres ====
Place	Athlete	Country	Time
1st place, gold medalist(s)	Øystein Grødum	Norway	13:06.81
2nd place, silver medalist(s)	Sven Kramer	Netherlands	13:09.65
3rd place, bronze medalist(s)	Carl Verheijen	Netherlands	13:16.30
4	Eskil Ervik	Norway	13:20.02
5	Jochem Uytdehaage	Netherlands	13:24.19

=== Allround results ===
Place	Athlete	Country	500 m	5000 m	1500 m	10000 m	points
1st place, gold medalist(s)	Jochem Uytdehaage	Netherlands	36.40 (2)	6:25.72 (5)	1:47.45 (1)	13:24.19 (5)	150.997
2nd place, silver medalist(s)	Sven Kramer	Netherlands	37.12 (10)	6:24.29 (3)	1:48.23 (4)	13:09.65 (2)	151.107
3rd place, bronze medalist(s)	Carl Verheijen	Netherlands	37.18 (12)	6:24.27 (2)	1:48.20 (3)	13:16.30 (3)	151.488
4	Mark Tuitert	Netherlands	36.08 (1)	6:30.81 (7)	1:49.57 (2)	13:14.51 (10)	151.753
5	Eskil Ervik	Norway	37.41 (16)	6:23.40 (1)	1:48.25 (6)	13:20.02 (4)	151.834
6	Enrico Fabris	Italy	36.71 (5)	6:24.58 (4)	1:48.53 (6)	13:30.67 (6)	151.877
7	Ivan Skobrev	Russia	37.17 (11)	6:34.83 (11)	1:49.19 (8)	13:36.14 (7)	153.856
8	Øystein Grødum	Norway	39.13 (28)	6:26.01 (6)	1:51.00 (15)	13:06.81 (1)	154.071
9	Johan Röjler	Sweden	37.47 (18)	6:29.21 (8)	1:49.73 (9)	13:45.48 (12)	154.241
10	Håvard Bøkko	Norway	37.00 (7)	6:38.14 (14)	1:50.75 (13)	13:46.08 (14)	155.034

NQ = Not qualified for the 10000 m (only the best 12 are qualified)
DNS = Did not start
DQ = Disqualified

Source: ISU

== Women's championships ==
=== Day 1 ===
==== 500 metres ====
Place	Athlete	Country	Time
1st place, gold medalist(s)	Anni Friesinger	Germany	39.36
2nd place, silver medalist(s)	Daniela Anschütz	Germany	39.70
3rd place, bronze medalist(s)	Nicola Mayr	Italy	39.95
4	Annette Bjelkevik	Norway	40.07
5	Claudia Pechstein	Germany	40.29

==== 3000 metres ====
Place	Athlete	Country	Time
1st place, gold medalist(s)	Anni Friesinger	Germany	4:08.72
2nd place, silver medalist(s)	Ireen Wüst	Netherlands	4:08.84
3rd place, bronze medalist(s)	Moniek Kleinsman	Netherlands	4:08.94
4	Renate Groenewold	Netherlands	4:09.35
5	Frederique Ankoné	Netherlands	4:09.53

=== Day 2 ===
==== 1500 metres ====
Place	Athlete	Country	Time
1st place, gold medalist(s)	Anni Friesinger	Germany	1:57.39
2nd place, silver medalist(s)	Daniela Anschütz	Germany	1:58.42
3rd place, bronze medalist(s)	Ireen Wüst	Netherlands	1:58.86
4	Frederique Ankoné	Netherlands	1:59.18
5	Claudia Pechstein	Germany	1:59.66

==== 5000 metres ====
Place	Athlete	Country	Time
1st place, gold medalist(s)	Claudia Pechstein	Germany	7:02.62
2nd place, silver medalist(s)	Renate Groenewold	Netherlands	7:05.38
3rd place, bronze medalist(s)	Anni Friesinger	Germany	7:05.87
4	Frederique Ankoné	Netherlands	7:07.26
5	Daniela Anschütz	Germany	7:07.70

== Rules ==
All participating skaters are allowed to skate the first three distances; 12 skaters may take part on the fourth distance. These 12 skaters are determined by taking the standings on the longest of the first three distances, as well as the samalog standings after three distances, and comparing these lists as follows:

1. Skaters among the top 12 on both lists are qualified.
2. To make up a total of 12, skaters are then added in order of their best rank on either list. Samalog standings take precedence over the longest-distance standings in the event of a tie.

== See also ==
- 2005 World Allround Speed Skating Championships
