= 2006 European Speed Skating Championships =

International speed skating competition

European Speed Skating Championships
- Venue: Hamar, Norway
- Dates: 14–15 January 2006
- Competitors: 33 men 27 women

Medalist men
1st place, gold medalist(s)		Enrico Fabris	ITA
2nd place, silver medalist(s)		Eskil Ervik	NOR
3rd place, bronze medalist(s)		Håvard Bøkko	NOR

Medalist women
1st place, gold medalist(s)		Claudia Pechstein	GER
2nd place, silver medalist(s)		Renate Groenewold	NED
3rd place, bronze medalist(s)		Ireen Wüst	NED

The 2006 European Speed Skating Championships were held at the Vikingskipet in Hamar, Norway, on 14 and 15 January 2006.

== Men's championships ==
=== Day 1 ===
==== 500 metres ====
Place	Athlete	Country	Time
1st place, gold medalist(s)	Konrad Niedźwiedzki	Poland	36.01
2nd place, silver medalist(s)	Ivan Skobrev	Russia	36.74
3rd place, bronze medalist(s)	Enrico Fabris	Italy	36.75
4	Dmitry Shepel	Russia	36.84
5	Håvard Bøkko	Norway	36.90

==== 5000 metres ====
Place	Athlete	Country	Time
1st place, gold medalist(s)	Eskil Ervik	Norway	6:23.23
2nd place, silver medalist(s)	Sven Kramer	Netherlands	6:24.26
3rd place, bronze medalist(s)	Enrico Fabris	Italy	6:24.33
4	Lasse Sætre	Norway	6:25.97
5	Øystein Grødum	Norway	6:28.63

=== Day 2 ===
==== 1500 metres ====
Place	Athlete	Country	Time
1st place, gold medalist(s)	Enrico Fabris	Italy	1:47.57
2nd place, silver medalist(s)	Konrad Niedźwiedzki	Poland}	1:49.16
3rd place, bronze medalist(s)	Håvard Bøkko	Norway	1:49.36
4	Eskil Ervik	Norway	1:49.45
5	Ippolito Sanfratello	Italy	1:49.46

==== 10000 metres ====
Place	Athlete	Country	Time
1st place, gold medalist(s)	Lasse Sætre	Norway	13:14.15
2nd place, silver medalist(s)	Sven Kramer	Netherlands	13:14.51
3rd place, bronze medalist(s)	Øystein Grødum	Norway	13:14.52
4	Eskil Ervik	Norway	13:18.85
5	Håvard Bøkko	Norway	13:24.09

=== Allround results ===
Place	Athlete	Country	500 m	5000 m	1500 m	10000 m	Points
1st place, gold medalist(s)	Enrico Fabris	Italy	36.75 (3)	6:24.33 (3)	1:47.57 (1)	13:29.69 (7)	151.523
2nd place, silver medalist(s)	Eskil Ervik	Norway	37.35 (8)	6:23.33 (2)	1:49.45 (4)	13:18.85 (4)	152.108
3rd place, bronze medalist(s)	Håvard Bøkko	Norway	36.90 (5)	6:28.92 (7)	1:49.36 (3)	13:24.09 (5)	152.449
4	Sven Kramer	Netherlands	37.90 (18)	6:24.26 (2)	1:49.90 (8)	13:14.51 (2)	152.684
5	Ivan Skobrev	Russia	36.74 (2)	6:30.81 (10)	1:49.57 (6)	13:38.56 (11)	153.272
6	Johan Röjler	Sweden	37.40 (9)	6:28.79 (6)	1:50.62 (13)	13:29.44 (6)	153.624
7	Ippolito Sanfratello	Italy	37.52 (12)	6:30.35 (8)	1:49.46 (5)	13:32.95 (9)	153.688
8	Lasse Sætre	Norway	38.60 (26)	6:25.97 (4)	1:50.68 (14)	13:14.15 (1)	153.797
9	Carl Verheijen	Netherlands	38.21 (20)	6:30.55 (9)	1:50.36 (11)	13:30.87 (8)	154.594
10	Paweł Zygmunt	Poland	37.96 (16)	6:32.80 (11)	1:50.72 (15)	13:37.41 (10)	154.083

NQ = Not qualified for the 10000 m (only the best 12 are qualified)
DNS = Did not start
DQ = Disqualified

Source: ISU

== Women's championships ==
=== Day 1 ===
==== 500 metres ====
Place	Athlete	Country	Time
1st place, gold medalist(s)	Yekaterina Lobysheva	Russia	39.27
2nd place, silver medalist(s)	Yekaterina Abramova	Russia	39.44
3rd place, bronze medalist(s)	Claudia Pechstein	Germany	39.60
4	Katarzyna Wójcicka	Poland	40.04
5	Ireen Wüst	Netherlands	40.15

==== 3000 metres ====
Place	Athlete	Country	Time
1st place, gold medalist(s)	Renate Groenewold	Netherlands	4:05.797
2nd place, silver medalist(s)	Claudia Pechstein	Germany	4:08.40
3rd place, bronze medalist(s)	Martina Sáblíková	Czech Republic	4:08.60
4	Ireen Wüst	Netherlands	4:08.92
5	Maren Haugli	Norway	4:10.43

=== Day 2 ===
==== 1500 metres ====
Place	Athlete	Country	Time
1st place, gold medalist(s)	Ireen Wüst	Netherlands	1:57.16
2nd place, silver medalist(s)	Renate Groenewold	Netherlands	1:57.77
3rd place, bronze medalist(s)	Claudia Pechstein	Germany	1:58.04
4	Yekaterina Lobysheva	Russia	2:00.71
5	Yekaterina Abramova	Russia	2:00.93

==== 5000 metres ====
Place	Athlete	Country	Time
1st place, gold medalist(s)	Martina Sáblíková	Czech Republic	7:05.10
2nd place, silver medalist(s)	Claudia Pechstein	Germany	7:08.02
3rd place, bronze medalist(s)	Renate Groenewold	Netherlands	7:08.76
4	Ireen Wüst	Netherlands	7:11.60
5	Maren Haugli	Norway	7:13.84

=== Allround results ===
Place	Athlete	Country	500 m	3000 m	1500 m	5000 m	Points
1st place, gold medalist(s)	Claudia Pechstein	Germany	39.60 (3)	4:08.47 (2)	1:58.04 (3)	7:08.02 (2)	163.159
2nd place, silver medalist(s)	Renate Groenewold	Netherlands	40.50 (8)	4:05.79 (1)	1:57.77 (2)	7:08.76 (3)	163.597
3rd place, bronze medalist(s)	Ireen Wüst	Netherlands	40.15 (5)	4:08.92 (4)	1:57.16 (1)	7:11.60 (4)	163.849
4	Martina Sáblíková	Czech Republic	41.22 (16)	4:08.60 (3)	2:01.83 (11)	7:05.10 (1)	165.773
5	Maren Haugli	Norway	40.73 (13)	4:10.43 (5)	2:00.98 (6)	7:13.84 (5)	166.178
6	Yekaterina Lobysheva	Russia	39.27 (1)	4:17.03 (13)	2:00.71 (4)	7:31.20 (14)	167.464
7	Lucille Opitz	Germany	40.67 (11)	4:14.75 (8)	2:01.29 (7)	7:20.01 (7)	167.559
8	Svetlana Vysokova	Russia	40.68 (12)	4:13.96 (7)	2:03.05 (15)	7:15.46 (6)	167.568
9	Daniela Anschütz	Germany	40.36 (6)	4:15.13 (10)	2:01.62 (9)	7:21.74 (8)	167.595
10	Katarzyna Wójcicka	Poland	40.04 (4)	4:15.10 (9)	2:03.12 (16)	7:22.31 (9)	167.827

NQ = Not qualified for the 5000 m (only the best 12 are qualified)
DQ = Disqualified
DNS = Did not start

Source: ISU

== Rules ==
All participating skaters are allowed to skate the first three distances; 12 skaters may take part on the fourth distance. These 12 skaters are determined by taking the standings on the longest of the first three distances, as well as the samalog standings after three distances, and comparing these lists as follows:

1. Skaters among the top 12 on both lists are qualified.
2. To make up a total of 12, skaters are then added in order of their best rank on either list. Samalog standings take precedence over the longest-distance standings in the event of a tie.

== See also ==
- 2006 World Allround Speed Skating Championships
