= 2006 World Allround Speed Skating Championships =

2006 edition of the World Allround Speed Skating Championships

World Allround Speed Skating Championships
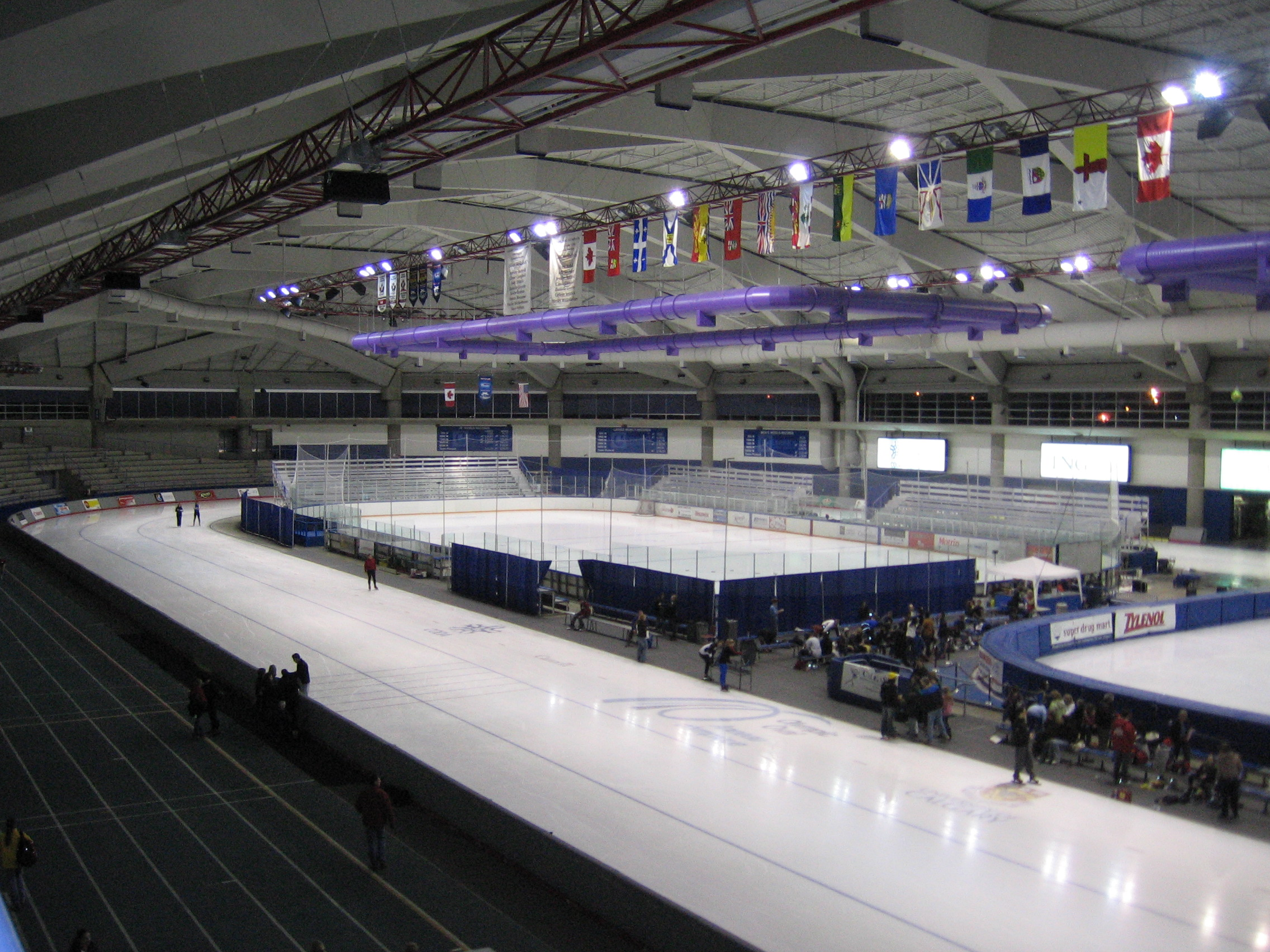
- Olympic Oval
- Location: Calgary, Alberta, Canada
- Venue: Olympic Oval
- Dates: 18 and 19 March
- Competitors: 48

Medalist men
1st place, gold medalist(s)		Shani Davis	USA
2nd place, silver medalist(s)		Enrico Fabris	ITA
3rd place, bronze medalist(s)		Sven Kramer	NED

Medalist women
1st place, gold medalist(s)		Cindy Klassen	CAN
2nd place, silver medalist(s)		Claudia Pechstein	GER
3rd place, bronze medalist(s)		Kristina Groves	CAN

The 2006 World Allround Speed Skating Championships were held in the indoor Olympic Oval in Calgary (Canada) on 18 and 19 March 2006.

The Canadian Cindy Klassen and the American Shani Davis became world champions.

== Women championships ==
=== Day 1 ===
==== 500 meter ====
Place	Athlete	Country	Time
1st place, gold medalist(s)	Cindy Klassen	Canada	37.51
2nd place, silver medalist(s)	Kristina Groves	Canada	38.75
2nd place, silver medalist(s)	Yekaterina Lobysheva	Russia	38.75
4	Claudia Pechstein	Germany	38.99
5	Ireen Wüst	Netherlands	39.04
9	Wieteke Cramer	Netherlands	39.37
12	Tessa van Dijk	Netherlands	39.73

==== 3000 meter ====
Place	Athlete	Country	Time
1st place, gold medalist(s)	Cindy Klassen	Canada	3:53.34
2nd place, silver medalist(s)	Claudia Pechstein	Germany	3:57.35
3rd place, bronze medalist(s)	Kristina Groves	Canada	3:59.46
4	Daniela Anschütz-Thoms	Germany	4:00.44
5	Martina Sáblíková	Czech Republic	4:01.09
7	Ireen Wüst	Netherlands	4:01.11
8	Tessa van Dijk	Netherlands	4:02.19
12	Wieteke Cramer	Netherlands	4:04.79

=== Day 2 ===
==== 1500 meter ====
Place	Athlete	Country	Time
1st place, gold medalist(s)	Cindy Klassen	Canada	1:51.85
2nd place, silver medalist(s)	Ireen Wüst	Netherlands	1:54.03
3rd place, bronze medalist(s)	Kristina Groves	Canada	1:54.54
4	Claudia Pechstein	Germany	1:55.82
5	Maki Tabata	Japan	1:55.95
7	Tessa van Dijk	Netherlands	1:56.47
14	Wieteke Cramer	Netherlands	1:57.41

==== 5000 meter ====
Place	Athlete	Country	Time
1st place, gold medalist(s)	Cindy Klassen	Canada	6:48.97
2nd place, silver medalist(s)	Martina Sáblíková	Czech Republic	6:50.45
3rd place, bronze medalist(s)	Claudia Pechstein	Germany	6:51.11
4	Kristina Groves	Canada	6:54.55
5	Maren Haugli	Norway	6:54.98
7	Ireen Wüst	Netherlands	6:59.87
9	Tessa van Dijk	Netherlands	7:00.10
11	Wieteke Cramer	Netherlands	7:08.08

=== Allround results ===
Place	Athlete	Country	500 m	3000 m	1500 m	5000 m	Points
1st place, gold medalist(s)	Cindy Klassen	Canada	37.51 (1)	3:53.34 (1) WR	1.51.85 (1)	6:48.97 (1)	154.580 WR
2nd place, silver medalist(s)	Claudia Pechstein	Germany	38.99 (4)	3:57.35 (2)	1:55.82 (4)	6:51.11 (3)	158.265
3rd place, bronze medalist(s)	Kristina Groves	Canada	38.75 (2)	3:59.46 (3)	1:54.54 (3)	6:54.55 (4)	158.295
4	Ireen Wüst	Netherlands	39.04 (5)	4:01.11 (7)	1:54.03 (2)	6:59.87 (7)	159.222
5	Maren Haugli	Norway	39.94 (14)	4:00.34 (4)	1:55.99 (6)	6:54.98 (5)	160.157
6	Daniela Anschütz-Thoms	Germany	39.81 (13)	4:00.44 (5)	1:56.63 (9)	6:56.15 (6)	160.374
7	Maki Tabata	Japan	39.39 (10)	4:02.59 (10)	1:55.95 (5)	7:00.09 (8)	160.480
8	Tessa van Dijk	Netherlands	39.73 (12)	4:02.19 (8)	1:56.47 (7)	7:00.10 (9)	160.928
9	Martina Sáblíková	Czech Republic	40.72 (21)	4:01.09 (6)	1:57.92 (16)	6:50.45 (2)	161.252
10	Wang Fei	China	39.45 (11)	4:04.38 (11)	1:56.56 (8)	7:10.48 (12)	162.081
11	Wieteke Cramer	Netherlands	39.37 (9)	4:04.79 (12)	1:57.41 (14)	7:08.08 (11)	162.112
12	Catherine Raney	United States	40.69 (20)	4:02.58 (9)	1:57.63 (15)	7:02.69 (10)	162.599
NQ13	Yekaterina Lobysheva	Russia	38.75 (2)	4:09.98 (15)	1:56.75 (10)		
NQ14	Katarzyna Wójcicka	Poland	39.08 (6)	4:10.37 (16)	1:56.84 (12)		
NQ15	Yekaterina Abramova	Russia	39.08 (6)	4:10.93 (17)	1:57.21 (13)		
NQ16	Christine Nesbitt	Canada	39.29 (8)	4:12.91 (22)	1:56.75 (10)		
NQ17	Lucille Opitz	Germany	40.65 (17)	4:07.34 (13)	1:58.57 (17)		
NQ18	Annette Bjelkevik	Norway	40.46 (16)	4:08.84 (14)	1:58.57 (17)		
NQ19	Maria Lamb	United States	40.21 (15)	4:12.66 (21)	1:58.94 (19)		
NQ20	Eriko Ishino	Japan	40.90 (22)	4:11.13 (19)	2:00.82 (20)		
NQ21	Eriko Seo	Japan	40.65 (17)	4:12.12 (20)	2:02.05 (22)		
NQ22	Anna Rokita	Austria	40.94 (23)	4:11.03 (18)	2:01.80 (21)		
NQ23	Adelia Marra	Italy	40.65 (17)	4:18.10 (24)	2:03.88 (23)		
NQ24	Lada Zadonskaya	Russia	41.93 (24)	4:16.85 (23)	2:05.83 (24)		

NQ = Not qualified for the 5000 m (only the best 12 are qualified)
DQ = disqualified

== Men championships ==
=== Day 1 ===
==== 500 meter ====
Place	Athlete	Country	Time
1st place, gold medalist(s)	Shani Davis	United States	35.17
2nd place, silver medalist(s)	Konrad Niedźwiedzki	Poland	35.52
3rd place, bronze medalist(s)	Chad Hedrick	United States	35.58
4	Denny Morrison	Canada	35.59
5	Steven Elm	Canada	35.81
12	Wouter olde Heuvel	Netherlands	36.75
14	Sven Kramer	Netherlands	36.93
16	Sicco Janmaat	Netherlands	36.97
22	Bob de Jong	Netherlands	38.12

==== 5000 meter ====
Place	Athlete	Country	Time
1st place, gold medalist(s)	Sven Kramer	Netherlands	6:09.97
2nd place, silver medalist(s)	Chad Hedrick	United States	6:09.98
3rd place, bronze medalist(s)	Enrico Fabris	Italy	6:10.23
4	Shani Davis	United States	6:10.49
5	Eskil Ervik	Norway	6:12.09
10	Sicco Janmaat	Netherlands	6:22.38
13	Wouter olde Heuvel	Netherlands	6:25.80
15	Bob de Jong	Netherlands	6:28.52

=== Day 2 ===
==== 1500 meter ====
Place	Athlete	Country	Time
1st place, gold medalist(s)	Shani Davis	United States	1:42.68
2nd place, silver medalist(s)	Chad Hedrick	United States	1:42.85
3rd place, bronze medalist(s)	Denny Morrison	Canada	1:42.97
4	Enrico Fabris	Italy	1:44.02
5	Konrad Niedźwiedzki	Poland	1:45.08
12	Sicco Janmaat	Netherlands	1:46.72
13	Sven Kramer	Netherlands	1:46.80
15	Wouter olde Heuvel	Netherlands	1:47.01
23	Bob de Jong	Netherlands	1:49.89

==== 10000 meter ====
Place	Athlete	Country	Time
1st place, gold medalist(s)	Sven Kramer	Netherlands	12:51.60
2nd place, silver medalist(s)	Øystein Grødum	Norway	12:56.38
3rd place, bronze medalist(s)	Lasse Sætre	Norway	12:56.85
4	Eskil Ervik	Norway	13:01.41
5	Shani Davis	United States	13:05.94
9	Sicco Janmaat	Netherlands	13:29.55

=== Allround results ===
Place	Athlete	Country	500 m	5000 m	1500 m	10000 m	Points
1st place, gold medalist(s)	Shani Davis	United States	35.17 (1)	6:10.49 (4)	1.42.68 (1) WR	13:05.94 (5)	145.742 WR
2nd place, silver medalist(s)	Enrico Fabris	Italy	35.99 (6)	6:10.23 (3)	1:44.02 (4)	13:10.60 (6)	147.216
3rd place, bronze medalist(s)	Sven Kramer	Netherlands	36.93 (14)	6:09.97 (1)	1:46.80 (13)	12:51.60 (1) WR	148.107
4	Eskil Ervik	Norway	37.03 (17)	6:12.09 (5)	1:45.73 (9)	13:01.41 (4)	148.552
5	Denny Morrison	Canada	35.59 (4)	6:29.93 (18)	1:42.97 (3)	13:45.14 (10)	150.163
6	Håvard Bøkko	Norway	36.42 (9)	6:20.42 (9)	1:46.31 (11)	13:29.42 (8)	150.369
7	Ippolito Sanfratello	Italy	36.59 (10)	6:23.66 (11)	1:46.13 (10)	13:26.91 (7)	150.677
8	Konrad Niedźwiedzki	Poland	35.52 (2)	6:29.14 (16)	1:45.08 (5)	13:51.95 (11)	151.057
9	Sicco Janmaat	Netherlands	36.97 (16)	6:22.38 (10)	1:46.72 (12)	13:29.55 (9)	151.258
10	Øystein Grødum	Norway	39.10 (24)	6:16.16 (6)	1:48.52 (20)	12:56.38 (2)	151.708
11	Lasse Sætre	Norway	38.45 (23)	6:19.35 (7)	2.15.00 (24)	12:56.85 (3)	160.227
12	Chad Hedrick	United States	35.58 (3)	6:09.98 (2)	1:42.85 (2)	DQ	
NQ13	Steven Elm	Canada	35.81 (5)	6:31.80 (19)	1:45.16 (6)		
NQ14	Stefano Donagrandi	Italy	36.67 (11)	6:29.68 (17)	1:45.52 (8)		
NQ15	Wouter olde Heuvel	Netherlands	36.75 (12)	6:25.80 (13)	1:47.01 (15)		
NQ16	Tobias Schneider	Germany	36.94 (15)	6:25.65 (12)	1:47.44 (17)		
NQ17	Arne Dankers	Canada	37.86 (21)	6:20.12 (8)	1:47.35 (16)		
NQ18	Dmitry Babenko	Kazakhstan	36.83 (13)	6:32.25 (20)	1:48.40 (19)		
NQ19	Pawel Zygmunt	Poland	37.74 (20)	6:26.88 (14)	1:49.60 (22)		
NQ20	Takahiro Ushiyama	Japan	36.06 (8)	6:49.66 (22)	1:48.24 (18)		
NQ21	Naoki Yasuda	Japan	37.11 (18)	6:38.55 (21)	1:49.30 (21)		
NQ22	Bob de Jong	Netherlands	38.12 (22)	6:28.52 (15)	1:49.89 (23)		
DQ	Ivan Skobrev	Russia	36.00 (7)	DNF (-)	1:45.36 (7)		
DQ	Justin Warsylewicz	Canada	37.16 (19)	DNF (-)	1:46.84 (14)		

NQ = Not qualified for the 10000 m (only the best 12 are qualified)
DQ = disqualified

== Rules ==
All 24 participating skaters are allowed to skate the first three distances; 12 skaters may take part on the fourth distance. These 12 skaters are determined by taking the standings on the longest of the first three distances, as well as the samalog standings after three distances, and comparing these lists as follows:

1. Skaters among the top 12 on both lists are qualified.
2. To make up a total of 12, skaters are then added in order of their best rank on either list. Samalog standings take precedence over the longest-distance standings in the event of a tie.
