= 2016 KNSB Dutch Single Distance Championships – Men's mass start =

Dutch speed skating competition

- Venue: Thialf, Heerenveen
- Date: 29 December 2015
- Competitors: 29 skaters

Medalist men
1st place, gold medalist(s)		Willem Hoolwerf	NED
2nd place, silver medalist(s)		Thom van Beek	NED
3rd place, bronze medalist(s)		Douwe de Vries	NED

The men's mass start at the 2016 KNSB Dutch Single Distance Championships in Heerenveen took place at Thialf ice rink on Tuesday 29 December 2015. There were 29 participants. This mass start event was the first time that it was officially part of the Dutch national speed skating championships.

== Result ==
Rank	Skater	Laps	Points				
Rank	Skater	Laps	Sprint 1	Sprint 2	Sprint 3	Final sprint	Total
1st place, gold medalist(s)	Willem Hoolwerf	16	3		5	60	68
2nd place, silver medalist(s)	Thom van Beek	16				40	40
3rd place, bronze medalist(s)	Douwe de Vries	16	5	1		20	26
4	Mart Bruggink	16	1	3	3		7
5	Thomas Geerdinck	16		5	1		6
6	Marcel van Ham	16	1				1
7	Evert Hoolwerf	16					0
8	Gary Hekman	16					0
9	Arjan Stroetinga	16					0
10	Simon Schouten	16					0
11	Sjinkie Knegt	16					0
12	Jan Blokhuijsen	16					0
13	Luc ter Haar	16					0
14	Bart de Vries	16					0
15	Marcel Bosker	16					0
16	Peter van de Pol	16					0
17	Bart Mol	16					0
18	Johan Knol	16					0
19	Ronald Kruijer	16					0
20	Kay Schipper	16					0
21	Bob de Jong	16					0
22	Peter Groen	16					0
23	Johan Hendriks	16					0
24	Rick Schipper	16					0
25	Arjen van der Kieft	16					0
26	Mark Prinsen	16					0
27	Wesly Dijs	16					0
28	Ruurd Dijkstra	16					0
29	Patrick Roest	16					0
NC	Jorrit Bergsma	DNS					
NC	Sven Kramer	DNS					

Referee: Hanjo Heideman. Starter: Jan Zwier. Start: 18:27 hr. Finish: 18:43 hr.
