= 2005 World Allround Speed Skating Championships =

International speed skating competition

World Allround Speed Skating Championships
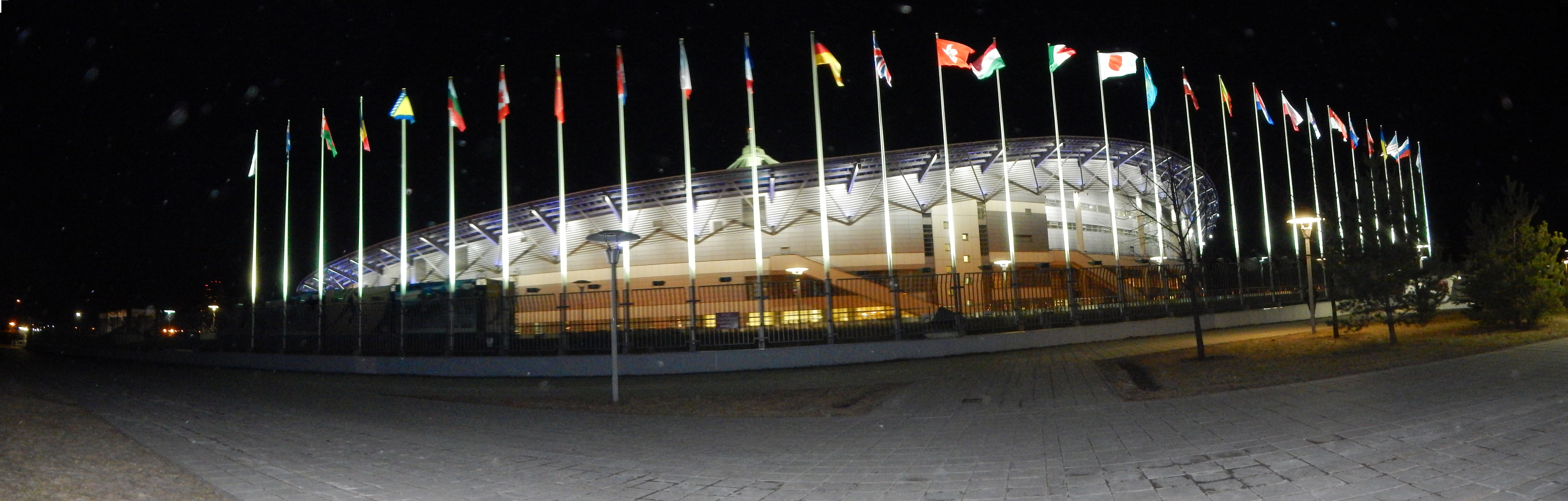
- Ice Palace Krylatskoye
- Location: Moscow, Russia
- Venue: Ice Palace Krylatskoye
- Dates: 5 and 6 February
- Competitors: 48

Medalist men
1st place, gold medalist(s)		Shani Davis	USA
2nd place, silver medalist(s)		Chad Hedrick	USA
3rd place, bronze medalist(s)		Sven Kramer	NED

Medalist women
1st place, gold medalist(s)		Anni Friesinger	GER
2nd place, silver medalist(s)		Cindy Klassen	CAN
3rd place, bronze medalist(s)		Claudia Pechstein	GER

The 2005 World Allround Speed Skating Championships were held in the indoor arena in Moscow, Russia, on 5 and 6 February 2005.

German Anni Friesinger and American Shani Davis became the world champions.

== Men's championships ==
=== Allround results ===
Place	Athlete	Country	Points	500 m	5000 m	1500 m	10000 m
1st place, gold medalist(s)	Shani Davis	United States	150.777	36,33 (2)	6.26,39 (5)	1.46,60 (1)	13.25,51 (5)
2nd place, silver medalist(s)	Chad Hedrick	United States	150.961	36,65 (3)	6.23,61 (2)	1.47,50 (2)	13.22,35 (4)
3rd place, bronze medalist(s)	Sven Kramer	Netherlands	152.244	37,19 (7)	6.27,27 (6)	1.49,28 (6)	13.18,03 (3)
4	Carl Verheijen	Netherlands	152.715	37,64 (13)	6.25,99 (4)	1.49,81 (9)	13.17,47 (2)
5	Jochem Uytdehaage	Netherlands	152.793	37,34 (11)	6.27,87 (7)	1.49,07 (5)	13.26,21 (6)
6	K. C. Boutiette	United States	153.532	36,98 (6)	6.33,74 (9)	1.48,79 (3)	13.38,31 (9)
7	Bob de Jong	Netherlands	153.859	38,30 (16)	6.24,12 (3)	1.50,22 (10)	13.28,15 (7)
8	Øystein Grødum	Norway	154.123	39,55 (22)	6.22,31 (1)	1.51,01 (14)	13.06,79 (1)
9	Ivan Skobrev	Russia	154.398	37,28 (10)	6.35,22 (11)	1.49,40 (8)	13.42,60 (10)
10	Derek Parra	United States	155.390	36,82 (4)	6.42,26 (17)	1.48,98 (4)	14.00,37 (11)
11	Bart Veldkamp	Belgium	155.410	38,31 (17)	6.32,83 (8)	1.51,85 (17)	13.30,68 (8)
12	Jevgeni Lalenkov	Russia	156.393	36,96 (5)	6.42,82 (18)	1.49,32 (7)	14.14,22 (12)
NQ13	Takahiro Ushiyama	Japan	113.960	36,28 (1)	6.46,84 (20)	1.50,99 (13)	
NQ14	Stefan Heythausen	Germany	114.271	37,23 (8)	6.40,98 (15)	1.50,83 (12)	
NQ15	Håvard Bøkko	Norway	114.380	37,27 (9)	6.39,84 (14)	1.51,38 (16)	
NQ16	Johan Röjler	Sweden	114.557	37,71 (14)	6.37,31 (12)	1.51,35 (15)	
NQ17	Arne Dankers	Canada	115.096	38,77 (21)	6.35,03 (10)	1.50,47 (11)	
NQ18	Hiroki Hirako	Japan	115.568	37,94 (15)	6.38,32 (13)	1.53,39 (19)	
NQ19	Kesato Miyazaki	Japan	116.529	38,31 (17)	6.46,23 (19)	1.52,79 (18)	
NQ20	Philippe Marois	Canada	119.270	38,53 (19)	7.03,34 (21)	1.55,22 (20)	
NQ21	Paweł Zygmunt	Poland	78.718	38,60 (20)	6.41,18 (16)	NS	
NQ22	Steven Elm	Canada	79.854	37,51 (12)	7.03,44 (22)	NS	
NQ23	Eskil Ervik	Norway	80.420	1.20,42 *(23)	NS		
NQ24	Enrico Fabris	Italy	0.000	(NS)			

NQ = Not qualified for the 10000 m (only the best 12 are qualified)
DQ = disqualified
NS = Not started

== Women's championships ==
=== Allround results ===
Place	Athlete	Country	Points	500 m	3000 m	1500 m	5000 m
1st place, gold medalist(s)	Anni Friesinger	Germany	161.557	39,04 (1)	4.05,64 (1)	1.57,35 (1)	7.04,61 (1)
2nd place, silver medalist(s)	Cindy Klassen	Canada	163.214	39,10 (2)	4.08,19 (5)	1.58,23 (3)	7.13,39 (8)
3rd place, bronze medalist(s)	Claudia Pechstein	Germany	163.418	40,33 (8)	4.06,30 (2)	1.58,59 (5)	7.05,08 (2)
4	Daniela Anschütz	Germany	163.719	40,07 (4)	4.07,97 (3)	1.58,31 (4)	7.08,85 (4)
5	Ireen Wüst	Netherlands	164.047	40,10 (5)	4.08,15 (4)	1.58,17 (2)	7.11,99 (6)
6	Kristina Groves	Canada	165.068	40,74 (15)	4.08,75 (7)	1.59,04 (6)	7.11,90 (5)
7	Renate Groenewold	Netherlands	165.453	41,01 (18)	4.08,37 (6)	1.59,42 (7)	7.12,42 (7)
8	Moniek Kleinsman	Netherlands	166.399	40,91 (17)	4.11,13 (8)	2.00,40 (10)	7.15,01 (9)
9	Nami Nemoto	Japan	166.713	40,66 (14)	4.13,16 (13)	2.00,66 (11)	7.16,40 (10)
10	Maki Tabata	Japan	166.808	40,36 (9)	4.12,00 (9)	2.00,35 (9)	7.23,32 (12)
11	Wieteke Cramer	Netherlands	167.051	40,05 (3)	4.12,88 (11)	2.02,05 (18)	7.21,72 (11)
12	Clara Hughes	Canada	167.143	42,08 (22)	4.12,11 (10)	2.01,43 (13)	7.05,69 (3)
NQ13	Katrin Kalex	Germany	123.263	40,46 (10)	4.14,24 (14)	2.01,29 (12)	
NQ14	Katarzyna Wójcicka	Poland	123.304	40,53 (11)	4.13,15 (12)	2.01,75 (15)	
NQ15	Olga Tarasova	Russia	123.326	40,74 (15)	4.16,14 (17)	1.59,69 (8)	
NQ16	Annette Bjelkevik	Norway	123.706	40,25 (7)	4.16,74 (20)	2.02,00 (17)	
NQ17	Eriko Ishino	Japan	123.817	40,59 (12)	4.16,51 (18)	2.01,43 (13)	
NQ18	Nicola Mayr	Italy	124.475	40,60 (13)	4.19,29 (22)	2.01,98 (16)	
NQ19	Svetlana Vysokova	Russia	124.491	41,14 (20)	4.15,31 (15)	2.02,40 (20)	
NQ20	Gao Yang	China	124.609	40,11 (6)	4.21,16 (23)	2.02,92 (22)	
NQ21	Ji Jia	China	125.039	41,07 (19)	4.19,28 (21)	2.02,27 (19)	
NQ22	Maren Haugli	Norway	126.046	41,67 (21)	4.16,60 (19)	2.04,83 (24)	
NQ23	Kristine Holzer	United States	128.516	42,73 (23)	4.25,64 (24)	2.04,54 (23)	
DQ1	Maria Lamb	United States	83.548	1.03,70 *(DQ)	4.15,65 (16)	2.02,82 (21)	

NQ = Not qualified for the 5000 m (only the best 12 are qualified)
DQ = disqualified

== Rules ==
All 24 participating skaters are allowed to skate the first three distances; 12 skaters may take part on the fourth distance. These 12 skaters are determined by taking the standings on the longest of the first three distances, as well as the samalog standings after three distances, and comparing these lists as follows:

1. Skaters among the top 12 on both lists are qualified.
2. To make up a total of 12, skaters are then added in order of their best rank on either list. Samalog standings take precedence over the longest-distance standings in the event of a tie.
