= 2016 KNSB Dutch Single Distance Championships =

KNSB Dutch Single Distance Championships
- Venue: Thialf, Heerenveen
- Dates: 27-29 December 2015

The 2016 KNSB Dutch Single Distance Championships were held at the Thialf ice skating rink in Heerenveen from Sunday 27 December 2015 to Tuesday 29 December 2015. Although the tournament was held in 2015 it was the 2016 edition as it was part of the 2015–2016 speed skating season.

== Schedule ==
Schedule
Date	Starting time	Event
Sunday; 27 December 2015	13:55	Men's 5000 meter Men's 500 meter (1); Women's 1500 meter Men's 500 meter (2)
Monday; 28 December 2015	14:20	Women's 3000 meter Women's 500 meter (1); Men's 1500 meter Women's 500 meter (2)
Tuesday; 29 December 2015	13:15	Women's 5000 meter Men's 10.000 meter Women's 1000 meter Men's 1000 meter Women's Mass start Men's Mass start

== Medalists ==
=== Men ===
Distance	Gold		Silver		Bronze	
2*500m details	Kai Verbij	69.901 34.918–34.98	Jan Smeekens	70.028 34.98–35.04	Ronald Mulder	70.077 35.11–34.95
1000m details	Kjeld Nuis	1:08.24	Kai Verbij	1:08.57	Stefan Groothuis	1:09.05
1500m details	Kjeld Nuis	1:45.53	Thomas Krol	1:46.20	Stefan Groothuis	1:46.88
5000m details	Sven Kramer	6:11.34	Jorrit Bergsma	6:13.19	Douwe de Vries	6:19.90
10000m details	Sven Kramer	12:58.71	Erik Jan Kooiman	13:05.22	Bob de Vries	13:06.40
Mass start details	Willem Hoolwerf	60 points	Thom van Beek	40 points	Douwe de Vries	26 points

=== Women ===
Distance	Gold		Silver		Bronze	
2*500m details	Margot Boer	77.275 38.60–38.66	Janine Smit	77.611 39.08–38.52	Marrit Leenstra	77.711 38.86–38.85
1000m details	Jorien ter Mors	1:15.17	Marrit Leenstra	1:16.27	Ireen Wüst	1:16.29
1500m details	Jorien ter Mors	1:55.56	Marrit Leenstra	1:156.82	Ireen Wüst	1:57.68
3000m details	Ireen Wüst	4:04.13	Antoinette de Jong	4:04.07	Jorien Voorhuis	4:07.63
5000m details	Carien Kleibeuker	6:58.88	Irene Schouten	7:03.71	Lisa van Geest	7:06.30
Mass start details	Irene Schouten	60 points	Janneke Ensing	40 points	Annouk van der Weijden	25 points
