= 2015 World Single Distance Speed Skating Championships – Men's team pursuit =

Men's team pursuit at the 2015 World Single Distance Speed Skating Championships
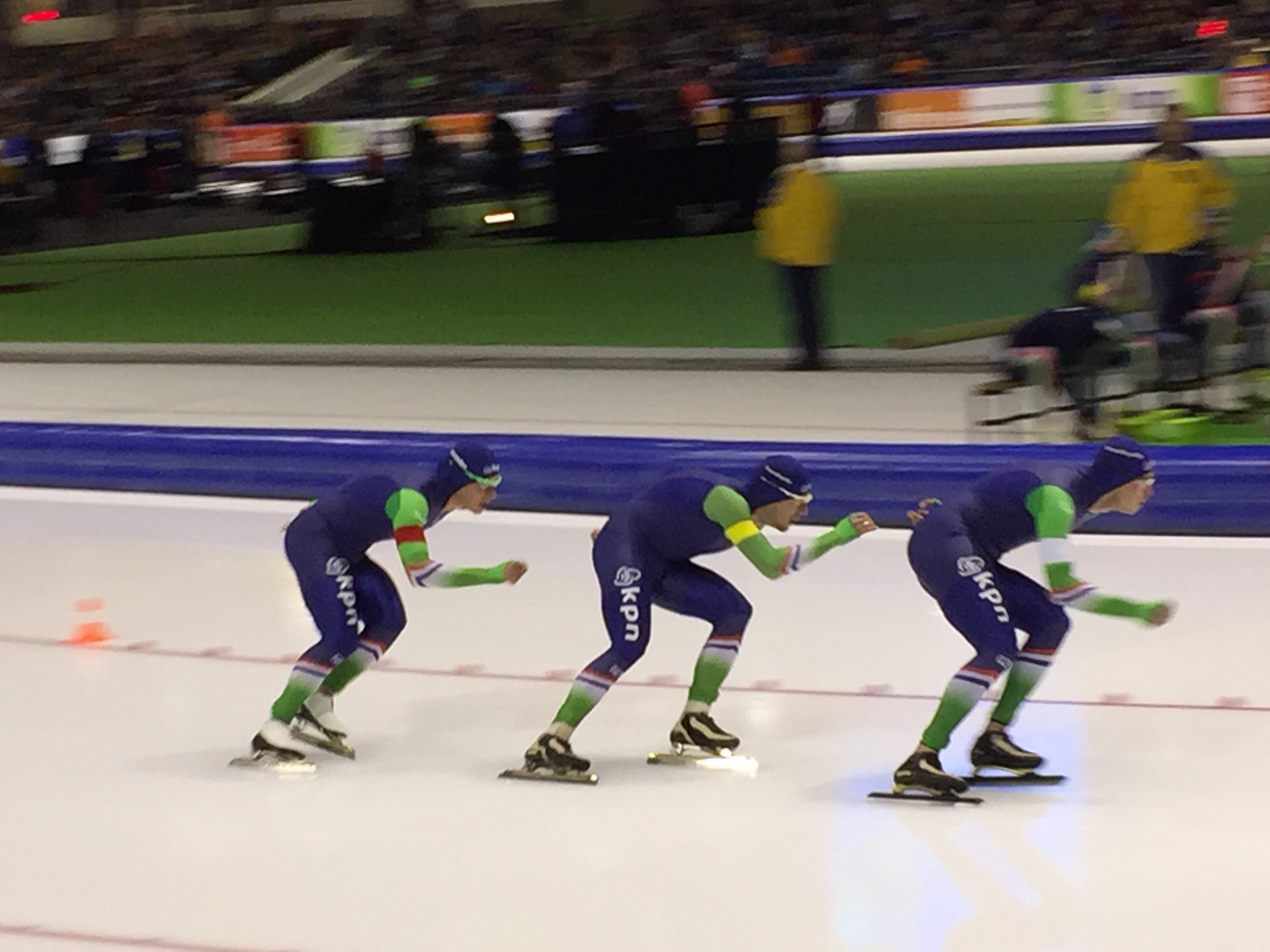
- The Dutch winning team
- Venue: Thialf, Heerenveen
- Date: 13 February 2015
- Competitors: 32 from 8 nations
- Winning time: 3:41.40

Medalists
gold medal	Sven Kramer; Koen Verweij; Douwe de Vries	Netherlands
silver medal	Ted-Jan Bloemen; Denny Morrison; Jordan Belchos	Canada
bronze medal	Lee Seung-hoon; Kim Cheol-min; Ko Byung-wook	South Korea

The Men's team pursuit race of the 2015 World Single Distance Speed Skating Championships was held on 13 February 2015.

== Results ==
The race was started at 21:35.

Rank	Pair	Lane	Country	Time	Diff
1st place, gold medalist(s)	3	o	NED	3:41.40	
2nd place, silver medalist(s)	2	o	CAN	3:44.09	+2.69
3rd place, bronze medalist(s)	3	i	KOR	3:44.96	+3.56
4	2	i	RUS	3:46.78	+5.38
5	4	i	ITA	3:47.07	+5.67
6	4	o	POL	3:48.94	+7.54
7	1	i	NOR	3:50.58	+9.18
8	1	o	GER	3:50.76	+9.36
