= 2016 World Single Distances Speed Skating Championships – Men's 5000 metres =

Men's 5000 metres at the 2016 World Single Distances Speed Skating Championships
- Venue: Kolomna Speed Skating Center, Kolomna
- Date: 13 February
- Competitors: 20 from 14 nations
- Winning time: 6:10.31

Medalists
gold medal	Sven Kramer	Netherlands
silver medal	Jorrit Bergsma	Netherlands
bronze medal	Sverre Lunde Pedersen	Norway

The Men's 5000 metres race of the 2016 World Single Distances Speed Skating Championships was held on 13 February 2016.

== Results ==
The race was started at 15:00.

Rank	Pair	Lane	Name	Country	Time	Diff
1st place, gold medalist(s)	10	o	Sven Kramer	NED	6:10.31	
2nd place, silver medalist(s)	9	o	Jorrit Bergsma	NED	6:10.66	+0.35
3rd place, bronze medalist(s)	10	i	Sverre Lunde Pedersen	NOR	6:15.08	+4.77
4	9	i	Patrick Beckert	GER	6:18.45	+8.14
5	8	i	Ted-Jan Bloemen	CAN	6:18.81	+8.50
6	7	o	Peter Michael	NZL	6:19.11	+8.80
7	7	i	Bart Swings	BEL	6:19.13	+8.82
8	5	o	Alexis Contin	FRA	6:20.92	+10.61
9	8	o	Douwe de Vries	NED	6:21.49	+11.18
10	6	o	Andrea Giovannini	ITA	6:23.32	+13.01
11	6	i	Jordan Belchos	CAN	6:25.86	+15.55
12	4	i	Håvard Bøkko	NOR	6:26.14	+15.83
13	5	i	Moritz Geisreiter	GER	6:27.20	+16.89
14	4	o	Jan Szymański	POL	6:27.68	+17.37
15	1	i	Yevgeny Seryaev	RUS	6:28.77	+18.46
16	2	o	Thomas-Henrik Søfteland	NOR	6:30.07	+19.76
17	3	o	Vitaly Mikhailov	BLR	6:33.78	+23.47
18	2	i	Ryosuke Tsuchiya	JPN	6:38.11	+27.80
19	3	i	Viktor-Hald Thorup	DEN	6:39.38	+29.07
–	1	o	Dmitry Babenko	KAZ		DSQ
