= 2016 KNSB Dutch Single Distance Championships – Men's 1000 m =

- Venue: Thialf, Heerenveen
- Dates: 29 December 2015

Medalist men
1st place, gold medalist(s)		Kjeld Nuis	NED
2nd place, silver medalist(s)		Kai Verbij	NED
3rd place, bronze medalist(s)		Stefan Groothuis	NED

The men's 1000 meter at the 2016 KNSB Dutch Single Distance Championships took place in Heerenveen at the Thialf ice skating rink on Tuesday 29 December 2015. There were 20 participants.

== Statistics ==
=== Result ===
Position	Skater	Heat	Lane	Time
1st place, gold medalist(s)	Kjeld Nuis	8	O	1:08.24
2nd place, silver medalist(s)	Kai Verbij	8	I	1:08.57
3rd place, bronze medalist(s)	Stefan Groothuis	10	O	1:09.05
4	Thomas Krol	9	I	1:09.31
5	Hein Otterspeer	7	O	1:09.43
6	Lennart Velema	10	I	1:09.73
7	Pim Schipper	9	O	1:09.85
8	Martijn van Oosten	6	O	1:10.07
9	Lucas van Alphen	7	I	1:10.31
10	Sjoerd de Vries	5	I	1:10.37
11	Aron Romeijn	4	I	1:10.55
12	Peter Groen	5	O	1:10.66 PB
13	Dai Dai Ntab	4	O	1:10.81
14	Wesly Dijs	1	O	1:10.94 PB
15	Jesper Hospes	3	O	1:11.14
16	Gijs Esders	2	O	1:11.36 PB
17	Arvin Wijsman	3	I	1:11.78
18	Thijs Roozen	2	I	1:11.96
19	Niek Deelstra	1	I	1:12.02 PB
20	Joost Born	6	I	1:12.05

Referee: Jan Bolt. Starter: Raymond Micka
Start: 17:13 hr. Finish: 17:41 hr

=== Draw ===
Heat	Inside lane	Outside lane
1	Niek Deelstra	Wesly Dijs
2	Thijs Roozen	Gijs Esders
3	Arvin Wijsman	Jesper Hospes
4	Aron Romeijn	Dai Dai Ntab
5	Sjoerd de Vries	Peter Groen
6	Joost Born	Martijn van Oosten
7	Lucas van Alphen	Hein Otterspeer
8	Kai Verbij	Kjeld Nuis
9	Thomas Krol	Pim Schipper
10	Lennart Velema	Stefan Groothuis
