= 2016 KNSB Dutch Single Distance Championships – Men's 5000 m =

Dutch speed skating competition

- Venue: Thialf, Heerenveen
- Dates: 27 December 2015
- Competitors: 18 skaters

Medalist men
1st place, gold medalist(s)		Sven Kramer	NED
2nd place, silver medalist(s)		Jorrit Bergsma	NED
3rd place, bronze medalist(s)		Douwe de Vries	NED

The men's 5000 meter at the 2016 KNSB Dutch Single Distance Championships took place in Heerenveen at the Thialf ice skating rink on Sunday 27 December 2015. There were 18 participants.

== Statistics ==
=== Result ===
Position	Skater	Heat	Lane	Time
1st place, gold medalist(s)	Sven Kramer	8	I	6:11.34
2nd place, silver medalist(s)	Jorrit Bergsma	8	O	6:13.19
3rd place, bronze medalist(s)	Douwe de Vries	9	O	6:19.90
4	Erik Jan Kooiman	7	O	6:20.54
5	Bob de Vries	6	I	6:21.12
6	Jan Blokhuijsen	6	O	6:21.57
7	Arjan Stroetinga	9	I	6:21.76
8	Evert Hoolwerf	4	I	6:24.38 PB
9	Simon Schouten	7	I	6:29.42
10	Bob de Jong	4	O	6:29.76
11	Patrick Roest	2	I	6:29.90
12	Bart Mol	5	I	6:30.57
13	Mats Stoltenborg	2	O	6:30.93 PB
14	Marcel Bosker	1	O	6:33.50
15	Marcel van Ham	1	I	6:35.05
16	Frank Vreugdenhil	5	O	6:35.73
17	Jos de Vos	3	O	6:41.39
NC	Renz Rotteveel	3	I	DNF

=== Draw ===
Heat	Inside lane	Outside lane
1	Marcel van Ham	Marcel Bosker
2	Patrick Roest	Mats Stoltenborg
3	Renz Rotteveel	Jos de Vos
4	Evert Hoolwerf	Bob de Jong
5	Bart Mol	Frank Vreugdenhil
6	Bob de Vries	Jan Blokhuijsen
7	Simon Schouten	Erik Jan Kooiman
8	Sven Kramer	Jorrit Bergsma
9	Arjan Stroetinga	Douwe de Vries
