= 2016 KNSB Dutch Single Distance Championships – Men's 1500 m =

- Venue: Thialf, Heerenveen
- Dates: 28 December 2015
- Competitors: 20 skaters

Medalist men
1st place, gold medalist(s)		Kjeld Nuis	NED
2nd place, silver medalist(s)		Thomas Krol	NED
3rd place, bronze medalist(s)		Stefan Groothuis	NED

The men's 1500 meter at the 2016 KNSB Dutch Single Distance Championships took place in Heerenveen at the Thialf ice skating rink on Monday 28 December 2015. There were 20 participants.

== Statistics ==
=== Result ===
Position	Skater	Heat	Lane	Time
1st place, gold medalist(s)	Kjeld Nuis	8	O	1:45.53
2nd place, silver medalist(s)	Thomas Krol	9	I	1:46.20
3rd place, bronze medalist(s)	Stefan Groothuis	4	I	1:46.88
4	Patrick Roest	8	I	1:47.46 PB
5	Lennart Velema	7	O	1:47.92
6	Lucas van Alphen	7	I	1:47.95
7	Jan Blokhuijsen	9	O	1:48.23
8	Sven Kramer	10	I	1:48.45
9	Peter Groen	6	O	1:48.53 PB
10	Douwe de Vries	10	O	1:48.92
11	Martijn van Oosten	4	O	1:49.03 PB
12	Wesly Dijs	5	O	1:49.11 PB
13	Jorrit Bergsma	3	I	1:49.29
14	Arjan Stroetinga	6	I	1:49.47
15	Sjoerd de Vries	3	O	1:50.05
16	Thijs Roozen	2	I	1:51.29
17	Kars Jansman	1	I	1:52.22 PB
18	Remco Schouten	1	O	1:53.95
19	Mart Bruggink	2	O	1:56.12
NC	Marcel Bosker	5	I	DNF
NC	Pim Schipper	WDR		

Referee: Jan Bolt. Starter: Raymond Micka
Start: 16:25 hr. Finish: 16:54 hr.

=== Draw ===
Heat	Inside lane	Outside lane
1	Kars Jansman	Remco Schouten
2	Thijs Roozen	Mart Bruggink
3	Jorrit Bergsma	Sjoerd de Vries
4	Stefan Groothuis	Martijn van Oosten
5	Marcel Bosker	Wesly Dijs
6	Arjan Stroetinga	Peter Groen
7	Lucas van Alphen	Lennart Velema
8	Patrick Roest	Kjeld Nuis
9	Thomas Krol	Jan Blokhuijsen
10	Sven Kramer	Douwe de Vries
