= Top Gear Winter Olympics =

- Presented by: Jeremy Clarkson; Richard Hammond; James May; The Stig
- Country of origin: United Kingdom

Production
- Producer: Andy Wilman
- Running time: 60 minutes

Original release
- Network: BBC Two
- Release: 12 February 2006

Related
- Top Gear; Top Ground Gear Force

Top Gear: Winter Olympics is a full-length, special edition episode for BBC motoring programme Top Gear, and is the first in a series of full-length specials for the show. The episode was aired on 12 February 2006, with a repeat of the episode being aired a week later on 19 February. The special saw hosts Jeremy Clarkson, Richard Hammond and James May travelling to Lillehammer, Norway and creating their own version of the Winter Olympics with cars. The episode was later released on DVD on 5 June later that year. Unlike most of the subsequent specials, this special was not based around long distance cheap car road trip challenge, but rather mostly new cars that were on the market taking part in modified versions of Winter Olympic sport save for the Ski Jump challenge involving an old Leyland Mini. The only other Top Gear special ( produced from 2006 onwards) not to be centred around a cheap vehicle challenge was the Top Gear: Polar Special which involved a modern Toyota Hilux up against a dog sled.

== Summary ==
With the 20th Winter Olympic Games being held in Turin, Italy, Top Gear decides to do its own version with cars, with Jeremy Clarkson and James May heading to one of the Winter Games' former venues – Lillehammer, in Norway, used during the 1994 Winter Games – and beginning proceedings, despite Richard Hammond not being there; he was apparently "appearing on commercial daytime television" – referring to Richard Hammond's 5 O'Clock Show – while the pair began the first set of events.

=== Events ===
- Biathlon

In a race between Clarkson and May, the pair took to a snowy, cross-country course with some off-road SUVs, where along the way, each presenter had to stop at 2 shooting rounds and hit all the targets in each round from the back of their cars, incurring a 5 seconds penalty for each target missed. May choose the Audi Q7 and used a standard Biathlon .22 rifle for the shooting rounds, while Clarkson raced in a Volvo XC90 and opted to use a H&K MP5 Sub machine gun, but despite the increased firepower, he missed all his targets on the first shooting round, allowing his rival to increase the lead he had. May's second shooting round was not as perfect as his first, and he incurred a ten-second penalty for missing targets, before crashing into a tree on his way to the finish line. Clarkson, although missing all his targets again in the second round, managed to overtake May as he was digging himself out, but just before he reached the end, Clarkson lost the lead to his rival, coming in second after May crossed the line and won the event.

- Cold Weather Endurance

Although not with them at Lillehammer, Hammond had earlier done a film for the special, in which he saw whether a man would break first from Arctic temperatures, or a car. Sitting within a Citroën C1, in a bid to see who would crack first, both the presenter and the car were subjected to ever decreasing temperatures, with Hammond testing the car's electrics and engine. Finally, after being subjected to a temperature of about minus-40 Celsius, Hammond could not start the C1 and thus proved that a man could last longer than the car, concluding that 'if you're going to drive to the North Pole, buy a Hammond'.

His conclusion was disproved when he took part in a race against a car to the North Pole, and lost, as was shown in the Polar Challenge following Series 9 of the show.

- Speed Skating

Returning to Norway, Clarkson prepared himself for a 3-lap race on the ice course of Vikingskipet Olympic Arena, between a Jaguar XK and a human skater, whom May introduced as Eskil Ervik. While Ervik got off to a good start, the XK could not utilize its power as the car had no grip on the ice and thus could only move forward slowly and not corner so well, while the wheels constantly spun upon the surface. Not only did this allow Ervik to win the race, it also allowed him to lap the XK twice.

- Off-Road Slalom

In another race between Clarkson and May, the presenters took to completing a course against the clock, on a frozen lake with just five inches of ice. The race was between a four-wheel drive Land Rover Discovery and another two-wheel drive Jaguar XK. The race ended with a dispute about the result – while May declared he was the winner by being the fastest with a time of 2:03.28, Clarkson claimed otherwise by saying that his run had been more graceful and interesting than his colleague's.

- Bobsleigh

In a re-run of a film shown during Series 5 Episode 8 of the show, Hammond and May travelled to Lillehammer in 2004 to make use of the 2 kilometres (1.2 mi) bobsleigh course. Their aim was to see if a bobsleigh team aided by Hammond, who would be subject to cornering forces of up to 5G, could beat a Mitsubishi Lancer Evolution rally car, which would be driven by Norwegian Henning Solberg with May as co-driver. For the rally car, it would run on a snowy dirt road that had exactly the same length of the course, not only starting and stopping the same places, but also consisting of slippery surfaces and sharp corners. While the bobsleigh would be timed by the course officials, May would be timing the rally car. Despite a close race, the bobsleigh turned in a time of 59.68 at the end, beating the rally car by just over 2 seconds after it came in with a time of 1:02.24.

- Ice Hockey

On a break from daytime television, Hammond finally arrived in Lillehammer, and prepared himself to take on May in a game of "5-a-side Car Ice Hockey". Using ten Suzuki Swifts and with Clarkson acting as referee, Hammond was captain of "team daytime television" who played in Montreal Canadiens colours, while May was captain of "team primetime television" who played in Buffalo Sabres colours. From the start, Hammond's team played well and led 3–0, but a biased Clarkson began intervening in the match and allowed May to catch up with two goals, allowing the score to be 3–2. After one of the Swifts had to be replaced, Hammond crashed into May's car and was sent to the penalty box ("sin bin"), before being allowed out after May attempted to score more goals, just as the match ended, with his side winning. Although Hammond declared he was returning to daytime television following the match, upon learning what the next event was planning, he quickly declared he was staying for it.

Behind the scenes, the score supposedly had been 5–4 to Hammond's team, although only three of May's team's goals were shown in the programme.

- Ski Jump

After watching a skier perform a ski jump off a downhill slope, the presenters learned they had been tasked to see if they could get a 1986 Mini to do the same jump and landing it further than the skier did. After thinking over whether this could be done with the car's own power, May revealed it would not have any chance of success; there was also concerns it would be unsafe for anyone drive the Mini while attempting the ski jump. Thus, Clarkson called in for help from the United Kingdom Rocketry Association.

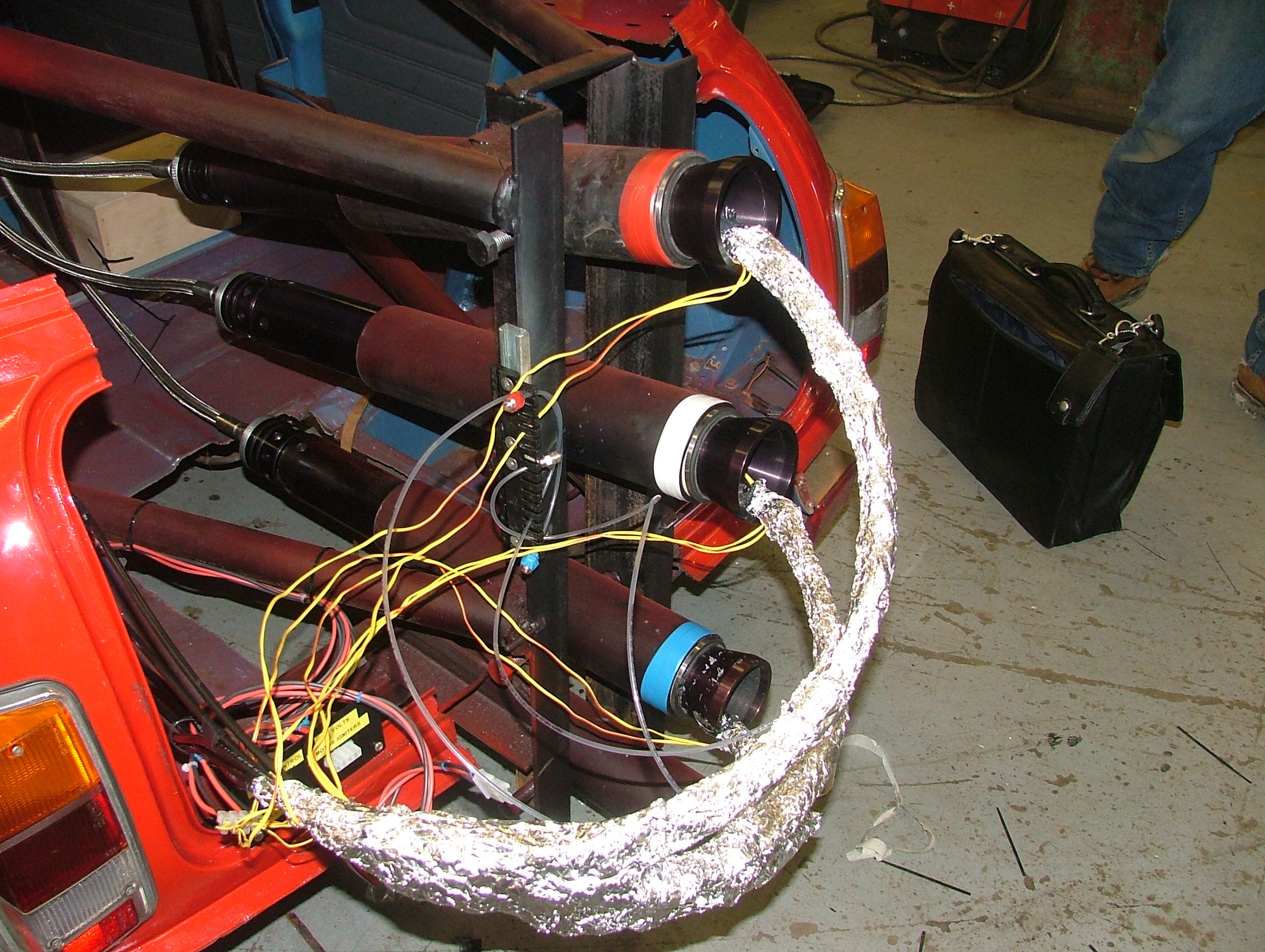
Propulsion for the unmanned Mini was provided by 3 rocket motors put into the rear of the car

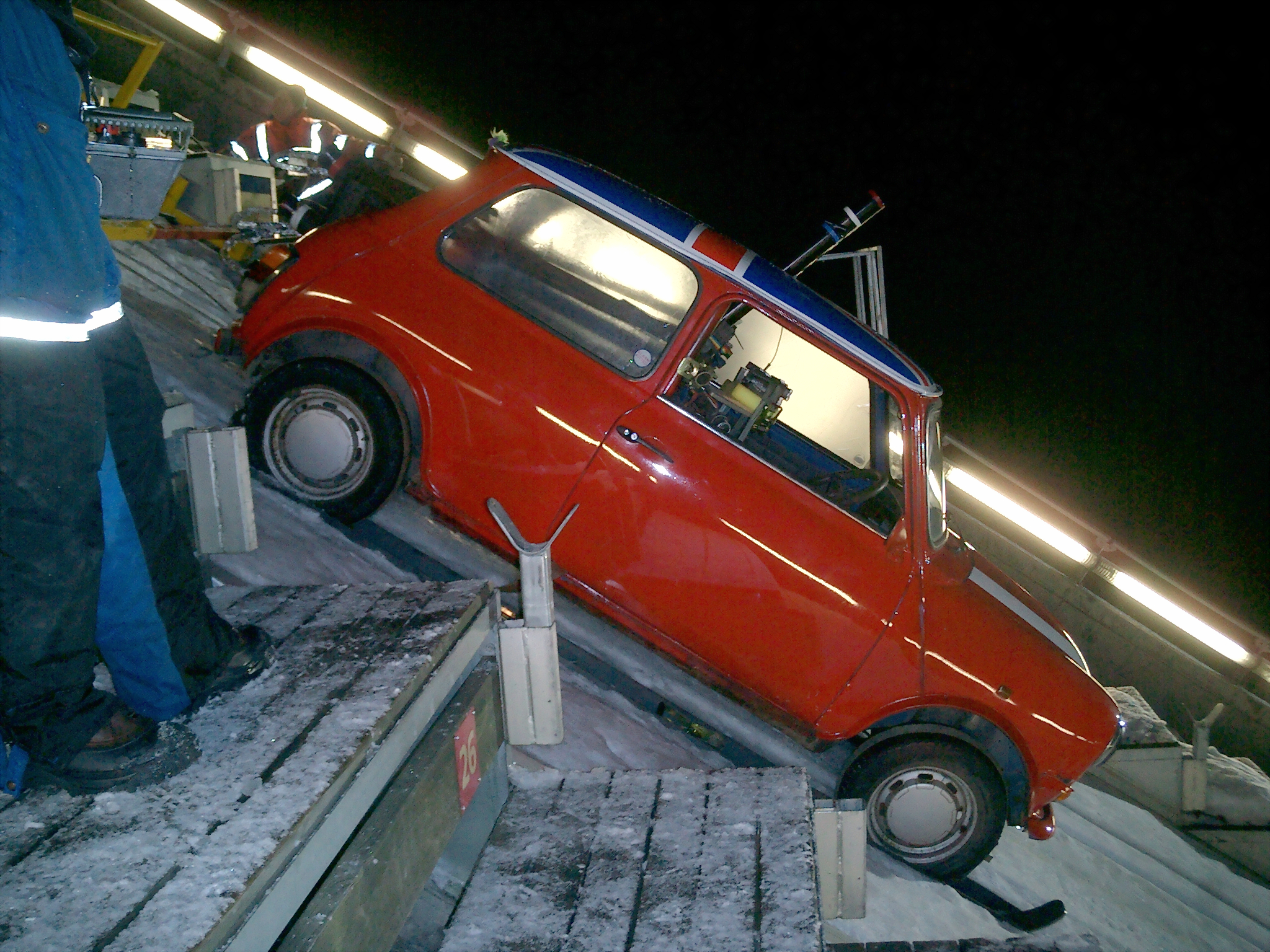
To get it into position, the Mini was winched to the top of the slope along the specially cut groves for the jump. The custom-made skis can be seen beneath the car's tyres

The following day, May, tasked with handling the unmanned Mini's guidance, revealed that the car would need skis for the special groves that would be cut for it on the ski jump they were using. The Rocketry Association, who were working on the Power for the jump (with Clarkson's help), decided to also work on making some custom-made skis for the Mini upon learning of this. Meanwhile, Hammond began work on setting up a barrier to stop the Mini after it made its jump, but after making a clumsy one before the wrong jump, recruited a herd of tractors to set up a wall of hay bales at the bottom of the jump, backed with a large snow bank to ensure the car stopped fully and safely. As night fell, the Mini, now laden with rockets, was carefully put into place on the special groves and winched to the top of the jump, given final checks, and eventually was launched down the jump. Although it failed to beat the skier's distance, the presenters were more than satisfied that the Mini had managed to successfully do the ski jump, which was extraordinary feat in itself.

With the final event completed, Hammond left, while Clarkson and May decided to stay behind for one last challenge – to see if a ski jump could be done by a snowmobile. For this last challenge, the pair revealed that The Stig had been saved for this task, and successfully performed the jump with the snowmobile, with Clarkson joking about the pain he would be feeling from his landing, as the special came to an end.

The end credits of the edited as a reference to the members of Swedish pop group ABBA, with Jeremy Clarkson shown as Björn Clarkson, Richard Hammond as Benny Hammond, James May as Agnetha May and The Stig as Anni-Frid Stig, whilst every other crew member had their first name replaced with Björn.

== Vehicles ==
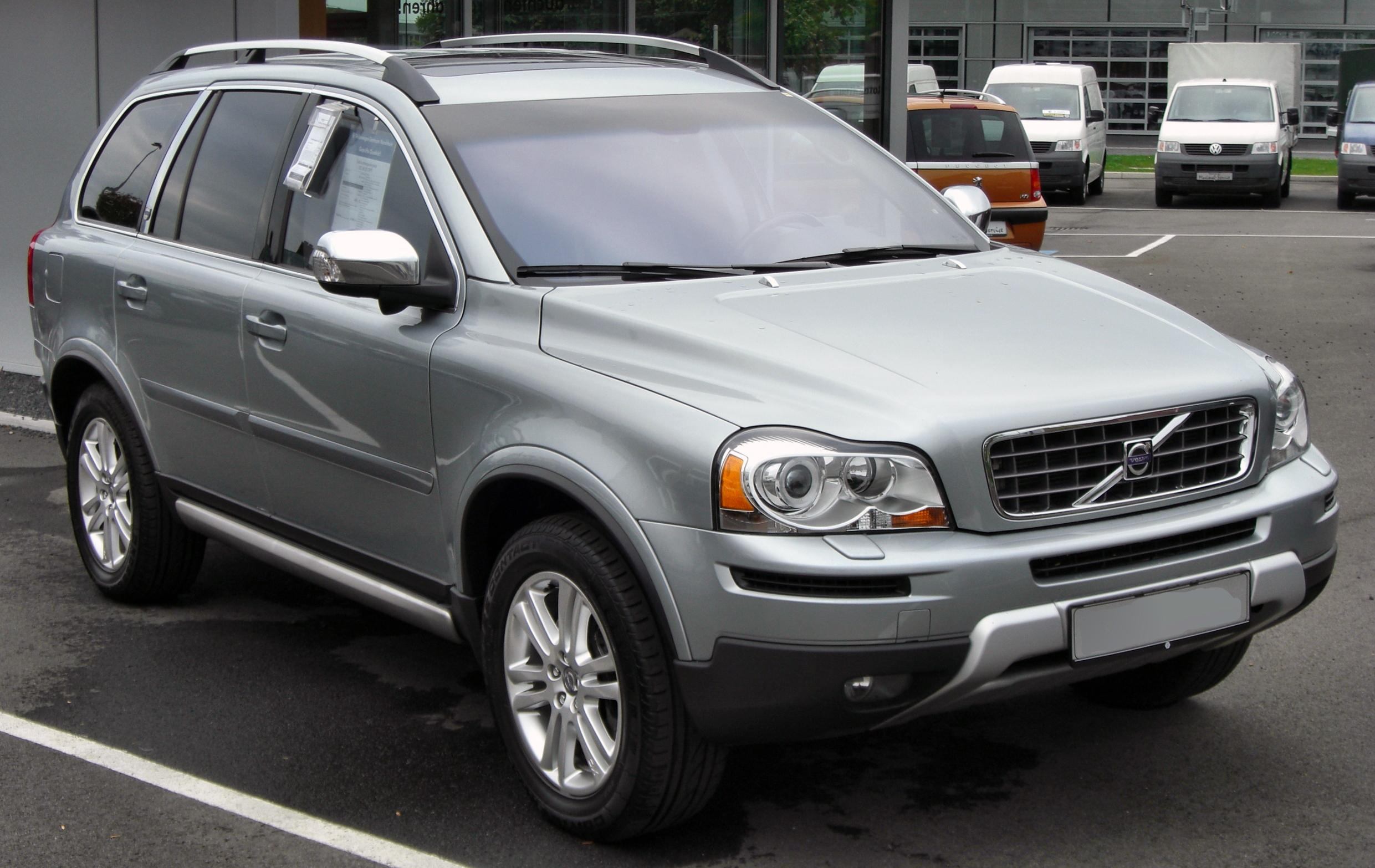
Volvo XC90

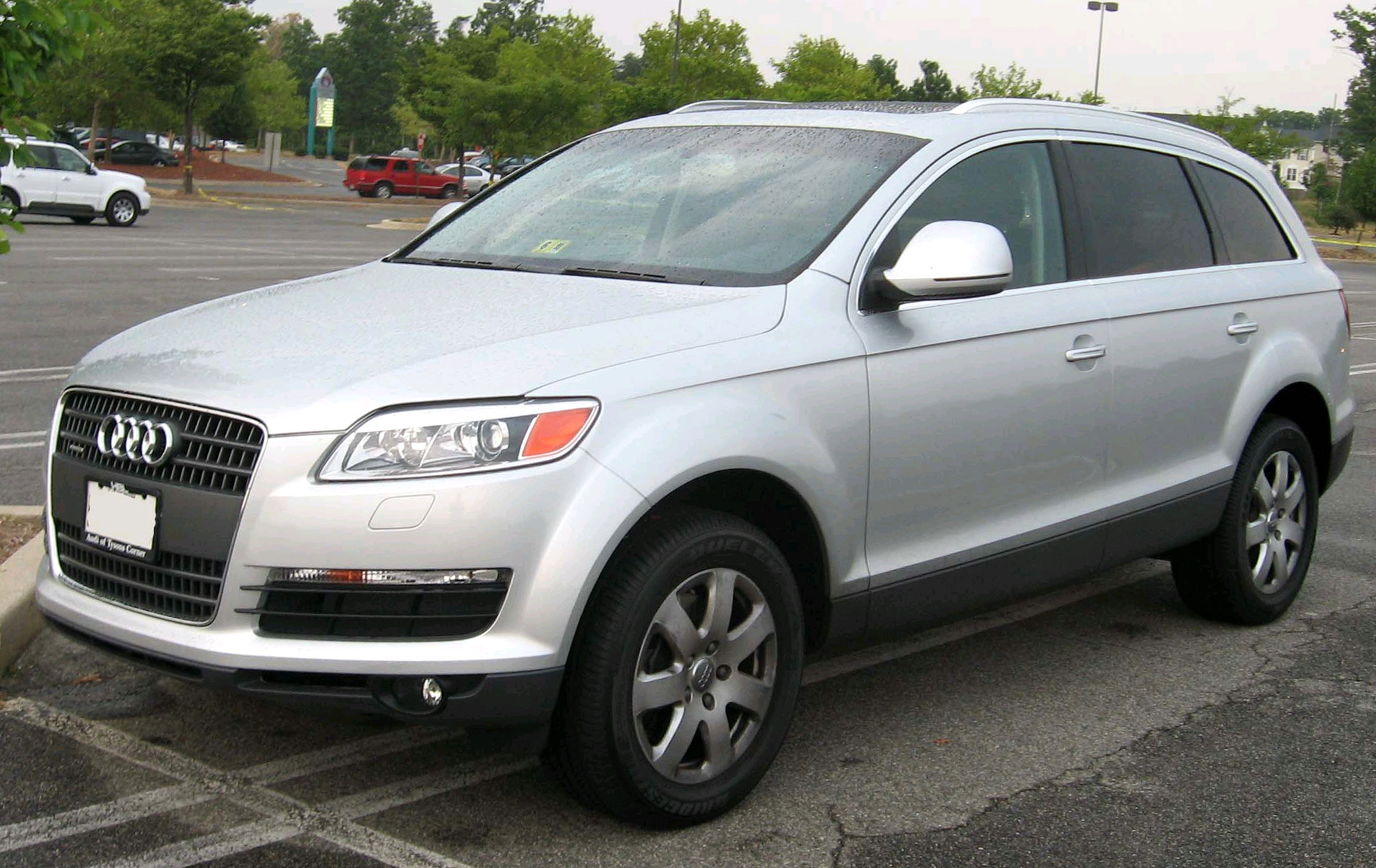
Audi Q7

The following vehicles below were used in the filming of this special episode of Top Gear:

- Volvo XC90
- Audi Q7
- Citroën C1
- Jaguar XK
- Land Rover Discovery
- Mitsubishi Lancer Evolution
- Suzuki Swift
- Mini

== Reception ==
The motoring programme's Winter Olympics Special was viewed by 5 million people on its first showing, with a further 530,000 watching the repeat when it aired a week later. In a review for The Guardian, Kathryn Flett described the Winter Olympics Special as a funny episode, with the Mini segment making her "giggle", before adding that the special was "entirely complementary to the Winter Olympics proper".
