= Gerard Kemkers =

Dutch speed skater

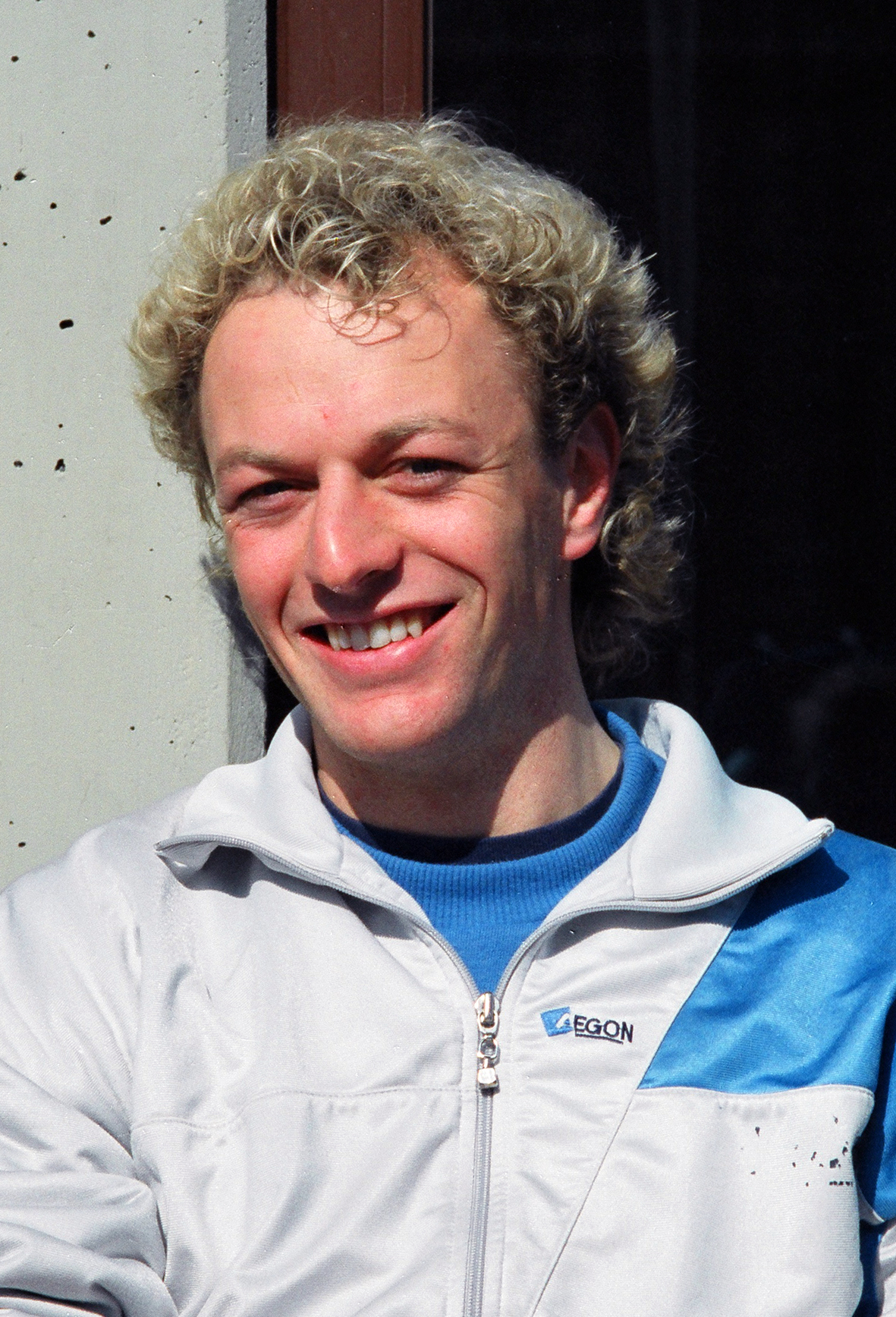

Personal information
- Nationality: Dutch
- Born: 8 March 1967 (age 59) Groningen, Netherlands
- Height: 1.80 m (5 ft 11 in)
- Weight: 71 kg (157 lb)

Sport
- Country: Netherlands
- Sport: Speed skating
- Turned pro: 1985
- Retired: 1990

Achievements and titles
- Personal best(s): 500 m: 38.30 (1988); 1000 m: 1:15.85 (1990); 1500 m: 1:56.13 (1990); 5000 m: 6:45.92 (1988); 10 000 m: 14:03.90 (1988)
Medal record
Men's speed skating
Representing the Netherlands
Olympic Games
Bronze medal – third place	1988 Calgary	5,000 m
World Championships
Silver medal – second place	1989 Oslo	Allround
European Championships
Bronze medal – third place	1988 The Hague	Allround
Silver medal – second place	1989 Gothenburg	Allround

Gerard Kemkers (born 8 March 1967) is a former speed skater from the Netherlands, who represented his native country at the 1988 Winter Olympics in Calgary, Canada. There he won the bronze medal in the 5000 metres.

Kemkers retired from international competition in 1990 and became a coach.

During the 2006 Winter Olympics in Turin, Italy, he coached Ireen Wüst to two medals: 3000 m gold and 1500 m bronze, and Sven Kramer to a silver medal on the 5000 m.

During the 2010 Winter Olympics in Vancouver he coached Sven Kramer to the gold medal at the 5000 m and Ireen Wüst to the gold medal on the 1500 m. During Kramer's 10 km race, Kemkers made a mistake and guided Kramer to the wrong lane. Kramer finished first, with a time of 12:54.50 (having skated one more turn than he should have in the inner lane and one fewer in the outer lane), but was disqualified for failing to change lanes. As a result, Lee Seung-hoon won gold with a new Olympic record, 12:58.55. Kramer later said, "At the end of the day, it is my responsibility. I am the skater on the ice, I have to do it".

== Records ==
=== Personal records ===
Personal records
Men's speed skating
Event	Result	Date	Location	Notes
500 meter	38.30	5 March 1988	Alma–Ata	
1000 meter	1:15.85	11 March 1990	Heerenveen	
1500 meter	1:56.13	10 March 1990	Heerenveen	
3000 meter	3:59.60	19 March 1987	Heerenveen	
5000 meter	6:45.92	17 February 1988	Calgary	
10000 meter	14:03.90	6 December 1987	Calgary	
Small combination	160.454	16–17 March 1990	Inzell	

=== World records ===
Nr.	Event	Result	Date	Location	Note
1.	Small combination	160.454	16–17 March 1990	Inzell	World record until 17 February 1991

== Tournament overview ==
Season	Dutch Championships Single Distances	Dutch Championships Allround	European Championships Allround	Olympic Games	World Cup	World Championships Allround	World Championships Allround Juniors
1984–1985							RØROS 8th 500m (bronze) 3000m 10th 1500m (silver) 5000m 4th overall
1985–1986		ASSEN 4th 500m (gold) 5000m 4th 1500m (gold) 10000m (silver) overall			17th 1500m 7th 5000m/10000m	INZELL 10th 500m 10th 5000m 11th 1500m (silver) 10000m 4th overall	
1986–1987	THE HAGUE UTRECHT 15th 500m (bronze) 1500m 4th 5000m 4th 10000m	DEVENTER (silver) 500m (silver) 5000m (silver) 1500m (silver) 10000m (silver) overall	TRONDHEIM 7th 500m 11th 5000m 11th 1500m 11th 10000m 9th overall		17th 1500m 7th 5000m/10000m	HEERENVEEN 14th 500m 4th 5000m 17th 1500m 4th 10000m 5th overall	
1987–1988	HEERENVEEN (gold) 5000m (silver) 10000m	ALKMAAR (gold) 500m (gold) 5000m (bronze) 1500m (silver) 10000m (silver) overall	THE HAGUE 7th 500m 4th 5000m 8th 1500m 5th 10000m (bronze) overall	CALGARY (bronze) 5000m 5th 10000m	29th 1000m (silver) 1500m	ALMA–ATA 9th 500m 38th 5000m 16th 1500m DNQ 10000m NC overall	
1988–1989	HEERENVEEN 11th 500m (silver) 1500m (gold) 5000m DQ 10000m	THE HAGUE (gold) 500m (bronze) 5000m 5th 1500m (silver) 10000m (silver) overall	GOTHENBURG 13th 500m (silver) 5000m 14th 1500m (silver) 10000m (silver) overall		10th 1000m (gold) 5000m/10000m	OSLO 19th 500m 4th 5000m 7th 1500m (bronze) 10000m (silver) overall	
1989–1990	HEERENVEEN 17th 500m 7th 1500m 4th 5000m 5th 10000m	ASSEN (gold) 500m (bronze) 5000m 7th 1500m (silver) 10000m (silver) overall			34th 500m 25th 1000m 9th 1500m 5th 5000m/10000m	INNSBRUCK 4th 500m 4th5000m 4th 1500m 6th 10000m 4th overall	

== Medals won ==
Championship	Gold (gold)	Silver (silver)	Bronze (bronze)
Dutch Single Distances	2	2	2
Dutch Allround	0	5	0
European Allround	0	1	1
Olympic Games	0	0	1
World Cup	1	1	0
World Allround	0	1	0
World Allround Juniors	0	0	0

== Overview of championships won by speed skaters coached by Kemkers ==
Tournament	Medal	Number	Winners
10000m men	1st place, gold medalist(s)	1	Uytdehaage 2002
5000m men	1st place, gold medalist(s)	3	Uytdehaage 2002 Kramer 2010, 2014
3000m women	1st place, gold medalist(s)	2	Wüst 2006, 2014
1500m women	1st place, gold medalist(s)	1	Wüst 2010
World Allround men	1st place, gold medalist(s)	8	Uytdehaage 2002 Kramer 2007, 2008, 2009, 2010, 2012, 2013 Verweij 2014
World Allround women	1st place, gold medalist(s)	7	Groenewold 2004 van Deutekom 2008 Wüst 2007, 2011, 2012, 2013, 2014
European Allround men	1st place, gold medalist(s)	8	Uytdehaage 2002, 2005 Kramer 2007, 2008, 2009, 2010, 2012, 2013
European Allround women	1st place, gold medalist(s)	3	Wüst 2008, 2013, 2014
Dutch Allround men	1st place, gold medalist(s)	10	Uytdehaage 2001, 2004 Kramer 2005, 2007, 2008, 2009, 2013 Olde Heuvel 2010, 2011 Verweij 2014
Dutch Allround women	1st place, gold medalist(s)	5	Groenewold 2003, 2004 Wüst 2007, 2008, 2009
Dutch Sprint men	1st place, gold medalist(s)	1	Wennemars 2007

== Other achievements ==
- Netherlands sport coach of the year (2006 and 2013)
