= 2016 KNSB Dutch Single Distance Championships – Men's 10,000 m =

Dutch speed skating competition

2016 KNSB Dutch Single Distance Championships – Men's 10000 m
- Venue: Thialf, Heerenveen
- Dates: 29 December 2015
- Competitors: 10 skaters

Medalist men
1st place, gold medalist(s)		Sven Kramer	NED
2nd place, silver medalist(s)		Erik Jan Kooiman	NED
3rd place, bronze medalist(s)		Bob de Vries	NED

The men's 10,000 meter at the 2016 KNSB Dutch Single Distance Championships took place in Heerenveen at the Thialf ice skating rink on Tuesday 29 December 2015. There were 10 participants.

== Statistics ==
=== Result ===
Position	Skater	Time
1st place, gold medalist(s)	Sven Kramer	12:58.71
2nd place, silver medalist(s)	Erik Jan Kooiman	13:05.22
3rd place, bronze medalist(s)	Bob de Vries	13:06.40
4	Jouke Hoogeveen	13:09.50 PR
5	Arjan Stroetinga	13:09.68
6	Mats Stoltenborg	13:20.22 PR
7	Douwe de Vries	13:21.56
8	Frank Vreugdenhil	13:50.45
NC	Bob de Jong	DQ
NC	Jorrit Bergsma	DQ

Referee: Jan Bolt. Starter: Jan Zwier
Begin: 14:15 hr. Finish: 16:19 hr.

=== Draw ===
Heat	Inside lane	Outside lane
1	Douwe de Vries	Frank Vreugdenhil
2	Jouke Hoogeveen	Arjan Stroetinga
3	Bob de Jong	Mats Stoltenborg
4	Erik Jan Kooiman	Sven Kramer
5	Jorrit Bergsma	Bob de Vries
