= 2016 KNSB Dutch Single Distance Championships – Men's 500 m =

Dutch speed skating competition

- Venue: Thialf, Heerenveen
- Dates: 27 December 2015
- Competitors: 20 skaters

Medalist men
1st place, gold medalist(s)		Kai Verbij	NED
2nd place, silver medalist(s)		Jan Smeekens	NED
3rd place, bronze medalist(s)		Ronald Mulder	NED

The men's 500 meter at the 2016 KNSB Dutch Single Distance Championships took place in Heerenveen at the Thialf ice skating rink on Sunday 27 December 2015. Although the tournament was held in 2015 it was part of the 2015–2016 speed skating season. There were 20 participants.

== Result ==
Position	Skater	1st. 500 meter	2nd. 500 meter	Time
1st place, gold medalist(s)	Kai Verbij	34.918 (1)	34.983 (2)	69.901 PR
2nd place, silver medalist(s)	Jan Smeekens	34.981 (2)	35.047 (4)	70.028
3rd place, bronze medalist(s)	Ronald Mulder	35.119 (4)	34.958 (1)	70.077 PR
4	Dai Dai N'tab	35.008 (3)	35.072 (5)	70.080
5	Hein Otterspeer	35.739 (10)	35.015 (3)	70.754
6	Pim Schipper	35.301 (5)	35.456 (9)	70.757
7	Jesper Hospes	35.467 (6)	35.382 (7)	70.849
8	Michel Mulder	35.626 (9)	35.349 (6)	70.975
9	Stefan Groothuis	35.526 (8)	35.571 (10)	71.097
10	Martijn van Oosten	35.763 (12)	35.384 (8) PR	71.147 PR
11	Niek Deelstra	35.742 (11)	35.586 (11) PR	71.328 PR
12	Sjoerd de Vries	35.830 (14)	35.777 (12)	71.607
13	Arvin Wijsman	36.142 (15)	36.110 (14)	72.252 PR
14	Oscar van Leen	36.240 (16)	36.148 (15)	72.388
15	Mark Nomden	36.431 (18)	36.158 (16)	72.589 PR
16	Joep Baks	36.353 (17)	36.304 (17) PR	72.657 PR
17	Gijs Esders	36.683 (19)	36.106 (13)	72.789 PR
NC	Aron Romeijn	35.790 (13)	DQ	
NC	Thomas Krol	35.490 (7)	WDR	
NC	Gerben Jorritsma	DNF		
NC	Joost Born	WDR		
