= 2017 World Single Distances Speed Skating Championships – Men's 5000 metres =

Men's 5000 metres at the 2017 World Single Distances Speed Skating Championships
- Venue: Gangneung Oval
- Location: Gangneung, South Korea
- Dates: 9 February
- Competitors: 20 from 12 nations
- Winning time: 6:06.82

Medalists
gold medal	Sven Kramer	Netherlands
silver medal	Jorrit Bergsma	Netherlands
bronze medal	Peter Michael	New Zealand

The Men's 5000 metres competition at the 2017 World Single Distances Speed Skating Championships was held on 9 February 2017.

== Results ==
The race started at 18:38.

Rank	Pair	Lane	Name	Country	Time	Diff
1st place, gold medalist(s)	9	i	Sven Kramer	Netherlands	6:06.82	
2nd place, silver medalist(s)	9	o	Jorrit Bergsma	Netherlands	6:09.33	+2.51
3rd place, bronze medalist(s)	8	o	Peter Michael	New Zealand	6:11.67	+4.85
4	8	i	Douwe de Vries	Netherlands	6:13.70	+6.88
5	10	o	Ted-Jan Bloemen	Canada	6:14.73	+7.91
6	4	o	Sverre Lunde Pedersen	Norway	6:15.77	+8.95
7	10	i	Patrick Beckert	Germany	6:16.52	+9.70
8	5	o	Jordan Belchos	Canada	6:16.92	+10.10
9	6	i	Bart Swings	Belgium	6:17.20	+10.38
10	3	o	Alexis Contin	France	6:18.87	+12.05
11	3	i	Michele Malfatti	Italy	6:20.40	+13.58
12	5	i	Andrea Giovannini	Italy	6:21.78	+14.96
13	6	o	Nicola Tumolero	Italy	6:22.31	+15.49
14	7	o	Moritz Geisreiter	Germany	6:23.71	+16.89
15	7	i	Ryosuke Tsuchiya	Japan	6:25.95	+19.13
16	4	i	Shane Williamson	Japan	6:27.29	+20.47
17	1	o	Viktor Hald Thorup	Denmark	6:27.37	+20.55
18	2	o	Danila Semerikov	Russia	6:28.16	+21.34
19	1	i	Dmitry Babenko	Kazakhstan	6:28.41	+21.59
20	2	i	Danil Sinitsyn	Russia	6:41.89	+35.07
