= Sven Kramer =

Dutch speed skater (born 1986)

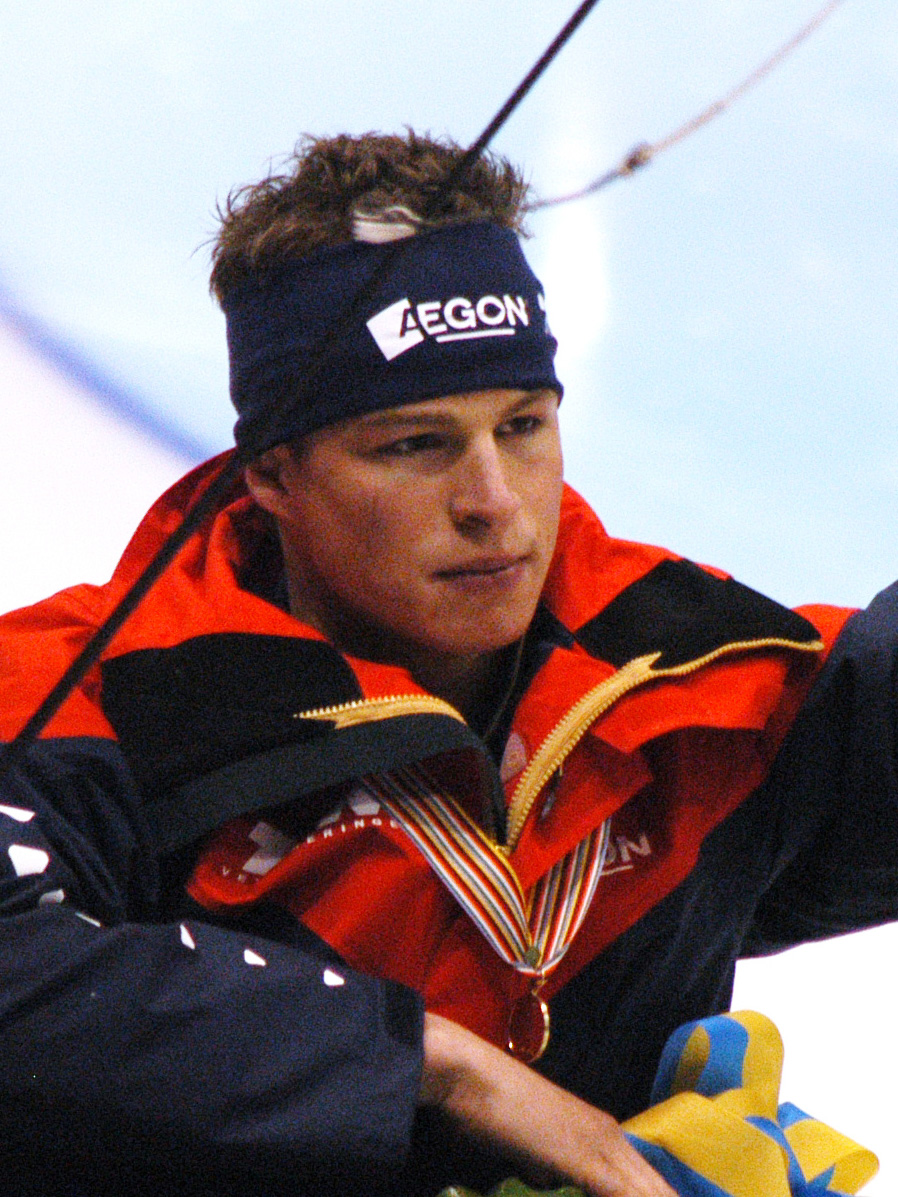
- Sven Kramer after winning the 2009 European Speed Skating Championships in Heerenveen

Personal information
- Nationality: Dutch
- Born: 23 April 1986 (age 40) Heerenveen, Netherlands
- Height: 1.87 m (6 ft 2 in)
- Weight: 83 kg (183 lb)
- Website: www.svenkramer.nl

Sport
- Country: Netherlands
- Sport: Speed skating
- Event(s): 5000 m, 10000 m
- Turned pro: 2003
- Retired: 2022

Achievements and titles
- Personal best(s): 500 m: 36.17 (2009); 1500 m: 1:43.54 (2009); 3000 m: 3:37.39 (2019); 5000 m: 6:03:32 (2007); 10 000 m: 12:38.89 (2017)
Medal record
Men's speed skating
Representing Netherlands
Event	1st	2nd	3rd
Olympic Games	4	2	3
World Allround	9	0	3
World Distance	21	3	2
European Allround	10	1	0
European Distance	2	1	0
World Junior	1	1	0
Total	47	8	8
Olympic Games
Gold medal – first place	2010 Vancouver	5000 m
Gold medal – first place	2014 Sochi	5000 m
Gold medal – first place	2014 Sochi	Team pursuit
Gold medal – first place	2018 Pyeongchang	5000 m
Silver medal – second place	2006 Turin	5000 m
Silver medal – second place	2014 Sochi	10,000 m
Bronze medal – third place	2006 Turin	Team pursuit
Bronze medal – third place	2010 Vancouver	Team pursuit
Bronze medal – third place	2018 Pyeongchang	Team pursuit
World Allround Championships
Gold medal – first place	2007 Heerenveen	Allround
Gold medal – first place	2008 Berlin	Allround
Gold medal – first place	2009 Hamar	Allround
Gold medal – first place	2010 Heerenveen	Allround
Gold medal – first place	2012 Moscow	Allround
Gold medal – first place	2013 Hamar	Allround
Gold medal – first place	2015 Calgary	Allround
Gold medal – first place	2016 Berlin	Allround
Gold medal – first place	2017 Hamar	Allround
Bronze medal – third place	2005 Moscow	Allround
Bronze medal – third place	2006 Calgary	Allround
Bronze medal – third place	2019 Calgary	Allround
World Single Distance Championships
Gold medal – first place	2007 Salt Lake City	5000 m
Gold medal – first place	2007 Salt Lake City	10,000 m
Gold medal – first place	2007 Salt Lake City	Team pursuit
Gold medal – first place	2008 Nagano	5000 m
Gold medal – first place	2008 Nagano	10,000 m
Gold medal – first place	2008 Nagano	Team pursuit
Gold medal – first place	2009 Vancouver	5000 m
Gold medal – first place	2009 Vancouver	10,000 m
Gold medal – first place	2009 Vancouver	Team pursuit
Gold medal – first place	2012 Heerenveen	5000 m
Gold medal – first place	2012 Heerenveen	Team pursuit
Gold medal – first place	2013 Sochi	5000 m
Gold medal – first place	2013 Sochi	Team pursuit
Gold medal – first place	2015 Heerenveen	5000 m
Gold medal – first place	2015 Heerenveen	Team pursuit
Gold medal – first place	2016 Kolomna	5000 m
Gold medal – first place	2016 Kolomna	10,000 m
Gold medal – first place	2017 Gangneung	5000 m
Gold medal – first place	2017 Gangneung	10,000 m
Gold medal – first place	2019 Inzell	Team pursuit
Gold medal – first place	2020 Salt Lake City	Team pursuit
Silver medal – second place	2008 Nagano	1500 m
Silver medal – second place	2013 Sochi	10,000 m
Silver medal – second place	2020 Salt Lake City	5000 m
Bronze medal – third place	2017 Gangneung	1500 m
Bronze medal – third place	2019 Inzell	5000 m
European Allround Championships
Gold medal – first place	2007 Collalbo	Allround
Gold medal – first place	2008 Kolomna	Allround
Gold medal – first place	2009 Heerenveen	Allround
Gold medal – first place	2010 Hamar	Allround
Gold medal – first place	2012 Budapest	Allround
Gold medal – first place	2013 Heerenveen	Allround
Gold medal – first place	2015 Chelyabinsk	Allround
Gold medal – first place	2016 Minsk	Allround
Gold medal – first place	2017 Heerenveen	Allround
Gold medal – first place	2019 Collalbo	Allround
Silver medal – second place	2005 Heerenveen	Allround
European Single Distance Championships
Gold medal – first place	2020 Heerenveen	Team pursuit
Gold medal – first place	2022 Heerenveen	Team pursuit
Silver medal – second place	2020 Heerenveen	5000 m
World Junior Championships
Gold medal – first place	2005 Seinäjoki	Allround
Silver medal – second place	2004 Roseville	Allround

Sven Kramer (Dutch pronunciation: [sfɛŋ ˈkraːmər]; born 23 April 1986) is a retired Dutch long track speed skater who has won an all-time record nine World Allround Championships as well as a record ten European Allround Championships. He is the Olympic champion of the 5000 meters at the Vancouver 2010, Sochi 2014 and Pyeongchang 2018 Olympics, and won a record 21 gold medals at the World Single Distance Championships; eight in the 5000 meters, five in the 10,000 meters, and eight in the team pursuit. Kramer used to be the world record holder in the team pursuit (alongside Douwe de Vries and Marcel Bosker) and broke the world records in the 5000 meter and 10,000 meter events three times. By winning the 2010 World Allround Championship, Kramer became the first speed skater in history to win four consecutive world allround championships and eight consecutive international all round championships. He was undefeated in the 18 international allround championships he participated in from the 2006/2007 season until the 2016/2017 season. From November 2007 to March 2009, he was ranked first in the Adelskalender, but despite his dominance as an all-round skater he has since been overtaken on that list by Shani Davis and, more recently, by his teammate Patrick Roest and Jordan Stolz.

On 27 March 2020, it was announced that Kramer extended his contract with the Jumbo-Visma speed skating team until the 2022 Winter Olympics.

On 28 October 2021 it was announced that Sven was going to retire in 2022.

== Personal life ==
Sven Kramer was born on 23 April 1986 in Heerenveen, Friesland, Netherlands. He is the son of former speed skater Yep Kramer, and the four-year-older brother of speed skater Brecht Kramer. He is a born Frisian.

Since 2007 he has been in a long-term relationship with Dutch field hockey player Naomi van As, and they welcomed a daughter in October 2018. And a son in 2022.

On 3 March 2010, Kramer was awarded as Knight of the Order of the Netherlands Lion for his services to sport, i.e., winning the Men's 5000 m speed skating competition at the 2010 Winter Olympics in Vancouver. On 12 March 2022, he was further appointed as Officer of the Order of Orange-Nassau for his exceptional performance in sport over the years.

== Speed skating career ==
=== Junior career ===
In the 2004 season, he came in second at the Junior allround world championships.

In December 2004, he won the Dutch Allround Championships at just 18 years old and thus qualified for the European Allround Championships for the first time, where he won the silver medal. He came third at the World Allround Championships 2005. At the end of that season, he signed a contract with the Dutch TVM-team.

Kramer set a new world record for the 5000 m in Salt Lake City on 19 November 2005, when he was 19 years old. With his time of 6:08.78, he also entered the top 10 of the all-time world ranking, the Adelskalender. The previous season he had become the Junior allround world champion.

Kramer stopped skating in the junior competition and became a senior speed skater when he was 20 years old.

=== Season 2005–2006 ===
On 11 February 2006, he won the silver medal in the 5000 m at the 2006 Winter Olympic in Turin. Kramer also participated in the team pursuit event. The Dutch team was the favourite and was leading Italy by nearly a full second in their semi-final, but Kramer stepped on a block and fell, taking Carl Verheijen with him. In the race for bronze, they defeated Norway, giving Kramer his second medal of the Games.

Kramer also competed in two other distances, the 1500 and the 10,000 meter. Due to a screw in his skate that broke just a few minutes before his race, Kramer came in 15th at the 1500. The 10,000 meters did not go as planned, and he finished in 7th. Afterward, Kramer stepped on the concrete with his skates in his frustration, damaging the blades.

During the 2006 European Allround Championships in Hamar, Kramer reached fourth place after a tournament full of incidents. The ice began to melt on the first day, and the skaters had to wait until later in the evening to continue skating.

During the 2006 World Allround Championships in Calgary, Kramer set a new world record in the 10,000 meter event with a time of 12:51.60. Kramer won both the two longest distances of the tournament, but had to settle for bronze overall.

=== Season 2006–2007 ===
In the 2006–2007 season, Kramer won the first two 5000 m World Cup races, the second in 6:09.78, just outside his world record time. In December 2006, he again became national allround champion, where a personal record in the 500 meter event, his weakest distance, gave him great prospects for the international allround championships.

On 14 January 2007, Kramer was crowned European Allround Champion in Collalbo, Italy. There had been a tight battle between Kramer and the 2006 winner Enrico Fabris. Fabris won the two shorter and Kramer the two longer distances, but his overall score was lower than Fabris' (148.800 to 149.389). In addition, his times in the 5 and 10 km were new world records for outdoor skating. By skating a new personal best in the 1500 m, Kramer overtook fellow Dutchman Jochem Uytdehaage and Enrico Fabris on the Adelskalender. On the Adelskalender, he was ranked first as of 17 November 2007.

On 11 February 2007, Kramer became World Allround Champion for the first time. He skated the 500 m and the 10 km in personal bests, the latter in a new world record of 12:49.88.

At the World Championships of 2007 in Salt Lake City, Kramer participated in the 5000, 10,000 meters, and the team pursuit. He won three out of three, the 10,000 m and the team pursuit in world records.

Kramer became Skater of the year. The female skater of the year was Ireen Wüst.

=== Season 2007–2008 ===
In the first season competition, Fabris beat Kramer in the 5000 meter, where he set a new world record, 6:07.40. A week later, Kramer got his world record back with a time of 6:03.32.

In Kolomna, Russia, Kramer won the European Allround Championship for the second time.

On 10 February, Kramer became World Allround Champion in Berlin, Germany, for the second time.

During the Essent ISU World Cup in Hamar (Norway), Kramer was awarded the Oscar Mathisen Award mainly due to the four world records he skated during 2007. Kramer skated four distances: 1500, 5000, 10,000 meters, and the team pursuit. In the 1500 meter event, Kramer skated a good race and placed second, ahead of Olympic Champion Enrico Fabris and Shani Davis. Denny Morrison from Canada won the race. Kramer won three gold medals in the 5000 and 10,000 m distances and the team pursuit, just like the year before.

Kramer became Skater of the year for the second time in a row. The female skater of the year was Paulien van Deutekom.

=== Season 2008–2009 ===
At the national single distance championships in Heerenveen, Kramer won the 1500, 5000, and the 10,000 meters; by winning these three distances, he brought his national titles total up to 11.

He won gold at the national allround championships in Heerenveen and at the European allround championships in Heerenveen. At the world single distance championships in Vancouver, Kramer won gold in the 5000, 10,000 meters, and the team pursuit.

Kramer won gold at the world allround championships in Hamar.

For the third time, he was chosen as "skater of the year" in the Netherlands and received the Ard Schenk Award.

=== Season 2009–2010 ===
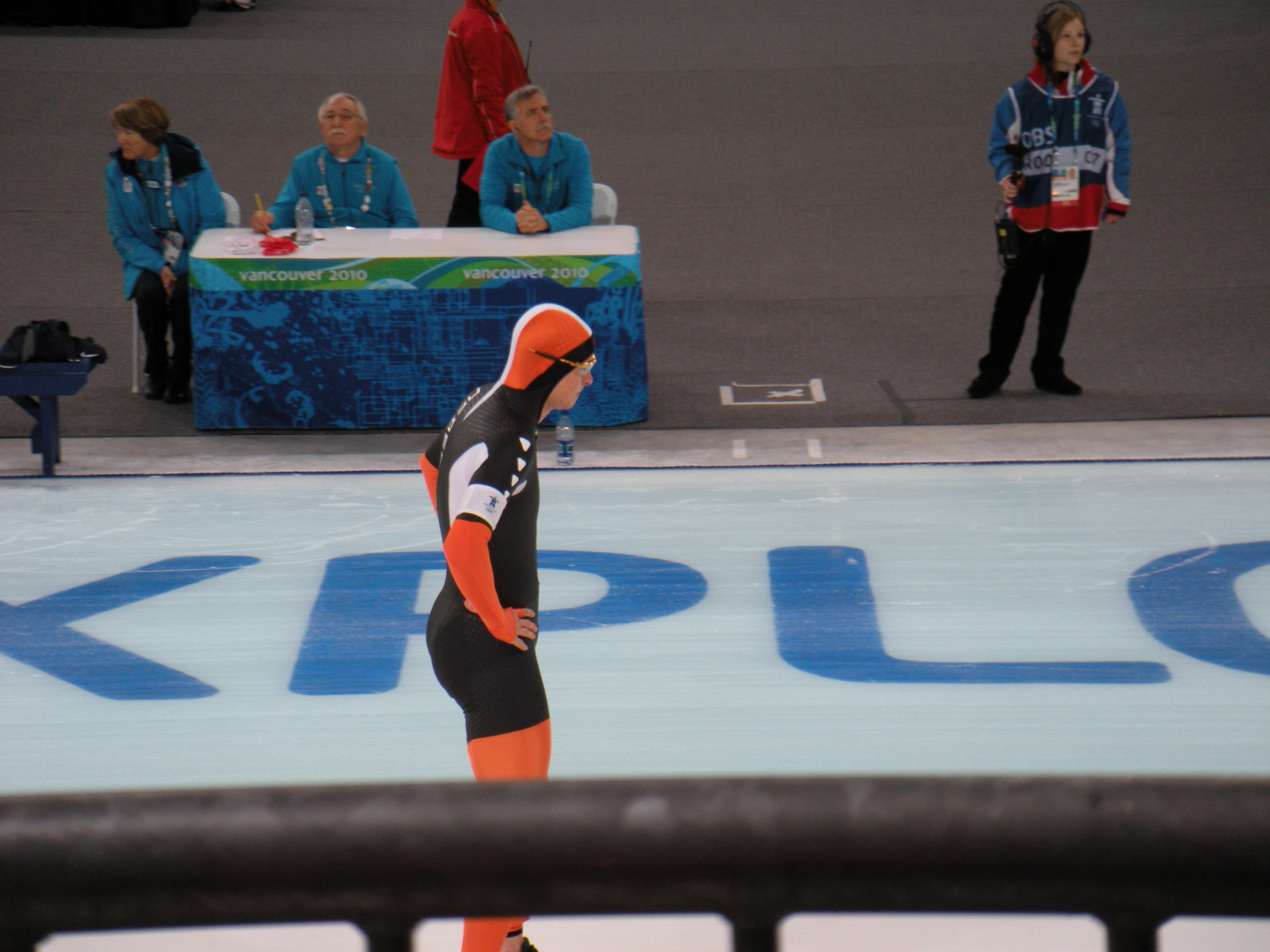
Sven Kramer at the 2010 Winter Olympics in Vancouver

At the national championships for single distances in Heerenveen, Kramer won the 5000 and the 10,000 meters. He failed to qualify for the World Cup for the 1500 meters.

Kramer won gold at the European allround championships in Hamar in January 2010. He became the allround European champion for the fourth year in a row. He won the final 10,000 meter race from the Italian Enrico Fabris, who ended second in the overall rankings. Russian Ivan Skobrev finished third.

At the 2010 Winter Olympics, Kramer was the favourite to win three gold medals, like his countryman Ard Schenk at the 1972 Olympics in Sapporo. At the 5000 meters race of the 2010 Winter Olympics in Vancouver, Kramer grabbed the gold medal with a new Olympic record of 6:14.60, beating the previous time of Jochem Uytdehaage by 0.06 seconds. He finished ahead of South Korean Lee Seung-hoon and Russian Ivan Skobrev, leaving four Olympic champions, Shani Davis, Enrico Fabris, Chad Hedrick and Bob de Jong, empty-handed.

Shortly after his 5000-meter victory, an NBC-affiliated reporter asked Kramer to say his name, country, and what he'd just won, to which Kramer replied, "Are you stupid? Hell no, I'm not gonna do that."

In the 10,000 meter event, Kramer finished first, with a time of 12:54.50, only to be disqualified for incorrectly changing lanes during one of the later laps. As a result, Lee Seung-hoon won gold with a new Olympic record, 12:58.55. The lane change mistake was caused by incorrect directions shouted to Kramer by his coach, Gerard Kemkers, near the end of the race.

Kramer didn't participate at the Dutch national championships since he needed rest after the Olympic games in Vancouver and to recover for the World Allround Championships in Heerenveen on 19–21 March.

At the World allround championships in Heerenveen on 19–21 March 2010, Kramer won an unprecedented fourth consecutive title. In the general classification after three distances, he ranked number 2, but in the final 10K race he skated 12:57.97 which was more than enough to pass Jonathan Kuck who was leading the overall classification before the start. Kuck ended number 2, Håvard Bøkko third. It was Kramer's 8th consecutive championship title in the European and World allround championships, another unprecedented feat.

Kramer became Skater of the year for the fourth time in a row. The female skater of the year was Ireen Wüst.

=== Season 2010–2011 ===
Kramer did not participate in this season because of an injury to one of the nerves (neuropathy) in his leg.

=== Season 2011–2012 ===
In the 2011–2012 season, Kramer returned to professional speed skating. He completed the European allround championships in Budapest in first place, claiming his fifth European allround championship.

At the world allround championships in Moscow, he also finished in first place, claiming his fifth championship. This tied the record shared by Oscar Mathisen, who won his 5th title in 1914, and Clas Thunberg, who won his 5th title in 1931.

=== Season 2012–2013 ===
Kramer won the European allround championships in Heerenveen in January for a record sixth time, tying the record of Rintje Ritsma.

Kramer also won the World Allround Championships in Hamar in February for a record sixth time.

=== Season 2013–2014 ===
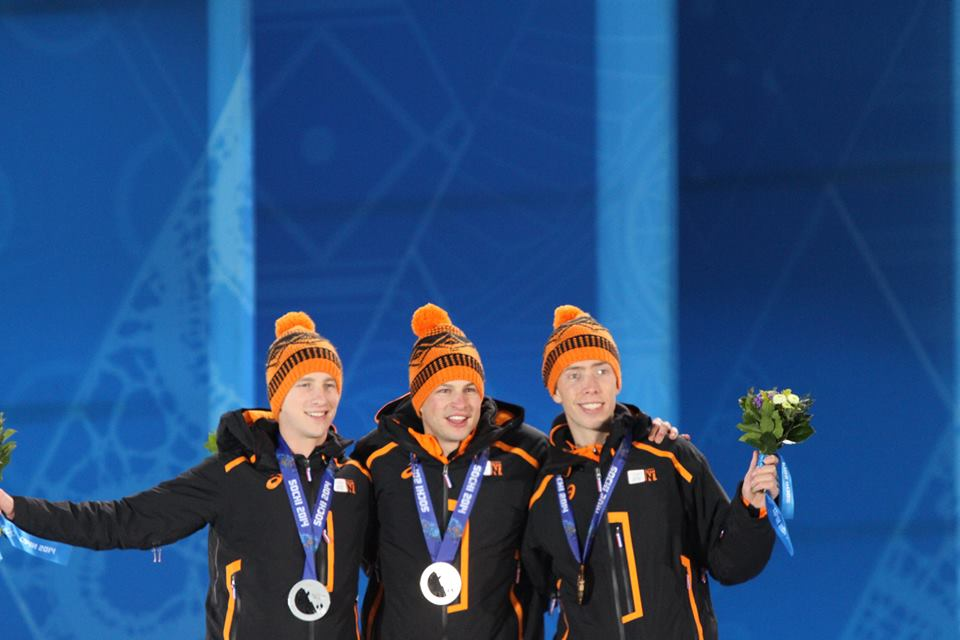
Sven Kramer (center) won gold at the 5000 m in Sochi.

In preparation for the Winter Olympics, Kramer chose not to compete in the European allround championships.

At the 2014 Winter Olympics, Kramer won gold at the 5000 m with an Olympic record of 6:10.76. Kramer also won silver in the 10,000 m. He withdrew from the 1500 m.

=== Season 2014–2015 ===
At the 2015 European allround championships in Chelyabinsk, Kramer won his 7th title.

=== Season 2015–2016 ===
At the 2016 European allround championships in Minsk, Kramer won a record 8th title.

=== Season 2017–2018 ===
At the 2018 Winter Olympics in Pyeongchang, South Korea, Kramer won the gold medal in the 5000 meter event, breaking his own Olympic record from 2014 with a time of 6:09.76. This was his third gold medal in a row in this event, and he became the only male speed skater to win the same Olympic event three times. He also became the first man to win eight Olympic medals in speed skating. In the 10,000 m event he finished sixth. In the following World championship allround he placed fourth overall.

== Records ==
=== Personal records ===
Personal records
Speed skating
Event	Result	Date	Location	Notes
500 meter	36.17	27 December 2009	Heerenveen	
1000 meter	1:09.77	28 February 2015	Calgary	
1500 meter	1:43.54	11 December 2009	Salt Lake City	
3000 meter	3:37.39	20 December 2019	Heerenveen	
5000 meter	6:03.32	17 November 2007	Calgary	
10000 meter	12:38.89	11 February 2017	Gangneung	
Team pursuit	3:34.68	15 February 2020	Salt Lake City	Former world record (with Douwe de Vries and Marcel Bosker)

He is currently in 4rd position in the adelskalender.

== World records ==
Event	Result	Date	Location	Notes
5000 meter	6:08.78	19 November 2005	Salt Lake City	
10000 meter	12:51.61	19 March 2006	Calgary	
10000 meter	12:49.88	11 February 2007	Heerenveen	
5000 meter	6:07.48	3 March 2007	Calgary	
10000 meter	12:41.69	10 March 2007	Salt Lake City	
Team pursuit	3:37.80	11 March 2007	Salt Lake City	Together with Carl Verheijen and Erben Wennemars
5000 meter	6:03.32	17 November 2007	Calgary	
Team pursuit	3:37.17	9 November 2013	Calgary	Together with Koen Verweij and Jan Blokhuijsen
Team pursuit	3:35.60	16 November 2013	Salt Lake City	Together with Koen Verweij and Jan Blokhuijsen
Team pursuit	3:34.68	15 February 2020	Salt Lake City	Together with Douwe de Vries and Marcel Bosker

== Olympic records ==
Event	Result	Date	Location
5000 meter	6:09.76	11 February 2018	Gangneung, Pyeongchang
Team pursuit	3:37.71	22 February 2014	Sochi

Source:Vancouver 2010

== Tournament overview ==
Season	Dutch Championships Single Distances	Dutch Championships Allround	European Championships Allround	World Championships Allround	World Championships Single Distances	Olympic Games	World Cup GWC	World Championships Junior Allround	European Championships Single Distances
2003–04								ROSEVILLE 13th 500m (silver) 3000m 11th 1500m 4th 5000m (silver) overall DNF Team pursuit	
2004–05	ASSEN 16th 1500m 4th 5000m	HEERENVEEN 4th 500m (bronze) 5000m 4th 1500m (silver) 10000m (gold) overall	HEERENVEEN 10th 500m (bronze) 5000m 4th 1500m (silver) 10000m (silver) overall	MOSCOW 7th 500m 6th 5000m 6th 1500m (bronze) 10000m (bronze) overall			12th 5000/10000 km	SEINÄJOKI 6th 500m (gold) 3000m (gold) 1500m (gold) 5000m (gold) overall (gold) Team pursuit	
2005–06	HEERENVEEN (bronze) 1500m (silver) 5000m (silver) 10000m		HAMAR 18th 500m (silver) 5000m 8th 1500m (silver) 10000m 4th overall	CALGARY 14th 500m (gold) 5000m 13th 1500m (gold) 10000m (bronze) overall		TURIN 15th 1500m (silver) 5000m 7th 10000m (bronze) Team pursuit	(silver) 5000/10000m (bronze) Team pursuit		
2006–07	HEERENVEEN (gold) 1500m (gold) 5000m (gold) 10000m	HEERENVEEN 4th 500m (gold) 5000m (silver) 1500m (silver) 10000m (gold) overall	COLLALBO 5th 500m (gold) 5000m (silver) 1500m (gold) 10000m (gold) overall	HEERENVEEN 5th 500m (gold) 5000m 6th 1500m (gold) 10000m (gold) overall	SALT LAKE CITY (gold) 5000m (gold) 10000m (gold) Team pursuit		22nd 1500m (gold) 5000/10000m (gold) Team pursuit		
2007–08	HEERENVEEN (bronze) 1500m (gold) 5000m (gold) 10000m	GRONINGEN (gold) 500m (gold) 5000m (gold) 1500m (gold) 10000m (gold) overall	KOLOMNO (gold) 500m (gold) 5000m (bronze) 1500m (gold) 10000m (gold) overall	BERLIN (bronze) 500m (gold) 5000m 4th 1500m (gold) 10000m (gold) overall	NAGANO (silver) 1500m (gold) 5000m (gold) 10000m (gold) Team pursuit		7th 1500m (silver) 5000/10000m (gold) Team pursuit		
2008–09	HEERENVEEN (gold) 1500m (gold) 5000m (gold) 10000m	HEERENVEEN (bronze) 500m (gold) 5000m (gold) 1500m (gold) 10000m (gold) overall	HEERENVEEN 5th 500m (gold) 5000m (gold) 1500m (gold) 10000m (gold) overall	HAMAR 6th 500m (gold) 5000m (silver) 1500m (gold) 10000m (gold) overall	RICHMOND 8th 1500m (gold) 5000m (gold) 10000m (gold) Team pursuit		8th 1500m (gold) 5000/10000m 7th Team pursuit		
2009–10	HEERENVEEN 10th 1500m (gold) 5000m (gold) 10000m		HAMAR 4th 500m (gold) 5000m (silver) 1500m (gold) 10000m (gold) overall	HEERENVEEN 6th 500m (gold) 5000m 4th 1500m (gold) 10000m (gold) overall		VANCOUVER 13th 1500m (gold) 5000m DQ 10000m (bronze) Team pursuit	27th 1500m 4th 5000/10000m (silver) Team pursuit		
2010–11									
2011–12	HEERENVEEN (bronze) 5000m (bronze) 10000m		BUDAPEST 12th 500m (gold) 5000m (gold) 1500m (gold) 10000m (gold) overall	MOSCOW 8th 500m (gold) 5000m 4th 1500m (gold) 10000m (gold) overall	HEERENVEEN (gold) 5000m (gold) Team pursuit		32nd 1500m (silver) 5000/10000m (gold) Team pursuit 10th Grand World Cup		
2012–13	HEERENVEEN (gold) 5000m	HEERENVEEN 5th 500m (gold) 5000m (gold) 1500m (silver) 10000m (gold) overall	HEERENVEEN 7th 500m (gold) 5000m 8th 1500m (gold) 10000m (gold) overall	HAMAR 9th 500m (gold) 5000m 4th 1500m (gold) 10000m (gold) overall	SOCHI (gold) 5000m (silver) 10000m (gold) Team pursuit		(bronze) 5000/10000m (gold) Team pursuit 7th Grand World Cup		
2013–14	HEERENVEEN (gold) 5000m (gold) 10000m	AMSTERDAM 4th 500m DQ 5000m DNS 1500m DNS 10000m DNQ overall				SOCHI WDR 1500m (gold) 5000m (silver) 10000m (gold) Team pursuit	(bronze) 5000/10000m (gold) Team pursuit 12th Grand World Cup		
2014–15	HEERENVEEN (gold) 1500m (gold) 5000m 9th 10000m	HEERENVEEN 4th 500m (silver) 5000m (bronze) 1500m (silver) 10000m (gold) overall	CHELYABINSK 10th 500m (gold) 5000m 5th 1500m (gold) 10000m (gold) overall	CALGARY 10th 500m (gold) 5000m (bronze) 1500m (gold) 10000m (gold) overall	HEERENVEEN (gold) 5000m (gold) Team pursuit		14th 1500m 9th 5000/10000m (silver) Team pursuit 19th Grand World Cup		
2015–16	HEERENVEEN 8th 1500m (gold) 5000m (gold) 10000m		MINSK 4th 500m (gold) 5000m 5th 1500m (gold) 10000m (gold) overall	BERLIN 9th 500m (gold) 5000m (bronze) 1500m (gold) 10000m (gold) overall	KOLOMNO (gold) 5000m (gold) 10000m		43rd 1500m (gold) 5000/10000m (gold) Team pursuit 8th Grand World Cup		
2016–17	HEERENVEEN (gold) 1500m (gold) 5000m (silver) 10000m		HEERENVEEN 8th 500m (gold) 5000m (silver) 1500m (gold) 10000m (gold) overall	HAMAR 8th 500m (gold) 5000m (silver) 1500m (gold) 10000m (gold) overall	GANGNEUNG (bronze) 1500m (gold) 5000m (gold) 10000m		13th 1500m 9th 5000/10000m (gold) Team pursuit 15th Grand World Cup		
2017–18	HEERENVEEN (bronze) 1500m (gold) 5000m (silver) 10000m			AMSTERDAM 6th 500m (silver) 5000m 5th 1500m 6th 10000m 4th overall		GANGNEUNG (gold) 5000m 6th 10000m (bronze) Team pursuit 16th Mass start	(bronze) 5000/10000m 7th Team pursuit 10th Grand World Cup		
2018–19	HEERENVEEN 4th 1500m (bronze) 5000m		COLLALBO 6th 500m (gold) 5000m (gold) 1500m (silver) 10000m (gold) overall	CALGARY 9th 500m (silver) 5000m (bronze) 1500m 4th 10000m (bronze) overall	INZELL (bronze) 5000m (gold) Team pursuit		48th 1500m 33rd 5000/10000m		
2019–20	HEERENVEEN 7th 1500m (silver) 5000m			HAMAR 19th 500m 9th 5000m WDR 1500m WDR 10000m NC overall	SALT LAKE CITY (silver) 5000m (gold) Team pursuit		39th 5000/10000m		HEERENVEEN (silver) 5000m (gold) Team pursuit
2020–21	HEERENVEEN 6th 1500m (silver) 5000m 6th 10000m				HEERENVEEN 19th 5000m		(silver) 5000/10000m (silver) Team pursuit		
2021–22	HEERENVEEN 5th 5000m					BEIJING 9th 5000m 4th Team pursuit 16th Mass start	41st 5000m/10000m 4th Team pursuit		HEERENVEEN 6th 5000m (gold) Team pursuit

- DNF = Did not finish
- DQ = Disqualified
- WDR = Withdrew
- NC = No classification

== World Cup overview ==
Season	1500 meter						
2004–2005							
2005–2006							
2006–2007	6th	7th	–	–	–	–	
2007–2008	6th	20th	–	1st place, gold medalist(s)	2nd place, silver medalist(s)	–	4th
2008–2009	1st place, gold medalist(s)	11th	–	4th	6th	–	
2009–2010	–	–	–	–	9th	–	
2010–2011							
2011–2012	–	–	–	2nd(b)	–	–	
2012–2013							
2013–2014							
2014–2015	8th	7th	–	7th	–	–	
2015–2016	19th	–	–	–	–	–	
2016–2017	1st place, gold medalist(s)	6th	–	–	–	–	
2017–2018	–	–	–	–			
2018–2019	4th(b)	–	–	–	–		
2019–2020							
2020–2021							
2021–2022							

Season	5000/10000 meter						
2004–2005	6th	9th	–*	5th	–	–*	
2005–2006	5th	1st place, gold medalist(s)	5th*	5th	1st place, gold medalist(s)	–	1st place, gold medalist(s)
2006–2007	1st place, gold medalist(s)	1st place, gold medalist(s)	–*	1st place, gold medalist(s)	(gold) *	1st place, gold medalist(s)	
2007–2008	2nd place, silver medalist(s)	1st place, gold medalist(s)	–*	1st place, gold medalist(s)	–*	–	1st place, gold medalist(s)
2008–2009	1st place, gold medalist(s)	1st place, gold medalist(s)	–*	1st place, gold medalist(s)	(gold) *	1st place, gold medalist(s)	
2009–2010	1st place, gold medalist(s)	1st place, gold medalist(s)	(gold) *	1st place, gold medalist(s)	–	–	
2010–2011							
2011–2012	2nd place, silver medalist(s)	1st place, gold medalist(s)	9th*	2nd place, silver medalist(s)	–*	1st place, gold medalist(s)	
2012–2013	1st place, gold medalist(s)	1st place, gold medalist(s)	–*	1st place, gold medalist(s)	–*		
2013–2014	1st place, gold medalist(s)	1st place, gold medalist(s)	(gold) *	–	–	–	
2014–2015	1st place, gold medalist(s)	–*	–	1st place, gold medalist(s)	–	–	
2015–2016	1st place, gold medalist(s)	(silver) *	–	1st place, gold medalist(s)	1st place, gold medalist(s)	1st place, gold medalist(s)	
2016–2017	1st place, gold medalist(s)	1st place, gold medalist(s)	–	–*	–	–	
2017–2018	1st place, gold medalist(s)	(gold) *	1st place, gold medalist(s)	–			
2018–2019	–	–	–*	3rd place, bronze medalist(s)	–		
2019–2020	13th	–	–	–	DQ	–	
2020–2021	2nd place, silver medalist(s)	3rd place, bronze medalist(s)					
2021–2022	9th(b)	–	–	–	–		

Season	Team Pursuit				
2004–2005					
2005–2006	–	1st place, gold medalist(s)	–		
2006–2007	1st place, gold medalist(s)	–	1st place, gold medalist(s)		
2007–2008	–	1st place, gold medalist(s)	–	1st place, gold medalist(s)	
2008–2009	–	1st place, gold medalist(s)	–		
2009–2010	1st place, gold medalist(s)	–	–		
2010–2011					
2011–2012	1st place, gold medalist(s)	1st place, gold medalist(s)	–	–	
2012–2013	1st place, gold medalist(s)	–	1st place, gold medalist(s)	1st place, gold medalist(s)	
2013–2014	1st place, gold medalist(s)	1st place, gold medalist(s)	–	–	
2014–2015	1st place, gold medalist(s)	–	–		
2015–2016	–	–	1st place, gold medalist(s)	–	
2016–2017	1st place, gold medalist(s)	1st place, gold medalist(s)	–	–	–
2017–2018	–	1st place, gold medalist(s)	–		
2018–2019	–	–	–	–	
2019–2020					
2020–2021	1st place, gold medalist(s)	4th			
2021–2022	1st place, gold medalist(s)	–	–		

- – = did not participate
- * = 10000m
- (b) = Division B

== Medals won ==
Championship	Gold (gold)	Silver (silver)	Bronze (bronze)
Olympic Games	4	2	3
Dutch Single Distances	20	6	6
Dutch Allround	16	6	3
European Allround	33	8	2
European Single Distances	2	1	0
World Allround	29	4	8
World Single Distances	21	3	2
World Cup	73	13	6
World Junior	5	2	0

== See also ==
- List of multiple Olympic gold medalists

Records
Preceded by (United States) Chad Hedrick (Italy) Enrico Fabris	Men's 5000 m speed skating world record 19 November 2005 – 10 November 2007; 17 November 2007 – 10 December 2017	Succeeded by (Italy) Enrico Fabris (Canada) Ted-Jan Bloemen
Preceded by (United States) Chad Hedrick	Men's 10,000 m speed skating world record 19 March 2006 – 21 November 2015	Succeeded by (Canada) Ted-Jan Bloemen
Preceded by (Canada) Arne Dankers, Steven Elm, Denny Morrison	Men's team pursuit speed skating world record 11 March 2007 – 5 December 2021; With: Carl Verheijen, Erben Wennemars (2007–2013); Jan Blokhuijsen, Koen Verweij (2013–2020); Marcel Bosker, Douwe de Vries (2020–2021)	Succeeded by (United States) Joey Mantia, Emery Lehman, Casey Dawson
