= Øystein Grødum =

Norwegian speed skater

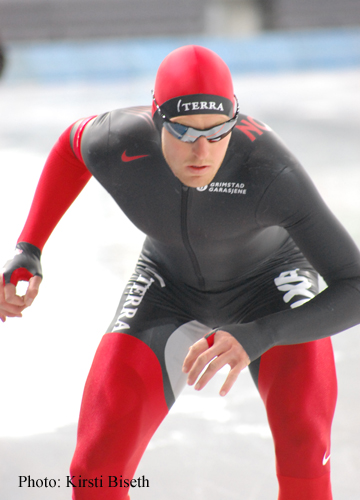
- National single distances Championship, Hamar November 2nd 2008

Personal information
- Born: 15 February 1977 (age 49)

Sport
- Country: Norway
- Sport: Speed skating

Øystein Grødum (born 15 February 1977) is a Norwegian speedskater, who is a member of Arendal SK. Grødum competed in the 2006 Winter Olympics for Norway, with fourth place on 10,000 metres as his best place, and won the World Cup on long distances in 2004–05. However, he is yet to win an overall championship medal, though he won two distance golds in the 2005 World Allround Championship and a distance gold at the European Championship the same year.

== Personal bests ==
As of December 2006, these are

500 m	39.10
1000 m	1:14.42
1500 m	1:48.52
3000 m	3:41.02
5000 m	6:15.50
10,000 m	12:56.38
