= Eskil Ervik =

Norwegian speed skater

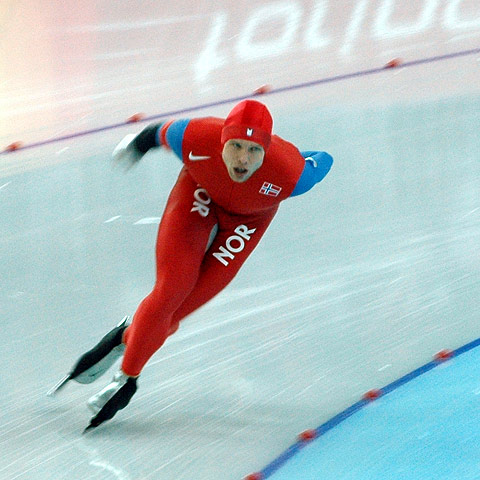
- Eskil Ervik at the 2006 Winter Olympics

Personal information
- Born: 11 January 1975 (age 51) Trondheim, Norway

Sport
- Country: Norway
- Sport: Men's speed skating
- Club: Sportsklubben Falken, Hamar Idrettslag
Medal record
Representing Norway
Men's speed skating
World Championships
Bronze medal – third place	1999 Hamar	Allround
Bronze medal – third place	2005 Inzell	Team pursuit
European Championships
Silver medal – second place	2000 Hamar	Allround
Silver medal – second place	2006 Hamar	Allround

Eskil Ervik (born 11 January 1975) is a Norwegian speedskater. Ervik's best distance is traditionally the 5000-m, where he for several years was among the very best of the world, but his top priority for the most part of his career was to perform optimally in the allround championships. His retirement from top international speedskating was announced in April 2007.

== Career history ==
Ervik won bronze at the World Allround Championships in Hamar in 1999 and silver at the European Allround Championships in 2000 and 2006, again in Hamar. As of January 2007, he has won the Norwegian allround championships seven times (2000, 2001, 2002, 2003, 2004, 2006, 2007), and has also won a string of Norwegian single distance championships titles.

Under American coach Peter Mueller, Ervik enjoyed a new spring as a speed skater – on 15 October 2005, he set a new world outdoor record on the 3000 meters, finishing at 3:44.90 in Inzell, and on 5 November 2005, he set the world record (indoor or outdoor) on that distance in Calgary with a time of 3:37.28. Eight days later in Calgary, he broke the world record on the 5000 meters, finishing in 6:12.19, on that occasion also being the first skater ever to do the 5000 meters with all lap times below 30 seconds. This was a short-lived world record, though, since Chad Hedrick skated faster in the next race.

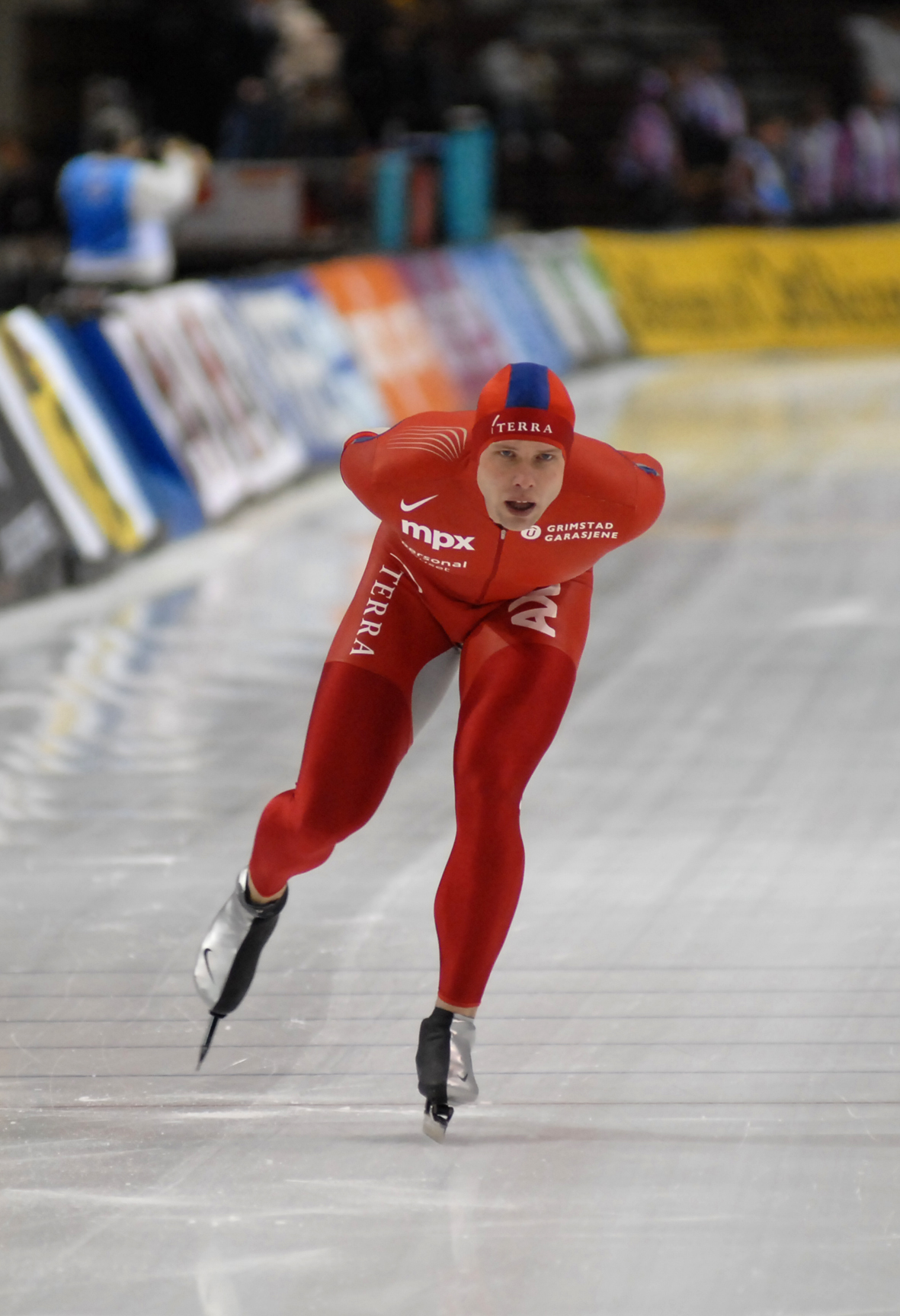
Eskil Ervik

Ervik's highest ranking on the all-time best-ever Adelskalender list was a 4th place, a position he held briefly on 4 December 2005, when he became the second skater ever to race a 10,000-m below 13 minutes (but 12.52 seconds later Enrico Fabris overtook his 4th rank position). Ervik was for several years the best Norwegian on the Adelskalender, until Håvard Bøkko passed him in March 2007. At the time of his retirement from speedskating, Ervik held the 8th position at the Adelskalender.

In the "Top Gear Winter Olympics Special" Jeremy Clarkson raced with a Jaguar XK8 against Ervik in a 1500m (three lap) race around a speed-skating track. Due to the car's traction and handling being reduced to virtually zero while on the ice, Ervik managed to finish the race with a two lap lead.

Ervik currently works as head of the marketing department at the Storhamar Dragons front office.

== Record ==
=== Personal record ===
Personal records
Men's speedskating
Event	Result	Date	Location	Notes
500 m	37.03	18 March 2006	Calgary	
1000 m	1:13.41	31 December 2006	Davos	
1500 m	1:45.73	19 March 2006	Calgary	
3000 m	3:37.28	5 November 2005	Calgary	World record
5000 m	6:10.65	19 November 2005	Salt Lake City	WR (beaten later)
10000 m	12:59.69	4 December 2005	Heerenveen	

Source: SpeedskatingResults.com

=== World record ===
Event	Time	Date	Venue
3000 m	3.37,28	November 5, 2005	Calgary

Source: SpeedSkatingStats.com
