= 2013–14 ISU Speed Skating World Cup – Men's 1500 metres =

The 1500 meters distance for men in the 2013–14 ISU Speed Skating World Cup was contested over six races on six occasions, out of a total of six World Cup occasions for the season, with the first occasion taking place in Calgary, Alberta, Canada, on 8–10 November 2013, and the final occasion taking place in Heerenveen, Netherlands, on 14–16 March 2014.

Koen Verweij of the Netherlands won the cup, while Denis Yuskov of Russia came second, and Shani Davis of the United States came third. The defending champion, Zbigniew Bródka of Poland, had to settle for fourth place.

== Top three ==
Position	Athlete	Points	Previous season
1	(Netherlands) Koen Verweij	440	9th
2	(Russia) Denis Yuskov	430	4th
3	(United States) Shani Davis	401	5th

== Race medallists ==
Occasion #	Location	Date	Gold	Time	Silver	Time	Bronze	Time	Report
1	Calgary, Alberta, Canada	8 November	Koen Verweij; Netherlands	1:42.78	Shani Davis; United States	1:43.11	Kjeld Nuis; Netherlands	1:43.75	
2	Salt Lake City, United States	15 November	Shani Davis; United States	1:41.98	Brian Hansen; United States	1:42.16	Koen Verweij; Netherlands	1:42.28	
3	Astana, Kazakhstan	29 November	Denis Yuskov; Russia	1:45.06	Koen Verweij; Netherlands	1:45.23	Zbigniew Bródka; Poland	1:45.78	
4	Berlin, Germany	6 December	Joey Mantia; United States	1:45.80	Zbigniew Bródka; Poland	1:45.83	Denis Yuskov; Russia	1:46.14	
5	Inzell, Germany	9 March	Brian Hansen; United States	1:44.58	Denny Morrison; Canada	1:45.28	Koen Verweij; Netherlands	1:45.68	
6	Heerenveen, Netherlands	15 March	Denis Yuskov; Russia	1:45.55	Koen Verweij; Netherlands	1:45.60	Zbigniew Bródka; Poland	1:45.81	

== Standings ==
Standings as of 15 March 2014 (end of the season).

#	Name	Nat.	CAL	SLC	AST	BER	INZ	HVN	Total
1	Koen Verweij	(Netherlands)	100	70	80		70	120	440
2	Denis Yuskov	(Russia)	14	60	100	70	36	150	430
3	Shani Davis	(United States)	80	100	50	36	60	75	401
4	Zbigniew Bródka	(Poland)	36	45	70	80	50	105	386
5	Brian Hansen	(United States)	25	80			100	40	245
6	Sverre Lunde Pedersen	(Norway)	45	28	60	60		21	214
7	Denny Morrison	(Canada)	24	50	24		80	32	210
8	Mark Tuitert	(Netherlands)	28			28	40	90	186
9	Konrad Niedźwiedzki	(Poland)	40	32	28	40	28	18	186
10	Kjeld Nuis	(Netherlands)	70	40			45	28	183
11	Håvard Bøkko	(Norway)	21	24	32	32	21	45	175
12	Rhian Ket	(Netherlands)	32	14	45	45	32	6	174
13	Denis Kuzin	(Kazakhstan)	15	21	40	50	16		142
14	Joey Mantia	(United States)	6		25	100			131
15	Alexis Contin	(France)	50	16	36	5			107
16	Trevor Marsicano	(United States)	19	36	21	24			100
17	Bart Swings	(Belgium)		6	15	21	14	36	92
18	Ivan Skobrev	(Russia)	60	8		18			86
19	Jan Szymański	(Poland)	16			25	18	16	75
20	Håvard Holmefjord Lorentzen	(Norway)	8	12	16	14	12	10	72
21	Haralds Silovs	(Latvia)	8	25	18	12		8	71
22	Stefan Groothuis	(Netherlands)			19		24	24	67
23	Aleksey Yesin	(Russia)	18	10	12			14	54
24	Yevgeny Lalenkov	(Russia)	11		14	16			41
25	Benjamin Macé	(France)	12	18	10				40
26	Mirko Giacomo Nenzi	(Italy)	1				25	12	38
27	Jonathan Kuck	(United States)	4	19	6	6			35
28	Lucas Makowski	(Canada)	10	6	10	8			34
29	Aleksey Suvorov	(Russia)		15	8		8		31
30	Sergey Gryaztsov	(Russia)		2	2	4	15		23
31	Wouter olde Heuvel	(Netherlands)		11		11			22
32	Jan Blokhuijsen	(Netherlands)				19			19
32	Konrád Nagy	(Hungary)					19		19
34	Bram Smallenbroek	(Austria)				8	10		18
35	Patrick Beckert	(Germany)		8			8		16
36	Thomas Krol	(Netherlands)				15			15
37	Piotr Puszkarski	(Poland)					11		11
37	Pim Schipper	(Netherlands)			11				11
39	Mathieu Giroux	(Canada)	2	1		6			9
40	Douwe de Vries	(Netherlands)			8				8
41	Joo Hyong-jun	(South Korea)			6	1			7
42	Dmitry Babenko	(Kazakhstan)	6						6
42	Mikhail Kozlov	(Russia)					6		6
44	Richard Maclennan	(Canada)		4					4
44	Shota Nakamura	(Japan)					4		4
44	Tian Guojun	(South Korea)			4				4
47	Moritz Geisreiter	(Germany)				2			2
47	Fredrik van der Horst	(Norway)					2		2
49	Hubert Hirschbichler	(Germany)					1		1
49	Sergey Mezentsev	(Kazakhstan)			1				1
