= 2013–14 ISU Speed Skating World Cup – World Cup 2 – Men's 1500 metres =

The men's 1500 metres race of the 2013–14 ISU Speed Skating World Cup 2, arranged in the Utah Olympic Oval, in Salt Lake City, United States, was held on November 15, 2013.

Shani Davis of the United States won the race, while Brian Hansen, also of the United States, came second, and Koen Verweij of the Netherlands came third. Haralds Silovs of Latvia won the Division B race.

== Results ==
The race took place on Friday, November 15, with Division B scheduled in the morning session, at 10:10, and Division A scheduled in the afternoon session, at 16:20.

=== Division A ===
Rank	Name	Nat.	Pair	Lane	Time	WC points	GWC points
1st place, gold medalist(s)	Shani Davis	(United States)	10	o	1:41.98	100	10
2nd place, silver medalist(s)	Brian Hansen	(United States)	5	i	1:42.16	80	8
3rd place, bronze medalist(s)	Koen Verweij	(Netherlands)	10	i	1:42.28	70	7
4	Denis Yuskov	(Russia)	2	i	1:42.36	60	6
5	Denny Morrison	(Canada)	5	o	1:42.79	50	5
6	Zbigniew Bródka	(Poland)	7	o	1:42.89	45	—
7	Kjeld Nuis	(Netherlands)	9	i	1:42.92	40	
8	Trevor Marsicano	(United States)	4	o	1:43.02	36	
9	Konrad Niedźwiedzki	(Poland)	7	i	1:43.12	32	
10	Sverre Lunde Pedersen	(Norway)	8	o	1:43.25	28	
11	Håvard Bøkko	(Norway)	4	i	1:43.600	24	
12	Denis Kuzin	(Kazakhstan)	3	o	1:43.608	21	
13	Benjamin Macé	(France)	2	o	1:43.70	18	
14	Alexis Contin	(France)	8	i	1:44.00	16	
15	Rhian Ket	(Netherlands)	6	i	1:44.06	14	
16	Håvard Holmefjord Lorentzen	(Netherlands)	1	o	1:44.45	12	
17	Aleksey Yesin	(Russia)	3	i	1:44.51	10	
18	Ivan Skobrev	(Russia)	9	o	1:45.14	8	
19	Lucas Makowsky	(Canada)	1	i	1:46.05	6	
20	Mark Tuitert	(Netherlands)	6	o	DQ		

=== Division B ===
Rank	Name	Nat.	Pair	Lane	Time	WC points
1	Haralds Silovs	(Latvia)	19	i	1:44.66	25
2	Jonathan Kuck	(United States)	18	o	1:44.67	19
3	Aleksey Suvorov	(Russia)	3	o	1:44.97	15
4	Wouter olde Heuvel	(Netherlands)	15	i	1:45.16	11
5	Patrick Beckert	(Germany)	4	i	1:45.18	8
6	Bart Swings	(Belgium)	5	o	1:45.23	6
7	Richard Maclennan	(Canada)	11	o	1:45.37	4
8	Sergey Gryaztsov	(Russia)	15	o	1:45.42	2
9	Mathieu Giroux	(Canada)	17	i	1:45.56	1
10	Joey Mantia	(United States)	18	i	1:45.62	—
11	Kim Cheol-min	(South Korea)	14	o	1:45.67	
12	Konrád Nagy	(Hungary)	11	i	1:45.69	
13	Taro Kondo	(Japan)	12	i	1:45.953	
14	Joo Hyong-jun	(South Korea)	16	i	1:45.955	
15	Bram Smallenbroek	(Austria)	17	o	1:45.958	
16	Fyodor Mezentsev	(Kazakhstan)	10	o	1:46.10	
17	Dmitry Babenko	(Russia)	19	o	1:46.26	
18	Robert Lehmann	(Germany)	3	i	1:46.33	
19	Matteo Anesi	(Italy)	10	i	1:46.47	
20	Shane Dobbin	(New Zealand)	4	o	1:46.48	
21	Vincent De Haître	(Canada)	13	i	1:46.61	
22	Simon Spieler Nilsen	(Norway)	12	o	1:46.65	
23	Christoffer Fagerli Rukke	(Norway)	9	o	1:46.76	
24	Aleksandr Zhigin	(Kazakhstan)	14	i	1:46.94	
25	Tian Guojun	(China)	9	i	1:46.99	
26	Jan Daldossi	(Italy)	7	o	1:47.23	
27	Ewen Fernandez	(France)	7	i	1:47.45	
28	Vitaly Mikhailov	(Belarus)	8	i	1:47.694	
29	Andrea Giovannini	(Italy)	2	o	1:47.696	
30	Maciej Biega	(Poland)	6	i	1:47.72	
31	Roland Cieslak	(Poland)	2	i	1:47.75	
32	Joel Vähä-Salo	(Finland)	8	o	1:48.60	
33	Darren Ta-Yuan Huang	(Chinese Taipei)	6	o	1:48.83	
34	David Andersson	(Sweden)	16	o	1:48.98	
35	Galbaatar Uuganbaatar	(Mongolia)	5	i	1:51.44	
36	Victor-Hald Thorup	(Denmark)	1	i	1:51.46	
37	Shota Nakamura	(Japan)	13	o	2:04.03	
