= 2013–14 ISU Speed Skating World Cup – World Cup 2 – Men's team pursuit =

The men's team pursuit race of the 2013–14 ISU Speed Skating World Cup 2, arranged in the Utah Olympic Oval, in Salt Lake City, United States, was held on November 16, 2013.

The Dutch team – comprised by Jan Blokhuijsen, Koen Verweij and Sven Kramer – won, setting a new world record, while the American team came second, and the South Korean team came third.

== Results ==
The race took place on Saturday, November 16, in the afternoon session, scheduled at 15:46.

Rank	Country	Skaters	Pair	Lane	Time	WC points
1st place, gold medalist(s)	Netherlands	Jan Blokhuijsen; Koen Verweij; Sven Kramer	7	i	3:35.60	100
2nd place, silver medalist(s)	United States	Brian Hansen; Jonathan Kuck; Shani Davis	7	o	3:37.22	80
3rd place, bronze medalist(s)	South Korea	Lee Seung-hoon; Kim Cheol-min; Joo Hyong-jun	6	i	3:37.51	70
4	Norway	Håvard Bøkko; Håvard Holmefjord Lorentzen; Sverre Lunde Pedersen	5	o	3:37.93	60
5	France	Benjamin Macé; Alexis Contin; Ewen Fernandez	3	i	3:39.41	50
6	Germany	Patrick Beckert; Robert Lehmann; Moritz Geisreiter	3	o	3:40.50	45
7	Canada	Denny Morrison; Lucas Makowsky; Mathieu Giroux	6	o	3:40.64	40
8	Russia	Ivan Skobrev; Denis Yuskov; Yevgeny Lalenkov	4	i	3:41.26	35
9	Italy	Andrea Giovannini; Matteo Anesi; Luca Stefani	4	o	3:42.14	30
10	Poland	Zbigniew Bródka; Konrad Niedźwiedzki; Roland Cieslak	5	i	3:43.49	25
11	Belgium	Bart Swings; Ferre Spruyt; Maarten Swings	2	o	3:45.64	21
12	New Zealand	Kalon Dobbin; Daniel Nation; Shane Dobbin	1	o	3:49.82	18
13	Kazakhstan	Aleksandr Zhigin; Denis Kuzin; Dmitry Babenko	1	i	3:52.73	16
14	Japan	Hiroki Abe; Shota Nakamura; Shane Williamson	2	i	DNF	—
