= 2012–13 ISU Speed Skating World Cup – Men's 1500 metres =

The 1500 meters distance for men in the 2012–13 ISU Speed Skating World Cup was contested over six races on six occasions, out of a total of nine World Cup occasions for the season, with the first occasion taking place in Heerenveen, Netherlands, on 16–18 November 2012, and the final occasion also taking place in Heerenveen on 8–10 March 2013.

Zbigniew Bródka of Poland won the cup, while Bart Swings of Belgium came second, and the defending champion, Håvard Bøkko of Norway, came third.

== Top three ==
Medal	Athlete	Points	Previous season
Gold	(Poland) Zbigniew Bródka	460	14th
Silver	(Belgium) Bart Swings	336	19th
Bronze	(Norway) Håvard Bøkko	329	1st

== Race medallists ==
Occasion #	Location	Date	Gold	Time	Silver	Time	Bronze	Time	Report
1	Heerenveen, Netherlands	18 November	Maurice Vriend; Netherlands	1:46.13	Håvard Bøkko; Norway	1:46.40	Sverre Lunde Pedersen; Norway	1:46.54	
2	Kolomna, Russia	25 November	Koen Verweij; Netherlands	1:45.56	Bart Swings; Belgium	1:45.77	Brian Hansen; United States	1:45.91	
3	Astana, Kazachstan	1 December	Shani Davis; United States	1:46.01	Håvard Bøkko; Norway	1:46.34	Zbigniew Bródka; Poland	1:46.42	
7	Inzell, Germany	10 February	Denis Yuskov; Russia	1:46.07	Zbigniew Bródka; Poland	1:46.09	Brian Hansen; United States	1:46.14	
8	Erfurt, Germany	3 March	Zbigniew Bródka; Poland	1:46.88	Haralds Silovs; Latvia	1:46.98	Brian Hansen; United States	1:47.01	
9	Heerenveen, Netherlands	10 March	Bart Swings; Belgium	1:45.50	Zbigniew Bródka; Poland	1:45.96	Shani Davis; United States	1:46.13	

== Standings ==
Standings as of 10 March 2013 (end of the season).

#	Name	Nat.	HVN1	KOL	AST	INZ	ERF	HVN2	Total
1	Zbigniew Bródka	(Poland)	50	40	70	80	100	120	460
2	Bart Swings	(Belgium)	24	80	32	32	18	150	336
3	Håvard Bøkko	(Norway)	80	50	80	24	50	45	329
4	Denis Yuskov	(Russia)	36	24	60	100	28	75	323
5	Shani Davis	(United States)	–	28	100	28	32	105	293
6	Brian Hansen	(United States)	45	70	–	70	70	36	291
7	Konrad Niedźwiedzki	(Poland)	60	60	24	50	45	28	267
8	Sverre Lunde Pedersen	(Norway)	70	32	40	40	60	21	263
9	Koen Verweij	(Netherlands)	28	100	21	60	21	18	248
10	Maurice Vriend	(Netherlands)	100	45	36	18	10	24	233
11	Kjeld Nuis	(Netherlands)	32	36	–	–	–	90	158
12	Ivan Skobrev	(Russia)	40	21	6	45	–	32	144
13	Haralds Silovs	(Latvia)	15	5	–	25	80	10	135
14	Jan Szymański	(Poland)	25	16	28	5	40	16	130
15	Mark Tuitert	(Netherlands)	–	–	–	36	36	40	112
16	Alexis Contin	(France)	21	18	50	–	16	6	111
17	Benjamin Macé	(France)	12	19	12	14	14	14	85
18	Yevgeny Lalenkov	(Russia)	19	14	10	12	12	12	79
19	Denny Morrison	(Canada)	18	6	45	–	–	–	69
20	Lucas Makowsky	(Canada)	10	15	18	10	8	5	66
21	Moritz Geisreiter	(Germany)	6	25	16	16	–	–	63
22	Denis Kuzin	(Kazakhstan)	8	10	6	11	24	–	59
23	Renz Rotteveel	(Netherlands)	16	12	14	–	–	–	42
24	Stefan Groothuis	(Netherlands)	–	–	–	6	25	8	39
25	Tyler Derraugh	(Canada)	0	0	25	8	–	–	33
26	Dmitry Babenko	(Kazakhstan)	14	4	8	–	5	–	31
27	Matteo Anesi	(Italy)	11	8	5	–	–	–	24
28	Thomas Krol	(Netherlands)	8	–	15	–	–	–	23
29	Joo Hyung-joon	(South Korea)	1	0	–	15	6	–	22
30	Jonathan Kuck	(United States)	–	–	–	21	0	–	21
31	Rhian Ket	(Netherlands)	–	2	19	–	–	–	21
32	Joey Mantia	(United States)	–	–	–	0	19	–	19
32	Christoffer Fagerli Rukke	(Norway)	0	–	–	19	–	–	19
34	Mirko Giacomo Nenzi	(Italy)	2	0	11	6	0	–	19
35	Guillaume Blais-Dufour	(Canada)	–	–	–	8	8	–	16
36	Espen Tveit	(Norway)	0	–	–	0	15	–	15
37	Pim Schipper	(Netherlands)	–	–	–	0	11	–	11
37	David Andersson	(Sweden)	0	11	–	–	–	–	11
39	Fyodor Mezentsev	(Kazakhstan)	–	1	8	0	–	–	9
40	Dmitri Fedotov	(Russia)	0	8	0	–	0	–	8
41	Taro Kondo	(Japan)	4	0	2	0	1	–	7
42	Sergey Gryaztsov	(Russia)	0	0	–	0	6	–	6
42	Mathieu Giroux	(Canada)	–	6	–	0	–	–	6
42	Jonathan Garcia	(United States)	6	–	–	–	–	–	6
45	Bram Smallenbroek	(Austria)	0	0	1	1	4	–	6
46	Trevor Marsicano	(United States)	5	0	–	–	–	–	5
47	Patrick Beckert	(Germany)	0	0	0	4	–	–	4
47	Kim Jin-su	(South Korea)	0	0	4	–	–	–	4
49	Aleksandr Zhigin	(Kazakhstan)	0	–	0	0	2	–	2
49	Robert Lehmann	(Germany)	0	0	0	2	0	–	2
