= 2012 World Single Distance Speed Skating Championships – Men's 1500 metres =

The men's 1500 metres race of the 2012 World Single Distance Speed Skating Championships was held on 22 March at 16:30 local time.

== Results ==
Rank	Pair	Lane	Name	Country	Time	Time behind	Notes
1st place, gold medalist(s)	12	o	Denny Morrison	Canada	1:46.44		
2nd place, silver medalist(s)	9	o	Ivan Skobrev	Russia	1:46.49	+0.05	
3rd place, bronze medalist(s)	11	i	Håvard Bøkko	Norway	1:46.50	+0.06	
4	12	i	Shani Davis	United States	1:46.64	+0.20	
5	10	o	Stefan Groothuis	Netherlands	1:46.65	+0.21	
6	4	o	Denis Yuskov	Russia	1:46.81	+0.37	
7	6	i	Jonathan Kuck	United States	1:46.83	+0.39	
8	11	o	Kjeld Nuis	Netherlands	1:47.06	+0.62	
9	7	o	Zbigniew Bródka	Poland	1:47.10	+0.66	
10	9	i	Konrad Niedźwiedzki	Poland	1:47.12	+0.68	
11	7	i	Benjamin Macé	France	1:47.13	+0.69	
12	8	o	Alexis Contin	France	1:47.53	+1.09	
13	5	i	Mathieu Giroux	Canada	1:47.64	+1.20	
14	8	i	Koen Verweij	Netherlands	1:47.74	+1.30	
15	6	o	Sverre Lunde Pedersen	Norway	1:47.86	+1.42	
16	5	o	Bart Swings	Belgium	1:47.90	+1.46	
17	10	i	Brian Hansen	United States	1:47.92	+1.48	
18	4	i	Yevgeny Lalenkov	Russia	1:48.36	+1.92	
19	3	o	Lucas Makowsky	Canada	1:48.45	+2.01	
20	3	i	Mirko Giacomo Nenzi	Italy	1:48.75	+2.31	
21	1	o	Patrick Beckert	Germany	1:49.50	+3.06	
22	2	o	Denis Kuzin	Kazakhstan	1:49.68	+3.24	
23	1	i	Roland Cieslak	Poland	1:50.11	+3.67	
24	2	i	Håvard Holmefjord Lorentzen	Norway	1:50.92	+4.48	
