= 2011–12 ISU Speed Skating World Cup – Men's 1500 metres =

The 1500 metres distance for men in the 2011–12 ISU Speed Skating World Cup was contested over six races on six occasions, out of a total of seven World Cup occasions for the season, with the first occasion taking place in Chelyabinsk, Russia, on 18–20 November 2011, and the final occasion taking place in Berlin, Germany, on 9–11 March 2012.

Håvard Bøkko of Norway won the cup, while Kjeld Nuis of the Netherlands came second, and the defending champion, Shani Davis of the United States, came third.

== Top three ==
Medal	Athlete	Points	Previous season
Gold	(Norway) Håvard Bøkko	472	2nd
Silver	(Netherlands) Kjeld Nuis	430	20th
Bronze	(United States) Shani Davis	425	1st

== Race medallists ==
Occasion #	Location	Date	Gold	Time	Silver	Time	Bronze	Time	Report
1	Chelyabinsk, Russia	18 November	Stefan Groothuis; Netherlands	1:45.70	Shani Davis; United States	1:46.27	Ivan Skobrev; Russia	1:46.47	
2	Astana, Kazakhstan	25 November	Wouter olde Heuvel; Netherlands	1:45.69	Denny Morrison; Canada	1:45.80	Håvard Bøkko; Norway	1:45.97	
3	Heerenveen, Netherlands	2 December	Ivan Skobrev; Russia	1:45.81	Kjeld Nuis; Netherlands	1:45.99	Håvard Bøkko; Norway	1:46.49	
5	Hamar, Norway	12 February	Shani Davis; United States	1:47.08	Håvard Bøkko; Norway	1:47.21	Stefan Groothuis; Netherlands	1:47.55	
6	Heerenveen, Netherlands	2 March	Shani Davis; United States	1:46.89	Kjeld Nuis; Netherlands	1:46.98	Håvard Bøkko; Norway	1:47.21	
7	Berlin, Germany	9 March	Håvard Bøkko; Norway	1:47.49	Kjeld Nuis; Netherlands	1:47.69	Koen Verweij; Netherlands	1:47.727	

== Standings ==
Standings as of 11 March 2012 (end of the season).

#	Name	Nat.	CHE	AST	HVN1	HAM	HVN2	BER	Total
1	Håvard Bøkko	(Norway)	32	70	70	80	70	150	472
2	Kjeld Nuis	(Netherlands)	60	50	80	40	80	120	430
3	Shani Davis	(United States)	80	60	40	100	100	45	425
4	Denny Morrison	(Canada)	50	80	50	60	40	32	312
5	Ivan Skobrev	(Russia)	70	32	100	36	45	18	301
6	Stefan Groothuis	(Netherlands)	100	45	21	70	50	14	300
7	Mark Tuitert	(Netherlands)	45	36	45	–	–	90	216
8	Brian Hansen	(United States)	40	40	–	32	60	40	212
9	Konrad Niedźwiedzki	(Poland)	16	14	14	45	28	75	192
10	Benjamin Macé	(France)	25	28	60	–	24	28	165
11	Koen Verweij	(Netherlands)	–	–	–	25	32	105	162
12	Wouter olde Heuvel	(Netherlands)	36	100	24	–	–	–	160
13	Alexis Contin	(France)	21	21	28	24	21	24	139
14	Zbigniew Bródka	(Poland)	24	6	32	21	16	21	120
15	Sverre Lunde Pedersen	(Norway)	18	16	6	60	–	16	116
16	Jonathan Kuck	(United States)	3	6	15	28	16	36	106
17	Sjoerd de Vries	(Netherlands)	28	24	36	–	–	12	100
18	Lucas Makowsky	(Canada)	10	25	18	18	–	5	76
19	Bart Swings	(Belgium)	2	11	0	16	36	6	71
20	Yevgeny Lalenkov	(Russia)	12	12	16	–	12	10	62
21	Denis Kuzin	(Kazakhstan)	11	4	19	12	10	–	56
22	Mikael Flygind Larsen	(Norway)	14	10	10	14	5	–	53
23	Denis Yuskov	(Russia)	–	–	25	–	19	8	52
24	Håvard Holmefjord Lorentzen	(Norway)	5	15	12	10	–	3	45
25	Moritz Geisreiter	(Germany)	0	19	8	8	6	–	41
26	Mirko Giacomo Nenzi	(Italy)	19	8	5	0	8	–	40
27	Dmitry Babenko	(Kazakhstan)	1	–	–	0	25	4	30
28	Rhian Ket	(Netherlands)	–	–	–	15	14	–	29
29	Jan Szymański	(Poland)	0	0	0	11	15	–	26
30	Christoffer Fagerli Rukke	(Norway)	15	5	6	–	–	–	26
31	Robert Lehmann	(Germany)	2	1	2	8	8	–	21
32	Sven Kramer	(Netherlands)	–	–	–	19	–	–	19
33	Mathieu Giroux	(Canada)	–	18	–	–	–	–	18
34	Sun Longjiang	(China)	–	–	11	–	4	–	15
35	Matteo Anesi	(Italy)	8	0	0	6	–	–	14
36	Gao Xuefeng	(China)	4	–	8	–	–	–	12
37	Bram Smallenbroek	(Austria)	–	–	–	0	11	–	11
38	Roland Cieslak	(Poland)	6	0	1	4	0	–	11
39	Patrick Beckert	(Germany)	–	8	–	–	–	–	8
40	Lee Seung-hoon	(South Korea)	8	–	–	–	–	–	8
41	Li Bailin	(China)	6	–	–	–	2	–	8
42	Aleksandr Lebedev	(Russia)	4	0	4	–	–	–	8
43	Pavel Baynov	(Russia)	0	0	–	1	6	–	7
44	Richard MacLennan	(Canada)	–	–	–	6	0	–	6
45	Aleksandr Rumyantsev	(Russia)	0	–	–	2	–	–	2
45	Haralds Silovs	(Latvia)	–	2	0	–	–	–	2
47	Hubert Hirschbichler	(Germany)	–	–	0	0	1	–	1
48	Enrico Fabris	(Italy)	1	–	–	–	–	–	1
