= 2013–14 ISU Speed Skating World Cup – Men's Grand World Cup =

The men's Grand World Cup of the 2013–14 ISU Speed Skating World Cup was the season overall competition, for which all individual races and distances over the entire season counted, with points awarded to the top five competitors of each race.

Shani Davis of the United States was the overall winner.

== Rules ==
All races and distances that were competed individually, including the mass start, counted.

=== Points system ===
In order to determine an overall World Cup winner, a special points system was used, awarding points for the top five skaters in each individual event.

Points table for Grand World Cup
Rank	World Cup 1–5	World Cup 6
1	10	15
2	8	12
3	7	10.5
4	6	9
5	5	7.5

Note: half points were awarded in distances that were skated twice in the same competition.

=== Prize money ===
The Grand World Cup winner was awarded $20000.

== Standings ==
Standings as of 16 March 2014 (end of the season).

			Calgary					Salt Lake City					Astana					Berlin					Inzell						Heerenveen						
#	Name	Nat.	500	500	1000	1500	5000	500	500	1000	1500	5000	500	500	1000	1500	10 k	500	500	1000	1500	5000	500	500	1000	1500	5000	MS	500	500	1000	1500	5000	MS	Total
1	Shani Davis	(United States)			10	8				10	10				10	5				7					10	6					12	7.5			95.5
2	Koen Verweij	(Netherlands)			5	10	5				7					8									6	7					7.5	12			67.5
3	Jorrit Bergsma	(Netherlands)					8					7										10					10						15		50
4	Michel Mulder	(Netherlands)	3					3.5	3	5					7			5	3.5	8			2.5	3.5						5.25					49.25
5	Denis Yuskov	(Russia)									6					10					7						5					15			43
6	Denny Morrison	(Canada)								6	5				6											8					15				40
7	Brian Hansen	(United States)			7					7	8														7	10									39
8	Zbigniew Bródka	(Poland)														7					8				5	5						10.5			35.5
9	Mo Tae-bum	(South Korea)	4	4					3.5					4				4	5	10															34.5
9	Ronald Mulder	(Netherlands)	5	3.5					4				3.5										5						7.5	6					34.5
11	Kjeld Nuis	(Netherlands)			8	7				8																					10.5				33.5
12	Sven Kramer	(Netherlands)					10					10					10																		30
13	Bart Swings	(Belgium)															6					6						8						9	29
14	Jan Smeekens	(Netherlands)											3										3	5					6	7.5					24.5
15	Patrick Beckert	(Germany)															7										7						9		23
16	Bob de Vries	(Netherlands)																										7						15	22
17	Jan Blokhuijsen	(Netherlands)																				8											12		20
17	Sverre Lunde Pedersen	(Norway)														6					6						8								20
19	Lee Seung-hoon	(South Korea)					7										5					7													19
20	Douwe de Vries	(Netherlands)																				5					6						7.5		18.5
21	Gilmore Junio	(Canada)						5															4						5.25	3.75					18
21	Mark Tuitert	(Netherlands)																													9	9			18
23	Arjan Stroetinga	(Netherlands)																										10						7.5	17.5
24	Nico Ihle	(Germany)																					3.5	4					4.5	4.5					16.5
24	Artyom Kuznetsov	(Russia)	2.5										5	3.5				2.5						3											16.5
24	Keiichiro Nagashima	(Japan)							5					5				3.5	3																16.5
27	Denis Kuzin	(Russia)			6															5	5														16
28	Joji Kato	(Japan)						5					2.5	3					4																14.5
29	Bob de Jong	(Netherlands)					6					8																							14
30	Alexis Contin	(France)				5											8																		13
31	Ivan Skobrev	(Russia)				6						6																							12
31	Maarten Swings	(Belgium)																																12	12
33	Aleksandr Rumyantsev	(Russia)																															10.5		10.5
33	Bram Smallenbroek	(Austria)																																10.5	10.5
35	Tucker Fredricks	(United States)		5				2.5						2.5																					10
35	Joey Mantia	(United States)																			10														10
37	Jamie Gregg	(Canada)	3.5	3.5					2.5																										9.5
38	Stefan Groothuis	(Netherlands)																							8										8
38	Mirko Giacomo Nenzi	(Italy)													8																				8
40	Dmitry Lobkov	(Russia)											4					3																	7
41	Christijn Groeneveld	(Netherlands)																										6							6
41	Håvard Holmefjord Lorentzen	(Norway)																		6															6
43	Mitchell Whitmore	(United States)		2.5				3																											5.5
44	Jonathan Kuck	(United States)										5																							5
44	Patrick Meek	(United States)																										5							5
44	Konrad Niedźwiedzki	(Poland)													5																				5
47	Artur Waś	(Poland)																											4.5						4.5
48	Jesper Hospes	(Netherlands)																	2.5																2.5
48	Yūya Oikawa	(Japan)																						2.5											2.5
#	Name	Nat.	500	500	1000	1500	5000	500	500	1000	1500	5000	500	500	1000	1500	10 k	500	500	1000	1500	5000	500	500	1000	1500	5000	MS	500	500	1000	1500	5000	MS	Total
			Calgary					Salt Lake City					Astana					Berlin					Inzell						Heerenveen						
