= 2014–15 ISU Speed Skating World Cup – Men's 1500 metres =

The 1500 meters distance for men in the 2014–15 ISU Speed Skating World Cup was contested over six races on six occasions, out of a total of seven World Cup occasions for the season, with the first occasion taking place in Obihiro, Japan, on 14–16 November 2014, and the final occasion taking place in Erfurt, Germany, on 21–22 March 2015.

The defending champion was Koen Verweij of the Netherlands. Denny Morrison of Canada won the cup. Verweij had to settle for 11th place.

== Top three ==
Position	Athlete	Points	Previous season
1	(Canada) Denny Morrison	409	7th
2	(Norway) Sverre Lunde Pedersen	405	6th
3	(Netherlands) Kjeld Nuis	381	10th

== Race medallists ==
WC #	Location	Date	Gold	Time	Silver	Time	Bronze	Time	Report
1	Obihiro, Japan	16 November	Kjeld Nuis; Netherlands	1:45.97	Wouter olde Heuvel; Netherlands	1:46.52	Koen Verweij; Netherlands	1:46.90	
2	Seoul, South Korea	21 November	Sverre Lunde Pedersen; Norway	1:47.76	Wouter olde Heuvel; Netherlands	1:48.02	Kjeld Nuis; Netherlands	1:48.30	
3	Berlin, Germany	7 December	Jan Szymański; Poland	1:46.80	Sverre Lunde Pedersen; Norway	1:47.13	Thomas Krol; Netherlands	1:47.14	
4	Heerenveen, Netherlands	14 December	Jan Szymański; Poland	1:45.92	Wouter olde Heuvel; Netherlands	1:46.22	Shani Davis; United States	1:46.33	
5	Hamar, Norway	1 February	Denis Yuskov; Russia	1:45.07	Kjeld Nuis; Netherlands	1:45.80	Denny Morrison; Canada	1:46.03	
7	Erfurt, Germany	22 March	Denny Morrison; Canada	1:46.15	Sverre Lunde Pedersen; Norway	1:46.51	Bart Swings; Belgium	1:46.81	

== Standings ==
Standings as of 22 March 2015.

#	Name	Nat.	OBI	SEO	BER	HVN	HAM	ERF	Total
1	Denny Morrison	(Canada)	60	60	45	24	70	150	409
2	Sverre Lunde Pedersen	(Norway)	28	100	80	32	45	120	405
3	Kjeld Nuis	(Netherlands)	100	70	36	50	80	45	381
4	Wouter olde Heuvel	(Netherlands)	80	80		80	21	40	301
5	Jan Szymański	(Poland)	40	21	100	100		32	293
6	Konrad Niedźwiedzki	(Poland)	45	36	40	45	32	90	288
7	Bart Swings	(Belgium)	21	24	60	60	14	106	285
8	Thomas Krol	(Netherlands)	32	28	70	18	60	76	284
9	Shani Davis	(United States)	50	45	50	70	40		255
10	Zbigniew Bródka	(Poland)	16	32	24	36	36	28	172
11	Koen Verweij	(Netherlands)	70	50	32				152
12	Li Bailin	(China)	25	18	21	16	28	36	144
13	Denis Yuskov	(Russia)			18	19	100		137
14	Sven Kramer	(Netherlands)	36	40		40			116
15	Haralds Silovs	(Latvia)			25	28	50		103
16	Lee Seung-hoon	(South Korea)	19	16	28	21	10		94
17	Håvard Holmefjord Lorentzen	(Norway)	8	4	15	14	12	24	77
18	Sergey Gryaztsov	(Russia)	6	15	16	12	18		67
19	Kim Jin-su	(South Korea)	4	25	14	10			53
19	Joey Mantia	(United States)			4	25	24		53
21	Alec Janssens	(Canada)	15	8	8	8	8		47
22	Mikhail Kozlov	(Russia)	18	5	12	5	6		46
23	Kim Min-seok	(South Korea)	11	12	10	8			41
24	Denis Kuzin	(Kazakhstan)	14	10			11		35
25	Aleksey Suvorov	(Russia)	5	19	6		4		34
26	Danil Sinitsyn	(Russia)				8	25		33
27	Håvard Bøkko	(Norway)				15	16		31
28	Pavel Kulizhnikov	(Russia)	24	6					30
29	Alexis Contin	(France)			2	11	15		28
30	Bram Smallenbroek	(Austria)	8	14	1	1			24
31	Jeffrey Swider-Peltz	(United States)	12	8					20
32	Benjamin Macé	(France)	10		6	4			20
33	Kai Verbij	(Netherlands)			19				19
33	Douwe de Vries	(Netherlands)					19		19
35	Konrád Nagy	(Hungary)	6	11			2		19
36	Ted-Jan Bloemen	(Canada)			8	2	8		18
37	Pim Schipper	(Netherlands)			11	6			17
38	Kirill Gobulev	(Russia)		6					6
38	Piotr Puszkarski	(Poland)					6		6
40	Roland Cieslak	(Poland)		2					2
40	Vincent De Haître	(Canada)	2						2
42	Kim Cheol-min	(South Korea)		1					1
42	Liu Yiming	(China)	1						1
42	Simen Spieler Nilsen	(Norway)					1		1
