= 2013–14 ISU Speed Skating World Cup – Men's 1000 metres =

The 1000 meters distance for men in the 2013–14 ISU Speed Skating World Cup was contested over six races on six occasions, out of a total of six World Cup occasions for the season, with the first occasion taking place in Calgary, Alberta, Canada, on 8–10 November 2013, and the final occasion taking place in Heerenveen, Netherlands, on 14–16 March 2014.

Shani Davis of the United States won the cup, while Denny Morrison of Canada came second, and the defending champion, Kjeld Nuis of the Netherlands, came third.

== Top three ==
Position	Athlete	Points	Previous season
1	(United States) Shani Davis	590	2nd
2	(Canada) Denny Morrison	344	6th
3	(Netherlands) Kjeld Nuis	305	1st

== Race medallists ==
Occasion #	Location	Date	Gold	Time	Silver	Time	Bronze	Time	Report
1	Calgary, Alberta, Canada	9 November	Shani Davis; United States	1:07.46	Kjeld Nuis; Netherlands	1:07.57	Brian Hansen; United States	1:07.64	
2	Salt Lake City, United States	16 November	Shani Davis; United States	1:06.88	Kjeld Nuis; Netherlands	1:07.02	Brian Hansen; United States	1:07.03	
3	Astana, Kazakhstan	30 November	Shani Davis; United States	1:08.66	Mirko Giacomo Nenzi; Italy	1:08.90	Michel Mulder; Netherlands	1:09.02	
4	Berlin, Germany	7 December	Mo Tae-bum; South Korea	1:09.50	Michel Mulder; Netherlands	1:09.52	Shani Davis; United States	1:09.59	
5	Inzell, Germany	8 March	Shani Davis; United States	1:08.70	Stefan Groothuis; Netherlands	1:08.80	Brian Hansen; United States	1:08.90	
6	Heerenveen, Netherlands	14 March	Denny Morrison; Canada	1:08.91	Shani Davis; United States	1:09.13	Kjeld Nuis; Netherlands	1:09.25	

== Standings ==
Standings as of 14 March 2014 (end of the season).

#	Name	Nat.	CAL	SLC	AST	BER	INZ	HVN	Total
1	Shani Davis	(United States)	100	100	100	70	100	120	590
2	Denny Morrison	(Canada)	24	60	60	5	45	150	344
3	Kjeld Nuis	(Netherlands)	80	80			40	105	305
4	Michel Mulder	(Netherlands)	32	50	70	80	28	40	300
5	Koen Verweij	(Netherlands)	50	32	36		60	75	253
6	Brian Hansen	(United States)	70	70			70	36	246
7	Denis Kuzin	(Kazakhstan)	60	36	45	50	6	10	207
8	Stefan Groothuis	(Netherlands)	28		40		80	45	193
9	Mo Tae-bum	(South Korea)	45		28	100			173
10	Håvard Holmefjord Lorentzen	(Netherlands)	2	19	32	60	32	28	173
11	Mirko Giacomo Nenzi	(Italy)	19	14	80	24		32	169
12	Mitchell Whitmore	(United States)	15	45	16	10	16	24	126
13	Aleksey Yesin	(Russia)	18	24	8	32	21	21	124
14	Mark Tuitert	(Netherlands)					25	90	115
15	Jamie Gregg	(Canada)	40	40			18	16	114
16	Joey Mantia	(United States)			19	45	24		88
17	Nico Ihle	(Germany)	8		6	36	36		86
18	Zbigniew Bródka	(Poland)		11	24		50		85
19	Dmitry Lobkov	(Russia)	10	18	12	16	14	12	82
20	Konrad Niedźwiedzki	(Poland)	1	25	50				76
21	Samuel Schwarz	(Germany)	36			40			76
22	Sjoerd de Vries	(Netherlands)	21	16	10	28			75
23	Pekka Koskela	(Finland)	12	28			12	18	70
24	Daniel Greig	(Australia)	16	12	6	8	8	14	64
25	Yevgeny Lalenkov	(Russia)	25		21				46
26	Jonathan Garcia	(United States)			15	21	10		46
27	Haralds Silovs	(Latvia)		15	14	12			41
28	Mika Poutala	(Finland)	14	21	5				40
29	Trevor Marsicano	(United States)	11		18	6			35
30	William Dutton	(Canada)			11	14	8		33
31	Thomas Krol	(Netherlands)				25			25
31	Pim Schipper	(Netherlands)			25				25
33	Fyodor Mezentsev	(Kazakhstan)		1		8	11		20
34	Håvard Bøkko	(Norway)					19		19
34	Keiichiro Nagashima	(Japan)				19			19
36	Hein Otterspeer	(Netherlands)				18			18
37	Tyler Derraugh	(Canada)	6	4	8				18
38	Sverre Lunde Pedersen	(Norway)					15		15
38	Lennart Velema	(Netherlands)				15			15
40	Tian Guojun	(China)			4	11			15
41	Gilmore Junio	(Canada)	4	8					12
42	Lee Kyou-hyuk	(South Korea)	8			2			10
43	Denis Dressel	(Germany)	6				1		7
44	Kim Tae-yun	(South Korea)		6					6
44	Benjamin Macé	(France)				6			6
44	Aleksandr Zhigin	(Kazakhstan)					6		6
47	Mikhail Kozlov	(Russia)					4		4
47	Bart Swings	(Belgium)				4			4
49	David Bosa	(Italy)					2		2
49	Roman Krech	(Kazakhstan)			2				2
49	Sung Ching-Yang	(Chinese Taipei)		2					2
52	Maciej Biega	(Poland)				1			1
52	Denis Yuskov	(Russia)			1				1
