= 2012 World Single Distance Speed Skating Championships – Men's team pursuit =

Skating Championship

The men's team pursuit race of the 2012 World Single Distance Speed Skating Championships was held on March 25, 2012 in Heerenveen, Netherlands.

== Results ==
Rank	Pair	Country	Athletes	Time	Deficit	Notes
1st place, gold medalist(s)	3	Netherlands	Sven Kramer; Koen Verweij; Jan Blokhuijsen	3:41.43		
2nd place, silver medalist(s)	4	United States	Shani Davis; Brian Hansen; Jonathan Kuck	3:43.42	+1.99	
3rd place, bronze medalist(s)	2	Russia	Ivan Skobrev; Denis Yuskov; Yevgeny Lalenkov	3:43.62	+2.19	
4	1	Canada	Denny Morrison; Mathieu Giroux; Lucas Makowsky	3:44.38	+2.95	
5	1	Norway	Sverre Lunde Pedersen; Håvard Bøkko; Kristian Reistad Fredriksen	3:46.33	+4.90	
6	3	Germany	Patrick Beckert; Marco Weber; Robert Lehmann	3:46.48	+5.05	
7	4	South Korea	Lee Seung-hoon; Joo Hyong-jun; Ko Byung-wook	3:47.18	+5.75	
8	2	Poland	Zbigniew Bródka; Konrad Niedźwiedzki; Jan Szymański	3:47.72	+6.29	
