= 2012 World Single Distance Speed Skating Championships – Men's 1000 metres =

The men's 1000 metres race of the 2012 World Single Distance Speed Skating Championships was held on March 23 at 15:00 local time.

== Results ==
Rank	Pair	Lane	Name	Country	Time	Time behind	Notes
1st place, gold medalist(s)	12	o	Stefan Groothuis	Netherlands	1:08.57		
2nd place, silver medalist(s)	12	i	Kjeld Nuis	Netherlands	1:08.79	+0.22	
3rd place, bronze medalist(s)	11	i	Shani Davis	United States	1:08.83	+0.26	
4	11	o	Denny Morrison	Canada	1:09.04	+0.47	
5	9	i	Mo Tae-bum	South Korea	1:09.09	+0.52	
6	6	i	Hein Otterspeer	Netherlands	1:09.55	+0.98	
7	10	i	Jamie Gregg	Canada	1:09.73	+1.16	
8	10	o	Samuel Schwarz	Germany	1:09.75	+1.18	
9	7	o	Aleksey Yesin	Russia	1:09.84	+1.27	
10	8	o	Yevgeny Lalenkov	Russia	1:09.94	+1.37	
11	9	o	Pekka Koskela	Finland	1:09.96	+1.39	
12	5	o	Lee Kyou-hyuk	South Korea	1:09.975	+1.40	
13	8	i	Dmitry Lobkov	Russia	1:09.979	+1.40	
14	7	i	Brian Hansen	United States	1:10.15	+1.58	
15	5	i	Mika Poutala	Finland	1:10.27	+1.70	
16	6	o	Benjamin Macé	France	1:10.31	+1.74	
17	3	o	Muncef Ouardi	Canada	1:10.411	+1.84	
18	4	o	Mirko Giacomo Nenzi	Italy	1:10.414	+1.84	
19	3	i	Roman Krech	Kazakhstan	1:10.59	+2.02	
20	2	i	Keiichiro Nagashima	Japan	1:10.87	+2.30	
21	4	i	Denis Kuzin	Kazakhstan	1:10.89	+2.32	
22	2	o	Daniel Greig	Australia	1:11.00	+2.43	
23	1	i	Mikael Flygind Larsen	Norway	1:11.08	+2.51	
24	1	o	Espen Aarnes Hvammen	Norway	1:12.83	+4.26	
