= 2015 World Single Distance Speed Skating Championships – Men's 1500 metres =

Men's 1500 metres at the 2015 World Single Distance Speed Skating Championships
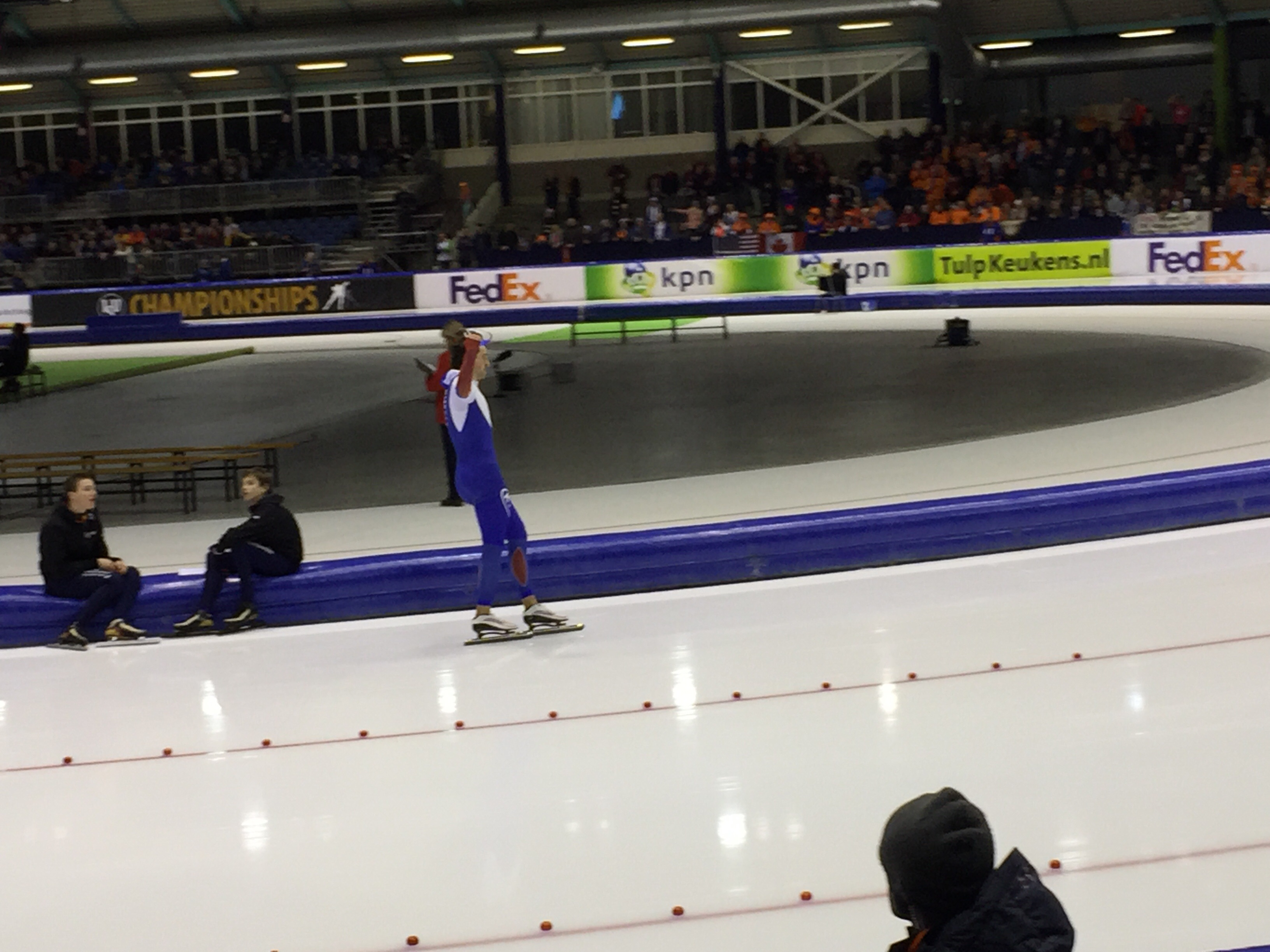
- Event winner Yuskov after his race
- Venue: Thialf, Heerenveen
- Date: 13 February 2015
- Competitors: 24 from 13 nations
- Winning time: 1:43.36

Medalists
gold medal	Denis Yuskov	Russia
silver medal	Denny Morrison	Canada
bronze medal	Koen Verweij	Netherlands

The Men's 1500 metres race of the 2015 World Single Distance Speed Skating Championships was held on 13 February 2015.

== Results ==
The race was started at 18:51.

Rank	Pair	Lane	Name	Country	Time	Diff
1st place, gold medalist(s)	6	o	Denis Yuskov	RUS	1:43.36	
2nd place, silver medalist(s)	9	i	Denny Morrison	CAN	1:45.08	+1.72
3rd place, bronze medalist(s)	7	o	Koen Verweij	NED	1:45.15	+1.79
4	10	o	Shani Davis	USA	1:45.84	+2.48
5	3	o	Alexis Contin	FRA	1:46.02	+2.66
6	8	i	Zbigniew Bródka	POL	1:46.19	+2.83
7	9	o	Bart Swings	BEL	1:46.23	+2.87
8	11	o	Jan Szymański	POL	1:46.24	+2.88
9	12	i	Kjeld Nuis	NED	1:46.32	+2.96
10	10	i	Konrad Niedźwiedzki	POL	1:46.43	+3.07
11	12	o	Sverre Lunde Pedersen	NOR	1:46.53	+3.17
12	3	i	Sergey Gryaztsov	RUS	1:46.91	+3.55
13	5	i	Håvard Bøkko	NOR	1:46.92	+3.56
14	11	i	Wouter olde Heuvel	NED	1:46.97	+3.61
15	2	i	Denis Kuzin	KAZ	1:47.34	+3.98
16	7	i	Haralds Silovs	LAT	1:47.46	+4.10
17	8	o	Li Bailin	CHN	1:47.49	+4.13
18	4	o	Danil Sinitsyn	RUS	1:47.61	+4.25
19	1	i	Alec Janssens	CAN	1:48.18	+4.82
20	1	o	Benjamin Macé	FRA	1:48.23	+4.87
21	6	i	Joey Mantia	USA	1:48.67	+5.31
22	4	i	Håvard Holmefjord Lorentzen	NOR	1:48.93	+5.57
23	2	o	Armin Hager	AUT	1:49.32	+5.96
24	5	o	Kim Jin-su	KOR	1:49.74	+6.38
