= 2015 World Single Distance Speed Skating Championships – Men's 1000 metres =

Men's 1000 metres at the 2015 World Single Distance Speed Skating Championships
- Venue: Thialf, Heerenveen
- Date: 14 February 2015
- Competitors: 24 from 11 nations
- Winning time: 1:08.57

Medalists
gold medal	Shani Davis	United States
silver medal	Pavel Kulizhnikov	Russia
bronze medal	Kjeld Nuis	Netherlands

The men's 1000 metres race of the 2015 World Single Distance Speed Skating Championships was held on 14 February 2015.

== Results ==
The race was started at 15:42.

Rank	Pair	Lane	Name	Country	Time	Diff
1st place, gold medalist(s)	10	i	Shani Davis	USA	1:08.57	
2nd place, silver medalist(s)	11	i	Pavel Kulizhnikov	RUS	1:08.61	+0.04
3rd place, bronze medalist(s)	12	i	Kjeld Nuis	NED	1:08.71	+0.14
4	8	i	Denny Morrison	CAN	1:08.72	+0.15
5	9	i	Hein Otterspeer	NED	1:08.88	+0.31
6	10	o	Stefan Groothuis	NED	1:09.13	+0.56
7	11	o	Nico Ihle	GER	1:09.15	+0.58
8	5	o	Denis Kuzin	KAZ	1:09.40	+0.83
9	12	o	Samuel Schwarz	GER	1:09.42	+0.85
10	4	o	Joey Mantia	USA	1:09.87	+1.30
11	6	i	Mo Tae-bum	KOR	1:09.88	+1.31
12	8	o	Vincent De Haître	CAN	1:10.02	+1.45
13	1	i	Zbigniew Bródka	POL	1:10.14	+1.57
14	5	i	Richard Maclennan	CAN	1:10.18	+1.61
15	9	o	Aleksey Yesin	RUS	1:10.26	+1.69
16	3	i	Piotr Michalski	POL	1:10.29	+1.72
17	2	o	Pekka Koskela	FIN	1:10.31	+1.74
18	7	o	Håvard Holmefjord Lorentzen	NOR	1:10.32	+1.75
19	1	o	Sverre Lunde Pedersen	NOR	1:10.39	+1.82
20	3	o	Kirill Golubev	RUS	1:10.53	+1.96
21	6	o	Jonathan Garcia	USA	1:10.59	+2.02
22	2	i	Denis Dressel	GER	1:10.68	+2.11
23	4	i	Kim Jin-su	KOR	1:10.88	+2.31
24	7	i	Yang Fan	CHN	1:10.90	+2.33
