= 2017 World Single Distances Speed Skating Championships – Men's 1500 metres =

Men's 1500 metres at the 2017 World Single Distances Speed Skating Championships
- Venue: Gangneung Oval
- Location: Gangneung, South Korea
- Dates: 12 February
- Competitors: 24 from 11 nations
- Winning time: 1:44.36

Medalists
gold medal	Kjeld Nuis	Netherlands
silver medal	Denis Yuskov	Russia
bronze medal	Sven Kramer	Netherlands

The Men's 1500 metres competition at the 2017 World Single Distances Speed Skating Championships was held on 12 February 2017.

== Results ==
The race was started at 19:04.

Rank	Pair	Lane	Name	Country	Time	Diff
1st place, gold medalist(s)	11	o	Kjeld Nuis	Netherlands	1:44.36	
2nd place, silver medalist(s)	11	i	Denis Yuskov	Russia	1:44.67	+0.31
3rd place, bronze medalist(s)	7	o	Sven Kramer	Netherlands	1:45.50	+1.14
4	8	o	Vincent De Haitre	Canada	1:45.79	+1.43
5	6	i	Kim Min-seok	South Korea	1:46.05	+1.69
6	10	i	Patrick Roest	Netherlands	1:46.16	+1.80
7	10	o	Joey Mantia	United States	1:46.70	+2.34
8	4	o	Jan Szymański	Poland	1:46.74	+2.38
9	12	i	Bart Swings	Belgium	1:46.75	+2.39
10	6	o	Konrad Niedźwiedzki	Poland	1:46.78	+2.42
11	8	i	Shani Davis	United States	1:46.84	+2.48
12	4	i	Sergey Gryaztsov	Russia	1:46.92	+2.56
13	2	o	Peter Michael	New Zealand	1:46.95	+2.59
14	12	o	Sverre Lunde Pedersen	Norway	1:46.99	+2.63
15	7	i	Shota Nakamura	Japan	1:47.09	+2.73
16	5	i	Takuro Oda	Japan	1:47.15	+2.79
17	9	o	Sergey Trofimov	Russia	1:47.18	+2.82
18	5	o	Brian Hansen	United States	1:47.28	+2.92
19	3	o	Taro Kondo	Japan	1:47.34	+2.98
20	1	i	Sindre Henriksen	Norway	1:47.36	+3.00
21	1	o	Zbigniew Bródka	Poland	1:47.58	+3.22
22	9	i	Håvard Holmefjord Lorentzen	Norway	1:47.97	+3.61
23	3	i	Nicola Tumolero	Italy	1:48.41	+4.05
—	2	i	Benjamin Donnelly	Canada	DSQ	
