= 2011 World Single Distance Speed Skating Championships – Men's 1000 metres =

The men's 1000 m race of the 2011 World Single Distance Speed Skating Championships was held on March 11 at 14:00 local time.

== Results ==
Rank	Pair	Lane	Name	Country	Time	Time behind	Notes
1st place, gold medalist(s)	11	o	Shani Davis	United States	1:08.45		
2nd place, silver medalist(s)	5	o	Kjeld Nuis	Netherlands	1:08.67	+0.22	
3rd place, bronze medalist(s)	12	o	Stefan Groothuis	Netherlands	1:08.73	+0.28	
4	11	i	Lee Kyou-hyuk	South Korea	1:08.91	+0.46	
5	10	i	Denny Morrison	Canada	1:08.92	+0.47	
6	12	i	Simon Kuipers	Netherlands	1:09.21	+0.76	
7	4	o	Pekka Koskela	Finland	1:09.25	+0.80	
8	5	i	Mo Tae-bum	South Korea	1:09.39	+0.94	
9	9	o	Samuel Schwarz	Germany	1:09.64	+1.19	
10	4	i	Philippe Riopel	Canada	1:09.71	+1.26	
11	10	o	Mikael Flygind Larsen	Norway	1:09.82	+1.37	
12	6	i	Trevor Marsicano	United States	1:09.90	+1.45	
13	3	i	Yevgeny Lalenkov	Russia	1:09.92	+1.47	
14	7	o	Jamie Gregg	Canada	1:09.93	+1.48	
15	2	o	Espen Aarnes Hvammen	Norway	1:09.96	+1.51	
16	8	o	Denis Kuzin	Kazakhstan	1:10.01	+1.56	
17	1	o	Christoffer Fagerli Rukke	Norway	1:10.20	+1.75	
18	9	i	Nico Ihle	Germany	1:10.58	+2.13	
19	1	i	Ermanno Ioriatti	Italy	1:10.86	+2.41	
20	2	i	Ryohei Haga	Japan	1:11.26	+2.81	
21	3	o	Daniel Greig	Australia	1:11.55	+3.10	
22	6	o	Matteo Anesi	Italy	1:12.08	+3.63	
–	8	i	Dmitry Lobkov	Russia		DQ	
–	7	i	Aleksey Yesin	Russia		DQ	
