= 2014–15 ISU Speed Skating World Cup – Men's Grand World Cup =

The men's Grand World Cup of the 2014–15 ISU Speed Skating World Cup was the season overall competition, for which all individual races and distances over the entire season counted, with points awarded to the top five competitors of each race.

Shani Davis of the United States was the defending champion. Pavel Kulizhnikov of Russia won the Grand World Cup. Davis ended up in 11th place.

== Rules ==
All races and distances that were competed individually, including the mass start, counted.

=== Points system ===
In order to determine an overall World Cup winner, a special points system was used, awarding points for the top five skaters in each individual event.

Points table for Grand World Cup
Rank	World Cup 1–6	World Cup 7
1	100	150
2	80	120
3	70	106
4	60	90
5	50	76

Note: half points were awarded in distances that were skated twice in the same competition.

=== Prize money ===
The Grand World Cup winner was awarded $20000.

== Standings ==
Standings as of 22 March 2015 (end of the season).

				Obihiro						Seoul						Berlin						Heerenveen (1)						Hamar			Heerenveen (2)				Erfurt						
#	Name	Nat.	Total	500	500	1000	1500	5000	MS	500	500	1000	1500	10 k	MS	500	500	1000	1500	5000	MS	500	500	1000	1500	5000	MS	1500	5000	MS	500	500	1000	1000	500	500	1000	1500	5000	MS	Total
1	Pavel Kulizhnikov	(Russia)	985	40	50	100				50	50	100						50				50	50	100							50	50	40	40	75		90				985
2	Bart Swings	(Belgium)	806						70					80					60	50	70				60					70								106	90	150	806
3	Sverre Lunde Pedersen	(Norway)	786										100	60					80	80						50			70									120	120	106	786
4	Kjeld Nuis	(Netherlands)	750			80	100					70	70											80	50			80					50	50			120				750
5	Jorrit Bergsma	(Netherlands)	710																	100	60					80	100		100										150	120	710
6	Denny Morrison	(Canada)	515				60						60															70					25				150	150			515
7	Wouter olde Heuvel	(Netherlands)	456				80	70					80												80	70													76		456
8	Lee Seung-hoon	(South Korea)	450						100						70						100						80			100											450
9	Nico Ihle	(Germany)	436	25						30						25		100													35	35	35	30		45	76				436
10	Patrick Beckert	(Germany)	316					50	50					50															60										106		316
11	Shani Davis	(United States)	295			50	50					50							50						70									25							295
12	Andrea Giovannini	(Italy)	286												100												50			60										76	286
13	Laurent Dubreuil	(Canada)	280								35					40	35					35	30												45	60					280
13	Bob de Jong	(Netherlands)	280					60						100						60						60															280
15	Ruslan Murashov	(Russia)	255	35	30					35	25																				25	30				75					255
16	Michel Mulder	(Netherlands)	240													35						30									30	25			60	60					240
17	Artur Waś	(Poland)	220													50	50					40	40								40										220
18	Thomas Krol	(Netherlands)	206																70									60										76			206
19	Sven Kramer	(Netherlands)	200					100																		100															200
19	Hein Otterspeer	(Netherlands)	200	30														70						70									30								200
19	Samuel Schwarz	(Germany)	200			70												80						50																	200
19	Jan Szymański	(Poland)	200																100						100																200
23	Mo Tae-bum	(South Korea)	170		25					40	40						25															40									170
23	Marco Weber	(Germany)	170																											80										90	170
25	Vincent De Haître	(Canada)	166			60																															106				166
26	Aleksey Yesin	(Russia)	158															60						60											38						158
27	Jan Smeekens	(Netherlands)	155	50	40						30												35																		155
28	Aleksandr Rumyantsev	(Russia)	150					80						70																											150
28	Douwe de Vries	(Netherlands)	150																	70									80												150
28	Denis Yuskov	(Russia)	150																									100	50												150
31	Haralds Silovs	(Latvia)	130												80													50													130
32	Koen Verweij	(Netherlands)	120				70						50																												120
33	Stefan Groothuis	(Netherlands)	115									80																						35							115
34	Espen Aarnes Hvammen	(Norway)	103							25							40																			38					103
35	Konrad Niedźwiedzki	(Poland)	90																																			90			90
36	Kim Cheol-min	(South Korea)	80						80																																80
36	Arjan Stroetinga	(Netherlands)	80																		80																				80
38	Fabio Francolini	(Italy)	70																								70														70
39	Ryohei Haga	(Japan)	65		35											30																									65
40	Alexej Baumgärtner	(Germany)	60						60																																60
40	Tyler Derraugh	(Canada)	60																								60														60
40	Linus Heidegger	(Austria)	60												60																										60
40	Kai Verbij	(Netherlands)	60									60																													60
44	Gerben Jorritsma	(Netherlands)	53																																53						53
45	Armin Hager	(Austria)	50																											50											50
45	Mika Poutala	(Finland)	50																			25	25																		50
45	Bram Smallenbroek	(Austria)	50												50																										50
45	Robert Watson	(Canada)	50																		50																				50
49	Denis Koval	(Russia)	30														30																								30
#	Name	Nat.	Total	500	500	1000	1500	5000	MS	500	500	1000	1500	10 k	MS	500	500	1000	1500	5000	MS	500	500	1000	1500	5000	MS	1500	5000	MS	500	500	1000	1000	500	500	1000	1500	5000	MS	Total
				Obihiro						Seoul						Berlin						Heerenveen (1)						Hamar			Heerenveen (2)				Erfurt						
