= 2011 World Single Distance Speed Skating Championships – Men's team pursuit =

The men's team pursuit race of the 2011 World Single Distance Speed Skating Championships was held on 13 March at 16:15 local time.

== Results ==
Rank	Pair	Country	Athletes	Time	Deficit	Notes
1st place, gold medalist(s)	3	United States	Shani Davis; Trevor Marsicano; Jonathan Kuck	3:41.72		
2nd place, silver medalist(s)	4	Canada	Denny Morrison; Lucas Makowsky; Mathieu Giroux	3:41.85	+0.13	
3rd place, bronze medalist(s)	1	Netherlands	Bob de Vries; Jan Blokhuijsen; Koen Verweij	3:43.44	+1.72	
4	2	Germany	Marco Weber; Tobias Schneider; Robert Lehmann	3:45.54	+3.82	
5	3	Norway	Mikael Flygind Larsen; Håvard Bøkko; Sverre Lunde Pedersen	3:45.73	+4.01	
6	4	Russia	Ivan Skobrev; Aleksandr Rumyantsev; Pavel Baynov	3:46.02	+4.30	
7	2	Italy	Matteo Anesi; Marco Cignini; Luca Stefani	3:49.68	+7.96	
8	1	Poland	Konrad Niedźwiedzki; Zbigniew Bródka; Jan Szymański	3:52.24	+10.52	
