= 2016 World Single Distances Speed Skating Championships – Men's 1500 metres =

Men's 1500 metres at the 2016 World Single Distances Speed Skating Championships
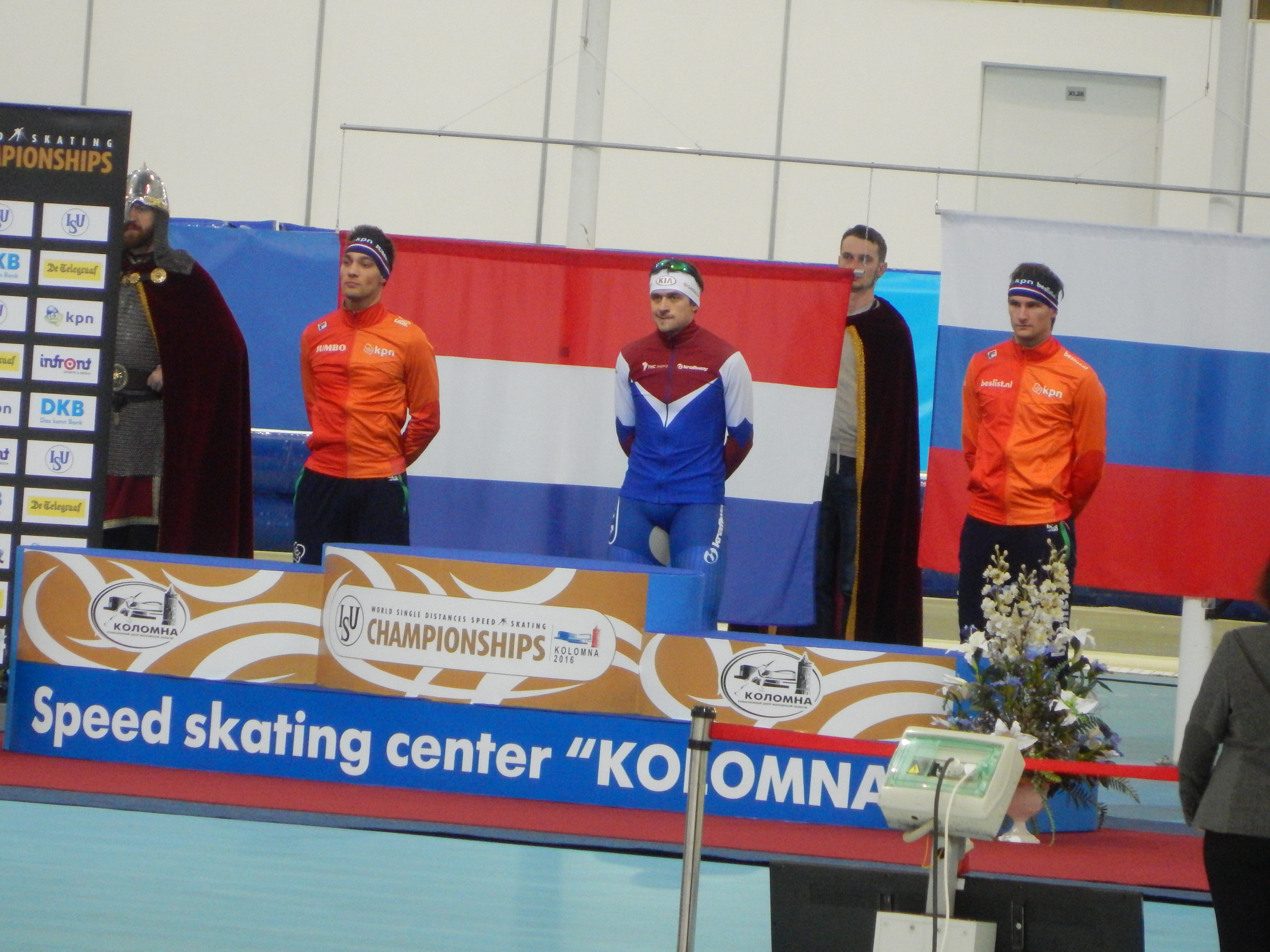
- Victory Ceremony
- Venue: Kolomna Speed Skating Center, Kolomna
- Date: 12 February
- Competitors: 20 from 12 nations
- Winning time: 1:44.13

Medalists
gold medal	Denis Yuskov	Russia
silver medal	Kjeld Nuis	Netherlands
bronze medal	Thomas Krol	Netherlands

The Men's 1500 metres race of the 2016 World Single Distances Speed Skating Championships was held on 11 February 2016.

== Results ==
The race was started at 18:07.

Rank	Pair	Lane	Name	Country	Time	Diff
1st place, gold medalist(s)	10	i	Denis Yuskov	RUS	1:44.13	
2nd place, silver medalist(s)	9	i	Kjeld Nuis	NED	1:45.66	+1.53
3rd place, bronze medalist(s)	10	o	Thomas Krol	NED	1:45.75	+1.62
4	8	i	Bart Swings	BEL	1:46.21	+2.08
5	7	o	Shani Davis	USA	1:46.49	+2.36
6	8	o	Vincent De Haître	CAN	1:46.82	+2.69
7	5	o	Sindre Henriksen	NOR	1:47.22	+3.09
8	5	i	Haralds Silovs	LAT	1:47.57	+3.44
9	6	i	Takuro Oda	JPN	1:47.68	+3.55
10	6	o	Sergey Trofimov	RUS	1:47.69	+3.56
11	1	o	Mikhail Kozlov	RUS	1:47.76	+3.63
12	4	i	David Andersson	SWE	1:47.91	+3.78
13	4	o	Denis Kuzin	KAZ	1:48.38	+4.25
14	2	i	Stefan Groothuis	NED	1:48.55	+4.42
15	7	i	Li Bailin	CHN	1:49.16	+5.03
16	3	o	Vitaly Mikhailov	BLR	1:49.27	+5.14
17	2	o	Magnus Myhren Kristensen	NOR	1:50.36	+6.23
18	1	i	Stefan Waples	CAN	1:50.69	+6.56
19	3	i	Fan Yang	CHN	1:53.52	+9.39
20	9	o	Joey Mantia	USA		DSQ
