= 2013 World Single Distance Speed Skating Championships – Men's team pursuit =

Event in 2013

Men's team pursuit at the 2013 World Single Distance Speed Skating Championships
- Venue: Adler Arena, Sochi
- Date: 24 March 2013
- Competitors: 24 from 8 nations
- Teams: 8
- Winning time: 3:42.03

Medalists
gold medal	Jan Blokhuijsen; Sven Kramer; Koen Verweij	Netherlands
silver medal	Joo Hyong-jun; Kim Cheol-min; Lee Seung-hoon	South Korea
bronze medal	Zbigniew Bródka; Konrad Niedźwiedzki; Jan Szymański	Poland

The men's team pursuit race of the 2013 World Single Distance Speed Skating Championships was held on 24 March at 18:51 local time.

== Results ==
Rank	Pair	Country	Athletes	Time	Deficit	Notes
1st place, gold medalist(s)	3	Netherlands	Jan Blokhuijsen; Sven Kramer; Koen Verweij	3:42.03		
2nd place, silver medalist(s)	4	South Korea	Joo Hyong-jun; Kim Cheol-min; Lee Seung-hoon	3:44.60	+2.57	
3rd place, bronze medalist(s)	1	Poland	Zbigniew Bródka; Konrad Niedźwiedzki; Jan Szymański	3:45.22	+3.19	
4	4	Russia	Yevgeny Lalenkov; Ivan Skobrev; Denis Yuskov	3:46.59	+4.56	
5	3	Norway	Håvard Bøkko; Sverre Lunde Pedersen; Simen Spieler Nilsen	3:48.68	+6.65	
6	2	Germany	Alexej Baumgärtner; Patrick Beckert; Marco Weber	3:48.83	+6.80	
7	2	Canada	Jordan Belchos; Lucas Makowsky; Denny Morrison	3:49.00	+6.97	
8	1	Italy	Matteo Anesi; Mirko Giacomo Nenzi; Luca Stefani	3:53.08	+11.05	
