= List of Canadian records in speed skating =

The following are the national records in speed skating in Canada maintained by Speed Skating Canada.

== Men ==
Event	Record	Athlete	Date	Meet	Place	Ref
500 meters	33.77	Laurent Dubreuil	10 December 2021	World Cup	Calgary, Canada	
500 meters × 2	68.31 WR	Jeremy Wotherspoon	15 March 2008	Olympic Oval Final	Calgary, Canada	
1000 meters	1:06.72	Vincent De Haître	25 February 2017	World Sprint Championships	Calgary, Canada	
1500 meters	1:42.01	Denny Morrison	14 March 2008	Olympic Oval Final	Calgary, Canada	
3000 meters	3:37.04	Ted-Jan Bloemen	30 December 2017	Time Trials	Calgary, Canada	
5000 meters	6:01.86	Ted-Jan Bloemen	10 December 2017	World Cup	Salt Lake City, United States	
10000 meters	12:33.75	Ted-Jan Bloemen	17 December 2022	World Cup	Calgary, Canada	
Team sprint (3 laps)	1:17.17 WR	Anders Johnson; Laurent Dubreuil; Antoine Gélinas-Beaulieu	15 February 2024	World Single Distances Championships	Calgary, Canada	
Team pursuit (8 laps)	3:36.44	Denny Morrison; Ted-Jan Bloemen; Benjamin Donnelly	8 December 2017	World Cup	Salt Lake City, United States	
Sprint combination	136.730 pts	Laurent Dubreuil	25–26 February 2017	World Sprint Championships	Calgary, Canada	
Small combination	148.210 pts	Philippe Riopel	March 2008	Olympic Oval Final	Calgary, Canada	
Big combination	148.630 pts	Ted-Jan Bloemen	2–3 March 2019	World Allround Championships	Calgary, Canada	

== Women ==
Event	Record	Athlete	Date	Meet	Place	Ref
500 meters	37.22	Catriona LeMay Doan	9 December 2001	World Cup	Calgary, Canada	
500 meters × 2	74.72	Catriona LeMay Doan	9 March 2001	World Single Distance Championships	Salt Lake City, United States	
1000 meters	1:12.68	Christine Nesbitt	28 January 2012	World Sprint Championships	Calgary, Canada	
1500 meters	1:51.76	Ivanie Blondin	8 February 2020	World Cup	Calgary, Canada	
3000 meters	3:53.34	Cindy Klassen	18 March 2006	World Allround Championships	Calgary, Canada	
5000 meters	6:46.81	Isabelle Weidemann	14 October 2021	Canadian Long Track Championships	Calgary, Canada	
10000 meters	14:19.73	Clara Hughes	11 March 2005	Olympic Oval Final	Calgary, Canada	
Team sprint (3 laps)	1:24.90	Carolina Hiller; Béatrice Lamarche; Ivanie Blondin	26 January 2025	World Cup	Calgary, Canada	
Team pursuit (6 laps)	2:52.06	Valérie Maltais; Ivanie Blondin; Isabelle Weidemann	11 December 2021	World Cup	Calgary, Canada	
Sprint combination	148.630 pts	Christine Nesbitt	28–29 January 2012	World Sprint Championships	Calgary, Canada	
Mini combination	155.576 pts	Cindy Klassen	15–17 March 2001	Olympic Oval Final	Calgary, Canada	
Small combination	154.580 pts WR	Cindy Klassen	18–19 March 2006	World Allround Championships	Calgary, Canada	

== Mixed ==
Event	Record	Athlete	Date	Meet	Place	Ref
Relay	2:56.24	Yankun Zhao; Ivanie Blondin	28 January 2024	World Cup	Salt Lake City, United States	
