= Kjeld Nuis =

Dutch speed skater (born 1989)

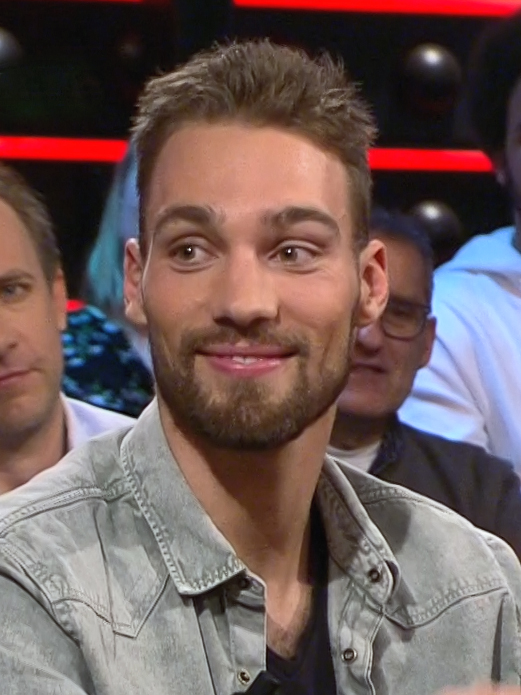
- Nuis in 2018

Personal information
- Nationality: Dutch
- Born: 10 November 1989 (age 36) Leiden, Netherlands
- Height: 1.86 m (6 ft 1 in)
- Weight: 87 kg (192 lb)

Sport
- Country: Netherlands
- Sport: Speed skating
- Events: 1000 m, 1500 m
- Club: Team Reggeborgh
- Turned pro: 2009
Medal record
Men's speed skating
Representing the Netherlands
Olympic Games
Gold medal – first place	2018 Pyeongchang	1000 m
Gold medal – first place	2018 Pyeongchang	1500 m
Gold medal – first place	2022 Beijing	1500 m
Bronze medal – third place	2026 Milano Cortina	1500 m
World Single Distance Championships
Gold medal – first place	2017 Gangneung	1000 m
Gold medal – first place	2017 Gangneung	1500 m
Gold medal – first place	2019 Inzell	Team sprint
Gold medal – first place	2020 Salt Lake City	1500 m
Silver medal – second place	2011 Inzell	1000 m
Silver medal – second place	2012 Heerenveen	1000 m
Silver medal – second place	2016 Kolomna	1500 m
Silver medal – second place	2020 Salt Lake City	1000 m
Silver medal – second place	2021 Heerenveen	1500 m
Silver medal – second place	2023 Heerenveen	1500 m
Silver medal – second place	2024 Calgary	1500 m
Bronze medal – third place	2015 Heerenveen	1000 m
Bronze medal – third place	2016 Kolomna	1000 m
Bronze medal – third place	2019 Inzell	1000 m
Bronze medal – third place	2024 Calgary	1000 m
World Sprint Championships
Silver medal – second place	2016 Seoul	Sprint
Silver medal – second place	2018 Changchun	Sprint
Bronze medal – third place	2017 Calgary	Sprint
Bronze medal – third place	2019 Heerenveen	Sprint
European Championships
Gold medal – first place	2022 Heerenveen	1500 m
Gold medal – first place	2024 Heerenveen	1000 m
Silver medal – second place	2017 Heerenveen	Sprint
Silver medal – second place	2022 Heerenveen	1000 m
Silver medal – second place	2024 Heerenveen	1500 m

Kjeld Nuis (Dutch pronunciation: [kjɛlt ˈnœys]; born 10 November 1989) is a Dutch speed skater and three-time Olympic gold medalist.

Nuis is a specialist in the middle distances of 1000 and 1500 meters. At the 2018 Winter Olympics in Pyeongchang, he won the gold medal at the 1500 m and 1000 m events. At the 2022 Winter Olympics, he successfully defended his title on the 1500 m. He is the current holder of the world record over 1500 meters.

== Career ==
Nuis is a three-time Olympic champion, having won Olympic gold in both the 1000 and 1500 meters at the 2018 Winter Olympics. He won another gold in the 1500 meters four years later, improving Derek Parra's twenty-year-old Olympic record to 1:43.21 in the process. He is also a two-time world single-distance champion over 1000 and 1500 meters. He is a multi-time world single distance medalist over 1000 and 1500 meters, a four-time season overall World Cup winner of the 1000 meters distance, and a two-time winner over 1500 meters.

On 10 March 2019, he set the world record for the 1500-meter event to 1:40.17 in the Utah Olympic Oval during the finals of the 2018–19 World Cup tour. A day earlier, in the same event, he also improved the 1000 meters world record to 1:06.18, which stood until it was broken by Pavel Kulizhnikov on 15 February 2020.

In Savalen, Norway on 17 March 2022, he set a new world speed skating record of 103 kilometers per hour, beating his previous 4-year-old record by 10 km/h.

At the 2026 Winter Olympics, Nuis won bronze in the 1500 m, becoming the first male speed skater to medal in the 1500 meters at three different Winter Olympics.

== Personal life ==
From 2014 until the end of 2018, Nuis was in a relationship with Miss Nederland World 2011 Jill Lauren de Robles. They have a son.

On 19 December 2018, Nuis was named Dutch Sportsman of the Year 2018 at the NOC NSF Sport Gala.

Nuis has been in a relationship with fellow speed skater and Olympic silver medalist Joy Beune since 2019. The pair live together in Heerenveen.

== Records ==
=== Personal records ===
Personal records
Speed skating
Event	Result	Date	Location	Notes
500 meter	34.79	13 November 2015	Olympic Oval, Calgary	
1000 meter	1:06.18	9 March 2019	Utah Olympic Oval, Salt Lake City	Former World record.
1500 meter	1:40.17	10 March 2019	Utah Olympic Oval, Salt Lake City	Current World record.
3000 meter	3:46.18	11 October 2014	Eisstadion Inzell, Inzell	
5000 meter	7:21.30	2 February 2008	Kardinge ijsbaan (nl)	

=== World records established ===
Nr.	Event	Result	Date	Location	Notes
1.	1000 meter	1:06.18	9 March 2019	Salt Lake City	World record until 12 February 2020
2.	1500 meter	1:40.17	10 March 2019	Salt Lake City	Current world record

== Tournament overview ==
Season	Dutch Championships Single Distances	Dutch Championships Sprint	European Championships Single Distances	European Championships Sprint	World Championships Sprint	World Championships Single Distances	Olympic Games	World Cup GWC
2009–10	HEERENVEEN 16th 500m 11th 1000m 6th 1500m	HEERENVEEN 11th 500m 4th 1000m 4th 500m 4th 1000m 5th overall						51st 1000m 10th 1500m
2010–11		HEERENVEEN 5th 500m DQ 1000; 7th 500m DNS 1000m NC overall			HEERENVEEN 8th 500m 5th 1000m 17th 500m 4th 1000m 5th overall	INZELL (silver) 1000m		19th 1000m 20th 1500m
2011–12	HEERENVEEN 7th 500m (bronze) 1000m (silver) 1500m	HEERENVEEN 24th 500m (bronze) 1000m 8th 500m 7th 1000m 23rd overall				HEERENVEEN (silver) 1000m 8th 1500m		(bronze) 1000m (silver) 1500m (gold) GWC
2012–13	HEERENVEEN 5th 500m (gold) 1000m (gold) 1500m	HEERENVEEN 6th 500m 7th 1000m (bronze) 500m 7th 1000m 6th overall				SOCHI 4th 1000m 10th 1500m		20th 500m (gold) 1000m 11th 1500m
2013–14	HEERENVEEN 500m (gold) 1000m (silver) 1500m	HEERENVEEN 6th 500m (gold) 1000m 4th 500m (silver) 1000m (bronze) overall			GANGNEUNG 18th 500m (bronze) 1000m 8th 500m 4th 1000m 5th overall		'	39th 500m (bronze) 1000m 10th 1500m 11th GWC
2014–15	HEERENVEEN 11th 500m (gold) 1000m 4th 1500m	HEERENVEEN 9th 500m (silver) 1000m 10th 500m (silver) 1000m 4th overall				HEERENVEEN (bronze) 1000m 9th 1500m		(silver) 1000m (bronze) 1500m 4th GWC
2015–16	HEERENVEEN (gold) 1000m (gold) 1500m				SEOUL 14th 500m (gold) 1000m 16th 500m (gold) 1000m (silver) overall	KOLOMNA (bronze) 1000m (silver) 1500m		(gold) 1000m (silver) 1500m (gold) GWC
2016–17	HEERENVEEN 4th 500m (silver) 1000m (silver) 1500m			HEERENVEEN 9th 500m (gold) 1000m 7th 500m (gold) 1000m (silver) overall	CALGARY 18th 500m (gold) 1000m 16th 500m (gold) 1000m (bronze) overall	GANGNEUNG (gold) 1000m (gold) 1500m		40th 500m (gold) 1000m (gold) 1500m (gold) GWC
2017–18	HEERENVEEN 7th 500m (silver) 1000m 6th 1500m				CHANGCHUNG 12th 500m (gold) 1000m 14th 500m (gold) 1000m (silver) overall		GANGNEUNG (gold) 1000m (gold) 1500m	35th 500m (gold) 1000m 15th 1500m
2018–19	HEERENVEEN 4th 500m (gold) 1000m (gold) 1500m			COLLALBO (bronze) 500m DQ 1000m 4th 500m DNS 1000m NC overall	HEERENVEEN 9th 500m (gold) 1000m 7th 500m (gold) 1000m (bronze) overall	INZELL (bronze) 1000m 5th 1500m (gold) Team sprint		37th 500m (gold) 1000m (bronze) 1500m
2019–20					HAMAR 15th 500m 4th 1000m 11th 500m (gold) 1000m 7th overall	SALT LAKE CITY (silver) 1000m (gold) 1500m		4th 1000m (gold) 1500m (gold) Team sprint
2020–21	HEERENVEEN 7th 500m–1 DNS 500m–2 (bronze) 1000m	HEERENVEEN DQ 500m (bronze) 1000m 7th 500m DNQ 1000m NC overall				HEERENVEEN (silver) 1500m		(silver) 1500m
2021–22	HEERENVEEN 8th 500m–1 DNS 500m–2 4th 1000m (silver) 1500m		HEERENVEEN (silver) 1000m (gold) 1500m				BEIJING (gold) 1500m	1000m (silver); 1500m (bronze)
2022–23	HEERENVEEN (gold) 1000m (bronze) 1500m	HEERENVEEN 9th 500m (bronze) 1000m 7th 500m (gold) 1000m 5th overall				HEERENVEEN 4th 1000m (silver) 1500m		21st 1000m (gold) 1500m

== World Cup overview ==
Season	500 meter											
2009–2010												
2010–2011												
2011–2012												
2012–2013	15th	8th	–	–	14th	18th	2nd(b)	–	14th	14th	12th	–
2013–2014	20th	17th	18th	–	–	–	–	–	–	–	–	–
2014–2015												
2015–2016	13th	–	–	6th(b)	–	3rd(b)	–	–	–	2nd(b)		
2016–2017	–	1st(b)	DQ	–	–	–	–	–	–	–		
2017–2018	–	–	–	–	–	–	–	1st(b)	–	–	–	
2018–2019	13th	–	1st(b)	–	–	–	–	–	–	–	–	
2019–2020												
2020–2021												
2021–2022												
2022–2023												

Season	1000 meter								
2009–2010	–	–	–	7th(b)	–	–			
2010–2011	–	–	–	–	1st(b)	5th			
2011–2012	2nd place, silver medalist(s)	2nd place, silver medalist(s)	1st place, gold medalist(s)	DQ	8th	3rd place, bronze medalist(s)	2nd place, silver medalist(s)		
2012–2013	3rd place, bronze medalist(s)	5th	3rd place, bronze medalist(s)	4th	4th	2nd place, silver medalist(s)	4th	9th	3rd place, bronze medalist(s)
2013–2014	2nd place, silver medalist(s)	2nd place, silver medalist(s)	–	–	7th	3rd place, bronze medalist(s)			
2014–2015	2nd place, silver medalist(s)	3rd place, bronze medalist(s)	12th	2nd place, silver medalist(s)	1st place, gold medalist(s)	1st place, gold medalist(s)	2nd place, silver medalist(s)		
2015–2016	3rd place, bronze medalist(s)	2nd place, silver medalist(s)	1st place, gold medalist(s)	3rd place, bronze medalist(s)	2nd place, silver medalist(s)	2nd place, silver medalist(s)	1st place, gold medalist(s)		
2016–2017	1st place, gold medalist(s)	1st place, gold medalist(s)	–	1st place, gold medalist(s)	1st place, gold medalist(s)	–			
2017–2018	7th	4th	2nd place, silver medalist(s)	–	1st place, gold medalist(s)	1st place, gold medalist(s)			
2018–2019	2nd place, silver medalist(s)	1st place, gold medalist(s)	–	1st place, gold medalist(s)	3rd place, bronze medalist(s)	1st place, gold medalist(s)			
2019–2020	3rd place, bronze medalist(s)	2nd place, silver medalist(s)	–	3rd place, bronze medalist(s)	5th				
2020–2021									
2021–2022	3rd place, bronze medalist(s)	3rd place, bronze medalist(s)	2nd place, silver medalist(s)	–	1st place, gold medalist(s)				
2022–2023	–	7th	–	1st(b)	2nd place, silver medalist(s)	–			

Season	1500 meter					
2009–2010	–	–	1st(b)	13th	19th	3rd place, bronze medalist(s)
2010–2011	–	–	–	9th	1st(b)	–
2011–2012	4th	5th	2nd place, silver medalist(s)	7th	2nd place, silver medalist(s)	2nd place, silver medalist(s)
2012–2013	9th	8th	–	–	–	4th
2013–2014	3rd place, bronze medalist(s)	7th	–	–	6th	10th
2014–2015	1st place, gold medalist(s)	3rd place, bronze medalist(s)	8th	5th	2nd place, silver medalist(s)	6th
2015–2016	4th	1st place, gold medalist(s)	2nd place, silver medalist(s)	3rd place, bronze medalist(s)	3rd place, bronze medalist(s)	5th
2016–2017	1st(b)	2nd place, silver medalist(s)	–	1st place, gold medalist(s)	1st place, gold medalist(s)	1st place, gold medalist(s)
2017–2018	–	–	3rd place, bronze medalist(s)	–	–	–
2018–2019	2nd place, silver medalist(s)	1st place, gold medalist(s)	–	5th	–	1st place, gold medalist(s)
2019–2020	1st place, gold medalist(s)	2nd place, silver medalist(s)	3rd place, bronze medalist(s)	–	1st place, gold medalist(s)	
2020–2021	3rd place, bronze medalist(s)	2nd place, silver medalist(s)				
2021–2022	6th	7th	11th	–	1st place, gold medalist(s)	
2022–2023	–	2nd place, silver medalist(s)	3rd place, bronze medalist(s)	1st place, gold medalist(s)	1st place, gold medalist(s)	2nd place, silver medalist(s)

Season	Team sprint			
2009–2010				
2010–2011				
2011–2012				
2012–2013				
2013–2014				
2014–2015				
2015–2016				
2016–2017				
2017–2018				
2018–2019				
2019–2020	1st place, gold medalist(s)	1st place, gold medalist(s)	–	–
2020–2021				
2021–2022				
2022–2023				

– = Did not participate
(b) = Division B
DQ = Disqualified
NC = No classification

== Medals won ==
Championship	Gold (gold)	Silver (silver)	Bronze (bronze)
Dutch Single Distances	8	5	2
Dutch Sprint	1	3	4
European Sprint	2	1	1
European Single Distances	1	1	0
World Sprint	9	2	3
World Single Distance	4	5	3
Olympic Games	3	0	1
World Cup	36	29	25
