= Joo Hyong-jun =

South Korean speed skater

Joo Hyong-Jun
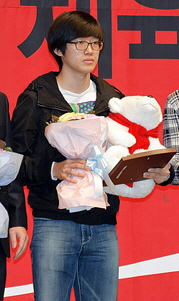

Personal information
- Born: 22 April 1991 (age 35) Seoul, South Korea
- Height: 175 cm (5 ft 9 in)
- Weight: 73 kg (161 lb)

Sport
- Country: South Korea
- Sport: Speed skating Short track speed skating
Medal record
Representing South Korea
Men's speed skating
Olympic Games
Silver medal – second place	2014 Sochi	Team pursuit
World Championships
Silver medal – second place	2013 Sochi	Team pursuit
Winter Universiade
Gold medal – first place	2013 Trentino	Team pursuit
Bronze medal – third place	2013 Trentino	1500 m
Men's short track speed skating
World Junior Championships
Gold medal – first place	2010 Taipei	Relay

- Joo Hyong-jun
- Hangul: 주형준
- Hanja: 朱炯俊
- RR: Ju Hyeongjun
- MR: Chu Hyŏngjun

Joo Hyong-jun (Korean: 주형준, Korean pronunciation: [tɕu.ɦjʌŋ.dʑun]; born 22 April 1991) is a South Korean speed skater.

== Career ==
=== Short track career ===
In 2010, Joo was selected for the South Korean junior national short track speed skating team and won the gold medal in the men's 3000 metre relay at the 2010 World Junior Short Track Speed Skating Championships held in Taipei, alongside Noh Jin-kyu and Park Se-yeong.

=== Long track career ===
In late 2010, Joo turned to long track speed skating. In November 2011, Joo was selected for the South Korean national team and had three podium finishes as a member of the South Korean team pursuit squad in the 2011–12 World Cup series. Joo captured silver in the team pursuit race at the 2013 World Single Distance Championships held in Sochi, alongside Olympic champion Lee Seung-hoon and Kim Cheol-min. Joo also achieved four podiums, including a silver in the mass start race, in the 2012–13 World Cup series.

==== 2014 Winter Olympics ====
At the 2014 Winter Olympics in Sochi, Russia, Joo first competed on February 15, 2014 in the 1500 metres. In the 1500 m, Joo finished 29th at 1:48.59.

The South Korean pursuit team for the 2014 Olympics consisted of Joo, Lee Seung-hoon and Kim Cheol-min. South Korea eliminated Russia in the quarterfinal, which advanced them to face reigning Olympic Champion Canada in the semifinal. South Korea then beat the Canadian team by 2.96 seconds, with a final time of 3:42.32. The South Korean team eventually won the silver medal, defeated by the Netherlands in the gold medal final by 3.14 seconds, with a final time of 3:40.85.

== Records ==
=== Personal records (long track) ===
Personal records
Men's speed skating
Event	Result	Date	Location	Notes
500 m	37.65	21 January 2013	(South Korea); Seoul	
1500 m	1:45.95	15 November 2013	(United States); Salt Lake City	
3000 m	3:51.39	29 September 2012	(Canada); Calgary	
5000 m	6:27.77	24 November 2012	(Russia); Kolomna	
10000 m	13:35.68	2 December 2012	(Kazakhstan); Astana	
