= Jonathan Kuck =

American speed skater

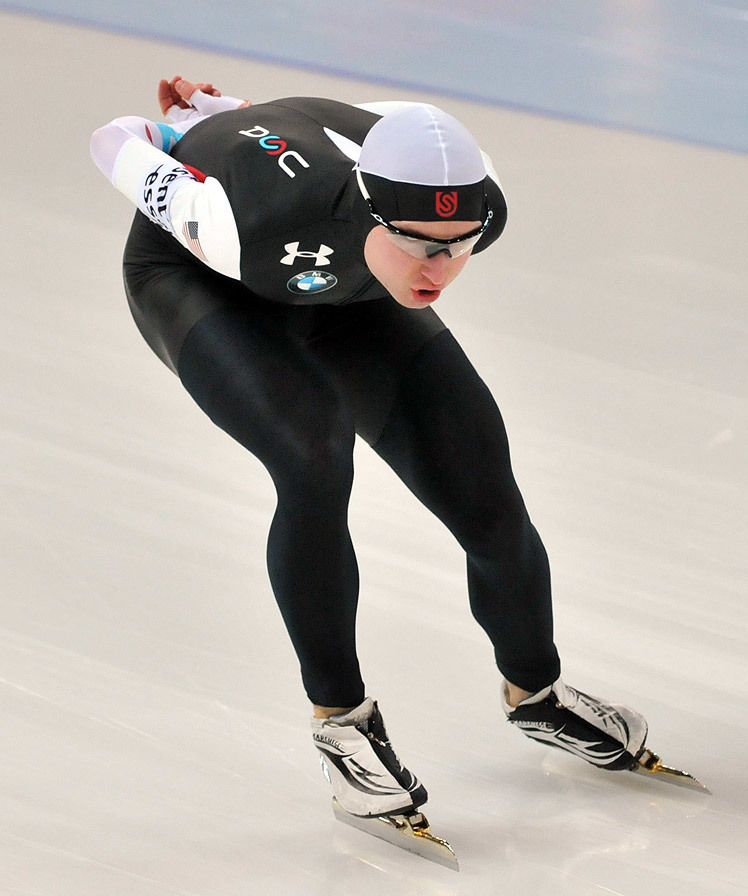
- Kuck at the World Allround Championships 2013 in Hamar

Personal information
- Born: March 14, 1990 (age 36) Urbana, Illinois
- Height: 6 ft 0 in (183 cm)
- Weight: 175 lb (79 kg)

Sport
- Country: United States
- Sport: Speed skating
Medal record
Men's speed skating
Representing the United States
Olympic Games
Silver medal – second place	2010 Vancouver	Team pursuit
World Allround Championships
Silver medal – second place	2010 Heerenveen	Allround
World Single Distance Championships
Gold medal – first place	2011 Inzell	Team pursuit
Silver medal – second place	2012 Heerenveen	Team pursuit
Bronze medal – third place	2012 Heerenveen	5000 m
Bronze medal – third place	2012 Heerenveen	10000 m
World Junior Championships
Silver medal – second place	2009 Zakopane	Allround

Jonathan Kuck (born March 14, 1990) is an American speed skater and silver medalist in the Winter Olympics.

At the 2010 Winter Olympics, Kuck won a silver medal in the team pursuit along with Brian Hansen and Chad Hedrick. Kuck has also won four medals at the World Championships, a silver medal at the World Allround Championships, and a silver medal at the World Junior Championships.

== Personal ==
Kuck started speed skating when he was ten and has competed internationally since 2008. He is an alum of Countryside School and University Laboratory High School. He obtained a Bachelor of Science from the University of Illinois at Urbana–Champaign, majoring in engineering physics with a minor in computer science. In 2020, he completed his PhD in Computer Science at Stanford University with a PhD Thesis titled, Fast Approximate Inference: Shifting the Pareto Frontier via Adaptation - advised by Stefano Ermon.

Kuck's research interests include combinatorial optimization, approximate probabilistic inference, combining probabilistic modeling with deep learning, graph neural networks and learning on irregular data (graphs, sets, and point clouds), robotic perception (object detection and tracking), and uncertainty quantification. Below is a list of his publications.

- Belief Propagation Neural Networks (Jonathan Kuck, Shuvam Chakraborty, Hao Tang, Rachel Luo, Jiaming Song, Ashish Sabharwal, Stefano Ermon) Neural Information Processing Systems (NeurIPS), 2020 (paper)
- Approximating the Permanent by Sampling from Adaptive Partitions (Jonathan Kuck, Tri Dao, Hamid Rezatofighi, Ashish Sabharwal, Stefano Ermon) Neural Information Processing Systems (NeurIPS), 2019 (paper)
- Adaptive Hashing for Model Counting (Jonathan Kuck, Tri Dao, Shenjia Zhao, Burak Bartan, Ashish Sabharwal, Stefano Ermon) Uncertainty in Artificial Intelligence (UAI), 2019 (paper)
- Approximate Inference via Weighted Rademacher Complexity (Jonathan Kuck, Ashish Sabharwal, Stefano Ermon) Conference on Artificial Intelligence (AAAI), 2018 (paper)
- Query-Based Outlier Detection in Heterogeneous Information Networks (Jonathan Kuck*, Honglei Zhuang*, Xifeng Yan, Hasan Cam, Jiawei Han) International Conference on Extending Database Technology (EDBT), 2015 (paper)

== Career ==
=== 2020 PhD Completion from Stanford University ===
After completing his PhD in Computer Science from Stanford, Kuck now works on combinatorial optimization, machine learning, and perception at Dexterity.

=== 2014 Winter Olympics ===
==== Trials ====
On December 27, 2013, Kuck won the Men's 5000-meters by more than 6 seconds at the U.S. Olympic Speedskating Trials in Utah to earn a spot on the U.S. Olympic team competing in Sochi in February.

=== 2010 Winter Olympics ===
==== Games ====
In the 10000 m, Kuck placed 8th with a time of 13:31.78. He was the highest American finish.

The American pursuit team consisted of Kuck, Chad Hedrick, Brian Hansen, and Trevor Marsicano. Kuck, Hedrick, and Marsicano eliminated Japan in the quarterfinal, which advanced them to face the heavily favored Netherlands in the semifinal. Kuck, Hedrick, and Hansen then beat the Dutch team by .4 seconds, with a final time of 3:42.71.

The American team were defeated by the Canadians in the gold medal final. The same trio that skated the semifinal trailed Canada in the gold medal final by as much as 0.73 seconds early in the race, trimming that margin to 0.21 at the finish with a time of 3:41.58. The Canadians hit the line at 3:41.37 to win the gold medal, leaving the American team with silver. The bronze went to the Netherlands, which set an Olympic record in the B final with a time of 3:39.95.

=== World Allround Championships ===
During the 2009- 2010 season, Kuck competed in the 1000m, 1500m 5/10,000m in World Cup events. Kuck won a silver medal at the 2010 World Allround Championships

During the 2010-11 season, Kuck consistently placed in the top 10 on the World Cup circuit. He capped the season with a World Championship title in the Team Pursuit. In November 2011, Kuck won the 3000m title at the U.S. Single Distance Championships.

Results

Season	Place	500m	5000m	1500m	10000m	points
09/10	2nd place, silver medalist(s)	36.31 (3)	6:23.47 (4)	1:45.36 (1)	13:15.62 (4)	149.558
10/11	5	35.97 (9)	6:17.88 (8)	1:43.12 (2)	13:11.24 (6)	147.693
11/12	6	36.90 (10)	6:27.15 (8)	1:48.41 (11)	13:30.88 (6)	152.295
12/13	13	37.41 (18)	6:27.62 (9)	1:48.44 (12)		112.318

=== World Junior Championships ===
Kuck was the 2008 and 2009 U.S. Junior Speedskating Champion and took second overall at the 2009 World Junior Speedskating Championships.

=== Personal bests ===
Event	Time	Date	Avg. speed	Location
500 m	35.97	Feb 12, 2011	30.64 mph (49.31 km/h)	Calgary
1000 m	1:09.25	Jan 4, 2011	31.89 mph (51.32 km/h)	Salt Lake City
1500 m	1:43.12	Feb 13, 2011	31.85 mph (51.26 km/h)	Calgary
3000 m	3:42.69†	Oct 8, 2011	29.64 mph (47.70 km/h)	Milwaukee
5000 m	6:16.28	Mar 23, 2012	29.28 mph (47.12 km/h)	Heerenveen
10000 m	13:11.24	Feb 13, 2011	28.34 mph (45.61 km/h)	Calgary
Team pursuit	3:41.58‡	Feb 27, 2010	30.37 mph (48.88 km/h)	Vancouver

Key: ‡ = National Record † = Track Record

Last updated March 2, 2010.
