= Mathieu Giroux =

Canadian speed skater

Personal information
- Born: 2 March 1986 (age 40) Montreal, Quebec
- Height: 180 cm (5 ft 11 in) (2014)
- Weight: 77 kg (170 lb) (2014)
- Spouse: Kirsti Lay (m. 2014)

Sport
- Country: Canada
- Sport: Speed skating
- Event: Long track
Medal record
Men's speed skating
Representing Canada
Olympic Games
Gold medal – first place	2010 Vancouver	Team pursuit
World Championships
Silver medal – second place	2011 Inzell	Team pursuit
- Updated on 7 February 2014

Mathieu Giroux (born 2 March 1986) is a Canadian speed-skater. He shared medals at team pursuit medals at world cup races in Calgary and Salt Lake City in 2009. He represented Canada at the 2010 Winter Olympics. On February 27, he won a gold medal in the team pursuit along with Denny Morrison and Lucas Makowsky.
