= Brian Hansen (speed skater) =

American speed skater (born 1990)

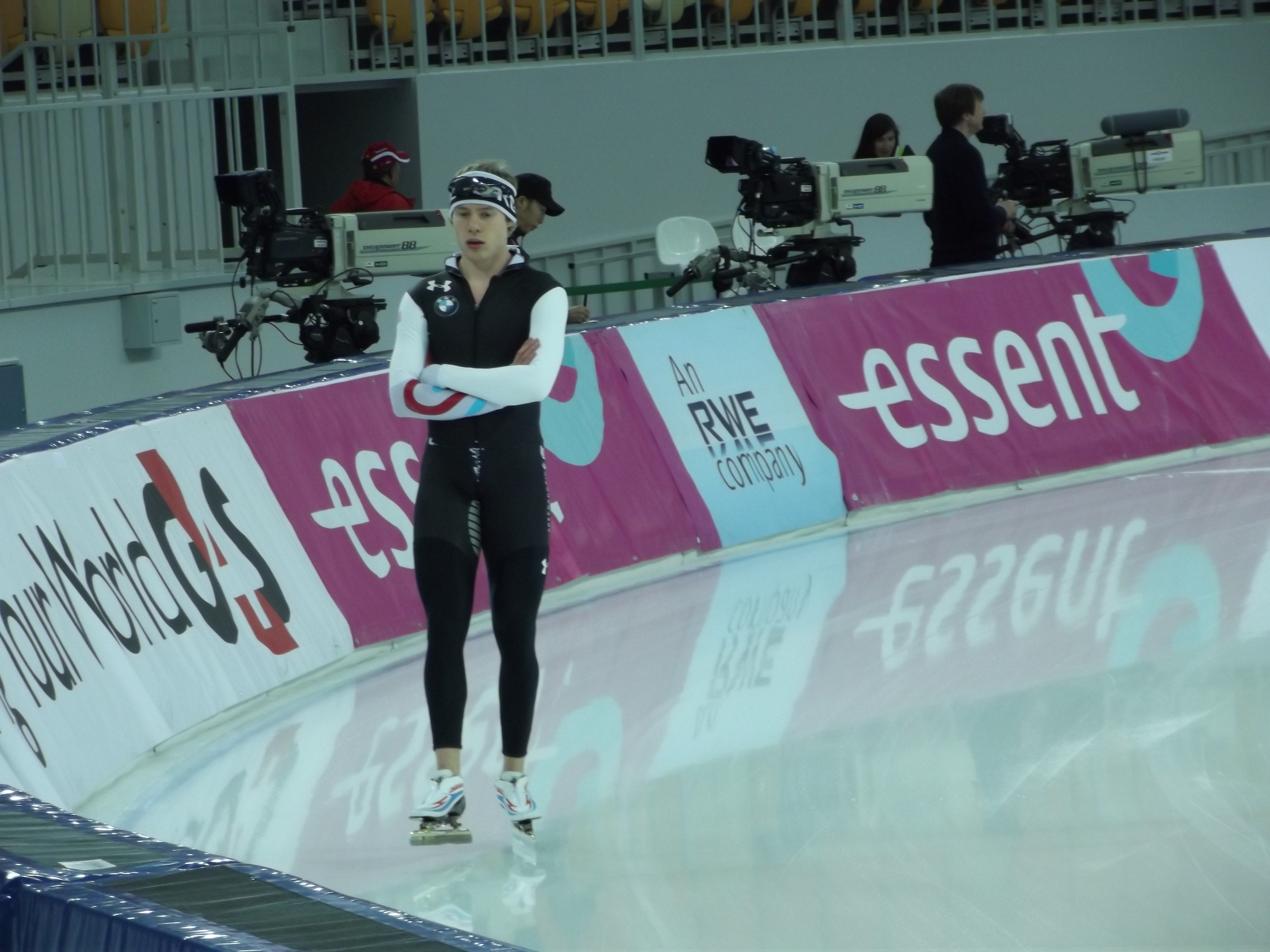
- Brian skating at the 2018 Olympic trials

Personal information
- Born: September 3, 1990 (age 35) Evanston, Illinois
- Height: 6 ft 0 in (183 cm)
- Weight: 165 lb (75 kg)

Sport
- Country: United States
- Sport: Speed skating
- Event: Long track speed skating
- Coached by: Nancy Swider-Peltz
Medal record
Men's speed skating
Representing the United States
Olympic Games
Silver medal – second place	2010 Vancouver	Team pursuit
World Single Distance Championships
Silver medal – second place	2012 Heerenveen	Team pursuit
Bronze medal – third place	2009 Vancouver	Team pursuit
World Junior Championships
Silver medal – second place	2010 Moscow	5000 m
Gold medal – first place	2010 Moscow	1500 m
Gold medal – first place	2010 Moscow	1000 m
Silver medal – second place	2010 Moscow	Allround
Silver medal – second place	2009 Zakopane	5000 m
Bronze medal – third place	2009 Zakopane	Allround

Brian Hansen (born September 3, 1990, in Evanston, Illinois) is an American speed skater and silver medalist in the Winter Olympics.

At the 2010 Winter Olympics, Hansen won a silver medal in the team pursuit along with Jonathan Kuck, Chad Hedrick and Trevor Marsicano. Hansen has also won a two medals in the World Single Distance Championships and four medals (two gold, three silver, one bronze) in the World Junior Championships. As of February 2018, Hansen holds the 13th position on the men's Adelskalender big combination.

== Career ==
=== 2018 Winter Olympics ===
Games

Hansen qualified for the 2018 U.S. Olympic Team in the 1500 m, Mass Start, and Team Pursuit. The Olympic Mass Start team event will have its debut in Pyeongchang, South Korea.

=== 2014 Winter Olympics ===
Games

Hansen placed 7th in the men's 1500 m and men's Team Pursuit. Hansen also placed 9th in the men's 1000 m.

=== 2010 Winter Olympics ===
==== Games ====
In the 1500 m, Hansen placed 18th with a time of 1:48.45.

The American pursuit team consisted of Hansen, Chad Hedrick, Jonathan Kuck and Trevor Marsicano. Kuck, Hedrick and Marsicano eliminated Japan in the quarterfinal, which advanced them to face the heavily favored Netherlands in the semifinal. Kuck, Hedrick and Hansen then beat the Dutch team by 0.4 seconds, with a final time of 3:42.71.

The American team were defeated by the Canadians in the gold medal final. The same trio that skated the semifinal trailed Canada in the gold medal final by as much as 0.73 seconds early in the race, trimming that margin to 0.21 at the finish with a time of 3:41.58.

== Other career highlights ==
- Nine-time World Cup individual medalist (2 gold, 1 silver, 6 bronze)
- Four-time World Cup Team Pursuit medalist (3 silver, 1 bronze)
- Member of the U.S. Long Track World Cup Team from 2009 to 2014 and 2016-2018

== Personal life ==
Brian was born in Evanston, Illinois, and was raised in Glenview, Illinois with his brother Steve. Hansen is coached by 4-time Olympian Nancy Swider-Peltz. Brian attended Glenbrook South High School in Glenview. After his participation at the 2014 Winter Olympics in Sochi, Brian took two years off to earn his bachelor's degree in business at the University of Colorado Boulder in Boulder, Colorado.

== Personal bests - February 2018 ==
Event	Time	Date	Location
500 m	34.87	December 28, 2013	(United States) Salt Lake City
1000 m	1:07.03	November 16, 2013	(United States) Salt Lake City
1500 m	1:42.16	November 15, 2013	(United States) Salt Lake City
3000 m	3:41.21	October 7, 2017	(United States) Salt Lake City
5000 m	6:17.84	November 10, 2013	(Canada) Calgary
10000 m	13:19.60	March 18, 2017	(Canada) Calgary
