= Benjamin Macé =

French speed skater (born 1989)

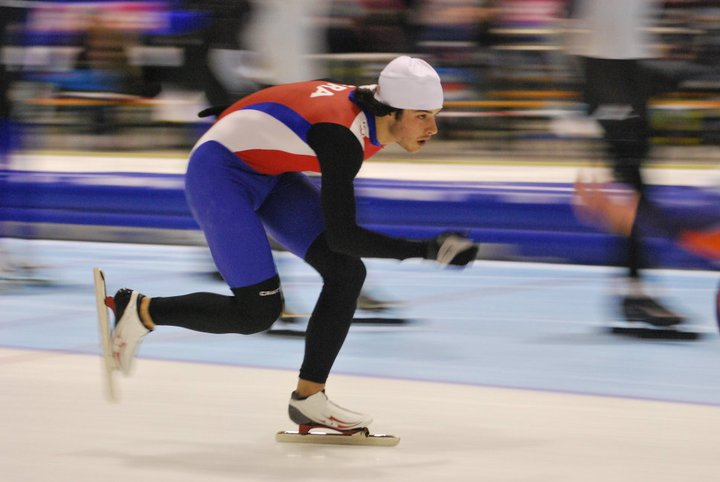

Personal information
- Born: 16 May 1989 (age 37) Bordeaux, France
- Height: 183 cm (6 ft 0 in)
- Weight: 78 kg (172 lb)

Sport
- Country: France
- Sport: Speed skating

Achievements and titles
- Olympic finals: 1
- Highest world ranking: 13 (1500 m) world cup 2013

Benjamin Macé (born 16 May 1989 in Bordeaux), also known as "Benj", is a French speed skater and short track speed skater. He competed in short track speed skating at the 2010 Winter Olympics and speed skating at the 2014 Winter Olympics.

His fascination with speed skating started serendipitously, while on a roller-skate outing with his brother and father, at a young age of six at the Gujan-Mestras Club. The three of them were amazed with the sight of "in-line skate" and then Mace joined Roller Skating Dijon Bourgogne Club. This acquainted him with the ice short track rink along with the short trackers, who used to join them during the latter summer trainings. The simple fun created by ice hockey games organized by the short trackers during Wednesday night, built good feeling with the newfound team and influenced him to join the ice trainings. The newfound adrenaline rush in speed skating immediately pushed aside the roller skating thrills.

In 2006 the epiphany of his Olympic dream set out after watching in TV the Turin Winter Olympics. This motivated him and above all etched an objective that of participating in the Olympics of Vancouver 2010. For which he described this ordeal as the toughest on his short track career due to his job in a local food chain (McDonald's) while having his intensive Olympic training yet eventually secured a spot in the Vancouver winter games.

His short track career didn't last very long and later switch to long track due to an incident in 2012 wherein the Korean team was almost winning until an accident happened during the passing of an opponent, reminding him of how a random mistake in short track can jeopardize your four years of training and also realized that his "build" is more that of a long tracker. <interview with OLS roller-skating magazine 20 March 2012>

As of 2013, Macé's best World Cup performance were: fifth in the Team Pursuit 2013 Salt and 13th in the 1500m in Salt Lake City, Utah, USA. < Sochi Olympic Athlete data>

In October 2017 he participated in Secret Story 11 in France. He enters the house on Day 42.
