= Denny Morrison =

Canadian speed skater (born 1985)

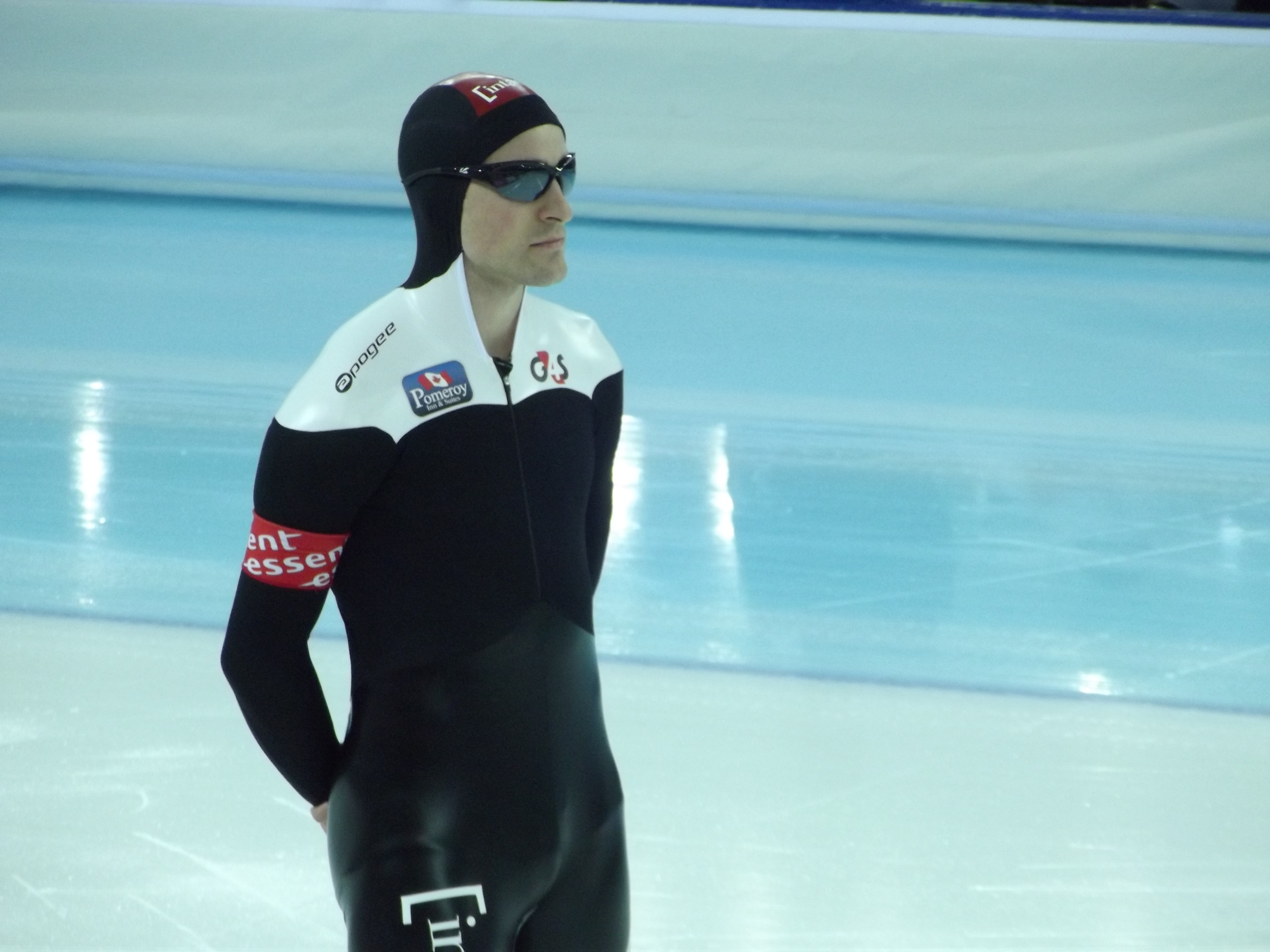
- Morrison at the 2013 World Single Distance Championships in Sochi.

Personal information
- Born: September 8, 1985 (age 41) Chetwynd, British Columbia, Canada
- Height: 1.83 m (6 ft 0 in)
- Weight: 80 kg (176 lb)
- Spouse: Josie Morrison (m. 2017)

Sport
- Country: Canada
- Sport: Speed skating
Medal record
Men's speed skating
Representing Canada
Olympic Games
Gold medal – first place	2010 Vancouver	Team pursuit
Silver medal – second place	2006 Turin	Team pursuit
Silver medal – second place	2014 Sochi	1000 m
Bronze medal – third place	2014 Sochi	1500 m
World Single Distance Championships
Gold medal – first place	2008 Nagano	1500 m
Gold medal – first place	2012 Heerenveen	1500 m
Silver medal – second place	2007 Salt Lake City	1000 m
Silver medal – second place	2007 Salt Lake City	Team pursuit
Silver medal – second place	2009 Vancouver	1000 m
Silver medal – second place	2011 Inzell	Team pursuit
Silver medal – second place	2015 Heerenveen	1500 m
Silver medal – second place	2015 Heerenveen	Team pursuit
Bronze medal – third place	2007 Salt Lake City	1500 m
Bronze medal – third place	2008 Nagano	1000 m
Bronze medal – third place	2009 Vancouver	1500 m

Denny Morrison (born September 8, 1985) is a Canadian speedskater from Fort St. John, British Columbia. He is an Olympic champion as a member of Canada's men's team pursuit, an event which he also won silver in at the 2006 Winter Olympics. Morrison won his first individual Olympic medal in Sochi when he won a silver in the men's 1000 m after teammate Gilmore Junio selflessly gave up his spot in order for Morrison, who fell at the national qualification event, failed to originally qualify. He won a second individual medal at those games, a bronze in the 1500 m. With four total Olympic medals, Morrison shares the record for the most medals of any Canadian male long track speed skaters along with Gaétan Boucher.

Primarily a middle distance skater in the 1000 and 1500 m events, he held the world record time of 1:42.01 from March 14, 2008, to March 6, 2009, in the 1500 m. The time is still the Canadian record for the distance.

Morrison finished in 4th place in the Junior World Allround Championships in 2004 and 2005, and a 5th place in his first senior World Allround in 2006. He has also won twelve medals at the World Championships, with two gold, six silver, and four bronze medals to his name. Morrison once held the 9th place on the allround best -ever Adelskalender.

== Career ==
At the 2006 Winter Olympics, Morrison won a silver medal as part of the Canadian men's speed skating pursuit team. Individually, Morrison won a silver in the 1500 m and a bronze in the 1000 m at a World Cup event in Turin in 2005–06. In 2007, Morrison won gold in the 1000 metre event in Calgary in the World Cup finals with a time of 1:07:24. He set a Canadian record, bettering his idol, Jeremy Wotherspoon. In that same weekend, Morrison also won a bronze in the 1500 metre event.

Morrison also participated in the 2007 World Single Distance Championships, and achieved good results, winning three medals, bronze in the 1500 m and silver in the 1000 m, losing both times to Shani Davis. In the team pursuit event he, along with Arne Dankers and Justin Warsylewicz, set an early best time, which broke the old team pursuit world record (previously held by Morrison, Dankers and Steven Elm), but the Dutch team of Sven Kramer, Erben Wennemars and Carl Verheijen would go on to beat the time set by Canada by five-tenths of a second, relegating Canada to 2nd place.

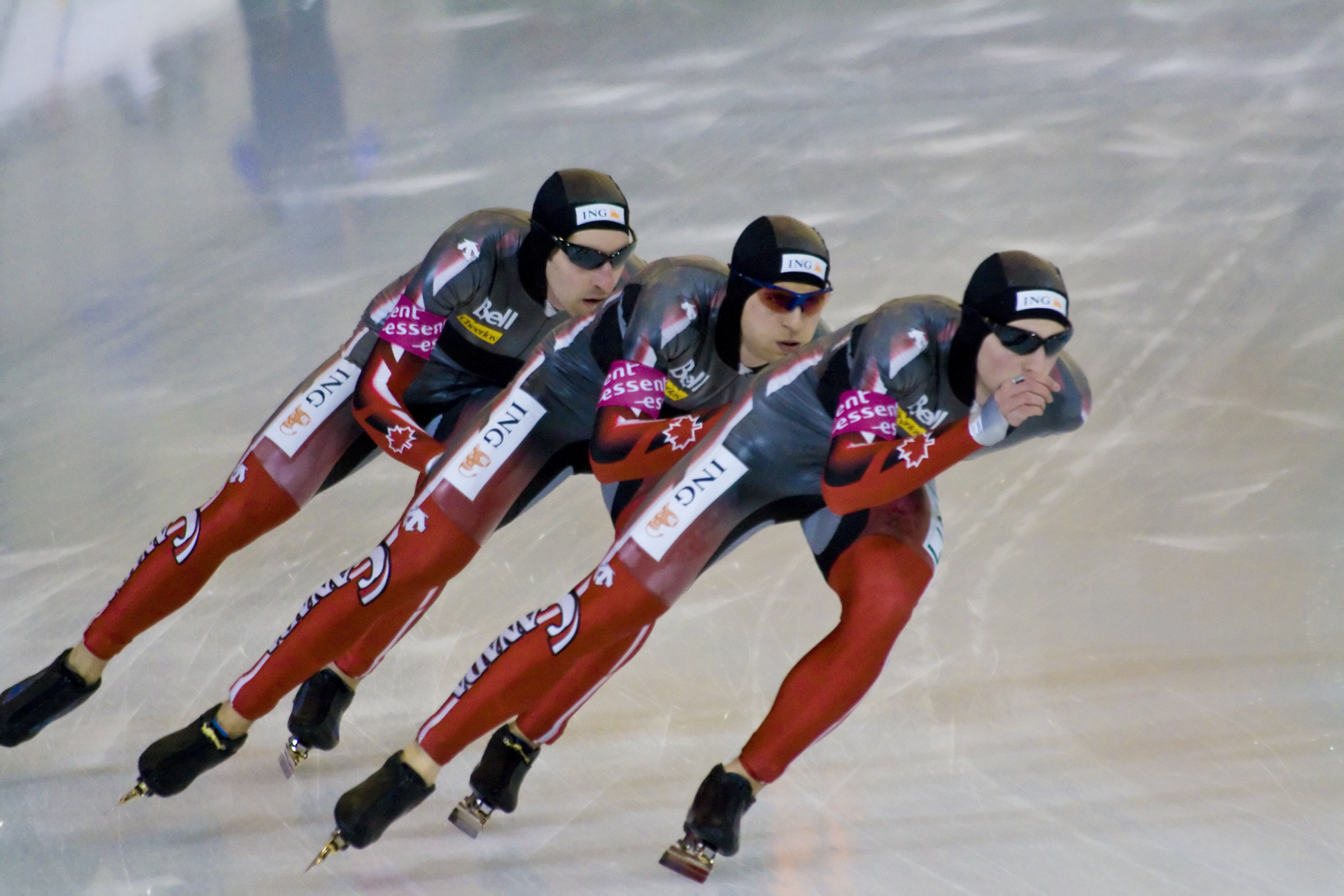
Denny Morrison (far right) competes in the team pursuit with Lucas Makowski and Jay Morrison at the 2009 World Single Distance Championships.

In 2008 Morrison topped his result from the year before at the World Single Distance Championships in Nagano, Japan. He took the bronze medal in the 1000 meters, but won the 1500 m and took home the gold medal. A week later, at the ING Finale at the Olympic Oval in Calgary, he set a new world record in the 1500 meters in a time of 1:42.01, beating the old record held by both Shani Davis and Erben Wennemars.

He competed at the 2010 Winter Olympics in Vancouver where he went in as a strong medal favourite in all three of his competitive events. Despite competing on home ice Morrison was unable to win an individual medal, his best finish was a ninth in the 1500 m. He did find the medal podium though when he won a gold medal in the team pursuit along with Lucas Makowsky and Mathieu Giroux. After the Olympics, Morrison considered retirement with some time away from summer training. Eventually he re-joined the World Cup circuit and eventually finished the season winning silver at the 2011 WSD Championships, with his team pursuit team. Re-motivated for 2012, he finished the season by winning his second World Championship title, again in the 1500 m. Morrison's 2013 season was off to a great start with an initial win at the first World Cup in Heerenveen, Netherlands, and finished the fall World Cup circuit leading the 1000 m points total so far. Morrison then injured himself while training in Fernie, British Columbia, breaking his tibia. At the time he was the leader of the 2012–13 ISU Speed Skating World Cup.

=== 2014 Winter Olympics ===
Having to come back from injury, Morrison qualified for the men's 1500 m at the Canadian trials for the Sochi Olympics. In the 1000 m disaster struck when he fell meaning he was unable to qualify for one of his best events. Though Morrison had two team pursuit medals to his name, he had yet to achieve an individual medal, a medal which he felt was missing from his collection. Gilmore Junio, a fellow athlete, relinquished his spot in order for Morrison to skate the event at the Olympics just days before the event was to take place. At the 2014 Winter Olympics Morrison won silver in the 1000 m trailing the eventual winner Stefan Groothuis by 4/100ths of a second. After the race Morrison made sure to first thank Junio "I have to thank my teammate Gilmore Junio because without him none of this would have been possible." He later added, "Props to my entire support team, and not just my teammates – Gilmore, huge move, definitely – but the therapists, the coaches, the team leader, everyone had a part in this medal and I'm so happy to share with all my entire team."

Following his silver medal performance, Morrison competed in his originally scheduled 1500 m event. Skating in the 15th pair of twenty he took over the lead until later pairings of Poland's Zbigniew Bródka took over the lead. Bródka would eventually end in a photo finish tie with Koen Verweij which would push Morrison into third and the bronze medal position. This gave Morrison his fourth ever Olympic medal, equaling Gaétan Boucher for the most medals by a Canadian male long track speed skater.

=== Post-Sochi ===
The 2015 World Single Distance Speed Skating Championships meant more success for Morrison where he won two silver medals, an individual in the 1,500 m and a second in the team pursuit with Ted-Jan Bloemen and Jordan Belchos. Morrison said of the team's silver that "With (Bloemen) coming over this summer, it was a new team, we had to communicate, find out what our flaws were, and work on them. We eventually created better results... And today, it all came together. This is just the beginning for us, on the road to the 2018 Olympics.".

Morrison suffered a fractured femur in a motorcycle accident in May 2015 leaving him with a steel rod permanently implanted in his leg and unable to recall where he was or how he had gotten there. Just eleven months after the accident Morrison again befell misfortune when he announced in late April 2016 that he had suffered a stroke in Utah during a 20-day bicycle ride from Arizona to Utah.

=== 2018 Winter Olympics ===
Morrison qualified to compete for Canada at the 2018 Winter Olympics.

== Sponsorships ==
Though Morrison had many short term sponsors leading into his home Olympics, he was aligned primarily with DNOW since 2007. DNOW and his other sponsor, Pomeroy Hotel Group both failed to sign a renewal sponsorship past 2015 after Morrison was badly injured in a motorcycle crash. He worked with Nike from 2008 to 2013, B2Ten from 2006 to 2009, was a CAN Fund recipient in 2009 and 2014, 2018, and a recipient of the Investors Group Athlete Grant in 2008 and 2009. Morrison’s long comeback from the 2015 motorcycle crash (and resulting stroke in 2016) were backed by InjaNation and Mawer, who sponsored Morrison through his 4th Olympics in 2018, and until the end of his career at the conclusion of the 2018/2019 season

== Personal life ==
Morrison is married to fellow speed skater Josie Spence. He survived a debilitating stroke at age 30 following a motorcycle crash a year earlier, and recovered to compete at his fourth Olympics in Korea, 2018. Denny returned to The University of Calgary to complete BSc Psychology with distinction, and First Class Honours BSc Anthropology, before being accepted into The University of Alberta’s Medical program in 2022.

== Records ==
=== Personal records ===
Personal records
Men's speed skating
Event	Result	Date	Location	Notes
500 m	34.85	December 28, 2007	Olympic Oval, Calgary	
1000 m	1:07.11	March 7, 2009	Utah Olympic Oval, Salt Lake City	
1500 m	1:42.01	March 14, 2008	Olympic Oval, Calgary	World record until broken by Shani Davis on March 6, 2009. Still Canadian record.
3000 m	3:40.44	September 23, 2017	Olympic Oval, Calgary	
5000 m	6:19.91	December 1, 2017	Olympic Oval, Calgary	
10000 m	13:41.65	December 31, 2007	Olympic Oval, Calgary	
Team Pursuit	3:36.44	December 8, 2017	Utah Olympic Oval, Salt Lake City	Canadian record with Benjamin Donnelly and Ted-Jan Bloemen

=== World records ===
Event	Time	Date	Venue
Team pursuit	3:39.69	November 12, 2005	Olympic Oval, Calgary
Team pursuit	3:38.31	March 11, 2007	Utah Olympic Oval, Salt Lake City
1500 m	1:42.01	March 14, 2008	Olympic Oval, Calgary

Source: SpeedSkatingStats.com
