= Denis Kuzin =

Kazakhstani speed skater (born 1989)

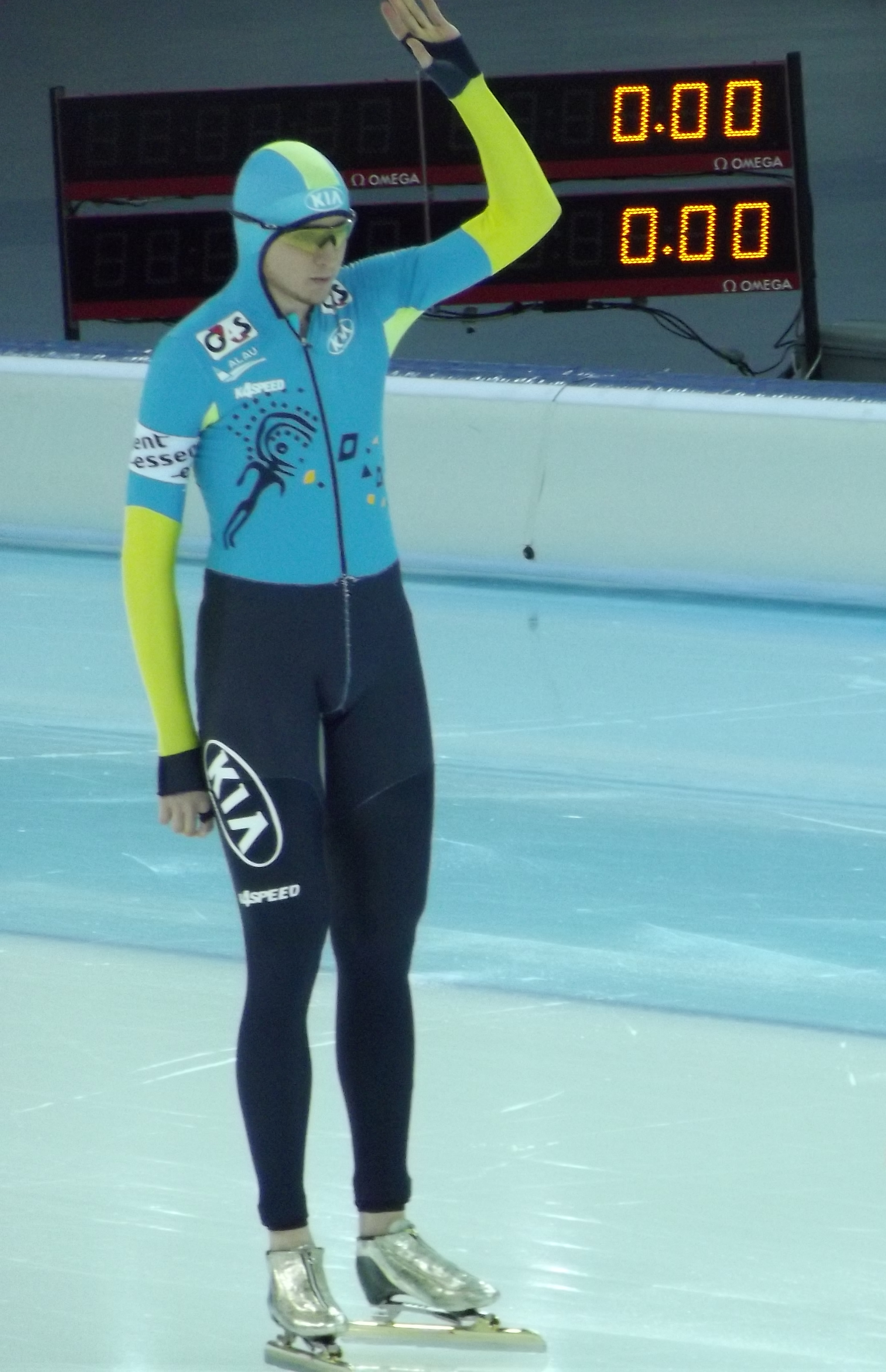
- Kuzin during the 2013 World Single Distance Speed Skating Championships in Sochi

Personal information
- Born: 4 December 1989 (age 36) Kostanay, Kazakh SSR, USSR
- Height: 1.84 m (6 ft 0 in)
- Weight: 80 kg (176 lb)

Sport
- Country: Kazakhstan
- Sport: Speed skating
Medal record
Men's speed skating
Representing Kazakhstan
World Single Distance Championships
Gold medal – first place	2013 Sochi	1000 m
Asian Winter Games
Gold medal – first place	2011 Astana-Almaty	1500 m

Denis Valerievich Kuzin (Russian: Денис Валерьевич Кузин; born 4 December 1989) is a world champion speed skater from Kazakhstan.

In the 2013 World Single Distance Championships he won the gold medal in the 1000 meters race.

== Personal records ==
Distance	Time	Location	Arena	Date
500 m	35.58	Calgary	Olympic Oval	29 January 2012
1000 m	1:07.71	Calgary	Olympic Oval	9 November 2013
1500 m	1:43.60	Salt Lake City	Utah Olympic Oval	15 November 2013
3000 m	3:54.90	Calgary	Olympic Oval	29 September 2012
5000 m	7:03.97	Chelyabinsk	Uralskaya Molniya	24 December 2008
10000 m	14:29.49	Chelyabinsk	Uralskaya Molniya	31 March 2009
