= Konrad Niedźwiedzki =

Polish speed skater

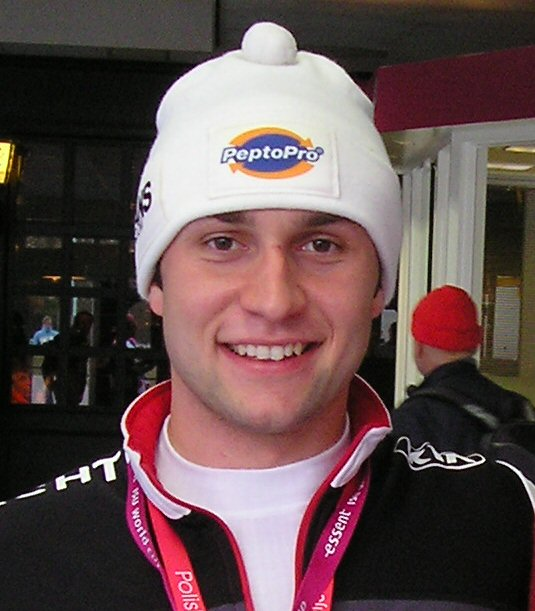

Personal information
- Born: 2 January 1985 (age 41) Warsaw, Poland
- Height: 1.80 m (5 ft 11 in)
- Weight: 80 kg (176 lb)
- Life partner: Katarzyna Woźniak

Sport
- Country: Poland
- Sport: Speed skating
- Coached by: Krzysztof Niedźwiedzki
Medal record
Men's speed skating
Event	1st	2nd	3rd
Olympic Games	0	0	1
World Championships	0	0	1
Universiade	1	2	0
Total	1	2	2
Olympic Games
Bronze medal – third place	2014 Sochi	Team pursuit
World Championships
Bronze medal – third place	2013 Sochi	Team pursuit
Universiade
Gold medal – first place	2009 Harbin	Team pursuit
Silver medal – second place	2009 Harbin	1000 m
Silver medal – second place	2009 Harbin	1500 m
Bronze medal – third place	2007 Turin	Team pursuit
- Updated on 22 February 2014

Konrad Łukasz Niedźwiedzki (Polish pronunciation: [ˈkɔnɾat ɲɛd͡ʑˈvʲjɛt͡ski]; born 2 January 1985) is a Polish long track speed skater who participates in international competitions.

== Personal life ==
Konrad Niedźwiedzki was born in Warsaw, Poland. His father Krzysztof is coach of Polish national speed skating team. Konrad dated with Katarzyna Woźniak also speed skater.

== Olympic Games ==
In the 2013 World Single Distance Championships in Sochi, Russia, Niedźwiedzki won the bronze medal in the men's team pursuit together with Zbigniew Bródka and Jan Szymański. The same result was reached at the 2014 Winter Olympics which was held at the same venue.

== Personal records ==
Personal records
Men's speed skating
Event	Result	Date	Location	Notes
500 m	35.29	4 December 2009	Olympic Oval, Calgary	
1000 m	1:07.90	16 November 2013	Utah Olympic Oval, Salt Lake City	
1500 m	1:43.12	15 November 2013	Utah Olympic Oval, Salt Lake City	
3000 m	3:41.11	25 January 2014	Eisstadion Inzell, Inzell	Current Polish record
5000 m	6:25.62	17 November 2013	Utah Olympic Oval, Salt Lake City	
10000 m	13:45.13	13 January 2013	Thialf, Heerenveen	

== Career highlights ==
Olympic Winter Games
2006 – Turin, 13th at 1000 m
2006 – Turin, 12th at 1500 m
World Allround Championships
2006 – Calgary, 8th
World Single Distance Championships
2005 – Inzell, 14th at 1500 m
European Allround Championships
2005 – Heerenveen, 22nd
2006 – Hamar, 14th
2007 – Collalbo, 13th
2008 – Kolomna, 13th
World Cup
2004 – Hamar, 3rd (bronze) at team pursuit
2005 – Baselga di Pinè, 3rd (bronze) at team pursuit
World Junior Allround Championships
2001 – Groningen, 34th
2002 – Collalbo, 12th
2004 – Roseville, 13th
National Championships
2003 – Warsaw, (bronze) 3rd at 1500 m
2004 – Tomaszów Mazowiecki, (silver) 2nd at 1500 m
2004 – Tomaszów Mazowiecki, (bronze) 3rd at 1000 m
2004 – Sanok, (silver) 2nd at sprint
2007 – Warsaw, (bronze) 3rd at 500 m
2007 – Warsaw, (bronze) 3rd at 5000 m
2007 – Warsaw, (gold) 1st at 1500 m
2007 – Warsaw, (gold) 1st at 1000 m
Nordic Junior Games
2004 – Berlin, (gold) 1st at 1500 m
2004 – Berlin, (bronze) 3rd at 3000 m
2004 – Berlin, (gold) 1st at 1000 m

Olympic Games
Preceded by Paulina Ligocka	Flagbearer for Poland; Vancouver 2010	Succeeded by Dawid Kupczyk
