= Zbigniew Bródka =

Polish speed skater (born 1984)

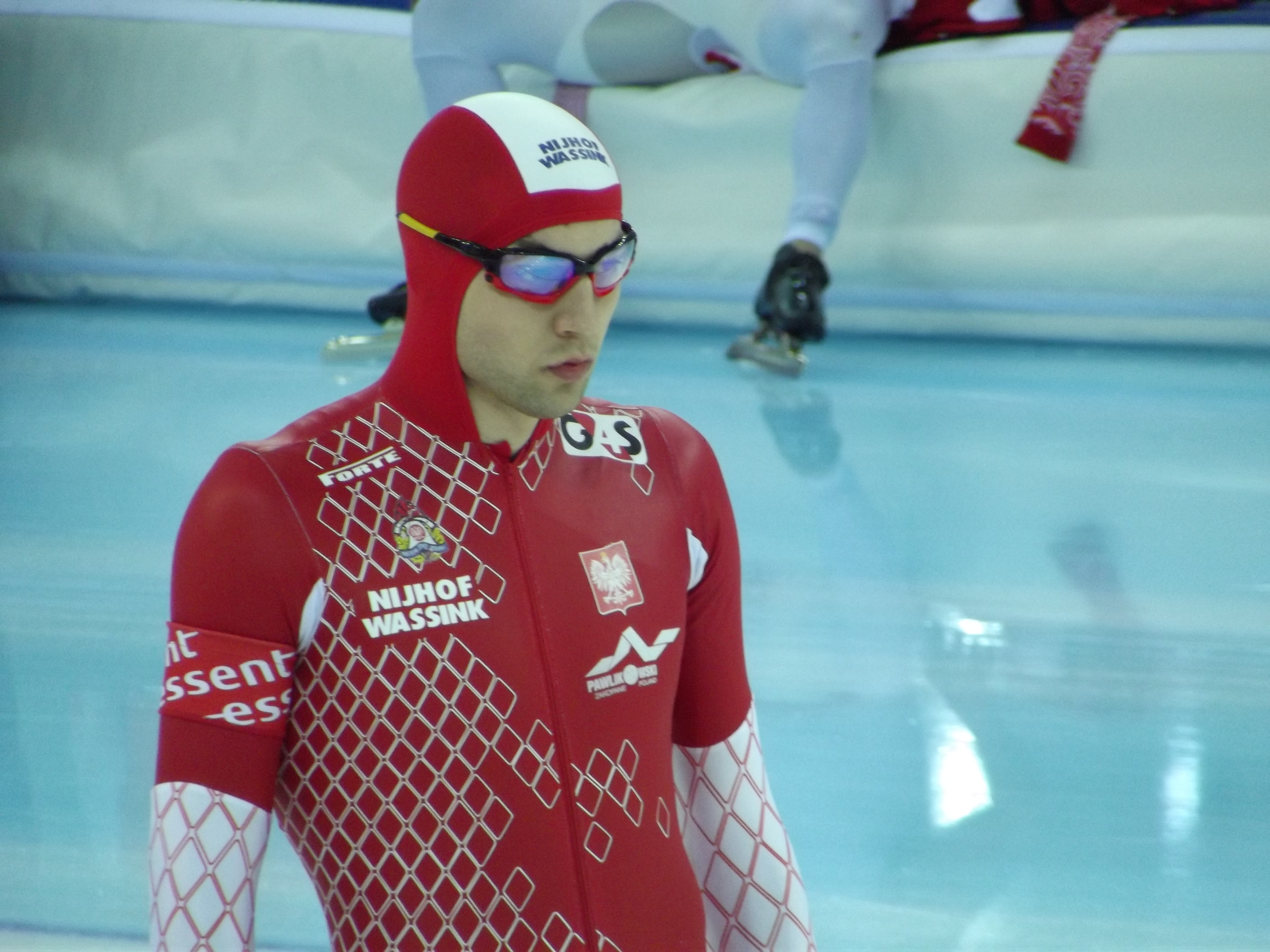
- Bródka in 2013

Personal information
- Born: 8 October 1984 (age 41) Głowno, Łódź Voivodeship, Poland
- Height: 1.83 m (6 ft 0 in)
- Weight: 84 kg (185 lb)

Sport
- Country: Poland
- Sport: Speed skating
- Club: UKS Błyskawica Domaniewice
- Coached by: Krzysztof Niedźwiedzki
Medal record
Men's speed skating
Event	1st	2nd	3rd
Olympic Games	1	0	1
World Championships	0	0	1
European Championships	0	0	1
Total	1	0	3
Olympic Games
Gold medal – first place	2014 Sochi	1500 m
Bronze medal – third place	2014 Sochi	Team pursuit
World Championships
Bronze medal – third place	2013 Sochi	Team pursuit
European Championships
Bronze medal – third place	2018 Kolomna	Team pursuit

Zbigniew Marcin Bródka (Polish pronunciation: [ˈzbiɡɲɛv ˈbrutka]; born 8 October 1984) is a Polish speed skater and a 2014 Olympic champion in 1500 metres. He also works as a firefighter in the State Fire Service station in Łowicz.

== Personal life ==
Bródka was born in Głowno, Poland, on 8 October 1984. Since 2009, he has worked as a firefighter in the State Fire Service (Polish: Państwowa Straż Pożarna) station in Łowicz. He represents a local sports club, UKS Błyskawica Domaniewice. He is married to Agnieszka and has two daughters - Gabriela and Amelia.

== Competitive career ==
Before becoming a long track speed skater, Bródka competed in middle-distance running and short track. He often trains in Germany, as Poland lacks appropriate facilities for long track speed skating. When he trains in Poland, Bródka is forced to improvise, including using roller skates to imitate ice skating movements. In 2006, an accident prevented him from participating in the 2006 Winter Olympics. In 2010, he made his Olympic debut in Vancouver, finishing 27th in the men's 1500 metres. In the following years, he took part in several Polish and European championships, placing well and winning several competitions (a total of five gold medals until 2014) in Poland.

At the 2013 World Single Distance Championships, Bródka helped Poland capture the bronze medal in the men's team pursuit with teammates Jan Szymański and Konrad Niedźwiedzki. It was the first victory for Poland's male speed skaters in that discipline. In the 2012–13 season, he also won the men's 1500 metres World Cup, the first Polish speed skater to do so.

At the 2014 Winter Olympics in Sochi, he became the 2014 Olympic champion in 1500 metres, winning by only 0.003 sec. He is the first Pole to receive a gold medal in this discipline.

He won the bronze medal at the 2018 European Speed Skating Championships in the Team pursuit event in Kolomna with his teammates Jan Szymański and Adrian Wielgat.

He was chosen to be the flagbearer of the Polish team at the 2018 Winter Olympic Games in Pyeongchang, same as at the 2022 Winter Olympics in Beijing.

== Personal records ==
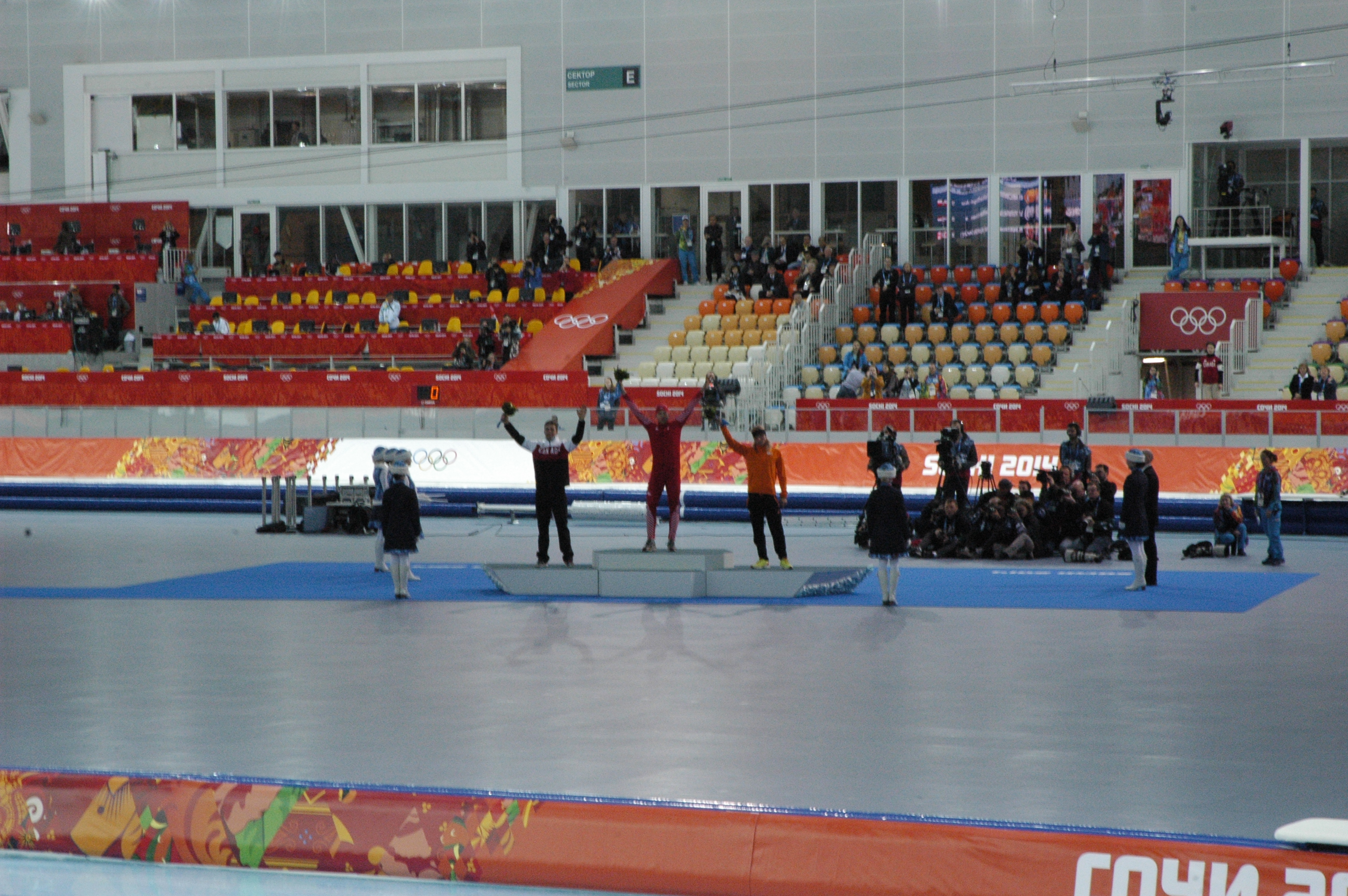
Zbigniew Bródka won gold in the 1500 at the Sochi Olympics.

Personal records
Men's speed skating
Event	Result	Date	Location	Notes
500 m	35.75	28 February 2015	Olympic Oval, Calgary	
1000 m	1:07.87	19 January 2013	Olympic Oval, Calgary	
1500 m	1:42.89	15 November 2013	Utah Olympic Oval, Salt Lake City	Current Polish record
3000 m	3:50.42	13 October 2012	Eisstadion Inzell, Inzell	
5000 m	6:27.79	7 March 2015	Olympic Oval, Calgary	
10000 m	14:07.99	31 October 2021	Tomaszów Mazowiecki	

Olympic Games
Preceded by Dawid Kupczyk	Flagbearer for Poland; Pyeongchang 2018 & Beijing 2022	Succeeded by incumbent
