= 2013–14 ISU Speed Skating World Cup =

International speed skating competition

ISU Speed Skating World Cup
- Dates: 8 November 2013 – 16 March 2014

The 2013–14 ISU Speed Skating World Cup, officially the Essent ISU World Cup Speed Skating 2013–2014, was a series of international speed skating competitions that ran the entire season. The season started on 8 November 2013 in Calgary, Alberta, Canada, and concluded with the final on 16 March 2014 in Heerenveen, Netherlands. Compared to previous seasons, there were fewer competition weekends; the season was restricted due to the 2014 Winter Olympics, which were arranged in Sochi, Russia, during February 2014. In total, six competition weekends were held at six different locations, twelve cups were contested (six for men, and six for women), and 72 races took place.

The World Cup is organized by the International Skating Union (ISU).

== Calendar ==
The detailed schedule for the season. Additionally, the team sprint was a demonstration event in Inzell.

WC #	City	Venue	Date	500 m	1000 m	1500 m	3000 m	5000 m	10000 m	Mass start	Team pursuit
1	(Canada) Calgary	Olympic Oval	8–10 November	2m, 2w	m, w	m, w	w	m			m, w
2	(United States) Salt Lake City	Utah Olympic Oval	15–17 November	2m, 2w	m, w	m, w	w	m			m, w
3	(Kazakhstan) Astana	Alau Ice Palace	29 November – 1 December	2m, 2w	m, w	m, w		w	m		
4	(Germany) Berlin	Sportforum Hohenschönhausen	6–8 December	2m, 2w	m, w	m, w	w	m			m, w
	(Norway) Hamar	Vikingskipet	11–12 January	2014 European Speed Skating Championships							
	(Japan) Nagano	M-Wave	18–19 January	2014 World Sprint Speed Skating Championships							
	(Russia) Sochi	Adler Arena	8–22 February	Speed skating at the 2014 Winter Olympics							
5	(Germany) Inzell	Eisstadion Inzell	7–9 March	2m, 2w	m, w	m, w	w	m		m, w	
6	(Netherlands) Heerenveen	Thialf	14–16 March	2m, 2w	m, w	m, w	w	m		m, w	m, w
	(Netherlands) Heerenveen	Thialf	21–23 March	2014 World Allround Speed Skating Championships							
Total				12m, 12w	6m, 6w	6m, 6w	5w	5m, 1w	1m	2m, 2w	4m, 4w

Note: the men's 5000 and 10000 metres were contested as one cup, and the women's 3000 and 5000 metres were contested as one cup, as indicated by the color coding.

== Entry rules ==
=== Qualification criteria ===
In order to qualify, skaters must have achieved the following results in ISU events, international competitions or national championships between 1 July 2012 and the entry deadline for the competition concerned.

Men
Distance	Time required ^{A}	Time required ^{B}
500 m	36.20	36.60
1000 m	1:11.90	1:12.80
1500 m	1:51.00	1:52.50
3000 m	—	—
5000 m	6:48.00	6:52.00
10000 m	13:40.00 ^{C}	13:50.00 ^{D}

Women
Distance	Time required ^{A}	Time required ^{B}
500 m	40.00	40.50
1000 m	1:20.00	1:21.00
1500 m	2:03.00	2:05.50
3000 m	4:24.00	4:28.00
5000 m	7:25.00 ^{E}	7:32.00 ^{F}
10000 m	—	—

^{A} in the Olympic Oval, Calgary, or the Utah Olympic Oval, Salt Lake City
^{B} in other ice rinks
^{C} or 6:35.00 on 5000 m
^{D} or 6:40.00 on 5000 m
^{E} or 4:15.00 on 3000 m
^{F} or 4:20.00 on 3000 m

For the mass start and team pursuit events, skaters who have achieved any one of the above results will qualify.

=== Nation quotas ===
Every ISU member nation may enter at least one competitor for each distance, subject to the qualification criteria above. Additionally, skaters placed among the top 36 in the final 2012–13 World Cup, or included in the final qualifying list (including the reserve list) of the 2013 World Single Distance Championships, for the distance category concerned, may be entered. Member nations not mentioned may enter maximum one skater for each distance.

Men
Nation	500 m	1000 m	1500 m	5k/10k
Australia	2	2	1	1
Austria	1	1	1	2
Belarus	1	1	1	1
Belgium	1	1	2	3
Canada	5	5	5	3
China	3	2	1	2
Czech Republic	1	1	1	1
Denmark	1	1	1	1
Finland	3	4	1	1
France	1	2	3	3
Germany	4	3	2	5
Italy	2	2	3	2
Japan	5	3	2	1
Kazakhstan	1	4	4	2
South Korea	5	4	2	5
Latvia	2	2	2	2
Netherlands	5	5	5	5
Norway	3	3	5	3
New Zealand	1	1	1	2
Poland	3	2	4	3
Russia	5	5	5	5
Sweden	1	1	2	1
Switzerland	1	1	1	2
United States	5	5	4	4

Women
Nation	500 m	1000 m	1500 m	3k/5k
Australia	1	1	1	1
Austria	1	1	1	2
Belarus	2	2	1	1
Belgium	1	1	2	2
Canada	5	5	5	5
China	5	5	2	1
Czech Republic	2	2	3	2
Denmark	1	1	1	2
Finland	2	1	1	1
France	1	1	1	1
Germany	5	5	3	5
Italy	3	3	1	1
Japan	5	5	5	5
Kazakhstan	2	2	2	1
South Korea	4	4	3	5
Latvia	1	1	1	1
Netherlands	5	5	5	5
Norway	1	1	4	4
New Zealand	1	1	1	1
Poland	1	2	4	4
Russia	5	5	5	5
Sweden	1	1	1	1
Switzerland	1	1	1	1
United States	5	5	4	3

For the mass start event, a member nation may enter maximum three skaters, all subject to the qualifying criteria above. For the team pursuit event, a member nation may enter one team only per category (men/women).

== Competition format ==
=== Seeding of skaters ===
If the number of entered skaters exceeds a certain limit, skaters compete in two separate divisions, A and B. In the first competition, the composition of skaters in the respective division is determined by the ranking of the skaters in the respective distance category from the 2012–13 World Cup and the seeding submitted by the respective team leaders before the draw. For each country and distance category, the number of skaters in the ranking top of the previous year will decide the number of places available in Division A, but the team leader's seeding will decide which skater goes into which division.

In the following competitions, the current World Cup ranking is used, with special considerations to top-placed skaters in Division B of the previous competition. A skater may also under certain conditions apply for a wild card for Division A, but only the first time the skater participates in a distance category, and not in the first and last competitions of the season. In the last competition for the season, there will be no Division B.

Number of competitors in Division A
	World Cup 1–5 number of entries				World Cup 6
Distance	up to 20	21 to 24	25 to 28	29 or more	
500 m 1000 m 1500 m	all	all	all	20	20
5000 m men 3000 m women	all	12	16	16	16
10000 m men 5000 m women	12	12	12	12	—
Mass start	all	all	16	20	20

=== Points system ===
==== Points tables ====
World Cup points for all competitions, except the last, are awarded in both divisions, using two sets of tables, A1/B1 and A2/B2. Tables A1 and B1 are used when the number of competitors in Division A exceeds 16, while tables A2 and B2 are used when that number is between 12 and 16. However, if table B1 was used for Division B in the first race in an event that is raced twice in the same competition, it will be used also in the second race, regardless of the number of competitors in Division A.

For the last competition, since there will be no Division B, points will be awarded using table A3.

Points system, tables A1/B1 (more than 16 entries in A)
Rank	Division A	Division B
1	100	25
2	80	19
3	70	15
4	60	11
5	50	8
6	45	6
7	40	4
8	36	2
9	32	1
10	28	—
11	24	
12	21	
13	18	
14	16	
15	14	
16	12	
17	10	
18	8	
19	6	
20	5	
21	4	
22	3	
23	2	
24	1	

Points system, tables A2/B2 (12–16 entries in A)
Rank	Division A	Division B
1	100	32
2	80	27
3	70	23
4	60	19
5	50	15
6	45	11
7	40	9
8	35	7
9	30	6
10	25	5
11	21	4
12	18	3
13	16	2
14	14	1
15	12	—
16	10	

Points system, table A3
Rank	Division A
1	150
2	120
3	105
4	90
5	75
6	45
7	40
8	36
9	32
10	28
11	24
12	21
13	18
14	16
15	14
16	12
17	10
18	8
19	6
20	5

==== Mass start ranking ====
The mass start races will be over 20 laps for men and 15 laps for women. There will be 3 intermediate sprints, at 5, 10 and 15 laps for men, and at 4, 8 and 12 laps for women. Race points will be awarded to the four first skaters at the intermediate sprints, and to the six first skaters at the final sprint. The accumulated points a skater collects during a race will decide the final ranking. For skaters who are tied in race points, including those who have failed to collect any, their finishing order will be break the tie.

Points table for mass start
Rank	Intermediate sprints	Final sprint (finish)
1	5	31
2	3	15
3	2	10
4	1	5
5	—	3
6		1

==== Grand World Cup ====
In order to determine an overall World Cup winner, one for men and one for women, a special points system is used, awarding points for the top five skaters in each individual event.

Points table for Grand World Cup
Rank	World Cup 1–5	World Cup 6
1	10	15
2	8	12
3	7	10,5
4	6	9
5	5	7,5

Note: half points are awarded in distances that are skated twice in the same competition.

=== Prize money ===
Prize money for each competition
Rank	Individual events	Mass start	Team pursuit
1	$1500	$750	$2100
2	$1000	$500	$1500
3	$800	$400	$1200

Note: half amounts are awarded in distances that are skated twice in the same competition.

Prize money for final ranking
Rank	Individual events	Mass start	Team pursuit
1	$15000	$5000	$5000
2	$10000	$3000	$3000
3	$7000	$2500	$2500
4	$5000	$2000	$2000
5	$4000	$1500	$1500
6	$3500	—	—
7	$3000		
8	$2500		
9	$2000		
10	$1500		

Additionally, the Grand World Cup winner of each category (men/women) is awarded $20000.

== World records ==
World records going into the 2013–14 season.

=== Men ===
Distance	Time	Holder(s)	Nat.	Date	Venue	Reference
500 m	34.03	Jeremy Wotherspoon	(Canada)	9 November 2007	Utah Olympic Oval, Salt Lake City	
1000 m	1:06.42	Shani Davis	(United States)	7 March 2009	Utah Olympic Oval, Salt Lake City	
1500 m	1:41.04	Shani Davis	(United States)	11 December 2009	Utah Olympic Oval, Salt Lake City	
5000 m	6:03.32	Sven Kramer	(Netherlands)	17 November 2007	Olympic Oval, Calgary	
10000 m	12:41.69	Sven Kramer	(Netherlands)	10 March 2007	Utah Olympic Oval, Salt Lake City	
Team pursuit (8 laps)	3:37.80	Sven Kramer; Carl Verheijen; Erben Wennemars	(Netherlands)	11 March 2007	Utah Olympic Oval, Salt Lake City	

On 9 November 2013, in the team pursuit race in Calgary, the Dutch team, comprised by Koen Verweij, Jan Blokhuijsen and Sven Kramer, broke the world record with a time of 3:37.17. The next weekend, on 16 November, the same skaters improved the record further, to 3:35.60.

=== Women ===
Distance	Time	Holder(s)	Nat.	Date	Venue	Reference
500 m	36.80	Lee Sang-hwa	(South Korea)	20 January 2013	Olympic Oval, Calgary	
1000 m	1:12.68	Christine Nesbitt	(Canada)	28 January 2012	Olympic Oval, Calgary	
1500 m	1:51.79	Cindy Klassen	(Canada)	20 November 2005	Utah Olympic Oval, Salt Lake City	
3000 m	3:53.34	Cindy Klassen	(Canada)	18 March 2006	Olympic Oval, Calgary	
5000 m	6:42.66	Martina Sáblíková	(Czech Republic)	18 February 2011	Utah Olympic Oval, Salt Lake City	
Team pursuit (6 laps)	2:55.79	Kristina Groves; Christine Nesbitt; Brittany Schussler	(Canada)	6 December 2009	Olympic Oval, Calgary	

On 9 November 2013, in the second 500 metres race in Calgary, Lee Sang-hwa of South Korea improved her own world record with a time of 36.74 seconds. The next weekend, in Salt Lake City, Lee broke the record twice. First, on Friday, she lowered the record to 36.57 seconds. On Saturday, she improved it another 21/100, to 36.36 seconds. On Sunday, 17 November, also in Salt Lake City, Brittany Bowe broke the world record on 1000 metres with a time of 1:12.58.

== Men's standings ==
=== 500 m ===
Rank	Name	Points
1	(Netherlands) Ronald Mulder	782
2	(Netherlands) Michel Mulder	728
3	(Netherlands) Jan Smeekens	655

=== 1000 m ===
Rank	Name	Points
1	(United States) Shani Davis	590
2	(Canada) Denny Morrison	344
3	(Netherlands) Kjeld Nuis	305

=== 1500 m ===
Rank	Name	Points
1	(Netherlands) Koen Verweij	440
2	(Russia) Denis Yuskov	430
3	(United States) Shani Davis	401

=== 5000 and 10000 m ===
Rank	Name	Points
1	(Netherlands) Jorrit Bergsma	500
2	(Germany) Patrick Beckert	311
3	(Netherlands) Sven Kramer	300

=== Mass start ===
Rank	Name	Points
1	(Netherlands) Bob de Vries	220
2	(Netherlands) Arjan Stroetinga	175
3	(Belgium) Bart Swings	170

=== Team pursuit ===
Rank	Country	Points
1	Netherlands	450
2	United States	280
3	Norway	270

=== Grand World Cup ===
Rank	Name	Points
1	(United States) Shani Davis	95,5
2	(Netherlands) Koen Verweij	67,5
3	(Netherlands) Jorrit Bergsma	50

== Women's standings ==
=== 500 m ===
Rank	Name	Points
1	(Russia) Olga Fatkulina	960
2	(United States) Heather Richardson	915
3	(Germany) Jenny Wolf	803

=== 1000 m ===
Rank	Name	Points
1	(United States) Heather Richardson	555
2	(United States) Brittany Bowe	500
3	(Russia) Olga Fatkulina	352

=== 1500 m ===
Rank	Name	Points
1	(Netherlands) Ireen Wüst	530
2	(Netherlands) Lotte van Beek	430
3	(United States) Brittany Bowe	389

=== 3000 and 5000 m ===
Rank	Name	Points
1	(Czech Republic) Martina Sáblíková	550
2	(Germany) Claudia Pechstein	416
3	(Netherlands) Yvonne Nauta	326

=== Mass start ===
Rank	Name	Points
1	(Italy) Francesca Lollobrigida	200
2	(Netherlands) Irene Schouten	190
3	(Netherlands) Janneke Ensing	155

=== Team pursuit ===
Rank	Country	Points
1	Netherlands	450
2	Poland	315
3	Japan	285

=== Grand World Cup ===
Rank	Name	Points
1	(United States) Heather Richardson	108,25
2	(Netherlands) Ireen Wüst	99
3	(United States) Brittany Bowe	82,5
