= 2013–14 ISU Speed Skating World Cup – Men's 5000 and 10000 metres =

The 5000 and 10000 meters distances for men in the 2013–14 ISU Speed Skating World Cup was contested over six races on six occasions, out of a total of six World Cup occasions for the season, with the first occasion taking place in Calgary, Alberta, Canada, on 8–10 November 2013, and the final occasion taking place in Heerenveen, Netherlands, on 14–16 March 2014. Five of the races were over 5000 metres, and one race was over 10000 metres.

Jorrit Bergsma of the Netherlands successfully defended his title from the previous season, while Patrick Beckert of Germany came second, and Sven Kramer of the Netherlands came third.

== Top three ==
| Position | Athlete | Points | Previous season |
|---|---|---|---|
| 1 | (Netherlands) Jorrit Bergsma | 500 | 1st |
| 2 | (Germany) Patrick Beckert | 311 | 11th |
| 3 | (Netherlands) Sven Kramer | 300 | 3rd |

== Race medallists ==
| Occasion # | Location | Date | Distance | Gold | Time | Silver | Time | Bronze | Time | Report |
|---|---|---|---|---|---|---|---|---|---|---|
| 1 | Calgary, Alberta, Canada | 10 November | 5000 metres | Sven Kramer; Netherlands | 6:04.46 | Jorrit Bergsma; Netherlands | 6:06.93 | Lee Seung-hoon; South Korea | 6:07.04 | |
| 2 | Salt Lake City, United States | 17 November | 5000 metres | Sven Kramer; Netherlands | 6:04.59 | Bob de Jong; Netherlands | 6:07.43 | Jorrit Bergsma; Netherlands | 6:08.13 | |
| 3 | Astana, Kazakhstan | 1 December | 10000 metres | Sven Kramer; Netherlands | 13:02.38 | Alexis Contin; France | 13:14.64 | Patrick Beckert; Germany | 13:18.73 | |
| 4 | Berlin, Germany | 8 December | 5000 metres | Jorrit Bergsma; Netherlands | 6:14.82 | Jan Blokhuijsen; Netherlands | 6:15.66 | Lee Seung-hoon; South Korea | 6:16.12 | |
| 5 | Inzell, Germany | 7 March | 5000 metres | Jorrit Bergsma; Netherlands | 6:14.08 | Sverre Lunde Pedersen; Norway | 6:19.48 | Patrick Beckert; Germany | 6:22.71 | |
| 6 | Heerenveen, Netherlands | 16 March | 5000 metres | Jorrit Bergsma; Netherlands | 6:13.80 | Jan Blokhuijsen; Netherlands | 6:19.03 | Aleksandr Rumyantsev; Russia | 6:25.06 | |

== Standings ==
Standings as of 16 March 2014 (end of the season).

| # | Name | Nat. | CAL | SLC | AST | BER | INZ | HVN | Total |
|---|---|---|---|---|---|---|---|---|---|
| 1 | Jorrit Bergsma | (Netherlands) | 80 | 70 | | 100 | 100 | 150 | 500 |
| 2 | Patrick Beckert | (Germany) | 30 | 21 | 70 | 30 | 70 | 90 | 311 |
| 3 | Sven Kramer | (Netherlands) | 100 | 100 | 100 | | | | 300 |
| 4 | Sverre Lunde Pedersen | (Norway) | 35 | 45 | 25 | 40 | 80 | 40 | 265 |
| 5 | Jan Blokhuijsen | (Netherlands) | 45 | 18 | | 80 | | 120 | 263 |
| 6 | Douwe de Vries | (Netherlands) | | 27 | 32 | 50 | 60 | 75 | 244 |
| 7 | Lee Seung-hoon | (South Korea) | 70 | 40 | 50 | 70 | | | 230 |
| 8 | Aleksandr Rumyantsev | (Russia) | 7 | 19 | 15 | 27 | 40 | 105 | 213 |
| 9 | Bob de Jong | (Netherlands) | 60 | 80 | | 21 | 45 | | 206 |
| 10 | Bart Swings | (Belgium) | 25 | 25 | 60 | 60 | | 28 | 198 |
| 11 | Alexis Contin | (France) | 27 | 30 | 80 | 25 | | | 162 |
| 12 | Jonathan Kuck | (United States) | 32 | 50 | 45 | 35 | | | 162 |
| 13 | Moritz Geisreiter | (Germany) | 40 | 16 | 35 | 18 | 14 | 21 | 144 |
| 14 | Håvard Bøkko | (Norway) | 18 | 14 | 40 | | 25 | 45 | 142 |
| 15 | Ivan Skobrev | (Russia) | 23 | 60 | | 45 | | | 128 |
| 16 | Dmitry Babenko | (Kazakhstan) | 16 | 12 | 11 | 32 | 21 | 36 | 128 |
| 17 | Denis Yuskov | (Russia) | 21 | 35 | | 16 | 50 | | 122 |
| 18 | Danil Sinitsyn | (Russia) | 5 | 32 | 30 | 12 | 16 | 24 | 119 |
| 19 | Yevgeny Seryaev | (Russia) | 9 | 7 | 9 | 15 | 35 | | 75 |
| 20 | Shane Dobbin | (New Zealand) | 15 | 23 | 21 | 14 | | | 73 |
| 21 | Frank Vreugdenhil | (Netherlands) | | | | | 32 | 32 | 64 |
| 22 | Alexej Baumgärtner | (Germany) | 12 | 11 | 19 | 10 | 12 | | 64 |
| 23 | Rob Hadders | (Netherlands) | | | | 23 | 35 | | 58 |
| 24 | Koen Verweij | (Netherlands) | 50 | | | | | | 50 |
| 25 | Jan Szymański | (Poland) | 6 | | 6 | 19 | 10 | | 41 |
| 26 | Andrea Giovannini | (Italy) | 1 | 3 | | 3 | 27 | | 34 |
| 27 | Brian Hansen | (United States) | 19 | 10 | | | | | 29 |
| 28 | Marco Weber | (Germany) | | | 18 | 11 | | | 29 |
| 29 | Emery Lehman | (United States) | 11 | 15 | 2 | | | | 28 |
| 30 | Bob de Vries | (Netherlands) | | | 27 | | | | 27 |
| 31 | Fredrik van der Horst | (Norway) | | | | 4 | 23 | | 27 |
| 32 | Patrick Meek | (United States) | 2 | | | 7 | 18 | | 27 |
| 33 | Robert Bovenhuis | (Netherlands) | | | 23 | | | | 23 |
| 34 | Robert Lehmann | (Germany) | 14 | | | 9 | | | 23 |
| 35 | Sergey Gryaztsov | (Russia) | | | | | 19 | | 19 |
| 36 | Ewen Fernandez | (France) | 4 | 9 | | 6 | | | 19 |
| 37 | Piotr Puszkarski | (Poland) | | | | | 15 | | 15 |
| 38 | Jordan Belchos | (Canada) | | 2 | 7 | 5 | | | 14 |
| 39 | Felix Rijhnen | (Germany) | | | | | 11 | | 11 |
| 40 | Lucas Makowsky | (Canada) | 10 | | | | | | 10 |
| 41 | Martin Hänggi | (Switzerland) | | | | | 9 | | 9 |
| 42 | Marco Cignini | (Italy) | | 3 | | | 5 | | 8 |
| 43 | Sebastian Druszkiewicz | (Poland) | | | | | 7 | | 7 |
| 44 | Felix Maly | (Germany) | | | | | 6 | | 6 |
| 44 | Haralds Silovs | (Latvia) | | 6 | | | | | 6 |
| 46 | Shane Williamson | (Japan) | | 4 | | 2 | | | 6 |
| 47 | Arjen van der Kieft | (Netherlands) | | | 5 | | | | 5 |
| 47 | Kim Cheol-min | (South Korea) | | 5 | | | | | 5 |
| 49 | Takuro Ogawa | (Japan) | | 4 | | | | | 4 |
| 49 | Maarten Swings | (Belgium) | | | | | 4 | | 4 |
| 51 | Robert Binna | (Austria) | | | | | 3 | | 3 |
| 51 | Simen Spieler Nilsen | (Norway) | 3 | | | | | | 3 |
| 53 | Livio Wenger | (Switzerland) | | | | | 2 | | 2 |
| 54 | Joo Hyong-jun | (South Korea) | | | | 1 | | | 1 |
| 54 | Ko Byung-wook | (South Korea) | | | 1 | | | | 1 |
| 54 | Shota Nakamura | (Japan) | | | | | 1 | | 1 |
| 54 | Konrad Niedźwiedzki | (Poland) | | 1 | | | | | 1 |
