= 2013–14 ISU Speed Skating World Cup – Men's mass start =

The men's mass start in the 2013–14 ISU Speed Skating World Cup was contested over two races on two occasions, out of a total of six World Cup occasions for the season, with the first occasion involving the event taking place in Inzell, Germany, on 7–9 March 2014, and the second occasion taking place in Heerenveen, Netherlands, on 14–16 March 2014. The races were over 20 laps.

Bob de Vries of the Netherlands won the cup, while fellow Dutchman, the defending champion Arjan Stroetinga, came second, and Bart Swings of Belgium came third.

== Top three ==
Position	Athlete	Points	Previous season
1	(Netherlands) Bob de Vries	220	—
2	(Netherlands) Arjan Stroetinga	175	1st
3	(Belgium) Bart Swings	170	2nd

== Race medallists ==
Occasion #	Location	Date	Gold	Race points	Silver	Race points	Bronze	Race points	Report
5	Inzell, Germany	8 March	Arjan Stroetinga; Netherlands	31	Bart Swings; Belgium	17	Bob de Vries; Netherlands	11	
6	Heerenveen, Netherlands	14 March	Bob de Vries; Netherlands	36	Maarten Swings; Belgium	18	Bram Smallenbroek; Austria	0	

== Standings ==
Standings as of 14 March 2014 (end of the season).

#	Name	Nat.	INZ	HVN	Total
1	Bob de Vries	(Netherlands)	70	150	220
2	Arjan Stroetinga	(Netherlands)	100	75	175
3	Bart Swings	(Belgium)	80	90	170
4	Maarten Swings	(Belgium)	28	120	148
5	Bram Smallenbroek	(Austria)	18	105	123
6	Christijn Groeneveld	(Netherlands)	60	45	105
7	Patrick Meek	(United States)	50	40	90
8	Andrea Giovannini	(Italy)	36	36	72
9	Felix Rijhnen	(Germany)	24	32	56
10	Brian Hansen	(United States)	45		45
11	Martin Hänggi	(Switzerland)	14	28	42
12	Fredrik van der Horst	(Norway)	40		40
13	Felix Maly	(Germany)	32		32
14	Sebastian Druszkiewicz	(Poland)	21		21
15	Yevgeny Seryaev	(Russia)	16		16
16	Shota Nakamura	(Japan)	12		12
17	Håvard Holmefjord Lorentzen	(Norway)	10		10
18	Robert Binna	(Austria)	8		8
19	Luca Stefani	(Italy)	6		6
20	Livio Wenger	(Switzerland)	5		5
