= 2013–14 ISU Speed Skating World Cup – World Cup 5 =

The fifth competition weekend of the 2013–14 ISU Speed Skating World Cup was held in Eisstadion Inzell in Inzell, Germany, from Friday, 7 March, until Sunday, 9 March 2014.

By winning the men's 1000 meters race, Shani Davis of the United States secured the men's 1000 metres World Cup, as he extended his lead to 210 points, with only 150 points available for the winner on the last competition weekend.

== Schedule ==
The detailed schedule of events:

Date	Session	Events	Comment
Friday, 7 March	Morning	12:00: 5000 m men 12:52: 1500 m women	Division B
Friday, 7 March	Afternoon	15:00: 500 m women (1); 15:45: 5000 m men 17:06: 1500 m women	Division A
Saturday, 8 March	Morning	10:10: 500 m men (1); 10:27: 3000 m women 11:15: 1000 m men	Division B
Saturday, 8 March	Afternoon	13:30: 500 m women (2); 13:59: 500 m men (1); 14:39: 3000 m women 15:41: 1000 m men	Division A
Saturday, 8 March	Afternoon	16:34: Mass start men	
Sunday, 9 March	Morning	10:30: 500 m men (2); 10:57: 1000 m women 11:42: 1500 m men	Division B
Sunday, 9 March	Afternoon	13:30: 500 m men (2); 13:57: 1000 m women 14:42: 1500 m men	Division A
Sunday, 9 March	Afternoon	15:36: Mass start women	

All times are CET (UTC+1).

== Medal summary ==
=== Men's events ===
Event	Race #	Gold	Time	Silver	Time	Bronze	Time	Report
500 m	1	Ronald Mulder; Netherlands	34.96	Gilmore Junio; Canada	35.02	Nico Ihle; Germany	35.10	
500 m	2	Jan Smeekens; Netherlands	34.91	Nico Ihle; Germany	34.97	Michel Mulder; Netherlands	35.00	
1000 m		Shani Davis; United States	1:08.70	Stefan Groothuis; Netherlands	1:08.80	Brian Hansen; United States	1:08.90	
1500 m		Brian Hansen; United States	1:44.58	Denny Morrison; Canada	1:45.28	Koen Verweij; Netherlands	1:45.68	
5000 m		Jorrit Bergsma; Netherlands	6:14.08	Sverre Lunde Pedersen; Norway	6:19.48	Patrick Beckert; Germany	6:22.71	
Mass start		Arjan Stroetinga; Netherlands	—	Bart Swings; Belgium	—	Bob de Vries; Netherlands	—	

=== Women's events ===
Event	Race #	Gold	Time	Silver	Time	Bronze	Time	Report
500 m	1	Heather Richardson; United States	37.85	Judith Hesse; Germany	37.86	Olga Fatkulina; Russia	37.89	
500 m	2	Heather Richardson; United States	37.70	Olga Fatkulina; Russia	37.84	Jenny Wolf; Germany	37.89	
1000 m		Heather Richardson; United States	1:14.87	Brittany Bowe; United States	1:15.26	Olga Fatkulina; Russia	1:15.34	
1500 m		Ireen Wüst; Netherlands	1:54.03	Lotte van Beek; Netherlands	1:54.70	Brittany Bowe; United States	1:55.06	
3000 m		Ireen Wüst; Netherlands	4:01.52	Martina Sáblíková; Czech Republic	4:04.00	Yvonne Nauta; Netherlands	4:04.44	
Mass start		Claudia Pechstein; Germany	—	Janneke Ensing; Netherlands	—	Irene Schouten; Netherlands	—	

== Standings ==
The top ten standings in the contested cups after the weekend.

=== Men's cups ===
500 m

#	Name	Nat.	CAL1	CAL2	SLC1	SLC2	AST1	AST2	BER1	BER2	INZ1	INZ2	Total
1	Michel Mulder	(Netherlands)	60	32	70	60	21	45	100	70	50	70	578
2	Mo Tae-bum	(South Korea)	80	80	5	70	32	80	80	100			527
3	Ronald Mulder	(Netherlands)	100	70	24	80	70	32			100	36	512
4	Artyom Kuznetsov	(Russia)	50	14	36	14	100	70	50	32	21	60	447
5	Tucker Fredricks	(United States)	25	100	50	8	45	50	36	40	36	28	418
6	Keiichiro Nagashima	(Japan)	19	4	16	100	45	100	70	60			414
7	Joji Kato	(Japan)	10	40	100	21	50	60	45	80			406
8	Jan Smeekens	(Netherlands)	40	40	45	12	60	28			60	100	385
9	Jesper Hospes	(Netherlands)	45	45	18	28	36	40	40	50	24	40	366
10	Dmitry Lobkov	(Russia)	32	18	28	10	80	36	60	36	32	32	364

1000 m

#	Name	Nat.	CAL	SLC	AST	BER	INZ	Total
1	Shani Davis	(United States)	100	100	100	70	100	470
2	Michel Mulder	(Netherlands)	32	50	70	80	28	260
3	Brian Hansen	(United States)	70	70			70	210
4	Kjeld Nuis	(Netherlands)	80	80			40	200
5	Denis Kuzin	(Kazakhstan)	60	36	45	50	6	197
6	Denny Morrison	(Canada)	24	60	60	5	45	194
7	Koen Verweij	(Netherlands)	50	32	36		60	178
8	Mo Tae-bum	(South Korea)	45		28	100		173
9	Stefan Groothuis	(Netherlands)	28		40		80	148
10	Håvard Holmefjord Lorentzen	(Netherlands)	2	19	32	60	32	145

1500 m

#	Name	Nat.	CAL	SLC	AST	BER	INZ	Total
1	Shani Davis	(United States)	80	100	50	36	60	326
2	Koen Verweij	(Netherlands)	100	70	80		70	320
3	Zbigniew Bródka	(Poland)	36	45	70	80	50	281
4	Denis Yuskov	(Russia)	14	60	100	70	36	280
5	Brian Hansen	(United States)	25	80			100	205
6	Sverre Lunde Pedersen	(Norway)	45	28	60	60		193
7	Denny Morrison	(Canada)	24	50	24		80	178
8	Rhian Ket	(Netherlands)	32	14	45	45	32	168
9	Konrad Niedźwiedzki	(Poland)	40	32	28	40	28	168
10	Kjeld Nuis	(Netherlands)	70	40			45	155

5000/10000 m

#	Name	Nat.	CAL	SLC	AST	BER	INZ	Total
1	Jorrit Bergsma	(Netherlands)	80	70		100	100	350
2	Sven Kramer	(Netherlands)	100	100	100			300
3	Lee Seung-hoon	(South Korea)	70	40	50	70		230
4	Sverre Lunde Pedersen	(Norway)	35	45	25	40	80	225
5	Patrick Beckert	(Germany)	30	21	70	30	70	221
6	Bob de Jong	(Netherlands)	60	80		21	45	206
7	Bart Swings	(Belgium)	25	25	60	60		170
8	Douwe de Vries	(Netherlands)		27	32	50	60	169
9	Alexis Contin	(France)	27	30	80	25		162
10	Jonathan Kuck	(United States)	32	50	45	35		162

Mass start

#	Name	Nat.	INZ	Total
1	Arjan Stroetinga	(Netherlands)	100	100
2	Bart Swings	(Belgium)	80	80
3	Bob de Vries	(Netherlands)	70	70
4	Christijn Groeneveld	(Netherlands)	60	60
5	Patrick Meek	(United States)	50	50
6	Brian Hansen	(United States)	45	45
7	Fredrik van der Horst	(Norway)	40	40
8	Andrea Giovannini	(Italy)	36	36
9	Felix Maly	(Germany)	32	32
10	Maarten Swings	(Belgium)	28	28

Grand World Cup

#	Name	Nat.	CAL	SLC	AST	BER	INZ	Total
1	Shani Davis	(United States)	18	20	15	7	16	76
2	Koen Verweij	(Netherlands)	20	7	8		13	48
3	Michel Mulder	(Netherlands)	6.5	8	7	16.5	6	44
4	Brian Hansen	(United States)	7	15			17	39
5	Jorrit Bergsma	(Netherlands)	8	7		10	10	35
6	Mo Tae-bum	(South Korea)	8	3.5	4	19		34.5
7	Sven Kramer	(Netherlands)	10	10	10			30
8	Denis Yuskov	(Russia)		6	10	7	5	28
9	Zbigniew Bródka	(Poland)			7	8	10	25
9	Denny Morrison	(Canada)		11	6		8	25

=== Women's cups ===
500 m

#	Name	Nat.	CAL1	CAL2	SLC1	SLC2	AST1	AST2	BER1	BER2	INZ1	INZ2	Total
1	Lee Sang-hwa	(South Korea)	100	100	100	100	100	100	100				700
2	Heather Richardson	(United States)	50	50	70	80	60	50	60	70	100	100	690
3	Olga Fatkulina	(Russia)	45	45	50	70	50	70	80	100	70	80	660
4	Jenny Wolf	(Germany)	80	80	60	28	80	80	5	60	50	70	593
5	Nao Kodaira	(Japan)	60	36	40	21	70		50	45	60	60	442
6	Wang Beixing	(China)	70	70	80	60			70	80			430
7	Margot Boer	(Netherlands)	40	60	45	45			36	36	45	36	343
8	Thijsje Oenema	(Netherlands)	10	18	14	16	45	60	45	50	32	50	340
9	Judith Hesse	(Germany)	36	32	32	40			8	32	80	40	300
10	Brittany Bowe	(United States)	32	28	36	32	28	24	40		36		256

1000 m

#	Name	Nat.	CAL	SLC	AST	BER	INZ	Total
1	Heather Richardson	(United States)	100	80	100	100	100	480
2	Brittany Bowe	(United States)	70	100	80	80	80	410
3	Olga Fatkulina	(Russia)	50	60	70	70	70	320
4	Lotte van Beek	(Netherlands)	80	32		60	36	208
5	Margot Boer	(Netherlands)	45	50		36	60	191
6	Lee Sang-hwa	(South Korea)	60		50	45		155
7	Karolína Erbanová	(Czech Republic)	16	18	40	21	50	145
8	Nao Kodaira	(Japan)	24	40	28	32	16	140
9	Yuliya Skokova	(Russia)	15	8	60		40	123
10	Ireen Wüst	(Netherlands)	40	70				110

1500 m

#	Name	Nat.	CAL	SLC	AST	BER	INZ	Total
1	Ireen Wüst	(Netherlands)	80	100		100	100	380
2	Brittany Bowe	(United States)	19	80	100	45	70	314
3	Lotte van Beek	(Netherlands)	100	60		70	80	310
4	Yuliya Skokova	(Russia)	32	50	80	16	60	238
5	Yekaterina Lobysheva	(Russia)	50	40		40	50	180
6	Katarzyna Bachleda-Curuś	(Poland)	24	45	12	80	18	179
7	Marrit Leenstra	(Netherlands)	60			60	32	152
8	Ida Njåtun	(Norway)	45	36	32	36		149
9	Monique Angermüller	(Germany)	21	32	40	18	28	139
10	Claudia Pechstein	(Germany)	36	24	45	32		137

3000/5000 m

#	Name	Nat.	CAL	SLC	AST	BER	INZ	Total
1	Martina Sáblíková	(Czech Republic)	80	100	100	100	80	460
2	Claudia Pechstein	(Germany)	100	80	80	80	40	380
3	Ireen Wüst	(Netherlands)	70			70	100	240
4	Yvonne Nauta	(Netherlands)	45	21	70		70	206
5	Katarzyna Bachleda-Curuś	(Poland)	35	40	35	60	35	205
5	Jorien Voorhuis	(Netherlands)	50	60		45	50	205
7	Ida Njåtun	(Norway)	40	45	30	40	45	200
8	Antoinette de Jong	(Netherlands)	60	70		50		180
9	Olga Graf	(Russia)	21	18	40	30	60	169
10	Shiho Ishizawa	(Japan)	27	25	60	16	30	158

Mass start

#	Name	Nat.	INZ	Total
1	Claudia Pechstein	(Germany)	100	100
2	Janneke Ensing	(Netherlands)	80	80
3	Irene Schouten	(Netherlands)	70	70
4	Mariska Huisman	(Netherlands)	60	60
5	Francesca Lollobrigida	(Italy)	50	50
6	Ivanie Blondin	(Canada)	45	45
7	Maria Lamb	(United States)	40	40
8	Masako Hozumi	(Japan)	36	36
9	Jelena Peeters	(Belgium)	32	32
10	Saskia Alusalu	(Estonia)	28	28

Grand World Cup

#	Name	Nat.	CAL	SLC	AST	BER	INZ	Total
1	Heather Richardson	(United States)	15	22.5	15.5	16.5	20	89.5
2	Ireen Wüst	(Netherlands)	15	17		17	20	69
3	Brittany Bowe	(United States)	7	18	18	8	15	66
4	Olga Fatkulina	(Russia)	5	12	13	16	14.5	60.5
5	Martina Sáblíková	(Czech Republic)	15	10	10	10	8	53
6	Lee Sang-hwa	(South Korea)	16	10	15	5		46
7	Lotte van Beek	(Netherlands)	18	6		13	8	45
8	Claudia Pechstein	(Germany)	10	8	8	8	10	44
9	Jenny Wolf	(Germany)	8	3	8	3	6	28
10	Yuliya Skokova	(Russia)		5	14		6	25
