= 2013–14 ISU Speed Skating World Cup – World Cup 4 – Men's 5000 metres =

The men's 5000 metres race of the 2013–14 ISU Speed Skating World Cup 4, arranged in Sportforum Hohenschönhausen, in Berlin, Germany, was held on 8 December 2013.

Jorrit Bergsma of the Netherlands won the race, while fellow Dutchman Jan Blokhuijsen came second, and Lee Seung-hoon of South Korea came third. Dmitry Babenko of Kazakhstan won the Division B race.

== Results ==
The race took place on Sunday, 8 December 2013, with Division B scheduled in the morning session, at 11:07, and Division A scheduled in the afternoon session, at 15:14.

=== Division A ===
Rank	Name	Nat.	Pair	Lane	Time	WC points	GWC points
1st place, gold medalist(s)	Jorrit Bergsma	(Netherlands)	8	o	6:14.82	100	10
2nd place, silver medalist(s)	Jan Blokhuijsen	(Netherlands)	3	o	6:15.66	80	8
3rd place, bronze medalist(s)	Lee Seung-hoon	(South Korea)	8	i	6:16.12	70	7
4	Bart Swings	(Belgium)	5	i	6:18.62	60	6
5	Douwe de Vries	(Netherlands)	2	i	6:18.64	50	5
6	Ivan Skobrev	(Russia)	4	o	6:18.66	45	—
7	Sverre Lunde Pedersen	(Norway)	5	o	6:19.03	40	
8	Jonathan Kuck	(United States)	6	i	6:20.24	35	
9	Patrick Beckert	(Germany)	6	o	6:20.30	30	
10	Alexis Contin	(France)	7	o	6:20.44	25	
11	Bob de Jong	(Netherlands)	7	i	6:22.14	21	
12	Moritz Geisreiter	(Germany)	4	i	6:22.52	18	
13	Denis Yuskov	(Russia)	1	i	6:23.87	16	
14	Shane Dobbin	(New Zealand)	2	o	6:26.68	14	
15	Daniil Sinitsyn	(Russia)	3	i	6:30.95	12	
16	Alexej Baumgärtner	(Germany)	1	o	6:35.33	10	

=== Division B ===
Rank	Name	Nat.	Pair	Lane	Time	WC points
1	Dmitry Babenko	(Kazakhstan)	18	o	6:21.15	32
2	Aleksandr Rumyantsev	(Russia)	18	i	6:21.75	27
3	Rob Hadders	(Netherlands)	2	i	6:23.38	23
4	Jan Szymański	(Poland)	15	i	6:26.36	19
5	Yevgeny Seryaev	(Russia)	17	i	6:26.69	15
6	Marco Weber	(Germany)	17	o	6:27.23	11
7	Robert Lehmann	(Germany)	16	i	6:29.53	9
8	Patrick Meek	(United States)	12	i	6:29.55	7
9	Ewen Fernandez	(France)	16	o	6:30.21	6
10	Jordan Belchos	(Canada)	14	i	6:30.91	5
11	Fredrik van der Horst	(Norway)	3	i	6:31.89	4
12	Andrea Giovannini	(Italy)	13	i	6:34.38	3
13	Shane Williamson	(Japan)	14	o	6:35.88	2
14	Joo Hyong-jun	(South Korea)	10	i	6:36.49	1
15	Lee Jin-yeong	(South Korea)	9	i	6:36.51	—
16	Bram Smallenbroek	(Austria)	8	i	6:37.20	
17	Sun Longjiang	(China)	10	o	6:37.30	
18	Mathieu Giroux	(Canada)	11	i	6:38.40	
19	Luca Stefani	(Italy)	3	o	6:38.78	
20	Lucas Makowsky	(Canada)	15	o	6:39.53	
21	Roland Cieslak	(Poland)	8	o	6:39.69	
22	Sebastian Druszkiewicz	(Poland)	11	o	6:40.28	
23	Vitaly Mikhailov	(Belarus)	9	o	6:41.40	
24	Ko Byung-wook	(South Korea)	12	o	6:42.92	
25	Linus Heidegger	(Austria)	7	o	6:43.14	
26	Simen Spieler Nilsen	(Norway)	13	o	6:43.30	
27	Reyon Kay	(New Zealand)	4	i	6:45.57	
28	Martin Hänggi	(Switzerland)	6	i	6:45.63	
29	Roger Schneider	(Switzerland)	7	i	6:46.33	
30	Maarten Swings	(Belgium)	5	i	6:48.48	
31	Stefan Due Schmidt	(Denmark)	1	i	6:49.70	
32	Maksim Baklashkin	(Kazakhstan)	6	o	6:49.95	
33	Zdeněk Haselberger	(Czech Republic)	4	o	6:51.37	
34	Liu Yan	(China)	5	o	6:52.98	
35	Wannes van Preat	(Belgium)	1	o	7:02.34	
36	David Andersson	(Sweden)	2	o	DQ	
