= 2012–13 ISU Speed Skating World Cup – Men's mass start =

The men's mass start in the 2012–13 ISU Speed Skating World Cup was contested over four races on four occasions, out of a total of nine World Cup occasions for the season, with the first occasion taking place in Heerenveen, Netherlands, on 16–18 November 2012, and the final occasion also taking place in Heerenveen on 8–10 March 2013.

Arjan Stroetinga of the Netherlands won the cup, while Bart Swings of Belgium came second, and Jordan Belchos of Canada came third. The defending champion, Alexis Contin of France, ended up in 9th place.

== Top three ==
Medal	Athlete	Points	Previous season
Gold	(Netherlands) Arjan Stroetinga	330	4th
Silver	(Belgium) Bart Swings	310	13th
Bronze	(Canada) Jordan Belchos	216	15th

== Race medallists ==
Occasion #	Location	Date	Gold	Time	Silver	Time	Bronze	Time	Report
1	Heerenveen, Netherlands	18 November	Christijn Groeneveld; Netherlands	10:14.55	Arjan Stroetinga; Netherlands	10:14.61	Alexis Contin; France	10:14.67	
2	Kolomna, Russia	25 November	Jorrit Bergsma; Netherlands	10:00.07	Ewen Fernandez; France	10:00.42	Alexis Contin; France	10:08.98	
7	Inzell, Germany	10 February	Arjan Stroetinga; Netherlands	9:57.56	Haralds Silovs; Latvia	9:58.93	Christijn Groeneveld; Netherlands	9:59.80	
9	Heerenveen, Netherlands	10 March	Bart Swings; Belgium	10:32.32	Joo Hyung-joon; South Korea	10:32.37	Arjan Stroetinga; Netherlands	10:32.40	

== Standings ==
Standings as of 10 March 2013 (end of the season).

#	Name	Nat.	HVN1	KOL	INZ	HVN2	Total
1	Arjan Stroetinga	(Netherlands)	80	45	100	105	330
2	Bart Swings	(Belgium)	60	40	60	150	310
3	Jordan Belchos	(Canada)	36	60	45	75	216
4	Christijn Groeneveld	(Netherlands)	100	32	70	10	212
5	Jorrit Bergsma	(Netherlands)	45	100	50	0	195
6	Lee Seung-hoon	(South Korea)	24	–	40	90	154
7	Marco Weber	(Germany)	40	50	32	32	154
8	Joo Hyung-joon	(South Korea)	25	–	–	120	145
9	Alexis Contin	(France)	70	70	–	–	140
10	Haralds Silovs	(Latvia)	14	36	80	–	130
11	Fredrik van der Horst	(Norway)	32	–	36	40	108
12	Ewen Fernandez	(France)	19	80	–	–	99
13	Roland Cieslak	(Poland)	4	15	18	45	82
14	Patrick Meek	(United States)	12	0	28	36	76
15	Dmitry Babenko	(Kazakhstan)	50	24	–	–	74
16	Bram Smallenbroek	(Austria)	0	25	12	28	65
17	Sun Longjiang	(China)	15	28	21	–	64
18	Roger Schneider	(Switzerland)	11	18	6	24	59
19	Tormod Bjørnetun Haugen	(Norway)	21	14	10	14	59
20	Dmitri Fedotov	(Russia)	10	12	16	18	56
21	Tyler Derraugh	(Canada)	28	21	–	–	49
22	Kim Cheol-min	(South Korea)	–	–	25	21	46
23	Mirko Giacomo Nenzi	(Italy)	–	19	8	16	43
24	Ko Byung-wook	(South Korea)	18	–	24	–	42
25	Ferre Spruyt	(Belgium)	6	10	14	–	30
26	Junya Miwa	(Japan)	–	–	19	–	19
27	Jan Szymański	(Poland)	–	16	–	–	16
27	Jonathan Garcia	(United States)	16	–	–	–	16
29	Robert Lehmann	(Germany)	–	11	5	–	16
30	Li Bailin	(China)	8	8	–	–	16
31	Joey Mantia	(United States)	–	–	15	–	15
32	Xu Peng	(China)	8	–	4	–	12
33	Zdeněk Haselberger	(Czech Republic)	0	0	11	–	11
34	Maarten Swings	(Belgium)	2	8	0	–	10
35	Stefan due Schmidt	(Denmark)	1	6	2	–	9
36	Jonas Pflug	(Germany)	–	–	8	–	8
37	Paul Dyrud	(United States)	–	–	6	–	6
37	Mark Jackson	(New Zealand)	6	0	–	–	6
39	Sebastian Druszkiewicz	(Poland)	5	1	–	–	6
40	Vitaly Mikhailov	(Belarus)	0	4	0	–	4
41	Sergey Gryaztsov	(Russia)	0	2	–	–	2
42	Armin Hager	(Austria)	–	–	1	–	1
