= 2013–14 ISU Speed Skating World Cup – World Cup 5 – Men's 1500 metres =

2014 speed skating race

The men's 1500 metres race of the 2013–14 ISU Speed Skating World Cup 5, arranged in Eisstadion Inzell, in Inzell, Germany, was held on 9 March 2014.

Brian Hansen of the United States won the race, while Denny Morrison of Canada came second, and Koen Verweij of the Netherlands came third. Mirko Giacomo Nenzi of Italy won the Division B race.

== Results ==
The race took place on Sunday, 9 March, with Division B scheduled in the morning session, at 11:42, and Division A scheduled in the afternoon session, at 14:42.

=== Division A ===
Rank	Name	Nat.	Pair	Lane	Time	WC points	GWC points
1st place, gold medalist(s)	Brian Hansen	(United States)	5	o	1:44.58	100	10
2nd place, silver medalist(s)	Denny Morrison	(Canada)	4	i	1:45.28	80	8
3rd place, bronze medalist(s)	Koen Verweij	(Netherlands)	9	o	1:45.68	70	7
4	Shani Davis	(United States)	9	i	1:45.72	60	6
5	Zbigniew Bródka	(Poland)	8	o	1:45.88	50	5
6	Kjeld Nuis	(Netherlands)	6	o	1:46.20	45	—
7	Mark Tuitert	(Netherlands)	4	o	1:46.54	40	
8	Denis Yuskov	(Russia)	8	i	1:46.60	36	
9	Rhian Ket	(Netherlands)	7	o	1:46.90	32	
10	Konrad Niedźwiedzki	(Poland)	7	i	1:47.15	28	
11	Stefan Groothuis	(Netherlands)	1	i	1:47.19	24	
12	Håvard Bøkko	(Norway)	5	i	1:47.23	21	
13	Jan Szymański	(Poland)	2	i	1:47.39	18	
14	Denis Kuzin	(Kazakhstan)	6	i	1:47.41	16	
15	Bart Swings	(Belgium)	3	o	1:48.19	14	
16	Håvard Holmefjord Lorentzen	(Norway)	3	i	1:48.66	12	
17	Bram Smallenbroek	(Austria)	1	o	1:48.95	10	
18	Aleksey Suvorov	(Russia)	2	o	1:49.13	8	

=== Division B ===
Rank	Name	Nat.	Pair	Lane	Time	WC points
1	Mirko Giacomo Nenzi	(Italy)	7	i	1:47.59	25
2	Konrád Nagy	(Hungary)	7	o	1:48.37	19
3	Sergey Gryaztsov	(Russia)	8	o	1:48.61	15
4	Piotr Puszkarski	(Poland)	3	o	1:48.73	11
5	Patrick Beckert	(Germany)	8	i	1:48.80	8
6	Mikhail Kozlov	(Russia)	2	o	1:49.72	6
7	Shota Nakamura	(Japan)	6	o	1:49.88	4
8	Fredrik van der Horst	(Norway)	3	i	1:50.13	2
9	Hubert Hirschbichler	(Germany)	4	i	1:50.26	1
10	Makoto Owada	(Japan)	4	o	1:50.43	—
11	Aleksandr Zhigin	(Kazakhstan)	6	i	1:50.77	
12	Luca Stefani	(Italy)	5	o	1:51.01	
13	Patrick Meek	(United States)	2	i	1:52.07	
14	Joel Vähä-Salo	(Finland)	5	i	1:52.80	
15	Andrea Stefani	(Italy)	1	i	1:53.75	
16	Livio Wenger	(Switzerland)	1	o	1:56.69	
