= 2013–14 ISU Speed Skating World Cup – World Cup 5 – Men's mass start =

The men's mass start race of the 2013–14 ISU Speed Skating World Cup 5, arranged in Eisstadion Inzell, in Inzell, Germany, was held on 8 March 2014.

The champion from the previous season, Arjan Stroetinga of the Netherlands, won the race, while Bart Swings of Belgium came second, and Bob de Vries of the Netherlands came third.

== Results ==
The race took place on Saturday, 8 March, scheduled in the afternoon session, at 16:34.

				Race points							
Rank	Name	Nat.	Laps	Split 1	Split 2	Split 3	Finish	Total	Time	WC points	GWC points
1st place, gold medalist(s)	Arjan Stroetinga	(Netherlands)	20				31	31		100	10
2nd place, silver medalist(s)	Bart Swings	(Belgium)	20	1	1		15	17		80	8
3rd place, bronze medalist(s)	Bob de Vries	(Netherlands)	20	2	3	5	1	11		70	7
4	Christijn Groeneveld	(Netherlands)	20				10	10		60	6
5	Patrick Meek	(United States)	20				5	5	10:11.74	50	5
6	Brian Hansen	(United States)	20	5				5	10:18.49	45	—
7	Fredrik van der Horst	(Norway)	20		5			5	10:18.56	40	
8	Andrea Giovannini	(Italy)	20	3		1		4		36	
9	Felix Maly	(Germany)	20				3	3	10:13.49	32	
10	Maarten Swings	(Belgium)	20			3		3	10:13.79	28	
11	Felix Rijhnen	(Germany)	20			2		2	10:13.94	24	
12	Sebastian Druszkiewicz	(Poland)	20		2			2	10:18.18	21	
13	Bram Smallenbroek	(Austria)	20					0	10:13.80	18	
14	Yevgeny Seryaev	(Russia)	20					0	10:14.77	16	
15	Martin Hänggi	(Switzerland)	20					0	10:15.22	14	
16	Shota Nakamura	(Japan)	20					0	10:15.38	12	
17	Håvard Holmefjord Lorentzen	(Norway)	20					0	10:15.46	10	
18	Robert Binna	(Austria)	20					0	10:17.47	8	
19	Luca Stefani	(Italy)	18					0	9:18.08	6	
20	Livio Wenger	(Switzerland)	12					0	6:14.47	5	
