= 2013–14 ISU Speed Skating World Cup – World Cup 1 – Men's 5000 metres =

The men's 5000 metres race of the 2013–14 ISU Speed Skating World Cup 1, arranged in the Olympic Oval, in Calgary, Alberta, Canada, was held on 10 November 2013.

Sven Kramer of the Netherlands won, followed by fellow Dutchman Jorrit Bergsma in second place, and Lee Seung-hoon of South Korea in third place. Jonathan Kuck of the United States won Division B.

== Results ==
The race took place on Sunday, 10 November, with Division A scheduled in the morning session, at 12:20, and Division B scheduled in the afternoon session, at 17:25.

=== Division A ===
Rank	Name	Nat.	Pair	Lane	Time	WC points	GWC points
1st place, gold medalist(s)	Sven Kramer	(Netherlands)	8	i	6:04.46	100	10
2nd place, silver medalist(s)	Jorrit Bergsma	(Netherlands)	7	o	6:06.93	80	8
3rd place, bronze medalist(s)	Lee Seung-hoon	(South Korea)	7	i	6:07.04	70	7
4	Bob de Jong	(Netherlands)	8	o	6.08:80	60	6
5	Koen Verweij	(Netherlands)	5	o	6:09.51	50	5
6	Jan Blokhuijsen	(Netherlands)	5	i	6:11.91	45	—
7	Moritz Geisreiter	(Germany)	4	i	6:13.03	40	
8	Sverre Lunde Pedersen	(Norway)	6	i	6:13.32	35	
9	Patrick Beckert	(Germany)	4	o	6:14.21	30	
10	Bart Swings	(Belgium)	3	i	6:14.65	25	
11	Denis Yuskov	(Russia)	1	i	6:15.26	21	
12	Håvard Bøkko	(Norway)	6	o	6:20.07	18	
13	Dmitry Babenko	(Kazakhstan)	2	i	6:25.27	16	
14	Robert Lehmann	(Germany)	1	o	6:25.76	14	
15	Alexej Baumgärtner	(Germany)	3	o	6:28.04	12	
16	Lucas Makowsky	(Canada)	2	o	6:34.72	10	

=== Division B ===
Rank	Name	Nat.	Pair	Lane	Time	WC points
1	Jonathan Kuck	(United States)	20	i	6:11.66	32
2	Alexis Contin	(France)	20	o	6:11.95	27
3	Ivan Skobrev	(Russia)	19	o	6:13.30	23
4	Brian Hansen	(United States)	13	i	6:17.84	19
5	Shane Dobbin	(New Zealand)	19	i	6:20.22	15
6	Emery Lehman	(United States)	18	i	6:20.57	11
7	Yevgeny Seryaev	(Russia)	11	i	6:20.75	9
8	Aleksandr Rumyantsev	(Russia)	15	i	6:21.11	7
9	Jan Szymański	(Poland)	18	o	6:21.55	6
10	Daniil Sinitsyn	(Russia)	17	o	6:24.34	5
11	Ewen Fernandez	(France)	16	i	6:25.39	4
12	Simen Spieler Nilsen	(Norway)	7	o	6:27.40	3
13	Patrick Meek	(United States)	8	o	6:27.84	2
14	Andrea Giovannini	(Italy)	14	i	6:27.86	1
15	Ko Byung-wook	(South Korea)	13	o	6:28.50	—
16	Jordan Belchos	(Canada)	15	o	6:29.48	
17	Sebastian Druszkiewicz	(Poland)	11	o	6:30.25	
18	Marco Cignini	(Italy)	12	o	6:30.69	
19	Shane Williamson	(Japan)	10	i	6:31.04	
20	Nils van der Poel	(Sweden)	10	o	6:31.81	
21	Joo Hyong-jun	(South Korea)	4	i	6:31.85	
22	Mathieu Giroux	(Canada)	6	i	6:32.07	
23	Vitaly Mikhailov	(Belarus)	4	o	6:32.56	
24	Kim Cheol-min	(South Korea)	17	i	6:32.92	
25	Lee Jin-yeong	(South Korea)	14	o	6:33.27	
26	Bram Smallenbroek	(Austria)	2	i	6:33.74	
27	Viktor Hald Thorup	(Denmark)	3	i	6:34.99	
28	Roland Cieslak	(Poland)	3	o	6:35.50	
29	Sun Longjiang	(China)	2	o	6:37.14	
30	Ferre Spruyt	(Belgium)	8	i	6:37.81	
31	Linus Heidegger	(Austria)	5	o	6:38.04	
32	Martin Hänggi	(Switzerland)	16	o	6:38.39	
33	Roger Schneider	(Switzerland)	12	i	6:38.97	
34	Artur Sergiyenko	(Kazakhstan)	5	i	6:42.24	
35	Liu Yan	(China)	9	i	6:43.83	
36	Maarten Swings	(Belgium)	6	o	6:45.62	
37	Reyon Kay	(New Zealand)	7	i	6:48.24	
38	Zdeněk Haselberger	(Czech Republic)	9	o	7:02.84	
DQ	Robert Brandt	(Finland)	1	i	DQ	
