= 2013–14 ISU Speed Skating World Cup – World Cup 2 – Men's 5000 metres =

The men's 5000 metres race of the 2013–14 ISU Speed Skating World Cup 2, arranged in the Utah Olympic Oval, in Salt Lake City, United States, was held on November 17, 2013.

All podium places were taken by Dutch skaters; Sven Kramer won the gold medal, while Bob de Jong and Jorrit Bergsma took the silver and bronze medals, respectively. Daniil Sinitsyn of Russia won the Division B race.

== Results ==
The race took place on Sunday, November 17, with Division B scheduled in the morning session, at 08:40, and Division A scheduled in the afternoon session, at 14:54.

=== Division A ===
Rank	Name	Nat.	Pair	Lane	Time	WC points	GWC points
1st place, gold medalist(s)	Sven Kramer	(Netherlands)	8	i	6:04.59	100	10
2nd place, silver medalist(s)	Bob de Jong	(Netherlands)	7	o	6:07.43	80	8
3rd place, bronze medalist(s)	Jorrit Bergsma	(Netherlands)	8	o	6:08.13	70	7
4	Ivan Skobrev	(Russia)	3	o	6:08.77	60	6
5	Jonathan Kuck	(United States)	5	o	6:09.73	50	5
6	Sverre Lunde Pedersen	(Norway)	5	i	6:10.47	45	—
7	Lee Seung-hoon	(South Korea)	7	i	6:10.82	40	
8	Denis Yuskov	(Russia)	2	i	6:11.79	35	
9	Alexis Contin	(France)	4	o	6:12.30	30	
10	Bart Swings	(Belgium)	3	i	6:13.37	25	
11	Patrick Beckert	(Germany)	4	i	6:14.05	21	
12	Jan Blokhuijsen	(Netherlands)	6	i	6:15.51	18	
13	Moritz Geisreiter	(Germany)	6	o	6:17.91	16	
14	Håvard Bøkko	(Norway)	1	i	6:21.76	14	
15	Dmitry Babenko	(Kazakhstan)	1	o	6:24.53	12	
16	Brian Hansen	(United States)	2	o	6:24.75	10	

=== Division B ===
Rank	Name	Nat.	Pair	Lane	Time	WC points
1	Daniil Sinitsyn	(Russia)	17	o	6:14.01	32
2	Douwe de Vries	(Netherlands)	3	o	6:14.53	27
3	Shane Dobbin	(New Zealand)	20	i	6:15.97	23
4	Aleksandr Rumyantsev	(Russia)	17	i	6:17.99	19
5	Emery Lehman	(United States)	19	o	6:19.86	15
6	Alexej Baumgärtner	(Germany)	19	i	6:20.90	11
7	Ewen Fernandez	(France)	16	i	6:21.43	9
8	Yevgeny Seryaev	(Russia)	18	o	6:21.60	7
9	Haralds Silovs	(Latvia)	2	i	6:23.35	6
10	Kim Cheol-min	(South Korea)	10	o	6:24.39	5
11	Shane Williamson	(Japan)	12	i	6:24.81	4
12	Andrea Giovannini	(Italy)	15	o	6:25.24	3
13	Jordan Belchos	(Canada)	14	o	6:25.28	2
14	Konrad Niedźwiedzki	(Poland)	2	o	6:25.62	1
15	Simen Spieler Nilsen	(Norway)	16	o	6:26.26	—
16	Ko Byung-wook	(South Korea)	14	i	6:26.46	
17	Mathieu Giroux	(Canada)	11	o	6:26.69	
18	Sebastian Druszkiewicz	(Poland)	13	i	6:27.73	
19	Patrick Meek	(United States)	15	i	6:27.92	
20	Joo Hyong-jun	(South Korea)	11	i	6:28.41	
21	Sun Longjiang	(China)	7	i	6:28.46	
22	Jonas Pflug	(Germany)	1	i	6:29.28	
23	Lucas Makowsky	(Canada)	18	i	6:29.711	
24	Nils van der Poel	(Sweden)	12	o	6:29.713	
25	Lee Jin-yeong	(South Korea)	9	i	6:29.75	
26	Marco Cignini	(Italy)	13	o	6:29.79	
27	Ferre Spruyt	(Belgium)	7	o	6:33.43	
28	Vitaly Mikhailov	(Belarus)	10	i	6:34.70	
29	Roger Schneider	(Switzerland)	6	o	6:36.12	
30	Viktor Hald Thorup	(Denmark)	8	i	6:36.17	
31	Bram Smallenbroek	(Austria)	9	o	6:36.76	
32	Roland Cieslak	(Poland)	8	o	6:38.29	
33	Maksim Baklashkin	(Kazakhstan)	1	o	6:38.64	
34	Martin Hänggi	(Switzerland)	6	i	6:39.01	
35	Maarten Swings	(Belgium)	5	o	6:41.91	
36	Robert Lehmann	(Germany)	20	o	6:42.92	
37	Liu Yan	(China)	5	i	6:44.10	
38	Reyon Kay	(New Zealand)	4	i	6:54.92	
39	Zdeněk Haselberger	(Czech Republic)	4	o	7:04.42	
40	Robert Brandt	(Finland)	3	i	DNS	
