= 2013–14 ISU Speed Skating World Cup – World Cup 5 – Men's 5000 metres =

The men's 5000 metres race of the 2013–14 ISU Speed Skating World Cup 5, arranged in Eisstadion Inzell, in Inzell, Germany, was held on 7 March 2014.

Jorrit Bergsma of the Netherlands won the race, while Sverre Lunde Pedersen of Norway came second, and Patrick Beckert of Germany came third. Frank Vreugdenhil of the Netherlands won the Division B race.

== Results ==
The race took place on Friday, 7 March, with Division B scheduled in the morning session, at 12:00, and Division A scheduled in the afternoon session, at 15:45.

=== Division A ===
Rank	Name	Nat.	Pair	Lane	Time	WC points	GWC points
1st place, gold medalist(s)	Jorrit Bergsma	(Netherlands)	8	i	6:14.08	100	10
2nd place, silver medalist(s)	Sverre Lunde Pedersen	(Norway)	7	o	6:19.48	80	8
3rd place, bronze medalist(s)	Patrick Beckert	(Germany)	7	i	6:22.71	70	7
4	Douwe de Vries	(Netherlands)	6	i	6:22.88	60	6
5	Denis Yuskov	(Russia)	4	i	6:23.69	50	5
6	Bob de Jong	(Netherlands)	8	o	6:23.84	45	—
7	Aleksandr Rumyantsev	(Russia)	3	i	6:24.68	40	
8	Rob Hadders	(Netherlands)	1	i	6:28.141	35	
8	Yevgeny Seryaev	(Russia)	2	i	6:28.141	35	
10	Håvard Bøkko	(Norway)	5	o	6:29.38	25	
11	Dmitry Babenko	(Kazakhstan)	4	o	6:29.57	21	
12	Patrick Meek	(United States)	1	o	6:32.08	18	
13	Danil Sinitsyn	(Russia)	5	i	6:32.59	16	
14	Moritz Geisreiter	(Germany)	6	o	6:34.70	14	
15	Alexej Baumgärtner	(Germany)	3	o	6:36.17	12	
16	Jan Szymański	(Poland)	2	o	6:36.81	10	

=== Division B ===
Rank	Name	Nat.	Pair	Lane	Time	WC points
1	Frank Vreugdenhil	(Netherlands)	5	o	6:24.90	32
2	Andrea Giovannini	(Italy)	8	i	6:30.01	27
3	Fredrik van der Horst	(Norway)	8	o	6:30.34	23
4	Sergey Gryaztsov	(Russia)	4	i	6:31.51	19
5	Piotr Puszkarski	(Poland)	2	i	6:34.26	15
6	Felix Rijhnen	(Germany)	4	o	6:34.53	11
7	Martin Hänggi	(Switzerland)	6	i	6:39.43	9
8	Sebastian Druszkiewicz	(Poland)	7	o	6:40.02	7
9	Felix Maly	(Germany)	3	o	6:40.83	6
10	Marco Cignini	(Italy)	7	i	6:44.14	5
11	Maarten Swings	(Belgium)	6	o	6:45.25	4
12	Robert Binna	(Austria)	1	i	6:51.27	3
13	Livio Wenger	(Switzerland)	2	o	6:56.30	2
14	Shota Nakamura	(Japan)	3	i	6:57.58	1
15	Zdeněk Haselberger	(Czech Republic)	5	i	7:02.10	—
