= 2013–14 ISU Speed Skating World Cup – World Cup 6 =

The sixth competition weekend of the 2013–14 ISU Speed Skating World Cup was held in the Thialf arena in Heerenveen, Netherlands, from Friday, 14 March, until Sunday, 16 March 2014.

== Schedule of events ==
As this was the final competition weekend for the season, only Division A races were held. The detailed schedule of events:

Date	Events	Comment
Friday, 14 March	16:16: 1500 m women 17:12: 1000 m men	Division A
Friday, 14 March	18:05: Mass start women 18:20: Mass start men	
Saturday, 15 March	14:15: 3000 m women 15:22: 1500 m men 16:18: 500 m women (1); 16:41: 500 m men (1)	Division A
Saturday, 15 March	17:29: Team pursuit men	
Sunday, 16 March	13:30: 500 m women (2); 14:13: 5000 m men 16:00: 1000 m women 16:49: 500 m men (2)	Division A
Sunday, 16 March	17:32: Team pursuit women	

All times are CET (UTC+1).

== Medal summary ==
=== Men's events ===
Event	Race #	Gold	Time	Silver	Time	Bronze	Time	Report
500 m	1	Ronald Mulder; Netherlands	34.81	Jan Smeekens; Netherlands	34.97	Gilmore Junio; Canada	35.00	
500 m	2	Jan Smeekens; Netherlands	34.78	Ronald Mulder; Netherlands	34.89	Michel Mulder; Netherlands	34.94	
1000 m		Denny Morrison; Canada	1:08.91	Shani Davis; United States	1:09.13	Kjeld Nuis; Netherlands	1:09.25	
1500 m		Denis Yuskov; Russia	1:45.55	Koen Verweij; Netherlands	1:45.60	Zbigniew Bródka; Poland	1:45.81	
5000 m		Jorrit Bergsma; Netherlands	6:13.80	Jan Blokhuijsen; Netherlands	6:19.03	Aleksandr Rumyantsev; Russia	6:25.06	
Mass start		Bob de Vries; Netherlands	10:51.34	Maarten Swings; Belgium	10:52.65	Bram Smallenbroek; Austria	10:23.30	
Team pursuit		Netherlands; Jan Blokhuijsen; Christijn Groeneveld; Douwe de Vries	3:45.00	Poland; Zbigniew Bródka; Konrad Niedźwiedzki; Artur Waś	3:45.73	Norway; Håvard Bøkko; Håvard Holmefjord Lorentzen; Sverre Lunde Pedersen	3:50.08	

=== Women's events ===
Event	Race #	Gold	Time	Silver	Time	Bronze	Time	Report
500 m	1	Olga Fatkulina; Russia	37.67	Heather Richardson; United States	37.79	Nao Kodaira; Japan	37.95	
500 m	2	Olga Fatkulina; Russia	37.86	Jenny Wolf; Germany	38.00	Heather Richardson; United States	38.04	
1000 m		Ireen Wüst; Netherlands	1:14.63	Margot Boer; Netherlands	1:14.92	Lotte van Beek; Netherlands	1:15.09	
1500 m		Ireen Wüst; Netherlands	1:53.68	Lotte van Beek; Netherlands	1:54.47	Yuliya Skokova; Russia	1:56.14	
3000 m		Annouk van der Weijden; Netherlands	4:02.22	Yvonne Nauta; Netherlands	4:03.65	Olga Graf; Russia	4:03.79	
Mass start		Francesca Lollobrigida; Italy	8:36.52	Irene Schouten; Netherlands	8:36.80	Ivanie Blondin; Canada	8:37.45	
Team pursuit		Netherlands; Lotte van Beek; Marrit Leenstra; Linda de Vries	2:58.19	Poland; Katarzyna Bachleda-Curuś; Natalia Czerwonka; Luiza Złotkowska	3:01.18	Japan; Ayaka Kikuchi; Maki Tabata; Nana Takagi	3:02.04	
