= 2013–14 ISU Speed Skating World Cup – World Cup 6 – Men's mass start =

The men's mass start race of the 2013–14 ISU Speed Skating World Cup 6, arranged in the Thialf arena, in Heerenveen, Netherlands, was held on 14 March 2014.

Bob de Vries of the Netherlands won the race, while Maarten Swings of Belgium came second, and Bram Smallenbroek of Austria came third.

== Results ==
The race took place on Friday, 14 March, scheduled at 18:20.

				Race points							
Rank	Name	Nat.	Laps	Split 1	Split 2	Split 3	Finish	Total	Time	WC points	GWC points
1st place, gold medalist(s)	Bob de Vries	(Netherlands)	20			5	31	36		150	15
2nd place, silver medalist(s)	Maarten Swings	(Belgium)	20			3	15	18		120	12
3rd place, bronze medalist(s)	Bram Smallenbroek	(Austria)	18					0	10:23.30	105	10.5
4	Bart Swings	(Belgium)	18	2	3	2		0	10:24.88	90	9
5	Arjan Stroetinga	(Netherlands)	18		1			0	10:24.95	75	7.5
6	Christijn Groeneveld	(Netherlands)	18	5				0	10:25.01	45	—
7	Patrick Meek	(United States)	18	3				0	10:25.20	40	
8	Andrea Giovannini	(Italy)	18	1	2			0	10:25.29	36	
9	Felix Rijhnen	(Germany)	18		5			0	10:25.42	32	
10	Martin Hänggi	(Switzerland)	18			2		0	10:25.80	28	
