= 2013–14 ISU Speed Skating World Cup – World Cup 6 – Men's team pursuit =

The men's team pursuit race of the 2013–14 ISU Speed Skating World Cup 6, arranged in the Thialf arena, in Heerenveen, Netherlands, was held on 15 March 2014.

The Dutch team took their fourth consecutive victory for the season, while the Polish team came second, and the Norwegian team came third.

== Results ==
The race took place on Saturday, 15 March, in the afternoon session, scheduled at 17:29.

Rank	Country	Skaters	Pair	Lane	Time	WC points
1st place, gold medalist(s)	Netherlands	Jan Blokhuijsen; Christijn Groeneveld; Douwe de Vries	2	i	3:41.46	150
2nd place, silver medalist(s)	Poland	Zbigniew Bródka; Konrad Niedźwiedzki; Artur Waś	1	o	3:43.81	120
3rd place, bronze medalist(s)	Norway	Håvard Bøkko; Håvard Holmefjord Lorentzen; Sverre Lunde Pedersen	1	i	3:44.94	105
4	United States	Brian Hansen; Patrick Meek; Mitchell Whitmore	2	o	3:47.67	90
