= 2013–14 ISU Speed Skating World Cup – World Cup 2 =

The second competition weekend of the 2013–14 ISU Speed Skating World Cup was held in the Utah Olympic Oval in Salt Lake City, United States, from Friday, November 15, until Sunday, November 17, 2013.

World records were broken four times during the weekend. On Friday, Lee Sang-hwa of South Korea broke the women's 500 metres record she set the previous weekend with a time of 36.57 seconds. In the second 500 metres race on the next day, she broke it again, this time with a time of 36.36 seconds. Also on Saturday, the Dutch men's team improved the team pursuit world record, which had also been set the previous weekend, with a time of 3:35.60. Finally, on Sunday, Brittany Bowe of the United States broke the women's 1000 metres record with a time of 1:12.58.

Two world records for juniors were also broken. On Friday, Antoinette de Jong of the Netherlands broke the girls' world record on 3000 metres with a time of 3:59.49, becoming the first junior to achieve a time under four minutes for the distance, a result that was good enough for a bronze medal. On Sunday, Kim Hyun-yung of South Korea broke the girls' world record on 1000 metres with a time of 1:14.95.

== Schedule ==
The detailed schedule of events:

Date	Session	Events	Comment
Friday, November 15	Morning	08:45: 3000 m women 10:10: 1500 m men 11:32: 500 m women (1); 12:24: 500 m men (1)	Division B
Friday, November 15	Afternoon	14:02: 500 m women (1); 14:29: 500 m men (1); 15:16: 3000 m women 16:20: 1500 m men	Division A
Saturday, November 16	Morning	09:30: 500 m women (2); 10:18: 1500 m women 11:25: 1000 m men	Division B
Saturday, November 16	Afternoon	13:32: 500 m women (2); 14:01: 1000 m men 14:51: 1500 m women	Division A
Saturday, November 16	Afternoon	15:46: Team pursuit men	
Sunday, November 17	Morning	08:40: 5000 m men 11:27: 1000 m women 11:47: 500 m men (2)	Division B
Sunday, November 17	Afternoon	13:32: 500 m men (2); 14:04: 1000 m women 14:54: 5000 m men	Division A
Sunday, November 17	Afternoon	16:23: Team pursuit women	

All times are MST (UTC−7).

== Medal summary ==
=== Men's events ===
Event	Race #	Gold	Time	Silver	Time	Bronze	Time	Report
500 m	1	Gilmore Junio; Canada; Joji Kato; Japan	34.258			Michel Mulder; Netherlands	34.26	
500 m	2	Keiichiro Nagashima; Japan	34.24	Ronald Mulder; Netherlands	34.25	Mo Tae-bum; South Korea	34.28	
1000 m		Shani Davis; United States	1:06.88	Kjeld Nuis; Netherlands	1:07.02	Brian Hansen; United States	1:07.03	
1500 m		Shani Davis; United States	1:41.98	Brian Hansen; United States	1:42.16	Koen Verweij; Netherlands	1:42.28	
5000 m		Sven Kramer; Netherlands	6:04.59	Bob de Jong; Netherlands	6:07.43	Jorrit Bergsma; Netherlands	6:08.13	
Team pursuit		Netherlands; Jan Blokhuijsen; Koen Verweij; Sven Kramer	3:35.60; WR	United States; Brian Hansen; Jonathan Kuck; Shani Davis	3:37.22	South Korea; Lee Seung-hoon; Kim Cheol-min; Joo Hyong-jun	3:37.51	

=== Women's events ===
Event	Race #	Gold	Time	Silver	Time	Bronze	Time	Report
500 m	1	Lee Sang-hwa; South Korea	36.57; WR	Wang Beixing; China	36.85	Heather Richardson; United States	36.97	
500 m	2	Lee Sang-hwa; South Korea	36.36; WR	Heather Richardson; United States	36.90	Olga Fatkulina; Russia	37.13	
1000 m		Brittany Bowe; United States	1:12.58; WR	Heather Richardson; United States	1:12.61	Ireen Wüst; Netherlands	1:13.33	
1500 m		Ireen Wüst; Netherlands	1:52.08	Brittany Bowe; United States	1:52.45	Heather Richardson; United States	1:52.55	
3000 m		Martina Sáblíková; Czech Republic	3:57.79	Claudia Pechstein; Germany	3:57.80	Antoinette de Jong; Netherlands	3:59.49; WRJ	
Team pursuit		Netherlands; Ireen Wüst; Antoinette de Jong; Linda de Vries	2:56.02	Canada; Christine Nesbitt; Brittany Schussler; Kali Christ	2:56.90	United States; Heather Richardson; Brittany Bowe; Jilleanne Rookard	2:57.09	

== Standings ==
The top ten standings in the contested cups after the weekend. The top five nations in the team pursuit cups.

=== Men's cups ===
500 m

#	Name	Nat.	CAL1	CAL2	SLC1	SLC2	Total
1	Ronald Mulder	(Netherlands)	100	70	24	80	274
2	Mo Tae-bum	(South Korea)	80	80	5	70	235
3	Jamie Gregg	(Canada)	70	70	40	50	230
4	Michel Mulder	(Netherlands)	60	32	70	60	222
5	Mitchell Whitmore	(United States)	36	50	60	40	186
6	Tucker Fredricks	(United States)	25	100	50	8	183
7	Joji Kato	(Japan)	10	40	100	21	171
8	Gilmore Junio	(Canada)	15	19	100	18	152
9	Keiichiro Nagashima	(Japan)	19	4	16	100	139
10	Jan Smeekens	(Netherlands)	40	40	45	12	137

1000 m

#	Name	Nat.	CAL	SLC	Total
1	Shani Davis	(United States)	100	100	200
2	Kjeld Nuis	(Netherlands)	80	80	160
3	Brian Hansen	(United States)	70	70	140
4	Denis Kuzin	(Kazakhstan)	60	36	96
5	Denny Morrison	(Canada)	24	60	84
6	Michel Mulder	(Netherlands)	32	50	82
7	Koen Verweij	(Netherlands)	50	32	82
8	Jamie Gregg	(Canada)	40	40	80
9	Mitchell Whitmore	(United States)	15	45	60
10	Mo Tae-bum	(South Korea)	45		45

1500 m

#	Name	Nat.	CAL	SLC	Total
1	Shani Davis	(United States)	80	100	180
2	Koen Verweij	(Netherlands)	100	70	170
3	Kjeld Nuis	(Netherlands)	70	40	110
4	Brian Hansen	(Netherlands)	25	80	105
5	Zbigniew Bródka	(Poland)	36	45	81
6	Denis Yuskov	(Russia)	14	60	74
7	Denny Morrison	(Canada)	24	50	74
8	Sverre Lunde Pedersen	(Norway)	45	28	73
9	Konrad Niedźwiedzki	(Poland)	40	32	72
10	Ivan Skobrev	(Russia)	60	8	68

5000/10000 m

#	Name	Nat.	CAL	SLC	Total
1	Sven Kramer	(Netherlands)	100	100	200
2	Jorrit Bergsma	(Netherlands)	80	70	150
3	Bob de Jong	(Netherlands)	60	80	140
4	Lee Seung-hoon	(South Korea)	70	40	110
5	Ivan Skobrev	(Russia)	23	60	83
6	Jonathan Kuck	(United States)	32	50	82
7	Sverre Lunde Pedersen	(Norway)	35	45	80
8	Jan Blokhuijsen	(Netherlands)	45	18	63
9	Alexis Contin	(France)	27	30	57
10	Moritz Geisreiter	(Germany)	40	16	56

Team pursuit

#	Name	CAL	SLC	Total
1	Netherlands	100	100	200
2	United States	80	80	160
3	South Korea	70	70	140
4	Norway	45	60	105
5	Canada	60	40	100

Grand World Cup

#	Name	Nat.	CAL	SLC	Total
1	Shani Davis	(United States)	18	20	38
2	Koen Verweij	(Netherlands)	20	7	27
3	Kjeld Nuis	(Netherlands)	15	8	23
4	Brian Hansen	(United States)	7	15	22
5	Sven Kramer	(Netherlands)	10	10	20
6	Jorrit Bergsma	(Netherlands)	8	7	15
7	Michel Mulder	(Netherlands)	6.5	8	14.5
8	Bob de Jong	(Netherlands)	6	8	14
9	Ronald Mulder	(Netherlands)	8.5	4	12.5
10	Ivan Skobrev	(Russia)	6	6	12

=== Women's cups ===
500 m

#	Name	Nat.	CAL1	CAL2	SLC1	SLC2	Total
1	Lee Sang-hwa	(South Korea)	100	100	100	100	400
2	Wang Beixing	(China)	70	70	80	60	280
3	Heather Richardson	(United States)	50	50	70	80	250
4	Jenny Wolf	(Germany)	80	80	60	28	248
5	Olga Fatkulina	(Russia)	45	45	50	70	210
6	Margot Boer	(Netherlands)	40	60	45	45	190
7	Nao Kodaira	(Japan)	60	36	40	21	157
8	Yu Jing	(China)	24	40	28	50	142
9	Judith Hesse	(Germany)	36	32	32	40	140
10	Brittany Bowe	(United States)	32	28	36	32	128

1000 m

#	Name	Nat.	CAL	SLC	Total
1	Heather Richardson	(United States)	100	80	180
2	Brittany Bowe	(United States)	70	100	170
3	Lotte van Beek	(Netherlands)	80	32	112
4	Ireen Wüst	(Netherlands)	40	70	110
5	Olga Fatkulina	(Russia)	50	60	110
6	Margot Boer	(Netherlands)	45	50	95
7	Wang Beixing	(China)	36	36	72
8	Nao Kodaira	(Japan)	24	40	64
9	Lee Sang-hwa	(South Korea)	60		60
10	Christine Nesbitt	(Canada)	28	21	49

1500 m

#	Name	Nat.	CAL	SLC	Total
1	Ireen Wüst	(Netherlands)	80	100	180
2	Lotte van Beek	(Netherlands)	100	60	160
3	Brittany Bowe	(United States)	19	80	99
4	Heather Richardson	(United States)	25	70	95
5	Yekaterina Lobysheva	(Russia)	50	40	90
6	Yuliya Skokova	(Russia)	32	50	82
7	Ida Njåtun	(Norway)	45	36	81
8	Martina Sáblíková	(Czech Republic)	70	5	75
9	Katarzyna Bachleda-Curuś	(Poland)	24	45	69
10	Marrit Leenstra	(Netherlands)	60		60

3000/5000 m

#	Name	Nat.	CAL	SLC	Total
1	Martina Sáblíková	(Czech Republic)	80	100	180
2	Claudia Pechstein	(Germany)	100	80	180
3	Antoinette de Jong	(Netherlands)	60	70	130
4	Jorien Voorhuis	(Netherlands)	50	60	110
5	Ida Njåtun	(Norway)	40	45	85
6	Linda de Vries	(Netherlands)	30	50	80
7	Katarzyna Bachleda-Curuś	(Poland)	35	40	75
8	Ireen Wüst	(Netherlands)	70		70
9	Yvonne Nauta	(Netherlands)	45	21	66
10	Luiza Złotkowska	(Poland)	32	30	62

Team pursuit

#	Name	CAL	SLC	Total
1	Netherlands	100	100	200
2	Canada	60	80	140
3	Japan	80	60	140
4	Poland	70	45	115
5	United States	35	70	105

Grand World Cup

#	Name	Nat.	CAL	SLC	Total
1	Heather Richardson	(United States)	15	22.5	37.5
2	Ireen Wüst	(Netherlands)	15	17	32
3	Lee Sang-hwa	(South Korea)	16	10	26
4	Brittany Bowe	(United States)	7	18	25
4	Martina Sáblíková	(Czech Republic)	15	10	25
6	Lotte van Beek	(Netherlands)	18	6	24
7	Claudia Pechstein	(Germany)	10	8	18
8	Olga Fatkulina	(Russia)	5	12	17
9	Wang Beixing	(China)	7	7	14
10	Antoinette de Jong	(Netherlands)	6	7	13
