= 2013–14 ISU Speed Skating World Cup – World Cup 6 – Women's 3000 metres =

The women's 3000 metres races of the 2013–14 ISU Speed Skating World Cup 6, arranged in the Thialf arena, in Heerenveen, Netherlands, was held on 15 March 2014.

Annouk van der Weijden of the Netherlands won the race, while Yvonne Nauta of the Netherlands came second, and Olga Graf of Russia came third.

== Result ==
The race took place on Sunday, 15 March, scheduled at 14:15.

=== Division A ===
Rank	Name	Nat.	Pair	Lane	Time	WC points	GWC points
1st place, gold medalist(s)	Annouk van der Weijden	(Netherlands)	1	o	4:02.22	150	15
2nd place, silver medalist(s)	Yvonne Nauta	(Netherlands)	7	i	4:03.65	120	12
3rd place, bronze medalist(s)	Olga Graf	(Russia)	5	o	4:03.79	105	10.5
4	Martina Sáblíková	(Czech Republic)	8	i	4:03.88	90	9
5	Linda de Vries	(Netherlands)	2	i	4:05.64	75	7.5
6	Antoinette de Jong	(Netherlands)	5	i	4:05.79	45	—
7	Jorien Voorhuis	(Netherlands)	7	o	4:07.06	40	
8	Claudia Pechstein	(Germany)	8	o	4:08.43	36	
9	Katarzyna Bachleda-Curuś	(Poland)	6	i	4:09.09	32	
10	Luiza Złotkowska	(Poland)	3	i	4:10.07	28	
11	Shiho Ishizawa	(Japan)	4	i	4:11.38	24	
12	Ida Njåtun	(Norway)	6	o	4:11.95	21	
13	Nana Takagi	(Japan)	3	o	4:11.99	18	
14	Bente Kraus	(Germany)	1	i	4:13.21	16	
15	Masako Hozumi	(Japan)	4	o	4:13.42	14	
16	Ayaka Kikuchi	(Japan)	2	o	4:15.43	12	
