= 2013–14 ISU Speed Skating World Cup – World Cup 5 – Women's mass start =

The women's mass start race of the 2013–14 ISU Speed Skating World Cup 5, arranged in Eisstadion Inzell, in Inzell, Germany, was held on 8 March 2014.

Claudia Pechstein of Germany won the race, while Janneke Ensing of the Netherlands came second, and Irene Schouten of the Netherlands came third.

== Results ==
The race took place on Sunday, 9 March, scheduled in the afternoon session, at 15:36.

				Race points							
Rank	Name	Nat.	Laps	Split 1	Split 2	Split 3	Finish	Total	Time	WC points	GWC points
1st place, gold medalist(s)	Claudia Pechstein	(Germany)	15			3	31	34		100	10
2nd place, silver medalist(s)	Janneke Ensing	(Netherlands)	15	5	1	5	15	26		80	8
3rd place, bronze medalist(s)	Irene Schouten	(Netherlands)	15		3		10	13		70	7
4	Mariska Huisman	(Netherlands)	15	3		2	5	10		60	6
5	Francesca Lollobrigida	(Italy)	15	2	5		3	10		50	5
6	Ivanie Blondin	(Canada)	15	1	2			3		45	—
7	Maria Lamb	(United States)	15			1	1	2		40	
8	Masako Hozumi	(Japan)	15					0	8:31.75	36	
9	Jelena Peeters	(Belgium)	15					0	8:32.85	32	
10	Saskia Alusalu	(Estonia)	15					0	8:33.63	28	
11	Camilla Hallås-Farestveit	(Norway)	15					0	8:38.76	24	
12	Shoko Fujimura	(Japan)	15					0	8:38.80	21	
13	Isabell Ost	(Germany)	15					0	8:54.06	18	
14	Nana Takagi	(Japan)	10					0	5:54.44	16	
15	Anna Ringsred	(United States)	10					0	5:54.54	14	
15	Luiza Złotkowska	(Poland)	10					0	5:54.54	14	
17	Roxanne Dufter	(Germany)	10					0	5:54.59	10	
