= 2013–14 ISU Speed Skating World Cup – World Cup 5 – Men's 1000 metres =

The men's 1000 metres race of the 2013–14 ISU Speed Skating World Cup 5, arranged in Eisstadion Inzell, in Inzell, Germany, was held on 8 March 2014.

Shani Davis of the United States won, while Stefan Groothuis of the Netherlands came second, and Brian Hansen came third. Mark Tuitert of the Netherlands won the Division B race.

== Results ==
The race took place on Saturday, 8 March, with Division B scheduled in the morning session, at 11:15, and Division A scheduled in the afternoon session, at 15:41.

=== Division A ===
Rank	Name	Nat.	Pair	Lane	Time	WC points	GWC points
1st place, gold medalist(s)	Shani Davis	(United States)	10	i	1:08.70	100	10
2nd place, silver medalist(s)	Stefan Groothuis	(Netherlands)	4	i	1:08.80	80	8
3rd place, bronze medalist(s)	Brian Hansen	(United States)	8	o	1:08.90	70	7
4	Koen Verweij	(Netherlands)	7	o	1:08.98	60	6
5	Zbigniew Bródka	(Poland)	1	o	1:09.22	50	5
6	Denny Morrison	(Canada)	8	i	1:09.30	45	—
7	Kjeld Nuis	(Netherlands)	9	o	1:09.45	40	
8	Nico Ihle	(Germany)	3	o	1:09.54	36	
9	Håvard Holmefjord Lorentzen	(Norway)	6	i	1:09.57	32	
10	Michel Mulder	(Netherlands)	10	o	1:09.88	28	
11	Joey Mantia	(United States)	4	o	1:09.91	24	
12	Aleksey Yesin	(Russia)	5	i	1:09.92	21	
13	Jamie Gregg	(Canada)	5	o	1:10.19	18	
14	Mitchell Whitmore	(United States)	6	o	1:10.23	16	
15	Dmitry Lobkov	(Russia)	3	i	1:10.30	14	
16	Pekka Koskela	(Finland)	2	o	1:10.53	12	
17	Jonathan Garcia	(United States)	1	i	1:10.67	10	
18	Daniel Greig	(Australia)	2	i	1:10.78	8	
19	Denis Kuzin	(Kazakhstan)	9	i	1:10.84	6	
20	Mirko Giacomo Nenzi	(Italy)	7	i	DQ	0	

=== Division B ===
Rank	Name	Nat.	Pair	Lane	Time	WC points
1	Mark Tuitert	(Netherlands)	3	i	1:10.11	25
2	Håvard Bøkko	(Norway)	6	i	1:10.37	19
3	Sverre Lunde Pedersen	(Norway)	2	o	1:10.60	15
4	Fyodor Mezentsev	(Kazakhstan)	9	o	1:10.78	11
5	William Dutton	(Canada)	9	i	1:10.87	8
6	Aleksandr Zhigin	(Kazakhstan)	8	o	1:10.89	6
7	Mikhail Kozlov	(Russia)	2	i	1:10.96	4
8	David Bosa	(Italy)	3	o	1:11.03	2
9	Denis Dressel	(Germany)	8	i	1:11.10	1
10	Konrád Nagy	(Hungary)	1	i	1:11.19	—
11	Hubert Hirschbichler	(Germany)	4	o	1:11.41	
12	Bram Smallenbroek	(Austria)	6	o	1:11.46	
13	Makoto Owada	(Japan)	7	i	1:11.52	
14	Tommi Pulli	(Finland)	5	o	1:12.38	
15	Denis Koval	(Russia)	5	i	1:12.52	
16	Joel Vähä-Salo	(Finland)	4	i	1:12.68	
17	Artyom Kuznetsov	(Russia)	7	o	1:13.03	
