= 2013–14 ISU Speed Skating World Cup – World Cup 6 – Women's 1500 metres =

The women's 1500 metres races of the 2013–14 ISU Speed Skating World Cup 6, arranged in the Thialf arena, in Heerenveen, Netherlands, was held on 14 March 2014.

Ireen Wüst of the Netherlands won the race, while Lotte van Beek of the Netherlands came second, and Yuliya Skokova of Russia came third.

== Result ==
The race took place on Friday, 14 March, scheduled at 16:16.

=== Division A ===
Rank	Name	Nat.	Pair	Lane	Time	WC points	GWC points
1st place, gold medalist(s)	Ireen Wüst	(Netherlands)	9	i	1:53.68	150	15
2nd place, silver medalist(s)	Lotte van Beek	(Netherlands)	8	i	1:54.47	120	12
3rd place, bronze medalist(s)	Yuliya Skokova	(Russia)	8	o	1:56.14	105	10.5
4	Marrit Leenstra	(Netherlands)	6	i	1:56.22	90	9
5	Brittany Bowe	(United States)	9	o	1:56.56	75	7.5
6	Olga Graf	(Russia)	4	i	1:56.72	45	—
7	Jorien Voorhuis	(Netherlands)	3	i	1:57.48	40	
8	Katarzyna Bachleda-Curuś	(Poland)	7	o	1:57.51	36	
9	Ida Njåtun	(Norway)	6	o	1:57.93	32	
10	Natalia Czerwonka	(Poland)	2	i	1:58.01	28	
11	Yekaterina Lobysheva	(Russia)	7	i	1:58.11	24	
12	Diane Valkenburg	(Netherlands)	1	o	1:58.25	21	
13	Luiza Złotkowska	(Poland)	5	o	1:58.38	18	
14	Monique Angermüller	(Germany)	5	i	1:58.71	16	
15	Yekaterina Shikhova	(Russia)	4	o	1:59.67	14	
16	Maki Tabata	(Japan)	3	o	2:00.36	12	
17	Nana Takagi	(Japan)	1	i	2:00.40	10	
18	Ayaka Kikuchi	(Japan)	2	o	2:00.74	8	
