= 2013–14 ISU Speed Skating World Cup – World Cup 5 – Women's 1500 metres =

The women's 1500 metres race of the 2013–14 ISU Speed Skating World Cup 5, arranged in Eisstadion Inzell, in Inzell, Germany, was held on 7 March 2014.

Ireen Wüst of the Netherlands won the race, while Lotte van Beek, also of the Netherlands, came second, and Brittany Bowe of the United States came third. Diane Valkenburg of the Netherlands won the Division B race.

== Results ==
The race took place on Friday, 7 March, with Division B scheduled in the morning session, at 12:52, and Division A scheduled in the afternoon session, at 17:06.

=== Division A ===
Rank	Name	Nat.	Pair	Lane	Time	WC points	GWC points
1st place, gold medalist(s)	Ireen Wüst	(Netherlands)	10	i	1:54.03	100	10
2nd place, silver medalist(s)	Lotte van Beek	(Netherlands)	9	i	1:54.70	80	8
3rd place, bronze medalist(s)	Brittany Bowe	(United States)	10	o	1:55.06	70	7
4	Yuliya Skokova	(Russia)	9	o	1:55.16	60	6
5	Yekaterina Lobysheva	(Russia)	8	o	1:56.58	50	5
6	Martina Sáblíková	(Czech Republic)	4	i	1:56.69	45	—
7	Jorien Voorhuis	(Netherlands)	2	i	1:56.74	40	
8	Olga Graf	(Russia)	5	o	1:56.76	36	
9	Marrit Leenstra	(Netherlands)	7	i	1:56.79	32	
10	Monique Angermüller	(Germany)	6	i	1:57.12	28	
11	Heather Richardson	(United States)	5	i	1:57.162	24	
12	Luiza Złotkowska	(Poland)	7	o	1:57.169	21	
13	Katarzyna Bachleda-Curuś	(Poland)	8	i	1:57.57	18	
14	Natalia Czerwonka	(Poland)	2	o	1:58.00	16	
15	Karolína Erbanová	(Czech Republic)	4	o	1:58.08	14	
16	Yekaterina Shikhova	(Russia)	6	o	1:58.25	12	
17	Yevgeniya Dmitriyeva	(Russia)	1	o	1:58.77	10	
18	Maki Tabata	(Japan)	3	i	1:58.81	8	
19	Ayaka Kikuchi	(Japan)	3	o	1:58.84	6	
20	Nana Takagi	(Japan)	1	i	1:59.08	5	

=== Division B ===
Rank	Name	Nat.	Pair	Lane	Time	WC points
1	Diane Valkenburg	(Netherlands)	4	i	1:57.01	25
2	Miho Takagi	(Japan)	4	o	1:59.40	19
3	Jelena Peeters	(Belgium)	7	i	1:59.82	15
4	Misaki Oshigiri	(Japan)	3	i	2:00.67	11
5	Anna Ringsred	(United States)	3	o	2:01.42	8
6	Isabell Ost	(Germany)	2	i	2:01.47	6
7	Mari Hemmer	(Norway)	7	o	2:02.00	4
8	Francesca Lollobrigida	(Italy)	2	o	2:02.14	2
9	Katarzyna Woźniak	(Poland)	6	i	2:02.90	1
10	Camilla Hallås Farestveit	(Norway)	5	i	2:03.08	—
11	Johanna Östlund	(Sweden)	6	o	2:06.12	
12	Saskia Alusalu	(Estonia)	1	i	2:06.71	
13	Roxanne Dufter	(Germany)	5	o	DNF	
