= 2013–14 ISU Speed Skating World Cup – World Cup 6 – Men's 1500 metres =

The men's 1500 metres races of the 2013–14 ISU Speed Skating World Cup 6, arranged in the Thialf arena, in Heerenveen, Netherlands, was held on 15 March 2014.

Denis Yuskov of Russia won the race, while Koen Verweij of the Netherlands came second, and Zbigniew Bródka of Poland came third.

== Result ==
The race took place on Saturday, 15 March, scheduled at 15:22.

=== Division A ===
Rank	Name	Nat.	Pair	Lane	Time	WC points	GWC points
1st place, gold medalist(s)	Denis Yuskov	(Russia)	9	o	1:45.55	150	15
2nd place, silver medalist(s)	Koen Verweij	(Netherlands)	10	o	1:45.60	120	12
3rd place, bronze medalist(s)	Zbigniew Bródka	(Poland)	9	i	1:45.81	105	10.5
4	Mark Tuitert	(Netherlands)	5	o	1:45.82	90	9
5	Shani Davis	(United States)	10	i	1:46.02	75	7.5
6	Håvard Bøkko	(Norway)	5	i	1:46.10	45	—
7	Brian Hansen	(United States)	8	i	1:46.11	40	
8	Bart Swings	(Belgium)	3	o	1:46.44	36	
9	Denny Morrison	(Canada)	7	i	1:46.49	32	
10	Kjeld Nuis	(Netherlands)	6	o	1:46.89	28	
11	Stefan Groothuis	(Netherlands)	2	i	1:47.08	24	
12	Sverre Lunde Pedersen	(Norway)	8	o	1:47.50	21	
13	Konrad Niedźwiedzki	(Poland)	6	i	1:47.54	18	
14	Jan Szymański	(Poland)	3	i	1:47.96	16	
15	Aleksey Yesin	(Russia)	2	o	1:48.01	14	
16	Mirko Giacomo Nenzi	(Italy)	1	i	1:49.02	12	
17	Håvard Holmefjord Lorentzen	(Norway)	4	o	1:49.27	10	
18	Haralds Silovs	(Latvia)	4	i	1:49.40	8	
19	Rhian Ket	(Netherlands)	7	o	1:50.08	6	
