= 2013–14 ISU Speed Skating World Cup – World Cup 6 – Men's 1000 metres =

The men's 1000 metres races of the 2013–14 ISU Speed Skating World Cup 6, arranged in the Thialf arena, in Heerenveen, Netherlands, was held on 14 March 2014.

Denny Morrison of Canada won the race, while Shani Davis of the United States came second, and Kjeld Nuis of the Netherlands came third.

== Result ==
The race took place on Friday, 14 March, scheduled at 17:12.

=== Division A ===
| Rank | Name | Nat. | Pair | Lane | Time | WC points | GWC points |
|---|---|---|---|---|---|---|---|
| 1st place, gold medalist(s) | Denny Morrison | (Canada) | 7 | o | 1:08.91 | 150 | 15 |
| 2nd place, silver medalist(s) | Shani Davis | (United States) | 9 | i | 1:09.13 | 120 | 12 |
| 3rd place, bronze medalist(s) | Kjeld Nuis | (Netherlands) | 8 | o | 1:09.25 | 105 | 10.5 |
| 4 | Mark Tuitert | (Netherlands) | 1 | i | 1:09.33 | 90 | 9 |
| 5 | Koen Verweij | (Netherlands) | 6 | i | 1:09.40 | 75 | 7.5 |
| 6 | Stefan Groothuis | (Netherlands) | 6 | o | 1:09.42 | 45 | — |
| 7 | Michel Mulder | (Netherlands) | 9 | o | 1:09.53 | 40 | |
| 8 | Brian Hansen | (United States) | 8 | i | 1:09.69 | 36 | |
| 9 | Mirko Giacomo Nenzi | (Italy) | 5 | o | 1:09.71 | 32 | |
| 10 | Håvard Holmefjord Lorentzen | (Norway) | 5 | i | 1:09.92 | 28 | |
| 11 | Mitchell Whitmore | (United States) | 4 | o | 1:10.09 | 24 | |
| 12 | Aleksey Yesin | (Russia) | 4 | i | 1:10.15 | 21 | |
| 13 | Pekka Koskela | (Finland) | 2 | i | 1:11.12 | 18 | |
| 14 | Jamie Gregg | (Canada) | 3 | i | 1:11.31 | 16 | |
| 15 | Daniel Greig | (Australia) | 2 | o | 1:11.42 | 14 | |
| 16 | Dmitry Lobkov | (Russia) | 3 | o | 1:11.70 | 12 | |
| 17 | Denis Kuzin | (Kazakhstan) | 7 | i | 1:56.24 | 10 | |
