= 2013–14 ISU Speed Skating World Cup – World Cup 6 – Women's team pursuit =

The women's team pursuit race of the 2013–14 ISU Speed Skating World Cup 6, arranged in the Thialf arena, in Heerenveen, Netherlands, was held on 16 March 2014.

The Dutch team took their fourth consecutive victory for the season, while the Polish team came second, and the Japanese team came third.

== Results ==
The race took place on Sunday, 16 March, in the afternoon session, scheduled at 17:32.

Rank	Country	Skaters	Pair	Lane	Time	WC points
1st place, gold medalist(s)	Netherlands	Lotte van Beek; Marrit Leenstra; Linda de Vries	2	i	2:59.65	150
2nd place, silver medalist(s)	Poland	Katarzyna Bachleda-Curuś; Natalia Czerwonka; Luiza Złotkowska	2	o	3:01.44	120
3rd place, bronze medalist(s)	Japan	Ayaka Kikuchi; Maki Tabata; Nana Takagi	1	o	3:04.38	105
4	Canada	Ivanie Blondin; Kali Christ; Kaylin Irvine	1	i	3:04.81	90
