= 2013–14 ISU Speed Skating World Cup – World Cup 5 – Women's 500 metres =

The women's 500 metres races of the 2013–14 ISU Speed Skating World Cup 5, arranged in Eisstadion Inzell, in Inzell, Germany, was held on 7 and 8 March 2014.

Heather Richardson of the United States won race one, while Judith Hesse of Germany came second, and Olga Fatkulina of Russia came third.

Race two was also won by Richardson, while Fatkulina improved to second place, and Jenny Wolf of Germany placed third.

== Race 1 ==
Race one took place on Friday, 7 March, scheduled in the afternoon session, at 15:00. Due to the limited number of competitors, there was no Division B.

=== Division A ===
Rank	Name	Nat.	Pair	Lane	Time	WC points	GWC points
1st place, gold medalist(s)	Heather Richardson	(United States)	14	o	37.85	100	5
2nd place, silver medalist(s)	Judith Hesse	(Germany)	10	o	37.86	80	4
3rd place, bronze medalist(s)	Olga Fatkulina	(Russia)	14	i	37.89	70	3.5
4	Nao Kodaira	(Japan)	13	o	37.90	60	3
5	Jenny Wolf	(Germany)	13	i	37.95	50	2.5
6	Margot Boer	(Netherlands)	12	i	38.11	45	—
7	Laurine van Riessen	(Netherlands)	9	o	38.132	40	
8	Brittany Bowe	(United States)	11	i	38.135	36	
9	Thijsje Oenema	(Netherlands)	12	o	38.17	32	
10	Karolína Erbanová	(Czech Republic)	8	o	38.27	28	
11	Miyako Sumiyoshi	(Japan)	10	i	38.28	24	
12	Maki Tsuji	(Japan)	11	o	38.48	21	
13	Anice Das	(Netherlands)	8	i	38.66	18	
14	Denise Roth	(Germany)	6	i	38.84	16	
15	Kaylin Irvine	(Canada)	7	o	38.87	14	
16	Yekaterina Shikhova	(Russia)	5	o	38.89	12	
17	Annette Gerritsen	(Netherlands)	5	i	38.99	10	
18	Yuliya Skokova	(Russia)	4	i	39.02	8	
19	Sugar Todd	(United States)	6	o	39.09	6	
20	Jennifer Plate	(Germany)	7	i	39.17	5	
21	Angelina Golikova	(Russia)	2	i	39.24	4	
22	Erina Kamiya	(Japan)	9	i	39.31	3	
23	Elina Risku	(Finland)	3	i	39.40	2	
24	Yvonne Daldossi	(Italy)	4	o	39.58	1	
25	Kelly Gunther	(United States)	2	o	40.21	—	
26	Olga Graf	(Russia)	3	o	40.30		
27	Katja Franzen	(Germany)	1	o	40.43		
28	Anna Ringsred	(United States)	1	i	40.49		

== Race 2 ==
Race two took place on Saturday, 8 March, scheduled in the afternoon session, at 13:30. Due to the limited number of competitors, there was no Division B.

=== Division A ===
Rank	Name	Nat.	Pair	Lane	Time	WC points	GWC points
1st place, gold medalist(s)	Heather Richardson	(United States)	12	i	37.70	100	5
2nd place, silver medalist(s)	Olga Fatkulina	(Russia)	12	o	37.84	80	4
3rd place, bronze medalist(s)	Jenny Wolf	(Germany)	11	o	37.89	70	3.5
4	Nao Kodaira	(Japan)	10	i	37.91	60	3
5	Thijsje Oenema	(Netherlands)	8	i	38.01	50	2.5
6	Laurine van Riessen	(Netherlands)	9	i	38.24	45	—
7	Judith Hesse	(Germany)	11	i	38.25	40	
8	Margot Boer	(Netherlands)	10	o	38.300	36	
9	Karolína Erbanová	(Czech Republic)	7	i	38.303	32	
10	Miyako Sumiyoshi	(Japan)	9	o	38.32	28	
11	Maki Tsuji	(Japan)	6	i	38.54	24	
12	Anice Das	(Netherlands)	8	o	38.63	21	
13	Kaylin Irvine	(Canada)	5	i	38.84	18	
14	Annette Gerritsen	(Netherlands)	6	o	38.92	16	
15	Sugar Todd	(United States)	4	i	38.95	14	
16	Denise Roth	(Germany)	7	o	39.03	12	
17	Angelina Golikova	(Russia)	4	o	39.04	10	
18	Jennifer Plate	(Germany)	5	o	39.15	8	
19	Erina Kamiya	(Japan)	3	o	39.37	6	
20	Kelly Gunther	(United States)	2	i	39.87	5	
21	Elina Risku	(Finland)	2	o	39.88	4	
22	Yvonne Daldossi	(Italy)	3	i	39.89	3	
23	Katja Franzen	(Germany)	1	i	40.46	2	
