= 2013–14 ISU Speed Skating World Cup – World Cup 2 – Men's 1000 metres =

The men's 1000 metres race of the 2013–14 ISU Speed Skating World Cup 2, arranged in the Utah Olympic Oval, in Salt Lake City, United States, was held on November 16, 2013.

Shani Davis of the United States won, while Kjeld Nuis of the Netherlands came second, and Brian Hansen of the United States came third. Konrad Niedźwiedzki of Poland won Division B.

== Results ==
The race took place on Saturday, November 16, with Division B scheduled in the morning session, at 10:18, and Division A scheduled in the afternoon session, at 14:01.

=== Division A ===
| Rank | Name | Nat. | Pair | Lane | Time | WC points | GWC points |
|---|---|---|---|---|---|---|---|
| 1st place, gold medalist(s) | Shani Davis | (United States) | 10 | i | 1:06.88 | 100 | 10 |
| 2nd place, silver medalist(s) | Kjeld Nuis | (Netherlands) | 10 | o | 1:07.02 | 80 | 8 |
| 3rd place, bronze medalist(s) | Brian Hansen | (United States) | 9 | i | 1:07.03 | 70 | 7 |
| 4 | Denny Morrison | (Canada) | 6 | o | 1:07.44 | 60 | 6 |
| 5 | Michel Mulder | (Netherlands) | 7 | o | 1:07.46 | 50 | 5 |
| 6 | Mitchell Whitmore | (United States) | 3 | i | 1:07.52 | 45 | — |
| 7 | Jamie Gregg | (Canada) | 7 | i | 1:07.93 | 40 | |
| 8 | Denis Kuzin | (Kazakhstan) | 9 | o | 1:07.99 | 36 | |
| 9 | Koen Verweij | (Netherlands) | 8 | i | 1:08.01 | 32 | |
| 10 | Pekka Koskela | (Finland) | 2 | i | 1:08.07 | 28 | |
| 11 | Aleksey Yesin | (Russia) | 4 | i | 1:08.29 | 24 | |
| 12 | Mika Poutala | (Finland) | 3 | o | 1:08.30 | 21 | |
| 13 | Dmitry Lobkov | (Russia) | 1 | i | 1:08.32 | 18 | |
| 14 | Sjoerd de Vries | (Netherlands) | 5 | i | 1:08.34 | 16 | |
| 15 | Marko Giacomo Nenzi | (Italy) | 5 | o | 1:08.87 | 14 | |
| 16 | Daniel Greig | (Australia) | 4 | o | 1:12.92 | 12 | |
| 17 | Stefan Groothuis | (Netherlands) | 6 | i | DQ | | |
| 17 | Nico Ihle | (Germany) | 1 | o | DQ | | |
| 17 | Trevor Marsicano | (United States) | 2 | o | DQ | | |
| 20 | Mo Tae-bum | (South Korea) | 8 | o | DNS | | |

=== Division B ===
| Rank | Name | Nat. | Pair | Lane | Time | WC points |
|---|---|---|---|---|---|---|
| 1 | Konrad Niedźwiedzki | (Poland) | 16 | i | 1:07.90 | 25 |
| 2 | Håvard Holmefjord Lorentzen | (Norway) | 17 | o | 1:07.95 | 19 |
| 3 | Haralds Silovs | (Latvia) | 16 | o | 1:08.22 | 15 |
| 4 | Zbigniew Bródka | (Poland) | 15 | o | 1:08.29 | 11 |
| 5 | Gilmore Junio | (Canada) | 17 | i | 1:08.39 | 8 |
| 6 | Kim Tae-jun | (South Korea) | 13 | o | 1:08.54 | 6 |
| 7 | Tyler Derraugh | (Canada) | 18 | i | 1:08.78 | 4 |
| 8 | Sung Ching-Yang | (Chinese Taipei) | 10 | i | 1:08.83 | 2 |
| 9 | Fyodor Mezentsev | (Kazakhstan) | 14 | o | 1:08.84 | 1 |
| 10 | Joey Mantia | (United States) | 15 | i | 1:08.88 | — |
| 11 | Laurent Dubreuil | (Canada) | 3 | i | 1:09.03 | |
| 12 | Benjamin Macé | (France) | 13 | i | 1:09.05 | |
| 13 | Aleksandr Zhigin | (Kazakhstan) | 12 | i | 1:09.07 | |
| 14 | Daichi Yamanaka | (Japan) | 8 | i | 1:09.30 | |
| 15 | Artyom Kuznetsov | (Russia) | 2 | i | 1:09.466 | |
| 15 | Makoto Owada | (Japan) | 4 | o | 1:09.466 | |
| 17 | Tian Guojun | (China) | 12 | o | 1:09.50 | |
| 18 | Espen Aarnes Hvammen | (Norway) | 3 | o | 1:09.68 | |
| 19 | Bram Smallenbroek | (Austria) | 2 | o | 1:09.76 | |
| 20 | David Andersson | (Sweden) | 10 | o | 1:10.07 | |
| 21 | Sun Longjiang | (China) | 7 | o | 1:10.100 | |
| 22 | Denny Ihle | (Germany) | 1 | i | 1:10.104 | |
| 23 | Jan Daldossi | (Italy) | 9 | o | 1:10.14 | |
| 24 | Vitaly Mikhailov | (Belarus) | 6 | i | 1:10.25 | |
| 25 | Denis Dressel | (Germany) | 18 | o | 1:10.41 | |
| 26 | Taro Kondo | (Japan) | 8 | o | 1:10.44 | |
| 27 | Denis Koval | (Russia) | 11 | o | 1:10.50 | |
| 28 | Joel Vähä-Salo | (Finland) | 5 | i | 1:11.13 | |
| 29 | Marius Christian Paraschivoiu | (Romania) | 6 | o | 1:11.17 | |
| 30 | Mark Jackson | (New Zealand) | 5 | o | 1:11.58 | |
| 31 | Darsil Essamambo | (Kazakhstan) | 4 | i | 1:11.81 | |
| 32 | Lee Kang-seok | (South Korea) | 9 | i | 1:13.14 | |
| 33 | Ben Southee | (Australia) | 1 | o | 1:14.19 | |
| 34 | Tommi Pulli | (Finland) | 7 | i | 1:49.85 | |
| 35 | Igor Bogolubsky | (Russia) | 11 | i | DQ | |
| 35 | Christoffer Fagerli Rukke | (Norway) | 14 | i | DQ | |
