= 2013–14 ISU Speed Skating World Cup – World Cup 6 – Women's 500 metres =

The women's 500 metres races of the 2013–14 ISU Speed Skating World Cup 6, arranged in the Thialf arena, in Heerenveen, Netherlands, was held on 15 and 16 March 2014.

Olga Fatkulina of Russia won both the Saturday and the Sunday race. On Saturday, Heather Richardson of the United States came second, while Nao Kodaira of Japan came third.

On Sunday, Jenny Wolf of Germany came second, and Richardson lost one place down to third.

== Race 1 ==
Race one took place on Saturday, 15 March, scheduled at 16:18.

=== Division A ===
Rank	Name	Nat.	Pair	Lane	Time	WC points	GWC points
1st place, gold medalist(s)	Olga Fatkulina	(Russia)	9	o	37.67	150	7.5
2nd place, silver medalist(s)	Heather Richardson	(United States)	9	i	37.79	120	6
3rd place, bronze medalist(s)	Nao Kodaira	(Japan)	8	o	37.95	105	5.25
4	Jenny Wolf	(Germany)	8	i	38.03	90	4.5
5	Margot Boer	(Netherlands)	7	i	38.05	75	3.75
6	Laurine van Riessen	(Netherlands)	4	i	38.14	45	—
7	Miyako Sumiyoshi	(Japan)	5	o	38.20	40	
8	Judith Hesse	(Germany)	6	i	38.43	36	
9	Karolína Erbanová	(Czech Republic)	3	i	38.53	32	
10	Brittany Bowe	(United States)	6	o	38.59	28	
11	Anice Das	(Netherlands)	4	o	38.61	24	
12	Thijsje Oenema	(Netherlands)	7	o	38.680	21	
13	Maki Tsuji	(Japan)	5	i	38.681	18	
14	Kaylin Irvine	(Canada)	1	i	39.08	16	
15	Erina Kamiya	(Japan)	3	o	39.12	14	
16	Mayon Kuipers	(Netherlands)	2	o	39.14	12	
17	Jennifer Plate	(Germany)	2	i	39.47	10	

== Race 2 ==
Race two took place on Sunday, 16 March, scheduled at 13:30.

=== Division A ===
Rank	Name	Nat.	Pair	Lane	Time	WC points	GWC points
1st place, gold medalist(s)	Olga Fatkulina	(Russia)	9	o	37.86	150	7.5
2nd place, silver medalist(s)	Jenny Wolf	(Germany)	8	i	38.00	120	6
3rd place, bronze medalist(s)	Heather Richardson	(United States)	9	i	38.04	105	5.25
4	Nao Kodaira	(Japan)	8	o	38.13	90	4.5
5	Margot Boer	(Netherlands)	7	i	38.201	75	3.75
6	Laurine van Riessen	(Netherlands)	4	i	38.207	45	—
7	Thijsje Oenema	(Netherlands)	7	o	38.23	40	
8	Miyako Sumiyoshi	(Japan)	5	o	38.353	36	
9	Karolína Erbanová	(Czech Republic)	3	i	38.359	32	
10	Brittany Bowe	(United States)	6	o	38.47	28	
11	Judith Hesse	(Germany)	6	i	38.48	24	
12	Maki Tsuji	(Japan)	5	i	38.70	21	
13	Mayon Kuipers	(Netherlands)	2	o	38.92	18	
14	Kaylin Irvine	(Canada)	1	i	38.98	16	
15	Erina Kamiya	(Japan)	3	o	39.03	14	
16	Jennifer Plate	(Germany)	2	i	39.83	12	
17	Anice Das	(Netherlands)	4	o	1:16.88	10	
