= 2013–14 ISU Speed Skating World Cup – World Cup 5 – Women's 3000 metres =

The women's 3000 metres race of the 2013–14 ISU Speed Skating World Cup 5, arranged in Eisstadion Inzell, in Inzell, Germany, was held on 8 March 2014.

Ireen Wüst of the Netherlands won, while Martina Sáblíková of the Czech Republic came second, and Yvonne Nauta of the Netherlands came third. Annouk van der Weijden of the Netherlands won the Division B race.

== Results ==
The race took place on Saturday, 8 March, with Division B scheduled in the morning session, at 10:27, and Division A scheduled in the afternoon session, at 14:39.

=== Division A ===
Rank	Name	Nat.	Pair	Lane	Time	WC points	GWC points
1st place, gold medalist(s)	Ireen Wüst	(Netherlands)	6	o	4:01.52	100	10
2nd place, silver medalist(s)	Martina Sáblíková	(Czech Republic)	8	i	4:04.00	80	8
3rd place, bronze medalist(s)	Yvonne Nauta	(Netherlands)	5	i	4:04.44	70	7
4	Olga Graf	(Russia)	4	o	4:04.87	60	6
5	Jorien Voorhuis	(Netherlands)	7	o	4:06.34	50	5
6	Ida Njåtun	(Norway)	6	i	4:06.43	45	—
7	Claudia Pechstein	(Germany)	8	o	4:07.11	40	
8	Katarzyna Bachleda-Curuś	(Poland)	7	i	4:07.54	35	
9	Shiho Ishizawa	(Japan)	5	o	4:10.21	30	
10	Bente Kraus	(Germany)	2	o	4:10.66	25	
11	Luiza Złotkowska	(Poland)	3	o	4:11.05	21	
12	Ivanie Blondin	(Canada)	1	o	4:11.91	18	
13	Ayaka Kikuchi	(Japan)	2	i	4:12.58	16	
14	Natalia Czerwonka	(Poland)	1	i	4:12.99	14	
15	Nana Takagi	(Japan)	3	i	4:13.89	12	
16	Masako Hozumi	(Japan)	4	i	4:14.51	10	

=== Division B ===
Rank	Name	Nat.	Pair	Lane	Time	WC points
1	Annouk van der Weijden	(Netherlands)	9	i	4:07.07	32
2	Yuliya Skokova	(Russia)	6	o	4:08.77	27
3	Jelena Peeters	(Belgium)	7	o	4:10.75	23
4	Mari Hemmer	(Norway)	8	i	4:11.51	19
5	Francesca Lollobrigida	(Italy)	7	i	4:12.92	15
6	Anna Chernova	(Russia)	6	i	4:13.32	11
7	Yevgeniya Dmitriyeva	(Russia)	3	o	4:13.65	9
8	Isabell Ost	(Germany)	4	i	4:13.86	7
9	Stephanie Beckert	(Germany)	9	o	4:14.39	6
10	Yekaterina Shikhova	(Russia)	1	i	4:14.83	5
11	Shoko Fujimura	(Japan)	1	o	4:14.89	4
12	Maria Lamb	(United States)	5	o	4:16.51	3
13	Anna Ringsred	(United States)	3	i	4:17.23	2
14	Marije Joling	(Netherlands)	2	o	4:17.93	1
15	Jennifer Bay	(Germany)	5	i	4:18.38	—
16	Saskia Alusalu	(Estonia)	2	i	4:18.69	
17	Katarzyna Woźniak	(Poland)	8	o	4:19.09	
18	Camilla Hallås Farestveit	(Norway)	4	o	4:20.42	
