= 2013–14 ISU Speed Skating World Cup – World Cup 6 – Women's 1000 metres =

The women's 1000 metres races of the 2013–14 ISU Speed Skating World Cup 6, arranged in the Thialf arena, in Heerenveen, Netherlands, was held on 16 March 2014.

Ireen Wüst, Margot Boer and Lotte van Beek made it an all-Dutch podium, placing first, second and third, respectively.

== Result ==
The race took place on Sunday, 16 March, scheduled at 17:12.

=== Division A ===
Rank	Name	Nat.	Pair	Lane	Time	WC points	GWC points
1st place, gold medalist(s)	Ireen Wüst	(Netherlands)	4	i	1:14.63	150	15
2nd place, silver medalist(s)	Margot Boer	(Netherlands)	6	i	1:14.92	120	12
3rd place, bronze medalist(s)	Lotte van Beek	(Netherlands)	7	o	1:15.09	105	10.5
4	Brittany Bowe	(United States)	8	o	1:15.10	90	9
5	Heather Richardson	(United States)	8	i	1:15.46	75	7.5
6	Marrit Leenstra	(Netherlands)	4	o	1:15.60	45	—
7	Karolína Erbanová	(Czech Republic)	6	o	1:15.89	40	
8	Yuliya Skokova	(Russia)	5	o	1:15.94	36	
9	Olga Fatkulina	(Russia)	7	i	1:15.97	32	
10	Yekaterina Lobysheva	(Russia)	1	i	1:16.05	28	
11	Monique Angermüller	(Germany)	3	i	1:16.14	24	
12	Laurine van Riessen	(Netherlands)	3	o	1:16.24	21	
13	Kaylin Irvine	(Canada)	2	i	1:16.45	18	
14	Nao Kodaira	(Japan)	5	i	1:16.75	16	
15	Miyako Sumiyoshi	(Japan)	1	o	1:17.29	14	
16	Gabriele Hirschbichler	(Germany)	2	o	1:18.22	12	
