= 2013–14 ISU Speed Skating World Cup – World Cup 2 – Women's 1000 metres =

The women's 1000 metres race of the 2013–14 ISU Speed Skating World Cup 2, arranged in the Utah Olympic Oval, in Salt Lake City, United States, was held on November 17, 2013.

Brittany Bowe of the United States won the race, setting a new world record of 1:12.58 in the process, with fellow American Heather Richardson finishing in second place, only 3/100 of a second behind, and Ireen Wüst of the Netherlands in third place. Richardson, who skated in a later pair, also went below the old record. Kim Hyun-yung of South Korea broke the girls' world record with a time of 1:14.95. Yekaterina Malysheva of Russia won the Division B race.

== Results ==
The race took place on Sunday, November 17, with Division B scheduled in the morning session, at 11:27, and Division A scheduled in the afternoon session, at 14:04.

=== Division A ===
Rank	Name	Nat.	Pair	Lane	Time	WC points	GWC points
1st place, gold medalist(s)	Brittany Bowe	(United States)	9	i	1:12.58	100	10
2nd place, silver medalist(s)	Heather Richardson	(United States)	10	i	1:12.61	80	8
3rd place, bronze medalist(s)	Ireen Wüst	(Netherlands)	8	o	1:13.33	70	7
4	Olga Fatkulina	(Russia)	9	o	1:13.40	60	6
5	Margot Boer	(Netherlands)	8	i	1:13.77	50	5
6	Zhang Hong	(China)	1	o	1:13.82	45	—
7	Nao Kodaira	(Japan)	5	i	1:13.98	40	
8	Wang Beixing	(China)	7	i	1:14.06	36	
9	Lotte van Beek	(Netherlands)	10	o	1:14.13	32	
10	Monique Angermüller	(Germany)	4	i	1:14.15	28	
11	Yekaterina Lobysheva	(Russia)	5	o	1:14.20	24	
12	Christine Nesbitt	(Canada)	6	i	1:14.22	21	
13	Karolína Erbanová	(Czech Republic)	3	i	1:14.66	18	
14	Yu Jing	(China)	4	o	1:14.91	16	
15	Kim Hyun-yung	(South Korea)	6	o	1:14.953	14	
16	Yekaterina Shikhova	(Russia)	2	i	1:14.959	12	
17	Gabriele Hirschbichler	(Austria)	1	i	1:15.29	10	
18	Yuliya Skokova	(Russia)	3	o	1:15.33	8	
19	Judith Hesse	(Germany)	7	o	1:15.38	6	
20	Luiza Złotkowska	(Poland)	2	o	1:16.28	5	

=== Division B ===
Rank	Name	Nat.	Pair	Lane	Time	WC points
1	Yekaterina Malysheva	(Russia)	13	i	1:14.32	25
2	Manon Kamminga	(Netherlands)	16	i	1:14.34	19
3	Laurine van Riessen	(Netherlands)	17	o	1:15.05	15
5	Elli Ochowicz	(United States)	12	i	1:15.54	8
4	Vanessa Bittner	(Austria)	16	o	1:15.36	11
6	Brittany Schussler	(Canada)	2	i	1:15.57	6
7	Yekaterina Aydova	(Russia)	17	i	1:15.68	4
8	Erina Kamiya	(Japan)	13	o	1:15.85	2
9	Miho Takagi	(Japan)	10	i	1:15.96	1
10	Kaylin Irvine	(Canada)	14	o	1:16.01	—
11	Jenny Wolf	(Germany)	2	o	1:16.10	
12	Katarzyna Bachleda-Curuś	(Poland)	1	i	1:16.110	
13	Kali Christ	(Canada)	12	o	1:16.119	
14	Ida Njåtun	(Norway)	10	o	1:16.12	
15	Yuki Matsuda	(Japan)	15	i	1:16.19	
16	Sugar Todd	(United States)	9	i	1:16.84	
17	Maki Tsuji	(Japan)	14	i	1:16.88	
18	Ahn Jee-min	(South Korea)	7	i	1:16.96	
19	Qi Shuai	(China)	7	o	1:16.99	
20	Rebekah Bradford	(United States)	8	i	1:17.08	
21	Francesca Bettrone	(Italy)	9	o	1:17.12	
22	Lee Bo-ra	(South Korea)	11	o	1:17.31	
23	Kaitlyn McGregor	(Switzerland)	8	o	1:17.53	
24	Jennifer Plate	(Germany)	11	i	1:17.66	
25	Heather McLean	(Canada)	4	o	1:17.96	
26	Johanna Östlund	(Sweden)	5	o	1:18.01	
27	Paola Simionato	(Italy)	6	i	1:18.18	
28	Ji Jia	(China)	15	o	1:18.22	
29	Tatyana Mikhailova	(Belarus)	5	i	1:18.29	
30	Elina Risku	(Finland)	3	i	1:18.46	
31	Yvonne Daldossi	(Italy)	3	o	1:18.87	
32	Tatyana Sokirko	(Kazakhstan)	4	i	1:20.91	
33	Ágota Lykovcán	(Hungary)	6	o	DQ	
