= 2013–14 ISU Speed Skating World Cup – World Cup 6 – Women's mass start =

The women's mass start race of the 2013–14 ISU Speed Skating World Cup 6, arranged in the Thialf arena, in Heerenveen, Netherlands, was held on 14 March 2014.

Francesca Lollobrigida of Italy won the race, while Irene Schouten of the Netherlands came second, and Ivanie Blondin of Canada came third.

== Results ==
The race took place on Friday, 14 March, scheduled at 18:05.

				Race points							
Rank	Name	Nat.	Laps	Split 1	Split 2	Split 3	Finish	Total	Time	WC points	GWC points
1st place, gold medalist(s)	Francesca Lollobrigida	(Italy)	15		3	1	31	35		150	15
2nd place, silver medalist(s)	Irene Schouten	(Netherlands)	15		1		15	16		120	12
3rd place, bronze medalist(s)	Ivanie Blondin	(Canada)	15		2	5	5	12		105	10.5
4	Mariska Huisman	(Netherlands)	15	5	5	2		12		90	9
5	Janneke Ensing	(Netherlands)	15	1			10	11		75	7.5
6	Claudia Pechstein	(Germany)	15	3	1	3		7		45	—
7	Maria Lamb	(United States)	15	2			3	5		40	
8	Jelena Peeters	(Belgium)	15				1	1		36	
9	Masako Hozumi	(Japan)	15			1		1		32	
