= 2013–14 ISU Speed Skating World Cup – World Cup 5 – Women's 1000 metres =

The women's 1000 metres race of the 2013–14 ISU Speed Skating World Cup 5, arranged in Eisstadion Inzell, in Inzell, Germany, was held on 9 March 2014.

Heather Richardson of the United States won, while Brittany Bowe of the United States came second, and Olga Fatkulina came third. Miyako Sumiyoshi of Japan won the Division B race.

== Results ==
The race took place on Sunday, 9 March, with Division B scheduled in the morning session, at 10:57, and Division A scheduled in the afternoon session, at 13:57.

=== Division A ===
Rank	Name	Nat.	Pair	Lane	Time	WC points	GWC points
1st place, gold medalist(s)	Heather Richardson	(United States)	10	i	1:14.87	100	10
2nd place, silver medalist(s)	Brittany Bowe	(United States)	10	o	1:15.26	80	8
3rd place, bronze medalist(s)	Olga Fatkulina	(Russia)	9	i	1:15.34	70	7
4	Margot Boer	(Netherlands)	8	i	1:15.40	60	6
5	Karolína Erbanová	(Czech Republic)	7	i	1:15.52	50	5
6	Marrit Leenstra	(Netherlands)	4	i	1:15.61	45	—
7	Yuliya Skokova	(Russia)	7	o	1:15.63	40	
8	Lotte van Beek	(Netherlands)	9	o	1:15.66	36	
9	Laurine van Riessen	(Netherlands)	5	i	1:15.73	32	
10	Monique Angermüller	(Germany)	6	i	1:16.12	28	
11	Thijsje Oenema	(Netherlands)	2	i	1:16.25	24	
12	Yekaterina Lobysheva	(Russia)	4	o	1:16.38	21	
13	Kaylin Irvine	(Canada)	6	o	1:16.83	18	
14	Nao Kodaira	(Japan)	8	o	1:17.11	16	
15	Natalia Czerwonka	(Poland)	1	o	1:17.27	14	
16	Gabriele Hirschbichler	(Germany)	5	o	1:17.58	12	
17	Miho Takagi	(Japan)	3	o	1:17.72	10	
18	Sugar Todd	(United States)	2	o	1:18.03	8	
19	Maki Tsuji	(Japan)	3	i	1:18.40	6	
20	Erina Kamiya	(Japan)	1	i	1:19.30	5	

=== Division B ===
Rank	Name	Nat.	Pair	Lane	Time	WC points
1	Miyako Sumiyoshi	(Japan)	2	i	1:17.56	25
2	Kelly Gunther	(United States)	2	o	1:19.22	19
3	Roxanne Dufter	(Germany)	3	o	1:20.14	15
4	Angelina Golikova	(Russia)	1	i	1:20.30	11
5	Katja Franzen	(Germany)	1	o	1:21.41	8
6	Elina Risku	(Finland)	3	i	1:21.52	6
