= 2013–14 ISU Speed Skating World Cup – World Cup 6 – Men's 5000 metres =

The men's 5000 metres races of the 2013–14 ISU Speed Skating World Cup 6, arranged in the Thialf arena, in Heerenveen, Netherlands, was held on 16 March 2014.

Jorrit Bergsma of the Netherlands won the race, while Jan Blokhuijsen of the Netherlands came second, and Aleksandr Rumyantsev of Russia came third.

== Result ==
The race took place on Saturday, 16 March, scheduled at 14:13.

=== Division A ===
Rank	Name	Nat.	Pair	Lane	Time	WC points	GWC points
1st place, gold medalist(s)	Jorrit Bergsma	(Netherlands)	6	i	6:13.80	150	15
2nd place, silver medalist(s)	Jan Blokhuijsen	(Netherlands)	4	o	6:19.03	120	12
3rd place, bronze medalist(s)	Aleksandr Rumyantsev	(Russia)	3	o	6:25.06	105	10.5
4	Patrick Beckert	(Germany)	5	i	6:25.31	90	9
5	Douwe de Vries	(Netherlands)	4	i	6:26.03	75	7.5
6	Håvard Bøkko	(Norway)	2	i	6:26.47	45	—
7	Sverre Lunde Pedersen	(Norway)	6	o	6:27.08	40	
8	Dmitry Babenko	(Kazakhstan)	1	i	6:27.45	36	
9	Frank Vreugdenhil	(Netherlands)	1	o	6:28.39	32	
10	Bart Swings	(Belgium)	5	o	6:29.76	28	
11	Danil Sinitsyn	(Russia)	2	o	6:31.50	24	
12	Moritz Geisreiter	(Germany)	3	i	6:43.09	21	
