= Jordan Belchos =

Canadian speed skater

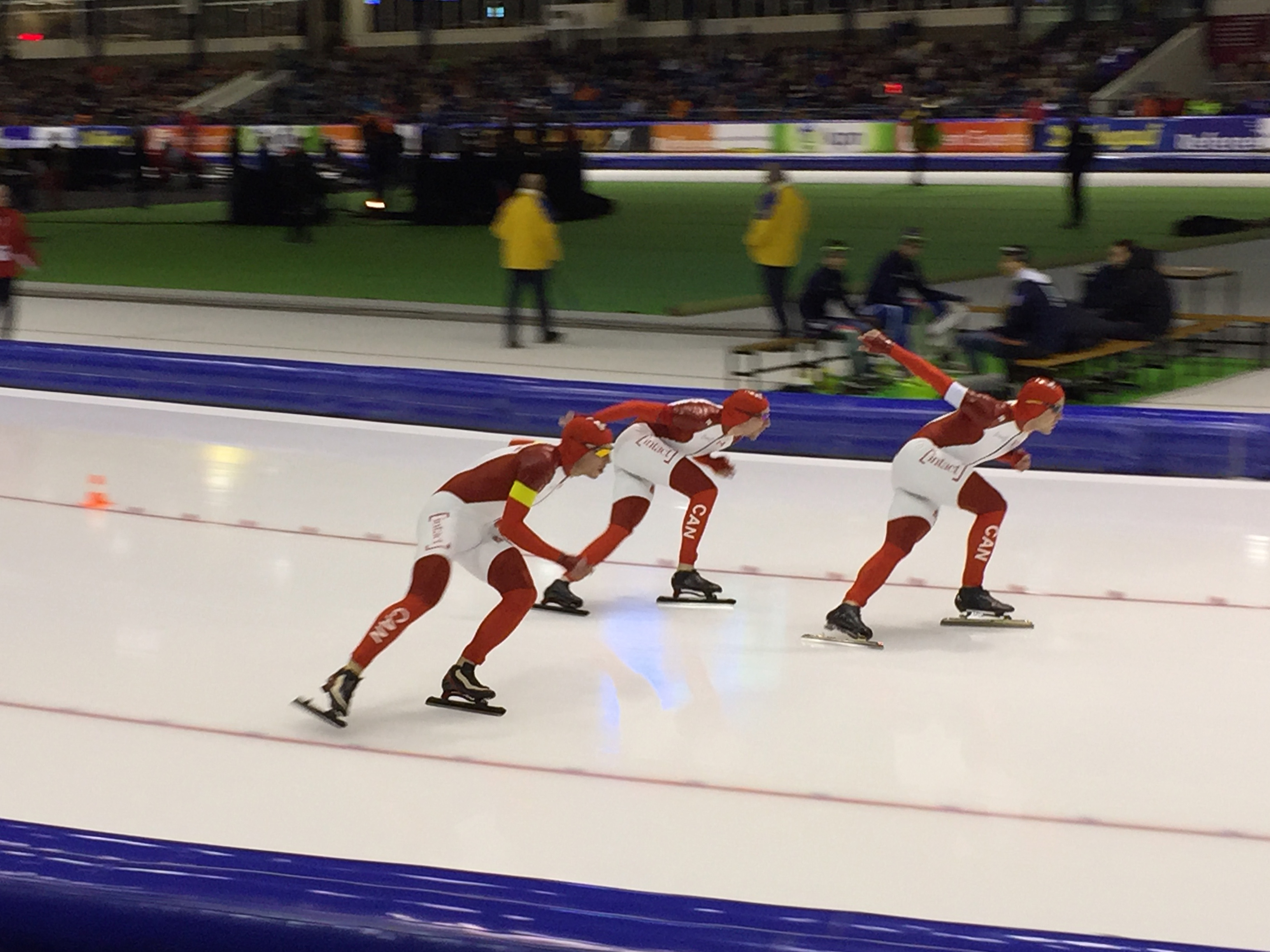

Personal information
- Born: June 22, 1989 (age 37) Toronto, Ontario, Canada
- Height: 1.84 m (6 ft 0 in)
- Weight: 81 kg (179 lb)

Sport
- Country: Canada
- Sport: Speed skating
- Event: Mass start
- Club: Markham Speed Skating Club
Medal record
Speed skating
World Single Distances Championships
Silver medal – second place	2015 Heerenveen	Team pursuit
Silver medal – second place	2020 Salt Lake City	Mass start
Silver medal – second place	2021 Heerenveen	Team pursuit
Bronze medal – third place	2016 Kolomna	Team pursuit
Four Continents Championships
Bronze medal – third place	2023 Quebec	5000 m
Inline speed skating
Pan American Games
Bronze medal – third place	2015 Toronto	10,000 m points race

Jordan Belchos (born June 22, 1989) is a Canadian speed skater. He primarily skates in the long distances of 1500 m, 5000 m and 10 000 m, as well as the mass start event. He won medals at the World Cup level and finished third at the 2012–13 ISU Speed Skating Mass Start World Cup.

== Career ==
=== 2015 Pan American Games ===
At the 2015 Pan American Games in Toronto, Canada, Belchos won a bronze medal in inline speed skating.

=== 2018 Winter Olympics ===
Belchos qualified to compete for Canada at the 2018 Winter Olympics.
