= Fredrik van der Horst =

Norwegian speed skater

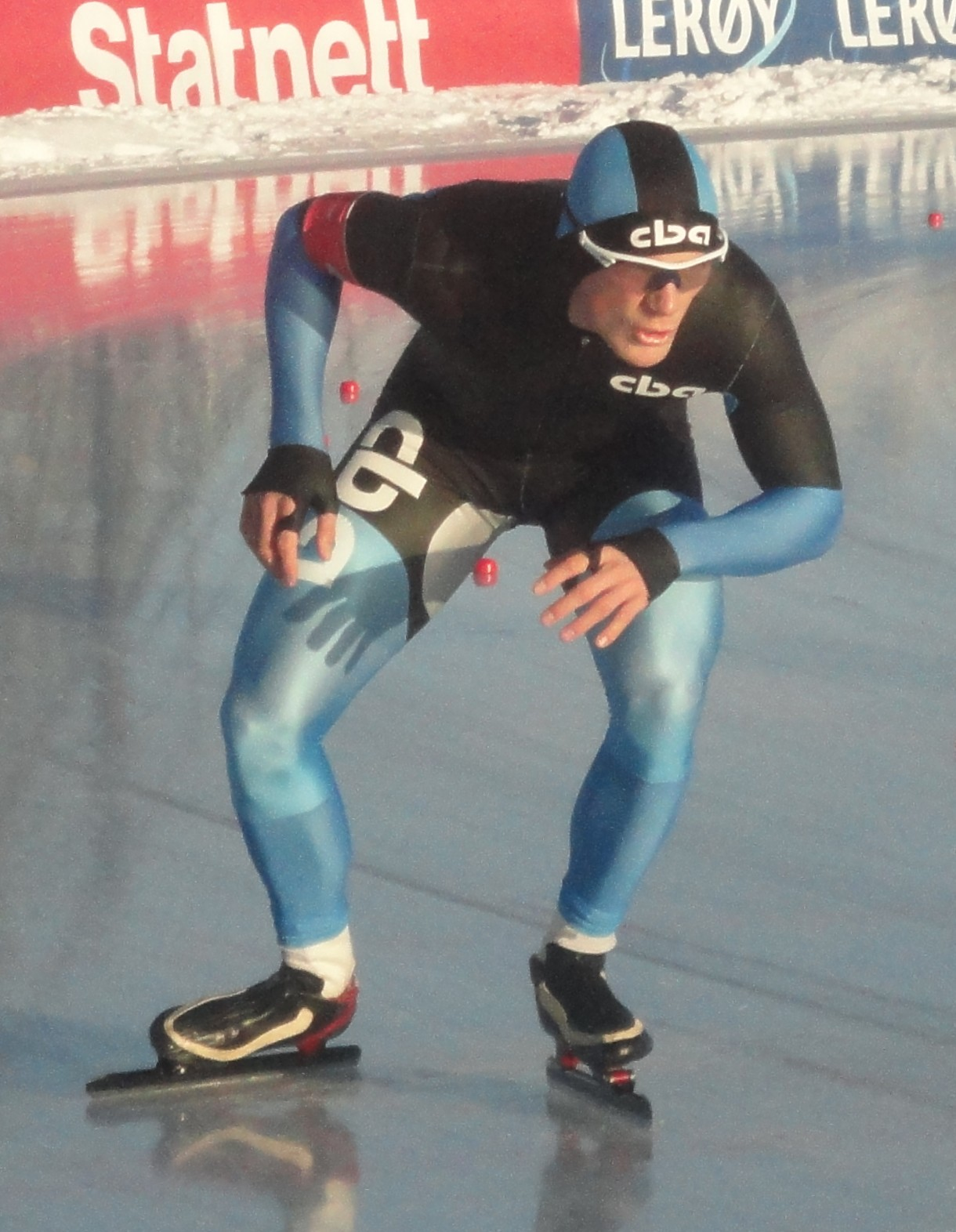
Fredrik van der Horst in 2012.

Fredrik van der Horst (Norwegian: [ˈfrɛ̀drɪk fɑn dər ˈhɔʂt]; born 2 December 1989) is a Norwegian speed-skater. He is the grandson of Hjalmar "Hjallis" Andersen.

He represented Norway at the 2010 Winter Olympics in Vancouver.
