= Maarten Swings =

Belgian speed skater

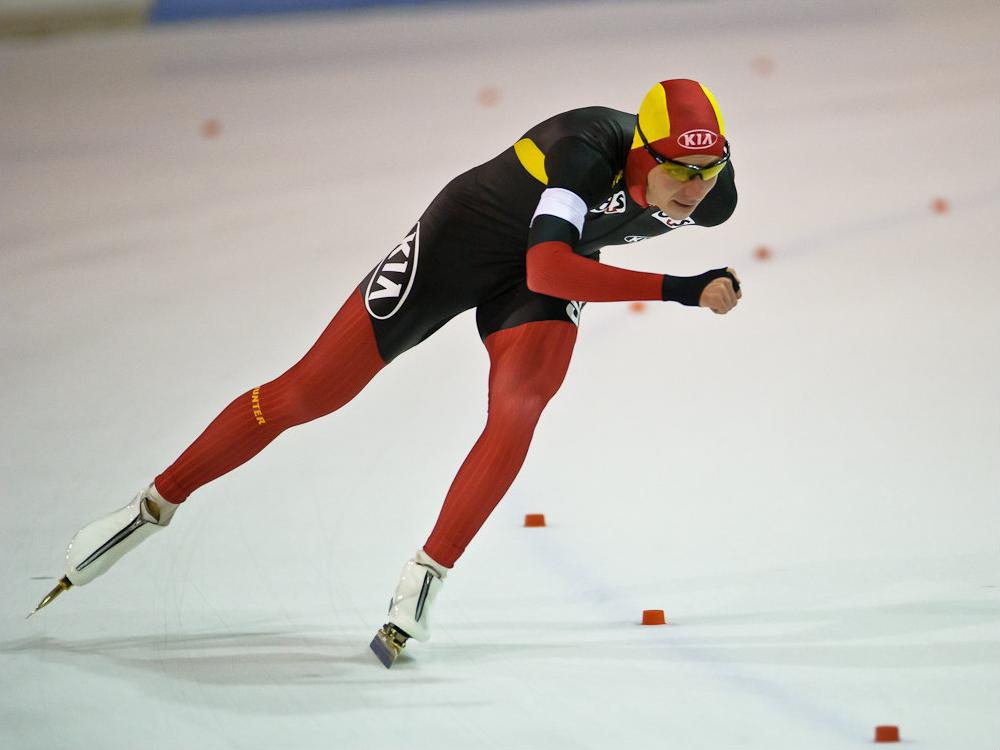
Maarten Swings in 2012

Maarten Swings (born 2 November 1988) is a Belgian speed skater (inline and ice) and multiple European and world champion.

Swings, his brother Bart Swings and Ferre Spruyt formed 'Team Stressless', the first Belgian professional top speed skating team.

Inline speedskating top results:

- 2011 European Champion men's speed inline skating (on the road) 5000 m relay race
- 2010 European Champion men's speed inline skating (on the road) 5000 m relay race
- 2009 European Champion men's speed inline skating (on the road) 3000 m relay race
