= Patrick Meek =

American speed skater (born 1985)

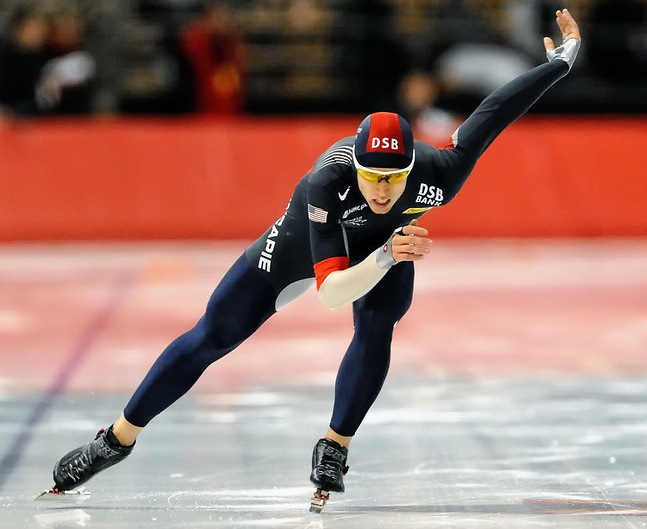
- Patrick Meek accelerates during a race at the 2009 Single Distance National Championships

Personal information
- Born: November 10, 1985 (age 40) Evanston, Illinois
- Education: University of Utah
- Spouse: Lauren Meek (m. 2022)
- Children: 2
- Website: www.patrickmeek.com

Sport
- Country: United States
- Sport: Speed skating

Patrick Meek (born November 10, 1985) is an American speed skater who represented the United States at the 2014 Winter Olympics. Meek began speed skating at age two, following in the footsteps of his father and grandfather. After high school, he moved to Utah to further his speed skating career. He made the national team in 2006 and participated in the 2006 and 2010 Olympic Trials without success.

Meek placed second in the 10,000 meters at the 2012–2013 National Championships. In 2013, he won two national titles taking the 25,000 and 50,000 meter events. In December, he placed third in the 5,000 meters at the Olympic Trials and thus qualified for his first Olympics. At the Olympics, Meek placed 20th in the 5,000 meters and 10th in the 10,000 meters after being added to the start list when other skaters withdrew.

== Early life and education ==
Patrick Meek was born November 10, 1985, in the Chicago suburb of Evanston, Illinois, into a family of avid speed skaters. His father was a speed skating coach and national team member, and his grandfather skated competitively at the club level. Meek's younger sister Kathleen also skated for a while, but gave up the sport as a kid. By age two, basically as soon as he could walk, Meek was on speed skates learning the sport. He grew up in the Chicago suburbs before moving to St. Louis, Missouri.

Meek graduated from the prestigious Jesuit St. Louis University High School in 2004 and moved to Utah to further his speed skating career. He earned a Bachelor of Science in Political Science from the University of Utah in 2009. As of 2014, he is working on a post-graduate degree at Ashworth College.

== Speed skating career ==
Meek made the national speed skating team in 2006. He elected to pursue distance events, realizing he did not have the proper physical characteristics for sprints and was well suited psychologically for long races. At the 2006 Olympic Trials, Meek had no aspirations of making the team but turned in a personal best in the 10,000 meters. 2010 was a different story – Meek expected to make the team and was devastated when his personal best time came up short. "At that moment, I [couldn't] get past the fact that I didn’t make the Olympic team", he later commented. "It was tough watching the event you’d committed your life to [on TV]."

At the 2012–2013 National Championships, Meek turned in a personal best time of 13:26.06 in the 10,000 meters en route to a second-place finish. In 2013, he won the United States title in the 25,000 and 50,000 meter races. At the Olympic Trials in December, in the 5,000 meter race Meek had both contact lenses come out with 1.5 laps to go. As a result, he "[couldn't] really see anything" but got through the race with the help of his coach yelling encouragements. He finished the race in 6:27.90, good enough for third place and a spot on the Olympic team. "It was kind of frightening", Meek recalled, but "when you hear [your coach yell 'This is for the Olympic team!'], you think, ‘Hey, I can do one more lap'". A few days later, Meek turned in a personal best time of 13:23.16 in the 10,000 meters, but came up 0.39 seconds short of the only qualifying spot in the event, placing third.

A the Olympics, Meek placed 20th in the 5000 meters with a time of 6:32.94. When several skaters from other nations withdrew from the 10,000 meters, Meek was selected from the alternate list to participate in the event. He finished the race in 13:28.72, placing 11th, five hundredths of a second behind Lehman. "Honestly I just started laughing," Meek said of the difference. "We were so close at trials and so close today."

Due to his difficult workouts, Meek has earned the nickname "Mule." He explains: "I don't always look pretty out there ... I am not the favorite barn animal. [But], more often than not, I get the job done out there." Meek does a lot of extreme distance training (100+ laps at a time) which he says helps him in the 5,000 meter (12.5 laps) and 10,000 meter (25 laps) races.

== Personal life ==
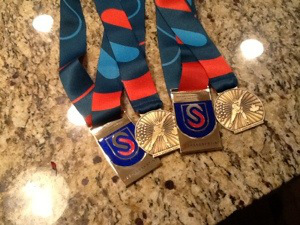
Meek won the 25000 meter and 50000 meter national championships in 2012

As part of a sponsorship deal, Meek works as a valet at the Waldorf Astoria Park City when not skating. In 2013, he teamed up with Charity: water to promote clean drinking water in the developing world. Meek also promotes Right To Play, a charity formed by former speed skater Johann Olav Koss. He has two sisters who live with his parents in Naples, Florida. In 2022 he married his wife, Lauren, and they have two children.

== Personal bests ==
Personal records
Men's speed skating
Event	Result	Date	Location	Notes
500 m	37.85	December 27, 2005	Utah Olympic Oval, Salt Lake City	
1000 m	1:13.36	March 8, 2008	Utah Olympic Oval, Salt Lake City	
1500 m	1:49.38	December 31, 2013	Utah Olympic Oval, Salt Lake City	
3000 m	3:46.53	December 20, 2013	Utah Olympic Oval, Salt Lake City	
5000 m	6:19.86	January 12, 2012	Utah Olympic Oval, Salt Lake City	
10000 m	13:23.16	January 1, 2014	Utah Olympic Oval, Salt Lake City	
