= 2014 European Speed Skating Championships =

International speed skating competition

- Venue: Vikingskipet, Hamar, Norway
- Dates: 11–12 January 2014
- Competitors: Men 31; Women 27

Medalist men
1st place, gold medalist(s)		Jan Blokhuijsen	NED
2nd place, silver medalist(s)		Koen Verweij	NED
3rd place, bronze medalist(s)		Håvard Bøkko	NOR

Medalist women
1st place, gold medalist(s)		Ireen Wüst	NED
2nd place, silver medalist(s)		Yvonne Nauta	NED
3rd place, bronze medalist(s)		Martina Sáblíková	CZE

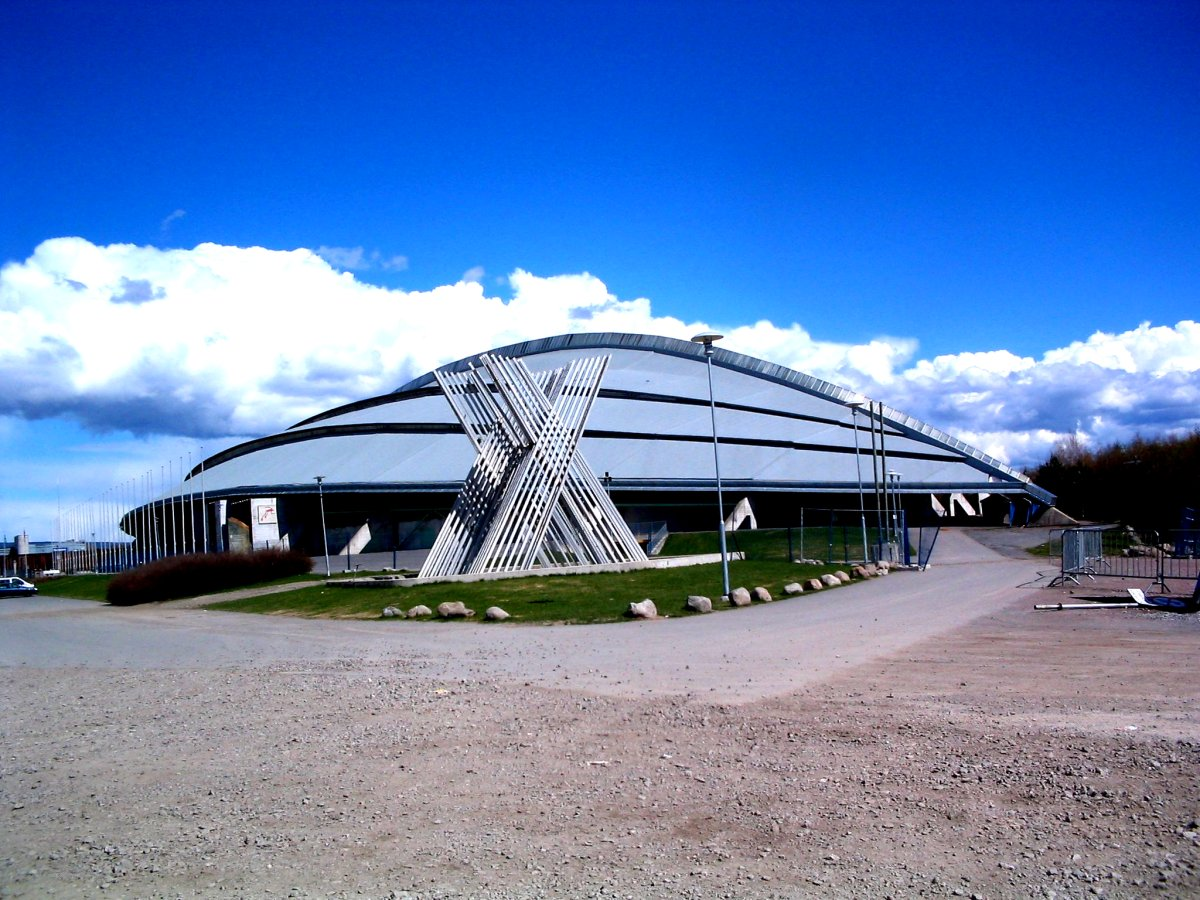
The Vikingskipet arena in Hamar

The 2014 European Speed Skating Championships, officially the Essent ISU European Speed Skating Championships 2014, were held in Hamar, Norway, from 11 to 12 January 2014.

== Schedule ==
The schedule of events:

Date	Events
Saturday, 11 January	12:50: 500 m women 13:21: 500 m men 14:16: 3000 m women 15:59: 5000 m men
Sunday, 12 January	13:00: 1500 m women 14:03: 1500 m men 15:04: 5000 m women 15:40: 10000 m men

All times are CET (UTC+1).

== Rules ==
All participating skaters are allowed to skate the first two distances. For the third distance, only the best 24 skaters are qualified. For the fourth distance, only the best 8 of the remaining skaters are qualified.

== Records ==
=== World records ===
World records going into the championships.

==== Men ====
Distance	Time	Holder	Nat.	Date	Venue	Reference
500 m	34.03	Jeremy Wotherspoon	(Canada)	9 November 2007	Utah Olympic Oval, Salt Lake City	
1500 m	1:41.04	Shani Davis	(United States)	11 December 2009	Utah Olympic Oval, Salt Lake City	
5000 m	6:03.32	Sven Kramer	(Netherlands)	17 November 2007	Olympic Oval, Calgary	
10000 m	12:41.69	Sven Kramer	(Netherlands)	10 March 2007	Utah Olympic Oval, Salt Lake City	

==== Women ====
Distance	Time	Holder	Nat.	Date	Venue	Reference
500 m	36.36	Lee Sang-hwa	(South Korea)	17 November 2013	Olympic Oval, Calgary	
1500 m	1:51.79	Cindy Klassen	(Canada)	20 November 2005	Utah Olympic Oval, Salt Lake City	
3000 m	3:53.34	Cindy Klassen	(Canada)	18 March 2006	Olympic Oval, Calgary	
5000 m	6:42.66	Martina Sáblíková	(Czech Republic)	18 February 2011	Utah Olympic Oval, Salt Lake City	

=== European records ===
European records going into the championships.

==== Men ====
Distance	Time	Holder	Nat.	Date	Venue	Reference
500 m	34.25	Ronald Mulder	(Netherlands)	17 November 2013	Utah Olympic Oval, Salt Lake City	
1500 m	1:42.28	Koen Verweij	(Netherlands)	15 November 2013	Utah Olympic Oval, Salt Lake City	
5000 m	6:03.32	Sven Kramer	(Netherlands)	17 November 2007	Olympic Oval, Calgary	
10000 m	12:41.69	Sven Kramer	(Netherlands)	10 March 2007	Utah Olympic Oval, Salt Lake City	

==== Women ====
Distance	Time	Holder	Nat.	Date	Venue	Reference
500 m	37.00	Jenny Wolf	(Germany)	11 December 2009	Utah Olympic Oval, Salt Lake City	
1500 m	1:52.08	Ireen Wüst	(Netherlands)	16 November 2013	Utah Olympic Oval, Salt Lake City	
3000 m	3:55.55	Martina Sáblíková	(Czech Republic)	12 February 2011	Olympic Oval, Calgary	
5000 m	6:42.66	Martina Sáblíková	(Czech Republic)	18 February 2011	Utah Olympic Oval, Salt Lake City	

== Men's championships ==
=== Day 1 ===
==== 500 metres ====
Rank	Skater	Nat.	Pair	Lane	Time	Notes	Points
1	Håvard Bøkko	(Norway)	16	o	35.99		35.990
2	Konrad Niedźwiedzki	(Poland)	15	o	36.06		36.060
3	Zbigniew Bródka	(Poland)	15	i	36.07		36.070
4	Koen Verweij	(Netherlands)	13	i	36.11		36.110
5	David Andersson	(Sweden)	5	o	36.33	NRJ	36.330
6	Jan Szymański	(Poland)	13	o	36.35		36.350
7	Jan Blokhuijsen	(Netherlands)	16	i	36.61		36.610
8	Renz Rotteveel	(Netherlands)	9	i	36.66		36.660
9	Sverre Lunde Pedersen	(Norway)	9	o	36.67		36.670
10	Piotr Puszkarski	(Poland)	14	i	36.68		36.680
11	Haralds Silovs	(Latvia)	14	o	36.79		36.790
12	Bart Swings	(Belgium)	12	i	36.80		36.800
13	Sergey Gryaztsov	(Russia)	11	i	36.81		36.810
14	Bram Smallenbroek	(Austria)	6	i	36.83		36.830
15	Andrea Giovannini	(Italy)	12	o	36.86		36.860
16	Luca Stefani	(Italy)	6	o	36.90		36.900
17	Vitaly Mikhailov	(Belarus)	11	o	36.94		36.940
18	Fredrik van der Horst	(Norway)	10	o	37.07		37.070
19	Aleksey Suvorov	(Russia)	2	o	37.15		37.150
20	Douwe de Vries	(Netherlands)	3	i	37.29		37.290
21	Konrád Nagy	(Hungary)	5	i	37.46		37.460
22	Robert Lehmann	(Germany)	8	o	37.69		37.690
23	Ewen Fernandez	(France)	8	i	37.71		37.710
24	Linus Heidegger	(Austria)	10	i	37.75		37.750
25	Yevgeny Seryaev	(Russia)	4	i	37.84		37.840
26	Livio Wenger	(Switzerland)	4	o	38.24		38.240
27	Jonas Pflug	(Germany)	3	o	38.36		38.360
28	Nils van der Poel	(Sweden)	2	i	38.51		38.510
29	Zdeněk Haselberger	(Czech Republic)	7	i	38.59		38.590
30	Wannes van Praet	(Belgium)	7	o	38.65		38.650
31	Stefan Due Schmidt	(Denmark)	1	i	38.69		38.690

Note: NRJ = national record for juniors.

==== 5000 metres ====
Rank	Skater	Nat.	Pair	Lane	Time	Notes	Points
1	Jan Blokhuijsen	(Netherlands)	14	i	6:15.89		37.589
2	Douwe de Vries	(Netherlands)	16	i	6:19.47		37.947
3	Bart Swings	(Belgium)	16	o	6:20.92		38.092
4	Koen Verweij	(Netherlands)	15	i	6:21.59		38.159
5	Sverre Lunde Pedersen	(Norway)	13	o	6:21.81		38.181
6	Renz Rotteveel	(Netherlands)	10	o	6:22.82		38.282
7	Håvard Bøkko	(Norway)	15	o	6:22.97		38.297
8	Jan Szymański	(Poland)	10	i	6:26.38		38.638
9	Yevgeny Seryaev	(Russia)	14	o	6:29.49		38.949
10	Fredrik van der Horst	(Norway)	6	o	6:29.88		38.988
11	Sergey Gryaztsov	(Russia)	7	o	6:31.01		39.101
12	Konrad Niedźwiedzki	(Poland)	11	i	6:32.62		39.262
13	Robert Lehmann	(Germany)	11	o	6:33.26		39.326
14	Andrea Giovannini	(Italy)	12	i	6:33.87		39.387
15	Zbigniew Bródka	(Poland)	8	o	6:34.18		39.418
16	Luca Stefani	(Italy)	6	i	6:34.32		39.432
17	Haralds Silovs	(Latvia)	9	i	6:36.59		39.659
18	Nils van der Poel	(Sweden)	9	o	6:38.09		39.809
19	Ewen Fernandez	(France)	13	i	6:38.76		39.876
20	Aleksey Suvorov	(Russia)	4	o	6:40.63		40.063
21	Konrád Nagy	(Hungary)	3	i	6:42.06	NR	40.206
22	Piotr Puszkarski	(Poland)	3	o	6:42.79		40.279
23	David Andersson	(Sweden)	2	i	6:44.92		40.492
24	Bram Smallenbroek	(Austria)	5	i	6:45.04		40.504
25	Jonas Pflug	(Germany)	12	o	6:45.82		40.582
26	Linus Heidegger	(Austria)	8	i	6:45.90		40.590
27	Livio Wenger	(Switzerland)	2	o	6:46.14		40.614
28	Vitaly Mikhailov	(Belarus)	5	o	6:50.79		41.079
29	Stefan Due Schmidt	(Denmark)	4	i	6:51.89		41.189
30	Wannes van Praet	(Belgium)	7	i	7:02.24		42.224
31	Zdeněk Haselberger	(Czech Republic)	1	i	7:02.70		42.270

Note: NR = national record.

==== Ranking after two events ====
Rank	Skater	Nat.	500 m	5000 m	Points
1	Jan Blokhuijsen	(Netherlands)	36.61 (7)	6:15.89 (1)	74.199
2	Koen Verweij	(Netherlands)	36.11 (4)	6:21.59 (4)	74.269
3	Håvard Bøkko	(Norway)	35.99 (1)	6:22.97 (7)	74.287
4	Sverre Lunde Pedersen	(Norway)	36.67 (9)	6:21.81 (5)	74.851
5	Bart Swings	(Belgium)	36.80 (12)	6:20.92 (3)	74.892
6	Renz Rotteveel	(Netherlands)	36.66 (8)	6:22.82 (6)	74.942
7	Jan Szymański	(Poland)	36.35 (6)	6:26.38 (8)	74.988
8	Douwe de Vries	(Netherlands)	37.29 (20)	6:19.47 (2)	75.237
9	Konrad Niedźwiedzki	(Poland)	36.06 (2)	6:32.62 (12)	75.322
10	Zbigniew Bródka	(Poland)	36.07 (3)	6:34.18 (15)	75.488
11	Sergey Gryaztsov	(Russia)	36.81 (13)	6:31.01 (11)	75.911
12	Fredrik van der Horst	(Norway)	37.07 (18)	6:29.88 (10)	76.058
13	Andrea Giovannini	(Italy)	36.86 (15)	6:33.87 (14)	76.247
14	Luca Stefani	(Italy)	36.90 (16)	6:34.32 (16)	76.332
15	Haralds Silovs	(Latvia)	36.79 (11)	6:36.59 (17)	76.449
16	Yevgeny Seryaev	(Russia)	37.84 (25)	6:29.49 (9)	76.789
17	David Andersson	(Sweden)	36.33 (5)	6:44.92 (23)	76.822
18	Piotr Puszkarski	(Poland)	36.68 (10)	6:42.79 (22)	76.959
19	Robert Lehmann	(Germany)	37.69 (22)	6:33.26 (13)	77.016
20	Aleksey Suvorov	(Russia)	37.15 (19)	6:40.63 (20)	77.213
21	Bram Smallenbroek	(Austria)	36.83 (14)	6:45.04 (24)	77.334
22	Ewen Fernandez	(France)	37.71 (23)	6:38.76 (19)	77.586
23	Konrád Nagy	(Hungary)	37.46 (21)	6:42.06 (21)	77.666
NQ24	Vitaly Mikhailov	(Belarus)	36.94 (17)	6:50.79 (28)	78.019
25	Nils van der Poel	(Sweden)	38.51 (28)	6:38.09 (18)	78.319
NQ26	Linus Heidegger	(Austria)	37.75 (24)	6:45.90 (26)	78.340
NQ27	Livio Wenger	(Switzerland)	38.24 (26)	6:46.14 (27)	78.854
NQ28	Jonas Pflug	(Germany)	38.36 (27)	6:45.82 (25)	78.942
NQ29	Stefan Due Schmidt	(Denmark)	38.69 (31)	6:51.89 (29)	79.879
NQ30	Zdeněk Haselberger	(Czech Republic)	38.59 (29)	7:02.70 (31)	80.860
NQ31	Wannes van Praet	(Belgium)	38.65 (30)	7:02.24 (30)	80.874

Note: NQ = not qualified.

=== Day 2 ===
==== 1500 metres ====
Rank	Skater	Nat.	Pair	Lane	Time	Notes	Points
1	Koen Verweij	(Netherlands)	12	o	1:45.93		35.310
2	Konrad Niedźwiedzki	(Poland)	8	i	1:46.16		35.386
3	Zbigniew Bródka	(Poland)	8	o	1:46.19		35.396
4	Sverre Lunde Pedersen	(Norway)	11	o	1:46.28		35.426
5	Jan Szymański	(Poland)	9	i	1:46.39		35.463
6	Håvard Bøkko	(Norway)	11	i	1:46.51		35.503
7	Bart Swings	(Belgium)	10	i	1:46.53		35.510
8	Renz Rotteveel	(Netherlands)	10	o	1:46.69		35.563
9	Jan Blokhuijsen	(Netherlands)	12	i	1:46.91		35.636
10	Douwe de Vries	(Netherlands)	9	o	1:47.38		35.793
11	Sergey Gryaztsov	(Russia)	7	i	1:47.90		35.966
12	Aleksey Suvorov	(Russia)	3	o	1:48.39		36.130
13	Haralds Silovs	(Latvia)	5	i	1:48.66		36.220
14	Konrád Nagy	(Hungary)	1	i	1:49.59		36.530
15	Fredrik van der Horst	(Norway)	7	o	1:49.61		36.536
15	Bram Smallenbroek	(Austria)	2	i	1:49.61		36.536
17	David Andersson	(Sweden)	4	i	1:49.64		36.546
18	Piotr Puszkarski	(Poland)	4	o	1:50.10		36.700
19	Andrea Giovannini	(Italy)	6	i	1:50.48		36.826
20	Yevgeny Seryaev	(Russia)	5	o	1:50.62		36.873
21	Luca Stefani	(Italy)	6	o	1:50.63		36.876
22	Robert Lehmann	(Germany)	3	i	1:51.00		37.000
23	Ewen Fernandez	(France)	2	o	1:52.46		37.486
24	Nils van der Poel	(Sweden)	1	o	1:53.47		37.823

==== Ranking after three events ====
Rank	Skater	Nat.	500 m	5000 m	1500 m	Points
1	Koen Verweij	(Netherlands)	36.11 (4)	6:21.59 (4)	1:45.93 (1)	109.579
2	Håvard Bøkko	(Norway)	35.99 (1)	6:22.97 (7)	1:46.51 (6)	109.790
3	Jan Blokhuijsen	(Netherlands)	36.61 (7)	6:15.89 (1)	1:46.91 (9)	109.835
4	Sverre Lunde Pedersen	(Norway)	36.67 (9)	6:21.81 (5)	1:46.28 (4)	110.277
5	Bart Swings	(Belgium)	36.80 (12)	6:20.92 (3)	1:46.53 (7)	110.402
6	Jan Szymański	(Poland)	36.35 (6)	6:26.38 (8)	1:46.39 (5)	110.451
7	Renz Rotteveel	(Netherlands)	36.66 (8)	6:22.82 (6)	1:46.69 (8)	110.505
NQ8	Konrad Niedźwiedzki	(Poland)	36.06 (2)	6:32.62 (12)	1:46.16 (2)	110.708
NQ9	Zbigniew Bródka	(Poland)	36.07 (3)	6:34.18 (15)	1:46.19 (3)	110.884
10	Douwe de Vries	(Netherlands)	37.29 (20)	6:19.47 (2)	1:47.38 (10)	111.030
NQ11	Sergey Gryaztsov	(Russia)	36.81 (13)	6:31.01 (11)	1:47.90 (11)	111.877
NQ12	Fredrik van der Horst	(Norway)	37.07 (18)	6:29.88 (10)	1:49.61 (15)	112.594
NQ13	Haralds Silovs	(Latvia)	36.79 (11)	6:36.59 (17)	1:48.66 (13)	112.669
NQ14	Andrea Giovannini	(Italy)	36.86 (15)	6:33.87 (14)	1:50.48 (19)	113.073
NQ15	Luca Stefani	(Italy)	36.90 (16)	6:34.32 (16)	1:50.63 (21)	113.208
NQ16	Aleksey Suvorov	(Russia)	37.15 (19)	6:40.63 (20)	1:48.39 (12)	113.343
NQ17	David Andersson	(Sweden)	36.33 (5)	6:44.92 (23)	1:49.64 (17)	113.368
NQ18	Piotr Puszkarski	(Poland)	36.68 (10)	6:42.79 (22)	1:50.10 (18)	113.659
NQ19	Yevgeny Seryaev	(Russia)	37.84 (25)	6:29.49 (9)	1:50.62 (20)	113.662
NQ20	Bram Smallenbroek	(Austria)	36.83 (14)	6:45.04 (24)	1:49.61 (15)	113.870
NQ21	Robert Lehmann	(Germany)	37.69 (22)	6:33.26 (13)	1:51.00 (22)	114.016
NQ22	Konrád Nagy	(Hungary)	37.46 (21)	6:42.06 (21)	1:49.59 (14)	114.196
NQ23	Ewen Fernandez	(France)	37.71 (23)	6:38.76 (19)	1:52.46 (23)	115.072
NQ24	Nils van der Poel	(Sweden)	38.51 (28)	6:38.09 (18)	1:53.47 (24)	116.142

Note: NQ = not qualified.

==== 10000 metres ====
Rank	Skater	Nat.	Pair	Lane	Time	Notes	Points
1	Jan Blokhuijsen	(Netherlands)	4	i	13:07.22		39.361
2	Koen Verweij	(Netherlands)	4	o	13:13.45		39.672
3	Bart Swings	(Belgium)	2	o	13:17.41		39.870
4	Sverre Lunde Pedersen	(Norway)	3	i	13:20.50		40.025
5	Håvard Bøkko	(Norway)	3	o	13:22.09		40.104
6	Renz Rotteveel	(Netherlands)	1	i	13:26.75		40.337
7	Douwe de Vries	(Netherlands)	2	i	13:28.99		40.449
8	Jan Szymański	(Poland)	1	o	13:53.34		41.667

=== Final ranking ===
Rank	Skater	Nat.	500 m	5000 m	1500 m	10000 m	Points
1st place, gold medalist(s)	Jan Blokhuijsen	(Netherlands)	36.61 (7)	6:15.89 (1)	1:46.91 (9)	13:07.22 (1)	149.196
2nd place, silver medalist(s)	Koen Verweij	(Netherlands)	36.11 (4)	6:21.59 (4)	1:45.93 (1)	13:13.45 (2)	149.251
3rd place, bronze medalist(s)	Håvard Bøkko	(Norway)	35.99 (1)	6:22.97 (7)	1:46.51 (6)	13:22.09 (5)	149.894
4	Bart Swings	(Belgium)	36.80 (12)	6:20.92 (3)	1:46.53 (7)	13:17.41 (3)	150.272
5	Sverre Lunde Pedersen	(Norway)	36.67 (9)	6:21.81 (5)	1:46.28 (4)	13:20.50 (4)	150.302
6	Renz Rotteveel	(Netherlands)	36.66 (8)	6:22.82 (6)	1:46.69 (8)	13:26.75 (6)	150.842
7	Douwe de Vries	(Netherlands)	37.29 (20)	6:19.47 (2)	1:47.38 (10)	13:28.99 (7)	151.479
8	Jan Szymański	(Poland)	36.35 (6)	6:26.38 (8)	1:46.39 (5)	13:53.34 (8)	152.118

== Women's championships ==
=== Day 1 ===
==== 500 metres ====
Rank	Skater	Nat.	Pair	Lane	Time	Notes	Points
1	Ireen Wüst	(Netherlands)	14	i	38.77		38.770
2	Karolína Erbanová	(Czech Republic)	12	o	38.80		38.800
3	Yuliya Skokova	(Russia)	14	o	39.01		39.010
4	Yekaterina Shikhova	(Russia)	11	o	39.14		39.140
5	Katarzyna Bachleda-Curuś	(Poland)	7	o	39.59		39.590
5	Yevgeniya Dmitriyeva	(Russia)	8	o	39.59		39.590
7	Diane Valkenburg	(Netherlands)	7	i	39.79		39.790
8	Olga Graf	(Russia)	9	i	40.05		40.050
9	Marije Joling	(Netherlands)	11	i	40.09		40.090
10	Ida Njåtun	(Norway)	13	o	40.19		40.190
11	Francesca Bettrone	(Italy)	13	i	40.24		40.240
12	Natalia Czerwonka	(Poland)	9	o	40.28		40.280
13	Luiza Złotkowska	(Poland)	8	i	40.32		40.320
14	Claudia Pechstein	(Germany)	4	o	40.40		40.400
15	Kaitlyn McGregor	(Switzerland)	12	i	40.43		40.430
16	Yvonne Nauta	(Netherlands)	2	i	40.79		40.790
17	Sofie Haugen	(Norway)	5	i	40.80		40.800
18	Jelena Peeters	(Belgium)	6	o	40.82	NR	40.820
19	Martina Sáblíková	(Czech Republic)	10	o	40.89		40.890
20	Johanna Östlund	(Sweden)	3	o	40.99		40.990
21	Tatyana Mikhailova	(Belarus)	10	i	41.05		41.050
22	Jennifer Bay	(Germany)	3	i	41.26		41.260
23	Daniela Oltean	(Romania)	6	i	41.44		41.440
24	Nikola Zdráhalová	(Czech Republic)	4	i	41.86		41.860
25	Camilla Hallås-Farestveit	(Norway)	2	o	42.15		42.150
26	Saskia Alusalu	(Estonia)	5	o	43.02		43.020
27	Sara Bak-Briand	(Denmark)	1	i	46.45		46.450

Note: NR = national record.

==== 3000 metres ====
Rank	Skater	Nat.	Pair	Lane	Time	Notes	Points
1	Ireen Wüst	(Netherlands)	11	o	4:02.02		40.336
2	Yvonne Nauta	(Netherlands)	10	i	4:02.63		40.438
3	Martina Sáblíková	(Czech Republic)	13	o	4:04.22		40.703
4	Marije Joling	(Netherlands)	7	o	4:04.24		40.706
5	Claudia Pechstein	(Germany)	12	i	4:06.53		41.088
6	Diane Valkenburg	(Netherlands)	9	o	4:06.82		41.136
7	Yuliya Skokova	(Russia)	6	i	4:08.28		41.380
8	Olga Graf	(Russia)	8	o	4:08.31		41.385
9	Katarzyna Bachleda-Curuś	(Poland)	12	o	4:09.80		41.633
10	Yekaterina Shikhova	(Russia)	6	o	4:10.15		41.691
11	Yevgeniya Dmitriyeva	(Russia)	5	i	4:10.56		41.760
12	Jelena Peeters	(Belgium)	11	i	4:10.76		41.793
13	Natalia Czerwonka	(Poland)	9	i	4:13.42		42.236
14	Luiza Złotkowska	(Poland)	13	i	4:13.46		42.243
15	Ida Njåtun	(Norway)	10	o	4:14.26		42.376
16	Camilla Hallås-Farestveit	(Norway)	8	i	4:15.04		42.506
17	Jennifer Bay	(Germany)	7	i	4:15.54		42.590
18	Kaitlyn McGregor	(Switzerland)	3	i	4:19.88		43.313
19	Saskia Alusalu	(Estonia)	3	o	4:22.53		43.755
20	Daniela Oltean	(Romania)	5	o	4:22.99		43.831
21	Karolína Erbanová	(Czech Republic)	2	o	4:25.61		44.268
22	Sofie Haugen	(Norway)	1	o	4:26.16		44.360
23	Francesca Bettrone	(Italy)	1	i	4:27.12		44.520
24	Tatyana Mikhailova	(Belarus)	4	o	4:27.57		44.595
25	Nikola Zdráhalová	(Czech Republic)	4	i	4:33.66		45.610
26	Johanna Östlund	(Sweden)	2	i	DQ		–

==== Ranking after two events ====
Rank	Skater	Nat.	500 m	3000 m	Points
1	Ireen Wüst	(Netherlands)	38.77 (1)	4:02.02 (1)	79.106
2	Yuliya Skokova	(Russia)	39.01 (3)	4:08.28 (7)	80.390
3	Marije Joling	(Netherlands)	40.09 (9)	4:04.24 (4)	80.796
4	Yekaterina Shikhova	(Russia)	39.14 (4)	4:10.15 (10)	80.831
5	Diane Valkenburg	(Netherlands)	39.79 (7)	4:06.82 (6)	80.926
6	Katarzyna Bachleda-Curuś	(Poland)	39.59 (5)	4:09.80 (9)	81.223
7	Yvonne Nauta	(Netherlands)	40.79 (16)	4:02.63 (2)	81.228
8	Yevgeniya Dmitriyeva	(Russia)	39.59 (5)	4:10.56 (11)	81.350
9	Olga Graf	(Russia)	40.05 (8)	4:08.31 (8)	81.435
10	Claudia Pechstein	(Germany)	40.40 (14)	4:06.53 (5)	81.488
11	Martina Sáblíková	(Czech Republic)	40.89 (19)	4:04.22 (3)	81.593
12	Natalia Czerwonka	(Poland)	40.28 (12)	4:13.42 (13)	82.516
13	Luiza Złotkowska	(Poland)	40.32 (13)	4:13.46 (14)	82.563
14	Ida Njåtun	(Norway)	40.19 (10)	4:14.26 (15)	82.566
15	Jelena Peeters	(Belgium)	40.82 (18)	4:10.76 (12)	82.613
16	Karolína Erbanová	(Czech Republic)	38.80 (2)	4:25.61 (21)	83.068
17	Kaitlyn McGregor	(Switzerland)	40.43 (15)	4:19.88 (18)	83.743
18	Jennifer Bay	(Germany)	41.26 (22)	4:15.54 (17)	83.850
19	Camilla Hallås-Farestveit	(Norway)	42.15 (25)	4:15.04 (16)	84.656
20	Francesca Bettrone	(Italy)	40.24 (11)	4:27.12 (23)	84.760
21	Sofie Haugen	(Norway)	40.80 (17)	4:26.16 (22)	85.160
22	Daniela Oltean	(Romania)	41.44 (23)	4:22.99 (20)	85.271
23	Tatyana Mikhailova	(Belarus)	41.05 (21)	4:27.57 (24)	85.645
24	Saskia Alusalu	(Estonia)	43.02 (26)	4:22.53 (19)	86.775
NQ25	Nikola Zdráhalová	(Czech Republic)	41.86 (24)	4:33.66 (25)	87.470
NQ26	Johanna Östlund	(Sweden)	40.99 (20)	DQ (26)	–
NQ27	Sara Bak-Briand	(Denmark)	46.45 (27)		46.450

Note: NQ = not qualified.

=== Day 2 ===
==== 1500 metres ====
Rank	Skater	Nat.	Pair	Lane	Time	Notes	Points
1	Ireen Wüst	(Netherlands)	12	i	1:54.87		38.290
2	Yuliya Skokova	(Russia)	12	o	1:57.02		39.006
3	Yvonne Nauta	(Netherlands)	9	i	1:57.28		39.093
4	Olga Graf	(Russia)	8	i	1:57.40		39.133
5	Martina Sáblíková	(Czech Republic)	7	i	1:57.46		39.153
6	Yekaterina Shikhova	(Russia)	11	o	1:57.47		39.156
7	Diane Valkenburg	(Netherlands)	10	i	1:57.76		39.253
8	Luiza Złotkowska	(Poland)	6	i	1:58.00		39.333
9	Yevgeniya Dmitriyeva	(Russia)	9	o	1:58.67		39.556
10	Ida Njåtun	(Norway)	6	o	1:58.89		39.630
11	Marije Joling	(Netherlands)	11	i	1:58.92		39.640
12	Natalia Czerwonka	(Poland)	7	o	1:58.95		39.650
13	Katarzyna Bachleda-Curuś	(Poland)	10	o	1:59.00		39.666
14	Jelena Peeters	(Belgium)	5	i	1:59.12		39.706
15	Claudia Pechstein	(Germany)	8	o	1:59.49		39.830
16	Karolína Erbanová	(Czech Republic)	5	o	2:00.08		40.026
17	Kaitlyn McGregor	(Switzerland)	4	i	2:00.28		40.093
18	Camilla Hallås-Farestveit	(Norway)	3	i	2:02.95		40.983
19	Francesca Bettrone	(Italy)	3	o	2:03.28		41.093
20	Jennifer Bay	(Germany)	4	o	2:03.37		41.123
21	Sofie Haugen	(Norway)	2	i	2:03.64		41.213
22	Daniela Oltean	(Romania)	2	o	2:03.99		41.330
23	Tatyana Mikhailova	(Belarus)	1	i	2:04.41		41.470
24	Saskia Alusalu	(Estonia)	1	o	2:07.72		42.573

==== Ranking after three events ====
Rank	Skater	Nat.	500 m	5000 m	1500 m	Points
1	Ireen Wüst	(Netherlands)	38.77 (1)	4:02.02 (1)	1:54.87 (1)	117.396
2	Yuliya Skokova	(Russia)	39.01 (3)	4:08.28 (7)	1:54.87 (2)	119.396
WD3	Yekaterina Shikhova	(Russia)	39.14 (4)	4:10.15 (10)	1:57.47 (6)	119.987
4	Diane Valkenburg	(Netherlands)	39.79 (7)	4:06.82 (6)	1:57.76 (7)	120.179
5	Yvonne Nauta	(Netherlands)	40.79 (16)	4:02.63 (2)	1:57.28 (3)	120.321
6	Marije Joling	(Netherlands)	40.09 (9)	4:04.24 (4)	1:58.92 (11)	120.436
7	Olga Graf	(Russia)	40.05 (8)	4:08.31 (8)	1:57.40 (4)	120.568
8	Martina Sáblíková	(Czech Republic)	40.89 (19)	4:04.22 (3)	1:57.46 (5)	120.746
NQ9	Katarzyna Bachleda-Curuś	(Poland)	39.59 (5)	4:09.80 (9)	1:59.00 (13)	120.889
NQ10	Yevgeniya Dmitriyeva	(Russia)	39.59 (5)	4:10.56 (11)	1:58.67 (9)	120.906
11	Claudia Pechstein	(Germany)	40.40 (14)	4:06.53 (5)	1:59.49 (15)	121.318
NQ12	Luiza Złotkowska	(Poland)	40.32 (13)	4:13.46 (14)	1:58.00 (8)	121.896
NQ13	Natalia Czerwonka	(Poland)	40.28 (12)	4:13.42 (13)	1:58.95 (12)	122.166
NQ14	Ida Njåtun	(Norway)	40.19 (10)	4:14.26 (15)	1:58.89 (10)	122.196
NQ15	Jelena Peeters	(Belgium)	40.82 (18)	4:10.76 (12)	1:59.12 (14)	122.319
NQ16	Karolína Erbanová	(Czech Republic)	38.80 (2)	4:25.61 (21)	2:00.08 (16)	123.094
NQ17	Kaitlyn McGregor	(Switzerland)	40.43 (15)	4:19.88 (18)	2:00.28 (17)	123.836
NQ18	Jennifer Bay	(Germany)	41.26 (22)	4:15.54 (17)	2:03.37 (20)	124.973
NQ19	Camilla Hallås-Farestveit	(Norway)	42.15 (25)	4:15.04 (16)	2:02.95 (18)	125.639
NQ20	Francesca Bettrone	(Italy)	40.24 (11)	4:27.12 (23)	2:03.28 (19)	125.853
NQ21	Sofie Haugen	(Norway)	40.80 (17)	4:26.16 (22)	2:03.64 (21)	126.373
NQ22	Daniela Oltean	(Romania)	41.44 (23)	4:22.99 (20)	2:03.99 (22)	126.601
NQ23	Tatyana Mikhailova	(Belarus)	41.05 (21)	4:27.57 (24)	2:04.41 (23)	127.115
NQ24	Saskia Alusalu	(Estonia)	43.02 (26)	4:22.53 (19)	2:07.72 (24)	129.348

Note: WD = withdrew after the distance, NQ = not qualified.

==== 5000 metres ====
Rank	Skater	Nat.	Pair	Lane	Time	Notes	Points
1	Martina Sáblíková	(Czech Republic)	2	i	6:58.13		41.813
2	Yvonne Nauta	(Netherlands)	4	o	6:59.32		41.932
3	Ireen Wüst	(Netherlands)	4	i	7:03.40		42.340
4	Claudia Pechstein	(Germany)	1	i	7:05.44		42.544
5	Diane Valkenburg	(Netherlands)	3	i	7:09.41		42.941
6	Olga Graf	(Russia)	1	o	7:12.57		43.257
7	Marije Joling	(Netherlands)	2	o	7:17.43		43.743
8	Yuliya Skokova	(Russia)	3	o	7:22.09		44.209

=== Allround results ===
Rank	Skater	Nat.	500 m	3000 m	1500 m	5000 m	Points
1st place, gold medalist(s)	Ireen Wüst	(Netherlands)	38.77 (1)	4:02.02 (1)	1:54.87 (1)	7:03.40 (3)	159.736
2nd place, silver medalist(s)	Yvonne Nauta	(Netherlands)	40.79 (16)	4:02.63 (2)	1:57.28 (3)	6:59.32 (2)	162.253
3rd place, bronze medalist(s)	Martina Sáblíková	(Czech Republic)	40.89 (19)	4:04.22 (3)	1:57.46 (5)	6:58.13 (1)	162.559
4	Diane Valkenburg	(Netherlands)	39.79 (7)	4:06.82 (6)	1:57.76 (7)	7:09.41 (5)	163.120
5	Yuliya Skokova	(Russia)	39.01 (3)	4:08.28 (7)	1:57.02 (2)	7:22.09 (8)	163.605
6	Olga Graf	(Russia)	40.05 (8)	4:08.31 (8)	1:57.40 (4)	7:12.57 (6)	163.825
7	Claudia Pechstein	(Germany)	40.40 (14)	4:06.53 (5)	1:59.49 (15)	7:05.44 (4)	163.862
8	Marije Joling	(Netherlands)	40.09 (9)	4:04.24 (4)	1:58.92 (11)	7:17.43 (7)	164.179
9	Yekaterina Shikhova	(Russia)	39.14 (4)	4:10.15 (10)	1:57.47 (6)		119.987
10	Katarzyna Bachleda-Curuś	(Poland)	39.59 (5)	4:09.80 (9)	1:59.00 (13)		120.889
11	Yevgeniya Dmitriyeva	(Russia)	39.59 (5)	4:10.56 (11)	1:58.67 (9)		120.906
12	Luiza Złotkowska	(Poland)	40.32 (13)	4:13.46 (14)	1:58.00 (8)		121.896
13	Natalia Czerwonka	(Poland)	40.28 (12)	4:13.42 (13)	1:58.95 (12)		122.166
14	Ida Njåtun	(Norway)	40.19 (10)	4:14.26 (15)	1:58.89 (10)		122.196
15	Jelena Peeters	(Belgium)	40.82 (18)	4:10.76 (12)	1:59.12 (14)		122.319
16	Karolína Erbanová	(Czech Republic)	38.80 (2)	4:25.61 (21)	2:00.08 (16)		123.094

== See also ==
- 2014 World Allround Speed Skating Championships
