= 2015 European Speed Skating Championships =

International speed skating competition

- Venue: Uralskaya Molniya, Chelyabinsk, Russia
- Dates: 10–11 January 2015
- Competitors: Men 22; Women 19

Medalist men
1st place, gold medalist(s)		Sven Kramer	NED
2nd place, silver medalist(s)		Koen Verweij	NED
3rd place, bronze medalist(s)		Denis Yuskov	RUS

Medalist women
1st place, gold medalist(s)		Ireen Wüst	NED
2nd place, silver medalist(s)		Martina Sáblíková	CZE
3rd place, bronze medalist(s)		Linda de Vries	NED

The 2015 European Speed Skating Championships were held in Chelyabinsk, Russia, from 10 to 11 January 2015.

Sven Kramer won his seventh and Ireen Wüst her fourth championship.

== Schedule ==
The schedule of events:

Date	Events
Saturday, 10 January	12:00: 500 m women 12:46: 500 m men 13:40: 3000 m women 15:19: 5000 m men
Sunday, 11 January	12:00: 1500 m women 12:59: 1500 m men 14:00: 5000 m women 14:52: 10000 m men

All times are CET (UTC+1).

== Men's championships ==
=== Day 1 ===
==== 500 metres ====
Rank	Skater	Nat.	Time	Notes	Points
1	Koen Verweij	(Netherlands)	36.20		36.200
2	David Andersson	(Sweden)	36.27		36.270
3	Jan Szymański	(Poland)	36.47		36.470
4	Denis Yuskov	(Russia)	36.49		36.490
5	Håvard Bøkko	(Norway)	36.54		36.540
6	Simen Spieler Nilsen	(Norway)	36.73		36.730
7	Haralds Silovs	(Latvia)	36.79		36.790
8	Wouter olde Heuvel	(Netherlands)	36.85		36.850
9	Sverre Lunde Pedersen	(Norway)	36.88		36.880
10	Sven Kramer	(Netherlands)	37.03		37.030
11	Bart Swings	(Belgium)	37.06		37.060
12	Piotr Puszkarski	(Poland)	37.18		37.180
13	Konrád Nagy	(Hungary)	37.28		37.280
14	Danil Sinitsyn	(Russia)	37.33		37.330
15	Bram Smallenbroek	(Austria)	37.35		37.350
16	Andrea Giovannini	(Italy)	37.38		37.380
17	Vitaly Mikhailov	(Belarus)	37.47		37.470
18	Luca Stefani	(Italy)	37.72		37.720
19	Jonas Pflug	(Germany)	38.47		38.470
20	Viktor Hald Thorup	(Denmark)	38.74		38.740
21	Martin Hänggi	(Switzerland)	39.87		39.870

==== 5000 metres ====
Rank	Skater	Nat.	Time	Notes	Points
1	Sven Kramer	(Netherlands)	6:17.32		37.732
2	Wouter olde Heuvel	(Netherlands)	6:22.32		38.232
3	Sverre Lunde Pedersen	(Norway)	6:22.98		38.298
4	Koen Verweij	(Netherlands)	6:23.86		38.386
5	Bart Swings	(Belgium)	6:26.42		38.642
6	Denis Yuskov	(Russia)	6:27.43		38.743
7	Haralds Silovs	(Latvia)	6:31.68		39.168
8	Danil Sinitsyn	(Russia)	6:32.61		39.261
9	Håvard Bøkko	(Norway)	6:33.97		39.397
10	Jonas Pflug	(Germany)	6:36.45		39.645
11	Jan Szymański	(Poland)	6:36.49		39.649
12	Andrea Giovannini	(Italy)	6:39.04		39.904
13	Luca Stefani	(Italy)	6:44.61		40.461
14	Piotr Puszkarski	(Poland)	6:45.17		40.517
15	Vitaly Mikhailov	(Belarus)	6:45.82		40.582
16	Martin Hänggi	(Switzerland)	6:47.57		40.757
17	Simen Spieler Nilsen	(Norway)	6:48.95		40.895
18	Bram Smallenbroek	(Austria)	6:49.74		40.974
19	Konrád Nagy	(Hungary)	6:53.53		41.353
20	Viktor Hald Thorup	(Denmark)	6:57.83		41.783
21	David Andersson	(Sweden)	7:19.90		43.990

=== Day 2 ===
==== 1500 metres ====
Rank	Skater	Nat.	Time	Notes	Points
1	Denis Yuskov	(Russia)	1:46.22		35.406
2	Koen Verweij	(Netherlands)	1:46.28		35.426
3	Bart Swings	(Belgium)	1:47.08		35.693
4	Sverre Lunde Pedersen	(Norway)	1:47.32		35.773
5	Sven Kramer	(Netherlands)	1:47.41		35.803
6	Haralds Silovs	(Latvia)	1:47.54		35.846
7	Jan Szymański	(Poland)	1:48.47		36.156
8	Danil Sinitsyn	(Russia)	1:48.81		36.270
9	Wouter olde Heuvel	(Netherlands)	1:49.30		36.433
10	Håvard Bøkko	(Norway)	1:49.43		36.476
11	Bram Smallenbroek	(Austria)	1:49.52		36.506
12	Konrád Nagy	(Hungary)	1:49.94		36.646
13	Piotr Puszkarski	(Poland)	1:50.03		36.676
14	Simen Spieler Nilsen	(Norway)	1:50.39		36.796
15	Andrea Giovannini	(Italy)	1:50.47		36.823
16	Luca Stefani	(Italy)	1:51.00		37.000
17	Jonas Pflug	(Germany)	1:52.32		37.440
18	Vitaly Mikhailov	(Belarus)	1:52.68		37.560
19	David Andersson	(Sweden)	1:53.60		37.866
20	Viktor Hald Thorup	(Denmark)	1:53.95		37.983
21	Martin Hänggi	(Switzerland)	1:57.42		39.140

==== 10000 metres ====
Rank	Skater	Nat.	Time	Notes	Points
1	Sven Kramer	(Netherlands)	13:07.27		39.363
2	Sverre Lunde Pedersen	(Norway)	13:16.27		39.813
3	Bart Swings	(Belgium)	13:21.06		40.053
4	Denis Yuskov	(Russia)	13:21.15		40.057
5	Koen Verweij	(Netherlands)	13:21.90		40.095
6	Wouter olde Heuvel	(Netherlands)	13:24.95		40.247
7	Danil Sinitsyn	(Russia)	13:50.40		41.520
8	Haralds Silovs	(Latvia)	14:02.15		42.107

=== Final ranking ===
Rank	Skater	Nat.	500 m	5000 m	1500 m	10000 m	Points
1st place, gold medalist(s)	Sven Kramer	(Netherlands)	37.03 (10)	6:17.32 (1)	1:47.41 (5)	13:07.27 (1)	149.928
2nd place, silver medalist(s)	Koen Verweij	(Netherlands)	36.20 (1)	6:23.86 (4)	1:46.28 (2)	13:21.90 (5)	150.107
3rd place, bronze medalist(s)	Denis Yuskov	(Russia)	36.49 (4)	6:27.43 (6)	1:46.22 (1)	13:21.15 (4)	150.696
4	Sverre Lunde Pedersen	(Norway)	36.88 (9)	6:22.98 (3)	1:47.32 (4)	13:16.27 (2)	150.764
5	Bart Swings	(Belgium)	37.06 (11)	6:26.42 (5)	1:47.08 (3)	13:21.06 (3)	151.448
6	Wouter olde Heuvel	(Netherlands)	36.85 (8)	6:22.32 (2)	1:49.30 (9)	13:24.95 (6)	151.762
7	Haralds Silovs	(Latvia)	36.79 (7)	6:31.68 (7)	1:47.54 (6)	14:02.15 (8)	153.911
8	Danil Sinitsyn	(Russia)	37.33 (14)	6:32.61 (8)	1:48.81 (8)	13:50.40 (7)	154.381
9	Jan Szymański	(Poland)	36.47 (3)	6:36.49 (11)	1:48.47 (7)		112.275
10	Håvard Bøkko	(Norway)	36.54 (5)	6:33.97 (9)	1:49.43 (10)		112.413
11	Andrea Giovannini	(Italy)	37.38 (16)	6:39.04 (12)	1:50.47 (15)		114.107
12	Piotr Puszkarski	(Poland)	37.18 (12)	6:45.17 (14)	1:50.03 (13)		114.373
13	Simen Spieler Nilsen	(Norway)	36.73 (6)	6:48.95 (17)	1:50.39 (14)		114.421
14	Bram Smallenbroek	(Austria)	37.35 (15)	6:49.74 (18)	1:49.52 (11)		114.830
15	Luca Stefani	(Italy)	37.72 (18)	6:44.61 (13)	1:51.00 (16)		115.181
16	Konrád Nagy	(Hungary)	37.28 (13)	6:53.53 (19)	1:49.94 (12)		115.279
17	Jonas Pflug	(Germany)	38.47 (19)	6:36.45 (10)	1:52.32 (17)		115.555
18	Vitaly Mikhailov	(Belarus)	37.47 (17)	6:45.82 (15)	1:52.68 (18)		115.612
19	David Andersson	(Sweden)	36.27 (2)	7:19.90 (21)	1:53.60 (19)		118.126
20	Viktor Hald Thorup	(Denmark)	38.74 (20)	6:57.83 (20)	1:53.95 (20)		118.506
21	Martin Hänggi	(Switzerland)	39.87 (21)	6:47.57 (16)	1:57.42 (21)		119.767

== Women's championships ==
=== Day 1 ===
==== 500 metres ====
Rank	Skater	Nat.	Time	Notes	Points
1	Ireen Wüst	(Netherlands)	39.24		39.240
2	Ida Njåtun	(Norway)	39.66		39.660
3	Yuliya Skokova	(Russia)	39.72		39.720
4	Hege Bøkko	(Norway)	39.89		39.890
5	Linda de Vries	(Netherlands)	40.05		40.050
6	Martina Sáblíková	(Czech Republic)	40.06		40.060
7	Jorien Voorhuis	(Netherlands)	40.11		40.110
8	Olga Graf	(Russia)	40.60		40.600
9	Natalya Voronina	(Russia)	40.64		40.640
10	Nikola Zdráhalová	(Czech Republic)	40.97		40.970
11	Marina Zueva	(Belarus)	41.03		41.030
12	Isabell Ost	(Germany)	41.15		41.150
13	Katarzyna Woźniak	(Poland)	41.16		41.160
14	Jelena Peeters	(Belgium)	41.48		41.480
15	Aleksandra Goss	(Poland)	41.49		41.490
16	Jennifer Bay	(Germany)	41.75		41.750
17	Eva Lagrange	(Sweden)	42.11		42.110
18	Saskia Alusalu	(Estonia)	42.89		42.890

==== 3000 metres ====
Rank	Skater	Nat.	Time	Notes	Points
1	Martina Sáblíková	(Czech Republic)	4:05.23		40.871
2	Ireen Wüst	(Netherlands)	4:07.49		41.248
3	Linda de Vries	(Netherlands)	4:07.50		41.250
4	Olga Graf	(Russia)	4:08.93		41.488
5	Jorien Voorhuis	(Netherlands)	4:10.94		41.823
6	Ida Njåtun	(Norway)	4:11.33		41.888
7	Yuliya Skokova	(Russia)	4:13.02		42.170
8	Natalya Voronina	(Russia)	4:13.60		42.266
9	Katarzyna Woźniak	(Poland)	4:16.43		42.738
10	Jelena Peeters	(Belgium)	4:16.96		42.826
11	Isabell Ost	(Germany)	4:18.41		43.068
12	Marina Zueva	(Belarus)	4:19.21		43.201
13	Jennifer Bay	(Germany)	4:19.46		43.243
14	Aleksandra Goss	(Poland)	4:19.92		43.320
15	Nikola Zdráhalová	(Czech Republic)	4:21.37		43.561
16	Saskia Alusalu	(Estonia)	4:22.66		43.776
17	Hege Bøkko	(Norway)	4:29.88		44.980
18	Eva Lagrange	(Sweden)	4:31.95		45.325

=== Day 2 ===
==== 1500 metres ====
Rank	Skater	Nat.	Time	Notes	Points
1	Ireen Wüst	(Netherlands)	1:56.05		38.683
2	Ida Njåtun	(Norway)	1:58.09		39.363
3	Martina Sáblíková	(Czech Republic)	1:58.24		39.413
4	Linda de Vries	(Netherlands)	1:58.33		39.443
5	Olga Graf	(Russia)	1:58.60		39.533
6	Jorien Voorhuis	(Netherlands)	1:59.01		39.670
7	Yuliya Skokova	(Russia)	1:59.27		39.756
8	Natalya Voronina	(Russia)	2:01.69		40.563
9	Isabell Ost	(Germany)	2:02.04		40.680
10	Katarzyna Woźniak	(Poland)	2:03.29		41.096
11	Hege Bøkko	(Norway)	2:03.42		41.140
12	Jelena Peeters	(Belgium)	2:03.51		41.170
13	Jennifer Bay	(Germany)	2:03.53		41.176
14	Marina Zueva	(Belarus)	2:04.21		41.403
15	Aleksandra Goss	(Poland)	2:04.46		41.486
16	Nikola Zdráhalová	(Czech Republic)	2:06.77		42.256
17	Saskia Alusalu	(Estonia)	2:07.39		42.463
18	Eva Lagrange	(Sweden)	2:08.72		42.906

==== 5000 metres ====
Rank	Skater	Nat.	Time	Notes	Points
1	Martina Sáblíková	(Czech Republic)	7:00.70		42.070
2	Ireen Wüst	(Netherlands)	7:05.63		42.563
3	Olga Graf	(Russia)	7:09.10		42.910
4	Linda de Vries	(Netherlands)	7:09.52		42.952
5	Jorien Voorhuis	(Netherlands)	7:14.00		43.400
6	Natalya Voronina	(Russia)	7:20.66		44.066
7	Ida Njåtun	(Norway)	7:21.82		44.182
8	Yuliya Skokova	(Russia)	7:58.60		47.860

=== Final ranking ===
Rank	Skater	Nat.	500 m	3000 m	1500 m	5000 m	Points
1st place, gold medalist(s)	Ireen Wüst	(Netherlands)	39.24 (1)	4:07.49 (2)	1:56.05 (1)	7:05.63 (2)	161.734
2nd place, silver medalist(s)	Martina Sáblíková	(Czech Republic)	40.06 (6)	4:05.23 (1)	1:58.24 (3)	7:00.70 (1)	162.414
3rd place, bronze medalist(s)	Linda de Vries	(Netherlands)	40.05 (5)	4:07.50 (3)	1:58.33 (4)	7:09.52 (4)	163.695
4	Olga Graf	(Russia)	40.60 (8)	4:08.93 (4)	1:58.60 (5)	7:09.10 (3)	164.531
5	Jorien Voorhuis	(Netherlands)	40.11 (7)	4:10.94 (5)	1:59.01 (6)	7:14.00 (5)	165.003
6	Ida Njåtun	(Norway)	39.66 (2)	4:11.33 (6)	1:58.09 (2)	7:21.82 (7)	165.093
7	Natalya Voronina	(Russia)	40.64 (9)	4:13.60 (8)	2:01.69 (8)	7:20.66 (6)	167.535
8	Yuliya Skokova	(Russia)	39.72 (3)	4:13.02 (7)	1:59.27 (7)	7:58.60 (8)	169.506
9	Isabell Ost	(Germany)	41.15 (12)	4:18.41 (11)	2:02.04 (9)		124.898
10	Katarzyna Woźniak	(Poland)	41.16 (13)	4:16.43 (9)	2:03.29 (10)		124.994
11	Jelena Peeters	(Belgium)	41.48 (14)	4:16.96 (10)	2:03.51 (12)		125.476
12	Marina Zueva	(Belarus)	41.03 (11)	4:19.21 (12)	2:04.21 (14)		125.634
13	Hege Bøkko	(Norway)	39.89 (4)	4:29.88 (17)	2:03.42 (11)		126.010
14	Jennifer Bay	(Germany)	41.75 (16)	4:19.46 (13)	2:03.53 (13)		126.169
15	Aleksandra Goss	(Poland)	41.49 (15)	4:19.92 (14)	2:04.46 (15)		126.296
16	Nikola Zdráhalová	(Czech Republic)	40.97 (10)	4:21.37 (15)	2:06.77 (16)		126.787
17	Saskia Alusalu	(Estonia)	42.89 (18)	4:22.66 (16)	2:07.39 (17)		129.129
18	Eva Lagrange	(Sweden)	42.11 (17)	4:31.95 (18)	2:08.72 (18)		130.341

== See also ==
- 2015 World Allround Speed Skating Championships
