= 2014 World Allround Speed Skating Championships =

International speed skating competition

World Allround Speed Skating Championships
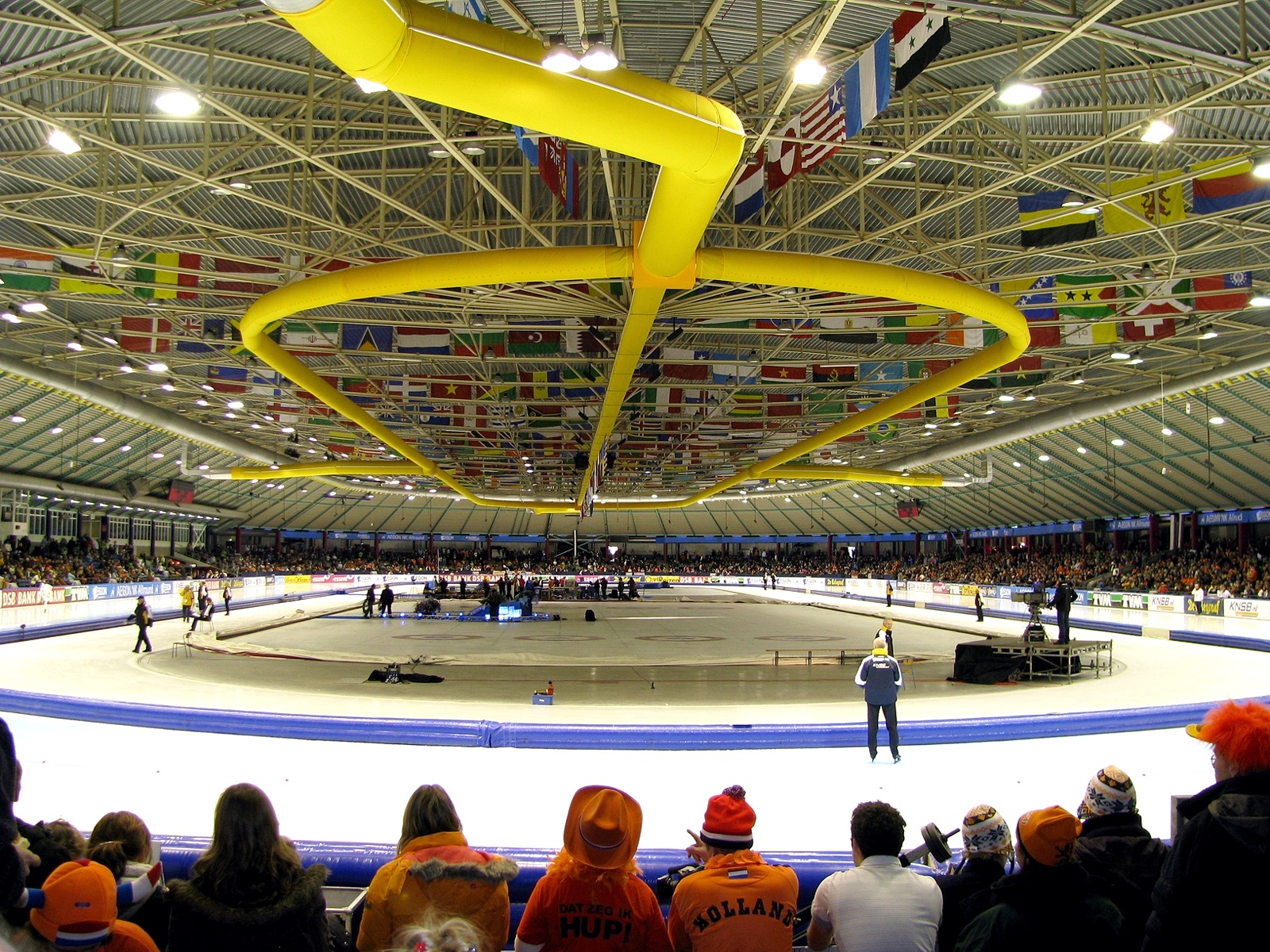
- Thialf (Heerenveen)
- Location: Heerenveen, Netherlands
- Venue: Thialf
- Dates: 22–23 March

Medalist men
1st place, gold medalist(s)		Koen Verweij	NED
2nd place, silver medalist(s)		Jan Blokhuijsen	NED
3rd place, bronze medalist(s)		Denis Yuskov	RUS

Medalist women
1st place, gold medalist(s)		Ireen Wüst	NED
2nd place, silver medalist(s)		Olga Graf	RUS
3rd place, bronze medalist(s)		Yvonne Nauta	NED

The 2014 World Allround Speed Skating Championships took place at the indoor ice rink of the Thialf arena in Heerenveen, Netherlands, on 22–23 March 2014.

Ireen Wüst won the women's title for the fifth time while Koen Verweij won his first world title.

== Rules ==
All 24 participating skaters are allowed to skate the first three distances; 8 skaters may take part on the fourth distance. These 8 skaters are determined by taking the standings on the longest of the first three distances, as well as the samalog standings after three distances, and comparing these lists as follows:

1. Skaters among the top 8 on both lists are qualified.
2. To make up a total of 8, skaters are then added in order of their best rank on either list. Samalog standings take precedence over the longest-distance standings in the event of a tie.

== Men's championships ==
=== 500 metres ===
Place	Athlete	Country	Time	Points
1	Konrad Niedźwiedzki	Poland	35.91	35.910
2	Håvard Bøkko	Norway	35.95	35.950
2	Koen Verweij	Netherlands	35.95	35.950
4	Sun Longjiang	China	36.17	36.170
5	Wouter olde Heuvel	Netherlands	36.34	36.340
5	Yang Fan	China	36.34	36.340
7	Jan Blokhuijsen	Netherlands	36.41	36.410
8	Jan Szymański	Poland	36.42	36.420
9	Haralds Silovs	Latvia	36.61	36.610
10	Sverre Lunde Pedersen	Norway	36.72	36.720
11	Denis Yuskov	Russia	36.75	36.750
12	Bart Swings	Belgium	36.88	36.880
13	Bram Smallenbroek	Austria	36.92	36.920
13	Renz Rotteveel	Netherlands	36.92	36.920
15	Sergey Gryaztsov	Russia	36.93	36.930
16	Edwin Park	United States	36.94	36.940
17	Andrea Giovannini	Italy	37.04	37.040
18	Fredrik van der Horst	Norway	37.17	37.170
19	Dmitry Babenko	Kazakhstan	37.29	37.290
20	Luca Stefani	Italy	37.56	37.560
21	Nils van der Poel	Sweden	37.92	37.920
22	Jordan Belchos	Canada	38.74	38.740
23	Patrick Meek	United States	39.13	39.130
24	Piotr Puszkarski	Poland	55.23	55.230

=== 5000 metres ===
Place	Athlete	Country	Time	Points
1	Jan Blokhuijsen	Netherlands	6:17.78	37.778
2	Koen Verweij	Netherlands	6:19.69	37.969
3	Denis Yuskov	Russia	6:20.15	38.015
4	Renz Rotteveel	Netherlands	6:22.39	38.239
5	Sverre Lunde Pedersen	Norway	6:23.72	38.372
6	Håvard Bøkko	Norway	6:26.14	38.614
7	Bart Swings	Belgium	6:26.78	38.678
8	Wouter olde Heuvel	Netherlands	6:28.59	38.859
9	Nils van der Poel	Sweden	6:28.68	38.868
10	Dmitry Babenko	Kazakhstan	6:30.11	39.011
11	Jan Szymański	Poland	6:31.38	39.138
12	Sergey Gryaztsov	Russia	6:32.93	39.293
13	Patrick Meek	United States	6:33.68	39.368
14	Andrea Giovannini	Italy	6:34.90	39.490
15	Konrad Niedźwiedzki	Poland	6:36.11	39.611
16	Fredrik van der Horst	Norway	6:36.90	39.690
17	Haralds Silovs	Latvia	6:37.63	39.763
18	Sun Longjiang	China	6:38.46	39.846
19	Jordan Belchos	Canada	6:38.92	39.892
20	Luca Stefani	Italy	6:39.02	39.902
21	Bram Smallenbroek	Austria	6:43.99	40.399
22	Piotr Puszkarski	Poland	6:46.44	40.644
23	Yang Fan	China	6:48.41	40.841
24	Edwin Park	United States	6:49.60	40.960

=== 1500 metres ===
Place	Athlete	Country	Time	Points
1	Denis Yuskov	Russia	1:46.12	35.373
2	Bart Swings	Belgium	1:46.47	35.490
2	Koen Verweij	Netherlands	1:46.47	35.490
4	Sverre Lunde Pedersen	Norway	1:46.86	35.620
5	Renz Rotteveel	Netherlands	1:46.94	35.646
6	Jan Blokhuijsen	Netherlands	1:47.15	35.716
7	Konrad Niedźwiedzki	Poland	1:47.31	35.770
8	Jan Szymański	Poland	1:47.74	35.913
9	Håvard Bøkko	Norway	1:48.01	36.003
10	Haralds Silovs	Latvia	1:48.05	36.016
11	Bram Smallenbroek	Austria	1:48.42	36.140
12	Dmitry Babenko	Kazakhstan	1:48.43	36.143
13	Sergey Gryaztsov	Russia	1:48.55	36.183
14	Wouter olde Heuvel	Netherlands	1:48.92	36.306
15	Yang Fan	China	1:49.37	36.456
16	Fredrik van der Horst	Norway	1:49.82	36.606
17	Piotr Puszkarski	Poland	1:50.55	36.850
18	Sun Longjiang	China	1:50.83	36.943
19	Luca Stefani	Italy	1:50.96	36.986
20	Andrea Giovannini	Italy	1:51.10	37.033
21	Nils van der Poel	Sweden	1:51.19	37.063
22	Edwin Park	United States	1:51.99	37.330
23	Jordan Belchos	Canada	1:52.03	37.343
24	Patrick Meek	United States	1:53.17	37.723

=== 10000 metres ===
Place	Athlete	Country	Time	Points
1	Jan Blokhuijsen	Netherlands	13:13.93	39.696
2	Denis Yuskov	Russia	13:17.84	39.892
3	Koen Verweij	Netherlands	13:19.12	39.956
4	Bart Swings	Belgium	13:29.42	40.471
5	Sverre Lunde Pedersen	Norway	13:30.10	40.505
6	Renz Rotteveel	Netherlands	13:36.52	40.826
7	Håvard Bøkko	Norway	13:40.88	41.044
8	Konrad Niedźwiedzki	Poland	14:10.58	42.529

=== Allround results ===
Place	Athlete	Country	500 m	5000 m	1500 m	10000 m	Points
1st place, gold medalist(s)	Koen Verweij	Netherlands	35.95	6:19.69	1:46.47	13:19.12	149.365
2nd place, silver medalist(s)	Jan Blokhuijsen	Netherlands	36.41	6:17.78	1:47.15	13:13.93	149.600
3rd place, bronze medalist(s)	Denis Yuskov	Russia	36.75	6:20.15	1:46.12	13:17.84	150.030
4	Sverre Lunde Pedersen	Norway	36.72	6:23.72	1:46.86	13:30.10	151.217
5	Bart Swings	Belgium	36.88	6:26.78	1:46.47	13:29.42	151.519
6	Håvard Bøkko	Norway	35.95	6:26.14	1:48.01	13:40.88	151.611
7	Renz Rotteveel	Netherlands	36.92	6:22.39	1:46.94	13:36.52	151.631
8	Konrad Niedźwiedzki	Poland	35.91	6:36.11	1:47.31	14:10.58	153.820
9	Jan Szymański	Poland	36.42	6:31.38	1:47.74		111.471
10	Wouter olde Heuvel	Netherlands	36.34	6:28.59	1:48.92		111.505
11	Haralds Silovs	Latvia	36.61	6:37.63	1:48.05		112.389
12	Sergey Gryaztsov	Russia	36.93	6:32.93	1:48.55		112.406
13	Dmitry Babenko	Kazakhstan	37.29	6:30.11	1:48.43		112.444
14	Sun Longjiang	China	36.17	6:38.46	1:50.83		112.959
15	Bram Smallenbroek	Austria	36.92	6:43.99	1:48.42		113.459
16	Fredrik van der Horst	Norway	37.17	6:36.90	1:49.82		113.466
17	Andrea Giovannini	Italy	37.04	6:34.90	1:51.10		113.563
18	Yang Fan	China	36.34	6:48.41	1:49.37		113.637
19	Nils van der Poel	Sweden	37.92	6:28.68	1:51.19		113.851
20	Luca Stefani	Italy	37.56	6:39.02	1:50.96		114.448
21	Edwin Park	United States	36.94	6:49.60	1:51.99		115.230
22	Jordan Belchos	Canada	38.74	6:38.92	1:52.03		115.975
23	Patrick Meek	United States	39.13	6:33.68	1:53.17		116.221
24	Piotr Puszkarski	Poland	55.23	6:46.44	1:50.55		132.724

== Women's championships ==
=== 500 metres ===
Place	Athlete	Country	Time	Points
1	Ireen Wüst	Netherlands	38.86	38.860
2	Yuliya Skokova	Russia	39.00	39.000
3	Yekaterina Shikhova	Russia	39.13	39.130
4	Kali Christ	Canada	39.37	39.370
5	Katarzyna Bachleda-Curuś	Poland	39.55	39.550
6	Liu Jing	China	39.57	39.570
7	Miho Takagi	Japan	39.68	39.680
8	Natalia Czerwonka	Poland	39.69	39.690
9	Shannon Rempel	Canada	39.71	39.710
10	Irene Schouten	Netherlands	39.73	39.730
11	Ida Njåtun	Norway	39.82	39.820
12	Olga Graf	Russia	39.84	39.840
13	Zhao Xin	China	39.92	39.920
14	Luiza Złotkowska	Poland	39.93	39.930
15	Diane Valkenburg	Netherlands	40.00	40.000
16	Yevgeniya Dmitriyeva	Russia	40.38	40.380
17	Li Qishi	China	40.48	40.480
18	Ivanie Blondin	Canada	40.66	40.660
19	Yvonne Nauta	Netherlands	41.09	41.090
20	Jelena Peeters	Belgium	41.39	41.390
21	Shoko Fujimura	Japan	41.99	41.990
22	Camilla-Hallås Farestveit	Norway	42.11	42.110

=== 3000 metres ===
Place	Athlete	Country	Time	Points
1	Ireen Wüst	Netherlands	3:58.83	39.805
2	Yvonne Nauta	Netherlands	4:03.20	40.533
3	Olga Graf	Russia	4:05.51	40.918
4	Diane Valkenburg	Netherlands	4:05.89	40.981
5	Irene Schouten	Netherlands	4:07.08	41.180
6	Yuliya Skokova	Russia	4:08.60	41.433
7	Katarzyna Bachleda-Curuś	Poland	4:08.75	41.458
8	Luiza Złotkowska	Poland	4:09.34	41.556
9	Jelena Peeters	Belgium	4:10.67	41.778
10	Natalia Czerwonka	Poland	4:11.26	41.876
11	Miho Takagi	Japan	4:12.62	42.103
12	Kali Christ	Canada	4:14.39	42.398
13	Shoko Fujimura	Japan	4:14.57	42.428
14	Yevgeniya Dmitriyeva	Russia	4:16.42	42.736
15	Yekaterina Shikhova	Russia	4:17.19	42.865
16	Zhao Xin	China	4:18.59	43.098
17	Li Qishi	China	4:20.21	43.368
18	Ivanie Blondin	Canada	4:22.13	43.688
19	Camilla-Hallås Farestveit	Norway	4:22.42	43.736
20	Liu Jing	China	4:22.96	43.826
21	Shannon Rempel	Canada	4:29.72	44.953
22	Ida Njåtun	Norway	DNS	-

=== 1500 metres ===
Place	Athlete	Country	Time	Points
1	Ireen Wüst	Netherlands	1:54.13	38.043
2	Olga Graf	Russia	1:55.67	38.556
3	Yuliya Skokova	Russia	1:55.99	38.663
4	Natalia Czerwonka	Poland	1:56.91	38.970
5	Yvonne Nauta	Netherlands	1:57.32	39.106
6	Katarzyna Bachleda-Curuś	Poland	1:57.73	39.243
7	Luiza Złotkowska	Poland	1:57.88	39.293
8	Kali Christ	Canada	1:58.36	39.453
9	Diane Valkenburg	Netherlands	1:58.45	39.483
10	Yekaterina Shikhova	Russia	1:58.96	39.653
11	Irene Schouten	Netherlands	1:59.49	39.830
12	Miho Takagi	Japan	1:59.68	39.893
13	Zhao Xin	China	1:59.84	39.946
14	Yevgeniya Dmitriyeva	Russia	1:59.93	39.976
15	Li Qishi	China	2:00.66	40.220
16	Jelena Peeters	Belgium	2:00.86	40.286
17	Ivanie Blondin	Canada	2:02.75	40.916
18	Shannon Rempel	Canada	2:03.43	41.143
19	Liu Jing	China	2:03.70	41.233
20	Camilla-Hallås Farestveit	Norway	2:04.23	41.410
21	Shoko Fujimura	Japan	2:04.51	41.503

=== 5000 metres ===
Place	Athlete	Country	Time	Points
1	Yvonne Nauta	Netherlands	6:57.59	41.759
2	Ireen Wüst	Netherlands	6:59.07	41.907
3	Olga Graf	Russia	7:00.01	42.001
4	Diane Valkenburg	Netherlands	7:08.11	42.811
5	Irene Schouten	Netherlands	7:11.56	43.156
6	Yuliya Skokova	Russia	7:18.50	43.850
7	Katarzyna Bachleda-Curuś	Poland	7:19.97	43.997
8	Natalia Czerwonka	Poland	7:26.98	44.698

=== Allround results ===
Place	Athlete	Country	500 m	3000 m	1500 m	5000 m	Points
1st place, gold medalist(s)	Ireen Wüst	Netherlands	38.86	3:58.83	1:54.13	6:59.07	158.615
2nd place, silver medalist(s)	Olga Graf	Russia	39.84	4:05.51	1:55.67	7:00.01	161.315
3rd place, bronze medalist(s)	Yvonne Nauta	Netherlands	41.09	4:03.20	1:57.32	6:57.59	162.488
4	Yuliya Skokova	Russia	39.00	4:08.60	1:55.99	7:18.50	162.946
5	Diane Valkenburg	Netherlands	40.00	4:05.89	1:58.45	7:08.11	163.275
6	Irene Schouten	Netherlands	39.73	4:07.08	1:59.49	7:11.56	163.896
7	Katarzyna Bachleda-Curuś	Poland	39.55	4:08.75	1:57.73	7:19.97	164.248
8	Natalia Czerwonka	Poland	39.69	4:11.26	1:56.91	7:26.98	165.234
9	Luiza Złotkowska	Poland	39.93	4:09.34	1:57.88		120.779
10	Kali Christ	Canada	39.37	4:14.39	1:58.36		121.221
11	Yekaterina Shikhova	Russia	39.13	4:17.19	1:58.96		121.648
12	Miho Takagi	Japan	39.68	4:12.62	1:59.68		121.676
13	Zhao Xin	China	39.92	4:18.59	1:59.84		122.964
14	Yevgeniya Dmitriyeva	Russia	40.38	4:16.42	1:59.93		123.092
15	Jelena Peeters	Belgium	41.39	4:10.67	2:00.86		123.454
16	Li Qishi	China	40.48	4:20.21	2:00.66		124.068
17	Liu Jing	China	39.57	4:22.96	2:03.70		124.629
18	Ivanie Blondin	Canada	40.66	4:22.13	2:02.75		125.264
19	Shannon Rempel	Canada	39.71	4:29.72	2:03.43		125.806
20	Shoko Fujimura	Japan	41.99	4:14.57	2:04.51		125.921
21	Camilla-Hallås Farestveit	Norway	42.11	4:22.42	2:04.23		127.256
22	Ida Njåtun	Norway	39.82	DNS			-

== See also ==
- Speed skating at the 2014 Winter Olympics
