= Koen Verweij =

Dutch speed skater (born 1990)

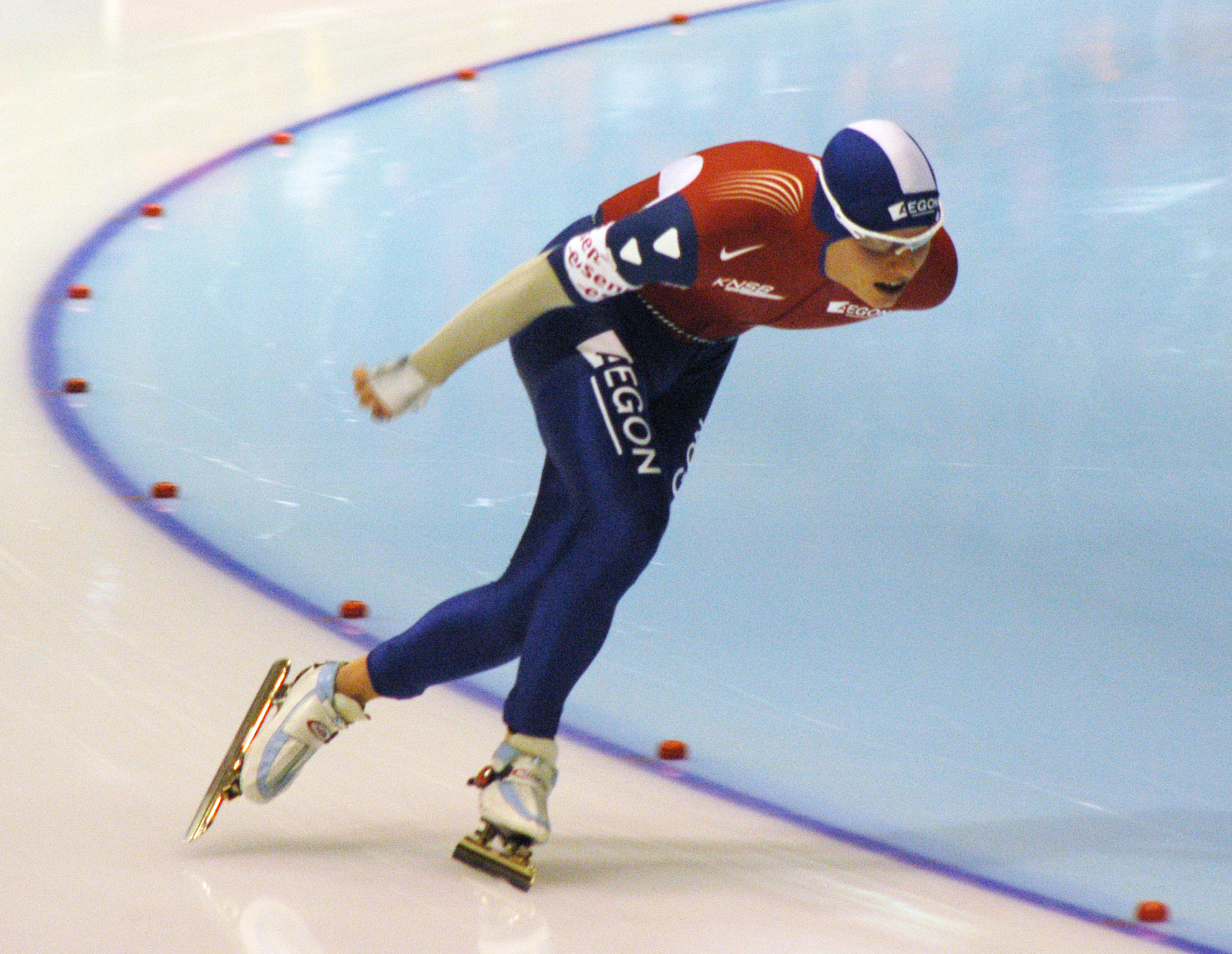
- Koen Verweij (EC Allround 2009)

Personal information
- Born: 26 August 1990 (age 35) Alkmaar, Netherlands
- Height: 182 cm (6 ft 0 in)
- Weight: 83 kg (183 lb)

Sport
- Country: Netherlands
- Sport: Speed skating
- Turned pro: 2007
Medal record
Men's speed skating
Representing Netherlands
Olympic Games
Gold medal – first place	2014 Sochi	Team pursuit
Silver medal – second place	2014 Sochi	1500 m
Bronze medal – third place	2018 Pyeongchang	Mass start
Bronze medal – third place	2018 Pyeongchang	Team pursuit
World Allround Championships
Gold medal – first place	2014 Heerenveen	Allround
Bronze medal – third place	2012 Moscow	Allround
World Single Distance Championships
Gold medal – first place	2012 Heerenveen	Team pursuit
Gold medal – first place	2013 Sochi	Team pursuit
Gold medal – first place	2015 Heerenveen	Team pursuit
Bronze medal – third place	2011 Inzell	Team pursuit
Bronze medal – third place	2015 Heerenveen	1500 m
European Allround Championships
Silver medal – second place	2014 Hamar	Allround
Silver medal – second place	2015 Chelyabinsk	Allround
Bronze medal – third place	2011 Collalbo	Allround
European Single Distance Championships
Bronze medal – third place	2018 Kolomna	1500 m

Koen Verweij (Dutch pronunciation: [ˈkuɱ‿vərˈʋɛi]; born 26 August 1990) is a former Dutch speed skater and inline speed skater. At the end of the skating season 2008–09 he made a transfer from the Jong Oranje team of the national skating union (KNSB) to the commercial team of TVM.

Verweij was the holder of the Dutch national record at the 1500 metres distance from 9 December 2017 until 10 March 2019.

== Biography ==
On 30 December 2007, Verweij skated his first 10 km race at the Dutch all-round championships at the Kardinge ice track in Groningen. He finished the tournament in fifth position which resulted in his qualification as first reserve skater for the European all-round championship in Kolomna. This was a remarkable accomplishment, since he was a junior at that moment, and posted faster times than Sven Kramer skated at the same age.

Later in the same season, he participated in the world junior championships in Changchun. He won the silver medal just behind his teammate Jan Blokhuijsen and in front of his other teammate Berden de Vries. It was the first time since 1997 that all medals were captured by skaters from the same country.

At the Dutch all-round championships 2009, Verweij finished 4th, partly due to his strong improvement of his 10 km personal record and qualified for the European all-round championships. Despite a fall on the 500 m, he managed to finish the tournament in 12th position. His season was crowned with a victory at the World Junior Skating championships where he won the 3000 m, the 5000 m, the all-round title, and the team pursuit. Because of these outstanding results he won the Egbert van't Oever Encouragement award for the best young Dutch skater.

At the 2014 Olympic Games, Verweij finished 2nd in the 1500m event, 0.003 seconds behind Zbigniew Bródka.

On 14 July 2015, he announced that he was leaving Team Corendon after one season.

== Records ==
=== Personal records ===
Personal records
Men's speed skating
Event	Result	Date	Location	Notes
500 meter	35.64	12 February 2011	Calgary	
1000 meter	1:06.94	10 December 2017	Salt Lake City	
1500 meter	1:41.63	9 December 2017	Salt Lake City	Dutch national record until 10 March 2019
3000 meter	3:42.86	25 February 2017	Inzell	
5000 meter	6:09.51	10 November 2013	Calgary	
10000 meter	13:08.97	13 February 2011	Calgary	

Verweij reached 5th position in the adelskalender on 15 November 2013. As of 10 March 2019, he is in 9th position with 145.915 points

=== World records ===
Nr.	Event	Result	Date	Location	Notes
1.	Team pursuit	*3.37,17	9 November 2013	Olympic Oval, Calgary	
2.	Team pursuit	*3.35,60	16 November 2013	Utah Olympic Oval, Salt Lake City	World record until 15 February 2020

* together with Sven Kramer and Jan Blokhuijsen

== Tournament overview ==
Season	Dutch Championships Single Distances	Dutch Championships Allround	European Championships	World Championships Allround	World Championships Single Distances	Olympic Games	World Cup GWC	Dutch Championships Allround Junior	World Championships Junior Allround
2007–08		GRONINGEN 4th 500m 7th 5000m 7th 1500m 8th 10000m 5th overall							CHANGCHUN 6th 500m (silver) 3000m (bronze) 1500m (gold) 5000m (silver) overall (gold) Team pursuit
2008–09	HEERENVEEN 8th 1500m 7th 5000m	HEERENVEEN 7th 500m 6th 5000m 4th 1500m 5th 10000m 4th overall	HEERENVEEN 31st 500m 6th 5000m 7th 1500m 8th 10000m 12th overall					(gold) 500m (gold) 3000m (silver) 1500m (gold) 5000m (gold) overall	ZAKOPANE 5th 500m (gold) 3000m (bronze) 1500m (gold) overall (gold) Team pursuit
2009–10	HEERENVEEN 9th 1500m 4th 5000m 8th 10000m	HEERENVEEN (bronze) 500m 6th 5000m 4th 1500m 5th 10000m (bronze) overall					21st 5km/10km (silver) Team pursuit	5th 500m (gold) 3000m (gold) 1500m (gold) 5000m (gold) overall	MOSCOW 4th 500m (gold) 3000m (silver) 1500m (gold) 5000m (gold) overall (bronze) 1000m (bronze) Team pursuit
2010–11	HEERENVEEN 10th 1000m 6th 1500m 7th 5000m	HEERENVEEN (gold) 500m 4th 5000m 4th 1500m (bronze) 10000m (silver) overall	COLLALBO (bronze) 500m (silver) 5000m 6th 1500m 4th 10000m (bronze) overall	CALGARY 5th 500m (silver) 5000m 7th 1500m 5th 10000m 4th overall	INZELL (bronze) Team pursuit		36th 1500m 8th Team pursuit		
2011–12	HEERENVEEN 10th 1500m 10th 5000m	HEERENVEEN 4th 500m (silver) 5000m (bronze) 1500m (bronze) 10000m (silver) overall	BUDAPEST 10th 500m 7th 5000m 5th 1500m 5th 10000 4th overall	MOSCOW (silver) 500m 4th 5000m 6th 1500m 5th 10000m (bronze) overall	HEERENVEEN 14th 1500m (gold) Team pursuit		11th 1500m 33rd 5km/10km (gold) Team pursuit 28th GWC		
2012–13	HEERENVEEN 8th 1000m DQ 1500m 9th 5000m	HEERENVEEN 26th 500m DNS 5000m DNS 1500m DNS 10000m NC overall		HAMAR 6th 500m 6th 5000m 9th 1500m DNQ 10000m 9th overall	SOCHI 14th 1500m (gold) Team pursuit		9th 1500m (gold) Team pursuit 27th GWC		
2013–14	HEERENVEEN (silver) 1000m (gold) 1500m 5th 5000m	AMSTERDAM (gold) 500m (gold) 5000m (gold) 1500m (silver) 10000m (gold) overall	HAMAR 4th 500m 4th 5000m (gold) 1500m (silver) 10000m (silver) overall	HEERENVEEN (silver) 500m (silver) 5000m (silver) 1500m (bronze) 10000m (gold) overall		SOCHI 6th 1000m (silver) 1500m (gold) Team pursuit	5th 1000m (gold) 1500m 24th 5km/10km (gold) Team pursuit (silver) GWC		
2014–15	HEERENVEEN (bronze) 1000m HEERENVEEN (silver) 1500m 6th 5000m	HEERENVEEN (gold) 500m 6th 5000m (silver) 1500m 6th 10000m (bronze) overall	CHELYABINSK (gold) 500m 4th 5000m (silver) 1500m 5th 10000m (silver) overall	CALGARY DNF 500m WDR 5000m DNS 1500m DNS 10000m NC overall	HEERENVEEN (bronze) 1500m (gold) Team pursuit		16th 1000m 11th 1500m 24th 5km/10km 42nd Mass start 32nd GWC		
2017–18									
2016–17	HEERENVEEN 4th 1000m 4th 1500m	HEERENVEEN (gold) 500m 9th 5000m DNS 1500m DNS 10000m NC overall							
2017–18	HEERENVEEN (bronze) 1000m (gold) 1500m					GANGNEUNG 9th 1000m 11th 1500m (bronze) Mass start (bronze) Team pursuit	11th 1000m 4th 1500m (bronze) Team pursuit		
2018–19									
2019–20	HEERENVEEN 5th 1000m (bronze) 1500m (silver) Mass start						43rd 1000m 24th 1500m		
2020–21		HEERENVEEN (bronze) 500m 12th 5000m (bronze) 1500m 7th 10000m 5th overall							

== World Cup overview ==
Season	1000 meter						
2009–2010							
2010–2011							
2011–2012							
2012–2013							
2013–2014	4th	9th	8th	–	4th	5th	
2014–2015	6th	7th	13th	–	–	–	
2017–2018	6th	–	–	2nd place, silver medalist(s)	6th	–	–
2019–2020	–	–	–	4th(b)	–		

Season	1500 meter					
2009–2010						
2010–2011	–	–	3rd(b)	–	–	–
2011–2012	–	–	–	1st(b)	9th	3rd place, bronze medalist(s)
2012–2013	10th	1st place, gold medalist(s)	12th	4th	11th	13th
2013–2014	1st place, gold medalist(s)	3rd place, bronze medalist(s)	2nd place, silver medalist(s)	–	3rd place, bronze medalist(s)	2nd place, silver medalist(s)
2014–2015	3rd place, bronze medalist(s)	5th	9th	–	–	–
2017–2018						
2019–2020	1st(b)	–	–	1st(b)	–	

Season	5000/10000 meter					
2009–2010	7th	11th	–	–	–	–
2010–2011						
2011–2012	–	–	–	2nd(b)	–	–
2012–2013						
2013–2014	5th	–	–	–	–	–
2014–2015	6th	–	–	–	–	–
2017–2018						
2019–2020						

Season	Team pursuit			
2009–2010	1st place, gold medalist(s)	–	–	–
2010–2011	3rd place, bronze medalist(s)	5th	–	–
2011–2012	–	–	11th	1st place, gold medalist(s)
2012–2013	1st place, gold medalist(s)	1st place, gold medalist(s)	1st place, gold medalist(s)	1st place, gold medalist(s)
2013–2014	1st place, gold medalist(s)	1st place, gold medalist(s)	–	–
2014–2015				
2017–2018	10th	1st place, gold medalist(s)	–	–
2019–2020				

Season	Mass start			
2009–2010				
2010–2011				
2011–2012				
2012–2013				
2013–2014				
2014–2015	–	21st	–	–
2017–2018				
2019–2020				

- – = Did not participate
- (b) = Division B
- DNS = Did not start
- DNQ = Did not qualify
- DQ = Disqualified
- NC = No classification

== Medals won ==
Championship	Gold (gold)	Silver (silver)	Bronze (bronze)
Olympic Games	1	1	2
Dutch Single Distances	2	3	3
Dutch Allround	7	5	8
European Allround	2	5	2
World Single Distances	1	5	2
World Allround	3	0	2
World Cup	14	3	7
World Junior	8	3	4
