= 2014 KNSB Dutch Single Distance Championships – Men's 1500 m =

Dutch speed skating competition

- Venue: Thialf, Heerenveen
- Dates: 26 October 2013
- Competitors: 24 skaters

Medalist men
1st place, gold medalist(s)		Koen Verweij	NED
2nd place, silver medalist(s)		Kjeld Nuis	NED
3rd place, bronze medalist(s)		Rhian Ket	NED

The men's 1500 meter at the 2014 KNSB Dutch Single Distance Championships took place in Heerenveen at the Thialf ice skating rink on Saturday 26 October 2013. Although this tournament was held in 2013 it was part of the speed skating season 2013–2014. There were 24 participants.

== Statistics ==
=== Result ===
Position	Skater	Heat	Lane	Time
1st place, gold medalist(s)	Koen Verweij	9	O	1:46.22
2nd place, silver medalist(s)	Kjeld Nuis	9	I	1:46.94
3rd place, bronze medalist(s)	Rhian Ket	7	O	1:46.98
4	Mark Tuitert	12	I	1:47.17
5	Wouter olde Heuvel	6	O	1:47.54
6	Jan Blokhuijsen	10	O	1:47.57
7	Stefan Groothuis	12	O	1:47.68
8	Pim Schipper	7	I	1:47.80
9	Thomas Krol	5	I	1:47.88
10	Maurice Vriend	11	O	1:48.68
11	Douwe de Vries	10	I	1:48.79
12	Sjoerd de Vries	8	O	1:48.93
13	Patrick Roest	2	O	1:49.10
14	Kai Verbij	4	I	1:49.18
15	Erben Wennemars	4	O	1:49.49
16	Jos de Vos	3	O	1:49.66
17	Renz Rotteveel	11	I	1:50.19
18	Tim Roelofsen	5	O	1:50.42
19	Thom van Beek	1	O	1:50.59
20	Frank Hermans	6	I	1:50.74
21	Wesly Dijs	3	I	1:51.59
22	Gerben Jorritsma	1	I	1:51.81
23	Lucas van Alphen	8	I	1:51.94
24	Tom Terpstra	2	I	1:52.59

=== Draw ===
Heat	Inside lane	Outside lane
1	Gerben Jorritsma	Thom van Beek
2	Tom Terpstra	Patrick Roest
3	Wesly Dijs	Jos de Vos
4	Kai Verbij	Erben Wennemars
5	Thomas Krol	Tim Roelofsen
6	Frank Hermans	Wouter olde Heuvel
7	Pim Schipper	Rhian Ket
8	Lucas van Alphen	Sjoerd de Vries
9	Kjeld Nuis	Koen Verweij
10	Douwe de Vries	Jan Blokhuijsen
11	Renz Rotteveel	Maurice Vriend
12	Mark Tuitert	Stefan Groothuis
