= 2014 KNSB Dutch Single Distance Championships – Men's 5000 m =

Dutch speed skating competition

- Venue: Thialf, Heerenveen
- Dates: 25 October 2013
- Competitors: 20 skaters

Medalist men
1st place, gold medalist(s)		Sven Kramer	NED
2nd place, silver medalist(s)		Jorrit Bergsma	NED
3rd place, bronze medalist(s)		Bob de Jong	NED

The men's 5000 meter at the 2014 KNSB Dutch Single Distance Championships took place in Heerenveen at the Thialf ice skating rink on Friday 25 October 2013. There were 20 participants.

== Statistics ==
=== Result ===
Position	Skater	Time
1st place, gold medalist(s)	Sven Kramer	6:12.89
2nd place, silver medalist(s)	Jorrit Bergsma	6:17.79
3rd place, bronze medalist(s)	Bob de Jong	6:19.20
4	Jan Blokhuijsen	6:19.52
5	Koen Verweij	6:20.19
6	Douwe de Vries	6:23.24
7	Rob Hadders	6:23.64
8	Robert Bovenhuis	6:24.19 PR
9	Arjen van der Kieft	6:24.34
10	Frank Vreugdenhil	6:29.57
11	Renz Rotteveel	6:32.36
12	Ted-Jan Bloemen	6:34.29
13	Simon Schouten	6:34.65
14	Jos de Vos	6:35.59
15	Christijn Groeneveld	6:36.02
16	Bart Mol	6:36.55
17	Arjan Stroetinga	6:38.87
18	Willem Hut	6:39.72
19	Crispijn Ariëns	6:41.40
20	Bob de Vries	6:44.33

=== Draw ===
Heat	Inside lane	Outside lane
1	Crispijn Ariëns	Willem Hut
2	Simon Schouten	Arjen van der Kieft
3	Jos de Vos	Frank Vreugdenhil
4	Bart Mol	Arjan Stroetinga
5	Rob Hadders	Bob de Vries
6	Renz Rotteveel	Robert Bovenhuis
7	Koen Verweij	Ted-Jan Bloemen
8	Christijn Groeneveld	Douwe de Vries
9	Sven Kramer	Jan Blokhuijsen
10	Bob de Jong	Jorrit Bergsma
