= Dmitriy Babenko =

Kazakhstani speed skater (born 1985)

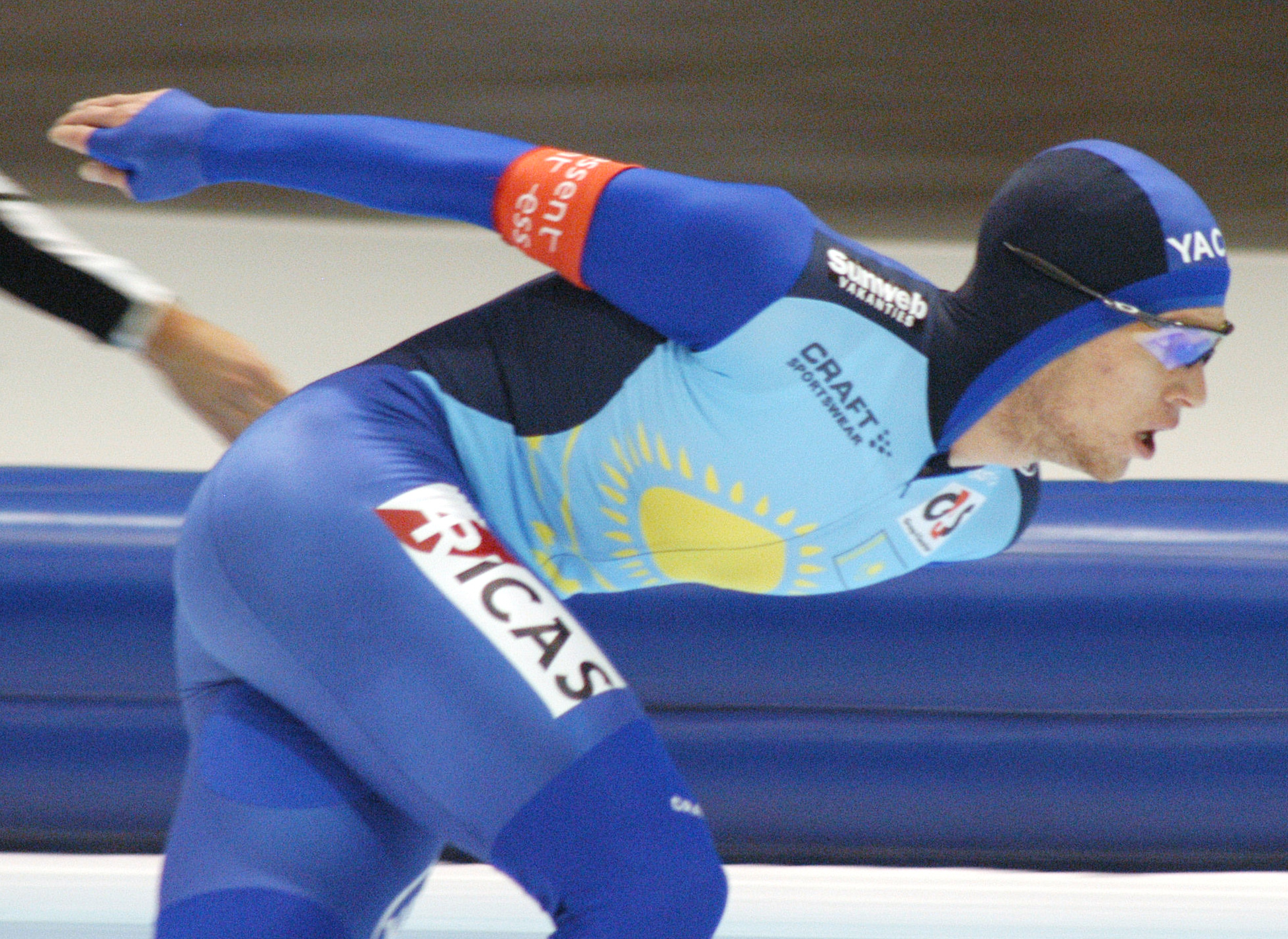
- Dmitriy Babenko (2007)

Personal information
- Born: 22 March 1985 (age 41) Almaty, Kazakh SSR, Soviet Union
- Height: 1.80 m (5 ft 11 in)
- Weight: 80 kg (176 lb)

Sport
- Country: Kazakhstan
- Sport: Speed skating

Achievements and titles
- Highest world ranking: 10 (mass start)

Dmitriy Aleksandrovich Babenko (Kazakh: Дмитрий Александрович Бабенко; born 22 March 1985) is a Kazakhstani speed skater.

Babenko competed at the 2006, 2010 and 2014 Winter Olympics for Kazakhstan. In 2006, he finished 23rd in the 5000 metres. In 2010, he again competed in the 5000 metres, finishing 15th. In 2014, he entered three events: In the 1500 metres he finished 30th overall, in the 5000 metres he was 15th and in the 10000 metres he finished 12th.

As of September 2014, Babenko's best performance at the World Single Distance Speed Skating Championships is 6th, in the 2011 10000m. His best performance at the World Allround Speed Skating Championships is 13th, in 2014.

Babenko made his World Cup debut in February 2004. As of September 2014, Babenko's top World Cup finish is 4th in a mass start race at Heerenveen in 2011–12. His best overall finish in the World Cup is 10th, in the mass start in 2011–12.
