= Speed skating at the 2014 Winter Olympics – Men's 1500 metres =

Men's 1500 metres at the XXII Olympic Winter Games
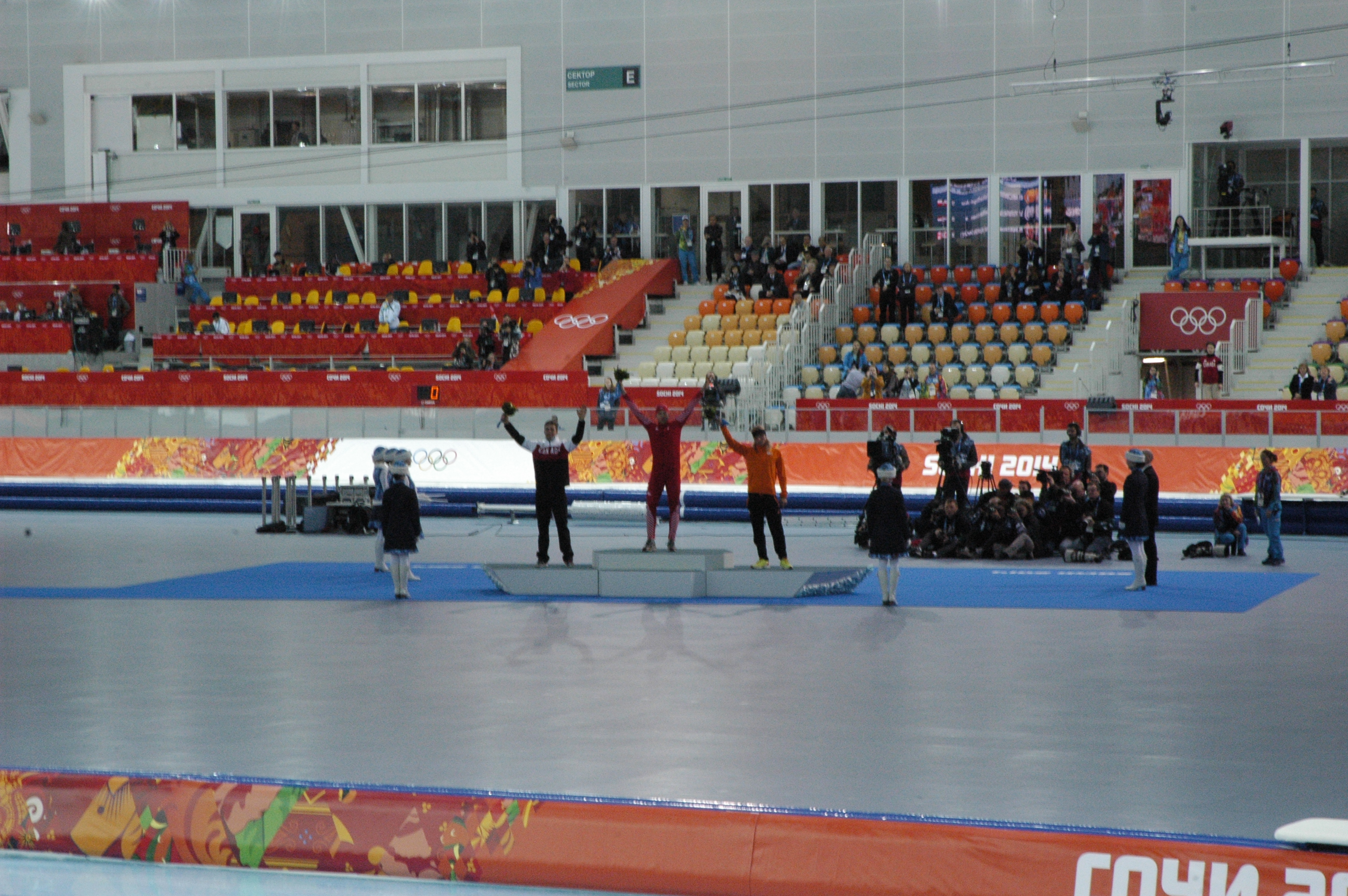
- Podium
- Venue: Adler Arena Skating Center
- Date: 15 February 2014
- Competitors: 40 from 18 nations
- Winning time: 1:45.00

Medalists
1st place, gold medalist(s)		Zbigniew Bródka	Poland
2nd place, silver medalist(s)		Koen Verweij	Netherlands
3rd place, bronze medalist(s)		Denny Morrison	Canada

The men's 1500 metres speed skating competition of the 2014 Winter Olympics was held at Adler Arena Skating Center on 15 February 2014.

The 2010 Olympic champion, Mark Tuitert of the Netherlands, sought to defend his title; he bettered the track record, but eventually finished fifth. Poland's Zbigniew Bródka won the gold medal, the Netherlands' Koen Verweij took silver, and Canada's Denny Morrison took the bronze. After Verweij's race in the last pair of the event, it took about half a minute before it was announced that Bródka had beaten Verweij's time by 3 thousandths of a second, which is 4.1 cm, given the finishing speed of Verweij being 49.4 km/h. Measurements in thousandths were only introduced in speed skating after the 2010 Olympics, so this was the closest win in Olympic speed skating history. Two comparably narrow victories had previously been recorded at the Olympics overall. At the 1998 Winter Olympics, Silke Kraushaar beat her teammate Barbara Niedernhuber by 0.002 seconds in the Women's luge event, while at the 1972 Summer Olympics Karl Gunnar Larsson beat Tim McKee by 0.002 seconds in the 400 meters individual swimming medley. The latter narrow win in effect brought about a change so that no swimming competition henceforward would have to be decided by a margin less than a hundredth of a second.

The gold medal awarded in this event featured a Chelyabinsk meteor fragment to commemorate the first anniversary of this meteor strike.

== Qualification ==
A total of forty speed skaters could qualify for this distance, with a maximum of four skaters per country. The top 20 of the men's 1500 metres World Cup standings after World Cup 4 in Berlin secured a spot for their country. Then the additional 20 spots were awarded based on a time ranking of all times skated in the World Cup. A reserve list was also made.

== Competition schedule ==
All times are (UTC+4).

Date	Time	Event
15 February	17:30	Men's 1500m

== Records ==
Prior to this competition, the existing world and Olympic records were as follows.

World record	Shani Davis (USA)	1:41.04	Salt Lake City, United States	11 December 2009
Olympic record	Derek Parra (USA)	1:43.95	Salt Lake City, United States	19 February 2002

At the 2013 World Single Distance Speed Skating Championships the track record was set by Denis Yuskov at 1:46,32. At the 2013–14 Russian Single Distance Championships Yuskov improved this track record skating 1:45.85.

The following records were set during this competition.

Date	Round	Athlete	Country	Time	Record
15 February	Pair 17	Zbigniew Bródka	Poland	1:45.00	TR
15 February	Pair 15	Denny Morrison	Canada	1:45.22	TR
15 February	Pair 13	Mark Tuitert	Netherlands	1:45.42	TR

TR = track record

== Results ==
The races were started at 17:30.

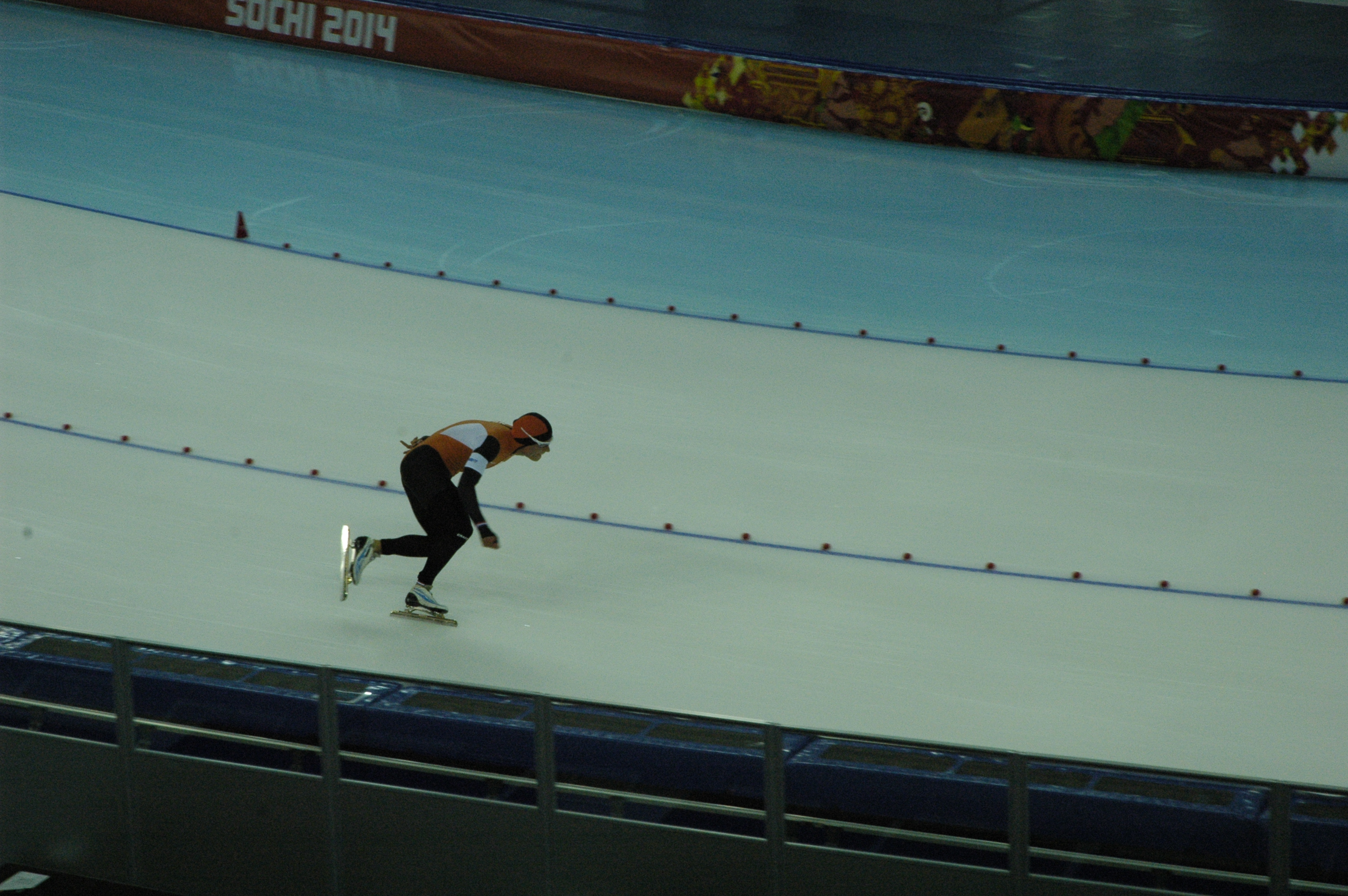
Silver medalist Koen Verweij

Rank	Pair	Lane	Name	Country	Time	Time Behind	Notes
1st place, gold medalist(s)	17	O	Zbigniew Bródka	Poland	1:45.006	—	TR
2nd place, silver medalist(s)	20	I	Koen Verweij	Netherlands	1:45.009	+0.003	
3rd place, bronze medalist(s)	15	O	Denny Morrison	Canada	1:45.22	+0.22	TR
4	19	I	Denis Yuskov	Russia	1:45.37	+0.37	
5	13	O	Mark Tuitert	Netherlands	1:45.42	+0.42	TR
6	15	I	Håvard Bøkko	Norway	1:45.48	+0.48	
7	16	I	Brian Hansen	United States	1:45.59	+0.59	
8	19	O	Sverre Lunde Pedersen	Norway	1:45.66	+0.66	
9	18	O	Denis Kuzin	Kazakhstan	1:45.69	+0.69	
10	14	O	Bart Swings	Belgium	1:45.95	+0.95	
11	17	I	Shani Davis	United States	1:45.98	+0.98	
12	7	O	Stefan Groothuis	Netherlands	1:46.08	+1.08	
13	2	I	Jan Blokhuijsen	Netherlands	1:46.50	+1.50	
14	13	I	Haralds Silovs	Latvia	1:46.79	+1.79	
15	12	I	Jan Szymański	Poland	1:46.86	+1.86	
16	16	O	Håvard Holmefjord Lorentzen	Norway	1:47.27	+2.27	
17	2	O	Mirko Giacomo Nenzi	Italy	1:47.48	+2.48	
18	14	I	Ivan Skobrev	Russia	1:47.62	+2.62	
19	12	O	Mathieu Giroux	Canada	1:47.65	+2.65	
20	18	I	Konrad Niedźwiedzki	Poland	1:47.77	+2.77	
21	4	O	Tian Guojun	China	1:47.95	+2.95	
22	20	O	Joey Mantia	United States	1:48.01	+3.01	
23	11	I	Patrick Beckert	Germany	1:48.08	+3.08	
24	11	O	Aleksey Yesin	Russia	1:48.10	+3.10	
25	9	I	Aleksey Suvorov	Russia	1:48.11	+3.11	
26	8	I	Konrád Nagy	Hungary	1:48.12	+3.12	
27	8	O	Robert Lehmann	Germany	1:48.24	+3.24	
28	3	O	Lucas Makowsky	Canada	1:48.51	+3.51	
29	4	I	Joo Hyong-jun	South Korea	1:48.59	+3.59	
30	10	O	Dmitry Babenko	Kazakhstan	1:48.67	+3.67	
31	3	I	Taro Kondo	Japan	1:49.31	+4.31	
32	10	I	Benjamin Macé	France	1:49.34	+4.34	
33	1	O	Vincent De Haître	Canada	1:49.42	+4.42	
34	7	I	Aleksandr Zhigin	Kazakhstan	1:49.48	+4.48	
35	5	O	Fyodor Mezentsev	Kazakhstan	1:49.70	+4.70	
36	5	I	Simen Spieler Nilsen	Norway	1:49.88	+4.88	
37	9	O	Jonathan Kuck	United States	1:50.19	+5.19	
38	1	I	David Andersson	Sweden	1:50.30	+5.29	
39	6	O	Matteo Anesi	Italy	1:50.59	+5.59	
40	6	I	Ewen Fernandez	France	1:52.70	+7.70	

TR = track record
