= Aleksey Suvorov =

Russian speed skater

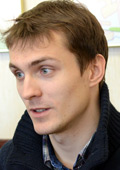

Personal information
- Born: 17 September 1991 (age 34) Chelyabinsk, Russian SSR, Soviet Union
- Height: 5 ft 11 in (180 cm)
- Weight: 176 lb (80 kg)

Sport
- Country: Russia
- Sport: Speed skating

Achievements and titles
- Highest world ranking: 37 (500m)

Aleksey Suvorov (born 17 September 1991 in Chelyabinsk) is a Russian speed-skater.

Suvorov competed at the 2014 Winter Olympics for Russia. In the 1500 metres he finished 25th.

Suvorov made his World Cup debut in November 2011. As of September 2014, Suvorov's top World Cup finish is 18th, in a pair of 1500m races in 2013–14. His best overall finish in the World Cup is 29th, in the 2013–14 1500m.
