= Ewen Fernandez =

French speed skater (born 1989)

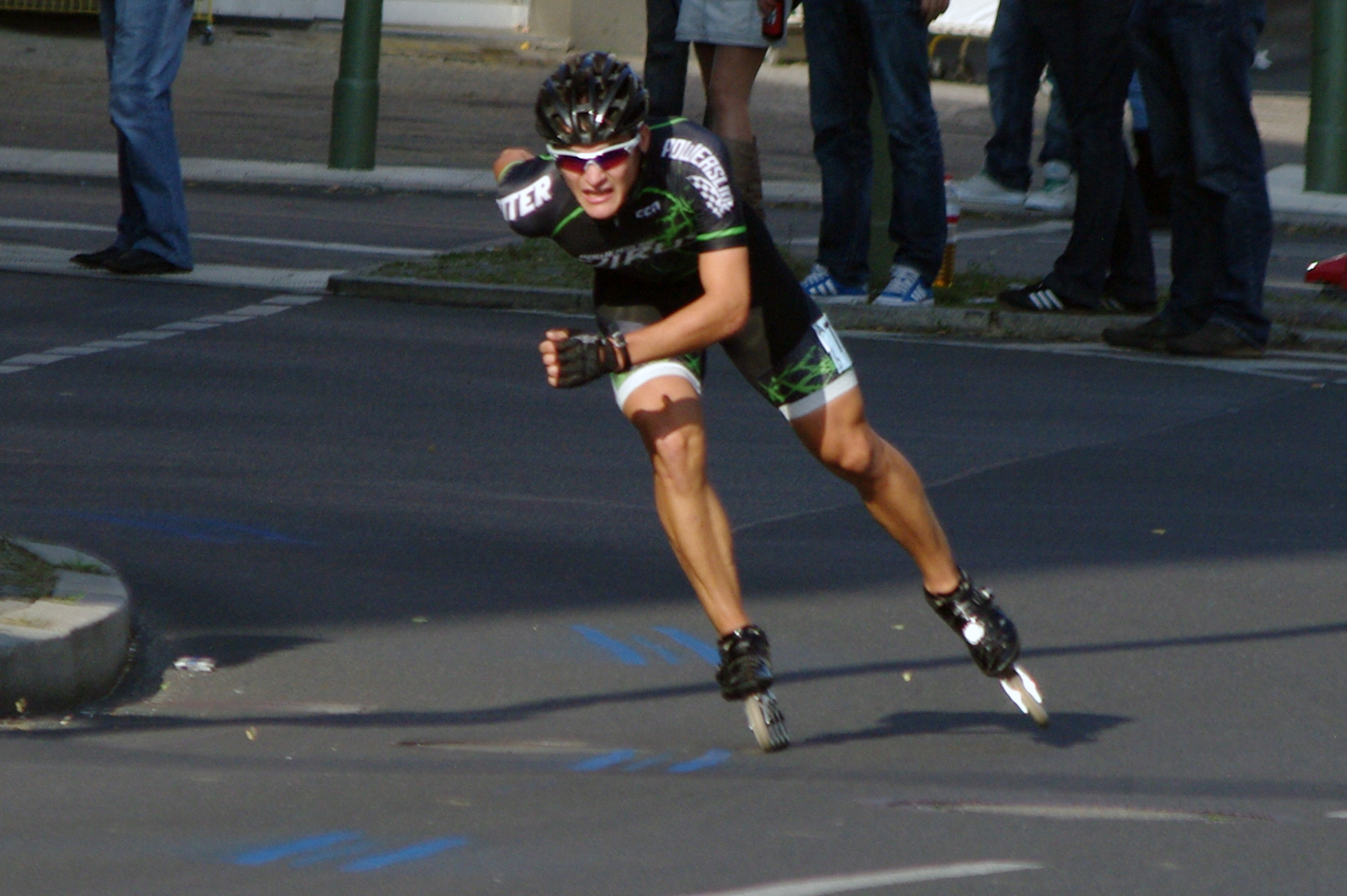
- Ewen Fernandez in 2011

Personal information
- Born: 17 February 1989 (age 37) Saint-Lô, France
- Height: 1.73 m (5 ft 8 in)
- Weight: 161 lb (73 kg)

Sport
- Country: France
- Sport: Speed skating

Achievements and titles
- Highest world ranking: 12 (Mass start)

Ewen Fernandez (born 17 February 1989) is a French speed skater.

Fernandez competed at the 2014 Winter Olympics for France. In the 1500 metres he finished 40th overall, and in the 5000 metres he was 18th. He was also a member of the French team pursuit squad, which lost its quarter-final to the Netherlands, and then lost Final D to the United States, finishing 8th.

As of September 2014, Fernandez's best performance at the World Single Distance Speed Skating Championships is 19th, in the 2012 5000 metres.

Fernandez made his World Cup debut in November 2011. As of September 2014, Fernandez has one World Cup podium finish, winning a silver medal in a mass start race at Kolomna in 2012–13. His best overall finish in the World Cup is 12th, in the mass start in 2012–13.

In 2017, he was the winner in Paris, Jeonju, Incheon, Frankfort and P2P.

== World Cup podiums ==
Date	Season	Location	Rank	Event
25 November 2012	2012–13	Kolomna	2nd place, silver medalist(s)	Mass start
