= Camilla Farestveit =

Norwegian speed skater

Camilla Helene Hallås Farestveit (born 5 December 1989) is a Norwegian speed skater. She competed for the Norwegian team in the women's team pursuit at the 2014 Winter Olympics. Farestveit was born in Bergen.
