= 2015 World Allround Speed Skating Championships =

International speed skating competition

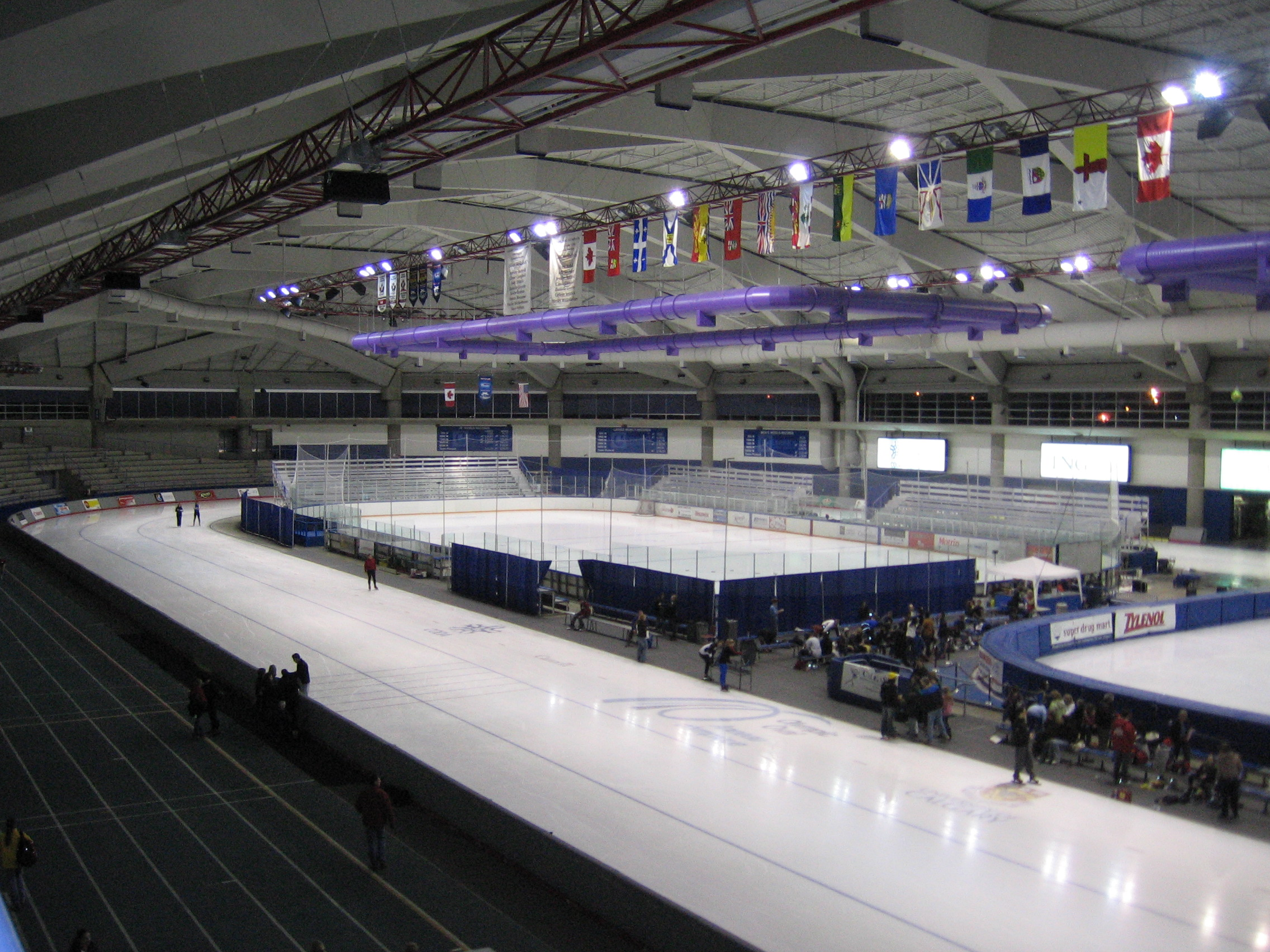
- Location: Calgary, Alberta, Canada
- Venue: Olympic Oval
- Dates: 7–8 March
- Competitors: 48 from 18 nations

Medalist men
| 1st place, gold medalist(s) | | Sven Kramer | NED |
| 2nd place, silver medalist(s) | | Denis Yuskov | RUS |
| 3rd place, bronze medalist(s) | | Sverre Lunde Pedersen | NOR |

Medalist women
| 1st place, gold medalist(s) | | Martina Sáblíková | CZE |
| 2nd place, silver medalist(s) | | Ireen Wüst | NED |
| 3rd place, bronze medalist(s) | | Ida Njåtun | NOR |

The 2015 World Allround Speed Skating Championships were held in Calgary, Alberta, Canada, from 7 to 8 March 2015.

== Schedule ==
| Date | Event |
|---|---|
| 7 March | Women's 500 m |
| 7 March | Men's 500 m |
| 7 March | Women's 3000 m |
| 7 March | Men's 5000 m |
| 8 March | Women's 1500 m |
| 8 March | Men's 1500 m |
| 8 March | Women's 5000 m |
| 8 March | Men's 10000 m |

== Participating nations ==
48 speed skaters (24 men, 24 women) from 18 nations participated. The number of speed skaters per nation that competed is shown in parentheses.

Participating nations
Click on a nation to go to the nations' 2015 Championships page
- Austria (1)
- Belarus (1)
- Belgium (1)
- Canada (4)
- China (3)
- Czech Republic (1)
- France (1)
- Germany (3)
- Hungary (1)
- Italy (2)
- Japan (4)
- Latvia (1)
- Netherlands (6)
- Norway (5)
- Poland (4)
- Russia (6)
- South Korea (3)
- United States (1)

== Medal summary ==
=== Medal table ===
| Rank | Nation | Gold | Silver | Bronze | Total |
|---|---|---|---|---|---|
| 1 | Netherlands (NED) | 1 | 1 | 0 | 2 |
| 2 | Czech Republic (CZE) | 1 | 0 | 0 | 1 |
| 3 | Russia (RUS) | 0 | 1 | 0 | 1 |
| 4 | Norway (NOR) | 0 | 0 | 2 | 2 |
| Totals (4 entries) | | 2 | 2 | 2 | 6 |

=== Medalists ===
| Event | Gold | | Silver | | Bronze | |
|---|---|---|---|---|---|---|
| Men | Sven Kramer; NED | 146.509 | Denis Yuskov; RUS | 146.934 | Sverre Lunde Pedersen; NOR | 147.182 |
| Women | Martina Sáblíková; CZE | 157.717 | Ireen Wüst; NED | 159.278 | Ida Njåtun; NOR | 159.795 |
