= David Andersson (speed skater) =

Swedish speed skater

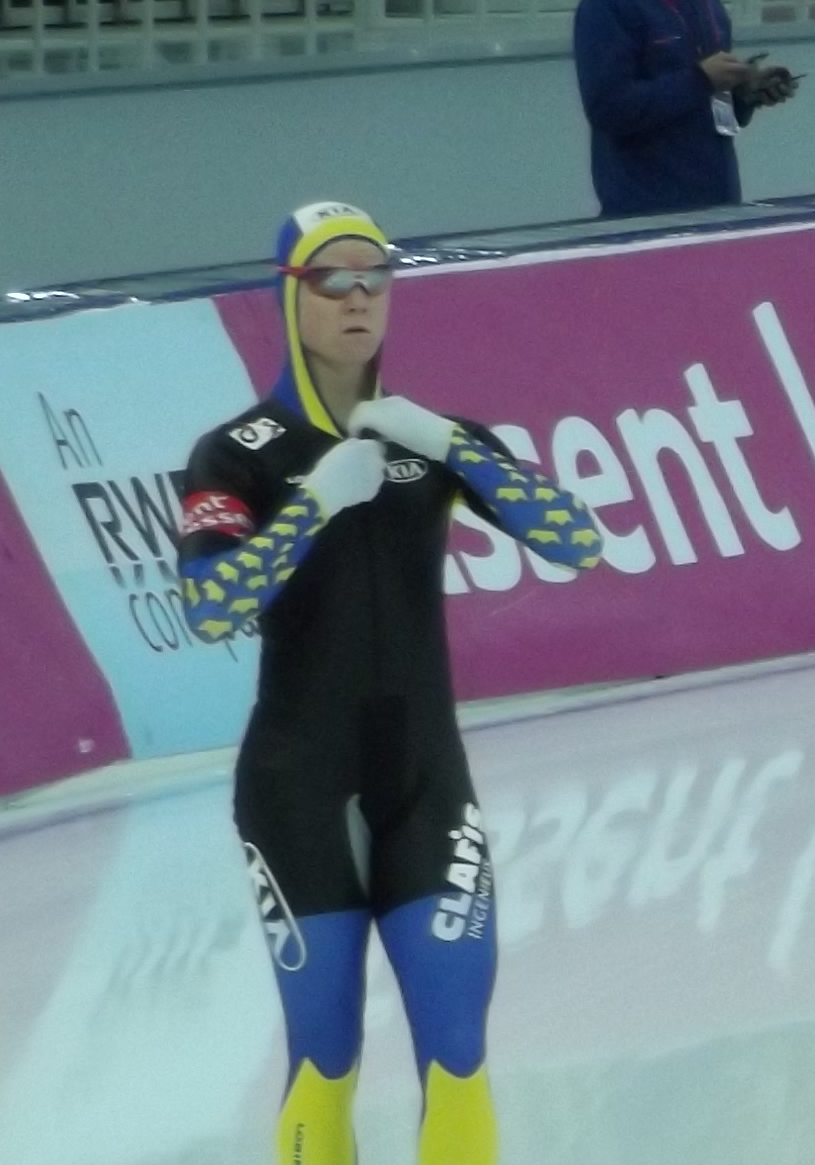
- 2013 World Single Distance Speed Skating Championships

Personal information
- Born: 23 February 1994 (age 32) Vänersnäs, Vänersborg, Sweden
- Height: 6 ft 0 in (183 cm)
- Weight: 172 lb (78 kg)

Sport
- Country: Sweden
- Sport: Speed skating

Achievements and titles
- Highest world ranking: 37 (1500 m)

David Andersson (born 23 February 1994) is a Swedish speed skater.

Andersson competed at the 2014 Winter Olympics for Sweden. In the 1000 metres and the 1500 metres he finished 38th overall.

As of September 2014, Andersson's best performance at the World Single Distance Championships is 23rd, in the 2013 1500 metres.

Andersson made his World Cup debut in November 2012. As of September 2014, Andersson's top World Cup finish is 4th in a 1500m B race at Kolomna in 2012–13. His best overall finish in the World Cup is 37th, in the 1500 metres in 2012–13.
