= Luca Stefani =

Italian speed skater

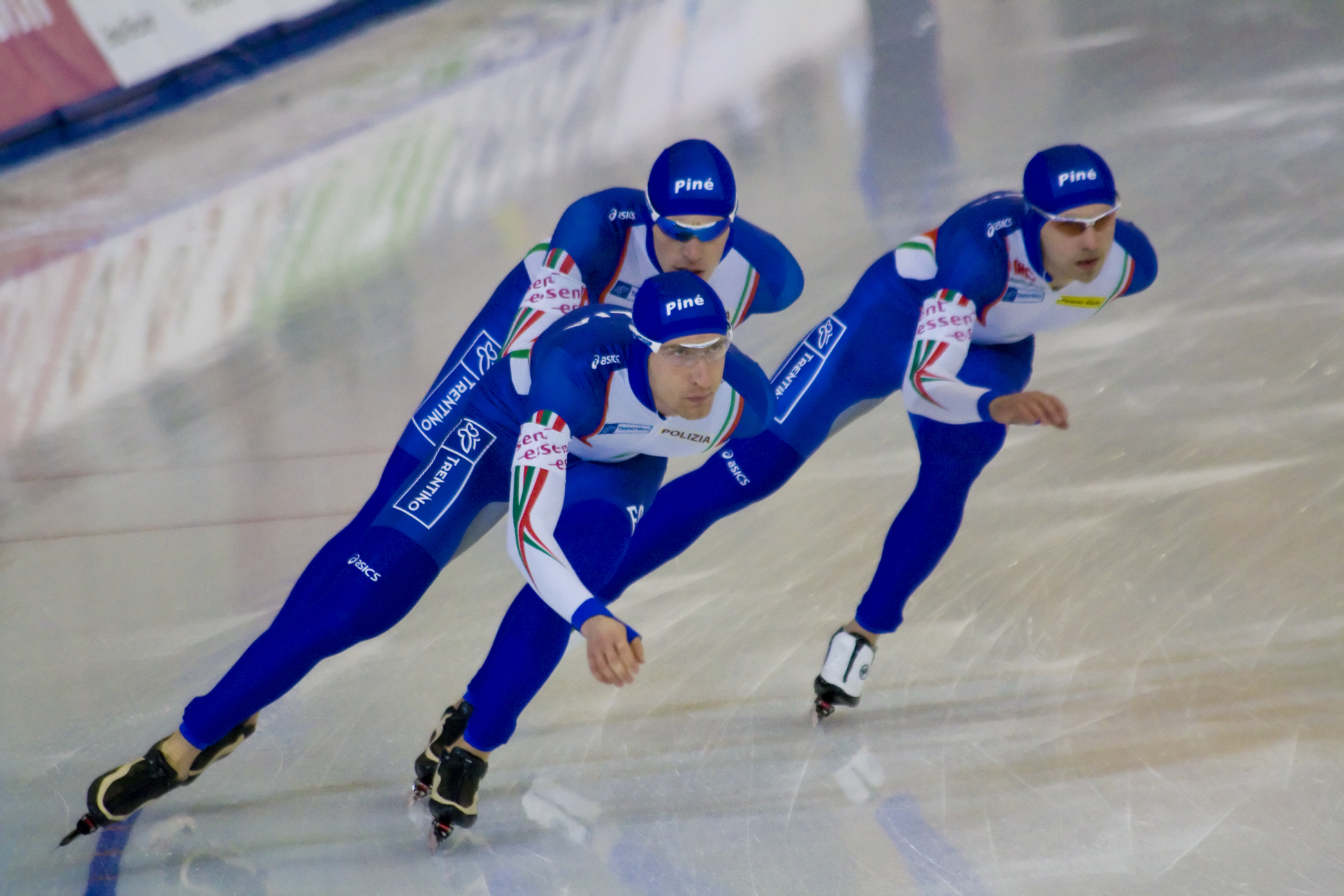
- Stefani with Enrico Fabris and Matteo Anesi in 2009

Personal information
- Born: 22 February 1987 (age 39) Asiago, Italy
- Height: 1.93 m (6 ft 4 in)
- Weight: 90 kg (198 lb)

Sport
- Country: Italy
- Sport: Speed skating
- Club: Fiamme Oro

Luca Stefani (born 22 February 1987) is an Italian long track speed skater who participates in international competitions.

== Personal records ==
Personal records
Men's Speed skating
Event	Result	Date	Location	Notes
500 m	37.11	2008-01-12	Kolomna	
1,000 m	1:13.92	2007-02-25	Baselga di Pinè	
1,500 m	1:48.20	2007-03-11	Salt Lake City	
3,000 m	3:51.46	2007-02-11	Collalbo	
5,000 m	6:31.36	2007-11-10	Salt Lake City	
10,000 m	14:08.67	2006-11-26	Moscow	

=== Career highlights ===
European Allround Championships
2008 - Kolomna, 16th
World Junior Allround Championships
2004 - Roseville, Minnesota, 39th
2005 - Seinäjoki, 30th
2006 - Erfurt, 12th
National Championships
2007 - Baselga di Pinè, (bronze) 3rd at allround
2008 - Baselga di Pinè, (bronze) 3rd at allround
European Junior Games
2006 - Collalbo, (bronze) 3rd at 3000 m
