= Jelena Peeters =

Belgian speed skater

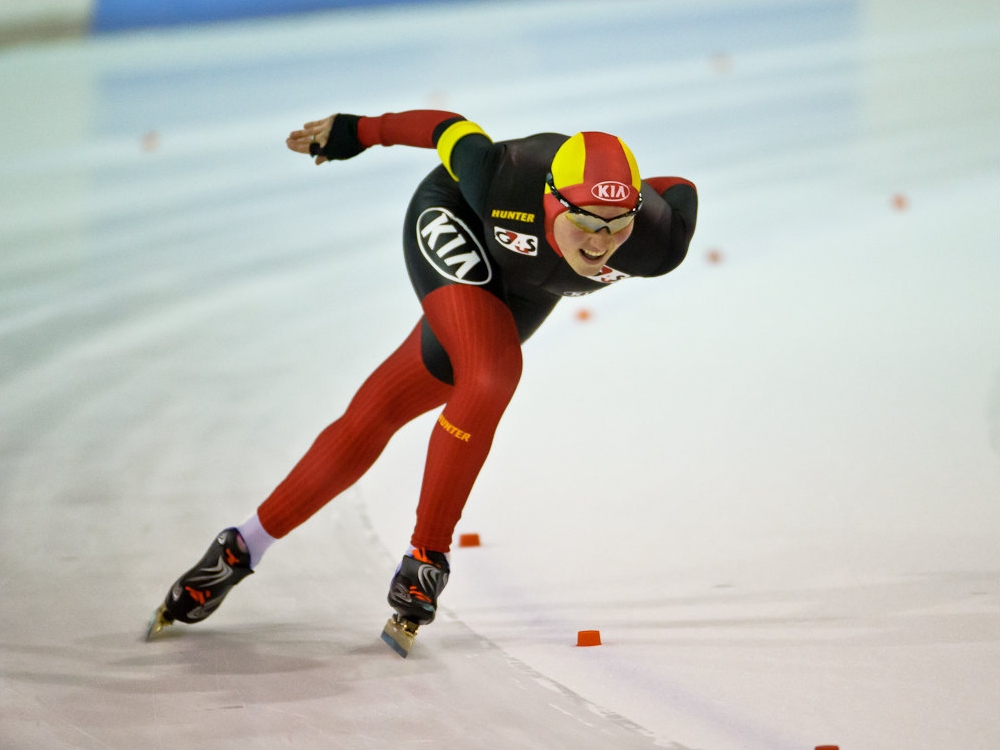
- Peeters in 2012

Personal information
- Born: 19 December 1985 (age 40) Turnhout, Belgium
- Height: 1.68 m (5 ft 6 in) (2018)
- Weight: 65 kg (143 lb) (2018)

Sport
- Country: Belgium
- Sport: Speed skating

Jelena Peeters (born 19 December 1985 in Turnhout) is a Belgian speed skater. She was born in Turnhout. She competed at the 2014 Winter Olympics in Sochi, where she placed 12th in 3000 meters and 20th in 1500 meters.

Peeters is the current Belgian record holder in three distances: 1500, 3000 and 5000 metres.

== Speed skating ==
=== Personal records ===
Personal records
Women's speed skating
Event	Result	Date	Location	Notes
500 m	40.60	6 January 2018	Max Aicher Arena, Inzell	Belgian record until beaten by Stien Vanhoutte on 16 February 2019.
1000 m	1:18.42	6 January 2018	Max Aicher Arena, Inzell	Belgian record until beaten by Sandrine Tas on 2 October 2021.
1500 m	1:56.99	3 December 2017	Olympic Oval, Calgary	Current Belgian record.
3000 m	4:04.00	15 November 2013	Utah Olympic Oval, Salt Lake City	Current Belgian record.
5000 m	7:03.69	20 November 2015	Utah Olympic Oval, Salt Lake City	Current Belgian record.
