= 2013–14 ISU Speed Skating World Cup – Women's 500 metres =

The 500 meters distance for women in the 2013–14 ISU Speed Skating World Cup was contested over 12 races on six occasions, out of a total of six World Cup occasions for the season, with the first occasion taking place in Calgary, Alberta, Canada, on 8–10 November 2013, and the final occasion taking place in Heerenveen, Netherlands, on 14–16 March 2014.

The defending champion was Lee Sang-hwa of South Korea.

On 9 November, in the second race in Calgary, Lee improved her own world record with a time of 36.74 seconds. Six days later, in the first race in Salt Lake City, she improved the record a further 17/100, to 36.57 seconds. Amazingly, the next day, for the third time within a week, she again broke the world record, this time with a time of 36.36 seconds.

Lee won the first seven races, but did not to participate in the rest of the races. This allowed for three other skaters to pass her in aggregate points. Instead, Olga Fatkulina of Russia won the cup, while Heather Richardson of the United States came second, and Jenny Wolf of Germany came third. Lee ended up in fourth place.

== Top three ==
Position	Athlete	Points	Previous season
1	(Russia) Olga Fatkulina	960	4th
2	(United States) Heather Richardson	915	5th
3	(Germany) Jenny Wolf	803	2nd

== Race medallists ==
Occasion #	Location	Date	Gold	Time	Silver	Time	Bronze	Time	Report
1	Calgary, Alberta, Canada	8 November	Lee Sang-hwa; South Korea	36.91	Jenny Wolf; Germany	37.14	Wang Beixing; China	37.40	
1	Calgary, Alberta, Canada	9 November	Lee Sang-hwa; South Korea	36.74; WR	Jenny Wolf; Germany	37.18	Wang Beixing; China	37.30	
2	Salt Lake City, United States	15 November	Lee Sang-hwa; South Korea	36.57; WR	Wang Beixing; China	36.85	Heather Richardson; United States	36.97	
2	Salt Lake City, United States	16 November	Lee Sang-hwa; South Korea	36.36; WR	Heather Richardson; United States	36.90	Olga Fatkulina; Russia	37.13	
3	Astana, Kazakhstan	29 November	Lee Sang-hwa; South Korea	37.27	Jenny Wolf; Germany	37.70	Nao Kodaira; Japan	37.72	
3	Astana, Kazakhstan	30 November	Lee Sang-hwa; South Korea	37.32	Jenny Wolf; Germany	37.66	Olga Fatkulina; Russia	37.81	
4	Berlin, Germany	6 December	Lee Sang-hwa; South Korea	37.36	Olga Fatkulina; Russia	37.71	Wang Beixing; China	37.79	
4	Berlin, Germany	7 December	Olga Fatkulina; Russia	37.92	Wang Beixing; China	37.96	Heather Richardson; United States	38.00	
5	Inzell, Germany	7 March	Heather Richardson; United States	37.85	Judith Hesse; Germany	37.86	Olga Fatkulina; Russia	37.89	
5	Inzell, Germany	8 March	Heather Richardson; United States	37.70	Olga Fatkulina; Russia	37.84	Jenny Wolf; Germany	37.89	
6	Heerenveen, Netherlands	15 March	Olga Fatkulina; Russia	37.67	Heather Richardson; United States	37.79	Nao Kodaira; Japan	37.95	
6	Heerenveen, Netherlands	16 March	Olga Fatkulina; Russia	37.86	Jenny Wolf; Germany	38.00	Heather Richardson; United States	38.04	

== Standings ==
Standings as of 16 March 2014 (end of the season).

#	Name	Nat.	CAL1	CAL2	SLC1	SLC2	AST1	AST2	BER1	BER2	INZ1	INZ2	HVN1	HVN2	Total
1	Olga Fatkulina	(Russia)	45	45	50	70	50	70	80	100	70	80	150	150	960
2	Heather Richardson	(United States)	50	50	70	80	60	50	60	70	100	100	120	105	915
3	Jenny Wolf	(Germany)	80	80	60	28	80	80	5	60	50	70	90	120	803
4	Lee Sang-hwa	(South Korea)	100	100	100	100	100	100	100						700
5	Nao Kodaira	(Japan)	60	36	40	21	70		50	45	60	60	105	90	637
6	Margot Boer	(Netherlands)	40	60	45	45			36	36	45	36	75	75	493
7	Wang Beixing	(China)	70	70	80	60			70	80					430
8	Thijsje Oenema	(Netherlands)	10	18	14	16	45	60	45	50	32	50	21	40	401
9	Judith Hesse	(Germany)	36	32	32	40			8	32	80	40	36	24	360
10	Miyako Sumiyoshi	(Japan)	21	21	24	14	14	28	24	40	24	28	40	36	314
11	Brittany Bowe	(United States)	32	28	36	32	28	24	40		36		28	28	312
12	Laurine van Riessen	(Netherlands)	12	12	11	15	40	32			40	45	45	45	297
13	Maki Tsuji	(Japan)	28	24	12	12	32	45	28	28	21	24	18	21	293
14	Karolína Erbanová	(Czech Republic)	8	5	8	19	18	10	10	16	28	32	32	32	218
15	Anice Das	(Netherlands)	11	25	10	6	8	12	32	18	18	21	24	10	195
16	Erina Kamiya	(Japan)	16	16	16	24	16	18	21	14	3	6	14	14	178
17	Yekaterina Aydova	(Russia)	14	14	18	5	36	40	14	21					162
18	Yu Jing	(China)	24	40	28	50									142
19	Lauren Cholewinski	(United States)	19	11	21	18	21	21	18	6					135
20	Mayon Kuipers	(Netherlands)		19	8	10	10	8	19	25			12	18	129
21	Jennifer Plate	(Germany)		4	15	25	6	6	15	19	5	8	10	12	125
22	Kaylin Irvine	(Canada)					19	19	12	8	14	18	16	16	122
23	Yekaterina Malysheva	(Russia)	2		19	11	24	36							92
24	Lee Bo-ra	(South Korea)		6	6		25	14	16	24					91
25	Elli Ochowicz	(United States)	15	15	5	4	12	16	6	12					85
26	Denise Roth	(Germany)		2		1	4	8	11	15	16	12			69
27	Zhang Hong	(China)	5		25	36									66
28	Yuliya Liteykina	(Russia)	25	10	6	8	5	5		1					60
29	Annette Gerritsen	(Netherlands)						25			10	16			51
30	Sugar Todd	(United States)					11	11		6	6	14			48
31	Vanessa Bittner	(Austria)				2			25	10					37
32	Kim Hyun-yung	(South Korea)	6	8	1	6		15							36
33	Yekaterina Shikhova	(Russia)	8				15				12				35
34	Christine Nesbitt	(Canada)	18	8	4										30
35	Marsha Hudey	(Canada)	6	6		8			4	2					26
36	Yuliya Skokova	(Russia)					6		8		8				22
37	Marrit Leenstra	(Netherlands)							6	11					17
38	Angelina Golikova	(Russia)									4	10			14
39	Reika Shimizu	(Japan)					8	6							14
40	Zhang Shuang	(China)					2	2		8					12
41	Qi Shuai	(China)	1					1	1	4					7
42	Elina Risku	(Finland)									2	4			6
42	Yekaterina Lobysheva	(Russia)	4						2						6
42	Park Seung-ju	(South Korea)		1			1	4							6
45	Kelly Gunther	(United States)										5			5
46	Shannon Rempel	(Canada)				4									4
47	Yvonne Daldossi	(Italy)									1	3			4
48	Katja Franzen	(Germany)										2			2
48	Danielle Wotherspoon-Gregg	(Canada)			2										2
