= 2013–14 ISU Speed Skating World Cup – World Cup 1 – Women's 500 metres =

The women's 500 metres races of the 2013–14 ISU Speed Skating World Cup 1, arranged in the Olympic Oval, in Calgary, Alberta, Canada, were held on 8 and 9 November 2013.

The podium placings of both races were identical – Lee Sang-hwa of South Korea won, followed by Jenny Wolf of Germany and Wang Beixing of China. In race two, Lee set a new world record with a time of 36.74 seconds. Yuliya Liteykina of Russia won Division B of race one, which promoted her to Division A of race two. Anice Dac of the Netherlands won Division B of race two.

== Race 1 ==
Race one took place on Friday, 8 November, with Division A scheduled in the morning session, at 11:00, and Division B scheduled in the afternoon session, at 15:49.

=== Division A ===
| Rank | Name | Nat. | Pair | Lane | Time | WC points | GWC points |
|---|---|---|---|---|---|---|---|
| 1st place, gold medalist(s) | Lee Sang-hwa | (South Korea) | 9 | i | 36.91 | 100 | 5 |
| 2nd place, silver medalist(s) | Jenny Wolf | (Germany) | 10 | i | 37.14 | 80 | 4 |
| 3rd place, bronze medalist(s) | Wang Beixing | (China) | 6 | i | 37.40 | 70 | 3.5 |
| 4 | Nao Kodaira | (Japan) | 8 | i | 37.56 | 60 | 3 |
| 5 | Heather Richardson | (United States) | 4 | i | 37.61 | 50 | 2.5 |
| 6 | Olga Fatkulina | (Russia) | 9 | o | 37.63 | 45 | — |
| 7 | Margot Boer | (Netherlands) | 7 | o | 37.64 | 40 | |
| 8 | Judith Hesse | (Germany) | 2 | i | 37.68 | 36 | |
| 9 | Brittany Bowe | (United States) | 8 | o | 37.69 | 32 | |
| 10 | Maki Tsuji | (Japan) | 3 | i | 37.80 | 28 | |
| 11 | Yu Jing | (China) | 10 | o | 37.88 | 24 | |
| 12 | Miyako Sumiyoshi | (Japan) | 1 | o | 37.92 | 21 | |
| 13 | Christine Nesbitt | (Canada) | 3 | o | 37.94 | 18 | |
| 14 | Erina Kamiya | (Japan) | 6 | o | 38.016 | 16 | |
| 15 | Yekaterina Aydova | (Russia) | 2 | o | 38.018 | 14 | |
| 16 | Laurine van Riessen | (Netherlands) | 5 | i | 38.15 | 12 | |
| 17 | Thijsje Oenema | (Netherlands) | 7 | i | 38.17 | 10 | |
| 18 | Karolína Erbanová | (Czech Republic) | 4 | o | 38.39 | 8 | |
| 19 | Marsha Hudey | (Canada) | 1 | i | 39.02 | 6 | |
| 20 | Zhang Hong | (China) | 5 | o | 1:12.65 | 5 | |

=== Division B ===
| Rank | Name | Nat. | Pair | Lane | Time | WC points |
|---|---|---|---|---|---|---|
| 1 | Yuliya Liteykina | (Russia) | 6 | i | 37.74 | 25 |
| 2 | Lauren Cholewinski | (United States) | 14 | o | 38.06 | 19 |
| 3 | Elli Ochowicz | (United States) | 8 | o | 38.09 | 15 |
| 4 | Anice Das | (Netherlands) | 16 | i | 38.14 | 11 |
| 5 | Yekaterina Shikhova | (Russia) | 10 | o | 38.29 | 8 |
| 6 | Kim Hyun-yung | (South Korea) | 7 | i | 38.33 | 6 |
| 7 | Yekaterina Lobysheva | (Russia) | 15 | i | 38.350 | 4 |
| 8 | Yekaterina Malysheva | (Russia) | 13 | i | 38.357 | 2 |
| 9 | Qi Shuai | (China) | 11 | o | 38.36 | 1 |
| 10 | Lee Bo-ra | (South Korea) | 9 | i | 38.37 | — |
| 11 | Shannon Rempel | (Canada) | 4 | o | 38.470 | |
| 12 | Jennifer Plate | (Germany) | 15 | o | 38.477 | |
| 13 | Park Seung-ju | (South Korea) | 3 | i | 38.54 | |
| 14 | Mayon Kuipers | (Netherlands) | 16 | o | 38.57 | |
| 15 | Kaylin Irvine | (Canada) | 11 | i | 38.583 | |
| 16 | Reika Shimizu | (Japan) | 12 | o | 38.584 | |
| 17 | Vanessa Bittner | (Austria) | 8 | i | 38.64 | |
| 18 | Denise Roth | (Germany) | 2 | o | 38.74 | |
| 19 | Zhang Shuang | (China) | 12 | i | 38.76 | |
| 20 | Monique Angermüller | (Germany) | 13 | o | 38.82 | |
| 21 | Yvonne Daldossi | (Italy) | 5 | o | 38.93 | |
| 22 | Sugar Todd | (United States) | 9 | o | 39.00 | |
| 23 | Danielle Wotherspoon-Gregg | (Canada) | 14 | i | 39.02 | |
| 24 | Elina Risku | (Finland) | 5 | i | 39.24 | |
| 25 | Ágota Lykovcán | (Hungary) | 6 | o | 39.28 | |
| 26 | Paola Simionato | (Italy) | 10 | i | 39.49 | |
| 27 | Kaitlyn McGregor | (Switzerland) | 4 | i | 39.62 | |
| 28 | Francesca Bettrone | (Italy) | 1 | i | 39.76 | |
| 29 | Ksenia Sadovskaya | (Belarus) | 7 | o | 39.87 | |
| 30 | Hege Bøkko | (Norway) | 2 | i | 39.93 | |
| 31 | Mariya Sizova | (Kazakhstan) | 3 | o | 40.66 | |

== Race 2 ==
Race two took place on Saturday, 9 November, with Division A scheduled in the morning session, at 11:00, and Division B scheduled in the afternoon session, at 15:30. Lee Sang-hwa improved her own world record with a time of 36.74 seconds.

=== Division A ===
| Rank | Name | Nat. | Pair | Lane | Time | WC points | GWC points |
|---|---|---|---|---|---|---|---|
| 1st place, gold medalist(s) | Lee Sang-hwa | (South Korea) | 10 | o | 36.74 | 100 | 5 |
| 2nd place, silver medalist(s) | Jenny Wolf | (Germany) | 9 | o | 37.18 | 80 | 4 |
| 3rd place, bronze medalist(s) | Wang Beixing | (China) | 8 | o | 37.30 | 70 | 3.5 |
| 4 | Margot Boer | (Netherlands) | 9 | i | 37.36 | 60 | 3 |
| 5 | Heather Richardson | (United States) | 6 | o | 37.44 | 50 | 2.5 |
| 6 | Olga Fatkulina | (Russia) | 10 | i | 37.52 | 45 | — |
| 7 | Yu Jing | (China) | 7 | i | 37.60 | 40 | |
| 8 | Nao Kodaira | (Japan) | 7 | o | 37.61 | 36 | |
| 9 | Judith Hesse | (Germany) | 5 | o | 37.65 | 32 | |
| 10 | Brittany Bowe | (United States) | 8 | i | 37.74 | 28 | |
| 11 | Maki Tsuji | (Japan) | 3 | o | 37.88 | 24 | |
| 12 | Miyako Sumiyoshi | (Japan) | 6 | i | 37.90 | 21 | |
| 13 | Thijsje Oenema | (Netherlands) | 1 | i | 37.96 | 18 | |
| 14 | Erina Kamiya | (Japan) | 4 | i | 38.00 | 16 | |
| 15 | Yekaterina Aydova | (Russia) | 3 | i | 38.16 | 14 | |
| 16 | Laurine van Riessen | (Netherlands) | 2 | o | 38.19 | 12 | |
| 17 | Yuliya Liteykina | (Russia) | 4 | o | 38.33 | 10 | |
| 18 | Christine Nesbitt | (Canada) | 5 | i | 38.39 | 8 | |
| 19 | Marsha Hudey | (Canada) | 1 | o | 38.44 | 6 | |
| 20 | Karolína Erbanová | (Czech Republic) | 2 | i | 38.45 | 5 | |

=== Division B ===
| Rank | Name | Nat. | Pair | Lane | Time | WC points |
|---|---|---|---|---|---|---|
| 1 | Anice Das | (Netherlands) | 14 | o | 37.89 | 25 |
| 2 | Mayon Kuipers | (Netherlands) | 9 | i | 37.97 | 19 |
| 3 | Elli Ochowicz | (United States) | 13 | i | 38.07 | 15 |
| 4 | Lauren Cholewinski | (United States) | 14 | i | 38.12 | 11 |
| 5 | Kim Hyun-yung | (South Korea) | 13 | o | 38.16 | 8 |
| 6 | Lee Bo-ra | (South Korea) | 11 | o | 38.24 | 6 |
| 7 | Jennifer Plate | (Germany) | 10 | i | 38.25 | 4 |
| 8 | Denise Roth | (Germany) | 7 | i | 38.50 | 2 |
| 9 | Park Seung-ju | (South Korea) | 10 | o | 38.51 | 1 |
| 10 | Vanessa Bittner | (Austria) | 8 | o | 38.53 | — |
| 11 | Kaylin Irvine | (Canada) | 9 | o | 38.579 | |
| 11 | Shannon Rempel | (Canada) | 11 | i | 38.579 | |
| 13 | Gabriele Hirschbichler | (Germany) | 2 | o | 38.622 | |
| 14 | Danielle Wotherspoon-Gregg | (Canada) | 6 | o | 38.629 | |
| 15 | Sugar Todd | (United States) | 5 | i | 38.63 | |
| 16 | Yekaterina Malysheva | (Russia) | 12 | o | 38.79 | |
| 17 | Nadezhda Aseyeva | (Russia) | 1 | i | 38.85 | |
| 18 | Qi Shuai | (China) | 12 | i | 38.90 | |
| 19 | Reika Shimizu | (Japan) | 8 | i | 38.95 | |
| 20 | Yvonne Daldossi | (Italy) | 6 | i | 38.96 | |
| 21 | Paola Simionato | (Italy) | 4 | o | 39.07 | |
| 22 | Ágota Lykovcán | (Hungary) | 4 | i | 39.17 | |
| 23 | Zhang Shuang | (China) | 7 | o | 39.19 | |
| 24 | Elina Risku | (Finland) | 5 | o | 39.30 | |
| 25 | Kaitlyn McGregor | (Switzerland) | 3 | o | 39.38 | |
| 26 | Ksenia Sadovskaya | (Belarus) | 3 | i | 39.93 | |
| 27 | Mariya Sizova | (Kazakhstan) | 2 | i | 40.82 | |
