= 2013–14 ISU Speed Skating World Cup – World Cup 2 – Women's 500 metres =

The women's 500 metres races of the 2013–14 ISU Speed Skating World Cup 2, arranged in the Utah Olympic Oval, in Salt Lake City, United States, were held on November 15 and 16, 2013.

Lee Sang-hwa of South Korea won both races, breaking the world record both times. Wang Beixing of China and Heather Richardson of the United States took the silver and bronze medals in race one, while Zhang Hong of China won the Division B race.

In race two, Richardson advanced one position, taking the silver medal behind Lee, while Olga Fatkulina of Russia took the bronze. Jennifer Plate of Germany won the second Division B race.

== Race 1 ==
Race one took place on Friday, November 15, with Division B scheduled in the morning session, at 11:32, and Division A scheduled in the afternoon session, at 14:02.

=== Division A ===
Rank	Name	Nat.	Pair	Lane	Time	WC points	GWC points
1st place, gold medalist(s)	Lee Sang-hwa	(South Korea)	10	i	36.57	100	5
2nd place, silver medalist(s)	Wang Beixing	(China)	9	i	36.85	80	4
3rd place, bronze medalist(s)	Heather Richardson	(United States)	8	i	36.97	70	3.5
4	Jenny Wolf	(Germany)	10	o	37.15	60	3
5	Olga Fatkulina	(Russia)	7	i	37.19	50	2.5
6	Margot Boer	(Netherlands)	9	o	37.28	45	—
7	Nao Kodaira	(Japan)	8	o	37.29	40	
8	Brittany Bowe	(United States)	6	o	37.32	36	
9	Judith Hesse	(Germany)	7	o	37.42	32	
10	Yu Jing	(China)	6	i	37.51	28	
11	Miyako Sumiyoshi	(Japan)	5	o	37.55	24	
12	Lauren Cholewinski	(United States)	3	o	37.60	21	
13	Yekaterina Aydova	(Kazakhstan)	1	i	37.64	18	
14	Erina Kamiya	(Japan)	3	i	37.66	16	
15	Thijsje Oenema	(Netherlands)	2	o	37.705	14	
16	Maki Tsuji	(Japan)	5	i	37.707	12	
17	Anice Das	(Netherlands)	4	i	37.84	10	
18	Mayon Kuipers	(Netherlands)	1	o	38.03	8	
19	Yuliya Liteykina	(Russia)	4	o	38.07	6	
20	Elli Ochowicz	(United States)	2	i	38.25	5	

=== Division B ===
Rank	Name	Nat.	Pair	Lane	Time	WC points
1	Zhang Hong	(China)	13	i	37.34	25
2	Yekaterina Malysheva	(Russia)	12	o	37.76	19
3	Jennifer Plate	(Germany)	13	o	37.86	15
4	Laurine van Riessen	(Netherlands)	16	o	38.092	11
5	Karolína Erbanová	(Czech Republic)	15	o	38.094	8
6	Lee Bo-ra	(South Korea)	14	o	38.18	6
7	Christine Nesbitt	(Canada)	16	i	38.21	4
8	Danielle Wotherspoon-Gregg	(Canada)	8	o	38.22	2
9	Kim Hyun-yung	(South Korea)	15	i	38.33	1
10	Marsha Hudey	(Canada)	14	i	38.351	—
11	Reika Shimizu	(Japan)	8	i	38.352	
12	Vanessa Bittner	(Austria)	9	i	38.358	
13	Shannon Rempel	(Canada)	10	o	38.37	
14	Denise Roth	(Germany)	11	i	38.44	
15	Yekaterina Lobysheva	(Russia)	12	i	38.53	
16	Qi Shuai	(China)	10	i	38.54	
17	Park Seung-ju	(South Korea)	11	o	38.56	
18	Sugar Todd	(United States)	7	i	38.59	
19	Kaylin Irvine	(Canada)	9	o	38.67	
20	Nadezhda Aseyeva	(Russia)	6	o	38.71	
21	Yvonne Daldossi	(Italy)	5	i	38.75	
22	Paola Simionato	(Italy)	5	o	38.77	
23	Zhang Shuang	(China)	7	o	38.82	
24	Elina Risku	(Finland)	4	o	38.83	
25	Francesca Bettrone	(Italy)	3	o	39.14	
26	Ágota Lykovcán	(Hungary)	4	i	39.21	
27	Ksenia Sadovskaya	(Belarus)	2	i	39.34	
28	Kaitlyn McGregor	(Switzerland)	3	i	39.407	
29	Ida Njåtun	(Norway)	1	i	39.408	
30	Mariya Sizova	(Kazakhstan)	2	o	40.87	
31	Monique Angermüller	(Germany)	6	i	49.37	

== Race 2 ==
Race two took place on Saturday, November 16, with Division B scheduled in the morning session, at 09:30, and Division A scheduled in the afternoon session, at 13:32.

=== Division A ===
Rank	Name	Nat.	Pair	Lane	Time	WC points	GWC points
1st place, gold medalist(s)	Lee Sang-hwa	(South Korea)	11	o	36.36	100	5
2nd place, silver medalist(s)	Heather Richardson	(United States)	9	o	36.90	80	4
3rd place, bronze medalist(s)	Olga Fatkulina	(Russia)	8	o	37.13	70	3.5
4	Wang Beixing	(China)	10	o	37.18	60	3
5	Yu Jing	(China)	6	o	37.31	50	2.5
6	Margot Boer	(Netherlands)	10	i	37.32	45	—
7	Judith Hesse	(Germany)	7	i	37.34	40	
8	Zhang Hong	(China)	7	o	37.35	36	
9	Brittany Bowe	(United States)	8	i	37.36	32	
10	Jenny Wolf	(Germany)	11	i	37.46	28	
11	Erina Kamiya	(Japan)	4	o	37.57	24	
12	Nao Kodaira	(Japan)	9	i	37.61	21	
13	Lauren Cholewinski	(United States)	5	i	37.623	18	
14	Thijsje Oenema	(Netherlands)	4	i	37.625	16	
15	Miyako Sumiyoshi	(Japan)	6	i	37.67	14	
16	Maki Tsuji	(Japan)	3	o	37.81	12	
17	Mayon Kuipers	(Netherlands)	3	i	37.92	10	
18	Yuliya Liteykina	(Russia)	2	i	37.97	8	
19	Anice Das	(Netherlands)	2	o	38.01	6	
20	Yekaterina Aydova	(Kazakhstan)	5	o	38.17	5	
21	Elli Ochowicz	(United States)	1	o	38.52	4	

=== Division B ===
Rank	Name	Nat.	Pair	Lane	Time	WC points
1	Jennifer Plate	(Germany)	13	i	38.04	25
2	Karolína Erbanová	(Czech Republic)	11	i	38.12	19
3	Laurine van Riessen	(Netherlands)	12	i	38.17	15
4	Yekaterina Malysheva	(Russia)	14	i	38.21	11
5	Marsha Hudey	(Canada)	13	o	38.290	8
6	Kim Hyun-yung	(South Korea)	14	o	38.296	6
7	Shannon Rempel	(Canada)	8	i	38.31	4
8	Vanessa Bittner	(Austria)	11	o	38.40	2
9	Denise Roth	(Germany)	10	o	38.43	1
10	Lee Bo-ra	(South Korea)	10	i	38.46	—
11	Reika Shimizu	(Japan)	12	o	38.55	
12	Sugar Todd	(United States)	8	o	38.56	
13	Zhang Shuang	(China)	3	i	38.66	
14	Paola Simionato	(Italy)	4	i	38.79	
15	Yvonne Daldossi	(Italy)	7	o	38.81	
16	Nadezhda Aseyeva	(Russia)	5	i	38.84	
17	Qi Shuai	(China)	9	o	38.877	
18	Danielle Wotherspoon-Gregg	(Canada)	9	i	38.879	
19	Park Seung-ju	(South Korea)	7	i	38.88	
20	Kaylin Irvine	(Canada)	6	i	38.90	
21	Elina Risku	(Finland)	2	i	39.01	
22	Heather McLean	(Canada)	2	o	39.21	
23	Ágota Lykovcán	(Hungary)	6	o	39.29	
24	Hege Bøkko	(Norway)	3	o	39.58	
25	Ksenia Sadovskaya	(Belarus)	5	o	39.64	
26	Kaitlyn McGregor	(Switzerland)	4	o	39.82	
27	Mariya Sizova	(Kazakhstan)	1	i	40.97	
