= 2013–14 ISU Speed Skating World Cup – World Cup 3 – Women's 500 metres =

The women's 500 metres races of the 2013–14 ISU Speed Skating World Cup 3, arranged in the Alau Ice Palace, in Astana, Kazakhstan, were held on 29 and 30 November 2013.

Lee Sang-hwa of South Korea won both races, extending her winning streak from the start of the season to six races. As the Alau Ice Palace is a low-altitude venue, she was not able to break the world record again, which she had done in the previous three races, but in the Friday race, she did skate the fastest time recorded on any rink outside Calgary and Salt Lake City with a time of 37.27 seconds.

In race one, Jenny Wolf of Germany came second, and Nao Kodaira of Japan came third, while Lee Bo-ra of South Korea won the Division B race.

In race two, Lee was again accompanied on the podium by Wolf in second place, but Olga Fatkulina of Russia took third place here. Annette Gerritsen of the Netherlands won the second Division B race.

== Race 1 ==
Race one took place on Friday, 29 November, with Division B in the afternoon session, scheduled at 13:30, and Division A scheduled in the evening session, at 18:00.

=== Division A ===
Rank	Name	Nat.	Pair	Lane	Time	WC points	GWC points
1st place, gold medalist(s)	Lee Sang-hwa	(South Korea)	10	i	37.27	100	5
2nd place, silver medalist(s)	Jenny Wolf	(Germany)	9	i	37.70	80	4
3rd place, bronze medalist(s)	Nao Kodaira	(Japan)	8	i	37.72	70	3.5
4	Heather Richardson	(United States)	10	o	37.76	60	3
5	Olga Fatkulina	(Russia)	9	o	37.80	50	2.5
6	Thijsje Oenema	(Netherlands)	5	i	37.92	45	—
7	Laurine van Riessen	(Netherlands)	4	o	38.01	40	
8	Yekaterina Aydova	(Kazakhstan)	4	i	38.02	36	
9	Maki Tsuji	(Japan)	7	o	38.033	32	
10	Brittany Bowe	(United States)	8	o	38.035	28	
11	Yekaterina Malysheva	(Russia)	1	o	38.12	24	
12	Lauren Cholewinski	(United States)	6	o	38.18	21	
13	Karolína Erbanová	(Czech Republic)	2	i	38.30	18	
14	Erina Kamiya	(Japan)	6	i	38.34	16	
15	Miyako Sumiyoshi	(Japan)	7	i	38.41	14	
16	Elli Ochowicz	(United States)	2	o	38.61	12	
17	Mayon Kuipers	(Netherlands)	1	i	38.63	10	
18	Anice Das	(Netherlands)	5	o	38.70	8	
19	Jennifer Plate	(Germany)	3	o	38.81	6	
20	Yuliya Liteykina	(Russia)	3	i	39.03	5	

=== Division B ===
Rank	Name	Nat.	Pair	Lane	Time	WC points
1	Lee Bo-ra	(South Korea)	8	o	38.73	25
2	Kaylin Irvine	(Canada)	5	i	38.80	19
3	Yekaterina Shikhova	(Russia)	7	i	39.08	15
4	Sugar Todd	(United States)	3	o	39.04	11
5	Reika Shimizu	(Japan)	3	i	39.21	8
6	Yuliya Skokova	(Russia)	2	o	39.24	6
7	Denise Roth	(Germany)	7	o	39.27	4
8	Zhang Shuang	(China)	5	o	39.30	2
9	Park Seung-ju	(South Korea)	6	o	39.36	1
10	Qi Shuai	(China)	6	i	39.39	—
11	Kim Hyun-yung	(South Korea)	8	i	39.48	
12	Elina Risku	(Finland)	4	i	39.88	
13	Francesca Bettrone	(Italy)	4	o	39.98	
14	Tatyana Sokirko	(Kazakhstan)	1	i	41:24	
15	Annette Gerritsen	(Netherlands)	2	i	DQ	

== Race 2 ==
Race two took place on Saturday, 30 November, with Division B scheduled in the afternoon session, at 13:30, and Division A scheduled in the evening session, at 17:30.

=== Division A ===
Rank	Name	Nat.	Pair	Lane	Time	WC points	GWC points
1st place, gold medalist(s)	Lee Sang-hwa	(South Korea)	10	o	37.32	100	5
2nd place, silver medalist(s)	Jenny Wolf	(Germany)	9	o	37.66	80	4
3rd place, bronze medalist(s)	Olga Fatkulina	(Russia)	9	i	37.81	70	3.5
4	Thijsje Oenema	(Netherlands)	8	o	37.98	60	3
5	Heather Richardson	(United States)	10	i	38.01	50	2.5
6	Maki Tsuji	(Japan)	7	i	38.283	45	—
7	Yekaterina Aydova	(Kazakhstan)	7	o	38.287	40	
8	Yekaterina Malysheva	(Russia)	5	i	38.31	36	
9	Laurine van Riessen	(Netherlands)	8	i	38.42	32	
10	Miyako Sumiyoshi	(Japan)	4	o	38.46	28	
11	Brittany Bowe	(United States)	6	i	38.47	24	
12	Lauren Cholewinski	(United States)	4	i	38.53	21	
13	Erina Kamiya	(Japan)	5	o	38.55	18	
14	Elli Ochowicz	(United States)	3	i	38.60	16	
15	Lee Bo-ra	(South Korea)	1	i	38.62	14	
16	Anice Das	(Netherlands)	2	i	38.67	12	
17	Karolína Erbanová	(Czech Republic)	6	o	38.68	10	
18	Mayon Kuipers	(Netherlands)	3	o	38.74	8	
19	Jennifer Plate	(Germany)	1	o	38.80	6	
20	Yuliya Liteykina	(Russia)	2	o	39.14	5	

=== Division B ===
Rank	Name	Nat.	Pair	Lane	Time	WC points
1	Annette Gerritsen	(Netherlands)	2	i	38.89	25
2	Kaylin Irvine	(Canada)	6	o	38.93	19
3	Kim Hyun-yung	(South Korea)	3	o	39.00	15
4	Sugar Todd	(United States)	6	i	39.11	11
5	Denise Roth	(Germany)	5	i	39.21	8
6	Reika Shimizu	(Japan)	5	o	39.26	6
7	Park Seung-ju	(South Korea)	3	i	39.28	4
8	Zhang Shuang	(China)	4	i	39.39	2
9	Qi Shuai	(China)	4	o	39.55	1
10	Elina Risku	(Finland)	2	o	39.75	—
11	Olga Graf	(Russia)	1	i	40.49	
12	Tatyana Sokirko	(Kazakhstan)	1	o	41.23	
