= 2013–14 ISU Speed Skating World Cup – World Cup 3 – Women's 1000 metres =

The women's 1000 metres race of the 2013–14 ISU Speed Skating World Cup 3, arranged in the Alau Ice Palace, in Astana, Kazakhstan, was held on 1 December 2013.

Heather Richardson of the United States won the race, while her compatriot Brittany Bowe came second, and Olga Fatkulina of Russia came third. Thijsje Oenema of the Netherlands won the Division B race.

== Results ==
The race took place on Sunday, 1 December, with Division B scheduled in the morning session, at 09:54, and Division A scheduled in the afternoon session, at 15:25.

=== Division A ===
| Rank | Name | Nat. | Pair | Lane | Time | WC points | GWC points |
|---|---|---|---|---|---|---|---|
| 1st place, gold medalist(s) | Heather Richardson | (United States) | 9 | i | 1:14.22 | 100 | 10 |
| 2nd place, silver medalist(s) | Brittany Bowe | (United States) | 9 | o | 1:14.78 | 80 | 8 |
| 3rd place, bronze medalist(s) | Olga Fatkulina | (Russia) | 8 | i | 1:15.18 | 70 | 7 |
| 4 | Yuliya Skokova | (Russia) | 4 | i | 1:15.66 | 60 | 6 |
| 5 | Lee Sang-hwa | (South Korea) | 7 | i | 1:15.70 | 50 | 5 |
| 6 | Yekaterina Aydova | (Kazakhstan) | 3 | i | 1:16.00 | 45 | — |
| 7 | Karolína Erbanová | (Czech Republic) | 6 | o | 1:16.28 | 40 | |
| 8 | Manon Kamminga | (Netherlands) | 5 | i | 1:16.37 | 36 | |
| 9 | Laurine van Riessen | (Netherlands) | 5 | o | 1:16.556 | 32 | |
| 10 | Nao Kodaira | (Japan) | 8 | o | 1:16.559 | 28 | |
| 11 | Gabriele Hirschbichler | (Germany) | 4 | o | 1:16.92 | 24 | |
| 12 | Kaylin Irvine | (Canada) | 1 | o | 1:17.01 | 21 | |
| 13 | Monique Angermüller | (Germany) | 7 | o | 1:17.227 | 18 | |
| 14 | Yuki Matsuda | (Japan) | 3 | o | 1:17.229 | 16 | |
| 15 | Maki Tsuji | (Japan) | 2 | o | 1:17.63 | 14 | |
| 16 | Ji Jia | (China) | 2 | i | 1:18.01 | 12 | |
| 17 | Erina Kamiya | (Japan) | 1 | i | 1:18.87 | 10 | |
| 18 | Kim Hyun-yung | (South Korea) | 6 | i | 1:18.94 | 8 | |

=== Division B ===
| Rank | Name | Nat. | Pair | Lane | Time | WC points |
|---|---|---|---|---|---|---|
| 1 | Thijsje Oenema | (Netherlands) | 3 | o | 1:16.94 | 25 |
| 2 | Li Qishi | (China) | 1 | i | 1:17.07 | 19 |
| 3 | Anice Das | (Netherlands) | 2 | i | 1:17.08 | 15 |
| 4 | Annette Gerritsen | (Netherlands) | 2 | o | 1:17.69 | 11 |
| 5 | Natalia Czerwonka | (Poland) | 8 | o | 1:18.12 | 8 |
| 6 | Miho Takagi | (Japan) | 8 | i | 1:18.39 | 6 |
| 7 | Yevgeniya Dmitriyeva | (Russia) | 1 | o | 1:18.57 | 4 |
| 8 | Zhao Xin | (China) | 4 | o | 1:18.68 | 2 |
| 9 | Rebekah Bradford | (United States) | 5 | i | 1:18.71 | 1 |
| 10 | Sugar Todd | (United States) | 7 | i | 1:18.85 | — |
| 11 | Lee Bo-ra | (South Korea) | 7 | o | 1:19.26 | |
| 12 | Ahn Jee-min | (South Korea) | 6 | i | 1:19.59 | |
| 13 | Denise Roth | (Germany) | 4 | i | 1:19.94 | |
| 14 | Qi Shuai | (China) | 6 | o | 1:20.17 | |
| 15 | Francesca Bettrone | (Italy) | 5 | o | 1:20.59 | |
| 16 | Tatyana Sokirko | (Kazakhstan) | 3 | i | 1:20.61 | |
