= 2013–14 ISU Speed Skating World Cup – World Cup 3 – Men's 10000 metres =

The men's 10000 metres race of the 2013–14 ISU Speed Skating World Cup 3, arranged in the Alau Ice Palace, in Astana, Kazakhstan, was held on 1 December 2013.

Sven Kramer of the Netherlands won the race, extending his winning streak from the start of the season, while Alexis Contin of France came second, and Patrick Beckert of Germany came third. Douwe de Vries of the Netherlands won the Division B race.

== Results ==
The race took place on Sunday, 1 December, with Division B scheduled in the morning session, at 10:49, and Division A scheduled in the afternoon session, from 16:10.

=== Division A ===
Rank	Name	Nat.	Pair	Lane	Time	WC points	GWC points
1st place, gold medalist(s)	Sven Kramer	(Netherlands)	6	i	13:02.38	100	10
2nd place, silver medalist(s)	Alexis Contin	(France)	4	i	13:14.64	80	8
3rd place, bronze medalist(s)	Patrick Beckert	(Germany)	3	i	13:18.73	70	7
4	Bart Swings	(Belgium)	3	o	13:19.27	60	6
5	Lee Seung-hoon	(South Korea)	6	o	13:20.94	50	5
6	Jonathan Kuck	(United States)	5	i	13:23.54	45	—
7	Håvard Bøkko	(Norway)	1	i	13:24.59	40	
8	Moritz Geisreiter	(Germany)	4	o	13:26.52	35	
9	Daniil Sinitsyn	(Russia)	2	o	13:26.74	30	
10	Sverre Lunde Pedersen	(Norway)	5	o	13:27.87	25	
11	Shane Dobbin	(New Zealand)	2	i	13:32.46	21	
12	Marco Weber	(Germany)	1	o	13:37.52	18	

=== Division B ===
Rank	Name	Nat.	Pair	Lane	Time	WC points
1	Douwe de Vries	(Netherlands)	15	o	13:05:58	32
2	Bob de Vries	(Netherlands)	3	i	13:07.01	27
3	Robert Bovenhuis	(Netherlands)	3	o	13:12.75	23
4	Alexej Baumgärtner	(Germany)	13	i	13:16.34	19
5	Aleksandr Rumyantsev	(Russia)	14	i	13:18.40	15
6	Dmitry Babenko	(Kazakhstan)	15	i	13:18.70	11
7	Yevgeny Seryaev	(Russia)	13	o	13:19.06	9
8	Jordan Belchos	(Canada)	11	o	13:24.65	7
9	Jan Szymański	(Poland)	12	o	13:28.91	6
10	Arjen van der Kieft	(Netherlands)	4	i	13:33.08	5
11	Takuro Ogawa	(Japan)	2	o	13:35.42	4
12	Marco Cignini	(Italy)	7	i	13:36.99	3
13	Emery Lehman	(United States)	14	o	13:38.81	2
14	Ko Byung-wook	(South Korea)	10	o	13:43.45	1
15	Fredrik van der Horst	(Norway)	1	o	13:47.14	—
16	Mathieu Giroux	(Canada)	9	i	13:48.27	
17	Patrick Meek	(United States)	10	i	13:49.28	
18	Sun Longjiang	(China)	8	o	13:49.51	
19	Roland Cieslak	(Poland)	5	o	13:53.86	
20	Alec Janssens	(Canada)	2	i	13:54.02	
21	Joo Hyong-jun	(South Korea)	8	i	13:55.52	
22	Lee Jin-yeong	(South Korea)	7	o	13:56.88	
23	Luca Stefani	(Italy)	1	i	13:56.89	
24	Ferre Spruyt	(Belgium)	6	o	13:57.30	
25	Sebastian Druszkiewicz	(Poland)	9	o	14:04.71	
26	Martin Hänggi	(Switzerland)	4	o	14:10.56	
27	Viktor Hald Thorup	(Denmark)	6	i	14:36.94	
28	Roger Schneider	(Switzerland)	5	i	DNF	
29	Ewen Fernandez	(France)	12	i	DQ	
30	Kim Cheol-min	(South Korea)	11	i	DNS	
