= 2013–14 ISU Speed Skating World Cup – World Cup 3 – Men's 1500 metres =

The men's 1500 metres race of the 2013–14 ISU Speed Skating World Cup 3, arranged in the Alau Ice Palace, in Astana, Kazakhstan, was held on 29 November 2013.

Denis Yuskov of Russia won the race, while Koen Verweij of the Netherlands came second, and Zbigniew Bródka of Poland came third. Joey Mantia of the United States won the Division B race.

== Results ==
The race took place on Friday, 29 November, with Division B scheduled in the afternoon session, at 15:48, and Division A scheduled in the evening session, at 19:46.

=== Division A ===
Rank	Name	Nat.	Pair	Lane	Time	WC points	GWC points
1st place, gold medalist(s)	Denis Yuskov	(Russia)	9	o	1:45.06	100	10
2nd place, silver medalist(s)	Koen Verweij	(Netherlands)	10	o	1:45.23	80	8
3rd place, bronze medalist(s)	Zbigniew Bródka	(Poland)	9	i	1:45.78	70	7
4	Sverre Lunde Pedersen	(Norway)	8	o	1:45.87	60	6
5	Shani Davis	(United States)	10	i	1:45.92	50	5
6	Rhian Ket	(Netherlands)	6	o	1:46.21	45	—
7	Denis Kuzin	(Kazakhstan)	5	o	1:46.30	40	
8	Alexis Contin	(France)	7	o	1:46.31	36	
9	Håvard Bøkko	(Norway)	5	i	1:46.37	32	
10	Konrad Niedźwiedzki	(Poland)	7	i	1:46.52	28	
11	Denny Morrison	(Canada)	8	i	1:46.53	24	
12	Trevor Marsicano	(United States)	6	i	1:46.84	21	
13	Haralds Silovs	(Latvia)	4	i	1:47.45	18	
14	Håvard Holmefjord Lorentzen	(Norway)	3	o	1:47.69	16	
15	Yevgeny Lalenkov	(Russia)	1	o	1:47.71	14	
16	Aleksey Yesin	(Russia)	4	o	1:47.72	12	
17	Lucas Makowsky	(Canada)	2	o	1:47.77	10	
18	Aleksey Suvorov	(Russia)	1	i	1:48.18	8	
19	Jonathan Kuck	(United States)	3	i	1:48.29	6	
20	Jan Szymański	(Poland)	2	i	DQ		

=== Division B ===
Rank	Name	Nat.	Pair	Lane	Time	WC points
1	Joey Mantia	(United States)	16	o	1:46.45	25
2	Stefan Groothuis	(Netherlands)	4	o	1:46.79	19
3	Bart Swings	(Belgium)	16	i	1:46.82	15
4	Pim Schipper	(Netherlands)	3	o	1:47.14	11
5	Douwe de Vries	(Netherlands)	5	i	1:47.19	8
6	Joo Hyong-jun	(South Korea)	12	i	1:47.39	6
7	Tian Guojun	(China)	8	i	1:47.97	4
8	Sergey Gryaztsov	(Russia)	15	o	1:48.03	2
9	Fyodor Mezentsev	(Kazakhstan)	11	i	1:48.19	1
10	Mathieu Giroux	(Canada)	15	i	1:48.22	—
11	Alec Janssens	(Canada)	4	i	1:48.31	
12	Kim Cheol-min	(South Korea)	14	o	1:48.33	
13	Mirko Giacomo Nenzi	(Italy)	14	i	1:48.53	
14	Ewen Fernandez	(France)	7	i	1:48.67	
15	Christoffer Fagerli Rukke	(Norway)	9	o	1:48.69	
16	David Andersson	(Sweden)	11	o	1:48.73	
17	Bram Smallenbroek	(Austria)	12	o	1:48.91	
18	Tyler Derraugh	(Canada)	5	o	1:48.98	
19	Moritz Geisreiter	(Germany)	6	i	1:49.38	
20	Luca Stefani	(Italy)	2	o	1:49.49	
21	Jan Daldossi	(Italy)	8	o	1:49.54	
22	Shota Nakamura	(Japan)	9	i	1:49.60	
23	Maciej Biega	(Poland)	7	o	1:49.61	
24	Aleksandr Zhigin	(Kazakhstan)	10	o	1:49.65	
25	Shane Dobbin	(New Zealand)	10	i	1:49.96	
26	Hubert Hirschbichler	(Germany)	2	i	1:50.23	
27	Konrád Nagy	(Hungary)	13	i	1:50.46	
28	Maksim Baklashkin	(Russia)	1	i	1:50.66	
29	Darren Ta-Yuan Huang	(Chinese Taipei)	6	o	1:51.51	
30	Taro Kondo	(Japan)	13	o	1:52.07	
31	Jonathan Garcia	(United States)	3	i	DQ	
