= 2013–14 ISU Speed Skating World Cup – World Cup 3 =

The third competition weekend of the 2013–14 ISU Speed Skating World Cup was held in the Alau Ice Palace in Astana, Kazakhstan, from Friday, 29 November, until Sunday, 1 December 2013. It was previously announced to be in Heerenveen, Netherlands.

There were no new world records this weekend, but Lee Sang-hwa of South Korea set a new low-altitude record on the women's 500 metres on Friday, as she skated the fastest time recorded on any rink outside Calgary and Salt Lake City, continuing her winning streak from the start of the season through Saturday's race. Shani Davis of the United States and Sven Kramer of the Netherlands also continued their unbeaten streaks, on the men's 1000 metres and 5000/10000 meters, respectively.

== Schedule ==
The detailed schedule of events:

Date	Session	Events	Comment
Friday, 29 November	Afternoon	13:30: 500 m women (1); 13:52: 5000 m women 15:48: 1500 m men	Division B
Friday, 29 November	Evening	18:00: 500 m women (1); 18:38: 5000 m women 19:46: 1500 m men	Division A
Saturday, 30 November	Afternoon	13:30: 500 m women (2); 13:50: 500 m men (1); 14:38: 1500 m women 15:40: 1000 m men	Division B
Saturday, 30 November	Evening	17:30: 500 m women (2); 17:55: 500 m men (1); 18:35: 1500 m women 19:27: 1000 m men	Division A
Sunday, 1 December	Morning	09:30: 500 m men (2); 09:54: 1000 m women 10:49: 10000 m men	Division B
Sunday, 1 December	Afternoon	15:00: 500 m men (2); 15:25: 1000 m women 16:10: 10000 m men	Division A

All times are BTT (UTC+6).

== Medal summary ==
=== Men's events ===
Event	Race #	Gold	Time	Silver	Time	Bronze	Time	Report
500 m	1	Artyom Kuznetsov; Russia	34.85	Dmitry Lobkov; Russia	34.86	Ronald Mulder; Netherlands	34.87	
500 m	2	Keiichiro Nagashima; Japan	34.69	Mo Tae-bum; South Korea	34.87	Artyom Kuznetsov; Russia	34.92	
1000 m		Shani Davis; United States	1:08.66	Mirko Giacomo Nenzi; Italy	1:08.90	Michel Mulder; Netherlands	1:09.02	
1500 m		Denis Yuskov; Russia	1:45.06	Koen Verweij; Netherlands	1:45.23	Zbigniew Bródka; Poland	1:45.78	
10000 m		Sven Kramer; Netherlands	13:02.38	Alexis Contin; France	13:14.64	Patrick Beckert; Germany	13:18.73	

=== Women's events ===
Event	Race #	Gold	Time	Silver	Time	Bronze	Time	Report
500 m	1	Lee Sang-hwa; South Korea	37.27	Jenny Wolf; Germany	37.70	Nao Kodaira; Japan	37.72	
500 m	2	Lee Sang-hwa; South Korea	37.32	Jenny Wolf; Germany	37.66	Olga Fatkulina; Russia	37.81	
1000 m		Heather Richardson; United States	1:14.22	Brittany Bowe; United States	1:14.78	Olga Fatkulina; Russia	1:15.18	
1500 m		Brittany Bowe; United States	1.57.28	Yuliya Skokova; Russia	1.57.70	Brittany Schussler; Canada	1.57.78	
5000 m		Martina Sáblíková; Czech Republic	6:59.88	Claudia Pechstein; Germany	7:01.10	Yvonne Nauta; Netherlands	7:04.64	

== Standings ==
The top ten standings in the contested cups after the weekend.

=== Men's cups ===
500 m

#	Name	Nat.	CAL1	CAL2	SLC1	SLC2	AST1	AST2	Total
1	Ronald Mulder	(Netherlands)	100	70	24	80	70	32	376
2	Mo Tae-bum	(South Korea)	80	80	5	70	32	80	347
3	Michel Mulder	(Netherlands)	60	32	70	60	21	45	288
4	Keiichiro Nagashima	(Japan)	19	4	16	100	45	100	284
5	Artyom Kuznetsov	(Russia)	50	14	36	14	100	70	284
6	Joji Kato	(Japan)	10	40	100	21	50	60	281
7	Tucker Fredricks	(United States)	25	100	50	8	45	50	278
8	Jamie Gregg	(Canada)	70	70	40	50			230
9	Mitchell Whitmore	(United States)	36	50	60	40	28	14	228
10	Jan Smeekens	(Netherlands)	40	40	45	12	60	28	225

1000 m

#	Name	Nat.	CAL	SLC	AST	Total
1	Shani Davis	(United States)	100	100	100	300
2	Kjeld Nuis	(Netherlands)	80	80		160
3	Michel Mulder	(Netherlands)	32	50	70	152
4	Denny Morrison	(Canada)	24	60	60	144
5	Denis Kuzin	(Kazakhstan)	60	36	45	141
6	Brian Hansen	(United States)	70	70		140
7	Koen Verweij	(Netherlands)	50	32	36	118
8	Mirko Giacomo Nenzi	(Italy)	19	14	80	113
9	Jamie Gregg	(Canada)	40	40		80
10	Konrad Niedźwiedzki	(Poland)	1	25	50	76

1500 m

#	Name	Nat.	CAL	SLC	AST	Total
1	Koen Verweij	(Netherlands)	100	70	80	250
2	Shani Davis	(United States)	80	100	50	230
3	Denis Yuskov	(Russia)	14	60	100	174
4	Zbigniew Bródka	(Poland)	36	45	70	151
5	Sverre Lunde Pedersen	(Norway)	45	28	60	133
6	Kjeld Nuis	(Netherlands)	70	40		110
7	Brian Hansen	(United States)	25	80		105
8	Alexis Contin	(Netherlands)	50	16	36	102
9	Konrad Niedźwiedzki	(Poland)	40	32	28	100
10	Denny Morrison	(Canada)	24	50	24	98

5000/10000 m

#	Name	Nat.	CAL	SLC	AST	Total
1	Sven Kramer	(Netherlands)	100	100	100	300
2	Lee Seung-hoon	(South Korea)	70	40	50	160
3	Jorrit Bergsma	(Netherlands)	80	70		150
4	Bob de Jong	(Netherlands)	60	80		140
5	Alexis Contin	(France)	27	30	80	137
6	Jonathan Kuck	(United States)	32	50	45	127
7	Patrick Beckert	(Germany)	30	21	70	121
8	Bart Swings	(Belgium)	25	25	60	110
9	Sverre Lunde Pedersen	(Norway)	35	45	25	105
10	Moritz Geisreiter	(Germany)	40	16	35	91

Grand World Cup

#	Name	Nat.	CAL	SLC	AST	Total
1	Shani Davis	(United States)	18	20	15	53
2	Koen Verweij	(Netherlands)	20	7	8	35
3	Sven Kramer	(Netherlands)	10	10	10	30
4	Kjeld Nuis	(Netherlands)	15	8		23
5	Brian Hansen	(United States)	7	15		22
6	Michel Mulder	(Netherlands)	6.5	8	7	21.5
7	Denny Morrison	(Canada)		11	6	17
8	Ronald Mulder	(Netherlands)	8.5	4	3.5	16
8	Denis Yuskov	(Russia)		6	10	16
10	Mo Tae-bum	(South Korea)	8	3.5	4	15.5

=== Women's cups ===
500 m

#	Name	Nat.	CAL1	CAL2	SLC1	SLC2	AST1	AST2	Total
1	Lee Sang-hwa	(South Korea)	100	100	100	100	100	100	600
2	Jenny Wolf	(Germany)	80	80	60	28	80	80	408
3	Heather Richardson	(United States)	50	50	70	80	60	50	360
4	Olga Fatkulina	(Russia)	45	45	50	70	50	70	330
5	Wang Beixing	(China)	70	70	80	60			280
6	Nao Kodaira	(Japan)	60	36	40	21	70		227
7	Margot Boer	(Netherlands)	40	60	45	45			190
8	Brittany Bowe	(United States)	32	28	36	32	28	24	180
9	Thijsje Oenema	(Netherlands)	10	18	14	16	45	60	163
10	Maki Tsuji	(Japan)	28	24	12	12	32	45	153

1000 m

#	Name	Nat.	CAL	SLC	AST	Total
1	Heather Richardson	(United States)	100	80	100	280
2	Brittany Bowe	(United States)	70	100	80	250
3	Olga Fatkulina	(Russia)	50	60	70	180
4	Lotte van Beek	(Netherlands)	80	32		112
5	Ireen Wüst	(Netherlands)	40	70		110
6	Lee Sang-hwa	(South Korea)	60		50	110
7	Margot Boer	(Netherlands)	45	50		95
8	Nao Kodaira	(Japan)	24	40	28	92
9	Yuliya Skokova	(Russia)	15	8	60	83
10	Karolína Erbanová	(Czech Republic)	16	18	40	74

1500 m

#	Name	Nat.	CAL	SLC	AST	Total
1	Brittany Bowe	(United States)	19	80	100	199
2	Ireen Wüst	(Netherlands)	80	100		180
3	Yuliya Skokova	(Russia)	32	50	80	162
4	Lotte van Beek	(Netherlands)	100	60		160
5	Ida Njåtun	(Norway)	45	36	32	113
6	Claudia Pechstein	(Germany)	36	24	45	105
7	Brittany Schussler	(Canada)	8	19	70	97
8	Heather Richardson	(United States)	25	70		95
9	Monique Angermüller	(Germany)	21	32	40	93
10	Yekaterina Lobysheva	(Russia)	50	40		90

3000/5000 m

#	Name	Nat.	CAL	SLC	AST	Total
1	Martina Sáblíková	(Czech Republic)	80	100	100	280
2	Claudia Pechstein	(Germany)	100	80	80	260
3	Yvonne Nauta	(Netherlands)	45	21	70	136
4	Antoinette de Jong	(Netherlands)	60	70		130
5	Ida Njåtun	(Norway)	40	45	30	115
6	Shiho Ishizawa	(Japan)	27	25	60	112
7	Jorien Voorhuis	(Netherlands)	50	60		110
8	Katarzyna Bachleda-Curuś	(Poland)	35	40	35	110
9	Masako Hozumi	(Japan)	23	35	45	103
10	Nana Takagi	(Japan)	25	16	50	91

Grand World Cup

#	Name	Nat.	CAL	SLC	AST	Total
1	Heather Richardson	(United States)	15	22.5	15.5	53
2	Brittany Bowe	(United States)	7	18	18	43
3	Lee Sang-hwa	(South Korea)	16	10	15	41
4	Martina Sáblíková	(Czech Republic)	15	10	10	35
5	Ireen Wüst	(Netherlands)	15	17		32
6	Olga Fatkulina	(Russia)	5	12	13	30
7	Claudia Pechstein	(Germany)	10	8	8	26
8	Lotte van Beek	(Netherlands)	18	6		24
9	Yuliya Skokova	(Russia)		5	14	19
9	Jenny Wolf	(Germany)	8	3	8	19
