= 2013–14 ISU Speed Skating World Cup – World Cup 3 – Women's 1500 metres =

The women's 1500 metres race of the 2013–14 ISU Speed Skating World Cup 3, arranged in the Alau Ice Palace, in Astana, Kazakhstan, was held on 30 November 2013.

Brittany Bowe of the United States won the race, while Yuliya Skokova of Russia came second, and Brittany Schussler of Canada came third. Kim Bo-reum of South Korea won the Division B race.

== Results ==
The race took place on Saturday, 30 November, with Division B scheduled in the afternoon session, at 15:48, and Division A scheduled in the evening session, at 19:46.

=== Division A ===
Rank	Name	Nat.	Pair	Lane	Time	WC points	GWC points
1st place, gold medalist(s)	Brittany Bowe	(United States)	9	i	1:57.28	100	10
2nd place, silver medalist(s)	Yuliya Skokova	(Russia)	9	o	1:57.70	80	8
3rd place, bronze medalist(s)	Brittany Schussler	(Canada)	5	i	1:57.78	70	7
4	Olga Graf	(Russia)	2	o	1:57.90	60	6
5	Luiza Złotkowska	(Poland)	6	o	1:58.19	50	5
6	Claudia Pechstein	(Germany)	7	i	1:58.68	45	—
7	Monique Angermüller	(Germany)	7	o	1:58.71	40	
8	Karolína Erbanová	(Czech Republic)	4	o	1:58.73	36	
9	Ida Njåtun	(Norway)	8	i	1:58.96	32	
10	Jilleanne Rookard	(United States)	3	i	1:59.17	28	
11	Ayaka Kikuchi	(Japan)	3	o	1:59.26	24	
12	Maki Tabata	(Japan)	6	i	1:59.30	21	
13	Annouk van der Weijden	(Netherlands)	1	i	1:59.47	18	
14	Nana Takagi	(Japan)	4	i	1:59.99	16	
15	Natalia Czerwonka	(Poland)	5	o	2:00.18	14	
16	Katarzyna Bachleda-Curuś	(Poland)	8	o	2:00.32	12	
17	Gabriele Hirschbichler	(Germany)	2	i	2:00.55	10	
18	Nao Kodaira	(Japan)	1	o	2:00.95	8	

=== Division B ===
Rank	Name	Nat.	Pair	Lane	Time	WC points
1	Kim Bo-reum	(South Korea)	10	o	1:58.12	25
2	Yevgeniya Dmitriyeva	(Russia)	3	o	1:59.66	19
3	Laurine van Riessen	(Netherlands)	3	i	1:59.71	15
4	Noh Seon-yeong	(South Korea)	10	i	1:59.85	11
5	Yuki Matsuda	(Japan)	9	o	2:00.40	8
6	Carlijn Achtereekte	(Netherlands)	2	o	2:00.49	6
7	Zhao Xin	(China)	8	i	2:00.50	4
8	Liu Jing	(China)	1	o	2:01.22	2
9	Anna Chernova	(Russia)	5	i	2:01.60	1
10	Anna Rokita	(Austria)	6	o	2:01.61	—
11	Kelly Gunther	(United States)	6	i	2:01.83	
12	Yang Shin-young	(South Korea)	9	i	2:02.29	
13	Ivanie Blondin	(Canada)	2	i	2:02.46	
14	Katarzyna Woźniak	(Poland)	7	i	2:02.98	
15	Francesca Bettrone	(Italy)	7	o	2:03.99	
16	Nicole Garrido	(Canada)	1	i	2:04.03	
17	Tatyana Sokirko	(Kazakhstan)	5	o	2:04.05	
18	Mari Hemmer	(Norway)	8	o	2:05.69	
19	Yelena Urvantseva	(Kazakhstan)	4	i	2:05.88	
20	Nikola Zdráhalová	(Czech Republic)	4	o	2:07.46	
