= 2013–14 ISU Speed Skating World Cup – World Cup 3 – Men's 1000 metres =

The men's 1000 metres race of the 2013–14 ISU Speed Skating World Cup 3, arranged in the Alau Ice Palace, in Astana, Kazakhstan, was held on 30 November 2013.

Shani Davis of the United States won the race, extending his winning streak from the start of the season, while Mirko Giacomo Nenzi of Italy came second, and Michel Mulder of the Netherlands came third. Pim Schipper of the Netherlands won the Division B race.

== Results ==
The race took place on Saturday, 30 November, with Division B scheduled in the afternoon session, at 15:40, and Division A scheduled in the evening session, at 19:27.

=== Division A ===
Rank	Name	Nat.	Pair	Lane	Time	WC points	GWC points
1st place, gold medalist(s)	Shani Davis	(United States)	10	i	1:08.66	100	10
2nd place, silver medalist(s)	Mirko Giacomo Nenzi	(Italy)	5	i	1:08.90	80	8
3rd place, bronze medalist(s)	Michel Mulder	(Netherlands)	9	o	1:09.02	70	7
4	Denny Morrison	(Canada)	9	i	1:09.15	60	6
5	Konrad Niedźwiedzki	(Poland)	3	i	1:09.21	50	5
6	Denis Kuzin	(Kazakhstan)	10	o	1:09.221	45	—
7	Stefan Groothuis	(Netherlands)	5	o	1:09.222	40	
8	Koen Verweij	(Netherlands)	8	i	1:09.36	36	
9	Håvard Holmefjord Lorentzen	(Norway)	2	i	1:09.54	32	
10	Mo Tae-bum	(South Korea)	7	i	1:09.56	28	
11	Zbigniew Bródka	(Poland)	1	i	1:09.57	24	
12	Yevgeny Lalenkov	(Russia)	3	o	1:09.83	21	
13	Trevor Marsicano	(United States)	1	o	1:09.94	18	
14	Mitchell Whitmore	(United States)	8	o	1:10.05	16	
15	Haralds Silovs	(Latvia)	2	o	1:10.07	14	
16	Dmitry Lobkov	(Russia)	4	i	1:10.11	12	
17	Sjoerd de Vries	(Netherlands)	6	i	1:10.11	10	
18	Aleksey Yesin	(Russia)	7	o	1:10.23	8	
19	Daniel Greig	(Australia)	4	o	1:10.47	6	
20	Mika Poutala	(Finland)	6	o	1:11.56	5	

=== Division B ===
Rank	Name	Nat.	Pair	Lane	Time	WC points
1	Pim Schipper	(Netherlands)	4	o	1:09.01	25
2	Joey Mantia	(United States)	12	i	1:09.31	19
3	Jonathan Garcia	(United States)	4	i	1:09.49	15
4	Willam Dutton	(Canada)	5	o	1:10.28	11
5	Tyler Derraugh	(Canada)	15	i	1:10.30	8
6	Nico Ihle	(Germany)	15	o	1:10.33	6
7	Tian Guojun	(China)	10	o	1:10.38	4
8	Roman Krech	(Kazakhstan)	2	i	1:10.45	2
9	Denis Yuskov	(Russia)	1	i	1:10.46	1
10	Lucas Makowsky	(Canada)	3	i	1:10.53	—
11	Håvard Bøkko	(Norway)	9	i	1:10.54	
12	Fyodor Mezentsev	(Kazakhstan)	13	o	1:10.64	
13	Lee Kyou-hyuk	(South Korea)	14	i	1:10.73	
14	Bart Swings	(Belgium)	7	i	1:10.74	
15	Christoffer Fagerli Rukke	(Norway)	11	i	1:10.78	
16	Aleksandr Zhigin	(Kazakhstan)	12	o	1:10.88	
17	David Andersson	(Sweden)	8	i	1:10.92	
18	Kim Tae-yun	(South Korea)	14	o	1:11.10	
19	Daicho Yamanaka	(Japan)	11	o	1:11.22	
20	Hubert Hirschbichler	(Germany)	3	o	1:11.28	
21	Jan Daldossi	(Italy)	8	o	1:11.34	
22	Denis Dressel	(Germany)	13	i	1:11.67	
23	Taro Kondo	(Japan)	6	i	1:11.90	
24	Darren Ta-Yuan Huang	(Chinese Taipei)	2	o	1:11.94	
25	Sun Longjiang	(China)	7	o	1:12.00	
26	Bram Smallenbroek	(Austria)	9	o	1:12.03	
27	Artyom Kuznetsov	(Russia)	10	i	1:12.38	
28	Mark Jackson	(New Zealand)	5	i	1:12.90	
29	Tommi Pulli	(Finland)	6	o	1:44.00	
