= 2013–14 ISU Speed Skating World Cup – World Cup 3 – Women's 5000 metres =

The women's 5000 metres race of the 2013–14 ISU Speed Skating World Cup 3, arranged in the Alau Ice Palace, in Astana, Kazakhstan, was held on 29 November 2013.

Martina Sáblíková of the Czech Republic won the race, while Claudia Pechstein of Germany came second, and Yvonne Nauta of the Netherlands came third. Carlijn Achtereekte of the Netherlands won the Division B race.

== Results ==
The race took place on Friday, 29 November, with Division B scheduled in the afternoon session, at 13:52, and Division A scheduled in the evening session, at 18:38.

=== Division A ===
| Rank | Name | Nat. | Pair | Lane | Time | WC points | GWC points |
|---|---|---|---|---|---|---|---|
| 1st place, gold medalist(s) | Martina Sáblíková | (Czech Republic) | 6 | i | 6.59.88 | 100 | 10 |
| 2nd place, silver medalist(s) | Claudia Pechstein | (Germany) | 6 | o | 7:01.10 | 80 | 8 |
| 3rd place, bronze medalist(s) | Yvonne Nauta | (Netherlands) | 4 | i | 7:04.64 | 70 | 7 |
| 4 | Shiho Ishizawa | (Japan) | 3 | o | 7:06.79 | 60 | 6 |
| 5 | Nana Takagi | (Japan) | 1 | i | 7:10.50 | 50 | 5 |
| 6 | Masako Hozumi | (Japan) | 3 | i | 7:11.02 | 45 | — |
| 7 | Olga Graf | (Russia) | 1 | o | 7:11.43 | 40 | |
| 8 | Katarzyna Bachleda-Curuś | (Poland) | 5 | o | 7:14.40 | 35 | |
| 9 | Ida Njåtun | (Norway) | 5 | i | 7:14.54 | 30 | |
| 10 | Ayaka Kikuchi | (Japan) | 2 | o | 7:14.79 | 25 | |
| 11 | Jilleanne Rookard | (United States) | 2 | i | 7:15.62 | 21 | |
| 12 | Luiza Złotkowska | (Poland) | 4 | o | 7:16.06 | 18 | |

=== Division B ===
| Rank | Name | Nat. | Pair | Lane | Time | WC points |
|---|---|---|---|---|---|---|
| 1 | Carlijn Achtereekte | (Netherlands) | 3 | o | 7:03.55 | 32 |
| 2 | Carien Kleibeuker | (Netherlands) | 4 | o | 7:04.31 | 27 |
| 3 | Annouk van der Weijden | (Netherlands) | 13 | o | 7:05.59 | 23 |
| 4 | Rixt Meijer | (Netherlands) | 3 | i | 7:06.87 | 19 |
| 5 | Stephanie Beckert | (Germany) | 12 | i | 7:09.45 | 15 |
| 6 | Kim Bo-reum | (South Korea) | 15 | o | 7:09.99 | 11 |
| 7 | Maria Lamb | (United States) | 2 | i | 7:12.01 | 9 |
| 8 | Anna Chernova | (Russia) | 9 | o | 7:12.23 | 7 |
| 9 | Mari Hemmer | (Norway) | 10 | o | 7:13.46 | 6 |
| 10 | Francesca Lollobrigida | (Italy) | 11 | i | 7:14.03 | 5 |
| 11 | Bente Kraus | (Germany) | 15 | i | 7:15.07 | 4 |
| 12 | Ivanie Blondin | (Canada) | 10 | i | 7:15.42 | 3 |
| 13 | Fuyo Matsuoka | (Japan) | 2 | o | 7:15.66 | 2 |
| 14 | Yang Shin-young | (South Korea) | 9 | i | 7:15.98 | 1 |
| 15 | Anna Rokita | (Austria) | 8 | i | 7:16.46 | — |
| 16 | Natalia Czerwonka | (Poland) | 11 | o | 7:18.55 | |
| 17 | Lada Zadonskaya | (Russia) | 6 | o | 7:18.70 | |
| 18 | Viktoriya Filyushkina | (Russia) | 7 | i | 7:18.77 | |
| 19 | Nicole Garrido | (Canada) | 7 | o | 7:19.08 | |
| 20 | Park Do-yeong | (South Korea) | 6 | i | 7:19.17 | |
| 21 | Tatyana Ushakova | (Russia) | 1 | i | 7:19.82 | |
| 22 | Liu Jing | (China) | 5 | i | 7:20.13 | |
| 23 | Jun Ye-jin | (South Korea) | 4 | i | 7:20.45 | |
| 24 | Jennifer Bay | (Germany) | 12 | o | 7:20.51 | |
| 25 | Brittany Schussler | (Canada) | 14 | i | 7:25.27 | |
| 26 | Jelena Peeters | (Belgium) | 13 | i | 7:26.24 | |
| 27 | Katarzyna Woźniak | (Poland) | 14 | o | 7:27.39 | |
| 28 | Petra Acker | (United States) | 8 | o | 7:31.03 | |
| 29 | Yelena Urvantseva | (Russia) | 5 | o | 7:51.37 | |
