= 2013–14 ISU Speed Skating World Cup – World Cup 1 – Women's 1500 metres =

The women's 1500 metres race of the 2013–14 ISU Speed Skating World Cup 1, arranged in the Olympic Oval, in Calgary, Alberta, Canada, was held on 9 November 2013.

Lotte van Beek of the Netherlands won, while Ireen Wüst, also of the Netherlands, came second, and Martina Sáblíková of the Czech Republic came third. Heather Richardson of the United States won Division B.

== Results ==
The race took place on Saturday, 9 November, with Division A scheduled in the morning session, at 12:19, and Division B scheduled in the afternoon session, at 17:26.

=== Division A ===
| Rank | Name | Nat. | Pair | Lane | Time | WC points | GWC points |
|---|---|---|---|---|---|---|---|
| 1st place, gold medalist(s) | Lotte van Beek | (Netherlands) | 9 | i | 1:52.95 | 100 | 10 |
| 2nd place, silver medalist(s) | Ireen Wüst | (Netherlands) | 10 | i | 1:53.30 | 80 | 8 |
| 3rd place, bronze medalist(s) | Martina Sáblíková | (Czech Republic) | 6 | o | 1:54.44 | 70 | 7 |
| 4 | Marrit Leenstra | (Netherlands) | 10 | o | 1:54.59 | 60 | 6 |
| 5 | Yekaterina Lobysheva | (Russia) | 7 | o | 1:54.66 | 50 | 5 |
| 6 | Ida Njåtun | (Norway) | 5 | o | 1:55.17 | 45 | — |
| 7 | Christine Nesbitt | (Canada) | 9 | o | 1:55.18 | 40 | |
| 8 | Claudia Pechstein | (Germany) | 1 | o | 1:55.22 | 36 | |
| 9 | Yuliya Skokova | (Russia) | 8 | i | 1:55.27 | 32 | |
| 10 | Yekaterina Shikhova | (Russia) | 1 | i | 1:55.30 | 28 | |
| 11 | Katarzyna Bachleda-Curuś | (Poland) | 6 | i | 1:55.44 | 24 | |
| 12 | Monique Angermüller | (Germany) | 3 | i | 1:55.46 | 21 | |
| 13 | Jorien Voorhuis | (Netherlands) | 8 | o | 1:55.54 | 18 | |
| 14 | Luiza Złotkowska | (Poland) | 4 | o | 1:55.63 | 16 | |
| 15 | Kali Christ | (Canada) | 5 | i | 1:56.39 | 14 | |
| 16 | Olga Graf | (Russia) | 2 | o | 1:56.41 | 12 | |
| 17 | Ayaka Kikuchi | (Japan) | 2 | i | 1:56.55 | 10 | |
| 18 | Brittany Schussler | (Canada) | 4 | i | 1:56.62 | 8 | |
| 19 | Annouk van der Weijden | (Netherlands) | 7 | i | 1:56.75 | 6 | |
| 20 | Kim Bo-reum | (South Korea) | 3 | o | 1:56.94 | 5 | |

=== Division B ===
| Rank | Name | Nat. | Pair | Lane | Time | WC points |
|---|---|---|---|---|---|---|
| 1 | Heather Richardson | (United States) | 12 | i | 1:53.37 | 25 |
| 2 | Brittany Bowe | (United States) | 14 | i | 1:53.75 | 19 |
| 3 | Maki Tabata | (Japan) | 13 | o | 1:56.06 | 15 |
| 4 | Nana Takagi | (Japan) | 12 | o | 1:56.39 | 11 |
| 5 | Gabriele Hirschbichler | (Germany) | 8 | o | 1:56.780 | 8 |
| 6 | Karolína Erbanová | (Czech Republic) | 15 | o | 1:56.784 | 6 |
| 7 | Noh Seon-yeong | (South Korea) | 4 | i | 1:56.855 | 4 |
| 8 | Nao Kodaira | (Japan) | 9 | i | 1:56.856 | 2 |
| 9 | Jilleanne Rookard | (United States) | 5 | o | 1:57.23 | 1 |
| 10 | Natalia Czerwonka | (Poland) | 16 | o | 1:57.62 | — |
| 11 | Yang Shin-young | (South Korea) | 2 | i | 1:57.81 | |
| 12 | Zhao Xin | (China) | 7 | i | 1:57.99 | |
| 13 | Yuki Matsuda | (Japan) | 9 | o | 1:58.05 | |
| 14 | Yekaterina Aydova | (Kazakhstan) | 10 | o | 1:58.14 | |
| 15 | Francesca Bettrone | (Italy) | 3 | i | 1:58.62 | |
| 16 | Brianne Tutt | (Canada) | 15 | i | 1:58.65 | |
| 17 | Jelena Peeters | (Belgium) | 13 | i | 1:58.96 | |
| 18 | Katarzyna Woźniak | (Poland) | 5 | i | 1:59.10 | |
| 19 | Hege Bøkko | (Norway) | 11 | i | 1:59.12 | |
| 20 | Anna Rokita | (Austria) | 6 | o | 1:59.47 | |
| 21 | Kelly Gunther | (United States) | 4 | o | 1:59.79 | |
| 22 | Kaitlyn McGregor | (Switzerland) | 1 | i | 2:00.21 | |
| 23 | Anna Chernova | (Russia) | 14 | o | 2:00.34 | |
| 24 | Josie Spence | (Canada) | 10 | i | 2:00.45 | |
| 25 | Mari Hemmer | (Norway) | 16 | i | 2:00.49 | |
| 26 | Tatyana Mikhailova | (Belarus) | 2 | o | 2:00.59 | |
| 27 | Ji Jia | (China) | 11 | o | 2:00.96 | |
| 28 | Johanna Östlund | (Sweden) | 7 | o | 2:01.08 | |
| 29 | Tatyana Sokirko | (Kazakhstan) | 8 | i | 2:01.42 | |
| 30 | Nikola Zdráhalová | (Czech Republic) | 3 | o | 2:03.22 | |
| DQ | Camilla Farestveit | (Norway) | 6 | i | DQ | |
