= 2013–14 ISU Speed Skating World Cup – World Cup 1 – Men's 1000 metres =

The men's 1000 metres race of the 2013–14 ISU Speed Skating World Cup 1, arranged in the Olympic Oval, in Calgary, Alberta, Canada, was held on 9 November 2013.

Shani Davis of the United States won, while Kjeld Nuis of the Netherlands came second, and Brian Hansen of the United States came third. Yevgeny Lalenkov of Russia won Division B.

== Results ==
The race took place on Saturday, 9 November, with Division A scheduled in the morning session, at 11:30, and Division B scheduled in the afternoon session, at 16:18.

=== Division A ===
Rank	Name	Nat.	Pair	Lane	Time	WC points	GWC points
1st place, gold medalist(s)	Shani Davis	(United States)	10	o	1:07.46	100	10
2nd place, silver medalist(s)	Kjeld Nuis	(Netherlands)	10	i	1:07.57	80	8
3rd place, bronze medalist(s)	Brian Hansen	(United States)	3	o	1:07.64	70	7
4	Denis Kuzin	(Kazakhstan)	5	o	1:07.715	60	6
5	Koen Verweij	(Netherlands)	9	o	1:07.719	50	5
6	Mo Tae-bum	(South Korea)	4	i	1:07.92	45	—
7	Jamie Gregg	(Canada)	8	i	1:07.95	40	
8	Samuel Schwarz	(Germany)	9	i	1:08.11	36	
9	Michel Mulder	(Netherlands)	6	i	1:08.21	32	
10	Stefan Groothuis	(Netherlands)	7	o	1:08.24	28	
11	Denny Morrison	(Canada)	7	i	1:08.39	24	
12	Sjoerd de Vries	(Netherlands)	8	o	1:08.52	21	
13	Aleksey Yesin	(Russia)	5	i	1:08.78	18	
14	Daniel Greig	(Australia)	1	i	1:08.86	16	
15	Mika Poutala	(Finland)	1	o	1:09.15	14	
16	Pekka Koskela	(Finland)	6	o	1:09.27	12	
17	Dmitry Lobkov	(Russia)	2	i	1:09.40	10	
18	Lee Kyou-hyuk	(South Korea)	4	o	1:09.62	8	
19	Denis Dressel	(Germany)	3	i	1:10.27	6	
20	William Dutton	(Canada)	2	o	DNF	0	

=== Division B ===
Rank	Name	Nat.	Pair	Lane	Time	WC points
1	Yevgeny Lalenkov	(Russia)	11	i	1:08.02	25
2	Mirko Giacomo Nenzi	(Italy)	15	i	1:08.19	19
3	Mitchell Whitmore	(United States)	8	i	1:08.39	15
4	Trevor Marsicano	(United States)	2	i	1:08.42	11
5	Nico Ihle	(Germany)	6	o	1:08.61	8
6	Tyler Derraugh	(Canada)	12	o	1:08.73	6
7	Gilmore Junio	(Canada)	14	o	1:08.80	4
8	Håvard Holmefjord Lorentzen	(Norway)	18	i	1:08.82	2
9	Konrad Niedźwiedzki	(Poland)	13	o	1:08.92	1
10	Haralds Silovs	(Latvia)	19	i	1:08.93	—
11	Joey Mantia	(United States)	18	o	1:09.02	
12	Zbigniew Bródka	(Poland)	14	i	1:09.08	
13	Christoffer Fagerli Rukke	(Norway)	3	i	1:09.14	
14	Fyodor Mezentsev	(Kazakhstan)	17	o	1:09.27	
15	Benjamin Macé	(France)	13	i	1:09.357	
16	Kim Tae-jun	(South Korea)	16	o	1:09.359	
17	Håvard Bøkko	(Norway)	19	o	1:09.51	
18	Aleksandr Zhigin	(Kazakhstan)	17	i	1:09.56	
19	Tian Guojun	(China)	10	i	1:09.62	
20	Igor Bogolubsky	(Russia)	16	i	1:09.65	
21	Denis Koval	(Russia)	4	i	1:09.82	
22	Sung Ching-Yang	(Chinese Taipei)	7	i	1:09.83	
23	David Andersson	(Sweden)	1	i	1:09.89	
24	Lee Kang-seok	(South Korea)	4	o	1:09.94	
25	Jan Daldossi	(Italy)	3	o	1:09.99	
26	Bart Swings	(Belgium)	5	i	1:10.00	
27	Daichi Yamanaka	(Japan)	8	o	1:10.15	
28	Taro Kondo	(Japan)	2	o	1:10.31	
29	Tommi Pulli	(Finland)	12	i	1:10.64	
30	Armin Hager	(Austria)	10	o	1:10.73	
31	Sung Longjiang	(China)	15	o	1:10.85	
32	Vitaly Mikhailov	(Belarus)	7	o	1:10.92	
33	Marius Christian Paraschivoiu	(Romania)	9	o	1:10.94	
34	Joel Vähä-Salo	(Finland)	9	i	1:10.98	
35	Mark Jackson	(New Zealand)	11	o	1:11.22	
36	Darsil Essamambo	(Kazakhstan)	5	o	1:11.61	
37	Matoko Owada	(Japan)	6	i	1:28.10	
