= 2013–14 ISU Speed Skating World Cup – World Cup 1 – Women's 3000 metres =

The women's 3000 metres race of the 2013–14 ISU Speed Skating World Cup 1, arranged in the Olympic Oval, in Calgary, Alberta, Canada, was held on 8 November 2013.

Claudia Pechstein of Germany won, while Martina Sáblíková of the Czech Republic came second, and Ireen Wüst of the Netherlands came third. Antoinette de Jong of the Netherlands set a new world record for juniors with a time of 4:00.46. Luiza Złotkowska of Poland won Division B.

== Results ==
The race took place on Friday, 8 November, with Division A scheduled in the morning session, at 12:09, and Division B scheduled in the afternoon session, at 17:51.

=== Division A ===
Rank	Name	Nat.	Pair	Lane	Time	WC points	GWC points
1st place, gold medalist(s)	Claudia Pechstein	(Germany)	7	o	3:59.04	100	10
2nd place, silver medalist(s)	Martina Sáblíková	(Czech Republic)	8	o	3:59.39	80	8
3rd place, bronze medalist(s)	Ireen Wüst	(Netherlands)	7	i	3:59.68	70	7
4	Antoinette de Jong	(Netherlands)	5	i	4:00.56	60	6
5	Jorien Voorhuis	(Netherlands)	5	o	4:01.09	50	5
6	Yvonne Nauta	(Netherlands)	6	o	4:03.50	45	—
7	Ida Njåtun	(Norway)	2	o	4:04.67	40	
8	Katarzyna Bachleda-Curuś	(Poland)	4	i	4:05.18	35	
9	Linda de Vries	(Netherlands)	2	i	4:05.24	30	
10	Nana Takagi	(Japan)	3	o	4:06.00	25	
11	Olga Graf	(Russia)	6	i	4:06.01	21	
12	Kim Bo-reum	(South Korea)	4	o	4:07.93	18	
13	Brittany Schussler	(Canada)	1	o	4:08.06	16	
14	Yuliya Skokova	(Russia)	3	i	4:08.42	14	
15	Stephanie Beckert	(Germany)	8	i	4:09.24	12	
16	Ivanie Blondin	(Canada)	1	i	4:13.42	10	

=== Division B ===
Rank	Name	Nat.	Pair	Lane	Time	WC points
1	Luiza Złotkowska	(Poland)	11	o	4:03.68	32
2	Shiho Ishizawa	(Japan)	14	o	4:04.30	27
3	Masako Hozumi	(Japan)	12	o	4:04.74	23
4	Katarzyna Woźniak	(Poland)	5	o	4:04.82	19
5	Jilleanne Rookard	(United States)	16	o	4:05.84	15
6	Jennifer Bay	(Germany)	10	o	4:06.02	11
7	Ayaka Kikuchi	(Japan)	19	i	4:06.27	9
8	Bente Kraus	(Germany)	17	o	4:06.30	7
9	Natalia Czerwonka	(Poland)	19	o	4:06.38	6
10	Jelena Peeters	(Belgium)	18	i	4:07.34	5
11	Francesca Lollobrigida	(Italy)	6	i	4:07.47	4
12	Anna Chernova	(Russia)	15	o	4:08.34	3
13	Miho Takagi	(Japan)	13	o	4:08.49	2
14	Anna Rokita	(Austria)	14	i	4:08.51	1
15	Noh Seon-yeong	(South Korea)	8	i	4:08.71	—
16	Mari Hemmer	(Norway)	18	o	4:09.54	
16	Yang Shin-young	(South Korea)	7	o	4:09.54	
18	Viktoriya Filyushkina	(Russia)	12	i	4:09.98	
19	Nicole Garrido	(Canada)	2	o	4:10.14	
20	Park Do-yeong	(South Korea)	16	i	4:10.25	
21	Brianne Tutt	(Canada)	15	i	4:10.54	
22	Camilla Farestveit	(Norway)	7	i	4:12.22	
23	Lada Zadonskaya	(Russia)	10	i	4:12.78	
24	Petra Acker	(United States)	13	i	4:13.05	
25	Yelena Urvantseva	(Kazakhstan)	9	o	4:13.14	
26	Jun Ye-jin	(South Korea)	5	i	4:13.42	
27	Isabell Ost	(Germany)	11	i	4:13.90	
28	Anna Ringsred	(United States)	6	o	4:13.92	
29	Daniela Oltean	(Romania)	4	o	4:15.37	
30	Liu Jing	(China)	1	i	4:16.12	
31	Johanna Östlund	(Sweden)	8	o	4:18.63	
32	Tatyana Mikhailova	(Belarus)	3	i	4:18.72	
33	Sara Bak-Briand	(Denmark)	4	i	4:18.89	
34	Saskia Alusalu	(Estonia)	3	o	4:20.12	
35	Nikola Zdráhalová	(Czech Republic)	9	i	4:20.20	
36	Lauren McGuire	(Canada)	17	i	4:21.41	
37	Brooke Lochland	(Australia)	2	i	4:23.54	
