= 2013–14 ISU Speed Skating World Cup – World Cup 1 – Men's 1500 metres =

The men's 1500 metres race of the 2013–14 ISU Speed Skating World Cup 1, arranged in the Olympic Oval, in Calgary, Alberta, Canada, was held on 8 November 2013.

Koen Verweij of the Netherlands won, while Shani Davis of the United States came third, and Kjeld Nuis of the Netherlands came third. Brian Hansen of the United States won Division B.

== Results ==
The race took place on Friday, 8 November, with Division A scheduled in the morning session, at 13:13, and Division B scheduled in the afternoon session, at 16:39.

=== Division A ===
Rank	Name	Nat.	Pair	Lane	Time	WC points	GWC points
1st place, gold medalist(s)	Koen Verweij	(Netherlands)	6	i	1:42.78	100	10
2nd place, silver medalist(s)	Shani Davis	(United States)	8	i	1:43.11	80	8
3rd place, bronze medalist(s)	Kjeld Nuis	(Netherlands)	6	o	1:43.75	70	7
4	Ivan Skobrev	(Russia)	5	i	1:43.77	60	6
5	Alexis Contin	(France)	4	i	1:44.05	50	5
8	Sverre Lunde Pedersen	(Norway)	7	i	1:44.13	45	—
7	Konrad Niedźwiedzki	(Poland)	7	o	1:44.19	40	
8	Zbigniew Bródka	(Poland)	9	i	1:44.27	36	
9	Rhian Ket	(Netherlands)	5	o	1:44.29	32	
10	Mark Tuitert	(Netherlands)	3	o	1:44.39	28	
11	Denny Morrison	(Canada)	1	o	1:44.42	24	
12	Håvard Bøkko	(Norway)	9	o	1:44.556	21	
13	Aleksey Yesin	(Russia)	2	i	1:44.558	18	
14	Jan Szymański	(Poland)	4	o	1:44.58	16	
15	Denis Yuskov	(Russia)	10	i	1:45.05	14	
16	Benjamin Macé	(France)	1	i	1:45.60	12	
17	Lucas Makowsky	(Canada)	2	o	1:45.68	10	
18	Haralds Silovs	(Latvia)	3	i	1:46.21	8	
19	Joey Mantia	(United States)	8	o	1:46.28	6	
DQ	Bart Swings	(Belgium)	10	o	DQ	—	

=== Division B ===
Rank	Name	Nat.	Pair	Lane	Time	WC points
1	Brian Hansen	(United States)	16	i	1:43.32	25
2	Trevor Marsicano	(United States)	14	o	1:43.83	19
3	Denis Kuzin	(Kazakhstan)	18	o	1:44.44	15
4	Yevgeny Lalenkov	(Poland)	9	i	1:44.81	11
5	Håvard Holmefjord Lorentzen	(Netherlands)	13	o	1:44.86	8
6	Dmitry Babenko	(Russia)	12	i	1:44.96	6
7	Jonathan Kuck	(United States)	3	o	1:45.41	4
8	Mathieu Giroux	(Canada)	14	i	1:45.74	2
9	Mirko Giacomo Nenzi	(Italy)	16	o	1:45.90	1
10	Bram Smallenbroek	(Austria)	1	i	1:45.99	
11	Joo Hyong-jun	(South Korea)	9	o	1:46.07	
12	David Andersson	(Sweden)	12	o	1:46.14	
13	Wouter olde Heuvel	(Netherlands)	18	i	1:46.18	
14	Sergey Gryaztsov	(Russia)	11	i	1:46.29	
15	Aleksandr Zhigin	(Kazakhstan)	1	o	1:46.54	
16	Kim Cheol-min	(South Korea)	15	o	1:46.62	
17	Vincent De Haître	(Canada)	7	i	1:46.63	
18	Shota Nakamura	(Japan)	4	i	1:46.66	
19	Taro Kondo	(Japan)	8	i	1:46.67	
20	Simon Spieler Nilsen	(Norway)	10	i	1:46.68	
21	Konrád Nagy	(Hungary)	5	i	1:46.70	
22	Richard Maclennan	(Canada)	17	o	1:46.91	
23	Matteo Anesi	(Italy)	13	i	1:46.98	
24	Fyodor Mezentsev	(Kazakhstan)	15	i	1:47.05	
25	Tian Guojun	(China)	3	i	1:47.21	
26	Christoffer Fagerli Rukke	(Norway)	11	o	1:47.60	
27	Vitaly Mikhailov	(Belarus)	2	o	1:47.75	
28	Moritz Geisreiter	(Germany)	17	i	1:47.89	
29	Joel Vähä-Salo	(Finland)	7	o	1:48.12	
30	Alexej Baumgärtner	(Germany)	6	o	1:48.25	
31	Ewen Fernandez	(France)	10	o	1:48.38	
32	Jan Daldossi	(Italy)	2	i	1:48.54	
33	Maciej Biega	(Poland)	6	i	1:48.67	
34	Darren Ta-Yuan Huang	(Chinese Taipei)	8	o	1:48.86	
35	Kalon Dobbin	(New Zealand)	5	o	1:50.54	
36	Galbaatar Uuganbaatar	(Mongolia)	4	o	1:52.44	
