= 2013–14 ISU Speed Skating World Cup – World Cup 1 =

The first competition weekend of the 2013–14 ISU Speed Skating World Cup was held in the Olympic Oval in Calgary, Alberta, Canada, from Friday, 8 November, until Sunday, 10 November 2013.

Two new world records were set during the weekend. On Saturday, Lee Sang-hwa of South Korea improved her own world record on 500 metres with a time of 36.74 seconds. A couple of hours later, the Dutch men's team – comprised by Koen Verweij, Jan Blokhuijsen and Sven Kramer – improved the team pursuit world record to 3:37.17.

There were also two world records for juniors; in the women's 3000 metres race on Friday, Antoinette de Jong of the Netherlands set a new world records for girls with a time of 4:00.56, and on Sunday, Kim Hyun-yung of South Korea did the same in the 1000 metres distance, with a time of 1:15.18.

== Schedule ==
The detailed schedule of events:

Date	Session	Events	Comment
Friday, 8 November	Morning	11:00: 500 m women (1); 11:25: 500 m men (1); 12:09: 3000 m women 13:13: 1500 m men	Division A
Friday, 8 November	Afternoon	14:55: 500 m men (1); 15:49: 500 m women (1); 16:39: 1500 m men 17:51: 3000 m women	Division B
Saturday, 9 November	Morning	11:00: 500 m women (2); 11:30: 1000 m men 12:19: 1500 m women	Division A
Saturday, 9 November	Morning	13:17: Team pursuit men	
Saturday, 9 November	Afternoon	15:30: 500 m women (2); 16:18: 1000 m men 17:26: 1500 m women	Division B
Sunday, 10 November	Morning	11:00: 500 m men (2); 11:30: 1000 m women 12:20: 5000 m men	Division A
Sunday, 10 November	Morning	13:52: Team pursuit women	
Sunday, 10 November	Afternoon	15:20: 500 m men (2); 16:26: 1000 m women 17:25: 5000 m men	Division B

All times are MST (UTC−7).

== Medal summary ==
=== Men's events ===
Event	Race #	Gold	Time	Silver	Time	Bronze	Time	Report
500 m	1	Ronald Mulder; Netherlands	34.41	Mo Tae-bum; South Korea	34.523	Jamie Gregg; Canada	34.526	
500 m	2	Tucker Fredricks; United States	34.46	Mo Tae-bum; South Korea	34.47	Jamie Gregg; Canada; Ronald Mulder; Netherlands	34.529	
1000 m		Shani Davis; United States	1:07.46	Kjeld Nuis; Netherlands	1:07.57	Brian Hansen; United States	1:07.64	
1500 m		Koen Verweij; Netherlands	1:42.78	Shani Davis; United States	1:43.11	Kjeld Nuis; Netherlands	1:43.75	
5000 m		Sven Kramer; Netherlands	6:04.46	Jorrit Bergsma; Netherlands	6:06.93	Lee Seung-hoon; South Korea	6:07.04	
Team pursuit		Netherlands; Koen Verweij; Jan Blokhuijsen; Sven Kramer	3:37.17; WR	United States; Brian Hansen; Jonathan Kuck; Trevor Marsicano	3:38.66	South Korea; Lee Seung-hoon; Joo Hyong-jun; Kim Cheol-min	3:40.53	

=== Women's events ===
Event	Race #	Gold	Time	Silver	Time	Bronze	Time	Report
500 m	1	Lee Sang-hwa; South Korea	36.91	Jenny Wolf; Germany	37.14	Wang Beixing; China	37.40	
500 m	2	Lee Sang-hwa; South Korea	36.74; WR	Jenny Wolf; Germany	37.18	Wang Beixing; China	37.30	
1000 m		Heather Richardson; United States	1:13.23	Lotte van Beek; Netherlands	1:13.36	Brittany Bowe; United States	1:13.70	
1500 m		Lotte van Beek; Netherlands	1:52.95	Ireen Wüst; Netherlands	1:53.30	Martina Sáblíková; Czech Republic	1:54.44	
3000 m		Claudia Pechstein; Germany	3:59.04	Martina Sáblíková; Czech Republic	3:59.39	Ireen Wüst; Netherlands	3:59.68	
Team pursuit		Netherlands; Ireen Wüst; Lotte van Beek; Linda de Vries	2:57.82	Japan; Nana Takagi; Maki Tabata; Ayaka Kikuchi	2:58.53	Poland; Katarzyna Bachleda-Curuś; Luiza Złotkowska; Katarzyna Woźniak	2:59.42	

== Standings ==
The top ten standings in the contested cups after the weekend. The top five nations in the team pursuit cups.

=== Men's cups ===
500 m

#	Name	Nat.	CAL1	CAL2	Total
1	Ronald Mulder	(Netherlands)	100	70	170
2	Mo Tae-bum	(South Korea)	80	80	160
3	Jamie Gregg	(Canada)	70	70	140
4	Tucker Fredricks	(United States)	25	100	125
5	Michel Mulder	(Netherlands)	60	32	92
6	Jesper Hospes	(Netherlands)	45	45	90
7	Mitchell Whitmore	(United States)	36	50	86
8	Jan Smeekens	(Netherlands)	40	40	80
9	Artyom Kuznetsov	(Russia)	50	14	64
10	Ryohei Haga	(Japan)	24	28	52

1000 m

#	Name	Nat.	CAL	Total
1	Shani Davis	(United States)	100	100
2	Kjeld Nuis	(Netherlands)	80	80
3	Brian Hansen	(United States)	70	70
4	Denis Kuzin	(Kazakhstan)	60	60
5	Koen Verweij	(Netherlands)	50	50
6	Mo Tae-bum	(South Korea)	45	45
7	Jamie Gregg	(Canada)	40	40
8	Samuel Schwarz	(Germany)	36	36
9	Michel Mulder	(Netherlands)	32	32
10	Stefan Groothuis	(Netherlands)	28	28

1500 m

#	Name	Nat.	CAL	Total
1	Koen Verweij	(Netherlands)	100	100
2	Shani Davis	(United States)	80	80
3	Kjeld Nuis	(Netherlands)	70	70
4	Ivan Skobrev	(Russia)	60	60
5	Alexis Contin	(Netherlands)	50	50
6	Sverre Lunde Pedersen	(Norway)	45	45
7	Konrad Niedźwiedzki	(Poland)	40	40
8	Zbigniew Bródka	(Poland)	36	36
9	Rhian Ket	(Netherlands)	32	32
10	Mark Tuitert	(Netherlands)	28	28

5000/10000 m

#	Name	Nat.	CAL	Total
1	Sven Kramer	(Netherlands)	100	100
2	Jorrit Bergsma	(Netherlands)	80	80
3	Lee Seung-hoon	(South Korea)	70	70
4	Bob de Jong	(Netherlands)	60	60
5	Koen Verweij	(Netherlands)	50	50
6	Jan Blokhuijsen	(Netherlands)	45	45
7	Moritz Geisreiter	(Germany)	40	40
8	Sverre Lunde Pedersen	(Norway)	35	35
9	Jonathan Kuck	(United States)	32	32
10	Patrick Beckert	(Germany)	30	30

Team pursuit

#	Country	CAL	Total
1	Netherlands	100	100
2	United States	80	80
3	South Korea	70	70
4	Canada	60	60
5	Poland	50	50

Grand World Cup

#	Name	Nat.	CAL	Total
1	Koen Verweij	(Netherlands)	20	20
2	Shani Davis	(United States)	18	18
3	Kjeld Nuis	(Netherlands)	15	15
4	Sven Kramer	(Netherlands)	10	10
5	Ronald Mulder	(Netherlands)	8.5	8.5
6	Jorrit Bergsma	(Netherlands)	8	8
6	Mo Tae-bum	(South Korea)	8	8
8	Jamie Gregg	(Canada)	7	7
8	Brian Hansen	(United States)	7	7
8	Lee Seung-hoon	(South Korea)	7	7

=== Women's cups ===
500 m

#	Name	Nat.	CAL1	CAL2	Total
1	Lee Sang-hwa	(South Korea)	100	100	200
2	Jenny Wolf	(Germany)	80	80	160
3	Wang Beixing	(China)	70	70	140
4	Margot Boer	(Netherlands)	40	60	100
5	Heather Richardson	(United States)	50	50	100
6	Nao Kodaira	(Japan)	60	36	96
7	Olga Fatkulina	(Russia)	45	45	90
8	Judith Hesse	(Germany)	36	32	68
9	Yu Jing	(China)	24	40	64
10	Brittany Bowe	(United States)	32	28	60

1000 m

#	Name	Nat.	CAL	Total
1	Heather Richardson	(United States)	100	100
2	Lotte van Beek	(Netherlands)	80	80
3	Brittany Bowe	(United States)	70	70
4	Lee Sang-hwa	(South Korea)	60	60
5	Olga Fatkulina	(Russia)	50	50
6	Margot Boer	(Netherlands)	45	45
7	Ireen Wüst	(Netherlands)	40	40
8	Wang Beixing	(China)	36	36
9	Judith Hesse	(Germany)	32	32
10	Christine Nesbitt	(Canada)	28	28

1500 m

#	Name	Nat.	CAL	Total
1	Lotte van Beek	(Netherlands)	100	100
2	Ireen Wüst	(Netherlands)	80	80
3	Martina Sáblíková	(Czech Republic)	70	70
4	Marrit Leenstra	(Netherlands)	60	60
5	Yekaterina Lobysheva	(Russia)	50	50
6	Ida Njåtun	(Norway)	45	45
7	Christine Nesbitt	(Canada)	40	40
8	Claudia Pechstein	(Germany)	36	36
9	Yuliya Skokova	(Russia)	32	32
10	Yekaterina Shikhova	(Russia)	28	28

3000/5000 m

#	Name	Nat.	CAL	Total
1	Claudia Pechstein	(Germany)	100	100
2	Martina Sáblíková	(Czech Republic)	80	80
3	Ireen Wüst	(Netherlands)	70	70
4	Antoinette de Jong	(Netherlands)	60	60
5	Jorien Voorhuis	(Netherlands)	50	50
6	Yvonne Nauta	(Netherlands)	45	45
7	Ida Njåtun	(Norway)	40	40
8	Katarzyna Bachleda-Curuś	(Poland)	35	35
9	Luiza Złotkowska	(Poland)	32	32
10	Linda de Vries	(Netherlands)	30	30

Team pursuit

#	Country	CAL	Total
1	Netherlands	100	100
2	Japan	80	80
3	Poland	70	70
4	Canada	60	60
5	South Korea	50	50

Grand World Cup

#	Name	Nat.	CAL	Total
1	Lotte van Beek	(Netherlands)	18	18
2	Lee Sang-hwa	(South Korea)	16	16
3	Heather Richardson	(United States)	15	15
3	Martina Sáblíková	(Czech Republic)	15	15
3	Ireen Wüst	(Netherlands)	15	15
6	Claudia Pechstein	(Germany)	10	10
7	Jenny Wolf	(Germany)	8	8
8	Brittany Bowe	(United States)	7	7
8	Wang Beixing	(China)	7	7
10	Antoinette de Jong	(Netherlands)	6	6
10	Marrit Leenstra	(Netherlands)	6	6
