= Danielle Wotherspoon-Gregg =

Canadian speed skater

Personal information
- Born: April 13, 1980 (age 45) Red Deer, Alberta
- Height: 1.76 m (5 ft 9 in)
- Weight: 63 kg (139 lb; 9.9 st)

Sport
- Country: Canada
- Sport: Speed skating

Danielle Wotherspoon-Gregg (born April 13, 1980) is a Canadian speedskater from Red Deer, Alberta. She primarily competes in the short distances of 500 m and 1000 m. Wotherspoon-Gregg qualified to compete at the 2014 Olympic Games as part of the Canadian team, competing in the 500 m event. She is the sister of Canadian speed skater Jeremy Wotherspoon and is married to her teammate and former 500 m speed skater Jamie Gregg, who has been retired since June 1, 2013. Together, they have three sons. Her sister is international speed skater Sarah Gregg.
