= Elli Ochowicz =

American speed skater

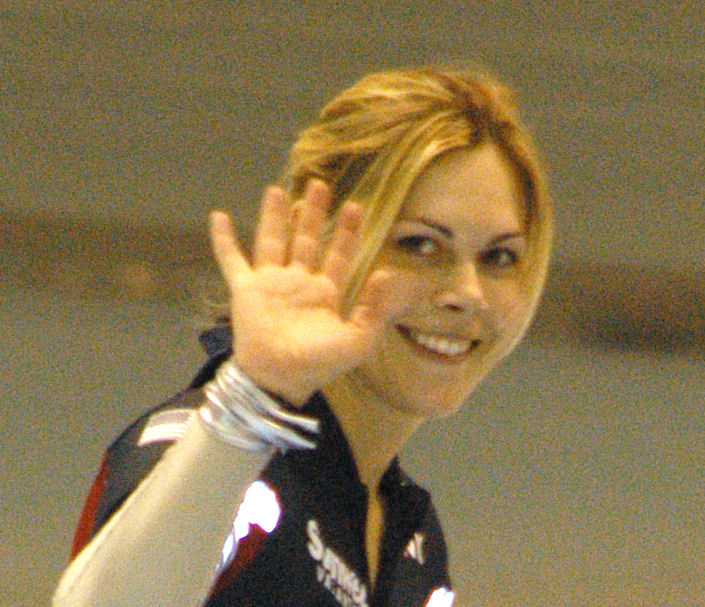
- Ochowicz in February 2008

Personal information
- Born: Elizabeth Kristine Ochowicz; December 15, 1983 (age 42) Waukesha, Wisconsin
- Height: 5 ft 3 in (160 cm)

Sport
- Country: United States
- Sport: Speed skating

Elizabeth Kristine "Elli" Ochowicz (born December 15, 1983) is an Olympic speed skater who has competed in the three Winter Olympics.

Ochowicz was born in Waukesha, Wisconsin, to Jim Ochowicz and Sheila Young. After beginning her training in the Milwaukee area, she moved to Salt Lake City to continue training. She graduated from The Winter Sports School in Park City in fall 2002.

Ochowicz competed in the 2002, 2006 and 2010 Winter Olympics. As of 2010, she lived in Palo Alto, California.

== Personal records ==
Personal records
Women's speed skating
Event	Result	Date	Location	Notes
500 m	37.74	December 11, 2009	Utah Olympic Oval, Salt Lake City	
1000 m	1:14.97	December 13, 2009	Utah Olympic Oval, Salt Lake City	
1500 m	2:00.33	December 29, 2009	Utah Olympic Oval, Salt Lake City	
3000 m	4:25.88	September 22, 2012	Utah Olympic Oval, Salt Lake City	
5000 m	7:52.34	December 31, 2012	Utah Olympic Oval, Salt Lake City	
