= Yekaterina Malysheva =

Russian speed skater

Yekaterina Aleksandrovna Malysheva (Russian: Екатерина Александровна Малышева, born 28 January 1987 in Chelyabinsk, Soviet Union) is a Russian speed skater. She competed at the 2010 Winter Olympics in Vancouver, and at the 2014 Winter Olympics in Sochi.
