= Lauren Cholewinski =

American speed skater

Lauren Isaac (Cholewinski)
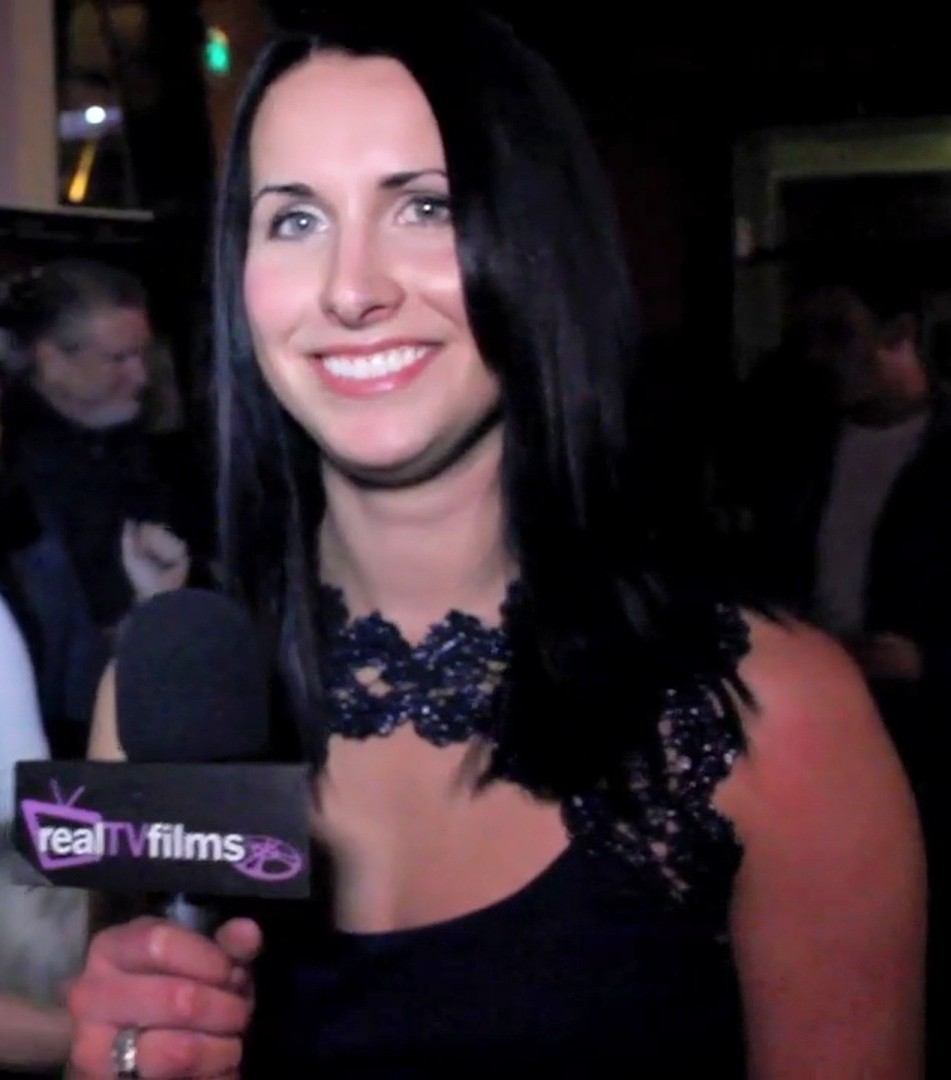
- Cholewinski in 2014

Personal information
- Born: 15 November 1988 (age 37) Pineville, North Carolina, U.S.
- Height: 5 ft 8 in (173 cm)
- Weight: 145 lb (66 kg)

Sport
- Country: USA
- Sport: Speed skating

Lauren Richards (Cholewinski) (born November 15, 1988, in Pineville, North Carolina) is an American speed skater who has competed since 2007. She grew up in Rock Hill, South Carolina, where she attended Northwestern High School and learned to skate at a roller rink called "Roller Magic". In 2006, her family moved to Salt Lake City, Utah for her to pursue a career in skating. She was named to the U.S. team for the 2010 and 2014 Winter Olympics. In addition to her skating, Isaac also models.

Richards is currently living is Salt Lake City, Utah with her 2 children.
