= Yuliya Liteykina =

Russian speed skater

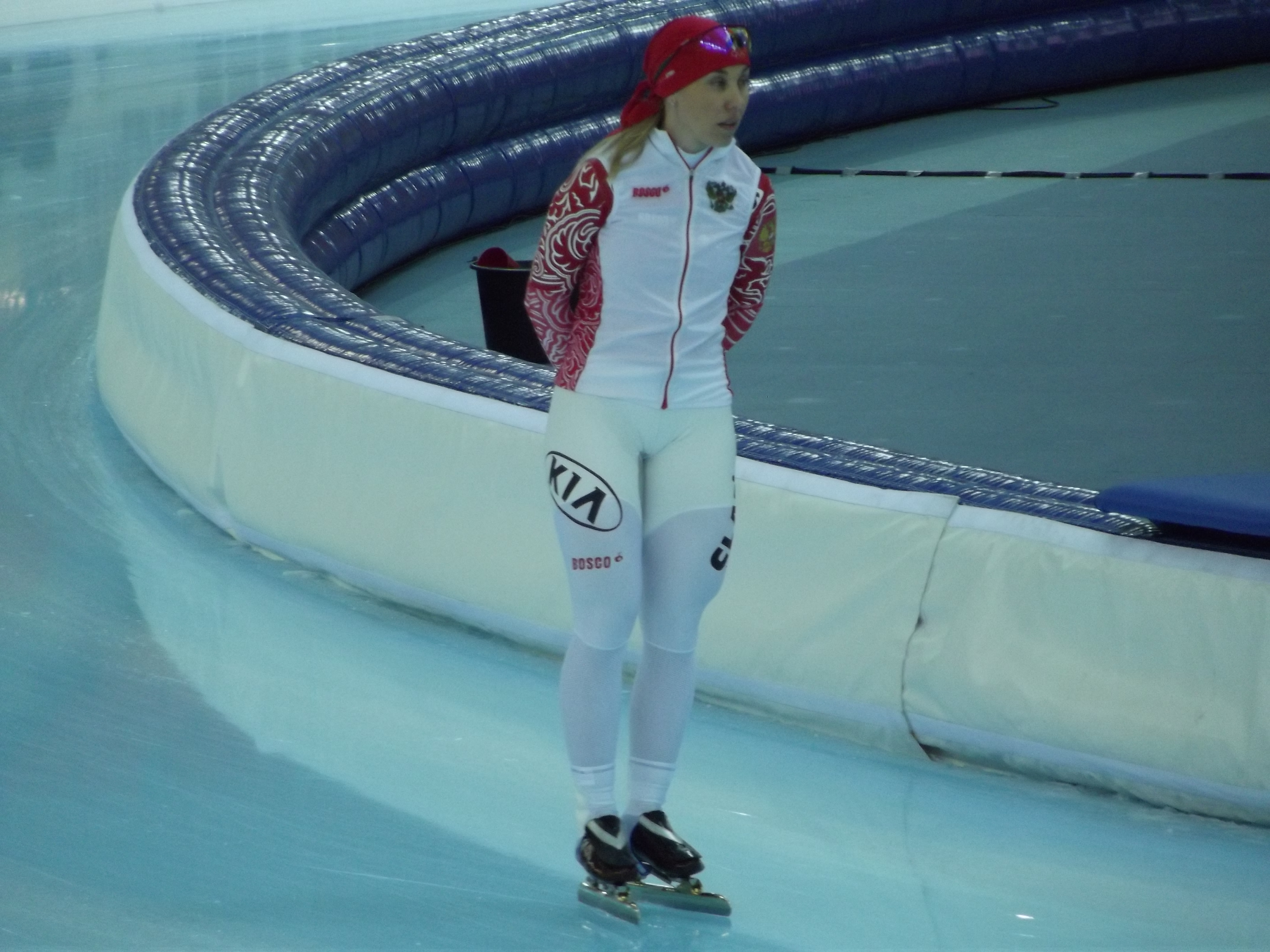
Yuliya Liteykina

Yuliya Aleksandrovna Liteykina (Russian: Юлия Александровна Литейкина) (née Nemaya; born 30 December 1977 in Khabarovsk, Russian SFSR) is a Russian speed skater who specialises in sprint.

== Personal records ==
Personal records
Women's speed skating
Event	Result	Date	Location	Notes
500 m	37.66	4 December 2009	Olympic Oval, Calgary	
1000 m	1:16.43	11 November 2007	Utah Olympic Oval, Salt Lake City	
1500 m	2:04.42	9 November 2006	Speed Skating Centre, Kolomna	
3000 m	5:08.18	27 November 2004	Nizhny Novgorod	
