= Kaylin Irvine =

Canadian speed skater

Personal information
- Born: September 3, 1990 (age 35) Calgary, Alberta
- Height: 1.71 m (5 ft 7 in)
- Weight: 78 kg (172 lb)

Sport
- Country: Canada
- Sport: Speed skating
- Club: Club Ichiban
Medal record
World Single Distances Championships
Silver medal – second place	2019 Inzell	Team sprint

Kaylin Irvine (born September 3, 1990) is a Canadian speed skater. She competes primarily in the short distance of 1000 m. Irvine qualified to compete at the 2014 Olympic Games as part of the Canadian team where she skated in the 1000 m event.

== Career ==
=== 2018 Winter Olympics ===
Irvine qualified to compete for Canada at the 2018 Winter Olympics.
