= Lee Bo-ra =

South Korean speed skater

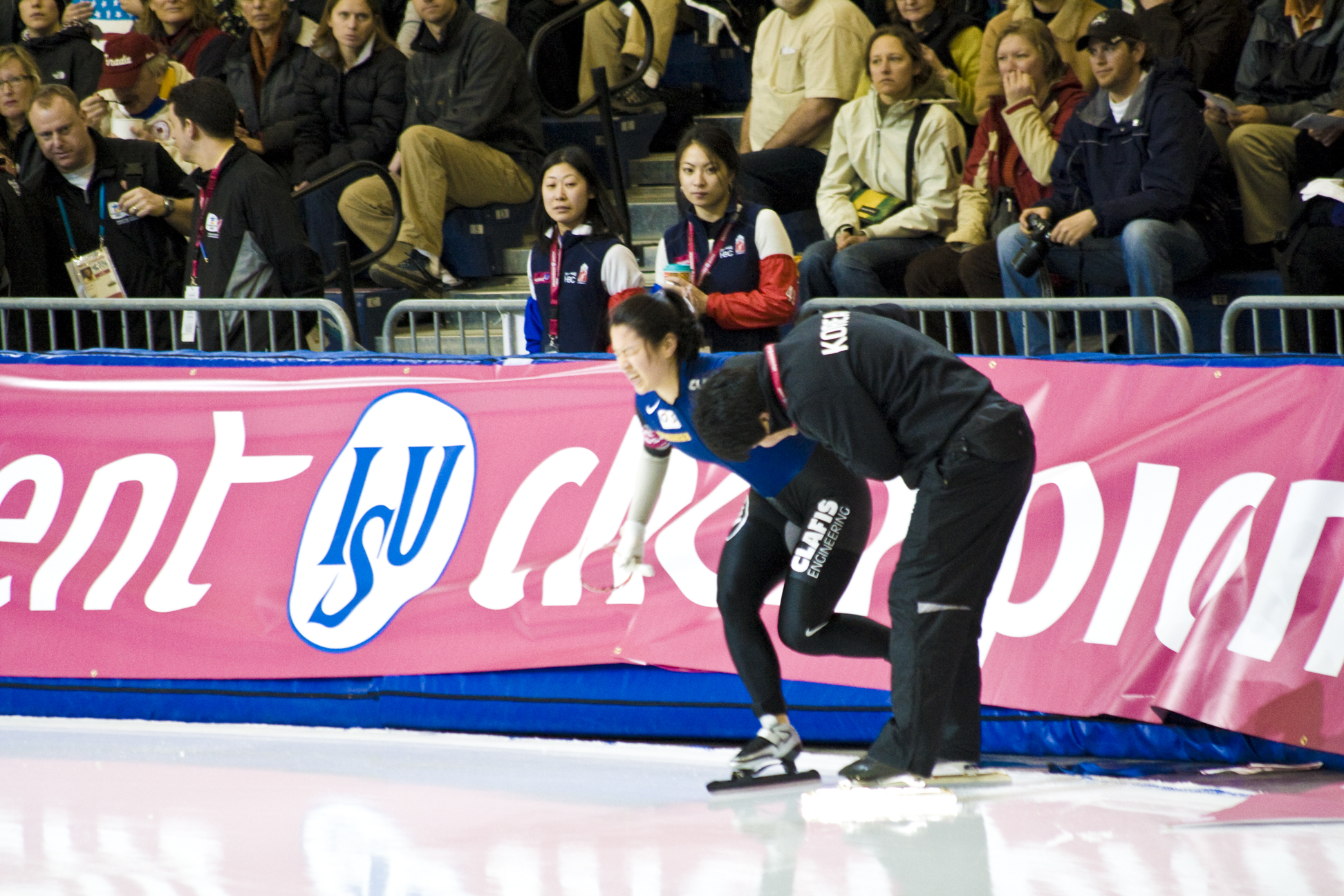
- Lee Bo-ra after her fall in the 500 meters at the 2009 World Single Distance Speed Skating Championships.

Personal information
- Born: 16 August 1986 (age 39) Chuncheon, Gangwon
- Height: 1.64 m (5 ft 5 in)
- Weight: 55 kg (121 lb)

Sport
- Country: South Korea
- Sport: Speed skating
- Club: Dongducheon City

Achievements and titles
- Personal bests: 500 m – 38.33; 1000 m – 1:16.80; 1500 m – 2:02.07; 3000 m – 4:25.79; 5000 m – 7:59.29

- Lee Bo-ra
- Hangul: 이보라
- RR: I Bora
- MR: I Pora

Lee Bo-ra (born 16 August 1986) is a South Korean female speed skater. She competed at the 2006 and 2010 Winter Olympics. In the 2006 Olympics, she placed 25th in 500 m and 34th in 1000 m. In the 2010 Olympics, she placed 26th in the 500 m.

She also competed at the 2007 and 2011 Asian Winter Games.

== Personal records ==
Personal records
Women's speed skating
Event	Result	Date	Location	Notes
500 m	38.33	10 November 2007	Salt Lake City	
1000 m	1:16.80	11 November 2007	Salt Lake City	
1500 m	2:02.07	20 September 2008	Calgary	
3000 m	4.25.79	14 November 1999	Calgary	
5000 m	7.59.29	21 December 2004	Seoul	
