= Alau Ice Palace =

Sports venue in Kazakhstan

- Interactive map of Alau Ice Palace
- Location: 47, Kabanbay Batyr ave. Astana, Kazakhstan
- Coordinates: 51°6′17″N 71°24′18″E
- Capacity: 8,000
- Surface: Ice

Construction
- Built: 2007–2011
- Opened: December 2011
- Architect: VL Architects
- General contractor: Sembol Construction

Tenants
- 2011 Asian Winter Games; 2015 World Sprint Speed Skating Championships; 2015 World Judo Championships

Website
- www.alau.info

The Alau Ice Palace (Kazakh: Алау Мұзайдыны сарайы; Alau Mūzaidyny Saraiy) is an 8,000-seat speed skating oval in Astana, Kazakhstan. It was ranked first among the world’s speed skating stadiums according to the Dutch AD Sportwereld publication’s ranking. As well as speed skating, it is also used for other sports and was opened in December 2011.

== Events ==
The center hosted the speed skating events at the 2011 Asian Winter Games. In 2015, it hosted the World Sprint Speed Skating Championships.

For judo it was the venue for the 2015 World Judo Championships in August 2015 and for ice speedway it hosted final 1 of the 2018 Individual Ice Racing World Championship.

It has also hosted national youth championships in rink bandy.

== History ==
Construction of The Oval began in 2007, nearly four years after Astana and Almaty had been designated hosts of the 2011 Asian Winter Games. Construction was completed by the end of the summer of 2011, officially opening in December 2011, two months before the beginning of the Games. The Alau Ice Palace was designed as the first covered speed skating oval in Kazakhstan, and as the second ever artificially frozen speed skating venue after Medeu. Being domed, this would give the facility the ability to control climate conditions inside to produce the highest quality ice possible.

The Alau is an artificially frozen indoor skating rink with a standard speed skating track of 400 meters to the lap. The radii of the inner and outer competition lanes are 26 and 30 meters respectively. The width of each competition lane is 4 meters with an inside training lane of 4 meters.

When not hosting speed skating competitions, The Oval is open to public skating and family day events.

== Track records ==
Men
Event	Time	Name	Nation	Date	Ref
500 meters	34.52	Dai Dai Ntab	Netherlands	December 3, 2016	
2 x 500 meters	70.000	Joji Kato	Japan	February 2, 2011	
1,000 meters	1:08.66	Shani Davis	United States	November 30, 2013	
1,500 meters	1:45.06	Denis Yuskov	Russia	November 29, 2013	
3,000 meters	3:39.36	Wouter olde Heuvel	Netherlands	November 26, 2011	
5,000 meters	6:13.83	Sven Kramer	Netherlands	November 26, 2011	
10,000 meters	12:50.40	Jorrit Bergsma	Netherlands	December 2, 2012	
Women
Event	Time	Name	Nation	Date	Ref
500 meters	37.27	Lee Sang-hwa	South Korea	November 29, 2013	
2 x 500 meters	76.090	Yu Jing	China	February 2, 2011	
1,000 meters	1:14.10	Brittany Bowe	United States	February 28, 2015	
1,500 meters	1:56.10	Christine Nesbitt	Canada	November 26, 2011	
3,000 meters	4:02.90	Martina Sáblíková	Czech Republic	December 2, 2016	
5,000 meters	6:59.88	Martina Sáblíková	Czech Republic	November 29, 2013	

== See also ==
- List of indoor arenas in Kazakhstan
- List of indoor speed skating rinks
