= 2023–24 ISU Speed Skating World Cup – World Cup 4 =

Ice skating competition in Tomaszów Mazowiecki, Poland

2023–24 ISU Speed Skating World Cup 4
- Venue: Ice Arena; Tomaszów Mazowiecki; Poland
- Dates: 8 — 10 December 2023

The fourth competition weekend of the 2023–24 ISU Speed Skating World Cup is being held at the Ice Arena in Tomaszów Mazowiecki, Poland, from Friday, 8 December, until Sunday, 10 December 2023.

== Medal summary ==
=== Men's events ===
Event	Gold	Time	Silver	Time	Bronze	Time	Report
500 m (1)	Gao Tingyu; China	34.70	Laurent Dubreuil; Canada	34.77	Wataru Morishige; Japan	34.82	
500 m (2)	Laurent Dubreuil; Canada	34.73	Gao Tingyu; China	34.79	Damian Żurek; Poland	34.87	
1000 m	Jordan Stolz; United States	1:08.64	Ryota Kojima; Japan	1:09.73	Hein Otterspeer; Netherlands	1:09.80	
1500 m	Peder Kongshaug; Norway	1:46.41	Jordan Stolz; United States	1:46.48	Ning Zhongyan; China	1:46.99	
5000 m	Patrick Roest; Netherlands	6:18.01	Hallgeir Engebråten; Norway	6:23.84	Davide Ghiotto; Italy	6:24.66	
Mass start^{A}	Andrea Giovannini; Italy	60	Chung Jae-won; South Korea	40	Bart Hoolwerf; Netherlands	20	
Team pursuit	United States; Casey Dawson; Emery Lehman; Ethan Cepuran	3:44.85	Italy; Andrea Giovannini; Davide Ghiotto; Michele Malfatti	3:45.39	Norway; Sander Eitrem; Peder Kongshaug; Sverre Lunde Pedersen	3:46.50	

^{A} In mass start, race points are accumulated during the race based on results of the intermediate sprints and the final sprint. The skater with most race points is the winner.

=== Women's events ===
Event	Gold	Time	Silver	Time	Bronze	Time	Report
500 m (1)	Kim Min-sun; South Korea	37.82	Femke Kok; Netherlands	37.95	Andżelika Wójcik; Poland	38.16	
500 m (2)	Erin Jackson; United States	37.80	Kim Min-sun; South Korea	37.96	Femke Kok; Netherlands	38.13	
1000 m	Miho Takagi; Japan	1:15.28	Brittany Bowe; United States	1:16.20	Kimi Goetz; United States	1:16.25	
1500 m	Miho Takagi; Japan	1:56.63	Marijke Groenewoud; Netherlands	1:57.70	Joy Beune; Netherlands	1:58.21	
3000 m	Ragne Wiklund; Norway	4:06.69	Marijke Groenewoud; Netherlands	4:07.03	Irene Schouten; Netherlands	4:07.74	
Mass start^{A}	Irene Schouten; Netherlands	60	Ivanie Blondin; Canada	40	Mia Kilburg-Manganello; United States	20	
Team pursuit	Japan; Momoka Horikawa; Miho Takagi; Ayano Sato	3:00.35	Canada; Valérie Maltais; Béatrice Lamarche; Ivanie Blondin	3:03.24	Poland; Natalia Jabrzyk; Karolina Bosiek; Magdalena Czyszczoń	3:05.88	

^{A} In mass start, race points are accumulated during the race based on results of the intermediate sprints and the final sprint. The skater with most race points is the winner.

== Results ==
=== Men's events ===
==== 1st 500 m ====
The race started on 9 December 2023 at 14:42.

Rank	Pair	Lane	Name	Country	Time	Diff
1st place, gold medalist(s)	2	i	Gao Tingyu	China	34.70	
2nd place, silver medalist(s)	9	i	Laurent Dubreuil	Canada	34.77	+0.07
3rd place, bronze medalist(s)	10	o	Wataru Morishige	Japan	34.82	+0.12
4	2	o	Jordan Stolz	United States	34.82	+0.12
5	8	i	Tatsuya Shinhama	Japan	34.86	+0.16
6	8	o	Kim Jun-ho	South Korea	34.98	+0.28
7	7	o	Damian Żurek	Poland	34.99	+0.29
8	10	i	Yuma Murakami	Japan	35.02	+0.32
9	5	i	Marek Kania	Poland	35.03	+0.33
10	4	o	Håvard Holmefjord Lorentzen	Norway	35.21	+0.51
11	1	o	Jenning de Boo	Netherlands	35.24	+0.54
12	3	i	Takuya Morimoto	Japan	35.24	+0.54
13	5	o	Bjørn Magnussen	Norway	35.31	+0.61
14	6	o	Nil Llop	Spain	35.38	+0.68
15	1	i	Li Tianlong	China	35.42	+0.72
16	7	i	Janno Botman	Netherlands	35.43	+0.73
17	9	o	Yudai Yamamoto	Japan	35.45	+0.75
18	3	o	Piotr Michalski	Poland	35.47	+0.77
19	4	i	Hein Otterspeer	Netherlands	35.48	+0.78
20	6	i	David Bosa	Italy	35.69	+0.99

==== 2nd 500 m ====
The race started on 10 December 2023 at 15:20.

Rank	Pair	Lane	Name	Country	Time	Diff
1st place, gold medalist(s)	8	i	Laurent Dubreuil	Canada	34.73	
2nd place, silver medalist(s)	7	i	Gao Tingyu	China	34.79	+0.06
3rd place, bronze medalist(s)	7	o	Damian Żurek	Poland	34.87	+0.14
4	8	o	Yuma Murakami	Japan	34.89	+0.16
5	10	i	Tatsuya Shinhama	Japan	34.94	+0.21
6	3	o	Jordan Stolz	United States	34.95	+0.22
7	9	o	Wataru Morishige	Japan	34.97	+0.24
8	4	o	Håvard Holmefjord Lorentzen	Norway	35.12	+0.39
9	5	i	Nil Llop	Spain	35.21	+0.48
10	1	o	Cho Sang-hyeok	South Korea	35.23	+0.50
11	6	i	Janno Botman	Netherlands	35.23	+0.50
12	9	i	Kim Jun-ho	South Korea	35.28	+0.55
13	6	o	Marek Kania	Poland	35.31	+0.58
14	1	i	Sebastian Diniz	Netherlands	35.35	+0.62
15	4	i	Bjørn Magnussen	Norway	35.37	+0.64
16	3	i	Takuya Morimoto	Japan	35.43	+0.70
17	5	o	David Bosa	Italy	35.44	+0.71
18	10	o	Yudai Yamamoto	Japan	35.75	+1.02
19	2	o	Du Haonan	China	35.83	+1.10
	2	i	Hein Otterspeer	Netherlands	Disqualified	

==== 1000 m ====
The race started on 8 December 2023 at 19:00.

Rank	Pair	Lane	Name	Country	Time	Diff
1st place, gold medalist(s)	3	i	Jordan Stolz	United States	1:08.64	
2nd place, silver medalist(s)	2	o	Ryota Kojima	Japan	1:09.73	+1.09
3rd place, bronze medalist(s)	1	o	Hein Otterspeer	Netherlands	1:09.80	+1.16
4	8	i	Ning Zhongyan	China	1:09.90	+1.26
5	1	i	Hendrik Dombek	Germany	1:09.92	+1.28
6	7	o	Damian Żurek	Poland	1:09.94	+1.30
7	5	i	Moritz Klein	Germany	1:09.96	+1.32
8	5	o	Marten Liiv	Estonia	1:09.97	+1.33
9	3	o	Cooper McLeod	United States	1:10.09	+1.45
10	6	o	Tim Prins	Netherlands	1:10.10	+1.46
11	8	o	Tatsuya Shinhama	Japan	1:10.12	+1.48
12	9	o	Håvard Holmefjord Lorentzen	Norway	1:10.13	+1.49
13	10	i	Taiyo Nonomura	Japan	1:10.19	+1.55
14	9	i	Kazuya Yamada	Japan	1:10.24	+1.60
15	10	o	Masaya Yamada	Japan	1:10.30	+1.66
16	6	i	David Bosa	Italy	1:10.35	+1.71
17	4	o	Vincent De Haître	Canada	1:10.44	+1.80
18	2	i	Zach Stoppelmoor	United States	1:10.54	+1.90
19	4	i	Connor Howe	Canada	1:10.62	+1.98
	7	i	Jenning de Boo	Netherlands	Disqualified	

==== 1500 m ====
The race started on 9 December 2023 at 15:21.

Rank	Pair	Lane	Name	Country	Time	Diff
1st place, gold medalist(s)	7	o	Peder Kongshaug	Norway	1:46.41	
2nd place, silver medalist(s)	10	i	Jordan Stolz	United States	1:46.48	+0.07
3rd place, bronze medalist(s)	8	o	Ning Zhongyan	China	1:46.99	+0.58
4	9	i	Patrick Roest	Netherlands	1:47.07	+0.66
5	6	i	Wesly Dijs	Netherlands	1:47.19	+0.78
6	4	i	Bart Swings	Belgium	1:47.19	+0.78
7	6	o	Hendrik Dombek	Germany	1:47.29	+0.88
8	7	i	Hallgeir Engebråten	Norway	1:47.47	+1.06
9	3	i	Connor Howe	Canada	1:47.64	+1.23
10	4	o	Riku Tsuchiya	Japan	1:47.67	+1.26
11	8	i	Sander Eitrem	Norway	1:47.95	+1.54
12	2	o	Emery Lehman	United States	1:48.32	+1.91
13	9	o	Kazuya Yamada	Japan	1:48.47	+2.06
14	2	i	Alessio Trentini	Italy	1:48.72	+2.31
15	1	i	Chung Jae-won	South Korea	1:49.42	+3.01
16	1	o	Kristian Gamme Ulekleiv	Norway	1:49.47	+3.06
17	5	i	Taiyo Nonomura	Japan	1:50.02	+3.61
18	10	o	Masaya Yamada	Japan	1:50.22	+3.81
19	3	o	Antoine Gélinas-Beaulieu	Canada	1:50.24	+3.83
	5	o	Allan Dahl Johansson	Norway	Disqualified	

==== 5000 m ====
The race started on 10 December 2023 at 15:59.

Rank	Pair	Lane	Name	Country	Time	Diff
1st place, gold medalist(s)	7	o	Patrick Roest	Netherlands	6:18.01	
2nd place, silver medalist(s)	6	o	Hallgeir Engebråten	Norway	6:23.84	+5.83
3rd place, bronze medalist(s)	7	i	Davide Ghiotto	Italy	6:24.66	+6.65
4	8	o	Ted-Jan Bloemen	Canada	6:26.25	+8.24
5	8	i	Sverre Lunde Pedersen	Norway	6:27.20	+9.19
6	5	i	Bart Swings	Belgium	6:27.75	+9.74
7	6	i	Michele Malfatti	Italy	6:27.76	+9.75
8	5	o	Wu Yu	China	6:27.77	+9.76
9	2	o	Marwin Talsma	Netherlands	6:28.75	+10.74
10	4	o	Seitaro Ichinohe	Japan	6:28.81	+10.80
11	3	i	Sigurd Henriksen	Norway	6:29.08	+11.07
12	1	o	Ryosuke Tsuchiya	Japan	6:31.71	+13.70
13	3	o	Kristian Gamme Ulekleiv	Norway	6:31.97	+13.96
14	2	i	Riku Tsuchiya	Japan	6:32.26	+14.25
15	1	i	Graeme Fish	Canada	6:36.25	+18.24
16	4	i	Casey Dawson	United States	6:41.29	+23.28

==== Mass start ====
The race started on 8 December 2023 at 20:47.

Rank	Name	Country	Points	Time
1st place, gold medalist(s)	Andrea Giovannini	Italy	60	7:32.24
2nd place, silver medalist(s)	Chung Jae-won	South Korea	40	7:32.35
3rd place, bronze medalist(s)	Bart Hoolwerf	Netherlands	20	7:32.43
4	Bart Swings	Belgium	10	7:32.46
5	Livio Wenger	Switzerland	6	7:32.77
6	Kota Kikuchi	Japan	3	7:32.85
7	Antoine Gélinas-Beaulieu	Canada	3	7:38.24
8	Marcel Bosker	Netherlands	3	7:52.80
9	Allan Dahl Johansson	Norway	3	8:04.25
10	Kristian Gamme Ulekleiv	Norway	2	7:39.28
11	Mathieu Belloir	France	2	7:47.29
12	Conor McDermott-Mostowy	United States	2	7:54.68
13	Ethan Cepuran	United States	1	7:40.93
14	Peter Michael	New Zealand	1	7:44.61
15	Indra Medard	Belgium	1	8:05.94
16	Daniele Di Stefano	Italy		7:34.32
17	Gabriel Odor	Austria		7:35.05
18	Timothy Loubineaud	France		7:35.31
19	Lee Seung-hoon	South Korea		7:37.89
20	Felix Rhijnen	Germany		7:38.44
21	Felix Maly	Germany		7:38.58

==== Team pursuit ====
The race started on 9 December 2023 at 17:18.

Rank	Pair	Lane	Country	Time	Diff
1st place, gold medalist(s)	3	s	United States; Casey Dawson; Emery Lehman; Ethan Cepuran	3:44.85	
2nd place, silver medalist(s)	2	c	Italy; Andrea Giovannini; Davide Ghiotto; Michele Malfatti	3:45.39	+0.54
3rd place, bronze medalist(s)	2	s	Norway; Peder Kongshaug; Hallgeir Engebråten; Sverre Lunde Pedersen	3:46.50	+1.65
4	1	c	Netherlands; Marcel Bosker; Bart Hoolwerf; Gert Wierda	3:49.34	+4.49
5	3	c	China; Wang Shuaihan; Wu Yu; Sun Chuanyi	3:49.60	+4.75
6	1	s	Japan; Seitaro Ichinohe; Riku Tsuchiya; Kotaro Kasahara	3:49.75	+4.90

=== Women's events ===
==== 1st 500 m ====
The race started on 8 December 2023 at 18:30.

Rank	Pair	Lane	Name	Country	Time	Diff
1st place, gold medalist(s)	10	o	Kim Min-sun	South Korea	37.82	
2nd place, silver medalist(s)	8	o	Femke Kok	Netherlands	37.95	+0.13
3rd place, bronze medalist(s)	4	i	Andżelika Wójcik	Poland	38.16	+0.34
4	10	i	Erin Jackson	United States	38.17	+0.35
5	8	i	Kimi Goetz	United States	38.45	+0.63
6	5	o	Dione Voskamp	Netherlands	38.47	+0.65
7	9	o	Marrit Fledderus	Netherlands	38.52	+0.70
8	1	o	Michelle de Jong	Netherlands	38.52	+0.70
9	6	o	Vanessa Herzog	Austria	38.53	+0.71
10	5	i	Naomi Verkerk	Netherlands	38.55	+0.73
11	7	i	Kurumi Inagawa	Japan	38.60	+0.78
12	9	i	Tian Ruining	China	38.68	+0.86
13	4	o	Carolina Hiller	Canada	38.70	+0.88
14	7	o	Yukino Yoshida	Japan	38.73	+0.91
15	3	i	Sarah Warren	United States	38.90	+1.08
16	6	i	Rio Yamada	Japan	39.03	+1.21
17	1	i	Nadezhda Morozova	Kazakhstan	39.14	+1.32
18	2	o	Martine Ripsrud	Norway	39.18	+1.36
19	3	o	Martyna Baran	Poland	39.24	+1.42
20	2	i	Julie Nistad Samsonsen	Norway	39.82	+2.00

==== 2nd 500 m ====
The race started on 9 December 2023 at 16:02.

Rank	Pair	Lane	Name	Country	Time	Diff
1st place, gold medalist(s)	8	i	Erin Jackson	United States	37.80	
2nd place, silver medalist(s)	10	o	Kim Min-sun	South Korea	37.96	+0.16
3rd place, bronze medalist(s)	8	o	Femke Kok	Netherlands	38.13	+0.33
4	9	i	Marrit Fledderus	Netherlands	38.28	+0.48
5	10	i	Kimi Goetz	United States	38.32	+0.52
6	6	i	Vanessa Herzog	Austria	38.41	+0.61
7	6	o	Andżelika Wójcik	Poland	38.47	+0.67
8	5	o	Dione Voskamp	Netherlands	38.51	+0.71
9	5	i	Naomi Verkerk	Netherlands	38.54	+0.74
10	4	o	Sarah Warren	United States	38.57	+0.77
11	3	i	Lee Na-hyun	South Korea	38.60	+0.80
12	9	o	Kurumi Inagawa	Japan	38.62	+0.82
13	1	o	Serena Pergher	Italy	38.74	+0.94
14	7	o	Rio Yamada	Japan	38.76	+0.96
15	7	i	Yukino Yoshida	Japan	38.76	+0.96
16	3	o	Karolina Bosiek	Poland	38.80	+1.00
17	4	i	Carolina Hiller	Canada	38.89	+1.09
18	2	i	Kako Yamane	Japan	38.99	+1.19
19	1	i	Chong Pei	China	38.99	+1.19
20	2	o	Martyna Baran	Poland	39.10	+1.30

==== 1000 m ====
The race started on 10 December 2023 at 14:45.

Rank	Pair	Lane	Name	Country	Time	Diff
1st place, gold medalist(s)	8	o	Miho Takagi	Japan	1:15.28	
2nd place, silver medalist(s)	8	i	Brittany Bowe	United States	1:16.20	+0.92
3rd place, bronze medalist(s)	9	o	Kimi Goetz	United States	1:16.25	+0.97
4	4	i	Femke Kok	Netherlands	1:16.51	+1.23
5	9	i	Han Mei	China	1:16.78	+1.50
6	10	i	Ivanie Blondin	Canada	1:16.92	+1.64
7	5	i	Ellia Smeding	United Kingdom	1:17.51	+2.23
8	6	o	Kim Min-sun	South Korea	1:17.60	+2.32
8	10	o	Nadezhda Morozova	Kazakhstan	1:17.60	+2.32
10	7	i	Karolina Bosiek	Poland	1:17.62	+2.34
11	3	o	Erin Jackson	United States	1:17.65	+2.37
12	7	o	Ayano Sato	Japan	1:18.07	+2.79
13	5	o	Yekaterina Aydova	Kazakhstan	1:18.28	+3.00
14	2	o	Helga Drost	Netherlands	1:18.53	+3.25
15	1	o	Mia Kilburg-Manganello	United States	1:18.57	+3.29
16	1	i	Vanessa Herzog	Austria	1:18.76	+3.48
17	3	i	Lee Na-hyun	South Korea	1:18.83	+3.55
18	2	i	Maddison Pearman	Canada	1:18.92	+3.64
19	4	o	Alina Dauranova	Kazakhstan	1:19.55	+4.27
20	6	i	Rio Yamada	Japan	1:35.89	+20.61

==== 1500 m ====
The race started on 9 December 2023 at 14:00.

Rank	Pair	Lane	Name	Country	Time	Diff
1st place, gold medalist(s)	10	i	Miho Takagi	Japan	1:56.63	
2nd place, silver medalist(s)	6	o	Marijke Groenewoud	Netherlands	1:57.70	+1.07
3rd place, bronze medalist(s)	5	i	Joy Beune	Netherlands	1:58.21	+1.58
4	9	i	Han Mei	China	1:58.76	+2.13
5	8	i	Brittany Bowe	United States	1:58.82	+2.19
6	9	o	Ragne Wiklund	Norway	1:58.83	+2.20
7	10	o	Ivanie Blondin	Canada	1:59.42	+2.79
8	7	i	Ayano Sato	Japan	1:59.61	+2.98
9	8	o	Kimi Goetz	United States	1:59.87	+3.24
10	6	i	Nadezhda Morozova	Kazakhstan	2:00.24	+3.61
11	1	i	Elisa Dul	Netherlands	2:00.41	+3.78
12	1	o	Francesca Lollobrigida	Italy	2:00.51	+3.88
13	5	o	Mia Kilburg-Manganello	United States	2:00.73	+4.10
14	2	i	Sumire Kikuchi	Japan	2:00.83	+4.20
15	3	i	Yuna Onodera	Japan	2:01.81	+5.18
16	3	o	Yang Binyu	China	2:02.19	+5.56
17	2	o	Isabelle van Elst	Belgium	2:02.23	+5.60
18	7	o	Valérie Maltais	Canada	2:02.60	+5.97
19	4	o	Kaitlyn McGregor	Switzerland	2:02.78	+6.15
20	4	i	Esther Kiel	Netherlands	2:03.76	+7.13

==== 3000 m ====
The race started on 8 December 2023 at 19:43.

Rank	Pair	Lane	Name	Country	Time	Diff
1st place, gold medalist(s)	6	i	Ragne Wiklund	Norway	4:06.69	
2nd place, silver medalist(s)	3	i	Marijke Groenewoud	Netherlands	4:07.03	+0.34
3rd place, bronze medalist(s)	2	o	Irene Schouten	Netherlands	4:07.74	+1.05
4	3	o	Joy Beune	Netherlands	4:10.09	+3.40
5	1	i	Elisa Dul	Netherlands	4:10.09	+3.40
6	7	i	Martina Sábliková	Czech Republic	4:10.40	+3.71
7	1	o	Francesca Lollobrigida	Italy	4:11.64	+4.95
8	7	o	Valérie Maltais	Canada	4:12.33	+5.64
9	8	o	Han Mei	China	4:12.77	+6.08
10	5	i	Momoka Horikawa	Japan	4:13.75	+7.06
11	6	o	Ivanie Blondin	Canada	4:14.61	+7.92
12	4	i	Yang Binyu	China	4:16.10	+9.41
13	8	i	Sanne In 't Hof	Netherlands	4:16.88	+10.19
14	4	o	Yuna Onodera	Japan	4:17.83	+11.14
15	5	o	Magdalena Czyszczoń	Poland	4:22.70	+16.01
16	2	i	Laura Hall	Canada	4:25.75	+19.06

==== Mass start ====
The race started on 10 December 2023 at 17:21.

Rank	Name	Country	Points	Time
1st place, gold medalist(s)	Irene Schouten	Netherlands	60	8:42.90
2nd place, silver medalist(s)	Ivanie Blondin	Canada	40	8:42.94
3rd place, bronze medalist(s)	Mia Kilburg-Manganello	United States	20	8:42.95
4	Marijke Groenewoud	Netherlands	10	8:43.12
5	Francesca Lollobrigida	Italy	9	8:43.12
6	Valérie Maltais	Canada	4	8:43.26
7	Laura Lorenzato	Italy	4	8:52.12
8	Michelle Uhrig	Germany	4	8:53.29
9	Ramona Härdi	Switzerland	3	8:52.26
10	Zuzana Kuršová	Czech Republic	2	8:52.48
11	Magdalena Czyszczoń	Poland	1	8:48.75
12	Momoka Horikawa	Japan		8:44.32
13	Sumire Kikuchi	Japan		8:44.33
14	Kaitlyn McGregor	Switzerland		8:44.64
15	Sandrine Tas	Belgium		8:44.90
16	Park Ji-woo	South Korea		8:45.11
17	Giorgia Birkeland	United States		8:45.33
18	Josephine Heimerl	Germany		8:48.72
19	Olga Piotrowska	Poland		9:14.96
20	Jin Wenjing	China		9:21.64

==== Team pursuit ====
The race started on 9 December 2023 at 16:41.

Rank	Pair	Lane	Country	Time	Diff
1st place, gold medalist(s)	3	c	Japan; Momoka Horikawa; Miho Takagi; Ayano Sato	3:00.35	
2nd place, silver medalist(s)	4	c	Canada; Valérie Maltais; Béatrice Lamarche; Ivanie Blondin	3:03.24	+2.89
3rd place, bronze medalist(s)	3	s	Poland; Natalia Jabrzyk; Karolina Bosiek; Magdalena Czyszczoń	3:05.88	+5.53
4	2	s	China; Han Mei; Jin Wenjing; Yang Binyu	3:07.68	+7.33
5	2	c	Switzerland; Jasmin Güntert; Kaitlyn McGregor; Ramona Härdi	3:08.90	+8.55
6	1	c	Germany; Lea Sophie Scholz; Josephine Schlörb; Josie Hofmann	3:09.27	+8.92
7	1	s	United States; Mia Kilburg-Manganello; Giorgia Birkeland; Greta Myers	3:09.69	+9.34
	4	s	Netherlands; Joy Beune; Irene Schouten; Marijke Groenewoud	Disqualified	
