= 2017 World Allround Speed Skating Championships – Men =

Men at the 2017 World Allround Speed Skating Championships
- Venue: Vikingskipet
- Location: Hamar, Norway
- Dates: 4–5 March
- Competitors: 24 from 11 nations
- Winning time: 148.425

Medalists
gold medal	Sven Kramer	Netherlands
silver medal	Patrick Roest	Netherlands
bronze medal	Jan Blokhuijsen	Netherlands

The Men competition at the 2017 World Championships was held on 4 and 5 March 2017.

== Results ==
=== 500 m ===
The race was started on 4 March 2017 at 13:42.

Rank	Pair	Lane	Name	Country	Time	Diff
1	11	i	Shota Nakamura	Japan	36.00	
2	9	o	Konrad Niedźwiedzki	Poland	36.22	+0.22
3	12	o	Sindre Henriksen	Norway	36.23	+0.23
4	10	i	Patrick Roest	Netherlands	36.27	+0.27
5	8	o	Denis Yuskov	Russia	36.30	+0.30
6	11	o	Jan Blokhuijsen	Netherlands	36.34	+0.34
7	7	i	Jan Szymański	Poland	36.37	+0.37
8	6	o	Sven Kramer	Netherlands	36.41	+0.41
9	7	o	Sergey Trofimov	Russia	36.52	+0.52
10	12	i	Simen Spieler Nilsen	Norway	36.54	+0.54
10	5	i	Sverre Lunde Pedersen	Norway	36.54	+0.54
12	6	i	Haralds Silovs	Latvia	36.57	+0.57
13	9	i	Benjamin Donnelly	Canada	36.75	+0.75
14	10	o	Shane Williamson	Japan	36.79	+0.79
15	5	o	Andrea Giovannini	Italy	36.80	+0.80
16	8	i	Bart Swings	Belgium	36.87	+0.87
17	2	o	Adrian Wielgat	Poland	37.40	+1.40
18	1	i	Nicola Tumolero	Italy	37.43	+1.43
19	3	o	Ryosuke Tsuchiya	Japan	37.60	+1.60
20	2	i	Patrick Beckert	Germany	37.74	+1.74
21	4	i	Felix Maly	Germany	37.91	+1.91
22	3	i	Danila Semerikov	Russia	38.15	+2.15
23	4	o	Michele Malfatti	Italy	38.64	+2.64
24	1	o	Sebastian Druszkiewicz	Czech Republic	38.81	+2.81

=== 5000 m ===
The race was started on 4 March 2017 at 15:55.

Rank	Pair	Lane	Name	Country	Time	Diff
1	11	o	Sven Kramer	Netherlands	6:12.33	
2	9	o	Patrick Roest	Netherlands	6:15.10	+2.77
3	9	i	Jan Blokhuijsen	Netherlands	6:15.99	+3.66
4	10	i	Patrick Beckert	Germany	6:19.88	+7.55
5	10	o	Andrea Giovannini	Italy	6:21.60	+9.27
6	12	i	Bart Swings	Belgium	6:22.44	+10.11
7	12	o	Sverre Lunde Pedersen	Norway	6:23.61	+11.28
8	7	o	Nicola Tumolero	Italy	6:24.87	+12.54
9	8	o	Ryosuke Tsuchiya	Japan	6:25.24	+12.91
10	8	i	Shane Williamson	Japan	6:28.98	+16.65
11	5	o	Sindre Henriksen	Norway	6:29.27	+16.94
12	2	o	Haralds Silovs	Latvia	6:30.93	+18.60
13	4	o	Denis Yuskov	Russia	6:31.71	+19.38
14	7	i	Benjamin Donnelly	Canada	6:31.83	+19.50
15	3	o	Shota Nakamura	Japan	6:32.34	+20.01
16	5	i	Jan Szymański	Poland	6:32.81	+20.48
17	1	o	Sebastian Druszkiewicz	Czech Republic	6:34.04	+21.71
18	6	i	Danila Semerikov	Russia	6:34.31	+21.98
19	3	i	Konrad Niedźwiedzki	Poland	6:34.35	+22.02
20	6	o	Simen Spieler Nilsen	Norway	6:34.71	+22.38
21	2	i	Sergey Trofimov	Russia	6:35.04	+22.71
22	11	i	Michele Malfatti	Italy	6:36.29	+23.96
23	4	i	Adrian Wielgat	Poland	6:42.80	+30.47
24	1	i	Felix Maly	Germany	6:46.08	+33.75

=== 1500 m ===
The race was started on 5 March 2017 at 14:28.

Rank	Pair	Lane	Name	Country	Time	Diff
1	8	i	Denis Yuskov	Russia	1:44.41	
2	12	i	Sven Kramer	Netherlands	1:45.78	+1.37
3	12	o	Patrick Roest	Netherlands	1:45.88	+1.47
4	11	o	Sverre Lunde Pedersen	Norway	1:46.23	+1.82
5	7	o	Haralds Silovs	Latvia	1:46.30	+1.89
6	10	o	Bart Swings	Belgium	1:46.34	+1.93
7	9	o	Shota Nakamura	Japan	1:46.41	+2.00
8	4	o	Sergey Trofimov	Russia	1:46.57	+2.16
9	9	i	Sindre Henriksen	Norway	1:46.85	+2.44
10	8	o	Jan Szymański	Poland	1:47.12	+2.71
11	7	i	Konrad Niedźwiedzki	Poland	1:47.60	+3.19
12	5	i	Nicola Tumolero	Italy	1:47.71	+3.30
13	6	i	Shane Williamson	Japan	1:47.83	+3.42
14	6	o	Patrick Beckert	Germany	1:47.88	+3.47
15	11	i	Jan Blokhuijsen	Netherlands	1:48.27	+3.86
16	10	i	Andrea Giovannini	Italy	1:48.48	+4.07
17	5	o	Benjamin Donnelly	Canada	1:48.52	+4.11
18	3	i	Ryosuke Tsuchiya	Japan	1:48.97	+4.56
19	2	i	Adrian Wielgat	Poland	1:50.01	+5.60
20	4	i	Simen Spieler Nilsen	Norway	1:50.05	+5.64
21	1	o	Felix Maly	Germany	1:51.06	+6.65
22	3	o	Danila Semerikov	Russia	1:51.10	+6.69
23	1	i	Michele Malfatti	Italy	1:51.38	+6.97
24	2	o	Sebastian Druszkiewicz	Czech Republic	1:52.04	+7.63

=== 10,000 m ===
The race was started on 5 March 2017 at 16:22.

Rank	Pair	Lane	Name	Country	Time	Diff
1	4	i	Sven Kramer	Netherlands	13:10.45	
2	3	i	Jan Blokhuijsen	Netherlands	13:13.39	+2.94
3	2	i	Bart Swings	Belgium	13:20.61	+10.16
4	1	i	Patrick Beckert	Germany	13:20.84	+10.39
5	4	o	Patrick Roest	Netherlands	13:21.11	+10.66
6	3	o	Sverre Lunde Pedersen	Norway	13:24.57	+14.12
7	1	o	Andrea Giovannini	Italy	13:26.17	+15.72
8	2	o	Shota Nakamura	Japan	13:57.88	+47.43

=== Overall standings ===
After all events.

Rank	Name	Country	Points	Diff
1st place, gold medalist(s)	Sven Kramer	Netherlands	148.425	
2nd place, silver medalist(s)	Patrick Roest	Netherlands	149.128	+0.71
3rd place, bronze medalist(s)	Jan Blokhuijsen	Netherlands	149.698	+1.28
4	Sverre Lunde Pedersen	Norway	150.539	+2.12
5	Bart Swings	Belgium	150.590	+2.17
6	Andrea Giovannini	Italy	151.428	+3.01
7	Patrick Beckert	Germany	151.730	+3.31
8	Shota Nakamura	Japan	152.598	+4.18
9	Denis Yuskov	Russia	110.286	
10	Sindre Henriksen	Norway	110.773	
11	Haralds Silovs	Latvia	111.096	
12	Jan Szymański	Poland	111.357	
13	Konrad Niedźwiedzki	Poland	111.521	
14	Sergey Trofimov	Russia	111.547	
15	Shane Williamson	Japan	111.631	
16	Nicola Tumolero	Italy	111.820	
17	Benjamin Donnelly	Canada	112.094	
18	Ryosuke Tsuchiya	Japan	112.447	
19	Simen Spieler Nilsen	Norway	112.694	
20	Adrian Wielgat	Poland	114.350	
21	Danila Semerikov	Russia	114.614	
22	Michele Malfatti	Italy	115.395	
23	Felix Maly	Germany	115.538	
24	Sebastian Druszkiewicz	Czech Republic	115.560	
