= 2019 World Single Distances Speed Skating Championships – Men's 5000 metres =

Men's 5000 metres at the 2019 World Single Distances Speed Skating Championships
- Venue: Max Aicher Arena
- Location: Inzell, Germany
- Dates: 7 February
- Competitors: 20 from 10 nations
- Winning time: 6:07.16

Medalists
gold medal	Sverre Lunde Pedersen	Norway
silver medal	Patrick Roest	Netherlands
bronze medal	Sven Kramer	Netherlands

The Men's 5000 metres competition at the 2019 World Single Distances Speed Skating Championships was held on 7 February 2019.

== Results ==
The race was started at 17:54.

Rank	Pair	Lane	Name	Country	Time	Diff
1st place, gold medalist(s)	9	i	Sverre Lunde Pedersen	Norway	6:07.16	
2nd place, silver medalist(s)	10	i	Patrick Roest	Netherlands	6:11.70	+4.54
3rd place, bronze medalist(s)	7	o	Sven Kramer	Netherlands	6:12.53	+5.37
4	8	i	Aleksandr Rumyantsev	Russia	6:13.75	+6.59
5	2	i	Ted-Jan Bloemen	Canada	6:13.79	+6.63
6	10	o	Patrick Beckert	Germany	6:15.76	+8.60
7	6	i	Sergey Trofimov	Russia	6:16.10	+8.94
8	9	o	Danila Semerikov	Russia	6:16.59	+9.43
9	5	o	Jordan Belchos	Canada	6:18.06	+10.90
10	2	o	Peter Michael	New Zealand	6:19.35	+12.19
11	7	i	Davide Ghiotto	Italy	6:19.47	+12.31
12	3	i	Jorrit Bergsma	Netherlands	6:20.29	+13.13
13	6	o	Andrea Giovannini	Italy	6:21.17	+14.01
14	1	i	Graeme Fish	Canada	6:23.37	+16.21
15	8	o	Bart Swings	Belgium	6:23.58	+16.42
16	5	i	Håvard Bøkko	Norway	6:23.80	+16.64
17	4	i	Michele Malfatti	Italy	6:25.02	+17.86
18	3	o	Vitaly Mikhailov	Belarus	6:26.50	+19.34
19	4	o	Ryosuke Tsuchiya	Japan	6:29.28	+22.12
20	1	o	Takahiro Ito	Japan	6:31.92	+24.76
