= 2020 European Speed Skating Championships – Men's 5000 metres =

Men's 5000 metres at the 2020 European Speed Skating Championships
- Venue: Thialf
- Location: Heerenveen, Netherlands
- Dates: 11 January
- Competitors: 16 from 8 nations
- Winning time: 6:08.92

Medalists
gold medal	Patrick Roest	Netherlands
silver medal	Sven Kramer	Netherlands
bronze medal	Denis Yuskov	Russia

The men's 5000 metres competition at the 2020 European Speed Skating Championships was held on 11 January 2020.

== Results ==
The race was started at 16:08.

Rank	Pair	Lane	Name	Country	Time	Diff
1st place, gold medalist(s)	6	o	Patrick Roest	Netherlands	6:08.92 TR	
2nd place, silver medalist(s)	2	o	Sven Kramer	Netherlands	6:10.76	+1.84
3rd place, bronze medalist(s)	8	o	Denis Yuskov	Russia	6:12.26	+3.34
4	8	i	Jorrit Bergsma	Netherlands	6:12.51	+3.59
5	6	i	Danila Semerikov	Russia	6:13.77	+4.85
6	4	i	Sverre Lunde Pedersen	Norway	6:14.58	+5.66
7	7	o	Aleksandr Rumyantsev	Russia	6:16.09	+7.17
8	5	i	Andrea Giovannini	Italy	6:16.88	+7.96
9	7	i	Davide Ghiotto	Italy	6:17.54	+8.62
10	5	o	Bart Swings	Belgium	6:22.32	+13.40
11	4	o	Timothy Loubineaud	France	6:24.62	+15.70
12	1	o	Hallgeir Engebråten	Norway	6:25.25	+16.33
13	3	o	Håvard Bøkko	Norway	6:26.44	+17.52
14	3	i	Michele Malfatti	Italy	6:26.62	+17.70
15	2	i	Felix Maly	Germany	6:27.97	+19.05
16	1	i	Szymon Pałka	Poland	6:30.10	+21.18
