= 2019 World Single Distances Speed Skating Championships – Men's 10,000 metres =

Men's 10,000 metres at the 2019 World Single Distances Speed Skating Championships
- Venue: Max Aicher Arena
- Location: Inzell, Germany
- Dates: 9 February
- Competitors: 12 from 8 nations
- Winning time: 12:52.92

Medalists
gold medal	Jorrit Bergsma	Netherlands
silver medal	Patrick Roest	Netherlands
bronze medal	Danila Semerikov	Russia

The Men's 10,000 metres competition at the 2019 World Single Distances Speed Skating Championships was held on 9 February 2019.

== Results ==
The race was started at 15:49.

Rank	Pair	Lane	Name	Country	Time	Diff
1st place, gold medalist(s)	4	i	Jorrit Bergsma	Netherlands	12:52.92	
2nd place, silver medalist(s)	6	o	Patrick Roest	Netherlands	12:53.34	+0.42
3rd place, bronze medalist(s)	6	i	Danila Semerikov	Russia	12:57.400	+4.48
4	5	i	Patrick Beckert	Germany	12:57.402	+4.48
5	4	o	Aleksandr Rumyantsev	Russia	12:57.92	+5.00
6	5	o	Davide Ghiotto	Italy	13:04.49	+11.57
7	2	o	Graeme Fish	Canada	13:05.69	+12.77
8	3	o	Peter Michael	New Zealand	13:13.72	+20.80
9	2	i	Michele Malfatti	Italy	13:18.37	+25.45
10	3	i	Ole Bjørnsmoen Næss	Norway	13:18.64	+25.72
11	1	o	Ryosuke Tsuchiya	Japan	13:22.97	+30.05
12	1	i	Takahiro Ito	Japan	13:32.31	+39.39
