= 2022 European Speed Skating Championships – Men's 5000 metres =

Men's 5000 metres at the 2022 European Speed Skating Championships
- Venue: Thialf
- Location: Heerenveen, Netherlands
- Dates: 8 January
- Competitors: 16 from 8 nations
- Winning time: 6:11.54

Medalists
gold medal	Patrick Roest	Netherlands
silver medal	Jorrit Bergsma	Netherlands
bronze medal	Hallgeir Engebråten	Norway

The men's 5000 metres competition at the 2022 European Speed Skating Championships was held on 8 January 2022.

== Results ==
The race was started at 15:28.

Rank	Pair	Lane	Name	Country	Time	Diff
1st place, gold medalist(s)	8	i	Patrick Roest	Netherlands	6:11.54	
2nd place, silver medalist(s)	7	o	Jorrit Bergsma	Netherlands	6:13.47	+1.93
3rd place, bronze medalist(s)	2	i	Hallgeir Engebråten	Norway	6:13.67	+2.13
4	7	i	Bart Swings	Belgium	6:15.06	+3.52
5	3	i	Sergey Trofimov	Russia	6:17.24	+5.70
6	1	o	Sven Kramer	Netherlands	6:18.11	+6.57
7	6	i	Davide Ghiotto	Italy	6:18.32	+6.78
8	8	o	Aleksandr Rumyantsev	Russia	6:18.50	+6.96
9	5	i	Sverre Lunde Pedersen	Norway	6:20.99	+9.45
10	6	o	Ruslan Zakharov	Russia	6:22.38	+10.84
11	3	o	Felix Rijhnen	Germany	6:23.30	+11.76
12	4	o	Michele Malfatti	Italy	6:24.17	+12.63
13	5	o	Andrea Giovannini	Italy	6:24.28	+12.74
14	4	i	Livio Wenger	Switzerland	6:33.26	+21.72
15	1	i	Fridtjof Petzold	Germany	6:37.29	+25.75
16	2	o	Wilhelm Ekensskär	Sweden	7:05.36	+53.82
