= 2019 World Allround Speed Skating Championships – Men =

Men at the World Allround Speed Skating Championships
- Venue: Olympic Oval
- Location: Calgary, Canada
- Dates: 2–3 March
- Competitors: 24 from 13 nations
- Winning points: 145.561

Medalists
gold medal	Patrick Roest	Netherlands
silver medal	Sverre Lunde Pedersen	Norway
bronze medal	Sven Kramer	Netherlands

The Men competition at the 2019 World Allround Speed Skating Championships was held on 2 and 3 March 2019.

== Results ==
=== 500 m ===
The race was started on 2 March at 12:29.

Rank	Pair	Lane	Name	Country	Time	Diff
1	2	O	Antoine Gélinas-Beaulieu	Canada	35.53	
2	12	I	Patrick Roest	Netherlands	35.74	+0.21
4	10	I	Sverre Lunde Pedersen	Norway	35.85	+0.32
3	11	I	Håvard Bøkko	Norway	35.88	+0.35
5	10	O	Haralds Silovs	Latvia	36.00	+0.47
6	7	O	Sindre Henriksen	Norway	36.12	+0.59
7	8	O	Francesco Betti	Italy	36.15	+0.62
8	9	I	Riku Tsuchiya	Japan	36.18	+0.65
9	12	O	Sven Kramer	Netherlands	36.41	+0.88
10	6	I	Douwe de Vries	Netherlands	36.46	+0.93
11	9	O	Livio Wenger	Switzerland	36.52	+0.99
12	3	O	Bart Swings	Belgium	36.71	+1.18
13	8	I	Lukas Mann	Germany	36.86	+1.33
14	11	O	Andrea Giovannini	Italy	36.89	+1.36
15	5	I	Ryosuke Tsuchiya	Japan	36.93	+1.40
16	7	I	Ethan Cepuran	United States	37.06	+1.53
17	6	O	Sergey Trofimov	Russia	37.10	+1.57
18	1	O	Vitaly Mikhailov	Belarus	37.24	+1.71
19	5	O	Ted-Jan Bloemen	Canada	37.31	+1.78
20	1	I	Danila Semerikov	Russia	37.48	+1.95
21	3	I	Jordan Belchos	Canada	37.51	+1.98
22	2	I	Patrick Beckert	Germany	37.59	+2.06
23	4	O	Michele Malfatti	Italy	38.37	+2.84
24	4	I	Viktor Hald Thorup	Denmark	38.45	+2.92

=== 5000 m ===
The race was started on 2 March at 14:23.

Rank	Pair	Lane	Name	Country	Time	Diff
1	11	I	Patrick Roest	Netherlands	6:08.27	
2	10	O	Sven Kramer	Netherlands	6:08.83	+0.56
3	9	I	Sverre Lunde Pedersen	Norway	6:10.10	+1.83
4	9	O	Douwe de Vries	Netherlands	6:12.72	+4.45
5	12	I	Ted-Jan Bloemen	Canada	6:13.20	+4.93
6	11	O	Danila Semerikov	Russia	6:13.75	+5.48
7	10	I	Patrick Beckert	Germany	6:15.99	+7.72
8	5	O	Jordan Belchos	Canada	6:17.90	9.63
9	4	O	Viktor Hald Thorup	Denmark	6:18.25	+9.98
10	8	I	Ryosuke Tsuchiya	Japan	6:19.76	+11.49
11	8	O	Livio Wenger	Switzerland	6:22.00	+13.73
12	6	I	Andrea Giovannini	Italy	6:22.31	+14.04
13	7	I	Bart Swings	Belgium	6:23.46	+15.19
14	6	O	Vitaly Mikhailov	Belarus	6:23.54	+15.27
15	3	O	Haralds Silovs	Latvia	6:24.80	+16.53
16	5	I	Michele Malfatti	Italy	6:25.71	+17.44
17	3	I	Riku Tsuchiya	Japan	6:26.12	+17.85
18	2	O	Sindre Henriksen	Norway	6:26.64	+18.37
19	12	O	Sergey Trofimov	Russia	6:26.92	+18.65
20	7	O	Håvard Bøkko	Norway	6:29.43	+21.16
21	4	I	Francesco Betti	Italy	6:34.97	+26.70
22	1	O	Lukas Mann	Germany	6:36.46	+28.19
23	1	I	Antoine Gélinas-Beaulieu	Canada	6:43.35	+35.08
24	2	I	Ethan Cepuran	United States	6:44.81	+36.54

=== 1500 m ===
The race was started on 3 March at 12:50.

Rank	Pair	Lane	Name	Country	Time	Diff
1	12	O	Sverre Lunde Pedersen	Norway	1:43.11	
2	12	I	Patrick Roest	Netherlands	1:43.31	+0.20
3	11	I	Sven Kramer	Netherlands	1:43.87	+0.76
4	9	O	Sindre Henriksen	Norway	1:44.18	+1.07
5	11	O	Douwe de Vries	Netherlands	1:44.24	+1.13
6	3	O	Antoine Gélinas-Beaulieu	Canada	1:44.93	+1.82
7	6	I	Bart Swings	Belgium	1:44.96	+1.85
8	9	I	Livio Wenger	Switzerland	1:45.04	+1.93
9	10	I	Haralds Silovs	Latvia	1:45.24	+2.13
10	7	O	Riku Tsuchiya	Japan	1:45.44	+2.33
11	8	O	Håvard Bøkko	Norway	1:45.65	+2.54
12	10	O	Ted-Jan Bloemen	Canada	1:46.03	+2.92
13	5	I	Patrick Beckert	Germany	1:46.24	+3.13
14	6	O	Andrea Giovannini	Italy	1:46.36	+3.25
15	8	I	Ryosuke Tsuchiya	Japan	1:46.68	+3.57
16	5	O	Jordan Belchos	Canada	1:46.69	+3.58
17	4	O	Francesco Betti	Italy	1:46.98	+3.87
18	2	O	Lukas Mann	Germany	1:47.07	+3.96
19	4	I	Vitaly Mikhailov	Belarus	1:47.38	+4.27
20	7	I	Danila Semerikov	Russia	1:47.96	+4.85
21	2	I	Viktor Hald Thorup	Denmark	1:48.29	+5.18
22	1	I	Michele Malfatti	Italy	1:48.72	+5.61
23	3	I	Sergey Trofimov	Russia	1:48.77	+5.66
24	1	O	Ethan Cepuran	United States	1:49.49	+6.38

=== 10000 m ===
The race was started on 3 March at 14:26.

Rank	Pair	Lane	Name	Country	Time	Diff
1	4	I	Patrick Roest	Netherlands	12:51.17	
2	1	I	Ted-Jan Bloemen	Canada	12:53.15	+1.98
3	3	I	Sverre Lunde Pedersen	Norway	12:56.91	+5.73
4	4	O	Sven Kramer	Netherlands	13:00.93	+9.75
5	3	O	Douwe de Vries	Netherlands	13:01.44	+10.27
6	1	O	Danila Semerikov	Russia	13:18.92	+27.75
7	2	O	Sindre Henriksen	Norway	13:30.71	+39.53
8	2	I	Haralds Silovs	Latvia	13:54.14	+1:02.97

=== Overall standings ===
After all events.

Rank	Name	Country	500m	5000m	1500m	10000m	Points	Diff
1st place, gold medalist(s)	Patrick Roest	Netherlands	35.74	6:08.27	1:43.31	12:51.17	145.561 WR	
2nd place, silver medalist(s)	Sverre Lunde Pedersen	Norway	35.85	6:10.10	1:43.11	12:56.91	146.075	+0.52
3rd place, bronze medalist(s)	Sven Kramer	Netherlands	36.41	6:08.83	1:43.87	13:00.93	146.962	+1.41
4	Douwe de Vries	Netherlands	36.46	6:12.72	1:44.24	13:01.44	147.550	+1.99
5	Ted-Jan Bloemen	Canada	37.31	6:13.20	1:46.03	12:53.15	148.630	+3.07
6	Sindre Henriksen	Norway	36.12	6:26.64	1:44.18	13:30.71	150.045	+4.49
7	Danila Semerikov	Russia	37.48	6:13.75	1:47.96	13:18.92	150.787	+5.23
8	Haralds Silovs	Latvia	36.00	6:24.80	1:45.24	13:54.14	151.267	+5.71
9	Livio Wenger	Switzerland	36.52	6:22.00	1:45.04	—	109.733	—
10	Riku Tsuchiya	Japan	36.18	6:26.12	1:45.44	—	109.938	—
11	Håvard Bøkko	Norway	35.88	6:29.43	1:45.65	—	110.039	—
12	Bart Swings	Belgium	36.71	6:23.46	1:44.96	—	110.042	—
13	Ryosuke Tsuchiya	Japan	36.93	6:19.76	1:46.68	—	110.466	—
14	Andrea Giovannini	Italy	36.89	6:22.31	1:46.36	—	110.574	—
15	Patrick Beckert	Germany	37.59	6:15.99	1:46.24	—	110.602	—
16	Antoine Gélinas-Beaulieu	Canada	35.53	6:43.35	1:44.93	—	110.841	—
17	Jordan Belchos	Canada	37.51	6:17.90	1:46.69	—	110.863	—
18	Francesco Betti	Italy	36.15	6:34.97	1:46.98	—	111.307	—
19	Vitaly Mikhailov	Belarus	37.24	6:23.54	1:47.38	—	111.387	—
20	Sergey Trofimov	Russia	37.10	6:26.92	1:48.77	—	112.048	—
21	Lukas Mann	Germany	36.86	6:36.46	1:47.07	—	112.196	—
22	Viktor Hald Thorup	Denmark	38.45	6:18.25	1:48.29	—	112.371	—
23	Michele Malfatti	Italy	38.37	6:25.71	1:48.72	—	113.181	—
24	Ethan Cepuran	United States	37.06	6:44.81	1:49.49	—	114.037	—
