= 2018 European Speed Skating Championships – Men's 5000 metres =

Men's 5000 metres at the 2018 European Speed Skating Championships
- Venue: Kolomna Speed Skating Center
- Location: Kolomna, Russia
- Dates: 6 January
- Competitors: 18 from 9 nations
- Winning time: 6:16.85

Medalists
gold medal	Nicola Tumolero	Italy
silver medal	Aleksandr Rumyantsev	Russia
bronze medal	Marcel Bosker	Netherlands

The men's 5000 metres competition at the 2018 European Speed Skating Championships was held on 6 January 2018.

== Results ==
The race was started at 17:36.

Rank	Pair	Lane	Name	Country	Time	Diff
1st place, gold medalist(s)	7	o	Nicola Tumolero	Italy	6:16.85	
2nd place, silver medalist(s)	6	o	Aleksandr Rumyantsev	Russia	6:18.13	+1.28
3rd place, bronze medalist(s)	8	o	Marcel Bosker	Netherlands	6:20.45	+3.60
4	9	o	Jan Blokhuijsen	Netherlands	6:21.97	+5.12
5	7	i	Danila Semerikov	Russia	6:24.14	+7.29
6	4	i	Davide Ghiotto	Italy	6:29.08	+12.23
7	5	i	Simon Schouten	Netherlands	6:30.08	+13.23
8	1	i	Linus Heidegger	Austria	6:31.87	+15.02
9	1	o	Fredrik van der Horst	Norway	6:32.41	+15.56
10	6	i	Vitaly Mikhailov	Belarus	6:36.06	+19.21
11	2	i	Sebastian Druszkiewicz	Czech Republic	6:36.67	+19.82
12	2	o	Magnus Bakken Haugli	Norway	6:36.72	+19.87
13	9	i	Danil Sinitsyn	Russia	6:37.08	+20.23
14	5	o	Jan Szymański	Poland	6:37.36	+20.51
15	8	i	Andrea Giovannini	Italy	6:40.65	+23.80
16	4	o	Adrian Wielgat	Poland	6:47.39	+30.54
17	3	i	Hallgeir Engebråten	Norway	6:53.72	+36.87
18	3	o	Jordan McMillen	Belgium	6:58.25	+41.40
