= 2020 World Allround Speed Skating Championships – Men =

Men at the 2020 World Allround Speed Skating Championships
- Venue: Vikingskipet
- Location: Hamar, Norway
- Dates: 29 February – 1 March
- Competitors: 24 from 11 nations
- Winning points: 147.880

Medalists
gold medal	Patrick Roest	Netherlands
silver medal	Sverre Lunde Pedersen	Norway
bronze medal	Seitaro Ichinohe	Japan

The men's competition at the 2020 World Allround Speed Skating Championships was held on 29 February and 1 March 2020.

== Results ==
=== 500 m ===
The race was started on 28 February at 12:25.

Rank	Pair	Lane	Name	Country	Time	Diff
1	11	I	Seitaro Ichinohe	Japan	36.17	
2	9	O	Tyson Langelaar	Canada	36.29	+0.12
3	10	I	Shane Williamson	Japan	36.31	+0.14
4	11	O	Marcin Bachanek	Poland	36.32	+0.15
5	3	O	Sverre Lunde Pedersen	Norway	36.37	+0.20
6	7	I	Håvard Bøkko	Norway	36.45	+0.28
7	12	O	Patrick Roest	Netherlands	36.52	+0.35
8	12	I	Jan Blokhuijsen	Netherlands	36.64	+0.47
8	9	I	Alemasi Kahanbai	China	36.64	+0.47
10	6	I	Hallgeir Engebråten	Norway	36.71	+0.54
11	1	I	Riku Tsuchiya	Japan	36.74	+0.57
12	10	O	Daniil Beliaev	Russia	36.86	+0.69
13	8	I	Livio Wenger	Switzerland	36.98	+0.81
14	6	O	Sergey Trofimov	Russia	37.00	+0.83
15	8	O	Bart Swings	Belgium	37.01	+0.84
16	5	I	Andrea Giovannini	Italy	37.20	+1.03
17	1	O	Demyan Gavrilov	Kazakhstan	37.22	+1.05
18	2	I	Vitaliy Schigolev	Kazakhstan	37.40	+1.23
19	4	I	Sven Kramer	Netherlands	37.49	+1.32
20	3	I	Dmitry Morozov	Kazakhstan	37.58	+1.41
21	7	O	Ted-Jan Bloemen	Canada	37.96	+1.79
22	5	O	Ruslan Zakharov	Russia	38.19	+2.02
23	4	O	Jordan Belchos	Canada	38.35	+2.18
24	2	O	Davide Ghiotto	Italy	39.31	+3.14

=== 5000 m ===
The race was started on 29 February at 16:08.

Rank	Pair	Lane	Name	Country	Time	Diff
1	10	O	Patrick Roest	Netherlands	6:14.35	
2	9	O	Sverre Lunde Pedersen	Norway	6:19.40	+5.05
3	12	I	Jordan Belchos	Canada	6:20.76	+6.41
4	10	I	Sergey Trofimov	Russia	6:21.95	+7.60
5	11	O	Ted-Jan Bloemen	Canada	6:22.82	+8.47
6	11	I	Ruslan Zakharov	Russia	6:22.92	+8.57
7	6	I	Jan Blokhuijsen	Netherlands	6:22.93	+8.58
8	7	I	Seitaro Ichinohe	Japan	6:24.63	+10.28
9	9	I	Sven Kramer	Netherlands	6:25.54	+11.19
10	6	O	Vitaliy Schigolev	Kazakhstan	6:26.13	+11.78
1	5	O	Bart Swings	Belgium	6:26.74	+12.39
112	8	O	Riku Tsuchiya	Japan	6:26.76	+12.41
13	3	I	Håvard Bøkko	Norway	6:28.85	+14.50
14	12	O	Davide Ghiotto	Italy	6:29.96	+15.61
15	3	O	Hallgeir Engebråten	Norway	6:30.04	+15.69
16	2	O	Shane Williamson	Japan	6:30.12	+15.77
17	5	I	Livio Wenger	Switzerland	6:32.98	+18.63
18	8	I	Dmitry Morozov	Kazakhstan	6:36.48	+22.13
19	7	O	Andrea Giovannini	Italy	6.37.96	+23.61
20	4	O	Daniil Beliaev	Russia	6:38.84	+24.49
21	2	I	Tyson Langelaar	Canada	6:39.72	+25.37
22	1	I	Alemasi Kahanbai	China	6:41.55	+27.20
23	1	O	Demyan Gavrilov	Kazakhstan	6:42.92	+28.57
24	4	I	Marcin Bachanek	Poland	6:53.22	+38.87

=== 1500 m ===
The race was started on 1 March at 13:52.

Rank	Pair	Lane	Name	Country	Time	Diff
1	11	I	Patrick Roest	Netherlands	1:44.41	
2	11	O	Sverre Lunde Pedersen	Norway	1:45.02	+0.61
3	10	I	Seitaro Ichinohe	Japan	1:45.85	+1.44
4	10	O	Jan Blokhuijsen	Netherlands	1:45.97	+1.56
5	4	O	Daniil Beliaev	Russia	1:46.09	+1.68
6	7	I	Bart Swings	Belgium	1:46.14	+1.73
7	7	O	Hallgeir Engebråten	Norway	1:46.18	+1.77
8	9	O	Shane Williamson	Japan	1:46.27	+1.86
9	9	I	Sergey Trofimov	Russia	1:46.28	+1.87
10	8	O	Riku Tsuchiya	Japan	1:46.42	+2.01
11	6	O	Tyson Langelaar	Canada	1:46.48	+2.07
12	4	I	Livio Wenger	Switzerland	1:46.76	+2.35
13	5	O	Jordan Belchos	Canada	1:47.68	+3.27
14	2	I	Alemasi Kahanbai	China	1:48.02	+3.61
15	3	I	Ruslan Zakharov	Russia	1:48.40	+3.99
16	5	I	Ted-Jan Bloemen	Canada	1:48.50	+4.09
17	3	O	Demyan Gavrilov	Kazakhstan	1:48.61	+4.20
18	6	I	Vitaliy Schigolev	Kazakhstan	1:48.62	+4.21
19	8	I	Håvard Bøkko	Norway	1:49.20	+4.79
20	2	O	Marcin Bachanek	Poland	1:49.36	+4.95
21	1	I	Dmitry Morozov	Kazakhstan	1:50.17	+5.76
–	–		Andrea Giovannini	Italy	Withdrawn	
–	–		Sven Kramer	Netherlands	Withdrawn	
–	–		Davide Ghiotto	Italy	Withdrawn	

=== 10000 m ===
The race was started on 1 March at 15:33.

Rank	Pair	Lane	Name	Country	Time	Diff
1	4	I	Patrick Roest	Netherlands	13:02.45	
2	3	O	Seitaro Ichinohe	Japan	13:07.88	+5.43
3	2	O	Sergey Trofimov	Russia	13:10.47	+8.02
4	1	I	Ted-Jan Bloemen	Canada	13:10.95	+8.50
5	3	I	Jan Blokhuijsen	Netherlands	13:12.38	+9.93
5	2	I	Jordan Belchos	Canada	13:15.01	+12.56
7	4	O	Sverre Lunde Pedersen	Norway	13:19.22	+16.77
8	1	O	Shane Williamson	Japan	13:39.33	+36.88

=== Overall standings ===
After all events.

Rank	Name	Country	500m	5000m	1500m	10000m	Points	Diff
1st place, gold medalist(s)	Patrick Roest	Netherlands	36.52	6:14.35	1:44.41	13:02.45	147.880	
2nd place, silver medalist(s)	Sverre Lunde Pedersen	Norway	36.37	6:19.40	1:45.02	13:19.22	149.277	+1.40
3rd place, bronze medalist(s)	Seitaro Ichinohe	Japan	36.17	6:24.63	1:45.85	13:07.88	149.310	+1.43
4	Jan Blokhuijsen	Netherlands	36.64	6:22.93	1:45.97	13:12.38	149.875	+2.00
5	Sergey Trofimov	Russia	37.00	6:21.95	1:46.28	13:10.47	150.144	+2.27
6	Shane Williamson	Japan	36.31	6:30.12	1:46.27	13:39.33	151.711	+3.84
7	Ted-Jan Bloemen	Canada	37.96	6:22.82	1:48.50	13:10.95	151.955	+4.08
8	Jordan Belchos	Canada	38.35	6:20.76	1:47.68	13:15.01	152.069	+4.19
9	Riku Tsuchiya	Japan	36.74	6:26.76	1:46.42	—	110.889	—
10	Bart Swings	Belgium	37.01	6:26.74	1:46.14	—	111.064	—
11	Hallgeir Engebråten	Norway	36.71	6:30.04	1:46.18	—	111.107	—
12	Håvard Bøkko	Norway	36.45	6:28.85	1:49.20	—	111.735	—
13	Tyson Langelaar	Canada	36.29	6:39.72	1:46.48	—	111.755	—
14	Livio Wenger	Switzerland	36.98	6:32.98	1:46.76	—	111.864	—
15	Daniil Beliaev	Russia	36.86	6:38.84	1:46.09	—	112.107	—
16	Vitaliy Schigolev	Kazakhstan	37.40	6:26.13	1:48.62	—	112.219	—
17	Ruslan Zakharov	Russia	38.19	6:22.92	1:48.40	—	112.615	—
18	Alemasi Kahanbai	China	36.64	6:41.55	1:48.02	—	112.801	—
19	Demyan Gavrilov	Kazakhstan	37.22	6:42.92	1:48.61	—	113.715	—
20	Dmitry Morozov	Kazakhstan	37.58	6:36.48	1:50.17	—	113.951	—
21	Marcin Bachanek	Poland	36.32	6:53.22	1:49.36	—	114.095	—
	Andrea Giovannini	Italy	37.20	6:37.96	Did not start	—	Did not finish	
	Sven Kramer	Netherlands	37.49	6:25.54	Did not start	—	Did not finish	
	Davide Ghiotto	Italy	39.31	6:29.96	Did not start	—	Did not finish	
