= 2023 World Single Distances Speed Skating Championships – Men's 5000 metres =

Men's 5000 metres at the 2023 World Single Distances Speed Skating Championships
- Venue: Thialf
- Location: Heerenveen, Netherlands
- Date: 2 March
- Competitors: 20 from 10 nations
- Winning time: 6:08.94

Medalists
gold medal	Patrick Roest	Netherlands
silver medal	Davide Ghiotto	Italy
bronze medal	Bart Swings	Belgium

The Men's 5000 metres competition at the 2023 World Single Distances Speed Skating Championships was held on 2 March 2023.

== Results ==
The race was started at 19:35.

Rank	Pair	Lane	Name	Country	Time	Diff
1st place, gold medalist(s)	9	o	Patrick Roest	Netherlands	6:08.94	
2nd place, silver medalist(s)	8	i	Davide Ghiotto	Italy	6:11.12	+2.18
3rd place, bronze medalist(s)	9	i	Bart Swings	Belgium	6:13.06	+4.12
4	4	i	Jorrit Bergsma	Netherlands	6:13.51	+4.57
5	3	i	Marcel Bosker	Netherlands	6:15.35	+6.41
6	8	o	Seitaro Ichinohe	Japan	6:21.41	+12.47
7	1	o	Sverre Lunde Pedersen	Norway	6:21.83	+12.89
8	7	o	Hallgeir Engebråten	Norway	6:22.44	+13.50
9	5	i	Sigurd Henriksen	Norway	6:24.64	+15.70
10	10	i	Ryosuke Tsuchiya	Japan	6:25.40	+16.46
11	5	o	Felix Rijhnen	Germany	6:25.65	+16.71
12	6	o	Ethan Cepuran	United States	6:26.09	+17.15
13	10	o	Graeme Fish	Canada	6:26.17	+17.23
14	6	i	Casey Dawson	United States	6:26.28	+17.34
15	4	o	Andrea Giovannini	Italy	6:26.52	+17.58
16	7	i	Riku Tsuchiya	Japan	6:26.98	+18.04
17	2	i	Jordan Belchos	Canada	6:28.54	+19.60
18	1	i	Ted-Jan Bloemen	Canada	6:28.99	+20.05
19	2	o	Timothy Loubineaud	France	6:36.53	+27.59
20	3	o	Vitaliy Chshigolev	Kazakhstan	6:37.55	+28.61
