= 2020 World Single Distances Speed Skating Championships – Men's team pursuit =

Men's team pursuit at the 2020 World Single Distances Speed Skating Championships
- Venue: Utah Olympic Oval
- Location: Salt Lake City, United States
- Dates: February 15
- Competitors: 24 from 8 nations
- Teams: 8
- Winning time: 3:34.68

Medalists
gold medal	Sven Kramer; Douwe de Vries; Marcel Bosker	Netherlands
silver medal	Seitaro Ichinohe; Riku Tsuchiya; Shane Williamson	Japan
bronze medal	Sergey Trofimov; Ruslan Zakharov; Danila Semerikov	Russia

The Men's team pursuit competition at the 2020 World Single Distances Speed Skating Championships was held on February 15, 2020.

== Results ==
The race was started at 15:18.

Rank	Pair	Lane	Country	Time	Diff
1st place, gold medalist(s)	2	c	Netherlands; Sven Kramer; Marcel Bosker; Douwe de Vries	3:34.68; WR	
2nd place, silver medalist(s)	3	s	Japan; Seitaro Ichinohe; Riku Tsuchiya; Shane Williamson	3:36.41	+1.73
3rd place, bronze medalist(s)	4	c	Russia; Sergey Trofimov; Ruslan Zakharov; Danila Semerikov	3:37.24	+2.56
4	4	s	Canada; Ted-Jan Bloemen; Jordan Belchos; Tyson Langelaar	3:38.27	+3.59
5	1	c	United States; Emery Lehman; Ethan Cepuran; Ian Quinn	3:38.51	+3.83
6	3	c	Italy; Andrea Giovannini; Nicola Tumolero; Michele Malfatti	3:38.96	+4.28
7	2	s	Norway; Sverre Lunde Pedersen; Hallgeir Engebråten; Håvard Bøkko	3:41.22	+6.54
8	1	s	New Zealand; Peter Michael; Josh Whyte; Kierryn Hughes	3:44.78	+10.10
