= 2021 World Single Distances Speed Skating Championships – Men's team pursuit =

Men's team pursuit at the 2021 World Single Distances Speed Skating Championships
- Venue: Thialf
- Location: Heerenveen, Netherlands
- Date: 12 February
- Competitors: 24 from 8 nations
- Teams: 8
- Winning time: 3:41.429

Medalists
| gold medal | Beau Snellink; Marcel Bosker; Patrick Roest | Netherlands |
| silver medal | Ted-Jan Bloemen; Jordan Belchos; Connor Howe | Canada |
| bronze medal | Sergey Trofimov; Ruslan Zakharov; Danila Semerikov |

The Men's team pursuit competition at the 2021 World Single Distances Speed Skating Championships was held on 12 February 2021.

== Results ==
The race was started at 15:37.

| Rank | Pair | Lane | Country | Time | Diff |
|---|---|---|---|---|---|
| 1st place, gold medalist(s) | 3 | c | Netherlands; Beau Snellink; Marcel Bosker; Patrick Roest | 3:41.429 | |
| 2nd place, silver medalist(s) | 3 | s | Canada; Ted-Jan Bloemen; Jordan Belchos; Connor Howe | 3:41.711 | +0.28 |
| 3rd place, bronze medalist(s) | 4 | c | Russian Skating Union; Sergey Trofimov; Ruslan Zakharov; Danila Semerikov | 3:42.662 | +1.23 |
| 4 | 4 | s | Norway; Hallgeir Engebråten; Allan Dahl Johansson; Sverre Lunde Pedersen | 3:43.231 | +1.80 |
| 5 | 2 | s | Italy; Francesco Betti; Andrea Giovannini; Michele Malfatti | 3:45.697 | +4.26 |
| 6 | 2 | c | Kazakhstan; Vitaliy Chshigolev; Dmitry Morozov; Demyan Gavrilov | 3:48.448 | +7.01 |
| 7 | 1 | s | New Zealand; Peter Michael; Josh Whyte; Kierryn Hughes | 3:51.083 | +9.56 |
| 8 | 1 | c | Poland; Marcin Bachanek; Artur Janicki; Szymon Palka | 4:21.864 | +40.43 |
