= 2021 World Single Distances Speed Skating Championships – Men's 1500 metres =

Men's 1500 metres at the 2021 World Single Distances Speed Skating Championships
- Venue: Thialf
- Location: Heerenveen, Netherlands
- Date: 14 February
- Competitors: 24 from 13 nations
- Winning time: 1:43.752

Medalists
gold medal	Thomas Krol	Netherlands
silver medal	Kjeld Nuis	Netherlands
bronze medal	Patrick Roest	Netherlands

The Men's 1500 metres competition at the 2021 World Single Distances Speed Skating Championships was held on 14 February 2021.

== Results ==
The race was started at 13:36.

Rank	Pair	Lane	Name	Country	Time	Diff
1st place, gold medalist(s)	12	i	Thomas Krol	Netherlands	1:43.752	
2nd place, silver medalist(s)	10	o	Kjeld Nuis	Netherlands	1:44.110	+0.36
3rd place, bronze medalist(s)	11	o	Patrick Roest	Netherlands	1:45.493	+1.74
4	7	o	Sergey Trofimov	Russian Skating Union	1:45.514	+1.76
5	9	o	Joey Mantia	United States	1:45.681	+1.93
6	8	i	Connor Howe	Canada	1:45.860	+2.11
7	12	o	Bart Swings	Belgium	1:45.873	+2.12
8	7	i	Allan Dahl Johansson	Norway	1:46.440	+2.69
9	11	i	Sverre Lunde Pedersen	Norway	1:46.492	+2.74
10	10	i	Hallgeir Engebråten	Norway	1:47.146	+3.39
11	5	i	Daniil Beliaev	Russian Skating Union	1:47.547	+3.79
12	1	o	Stefan Emele	Germany	1:47.609	+3.85
13	6	o	Demyan Gavrilov	Kazakhstan	1:47.808	+4.05
14	4	o	Vitaliy Chshigolev	Kazakhstan	1:48.155	+4.40
15	9	i	Andrea Giovannini	Italy	1:48.239	+4.48
16	2	i	Dmitry Morozov	Kazakhstan	1:48.337	+4.58
17	4	i	Francesco Betti	Italy	1:48.349	+4.59
18	3	i	Cornelius Kersten	Great Britain	1:48.457	+4.70
19	6	i	Aleksandr Podolskii	Russian Skating Union	1:48.548	+4.79
20	3	o	Victor Rudenko	Belarus	1:48.661	+4.91
21	5	o	Conor McDermott-Mostowy	United States	1:48.835	+5.08
22	2	o	Ethan Cepuran	United States	1:49.108	+5.35
23	8	o	Gabriel Odor	Austria	1:49.475	+5.72
24	1	i	Marcin Bachanek	Poland	1:49.581	+5.83
