= 2022 World Allround Speed Skating Championships – Men =

Men at the 2022 World Allround Speed Skating Championships
- Venue: Vikingskipet
- Location: Hamar, Norway
- Dates: 5–6 March
- Competitors: 20 from 9 nations
- Winning points: 148.696

Medalists
gold medal	Nils van der Poel	Sweden
silver medal	Patrick Roest	Netherlands
bronze medal	Bart Swings	Belgium

The Men competition at the 2022 World Allround Speed Skating Championships was held on 5 and 6 March 2022.

== Results ==
=== 500 m ===
The race was started on 5 March at 14:26.

Rank	Pair	Lane	Name	Country	Time	Diff
1	3	I	Dmitry Morozov	Kazakhstan	36.12	
2	5	O	Riku Tsuchiya	Japan	36.40	+0.28
3	7	O	Peder Kongshaug	Norway	36.40	+0.28
4	8	O	Patrick Roest	Netherlands	36.44	+0.32
5	2	I	Shane Williamson	Japan	36.64	+0.52
6	8	I	Kristian Ulekleiv	Norway	36.77	+0.65
7	3	O	Masahito Obayashi	Japan	36.87	+0.75
8	5	I	Sander Eitrem	Norway	36.92	+0.80
9	6	I	Casey Dawson	United States	37.01	+0.89
10	7	I	Andrea Giovannini	Italy	37.07	+0.95
11	10	I	Bart Swings	Belgium	37.09	+0.97
12	10	O	Emery Lehman	United States	37.10	+0.98
13	9	O	Marcel Bosker	Netherlands	37.21	+1.09
14	6	O	Nils van der Poel	Sweden	37.33	+1.21
15	1	O	Chris Huizinga	Netherlands	37.68	+1.56
16	9	I	Ethan Cepuran	United States	37.80	+1.68
17	1	I	Ted-Jan Bloemen	Canada	37.93	+1.81
18	4	O	Davide Ghiotto	Italy	38.31	+2.19
19	4	I	Michele Malfatti	Italy	38.45	+2.33
20	2	O	Jordan Belchos	Canada	38.46	+2.34

=== 5000 m ===
The race was started on 5 March at 16:11.

Rank	Pair	Lane	Name	Country	Time	Diff
1	8	I	Nils van der Poel	Sweden	6:12.45	
2	7	O	Patrick Roest	Netherlands	6:15.99	+3.54
3	8	O	Davide Ghiotto	Italy	6:19.84	+7.39
4	9	I	Ethan Cepuran	United States	6:22.47	+10.02
5	5	O	Michele Malfatti	Italy	6:22.67	+10.22
6	10	O	Bart Swings	Belgium	6:23.25	+10.80
7	7	I	Marcel Bosker	Netherlands	6:24.07	+11.62
8	6	I	Sander Eitrem	Norway	6:24.72	+12.27
9	3	O	Peder Kongshaug	Norway	6:24.74	+12.29
10	3	I	Emery Lehman	United States	6:25.51	+13.06
11	9	O	Casey Dawson	United States	6:26.15	+13.70
12	4	O	Riku Tsuchiya	Japan	6:27.58	+15.13
13	4	I	Jordan Belchos	Canada	6:28.06	+15.61
14	1	I	Kristian Ulekleiv	Norway	6:28.38	+15.93
15	1	O	Chris Huizinga	Netherlands	6:28.86	+16.41
16	10	I	Ted-Jan Bloemen	Canada	6:31.52	+19.07
17	6	O	Andrea Giovannini	Italy	6:31.56	+19.11
18	5	I	Shane Williamson	Japan	6:38.57	+26.12
19	2	I	Masahito Obayashi	Japan	6:40.65	+28.20
20	2	O	Dmitry Morozov	Kazakhstan	6:49.81	+37.36

=== 1500 m ===
The race was started on 6 March at 14:46.

Rank	Pair	Lane	Name	Country	Time	Diff
1	8	O	Bart Swings	Belgium	1:46.03	
2	10	I	Patrick Roest	Netherlands	1:46.48	+0.45
3	6	O	Emery Lehman	United States	1:46.72	+0.69
4	9	I	Peder Kongshaug	Norway	1:47.16	+1.13
5	7	O	Marcel Bosker	Netherlands	1:47.49	+1.46
6	8	I	Sander Eitrem	Norway	1:47.75	+1.72
7	4	O	Shane Williamson	Japan	1:48.03	+2.00
8	9	O	Riku Tsuchiya	Japan	1:48.06	+2.03
9	6	I	Casey Dawson	United States	1:48.11	+2.08
10	10	O	Nils van der Poel	Sweden	1:48.13	+2.10
11	1	I	Dmitry Morozov	Kazakhstan	1:48.17	+2.14
12	3	O	Michele Malfatti	Italy	1:48.53	+2.50
13	5	I	Ethan Cepuran	United States	1:48.71	+2.68
14	3	I	Chris Huizinga	Netherlands	1:48.84	+2.80
15	4	I	Davide Ghiotto	Italy	1:49.44	+3.41
16	2	I	Masahito Obayashi	Japan	1:49.89	+3.86
17	1	O	Jordan Belchos	Canada	1:50.36	+4.33
—	5	O	Andrea Giovannini	Italy	Withdrawn	
—	7	I	Kristian Ulekleiv	Norway	Withdrawn	
—	2	O	Ted-Jan Bloemen	Canada	Withdrawn	

=== 10000 m ===
The race was started on 6 March at 16:21.

Rank	Pair	Lane	Name	Country	Time	Diff
1	3	I	Nils van der Poel	Sweden	12:41.56	
2	3	O	Bart Swings	Belgium	13:09.21	+27.65
3	1	O	Davide Ghiotto	Italy	13:12.92	+31.36
4	2	O	Sander Eitrem	Norway	13:20.40	+38.84
5	4	I	Patrick Roest	Netherlands	13:26.08	+44.52
6	4	O	Peder Kongshaug	Norway	13:30.09	+48.53
7	2	I	Riku Tsuchiya	Japan	13:35.62	+54.06
8	1	I	Ethan Cepuran	United States	13:38.32	+56.76

=== Overall standings ===
After all races.

Rank	Name	Country	Points	Diff
1st place, gold medalist(s)	Nils van der Poel	Sweden	148.696	
2nd place, silver medalist(s)	Patrick Roest	Netherlands	149.836	
3rd place, bronze medalist(s)	Bart Swings	Belgium	150.218	
4	Peder Kongshaug	Norway	151.098	
5	Sander Eitrem	Norway	151.328	
6	Riku Tsuchiya	Japan	151.959	
7	Davide Ghiotto	Italy	152.420	
8	Ethan Cepuran	United States	153.199	
9	Emery Lehman	United States	111.224	
10	Marcel Bosker	Netherlands	111.447	
11	Casey Dawson	United States	111.661	
12	Shane Williamson	Japan	112.507	
13	Chris Huizinga	Netherlands	112.842	
14	Michele Malfatti	Italy	112.893	
15	Dmitry Morozov	Kazakhstan	113.157	
16	Masahito Obayashi	Japan	113.565	
17	Jordan Belchos	Canada	114.052	
—	Andrea Giovannini	Italy	Withdrawn	
—	Kristian Ulekleiv	Norway	Withdrawn	
—	Ted-Jan Bloemen	Canada	Withdrawn	
