= 2020 European Speed Skating Championships – Men's 1500 metres =

Men's 1500 metres at the 2020 European Speed Skating Championships
- Venue: Thialf
- Location: Heerenveen, Netherlands
- Dates: 10 January
- Competitors: 20 from 11 nations
- Winning time: 1:43.67

Medalists
gold medal	Thomas Krol	Netherlands
silver medal	Denis Yuskov	Russia
bronze medal	Patrick Roest	Netherlands

The men's 1500 metres competition at the 2020 European Speed Skating Championships was held on 10 January 2020.

== Results ==
The race was started at 20:29.

Rank	Pair	Lane	Name	Country	Time	Diff
1st place, gold medalist(s)	9	i	Thomas Krol	Netherlands	1:43.67	
2nd place, silver medalist(s)	8	i	Denis Yuskov	Russia	1:44.80	+1.13
3rd place, bronze medalist(s)	10	i	Patrick Roest	Netherlands	1:44.82	+1.15
4	10	o	Sverre Lunde Pedersen	Norway	1:45.43	+1.76
5	8	o	Koen Verweij	Netherlands	1:45.88	+2.21
6	9	o	Sindre Henriksen	Norway	1:46.27	+2.60
7	5	o	Livio Wenger	Switzerland	1:46.46	+2.79
8	7	o	Bart Swings	Belgium	1:46.76	+3.09
9	5	i	Mathias Vosté	Belgium	1:47.02	+3.35
10	6	o	Håvard Bøkko	Norway	1:47.16	+3.49
11	6	i	Sergey Trofimov	Russia	1:47.56	+3.89
12	3	i	Marcin Bachanek	Poland	1:47.59	+3.92
13	2	o	Andrea Giovannini	Italy	1:47.65	+3.98
14	4	i	Stefan Emele	Germany	1:47.91	+4.24
15	4	o	Francesco Betti	Italy	1:48.28	+4.61
16	3	o	Alessio Trentini	Italy	1:48.47	+4.80
17	7	i	Haralds Silovs	Latvia	1:48.50	+4.83
18	2	i	Gabriel Odor	Austria	1:49.46	+5.79
19	1	o	Sebastian Kłosiński	Poland	1:49.47	+5.80
20	1	i	Vitaly Mikhailov	Belarus	1:52.16	+8.49
