= 2024 European Speed Skating Championships – Men's 5000 metres =

Men's 5000 metres at the 2024 European Speed Skating Championships
- Venue: Thialf
- Location: Heerenveen, Netherlands
- Dates: 6 January
- Competitors: 16 from 8 nations
- Winning time: 6:05.93

Medalists
gold medal	Patrick Roest	Netherlands
silver medal	Davide Ghiotto	Italy
bronze medal	Sander Eitrem	Norway

The men's 5000 metres competition at the 2024 European Speed Skating Championships was held on 6 January 2024.

== Results ==
The race was started at 15:29.

Rank	Pair	Lane	Name	Country	Time	Diff
1st place, gold medalist(s)	7	i	Patrick Roest	Netherlands	6:05.93	
2nd place, silver medalist(s)	7	o	Davide Ghiotto	Italy	6:08.27	+2.34
3rd place, bronze medalist(s)	5	i	Sander Eitrem	Norway	6:09.28	+3.35
4	3	i	Chris Huizinga	Netherlands	6:13.59	+7.66
5	6	i	Bart Swings	Belgium	6:16.25	+10.32
6	8	i	Sverre Lunde Pedersen	Norway	6:16.37	+10.44
7	6	o	Timothy Loubineaud	France	6:16.61	+10.68
8	5	o	Marcel Bosker	Netherlands	6:18.75	+12.82
9	1	o	Kristian Gamme Ulekleiv	Norway	6:20.72	+14.79
10	8	o	Michele Malfatti	Italy	6:22.30	+16.37
11	2	i	Riccardo Lorello	Italy	6:24.49	+18.56
12	4	i	Fridtjof Petzold	Germany	6:24.54	+18.61
13	4	o	Livio Wenger	Switzerland	6:25.55	+19.62
14	2	o	Gabriel Groß	Germany	6:29.37	+23.44
15	1	i	Szymon Palka	Poland	6:37.60	+31.67
16	3	o	Paul Galczinsky	Germany	6:37.79	+31.86
