= 2018 European Speed Skating Championships – Men's team pursuit =

Men's team pursuit at the 2018 European Speed Skating Championships
- Venue: Kolomna Speed Skating Center
- Location: Kolomna, Russia
- Dates: 7 January
- Competitors: 15 from 5 nations
- Teams: 5
- Winning time: 3:42.79

Medalists
gold medal	Jan Blokhuijsen; Marcel Bosker; Simon Schouten	Netherlands
silver medal	Sergey Gryaztsov; Aleksandr Rumyantsev; Danila Semerikov	Russia
bronze medal	Zbigniew Brodka; Jan Szymański; Adrian Wielgat	Poland

The men's team pursuit competition at the 2018 European Speed Skating Championships was held on 7 January 2018.

== Results ==
The race was started at 16:19.

Rank	Pair	Lane	Country	Time	Diff
1st place, gold medalist(s)	2	c	Netherlands; Jan Blokhuijsen; Marcel Bosker; Simon Schouten	3:42.79	
2nd place, silver medalist(s)	1	s	Russia; Sergey Gryaztsov; Aleksandr Rumyantsev; Danila Semerikov	3:44.59	+1.80
3rd place, bronze medalist(s)	2	s	Poland; Zbigniew Brodka; Jan Szymański; Adrian Wielgat	3:52.60	+9.81
4	3	s	Norway; Magnus Bakken Haugli; Runar Njåtun Krøyer; Fredrik van der Horst	3:53.02	+10.23
5	3	c	Italy; Andrea Giovannini; Michele Malfatti; Nicola Tumolero	3:53.08	+10.29
