= 2020 European Speed Skating Championships – Men's mass start =

Men's mass start at the 2020 European Speed Skating Championships
- Venue: Thialf
- Location: Heerenveen, Netherlands
- Dates: 12 January
- Competitors: 23 from 14 nations
- Winning points: 60

Medalists
gold medal	Bart Swings	Belgium
silver medal	Arjan Stroetinga	Netherlands
bronze medal	Danila Semerikov	Russia

The men's mass start competition at the 2020 European Speed Skating Championships was held on 12 January 2020.

== Results ==
The race was started at 17:20.

Rank	Name	Country	Points	Time
1st place, gold medalist(s)	Bart Swings	Belgium	60	7:39.97
2nd place, silver medalist(s)	Arjan Stroetinga	Netherlands	40	7:40.08
3rd place, bronze medalist(s)	Danila Semerikov	Russia	20	7:40.34
4	Andrea Giovannini	Italy	10	7:40.62
5	Ruslan Zakharov	Russia	7	7:40.89
6	Michele Malfatti	Italy	4	7:44.75
7	Haralds Silovs	Latvia	3	7:41.54
8	Vitaly Mikhailov	Belarus	3	7:42.24
9	Timothy Loubineaud	France	3	7:44.21
10	Marcin Bachanek	Poland	3	8:06.67
11	Fridtjof Petzold	Germany	2	7:48.81
12	Armin Hager	Austria	2	7:51.92
13	Gabriel Odor	Austria	0	7:42.69
14	Artur Janicki	Poland	0	7:43.12
15	Yahor Damaratski	Belarus	0	7:45.39
16	Philip Due Schmidt	Denmark	0	7:47.94
17	Felix Maly	Germany	0	8:05.48
18	Livio Wenger	Switzerland	0	8:09.96
19	Jorrit Bergsma	Netherlands	0	8:28.12
20	Botond Bejczi	Hungary	0	DNF
21	Bence Dékány	Hungary	0	DNF
22	Stefan Due Schmidt	Denmark	0	DNF
23	Cornelius Kersten	Great Britain	0	DNF
