= 2023 World Single Distances Speed Skating Championships – Men's 10000 metres =

Men's 10000 metres at the 2023 World Single Distances Speed Skating Championships
- Venue: Thialf
- Location: Heerenveen, Netherlands
- Date: 5 March
- Competitors: 12 from 7 nations
- Winning time: 12:41.35

Medalists
| gold medal | Davide Ghiotto | Italy |
| silver medal | Jorrit Bergsma | Netherlands |
| bronze medal | Ted-Jan Bloemen | Canada |

The Men's 10000 metres competition at the 2023 World Single Distances Speed Skating Championships was held on 5 March 2023.

== Results ==
The race was started at 14:46.

| Rank | Pair | Lane | Name | Country | Time | Diff |
|---|---|---|---|---|---|---|
| 1st place, gold medalist(s) | 4 | o | Davide Ghiotto | Italy | 12:41.35 | |
| 2nd place, silver medalist(s) | 1 | o | Jorrit Bergsma | Netherlands | 12:55.64 | +14.29 |
| 3rd place, bronze medalist(s) | 2 | i | Ted-Jan Bloemen | Canada | 13:01.84 | +20.49 |
| 4 | 5 | i | Patrick Roest | Netherlands | 13:02.92 | +21.57 |
| 5 | 5 | o | Graeme Fish | Canada | 13:03.51 | +22.16 |
| 6 | 6 | o | Ryosuke Tsuchiya | Japan | 13:12.59 | +31.24 |
| 7 | 3 | i | Sigurd Henriksen | Norway | 13:14.77 | +33.42 |
| 8 | 3 | o | Andrea Giovannini | Italy | 13:18.41 | +37.06 |
| 9 | 4 | i | Takahiro Itō | Japan | 13:19.07 | +37.72 |
| 10 | 1 | i | Fridtjof Petzold | Germany | 13:21.39 | +40.04 |
| 11 | 2 | o | Casey Dawson | United States | 13:22.32 | +40.97 |
| — | 6 | i | Sander Eitrem | Norway | Did not finish | |
