= Ghiotto =

Ghiotto is an Italian surname. Notable people with the surname include:

- Davide Ghiotto (born 1993), Italian speed skater
- Luca Ghiotto (born 1995), Italian racing driver
