= 2019 World Single Distances Speed Skating Championships – Men's team pursuit =

Men's team pursuit at the 2019 World Single Distances Speed Skating Championships
- Venue: Max Aicher Arena
- Location: Inzell, Germany
- Dates: 8 February
- Competitors: 24 from 8 nations
- Teams: 8
- Winning time: 3:38.432

Medalists
| gold medal | Marcel Bosker; Sven Kramer; Douwe de Vries | Netherlands |
| silver medal | Håvard Bøkko; Sindre Henriksen; Sverre Lunde Pedersen | Norway |
| bronze medal | Aleksandr Rumyantsev; Danila Semerikov; Sergey Trofimov | Russia |

The Men's team pursuit competition at the 2019 World Single Distances Speed Skating Championships was held on 8 February 2019.

== Results ==
The race was started at 18:01.

| Rank | Pair | Lane | Country | Time | Diff |
|---|---|---|---|---|---|
| 1st place, gold medalist(s) | 3 | s | Netherlands | 3:38.43 | |
| 2nd place, silver medalist(s) | 3 | c | Norway | 3:40.80 | +2.37 |
| 3rd place, bronze medalist(s) | 4 | c | Russia | 3:41.31 | +2.88 |
| 4 | 4 | s | Japan | 3:41.96 | +3.53 |
| 5 | 1 | c | Canada | 3:43.04 | +4.61 |
| 6 | 2 | s | Italy | 3:44.18 | +5.75 |
| 7 | 2 | c | South Korea | 3:48.83 | +10.40 |
| 8 | 1 | s | Kazakhstan | 3:48.88 | +10.45 |
