= 2020 European Speed Skating Championships – Men's team pursuit =

Men's team pursuit at the 2020 European Speed Skating Championships
- Venue: Thialf
- Location: Heerenveen, Netherlands
- Dates: 12 January
- Competitors: 18 from 6 nations
- Teams: 6
- Winning time: 3:40.63

Medalists
gold medal	Marcel Bosker; Sven Kramer; Patrick Roest	Netherlands
silver medal	Aleksandr Rumyantsev; Danila Semerikov; Denis Yuskov	Russia
bronze medal	Håvard Bøkko; Hallgeir Engebråten; Sverre Lunde Pedersen	Norway

The men's team pursuit competition at the 2020 European Speed Skating Championships was held on 12 January 2020.

== Results ==
The race was started at 14:33.

Rank	Pair	Lane	Country	Time	Diff
1st place, gold medalist(s)	2	c	Netherlands; Marcel Bosker; Sven Kramer; Patrick Roest	3:40.63	
2nd place, silver medalist(s)	3	c	Russia; Aleksandr Rumyantsev; Danila Semerikov; Denis Yuskov	3:42.48	+1.85
3rd place, bronze medalist(s)	2	s	Norway; Håvard Bøkko; Hallgeir Engebråten; Sverre Lunde Pedersen	3:43.39	+2.76
4	3	s	Italy; Francesco Betti; Andrea Giovannini; Michele Malfatti	3:46.77	+6.14
5	1	c	Belarus; Yahor Damaratski; Ignat Golovatsiuk; Vitaly Mikhailov	3:49.78	+9.15
6	1	s	Poland; Marcin Bachanek; Artur Janicki; Szymon Pałka	3:49.99	+9.36
