= 2024 European Speed Skating Championships – Men's team pursuit =

Men's team pursuit at the 2024 European Speed Skating Championships
- Venue: Thialf
- Location: Heerenveen, Netherlands
- Dates: 5 January
- Competitors: 18 from 6 nations
- Teams: 6
- Winning time: 3:34.22

Medalists
gold medal	Sander Eitrem; Peder Kongshaug; Sverre Lunde Pedersen	Norway
silver medal	Andrea Giovannini; Davide Ghiotto; Michele Malfatti	Italy
bronze medal	Marcel Bosker; Chris Huizinga; Bart Hoolwerf	Netherlands

The men's team pursuit competition at the 2024 European Speed Skating Championships was held on 5 January 2024.

== Results ==
The race was started at 19:51.

Rank	Pair	Lane	Country	Time	Diff
1st place, gold medalist(s)	2	s	Norway; Sander Eitrem; Peder Kongshaug; Sverre Lunde Pedersen	3:34.22; WR	
2nd place, silver medalist(s)	3	s	Italy; Andrea Giovannini; Davide Ghiotto; Michele Malfatti	3:40.47	+6.25
3rd place, bronze medalist(s)	3	c	Netherlands; Marcel Bosker; Chris Huizinga; Bart Hoolwerf	3:41.36	+7.14
4	1	c	Poland; Marcin Bachanek; Artur Janicki; Szymon Pałka	3:45.74	+11.52
5	1	s	France; Timothy Loubineaud; Mathieu Belloir; Valentin Thiebault	3:45.82	+11.60
—	2	c	Belgium; Bart Swings; Indra Médard; Jason Suttels	Did not finish	
