= 2026 European Speed Skating Championships – Men's team pursuit =

Men's team pursuit at the 2026 European Speed Skating Championships
- Venue: Ice Arena
- Location: Tomaszów Mazowiecki, Poland
- Dates: 9 January
- Competitors: 18 from 6 nations
- Teams: 6
- Winning time: 3:40.96

Medalists
gold medal	Davide Ghiotto; Andrea Giovannini; Michele Malfatti	Italy
silver medal	Louis Hollaar; Wisse Slendebroek; Kars Jansman	Netherlands
bronze medal	Peder Kongshaug; Didrik Eng Strand; Sigurd Henriksen	Norway

The men's team pursuit competition at the 2026 European Speed Skating Championships was held on 9 January 2026.

== Results ==
The race started at 19:44.

Rank	Pair	Lane	Country	Time	Diff
1st place, gold medalist(s)	3	s	Italy; Davide Ghiotto; Andrea Giovannini; Michele Malfatti	3:40.96	
2nd place, silver medalist(s)	2	c	Netherlands; Louis Hollaar; Wisse Slendebroek; Kars Jansman	3:45.66	+4.70
3rd place, bronze medalist(s)	1	c	Norway; Peder Kongshaug; Didrik Eng Strand; Sigurd Henriksen	3:47.15	+6.19
4	2	s	France; Valentin Thiebault; Mathieu Belloir; Germain Deschamps	3:47.62	+6.66
5	1	s	Poland; Vladimir Semirunniy; Szymon Pałka; Marcin Bachanek	3:48.10	+7.14
6	3	c	Germany; Tom Rudolph; Tomy Nguyen; Luca Matteo Stibenz	3:53.00	+12.04
