= 2018 World Allround Speed Skating Championships =

Speed skating championship

- Location: Amsterdam, Netherlands
- Venue: Olympic Stadium
- Dates: 9–11 March
- Competitors: 46 from 15 nations

Medalist men
1st place, gold medalist(s)		Patrick Roest	Netherlands
2nd place, silver medalist(s)		Sverre Lunde Pedersen	Norway
3rd place, bronze medalist(s)		Marcel Bosker	Netherlands

Medalist women
1st place, gold medalist(s)		Miho Takagi	Japan
2nd place, silver medalist(s)		Ireen Wüst	Netherlands
3rd place, bronze medalist(s)		Annouk van der Weijden	Netherlands

The 2018 World Allround Speed Skating Championships were held at the Olympic Stadium in Amsterdam, Netherlands, from 9 to 11 March 2018.

== Schedule ==
All times are local (UTC+1).

Date	Time	Event
9 March	19:30	Women's 500 m
9 March	19:30	Women's 3000 m
10 March	16:15	Men's 500 m
10 March	16:15	Women's 1500 m
10 March	16:15	Men's 5000 m
10 March	16:15	Women's 5000 m
11 March	13:30	Men's 1500 m
11 March	13:30	Men's 10000 m

== Medal summary ==
=== Medal table ===
Rank	Nation	Gold	Silver	Bronze	Total
1	Netherlands (NED)	1	1	2	4
2	Japan (JPN)	1	0	0	1
3	Norway (NOR)	0	1	0	1
Totals (3 entries)		2	2	2	6

=== Medalists ===
Event	Gold		Silver		Bronze	
Men	Patrick Roest; Netherlands	154.547	Sverre Lunde Pedersen; Norway	154.941	Marcel Bosker; Netherlands	155.953
Women	Miho Takagi; Japan	166.905	Ireen Wüst; Netherlands	167.758	Annouk van der Weijden; Netherlands	169.840
