= 2022 European Speed Skating Championships – Men's team pursuit =

Men's team pursuit at the 2022 European Speed Skating Championships
- Venue: Thialf
- Location: Heerenveen, Netherlands
- Dates: 7 January
- Competitors: 15 from 5 nations
- Teams: 5
- Winning time: 3:37.97

Medalists
gold medal	Sven Kramer; Marcel Bosker; Patrick Roest	Netherlands
silver medal	Allan Dahl Johansson; Hallgeir Engebråten; Sverre Lunde Pedersen	Norway
bronze medal	Andrea Giovannini; Davide Ghiotto; Michele Malfatti	Italy

The men's team pursuit competition at the 2022 European Speed Skating Championships was held on 7 January 2022.

== Results ==
The race was started at 19:09.

Rank	Pair	Lane	Country	Time	Diff
1st place, gold medalist(s)	3	s	Netherlands; Sven Kramer; Marcel Bosker; Patrick Roest	3:37.97 TR	
2nd place, silver medalist(s)	2	s	Norway; Allan Dahl Johansson; Hallgeir Engebråten; Sverre Lunde Pedersen	3:38.92	+0.95
3rd place, bronze medalist(s)	2	c	Italy; Andrea Giovannini; Davide Ghiotto; Michele Malfatti	3:43.41	+5.44
4	3	c	Poland; Szymon Pałka; Marcin Bachanek; Artur Janicki	3:47.89	+9.92
5	1	s	Belarus; Evgeniy Bolgov; Victor Rudenko; Yahor Damaratski	3:50.21	+12.24
