= Patrick Roest =

Dutch speed skater (born 1995)

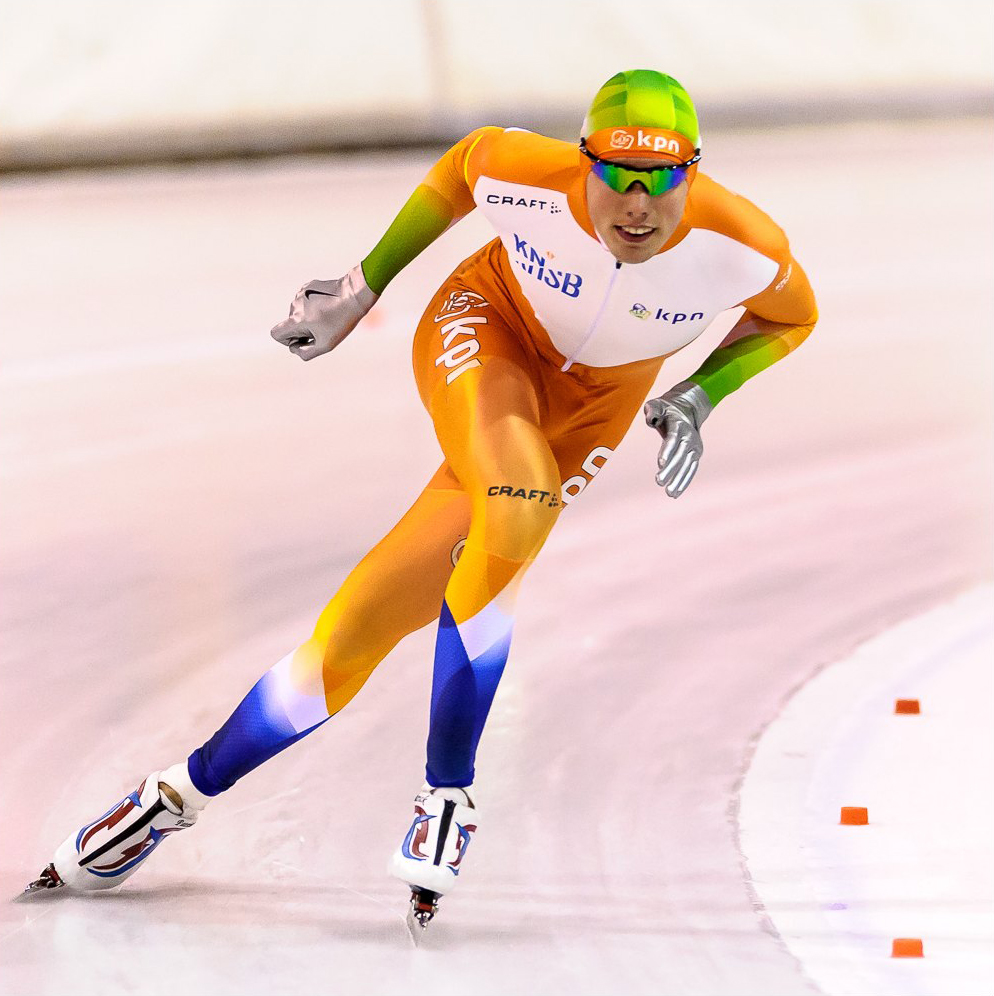
- Roest in 2013

Personal information
- Nationality: Dutch
- Born: 7 December 1995 (age 30) Lekkerkerk, Netherlands
- Height: 1.87 m (6 ft 2 in)
- Weight: 78 kg (172 lb)

Sport
- Country: Netherlands
- Sport: Speed skating
- Event(s): 1500 m, 5000 m
- Club: Team Reggeborgh
Medal record
Event	1st	2nd	3rd
Olympic Games	0	3	1
World Allround	3	3	0
World Distance	4	3	1
European Allround	2	1	0
European Distance	5	0	2
World Junior	2	0	0
Total	16	10	4
Speed skating
Representing the Netherlands
Olympic Games
Silver medal – second place	2018 Pyeongchang	1500 m
Silver medal – second place	2022 Beijing	5000 m
Silver medal – second place	2022 Beijing	10000 m
Bronze medal – third place	2018 Pyeongchang	Team pursuit
World Single Distances Championships
Gold medal – first place	2021 Heerenveen	Team pursuit
Gold medal – first place	2023 Heerenveen	5000 m
Gold medal – first place	2023 Heerenveen	Team pursuit
Gold medal – first place	2024 Calgary	5000 m
Silver medal – second place	2019 Inzell	5000 m
Silver medal – second place	2019 Inzell	10000 m
Silver medal – second place	2021 Heerenveen	5000 m
Bronze medal – third place	2021 Heerenveen	1500 m
World Allround Championships
Gold medal – first place	2018 Amsterdam	Allround
Gold medal – first place	2019 Calgary	Allround
Gold medal – first place	2020 Hamar	Allround
Silver medal – second place	2017 Hamar	Allround
Silver medal – second place	2022 Hamar	Allround
Silver medal – second place	2024 Inzell	Allround
European Championships
Gold medal – first place	2020 Heerenveen	5000 m
Gold medal – first place	2020 Heerenveen	Team pursuit
Gold medal – first place	2021 Heerenveen	Allround
Gold medal – first place	2022 Heerenveen	5000 m
Gold medal – first place	2022 Heerenveen	Team pursuit
Gold medal – first place	2023 Hamar	Allround
Gold medal – first place	2024 Heerenveen	5000 m
Silver medal – second place	2019 Collabo	Allround
Bronze medal – third place	2020 Heerenveen	1500 m
Bronze medal – third place	2024 Heerenveen	1500 m
Junior World Championships
Gold medal – first place	2014 Bjugn	Allround
Gold medal – first place	2015 Warsaw	Allround

Patrick Roest (Dutch pronunciation: [ˈpɛtrɪk ˈrust]; born 7 December 1995) is a Dutch professional long track speed skater who has won the World Allround Speed Skating Championships three times. He is placed second in the adelskalender, an all-time ranking of skaters' personal bests. He is a member of the commercial team of Team Reggeborgh.

== Career ==
In Bjugn Municipality, Norway, in 2014, Roest became World Junior Champion Allround, and he successfully defended his world title in 2015 in Warsaw, Poland.

On 12 November, he was part of the Dutch team that won the team pursuit event at the first World Cup of the 2016/17 season.

Roest was awarded the KNSB Cup for his 1500 m performance at the KNSB Cup in October 2016.

On 13 February 2018, Roest won a silver medal at the 2018 Winter Olympics for the Men's 1500 metres, behind compatriot Kjeld Nuis, with a time of 1:44.86. He also won an Olympic bronze medal in the team pursuit event.

From 3 March 2019, Roest held the world record of the allround big combination classification, having amassed 145.561 points at the World Allround 2019 Championship in Calgary. His record was later surpassed by Jordan Stolz in 2024.

Roest did not qualify for the 2026 Winter Olympics and said it was too much mental effort to continue competing. Despite the recent disappointment, Roest signed a one-year contract extension with Team Reggeborgh in May 2026.

== Records ==
=== Personal records ===
Personal records
Speed skating
Event	Result	Date	Location	Notes
500-meter	35.74	2 March 2019	Olympic Oval, Calgary	
1000 meter	1:09.04	23 February 2019	Olympic Oval, Calgary	
1500 meter	1:42.56	10 March 2019	Utah Olympic Oval, Salt Lake City	
3000 meter	3:35.26	19 December 2020	Thialf, Heerenveen	
5000 meter	6:02.98	28 January 2024	Utah Olympic Oval, Salt Lake City	NR
10000 meter	12:35.20	28 December 2020	Thialf, Heerenveen	NR

Roest is placed second in the adelskalender, with 143.948 points.

=== World records ===
Nr.	Event	Result	Date	Location	Notes
1.	Big combination	145.561	2/3 March 2019	Calgary	Former WR

== Tournament overview ==
Season	Dutch Championships Single Distances	Dutch Championships Allround	European Championships Allround	World Championships Allround	World Championships Single Distances	Olympic Games	World Cup GWC	World Championships Junior Allround	European Championships Single Distances
2013–14	HEERENVEEN (gold) 13th 1500m							BJUGN 10th 500m (gold) 3000m (silver) 1500m (silver) 5000m (gold) overall 4th team pursuit	
2014–15	HEERENVEEN 19th 1000m 19th 1500m	HEERENVEEN (gold) 7th 500m 15th 5000m 12th 1500m DNQ 10000m 13th overall						WARSAW (bronze) 500m (silver) 1000m (gold) 1500m (silver) 5000m (gold) overall (gold) team pursuit	
2015–16	HEERENVEEN 4th 1500m 11th 5000m	HEERENVEEN (gold) 4th 500m 5th 5000m (gold) 1500m 6th 10000m (bronze) overall					31st 1500m 24th 5000/10000m 87th GWC		
2016–17	HEERENVEEN (bronze) 1500m 12th 5000m 9th 10000m	HEERENVEEN (gold) (silver) 500m (bronze) 5000m (gold) 1500m 5th 10000m (silver) overall		HAMAR 4th 500m (silver) 5000m (bronze) 1500m 5th 10000m (silver) overall	GANGNEUNG 6th 1500m		(bronze) 1500m 8th 5000/10000; (gold) team pursuit 14th GWC		
2017–18	HEERENVEEN 8th 1500m 6th 5000m 11th 10000m			AMSTERDAM (gold) 500m 4th 5000m (silver) 1500m (silver) 10000m (gold) overall		GANGNEUNG (silver) 1500m (bronze) team pursuit	30th 1500m 28th 5000/10000m 91st GWC		
2018–19	HEERENVEEN (silver) 1500m (gold) 5000m (silver) 10000m		COLLALBO 4th 500m (silver) 5000m (silver) 1500m (gold) 10000m (silver) overall	CALGARY (silver) 500m (silver) 5000m (gold) 1500m (gold) 10000m (gold) overall	INZELL 7th 1500m (silver) 5000m (silver) 10000m		11th 1500m 4th 5000/10000m 4th team pursuit 22nd GWC		
2019–20	HEERENVEEN (silver) 1500m (gold) 5000m (silver) 10000m			HAMAR 7th 500m (gold) 5000m (gold) 1500m (gold) 10000m (gold) overall	SALT LAKE CITY 10th 1500m DQ 5000m 8th 10000m		4th 1500m (gold) 5000/10000; 5th team pursuit 9th GWC		HEERENVEEN (bronze) 1500m (gold) 5000m (gold) team pursuit
2020–21	HEERENVEEN (silver) 1500m (gold) 5000m (silver) 10000m	HEERENVEEN (gold) 500m (gold) 5000m (gold) 1500m (silver) 10000m (gold) overall	HEERENVEEN (silver) 500m (gold) 5000m (gold) 1500m (bronze) 10000m (gold) overall		HEERENVEEN (bronze) 1500m (silver) 5000m 7th 10000m (gold) team pursuit		(bronze) 1500m (gold) 5000/10000m		
2021–22	HEERENVEEN 4th 1500m (gold) 5000m (silver) 10000m			HAMAR 4th 500m (silver) 5000m (silver) 1500m 5th 10000m (silver) overall		BEIJING (silver) 5000m (silver) 10000m 4th team pursuit	19th 1500m 15th 5000m/10000m 4th team pursuit		HEERENVEEN (gold) 5000m (gold) team pursuit
2022–23	HEERENVEEN (gold) 1500m (gold) 5000m (gold) 10000m	HEERENVEEN (gold) 500m (gold) 5000m (gold) 1500m (gold) 10000m (gold) overall	HAMAR (gold) 500m (silver) 5000m (silver) 1500m (gold) 10000m (gold) overall		HEERENVEEN (gold) 5000m 4th 10000m (gold) team pursuit		8th 1500m (silver) 5000m/10000m (bronze) team pursuit		

Note The event distances for the Allround classification are:
- for the World Championship Junior 2014: 500, 3000, 1500 and 5000 meter
- for the World Championship Junior after 2014: 500, 1500, 1000 and 5000 meter
- for the World Championship Senior: 500, 5000, 1500 and 10000 meter

== World Cup overview ==
Season	1500 meter					
2015–16	–	–	15th(b)	14th(b)	2nd (b)	–
2016–17	4th	5th	–	3rd place, bronze medalist(s)	6th	2nd place, silver medalist(s)
2017–18	–	–	–	–	12th	–
2018–19	3rd place, bronze medalist(s)	2nd place, silver medalist(s)	–	3rd place, bronze medalist(s)	–	6th
2019–20	5th	6th	–	2nd place, silver medalist(s)	3rd place, bronze medalist(s)	
2020–21	2nd place, silver medalist(s)	3rd place, bronze medalist(s)				
2021–22	12th	15th	18th	–	–	
2022–23	7th	6th	3rd place, bronze medalist(s)	6th	3rd place, bronze medalist(s)	

Season	5000/10000 meter					
2015–16	–	–*	–	–	1st (b)	–
2016–17	7th	7th	–	– *	6th	4th
2017–18	–	–	–	–	7th	–
2018–19	1st place, gold medalist(s)	3rd place, bronze medalist(s)	–	2nd place, silver medalist(s)	–	1st place, gold medalist(s)
2019–20	1st place, gold medalist(s)	1st place, gold medalist(s)	1st place, gold medalist(s)	–	1st place, gold medalist(s)	1st place, gold medalist(s)
2020–21	1st place, gold medalist(s)	1st place, gold medalist(s)				
2021–22	3rd place, bronze medalist(s)	9th*	2nd place, silver medalist(s)	–	–	
2022–23	1st place, gold medalist(s)	1st place, gold medalist(s)	1st place, gold medalist(s)	2nd place, silver medalist(s)	2nd place, silver medalist(s)	–

Season	Team pursuit				
2015–16					
2016–17	1st place, gold medalist(s)	1st place, gold medalist(s)	–	2nd place, silver medalist(s)	–
2017–18					
2018–19	–	1st place, gold medalist(s)	–		
2019–20	1st place, gold medalist(s)	6th	–		
2020–21	–	–			
2021–22	1st place, gold medalist(s)	–	–		
2022–23	2nd place, silver medalist(s)	–	2nd place, silver medalist(s)		

– = Did not participate
(b) = Division B
DQ = Disqualified
GWC = Grand World Cup

== Medals won ==
Championship	Gold (gold)	Silver (silver)	Bronze (bronze)
Olympic Games	0	1	1
Dutch Single Distances	7	7	1
Dutch Allround	6	3	2
European Allround	4	4	1
European Single Distances	4	0	1
World Allround	9	6	1
World Single Distances	1	3	1
World Cup	17	8	9
World Junior	5	4	1
