= 2017 World Allround Speed Skating Championships =

International speed skating competition

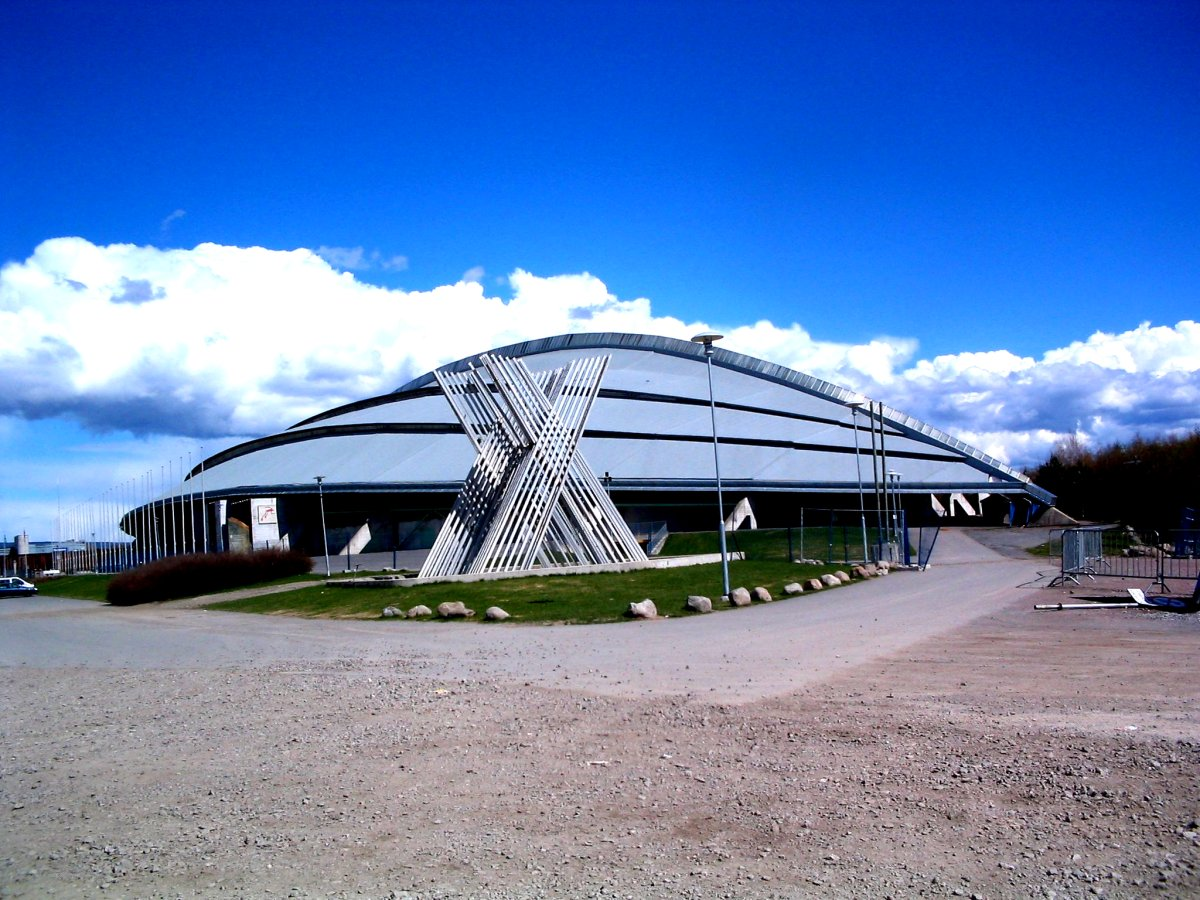
- Location: Hamar, Norway
- Venue: Vikingskipet
- Dates: 4–5 March

Medalist men
1st place, gold medalist(s)		Sven Kramer	Netherlands
2nd place, silver medalist(s)		Patrick Roest	Netherlands
3rd place, bronze medalist(s)		Jan Blokhuijsen	Netherlands

Medalist women
1st place, gold medalist(s)		Ireen Wüst	Netherlands
2nd place, silver medalist(s)		Martina Sáblíková	Czech Republic
3rd place, bronze medalist(s)		Miho Takagi	Japan

The 2017 World Allround Speed Skating Championships were held at the Vikingskipet in Hamar, Norway, from 4 to 5 March 2017.

== Schedule ==
Date	Event
4 March	Women's 500 m
4 March	Men's 500 m
4 March	Women's 3000 m
4 March	Men's 5000 m
5 March	Women's 1500 m
5 March	Men's 1500 m
5 March	Women's 5000 m
5 March	Men's 10000 m

== Medal summary ==
=== Medal table ===
Rank	Nation	Gold	Silver	Bronze	Total
1	Netherlands (NED)	2	1	1	4
2	Czech Republic (CZE)	0	1	0	1
3	Japan (JPN)	0	0	1	1
Totals (3 entries)		2	2	2	6

=== Medalists ===
Event	Gold		Silver		Bronze	
Men	Sven Kramer; Netherlands	148.425	Patrick Roest; Netherlands	149.128	Jan Blokhuijsen; Netherlands	149.698
Women	Ireen Wüst; Netherlands	160.020	Martina Sáblíková; Czech Republic	160.651	Miho Takagi; Japan	160.853
