= 2019 World Single Distances Speed Skating Championships =

- Venue: Max Aicher Arena, Inzell, Germany
- Dates: 7–10 February

The 2019 World Single Distances Speed Skating Championships was held between 7 and 10 February 2019 at the Max Aicher Arena in Inzell, Germany.

== Schedule ==
All times are local (UTC+1).

Date	Time	Events
7 February	16:00	Team sprint women
7 February	16:00	Team sprint men
7 February	16:00	3000 m women
7 February	16:00	5000 m men
8 February	16:15	500 m women
8 February	16:15	500 m men
8 February	16:15	Team pursuit women
8 February	16:15	Team pursuit men
9 February	13:15	5000 m women
9 February	13:15	1000 m men
9 February	13:15	1000 m women
9 February	13:15	10,000 m men
10 February	14:30	1500 m women
10 February	14:30	1500 m men
10 February	14:30	Mass start women
10 February	14:30	Mass start men

== Medal summary ==
=== Medal table ===
Rank	Nation	Gold	Silver	Bronze	Total
1	Netherlands	8	6	2	16
2	United States	2	0	1	3
3	Czech Republic	2	0	0	2
4	Norway	1	3	0	4
5	Japan	1	2	2	5
6	Austria	1	1	0	2
7	Russia	1	0	10	11
8	South Korea	0	2	1	3
9	Canada	0	2	0	2
Totals (9 entries)		16	16	16	48

=== Men's events ===
Event	Gold		Silver		Bronze	
500 m	Ruslan Murashov; Russia	34.22	Håvard Holmefjord Lorentzen; Norway	34.35	Viktor Mushtakov; Russia	34.43
1000 m	Kai Verbij; Netherlands	1:07.39	Thomas Krol; Netherlands	1:07.67	Kjeld Nuis; Netherlands	1:07.81
1500 m	Thomas Krol; Netherlands	1:42.58	Sverre Lunde Pedersen; Norway	1:43.16	Denis Yuskov; Russia	1:43.20
5000 m	Sverre Lunde Pedersen; Norway	6:07.16	Patrick Roest; Netherlands	6:11.70	Sven Kramer; Netherlands	6:12.53
10,000 m	Jorrit Bergsma; Netherlands	12:52.92	Patrick Roest; Netherlands	12:53.34	Danila Semerikov; Russia	12:57.40
Team pursuit	Netherlands; Marcel Bosker; Sven Kramer; Douwe de Vries	3:38.43	Norway; Håvard Bøkko; Sindre Henriksen; Sverre Lunde Pedersen	3:40.80	Russia; Aleksandr Rumyantsev; Danila Semerikov; Sergey Trofimov	3:41.31
Team sprint	Netherlands; Ronald Mulder; Kai Verbij; Kjeld Nuis	1:19.05	South Korea; Kim Jun-ho; Cha Min-kyu; Kim Tae-yun	1:20.00	Russia; Ruslan Murashov; Pavel Kulizhnikov; Viktor Mushtakov	1:20.10
Mass start	Joey Mantia; United States	7:35.66	Um Cheon-ho; South Korea	7:36.11	Chung Jae-won; South Korea	7:36.30

=== Women's events ===
Event	Gold		Silver		Bronze	
500 m	Vanessa Herzog; Austria	37.12	Nao Kodaira; Japan	37.20	Konami Soga; Japan	37.60
1000 m	Brittany Bowe; United States	1:13.41	Vanessa Herzog; Austria	1:14.38	Nao Kodaira; Japan	1:14.44
1500 m	Ireen Wüst; Netherlands	1:52.81	Miho Takagi; Japan	1:53.32	Brittany Bowe; United States	1:53.36
3000 m	Martina Sáblíková; Czech Republic	3:58.91	Antoinette de Jong; Netherlands	3:59.41	Natalya Voronina; Russia	3:59.99
5000 m	Martina Sáblíková; Czech Republic	6:44.85	Esmee Visser; Netherlands	6:46.14	Natalya Voronina; Russia	6:50.39
Team pursuit	Japan; Ayano Sato; Miho Takagi; Nana Takagi	2:55.78	Netherlands; Joy Beune; Antoinette de Jong; Ireen Wüst	2:56.20	Russia; Elizaveta Kazelina; Evgeniia Lalenkova; Natalya Voronina	2:57.72
Team sprint	Netherlands; Janine Smit; Jutta Leerdam; Letitia de Jong	1:26.28	Canada; Kaylin Irvine; Heather McLean; Kali Christ	1:27.21	Russia; Angelina Golikova; Olga Fatkulina; Daria Kachanova	1:27.26
Mass start	Irene Schouten; Netherlands	8:27.84	Ivanie Blondin; Canada	8:28.46	Elizaveta Kazelina; Russia	8:29.29
