= Adrian Wielgat =

Polish speed skater

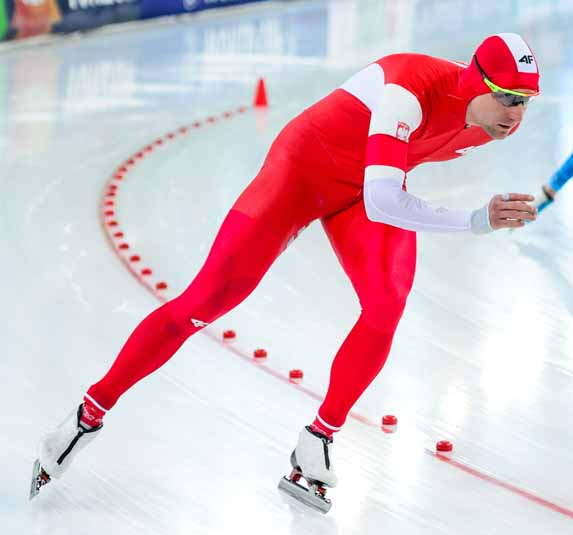
- Adrian Wielgat at Hamar 2018

Personal information
- Nationality: Polish
- Born: 10 February 1993 (age 33) Elbląg, Poland
- Height: 179 cm (5 ft 10 in)
- Weight: 79 kg (174 lb)

Sport
- Sport: Speed skating
Medal record
Men's speed skating
Representing Poland
European Championships
Bronze medal – third place	2018 Kolomna	Team pursuit

Adrian Wielgat (born 10 February 1993) is a Polish speed skater. He competed in the men's 5000 metres at the 2018 Winter Olympics.
