= Danila Semerikov =

Russian-Uzbek speed skater (born 1994)

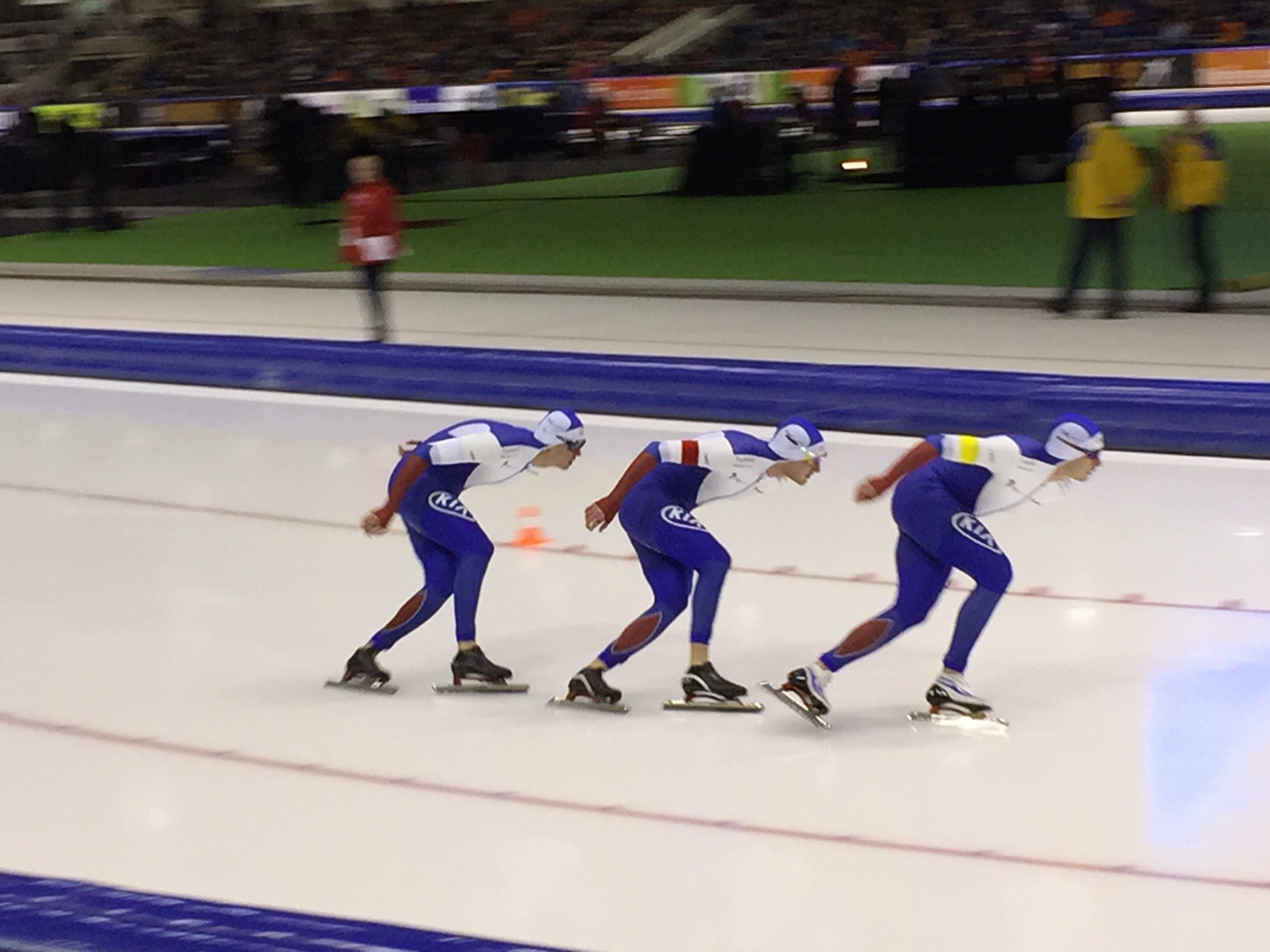
- 2015 World Single Distance Speed Skating Championships

Personal information
- Nationality: Russian
- Born: 19 October 1994 (age 31) Saratov, Russia
- Height: 1.91 m (6 ft 3 in)
- Weight: 80 kg (176 lb)

Sport
- Country: Russia; Uzbekistan
- Sport: Speed skating
- Event(s): 10,000 m, Mass start
- Club: CSKA
Medal record
Men's speed skating
Representing Russia
World Single Distances Championships
Bronze medal – third place	2019 Inzell	10,000 m
Bronze medal – third place	2019 Inzell	Team pursuit
Bronze medal – third place	2020 Salt Lake City	Team pursuit
European Championships
Silver medal – second place	2018 Kolomna	Team pursuit
Silver medal – second place	2020 Heerenveen	Team pursuit
Bronze medal – third place	2020 Heerenveen	Mass start
Representing Russian Skating Union
World Single Distances Championships
Bronze medal – third place	2021 Heerenveen	Team pursuit

Danila Mikhailovich Semerikov (Russian: Данила Михайлович Семериков; born 19 October 1994) is an Uzbek-Russian speed skater who specializes in the medium and long distances. In 2024, Semerikov switched to competing for Uzbekistan.

== Career ==
At the 2018 European Speed Skating Championships he won the silver medal in the team pursuit with compatriots Sergey Gryaztsov and Aleksandr Rumyantsev.

At the first competition weekend of the 2018–19 ISU Speed Skating World Cup he won the team pursuit event with Rumyantsev and Sergey Trofimov.

== World Cup podiums ==
Date	Season	Location	Rank	Event
16 December 2018	2018–19	Heerenveen	1st place, gold medalist(s)	5000 m
22 November 2019	2019–20	Tomaszów Mazowiecki	2nd place, silver medalist(s)	5000 m
24 November 2019	2019–20	Tomaszów Mazowiecki	3rd place, bronze medalist(s)	Team pursuit
7 December 2019	2019–20	Nur-Sultan	2nd place, silver medalist(s)	5000 m
8 December 2019	2019–20	Nur-Sultan	3rd place, bronze medalist(s)	Team pursuit
14 December 2019	2019–20	Nagano	1st place, gold medalist(s)	Team pursuit
15 December 2019	2019–20	Nagano	1st place, gold medalist(s)	5000 m
29 January 2021	2020–21	Heerenveen	3rd place, bronze medalist(s)	Team pursuit

== Personal records ==
Personal records
Speed skating
Event	Result	Date	Location	Notes
500 m	37.81	19 October 2017	Kolomna Speed Skating Center, Kolomna	
1000 m	1:16.14	8 November 2013	Ice Palace Uralskaya Molniya, Chelyabinsk	
1500 m	1:48.77	20 October 2017	Kolomna Speed Skating Center, Kolomna	
3000 m	3:42.61	3 March 2018	Inzell	
5000 m	6:08.96	16 December 2018	Thialf, Heerenveen	
10000 m	13:11.96	19 November 2017	Stavanger	
