= Alexander Rumyantsev (speed skater) =

Russian speed skater

Personal information
- Full name: Alexander Vadimovich Rumyantsev
- Nationality: Russian
- Born: 5 December 1986 (age 39) Arkhangelsk, Russian SFSR, Soviet Union (now Russia)
- Height: 1.85 m (6 ft 1 in)
- Weight: 80 kg (176 lb)

Sport
- Country: Russia
- Sport: Speed skating
- Event: 10,000 m
Medal record
Men's speed skating
Representing Russia
World Single Distances Championships
Bronze medal – third place	2019 Inzell	Team pursuit
European Championships
Silver medal – second place	2018 Kolomna	5000 m
Silver medal – second place	2018 Kolomna	Team pursuit
Silver medal – second place	2020 Heerenveen	Team pursuit
Representing Russian Skating Union
World Single Distances Championships
Bronze medal – third place	2021 Heerenveen	10,000 m

Alexander Vadimovich Rumyantsev (Russian: Александр Вадимович Румянцев; born 5 December 1986) is a Russian speed skater.

== Career ==
Rumyantsev competed at the 2010 and 2014 Winter Olympics for Russia. In 2010, he was disqualified in the 5000 metres, and was 13th in the 10000 metres. In 2014, he finished 11th in the 5000 metres. He was also a part of the Russian team pursuit squad, losing to South Korea in the quarter-finals, then losing to Norway in final C, finishing 6th.

As of September 2014, Rumyantsev's best performance at the World Single Distance Speed Skating Championships is 6th, in the 2011 team pursuit. His best individual finish is 9th, in the 2013 10000 m. His best finish at the World Allround Speed Skating Championships is 22nd, in 2009.

Rumyantsev made his World Cup debut in December 2007. As of September 2014, Rumyantsev has one World Cup victory, as part of the Russian team pursuit squad at Moscow in 2010–11 He also has an individual medal, a bronze in a 5000 m race at Heerenveen in 2013–14. His best overall finish in the World Cup is 8th, in the 5000 & 10000 m in 2013–14.

On 24 November 2017, Rumyantsevs' results from the 2014 Winter Olympics were disqualified for a doping violation.

== World Cup podiums ==
Date	Season	Location	Rank	Event
11 January 2011	2010–11	Moscow	1st place, gold medalist(s)	Team pursuit
16 March 2014	2013–14	Heerenveen	3rd place, bronze medalist(s)	5000 m
14 November 2014	2014–15	Obihiro	3rd place, bronze medalist(s)	5000 m
15 November 2014	2014–15	Obihiro	3rd place, bronze medalist(s)	Team pursuit
22 November 2014	2014–15	Seoul	3rd place, bronze medalist(s)	10,000 m
11 December 2015	2015–16	Heerenveen	3rd place, bronze medalist(s)	Team pursuit
17 March 2018	2017–18	Minsk	2nd place, silver medalist(s)	5000 m
16 November 2018	2018–19	Obihiro	1st place, gold medalist(s)	Team pursuit
18 November 2018	2018–19	Obihiro	2nd place, silver medalist(s)	5000 m
9 December 2018	2018–19	Tomaszów Mazowiecki	3rd place, bronze medalist(s)	Team pursuit
9 December 2018	2018–19	Tomaszów Mazowiecki	2nd place, silver medalist(s)	10,000 m
1 February 2019	2018–19	Hamar	2nd place, silver medalist(s)	5000 m
24 November 2019	2019–20	Tomaszów Mazowiecki	3rd place, bronze medalist(s)	Team pursuit
14 December 2019	2019–20	Nagano	1st place, gold medalist(s)	Team pursuit
15 December 2019	2019–20	Nagano	3rd place, bronze medalist(s)	5000 m

=== Overall rankings ===
Season	Event	Rank
2018–19	5000 and 10000 m	1st place, gold medalist(s)
