= Riku Tsuchiya =

Japanese speed skater (born 1997)

Personal information
- Nationality: Japanese
- Born: 14 December 1997 (age 28) Karuizawa, Japan

Sport
- Country: Japan
- Sport: Speed skating
- Event: Team pursuit
- Club: Nidec Sankyo
Medal record
World Single Distances Championships
Silver medal – second place	2020 Salt Lake City	Team pursuit
Four Continents Championships
Silver medal – second place	2025 Hachinohe	5000 m
Silver medal – second place	2025 Hachinohe	Team pursuit
Bronze medal – third place	2024 Salt Lake City	Team pursuit

Riku Tsuchiya (born 14 December 1997) is a Japanese speed skater.

He won a medal at the 2020 World Single Distances Speed Skating Championships.
