= Ryosuke Tsuchiya =

Japanese speed skater (born 1994)

Personal information
- Born: 29 November 1994 (age 31) Tsumagoi, Japan
- Height: 1.78 m (5 ft 10 in)
- Weight: 68 kg (150 lb)

Sport
- Country: Japan
- Sport: Speed skating

Ryosuke Tsuchiya (土屋 良輔, Tsuchiya Ryōsuke; born 29 November 1994) is a Japanese speed skater. He competed in the men's 5000 metres at the 2018 Winter Olympics.
