= Sergey Trofimov =

Russian speed skater (born 1995)

Personal information
- Full name: Sergey Sergeyevich Trofimov
- Nationality: Russian
- Born: 27 July 1995 (age 30) Nizhny Novgorod, Russia
- Height: 1.84 m (6 ft 0 in)
- Weight: 81 kg (179 lb)

Sport
- Country: Russia
- Sport: Speed skating
- Event: 5000 m
- Club: Nizhny Novgorod Centre of Sports Preparation
Medal record
Men's speed skating
Representing ROC
Olympic Games
Silver medal – second place	2022 Beijing	Team pursuit
Representing Russia
World Single Distances Championships
Bronze medal – third place	2019 Inzell	Team pursuit
Bronze medal – third place	2020 Salt Lake City	Team pursuit
Representing Russian Skating Union
World Single Distances Championships
Bronze medal – third place	2021 Heerenveen	5000 m
Bronze medal – third place	2021 Heerenveen	Team pursuit

Sergey Sergeyevich Trofimov (Russian: Сергей Сергеевич Трофимов; born 27 July 1995) is a Russian speed skater. He competed in the 2018 Winter Olympics.

== World Cup results ==
=== Podiums ===
Date	Season	Location	Rank	Event
11 December 2015	2015–16	Heerenveen	3rd place, bronze medalist(s)	Team pursuit
16 November 2018	2018–19	Obihiro	1st place, gold medalist(s)	Team pursuit
7 December 2018	2018–19	Tomaszów Mazowiecki	3rd place, bronze medalist(s)	Team pursuit
24 January 2021	2020–21	Heerenveen	3rd place, bronze medalist(s)	5000 m
29 January 2021	2020–21	Heerenveen	3rd place, bronze medalist(s)	Team pursuit
31 January 2021	2020–21	Heerenveen	3rd place, bronze medalist(s)	5000 m

=== Overall rankings ===
Season	Event	Rank
2020–21	5000 m	3rd place, bronze medalist(s)
