= Hallgeir Engebråten =

Norwegian speed skater (born 1999)

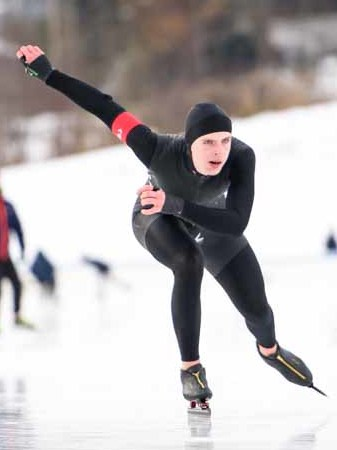
- Engebråten in 2017

Personal information
- Born: 17 December 1999 (age 26) Nord-Odal, Norway
- Height: 1.87 m (6 ft 2 in)

Sport
- Country: Norway
- Club: Nord-Odal Idrettslag
Medal record
Men's speed skating
Representing Norway
Olympic Games
| Gold medal – first place | 2022 Beijing | Team pursuit |
| Bronze medal – third place | 2022 Beijing | 5000 m |
World Allround Championships
| Bronze medal – third place | 2024 Inzell | Allround |
European Championships
| Silver medal – second place | 2022 Heerenveen | Team pursuit |
| Bronze medal – third place | 2020 Heerenveen | Team pursuit |
| Bronze medal – third place | 2022 Heerenveen | 5000 m |

Hallgeir Engebråten (born 17 December 1999) is a Norwegian speed skater who participates in national and international competitions in speed skating.

Engebråten made his international debut at the 2018 European Speed Skating Championships at the Kolomna Speed Skating Center in Kolomna, Russia. In 2021, he competed at the 2021 European Speed Skating Championships at Thialf in Heerenveen, Netherlands, where he finished in 5th place. He won the 5000 metres bronze medal at the 2022 Olympics.

== Records ==
=== Personal records ===
Personal records
Speed skating
| Event | Result | Date | Location | Notes |
| 500 meter | 36.37 | 9 March 2024 | Max Aicher Arena, Inzell | |
| 1000 meter | 1:11.08 | 16 March 2019 | Olympic Oval, Calgary | |
| 1500 meter | 1:43.71 | 21 December 2021 | Olympic Oval, Calgary | |
| 3000 meter | 3:41.25 | 24 October 2020 | Sørmarka Arena, Stavanger | |
| 5000 meter | 6:09.21 | 24 January 2021 | Thialf, Heerenveen | |
| 10000 meter | 12:55.42 | 10 March 2024 | Max Aicher Arena, Inzell | |

Engebråten occupies the 29th position on the adelskalender, with a score of 147.658 points.
