= Davide Ghiotto =

Italian speed skater (born 1993)

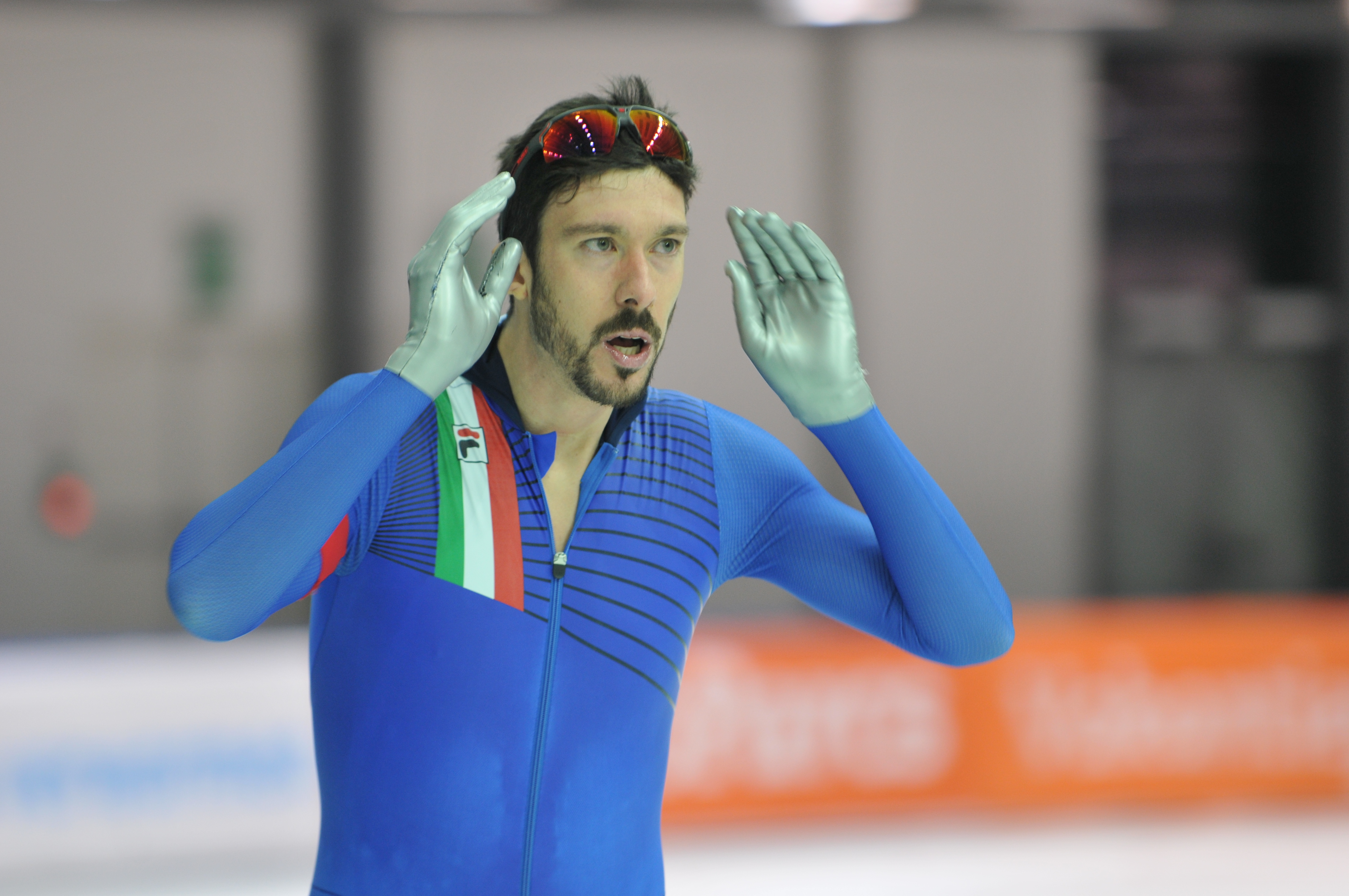
- Ghiotto at a 2022 World Cup in Stavanger, Norway

Personal information
- Nationality: Italian
- Born: 3 December 1993 (age 32) Altavilla Vicentina, Italy
- Height: 186 cm (6 ft 1 in)
- Weight: 81 kg (179 lb)

Sport
- Sport: Speed skating
Medal record
Men's speed skating
Representing Italy
Olympic Games
Gold medal – first place	2026 Milano Cortina	Team pursuit
Bronze medal – third place	2022 Beijing	10000 m
World Single Distances Championships
Gold medal – first place	2023 Heerenveen	10000 m
Gold medal – first place	2024 Calgary	Team pursuit
Gold medal – first place	2024 Calgary	10000 m
Gold medal – first place	2025 Hamar	10000 m
Silver medal – second place	2023 Heerenveen	5000 m
Silver medal – second place	2024 Calgary	5000 m
Silver medal – second place	2025 Hamar	Team pursuit
European Championships
Gold medal – first place	2026 Tomaszów Mazowiecki	Team pursuit
Silver medal – second place	2024 Heerenveen	5000 m
Silver medal – second place	2024 Heerenveen	Team pursuit
Bronze medal – third place	2022 Heerenveen	Team pursuit
Bronze medal – third place	2026 Tomaszów Mazowiecki	5000 m

Davide Ghiotto (Italian pronunciation: [ˈdavide ˈɡjotto]; born 3 December 1993) is an Italian speed skater. He is a three-time Olympian, and won a gold medal in the team pursuit at the 2026 Winter Olympics.

== Career ==
In March 2023, he became world champion in the 10000 metres at the 2023 World Single Distances Speed Skating Championships in Heerenveen.

On 25 January 2025, Ghiotto became the current world record holder in the 10000 metres.

== Personal records ==
Personal records
Speed skating
Event	Result	Date	Location	Notes
500 metres	37.52	9 March 2024	Max Aicher Arena, Inzell	
1000 metres	1:15.36	2 February 2015	Max Aicher Arena, Inzell	
1500 metres	1:45.93	10 March 2024	Max Aicher Arena, Inzell	
3000 metres	3:35.47	7 November 2025	Max Aicher Arena, Inzell	
5000 metres	6:04.23	28 January 2024	Utah Olympic Oval, Salt Lake City	NR
10000 metres	12:25.69	25 January 2025	Olympic Oval, Calgary	WR

He is currently in 21st position in the adelskalender with 146.537 points.
