= Sverre Lunde Pedersen =

Norwegian speed skater (born 1992)

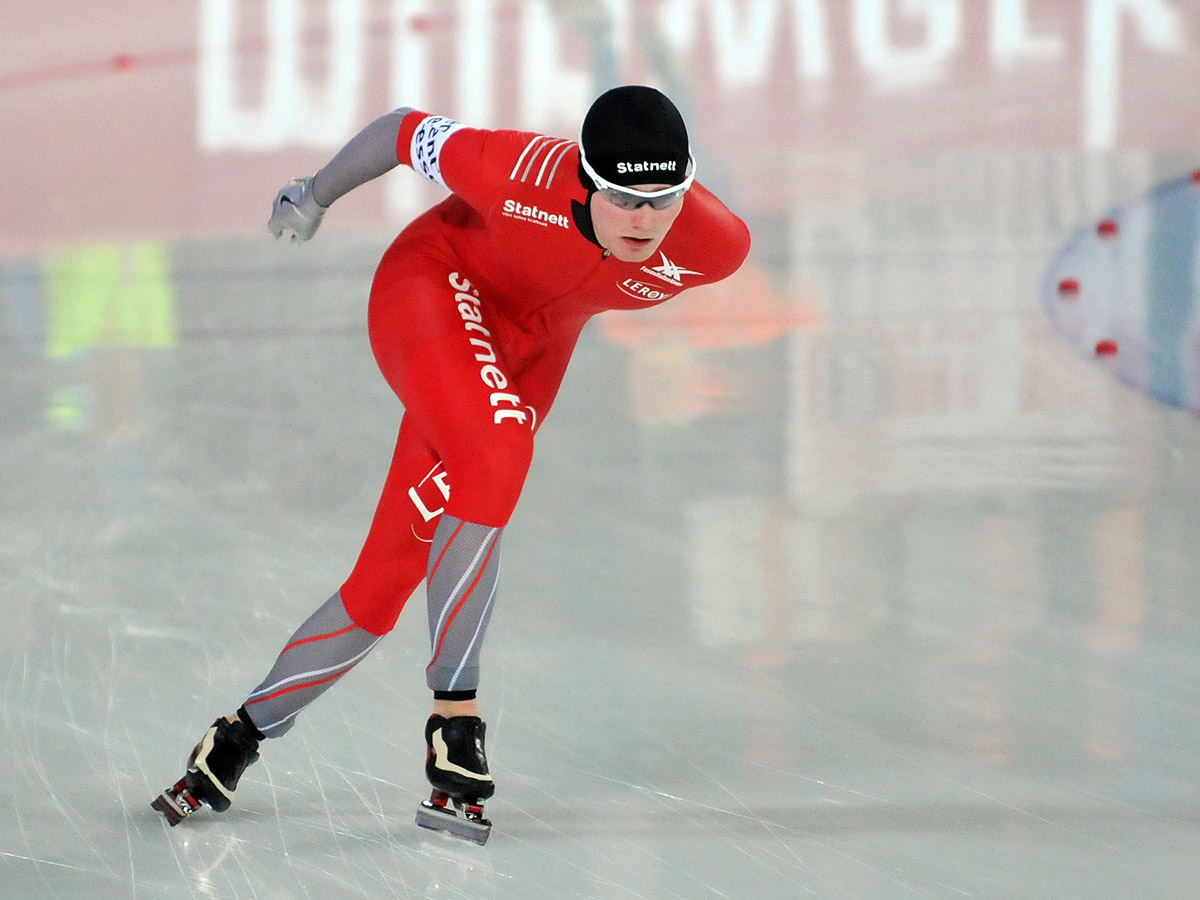
- Sverre Lunde Pedersen at the 2013 World Allround Championships in Hamar

Personal information
- Nationality: Norwegian
- Born: 17 July 1992 (age 33) Os Municipality, Norway
- Height: 1.80 m (5 ft 11 in)
- Weight: 73 kg (161 lb)

Sport
- Country: Norway
- Sport: Speed skating
- Event: 5000 m
- Club: Fana IL
- Turned pro: 2008
- Retired: 2024
Medal record
Men's speed skating
Representing Norway
Olympic Games
Gold medal – first place	2018 Pyeongchang	Team pursuit
Gold medal – first place	2022 Beijing	Team pursuit
Bronze medal – third place	2018 Pyeongchang	5000 m
World Single Distance Championships
Gold medal – first place	2019 Inzell	5000 m
Silver medal – second place	2016 Kolomna	Team pursuit
Silver medal – second place	2019 Inzell	1500 m
Silver medal – second place	2019 Inzell	Team pursuit
Silver medal – second place	2024 Calgary	Team pursuit
Bronze medal – third place	2016 Kolomna	5000 m
Bronze medal – third place	2017 Gangneung	Team pursuit
Bronze medal – third place	2023 Heerenveen	Team pursuit
World Allround Championships
Silver medal – second place	2016 Berlin	Allround
Silver medal – second place	2018 Amsterdam	Allround
Silver medal – second place	2019 Calgary	Allround
Silver medal – second place	2020 Hamar	Allround
Bronze medal – third place	2015 Calgary	Allround
European Championships
Gold medal – first place	2024 Heerenveen	Team pursuit
Silver medal – second place	2022 Heerenveen	Team pursuit
Bronze medal – third place	2019 Collabo	Allround
Bronze medal – third place	2020 Heerenveen	Team pursuit
Bronze medal – third place	2021 Heerenveen	Allround

Sverre Lunde Pedersen (Norwegian: [ˈsvæ̂rːə ˈlʉ̂ndə ˈpèːdæʂn̩]; born 17 July 1992) is a Norwegian speed skater. He is the son of former speed-skater Jarle Pedersen.

== Career ==
He is a two-time World Junior Champion and represents the club Fana Idrettslag.

In 2011 he was 6th in the European Championships in Collalbo and 14th in the World Championships in Calgary. In 2012 he finished 7th at the European Championships, with 2nd place in the 1500 m, and 8th at the World Championships.

At the 2014 Winter Olympics in Sochi he finished 5th on the 5000 m. At the 2018 Winter Olympics he partnered compatriots Håvard Bøkko, Simen Spieler Nilsen and Sindre Henriksen to win the gold medal in the men's team pursuit.

At the 2018 World Championship in Allround Skating in Amsterdam, Sverre won the silver medal after falling from a clear leadership position in the last competition, 10,000-meter. But for the fall, Sverre would have most likely been Norway's first World Champion in Allround Skating since Johann Olav Koss in 1994.

In March 2024, Pedersen retired from competitions.

== Development ==
Season	Age	500 metres	1000 metres	1500 metres	3000 metres	5000 metres	10 000 metres
2007/08	15	38.62	1.14.72	1.53.02	4.04.71	6.56.14	–
2008/09	16	37.49	1:13.47	1.50.87	3.54.32	6.44.58	14.53.91
2009/10	17	37.23	1:12.94	1.47.53	3.47.05	6.36.82	–
2010/11	18	36.59	1:13.20	1:45.48	3.52.54	6.22.83	14.16.16
2011/12	19	36.95	1:11.88	1:47.45	3:46.70	6:24.44	13:43.01
2012/13	20	36.66	1:11.45	1:46.37	3:44.98	6:17.78	13:08.82
2013/14	21	36.67	1:10.60	1:43.25	3:42.25	6:10.47	13:20.50
2014/15	22	35.87	1:10.68	1:43.99	3:37.37	6:11.77	13:09.45
2015/16	23	36.37	1:09.31	1:43.08	3:34.66	6:15.08	13:09.79
2016/17	24	36.54	1:10.33	1:46.23	3:40.20	6:15.77	13:24.57
2017/18	25	36.64	1:10.87	1:43.54	3:41.65	6:07.61	13:02.42

== Personal records ==
Personal records
Speed skating
Event	Result	Date	Location	Notes
500 metres	35.85	2 March 2019	Calgary	
1000 metres	1:09.31	14 November 2015	Calgary	
1500 metres	1:42.39	10 March 2019	Salt Lake City	
3000 metres	3:34.66	7 November 2015	Calgary	
5000 metres	6:07.16	7 February 2019	Inzell	
10000 metres	12:56.91	3 March 2019	Calgary	

He is currently in 8th position in the adelskalender with 145.541 points.
