= Michele Malfatti =

Italian speed skater (born 1994)

Personal information
- Nationality: Italian
- Born: 31 December 1994 (age 31) Trento, Italy
- Height: 1.83 m (6 ft 0 in)
- Weight: 75 kg (165 lb)

Sport
- Sport: Speed skating
Medal record
Men's speed skating
Representing Italy
Olympic Games
Gold medal – first place	2026 Milano Cortina	Team pursuit
World Championships
Gold medal – first place	2024 Calgary	Team pursuit
Silver medal – second place	2025 Hamar	Team pursuit
European Championships
Gold medal – first place	2026 Tomaszów Mazowiecki	Team pursuit
Silver medal – second place	2024 Heerenveen	Team pursuit
Bronze medal – third place	2022 Heerenveen	Team pursuit

Michele Malfatti (born 31 December 1994) is an Italian speed skater. He competed in the men's 5000 metres and the 10 000 m at the 2022 Winter Olympics.
