= 2018 KNSB Dutch Single Distance Championships – Men's 5000 m =

Dutch speed skating competition

- Venue: Thialf, Heerenveen
- Dates: 28 October 2017
- Competitors: 20 skaters

Medalist men
1st place, gold medalist(s)		Sven Kramer	NED
2nd place, silver medalist(s)		Jorrit Bergsma	NED
3rd place, bronze medalist(s)		Erik Jan Kooiman	NED

The men's 5000 meter at the 2018 KNSB Dutch Single Distance Championships took place in Heerenveen at the Thialf ice skating rink on Saturday 28 October 2017. There were 20 participants.

== Statistics ==
=== Result ===
Position	Skater	Heat	Lane	Time
1st place, gold medalist(s)	Sven Kramer	9	O	6:16.15
2nd place, silver medalist(s)	Jorrit Bergsma	8	I	6:17.16
3rd place, bronze medalist(s)	Erik-Jan Kooiman	8	O	6:19.59
4	Bob de Vries	7	O	6:20.03(4)
5	Jan Blokhuijsen	10	O	6:20.03(7)
6	Patrick Roest	9	I	6:20.72
7	Douwe de Vries	10	I	6:20.86
8	Marcel Bosker	5	O	6:22.66
9	Simon Schouten	6	O	6:23.16
10	Jos de Vos	4	I	6:23.31
11	Arjan Stroetinga	7	I	6:24.33
12	Frank Vreugdenhil	3	O	6:24.95
13	Bart Mol	2	I	6:26.56
14	Chris Huizinga	3	I	6:27.03
15	Evert Hoolwerf	1	I	6:30.67
16	Remco Schouten	2	O	6:30.97
17	Marwin Talsma	6	I	6:31.85
18	Mats Stoltenborg	5	I	6:35.03
19	Lex Dijkstra	1	O	6:36.68
20	Bart de Vries	4	O	6:45.72

Referee: Berri de Jonge. Assistant: Ingrid Heijnsbroek
Starter: Alfred van Zwam
Start: 14:05 hr. Finish: 15:43 hr.

=== Draw ===
Heat	Inside lane	Outside lane
1	Evert Hoolwerf	Lex Dijkstra
2	Bart Mol	Remco Schouten
3	Chris Huizinga	Frank Vreugdenhil
4	Jos de Vos	Bart de Vries
5	Mats Stoltenborg	Marcel Bosker
6	Marwin Talsma	Simon Schouten
7	Arjan Stroetinga	Bob de Vries
8	Jorrit Bergsma	Erik-Jan Kooiman
9	Patrick Roest	Sven Kramer
10	Douwe de Vries	Jan Blokhuijsen
