= 2019 KNSB Dutch Single Distance Championships – Men's 5000 m =

Dutch speed skating competition

- Venue: Thialf, Heerenveen
- Dates: 28 December 2018
- Competitors: 18 skaters

Medalist men
1st place, gold medalist(s)		Patrick Roest	NED
2nd place, silver medalist(s)		Jorrit Bergsma	NED
3rd place, bronze medalist(s)		Sven Kramer	NED

The men's 5000 meter at the 2019 KNSB Dutch Single Distance Championships took place in Heerenveen at the Thialf ice skating rink on Friday 28 December 2018. There were 18 participants.

== Statistics ==
=== Result ===
Position	Skater	Heat	Lane	Time
1st place, gold medalist(s)	Patrick Roest	9	O	6:09.36
2nd place, silver medalist(s)	Jorrit Bergsma	7	O	6:12.68
3rd place, bronze medalist(s)	Sven Kramer	9	I	6:13.82
4	Douwe de Vries	8	O	6:16.69
5	Marcel Bosker	7	I	6:18.56
6	Erik Jan Kooiman	5	O	6:22.01
7	Kars Jansman	6	O	6:22.99
8	Bob de Vries	4	I	6:23.27
9	Simon Schouten	6	I	6:24.26
10	Bart de Vries	2	O	6:26.64
11	Jos de Vos	8	I	6:27.53
12	Chris Huizinga	1	O	6:31.06
13	Mats Stoltenborg	4	O	6:31.35
14	Thomas Geerdinck	3	O	6:32.26
15	Remco Schouten	3	I	6:33.94
16	Lex Dijkstra	2	I	6:34.48
17	Marwin Talsma	5	I	6:36.53
18	Bart Mol	1	I	6:41.83

Referee: D. Melis. Assistant: F. Zwitser
Starter: J. Rosing
Start: 20:05 hr. Finish: 21:33 hr.

=== Draw ===
Heat	Inside lane	Outside lane
1	Bart Mol	Chris Huizinga
2	Lex Dijkstra	Bart de Vries
3	Remco Schouten	Thomas Geerdinck
4	Bob de Vries	Mats Stoltenborg
5	Marwin Talsma	Erik Jan Kooiman
6	Simon Schouten	Kars Jansman
7	Marcel Bosker	Jorrit Bergsma
8	Jos de Vos	Douwe de Vries
9	Sven Kramer	Patrick Roest
