= 2019 KNSB Dutch Single Distance Championships – Men's mass start =

Dutch speed skating competition

- Venue: Thialf, Heerenveen
- Dates: 30 December 2018
- Competitors: 25 skaters

Medalist men
1st place, gold medalist(s)		Douwe de Vries	NED
2nd place, silver medalist(s)		Victor Ramler	NED
3rd place, bronze medalist(s)		Arjan Stroetinga	NED

The men's mass start at the 2019 KNSB Dutch Single Distance Championships in Heerenveen took place at Thialf ice rink on 30 December 2018. There were 25 participants.

== Result ==
Rank	Skater	Rounds	Points					Time
Rank	Skater	Rounds	Sprint 1	Sprint 2	Sprint 3	Final sprint	Total	Time
1st place, gold medalist(s)	Douwe de Vries	16				60	60	7:31.79
2nd place, silver medalist(s)	Victor Ramler	16				40	40	7:31.86
3rd place, bronze medalist(s)	Arjan Stroetinga	16				20	20	7:31.98
4	Daan Besteman	16				10	10	7:32.35
5	Jeroen Janissen	16				6	6	7:33.68
6	Evert Hoolwerf	16	1	2	1		4	7:40.91
7	Bart Mol	16				3	3	7:35.41
8	Marwin Talsma	16			3		3	7:37.17
9	Bob de Vries	16	2				2	7:41.20
10	Harm Visser	16					0	7:36.51
11	Johan Knol	16					0	7:36.79
12	Marc Middelkoop	16					0	7:38.22
13	Marco van der Tuin	16					0	7:38.63
14	Stefan Wolffenbuttel	16					0	7:39.15
15	Daan Gelling	16					0	7:40.66
16	Teun de Wit	16					0	7:40.68
17	Jorrit Bergsma	16					0	7:53.72
18	Niels Immerzeel	16					0	7:56.19
19	Gary Hekman	16					0	8:10.21
20	Simon Schouten	16					0	8:12.39
21	Chris Huizinga	15					0	7:06.32
22	Rick Smit	14		1			0	6:57.66
23	Tjerk de Boer	8	3				0	4:01.18
24	Jordy van Workum	3					0	1:39.97
NC	Willem Hoolwerf	16		3	2		0	DQ
