= 2020 KNSB Dutch Single Distance Championships – Men's 5000 m =

Dutch speed skating competition

- Venue: Thialf, Heerenveen
- Dates: 27 December 2019
- Competitors: 16 skaters

Medalist men
1st place, gold medalist(s)		Patrick Roest	NED
2nd place, silver medalist(s)		Sven Kramer	NED
3rd place, bronze medalist(s)		Jorrit Bergsma	NED

The men's 5000 meter at the 2020 KNSB Dutch Single Distance Championships took place in Heerenveen at the Thialf ice skating rink on Friday 27 December 2019. In total, there were 16 participants.

== Statistics ==
=== Result ===
Position	Skater	Heat	Lane	Time
1st place, gold medalist(s)	Patrick Roest	8	O	6:09.79
2nd place, silver medalist(s)	Sven Kramer	6	I	6:10.91
3rd place, bronze medalist(s)	Jorrit Bergsma	7	I	6:14.65
4	Marcel Bosker	6	O	6:17.51
5	Douwe de Vries	8	I	6:18.62
6	Jan Blokhuijsen	7	O	6:21.47
7	Bart de Vries	2	I	6:22.06 PR
8	Marwin Talsma	4	O	6:22.52
9	Chris Huizinga	3	O	6:23.79
10	Kars Jansman	1	O	6:26.00
11	Erik Jan Kooiman	3	I	6:27.11
12	Victor Ramler	2	O	6:28.92
13	Jos de Vos	4	I	6:30.73
14	Crispijn Ariëns	5	I	6:32.95
15	Robert Bovenhuis	5	O	6:33.52
16	Bob de Vries	1	I	6:35.21

Referee: Hanjo Heideman. Assistant: Wil Schildwacht
Starter: Sieme Kok
Start: 19:57 hr. Finish: 21:10 hr.

=== Draw ===
Heat	Inside lane	Outside lane
1	Bob de Vries	Kars Jansman
2	Bart de Vries	Victor Ramler
3	Erik Jan Kooiman	Chris Huizinga
4	Jos de Vos	Marwin Talsma
5	Crispijn Ariëns	Robert Bovenhuis
6	Sven Kramer	Marcel Bosker
7	Jorrit Bergsma	Jan Blokhuijsen
8	Douwe de Vries	Patrick Roest
