= 2020 KNSB Dutch Single Distance Championships – Men's 10,000 m =

Dutch speed skating competition

2020 KNSB Dutch Single Distance Championships – Men's 10000 m
- Venue: Thialf, Heerenveen
- Dates: 29 December 2019
- Competitors: 10 skaters

Medalist men
1st place, gold medalist(s)		Jorrit Bergsma	NED
2nd place, silver medalist(s)		Patrick Roest	NED
3rd place, bronze medalist(s)		Marwin Talsma	NED

The men's 10,000 meter at the 2020 KNSB Dutch Single Distance Championships took place in Heerenveen at the Thialf ice skating rink on Sunday 29 December 2019. There were 10 participants.

== Statistics ==
=== Result ===
Position	Skater	Time
1st place, gold medalist(s)	Jorrit Bergsma	12:45.04
2nd place, silver medalist(s)	Patrick Roest	12:48.59
3rd place, bronze medalist(s)	Marwin Talsma	12:59.12 PR
4	Jan Blokhuijsen	13:05.00
5	Erik Jan Kooiman	13:06.69
6	Bob de Vries	13:11.32
7	Bart de Vries	13:18.88
8	Kars Jansman	13:22.25
9	Chris Huizinga	13:47.84
10	Marcel Bosker	DNF

Referee: Hanjo Heideman. Assistant: Wil Schildwacht
Starter: Sieme Kok
Start: 14:10 hr. Finish: 15:41 hr.

=== Draw ===
Heat	Inside lane	Outside lane
1	Jan Blokhuijsen	Erik Jan Kooiman
2	Marwin Talsma	Kars Jansman
3	Bob de Vries	Bart de Vries
4	Marcel Bosker	Chris Huizinga
5	Jorrit Bergsma	Patrick Roest
