= 2022 KNSB Dutch Single Distance Championships =

- Venue: Thialf, Heerenveen
- Dates: 28 October—30 October 2021

The 2022 KNSB Dutch Single Distance Championships were held at the Thialf skating rink in Heerenveen from Friday 28 October 2021 to Sunday 30 October 2021. Although the tournament was held in 2021 it was the 2022 edition as it was part of the 2021–2022 speed skating season.

== Schedule ==
Schedule
Date	Starting time	Event
Friday; 29 October 2021	16:30	Men's 500 meter(1); Women's 1500 meter Men's 500 meter(2); Men's 5000 meter
Saturday; 30 October 2021	14:10	Women's 500 meter(1); Men's 1500 meter Women's 500 meter(2); Women's 3000 meter
Sunday; 31 October 2021	12:15	Men's 10000 meter Women's 5000 meter Men's 1000 meter Women's 1000 meter Men's Mass Start; Women's Mass Start

== Medalists ==
=== Men ===
Distance	Gold		Silver		Bronze	
500m details	Kai Verbij	34.796—34.710 69.506	Dai Dai N'tab	35.164—34.927 70.091	Hein Otterspeer	34.897—35.226 70.123
1000m details	Kai Verbij	1:07.69	Hein Otterspeer	1:07.82	Thomas Krol	1:07.87
1500m details	Thomas Krol	1:44.27	Kjeld Nuis	1:44.53	Chris Huizinga	1:45.27
5000m details	Jorrit Bergsma	6:07.30	Patrick Roest	6:10.84	Marwin Talsma	6:14.31
10000m details	Jorrit Bergsma	12:39.67	Patrick Roest	12:48.05	Marwin Talsma	12:50.91
Mass start details	Bart Hoolwerf	7:34.91	Jan Blokhuijsen	7:34.96	Victor Ramler	7:35.12

=== Women ===
Distance	Gold		Silver		Bronze	
500m details	Jutta Leerdam	37.588—37.494 75.082	Femke Kok	37.751—37.629 75.380	Michelle de Jong	37.774—37.903 75.677
1000m details	Jutta Leerdam	1:13.15	Femke Kok	1:14.16	Ireen Wüst	1:14.42
1500m details	Antoinette de Jong	1:53.20	Ireen Wust	1:53.48	Jutta Leerdam	1:53.64
3000m details	Irene Schouten	3:54.59	Antoinette de Jong	4:00.83	Carlijn Achtereekte	4:02.16
5000m details	Irene Schouten	6:45.69	Sanne in 't Hof	6:57.63	Carlijn Achtereekte	7:00.50
Mass start details	Irene Schouten	8:19.57	Marijke Groenewoud	8.19.66	Evelien Vijn	8:20.68
