= 2021 KNSB Dutch Single Distance Championships – Men's 10,000 m =

Dutch speed skating competition

2021 KNSB Dutch Single Distance Championships – Men's 10000 m
- Venue: Thialf, Heerenveen
- Dates: 1 November 2020
- Competitors: 10 skaters

Medalist men
1st place, gold medalist(s)		Marwin Talsma	NED
2nd place, silver medalist(s)		Patrick Roest	NED
3rd place, bronze medalist(s)		Marcel Bosker	NED

The men's 10,000 meter at the 2021 KNSB Dutch Single Distance Championships took place in Heerenveen at the Thialf ice skating rink on Sunday 1 November 2020. There were 10 participants.

== Statistics ==
=== Result ===
Rank	Skater	Time
1st place, gold medalist(s)	Marwin Talsma	12:52.09 PR
2nd place, silver medalist(s)	Patrick Roest	12:57.67
3rd place, bronze medalist(s)	Marcel Bosker	12:59.25 PR
4	Erik Jan Kooiman	12:59.70
5	Mats Stoltenborg	13:08.53
6	Sven Kramer	13:10.09
7	Kars Jansman	13:10.60
8	Bob de Vries	13:11.15
9	Chris Huizinga	13:32.89
NC	Jorrit Bergsma	DQ
NC	Jan Blokhuijsen	DNS

=== Draw ===
Heat	Inside lane	Outside lane
1	Kars Jansman	Chris Huizinga
2	Erik Jan Kooiman	Mats Stoltenborg
3	Bob de Vries	Sven Kramer
4	Patrick Roest	Marcel Bosker
5	Marwin Talsma	Jorrit Bergsma

Referee: Berri de Jonge. Assistant: Rieks van Lubek
Starter: André de Vries
