= 2021 KNSB Dutch Single Distance Championships – Men's 5000 m =

Dutch speed skating competition

- Venue: Thialf, Heerenveen
- Dates: 30 October 2020
- Competitors: 16 skaters

Medalist men
1st place, gold medalist(s)		Patrick Roest	NED
2nd place, silver medalist(s)		Sven Kramer	NED
3rd place, bronze medalist(s)		Marcel Bosker	NED

The men's 5000 meter at the 2021 KNSB Dutch Single Distance Championships took place in Heerenveen at the Thialf ice skating rink on Friday 30 October 2020. There were 16 participants.

== Statistics ==
=== Result ===
Rank	Skater	Time
1st place, gold medalist(s)	Patrick Roest	6:10.16
2nd place, silver medalist(s)	Sven Kramer	6:15.26
3rd place, bronze medalist(s)	Marcel Bosker	6:15.46
4	Jorrit Bergsma	6:16.24
5	Marwin Talsma	6:16.66 PR
6	Jan Blokhuijsen	6:21.14
7	Kars Jansman	6:21.53
8	Erik Jan Kooiman	6:24.23
9	Bob de Vries	6:24.97
10	Mats Stoltenborg	6:25.73
11	Chris Huizinga	6:27.91
12	Beau Snellink	6:29.44
13	Crispijn Ariëns	6:31.51
14	Jos de Vos	6:33.90
15	Robert Bovenhuis	6:45.57
NC	Bart de Vries	DQ

Referee: Berri de Jonge. Assistant: Rieks van Lubek
Starter: Jan Rosing

=== Draw ===
Heat	Inside lane	Outside lane
1	Robert Bovenhuis	Beau Snellink
2	Mats Stoltenborg	Bob de Vries
3	Crispijn Ariëns	Bart de Vries
4	Jos de Vos	Marwin Talsma
5	Chris Huizinga	Erik Jan Kooiman
6	Jorrit Bergsma	Marcel Bosker
7	Kars Jansman	Jan Blokhuijsen
8	Patrick Roest	Sven Kramer
