= 2023 KNSB Dutch Single Distance Championships – Men's 5000 m =

Dutch speed skating competition

- Venue: Thialf, Heerenveen
- Dates: 3 February 2023
- Competitors: 16 skaters

Medalist men
1st place, gold medalist(s)		Patrick Roest	NED
2nd place, silver medalist(s)		Marcel Bosker	NED
3rd place, bronze medalist(s)		Jorrit Bergsma	NED

The men's 5000 meter at the 2023 KNSB Dutch Single Distance Championships took place in Heerenveen at the Thialf ice skating rink on Friday 3 February 2023. There were 16 participants. Patrick Roest, Marcel Bosker, and Jorrit Bergsma qualified for the 2023 ISU World Speed Skating Championships in Heerenveen.

== Statistics ==
=== Result ===
Rank	Skater	Time
1st place, gold medalist(s)	Patrick Roest	6:08.77
2nd place, silver medalist(s)	Marcel Bosker	6:12.95
3rd place, bronze medalist(s)	Jorrit Bergsma	6:13.37
4	Beau Snellink	6:17.85
5	Kars Jansman	6:21.35
6	Lex Dijkstra	6:23.01
7	Jordy van Workum	6:25.26
8	Chris Huizinga	6:27.09
9	Gert Wierda	6:27.60
10	Remo Slotegraaf	6:29.30
11	Marwin Talsma	6:29.39
12	Victor Ramler	6:32.21
13	Lars Woelders	6:41.51
14	Mathijs van Zwieten	6:43.00
15	Chritiaan Hoekstra	6:43.42
16	Daan Berkhout	6:51.46

Referee: Bert Timmerman. Assistant: Frank Spoel. Starter: Wim van Biezen.

=== Draw ===
Heat	Outer lane	Inner lane
1	Daan Berkhout	Mathijs van Zwieten
2	Chritiaan Hoekstra	Lars Woelders
3	Victor Ramler	Chris Huizinga
4	Lex Dijkstra	Marwin Talsma
5	Gert Wierda	Remo Slotegraaf
6	Jordy van Workum	Patrick Roest
7	Kars Jansman	Beau Snellink
8	Marcel Bosker	Jorrit Bergsma
