= 2021 KNSB Dutch Single Distance Championships =

- Venue: Thialf, Heerenveen
- Dates: 30 October-1 November 2020

The 2021 KNSB Dutch Single Distance Championships were held at the Thialf skating rink in Heerenveen from Friday 30 October 2020 to Sunday 1 November 2020. Although the tournament was held in 2020 it was the 2021 edition as it was part of the 2020–2021 speed skating season.

== Schedule ==
Schedule
Date	Starting time	Event
Friday; 30 October 2020	13:10	Men's 500 meter(1); Women's 1500 meter Men's 500 meter(2); Men's 5000 meter
Saturday; 31 October 2020	13:05	Women's 500 meter(1); Men's 1500 meter Women's 500 meter(2); Women's 3000 meter
Sunday; 1 November 2020	12:30	Men's 10000 meter Women's 5000 meter Men's 1000 meter Women's 1000 meter

== Medalists ==
=== Men ===
Distance	Gold		Silver		Bronze	
500m details	Dai Dai N'tab	34.803-34.844 69.64	Hein Otterspeer	35.022-34.866 69.880	Kai Verbij	35.134-35.247 70.370
1000m details	Thomas Krol	1:08.02	Kai Verbij	1:08.17	Kjeld Nuis	1:08.27
1500m details	Thomas Krol	1:44.30	Patrick Roest	1:45.00	Wesly Dijs	1:45.30 PR
5000m details	Patrick Roest	6:10.16	Sven Kramer	6:15.26	Marcel Bosker	6:15.46
10000m details	Marwin Talsma	12:52.09	Patrick Roest	12:57.67	Marcel Bosker	12:59.25 PR

=== Women ===
Distance	Gold		Silver		Bronze	
500m details	Femke Kok	37.882-37.880 75.762	Jutta Leerdam	38.187-38.019 76.206	Marrit Fledderus	38.391-38.280 76.671
1000m details	Jutta Leerdam	1:13.86	Femke Kok	1:15.16	Ireen Wüst	1:15.40
1500m details	Jorien ter Mors	1:55.50	Antoinette de Jong	1:55.98	Melissa Wijfje	1:56.66
3000m details	Irene Schouten	4:01.93	Reina Anema	4:04.28	Antoinette de Jong	4:04.53
5000m details	Irene Schouten	6:55.94	Reina Anema	7.01.37	Carlijn Achtereekte	7:01.62
