= 2018–19 ISU Speed Skating World Cup – World Cup 1 =

The first competition weekend of the 2018–19 ISU Speed Skating World Cup was held at the Meiji Hokkaido-Tokachi Oval in Obihiro, Japan, from Friday, 16 November, until Sunday, 18 November 2018.

== Schedule ==
The detailed event schedule:

Date	Events	Division
Friday, 16 November	500 m women (1); 500 m men (1)	B
Friday, 16 November	Mass start men semifinal 1 men Mass start men semifinal 2 men Team pursuit women Team pursuit men	
Friday, 16 November	500 m women (1); 500 m men (1)	A
Saturday, 17 November	500 m women (2); 500 m men (2); 1500 m women 1500 m men	B
Saturday, 17 November	500 m women (1); 1500 m women 1500 m men 500 m men (2)	A
Saturday, 17 November	Mass start final women Mass start final men	
Sunday, 18 November	1000 m women 1000 m men 3000 m women 5000 m men	B
Sunday, 18 November	1000 m women 1000 m men 3000 m women 5000 m men	A
Sunday, 18 November	Team sprint women Team sprint men	

== Medal summary ==
=== Men's events ===
Event	Race #	Gold	Time	Silver	Time	Bronze	Time	Report
500 m	1	(Norway) Håvard Holmefjord Lorentzen	34.732	(Russia) Pavel Kulizhnikov	34.777	(Japan) Tatsuya Shinhama	34.871	
500 m	2	(Russia) Pavel Kulizhnikov	34.619	(Japan) Ryohei Haga	34.716	(Norway) Håvard Holmefjord Lorentzen	34.771	
1000 m		(Russia) Pavel Kulizhnikov	1:07.858	(Netherlands) Kjeld Nuis	1:08.392	(Netherlands) Thomas Krol	1:08.623	
1500 m		(Russia) Denis Yuskov	1:44.550	(Netherlands) Kjeld Nuis	1:44.819	(Netherlands) Patrick Roest	1:45.124	
5000 m		(Netherlands) Patrick Roest	6:13.019	(Russia) Aleksandr Rumyantsev	6:17.677	(Netherlands) Marcel Bosker	6:18.121	
Mass start		(Italy) Andrea Giovannini	62 ^{A}	(Netherlands) Simon Schouten	40 ^{A}	(South Korea) Um Cheon-ho	20 ^{A}	
Team pursuit		Russia; Aleksandr Rumyantsev; Danila Semerikov; Sergey Trofimov	3:41.260	Netherlands; Douwe de Vries; Chris Huizinga; Marcel Bosker	3:42.140	Norway; Håvard Bøkko; Sverre Lunde Pedersen; Simen Spieler Nilsen	3:42.770	
Team sprint		Netherlands; Michel Mulder; Kai Verbij; Kjeld Nuis	1:19.780	Norway; Håvard Holmefjord Lorentzen; Johann Jørgen Sæves; Henrik Fagerli Rukke	1:20.790	Canada; Antoine Gélinas-Beaulieu; Laurent Dubreuil; Christopher Fiola	1:20.980	

^{A} In mass start, race points are accumulated during the race based on results of the intermediate sprints and the final sprint. The skater with most race points is the winner.

=== Women's events ===
Event	Race #	Gold	Time	Silver	Time	Bronze	Time	Report
500 m	1	(Japan) Nao Kodaira	37.496	(Austria) Vanessa Herzog	37.624	(Japan) Maki Tsuji	38.040	
500 m	2	(Japan) Nao Kodaira	37.298	(Austria) Vanessa Herzog	37.651	(Russia) Olga Fatkulina	37.876	
1000 m		(Austria) Vanessa Herzog	1:14.568	(Japan) Miho Takagi	1:14.824	(Japan) Nao Kodaira	1:14.842	
1500 m		(United States) Brittany Bowe	1:55.034	(Japan) Miho Takagi	1:55.127	(Russia) Yekaterina Shikhova	1:55.458	
3000 m		(Netherlands) Esmee Visser	4:04.60	(Russia) Natalia Voronina	4:05.02	(Czech Republic) Martina Sáblíková	4:05.23	
Mass start		(Japan) Nana Takagi	120 ^{A}	(Netherlands) Irene Schouten	108 ^{A}	(South Korea) Kim Bo-reum	96 ^{A}	
Team pursuit		Japan; Nana Takagi; Miho Takagi; Ayano Sato	2:57.800	Netherlands; Ireen Wüst; Lotte van Beek; Joy Beune	3:00.130	Russia; Evgeniya Lalenkova; Natalya Voronina; Elizaveta Kazelina	3:01.110	
Team sprint		Russia; Yekaterina Shikhova; Olga Fatkulina; Angelina Golikova	1:27.230	Japan; Maki Tsuji; Nao Kodaira; Konami Soga	1:27.350	Netherlands; Janine Smit; Letitia de Jong; Jutta Leerdam	1:28.810	

^{A} In mass start, race points are accumulated during the race based on results of the intermediate sprints and the final sprint. The skater with most race points is the winner.
