= Jordy van Workum =

Dutch speed skater (born 2000)

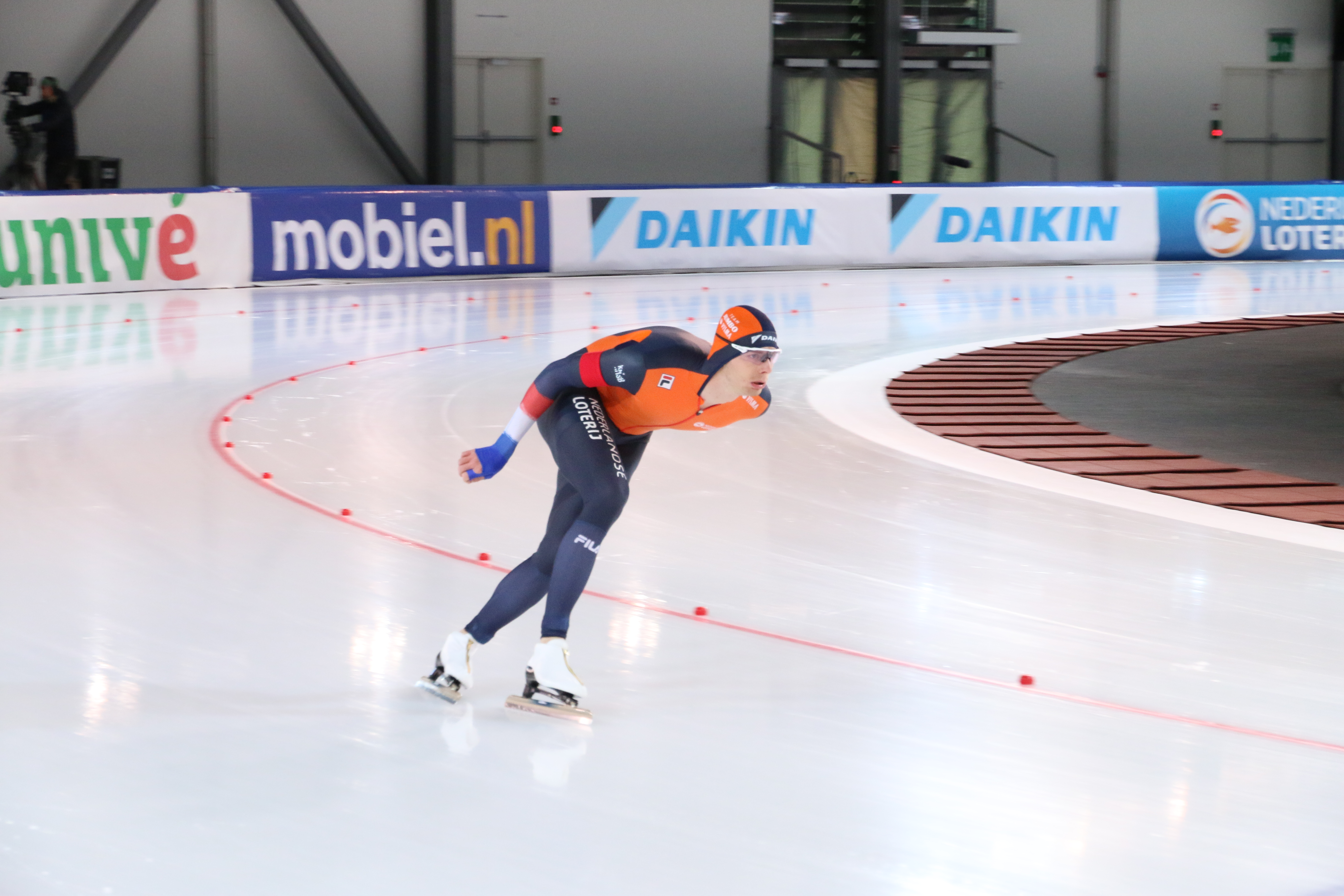
- at 2022 Worldcup Stavanger

Personal information
- Nationality: Dutch
- Born: 17 July 2000 (age 26) Hoorn, Netherlands
- Height: 1.91 m (6 ft 3 in)
- Weight: 80 kg (176 lb)

Sport
- Country: Netherlands
- Sport: Speed skating
- Event: 1500/5000 meter
- Club: Jumbo-Visma

Jordy van Workum (born 17 July 2000) is a Dutch long track speed skater. He is a member of the Jumbo-Visma team since 1 May 2020 and is coached by nl:Sicco Janmaat.

== Personal records ==
Personal records
Speed skating
Event	Result	Date	Location	Notes
500 meter	36.91	27 December 2022	Heerenveen	
1000 meter	1:11.32	15 January 2021	Heerenveen	
1500 meter	1:45.37	28 December 2022	Heerenveen	
3000 meter	3:42.89	22 December 2022	Heerenveen	
5000 meter	6:20.62	27 December 2022	Heerenveen	
10000 meter	13:25.20	28 December 2022	Heerenveen	

(updated 28 December 2022)

== Tournament overview ==
Season	Dutch Championships Single Distances	Dutch Championships Allround	World Cup GWC	World Championships Junior
2018–19	HEERENVEEN 25th mass start			BASELGA di PINÈ 41st 500m 16th 1500m 16th 1000m 5th 5000m 7th overall 10th mass start
2019–20	HEERENVEEN 17th 1500m 13th mass start			
2020–21		HEERENVEEN 7th 500m 16th 5000m 7th 1500m DNQ 10000m NC(12) overall		
2021–22	HEERENVEEN 13th 1500m 14th 5000m 11th 10000m	HEERENVEEN 4th 500m 9th 5000m (bronze) 1500m DQ 10000m NC overall		
2022–23	HEERENVEEN 15th 1500m 7th 5000m 13th mass start	HEERENVEEN (bronze) 500m 5th 5000m (silver) 1500m 7th 10000m 5th overall	39th 1500m 35th 5000m	

- NC = No classification
- DQ = Disqualified
- DNQ = Did not qualify for the final distance
