= 2023 KNSB Dutch Allround Championships =

Sport season from Dutch

- Venue: Thialf ice skating rink, Heerenveen
- Dates: 27–28 December 2022
- Competitors: 20 men 20 women

Medalist men
1st place, gold medalist(s)		Patrick Roest	NED
2nd place, silver medalist(s)		Beau Snellink	NED
3rd place, bronze medalist(s)		Marcel Bosker	NED

Medalist women
1st place, gold medalist(s)		Antoinette Rijpma-de Jong	NED
2nd place, silver medalist(s)		Marijke Groenewoud	NED
3rd place, bronze medalist(s)		Joy Beune	NED

The 2023 KNSB Dutch Allround Championships in speed skating were held in Heerenveen at the Thialf ice skating rink from Tuesday 27 December to Wednesday 28 December 2022. The tournament was part of the 2022–2023 speed skating season. Patrick Roest and Antoinette Rijpma-de Jong won the allround titles. Patrick Roest won all four distances. Only the top 8 athletes after the 1500 meters were eligible to skate the final distance. The allround championships were held in conjunction with the 2023 KNSB Dutch Sprint Championships.

== Schedule ==
Tuesday, 27 December	Wednesday 28 December
500 meter women allround 500 meter men allround 3000 meter women allround 5000 meter men allround	1500 meter women allround 1500 meter men allround 5000 meter women allround 10,000 meter men allround

== Medalists ==
Event	Gold		Silver		Bronze	
Men's allround	Patrick Roest	146.060	Beau Snellink	149.143	Marcel Bosker	149.787
Women's allround	Antoinette Rijpma-de Jong	157.859	Marijke Groenewoud	158.721	Joy Beune	160.594

== Men's allround classification ==
Rank	Athlete	Team	500m	5000m	1500m	10.000m	Total points Samalog
1st place, gold medalist(s)	Patrick Roest	Team Reggeborgh	36.11 (1)	6:10.41 (1)	1:44.05 (1)	12:44.52 (1)	146.060
2nd place, silver medalist(s)	Beau Snellink	Team Jumbo-Visma	37.67 (13)	6:11.08 (2)	1:47.22 (7)	12:52.51 (2)	149.143
3rd place, bronze medalist(s)	Marcel Bosker	Team Reggeborgh	37.04 (5)	6:17.88 (4)	1:45.97 (3)	13:12.72 (4)	149.787
4	Kars Jansman	Team Jumbo-Visma	37.83 (15)	6:16.06 (3)	1:47.31 (8)	13:01.63 (3)	150.287
5	Jordy van Workum	Team Jumbo-Visma	36.91 (3)	6:20.62 (5)	1:45.37 (2)	13:25.20 (7)	150.355
6	Chris Huizinga	Team Jumbo-Visma	37.00 (4)	6:23.43 (6)	1:47.02 (5)	13:19.57 (6)	150.994
7	Remo Slotegraaf	Team Jumbo-Visma	37.10 (7)	6:24.80 (8)	1:47.15 (6)	13:27.59 (8)	151.675
8	Marwin Talsma	Team Albert Heijn Zaanlander	38.48 (18)	6:23.52 (7)	1:48.98 (14)	13:19.23 (5)	153.119
9	Tjerk de Boer	Team Albert Heijn Zaanlander	36.19 (2)	6:34.75 (15)	1:47.34 (9)		111.445
10	Lex Dijkstra	Team Reggeborgh	37.49 (11)	6:25.27 (9)	1:46.74 (4)		111.597
11	Jesse Speijers	Team IKO	37.14 (8)	6:27.11 (10)	1:47.90 (10)		111.817
12	Victor Ramler	Team Reggeborgh	37.46 (10)	6:28.15 (11)	1:49.21 (15)		112.678
13	Sijmen Egberts		37.31 (9)	6:34.98 (16)	1:48.81 (13)		113.078
14	Yves Vergeer	Team IKO	37.57 (12)	6:35.06 (17)	1:48.45 (11)		113.226
15	Gert Wierda	Team Albert Heijn Zaanlander	37.91 (16)	6:33.04 (12)	1:48.59 (12)		113.410
16	Jur Veenje	Gewest Friesland	37.06 (6)	6:44.91 (20)	1:49.84 (16)		114.164
17	Jasper Krommenhoek		38.48 (17)	6:33.06 (13)	1:50.23 (17)		114.529
18	Homme Jan de Groot		38.55 (19)	6:34.37 (14)	1:51.51 (18)		115.157
19	Mathijs van Zwieten		37.82 (14)	6:40.50 (18)	1:52.51 (20)		115.373
20	Lars Woelders		38.65 (20)	6:43.59 (19)	1:52.31 (19)		116.445

== Women's allround classification ==
Rank	Athlete	Team	500m	3000m	1500m	5000m	Total points Samalog
1st place, gold medalist(s)	Antoinette Rijpma-de Jong	Team Jumbo-Visma	38.39 (1)	4:00.68 (2)	1:52.95 (1)	6:57.06 (3)	157.859
2nd place, silver medalist(s)	Marijke Groenewoud	Team Albert Heijn Zaanlander	38.95 (2)	3:59.40 (1)	1:54.89 (2)	6:55.75 (2)	158.721
3rd place, bronze medalist(s)	Joy Beune	Team IKO	39.53 (6)	4:00.85 (3)	1:55.68 (3)	7:03.63 (6)	160.594
4	Robin Groot	Team IKO	39.30 (4)	4:04.38 (4)	1:57.31 (6)	7:04.41 (7)	161.574
5	Esther Kiel	Team BDM-BTZ	39.74 (7)	4:06.44 (7)	1:57.69 (7)	7:03.52 (5)	162.395
6	Merel Conijn	Team Jumbo-Visma	40.05 (9)	4:05.98 (6)	1:57.20 (5)	7:03.01 (4)	162.413
7	Reina Anema	Team Jumbo-Visma	40.20 (10)	4:07.58 (9)	1:57.07 (4)	7:06.12 (8)	163.098
8	Sanne in 't Hof	Gewest Friesland	42.33 (19)	4:04.86 (5)	1:59.50 (12)	6:53.23 (1)	164.296
9	Myrthe de Boer	Team Jumbo-Visma	39.38 (5)	4:12.53 (13)	1:58.74 (11)		121.048
10	Jade Groenewoud	TalentNED	40.49 (13)	4:07.73 (10)	1:58.33 (8)		121.221
11	Aveline Hijlkema	Team FrySk	40.35 (11)	4:09.42 (11)	1:59.51 (13)		121.756
12	Paulien Verhaar	Team FrySk	40.36 (12)	4:11.76 (12)	1:58.69 (10)		121.883
13	Melissa Wijfje	Team Albert Heijn Zaanlander	39.98 (8)	4:14.83 (15)	1:58.53 (9)		121.961
14	Bente Kerkhoff	KNSB Talent Team Noordwest	40.77 (14)	4:14.70 (14)	2:01.85 (14)		123.836
15	Evelien Vijn	Team Jumbo-Visma	41.67 (17)	4:15.34 (16)	2:02.91 (16)		125.196
16	Sophie Kraaijeveld		42.24 (18)	4:16.60 (17)	2:02.43 (15)		125.816
17	Eline van Voorden	Fortune Coffee	41.55 (16)	4:21.68 (19)	2:03.02 (17)		126.169
18	Sterre Jonkers	Gewest Friesland	42.47 (20)	4:20.85 (18)	2:05.51 (18)		127.781
19	Lisan van der Linde		41.45 (15)	4:31.48 (20)	2:05.64 (19)		128.576
20	Elisa Dul	Team Albert Heijn Zaanlander	39.15 (3)	4:07.26 (8)	DNS		80.360

- DNS = Did not start
