= 2019 KNSB Dutch Single Distance Championships – Men's 10,000 m =

Dutch speed skating competition

2019 KNSB Dutch Single Distance Championships – Men's 10000 m
- Venue: Thialf, Heerenveen
- Dates: 30 December 2018
- Competitors: 10 skaters

Medalist men
1st place, gold medalist(s)		Jorrit Bergsma	NED
2nd place, silver medalist(s)		Patrick Roest	NED
3rd place, bronze medalist(s)		Douwe de Vries	NED

The men's 10,000 meter at the 2019 KNSB Dutch Single Distance Championships took place in Heerenveen at the Thialf ice skating rink on Sunday 30 December 2018. There were 10 participants.

== Statistics ==
=== Result ===
Position	Skater	Time
1st place, gold medalist(s)	Jorrit Bergsma	12:43.70
2nd place, silver medalist(s)	Patrick Roest	12:50.86
3rd place, bronze medalist(s)	Douwe de Vries	12:56.61 PR
4	Bob de Vries	13:06.21
5	Jouke Hoogeveen	13:06.30
6	Mats Stoltenborg	13:07.88
7	Kars Jansma	13:16.01
8	Jos de Vos	13:26.01
9	Chris Huizinga	13:29.09 PR
10	Bart de Vries	13:30.03

=== Draw ===
Heat	Inside lane	Outside lane
1	Jos de Vos	Mats Stoltenborg
2	Bart de Vries	Chris Huizinga
3	Jouke Hoogeveen	Bob de Vries
4	Patrick Roest	Jorrit Bergsma
5	Kars Jansma	Douwe de Vries

Referee: D. Melis. Assistant: F. Zwitser
Starter: J. Rosing
Start: 20:05 hr. Finish: 21:33 hr.
