= 2023 KNSB Dutch Single Distance Championships – Men's 10,000 m =

Dutch speed skating competition

2023 KNSB Dutch Single Distance Championships – Men's 10000 m
- Venue: Thialf, Heerenveen
- Dates: 5 February 2023
- Competitors: 10 skaters

Medalist men
1st place, gold medalist(s)		Patrick Roest	NED
2nd place, silver medalist(s)		Jorrit Bergsma	NED
3rd place, bronze medalist(s)		Kars Jansman	NED

The men's 10,000 meter at the 2023 KNSB Dutch Single Distance Championships took place in Heerenveen at the Thialf ice skating rink on Sunday 5 February 2023. There were 10 participants. Patrick Roest and Jorrit Bergsma qualified for the 2023 ISU World Speed Skating Championships in Heerenveen.

== Statistics ==
=== Result ===
Rank	Skater	Time
1st place, gold medalist(s)	Patrick Roest	12:47.22
2nd place, silver medalist(s)	Jorrit Bergsma	12:50.88
3rd place, bronze medalist(s)	Kars Jansman	13:05.79
4	Beau Snellink	13:05.78
5	Mats Stoltenberg	13:14.73
6	Marwin Talsma	13:16.38
7	Gert Wierda	13:30.02
8	Chris Huizinga	13:31.02
9	Lex Dijkstra	13:31.45
10	Remo Slotegraaf	13:38.53

=== Draw ===
Heat	Inner lane	Outer lane
1	Lex Dijkstra	Remo Slotegraaf
2	Chris Huizinga	Gert Wierda
3	Mats Stoltenberg	Marwin Talsma
4	Kars Jansman	Beau Snellink
5	Patrick Roest	Jorrit Bergsma

Referee: Bert Timmerman. Assistant: Frank Spoel. Starter: Wim van Biezen.
