= 2021 KNSB Dutch Allround Championships =

Sport season from dutch

- Venue: Thialf ice skating rink, Heerenveen
- Dates: 21–22 November 2020
- Competitors: 20 men 20 women

Medalist men
1st place, gold medalist(s)		Patrick Roest	NED
2nd place, silver medalist(s)		Marcel Bosker	NED
3rd place, bronze medalist(s)		Marwin Talsma	NED

Medalist women
1st place, gold medalist(s)		Antoinette de Jong	NED
2nd place, silver medalist(s)		Melissa Wijfje	NED
3rd place, bronze medalist(s)		Reina Anema	NED

The 2021 KNSB Dutch Allround Championships in speed skating were held in Heerenveen at the Thialf ice skating rink from 21 to 22 November 2021. The tournament was part of the 2020–2021 speed skating season. Patrick Roest and Antoinette de Jong won the allround titles. The allround championships were held a week before the Dutch Sprint Championships.

The titleholders were Jan Blokhuijsen and Antoinette de Jong

== Schedule ==
Saturday, 21 November	Sunday, 22 November
500 meter women allround 500 meter men allround 3000 meter women allround 5000 meter men allround	1500 meter women allround 1500 meter men allround 5000 meter women allround 10,000 meter men allround

== Medalists ==
=== Allround ===
Event	Gold		Silver		Bronze	
Men's allround	Patrick Roest	148.304	Marcel Bosker	149.595	Marwin Talsma	150.851
Women's allround	Antoinette de Jong	161.081	Melissa Wijfje	161.917	Reina Anema	163.421

=== Distance podia ===
Event	Winner	Runner-up	Third place
Men's 500 m	Patrick Roest	Tjerk de Boer	Koen Verweij
Men's 1500 m	Patrick Roest	Marcel Bosker	Koen Verweij
Men's 5000 m	Patrick Roest	Marwin Talsma	Marcel Bosker
Men's 10000 m	Marwin Talsma	Patrick Roest	Marcel Bosker
Women's 500 m	Jorien ter Mors	Antoinette de Jong	Marijke Groenewoud
Women's 1500 m	Antoinette de Jong	Jorien ter Mors	Melissa Wijfje
Women's 3000 m	Melissa Wijfje	Antoinette de Jong	Reina Anema
Women's 5000 m	Reina Anema	Esmee Visser	Antoinette de Jong

== Classification ==
=== Men's allround ===
Rank	Skater	500m	5000m	1500m	10,000m	Total points Samalog
1st place, gold medalist(s)	Patrick Roest	36.47 (1)	6:15.31 (1)	1:45.68 (1)	13:01.54 (2)	148.304
2nd place, silver medalist(s)	Marcel Bosker	37.02 (5)	6:17.41 (3)	1:46.47 (2)	13:06.88 (3)	149.595
3rd place, bronze medalist(s)	Marwin Talsma	38.00 (13) PR	6:16.04 (2) PR	1:48.53 (5)	13:01.43 (1)	150.851 PR
4	Chris Huizinga	37.49 (9)	6:23.02 (6)	1:48.41 (4)	13:20.31 (4) PR	151.943
5	Koen Verweij	36.59 (3)	6:29.41 (12)	1:47.39 (3)	13:38.68 (7)	152.261
6	Beau Snellink	38.03 (14)	6:20.12 (4) PR	1:49.97 (10) PR	13:24.25 (5) PR	152.910 PR
7	Remo Slotegraaf	37.38 (8) PR	6:27.97 (10) PR	1:48.67 (6) PR	13:52.80 (8) PR	154.040 PR
8	Bart de Vries	39.67 (19) PR	6:24.04 (7)	1:50.93 (14) PR	13:26.00 (6)	155.350 PR
NC9	Yves Vergeer	37.03 (6) PR	6:34.43 (14) PR	1:48.99 (8) PR		112.803
NC10	Kars Jansman	37.67 (12) PR	6:28.71 (11)	1:49.44 (9)		113.021
NC11	Victor Ramler	37.61 (11)	6:26.64 (8)	1:50.35 (13)		113.057
NC12	Jordy van Workum	37.28 (7) PR	6:35.85 (16) PR	1:48.69 (7) PR		113.095
NC13	Tjerk de Boer	36.56 (2)	6:43.17 (19)	1:50.19 (11)		113.607
NC14	Jos de Vos	38.10 (15)	6:36.25 (18)	1:50.28 (12)		114.485
NC15	Crispijn Ariëns	38.77 (16)	6:30.22 (13)	1:51.28 (15)		114.885
NC16	Jesse Speijers	37.50 (10)	6:43.66 (20)	1:51.33 (16)		114.976
NC17	Bob de Vries	39.56 (18) PR	6:27.25 (9)	1:52.40 (17)		115.751
NC18	Ids Bouma	39.00 (17) PR	6:35.26 (15) PR	1:53.05 (19)		116.209
NC19	Jeroen Janissen	52.09 (20) *	6:36.07 (17)	1:52.51 (18)		129.200
DQ	Jan Blokhuijsen	36.96 (4)	6:21.89 (5)			75.149

- * = Fall

=== Women's allround ===
Rank	Skater	500m	3000m	1500m	5000m	Total points Samalog
1st place, gold medalist(s)	Antoinette de Jong	39.19 (2)	4:04.19 (2)	1:55.61 (1)	7:06.57 (3)	161.081
2nd place, silver medalist(s)	Melissa Wijfje	39.65 (5)	4:03.10 (1)	1:56.30 (3)	7:09.85 (4)	161.917
3rd place, bronze medalist(s)	Reina Anema	41.15 (15)	4:04.64 (3)	1:57.49 (4)	7:03.35 (1)	163.421
4	Esther Kiel	39.75 (6) PR	4:08.36 (6)	1:59.06 (9)	7:15.89 (5)	164.418 PR
5	Joy Beune	40.08 (8)	4:08.45 (7)	1:58.95 (7)	7:17.12 (6)	164.850
6	Aveline Hijlkema	39.78 (7) PR	4:10.61 (8)	1:58.51 (6) PR	7:23.04 (7)	165.355 PR
7	Gioya Lancee	39.53 (4) PR	4:12.69 (12) PR	1:58.42 (5) PR	7:32.50 (8) PR	166.368 PR
8	Esmee Visser	42.24 (20)	4:07.10 (4)	2:01.82 (16)	7:04.95 (2)	166.524
NC9	Jorien ter Mors	38.32 (1)	4:07.65 (5)	1:55.63 (2)		118.138
NC10	Marijke Groenewoud	39.29 (3)	4:11.58 (9) PR	2:00.32 (13)		121.326
NC11	Merel Conijn	40.18 (9)	4:14.97 (17)	1:58.98 (8) PR		122.335
NC12	Paulien Verhaar	40.18 (9) PR	4:13.95 (15)	1:59.73 (11) PR		122.415
NC13	Roza Blokker	40.77 (14)	4:12.34 (10)	1:59.14 (10)		122.539
NC14	Robin Groot	40.47 (12)	4:16.51 (18)	2:00.31 (12)		123.324
NC15	Evelien Vijn	40.63 (13) PR	4:13.41 (13)	2:01.91 (17) PR		123.501
NC16	Sanne in 't Hof	41.31 (16)	4:12.55 (11)	2:01.45 (14)		123.884
NC17	Ineke Dedden	41.46 (17)	4:14.72 (16)	2:02.50 (19)		124.746
NC18	Sterre Jonkers	42.18 (19)	4:13.67 (14)	2:02.49 (18)		125.288
NC19	Myrthe de Boer	40.35 (11)	4:29.84 (19)	2:01.59 (15)		125.853
NC20	Muriël Meijer	41.93 (18)	4:35.63 (20)	2:08.30 (20)		130.634
