= 2019 KNSB Dutch Single Distance Championships – Men's 1500 m =

- Venue: Thialf, Heerenveen
- Dates: 29 December 2018
- Competitors: 20 skaters

Medalist men
1st place, gold medalist(s)		Kjeld Nuis	NED
2nd place, silver medalist(s)		Patrick Roest	NED
3rd place, bronze medalist(s)		Thomas Krol	NED

The men's 1500 meter at the 2019 KNSB Dutch Single Distance Championships in Heerenveen took place at the Thialf ice skating rink on Saturday 29 December 2018. There were 20 participants.

== Statistics ==
=== Result ===
Position	Skater	Heat	Lane	Time
1st place, gold medalist(s)	Kjeld Nuis	9	I	1:44.02
2nd place, silver medalist(s)	Patrick Roest	9	O	1:44.20
3rd place, bronze medalist(s)	Thomas Krol	10	O	1:44.74
4	Sven Kramer	8	I	1:45.35
5	Douwe de Vries	8	O	1:46.05
6	Wesly Dijs	6	O	1:46.35 PR
7	Marcel Bosker	10	I	1:47.26
8	Gijs Esders	7	O	1:47.48 PR
9	Chris Huizinga	6	I	1:48.06
10	Louis Hollaar	7	I	1:48.20
11	Tijmen Snel	3	I	1:48.37 PR
12	Pim Schipper	5	I	1:48.52
13	Jos de Vos	5	O	1:49.01
14	Martijn van Oosten	3	O	1:49.19
15	Tjerk de Boer	4	O	1:49.91
16	Simon Schouten	4	I	1:49.93
17	Jorick Duijzer	1	I	1:50.44
18	Teun de Wit	1	O	1:50.81
19	Thomas Geerdinck	2	I	1:51.18
20	Jan Hamers	2	O	1:52.03

Referee: D. Melis
Starter: J. Rosing
Start: 14:31 hr. Finish: 16:03 hr.

=== Draw ===
Heat	Inner lane	Outer lane
1	Jorick Duijzer	Teun de Wit
2	Thomas Geerdinck	Jan Hamers
3	Tijmen Snel	Martijn van Oosten
4	Simon Schouten	Tjerk de Boer
5	Pim Schipper	Jos de Vos
6	Chris Huizinga	Wesly Dijs
7	Louis Hollaar	Gijs Esders
8	Sven Kramer	Douwe de Vries
9	Kjeld Nuis	Patrick Roest
10	Marcel Bosker	Thomas Krol
