= 2025 World Single Distances Speed Skating Championships – Men's 5000 metres =

Men's 5000 metres at the 2025 World Single Distances Speed Skating Championships
- Venue: Vikingskipet
- Location: Hamar, Norway
- Dates: 13 March
- Competitors: 20 from 11 nations
- Winning time: 6:10.05

Medalists
gold medal	Sander Eitrem	Norway
silver medal	Beau Snellink	Netherlands
bronze medal	Vladimir Semirunniy	Poland

The Men's 5000 metres competition at the 2025 World Single Distances Speed Skating Championships took place on 13 March 2025.

== Qualification ==
A total of 20 entry quotas were available for the event, with a maximum of three per country. The entry quotas were assigned to countries following a Special Qualification Ranking List based on rankings and performances of skaters during the 2024–25 ISU Speed Skating World Cup.

== Records ==
Prior to this competition, the existing world and track records were as follows.

	Time	Athlete	Date
World Record	6:01.56	Nils van der Poel (SWE)	3 December 2021
Track Record	6:09.75	Sven Kramer (NED)	7 February 2009

== Results ==
The race was started at 19:11.

Rank	Pair	Lane	Name	Country	Time	Diff
1st place, gold medalist(s)	9	o	Sander Eitrem	Norway	6:10.05	
2nd place, silver medalist(s)	9	i	Beau Snellink	Netherlands	6:11.72	+1.67
3rd place, bronze medalist(s)	3	i	Vladimir Semirunniy	Poland	6:12.95	+2.90
4	10	o	Davide Ghiotto	Italy	6:13.55	+3.50
5	8	i	Metoděj Jílek	Czech Republic	6:15.15	+5.10
6	3	o	Riccardo Lorello	Italy	6:15.71	+5.66
7	8	o	Ted-Jan Bloemen	Canada	6:16.27	+6.22
8	5	o	Chris Huizinga	Netherlands	6:16.75	+6.70
9	7	i	Timothy Loubineaud	France	6:18.23	+8.18
10	10	i	Casey Dawson	United States	6:21.20	+11.15
11	6	o	Michele Malfatti	Italy	6:22.99	+12.94
12	1	i	Jorrit Bergsma	Netherlands	6:23.41	+13.36
13	7	o	Graeme Fish	Canada	6:23.73	+13.68
14	6	i	Bart Swings	Belgium	6:25.43	+15.38
15	4	i	Fridtjof Petzold	Germany	6:26.39	+16.34
16	2	i	Patrick Beckert	Germany	6:26.81	+16.76
17	5	i	Felix Maly	Germany	6:29.42	+19.37
18	4	o	Wu Yu	China	6:29.63	+19.58
19	2	o	Sigurd Henriksen	Norway	6:30.72	+20.67
20	1	o	Filip Møller Nordal	Norway	6:47.28	+37.23
