= 2022 KNSB Dutch Allround Championships =

Sport season from dutch

- Venue: Thialf ice skating rink, Heerenveen
- Dates: 22–23 January 2022
- Competitors: 20 men 20 women

Medalist men
1st place, gold medalist(s)		Marcel Bosker	NED
2nd place, silver medalist(s)		Beau Snellink	NED
3rd place, bronze medalist(s)		Marwin Talsma	NED

Medalist women
1st place, gold medalist(s)		Merel Conijn	NED
2nd place, silver medalist(s)		Joy Beune	NED
3rd place, bronze medalist(s)		Melissa Wijfje	NED

The 2022 KNSB Dutch Allround Championships in speed skating were held in Heerenveen at the Thialf ice skating rink from 22 to 23 January 2022. The tournament was part of the 2021–2022 speed skating season. Marcel Bosker and Merel Conijn won the allround titles. The allround championships were held at the same time as the 2022 KNSB Sprint Allround Championships.

== Schedule ==
Saturday, 22 January	Sunday, 23 January
500 meter women allround 500 meter men allround 3000 meter women allround 5000 meter men allround	1500 meter women allround 1500 meter men allround 5000 meter women allround 10,000 meter men allround

== Medalists ==
Event	Gold		Silver		Bronze	
Men's allround	Marcel Bosker	150.072	Beau Snellink	150.555	Kars Jansman	151.438
Women's allround	Merel Conijn	160.891	Joy Beune	161.862	Melissa Wijfje	162.987

=== Men's allround ===
Rank	Skater	500m	5000m	1500m	10,000m	Total points Samalog
1st place, gold medalist(s)	Marcel Bosker	37.22 (5)	6:16.50 (1)	1:46.60 (1)	13:13.38 (3)	150.072
2nd place, silver medalist(s)	Beau Snellink	37.81 (11)	6:17.31 (2)	1:48.30 (5)	12:58.29 (1)	150.555
3rd place, bronze medalist(s)	Kars Jansman	37.98 (12)	6:18.48 (3)	1:48.26 (4)	13:10.49 (2)	151.438
4	Chris Huizinga	37.32 (8)	6:23.42 (4)	1:48.32 (6)	13:40.27 (5)	152.781
5	Tjerk de Boer	36.20 (2)	6:35.32 (11)	1:46.87 (2)	13:54.24 (6)	153.067
6	Jeroen Janissen	38.50 (17)	6:28.64 (5)	1:51.06 (11)	13:33.03 (4)	155.035
7	Jesse Speijers	37.22 (5)	6:33.83 (10)	1:48.89 (7)	14:08.02 (7)	155.300
8	Jordy van Workum	37.05 (4)	6:33.60 (9)	1:47.78 (3)	DQ	112.336
9	Sijmen Egberts	37.60 (10)	6:36.57 (12)	1:50.06 (10)		113.943
10	Marwin Talsma	38.75 (18)	6:31.40 (7)	1:49.29 (8)		114.320
11	Jur Veenje	37.29 (7)	6:45.21 (16)	1:49.99 (9)		114.474
12	Lars Woelders	38.21 (16)	6:38.06 (13)	1:52.74 (14)		115.596
13	Bart Valentijn	38.04 (14)	6:46.03 (18)	1:52.64 (13)		116.189
14	Remo Slotegraaf	37.49 (9)	6:45.89 (17)	1:54.53 (16)		116.255
15	Colin Duivenvoorden	38.19 (15)	6:46.70 (19)	1:53.12 (15)		116.566
16	Jasper Krommenhoek	39.24 (19)	6:41.49 (14)	1:52.57 (12)		116.912
17	Bart Vreugdenhil	39.46 (20)	6:43.89 (15)	1:56.38 (17)		118.642
	Louis Hollaar	36.09 (1)	6:32.49 (8)			75.339
	Jan Blokhuijsen	36.86 (3)	6:29.09 (6)			75.769
	Lex Dijkstra	38.00 (13)	DQ			38.000

=== Women's allround ===
Rank	Skater	500m	3000m	1500m	5000m	Total points Samalog
1st place, gold medalist(s)	Merel Conijn	39.45 (3)	4:05.07 (2)	1:56.28 (2)	6:58.36 (1)	160.891
2nd place, silver medalist(s)	Joy Beune	40.08 (6)	4:04.51 (1)	1:55.90 (1)	7:03.98 (2)	161.862
3rd place, bronze medalist(s)	Melissa Wijfje	39.63 (5)	4:06.46 (4)	1:56.45 (3)	7:14.65 (4)	162.987
4	Reina Anema	40.96 (12)	4:05.20 (3)	1:57.73 (4)	7:09.49 (3)	164.018
5	Robin Groot	39.59 (4)	4:09.83 (7)	1:58.31 (6)	7:22.35 (7)	164.899
6	Aveline Hijlkema	40.36 (7)	4:09.51 (6)	1:58.90 (7)	7:18.24 (5)	165.402
7	Esther Kiel	40.78 (11)	4:10.57 (8)	2:00.77 (11)	7:19.58 (6)	166.755
8	Gioya Lancee	39.35 (2)	4:14.29 (9)	1:59.75 (9)	7:35.53 (8)	167.200
9	Elisa Dul	39.33 (1)	4:08.24 (5)	1:57.87 (5)		119.993
10	Paulien Verhaar	40.54 (9)	4:16.16 (11)	2:00.33 (10)		123.343
11	Leonie Bats	40.45 (8)	4:21.25 (15)	1:59.74 (8)		123.904
12	Kim Talsma	40.69 (10)	4:17.90 (13)	2:01.14 (12)		124.053
13	Eline van Voorden	41.35 (15)	4:18.95 (14)	2:05.11 (17)		126.211
14	Eline Jansen	42.53 (17)	4:15.95 (10)	2:03.59 (14)		126.384
15	Sterre Jonkers	42.13 (16)	4:16.58 (12)	2:04.48 (16)		126.386
16	Sanne Westra	40.97 (13)	4:27.29 (17)	2:04.20 (15)		126.918
17	Yael Prenger	41.04 (14)	4:27.89 (19)	2:05.34 (18)		127.468
18	Sophie Kraaijeveld	42.77 (19)	4:22.80 (16)	2:03.46 (13)		127.723
19	Veerle van Koppen	42.87 (20)	4:27.71 (18)	2:06.17 (19)		129.544
20	Lidia Tempert	42.59 (18)	4:32.85 (20)	2:10.14 (20)		131.445
