= 2022 KNSB Dutch Single Distance Championships – Men's 1500 m =

Dutch speed skating competition

- Venue: Thialf, Heerenveen
- Dates: 30 October 2021
- Competitors: 24 skaters

Medalist men
1st place, gold medalist(s)		Thomas Krol	NED
2nd place, silver medalist(s)		Kjeld Nuis	NED
3rd place, bronze medalist(s)		Chris Huizinga	NED

The men's 1500 meter at the 2022 KNSB Dutch Single Distance Championships in Heerenveen took place at the Thialf ice skating rink on Saturday 30 October 2021. There were 24 participants. Although the tournament was held in 2021 it was the 2022 edition as it was part of the 2021–2022 speed skating season. The first 5 skaters were eligible for the following World Cup tournaments.

== Statistics ==
=== Result ===
Rank	Skater	Time
1st place, gold medalist(s)	Thomas Krol	1:44.27
2nd place, silver medalist(s)	Kjeld Nuis	1:44.53
3rd place, bronze medalist(s)	Chris Huizinga	1:45.27
4	Patrick Roest	1:45.34
5	Jan Blokhuijsen	1:45.37
6	Wesly Dijs	1:45.39
7	Marcel Bosker	1:45.40
8	Tijmen Snel	1:45.95
9	Gert Wierda	1:46.38 PR
10	Serge Yoro	1:46.41
11	Joep Wennemars	1:46.44 PR
12	Lex Dijkstra	1:46.50 PR
13	Jordy van Workum	1:46.95
14	Tjerk de Boer	1:47.13
15	Yves Vergeer	1:47.25 PR
16	Jesse Speijers	1:47.74 PR
17	Thomas Geerdinck	1:47.84
18	Marwin Talsma	1:48.14
19	Sijmen Egberts	1:48.29 PR
20	Jur Veenje	1:48.49
21	Remo Slotegraaf	1:49.12
22	Chris Fredriks	1:49.42 PR
23	Rinze-Bart de Gree	1:52.72
NC	Louis Hollaar	DQ
NC	Joep Kalverdij	DNS
NC	Kai in 't Veld	DNS

Referee: Bert Timmermans. Assistant: Wil Schildwacht. Starter: Jans Rosing
Start: 14:54.00 hr. Finish: 15:35.27 hr.

=== Draw ===
Heat	Inner lane	Outer lane
1	Chris Fredriks	Rinze-Bart de Glee
2	Tjerk de Boer	Gert Wierda
3	Joep Wennemars	Sijmen Egberts
4	Jesse Speijers	Remo Slotegraaf
5	Jur Veenje	Thomas Geerdinck
6	Yves Vergeer	Lex Dijkstra
7	Marwin Talsma	Chris Huizinga
8	Jordy van Workum	Jan Blokhuijsen
9	Marcel Bosker	Serge Yoro
10	Wesly Dijs	Louis Hollaar
11	Kjeld Nuis	Tijmen Snel
12	Thomas Krol	Patrick Roest
