= 2022 KNSB Dutch Single Distance Championships – Men's 5000 m =

Dutch speed skating competition

- Venue: Thialf, Heerenveen
- Dates: 29 October 2021
- Competitors: 20 skaters

Medalist men
1st place, gold medalist(s)		Jorrit Bergsma	NED
2nd place, silver medalist(s)		Patrick Roest	NED
3rd place, bronze medalist(s)		Marwin Talsma	NED

The men's 5000 meter at the 2022 KNSB Dutch Single Distance Championships took place in Heerenveen at the Thialf ice skating rink on Friday 29 October 2021. There were 20 participants. Although the tournament was held in 2021 it was the 2022 edition as it was part of the 2021–2022 speed skating season. The first 5 skaters were eligible for the following World Cup tournaments.

== Statistics ==
=== Result ===
Rank	Skater	Time
1st place, gold medalist(s)	Jorrit Bergsma	6:07.30
2nd place, silver medalist(s)	Patrick Roest	6:10.84
3rd place, bronze medalist(s)	Marwin Talsma	6:14.31
4	Marcel Bosker	6:15.35
5	Sven Kramer	6:16.06
6	Victor Ramler	6:18.30 PR
7	Jos de Vos	6:18.43 PR
8	Kars Jansma	6:18.63
9	Jan Blokhuijsen	6:19.29
10	Lex Dijkstra	6:19.79 PR
11	Chris Huizinga	6:21.54
12	Crispijn Ariëns	6:22.06 PR
13	Beau Snellink	6:22.6
14	Jordy van Workum	6:25.77 PR
15	Yves Vergeer	6:28.52 PR
16	Jesse Speijers	6:31.36 PR
17	Bart Mol	6:33.41
18	Harm Visser	6:14.48 PR
19	Ids Bouma	6:36.75
20	Remo Slotegraaf	6:43.72

Referee: Bert Timmerman. Assistant: Wil Schildacht Starter: Jan Rosing
Start: 18:56.00 hr. Finish: 20:29.40 hr.

=== Draw ===
Heat	Inner lane	Outer lane
1	Bart Mol	Harm Visser
2	Jos de Vos	Yves Vergeer
3	Jordy van Workum	Jesse Speijers
4	Remo Slotegraaf	Ids Bouma
5	Victor Ramler	Jan Blokhuijsen
6	Lex Dijkstra	Kars Jansma
7	Chris Huizinga	Crispijn Ariëns
8	Jorrit Bergsma	Patrick Roest
9	Marwin Talsma	Sven Kramer
10	Marcel Bosker	Beau Snellink
