= 2023 KNSB Dutch Single Distance Championships =

Dutch speed skating competition

- Venue: Thialf, Heerenveen
- Dates: 3 February—5 February 2023
- Competitors: 87 athletes (44 women and 43 men)

The 2023 KNSB Dutch Single Distance Championships took place in Heerenveen at the Thialf ice skating rink from Friday 3 February 2023 to Sunday 5 February 2023. The best skaters qualified for the 2023 ISU World Speed Skating Championships in Heerenveen.

== Schedule ==
Schedule
Date	Starting time	Event
Friday; 3 February 2023	18:15	Men's 5000 meter Men's 500 meter(1); Women's 1500 meter Men's 500 meter(2)
Saturday; 4 February 2023	14:00	Women's 500 meter(1); Women's 3000 meter Women's 500 meter(2); Men's 1500 meter
Sunday; 5 February 2023	12:45	Men's 10000 meter Women's 5000 meter Men's 1000 meter Women's 1000 meter Men's Mass Start; Women's Mass Start

== Medalists ==
=== Men ===
Distance	Gold		Silver		Bronze	
500m details	Merijn Scheperkamp	34.61—34.81 69.420	Hein Otterspeer	34.91—35.04 69.950	Stefan Westenbroek	35.04—34.93 69.970
1000m details	Kjeld Nuis	1:08.04	Hein Otterspeer	1:08.08	Thomas Krol	1:08.37
1500m details	Patrick Roest	1:44.55	Thomas Krol	1:44.86	Kjeld Nuis	1:44.89
5000m details	Patrick Roest	6:08.77	Marcel Bosker	6:12.95	Jorrit Bergsma	6:13.37
10000m details	Patrick Roest	12:47.22	Jorrit Bergsma	12:50.88	Kars Jansma	13:05.70
Mass start details	Jorrit Bergsma	7:23.54	Harm Visser	7:23.95	Bart Hoolwerf	7:25.71

=== Women ===
Distance	Gold		Silver		Bronze	
500m details	Femke Kok	37.48—37.64 77.120	Jutta Leerdam	37.80—37.53 75.330	Michelle de Jong	37.74—37.39 75.390
1000m details	Jutta Leerdam	1:13.58	Antoinette Rijpma-de Jong	1:14.86	Michelle de Jong	1:14.96
1500m details	Antoinette Rijpma-de Jong	1:53.20	Marijke Groenewoud	1:53.48	Jutta Leerdam	1:53.64
3000m details	Antoinette Rijpma-de Jong	3:58.48	Joy Beune	3:58.65	Irene Schouten	4:02.83
5000m details	Irene Schouten	6:50.36	Sanne in 't Hof	6:51.78	Marijke Groenewoud	6:52.37
Mass start details	Irene Schouten	8:24.24	Marijke Groenewoud	8:28.01	Elisa Dul	8:28.22
