= 2022 KNSB Dutch Single Distance Championships – Men's mass start =

Dutch speed skating competition

2022 KNSB Dutch Single Distance Championships – Men's Mass Start
- Venue: Thialf, Heerenveen
- Dates: 31 October 2021
- Competitors: 28 skaters

Medalist men
1st place, gold medalist(s)		Bart Hoolwerf	NED
2nd place, silver medalist(s)		Jan Blokhuijsen	NED
3rd place, bronze medalist(s)		Victor Ramler	NED

The men's Mass Start at the 2022 KNSB Dutch Single Distance Championships in Heerenveen took place at Thialf ice skating rink on Sunday 31 October 2021. There were 28 skaters participating. Although the tournament was held in 2021 it was the 2022 edition as it was part of the 2021–2022 speed skating season.

== Result ==
Position	Skater	Rounds	Points sprint 1	Points sprint 2	Points sprint 3	Points finish	Points total	Time
1st place, gold medalist(s)	Bart Hoolwerf	16				60	60	7:34.91
2nd place, silver medalist(s)	Jan Blokhuijsen	16				40	40	7:34..96
3rd place, bronze medalist(s)	Victor Ramler	16				20	20	7:35.12
4	Sjoerd den Hertog	16				10	10	7:35.14
5	Jeroen Janissen	16				6	6	7:35.67
6	Robert Post	16	3		1		4	7:43.29
7	Tom den Heijer	16					3	7:35.75
8	Homme Jan de Groot	16		3		3	3	7:48.45
9	Casper de Gier	16			3		3	8:53.05
10	Chris Huizinga	16			2		2	7:36.40
11	Jordy Harink	16	2				2	7:39.63
12	Daan Gelling	16		2			2	7:40.90
13	Beau Snellink	16		1			1	7:37.90
14	Ids Bouma	16	1				1	7:58.13
15	Evert Hoolwerf	16					0	7:35.79
16	Kevin Hoekstra	16					0	7:38.39
17	Jorrit Bergsma	16					0	7:39.15
18	Axel Koopman	16					0	7:40.96
19	Yves Vergeer	16					0	7:41.07
20	Lars Woelders	16					0	7:49.34
21	Crispijn Ariëns	16					0	7:49.67
22	Harm Visser	16					0	7:55.77
23	Jos de Vos	16					0	7:58.11
24	Mats Stoltenborg	16					0	8:16.60
25	Marcel Bosker	16					0	8:38.90
26	Bart Mol	13					0	6:55.20
27	Stefan Wolffenbuttel	12					0	5:56.07
28	Tjerk de Boer	12					0	5:56.25

Referee: Dina Melis. Starter: André de Vries.
Start: 17:12.00 hr. Finish: 17:29.03 hr.
