= 2020 KNSB Dutch Single Distance Championships =

KNSB Dutch Single Distance Championships
- Venue: Thialf, Heerenveen
- Dates: 27-29 December 2019

The 2020 KNSB Dutch Single Distance Championships were held at the Thialf skating rink in Heerenveen from Friday 27 December 2019 to Sunday 29 December 2019. Although the tournament was held in 2019 it was the 2020 edition, and it was part of the 2019–2020 speed skating season.

== Schedule ==
Schedule
Date	Starting time	Event
Friday; 27 December 2019	18:20	Men's 500 meter Women's 1500 meter Men's 5000 meter
Saturday; 28 December 2019	15:25	Women's 500 meter Men's 1500 meter Women's 3000 meter
Sunday; 29 December 2019	13:10	Women's 5000 meter Men's 10.000 meter Women's 1000 meter Men's 1000 meter Men's Mass start Women's Mass start

== Medalists ==
=== Men ===
Distance	Gold		Silver		Bronze	
500m details	Dai Dai N'tab	34.7	Jan Smeekens	34.81	Kai Verbij	34.87
1000m details	Thomas Krol	1:08.35	Kai Verbij	1:08.53	Koen Verweij	1:08.87
1500m details	Thomas Krol	1:43.86	Patrick Roest	1:44.78	Koen Verweij	1:45.89
5000m details	Patrick Roest	6:09.79	Sven Kramer	6:10.91	Jorrit Bergsma	6:14.65
10000m details	Jorrit Bergsma	12:45.04	Patrick Roest	12:48.59	Marvin Talsma	12:59.12
Mass start details	Arjan Stroetinga	7:35.62	Koen Verweij	7:35.69	Jan Blokhuijsen	7:35.90

=== Women ===
Distance	Gold		Silver		Bronze	
500m details	Jutta Leerdam	37.75	Letitia de Jong	37.83	Femke Kok	38.14
1000m details	Jutta Leerdam	1:14.24	Letitia de Jong	1:14.68	Ireen Wüst	1:15.64
1500m details	Melissa Wijfje	1:55.56	Ireen Wüst	1:55.69	Joy Beune	1:55.87
3000m details	Esmee Visser	4:01.21	Irene Schouten	4:01.80	Carlijn Achtereekte	4:02.20
5000m details	Esmee Visser	6:50.96	Irene Schouten	6:54.87	Carlijn Achtereekte	6:55.04
Mass start details	Irene Schouten	8:20.79	Marijke Groenewoud	8.20.79	Suzanne Schulting	8:21.48
