= 2021 KNSB Dutch Single Distance Championships – Men's 1500 m =

- Venue: Thialf, Heerenveen
- Dates: 31 October 2020
- Competitors: 18 skaters

Medalist men
1st place, gold medalist(s)		Thomas Krol	NED
2nd place, silver medalist(s)		Patrick Roest	NED
3rd place, bronze medalist(s)		Wesly Dijs	NED

The men's 1500 meter at the 2021 KNSB Dutch Single Distance Championships in Heerenveen took place at the Thialf ice skating rink on Saturday 31 October 2020. There were 18 participants.

== Statistics ==
=== Result ===
Rank	Skater	Time
1st place, gold medalist(s)	Thomas Krol	1:44.30
2nd place, silver medalist(s)	Patrick Roest	1:45.00
3rd place, bronze medalist(s)	Wesly Dijs	1:45.30 PR
4	Tijmen Snel	1:46.93 PR
5	Louis Hollaar	1:47.40
6	Sven Kramer	1:47.45
7	Marcel Bosker	1:47.46
8	Chris Huizinga	1:47.66
9	Serge Yoro	1:47.68 PR
10	Marwin Talsma	1:47.90 PR
11	Merijn Scheperkamp	1:48.28 PR
12	Jan Blokhuijsen	1:48.69
13	Tjerk De Boer	1:49.74
14	Thomas Geerdinck	1:49.89
15	Jos De Vos	1:50.48
16	Jesse Speijers	1:50.80
17	Teun De Wit	1:51.21
NC	Kjeld Nuis	DNS

Referee: Berri de Jonge. Assistant: Rieks van Lubek
Starter: Jan Rosing

=== Draw ===
Heat	Inner lane	Outer lane
1		Tijmen Snel
2	Jesse Speijers	Marwin Talsma
3	Merijn Scheperkamp	Serge Yoro
4	Teun De Wit	Tjerk De Boer
5	Louis Hollaar	Jos De Vos
6	Chris Huizinga	Wesly Dijs
7	Thomas Geerdinck	Sven Kramer
8	Patrick Roest	Thomas Krol
9	Jan Blokhuijsen	Marcel Bosker
