= 2023 KNSB Dutch Single Distance Championships – Men's mass start =

Dutch speed skating competition

2023 KNSB Dutch Single Distance Championships – Men's Mass Start
- Venue: Thialf, Heerenveen
- Dates: 5 February 2023
- Competitors: 22 skaters

Medalist men
1st place, gold medalist(s)		Jorrit Bergsma	NED
2nd place, silver medalist(s)		Harm Visser	NED
3rd place, bronze medalist(s)		Bart Hoolwerf	NED

The men's Mass Start at the 2023 KNSB Dutch Single Distance Championships took place in Heerenveen at the Thialf ice skating rink on Sunday 5 February 2023. There were 22 participants. Jorrit Bergsma and Harm Visser qualified for the 2023 ISU World Speed Skating Championships in Heerenveen.

== Result ==
Rank	Skater	Points	Time
1st place, gold medalist(s)	Jorrit Bergsma	63	7:23.54
2nd place, silver medalist(s)	Harm Visser	42	7:23.95
3rd place, bronze medalist(s)	Bart Hoolwerf	20	7:25.71
4	Mats Stoltenborg	10	7:29.58
5	Chris Huizinga	8	7:30.05
6	Jeroen Janissen	4	7:35.72
7	Casper de Gier	3	7:59.35
8	Victor Ramler	3	21:35.27
NC	Kars Jansman	3	DNF
NC	Beau Snellink	2	DNF
11	Robert Post	0	7:48.47
12	Matthé Pronk	0	7:48.59
13	Jesse de Lange	0	7:48.74
14	Rick Meijer	0	7:48.80
15	Kayo Vos	0	7:53.59
16	Jordy van Workum	0	8:02.56
NC	Kevin Hoekstra	0	DNF
NC	Daan Besteman	0	DNF
NC	Mathijs van Zwieten	0	DNF
NC	Homme-Jan de Groot	0	DNF
NC	Evert Hoolwerf	0	DNF
NC	Marcel Bosker	0	DNF

- DNF = Did not finish
- NC = No classification

Referee: Wycher Bos. Assistant: Björn Fetlaar. Starter: Wim van Biezen.
