= 2019 KNSB Dutch Single Distance Championships =

KNSB Dutch Single Distance Championships
- Venue: Thialf, Heerenveen
- Dates: 28-30 December 2018

The 2019 KNSB Dutch Single Distance Championships were held at the Thialf ice stadium in Heerenveen from Friday 28 December 2018 to Sunday 30 December 2018. Although the tournament was held in 2018 it was the 2019 edition as it was part of the 2018–2019 speed skating season.

== Schedule ==
Schedule
Date	Time	Distance
Friday; 28 December 2018	14:30	Men's 500 meter Women's 1500 meter Men's 5000 meter
Saturday; 29 December 2018	14:15	Women's 500 meter Men's 1500 meter Women's 3000 meter
Sunday; 30 December 2018	12:30	Women's 5000 meter Men's 10,000 meter Women's 1000 meter Men's 1000 meter Women's mass start Men's mass start

== Medalists ==
=== Men ===
Distance	Gold		Silver		Bronze	
500m details	Ronald Mulder	34.60	Dai Dai Ntab	34.72	Jan Smeekens	34.88
1000m details	Kjeld Nuis	1:08.16	Thomas Krol	1:08.25	Kai Verbij	1:08.26
1500m details	Kjeld Nuis	1:44.02	Patrick Roest	1:44.20	Thomas Krol	1:44.74
5000m details	Patrick Roest	6:09.36	Jorrit Bergsma	6:12.68	Sven Kramer	6:13.82
10000m details	Jorrit Bergsma	12:43.70	Patrick Roest	12:50.86	Douwe de Vries	15:56.61
Mass start details	Douwe de Vries	7:31.79	Victor Ramler	7:31.86	Arjan Stroetinga	7:31.98

=== Women ===
Distance	Gold		Silver		Bronze	
500m details	Janine Smit	38.22	Letitia de Jong	38.31	Jutta Leerdam	38.41
1000m details	Ireen Wüst	1:14.86	Antoinette de Jong	1:15.27	Jutta Leerdam	1:15.31
1500m details	Ireen Wüst	1:55.39	Antoinette de Jong	1:56.04	Melissa Wijfje	1:56.70
3000m details	Antoinette de Jong	4:00.64	Ireen Wüst	4:01.29	Carlijn Achtereekte	4:01.77
5000m details	Esmee Visser	6:9.49	Carien Kleibeuker	6:56.06	Carlijn Achtereekte	6:56.06
Mass start details	Irene Schouten	8:42.88	Marijke Groenewoud	8:43.28	Elisa Dul	8:44.69
