= Bob de Vries =

Dutch speed skater

Personal information
- Born: 16 December 1984 (age 41) Haule, Netherlands

Sport
- Country: Netherlands
- Sport: Speed skating
Medal record
Men's speed skating
Representing the Netherlands
World Single Distance Championships
Silver medal – second place	2011 Inzell	10000 m
Bronze medal – third place	2011 Inzell	Team pursuit
Dutch Marathon Championships
Gold medal – first place	2011 Belterwiede	Natural ice

Bob de Vries (born 16 December 1984) is a Dutch former marathon speed skater and long track speed skater. He is the brother of Elma de Vries.

== Personal records ==
Personal records
Men's speed skating
Event	Result	Date	Location	Notes
500 meter	39.56	21 November 2020	Heerenveen	
1000 meter	1:19.63	4 March 2007	Assen	
1500 meter	1:51.04	15 October 2017	Inzell	
3000 meter	3:42.04	16 December 2017	Inzell	
5000 meter	6:10.48	1 December 2019	Calgary	
10000 meter	12:43.57	21 January 2015	Salt Lake city	

De Vries has a score of 151.799 points on the Adelskalendern.

== Tournament overview ==
Season	Dutch Championships Single Distances	World Championships Single Distances	World Cup GWC	Olympic Games	Dutch Championships Allround
2008–09	HEERENVEEN 14th 5000m				
2009–10	HEERENVEEN 11th 5000m 6th 10000m		30th 5000/10000m (silver) team pursuit		
2010–11	HEERENVEEN (gold) 5000m (silver) 10000m	INZELL (silver) 10000m (bronze) team pursuit	(bronze) 5000/10000m 8th team pursuit		
2011–12	HEERENVEEN 9th 5000m 6th 10000m	HEERENVEEN 6th 10000m	16th 5000/10000m		
2012–13	HEERENVEEN 20th 5000m 9th 10000m 20th mass start		32nd 5000/10000m		
2013–14	HEERENVEEN 20th 5000m 9th 10000m 12th mass start		30th 5000/10000m (gold) mass start		
2014–15	HEERENVEEN 10th 5000m 8th 10000m 8th mass start				
2015–16	HEERENVEEN 5th 5000m (bronze) 10000m		25th 5000/10000m		
2016–17	HEERENVEEN 5th 5000m (bronze) 10000m		22nd 5000/10000m		
2017–18	HEERENVEEN 4th 5000m 7th 10000m		19th 5000/10000m 7th team pursuit	GANGNEUNG 15th 5000m	
2018–19	HEERENVEEN 8th 5000m 4th 10000m 9th mass start				
2019–20	HEERENVEEN 16th 5000m 6th 10000m				
2020–21	HEERENVEEN 9th 5000m 8th 10000m				HEERENVEEN 18th 500m 9th 5000m 17th 1500m DNQ 10000m DNQ overall(17)

- DNQ = Did not qualify for the last distance

== World Cup ==
Season	5000m/10000m					
2009–2010	–	–	–	–	1st(b) –	
2010–2011	5th	8th	5th*	6th	(bronze) *	3rd place, bronze medalist(s)
2011–2012	–	–	3rd place, bronze medalist(s)	–	(gold) *	–
2012–2013	–	–	–*	12th	DQ	
2013–2014	–	–	2nd(b)	–	–	–
2014–2015						
2015–2016	–	1st(b)	–	–	–	
2016–2017	—	—	4th(b)	1st(b)	–	–
2017–2018	12th	–	1st(b)	8th	–	–

Season	Team pursuit			
2009–2010	–	–	4th –	
2010–2011	3rd place, bronze medalist(s)	5th	DQ	
2011–2012				
2012–2013				
2013–2014				
2014–2015				
2015–2016				
2016–2017				
2017–2018	–	–	10th	–

- DQ = Disqualified
- (b) = Division B
- – = Did not participate
- * = 10000 meter

== Career highlights ==
2003–04
Essent Cup, Overall Men's B-Class, 1st (gold)
2004–05
Essent Cup, Groningen, 2nd (silver)
Essent Cup, Alkmaar, 3rd (bronze)
Essent Cup, Overall Men's A-Class, 1st (gold) (juniors)
2005–06
Essent Cup, Eindhoven, 3rd (bronze)
2006–07
Essent Cup, Eindhoven, 3rd (bronze)
The Greenery Six, Groningen, 2nd (silver)
Essent Cup, Assen, 3rd (bronze)
Essent Three Days, Groningen day 1 stage 2, 2nd (silver)
A-Class race, Hoorn, 1st (gold)
Essent Cup, Alkmaar, 3rd (bronze)
The Greenery Six, Men's A-Class, 1st (gold) (juniors)
2007–08
KNSB Cup, Heerenveen (1), 1st (gold)
Essent Cup, Assen (1), 1st (gold)
KNSB Cup, Haarlem, 3rd (bronze)
Essent Cup, Amsterdam, 2nd (silver)
KNSB Cup, The Hague, 2nd (silver)
Essent Cup, Utrecht, 3rd (bronze)
KNSB Cup, Hoorn, 2nd (silver)
KNSB Cup, Geleen, 1st (gold)
KNSB Cup, Deventer, 1st (gold)
IJSCH Natural ice marathon, Haaksbergen, 2nd (silver)
KNSB Cup, Breda, 3rd (bronze)
Essent Cup, Assen (2), 1st (gold)
Essent Cup, Eindhoven, 3rd (bronze)
KNSB Cup, Heerenveen (2), 1st (gold)
KNSB Cup, Alkmaar, 2nd (silver)
Essent Cup, Overall Men's A-Class, 1st (gold)
KNSB Cup, Overall Men's A-Class, 1st (gold)
