= 2020 KNSB Dutch Single Distance Championships – Men's mass start =

Dutch speed skating competition

2020 KNSB Dutch Single Distance Championships – Men's Mass Start
- Venue: Thialf, Heerenveen
- Dates: 29 December 2019
- Competitors: 30 skaters

Medalist men
1st place, gold medalist(s)		Arjan Stroetinga	NED
2nd place, silver medalist(s)		Koen Verweij	NED
3rd place, bronze medalist(s)		Jan Blokhuijsen	NED

The men's Mass Start at the 2020 KNSB Dutch Single Distance Championships in Heerenveen took place at Thialf ice skating rink on Sunday 29 December 2019.

== Result ==
Position	Skater	Rounds	Points sprint 1	Points sprint 2	Points sprint 3	Points finish	Points total	Time
1st place, gold medalist(s)	Arjan Stroetinga	16				60	60	7:35.62
2nd place, silver medalist(s)	Koen Verweij	16				40	40	7:35.69
3rd place, bronze medalist(s)	Jan Blokhuijsen	16				20	20	7:35.90
4	Marcel Bosker	16				10	10	7:37.14
5	Kevin Hoekstra	16				6	6	7:37.33
6	Victor Ramler	16				3	3	7:37.81
7	Daan Breeuwsma	16	3				3	7:44.97
8	Friso Emons	16			3		3	7:46.25
9	Luc ter Haar	16		3			3	8:42.01
10	Beau Snellink	16		2			2	7:40.51
11	Harm Visser	16				2	2	7:40.96
12	Jorrit Bergsma	16	2				2	7:41.06
13	Jordy Van Workum	16			1		1	7:42.34
14	Mats Stoltenborg	16		1			1	7:47.17
15	Evert Hoolwerf	16	1				1	7:58.94
16	Teun De Wit	16					–	7:38.82
17	Thomas Geerdinck	16					–	7:39.86
18	Tom Den Heijer	16					–	7:40.50
19	Johan Knol	16					–	7:41.11
20	Chris Huizinga	16					–	7:41.15
21	Gary Hekman	16					–	7:42.17
22	Marco Van Der Tuin	16					–	7:42.28
23	Daan Besteman	16					–	7:43.42
24	Jordy Harink	16					–	7:48.14
25	Willem Hoolwerf	16					–	8:09.30
26	Bart Hoolwerf	13					–	6:21.63
NC	Kars Jansman							DNS
NC	Merijn Scheperkamp							DNS
NC	Marwin Talsma							DNS
NC	Yves Vergeer							DNS

Referee: Rieks van Lubek. Starter: Sieme Kok
Start: 17:43 hr. Finish: 18:20 hr.
