= 2023 KNSB Dutch Single Distance Championships – Men's 1500 m =

Dutch speed skating competition

2023KNSB Dutch Single Distance Championships – Men's 1500 m
- Venue: Thialf, Heerenveen
- Dates: 4 February 2023
- Competitors: 20 skaters

Medalist men
1st place, gold medalist(s)		Patrick Roest	NED
2nd place, silver medalist(s)		Thomas Krol	NED
3rd place, bronze medalist(s)		Kjeld Nuis	NED

The men's 1500 meter at the 2023 KNSB Dutch Single Distance Championships in Heerenveen took place at the Thialf ice skating rink on Saturday 4 February 2023. There were 20 participants. Patrick Roest, Thomas Krol, and Kjeld Nuis qualified for the 2023 ISU World Speed Skating Championships in Heerenveen.

== Statistics ==
=== Result ===
Rank	Skater	Time
1st place, gold medalist(s)	Patrick Roest	1:44.55
2nd place, silver medalist(s)	Thomas Krol	1:44.86
3rd place, bronze medalist(s)	Kjeld Nuis	1:44.89
4	Wesly Dijs	1:45.01
5	Marcel Bosker	1:45.91
6	Chris Huizinga	1:46.41
7	Louis Hollaar	1:46.64
8	Lex Dijkstra	1:46.80
9	Joep Wennemars	1:46.84
10	Serge Yoro	1:47.37
11	Remo Slotegraaf	1:47.51
12	Kayo Vos	1:48.56
13	Mats Siemons	1:48.57
14	Gert Wierda	1:48.61
15	Jordy van Workum	1:48.71
16	Tijmen Snel	1:48.95
17	Joost van Dobbenburgh	1:50.06
18	Tim Prins	1:50.30
19	Victor Ramler	1:52.30
NC	Chris Fredriks	DQ

- DQ = Disqualified

Referee: Bert Timmermans. Assistant: Frank Spoel. Starter: Wim van Biezen

=== Draw ===
Heat	Inner lane	Outer lane
1	Tim Prins	Victor Ramler
2	Joost van Dobbenburgh	Kayo Vos
3	Serge Yoro	Mats Siemons
4	Chris Fredriks	Gert Wierda
5	Remo Slotegraaf	Marcel Bosker
6	Chris Huizinga	Joep Wennemars
7	Lex Dijkstra	Tijmen Snel
8	Wesly Dijs	Patrick Roest
9	Thomas Krol	Kjeld Nuis
10	Jordy van Workum	Louis Hollaar
