= 2020 KNSB Dutch Single Distance Championships – Men's 1500 m =

- Venue: Thialf, Heerenveen
- Dates: 28 December 2019
- Competitors: 20 skaters

Medalist men
1st place, gold medalist(s)		Thomas Krol	NED
2nd place, silver medalist(s)		Patrick Roest	NED
3rd place, bronze medalist(s)		Koen Verweij	NED

The men's 1500 meter at the 2020 KNSB Dutch Single Distance Championships took place in Heerenveen at the Thialf ice skating rink on Saturday 28 December 2019. There were 20 participants.

== Result ==
Position	Skater	Time
1st place, gold medalist(s)	Thomas Krol	1:43.86
2nd place, silver medalist(s)	Patrick Roest	1:44.78
3rd place, bronze medalist(s)	Koen Verweij	1:45.89
4	Wesly Dijs	1:46.05 PR
5	Chris Huizinga	1:47.04
6	Marcel Bosker	1:47.16
7	Sven Kramer	1:47.43
8	Douwe de Vries	1:47.81
9	Merijn Scheperkamp	1:48.55
10	Gijs Esders	1:48.91
11	Thomas Geerdinck	1:49.24
12	Jos de Vos	1:49.31
13	Serge Yoro	1:49.38 PR
14	Tjerk de Boer	1:49.71
15	Teun de Wit	1:49.81
16	Jur Veentje	1:49.91 PR
17	Jordy van Workum	1:50.38
18	Victor Ramler	1:50.83
19	Remo Slotegraaf	1:52.16 PR
20	Jan Blokhuijsen	DQ

=== Draw ===
Heat	Inside lane	Outside lane
1	Jur Veentje	Remo Slotegraaf
2	Gijs Esders	Teun de Wit
3	Serge Yoro	Merijn Scheperkamp
4	Victor Ramler	Jordy van Workum
5	Thomas Geerdinck	Chris Huizinga
6	Tjerk de Boer	Jan Blokhuijsen
7	Douwe de Vries	Jos de Vos
8	Wesly Dijs	Thomas Krol
9	Marcel Bosker	Koen Verweij
10	Sven Kramer	Patrick Roest
