= Beau Snellink =

Dutch speed skater (born 2001)

Personal information
- Nationality: Dutch
- Born: 14 May 2001 (age 25) Noorden, Netherlands

Sport
- Country: Netherlands
- Sport: Speed skating
Medal record
Men's speed skating
Representing the Netherlands
World Single Distances Championships
Gold medal – first place	2021 Heerenveen	Team pursuit
Gold medal – first place	2023 Heerenveen	Team pursuit
Silver medal – second place	2025 Hamar	5000 m
Bronze medal – third place	2025 Hamar	Team pursuit
European Championships
Bronze medal – third place	2025 Heerenveen	Allround

Beau Snellink (born 14 May 2001) is a Dutch speed skater.

He won the gold medal in the team pursuit event at the 2021 World Single Distances Speed Skating Championships. and repeated this again in 2023.

== Personal records ==
Personal records
Speed skating
Event	Result	Date	Location	Notes
500 meter	37.67	27 December 2022	Thialf, Heerenveen	
1000 meter	1:12.82	15 January 2022	Thialf, Heerenveen	
1500 meter	1:46.82	29 December 2024	Thialf, Heerenveen	
3000 meter	3:42.50	15 January 2021	Thialf, Heerenveen	
5000 meter	6:06.99	21 November 2025	Olympic Oval, Calgary	
10000 meter	12:39.35	25 January 2025	Olympic Oval, Calgary	
Team pursuit	3:40.33	22 January 2021	Thialf, Heerenveen	with Patrick Roest and Marcel Bosker

At the end of the 2022–2023 speed skating season Snellink occupied the 57th position on the adelskalender with a score of 148.993 points

== Tournament overview ==
Season	Dutch Championships Single Distances	Dutch Championships Allround	World Championships Single Distances	World Cup	European Championships Allround
2019–20	HEERENVEEN 10th mass start				
2020–21	HEERENVEEN 12th 5000m	HEERENVEEN 14th 500m 4th 5000m 10th 1500m 5th 10000m 6th overall	HEERENVEEN (gold) team pursuit	(silver) team pursuit	
2021–22	HEERENVEEN 13th 5000m 8th 10000m 13th mass start	HEERENVEEN 11th 500m (silver) 5000m 5th 1500m (gold) 10000m (silver) overall			
2022–23	HEERENVEEN 4th 5000m 4th 10000m 19th mass start	HEERENVEEN 13th 500m (silver) 5000m 7th 1500m (silver) 10000m (silver) overall	HEERENVEEN (gold) team pursuit	(gold) team pursuit	HAMAR 8th 500m 4th 5000m 8th 1500m 4th 10000 6th overall
