= 2022 KNSB Dutch Single Distance Championships – Men's 10,000 m =

Dutch speed skating competition

2022 KNSB Dutch Single Distance Championships – Men's 10000 m
- Venue: Thialf, Heerenveen
- Dates: 31 October 2021
- Competitors: 12 skaters

Medalist men
1st place, gold medalist(s)		Jorrit Bergsma	NED
2nd place, silver medalist(s)		Patrick Roest	NED
3rd place, bronze medalist(s)		Marwin Talsma	NED

The men's 10,000 meter at the 2022 KNSB Dutch Single Distance Championships took place in Heerenveen at the Thialf ice skating rink on Sunday 31 October 2021. There were 12 participants. Although the tournament was held in 2021 it was the 2022 edition as it was part of the 2021–2022 speed skating season.

== Statistics ==
=== Result ===
Rank	Skater	Time
1st place, gold medalist(s)	Jorrit Bergsma	12:39.67
2nd place, silver medalist(s)	Patrick Roest	12:48.05
3rd place, bronze medalist(s)	Marwin Talsma	12:50.91 PR
4	Marcel Bosker	13:04.26
5	Victor Ramler	13:05.66 PR
6	Kars Jansman	13:07.12
7	Jos de Vos	13:08.35 PR
8	Beau Snellink	13:12.83
9	Lex Dijkstra	13:16.35 PR
10	Crispijn Ariëns	13:30.72
11	Jordy van Workum	13:37.04
12	Mats Stoltenberg	DQ

=== Draw ===
Heat	Inner lane	Outer lane
1	Jordy van Workum	Jos de Vos
2	Crispijn Ariëns	Lex Dijkstra
3	Victor Ramler	Mats Stoltenberg
4	Beau Snellink	Kars Jansman
5	Marwin Talsma	Jorrit Bergsma
6	Marcel Bosker	Patrick Roest

Referee: Berri Timmerman. Assistant: Wil Schildwacht. Starter: André de Vries
Start: 12:15.00 hr. Finish: 1:59.09 hr.
