= 2017 KNSB Dutch Single Distance Championships – Men's 1500 m =

- Venue: Thialf, Heerenveen
- Dates: 29 December 2016
- Competitors: 20 skaters

Medalist men
1st place, gold medalist(s)		Sven Kramer	NED
2nd place, silver medalist(s)		Kjeld Nuis	NED
3rd place, bronze medalist(s)		Patrick Roest	NED

The men's 1500 meter at the 2017 KNSB Dutch Single Distance Championships took place in Heerenveen at the Thialf ice skating rink on Thursday 29 December 2016. There were 20 participants.

== Statistics ==
=== Result ===
Position	Skater	Heat	Lane	Time
1st place, gold medalist(s)	Sven Kramer	8	I	1:45.82
2nd place, silver medalist(s)	Kjeld Nuis	9	I	1:46.05
3rd place, bronze medalist(s)	Patrick Roest	8	O	1:46.15 PR
4	Koen Verweij	10	I	1:46.66
5	Thomas Krol	10	O	1:46.68
6	Lucas van Alphen	6	O	1:47.03 PR
7	Jan Blokhuijsen	5	O	1:47.19
8	Marcel Bosker	5	I	1:47.67 PR
9	Wesly Dijs	4	O	1:48.57 PR
10	Thijs Roozen	3	O	1:48.63
11	Douwe de Vries	9	O	1:48.64
12	Lennart Velema	6	I	1:49.27
13	Jos de Vos	7	O	1:49.62
14	Chris Huizinga	7	I	1:49.73 PR
15	Martijn van Oosten	3	I	1:50.05
16	Louis Hollaar	2	I	1:50.64 PR
17	Willem Hoolwerf	1	I	1:51.03
18	Pieter van Velde	1	O	1:51.15 PR
19	Sander Meijerink	4	I	1:51.66
20	Lex Dijkstra	2	O	1:51.98

Referee: Dina Melis. Assistant: Loretta Staring
Starter: Raymond Micka
Start: 18:22 hr. Finish: 18:51 hr.

=== Draw ===
Heat	Inside lane	Outside lane
1	Willem Hoolwerf	Pieter van Velde
2	Louis Hollaar	Lex Dijkstra
3	Martijn van Oosten	Thijs Roozen
4	Sander Meijerink	Wesly Dijs
5	Marcel Bosker	Jan Blokhuijsen
6	Lennart Velema	Lucas van Alphen
7	Chris Huizinga	Jos de Vos
8	Sven Kramer	Patrick Roest
9	Kjeld Nuis	Douwe de Vries
10	Koen Verweij	Thomas Krol
