= 2020 World Single Distances Speed Skating Championships – Men's mass start =

Men's mass start at the 2020 World Single Distances Speed Skating Championships
- Venue: Utah Olympic Oval
- Location: Salt Lake City, United States
- Dates: February 16
- Competitors: 24 from 17 nations
- Winning points: 60

Medalists
gold medal	Jorrit Bergsma	Netherlands
silver medal	Jordan Belchos	Canada
bronze medal	Antoine Gélinas-Beaulieu	Canada

The Men's mass start competition at the 2020 World Single Distances Speed Skating Championships was held on February 16, 2020.

== Results ==
The race was started at 14:44. 16 laps were raced with four sprints.

Rank	Name	Country	Time	Points
1st place, gold medalist(s)	Jorrit Bergsma	Netherlands	7:39.49	60
2nd place, silver medalist(s)	Jordan Belchos	Canada	7:39.79	40
3rd place, bronze medalist(s)	Antoine Gélinas-Beaulieu	Canada	7:40.27	24
4	Vitaly Mikhailov	Belarus	7:40.37	14
5	Joey Mantia	United States	7:41.81	6
6	Artur Janicki	Poland	7:45.69	5
7	Haralds Silovs	Latvia	7:48.73	5
8	Chung Jae-won	South Korea	7:41.96	3
9	Ryosuke Tsuchiya	Japan	7:42.06	0
10	Ruslan Zakharov	Russia	7:42.33	0
11	Um Cheon-ho	South Korea	7:42.50	0
12	Ian Quinn	United States	7:42.53	0
13	Livio Wenger	Switzerland	7:43.13	0
14	Timothy Loubineaud	France	7:43.33	0
15	Bart Swings	Belgium	7:45.04	0
16	Andrea Giovannini	Italy	7:45.69	0
17	Hanahati Muhamaiti	China	7:52.48	0
18	Felix Maly	Germany	7:53.15	0
19	Peter Michael	New Zealand	7:53.42	0
20	Alemasi Kahanbai	China	7:55.20	0
21	Armin Hager	Austria	7:55.92	0
22	Danila Semerikov	Russia	8:05.47	0
23	Marcin Bachanek	Poland	8:15.90	0
24	Arjan Stroetinga	Netherlands	6:32.66	0
