= 2018 European Speed Skating Championships =

International speed skating competition

- Venue: Kometa, Kolomna, Russia
- Dates: 5–7 January

The 2018 European Speed Skating Championships were held between 5 and 7 January 2018 at the Kolomna Speed Skating Center in Kolomna, Russia.

== Events ==
For the first time the European Championship is a single distance championship, with the following distances:

- 500m
- 1000m
- 1500m
- 3000m (women)
- 5000m (men)
- Mass start
- Team sprint
- Team pursuit

== Schedule ==
All times are local (UTC+3).

Date	Time	Events
5 January	16:00	500m women 500m men 1500m women 1500m men
6 January	14:45	1000m women 1000m men 3000m women 5000m men
7 January	16:00	Team pursuit women Team pursuit men Team sprint women Team sprint men Mass start women Mass start men

== Medal summary ==
=== Medal table ===
* Host nation (Russia)

Rank	Nation	Gold	Silver	Bronze	Total
1	Netherlands (NED)	6	3	4	13
2	Russia (RUS)*	5	6	3	14
3	Italy (ITA)	2	2	0	4
4	Austria (AUT)	1	1	1	3
5	Finland (FIN)	0	2	0	2
6	Germany (GER)	0	0	2	2
6	Poland (POL)	0	0	2	2
8	Czech Republic (CZE)	0	0	1	1
8	Norway (NOR)	0	0	1	1
Totals (9 entries)		14	14	14	42

=== Men's events ===
Event	Gold		Silver		Bronze	
500 m	Ronald Mulder; Netherlands	34.80	Mika Poutala; Finland	34.854	Pavel Kulizhnikov; Russia	34.858
1000 m	Pavel Kulizhnikov; Russia	1:08.84	Denis Yuskov; Russia	1:08.92	Nico Ihle; Germany	1:08.95
1500 m	Denis Yuskov; Russia	1:44.53	Thomas Krol; Netherlands	1:45.20	Koen Verweij; Netherlands	1:46.40
5000 m	Nicola Tumolero; Italy	6:16.85	Aleksandr Rumyantsev; Russia	6:18.13	Marcel Bosker; Netherlands	6:20.45
Team pursuit	Netherlands; Jan Blokhuijsen; Marcel Bosker; Simon Schouten	3:42.79	Russia; Sergey Gryaztsov; Aleksandr Rumyantsev; Danila Semerikov	3:44.59	Poland; Zbigniew Brodka; Jan Szymański; Adrian Wielgat	3:52.60
Team sprint	Russia; Ruslan Murashov; Pavel Kulizhnikov; Denis Yuskov	1:19.38	Finland; Harri Levo; Pekka Koskela; Mika Poutala	1:21.19	Poland; Artur Nogal; Piotr Michalski; Sebastian Klosinski	1:21.29
Mass start	Jan Blokhuijsen; Netherlands	60 pts	Andrea Giovannini; Italy	41 pts	Ruslan Zakharov; Russia	20 pts

=== Women's events ===
Event	Gold		Silver		Bronze	
500 m	Vanessa Herzog; Austria	37.69	Angelina Golikova; Russia	38.04	Karolína Erbanová; Czech Republic	38.18
1000 m	Yekaterina Shikhova; Russia	1:15.34	Vanessa Herzog; Austria	1:15.44	Marrit Leenstra; Netherlands	1:15.74
1500 m	Lotte van Beek; Netherlands	1:55.52	Yekaterina Shikhova; Russia	1:56.57	Marrit Leenstra; Netherlands	1:56.58
3000 m	Esmee Visser; Netherlands	4:05.31	Carlijn Achtereekte; Netherlands	4:06.81	Natalia Voronina; Russia	4:07.62
Team pursuit	Netherlands; Lotte van Beek; Marrit Leenstra; Melissa Wijfje	2:59.34	Russia; Olga Graf; Yekaterina Shikhova; Natalia Voronina	3:01.88	Germany; Roxanne Dufter; Gabriele Hirschbichler; Michelle Uhrig	3:05.03
Team sprint	Russia; Angelina Golikova; Olga Fatkulina; Elizaveta Kazelina	1:26.71	Netherlands; Mayon Kuipers; Sanneke de Neeling; Letitia de Jong	1:28.65	Norway; Martine Ripsrud; Anne Gulbrandsen; Sofie Karoline Haugen	1:31.88
Mass start	Francesca Lollobrigida; Italy	65 pts	Francesca Bettrone; Italy	43 pts	Vanessa Herzog; Austria	21 pts
