= 2011 World Single Distance Speed Skating Championships – Men's 10,000 metres =

Men's 10,000 metres at the 2011 World Single Distance Speed Skating Championships
- Date: 12 March 2011

Medalists
gold medal	Bob de Jong	Netherlands
silver medal	Bob de Vries	Netherlands
bronze medal	Ivan Skobrev	Russia

The men's 10,000 m race of the 2011 World Single Distance Speed Skating Championships was held on March 12 at 12:55 local time.

== Results ==
Rank	Pair	Lane	Name	Country	Time	Time behind	Notes
1st place, gold medalist(s)	7	o	Bob de Jong	Netherlands	12:48.20		
2nd place, silver medalist(s)	8	i	Bob de Vries	Netherlands	13:04.62	+16.42	
3rd place, bronze medalist(s)	6	i	Ivan Skobrev	Russia	13:08.17	+19.97	
4	7	i	Lee Seung-hoon	South Korea	13:08.83	+20.63	
5	4	i	Shane Dobbin	New Zealand	13:17.56	+29.36	
6	5	o	Dmitry Babenko	Kazakhstan	13:19.59	+31.39	
7	8	o	Håvard Bøkko	Norway	13:22.86	+34.66	
8	4	o	Marco Weber	Germany	13:26.84	+38.64	
9	3	o	Henrik Christiansen	Norway	13:30.94	+42.74	
10	3	i	Jonathan Kuck	United States	13:33.79	+45.59	
11	2	i	Moritz Geisreiter	Germany	13:33.86	+45.66	
12	1	o	Øystein Grødum	Norway	13:39.00	+50.80	
13	2	o	Joshua Lose	Australia	13:39.71	+51.51	
14	5	i	Alexej Baumgärtner	Germany	13:40.74	+52.54	
15	1	i	Aleksandr Rumyantsev	Russia	13:44.32	+56.12	
–	6	o	Arjen van der Kieft	Netherlands		DQ	
