= 2012 World Single Distance Speed Skating Championships – Men's 10,000 metres =

Men's 10,000 metres at the 2012 World Single Distance Speed Skating Championships
- Date: 24 March 2012

Medalists
gold medal	Bob de Jong	Netherlands
silver medal	Jorrit Bergsma	Netherlands
bronze medal	Jonathan Kuck	United States

The Men's 10,000 metres race of the 2012 World Single Distance Speed Skating Championships was held on March 24 at 12:00 local time.

== Results ==
Rank	Pair	Lane	Name	Country	Time	Time Behind	Notes
1st place, gold medalist(s)	8	o	Bob de Jong	Netherlands	12:53.91		
2nd place, silver medalist(s)	7	i	Jorrit Bergsma	Netherlands	12:57.71	+3.80	
3rd place, bronze medalist(s)	5	i	Jonathan Kuck	United States	13:12.66	+18.75	
4	3	o	Moritz Geisreiter	Germany	13:21.10	+27.19	
5	8	i	Håvard Bøkko	Norway	13:23.70	+29.79	
6	7	o	Bob de Vries	Netherlands	13:25.74	+31.83	
7	5	o	Marco Weber	Germany	13:28.44	+34.53	
8	2	o	Shane Dobbin	New Zealand	13:28.84	+34.93	
9	3	i	Alexej Baumgärtner	Germany	13:29.02	+35.11	
10	6	i	Alexis Contin	France	13:29.92	+36.01	
11	4	o	Hiroki Hirako	Japan	13:31.99	+38.08	
12	4	i	Dmitry Babenko	Kazakhstan	13:35.72	+41.81	
13	1	i	Jordan Belchos	Canada	13:36.59	+42.68	
14	2	i	Roger Schneider	Switzerland	13:50.11	+56.20	
	6	o	Bart Swings	Belgium	DNF		
