= 2019 KNSB Dutch Single Distance Championships – Women's 5000 m =

- Venue: Thialf, Heerenveen, Netherlands
- Date: 30 December 2018
- Competitors: 10 skaters

Medalist men
1st place, gold medalist(s)		Esmee Visser	NED
2nd place, silver medalist(s)		Carien Kleibeuker	NED
3rd place, bronze medalist(s)		Carlijn Achtereekte	NED

The women's 5000 meter race at the 2019 KNSB Dutch Single Distance Championships was held at the Thialf ice skating in Heerenveen on 30 December 2018 (Sunday). Despite taking place in 2018, the event was part of the 2018–2019 speed skating season. Ten athletes competed, with Antoinette de Jong entering as the defending champion.

== Result ==
Rank	Skater	Time
1st place, gold medalist(s)	Esmee Visser	6:49.49 PR
2nd place, silver medalist(s)	Carien Kleibeuker	6:53.97
3rd place, bronze medalist(s)	Carlijn Achtereekte	6:56.06
4	Antoinette de Jong	6:59.87
5	Ineke Dedden	7:02.68 PR
6	Reina Anema	7:05.34
7	Melissa Wijfje	7:08.46
8	Roza Blokker	7:13.35
9	Aveline Hijlkema	7:14.23 PR
10	Imke Vormeer	7:19.52
