= 2016–17 ISU Speed Skating World Cup =

2016–2017 series of speed skating competitions

ISU Speed Skating World Cup
- Dates: 11 November 2016 – 11 March 2017

The 2016–17 ISU Speed Skating World Cup, officially the ISU World Cup Speed Skating 2016–2017, was a series of international speed skating competitions that ran the entire season. The season started on 11 November 2016 in Harbin, China, and ended with the final on 11 March 2017 in Stavanger, Norway.

In total, six competition weekends were held at six different locations, 18 cups were contested (nine for men, and nine for women), and 88 races took place. Additionally, there were two Grand World Cups, one for men and one for women, in which all individual races, regardless of distance, counted.

The World Cup is organized by the International Skating Union (ISU).

== Calendar ==
The detailed schedule for the season.

WC #	City	Venue	Date	500 m	1000 m	1500 m	3000 m	5000 m	10000 m	Mass start	Team pursuit	Team sprint
1	Harbin	Heilongjiang Indoor Rink	11–13 November	2m, 2w	m, w	m, w	w	m		m, w	m, w	
2	Nagano	M-Wave	18–20 November	m, w	m, w	m, w	w	m		m, w	m, w	m, w
3	Astana	Alau Ice Palace	2–4 December	2m, 2w	m, w	m, w	w	m		m, w	m, w	
4	Heerenveen	Thialf	9–11 December	m, w	m, w	m, w		w	m	m, w	m, w	m, w
	Heerenveen	Thialf	6–8 January	2017 European Speed Skating Championships								
5	Berlin	Sportforum Hohenschönhausen	27–29 January	2m, 2w	2m, 2w	m, w	w	m				
	Gangneung	Gangneung Oval	9–12 February	2017 World Single Distance Speed Skating Championships								
	Calgary	Olympic Oval	25–26 February	2017 World Sprint Speed Skating Championships								
	Hamar	Vikingskipet	4–5 March	2017 World Allround Speed Skating Championships								
6	TBD	TBD	10–12 March	2m, 2w	m, w	m, w	w	m		m, w	m, w	m, w
Total				10m, 10w	7m, 7w	6m, 6w	5w	5m, 1w	1m	5m, 5w	5m, 5w	3m, 3w

Note: the men's 5000 and 10000 metres were contested as one cup, and the women's 3000 and 5000 metres were contested as one cup, as indicated by the color coding.

In addition, there were two combination cups, the allround combination and the sprint combination. For the allround combination, the distances were 1500 + 5000 metres for men, and 1500 + 3000 metres for women. For the sprint combination, the distances were 500 + 1000 metres, both for men and women. These cups were contested only in World Cup 5, in Berlin, Germany.

== Entry rules ==
=== Qualification criteria ===
In order to qualify, skaters had to achieve the following results in ISU events, international competitions or national championships between 1 July 2015 and the entry deadline for the competition concerned.

Men
Distance	Time required ^{A}	Time required ^{B}
500 m	36.20	36.60
1000 m	1:11.90	1:12.80
1500 m	1:51.00	1:52.50
3000 m	—	—
5000 m	6:48.00	6:52.00
10000 m	13:40.00 ^{C}	13:50.00 ^{D}

Women
Distance	Time required ^{A}	Time required ^{B}
500 m	40.00	40.50
1000 m	1:20.00	1:21.00
1500 m	2:03.00	2:05.00
3000 m	4:24.00	4:28.00
5000 m	7:25.00 ^{E}	7:32.00 ^{F}
10000 m	—	—

^{A} in the Olympic Oval, Calgary, the Utah Olympic Oval, Salt Lake City, or the Xinjiang Ice Sports Center, Ürümqi
^{B} in other ice rinks
^{C} or 6:35.00 on 5000 m
^{D} or 6:40.00 on 5000 m
^{E} or 4:15.00 on 3000 m
^{F} or 4:20.00 on 3000 m

For the mass start and team pursuit events, skaters who had achieved any one of the above results were qualified. However, every ISU member nation was allowed to enter a maximum of one skater per gender who had not achieved any of these results, provided that they had achieved a 1500 m result of 1:57.50 (men) or 2:10.00 (women).

=== Nation quotas ===
Every ISU member nation was allowed to enter at least one competitor for each distance, subject to the qualification criteria above. Additionally, countries placed among the top 40 in the final 2015–16 World Cup were allowed an additional entry per top 40 (though 5 riders in the top 40 were required to have the full quotum of 5). The maximum quota was 5 skaters. A member nation organizing a World Cup competition was granted the maximum quota in all events. Member nations not mentioned were allowed to enter a maximum of one skater for each distance.

For the mass start event, a member nation was allowed to enter a maximum of two skaters, all subject to the qualifying criteria above. For the team pursuit and team sprint events, a member nation was allowed to enter one team only per category (men/women).

The World Cup competitions 1–4 served as qualifying events for the 2017 European Championships and 2017 World Single Distance Championships. World Cup 5 served as a qualifying event for the 2017 World Allround Championships and 2017 World Sprint Championships. Results from World Cups 1–5 defined the seeding for the Single Distance Championships. World Cup 5 had extended entry quotas due to its status as qualifying event; each ISU member nation got one more quota place than its highest quota of either of the two distances in the competition, however, the maximum quota was still 5 places.

== Competition format ==
=== Seeding of skaters ===
If the number of entered skaters exceeded a certain limit, skaters competed in two separate divisions, A and B. In the first competition, the composition of skaters in the respective division was determined by the ranking of the skaters in the respective distance category from the 2015–16 World Cup and the seeding submitted by the respective team leaders before the draw. For each country and distance category, the number of skaters in the ranking top of the previous year decided the number of places available in Division A, but the team leader's seeding decided which skater goes into which division.

In the following competitions, the current World Cup ranking was used, with special considerations to top-placed skaters in Division B of the previous competition. A skater was also under certain conditions allowed to apply for a wild card for Division A, but only the first time the skater participated in a distance category, and not in the first and last competitions of the season. In the last competition for the season, there was no Division B.

Number of competitors in Division A
	World Cup 1–5 number of entries				World Cup 6
Distance	up to 20	21 to 24	25 to 28	29 or more	
500 m 1000 m 1500 m	all	all	all	20	20
5000 m men 3000 m women	all	12	16	16	16
10000 m men 5000 m women	12	12	12	12	—
Mass start	all	all	16	20	20

=== Points system ===
==== Points tables ====
World Cup points for all competitions, except the last, were awarded in both divisions, using two sets of tables, A1/B1 and A2/B2. Tables A1 and B1 were used when the number of competitors in Division A exceeded 16, while tables A2 and B2 were used when that number was between 12 and 16. However, if table B1 was used for Division B in the first race in an event that is raced twice in the same competition, it was used also in the second race, regardless of the number of competitors in Division A.

For the last competition, since there was no Division B, points were awarded using table A3.

Points system, tables A1/B1 (more than 16 entries in A)
Rank	Division A	Division B
1	100	25
2	80	19
3	70	15
4	60	11
5	50	8
6	45	6
7	40	4
8	36	2
9	32	1
10	28	—
11	24	
12	21	
13	18	
14	16	
15	14	
16	12	
17	10	
18	8	
19	6	
20	5	
21	4	
22	3	
23	2	
24	1	

Points system, tables A2/B2 (12–16 entries in A)
Rank	Division A	Division B
1	100	32
2	80	27
3	70	23
4	60	19
5	50	15
6	45	11
7	40	9
8	35	7
9	30	6
10	25	5
11	21	4
12	18	3
13	16	2
14	14	1
15	12	—
16	10	

Points system, table A3
Rank	Division A
1	150
2	120
3	105
4	90
5	75
6	45
7	40
8	36
9	32
10	28
11	24
12	21
13	18
14	16
15	14
16	12
17	10
18	8
19	6
20	5

==== Mass start ranking ====
The mass start races were over 20 laps for men and 15 laps for women. There were three intermediate sprints, at 5, 10 and 15 laps for men, and at 4, 8 and 12 laps for women. Race points were awarded to the four first skaters at the intermediate sprints, and to the six first skaters at the final sprint. The accumulated points a skater collected during a race decided the final ranking. For skaters who were tied in race points, including those who had failed to collect any, their finishing order broke the tie.

Points table for mass start
Rank	Intermediate sprints	Final sprint (finish)
1	5	31
2	3	15
3	2	10
4	1	5
5	—	3
6		1

==== Grand World Cup ====
In order to determine an overall World Cup winner, one for men and one for women, a special points system was used, awarding points for the top five skaters in each individual event.

Points table for Grand World Cup
Rank	World Cup 1–5	World Cup 6
1	10	15
2	8	12
3	7	10,5
4	6	9
5	5	7,5

Note: half points were awarded in distances that were skated twice in the same competition.

=== Prize money ===
Prize money for each competition
Rank	Individual events	Mass start	Team pursuit
1	$1500	$750	$2100
2	$1000	$500	$1500
3	$800	$400	$1200

Note: half amounts were awarded in distances that were skated twice in the same competition.

Prize money for final ranking
Rank	Individual events	Mass start	Team pursuit
1	$15000	$5000	$5000
2	$10000	$3000	$3000
3	$7000	$2500	$2500
4	$5000	$2000	$2000
5	$4000	$1500	$1500
6	$3500	—	—
7	$3000		
8	$2500		
9	$2000		
10	$1500		

Additionally, the Grand World Cup winner of each category (men/women) was awarded $20000.

== World records ==
World records going into the 2016–17 season.

=== Men ===
Distance	Time	Holder(s)	Nat.	Date	Venue	Reference
500 m	33.98	Pavel Kulizhnikov	(Russia)	20 November 2015	Utah Olympic Oval, Salt Lake City	
1000 m	1:06.42	Shani Davis	(United States)	7 March 2009	Utah Olympic Oval, Salt Lake City	
1500 m	1:41.04	Shani Davis	(United States)	11 December 2009	Utah Olympic Oval, Salt Lake City	
5000 m	6:03.32	Sven Kramer	(Netherlands)	17 November 2007	Olympic Oval, Calgary	
10000 m	12:36.30	Ted-Jan Bloemen	(Canada)	21 November 2015	Utah Olympic Oval, Salt Lake City	
Team pursuit (8 laps)	3:35.60	Koen Verweij; Jan Blokhuijsen; Sven Kramer	(Netherlands)	16 November 2013	Utah Olympic Oval, Salt Lake City	

=== Women ===
Distance	Time	Holder(s)	Nat.	Date	Venue	Reference
500 m	36.36	Lee Sang-hwa	(South Korea)	16 November 2013	Utah Olympic Oval, Salt Lake City	
1000 m	1:12.18	Brittany Bowe	(United States)	22 November 2015	Utah Olympic Oval, Salt Lake City	
1500 m	1:50.85	Heather Richardson-Bergsma	(United States)	21 November 2015	Utah Olympic Oval, Salt Lake City	
3000 m	3:53.34	Cindy Klassen	(Canada)	18 March 2006	Olympic Oval, Calgary	
5000 m	6:42.66	Martina Sáblíková	(Czech Republic)	18 February 2011	Utah Olympic Oval, Salt Lake City	
Team pursuit (6 laps)	2:55.79	Kristina Groves; Christine Nesbitt; Brittany Schussler	(Canada)	6 December 2009	Olympic Oval, Calgary	

- New records :

== Men's standings ==
=== 500 m ===
Rank	Name	Points
1	(Netherlands) Dai Dai Ntab	585
2	(Russia) Ruslan Murashov	557
3	(Netherlands) Ronald Mulder	541

=== 1000 m ===
Rank	Name	Points
1	(Netherlands) Kjeld Nuis	550
2	(Canada) Vincent De Haitre	440
3	(Netherlands) Kai Verbij	394

=== 1500 m ===
Rank	Name	Points
1	(Netherlands) Kjeld Nuis	455
2	(Russia) Denis Yuskov	430
3	(Netherlands) Patrick Roest	345

=== 5000 and 10000 m ===
Rank	Name	Points
1	(Netherlands) Jorrit Bergsma	480
2	(Canada) Ted-Jan Bloemen	413
3	(New Zealand) Peter Michael	338

=== Mass start ===
Rank	Name	Points
1	(South Korea) Seung-Hoon Lee	412
2	(Italy) Andrea Giovannini	280
3	(Netherlands) Jorrit Bergsma	270

=== Team pursuit ===
Rank	Name	Points
1	Netherlands	430
2	Norway	390
3	Japan	374

=== Team sprint ===
Rank	Name	Points
1	Canada	300
2	Netherlands	260
3	Germany	234

=== Grand World Cup ===
Rank	Name	Points
1	(Netherlands) Kjeld Nuis	930
2	(Netherlands) Jorrit Bergsma	700
3	(Netherlands) Kai Verbij	507

== Women's standings ==
=== 500 m ===
Rank	Name	Points
1	(Japan) Nao Kodaira	900
2	(Japan) Maki Tsuji	585
3	(Japan) Erina Kamiya	527

=== 1000 m ===
Rank	Name	Points
1	(United States) Heather Bergsma	650
2	(Japan) Miho Takagi	476
3	(Netherlands) Marrit Leenstra	451

=== 1500 m ===
Rank	Name	Points
1	(United States) Heather Bergsma	480
2	(Netherlands) Marrit Leenstra	460
3	(Japan) Miho Takagi	430

=== 3000 and 5000 m ===
Rank	Name	Points
1	(Czech Republic) Martina Sáblíková	630
2	(Russia) Anna Yurakova	395
3	(Netherlands) Antoinette de Jong	360

=== Mass start ===
Rank	Name	Points
1	(South Korea) Bo-Reum Kim	460
2	(Italy) Francesca Lollobrigida	364
3	(Canada) Ivanie Blondin	344

=== Team pursuit ===
Rank	Name	Points
1	Japan	430
2	Netherlands	430
3	Russia	384

=== Team sprint ===
Rank	Name	Points
1	Japan	320
2	Netherlands	290
3	Russia	160

=== Grand World Cup ===
Rank	Name	Points
1	(United States) Heather Bergsma	1217
2	(Japan) Miho Takagi	960
3	(Czech Republic) Martina Sáblíková	864
