= Simon Schouten =

Dutch speed skater

Personal information
- Born: 7 December 1990 (age 35) Andijk, Netherlands

Sport
- Country: Netherlands
- Sport: Speed skating
- Retired: 2019
Medal record
European Single Distance Championships
Gold medal – first place	2018 Kolomna	Team pursuit

Simon Schouten (born 7 December 1990) is a retired Dutch long track speed skater who specializes in the longer distances and the marathon.

He won a gold medal at the 2018 European Speed Skating Championships in Kolomna, Russia in the team pursuit event with Jan Blokhuijsen and Marcel Bosker.

At the 2018–19 ISU Speed Skating World Cup – World Cup 1 he finished second in the mass start event behind Andrea Giovannini.

He is the older brother of speed skater Irene Schouten.

== Personal records ==
Personal records
Men's speed skating
Event	Result	Date	Location	Notes
500 m	38:33	12 February 2010	Enschede	
1000 m	1.15.21	24 February 2009	Thialf, Heerenveen	
1500 m	1:48.63	15 October 2017	Eisstadion Inzell, Inzell	
3000 m	3:46.80	19 December 2017	Thialf, Heerenveen	
5000 m	6:16.67	10 December 2017	Utah Olympic Oval, Salt Lake City	
10000 m	13:03.86	4 November 2018	Thialf, Heerenveen	

He is currently in 92nd position in the adelskalender with 148.032 points.
