= Marcel Bosker =

Dutch speed skater (born 1997)

Personal information
- Nationality: Dutch
- Born: 19 January 1997 (age 29) Schöftland, Switzerland

Sport
- Country: Netherlands
- Sport: Speed skating
- Event: 5000 m
- Club: TalentNED
- Turned pro: 2018
Medal record
Men's speed skating
Representing the Netherlands
World Single Distances Championships
Gold medal – first place	2019 Inzell	Team pursuit
Gold medal – first place	2020 Salt Lake City	Team pursuit
Gold medal – first place	2021 Heerenveen	Team pursuit
Gold medal – first place	2023 Heerenveen	Team pursuit
Bronze medal – third place	2025 Hamar	Team pursuit
World Allround Championships
Bronze medal – third place	2018 Amsterdam	Allround
European Championships
Gold medal – first place	2018 Kolomna	Team pursuit
Gold medal – first place	2020 Heerenveen	Team pursuit
Gold medal – first place	2022 Heerenveen	Team pursuit
Silver medal – second place	2021 Heerenveen	Allround
Bronze medal – third place	2018 Kolomna	5000 m
Bronze medal – third place	2024 Heerenveen	Team pursuit

Marcel Bosker (born 19 January 1997) is a Dutch long track speed skater.

He won the allround bronze medal at the 2018 World Allround Speed Skating Championships in Amsterdam.

== Biography ==
Bosker is the son of parents with a skating career. His mother Henriët Bosker-van der Meer (1967) was Dutch all-round champion in 1989. Father Ronald Bosker also participated in the Dutch championships and finished seventh that same year. After immigrating to Switzerland, both his parents represented Switzerland during the 2003/2004 season onwards. Bosker was born in Switzerland. At the age of 14 he moved to the Netherlands without his parents and stayed with a host family so that he could develop his potential in speed skating.

== Records ==
=== Personal records ===
Personal records
Speed skating
Event	Result	Date	Location	Notes
500 meter	36.39	18 March 2017	Calgary	
1000 meter	1:09.10	16 March 2017	Calgary	
1500 meter	1:44.12	7 February 2020	Calgary	
3000 meter	3:36.33	25 November 2017	Calgary	
5000 meter	6:08.90	9 March 2019	Salt Lake City	
10000 meter	12:43.14	2 November 2025	Heerenveen	

At the end of the 2020–2021 speed skating season Bosker occupied the 18th position on the adelskalender with a score of 146.948 points

=== World record ===
Nr.	Event	Result	Date	Location	Notes
1.	Team pursuit	3:34.68	15 February 2020	Salt Lake City	With Sven Kramer and Douwe de Vries

== Tournament overview ==
Season	Dutch Championships Single Distances	Dutch Championships Allround	World Championships Allround	World Cup GWC	World Championships Single Distances	World Championships Junior	European Championships Single Distances	European Championships Allround	Olympic Games
2014–15	HEERENVEEN 15th 1500m	HEERENVEEN 6th 500m 16th 5000m 15th 1500m DNQ 10000m 17th overall				WARSAW 23rd 500m 5th 1500m 12th 1000m 4th 5000m (bronze) overall (silver) mass start			
2015–16	HEERENVEEN DNF 1500m 14th 5000m 15th mass start	HEERENVEEN 8th 500m 9th 5000m 4th 1500m 8th 10000m 7th overall				CHANGCHUN 30th 500m (bronze) 1500m 13th 1000m 4th 5000m (bronze) overall 24th mass start 4th team pursuit			
2016–17	HEERENVEEN 21st 1000m 8th 1500m 6th 5000m 12th 10000m 17th mass start	HEERENVEEN 7th 500m (silver) 5000m (bronze) 1500m 4th 10000m (bronze) overall		29th 1500m 25th 5000/10000m 82nd GWC					
2017–18	HEERENVEEN 5th 1500m 8th 5000m 9th 10000m	HEERENVEEN (silver) 500m (gold) 5000m (gold) 1500m (gold) 10000m (gold) overall	AMSTERDAM 12th 500m (bronze) 5000m 7th 1500m (bronze) 10000m (bronze) overall	11th 1500m 11th 5000/10000m 23rd GWC			KOLOMNA 4th 1500m (bronze) 5000m (gold) team pursuit		
2018–19	HEERENVEEN 7th 1500m 5th 5000m NC 10000m	HEERENVEEN 5th 500m (silver) 5000m (silver) 1500m (silver) 10000m (silver) overall		16th 1500m (silver) 5000/10000m 4th team pursuit 33rd GWC	INZELL (gold) team pursuit				
2019–20	HEERENVEEN 6th 1500m 4th 5000m DNF 10000m 4th mass start	HEERENVEEN 5th 500m (silver) 5000m (silver) 1500m (bronze) 10000m (silver) overall		7th 1500m 12th 5000/10000m 5th team pursuit 24th GWC	SALT LAKE CITY (gold) team pursuit		HEERENVEEN (gold) team pursuit		
2020–21	HEERENVEEN 7th 1500m (bronze) 5000m (bronze) 10000m	HEERENVEEN 5th 500m (bronze) 5000m (silver) 1500m (bronze) 10000m (silver) overall		13th 5000m (silver) team pursuit	HEERENVEEN (gold) team pursuit			HEERENVEEN 7th 500m (bronze) 5000m 4h 1500m 4th 10000m (silver) overall	
2021–22	HEERENVEEN 7th 1500m 4th 5000m 4th 10000m 25th mass start	HEERENVEEN 5th 500m (gold) 5000m (gold) 1500m (bronze) 10000m (gold) overall	HAMAR 13th 500m 7th 5000m 5th 1500m DNS 10000m NC10 overall	37th 1500m 11th 5000/10000m 4th team pursuit			HEERENVEEN (gold) team pursuit 17th mass start		BEIJGING 9th 1500m 4th team pursuit
2022–23	HEERENVEEN 5th 1500m (silver) 5000m DQ mass start	HEERENVEEN 5th 500m 4th 5000m (bronze) 1500m 4th 10000m (bronze) overall		36th 1500m 15th 5000/10000m (bronze) team pursuit	HEERENVEEN 5th 5000m (gold) team pursuit			HAMAR 6th 500m 6th 5000m 5th 1500m 7th 10000m 7th overall	

== World Cup overview ==
Season	1500 meter					
2016–2017	–	–	–	–	1st(b)	–
2017–2018	14th	14th	5th(b)	3rd(b)	3rd place, bronze medalist(s)	8th
2018–2019	–	2nd(b)	11th	3rd(b)	4th	–
2019–2020	8th	14th	7th	5th	6th	
2020–2021						
2021–2022	–	–	–	14th	–	
2022–2023	–	–	10th(b)	–	2nd(b)	

Season	5000/10000 meter					
2016–2017	–	–	–	–	1st(b)	—
2017–2018	–	–	–	2nd(b)	8th	3rd place, bronze medalist(s)
2018–2019	3rd place, bronze medalist(s)	12th	(gold) *	9th	4th	2nd place, silver medalist(s)
2019–2020	1st(b)	4th	12th*	–	4th(b)	7th
2020–2021	2nd place, silver medalist(s)	9th				
2021–2022	3rd(b)	7th*(b)	DNF(b)	1st(b)	8th	
2022–2023	4th	8th	9th	–	6th	–

Season	Team pursuit			
2016–2017				
2017–2018	–	1st place, gold medalist(s)	10th	–
2018–2019	2nd place, silver medalist(s)	1st place, gold medalist(s)	–	
2019–2020	1st place, gold medalist(s)	–	–	
2020–2021	–	4th		
2021–2022	1st place, gold medalist(s)	6th	7th	
2022–2023	2nd place, silver medalist(s)	–	3rd place, bronze medalist(s)	

DNF = Did not finish
DNQ = Did not qualify
– = Did not participate
(b) = Division B
* = 10.000 meter
GWC = Grand World Cup

== Medals won ==
Championship	Gold (gold)	Silver (silver)	Bronze (bronze)
Dutch Single distances	0	0	2
Dutch Allround	4	11	5
World Allround	0	0	3
World Single Distances	3	0	0
European Single Distances	3	0	1
European Allround	0	1	1
World Cup	4	5	3
World Junior	0	1	3
