= Bart de Vries =

Dutch actor (1964–2022)

- Born: 29 December 1964; Rotterdam, Netherlands
- Died: 6 December 2022 (aged 57)
- Occupation: Actor

Bart de Vries (29 December 1964 – 6 December 2022) was a Dutch stage and television actor.

== Biography ==
De Vries was born in Rotterdam in 1964. He was the son of actor Rob de Vries and the brother of actor Edwin de Vries. He was married to actress Lidewij Benus.

Bart de Vries attended acting workshops with Jules Croiset and Ton Lutz. As stage actor De Vries played in the musical of Soldier of Orange and 3 Musketiers. He also directed plays. As a television actor he was in many television series including: Baantjer, Flikken Maastricht, Meiden van De Wit and Van God Los.

Terminally ill, De Vries died from complications of COVID-19 on 6 December 2022, at the age of 57.
