= Jorrit Bergsma =

Dutch speed skater (born 1986)

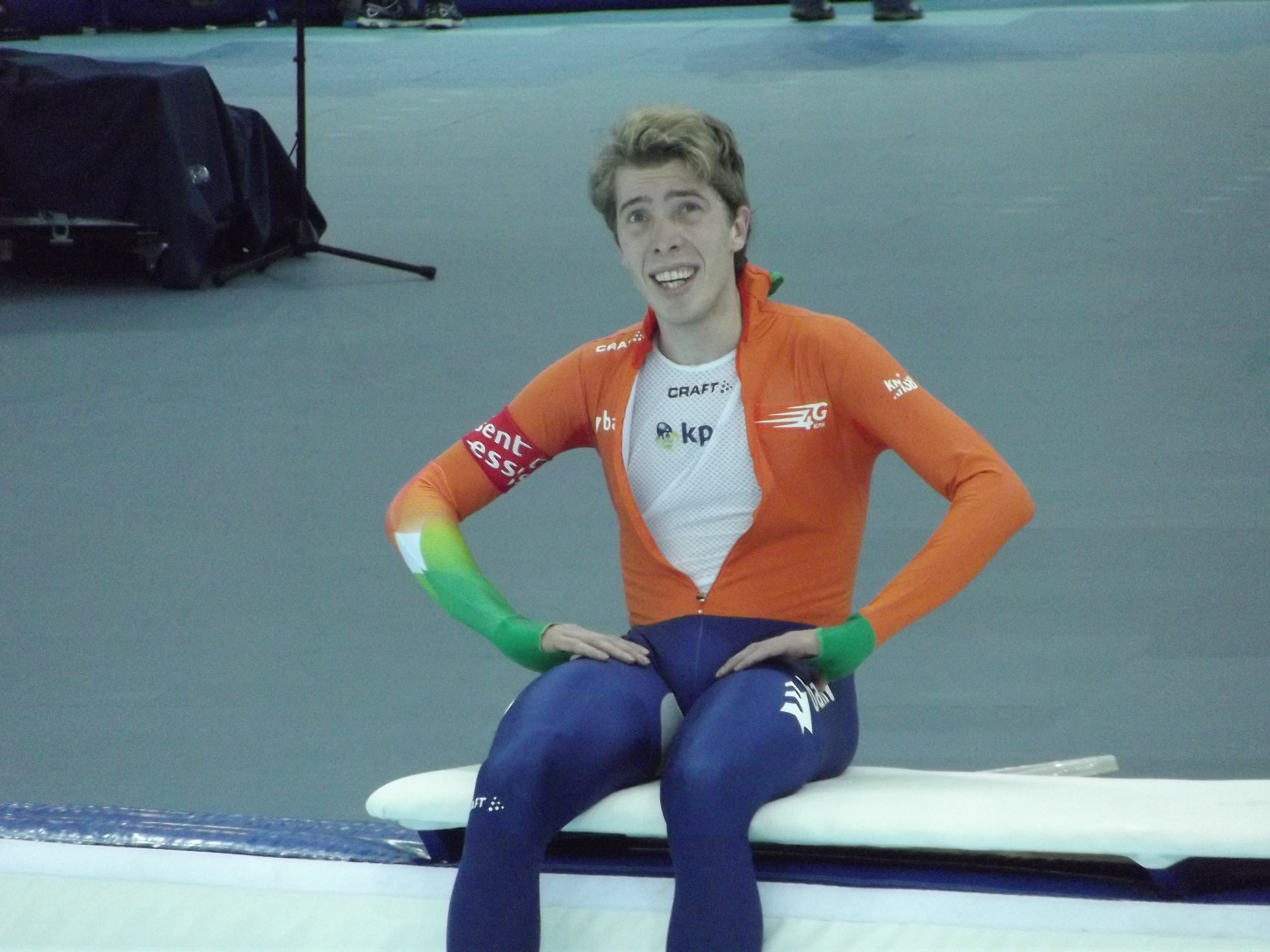
- Jorrit Bergsma at the 2013 World Single Distance Speed Skating Championships

Personal information
- Nationality: Dutch
- Born: 1 February 1986 (age 40) Oldeboorn, Netherlands
- Height: 1.90 m (6 ft 3 in)
- Weight: 73 kg (161 lb)
- Spouse: Heather Richardson

Sport
- Country: Netherlands
- Sport: Speed skating
- Events: 5000 m, 10000 m, mass start
- Club: Team AH Zaanlander
- Turned pro: 2004
- Coached by: Jillert Anema
Medal record
Men's speed skating
Representing the Netherlands
Olympic Games
Gold medal – first place	2014 Sochi	10000 m
Gold medal – first place	2026 Milano Cortina	Mass start
Silver medal – second place	2018 Pyeongchang	10000 m
Bronze medal – third place	2014 Sochi	5000 m
Bronze medal – third place	2026 Milano Cortina	10000 m
World Single Distances Championships
Gold medal – first place	2013 Sochi	10000 m
Gold medal – first place	2015 Heerenveen	10000 m
Gold medal – first place	2017 Gangneung	Team pursuit
Gold medal – first place	2019 Inzell	10000 m
Gold medal – first place	2020 Salt Lake City	Mass start
Silver medal – second place	2012 Heerenveen	10000 m
Silver medal – second place	2013 Sochi	5000 m
Silver medal – second place	2015 Heerenveen	5000 m
Silver medal – second place	2016 Kolomna	5000 m
Silver medal – second place	2017 Gangneung	5000 m
Silver medal – second place	2017 Gangneung	10000 m
Silver medal – second place	2021 Heerenveen	10000 m
Silver medal – second place	2023 Heerenveen	10000 m
European Championships
Silver medal – second place	2022 Heerenveen	5000 m

Jacob Jorrit Bergsma (Dutch pronunciation: [ˈjɔrɪd ˈbɛr(ə)xsmaː]; born 1 February 1986) is a Dutch speed skater and marathon skater. He won the gold medal in the 10,000 m at the 2014 Winter Olympics, and the gold medal in the mass start at the 2026 Winter Olympics. His coach is Jillert Anema.

== Biography ==
Bergsma has been skating for the BAM team since the 2010–11 season. On 10 October 2009 he won his first skating match (the Marathon), the DSB Bank Cup. During the 2009–10 season, he tried to qualify for the Olympic Games for Kazakhstan. During the national championships in the Russian Chelyabinsk, Bergsma won the 5000 m in 6:28.21 and qualified for the World Cup. The ISU refused to let the Dutch Kazakh start, and Bergsma decided to end his Kazakh adventure. Later in the season he won the Alternatieve Elfstedentocht in Austria.

Bergsma won the Dutch Marathon Championships on 10 February 2010 by beating Douwe de Vries. On 29 December 2010, he won the Ronde van Duurswold, the first edition of this classic on natural ice. In 2012 he won the Dutch Marathon Championships on natural ice for the second time.

He became the Dutch 5000 m champion at the Dutch Single Distance Championships in November 2011. At the first World Cup in Chelyabinsk, he won the 5000 m in a new rink record (6:18.74)

At the 2014 Winter Olympics, Bergsma won gold in the 10,000 m with an Olympic record of 12:44.45. Bergsma also won bronze in the 5000 m.

At the 2018 Winter Olympics, Bergsma won silver in the 10,000 m.

At the 2026 Winter Olympics, Bergsma won bronze in the 10,000 m and gold in the mass start, becoming the oldest-ever Olympic speed skating medallist at age 40.

== Personal life ==
Bergsma is married to American speed skater Heather Bergsma.

== Records ==
Personal records
Men's speed skating
Event	Result	Date	Location	Notes
500 meter	38.25	27 December 2014	Heerenveen	
1000 meter	1:14.30	20 December 2014	Heerenveen	
1500 meter	1:47.08	2 November 2013	Calgary	
3000 meter	3:39.79	3 November 2013	Calgary	
5000 meter	6:06.93	10 November 2013	Calgary	
10000 meter	12:39.67	31 October 2021	Heerenveen	

== Tournament overview ==
Season	Dutch Championships Single Distances	Dutch Championships Allround	World Championships Single Distances	Olympic Games	World Cup GWC	European Championships Single Distances
2010–11	HEERENVEEN (bronze) 5000m (bronze) 10000m				7th 5000/10000m	
2011–12	HEERENVEEN (gold) 5000m (silver) 10000m		HEERENVEEN (silver) 10000m		(bronze) 5000/10000m (silver) mass start 5th Grand World Cup	
2012–13	HEERENVEEN (bronze) 5000m (gold) 10000m		SOCHI (silver) 5000m (gold) 10000m		(gold) 5000/10000m (gold) team pursuit 5th mass start (gold) Grand World Cup	
2013–14	HEERENVEEN (silver) 5000m (silver) 10000m 9th mass start			SOCHI (bronze) 5000m (gold) 10000m	(gold) 5000/10000m (gold) team pursuit (bronze) Grand World Cup	
2014–15	HEERENVEEN (silver) 5000m (gold) 10000m 19th mass start	HEERENVEEN 19th 500m (gold) 5000m 4th 1500m (gold) 10000m 4th overall	HEERENVEEN (silver) 5000m (gold) 10000m 19th mass start		45th 1500m (gold) 5000/10000m 4th mass start 5th Grand World Cup	
2015–16	HEERENVEEN 13th 1500m (silver) 5000m DQ 10000m		KOLOMNA (silver) 5000m 21st mass start		(silver) 5000/10000m 4th mass start (gold) team pursuit	
2016–17	HEERENVEEN (silver) 5000m (gold) 10000m		GANGNEUNG (silver) 5000m (silver) 10000m (gold) team pursuit 14th mass start		(gold) 5000/10000m (bronze) mass start (gold) team pursuit	
2017–18	HEERENVEEN (silver) 5000m (gold) 10000m			GANGNEUNG (silver) 10000m	21st mass start 7th team pursuit	
2018–19	HEERENVEEN (silver) 5000m (gold) 10000m 18th mass start		INZELL 12th 5000m (gold) 10000m		22nd 5000/10000m 4th team pursuit	
2019–20	HEERENVEEN (bronze) 5000m (gold) 10000m 12th mass start		SALT LAKE CITY 8th 5000m 4th 10000m (gold) mass start		6th 5000/10000m 7th mass start	HEERENVEEN 4th 5000m 19th mass start
2020–21	HEERENVEEN 4th 5000m DQ 10000m		HEERENVEEN 5th 5000m (silver) 10000m 7th mass start		6th 5000/10000m (bronze) mass start	
2021–22	HEERENVEEN (gold) 5000m (gold) 10000m 17th mass start			BEIJING 5th 5000m 4th 10000m 9th mass start	5th 5000/10000m 5th mass start	HEERENVEEN (silver) 5000m 6th mass start
2022–23	HEERENVEEN (bronze) 5000m (silver) 10000m (gold) mass start		HEERENVEEN 4th 5000m (silver) 10000m 5th mass start		19th 5000/10000m 28th mass start	
2025–2026				MILAN (gold) mass start (bronze) 10000m		

== World Cup overview ==
Season	1500 meter					
2010–2011						
2011–2012						
2012–2013						
2013–2014						
2014–2015	–	–	–	–	16th(b)	–
2015–2016						
2016–2017						
2017–2018						
2018–2019						
2019–2020						
2020–2021						
2021–2022						
2022–2023						

Season	5000/10000 meter					
2010–2011	9th	9th	(bronze) *	–	12th*	5th
2011–2012	1st place, gold medalist(s)	2nd place, silver medalist(s)	(gold) *	–	(silver) *	5th
2012–2013	2nd place, silver medalist(s)	3rd place, bronze medalist(s)	(gold) *	3rd place, bronze medalist(s)	(silver) *	2nd place, silver medalist(s)
2013–2014	2nd place, silver medalist(s)	3rd place, bronze medalist(s)	–*	1st place, gold medalist(s)	1st place, gold medalist(s)	1st place, gold medalist(s)
2014–2015	–	–*	1st place, gold medalist(s)	2nd place, silver medalist(s)	1st place, gold medalist(s)	1st place, gold medalist(s)
2015–2016	2nd place, silver medalist(s)	(bronze) *	1st place, gold medalist(s)	2nd place, silver medalist(s)	2nd place, silver medalist(s)	2nd place, silver medalist(s)
2016–2017	2nd place, silver medalist(s)	2nd place, silver medalist(s)	–	(gold) *	3rd place, bronze medalist(s)	1st place, gold medalist(s)
2017–2018	7th	4th*	16th	–	–	–
2018–2019	–	–	1st(b)*	5th	–	–
2019–2020	2nd place, silver medalist(s)	6th	5th	–	6th	5th
2020–2021	5th	6th				
2021–2022	4th	2nd place, silver medalist(s)	6th	–	6th	
2022–2023	–	12th	2nd(b)	2nd(b)	–	2nd(b)

Season	Team pursuit				
2010–2011					
2011–2012					
2012–2013	–	1st place, gold medalist(s)	1st place, gold medalist(s)	–	
2013–2014	–	–	1st place, gold medalist(s)		−
2014–2015					
2015–2016	–	1st place, gold medalist(s)	−	−	
2016–2017	1st place, gold medalist(s)	1st place, gold medalist(s)	–	2nd place, silver medalist(s)	1st place, gold medalist(s)
2017–2018	10th	–	–	−	
2018–2019	–	–	8th		
2019–2020					
2020–2021					
2021–2022					
2022–2023					

Season	Mass start						
2010–2011							
2011–2012	5th	3rd place, bronze medalist(s)	1st place, gold medalist(s)				
2012–2013	6th	1st place, gold medalist(s)	5th	DQ			
2013–2014							
2014–2015	–	–	4th	1st place, gold medalist(s)	DNF	2nd place, silver medalist(s)	
2015–2016	7th	2nd place, silver medalist(s)	8th	4th			
2016–2017	13th	1st place, gold medalist(s)	−	9th	2nd place, silver medalist(s)		
2017–2018	9th	−	−				
2018–2019							
2019–2020	6th(SF)	1st place, gold medalist(s)	11th	2nd place, silver medalist(s)	−	−	10th
2020–2021	4th(SF)	9th	4th(SF)	1st place, gold medalist(s)			
2021–2022	4th(SF)	8th	5th(SF)	6th	−	−	3rd place, bronze medalist(s)
2022–2023	–	6th	−	−	14th	–	

- * = 10000 meter

== Medals won ==
Championship	Gold (gold)	Silver (silver)	Bronze (bronze)
Dutch Single Distances	9	8	4
World Single Distances	5	7	0
Olympic Games	2	1	2
World Cup	25	18	7
World Cup classification	9	2	4
European Single Distances	0	1	0

Olympic Games
Preceded by Kimberley Bos; Jens van 't Wout	Flag bearer for the Netherlands; 2026 closing ceremony With: Xandra Velzeboer	Most recent
