= Marwin Talsma =

Dutch long track speed skater

Personal information
- Nationality: Dutch
- Born: 19 December 1997 (age 28) Sneek, Netherlands
- Height: 1.85 m (6 ft 1 in)
- Weight: 78 kg (172 lb)

Sport
- Country: Netherlands
- Sport: Speed skating
- Event(s): 5000 meter, 10000 meter
- Club: Team Zaanlander

Marwin Talsma (born 19 December 1997) is a Dutch long track speed skater who specializes in the 5000 and 10000 meter.

He made his international championship debut at the 2021 European Speed Skating Championships in Heerenveen. He is a member of Team Zaanlander.

== Records ==
=== Personal records ===
Personal records
Speed skating
Event	Result	Date	Location	Notes
500 meter	37.96	16 January 2021	Heerenveen	
1000 meter	1:14.40	16 March 2017	Calgary	
1500 meter	1:46.20	27 December 2020	Heerenveen	
3000 meter	3:40.24	19 December 2020	Heerenveen	
5000 meter	6:11.84	31 January 2025	Milwaukee	
10000 meter	12:52.09	1 November 2020	Heerenveen	

Talmsa occupies the 55th position on the adelskalender with a score of 149.389 points
