= Chris Huizinga =

Dutch speed skater (born 1997)

Personal information
- Born: 11 August 1997 (age 28) Groningen, Netherlands
- Height: 1.77 m (5 ft 10 in)
- Weight: 73 kg (161 lb)

Sport
- Country: Netherlands
- Sport: Speed skating
- Event(s): 5000 m, 10000 m
Medal record
Men's Speed skating
Representing Netherlands
World Single Distances Championships
Bronze medal – third place	2025 Hamar	Team pursuit
European Championships
Bronze medal – third place	2024 Heerenveen	Team pursuit

Chris Huizinga (born 11 August 1997) is a Dutch speed skater.

== Career ==
In January 2024, Huizinga competed at the 2024 European Speed Skating Championships and won a bronze medal in the team pursuit with a time of 3:41.36. He won the 2024 KNSB Dutch Allround Championshipship.

In January 2025, he competed at the 2025 European Speed Skating Championships, and was disqualified after two false starts during the 500 metres. On 1 March 2025, he won gold in the 5000 metres during World Cup #6 of the 2024–25 ISU Speed Skating World Cup. Two weeks later he competed at the 2025 World Single Distances Speed Skating Championships and won a bronze medal in the team pursuit, with a time of 3:41.91.
