= 2016 World Allround Speed Skating Championships – Men =

Men's at the 2016 World Allround Speed Skating Championships
- Venue: Sportforum Hohenschönhausen, Berlin
- Date: 5–6 March
- Competitors: 24 from 13 nations
- Winning points: 148.995

Medalists
gold medal	Sven Kramer	Netherlands
silver medal	Sverre Lunde Pedersen	Norway
bronze medal	Jan Blokhuijsen	Netherlands

The men's event of the 2016 World Allround Speed Skating Championships was held on 5 and 6 March 2016.

== Results ==
=== 500 m ===
The race was started on 5 March 2016 at 12:30.

Rank	Pair	Lane	Name	Country	Time	Diff
1	11	i	Denis Yuskov	RUS	35.84	
2	12	i	Håvard Bøkko	NOR	36.18	+0.34
3	11	o	Konrad Niedźwiedzki	POL	36.24	+0.40
4	8	o	Haralds Silovs	LAT	36.31	+0.47
5	10	i	Simen Spieler Nilsen	NOR	36.44	+0.60
6	9	i	Jan Blokhuijsen	NED	36.46	+0.62
7	10	o	Shota Nakamura	JPN	36.49	+0.65
8	2	o	Liu Yiming	CHN	36.52	+0.68
9	7	i	Sven Kramer	NED	36.54	+0.70
10	12	o	Jan Szymański	POL	36.57	+0.73
11	6	o	Bart Swings	BEL	36.67	+0.83
12	3	o	Andrea Giovannini	ITA	36.79	+0.95
12	9	o	Sverre Lunde Pedersen	NOR	36.79	+0.95
14	8	i	Sergey Trofimov	RUS	36.85	+1.01
15	7	o	Zbigniew Bródka	POL	36.92	+1.08
16	5	o	Vitaly Mikhailov	BLR	36.93	+1.09
17	6	i	Shane Williamson	JPN	36.94	+1.10
18	5	i	Sergey Gryaztsov	RUS	36.98	+1.14
19	2	i	Nicola Tumolero	ITA	37.12	+1.28
20	4	o	Alexis Contin	FRA	37.33	+1.49
21	3	i	Ted-Jan Bloemen	CAN	37.68	+1.84
22	1	o	Michele Malfatti	ITA	38.07	+2.23
23	4	i	Patrick Beckert	GER	38.13	+2.29
24	1	i	Moritz Geisreiter	GER	38.57	+2.73

=== 5000 m ===
The race was started on 5 March 2016 at 13:47.

Rank	Pair	Lane	Name	Country	Time	Diff
1	12	o	Sven Kramer	NED	6:14.13	
2	11	i	Sverre Lunde Pedersen	NOR	6:16.89	+2.76
3	9	i	Jan Blokhuijsen	NED	6:17.80	+3.67
4	10	i	Ted-Jan Bloemen	CAN	6:19.84	+5.71
5	9	o	Patrick Beckert	GER	6:21.36	+7.23
6	10	o	Alexis Contin	FRA	6:23.60	+9.47
7	8	i	Andrea Giovannini	ITA	6:25.70	+11.57
8	7	i	Håvard Bøkko	NOR	6:27.97	+13.84
9	3	o	Simen Spieler Nilsen	NOR	6:30.52	+16.39
10	6	o	Nicola Tumolero	ITA	6:33.50	+19.37
11	2	o	Haralds Silovs	LAT	6:34.41	+20.28
12	4	i	Zbigniew Bródka	POL	6:34.55	+20.42
13	12	i	Moritz Geisreiter	GER	6:35.01	+20.88
14	2	i	Konrad Niedźwiedzki	POL	6:35.87	+21.74
15	6	i	Sergey Gryaztsov	RUS	6:36.42	+22.29
16	1	o	Michele Malfatti	ITA	6:36.46	+22.33
17	5	o	Jan Szymański	POL	6:37.13	+23.00
18	8	o	Shane Williamson	JPN	6:37.60	+23.47
19	1	i	Liu Yiming	CHN	6:37.87	+23.74
20	5	i	Vitaly Mikhailov	BLR	6:39.15	+25.02
21	4	o	Sergey Trofimov	RUS	6:40.89	+26.76
22	3	i	Shota Nakamura	JPN	6:41.28	+27.15
—	11	o	Bart Swings	BEL	DSQ	
—	7	o	Denis Yuskov	RUS	DNS	

=== 1500 m ===
The race was started on 6 March 2016 at 13:30.

Rank	Pair	Lane	Name	Country	Time	Diff
1	11	i	Sverre Lunde Pedersen	NOR	1:46.24	
2	8	o	Konrad Niedźwiedzki	POL	1:46.84	+0.60
3	12	i	Sven Kramer	NED	1:47.05	+0.81
4	7	o	Jan Szymański	POL	1:47.34	+1.10
5	1	i	Bart Swings	BEL	1:47.47	+1.23
6	12	o	Jan Blokhuijsen	NED	1:47.66	+1.42
7	8	i	Haralds Silovs	LAT	1:47.67	+1.43
8	6	o	Zbigniew Bródka	POL	1:47.74	+1.50
9	4	i	Sergey Gryaztsov	RUS	1:47.77	+1.53
10	11	o	Håvard Bøkko	NOR	1:47.93	+1.69
11	3	o	Sergey Trofimov	RUS	1:48.42	+2.18
12	5	o	Shota Nakamura	JPN	1:48.43	+2.19
13	9	i	Ted-Jan Bloemen	CAN	1:48.64	+2.40
14	9	o	Alexis Contin	FRA	1:48.75	+2.51
15	10	i	Andrea Giovannini	ITA	1:48.76	+2.52
16	10	o	Simen Spieler Nilsen	NOR	1:48.82	+2.58
17	5	i	Nicola Tumolero	ITA	1:49.00	+2.76
18	6	i	Liu Yiming	CHN	1:49.20	+2.96
19	7	i	Patrick Beckert	GER	1:49.38	+3.14
20	4	o	Shane Williamson	JPN	1:49.59	+3.35
21	3	i	Vitaly Mikhailov	BLR	1:51.04	+4.80
22	2	i	Michele Malfatti	ITA	1:51.12	+4.88
23	2	o	Moritz Geisreiter	GER	1:52.05	+5.81

=== 10000 m ===
The race was started on 6 March 2016 at 15:28.

Rank	Pair	Lane	Name	Country	Time	Diff
1	4	i	Sven Kramer	NED	13:07.19	
2	3	i	Jan Blokhuijsen	NED	13:10.92	+3.73
3	4	o	Sverre Lunde Pedersen	NOR	13:11.83	+4.64
4	3	o	Håvard Bøkko	NOR	13:19.25	+12.06
5	1	i	Ted-Jan Bloemen	CAN	13:21.91	+14.72
6	1	o	Patrick Beckert	GER	13:27.15	+19.96
7	2	i	Andrea Giovannini	ITA	13:32.05	+24.86
8	2	o	Konrad Niedźwiedzki	POL	14:11.76	+1:04.57

=== Final standings ===
After all events.

Rank	Name	Country	Points	Diff
1st place, gold medalist(s)	Sven Kramer	NED	148.995	
2nd place, silver medalist(s)	Sverre Lunde Pedersen	NOR	149.483	+0.49
3rd place, bronze medalist(s)	Jan Blokhuijsen	NED	149.672	+0.68
4	Håvard Bøkko	NOR	150.915	+1.92
5	Ted-Jan Bloemen	CAN	151.972	+2.98
6	Andrea Giovannini	ITA	152.215	+3.22
7	Patrick Beckert	GER	153.083	+4.09
8	Konrad Niedźwiedzki	POL	154.028	+5.04
9	Haralds Silovs	LAT	111.641	
10	Simen Spieler Nilsen	NOR	111.765	
11	Alexis Contin	FRA	111.940	
12	Jan Szymański	POL	112.063	
13	Zbigniew Bródka	POL	112.288	
14	Sergey Gryaztsov	RUS	112.545	
15	Liu Yiming	CHN	112.707	
16	Shota Nakamura	JPN	112.761	
17	Nicola Tumolero	ITA	112.803	
18	Sergey Trofimov	RUS	113.079	
19	Shane Williamson	JPN	113.230	
20	Vitaly Mikhailov	BLR	113.858	
21	Michele Malfatti	ITA	114.756	
22	Moritz Geisreiter	GER	115.421	
—	Bart Swings	BEL		
—	Denis Yuskov	RUS		
