= 2013 European Speed Skating Championships =

International speed skating competition

European Speed Skating Championships
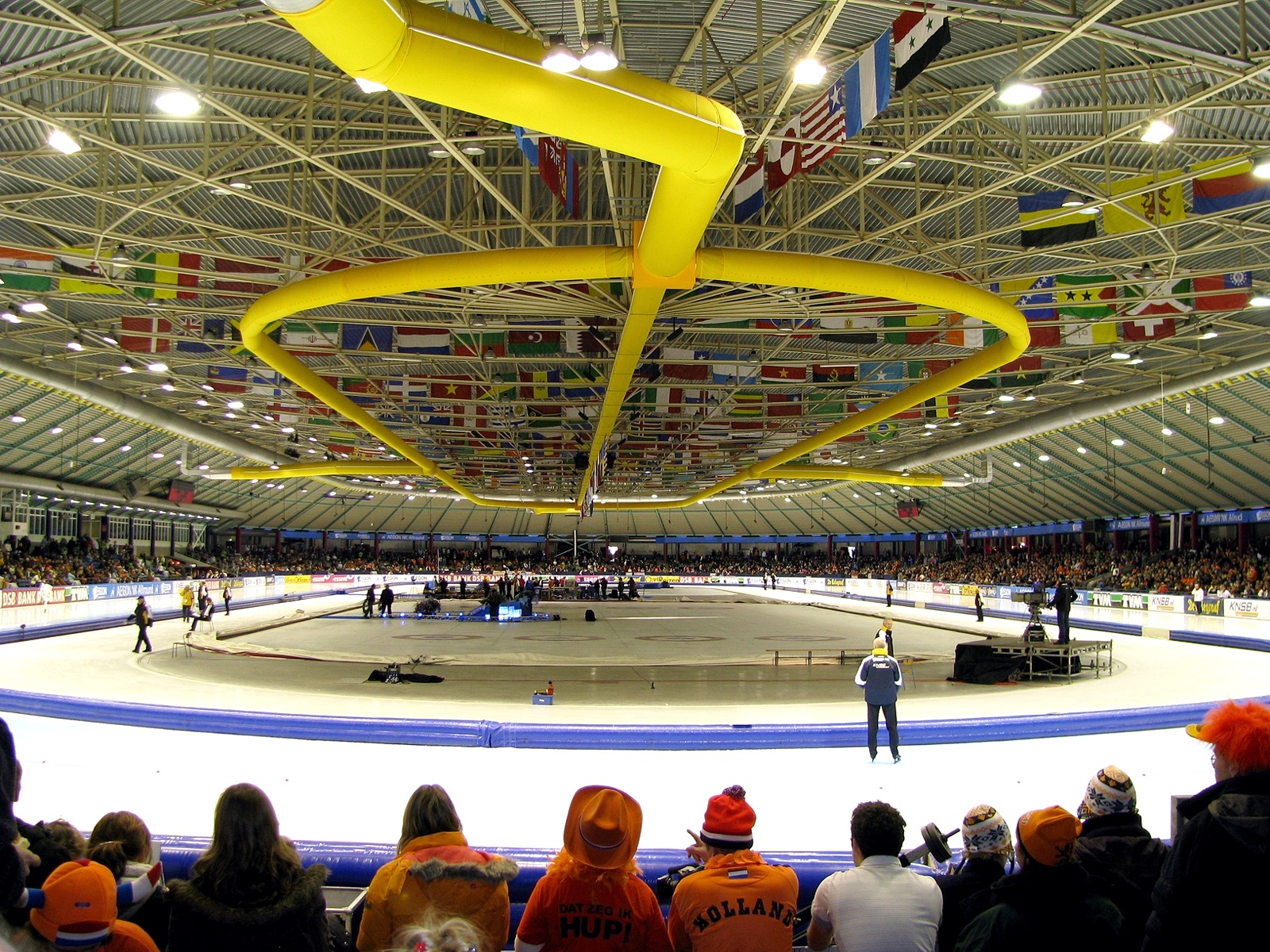
- Venue: Thialf, Heerenveen, Netherlands
- Dates: 11–13 January 2013
- Competitors: 52 from 17 nations

Medalist men
1st place, gold medalist(s)		Sven Kramer	NED
2nd place, silver medalist(s)		Jan Blokhuijsen	NED
3rd place, bronze medalist(s)		Håvard Bøkko	NOR

Medalist women
1st place, gold medalist(s)		Ireen Wüst	NED
2nd place, silver medalist(s)		Linda de Vries	NED
3rd place, bronze medalist(s)		Diane Valkenburg	NED

The 2013 European Speed Skating Championships was the 38th continental allround speed skating event for women and the 107th for men. The championships were held at the Thialf in Heerenveen, Netherlands, from 11 through 13 January 2013. Both the men's and women's championship consisted of four separate distance events and the winners are the skaters with the lowest points total after four distances. The competition was also a qualifying event for the 2013 World Allround Speed Skating Championships as the entry quotas were allocated according to the results of the European Championships. Sven Kramer and Ireen Wüst won the European titles.

== Venue ==
The competition took place at the Thialf, Heerenveen, Netherlands, an indoor artificial skating rink, on a standard 400 meters track with inner and outer curves with radii of 26 and 30 meters respectively. The venue has a capacity of 12,500 seats.

== Participating nations ==
A provisional list of competitors and staff had to be presented until 24 December 2012, while the final deadline of applications for the European Championships was closed on 8 January 2013. Every European member federation of the International Skating Union (ISU), whose racer met the qualification criteria were eligible to delegate one participant to the event, and, according to the rules of the ISU, the following nations had the right to enter additional competitors in virtue of their results in the previous continental event:

- Women:
  - 4 competitors: Netherlands
  - 3 competitors: Czech Republic, Germany, Norway, Poland, Russia
  - 2 competitors: Austria, Belgium
- Men:
  - 4 competitors: Netherlands
  - 3 competitors: Norway, Poland
  - 2 competitors: Austria, Belgium, France, Germany, Italy, Latvia, Russia

Eventually 52 competitors from 17 nations registered officially for the championships, not including the substitutes, in the following distribution:

- Austria (2)
- Belarus (2)
- Belgium (4)
- Czech Republic (3)
- Denmark (1)
- Finland (1)
- France (2)
- Germany (5)
- Hungary (1)
- Italy (2)
- Latvia (1)
- Netherlands (8)
- Norway (6)
- Poland (6)
- Romania (1)
- Russia (5)
- Sweden (1)

== Events ==
=== Schedule ===
10 January Thursday	11 January Friday	12 January Saturday	13 January Sunday
Team leaders meeting Opening draw	Opening ceremony 500 metres men 5000 metres men Drawing for Saturday’s distances	500 metres women 1500 metres men 3000 metres women Drawing for Sunday’s distances	1500 metres women 10000 metres men 5000 metres women Award ceremony

=== Women's competition ===
The women's European Championship were held over two days, Saturday and Sunday, with the 500 and 3000 metre events on the first day, followed by the 1500 and 5000 metre events on the second day. Skaters were awarded points according to their times, and the eight best placed competitors after the second day were eligible to participate in the 5000 metres closing event on the last day of the championship.

Martina Sáblíková was the defending 2012 European Champion and also won the title previously in 2007, 2010 and 2011.

==== 500 metres ====
Rank	Athlete	Country	Time	Behind	Points
1	Karolína Erbanová	Czech Republic	38.72 CR	0.00	38.720
2	Yekaterina Lobysheva	Russia	38.98	0.26	38.980
3	Antoinette de Jong	Netherlands	39.42	0.60	39.420
4	Ireen Wüst	Netherlands	39.69	0.97	39.690
5	Yekaterina Shikhova	Russia	39.90	1.21	40.670
6	Diane Valkenburg	Netherlands	39.93	1.26	39.930
7	Linda de Vries	Netherlands	39.98	1.26	39.980
8	Claudia Pechstein	Germany	40.01	1.29	40.010
9	Ida Njåtun	Norway	40.15	1.43	40.150
10	Olga Graf	Russia	40.26	1.54	40.260
11	Vanessa Bittner	Austria	40.31	1.59	40.310
12	Luiza Złotkowska	Poland	40.34	1.62	40.340
13	Natalia Czerwonka	Poland	40.35	1.63	40.350
14	Ágota Toth-Lykovcan	Hungary	40.71	1.99	40.710
15	Katarzyna Woźniak	Poland	40.84	2.12	40.840
16	Martina Sáblíková	Czech Republic	40.95	2.23	40.950
17	Francesca Lollobrigida	Italy	41.02	2.30	41.020
18	Anna Rokita	Austria	41.15	2.43	41.150
19	Johanna Östlund	Sweden	41.22	2.50	41.220
20	Tatyana Mikhailova	Belarus	41.23	2.51	41.230

==== 3000 metres ====
Rank	Athlete	Country	Time	Behind	Points
1	Ireen Wüst	Netherlands	4:01.25 CR	0.00	40.208
2	Martina Sáblíková	Czech Republic	4:03.68	2.43	40.613
3	Linda de Vries	Netherlands	4:05.33	4.08	40.888
4	Diane Valkenburg	Netherlands	4:05.84	5.20	41.075
5	Stephanie Beckert	Germany	4:06.45	5.20	41.075
6	Antoinette de Jong	Netherlands	4:07.48	6.23	41.246
7	Ida Njåtun	Norway	4:07.77	6.52	41.295
8	Olga Graf	Russia	4:08.64	7.39	41.440
9	Claudia Pechstein	Germany	4:09.67	8.42	41.611
10	Natalia Czerwonka	Poland	4:10.90	9.65	41.816

==== 1500 metres ====
Rank	Athlete	Country	Time	Behind	Points
1	Ireen Wüst	Netherlands	1:56.39 CR	0.00	38.796
2	Linda de Vries	Netherlands	1:57.57	1.18	39.190
3	Diane Valkenburg	Netherlands	1:57.76	1.37	39.253
4	Ida Njåtun	Norway	1:58.57	2.18	39.523
5	Martina Sáblíková	Czech Republic	1:58.68	2.29	39.560
6	Claudia Pechstein	Germany	1:58.80	2.41	39.600
7	Yekaterina Shikhova	Russia	1:58.85	2.46	39.616
8	Antoinette de Jong	Netherlands	1:59.02	2.63	39.673
9	Olga Graf	Russia	1:59.24	2.85	39.746
10	Yekaterina Lobysheva	Russia	1:59.50	3.11	39.833

==== 5000 metres ====
Rank	Athlete	Country	Time	Behind	Points
1	Martina Sáblíková	Czech Republic	6:57.16	0.00	41.716
2	Ireen Wüst	Netherlands	7:01.95	4.79	42.195
3	Linda de Vries	Netherlands	7:02.77	5.61	42.277
4	Diane Valkenburg	Netherlands	7:05.56	8.40	42.556
5	Antoinette de Jong	Netherlands	7:08.52	11.36	42.852
6	Olga Graf	Russia	7:09.90	12.74	42.990
7	Claudia Pechstein	Germany	7:14.08	16.92	43.408
8	Ida Njåtun	Norway	7:17.73	20.57	43.773

==== Final classification ====
Rank	Athlete	Country	500 m	3000 m	1500 m	5000 m	Points	Behind
1st place, gold medalist(s)	Ireen Wüst	Netherlands	39.69 (4)	4:01.25 (1)	1:56.39 (1)	7:01.95 (2)	160.889 (1)	0.00
2nd place, silver medalist(s)	Linda de Vries	Netherlands	39.98 (7)	4:05.33 (3)	1:57.57 (2)	7:02.77 (3)	162.335 (2)	1.45
3rd place, bronze medalist(s)	Diane Valkenburg	Netherlands	39.93 (6)	4:05.84 (4)	1:57.76 (3)	7:05.56 (4)	162.712 (3)	1.83
4	Martina Sáblíková	Czech Republic	40.95 (16)	4:03.68 (2)	1:58.68 (5)	6:57.16 (1)	162.839 (4)	1.95
5	Antoinette de Jong	Netherlands	39.42 (3)	4:07.48 (6)	1:59.02 (8)	7:08.52 (5)	163.191 (5)	2.31
6	Olga Graf	Russia	40.26 (10)	4:08.64 (8)	4:08.64 (8)	7:09.90 (6)	164.436 (6) NR	3.55
7	Claudia Pechstein	Germany	40.01 (8)	4:09.67 (9)	1:58.80 (6)	7:14.08 (7)	164.629 (7)	3.74
8	Ida Njåtun	Norway	40.15 (9)	4:07.77 (7)	1:58.57 (4)	7:17.73 (8)	164.741 (8)	3.86
9	Yekaterina Lobysheva	Russia	38.98 (2)	4:15.23 (13)	1:59.50 (10)		121.351 (9)	
10	Yekaterina Shikhova	Russia	39.90 (5)	4:14.83 (12)	1:58.85 (7)		177.289 (10)	

=== Men's competition ===
The men's event took place over three days, with the 500 metres and the 5000 metres race on the first day, the 1500 on the second day and 10,000 meters race on the final day. After the first day, the best 24 out of the 26 skaters got the change to participate in the 5000 meters event, while the best eight competitors after three events took part in the 10,000 meters race.

==== 500 metres ====
Rank	Athlete	Country	Time	Behind	Points
1	Konrad Niedźwiedzki	Poland	35.93	0.00	35.930
2	Zbigniew Bródka	Poland	36.03	0.10	36.030
3	Håvard Bøkko	Norway	36.14	0.21	36.140
4	Jan Blokhuijsen	Netherlands	36.40	0.47	36.400
5	Simen Spieler Nilsen	Norway	36.54	0.61	36.540
6	Jan Szymański	Poland	36.61	0.68	36.610
7	David Andersson	Sweden	36.70	0.77	36.700
7	Sven Kramer	Netherlands	36.70	0.77	36.700
9	Sverre Lunde Pedersen	Norway	36.86	0.93	36.860
10	Haralds Silovs	Latvia	36.90	0.97	36.900

==== 5000 metres ====
Rank	Athlete	Country	Time	Behind	Points
1	Sven Kramer	Netherlands	6:12.55	0.00	37.255
2	Jan Blokhuijsen	Netherlands	6:18.16	5.61	37.816
3	Sverre Lunde Pedersen	Norway	6:19.07	6.52	37.907
4	Bart Swings	Belgium	6:19.13	6.58	37.913
5	Ivan Skobrev	Russia	6:19.85	7.30	37.985
6	Moritz Geisreiter	Germany	6:22.10	9.55	38.210
7	Håvard Bøkko	Norway	6:23.38	10.83	38.338
8	Renz Rotteveel	Netherlands	6:24.42	11.87	38.442
9	Haralds Silovs	Latvia	6:28.19	15.64	38.819
10	Jan Szymański	Poland	6:29.81	17.26	38.981

==== 1500 metres ====
Rank	Athlete	Country	Time	Behind	Points
1	Konrad Niedzwiedzki	Poland	1:46.32	0.00	35.440
2	Zbigniew Brodka	Poland	1:46.38	0.06	35.460
3	Sverre Lunde Pedersen	Netherlands	1:46.39	0.07	35.463
4	Bart Swings	Belgium	1:46.47	0.15	35.490
5	Håvard Bøkko	Norway	1:46.78	0.46	35.593
6	Jan Szymański	Poland	1:47.24	0.92	35.746
7	Haralds Silovs	Latvia	1:47.29	0.97	35.763
8	Sven Kramer	Netherlands	1:47.49	1.17	35.830
9	Renz Rotteveel	Netherlands	1:47.77	1.45	35.923
10	Jan Blokhuijsen	Netherlands	1:47.89	1.57	35.963

==== 10000 metres ====
Rank	Athlete	Country	Time	Behind	Points
1	Sven Kramer	Netherlands	12:55.98 CR	0.00	38.799
2	Jan Blokhuijsen	Netherlands	13:01.60	5.62	39.080
3	Bart Swings	Belgium	13:08.08	12.10	39.404
4	Håvard Bøkko	Norway	13:08.16	12.18	39.408
5	Moritz Geisreiter	Germany	13:09.68	13.70	39.484
6	Sverre Lunde Pedersen	Norway	13:12.86	16.88	39.643
7	Ivan Skobrev	Russia	13:29.27	33.29	40.463
8	Konrad Niedzwiedzki	Poland	13:45.13	49.15	41.256

==== Final classification ====
Rank	Athlete	Country	500 m	5000 m	1500 m	10000 m	Points	Behind
1st place, gold medalist(s)	Sven Kramer	Netherlands	36.70 (7)	6:12.55 (1)	1:47.49 (8)	12:55.98 (1)	148.584 (1)	0.00
2nd place, silver medalist(s)	Jan Blokhuijsen	Netherlands	36.40 (4)	6:18.16 (2)	1:47.89 (10)	13:01.60 (2)	149.259 (2)	0.68
3rd place, bronze medalist(s)	Håvard Bøkko	Norway	36.14 (3)	6:23.38 (7)	1:46.78 (5)	13:08.16 (4)	149.479 (3)	0.90
4	Sverre Lunde Pedersen	Norway	36.86 (9)	6:19.07 (3)	1:46.39 (3)	13:12.86 (6)	149.873 (4)	1.29
5	Bart Swings	Belgium	37.47 (19)	6:19.13 (4)	1:46.47 (4)	13:08.08 (3)	150.277 (5) NR	1.70
6	Ivan Skobrev	Russia	36.91 (11)	6:19.85 (5)	1:48.59 (12)	13:29.27 (7)	151.554 (6)	2.97
7	Konrad Niedzwiedzki	Poland	35.93 (1)	6:33.75 (13)	1:46.32 (1)	13:45.13 (8)	152.001 (7)	3.42
8	Moritz Geisreiter	Germany	38.03 (21)	6:22.10 (6)	1:48.96 (13)	13:09.68 (5)	152.044 (8) NR	3.46
9	Zbigniew Bródka	Poland	36.03 (2)	6:35.17 (14)	1:46.38 (2)		111.007 (9)	
10	Renz Rotteveel	Netherlands	36.93 (12)	6:24.42 (8)	1:47.77 (9)		111.295 (10)	

== See also ==
- 2013 World Allround Speed Skating Championships
