= 2018 World Allround Speed Skating Championships – Men =

Men at the 2018 World Allround Speed Skating Championships
- Venue: Olympic Stadium
- Location: Amsterdam, Netherlands
- Dates: 10–11 March
- Competitors: 24 from 14 nations
- Winning points: 154.547

Medalists
gold medal	Patrick Roest	Netherlands
silver medal	Sverre Lunde Pedersen	Norway
bronze medal	Marcel Bosker	Netherlands

The Men competition at the 2018 World Allround Speed Skating Championships was held on 10 and 11 March 2018.

== Results ==
=== 500 m ===
The race was started on 10 March at 16:15.

Rank	Pair	Lane	Name	Country	Time	Diff
1	2	i	Patrick Roest	Netherlands	36.97	
2	12	o	Konrad Niedźwiedzki	Poland	37.00	+0.03
3	8	i	Haralds Silovs	Latvia	37.04	+0.07
4	11	i	Jan Szymański	Poland	37.21	+0.24
5	10	o	Sverre Lunde Pedersen	Norway	37.42	+0.45
6	3	o	Sven Kramer	Netherlands	37.43	+0.46
7	12	i	Simen Spieler Nilsen	Norway	37.50	+0.53
8	3	i	Shota Nakamura	Japan	37.51	+0.54
9	9	o	Håvard Bøkko	Norway	37.55	+0.58
10	10	i	Sergey Trofimov	Russia	37.64	+0.67
11	9	i	Antoine Gélinas-Beaulieu	Canada	37.65	+0.68
12	11	o	Marcel Bosker	Netherlands	37.85	+0.88
13	5	i	Sergey Gryaztsov	Russia	37.91	+0.94
14	1	o	Bart Swings	Belgium	37.96	+0.99
15	6	i	Denny Morrison	Canada	37.97	+1.00
16	6	o	Andrea Giovannini	Italy	38.06	+1.09
17	8	o	Nils van der Poel	Sweden	38.35	+1.38
18	7	i	Danila Semerikov	Russia	38.73	+1.76
19	4	o	Ted-Jan Bloemen	Canada	38.82	+1.84
20	7	o	Linus Heidegger	Austria	38.98	+2.01
21	5	o	Moritz Geisreiter	Germany	39.57	+2.60
22	1	i	Viktor Hald Thorup	Denmark	39.58	+2.61
23	4	i	Davide Ghiotto	Italy	40.46	+3.49
24	2	o	Sebastian Druszkiewicz	Czech Republic	40.89	+3.92

=== 5000 m ===
The race was started on 10 March at 18:14.

Rank	Pair	Lane	Name	Country	Time	Diff
1	12	o	Sverre Lunde Pedersen	Norway	6:33.81	
2	9	o	Sven Kramer	Netherlands	6:34.15	+0.34
3	10	i	Marcel Bosker	Netherlands	6:35.39	+1.58
4	6	i	Patrick Roest	Netherlands	6:37.07	+3.26
5	6	o	Danila Semerikov	Russia	6:37.14	+3.33
6	7	i	Nils van der Poel	Sweden	6:37.14	+3.33
7	10	o	Bart Swings	Belgium	6:39.57	+5.77
8	9	i	Andrea Giovannini	Italy	6:45.16	+11.35
9	7	o	Håvard Bøkko	Norway	6:45.46	+11.65
10	1	o	Viktor Hald Thorup	Denmark	6:48.10	+14.29
11	1	i	Linus Heidegger	Austria	6:50.96	+17.15
12	5	i	Haralds Silovs	Latvia	6:52.47	+18.66
13	2	o	Sergey Trofimov	Russia	6:52.81	+19.00
14	4	i	Sergey Gryaztsov	Russia	6:53.01	+19.20
15	12	i	Ted-Jan Bloemen	Canada	6:53.09	+19.27
16	11	o	Moritz Geisreiter	Germany	6:53.38	+19.57
17	8	o	Davide Ghiotto	Italy	6:53.61	+19.80
18	11	i	Simen Spieler Nilsen	Norway	6:54.82	+21.01
19	3	i	Sebastian Druszkiewicz	Czech Republic	6:56.10	+22.29
20	8	i	Jan Szymański	Poland	6:58.79	+24.98
21	5	o	Denny Morrison	Canada	6:59.34	+25.53
22	3	o	Antoine Gélinas-Beaulieu	Canada	7:03.22	+29.41
23	4	o	Konrad Niedźwiedzki	Poland	7:05.57	+31.76
24	2	i	Shota Nakamura	Japan	7:09.12	+35.31

=== 1500 m ===
The race was started on 11 March at 13:29.

Rank	Pair	Lane	Name	Country	Time	Diff
1	12	o	Sverre Lunde Pedersen	Norway	1:48.34	
2	12	i	Patrick Roest	Netherlands	1:49.87	+1.54
3	9	o	Haralds Silovs	Latvia	1:49.97	+1.64
4	10	i	Bart Swings	Belgium	1:50.33	+2.00
5	11	i	Sven Kramer	Netherlands	1:50.62	+2.29
6	3	i	Ted-Jan Bloemen	Canada	1:51.22	+2.89
7	11	o	Marcel Bosker	Netherlands	1:51.28	+2.94
8	9	i	Håvard Bøkko	Norway	1:51.60	+3.27
9	7	i	Sergey Trofimov	Russia	1:51.82	+3.49
10	5	i	Konrad Niedzwiedzki	Poland	1:52.08	+3.75
11	5	o	Denny Morrison	Canada	1:52.09	+3.76
12	6	o	Sergey Gryaztsov	Russia	1:53.02	+4.69
13	10	o	Nils van der Poel	Sweden	1:53.15	+4.82
14	7	o	Simen Spieler Nilsen	Norway	1:53.30	+4.97
15	8	i	Danila Semerikov	Russia	1:53.43	+5.10
16	2	i	Shota Nakamura	Japan	1:53.57	+5.24
17	8	o	Andrea Giovannini	Italy	1:53.63	+5.30
18	4	o	Linus Heidegger	Austria	1:53.74	+5.41
19	4	i	Antoine Gelinas-Beaulieu	Canada	1:53.76	+5.43
20	6	i	Jan Szymanski	Poland	1:54.02	+5.69
21	3	o	Viktor Hald Thorup	Denmark	1:54.07	+5.74
22	2	o	Moritz Geisreiter	Germany	1:56.83	+8.50
23	1	i	Davide Ghiotto	Italy	1:57.68	+9.35
24	1	o	Sebastian Druszkiewicz	Czech Republic	1:58.58	+10.25

=== 10000 m ===
The race was started on 11 March at 15:10.

Rank	Pair	Lane	Name	Country	Time	Diff
1	1	i	Nils van der Poel	Sweden	13:40.38	
2	3	o	Patrick Roest	Netherlands	13:44.94	+4.56
3	3	i	Marcel Bosker	Netherlands	13:49.49	+9.11
4	2	i	Bart Swings	Belgium	13:51.45	+11.07
5	4	i	Sverre Lunde Pedersen	Norway	14:00.60	+20.22
6	4	o	Sven Kramer	Netherlands	14:05.70	+25.32
7	2	o	Haralds Silovs	Latvia	14:55.08	+74.70
–	1	o	Danila Semerikov	Russia	DSQ	

=== Overall standings ===
After all events.

Rank	Name	Country	500m	5000m	1500m	10000m	Points	Diff
1st place, gold medalist(s)	Patrick Roest	Netherlands	36.97	6:37.07	1:49.87	13:44.94	154.547	
2nd place, silver medalist(s)	Sverre Lunde Pedersen	Norway	37.42	6:33.81	1:48.33	14:00.60	154.941	+0.40
3rd place, bronze medalist(s)	Marcel Bosker	Netherlands	37.85	6:35.39	1:51.28	13:49.49	155.953	+1.41
4	Sven Kramer	Netherlands	37.43	6:34.15	1:50.62	14:05.70	156.003	+1.46
5	Bart Swings	Belgium	37.96	6:39.57	1:50.33	13:51.45	156.266	+1.72
6	Nils van der Poel	Sweden	38.35	6:37.14	1:53.15	13:40.38	156.799	+2.26
7	Haralds Silovs	Latvia	37.04	6:52.47	1:49.97	14:55.08	159.697	+5.15
8	Danila Semerikov	Russia	38.73	6:37.14	1:53.43	DSQ	–	–
9	Håvard Bøkko	Norway	37.55	6:45.46	1:51.60	—	115.296	—
10	Sergey Trofimov	Russia	37.64	6:52.81	1:51.82	—	116.194	—
11	Andrea Giovannini	Italy	38.06	6:45.16	1:53.63	—	116.452	—
12	Simen Spieler Nilsen	Norway	37.50	6:54.82	1:53.30	—	116.748	—
13	Sergey Gryaztsov	Russia	37.91	6:53.01	1:53.02	—	116.884	—
14	Konrad Niedźwiedzki	Poland	37.00	7:05.57	1:52.08	—	116.917	—
15	Jan Szymański	Poland	37.21	6:58.79	1:54.02	—	117.095	—
16	Ted-Jan Bloemen	Canada	38.81	6:53.09	1:51.22	—	117.191	—
17	Denny Morrison	Canada	37.97	6:59.34	1:52.09	—	117.267	—
18	Antoine Gélinas-Beaulieu	Canada	37.65	7:03.22	1:53.76	—	117.892	—
19	Linus Heidegger	Austria	38.98	6:50.96	1:53.74	—	117.989	—
20	Shota Nakamura	Japan	37.51	7:09.12	1:53.57	—	118.278	—
21	Viktor Hald Thorup	Denmark	39.58	6:48.10	1:54.07	—	118.413	—
22	Moritz Geisreiter	Germany	39.57	6:53.38	1:56.83	—	119.851	—
23	Davide Ghiotto	Italy	40.46	6:53.61	1:57.68	—	121.047	—
24	Sebastian Druszkiewicz	Czech Republic	40.89	6:56.10	1:58.58	—	122.026	—
