= 2016 European Speed Skating Championships =

International speed skating competition

- Venue: Minsk-Arena, Minsk, Belarus
- Dates: 9–10 January 2016

Medalist men
1st place, gold medalist(s)		Sven Kramer	NED
2nd place, silver medalist(s)		Bart Swings	BEL
3rd place, bronze medalist(s)		Jan Blokhuijsen	NED

Medalist women
1st place, gold medalist(s)		Martina Sáblíková	CZE
2nd place, silver medalist(s)		Ireen Wüst	NED
3rd place, bronze medalist(s)		Antoinette de Jong	NED

The 2016 European Speed Skating Championships were held in Minsk, Belarus, from 9 to 10 January 2016. Skaters from 17 countries participated.

Sven Kramer and Ireen Wüst of the Netherlands were the defending champions. Kramer successfully defended his title, winning a record 8th title overall, and Martina Sáblíková of the Czech Republic won her 5th title.

== Schedule ==
The schedule of events:

Date	Events
Saturday, 9 January; 15:00h	500 m women 500 m men 3000 m women 5000 m men
Sunday, 10 January; 15:00h	1500 m women 1500 m men 5000 m women 10,000 m men

All times are FET (UTC+3).

== Men's championships ==
DNS = did not start, WDR = withdrew, DQ = disqualified

=== Day 1 ===
==== 500 metres ====
Rank	Skater	Nat.	Time	Behind	Points
1	Denis Yuskov	(Russia)	36.23		36.230
2	Zbigniew Bródka	(Poland)	36.46	+0.23	36.460
3	Konrád Nagy	(Hungary)	36.48	+0.25	36.480
4	Sven Kramer	(Netherlands)	36.56	+0.33	36.560
5	Jan Blokhuijsen	(Netherlands)	36.57	+0.34	36.570
6	Håvard Bøkko	(Norway)	36.63	+0.40	36.630
7	Haralds Silovs	(Latvia)	36.70	+0.47	36.700
8	Sindre Henriksen	(Norway)	36.71	+0.48	36.710
9	Bart Swings	(Belgium)	36.73	+0.50	36.730
10	Piotr Puszkarski	(Poland)	36.76	+0.53	36.760
11	Andrea Giovannini	(Italy)	36.87	+0.64	36.870
12	Vitaly Mikhailov	(Belarus)	36.88	+0.65	36.880
13	Sergey Trofimov	(Russia)	36.97	+0.74	36.970
14	Sergey Gryaztsov	(Russia)	37.02	+0.79	37.020
15	Nicola Tumolero	(Italy)	37.19	+0.96	37.190
16	Jan Szymański	(Poland)	37.21	+0.98	37.210
17	Linus Heidegger	(Austria)	37.23	+1.00	37.230
18	Livio Wenger	(Switzerland)	37.38	+1.15	37.380
19	Douwe de Vries	(Netherlands)	37.75	+1.52	37.750
20	Iñigo Vidondo	(Spain)	38.25	+2.02	38.250
21	Jonas Pflug	(Germany)	38.37	+2.14	38.370
22	Tuomas Rahnasto	(Finland)	38.50	+2.27	38.500
23	Felix Maly	(Germany)	38.76	+2.53	38.760
	Sverre Lunde Pedersen	(Norway)	WDR		

==== 5000 metres ====
Rank	Skater	Nat.	Time	Behind	Points
1	Sven Kramer	(Netherlands)	6:19.17		37.917
2	Jan Blokhuijsen	(Netherlands)	6:22.36	+3.19	38.236
3	Bart Swings	(Belgium)	6:24.91	+5.74	38.491
4	Håvard Bøkko	(Norway)	6:31.62	+12.45	39.162
5	Andrea Giovannini	(Italy)	6:32.22	+13.05	39.222
6	Haralds Silovs	(Latvia)	6:33.83	+14.66	39.383
7	Jan Szymański	(Poland)	6:34.43	+15.26	39.443
8	Denis Yuskov	(Russia)	6:35.81	+16.64	39.581
9	Nicola Tumolero	(Italy)	6:36.40	+17.23	39.640
10	Sindre Henriksen	(Norway)	6:38.23	+19.06	39.823
11	Vitaly Mikhailov	(Belarus)	6:38.56	+19.39	39.856
12	Sergey Gryaztsov	(Russia)	6:39.18	+20.01	39.918
13	Douwe de Vries	(Netherlands)	6:41.56	+22.39	40.156
14	Sergey Trofimov	(Russia)	6:41.84	+22.67	40.184
15	Zbigniew Bródka	(Poland)	6:42.80	+23.63	40.280
16	Linus Heidegger	(Austria)	6:43.13	+23.96	40.313
17	Livio Wenger	(Switzerland)	6:44.78	+25.61	40.478
18	Felix Maly	(Germany)	6:46.08	+26.91	40.608
19	Piotr Puszkarski	(Poland)	6:51.77	+32.60	41.177
20	Konrád Nagy	(Hungary)	6:58.03	+38.86	41.803
21	Iñigo Vidondo	(Spain)	6:58.59	+39.42	41.859
22	Tuomas Rahnasto	(Finland)	7:02.48	+43.31	42.248
	Jonas Pflug	(Germany)	DNS		
	Sverre Lunde Pedersen	(Norway)	WDR		

=== Day 2 ===
==== 1500 metres ====
Rank	Skater	Nat.	Time	Behind	Points
1	Denis Yuskov	(Russia)	1:45.18		35.060
2	Bart Swings	(Belgium)	1:46.41	+1.23	35.470
3	Jan Szymański	(Poland)	1:47.48	+2.30	35.826
4	Zbigniew Bródka	(Poland)	1:48.05	+2.87	36.016
5	Sven Kramer	(Netherlands)	1:48.08	+2.90	36.026
6	Haralds Silovs	(Latvia)	1:48.46	+3.28	36.153
7	Sindre Henriksen	(Norway)	1:48.56	+3.38	36.186
8	Sergey Gryaztsov	(Russia)	1:48.70	+3.52	36.233
9	Jan Blokhuijsen	(Netherlands)	1:48.79	+3.61	36.263
10	Håvard Bøkko	(Norway)	1:48.87	+3.69	36.290
11	Sergey Trofimov	(Russia)	1:48.92	+3.74	36.306
12	Andrea Giovannini	(Italy)	1:48.97	+3.79	36.323
13	Konrád Nagy	(Hungary)	1:49.03	+3.85	36.343
14	Vitaly Mikhailov	(Belarus)	1:49.98	+4.80	36.660
15	Nicola Tumolero	(Italy)	1:50.48	+5.30	36.826
16	Linus Heidegger	(Austria)	1:50.49	+5.31	36.830
17	Livio Wenger	(Switzerland)	1:51.13	+5.95	37.043
18	Iñigo Vidondo	(Spain)	1:53.62	+8.44	37.873
19	Felix Maly	(Germany)	1:55.24	+10.06	38.413
20	Tuomas Rahnasto	(Finland)	1:56.24	+11.06	38.746
21	Piotr Puszkarski	(Poland)	DQ		
22	Douwe de Vries	(Netherlands)	WDR		
	Jonas Pflug	(Germany)	DNS		
	Sverre Lunde Pedersen	(Norway)	WDR		

==== 10,000 metres ====
Rank	Skater	Nat.	Time	Behind	Points
1	Sven Kramer	(Netherlands)	13:11.98		39.599
2	Bart Swings	(Belgium)	13:15.47	+3.49	39.773
3	Jan Blokhuijsen	(Netherlands)	13:22.14	+10.16	40.107
4	Håvard Bøkko	(Norway)	13:35.21	+23.23	40.760
5	Andrea Giovannini	(Italy)	13:41.39	+29.41	41.069
6	Haralds Silovs	(Latvia)	13:53.25	+41.27	41.662
7	Jan Szymański	(Poland)	13:57.27	+45.29	41.863
8	Sindre Henriksen	(Norway)	14:16.64	+64.66	42.832
	Denis Yuskov	(Russia)	WDR		

=== Final ranking ===
Rank	Skater	Nat.	500 m	5000 m	1500 m	10,000 m	Points	Behind
1st place, gold medalist(s)	Sven Kramer	(Netherlands)	36.56 (4)	6:19.17 (1)	1:48.08 (5)	13:11.98 (1)	150.102	
2nd place, silver medalist(s)	Bart Swings	(Belgium)	36.73 (9)	6:24.91 (3)	1:46.41 (2)	13:15.47 (2)	150.464	+0.37
3rd place, bronze medalist(s)	Jan Blokhuijsen	(Netherlands)	36.57 (5)	6:22.36 (2)	1:48.79 (9)	13:22.14 (3)	151.176	+1.08
4	Håvard Bøkko	(Norway)	36.63 (6)	6:31.62 (4)	1:48.87 (10)	13:35.21 (4)	152.842	+2.74
5	Andrea Giovannini	(Italy)	36.87 (11)	6:32.22 (5)	1:48.97 (12)	13:41.39 (5)	153.484	+3.39
6	Haralds Silovs	(Latvia)	36.70 (7)	6:33.83 (6)	1:48.46 (6)	13:53.25 (6)	153.898	+3.80
7	Jan Szymański	(Poland)	37.21 (16)	6:34.43 (7)	1:47.48 (3)	13:57.27 (7)	154.342	+4.24
8	Sindre Henriksen	(Norway)	36.71 (8)	6:38.23 (10)	1:48.56 (7)	14:16.64 (8)	155.551	+5.45
9	Denis Yuskov	(Russia)	36.23 (1)	6:35.81 (8)	1:45.18 (1)		110.871	
10	Zbigniew Bródka	(Poland)	36.46 (2)	6:42.80 (15)	1:48.05 (4)		112.756	
11	Sergey Gryaztsov	(Russia)	37.02 (14)	6:39.18 (12)	1:48.70 (8)		113.171	
12	Vitaly Mikhailov	(Belarus)	36.88 (12)	6:38.56 (11)	1:49.98 (14)		113.396	
13	Sergey Trofimov	(Russia)	36.97 (13)	6:41.84 (14)	1:48.92 (11)		113.460	
14	Nicola Tumolero	(Italy)	37.19 (15)	6:36.40 (9)	1:50.48 (15)		113.656	
15	Linus Heidegger	(Austria)	37.23 (17)	6:43.13 (16)	1:50.49 (16)		114.373	
16	Konrád Nagy	(Hungary)	36.48 (3)	6:58.03 (20)	1:49.03 (13)		114.626	
17	Livio Wenger	(Switzerland)	37.38 (18)	6:44.78 (17)	1:51.13 (17)		114.901	
18	Felix Maly	(Germany)	38.76 (23)	6:46.08 (18)	1:55.24 (19)		117.781	
19	Iñigo Vidondo	(Spain)	38.25 (20)	6:58.59 (21)	1:53.62 (18)		117.982	
20	Tuomas Rahnasto	(Finland)	38.50 (22)	7:02.48 (22)	1:56.24 (20)		119.494	
21	Piotr Puszkarski	(Poland)	36.76 (10)	6:51.77 (19)	DQ (21)		–	
22	Douwe de Vries	(Netherlands)	37.75 (19)	6:41.56 (13)	WDR (22)		–	
23	Sverre Lunde Pedersen	(Norway)	WDR (24)	WDR (24)			–	
24	Jonas Pflug	(Germany)	38.37 (21)	DNS (23)			–	

== Women's championships ==
=== Day 1 ===
==== 500 metres ====
Rank	Skater	Nat.	Time	Behind	Points
1	Ida Njåtun	(Norway)	39.74		39.740
2	Antoinette de Jong	(Netherlands)	39.76	+0.02	39.760
3	Ireen Wüst	(Netherlands)	39.90	+0.16	39.900
4	Martina Sáblíková	(Czech Republic)	39.98	+0.24	39.980
5	Elizaveta Kazelina	(Russia)	40.18	+0.44	40.180
6	Marije Joling	(Netherlands)	40.33	+0.59	40.330
7	Natalia Czerwonka	(Poland)	40.36	+0.62	40.360
8	Natalya Voronina	(Russia)	40.46	+0.72	40.460
9	Luiza Złotkowska	(Poland)	40.47	+0.73	40.470
10	Marina Zueva	(Belarus)	40.54	+0.80	40.540
11	Olga Graf	(Russia)	40.57	+0.83	40.570
11	Francesca Lollobrigida	(Italy)	40.57	+0.83	40.570
13	Tatyana Mikhailova	(Belarus)	40.63	+0.89	40.630
14	Nikola Zdráhalová	(Czech Republic)	40.89	+1.15	40.89
15	Sofie-Karoline Haugen	(Norway)	41.07	+1.33	41.070
16	Leia Behlau	(Germany)	42.30	+2.56	42.300
17	Saskia Alusalu	(Estonia)	43.09	+3.35	43.090

==== 3000 metres ====
Rank	Skater	Nat.	Time	Behind	Points
1	Martina Sáblíková	(Czech Republic)	4:03.79		40.631
2	Marije Joling	(Netherlands)	4:07.14	+3.35	41.190
3	Ireen Wüst	(Netherlands)	4:07.32	+3.53	41.220
4	Antoinette de Jong	(Netherlands)	4:09.00	+5.21	41.500
5	Natalya Voronina	(Russia)	4:09.61	+5.82	41.601
6	Ida Njåtun	(Norway)	4:10.69	+6.90	41.781
7	Francesca Lollobrigida	(Italy)	4:15.40	+11.61	42.566
8	Olga Graf	(Russia)	4:16.06	+12.27	42.676
9	Elizaveta Kazelina	(Russia)	4:16.13	+12.34	42.688
10	Luiza Złotkowska	(Poland)	4:16.68	+12.89	42.780
11	Marina Zueva	(Belarus)	4:17.80	+14.01	42.966
12	Natalia Czerwonka	(Poland)	4:18.20	+14.41	43.033
13	Nikola Zdráhalová	(Czech Republic)	4:19.54	+15.75	43.256
14	Sofie-Karoline Haugen	(Norway)	4:22.40	+18.61	43.733
15	Saskia Alusalu	(Estonia)	4:24.31	+20.52	44.051
16	Leia Behlau	(Germany)	4:27.12	+23.33	44.520
17	Tatyana Mikhailova	(Belarus)	4:29.60	+25.81	44.933

=== Day 2 ===
==== 1500 metres ====
Rank	Skater	Nat.	Time	Behind	Points
1	Martina Sáblíková	(Czech Republic)	1:57.00		39.000
2	Ireen Wüst	(Netherlands)	1:57.01	+0.01	39.003
3	Ida Njåtun	(Norway)	1:58.51	+1.51	39.503
4	Antoinette de Jong	(Netherlands)	1:58.80	+1.80	39.600
5	Marije Joling	(Netherlands)	1:58.90	+1.90	39.633
6	Olga Graf	(Russia)	1:59.00	+2.00	39.666
7	Luiza Złotkowska	(Poland)	1:59.40	+2.40	39.800
8	Natalia Czerwonka	(Poland)	1:59.57	+2.57	39.856
9	Elizaveta Kazelina	(Russia)	2:00.02	+3.02	40.006
10	Natalya Voronina	(Russia)	2:01.46	+4.46	40.486
11	Francesca Lollobrigida	(Italy)	2:01.90	+4.90	40.633
12	Nikola Zdráhalová	(Czech Republic)	2:03.15	+6.15	41.050
13	Sofie-Karoline Haugen	(Norway)	2:03.50	+6.50	41.166
14	Marina Zueva	(Belarus)	2:03.89	+6.89	41.296
15	Tatyana Mikhailova	(Belarus)	2:04.10	+7.10	41.366
16	Leia Behlau	(Germany)	2:06.46	+9.46	42.153
17	Saskia Alusalu	(Estonia)	2:07.49	+10.49	42.496

==== 5000 metres ====
Rank	Skater	Nat.	Time	Behind	Points
1	Martina Sáblíková	(Czech Republic)	6:58.44		41.844
2	Marije Joling	(Netherlands)	7:10.10	+11.66	43.010
3	Natalya Voronina	(Russia)	7:10.19	+11.75	43.019
4	Ireen Wüst	(Netherlands)	7:10.65	+12.21	43.065
5	Antoinette de Jong	(Netherlands)	7:11.83	+13.39	43.183
6	Olga Graf	(Russia)	7:23.33	+24.89	44.333
7	Ida Njåtun	(Norway)	7:25.92	+27.48	44.592
8	Francesca Lollobrigida	(Italy)	7:38.11	+39.67	45.811

=== Final ranking ===
Rank	Skater	Nat.	500 m	3000 m	1500 m	5000 m	Points	Behind
1st place, gold medalist(s)	Martina Sáblíková	(Czech Republic)	39.98 (4)	4:03.79 (1)	1:57.00 (1)	6:58.44 (1)	161.455	
2nd place, silver medalist(s)	Ireen Wüst	(Netherlands)	39.90 (3)	4:07.32 (3)	1:57.01 (2)	7:10.65 (4)	163.188	+1.74
3rd place, bronze medalist(s)	Antoinette de Jong	(Netherlands)	39.76 (2)	4:09.00 (4)	1:58.80 (4)	7:11.83 (5)	164.043	+2.59
4	Marije Joling	(Netherlands)	40.33 (6)	4:07.14 (2)	1:58.90 (5)	7:10.10 (2)	164.163	+2.71
5	Natalya Voronina	(Russia)	40.46 (8)	4:09.61 (5)	2:01.46 (10)	7:10.19 (3)	165.566	+4.12
6	Ida Njåtun	(Norway)	39.74 (1)	4:10.69 (6)	1:58.51 (3)	7:25.92 (7)	165.616	+4.17
7	Olga Graf	(Russia)	40.57 (11)	4:16.06 (8)	1:59.00 (6)	7:23.33 (6)	167.245	+5.79
8	Francesca Lollobrigida	(Italy)	40.57 (11)	4:15.40 (7)	2:01.90 (11)	7:38.11 (8)	169.580	+8.13
9	Elizaveta Kazelina	(Russia)	40.18 (5)	4:16.13 (9)	2:00.02 (9)		122.874	
10	Luiza Złotkowska	(Poland)	40.47 (9)	4:16.68 (10)	1:59.40 (7)		123.050	
11	Natalia Czerwonka	(Poland)	40.36 (7)	4:18.20 (12)	1:59.57 (8)		123.249	
12	Marina Zueva	(Belarus)	40.54 (10)	4:17.80 (11)	2:03.89 (14)		124.802	
13	Nikola Zdráhalová	(Czech Republic)	40.89 (14)	4:19.54 (13)	2:03.15 (12)		125.196	
14	Sofie-Karoline Haugen	(Norway)	41.07 (15)	4:22.40 (14)	2:03.50 (13)		125.969	
15	Tatyana Mikhailova	(Belarus)	40.63 (13)	4:29.60 (17)	2:04.10 (15)		126.929	
16	Leia Behlau	(Germany)	42.30 (16)	4:27.12 (16)	2:06.46 (16)		128.973	
17	Saskia Alusalu	(Estonia)	43.09 (17)	4:24.31 (15)	2:07.49 (17)		129.637	

== See also ==
- 2016 World Allround Speed Skating Championships
