= 2012 World Allround Speed Skating Championships =

International speed skating competition

World Allround Speed Skating Championships
- 400 meter Ice rink
- Location: Moscow, Russia
- Venue: Krylatskoye Sport Complex
- Dates: 18–19 February

Medalist men
1st place, gold medalist(s)		Sven Kramer	NED
2nd place, silver medalist(s)		Jan Blokhuijsen	NED
3rd place, bronze medalist(s)		Koen Verweij	NED

Medalist women
1st place, gold medalist(s)		Ireen Wüst	NED
2nd place, silver medalist(s)		Martina Sáblíková	CZE
3rd place, bronze medalist(s)		Christine Nesbitt	CAN

The 2012 World Allround Speed Skating Championships took place on 17 and 18 February 2012, at the Krylatskoye Sport Complex in Moscow, Russia.

Defending champions were Ireen Wüst and Ivan Skobrev. Wüst successfully defended her title, and won her third world allround title overall. Sven Kramer became world allround champion for the fifth time, tying the record by Oscar Mathisen and Clas Thunberg.

== Women's championships ==
=== 500 meter ===
Place	Athlete	Country	Time	Points
1	Christine Nesbitt	Canada	38.30	38.300
2	Yekaterina Lobysheva	Russia	38.95	38.950
3	Ireen Wüst	Netherlands	39.36	39.360
4	Miho Takagi	Japan	39.52	39.520
5	Yuliya Skokova	Russia	39.72	39.720
6	Linda de Vries	Netherlands	39.79	39.790
7	Ida Njåtun	Norway	39.87	39.870
8	Brittany Schussler	Canada	39.92	39.920
9	Jilleanne Rookard	United States	39.93	39.930
10	Marrit Leenstra	Netherlands	40.00	40.000
11	Cindy Klassen	Canada	40.02	40.020
12	Hege Bøkko	Norway	40.15	40.150
13	Ayaka Kikuchi	Japan	40.16	40.160
14	Martina Sáblíková	Czech Republic	40.31	40.310
15	Claudia Pechstein	Germany	40.32	40.320
16	Jorien Voorhuis	Netherlands	40.33	40.330
17	Olga Graf	Russia	40.38	40.380
18	Natalia Czerwonka	Poland	40.40	40.400
19	Shiho Ishizawa	Japan	40.54	40.540
20	Katarzyna Woźniak	Poland	40.72	40.720
21	Park Do-yeong	South Korea	41.58	41.580
22	Maria Lamb	United States	41.62	41.620
23	Nicole Garrido	Canada	41.64	41.640
24	Isabell Ost	Germany	41.75	41.750

Source: live.ISUresults.eu

=== 3000 meter ===
Place	Athlete	Country	Time	Points
1	Martina Sáblíková	Czech Republic	4:01.80	40.300
2	Ireen Wüst	Netherlands	4:02.69	40.448
3	Linda de Vries	Netherlands	4:07.06	41.176
4	Claudia Pechstein	Germany	4:07.14	41.190
5	Cindy Klassen	Canada	4:07.50	41.250
6	Christine Nesbitt	Canada	4:09.55	41.591
7	Brittany Schussler	Canada	4:09.82	41.636
8	Ida Njåtun	Norway	4:11.02	41.836
9	Park Do-yeong	South Korea	4:11.91	41.985
10	Jilleanne Rookard	United States	4:12.22	42.036
11	Jorien Voorhuis	Netherlands	4:12.47	42.078
12	Natalia Czerwonka	Poland	4:12.77	42.128
13	Yekaterina Lobysheva	Russia	4:13.39	42.231
14	Ayaka Kikuchi	Japan	4:13.64	42.273
15	Isabell Ost	Germany	4:13.66	42.276
16	Shiho Ishizawa	Japan	4:14.40	42.400
17	Miho Takagi	Japan	4:14.92	42.486
18	Marrit Leenstra	Netherlands	4:15.33	42.555
19	Hege Bøkko	Norway	4:15.36	42.560
20	Olga Graf	Russia	4:15.84	42.640
21	Katarzyna Woźniak	Poland	4:16.04	42.673
22	Nicole Garrido	Canada	4:16.66	42.776
23	Yuliya Skokova	Russia	4:18.48	43.080
24	Maria Lamb	United States	4:28.54	44.756

Source: live.ISUresults.eu

=== 1500 meter ===
Place	Athlete	Country	Time	Points
1	Christine Nesbitt	Canada	1:55.95	38.650
2	Ireen Wüst	Netherlands	1:56.98	38.993
3	Cindy Klassen	Canada	1:57.61	39.203
4	Martina Sáblíková	Czech Republic	1:58.16	39.386
5	Ida Njåtun	Norway	1:58.26	39.420
6	Marrit Leenstra	Netherlands	1:58.43	39.476
7	Linda de Vries	Netherlands	1:58.86	39.620
8	Jorien Voorhuis	Netherlands	1:59.03	39.676
9	Claudia Pechstein	Germany	1:59.20	39.733
10	Olga Graf	Russia	1:59.44	39.813
11	Brittany Schussler	Canada	1:59.49	39.830
12	Yuliya Skokova	Russia	1:59.53	39.843
13	Hege Bøkko	Norway	2:00.02	40.006
14	Miho Takagi	Japan	2:00.29	40.096
15	Yekaterina Lobysheva	Russia	2:00.39	40.130
16	Natalia Czerwonka	Poland	2:00.89	40.296
17	Jilleanne Rookard	United States	2:01.16	40.386
18	Ayaka Kikuchi	Japan	2:01.78	40.593
19	Katarzyna Woźniak	Poland	2:02.32	40.773
20	Isabell Ost	Germany	2:02.34	40.780
21	Nicole Garrido	Canada	2:02.90	40.966
22	Park Do-yeong	South Korea	2:03.10	41.033
23	Shiho Ishizawa	Japan	2:03.14	41.046
24	Maria Lamb	United States	2:06.12	42.040

Source: live.ISUresults.eu

=== 5000 meter ===
Place	Athlete	Country	Time	Points
1	Martina Sáblíková	Czech Republic	6:58.74	41.874
2	Ireen Wüst	Netherlands	7:02.39	42.239
3	Linda de Vries	Netherlands	7:08.09	42.809
4	Cindy Klassen	Canada	7:09.23	42.923
5	Claudia Pechstein	Germany	7:11.08	43.108
6	Park Do-yeong	South Korea	7:13.64	43.364
7	Jorien Voorhuis	Netherlands	7:14.86	43.486
8	Christine Nesbitt	Canada	7:18.19	43.819
9	Brittany Schussler	Canada	7:19.59	43.959
10	Ida Njåtun	Norway	7:19.62	43.962
11	Yekaterina Lobysheva	Russia	7:26.30	44.630
12	Jilleanne Rookard	United States	7:31.28	45.128

Source: live.ISUresults.eu

=== Allround Results ===
Place	Athlete	Country	500m	3000m	1500m	5000m	Points
1st place, gold medalist(s)	Ireen Wüst	Netherlands	39.36 (3)	4:02.69 (2)	1:56.98 (2)	7:02.39 (2)	161.050
2nd place, silver medalist(s)	Martina Sáblíková	Czech Republic	40.31 (14)	4:01.80 (1)	1:58.16 (4)	6:58.74 (1)	161.870
3rd place, bronze medalist(s)	Christine Nesbitt	Canada	38.30 (1)	4:09.55 (6)	1:55.95 (1)	7:18.19 (8)	162.360
4	Linda de Vries	Netherlands	39.79 (6)	4:07.06 (3)	1:58.86 (7)	7:08.09 (3)	163.395
5	Cindy Klassen	Canada	40.02 (11)	4:07.50 (5)	1:57.61 (3)	7:09.23 (4)	163.396
6	Claudia Pechstein	Germany	40.32 (15)	4:07.14 (4)	1:59.20 (9)	7:11.08 (5)	164.351
7	Ida Njåtun	Norway	39.87 (7)	4:11.02 (8)	1:58.26 (5)	7:19.62 (10)	165.088
8	Brittany Schussler	Canada	39.92 (8)	4:09.82 (7)	1:59.49 (11)	7:19.59 (9)	165.345
9	Jorien Voorhuis	Netherlands	40.33 (16)	4:12.47 (11)	1:59.03 (8)	7:14.86 (7)	165.570
10	Yekaterina Lobysheva	Russia	38.95 (2)	4:13.39 (13)	2:00.39 (15)	7:26.30 (11)	165.941
11	Jilleanne Rookard	United States	39.93 (9)	4:12.22 (10)	2:01.16 (17)	7:31.28 (12)	167.480
12	Park Do-yeong	South Korea	41.58 (21)	4:11.91 (9)	2:03.10 (22)	7:13.64 (6)	167.962
NQ13	Marrit Leenstra	Netherlands	40.00 (10)	4:15.33 (18)	1:58.43 (6)		122.031
NQ14	Miho Takagi	Japan	39.52 (4)	4:14.92 (17)	2:00.29 (14)		122.102
NQ15	Yuliya Skokova	Russia	39.72 (5)	4:18.48 (23)	1:59.53 (12)		122.643
NQ16	Hege Bøkko	Norway	40.15 (12)	4:15.36 (19)	2:00.02 (13)		122.716
NQ17	Natalia Czerwonka	Poland	40.40 (18)	4:12.77 (12)	2:00.89 (16)		122.824
NQ18	Olga Graf	Russia	40.38 (17)	4:15.84 (20)	1:59.44 (10)		122.833
NQ19	Ayaka Kikuchi	Japan	40.16 (13)	4:13.64 (14)	2:01.78 (18)		123.026
NQ20	Shiho Ishizawa	Japan	40.54 (19)	4:14.40 (16)	2:03.14 (23)		123.986
NQ21	Katarzyna Woźniak	Poland	40.72 (20)	4:16.04 (21)	2:02.32 (19)		124.166
NQ22	Isabell Ost	Germany	41.75 (24)	4:13.66 (15)	2:02.34 (20)		124.806
NQ23	Nicole Garrido	Canada	41.64 (23)	4:16.66 (22)	2:02.90 (21)		125.382
NQ24	Maria Lamb	United States	41.62 (22)	4:28.54 (24)	2:06.12 (24)		128.416

NQ = Not qualified for the 5000m (only the best 12 are qualified)
Note: Marrit Leenstra did qualify for the 5000m but withdrew, Jilleanne Rookard took her place
Source: live.ISUresults.eu

== Men's championships ==
=== 500 meter ===
Place	Athlete	Country	Time	Points
1	Zbigniew Bródka	Poland	36.24	36.240
2	Koen Verweij	Netherlands	36.26	36.260
3	Konrad Niedźwiedzki	Poland	36.32	36.320
4	Haralds Silovs	Latvia	36.42	36.420
5	Håvard Bøkko	Norway	36.47	36.470
6	Jan Szymański	Poland	36.52	36.520
7	Jan Blokhuijsen	Netherlands	36.56	36.560
8	Sven Kramer	Netherlands	36.70	36.700
9	Lucas Makowsky	Canada	36.81	36.810
10	Jonathan Kuck	United States	36.90	36.900
11	Sverre Lunde Pedersen	Norway	37.02	37.020
12	Ivan Skobrev	Russia	37.05	37.050
13	Alexis Contin	France	37.14	37.140
14	Joshua Wood	United States	37.26	37.260
15	Ted-Jan Bloemen	Netherlands	37.32	37.320
16	Lee Seung-hoon	South Korea	37.36	37.360
17	Bart Swings	Belgium	37.55	37.550
18	Justin Warsylewicz	Canada	37.65	37.650
19	Stefan Waples	Canada	37.79	37.790
20	Patrick Beckert	Germany	37.95	37.950
21	Hiroki Hirako	Japan	38.21	38.210
21	Shane Dobbin	New Zealand	38.21	38.210
23	Jordan Belchos	Canada	38.48	38.480
24	Patrick Meek	United States	39.26	39.260

Source: live.ISUresults.eu

=== 5000 meter ===
Place	Athlete	Country	Time	Points
1	Sven Kramer	Netherlands	6:14.23	37.423
2	Jan Blokhuijsen	Netherlands	6:16.99	37.699
3	Ivan Skobrev	Russia	6:19.78	37.978
4	Koen Verweij	Netherlands	6:20.70	38.070
5	Håvard Bøkko	Norway	6:22.21	38.221
6	Alexis Contin	France	6:24.69	38.469
7	Sverre Lunde Pedersen	Norway	6:26.04	38.604
8	Jonathan Kuck	United States	6:27.15	38.715
9	Haralds Silovs	Latvia	6:28.26	38.826
10	Patrick Beckert	Germany	6:29.40	38.940
11	Bart Swings	Belgium	6:29.62	38.962
12	Lee Seung-hoon	South Korea	6:31.89	39.189
13	Shane Dobbin	New Zealand	6:31.95	39.195
14	Ted-Jan Bloemen	Netherlands	6:32.83	39.283
15	Jan Szymański	Poland	6:38.54	39.854
16	Hiroki Hirako	Japan	6:39.86	39.986
17	Konrad Niedźwiedzki	Poland	6:41.36	40.136
18	Zbigniew Bródka	Poland	6:41.43	40.143
19	Jordan Belchos	Canada	6:42.61	40.261
20	Patrick Meek	United States	6:42.63	40.263
21	Lucas Makowsky	Canada	6:43.15	40.315
22	Stefan Waples	Canada	6:48.36	40.836
23	Justin Warsylewicz	Canada	6:50.47	41.047
24	Joshua Wood	United States	6:52.83	41.283

Source: live.ISUresults.eu

=== 1500 meter ===
Place	Athlete	Country	Time	Points
1	Håvard Bøkko	Norway	1:46.82	35.606
2	Ivan Skobrev	Russia	1:46.94	35.646
3	Jan Blokhuijsen	Netherlands	1:47.22	35.740
4	Sven Kramer	Netherlands	1:47.30	35.766
5	Sverre Lunde Pedersen	Norway	1:47.45	35.816
6	Koen Verweij	Netherlands	1:47.67	35.890
7	Haralds Silovs	Latvia	1:47.94	35.980
8	Konrad Niedźwiedzki	Poland	1:48.10	36.033
9	Zbigniew Bródka	Poland	1:48.11	36.036
10	Bart Swings	Belgium	1:48.38	36.126
11	Jonathan Kuck	United States	1:48.41	36.136
12	Jan Szymański	Poland	1:48.90	36.300
13	Patrick Beckert	Germany	1:49.31	36.436
14	Ted-Jan Bloemen	Netherlands	1:49.71	36.570
15	Lee Seung-hoon	South Korea	1:50.56	36.853
16	Lucas Makowsky	Canada	1:51.17	37.056
17	Shane Dobbin	New Zealand	1:51.82	37.273
18	Justin Warsylewicz	Canada	1:51.88	37.293
19	Joshua Wood	United States	1:52.21	37.403
20	Jordan Belchos	Canada	1:52.23	37.410
21	Stefan Waples	Canada	1:53.28	37.760
22	Patrick Meek	United States	1:53.52	37.840
23	Hiroki Hirako	Japan	1:59.81	39.936
24	Alexis Contin	France	DQ	-

Source: live.ISUresults.eu

=== 10000 meter ===
Place	Athlete	Country	Time	Points
1	Sven Kramer	Netherlands	13:08.76	39.438
2	Jan Blokhuijsen	Netherlands	13:12.31	39.615
3	Ivan Skobrev	Russia	13:13.16	39.658
4	Håvard Bøkko	Norway	13:16.75	39.837
5	Koen Verweij	Netherlands	13:17.31	39.865
6	Jonathan Kuck	United States	13:30.88	40.544
7	Sverre Lunde Pedersen	Norway	13:43.01	41.150
8	Haralds Silovs	Latvia	13:43.66	41.183
9	Bart Swings	Belgium	13:46.23	41.311
10	Patrick Beckert	Germany	13:47.32	41.366
11	Zbigniew Bródka	Poland	14:11.40	42.570
12	Konrad Niedźwiedzki	Poland	14:25.67	43.283

Source: live.ISUresults.eu

=== Allround results ===
Place	Athlete	Country	500 m	5000 m	1500 m	10000 m	Points
1st place, gold medalist(s)	Sven Kramer	Netherlands	36.70 (8)	6:14.23 (1)	1:47.30 (4)	13:08.76 (1)	149.327
2nd place, silver medalist(s)	Jan Blokhuijsen	Netherlands	36.56 (7)	6:16.99 (2)	1:47.22 (3)	13:12.31 (2)	149.614
3rd place, bronze medalist(s)	Koen Verweij	Netherlands	36.26 (2)	6:20.70 (4)	1:47.67 (6)	13:17.31 (5)	150.085
4	Håvard Bøkko	Norway	36.47 (5)	6:22.21 (5)	1:46.82 (1)	13:16.75 (4)	150.134
5	Ivan Skobrev	Russia	37.05 (12)	6:19.78 (3)	1:46.94 (2)	13:13.16 (3)	150.332
6	Jonathan Kuck	United States	36.90 (10)	6:27.15 (8)	1:48.41 (11)	13:30.88 (6)	152.295
7	Haralds Silovs	Latvia	36.42 (4)	6:28.26 (9)	1:47.94 (7)	13:43.66 (8)	152.409
8	Sverre Lunde Pedersen	Norway	37.02 (11)	6:26.04 (7)	1:47.45 (5)	13:43.01 (7)	152.590
9	Bart Swings	Belgium	37.55 (17)	6:29.62 (11)	1:48.38 (10)	13:46.23 (9)	153.949
10	Patrick Beckert	Germany	37.95 (20)	6:29.40 (10)	1:49.31 (13)	13:47.32 (10)	154.692
11	Zbigniew Bródka	Poland	36.24 (1)	6:41.43 (18)	1:48.11 (9)	14:11.40 (11)	154.989
12	Konrad Niedźwiedzki	Poland	36.32 (3)	6:41.36 (17)	1:48.10 (8)	14:25.67 (12)	155.772
NQ13	Jan Szymański	Poland	36.52 (6)	6:38.54 (15)	1:48.90 (12)		112.674
NQ14	Ted-Jan Bloemen	Netherlands	37.32 (15)	6:32.83 (14)	1:49.71 (14)		113.173
NQ15	Lee Seung-hoon	South Korea	37.36 (16)	6:31.89 (12)	1:50.56 (15)		113.402
NQ16	Lucas Makowsky	Canada	36.81 (9)	6:43.15 (21)	1:51.17 (16)		114.181
NQ17	Shane Dobbin	New Zealand	38.21 (21)	6:31.95 (13)	1:51.82 (17)		114.678
NQ18	Joshua Wood	United States	37.26 (14)	6:52.83 (24)	1:52.21 (19)		115.946
NQ19	Justin Warsylewicz	Canada	37.65 (18)	6:50.47 (23)	1:51.88 (18)		115.990
NQ20	Jordan Belchos	Canada	38.48 (23)	6:42.61 (19)	1:52.23 (20)		116.151
NQ21	Stefan Waples	Canada	37.79 (19)	6:48.36 (22)	1:53.28 (21)		116.386
NQ22	Patrick Meek	United States	39.26 (24)	6:42.63 (20)	1:53.52 (22)		117.363
NQ23	Hiroki Hirako	Japan	38.21 (21)	6:39.86 (16)	1:59.81 (23)		118.132
NQ24	Alexis Contin	France	37.14 (13)	6:24.69 (6)	DQ (24)		75.609

NQ = Not qualified for the 10000 m (only the best 12 are qualified)
DQ = disqualified
Source: live.ISUresults.eu

== Rules ==
All 24 participating skaters are allowed to skate the first three distances; 12 skaters may take part on the fourth distance. These 12 skaters are determined by taking the standings on the longest of the first three distances, as well as the samalog standings after three distances, and comparing these lists as follows:

1. Skaters among the top 12 on both lists are qualified.
2. To make up a total of 12, skaters are then added in order of their best rank on either list. Samalog standings take precedence over the longest-distance standings in the event of a tie.
