= Speed skating at the 2018 Winter Olympics – Men's team pursuit =

Men's team pursuit at the XXIII Olympic Winter Games
- Venue: Gangneung Oval, Gangneung, South Korea
- Date: 18 February 2018 (quarterfinals); 21 February 2018 (semifinals, finals)
- Competitors: 29 from 8 nations
- Winning time: 3:37.32

Medalists
1st place, gold medalist(s)		Håvard Bøkko; Simen Spieler Nilsen; Sverre Lunde Pedersen; Sindre Henriksen	Norway
2nd place, silver medalist(s)		Lee Seung-hoon; Chung Jae-won; Kim Min-seok	South Korea
3rd place, bronze medalist(s)		Patrick Roest; Jan Blokhuijsen; Sven Kramer; Koen Verweij	Netherlands

The men's team pursuit speed skating competition of the 2018 Winter Olympics was held on 18 and 21 February 2018 at Gangneung Oval in Gangneung

== Records ==
Prior to this competition, the existing world, Olympic and track records were as follows.

World record	Netherlands; Koen Verweij; Jan Blokhuijsen; Sven Kramer	3:35.60	Salt Lake City, United States	16 November 2013
Olympic record	Netherlands; Jan Blokhuijsen; Sven Kramer; Koen Verweij	3:37.71	Sochi, Russia	22 February 2014
Track record	Netherlands; Jorrit Bergsma; Jan Blokhuijsen; Douwe de Vries	3:40.66		10 February 2017

The following records were set during this competition.

Date	Round	Athlete	Country	Time	Record
18 February	Quarterfinal 1	Sindre Henriksen; Simen Spieler Nilsen; Sverre Lunde Pedersen	Norway	3:40.09	TR
18 February	Quarterfinal 2	Chung Jae-won; Kim Min-seok; Lee Seung-hoon	South Korea	3:39.29	TR
21 February	Semifinal 1	Chung Jae-won; Kim Min-seok; Lee Seung-hoon	South Korea	3:38.82	TR
21 February	Semifinal 2	Håvard Bøkko; Simen Spieler Nilsen; Sverre Lunde Pedersen	Norway	3:37.08	OR; WB (sea level); TR

== Results ==
=== Quarterfinals ===
Although these races are called quarterfinals, no direct elimination is used but the teams are ranked by time, with the top four teams progressing to the semifinals.

The quarterfinals were held on 18 February at 20:00.

Rank	Heat	Country	Name	Time	Notes
1	2	South Korea	Chung Jae-won; Kim Min-seok; Lee Seung-hoon	3:39.29; TR	Semifinal 1
2	4	Netherlands	Jan Blokhuijsen; Sven Kramer; Koen Verweij	3:40.03	Semifinal 2
3	1	Norway	Sindre Henriksen; Simen Spieler Nilsen; Sverre Lunde Pedersen	3:40.09; TR	Semifinal 2
4	1	New Zealand	Shane Dobbin; Reyon Kay; Peter Michael	3:41.18	Semifinal 1
5	3	Japan	Seitaro Ichinohe; Shota Nakamura; Shane Williamson	3:41.62	Final C
6	2	Italy	Riccardo Bugari; Andrea Giovannini; Nicola Tumolero	3:41.64	Final C
7	3	Canada	Jordan Belchos; Ted-Jan Bloemen; Denny Morrison	3:41.73	Final D
8	4	United States	Brian Hansen; Emery Lehman; Joey Mantia	3:42.98	Final D

TR = track record

=== Semifinals ===
The semifinals were held on 21 February at 20:22.

Rank	Country	Name	Time	Deficit	Notes
Semifinal 1
1	South Korea	Chung Jae-won; Kim Min-seok; Lee Seung-hoon	3:38.82; TR		Final A
2	New Zealand	Shane Dobbin; Reyon Kay; Peter Michael	3:39.53	+0.71	Final B
Semifinal 2
1	Norway	Håvard Bøkko; Simen Spieler Nilsen; Sverre Lunde Pedersen	3:37.08; OR, TR		Final A
2	Netherlands	Jan Blokhuijsen; Sven Kramer; Patrick Roest	3:38.46	+1.38	Final B

=== Finals ===
The finals were held on 21 February at 21:13.

Rank	Country	Name	Time	Deficit	Notes
Final A
1st place, gold medalist(s)	Norway	Håvard Bøkko; Simen Spieler Nilsen; Sverre Lunde Pedersen	3:37.32		
2nd place, silver medalist(s)	South Korea	Chung Jae-won; Kim Min-seok; Lee Seung-hoon	3:38.52	+1.20	
Final B
3rd place, bronze medalist(s)	Netherlands	Jan Blokhuijsen; Sven Kramer; Patrick Roest	3:38.40		
4	New Zealand	Shane Dobbin; Reyon Kay; Peter Michael	3:43.54	+5.14	
Final C
5	Japan	Seitaro Ichinohe; Ryosuke Tsuchiya; Shane Williamson	3:41.62		
6	Italy	Riccardo Bugari; Andrea Giovannini; Nicola Tumolero	DSQ		R 256.3
Final D
7	Canada	Ted-Jan Bloemen; Ben Donnelly; Denny Morrison	3:42.16		
8	United States	Jonathan Garcia; Brian Hansen; Emery Lehman	3:50.77	+8.61	
