= Jan Blokhuijsen =

Dutch speed skater

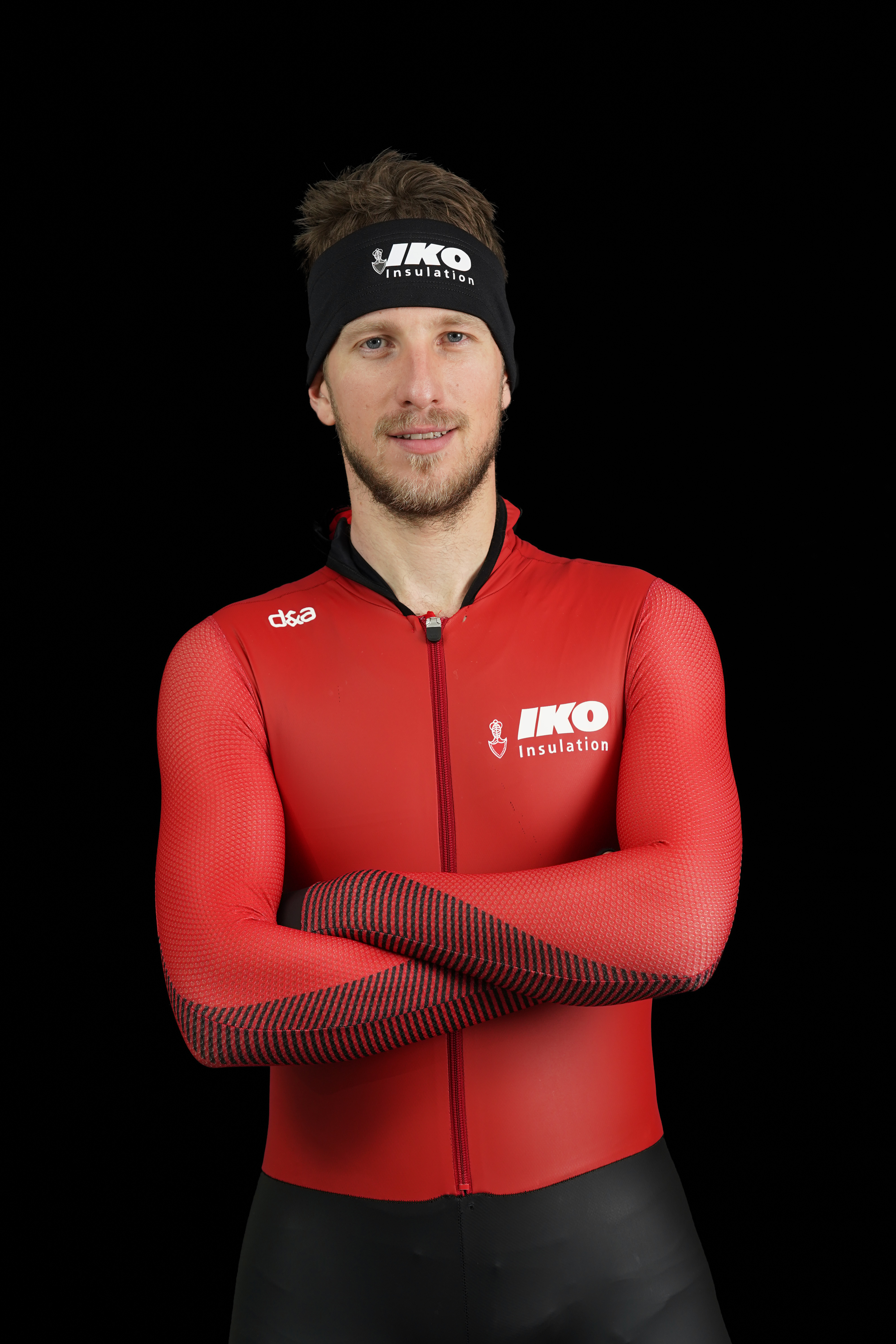
- Blokhuijsen in 2020

Personal information
- Born: 1 April 1989 (age 37) Zuid-Scharwoude, Netherlands
- Height: 1.84 m (6 ft 0 in)
- Weight: 81 kg (179 lb)

Sport
- Country: Netherlands
- Sport: Speed skating
- Turned pro: 2007
Medal record
Olympic Games
Gold medal – first place	2014 Sochi	Team pursuit
Silver medal – second place	2014 Sochi	5000 m
Bronze medal – third place	2010 Vancouver	Team pursuit
Bronze medal – third place	2018 Pyeongchang	Team pursuit
World Allround Championships
Silver medal – second place	2012 Moscow	Allround
Silver medal – second place	2014 Heerenveen	Allround
Bronze medal – third place	2011 Calgary	Allround
Bronze medal – third place	2016 Berlin	Allround
Bronze medal – third place	2017 Hamar	Allround
World Single Distance Championships
Gold medal – first place	2012 Heerenveen	Team pursuit
Gold medal – first place	2013 Sochi	Team pursuit
Gold medal – first place	2016 Kolomna	Team pursuit
Gold medal – first place	2017 Gangneung	Team pursuit
Bronze medal – third place	2011 Inzell	Team pursuit
European Allround Championships
Gold medal – first place	2014 Hamar	Allround
Silver medal – second place	2011 Collalbo	Allround
Silver medal – second place	2012 Budapest	Allround
Silver medal – second place	2013 Heerenveen	Allround
Silver medal – second place	2017 Heerenveen	Allround
Bronze medal – third place	2016 Minsk	Allround
European Single Distance Championships
Gold medal – first place	2018 Kolomna	Team pursuit
Gold medal – first place	2018 Kolomna	Mass start

Jan Blokhuijsen (Dutch pronunciation: [jɑm ˈblɔkˌɦœyzə(n)]; born 1 April 1989) is an Olympic award-winning Dutch long-track speed skater who until 2013 skated for the commercial TVM team.

== Career ==
In 2007, Blokhuijsen got his VWO degree at school. After a successful period in skating and inline skating (in which he won several Dutch and European titles at the junior categories and a second place at the world championships in Korea) he decided to focus only on speedskating. In February 2008, he won the Dutch Allround Speed Skating Championships junior title at the ice rink of Groningen. Later in the same month, he became world champion at the junior world championships speedskating, where he finished in front of his teammates Koen Verweij and Berden de Vries. Together with them he also won the world title at the team pursuit.

Blokhuijsen held the world record in the team pursuit discipline, along with teammates Sven Kramer and Koen Verweij. At the 2014 Winter Olympics in Sochi, he won a silver medal in the Men's 5000 m competition. At the 2014 European allround championships in Hamar, Blokhuijsen won his first European title.

== Controversy ==
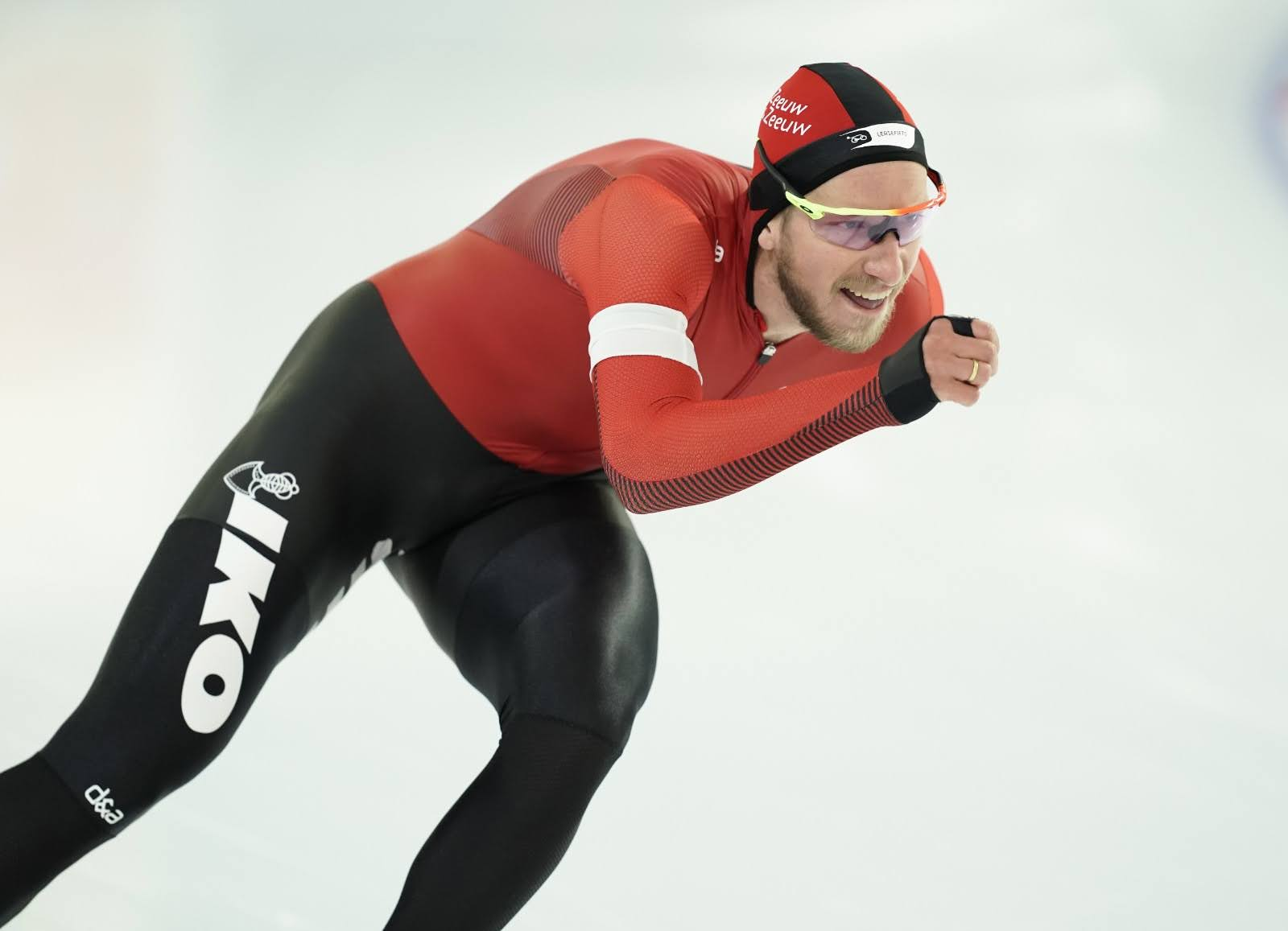
Blokhuijsen in 2020

After the team pursuit event at the 2018 Winter Olympics in Pyeongchang, Blokhuijsen made a comment during a press conference to the host South Koreans to "treat dogs better in this country", criticizing dog meat consumption in the host nation. Many South Koreans perceived his comment was disrespectful, claiming it was racist and ignorant of Korean culture and the declining dog meat custom in the country. He later gave an apology for this comment on Twitter, which he deleted later.

== Records ==
=== Personal records ===
Personal records
Men's speed skating
Event	Result	Date	Location	Notes
500 meter	35.59	12 February 2011	Calgary	World Allround Championships
1000 meter	1:09.11	25 November 2017	Calgary	Time trials
1500 meter	1:43.78	13 February 2011	Calgary	World Allround Championships
3000 meter	3:38.89	19 December 2017	Heerenveen	Training race
5000 meter	6:11.91	10 November 2013	Calgary	World Cup
10000 meter	12:57.58	28 December 2013	Heerenveen	Qualification tournament
Big combination	146.603	11 November 2013	Calgary	World Allround Championships; National record until 8 March 2015
Team pursuit	3:35.60	16 November 2013	Salt Lake City	With Sven Kramer and Koen Verweij

As of 10 March 2020, Blokhuijsen is in 11th position in the adelskalender with a score of 146.253 points. Between 13 February 2011 and 11 October 2013 he held a personal best 6th place.

=== World records ===
Event	Time	Date	Location	Note
Team pursuit	*3:37.17	9 November 2013	Calgary	World record until 16 November 2013
Team pursuit	*3:35.60	16 November 2013	Salt Lake City	World record until 15 February 2020

* together with Sven Kramer and Koen Verweij

== Tournament overview ==
Season	Dutch Championships Single Distances	Dutch Championships Allround	European Championships Allround	World Championships Allround	World Championships Single Distances	Olympic Games	World Cup GWC	World Championships Junior Allround
2006–07								INNSBRUCK (gold) Team pursuit
2007–08	HEERENVEEN 12th 1500m 13th 5000m	GRONINGEN (silver) 500m 12th 5000m 11th 1500m 11th 10000m 8th overall						CHANGCHUN 4th 500m (gold) 3000m (gold) 1500m (silver) 5000m (gold) overall (gold) Team pursuit
2008–09	HEERENVEEN 14th 1500m 19th 5000m	HEERENVEEN 5th 500m 10th 5000m 14th 1500m 9th 10000m 8th overall						
2009–10	HEERENVEEN 7th 1500m 6th 5000m		HAMAR 7th 500m 4th 5000m 17th 1500m 4th 10,000m 5th overall	HEERENVEEN 9th 500m 7th 5000m 10th 1500m 6th 10000m 5th overall		VANCOUVER 9th 5000m (bronze) Team pursuit	10th 5000/10000m (silver) Team pursuit	
2010–11	HEERENVEEN 9th 1500m 8th 5000m DQ 10000m	HEERENVEEN (silver) 500m (bronze) 5000m 5th 1500m 4th 10000m (bronze) overall	COLLALBO (silver) 500m 4th 5000m 5th 1500m (bronze) 10000m (silver) overall	CALGARY 4th 500m 4th 5000m 6th 1500m (bronze) 10000m (bronze) overall	INZELL DQ 5000m (bronze) Team pursuit		16th 5000/10000m 8th Team pursuit	
2011–12	HEERENVEEN 6th 1500m 4th 5000m 5th 10000m		BUDAPEST (bronze) 500m (silver) 5000m (bronze) 1500m (silver) 10000m (silver) overall	MOSCOW 7th 500m (silver) 5000m (bronze) 1500m (silver) 10000m (silver) overall	HEERENVEEN 4th 5000m (gold) Team pursuit		6th 5000/10000m (gold) Team pursuit	
2012–13	HEERENVEEN 10th 1500m (silver) 5000m (bronze) 10000m	HEERENVEEN (silver) 500m (silver) 5000m (silver) 1500m (bronze) 10000m (silver) overall	HEERENVEEN 4th 500m (silver) 5000m 10th 1500m (silver) 10000m (silver) overall	HAMAR 8th 500m 8th 5000m 13th 1500m DNQ 10000m NC overall	SOCHI (gold) Team pursuit		5th 5000/10000m (gold) Team pursuit	
2013–14	HEERENVEEN 6th 1500m 4th 5000m 4th 10000m		HAMAR 7th 500m (gold) 5000m 9th 1500m (gold) 10000m (gold) overall	HEERENVEEN 7th 500m (gold) 5000m 6th 1500m (gold) 10000m (silver) overall		SOCHI 13th 1500m (silver) 5000m (gold) Team pursuit	32nd 1500m 5th 5000/10000m (gold) Team pursuit	
2014–15	HEERENVEEN 8th 1500m DNF 5000m DNF 10000m	HEERENVEEN (bronze) 500m 11th 5000m 16th 1500m DNQ 10000m NC overall(9th)						
2015–16	HEERENVEEN 7th 1500m 6th 5000m	HEERENVEEN (silver) 500m (gold) 5000m (silver) 1500m (silver) 10000m (gold) overall	MINSK 5th 500m (silver) 5000m 9th 1500m (bronze) 10000m (bronze) overall	BERLIN 6th 500m (bronze) 5000m 6th 1500m (silver) 10000m (bronze) overall	KOLOMNA (gold) Team pursuit		24th 1500m (gold) Team pursuit	
2016–17	HEERENVEEN 7th 1500m 4th 5000m 6th 10000m	HEERENVEEN (bronze) 500m (gold) 5000m (silver) 1500m (silver) 10000m (gold) overall	HEERENVEEN (silver) 500m (silver) 5000m 7th 1500m (silver) 10000m (silver) overall	HAMAR 6th 500m (bronze) 5000m 15th 1500m (silver) 10000m (bronze) overall	GANGNEUNG (gold) Team pursuit		40th 1500m 25th 5000m (gold) Team pursuit	
2017–18	HEERENVEEN 7th 1500m 5th 5000m 4th 10000m					GANGNEUNG 7th 5000m (bronze) Team pursuit	17th 5000m 7th Team pursuit	
2018–19								
2019–20	HEERENVEEN DQ 1500m 6th 5000m 4th 10000m (bronze) Mass start	HEERENVEEN 4th 500m (gold) 5000m (gold) 1500m (silver) 10000m (gold) overall		HAMAR 8th 500m 7th 5000m 4th 1500m 5th 10000m 4th overall			47th 5000m	
2020–21	HEERENVEEN 12th 1500m 6th 5000m	HEERENVEEN 4th 500m 5th 5000m DQ 1500m DNQ 10000m NC overall						
2021–22	HEERENVEEN 5th 1500m 9th 5000m (silver) Mass start	HEERENVEEN 3rd 500m 6th 5000m DNS 1500m DNS 10000m NC overall						

== World Cup overview ==
Season	1500 meter					
2009–2010						
2010–2011						
2011–2012						
2012–2013						
2013–2014	–	–	–	2nd(b)	–	–
2014–2015						
2015–2016						
2016–2017	–	–	5th(b)	–	–	–
2017–2018						
2018–2019						
2019–2020						

Season	5000/10000 meter					
2009–2010	–	1st(b)	–*	1st(b)	–*	4th
2010–2011	–	–	–*	4th –*	8th	
2011–2012	8th	5th	–*	3rd place, bronze medalist(s)	–*	4th
2012–2013	3rd place, bronze medalist(s)	2nd place, silver medalist(s)	7th*	7th	–*	5th
2013–2014	6th	12th	–*	2nd place, silver medalist(s)	–	2nd place, silver medalist(s)
2014–2015						
2015–2016						
2016–2017	–	–	1st(b)	–*	–	–
2017–2018	4th	–	7th	–	–	–
2018–2019						
2019–2020	–	11th(b)	–	–	–	–

Season	Team pursuit				
2009–2010	1st place, gold medalist(s)	1st place, gold medalist(s)	–	4th	
2010–2011	–	–	DQ		
2011–2012	1st place, gold medalist(s)	1st place, gold medalist(s)	–		
2012–2013	1st place, gold medalist(s)	1st place, gold medalist(s)	–	1st place, gold medalist(s)	
2013–2014	1st place, gold medalist(s)	1st place, gold medalist(s)	1st place, gold medalist(s)	1st place, gold medalist(s)	
2014–2015					
2015–2016	DNF	1st place, gold medalist(s)	1st place, gold medalist(s)	1st place, gold medalist(s)	
2016–2017	–	–	DQ	2nd place, silver medalist(s)	–
2017–2018	10th	1st place, gold medalist(s)	–	–	
2018–2019					
2019–2020					

– = Did not participate
* = 10000 meter
(b) = Division B
DNF = Did not finish
DQ = Disqualified

== Medals won ==
Championship	Gold (gold)	Silver (silver)	Bronze (bronze)
Dutch Single Distances	0	1	2
Dutch Allround	7	12	5
European Allround	3	13	5
World Allround	2	6	7
World Single Distances	4	0	1
Olympic Games	1	1	2
World Cup	20	5	2
World Junior	5	1	0
