= 2016 World Single Distances Speed Skating Championships – Men's team pursuit =

Men's team pursuit at the 2016 World Single Distances Speed Skating Championships
- Venue: Kolomna Speed Skating Center, Kolomna
- Date: 12 February
- Competitors: 24 from 8 nations
- Teams: 8
- Winning time: 3:40.04

Medalists
gold medal	Jan Blokhuijsen; Douwe de Vries; Arjan Stroetinga	Netherlands
silver medal	Håvard Bøkko; Simen Spieler Nilsen; Sverre Lunde Pedersen	Norway
bronze medal	Jordan Belchos; Ted-Jan Bloemen; Benjamin Donnelly	Canada

The Men's team pursuit race of the 2016 World Single Distances Speed Skating Championships was held on 12 February 2016.

== Results ==
The race was started at 20:28.

Rank	Pair	Lane	Country	Time	Diff
1st place, gold medalist(s)	3	c	NED	3:40.04	
2nd place, silver medalist(s)	1	f	NOR	3:41.26	+1.22
3rd place, bronze medalist(s)	1	c	CAN	3:43.28	+3.24
4	3	f	ITA	3:43.29	+3.25
5	4	f	KOR	3:43.77	+3.73
6	2	c	RUS	3:44.81	+4.77
7	2	f	JPN	3:45.07	+5.03
8	4	c	POL	3:47.80	+7.76
