= Riccardo Bugari =

Italian speed skater

Personal information
- Nationality: Italian
- Born: 6 February 1991 (age 35)
- Height: 1.80 m (5 ft 11 in)
- Weight: 71 kg (157 lb)

Sport
- Sport: Speed skating

Riccardo Bugari (born 6 February 1991) is an Italian speed skater. He competed in the 2018 Winter Olympics.
