= 2013 World Allround Speed Skating Championships =

International speed skating competition

World Allround Speed Skating Championships
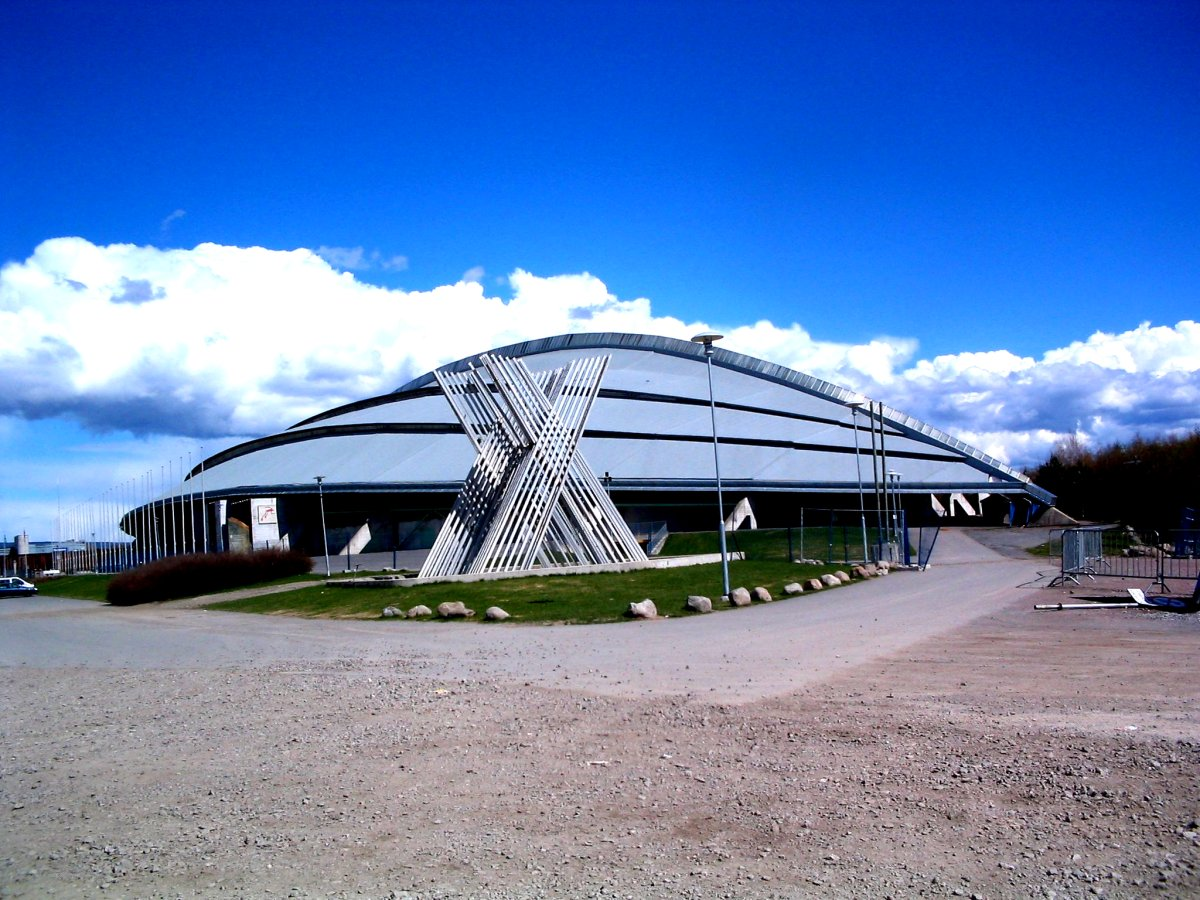
- Location: Hamar, Norway
- Venue: Vikingskipet,
- Dates: 16–17 February
- Competitors: 48 from 16 nations

Medalist men
1st place, gold medalist(s)		Sven Kramer	NED
2nd place, silver medalist(s)		Håvard Bøkko	NOR
3rd place, bronze medalist(s)		Bart Swings	BEL

Medalist women
1st place, gold medalist(s)		Ireen Wüst	NED
2nd place, silver medalist(s)		Diane Valkenburg	NED
3rd place, bronze medalist(s)		Yekaterina Shikhova	RUS

The 2013 World Allround Speed Skating Championships took place between 16 and 17 February 2013, at Vikingskipet in Hamar, Norway.

Sven Kramer won the men's title for a record sixth time. Ireen Wüst won the women's title for the fourth time. Three of the six medalists, including both winners, represented the Netherlands.

== Rules ==
All 24 participating skaters were allowed to skate the first three distances; only 8 skaters took part on the fourth and longest distance. These 8 skaters were determined by taking the standings on the longest of the first three distances, as well as the samalog standings after three distances, and comparing these lists as follows:

1. Skaters among the top 8 on both lists were qualified.
2. To make up a total of 8, skaters were then added in order of their best rank on either list. Samalog standings take precedence over the longest-distance standings in the event of a tie. Skaters trying to qualify by their longest-distance standing have to be in the top 16 of the samalog.

== Schedule ==
All times are local.

Date	Time	Event
16 February	14:00	Women's 500 m
16 February	14:27	Men's 500 m
16 February	15:14	Women's 3000 m
16 February	16:47	Men's 5000 m
17 February	13:10	Women's 1500 m
17 February	14:13	Men's 1500 m
17 February	15:14	Women's 5000 m
17 February	16:10	Men's 10000 m

== Medal winners ==
Event	Gold		Silver		Bronze	
Men	Sven Kramer; Netherlands	149.228	Håvard Bøkko; Norway	149.447	Bart Swings; Belgium	149.800
Women	Ireen Wüst; Netherlands	161.530	Diane Valkenburg; Netherlands	163.120	Yekaterina Shikhova; Russia	163.444

=== Medal table ===
Rank	Nation	Gold	Silver	Bronze	Total
1	Netherlands	2	1	0	3
2	Norway	0	1	0	1
3	Belgium	0	0	1	1
3	Russia	0	0	1	1
Totals (4 entries)		2	2	2	6

== Men ==
=== 500 meter ===
Place	Athlete	Country	Time	Points
1	Zbigniew Bródka	Poland	35.80	35.800
2	Håvard Bøkko	Norway	36.01	36.010
3	Haralds Silovs	Latvia	36.20	36.200
4	Jan Szymański	Poland	36.39	36.390
5	Sun Longjiang	China	36.50	36.500
6	Koen Verweij	Netherlands	36.65	36.650
7	Sverre Lunde Pedersen	Norway	36.66	36.660
8	Jan Blokhuijsen	Netherlands	36.68	36.680
9	Sven Kramer	Netherlands	36.71	36.710
10	Bart Swings	Belgium	36.73	36.730
11	Simen Spieler Nilsen	Norway	36.74	36.740
12	Ivan Skobrev	Russia	36.79	36.790
13	Lucas Makowsky	Canada	36.81	36.810
14	Renz Rotteveel	Netherlands	36.92	36.920
15	Joey Mantia	United States	36.96	36.960
16	Denis Yuskov	Russia	36.97	36.970
17	Dmitry Babenko	Kazakhstan	37.22	37.220
18	Roland Cieslak	Poland	37.41	37.410
18	Jonathan Kuck	United States	37.41	37.410
20	Hiroki Abe	Japan	37.42	37.420
21	Bram Smallenbroek	Austria	37.66	37.660
22	Alec Janssens	Canada	38.14	38.140
23	Marco Cignini	Italy	38.22	38.220
24	Moritz Geisreiter	Germany	38.55	38.550

=== 1500 meter ===
Place	Athlete	Country	Time	Points
1	Håvard Bøkko	Norway	1:46.34	35.446
2	Zbigniew Bródka	Poland	1:46.49	35.496
3	Bart Swings	Belgium	1:46.51	35.503
4	Sven Kramer	Netherlands	1:46.75	35.583
5	Denis Yuskov	Russia	1:46.77	35.590
6	Ivan Skobrev	Russia	1:46.92	35.640
7	Haralds Silovs	Latvia	1:47.11	35.703
8	Sverre Lunde Pedersen	Norway	1:47.15	35.716
9	Koen Verweij	Netherlands	1:47.51	35.836
10	Jan Szymański	Poland	1:48.02	36.006
11	Renz Rotteveel	Netherlands	1:48.39	36.130
12	Jonathan Kuck	United States	1:48.44	36.146
13	Jan Blokhuijsen	Netherlands	1:48.59	36.196
14	Roland Cieslak	Poland	1:49.15	36.383
14	Lucas Makowsky	Canada	1:49.15	36.383
16	Dmitry Babenko	Kazakhstan	1:49.57	36.523
17	Simen Spieler Nilsen	Norway	1:49.71	36.570
18	Moritz Geisreiter	Germany	1:49.93	36.643
19	Alec Janssens	Canada	1:49.99	36.663
20	Hiroki Abe	Japan	1:51.51	37.170
21	Joey Mantia	United States	1:52.32	37.440
22	Sun Longjiang	China	1:52.75	37.583
23	Marco Cignini	Italy	1:53.37	37.790
	Bram Smallenbroek	Austria	WDR	–

=== 5000 meter ===
Place	Athlete	Country	Time	Points
1	Sven Kramer	Netherlands	6:13.42	37.342
2	Ivan Skobrev	Russia	6:19.06	37.906
3	Bart Swings	Belgium	6:19.72	37.972
4	Sverre Lunde Pedersen	Norway	6:20.06	38.006
5	Håvard Bøkko	Norway	6:22.00	38.200
6	Koen Verweij	Netherlands	6:24.35	38.435
7	Renz Rotteveel	Netherlands	6:25.12	38.512
8	Jan Blokhuijsen	Netherlands	6:25.90	38.590
9	Jonathan Kuck	United States	6:27.62	38.762
10	Denis Yuskov	Russia	6:28.23	38.823
11	Moritz Geisreiter	Germany	6:31.13	39.113
12	Haralds Silovs	Latvia	6:32.52	39.252
13	Dmitry Babenko	Kazakhstan	6:34.93	39.493
14	Jan Szymański	Poland	6:35.43	39.543
15	Zbigniew Bródka	Poland	6:35.88	39.588
16	Roland Cieslak	Poland	6:37.71	39.771
17	Alec Janssens	Canada	6:39.87	39.987
18	Hiroki Abe	Japan	6:41.94	40.194
19	Simen Spieler Nilsen	Norway	6:42.07	40.207
20	Marco Cignini	Italy	6:42.76	40.276
21	Lucas Makowsky	Canada	6:46.75	40.675
22	Sun Longjiang	China	6:50.93	41.093
23	Joey Mantia	United States	6:55.19	41.519
	Bram Smallenbroek	Austria	WDR	

=== 10000 meter ===
Place	Athlete	Country	Time	Points
1	Sven Kramer	Netherlands	13:11.86	39.593
2	Bart Swings	Belgium	13:11.91	39.595
3	Håvard Bøkko	Norway	13:15.83	39.791
4	Sverre Lunde Pedersen	Norway	13:25.65	40.282
5	Renz Rotteveel	Netherlands	13:35.84	40.792
6	Ivan Skobrev	Russia	13:35.90	40.795
7	Haralds Silovs	Latvia	13:47.38	41.369
8	Zbigniew Bródka	Poland	14:09.29	42.464

=== Allround results ===
Place	Athlete	Country	500 m	5000 m	1500 m	10000 m	Points
1st place, gold medalist(s)	Sven Kramer	Netherlands	36.71	6:13.42	1:46.75	13:11.86	149.228
2nd place, silver medalist(s)	Håvard Bøkko	Norway	36.01	6:22.00	1:46.34	13:15.83	149.447
3rd place, bronze medalist(s)	Bart Swings	Belgium	36.73	6:19.72	1:46.51	13:11.91	149.800
4	Sverre Lunde Pedersen	Norway	36.66	6:20.06	1:47.15	13:25.65	150.664
5	Ivan Skobrev	Russia	36.79	6:19.06	1:46.92	13:35.90	151.131
6	Renz Rotteveel	Netherlands	36.92	6:25.12	1:48.39	13:35.84	152.354
7	Haralds Silovs	Latvia	36.20	6:32.52	1:47.11	13:47.38	152.524
8	Zbigniew Bródka	Poland	35.80	6:35.88	1:46.49	14:09.29	153.348
9	Koen Verweij	Netherlands	36.65	6:24.35	1:47.51		110.921
10	Denis Yuskov	Russia	36.97	6:28.23	1:46.77		111.383
11	Jan Blokhuijsen	Netherlands	36.68	6:25.89	1:48.59		111.465
12	Jan Szymański	Poland	36.39	6:35.43	1:48.02		111.939
13	Jonathan Kuck	United States	37.41	6:27.62	1:48.44		112.318
14	Dmitry Babenko	Kazakhstan	37.22	6:34.93	1:49.57		113.236
15	Simen Spieler Nilsen	Norway	36.74	6:42.07	1:49.71		113.517
16	Roland Cieslak	Poland	37.41	6:37.71	1:49.15		113.564
17	Lucas Makowsky	Canada	36.81	6:46.75	1:49.15		113.868
18	Moritz Geisreiter	Germany	38.55	6:31.13	1:49.93		114.306
19	Hiroki Abe	Japan	37.42	6:41.94	1:51.51		114.784
20	Alec Janssens	Canada	38.14	6:39.87	1:49.98		114.787
21	Sun Longjiang	China	36.50	6:50.93	1:52.75		115.176
22	Joey Mantia	United States	36.96	6:55.19	1:52.32		115.919
23	Marco Cignini	Italy	38.22	6:42.76	1:53.37		116.286
	Bram Smallenbroek	Austria	37.66	WDR			

== Women ==
=== 500 meter ===
Place	Athlete	Country	Time	Points
1	Christine Nesbitt	Canada	38.60	38.600
2	Ireen Wüst	Netherlands	39.35	39.350
3	Lotte van Beek	Netherlands	39.44	39.440
4	Miho Takagi	Japan	39.53	39.530
5	Yekaterina Shikhova	Russia	39.57	39.570
6	Kali Christ	Canada	39.66	39.660
7	Diane Valkenburg	Netherlands	39.77	39.770
8	Yevgeniya Dmitriyeva	Russia	40.02	40.020
9	Ida Njåtun	Norway	40.03	40.030
10	Brittany Schussler	Canada	40.17	40.170
11	Luiza Złotkowska	Poland	40.40	40.400
12	Linda de Vries	Netherlands	40.44	40.440
13	Anna Ringsred	United States	40.45	40.450
14	Olga Graf	Russia	40.50	40.500
15	Claudia Pechstein	Germany	40.68	40.680
16	Maki Tabata	Japan	40.71	40.710
17	Natalia Czerwonka	Poland	40.82	40.820
18	Francesca Bettrone	Italy	41.05	41.050
19	Katarzyna Woźniak	Poland	41.11	41.110
20	Anna Rokita	Austria	41.34	41.340
21	Maria Lamb	United States	41.43	41.430
22	Mari Hemmer	Norway	41.60	41.600
23	Masako Hozumi	Japan	41.85	41.850
24	Petra Acker	United States	42.03	42.030

=== 1500 meter ===
Place	Athlete	Country	Time	Points
1	Ireen Wüst	Netherlands	1:56.30	38.766
2	Yekaterina Shikhova	Russia	1:56.31	38.770
3	Linda de Vries	Netherlands	1:57.46	39.153
4	Christine Nesbitt	Canada	1:57.47	39.156
5	Diane Valkenburg	Netherlands	1:57.87	39.290
6	Lotte van Beek	Netherlands	1:58.07	39.356
7	Ida Njåtun	Norway	1:58.41	39.470
8	Yevgeniya Dmitriyeva	Russia	1:59.14	39.713
9	Brittany Schussler	Canada	1:59.90	39.966
10	Natalia Czerwonka	Poland	1:59.94	39.980
10	Miho Takagi	Japan	1:59.94	39.980
12	Luiza Złotkowska	Poland	1:59.98	39.993
13	Kali Christ	Canada	2:00.05	40.016
14	Olga Graf	Russia	2:00.20	40.066
15	Maki Tabata	Japan	2:00.92	40.306
16	Masako Hozumi	Japan	2:01.05	40.350
17	Mari Hemmer	Norway	2:02.29	40.763
18	Anna Ringsred	United States	2:02.38	40.793
19	Katarzyna Woźniak	Poland	2:02.56	40.793
20	Anna Rokita	Austria	2:02.66	40.886
21	Petra Acker	United States	2:03.63	41.210
22	Maria Lamb	United States	2:03.82	41.273
23	Francesca Bettrone	Italy	2:06.35	42.116
	Claudia Pechstein	Germany	WDR	–

=== 3000 meter ===
Place	Athlete	Country	Time	Points
1	Ireen Wüst	Netherlands	4:05.41	40.901
2	Diane Valkenburg	Netherlands	4:08.12	41.353
3	Ida Njåtun	Norway	4:08.64	41.440
4	Yekaterina Shikhova	Russia	4:08.74	41.456
5	Linda de Vries	Netherlands	4:10.20	41.700
6	Yevgeniya Dmitriyeva	Russia	4:10.57	41.761
7	Masako Hozumi	Japan	4:11.60	41.933
8	Mari Hemmer	Norway	4:12.50	42.083
9	Brittany Schussler	Canada	4:13.24	42.206
10	Natalia Czerwonka	Poland	4:14.93	42.488
11	Olga Graf	Russia	4:14.97	42.495
12	Miho Takagi	Japan	4:15.71	42.618
13	Maki Tabata	Japan	4:15.87	42.645
13	Claudia Pechstein	Germany	4:15.87	42.645
15	Lotte van Beek	Netherlands	4:17.17	42.861
16	Luiza Złotkowska	Poland	4:17.27	42.878
17	Anna Rokita	Austria	4:17.49	42.915
18	Christine Nesbitt	Canada	4:18.13	43.021
19	Kali Christ	Canada	4:18.23	43.038
20	Maria Lamb	United States	4:20.25	43.375
21	Petra Acker	United States	4:20.44	43.406
22	Katarzyna Woźniak	Poland	4:21.10	43.516
23	Anna Ringsred	United States	4:26.02	44.336
24	Francesca Bettrone	Italy	4:32.52	45.420

=== 5000 meter ===
Place	Athlete	Country	Time	Points
1	Ireen Wüst	Netherlands	7:05.13	42.513
2	Diane Valkenburg	Netherlands	7:07.07	42.707
3	Linda de Vries	Netherlands	7:09.23	42.923
4	Masako Hozumi	Japan	7:10.19	43.019
5	Yekaterina Shikhova	Russia	7:16.48	43.648
6	Ida Njåtun	Norway	7:17.26	43.726
7	Yevgeniya Dmitriyeva	Russia	7:19.03	43.903
8	Lotte van Beek	Netherlands	7:32.59	45.259

=== Allround results ===
Place	Athlete	Country	500 m	3000 m	1500 m	5000 m	Points
1st place, gold medalist(s)	Ireen Wüst	Netherlands	39.35	4:05.41	1:56.30	7:05.13	161.530
2nd place, silver medalist(s)	Diane Valkenburg	Netherlands	39.77	4:08.12	1:57.87	7:07.07	163.120
3rd place, bronze medalist(s)	Yekaterina Shikhova	Russia	39.57	4:08.74	1:56.31	7:16.48	163.444
4	Linda de Vries	Netherlands	40.44	4:10.20	1:57.46	7:09.23	164.216
5	Ida Njåtun	Norway	40.03	4:08.12	1:58.41	7:17.26	164.666
6	Yevgeniya Dmitriyeva	Russia	40.02	4:10.57	1:59.14	7:19.03	165.397
7	Lotte van Beek	Netherlands	39.44	4:17.17	1:58.07	7:32.59	166.916
8	Masako Hozumi	Japan	41.85	4:11.60	2:01.05	7:10.19	167.152
9	Christine Nesbitt	Canada	38.60	4:18.13	1:57.47		120.777
10	Miho Takagi	Japan	39.53	4:15.71	1:59.94		122.128
11	Brittany Schussler	Canada	40.17	4:13.24	1:59.90		122.432
12	Kali Christ	Canada	39.66	4:18.22	2:00.05		122.712
13	Olga Graf	Russia	40.50	4:14.97	2:00.20		123.061
14	Luiza Złotkowska	Poland	40.40	4:17.27	1:59.98		123.271
15	Natalia Czerwonka	Poland	40.82	4:14.93	1:59.94		123.288
16	Maki Tabata	Japan	40.71	4:15.87	2:00.92		123.661
17	Mari Hemmer	Norway	41.60	4:12.50	2:02.29		124.446
18	Anna Rokita	Austria	41.34	4:17.49	2:02.66		125.141
19	Katarzyna Woźniak	Poland	41.11	4:21.10	2:02.56		125.479
20	Anna Ringsred	United States	40.45	4:26.02	2:02.38		125.579
21	Maria Lamb	United States	41.43	4:20.25	2:03.82		126.078
22	Petra Acker	United States	42.03	4:20.44	2:03.63		126.646
23	Francesca Bettrone	Italy	41.05	4:32.52	2:06.35		128.586
	Claudia Pechstein	Germany	40.68	4:15.87	WDR		
