= 2016 World Allround Speed Skating Championships =

International speed skating competition

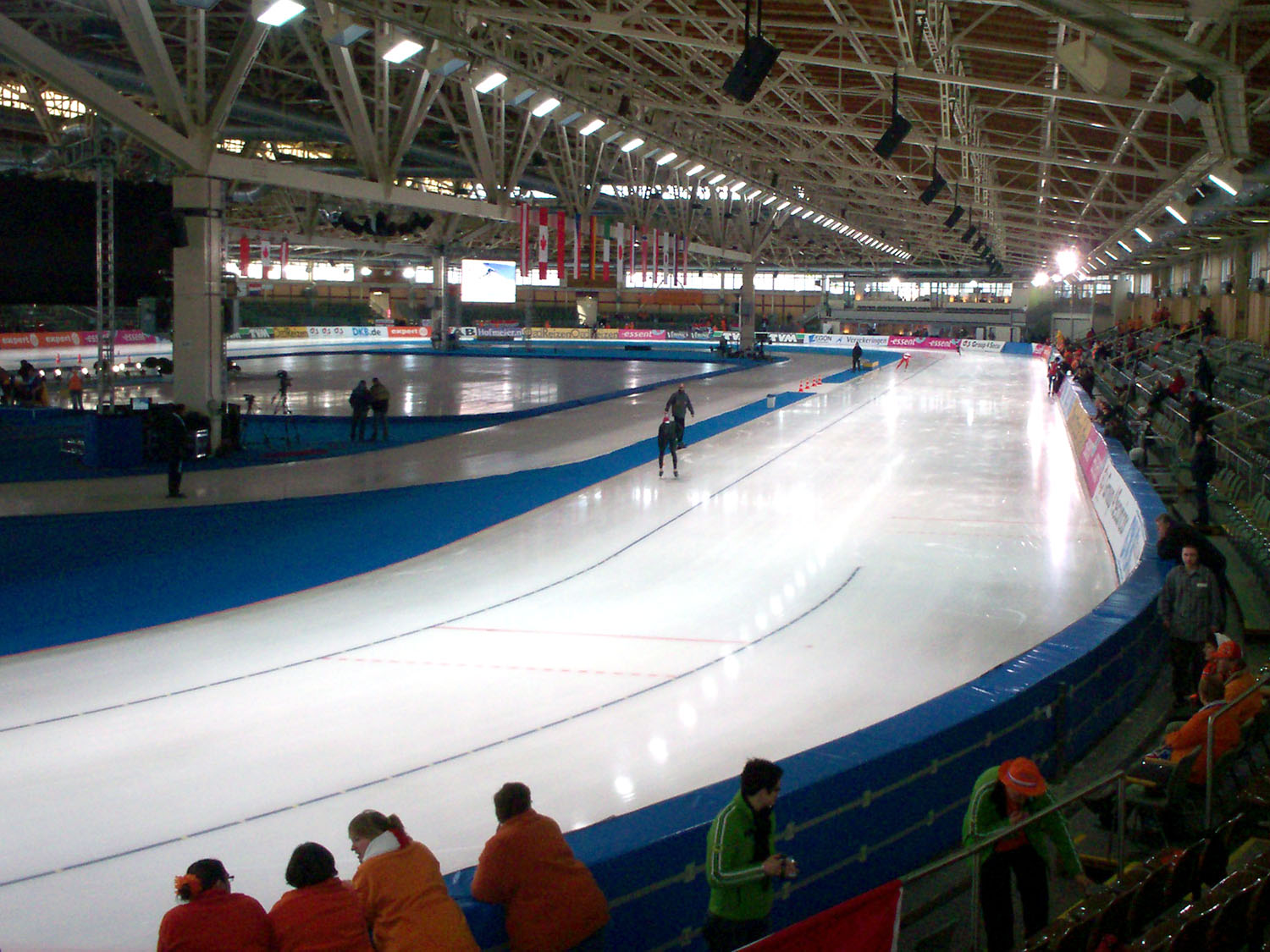
- Location: Berlin, Germany
- Venue: Sportforum Hohenschönhausen
- Dates: 5–6 March

Medalist men
1st place, gold medalist(s)		Sven Kramer	Netherlands
2nd place, silver medalist(s)		Sverre Lunde Pedersen	Norway
3rd place, bronze medalist(s)		Jan Blokhuijsen	Netherlands

Medalist women
1st place, gold medalist(s)		Martina Sáblíková	Czech Republic
2nd place, silver medalist(s)		Ireen Wüst	Netherlands
3rd place, bronze medalist(s)		Antoinette de Jong	Netherlands

The 2016 World Allround Speed Skating Championships was held in Berlin, Germany, from 5 to 6 March 2016.

== Schedule ==
Date	Event
5 March	Women's 500 m
5 March	Men's 500 m
5 March	Women's 3000 m
5 March	Men's 5000 m
6 March	Women's 1500 m
6 March	Men's 1500 m
6 March	Women's 5000 m
6 March	Men's 10000 m

== Medal summary ==
=== Medal table ===
Rank	Nation	Gold	Silver	Bronze	Total
1	Netherlands (NED)	1	1	2	4
2	Czech Republic (CZE)	1	0	0	1
3	Norway (NOR)	0	1	0	1
Totals (3 entries)		2	2	2	6

=== Medalists ===
Event	Gold		Silver		Bronze	
Men	Sven Kramer; NED	148.995	Sverre Lunde Pedersen; NOR	149.483	Jan Blokhuijsen; NED	149.672
Women	Martina Sáblíková; CZE	159.042	Ireen Wüst; NED	159.732	Antoinette de Jong; NED	161.380
