= Moritz Geisreiter =

German speed skater (born 1987)

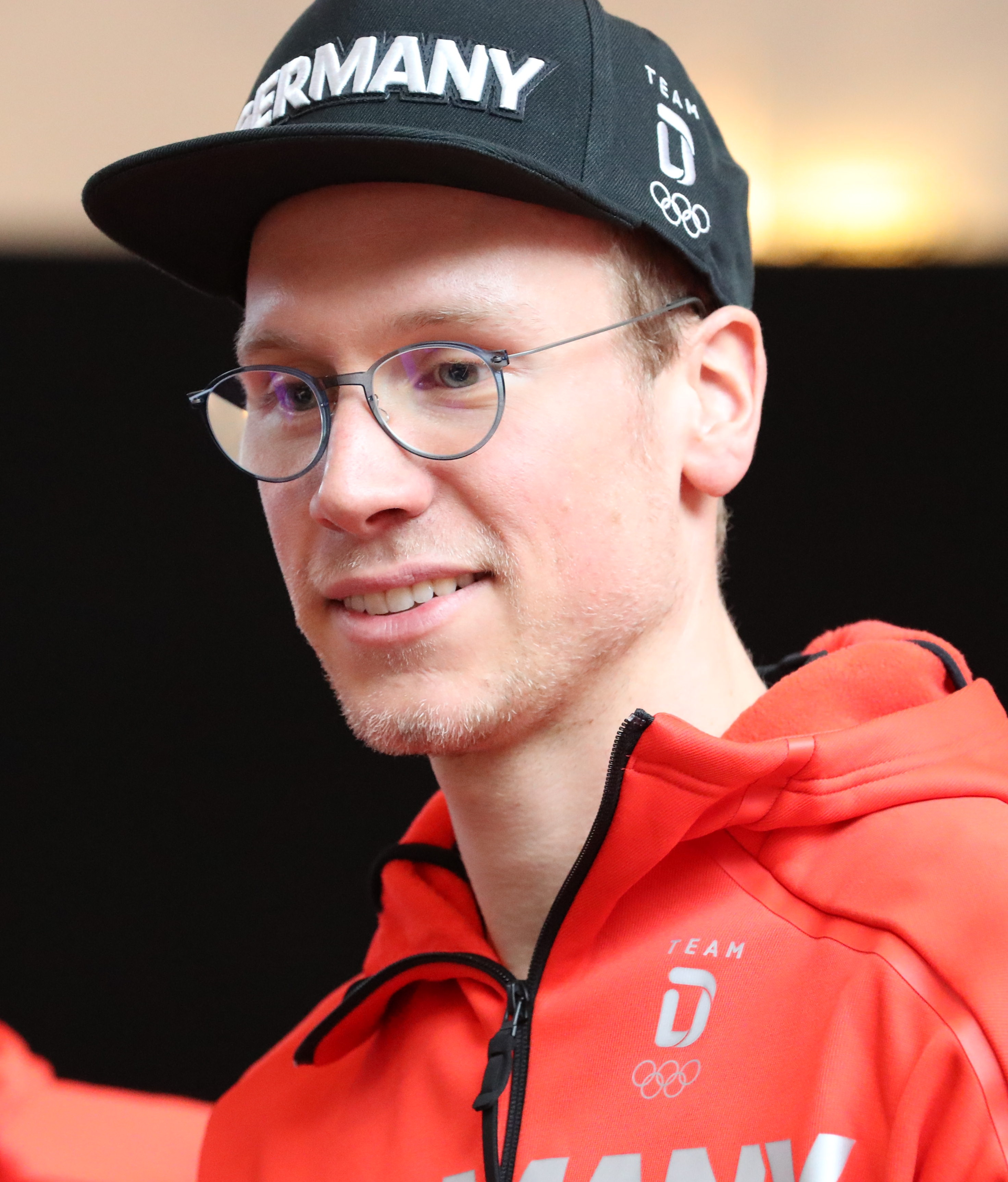
- Geisreiter in 2018

Personal information
- Born: 30 December 1987 (age 38) Bad Reichenhall, West Germany
- Height: 6 ft 6 in (198 cm)
- Weight: 214 lb (97 kg)

Sport
- Country: Germany
- Sport: Speed skating

Achievements and titles
- Highest world ranking: 9 (5000 & 10000 m)

Moritz Geisreiter (born 30 December 1987) is a German speed skater.

Geisreiter competed at the 2014 Winter Olympics for Germany. In the 5000 metres he finished 10th, and in the 10000 metres he was 8th.

As of September 2014, Geisreiter's best performance at the World Single Distance Championships is 4th, in the 2012 10000 metres. His best finish at the World All-Round Championships is 18th, in 2013.

Geisreiter made his World Cup debut in December 2007. As of September 2014, Geisreiter's best World Cup finish is 4th, in a 5000 m race at Inzell in 2012–13. His best overall finish in the World Cup is 9th, in the 2011–12 5000 & 10000 m Cup.
