= Håvard Bøkko =

Norwegian speed skater

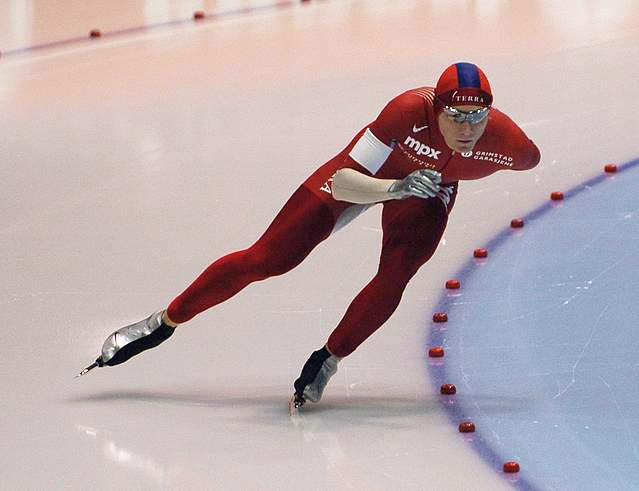
- Håvard Bøkko during the World Championships 2007 in Heerenveen

Personal information
- Nickname: The Shadow
- Nationality: Norwegian
- Born: 2 February 1987 (age 39) Hønefoss, Norway
- Height: 1.82 m (6 ft 0 in)
- Weight: 76 kg (168 lb)

Sport
- Country: Norway
- Sport: Speed skating
- Event(s): 1500 m, 5000 m, 10000 m
- Club: Hol IL
- Turned pro: 2004
- Retired: 2020
Medal record
Olympic Games
Gold medal – first place	2018 Pyeongchang	Team pursuit
Bronze medal – third place	2010 Vancouver	1500 m
World Allround Championships
Silver medal – second place	2008 Nagano	Allround
Silver medal – second place	2009 Hamar	Allround
Silver medal – second place	2011 Calgary	Allround
Silver medal – second place	2013 Hamar	Allround
Bronze medal – third place	2010 Heerenveen	Allround
World Single Distances Championships
Gold medal – first place	2011 Inzell	1500 m
Silver medal – second place	2009 Vancouver	5000 m
Silver medal – second place	2009 Vancouver	10000 m
Silver medal – second place	2016 Kolomna	Team pursuit
Silver medal – second place	2019 Inzell	Team pursuit
Bronze medal – third place	2012 Heerenveen	1500 m
European Championships
Silver medal – second place	2008 Kolomna	Allround
Silver medal – second place	2009 Heerenveen	Allround
Bronze medal – third place	2006 Hamar	Allround
Bronze medal – third place	2012 Budapest	Allround
Bronze medal – third place	2013 Heerenveen	Allround
Bronze medal – third place	2014 Hamar	Allround
Bronze medal – third place	2020 Heerenveen	Team pursuit

Håvard Bøkko (Norwegian: [ˈhôːvɑr ˈbœ̂kːʊ]; born 2 February 1987) is a Norwegian former speed skater, and the premier skater from his country since 2008, with 32 national championships and thirteen international medals. He had junior results similar to those of Sven Kramer, Gianni Romme and Eric Heiden from the early 1980s before the clap skate. He is the older brother of Hege Bøkko.

== Speed skating career ==
In 2006, Bøkko was the Junior World Champion, winning the three longest distances. In the European Speedskating Championships he won the bronze in 2006, was no. 4 in 2007, and caught the silver in 2008 and 2009 (on both occasions trailing Sven Kramer). In the World Allround Speedskating Championships he was no. 4 in 2007 and won the overall silver medal, after Sven Kramer, in both 2008 and 2009. At the latter occasion he managed the feat of reaching the podium for each of the four distances (silver, gold, silver, silver for 500, 1500, 5000, 10000 m). He went on to win the silver medal in the 2009 World Single Distance Championships 5000 and the 10000 m, only beaten by Kramer.

In November 2005, he broke three junior world records in two weeks. On 5 November 2005, he raced 3000 metres on 3:43.66, on the 13th he raced 5000 metres in 6:18.93 and on the 18th he broke the 1500 metre record with 1:46.07. As of March 2009, he is ranked 4th in the Speedskating Adelskalender and is the highest ranking Norwegian on this list.

Bøkko holds the Norwegian records in the 1500 m (1:42.67), the 5000 m (6:09.94), the 10000 m (12:53.89) and the allround samalogue event (145.761), and is with Sverre Haugli and Henrik Christiansen also on the team that holds the national record 3:42.88 in the Team Pursuit event. His 3:39.28 result from February 2009 is the 3rd best 3000 m time ever (after Eskil Ervik and Chad Hedrick). Also, as of March 2009, only six skaters (Shani Davis, Denny Morrison, Trevor Marsicano, Erben Wennemars, Simon Kuipers and Chad Hedrick) have skated the 1500 m faster than Bøkko's 1:42.67, and only four skaters (Sven Kramer, Enrico Fabris, Carl Verheijen and Chad Hedrick) have skated the 5000 m faster than his 6:09.94.

== Development ==
Season	Age	500 metres	1000 metres	1500 metres	3000 metres	5000 metres	10 000 metres
1995/96	9	55.6	2:06.3	–	–	–	–
1996/97	10	52.0	1:58.8	–	–	–	–
1997/98	11	50.63	1:54.8	–	–	–	–
1998/99	12	48.41	1:35.9	2:27.3	–	–	–
1999/00	13	46.50	1:33.07	2:25.77	5:22.6 –	–	–
2000/01	14	44.40	1:30.09	2:17.56	5:03.9 –	–	–
2001/02	15	41.82	1:24.29	2:09.38	4:35,44 –	9:00,2	18:46.2
2002/03	16	39.88	1:20.34	2:02.38	4:17.66 –	–	–
2003/04	17	38.46	1:17.6	1:57.98	4:05.32 –	7:05.00	–
2004/05	18	37.00	1:12.87	1:50.75	4:00.37 –	6:31.91	13:46.08
2005/06	19	36.65	1:10.57	1:46.07	3:43.66	6:18.93	13:24.09
2006/07	20	35.87	...	1:44.57	3:46.33	6:16.59	13:14.03
2007/08	21	...	1:08.60	1:43.93	3:40.22	6:12.28	13:06.42
2008/09	22	35.86	...	1:42.67	3:39.28	6:09.94	13:00.65
2009/10	23	36.27	1:08.42	1:42.89	3:44.34	6:13.25	13:04.08
2010/11	24	35.89	1:10.17	1:43.55	3:45.85	6:12.98	12:53.89
2011/12	25	36.47	1:10.39	1:45.97	3:44.37	6:17.88	13:05.55

== Records ==
=== World records ===
Distance	Time	Date	Location	Note
3000 m	3:43.66	15 November 2005	Calgary	Junior record
5000 m	6:18.93	13 November 2005	Calgary	Junior record
1500 m	1:46.07	18 November 2005	Salt Lake City	Junior record
3000 m	3:43.20	21 March 2006	Calgary	Junior record

=== Personal records ===
Personal records
Speed skating
Event	Result	Date	Location	Notes
500 metres	35.85	18 October 2013	Hamar	Norwegian Single Distances Championships
1000 metres	1:08.42	13 December 2009	Salt Lake City	World Cup
1500 metres	1:42.67	6 March 2009	Salt Lake City	World Cup; National record until 10 March 2019.
3000 metres	3:39.28	28 February 2009	Salt Lake City	Time trials; current track record.
5000 metres	6:09.94	7 March 2009	Salt Lake City	World Cup; National record until 10 December 2017.
10000 metres	12:53.89	13 February 2011	Calgary	World Allround Championship; National record until 25 January 2025.
Samalog	146.408	12–13 February 2011	Calgary	World Allround Championship; National record until 3 March 2019.
Team pursuit	3:37.08	21 February 2018	Calgary	Current national record with Simen Spieler Nilsen and Sverre Lunde Pedersen.

Source: SpeedskatingResults.com

Bøkko is currently in 9th position in the adelskalender with 145.661 points. From 6 March 2009 to 3 March 2019, he held a personal best 4th place.
