= Simen Spieler Nilsen =

Norwegian speed skater

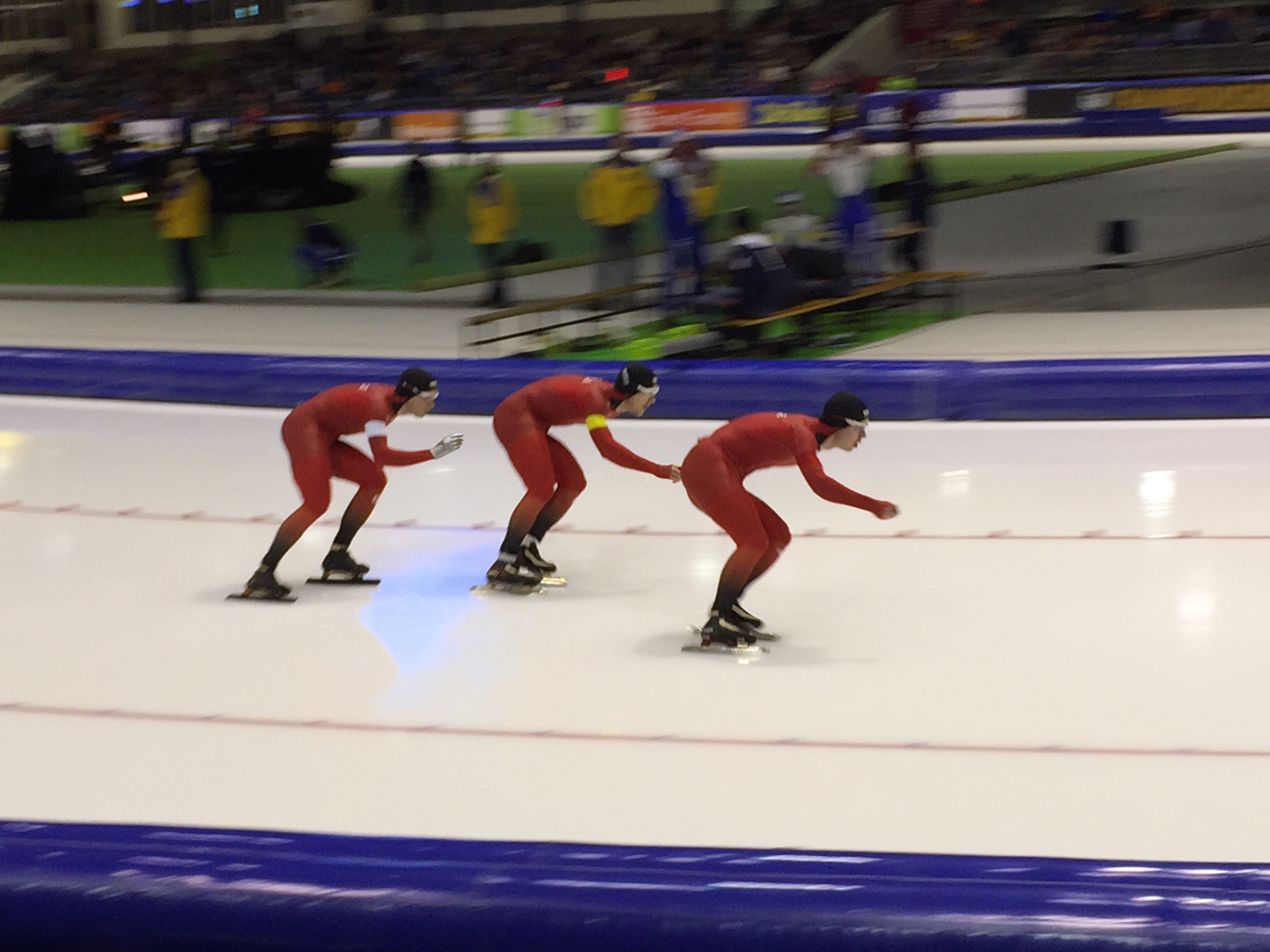

Personal information
- Born: 4 August 1993 (age 33) Arendal, Norway
- Height: 1.85 m (6 ft 1 in)

Sport
- Country: Norway
- Club: Arendal Skøiteklub
Medal record
Olympic Games
Gold medal – first place	2018 Pyeongchang	Team pursuit
World Single Distance Championships
Silver medal – second place	2016 Kolomna	Team pursuit
Bronze medal – third place	2017 Gangneung	Team pursuit

Simen Spieler Nilsen (born 4 August 1993) is a Norwegian speed skater.

== Career ==
He placed 15th in the 2013 World Allround Championships in Vikingskipet, Hamar. In the 2013 World Single Distance Championships in Adler Arena, Sochi, he placed 5th in the men's team pursuit.

Nilsen placed 25th in the men's 5000 metres in the 2014 Winter Olympics in Sochi.

== Records ==
=== Personal records ===
Personal records
Speed skating
Event	Result	Date	Location	Notes
500 meter	35.72	28 February 2015	Calgary	
1000 meter	1:11.64	22 November 2014	Calgary	
1500 meter	1:45.40	6 December 2017	Salt Lake City	
3000 meter	3:44.04	5 February 2018	Gangneung	
5000 meter	6:13.81	10 December 2017	Salt Lake City	
10000 meter	13:12.96	19 November 2017	Stavanger	

Nilsen occupies the 28th position on the adelskalender with a score of 147.882 points
