= Haralds Silovs =

Latvian speed skater

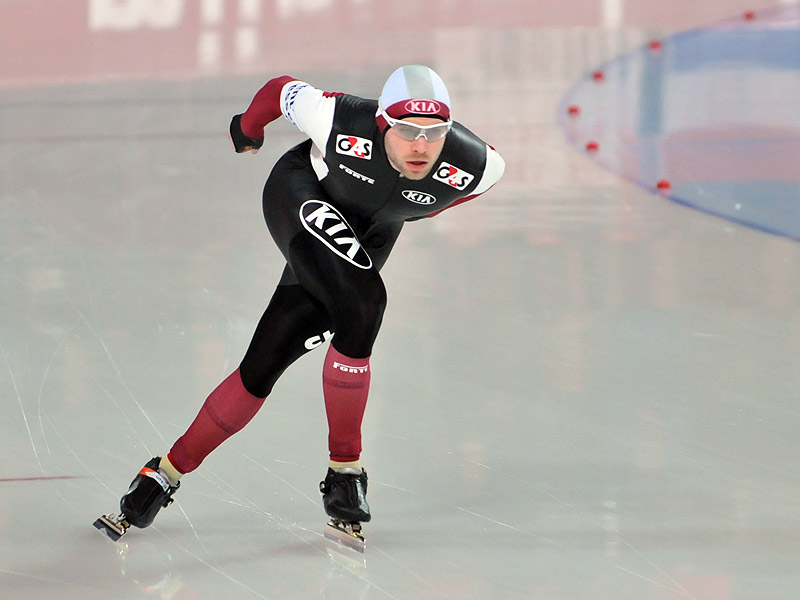
- Haralds Silovs at the World Allround Championships 2013 in Hamar

Personal information
- Born: 7 April 1986 (age 40) Riga, Latvian Soviet Socialist Republic, Soviet Union
- Height: 174 cm (5 ft 9 in)
- Weight: 77 kg (170 lb)
- Website: HaraldsSilovs.com

Sport
- Country: Latvia
- Sport: Speed skating Short track speed skating

Achievements and titles
- Personal bests: 500 m: 0:36.323 (2013); 1000 m: 1:07.472 (2013); 1500 m: 2:11.345 (2008); 3000 m: 4:42.344 :
Medal record
Men's short track speed skating
Representing Latvia
European Championships
Gold medal – first place	2008 Ventspil	Overall
Gold medal – first place	2008 Ventspils	1500 m
Gold medal – first place	2009 Torino	1500 m
Gold medal – first place	2011 Heerenveen	1000 m
Gold medal – first place	2011 Heerenveen	Overall
Silver medal – second place	2008 Ventspils	1000 m
Silver medal – second place	2009 Torino	Overall
Silver medal – second place	2011 Heerenveen	500 m
Bronze medal – third place	2011 Heerenveen	1500 m

Haralds Silovs (born 7 April 1986) is a Latvian long track and former short track speed skater, who became the 2008 and 2011 European champion in short track. He has participated in three Winter Olympics. In 2018, he finished fourth at speed skating 1500 metres event.

During the 2010 Winter Olympics in Vancouver, British Columbia, Canada, he gained worldwide media attention after competing in the 1500 m short track, and 5000 m long track speed skating events in the same day, 13 February. He is the first athlete in the history of the Winter Olympics to compete in both short track and long track events at the same Games and the only athlete to compete in two different disciplines on the same day.

== Biography ==
Silovs was born in Riga, Latvia, on 7 April 1986. His mother, Signe, was a figure skater, his father, Edvins, was a track cyclist for the USSR, and his older brother was involved in athletics. In addition to speed skating, Silovs became involved in mountain biking, and in 2001 at age 15, he won the Latvian Junior Championship in that sport.

He first became interested in speed skating in 1996, but interest in the sport across Latvia was relatively low, and there were few training or competition opportunities. Both Silovs and his brother were invited in 2001 to a training camp in Slovakia, where they were given instruction in speed skating by Hungarian coaches. By 2003, he was competing successfully in regional events across eastern Europe, and he trained with several Belgian and French athletes over the next few years. In 2006, he began working with a personal coach, Jeroen Otter, from the Netherlands. While he continued to train in speed skating, he also began attending Ventspils University College.

In 2007, Silovs had his first major success at the World Cup level of competition, winning a bronze medal in a 1000 m race and placing fifth in two World Championship events. The following year, in 2008, he won the gold medal at the European Championship in short track when the competition was held in his home territory, in Ventspils, Latvia. On his road to the title won both the 1500 and 3000 m distances in the competition. In 2009, he attempted to defend the title but instead won the silver, losing to four-time champion Nicola Rodigari of Italy.

Silovs holds several national records in both disciplines. For example, in August 2008, he reached new Latvian records of 37.05 (500 m) and 3:45.13 (3000 m), followed in February 2009 by 6:17.14 (5000 m). These national records were all set in Calgary and Salt Lake City.

=== 2010 Olympics ===
At the 2010 Winter Olympics, he became the first athlete in Olympic history to participate in both short track (1500 m) and long track (5000 m) speed skating and the first to compete in two different disciplines on the same day. Only one other athlete in recent memory had attempted to compete in both sports at the same Games, American Shani Davis, but Davis did not make his country's short track team. However, with no other Latvian athletes participating in the 2010 Olympic speed skating competitions, Silovs was able to make both teams for his country. It was his first Olympic Games, and he hoped that being able to compete in multiple events would allow him to acclimate to the level of competition in the Olympics more readily. He also hoped that differences in the two disciplines, between long track which is more demanding of aerobic fitness, and short track, which is more tactically and technically demanding, would mean that he would not be too physically exhausted to be competitive in both events. On 13 February 2010, after competing in the long track event and placing 20th, he skated a warm down lap and took a car across the city from Richmond to the Pacific Coliseum for the short track qualifying event. He qualified for the semifinal race but later failed to qualify for the medal round. In the classification round, he finished in 10th place. Despite his disappointing finishes, Silovs expressed excitement about having the opportunity to compete at all and having set a record as the first person to compete in both speed skating disciplines. However, he admitted that competing in both events on the same day was "a little crazy." He was encouraged by other speed skaters, like Apolo Anton Ohno, who recognized the feat. On 17 February, he began his third Olympic career event, qualifying for the short track 1000 m event.

Silovs currently lives in Inzell, Germany.
