= 2021 World Single Distances Speed Skating Championships – Men's 5000 metres =

Men's 5000 metres at the 2021 World Single Distances Speed Skating Championships
- Venue: Thialf
- Location: Heerenveen, Netherlands
- Date: 11 February
- Competitors: 20 from 12 nations
- Winning time: 6:08.395

Medalists
gold medal	Nils van der Poel	Sweden
silver medal	Patrick Roest	Netherlands
bronze medal	Sergey Trofimov

The Men's 5000 metres competition at the 2021 World Single Distances Speed Skating Championships was held on 11 February 2021.

== Results ==
The race was started at 16:01.

Rank	Pair	Lane	Name	Country	Time	Diff
1st place, gold medalist(s)	9	o	Nils van der Poel	Sweden	6:08.395; NR	
2nd place, silver medalist(s)	8	i	Patrick Roest	Netherlands	6:10.050	+1.65
3rd place, bronze medalist(s)	10	o	Sergey Trofimov	Russian Skating Union	6:13.020	+4.62
4	7	o	Danila Semerikov	Russian Skating Union	6:16.029	+7.63
5	6	i	Jorrit Bergsma	Netherlands	6:16.923	+8.52
6	3	i	Daniil Aldoshkin	Russian Skating Union	6:17.545	+9.15
7	8	o	Davide Ghiotto	Italy	6:17.693	+9.29
8	5	i	Bart Swings	Belgium	6:19.616	+11.22
9	2	i	Patrick Beckert	Germany	6:21.460	+13.06
10	7	i	Jordan Belchos	Canada	6:21.990	+13.59
11	3	o	Michele Malfatti	Italy	6:23.068	+14.67
12	9	i	Hallgeir Engebråten	Norway	6:26.539	+18.14
13	4	o	Peter Michael	New Zealand	6:26.637	+18.24
14	5	o	Andrea Giovannini	Italy	6:27.330	+18.93
15	2	o	Ethan Cepuran	United States	6:28.447	+20.05
16	1	o	Vitaliy Chshigolev	Kazakhstan	6:29.487	+21.09
17	6	o	Sverre Lunde Pedersen	Norway	6:31.400	+23.00
18	4	i	Peder Kongshaug	Norway	6:33.280	+24.88
19	10	i	Sven Kramer	Netherlands	6:35.527	+27.13
20	1	i	Timothy Loubineaud	France	6:38.064	+29.66
