= 2021 World Single Distances Speed Skating Championships – Men's 10000 metres =

Men's 10000 metres at the 2021 World Single Distances Speed Skating Championships
- Venue: Thialf
- Location: Heerenveen, Netherlands
- Date: 14 February
- Competitors: 12 from 8 nations
- Winning time: 12:32.952; WR

Medalists
gold medal	Nils van der Poel	Sweden
silver medal	Jorrit Bergsma	Netherlands
bronze medal	Aleksandr Rumyantsev

The men's 10000 metres competition at the 2021 World Single Distances Speed Skating Championships was held on 14 February 2021.

== Results ==
The race was started at 15:35.

Rank	Pair	Lane	Name	Country	Time	Diff
1st place, gold medalist(s)	3	o	Nils van der Poel	Sweden	12:32.952; WR	
2nd place, silver medalist(s)	4	i	Jorrit Bergsma	Netherlands	12:45.868	+12.91
3rd place, bronze medalist(s)	6	o	Aleksandr Rumyantsev	Russian Skating Union	12:54.746; NR	+21.79
4	4	o	Davide Ghiotto	Italy	12:57.235	+24.28
5	1	i	Ruslan Zakharov	Russian Skating Union	12:59.830	+26.88
6	5	o	Ted-Jan Bloemen	Canada	13:08.252	+35.30
7	6	i	Patrick Roest	Netherlands	13:09.429	+36.47
8	2	i	Jordan Belchos	Canada	13:11.082	+38.13
9	2	o	Patrick Beckert	Germany	13:12.279	+39.32
10	3	i	Michele Malfatti	Italy	13:13.889	+40.93
11	5	i	Peter Michael	New Zealand	13:16.688	+43.73
12	1	o	Timothy Loubineaud	France	13:40.314	+1:07.36
