= 2017 World Single Distances Speed Skating Championships – Men's 10,000 metres =

Men's 10,000 metres at the 2017 World Single Distances Speed Skating Championships
- Venue: Gangneung Oval
- Location: Gangneung, South Korea
- Dates: 11 February
- Competitors: 12 from 8 nations
- Winning time: 12:38.89

Medalists
gold medal	Sven Kramer	Netherlands
silver medal	Jorrit Bergsma	Netherlands
bronze medal	Patrick Beckert	Germany

The Men's 10,000 metres competition at the 2017 World Single Distances Speed Skating Championships was held on 11 February 2017.

== Results ==
The race was started at 20:37.

Rank	Pair	Lane	Name	Country	Time	Diff
1st place, gold medalist(s)	5	i	Sven Kramer	Netherlands	12:38.89	
2nd place, silver medalist(s)	6	i	Jorrit Bergsma	Netherlands	12:43.95	+5.06
3rd place, bronze medalist(s)	5	o	Patrick Beckert	Germany	12:52.76	+13.87
4	4	i	Ted-Jan Bloemen	Canada	12:54.63	+15.74
5	3	o	Davide Ghiotto	Italy	13:01.38	+22.49
6	2	i	Jordan Belchos	Canada	13:01.40	+22.51
7	1	o	Ryosuke Tsuchiya	Japan	13:11.94	+33.05
8	4	o	Nils van der Poel	Sweden	13:14.84	+35.95
9	6	o	Moritz Geisreiter	Germany	13:23.15	+44.26
10	2	o	Danila Semerikov	Russia	13:34.99	+56.10
11	1	i	Simen Spieler Nilsen	Norway	13:35.24	+56.35
—	3	i	Michele Malfatti	Italy	DSQ	
