= Speed skating at the 2022 Winter Olympics – Men's 10,000 metres =

Men's 10,000 metres at the XXIV Olympic Winter Games
- Speed skating
- Venue: National Speed Skating Oval, Beijing
- Date: 11 February 2022
- Competitors: 12 from 9 nations
- Winning time: 12:30.74

Medalists
1st place, gold medalist(s)		Nils van der Poel	Sweden
2nd place, silver medalist(s)		Patrick Roest	Netherlands
3rd place, bronze medalist(s)		Davide Ghiotto	Italy

The men's 10,000 m competition in speed skating at the 2022 Winter Olympics was held on 11 February, at the National Speed Skating Oval ("Ice Ribbon") in Beijing. Nils van der Poel of Sweden won the event, a few days after winning the 5000 m distance, and set a new world record. Patrick Roest of the Netherlands won the silver medal, and Davide Ghiotto of Italy the bronze, his first individual Olympic medal.

The defending champion and the Olympic record holder was Ted-Jan Bloemen. The silver medalist, Jorrit Bergsma, qualified for the Olympics as well. The bronze medalist, Nicola Tumolero, did not start. Nils van der Poel was the 2021 World Single Distances champion at the 10,000 m distance, with Bergsma and Alexander Rumyantsev being the silver and bronze medalist, respectively. Van der Poel was also the world record holder at the start of the Olympics. He was leading the 2021–22 ISU Speed Skating World Cup at long distances with four races completed before the Olympics, followed by Bloemen and Davide Ghiotto. Van der Poel's skated season best, 12:38.92 in Stavanger on 20 November 2021. No skater has ever won the 10,000 m distance twice.

Graeme Fish won the first pair, to be overtaken by Patrick Roest in pair 2. In pair 4, Bergsma skated the provisionally second time, with Roest still in the lead and two pairs to go. However, in pair 5 van der Poel set the world record, and Giotto, who until the last kilometer was faster than Roest, finally lost to Roest and became provisionally third. The last pair did not change the medal allocation.

== Qualification ==
A total of 12 entry quotas were available for the event, with a maximum of two athletes per NOC. The first eight athletes qualified through their performance at the 2021–22 ISU Speed Skating World Cup, while the last four earned quotas by having the best times among athletes not already qualified. A country could only earn the maximum two spots through the World Cup rankings.

The qualification time for the event (13:30.00 or 6:25.00 (5000 m)) was released on July 1, 2021, and was unchanged from 2018. Skaters had the time period of July 1, 2021 – January 16, 2022 to achieve qualification times at valid International Skating Union (ISU) events.

== Records ==
Prior to this competition, the existing world, Olympic and track records were as follows.

World record	Nils van der Poel (SWE)	12:32.95	Heerenveen, the Netherlands	14 February 2021
Olympic record	Ted-Jan Bloemen (CAN)	12:39.77	Gangneung, South Korea	15 February 2018
Track record				

A new world and Olympic record was set during the competition.

Date	Round	Athlete	Country	Time	Record
11 February	Pair 5	Nils van der Poel	Sweden	12:30.74	WR, OR, TR

== Results ==
The races were started at 16:00.

Rank	Pair	Lane	Name	Country	Time	Time behind	Notes
1st place, gold medalist(s)	5	I	Nils van der Poel	Sweden	12:30.74		WR, OR
2nd place, silver medalist(s)	2	O	Patrick Roest	Netherlands	12:44.59	+13.85	
3rd place, bronze medalist(s)	5	O	Davide Ghiotto	Italy	12:45.98	+15.24	NR
4	4	O	Jorrit Bergsma	Netherlands	12:48.94	+18.20	
5	4	I	Aleksandr Rumyantsev	ROC	12:51.33	+20.59	NR
6	1	O	Graeme Fish	Canada	12:58.80	+28.06	
7	3	O	Patrick Beckert	Germany	13:01.23	+30.49	
8	6	I	Ted-Jan Bloemen	Canada	13:01.39	+30.65	
9	2	I	Michele Malfatti	Italy	13:01.42	+30.68	
10	6	O	Bart Swings	Belgium	13:02.43	+31.69	
11	3	I	Ryosuke Tsuchiya	Japan	13:02.49	+31.75	
12	1	I	Peter Michael	New Zealand	13:33.53	+1:02.79	
