= Patrick Beckert =

German speed skater (born 1990)

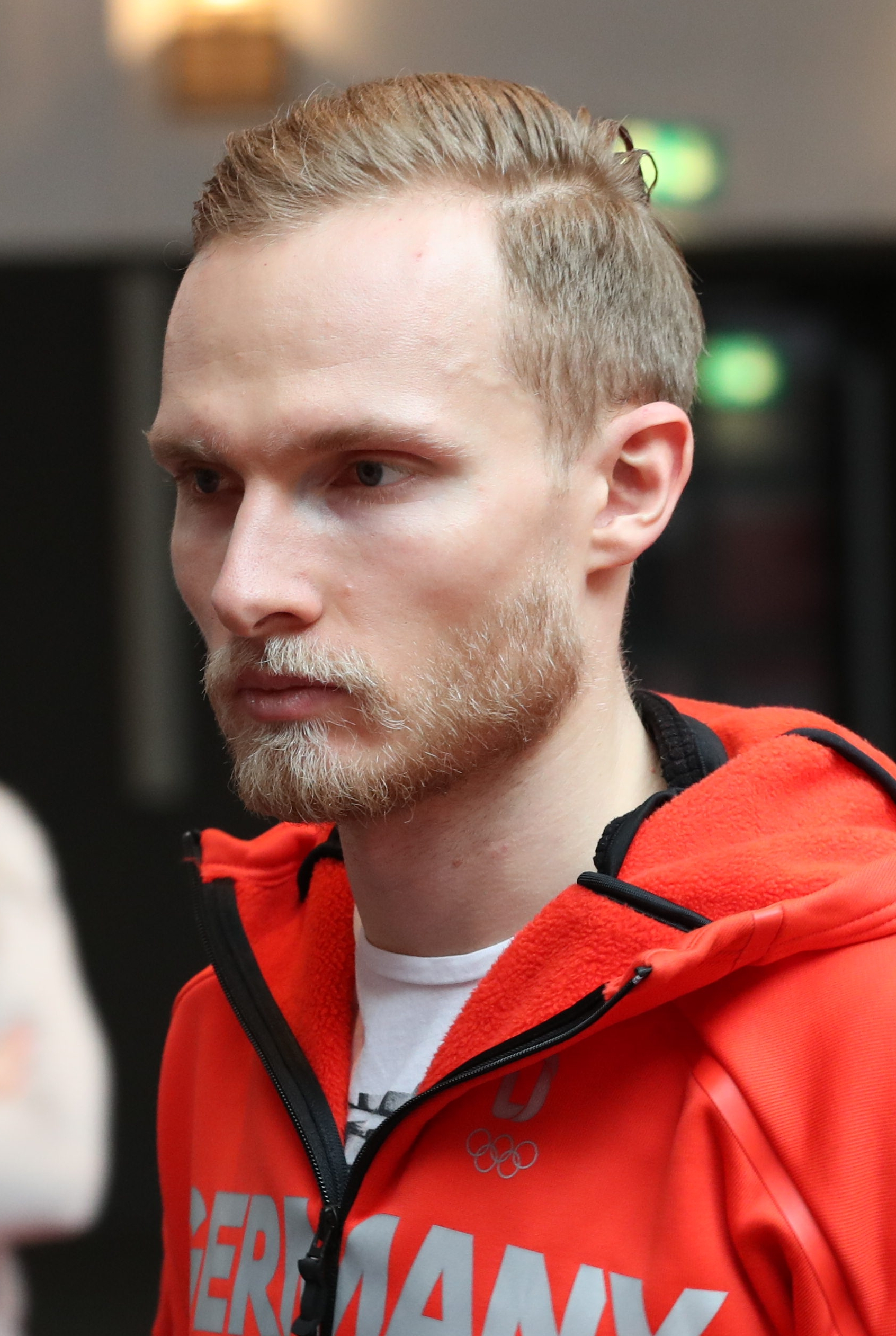
- Beckert in 2018

Personal information
- Nationality: German
- Born: 17 April 1990 (age 36) Erfurt, East Germany
- Height: 1.82 m (6 ft 0 in)
- Weight: 75 kg (165 lb)

Sport
- Country: Germany
- Sport: Speed skating
- Event: 5,000 m / 10,000 m
- Club: ESC Erfurt
Medal record
World Single Distance Championships
Bronze medal – third place	2015 Heerenveen	10,000 m
Bronze medal – third place	2017 Gangneung	10,000 m
Bronze medal – third place	2020 Salt Lake City	10,000 m

Patrick Beckert (born 17 April 1990) is a German speed skater. He was named Erfurt’s Athlete of the Year in 2016, 2017, and 2020 and is the brother of Olympic champion Stephanie Beckert.

== Career ==
Beckert was able to win medals at national and international levels as well as in the junior category. In the junior category, Beckert competed in the World Championships in 2007, 2008, and 2009. In 2007 in Innsbruck and 2009 in Zakopane, he and his team secured 2nd place in the men’s team competition. He is a multiple-time German junior champion and a 24-time German champion in the men’s category.

In the World Cup, he has stood on the podium ten times with two second and eight third-place finishes. In his first year in the adult category in the 2009/10 season, he ranked 23rd in the overall World Cup over 5/10 km. His best overall World Cup placements are 3rd place in the team event in 2011/12 and 2nd place in the long distance 5/10 km in the winter of 2013/14, a feat never achieved by a German speed skater over long distances.

Beckert has participated in the Single Distance World Championships nine times so far, as well as in the Allround World Championships in 2012, 2016, 2017, and 2019. His greatest success was winning the bronze medal over 10 km in German record time of 12:47.93 min in 2020. He also won the bronze medal over 10 km at the World Championships in 2015 and 2017. In addition, he finished 7th at the Allround World Championships in Hamar in 2017, setting a new German record.

He has participated in the Olympic Games four times so far, in 2010 in Vancouver, 2014 in Sochi, 2018 in Pyeongchang, and 2022 in Beijing. In 2010, at the age of 19, he was the youngest male German speed skater at the time and finished 22nd in the 5000-meter race with a time of 6:36.02 min, the best German over that distance. In 2014, he finished 8th in the 5 km race in 6:21.18 min and 6th in the 10 km race in 13:14.26 min, being the best German on both distances. In 2018 in South Korea, he finished seventh (10 km) and tenth (5 km), and in 2022 in Beijing, he finished seventh (10 km) and eleventh (5 km), once again being the best German runner in each case.

So far, he has set twelve German records in the men’s category and seven German records in the junior category, as well as nine championship records. He was the first German to run 10 km in under 13 minutes and 3 km in under 3:40 min. Currently, Beckert holds the German records for 3 km (3:37.31 min), 5 km (6:07.02 min), 10 km (12:47.93 min), Allround (151.730 points), and in team pursuit (3:40.50 min).

In 2015, Beckert was a member of the Dutch private team Jutstlease.nl. It was coached by Rutger Tijssen, the former coach of 5 and 10 km world record holder Sven Kramer. From 2016 to 2022, he trained with his younger brother Pedro in their hometown Erfurt following his own training program.

== Speed skating ==
=== Personal records ===
Personal records
Speed skating
Event	Result	Date	Location	Notes
500 m	37.59	2 March 2019	Olympic Oval, Calgary, Canada	
1000 m	1:11.91	26 October 2018	Max Aicher Arena, Inzell, Germany	
1500 m	1:45.15	13 December 2017	Olympic Oval, Calgary, Canada	
3000 m	3:37.31	7 November 2015	Olympic Oval, Calgary, Canada	German national record
5000 m	6:07.02	10 December 2017	Utah Olympic Oval, Salt Lake City, USA	German national record
10000 m	12:47.93	14 February 2020	Utah Olympic Oval, Salt Lake City, USA	German national record

== Tournament overview ==
Season	German Championships Single Distances	European Championships Allround	World Championships Allround	World Championships Single Distances	Olympic Games	World Championships Junior	World Cup GWC
2006–07						INNSBRUCK 33rd 500m 19th 3000m 39th 1500m DNQ 5000m 28th overall (silver) Team pursuit	
2007–08	ERFURT 5th 5000m					CHANGCHUN 31st 500m 15th 3000m 18th 1500m 16th 5000m 20th overall 6th Team pursuit	
2008–09	BERLIN 6th 1500m 4th 5000m					ZAKAPANE 5th 5000m (silver) Team pursuit	50th 5000m overall
2009–10	BERLIN (silver) 5000m	HAMAR 22nd 500m 19th 5000m 25th 1500m DNQ 10000m 19th overall	HEERENVEEN 21st 500m 14th 5000m 19th 1500m DNQ 10000m 18th overall		VANCOUVER 22nd 5000m		23rd 5000 overall 10th Team pursuit overall
2010–11	ERFURT 4th 1500m (silver) 5000m			INZELL 12th 5000m			9th 5000/10000m overall
2011–12	INZELL (gold) 1500m (silver) 5000m DQ 10000m	BUDAPEST 24th 500m 11th 5000m 16th 1500m DNQ 10000m 14th overall	MOSCOW 20th 500m 10th 5000m 13th 1500m 10th 10000m 10th overall	HEERENVEEN 21st 1500m 8th 5000m 6th Team pursuit			39th 1500m overall 11th 5000m overall (bronze) Team pursuit overall
2012–13	BERLIN (silver) 1500m			SOCHI 9th 5000m 8th 10000m 6th Team pursuit			47th 1500m overall 11th 5000/10000m overall 7th Team pursuit overall
2013–14	INZELL (gold) 1500m (gold) 5000m (gold) allround				SOCHI 23rd 1500m 8th 5000m 6th 10000m		35th 1500m overall (silver) 5000/10000m overall 7th Team pursuit overall
2014–15	BERLIN (gold) 1500m (gold) 5000m (gold) 10000m (gold) Mass Start		CALGARY 23rd 500m 6th 5000m 15th 1500m DNQ 10000m 17th overall	HEERENVEEN 7th 5000m (bronze) 10000m 16th Mass start			4th 5000/10000m overall
2015–16	INZELL (gold) 1500m (gold) 5000m (gold) Mass Start		BERLIN 23rd 500m 5th 5000m 19th 1500m 6th 10000m 7th overall	KOLOMNA 4th 5000m 4th 10000m			47th 1500m overall 5th 5000/10000m overall 8th Team pursuit overall
2016–17	INZELL (gold) 1500m (gold) 5000m (gold) 10000m		HAMAR 20th 500m 4th 5000m 14th 1500m 4th 10000m 7th overall	GANGNEUNG 7th 5000m (bronze) 10000m			40th 1500m overall 5th 5000/10000m overall 11th Team pursuit overall
2017–18	INZELL (gold) 1500m (gold) 5000m (gold) 10000m				GANGNEUNG 10th 5000m 7th 10000m		35th 1500m overall 6th 5000/10000m overall
2018–19	INZELL (gold) 1500m (gold) 5000m (gold) 10000m		CALGARY 22nd 500m 7th 5000m 13th 1500m DNQ 10000m 15th overall	INZELL 6th 5000m 4th 10000m			43rd 1500m overall 5th 5000/10000m overall
2019–20	INZELL (gold) 5000m (gold) 10000m			SALT LAKE CITY 6th 5000m (bronze) 10000m			8th 5000/10000m overall
2020–21				HEERENVEEN 9th 5000m 9th 10000m			12th 5000m/10000m overall
2021–22	INZELL (gold) 5000m (gold) 10000m				BEIJING 11th 5000m 7th 10000m		6th 5000m/10000m overall

Source German data:

- DNQ = Did not qualify for the final distance
- DQ = Disqualified

== World Cup overview ==
Season	1500 meter					
2008–2009						
2009–2010						
2010–2011						
2011–2012	–	5th(b)	–	–	–	–
2012–2013	16th(b)	17th(b	11th(b)	7th(b)	–	–
2013–2014	–	5th(b)	–	–	5th(b)	–
2014–2015						
2015–2016	8th(b)	–	–	–	19th(b)	–
2016–2017	–	–	–	–	5th(b)	–
2017–2018	–	–	13th(b)	–	4th(b)	–
2018–2019	9th(b)	–	–	10th(b)	–	–
2019–2020						
2020–2021						
2021–2022						

Season	5000/10000 meter					
2008–2009	8th(b)	–	–	–	–	–
2009–2010	15th(b)	18th	DQ	4th(b)	14th	16th
2010–2011	14th	14th	5th	12th	4th	9th
2011–2012	12th	12th	4th	10th	8th	11th
2012–2013	13th	5th(b)	4th(b)	10th	6th	11th
2013–2014	9th	11th	3rd place, bronze medalist(s)	9th	3rd place, bronze medalist(s)	4th
2014–2015	5th	5th	9th	8th	4th	3rd place, bronze medalist(s)
2015–2016	4th	4th	7th	8th	5th	10th
2016–2017	9th	11th	2nd place, silver medalist(s)	4th	5th	6th
2017–2018	10th	7th	3rd place, bronze medalist(s)	2nd place, silver medalist(s)	5th	DQ
2018–2019	4th	8th	4th	8th	5th	6th
2019–2020	11th	10th	8th	6th	8th	11th
2020–2021	8th	15th				
2021–2022	10th	8th	7th	8th	11th	

Season	Team Pursuit				
2008–2009					
2009–2010					
2010–2011	–	6th	11th	3rd place, bronze medalist(s)	
2011–2012	3rd place, bronze medalist(s)	3rd place, bronze medalist(s)	3rd place, bronze medalist(s)	4th	
2012–2013	5th	–	6th	–	
2013–2014	10th	6th	5th	–	
2014–2015					
2015–2016	7th	6th	–	–	
2016–2017	9th	–	9th	–	–
2017–2018					
2018–2019					
2019–2020					
2020–2021					
2021–2022					

- – = Did not participate
- (b) = Division B
- DQ = Disqualified

== Medals won ==
Championship	(gold) Gold	(silver) Silver	(bronze) Bronze
German Championships	24	6	0
World Championships Junior	0	2	0
World Championships Single Distances	0	0	3
World Cup	0	3	8

== Extras ==
- Thuringian achiever of the year 2011
- Erfurt athlete of the year 2016
- Erfurt athlete of the year 2017
- Erfurt athlete of the year 2020

== Sources ==
- Patrick Beckert Homepage
- Patrick Beckert at speedskatingnews.info
- Patrick Beckert at isuresults.eu
- Patrick Beckert at instagram.com
- Patrick Beckert at de.linkedin.com (in German)
- speedskatingnews.info statistics
- speedskatingnews.info records
- Patrick Beckert at teamdeutschland.de (in German)
- Patrick Beckert at bundeswehr-sport-magazin.de (in German)
- Patrick Beckert at thueringer-allgemeine.de (in German)
- Patrick Beckert at schaatsen.nl (in Dutch)
- Wikipedia Germany (in German)
