= List of Swedish records in speed skating =

The following are the national records in speed skating in Sweden maintained by the Svenska Skridskoförbundet.

== Men ==
Event	Record	Athlete	Date	Meet	Place	Ref
500 meters	35.44	Eric Zachrisson	20 November 2005	World Cup	Salt Lake City, United States	
500 meters × 2	71.61	Eric Zachrisson	13 February 2006	Olympic Games	Turin, Italy	
1000 meters	1:09.06	David Andersson	10 December 2017	World Cup	Salt Lake City, United States	
1500 meters	1:43.90	Joel Eriksson	11 December 2009	World Cup	Salt Lake City, United States	
3000 meters	3:42.68	Johan Röjler	5 November 2005		Calgary, Canada	
5000 meters	6:01.56	Nils van der Poel	3 December 2021	World Cup	Salt Lake City	
10000 meters	12:30.74	Nils van der Poel	11 February 2022	Olympic Games	Beijing, China	
Team sprint (3 laps)	1:24.48	Simon Jeppsson; Sebastian Forsmark; Kaspar Norberg	12 February 2023	World Junior Championships	Inzell, Germany	
Team pursuit (8 laps)	3:42.43	Joel Eriksson; Daniel Friberg; Johan Röjler	13 December 2009	World Cup	Salt Lake City, United States	
Sprint combination	141.890 pts	Eric Zachrisson	22–23 January 2005	World Sprint Championships	Salt Lake City, United States	
Small combination	149.801 pts	Daniel Friberg	18–19 March 2009	Olympic Oval Final	Calgary, Canada	
Big combination	150.166 pts	Nils van der Poel	16–17 January 2021	European Championships	Heerenveen, Netherlands	

== Women ==
Event	Record	Athlete	Date	Meet	Place	Ref
500 meters	38.75	Paulina Wallin	10 March 2007	World Single Distance Championships	Salt Lake City, United States	
500 meters × 2	77.54	Paulina Wallin	10 March 2007	World Single Distance Championships	Salt Lake City, United States	
1000 meters	1:18.01	Johanna Östlund	17 November 2013	World Cup	Salt Lake City, United States	
1500 meters	1:59.75	Johanna Östlund	16 November 2013	World Cup	Salt Lake City, United States	
3000 meters	4:12.94	Sofia Albertsson	18 November 2005	World Cup	Salt Lake City, United States	
5000 meters	7:29.08	Eva Lagrange	7 October 2023	International Season Opening	Inzell, Germany	
10000 meters	17:19.00	Karolin Palmertz Cerne	12 February 2017	Masters Single Distance Races	Hamar, Norway	
Team sprint (3 laps)	1:39.79	Alice Lundberg; Beyoncé Andersson; Josephine Grill	1 March 2026	World Junior Championships	Inzell, Germany	
Team pursuit (6 laps)	3:12.46	Sofia Albertsson; Sara Andersson; Marita Johansson	12 November 2005	World Cup	Calgary, Canada	
Sprint combination	158.440 pts	Paulina Wallin	March 2006	Olympic Oval Final	Calgary, Canada	
Mini combination	166.611 pts	Sofia Albertsson	March 2001	Olympic Oval Final	Calgary, Canada	
Small combination	172.255 pts	Marita Johansson	12–13 March 2008	Olympic Oval Final	Calgary, Canada	

== Mixed ==
Event	Record	Athlete	Date	Meet	Place	Ref
Relay	3:21.49	Alice Lundberg; Finn Zachrisson	1 March 2026	World Junior Championships	Inzell, Germany	
