= Ted-Jan Bloemen =

Dutch-Canadian speed skater (born 1986)

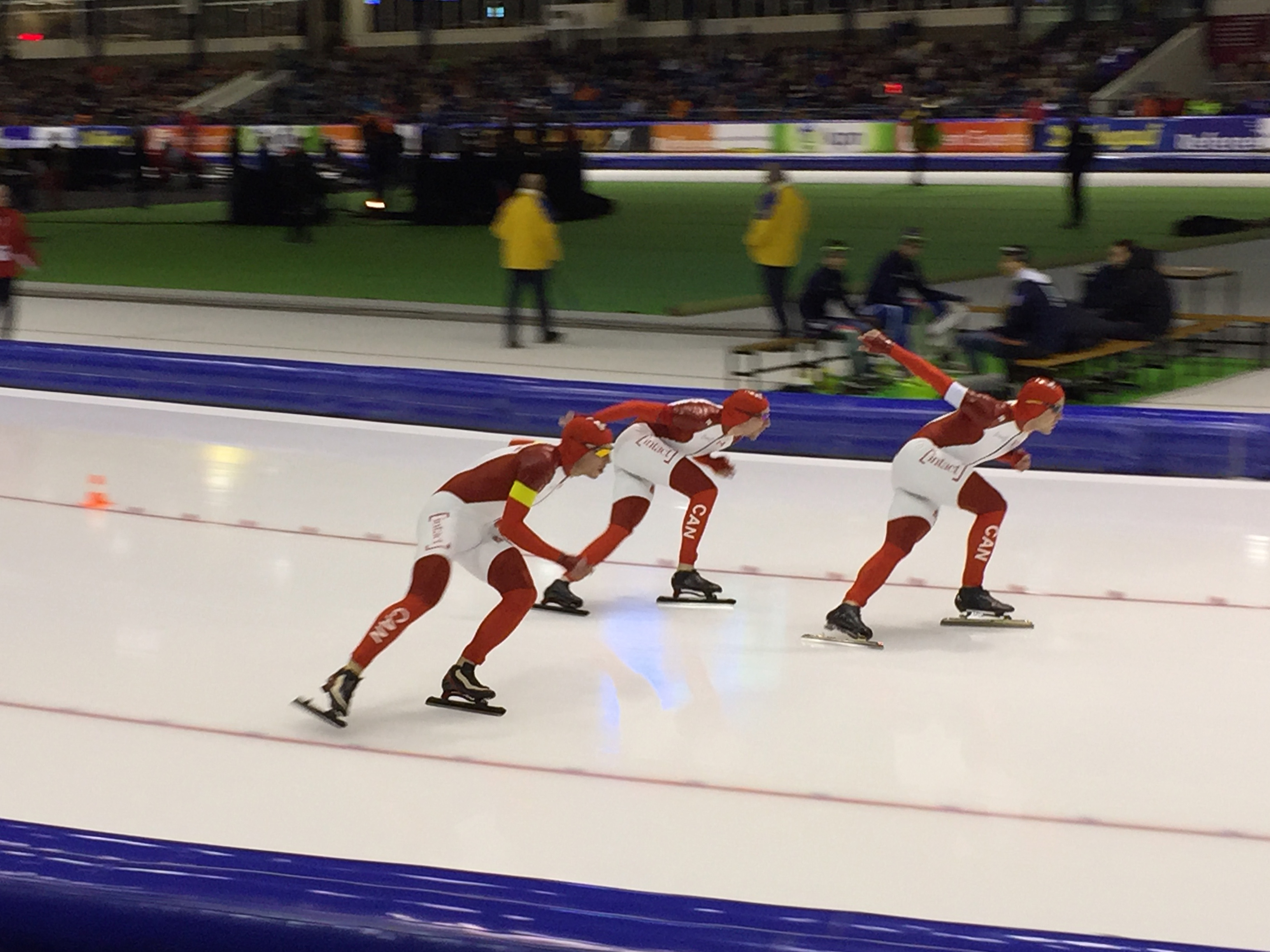
- Bloemen (in the middle) during the team pursuit at the 2015 World Single Distance Speed Skating Championships

Personal information
- Nationality: Dutch; Canadian
- Born: 16 August 1986 (age 40) Leiderdorp, Netherlands
- Height: 1.77 m (5 ft 10 in)
- Weight: 72 kg (159 lb)

Sport
- Country: Canada
- Sport: Speed skating
- Events: 5000 m, 10000 m
- Club: Ichiban SSC
- Turned pro: 2006
- Coached by: Bart Schouten
Medal record
Men's speed skating
Representing Canada
Olympic Games
Gold medal – first place	2018 Pyeongchang	10,000 m
Silver medal – second place	2018 Pyeongchang	5,000 m
World Single Distance Championships
Gold medal – first place	2020 Salt Lake City	5,000 m
Silver medal – second place	2015 Heerenveen	Team pursuit
Silver medal – second place	2016 Kolomna	10,000 m
Silver medal – second place	2020 Salt Lake City	10,000 m
Silver medal – second place	2021 Heerenveen	Team pursuit
Silver medal – second place	2024 Calgary	10000 m
Bronze medal – third place	2016 Kolomna	Team pursuit
Bronze medal – third place	2023 Heerenveen	10000 m
Four Continents Championships
Gold medal – first place	2022 Calgary	5000 m
Gold medal – first place	2022 Calgary	Team pursuit
Silver medal – second place	2022 Calgary	1500 m
Bronze medal – third place	2024 Salt Lake City	5000 m
Bronze medal – third place	2025 Hachinohe	Team pursuit

Ted-Jan Bloemen (born 16 August 1986) is a Dutch-Canadian long track speed skater. He started competing for the Canadian national speed skating team during the 2014–15 season, but before that, he competed for the Netherlands in international competitions. Bloemen primarily competes in long-distance events as well as team pursuit events. He is a former world record holder for the 5,000 m (6:01.86), set in Salt Lake City, and was the Olympic record holder for the 10,000 m (12:39.77), set when he won gold at the 2018 Winter Olympics in Pyeongchang. Bloemen also won a silver medal in the 5,000 m at the Pyeongchang Olympics, the first Canadian man to medal in the distance since 1932. He has won a silver in 10,000 m and one bronze and silver in the team pursuit at the World Speed Skating Championships.

== Career ==
Bloemen started skating at a young age in his hometown of Gouda. He participated at the 2006 World Junior Speed Skating Championships in Erfurt, where he came in 5th. In the 2007/2008 season, he first participated in the Speed Skating World Cup at the long distances, winning the Team pursuit with the Dutch team. He also reached 4th place at that season's Dutch Allround Championships and 8th place at the 2008 European Speed Skating Championships. The 2009/2010 season was his best up to that point, coming in second at the Dutch Allround and 4th at the World Allround Championships. Following a less successful next season, he retired as a professional skater but still participated in championships as an amateur operating from Friesland. Remarkably, he qualified for the 2012 European (9th place) and World Championships (14th place) and won the National Championships. Though somewhat aided by the absence of Jan Blokhuijsen and Sven Kramer, this was the first time that an amateur won this Dutch National Championships since the introduction of professional skating. He joined the (professional) BAM skating team the next season, but disappointing results (15th at the European Championships) caused his contract not to be extended.

Bloemen moved to Canada to compete for the Canadian national team in the summer of 2014. He won a silver medal as part of the team pursuit with Canada at the 2015 World Single Distance Speed Skating Championships. There Canada's Denny Morrison and teammate said of the team's silver that "With (Bloemen) coming over this summer, it was a new team, and we struggled early on this season. So we had to communicate, find out what our flaws were, correct our flaws, and we had better results... And today, it all came together. This is just the beginning for us on the road to the 2018 Olympics."

He set a world record in the 10,000 metres on 21 November 2015 with a time of 12 minutes 36.30 seconds at an ISU World Cup event. This was more than five seconds faster than the previous mark of 12:41.69 set by Sven Kramer of the Netherlands on 10 March 2007; both men set their times at Salt Lake City's Utah Olympic Oval. After the race he said, "I've dreamt of this record for a long time. It was a perfect race. All through the race, I heard the P.A. announcer and the crowd go wild when they saw my times and realized I was close to a world record. But I was quick to ignore it all, and I was able to refocus on my technique, which was key to having a good race – as well as being consistent, physically and mentally." Two years later, Bloemen also beat the 5,000 m world record, again pipping Kramer to the feat, overcoming the ten-year-old time that Kramer put up with a time of 6:01.86.

The 2018 Winter Olympics took place in Pyeongchang, Korea and there Bloemen competed for Canada in his first Olympics at the age of 31. In the 5,000 m race, his first event, he skated to a silver medal. Trailing his skating partner Sverre Lunde Pedersen on the final lap by nearly a second, Bloemen was able to tie Pedersen in a photo finish. Photo technology later revealed that he had beaten Pedersen by two-thousandths of a second. This was the first medal for Canada in the men's 5,000 m since Willy Logan won bronze in Lake Placid at the 1932 Winter Olympics. In the 10,000 m race, Bloemen won the gold medal to become the first non-Dutch skater to win a speed-skating event at the 2018 Games. He also set the new Olympic Record for that distance. Bloemen finished off the season by winning the annual World Cup 5,000/10,000-metre classification championship.

On February 13, 2020, Bloemen won the gold medal in the 5000 m event at the 2020 World Single Distances Speed Skating Championships skated at the Utah Olympic Oval in Salt Lake City; Canadian teammate Graeme Fish took the bronze. The next day he finished second in the 10,000 m race in which Fish broke Bloemen's 2015 world record to take the gold medal.

Bloemen competed at his 3rd Winter Olympic Games at the Milano Cortina games in 2026, competing in the 5000 m and 10,000 m events, finishing 13th and 9th, respectively.

== Personal ==
Bloemen's father, Gerhard-Jan Bloemen, is a retired general practitioner in Gouda and has dual Dutch-Canadian citizenship, being born in Bathurst, New Brunswick, a few years before his Dutch parents returned with him to the Netherlands. This made Bloemen also a dual citizen through his Canadian-born father, who, though born in Canada, is Dutch by birth as both his parents were Dutch.

Bloemen is married to Marlinde, and they have two kids: Fiene and Thias.

== Personal records ==
Personal records
Men's speed skating
Event	Result	Date	Location	Notes
500 m	36.87	19 March 2010	Thialf, Heerenveen	World Allround Championships
1000 m	1:10.87	21 March 2009	Olympic Oval, Calgary	Intact Finale 2009
1500 m	1:44.91	15 November 2015	Olympic Oval, Calgary	World Cup
3000 m	3:37.04	30 December 2017	Olympic Oval, Calgary	Time trials; Current national record.
5000 m	6:01.86	10 December 2017	Utah Olympic Oval, Salt Lake City	Former world record
10,000 m	12:33.75	18 December 2022	Olympic Oval, Calgary	World Cup
Samalog	148.630	2–3 March 2019	Olympic Oval, Calgary	World Allround Championships; Current national record.

As of 8 March 2026, Bloemen is in 13th position in the adelskalender with 145.713 points. Between 12 October 2017 and 2 March 2019 he held a personal best 5th place.

== Tournament overview ==
Season	Dutch Championships Single Distances	Dutch Championships Allround	European Championships Allround	World Championships Allround	World Championships Single Distances	Olympic Games	World Cup GWC	World Championships Junior	Canadian Championships Single Distances/ Long Track
2005–06	HEERENVEEN 24th 1500m 15th 5000m	UTRECHT 13th 500m 13th 5000m 23rd 1500m DNQ 10000m NC overall(20th)						ERFURT 22nd 500m (bronze) 5000m 9th 1500m (bronze) 10000m 5th overall (gold) team pursuit	
2006–07	ASSEN 14th 5000m	HEERENVEEN 20th 500m 15th 5000m 25th 1500m DNQ 10000m NC overall(21st)							
2007–08	HEERENVEEN 9th 5000m 5th 10000m	GRONINGEN 8th 500m 5th 5000m 15th 1500m (silver) 10000m 4th overall	KOLOMNA 14th 500m 9th 5000m 15th 1500m 7th 10000m 8th overall				38th 5000/10000m (gold) team pursuit		
2008–09	HEERENVEEN 5th 5000m 4th 10000m	HEERENVEEN 22nd 500m 16th 5000m DNS 1500m DNS 10000m NC overall					6th 5000/10000m		
2009–10	HEERENVEEN 9th 5000m	HEERENVEEN 8th 500m (gold) 5000m 6th 1500m (gold) 10000m (silver) overall		HEERENVEEN 13th 500m (bronze) 5000m 7th 1500m (bronze) 10000m 4th overall					
2010–11	HEERENVEEN 11th 1500m 9th 5000m 5th 10000m	HEERENVEEN 13th 500m 5th 5000m 11th 1500m 6th 10000m 5th overall					35th 5000/10000m		
2011–12	HEERENVEEN 7th 5000m 11th 10000m	HEERENVEEN 8th 500m (gold) 5000m 4th 1500m (gold) 10000m (gold) overall	BUDAPEST 14th 500m 4th 5000m 23rd 1500m 6th 10000m 9th overall	MOSCOW 15th 500m 14th 5000m 14th 1500m DNQ 10000m NC overall(14th)			28th 5000/10000m		
2012–13	HEERENVEEN 5th 5000m 4th 10000m	HEERENVEEN 16th 500m 4th 5000m 8th 1500m 4th 10000m 4th overall	HEERENVEEN 20th 500m 11th 5000m 18th 1500m DNQ 10000m NC overall(15th)				8th 5000/10000m		
2013–14	HEERENVEEN 12th 5000m 10th 10000m	AMSTERDAM 13th 500m 9th 5000m 13th 1500m DNQ 10000m NC overall(12th)							
2014–15				CALGARY 22nd 500m 8th 5000m 17th 1500m DNQ 10000m NC overall(16th)	HEERENVEEN 6th 5000m 6th 10000m (silver) team pursuit		36th 1500m 16th 5000/10000m		CALGARY (bronze) 1500m (gold) 5000m 19th 500m
2015–16				BERLIN 21st 500m 4th 5000m 13th 1500m 5th 10000m 5th overall	KOLOMNA 5th 5000m (silver) 10000m (bronze) team pursuit		28th 1500m 4th 5000/10000m		
2016–17					GANGNEUNG 5th 5000m 4th 10000m 4th team pursuit		27th 1500m (silver) 5000/10000m		CALGARY (silver) 5000m 17th 500m DQ 1500m (gold) 1500m
2017–18				AMSTERDAM 19th 500m 15th 5000m 6th 1500m DNQ 10000m NC overall(16th)		GANGNEUNG (silver) 5000m (gold) 10000m 7th team pursuit	43rd 1500m (gold) 5000/10000m		CALGARY (gold) 5000m 4th 1500m (gold) 10000m
2018–19				CALGARY 19th 500m 5th 5000m 12th 1500m (silver) 10000m 5th overall	INZELL 5th 5000m 5th team pursuit		34th 1500m 7th 5000/10000m		CALGARY (gold) 5000m (bronze) 1500m
2019–20				HAMAR 21st 500m 5th 5000m 16th 1500m 4th 10000m 7th overall	SALT LAkE CITY (gold) 5000m (silver) 10000m 4th team pursuit		59th 1500m 4th 5000/10000m		CALGARY (bronze) 5000m (gold) 10000m 6th 1500m
2020–21					HEERENVEEN 6th 10000m (silver) team pursuit		29th 1500m 15th 5000/10000m		
2021–22				HAMAR 17th 500m 16th 5000m DNS 1500m DNS 10000m NC overall		BEIJING 10th 5000m 8th 10000m 5th team pursuit			CALGARY (gold) 5000m (gold) 10000m 5th 1500m

== Medal overview ==
Championship	1st place, gold medalist(s)	2nd place, silver medalist(s)	3rd place, bronze medalist(s)
Dutch Championships Allround	1	1	0
Olympic Games	1	1	0
World Championships Single Distances team	0	1	0
World Championships Allround individual	0	1	2
World Championships Junior team	1	0	0
World Cup individual team	1; 1	0; 1	1; 0
Dutch Championships Allround single distances	4	1	0

=== Career highlights ===
Winter Olympics
2018 – Pyeongchang, (silver) at Men's 5000m
2018 – Pyeongchang, (gold) at Men's 10000m
World Allround Championships
2010 – Heerenveen, 4th
2016 – Berlin, 5th
2019 – Calgary, 5th
European Allround Championships
2008 – Kolomna, 8th
National Allround Championships
2010 – Heerenveen, (silver)
2012 – Heerenveen, (gold)
World Junior Allround Championships
2006 – Erfurt, 5th
2006 – Erfurt, (gold) 1st at team pursuit
European Junior Games
2006 – Collalbo, (gold) 1st at team pursuit
2006 – Collalbo, (bronze) 3rd at 1500 m

Records
Preceded by (Netherlands) Sven Kramer	Men's 5000 m speed skating world record 10 December 2017 – 3 December 2021	Succeeded by (Sweden) Nils van der Poel
Preceded by (Netherlands) Sven Kramer	Men's 10,000 m speed skating world record 21 November 2015 – 14 February 2020	Succeeded by (Canada) Graeme Fish
Awards
Preceded by (United States) Brittany Bowe	Oscar Mathisen Award; 2016	Succeeded by (Netherlands) Sven Kramer
