= 2015 World Single Distance Speed Skating Championships – Men's 10,000 metres =

Men's 10,000 metres at the 2015 World Single Distance Speed Skating Championships
- Venue: Thialf, Heerenveen
- Date: 12 February 2015
- Competitors: 12 from 8 nations
- Winning time: 12:54.82

Medalists
gold medal	Jorrit Bergsma	Netherlands
silver medal	Erik Jan Kooiman	Netherlands
bronze medal	Patrick Beckert	Germany

The Men's 10,000 metres race of the 2015 World Single Distance Speed Skating Championships was held on 12 February 2015.

== Results ==
The race was started at 19:33.

Rank	Pair	Lane	Name	Country	Time	Diff
1st place, gold medalist(s)	6	i	Jorrit Bergsma	NED	12:54.82	
2nd place, silver medalist(s)	3	i	Erik Jan Kooiman	NED	13:02.57	+7.75
3rd place, bronze medalist(s)	4	o	Patrick Beckert	GER	13:10.95	+16.13
4	5	i	Sverre Lunde Pedersen	NOR	13:12.40	+17.58
5	5	o	Aleksandr Rumyantsev	RUS	13:14.62	+19.80
6	3	o	Ted-Jan Bloemen	CAN	13:17.24	+22.42
7	2	i	Lee Seung-hoon	KOR	13:19.03	+24.21
8	6	o	Bart Swings	BEL	13:22.85	+28.03
9	4	i	Alexej Baumgärtner	GER	13:30.24	+35.42
10	1	i	Yevgeny Seryaev	RUS	13:30.24	+41.52
11	2	o	Jordan Belchos	CAN	13:41.72	+46.90
12	1	o	Martin Hänggi	SUI	13:57.65	+1:02.83
