= Poland at the World Single Distance Championships =

- IOC code: POL
- Medals Ranked =15th: Gold 0 Silver 1 Bronze 2 Total 3

This page is an overview of the results of Poland at the World Single Distance Championships.

== List of medalists ==
Medal	Championship	Name	Event
Bronze	2012 Heerenveen	Natalia Czerwonka; Katarzyna Woźniak; Luiza Złotkowska	Women's Team pursuit
Silver	2013 Sochi	Katarzyna Bachleda-Curuś; Natalia Czerwonka; Luiza Złotkowska	Women's Team pursuit
Bronze	2013 Sochi	Zbigniew Bródka; Konrad Niedźwiedzki; Jan Szymański	Men's Team pursuit

== Medal table ==
=== Medals by discipline ===
Event	Gold	Silver	Bronze	Total	Rank
Men's Team pursuit	0	0	1	1	=10
Women's Team pursuit	0	1	1	2	=8

=== Medals by championship ===
Event	Gold	Silver	Bronze	Total	Rank
2012 Heerenveen	0	0	1	1	=9
2013 Sochi	0	1	1	2	7
