= 2024 World Single Distances Speed Skating Championships – Men's 10000 metres =

Men's 10000 metres at the 2024 World Single Distances Speed Skating Championships
- Venue: Olympic Oval
- Location: Calgary, Canada
- Dates: February 18
- Competitors: 12 from 8 nations
- Winning time: 12:38.82

Medalists
gold medal	Davide Ghiotto	Italy
silver medal	Ted-Jan Bloemen	Canada
bronze medal	Graeme Fish	Canada

The Men's 10000 metres competition at the 2024 World Single Distances Speed Skating Championships was held on February 18, 2024.

== Results ==
The race was started at 13:07.

Rank	Pair	Lane	Name	Country	Time	Diff
1st place, gold medalist(s)	6	o	Davide Ghiotto	Italy	12:38.82	
2nd place, silver medalist(s)	4	i	Ted-Jan Bloemen	Canada	12:47.01	+8.19
3rd place, bronze medalist(s)	2	o	Graeme Fish	Canada	12:48.61	+9.79
4	5	i	Patrick Roest	Netherlands	12:50.32	+11.50
5	4	o	Jorrit Bergsma	Netherlands	12:50.91	+12.09
6	1	i	Sander Eitrem	Norway	13:01.71	+22.89
7	3	i	Wu Yu	China	13:06.93	+28.11
8	5	o	Michele Malfatti	Italy	13:07.01	+28.19
9	6	i	Bart Swings	Belgium	13:07.45	+28.63
10	1	o	Casey Dawson	United States	13:08.35	+29.53
11	2	i	Riku Tsuchiya	Japan	13:27.84	+49.02
12	3	o	Wang Shuaihan	China	14:01.72	+1:22.90
