= 2016 World Single Distances Speed Skating Championships – Men's 10,000 metres =

Men's 10,000 metres at the 2016 World Single Distances Speed Skating Championships
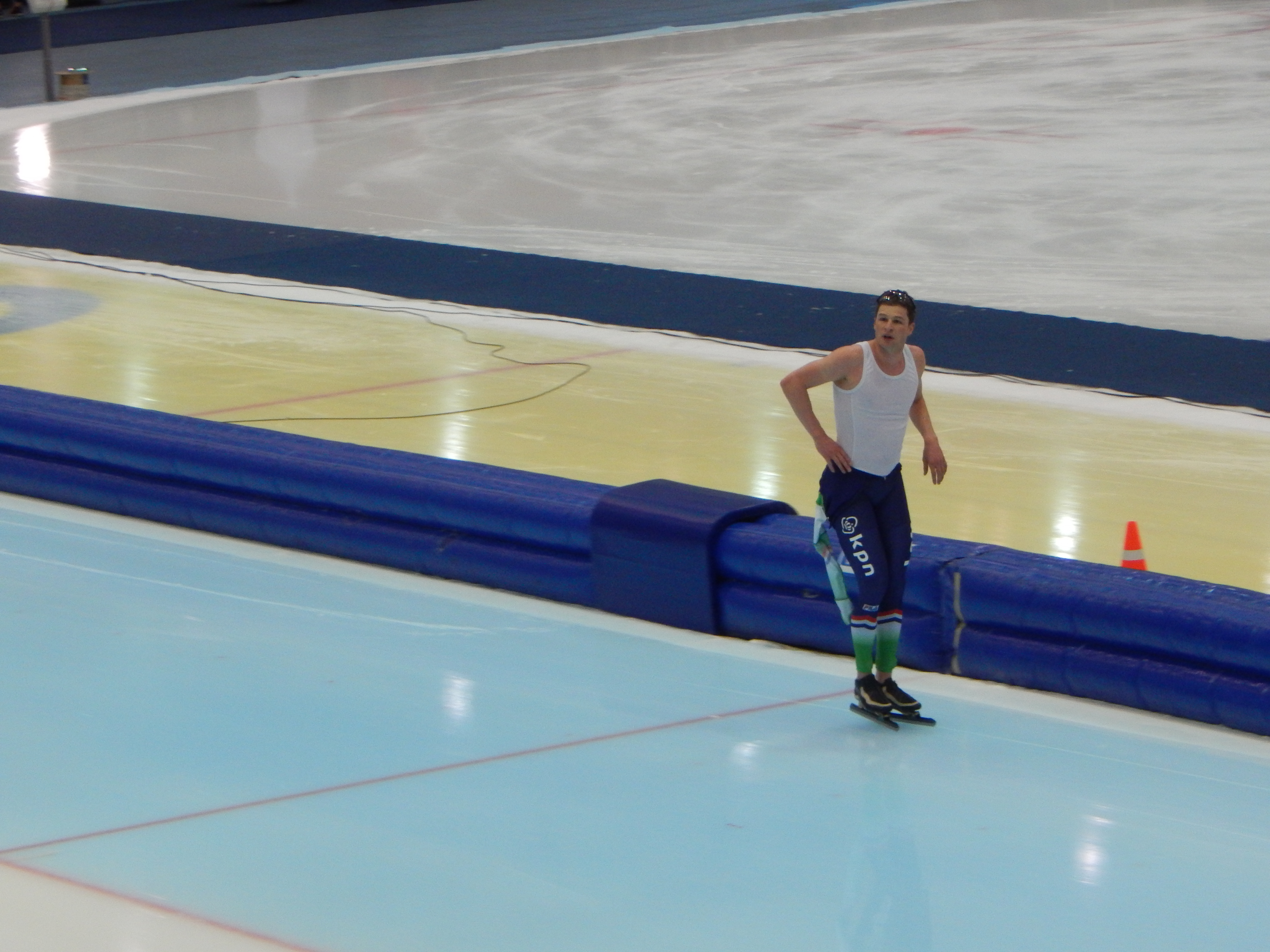
- Sven Kramer wins gold
- Venue: Kolomna Speed Skating Center, Kolomna
- Date: 11 February
- Competitors: 12 from 8 nations
- Winning time: 12:56.77

Medalists
gold medal	Sven Kramer	Netherlands
silver medal	Ted-Jan Bloemen	Canada
bronze medal	Erik Jan Kooiman	Netherlands

The Men's 10,000 metres race of the 2016 World Single Distances Speed Skating Championships was held on 11 February 2016.

== Results ==
The race was started at 16:45.

Rank	Pair	Lane	Name	Country	Time	Diff
1st place, gold medalist(s)	6	o	Sven Kramer	NED	12:56.77	
2nd place, silver medalist(s)	5	o	Ted-Jan Bloemen	CAN	12:59.69	+2.92
3rd place, bronze medalist(s)	4	o	Erik Jan Kooiman	NED	13:02.15	+5.38
4	5	i	Patrick Beckert	GER	13:09.42	+12.65
5	1	o	Jordan Belchos	CAN	13:10.99	+14.22
6	3	o	Moritz Geisreiter	GER	13:12.48	+15.71
7	2	o	Thomas-Henrik Søfteland	NOR	13:16.94	+20.17
8	1	i	Yevgeny Seryaev	RUS	13:18.04	+21.27
9	2	i	Ole Bjørnsmoen Næss	NOR	13:20.53	+23.76
10	3	i	Lee Seung-hoon	KOR	13:23.73	+26.96
11	6	i	Bart Swings	BEL	13:25.59	+28.82
12	4	i	Peter Michael	NZL	13:25.61	+28.84
