= 2027 World Single Distances Speed Skating Championships =

- Venue: Beijing National Speed Skating Oval, Beijing, China
- Dates: 25–28 February

The 2027 World Single Distances Speed Skating Championships will take place from 25 to 28 February 2027, at the Beijing National Speed Skating Oval in Beijing, China.

== Medal summary ==
=== Men's events ===
Event	Gold	Silver	Bronze
500 m			
1000 m			
1500 m			
5000 m			
10000 m			
Team sprint			
Team pursuit			
Mass start			

=== Women's events ===
Event	Gold	Silver	Bronze
500 m			
1000 m			
1500 m			
3000 m			
5000 m			
Team sprint			
Team pursuit			
Mass start			
