= 2020 World Single Distances Speed Skating Championships – Men's 5000 metres =

Men's 5000 metres at the 2020 World Single Distances Speed Skating Championships
- Venue: Utah Olympic Oval
- Location: Salt Lake City, United States
- Dates: February 13
- Competitors: 20 from 11 nations
- Winning time: 6:04.37

Medalists
gold medal	Ted-Jan Bloemen	Canada
silver medal	Sven Kramer	Netherlands
bronze medal	Graeme Fish	Canada

The Men's 5000 metres competition at the 2020 World Single Distances Speed Skating Championships was held on February 13, 2020.

== Results ==
The race was started at 13:40.

Rank	Pair	Lane	Name	Country	Time	Diff
1st place, gold medalist(s)	8	o	Ted-Jan Bloemen	Canada	6:04.37	
2nd place, silver medalist(s)	3	i	Sven Kramer	Netherlands	6:04.91	+0.54
3rd place, bronze medalist(s)	9	o	Graeme Fish	Canada	6:06.32	+1.95
4	5	o	Sverre Lunde Pedersen	Norway	6:11.80	+7.43
5	2	i	Jordan Belchos	Canada	6:12.07	+7.70
6	10	o	Patrick Beckert	Germany	6:12.12	+7.75
7	8	i	Davide Ghiotto	Italy	6:12.51	+8.14
8	5	i	Jorrit Bergsma	Netherlands	6:13.42	+9.05
9	1	o	Ruslan Zakharov	Russia	6:14.06	+9.69
10	4	o	Timothy Loubineaud	France	6:14.96	+10.59
11	1	i	Andrea Giovannini	Italy	6:15.44	+11.07
12	7	o	Denis Yuskov	Russia	6:15.50	+11.13
13	6	i	Ryosuke Tsuchiya	Japan	6:16.32	+11.95
14	2	o	Seitaro Ichinohe	Japan	6:18.40	+14.03
15	7	i	Bart Swings	Belgium	6:22.42	+18.05
16	10	i	Danila Semerikov	Russia	6:23.02	+18.65
17	3	o	Livio Wenger	Switzerland	6:23.32	+18.95
18	4	i	Håvard Bøkko	Norway	6:26.38	+22.01
19	6	o	Peter Michael	New Zealand	6:34.69	+30.32
	9	i	Patrick Roest	Netherlands	Disqualified	
