= New Zealand at the World Single Distance Championships =

- IOC code: NZL
- Medals Ranked =17th: Gold 0 Silver 1 Bronze 1 Total 2

This page is an overview of the results of New Zealand at the World Single Distance Championships.

== List of medalists ==
Medal	Championship	Name	Event
Silver	2017 Gangneung	Shane Dobbin; Reyon Kay; Peter Michael	Men's Team pursuit
Bronze	2017 Gangneung	Peter Michael	Men's 5000 m

== Medal table ==
=== Medals by discipline ===
Event	Gold	Silver	Bronze	Total	Rank
Men's 5000m	0	0	1	1	=9
Men's Team Pursuit	0	1	0	1	=7

=== Medals by championship ===
Event	Gold	Silver	Bronze	Total	Rank
2017 Gangneung	0	1	1	2	=9
