= Sweden at the World Single Distance Championships =

Sweden at the World Single Distances Speed Skating Championships
- IOC code: SWE
- Medals Ranked 19th: Gold 0 Silver 1 Bronze 0 Total 1

This page is an overview of the results of Sweden at the World Single Distances Speed Skating Championships.

== List of Medalists ==
Medal	Championship	Name	Event
Silver	2009 Vancouver	Joël Eriksson; Daniel Friberg; Johan Röjler	Men's Team pursuit

== Medal table ==
=== Medals by discipline ===
Event	Gold	Silver	Bronze	Total	Rank
Men's Team Pursuit	0	1	0	1	=7

=== Medals by championships ===
Event	Gold	Silver	Bronze	Total	Rank
2009 Vancouver	0	1	0	1	=8
