= 2012 KNSB Dutch Allround Championships =

- Venue: Thialf, Heerenveen
- Dates: 4–5 February 2012
- Competitors: 46

Medalist men
1st place, gold medalist(s)		Ted-Jan Bloemen	NED
2nd place, silver medalist(s)		Koen Verweij	NED
3rd place, bronze medalist(s)		Ben Jongejan	NED

Medalist women
1st place, gold medalist(s)		Marrit Leenstra	NED
2nd place, silver medalist(s)		Linda de Vries	NED
3rd place, bronze medalist(s)		Jorien Voorhuis	NED

The 2012 KNSB Dutch Allround Championships in speed skating were held at the Thialf ice stadium in Heerenveen, Netherlands from 4 to 5 February 2012. The tournament is part of the 2011/2012 speed skating season.

== Schedule ==
Schedule
Date	Distances
Saturday; 27 February 2012	Women's 500 meter Men's 500 meter Women's 3000 meter Men's 5000 meter
Sunday; 28 February 2012	Women's 1500 meter Men's 1500 meter Women's 5000 meter Men's 10000 meter

== Medalists ==
=== Allround ===
Distance	Gold		Silver		Bronze	
Men's Allround	Ted-Jan Bloemen	152.203	Koen Verweij	152.507	Ben Jongejan	153.266
Women's Allround	Marrit Leenstra	163.664	Linda de Vries	164.848	Jorien Voorhuis	165.684

=== Distance ===
Distance	Gold		Silver		Bronze	
Men's 500 m	Rhian Ket	36.24	Ben Jongejan	36.72	Lucas van Alphen	36.81
Men's 1500 m	Ben Jongejan	1:47.61	Rhian Ket	1:47.73	Koen Verweij	1:48.54
Men's 5000 m	Ted-Jan Bloemen	6:25.88	Koen Verweij	6:27.79	Ben Jongejan	6:31.41
Men's 10000 m	Ted-Jan Bloemen	13:23.90	Mark Ooijevaar	13:34.03	Koen Verweij	13:34.56
Women's 500 m	Marrit Leenstra	39.02	Lotte van Beek	40.02	Linda de Vries	40.14
Women's 1500 m	Marrit Leenstra	1:57.17	Linda de Vries	1:59.10	Annouk van der Weijden	1:59.32
Women's 3000 m	Linda de Vries	4:09.61	Marrit Leenstra	4:09.74	Pien Keulstra	4:11.06
Women's 5000 m	Linda de Vries	7:14.06	Jorien Voorhuis	7:15.96	Pien Keulstra	7:15.99

== Men's results ==
Place	Athlete	500m	5000m	1500m	10,000m	Points
1st place, gold medalist(s)	Ted-Jan Bloemen	37.13 (8)	6:25.88 (1)	1:48.87 (4)	13:23.90 (1)	152.203
2nd place, silver medalist(s)	Koen Verweij	36.82 (4)	6:27.79 (2)	1:48.54 (3)	13:34.55 (3)	152.506
3rd place, bronze medalist(s)	Ben Jongejan	36.72 (2)	6:31.41 (3)	1:47.61 (1)	13:50.70 (4)	153.266
4	Frank Hermans	37.06 (6)	6:31.78 (4)	1:49.01 (5)	13:51.20 (5)	154.134
5	Renz Rotteveel	37.08 (7)	6:32.32 (5)	1:50.02 (7)	13:52.01 (6)	154.585
6	Maurice Vriend	36.95 (5)	6:35.92 (7)	1:49.09 (6)	13:57.24 (7)	154.767
7	Jos de Vos	37.44 (11)	6:40.83 (8)	1:51.03 (10)	14:03.21 (8)	156.693
8	Thom van Beek	37.31 (9)	6:44.72 (10)	1:50.12 (8)	14:09.49 (9)	156.962
9	Lucas van Alphen	36.81 (3)	6:44.94 (12)	1:50.39 (9)	14:21.53 (11)	157.176
10	Mark Ooijevaar	39.75 (24)	6:33.87 (6)	1:52.17 (14)	13:34.03 (2)	157.228
11	Pim Cazemier	37.97 (15)	6:43.50 (9)	1:51.17 (11)	14:21.69 (12)	158.460
12	Bart van den Berg	37.76 (14)	6:47.69 (14)	1:51.63 (13)	14:19.55 (10)	158.716
NC13	Rhian Ket	36.24 (1)	6:44.86 (11)	1:47.73 (2)	-	112.636
NC14	Robbert de Rijk	37.55 (12)	6:50.06 (16)	1:52.20 (15)	-	115.956
NC15	Marco Bos	38.73 (20)	6:45.57 (13)	1:51.47 (12)	-	116.443
NC16	Ruurd Dijkstra	38.36 (17)	6:51.52 (17)	1:52.78 (16)	-	117.105
NC17	Bram van Schie	38.35 (16)	6:55.23 (18)	1:53.73 (20)	-	117.783
NC18	Stein Grendel	39.28 (22)	6:49.76 (15)	1:53.00 (19)	-	117.922
NC19	Dedjer Wymenga	37.36 (10)	7:10.66 (24)	1:52.95 (17)	-	118.076
NC20	Pepijn van der Vinne	37.61 (13)	7:10.45 (23)	1:52.99 (18)	-	118.318
NC21	Jeffrey van Norden	38.47 (18)	6:58.91 (20)	1:54.92 (22)	-	118.667
NC22	Ronald Bakker	38.67 (19)	7:00.19 (21)	1:54.01 (21)	-	118.692
NC23	Robert Post	39.26 (21)	6:57.70 (19)	1:55.82 (24)	-	119.636
NC24	Timon Nieuwenstein	39.45 (23)	7:04.75 (22)	1:55.53 (23)	-	120.435

Source men: Schaatsstatistieken.nl

== Women's results ==
Place	Athlete	500m	3000m	1500m	5000m	Points
1st place, gold medalist(s)	Marrit Leenstra	39.02 (1)	4:09.74 (2)	1:57.17 (1)	7:19.64 (6)	163.663
2nd place, silver medalist(s)	Linda de Vries	40.14 (3)	4:09.61 (1)	1:59.10 (2)	7:14.06 (1)	164.847
3rd place, bronze medalist(s)	Jorien Voorhuis	40.30 (5)	4:11.91 (5)	1:59.41 (4)	7:15.96 (2)	165.684
4	Annouk van der Weijden	40.19 (4)	4:16.73 (12)	1:59.32 (3)	7:16.76 (4)	166.427
5	Pien Keulstra	41.02 (11)	4:11.06 (3)	2:00.97 (9)	7:15.99 (3)	166.785
6	Yvonne Nauta	41.05 (13)	4:11.43 (4)	2:00.83 (6)	7:17.12 (5)	166.943
7	Marije Joling	40.54 (7)	4:12.49 (6)	2:00.89 (8)	7:22.23 (7)	167.140
8	Carlijn Achtereekte	40.40 (6)	4:15.66 (9)	2:01.27 (10)	7:25.90 (8)	168.023
9	Lotte van Beek	40.02 (2)	4:16.61 (11)	2:00.41 (5)	7:33.23 (10)	168.247
10	Antoinette de Jong	40.63 (8)	4:16.11 (10)	2:00.89 (7)	7:32.91 (9)	168.902
NC11	Lisette van der Geest	41.02 (12)	4:15.03 (8)	2:01.40 (11)	-	123.991
NC12	Janneke Ensing	41.13 (14)	4:14.73 (7)	2:01.49 (12)	-	124.081
NC13	Paulien van Deutekom	40.76 (9)	4:21.18 (14)	2:01.97 (13)	-	124.946
NC14	Miranda Dekker	40.80 (10)	4:21.10 (13)	2:03.60 (14)	-	125.516
NC15	Imke Vormeer	42.44 (19)	4:22.07 (15)	2:04.51 (15)	-	127.621
NC16	Wendy Looijenga	42.56 (20)	4:22.23 (16)	2:04.82 (16)	-	127.871
NC17	Julia Berentschot	41.34 (15)	4:31.21 (18)	2:05.81 (17)	-	128.477
NC18	Charlotte Bakker	41.78 (16)	4:30.99 (17)	2:06.14 (18)	-	128.991
NC19	Marleen de Kroon	42.35 (17)	4:32.18 (19)	2:09.09 (21)	-	130.743
NC20	Natasja Roest	42.43 (18)	4:36.36 (21)	2:07.69 (19)	-	131.053
NC21	Nicole Geelhoed	43.05 (21)	4:35.66 (20)	2:08.60 (20)	-	131.859
NC22	Lucia Kriger	43.46 (22)	4:38.47 (22)	2:11.36 (22)	-	133.657

Source women: Schaatsstatistieken.nl
