= Graeme Fish =

Canadian speed skater (born 1997)

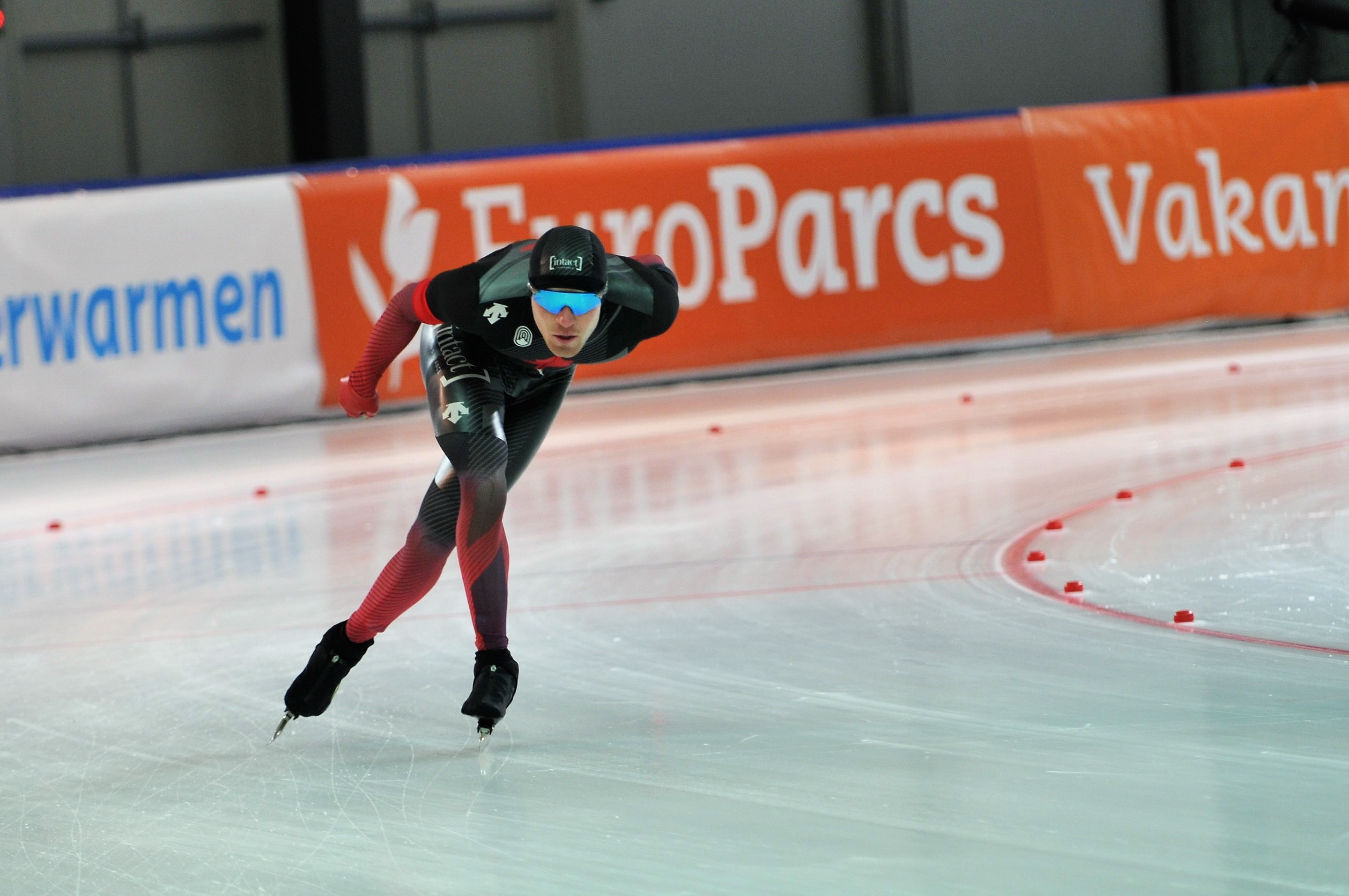

Personal information
- Born: August 23, 1997 (age 28) Moose Jaw, Saskatchewan, Canada

Sport
- Country: Canada
- Sport: Speed skating
- Event(s): 5000 m, 10,000 m
- Club: Moose Jaw Speed Skating Club
Medal record
World Single Distances Championships
| Gold medal – first place | 2020 Salt Lake City | 10000 m |
| Bronze medal – third place | 2020 Salt Lake City | 5000 m |
| Bronze medal – third place | 2024 Calgary | 10000 m |
Four Continents Championships
| Gold medal – first place | 2025 Hachinohe | 5000 m |
| Silver medal – second place | 2024 Salt Lake City | 5000 m |

Graeme Fish (born August 23, 1997) is a Canadian long track speed skater who specializes in the long-distance events. His best events include the 5000m and 10,000m

== Career ==
On February 13, 2020, he won a bronze medal at the 2020 World Single Distances Speed Skating Championships at the Utah Olympic Oval in Salt Lake City, United States.

The next day he won the gold medal in the 10,000 meters in a new world record of 12:33.86, becoming the first man from outside the Netherlands to win gold in this distance event in the 20 times it has been held at the worlds. He overtook the 2015 record set by his compatriot and mentor Ted-Jan Bloemen who finished second.

== Personal records ==
Personal records
| 500 m | 38.33 | 10 February 2017 | Olympic Oval, Calgary | |
| 1000 m | 1:13.73 | 27 November 2016 | Olympic Oval, Calgary | |
| 1500 m | 1:49.70 | 3 January 2020 | Olympic Oval, Calgary | |
| 3000 m | 3:44.44 | 28 December 2019 | Olympic Oval, Calgary | |
| 5000 m | 6:06.32 | 13 February 2020 | Utah Olympic Oval, Salt Lake City | |
| 10,000 m | 12:33.86 | 14 February 2020 | Utah Olympic Oval, Salt Lake City | List of world records in speed skating |

Records
| Preceded by (Canada) Ted-Jan Bloemen | Men's 10,000 m speed skating world record 14 February 2020 – 14 February 2021 | Succeeded by (Sweden) Nils van der Poel |
