= Belarus at the World Single Distance Championships =

- IOC code: BLR
- Medals Ranked =17th: Gold 0 Silver 1 Bronze 1 Total 2

This page is an overview of the results of Belarus at the World Single Distance Championships. Belarusian skater Anzhelika Kotyuga won two medals in the Women's 500m event.

== List of medalists ==
Medal	Championship	Name	Event
Bronze	2003 Berlin	Anzhelika Kotyuga	Women's 500 m
Silver	2004 Seoul	Anzhelika Kotyuga	Women's 500 m

== Medal table ==
=== Medals by discipline ===
Event	Gold	Silver	Bronze	Total	Rank
Women's 500m	0	1	1	2	=8

=== Medals by championship ===
Event	Gold	Silver	Bronze	Total	Rank
2003 Berlin	0	0	1	1	=7
2004 Seoul	0	1	0	1	=6
