= 2020 World Single Distances Speed Skating Championships – Men's 10,000 metres =

Men's 10,000 metres at the 2020 World Single Distances Speed Skating Championships
- Venue: Utah Olympic Oval
- Location: Salt Lake City, United States
- Dates: February 14
- Competitors: 12 from 9 nations
- Winning time: 12:33.86

Medalists
gold medal	Graeme Fish	Canada
silver medal	Ted-Jan Bloemen	Canada
bronze medal	Patrick Beckert	Germany

The Men's 10,000 metres competition at the 2020 World Single Distances Speed Skating Championships was held on February 14, 2020.

== Results ==
The race was started at 13:59.

Rank	Pair	Lane	Name	Country	Time	Diff
1st place, gold medalist(s)	5	o	Graeme Fish	Canada	12:33.86 WR	
2nd place, silver medalist(s)	6	i	Ted-Jan Bloemen	Canada	12:45.01	+11.15
3rd place, bronze medalist(s)	2	o	Patrick Beckert	Germany	12:47.93	+14.07
4	3	i	Jorrit Bergsma	Netherlands	12:48.45	+14.59
5	2	i	Ryosuke Tsuchiya	Japan	12:55.62	+21.76
6	5	i	Davide Ghiotto	Italy	12:58.30	+24.44
7	1	i	Timothy Loubineaud	France	12:58.97	+25.11
8	6	o	Patrick Roest	Netherlands	13:03.90	+30.04
9	3	o	Peter Michael	New Zealand	13:19.72	+45.86
	1	o	Dmitry Morozov	Kazakhstan	Did not finish	
	4	i	Nicola Tumolero	Italy	Did not finish	
	4	o	Aleksandr Rumyantsev	Russia	Did not finish	
