= Finland at the World Single Distance Championships =

- IOC code: FIN
- Medals Ranked 20th: Gold 0 Silver 0 Bronze 2 Total 2

This page is an overview of the results of Finland at the World Single Distance Championships.

== List of medalists ==
Medal	Championship	Name	Event
Bronze	2005 Inzell	Pekka Koskela	Men's 1000 m
Bronze	2012 Heerenveen	Pekka Koskela	Men's 500 m

== Medal table ==
=== Medals by discipline ===
Event	Gold	Silver	Bronze	Total	Rank
Men's 500m	0	0	1	1	=10
Men's 1000m	0	0	1	1	9

=== Medals by championships ===
Event	Gold	Silver	Bronze	Total	Rank
2005 Inzell	3	4	2	9	=9
2012 Heerenveen	5	5	4	14	=9
