= Nils van der Poel =

Swedish speed skater (born 1996)

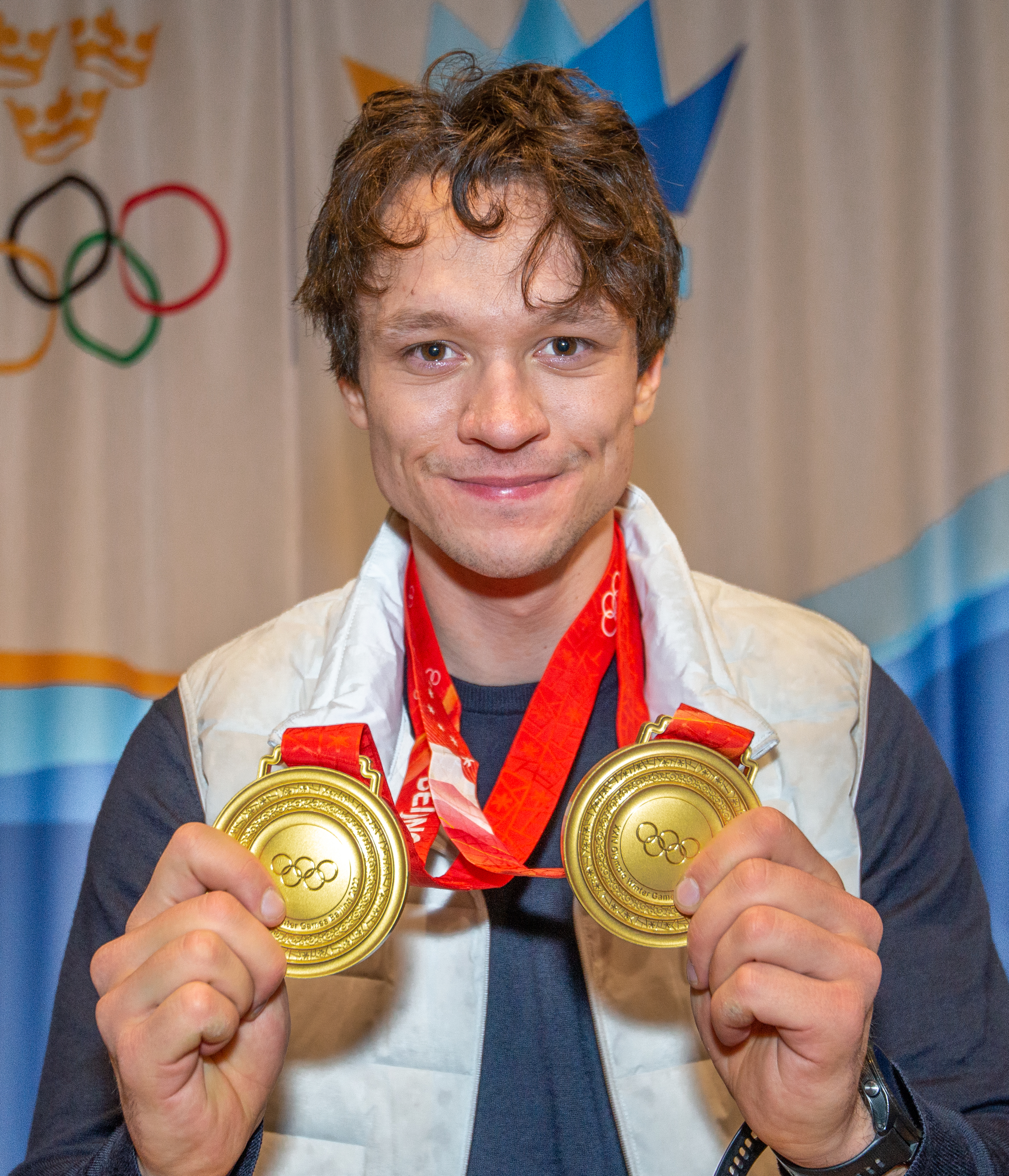
- Van der Poel in 2022

Personal information
- Full name: Nils Göran Svensson
- Nationality: Swedish
- Born: Nils Göran van der Poel; 25 April 1996 (age 30) Trollhättan, Sweden
- Height: 1.84 m (6 ft 0 in)
- Weight: 82 kg (181 lb)

Sport
- Country: Sweden
- Sport: Speed skating
- Event(s): 5 000 m, 10 000 m
- Club: SK Trollhättan
Medal record
Men's speed skating
Representing Sweden
Event	1st	2nd	3rd
Olympic Games	2	0	0
World Allround	1	0	0
World Single Distance	2	0	0
Total	5	0	0
Olympic Games
Gold medal – first place	2022 Beijing	5000 m
Gold medal – first place	2022 Beijing	10000 m
World Allround Championships
Gold medal – first place	2022 Hamar	Allround
World Single Distances Championships
Gold medal – first place	2021 Heerenveen	5000 m
Gold medal – first place	2021 Heerenveen	10000 m

Nils Göran Svensson (born Nils Göran van der Poel; Swedish pronunciation: [ˈnɪls fan dɛ(r) ˈpʰuːl]; 25 April 1996) is a retired Swedish speed skater who is the current Olympic record holder and 2022 Olympic champion in the 5,000 m event and the 10,000 m event.

== Career ==
Van der Poel won the 2014 World Junior Championships in Bjugn Municipality, Norway. He finished 14th in the men's 5000 metres at the 2018 Winter Olympics. On 2 June 2018, it was announced that he would take a break from speed skating. From 2018 to 2019, van der Poel completed the basic ranger course in the Army Ranger Battalion in Arvidsjaur, Sweden.

He became World champion at 5000 meters event at the World Championship on 11 February 2021, the first medal for Sweden in 38 years, and the first gold in 48 years. Three days later he also won the 10,000 meters event in a new world record.

At the 2022 Winter Olympics in Beijing, van der Poel won the gold medal in both the 5000 metres and the 10000 metres. In the process, he set both a new Olympic record of 6:08.84 in the 5000 metres event and gained Sweden its first speedskating gold medal in 34 years since the Tomas Gustafson gold at the same event at 1988 Winter Olympics in Calgary, as well as a new world record and Olympic record for the 10000 metres event. After the event, he donated one of his medals to Chinese political prisoner Gui Minhai to protest against human rights abuses in China.

At the World Allround Speedskating Championships 2022 in Hamar, van der Poel rallied to win the biggest title missing from his resume, knocking off Dutchman Patrick Roest (the reigning champion) in van der Poel's penultimate competition before retirement from elite racing. Van der Poel became the first Swede in 49 years to win the world men's allround – one of the most storied events in sports dating to 1893 that combines results from the 500 m, 1500 m, 5000 m, and 10,000 m over two days of racing.

Van der Poel is known for his high training volume, focusing on long, low-intensity aerobic training like cycling. After his gold medals at the 2022 Olympics, he published his training manifesto and workout journal, saying that he hoped that it would help others develop the sport. van der Poel wrote "I held myself to a high standard and I rewarded myself properly and often. When I failed, I forgave myself and tried my best not to fail again."

On 3 March 2022, he announced his retirement from elite ice speed skating following the 2021–22 season. His last competition was on 12 March 2022, where he won the 5000 metres event at the Speed Skating World Cup finale, and by that won the total World Cup Men's long distances 2021–22.

On 6 December 2022, he was awarded the Svenska Dagbladet Gold Medal. The same year Van der Poel won the Jerring Award.

== Personal records ==
Personal records
Speed skating
Event	Result	Date	Location	Notes
500-meter	37.33	5 March 2022	Vikingskipet, Hamar	
1000 meter	1:13.92	15 November 2014	Vikingskipet, Hamar	
1500 meter	1:47.18	5 December 2021	Utah Olympic Oval, Salt Lake City	
3000 meter	3:51.12	15 November 2014	Max Aicher Arena, Inzell	
5000 meter	6:01.56	3 December 2021	Utah Olympic Oval, Salt Lake City	Former world record.
10000 meter	12:30.74	11 February 2022	Beijing National Speed Skating Oval, Beijing	Former world record

Van der Poel's personal records for 500, 1500, 5000, and 10000 meters as of February 2022 are equivalent to an Adelskalender score of 147.289.

== Personal life ==
He is of Hungarian and Dutch descent. In November 2024, van der Poel changed his surname to Svensson, after his mother's maiden name.

Records
Preceded by (Canada) Ted-Jan Bloemen	Men's 5,000 m speed skating world record 3 December 2021 – present	Incumbent
Preceded by (Canada) Graeme Fish	Men's 10,000 m speed skating world record 14 February 2021 – present	Incumbent
