= Marita Johansson =

Swedish speed skater (born 1984)

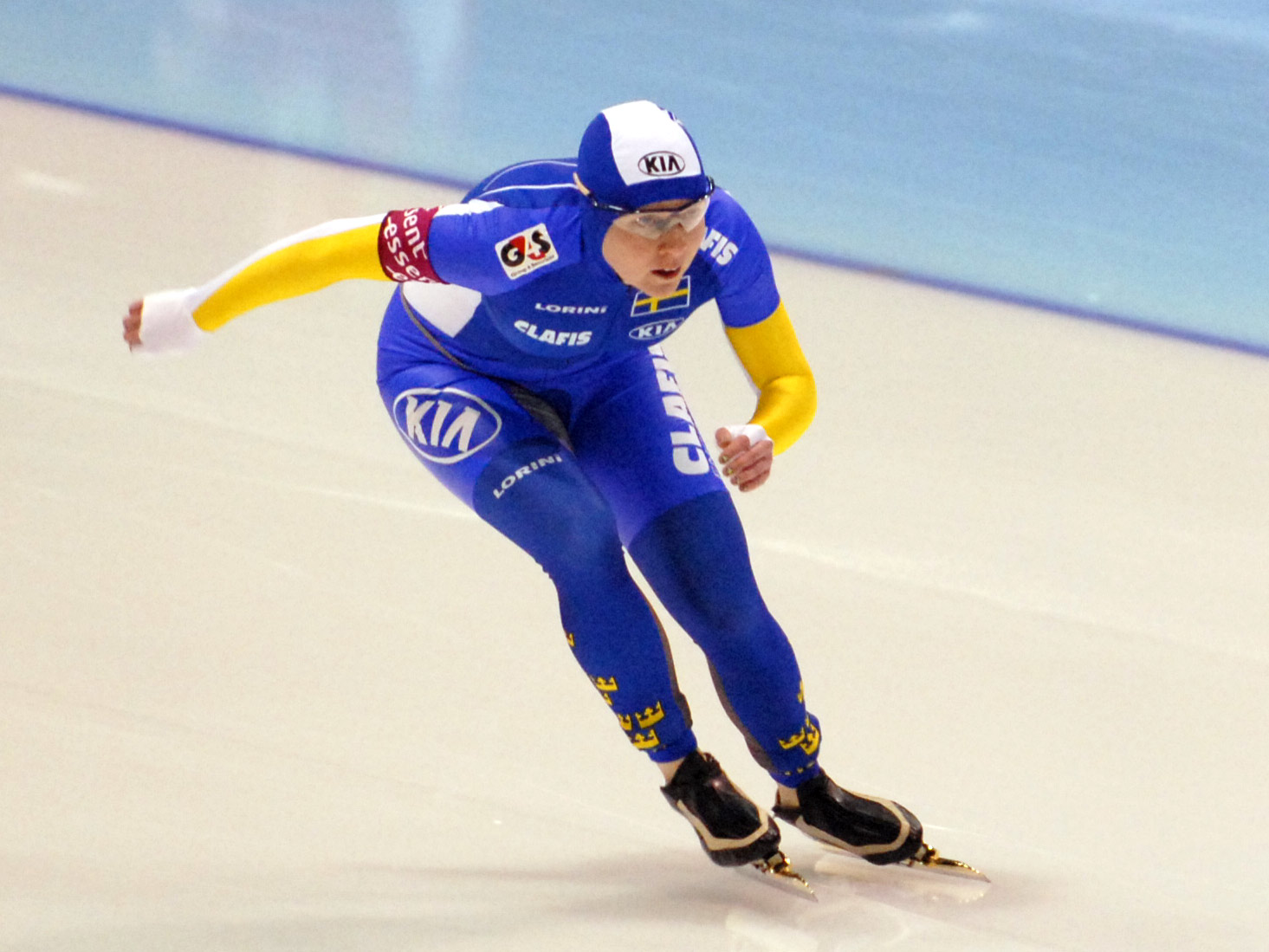
Marita Johansson during the European Championships 2009 in Heerenveen

Marita Johansson (born July 9, 1984 in Karlstad) is a Swedish long track speed skater who participates in international competitions.

== Personal records ==
Personal records
Women's Speed skating
Event	Result	Date	Location	Notes
500 m	42.49	2007-12-29	Gothenburg	
1,000 m	1:23.85	2005-11-05	Calgary	
1,500 m	2:02.83	2005-11-13	Calgary	
3,000 m	4:16.70	2005-11-18	Salt Lake City	
5,000 m	7:33.03	2005-02-20	Heerenveen	

=== Career highlights ===
European Allround Championships
2006 - Hamar, 24th
2007 - Collalbo, 23rd
2008 - Kolomna, 20th
World Junior Allround Championships
2003 - Kushiro, 28th
National Championships
2003 - Stockholm, (silver) 2nd at allround
2006 - Gothenburg, (bronze) 3rd at 3000 m
2006 - Gothenburg, (silver) 2nd at 1500 m
2006 - Gothenburg, (bronze) 3rd at 5000 m
2006 - Gothenburg, (silver) 2nd at allround
2007 - Stockholm, (gold) 1st at allround
2008 - Gothenburg, (gold) 1st at allround
Nordic Junior Games
2003 - Hamar, (silver) 2nd at 3000 m
European Youth-23 Games
2005 - Helsinki, (bronze) 3rd at 3000 m
