= 2021 World Single Distances Speed Skating Championships =

- Venue: Thialf, Heerenveen, Netherlands
- Dates: 11–14 February

The 2021 World Single Distances Speed Skating Championships were held between 11 and 14 February 2021, at Thialf in Heerenveen, Netherlands.

== Schedule ==
All times are local (UTC+1).

Date	Time	Events
11 February	14:50	3000 m ladies
11 February	16:01	5000 m men
12 February	15:10	Team pursuit ladies
12 February	15:33	Team pursuit men
12 February	16:13	500 m men
12 February	16:56	500 m ladies
13 February	15:13	1000 m ladies
13 February	16:02	1000 m men
13 February	16:55	Mass start final ladies
13 February	17:10	Mass start final men
14 February	12:35	1500 m ladies
14 February	13:32	1500 m men
14 February	14:28	5000 m ladies
14 February	15:35	10000 m men

== Russia doping ban ==
On 9 December 2019, the World Anti-Doping Agency (WADA) banned Russia from all international sport for a period of four years, after the Russian government was found to have tampered with laboratory data that it provided to WADA in January 2019 as a condition of the Russian Anti-Doping Agency being reinstated. As a result of the ban, WADA plans to allow individually cleared Russian athletes to take part in the 2021-2022 World Championships and 2022 Summer Olympics under a neutral banner, as instigated at the 2018 Winter Olympics, but they will not be permitted to compete in team sports. The title of the neutral banner has yet to be determined; WADA Compliance Review Committee head Jonathan Taylor stated that the IOC would not be able to use "Olympic Athletes from Russia" (OAR) as it did in 2018, emphasizing that neutral athletes cannot be portrayed as representing a specific country. Russia later filed an appeal to the Court of Arbitration for Sport (CAS) against the WADA decision. After reviewing the case on appeal, CAS ruled on 17 December 2020 to reduce the penalty that WADA had placed on Russia. Instead of banning Russia from sporting events, the ruling allowed Russia to participate at the Olympics and other international events, but for a period of two years, the team cannot use the Russian name, flag, or anthem and must present themselves as "Neutral Athlete" or "Neutral Team". The ruling does allow for team uniforms to display "Russia" on the uniform as well as the use of the Russian flag colors within the uniform's design, although the name should be up to equal predominance as the "Neutral Athlete/Team" designation.

== Medal summary ==
=== Medal table ===
* Host nation (Netherlands)

Rank	Nation	Gold	Silver	Bronze	Total
1	Netherlands*	7	6	5	18
2	United States	2	1	0	3
3	Sweden	2	0	0	2
4	Russian Skating Union	1	3	7	11
5	Canada	1	3	1	5
6	Norway	1	0	0	1
7	Czech Republic	0	1	0	1
8	Belgium	0	0	1	1
Totals (8 entries)		14	14	14	42

=== Men's events ===
Event	Gold		Silver		Bronze	
500 m	Laurent Dubreuil; Canada	34.398	Pavel Kulizhnikov; Russian Skating Union	34.540	Dai Dai Ntab; Netherlands	34.628
1000 m	Kai Verbij; Netherlands	1:08.052	Pavel Kulizhnikov; Russian Skating Union	1:08.313	Laurent Dubreuil; Canada	1:08.569
1500 m	Thomas Krol; Netherlands	1:43.752	Kjeld Nuis; Netherlands	1:44.110	Patrick Roest; Netherlands	1:45.493
5000 m	Nils van der Poel; Sweden	6:08.395; NR	Patrick Roest; Netherlands	6:10.050	Sergey Trofimov; Russian Skating Union	6:13.020
10000 m	Nils van der Poel; Sweden	12:32.952; WR	Jorrit Bergsma; Netherlands	12:45.868	Aleksandr Rumyantsev; Russian Skating Union	12:54.746; NR
Team pursuit	Netherlands; Marcel Bosker; Patrick Roest; Beau Snellink	3:41.429	Canada; Jordan Belchos; Ted-Jan Bloemen; Connor Howe	3:41.711	Russian Skating Union; Danila Semerikov; Sergey Trofimov; Ruslan Zakharov	3:42.662
Mass start	Joey Mantia; United States	60	Arjan Stroetinga; Netherlands	40	Bart Swings; Belgium	21

=== Women's events ===
Event	Gold		Silver		Bronze	
500 m	Angelina Golikova; Russian Skating Union	37.141	Femke Kok; Netherlands	37.281	Olga Fatkulina; Russian Skating Union	37.455
1000 m	Brittany Bowe; United States	1:14.128	Jutta Leerdam; Netherlands	1:14.672	Elizaveta Golubeva; Russian Skating Union	1:14.848
1500 m	Ragne Wiklund; Norway	1:54.613	Brittany Bowe; United States	1:55.034	Evgeniia Lalenkova; Russian Skating Union	1:55.099
3000 m	Antoinette de Jong; Netherlands	3:58.470	Martina Sáblíková; Czech Republic	3:58.579	Irene Schouten; Netherlands	3:59.757
5000 m	Irene Schouten; Netherlands	6:48.537	Natalya Voronina; Russian Skating Union	6:50.997	Carlijn Achtereekte; Netherlands	6:52.220
Team pursuit	Netherlands; Antoinette de Jong; Irene Schouten; Ireen Wüst	2:55.795	Canada; Ivanie Blondin; Valérie Maltais; Isabelle Weidemann	2:55.973	Russian Skating Union; Elizaveta Golubeva; Evgeniia Lalenkova; Natalya Voronina	2:59.358
Mass start	Marijke Groenewoud; Netherlands	60	Ivanie Blondin; Canada	42	Irene Schouten; Netherlands	20
