= List of Russian records in speed skating =

The following are the national records in speed skating in Russia maintained by the Russian Skating Union.

== Men ==
Event	Record	Athlete	Date	Meet	Place	Ref
500 meters	33.61 WR	Pavel Kulizhnikov	9 March 2019	World Cup	Salt Lake City, United States	
500 meters × 2	68.92	Pavel Kulizhnikov	15 February 2015	World Single Distance Championships	Heerenveen, Netherlands	
1000 meters	1:05.69	Pavel Kulizhnikov	15 February 2020	World Single Distances Championships	Salt Lake City, United States	
1500 meters	1:41.02	Denis Yuskov	9 December 2017	World Cup	Salt Lake City, United States	
3000 meters	3:37.52	Denis Yuskov	28 February 2015	Time Trials	Calgary, Canada	
5000 meters	6:08.64	Sergey Trofimov	3 December 2021	World Cup	Salt Lake City, United States	
10000 meters	12:51.33	Aleksandr Rumyantsev	11 February 2022	Olympic Games	Beijing, China	
Team sprint (3 laps)	1:18.25	Artyom Kuznetsov; Mikhail Kazelin; Aleksey Yesin	1 December 2017	World Cup	Calgary, Canada	
Team pursuit (8 laps)	3:35.90	Ruslan Zakharov; Daniil Aldoshkin; Yegor Yunin	5 December 2021	World Cup	Salt Lake City, United States	
Sprint combination	137.265 pts	Dmitry Lobkov	21–22 January 2012	World Cup	Salt Lake City, United States	
Small combination	151.270 pts	Yevgeny Lalenkov	21–23 November 2003	World Cup	Heerenveen, Netherlands	
Big combination	146.230 pts	Ivan Skobrev	12–13 February 2011	World Allround Championships	Calgary, Canada	

== Women ==
Event	Record	Athlete	Date	Meet	Place	Ref
500 meters	36.66	Angelina Golikova	11 December 2021	World Cup	Calgary, Canada	
500 meters × 2	75.06	Olga Fatkulina	11 February 2014	Olympic Games	Sochi, Russia	
1000 meters	1:12.33	Olga Fatkulina	15 February 2020	World Single Distances Championships	Salt Lake City, United States	
1500 meters	1:50.63	Yekaterina Shikhova	10 March 2019	World Cup	Salt Lake City, United States	
3000 meters	3:54.06	Natalya Voronina	9 March 2019	World Cup	Salt Lake City, United States	
5000 meters	6:39.02 WR	Natalya Voronina	15 February 2020	World Single Distances Championships	Salt Lake City, United States	
10000 meters	16:35.81	Lada Zadonskaya	19 January 2012	Moscow Championships	Moscow, Russia	
Team sprint (3 laps)	1:24.50	Angelina Golikova; Olga Fatkulina; Daria Kachanova	13 February 2020	World Single Distances Championships	Salt Lake City, United States	
Team pursuit (6 laps)	2:53.92	Elizaveta Kazelina; Evgeniia Lalenkova; Natalya Voronina	14 February 2020	World Single Distances Championships	Salt Lake City, United States	
Sprint combination	149.700 pts	Olga Fatkulina	26–27 January 2013	World Sprint Championships	Salt Lake City, United States	
Mini combination	156.359 pts	Varvara Barysheva	16–17 March 2001	Olympic Oval Final	Calgary, Canada	
Small combination	160.211 pts	Natalia Voronina	2–3 March 2019	World Allround Championships	Calgary, Canada	

== Mixed ==
Event	Record	Athlete	Date	Meet	Place	Ref
Relay	2:58.20	Nikita Baziuk; Alexandra Sayutina	22 November 2026	World Cup	Obihiro, Japan	
