= World Single Distances Speed Skating Championships =

Series of speed skating competitions

The World Single Distances Speed Skating Championships are a series of speed skating competitions organised by the International Skating Union.

== History ==
Since the late 19th century, speed skating championships were always decided by racing multiple distances – four different distances for the Allround Championships, and two different distances (which have to be skated twice) for Sprint Championships. However, the speed skating events at the Olympic Games were always individual distances, no medals are awarded for a combined event (the only exception being the 1924 Winter Olympics).

Towards the end of the 20th century, skaters started to specialize and it became rare that a skater was able to dominate both the short and the long distances. Perhaps the last skater able to do so was Eric Heiden, who won all five distances at the 1980 Winter Olympics. As a consequence of this specialization, the difference between the Olympic Games and the regular championships, and the popularity of both the Speed skating World Cup and Single Distance Championships held nationally in several countries, the International Skating Union decided to organise the World Single Distance Championships.

Starting in 1996, this originally was an annual event, but in 1998 it became clear that having World Single Distance Championships and the Single Distance Championships as held at the Winter Olympics during the same year was too much, so since 1999, the World Single Distance Championships are no longer held in (Winter) Olympic years.

== Distances ==
The skaters compete in the following distances:

Men (List of medal winners)	Women (List of medal winners)	Notes
500 m	500 m	
1,000 m	1,000 m	
1,500 m	1,500 m	
5,000 m	3,000 m	
10,000 m	5,000 m	
Team pursuit	Team pursuit	(since 2005)
Mass start	Mass start	(since 2015)
Team sprint	Team sprint	(2019–2020, since 2023)

== Summary ==
ISU Single Distances Championships
Number	Year	City	Country	Events
1	1996	Hamar	Norway	10
2	1997	Warsaw	Poland	10
3	1998	Calgary	Canada	10
4	1999	Heerenveen	Netherlands	10
5	2000	Nagano	Japan	10
6	2001	Salt Lake City	United States	10
7	2003	Berlin	Germany	10
8	2004	Seoul	South Korea	10
9	2005	Inzell	Germany	12
10	2007	Salt Lake City	United States	12
11	2008	Nagano	Japan	12
12	2009	Richmond	Canada	12
13	2011	Inzell	Germany	12
14	2012	Heerenveen	Netherlands	12
15	2013	Sochi	Russia	12
16	2015	Heerenveen	Netherlands	14
17	2016	Kolomna	Russia	14
18	2017	Gangneung	South Korea	14
19	2019	Inzell	Germany	16
20	2020	Salt Lake City	United States	16
21	2021	Heerenveen	Netherlands	14
22	2023	Heerenveen	Netherlands	16
23	2024	Calgary	Canada	16
24	2025	Hamar	Norway	16
25	2027	Beijing	China	16

== Medal summary ==
The medal table by nations is the total number of the 16 distances (men and women) at all of the 23 championships (1996–2025). The individual tables are about the eight distances by gender.

=== Nations ===
All medals, click on the nation to go to the list of medallists.

Updated after the 2025 World Championships.

Rank	Nation	Gold	Silver	Bronze	Total
1	Netherlands	120	104	79	303
2	Germany	36	33	27	96
3	Canada	31	42	43	116
4	United States	29	18	30	77
5	Czech Republic	16	7	6	29
6	Japan	15	19	24	58
7	Russia	13	16	28	57
8	Norway	12	17	14	43
9	South Korea	10	13	8	31
10	Italy	6	9	4	19
11	China	4	12	7	23
12	Belgium	2	2	4	8
13	Austria	2	2	2	6
14	Sweden	2	1	0	3
15	Russian Skating Union	1	3	7	11
16	Kazakhstan	1	0	1	2
17	Poland	0	2	7	9
18	France	0	1	2	3
19	Belarus	0	1	1	2
19	New Zealand	0	1	1	2
21	Finland	0	0	2	2
22	Great Britain	0	0	1	1
22	Switzerland	0	0	1	1
Totals (23 entries)		**300**	**303**	**299**	**902**

=== Men ===
Top 10, including team pursuit and team sprint. Boldface denotes active skaters and highest medal count among all skaters (including those who are not included in these tables) per type.

Rank	Skater	Country	From	To	Gold	Silver	Bronze	Total
1	Sven Kramer	Netherlands	2007	2020	**21**	3	2	**26**
2	Shani Davis	United States	2004	2015	8	4	3	15
3	Bob de Jong	Netherlands	1997	2013	7	**8**	5	20
4	Gianni Romme	Netherlands	1996	2004	7	2	3	12
5	Erben Wennemars	Netherlands	1999	2008	6	2	3	11
6	**Jordan Stolz**	United States	2023	2025	6	2	1	9
7	**Jorrit Bergsma**	Netherlands	2012	2023	5	**8**	–	13
8	Carl Verheijen	Netherlands	2001	2009	5	5	3	13
9	Hiroyasu Shimizu	Japan	1996	2005	5	3	2	10
10	**Pavel Kulizhnikov**	Russia; Russian Skating Union	2015	2021	5	3	1	9

=== Women ===
Top 10, including team pursuit and team sprint. Boldface denotes active skaters and highest medal count among all skaters (including those who are not included in these tables) per type.

Rank	Skater	Country	From	To	Gold	Silver	Bronze	Total
1	Martina Sáblíková	Czech Republic	2007	2025	**16**	7	4	27
2	Ireen Wüst	Netherlands	2007	2021	15	**15**	1	**31**
3	Anni Friesinger	Germany	1997	2009	12	9	1	22
4	Gunda Niemann-Stirnemann	Germany	1996	2001	11	3	–	14
5	Irene Schouten	Netherlands	2015	2024	8	2	5	15
6	Christine Nesbitt	Canada	2007	2013	7	2	3	12
7	**Antoinette Rijpma-de Jong**	Netherlands	2016	2025	6	5	2	13
8	Miho Takagi	Japan	2015	2025	6	4	6	16
9	Claudia Pechstein	Germany	1996	2017	5	13	**12**	30
10	**Ivanie Blondin**	Canada	2015	2025	5	9	3	17
